= Michigan–Minnesota men's ice hockey rivalry =

College sports rivalry

- Michigan Wolverines Minnesota Golden Gophers
- Sport: Ice hockey
- First meeting: January 22, 1923; Minnesota 2, Michigan 0
- Latest meeting: February 27, 2026; Michigan 4, Minnesota 2
- Next meeting: January 8, 2027
- Stadiums: Yost Ice Arena; 3M Arena at Mariucci
- Trophy: Mariucci-Renfrew Trophy

Statistics
- Total meetings: 320
- All-time series: Minnesota leads, 157–143–20 (.522)
- Largest victory: Minnesota, 15–2 (February 3, 1945)
- Longest win streak: Michigan, 16 (1949–1952)
- Current win streak: Michigan, 1 (2026–present)
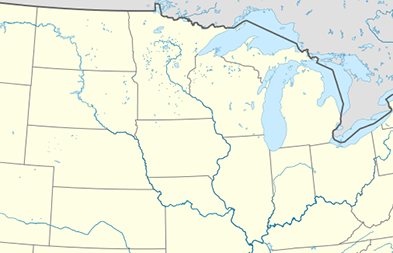

The Michigan–Minnesota men's ice hockey rivalry is a college ice hockey rivalry between the Michigan Wolverines men's ice hockey and Minnesota Golden Gophers men's ice hockey programs. The first meeting between the two occurred on January 22, 1923 and is an extension of the long-standing conference rivalry between the two.

== History ==
Shortly after the end of World War I, college ice hockey began to expand into the Midwest. both Michigan and Minnesota began fielding unofficial team in the early-1920s with the latter officially recognizing the sport in 1921. The following year Michigan began sponsoring ice hockey as well and the two were the only three Big Ten teams to support such programs (the other being Wisconsin). Minnesota was the dominant western team during the 20s and 30s, routinely winning the championship. however, Michigan served as the team's main foil during this period, winning three titles themselves.

Both teams continued to operate through the duration of World War II but it was Michigan who came to the fore afterwards. Led by former star player Vic Heyliger, the Wolverines won six National Championships in nine years, defeating Minnesota in the 1953 NCAA tournament. During this period, both teams were founding members of the MCHL, however, a disagreement over recruitment caused the conference to collapse in 1958. In the aftermath, Michigan, Minnesota and Michigan State formed an informal Big Ten conference but that was rendered superfluous when the previous MCHL members all reconvened and formed the WCHA in 1959.

Michigan flagged in the late 60s and in the wake of their deprivation, Minnesota surged to the top. The Gophers won three titles in the 70s as the rivalry cooled. In 1981, Michigan was one of four teams to leave the WCHA, ending the conference rivalry between the two. Minnesota remained one of the top teams in college hockey for the next 20 years while Michigan slowly rebuilt the program. By the early 90s both were routinely making NCAA tournament appearances and eventually met for one of the most iconic games in NCAA history. The two faced off in the 1996 quarterfinals and Mike Legg scored the infamous Michigan goal. The Wolverines won the game and went on to win their 8th national championship that year. The rekindling of the rivalry also coincided with the founding of the College Hockey Showcase, a series between the four Big Ten teams that had previously been rivals in the WCHA. During the 17 years that it was held, Michigan and Minnesota dominated the series.

The two would meet again in the 1997 tournament but it was not until 2002 that Minnesota was finally able to defeat Michigan in the tournament. The Gophers beat Michigan in the Frozen Four before going on to win their fourth national title. Minnesota then repeated the performance the following season for their fifth championship.

In 2011, after the return of Penn State's ice hockey program, the Big Ten announced that they would finally be sponsoring ice hockey as a conference sport. Michigan and Minnesota once more became conference rivals and soon rose to the top of the league. In ten seasons, the two have met in the conference championship game four times with Michigan winning three of those meetings.

== Game results ==
Full game results for the rivalry, with rankings beginning in the 1995–96 season.

Michigan victories	Minnesota victories	Tie games

No.	Date	Location	Winner	Score
1	January 22, 1923	Hippodrome; Saint Paul, MN	Minnesota	2–0
2	January 23, 1923	Hippodrome; Saint Paul, MN	Minnesota	3–0
3	February 16, 1923	Weinberg Coliseum; Ann Arbor, MI	Minnesota	6–3
4	February 17, 1923	Weinberg Coliseum; Ann Arbor, MI	Michigan	3–2
5	February 18, 1924	Hippodrome; Saint Paul, MN	Minnesota	2–1
6	February 19, 1924	Hippodrome; Saint Paul, MN	Minnesota	2–0
7	February 22, 1924	Weinberg Coliseum; Ann Arbor, MI	Minnesota	7–1
8	February 23, 1924	Weinberg Coliseum; Ann Arbor, MI	Michigan	3–2
9	March 2, 1925	Weinberg Coliseum; Ann Arbor, MI	Tie	1–1
10	March 3, 1925	Weinberg Coliseum; Ann Arbor, MI	Michigan	1–0
11	February 19, 1926	Weinberg Coliseum; Ann Arbor, MI	Minnesota	6–0
12	February 20, 1926	Weinberg Coliseum; Ann Arbor, MI	Tie	1–1 ^{OT}
13	March 1, 1926	Minneapolis Arena; Minneapolis, MN	Minnesota	4–2^{2OT}
14	March 2, 1926	Minneapolis Arena; Minneapolis, MN	Minnesota	2–1
15	February 22, 1927	Minneapolis Arena; Minneapolis, MN	Minnesota	3–2
16	February 23, 1927	Minneapolis Arena; Minneapolis, MN	Minnesota	1–0
17	March 11, 1927	Windsor Arena; Windsor, ON	Michigan	1–0^{OT}
18	March 12, 1927	Windsor Arena; Windsor, ON	Michigan	2–1^{OT}
19	January 17, 1928	Olympia Stadium; Detroit, MI	Minnesota	3–0
20	January 18, 1928	Olympia Stadium; Detroit, MI	Minnesota	4–1
21	February 13, 1928	Minneapolis Arena; Minneapolis, MN	Minnesota	4–1
22	February 14, 1928	Minneapolis Arena; Minneapolis, MN	Minnesota	4–0
23	January 18, 1929	Weinberg Coliseum; Ann Arbor, MI	Minnesota	4–0
24	January 19, 1929	Weinberg Coliseum; Ann Arbor, MI	Minnesota	6–0
25	February 21, 1929	Minneapolis Arena; Minneapolis, MN	Minnesota	5–1
26	February 23, 1929	Minneapolis Arena; Minneapolis, MN	Minnesota	2–0
27	January 20, 1930	Minneapolis Arena; Minneapolis, MN	Michigan	3–0
28	January 21, 1930	Minneapolis Arena; Minneapolis, MN	Minnesota	1–0
29	February 21, 1930	Weinberg Coliseum; Ann Arbor, MI	Tie	1–1
30	February 22, 1930	Weinberg Coliseum; Ann Arbor, MI	Michigan	2–1
31	January 23, 1931	Minneapolis Arena; Minneapolis, MN	Michigan	2–1
32	January 24, 1931	Minneapolis Arena; Minneapolis, MN	Michigan	1–0
33	February 27, 1931	Weinberg Coliseum; Ann Arbor, MI	Michigan	3–1
34	February 28, 1931	Weinberg Coliseum; Ann Arbor, MI	Michigan	2–0
35	January 21, 1932	Minneapolis Arena; Minneapolis, MN	Minnesota	3–0
36	January 22, 1932	Minneapolis Arena; Minneapolis, MN	Minnesota	1–0
37	March 4, 1932	Weinberg Coliseum; Ann Arbor, MI	Michigan	3–1
38	March 5, 1932	Weinberg Coliseum; Ann Arbor, MI	Michigan	2–0
39	January 20, 1933	Minneapolis Arena; Minneapolis, MN	Minnesota	2–1^{OT}
40	January 21, 1933	Minneapolis Arena; Minneapolis, MN	Minnesota	3–1
41	February 24, 1933	Weinberg Coliseum; Ann Arbor, MI	Minnesota	5–2
42	February 25, 1933	Weinberg Coliseum; Ann Arbor, MI	Michigan	3–1
43	January 18, 1934	Minneapolis Arena; Minneapolis, MN	Minnesota	5–2
44	January 19, 1934	Minneapolis Arena; Minneapolis, MN	Minnesota	1–0
45	February 23, 1934	Weinberg Coliseum; Ann Arbor, MI	Minnesota	3–1
46	February 24, 1934	Weinberg Coliseum; Ann Arbor, MI	Minnesota	2–1
47	January 18, 1935	Minneapolis Arena; Minneapolis, MN	Tie	2–2^{OT}
48	January 19, 1935	Minneapolis Arena; Minneapolis, MN	Michigan	4–3
49	February 22, 1935	Weinberg Coliseum; Ann Arbor, MI	Tie	1–1
50	February 23, 1935	Weinberg Coliseum; Ann Arbor, MI	Michigan	3–1
51	January 16, 1936	Minneapolis Arena; Minneapolis, MN	Minnesota	7–1
52	January 17, 1936	Minneapolis Arena; Minneapolis, MN	Minnesota	1–0
53	February 21, 1936	Weinberg Coliseum; Ann Arbor, MI	Michigan	2–1^{OT}
54	February 22, 1936	Weinberg Coliseum; Ann Arbor, MI	Minnesota	5–1

No.	Date	Location	Winner	Score
55	January 15, 1937	Weinberg Coliseum; Ann Arbor, MI	Minnesota	3–0
56	January 16, 1937	Weinberg Coliseum; Ann Arbor, MI	Michigan	8–1
57	February 24, 1937	Minneapolis Arena; Minneapolis, MN	Minnesota	3–1
58	February 25, 1937	Minneapolis Arena; Minneapolis, MN	Michigan	3–2
59	January 12, 1938	Minneapolis Arena; Minneapolis, MN	Minnesota	2–1
60	January 14, 1938	Minneapolis Arena; Minneapolis, MN	Michigan	2–1
61	February 24, 1938	Weinberg Coliseum; Ann Arbor, MI	Minnesota	4–3
62	February 26, 1938	Weinberg Coliseum; Ann Arbor, MI	Michigan	5–3
63	January 19, 1939	Weinberg Coliseum; Ann Arbor, MI	Minnesota	6–0
64	January 21, 1939	Weinberg Coliseum; Ann Arbor, MI	Minnesota	4–0
65	February 23, 1939	Minneapolis Arena; Minneapolis, MN	Minnesota	7–0
66	February 25, 1939	Minneapolis Arena; Minneapolis, MN	Minnesota	8–3
67	January 12, 1940	Minneapolis Arena; Minneapolis, MN	Minnesota	9–2
68	January 14, 1940	Minneapolis Arena; Minneapolis, MN	Minnesota	5–3
69	February 24, 1940	Weinberg Coliseum; Ann Arbor, MI	Minnesota	7–0
70	February 26, 1940	Weinberg Coliseum; Ann Arbor, MI	Minnesota	5–0
71	January 16, 1941	Minneapolis Arena; Minneapolis, MN	Minnesota	4–0
72	January 18, 1941	Minneapolis Arena; Minneapolis, MN	Minnesota	7–2
73	February 27, 1941	Weinberg Coliseum; Ann Arbor, MI	Minnesota	8–0
74	March 1, 1941	Weinberg Coliseum; Ann Arbor, MI	Minnesota	2–1
75	January 22, 1942	Minneapolis Arena; Minneapolis, MN	Michigan	3–2
76	January 24, 1942	Minneapolis Arena; Minneapolis, MN	Minnesota	6–0
77	February 26, 1942	Weinberg Coliseum; Ann Arbor, MI	Minnesota	4–0
78	February 28, 1942	Weinberg Coliseum; Ann Arbor, MI	Minnesota	5–1
79	January 14, 1943	Minneapolis Arena; Minneapolis, MN	Minnesota	3–0
80	January 16, 1943	Minneapolis Arena; Minneapolis, MN	Minnesota	4–0
81	February 18, 1943	Weinberg Coliseum; Ann Arbor, MI	Tie	1–1^{OT}
82	February 20, 1943	Weinberg Coliseum; Ann Arbor, MI	Minnesota	6–2
83	January 13, 1945	Minneapolis Arena; Minneapolis, MN	Minnesota	10–0
84	February 3, 1945	Weinberg Coliseum; Ann Arbor, MI	Minnesota	15–2
85	January 18, 1946	Weinberg Coliseum; Ann Arbor, MI	Michigan	5–2
86	January 19, 1946	Weinberg Coliseum; Ann Arbor, MI	Michigan	8–4
87	February 1, 1946	Minneapolis Arena; Minneapolis, MN	Tie	3–3^{OT}
88	February 2, 1946	Minneapolis Arena; Minneapolis, MN	Minnesota	5–2
89	January 17, 1947	Weinberg Coliseum; Ann Arbor, MI	Tie	4–4^{OT}
90	January 18, 1947	Weinberg Coliseum; Ann Arbor, MI	Michigan	5–4
91	February 14, 1947	Minneapolis Arena; Minneapolis, MN	Michigan	4–2
92	February 15, 1947	Minneapolis Arena; Minneapolis, MN	Minnesota	3–2
93	January 16, 1948	Minneapolis Arena; Minneapolis, MN	Michigan	3–2
94	January 17, 1948	Minneapolis Arena; Minneapolis, MN	Michigan	5–1
95	February 13, 1948	Weinberg Coliseum; Ann Arbor, MI	Michigan	6–2
96	February 14, 1948	Weinberg Coliseum; Ann Arbor, MI	Minnesota	5–4^{OT}
97	February 18, 1949	Minneapolis Arena; Minneapolis, MN	Michigan	4–1
98	February 19, 1949	Mayo Civic Center; Rochester, MN	Michigan	6–3
99	February 25, 1949	Weinberg Coliseum; Ann Arbor, MI	Michigan	10–4
100	February 26, 1949	Weinberg Coliseum; Ann Arbor, MI	Michigan	4–1
101	February 3, 1950	Weinberg Coliseum; Ann Arbor, MI	Michigan	2–1
102	February 4, 1950	Weinberg Coliseum; Ann Arbor, MI	Michigan	6–2
103	February 24, 1950	Williams Arena; Minneapolis, MN	Michigan	7–3
104	February 25, 1950	Williams Arena; Minneapolis, MN	Michigan	6–2
105	January 5, 1951	Williams Arena; Minneapolis, MN	Michigan	5–4^{OT}
106	January 6, 1951	Williams Arena; Minneapolis, MN	Michigan	6–4
107	February 19, 1951	Weinberg Coliseum; Ann Arbor, MI	Michigan	12–2
108	February 20, 1951	Weinberg Coliseum; Ann Arbor, MI	Michigan	8–0

No.	Date	Location	Winner	Score
109	January 11, 1952	Weinberg Coliseum; Ann Arbor, MI	Michigan	5–4
110	January 12, 1952	Weinberg Coliseum; Ann Arbor, MI	Michigan	6–1
111	January 18, 1952	Williams Arena; Minneapolis, MN	Michigan	7–2
112	January 19, 1952	Williams Arena; Minneapolis, MN	Michigan	5–0
113	January 16, 1953	Weinberg Coliseum; Ann Arbor, MI	Minnesota	4–3
114	January 17, 1953	Weinberg Coliseum; Ann Arbor, MI	Michigan	5–4
115	February 13, 1953	Williams Arena; Minneapolis, MN	Minnesota	5–2
116	February 14, 1953	Williams Arena; Minneapolis, MN	Minnesota	4–0
117	March 14, 1953	Broadmoor Ice Palace; Colorado Springs, CO	Michigan	7–3
118	January 15, 1954	Williams Arena; Minneapolis, MN	Minnesota	5–4
119	January 16, 1954	Williams Arena; Minneapolis, MN	Michigan	4–3
120	February 26, 1954	Weinberg Coliseum; Ann Arbor, MI	Michigan	6–3
121	February 27, 1954	Weinberg Coliseum; Ann Arbor, MI	Michigan	5–2
122	January 14, 1955	Weinberg Coliseum; Ann Arbor, MI	Minnesota	10–4
123	January 15, 1955	Weinberg Coliseum; Ann Arbor, MI	Michigan	5–3
124	February 18, 1955	Williams Arena; Minneapolis, MN	Michigan	5–2
125	February 19, 1955	Williams Arena; Minneapolis, MN	Michigan	3–1
126	January 13, 1956	Weinberg Coliseum; Ann Arbor, MI	Michigan	2–0
127	January 14, 1956	Weinberg Coliseum; Ann Arbor, MI	Michigan	2–1
128	February 18, 1956	Williams Arena; Minneapolis, MN	Michigan	5–3
129	February 19, 1956	Williams Arena; Minneapolis, MN	Michigan	6–2
130	February 8, 1957	Williams Arena; Minneapolis, MN	Minnesota	7–3
131	February 9, 1957	Williams Arena; Minneapolis, MN	Michigan	4–3
132	February 15, 1957	Weinberg Coliseum; Ann Arbor, MI	Michigan	8–1
133	February 16, 1957	Weinberg Coliseum; Ann Arbor, MI	Michigan	4–1
134	February 7, 1958	Williams Arena; Minneapolis, MN	Minnesota	4–2
135	February 8, 1958	Williams Arena; Minneapolis, MN	Michigan	4–2
136	February 21, 1958	Weinberg Coliseum; Ann Arbor, MI	Minnesota	10–5
137	February 22, 1958	Weinberg Coliseum; Ann Arbor, MI	Michigan	3–2
138	February 13, 1959	Weinberg Coliseum; Ann Arbor, MI	Minnesota	6–1
139	February 14, 1959	Weinberg Coliseum; Ann Arbor, MI	Minnesota	7–3
140	February 27, 1959	Williams Arena; Minneapolis, MN	Minnesota	6–2
141	February 28, 1959	Williams Arena; Minneapolis, MN	Michigan	6–3
142	February 5, 1960	Williams Arena; Minneapolis, MN	Minnesota	6–3
143	February 6, 1960	Williams Arena; Minneapolis, MN	Michigan	4–2
144	February 26, 1960	Weinberg Coliseum; Ann Arbor, MI	Michigan	3–2
145	February 27, 1960	Weinberg Coliseum; Ann Arbor, MI	Minnesota	4–3^{OT}
146	January 13, 1961	Williams Arena; Minneapolis, MN	Minnesota	4–2
147	January 14, 1961	Williams Arena; Minneapolis, MN	Michigan	4–2
148	January 20, 1961	Weinberg Coliseum; Ann Arbor, MI	Michigan	4–3
149	January 21, 1961	Weinberg Coliseum; Ann Arbor, MI	Michigan	9–3
150	March 10, 1961	Williams Arena; Minneapolis, MN	Minnesota	3–1
151	March 11, 1961	Williams Arena; Minneapolis, MN	Tie	3–3
152	January 4, 1963	Williams Arena; Minneapolis, MN	Minnesota	6–4
153	January 5, 1963	Williams Arena; Minneapolis, MN	Tie	3–3^{OT}
154	February 8, 1963	Weinberg Coliseum; Ann Arbor, MI	Minnesota	6–3
155	February 9, 1963	Weinberg Coliseum; Ann Arbor, MI	Tie	5–5^{OT}
156	January 10, 1964	Williams Arena; Minneapolis, MN	Michigan	5–1
157	January 11, 1964	Williams Arena; Minneapolis, MN	Minnesota	6–5
158	February 21, 1964	Weinberg Coliseum; Ann Arbor, MI	Michigan	6–3
159	February 22, 1964	Weinberg Coliseum; Ann Arbor, MI	Michigan	8–2
160	December 4, 1964	Weinberg Coliseum; Ann Arbor, MI	Michigan	7–6
161	December 5, 1964	Weinberg Coliseum; Ann Arbor, MI	Minnesota	10–3
162	January 19, 1965	Williams Arena; Minneapolis, MN	Minnesota	5–4

No.	Date	Location	Winner	Score
163	January 20, 1965	Williams Arena; Minneapolis, MN	Minnesota	5–3
164	January 7, 1966	Williams Arena; Minneapolis, MN	Michigan	5–4
165	January 8, 1966	Williams Arena; Minneapolis, MN	Michigan	3–1
166	February 11, 1966	Weinberg Coliseum; Ann Arbor, MI	Minnesota	5–4
167	February 12, 1966	Weinberg Coliseum; Ann Arbor, MI	Minnesota	3–2
168	January 13, 1967	Weinberg Coliseum; Ann Arbor, MI	Michigan	10–5
169	January 14, 1967	Weinberg Coliseum; Ann Arbor, MI	Michigan	5–4
170	March 3, 1967	Williams Arena; Minneapolis, MN	Tie	4–4^{OT}
171	March 4, 1967	Williams Arena; Minneapolis, MN	Minnesota	10–8
172	December 30, 1967	Williams Arena; Minneapolis, MN	Minnesota	3–1
173	January 12, 1968	Weinberg Coliseum; Ann Arbor, MI	Michigan	3–2
174	January 13, 1968	Weinberg Coliseum; Ann Arbor, MI	Michigan	7–6
175	January 26, 1968	Williams Arena; Minneapolis, MN	Michigan	5–4
176	January 27, 1968	Williams Arena; Minneapolis, MN	Michigan	7–4
177	March 5, 1968	Williams Arena; Minneapolis, MN	Minnesota	5–3
178	December 27, 1968	Dane County Coliseum; Madison, WI	Michigan	6–4
179	January 31, 1969	Weinberg Coliseum; Ann Arbor, MI	Minnesota	6–3
180	February 1, 1969	Weinberg Coliseum; Ann Arbor, MI	Michigan	5–0
181	February 14, 1969	Williams Arena; Minneapolis, MN	Minnesota	4–3
182	February 15, 1969	Williams Arena; Minneapolis, MN	Michigan	4–2
183	March 7, 1969	Weinberg Coliseum; Ann Arbor, MI	Michigan	8–4
184	December 23, 1969	Weinberg Coliseum; Ann Arbor, MI	Michigan	6–1
185	January 23, 1970	Williams Arena; Minneapolis, MN	Minnesota	8–6
186	January 24, 1970	Williams Arena; Minneapolis, MN	Minnesota	6–3
187	March 6, 1970	Weinberg Coliseum; Ann Arbor, MI	Minnesota	6–4
188	March 7, 1970	Weinberg Coliseum; Ann Arbor, MI	Michigan	4–2
189	February 26, 1971	Williams Arena; Minneapolis, MN	Minnesota	7–3
190	February 27, 1971	Williams Arena; Minneapolis, MN	Minnesota	6–5^{OT}
191	March 3, 1972	Weinberg Coliseum; Ann Arbor, MI	Michigan	5–3
192	March 4, 1972	Weinberg Coliseum; Ann Arbor, MI	Michigan	4–3
193	December 1, 1972	Weinberg Coliseum; Ann Arbor, MI	Michigan	7–6
194	December 2, 1972	Weinberg Coliseum; Ann Arbor, MI	Minnesota	7–3
195	February 16, 1973	Williams Arena; Minneapolis, MN	Minnesota	4–1
196	February 17, 1973	Williams Arena; Minneapolis, MN	Minnesota	3–2
197	November 9, 1973	Williams Arena; Minneapolis, MN	Tie	4–4^{OT}
198	November 10, 1973	Williams Arena; Minneapolis, MN	Michigan	4–3
199	January 25, 1974	Yost Ice Arena; Ann Arbor, MI	Minnesota	4–2
200	January 26, 1974	Yost Ice Arena; Ann Arbor, MI	Michigan	5–3
201	March 16, 1974	Williams Arena; Minneapolis, MN	Minnesota	5–1
202	March 17, 1974	Williams Arena; Minneapolis, MN	Minnesota	5–4
203	November 15, 1974	Williams Arena; Minneapolis, MN	Michigan	10–1
204	November 16, 1974	Williams Arena; Minneapolis, MN	Minnesota	7–5
205	January 24, 1975	Yost Ice Arena; Ann Arbor, MI	Michigan	5–2
206	January 25, 1975	Yost Ice Arena; Ann Arbor, MI	Minnesota	5–2
207	March 8, 1975	Williams Arena; Minneapolis, MN	Tie	3–3
208	March 9, 1975	Williams Arena; Minneapolis, MN	Minnesota	5–2
209	January 23, 1976	Yost Ice Arena; Ann Arbor, MI	Michigan	7–3
210	January 24, 1976	Yost Ice Arena; Ann Arbor, MI	Michigan	5–3
211	February 27, 1976	Williams Arena; Minneapolis, MN	Michigan	5–2
212	February 28, 1976	Williams Arena; Minneapolis, MN	Minnesota	7–4
213	November 5, 1976	Yost Ice Arena; Ann Arbor, MI	Michigan	8–6
214	November 6, 1976	Yost Ice Arena; Ann Arbor, MI	Michigan	6–3
215	February 18, 1977	Williams Arena; Minneapolis, MN	Michigan	3–1
216	February 19, 1977	Williams Arena; Minneapolis, MN	Michigan	7–6

No.	Date	Location	Winner	Score
217	November 18, 1977	Yost Ice Arena; Ann Arbor, MI	Michigan	7–3
218	November 19, 1977	Yost Ice Arena; Ann Arbor, MI	Michigan	7–5
219	January 14, 1978	Williams Arena; Minneapolis, MN	Minnesota	5–3
220	January 15, 1978	Williams Arena; Minneapolis, MN	Minnesota	5–2
221	December 2, 1978	Williams Arena; Minneapolis, MN	Minnesota	8–2
222	December 3, 1978	Williams Arena; Minneapolis, MN	Minnesota	10–5
223	January 5, 1979	Yost Ice Arena; Ann Arbor, MI	Minnesota	10–1
224	January 6, 1979	Yost Ice Arena; Ann Arbor, MI	Minnesota	3–0
225	November 2, 1979	Yost Ice Arena; Ann Arbor, MI	Michigan	5–2
226	November 3, 1979	Yost Ice Arena; Ann Arbor, MI	Michigan	3–2
227	January 14, 1980	Williams Arena; Minneapolis, MN	Michigan	7–3
228	January 15, 1980	Williams Arena; Minneapolis, MN	Minnesota	6–2
229	October 31, 1980	Williams Arena; Minneapolis, MN	Minnesota	9–4
230	November 1, 1980	Williams Arena; Minneapolis, MN	Minnesota	5–2
231	January 23, 1981	Yost Ice Arena; Ann Arbor, MI	Minnesota	6–2
232	January 24, 1981	Yost Ice Arena; Ann Arbor, MI	Minnesota	7–3
233	December 5, 1986	Mariucci Arena; Minneapolis, MN	Minnesota	11–2
234	December 6, 1986	Mariucci Arena; Minneapolis, MN	Minnesota	5–2
235	November 8, 1991	Yost Ice Arena; Ann Arbor, MI	Michigan	7–3
236	November 9, 1991	Yost Ice Arena; Ann Arbor, MI	Michigan	7–6
237	November 26, 1993	The Palace of Auburn Hills; Auburn Hills, MI	Michigan	6–0
238	November 26, 1994	St. Paul Civic Center; Saint Paul, MI	Minnesota	4–3
239	November 25, 1995	Bradley Center; Milwaukee, WI	No. 5 Minnesota	3–2
240	March 24, 1996	Munn Ice Arena; East Lansing, MI	No. 2 Michigan	4–3
241	November 29, 1996	Joe Louis Arena; Detroit, MI	No. 1 Michigan	4–3^{OT}
242	March 23, 1997	Van Andel Arena; Grand Rapids, MI	No. 1 Michigan	7–4
243	October 10, 1997	Target Center; Minneapolis, MN	No. 9 Michigan	3–2
244	November 23, 1997	Yost Ice Arena; Ann Arbor, MI	Michigan	4–3
245	November 27, 1998	Mariucci Arena; Minneapolis, MN	No. 4 Michigan	3–2
246	November 26, 1999	Yost Ice Arena; Ann Arbor, MI	Minnesota	6–1
247	November 25, 2000	Mariucci Arena; Minneapolis, MN	No. 7 Michigan	4–1
248	November 23, 2001	Yost Ice Arena; Ann Arbor, MI	No. 1 Minnesota	5–2
249	April 4, 2002	Xcel Energy Center; Saint Paul, MN	No. 3 Minnesota	3–2
250	December 25, 2002	Mariucci Arena; Minneapolis, MN	No. 8 Michigan	3–1
251	April 10, 2003	HSBC Arena; Buffalo, NY	No. 4 Minnesota	3–2^{OT}
252	November 29, 2003	Yost Ice Arena; Ann Arbor, MI	Minnesota	4–2
253	November 26, 2004	Mariucci Arena; Minneapolis, MN	No. 3 Minnesota	5–1
254	November 25, 2005	Yost Ice Arena; Ann Arbor, MI	No. 7 Minnesota	6–3
255	November 25, 2006	Mariucci Arena; Minneapolis, MN	No. 1 Minnesota	8–2
256	October 4, 2007	Xcel Energy Center; Saint Paul, MN	No. 5 Minnesota	4–3
257	November 24, 2007	Yost Ice Arena; Ann Arbor, MI	No. 2 Michigan	5–1
258	November 28, 2008	Mariucci Arena; Minneapolis, MN	No. 14 Michigan	6–3
259	November 27, 2009	Yost Ice Arena; Ann Arbor, MI	Michigan	6–0
260	November 28, 2010	Mariucci Arena; Minneapolis, MN	No. 15 Minnesota	3–1
261	February 14, 2014	Mariucci Arena; Minneapolis, MN	No. 2 Minnesota	5–3
262	February 15, 2014	Mariucci Arena; Minneapolis, MN	No. 2 Minnesota	4–1
263	March 14, 2014	Yost Ice Arena; Ann Arbor, MI	No. 1 Minnesota	3–2^{OT}
264	March 15, 2014	Yost Ice Arena; Ann Arbor, MI	No. 13 Michigan	6–2
265	January 9, 2015	Yost Ice Arena; Ann Arbor, MI	Michigan	4–3^{OT}
266	January 10, 2015	Yost Ice Arena; Ann Arbor, MI	Michigan	7–5
267	February 13, 2015	Mariucci Arena; Minneapolis, MN	Minnesota	6–2
268	February 14, 2015	Mariucci Arena; Minneapolis, MN	Minnesota	2–0
269	March 21, 2015	Joe Louis Arena; Detroit, MI	No. 13 Minnesota	4–2
270	December 11, 2015	Yost Ice Arena; Ann Arbor, MI	No. 9 Michigan	8–3

No.	Date	Location	Winner	Score
271	December 12, 2015	Yost Ice Arena; Ann Arbor, MI	Minnesota	3–2
272	February 25, 2016	Mariucci Arena; Minneapolis, MN	No. 6 Michigan	6–2
273	February 26, 2016	Mariucci Arena; Minneapolis, MN	No. 20 Minnesota	3–2
274	March 19, 2016	Xcel Energy Center; Saint Paul, MN	No. 7 Michigan	5–3
275	January 13, 2017	Mariucci Arena; Minneapolis, MN	No. 9 Minnesota	5–2
276	January 14, 2017	Mariucci Arena; Minneapolis, MN	No. 9 Minnesota	4–2
277	March 3, 2017	Yost Ice Arena; Ann Arbor, MI	Michigan	5–3
278	March 4, 2017	Yost Ice Arena; Ann Arbor, MI	No. 5 Minnesota	4–1
279	November 10, 2017	Yost Ice Arena; Ann Arbor, MI	Michigan	5–4
280	November 11, 2017	Yost Ice Arena; Ann Arbor, MI	Tie	4–4
281	January 12, 2018	3M Arena at Mariucci; Minneapolis, MN	Michigan	5–3
282	January 13, 2018	3M Arena at Mariucci; Minneapolis, MN	Michigan	3–1
283	December 7, 2018	Yost Ice Arena; Ann Arbor, MI	Tie	2–2
284	December 8, 2018	Yost Ice Arena; Ann Arbor, MI	Minnesota	4–3
285	February 1, 2019	3M Arena at Mariucci; Minneapolis, MN	Michigan	4–2
286	February 2, 2019	3M Arena at Mariucci; Minneapolis, MN	Minnesota	4–3
287	March 8, 2019	3M Arena at Mariucci; Minneapolis, MN	Minnesota	3–2^{OT}
288	March 9, 2019	3M Arena at Mariucci; Minneapolis, MN	Minnesota	4–1
289	November 8, 2019	Yost Ice Arena; Ann Arbor, MI	Tie	1–1
290	November 9, 2019	Yost Ice Arena; Ann Arbor, MI	Minnesota	3–1
291	February 28, 2020	3M Arena at Mariucci; Minneapolis, MN	Tie	2–2
292	February 29, 2020	3M Arena at Mariucci; Minneapolis, MN	Michigan	2–1
293	February 8, 2021	Yost Ice Arena; Ann Arbor, MI	No. 4 Minnesota	3–1
294	February 9, 2021	Yost Ice Arena; Ann Arbor, MI	No. 4 Minnesota	4–0
295	March 5, 2021	3M Arena at Mariucci; Minneapolis, MN	No. 7 Michigan	5–2
296	March 6, 2021	3M Arena at Mariucci; Minneapolis, MN	No. 3 Minnesota	4–2
297	March 15, 2021	Compton Family Ice Arena; South Bend, IN	No. 4 Minnesota	3–2^{OT}
298	December 3, 2021	Yost Ice Arena; Ann Arbor, MI	No. 11 Minnesota	5–1
299	December 4, 2021	Yost Ice Arena; Ann Arbor, MI	No. 3 Michigan	6–2
300	January 21, 2022	3M Arena at Mariucci; Minneapolis, MN	No. 11 Minnesota	2–1
301	January 22, 2022	3M Arena at Mariucci; Minneapolis, MN	No. 3 Michigan	4–1
302	March 19, 2022	3M Arena at Mariucci; Minneapolis, MN	No. 4 Michigan	4–3
303	November 17, 2022	Yost Ice Arena; Ann Arbor, MI	No. 2 Minnesota	5–2
304	November 18, 2022	Yost Ice Arena; Ann Arbor, MI	No. 2 Minnesota	6–3
305	January 20, 2023	3M Arena at Mariucci; Minneapolis, MN	No. 2 Minnesota	4–3
306	January 21, 2023	3M Arena at Mariucci; Minneapolis, MN	No. 8 Michigan	5–4
307	March 18, 2023	3M Arena at Mariucci; Minneapolis, MN	No. 4 Michigan	4–3
308	November 10, 2023	Yost Ice Arena; Ann Arbor, MI	No. 6 Minnesota	4–3
309	November 11, 2023	Yost Ice Arena; Ann Arbor, MI	Tie	2–2
310	March 1, 2024	3M Arena at Mariucci; Minneapolis, MN	No. 8 Minnesota	6–2
311	March 2, 2024	3M Arena at Mariucci; Minneapolis, MN	No. 16 Michigan	6–5^{OT}
312	March 16, 2024	3M Arena at Mariucci; Minneapolis, MN	No. 11 Michigan	2–1
313	December 6, 2024	3M Arena at Mariucci; Minneapolis, MN	No. 4 Minnesota	6–0
314	December 7, 2024	3M Arena at Mariucci; Minneapolis, MN	No. 4 Minnesota	2–0
315	February 14, 2025	Yost Ice Arena; Ann Arbor, MI	No. 14 Michigan	3–2^{OT}
316	February 15, 2025	Yost Ice Arena; Ann Arbor, MI	Tie	2–2
317	January 16, 2026	3M Arena at Mariucci; Minneapolis, MN	No. 1 Michigan	5–1
318	January 17, 2026	3M Arena at Mariucci; Minneapolis, MN	No. 1 Michigan	3^{OT}–2
319	February 26, 2026	Yost Ice Arena; Ann Arbor, MI	Minnesota	4–2
320	February 27, 2026	Yost Ice Arena; Ann Arbor, MI	No. 1 Michigan	4–2
Series: Minnesota leads 157–143–20

== Series facts ==
Statistic	Michigan	Minnesota
Games played	320	
Wins	143	157
Home wins	75	91
Road wins	57	57
Neutral site wins	11	9
Goals scored	1,033	1,146
Most goals scored in a game by one team	12 (February 19, 1951)	15 (February 3, 1945)
Most goals in a game by both teams	18 (March 4, 1967 – Minnesota 10, Michigan 8)	
Fewest goals in a game by both teams	1 (8 occurrences)	
Fewest goals scored in a game by one team in a win	1 (1925, 1927, 1931)	1 (1927, 1930, 1932, 1934, 1936)
Most goals scored in a game by one team in a loss	8 (March 4, 1967)	6 (6 occurrences)
Largest margin of victory	10 (February 19, 1951)	13 (February 3, 1945)
Longest winning streak	16 (February 18, 1949 – January 19, 1952)	12 (January 19, 1939 – March 1, 1941)
Longest unbeaten streak	16 (February 18, 1949 – January 19, 1952)	12 (January 19, 1939 – March 1, 1941)
