= 1995–96 Michigan Wolverines men's ice hockey season =

National champion Great Lakes Invitational, champion CCHA, co-champion CCHA tournament, champion NCAA tournament, champion
- Conference: T–1st CCHA
- Home ice: Yost Ice Arena

Rankings
- American Hockey Magazine: 2

Record
- Overall: 34–7–2
- Conference: 22–6–2
- Home: 15–1–1
- Road: 8–5–1
- Neutral: 11–1–0

Coaches and captains
- Head coach: Red Berenson
- Assistant coaches: Mel Pearson; Billy Powers
- Captain: Steven Halko
- Alternate captain: Brendan Morrison

The 1995–96 Michigan Wolverines men's ice hockey team represented the University of Michigan in intercollegiate college ice hockey during the 1995–96 NCAA Division I men's ice hockey season. The head coach was Red Berenson and the team captain was Steven Halko. The team played its home games in the Yost Ice Arena on the university campus in Ann Arbor, Michigan. The team finished tied for first in the Central Collegiate Hockey Association regular season, won the CCHA tournament and the 1996 NCAA Division I men's ice hockey tournament.

== Season ==
Coming off of its 5th consecutive 30+ win season, 3rd Frozen Four appearance in 4 years and returning both the NCAA's scoring leader (Brendan Morrison) and wins leader (Marty Turco) the 1995–96 Michigan Wolverines were expected to again compete for the national title. Michigan was second in the preseason rankings by American Hockey Magazine, the first time that any poll was nationally recognized.

=== Fast start ===
Even though they dominated an outclassed Guelph squad in one of the last seasons that the NCAA permitted official games against CIS schools, Michigan opened its conference schedule against Western Michigan and fell flat on its face. The Wolverines lost the first game 2–7 at home before salvaging the weekend with a 3–2 road win. While the Wolverines dropped to fifth in the polls, they were down three forwards for the big game against Maine. The first annual US Hockey Hall of Fame Game was a rematch of last year's national semifinal, the then-longest game in NCAA tournament history, but with Morrison still recovering from a knee sprain and both Matt Herr and John Madden suspended for the game, fortunately for the Wolverines, Madden's suspension was reversed and he was allowed to play in the game. Despite facing 37 shots and 9 power plays from the Black Bears Turco dominated throughout the game, surrendering only three goals while his counterpart Blair Allison allowed 6 goals on just 23 attempts.

After the high-profile win, Michigan won each game over the next three weekends and temporarily regained its #2 ranking. During that span Morrison returned from his injury and his 3-point night showed he was more than ready. Michigan also shut but out the opposition for the second time that season but with Turco sharing the net with Gregg Malicke on both occasions no goaltender received credit for either '0'.

=== Mid-season hiccup ===
The Wolverines headed into the third annual College Hockey Showcase ranked third and after an easy win against Wisconsin the Wolverines looked a bit flat against #5 Minnesota, dropping the game 2–3.

Three days later Michigan faced off against arch-rival Michigan State and though the Spartans were unranked at the time they were still a force to contend with. MSU handed the Wolverines their second consecutive loss and, with #8 Bowling Green up next, Michigan was in jeopardy of dropping from the polls. An offensive outburst of 5 goals in the first period helped arrest Michigan's slide and the 8–1 win gave the voters enough confidence in the Maize and Blue to keep them at the #4 spot. One side story with the game was Jason Botterill, a first round pick of the Dallas Stars, had already been suspended twice for fighting and was piling up unneeded penalty minutes. In the Bowling Green Game he was finally able to keep his nose clean while retaining his physical game, performing exactly how coach Red Berenson hoped he would.

Michigan Would end the first half of its season with an oddly scheduled weekend where they won at home against Lake Superior State then lost in their worst offensive performance of the season at #10 Western Michigan. The loss to the Broncos was even worse considering that Michigan had finally claimed the top spot in the CCHA from WMU the day before but now with the season series permanently in favor of their conference rivals Michigan was dropped back to third place.

=== Great Lakes Invitational ===
At the 31st Great Lakes Invitational, Michigan was looking to continue its run of championships. After trouncing Northern Michigan in the semifinal, the crowd of 18,000 at the Joe Louis Arena watched the Wolverines defeat #10 Michigan State for their 8th consecutive GLI title. Brendan Morrison was named as the tournament MVP for the third consecutive year after contributing on 6 of Michigan's 9 goals.

Michigan did not rest on its tournament win, completely dominating both opponents the following weekend by a combined score of 23–3. Morrison was again the star, earning 11 points in the two games and climbing up into the scoring race. Both weekends were missed by Botterill who was busy playing at the 1996 World Junior Championships, becoming the first player to win three gold medals at the event. The Wolverines continued to dominate the opposition for another two weeks winning each game and closing to within 2 points of the top spot in the CCHA with a game in hand. Botterill continued to build on his game, recording a hat-trick for the third time in 5 games.

The good times could not keep rolling, however, and the following weekend Michigan could only escape with a tie against a down Ohio State squad before losing the following night at Bowling Green. The next weekend Michigan hosted the Buckeyes and earned 3 points but had now dropped 6 points behind Michigan State for the CCHA crown.

=== Catching up ===
The schedule handed Michigan a win when the Spartans and Broncos split a weekend series, allowing the Wolverine's 2 wins to put them in second place with a showdown against MSU looming. After both teams won on Friday, Michigan and Michigan State met at the Joe Louis Arena for the second time the game remained close for 40 minutes but the Wolverine's potent offense broke the game open in the third, finding the net 5 times with the power play finishing 4 for 6 and leading Michigan to an 8–1 win and putting them 2 points back with a game in hand.

Riding high from their win, Michigan endured a nightmare weekend at #7 Lake Superior State, losing both games and bringing the Lakers into a tie for second with Blue. Fortunately Michigan's next game was against the Spartans and the conclusion of their regular season series. The Wolverines won their third game against MSU and followed that up with a win over Bowling Green. With the Spartans idle, the two points sent Michigan above Michigan State in the standings and allowed Michigan to claim a shared CCHA title with the Lakers.

=== CCHA tournament ===
The series loss to the Lakers left Michigan with the #2 seed and a first round meeting with Miami. Turco was stellar in the series, surrendering only one goal in the two-game sweep. In the semifinal they were met by the Spartans once more and the third time at 'The Joe'. The Wolverines continued their winning streak with a 6–2 win then met Lake Superior in the championship and avenged their earlier losses with a 4–3 victory.

=== NCAA tournament ===
The CCHA tournament title almost earned Michigan the #1 seed but Colorado College's superior record had them as the top western seed. The second spot for Michigan did grant them a bye into the regional semifinal where they faced WCHA champion and fifth-ranked Minnesota. The Gopher defense was stifling throughout the first half of the game, limiting Michigan to just 2 shots in the first. With the Wolverines down 1–2 in the second and in desperate need of a goal, Mike Legg for himself alone behind the Minnesota net and when no Gopher went to challenge him he had time to scoop the puck up with his stick and stash it into the top corner while he was still behind the net. 'The Michigan Goal' immediately became famous as the first time anyone scored a lacrosse-style goal during a game, or at last a game with cameras rolling. The stunned Golden Gophers continued to play well but with the tension that the Wolverines had been playing with now apparently gone, Michigan was able to score twice in the third and advance to the Frozen Four.

In Cincinnati, Michigan faced #3 Boston University who had spent much of the year as the #1 team, but the defending national champions had faltered at the end of their season and continued that trend against Michigan. Defense was the key to the game, allowing BU to only get 17 shots on goal with each being turned aside by Marty Turco for his 5th solo shutout of the season. Part of the bad game can be attributed to a damaged cooling pipe that caused the game to be delayed by 90 minutes, but the Wolveries had to endure the same wait.

The championship game saw Michigan returning for the first time since 1977 where they faced a familiar foe. The Wolvers had played Colorado College for the NCAA championship three times before, though not since 1957 (which was CC's last championship appearance), and now the top two teams in the nation were the only ones left vying for the title. Michigan opened the scoring in the first but after the Tigers' rebounded in the second Michigan found itself down 1–2. Mike Legg tied the game on the power play but neither team could regain the lead before the end of regulation. When overtime began the Michigan faithful grew worried; the Wolverines had lost in overtime in each of the previous three NCAA tournaments and desperately hoping that they were not about to see a repeat performance. Both team played conservatively for the first few minutes but when a clearing attempt from Colin Schmidt hit Morrison the puck bounced to the Wolverine alternate captain who slid the puck to Greg Crozier in the high slot. Crozier's shot was blocked but the puck bounced to Bill Muckalt who was standing off to the side of the net. Bob Needham slid to block the shot but it got on goal where Ryan Bach made the save but ended up off-balance, falling away from the front of the cage. The rebound slid to a stop at the top of the goal crease when Morrison came streaking in from the right circle and knocked the puck into a half-vacated net for Michigan's 8th national championship and 1st in 32 years.

=== Awards and honors ===
Brendan Morrison was awarded the Tournament MOP and was joined by Marty Turco and Steven Halko on the All-Tournament team. Morrison finished tied for fifth in the nation in scoring and was Michigan's lone appearance on the AHCA All-American West First Team while Kevin Hilton both players were also on the All-CCHA First Team while Halko and Jason Botterill made the Second team. Marty Turco tied the record for most wins in an NCAA season with 34 and finished second in the nation with a 2.16 goals against average but received no recognition from the voters for his accomplishments. Morrison and John Madden were the only Wolverines to receive an individual conference award, with Morrison earning Player of the Year while Madden took home the Tournament MVP.

Morrison earned The Hockey News U.S. College Player of the Year award for the first of two consecutive years. He was joined on the CCHA All-Conference first team by Kevin Hilton.

John Madden established the current NCAA Division I national record for single-season shorthanded goals (10). The team led the nation in both goals allowed per game and scoring margin per game. Hilton led the CCHA in assists (44) and points (50), while Jason Botterill led the conference in goals (26). Madden led in conference shorthanded goals (5). The team had the conference's best power play. The team had the top two, four of the top five and five of the top ten conferences scorers.

The win by Michigan also began a resurgence in popularity of the program that had been lagging far behind the football and basketball teams for years.

== Standings ==
1995–96 Central Collegiate Hockey Association standings
	Conference							Overall					
	GP	W	L	T	PTS	GF	GA	GP	W	L	T	GF	GA
Lake Superior State†	30	22	6	2	46	136	89	40	30	8	2	184	109
Michigan†*	30	22	6	2	46	178	71	43	34	7	2	239	93
Michigan State	30	22	7	1	45	115	86	42	28	13	1	154	129
Western Michigan	30	21	6	3	45	125	71	41	27	11	3	172	111
Bowling Green	30	18	11	1	37	126	106	41	26	14	1	172	138
Ferris State	30	10	17	3	23	101	120	38	13	22	3	126	196
Miami	30	9	17	4	22	99	142	36	10	22	4	119	168
Ohio State	30	8	17	5	21	82	105	34	10	19	5	94	118
Alaska-Fairbanks	30	8	22	0	16	101	142	34	10	23	1	114	152
Notre Dame	30	6	20	4	16	87	136	36	9	23	4	110	159
Illinois-Chicago	30	6	23	1	13	73	155	36	9	24	3	97	177
Championship: Michigan † indicates conference regular season champion * indicates conference tournament champion Final rankings: USA Today/American Hockey Magazine Coaches Poll Top 10 Poll

== Schedule ==
Date	Opponent^{#}	Rank^{#}	Site	Decision	Result	Record
Regular season
October 14	vs. Guelph*	#2	Yost Ice Arena • Ann Arbor, Michigan	Turco	W 8–0	1–0
October 20	vs. Western Michigan	#2	Yost Ice Arena • Ann Arbor, Michigan	Turco	L 2–7	1–1 (0–1)
October 21	at Western Michigan	#2	Lawson Arena • Kalamazoo, Michigan	Turco	W 3–2	2–1 (1–1)
October 26	vs. #3 Maine	#5	The Palace of Auburn Hills • Auburn Hills, Michigan (US Hockey Hall of Fame Game)	Turco	W 6–3	3–1 (1–1)
November 3	at Ferris State	#3	Ewigleben Arena • Big Rapids, Michigan	Turco	W 5–2	4–1 (2–1)
November 4	at Ferris State Bulldogs	#3	Ewigleben Arena • Big Rapids, Michigan	Turco	W 4–1	5–1 (3–1)
November 10	at Miami	#4	Goggin Ice Arena • Oxford, Ohio	Turco	W 5–4	6–1 (4–1)
November 11	at Miami	#4	Goggin Ice Arena • Oxford, Ohio	Turco	W 8–0	7–1 (5–1)
November 17	vs. Alaska–Fairbanks	#2	Yost Ice Arena • Ann Arbor, Michigan	Turco	W 6–1	8–1 (6–1)
November 18	vs. Alaska–Fairbanks	#2	Yost Ice Arena • Ann Arbor, Michigan	Turco	W 4–1	9–1 (7–1)
November 24	vs. Wisconsin*	#3	Bradley Center • Milwaukee, Wisconsin (College Hockey Showcase)	Turco	W 7–3	10–1 (7–1)
November 25	vs. #5 Minnesota*	#3	Bradley Center • Milwaukee, Wisconsin (College Hockey Showcase)	Turco	L 2–3	10–2 (7–1)
November 28	at Michigan State	#4	Munn Ice Arena • East Lansing, Michigan (Rivalry)	Turco	L 3–4	10–3 (7–2)
December 2	at #8 Bowling Green	#4	BGSU Ice Arena • Bowling Green, Ohio	Turco	W 8–1	11–3 (8–2)
December 8	vs. Lake Superior State	#4	Yost Ice Arena • Ann Arbor, Michigan	Turco	W 8–2	12–3 (9–2)
December 9	at #10 Western Michigan	#4	Lawson Arena • Kalamazoo, Michigan	Turco	L 0–5	12–4 (9–3)
Great Lakes Invitational
December 29	vs. Northern Michigan*	#4	Joe Louis Arena • Detroit, Michigan (Tournament Semifinal)	Turco	W 6–1	13–4 (9–3)
December 30	vs. #10 Michigan State*	#4	Joe Louis Arena • Detroit, Michigan (Tournament championship)	Turco	W 3–1	14–4 (9–3)
Regular season
January 5	vs. Ferris State	#4	Yost Ice Arena • Ann Arbor, Michigan	Turco	W 10–3	15–4 (10–3)
January 6	vs. Miami	#4	Yost Ice Arena • Ann Arbor, Michigan	Turco	W 13–0	16–4 (11–3)
January 12	vs. Illinois–Chicago	#4	Yost Ice Arena • Ann Arbor, Michigan	Turco	W 9–3	17–4 (12–3)
January 13	vs. Illinois–Chicago	#4	Yost Ice Arena • Ann Arbor, Michigan	Turco	W 9–1	18–4 (13–3)
January 16	vs. Alaska–Fairbanks	#4	Yost Ice Arena • Ann Arbor, Michigan	Turco	W 6–0	19–4 (14–3)
January 20	vs. Notre Dame	#4	Yost Ice Arena • Ann Arbor, Michigan (Rivalry)	Turco	W 11–1	20–4 (15–3)
January 26	at Ohio State	#3	OSU Ice Rink • Columbus, Ohio (Rivalry)	Turco	T 4–4 ^{OT}	20–4–1 (15–3–1)
January 27	at Bowling Green	#3	BGSU Ice Arena • Bowling Green, Ohio	Turco	L 5–6	20–5–1 (15–4–1)
February 2	vs. Ohio State	#5	Yost Ice Arena • Ann Arbor, Michigan	Turco	W 7–0	21–5–1 (16–4–1)
February 3	vs. Ohio State	#5	Yost Ice Arena • Ann Arbor, Michigan	Malicke	T 2–2 ^{OT}	21–5–2 (16–4–2)
February 9	at Notre Dame	#5	Edmund P. Joyce Center • Notre Dame, Indiana	Turco	W 4–1	22–5–2 (17–4–2)
February 10	at Illinois–Chicago	#5	UIC Pavilion • Chicago, Illinois	Turco	W 12–0	23–5–2 (18–4–2)
February 16	vs. Notre Dame	#4	The Palace of Auburn Hills • Auburn Hills, Michigan	Turco	W 5–2	24–5–2 (19–4–2)
February 17	vs. #5 Michigan State	#4	Joe Louis Arena • Detroit, Michigan	Turco	W 8–1	25–5–2 (20–4–2)
February 21	at #7 Lake Superior State	#3	Taffy Abel Arena • Sault Ste. Marie, Michigan	Turco	L 4–5 ^{OT}	25–6–2 (20–5–2)
February 22	at #7 Lake Superior State	#3	Taffy Abel Arena • Sault Ste. Marie, Michigan	Turco	L 3–7	25–7–2 (20–6–2)
March 1	vs. #3 Michigan State	#5	Yost Ice Arena • Ann Arbor, Michigan	Turco	W 3–0	26–7–2 (21–6–2)
March 2	vs. Bowling Green	#5	Yost Ice Arena • Ann Arbor, Michigan	Turco	W 7–5	27–7–2 (22–6–2)
CCHA tournament
March 8	vs. Miami*	#4	Yost Ice Arena • Ann Arbor, Michigan (CCHA Quarterfinal game 1)	Turco	W 5–1	28–7–2 (22–6–2)
March 9	vs. Miami*	#4	Yost Ice Arena • Ann Arbor, Michigan (CCHA Quarterfinal game 2)	Turco	W 3–0	29–7–2 (22–6–2)
March 15	vs. #8 Michigan State*	#2	Joe Louis Arena • Detroit, Michigan (CCHA Semifinal)	Turco	W 6–2	30–7–2 (22–6–2)
March 16	vs. #4 Lake Superior State*	#2	Joe Louis Arena • Detroit, Michigan (CCHA championship)	Turco	W 4–3	31–7–2 (22–6–2)
NCAA tournament
March 22	vs. #5 Minnesota*	#2	Munn Ice Arena • East Lansing, Michigan (Regional semifinal)	Turco	W 4–3	32–7–2 (22–6–2)
March 27	vs. #3 Boston University*	#2	Riverfront Coliseum • Cincinnati, Ohio (National semifinal)	Turco	W 4–0	33–7–2 (22–6–2)
March 29	vs. #1 Colorado College*	#2	Riverfront Coliseum • Cincinnati, Ohio (National championship)	Turco	W 3–2 ^{OT}	34–7–2 (22–6–2)
*Non-conference game. ^{#}Rankings from USCHO.com Poll. Source:

== Roster ==
No.	Nat.	Player	Class	Pos	Height	Weight	DoB	Hometown	Previous team	NHL rights
2		Mark Sakala	Senior	D	6' 0" (1.83 m)	195 lb (88 kg)	1972-02-07	Detroit, Michigan	Detroit Compuware Ambassadors (NAHL)	—
3		Andrew Berenzweig	Freshman	D	6' 2" (1.88 m)	215 lb (98 kg)	1977-08-08	Arlington Heights, Illinois	Loomis Chaffee School (USHS-Prep)	—
4		Chris Frescoln	Junior	D	6' 2" (1.88 m)	194 lb (88 kg)	1974-12-05	Milford, Michigan	Detroit Freeze (NAHL)	—
5		Peter Bourke	Junior	D	6' 0" (1.83 m)	183 lb (83 kg)	1973-06-13	Grosse Pointe Farms, Michigan	Grosse Pointe South High School (USHS–MI)	—
6		Harold Schock	Junior	D	5' 10" (1.78 m)	178 lb (81 kg)	1975-03-30	Okemos, Michigan	Kalamazoo Jr. K-Wings (NAHL)	—
7		Justin Clark	Freshman	RW	6' 3" (1.91 m)	191 lb (87 kg)	1977-01-29	Grand Rapids, Michigan	Taft School (USHS-Prep)	—
8		Matt Herr	Sophomore	C	6' 2" (1.88 m)	188 lb (85 kg)	1976-05-26	Hackensack, New Jersey	Hotchkiss School (USHS-Prep)	WSH, 93 overall 1994
9		Brendan Morrison (A)	Junior	C	5' 11" (1.8 m)	180 lb (82 kg)	1975-08-15	Pitt Meadows, British Columbia	Penticton Panthers (BCJHL)	NJD, 39 overall 1993
10		Kevin Hilton	Senior	C	5' 11" (1.8 m)	180 lb (82 kg)	1975-01-05	Trenton, Michigan	Detroit Compuware Ambassadors (NAHL)	DET, 74 overall 1993
13		Greg Crozier	Freshman	LW	6' 3" (1.91 m)	191 lb (87 kg)	1976-07-06	Calgary, Alberta	Lawrence Academy (USHS-Prep)	PIT, 73 overall 1994
15		Mike Legg	Junior	RW	6' 0" (1.83 m)	194 lb (88 kg)	1975-05-25	London, Ontario	London Nationals (WOHL)	NJD, 273 overall 1993
16		Bill Muckalt	Sophomore	RW	6' 1" (1.85 m)	185 lb (84 kg)	1974-07-15	Surrey, British Columbia	Kelowna Spartans (BCJHL)	VAN, 221 overall 1994
17		Sean Ritchlin	Freshman	RW	6' 0" (1.83 m)	183 lb (83 kg)	1977-06-15	Rochester, New York	Hotchkiss School (USHS-Prep)	—
18		John Madden	Junior	C	5' 11" (1.8 m)	180 lb (82 kg)	1973-05-04	Barrie, Ontario	Barrie Colts (COJHL)	—
19		Jason Botterill	Junior	LW	6' 4" (1.93 m)	193 lb (88 kg)	1976-05-19	Edmonton, Alberta	St. Paul's School (USHS-Prep)	DAL, 20 overall 1994
20		John Arnold	Senior	C	5' 10" (1.78 m)	178 lb (81 kg)	1972-11-30	Sudbury, Ontario	Thornhill Thunderbirds (MetJAHL)	—
23		Dale Rominski	Freshman	RW	6' 2" (1.88 m)	188 lb (85 kg)	1975-10-01	Farmington Hills, Michigan	Detroit Compuware Ambassadors (NAHL)	—
24		Steven Halko (C)	Senior	D	6' 1" (1.85 m)	185 lb (84 kg)	1974-03-08	Etobicoke, Ontario	Thornhill Thunderbirds (MetJAHL)	HTF, 225 overall 1992
25		Bobby Hayes	Freshman	C	6' 0" (1.83 m)	183 lb (83 kg)	1975-01-06	Westland, Michigan	Detroit Compuware Ambassadors (NAHL)	—
26		Chris Fox	Sophomore	D	6' 1" (1.85 m)	185 lb (84 kg)	1976-08-29	Grosse Pointe Farms, Michigan	Detroit Compuware Ambassadors (NAHL)	—
27		Blake Sloan	Junior	D	5' 10" (1.78 m)	178 lb (81 kg)	1975-07-27	Park Ridge, Illinois	US National Junior Team (WJC)	—
28		Warren Luhning	Junior	RW	6' 2" (1.88 m)	188 lb (85 kg)	1975-07-03	Edmonton, Alberta	Calgary Royals (AJHL)	NYI, 92 overall 1993
29		Gregg Malicke	Sophomore (RS)	G	6' 0" (1.83 m)	174 lb (79 kg)	1975-04-20	Rochester Hills, Michigan	Clarkson Golden Knights (ECAC)	—
30		Greg Daddario	Freshman	G	5' 7" (1.7 m)	171 lb (78 kg)	1976-08-16	Wilton, Connecticut	Loomis Chaffee School (USHS-Prep)	—
35		Marty Turco	Sophomore	G	5' 11" (1.8 m)	180 lb (82 kg)	1975-08-13	Sault Ste. Marie, Ontario	Cambridge Winter Hawks (MWJHL)	DAL, 124 overall 1994

== Scoring statistics ==
Name	Position	Games	Goals	Assists	Points	PIM
Brendan Morrison	C	35	28	44	72	41
Kevin Hilton	C	43	10	51	61	8
Bill Muckalt	RW	41	28	30	58	34
Jason Botterill	LW	37	32	25	57	143
John Madden	C	43	27	30	57	45
Warren Luhning	RW	40	20	32	52	123
Mike Legg	RW	42	15	25	40	24
Matt Herr	C	40	18	13	31	55
Blake Sloan	D	41	6	24	30	55
Harold Schock	D	43	5	20	25	68
Greg Crozier	LW	42	14	10	24	46
Bobby Hayes	C	43	8	13	21	32
Steven Halko	D	43	4	16	20	32
Dale Rominski	RW	35	8	7	15	37
Sean Ritchlin	RW	27	7	7	14	24
Chris Frescoln	D	29	1	11	12	48
Andrew Berenzweig	D	42	4	8	12	4
John Arnold	RW	36	2	6	8	20
Chris Fox	D	19	0	6	6	12
Peter Bourke	D	20	1	5	6	6
Marty Turco	G	42	0	5	5	16
Mark Sakala	D	22	0	4	4	18
Justin Clark	RW	11	1	2	3	2
Greg Daddario	G	2	0	0	0	0
Gregg Malicke	G	10	0	0	0	0
Total						

== Goaltending statistics ==
Name	Games	Minutes	Wins	Losses	Ties	Goals against	Saves	Shut outs	SV %	GAA
Greg Daddario	2	11	0	0	0	0		0	1.000	0.00
Gregg Malicke	10	248	0	0	1	7	76	0	.916	1.69
Marty Turco	42	2334	34	7	1	84	724	5	.896	2.16
Total	43		34	7	2	93		9		

== 1996 championship game ==
=== (W2) Michigan vs. (W1) Colorado College ===
March 30	Michigan	3 – 2	OT	Colorado College	Riverfront Coliseum

Scoring summary
Period	Team	Goal	Assist(s)	Time	Score
1st	UM	Bill Muckalt	Morrison	11:33	1–0 UM
2nd	CC	Peter Geronazzo – PP	Schmidt and Rud	23:52	1–1
2nd	CC	Colin Schmidt	Geronazzo and Remackel	25:37	2–1 CC
3rd	UM	Mike Legg – PP	Halko and Schock	46:54	2–2
1st Overtime	UM	Brendan Morrison – GW	Muckalt and Crozier	63:35	3–2 UM

Shots by period
Team	1	2	3	OT	T
Michigan	3	4	10	2	19
Colorado College	5	8	8	1	23

Goaltenders
Team	Name	Saves	Goals against	Time on ice
UM	Marty Turco	21	2	
CC	Ryan Bach	16	3	

== Players drafted into the NHL ==
=== 1996 NHL entry draft ===
= NHL All-Star team	= NHL All-Star	= NHL All-Star and NHL All-Star team	= Did not play in the NHL

Round	Pick	Player	NHL team
5	109	Andrew Berenzweig	New York Islanders
6	145	Sean Ritchelin	New Jersey Devils
9	240	Justin Clark	Colorado Avalanche
