= Bill Armstrong (ice hockey, born 1966) =

Canadian ice hockey player (born 1966)

- Born: June 25, 1966 (age 59) London, Ontario, Canada
- Height: 6 ft 2 in (188 cm)
- Weight: 195 lb (88 kg; 13 st 13 lb)
- Position: Left wing
- Shot: Left
- Played for: NHL; Philadelphia Flyers; AHL; Hershey Bears; Utica Devils; Albany River Rats; IHL; Cincinnati Cyclones; Indianapolis Ice; Detroit Vipers; Grand Rapids Griffins; Orlando Solar Bears; Kansas City Blades
- NHL draft: Undrafted
- Playing career: 1989–1998

William Harold Armstrong (born June 25, 1966) is a Canadian former professional ice hockey player.

== Early life ==
Armstrong was born in London, Ontario. As a youth, he played in the 1979 Quebec International Pee-Wee Hockey Tournament with a minor ice hockey team from London, Ontario. Armstrong played at Western Michigan University from 1986 to 1989.

== Career ==
Armstrong played in one National Hockey League (NHL) game for the Philadelphia Flyers during the 1990–91 NHL season and spent the rest of his professional career in the American Hockey League (AHL) and International Hockey League (IHL). His playing career was cut short due to a brain tumor, which required surgery.

He invented a move he called a "high wrap", a lacrosse-style shot he successfully used to score goals starting in the 1993–94 AHL season with the Albany River Rats. The move was later notably used by fellow London, Ontario-born player Mike Legg, who learned it while playing shinny with Armstrong at their hometown arena during the off-season. Legg scored a goal with the Michigan Wolverines, in the high-profile 1996 NCAA Division I men's ice hockey tournament – as compared to the "maybe only 3,000 people [...] in the building" at a River Rats game – earning the move the name "Michigan goal" in the United States. The high wrap / lacrosse-style goal / Michigan goal (names used interchangeably in reporting) later gained further attention when used by Sidney Crosby, Miks Indrašis, Mikael Granlund, Andrei Svechnikov, Trevor Zegras, Kent Johnson and Connor Bedard.

== Career statistics ==
			Regular season					Playoffs
Season	Team	League	GP	G	A	Pts	PIM	GP	G	A	Pts	PIM
1984–85	London Diamonds	OHA-B	43	17	21	38	102	—	—	—	—	—
1985–86	London Diamonds	OHA-B	41	26	23	49	81	—	—	—	—	—
1986–87	Western Michigan Broncos	CCHA	43	13	20	33	86	—	—	—	—	—
1987–88	Western Michigan Broncos	CCHA	41	22	17	39	88	—	—	—	—	—
1988–89	Western Michigan Broncos	CCHA	40	23	19	42	97	—	—	—	—	—
1989–90	Hershey Bears	AHL	58	10	6	16	99	—	—	—	—	—
1990–91	Philadelphia Flyers	NHL	1	0	1	1	0	—	—	—	—	—
1990–91	Hershey Bears	AHL	70	36	27	63	150	6	2	8	10	19
1991–92	Hershey Bears	AHL	64	26	22	48	186	6	2	2	4	6
1992–93	Cincinnati Cyclones	IHL	42	14	11	25	99	—	—	—	—	—
1992–93	Utica Devils	AHL	32	18	21	39	60	—	—	—	—	—
1993–94	Albany River Rats	AHL	74	32	50	82	188	—	—	—	—	—
1994–95	Albany River Rats	AHL	76	32	47	79	115	13	6	5	11	20
1995–96	Albany River Rats	AHL	10	3	4	7	22	—	—	—	—	—
1995–96	Indianapolis Ice	IHL	12	4	5	9	13	—	—	—	—	—
1995–96	Detroit Vipers	IHL	54	34	25	59	66	12	6	2	8	15
1996–97	Grand Rapids Griffins	IHL	35	1	8	9	39	—	—	—	—	—
1996–97	Orlando Solar Bears	IHL	34	4	25	29	55	10	3	6	9	29
1997–98	Orlando Solar Bears	IHL	62	19	18	37	106	—	—	—	—	—
1997–98	Kansas City Blades	IHL	9	1	4	5	24	5	0	2	2	11
NHL totals			1	0	1	1	0	—	—	—	—	—

== See also ==
- List of players who played only one game in the NHL
