= Scott Swanson =

American ice hockey player (born 1975)

- Born: February 2, 1975 (age 51) Cottage Grove, Minnesota, USA
- Height: 6 ft 2 in (188 cm)
- Weight: 188 lb (85 kg; 13 st 6 lb)
- Position: Defenseman
- Shot: Left
- Played for: Houston Aeros; South Carolina Stingrays; Springfield Falcons; Idaho Steelheads; Colorado Eagles; Wilkes-Barre/Scranton Penguins
- NHL draft: 225th overall, 1995; Washington Capitals
- Playing career: 1995–2004

Scott Swanson (born February 2, 1975) is an American ice hockey coach and former defenseman who was an All-American for Colorado College.

== Career ==
Swanson played his junior hockey for the Omaha Lancers, helping the team win the Clark Cup in 1994. After producing more than a point per game in his final year and being named league MVP, Swanson was drafted by the Washington Capitals in the 9th round of the NHL Draft. He began attending Colorado College the following fall and joined a team that was on the ascent. In his freshman season Swanson continued to score in bunches, finishing third in the nation amongst defensemen. He helped CC reach the NCAA championship game, their first in almost 40 years, and was named to the All-Tournament Team.

Swanson took a step back the following year, seeing his point production more than halve, but was still part of a team that reached the Frozen Four. He recovered in his junior year and then posted new career highs as a senior. In his final season Swanson was named an All-American, leading the Tigers to their 6th-consecutive 20-win season and 5th-consecutive NCAA tournament appearance.

After graduating, Swanson signed professionally and spent his first year with the Houston Aeros. Swanson found him demoted to the ECHL in his second year and went on to help the South Carolina Stingrays win the 2001 Kelly Cup. He spent most of the next three years playing AA-hockey, making one final appearance at the AHL-level. After playing a single game for the Wilkes-Barre/Scranton Penguins, he finished out the year with the Colorado Eagles and then retired as a player.

In 2007, Swanson began volunteering as a coach for North Colorado Youth Hockey. five years later, he was hired on as a Director and continues to work in that capacity as of 2021.

== Career statistics ==
			Regular season					Playoffs
Season	Team	League	GP	G	A	Pts	PIM	GP	G	A	Pts	PIM
1992–93	Park High School	HSMN	—	—	—	—	—	—	—	—	—	—
1993–94	Omaha Lancers	USHL	48	9	25	34	16	—	—	—	—	—
1994–95	Omaha Lancers	USHL	48	14	46	60	22	—	—	—	—	—
1995–96	Colorado College	WCHA	42	13	35	48	16	—	—	—	—	—
1996–97	Colorado College	WCHA	44	4	16	20	22	—	—	—	—	—
1997–98	Colorado College	WCHA	42	7	32	39	24	—	—	—	—	—
1998–99	Colorado College	WCHA	42	11	41	52	16	—	—	—	—	—
1999–2000	Houston Aeros	IHL	67	6	7	13	38	6	0	1	1	6
2000–01	Springfield Falcons	AHL	22	1	10	11	10	—	—	—	—	—
2000–01	South Carolina Stingrays	ECHL	28	4	14	18	8	17	2	9	11	12
2001–02	Idaho Steelheads	WCHL	55	3	28	31	24	15	3	5	8	4
2002–03	Idaho Steelheads	WCHL	66	9	60	69	22	6	0	5	5	2
2003–04	Wilkes–Barre/Scranton Penguins	AHL	1	0	0	0	0	—	—	—	—	—
2003–04	Colorado Eagles	CHL	53	7	35	42	18	4	0	2	2	2
AHL totals			23	1	10	11	10	—	—	—	—	—
WCHL totals			121	12	88	100	46	21	3	10	13	6

== Awards and honors ==
Award	Year
USHL First Team	1993–94
USHL First Team	1994–95
USHL MVP	1994–95
All-WCHA Rookie Team	1995–96
All-WCHA Second Team	1995–96
WCHA All-Tournament Team	1996
NCAA All-Tournament Team	1996
All-WCHA Third Team	1997–98
All-WCHA First Team	1998–99
AHCA West First-Team All-American	1998–99
WCHL All-Star	2002–03
WCHL Defenseman of the Year	2002–03

Awards and achievements
Preceded by Mitch Vig	WCHA Student-Athlete of the Year; 1998–99 (with Kyle McLaughlin)	Succeeded by Jeff Scissons
