= 2002–03 WCHL season =

The 2002-03 West Coast Hockey League season was the eighth and last season of the West Coast Hockey League, a North American minor professional league. Six teams participated in the regular season, and the San Diego Gulls were the league champions.

== Teams ==
2002-03 West Coast Hockey League
Team	City	Arena
Anchorage Aces	Anchorage, Alaska	Sullivan Arena
Bakersfield Condors	Bakersfield, California	Centennial Garden
Fresno Falcons	Fresno, California	Selland Arena
Idaho Steelheads	Boise, Idaho	Bank of America Centre
Long Beach Ice Dogs	Long Beach, California	Long Beach Sports Arena
San Diego Gulls	San Diego, California	San Diego Sports Arena

=== Map of teams ===
WCHL teams

== Regular season ==
	GP	W	L	OTL	GF	GA	Pts
Idaho Steelheads	72	52	16	4	267	186	108
San Diego Gulls	72	45	22	5	245	182	95
Bakersfield Condors	72	41	22	9	253	186	91
Fresno Falcons	72	35	28	9	243	235	79
Long Beach Ice Dogs	72	22	46	4	178	280	48
Anchorage Aces	72	21	46	5	210	327	47

== Taylor Cup-Playoffs ==
Taylor Cup-Semifinals
2	San Diego Gulls	4
3	Bakersfield Condors	1
1	Idaho Steelheads	2
4	Fresno Falcons	4

Taylor Cup-Final
2	San Diego Gulls	4
4	Fresno Falcons	3
