= Michigan goal =

Ice hockey shooting tactic

In ice hockey, a Michigan goal (named by its originator as the high wrap, also known by other names) is a goal scored by an attacker starting behind the opposing net, lifting the puck onto their stick, quickly moving their stick around to a top corner of the net, and flinging the puck into the net at close range in a lacrosse-style shot.

== Creation ==
Bill Armstrong, a player for the Western Michigan University Bronco Men's ice hockey team and former minor-league hockey player, started practicing lacrosse-style shots for fun while playing for the Albany River Rats. Armstrong asked his head coach, Robbie Ftorek, whether he could try such a shot in a game; Ftorek replied, "You do it so easily, why don't you try it?" Armstrong scored four goals with the move, which he called a "high wrap," leading to appreciation from fans and local media.

Mike Legg, a winger for the Michigan Wolverines, learned about the high wrap from Armstrong. Before attempting one, Legg was skeptical about the legality of such a goal. While he was a player for the Wolverines, he would ask the referees during warmups whether such a goal would be legal or would be called high-sticking. After no referees said they would call a penalty, Legg decided to try it in a game.

In a 1996 NCAA Tournament game against the Minnesota Golden Gophers, Legg picked the puck up onto his stick behind the net and wrapped it around into the top corner of the net. Legg was awarded "Goal of the Year" by the Swedish magazine Inside Hockey. The stick he used was donated to the Hockey Hall of Fame.

== Name ==
The shooting technique is known by several different names. Bill Armstrong, the first professional player to score a goal in this way, named it a "high wrap", a variation on the wraparound. In northern Europe, players and fans call the move "Zorro" because of the similarities to a floorball trick where the stick movement makes a Z shape associated with the fictional character of the same name. In the United States, it is called a "Michigan goal" or "The Michigan", named after Mike Legg's alma mater. Canadians typically call it a lacrosse goal. In North Carolina, it is called "The Svech", short for Andrei Svechnikov, the first NHL player to score a goal in this style. Trevor Zegras's lacrosse-style goals and a lacrosse-style assist during the 2021–22 season inspired NHL on TNT studio host Liam McHugh, and many fans on Twitter, to suggest that the move be renamed "The Zegras".

== National Hockey League ==
The first successful Michigan goal attempt in the NHL came from Andrei Svechnikov of the Carolina Hurricanes, scoring against Calgary Flames goaltender David Rittich on October 29, 2019. Svechnikov scored a second such goal against the Winnipeg Jets on December 17, 2019, against future Vezina winning goaltender Connor Hellebuyck. Svechnikov scored a third Michigan goal against Boston Bruins goaltender Jeremy Swayman on April 9, 2024.

On December 7, 2021, Trevor Zegras of the Anaheim Ducks paired up with Sonny Milano to create an alley-oop variant of the Michigan goal. Zegras's maneuver was technically an assist: Zegras lifted the puck on his stick, then passed it to Milano, who was standing just in front of the Buffalo Sabres' goal, and who shot the puck down into the Sabres' net. Zegras scored a Michigan goal by himself against the Montreal Canadiens at the Bell Centre on January 27, 2022. He scored another Michigan goal against the Arizona Coyotes on April 1, 2022. Zegras's goals landed him on the North American cover of the NHL 23 video game.

In 2022, Swedish forward Filip Forsberg, who has scored a Michigan goal for the Nashville Predators, observed that goaltenders are starting to get better at defending the top corner of the net when an attacker is in the goaltender trapezoid behind the net.

On December 23, 2023, Connor Bedard scored a Michigan goal for the Chicago Blackhawks in a 7–5 loss to the St. Louis Blues. Hours later, Zegras scored a Michigan goal for the Anaheim Ducks en route to a 3–2 loss to the Seattle Kraken. It was the first time in NHL history two players scored a Michigan goal on the same day.

== PWHL ==
On March 22, 2025, Abby Roque (coincidentally a native of Michigan) from the New York Sirens scored the first Michigan goal in Professional Women's Hockey League history against the Ottawa Charge.

== International play ==
Mikael Granlund scored a Zorro goal for Finland against Russia in the 2011 World Ice Hockey Championships semifinals.

Aaron Huglen scored a Michigan goal for the United States against Canada in the semifinals of the 2018 Hlinka Gretzky Cup, an under-18 tournament.

At the 2020 World Junior Ice Hockey Championships, Nils Höglander scored a Zorro goal for Sweden in the bronze-medal game against Finland. He previously won two consecutive "goal of the year" awards in the Swedish Hockey League for similar goals.

Kent Johnson, a University of Michigan alumnus, has scored four Michigan goals in his international career, including one for Canada against the Czech Republic in the 2022 World Junior Ice Hockey Championships. Johnson scored his first Michigan goal in the NHL on March 24, 2023.

At the 2023 IIHF World Women's U18 Championship, Slovakia's Nela Lopušanová, aged 14 at the time, scored a high wrap goal in a quarterfinal game against Sweden. It was the first such goal scored at a top-level IIHF women's tournament. She scored a second one at an Olympic Qualifier game against Kazakhstan on December 12, 2024.

== Criticism ==
Some commentators have criticized the Michigan goal as showboating, a form of unsportsmanlike conduct. Filip Forsberg scored one in a blowout win as a 19-year-old, leading to rebuke from his coach and later contrition from Forsberg.

In 2003, 16-year-old Sidney Crosby scored a Michigan goal for Rimouski Océanic of the Quebec Major Junior Hockey League as Rimouski's fifth goal in a 7–1 win against the Quebec Remparts. Don Cherry of Hockey Night in Canada called Crosby a "hot dog" for his flamboyant celebration after scoring goals. "I'm not shaken by his words," Crosby told The Globe and Mail.

After the Zegras–Milano goal, John Tortorella, a panelist on The Point on the NHL on ESPN, opined that the Michigan goal was not good for the game of ice hockey, and lamented that players were now practicing Michigan goals. Arda Ocal, host of The Point, asked Tortorella what he would do if a player he coached scored a Michigan goal; Tortorella said that he would "have a talk" after the game, maintaining that he did not like goals scored in this way. Many fans and media personalities disagreed with Tortorella's opinions. "That’s the kind of mindset that keeps the creativity out of the game," said Bill Armstrong about Tortorella's comments. On his next NHL on ESPN appearance, Tortorella clarified his comments and apologized to Zegras.
