= Andrei Svechnikov =

Russian ice hockey player (born 2000)

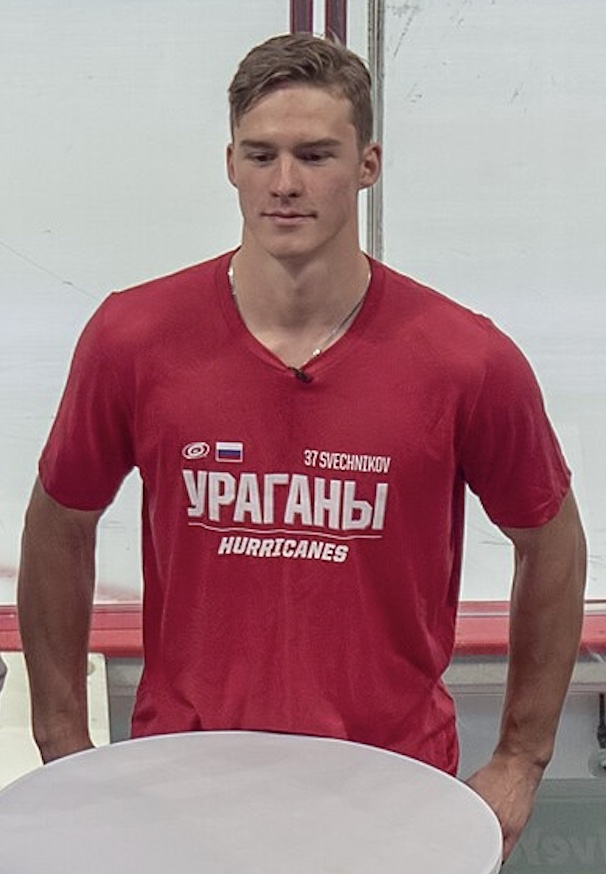
- Svechnikov in 2018
- Born: 26 March 2000 (age 26) Barnaul, Russia
- Height: 6 ft 3 in (191 cm)
- Weight: 200 lb (91 kg; 14 st 4 lb)
- Position: Winger
- Shoots: Left
- NHL team: Carolina Hurricanes
- NHL draft: 2nd overall, 2018; Carolina Hurricanes
- Playing career: 2018–present

Andrei Igorevich Svechnikov (Russian: Андрей Игоревич Свечников, IPA: [ɐnˈdrʲej ˈiɡərʲɪvʲɪtɕ svʲɪt͡ɕnʲɪˈkof]; born 26 March 2000) is a Russian professional ice hockey player who is a winger for the Carolina Hurricanes of the National Hockey League (NHL). The Hurricanes selected him second overall in the 2018 NHL entry draft. Svechnikov won the Stanley Cup with the Hurricanes in 2026.

== Playing career ==
=== Amateur ===
Svechnikov began his junior career in North America with the Muskegon Lumberjacks of the United States Hockey League (USHL). He signed a tender with the Lumberjacks in May 2016, due in part to proximity to his brother's American Hockey League (AHL) team in Grand Rapids, Michigan. In the 2016–17 season, he led the team in scoring and finished sixth overall in the league. Svechnikov was named to the All-USHL Team and declared USHL Rookie of the Year.

Svechnikov was selected first overall in the 2017 Canadian Hockey League (CHL) Import Draft by the Ontario Hockey League's (OHL) Barrie Colts. During his first season with the club, he recorded 40 goals and 32 assists for 72 points in 44 games. He was rewarded the Emms Family Award as rookie of the year. At the end of the season, he was the top-ranked North American skater by the NHL Central Scouting Bureau for the upcoming NHL entry draft. At the draft, the Carolina Hurricanes selected Svechnikov second overall. On 30 June, he signed a three-year, entry-level contract with the team.

=== Professional ===
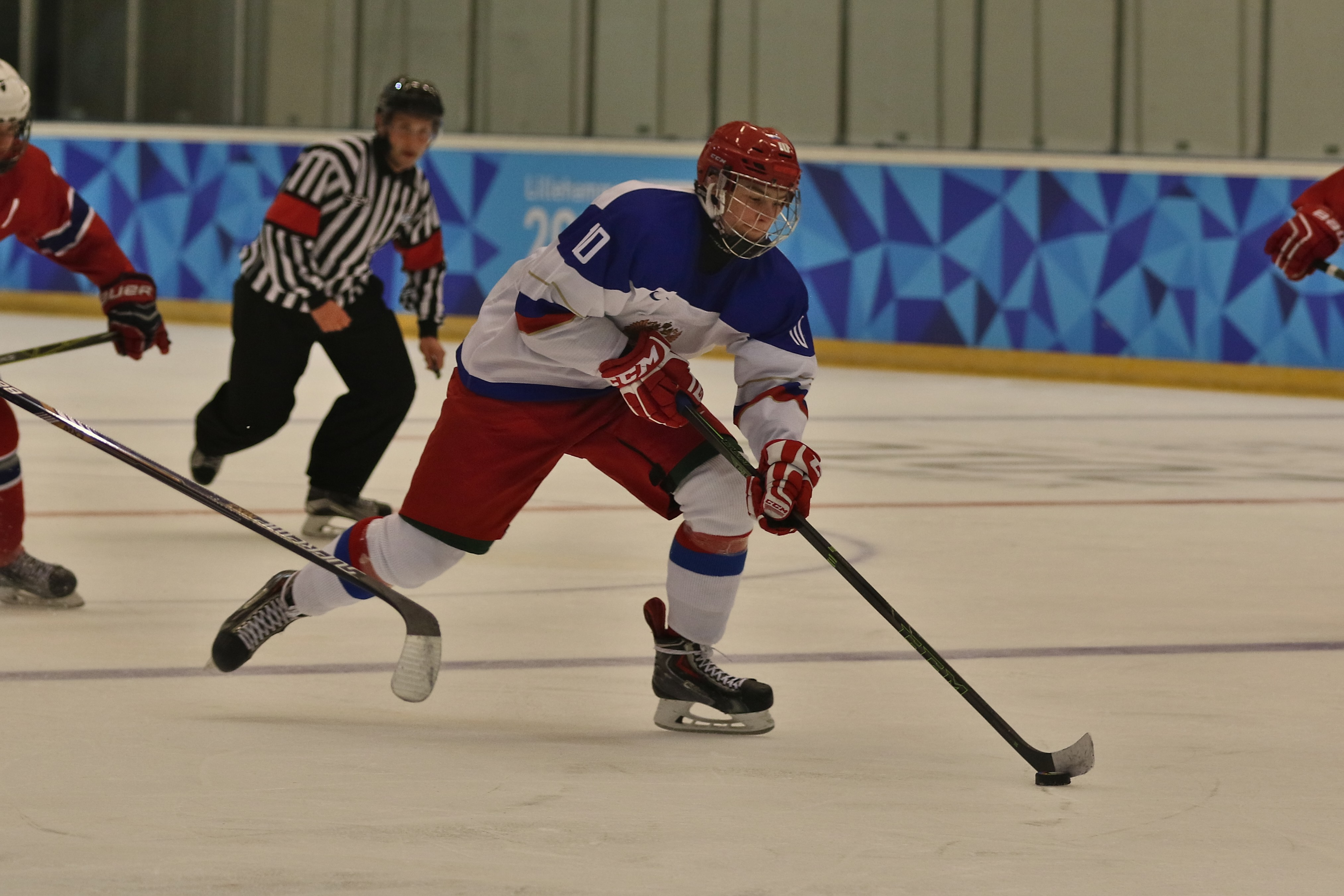
Svechnikov with Russia in 2016.

Svechnikov made his NHL debut on 4 October 2018, going scoreless in a 2–1 loss to the New York Islanders. One day later, he recorded his first career NHL point (an assist) in a 3–1 win over the Columbus Blue Jackets. On 7 October, Svechnikov scored his first career NHL goal during an 8–5 win against the New York Rangers. In doing so, he became the first player born in the 2000s to score an NHL goal. Svechnikov finished his rookie season with 20 goals and 17 assists for 37 points. He also recorded 5 points in 9 postseason games.

On 29 October 2019, Svechnikov became the first NHL player to score a Michigan goal, doing so against David Rittich in a 2–1 win over the Calgary Flames. He scored a similar goal on 17 December against the Winnipeg Jets. He greatly improved on his previous season, scoring 24 goals and 37 assists for 61 points. The Hurricanes matched up with the Rangers in the 2020 Qualifying Round. In Game 2 of the series, Svechnikov scored a hat-trick during a 4–1 win. The feat was the first in Hurricanes/Hartford Whalers franchise postseason history.

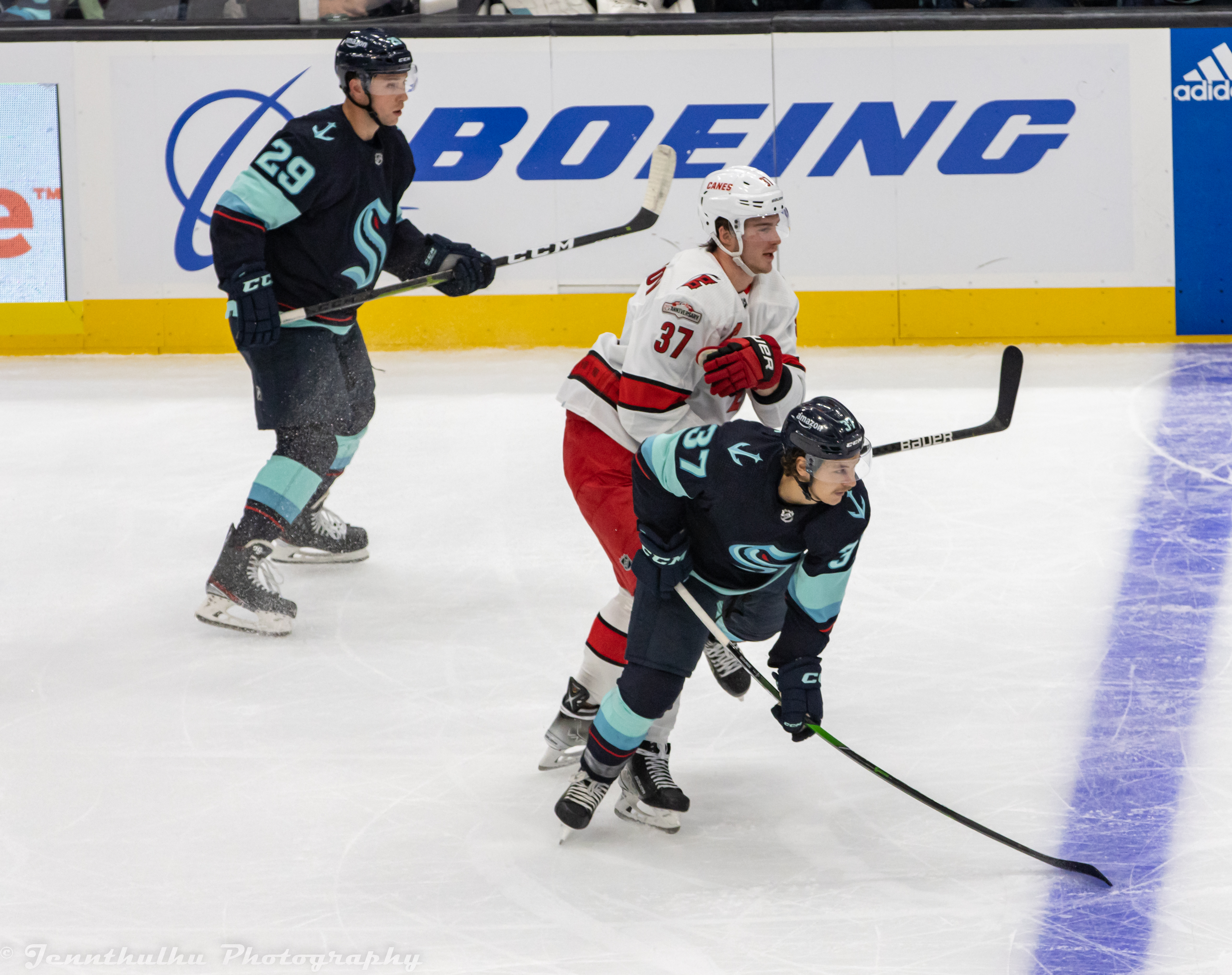
Svechnikov and Yanni Gourde of the Seattle Kraken in 2022.

On 26 August 2021, Svechnikov agreed to an eight-year, $62 million contract with the Hurricanes. On 11 March 2023, Svechnikov's 2022–23 season ended when he suffered a season-ending knee injury during a 4–0 loss to the Vegas Golden Knights. He appeared in 64 games, recording 23 goals and 32 assists for 55 points during the season.

On 14 June 2026, Svechnikov won his first Stanley Cup.

== Personal life ==
Svechnikov's older brother, Evgeny, was drafted by the Detroit Red Wings in the first round of the 2015 NHL entry draft.

Svechnikov's father, Igor, worked as a pediatrician on Sakhalin Island, but after the 1995 Neftegorsk earthquake gave up the practice and moved his family to Barnaul in Siberia, and sold cakes in the region. Svechnikov's mother, Elena, worked two jobs: reception at a hockey rink during the day, and cleaning floors at night. With Elena's connection to the hockey rink both of her sons took an early interest in hockey, and Svechnikov began skating when he was 3.

In order to help both of their sons develop in hockey, Igor and Elena moved to Moscow, though after one year they were recruited by Ak Bars Kazan, so the family moved to Kazan. When Svechnikov moved to Michigan to play in the USHL, Elena joined him, and with Evgeny playing nearby they would all frequently spend time together.

== Career statistics ==
=== Regular season and playoffs ===
			Regular season					Playoffs
Season	Team	League	GP	G	A	Pts	PIM	GP	G	A	Pts	PIM
2016–17	Muskegon Lumberjacks	USHL	48	29	29	58	68	—	—	—	—	—
2017–18	Barrie Colts	OHL	44	40	32	72	67	8	5	6	11	12
2018–19	Carolina Hurricanes	NHL	82	20	17	37	62	9	3	2	5	9
2019–20	Carolina Hurricanes	NHL	68	24	37	61	54	6	4	3	7	8
2020–21	Carolina Hurricanes	NHL	55	15	27	42	44	11	2	6	8	14
2021–22	Carolina Hurricanes	NHL	78	30	39	69	79	14	4	1	5	14
2022–23	Carolina Hurricanes	NHL	64	23	32	55	71	—	—	—	—	—
2023–24	Carolina Hurricanes	NHL	59	19	33	52	58	11	2	9	11	16
2024–25	Carolina Hurricanes	NHL	72	20	28	48	59	15	8	4	12	22
2025–26	Carolina Hurricanes	NHL	79	31	39	70	66	19	6	5	11	24
NHL totals			557	182	252	434	493	85	29	30	59	107

=== International ===
Year	Team	Event	Result	GP	G	A	Pts	PIM
2015	Russia	U17	2nd place, silver medalist(s)	6	2	3	5	6
2016	Russia	U18	6th	5	2	0	2	2
2016	Russia	IH18	3rd place, bronze medalist(s)	5	4	1	5	0
2016	Russia	U17	3rd place, bronze medalist(s)	4	5	3	8	2
2017	Russia	U18	3rd place, bronze medalist(s)	7	4	5	9	10
2018	Russia	WJC	5th	5	0	5	5	2
Junior totals				32	17	17	34	22

== Awards and honours ==
Award	Year	Ref
USHL
First All-Star Team	2017	
Rookie of the Year	2017	
OHL
Emms Family Award	2017–18	
NHL
NHL All-Star Game	2023	
Stanley Cup champion	2026	
International
World Junior A Challenge most valuable player	2016	

Awards and achievements
Preceded by Martin Nečas	Carolina Hurricanes first-round draft pick 2018	Succeeded by Ryan Suzuki
