= Trevor Zegras =

American ice hockey player (born 2001)

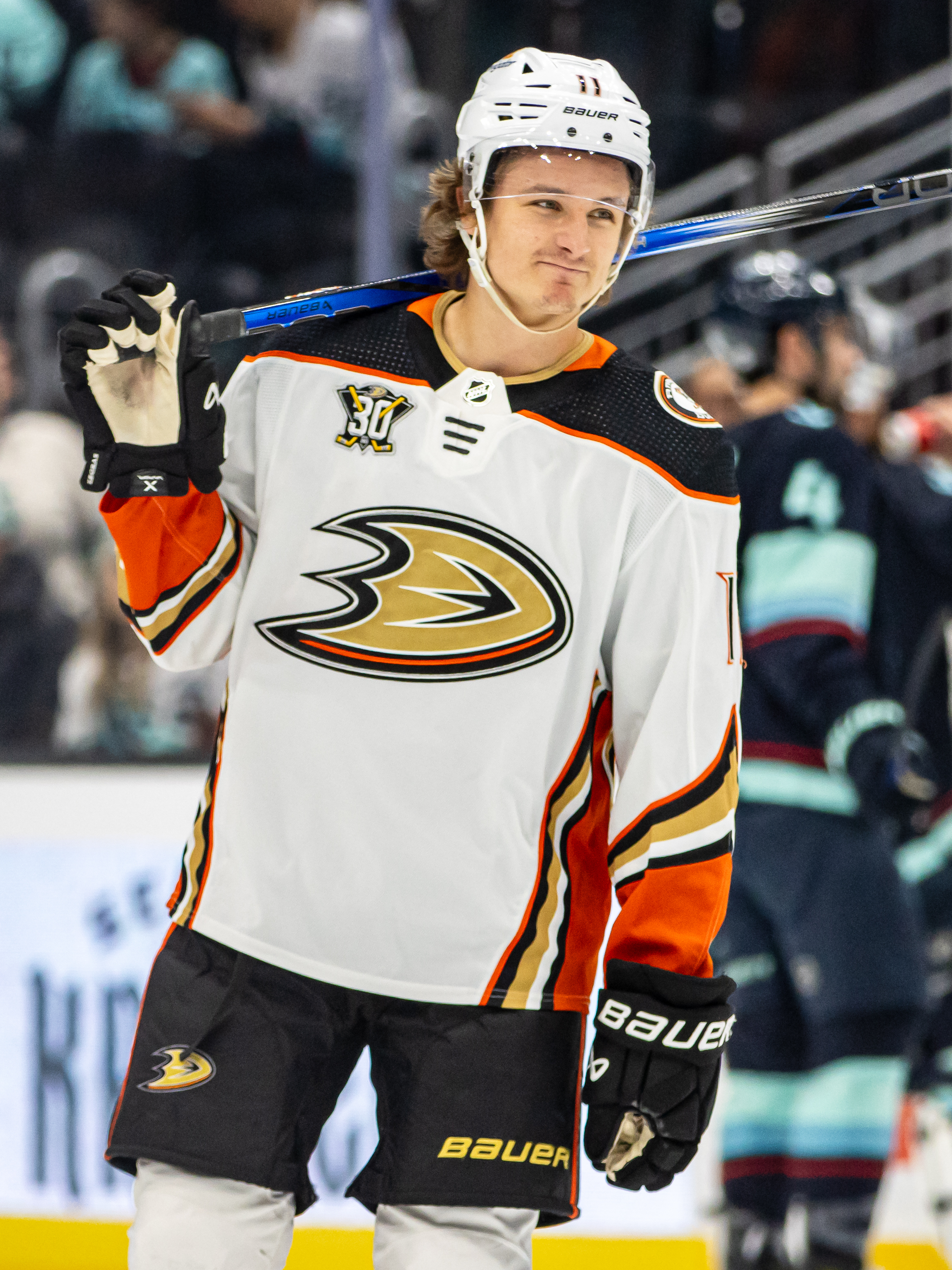
- Zegras with the Anaheim Ducks in 2024
- Born: March 20, 2001 (age 25) Bedford, New York, U.S.
- Height: 6 ft 0 in (183 cm)
- Weight: 185 lb (84 kg; 13 st 3 lb)
- Position: Center
- Shoots: Left
- NHL team Former teams: Philadelphia Flyers; Anaheim Ducks
- National team: United States
- NHL draft: 9th overall, 2019; Anaheim Ducks
- Playing career: 2021–present

Trevor John Zegras (/ˈziːɡrəs/ ZEE-grəs; born March 20, 2001) is an American professional ice hockey player who is a center for the Philadelphia Flyers of the National Hockey League (NHL). He was selected ninth overall by the Anaheim Ducks in the 2019 NHL entry draft and made his NHL debut in the 2020–21 season.

== Early life ==
Zegras was born on March 20, 2001, in Bedford, New York, to parents of Greek descent, Gary and Julie. He has two younger siblings, a brother, Griffin and a sister named Ava. He began skating at age three and played in the Rising Stars youth program alongside his cousins. At the age of 10-years-old he played against fellow NHL player Jack Hughes at the Brick Invitational Hockey Tournament, one of Canada's signature youth hockey tournaments.

Growing up, he was a fan of the New York Rangers but studied and emulated Patrick Kane of the Chicago Blackhawks.

== Playing career ==
Growing up in suburban New York, Zegras played bantam major ice hockey with the Mid Fairfield Rangers, a Tier 1 youth hockey program in Stamford, Connecticut, before joining the Avon Old Farms school's Winged Beavers of the Founders League (USHS). During his tenure with the Winged Beavers from 2016 to 2017, he recorded 18 goals and 24 assists for 42 points. As a sophomore at Avon Old Farms, Zegras attended the USA Hockey National Team Development Program's (USNTDP) top-40 tryout and qualified for the team.

Future NHL goalie Spencer Knight, who grew up in southern Connecticut, played hockey with Zegras on both the Mid Fairfield Rangers' 14U and 16U AAA teams, and then on the Winged Beavers at Avon Old Farms, and then at the USA Hockey National Team Development Program (USNTDP). While participating in the USNTDP, Zegras also reconnected with Jack Hughes and his family as they were teammates and lived close to each other during the program.

Zegras joined the USNTDP under-17 team for their 2017–18 season in the United States Hockey League (USHL), where he recorded 20 goals and 39 assists for 59 points. Following this, he joined their under-18 team in 2018–19 where he earned 87 points, including 61 assists. As a result of his play in the USHL, Zegras was drafted in the first round, ninth overall, by the Anaheim Ducks at the 2019 NHL entry draft. Despite his draft selection, Zegras kept his commitment to play college ice hockey for Boston University.

=== Collegiate ===
Zegras played 33 games for Boston University in the 2019–20 NCAA season, where he finished tied for third among Division I freshmen in points with 36. After his freshman season, Zegras was named to the Hockey East Third Team All-Star, to the Hockey East All-Rookie Team, and a finalist for Hockey East Rookie of the Year.

=== Professional ===
==== Anaheim Ducks (2021–2025) ====
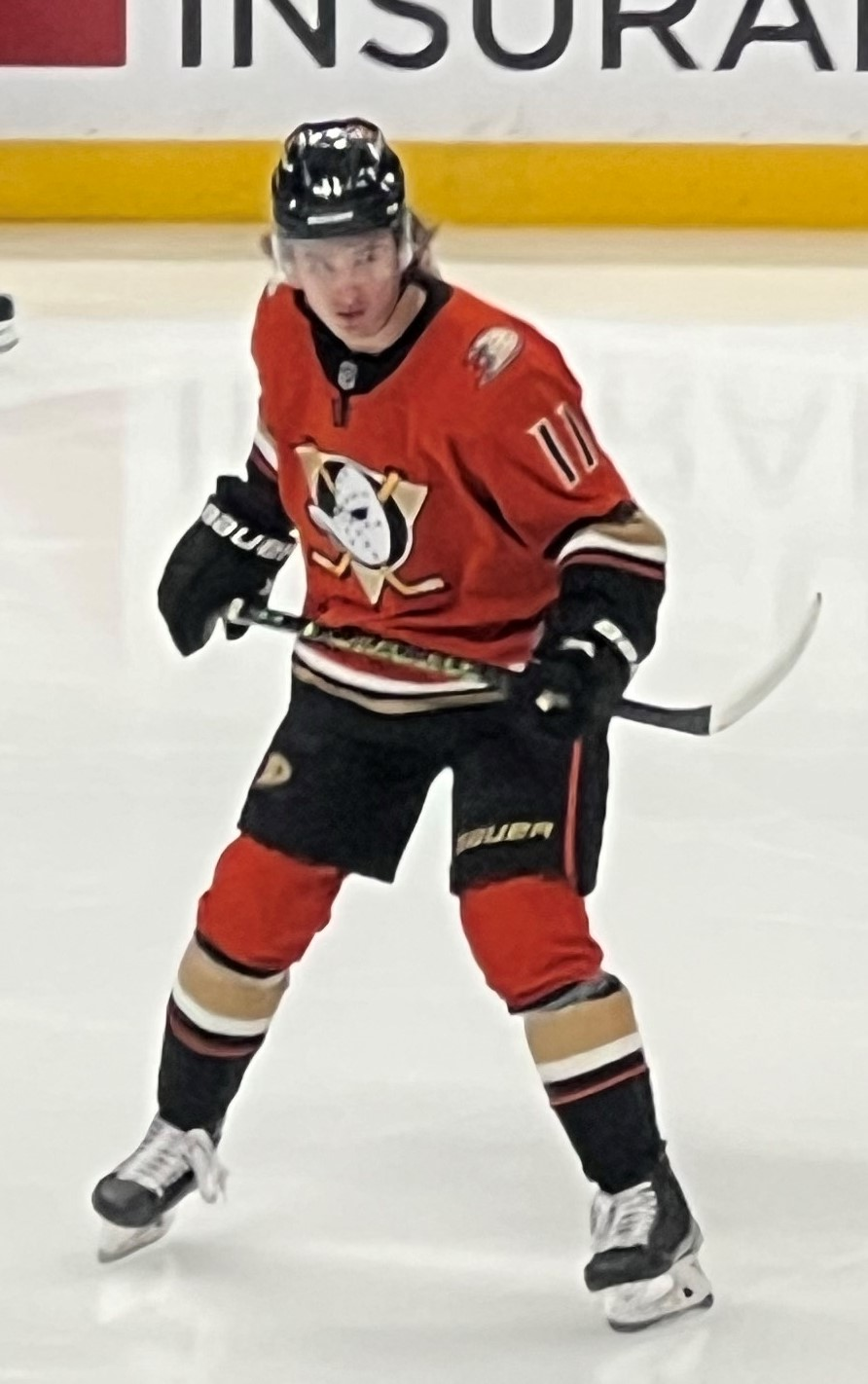
Zegras in 2022

Zegras concluded his collegiate career on March 27, 2020, by signing a three-year, entry-level contract with the Ducks. Following the signing, Zegras was reassigned to their American Hockey League (AHL) affiliate, the San Diego Gulls, to play the remainder of the 2020–21 season. On February 5, 2021, Zegras made his professional debut with Gulls and had one goal and two assists in a 4–1 win over the Bakersfield Condors. He was recalled to the NHL in late February, and made his NHL debut against the Arizona Coyotes on February 22. A few games later, on March 18, Zegras scored his first NHL goal in a 3–2 overtime win against the Arizona Coyotes. During the same game, fellow rookie Jamie Drysdale also scored, making the teammates the youngest in NHL history to score their first NHL goals less than 2:30 apart. He finished the season with 13 points through 24 games, with six points coming in his final six regular season games.

Zegras was eventually returned to the AHL in April to aid in his development and transition to the professional league. When speaking of the reassignment, executive vice president and general manager Bob Murray stated: "He's ahead of our scheduled progression, and as a result, we are moving him to center ice effective immediately. He will need some experience in the AHL first, but our expectation is that he will be back with us in the near future and play center for the Ducks for years to come." Upon returning to the AHL, Zegras made the transition from left wing to center, which resulted in an increased offensive output.

During training camp prior to the 2021–22 season, Zegras continued to play the role of center and was named to their opening night roster. Zegras quickly became a mainstay on the Ducks lineup, while playing alongside Sonny Milano and Rickard Rakell. On December 7, 2021, Zegras made a never seen before lacrosse-style assist, nicknamed "the Michigan", to Sonny Milano in a game against the Buffalo Sabres. By December, he had scored 22 points through 27 games to rank second amongst league rookies in scoring while also averaging 17 minutes of ice time. As a result of his play, Zegras was one of four Ducks players on the NHL All-Star Game fan vote ballot. He was named the NHL Rookie of the Month for December 2021, after recording 11 points in nine games. Although Zegras was not nominated for the 2022 All-Star Game, he was later named a special guest, participating in the Breakaway Challenge. Zegras finished his first full season with 23 goals and 38 assists in 75 games, and was named a finalist for the Calder Memorial Trophy, awarded to the NHL's rookie of the year; the award went to Moritz Seider. In August 2022, Zegras was named the cover athlete for NHL 23 alongside Sarah Nurse, who plays for Canada women's national ice hockey team.

The following season, Zegras led the team in all statistical categories despite missing the playoffs, while recording a career-high 65 points in 81 games and sharing the number of goals scored (23) with Troy Terry. Zegras became the third youngest player in the NHL to lead his team in points.

In the 2023–24 season, Zegras held out, missing training camp and most of the preseason. He signed a three-year, $17.25 million contract on October 2, 2023. He struggled to begin the season, recording only two points in his first 12 games, before being placed on injured reserve with osteitis pubis. On December 23, Zegras returned from the injury after missing 20 games. In a 3–2 loss to the Seattle Kraken, Zegras recorded one of two Michigan goals scored during that night's NHL games. Seven games later, Zegras broke his ankle and missed 10 weeks, returning for the final 11 games of the season, registering eight points. He finished the season with 15 points (six goals, nine assists) over 31 games.

Zegras started the 2024–25 season scoring just three points in his first 15 games of the season. On December 4, 2024, Zegras left the game against the Vegas Golden Knights with a lower-body injury, and on December 12, it was announced that he underwent surgery to repair a torn meniscus to his right knee and would miss six weeks. He returned to the lineup on January 21, 2025, in a 5–2 loss against the Florida Panthers. Zegras finished the season with 32 points (12 goals, 20 assists) over 57 games.

==== Philadelphia Flyers (2025–present) ====
On June 23, 2025, Zegras was traded to the Philadelphia Flyers for Ryan Poehling, a 2025 second-round pick, and a 2026 fourth-round pick. The trade allowed him the opportunity to return to his natural position of center, and reunited him with former Ducks teammate Jamie Drysdale and childhood friend Cam York. Asked at his introductory press conference what had gone wrong in Anaheim, Zegras joked, "Seasonal depression... Every day felt the exact same for five years." In his first game back in Anaheim, he scored a goal and celebrated by miming hanging up a phone, later saying, "That's about how quick the phone call was before, so I thought it'd be good." On March 29, 2026, he tied his career high for goals, 23, after scoring in overtime against the Dallas Stars. He finished the season with a career high 67 points (26 goals, 41 assists) in 81 games, ranking second on the team in points and goals and tying Travis Konecny for the team lead in assists. Zegras made his Stanley Cup playoff debut that spring and led the team with six points (two goals, four assists) in 10 games.

On July 16, 2026, the Flyers re-signed Zegras to a four-year, $36.5 million contract, making him the highest-paid player on the Flyers.

== International play ==
Medal record

Men's ice hockey

Representing the United States

World Junior Championships
| Gold medal – first place | 2021 Canada | |

World U18 Championship
| Bronze medal – third place | 2019 Sweden | |

World U-17 Hockey Challenge
| Gold medal – first place | 2017 Canada | |

Zegras represented the United States in 2017 at the World U-17 Hockey Challenge where the U.S. won the gold medal. He finished fourth on the team in points, recording six points (two goals, four assists) in six games. In 2019, Zegras represented the United States at the World U18 Championships, winning bronze. He was tied for second in tournament assists among all players, recording nine assists in five games.

On January 5, 2021, Zegras, representing the United States junior team at the 2021 World Junior Championships, won the gold medal over Canada junior team, scoring one goal and recording one assist in 2–0 win. He was named World Juniors MVP after recording seven goals and recording 11 assists during the tournament, which he also led in scoring. He also tied the United States points record held by Jordan Schroeder. In October 2021, he won the Bob Johnson Award, recognizing excellence in international ice hockey competitions.

Zegras was named to the senior team, representing the United States, at the 2024 World Championship. He registered two points (one goal, one assist) with the U.S. finishing in fifth place.

== Personal life ==
Zegras' paternal grandfather, Peter S. Zegras, was the president of the fashion and designer fragrance division of Revlon in New York. Trevor Zegras is also paternal cousins with freestyle skier Mac Forehand.

From July 2023 to 2026, Zegras was in a highly publicized relationship with social media personality and singer Dixie D'Amelio.

After signing his entry-level contract with the Ducks, Zegras lived for a year with the family of Cam York, a Southern California native. He later lived for two years with Ducks teammate Jamie Drysdale, until Drysdale was traded to Philadelphia in 2024. In February 2026, it was reported that Zegras had begun housing rookie Denver Barkey a few weeks after Barkey's December call-up in his Center City home. In September 2026, Zegras posted an Instagram video showing that rookie Porter Martone and veteran Christian Dvorak had also moved in.

== Career statistics ==
=== Regular season and playoffs ===
| | | | Regular season | | | | | Playoffs |
| Season | Team | League | GP | G | A | Pts | PIM | GP | G | A | Pts | PIM |
|---|---|---|---|---|---|---|---|---|---|---|---|---|
| 2016–17 | Avon Old Farms | USHS | 28 | 18 | 24 | 42 | 18 | — | — | — | — | — |
| 2017–18 | U.S. NTDP Juniors | USHL | 31 | 11 | 21 | 32 | 32 | 8 | 1 | 5 | 6 | 2 |
| 2017–18 | U.S. NTDP U17 | USDP | 56 | 30 | 29 | 59 | 42 | — | — | — | — | — |
| 2018–19 | U.S. NTDP Juniors | USHL | 27 | 14 | 26 | 40 | 34 | — | — | — | — | — |
| 2018–19 | U.S. NTDP U18 | USDP | 60 | 26 | 61 | 87 | 94 | — | — | — | — | — |
| 2019–20 | Boston University | HE | 33 | 11 | 25 | 36 | 43 | — | — | — | — | — |
| 2020–21 | San Diego Gulls | AHL | 17 | 10 | 11 | 21 | 12 | 3 | 1 | 2 | 3 | 0 |
| 2020–21 | Anaheim Ducks | NHL | 24 | 3 | 10 | 13 | 12 | — | — | — | — | — |
| 2021–22 | Anaheim Ducks | NHL | 75 | 23 | 38 | 61 | 50 | — | — | — | — | — |
| 2022–23 | Anaheim Ducks | NHL | 81 | 23 | 42 | 65 | 88 | — | — | — | — | — |
| 2023–24 | Anaheim Ducks | NHL | 31 | 6 | 9 | 15 | 30 | — | — | — | — | — |
| 2024–25 | Anaheim Ducks | NHL | 57 | 12 | 20 | 32 | 23 | — | — | — | — | — |
| 2025–26 | Philadelphia Flyers | NHL | 81 | 26 | 41 | 67 | 62 | 10 | 2 | 4 | 6 | 26 |
| NHL totals | | | 349 | 93 | 160 | 253 | 265 | 10 | 2 | 4 | 6 | 26 |

=== International ===
| Year | Team | Event | Result | GP | G | A | Pts | PIM |
|---|---|---|---|---|---|---|---|---|
| 2017 | United States | U17 | 1st place, gold medalist(s) | 6 | 2 | 4 | 6 | 4 |
| 2019 | United States | U18 | 3rd place, bronze medalist(s) | 5 | 0 | 9 | 9 | 2 |
| 2020 | United States | WJC | 6th | 5 | 0 | 9 | 9 | 4 |
| 2021 | United States | WJC | 1st place, gold medalist(s) | 7 | 7 | 11 | 18 | 0 |
| 2024 | United States | WC | 5th | 8 | 1 | 1 | 2 | 4 |
| Junior totals | | | | 23 | 9 | 33 | 42 | 10 |
| Senior totals | | | | 8 | 1 | 1 | 2 | 4 |

== Awards and honors ==
| Award | Year | Ref |
College
| Hockey East All-Rookie Team | 2020 | |
| Hockey East Third All-Star Team | 2020 | |
NHL
| NHL Rookie of the Month (December) | 2021 | |
| NHL All-Rookie Team | 2022 | |
| EA Sports NHL cover athlete | 2023 | |
International
| WJC top 3 player on team | 2020, 2021 | |
| WJC MVP | 2021 | |
| WJC All-Star Team | 2021 | |
| USA WJC points record | 2021 | |

Awards and achievements
| Preceded by Isac Lundeström | Anaheim Ducks first-round draft pick 2019 | Succeeded by Brayden Tracey |
