= 1996 NCAA Division I men's ice hockey tournament =

Hockey tournament

- Teams: 12
- Finals site: Riverfront Coliseum, Cincinnati, Ohio
- Champions: Michigan Wolverines (8th title)
- Runner-up: Colorado College Tigers (5th title game)
- Semifinalists: Boston University Terriers (19th Frozen Four); Vermont Catamounts (1st Frozen Four)
- Winning coach: Red Berenson (1st title)
- MOP: Brendan Morrison (Michigan)
- Attendance: 65,778

The 1996 NCAA Division I men's ice hockey tournament involved 12 schools playing in single-elimination tournament to determine the national champion of men's National Collegiate Athletic Association (NCAA) Division I college ice hockey. It began on March 22, 1996, and ended with the championship game on March 30. A total of 11 games were played. The top two seeds in each region received a bye into the tournament quarterfinals.

In the regional semifinals, Michigan's Mike Legg scored a high wraparound goal that, in the U.S., is now known as a Michigan goal.

The University of Michigan, coached by Red Berenson, won the national championship with a 3–2 victory over Colorado College in overtime in front of 12,957 fans.

== Qualifying teams ==
The at-large bids and seeding for each team in the tournament were announced after the conference tournaments concluded. The Central Collegiate Hockey Association (CCHA) had four teams receive a berth in the tournament, the ECAC and Hockey East each had three teams receive a berth in the tournament, while the Western Collegiate Hockey Association (WCHA) had two berths.

East Regional – Albany							West Regional – East Lansing						
Seed	School	Conference	Record	Berth type	Appearance	Last bid	Seed	School	Conference	Record	Berth type	Appearance	Last bid
1	Boston University	Hockey East	29–6–3	At-large bid	22nd	1995	1	Colorado College	WCHA	31–4–4	At-large bid	10th	1995
2	Vermont	ECAC	26–6–4	At-large bid	2nd	1988	2	Michigan	CCHA	30–7–2	Tournament champion	19th	1995
3	Lake Superior State	CCHA	29–7–2	At-large bid	10th	1995	3	Minnesota	WCHA	29–9–2	Tournament champion	23rd	1995
4	Western Michigan	CCHA	27–10–3	At-large bid	3rd	1994	4	Massachusetts-Lowell	Hockey East	25–9–4	At-large bid	3rd	1994
5	Clarkson	ECAC	24–9–3	At-large bid	15th	1995	5	Michigan State	CCHA	28–12–1	At-large bid	16th	1995
6	Providence	Hockey East	21–14–3	Tournament champion	8th	1991	6	Cornell	ECAC	21–8–4	Tournament champion	11th	1991

== Game locations ==
- East Regional – Knickerbocker Arena, Albany, NY
- West Regional – Munn Ice Arena, East Lansing, MI
- Frozen Four – Riverfront Coliseum, Cincinnati, OH

== Bracket ==
First Round; March 22–23
E4	Western Michigan	1
E5	Clarkson	6
W3	Minnesota	5
W6	Providence	1
E3	Lake Superior State	5
E6	Cornell	4
W4	Massachusetts-Lowell	6
W5	Michigan State	2

Quarterfinals; March 23–24
E1	Boston University	3
E5	Clarkson	2
W2	Michigan	4
W3	Minnesota	3
E2	Vermont	2
E3	Lake Superior State	1
W1	Colorado College	5
W4	Massachusetts-Lowell	3

National Semifinals; March 28
E1	Boston University	0
W2	Michigan	4
E2	Vermont	3
W1	Colorado College	4**

National Championship; March 30
W2	Michigan	3*
W1	Colorado College	2

Note: * denotes overtime period(s)

== Results ==
=== East Regional – Albany, New York ===
==== First Round ====
March 22, 1996; 5:00 pm	(3) Lake Superior State	5–4 (2–1, 2–3, 1–0)	(6) Cornell	Knickerbocker Arena

Game reference

John Grahame
Goalies
Jason Elliott
Referees:
John Seidel
Robin Anderson
Linesman:
Jon Campion

(Lambeth, Matteucci) Jason Sessa – 01:49	1 – 0
	1 – 1	06:36 – PP – P. C. Drouin (S. Wilson, Knopp)
(Trzcinski, Matteucci) Brian Felsner – 07:00	2 – 1
(Lane, Pulente) Darcy George – 23:03	3 – 1
	3 – 2	28:57 – Jamie Papp (Doll)
(Laviolette) Keith Aldridge – SH – 32:58	4 – 2
	4 – 3	34:26 – Andre Doll (Burgoyne, Papp)
	4 – 4	37:00 – PP – Mark Scollan (Dailey, Chartrand)
(Battaglia, Blaznek) Matt Alvey – GW PP – 46:05	5 – 4

18 min
Penalties
18 min
38
Shots
28

March 22, 1996; 8:30 pm	(4) Western Michigan	1–6 (0–1, 0–1, 1–4)	(5) Clarkson	Knickerbocker Arena; Attendance: 7,513

Game reference

Marc Magliarditi (out 53:44)
Matt Barnes (in 53:44)
Goalies
Dan Murphy
Referees:
Frank Cole
Drew Taylor
Linesman:
Bill Jones

	0 – 1	09:45 – Jean-François Houle (Seitz)
	0 – 2	28:57 – GW PP – David Seitz (White, Palmer)
	0 – 3	48:51 – SH – Steve Palmer (unassisted)
	0 – 4	51:32 – PP – Matt Pagnutti (White, Palmer)
	0 – 5	53:44 – Jordan Grant (Ollila, Bates)
	0 – 6	57:59 – Dana Mulvihill (Besse, Roule)
(Brooks) Jeremy Brown – 59:27	1 – 6

45 min
Penalties
46 min
36
Shots
30

==== Quarterfinals ====
March 23, 1996; 8:30 pm	(1) Boston University	3–2 (2–0, 1–0, 0–2)	(5) Clarkson	Knickerbocker Arena; Attendance: 12,402

Game reference

Tom Noble
Goalies
Dan Murphy
Referees:
Robin Anderson
John Seidel
Linesman:
John Campion

(O'Sullivan) Chris Drury – 02:44	1 – 0
(Grier, Bates) Billy Pierce – PP – 10:40	2 – 0
(Walsh, Wood) Mike Sylvia – GW – 30:24	3 – 0
	3 – 1	45:11 – PP – Steve Palmer (Lipsett)
	3 – 2	48:01 – PP – Todd White (Seitz)

12 min
Penalties
10 min
40
Shots
22

March 23, 1996; 5:00 pm	(2) Vermont	2–1 (0–0, 1–1, 1–0)	(3) Lake Superior State	Knickerbocker Arena; Attendance: 11,524

Game reference

Tim Thomas
Goalies
John Grahame
Referees:
Frank Cole
Drew Taylor
Linesman:
Bill Jones

	0 – 1	21:47 – Mike Matteucci (Fuss)
(Perrin) Martin St. Louis – PP – 28:04	1 – 1
(Perrin, Ruid) Martin St. Louis – GW – 58:07	2 – 1

12 min
Penalties
16 min
20
Shots
33

=== West Regional – East Lansing, Michigan ===
==== First Round ====
March 23, 1996; 3:00 pm	(3) Minnesota	5–1 (1–1, 1–0, 3–0)	(6) Providence	Munn Ice Arena

Game reference

Jeff Moen
Goalies
Dan Dennis
Referees:
Mike Noeth
Harry Ammian
Linesman:
Jack Dunn

(Wasley, Kraft) Wyatt Smith – 01:43	1 – 0
	1 – 1	04:50 – Russ Guzior (Hurlberg, Sundquist)
(Checco, Kraft) Wyatt Smith – GW – 22:29	2 – 1
(Moser) Brian Bonin – 48:09	3 – 1
(Hankinson, LaFleur) Reggie Berg – 53:58	4 – 1
(Trebil, Conway) Erik Rasmussen – PP – 56:40	5 – 1

10 min
Penalties
8 min
30
Shots
21

March 23, 1996; 6:30 pm	(4) Massachusetts–Lowell	6–2 (2–0, 2–1, 2–1)	(5) Michigan State	Munn Ice Arena; Attendance: 5,497

Game reference

Martin Fillion
Goalies
Chad Alban
Referees:
Buzz Christensen
Bob Ames
Linesman:
Randy Schmidt

(Donovan, Sbrocca) Jeff Daw – PP – 07:12	1 – 0
(Concannon, Donovan) David Barrozino – 16:57	2 – 0
(Dartsch) Marc Salsman – GW – 26:52	3 – 0
(Sbrocca) Brendan Concannon – SH – 31:30	4 – 0
	4 – 1	38:52 – PP – Sean Berens (York, Watt)
(Concannon) David Barrozino – 40:34	5 – 1
	5 – 2	46:42 – Mark Loeding (Adams, Ford)
(Mahoney, Sandholm) David Barrozino – 57:42	6 – 2

16 min
Penalties
4 min
31
Shots
39

==== Quarterfinals ====
March 24, 1996; 5:30 pm	(1) Colorado College	5–3 (1–0, 1–2, 3–1)	(4) Massachusetts–Lowell	Munn Ice Arena; Attendance: 6,043

Game reference

Ryan Bach
Goalies
Martin Fillion
Referees:
Harry Ammian
John Murphy
Linesman:
Mike Emantian

(Remackel, Hartnell) Scott Swanson – 01:24	1 – 0
	1 – 1	20:15 – PP – Neil Donovan (Sbrocca, Concannon)
	1 – 2	31:11 – Brendan Concannon (Sbrocca)
(Rud) Calvin Elfring – PP – 31:50	2 – 2
(Geronazzo, Cheyne) Colin Schmidt – 40:37	3 – 2
(Hartnell, Needham) Scott Swanson – GW – 41:01	4 – 2
(Cheyne, Geronazzo) Colin Schmidt – 55:11	5 – 2
	5 – 3	56:44 – Neil Donovan (Concannon)

37
Shots
19

March 24, 1996; 2:00 pm	(2) Michigan	4–3 (1–2, 1–0, 2–1)	(3) Minnesota	Munn Ice Arena; Attendance: 6,043

Game reference

Marty Turco
Goalies
Steve DeBus
Referees:
Mike Noeth
Alex Dell
Linesman:
Jack Dunn

	0 – 1	03:38 – SH – Nick Checco (Trebil)
(Morrison, Halko) John Madden – PP – 08:32	1 – 1
	1 – 2	11:56 – PP – Jay Moser (unassisted)
(Madden) Mike Legg – PP – 27:06	2 – 2
(Morrison, Muckalt) Warren Luhning – PP – 47:33	3 – 2
	3 – 3	54:59 - Casey Hankinson (Larson, Zwakman)
(Morrison) Bill Muckalt – GW – 57:59	4 – 3

14 min
Penalties
12 min
20
Shots
22

=== Frozen Four – Cincinnati, Ohio ===
==== National Semifinals ====
March 28, 1996; 2:40 pm	(W1) Colorado College	4–3 (2OT) (0–0, 2–1, 1–2, 0–0, 1–0)	(E2) Vermont	Riverfront Coliseum; Attendance: 11,328

Game reference

Judd Lambert
Goalies
Tim Thomas
Referees:
Frank Cole
Drew Taylor
Linesman:
Bill Jones

(B. Swanson, McNeill) Scott Swanson – 20:26	1 – 0
	1 – 1	31:33 – PP – Martin St. Louis (Perrin, McKell)
(S. Swanson) Jay McNeill – 33:19	2 – 1
	2 – 2	41:02 – Éric Perrin (Ruid, St. Louis)
(Gudmundson) Brian Swanson – 43:09	3 – 2
	3 – 3	54:23 – Phil Eboli (Johnson)
(McNeill) Chad Remackel – GW – 89:31	4 – 3

16 min
Penalties
16 min
46
Shots
35

March 28, 1996; 9:30 pm	(E1) Boston University	0–4 (0–2, 0–1, 0–1)	(W2) Michigan	Riverfront Coliseum; Attendance: 11,521

Game reference

Tom Noble
Goalies
Marty Turco
Referees:
Robin Anderson
John Seidel
Linesman:
John Campion

0 – 1	03:58 – GW PP – Brendan Morrison (Hilton, Botterill)
0 – 2	04:38 – Greg Crozier (Luhning, Sloan)
0 – 3	25:37 – PP – Bill Muckalt (Botterill, Luhning)
0 – 4	44:25 – Greg Crozier (Luhning)

12 min
Penalties
14 min
17
Shots
27

==== National Championship ====
March 30, 1996; 1:00 pm	(W1) Colorado College	2–3 (OT) (0–1, 2–0, 0–1, 0–1)	(W2) Michigan	Riverfront Coliseum; Attendance: 13,330

Game reference
Referees: Frank Cole; Drew Taylor; Linesman: Bill Jones

Scoring summary
Period	Team	Goal	Assist(s)	Time	Score
1st	UM	Bill Muckalt	Morrison	11:33	1–0 UM
2nd	CC	Peter Geronazzo – PP	Schmidt and Rud	23:52	1–1
2nd	CC	Colin Schmidt	Geronazzo and Remackel	25:37	2–1 CC
3rd	UM	Mike Legg – PP	Halko and Schock	46:54	2–2
1st Overtime	UM	Brendan Morrison – GW	Muckalt and Crozier	63:35	3–2 UM
Penalty summary
Period	Team	Player	Penalty	Time	PIM
1st	CC	Bob Needham	Unsportsmanlike conduct	5:39	2:00
1st	UM	John Madden	Unsportsmanlike conduct	5:39	2:00
1st	CC	Darren Clark	Slashing	8:29	2:00
1st	CC	Chad Remackel	Holding	12:05	2:00
1st	UM	Greg Crozier	Holding	12:05	2:00
1st	UM	Blake Sloan	Interference	16:27	2:00
2nd	CC	Eric Rud	Holding the stick	21:01	2:00
2nd	UM	Warren Luhning	Slashing	22:51	2:00
2nd	CC	Jon Austin	Boarding	30:16	2:00
2nd	UM	Warren Luhning	Holding	31:31	2:00
2nd	UM	Warren Luhning	Charging	33:50	2:00
2nd	UM	Chris Frescoln	Holding	36:49	2:00
3rd
3rd	CC	T.J. Tanberg	Tripping	45:32	2:00
3rd	CC	Travis Cheyne	Boarding	47:14	2:00
3rd	UM	Mike Legg	Holding	52:16	2:00
3rd	UM	John Madden	Unsportsmanlike conduct	52:16	2:00
3rd	CC	Peter Geronazzo	Roughing after the whistle	52:16	2:00
3rd	CC	Bob Needham	Unsportsmanlike conduct	52:16	2:00
3rd	UM	Chris Frescoln	High-sticking	58:32	2:00
3rd	CC	Chad Remackel	Roughing	58:32	2:00
1st Overtime	none				

Shots by period
Team	1	2	3	OT	T
Michigan	3	4	10	2	19
Colorado College	5	8	8	1	23

Goaltenders
Team	Name	Saves	Goals against	Time on ice
UM	Marty Turco	21	2	
CC	Ryan Bach	16	3	

== All-Tournament team ==
- G: Marty Turco (Michigan)
- D: Steven Halko (Michigan)
- D: Scott Swanson (Colorado College)
- F: Peter Geronazzo (Colorado College)
- F: Brendan Morrison* (Michigan)
- F: Martin St. Louis (Vermont)

* Most Outstanding Player(s)

== Record by conference ==
Conference	# of Bids	Record	Win %	Regional semifinals	Frozen Four	Championship Game	Champions
CCHA	4	4-3	.571	2	1	1	1
ECAC	3	2-3	.400	2	1	-	-
Hockey East	3	2-3	.400	2	1	-	-
WCHA	2	3-2	.600	2	1	1	-
