= College Hockey Showcase =

The College Hockey Showcase was an annual college Division I men's ice hockey event between four teams that were members of the Big Ten.

The tournament was conceived as a competition between Michigan, Michigan State, Minnesota and Wisconsin partly as a renewal of old WCHA rivalries and partly as a competition between Big Ten schools. The two WCHA teams would play the two CCHA teams once each during the Thanksgiving weekend with all games counting as part of a non-conference schedule. The showcase took place at different locations for the first four years, being held at a neutral venue with one of the schools serving as the host, but moved to the university sites beginning in 1997. The final competitions in 2010 took place at the home sites of Minnesota and Wisconsin.

The tournament operated from 1993 through 2010 with its discontinuation announced shortly after Penn State University declared that they were to sponsor men's and women's ice hockey beginning with the 2012–13 season. With the expectation that the Big Ten would form an ice hockey conference since there were now the requisite 6 teams participating at the Division I level the showcase lost its importance and Wisconsin declined to renew the event for the 2011 season.

Despite being a Big Ten member, Ohio State had never been a rival of either Minnesota or Wisconsin, (having never played in the same conference as either university), and did not participate in the Showcase.

== Yearly results ==
Year	Date	Home team†	Away team†	Venue
1993	November 26	Michigan 6	Minnesota 0	The Palace of Auburn Hills
1993	November 26	Michigan State 4	Wisconsin 2	The Palace of Auburn Hills
1993	November 27	Michigan 3	Wisconsin 5	The Palace of Auburn Hills
1993	November 27	Michigan State 5	Minnesota 6	The Palace of Auburn Hills
1994	November 25	Minnesota 3	Michigan State 2	St. Paul Civic Center
1994	November 25	Wisconsin 2	Michigan 7	St. Paul Civic Center
1994	November 26	Minnesota 4	Michigan 3	St. Paul Civic Center
1994	November 26	Wisconsin 2	Michigan State 3	St. Paul Civic Center
1995	November 24	Minnesota 6*	Michigan State 5	Bradley Center
1995	November 24	Wisconsin 3	Michigan 7	Bradley Center
1995	November 25	Minnesota 3	Michigan 2	Bradley Center
1995	November 25	Wisconsin 4	Michigan State 5	Bradley Center
1996	November 29	Michigan 4*	Minnesota 3	Joe Louis Arena
1996	November 29	Michigan State 3	Wisconsin 1	Joe Louis Arena
1996	November 30	Michigan 8	Wisconsin 4	Joe Louis Arena
1996	November 30	Michigan State 3	Minnesota 5	Joe Louis Arena
1997	November 28	Michigan 4	Minnesota 3	Yost Ice Arena
1997	November 28	Michigan State 2	Wisconsin 0	Munn Ice Arena
1997	November 30	Michigan 2	Wisconsin 1	Yost Ice Arena
1997	November 30	Michigan State 3	Minnesota 2	Munn Ice Arena
1998	November 27	Minnesota 2	Michigan 3	Mariucci Arena
1998	November 27	Wisconsin 1	Michigan State 3	Kohl Center
1998	November 29	Minnesota 2	Michigan State 1	Mariucci Arena
1998	November 29	Wisconsin 1*	Michigan 1	Kohl Center
1999	November 26	Michigan 1	Minnesota 6	Yost Ice Arena
1999	November 26	Michigan State 1	Wisconsin 5	Munn Ice Arena
1999	November 27	Michigan 4	Wisconsin 1	Yost Ice Arena
1999	November 27	Michigan State 6	Minnesota 2	Munn Ice Arena
2000	November 23	Wisconsin 2	Michigan 3	Kohl Center
2000	November 24	Minnesota 2	Michigan State 3	Mariucci Arena
2000	November 25	Minnesota 1	Michigan 4	Mariucci Arena
2000	November 26	Wisconsin 2	Michigan State 6	Kohl Center
2001	November 23	Michigan 2	Minnesota 5	Yost Ice Arena
2001	November 23	Michigan State 2	Wisconsin 1	Munn Ice Arena
2001	November 24	Michigan 5	Wisconsin 3	Yost Ice Arena
2001	November 25	Michigan State 4*	Minnesota 4	Munn Ice Arena

Year	Date	Home team†	Away team†	Venue
2002	November 29	Minnesota 5*	Michigan State 5	Mariucci Arena
2002	November 29	Wisconsin 1	Michigan 4	Kohl Center
2002	November 30	Wisconsin 1	Michigan State 2*	Kohl Center
2002	December 1	Minnesota 1	Michigan 3	Mariucci Arena
2003	November 28	Michigan 1	Wisconsin 3	Yost Ice Arena
2003	November 28	Michigan State 1	Minnesota 5	Munn Ice Arena
2003	November 29	Michigan 2	Minnesota 4	Yost Ice Arena
2003	November 29	Michigan State 1	Wisconsin 2*	Munn Ice Arena
2004	November 26	Minnesota 5	Michigan 1	Mariucci Arena
2004	November 26	Wisconsin 0	Michigan State 4	Kohl Center
2004	November 27	Minnesota 5	Michigan State 0	Mariucci Arena
2004	November 27	Wisconsin 3	Michigan 1	Kohl Center
2005	November 25	Michigan 3	Minnesota 6	Yost Ice Arena
2005	November 25	Michigan State 1	Wisconsin 3	Munn Ice Arena
2005	November 26	Michigan 2	Wisconsin 3	Yost Ice Arena
2005	November 26	Michigan State 2*	Minnesota 2	Munn Ice Arena
2006	November 24	Minnesota 5	Michigan State 4	Mariucci Arena
2006	November 24	Wisconsin 3	Michigan 4	Kohl Center
2006	November 25	Minnesota 8	Michigan 2	Mariucci Arena
2006	November 25	Wisconsin 2	Michigan State 0	Kohl Center
2007	November 23	Michigan 3	Wisconsin 2	Yost Ice Arena
2007	November 23	Michigan State 3*	Minnesota 3	Munn Ice Arena
2007	November 24	Michigan 5	Minnesota 1	Yost Ice Arena
2007	November 24	Michigan State 4*	Wisconsin 4	Munn Ice Arena
2008	November 28	Minnesota 4*	Michigan State 4	Mariucci Arena
2008	November 28	Wisconsin 3	Michigan 0	Kohl Center
2008	November 29	Minnesota 3	Michigan 6	Mariucci Arena
2008	November 29	Wisconsin 3	Michigan State 1	Kohl Center
2009	November 27	Michigan 6	Minnesota 0	Yost Ice Arena
2009	November 27	Michigan State 3	Wisconsin 7	Munn Ice Arena
2009	November 28	Michigan 3	Wisconsin 2	Yost Ice Arena
2009	November 28	Michigan State 1	Minnesota 2	Munn Ice Arena
2010	November 26	Minnesota 2	Michigan State 5	Mariucci Arena
2010	November 26	Wisconsin 4*	Michigan 4	Kohl Center
2010	November 27	Wisconsin 4	Michigan State 1	Kohl Center
2010	November 28	Minnesota 3	Michigan 1	Mariucci Arena

Note: * denotes overtime
Note: † home and away teams only apply to the events from 1997 onwards

== Team Records ==
School	W	L	T	Pct.	GF	GA
Michigan	20	14	2	.583	114	107
Minnesota	18	13	5	.569	126	115
Michigan State	14	16	6	.472	103	109
Wisconsin	12	21	3	.375	90	108
