= Peter Geronazzo =

Canadian ice hockey player

- Born: February 27, 1971 (age 55) Trail, British Columbia, Canada
- Height: 5 ft 11 in (180 cm)
- Weight: 194 lb (88 kg; 13 st 12 lb)
- Position: Center
- Shot: Left
- Played for: HC 24 Milan; Orlando Solar Bears; Pee Dee Pride
- Playing career: 1992–2002

Peter Geronazzo is a Canadian-Italian retired ice hockey center who was an All-American for Colorado College

== Career ==
Geronazzo began playing for Colorado College in the fall of 1992 as a walk-on. He had a rather pedestrian first season as a sophomore during which the Tigers finished dead-last in the WCHA. After a coaching change in the off-season, both the team and Geronazzo greatly improved; CC won the regular season title for the first time in 37 years with Geronazzo more than doubling his point production. As a senior, Geronazzo took a more prominent role in the Tigers' offense, tying for team lead in scoring and winning a second-consecutive WCHA title. Geronazzo continued to improve in his final season, leading the team in goals and points while finishing in the top ten for the nation. Geronazzo helped Colorado College march all the way to the NCAA championship game. He recorded a goal and an assist in the title match but it wasn't enough as CC fell 2–3 in overtime.

After college, Geronazzo travelled to Italy and played for HC 24 Milan. He averaged over a point per game in the playoffs as his team reached the league final. The following season he returned to North America. Outside of a brief stint with the Orlando Solar Bears, he spent the next 5 years with the Pee Dee Pride. He produced solid offensive numbers, helping the team win a regular season title in 1999. Geronazzo professional career came to an unsavory end during the 2002 ECHL playoffs when he was suspended indefinitely following an investigation that revealed he had verbally threatened an official.

In 2014, Geronazzo was inducted into both the Trail Sports Hall of Fame and the Colorado Springs Sports Hall of Fame.

== Statistics ==
=== Regular season and playoffs ===
			Regular Season					Playoffs
Season	Team	League	GP	G	A	Pts	PIM	GP	G	A	Pts	PIM
1989–90	Penticton Knights	BCJHL	18	6	4	10	18	—	—	—	—	—
1989–90	Estevan Bruins	SJHL	37	10	4	14	126	6	1	1	2	16
1990–91	Estevan Bruins	SJHL	20	5	8	13	63	—	—	—	—	—
1992–93	Colorado College	WCHA	24	7	7	14	22	—	—	—	—	—
1993–94	Colorado College	WCHA	36	19	19	38	56	—	—	—	—	—
1994–95	Colorado College	WCHA	43	29	28	57	111	—	—	—	—	—
1995–96	Colorado College	WCHA	42	36	33	69	81	—	—	—	—	—
1996–97	HC 24 Milan	Alpenliga	43	11	19	30	46	—	—	—	—	—
1996–97	HC 24 Milan	Serie A	6	0	1	1	8	10	8	6	14	30
1997–98	Orlando Solar Bears	IHL	3	0	0	0	0	—	—	—	—	—
1997–98	Pee Dee Pride	ECHL	70	25	37	62	63	8	1	3	4	17
1998–99	Pee Dee Pride	ECHL	57	27	25	52	93	13	2	5	7	20
1999–00	Pee Dee Pride	ECHL	70	21	27	48	55	5	3	0	3	4
2000–01	Pee Dee Pride	ECHL	52	21	17	38	44	10	6	4	10	8
2001–02	Pee Dee Pride	ECHL	72	13	26	39	34	9	2	3	5	24
SJHL totals			57	15	12	27	189	6	1	1	2	16
NCAA totals			145	91	87	178	270	—	—	—	—	—
ECHL totals			321	107	132	239	289	36	12	12	24	49

== Awards and honors ==
Award	Year
All-WCHA Second Team	1994–95
WCHA All-Tournament Team	1995
All-WCHA First Team	1995–96
AHCA West First-Team All-American	1995–96
All-NCAA All-Tournament Team	1996
