= Mike Legg =

Canadian ice hockey player

- Born: May 25, 1975 (age 51) London, Ontario, Canada
- Height: 6 ft 0 in (183 cm)
- Weight: 194 lb (88 kg; 13 st 12 lb)
- Position: Right wing
- Shot: Right
- Played for: HIFK; KalPa; San Antonio Iguanas; Fort Wayne Komets; Lubbock Cotton Kings; Idaho Steelheads; Utah Grizzlies
- NHL draft: 273rd overall, 1993; New Jersey Devils
- Playing career: 1997–2003

Mike Legg (born May 25, 1975) is a Canadian former ice hockey player. He is most famous for the Michigan goal, named in honor of one that he scored while playing for the University of Michigan, in a 1996 NCAA Tournament game against the University of Minnesota.

Legg scored his famous goal by picking the puck up onto his stick behind the net and wrapping it around into the top corner of the net. The goal was widely recognized around the hockey world; Legg was awarded "Goal of the Year" by Inside Hockey and the stick he used was donated to the Hockey Hall of Fame. Legg learned about the move from Bill Armstrong.

Although drafted by the New Jersey Devils in 1993, Legg did not play for any NHL team. During his professional career, he played for HIFK and KalPa of the Finnish SM-liiga, as well as the ECHL's San Antonio Iguanas, Fort Wayne Komets, Lubbock Cotton Kings, Idaho Steelheads, and Utah Grizzlies.

Legg works as a firefighter in Burnaby, British Columbia.
