= Munn Ice Arena =

Hockey arena in Michigan, USA

Clarence L. Munn Ice Arena

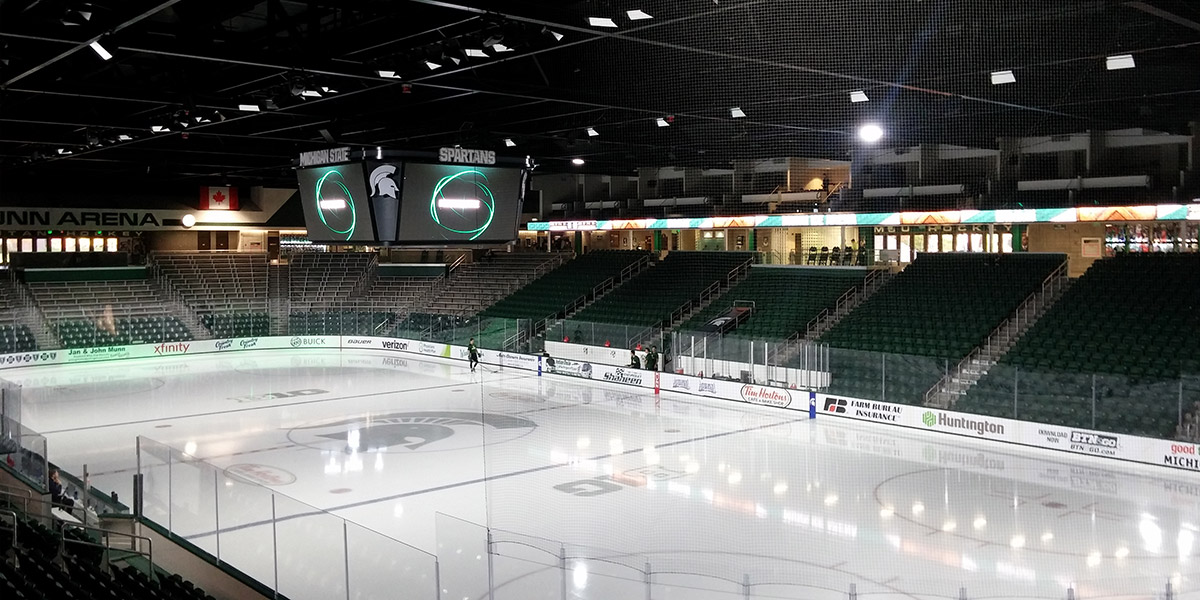
- Interactive map of Clarence L. Munn Ice Arena
- Location: Michigan State University; 509 Birch Rd. East Lansing, Michigan 48824
- Coordinates: 42°43′41″N 84°29′21″W
- Owner: Michigan State University
- Operator: Michigan State University
- Capacity: 6,114 (hockey)
- Surface: 200' x 85' (hockey)

Construction
- Opened: November 1, 1974
- Architect: Daverman Associates

Tenants
- Michigan State Spartans (NCAA Division I); Michigan AlleyCats (NIFHL)

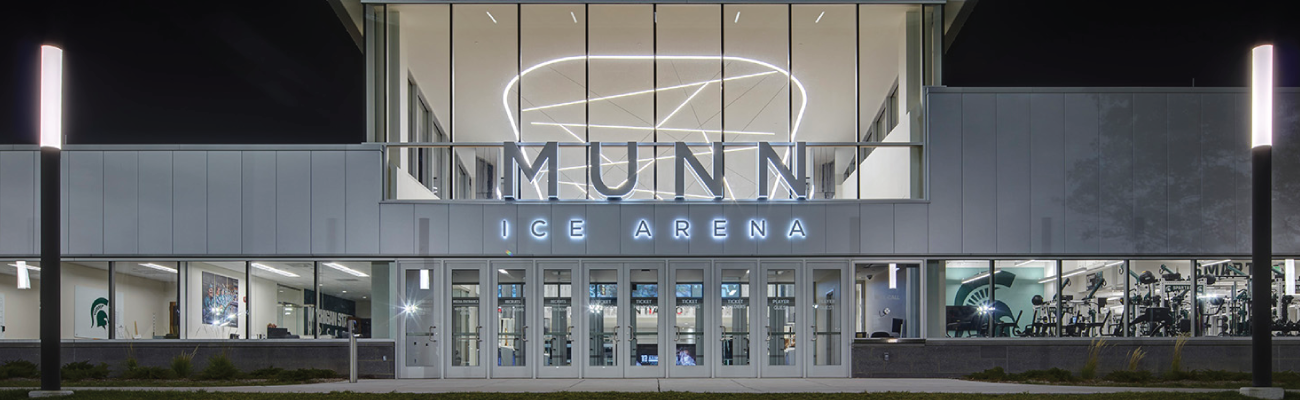
Entrance to the Munn Ice Arena.

Clarence L. Munn Ice Arena is an ice hockey-only arena located in East Lansing, Michigan, on the campus of Michigan State University. It is located across Chestnut Road from the Intramural Recreative Sports Center West and Spartan Stadium. It serves as the home of the Michigan State Spartans men's ice hockey team. Completed in 1974, the arena is named in honor of former football coach and athletic director Clarence "Biggie" Munn. In 2023, the arena's ice rink was named after Ron Mason, who served as the team's head coach from 1979 to 2002, resulting in the adoption of the alternative name, the Ron Mason Rink at Clarence L. Munn Ice Arena.

== History ==
Plans for building a new arena capable of hosting both the university's men's ice hockey and men's basketball teams were made in the early 1970s. Originally conceived as a basketball arena, then-MSU athletic director Burt Smith chose to build a new ice-hockey facility to replace the aging Demonstration Hall. Munn Ice Arena was designed by Daverman Associates of Grand Rapids, Michigan. The original design called for 10,000 seats, but the university was skeptical they could sell that many tickets. Thus, they instead built a 6,470-seat arena.

The MSU ice hockey team moved out of Demonstration Hall following the conclusion of the 1973–74 season and officially opened Munn Ice Arena on 1 November 1974, hosting the Minnesota Golden Gophers in what would end in a 4–3 overtime loss.

As Michigan State grew into a hockey powerhouse in the 1980s, improvements were made to accommodate the program's increasing popularity. In 1985, the heat-exchanger pipes used to create ice were replaced by a direct refrigeration system, allowing for year-round ice. With increasing media coverage, the press box was expanded from one row to two rows, with the ability to accommodate 50 people. A new four-sided scoreboard was added above center ice in 1991. To make handicap-accessible seats, the rink's capacity was reduced to 6,170 in the early 1990s. In 1999–2000, the press box was relocated from center ice to the rink end to make room for 300 club seats on the south end. Luxury boxes were added a year later on the north end of the rink. The additions boosted the capacity to 6,470. During the same time, the four-sided scoreboard was replaced with two boards at the east and west ends of the rink, along with two video replay boards. Recent renovations, which included the installation of additional handicap-accessible platforms, brought the capacity to its current 6,114.

In October 2023, Michigan State officials announced plans to dedicate the rink inside the Munn Ice Arena in honor of former Michigan State hockey coach Ron Mason. The dedication ceremony was held on 7 October prior to the Spartans' season opener against Lake Superior State.

== Sell-out streak ==
Munn Ice Arena was home to the NCAA's longest consecutive regular-season sellout streak. On December 19, 1985, Michigan State produced a sellout crowd versus Northern Michigan University. Michigan State went on to sell out 323 consecutive regular-season home games. The streak ended on Oct. 15, 2004, when Munn failed to fill to capacity for a game against St. Lawrence University.

== Memorable games ==
- November 6, 1974 – vs. North Dakota – The first sell-out crowd in Munn history watches goalie Ron Clark stop a record 30 first-period shots in a 6–2 win over North Dakota.
- March 14, 1976 – vs. Minnesota – Michigan State is upset by Minnesota in triple overtime during the WCHA playoffs. The loss cost the Spartan squad, one of the best to that date, a berth in the NCAA tournament. The game lasted over 86 minutes.
- March 3, 1979 – vs. Michigan – In Amo Bessone's final game as head coach, Michigan State completes a two-game sweep of Michigan with a 5–3 win.
- March 18, 1984 – vs. Boston College – With a 7–6 victory over the Eagles, Michigan State advances to its first NCAA Frozen Four since 1967.
- December 15, 1985 – vs. Ohio State – Senior Mike Donnelly scores a Spartan-record five goals, including the overtime game-winning goal in a 6–5 win over the Buckeyes. Donnelly had tallied a hat trick in the previous night's contest with the Buckeyes.
- February 22, 1986 – vs. Lake Superior State – With three teams (Lake Superior State, Michigan State, and Western Michigan) tied for first place in the CCHA heading into the final two games of the season, Michigan State defeats Lake Superior State 5–4 in a dramatic overtime game on the final night of the season. The victory and a Western Michigan loss gave MSU sole possession of the CCHA title.
- February 12, 1993 – vs. Kent State – A 6–5 win over the Golden Flashes made head coach Ron Mason the winningest coach in NCAA ice hockey history with 674 wins.
- November 2, 1996 – vs. Michigan – Unranked Michigan State upsets defending national champion and No. 1 ranked Michigan 5–4. The loss cost the Wolverines the top spot in the polls for one week — the only week the Wolverines were not ranked No. 1 that season. The victory completed a weekend sweep as MSU recorded an 8–2 win over No. 3 ranked Bowling Green State the previous night.
- February 20, 1998 – vs. Michigan – The Spartans hand the Wolverines a 5–1 loss, giving Ron Mason win No. 800. After the victory, students poured onto the ice celebrating the milestone. The celebration was featured on ESPN's SportsCenter.
- February 28, 1998 – vs. Ferris State – On Senior Night, senior goalie Chad Alban scores an empty-net goal with 13 seconds remaining in a 6–3 win over the Bulldogs.
- February 10, 2001 – vs. Alaska – Sophomore goalie Ryan Miller records his 17th shutout of his career in a 3–0 win over the Nanooks. No. 17 gives Miller the NCAA record for career shutouts. Miller ended his three-year career with 26 shutouts.
- March 1, 2001 – vs. Michigan – An over-capacity crowd of 7,121, the second-largest crowd in Munn history, watches MSU beat archrival UM 3–1 on Senior Night.
- March 9, 2002 – vs. Bowling Green State – In his final game at Munn as head coach, Ron Mason delivers a 4–2 victory over the Falcons to advance to the CCHA Semifinals in Detroit.

== Attendance facts ==
- Munn Ice Arena was home to the NCAA's longest regular-season sell-out streak of 323 games from December 19, 1985, to October 15, 2004.
- There have been a total of 467 sellouts in Munn's 32-year history.
- The largest single season attendance total was 157,567 in 1975–76.
- The largest single season attendance average was 6,722 in 1986–87.
- The largest two-game series crowd was 13,834 on Feb. 11–12, 2000 versus Northern Michigan.

=== Top 10 largest crowds ===
1. – 7,225 – Nov. 10, 2012 – vs. Michigan – W 7–2
2. – 7,121 – March 1, 2001 – vs. Michigan – W 3–1
3. – 7,117 – Jan. 7, 2000 – vs. Michigan – L 2–0
4. – 7,113 – Feb. 15, 2003 – vs. Michigan – W 5–3
5. – 7,099 – Nov 14, 2009 – vs. Michigan – W 2–0
6. – 7,092 – Nov. 3, 2006 – vs. Michigan – W 7–4
7. – 7,072 – Jan. 26, 2008 – vs. Michigan – T 2-2 OT
8. – 6,991 – Feb. 12, 2000 – vs. Northern Michigan – W 2–0
9. – 6,953 – March 4, 2000 – vs. Notre Dame – W 5–3
10. – 6,943 – Feb. 11, 2000 – vs. Northern Michigan – W 3-2 OT
