= Michigan Wolverines men's ice hockey statistical leaders =

The Michigan Wolverines men's ice hockey statistical leaders are individual statistical leaders of the Michigan Wolverines men's ice hockey program in various categories, including goals, assists, points, and saves. Within those areas, the lists identify single-game, single-season, and career leaders. The Wolverines represent the University of Michigan in the NCAA's Big Ten Conference.

Michigan began competing in intercollegiate ice hockey in 1922. These lists are updated through the end of the 2022–23 season.

== Goals ==
Career
Rk	Player	Goals	Seasons
1	Denny Felsner	139	1988–89 1989–90 1990–91 1991–92
2	Neil Celley	119	1945–46 1948–49 1949–50 1950–51
3	Dave Debol	112	1974–75 1975–76 1976–77 1977–78
4	Kris Manery	111	1973–74 1974–75 1975–76 1976–77
5	David Oliver	107	1990–91 1991–92 1992–93 1993–94
6	Bill Muckalt	105	1994–95 1995–96 1996–97 1997–98
7	Jason Botterill	104	1993–94 1994–95 1995–96 1996–97
8	Gil Burford	103	1948–49 1949–50 1950–51
	Mike Knuble	103	1991–92 1992–93 1993–94 1994–95
10	Brendan Morrison	102	1993–94 1994–95 1995–96 1996–97

Season
Rk	Player	Goals	Season
1	Red Berenson	43	1961–62
	Dave Debol	43	1976–77
3	Denny Felsner	42	1991–92
4	Gil Burford	40	1949–50
	Neil Celley	40	1950–51
	Denny Felsner	40	1990–91
7	Angie Moretto	39	1974–75
8	Gary Butler	38	1963–64
	Mike Knuble	38	1994–95
	Kris Manery	38	1976–77
	Kip Maurer	38	1976–77

Single Game
Rk	Player	Goals	Season	Opponent
1	Gib James	10	1935–36	St. Thomas

== Assists ==
Career
Rk	Player	Assists	Seasons
1	Brendan Morrison	182	1993–94 1994–95 1995–96 1996–97
2	Brian Wiseman	164	1990–91 1991–92 1992–93 1993–94
3	David Roberts	157	1989–90 1990–91 1991–92 1992–93
4	T.J. Hensick	147	2003–04 2004–05 2005–06 2006–07
5	Brad Jones	138	1983–84 1984–85 1985–86 1986–87
6	Dave Debol	134	1974–75 1975–76 1976–77 1977–78
7	Mark Ouimet	128	1989–90 1990–91 1991–92 1992–93
8	Denny Felsner	122	1988–89 1989–90 1990–91 1991–92
9	Bill Muckalt	121	1994–95 1995–96 1996–97 1997–98
10	Tim Manning	115	1977–78 1978–79 1979–80 1980–81

Season
Rk	Player	Assists	Season
1	Brendan Morrison	57	1996–97
2	Dave Debol	56	1976–77
3	Brendan Morrison	53	1994–95
4	Denny Felsner	52	1991–92
5	Kevin Hilton	51	1995–96
	Gordon Wilkie	51	1963–64
7	Brian Wiseman	50	1993–94
8	Murray Eaves	49	1979–80
9	J. T. Compher	47	2015–16
10	Brad Jones	46	1986–87
	T.J. Hensick	46	2006–07

Single Game
Rk	Player	Assists	Season	Opponent
1	Vic Heyliger	8	1935–36	St. Thomas

== Points ==
Career
Rk	Player	Points	Seasons
1	Brendan Morrison	284	1993–94 1994–95 1995–96 1996–97
2	Denny Felsner	261	1988–89 1989–90 1990–91 1991–92
3	Brian Wiseman	249	1990–91 1991–92 1992–93 1993–94
4	David Roberts	247	1989–90 1990–91 1991–92 1992–93
5	Dave Debol	246	1974–75 1975–76 1976–77 1977–78
6	Brad Jones	227	1983–84 1984–85 1985–86 1986–87
7	Bill Muckalt	226	1994–95 1995–96 1996–97 1997–98
8	T.J. Hensick	222	2003–04 2004–05 2005–06 2006–07
9	Neil Celley	217	1945–46 1948–49 1949–50 1950–51
10	Gordon McMillan	213	1945–46 1946–47 1947–48 1948–49

Season
Rk	Player	Points	Season
1	Dave Debol	99	1976–77
2	Denny Felsner	94	1991–92
3	Brendan Morrison	88	1996–97
4	Murray Eaves	85	1979–80
5	Neil Celley	79	1950–51
6	Brad Jones	78	1986–87
7	Bruno Baseotto	76	1979–80
	Dan Lerg	76	1979–80
	Kip Maurer	76	1976–77
	Brendan Morrison	76	1994–95

Single Game
Rk	Player	Points	Season	Opponent
1	Gib James	11	1935–36	St. Thomas

== Goals against average ==
Career (min. 40 starts)
Rk	Player	GAA	Seasons
1	Shawn Hunwick	2.06	2007–08 2009–10 2010–11 2011–12
2	Strauss Mann	2.14	2018–19 2019–20 2020–21
3	Bryan Hogan	2.18	2007–08 2008–09 2009–10 2010–11
4	Josh Blackburn	2.29	1998–99 1999–00 2000–01 2001–02
5	Marty Turco	2.32	1994–95 1995–96 1996–97 1997–98
6	Al Montoya	2.36	2002–03 2003–04 2004–05
7	Erik Portillo	2.49	2020–21 2021–22 2022–23
8	Billy Sauer	2.56	2005–06 2006–07 2007–08 2008–09
9	Zach Nagelvoort	2.57	2014–15 2015–16 2016–17
10	Steve Shields	2.73	1990–91 1991–92 1992–93 1993–94

Season (min. 33% minutes)
Rk	Player	GAA	Season
1	Strauss Mann	1.85	2019–20
2	Strauss Mann	1.89	2020–21
3	Billy Sauer	1.95	2007–08
4	Bryan Hogan	1.97	2008–09
5	Shawn Hunwick	1.99	2011–12
6	Erik Portillo	2.14	2021–22
7	Jack Ivankovic	2.150	2025–26
8	Marty Turco	2.1590	1995–96
9	Marty Turco	2.1594	1997–98
10	Zach Nagelvoort	2.20	2013–14

== Save percentage ==
Career (min. 40 starts)
Rk	Player	SV%	Seasons
1	Shawn Hunwick	.928	2007–08 2009–10 2010–11 2011–12
2	Strauss Mann	.926	2018–19 2019–20 2020–21
3	Erik Portillo	.918	2020–21 2021–22 2022–23
4	Zach Nagelvoort	.917	2014–15 2015–16 2016–17
5	Bryan Hogan	.909	2007–08 2008–09 2009–10 2010–11
6	Steve Racine	.9084	2012–13 2013–14 2014–15 2015–16
7	Al Montoya	.90806	2002–03 2003–04 2004–05
8	Bob Gray	.90798	1961–62 1962–63 1963–64
9	Billy Sauer	.90792	2005–06 2006–07 2007–08 2008–09
10	Jake Barczewski	.9067	2023–24

Season (min. 33% minutes)
Rk	Player	SV%	Season
1	Strauss Mann	.939	2019–20
2	Shawn Hunwick	.932	2011–12
3	Strauss Mann	.930	2020–21
4	Zach Nagelvoort	.929	2013–14
5	Erik Portillo	.926	2020–21
6	Shawn Hunwick	.925	2010–11
7	Billy Sauer	.924	2007–08
8	Zach Nagelvoort	.9211	2016–17
9	Jack Ivankovic	.9210	2025–26
10	Al Montoya	.917	2003–04

== Saves ==
Career
Rk	Player	Saves	Seasons
1	Robbie Moore	4,434	1972–73 1973–74 1974–75 1975–76
2	Scott Sharples	3,534	1986–87 1987–88 1988–89 1989–90
3	Josh Blackburn	3,250	1998–99 1999–00 2000–01 2001–02
4	Marty Turco	3,181	1994–95 1995–96 1996–97 1997–98
5	Steve Shields	2,990	1990–91 1991–92 1992–93 1993–94
6	Karl Bagnell	2,938	1969–70 1970–71 1971–72
7	Al Montoya	2,815	2002–03 2003–04 2004–05
8	Billy Sauer	2,761	2005–06 2006–07 2007–08 2008–09
9	Erik Portillo	2,391	2020–21 2021–22 2022–23
10	Steve Racine	2,271	2012–13 2013–14 2014–15 2015–16

Season
Rk	Player	Saves	Season
1	Karl Bagnell	1,305	1971–72
2	Robbie Moore	1,254	1972–73
3	Robbie Moore	1,203	1973–74
4	Rick Palmer	1,191	1976–77
5	Robbie Moore	1,160	1975–76
6	Erik Portillo	1,136	2022–23
7	Paul Fricker	1,122	1979–80
8	Erik Portillo	1,111	2021–22
9	Shawn Hunwick	1,092	2011–12
10	Paul Fricker	1,044	1980–81
