= 1991–92 Michigan Wolverines men's ice hockey season =

CCHA regular season champion 1992 NCAA Division I Men's Ice Hockey Tournament, Frozen Four
- Conference: CCHA
- Home ice: Yost Ice Arena

Record
- Overall: 32–9–3 (22–7–3 CCHA 1st)

Coaches and captains
- Head coach: Red Berenson
- Captain: David Harlock

The 1991–92 Michigan Wolverines men's ice hockey team represented the University of Michigan in intercollegiate college ice hockey during the 1991–92 NCAA Division I men's ice hockey season. The head coach was Red Berenson and the team captain was David Harlock. The team played its home games in the Yost Ice Arena on the University campus in Ann Arbor, Michigan. The team finished first in the Central Collegiate Hockey Association regular season and qualified for the Frozen Four of the 1992 NCAA Division I Men's Ice Hockey Tournament. In the tournament, Michigan was a number one seed in the West Region and defeated Northern Michigan 7–6 in the quarterfinals before losing to Wisconsin 4–2 in the semifinals, but Wisconsin's participation has been vacated.

== Renovations ==
Prior to the season renovations occurred to change Yost's seating capacity from 8100 to 7235. The renovation included a new energy efficient refrigeration unit and rink floor as well as the installation of a desiccant dehumidification system. Other elements of the $US1.2 million (US$2.8 million in 2025 dollars) renovation included arena lighting, sound system, and dasherboards topped with tempered glass as well as renovation of the player, penalty, and scorer's area boxes. Despite the renovations that reduced seating capacity, as of 2011 the January 31 – February 1, 1992, weekend series against eventual national champion Lake Superior State continues to rank as the third highest weekend series attendance (15,240) in team history.

== Honors ==
Denny Felsner earned first team All-CCHA honors as well as Division I All-American recognition by the American Hockey Coaches Association. During the season alumni Todd Brost won a silver medal in Ice hockey at the 1992 Winter Olympics for Canada.

== Statistics and record ==
Denny Felsner's 139 career goals achieved from 1988–1992 stands as the school record, as does his 60 power play goals. Felsner led the CCHA in points (62) and tied for the lead in goals (29) with Dwayne Norris of the Michigan State Spartans men's ice hockey team. Goaltender Steve Shields was second in the CCHA in goals against average (2.90) during a career that would see him total a national record 111 wins by 1994.

== See also ==
- 1992 NCAA Division I Men's Ice Hockey Tournament2
