= Terry Flanagan Memorial Award =

- Sport: Ice hockey
- Awarded for: The player who best demonstrates perseverance, dedication and courage while overcoming severe adversity

History
- First award: 1993
- Final award: 2013
- Most recent: Joe Rogers

The Terry Flanagan Memorial Award was an annual award given out at the conclusion of the Central Collegiate Hockey Association regular season to the player who best demonstrates perseverance, dedication and courage while overcoming severe adversity as voted by the coaches of each CCHA team.

The Award was named after Terry Flanagan who was an assistant coach at Bowling Green for seven seasons before succumbing to cancer in 1991 at the age of 35. Flanagan has another award named in his honor that is given out by the American Hockey Coaches Association to a coach for his career body of work. The first recipient of that award was Terry Flanagan himself in 1997.

The Terry Flanagan Memorial Award was first awarded in 1993 and every year thereafter until 2013 when the CCHA was dissolved as a consequence of the Big Ten forming its men's ice hockey conference.

== Award winners ==
Year	Winner	Position	School
1992–93	Wes McCauley	Defenceman	Michigan State
1993–94	Craig Lisko	Goaltender	Ferris State
1994–95	Chuck Thuss	Goaltender	Miami
1995–96	Jon Gaskins	Defenceman	Michigan State
1996–97	Steve Noble	Center	Notre Dame
1997–98	Bryan Adams	Left wing	Michigan State
1998–99	Ernie Hartlieb	Left wing	Miami
1999–00	Sean Peach	Defenceman	Michigan
2000–01	Doug Schueller	Defenceman	Bowling Green
2001–02	Scott Titus	Defenceman	Ohio State
2002–03	Brian Maloney	Left wing	Michigan State

Year	Winner	Position	School
2003–04	Aaron Voros	Right wing	Alaska-Fairbanks
2004–05	Jordan Sigalet	Goaltender	Bowling Green
2005–06	Steve McJannet	Center	Lake Superior State
2006–07	Tom Fritsche	Left wing	Ohio State
2007–08	Dan VeNard	Defenceman	Notre Dame
2008–09	Erik Condra	Right wing	Notre Dame
2009–10	Aaron Lewicki	Left wing	Ferris State
2010–11	Kevin Petovello	Left wing	Alaska
2011–12	Domenic Monardo	Forward	Lake Superior State
2012–13	Joe Rogers	Goaltender	Notre Dame

=== Winners by school ===
School	Winners
Michigan State	4
Notre Dame	4
Alaska	2
Bowling Green	2
Ferris State	2
Lake Superior State	2
Miami	2
Ohio State	2
Michigan	1

=== Winners by position ===
Position	Winners
Center	2
Right wing	2
Left wing	6
Forward	1
Defenceman	6
Goaltender	4

== See also ==
- CCHA Awards
- Terry Flanagan Award
