= Mel Pearson =

Canadian ice hockey player and coach

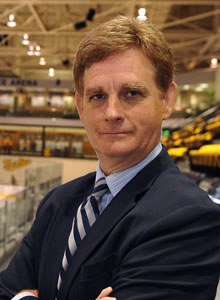
- Pearson in 2011

Biographical details
- Born: February 8, 1959 (age 67); Vancouver, British Columbia, Canada
- Education: Michigan Tech

Playing career
- 1977–1981: Michigan Tech

Coaching career (HC unless noted)
- 1982–1988: Michigan Tech (assistant)
- 1988–1999: Michigan (assistant)
- 1999–2011: Michigan (associate head)
- 2011–2017: Michigan Tech
- 2017–2022: Michigan

Head coaching record
- Overall: 217–157–45 (.572)

Accomplishments and honors

Championships
- As assistant coach: 2x NCAA national champion (1996, 1998); 10x NCAA Frozen Four Appearances (1992, 1993, 1995–1998, 2001–2003, 2008); 9x CCHA tournament champion (1994, 1996, 1997, 1999, 2002, 2003, 2005, 2008, 2010); 10x CCHA regular season champion (1992, 1994–1997, 2000, 2002, 2004, 2005, 2008); 12x GLI Champion (1988–1996, 2007, 2008, 2010); As head coach: NCAA Frozen Four Appearances (2018, 2022); WCHA regular season champion (2016); WCHA tournament champion (2017); Big Ten tournament champion (2022); GLI Champion (2012)

Awards
- Terry Flanagan Award (2000); WCHA Coach of the Year (2012, 2016); College Hockey News Coach of the Year (2015)

Melvin Kim Pearson (born February 8, 1959) is a former college ice hockey player and the former head coach of the Michigan Wolverines men's ice hockey team. Pearson played for Michigan Tech from 1977 to 1981, then served as an assistant coach for the team from 1982 to 1988. Following the 1987–88 season, he spent 23 years as an assistant coach and associate head coach at Michigan under Red Berenson before returning to Michigan Tech as head coach in 2011.

== Early years and playing career ==
(L–R) Rick Boehm, Al Mickalich, Tim Watters and Mel Pearson display the third place trophy after defeating Northern Michigan at the 1981 NCAA Tournament.

Mel Pearson was born in Vancouver on February 8, 1959, the son of Vancouver Canucks player George "Mel" Pearson. His father's playing career ended in 1973 as a member of the Minnesota Fighting Saints, and Mel, who had been playing since the age of six, played hockey in suburban Minneapolis at Edina East High School under coach Willard Ikola. Pearson was recruited to play college hockey by both Michigan and Michigan Tech, and he ultimately chose Michigan Tech after visiting the campus and "[falling] in love with the place". While on his visit, Pearson met with coach John MacInnes, who "made me feel so welcome, and I knew I wanted to play for him right away". Pearson played forward for Michigan Tech from 1977 to 1981 and scored 21 goals among 56 points in 97 games. As a senior, he helped the team advance to the semifinal of the 1981 NCAA Division I men's ice hockey tournament, where the team lost to Minnesota. Michigan Tech won the Great Lakes Invitational tournament four times in Pearson's four years as a player. He scored the tournament-winning goal in triple overtime against Michigan in 1979. Pearson graduated from Michigan Tech in 1981 with a degree in business administration.

== Coaching career ==
=== Michigan Tech (1982–88) ===
In 1982, Michigan Tech promoted assistant coach Jim Nahrgang to head coach following MacInnes's retirement. Nahrgang and assistant coach Herb Boxer, who had both served on MacInnes's coaching staff during Pearson's time as a player, sought out Pearson to fill the other coaching position. "[T]hey were the ones that really got me into coaching. I hadn't really thought about being a coach until they approached me", Pearson said. In addition to his on-ice responsibilities, Pearson recruited players including eventual National Hockey League (NHL) regulars Randy McKay and Damian Rhodes, and Michigan Tech's first Western Collegiate Hockey Association (WCHA) scoring champion, Shawn Harrison. Pearson retained his assistant coach position when Boxer replaced Nahrgang, who resigned in February 1985, as head coach. During Pearson's tenure as assistant coach, Michigan Tech accumulated a record of 97–136–9. The team neither advanced beyond the first round of the WCHA playoffs nor qualified for the NCAA tournament.

=== Michigan (1988–2011) ===
After the 1987–88 season, Pearson accepted the position of assistant coach with the Michigan Wolverines under Red Berenson, who had just completed his fourth season as head coach. Pearson and fellow assistant Larry Pedrie focused heavily on recruiting, describing their typical schedule thusly: "We'd practice, get in the car, go see a game somewhere, play our games on the weekend, then get back in the car to see a prospect play on Sunday night." The coaching staff's recruiting diligence, which continued after Pedrie left and his position was filled by David Shand and then Billy Powers, paid off. Beginning in 1991, the Wolverines qualified for every NCAA Division I Men's Ice Hockey Championship tournament for the remainder of Pearson's tenure. They advanced to the Frozen Four in eleven of those tournaments, and won the national championship in 1996 and 1998. More than fifty of the players Pearson helped recruit to Michigan have gone on to play in the NHL.

In 1996, Pearson was a candidate for the head coaching position at Michigan Tech, but his former teammate Tim Watters was appointed instead. Later that year, Jeff Jackson named Pearson one of his assistant coaches for the US men's national junior ice hockey team that competed in the 1997 World Junior Ice Hockey Championships. The team lost the championship game to Canada, but its second place finish was its best in the event until it won the championship in 2004. Pearson interviewed for and was offered the head coaching position at Miami University in 1999, but he turned down the job that later went to Enrico Blasi. His decision to stay at Michigan was quickly followed by a raise and promotion to associate head coach. "We're doing it to recognize [his] loyalty to the program", Berenson said. The following year Pearson received the Terry Flanagan Award, which recognizes an assistant coach's career body of work, from the American Hockey Coaches Association (AHCA). When asked in 2007 why he had stayed at Michigan for so long, Pearson said, "[Berenson] gives us a lot of responsibility. He lets us be hands-on. And, you have a chance to win every year. I don't have an ego where I need to be a head coach." After Michigan's loss to Minnesota–Duluth in the 2011 National Championship game, however, Michigan Tech pursued Pearson for its vacant head coaching position.

=== Michigan Tech (2011–17) ===
Michigan Tech athletic director Suzanne Sanregret had been given the authority and resources to "go after the best coach" following Jamie Russell's resignation in March 2011, and she interviewed Pearson, Nebraska–Omaha associate coach Mike Hastings and Green Bay (USHL) head coach Eric Rud. Pearson's interview took place four days after the loss to Minnesota–Duluth, and when Sanregret gave him 48 hours to decide whether to accept the position, he ultimately could not say yes. "[W]ith everything going on, it was just a tough time to make ... a life-changing decision", Pearson said. "So I just think I went with the safe way and said no".

Sanregret continued the search after Pearson turned down the job, but she met with Pearson again in early May at the AHCA convention in Naples, Florida, and this time he was ready to accept an offer and become the twenty-first head coach in the Huskies' 91 years of college hockey. Pearson signed a five-year contract and was introduced at the Grant Hockey Educational Center on Michigan Tech's campus on May 10. At the press conference, Pearson posited that what separates him from the previous alumni who have returned to coach the Huskies is his 30 years of experience. "As you're in the game longer you get a bigger network of people who can help you recruit, so I think that's the biggest difference right now", Pearson said. He hired Bill Muckalt, a veteran of five NHL seasons who was coached by Pearson at Michigan, as an assistant coach in June and retained Damon Whitten as the other assistant coach. "Our coaching staff has done a lot of winning and we want to instill the attitude that we're going to win", Whitten said. Pearson spoke of changing the team's style of play to emphasize skill, speed and offensive creativity, and said his staff's efforts would be focused on recruiting for the next few months. He brought in Steve Shields, another former NHL player who played under Pearson at Michigan, as a volunteer goaltending coach in September.

On September 24, 2014, Michigan Tech announced a five-year extension for Pearson, keeping him signed through the 2020–21 season.

=== Michigan (2017–2022) ===
On April 24, 2017, Pearson was announced as the new head coach at the University of Michigan. Under Pearson's watch, the Wolverines reached the Frozen Four in 2018 and 2022.

Pearson's contract expired on May 1, 2022, but he remained the head coach without a new deal until being relieved of his duties on August 5.

== Head coaching record ==
Record table
Season	Team	Overall	Conference	Standing	Postseason
Michigan Tech Huskies (WCHA) (2011–2017)
2011–12	Michigan Tech	16–19–4	11–13–4	8th	WCHA Quarterfinals
2012–13	Michigan Tech	13–20–4	8–16–4	10th	WCHA first round
2013–14	Michigan Tech	14–19–7	12–11–5	5th	WCHA first round
2014–15	Michigan Tech	29–10–2	21–5–2	2nd	NCAA West Regional semifinals
2015–16	Michigan Tech	23–9–5	18–7–3	T–1st	WCHA Semifinals
2016–17	Michigan Tech	23–15–7	15–7–6	2nd	NCAA Midwest Regional semifinals
Michigan Tech:		118–92–29 (.554)	85–59–24 (.577)		
Michigan Wolverines (Big Ten) (2017–2022)
2017–18	Michigan	22–15–3	11–10–3	3rd	NCAA Frozen Four
2018–19	Michigan	13–16–7	9–10–5	T–5th	Big Ten Quarterfinals
2019–20	Michigan	18–14–4	11–10–3	T–2nd	Big Ten Semifinals*
2020–21	Michigan	15–10–1	11–9–0	3rd	NCAA Withdrawal
2021–22	Michigan	31–10–1	16–8–0	2nd	NCAA Frozen Four
Michigan:		99–65–16 (.594)	57–47–10 (.510)		
Total:		217–157–45 (.572)			
National champion Postseason invitational champion Conference regular season champion Conference regular season and conference tournament champion Division regular season champion Division regular season and conference tournament champion Conference tournament champion

== Notes ==
Awards and achievements
Preceded by Dean Blais; Mike Hastings	WCHA Coach of the Year; 2011–12; 2015–16	Succeeded by Mike Hastings; Tom Serratore
