= 1992–93 Michigan Wolverines men's ice hockey season =

1993 NCAA Division I Men's Ice Hockey Tournament, Frozen Four
- Conference: CCHA
- Home ice: Yost Ice Arena

Record
- Overall: 30–7–3 (23–5–2 CCHA 2nd)

Coaches and captains
- Head coach: Red Berenson
- Captain: David Harlock

The 1992–93 Michigan Wolverines men's ice hockey team represented the University of Michigan in intercollegiate college ice hockey during the 1992–93 NCAA Division I men's ice hockey season. The head coach was Red Berenson and the team captain was David Harlock. The team played its home games in the Yost Ice Arena on the university campus in Ann Arbor, Michigan. The team finished second in the Central Collegiate Hockey Association regular season by one point and qualified for the Frozen Four of the 1993 NCAA Division I Men's Ice Hockey Tournament. In the tournament, Michigan was a number two seed in the West Region and defeated Wisconsin 4–3 in overtime in the quarterfinals before losing to Maine by an identical 4–3 overtime score in the semifinals. The team led the CCHA with a power play efficiency of 25.7% (52-202) as well as shorthanded penalty killing percentage of 86.8% (171-197). This was the only Michigan team between 1992 and 1997 that did not win the CCHA regular season championship.

== Honors ==
Pat Neaton and Steve Shields were first team All-CCHA, while David Roberts and David Oliver were second team selections. Shields was a second team All-American selection.

== Statistics and records ==
Goaltender Shields led the CCHA in goals against average (2.19) during a career that would see him total a national record 111 wins by 1994. Mark Ouimet led the CCHA in assists (37). Shields set the school single-season records in wins (30) and goals against average (2.22) that would last until Marty Turco's 1995–96 season. During the season the team began the current school record home game winning streak (17, 1/15/93, broken 1/21/94) and current school record road unbeaten streak (15, 2/13/93, broken 2/25/94). The team's penalty killing percentage of 87.0 (219/253) was a school record that lasted for four years. The February 20, 1993 12–1 win over Bowling Green was the school's 1000th win.

== See also ==
- 1993 NCAA Division I Men's Ice Hockey Tournament
