= 2018–19 Michigan Wolverines men's ice hockey season =

- Conference: Big Ten
- Home ice: Yost Ice Arena

Record
- Overall: 13–16–7
- Home: 7–4–5
- Road: 5–11–0
- Neutral: 1–1–2

Coaches and captains
- Head coach: Mel Pearson
- Captain: Joe Cecconi
- Alternate captain(s): Will Lockwood; Nick Boka; Luke Martin; Jake Slaker

The 2018–19 Michigan Wolverines men's hockey team was the Wolverines' 97th season. They represented the University of Michigan in the 2018–19 NCAA Division I men's ice hockey season. The team was coached by Mel Pearson, in his second year as head coach, and played their home games at Yost Ice Arena.

== Previous season ==
During the 2017–18 ice hockey season Michigan went 22–15–3, including 11–10–3 in Big Ten Play. Michigan lost in the semifinals of the 2018 Big Ten Men's Ice Hockey Tournament to Ohio State by a score of 3 to 2 in overtime. Michigan qualified for the 2018 NCAA Division I Men's Ice Hockey Tournament as the #2 seed in the Northeast Regional. They beat Northeastern by a score of 3-2 in the first round of the tournament. Then they went on to beat Boston University 6 to 3 in the Regional Final. Michigan advanced to the Frozen Four for the first time since 2011, but lost to Notre Dame in the National Semifinals after captain Jake Evans scored the game-winning goal with six seconds remaining.

When the team reached the Frozen Four it marked the sixth time a school had reached the final four of the NCAA Men's Ice Hockey Championship and NCAA Division I men's basketball tournament in the same season: Michigan (1964, 1992*, 1993* and 2018) and Michigan State (1999 and 2001).

== Roster ==
As of September 28, 2018

No.	Nat.	Player	Class	Pos	Height	Weight	DoB	Hometown	Previous team	NHL rights
2		Luke Martin (A)	Junior	D	6' 3" (1.91 m)	215 lb (98 kg)	1998-09-20	St. Louis, Missouri	USNTDP (USHL)	CAR, 52nd overall 2017
5		Griffin Luce	Junior	D	6' 3" (1.91 m)	214 lb (97 kg)	1998-03-10	Williamsville, New York	USNTDP (USHL)	—
6		Jack Summers	Freshman	D	5' 11" (1.8 m)	180 lb (82 kg)	1999-05-18	Livonia, Michigan	Tri-City (USHL)	—
7		Nick Blankenburg	Freshman	D	5' 9" (1.75 m)	160 lb (73 kg)	1998-05-12	Washington, Michigan	Okotoks Oilers (AJHL)	—
8		Jack Becker	Sophomore	F	6' 4" (1.93 m)	205 lb (93 kg)	1997-06-24	Dellwood, Minnesota	Sioux Falls Stampede (USHL)	BOS, 195th overall 2015
10		Will Lockwood (A)	Junior	F	5' 11" (1.8 m)	172 lb (78 kg)	1998-06-20	Bloomfield Hills, Michigan	USNTDP (USHL)	VAN, 64th overall 2016
11		Brendan Warren	Senior	F	6' 1" (1.85 m)	195 lb (88 kg)	1997-05-07	Carleton, Michigan	USNTDP (USHL)	ARI, 81st overall 2015
12		Dakota Raabe	Sophomore	F	5' 9" (1.75 m)	170 lb (77 kg)	1997-05-06	Capistrano Beach, California	Wenatchee Wild (BCHL)	—
13		Jake Slaker (A)	Junior	F	5' 10" (1.78 m)	184 lb (83 kg)	1996-06-28	San Diego, California	Bloomington Thunder (USHL)	—
14		Josh Norris	Sophomore	F	6' 1" (1.85 m)	195 lb (88 kg)	1999-05-05	Oxford, Michigan	USNTDP (USHL)	SJS, 19th overall 2017
18		Adam Winborg	Junior	F	6' 2" (1.88 m)	205 lb (93 kg)	1995-03-31	Stockholm, Sweden	Janesville Jets (NAHL)	—
19		Jack Olmstead	Freshman	F	5' 10" (1.78 m)	165 lb (75 kg)	1998-02-06	Troy, Michigan	Wilkes-Barre/Scranton Knights (NAHL)	—
21		Michael Pastujov	Sophomore	F	6' 0" (1.83 m)	190 lb (86 kg)	1999-08-23	Bradenton, Florida	USNTDP (USHL)	—
23		Jimmy Lambert	Senior	F	6' 0" (1.83 m)	175 lb (79 kg)	2000-06-20	Saskatoon, Canada	Vernon Vipers (BCHL)	—
25		Luke Morgan	Sophomore (RS)	F	5' 11" (1.8 m)	190 lb (86 kg)	1997-08-28	Brighton, Michigan	Cedar Rapids RoughRiders (USHL)	—
27		Nolan Moyle	Freshman	F	6' 2" (1.88 m)	185 lb (84 kg)	1999-04-13	Briarcliff Manor, New York	Green Bay Gamblers (USHL)	—
28		Jack Randl	Freshman	F	5' 10" (1.78 m)	180 lb (82 kg)	2000-05-07	Carpentersville, Illinois	Omaha Lancers (USHL)	—
30		Hayden Lavigne	Junior	G	6' 3" (1.91 m)	200 lb (91 kg)	1996-04-07	Brampton, Ontario	Bloomington Thunder (USHL)	—
31		Strauss Mann	Freshman	G	5' 11" (1.8 m)	180 lb (82 kg)	1998-08-18	Greenwich, Connecticut	Fargo Force (USHL)	—
33		Joseph Cecconi (C)	Senior	D	6' 2" (1.88 m)	205 lb (93 kg)	1997-05-23	Youngstown, New York	Muskegon Lumberjacks (USHL)	DAL, 133rd overall 2015
37		Jack Leavy	Freshman	G	6' 5" (1.96 m)	205 lb (93 kg)	1997-09-19	Birmingham, Michigan	Johnstown Tomahawks (NAHL)	—
43		Quinn Hughes	Sophomore	D	5' 10" (1.78 m)	175 lb (79 kg)	1999-10-14	Orlando, Florida	USNTDP (USHL)	VAN, 7th overall 2018
47		Christian Meike	Junior	D	6' 0" (1.83 m)	172 lb (78 kg)	1996-01-23	Arlington, Virginia	Waterloo Black Hawks (USHL)	—
51		Garrett Van Wyhe	Freshman	F	6' 2" (1.88 m)	200 lb (91 kg)	1997-04-30	Seattle, Washington	Fargo Force (USHL)	—
55		James Gingell	Freshman	D	6' 0" (1.83 m)	205 lb (93 kg)	1997-02-11	Dexter, Michigan	Youngstown Phantoms (USHL)	—
74		Nicholas Boka (A)	Junior	D	6' 1" (1.85 m)	200 lb (91 kg)	1997-09-08	Plymouth, Michigan	USNTDP (USHL)	MIN, 171st overall 2015
91		Nick Pastujov	Junior	F	6' 0" (1.83 m)	200 lb (91 kg)	1998-01-21	Bradenton, Florida	USNTDP (USHL)	NYI, 193rd overall 2016

== Coaching staff ==
Name	Position coached	Seasons at Michigan
Mel Pearson	Head Coach	2nd
Bill Muckalt	Associate head coach	2nd
Brian Wiseman	Assistant Coach	8th
Steve Shields	Volunteer Assistant Coach	3rd
Rick Bancroft	Director of Hockey Operations	1st
Joe Maher	Head Strength and Conditioning Coach	6th

== Standings ==
2018–19 Big Ten Hockey Standings
	Conference record								Overall record					
	GP	W	L	T	3/SW	PTS	GF	GA	GP	W	L	T	GF	GA
#12 Ohio State †	24	13	7	4	3	46	79	52	36	20	11	5	108	83
#10 Notre Dame *	24	11	11	2	2	37	63	65	40	23	14	3	112	91
#20 Minnesota	24	11	10	3	0	36	76	75	38	18	16	4	117	108
#17 Penn State	24	11	12	1	1	35	101	96	39	22	15	2	177	139
Wisconsin	24	9	10	5	2	34	69	81	37	14	18	5	113	130
Michigan	24	9	10	5	2	34	76	75	36	13	16	7	110	114
Michigan State	24	8	12	4	2	30	68	88	36	12	19	5	99	122
Championship: March 23, 2019 † indicates conference regular season champion * indicates conference tournament champion Rankings: USCHO.com Top 20 Poll

== Schedule and results ==
Date	Time	Opponent^{#}	Rank^{#}	Site	Result	Attendance	Record
Regular season
October 6	7:30 PM	Vermont*	#4	Yost Ice Arena • Ann Arbor, MI	L 2–5	5,669	0–1
October 7	4:00 PM	Waterloo*	#4	Yost Ice Arena • Ann Arbor, MI (Exhibition)	W 7–4	4,696	–
October 12	7:30 PM	U.S. NTDP U-18 Team*	#9	Yost Ice Arena • Ann Arbor, MI (Exhibition)	L 3–6	5,439	–
October 19	7:30 PM	#19 Western Michigan*	#11	Yost Ice Arena • Ann Arbor, MI	W 6–5	5,800	1–1
October 20	7:05 PM	at #19 Western Michigan*	#11	Lawson Ice Arena • Kalamazoo, MI	L 4–5	3,426	1–2
October 26	7:30 PM	St. Lawrence*	#12	Yost Ice Arena • Ann Arbor, MI	W 3–0	5,222	2–2
October 27	7:30 PM	St. Lawrence*	#12	Yost Ice Arena • Ann Arbor, MI	W 3–1	5,421	3–2
November 2	7:37 PM	at Lake Superior State*	#12	Taffy Abel Arena • Sault Ste. Marie, MI	L 2–5	3,102	3–3
November 3	7:07 PM	at Lake Superior State*	#12	Taffy Abel Arena • Sault Ste. Marie, MI	W 5–3	3,875	4–3
November 9	7:30 PM	#6 Notre Dame	#14	Yost Ice Arena • Ann Arbor, MI (Rivalry)	W 2–1	5,800	5–3 (1–0)
November 10	7:30 PM	#6 Notre Dame	#14	Yost Ice Arena • Ann Arbor, MI (Rivalry)	L 2–6	5,800	5–4 (1–1)
November 16	7:00 PM	at #5 Penn State	#16	Pegula Ice Arena • State College, PA	W 6–4	5,873	6–4 (2–1)
November 17	7:00 PM	at #5 Penn State	#16	Pegula Ice Arena • State College, PA	L 6–7 ^{OT}	5,810	6–5 (2–2)
November 23	7:30 PM	Wisconsin	#14	Yost Ice Arena • Ann Arbor, MI	T 1–1 ^{(2OT, W)}	5,614	6–5–1 (2–2–1)
November 24	7:30 PM	Wisconsin	#14	Yost Ice Arena • Ann Arbor, MI	T 2–2 ^{(SO, L)}	5,206	6–5–2 (2–2–2)
November 30	7:00 PM	at Michigan State	#14	Munn Ice Arena • East Lansing, MI (Rivalry)	L 3–4	6,406	6–6–2 (2–3–2)
December 1	7:30 PM	Michigan State	#14	Yost Ice Arena • Ann Arbor, MI (Rivalry)	T 1–1 ^{(SO, L)}	5,800	6–6–3 (2–3–3)
December 7	8:00 PM	Minnesota	#15	Yost Ice Arena • Ann Arbor, MI (Rivalry)	T 2–2 ^{(2OT, W)}	5,562	6–6–4 (2–3–4)
December 8	8:00 PM	Minnesota	#15	Yost Ice Arena • Ann Arbor, MI (Rivalry)	L 3–4	5,481	6–7–4 (2–4–4)
December 30	1:00 PM	vs. Michigan Tech*		Little Caesars Arena • Detroit, MI (Great Lakes Invitational)	T 2–2 ^{(SO, L)}	18,339	6–7–5 (2–4–4)
December 31	11:30 AM	vs. Michigan State*		Little Caesars Arena • Detroit, MI (Great Lakes Invitational)	T 2–2 ^{(OT, L)}	7,424	6–7–6 (2–4–4)
January 5	3:30 PM	at #6 Notre Dame		Notre Dame Stadium • Notre Dame, IN (Rivalry)	W 4–2	23,422	7–7–6 (3–4–4)
January 8	7:30 PM	Merrimack*		Yost Ice Arena • Ann Arbor, MI	L 2–4	5,621	7–8–6 (3–4–4)
January 11	7:00 PM	at #4 Ohio State		Value City Arena • Columbus, OH (Rivalry)	W 2–1	10,084	8–8–6 (4–4–4)
January 12	7:00 PM	at #4 Ohio State		Value City Arena • Columbus, OH (Rivalry)	L 2–4	9,857	8–9–6 (4–5–4)
January 24	7:30 PM	#15 Penn State		Yost Ice Arena • Ann Arbor, MI	W 5–1	5,647	9–9–6 (5–5–4)
January 26	7:00 PM	vs. #15 Penn State		Madison Square Garden • New York, NY (B1G Super Saturday)	L 2–5	9,271	9–10–6 (5–6–4)
February 1	8:00 PM	at Minnesota		Mariucci Arena • Minneapolis, MN (Rivalry)	W 4–2	8,238	10–10–6 (6–6–4)
February 2	8:00 PM	at Minnesota		Mariucci Arena • Minneapolis, MN (Rivalry)	L 3–4	9,149	10–11–6 (6–7–4)
February 8	7:30 PM	Michigan State		Yost Ice Arena • Ann Arbor, MI	W 5–3	5,800	11–11–6 (7–7–4)
February 9	7:00 PM	vs. Michigan State		Little Caesars Arena • Detroit, MI (Duel in the D)	W 5–2	15,185	12–11–6 (8–7–4)
February 12	7:00 PM	at #15 Notre Dame		Compton Family Ice Arena • Notre Dame, IN (Rivalry)	L 2–5	3,913	12–12–6 (8–8–4)
February 22	6:30 PM	#6 Ohio State		Yost Ice Arena • Ann Arbor, MI (Rivalry)	W 4–2	5,800	13–12–6 (9–8–4)
February 23	6:00 PM	#6 Ohio State		Yost Ice Arena • Ann Arbor, MI (Rivalry)	T 3–3 ^{(2OT, L)}	5,800	13–12–7 (9–8–5)
March 1	9:00 PM	at Wisconsin		Kohl Center • Madison, WI	L 4–5 ^{OT}	9,459	13–13–7 (9–9–5)
March 2	9:00 PM	at Wisconsin		Kohl Center • Madison, WI	L 3–4 ^{OT}	12,468	13–14–7 (9–10–5)
Big Ten Tournament
March 8	7:00 PM	at Minnesota		Mariucci Arena • Minneapolis, MN	L 2–3 ^{OT}	1,835	13–15–7
March 9	5:00 PM	at Minnesota		Mariucci Arena • Minneapolis, MN	L 1–4	1,911	13–16–7
*Non-conference game. ^{#}Rankings from USCHO.com Poll. All times are in Eastern Time. Source:
