= 1997 in Michigan =

- Decades: 1970s; 1980s; 1990s; 2000s; 2010s
- See also: History of Michigan; Historical outline of Michigan; List of years in Michigan; 1997 in the United States

This article reviews 1997 in Michigan, including the state's office holders, demographics, performance of sports teams, cultural events, a chronology of the state's top news and sports stories, and notable Michigan-related births and deaths.

== Top stories ==
Top news stories in Michigan in 1997 included:

- The January 9 nose-down crash of Comair Flight 3272 in Monroe County on its approach to Detroit Metropolitan Airport, killing all 29 people on board;
- The tornado outbreak of July 1–3, 1997 resulting in 16 deaths, five of them in Grosse Pointe Farms;
- Jack Kevorkian's continued participation in assisted suicides and national publicity (including an HBO special and repeated jokes on late-night television) associated with his actions;
- The trial and conviction of Lapeer native Terry Nichols of conspiring with Timothy McVeigh in connection with the 1995 bombing of the Oklahoma City federal building that killed 168 people;
- The March 12 Detroit bank shooting in which a 21-year-old man opened fire with a 12-gauge pump shotgun in a Detroit bank branch, killing three people and wounding two others;
- The end of the Detroit newspaper strike of 1995–1997;
- The Michigan Gaming Control and Revenue Act becoming effective to legalize casino gambling;
- The death of Coleman Young, Detroit mayor 1974–1994, his body lying in state at the newly built Charles H. Wright Museum of African American History; and
- Astronaut Jerry Linenger, born and raised in East Detroit, spending four months on the Mir space station.

The state's top sports stories included:

- The 1996–97 Detroit Red Wings season winning the 1997 Stanley Cup Final, the team's first Stanley Cup in 42 years;
- The 1997 Michigan Wolverines football team going undefeated and winning a national championship, and Charles Woodson winning the Heisman Trophy.
- Tara Lipinski of Bloomfield Hills, at age 14, winning the ladies singles title at the 1997 World Figure Skating Championships;
- The Colorado Avalanche–Detroit Red Wings brawl, featuring Darren McCarty taking revenge on Claude Lemieux and a total of 18 major penalties for fighting;
- The University of Michigan basketball scandal resulting from the activities of booster Ed Martin and resulting in the firing of head coach Steve Fisher and the NCAA vacating wins from all or part of the previous five seasons;
- The June 13 limousine crash on Woodward Avenue in Birmingham, resulting in brain injury and paralysis of Red Wings defenseman Vladimir Konstantinov; and
- The Detroit Tigers retiring the No. 16 jersey in honor of Baseball Hall of Fame pitcher Hal Newhouser who in 1945 won his second consecutive MVP award and pitching triple crown while leading the Tigers to the World Series championship.

The state's top cultural stories of 1997 included Toni Braxton's Un-Break My Heart winning a Grammy and becoming one of the top-selling singles of all time; the formation of The White Stripes; and Madonna winning a Golden Globe Award as best actress in a musical or comedy for her performance in Evita.

== Office holders ==
=== State office holders ===
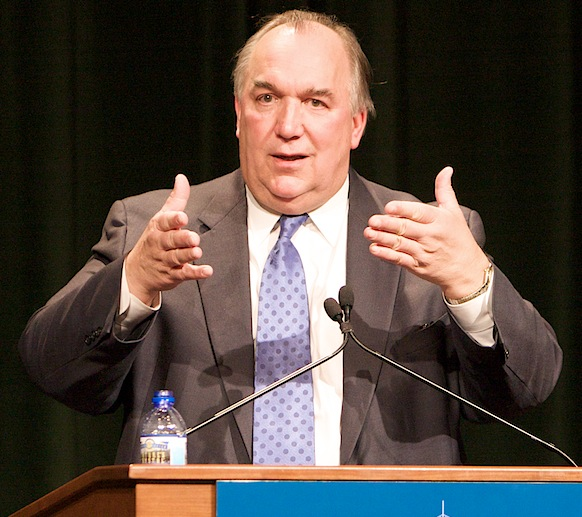
Gov. Engler

- Governor of Michigan: John Engler (Republican)
- Lieutenant Governor of Michigan: Connie Binsfeld (Republican)
- Michigan Attorney General: Frank J. Kelley (Democrat)
- Michigan Secretary of State: Candice Miller (Republican)
- Speaker of the Michigan House of Representatives: Curtis Hertel (Democrat)
- Majority Leader of the Michigan Senate: Dick Posthumus (Republican)
- Chief Justice, Michigan Supreme Court: Conrad L. Mallett Jr.

=== Mayors of major cities ===
- Mayor of Detroit: Dennis Archer
- Mayor of Grand Rapids: John H. Logie
- Mayor of Warren, Michigan: Mark Steenbergh
- Mayor of Flint: Woodrow Stanley
- Mayor of Lansing: David Hollister
- Mayor of Ann Arbor: Ingrid Sheldon (Republican)
- Mayor of Saginaw: Gary L. Loster

=== Federal office holders ===
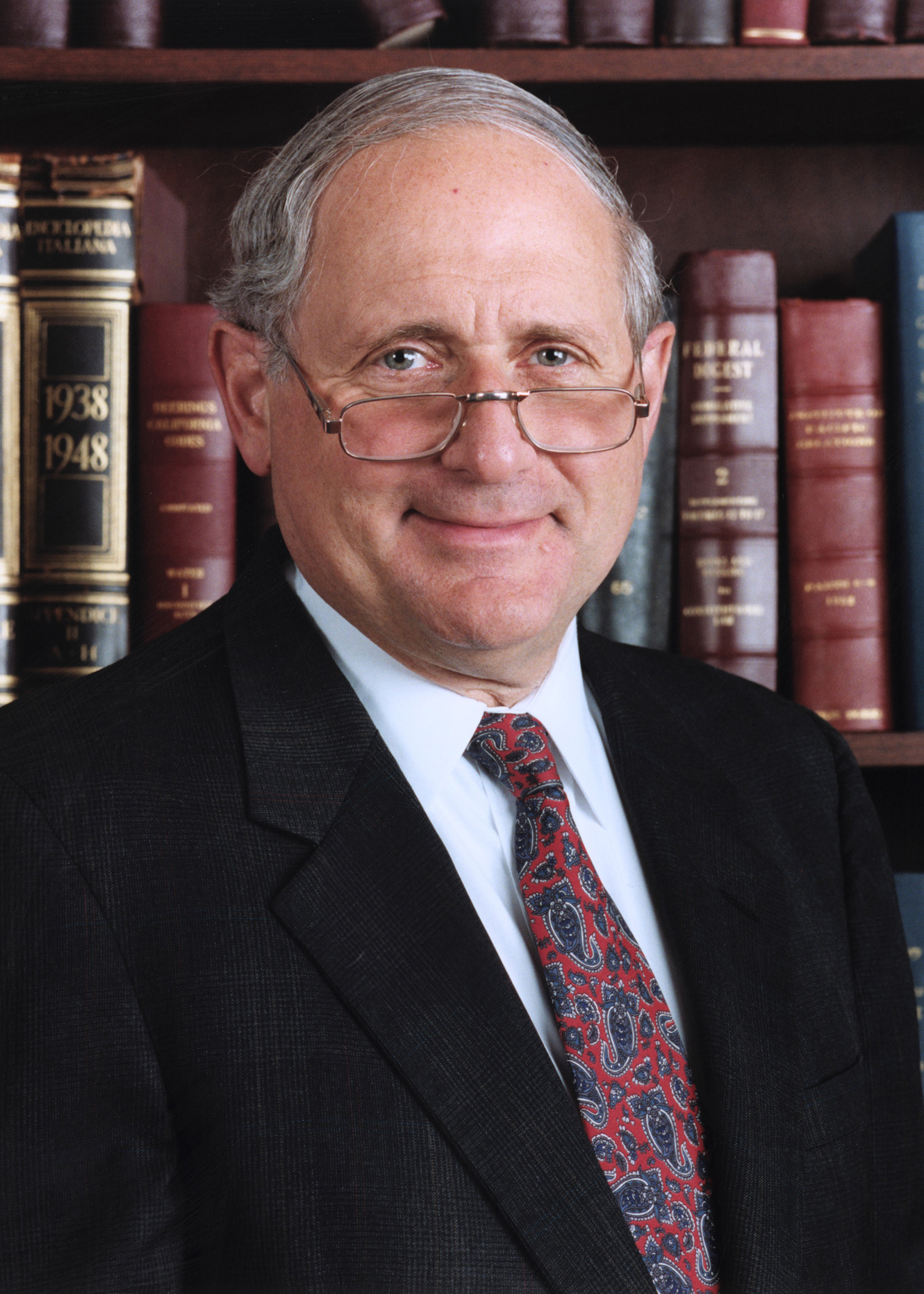
Sen. Levin

- U.S. senator from Michigan: Spencer Abraham (Republican)
- U.S. senator from Michigan: Carl Levin (Democrat)
- House District 1: Bart Stupak (Democrat)
- House District 2: Pete Hoekstra (Republican)
- House District 3: Vern Ehlers (Republican)
- House District 4: Dave Camp (Republican)
- House District 5: James A. Barcia (Democrat)
- House District 6: Fred Upton (Republican)
- House District 7: Nick Smith (Republican)
- House District 8: Debbie Stabenow (Democrat)
- House District 9: Dale Kildee (Democrat)
- House District 10: David Bonior (Democrat)
- House District 11: Joe Knollenberg (Republican)
- House District 12: Sander Levin (Democrat)
- House District 13: Lynn N. Rivers (Democrat)
- House District 14: John Conyers (Democrat)
- House District 15: Carolyn Cheeks Kilpatrick (Democrat)
- House District 16: John Dingell (Democrat)

== Sports ==
=== Baseball ===
- 1997 Detroit Tigers season - Led by manager Buddy Bell, the Tigers compiled a 79–83 record and finished third in the AL East. The individual leaders included Tony Clark (32 home runs, 117 RBIs), Bobby Higginson (.299 batting average), and Justin Thompson (3.02 ERA, 151 strikeouts).

=== American football ===
- 1997 Detroit Lions season - In their first year under head coach Bobby Ross, the Lions compiled a 9–7, finished third in the NFC Central, and lost the wild card playoff game to Tampa Bay. Barry Sanders became the third player in NFL history to rush for at least 2,000 yards in a season and shared the 1997 Associated Press MVP Award with Packers quarterback Brett Favre.
- 1997 Michigan Wolverines football team - In their third season under head coach Lloyd Carr, the Wolverines went 12–0, won the Rose Bowl, and were recognized by the AP, NFF, and FWAA as the national champion. The team's statistical leaders included Brian Griese (2,042 passing yards), Chris Howard (868 rushing yards, 1,131 yards from scrimmage), and tight end Jerame Tuman (404 receiving yards). Charles Woodson won the Heisman Trophy.
- 1997 Michigan State Spartans football team - In their third season under head coach Nick Saban, the Spartans compiled a 7–5 record. Linebacker Ike Reese was selected as the team's MVP. Sedrick Irvin rushed for 1,211 yards.

=== Basketball ===
- 1996–97 Detroit Pistons season - Led By Doug Collins, the Pistons compiled a 54–28 record.
- 1996–97 Michigan Wolverines men's basketball team - The Wolverines won the NIT championship, but it was vacated.
- 1996–97 Michigan State Spartans men's basketball team - In their second season under Tom Izzo, the Spartans compiled a 17–12 record.

=== Ice hockey ===
- 1996–97 Detroit Red Wings season - Led by coach Scotty Bowman, the Red Wings compiled a 38–26–18 record and won the Stanley Cup championship, defeating the Philadelphia Flyers in the finals. The team's statistical leaders included Brendan Shanahan (46 goals, 87 points) and Steve Yzerman (63 assists).
- Colorado Avalanche–Detroit Red Wings brawl - Large-scale on-ice melee at Joe Louis Arena that resulted in 18 fighting major penalties and 144 penalty minutes.
- 1996–97 Michigan Wolverines men's ice hockey season - Led by head coach Red Berenson, the Wolverines compiled a 35–4–4 record, won the CCHA championship and advanced to the Frozen Four.

=== Auto racing ===
- 1997 DeVilbiss 400
- 1997 Miller 400
- 1997 Michigan 500

== Music and culture ==
- Toni Braxton's Un-Break My Heart won Best Female Pop Vocal Performance at the 39th Annual Grammy Awards in 1997. It sold over 10 million copies worldwide, making it one of the best selling singles of all time.
- The White Stripes began their career as part of the Michigan underground garage rock scene.
- Madonna won Best Actress In A Motion Picture, Musical Or Comedy, for her part in Evita, at the 54th annual Golden Globe Awards.
- Disney-owned Hollywood Records dropped Insane Clown Posse from their roster and pulled the album The Great Milenko after only six hours of release, in an attempt to placate the Southern Baptist Church that was threatening to boycott the company for straying from its family-friendly image. The controversy generated tremendous publicity for the band, who then signed with Island Records.
- Vocalist Vinnie Dombroski of Sponge was arrested for allegedly violating a state obscenity law during a R.O.A.R. Tour performance in Tulsa, Oklahoma. The band's single "Have You Seen Mary" was included in the 1997 film Chasing Amy.
- A Fistful of Alice by Alice Cooper was released featuring backup from Slash and Rob Zombie.
- Kid Rock signed with Lava Records.
- Moodymann released his debut album, Silentintroduction.
- The new Charles H. Wright Museum of African American History opened in Detroit.

== Chronology of events ==
=== January ===
- January 9 - Comair Flight 3272 crashed in Monroe County on its approach to Detroit Metropolitan Airport, killing all 29 people on board.

=== March ===
- March 11 - In the 1997 Detroit shootings, Allen Griffin Jr., a troubled 21-year-old, entered a Comerica bank branch and opened fire with a shotgun, killing three people and wounding two others before he was killed by Detroit police.
- March 22 - Tara Lipinski of Bloomfield Hills won the women's singles title at the 1997 World Figure Skating Championships. At age 14, she was the youngest person ever to win the women's championship.
- March 26 - Colorado Avalanche–Detroit Red Wings brawl

=== May ===
- May 24 - Eastpointe's Jerry Linenger landed in Florida after 132 days in space aboard the Mir space station.

=== June ===
- June 13 - A limousine carrying Red Wings stars Vladimir Konstantinov and Slava Fetisov careened off southbound Woodward Avenue in Birmingham, crossing into the median and crashing into a tree. Konstantinov sustained brain injury and paralysis. Fetisov suffered a bruised lung and chest injury. A third passenger, the team masseuse, also sustained critical injuries. The driver, Richard Alan Gnida, had a suspended drivers license and two prior tickets for drinking and driving.

=== July ===
- July 1-3 - The tornado outbreak of July 1–3, 1997 resulted in 16 deaths, five of them in Grosse Pointe Farms.
- July 27 - The Detroit Tigers retired Hal Newhouser's No. 16 jersey during Hal Newhouser Day at Tiger Stadium. Newhouser, at age 76, attended the ceremony.

=== October ===
- October 11 - Steve Fisher was fired after eight years as Michigan's head basketball coach. He was fired for lack of control over the program during the Ed Martin scandal.

=== December ===
- December 23 - Terry Nichols was found guilty by a Denver jury of conspiring with Timothy McVeigh to blow up the Oklahoma City federal building in the 1995 terror attack that killed 168 people.

== Births ==
- August 28 - Bazzi, singer, in Canton
- September 22 - Baby Money, rapper, in Detroit
- October 10 - DDG, rapper, in Pontiac

== Deaths ==
- January 17 - Jug Girard, end and back for Lions (1952–1956), 2x NFL champion, at age 69
- January 27 - Bill Kennedy, actor and longtime host of Bill Kennedy at the Movies, at age 88
- January 27 - Gerald Marks, composer of American music ("All of Me") and Saginaw native, at age 96
- January 31 - Seth Lover, designer of amplifiers and musical instrument electronics and effects, including the Gibson humbucker, at age 87
- March 17 - Charles G. Overberger, chemist, polymer researcher, and professor, at age 76
- April 25 - Pat Paulsen, co-owner of Cherry County Playhouse in Traverse City and later Muskegon, at age 69
- May 9 - Bob Devaney, Michigan native and head football coach Nebraska (1962–1972), at age 82
- May 14 - Harry Blackstone Jr., magician, at age 62
- May 22 - Alfred Hershey, Nobel-winning bacteriologist and geneticist from Owosso and Lansing, at age 88
- May 26 - William T. Cunningham, Catholic priest and co-founder of Focus: HOPE, at age 66
- June 11 - Ralph Kohl, football player at UM (1947-48) and head coach at Eastern Michigan (1952-53), at age 73
- June 20 - Lawrence Payton, tenor, songwriter, vocal arranger, musician, and record producer for the Four Tops, at age 59
- August 17 - Doug Carl, Michigan politician, at age 46
- September 7 - George Crockett Jr., Congressman (1980–1991), at age 88
- September 11 - Mel Groomes, first African-American player signed by Detroit Lions (1948), at age 70
- October 9 - Roy Rappaport, ecological anthropoligist, chair of anthropology at UM, at age 71
- October 30 - Basil W. Brown, Michigan Senate (1957–88), drug conviction later reversed, at age 70
- October 31 - Richard S. M. Emrich, Episcopal bishop of Michigan (1948–73) and civil rights advocate, at age 87
- November 13 - Larry Shinoda, automotive designer (Corvette Stingray, Boss 302 and Boss 429 Mustangs), at age 67
- November 29 - Coleman Young, Mayor of Detroit (1974–1994), at age 79
- December 22 - Flea Clifton, Detroit Tigers infielder (1934–37), at age 89

== See also ==
- 1997 in the United States
