= Terry Flanagan (ice hockey) =

Canadian ice hockey player and coach

- Born: October 17, 1956
- Died: December 29, 1991 (aged 35)
- Played for: New Hampshire Wildcats
- NHL draft: Undrafted
- Playing career: 1975–1979

Terry Flanagan (October 17, 1956 – December 29, 1991) was a Canadian ice hockey player and coach.

Flanagan played four years with the New Hampshire Wildcats men's ice hockey team, and was an assistant coach at Bowling Green State University for seven seasons before succumbing to cancer.

Two major awards are named in Flanagan's honour: The Terry Flanagan Award is presented annually by the American Hockey Coaches Association (AHCA) to honour an assistant coach's career body of work; and the Terry Flanagan Memorial Award was an annual award presented by the now defunct Central Collegiate Hockey Association (CCHA) to the player who best demonstrated perseverance, dedication and courage while overcoming severe adversity as voted by the coaches of each CCHA team.
