= 2020–21 Michigan Wolverines men's ice hockey season =

NCAA Tournament, Regional semifinals
- Conference: Big Ten
- Home ice: Yost Ice Arena

Rankings
- USCHO: #9
- USA Today: #9

Record
- Overall: 15–10–1
- Conference: 11–9–0
- Home: 7–5–1
- Road: 7–4–0
- Neutral: 1–1–0

Coaches and captains
- Head coach: Mel Pearson
- Captain(s): Jack Becker; Strauss Mann
- Alternate captain(s): Nick Blankenburg; Jimmy Lambert

The 2020–21 Michigan Wolverines men's hockey team was the Wolverines' 99th season. They represented the University of Michigan in the 2020–21 NCAA Division I men's ice hockey season. The team was coached by Mel Pearson, in his fourth year as head coach, and played their home games at Yost Ice Arena. The Wolverines received an at-large bid to the 2021 NCAA Tournament, however, they were removed from the tournament due to positive COVID-19 test results within the program.

== Previous season ==
During the 2019–20 ice hockey season, Michigan went 18–14–4, including 11–10–3–2 in Big Ten play in a shortened season that was cancelled due to the COVID-19 pandemic.

== Season ==
As a result of the ongoing COVID-19 pandemic the entire college ice hockey season was delayed. Because the NCAA had previously announced that all winter sports athletes would retain whatever eligibility they possessed through at least the following year, none of North Dakota's players would lose a season of play. However, the NCAA also approved a change in its transfer regulations that would allow players to transfer and play immediately rather than having to sit out a season, as the rules previously required.

== Departures ==
Player	Position	Nationality	Cause
Jacob Hayhurst	Forward	Canada	Graduation (signed with Greenville Swamp Rabbits)
Hayden Lavigne	Goaltender	Canada	Graduation (signed with Birmingham Bulls)
Will Lockwood	Forward	United States	Graduation (signed with Vancouver Canucks)
Griffin Luce	Defenseman	United States	Graduation (signed with Rapid City Rush)
Luke Martin	Defenseman	United States	Graduation (signed with Greenville Swamp Rabbits)
Emil Öhrvall	Forward	Sweden	Transferred to Sacred Heart
Jack Olmstead	Forward	United States	Transferred to Miami
Nick Pastujov	Forward	United States	Graduation (signed with Kansas City Mavericks)
Jake Slaker	Forward	United States	Graduation (signed with Greenville Swamp Rabbits)
Shane Switzer	Defenseman	United States	Graduation (signed with Tulsa Oilers)
Adam Winborg	Forward	Sweden	Graduation (signed with Segeltorps IF)

== Recruiting ==
Player	Position	Nationality	Age	Notes
Matty Beniers	Forward	United States	17	Hingham, MA
Thomas Bordeleau	Forward	United States	18	Houston, TX; Selected 38th overall in 2020
Brendan Brisson	Forward	United States	18	Manhattan Beach, CA; Selected 29th overall in 2020
Josh Groll	Forward	United States	19	San Diego, CA
Steve Holtz	Defenseman	United States	21	White Lake, MI
Kent Johnson	Forward	Canada	17	Port Moody, BC
Philippe Lapointe	Forward	United States	20	Hinsdale, IL
Erik Portillo	Goaltender	Sweden	20	Göteborg, SWE; Selected 67th overall in 2019
Owen Power	Defenseman	Canada	17	Mississauga, ON
Jacob Truscott	Defenseman	United States	18	Fort Gratiot, MI; Selected 144th overall in 2020

== Roster ==
As of September 1, 2020

No.	Nat.	Player	Class	Pos	Height	Weight	DoB	Hometown	Previous team	NHL rights
1		Erik Portillo	Freshman	G	6' 6" (1.98 m)	225 lb (102 kg)	2000-09-03	Gothenburg, Sweden	Dubuque (USHL)	BUF, 67th overall 2019
4		Cam York	Sophomore	D	5' 11" (1.8 m)	174 lb (79 kg)	2001-01-05	Anaheim, California	USNTDP (USHL)	PHI, 14th overall 2019
6		Jack Summers	Junior	D	5' 11" (1.8 m)	180 lb (82 kg)	1999-05-18	Livonia, Michigan	Tri-City (USHL)	—
7		Nick Blankenburg (A)	Junior	F	5' 9" (1.75 m)	160 lb (73 kg)	1998-05-12	Washington, Michigan	Okotoks (AJHL)	—
8		Jack Becker (C)	Senior	F	6' 4" (1.93 m)	205 lb (93 kg)	1997-06-24	Dellwood, Minnesota	Sioux Falls (USHL)	BOS, 195th overall 2015
9		Eric Ciccolini	Sophomore	F	6' 0" (1.83 m)	170 lb (77 kg)	2001-01-04	Vaughan, Ontario	Toronto Jr. Canadiens (OJHL)	NYR, 205th overall 2019
10		Matty Beniers	Freshman	F	6' 1" (1.85 m)	175 lb (79 kg)	2002-11-05	Hingham, Massachusetts	USNTDP (USHL)	—
12		Dakota Raabe	Senior	F	5' 9" (1.75 m)	170 lb (77 kg)	1997-05-06	Capistrano Beach, California	Wenatchee (BCHL)	—
13		Kent Johnson	Freshman	F	6' 1" (1.85 m)	165 lb (75 kg)	2002-10-18	Port Moody, British Columbia	Trail (BCHL)	—
15		Jacob Truscott	Freshman	D	6' 1" (1.85 m)	178 lb (81 kg)	2002-04-12	Port Huron, Michigan	USNTDP (USHL)	VAN, 144th overall 2020
17		Johnny Beecher	Sophomore	F	6' 3" (1.91 m)	209 lb (95 kg)	2001-04-05	Elmira, New York	USNTDP (USHL)	BOS, 31st overall 2019
19		Brendan Brisson	Freshman	F	6' 0" (1.83 m)	185 lb (84 kg)	2001-10-22	Manhattan Beach, California	Chicago (USHL)	VGK, 29th overall 2020
20		Keaton Pehrson	Sophomore	D	6' 2" (1.88 m)	194 lb (88 kg)	1998-12-10	Lakeville, Minnesota	Tri-City (USHL)	—
21		Michael Pastujov	Senior	F	6' 0" (1.83 m)	190 lb (86 kg)	1999-08-23	Bradenton, Florida	USNTDP (USHL)	—
22		Owen Power	Freshman	D	6' 5" (1.96 m)	214 lb (97 kg)	2002-11-22	Mississauga, Ontario	Chicago (USHL)	—
23		Jimmy Lambert (A)	Junior	F	6' 0" (1.83 m)	175 lb (79 kg)	1997-02-09	Saskatoon, Saskatchewan	Vernon (BCHL)	—
24		Steve Holtz	Freshman	D	6' 4" (1.93 m)	190 lb (86 kg)	1999-04-02	White Lake, Michigan	Penticton (BCHL)	—
25		Luke Morgan	Senior	F	5' 11" (1.8 m)	190 lb (86 kg)	1997-08-28	Brighton, Michigan	Lake Superior State (WCHA)	—
26		Philippe Lapointe	Freshman	F	5' 11" (1.8 m)	185 lb (84 kg)	2000-02-29	Novi, Michigan	Trail (BCHL)	—
27		Nolan Moyle	Junior	F	6' 2" (1.88 m)	185 lb (84 kg)	1999-09-13	Briarcliff Manor, New York	Green Bay (USHL)	—
31		Strauss Mann (C)	Junior	G	6' 0" (1.83 m)	175 lb (79 kg)	1998-08-18	Greenwich, Connecticut	Fargo (USHL)	—
34		Thomas Bordeleau	Freshman	F	5' 9" (1.75 m)	179 lb (81 kg)	2002-01-03	Terrebonne, Quebec	USNTDP (USHL)	SJS, 38th overall 2020
37		Jack Leavy	Junior	G	6' 5" (1.96 m)	205 lb (93 kg)	1997-09-19	Birmingham, Michigan	Johnstown (NAHL)	—
51		Garrett Van Wyhe	Junior	F	6' 2" (1.88 m)	200 lb (91 kg)	1997-04-30	Seattle, Washington	Fargo (USHL)	—
52		Josh Groll	Freshman	F	5' 10" (1.78 m)	180 lb (82 kg)	2001-08-09	San Diego, California	Lincoln (USHL)	—
55		Jake Gingell	Junior	D	6' 0" (1.83 m)	205 lb (93 kg)	1997-02-11	Dexter, Michigan	Youngstown (USHL)	—
71		Nick Granowicz	Sophomore	F	6' 1" (1.85 m)	174 lb (79 kg)	1998-03-28	Macomb, Michigan	Merritt (BCHL)	—
90		Jay Keranen	Sophomore	D	5' 11" (1.8 m)	183 lb (83 kg)	1998-05-08	Brighton, Michigan	Prince George (BCHL)	—

== Coaching staff ==
Name	Position coached	Seasons at Michigan
Mel Pearson	Head Coach	4th
Bill Muckalt	Associate head coach	4th
Kris Mayotte	Assistant Coach	2nd
Matt Hunwick	Volunteer Assistant Coach	2nd
Steve Shields	Program Assistant	3rd
Rick Bancroft	Director of Hockey Operations	3rd
Joe Maher	Head Strength and Conditioning Coach	8th

== Standings ==
2020–21 Big Ten ice hockey Standings
	Conference record											Overall record					
	GP	W	L	T	OTW	OTL	3/SW	PTS	PT%	GF	GA	GP	W	L	T	GF	GA
#8 Wisconsin †	24	17	6	1	1	1	0	52	.722	92	52	31	20	10	1	118	80
#7 Minnesota *	22	16	6	0	0	0	0	48	.727	69	44	31	24	7	0	117	64
#9 Michigan	20	11	9	0	1	0	0	32	.550	69	45	26	15	10	1	91	51
#17 Notre Dame	24	12	10	2	1	2	2	41	.542	65	53	29	14	13	2	84	78
Penn State	18	7	11	0	2	1	0	20	.389	48	68	22	10	12	0	65	81
Ohio State	22	6	16	0	0	2	0	20	.273	39	82	27	7	19	1	53	101
Michigan State	22	5	16	1	2	0	0	15	.250	32	70	27	7	18	2	40	77
Championship: March 16, 2021 † indicates conference regular season champion * indicates conference tournament champion Rankings: USCHO.com Top 20 Poll

== Schedule and results ==
Date	Time	Opponent^{#}	Rank^{#}	Site	TV	Decision	Result	Attendance	Record
Regular season
November 14	3:00 PM	#15 Arizona State*	#12	Yost Ice Arena • Ann Arbor, MI	BTN+	Mann	W 8–1	80	1–0
November 15	7:00 PM	#15 Arizona State*	#12	Yost Ice Arena • Ann Arbor, MI	BTN	Mann	W 3–0	72	2–0
November 19	6:00 PM	at #14 Wisconsin	#6	Kohl Center • Madison, WI	FSD	Mann	W 5–2	0	3–0 (1–0)
November 20	6:00 PM	at #14 Wisconsin	#6	Kohl Center • Madison, WI	FSD	Mann	W 2–1 ^{OT}	0	4–0 (2–0)
November 27	7:00 PM	Notre Dame	#4	Yost Ice Arena • Ann Arbor, MI (Rivalry)	BTN+	Mann	L 2–3	0	4–1 (2–1)
November 28	7:00 PM	Notre Dame	#4	Yost Ice Arena • Ann Arbor, MI (Rivalry)	BTN+	Mann	L 1–2	0	4–2 (2–2)
December 2	6:00 PM	at Penn State	#7	Pegula Ice Arena • State College, PA		Mann	W 3–1	153	5–2 (3–2)
December 3	6:00 PM	at Penn State	#7	Pegula Ice Arena • State College, PA	BTN+	Mann	L 5–9	166	5–3 (3–3)
December 8	8:00 PM	#4 Minnesota	#5	Yost Ice Arena • Ann Arbor, MI (Rivalry)	BTN	Mann	L 1–3	0	5–4 (3–4)
December 9	6:30 PM	#4 Minnesota	#5	Yost Ice Arena • Ann Arbor, MI (Rivalry)	BTN	Mann	L 0–4	0	5–5 (3–5)
January 8	7:00 PM	Michigan State	#8	Yost Ice Arena • Ann Arbor, MI (Rivalry)	BTN+	Mann	W 9–0	80	6–5 (4–5)
January 9	4:30 PM	at Michigan State	#8	Munn Ice Arena • East Lansing, MI (Rivalry)		Mann	L 2–3	100	6–6 (4–6)
January 15	7:00 PM	Ohio State	#9	Yost Ice Arena • Ann Arbor, MI (Rivalry)	BTN+	Portillo	W 4–2	69	7–6 (5–6)
January 16	7:00 PM	Ohio State	#9	Yost Ice Arena • Ann Arbor, MI (Rivalry)	BTN	Mann	W 5–0	70	8–6 (6–6)
January 21	6:30 PM	at #16 Notre Dame	#8	Notre Dame Stadium • Notre Dame, IN (Rivalry)		Portillo	W 5–1	136	9–6 (7–6)
January 22	6:30 PM	at #16 Notre Dame	#8	Notre Dame Stadium • Notre Dame, IN (Rivalry)	NBCSN	Mann	W 3–1	138	10–6 (8–6)
February 3	7:00 PM	Penn State	#7	Yost Ice Arena • Ann Arbor, MI					–
February 4	7:00 PM	Penn State	#7	Yost Ice Arena • Ann Arbor, MI					–
February 9	7:00 PM	Michigan State	#8	Yost Ice Arena • Ann Arbor, MI (Rivalry)					–
February 13	2:00 PM	#7 Wisconsin	#8	Yost Ice Arena • Ann Arbor, MI	BTN	Portillo	W 5–1	93	11–6 (9–6)
February 14	5:00 PM	#7 Wisconsin	#8	Yost Ice Arena • Ann Arbor, MI	BTN+	Mann	L 2–3	98	11–7 (9–7)
February 19	5:30 PM	at Ohio State	#7	Value City Arena • Columbus, OH (Rivalry)	BTN+	Portillo	L 2–3	0	11–8 (9–8)
February 20	5:30 PM	at Ohio State	#7	Value City Arena • Columbus, OH (Rivalry)	BTN+	Mann	W 6–0	0	12–8 (10–8)
February 26	7:00 PM	Arizona State	#7	Yost Ice Arena • Ann Arbor, MI	BTN+	Portillo	W 4–1	61	13–8 (10–8)
February 27	7:00 PM	Arizona State	#7	Yost Ice Arena • Ann Arbor, MI	BTN+	Mann	T 1–1	71	13–8–1 (10–8)
March 5	8:00 PM	at #3 Minnesota	#7	3M Arena at Mariucci • Minneapolis, MN (Rivalry)	FSD	Mann	W 5–2	0	14–8–1 (11–8)
March 6	5:00 PM	at #3 Minnesota	#7	3M Arena at Mariucci • Minneapolis, MN (Rivalry)	BTN	Mann	L 2–4	0	14–9–1 (11–9)
March 10	TBA	at Michigan State		Munn Ice Arena • East Lansing, MI (Rivalry)	Cancelled due to the COVID-19 pandemic				
Big Ten Tournament
March 14	8:30 PM	vs. Ohio State	#6	Compton Family Ice Arena • Notre Dame, IN (Quarterfinals)	BTN	Mann	W 4–0	119	15–9–1
March 15	8:30 PM	vs. #4 Minnesota	#7	Compton Family Ice Arena • Notre Dame, IN (Semifinals)	BTN	Mann	L 2–3 ^{OT}	123	15–10–1
NCAA Tournament
March 26	4:00 PM	vs. #9 Minnesota Duluth	#8	Scheels Arena • Fargo, ND (Regional semifinals)	ESPNU	Cancelled due to COVID-19 protocols			
*Non-conference game. ^{#}Rankings from USCHO.com Poll. All times are in Eastern Time. Source:

== Rankings ==
Poll	Week																					
Poll	Pre	1	2	3	4	5	6	7	8	9	10	11	12	13	14	15	16	17	18	19	20	21 (Final)
USCHO.com	12	6	4	7	5	6	7	8	9	9	8	7	7	8	7	7	7	6	7	8	—	9
USA Today	12	6	3	7	5	6	7	8	9	10	9	7	7	8	6	7	7	7	6	8	9	9

USCHO did not release a poll in week 20.

== Awards and honors ==
Player	Award	Ref
Thomas Bordeleau	Tim Taylor Award	
Cameron York	AHCA West First Team All-American	
Cameron York	Big Ten Defensive Player of the Year	
Thomas Bordeleau	Big Ten Freshman of the Year	
Cameron York	Big Ten First Team	
Thomas Bordeleau	Big Ten Second Team	
Strauss Mann	Big Ten Second Team	
Owen Power	Big Ten Second Team	
Matty Beniers	Big Ten Freshman Team	
Thomas Bordeleau	Big Ten Freshman Team	
Kent Johnson	Big Ten Freshman Team	
Owen Power	Big Ten Freshman Team	

== Players drafted into the NHL ==
Michigan had four players selected in the 2020 NHL entry draft. Brendan Brisson was drafted in the first-round, becoming the 25th first-round NHL Draft selection for Michigan, which leads all NCAA teams. Michigan had three players drafted in the 2021 NHL entry draft. Owen Power became the first Wolverine to be drafted first overall.

Year	Round	Pick	Player	NHL team
2021	1	1	Owen Power	Buffalo Sabres
2021	1	2	Matty Beniers	Seattle Kraken
2021	1	5	Kent Johnson	Columbus Blue Jackets
2020	1	29	Brendan Brisson	Vegas Golden Knights
2020	2	38	Thomas Bordeleau	San Jose Sharks
2020	4	120	Ethan Edwards	New Jersey Devils
2020	5	144	Jacob Truscott	Vancouver Canucks
