= 2019 Big Ten men's ice hockey tournament =

- Dates: March 8–23, 2019
- Teams: 7
- Finals site: Compton Family Ice Arena; Notre Dame, Indiana
- Champions: Notre Dame (2nd title)
- Winning coach: Jeff Jackson (2nd title)
- MVP: Cale Morris (Notre Dame)
- Big Ten men's Ice Hockey Tournaments

The 2019 Big Ten Conference Men's Ice Hockey Tournament was the sixth tournament in conference history. It was played between March 8 and March 23, 2019, on-campus locations. By Winning the tournament Notre Dame earned the Big Ten's automatic bid to the 2019 NCAA Division I Men's Ice Hockey Tournament.

== Format ==
The 2019 tournament features a format with all games taking place on the campus of the higher-seeded teams. The tournament opens March 8–10 with three best-of-three quarterfinal series, as the second, third and fourth-seeded teams each hosting a series. The top-seeded team has a bye to the single-elimination semifinals, which is played on March 16. The highest-seeded team remaining after the semifinals hosts the championship game on March 23.

=== Conference standings ===
2018–19 Big Ten Hockey Standings
	Conference record								Overall record					
	GP	W	L	T	3/SW	PTS	GF	GA	GP	W	L	T	GF	GA
#12 Ohio State †	24	13	7	4	3	46	79	52	36	20	11	5	108	83
#10 Notre Dame *	24	11	11	2	2	37	63	65	40	23	14	3	112	91
#20 Minnesota	24	11	10	3	0	36	76	75	38	18	16	4	117	108
#17 Penn State	24	11	12	1	1	35	101	96	39	22	15	2	177	139
Wisconsin	24	9	10	5	2	34	69	81	37	14	18	5	113	130
Michigan	24	9	10	5	2	34	76	75	36	13	16	7	110	114
Michigan State	24	8	12	4	2	30	68	88	36	12	19	5	99	122
Championship: March 23, 2019 † indicates conference regular season champion * indicates conference tournament champion Rankings: USCHO.com Top 20 Poll

== Bracket ==
Teams are reseeded for the semifinals

Quarterfinals; March 8–10
2	Notre Dame	1	2	—
7	Michigan State	0	0	—
3	Minnesota	3*	4	—
6	Michigan	2	1	—
4	Penn State	3	6	4*
5	Wisconsin	4	2	3

Semifinals; March 16/17
1	Ohio State	1
4	Penn State	5
2	Notre Dame	2*
3	Minnesota	1

Championship; March 23
4	Penn State	2
2	Notre Dame	3

Note: * denotes overtime periods.

=== Quarterfinals ===
==== (2) Notre Dame vs. (7) Michigan State ====
March 8	Michigan State	0 – 1	Notre Dame	Compton Family Ice Arena	Recap
		First period	No scoring
No scoring		Second period	No scoring
No scoring		Third period	Mike O'Leary (6) – (Spencer Stastney, Andrew Peeke) – 2:28
John Lethemon (23 saves / 24 shots)		Goalie stats	Cale Morris (27 saves / 27 shots)

March 9	Michigan State	0 – 2	Notre Dame	Compton Family Ice Arena	Recap
		First period	Pierce Crawford (2) – (Jack Jenkins) – 2:01
No scoring		Second period	Graham Slaggert (3) – (Cal Burke) – sh – 10:38
No scoring		Third period	No scoring
John Lethemon (21 saves / 23 shots)		Goalie stats	Cale Morris (28 saves / 28 shots)

Notre Dame won series 2–0

==== (3) Minnesota vs. (6) Michigan ====
March 8	Michigan	2 – 3	OT	Minnesota	3M Arena at Mariucci	Recap
8:28 – Michael Pastujov (9) – (Jake Slaker, Griffin Luce)		First period		No scoring
1:08 – Will Lockwood (16) – (Nick Pastujov, Jack Becker)		Second period		Tyler Sheehy (12) – (Rem Pitlick, Brent Gates) – 4:42
No scoring		Third period		Blake McLaughlin (5) – (Sammy Walker, Sampo Ranta) – 9:06
No scoring		First overtime period		Brannon McManus (14) – (Rem Pitlick, Tommy Novak) – pp – 10:10
Strauss Mann (28 saves / 31 shots)		Goalie stats		Mat Robson (32 saves / 34 shots)

March 9	Michigan	1 – 4	Minnesota	3M Arena at Mariucci	Recap
		First period	Tommy Novak (4) – (Scott Reedy, Tyler Nanne) – 5:25; Scott Reedy (7) – (unassisted) – 12:42; Rem Pitlick (20) – (Tyler Sheehy) – 15:43
No scoring		Second period	Rem Pitlick (20) – (Tyler Sheehy, Brannon McManus) – pp – 17:02
13:39 – Adam Winborg (4) – (Michael Pastujov, Nick Blankenburg)		Third period	No scoring
Strauss Mann (24 saves / 38 shots)		Goalie stats	Mat Robson (22 saves / 23 shots)

Minnesota won series 2–0

==== (4) Penn State vs. (5) Wisconsin ====
March 8	Wisconsin	4 – 3	Penn State	Pegula Ice Arena	Recap
11:07 – Tarek Baker (7) – (unassisted); 17:12 – pp – Sean Dhooghe (13) – (Wyatt Kalynuk, Linus Weissbach)		First period	Alex Limoges (18) – (Liam Folkes, Cole Hults) – 18:20
7:28 – Sean Dhooghe (14) – (Max Zimmer, Tarek Baker)		Second period
18:10 – Sean Dhooghe (15) – (Roman Ahcan, Seamus Malone)		Third period	Paul DeNaples (2) – (Liam Folkes, Evan Barratt) – 3:43; Alex Limoges (19) – (Evan Barratt, Liam Folkes) – pp – 7:48
Daniel Lebedeff (37 saves / 40 shots)		Goalie stats	Peyton Jones (38 saves / 42 shots)

March 9	Wisconsin	2 – 6	Penn State	Pegula Ice Arena	Recap
3:27 – Linus Weissbach (8) – (Jack Gorniak)		First period	Alex Limoges (20) – (Adam Pilewicz, Alex Stevens) – 8:49
No scoring		Second period	Liam Folkes (15) – (Adam Pilewicz, Alex Limoges) – 2:43; Brandon Biro (15) – (Chase Berger) – 8:48; Nate Sucese (17) – (Ludvig Larsson, Paul DeNaples) – 11:40; Evan Bell (1) – (Brandon Biro, Liam Folkes) – pp – 16:06
8:01 – Matthew Freytag (7) – (Seamus Malone)		Third period	Alex Limoges (21) – (Liam Folkes, James Gobetz) – 15:37
Daniel Lebedeff (34 saves / 39 shots); Jack Berry (11 saves / 12 shots)		Goalie stats	Peyton Jones (24 saves / 25 shots)

March 10	Wisconsin	3 – 4	OT	Penn State	Pegula Ice Arena	Recap
5:24 – Brock Caufield (6) – (Wyatt Kalynuk, Dominick Mersch)		First period		Liam Folkes (16) – (Denis Smirnov) – 1:18
9:46 – pp – Max Zimmer (4) – (Sean Dhooghe, Seamus Malone); 10:10 – Josh Ess – (Max Zimmer)		Second period		Cole Hults (5) – (Ludvig Larsson) – pp – 4:09; Alex Limoges (16) – (Liam Folkes, Paul DeNaples) – 18:54
No scoring		Third period		No scoring
No scoring		First overtime period		Liam Folkes (17) – (Alex Limoges, Evan Barratt) – 10:50
Daniel Lebedeff (46 saves/ 50 shots)		Goalie stats		Peyton Jones (36 saves/ 39 shots)

Penn State won series 2–1

=== Semifinals ===
==== (2) Notre Dame vs. (3) Minnesota ====
March 16	Minnesota	1 – 2	OT	Notre Dame	Compton Family Ice Arena	Recap
5:44 – Sampo Ranta (6) – (Ben Brinkman, Sammy Walker)		First period		Cam Morrison (9) – (Mike O'Leary, Michael Graham) – 2:00
No scoring		Second period		No scoring
No scoring		Third period		No scoring
No scoring		First overtime period		Michael Graham (12) – (Andrew Peeke, Mike O'Leary) – pp – 0:53
Mat Robson (35 saves/ 37 shots)		Goalie stats		Cale Morris (25 saves/ 26 shots)

==== (1) Ohio State vs. (4) Penn State ====
March 17	Penn State	5 – 1	Ohio State	Value City Arena	Recap
11:23 – Liam Folkes (18) – (Alex Limoges); 19:59 – Alex Limoges (23) – (Evan Barratt, Evan Bell)		First period	No scoring
14:52 – pp – Brandon Biro (16) – (Kris Myllari, Chase Berger)		Second period	No scoring
2:22 – Nate Sucese (18) – (unassisted); 19:13 – sh, en – Nate Sucese (19) – (Ludvig Larsson, Evan Bell)		Third period	John Wiitala (9) – (Gordi Myer) – 15:38
Peyton Jones (31 saves/ 32 shots)		Goalie stats	Tommy Nappier (31 saves/ 35 shots)

=== Championship ===
==== (2) Notre Dame vs. (4) Penn State ====
March 23	Penn State	2 – 3	Notre Dame	Compton Family Ice Arena	Recap
8:04 – Sam Sternschein (9) – (Nikita Pavlychev, Evan Bell); 16:53 – Alec Marsh (7) – (Brandon Biro, Chase Berger)		First period	Spencer Stastney (1) – (Graham Slaggert) – 3:43; Cal Burke (12) – (Colin Theisen, Andrew Peeke) – 16:19
No scoring		Second period	Cam Morrison (10) – (Mike O'Leary, Bobby Nardella) – 18:24
No scoring		Third period	No scoring
Peyton Jones (26 saves/ 29 shots)		Goalie stats	Cale Morris (46 saves/ 48 shots)

== Tournament awards ==
=== All-Tournament Team ===
- G: Cale Morris* (Notre Dame)
- D: Andrew Peeke (Notre Dame)
- D: Spencer Stastney (Notre Dame)
- F: Cam Morrison (Notre Dame)
- F: Liam Folkes (Penn State)
- F: Alex Limoges (Penn State)

* Most Outstanding Player
