= Mike Gibbons (ice hockey) =

American ice hockey player-coach

Biographical details
- Born: April 9, 1955 (age 71); White Bear Lake, Minnesota, U.S.
- Education: Bemidji State University

Playing career
- 1970–1971: Hill-Murray
- 1974–1975: Austin Mavericks
- 1975–1979: Bemidji State
- 1979–1980: Richmond Rifles
- 1979–1981: Hampton Aces
- Position: Defense

Coaching career (HC unless noted)
- 1981–1982: Bemidji State (assistant)
- 1982–1983: Bemidji State
- 1983–1988: Northern Michigan (assistant)
- 1988–1990: Colorado College (assistant)
- 1990–1994: Denver (assistant)
- 1994–1995: Langley Thunder
- 1995–1997: Baltimore Bandits (assistant)
- 1997–2007: Eastview High School
- 2005–2006: USA National Junior Team (assistant)
- 2007–2020: St. Cloud State (assistant)
- 2021–2023: Bemidji State (assistant)

Head coaching record
- Overall: 30–6–1 (.824) [college] 199–147–15 (.572)

Accomplishments and honors

Championships
- 1979 NAIA National Champion; 2013 WCHA Regular Season Champion; 2014 NCHC Regular Season Champion; 2016 NCHC Tournament Champion; 2018 NCHC Regular Season Champion; 2019 NCHC Regular Season Champion

Awards
- 1979 NAIA All American; 1983 Edward Jeremiah Award; 2016 Terry Flanagan Award (Division I Assistant Coach of the Year)

Mike Gibbons (born April 9, 1955) is an American ice hockey coach. After 40+ years in coaching, Gibbons retired after the 2020 season with the St. Cloud State Huskies men's ice hockey team. Following the COVID-shortened 20–21 season, Gibbons returned to his alma mater as an assistant for the first time in 38 years.

== Career ==
Gibbons is a graduate of Bemidji State University, where he was played for the Beavers men's hockey team from 1975 to 1979. He gained All-America notice in 1978 and 1979 and was a member of the national title-winning team in 1979. He started his coaching career at Bemidji State as an assistant in 1981. Gibbons then served as the BSU head coach during the 1982–83 season, while previous head coach Bob Peters took a year-long sabbatical. During this time he was named the NHCA Conference Coach of the Year and the College Division National Coach of the Year.

Gibbons moved to Northern Michigan University in 1983, and served as an assistant coach with the Wildcats’ hockey program until 1988. He went on to serve as an assistant coach at Colorado College (1988 to 1990) and the University of Denver (1990 to 1994). In 1993, he was a co-coach with Scott Owens for the USA Select Team. After leaving Denver, Gibbons worked for one year as the head coach for the Langley Thunder in the BCJHL.

From 1995 to 1997, Gibbons was an assistant coach with the Baltimore Bandits, the Anaheim Ducks’ American Hockey League affiliate. While at Baltimore, Gibbons coached NHL Stanley Cup winner Matt Cullen. Incidentally, Cullen played collegiate hockey at St. Cloud State, where Gibbons has coached since 2007.

After this time, Gibbons returned to Minnesota to become head coach of the boys' hockey program at Eastview High School, which had opened in the summer of 1997. During ten seasons at Eastview, Gibbons earned Minnesota State High School League Section 5 Coach of the Year honors in 2001, 2003 and 2004.

In 2006, Gibbons served as an assistant coach to Northern Michigan Wildcats men's hockey coach Walt Kyle for the USA Junior National Team, placing fourth at the World Junior Tournament in Vancouver, B.C.

In the summer of 2007, Gibbons was hired as an assistant for the St. Cloud State men's hockey team, where he recruited future NHL players Oliver Lauridson, Ben Hanowski, Nick Jensen, and Nick Dowd, and helped coach St. Cloud to NCAA tournament berths in 2008, 2010, 2012, 2013, 2014, 2015, 2016, 2018, and 2019. While at St. Cloud State, the American Hockey Coaches Association named Gibbons the recipient of the 2016 Terry Flanagan Award, which recognizes career achievement as an assistant hockey coach.

== Personal life ==
Gibbons is a native of White Bear Lake, Minnesota and a graduate of Hill-Murray School. He obtained his Bachelor's degree in Business as well as his Master's degree in Education from Bemidji State University. He and his wife Nancy reside in St. Cloud, Minnesota and have three children, Sean, Kelly, and Shannon. His grandfather, middleweight boxer Mike Gibbons, is regarded as one of the best boxers of all time, while his grandfather's brother Tommy Gibbons was also a renowned heavyweight boxer.

== Awards ==
- 1979 NAIA All American
- 1983 Edward Jeremiah Award (Division III Coach of the Year)
- 2016 Terry Flanagan Award (Division I Assistant Coach of the Year)

== Coaching record ==
=== High School ===
Team	Year	Regular season							Postseason
Team	Year	G	W	L	T	OTL	Pts	Finish	Result
Eastview	1997–1998	22	6	16	0	0	12	4th	Section Quarterfinals
Eastview	1998–1999	23	9	14	0	0	18	5th	Section Quarterfinals
Eastview	1999–2000	25	12	12	1	0	25	2nd	Section Semifinals
Eastview	2000–2001	31	20	10	1	0	41	1st	State Consolation Champions
Eastview	2001–2002	27	22	5	0	0	44	4th	Section Semifinals
Eastview	2002–2003	28	16	8	4	0	36	2nd	Section Finals
Eastview	2003–2004	28	14	12	2	0	30	3rd	Section Finals
Eastview	2004–2005	27	8	17	2	0	18	7th	Section Semifinals
Eastview	2005–2006	27	13	13	1	0	27	4th	Section Semifinals
Eastview	2006–2007	26	11	13	2	0	24	6th	Section Quarterfinals
Totals		264	131	120	13	0	275		

=== Amateur ===
Team	Year	Regular season							Postseason
Team	Year	G	W	L	T	OTL	Pts	Finish	Result
Langley Thunder	1994–1995	60	38	21	1	0	77	2nd in Mainland Conference	BCJHL Quarterfinals
USA U-20 National Team	2005–2006	7	3	3	1	0	7	4th Place	Bronze Medal Game
Totals		67	41	24	2	0	84		

=== Professional ===
Team	Year	Regular season							Postseason
Team	Year	G	W	L	T	OTL	Pts	Finish	Result
Baltimore Bandits	1995–1996	80	33	36	9	2	77	3rd in South	South Division Finals
Baltimore Bandits	1996–1997	80	30	37	10	3	73	4th in Mid-Atlantic	Mid-Atlantic Division Semifinals
Totals		163	64	80	0	19	147		

=== Collegiate ===
Record table
Season	Team	Overall	Conference	Standing	Postseason
Bemidji State Beavers (NHCA) (1982–1983)
1982–83	Bemidji State	30–6–1	16–3–1	1st	NCAA Runner-Up
Bemidji:		30–6–1	16–3–1		
Total:		30–6–1 (.824)			
National champion Postseason invitational champion Conference regular season champion Conference regular season and conference tournament champion Division regular season champion Division regular season and conference tournament champion Conference tournament champion

Awards and achievements
Preceded by Steve Stirling	Edward Jeremiah Award; 1982–83 (with)Peter Van Buskirk	Succeeded by Bob Peters
