= 2010–11 Michigan Wolverines men's ice hockey season =

NCAA West Regional Champion, CCHA regular season champion, Great Lakes Invitational Tournament champion 2011 NCAA Tournament, National Runner-up (Minnesota–Duluth)
- Conference: CCHA
- Home ice: Yost Ice Arena

Rankings
- USA Today/USA Hockey Magazine: 2nd
- USCHO.com/CBS College Sports: 2nd

Record
- Overall: 29-11-4 (20-7-1, CCHA)
- Home: 16-2-1
- Road: 7-6-3
- Neutral: 6-3-0

Coaches and captains
- Head coach: Red Berenson
- Captain(s): Luke Glendening, Carl Hagelin
- Alternate captain(s): Louie Caporusso, Matt Rust

The 2010–11 Michigan Wolverines men's ice hockey team was the Wolverines' 89th season. They represented the University of Michigan in the 2010–11 NCAA Division I men's ice hockey season. The team was coached by Red Berenson and played their home games at Yost Ice Arena, although they took one regular-season home game against archrival Michigan State to Michigan Stadium, drawing the largest crowd in the sport's history. The team earned the 2010–11 Central Collegiate Hockey Association (CCHA) regular season championship and advanced to the Frozen Four of the 2011 NCAA Division I Men's Ice Hockey Tournament. Following the CCHA season, the team announced that they intended to move from the CCHA to the newly formed Big Ten Conference Hockey League in 2013.

== Season ==
The team won the regular season title for the CCHA with a 20-7-1 record. Following the regular season, Senior left wing Carl Hagelin was voted the CCHA's Best Defensive Forward and senior goaltender Shawn Hunwick earned the league's Best Goaltender award. Hagelin was selected as first team All-Conference, while defenceman Jon Merrill was second team All-Conference and All-Rookie. Subsequently, the Big Ten Conference announced that with Penn State's ascension to Division I varsity team status, the conference would recommend that men's hockey become an official conference sport for the 2013–14 NCAA Division I men's ice hockey season with six teams including Michigan.

=== Standings ===
2010–11 Central Collegiate Hockey Association standings
| | Conference | | | | | | | | Overall | | | | | |
| | GP | W | L | T | SW | PTS | GF | GA | GP | W | L | T | GF | GA |
|---|---|---|---|---|---|---|---|---|---|---|---|---|---|---|
| #3 Michigan † | 28 | 20 | 7 | 1 | 0 | 61 | 92 | 57 | 44 | 29 | 11 | 4 | 146 | 98 |
| #4 Notre Dame | 28 | 18 | 7 | 3 | 2 | 59 | 95 | 69 | 44 | 25 | 14 | 5 | 151 | 121 |
| #8 Miami* | 28 | 16 | 7 | 5 | 2 | 55 | 103 | 58 | 39 | 23 | 10 | 6 | 146 | 85 |
| #13 Western Michigan | 28 | 10 | 9 | 9 | 5 | 44 | 77 | 71 | 42 | 19 | 13 | 10 | 116 | 104 |
| Ferris State | 28 | 12 | 12 | 4 | 4 | 43 | 59 | 62 | 39 | 18 | 16 | 5 | 94 | 86 |
| Northern Michigan | 28 | 12 | 13 | 3 | 0 | 39 | 61 | 87 | 39 | 15 | 19 | 5 | 91 | 117 |
| Alaska | 28 | 0^ | 28^ | 0^ | 0^ | 38 | 64 | 66 | 38 | 0^ | 38^ | 0^ | 89 | 91 |
| Lake Superior State | 28 | 8 | 12 | 8 | 5 | 37 | 59 | 78 | 39 | 13 | 17 | 9 | 93 | 115 |
| Ohio State | 28 | 10 | 14 | 4 | 2 | 36 | 66 | 72 | 37 | 15 | 18 | 4 | 95 | 92 |
| Michigan State | 28 | 11 | 15 | 2 | 0 | 35 | 65 | 75 | 38 | 15 | 19 | 4 | 98 | 107 |
| Bowling Green | 28 | 3 | 21 | 4 | 2 | 15 | 41 | 87 | 41 | 10 | 27 | 4 | 74 | 123 |
Championship: Miami † Conference regular season champion * Conference tournament champion Rankings: USCHO.com/CBS College Sports Top 20 Poll^ Alaska was retroactively required to forfeit all wins and loses due to player ineligibilities.

== Postseason ==
Michigan lost in the semifinals of the 2011 CCHA Men's Ice Hockey Tournament to Western Michigan. They won the consolation game against Notre Dame to finish third. As the number two seed in the Western Region of the 16-team 2011 NCAA Division I Men's Ice Hockey Tournament, they defeated number three seeded Nebraska–Omaha in the first round in overtime by a 3–2 margin. The following night Michigan eliminated number four Colorado College 2–1 to advance to the Frozen Four. Prior to the Frozen Four, Hagelin was named to the Inside College Hockey 2010–11 All-America Third Team. Then on April 7, the team defeated North Dakota 2–0 to qualify for the championship game. On April 8, Hegelin was named to the AHCA/Old Time Hockey All-American Ice Hockey Team (second team, west). They lost the national championship game in overtime 3–2.
