= 1996–97 Michigan Wolverines men's ice hockey season =

College sports team

CCHA regular season champion CCHA Tournament champion 1997 NCAA Division I Men's Ice Hockey Tournament, Frozen Four
- Conference: CCHA
- Home ice: Yost Ice Arena

Record
- Overall: 35–4–4 (21–3–3 CCHA 1st)

Coaches and captains
- Head coach: Red Berenson
- Captain: Brendan Morrison
- Alternate captain(s): Jason Botterill & Blake Sloan

The 1996–97 Michigan Wolverines men's ice hockey team represented the University of Michigan in intercollegiate college ice hockey during the 1996–97 NCAA Division I men's ice hockey season. The head coach was Red Berenson and the team captain was Brendan Morrison. The team played its home games in the Yost Ice Arena on the University campus in Ann Arbor, Michigan. The team finished first in the Central Collegiate Hockey Association regular season, won the CCHA Tournament and qualified for the Frozen Four of the 1997 NCAA Division I Men's Ice Hockey Tournament.

The team was led by John Madden, Brendan Morrison, and Marty Turco who were Division I All-Americans selections of the American Hockey Coaches Association. For Morrison it was his third consecutive selection. Morrison earned the same Central Collegiate Hockey Association Player of the Year and The Hockey News U.S. College Player of the Year awards he had won the year before. He also earned the Hobey Baker Award. He was joined on the CCHA All-Conference first team by Turco and Madden, who was selected as the conferences best defensive forward. Madden has gone on to become the only Wolverine to win the Stanley Cup three different times as a player with the 2000 and 2003 New Jersey Devils as well as the 2010 Chicago Blackhawks.

Morrison ended his career as the school recordholder for both single-season (57, 1996–97) and career (182, 1994–97) assists as well as career points (284, 1994–97). The records remain unbroken. Madden established the current NCAA Division I national record for career shorthanded goals (23). Morrison led the nation in points per game (2.02) and assists per game (1.31); Jason Botterill led the nation in power play goals (19); Madden led the nation in short-handed goals (8); and Marty Turco led the nation in goalie winning percentage (.850). The team led the nation in both goals allowed per game and scoring margin per game for the second year in a row. Morrison led the CCHA in goals and points, while Turco led in goals against average. The team led the conference in both power play and penalty killing. The team had the top two and three of the top four conference scorers. Madden tied with Randy Robitaille in conference shorthanded goals.

The team concluded the Central Collegiate Hockey Association regular season as the conference championship with a 21–3–3 record. Their 3 losses were at Michigan State, vs Michigan State in Joe Louis and at Miami, meaning they went undefeated at Yost Ice Arena. In the first round, number one seeded Michigan defeated Alaska in a two-game sweep by scores of 8–1 and 11–0. In the second round, Michigan defeated number five seed Bowling Green 7–2. In the championship game, they defeated number three Michigan State 3–1.

In the 12-team 1997 NCAA Division I Men's Ice Hockey Tournament as the number one seed in the west, after a first round bye the team defeated Minnesota 7–4 before losing in the semifinals to Boston University 3–2.

== See also ==
- 1997 NCAA Division I Men's Ice Hockey Tournament
- List of NCAA Division I Men's Ice Hockey Tournament champions
