= Denny Felsner =

American ice hockey player (born 1970)

- Born: April 29, 1970 (age 55) Warren, Michigan, U.S.
- Height: 6 ft 0 in (183 cm)
- Weight: 195 lb (88 kg; 13 st 13 lb)
- Position: Right wing
- Shot: Left
- Played for: St. Louis Blues; Peoria Rivermen; Chicago Wolves; Milwaukee Admirals; Detroit Vipers; Syracuse Crunch; Chesapeake Icebreakers; Jackson Bandits
- NHL draft: 55th overall, 1989; St. Louis Blues
- Playing career: 1991–2000

Denny Walter Felsner (born April 29, 1970) is an American former professional ice hockey winger.

== Biography ==
Felsner was born in Warren, Michigan. As a youth, he played in the 1982 Quebec International Pee-Wee Hockey Tournament with a minor ice hockey team from Detroit. He is the brother of hockey player, Brian Felsner.

== Playing career ==
He played college hockey for the Michigan Wolverines. After turning professional, he played for the St. Louis Blues in the NHL; the Peoria Rivermen, Chicago Wolves, Milwaukee Admirals, and the Detroit Vipers of the IHL; the Syracuse Crunch of the AHL; and the Chesapeake Icebreakers and Jackson Bandits of the ECHL.

== Career statistics ==
			Regular season					Playoffs
Season	Team	League	GP	G	A	Pts	PIM	GP	G	A	Pts	PIM
1986–87	Detroit Jr. Red Wings	NAHL	37	22	33	55	18	—	—	—	—	—
1987–88	Detroit Jr. Red Wings	NAHL	39	35	43	78	46	—	—	—	—	—
1988–89	University of Michigan	NCAA	39	30	19	49	22	—	—	—	—	—
1989–90	University of Michigan	NCAA	33	27	16	43	24	—	—	—	—	—
1990–91	University of Michigan	NCAA	46	40	35	75	58	—	—	—	—	—
1991–92	University of Michigan	NCAA	44	42	52	94	46	—	—	—	—	—
1991–92	St. Louis Blues	NHL	3	0	1	1	0	1	0	0	0	0
1992–93	Peoria Rivermen	IHL	29	14	21	35	8	—	—	—	—	—
1992–93	St. Louis Blues	NHL	6	0	3	3	2	9	2	3	5	2
1993–94	Peoria Rivermen	IHL	6	8	3	11	14	—	—	—	—	—
1993–94	St. Louis Blues	NHL	6	1	0	1	2	—	—	—	—	—
1994–95	Peoria Rivermen	IHL	25	10	12	22	14	8	2	3	5	0
1994–95	St. Louis Blues	NHL	3	0	0	0	2	—	—	—	—	—
1995–96	Syracuse Crunch	AHL	66	23	34	57	22	14	5	12	17	0
1996–97	Chicago Wolves	IHL	39	10	12	22	4	—	—	—	—	—
1996–97	Milwaukee Admirals	IHL	14	1	3	4	2	—	—	—	—	—
1997–98	Chesapeake Icebreakers	ECHL	50	30	37	67	6	—	—	—	—	—
1997–98	Detroit Vipers	IHL	3	0	0	0	0	—	—	—	—	—
1998–99	Chesapeake Icebreakers	ECHL	50	29	45	74	32	8	4	1	5	2
1999–00	Jackson Bandits	ECHL	28	10	10	20	6	—	—	—	—	—
2000–01	Jackson Bandits	ECHL	70	25	45	70	30	5	2	2	4	4
NHL totals			18	1	4	5	6	10	2	3	5	2
AHL totals			66	23	34	57	22	14	5	12	17	0
ECHL totals			198	94	137	231	74	13	6	3	9	6
IHL totals			116	43	51	94	42	—	—	—	—	—

== Awards and honors ==
Award	Year
All-CCHA Rookie Team	1988–89
All-CCHA First Team	1990–91; 1991–92
AHCA West Second-Team All-American	1990–91
AHCA West First-Team All-American	1991–92

Awards and achievements
Preceded by Scott Beattie	NCAA Ice Hockey Scoring Champion; 1991–92	Succeeded by Paul Kariya
