= 1997 Detroit shootings =

Mass shooting in Detroit, Michigan, United States

- The Comerica bank in the aftermath of the shootings
- Location of the Comerica bank
- Location: 42.428056°N 82.954167°W; Detroit, Michigan, U.S.
- Date: March 11, 1997; 29 years ago c. 10:00 – 10:30 a.m. (EST; UTC−05:00)
- Target: Comerica bank branch
- Attack type: Mass shooting; shootout
- Weapon: 12-gauge pump action shotgun
- Deaths: 4 (including the perpetrator)
- Injuries: 2
- Perpetrator: Allen Lane Griffin Jr.
- Motive: Unknown

On March 11, 1997, a mass shooting took place in Detroit, Michigan, when 21-year-old Allen Lane Griffin Jr. killed three people and wounded two others with a 12-gauge pump shotgun before being fatally shot by police. The shootings took place predominantly at a Comerica branch bank in northeast Detroit. Griffin's motive remains unknown.

== Events ==
=== Initial shooting and car theft ===
The shooting spree began just before 10:00 a.m. when Griffin left his home in Detroit and walked toward Denby High School. He encountered 23-year-old Eric Skalnek, a police recruit applicant, near the entrance to the school's outdoor track. Skalnek had been on a morning jog when he spotted Griffin, dressed in a camouflage jacket, baseball cap, jeans, and tennis shoes. Griffin held a 12-gauge pump action shotgun in one hand and a walking cane in the other. Upon seeing Skalnek, Griffin raised his shotgun and fired, striking Skalnek in the face. Skalnek fell to the ground and lay bleeding until he was found by paramedics. He was taken to hospital and survived. According to a paramedic, a third of Skalnek's face was blown off from the blast.

Griffin fled the scene and stole a Volvo he found in a nearby driveway with the keys in the ignition. He drove several blocks and arrived at a Comerica branch bank.

=== Bank mass shooting ===
Griffin entered the bank screaming incoherently and ordered everyone to get on the floor. Customers and employees later reported being confused about his intentions; some heard him say it was a holdup but others did not. Griffin ordered everyone to recite the Lord's Prayer, instructing the security guard, 38-year-old Virene Brown, to lead them. Griffin alternated between ranting incoherently and reciting the prayer along with the victims. He then pointed his shotgun at Brown's head and said he was going to kill her. However, he became distracted, and Brown fled into the basement.

As people lay on the floor, Griffin walked over to 25-year-old James Isom, an employee of the bank, and fatally shot him in the head. Griffin then entered a back office and killed the bank manager, 52-year-old Stanley Pijanowski III. Griffin returned to the lobby and shot 38-year-old Lisa Griffin (no relation), the assistant bank manager, in her left hand and jaw. A woman along with her 10-year-old daughter and 6-year-old son then fled the bank; Griffin barely reacted.

Griffin then walked out of the bank and was confronted by multiple police officers. As this was taking place, a van parked nearby, and 77-year-old Stanley Hays got out and approached the bank. Police ordered Hays to move away; apparently unaware of the situation, Hays continued towards the bank and was taken hostage by Griffin. The pair headed toward an alley with Hays at gunpoint; Griffin paused and fired at police, missing them, then shoved Hays down and fatally shot him in the head. Police officers then fired 5 or 6 rounds at Griffin, killing him and ending the shooting spree.

Assistant manager Lisa Griffin was credited with saving lives for having activated a silent alarm, alerting police of the situation.

== Victims ==
The victims were identified as:

=== Killed ===
- James Isom, 25, bank employee
- Stanley Pijanowski III, 52, bank manager
- Stanley Hays, 77, bank customer

=== Injured ===
- Eric Skalnek, 23, jogger
- Lisa Griffin, 38, bank employee

== Perpetrator ==
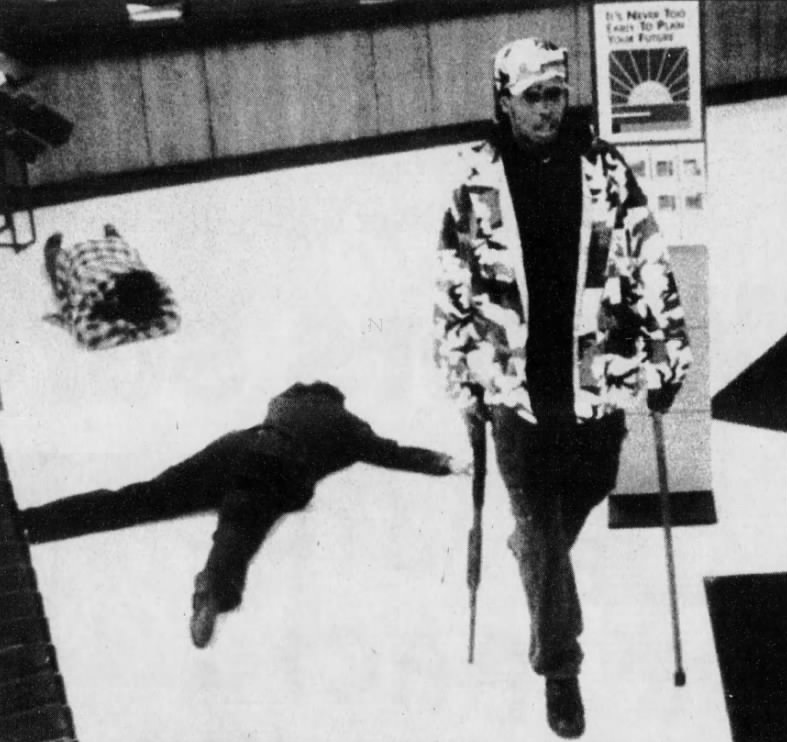
Griffin inside the bank during the shooting.

The perpetrator was identified as 21-year-old Allen Lane Griffin Jr., a car wash employee and father of three children with addresses in Detroit and Ferndale. Griffin was reportedly despondent over a failed marriage; his wife had filed for divorce not long before the shootings. Family members of Griffin also said he had a chronic drug problem. He had been wanted for violating probation and was convicted in 1988 on a burglary charge. He was also convicted in 1993, on charges of carrying a concealed weapon and trying to deliver more than 50 grams of cocaine.

== Aftermath ==
More than a day after the shooting spree, a maintenance worker entered the boiler room in the bank's basement and found Brown still hiding inside. She was taken to St. John Hospital and was listed in good condition by the following day. Brown was not injured during the shooting and was only treated for dehydration and trauma.

The shootings resulted in at least six lawsuits in Wayne County Circuit Court. The lawsuits claimed Comerica and Guardsmark both failed to provide adequate security. Several robberies had occurred in the bank before the shooting, and despite employees addressing concerns about their safety, Comerica failed to take adequate preventative steps to address the issues. The lawyers faulted Brown for failing to lock the bank doors or alert customers when she saw Griffin approaching with a weapon; Brown protested, saying that she did not see him in time to do so.

=== Possible motives ===
Lawyers for the victims claimed the shootings were prompted by an alleged sex-for-money gay relationship between Griffin and Pijanowski, which Pijanowski attempted to terminate shortly before the attack. Griffin and Pijanowski had reportedly met at the Jax Kar Wash in Birmingham, Michigan, where Griffin had been an employee. According to Brown, Pijanowski had been on the phone with Griffin on the morning of the shootings, and victims' lawyers said he should have instructed her to lock the doors. Two acquaintances of Pijanowski claimed he had received threats from Griffin and feared for his safety, but they later recanted their statements, leaving the allegations involving Pijanowski ultimately unproven.

Another possible motive was inspiration by the North Hollywood shootout, a lengthy gun battle between two bank robbers and police officers in Los Angeles only eleven days prior. It was speculated that the Detroit shootings could have been a copycat crime. The Detroit police chief dismissed the speculation, describing the Detroit incident as a random act of violence by a mentally unstable individual, rather than a carefully planned bank robbery. A fatal bank robbery in St. Louis a week after the Detroit shootings was said at the time to have been inspired by both the North Hollywood Shootout and the Detroit shootings.

According to Griffin's family members, Griffin was depressed over his failed marriage and the death of his grandmother in October 1996. He was also behind in his child support payments and had been arrested and jailed for a week in early 1997 for failing to pay child support. Two weeks prior to the shootings, Griffin's wife had prohibited him from seeing his son. According to Griffin's aunt, a therapist would have been unable to help him, and she described him as very suicidal. She said, "He didn't want to kill himself. He wanted somebody else to do it for him." A week prior to the shootings, Griffin had told his mother that he did not have anything worth living for and that he wanted to die.

Despite two years of litigation into the cause of the shootings, no definitive motive was ever determined.

== See also ==
- List of homicides in Michigan
- List of rampage killers in the United States
- 2019 Sebring shooting – a mass shooting in a SunTrust bank
