= Terry Flanagan Award =

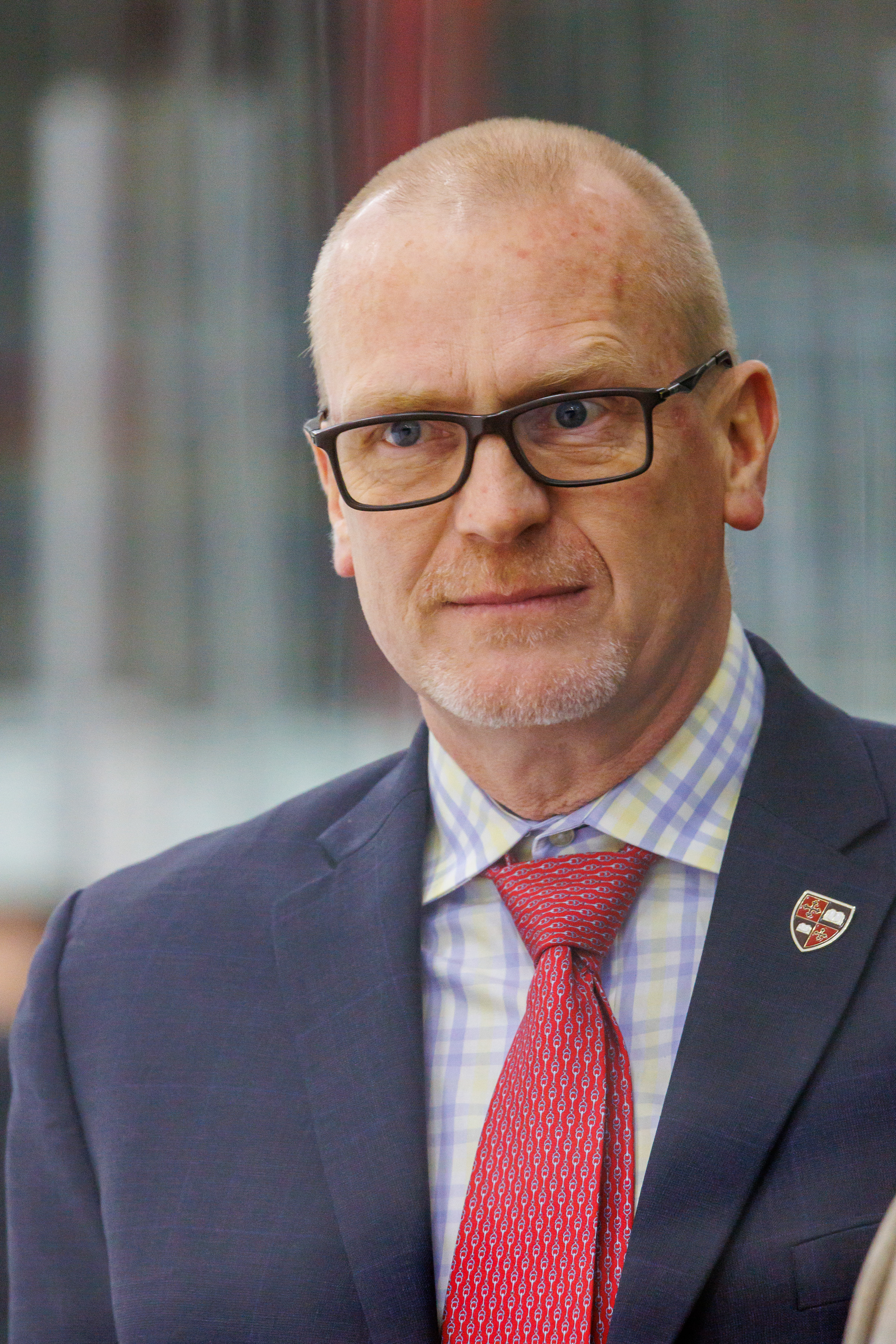
2015 recipient Brent Brekke

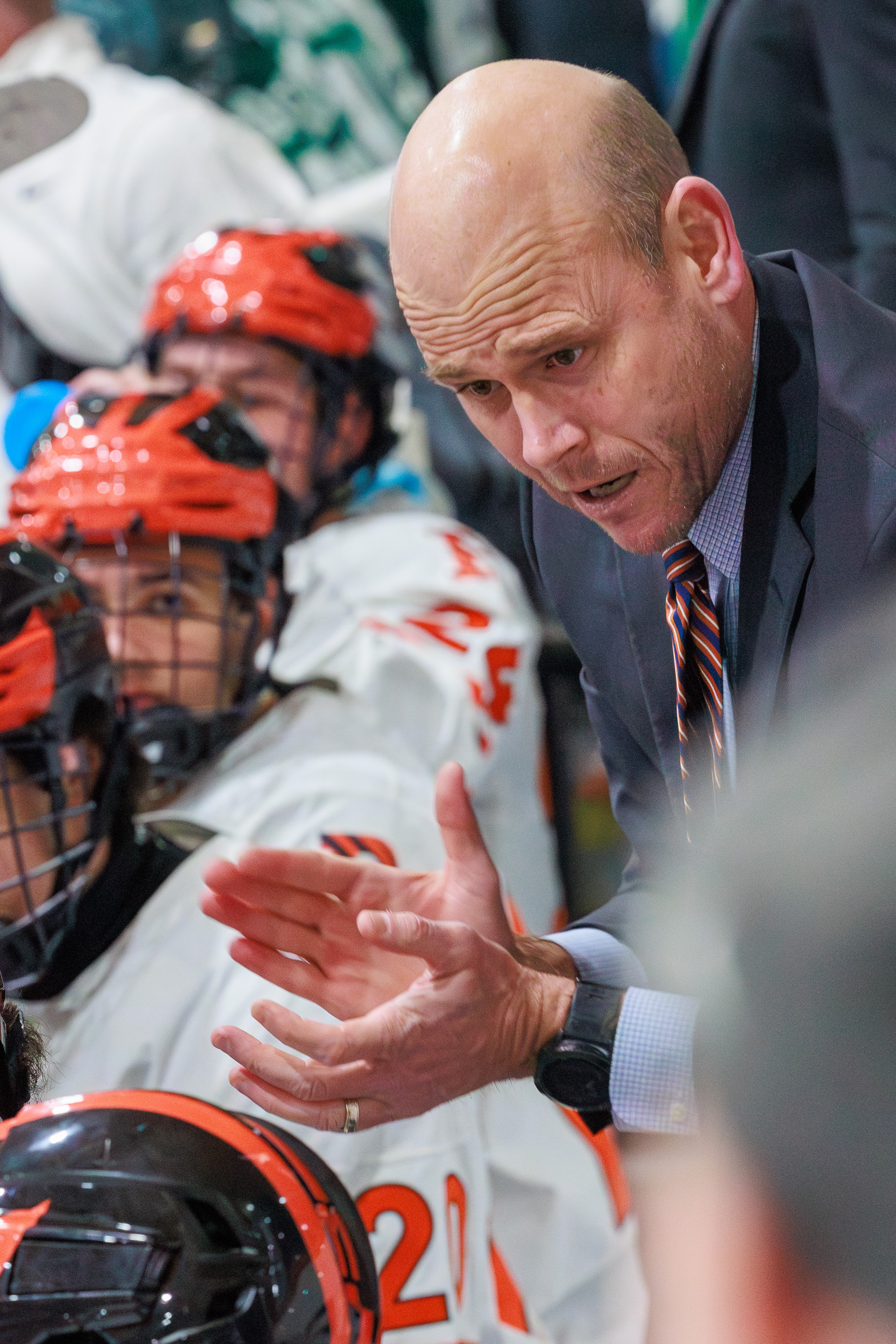
2018 recipient Ben Syer

The Terry Flanagan Award is given each year by the American Hockey Coaches Association (AHCA) to an assistant hockey coach. The award is intended to recognize the coach's entire body of work, not just his performance in one season. The first recipient was Terry Flanagan, an assistant coach at Bowling Green.

The award's recipients:

Year	Recipient	Program(s)
1997	Terry Flanagan	Bowling Green
1998	Bob Saunders	Holy Cross, RPI, UMass–Boston, Northeastern
1999	Glenn Kulyk	Minnesota–Duluth
2000	Mel Pearson	Michigan
2001	Brian Durocher	Boston University
2002	Kevin Houle	SUNY Plattsburgh
2003	Stu Irving	Merrimack
2004	Tom Newton	Western Michigan, Michigan State
2005	Grant Standbrook	Maine
2006	Bill Powers	Michigan
2007	David Lassonde	New Hampshire, Miami (OH), Wisconsin
2008	Dave Peters	Providence, Dartmouth
2009	Steve Miller	Miami, Denver
2010	Andy Slaggert	Notre Dame
2011	Brian Hills	RIT, Bowling Green
2012	Drew Famulak	Ferris State University
2013	Mike Cavanaugh	Boston College
2014	Steve Mattson	Norwich University
2015	Brent Brekke	Miami (OH)
2016	Mike Gibbons	Bemidji State, Northern Michigan, Colorado College, Denver, St. Cloud State
2017	Mike Guentzel	Minnesota, Colorado College, Omaha
2018	Ben Syer	Quinnipiac, Cornell
2019	Kevin Patrick	Union, Bowling Green, Wisconsin, Vermont
2020	Keith Fisher	
2021	Mark Kaufman	
2022	Kris Heeres	
2023	Todd Knott	
2024	Joe Dumais	
2025	Ron Rolston	
2026	Jason Tapp	
