= David Harlock =

Canadian ice hockey player

- Born: March 16, 1971 (age 55) Toronto, Ontario, Canada
- Height: 6 ft 2 in (188 cm)
- Weight: 195 lb (88 kg; 13 st 13 lb)
- Position: Defence
- Shot: Left
- Played for: Toronto Maple Leafs; Washington Capitals; New York Islanders; Atlanta Thrashers
- National team: Canada
- NHL draft: 24th overall, 1990; New Jersey Devils
- Playing career: 1993–2003

David A. Harlock (born March 16, 1971) is a Canadian former professional ice hockey defenceman. He played collegiate hockey with the University of Michigan before being drafted 24th overall by the New Jersey Devils in the 1990 NHL entry draft.

Internationally, Harlock was on the team that represented Canada at the 1994 Winter Olympics.

== Biography ==
Harlock was born in Toronto, Ontario. As a youth, he played in the 1984 Quebec International Pee-Wee Hockey Tournament with the Toronto Red Wings minor ice hockey team.

Before being drafted, Harlock played for the University of Michigan. Selected by the New Jersey Devils in the 1990 NHL entry draft, Harlock played for the Toronto Maple Leafs, Washington Capitals, New York Islanders, and Atlanta Thrashers. He played a total of 212 regular season games, scoring 2 goals and 14 assists for 16 points, collecting 188 penalty minutes. He also competed for Team Canada in the 1994 Winter Olympics.

== Career statistics ==
=== Regular season and playoffs ===
			Regular season					Playoffs
Season	Team	League	GP	G	A	Pts	PIM	GP	G	A	Pts	PIM
1986–87	Toronto Red Wings	GTHL	86	17	55	72	60	—	—	—	—	—
1987–88	Toronto Red Wings	GTHL	70	16	56	72	100	—	—	—	—	—
1987–88	Henry Carr Crusaders	MetJHL	3	0	0	0	4	—	—	—	—	—
1988–89	St. Michael's Buzzers	MetJHL	25	4	16	20	34	27	3	12	15	14
1989–90	University of Michigan	CCHA	42	3	12	15	44	—	—	—	—	—
1990–91	University of Michigan	CCHA	39	2	8	10	70	—	—	—	—	—
1991–92	University of Michigan	CCHA	44	1	6	7	80	—	—	—	—	—
1992–93	University of Michigan	CCHA	38	3	9	12	58	—	—	—	—	—
1992–93	Canada	Intl	4	0	0	0	2	—	—	—	—	—
1993–94	Canada	Intl	41	0	3	3	28	—	—	—	—	—
1993–94	Toronto Maple Leafs	NHL	6	0	0	0	0	—	—	—	—	—
1993–94	St. John's Maple Leafs	AHL	10	0	3	3	2	9	0	0	0	6
1994–95	St. John's Maple Leafs	AHL	58	0	6	6	44	5	0	0	0	0
1994–95	Toronto Maple Leafs	NHL	1	0	0	0	0	—	—	—	—	—
1995–96	Toronto Maple Leafs	NHL	1	0	0	0	0	—	—	—	—	—
1995–96	St. John's Maple Leafs	AHL	77	0	12	12	92	4	0	1	1	2
1996–97	San Antonio Dragons	IHL	69	3	10	13	82	9	0	0	0	10
1997–98	Washington Capitals	NHL	6	0	0	0	4	—	—	—	—	—
1997–98	Portland Pirates	AHL	71	3	15	18	66	10	2	2	4	6
1998–99	New York Islanders	NHL	70	2	6	8	68	—	—	—	—	—
1999–2000	Atlanta Thrashers	NHL	44	0	6	6	36	—	—	—	—	—
2000–01	Atlanta Thrashers	NHL	65	0	1	1	62	—	—	—	—	—
2001–02	Atlanta Thrashers	NHL	19	0	1	1	18	—	—	—	—	—
2001–02	Chicago Wolves	AHL	24	2	9	11	28	—	—	—	—	—
2001–02	Philadelphia Phantoms	AHL	11	0	4	4	14	5	0	1	1	4
2002–03	Philadelphia Phantoms	AHL	59	2	18	20	83	—	—	—	—	—
NHL totals			212	2	14	16	188	—	—	—	—	—
AHL totals			310	7	67	74	329	33	2	4	6	18

=== International ===
Year	Team	Event	GP	G	A	Pts	PIM
1991	Canada	WJC	7	0	2	2	2
1994	Canada	OG	8	0	0	0	8
