= Mark Ouimet (ice hockey) =

Canadian ice hockey player

- Born: October 2, 1971 (age 53); London. Ontario, Canada
- Height: 5 ft 10 in (178 cm)
- Weight: 183 lb (83 kg; 13 st 1 lb)
- Position: Centre
- Shot: Left
- NHL draft: 94th overall, 1990; Washington Capitals
- Playing career: 1992–2004

Mark Ouimet (born October 2, 1971) is a Canadian retired ice hockey centre.

He played for the Baltimore Skipjacks, Worcester IceCats, and Adirondack Red Wings, all members of the American Hockey League, and the Baton Rouge Kingfish of the ECHL.

He played in Europe for SC Herisau (along with brother Terry), Rapperswil-Jona Lakers and ZSC Lions in Nationalliga A and GCK Lions in Nationalliga B.

He played college hockey for the Michigan Wolverines.

== Awards and honours ==
Award	Year
CCHA All-Tournament Team	1990
