= Strauss Mann =

American ice hockey player

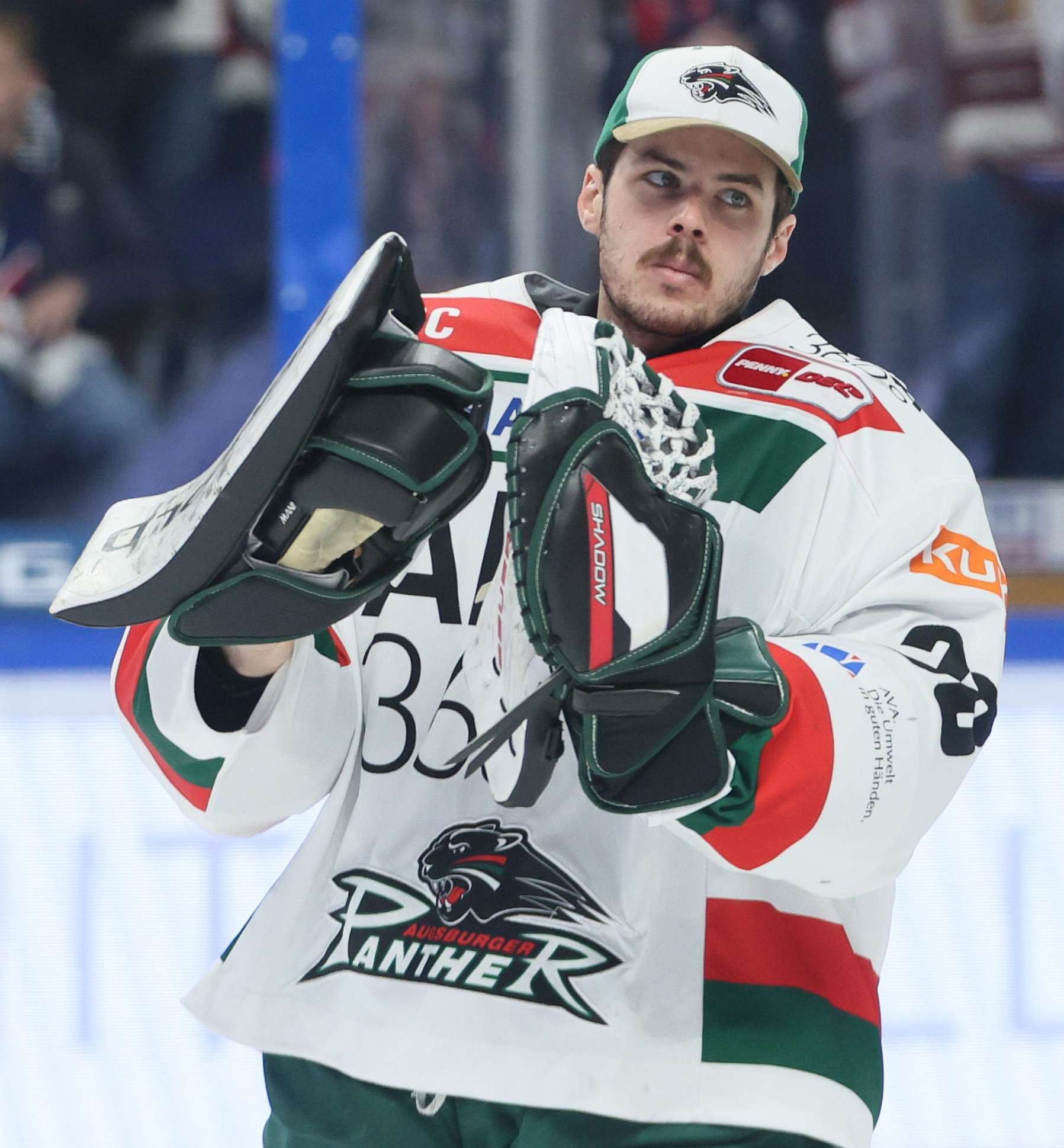
- Mann in February 2025
- Born: August 18, 1998 (age 27) Greenwich, Connecticut, U.S.
- Height: 6 ft 0 in (183 cm)
- Weight: 174 lb (79 kg; 12 st 6 lb)
- Position: Goaltender
- Catches: Left
- SHL team Former teams: Skellefteå AIK; Augsburger Panther
- National team: United States
- NHL draft: Undrafted
- Playing career: 2021–present

Strauss Mann (born August 18, 1998) is an American professional ice hockey goaltender for Skellefteå AIK of the Swedish Hockey League (SHL). He previously played for the Augsburger Panther of the Deutsche Eishockey Liga (DEL) and the Laval Rocket and San Jose Barracuda of the American Hockey League (AHL). He played college ice hockey at the University of Michigan.

== Playing career ==
=== Junior ===
Mann played for the Fargo Force during the 2017–18 season. He appeared in 34 games where he posted a 22–8–1 record, with a 1.86 goals-against average (GAA) and .932 save percentage. During the playoffs with the Force, he recorded a 2.09 GAA and a .932 save percentage.

=== College ===
Mann began his collegiate career for the University of Michigan during the 2018–19 season. During his freshman season, he appeared in 21 games, including 17 starts, where he posted a 6–8–4 record, with a 2.91 GAA and .895 save percentage.

During the 2019–20 season in his second year, Mann posted an 18–13–4 record with a 1.85 GAA and a .939 save percentage. He ranked third in the nation in save percentage and sixth in GAA. With six shutouts this season, Mann tied the Michigan single-season record and holds the single-season record for save percentage and GAA in program history. Following an outstanding season he was named Big Ten Goaltender of the Year, first-team All-Big Ten, and a top-five finalist for the Mike Richter Award.

On September 10, 2020, Mann was named team captain for the 2020–21 season. He became the first goalie to be a captain for Michigan in 78 years and the first non-senior captain in five years. During his junior year he posted an 11–9–1 record, with a 1.89 GAA and .930 save percentage. He was subsequently named a finalist for Big Ten Goaltender of the Year and the Mike Richter Award.

=== Professional ===
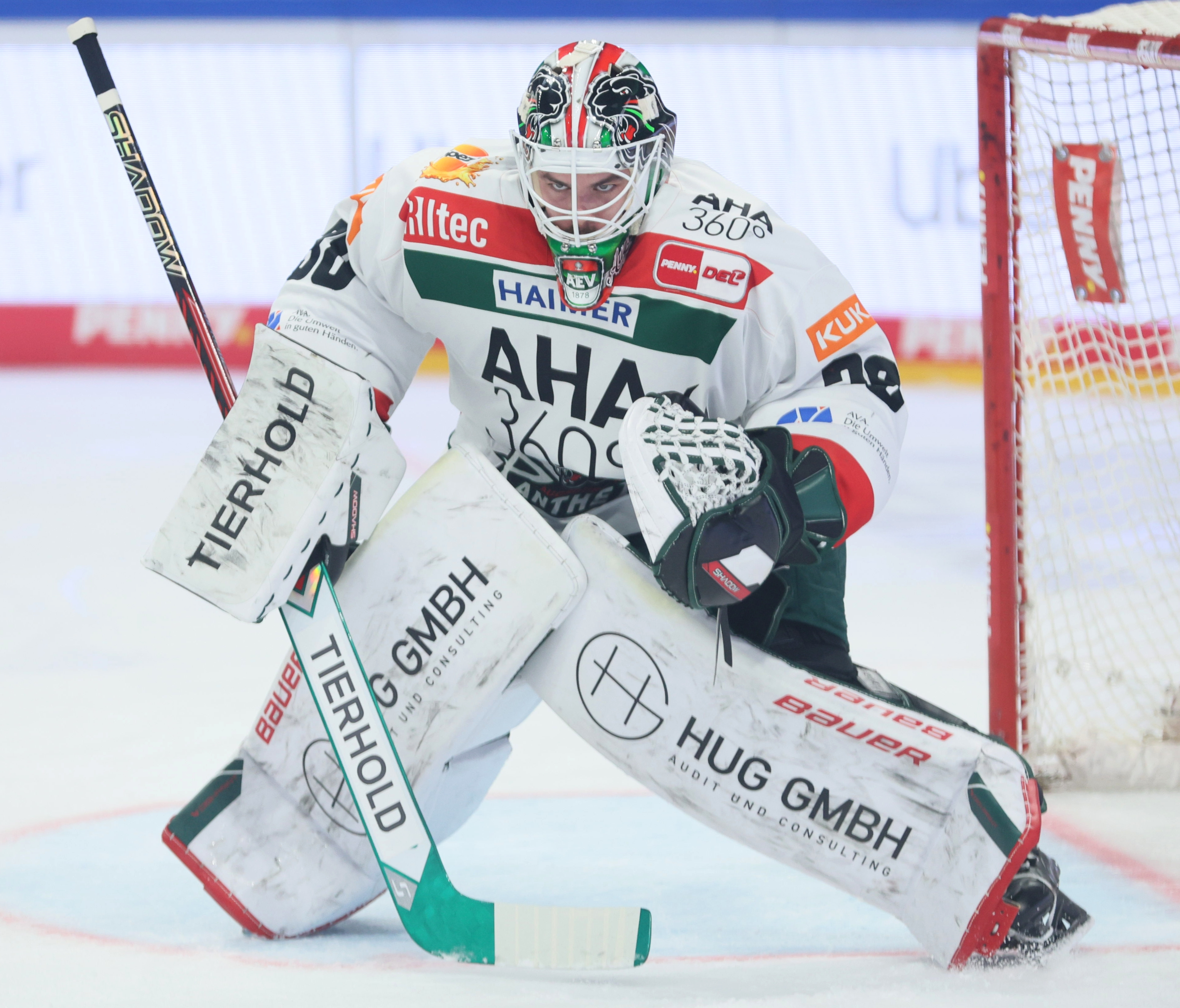
Mann with Augsburg in 2025

On July 6, 2021, Mann signed a professional contract with Skellefteå AIK of the SHL. He made his professional debut on September 18, 2021. He appeared in 22 games for Skelleftea AIK, where he recorded a 13–8–1 record, with a 2.19 GAA, a .914 save percentage and three shutouts. He ranked tied for fourth in the league in GAA, fifth in save percentage, and tied for sixth in shutouts.

On April 19, 2022, Mann signed a one-year contract with the San Jose Sharks of the National Hockey League (NHL). During the 2022–23 season, he split the season with the Sharks' minor league affiliates, the San Jose Barracuda of the American Hockey League (AHL) and the Wichita Thunder of the ECHL.

As a pending restricted free agent with the Sharks, Mann was not tendered a qualifying offer and was released to free agency. On July 3, 2023, he signed a one-year contract with the Laval Rocket, the AHL affiliate of the Montreal Canadiens.

In June 2024, Mann left the Canadiens organization and signed a one-year contract with the Germany-based Augsburger Panther of the Deutsche Eishockey Liga (DEL).

On September 6, 2025, Mann returned to Skellefteå AIK of the SHL. On February 26, 2026, against Frölunda HC, he made 23 saves and recorded his tenth shutout of the 2025–26 season, setting a new single season SHL shutout record, surpassing the previous record of nine held Fredrik Norrena and Oscar Alsenfelt.

== International play ==
On January 13, 2022, Mann was named to Team USA's roster to represent the United States at the 2022 Winter Olympics.

On May 5, 2022, Mann was named to Team USA's roster to compete at the 2022 IIHF World Championship. He posted a 3–1 record, with a 2.42 GAA and .888 save percentage.

== Career statistics ==
=== Regular season and playoffs ===
			Regular season									Playoffs
Season	Team	League	GP	W	L	OT	MIN	GA	SO	GAA	SV%	GP	W	L	MIN	GA	SO	GAA	SV%
2017–18	Fargo Force	USHL	34	22	8	1	1,972	61	5	1.86	.932	–	–	–	–	–	–	–	–
2018–19	University of Michigan	B1G	21	6	8	4	1,153	56	0	2.91	.895	—	—	—	—	—	—	—	—
2019–20	University of Michigan	B1G	35	18	13	4	2,072	46	6	1.85	.939	—	—	—	—	—	—	—	—
2020–21	University of Michigan	B1G	21	11	9	1	1,205	38	5	1.89	.930	—	—	—	—	—	—	—	—
2021–22	Skellefteå AIK	SHL	22	13	9	0	1,318	48	3	2.19	.914	2	1	1	118	4	0	2.03	.922
2022–23	Wichita Thunder	ECHL	13	9	3	1	790	33	0	2.51	.932	—	—	—	—	—	—	—	—
2022–23	San Jose Barracuda	AHL	20	8	7	0	1,048	58	1	3.32	.894	—	—	—	—	—	—	—	—
2023–24	Laval Rocket	AHL	15	2	9	2	765	47	0	3.69	.879	—	—	—	—	—	—	—	—
2023–24	Trois-Rivières Lions	ECHL	11	6	3	2	673	29	1	2.59	.910	—	—	—	—	—	—	—	—
2024–25	Augsburger Panther	DEL	38	12	26	0	2165	122	0	3.38	.900	—	—	—	—	—	—	—	—
SHL totals			22	13	9	0	1,318	48	3	2.19	.914	2	1	1	118	4	0	2.03	.922

=== International ===
Year	Team	Event	Result	GP	W	L	OT	MIN	GA	SO	GAA	SV%
2022	United States	OG	5th	2	1	1	0	130	4	0	1.85	.945
2022	United States	WC	4th	4	3	1	0	223	9	0	2.42	.888
Senior totals				6	4	2	0	353	13	0	2.21	.922

== Awards and honors ==
Award	Year	Ref
College
Big Ten Goaltender of the Year	2020	
All-Big Ten First Team	2020	
All-Big Ten Second Team	2021	

== Records ==
- Swedish Hockey League league record for shutouts in a regular season (10), 2025–26
- Skellefteå AIK club record for shutouts in a regular season (10), 2025–26

Awards and achievements
Preceded by Tommy Nappier	Big Ten Goaltender of the Year; 2019–20	Succeeded by Jack LaFontaine
