= Steve Shields (ice hockey) =

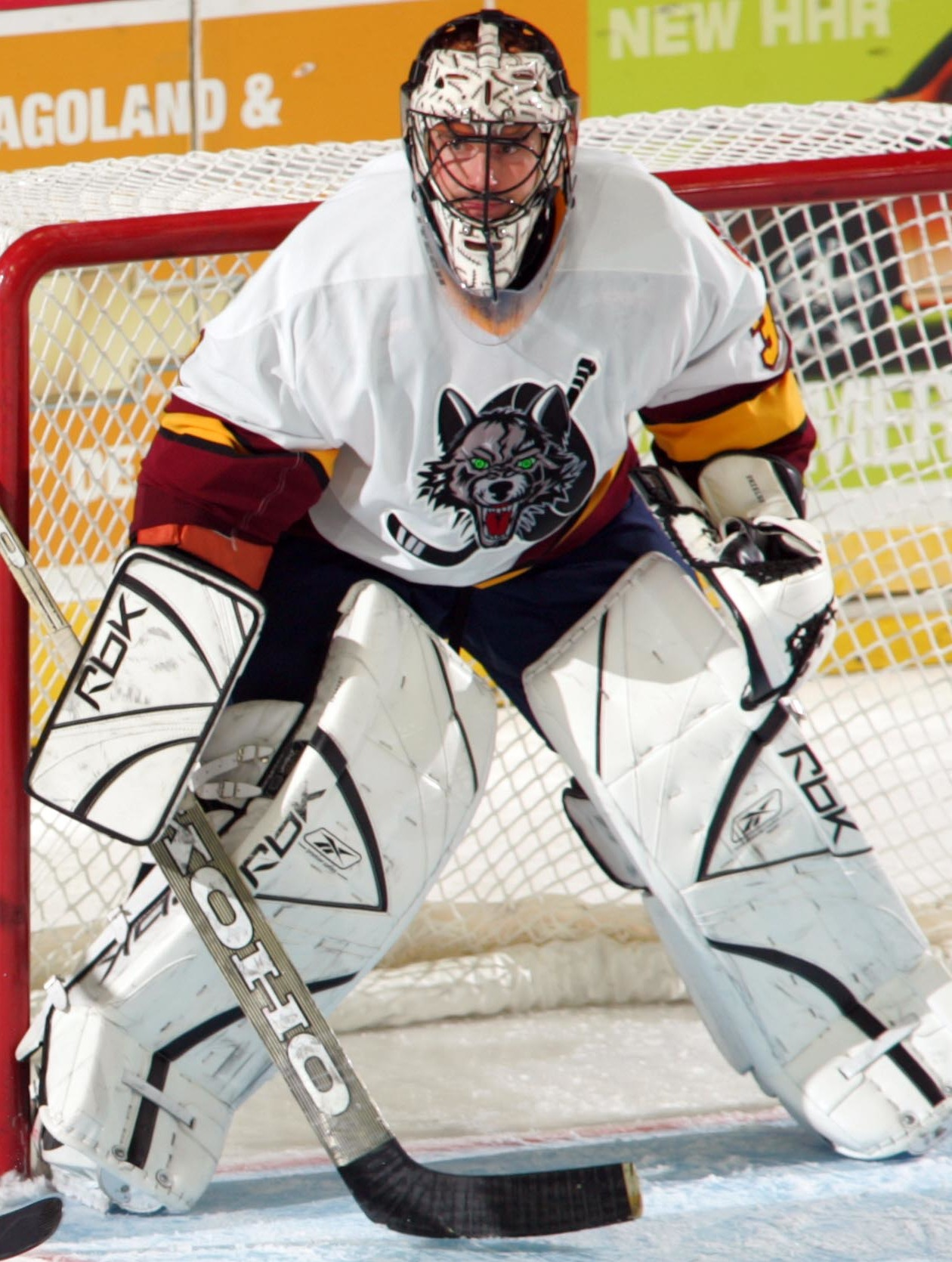
- Shields with the Chicago Wolves in 2005
- Born: July 19, 1972 (age 53) Toronto, Ontario, Canada
- Height: 6 ft 3 in (191 cm)
- Weight: 215 lb (98 kg; 15 st 5 lb)
- Position: Goaltender
- Caught: Left
- Played for: Buffalo Sabres; San Jose Sharks; Mighty Ducks of Anaheim; Boston Bruins; Florida Panthers; Atlanta Thrashers
- NHL draft: 101st overall, 1991; Buffalo Sabres
- Playing career: 1994–2006

Steven Charles Shields (born July 19, 1972) is a Canadian former professional ice hockey goaltender. During his playing career, which lasted from 1994 to 2006, he played ten seasons in the National Hockey League with the Buffalo Sabres, San Jose Sharks, Mighty Ducks of Anaheim, Boston Bruins, Florida Panthers, and Atlanta Thrashers.

== Playing career ==
Shields grew up in North Bay, Ontario, playing minor hockey until bantam level with the local Athletics AA program of the NOHA. At age 16, Shields moved to southern Ontario to play for the St. Marys Lincolns Jr. B club of the OHA, before accepting a scholarship to the University of Michigan.

As a collegiate player, Shields became the first goalie in NCAA history to record 100 career victories and was a two-time All American.

Shields was drafted in the fifth round (#101 overall) in the 1991 NHL entry draft by the Buffalo Sabres out of the University of Michigan. Shields was a journeyman NHL goaltender over his tenure. In his NHL career, Shields would play for the Buffalo Sabres, San Jose Sharks, Mighty Ducks of Anaheim, Boston Bruins, Florida Panthers, and Atlanta Thrashers.

=== 1996 AHL Calder Cup champion ===
After starting the season with only a .500 record, the Rochester Americans rallied late in the season to go on and win the Calder Cup in game seven defeating the Portland Pirates 2–1. Steve Shields set an American Hockey League record with 15 playoff victories. John Tortorella was the coach.

=== 1997 playoffs ===
One of his career highlights was during the 1997 playoffs, when Dominik Hašek was injured. Hašek had been the team MVP and the league's best goalie during the regular season and he had been considered crucial to the Sabres' playoff hopes. With Hašek leaving in the midst of game three of the first round, Shields was forced to step in but he helped the Sabres to rally and defeat the Ottawa Senators.

Shields then played the second round series against the Philadelphia Flyers, as Hašek was suspended for three games after an altercation with reporter Jim Kelley. A line brawl between the two teams broke out in game one that resulted in a memorable goaltender fight between Shields and the Flyers' Garth Snow. Hašek was set to return in game four with the team down by three games in the series, but he told the Sabres' coaching staff he felt a twinge in his knee and left the ice after the pregame skate. Shields turned in another season-saving performance as Buffalo staved off the almost inevitable sweeping elimination with a win. Again before the fifth game, Hašek declared himself unfit to play and Shields would finish the series with Buffalo losing 6–3 and being eliminated.

=== 1999–2000 season ===
Shields's best season was in the 1999–2000 season, when he played in 67 games for the San Jose Sharks while posting respectable goaltending numbers for the team (27 wins, 30 losses, four shutouts, a 2.56 GAA, and a .911 save percentage). San Jose made it to the second round of the playoffs that year.

=== Goalie mask design ===
Shields had a notable goalie mask which was designed while he was a member of the Boston Bruins during the 2002–03 season. Shields's mask was a tribute to former Bruins goalie Gerry Cheevers's famed "stitch mask". He continued wearing the stitch mask after he was traded to the Florida Panthers, and being signed by the Atlanta Thrashers.

== Coaching career ==
Shields served under Mel Pearson as a volunteer assistant coach at Michigan Tech for two seasons from 2011 to 2013 before joining the Florida Panthers as a goaltending consultant in the summer of 2013.

On May 7, 2015, it was announced that Shields was named a volunteer assistant coach for the Michigan Wolverines men's ice hockey team.

== Career statistics ==
			Regular season										Playoffs
Season	Team	League	GP	W	L	T	OTL	MIN	GA	SO	GAA	SV%	GP	W	L	MIN	GA	SO	GAA	SV%
1988–89	North Bay Trappers	NOJHL	—	—	—	—	—	—	—	—	—	—	—	—	—	—	—	—	—	—
1989–90	St. Marys Lincolns	WOHL	26	—	—	—	—	1512	121	0	4.80	—	—	—	—	—	—	—	—	—
1990–91	University of Michigan	CCHA	37	26	6	3	—	1963	106	0	3.24	.878	—	—	—	—	—	—	—	—
1991–92	University of Michigan	CCHA	37	27	7	2	—	2090	99	1	2.84	.885	—	—	—	—	—	—	—	—
1992–93	University of Michigan	CCHA	39	30	6	2	—	2027	75	2	2.22	.909	—	—	—	—	—	—	—	—
1993–94	University of Michigan	CCHA	36	28	6	1	—	1961	87	0	2.66	.892	—	—	—	—	—	—	—	—
1994–95	Rochester Americans	AHL	13	3	8	0	—	673	53	0	4.72	.830	1	0	0	20	3	0	9.00	.824
1994–95	South Carolina Stingrays	ECHL	21	11	5	2	—	1158	52	2	2.69	.912	3	0	2	144	11	0	4.58	—
1995–96	Buffalo Sabres	NHL	2	0	1	0	—	75	4	0	3.19	.875	—	—	—	—	—	—	—	—
1995–96	Rochester Americans	AHL	43	20	17	2	—	2357	140	1	3.56	.891	19	15	3	1127	47	1	2.50	.912
1996–97	Buffalo Sabres	NHL	13	3	8	2	—	789	39	0	2.96	.913	10	4	6	570	26	1	2.74	.922
1996–97	Rochester Americans	AHL	23	14	6	2	—	1331	60	1	2.70	.914	—	—	—	—	—	—	—	—
1997–98	Buffalo Sabres	NHL	16	3	6	4	—	785	37	0	2.83	.909	—	—	—	—	—	—	—	—
1997–98	Rochester Americans	AHL	1	0	1	0	—	59	3	0	3.04	.885	—	—	—	—	—	—	—	—
1998–99	San Jose Sharks	NHL	37	15	11	8	—	2162	80	4	2.22	.921	1	0	1	60	6	0	6.00	.833
1999–00	San Jose Sharks	NHL	67	27	30	8	—	3797	162	4	2.56	.911	12	5	7	696	36	0	3.10	.889
2000–01	San Jose Sharks	NHL	21	6	8	5	—	1135	47	2	2.48	.911	—	—	—	—	—	—	—	—
2001–02	Mighty Ducks of Anaheim	NHL	33	9	20	2	—	1777	79	0	2.67	.907	—	—	—	—	—	—	—	—
2002–03	Boston Bruins	NHL	36	12	13	9	—	2112	97	0	2.76	.896	2	0	2	119	6	0	3.03	.897
2003–04	Florida Panthers	NHL	16	3	6	1	—	732	42	0	3.44	.879	—	—	—	—	—	—	—	—
2005–06	Atlanta Thrashers	NHL	5	1	2	—	1	266	19	0	4.28	.853	—	—	—	—	—	—	—	—
2005–06	Chicago Wolves	AHL	4	2	2	0	—	240	9	0	2.25	.902	—	—	—	—	—	—	—	—
2006–07	Houston Aeros	AHL	1	0	0	0	—	10	3	0	17.65	.750	—	—	—	—	—	—	—	—
NHL totals			246	80	104	39	1	13632	606	10	2.67	.907	25	9	16	1444	74	1	3.07	.901

== Awards and honours ==
Award	Year
College
All-CCHA First Team	1992–93
AHCA West Second-Team All-American	1992–93
All-CCHA First Team	1993–94
AHCA West Second-Team All-American	1993–94
