= American Hockey Coaches Association =

College ice hockey coaches association

- Abbreviation: AHCA
- Formation: 1947; 79 years ago
- Founded at: Boston, Massachusetts, USA
- Purpose: Athletics

The American Hockey Coaches Association was formed in 1947 in Boston. The founding members coached college ice hockey but membership has grown to include coaches at every level of the sport from youth hockey to professional ice hockey, although the organization maintains a focus on the collegiate game.

Aside from its collaborative and community functions, the association also names several award winners each year, most significantly the college ice hockey All-Americans in both divisions and both genders.

They also name the top coach in each of the divisions and genders:

- Spencer Penrose Award, Division I men
- AHCA Coach of the Year, Division I women
- Edward Jeremiah Award, Division III men
- Women's Division III Coach of the Year

The organization also awards the Terry Flanagan Award, given to an assistant coach each year in recognition of the coach's entire career.
