= Calvi Ranch =

Coastal prairie reserve in northern California

- Location within California Location within the United States
- Location: Sonoma County, California
- Nearest city: Occidental, CA
- Coordinates: 38°24′00″N 123°00′00″W
- Area: 69 acres (28 ha)
- Established: 2025
- Governing body: LandPaths

Calvi Ranch is a 69-acre (28 ha) open space reserve of California coastal prairie west of Occidental, California, with stands of coast redwood, bay laurel and coast live oak on the coastal ridge headwaters of the Fay Creek tributary to Salmon Creek.

== History ==
Originally the area was part of the ancestral home of the Kashia Band of Pomo indigenous peoples and the Federated Indians of Graton Rancheria. Following European colonization, Giovanni "Rico" Calvi arrived from Italy to purchase the ranch in 1935. Calvi operated a small sawmill which was unable to convert the largest old-growth forest trees to lumber. LandPaths purchased the ranch in 2025 with the assistance of the California Coastal Conservancy and private individuals. LandPaths will work with the local community to obtain a conditional use permit from Sonoma County to open the property up to passive (walking) public access, including environmental education for local school children.
