= List of killings by law enforcement officers in the United States in the 1990s =

This is a list of people reported killed by non-military law enforcement officers in the United States in the 1990s, whether in the line of duty or not, and regardless of reason or method. The listing documents the occurrence of a death, making no implications regarding wrongdoing or justification on the part of the person killed or officer involved. Killings are arranged by date of the incident that caused death. Different death dates, if known, are noted in the description. This page lists 641 people.

== 1990s ==
The table below lists 641 people.

Date	Name (age) of deceased	State (city)	Description
1999-12-31	Unnamed man	Virginia (Richmond)	
1999-12-30	Scott A. Mauro	Georgia (Martinez)	Shot while pointing shotgun at officers while approaching them. Police were responding to a report of a domestic disturbance. They found Mauro on the porch of the home with a shotgun taped to his throat. A standoff ensued.
1999-12-27	Unnamed man	Georgia (Summerville)	
1999-12-24	Unnamed man	California (Walnut Creek)	
1999-12-11	Silverio Espinoza (49)	California (Napa)	
1999-12-08	Troy Matthews (29)	Pennsylvania (White Haven)	
1999-12-07	Orlando Santana	Maine (Brunswick)	
1999-12-07	Unnamed man	Washington (Seattle)	
1999-11-12	Jamie Dominguez (44)	Texas (Houston)	
1999-11-07	Alfredo Barrett	U.S. Virgin Islands (St. Thomas)	An officer responded to a fight and shot Barrett after he failed to drop a weapon and attempted to grab the officer's gun.
1999-10-12	Ralph Fleming (56)	Florida (Hollywood)	
1999-09-29	Ismael Mena (45)	Colorado (Denver)	Ismael Mena was shot eight times and killed when 14 SWAT officers entered the wrong house while conducting a no-knock raid.
1999-09-25	Owen "Gene" Huffer (61)	Indiana (South Bend)	
1999-09-23	Kenneth "Kenny" Miller (27)	Michigan (Flint)	
1999-09-19	Tracy Mingo (31)	New Jersey (Absecon)	
1999-09-19	Jean Pierre Lafitte	Arizona (Tucson)	
1999-09-18	David J. Paisley (43)	Florida (Popano Beach)	
1999-09-18	Andre Austin (26)	New York (Brooklyn)	
1999-09-17	Kevin Caufield (44)	Maine (Portland)	
1999-09-15	Justin Johnson (19)	Arizona (Tucson)	
1999-09-14	Pedro Gonzales (67)	Arizona (Tucson)	
1999-09-01	Richard Watson (32)	New York (Manhattan)	
1999-09	Antonio Butler (19)	Florida (Miami)	Butler, an unarmed carjacking suspect, was shot dead by a Miami police Sergeant.
1999-08-30	Gidone Busch (31)	New York (Brooklyn)	Gidone Busch was a mentally disturbed male who was shot and killed with 12 bullets outside his apartment by four NYPD officers after he refused to drop a hammer which he had just used to both strike a sergeant in the arm, and threaten other officers.
1999-08-28	Jason Arboleda (21)	Texas (Houston)	
1999-08-27	Unidentified man (35)	New York (Bronx)	
1999-08-24	Colleen Beverly Kelly (37)	Texas (Houston)	
1999-08-18	Scott D. Randell (27)	Utah (West Jordan)	Scott D. Randell of Sandy was shot multiple times by a West Valley City police officer in the cul-de-sac of a West Jordan neighborhood. The shooting happened about 2:30 a.m.. Police believe Randell was one of two men who fled from police several hours earlier after being stopped while driving a reported-stolen car. During the search of the area, Randell sped by police on a motorcycle and failed to stop when pursued by police. Randell allegedly pointed a gun at the two officers who had pursued him. One officer opened fire, striking Randell in the chest.
1999-08-18	Larry Cobb (30)	New York (Manhattan)	
1999-08-15	Angel Reyes (47)	New York (Manhattan)	
1999-08-13	Alvaro Henry Viveros (27)	Texas (Houston)	
1999-08-09	Robert Striker (54)	New York (Manhattan)	
1999-08-05	Jatrek Hewitt (17)	New York (Staten Island	
1999-08-04	Colico Smalls (21)	Ohio (Canton)	
1999-08-03	John Richard Mooney (25)	Texas (Houston)	
1999-08-02	Unidentified man	New York (Massapequa)	
1999-07-26	DuBose, Demetrius (28)	California (San Diego)	DuBose was shot while charging at officers while waving their nunchakus. Officers attempted to question DuBose outside a home that the owner thought had been burglarized; this was resolved before the police arrived as DuBose was a neighbor. Police wanted to handcuff him anyway and confirm his identification despite his roommate and also a neighbor confirming who he was. When DuBose fled officers caught him and they scuffled during which DuBose took nunchakis from two officers.
1999-07-24	Delano Maloney (32)	New York (Brooklyn)	
1999-07-15	Glenn Sigford Sunde (37)	Nevada (Reno)	
1999-07-10	Darren Jason Parton (19)	Florida (Jacksonville)	
1999-07-07	Unnamed woman	Idaho (Sandpoint)	
1999-07-02	Lonnie Dale Jordan (42)	Texas (Weatherford)	
1999-07-02	Quentin Whitfield (22)	Illinois (Calumet City)	
1999-06-30	Unnamed man	Iowa (Des Moines)	
1999-06-28	Renato Mercado (63)	New York (Manhattan)	
1999-06-28	Gregory Lee Richardson (42)	New York (Colonie)	
1999-06-23	Simon Gonzales	Colorado (Castle Rock)	Gonzales's estranged wife entered the Castle Rock Police Department to report her husband Simon had kidnapped their three daughters, but police declined to take action, as Gonzales said he was with the kids at an amusement park. On June 23, Gonzales entered the police station and opened fire before being killed by police. Officers later found the three daughters dead in Gonzales's vehicle. The case led to the Supreme Court case Town of Castle Rock v. Gonzales, which ruled that Castle Rock and its police department could not be sued for failing to enforce Jessica Lenahan-Gonzales's restraining order.
1999-06-18	Ronald Jones (26)	Texas (Houston)	
1999-06-14	Braulio Rios	Texas (Houston)	
1999-06-12	Leigh Edelman (21)	New York (Woodstock)	
1999-06-10	Demetrio Martine Hernandez (33)	Texas (Houston)	
1999-06-06	Agapito Rodriguez (32)	Texas (Dallas)	
1999-05-25	Rodney Mason (38)	New York (Queens)	
1999-05-21	Jesse Zapata	Texas (Abilene)	
1999-05-21	Margaret LaVerne Mitchell	California (Los Angeles)	Mitchell, who was pushing a shopping cart along La Brea Avenue, 'lunged' at officers with a screwdriver and that one of the officers stumbled and then fired, killing her.
1999-05-17	Bryan Baum (21)	California (La Palma)	Baum stabbed his girlfriend and male friend at Baum's home. An officer shot Baum when he continued to stab the male after being commanded to drop the knife.
1999-05-19	David Lee Johnson (31)	Texas (Houston)	
1999-04-17	Reginald LaVergne (18)	Texas (Tennessee Colony)	
1999-04-13	Aquan Salmon (14)	Connecticut (Hartford)	Salmon was shot by officer Robert Allan, who thought that Salmon had a gun on him. Salmon was approached by police because he was sought in connection with an attempted robbery and assault of a woman, along with three other children. Salmon had a cigarette lighter which the officer said he believed was a gun.
1999-04-06	Eulogio Perez Delgado (31)	Texas (Houston)	
1999-04-06	Alvin Ray Onezine (19)	Texas (Houston)	
1999-04-01	Christopher Colberg (37)	New York (Sullivan County)	
1999-03-29	Diane Carter (42)	New Jersey (Phillipsburg)	
1999-03-29	Stephanos Sarzetakis	New Jersey (Phillipsburg)	
1999-03-29	Unnamed man (65)	Minnesota (Brooklyn Park)	
1999-03-29	Manuel Otero (26)	Ohio (Toledo)	
1999-03-28	Adam Clark (20)	Iowa (Des Moines)	
1999-03-24	Kaylyn Cotton-Dobie (34)	Nevada (Reno)	
1999-03-23	Unidentified man	California (Fresno)	
1999-03-23	Jesse Runnels (25)	Florida (Miami)	
1999-03-22	Damien Cersosimo (26)	Connecticut (Hartford)	
1999-03-22	Kevin Wayne McNeil (32)	California (Santa Barbara)	
1999-03-21	Jack Donald Souza (28)	California (Sacramento)	
1999-03-20	Unnamed man (34)	Missouri (Kansas City)	
1999-03-20	Janelle Hylton (21)	New York (Queens)	
1999-03-19	Terrence Romelien (21)	Louisiana (Bossier City)	
1999-03-19	Michael Demonn Carpenter (30)	Ohio (Cincinnati)	
1999-03-15	Zedric S. Johnson (29)	Indiana (Terre Haute)	
1999-03-15	Mark Forde (32)	New York (Brooklyn)	
1999-03-13	Thomas Spranger (49)	New Jersey (Chatham)	
1999-03-13	Unnamed man	Washington (Federal Way)	
1999-03-12	Unnamed man (35)	Wisconsin (Eau Claire)	
1999-03-12	Larry Tobin (53)	California (Fresno)	
1999-03-08	Bryan Alvin Mott (48)	Iowa (Mason City)	
1999-03-04	Unnamed man	Colorado (Greeley)	
1999-02-28	Shaun Eric Studivant (20)	Virginia (Hopewell)	
1999-02-27	Brian Lee (2)	New Mexico (Pinedale)	
1999-02-19	Danny Dunn (37)	California (Kern County)	
1999-02-18	James Shaw	Georgia (Waycross)	Shot while dragging officer with vehicle. Officers had approached Shaw to question him regarding reports of violent threats. The officer had reached inside Shaw's car to stop it.
1999-02-15	Eveliodel Carmel Orellana (41)	Texas (Houston)	
1999-02-12	Raynard Anthony White	Illinois (Chicago)	CPD officers shot and killed White after he allegedly aimed a revolver at them.
1999-02-12	Carlos Mundo Baraona (35)	Texas (Houston)	
1999-02-12	Gustavo Alberto Mejia (31)	Texas (Houston)	
1999-02-04	Amadou Diallo	New York (Bronx)	Amadou Diallo was shot and killed by four undercover and plainclothes NYPD officers in a housing complex during a search for a rape suspect. Diallo had a wallet in his hands, and the officers claimed they thought it was a gun. All four officers were charged with second-degree murder, and were later found not guilty by a jury in 2000.
1999-02-04	Jennifer Strobel (teen)	California (Camp Pendleton)	
1999-01-28	Deborah Meyer	Wisconsin (Kenosha)	Meyer was shot to death after she allegedly pointed a pistol at police.
1999-01-22	Darren Miller (33)	Michigan (Detroit)	One on three people shot to death by officer Eugene Brown.
1999-01-20	Sheryl Sue Seymour	Texas (Houston)	w/f 40, mentally ill, shot and killed by Houston police officer J. G. Lopez after calling for ambulance to take her to hospital. Police claim she lunged at them with a butcher knife. Sheryl was barely 5 ft. tall and weighed about 100 pounds. Lopez was no-billed.
1999-01-18	Stephen Bayer	California (Simi Valley)	According to the Los Angeles Times, "A man described as depressed over business reversals led authorities on a three-county auto chase that ended Monday morning, when police fatally shot him after he pointed a loaded handgun at them, authorities said."
1999-01-17	Landrum JR, Irvin	California (Claremont)	Died six days after being shot multiple times during a routine traffic stop. Allegedly pulled a firearm and fired upon officers, who responded in kind.
1999-01-14	Unnamed man	Florida (Tampa)	
1999-01-14	Donnie DeWayne Jackson (23)	Texas (Harris County)	
1999-01-08	Thomas Pizzuto (38)	New York (Nassau County)	
1999-01-06	Keithen Briscoe (24)	Texas (Houston)	
1999-01-06	Empra TaDar Moore (23)	Texas (Houston)	
1999-01-05	Charles Jones	Nebraska (Omaha)	
1999-01-01	Alfred John Crabb (48)	Texas (Houston)	
1998-12-28	Tyisha Miller (19)	California (Riverside)	Shot dead by police officers called by family members who could not wake her as she lay unconscious in a car.
1998-12-28	Patrick Rion Raimond (39)	Washington (Everett)	
1998-12-27	Alfredo Ramirez (17)	California (Bakersfield)	
1998-12-27	Franklyn Reid (19)	Connecticut (New Milford)	Officer Scott Smith shot Franklyn Reid to death during a foot chase. The following month, Smith was charged with murder in Reid's death, and was sentenced to 6 years of prison in 2000. The conviction was appealed, and Smith pleaded no contest to a misdemeanor charge of criminally negligent homicide, and received two years of probation.
1998-12-22	Michael Franklin (24)	California (Button Willow)	
1998-12-07	Robert Forest Murray (51)	California (Delano)	
1998-12-??	Michael Van Straaten (32)	California (Corcoran State Prison)	
1998-11-27	Brennan King (21)	Illinois (Chicago)	.
1998-11-11	Deandre Thomas	California (Sacramento)	
1998-10-30	Lewis Stanley McClendo (63)	Oregon (Tiller)	
1998-10-29	Kenneth Banks (36)	New York (Manhattan)	
1998-10-25	Kevin Cerbelli (30)	New York (Queens)	
1998-10-25	Derek Kaeseman (24)	Texas (Houston)	
1998-10-23	Charles Roberts Jr. (35)	Texas (Houston)	
1998-10-20	Richard C. Dickie Dow (30)	Oregon (Portland)	
1998-10-07	Darryl Howell (45)	California (Taft)	
1998-10-03	Stephanie P. Ryne	Texas (Houston)	
1998-10-02	Charley Edward Cook (23)	Texas (Fort Worth)	
1998-10-01	Russell Robertson (27)	Texas (Farmers Branch	
1998-09-30	Yvette Marin Kessler (36)	New York (Manhattan)	
1998-09-26	Unidentified man	Texas (Fort Worth)	
1998-09-26	Epolito Salas (17)	Texas (Houston)	
1998-09-24	Erick Costilla (20)	Texas (San Antonio)	
1998-09-23	John Peter Klink (32)	California (Old Medesto)	
1998-09-17	Cristian Sepulveda (26)	New York (Brooklyn)	
1998-09-17	Unidentified man (40)	Texas (Dallas)	
1998-09-13	Coy Mathis Ford (29)	Texas (Houston)	
1998-09-09	Antonio Renteria (23)	California (San Luis)	
1998-09-08	Benjamin A. Williams	South Carolina (Greenville County)	
1998-09-08	Clyde Harvey (54)	South Carolina (Greenville County)	
1998-09-07	Glenn Alton Haring (41)	Arizona (Pima County)	
1998-09-06	Joseph Gasparro (29)	New York (Queens)	
1998-09-05	Robert Lee Tavalaro (41)	California (Yolo County)	
1998-08-21	Edward Bradford (30)	Texas (Houston)	
1998-08-20	Santos Rijos (35)	Texas (Houston)	
1998-08-10	Bryan Stewart (24)	New York (East Meadow)	
1998-08-04	Freddie Rivera (17)	New York (Bronx)	
1998-08-04	Alex Santos (23)	New York (Bronx)	
1998-08-03	Donald Nabors	Alabama (Talladega)	
1998-08-02	Abdiel Burgueno (20)	Arizona (Scottsdale)	
1998-07-??	Gabriel Tithmed	Guam (Harmon)	
1998-07-31	Christopher T. Johnson (29)	New York (North Bellport)	
1998-07-31	Paul Anthony Maxwell (28)	New York (Hempstead)	
1998-07-26	Unidentified man (22)	California (Ivanhoe)	
1998-07-26	Donald Lininger	Arizona (Phoenix)	
1998-07-22	Paul Watson (41)	Texas (Houston)	
1998-07-19	Christopher Malone (24)	New York (Ossining)	
1998-07-18	Lose Luis Zarate (22)	New York (Bronx)	
1998-07-12	Pedro Oregon (22)	Texas (Houston)	
1998-07-04	William Sershon (31)	Arizona (Glendale)	
1998-07-04	Israel Garcia	California (Fresno)	
1998-07-03	Harold Shover (20)	Arizona (Phoenix)	
1998-07-02	Correy Major	Ohio (Cleveland)	
1998-06-13	Dwayne Eli Sanchez (26)	California (Santa Maria)	
1998-06-22	Sterling Robertson (69)	New York (Manhattan)	
1998-06-16	Steven Soma (37)	New York (Holtsville)	
1998-06-11	James Crawley (52)	New York (Bronx)	
1998-05-26	Jose Serrano	New York (Brooklyn)	
1998-05-19	Janet Zuelzke (85)	Arizona (Phoenix)	
1997-05-17	Omar Llanos (18)	Texas (Austin)	An off-duty Austin police officer and his friend spotted a man attempting to break into the officer's truck. They chased the man, Llanos, and the officer shot and killed him after Llanos allegedly said he had a gun.
1998-05-16	Tracy Pollock (43)	Nebraska (Omaha)	
1998-05-13	Jair Salazar	Florida (Delray Beach)	Officer Peter Cagnina fired three shots and killed Mr. Salazar while he "had an object in his hand".
1998-05-11	Robert Williams (17)	Ohio (Arlington Heights)	
1998-05-09	Tom Neville (36)	California (Fresno)	
1998-05-07	Octavio Orozco (23)	California (Fresno)	
1998-05-05	Richard Young (72)	Texas (Houston)	
1998-05-01	Montrail Collins (22)	Tennessee (Chattanooga)	
1998-04-29	Tyrone Napolean Salters	South Carolina (Greenville County)	
1998-04-28	Unidentified man	Arizona (Phoenix)	
1998-04-26	Federico Hurtado (62)	New York (Queens)	
1998-04-25	Anthony Carmichael	Ohio (Dayton)	
1998-04-23	Korey Lavale Rawls (24)	Texas (Houston)	
1998-04-22	Ernie Salas (31)	Arizona (Phoenix)	
1998-04-21	Lyle Bradley Federman (43)	California (Sand Canyon)	Federman was shot 19 times and killed by Kern County Sheriff's Department deputies responding to a 911 call. The Kern County Board of Supervisors approved a $1 million settlement to the family.
1998-04-18	Unidentified man	Texas (Houston)	
1998-04-16	Michael Federici (20)	Arizona (Mesa)	
1998-04-16	Tasia Patton (17)	Arizona (Mesa)	
1998-04-15	Michael Ross Bowers	South Carolina (Greenville County)	
1998-04-13	Daniel Vereline (36)	New York (Manhattan)	
1998-04-13	J. R. Kvernes (21)	Arizona (Phoenix)	
1998-04-10	Jack Allen Crooks (28)	North Carolina (Greensboro)	
1998-04-09	Maxine Cardoza (61)	New York (Brooklyn)	
1998-04-07	Michael Johnson (50)	Arizona (San Carlos Reservation)	
1998-04-07	Unidentified man	Arizona (Phoenix)	
1998-04-05	Michael Hamilton (21)	Illinois (Chicago)	Hamilton was killed by police after allegedly refusing to put down his weapon.
1998-04-03	Kevin Dewayne McDowell (25)	Texas (Houston)	
1998-04-03	Tyrus Ellis (33)	Illinois (Chicago)	Ellis was shot by police during a car chase.
1998-04-02	Ernest Hopkins (27)	Illinois (Chicago)	Hopkins was fatally shot during a failed police sting.
1998-04-01	Gregory Beck (17)	Illinois (Chicago)	Hopkins was fatally shot after a policeman claimed he fired at him.
1998-03-30	Unnamed man	Texas (El Paso)	
1998-03-30	Unnamed man	Mississippi (Jackson)	
1998-03-30	Unnamed man (49)	California (San Jose)	
1998-03-30	Cesare Mollo	New York (Bronx)	
1998-03-28	Antoine Griffith (19)	Missouri (St. Louis)	
1998-03-28	Unnamed man	New York (Albany)	
1998-03-27	Larry Wayne Kimery (48)	North Carolina (Burlington)	
1998-03-27	Michael William Arnold (30)	California (Los Angeles)	
1998-03-27	Jeremy Nuzzo (25)	Illinois (Decatur)	
1998-03-27	Unnamed man	Michigan (Royal Oak)	
1998-03-26	Marwin Prado	California (Vallejo)	
1998-03-07	Chila Amaya	California (San Francisco)	
1998-02-22	Mark Anthony Perez	California (Salinas Valley)	
1998-02-17	Chad Edwards (18)	Illinois (Chicago)	Edwards was visiting neighbors with his girlfriend when police entered unannounced. Edwards, unarmed and wearing no pants, was shot in the head by police.
1998-02-14	Abelino Montoya (18)	New Mexico (Las Vegas)	Las Vegas Officer Joseph Mantelli shot Abelino Montoya after a car chase resulting from a traffic violation stop. Sergeant Steve Marquez fired a shot that did not hit Montoya. Both officers were charged with murder, and Marquez was acquitted by a judge and Mantelli was found guilty of manslaughter. He was sentenced to 13 years of prison, but a state court appeals threw out the conviction and Mantelli served three years after pleading no contest to manslaughter. Montoya's family filed a lawsuit against the City of Las Vegas and were settled with $4 million.
1998-02-12	Richard Snow (57)	Arizona (Phoenix)	
1998-02-12	Troy Edward Davis (27)	Arizona (Phoenix)	
1998-02-12	Fowler, David	Wisconsin (Milwaukee)	Police were responded to a domestic dispute. When Fowler fled, a struggle occurred, and Fowler was shot, apparently by one of the officers.
1998-02-02	Daniel T. Williams (41)	Ohio (Cincinnati)	
1998-01-20	Derrick Calhoun (21)	Ohio (Cincinnati)	
1998-01-13	Robert Clermont (36)	Arizona (Tucson)	
1998-01-09	Andre Stenson (34)	Tennessee (Knoxville)	
1998-01-09	Alfonso Hernandez (16)	California (Visalia)	
1998-01-09	Unidentified man	Arizona (Casa Grande)	
1998-01-08	Jaime Garcia Duran (48)	California (Tulare)	
1998-01-03	Unidentified man	California (West Sacramento)	
1998-01-??	Frankie Ulloa	Guam (Dededo)	
1998-??-??	Unidentified person	Arizona (Tempe)	
1997-12-23	Juan Cortez (29)	California (Visalia)	
1997-12-06	Jeffrey L. Morgan (43)	California (Courtland)	
1997-11-29	Oliver Rodriguez Jr. (34)	Texas (Houston)	
1997-11-13	Jose Benito Saenz (18)	Arizona (Glendale)	
1997-11-06	Angel Rivera (20)	New Jersey (Newark)	
1997-11-01	James Guerrero	Wisconsin (Milwaukee)	Police said Guerrero's death was accidental. However, witnesses say the officer intentionally shot Guerrero in the head, killing him.
1997-10-31	Patrick Bailey (22)	New York (New York)	.
1997-10-30	Rose Marie Treadway (43)	Texas (Houston)	
1997-10-26	Mark Ammons	Nebraska (Omaha)	
1997-10-11	Ernesto Barajas (22)	California (Delano)	
1997-10-02	Othel June Striplin (26)	Arkansas (Fort Smith)	
1997-09-20	Craig Brodrick	Idaho (Boise)	
1997-09-20	Doug Brodrick	Idaho (Boise)	
1997-09-17	Darrell Britton (44)	Texas (Houston)	
1997-09-07	Uvaldo Garcia Armendariz (18)	Texas (Houston)	
1997-09-02	Minerva Gonzales (36)	California	
1997-09-02	James Justin Atkinson	Idaho (Boise)	Shot while dragging a police officer with car. The officer had reached into Atkinson's car to turn off ignition when Atkinson sped off.
1997-08-30	Augusto Melendez	Florida (Miami)	
1997-08-22	Christopher Bacher	Ohio (Dayton)	
1997-08-19	Carl Drega (67)	Vermont (Bloomfield)	
1997-08-17	Donald Wood	Georgia (Brunswick)	Shot after shooting at police. Wood had abducted his estranged wife and led police on a 3.5 hour car chase in a vehicle Wood had stolen at gunpoint.
1997-08-02	Jason McCaslin (17)	Texas (Burnet)	
1997-07-31	Manuel Garcia (30)	California (Selma)	
1997-07-11	Ramon Gallardo (64)	California (Dinuba)	
1997-07-02	Fernando Hernandez	California, (Azusa)	
1997-06-30	Reginald Dorsey (24)	Texas (Houston)	
1997-06-25	Juan Carlos Espinosa (16)	Texas (Houston)	
1997-06-14	Michael Shane Merriott (30)	California (Visalia)	
1997-06-06	Willie K. Friday (34)	Texas (San Antonio)	
1997-06-04	James Willis	Washington (Lake Stevens)	
1997-05-30	Mary Lou Sutter (56)	Arizona (Phoenix)	
1997-05-30	Unnamed man (21)	California (Napa)	
1997-05-29	David Seago (35)	Washington (Tillicum)	
1997-05-23	Jack Ingram (69)	Florida (Boynton Beach)	
1997-05-22	Unnamed man (50s)	Texas (Dallas)	
1997-05-22	Unnamed man	California (Murrieta)	
1997-05-19	Edward James Hayes (20)	Texas (Houston)	
1997-05-19	Todd William Staskal (35)	Arizona (Glendale)	
1997-05-17	Unnamed man	Texas (Austin)	
1997-05-16	Unnamed man	Florida (Clearwater)	
1997-05-16	Simon Velasquez (22)	California (Los Angeles)	
1997-05-15	Frederick Gray (26)	Virginia (Albemarle)	Gray was unarmed when an officer shot and killed him in the doorway of his apartment.
1997-05-11	Jerry Mathias (24)	New Jersey (Newark)	
1997-05-09	Keion Williams (24)	New Jersey (Irvington)	
1997-05-07	Vandarrell Randall (19)	Florida (Fort Lauderdale)	
1997-05-05	Unnamed man	Texas (Fort Davis)	
1997-05-02	Unnamed man	California (National City)	
1997-05-02	Unnamed woman	California (National City)	
1997-05-02	Unnamed man (50s)	Arizona (Tucson)	
1997-05-01	William A. Doyle (49)	Arizona (Tucson)	
1997-04-30	Lamar Donson (25)	Indiana (Lake Station)	
1997-04-30	Unnamed man	Iowa (Cedar Rapids)	
1997-04-29	Kuan Chung Kao	California (Rohnert Park)	Shooting of Kuanchung Kao. Kao was waving a 6' wooden stick in the driveway of his home while he was drunk. After police arrived, Kao struck a police car with the stick, and one of two officers on the scene fired once at Kao.
1997-04-22	Marcus Quentin Williams (26)	Texas (Houston)	
1997-04-21	Calvin Harrington Jr.	Wisconsin, (Milwaukee)	Harrington was shot to death by an undercover cop during a drug sale. Police say it may have been accidental.
1997-04-16	Bryan Daniel Arledge (22)	Texas (Houston)	
1997-03-23	Richard James Davis (46)	Texas (Houston)	
1997-03-21	Timothy Wing	Wisconsin, (Madison)	
1997-03-11	Allen Lane Griffin Jr.	Michigan (Detroit)	1997 Detroit shootings: Shot multiple times moments after shooting and killing a man.
1997-02-28	Larry Phillips Jr	California (Los Angeles)	North Hollywood shootout
1997-02-28	Emil Mătăsăreanu	California (Los Angeles)	North Hollywood shootout
1997-02-25	Jason Erin Marsh (26)	Arizona (Glendale)	
1997-02-20	Chinur Tao Hashim (20)	South Carolina (Greer)	
1997-02-15	Salomon Hernandez (28)	California (Santa Rosa)	Hernandez did not pay at the Coddingtown Exxon gas station, and police were called. Police say Hernandez tried to attack an officer with a screwdriver. Three shots were fired at Hernandez.
1997-02-07	Vernon Huewitt (19)	Fort Pierce, Florida	
1997-01-10	Unnamed man	Texas (Houston)	
1996-12-27	Daniel Mendoza (21)	Nevada (Las Vegas)	Officer Ron Mortensen and another officer were drinking off-duty to celebrate Mortensen's birthday when they decided to "harass dopers and bangers". Mortensen and the other officer drove near a crowd of people and Mortensen fired at them, hitting Daniel Mendoza. Mortensen was convicted of murder charges, while the other officer was never charged and testified against Mortensen.
1996-12-20	Bruno Beltran	Arizona (Tohono O'odham Indian Reservation)	
1996-12-14	Lawrence Sherman (45	Texas (Houston)	
1996-11-14	Julio Valerio (16)	Arizona (Phoenix)	
1996-11-09	Warren L. Williams (27)	Texas (Houston)	
1996-11-08	Alonzo Perez (37)	Texas (Houston)	
1996-10-27	Sarah Rodarmel (20)	California (Sacramento)	
1996-10-25	Mark Milstead	Virginia (Maurertown)	Mark Milstead was fatally shot by Shenandoah County deputy sheriff Chad Kibler as Milstead attempted to flee from an attack by Steven Ramey, the former boyfriend of Milstead's pregnant fiancé, Jill S. Cardwell. Ramey had fatally shot Cardwell and wounded Milstead, then left the scene following a gunfight with the injured Milstead, only to return while Milstead was in the middle of calling 911 for help.
1996-10-16	Ulysses Rose (31)	Florida (St. Petersburg)	
1996-10-23	Mario Heriberto Cuartas (37)	Texas (Houston)	
1995-10-23	Angel Castro (16)	Illinois (Chicago)	According to officers, Castro was trying to flee and pointing a gun when he was fatally shot by police. According to other witnesses, police shot him in the back of the head "without provocation."
1996-09	Joseph Gallegos (18)	Colorado (Bayfield)	Gallegos shot three of his friends to death and engaged in a shootout with police, being shot dead by them.
1996-09-21	Lamer Grable (20)	Michigan (Detroit)	One on three people shot to death by officer Eugene Brown.
1996-09-19	John Johnson (44)	Ohio (Dayton)	
1996-09-02	Linda Barrera (42)	Texas (Houston)	
1996-08-29	Kevin Saunders (37)	California (Santa Rosa)	Saunders had police called on him after a domestic disturbance at his home. Police say Saunders was reaching for a gun in his waistband area, and was unarmed.
1996-08-29	Alexis Garvin (29)	Indiana (Indianapolis)	An officer responding to a burglary alarm shot and killed Garvin, who was allegedly armed with a handgun. Garvin was not a suspect in the burglary.
1996-08-10	James Bradley Wren (35)	Washington (Fall City)	Police Sergeant Mathias Bachmeier killed Wren, then blamed him for a fire at Bachmeier's house. Bachmeier was convicted of setting the fire and killing Wren.
1996-08-08	Otis Cooks (22)	Texas (Houston)	
1996-08-07	Juan Valdez (16)	California (Lamont)	
1996-08-03	Clarence Thurman III	Wisconsin, (Milwaukee)	Thurman was attempting to take an off-duty officer's lawn mower and was shot to death.
1996-07-04	Nathaniel Levi Gaines	New York	Nathaniel Levi Gaines
1996-06-10	Thomas Cruz (32)	Wyoming, (Laramie)	Died after he was hog-tied by police.
1996-06-08	Jaciel Gonzalez (15)	Texas (Houston)	
1996-05-23	Maurice Fareed (24)	Dayton (Ohio)	
1996-05-17	Jeffrey Scott Swafford (23)	Tennessee (Nashville)	Swafford fired on officers serving a warrant for him, killing officer Paul Scurry and wounding another policeman. Other responding officers shot and killed Swafford.
1996-05-17	Willie Brooks (41)	Georgia (Macon)	Brooks, a suspected house burglar, attacked responding officers with a pipe. He was fatally shot in the stomach after reportedly refusing to drop the weapon and charging the officers.
1996-03-26	Donald Hurley (43)	Nebraska (Omaha)	
1996-03-15	Steven Troyce Preston (30)	Texas (Houston)	
1996-03-11	Jose Ferman (20)	Texas (Houston)	
1996-03-07	Clinton Sparks (30)	Texas (Houston)	
1996-03-06	Michael Richard Heaney (48)	Washington (Bothell)	
1996-02-26	Davis Rodriguez Reyes (23)	Texas (Houston)	
1996-02-21	Calvin Moore (18)	Alabama (Mt. Meigs)	
1996-02-17	Juan Carlos Garcia (19)	Texas (Houston)	
1996-01-12	Arzuaga, Frankie	New York, (New York City)	
1996-??-??	Scott Norberg	Arizona (Maricopa County)	
1995-12-24	Clifford Herman Landry (20)	Texas (Houston)	
1995-12-??	Houston Dotson (47)	Arizona (Phoenix)	
1995-11-27	Unidentified man	California (Kerman)	
1995-11-06	Donald Williams (41)	South Carolina (Greenville County)	
1995-10-12	Johnny Gammage	Pennsylvania	Johnny Gammage
1995-09-24	Gary Glover (20)	Texas (Houston)	
1995-08-15	Matthew Morgan (29)	Texas (Houston)	
1995-07-30	James Carter, Jr.	Iowa (Princeton)	James Carter Jr., 41, was fatally shot by law enforcement officers in the aftermath of an early-morning disturbance at Carter's home. Carter's sister was having a fight with her boyfriend when Carter retrieved a shotgun and attempted to get the boyfriend to leave. Police were contacted and ordered Carter to drop the gun. According to reports, Carter pointed the gun at LeClaire police officer Charles Miller, who began firing his gun, and one of the bullets fatally wounded Carter. An investigation by the Iowa Department of Criminal Investigation later cleared Miller of wrongdoing in the incident.
1995-07-29	Marvin Glenn Johnson (28)	Arkansas (Pulanski County)	
1995-07-22	Rosalia Reyes (38)	Arizona (Phoenix)	
1995-07-20	Douglas Fischer (24)	South Carolina (Spartanburg	
1995-07-18	Tyler Lee Boyles	California (Garden Grove)	Tyler Lee Boyles, 20, was fatally shot by Garden Grove, California police after pointing a pellet gun at police officers in the dark. Boyles had called police at 11:02 pm stating he was planning to rob a local convenience store, that he had a handgun, and wanted police to shoot him. Police fired more than 20 shots at Boyles. According to family friends, Boyles may have been suicidal and potentially suffering from a mental illness at the time of his death.
1995-07-15	Travis Allen (17)	Texas, (Bellaire)	Shot in the back. He was unarmed.
1995-07-??	Suzannah Casas Cody	Celifornia	
1995-06-17	Lloyd Bundick (47)	Texas (Houston)	
1995-05-31	Roger Roy Boutte (43)	Texas (Houston)	
1995-05-17	Shawn Nelson (35)	California (San Diego)	1995 San Diego tank rampage: Nelson, a former army tanker, stole a tank from a California Army National Guard post and drove around six miles, causing thousands of dollars of property damage. San Diego officers fatally shot Nelson after he attempted to dislodge them from the roof of the tank by spinning around.
1995-03-31	Dacey Carreira (30)	Texas (Houston)	
1995-03-25	Yong Xin Huang (16)	New York (New York)	Huang was shot by police after having a pellet gun in his possession in Sheepshead Bay, Brooklyn. The officer claimed that he accidentally fired the shot. Huang's family received $400,000 in a lawsuit settlement against the city.
1995-03-04	Ronald Williams (25)	Louisiana (New Orleans)	New Orleans Police officer Antoinette Frank and drug dealer Rogers Lacaze killed fellow NOPD officer Ronald Williams and two workers at a Vietnamese restaurant during a robbery.
1995-03-04	Cuong Vu (17)	Louisiana (New Orleans)	New Orleans Police officer Antoinette Frank and drug dealer Rogers Lacaze killed fellow NOPD officer Ronald Williams and two workers at a Vietnamese restaurant during a robbery.
1995-03-04	Ha Vu (24)	Louisiana (New Orleans)	New Orleans Police officer Antoinette Frank and drug dealer Rogers Lacaze killed fellow NOPD officer Ronald Williams and two workers at a Vietnamese restaurant during a robbery.
1995-02-08	Roderick Carrington (30)	Michigan (Detroit)	One on three people shot to death by officer Eugene Brown.
1995-01-29	Rudy Buchanan (22)	Arizona (Phoenix)	
1995-01-22	Anibal Carrasquillo (21)	New York (Brooklyn)	Carrasquillo, who was reportedly looking into vehicles, died after being shot in the back by a NYPD while running way. Carrasquillo was unarmed.
1995-01-19	Matthew Plummer (26)	Ohio (Dayton)	
1995-01-11	Erma Yvonne Taylor (34)	Texas (Houston)	
1995-01-??	Justin Jerome Cruz (12)	Guam (Cabras)	
1994-12-27	Duc Loi Thanh Truong (19)	Texas (Houston)	
1994-12-22	Anthony Baez	New York (New York)	Anthony Baez
1994-12-??	Paul Kennedy (40)	Utica, New York	Shot six times and killed by Utica Police Officer Alban Uryniak and Sergeant Thaddeus Kaczor. Kennedy was firing a movie prop gun.
1994-11-19	Armando Alegria (17)	California (Kern County)	
1994-11-18	Raymond Marsh	Nebraska (Omaha)	
1994-11-08	Milton R. Frazier Jr. (41)	Texas (Houston)	
1994-11-??	John Magoch (61)	Arizona (Glendale)	
1994-10-12	Derrick Barnes (20)	Texas (Houston)	
1994-10-10	Deborah McCormick (44)	Texas (Houston)	Despite locked doors, former police officer Mike Griffith entered a wedding chapel/flower shop where he had previously purchased flowers and forced McCormick (who co-owned the flower shop with her mother) into a back room where he forced her to perform sex acts, then he repeatedly stabbed her with a butcher knife, robbed her, and left. Griffith was convicted and executed by lethal injection on June 6, 2007, for his crimes against McCormick. A few days after killing McCormick, Griffith robbed a bank, forcing the sole employee to walk to a back restroom where he shot her in the back of the head (she survived). Two weeks later, he robbed a bridal salon and sexually assaulted a salesperson.
1994-10-04	Kim Grove (32)	Louisiana (New Orleans)	Groves filed a complaint against Officer Len Davis after she witnessed him beating a young man Davis mistook for a suspect who shot a police officer. In response, Davis hired a hit man to kill Grove.
1994-09-08	Daryl Howerton (25)	North Carolina (Greensboro)	
1994-08-21	Janet M. Smith (28)	Oregon (Gresham)	Gresham cat hostage taking incident: Smith, a mentally ill woman, took a cat hostage at a supermarket with a knife. After threatening to kill the cat, she stood up and charged at a police officer, who fatally shot her.
1994-08-07	Morse Wayne Holland (20)	Texas (Houston)	
1994-08-04	Eduardo Jose Posada (23)	Arizona (Cochise County)	
1994-08-04	Sergio Cruz Tapia (26)	Arizona (Cochise County)	
1994-08-??	Edward Mallet (25)	Arizona (Phoenix)	
1994-07-20	Ruben Corona Ortiz (18)	Arizona (Nogales)	
1994-06-03	Darryl Robinson (37)	Texas (Houston)	
1994-05-30	Ernest Wright (17)	New York (Brooklyn)	
1994-05-30	John Raymond Gibson (59)	Georgia (Macon)	
1994-05-28	Julian Rodriguez	Illinois (Chicago)	
1994-05-25	Thomas Rodriguez (20)	Illinois (Chicago)	
1994-05-25	Unnamed man (36)	Wisconsin (Madison)	
1994-05-23	Ralph Taylor (75)	Arkansas (Washington)	
1994-05-20	Johnny Hoyt Salter (57)	Alabama (Huntsville)	
1994-05-19	Dario Tamez (28)	Oklahoma (Altus)	
1994-05-17	Alfonso Garza (32)	Texas (Brownsville)	
1994-05-16	Ed Purnell Cotton (47)	Alabama (LaGrange)	
1994-05-16	Robert Hutchison (43)	Iowa (Des Moines)	
1994-05-16	Paul Nowakowski (36)	Wisconsin (Caledonia)	
1994-05-14	Dwayne Hartley (19)	Alabama (Biloxi)	
1994-05-14	John M. Pritchett (27)	Oklahoma (Enid)	
1994-05-12	Curtis Lamont Brown (30)	Kentucky (Louisville)	
1994-05-12	Unnamed man	Georgia (Coweta)	
1994-05-11	Wade Corbett (26)	New Jersey (East Orange)	
1994-05-10	John Anthony Kelly (32)	California (Santa Ana)	
1994-05-10	Unnamed teenage boy (17)	Michigan (Detroit)	
1994-05-08	Gary Boomer (25)	California (Anaheim)	
1994-05-??	Donald Creasy (31)	California (Corcoran)	
1994-04-04	Chavez Gaona, Catarino	Virginia (Harrisonburg)	Chavez Gaona set fire to his rental apartment, and sat in a tree with a shotgun. Firemen responded to the call, then called police, who first attempted to negotiate, but then shot him in order to battle the fire.
1994-04-02	Preston Tate (26)	California (Corcoran)	
1994-02-26	Troy Nelson (67)	Texas (Houston)	
1994-02-08	Daphney Simone Fox (30)	Texas (Houston)	
1994-02-01	Marvin Eugene Tucker (23)	Texas (Houston)	
1993-12-25	Darryn Robins (30)	California (Lake Forest)	Robins, an Orange County Sheriff's Department deputy, was accidentally shot and killed by another officer during a training exercise.
1993-12-15	Luke Grinage (21)	California (Oakland)	Animal control personnel arrived at a house to confiscate a violent dog. The dog's owner, Luke Grinage, refused to give the dog up, and animal control officers called police to the scene. Grinage fled officers as they attempted to arrest him and fired a shotgun at them, killing officer William Grijalva. Police officers fired back and killed Grinage and his disabled father Rafael, who was uninvolved in the incident and instead caught in the crossfire.
1993-12-15	Rafael Grinage (62)	California (Oakland)	Animal control personnel arrived at a house to confiscate a violent dog. The dog's owner, Luke Grinage, refused to give the dog up, and animal control officers called police to the scene. Grinage fled officers as they attempted to arrest him and fired a shotgun at them, killing officer William Grijalva. Police officers fired back and killed Grinage and his disabled father Rafael, who was uninvolved in the incident and instead caught in the crossfire.
1993-12-10	Brian E. Davis (29)	Ohio (Columbus)	Davis was among several suspects pursued by officers following a traffic stop. He shot and killed officer Chris Clites before being killed by other officers.
1993-12-07	Geraldo Jaurequi (34)	California (Madera)	
1993-12-02	Alan Winterbourne (33)	California (Oxnard)	Winterbourne went to an Employment Development Department branch in Oxnard and opened fire with a 12-gauge shotgun at the employees. When the shotgun jammed, he pulled out a .44 magnum pistol and continued shooting. He then walked out through a side door, where he exchanged gunfire with four police officers. Two rounds entered Winterbourne's shoulder and chest, respectively, wounding him. A vehicle pursuit ensued, where Winterbourne took out a Browning .300 rifle and fired at a police car. The bullet ricocheted through a spotlight, killing James O'Brien, a sergeant and detective with the Oxnard Police Department. The police held their fire for the safety of passing motorists, and the pursuit continued. Winterbourne then parked at a local EDD branch in Ventura, with six police cars forming a perimeter. He got out of his car, brandishing a Ruger Mini-14 loaded with a 30-round magazine. He finally moved towards an adjoining office, where he was shot nine times by six officers as he was 40 feet away from the door.
1993-11-16	Lamont Lamponie (15)	New York (New York City)	Lamponie, along with two accomplices, reportedly tried to rob an off-duty officer and two friends. The officer shot and killed Lamponie and held a 15-year-old accomplice down until police arrived to arrest him; the third suspect fled.
1993-11-16	Marc Morse (17)	New York (New York City)	Morse and two other teenagers allegedly attempted to rob an off-duty transit officer as he walked home. After one of the suspects reportedly fired a gun, the officer fired multiple rounds, fatally shooting Morse in the head.
1993-11-15	Freddy Perry (45)	Texas (Houston)	
1993-11-03	Ronald Belville (22)	Florida (Kissimmee)	Officers responding to a noise complaint saw Belville with a pistol and confiscated it from him. As he was walked back to their patrol car, he fled and allegedly brandished a second handgun. Officers opened fire and fatally shot Belville; a police K-9, Astor, was also killed by gunfire. Belville was a recidivist who expressed desires to be killed by police to his family. Two officers were cited for negligence in failing to properly frisk Belville before he brandished his second weapon.
1993-10-11	Christopher Keys (21)	Illinois, (Chicago)	Police were investigating a burglary at a store when they saw a car that matched the description of the vehicle used by the burglar. When police identified themselves to Keys, the driver, he allegedly ran over one of the officers, injuring him. Two officers fired several shots, striking Keys in the chest and killing him.
1993-09-26	Eric Spencer (21)	Texas (Fort Worth)	Spencer entered a car driven by his mother as he attempted to flee the police. He was fatally shot by a police officer after allegedly attempting to take the officer's service weapon.
1993-09-10	Henry Noriega (23)	California (Corcoran)	
1993-08-30	Kenneth Brian Fennell (23)	South Carolina (Guilford County)	
1993-07-30	Don Myrick (53)	California (Santa Monica)	Myrick, a saxophonist and former member of Earth, Wind & Fire, was fatally shot by a Santa Monica policeman during a narcotics investigation. While attempting to serve a search warrant, an officer mistook a butane lighter in Myrick's hand for a weapon. He fired a single bullet that hit Myrick in the chest. Myrick died in the hospital shortly afterwards.
1993-06-25	Jose Luis Montoya (38)	Texas (Houston)	
1993-06-15	Marlon Bowen (14)	Ohio (Dayton)	
1993-06-12	unidentified man	Florida (Kendall)	An off-duty officer encountered a man suspected in an armed robbery several minutes before. The man allegedly brandished a gun at the officer, who shot the man dead.
1993-06-07	Maurice Morrison (43)	California (Fresno)	
1993-05-18	Terrance L. Cloyd (20)	Alaska (Anchorage)	
1993-04-23	Robert Xavier Espinoza (29)	Texas (Houston)	
1993-04-16	Emogene Thompson	Georgia (Duluth)	Gwinnett County Police Department Ofc. Michael Harold Chapel shot to death a woman outside a muffler shop (demolished, now entrance to Sugar Hill) for cash hoarded by victim. Extra security was ordered in transporting Chapel due to rumors of a possible planned prison-break ambush.
1993-04-15	Paul Monroe	Texas (Austin)	Paul was shot in the abdomen by Austin Police Department (APD) Ofc. Steven Deaton after being told to drop a duffel bag he was holding and get on the ground. Deaton would work for APD for 26 years before taking a position in the Williamson County Sheriff's Office (WCSO). Deaton would ultimately resign from his post at WCSO in September, 2019 after sharing racist and insensitive posts on Facebook.
1993-04-10	Felipe Madera (22)	Texas (Irving)	Police responded to a call of a man randomly shooting a gun at an apartment complex. As officers attempted to stop Madera, he allegedly shot at them and was killed by return fire. A grand jury declined to charge the two officers who fired shots.
1993-04-08	Michael Mullins (32)	California (Corcoran)	
1993-04-01	Gerald Snead (38)	North Carolina (Burlington)	Snead opened fire in a supermarket, killing an employee and wounding two other people. He shot at police responding to the scene and was killed by return fire.
1993-03-29	Michael Kotten (23)	Ohio (Perrysburg Township)	
1993-03-26	Jim Ray Holloway (53)	California (Sacramento)	
1993-03-25	Tommy Joel Lewis (37)	South Carolina (Aiken County)	
1993-03-24	unidentified man	California (Bloomington)	
1993-03-23	Donald Karl Hart (22)	Florida (St. Petersburg)	
1993-03-21	Lamont J. Belle (18)	Louisiana (Marrero)	
1993-03-09	Michael James Bryant (37)	California (Los Angeles)	Officers from three jurisdictions pursued Bryant by vehicle to an apartment complex in Highland Park after Bryant allegedly struck a San Marino police officer. Bryant, a 320-pound man, was struck with batons, tased, hogtied, and placed on his stomach in a swimming pool, even though hogtying and the specific restraint used had been banned by the Los Angeles Police Department due to its danger. He died soon after. Bryant's autopsy determined that he died of complications from cocaine usage and asphyxiation from police restraint.
1993-03-06	Juan Ramon (14)	Texas (Haltom City)	
1993-03-05	James N. Bell Sr.	Pennsylvania (Lower Paxton Township)	
1993-03-04	Tyres McDowell (27)	Louisiana (Metairie)	
1993-03-03	Michael John Noyes (33)	California (Redding)	
1993-03-03	William Miles (68)	Louisiana (Shreveport)	
1993-02-28	Peter Gent (24)	Texas (Waco)	Bureau of Alcohol, Tobacco, Firearms and Explosives (ATF) agents killed six members of the Branch Davidians during a shootout with members of the cult at the Mount Carmel Center, their compound, commencing the Waco siege. ATF agents said Gent and Schroeder were shot after they fired at agents, but Branch Davidians stated that both men were unarmed, along with the four other people shot.
1993-02-28	Winston Blake (28)	Texas (Waco)	Bureau of Alcohol, Tobacco, Firearms and Explosives (ATF) agents killed six members of the Branch Davidians during a shootout with members of the cult at the Mount Carmel Center, their compound, commencing the Waco siege. ATF agents said Gent and Schroeder were shot after they fired at agents, but Branch Davidians stated that both men were unarmed, along with the four other people shot.
1993-02-28	Jaydean Wendel (34)	Texas (Waco)	Bureau of Alcohol, Tobacco, Firearms and Explosives (ATF) agents killed six members of the Branch Davidians during a shootout with members of the cult at the Mount Carmel Center, their compound, commencing the Waco siege. ATF agents said Gent and Schroeder were shot after they fired at agents, but Branch Davidians stated that both men were unarmed, along with the four other people shot.
1993-02-28	Peter Hipsman (28)	Texas (Waco)	Bureau of Alcohol, Tobacco, Firearms and Explosives (ATF) agents killed six members of the Branch Davidians during a shootout with members of the cult at the Mount Carmel Center, their compound, commencing the Waco siege. ATF agents said Gent and Schroeder were shot after they fired at agents, but Branch Davidians stated that both men were unarmed, along with the four other people shot.
1993-02-28	Perry Jones (64)	Texas (Waco)	Bureau of Alcohol, Tobacco, Firearms and Explosives (ATF) agents killed six members of the Branch Davidians during a shootout with members of the cult at the Mount Carmel Center, their compound, commencing the Waco siege. ATF agents said Gent and Schroeder were shot after they fired at agents, but Branch Davidians stated that both men were unarmed, along with the four other people shot.
1993-02-28	Michael Schroeder (29)	Texas (Waco)	Bureau of Alcohol, Tobacco, Firearms and Explosives (ATF) agents killed six members of the Branch Davidians during a shootout with members of the cult at the Mount Carmel Center, their compound, commencing the Waco siege. ATF agents said Gent and Schroeder were shot after they fired at agents, but Branch Davidians stated that both men were unarmed, along with the four other people shot.
1993-02-28	Paul J. Boucher (38)	Connecticut (Hartford)	Police went to Boucher's home to investigate an alleged theft of cash. He apparently attacked officers two times with a knife, prompting them to shoot him at least seven times, killing him.
1993-02-27	Elwood Rayvon Lee (34)	Washington (Spokane)	Police went to Lee's house after his wife reported to law enforcement that Lee had assaulted her. Lee allegedly aimed a rifle at officers, causing one to shoot him dead.
1993-02-26	Lenas Kakkouras (29)	New York (Mount Vernon)	Kakkouras was stopped by two officers after he became lost trying to drive to a dinner date in Yonkers. He allegedly rammed the officers, one of whom fired three shots into Kakkouras's vehicle in a maneuver prevented by department policy, wounding him. Kakkouras left the vehicle and was fatally shot during a scuffle with another officer. The officer who shot Kakkouras was acquitted of manslaughter charges, but his family was awarded $17.5 million in damages.
1993-02-26	Richard E. Hager Jr. (20)	Indiana (Indianapolis)	Hager ambushed an officer at a Village Pantry store, shooting him in the head from behind. The officer survived and was able to return fire, killing Hager.
1993-02-24	Edward Anthony Gerdelman (31)	Oklahoma (Oklahoma City)	Gerdelman was shot twice in the abdomen by an officer investigating a robbery when he allegedly pointed a gun at the officer. He died at St. Anthony Hospital on March 5.
1993-02-24	Tony Oliver (30)	Tennessee (Memphis)	Oliver was shot and killed by an off-duty narcotics officer, allegedly when he threatened the officer with a handgun. A witness said that Oliver was shot after he dropped his gun.
1993-02-23	Nancy Koppel (41)	Virginia (Fairfax County)	Koppel was killed when an off-duty Fairfax County police officer returning home from work crashed into her 1990 Dodge Shadow at an intersection.
1993-02-22	Judy Holden Plum (46)	South Carolina (Darlington)	Police responded after Plum's son called emergency services to report his mother had slashed her wrists. As officers approached, Plum allegedly brandished a pistol and was shot to death by officers. The weapon was later identified as a BB gun.
1993-02-22	Bounthanh Kinnavongsa (28)	Idaho (Twin Falls)	Kinnavongsa allegedly fired an AK-47 rifle at a police officer during a traffic stop, shooting him in the leg. He was killed when the officer returned fire.
1993-02-22	Mary Johnson (68)	Louisiana (Shreveport)	Johnson reportedly threatened officers with a hammer and revolver after they arrived to help a SWEPCO worker turn off her electricity. Johnson allegedly shot and wounded one of the officers, who shot her dead.
1993-02-22	William Dawson (32)	Florida (Lake Park)	Dawson, a burglary suspect, allegedly rammed an officer's patrol vehicle as he tried to flee. The officer fired 16 shots at the unarmed Dawson as he reportedly drove away, killing the suspect.
1993-02-21	John Carnell (31)	California (Rialto)	Two officers attempted to search Carnell, a security guard, outside the bowling alley he was assigned to protect. Carnell allegedly reached for a gun, causing officers to shoot and kill him.
1993-02-21	Thien Van Nguyen (39)	Virginia (Arlington)	Nguyen allegedly kidnapped his wife and other people as they left an Arlington church on February 20. After a standoff that lasted into the early hours of February 21, Nguyen reportedly began shooting at police, wounding two officers, before other officers shot him dead.
1993-02-21	unidentified woman	California (Los Angeles)	Three women allegedly attempted to carjack an off-duty sheriff's deputy. When one of the women confronted him with a pistol, the deputy shot her dead during a shootout.
1993-02-20	Bernie Heyman (61)	Florida (Jacksonville)	Officers responded to a burglary alarm at a clothing store. They shot and killed the store's owner, Heyman, when he allegedly fired his gun and brandished it at officers.
1993-02-20	Mark John Dillon (41)	New Jersey (Mountainside)	Dillon was struck and killed by an off-duty Plainfield police officer on Route 22. The officer drove off, but was stopped by an on-duty Newark detective. He was charged with drunken driving and leaving the scene of an accident.
1993-02-19	Joseph Alexander Elliot IV (42)	North Carolina (Charlotte)	Elliot reportedly began firing a shotgun from his house. After a 10-hour standoff with police, he allegedly engaged in a shootout with officers, injuring one before being killed by return fire.
1993-02-19	Richard Newman (49)	Louisiana (Lafayette)	Newman, a lieutenant with the Crowley Police Department, was accidentally shot and killed by a New Iberia police officer during an arrest.
1993-02-18	Santa Colon (40)	Pennsylvania (Philadelphia)	Officers responded to a dispute in the street. As they arrived, one of the participants fired a revolver in the air, causing an officer to fire several rounds. The shots wounded the original shooter, aged 19, and fatally struck Colon, who had been attempting to stop the argument.
1993-02-18	William Howard Hayes (69)	North Carolina (Rockingham County)	Police responded to a man shooting at cars from his home south of Madison. When they arrived, Hayes, the homeowner, reportedly fired multiple shotgun blasts at them, causing them to retreat. He engaged in a two-hour standoff, which ended when officers shot him to death as he allegedly charged them while raising his weapon.
1993-02-18	Basilio Reyes Jr. (28)	California (Yolo County)	An assault suspect reportedly broke into an off-duty sheriff's deputy's house near Clarksburg, angry that the deputy had investigated his criminal activity. The deputy shot and killed him in the driveway.
1993-02-16	unidentified man	Arkansas (Jacksonville)	A man was fatally shot by police when he reportedly confronted an officer with four guns.
1993-02-15	Rafael Lopez (47)	Florida (Miami Gardens)	Lopez was shot dead by police after he allegedly charged an officer with a crowbar outside an elementary school, where Lopez intended to pick up his children. His family said he was schizophrenic and suffered from emotional problems.
1993-02-15	unidentified man	Michigan (Melvindale)	Two officers chased a man fleeing a suspicious vehicle. During a scuffle, the man allegedly took an officer's gun and shot him in the leg. The second officer shot and killed the suspect.
1993-02-13	Scott Oberholtzer (23)	Texas (McKinney)	Oberholtzer allegedly opened fire on two officers approaching his vehicle for a traffic stop, injuring one. The two officers returned fire and killed him.
1993-02-12	unidentified man	California (San Diego)	During a traffic stop on Interstate 5, an officer arrested the 21-year-old driver for speeding. The passenger exited the vehicle and allegedly pulled out a gun on the officer during the scuffle, causing the officer to shoot the suspect once and kill him.
1993-02-12	Kenneth Ray Lamb (37)	California (Modesto)	Police responded to a call of shots fired at a home. Lamb reportedly pointed a bolt-action rifle at an officer who arrived, causing the officer to shoot him dead.
1993-02-11	Jim Taylor (81)	Georgia (Rockdale County)	Taylor allegedly fired at officers repeatedly who attempted to approach his house during a standoff. On the seventh occasion, a deputy fatally shot Taylor.
1993-02-11	Clarence Anthony Harris (17)	California (San Bernardino)	After two officers briefly pursued a vehicle, it stopped and Harris allegedly exited the vehicle with a shotgun. Officers shot and killed him, stating he had brandished the weapon at them. After the two officers arrested the three other occupants of the vehicle, they controversially hugged each other and exchanged a high five.
1993-02-11	Dequan Bland (14)	New Jersey (Bloomfield)	Bland, an escaped juvenile detainee, stole a vehicle with a 16-year-old accomplice in Newark. When an officer attempted to stop the vehicle, Bland allegedly rammed the police car. After a chase along the Garden State Parkway, Bland allegedly struck multiple police vehicles as they tried to box his car in. An officer fatally shot Bland as he drove away. His accomplice was arrested.
1993-02-10	unidentified man	Connecticut (Bridgeport)	An officer responding to a burglary was reportedly shot at by the suspect. The officer shot and killed the man.
1993-02-09	Ken Evans (30)	California (Sacramento County)	A suspected serial robber, Evans, allegedly robbed a Burger King. Police officers fired eighteen shots at him after he reportedly pointed a gun at them and ran away, shooting him twice and killing him.
1993-02-09	Nathaniel Winston (59)	Indiana (Gary)	Officers entered a home to serve Winston an arrest warrant on drug-related charges. Winston allegedly began firing a revolver, injuring a policeman, before being shot dead by two officers.
1993-02-09	Frank Fallings (43)	Georgia (Atlanta)	Two officers witnessed three men, one of them armed, robbing a civilian. When the officers chased the men, the armed man, Fallings, allegedly brandished a handgun, causing an officer to shoot him twice and kill him.
1993-02-08	Dalphine Renee Carter (33)	California (Lodi)	Police responding to a call of a woman at a mental hospital chasing other patients with a knife encountered Carter. When she allegedly advanced at him with a butcher knife and resisted Mace, an officer shot her twice, killing her.
1993-02-07	Joneal Clyte Williams (54)	North Carolina (Charlotte)	An intoxicated off-duty officer collided with a Mercedes head-on at an intersection, then crashed into another vehicle. Four passengers in the Mercedes were killed and two others injured. Two passengers in the third vehicle were also injured.
1993-02-07	Roger Williams (28)	North Carolina (Charlotte)	An intoxicated off-duty officer collided with a Mercedes head-on at an intersection, then crashed into another vehicle. Four passengers in the Mercedes were killed and two others injured. Two passengers in the third vehicle were also injured.
1993-02-07	Ashley Coffey (6)	North Carolina (Charlotte)	An intoxicated off-duty officer collided with a Mercedes head-on at an intersection, then crashed into another vehicle. Four passengers in the Mercedes were killed and two others injured. Two passengers in the third vehicle were also injured.
1993-02-07	Jasmine Thompson (5)	North Carolina (Charlotte)	An intoxicated off-duty officer collided with a Mercedes head-on at an intersection, then crashed into another vehicle. Four passengers in the Mercedes were killed and two others injured. Two passengers in the third vehicle were also injured.
1993-02-07	Gregory Warren (37)	Nevada (Las Vegas)	Police responded to a call about a man with a knife at an apartment complex. Warren allegedly told officers to kill him, then advanced on officers, who fatally shot him.
1993-02-06	Allen Frederick Childress (35)	Delaware (New Castle)	Childress allegedly fired a rifle as a Delaware state trooper attempted to intervene in a quarrel between him and his wife. The officer said he told Childress to drop the weapon multiple times, then fatally shot him in the chest.
1993-02-06	William Wooten (28)	Virginia (Norfolk)	Police responded to a domestic dispute at a house. They engaged in a standoff with Wooten, who had taken his family hostage, before Wooten opened fire, fatally shooting his wife and daughter and wounding his mother-in-law. Officers shot and killed Wooten after he allegedly brandished a handgun at them.
1993-02-05	Patrick Allen Ladd (35)	California (Fresno)	Ladd died in a shootout with Fresno police as they tried to serve an arrest warrant.
1993-02-05	unidentified man	California (San Diego)	State narcotics agents shot and killed a man during a raid at a house after he allegedly brandished a handgun at them.
1993-02-05	unidentified man	California (Arcadia)	Police fatally shot a robbery suspect during a shootout; an officer was struck in his bulletproof vest, but was uninjured.
1993-02-05	Larry Isaac Powell (39)	Tennessee (Chattanooga)	Powell died after being restrained in a chokehold by police investigating him for drunk driving. His death was ruled a homicide by the county medical examiner.
1993-02-03	unidentified man	California (Stanislaus County)	Police responded to a trespasser at a house. They approached the house and found a man sleeping with a .22-caliber rifle at his side. Police woke the man up with flashlights and attempted to tell him to comply, but he allegedly fled and brandished the gun at a deputy who approached him. The deputy fired and fatally shot the man.
1993-02-03	James W. Rehe (54)	Pennsylvania (Warren)	Rehe was killed in a head-on crash with an off-duty Pennsylvania state trooper driving to work on U.S. Route 62.
1993-02-03	Beth Irwin (22)	Tennessee (Maury County)	Irwin was killed when a police officer lost control of his vehicle during a high-speed chase, crossed lanes, and struck her vehicle.
1993-02-03	Norman Silva (30)	Colorado (Denver)	Silva, a Denver Sheriff Department officer, was accidentally shot in the chest by another deputy while they transported a prisoner in the basement of the Denver City Jail. He died at Denver General Hospital soon after.
1993-02-01	unidentified man	California (Anaheim)	After a bank robbery, three armed men were pursued as they fled a vehicle. One of the men was shot dead by police in unclear circumstances.
1993-01-31	Timothy Copeland (19)	Washington, D.C.	Copeland was shot and killed by a police sniper after a hostage crisis in which Copeland fatally shot a woman and an infant and wounded another woman.
1993-01-30	Muhammed, Mujahid (24)	New York (New York City)	Four masked men robbed a bank. As the robbers fled, they fired on responding police officers and wounded one. As he sought cover, Muhammed allegedly took Vargas as a human shield and shot and wounded an officer. Seven officers returned fire, fatally wounding Muhammed and Vargas. A grand jury cleared the officers of wrongdoing in March 1993, describing the shooting as a "tragic event."
1993-01-30	Auera Bonnie Vargas (41)	New York (New York City)	Four masked men robbed a bank. As the robbers fled, they fired on responding police officers and wounded one. As he sought cover, Muhammed allegedly took Vargas as a human shield and shot and wounded an officer. Seven officers returned fire, fatally wounding Muhammed and Vargas. A grand jury cleared the officers of wrongdoing in March 1993, describing the shooting as a "tragic event."
1993-01-29	Derek Allen (28)	Ohio (Warren)	Allen intruded into his ex-girlfriend's house and took a 3-week-old baby hostage. Police entered the house and shot and killed Allen after he allegedly shot the baby in the head, killing him.
1993-01-29	Rot Nguyen (17)	Washington (Tacoma)	Two officers investigating car burglaries discovered two teenagers hiding in bushes. As the teenagers fled, one of them, Nyugen, allegedly pulled out a pistol and tried to shoot a policeman, but the gun misfired. The officer fatally shot him after he reportedly took the officer's baton and hit him over the head. The second suspect, aged 16, was arrested.
1993-01-28	Charles James Hunter (30)	Texas (Abilene)	Hunter, who reportedly took a 5-year-old boy hostage, stopped breathing after allegedly fighting police officers who were trying to restrain him. He began breathing after treatment in hospital, but later relapsed and died.
1993-01-25	William Klinger (20)	Texas (Marion)	Two officers stopped Klinger as he drove away from the scene of a disturbance; Klinger was asked to return to the scene. When he did, the officers tried to search the vehicle for weapons. Klinger allegedly brandished a pistol and fired a shot during a scuffle with the two deputies. One officer fatally shot Klinger.
1993-01-25	William Ferguson (31)	Michigan (Taylor)	Ferguson, a robbery suspect, allegedly struck two officers and two police cars with his vehicle as he tried to flee the scene. Officers shot him, and he drove away before hitting a tree and dying of his injuries.
1993-01-25	Willie Lee Murphy (30)	Florida (Jacksonville)	An officer flagged down Murphy in connection with an attempted kidnapping. Murphy allegedly drove off with the officer hanging on to the door. The officer fired three shots, killing Murphy.
1993-01-25	Gregory Thyrion (30)	Wisconsin (Green Bay)	Police responded to calls of a man threatening suicide. After a standoff involving officers in which the suspect, Thyrion, allegedly threatened to "cut up" officers with a 5-inch folding knife, he reportedly advanced at an officer, who fatally shot him.
1993-01-24	Joseph D'Ambrosio (46)	New York (New York)	D'Ambrosio, armed with a .25-caliber handgun, shot and wounded a man in the street in Woodhaven, Queens. He allegedly pointed his gun at a responding officer, who shot him in the head. D'Ambrosio died at hospital on January 25.
1993-01-23	Christopher Stephenson (19)	New York (New York)	After a carjacking and police chase, Stephenson and a 16-year-old suspect fled the scene. Stephenson, who was allegedly armed with a .45-caliber handgun, was fatally shot in the torso by police as he fled, while the minor was arrested.
1993-01-22	David Holly (35)	New Mexico (Albuquerque)	During an undercover investigation into counterfeiting, Holly, a reported "counterfeiting mastermind," allegedly brandished a firearm at an officer and was killed by police.
1993-01-22	unidentified man (33)	Pennsylvania (Philadelphia)	As police attempted to apprehend a man trying to intrude into a house in Center City, the man allegedly fought with the officers and tried to take one of their guns. The officer took her gun and fatally shot the man three times.
1993-01-22	Manuel Medina Ramirez (63)	California (Stockton)	As officers served a search warrant on his house, Ramirez fired on police, killing Officer Arthur Parga. Another officer returned fire and shot Ramirez in the stomach, killing him.
1993-01-21	Joan K. Warrington (33)	Maryland (Glen Burnie)	Warrington allegedly pointed a .25-caliber handgun at police who responded to her house. When she refused to drop the weapon as commanded, an officer shot her several times, killing her.
1993-01-21	Dennis Lee Springer (24)	California (Modesto)	Police were investigating a vehicle in Salida when the driver fled the scene. Springer eventually crashed in Modesto outside a junior high school. As the officers boxed the driver in, he allegedly rammed an officer's car, injuring him. Two officers opened fire and fatally shot Springer.
1993-01-21	unidentified man (39)	Michigan (Detroit)	A man was shot and killed by police at his apartment after allegedly advancing towards two officers with a knife.
1993-01-20	Amado Alonzo Escobedo (40)	California (East Rancho Dominguez)	Escobedo allegedly pointed an "assault weapon" at Los Angeles County Sheriff's Department deputies as they served a narcotics warrant at his house, causing officers to shoot him dead. His wife was arrested on suspicion of drug dealing.
1993-01-20	Robert Barry (23)	Florida (Pompano Beach)	After thieves stole a car outside Barry's home and fled, he followed them in his own vehicle while his wife called police. As he pursued the thieves, Barry allegedly ran a red light and was broadsided by a police car responding to the theft. Barry was ejected from the car and died.
1993-01-18	Charles Adams (18)	Amarillo, Texas	Died the following day.
1993-01-18	Johnny Lee Tisdale (72)	Arkansas (Sulphur Springs)	Tisdale reportedly set fire to his home and went to his nephew's adjacent house, outside of which he opened fire with multiple firearms on law enforcement as they responded. He was shot and killed by officers.
1993-01-17	unidentified man (20s)	Ohio (Cleveland)	Police responded to a man firing shots randomly and were reportedly fired upon as they arrived. Officers chased the gunman and fatally shot him after he allegedly shot and injured an officer during the pursuit.
1993-01-17	Rodolfo Sanders (23)	Louisiana (Shreveport)	Sanders, a security guard working for the rapper Scarface (Brad Jordan), reportedly fired into a crowd after Jordan was injured by gunfire following a concert. An off-duty police officer working as a security guard at the venue shot Sanders dead when he refused to drop the weapon and continued firing it.
1993-01-17	Paul Quincy Blair (26)	Georgia (Mableton)	Blair committed an armed robbery at a Texaco gas station and fled the scene, pursued by police. After stealing a second vehicle, he allegedly attempted to run down an officer, who fired shots. Blair drove two miles, then crashed his car and died. An autopsy determined he died of a gunshot wound to the back.
1993-01-16	Johnny A. Dutton (37)	Oklahoma (Oklahoma City)	Dutton allegedly pointed a crossbow at officers responding to a domestic dispute. He was shot and killed after refusing to drop the crossbow and "indicating" he would shoot the officers. Dutton was intoxicated.
1993-01-14	Roy James Gilliam (32)	Maryland (Bel Air)	Gilliam's wife called police, telling them he was barricaded in his house with several guns and held suicidal ideation. After a three-hour standoff, Gilliam reportedly pointed a handgun at officers who had entered his house. Officers shot him to death.
1993-01-13	Raleigh D. Lemon (32)	Maryland (Baltimore)	Police arrested Lemon for burglary and fighting responding officers. Due to injuries sustained during his arrest, he was transported to Bon Secours Hospital. After Lemon's handcuffs were removed during a medical examination, he fled the scene and was fatally shot in the back outside the building by an officer assigned to guard him. The officer alleged her gun discharged after Lemon turned around during the pursuit and reached for the weapon. In September 1993, attorneys for Lemon's family filed a $264 million lawsuit against Baltimore police, alleging excessive force was used.
1993-01-13	Frederick Buytas (44)	Indiana (Speedway)	Police responded to around a dozen calls from a house and found Buytas, who fired several shots and demanded to see President George H. W. Bush. After a two-hour standoff, Buytas was shot in the chest and killed by Patrolman Scott Scales after he allegedly pointed his gun at another officer and pulled the trigger, but the gun misfired.
1993-01-12	Ted Jordan (26)	Oklahoma (Bartlesville)	After a bank was robbed, an officer pursued a pickup truck that matched the description of the suspects' vehicle. The officer unsuccessfully ordered the vehicle to stop and fired three shots at it after he allegedly saw the occupants reaching for weapons. The vehicle turned around and reportedly drove at the officer, who fired another shot. The truck then crashed, and Jordan was found shot dead inside. Two other suspects, including the driver of the truck, were later arrested.
1993-01-12	Lamon Hicks (45)	Indiana (Gary)	During a traffic stop, Hicks backed away from an officer and allegedly pulled out a gun during a struggle, causing the officer to shoot and kill him.
1993-01-11	Willie Fulton (50)	Pennsylvania (Philadelphia)	A marked police car collided with a civilian vehicle at an intersection in North Philadelphia; the police car entered the sidewalk and struck Fulton. He died at Temple University Hospital of his injuries on February 5.
1993-01-11	unidentified man	California (Salinas)	A police officer approached a man who resembled a robbery suspect outside a 7-Eleven. The man allegedly brandished a shotgun, and the officer shot him multiple times, killing him.
1993-01-11	Dwight Pink (42)	Connecticut (Portland)	Pink stole a car from a dealership in East Lyme, shooting and wounding a car salesman in the process. As law enforcement pursued him, he crashed and immediately carjacked a school van. During this second phase of the chase, Pink shot at officers and police cars and took a bus driver hostage. After the bus crashed into a guard rail on Route 66, Pink exited the vehicle and exchanged gunfire with police, who killed him. A student and the driver of the school van were wounded during the chase, the student by gunfire and the driver by broken glass.
1993-01-09	Eugene W. Sharp (24)	Maryland (Middle River)	Officers responded to a man who had struck a patron at a restaurant and attempted to arrest him. During the arrest, the man's two brothers attempted to help him and fought officers. During the struggle, one of the officers discharged his weapon, fatally shooting Sharp in the abdomen. He died at R Adams Cowley Shock Trauma Center the following day.
1993-01-09	Gina Nueslin (22)	Maryland (Baltimore County)	Baltimore Police Sergeant James Kulbicki shot Nueslin, a pregnant woman, in the back of the head in Gunpowder Falls State Park. The two had conducted an affair since Nueslin was 19, and due to Nueslin's pregnancy, Kulbicki murdered her to avoid paying child support. Kulbicki was found guilty of the murder in three trials in 1993, 1995, and 2024. He was sentenced to life imprisonment without the possibility of parole in 2025.
1993-01-08	Brian Browder (19)	Houston, Texas	Died the following day.
1993-01-07	Mary Rives Moore (56)	Tennessee (Memphis)	Moore was struck by a Memphis police vehicle and died the next day. She apparently disobeyed several pedestrian conventions before she was hit.
1993-01-07	Steven Gutierrez (26)	California (Oxnard)	Gutierrez allegedly fired a shot at an off-duty police officer investigating a robbery at a restaurant. The officer fired back and fatally shot Gutierrez, who died at hospital.
1993-01-07	unidentified man	Alabama (Trussville)	A theft suspect armed with a handgun was shot and killed during a confrontation with police.
1993-01-05	Vincent Ferrentino (27)	New York (New York)	Ferrentino and an accomplice were both shot as they attempted to carjack an off-duty narcotics officer. The officer opened fire, killing Ferrentino and wounding his partner.
1993-01-05	Vince Bacs (55)	Tennessee (Nashville)	Bacs, a mentally ill Vietnam veteran, charged an officer with an ax and was shot and killed.
1993-01-04	Randall Benfield (39)	Ohio (Akron)	Benfield reportedly verbally threatened officers as they responded to his apartment. He then allegedly brandished a handgun at officers, who shot him. Benfield died in hospital on February 23.
1993-01-04	Hector Frausto (26)	California (Los Angeles)	Police responded to a call of 15 to 20 gang members loitering in an alley. When they arrived, Frausto, reportedly armed with a .22-caliber pistol, pointed his gun at the officers, one of whom shot and killed him with a shotgun.
1993-01-03	Roosevelt Williams (81)	West Virginia (Logan)	Williams engaged in a 14-hour standoff with police. He was killed in an exchange of gunfire with officers.
1993-01-03	Calvin Stills (35)	Louisiana (Shreveport)	Stills shot an officer in the arm while the officer was investigating a homicide; the officer returned fire, killing Stills.
1993-01-02	Calvin Henderson (41)	Texas (Cleburne)	Police responded to a disturbance at a home. An officer encountered Henderson outside and shot him to death after he allegedly brandished a pistol.
1993-01-02	Tyrone Brown (29)	Louisiana (Angola)	On January 1, Brown escaped the Louisiana State Penitentiary, where he was serving a 25-year sentence for armed robbery. The following day, he was spotted by law enforcement in the nearby woods; police said at the time that Brown was most likely searching for a vehicle for his getaway. He was shot and killed while running from police after they allegedly fired warning shots and told him to surrender.
1993-01-02	John Ervin Sr. (54)	New York (New York)	Ervin Sr. allegedly threatened his son and his son's girlfriend with a gun. When officers arrived to conduct a search, Ervin Sr. allegedly pointed a gun at police, causing them to shoot him.
1993-01-02	Amos Perry (15)	Texas (Houston)	Perry was shot by police after wielding a machete and advancing towards them. He died at a hospital of his injuries.
1993-01-02	James Cox III (23)	Florida (Jacksonville)	Cox III opened fire at a battered women's shelter with a shotgun, having abducted his ex-girlfriend's mother and forced her to drive him to the shelter. An officer shot and killed Cox when the suspect allegedly pointed the gun at him.
1993-01-01	Fernando Arizpe (21)	Texas (Brownsville)	Arizpe, driving an ATV, was killed when his vehicle collided with a Cameron County Sheriff's Office vehicle. Police alleged Arizpe was driving on the wrong side of the road and without headlights (the crash occurred at 9:15 p.m.).
1993-01-01	Michael Orsini (42)	Maine (Augusta)	Orsini exchanged gunfire with an Augusta police officer when the officer attempted a traffic stop. Orsini was shot several times and died at a hospital later that day.
1993-01-01	Mazen Mufti (24)	Washington (Seattle)	Mufti died after his car collided with a marked police car near the Seattle Center.
1992-12-31	Robert J. Fortunato (39)	Pennsylvania (Indiana)	
1992-12-30	John P. Massengale III (38)	Georgia (Brooks)	
1992-12-30	Hakim Trawick (26)	Pennsylvania (Philadelphia)	An officer was on patrol when he heard gunfire and saw Trawick and a 23-year-old man, who had just shot and wounded a man in a robbery, fleeing the scene with handguns. One of the suspects allegedly fired at the officer, who returned fire, fatally wounding Trawick. The other suspect was apprehended nearby. A bystander was also wounded in the incident, although it is unclear who shot her.
1992-12-30	Carlos Rojas (17)	New York (New York)	Five males attempted a robbery at a laundromat. An armed off-duty police officer opened fire on the robbers after they allegedly fired a gun, killing Rojas and wounding a 20-year-old man. The remaining robbers, a teenager and two adults, were arrested.
1992-12-30	David Stewart (23)	Pennsylvania (Penn Township)	Stewart stabbed his father before brandishing a knife at officers, causing them to shoot him.
1992-12-24	Joseph Alva (27)	South Carolina (Columbia)	Alva, a Richland County's sheriff's deputy, was accidentally shot by another deputy during an arrest.
1992-12-15	Stephen Marthaller (36)	Washington (Redmond)	Marthaller and two women robbed a video store. As they fled the scene, responding officers shot Marthaller, who died of his injuries on December 30.
1992-12-12	unidentified man	Tennessee (Nashville)	A burglary suspect was shot and killed by police after allegedly punching an officer in the face and lunging at him.
1992-11-05	Malice Green (35)	Michigan (Detroit)	Green, a motorist, was pulled over by police after stopping outside a house known for drug activity. When Green allegedly failed to give an officer a vial of cocaine, the officer struck him repeatedly in the head with a flashlight, causing fatal head injuries. Both officers at the scene were convicted of involuntary manslaughter.
1992-11-02	Tryna Lavette Blackmon (24)	California (Rialto)	Blackmon, a robbery suspect, allegedly pointed a gun at officers and was shot.
1992-10-20	Odell Andrews (27)	California (Rialto)	Andrews was shot after allegedly pointing a gun at officers following a police chase.
1992-10-09	Tesfaie Mokuria (39)	Texas (Dallas)	Mokuria was shot and killed after allegedly lunging towards police with a knife. His daughter, Sara Mokuria, went on to co-found Mothers Against Police Brutality.
1992-10-02	Donald P. Scott	California (Malibu)	Donald P. Scott
1992-09-04	Greg Page	Jacksonville, Florida	Shot by off-duty officer.
1992-09-04	Jimmy Mabe	Jacksonville, Florida	Shot by off-duty officer.
1992-08-25	Susan Harrison White (42)	Texas (Houston)	Shot multiple times by officer Joseph Kent McGowan after he falsely obtained a warrant for her arrest. He was later found guilty of murder after he claimed she was holding a weapon, but she was hanging up the phone with 911. She had anticipated the killing from this particular officer. He was eventually sentenced to 20 years in prison.
1992-08-25	Rosebud Denovo	California (Berkeley)	Shot while threatening officers with a machete, after breaking into the UC Berkeley chancellor's home
1992-08-21	Sammy Weaver	Idaho	Ruby Ridge
1992-08-22	Vicki Weaver	Idaho	Ruby Ridge
1992-07-03	Jose Garcia	New York	Garcia allegedly pulled out a revolver and was wounded by gunshots from the officer's sidearm. He was taken to hospital, where he was pronounced "dead on arrival".
1992-05-02	Martin A. Rivas (25)	California (Los Angeles)	Rivas was killed by National Guard troops after he allegedly tried to drive through a barricade.
1992-05-01	Howard Eugene Martin (22)	California (Pasadena)	Police attempted to disperse party-goers when gunshots were fired. Police returned fire, striking Martin, an uninvolved bystander watching from his friend's apartment balcony.
1992-05-01	Charles William Orebo (31)	California (Los Angeles)	While driving to a home Orebo cut off another driver, who was an LAPD officer commuting to work. After the officer honked and pulled up next to Orebo, the passenger of Orebo's vehicle pulled out a gun and pointed it at the officer, who shot and killed Orebo. Orebo himself was unarmed. The passenger and a third occupant were arrested and the passenger was charged with Orebo's death, while the third occupant was not charged.
1992-04-30	Cesar Aguilar (18)	California (Los Angeles)	Police shot and killed Aguilar after he allegedly pulled out a weapon on officers during looting. It was later determined that Aguilar had a brown-and-black plastic toy gun.
1992-04-30	Franklin Benavidez (27)	California (Los Angeles)	Benavidez and another man were shot by police after a robbery at a gas station. Police say Benavidez was pointing a shotgun and the other man was holding a beer can. The other man survived.
1992-04-30	Mark Garcia (15)	California (Lennox)	Following a looting at a jewelry store a shootout occurred between police and looters, during which police shot and killed Garcia. Police initially stated that Garcia had been fleeing in a car but other occupants of the vehicle denied this. Witnesses stated that Garcia was scaling a fence when he was shot and that deputies didn't give any verbal warning before firing. Witnesses also disputed the police account that the youths had fired at police.
1992-04-30	Brian Edmund Andrew (30)	California (Compton)	Andrew was seen running from a shoe store with a bottle of beer and pairs of shoes. After Andrew dropped the shoes an officer caught up to him in an alley and shot Andrew in the face during a fight.
1992-04-29	Dennis Ray Jackson (38)	California (Los Angeles)	Jackson and Taylor were killed by a police officer during a shootout with a man wielding a rifle, who police believed was Jackson. Police were unable to recover their bodies for more than an hour.
1992-04-29	Anthony Taylor (31)	California (Los Angeles)	Jackson and Taylor were killed by a police officer during a shootout with a man wielding a rifle, who police believed was Jackson. Police were unable to recover their bodies for more than an hour.
1992-04-29	DeAndre Harrison (17)	California (Los Angeles)	During the 1992 Los Angeles riots officers were fired on outside a business. Police fired back, killing Harrison, although it is not known if he was the one who fired at police.
1992-03-28	Robin Marie Pratt	Washington (Everett)	
1992-03-13	Charles E. Foster	Tennessee (Antioch)	Foster allegedly pointed a rifle at police when they raided his apartment to look for drugs. Officers shot him dead.
1992-02-09	Unknown man	New York (Bronx)	Two police officers shot and killed a man who was wielding a gun.
1992-02-01	Dickerson, Joel	Tennessee (Woodbine)	Dickerson fired a gun from his porch during an argument with his girlfriend. Officers arrived and immediately shot him dead when he walked onto his porch, alleging he pointed a gun at them.
1992-??-??	Fidelino Pascua (26)	California (Marina)	
1991-12-25	Stacey Anderson (35)	Florida (Port St. Lucie)	
1991-12-11	Ed Evans (63)	Kentucky (Calhoun)	
1991-12-11	Lawrence Bromley (32)	Texas (Dallas)	
1991-12-08	Rolf Rahn (37)	New York (Genoa)	
1991-11-28	Donzell Dean (31)	Michigan (Detroit)	
1991-11-23	Mark Harkin (32)	Kansas (Kansas City)	
1991-11-17	Robert Vordinelli (30)	Pennsylvania (Milton)	
1991-10-28	Unnamed man	Kansas (Prairie Village)	
1991-08-30	Shawn Washington (19)	Mississippi (Laurel)	
1991-08-26	Rebecca Justice (40s)	Texas (Austin)	
1991-08-14	James Moore (41)	Kentucky (Louisville)	
1991-07-27	John Mosier (28)	Missouri (Independence)	
1991-07-26	Helen McConnell (61)	Florida (Oak Hill)	
1991-07-24	Ronnie Cannon (53)	Michigan (Montcalm County)	
1991-07-20	Terry J. Schmidt II (24)	Oregon (Corvallis)	An officer shot Schmidt five times, killing him, after Schmidt allegedly advanced on him with a knife and told the officer to shoot him.
1991-07-17	Leonard Wedemayer (36)	Wisconsin (West Allis)	
1991-07-03	Bobby S. Garrett	Tennessee (Nashville)	Garrett was shot dead by an officer after allegedly attempting to break into a vehicle. Police said the officer's gun went off when he tried to handcuff Garrett.
1991-06-26	Norman Hughes (26)	Ohio (Dayton)	
1991-06-26	Norman Napier (18)	Ohio (Dayton)	
1991-06-12	Jose Millan (37)	Texas (Houston)	
1991-06-11	Norman Watford (39)	Pennsylvania (Philadelphia)	
1991-05-30	Unnamed man (29)	California (Los Angeles)	
1991-05-19	Albran Trevino (24)	Wisconsin (Milwaukee)	
1991-04-21	Gregory Sevier (22)	Kansas (Lawrence)	Sevier, a Native American, was shot and killed by Officers Ted Bordman and James Phillips in his parents' home after Sevier allegedly lunged at Bordman with a knife. The officers were responding to a 911 call from Sevier's mother, who was concerned for her son's welfare after he allegedly locked himself in his bedroom with a knife.
1991-04-13	Michael Lee Henry (19)	Oregon (Portland)	
1991-04-09	Alfonzo Matkins (32)	Alabama (Huntsville)	
1991-03-25	Shawn Joseph (19)	New York (Bronx)	
1991-03-23	Leonard Morris (28)	Virginia (Roanoke)	
1991-03-23	Richard Root (48)	Vermont (Fairfax)	
1991-03-09	William Squire (41)	New York (Brooklyn)	
1991-02-11	David May (27)	Florida (West Palm Beach)	
1991-01-30	Robert Blackledge (23)	Florida (Plantation)	
1991-01-09	Nathaniel Newkirk (28)	Maryland (Baltimore)	
1991-01-02	Demetrio Perez (32)	Nebraska (Omaha)	
1990-12-18	Elmer Tipping (25)	Texas (Dallas)	
1990-12-14	R. L. Rose (53)	Texas (Dallas)	
1990-12-03	Frank Passini	Maine (Vassalboro)	
1990-11-27	Michael Allen Massengale	California (Sacramento)	
1990-09-27	Mehrdad Dashti	California (Berkeley)	Dashti took 33 people hostage at a bar near the UC Berkeley campus for seven hours, armed with a MAC 10 handgun, a semiautomatic handgun, and a revolver. At the end of the hostage situation, Dashti killed one hostage and wounded seven other people. Dashti was killed by several police officers.
1990-09-13	Anthony Tumminia (21)	California (San Diego)	Tumminia was shot by SDPD officer John Cain alleging he had another officer's nunchakus. Witnesses to the shooting disputed that account.
1990-07-09	Leonard Barnett	Indiana (Indianapolist)	
1990-06-09	Butch Friend	Maine (Portland)	
1990-04-10	Phillip Pannell	New Jersey (Teaneck)	Pannell was fatally shot by police while fleeing. An officer was charged with manslaughter but acquitted.
1990-03-30	Joseph Williams (26)	New York (Brooklyn)	
1990-03-24	Jacques Brooks (26)	Tennessee (Nashville)	Brooks allegedly brandished a knife while advancing towards an officer's patrol car, causing the officer to shoot him four times.
1990-03-22	Adolph Archie	Louisiana (New Orleans)	Adolph Archie was beaten to death by police officers. His killing took place at the police precinct station house of Officer Earl Hauck, who Archie had allegedly killed during a shootout earlier that evening. Archie had been shot in the arm before being taken into custody and was first driven to a hospital, but did not enter it, before being taken to station house and beaten to death. Some of Archie's injuries included a fractured skull, kicked in teeth, a fractured larynx, and severely hemorrhaged testicles.
1990-03-16	James Higgins (36)	Texas (Houston)	
1990-03-01	David Cotto	New York (Brooklyn)	Cotto, 20 years old, was shot when he raised two knives and "rushed the officers". Police had been called to Cotto's apartment because of a fight with a neighbor. Cotto's family said that he was not attacking the police officers, but was "staggering blindly" due to the effects of the mace with which he had been sprayed.
1990-02-19	Anthony Booker (19)	Florida (Miami)	Booker, a half-brother of Bob Marley, fired a shotgun once at an officer in a mall parking lot and an officer returned fire.
1990-02-11	Albert Lopez (19)	New York (Manhattan)	
1990-02-11	Jesus Montana (29)	New York (Manhattan)	
1990-02-09	Armstrong, Derek "Cat" (28)	New York (Brooklyn)	Armstrong was unarmed when shot by police.
1990-02-06	Jose Sanchez (24)	New York (Brooklyn)	
1990-02-03	Unnamed child (13)	New York (Manhattan)	
1990-02-03	Andres Cortez Romero (31)	California (Corcoran)	
1990-01-31	Jose Lebron (14)	New York (Brooklyn)	Police fatally shot Lebron, an unarmed 14-year-old, when they tried to question him about a $10 theft.
1990-01-26	Unnamed man	New York (Manhattan)	
1990-01	Louis Liranso (17)	New York (Brooklyn)	Liranso was shot by police when he tripped crossing the threshold of a restaurant.

== See also ==
- Death in custody § United States
- Henry A. Wallace Police Crime Public Database
- List of cases of police brutality
- List of countries with annual rates and counts for killings by law enforcement officers
- List of law enforcement officers killed in the line of duty in the United States
- List of law enforcement officers convicted for an on-duty killing in the United States
- List of shootings by US immigration agents
- List of police reforms related to the George Floyd protests
- List of unarmed African Americans killed by law enforcement officers in the United States
- Lists of killings by law enforcement officers
- Police brutality in the United States
- Police misconduct § United States
- Police riot § United States
- Police use of deadly force in the United States
