= LandPaths =

Nonprofit organization in California, US

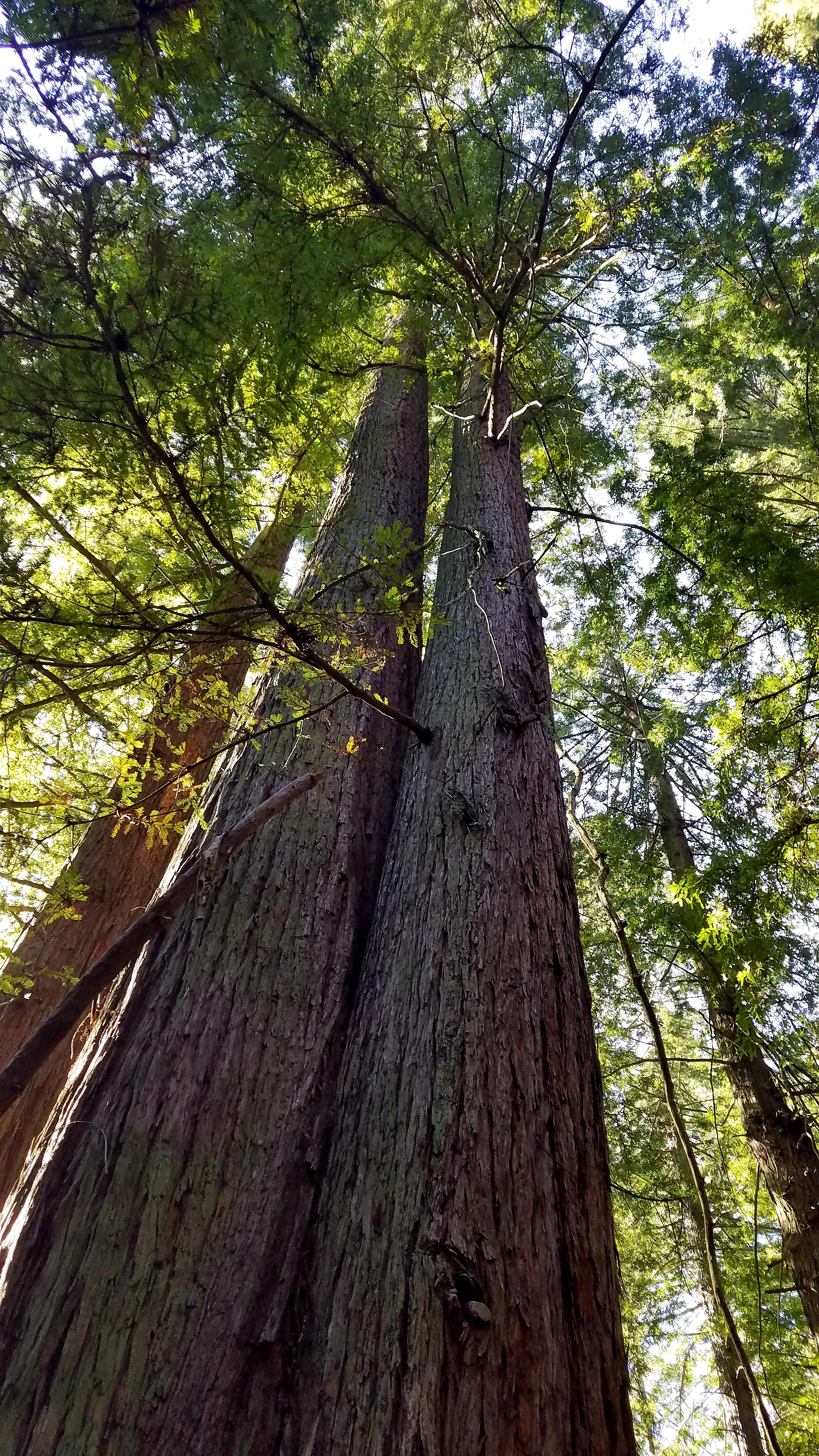
Looking up at coast redwood trees in LandPaths Grove of Old Trees

LandPaths or Land Partners through stewardship is an organization formed in 1996 to foster a love of the land in Sonoma County, California. The organization owns open space preserves throughout Sonoma County, and encourages outdoor experiences where people can learn to understand and appreciate natural environments.

== Locations ==
- Andy’s Unity Park Community Garden in southwest Santa Rosa, California
- Bayer Farm in the Roseland neighborhood of Santa Rosa
- Rancho Mark West learning environment with organic garden, historic barn, creek, and demonstration forest in the hills above Santa Rosa
- Bohemia Ecological Preserve 1,000 acres (400 ha) in the western hills of Occidental, California
- Grove of Old Trees 48 acres (19 ha) west of Occidental
- Calvi Ranch 69 acres (28 ha) coastal prairie west of Occidental
- Ocean Song 800 acres (320 ha) in western Sonoma County
- Riddell Preserve 400 acres (160 ha) of diverse habitat above the west Dry Creek valley in Healdsburg, California
- Fitch Mountain 173 acres (70 ha) open space preserve on Fitch Mountain, owned by the City of Healdsburg and stewarded by LandPaths
- Healdsburg Ridge Open Space Preserve 150 acres (61 ha) of wetlands, oak woodlands, chaparral, and grasslands owned by the City of Healdsburg and stewarded by LandPaths

== Activities ==
LandPaths' public outings visit and enjoy the open spaces, farms and parks-in-development that have been protected by Sonoma County Agricultural Preservation and Open Space District. The LandPaths outdoor day camp provides Santa Rosa elementary school students the opportunity to engage in nature walks, hikes, journaling, and observations of natural processes, plant life, and animal life in local open spaces. LandPaths' Owl Camp host hundreds of children aged 6 to 13 each summer at Rancho Mark West. Older children are encouraged to participate in kayaking and backpacking Treks for Teens. Teenagers are encouraged to become stewards of the land removing invasive plants, repairing trails, helping to reduce fire risks, planting oaks, and cleaning up creeks.
