= Killing of Bich Cau Thi Tran =

Shooting of a Vietnamese immigrant by the police in California

- Undated photograph of Trần, provided by family following her death
- Date: July 13, 2003
- Time: 9:00 p.m.
- Location: East Taylor Street, San Jose, California, U.S.
- Participants: Trần Thị Bích Câu (death); Chad Marshall and Tom Mun (officers)
- Deaths: Trần Thị Bích Câu
- Litigation: Bích Câu's family awarded $1.8 million from lawsuit filed against the city of San Jose

The killing of Bich Cau Thi Tran (also known incorrectly as Cau Bich Tran) occurred in San Jose, California, on July 13, 2003. She was fatally shot by a San Jose Police officer in her home. Bích Câu was wielding an Asian vegetable peeler at two police officers and was then shot once in the chest. The incident led to protests from the Vietnamese American community in San Jose, accusing the officer of using excessive force. Her family was awarded $1.8 million in a lawsuit filed against the city of San Jose.

== Background ==
Bích Câu was a 25-year-old Vietnamese immigrant who spoke little English. She was born Trần Thị Bích Câu in Vietnam on May 2, 1978, the first child of Trần Mạnh Kim and Nguyễn Thị Hoàng. She immigrated to the United States in 1997, taking a job at the NUMMI assembly plant in Fremont, California. She was the mother of two boys, then 2 and 4 years old, with whom she lived with in an apartment, along with her boyfriend Đăng Quang Bùi. She was 4 feet 9 inches (145 cm) tall and weighed 98 pounds (44 kg). She had a history of mental health problems and had stopped taking anti psychotic medication. Bích Câu had at least nine interactions with police from 2001 to 2003 due to mental health issues and outbursts, and had been hospitalized at least three times for mental health issues.

The two officers, Chad Marshall and Tom Mun, were employed by the San Jose Police Department. Marshall, then 30 years old, had four years of law enforcement experience, while Mun had two and a half years of experience.

== Shooting ==
At 6:00 p.m., Bích Câu was heard and seen by neighbors yelling in Vietnamese and waving her arms while roaming around the streets of their neighborhood. According to a neighbor, Bích Câu was "marching zombielike down the sidewalk" and ignoring her youngest son, who was wandering in traffic at the intersection of Taylor and 12th Streets crying and asking for "his mommy." The neighbor told her to "go take care of your little babies," and Bích Câu's boyfriend Bùi took her into their family's home and drew the blinds. The neighbor phoned the police to report the wandering toddler, which prompted a dispatch to the scene to check on the welfare of the toddler.

Bùi stated in an interview that the family had been living in the duplex for approximately three months; because the weather was hot, the sons often ran outside to the front yard. A neighbor previously had reported the children running outside unattended, prompting a prior visit from a police officer more than a week before the shooting. Bùi later testified that Bích Câu had exhibited symptoms of mental illness after their second child was born in 2000, but would often stop taking her anti-psychotic medication because it made her tired. Bùi related several incidents that occurred in 2001 requiring police responses to Bích Câu's actions.

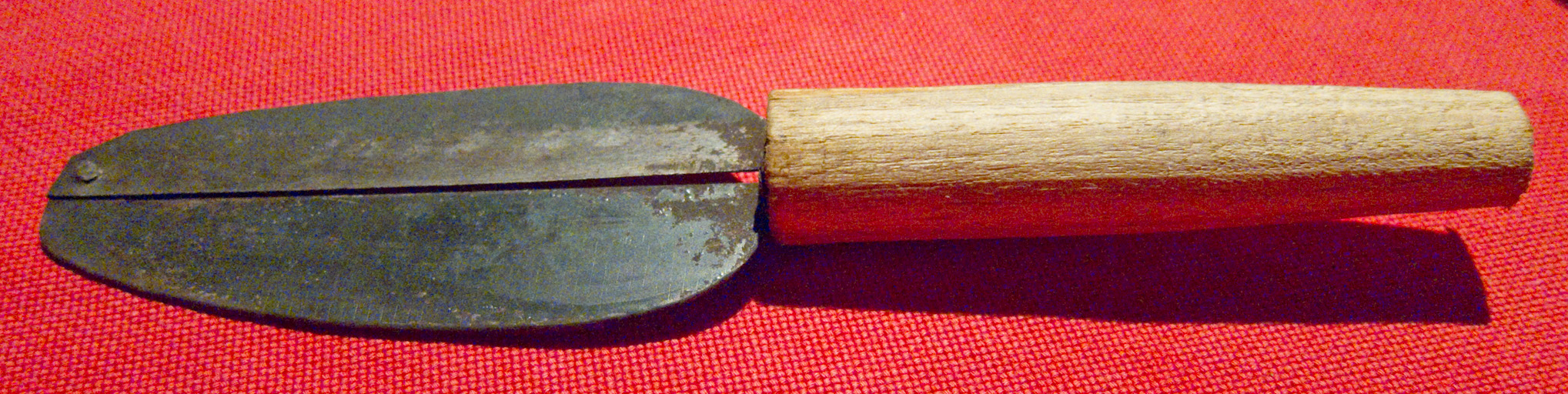
A Vietnamese-style vegetable peeler

While officers were en route, Bích Câu was heard by neighbors screaming in her home, prompting more calls to the police as a suspected domestic violence issue. According to Bùi, that night someone called the house to let them know the boys were outside again unsupervised and Bích Câu called Bùi to help; Bùi was outside and did not respond. Because the bedroom door was locked, she assumed he was inside the bedroom ignoring her and grew angry after she tried unsuccessfully to pry open the door with a vegetable peeler. Bích Câu then called 9-1-1 to help, but the operator advised her it was not an emergency situation and she should hire a locksmith. Instead, she went outside and broke the window, then asked a neighbor for a boost into the bedroom after Bùi refused to help.

Two officers arrived on scene in separate patrol cars. Officer Chad Marshall and Officer Tom Mun arrived at the East Taylor Street duplex where she lived with her boyfriend and the couple's two sons. The officers heard Bích Câu acting distraught and pounding and screaming inside. The officers stated they pounded on the door for several minutes, and Mun asked Marshall if they should break it down. Bích Câu's boyfriend Bùi then opened the door and pointed the officers to the kitchen, where Bích Câu was, stating that "she's crazy." Bùi disputes this sequence, saying that they were surprised by the loud knocking at 8:30 p.m. and that after he opened the door a crack to see who it was, an armed police officer pushed the door open and entered the house. Bích Câu was holding a 10-inch-long (250 mm) Asian vegetable peeler, a dao bào, which had a 6-inch (150 mm) blade and was standing about 5 to 7 feet (1.5 to 2.1 m) away from the officers.

Initial police reports stated that after police entered the duplex, Bích Câu screamed at the officers to get out, and when they did not, she retrieved what looked like a cleaver out of a drawer and waved it at them. Again, Bích Câu's family disputed that account, saying that she had already been gesturing angrily with the utensil within the kitchen before officers arrived, as she had been employing it to try to pry the locked bedroom door open. Mun would later testify that she screamed at the officers to go away while shaking the raised blade, which Mun said appeared to be a kitchen knife. Mun believed she was about to throw the blade at either the officers, Bùi, or the couple's two sons, all standing nearby. A knife expert would testify later the peeler "would have been able to cut a piece of meat". Marshall described the knife as a cleaver and said he thought she was raising it over her head in preparation to throw it at him. Within three or "seven to eight" seconds of entering the apartment, Marshall responded by firing one gunshot into Bích Câu's chest, killing her. According to Bùi's testimony, the police officer (Marshall) only said "Hey, hey, hey" before shooting and did not warn Bích Câu or demand that she drop the weapon before opening fire, although Mun said Marshall twice ordered Bích Câu to "drop the knife."

Officer Christopher Hardin responded to the scene just as the shooting occurred. He entered the apartment immediately after hearing gunfire, and described what he saw: Bích Câu was lying on her back, "slowly shifting her head and limbs and gasping for breath" with Marshall's eyes "very large ... [looking] sad and scared at the same time" as her sons were "screaming and clutching onto [Marshall's] legs." A responding paramedic, Maria Rios, testified that her dispatchers told her to wait outside the apartment for six minutes while police "secured" the scene. Rios would pronounce Bích Câu dead fifteen minutes after the shooting. A pathologist, Dr. Richard Mason, testified the shot had pierced her heart, leaving a fatal wound. The damage was so massive that emergency medical treatment would have been ineffective, even if the paramedics had not been delayed from entering the apartment.

== Investigation ==
The Santa Clara County District Attorney's office held a criminal grand jury of 18 members to decide on whether or not Marshall should be indicted for the shooting death. The grand jury hearing was held publicly at the request of Santa Clara County District Attorney George Kennedy and the grand jury foreman to "... help eliminate any public concern or mistrust about the case." Santa Clara County Deputy District's Attorney Dan Nishigaya provided evidence to the grand jury over a two-week span. Nishigaya asked the officers why they did not choose to use pepper spray or other nonlethal tactics to subdue Bích Câu, and Tom Mun testified that the incident "happened too quickly" and that it appeared to be an imminent threat that endangered the lives of the two officers and Bích Câu's relatives.

During the presentation of testimony, grand jurors would ask why police kept referring to the vegetable peeler as a knife, and Nishigaya admonished a crime scene investigator for calling Bích Câu "the suspect." A police training instructor, Officer Alan Soroka, brandished a training knife in response to a grand juror's question why the police did not shoot at the weapon instead. Soroka was attempting to demonstrate how difficult it would be to shoot the knife from an attacker's hand to explain why police are trained to shoot at the attacker's torso and not the weapon, but observers in the courtroom felt the testimony was highly prejudicial as the instructor was wielding a combat-style training knife. Other police training instructors testified to the danger of any edged tool, stating that a charging attacker could stab an officer within 1.5 seconds from a distance of 7 yards (6.4 m).

On October 30, 2003, the grand jury declined to indict Marshall after two hours of deliberation on charges of either manslaughter or murder in Bích Câu's death after a seven-day proceeding.

Bích Câu's family filed a civil lawsuit on November 12, 2003, against the city of San Jose, Officer Chad Marshall, and the San Jose Chief of Police, alleging wrongful death. The lawsuit also accused the police department of attempting to deflect blame by exaggerating the nature of the Tran's "weapon" (the police had called it a "large cleaver") and increasing the time elapsed between entering the apartment and the shooting (the police had said 55 seconds elapsed). In 2005, Tran's family was awarded $1,825,000. $800,000 of it went to Bích Câu's sons. According to San Jose Attorney Rick Doyle, the city wanted to avoid a "drawn-out case" and make sure her sons would be provided for.

== Reaction ==
Bích Câu was buried on August 2, 2003, at Oak Hill Memorial Park. The Bích Câu Trần Memorial Fund was established in her memory.

The shooting lead to many protests organized by Vietnamese community leaders and immigrant activists, and distrust from some of the Vietnamese community leaders and citizens in the San Jose area, stating that the shooting was a result of excessive force. Three days after she was killed, 300 protesters marched from her apartment to the San Jose City Hall.

A vigil with 400 people was held for Bích Câu within days of the shooting, notable as one of the first responses by the Vietnamese-American community to issues in America, as opposed to anti-communist activism targeting Vietnam.

The shooting led to the formation of the Coalition for Justice and Accountability, founded by Richard Konda, a director of the Asian Law Alliance. It was an organization that sought for justice in the case and demanded the San Jose Police Department to be culturally sensitive and adopt nonlethal tactics for subduing mentally disturbed people. The organization held multiple protests at the San Jose City Hall and in November 2003, after the grand jury declined to indict Chad Marshall, the ethnically diverse group called for a federal investigation of Bích Câu's killing, contending that her history of interactions with the police, where she was angry yet remained nonviolent, illustrated that police were too quick to perceive ethnic minorities as inherently more threatening.

On August 11, 2015, Governor Jerry Brown signed Senate Bill 227 into law, making California the first state to ban the use of grand juries to indict officers facing charges for fatal shootings. The law effectively left the decision whether or not to present criminal charge(s) against officers involved in fatal shootings to the presiding district attorney.

== See also ==
- Shooting of Kuanchung Kao
