= Killing of Andy Lopez =

2013 fatal shooting of 13-year old boy in Santa Rosa, California

Shooting of Andy Lopez
- Undated family photo of Andy Lopez
- Date: October 22, 2013
- Time: c. 3:14 p.m. (PST)
- Location: Moorland Avenue and West Robles Avenue, Santa Rosa, California, United States; 38.394466°N 122.718555°W
- Participants: Erick Gelhaus (shooter); Andy Lopez (death)
- Deaths: Andy Lopez
- Charges: None filed
- Litigation: Lawsuit against Sonoma County and Gelhaus settled for $3 million

The fatal killing of Andy Lopez by Sonoma County sheriff's deputy Erick Gelhaus took place on October 22, 2013, in Santa Rosa, California. 13-year-old Lopez was walking through a vacant lot and carrying an airsoft gun that was designed to resemble an AK-47 assault rifle. Gelhaus opened fire on Lopez, presumably mistaking the airsoft gun for a real firearm. The shooting prompted many protests in Santa Rosa, and throughout California.

On November 4, 2013, the Lopez family filed a federal civil rights lawsuit at the U.S. District Court.

On July 7, 2014, District Attorney Jill Ravitch announced no charges would be filed against Gelhaus. On July 1, 2015, the FBI announced no criminal charges would be filed against Gelhaus, due to lack of evidence to prove that he violated Lopez's civil rights.

== Backgrounds ==
Andy Lopez (June 2, 2000 – October 22, 2013) was a 13-year-old boy who attended Cook Middle School in Santa Rosa. He was raised in the Moorland Avenue neighborhood in southwest Santa Rosa. He transferred to Lewis Opportunity School from Cook Middle School one week prior to his death.

Erick Gelhaus is a Sonoma County sheriff's deputy, and has worked with the agency for 24 years. He is also an Iraq War veteran. Gelhaus is a firearms instructor and is a contributing writer to gun publications. He began instructing in 2001 at Gunsite Academy, an Arizona-based company that teaches gun-handling, marksmanship, and law enforcement to "elite military personnel, law enforcement officers and free citizens of the U.S," and is listed as active as of 2022 He specialized in teaching pistol, carbine, shotgun and rifle lessons. He accidentally shot himself in the leg in 1995 while on duty with the sheriff's office, reportedly while holstering a gun during an attempt at searching a teenager for weapons. In his 24 years in law enforcement, he had never shot a suspect until the shooting of Lopez.

== Shooting ==
According to Santa Rosa Police Lieutenant Paul Henry, two Sonoma County sheriff's deputies (Gelhaus and Michael Schemmel; Schemmel was driving the patrol car) were patrolling the Moorland Avenue neighborhood when they spotted Andy Lopez approximately 25 yards (23 m) ahead carrying an airsoft replica of an AK-47 assault rifle while he was walking on Moorland, just past the corner of West Robles Avenue. The rifle appeared to be a real weapon, since its orange tip had been previously broken off. As the sheriff's deputies approached the child from behind, Gelhaus radioed an observation of "Code 20, two units" at 3:13:58 p.m. Schemmel activated the light bar and briefly sounded the siren as he parked the patrol vehicle, and Gelhaus exited the passenger's side, calling out to demand that Lopez drop the weapon. Lopez turned to his right, towards the deputies and the barrel allegedly began to ascend.

At 3:14 p.m., Gelhaus fired eight shots at Lopez from his department-issued 9mm handgun. The deputies broadcast "shots fired" to dispatch at 3:14:17 p.m., indicating the total time from initial contact to the shooting was seventeen seconds. By Gelhaus's own testimony, he opened fire "a couple seconds" after issuing the command for Lopez to drop the airsoft gun. Seven bullets hit Andy within six seconds. Two of the shots delivered fatal wounds, with one round hitting Lopez on his side while he was turning to face the police, at least four entering from the rear, according to an autopsy. The deputies remained in defensive position until backups arrived, then approached Lopez with guns drawn; after separating the airsoft gun from Lopez he was handcuffed. He was pronounced dead by medical personnel on the scene. Lopez was found to be under the influence of marijuana after an autopsy.

The missing orange tip is a US legal requirement for all toy guns for import. However, airsoft and pellet rifles are exempted from the marking requirements. It is also a violation of California law to "openly display or expose any imitation firearm in a public place unless the entire exterior surface of the imitation firearm is painted with a specified color". The 13 year old friend from whom Lopez had borrowed the replica later reported that he felt responsible "because he allowed Andy to borrow the gun even though the orange tip of the barrel was broken off making it look real, although he'd told his friend not to take it since it was broken."

== Investigation ==
On October 26, 2013, the Federal Bureau of Investigation started to conduct an independent investigation in Lopez's death. Sonoma County Sheriff Steve Freitas announced in a statement on October 25 that he would cooperate fully with federal investigators. It is the first time the FBI has investigated an officer-involved shooting in Sonoma County since the 1997 shooting death of Kuanchung Kao in Rohnert Park.

Investigators said Gelhaus feared for the safety of himself and his partner, and had to make an immediate decision to shoot when Lopez turned around and allegedly began raising the apparent assault weapon in their direction. The gun was later found to be an AK-47 replica air-soft pellet gun with the orange barrel tip marking broken off. Gelhaus was in a deputy sheriff's uniform and marked sheriff's patrol car; however, Lopez would not have seen the uniform or patrol car since the officers approached him from behind;

In the autopsy, Lopez was found to have significant levels of THC in his blood, consistent with smoking marijuana 60 to 75 minutes previously; he was also found to have a joint in his pocket. 'A 13-year-old boy high on marijuana would likely have suffered "impaired judgment, slowed decision making and increased mental processing time, particularly when having to deal with performance of a sudden, unanticipated tasks, including decisions that needed to be quickly responded to.'"

Gelhaus was cleared to return to duty on December 9, 2013, but was able to work at his desk and not on patrol. On July 7, 2014, District Attorney Jill Ravitch announced no charges would be filed against Gelhaus. In August 2014, Gelhaus was allowed to return to patrolling the streets.

The district attorney, Jill Ravich, referred the completed investigative report to the Sonoma County Grand Jury, but the civil Grand Jury declined to review it, citing lack of expertise.

On July 1, 2015, the U.S. Department of Justice announced that it would not file criminal charges of violating one's civil rights against Gelhaus. According to a Justice Department spokesman, the decision to not file charges against Gelhaus was due to insufficient evidence that he willfully used excessive force that resulted in Lopez's death. A group of federal prosecutors and FBI agents reviewed the case and determine there was a lack of evidence Gelhaus violated Andy Lopez's civil rights.

== Aftermath ==
=== Civil action ===
Arnoldo Casillas, the lawyer representing Lopez's family, said that the shooting was unconstitutional because it violated the Fourth Amendment's limits on police authority. On November 4, the Lopez family filed a lawsuit at the U.S. District Court in San Francisco, claiming that Deputy Erick Gelhaus shot Lopez "without reasonable cause."

The civil action trial was initially scheduled to start in April 2016. In February 2016, the trial was delayed by Sonoma County's challenge to the January ruling by U.S. District Court Judge Phyllis Jean Hamilton that allowed the case brought by the parents of Andy Lopez to go forward. Hamilton had dismissed three of the five claims that Gelhaus violated Lopez's civil rights but said she would leave it to a jury to decide whether he acted unreasonably. Steven Mitchell, the attorney who would have defended Sonoma County in the federal lawsuit filed by Lopez's parents, committed suicide two weeks after the decision to delay the case was made.

On June 25, 2018, the U.S. Supreme Court denied Sonoma County's petition, clearing the way for the case against the Sonoma County sheriff's deputy to proceed toward a trial. In December 2018, the lawsuit was settled for $3 million.

=== Protests ===
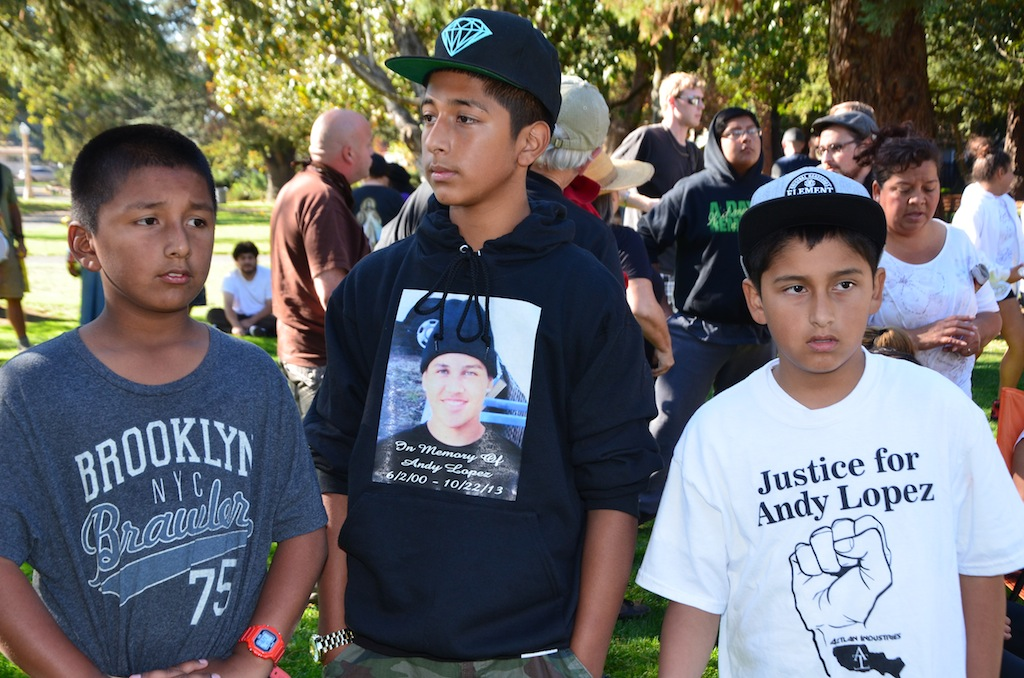
"Justice 4 Andy" rally in Santa Rosa, California, November 09, 2013

A series of protests were organized and held following Lopez's death. The protests were mainly organized by immigrant, religious and community groups and activists. Many protesters have stated that Lopez's shooting was a case of police brutality, and that Lopez, who was Latino, was a victim of racial profiling by the deputies. On October 25, 2013, more than 100 people, consisting mostly of middle school and high school students, protested at the Santa Rosa City Hall. On October 29, over 1,000 people attended a protest in downtown Santa Rosa, in the form of a mass march. The march initiated in the Courthouse Square in downtown Santa Rosa, and ended at the Sonoma County Sheriff's Office. Lawyer John Burris, who represented the family of police shooting victim Oscar Grant, gave a speech at the rally. Attendees traveled from all over the San Francisco Bay Area to attend the event. Many protesters held picket signs demanding justice. Up to 200 people attended a march in Santa Rosa on November 5, 2013, including activist Cindy Sheehan. They also demanded that District Attorney Jill Ravitch issue an arrest warrant for Gelhaus or put together a grand jury, but she declined to do either until the fact gathering investigation was complete, stating that the investigation would take time.

Rallies were held statewide on November 9, 2013, in Santa Rosa, Oakland, San Francisco, Los Angeles, Sacramento, and Merced.

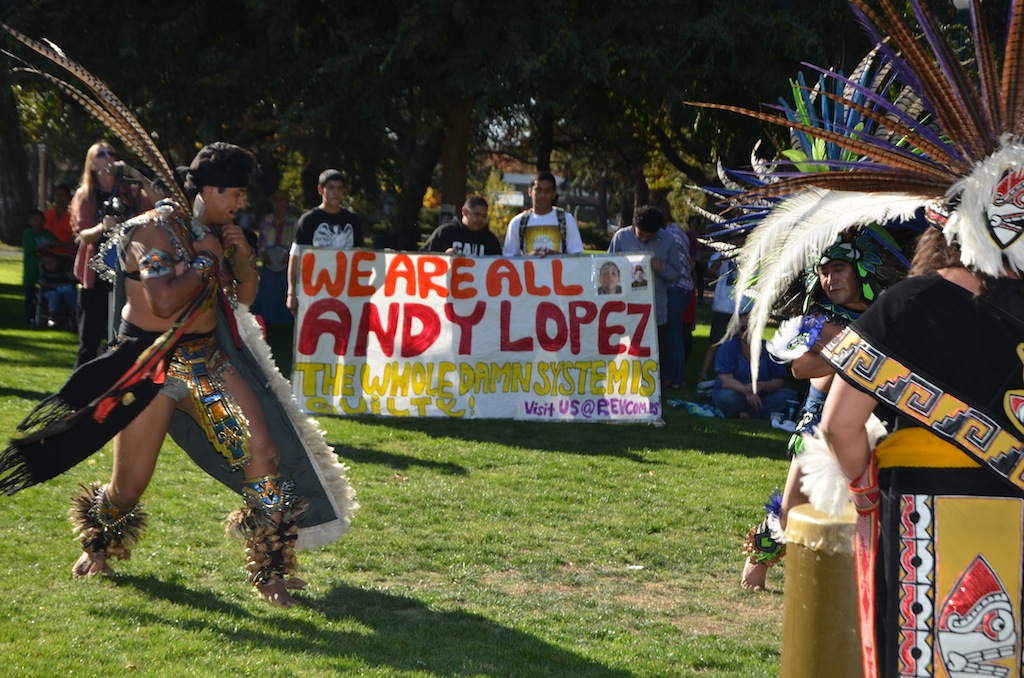
2013 "Justice 4 Andy" rally

On November 26, 2013, several people were detained during protests in Santa Rosa. A dozen demonstrators were cited for blocking traffic, and one demonstrator was arrested and booked for resisting arrest. There were 80 people attending that protest, consisting of local middle and high-school students, and several members of By Any Means Necessary (BAMN), a Bay Area-based civil rights group.

On December 3, 2013, protesters targeted Ravitch at her re-election fundraiser.

On December 9, 2013, Gelhaus was cleared to return to duty, which resulted in additional protests.

A 31-year-old man was arrested for battery on a police officer for allegedly punching a police officer and hitting another officer with a picket sign during a protest at the Santa Rosa City Hall on December 10, 2013. Charges were dropped against him in May 2014. A second person was arrested for obstructing a police officer and violating probation. Multiple protesters vandalized the front door of the Sonoma County Jail, breaking its glass.

On February 17, 2014, protesters for Andy Lopez gathered at the Santa Rosa Plaza food court to eat lunch while wearing shirts displaying "RIP Andy Lopez". Several mall security guards came up to them and asked them to remove their T-shirts or leave the mall. The attorney for Simon Malls, owner of Santa Rosa Plaza, apologized in a letter issued to relatives of Andy Lopez, stating that they were disappointed that the security guards did not comply with the mall's policies and procedures. The head of security for Santa Rosa Plaza was fired one month later in connection with the incident.

On July 12, 2014, more than 100 protesters held a rally at the Old Courthouse Square in Santa Rosa, demonstrating their disapproval with prosecutors' decision to not file charges against Erick Gelhaus. A small group of protesters marched onto northbound Highway 101, blocking traffic.

On June 2, 2020, a memorial and march was held in Santa Rosa in Lopez’s honor, on what would have been his 20th birthday, and coinciding with the George Floyd protests.

=== Tributes ===
A memorial park was created for Lopez in December 2013, located near the site of his death.

In March 2016, the Sonoma County Board of Supervisors approved an additional $1.2 million of fund money for the park and a name for it. The park is named "Andy's Unity Park" and encompasses 4.22 acres. The park's estimated cost was $4 million, with $3 million for the construction. The park was opened in June 2018 with a final cost of $3.7 million. LandPaths, a Sonoma county non-profit, helped create Andy’s Unity Park Community Garden and maintains the park along with community involvement.

== See also ==
- List of killings by law enforcement officers in the United States, October 2013
- Police misconduct
- Shooting of Michael Brown and the subsequent 2014 Ferguson unrest
- Shooting of Tamir Rice
- Shooting of Akai Gurley
- Shooting of John Crawford III
- Shooting of Ezell Ford
- Death of William Corey Jackson
- Shooting of Kuanchung Kao
- Death of Eric Garner
- Entertech shooting deaths
- Emmett Till
