= Grove of Old Trees =

Reserve of redwoods in California

- IUCN category V (protected landscape/seascape)
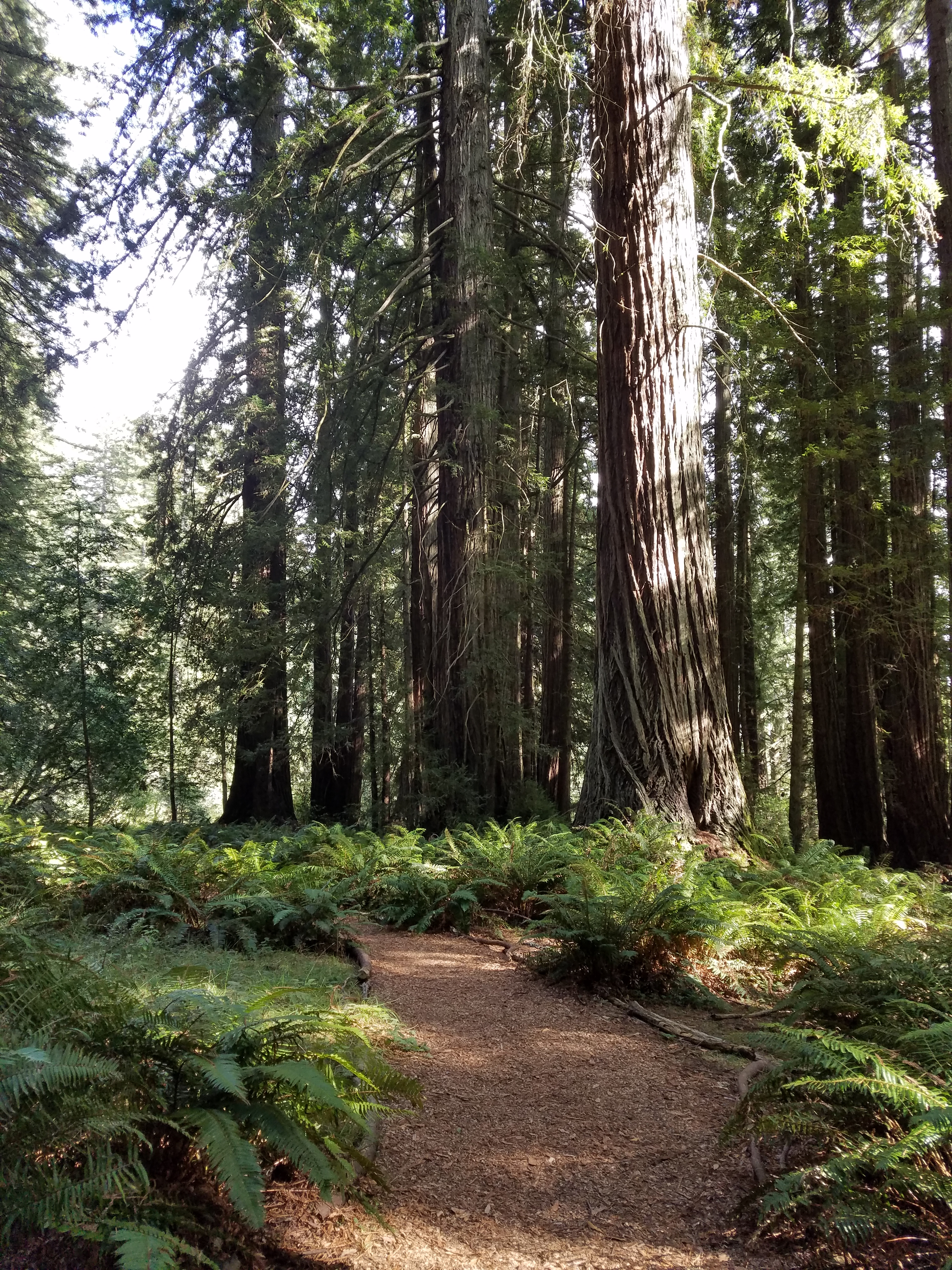
- Hiking trail through Grove of Old Trees

- Location within California Location within the United States
- Location: Sonoma County, California
- Nearest city: Occidental, CA
- Coordinates: 38°23′57″N 122°59′27″W
- Area: 48 acres (19 ha)
- Established: 2000
- Governing body: LandPaths

The Grove of Old Trees is a 48-acre (19 ha) open space reserve forest of mostly second growth coast redwood trees on a broad, flat ridgetop west of Occidental, California.

== Location ==
Stewarded and owned by LandPaths for more than 20 years, the Grove of Old Trees is a healthy, old-growth stand of Coast Redwood (Sequoia sempervirens) Accessible only via a narrow, one-lane rural road, the Grove is tucked away in a neighborhood on a road used by neighbors for walking and biking.

Through traffic and parking surveys and neighborhood feedback, it's been found that the Grove of Old Tree's tiny parking lot is highly impacted by visitors on major holidays, creating traffic and parking congestion.

To protect the beloved redwoods in the Grove and to minimize parking issues reservations are now required to park at the Grove during times of high use, including all major holidays.

Please note that there is just one small parking lot at the Grove of Old Trees. This is for the safety of you, your family, and the neighborhood.

There are no signs on the roads leading to the grove or on the trails within the grove. Cautious drivers on this single lane road will find a small turnout with a wooden archway on the right. There is only one small parking lot. LandPaths maintains a system of free, publicly accessible trails with some suitable for wheelchairs and strollers. There is a picnic table near the west end of the grove, but there are no bathroom facilities or trash containers. Dogs must be kept on a leash within the grove.

== Visiting the Grove of Old Trees ==
Reservations are required on the following major holidays during open hours. Those without a reservation will be asked to come back on another day. You can make a registration by going to the Grove of Old Trees page on the LandPaths website.

- Memorial Day – Monday, May 29
- Independence Day – Tuesday, July 4
- Labor Day – Monday, September 4
- Thanksgiving Day - Thursday November 23
- Christmas Day - Monday December 25

== History ==
Originally the area was part of the ancestral home of the Coast Miwok and Southern Pomo Indigenous peoples.

Following European colonization, the grove was owned by the Coleman and Van Alstyne families. Those families preserved a few old-growth forest trees for family gatherings while the surrounding forests were converted to lumber.

In the 1990s, remnant old growth redwoods were slated to be cut down as part of a timber harvest plan. County residents launched a campaign to protect the grove. Subsequently, LandPaths purchased the grove in 2000 with the assistance of the Sonoma County Agricultural Preservation and Open Space District, the Save the Redwoods League, the California Coastal Conservancy, and private individuals.

Sonoma Ag and Open Space holds a Forever Wild conservation easement on the property, which mandates zero take of trees .

== Ecology ==
The grove is mostly second-growth redwoods with a tanoak understory and sword fern ground cover. The few surviving old-growth redwoods on this ridgetop location are smaller than those found on valley floors.
