= Ocean Song =

Nature preserve in California

Coordinates: 38.40173°N 123.02262°W

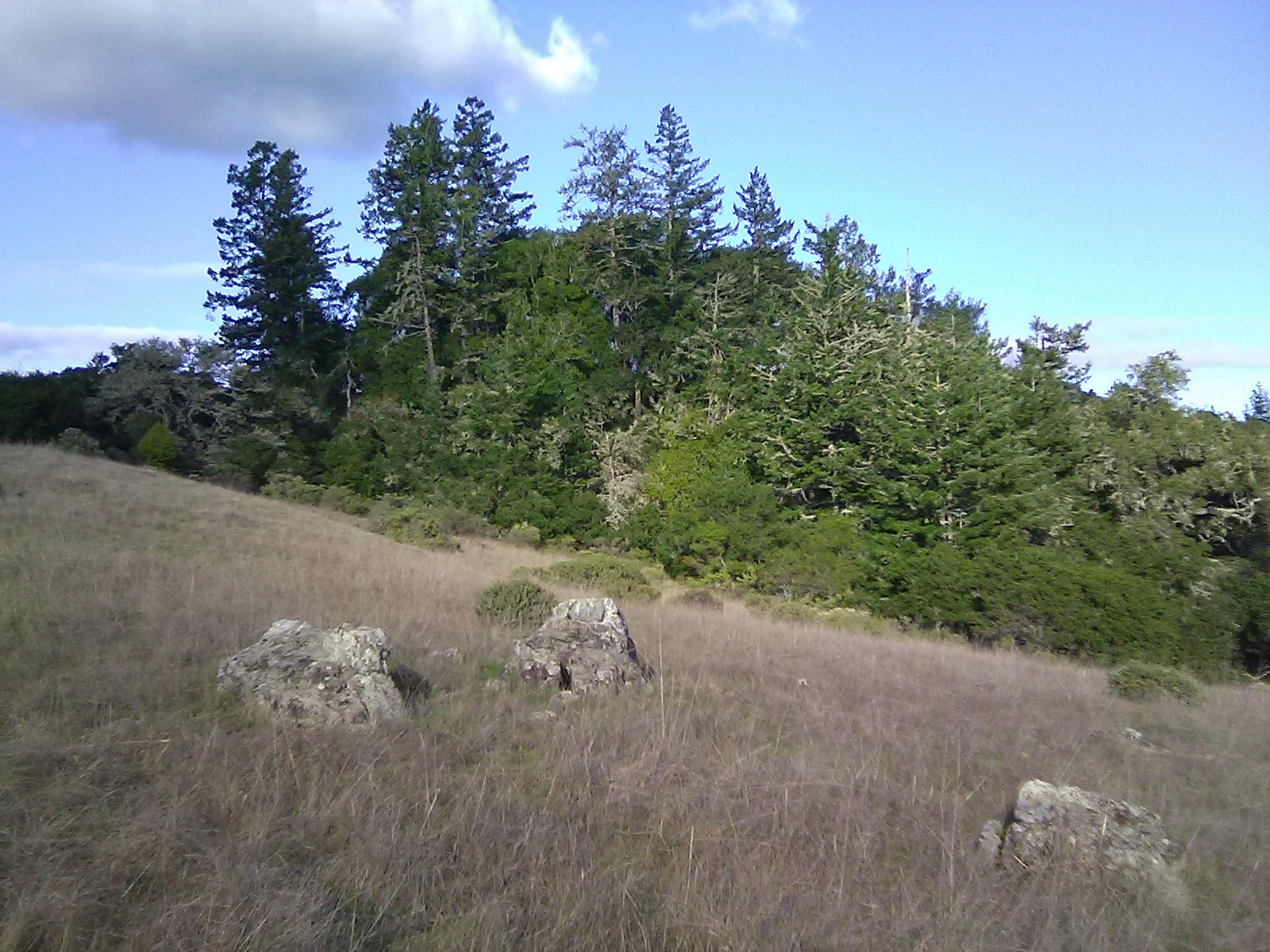
Typical ridge top grassland and woodland on Ocean Song preserve

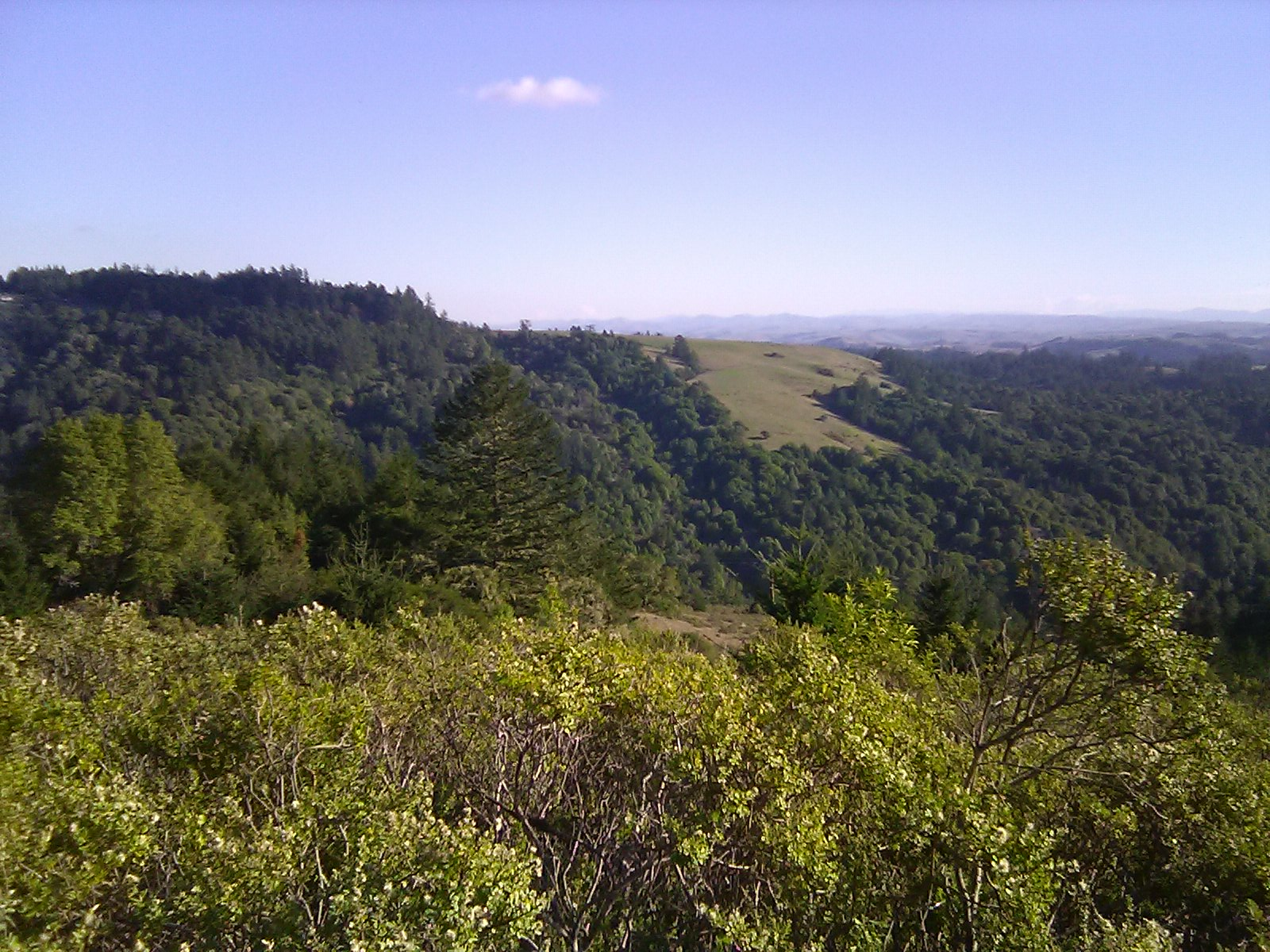
View from Ocean Song ridge top

Ocean Song is a ridge-top preserve overlooking the Pacific coast in western Sonoma County, California. The preserve encompasses approximately 800 acres (320 ha) of grasslands with mixed oak woodlands. Since acquiring the property in 2019, LandPaths has been cleaning up old buildings and restoring the environment for native species. LandPaths intends to restore Ocean Song's use for nature-based education, but the preserve was not open to public access by 2023.

== History ==
Ocean Song is part of the California Coast Ranges within the historic territory of the Coast Miwok and Southern Pomo people. The land was used for sheep ranching following European colonization. Ocean Song was purchased in 1975 by Pieter and Marya Myers, who built homes and structures in partnership with the Ānanda spiritual community. A conservation easement was established in 1986 to protect 240 acres (97 ha) from development. Discovery Day Camp was providing environmental education to Sonoma County school children by 1991. The camp was revitalized as Coyote Camp from 2005 to 2017. The adjacent Myers property was added to the preserve in 2020 with California Department of Fish and Wildlife funds under the state's Proposition 1 and Proposition 68 grant programs for ecosystem restoration and protection projects. The expanded preserve is adjacent to the Willow Creek portion of Sonoma Coast State Park with the possibility of an 8-mile (13 km) trail connecting the preserve to the Pacific coast at Shell Beach.
