= Open space reserve =

Conserved land or water

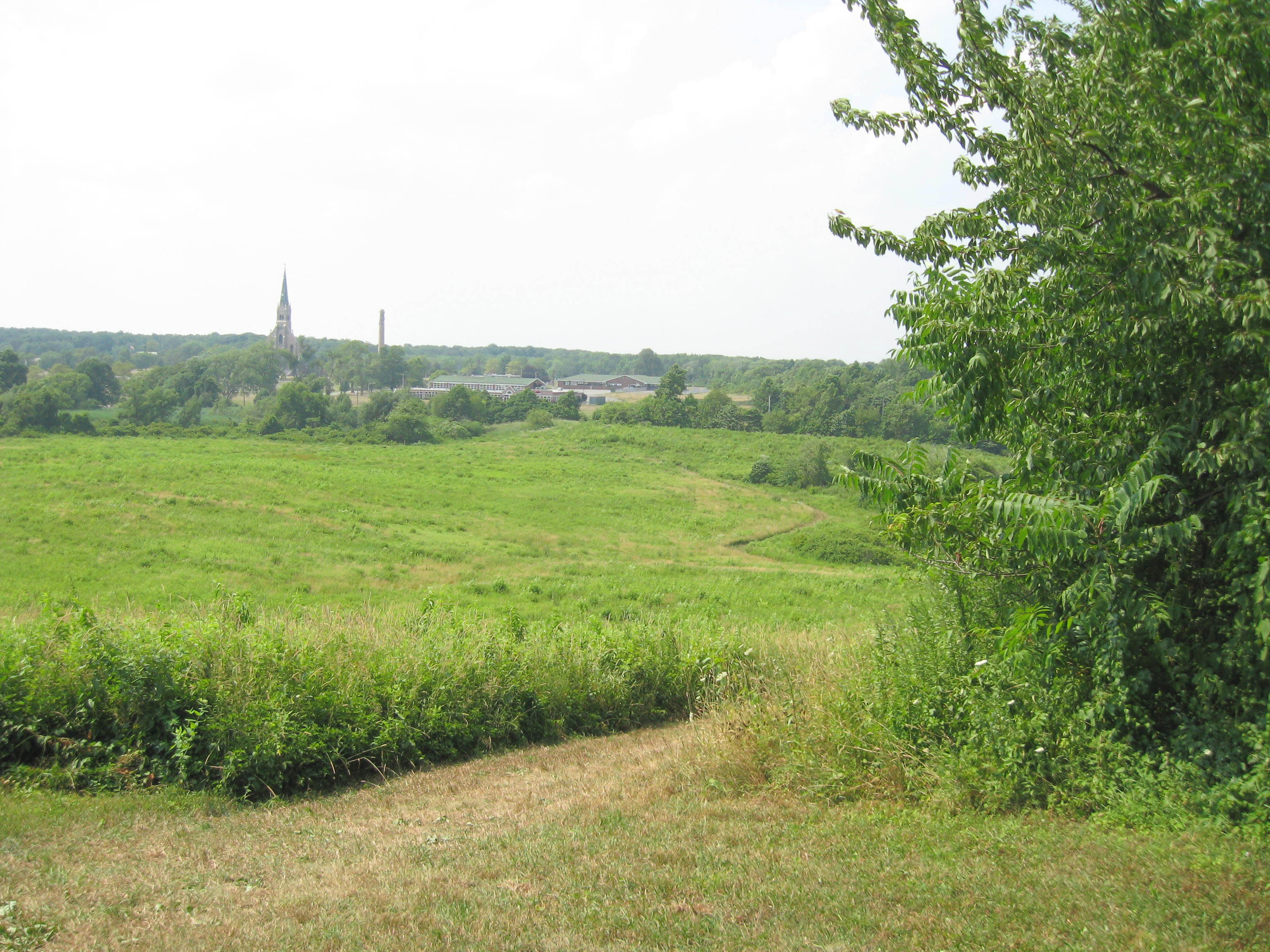
Mount Loretto Unique Area, New York City.

An open space reserve (also called open space preserve, open space reservation, and green space) is an area of protected or conserved land or water on which development is indefinitely set aside.

The purpose of an open space reserve may include the preservation or conservation of a community or region's rural natural or historic character; the conservation or preservation of a land or water area for the sake of recreational, ecological, environmental, aesthetic, or agricultural interests; or the management of a community or region's growth in terms of development, industry, or natural resources extraction. Open space reserves may be urban, suburban, or rural; they may be actual designated areas of land or water, or they may be zoning districts or overlays where development is limited or controlled to create undeveloped areas of land or water within a community or region. They may be publicly owned or owned by non-profit or private interests.

A certain amount of overlap occurs with similar planning and conservation terms. Protected areas are open space reserves in which certain resources indigenous to the landscape are protected as opposed to conserved. Urban open space specifically refers to open space reserves within an urban setting; such may include natural landscapes or manicured urban parkland.

== Greenways ==
Greenways are linear open space reserves, linear corridors that span interconnected open space reserves, or linear chains of connected open space reserves. A green belt is a general area of open space surrounding an urban area. Green infrastructure is the total mass and viability of undeveloped, natural, and agricultural land and waterways, protected or not protected, within a particular community or region. Nature reserves and wildlife refuges are areas of open space set aside for the sake of protecting non-human species. National parks, state parks, and municipal parks, recreation areas, and reservations are types of open space reserves managed by government agencies for the primary purpose of passive or active human enjoyment. National forests, state forests, and municipal forests are types of open space reserves set aside for the primary purpose of forest conservation.

== Flood control ==
Flood control projects and protected ecological research areas may also be considered open space reserves secondary to their primary purpose.

== Distributation ==
There is growing evidence that open space is unequally distributed based on race and class, particularly in the US state of California, leading to concerns regarding Open Space Accessibility in California and other areas.

== Examples ==
- Arastradero Preserve near Palo Alto, California, USA
- Grove of Old Trees near Occidental, California, USA
- Upper Las Virgenes Canyon Open Space Preserve, Simi Hills, California, USA.

== See also ==
- Protected area
- Urban open space
- Greenway (landscape)
- Green infrastructure
- Green belt
- Greenfield land
- Nature reserve
