= Killing of Kuanchung Kao =

Shooting of a Californian by the police

- Kuanchung Kao, cropped from a family portrait
- Date: April 29, 1997
- Time: Approximately 2:15 a.m. (PST)
- Location: Maria Place, Rohnert Park, California, United States; 38.330170°N 122.679730°W
- Participants: Officer Jack Shields (shooter); Kuanchung Kao (death)
- Deaths: Kuanchung Kao
- Charges: None filed
- Litigation: Lawsuit (Kao v. Rohnert Park) settled for US$1 million

The killing of Kuanchung Kao occurred on April 29, 1997, in Rohnert Park, California. Kao was waving a wooden stick in the street in front of his driveway, prompting multiple 911 calls placed by Kao's neighbors. He was then fatally shot by public safety officer Jack Shields.

Kao's family filed a lawsuit against Rohnert Park which was settled for $1 million.

== Background ==
Kuanchung Kao (1963 or 1964 – April 29, 1997 (aged 33); Chinese: 高寬重; pinyin: Gāo Kuānzhòng) was a Taiwanese-born microbiologist working as a quality control engineer. He was married to Ayling Wu, a registered nurse, and they had three children together.

Officer Mike Lynch was the first police respondent on the scene. Officer Jack Shields was the second respondent, a 25-year veteran Rohnert Park public safety officer (the combined police and fire departments) at the time of the shooting in 1997. He had been promoted to police lieutenant soon after joining the force, and was later promoted to fire commander after serving more than twenty years as a police lieutenant. He was demoted to patrol officer after a year as fire commander after he was found guilty of falsifying time cards for other employees.

== Shooting ==
On the night of April 28, 1997, Kao was drinking at the Cotati Yacht Club in celebration of a new job. While at the bar, he was involved in two scuffles with at least one other bar patron. In the first, he corrected a patron by stating he was Chinese, not Japanese, to which the other patron responded by saying "You all look alike to me." The bartender, who was familiar with Kao, separated them by seating them at opposite ends of the bar.

The same patron later approached Kao and whispered some inflammatory words, instigating an altercation to which police were called. Kao was sent home in a taxicab by the bartender, who said the bar fight was inconsistent with Kao's usual behavior.

Upon arriving home, Kao stayed outside, crying "Neighbors, please help me!" Postmortem tests showed Kao's blood alcohol level was 0.23%. Neighbors called 911 to report a drunken disturbance at 2:11 a.m. Kao retrieved a 6 foot (1.8 m) wooden stick comparable to a closet rod from a motorhome parked in his driveway at around this time.

Four minutes later police officer Lynch arrived and stopped his patrol vehicle close to Kao in what witnesses felt was an attempt to scare him, but Kao hit the patrol car with the stick. Lynch backed the car away and remained in the car waiting for backup. Almost simultaneously, officer Shields arrived, training a spotlight on Kao and exiting his vehicle, despite Lynch radioing Shields to remain in his car. Shields later testified that he left the car to find Kao's wife Ayling Wu.

Lynch and Shields were in uniform and arrived in marked patrol cars with their sirens on but an eyewitness later stated neither of them identified themselves as police officers. When the officers arrived, Kao's wife Ayling Wu was outside trying to calm Kao and grab the stick. Shields commanded Wu to step away from Kao. She believed the officer would grab the stick but once she had retreated, Shields shot Kao once in the chest. Shields later testified that Kao charged him with the stick raised over his head in a striking posture, closing to within 3 feet (0.91 m). Four separate eyewitnesses contradicted Shields' testimony, saying that Kao was never closer to Shields than 10 feet (3.0 m). Kao was then handcuffed behind his back and left face down on his driveway to await paramedics. Ayling Wu, a trained medical professional, said she could see her husband breathing and tried to administer aid but was physically restrained by the officers and threatened with arrest. By the time paramedics arrived some ten minutes later Kao was dead. His body remained in the driveway until noon, and his 5-year-old daughter witnessed part of the disturbance.

Shields later testified that he feared for his life as Kao was waving the stick in "a threatening martial arts fashion." Kao never studied martial arts. A warrant executed the next day had police comb through Kao's house for evidence of martial arts training or paraphernalia. None was found.

== Legal actions ==
=== Sonoma County District Attorney ===
The Sonoma County Sheriff's Office conducted an investigation of the shooting and filed a 600-page report with the Sonoma County District Attorney's office in May 1997. On June 19, 1997, Sonoma County District Attorney Michael Mullins decided not to file criminal charges against Officer Jack Shields, concluding that Officer Shields had acted in self-defense. The California Attorney General's office investigated whether the decision not to prosecute was an abuse of discretion, concluding in a March 24, 1998 letter from Dan Lungren that deadly force was justified.

=== Rohnert Park ===
On August 5, 1997, the Rohnert Park Department of Public Safety ruled Officer Shields acted in accordance with departmental policies and procedures for the use of deadly force.

=== Federal Bureau of Investigation ===
The United States Attorney in San Francisco requested an FBI investigation of the shooting shortly after it occurred, on the suspicion that Kao's civil rights had been violated through the use of excessive force, which potentially could have led to a life sentence. Senator Barbara Boxer met with Ayling Wu and Nancy Wang on October 3, 1997; following the meeting Boxer stated she would relay concerns to the US Attorney. On January 28, 1998, US Attorney Michael Yamaguchi declined to file criminal charges against Officer Shields, citing insufficient evidence that Kuanchung Kao's civil rights were violated.

=== Civil suit ===
On October 1, 1997, John Burris and the Asian Law Caucus filed an administrative wrongful death claim, followed by the February 2, 1998 filing of a US$50 million federal suit against Rohnert Park, its Police Department, and the two officers involved. The suit was settled out-of-court for US$1 million in 2001 with no admission of liability.

== Aftermath ==
The shooting of Kuanchung Kao mobilized Asian-American activists to protest the perceived racial factors in his killing. Days after the August 1997 Rohnert Park investigation cleared Shields, on the 100-day anniversary of Kao's death, a vigil was held in San Francisco in part demanding a new investigation.

Activist pressure along with a growing trend of fatal police shootings in Sonoma County culminated in a United States Commission on Civil Rights investigation, which held a public hearing on February 20, 1998. Police and police supporters packed the meeting, forcing those with different viewpoints to stand outside the meeting room.

Kao's widow Ayling Wu and their three children moved to Orange County by 1998. Most of the lawsuit settlement was consumed by legal fees and moving expenses. Due to the challenges of raising 3 young children alone, Wu felt that she had no choice but to sell the family dog, a 3 year old fawn American Mastiff named Nala, which was purchased as a puppy by Kao for their daughter several years prior. Wu received temporary support with childcare from the family nanny, who assisted with the moving transition to Orange County for several months. All of Kao and Wu's extended families reside in Taiwan, and gradually ceased contact after Kao's death. Following the departure of the family nanny after the move south, Wu fell into a period of extreme depression and experienced suicidal thoughts, while struggling to make ends meet while also attempting to raise the children on her own. Wu's condition gradually improved over the years and led a moderately successful career as a Director of Nursing in medical rehabilitation facilities. One of the twins holds a career in physical therapy and the other twin is a wildland firefighter with a smokejumper specialization.

Jack Shields retired from the Rohnert Park Department of Public Safety in 2000 with over 30 years of service and moved to Hamlin, Texas, later becoming the mayor of Hamlin.

Mike Lynch left the Department of Public Safety within one year of the shooting, and was last known to be working in a local pet shop.

== See also ==
- Killing of Vincent Chin
- Shooting of Andy Lopez
- Shooting of Bich Cau Thi Tran
