= 2020–21 Minnesota Golden Gophers men's ice hockey season =

Big Ten Tournament, Champion NCAA Tournament, Regional final
- Conference: 2nd Big Ten
- Home ice: 3M Arena at Mariucci

Rankings
- USCHO: 7
- USA Today: 7

Record
- Overall: 24–7–0
- Conference: 16–6–0–0–0–0
- Home: 11–5–0
- Road: 9–1–0
- Neutral: 4–1–0

Coaches and captains
- Head coach: Bob Motzko
- Assistant coaches: Garrett Raboin; Ben Gordon; Paul Martin
- Captain: Sammy Walker
- Alternate captain(s): Jack LaFontaine; Brannon McManus; Ben Meyers

The 2020–21 Minnesota Golden Gophers men's ice hockey season was the 100th season of play for the program. They represented the University of Minnesota in the 2020–21 NCAA Division I men's ice hockey season. This season marked the 31st season in the Big Ten Conference. They were coached by Bob Motzko, in his third season, and played their home games at 3M Arena at Mariucci.

== Season ==
As a result of the ongoing COVID-19 pandemic the entire college ice hockey season was delayed. Because the NCAA had previously announced that all winter sports athletes would retain whatever eligibility they possessed through at least the following year, none of Minnesota's players would lose a season of play. However, the NCAA also approved a change in its transfer regulations that would allow players to transfer and play immediately rather than having to sit out a season, as the rules previously required.

Despite all of the uncertainty about the season, Minnesota began with a tremendous start. The team won its first 10 games, rocketing up the rankings and claiming the top spot for 5 consecutive weeks. After losing their first game of the season to Wisconsin, the Gophers were stunned by Notre Dame and were swept on home ice. After falling to #4, the team took its frustrations out on Arizona State, scoring 10 goals in back-to-back games. The astounding weekend provided the first double-digit-goal game for the program in 17 years and the first time they had done so in consecutive games since 1983. The Gophers hung near the top of the ranking for the remainder of the season, but a second home sweep, this time by Wisconsin, prevented Minnesota from not only receiving the top spot but also caused the Gophers to finish second in the Big Ten standings. By losing 3 out of 4 against the Badgers, Minnesota finished .002 behind Wisconsin due to the team cancelling a weekend series against Penn State.

While the team missed out on a regular season title, the bigger hit came by missing out on the bye for the conference tournament. Minnesota faced Michigan State in the quarterfinals and, despite outshooting the Spartans, found themselves trailing late in the third period. Minnesota wasn't able to score a single goal on MSU until less than 5 minutes remained but they were saved by the second worst offense in the nation and ended regulation with a 1–1 tie. Minnesota completely dominated the extra session, shooting 13 shots on goal in just over 10 minutes, and won the game on a goal from the team's scoring leader, Sampo Ranta. After the narrow escape, the Golden Gophers found themselves in another nail-biter, having to get past Michigan in the semifinals. The Wolverines held Minnesota at bay and built a 2-goal lead after 40 minutes. The Gophers were matched shot-for-shot by Michigan in the third but the Maroon and Gold found the net twice and tied the score. This time it only took 6 extra minutes before team captain Sammy Walker netted the game-winner, sending Minnesota to the title game. Still smarting over losing out on the regular season title, Minnesota got out to a lead in the first and then used a huge second period to build a 4-goal lead. The Gophers needed every goal because Wisconsin came roaring back in the third, firing 21 shots in the final frame alone and scoring three times to cut the lead to 1. With time winding down and the Gophers clinging to their lead, Wisconsin was forced to pull their goaltender. Minnesota scored an empty-net goal to seal the game and win the team's first Big Ten Championship in six years.

Minnesota received the 3rd overall seed and was given the top spot in the West Regional bracket. The team lived up to their billing in the opening game by overwhelming Omaha 7–2. In their second game, the Gophers faced #5 Minnesota State after the mavericks had won the program's first tournament game at the Division I level. MSU was riding high and played a nearly perfect game, holding the Gophers to just 9 shots on goal through the first two periods. Minnesota woke up in the third and started shooting the puck but the team couldn't get anything by Dryden McKay and the Golden Gophers ended their season with a 0–4 loss.

Colin Schmidt and Noah Weber sat out the season.

== Departures ==
Player	Position	Nationality	Cause
Joey Marooney	Forward	United States	Graduation
Tyler Nanne	Defenseman	United States	Graduation (signed with Hershey Bears)
Garrett Wait	Forward	United States	Transferred to Massachusetts
Ryan Zuhlsdorf	Defenseman	United States	Graduation (signed with Greenville Swamp Rabbits)

== Recruiting ==
Player	Position	Nationality	Age	Notes
Brock Faber	Defenseman	United States	18	Maple Grove, MN; selected 45th overall in 2020
Carl Fish	Defenseman	United States	20	Saint Paul, MN
Mike Koster	Defenseman	United States	19	Chaska, MN; selected 146th overall in 2019
Mason Nevers	Forward	United States	18	Edina, MN
Colin Schmidt	Forward	United States	20	Maple Grove, MN; transfer from Union

== Roster ==
As of January 3, 2021.

No.	Nat.	Player	Class	Pos	Height	Weight	DoB	Hometown	Previous team	NHL rights
1	(Canada)	Justen Close	Sophomore	G	5' 10" (1.78 m)	175 lb (79 kg)	1998-05-20	Kindersley, Saskatchewan	Kindersley Klippers (SJHL)	—
2	(United States)	Jackson LaCombe	Sophomore	D	6' 2" (1.88 m)	200 lb (91 kg)	2001-01-09	Eden Prairie, Minnesota	Shattuck-Saint Mary's (Midget AAA)	ANA, 39th overall 2019
3	(United States)	Robbie Stucker	Junior	D	6' 3" (1.91 m)	180 lb (82 kg)	1998-09-30	St. Paul, Minnesota	Fargo Force (USHL)	CBJ, 210th overall 2017
4	(United States)	Ben Brinkman	Junior	D	6' 1" (1.85 m)	220 lb (100 kg)	2000-10-04	Edina, Minnesota	Edina High School (USHS–MN)	DAL, 173rd overall 2019
5	(United States)	Matt Denman	Junior	D	6' 0" (1.83 m)	190 lb (86 kg)	1998-04-20	Prior Lake, Minnesota	Cedar Rapids RoughRiders (USHL)	—
6	(United States)	Mike Koster	Freshman	D	5' 9" (1.75 m)	170 lb (77 kg)	2001-04-13	Chaska, Minnesota	Tri-City Storm (USHL)	TOR, 146th overall 2019
7	(United States)	Brannon McManus (A)	Senior	F	5' 11" (1.8 m)	175 lb (79 kg)	1999-07-05	Newport Beach, California	Chicago Steel (USHL)	—
9	(United States)	Sammy Walker (C)	Junior	F	5' 11" (1.8 m)	165 lb (75 kg)	1999-06-07	Edina, Minnesota	Edina High School (USHS–MN)	TBL, 200th overall 2017
11	(United States)	Jonny Sorenson	Sophomore	F	6' 1" (1.85 m)	175 lb (79 kg)	1999-09-21	St. Louis Park, Minnesota	Fairbanks Ice Dogs (NAHL)	—
13	(United States)	Cullen Munson	Senior	F	5' 11" (1.8 m)	180 lb (82 kg)	1996-04-04	Edina, Minnesota	Janesville Jets (NAHL)	—
14	(United States)	Brock Faber	Freshman	D	6' 1" (1.85 m)	195 lb (88 kg)	2002-08-22	Maple Grove, Minnesota	USNTDP (USHL)	LAK, 45th overall 2020
16	(United States)	Colin Schmidt	Sophomore	F	6' 4" (1.93 m)	225 lb (102 kg)	2000-01-06	Wayzata, Minnesota	Union (ECAC)	—
18	(United States)	Mason Nevers	Freshman	F	5' 9" (1.75 m)	180 lb (82 kg)	2001-04-03	Edina, Minnesota	Des Moines Buccaneers (USHL)	—
19	(United States)	Scott Reedy	Senior	F	6' 2" (1.88 m)	210 lb (95 kg)	1999-04-04	Prior Lake, Minnesota	USNTDP (USHL)	SJS, 102nd overall 2017
21	(United States)	Nathan Burke	Junior	F	6' 2" (1.88 m)	190 lb (86 kg)	1998-12-21	Scottsdale, Arizona	Aberdeen Wings (NAHL)	—
22	(United States)	Bryce Brodzinski	Sophomore	F	6' 0" (1.83 m)	215 lb (98 kg)	2000-08-09	Blaine, Minnesota	Blaine High School (USHS–MN)	PHI, 196th overall 2019
23	(United States)	Ryan Johnson	Sophomore	D	6' 1" (1.85 m)	175 lb (79 kg)	2001-07-24	Irvine, California	Sioux Falls Stampede (USHL)	BUF, 31st overall 2019
24	(United States)	Jaxon Nelson	Sophomore	F	6' 4" (1.93 m)	220 lb (100 kg)	2000-03-30	Magnolia, Minnesota	Omaha Lancers (USHL)	—
25	(United States)	Jack Perbix	Sophomore	F	6' 1" (1.85 m)	190 lb (86 kg)	2000-09-13	Elk River, Minnesota	Des Moines Buccaneers (USHL)	ANA, 116th overall 2018
26	(United States)	Carl Fish	Freshman	D	6' 3" (1.91 m)	215 lb (98 kg)	1999-11-09	St. Paul, Minnesota	Bismarck Bobcats (NAHL)	—
27	(United States)	Blake McLaughlin	Junior	F	6' 1" (1.85 m)	170 lb (77 kg)	2000-02-14	Grand Rapids, Minnesota	Chicago Steel (USHL)	ANA, 79th overall 2018
28	(United States)	Sam Rossini	Senior	D	6' 4" (1.93 m)	190 lb (86 kg)	1998-06-19	Burnsville, Minnesota	Penticton Vees (BCHL)	—
31	(United States)	Jared Moe	Sophomore	G	6' 4" (1.93 m)	220 lb (100 kg)	1999-07-22	New Prague, Minnesota	Waterloo Black Hawks (USHL)	WPG, 184th overall 2017
39	(United States)	Ben Meyers (A)	Sophomore	F	5' 11" (1.8 m)	195 lb (88 kg)	1998-11-15	Delano, Minnesota	Fargo Force (USHL)	—
45	(Canada)	Jack LaFontaine (A)	Senior	G	6' 3" (1.91 m)	210 lb (95 kg)	1998-01-06	Mississauga, Ontario	Penticton Vees (BCHL)	CAR, 75th overall 2016
51	(United States)	Noah Weber	Sophomore	F	6' 0" (1.83 m)	210 lb (95 kg)	1998-02-15	Eagle River, Wisconsin	Madison Capitols (USHL)	—
55	(United States)	Matt Staudacher	Sophomore	D	6' 1" (1.85 m)	190 lb (86 kg)	2000-02-07	Fenton, Michigan	Muskegon Lumberjacks (USHL)	—
58	(Finland)	Sampo Ranta	Junior	F	6' 2" (1.88 m)	200 lb (91 kg)	2000-05-31	Naantali, Finland	Sioux City Musketeers (USHL)	COL, 78th overall 2018

== Standings ==
2020–21 Big Ten ice hockey Standings
	Conference record											Overall record					
	GP	W	L	T	OTW	OTL	3/SW	PTS	PT%	GF	GA	GP	W	L	T	GF	GA
#8 Wisconsin †	24	17	6	1	1	1	0	52	.722	92	52	31	20	10	1	118	80
#7 Minnesota *	22	16	6	0	0	0	0	48	.727	69	44	31	24	7	0	117	64
#9 Michigan	20	11	9	0	1	0	0	32	.550	69	45	26	15	10	1	91	51
#17 Notre Dame	24	12	10	2	1	2	2	41	.542	65	53	29	14	13	2	84	78
Penn State	18	7	11	0	2	1	0	20	.389	48	68	22	10	12	0	65	81
Ohio State	22	6	16	0	0	2	0	20	.273	39	82	27	7	19	1	53	101
Michigan State	22	5	16	1	2	0	0	15	.250	32	70	27	7	18	2	40	77
Championship: March 16, 2021 † indicates conference regular season champion * indicates conference tournament champion Rankings: USCHO.com Top 20 Poll

== Schedule and results ==
Date	Time	Opponent^{#}	Rank^{#}	Site	TV	Decision	Result	Attendance	Record
Regular season
November 19	7:34 PM	vs. #10 Penn State	#11	3M Arena at Mariucci • Minneapolis, Minnesota	BTN	LaFontaine	W 4–1	129	1–0–0 (1–0–0)
November 20	3:04 PM	vs. #10 Penn State	#11	3M Arena at Mariucci • Minneapolis, Minnesota	BTN	LaFontaine	W 3–2	159	2–0–0 (2–0–0)
November 23	7:34 PM	vs. #10 Ohio State	#8	3M Arena at Mariucci • Minneapolis, Minnesota	BTN	LaFontaine	W 4–1	0	3–0–0 (3–0–0)
November 24	7:34 PM	vs. #10 Ohio State	#8	3M Arena at Mariucci • Minneapolis, Minnesota	BTN	LaFontaine	W 2–0	0	4–0–0 (4–0–0)
December 3	7:00 PM	at Michigan State	#5	Munn Ice Arena • East Lansing, Michigan	FSD, FSN	LaFontaine	W 3–1	0	5–0–0 (5–0–0)
December 4	7:05 PM	at Michigan State	#5	Munn Ice Arena • East Lansing, Michigan	FSD, FSN	LaFontaine	W 4–2	88	6–0–0 (6–0–0)
December 8	7:04 PM	at #5 Michigan	#4	Yost Ice Arena • Ann Arbor, Michigan (Rivalry)	BTN	LaFontaine	W 3–1	0	7–0–0 (7–0–0)
December 8	6:35 PM	at #5 Michigan	#4	Yost Ice Arena • Ann Arbor, Michigan (Rivalry)	BTN	LaFontaine	W 4–0	0	8–0–0 (8–0–0)
January 3	3:00 PM	vs. Arizona State*	#1	3M Arena at Mariucci • Minneapolis, Minnesota		LaFontaine	W 4–1	0	9–0–0
January 4	7:05 PM	vs. Arizona State*	#1	3M Arena at Mariucci • Minneapolis, Minnesota		Moe	W 6–4	0	10–0–0
January 9	4:04 PM	at #12 Wisconsin	#1	Kohl Center • Madison, Wisconsin		LaFontaine	L 1–3	0	10–1–0 (8–1–0)
January 10	4:04 PM	at #12 Wisconsin	#1	Kohl Center • Madison, Wisconsin		LaFontaine	W 5–3	0	11–1–0 (9–1–0)
January 15	7:05 PM	at Notre Dame	#1	3M Arena at Mariucci • Minneapolis, Minnesota		LaFontaine	L 2–3	116	11–2–0 (9–2–0)
January 16	5:00 PM	at Notre Dame	#1	3M Arena at Mariucci • Minneapolis, Minnesota		LaFontaine	L 1–2	0	11–3–0 (9–3–0)
January 21	7:05 PM	vs. Arizona State*	#4	3M Arena at Mariucci • Minneapolis, Minnesota		LaFontaine	W 10–0	0	12–3–0
January 22	4:00 PM	vs. Arizona State*	#4	3M Arena at Mariucci • Minneapolis, Minnesota		Moe	W 10–2	0	13–3–0
January 29	5:04 PM	at Ohio State	#4	Value City Arena • Columbus, Ohio	BTN	LaFontaine	W 5–1	0	14–3–0 (10–3–0)
January 30	4:04 PM	at Ohio State	#4	Value City Arena • Columbus, Ohio	BTN	LaFontaine	W 5–2	0	15–3–0 (11–3–0)
February 5	7:05 PM	at #11 Wisconsin	#2	3M Arena at Mariucci • Minneapolis, Minnesota		LaFontaine	L 1–4	0	15–4–0 (11–4–0)
February 6	7:05 PM	at #11 Wisconsin	#2	3M Arena at Mariucci • Minneapolis, Minnesota		LaFontaine	L 1–8	0	15–5–0 (11–5–0)
February 12	6:36 PM	at Notre Dame	#5	Compton Family Ice Arena • Notre Dame, Indiana		LaFontaine	W 3–0	79	16–5–0 (12–5–0)
February 13	4:36 PM	at Notre Dame	#5	Compton Family Ice Arena • Notre Dame, Indiana		LaFontaine	W 3–0	80	17–5–0 (13–5–0)
February 19	7:05 PM	vs. Michigan State	#4	3M Arena at Mariucci • Minneapolis, Minnesota		LaFontaine	W 4–2	0	18–5–0 (14–5–0)
February 20	5:05 PM	vs. Michigan State	#4	3M Arena at Mariucci • Minneapolis, Minnesota		LaFontaine	W 5–1	0	19–5–0 (15–5–0)
March 5	7:05 PM	vs. #7 Michigan	#3	3M Arena at Mariucci • Minneapolis, Minnesota (Rivalry)		LaFontaine	L 2–5	0	19–6–0 (15–6–0)
March 6	4:04 PM	vs. #7 Michigan	#3	3M Arena at Mariucci • Minneapolis, Minnesota (Rivalry)		LaFontaine	W 4–2	0	20–6–0 (16–6–0)
Big Ten Tournament
March 14	3:05 PM	vs. Michigan State*	#4	Compton Family Ice Arena • Notre Dame, Indiana (Quarterfinal)	BTN	LaFontaine	W 2–1 ^{OT}	134	21–6–0
March 15	3:05 PM	vs. #7 Michigan*	#4	Compton Family Ice Arena • Notre Dame, Indiana (Semifinal)		LaFontaine	W 3–2 ^{OT}	123	22–6–0
March 16	7:05 PM	vs. #5 Wisconsin*	#4	Compton Family Ice Arena • Notre Dame, Indiana (Championship)		LaFontaine	W 6–4	149	23–6–0
NCAA Tournament
March 27	8:00 PM	vs. #12 Omaha*	#2	Budweiser Events Center • Loveland, Colorado (Regional semifinal)	ESPNU	LaFontaine	W 7–2	125	24–6–0
March 28	7:00 PM	vs. #5 Minnesota State*	#2	Budweiser Events Center • Loveland, Colorado (Regional final)	ESPN2	LaFontaine	L 0–4	175	24–7–0
*Non-conference game. ^{#}Rankings from USCHO.com Poll. All times are in Central Time.

== Scoring statistics ==
Name	Position	Games	Goals	Assists	Points	PIM
Sampo Ranta	LW/RW	31	19	12	31	10
Sammy Walker	C	31	13	16	29	12
Blake McLaughlin	C/LW	31	12	16	28	8
Ben Meyers	C/LW	31	12	16	28	12
Scott Reedy	C	28	11	17	28	6
Brannon McManus	C/RW	27	9	16	25	0
Jackson LaCombe	D	27	4	17	21	8
Jaxon Nelson	C	31	5	10	15	34
Bryce Brodzinski	RW	30	8	6	14	10
Ryan Johnson	D	27	1	11	12	14
Mike Koster	D	31	3	9	12	2
Brock Faber	D	27	1	11	12	14
Jack Perbix	D/RW	30	4	5	9	8
Cullen Munson	C	31	2	7	9	12
Jonny Sorenson	F	28	5	2	7	2
Nathan Burke	F	26	4	3	7	2
Mason Nevers	C	25	2	4	6	4
Matt Staudacher	D	26	0	6	6	6
Robbie Stucker	D	23	0	5	5	2
Ben Brinkman	D	29	0	5	5	18
Carl Fish	D	12	1	2	3	2
Sam Rossini	D	5	0	3	3	0
Jack LaFontaine	G	29	0	2	2	0
Jared Moe	G	3	0	1	1	0
Justen Close	G	1	0	0	0	0
Bench	-	-	-	-	-	2
Total			117	203	320	186

== Goaltending statistics ==
Name	Games	Minutes	Wins	Losses	Ties	Goals against	Saves	Shut outs	SV %	GAA
Jack LaFontaine	29	1705	22	7	0	51	717	5	.934	1.79
Jared Moe	3	139	2	0	0	8	46	0	.852	3.45
Justen Close	1	20	0	0	0	2	5	0	.714	6.00
Empty Net	-	11	-	-	-	3	-	-	-	-
Total	31	1876	24	7	0	64	768	5	.923	2.05

== Rankings ==
Poll	Week																					
Poll	Pre	1	2	3	4	5	6	7	8	9	10	11	12	13	14	15	16	17	18	19	20	21 (Final)
USCHO.com	14	11	8	5	4	1	1	1	1	1	4	4	2	5	4	4	3	4	4	2	-	7
USA Today	13	11	7	5	4	1	1	1	1	1	4	4	2	5	4	4	3	5	4	2	6	7

USCHO did not release a poll in week 20.

== Awards and honors ==
Honor	Player	Ref
Jack LaFontaine	Mike Richter Award	
Jack LaFontaine	AHCA West First Team All-American	
Sampo Ranta	AHCA West First Team All-American	
Jackson LaCombe	AHCA West Second Team All-American	
Jack LaFontaine	Big Ten Goaltender of the Year	
Jack LaFontaine	Big Ten Tournament Most Outstanding Player	
Jack LaFontaine	Big Ten First Team	
Jackson Lacombe	Big Ten First Team	
Sampo Ranta	Big Ten First Team	
Brock Faber	Big Ten Freshman Team	
Jack LaFontaine	Big Ten All-Tournament Team	
Mike Koster	Big Ten All-Tournament Team	
Sampo Ranta	Big Ten All-Tournament Team	
Sammy Walker	Big Ten All-Tournament Team	

== Players drafted into the NHL ==
=== 2021 NHL entry draft ===
Round	Pick	Player	NHL team
1	18	Chaz Lucius^{†}	Winnipeg Jets
2	57	Matthew Knies^{†}	Toronto Maple Leafs
2	58	Tristan Broz^{†}	Pittsburgh Penguins
4	104	Brody Lamb^{†}	New York Rangers

† incoming freshman
