= 2020–21 Big Ten Conference ice hockey season =

- Season: 2020–21
- Conference: Big Ten Conference
- Division: Division I
- Sport: ice hockey
- Duration: November 13, 2020– March 28, 2021
- Number of teams: 7

2021 NHL Entry Draft
- Top draft pick: Owen Power
- Picked by: Buffalo Sabres

Regular Season
- Season champions: Wisconsin
- Season MVP: Cole Caufield
- Top scorer: Cole Caufield

Big Ten tournament
- Tournament champions: Minnesota
- Runners-up: Wisconsin
- Tournament MVP: Jack LaFontaine
- Top scorer: Alex Limoges

NCAA tournament
- Bids: 4
- Record: 1–2
- Best Finish: Regional final
- Team(s): Minnesota

The 2020–21 Big Ten men's ice hockey season was the 31st season of play for the Big Ten Conference's men's ice hockey division and took place during the 2020–21 NCAA Division I men's ice hockey season. The start to the regular season was delayed until November 13, 2020, and concluded on March 6, 2021. The conference tournament was held at the Compton Family Ice Arena in Notre Dame, Indiana.

== Season ==
Due to the ongoing COVID-19 pandemic, the Big Ten season did not begin until mid-November, 6 weeks later than usual. As a result of the pandemic, the Big Ten only scheduled conference opponents during the regular season with one exception. Arizona State, an independent program, entered into a scheduling alliance with the Big Ten for this season. The group consented to play the full season on the road and forfeit its right to compete in the Big Ten tournament.

The regular season was highlighted by the prominence of Minnesota for most of the year and the scoring exploits of Cole Caufield. Caufield averaged a goal per game pace for the year and led both the Big Ten and the nation in both goals and points. The conference was able to earn 3 at-large bids for member schools, resulting in more than half of the Big Ten making the NCAA tournament. Unfortunately, while the conference was able to avoid too much trouble from COVID during the regular season, both Michigan and Notre Dame had players test positive just before their regional semifinal games and were forced to withdraw. As a result, their matchup with Boston College was ruled a no-contest and the Eagles automatically advanced to the Northeast Regional final. Similarly, on March 26, the NCAA announced Michigan was forced to withdraw as well due to COVID protocols. Minnesota provided the conference with its only tournament victory, defeating Omaha 7–2 before losing in the quarterfinals to in-state rival Minnesota State.

After the season, Michigan made national headlines by having 3 players be drafted in the first five selections of the 2021 NHL entry draft. The Wolverines had an incoming freshman taken 4th overall as well.

== Standings ==
2020–21 Big Ten ice hockey Standings
	Conference record											Overall record					
	GP	W	L	T	OTW	OTL	3/SW	PTS	PT%	GF	GA	GP	W	L	T	GF	GA
#8 Wisconsin †	24	17	6	1	1	1	0	52	.722	92	52	31	20	10	1	118	80
#7 Minnesota *	22	16	6	0	0	0	0	48	.727	69	44	31	24	7	0	117	64
#9 Michigan	20	11	9	0	1	0	0	32	.550	69	45	26	15	10	1	91	51
#17 Notre Dame	24	12	10	2	1	2	2	41	.542	65	53	29	14	13	2	84	78
Penn State	18	7	11	0	2	1	0	20	.389	48	68	22	10	12	0	65	81
Ohio State	22	6	16	0	0	2	0	20	.273	39	82	27	7	19	1	53	101
Michigan State	22	5	16	1	2	0	0	15	.250	32	70	27	7	18	2	40	77
Championship: March 16, 2021 † indicates conference regular season champion * indicates conference tournament champion Rankings: USCHO.com Top 20 Poll

== Coaches ==
=== Records ===
Team	Head coach	Season at school	Record at school	Big Ten record
Michigan	Mel Pearson	4	53–45–14	30–30–10
Michigan State	Danton Cole	4	39–60–9	25–39–8
Minnesota	Bob Motzko	3	34–30–11	20–18–10
Notre Dame	Jeff Jackson	16	334–206–64	37–26–7
Ohio State	Steve Rohlik	8	133–95–33	66–67–17
Penn State	Guy Gadowsky	10	145–120–23	59–57–14
Wisconsin	Tony Granato	5	62–72–12	36–46–10

== Statistics ==
=== Leading scorers ===
GP = Games played; G = Goals; A = Assists; Pts = Points; PIM = Penalty minutes

Player	Position	Team	GP	G	A	Pts	PIM
Cole Caufield	Sophomore	Wisconsin	24	24	19	43	2
Linus Weissbach	Senior	Wisconsin	24	9	24	33	8
Dylan Holloway	Sophomore	Wisconsin	18	11	20	31	4
Alex Steeves	Junior	Notre Dame	24	14	15	29	8
Thomas Bordeleau	Freshman	Michigan	18	7	18	25	10
Ty Pelton-Byce	Senior	Wisconsin	19	11	14	25	2
Graham Saggert	Junior	Notre Dame	22	6	18	24	8
Kent Johnson	Freshman	Michigan	20	7	12	19	2
Roman Ahcan	Junior	Wisconsin	21	7	12	19	22
Sampo Ranta	Junior	Minnesota	22	12	7	19	6
Sammy Walker	Junior	Minnesota	22	9	10	19	8
Ben Meyers	Sophomore	Minnesota	22	9	10	19	12

=== Leading goaltenders ===
Minimum 1/3 of team's minutes played in conference games.
GP = Games played; Min = Minutes played; W = Wins; L = Losses; T = Ties; GA = Goals against; SO = Shutouts; SV% = Save percentage; GAA = Goals against average

Player	Class	Team	GP	Min	W	L	T	GA	SO	SV%	GAA
Cameron Rowe	Freshman	Wisconsin	11	555	7	0	1	16	1	.947	1.73
Jack LaFontaine	Senior	Minnesota	22	1272	16	6	0	38	4	.932	1.79
Dylan St. Cyr	Senior	Notre Dame	18	1067	9	8	1	38	3	.930	2.14
Strauss Mann	Junior	Michigan	16	894	8	8	0	33	3	.924	2.21
Robbie Beydoun	Senior	Wisconsin	16	884	10	6	0	34	3	.927	2.31

== Conference tournament ==
Quarterfinals; March 14
4	Notre Dame	3
5	Penn State	6
2	Minnesota	2*
7	Michigan State	1
3	Michigan	4
6	Ohio State	0

Semifinals; March 15
1	Wisconsin	4*
5	Penn State	3
2	Minnesota	3*
3	Michigan	2

Championship; March 16
1	Wisconsin	4
2	Minnesota	6

Note: * denotes overtime periods.

== NCAA tournament ==
=== Regional semifinal ===
==== East ====
March 26, 2021; 1:00 PM	(1) Wisconsin	3 – 6 (0–2, 1–2, 2–2)	(4) Bemidji State	Webster Bank Arena, Bridgeport, Connecticut; Attendance: 0

Game reference

Robbie Beydoun (40 min)
Cameron Rowe (20 min)
Goalies
Zach Driscoll
Referees:
Brendan Blanchard
Chris Leavitt
Linesmen:
Bob Griffin
Brendan Lewis

	0–1	06:33 – Ross Armour (5) (Rosén)
	0–2	19:44 – Elias Rosén (5) (unassisted)
(C. Caufield, Pelton-Byce) Linus Weissbach (12) – PP – 22:38	1–2
	1–3	34:42 – Ethan Somoza (3) (Miller, Harris)
	1–4	38:39 – SH GW – Owen Sillinger (10) (unassisted)
	1–5	46:08 – Ethan Somoza (3) (Harris)
(Holloway, Pelton-Byce) Cole Caufield (29) – PP – 48:19	2–5
(Ahcan, Vorlicky) Cole Caufield (30) – 54:56	3–5
	3–6	59:58 – EN – Brendan Harris (9) (Somoza)

6 min
Penalties
12 min
33
Shots
40

==== West ====
March 27, 2021; 8:00 PM	(1) Minnesota	7 – 2 (3–1, 3–0, 1–1)	(4) Omaha	Budweiser Events Center, Loveland, Colorado; Attendance: 125

Game reference

Jack LaFontaine
Goalies
Isaiah Saville (27:13)
Austin Roden (32:47)
Referees:
Scott Hansen
Holton Walker
Linesmen:
Kevin Briganti
Kyle Richetelle

(Munson, Faber) Mason Nevers (1) – 05:48	1–0
(Faber, Johnson) Jack Perbix (4) – 15:35	2–0
(McLaughlin, Walker) Scott Reedy (11) – GW – 17:36	3–0
	3–1	18:04 – Taylor Ward (12) (Weiss, Scanlin)
(Faber, Meyers) Ryan Johnson (2) – 20:41	4–1
(LaCombe, Brodzinski) Ben Meyers (12) – 27:13	5–1
(Ranta, Faber) Mason Nevers (2) – 36:13	6–1
	6–2	43:05 – Taylor Ward (13) (Weiss, Proctor)
(Nelson, Faber) Sampo Ranta (19) – 44:17	7–2

2 min
Penalties
4 min
30
Shots
28

=== Regional final ===
==== West ====
March 28, 2021; 6:00	(1) Minnesota	0 – 4 (0–2, 0–0, 0–2)	(2) Minnesota State	Budweiser Events Center, Loveland, Colorado; Attendance: 175

Game reference

Jack LaFontaine
Goalies
Dryden McKay
Referees:
Peter Schlittenhardt
Jermey Tufts
Linesmen:
William Kingdom
Nicholas Briganti

0–1	10:23 – GW – Sam Morton (5) (Sandelin, Zmolek)
0–2	12:30 – Ryan Sandelin (7) (McNeely, Furry)
0–3	49:50 – Nathan Smith (7) (Borchardt, Napravnik)
0–4	57:41 – EN – Dallas Gerads (8) (Aamodt)

6 min
Penalties
8 min
22
Shots
27

== Ranking ==
=== USCHO ===
Team	Pre	1	2	3	4	5	6	7	8	9	10	11	12	13	14	15	16	17	18	19	20	Final
Michigan	12	6	4	7	5	6	7	8	9	9	8	7	7	8	7	7	7	6	7	8	N/A	9
Michigan State	NR	NR	NR	NR	NR	NR	NR	NR	NR	NR	NR	NR	NR	NR	NR	NR	NR	NR	NR	NR	N/A	NR
Minnesota	14	11	8	5	4	1	1	1	1	1	4	4	2	5	4	4	3	4	4	2	N/A	7
Notre Dame	20	NR	NR	16	15	16	18	18	18	NR	16	NR	NR	NR	NR	NR	NR	19	20	18	N/A	17
Ohio State	10	9	10	13	14	18	NR	NR	NR	NR	NR	NR	NR	NR	NR	NR	NR	NR	NR	NR	N/A	NR
Penn State	9	10	15	NR	NR	NR	NR	NR	NR	NR	NR	NR	NR	NR	NR	NR	NR	NR	NR	NR	N/A	NR
Wisconsin	NR	14	14	14	12	14	13	14	12	12	12	13	11	7	5	5	5	5	5	4	N/A	8

USCHO did not release a poll in week 20.

=== USA Today ===
Team	Pre	1	2	3	4	5	6	7	8	9	10	11	12	13	14	15	16	17	18	19	20	Final
Michigan	12	6	3	7	5	6	7	8	9	10	9	7	7	8	6	7	7	7	6	8	9	9
Michigan State	NR	NR	NR	NR	NR	NR	NR	NR	NR	NR	NR	NR	NR	NR	NR	NR	NR	NR	NR	NR	NR	NR
Minnesota	13	11	7	5	4	1	1	1	1	1	4	4	2	5	4	4	3	5	4	2	6	7
Notre Dame	NR	NR	NR	13	15	NR	NR	NR	NR	NR	NR	NR	NR	NR	NR	NR	NR	NR	NR	NR	NR	NR
Ohio State	10	10	10	14	NR	NR	NR	NR	NR	NR	NR	NR	NR	NR	NR	NR	NR	NR	NR	NR	NR	NR
Penn State	9	9	14	NR	NR	NR	NR	NR	NR	NR	NR	NR	NR	NR	NR	NR	NR	NR	NR	NR	NR	NR
Wisconsin	NR	13	15	NR	13	14	15	15	14	14	12	13	12	6	5	5	5	4	5	4	8	8

== Awards ==
=== NCAA ===
Award	Recipient	
Hobey Baker Award	Cole Caufield, Wisconsin	
Tim Taylor Award	Thomas Bordeleau, Michigan	
Mike Richter Award	Jack LaFontaine, Minnesota	
AHCA All-American Teams
West First Team	Position	Team
Jack LaFontaine	G	Minnesota
Cameron York	D	Michigan
Cole Caufield	F	Wisconsin
Sampo Ranta	F	Minnesota
West Second Team	Position	Team
Jackson LaCombe	D	Minnesota
Dylan Holloway	F	Wisconsin
Linus Weissbach	F	Wisconsin

=== Big Ten ===
Award		Recipient
Player of the Year		Cole Caufield, Wisconsin
Defensive Player of the Year		Cameron York, Michigan
Goaltender of the Year		Jack LaFontaine, Minnesota
Freshman of the Year		Thomas Bordeleau, Michigan
Scoring Champion		Cole Caufield, Wisconsin
Coach of the Year		Tony Granato, Wisconsin
All-Big Ten Teams
First Team	Position	Second Team
Jack LaFontaine, Minnesota	G	Strauss Mann, Michigan
Cameron York, Michigan	D	Owen Power, Michigan
Jackson LaCombe, Minnesota	D	Spencer Stastney, Notre Dame
Sampo Ranta, Minnesota	F	Thomas Bordeleau, Michigan
Cole Caufield, Wisconsin	F	Alex Steeves, Notre Dame
Dylan Holloway, Wisconsin	F	Linus Weissbach, Wisconsin
Freshman Team	Position	
Cameron Rowe, Wisconsin	G	
Owen Power, Michigan	D	
Brock Faber, Minnesota	D	
Matty Beniers, Michigan	F	
Thomas Bordeleau, Michigan	F	
Kent Johnson, Michigan	F	

=== Conference tournament ===
Tournament MOP
Jack LaFontaine		Minnesota
All-Tournament Team
Player	Pos	Team
Jack LaFontaine	G	Minnesota
Mike Koster	D	Minnesota
Ty Emberson	D	Wisconsin
Cole Caufield	F	Wisconsin
Sampo Ranta	F	Minnesota
Sammy Walker	F	Minnesota

== 2021 NHL entry draft ==
Round	Pick	Player	College	NHL team
1	1	Owen Power	Michigan	Buffalo Sabres
1	2	Matty Beniers	Michigan	Seattle Kraken
1	4	Luke Hughes^{†}	Michigan	New Jersey Devils
1	5	Kent Johnson	Michigan	Columbus Blue Jackets
1	18	Chaz Lucius^{†}	Minnesota	Winnipeg Jets
1	24	Mackie Samoskevich^{†}	Michigan	Florida Panthers
1	25	Corson Ceulemans^{†}	Wisconsin	Columbus Blue Jackets
2	57	Matthew Knies^{†}	Minnesota	Toronto Maple Leafs
2	58	Tristan Broz^{†}	Minnesota	Pittsburgh Penguins
3	66	Sasha Pastujov^{†}	Notre Dame	Anaheim Ducks
4	104	Brody Lamb^{†}	Minnesota	New York Rangers
4	126	Dylan Duke^{†}	Michigan	Tampa Bay Lightning
7	195	Justin Janicke^{†}	Notre Dame	Seattle Kraken
7	206	Owen McLaughlin^{†}	Penn State	Philadelphia Flyers
7	215	Daniel Laatsch^{†}	Wisconsin	Pittsburgh Penguins

† incoming freshman
