= 2021 Big Ten men's ice hockey tournament =

College hockey tournament

- Dates: March 14–16, 2021
- Teams: 7
- Finals site: Compton Family Ice Arena; Notre Dame, Indiana
- Champions: Minnesota (2nd title)
- Winning coach: Bob Motzko (1st title)
- MVP: Jack LaFontaine (Minnesota)
- Big Ten men's Ice Hockey Tournaments

The 2021 Big Ten Men's Ice Hockey Tournament was the eighth tournament in conference history. It was played between March 14 and March 16, 2021, at Compton Family Ice Arena in Notre Dame, Indiana. By winning the tournament, Minnesota earned the Big Ten's automatic bid to the 2021 NCAA Division I Men's Ice Hockey Tournament.

== Format ==
All seven Big Ten teams will participate in the tournament, which will return to a single-elimination format for the first time since 2017. Due to the number of games postponed this season and the limited number of windows remaining to reschedule contests, the Big Ten Tournament seeding will be determined using the protocol for unbalanced schedules approved prior to the start of the season. Teams will be seeded No. 1 through No. 7 according to the final regular season conference standings, with the team that finishes first in the conference standings receiving a first-round bye.

== Conference standings ==
2020–21 Big Ten ice hockey Standings
	Conference record											Overall record					
	GP	W	L	T	OTW	OTL	3/SW	PTS	PT%	GF	GA	GP	W	L	T	GF	GA
#8 Wisconsin †	24	17	6	1	1	1	0	52	.722	92	52	31	20	10	1	118	80
#7 Minnesota *	22	16	6	0	0	0	0	48	.727	69	44	31	24	7	0	117	64
#9 Michigan	20	11	9	0	1	0	0	32	.550	69	45	26	15	10	1	91	51
#17 Notre Dame	24	12	10	2	1	2	2	41	.542	65	53	29	14	13	2	84	78
Penn State	18	7	11	0	2	1	0	20	.389	48	68	22	10	12	0	65	81
Ohio State	22	6	16	0	0	2	0	20	.273	39	82	27	7	19	1	53	101
Michigan State	22	5	16	1	2	0	0	15	.250	32	70	27	7	18	2	40	77
Championship: March 16, 2021 † indicates conference regular season champion * indicates conference tournament champion Rankings: USCHO.com Top 20 Poll

== Bracket ==
Quarterfinals; March 14
4	Notre Dame	3
5	Penn State	6
2	Minnesota	2*
7	Michigan State	1
3	Michigan	4
6	Ohio State	0

Semifinals; March 15
1	Wisconsin	4*
5	Penn State	3
2	Minnesota	3*
3	Michigan	2

Championship; March 16
1	Wisconsin	4
2	Minnesota	6

Note: * denotes overtime periods.

== Results ==
=== Quarterfinals ===
==== (4) Notre Dame vs. (5) Penn State ====
March 14	Penn State	6 – 3	Notre Dame	Compton Family Ice Arena	Recap
Christian Sarlo – (Alex Limoges) – 18:52		First period	2:10 – pp – Colin Theisen – (Alex Steeves, Landon Slaggert); 2:41 – Jesse Lansdell – (Matt Hellickson, Max Ellis)
Connor McMenamin – (Kevin Wall) – 3:19; Connor McMenamin – (Kevin Wall) – 10:10; Tim Doherty – (Alex Limoges, Connor MacEachern) – pp – 14:55		Second period	No scoring
Chase McLane – (Mason Snell, Connor MacEachern) – 8:20; Chase McLane – (Jarred Westcott) – 19:28		Third period	12:56 – pp – Ryder Rolston – (Jake Pivonka)
Oskar Autio (30 saves / 33 shots)		Goalie stats	Dylan St. Cyr (28 saves / 33 shots)

==== (2) Minnesota vs. (7) Michigan State ====
March 14	Michigan State	1 – 2	OT	Minnesota	Compton Family Ice Arena	Recap
Dennis Cesana – (Mitch Lewandowski, Charlie Combs) – pp – 10:39		First period		No scoring
No scoring		Second period		No scoring
No scoring		Third period		15:01 – Bryce Brodzinski – (Mike Koster, Matt Staudacher)
No scoring		First overtime period		10:35 – Sampo Ranta – (Jaxon Nelson)
Pierce Charleson (48 saves / 50 shots)		Goalie stats		Jack LaFontaine (22 saves / 23 shots)

==== (3) Michigan vs. (6) Ohio State ====
March 14	Ohio State	0 – 4	Michigan	Compton Family Ice Arena	Recap
No scoring		First period	19:23 – pp – Brendan Brisson – (Cam York, Thomas Bordeleau)
No scoring		Second period	11:21 – Cam York – (Luke Morgan, Kent Johnson)
No scoring		Third period	2:53 – Eric Ciccolini – (Nick Granowicz, Jimmy Lambert); 15:07 – Brendan Brisson – (unassisted)
Tommy Nappier (35 saves / 38 shots)		Goalie stats	Strauss Mann (26 saves / 26 shots)

=== Semifinals ===
==== (1) Wisconsin vs. (5) Penn State ====
March 15	Penn State	3 – 4	OT	Wisconsin	Compton Family Ice Arena	Recap
No scoring		First period		18:55 – Sam Stange – (Dominick Mersch, Tarek Baker)
Alex Limoges – (Jimmy Dowd Jr., Christian Sarlo) – 9:21		Second period		No scoring
Tim Doherty – (Christian Sarlo, Alex Limoges) – 1:44; Tim Doherty – (Alex Limoges) – 11:50		Third period		9:45 – Ty Emberson – (Dominick Mersch, Tarek Baker); 14:07 – pp – Cole Caufield – (Linus Weissbach)
No scoring		First overtime period		6:50 – Cole Caufield – (Ty Emberson, Owen Lindmark)
Oskar Autio (41 saves / 45 shots)		Goalie stats		Robbie Beydoun (43 saves / 46 shots)

==== (2) Minnesota vs. (3) Michigan ====
March 15	Michigan	2 – 3	OT	Minnesota	Compton Family Ice Arena	Recap
Kent Johnson – (Jack Becker, Matty Beniers) – pp – 3:44		First period		No scoring
Garrett Van Wyhe – (Dakota Raabe, Jack Summers) – 14:38		Second period		No scoring
No scoring		Third period		4:07 – Nathan Burke – (Jack Perbix); 15:34 – Sampo Ranta – (Jaxon Nelson, Ryan Johnson)
No scoring		First overtime period		6:00 – Sammy Walker – (Ben Brinkman)
Strauss Mann (37 saves / 40 shots)		Goalie stats		Jack LaFontaine (35 saves / 37 shots)

=== Championship ===
==== (1) Wisconsin vs. (2) Minnesota ====
March 16	Minnesota	6 – 4	Wisconsin	Compton Family Ice Arena	Recap
Blake McLaughlin – (Scott Reedy, Jackson LaCombe) – 10:32		First period	No scoring
Mike Koster – (Blake McLaughlin, Sammy Walker) – 1:47; Brannon McManus – (Sampo Ranta, Jaxon Nelson) – 15:24; Scott Reedy – (Sammy Walker, Blake McLaughlin) – 16:49; Jaxon Nelson – (Brannon McManus, Jackson LaCombe) – 18:06		Second period	12:54 – Roman Ahcan – (Ty Emberson)
Blake McLaughlin – (Ben Meyers, Ryan Johnson) – en – 19:36		Third period	4:08 – Mike Vorlicky – (Owen Lindmark, Josh Ess); 5:34 – Roman Ahcan – (Linus Weissbach, Ty Pelton-Byce); 17:49 – Cole Caufield – (Owen Lindmark)
Jack LaFontaine (46 saves / 50 shots)		Goalie stats	Cameron Rowe (19 saves / 24 shots); Robbie Beydoun (9 saves / 9 shots)

== Tournament awards ==
=== All-Tournament Team ===
- G: Jack LaFontaine* (Minnesota)
- D: Mike Koster (Minnesota)
- D: Ty Emberson (Wisconsin)
- F: Cole Caufield (Wisconsin)
- F: Sampo Ranta (Minnesota)
- F: Sammy Walker (Minnesota)

* Most Outstanding Player
