= 2020–21 Penn State Nittany Lions men's ice hockey season =

- Conference: 5th Big Ten
- Home ice: Pegula Ice Arena

Rankings
- USCHO: NR
- USA Today: NR

Record
- Overall: 10–12–0
- Conference: 7–10–0–2–1–0
- Home: 7–3–0
- Road: 3–8–0
- Neutral: 0–1–0

Coaches and captains
- Head coach: Guy Gadowsky
- Assistant coaches: Keith Fisher; Matt Lindsay; Andrew Magera
- Captain: Alex Limoges
- Alternate captain(s): Paul DeNaples; Aarne Talvitie

The 2020–21 Penn State Nittany Lions men's ice hockey season was the 15th season of play for the program and the 8th season in the Big Ten Conference. The Nittany Lions represented Pennsylvania State University and were coached by Guy Gadowsky, in his 10th season.

== Season ==
As a result of the ongoing COVID-19 pandemic the entire college ice hockey season was delayed. Because the NCAA had previously announced that all winter sports athletes would retain whatever eligibility they possessed through at least the following year, none of Penn State's players would lose a season of play. However, the NCAA also approved a change in its transfer regulations that would allow players to transfer and play immediately rather than having to sit out a season, as the rules previously required.

Penn State had a dreadful start to their season, losing their first five games while facing a murderers row of ranked teams. The team rebounded sharply in their sixth contest, scoring 9 goals and nearly doubling their season total to that point. After the Nittany Lions' first win of the year, the team played much better and slowly climbed back to respectability, winning nine of twelve and pulled themselves above .500 near the end of January. Just when it seemed like the team had turned a corner, their season was derailed by COVID-19. All of PSU's games were cancelled in February and the team didn't play again until the end of the regular season. The 34-day layoff hamstrung the team and it showed in their poor performance; despite outshooting Notre Dame in both games, the Nittany Lions lost both by a combined score of 3–12.

By losing an entire months-worth of games, Penn State couldn't overcome their bad start and the team's only path into the NCAA Tournament was by winning the Big Ten. They faced the same Fighting Irish team that had soundly beaten them a week earlier in the first round, but the game time appeared to have knocked the rust off of the Penn State and the Lions scored 5 consecutive goals to give themselves a solid 6–3 win. Their next game was against league-leading Wisconsin and Penn State showed no fear, overcoming an early deficit and outshooting the Badgers to take two separate leads in the game. Once the game got into overtime, the fast pace of regulation seemed to have caught up with PSU and they were overwhelmed by the Badgers, surrendering 10 shots in under 7 minutes and they could only watch as the nation's leading goal-scorer ended their season.

== Departures ==
Player	Position	Nationality	Cause
Evan Barratt	Forward	United States	Signed professional contract (Chicago Blackhawks)
Brandon Biro	Forward	Canada	Graduation (Signed with Buffalo Sabres)
Liam Folkes	Forward	Canada	Graduation (Signed with Bakersfield Condors)
Blake Gober	Forward	United States	Graduation
James Gobetz	Defenseman	United States	Graduation
Cole Hults	Defenseman	United States	Signed professional contract (Los Angeles Kings)
Peyton Jones	Goaltender	United States	Graduation (Signed with Colorado Eagles)
Kris Myllari	Defenseman	Canada	Graduation (Signed with Utah Grizzlies)
Nikita Pavlychev	Forward	Russia	Graduation (Signed with Syracuse Crunch)
Denis Smirnov	Forward	Russia	Graduation (Signed with Metallurg Magnitogorsk)
Nate Sucese	Forward	United States	Graduation (Signed with Arizona Coyotes)

== Recruiting ==
Player	Position	Nationality	Age	Notes
Christian Berger	Defenseman	United States	20	St. Louis, Missouri
Tim Doherty	Forward	United States	25	Portsmouth, Rhode Island; graduate transfer from Maine
Jimmy Dowd Jr.	Defenseman	United States	20	Point Pleasant, New Jersey
Xander Lamppa	Forward	United States	21	Rochester, Minnesota
Chase McLane	Forward	United States	20	Trenton, Michigan; selected 209th overall in 2020
Tyler Paquette	Forward	United States	19	Collegeville, Pennsylvania
Christian Sarlo	Forward	United States	19	Lynbrook, New York
Liam Soulière	Goaltender	Canada	21	Brampton, Ontario
Jared Westcott	Forward	United States	21	Imperial, Missouri

== Roster ==
As of January 3, 2021.

No.	Nat.	Player	Class	Pos	Height	Weight	DoB	Hometown	Previous team	NHL rights
3	(United States)	Paul DeNaples (A)	Junior	D	6' 0" (1.83 m)	184 lb (83 kg)	1998-09-19	Moscow, Pennsylvania	Sioux Falls Stampede (USHL)	—
5	(United States)	Christian Berger	Freshman	D	6' 0" (1.83 m)	182 lb (83 kg)	2000-05-22	St. Louis, Missouri	Omaha Lancers (USHL)	—
6	(United States)	Jimmy Dowd Jr.	Freshman	D	5' 9" (1.75 m)	161 lb (73 kg)	2000-07-09	Point Pleasant Beach, New Jersey	Chicago Steel (USHL)	—
7	(United States)	Evan Bell	Senior	D	5' 11" (1.8 m)	191 lb (87 kg)	1997-06-25	Livonia, Michigan	Fargo Force (USHL)	—
9	(United States)	Alex Limoges (C)	Senior	F	6' 1" (1.85 m)	200 lb (91 kg)	1997-09-16	Winchester, Virginia	Waterloo Black Hawks (USHL)	—
10	(United States)	Christian Sarlo	Freshman	F	6' 0" (1.83 m)	188 lb (85 kg)	2001-06-29	Lynbrook, New York	Lincoln Stars (USHL)	—
11	(United States)	Chase McLane	Freshman	F	6' 2" (1.88 m)	183 lb (83 kg)	2000-04-22	Trenton, Michigan	Tri-City Storm (USHL)	NSH, 209th overall 2020
12	(United States)	Bobby Hampton	Junior (RS)	F	6' 0" (1.83 m)	197 lb (89 kg)	1997-11-18	Middletown, New Jersey	Northeastern (HEA)	—
13	(United States)	Xander Lamppa	Freshman	F	6' 1" (1.85 m)	205 lb (93 kg)	2000-04-30	Rochester, Minnesota	Waterloo Black Hawks (USHL)	—
14	(United States)	Max Sauvé	Junior	F	5' 9" (1.75 m)	165 lb (75 kg)	1998-09-02	Acushnet, Massachusetts	Avon Old Farms (USHS–CT)	—
15	(United States)	Kenny Johnson	Sophomore	D	6' 4" (1.93 m)	230 lb (104 kg)	1998-05-28	Ann Arbor, Michigan	Victoria Grizzlies (BCHL)	—
16	(Canada)	Mason Snell	Sophomore	D	6' 0" (1.83 m)	190 lb (86 kg)	2000-06-18	Courtice, Ontario	Penticton Vees (BCHL)	—
17	(United States)	Tim Doherty	Graduate	F	6' 0" (1.83 m)	190 lb (86 kg)	1995-07-10	Portsmouth, Rhode Island	Maine (HEA)	—
18	(United States)	Clayton Phillips	Senior	D	6' 0" (1.83 m)	195 lb (88 kg)	1999-09-09	Edina, Minnesota	Minnesota (Big Ten)	PIT, 93rd overall 2017
19	(United States)	Connor McMenamin	Sophomore	F	5' 11" (1.8 m)	185 lb (84 kg)	1999-02-25	Collegeville, Pennsylvania	Tri-City Storm (USHL)	—
20	(Finland)	Aarne Talvitie (A)	Junior	F	5' 10" (1.78 m)	198 lb (90 kg)	1999-02-11	Espoo, Finland	Blues U20 (Nuorten SM-liiga)	NJD, 160th overall 2017
21	(United States)	Kevin Wall	Sophomore	F	6' 1" (1.85 m)	190 lb (86 kg)	2000-02-01	Penfield, New York	Chilliwack Chiefs (BCHL)	CAR, 181st overall 2019
22	(United States)	Alex Stevens	Senior	D	6' 1" (1.85 m)	200 lb (91 kg)	1997-02-27	Plymouth, Minnesota	Dubuque Fighting Saints (USHL)	—
23	(United States)	Tyler Paquette	Freshman	F	6' 3" (1.91 m)	200 lb (91 kg)	2001-03-18	Collegeville, Pennsylvania	Green Bay Gamblers (USHL)	—
24	(United States)	Adam Pilewicz	Senior	D	6' 1" (1.85 m)	180 lb (82 kg)	1996-07-20	Sewickley, Pennsylvania	Johnstown Tomahawks (NAHL)	—
25	(United States)	Jared Westcott	Freshman	F	6' 1" (1.85 m)	190 lb (86 kg)	1999-07-18	Imperial, Missouri	Sioux Falls Stampede (USHL)	—
27	(United States)	Sam Sternschein	Senior	F	6' 2" (1.88 m)	204 lb (93 kg)	1998-04-27	Syosset, New York	Lincoln Stars (USHL)	—
28	(United States)	Tyler Gratton	Sophomore	F	6' 2" (1.88 m)	187 lb (85 kg)	1999-08-06	Pottstown, Pennsylvania	Central Illinois Flying Aces (USHL)	—
29	(Canada)	Connor MacEachern	Sophomore	F	5' 10" (1.78 m)	175 lb (79 kg)	1999-07-01	Brooklin, Ontario	Youngstown Phantoms (USHL)	—
31	(Canada)	Liam Soulière	Freshman	G	5' 11" (1.8 m)	180 lb (82 kg)	1999-03-16	Brampton, Ontario	Victoria Grizzlies (BCHL)	—
32	(Canada)	Will Holtforster	Graduate	G	5' 11" (1.8 m)	185 lb (84 kg)	1998-03-12	Mississauga, Ontario	Upper Canada College (CISAA)	—
35	(Finland)	Oskar Autio	Junior	G	6' 0" (1.83 m)	183 lb (83 kg)	1999-10-06	Espoo, Finland	Chicago Steel (USHL)	—

== Standings ==
2020–21 Big Ten ice hockey Standings
	Conference record											Overall record					
	GP	W	L	T	OTW	OTL	3/SW	PTS	PT%	GF	GA	GP	W	L	T	GF	GA
#8 Wisconsin †	24	17	6	1	1	1	0	52	.722	92	52	31	20	10	1	118	80
#7 Minnesota *	22	16	6	0	0	0	0	48	.727	69	44	31	24	7	0	117	64
#9 Michigan	20	11	9	0	1	0	0	32	.550	69	45	26	15	10	1	91	51
#17 Notre Dame	24	12	10	2	1	2	2	41	.542	65	53	29	14	13	2	84	78
Penn State	18	7	11	0	2	1	0	20	.389	48	68	22	10	12	0	65	81
Ohio State	22	6	16	0	0	2	0	20	.273	39	82	27	7	19	1	53	101
Michigan State	22	5	16	1	2	0	0	15	.250	32	70	27	7	18	2	40	77
Championship: March 16, 2021 † indicates conference regular season champion * indicates conference tournament champion Rankings: USCHO.com Top 20 Poll

== Schedule and results ==
Date	Time	Opponent^{#}	Rank^{#}	Site	TV	Decision	Result	Attendance	Record
Regular season
November 19	8:34 PM	at #11 Minnesota	#10	3M Arena at Mariucci • Minneapolis, Minnesota	BTN	Autio	L 1–4	129	0–1–0 (0–1–0)
November 20	4:04 PM	at #11 Minnesota	#10	3M Arena at Mariucci • Minneapolis, Minnesota	BTN	Soulière	L 2–3	159	0–2–0 (0–2–0)
November 23	6:08 PM	at #14 Wisconsin	#15	Kohl Center • Madison, Wisconsin	BTN	Autio	L 3–6	0	0–3–0 (0–3–0)
November 24	6:08 PM	at #14 Wisconsin	#15	Kohl Center • Madison, Wisconsin	BTN	Soulière	L 3–7	0	0–4–0 (0–4–0)
December 2	6:02 PM	vs. #7 Michigan		Pegula Ice Arena • University Park, Pennsylvania	ESPNU	Autio	L 1–3	153	0–5–0 (0–5–0)
December 3	6:04 PM	vs. #7 Michigan		Pegula Ice Arena • University Park, Pennsylvania		Autio	W 9–5	166	1–5–0 (1–5–0)
December 11	6:04 PM	vs. #20 Arizona State*		Pegula Ice Arena • University Park, Pennsylvania		Autio	W 3–2 ^{OT}	184	2–5–0
December 13	2:04 PM	vs. #20 Arizona State*		Pegula Ice Arena • University Park, Pennsylvania		Soulière	W 5–4 ^{OT}	84	3–5–0
January 3	3:00 PM	at Michigan State		Munn Ice Arena • East Lansing, Michigan		Autio	W 1–0	125	4–5–0 (2–5–0)
January 4	3:00 PM	at Michigan State		Munn Ice Arena • East Lansing, Michigan		Soulière	L 1–5	100	4–6–0 (2–6–0)
January 8	5:30 PM	at Ohio State		Value City Arena • Columbus, Ohio		Autio	L 3–6	0	4–7–0 (2–7–0)
January 9	5:30 PM	at Ohio State		Value City Arena • Columbus, Ohio		Autio	W 5–2	0	5–7–0 (3–7–0)
January 15	6:04 PM	vs. Michigan State		Pegula Ice Arena • University Park, Pennsylvania		Autio	W 3–2 ^{OT}	177	6–7–0 (4–7–0)
January 16	3:04 PM	vs. Michigan State		Pegula Ice Arena • University Park, Pennsylvania		Autio	W 3–1	195	7–7–0 (5–7–0)
January 21	6:04 PM	vs. #12 Wisconsin		Pegula Ice Arena • University Park, Pennsylvania		Autio	L 1–4	171	7–8–0 (5–8–0)
January 22	6:04 PM	vs. #12 Wisconsin		Pegula Ice Arena • University Park, Pennsylvania		Autio	W 5–4	180	8–8–0 (6–8–0)
January 28	6:04 PM	vs. Notre Dame		Pegula Ice Arena • University Park, Pennsylvania		Autio	W 2–1 ^{OT}	175	9–8–0 (7–8–0)
January 29	6:04 PM	vs. Notre Dame		Pegula Ice Arena • University Park, Pennsylvania		Autio	L 2–3 ^{OT}	194	9–9–0 (7–9–0)
March 5	7:51 PM	at Notre Dame		Compton Family Ice Arena • Notre Dame, Indiana		Autio	L 2–5	104	9–10–0 (7–10–0)
March 6	5:36 PM	at Notre Dame		Compton Family Ice Arena • Notre Dame, Indiana		Autio	L 1–7	113	9–11–0 (7–11–0)
Big Ten Tournament
March 14	12:05 PM	at #19 Notre Dame*		Compton Family Ice Arena • Notre Dame, Indiana (Big Ten Quarterfinals)	BTN	Autio	W 6–3	166	10–11–0
March 15	4:35 PM	vs. #5 Wisconsin*		Compton Family Ice Arena • Notre Dame, Indiana (Big Ten Semifinals)		Autio	L 3–4 ^{OT}	158	10–12–0
*Non-conference game. ^{#}Rankings from USCHO.com Poll. All times are in Eastern Time.

== Scoring statistics ==
Name	Position	Games	Goals	Assists	Points	PIM
Alex Limoges	C	22	10	12	22	2
Kevin Wall	RW	22	8	11	19	4
Tim Doherty	C/LW	22	8	10	18	4
Connor McMenamin	LW	22	6	9	15	4
Aarne Talvitie	C/LW	21	7	6	13	6
Christian Sarlo	F	21	5	6	11	2
Connor MacEachern	F	21	2	9	11	6
Jimmy Dowd	D	20	2	8	10	4
Clayton Phillips	D	20	3	4	7	25
Sam Sternschein	LW	19	2	5	7	10
Evan Bell	D	22	2	5	7	16
Jared Westcott	F	17	1	5	6	4
Chase McLane	C	19	3	2	5	4
Mason Snell	F	21	2	2	4	20
Bobby Hampton	C	13	2	1	3	0
Alex Stevens	D	17	0	3	3	6
Xander Lamppa	F	13	1	1	2	10
Tyler Gratton	RW	17	1	0	1	8
Liam Soulière	G	5	0	1	1	0
Tyler Paquette	RW	6	0	1	1	0
Paul DeNaples	D	22	0	1	1	8
Christian Berger	D	22	0	1	1	21
Max Sauvé	F	2	0	0	0	0
Will Holtforster	G	2	0	1	1	0
Kenny Johnson	D	5	0	0	0	2
Adam Pilewicz	D	12	0	0	0	2
Oskar Autio	G	18	0	0	0	0
Bench	-	-	-	-	-	2
Total			65	103	168	170

== Goaltending statistics ==
Name	Games	Minutes	Wins	Losses	Ties	Goals against	Saves	Shut outs	SV %	GAA
Oskar Autio	18	1072	9	9	0	56	474	1	.894	3.13
Liam Soulière	5	248	1	3	0	77	103	0	.844	4.60
Will Holtforster	2	6:39	0	0	0	1	3	0	.750	9.02
Empty Net	-	12	-	-	-	5	-	-	-	-
Total	22	1340	10	12	0	81	580	1	.877	3.63

== Rankings ==
Poll	Week																					
Poll	Pre	1	2	3	4	5	6	7	8	9	10	11	12	13	14	15	16	17	18	19	20	21 (Final)
USCHO.com	9	10	15	NR	NR	NR	NR	NR	NR	NR	NR	NR	NR	NR	NR	NR	NR	NR	NR	NR	-	NR
USA Today	9	9	14	NR	NR	NR	NR	NR	NR	NR	NR	NR	NR	NR	NR	NR	NR	NR	NR	NR	NR	NR

USCHO did not release a poll in week 20.

== 2021 NHL entry draft ==
Round	Pick	Player	NHL team
7	206	Owen McLaughlin^{†}	Philadelphia Flyers

† incoming freshman
