= 2020–21 Ohio State Buckeyes men's ice hockey season =

- Conference: 6th Big Ten
- Home ice: Value City Arena

Rankings
- USCHO: NR
- USA Today: NR

Record
- Overall: 7–19–1
- Conference: 6–16–0–0–2–0
- Home: 5–10–1
- Road: 2–8–0
- Neutral: 0–1–0

Coaches and captains
- Head coach: Steve Rohlik
- Assistant coaches: Steve Miller; J. B. Bittner; Dustin Carlson
- Captain: Austin Pooley
- Alternate captain(s): Grant Gabriele; Quinn Preston; Gustaf Westlund

The 2020–21 Ohio State Buckeyes men's ice hockey season was the 58th season of play for the program and the 8th season in the Big Ten Conference. The Buckeyes represented the Ohio State University and were coached by Steve Rohlik, in his 8th season.

== Season ==
As a result of the ongoing COVID-19 pandemic the entire college ice hockey season was delayed. Because the NCAA had previously announced that all winter sports athletes would retain whatever eligibility they possessed through at least the following year, none of Ohio State's players would lose a season of play. However, the NCAA also approved a change in its transfer regulations that would allow players to transfer and play immediately rather than having to sit out a season, as the rules previously required.

Ohio State had a rather bad season. The team started with middling performances and got progressively worse as the season went along. The Buckeyes' offense was hampered by the loss of their top two scorers from the year before (through graduation) but their defense was just as poor if not worse. OSU was shut out 8 times during the season and, despite some impressive performances, averaged less than two goals per game. The team allowed an average of 3.72 goals against (only three teams averaged worse) nearly a goal and a half more than they had the year before. With both their offense and defense heading in the wrong direction, Ohio State finished with its worst record in 26 years. The team somehow managed not to finish last in the Big Ten but, after being shutout by Michigan in the conference quarterfinals, that was little consolation.

== Departures ==
Player	Position	Nationality	Cause
Wyatt Ege	Defenseman	United States	Graduation (signed with HK Nitra)
Miguel Fidler	Forward	United States	Graduation
Ronnie Hein	Forward	United States	Graduation
Tanner Laczynski	Forward	United States	Graduation (signed with Philadelphia Flyers)
Sam McCormick	Forward	United States	Graduation (signed with Jokers de Cergy)
Carson Meyer	Forward	United States	Graduation (signed with Cleveland Monsters)
Matt Miller	Defenseman	United States	Graduation (signed with Wheeling Nailers)
Gordi Myer	Defenseman	United States	Graduation (signed with Greenville Swamp Rabbits)

== Recruiting ==
Player	Position	Nationality	Age	Notes
Matt Cassidy	Forward	United States	21	Medford, NJ; transfer from Quinnipiac
Mark Cheremeta	Forward	United States	21	Parkland, FL; transfer from Boston University
Ryan Dickinson	Defenseman	United States	21	Brighton, MI
Joe Dunlap	Forward	United States	20	Windham, NH
Patrick Guzzo	Forward	United States	18	Marysville, MI
Evan McIntyre	Defenseman	Canada	19	Oakville, ON
Travis Treloar	Forward	Sweden	19	Kalmar, SWE
Dominic Vidoli	Defenseman	United States	21	Strongsville, OH; transfer from Boston University

== Roster ==
As of September 17, 2020.

No.	Nat.	Player	Class	Pos	Height	Weight	DoB	Hometown	Previous team	NHL rights
2	(United States)	James Marooney	Sophomore	D	5' 9" (1.75 m)	165 lb (75 kg)	1999-08-16	Chaska, Minnesota	Waterloo Black Hawks (USHL)	—
3	(United States)	Collin Peters	Senior	F	6' 0" (1.83 m)	185 lb (84 kg)	1997-02-05	Sheboygan, Wisconsin	Lincoln Stars (USHL)	—
4	(Canada)	Layton Ahac	Sophomore	D	6' 2" (1.88 m)	195 lb (88 kg)	2001-02-22	North Vancouver, British Columbia	Prince George Spruce Kings (BCHL)	VGK, 86th overall 2019
7	(Canada)	Evan McIntyre	Freshman	D	5' 10" (1.78 m)	174 lb (79 kg)	2000-10-17	Oakville, Ontario	Penticton Vees (BCHL)	—
8	(Ukraine)	Eugene Fadyeyev	Senior	F	5' 11" (1.8 m)	170 lb (77 kg)	1997-10-08	Kyiv, Ukraine	Madison Capitols (USHL)	—
9	(United States)	Dominic Vidoli	Sophomore	D	6' 0" (1.83 m)	190 lb (86 kg)	1999-06-23	Wake Forest, North Carolina	Sioux City Musketeers (USHL)	—
11	(United States)	Kamil Sadlocha	Sophomore (RS)	F	5' 11" (1.8 m)	185 lb (84 kg)	1999-04-12	Carpentersville, Illinois	Madison Capitols (USHL)	—
12	(United States)	Austin Pooley (C)	Senior	F	6' 2" (1.88 m)	210 lb (95 kg)	1996-07-31	Dublin, Ohio	Youngstown Phantoms (USHL)	—
13	(United States)	Tate Singleton	Sophomore	F	5' 9" (1.75 m)	177 lb (80 kg)	1998-09-05	West Lebanon, New Hampshire	Central Illinois Flying Aces (USHL)	—
14	(United States)	Dalton Messina	Sophomore	F	5' 11" (1.8 m)	195 lb (88 kg)	1998-03-29	Macomb, Michigan	Youngstown Phantoms (USHL)	—
16	(United States)	Quinn Preston (A)	Junior	F	5' 11" (1.8 m)	182 lb (83 kg)	1997-10-21	Trenton, Michigan	Dubuque Fighting Saints (USHL)	—
17	(United States)	Mark Cheremeta	Sophomore	F	5' 11" (1.8 m)	185 lb (84 kg)	1999-07-12	Parkland, Florida	Dubuque Fighting Saints (USHL)	—
18	(United States)	Michael Gildon	Freshman (RS)	F	6' 2" (1.88 m)	196 lb (89 kg)	2001-06-21	Plano, Texas	USNTDP (USHL)	—
19	(United States)	Matthew Jennings	Junior	F	5' 8" (1.73 m)	173 lb (78 kg)	1997-06-07	Buford, Georgia	Green Bay Gamblers (USHL)	—
20	(United States)	Matt Cassidy	Sophomore	F	6' 0" (1.83 m)	187 lb (85 kg)	1999-07-31	Medford, New Jersey	Youngstown Phantoms (USHL)	—
21	(United States)	Joe Dunlap	Freshman	F	6' 0" (1.83 m)	185 lb (84 kg)	1999-11-30	Windham, New Hampshire	Fargo Force (USHL)	—
24	(Canada)	Ryan O'Connell	Junior	D	6' 1" (1.85 m)	185 lb (84 kg)	1999-04-25	Manotick, Ontario	Penticton Vees (BCHL)	TOR, 203rd overall 2017
26	(Canada)	Jaedon Leslie	Sophomore	F	6' 1" (1.85 m)	187 lb (85 kg)	1998-08-04	St. Albert, Alberta	Fort McMurray Oil Barons (AJHL)	—
29	(Sweden)	Gustaf Westlund (A)	Junior	F	6' 0" (1.83 m)	175 lb (79 kg)	1997-12-12	Stockholm, Sweden	Lincoln Stars (USHL)	—
30	(United States)	Ryan Snowden	Sophomore	G	6' 3" (1.91 m)	205 lb (93 kg)	1998-03-06	Lincoln University, Pennsylvania	Central Illinois Flying Aces (USHL)	—
31	(United States)	Evan Moyse	Senior	G	6' 2" (1.88 m)	180 lb (82 kg)	1996-06-18	Olmsted Falls, Ohio	Wichita Falls Wildcats (NAHL)	—
37	(United States)	Tommy Nappier	Senior	G	6' 3" (1.91 m)	220 lb (100 kg)	1998-06-22	St. Louis, Missouri	Omaha Lancers (USHL)	—
61	(United States)	Grant Gabriele (A)	Senior	D	6' 2" (1.88 m)	197 lb (89 kg)	1997-04-17	Brighton, Michigan	Waterloo Black Hawks (USHL)	—
65	(United States)	C. J. Regula	Sophomore	D	6' 3" (1.91 m)	205 lb (93 kg)	1998-05-29	Bloomfield Hills, Michigan	Shreveport Mudbugs (NAHL)	—
71	(United States)	Patrick Guzzo	Freshman	F	6' 3" (1.91 m)	198 lb (90 kg)	2001-11-27	Marysville, Michigan	Waterloo Black Hawks (USHL)	—
74	(United States)	Ryan Dickinson	Freshman	D	6' 3" (1.91 m)	205 lb (93 kg)	1999-09-29	Brighton, Michigan	Shreveport Mudbugs (NAHL)	—
94	(Sweden)	Travis Treloar	Freshman	F	5' 11" (1.8 m)	177 lb (80 kg)	2001-05-12	Kalmar, Sweden	Lincoln Stars (USHL)	—

== Standings ==
2020–21 Big Ten ice hockey Standings
	Conference record											Overall record					
	GP	W	L	T	OTW	OTL	3/SW	PTS	PT%	GF	GA	GP	W	L	T	GF	GA
#8 Wisconsin †	24	17	6	1	1	1	0	52	.722	92	52	31	20	10	1	118	80
#7 Minnesota *	22	16	6	0	0	0	0	48	.727	69	44	31	24	7	0	117	64
#9 Michigan	20	11	9	0	1	0	0	32	.550	69	45	26	15	10	1	91	51
#17 Notre Dame	24	12	10	2	1	2	2	41	.542	65	53	29	14	13	2	84	78
Penn State	18	7	11	0	2	1	0	20	.389	48	68	22	10	12	0	65	81
Ohio State	22	6	16	0	0	2	0	20	.273	39	82	27	7	19	1	53	101
Michigan State	22	5	16	1	2	0	0	15	.250	32	70	27	7	18	2	40	77
Championship: March 16, 2021 † indicates conference regular season champion * indicates conference tournament champion Rankings: USCHO.com Top 20 Poll

== Schedule and results ==
Date	Time	Opponent^{#}	Rank^{#}	Site	TV	Decision	Result	Attendance	Record
Regular season
November 23	8:34 PM	at #8 Minnesota	#10	3M Arena at Mariucci • Minneapolis, Minnesota	BTN	Nappier	L 1–4	0	0–1–0 (0–1–0)
November 24	8:34 PM	at #8 Minnesota	#10	3M Arena at Mariucci • Minneapolis, Minnesota	BTN	Nappier	L 0–2	0	0–2–0 (0–2–0)
November 28	5:30 PM	vs. Michigan State	#10	Value City Arena • Columbus, Ohio		Nappier	L 2–3 ^{OT}	0	0–3–0 (0–3–0)
November 29	5:30 PM	vs. Michigan State	#10	Value City Arena • Columbus, Ohio		Nappier	W 4–2	0	1–3–0 (1–3–0)
December 3	5:30 PM	vs. #14 Wisconsin	#13	Value City Arena • Columbus, Ohio		Nappier	W 4–2	0	2–3–0 (2–3–0)
December 4	5:32 PM	vs. #14 Wisconsin	#13	Value City Arena • Columbus, Ohio	ESPNU	Nappier	L 1–3	0	2–4–0 (2–4–0)
December 12	7:06 PM	at #15 Notre Dame	#14	Compton Family Ice Arena • Notre Dame, Indiana	NBCSN	Nappier	L 0–3	0	2–5–0 (2–5–0)
December 13	5:06 PM	at #15 Notre Dame	#14	Compton Family Ice Arena • Notre Dame, Indiana	NBCSN	Nappier	W 3–2	0	3–5–0 (3–5–0)
December 17	5:30 PM	vs. Arizona State*	#18	Value City Arena • Columbus, Ohio		Nappier	T 4–4 ^{OT}	0	3–5–1
December 18	5:30 PM	vs. Arizona State*	#18	Value City Arena • Columbus, Ohio		Nappier	L 2–3	0	3–6–1
January 8	5:30 PM	vs. Penn State		Value City Arena • Columbus, Ohio		Nappier	W 6–3	0	4–6–1 (4–5–0)
January 9	5:30 PM	vs. Penn State		Value City Arena • Columbus, Ohio		Nappier	L 2–5	0	4–7–1 (4–6–0)
January 15	5:30 PM	at #9 Michigan		Yost Ice Arena • Ann Arbor, Michigan (Rivalry)		Nappier	L 2–4	69	4–8–1 (4–7–0)
January 16	7:04 PM	at #9 Michigan		Yost Ice Arena • Ann Arbor, Michigan (Rivalry)		Nappier	L 0–5	70	4–9–1 (4–8–0)
January 23	4:00 PM	at Michigan State		Munn Ice Arena • East Lansing, Michigan	BTN	Nappier	W 5–1	123	5–9–1 (5–8–0)
January 24	4:00 PM	at Michigan State		Munn Ice Arena • East Lansing, Michigan		Nappier	L 0–2	101	5–10–1 (5–9–0)
January 29	6:04 PM	vs. #4 Minnesota		Value City Arena • Columbus, Ohio	BTN	Nappier	L 1–5	0	5–11–1 (5–10–0)
January 30	5:04 PM	vs. #4 Minnesota		Value City Arena • Columbus, Ohio	BTN	Moyse	L 2–5	0	5–12–1 (5–11–0)
February 5	4:34 PM	vs. Notre Dame		Value City Arena • Columbus, Ohio		Nappier	L 1–6	0	5–13–1 (5–12–0)
February 6	1:34 PM	vs. Notre Dame		Value City Arena • Columbus, Ohio		Snowden	L 1–8	0	5–14–1 (5–13–0)
February 19	5:30 PM	vs. #7 Michigan		Value City Arena • Columbus, Ohio (Rivalry)		Nappier	W 3–2	0	6–14–1 (6–13–0)
February 20	5:30 PM	vs. #7 Michigan		Value City Arena • Columbus, Ohio (Rivalry)		Nappier	L 0–6	0	6–15–1 (6–14–0)
February 26	8:04 PM	at #5 Wisconsin		Kohl Center • Madison, Wisconsin		Nappier	L 1–2 ^{OT}	0	6–16–1 (6–15–0)
February 27	5:04 PM	at #5 Wisconsin		Kohl Center • Madison, Wisconsin		Nappier	L 0–7	0	6–17–1 (6–16–0)
March 4	5:30 PM	vs. Arizona State*		Value City Arena • Columbus, Ohio		Nappier	W 8–3	60	7–17–1
March 5	5:30 PM	vs. Arizona State*		Value City Arena • Columbus, Ohio		Moyse	L 0–5	74	7–18–1
Big Ten Tournament
March 14	8:35 PM	vs. #6 Michigan*		Compton Family Ice Arena • Notre Dame, Indiana (Big Ten Quarterfinals)	BTN	Nappier	L 0–4	119	7–19–1
*Non-conference game. ^{#}Rankings from USCHO.com Poll. All times are in Eastern Time.

== Scoring statistics ==
Name	Position	Games	Goals	Assists	Points	PIM
Travis Treloar	C	25	8	12	20	4
Mark Cheremeta	LW	27	5	14	19	4
Quinn Preston	F	27	6	7	13	12
Grant Gabriele	D	27	3	10	13	0
Tate Singleton	F	27	6	5	11	10
Gustaf Westlund	C	23	6	3	9	50
Layton Ahac	D	27	1	8	9	21
Kamil Sadlocha	C	26	4	3	7	14
Jaedon Leslie	F	21	3	3	6	6
C. J. Regula	D	23	2	4	6	10
Ryan O'Connell	D	27	0	6	6	10
Austin Pooley	C	27	3	2	5	6
Collin Peters	F	22	2	3	5	63
Matt Cassidy	RW	19	1	2	3	20
Evan McIntyre	D	21	0	3	3	19
Patrick Guzzo	C/LW	26	2	0	2	4
Michael Gildon	LW	20	0	2	2	6
Joe Dunlap	F	17	1	0	1	16
Ryan Dickinson	D	14	0	1	1	29
Dominic Vidoli	D	16	0	1	1	4
Evan Moyse	G	5	0	0	0	0
Ryan Snowden	G	5	0	0	0	0
Matthew Jennings	C	7	0	0	0	2
James Marooney	D	10	0	0	0	10
Dalton Messina	F	10	0	0	0	19
Eugene Fadyeyev	F	21	0	0	0	4
Tommy Nappier	G	24	0	0	0	2
Bench	-	-	-	-	-	12
Total			53	89	142	357

== Goaltending statistics ==
Name	Games	Minutes	Wins	Losses	Ties	Goals against	Saves	Shut outs	SV %	GAA
Tommy Nappier	24	1334	7	16	1	73	700	0	.906	3.28
Evan Moyse	5	185	0	2	0	13	81	0	.862	4.21
Ryan Snowden	5	88	0	1	0	9	58	0	.866	6.14
Empty Net	-	27	-	-	-	6	-	-	-	-
Total	27	1629	7	19	1	101	839	0	.893	3.72

== Rankings ==
Poll	Week																					
Poll	Pre	1	2	3	4	5	6	7	8	9	10	11	12	13	14	15	16	17	18	19	20	21 (Final)
USCHO.com	10	9	10	13	14	18	NR	NR	NR	NR	NR	NR	NR	NR	NR	NR	NR	NR	NR	NR	-	NR
USA Today	10	10	10	14	NR	NR	NR	NR	NR	NR	NR	NR	NR	NR	NR	NR	NR	NR	NR	NR	NR	NR

USCHO did not release a poll in week 20.
