= 2020–21 Notre Dame Fighting Irish men's ice hockey season =

NCAA Tournament, Regional semifinals
- Conference: 4th Big Ten
- Home ice: Compton Family Ice Arena

Rankings
- USCHO: 17
- USA Today: NR

Record
- Overall: 14–13–2
- Conference: 12–10–2–1–2–2
- Home: 5–11–2
- Road: 9–2–1
- Neutral: 0–0–0

Coaches and captains
- Head coach: Jeff Jackson
- Assistant coaches: Paul Pooley; Andy Slaggert; Jack Ceglarski
- Captain: Nate Clurman
- Alternate captain(s): Pierce Crawford; Matt Hellickson; Colin Theisen

The 2020–21 Notre Dame Fighting Irish men's ice hockey season was the 61st season of play for the program and the 4th season in the Big Ten Conference. The Fighting Irish represented the University of Notre Dame and were coached by Jeff Jackson, in his 16th season.

== Season ==
As a result of the ongoing COVID-19 pandemic the entire college ice hockey season was delayed. Because the NCAA had previously announced that all winter sports athletes would retain whatever eligibility they possessed through at least the following year, none of Notre Dame's players would lose a season of play. However, the NCAA also approved a change in its transfer regulations that would allow players to transfer and play immediately rather than having to sit out a season, as the rules previously required.

Notre Dame had an up and down season, routinely following up stellar performances with disappointing efforts. The team hovered around the bottom of the top-20 for most of the season and were never more than 2 games away from a .500 record. After alternating multi-game winning streaks through January and February, Notre Dame was ranked #19 and there was belief that the Irish could make the NCAA Tournament despite being just 14–12–2. A solid performance in their conference tournament would definitely improve the team's chances, and with the Fighting Irish hosting the entire tournament their odds were even better. Unfortunately, the team laid an egg in the opening game against Penn State and lost 3–6.

Notre Dame could only watch and hope but when St. Lawrence won the ECAC Tournament it appeared that the door had shut on Notre Dame's season. In less than 24 hours everything changed; St. Lawrence's head coach tested positive for COVID-19 the following day and the team was forced to withdraw from the national tournament. The ECAC automatic bid was given to Quinnipiac (who were likely to make the tournament anyway), opening up one more spot in the bracket. The final open spot came down essentially to how schools performed against the best teams in their conference; Notre Dame splitting their season series against Michigan and Minnesota gave them the edge and the Fighting Irish received the final at-large bid.

While the team's selection was not without controversy, the Fighting Irish lost the ability to prove they were the right choice when members of the team tested positive for COVID-19. Because their withdrawal happened two days before the game had been scheduled, there was no opportunity for another team to be installed as a replacement and the match was declared a 'no contest'.

Brady Bjork, Ryan Carmichael and Christian DiCesare sat out the season.

== Departures ==
Player	Position	Nationality	Cause
Cal Burke	Forward	United States	Graduation (signed with Colorado Eagles)
Tory Dello	Defenseman	United States	Graduation (signed with Grand Rapids Griffins)
Mike O'Leary	Forward	Canada	Graduation (signed with Hartford Wolf Pack)
Jack MacNab	Forward	United States	Transfer to Holy Cross
Cale Morris	Goaltender	United States	Graduation (signed with Rockford IceHogs)
Cam Morrison	Forward	Canada	Graduation (signed with Chicago Blackhawks)

== Recruiting ==
Player	Position	Nationality	Age	Notes
Brady Bjork	Forward	United States	21	Mequon, WI
Jake Boltmann	Defenseman	United States	18	Edina, MN; selected 80th overall in 2020
Zach Plucinski	Defenseman	United States	20	Eagle River, AK
Ryder Rolston	Forward	United States	18	Birmingham, MI; selected 139th overall in 2020
Grant Silianoff	Forward	United States	19	Edina, MN
Landon Slaggert	Forward	United States	18	South Bend, IN; selected 79th overall in 2020

== Roster ==
As of January 3, 2021.

No.	Nat.	Player	Class	Pos	Height	Weight	DoB	Hometown	Previous team	NHL rights
1	(United States)	Dylan St. Cyr	Senior	G	5' 9" (1.75 m)	170 lb (77 kg)	1999-05-23	Northville, Michigan	USNTDP (USHL)	—
2	(United States)	Nate Clurman (C)	Junior	D	6' 2" (1.88 m)	200 lb (91 kg)	1998-05-08	Boulder, Colorado	Langley Rivermen (BCHL)	COL, 161st overall 2016
3	(United States)	Ryan Carmichael	Sophomore	D	6' 2" (1.88 m)	191 lb (87 kg)	1999-03-03	Greenwich, Connecticut	Lincoln Stars (USHL)	—
4	(United States)	Nick Leivermann	Junior	D	5' 11" (1.8 m)	180 lb (82 kg)	1998-09-14	Eden Prairie, Minnesota	Penticton Vees (BCHL)	COL, 187th overall 2017
5	(United States)	Matt Hellickson (A)	Senior	D	6' 1" (1.85 m)	192 lb (87 kg)	1998-03-21	Rogers, Minnesota	Sioux City Musketeers (USHL)	NJD, 214th overall 2017
6	(United States)	Jake Boltmann	Freshman	D	6' 1" (1.85 m)	196 lb (89 kg)	2001-10-19	Edina, Minnesota	Lincoln Stars (USHL)	CGY, 80th overall 2020
8	(United States)	Matt Steeves	Senior	F	6' 0" (1.83 m)	193 lb (88 kg)	1997-10-04	Eden Prairie, Minnesota	Muskegon Lumberjacks (USHL)	—
9	(United States)	Grant Silianoff	Freshman	F	5' 11" (1.8 m)	167 lb (76 kg)	2001-01-04	Edina, Minnesota	Cedar Rapids RoughRiders (USHL)	—
10	(United States)	Cam Burke	Junior	F	5' 9" (1.75 m)	175 lb (79 kg)	1999-01-08	Boxborough, Massachusetts	Sioux Falls Stampede (USHL)	—
12	(United States)	Ryder Rolston	Freshman	F	6' 2" (1.88 m)	175 lb (79 kg)	2001-10-31	Birmingham, Michigan	Waterloo Black Hawks (USHL)	COL, 139th overall 2020
13	(United States)	Colin Theisen (A)	Senior	F	6' 0" (1.83 m)	181 lb (82 kg)	1997-04-24	Monroe, Michigan	Dubuque Fighting Saints (USHL)	—
14	(Canada)	Jesse Lansdell	Sophomore	F	5' 11" (1.8 m)	181 lb (82 kg)	1998-08-05	Surrey, British Columbia	Vernon Vipers (BCHL)	—
15	(United States)	Michael Graham	Junior	F	6' 2" (1.88 m)	195 lb (88 kg)	1997-11-27	Eden Prairie, Minnesota	Muskegon Lumberjacks (USHL)	—
16	(United States)	Alex Steeves	Junior	F	5' 10" (1.78 m)	187 lb (85 kg)	1999-12-10	Eden Prairie, Minnesota	Dubuque Fighting Saints (USHL)	—
17	(United States)	Pierce Crawford (A)	Senior	F	5' 9" (1.75 m)	175 lb (79 kg)	1997-06-23	Park Ridge, Illinois	Youngstown Phantoms (USHL)	—
18	(United States)	Graham Slaggert	Junior	F	6' 0" (1.83 m)	185 lb (84 kg)	1999-04-06	South Bend, Indiana	Cedar Rapids RoughRiders (USHL)	—
19	(United States)	Landon Slaggert	Freshman	F	6' 0" (1.83 m)	185 lb (84 kg)	2002-06-25	South Bend, Indiana	USNTDP (USHL)	CHI, 79th overall 2020
20	(United States)	Jake Pivonka	Junior	F	6' 0" (1.83 m)	198 lb (90 kg)	2000-02-28	Naperville, Illinois	USNTDP (USHL)	NYI, 103rd overall 2018
21	(United States)	Max Ellis	Sophomore	F	5' 9" (1.75 m)	160 lb (73 kg)	2000-01-18	Plymouth, Michigan	Muskegon Lumberjacks (USHL)	—
22	(United States)	Jack MacNab	Sophomore	F	6' 3" (1.91 m)	197 lb (89 kg)	1998-07-03	Indianapolis, Indiana	Central Illinois Flying Aces (USHL)	—
23	(United States)	Brady Bjork	Senior	F	6' 1" (1.85 m)	173 lb (78 kg)	1999-05-17	Mequon, Wisconsin	St. Cloud Norsemen (NAHL)	—
24	(United States)	Spencer Stastney	Junior	D	5' 11" (1.8 m)	187 lb (85 kg)	2000-01-04	Mequon, Wisconsin	USNTDP (USHL)	NSH, 131st overall 2018
25	(United States)	Solag Bakich	Sophomore	F	6' 0" (1.83 m)	189 lb (86 kg)	1998-01-08	Dallas, Texas	Waterloo Black Hawks (USHL)	—
26	(United States)	Zach Plucinski	Freshman	D	6' 1" (1.85 m)	206 lb (93 kg)	2000-07-26	Eagle River, Alaska	Omaha Lancers (USHL)	—
27	(United States)	Trevor Janicke	Sophomore	F	5' 10" (1.78 m)	194 lb (88 kg)	2000-12-25	Maple Grove, Minnesota	Central Illinois Flying Aces (USHL)	ANA, 132nd overall 2019
28	(United States)	Christian DiCesare	Sophomore	D	6' 1" (1.85 m)	205 lb (93 kg)	1998-03-28	Morristown, New Jersey	Omaha Lancers (USHL)	—
29	(United States)	Charlie Raith	Junior	D	5' 9" (1.75 m)	170 lb (77 kg)	1997-04-30	Winnetka, Illinois	Central Illinois Flying Aces (USHL)	—
30	(United States)	Ryan Bischel	Sophomore	G	6' 1" (1.85 m)	180 lb (82 kg)	1999-07-05	Medina, Minnesota	Fargo Force (USHL)	—
33	(United States)	Nick Sanford	Senior	G	6' 1" (1.85 m)	189 lb (86 kg)	1996-12-15	Morristown, New Jersey	Boston Junior Bruins (USPHL)	—

== Standings ==
2020–21 Big Ten ice hockey Standings
	Conference record											Overall record					
	GP	W	L	T	OTW	OTL	3/SW	PTS	PT%	GF	GA	GP	W	L	T	GF	GA
#8 Wisconsin †	24	17	6	1	1	1	0	52	.722	92	52	31	20	10	1	118	80
#7 Minnesota *	22	16	6	0	0	0	0	48	.727	69	44	31	24	7	0	117	64
#9 Michigan	20	11	9	0	1	0	0	32	.550	69	45	26	15	10	1	91	51
#17 Notre Dame	24	12	10	2	1	2	2	41	.542	65	53	29	14	13	2	84	78
Penn State	18	7	11	0	2	1	0	20	.389	48	68	22	10	12	0	65	81
Ohio State	22	6	16	0	0	2	0	20	.273	39	82	27	7	19	1	53	101
Michigan State	22	5	16	1	2	0	0	15	.250	32	70	27	7	18	2	40	77
Championship: March 16, 2021 † indicates conference regular season champion * indicates conference tournament champion Rankings: USCHO.com Top 20 Poll

== Schedule and results ==
Date	Time	Opponent^{#}	Rank^{#}	Site	TV	Decision	Result	Attendance	Record
Regular season
November 13	7:06 PM	vs. Wisconsin	#20	Compton Family Ice Arena • Notre Dame, Indiana	NBCSN	St. Cyr	L 0–2	0	0–1–0 (0–1–0)
November 14	7:06 PM	vs. Wisconsin	#20	Compton Family Ice Arena • Notre Dame, Indiana	NHL Network	St. Cyr	L 3–5	0	0–2–0 (0–2–0)
November 27	7:05 PM	at #4 Michigan		Yost Ice Arena • Ann Arbor, Michigan		Bischel	W 3–2	0	1–2–0 (1–2–0)
November 28	7:04 PM	at #4 Michigan		Yost Ice Arena • Ann Arbor, Michigan		Bischel	W 2–1	0	2–2–0 (2–2–0)
December 3	7:06 PM	vs. #20 Arizona State*	#16	Compton Family Ice Arena • Notre Dame, Indiana	NHL Network	Bischel	L 3–6	0	2–3–0
December 4	7:06 PM	vs. #20 Arizona State*	#16	Compton Family Ice Arena • Notre Dame, Indiana	NBCSN	St. Cyr	W 5–4	0	3–3–0
December 12	7:06 PM	vs. #14 Ohio State	#15	Compton Family Ice Arena • Notre Dame, Indiana	NBCSN	St. Cyr	W 3–0	0	4–3–0 (3–2–0)
December 13	5:06 PM	vs. #14 Ohio State	#15	Compton Family Ice Arena • Notre Dame, Indiana	NBCSN	St. Cyr	W 2–3	0	4–4–0 (3–3–0)
December 19	6:36 PM	vs. Michigan State	#16	Compton Family Ice Arena • Notre Dame, Indiana	NBCSN	Bischel	T 1–1 ^{SOW}	0	4–4–1 (3–3–1)
December 20	5:06 PM	vs. Michigan State	#16	Compton Family Ice Arena • Notre Dame, Indiana	NBC Sports Chi	Bischel	L 3–4 ^{OT}	0	4–5–1 (3–4–1)
January 9	6:36 PM	vs. Arizona State*	#18	Compton Family Ice Arena • Notre Dame, Indiana		St. Cyr	W 5–4	74	5–5–1
January 10	5:06 PM	vs. Arizona State*	#18	Compton Family Ice Arena • Notre Dame, Indiana		Bischel	L 3–5	0	5–6–1
January 15	7:05 PM	at #1 Minnesota		3M Arena at Mariucci • Minneapolis, Minnesota		Bischel	W 3–2	116	6–6–1 (4–4–1)
January 16	5:00 PM	at #1 Minnesota		3M Arena at Mariucci • Minneapolis, Minnesota		St. Cyr	W 2–1	0	7–6–1 (5–4–1)
January 21	6:36 PM	vs. #8 Michigan	#16	Compton Family Ice Arena • Notre Dame, Indiana		St. Cyr	L 1–5	136	7–7–1 (5–5–1)
January 22	6:36 PM	vs. #8 Michigan	#16	Compton Family Ice Arena • Notre Dame, Indiana		St. Cyr	L 1–3	138	7–8–1 (5–6–1)
January 28	6:04 PM	at Penn State		Pegula Ice Arena • University Park, Pennsylvania		St. Cyr	L 1–2 ^{OT}	175	7–9–1 (5–7–1)
January 29	6:04 PM	at Penn State		Pegula Ice Arena • University Park, Pennsylvania		St. Cyr	W 3–2 ^{OT}	194	8–9–1 (6–7–1)
February 5	4:34 PM	at Ohio State		Value City Arena • Columbus, Ohio		St. Cyr	W 6–1	0	9–9–1 (7–7–1)
February 6	1:34 PM	at Ohio State		Value City Arena • Columbus, Ohio		St. Cyr	W 8–1	0	10–9–1 (8–7–1)
February 12	7:36 PM	vs. #5 Minnesota		Compton Family Ice Arena • Notre Dame, Indiana		St. Cyr	L 0–3	79	10–10–1 (8–8–1)
February 13	5:36 PM	vs. #5 Minnesota		Compton Family Ice Arena • Notre Dame, Indiana		Bischel	L 0–3	80	10–11–1 (8–9–1)
February 19	8:04 PM	at #5 Wisconsin		Kohl Center • Madison, Wisconsin		St. Cyr	L 4–2	0	10–12–1 (8–10–1)
February 20	5:04 PM	at #5 Wisconsin		Kohl Center • Madison, Wisconsin		St. Cyr	T 5–5 ^{SOW}	0	10–12–2 (8–10–2)
February 26	6:00 PM	at Michigan State		Munn Ice Arena • East Lansing, Michigan		St. Cyr	W 2–0	103	11–12–2 (9–10–2)
February 27	3:00 PM	at Michigan State		Munn Ice Arena • East Lansing, Michigan		St. Cyr	W 2–0	103	12–12–2 (10–10–2)
March 5	7:51 PM	vs. Penn State		Compton Family Ice Arena • Notre Dame, Indiana		St. Cyr	W 5–2	104	13–12–2 (11–10–2)
March 6	5:36 PM	vs. Penn State		Compton Family Ice Arena • Notre Dame, Indiana		St. Cyr	W 7–1	113	14–12–2 (12–10–2)
Big Ten Tournament
March 14	12:05 PM	vs. Penn State*	#19	Compton Family Ice Arena • Notre Dame, Indiana (Big Ten Quarterfinal)	BTN	Bischel	L 3–6	166	14–13–2
NCAA Tournament
March 27	1:00 PM	vs. #2 Boston College	#18	Times Union Center • Albany, New York (NCAA Northeast Regional semifinal)	ESPNews	Cancelled due to COVID-19 protocols			
*Non-conference game. ^{#}Rankings from USCHO.com Poll. All times are in Eastern Time.

== Scoring statistics ==
Name	Position	Games	Goals	Assists	Points	PIM
Alex Steeves	F	29	15	17	32	8
Graham Slaggert	C	27	7	18	25	10
Landon Slaggert	C/LW	25	8	14	22	10
Nick Leivermann	D	29	5	12	17	6
Max Ellis	RW	24	5	11	16	8
Colin Theisen	LW	27	8	6	14	49
Spencer Stastney	D	29	5	7	12	6
Jesse Lansdell	F	28	4	7	11	10
Trevor Janicke	C/RW	29	4	6	10	4
Michael Graham	D	18	2	8	10	8
Jake Pivonka	C	29	2	7	9	8
Grant Silianoff	RW	28	4	4	8	2
Matt Hellickson	D	29	1	7	8	10
Nate Clurman	D	27	4	3	7	31
Solag Bakich	F	28	4	3	7	14
Ryder Rolston	C/W	28	1	5	6	31
Pierce Crawford	F	27	1	3	4	2
Cam Burke	C	14	1	2	3	2
Matt Steeves	F	12	2	0	2	2
Zach Plucinski	D	20	1	0	1	10
Charlie Raith	D	25	0	1	1	4
Nick Sanford	G	2	0	0	0	0
Ryan Bischel	G	9	0	0	0	0
Jake Boltmann	D	19	0	0	0	10
Dylan St. Cyr	G	22	0	0	0	0
Bench	-	29	-	-	-	4
Total			84	141	225	249

== Goaltending statistics ==
Name	Games	Minutes	Wins	Losses	Ties	Goals against	Saves	Shut outs	SV %	GAA
Nick Sanford	2	8:51	0	0	0	0	2	0	1.000	0.00
Dylan St. Cyr	22	1254	11	9	1	51	597	3	.921	2.44
Ryan Bischel	9	480	3	4	1	23	186	0	.890	2.87
Empty Net	-	14	-	-	-	4	-	-	-	-
Total	29	1758	14	13	2	78	785	3	.910	2.66

== Rankings ==
Poll	Week																					
Poll	Pre	1	2	3	4	5	6	7	8	9	10	11	12	13	14	15	16	17	18	19	20	21 (Final)
USCHO.com	20	NR	NR	16	15	16	18	18	18	NR	16	NR	NR	NR	NR	NR	NR	19	20	18	-	17
USA Today	NR	NR	NR	13	15	NR	NR	NR	NR	NR	NR	NR	NR	NR	NR	NR	NR	NR	NR	NR	NR	NR

USCHO did not release a poll in week 20.

== Awards and honors ==
Player	Award	Ref
Spencer Stastney	Big Ten Second Team	
Alex Steeves	Big Ten Second Team	

== Players drafted into the NHL ==
=== 2021 NHL entry draft ===
Round	Pick	Player	NHL team
3	66	Sasha Pastujov^{†}	Anaheim Ducks
7	195	Justin Janicke^{†}	Seattle Kraken

† incoming freshman
