= 2020–21 Michigan State Spartans men's ice hockey season =

Ice hockey season

- Conference: 7th Big Ten
- Home ice: Munn Ice Arena

Rankings
- USCHO: NR
- USA Today: NR

Record
- Overall: 7–18–2
- Conference: 5–16–1–2–0–0
- Home: 5–9–1
- Road: 2–8–1
- Neutral: 0–1–0

Coaches and captains
- Head coach: Danton Cole
- Assistant coaches: Chris Luongo; Joe Exter; Jim Slater
- Captain(s): Tommy Apap; Tommy Miller
- Alternate captain(s): Dennis Cesana; Mitch Lewandowski

The 2020–21 Michigan State Spartans men's ice hockey season was the 79th season of play for the program and the 31st season in the Big Ten Conference. The Spartans represented Michigan State University and were coached by Danton Cole, in his 4th season.

== Season ==
As a result of the ongoing COVID-19 pandemic the entire college ice hockey season was delayed. Because the NCAA had previously announced that all winter sports athletes would retain whatever eligibility they possessed through at least the following year, none of Michigan State's players would lose a season of play. However, the NCAA also approved a change in its transfer regulations that would allow players to transfer and play immediately rather than having to sit out a season, as the rules previously required.

In the first half of their season, Michigan State could find very little consistency but were able to hold their own in the Big Ten. Up until mid-January the team had a .500 record and had a chance to make something of their abbreviated season. Unfortunately, from the 15th onward, the team's offense collapsed MSU wasn't able to score more than two goals in a game after January 9 and went 2–13 to end their season The Spartans' defense was not a problem most games but with so few goals scored, the team sank to the bottom of the conference standings. MSU's offense was so paltry that the team averaged less than one and a half goals per game for the entire season (1.48) and were shut out in 6 of their 27 games.

Jon Mor sat out the season.

== Departures ==
Player	Position	Nationality	Cause
Damian Chrcek	Defenseman	United States	Graduation
Butrus Ghafari	Defenseman	United States	Graduation (Signed with Toledo Walleye)
Patrick Khodorenko	Forward	United States	Graduation (Signed with New York Rangers)
Logan Lambdin	Forward	United States	Graduation (Signed with Kalamazoo Wings)
John Lethemon	Goaltender	United States	Graduation (Signed with Greenville Swamp Rabbits)
Jerad Rosburg	Defenseman	United States	Graduation (Signed with Dallas Stars)
Sam Saliba	Forward	United States	Graduation
Anthony Scarsella	Defenseman	United States	Graduation
Wojciech Stachowiak	Forward	Poland	Signed professional contract (ERC Ingolstadt)
Spencer Wright	Goaltender	United States	Graduation

== Recruiting ==
Player	Position	Nationality	Age	Notes
Pierce Charleson	Goaltender	Canada	20	Aurora, ON
Charlie Combs	Forward	United States	24	St. Louis, MO; transfer from Bemidji State
Powell Connor	Defenseman	Canada	20	Vernon, BC
Cal Dybicz	Defenseman	United States	20	Elk Grove Village, IL
Aiden Gallacher	Defenseman	United States	20	Rochester Hills, MI
Kyle Haskins	Forward	United States	20	Huntington, VA
A. J. Hodges	Forward	United States	19	Littleton, CO
Jon Mor	Goaltender	United States	20	Highland Park, IL
Nash Nienhuis	Defenseman	Canada	20	Sarnia, ON
Kristóf Papp	Forward	Hungary	19	Budapest, HUN

== Roster ==
As of January 3, 2021.

No.	Nat.	Player	Class	Pos	Height	Weight	DoB	Hometown	Previous team	NHL rights
1	(United States)	Drew DeRidder	Junior	G	5' 11" (1.8 m)	175 lb (79 kg)	2000-05-01	Fenton, Michigan	USNTDP (USHL)	—
2	(United States)	Aiden Gallacher	Freshman	D	6' 1" (1.85 m)	200 lb (91 kg)	2000-03-20	Rochester Hills, Michigan	Youngstown Phantoms (USHL)	—
4	(Canada)	Nash Nienhuis	Freshman	D	5' 10" (1.78 m)	176 lb (80 kg)	1999-12-05	Sarnia, Ontario	Omaha Lancers (USHL)	—
5	(Canada)	Powell Connor	Freshman	D	6' 2" (1.88 m)	183 lb (83 kg)	2000-05-04	Vernon, British Columbia	Trail Smoke Eaters (BCHL)	—
6	(United States)	Cal Dybicz	Freshman	D	6' 1" (1.85 m)	181 lb (82 kg)	2000-07-16	Elk Grove Village, Illinois	Tri-City Storm (USHL)	—
7	(United States)	Charlie Combs	Graduate	F	5' 6" (1.68 m)	181 lb (82 kg)	1996-07-13	St. Louis, Missouri	Bemidji State (WCHA)	—
8	(United States)	Cole Krygier	Junior	D	6' 2" (1.88 m)	196 lb (89 kg)	2000-05-05	Novi, Michigan	Lincoln Stars (USHL)	FLA, 201st overall 2018
9	(United States)	Mitchell Lewandowski (A)	Senior	F	5' 9" (1.75 m)	178 lb (81 kg)	1998-04-17	Clarkston, Michigan	Chicago Steel (USHL)	—
10	(United States)	A. J. Hodges	Freshman	F	6' 0" (1.83 m)	184 lb (83 kg)	2001-08-24	Littleton, Colorado	Sioux City Musketeers (USHL)	—
11	(United States)	Tommy Apap (C)	Senior	F	6' 1" (1.85 m)	206 lb (93 kg)	1996-02-27	Bloomfield Hills, Michigan	Youngstown Phantoms (USHL)	—
12	(United States)	Tommy Miller (C)	Senior	D	6' 1" (1.85 m)	191 lb (87 kg)	1999-03-06	West Bloomfield, Michigan	USNTDP (USHL)	—
13	(Hungary)	Kristóf Papp	Freshman	F	5' 11" (1.8 m)	174 lb (79 kg)	2001-06-27	Budapest, Hungary	Des Moines Buccaneers (USHL)	—
14	(United States)	Adam Goodsir	Junior	F	6' 0" (1.83 m)	196 lb (89 kg)	1998-09-22	Okemos, Michigan	Tri-City Storm (USHL)	—
15	(United States)	Christian Krygier	Junior	D	6' 2" (1.88 m)	185 lb (84 kg)	2000-05-05	Novi, Michigan	Lincoln Stars (USHL)	NYI, 196th overall 2018
16	(United States)	Brody Stevens	Senior	F	5' 10" (1.78 m)	193 lb (88 kg)	1997-04-26	Ann Arbor, Michigan	Green Bay Gamblers (USHL)	—
17	(United States)	Kyle Haskins	Freshman	F	5' 10" (1.78 m)	190 lb (86 kg)	2000-02-16	Huntington, Vermont	Waterloo Black Hawks (USHL)	—
19	(Switzerland)	Nicolas Müller	Sophomore	F	6' 0" (1.83 m)	182 lb (83 kg)	1999-06-21	Arisdorf, Switzerland	Modo J20 (J20 SuperElit)	—
20	(United States)	Josh Nodler	Sophomore	F	5' 10" (1.78 m)	193 lb (88 kg)	2001-04-27	Oak Park, Michigan	Fargo Force (USHL)	CGY, 150th overall 2019
21	(United States)	Jake Smith	Senior	F	5' 10" (1.78 m)	188 lb (85 kg)	1996-11-28	East Amherst, New York	Chilliwack Chiefs (BCHL)	—
22	(United States)	Dennis Cesana (A)	Junior	D	5' 9" (1.75 m)	182 lb (83 kg)	1998-04-04	Providence, Rhode Island	Brooks Bandits (AJHL)	—
23	(United States)	Jagger Joshua	Sophomore	F	6' 2" (1.88 m)	200 lb (91 kg)	1999-03-29	Dearborn, Michigan	Muskegon Lumberjacks (USHL)	—
24	(United States)	Austin Kamer	Senior	F	5' 10" (1.78 m)	181 lb (82 kg)	1996-05-23	Grand Rapids, Michigan	Lone Star Brahmas (NAHL)	—
27	(United States)	Mitchell Mattson	Junior	F	6' 4" (1.93 m)	205 lb (93 kg)	1998-01-02	Grand Rapids, Minnesota	Sioux Falls Stampede (USHL)	CGY, 126th overall 2016
28	(Canada)	Gianluca Esteves	Senior	F	5' 9" (1.75 m)	172 lb (78 kg)	1997-01-29	Winnipeg, Manitoba	Aston Rebels (NAHL)	—
29	(Canada)	Pierce Charleson	Freshman	G	6' 2" (1.88 m)	186 lb (84 kg)	2000-02-27	Aurora, Ontario	Brooks Bandits (AJHL)	—
30	(United States)	Jon Mor	Freshman	G	6' 2" (1.88 m)	190 lb (86 kg)	2000-07-20	Highland Park, Illinois	Langley Rivermen (BCHL)	—

== Standings ==
2020–21 Big Ten ice hockey Standings
	Conference record											Overall record					
	GP	W	L	T	OTW	OTL	3/SW	PTS	PT%	GF	GA	GP	W	L	T	GF	GA
#8 Wisconsin †	24	17	6	1	1	1	0	52	.722	92	52	31	20	10	1	118	80
#7 Minnesota *	22	16	6	0	0	0	0	48	.727	69	44	31	24	7	0	117	64
#9 Michigan	20	11	9	0	1	0	0	32	.550	69	45	26	15	10	1	91	51
#17 Notre Dame	24	12	10	2	1	2	2	41	.542	65	53	29	14	13	2	84	78
Penn State	18	7	11	0	2	1	0	20	.389	48	68	22	10	12	0	65	81
Ohio State	22	6	16	0	0	2	0	20	.273	39	82	27	7	19	1	53	101
Michigan State	22	5	16	1	2	0	0	15	.250	32	70	27	7	18	2	40	77
Championship: March 16, 2021 † indicates conference regular season champion * indicates conference tournament champion Rankings: USCHO.com Top 20 Poll

== Schedule and results ==
Date	Time	Opponent^{#}	Rank^{#}	Site	TV	Decision	Result	Attendance	Record
Regular season
November 19	6:04 PM	vs. Arizona State*		Munn Ice Arena • East Lansing, Michigan	BTN	DeRidder	T 1–1 ^{OT}	100	0–0–1
November 20	6:04 PM	vs. Arizona State*		Munn Ice Arena • East Lansing, Michigan		DeRidder	W 2–0	100	1–0–1
November 28	5:30 PM	at #10 Ohio State		Value City Arena • Columbus, Ohio		DeRidder	W 3–2 ^{OT}	0	2–0–1 (1–0–0)
November 29	5:30 PM	at #10 Ohio State		Value City Arena • Columbus, Ohio		DeRidder	L 2–4	0	2–1–1 (1–1–0)
December 3	8:00 PM	vs. #5 Minnesota		Munn Ice Arena • East Lansing, Michigan	FSD, FSN	DeRidder	L 1–3	100	2–2–1 (1–2–0)
December 4	8:05 PM	vs. #5 Minnesota		Munn Ice Arena • East Lansing, Michigan	FSD, FSN	DeRidder	L 2–4	88	2–3–1 (1–3–0)
December 19	6:36 PM	at #16 Notre Dame		Compton Family Ice Arena • Notre Dame, Indiana	NBCSN	DeRidder	T 1–1 ^{OT}	0	2–3–2 (1–3–1)
December 20	5:06 PM	at #16 Notre Dame		Compton Family Ice Arena • Notre Dame, Indiana	NBCSChi	DeRidder	W 4–3 ^{OT}	0	3–3–2 (2–3–1)
January 3	3:00 PM	vs. Penn State		Munn Ice Arena • East Lansing, Michigan		DeRidder	L 0–1	125	3–4–2 (2–4–1)
January 4	3:00 PM	vs. Penn State		Munn Ice Arena • East Lansing, Michigan		DeRidder	L 5–1	100	4–4–2 (3–4–1)
January 8	7:04 PM	at #9 Michigan		Yost Ice Arena • Ann Arbor, Michigan		DeRidder	L 0–9	100	4–5–2 (3–5–1)
January 9	4:30 PM	vs. #9 Michigan		Munn Ice Arena • East Lansing, Michigan		DeRidder	W 3–2	100	5–5–2 (4–5–1)
January 15	6:04 PM	at Penn State		Pegula Ice Arena • University Park, Pennsylvania		DeRidder	L 2–3 ^{OT}	177	5–6–2 (4–6–1)
January 16	3:04 PM	at Penn State		Pegula Ice Arena • University Park, Pennsylvania		DeRidder	L 1–3	195	5–7–2 (4–7–1)
January 23	4:00 PM	vs. Ohio State		Munn Ice Arena • East Lansing, Michigan	BTN	DeRidder	L 1–5	123	5–8–2 (4–8–1)
January 24	4:00 PM	vs. Ohio State		Munn Ice Arena • East Lansing, Michigan		DeRidder	W 2–0	101	6–8–2 (5–8–1)
January 29	8:04 PM	vs. #13 Wisconsin		Kohl Center • Madison, Wisconsin		DeRidder	L 0–6	0	6–9–2 (5–9–1)
January 30	4:04 PM	vs. #13 Wisconsin		Kohl Center • Madison, Wisconsin		DeRidder	L 1–4	0	6–10–2 (5–10–1)
February 14	3:00 PM	vs. Wisconsin*		Munn Ice Arena • East Lansing, Michigan		DeRidder	L 2–3	101	6–11–2
February 15	5:00 PM	vs. Wisconsin*		Munn Ice Arena • East Lansing, Michigan		DeRidder	W 2–1	81	7–11–2
February 19	8:05 PM	at #4 Minnesota		3M Arena at Mariucci • Minneapolis, Minnesota		DeRidder	L 2–4	0	7–12–2 (5–11–1)
February 20	6:05 PM	at #4 Minnesota		3M Arena at Mariucci • Minneapolis, Minnesota		DeRidder	L 1–5	0	7–13–2 (5–12–1)
February 26	6:00 PM	vs. Notre Dame		Munn Ice Arena • East Lansing, Michigan		Charleson	L 0–2	103	7–14–2 (5–13–1)
February 27	3:00 PM	vs. Notre Dame		Munn Ice Arena • East Lansing, Michigan		DeRidder	L 0–2	0	7–15–2 (5–14–1)
March 5	4:00 PM	vs. #5 Wisconsin		Munn Ice Arena • East Lansing, Michigan		DeRidder	L 0–4	0	7–16–2 (5–15–1)
March 6	2:30 PM	vs. #5 Wisconsin		Munn Ice Arena • East Lansing, Michigan	BTN	Charleson	L 1–2	0	7–17–2 (5–16–1)
Big Ten Tournament
March 14	4:05 PM	vs. #4 Minnesota*		Compton Family Ice Arena • Notre Dame, Indiana (Big Ten Quarterfinal)	BTN	Charleson	L 1–2 ^{OT}	134	7–18–2
*Non-conference game. ^{#}Rankings from USCHO.com Poll. All times are in Eastern Time.

== Scoring statistics ==
Name	Position	Games	Goals	Assists	Points	PIM
Mitchell Lewandowski	LW	27	6	7	13	28
Dennis Cesana	D	27	2	10	12	10
Josh Nodler	C/RW	27	3	8	11	0
Charlie Combs	LW	23	6	4	10	21
Tommy Apap	F	25	5	4	9	8
Nicolas Müller	C/RW	26	2	6	8	8
Jagger Joshua	F	26	4	1	5	41
Kyle Haskins	F	27	1	4	5	10
Mitchell Mattson	C	21	2	2	4	2
Brody Stevens	C	27	2	2	4	18
Adam Goodsir	F	25	1	3	4	10
Tommy Miller	D	27	1	3	4	4
Nash Nienhuis	D	25	0	4	4	2
Kristóf Papp	C	25	0	4	4	0
Gianluca Esteves	F	23	2	1	3	4
Cole Krygier	D	25	2	1	3	25
Christian Krygier	D	26	1	2	3	54
A. J. Hodges	F	22	0	2	2	0
Aiden Gallacher	D	26	0	2	2	23
Austin Kamer	RW	7	0	1	1	0
Calvin Dybicz	D	1	0	0	0	10
Pierce Charleson	G	7	0	0	0	0
Jake Smith	F	10	0	0	0	4
Powell Connor	D	15	0	0	0	2
Drew DeRidder	G	24	0	0	0	0
Bench	-	-	-	-	-	8
Total			40	71	111	282

== Goaltending statistics ==
Name	Games	Minutes	Wins	Losses	Ties	Goals against	Saves	Shut outs	SV %	GAA
Pierce Charleson	7	326	0	3	0	14	210	0	.938	2.57
Drew DeRidder	24	1304	7	15	2	60	723	2	.923	2.76
Empty Net	-	14	-	-	-	3	-	-	-	-
Total	27	1646	7	18	2	77	933	2	.924	2.81

== Rankings ==
Poll	Week																					
Poll	Pre	1	2	3	4	5	6	7	8	9	10	11	12	13	14	15	16	17	18	19	20	21 (Final)
USCHO.com	NR	NR	NR	NR	NR	NR	NR	NR	NR	NR	NR	NR	NR	NR	NR	NR	NR	NR	NR	NR	-	NR
USA Today	NR	NR	NR	NR	NR	NR	NR	NR	NR	NR	NR	NR	NR	NR	NR	NR	NR	NR	NR	NR	NR	NR

USCHO did not release a poll in week 20.
