= 2020–21 Wisconsin Badgers men's ice hockey season =

American college ice hockey season

Big Ten, Champion NCAA Tournament, Regional semifinal
- Conference: 1st Big Ten
- Home ice: LaBahn Arena

Rankings
- USCHO: 8
- USA Today: 8

Record
- Overall: 20–10–1
- Conference: 17–6–1–1–1–0
- Home: 10–5–1
- Road: 9–3–0
- Neutral: 1–2–0

Coaches and captains
- Head coach: Tony Granato
- Assistant coaches: Mark Strobel; Mark Osiecki; Brad Winchester
- Captain: Ty Emberson
- Alternate captain(s): Tarek Baker; Tyler Inamoto; Ty Pelton-Byce

The 2020–21 Wisconsin Badgers men's ice hockey season was the 72nd season of play for the program and the 21st season in the Big Ten Conference. The Badgers represented the University of Wisconsin–Madison and were coached by Tony Granato, in his 5th season.

== Season ==
As a result of the ongoing COVID-19 pandemic the entire college ice hockey season was delayed. Because the NCAA had previously announced that all winter sports athletes would retain whatever eligibility they possessed through at least the following year, none of Wisconsin's players would lose a season of play. However, the NCAA also approved a change in its transfer regulations that would allow players to transfer and play immediately rather than having to sit out a season, as the rules previously required.

Wisconsin entered the season having to rely on an entirely new troop of goaltenders, having lost all of their netminders from the year before. That wasn't an unfortunate circumstance as the Badgers had been one of the worst teams in the nation in terms of goals allowed. Senior transfer Robbie Beydoun was the first goalie to start for the team and Wisconsin started well, winning four of their first six games (all against ranked teams). After getting embarrassed by Arizona State in late November, Tony Granato began rotating his starting goalies and the team responded by handing #1 Minnesota their first loss of the season. With the team beginning to fire on all cylinders, Cole Caufield came into his own and rocketed up the national scoring standings. Caufield's goal-scoring helped the Badgers win 13 out of 16 games and finish atop the Big Ten by .002. The drastic turnaround was the first time a team had gone from worst to first in any conference standings since Maine in 1995 (though that included 14 forfeited games).

As the top seed, Wisconsin received a bye into the Big Ten semifinals but, when they hit the ice, the team appeared to have lost some its steam. The Badgers had to twice recover from Penn State leads in the third period before dominating in the overtime session. The championship game versus Minnesota saw more loose play and the Gophers scored four goals in the second period to take a 4-goal edge. The Badgers tried to come back in the final frame, scoring three times but an empty-net goal sealed their defeat.

Despite the championship loss, Wisconsin was ranked 4th by the NCAA selection committee and given the top spot for the East Region in the NCAA Tournament. The Badgers opened against Bemidji State and for the third consecutive game they got off to a slow start. The Beavers scored twice in the first, including a goal with less than 20 seconds remaining. After Wisconsin cut the lead in half, BSU scored two more before the end of the second, including one off a terrible turnover by Beydoun. Cameron Rowe was in net to start the third but it didn't appear to make much difference as Bemidji State scored again to push their lead to four. Caufield scored twice in the third to try and spark a comeback but the deficit was too great and The Badgers' campaign ended on a 3–6 loss.

Ben Garrity sat out the season.

== Departures ==
Player	Position	Nationality	Cause
Jack Berry	Goaltender	United States	Graduation (signed with Pensacola Ice Flyers)
Johan Blomquist	Goaltender	Sweden	Graduation
Sean Dhooghe	Forward	United States	Transferred to Arizona State
Wyatt Kalynuk	Defenseman	Canada	Signed professional contract (Chicago Blackhawks)
Daniel Lebedeff	Goaltender	Finland	Signed professional contract (HPK)
Mick Messner	Forward	United States	Transferred to Merrimack
K'Andre Miller	Defenseman	United States	Signed professional contract (New York Rangers)
Alex Turcotte	Forward	United States	Signed professional contract (Los Angeles Kings)
Max Zimmer	Forward	United States	Graduation (signed with Charlotte Checkers)

== Recruiting ==
Player	Position	Nationality	Age	Notes
Robbie Beydoun	Goaltender	United States	23	Plymouth, MI; transfer from Michigan Tech
Mathieu De St. Phalle	Forward	United States	20	Glencoe, IL
Ben Garrity	Goaltender	United States	20	Rosemount, MN
Anthony Kehrer	Defenseman	Canada	18	Winnipeg, MB
Luke LaMaster	Defenseman	United States	20	Duluth, MN
Cameron Rowe	Goaltender	United States	19	Wilmette, IL
Sam Stange	Forward	United States	19	Eau Claire, WI; selected 97th overall in 2020

== Roster ==
As of August 31, 2020.

No.	Nat.	Player	Class	Pos	Height	Weight	DoB	Hometown	Previous team	NHL rights
3	(United States)	Sam Stange	Freshman	F	6' 1" (1.85 m)	200 lb (91 kg)	2001-04-20	Eau Claire, Wisconsin	Sioux Falls Stampede (USHL)	DET, 97th overall 2020
4	(Canada)	Dylan Holloway	Sophomore	F	6' 1" (1.85 m)	203 lb (92 kg)	2001-09-23	Bragg Creek, Alberta	Okotoks Oilers (AJHL)	EDM, 14th overall 2020
5	(United States)	Tyler Inamoto (A)	Senior	D	6' 2" (1.88 m)	198 lb (90 kg)	1999-05-06	Barrington, Illinois	USNTDP (USHL)	FLA, 133rd overall 2017
7	(United States)	Mike Vorlicky	Sophomore	D	6' 1" (1.85 m)	190 lb (86 kg)	2000-07-17	Edina, Minnesota	Edina High School (USHS–MN)	—
8	(United States)	Cole Caufield	Sophomore	F	5' 7" (1.7 m)	165 lb (75 kg)	2001-01-02	Stevens Point, Wisconsin	USNTDP (USHL)	MTL, 15th overall 2019
9	(Sweden)	Linus Weissbach	Senior	F	5' 9" (1.75 m)	177 lb (80 kg)	1998-04-19	Gothenburg, Sweden	Tri-City Storm (USHL)	BUF, 192nd overall 2017
11	(United States)	Jack Gorniak	Junior	F	5' 11" (1.8 m)	187 lb (85 kg)	1999-09-15	West Salem, Wisconsin	West Salem High School (USHS–WI)	MTL, 123rd overall 2018
13	(United States)	Roman Ahcan	Junior	F	5' 9" (1.75 m)	175 lb (79 kg)	1999-03-24	Savage, Minnesota	Cedar Rapids RoughRiders (USHL)	—
14	(Finland)	Jesper Peltonen	Junior	D	5' 10" (1.78 m)	179 lb (81 kg)	1998-06-08	Helsinki, Finland	Omaha Lancers (USHL)	—
15	(United States)	Mathieu De St. Phalle	Freshman	F	5' 9" (1.75 m)	160 lb (73 kg)	2000-03-20	Lake Forest, Illinois	Chicago Steel (USHL)	—
16	(United States)	Tarek Baker (A)	Senior	F	5' 10" (1.78 m)	190 lb (86 kg)	1997-02-22	Verona, Wisconsin	Sioux City Musketeers (USHL)	—
17	(United States)	Ty Pelton-Byce (A)	Senior	F	6' 2" (1.88 m)	195 lb (88 kg)	1997-04-14	Madison, Wisconsin	Harvard (ECAC)	—
18	(United States)	Owen Lindmark	Sophomore	F	6' 0" (1.83 m)	190 lb (86 kg)	2001-05-17	Naperville, Illinois	USNTDP (USHL)	FLA, 137th overall 2019
19	(United States)	Brock Caufield	Junior	F	5' 9" (1.75 m)	175 lb (79 kg)	1999-03-09	Stevens Point, Wisconsin	Green Bay Gamblers (USHL)	—
20	(United States)	Josh Ess	Senior	D	5' 11" (1.8 m)	187 lb (85 kg)	1999-04-03	Lakeville, Minnesota	Lakeville South High School (USHS–MN)	CHI, 215th overall 2017
21	(United States)	Ty Emberson (C)	Junior	D	6' 1" (1.85 m)	198 lb (90 kg)	2000-05-24	Eau Claire, Wisconsin	USNTDP (USHL)	ARI, 73rd overall 2018
23	(United States)	Jason Dhooghe	Senior	F	5' 7" (1.7 m)	165 lb (75 kg)	1997-03-15	Aurora, Illinois	Green Bay Gamblers (USHL)	—
24	(Canada)	Anthony Kehrer	Freshman	D	5' 11" (1.8 m)	196 lb (89 kg)	2002-03-04	Winnipeg, Manitoba	Sioux City Musketeers (USHL)	—
25	(United States)	Dominick Mersch	Junior	F	6' 0" (1.83 m)	193 lb (88 kg)	1998-12-16	Park Ridge, Illinois	Lincoln Stars (USHL)	—
26	(United States)	Luke LaMaster	Freshman	D	6' 0" (1.83 m)	187 lb (85 kg)	1999-10-17	Duluth, Minnesota	Sioux City Musketeers (USHL)	—
27	(United States)	Ryder Donovan	Sophomore	F	6' 3" (1.91 m)	203 lb (92 kg)	2000-10-04	Duluth, Minnesota	East High School (USHS–MN)	VGK, 110th overall 2019
28	(United States)	Shay Donovan	Sophomore	D	6' 3" (1.91 m)	190 lb (86 kg)	1998-05-26	Duluth, Minnesota	Wilkes-Barre/Scranton Knights (NAHL)	—
29	(United States)	Ben Garrity	Freshman	G	6' 2" (1.88 m)	184 lb (83 kg)	2000-01-20	Rosemount, Minnesota	Minot Minotauros (NAHL)	—
30	(United States)	Robbie Beydoun	Graduate	G	6' 0" (1.83 m)	185 lb (84 kg)	1996-10-01	Plymouth, Michigan	Michigan Tech (WCHA)	—
31	(United States)	Cameron Rowe	Freshman	G	6' 3" (1.91 m)	212 lb (96 kg)	2001-06-01	Wilmette, Illinois	Des Moines Buccaneers (USHL)	—

== Standings ==
2020–21 Big Ten ice hockey Standings
	Conference record											Overall record					
	GP	W	L	T	OTW	OTL	3/SW	PTS	PT%	GF	GA	GP	W	L	T	GF	GA
#8 Wisconsin †	24	17	6	1	1	1	0	52	.722	92	52	31	20	10	1	118	80
#7 Minnesota *	22	16	6	0	0	0	0	48	.727	69	44	31	24	7	0	117	64
#9 Michigan	20	11	9	0	1	0	0	32	.550	69	45	26	15	10	1	91	51
#17 Notre Dame	24	12	10	2	1	2	2	41	.542	65	53	29	14	13	2	84	78
Penn State	18	7	11	0	2	1	0	20	.389	48	68	22	10	12	0	65	81
Ohio State	22	6	16	0	0	2	0	20	.273	39	82	27	7	19	1	53	101
Michigan State	22	5	16	1	2	0	0	15	.250	32	70	27	7	18	2	40	77
Championship: March 16, 2021 † indicates conference regular season champion * indicates conference tournament champion Rankings: USCHO.com Top 20 Poll

== Schedule and results ==
Date	Time	Opponent^{#}	Rank^{#}	Site	TV	Decision	Result	Attendance	Record
Regular season
November 13	6:06 PM	at #20 Notre Dame		Compton Family Ice Arena • Notre Dame, Indiana	NBCSN	Beydoun	W 2–0	0	1–0–0 (1–0–0)
November 14	6:06 PM	at #20 Notre Dame		Compton Family Ice Arena • Notre Dame, Indiana	NHL Network	Beydoun	W 5–3	0	2–0–0 (2–0–0)
November 19	6:02 PM	vs. #6 Michigan	#14	LaBahn Arena • Madison, Wisconsin	FSD, FSW	Beydoun	L 2–5	0	2–1–0 (2–1–0)
November 20	6:02 PM	vs. #6 Michigan	#14	LaBahn Arena • Madison, Wisconsin	FSD+, FSW	Beydoun	L 1–2 ^{OT}	0	2–2–0 (2–2–0)
November 23	5:08 PM	vs. #15 Penn State	#14	LaBahn Arena • Madison, Wisconsin	BTN	Beydoun	W 6–3	0	3–2–0 (3–2–0)
November 24	5:08 PM	vs. #15 Penn State	#14	LaBahn Arena • Madison, Wisconsin	BTN	Beydoun	W 7–3	0	4–2–0 (4–2–0)
November 28	7:04 PM	vs. Arizona State*	#14	LaBahn Arena • Madison, Wisconsin	FSW	Rowe	L 5–8	0	4–3–0
November 29	4:04 PM	vs. Arizona State*	#14	LaBahn Arena • Madison, Wisconsin	FSW	Beydoun	L 1–3	0	4–4–0
December 3	4:30 PM	at #13 Ohio State	#14	Value City Arena • Columbus, Ohio		Beydoun	L 2–4	0	4–5–0 (4–3–0)
December 4	4:32 PM	at #13 Ohio State	#14	Value City Arena • Columbus, Ohio	ESPNU	Rowe	W 3–1	0	5–5–0 (5–3–0)
January 9	4:04 PM	vs. #1 Minnesota	#12	LaBahn Arena • Madison, Wisconsin		Beydoun	W 3–1	0	6–5–0 (6–3–0)
January 10	4:04 PM	vs. #1 Minnesota	#12	LaBahn Arena • Madison, Wisconsin		Beydoun	L 3–5	0	6–6–0 (6–4–0)
January 16	7:04 PM	vs. Arizona State	#12	LaBahn Arena • Madison, Wisconsin	FSW	Rowe	W 4–0	0	7–6–0
January 17	6:34 PM	vs. Arizona State	#12	LaBahn Arena • Madison, Wisconsin	FSW	Rowe	W 5–2	0	8–6–0
January 21	5:04 PM	at Penn State	#12	Pegula Ice Arena • University Park, Pennsylvania		Rowe	W 4–1	171	9–6–0 (7–4–0)
January 22	5:04 PM	at Penn State	#12	Pegula Ice Arena • University Park, Pennsylvania		Beydoun	L 4–5	180	9–7–0 (7–5–0)
January 29	7:04 PM	vs. Michigan State	#13	LaBahn Arena • Madison, Wisconsin		Beydoun	W 6–0	0	10–7–0 (8–5–0)
January 30	3:04 PM	vs. Michigan State	#13	LaBahn Arena • Madison, Wisconsin		Rowe	W 4–1	0	11–7–0 (9–5–0)
February 5	7:05 PM	at #2 Minnesota	#11	3M Arena at Mariucci • Minneapolis, Minnesota		Beydoun	W 4–1	0	12–7–0 (10–5–0)
February 6	7:05 PM	at #2 Minnesota	#11	3M Arena at Mariucci • Minneapolis, Minnesota		Rowe	W 8–1	0	13–7–0 (11–5–0)
February 13	1:04 PM	at #8 Michigan	#7	Yost Ice Arena • Ann Arbor, Michigan		Beydoun	L 1–5	93	13–8–0 (11–6–0)
February 14	4:04 PM	at #8 Michigan	#7	Yost Ice Arena • Ann Arbor, Michigan		Rowe	W 3–2	98	14–8–0 (12–6–0)
February 19	7:04 PM	vs. Notre Dame	#5	LaBahn Arena • Madison, Wisconsin		Beydoun	W 4–2	0	15–8–0 (13–6–0)
February 20	4:04 PM	vs. Notre Dame	#5	LaBahn Arena • Madison, Wisconsin		Rowe	T 5–5 ^{SOL}	0	15–8–1 (13–6–1)
February 26	7:04 PM	vs. Ohio State	#5	LaBahn Arena • Madison, Wisconsin		Beydoun	W 2–1 ^{OT}	0	16–8–1 (14–6–1)
February 27	4:04 PM	vs. Ohio State	#5	LaBahn Arena • Madison, Wisconsin		Rowe	W 7–0	0	17–8–1 (15–6–1)
March 5	3:00 PM	at Michigan State	#5	Munn Ice Arena • East Lansing, Michigan		Beydoun	W 4–0	0	18–8–1 (16–6–1)
March 6	1:30 PM	at Michigan State	#5	Munn Ice Arena • East Lansing, Michigan	BTN	Rowe	W 2–1	0	19–8–1 (17–6–1)
Big Ten Tournament
March 15	3:35 PM	vs. Penn State*	#5	Compton Family Ice Arena • Notre Dame, Indiana (Big Ten Semifinal)		Beydoun	W 4–3 ^{OT}	158	20–8–1
March 16	7:05 PM	vs. #4 Minnesota*	#5	Compton Family Ice Arena • Notre Dame, Indiana (Big Ten Championship)		Rowe	L 4–6	149	20–9–1
NCAA Tournament
March 26	12:00 PM	vs. Bemidji State*	#4	Webster Bank Arena • Bridgeport, Connecticut (NCAA East Regional semifinal)	ESPN2	Beydoun	L 3–6	0	20–10–1
*Non-conference game. ^{#}Rankings from USCHO.com Poll. All times are in Central Time.

== Scoring statistics ==
Name	Position	Games	Goals	Assists	Points	PIM
Cole Caufield	RW	31	30	22	52	4
Linus Weissbach	LW/RW	31	12	29	41	12
Dylan Holloway	C/LW	23	11	24	35	19
Ty Pelton-Byce	F	24	12	19	31	2
Roman Ahcan	LW	26	9	13	22	43
Brock Caufield	RW	31	7	10	17	0
Owen Lindmark	C	27	4	13	17	4
Jack Gorniak	C/LW	31	6	7	13	8
Ty Emberson	D	31	4	9	13	6
Tarek Baker	LW	27	3	9	12	24
Tyler Inamoto	D	26	1	8	9	15
Mathieu De St. Phalle	F	31	2	6	8	4
Sam Stange	RW	29	6	1	7	4
Dominick Mersch	F	27	3	4	7	14
Josh Ess	D	31	2	5	7	6
Jesper Peltonen	D	30	0	7	7	2
Anthony Kehrer	D	31	0	7	7	12
Mike Vorlicky	D	24	2	2	4	16
Ryder Donovan	C/RW	22	2	1	3	40
Jason Dhooghe	F	24	2	1	3	2
Shay Donovan	D	10	0	0	0	4
Luke LaMaster	D	14	0	0	0	2
Cameron Rowe	G	16	0	0	0	0
Robbie Beydoun	G	21	0	0	0	0
Bench	-	-	-	-	-	6
Total			118	197	315	249

== Goaltending statistics ==
Name	Games	Minutes	Wins	Losses	Ties	Goals against	Saves	Shut outs	SV %	GAA
Cameron Rowe	16	759	9	2	1	26	362	2	.933	2.05
Robbie Beydoun	21	1103	11	8	0	49	553	3	.919	2.66
Empty Net	-	14	-	-	-	5	-	-	-	-
Total	31	1877	20	10	1	80	915	5	.920	2.56

== Rankings ==
Poll	Week																					
Poll	Pre	1	2	3	4	5	6	7	8	9	10	11	12	13	14	15	16	17	18	19	20	21 (Final)
USCHO.com	NR	14	14	14	12	14	13	14	12	12	12	13	11	7	5	5	5	5	5	4	-	8
USA Today	NR	13	15	NR	13	14	15	15	14	14	12	13	12	6	5	5	5	4	5	4	8	8

USCHO did not release a poll in week 20.

== Awards and honors ==
Player	Award	Ref
Cole Caufield	Hobey Baker Award	
Cole Caufield	NCAA Scoring Champion	
Cole Caufield	AHCA West First Team All-American	
Dylan Holloway	AHCA West Second Team All-American	
Linus Weissbach	AHCA West Second Team All-American	
Cole Caufield	Big Ten Player of the Year	
Cole Caufield	Big Ten Scoring Champion	
Tony Granato	Big Ten Coach of the Year	
Cole Caufield	Big Ten First Team	
Dylan Holloway	Big Ten First Team	
Linus Weissbach	Big Ten Second Team	
Cameron Rowe	Big Ten Freshman Team	
Ty Emberson	Big Ten All-Tournament Team	
Cole Caufield	Big Ten All-Tournament Team	

== 2021 NHL entry draft ==
Round	Pick	Player	NHL team
1	25	Corson Ceulemans^{†}	Columbus Blue Jackets
7	215	Daniel Laatsch^{†}	Pittsburgh Penguins

† incoming freshman
