= Jack LaFontaine =

Canadian ice hockey player (born 1998)

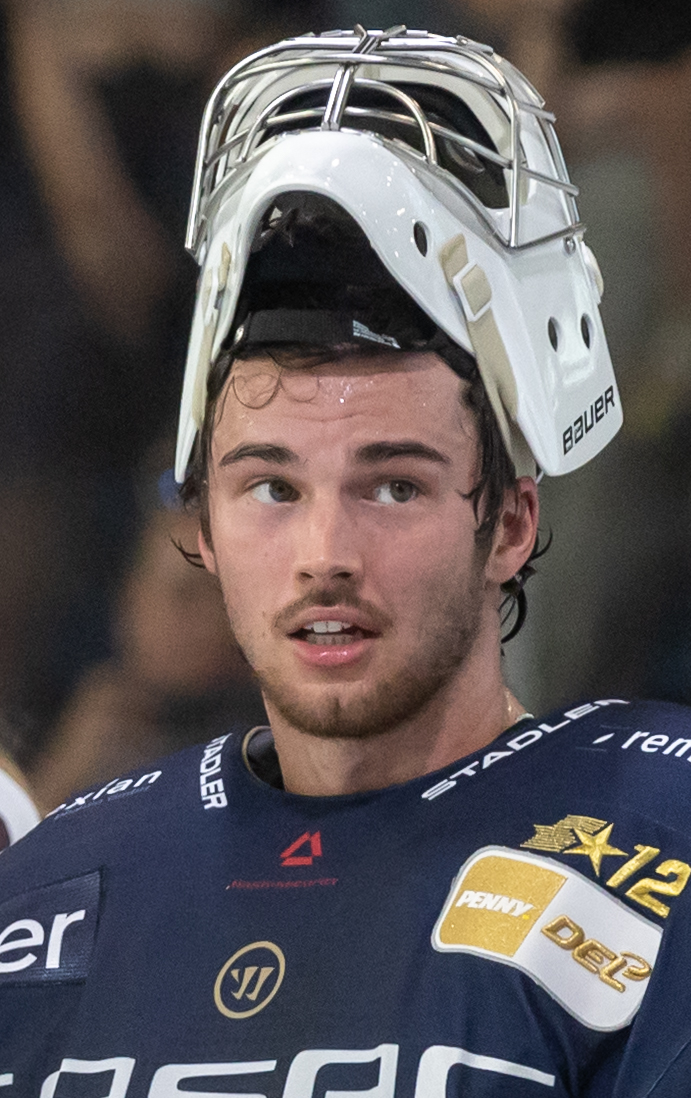
- LaFontaine with Eisbären Berlin in August 2026
- Born: January 6, 1998 (age 28) Mississauga, Ontario, Canada
- Height: 6 ft 3 in (191 cm)
- Weight: 210 lb (95 kg; 15 st 0 lb)
- Position: Goaltender
- Catches: Left
- DEL team Former teams: Eisbären Berlin; Carolina Hurricanes
- NHL draft: 75th overall, 2016; Carolina Hurricanes
- Playing career: 2022–present

Jack LaFontaine (born January 6, 1998) is a Canadian professional ice hockey goaltender for Eisbären Berlin of the Deutsche Eishockey Liga (DEL). He was drafted 75th overall by the Carolina Hurricanes in the 2016 NHL entry draft.

== Playing career ==
=== Junior ===
After spending two seasons at Michigan, primarily serving as a backup goaltender, LaFontaine signed with the Penticton Vees of the British Columbia Hockey League (BCHL) on June 18, 2018. During the 2018–19 season, he posted a 30–13–1 record with a 2.19 goals-against average (GAA) and .923 save percentage. Following an outstanding season, he was named BCHL's Top Goaltender.

=== College ===
LaFontaine began his collegiate career for the University of Michigan during the 2016–17 season. During his freshman season, he appeared in 11 games, where he posted a 1–7–1 record, with a 3.34 GAA and .911 save percentage. During his sophomore season, he appeared in 11 games, where he posted a 4–4 record, with a 3.51 GAA and .889 save percentage.

On August 20, 2019, LaFontaine enrolled at the University of Minnesota. During his junior season, he posted a 9–9–6 record, with a 2.55 GAA and .919 save percentage, in a COVID-19 shortened season. He made his debut for the Gophers on October 11, 2019, in a game against Colorado College.

During his senior season, LaFontaine was the national leader in wins (21–6–0) and save percentage (.936) while ranking second in goals against average (1.74), among goalies that have started at least half their team's games. He was tied for second nationally in shutouts with five. He entered the NCAA tournament having allowed two goals or fewer in 26 of his last 21 starts dating back to the end of the 2019–20 season. LaFontaine set two program records for single-season save percentage (.934) and single-season goals against average (1.79). Following an outstanding season, he was named to the All-Big Ten First Team, Big Ten Goaltender of the Year, and awarded the Mike Richter Award. On April 2, 2021, LaFontaine announced he would return to Minnesota for a fifth year during the 2021–22 season.

=== Professional ===
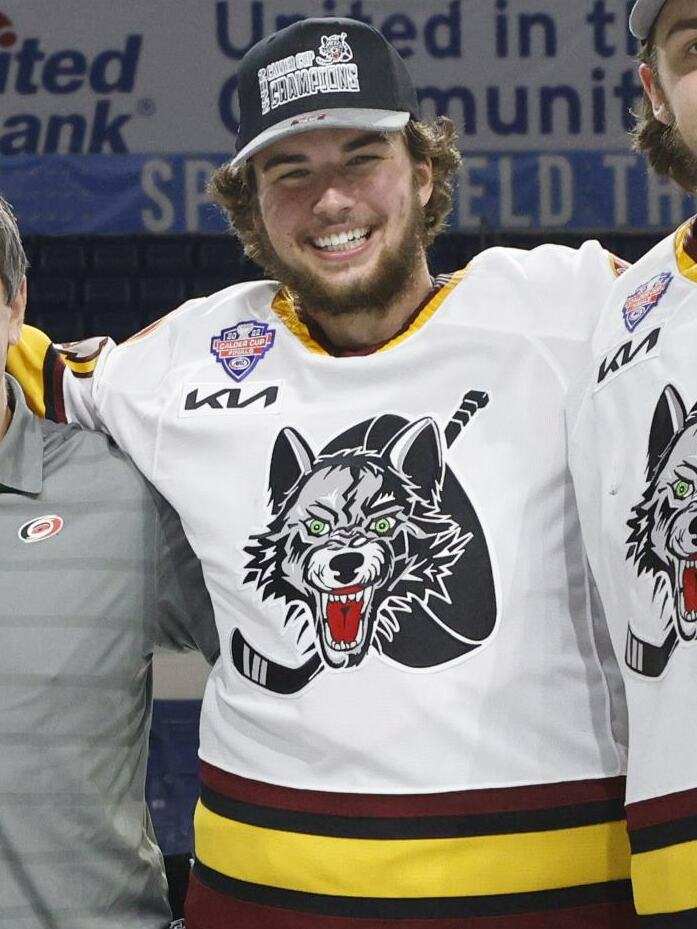
LaFontaine with the Chicago Wolves in 2022

On January 9, 2022, LaFontaine signed a one-year, entry-level contract with the Carolina Hurricanes. After appearing in two games with the Hurricanes, LaFontaine would split the rest of the season between the AHL and ECHL.

As an impending restricted free agent following the conclusion of his entry-level contract, LaFontaine was released as a free agent after he was not tendered a qualifying offer by the Hurricanes. On July 25, 2022, LaFontaine was signed to a one-year AHL contract with the Syracuse Crunch, the primary affiliate to the Tampa Bay Lightning. During the 2022–23 season, LaFontaine was suspended six games after leaving the players’ bench during an altercation and attempting to fight Rochester Americans goaltender Malcolm Subban at the conclusion of the third period.

As a free agent at the conclusion of his contract with the Crunch, LaFontaine continued his career in the AHL by agreeing to a one-year contract with the Coachella Valley Firebirds on August 23, 2023.

LaFontaine continued his tenure within the Firebirds organization, agreeing to a one-year contract extension for the 2025–26 season on July 22, 2025.

Having played three seasons within the Seattle Kraken's minor league affiliates, LaFontaine left North America as a free agent and was signed to a one-year contract with reigning German championship club, Eisbären Berlin of the DEL, on July 7, 2026.

== Career statistics ==
			Regular season									Playoffs
Season	Team	League	GP	W	L	OT	MIN	GA	SO	GAA	SV%	GP	W	L	MIN	GA	SO	GAA	SV%
2014–15	Georgetown Raiders	OJHL	30	20	6	0	1,635	58	2	2.13	.923	—	—	—	—	—	—	—	—
2015–16	Janesville Jets	NAHL	41	24	8	7	2,356	85	4	2.16	.921	—	—	—	—	—	—	—	—
2016–17	University of Michigan	B1G	11	1	7	1	594	33	0	3.34	.911	—	—	—	—	—	—	—	—
2017–18	University of Michigan	B1G	11	4	4	0	530	31	0	3.51	.889	—	—	—	—	—	—	—	—
2018–19	Penticton Vees	BCHL	45	30	13	1	2,686	98	3	2.19	.923	—	—	—	—	—	—	—	—
2019–20	University of Minnesota	B1G	25	9	9	6	1,390	59	0	2.55	.919	—	—	—	—	—	—	—	—
2020–21	University of Minnesota	B1G	29	22	7	0	1,706	51	5	1.79	.934	—	—	—	—	—	—	—	—
2021–22	University of Minnesota	B1G	20	12	8	0	1,162	52	1	2.69	.900	—	—	—	—	—	—	—	—
2021–22	Carolina Hurricanes	NHL	2	0	1	0	75	9	0	7.20	.780	—	—	—	—	—	—	—	—
2021–22	Chicago Wolves	AHL	13	4	3	4	706	34	1	2.89	.885	—	—	—	—	—	—	—	—
2021–22	Norfolk Admirals	ECHL	2	1	0	1	120	7	0	3.49	.922	—	—	—	—	—	—	—	—
2022–23	Syracuse Crunch	AHL	5	1	2	0	178	7	0	2.36	.924	—	—	—	—	—	—	—	—
2022–23	Orlando Solar Bears	ECHL	30	11	14	1	1683	98	1	3.49	.898	—	—	—	—	—	—	—	—
2023–24	Kansas City Mavericks	ECHL	23	16	3	3	1367	63	1	2.77	.911	12	7	4	702	26	0	2.22	.938
2023–24	Coachella Valley Firebirds	AHL	3	2	0	0	131	5	0	2.30	.919	—	—	—	—	—	—	—	—
2024–25	Kansas City Mavericks	ECHL	31	21	8	1	1841	68	5	2.22	.914	15	9	6	904	29	4	1.93	.935
2024–25	Coachella Valley Firebirds	AHL	2	1	0	1	126	5	0	2.38	.917	—	—	—	—	—	—	—	—
2025–26	Kansas City Mavericks	ECHL	29	22	2	4	1704	56	4	1.97	.928	11	7	4	697	28	1	2.41	.906
2025–26	Coachella Valley Firebirds	AHL	5	4	0	0	261	8	1	1.84	.933	—	—	—	—	—	—	—	—
NHL totals			2	0	1	0	75	9	0	7.20	.780	—	—	—	—	—	—	—	—

== Awards and honors ==
Award	Year	Ref
College
Big Ten Goaltender of the Year	2021	
All-Big Ten First Team	2021	
Big Ten All-Tournament Team	2021	
Big Ten Tournament MVP	2021	
Mike Richter Award	2021	
AHCA West First Team All-American	2021	

Awards and achievements
Preceded by Strauss Mann	Big Ten Goaltender of the Year; 2020–21	Succeeded by Jakub Dobeš
Preceded by Jeremy Swayman	Mike Richter Award; 2020–21	Succeeded by Devon Levi
Preceded by Cale Morris	Big Ten Tournament Most Outstanding Player; 2021	Succeeded by Erik Portillo
