= Sampo Ranta =

Finnish ice hockey player

- Born: 31 May 2000 (age 26) Naantali, Finland
- Height: 6 ft 2 in (188 cm)
- Weight: 195 lb (88 kg; 13 st 13 lb)
- Position: Left wing
- Shoots: Left
- SHL team Former teams: Örebro HK; Colorado Avalanche; MoDo Hockey
- NHL draft: 78th overall, 2018; Colorado Avalanche
- Playing career: 2021–present

Sampo Ranta (born 31 May 2000) is a Finnish professional ice hockey forward who is currently under contract with Örebro HK of the Swedish Hockey League (SHL). He played college ice hockey at Minnesota.

== Playing career ==
=== Collegiate ===
Ranta began his collegiate career for the Minnesota Golden Gophers during the 2018–19 season. During his junior year in the 2020–21 season, Ranta recorded 19 goals and 12 assists in 31 games for the Gophers. Following an outstanding season, he was named to the All-Big Ten First Team and named an AHCA First Team All-American. He finished his career at Minnesota with 37 goals and 30 assists in 102 games.

=== Professional ===
On 3 April 2021, Ranta signed a three-year, entry-level contract with the Colorado Avalanche. He made his professional debut for the Colorado Eagles on 10 April 2021. He recorded his first professional goal in his second game on 14 April 2021. He recorded four goals and three assists in 14 AHL games. He was called up by the Avalanche during the 2021 Stanley Cup playoffs. He made his NHL debut during Game 1 of Colorado's second-round series against the Vegas Golden Knights.

Following the conclusion of his entry-level contract with the Avalanche, Ranta, as an impending restricted free agent, opted to halt his North American career by agreeing to a two-year contract with newly promoted Swedish club, MoDo Hockey of the SHL, on 25 May 2023.

With MoDo relegated to the Allsvenskan and having reached the conclusion of his contract, Ranta opted to remain in the SHL, signing a two-year contract with Örebro HK on 9 April 2025.

== International play ==
Medal record

Representing Finland

Ice hockey

World U18 Championships
Gold medal – first place	2018 Russia	

Ranta represented Finland at the 2018 IIHF World U18 Championships, where he recorded one goal and one assist in seven games and won a gold medal. He represented Finland at the 2020 World Junior Ice Hockey Championships.

== Career statistics ==
=== Regular season and playoffs ===
			Regular season					Playoffs
Season	Team	League	GP	G	A	Pts	PIM	GP	G	A	Pts	PIM
2016–17	Sioux City Musketeers	USHL	30	6	3	9	4	1	0	0	0	0
2017–18	Sioux City Musketeers	USHL	53	23	14	37	24	—	—	—	—	—
2018–19	University of Minnesota	B1G	36	6	10	16	29	—	—	—	—	—
2019–20	University of Minnesota	B1G	35	12	8	20	10	—	—	—	—	—
2020–21	University of Minnesota	B1G	31	19	12	31	10	—	—	—	—	—
2020–21	Colorado Eagles	AHL	14	4	3	7	0	2	1	1	2	0
2020–21	Colorado Avalanche	NHL	—	—	—	—	—	2	0	0	0	0
2021–22	Colorado Avalanche	NHL	10	0	0	0	2	—	—	—	—	—
2021–22	Colorado Eagles	AHL	38	7	7	14	27	5	0	0	0	4
2022–23	Colorado Eagles	AHL	58	11	11	22	22	5	0	0	0	2
2022–23	Colorado Avalanche	NHL	6	0	0	0	4	—	—	—	—	—
2023–24	MoDo Hockey	SHL	50	17	14	31	10	—	—	—	—	—
2024–25	MoDo Hockey	SHL	48	10	15	25	12	—	—	—	—	—
2025–26	Örebro HK	SHL	16	3	3	6	10	—	—	—	—	—
NHL totals			16	0	0	0	6	2	0	0	0	0
SHL totals			114	30	32	62	32	—	—	—	—	—

=== International ===
Year	Team	Event	Result	GP	G	A	Pts	PIM
2018	Finland	U18	1st place, gold medalist(s)	7	1	1	2	4
2020	Finland	WJC	4th	7	0	2	2	14
Junior totals				14	1	3	4	18

== Awards and honors ==
Award	Year
College
All-Big Ten First Team	2021
AHCA West First Team All-American	2021
