= Michigan Wolverines men's ice hockey =

Men's ice hockey team of the University of Michigan

- Current season
- University: University of Michigan
- Conference: Big Ten
- First season: 1922–23
- Head coach: Brandon Naurato; 4th season, 98–50–10
- Captain(s): Garrett Schifsky
- Alternate captain(s): Asher Barnett; Michael Hage; Nick Moldenhauer; Ben Robertson
- Arena: Yost Ice Arena; Ann Arbor, Michigan
- Student section: Children of Yost
- Colors: Maize and blue
- Fight song: The Victors

NCAA tournament champions
- 1948, 1951, 1952, 1953, 1955, 1956, 1964, 1996, 1998

NCAA tournament runner-up
- 1957, 1977, 2011

NCAA tournament Frozen Four
- 1948, 1949, 1950, 1951, 1952, 1953, 1954, 1955, 1956, 1957, 1962, 1964, 1977, 1992, 1993, 1995, 1996, 1997, 1998, 2001, 2002, 2003, 2008, 2011, 2018, 2022, 2023, 2024, 2026

NCAA tournament appearances
- 1948, 1949, 1950, 1951, 1952, 1953, 1954, 1955, 1956, 1957, 1962, 1964, 1977, 1991, 1992, 1993, 1994, 1995, 1996, 1997, 1998, 1999, 2000, 2001, 2002, 2003, 2004, 2005, 2006, 2007, 2008, 2009, 2010, 2011, 2012, 2016, 2018, 2021, 2022, 2023, 2024, 2026

Conference tournament champions
- CCHA: 1994, 1996, 1997, 1999, 2002, 2003, 2005, 2008, 2010; Big Ten: 1968, 2016, 2022, 2023, 2026

Conference regular season champions
- WCHA: 1953, 1956, 1964; Big Ten: 1925, 1927, 1930, 1931, 1935, 1937, 1938, 1961, 1962, 1964, 1968, 1969; CCHA: 1992, 1994, 1995, 1996, 1997, 2000, 2002, 2004, 2005, 2008, 2011 (Note: Despite their members belonging to other conferences, the Big Ten still awarded regular season conference championships from 1923 to 1943 and 1959 to 1981, and held a conference tournament from 1967 to 1969. In 2013, the Big Ten began officially sponsoring hockey again.)

Current uniform
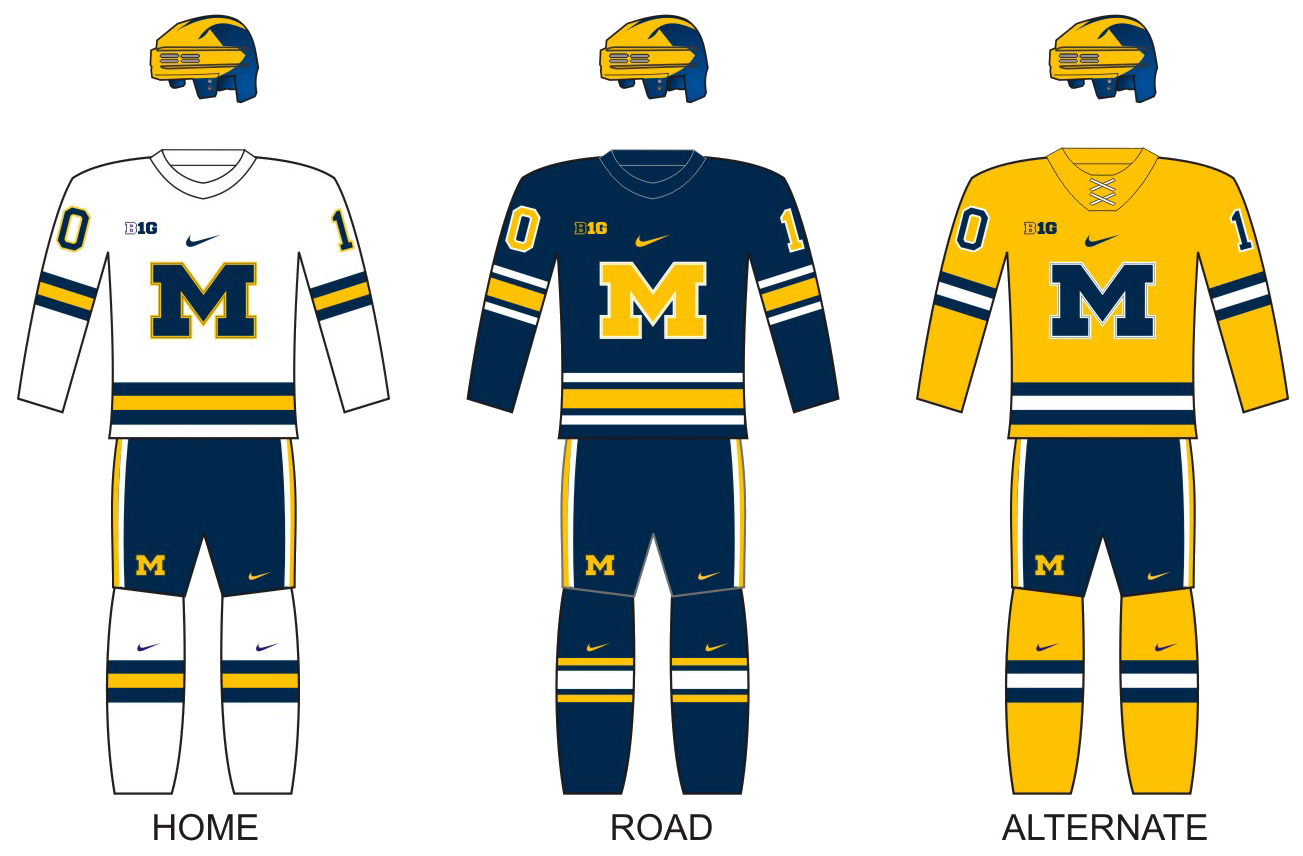

The Michigan Wolverines men's ice hockey team is the college ice hockey team that represents the University of Michigan in Ann Arbor, Michigan. The program earned varsity status in 1922, and has competed for 105 consecutive seasons. The team played as an independent until 1951, before transferring to multiple conferences in the 1950s. From 1959 to 1981, the team competed in the Western Collegiate Hockey Association (WCHA) and then the Central Collegiate Hockey Association (CCHA) from 1981 to 2013. Since the 2013–14 season, the Wolverines have competed in the Big Ten Conference, which at the time began sponsoring hockey.

Michigan has had many successes as a program including a record-setting number of championships, total championship tournament appearances, and consecutive tournament appearances. From 1991 to 2012, the team played in 22 consecutive NCAA Division I Men's Ice Hockey Tournaments, an NCAA record. The Wolverines have won nine Division I NCAA Men's Ice Hockey Championships, seven of which came during a 17-year stretch between 1948 and 1964. Two more championships were won under head coach Red Berenson in 1996 and 1998. The Wolverines have won the second-most all-time NCAA National Hockey Championships with nine (1948, 1951, 1952, 1953, 1955, 1956, 1964, 1996, 1998), behind the Denver Pioneers record eleven championships.

Players from the program have earned numerous honors, professional championships, international championships, individual statistical championships, team and individual records. The previous head coach was Mel Pearson, a former assistant to coach Red Berenson, who retired in 2017 after leading the program for 33 years. Berenson for nearly 50 years has continued to hold the school single-season goal scoring record, and was the second player in the program's history to win the Stanley Cup. The program has dozens of National Hockey League alumni and 21 current 2026–27 NHL season opening-day players, which led all collegiate programs. They currently hold the record for the most titles at the Great Lakes Invitational with 17 titles respectively. Their traditional rival is Michigan State and the teams have played an annual game in Detroit since 1990, first at Joe Louis Arena but currently at Little Caesars Arena since 2018.

In 2010, Michigan hosted a Guinness-verified world record crowd in excess of 113,000 in an event known as The Big Chill which was held at Michigan Stadium.

== Team history and seasons ==
=== Early history ===
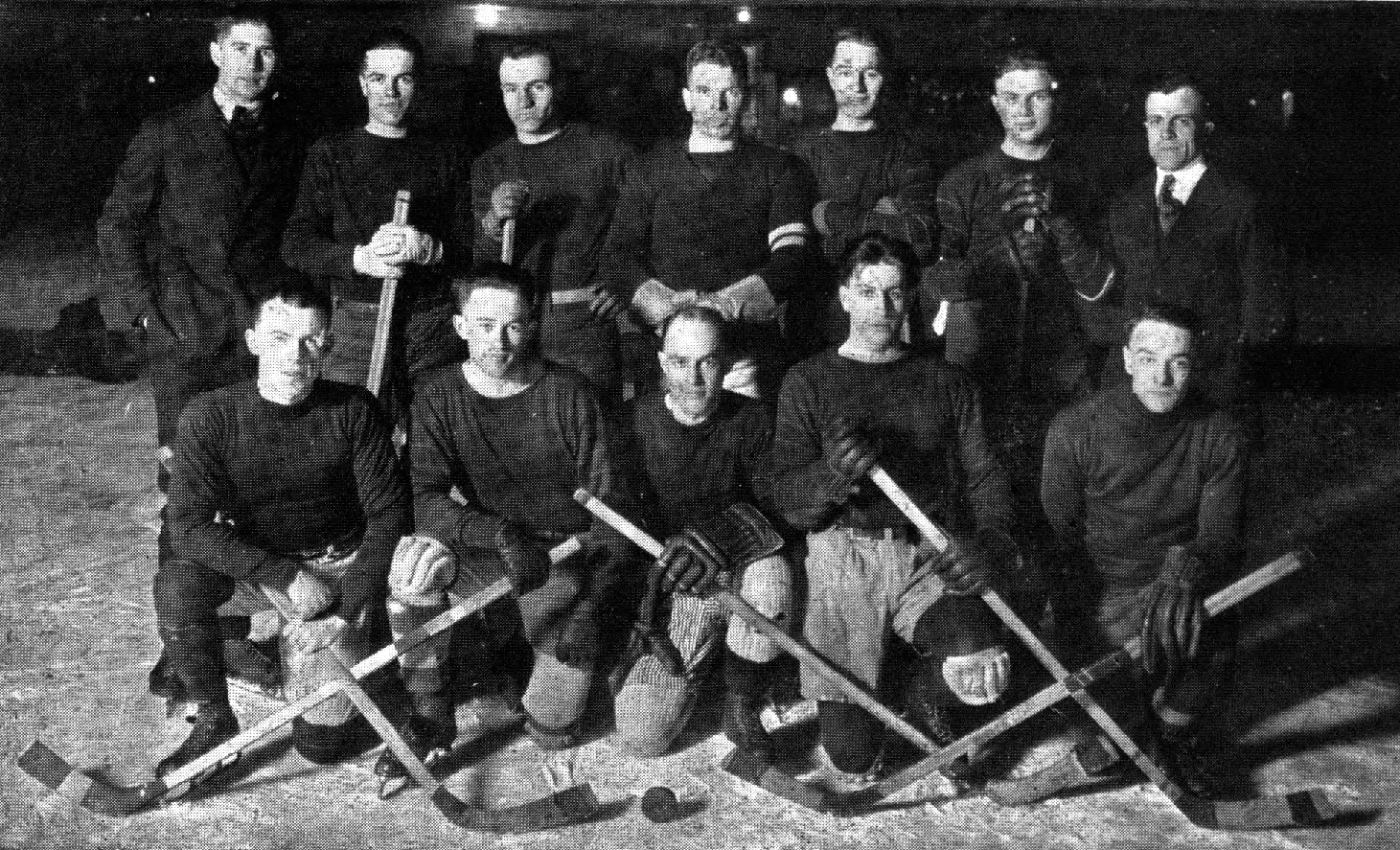
1920 "Informal Varsity Hockey Team"

In 1920, "as a result of the interest in the interclass and interfraternity leagues, in which twenty-two teams took part", an informal Michigan hockey team was organized to represent the university. Mr. Le Mieux of the Engineering faculty had played 12 years of professional hockey and offered his services as coach. Because of the difficulty in securing intercollegiate competition, the 1920 team played a six-game schedule against an Ann Arbor team, Assumption College, and four games against teams from the Detroit Hockey League. The 1920 Michigan team, with Russell Barkell as the team's high scorer, compiled a 6–0 record and outscored opponents 27 to 7. In February 1920, The Michigan Alumnus noted: "There is a big sentiment for a Varsity hockey team. The difficulties are the lack of a University rink, and the arranging of suitable competition." In April 1920, The Michigan Chimes wrote:

"The record of our informal hockey team which was organized at the close of the January interclass sports, has been truly remarkable. With only two weeks of practice, it has defeated the three strongest Detroit teams. ... Unfortunately this one team of ours which seems able to win, and shows possibilities of great development has not as yet been recognized as a regular team."

Later, The Michigan Chimes published a lengthy article pleading for the administration to recognize hockey as a varsity sport: "Agitation was started for the recognition of hockey as a varsity sport. What spell, what charm there is in that single appellation bestowed by custom on football, baseball, track, and recently basketball! What obstacles must be overcome, what sacrifices made, to attain the heights!"

With the success of the informal Michigan hockey team in 1920, Michigan moved forward with the development of the hockey team. According to Wilfred Byron Shaw's four-volume history of the University of Michigan, "Hockey also had its beginning in 1921, with Joseph Barss as Coach (1921–26). Although officially not on the Western Conference athletic program, hockey provided a number of Big Ten teams with competition." The 1921 season saw the development of intercollegiate hockey at Michigan, Wisconsin and Minnesota. In January 1921, Michigan and Wisconsin scheduled four games to be played on consecutive weekends from February 18 to 26, 1921. The 1921 team began the season with two games against the Michigan College of Mines at Houghton, Michigan. Michigan lost the first game 3–0 but won the second game 4–3. Russell Barkell, the first standout hockey player at Michigan, was the Michigan star in both games against the College of Mines. However, the remainder of the season, including the planned four-game series with Wisconsin, was cancelled due to warm weather. The Michigan Alumnus reported in March 1921: "The warmth of the present winter has made necessary the cancelling of all scheduled hockey games. The informal team had started off well, but lack of ice made the development of a really powerful team impossible."

In December 1921, The Michigan Alumnus wrote: "There will be much pushing of the puck this year. The Athletic Association hopes to have more money to spend for Michigan skaters, and plans to encourage hockey more than ever before. We used to spend our time 'doing the grapevine,' but only because we were not fast enough for shinny. More power to the shinny artists."

Over the course of a 10-game schedule, Michigan's 1922 squad finished with a record of 5–5. The team opened the 1922 season with a 5–1 victory over Michigan Agricultural College (now known as Michigan State University) in the first hockey match between the rival schools. They followed with a 3–2 overtime victory over the Detroit Rayls on January 16, 1922. Later that month, the Notre Dame hockey team defeated Michigan 3–2 in overtime, marking the first defeat for the Michigan hockey team on its home rink in three years. The team traveled to Houghton for night games against the Michigan School of Mines, losing both games by scores of 2–1 and 5–2. The Wolverines beat the School of Mines 4–1 in a rematch in Ann Arbor. In the season's seventh game, Michigan defeated Wisconsin 6–3 in the first match between Western Conference hockey teams. Following another loss to Notre Dame (7–2), Michigan defeated Wisconsin for the second time by a score of 5–1; Barkell scored three goals against Wisconsin and was the high scorer in the game. The season ended with a 5–2 victory over the Windsor Monarchs.

In March 1922, The Michigan Alumnus reported that athletic director Fielding H. Yost had stated that recognition of hockey as a minor sport was very probable in 1923. Yost expressed the view that the sport should be either intramural or intercollegiate and not an informal sport. The same article noted that Michigan's hockey team had already met Notre Dame, Michigan School of Mines, Michigan Agricultural College and many Detroit teams.

According to Bacon's history of the Michigan hockey program, the first "official" college hockey game played west of the Alleghenies was a game between Michigan and Wisconsin, played on January 12, 1923, in Ann Arbor, Michigan. The game went into overtime with Michigan prevailing by a score of 2–1. The Capital Times in Madison reported on the game as follows: "Michigan counted the first point, when Kahn, by clever work, rushed the ball through the Badger defense for a goal. In the second period Blodgett for Wisconsin tied the score. The first five-minute period of overtime found both teams battling desperately. The second five minutes was a repetition. The Wolverines seemed held on from the side, slipped the puck through the goal for the winning point." In another account, the Madison newspaper wrote that, "after outplaying Michigan all the way through, Wisconsin lost in the second overtime period when a lucky shot went for a goal." Michigan again defeated Wisconsin 1–0 in the second game of the season, played the following day, January 13, 1923.

Barss coached the Michigan Wolverines men's ice hockey team from 1922 to 1927. In five years as the head coach, the Michigan hockey team compiled a record of 26–21–4.

As the popularity of college hockey grew in the early 1920s, other colleges looked to Barss' pupils for coaching candidates. In January 1923, former Michigan hockey star Russell Barkell was hired as the coach of the hockey team at Williams College.

In February 1924, after a 3–0 victory by Michigan over Wisconsin, a Madison newspaper praised the defensive play of the Barss-coached Wolverines: "With an almost air-tight defense and a definite scoring attack the Michigan hockey team defeated the Badger six by a score of 3–0 yesterday afternoon. Wisconsin could not stop Michigan's fast team work and was unable to penetrate their defense to take any close shots at the goal."

In mid-1925, the university purchased the former Weinberg Coliseum, a local ice skating rink that had served as the unofficial home of the Wolverines hockey team since 1920. The facility, which had previously relied on winter weather to maintain its ice, was renovated to add artificial coolant to guarantee its playing surface year-round. The Michigan Coliseum would remain home to the Wolverines until the opening of Yost Ice Arena in 1973.

=== Vic Heyliger era ===
From 1947–48 through 1956–57, when Vic Heyliger retired, the Michigan hockey team had won 195 games, lost only 41, and tied 11. The Wolverines' record got them 10 consecutive invitations to the Frozen Four, where they came home with the national title six times-records that have never been in danger of being broken by any college team a half century later. This also helped shift the locus of power in hockey from the East to the West when it was previously thought to be the other way around. Led by Michigan, the West won 18 of the first 20 NCAA championships, setting the question rather emphatically. The run also ensured the team its place on campus for years to come, filling a hole created by the football and basketball teams' mediocrity during the fifties.

Of Michigan's 53 players who have earned All-American status, almost half (24) played for Heyliger between 1948 and 1957. During that stretch he never had fewer than two players on the All-American team. Four times he had five players so honored, and in 1956 he had a record six players on the squad. In Michigan history, twelve Wolverines have won it twice or more. Heyliger coached nine of them and recruited the tenth, Bob White. No other school has ever amassed and developed such a mother lode of talent in the history of college hockey.

For all of this Heyliger was given the NCAA's Spencer Penrose Award for Coach of the Year, he was inducted into the U.S. Hockey Hall of Fame, and he was selected in 1996 by the American Hockey Coaches Association as one of the five best college coaches of the century, and the very best of the first half. In 1980 he became the first hockey coach to be inducted into the University of Michigan's Hall of Honor. Heyliger's severe asthma forced him to leave the team and Ann Arbor in the summer of 1957. His impact on the Michigan program, the NCAA tournament, the WCHA, and college hockey would be hard to overstate.

=== Al Renfrew era ===
Through Heyliger's tenure, athletic director Fritz Crisler had seen the virtue of having a Michigan man head the hockey program. When it came time for Crisler to conduct his second search for a hockey coach, therefore, he sought out Al Renfrew, an affable man who had captained the 1948–49 Wolverine squad and had already been coaching college hockey for six years.

At the end of Renfrew's first season in Grand Forks, Heyliger stepped down from the Michigan job and told Renfrew to put his name in for it. Renfrew wrote Fritz Crisler a letter in March indicating his interest, but Crisler didn't respond for over a month. Renfrew had already concluded he was out of the running when Crisler called to offer him the job. His decision should have been harder than it was. He had built a great team at North Dakota, and the players he recruited won the national title two years after he left, but he was too excited to be back in Ann Arbor.

Renfrew inherited a team that had gone 18–5–2 and finished one victory short of its third consecutive NCAA title in 1956–57—and then Renfrew promptly suffered Michigan's first losing season since World War II. His skaters finished 8–13 in 1957–58, his first year, and 8–13–1 his second. But Renfrew wasn't worried-he knew he had a secret weapon coming in.

From 1958 to 1964, some 14 players made the trek from Regina, Saskatchewan to Ann Arbor, including one Red Berenson. While still in high school, Berenson had already become a highly touted major junior player, one good enough to join the Montreal Canadiens system straight out of high school, but he had other ideas. A serious student, Berenson became aware of the world of American college hockey when Regina Pats high-profile coach Murray Armstrong went south of the border in 1956 to accept the head coaching job at University of Denver. Berenson visited North Dakota in 1958 and was favorably impressed at the caliber of players the former coach, a man named Al Renfrew, had lured to Grand Forks before Ranfrew returned to Michigan the year before. But soon after Berenson's visit to North Dakota, Dale MacDonald, a Saskatchewan native playing for Renfrew at Michigan, told his coach that Berenson was the rare player worth going out of his way to get. Renfrew scraped together enough money to fly the young phenom to Michigan, thereby making him the first hockey player ever to receive a free recruiting trip to Ann Arbor. The extra effort was worth it, for both parties. Once he was on campus, they didn't have to sell him on it. "After I came down on a visit", Berenson confirms, "I came back and told the other guys. "This is where we're going." And just like that, a pipeline of hockey talent was created between Regina and Ann Arbor.

Berenson's decision, at least, came with a price. Frank Selke, the Montreal GM who had drafted Berenson, warned him that if he went to an America college he would never become a pro. Fully aware he might be sacrificing the dream of every Canadian boy to play in the NHL-and for the Montreal Canadiens, no less—Berenson didn't flinch. After sitting out his first year, which the NCAA required of all freshmen at that time, Berenson suited up for his first game on February 5, 1960, against Minnesota. He scored 90 seconds into his first game, assisted on another goal five minutes later and scored a third later in the game. Everyone in the building that night had just seen the future of Michigan hockey, and it looked bright.

Renfrew notched his first winning season and his first league playoff berth in the 1960–61 season. The following season, the Berenson-captained squad didn't lose a game through New Year's, and finished the regular season with a 20–3 mark. As expected, the Wolverines received their first NCAA bid under Renfrew that spring. Michigan was a slight favorite entering the 1962 NCAA Tournament in Utica, New York, but were upset by Clarkson 5–4 in the semifinal. In a life with few regrets, the game against Clarkson ranks near the top for Berenson. "We should've won it", he said. "We were destined to meet Michigan Tech in the finals, but got knocked off by and underdog-Clarkson-back when eastern teams weren't that good. You don't get too many chances to win it all as a player. At the time it doesn't seem so important, but 10 years, 20 years later, you ask yourself: "Why the hell didn't we do that?" After scoring his school record-tying 43rd goal against St. Lawrence in the consolation game, Berenson caught a ride to Boston, where he played for the Canadiens the next night, making him the first player to jump directly from college to the NHL.

The 1964 squad returned its two leading scorers from the previous season, Gary Butler and Gordon Wilkie, both ex-Pats, who had combined for 79 points in just 24 games the previous season. They played better than expected, combining for a remarkable 135 points in just 29 games-both players finished just shy of Berenson's single-season record of 70 points. Rookie Wilf Martin added an unexpected 58 points. Mel Wakabayashi, all 5'5" of him, join the team in January 1964, centering Rob Coristine and Bob Ferguson on the third line. The trio added 107 points, which would have made them the top-scoring line the previous season. Added it all up and you had the first Michigan team to score more than 200 goals in a season, averaging a prolific 7.5 goals per game. Thanks largely to the scoring streak, this unheralded but determined bunch beat every opponent at least once en route to a 24–2–1 record, winning more games than any team in Michigan history. At the 1964 Frozen Four, Denver took care of Rensselaer, 4–1, while Michigan survived a close game with Providence, 3–2. For the final game, 7,000 Pioneer fans packed the Denver Arena to watch their team battle for its fourth NCAA title in seven years. The underdog Wolverines beat Denver, 6–3, in the Bulldogs' backyard, winning their seventh national championship. It was the last hurrah for the Regina regiment, a group of some 14 players who came to Ann Arbor between 1958 and 1964. "This is the place", Berenson told them, and they followed.

=== Transition to Yost Arena and the Central Collegiate Hockey Association (CCHA) ===
Renfrew retired as head coach following the 1972–73 season. He was succeeded by Dan Farrell, a former assistant coach at Michigan Tech (where Renfrew had previously coached). Farrell's first season was also the team's first at their new home in the converted Fielding H. Yost Field House, now known as Yost Ice Arena. Farrell guided the Wolverines to the 1977 NCAA championship game at Olympia Stadium, losing to the Wisconsin Badgers by a score of 6–5. Farrell's teams would be unable to duplicate that success, and he stepped down at the end of the 1979–80 season.

Wilf Martin returned to his alma mater to serve as head coach, but only lasted two games into the 1980–81 season before he was forced to step down for health reasons. Assistant coach John Giordano took over for the rest of the season. In 1981, Giordano's Wolverines moved from the WCHA to the CCHA, joining fellow Big Ten rival schools Michigan State (which also jumped from the WCHA) and Ohio State (a founding member of the CCHA), as well as football rival Notre Dame. It was hoped that the change in conferences would help the Wolverines compete, but Michigan followed up a first-round conference tournament loss to the Irish with back-to-back ninth-place finishes. In the spring of 1984 Giordano's team mutinied when all 22 players signed a list of grievances. With the entire team behind the revolt, athletic director Don Canham was left with little choice but to relieve Giordano of his duties.

=== Red Berenson era ===
After a lengthy playing career in the NHL and a stint as head coach of the St. Louis Blues (where he won the Jack Adams Award) and a term as an assistant to Scotty Bowman in Buffalo, Red Berenson returned to his alma mater in 1984 to take over the reins. Berenson's teams faced a stiff rival in Ron Mason's Spartans, who dominated the CCHA in the mid-80s and won the 1986 NCAA championship. Prior to the 1989 CCHA playoffs, Berenson had the Wolverines adopt the winged helmet design associated with the football team.

After several years of rebuilding the Wolverines finally won a CCHA playoff series in 1990 and returned to the NCAA tournament for the first time in 14 years the following season. That appearance was the first of a record 22 consecutive berths, including 11 Frozen Four appearances and three appearances in the title game, winning the championship in 1996 and 1998. Along the way Berenson's teams won 11 CCHA titles, 9 CCHA Tournaments and produced 11 30+ win seasons including a record 8 consecutive from 1991 through 1998. Two of Berenson's players won the Hobey Baker Award, Brendan Morrison (1997) and Kevin Porter while Marty Turco (127) and Steve Shields (111) became the 1st- and 2nd-winningest goaltenders in NCAA history.

The 1996 Frozen Four run is most notable for forward Mike Legg's goal in the regional semi-final against Minnesota at Munn Ice Arena in East Lansing. Legg picked up the puck behind the net with the toe of his stick, cradled it on the blade, and tucked it into the top corner all in one motion. The highlight-reel goal has become one of the most famous in the history of hockey worldwide and has been mimicked by many a player. While it goes by other names (Europeans call it an "airhook", while it has also been called a "Svech", after Carolina Hurricanes forward Andrei Svechnikov who was the first to score such a goal in the NHL), most hockey players and fans call this move a Michigan goal or "The Michigan".

The streak was broken in the final season of the CCHA, when the team failed to get an invite after losing the conference championship to Notre Dame. Berenson's final trip to the NCAA tournament came in 2016, which was also his last conference championship (this time in the Big Ten). Berenson announced his retirement on April 10, 2017.

=== Mel Pearson era ===
On April 24, 2017, Mel Pearson was announced as the new head coach at the University of Michigan. In his first season the team went 22-15-3 overall, 11-10-3 in Big Ten play. They reached the 2018 Big Ten Men's Ice Hockey Tournament but lost to Ohio State (3-2) in overtime. Nevertheless, the team qualified for the NCAA Tournament and went to the Frozen Four before losing to Notre Dame (4-3) on a last-second goal.

During the 2021 NHL entry draft, Michigan became the first school in NCAA Division I history to have three teammates drafted in the first round of the NHL Draft. Owen Power was drafted first overall by the Buffalo Sabres, Matty Beniers was drafted second overall by the Seattle Kraken, and Kent Johnson was drafted fifth overall by the Columbus Blue Jackets. Michigan also became the first program to have teammates drafted first and second overall in the same NHL Draft for the first time since 1969. With Beniers being picked by Seattle, Michigan became the first collegiate team to have a player drafted by all 32 NHL franchises. Incoming freshman recruits Luke Hughes was drafted fourth overall by the New Jersey Devils and Mackie Samoskevich was drafted 24th overall by the Florida Panthers. Michigan became the first program to have five players/recruits selected in the first round of one draft.

On August 5, 2022, it was announced Pearson was relieved of his duties.

=== Brandon Naurato era ===
On August 7, 2022, Michigan promoted Naurato to interim head coach for the 2022–23 Wolverines. On March 31, 2023, he was officially named the permanent head coach, agreeing to a five-year contract. Naurato won the 2023 Big Ten tournament and led the Wolverines to the Frozen Four that season. He followed with a repeat appearance to the Frozen Four in 2024. Naurato won his second Big Ten tournament in 2026, the program's fourth overall title, and gained a 42nd NCAA tournament berth for Michigan, where he led the team to a third Frozen Four under his leadership.

=== Hazing allegations ===
In a lawsuit filed in early September 2026, multiple prior ice hockey team members alleged hazing by sexual abuse between 1984 and 2001, with further allegations that Michigan coaches, including Red Berenson, were aware of the hazing and concealed the nature of the abuse, misled and/or punished players who complained. The former players alleged that they were stripped naked, had objects inserted in their rectums, and other actions leading to long term effects of the hazing resulting including depression and substance abuse. The University denied that it was responsible or liable for the alleged claims and stressed that those who allegedly participated were breaking University policy and highlighted their anti-hazing policy first adopted in 1982.

=== Conferences ===
Conference affiliation since 1951

- Midwest Collegiate Hockey League (1951–53)
- Western Intercollegiate Hockey League (1953–58)
- Big Ten Conference (1958–81)
- Western Collegiate Hockey Association (1959–81)
- Central Collegiate Hockey Association (1981–2013)
- Big Ten Conference (2013–present)

== Championships ==
=== NCAA National championships ===
Year	Champion	Score	Runner-up	City	Arena	Ref.
1948	Michigan	8–4	Dartmouth	Colorado Springs, Colorado	Broadmoor Arena	
1951	Michigan	7–1	Brown	Colorado Springs, Colorado	Broadmoor Arena	
1952	Michigan	4–1	Colorado College	Colorado Springs, Colorado	Broadmoor Arena	
1953	Michigan	7–3	Minnesota	Colorado Springs, Colorado	Broadmoor Arena	
1955	Michigan	5–3	Colorado College	Colorado Springs, Colorado	Broadmoor Arena	
1956	Michigan	7–5	Michigan Tech	Colorado Springs, Colorado	Broadmoor Arena	
1964	Michigan	6–3	Denver	Denver, CO	University of Denver Arena	
1996	Michigan	3–2	Colorado College	Cincinnati, OH	Riverfront Coliseum	
1998	Michigan	3–2	Boston College	Boston, MA	Fleet Center	

=== Conference Regular-Season Championships ===
Season	Conference	Record	Head coach
1952–53	MCHL	12–4–0	Vic Heyliger
1955–56	WIHL	15–2–1	Vic Heyliger
1963–64	WCHA	12–2–0	Al Renfrew
1991–92	CCHA	22–7–3	Red Berenson
1993–94	CCHA	24–5–1	Red Berenson
1994–95	CCHA	22–4–1	Red Berenson
1995–96	CCHA	22–6–2	Red Berenson
1996–97	CCHA	21–3–3	Red Berenson
1999–00	CCHA	19–6–3	Red Berenson
2001–02	CCHA	19–5–4	Red Berenson
2003–04	CCHA	18–8–2	Red Berenson
2004–05	CCHA	23–3–2	Red Berenson
2007–08	CCHA	20–4–4	Red Berenson
2010–11	CCHA	20–7–1	Red Berenson

=== Conference Tournament championships ===
Tournament	Conference	Championship Game Opponent	Score	Location	Head coach
1994	CCHA	Lake Superior State	3–0	Joe Louis Arena Detroit, Michigan	Red Berenson
1996	CCHA	Lake Superior State	4–3	Joe Louis Arena Detroit, Michigan	Red Berenson
1997	CCHA	Michigan State	3–1	Joe Louis Arena Detroit, Michigan	Red Berenson
1999	CCHA	Northern Michigan	5–1	Joe Louis Arena Detroit, Michigan	Red Berenson
2002	CCHA	Michigan State	3–2	Joe Louis Arena Detroit, Michigan	Red Berenson
2003	CCHA	Ferris State	5–3	Joe Louis Arena Detroit, Michigan	Red Berenson
2005	CCHA	Ohio State	4–2	Joe Louis Arena Detroit, Michigan	Red Berenson
2008	CCHA	Miami University	2–1	Joe Louis Arena Detroit, Michigan	Red Berenson
2010	CCHA	Northern Michigan	2–1	Joe Louis Arena Detroit, Michigan	Red Berenson
2016	Big Ten	Minnesota	5–3	Xcel Energy Center Saint Paul, Minnesota	Red Berenson
2022	Big Ten	Minnesota	4–3	3M Arena at Mariucci Minneapolis, Minnesota	Mel Pearson
2023	Big Ten	Minnesota	4–3	3M Arena at Mariucci Minneapolis, Minnesota	Brandon Naurato
2026	Big Ten	Ohio State	7–3	Yost Ice Arena Ann Arbor, Michigan	Brandon Naurato

== NCAA tournament history ==
Including the 2026 NCAA Division I men's ice hockey tournament, Michigan holds several NCAA Men's Ice Hockey Championship records: Tournaments (42, tied), consecutive tournaments (22), and Frozen Four appearances (29). Through the 2026 Tournament, the team has a 59–33 record in the NCAA Tournament, including a 25–20 record in the Frozen Four. The following is the complete history of the Michigan Wolverines men's ice hockey team in the NCAA Men's Ice Hockey Championship.

Year	Seed	First round	Quarterfinals	Semifinals	Finals	Notes
4-team tournament
1948		—	—	Boston College W 6–4 OT	Dartmouth College W 8–4	Fastest consecutive goals record (0:05) still stands (Gordon McMillan and Wally Gacek) vs. Dartmouth
1949		—	—	Dartmouth College L 2–4	Colorado College W 10–4	—
1950		—	—	Boston University L 3–4	Boston College W 10–6	vs. Boston College only tournament game with no penalties for either team
1951		—	—	Boston University W 8–2	Brown W 7–1	Gil Burford's 9 career Frozen Four goals was a record until 1987.
1952		—	—	St. Lawrence W 9–3	Colorado College W 4–1	—
1953		—	—	Boston University W 14–2	Minnesota W 7–3	Single-game record for goals by 1 team in any NCAA tournament game (14), tied in 1954. Second largest win margin in any single tournament game.
1954		—	—	Renssealer L 4–6	Boston College W 7–2	—
1955		—	—	Harvard W 7–3	Colorado College W 5–3	—
1956		—	—	St. Lawrence W 2–1 OT	Michigan Tech W 7–5	—
1957		—	—	Harvard University W 6–1	Colorado College L 6–13	—
1962		—	—	Clarkson L 4–5	St. Lawrence W 5–1	—
1964		—	—	Providence W 3–2	Denver W 6–3	—
5-team tournament
1977	W2	—	Bowling Green W 7–5	Boston University W 6–4	Wisconsin L 5–6 OT	Shortest overtime championship game (0:23)
12-team tournament
1991	W3	Cornell L 4–5 OT, W 6–4, W 9–3	Boston University L 1–4, L 1–8	—	—	—
1992	W1	bye	Northern Michigan W 7–6	Wisconsin L 2–4	—	—
1993	W2	bye	Wisconsin W 4–3 OT	Maine L 3–4 OT	—	—
1994	W1	bye	Lake Superior State L 4–5 OT	—	—	—
1995	W1	bye	Wisconsin W 4–3	Maine L 3–4 3OT	—	Longest overtime tournament game at the time (100:28), surpassed in 2021.
1996	W2	bye	Minnesota W 4–3	Boston University W 4–0	Colorado College W 3–2 OT	—
1997	W1	bye	Minnesota W 7–4	Boston University L 2–3	—	—
1998	W3	Princeton W 2–1	North Dakota W 4–3	New Hampshire W 4–0	Boston College W 3–2 OT	Marty Turco's 9 career Tournament wins and 2 career Frozen Four shutouts are former records.
1999	E5	Denver W 5–3	New Hampshire L 1–2 OT	—	—	—
2000	E5	Colgate W 4–3 OT	Maine L 5–2	—	—	—
2001	W3	Mercyhurst W 4–3	St. Cloud State W 4–3	Boston College L 2–4	—	—
2002	W4	St. Cloud State W 4–2	Denver W 5–3	Minnesota L 2–3	—	—
16-team tournament
2003	MW3	Maine W 2–1	Colorado College W 5–3	Minnesota L 2–3 OT	—	—
2004	NE2	New Hampshire W 4–1	Boston College L 2–3 OT	—	—	—
2005	MW2	Wisconsin W 4–1	Colorado College L 3–4	—	—	—
2006	W3	North Dakota L 1-5	—	—	—	—
2007	W2	North Dakota L 5–8	—	—	—	—
2008	E1	Niagara W 5–1	Clarkson W 2–0	Notre Dame L 4–5 OT	—	—
2009	E1	Air Force L 0–2	—	—	—	—
2010	MW3	Bemidji State W 5–1	Miami L 2–3 2OT	—	—	—
2011	W2	Nebraska-Omaha W 3–2 OT	Colorado College W 2–1	North Dakota W 2–0	Minnesota-Duluth L 2–3 OT	—
2012	MW1	Cornell L 2–3 OT*	—	—	—	—
2016	MW2	Notre Dame W 3–2 OT	North Dakota L 2–5	—	—	—
2018	NE2	Northeastern W 3–2	Boston University W 6–3	Notre Dame L 3–4	—	—
2021	MW2	Minnesota Duluth L No contest	—	—	—	Michigan was removed from the tournament before beginning play due to positive COVID-19 test results and forfeited the game as a result.
2022	MW1	American International W 5–3	Quinnipiac W 7–4	Denver L 2–3 OT	—	—
2023	MW1	Colgate W 11–1	Penn State W 2–1 (OT)	Quinnipiac L 2–5	—	—
2024	MW3	North Dakota W 4–3	Michigan State W 5–2	Boston College L 0–4	—	—
2026	A1	Bentley W 5–1	Minnesota Duluth W 4–3	Denver L 3–4 (2OT)	—	—

== Record by opponent ==
Big Ten Conference opponents

Opponent	GP	W-L-T	Win %	First meeting	Last meeting
Michigan State	346	179–143–24	0.552	5–1 W January 11, 1922	1–6 L February 8, 2025
Minnesota	316	140–156–20	0.475	0–2 L January 22, 1923	2–2 T (SOW); February 15, 2025
Notre Dame	170	93–71–6	0.565	2–3 L February 4, 1923	4–7 L January 11, 2025
Ohio State	166	96-53–16	0.630	21–0 W February 8, 1964	4–3 W February 28, 2025
Penn State	52	31–20–1	0.606	7–3 W February 7, 2014	2–5 L March 8, 2025
Wisconsin	175	91–70–14	0.560	2–1 W (OT); January 12, 1923	4–4 T (SOW); January 25, 2025

Former CCHA opponents

Opponent	GP	W-L-T	Win %	First meeting	Last meeting
Alaska; Independent	55	42–12–1	0.773	8–2 W February 13, 1987	1–4 L January 12, 2013
Bowling Green; CCHA	122	82–37–3	0.684	4–1 W December 29, 1971	4–6 L January 1, 2018
Ferris State; CCHA	107	72–31–4	0.692	5–2 W January 8, 1982	4–1 W December 30, 2019
Lake Superior State; CCHA	125	69–49–7	0.580	6–3 W December 28, 1973	5–1 W October 22, 2022
Miami (OH); NCHC	104	73–27–4	0.721	3–2 W December 11, 1981	6–2 W March 23, 2013
Michigan Tech; CCHA	227	125–94–8	0.568	1–0 W January 17, 1927	0–0 T (OT); December 29, 2021
Nebraska Omaha; NCHC	38	27–8–3	0.750	6–2 W December 10, 1999	4–3 W November 16, 2013
Northern Michigan; CCHA	66	39–20–7	0.644	3–0 W December 19, 1981	3–2 W December 29, 2015
Western Michigan; NCHC	124	77–37–10	0.661	5–4 W November 23, 1979	2–1 W November 30, 2024

Major non-conference opponents

Opponent	GP	W-L-T	Win %	First meeting	Last meeting
Boston College; Hockey East	20	11–9–0	0.550	6–4 W (OT); March 18, 1948	0–4 L April 11, 2024
Boston University; Hockey East	34	20–14–0	0.588	3–4 L March 17, 1950	5–4 W (OT); November 2, 2024
Colorado College; NCHC	98	59–36–3	0.617	2–4 L December 15, 1939	2–1 W March 26, 2011
Cornell; ECAC	8	3–4–1	.438	7–1 W January 2, 1965	1–5 L November 24, 2012
Denver; NCHC	85	36–48–1	0.429	5–4 W February 5, 1951	3–4 L (2OT); April 9, 2026
Harvard; ECAC	10	6–2–2	0.700	0–7 L December 30, 1930	4–1 W November 26, 2022
Maine; Hockey East	7	4–3–0	.571	3–1 W December 29, 1990	2–1 W March 29, 2003
Minnesota-Duluth; NCHC	43	24–18–1	0.570	8–4 W January 7, 1964	5–1 W October 15, 2021
North Dakota; NCHC	92	47–41–4	0.527	5–6 L January 9, 1948	4–3 W March 29, 2024
Providence; Hockey East	5	4–1–0	.800	3–2 W March 20, 1964	5–4 W October 8, 2023
RPI; ECAC	14	6–7–1	.464	4–6 L March 12, 1954	5–2 W October 24, 2015
UMass; Hockey East	4	3–1–0	.750	4–1 W January 8, 2022	3–6 L October 14, 2023
Union; ECAC	4	1–2–1	.375	3–6 L November 27, 2011	4–0 W October 8, 2016
Yale; ECAC	12	8–4–0	0.667	1–7 L December 30, 1929	3–2 W October 30, 1999

== Head coaching history and current staff ==
=== Current coaching staff ===
As of 2026–27

Name	Position coached	Seasons at Michigan
Brandon Naurato	Head coach	5th
Chris Lazary	Associate head coach	1st
Mathew Deschamps	Assistant coach	4th
Kevin Reiter	Assistant coach	4th
Evan Hall	Director of Hockey Operations	4th
Andrew Brewer	General Manager/Chief of Staff	1st

=== All-time coaching records ===
As of April 10, 2026

Tenure	Coach	Years	Record	Pct.
1922–1927	Joseph Barss	5	26–21–4	.549
1927–1944	Eddie Lowrey	17	124–136–21	.479
1944–1957	Vic Heyliger	13	228–61–13	.776
1957–1973	Al Renfrew	16	222–207–11	.517
1973–1980	Dan Farrell	7	135–129–6	.511
1980	Wilf Martin^	1^	1–1–0	.500
1980–1984	John Giordano	4	68–75–6	.477
1984–2017	Red Berenson	33	848–426–92	.654
2017–2022	Mel Pearson	5	99–65–16	.594
2022–present	Brandon Naurato	4	98–50–10	.652
Totals	10 coaches	104 seasons	1,849–1,171–179	.606

^ Martin coached the first two games of the 1980–81 season before Giordano took over the coaching duties.

== Honored players and current roster ==
=== Current roster ===
As of September 1, 2025.

No.	Nat.	Player	Class	Pos	Height	Weight	DoB	Hometown	Previous team	NHL rights
3	(United States)	Hunter Hady	Sophomore	D	6' 4" (1.93 m)	205 lb (93 kg)	2004-08-02	Rochester, Minnesota	Chicago (USHL)	—
4	(United States)	Asher Barnett	Freshman	D	6' 1" (1.85 m)	201 lb (91 kg)	2007-05-16	Wilmette, Illinois	USNTDP (USHL)	EDM, 131st overall 2025
5	(United States)	Tyler Duke (A)	Senior	D	5' 10" (1.78 m)	190 lb (86 kg)	2004-07-19	Strongsville, Ohio	Ohio State (Big Ten)	—
6	(United States)	Josh Eernisse	Senior	F	6' 2" (1.88 m)	215 lb (98 kg)	2004-12-31	Apple Valley, Minnesota	St. Thomas (CCHA)	—
7	(United States)	Dakoda Rhéaume-Mullen	Sophomore	D	6' 1" (1.85 m)	192 lb (87 kg)	2006-12-18	Northville, Michigan	USNTDP (USHL)	—
8	(United States)	Teddy Spitznagel	Freshman	F	6' 3" (1.91 m)	195 lb (88 kg)	2006-04-06	Bloomfield Hills, Michigan	Muskegon (USHL)	—
9	(Canada)	Nick Moldenhauer	Junior	F	5' 11" (1.8 m)	185 lb (84 kg)	2004-05-25	Mississauga, Ontario	Chicago (USHL)	TOR, 95th overall 2022
10	(United States)	Drew Schock	Freshman	D	6' 0" (1.83 m)	182 lb (83 kg)	2007-02-07	Green Bay, Wisconsin	USNTDP (USHL)	ANA, 101st overall 2025
10	(United States)	Cole McKinney	Freshman	F	6' 0" (1.83 m)	200 lb (91 kg)	2007-03-16	Lake Forest, Illinois	USNTDP (USHL)	SJS, 53rd overall 2025
13	(Canada)	T. J. Hughes (C)	Senior	F	6' 0" (1.83 m)	185 lb (84 kg)	2001-11-09	Hamilton, Ontario	Brooks (AJHL)	—
15	(United States)	Aidan Park	Freshman	F	6' 1" (1.85 m)	187 lb (85 kg)	2006-01-06	Playa Vista, California	Green Bay (USHL)	EDM, 223rd overall 2025
17	(United States)	Garrett Schifsky	Junior	F	5' 9" (1.75 m)	180 lb (82 kg)	2003-04-08	Andover, Minnesota	Waterloo (USHL)	—
18	(Canada)	Jayden Perron	Junior	F	5' 9" (1.75 m)	175 lb (79 kg)	2005-01-11	Winnipeg, Manitoba	North Dakota (NCHC)	CAR, 94th overall 2023
19	(Canada)	Michael Hage	Sophomore	F	6' 1" (1.85 m)	190 lb (86 kg)	2006-04-14	Oakville, Ontario	Chicago (USHL)	MTL, 21st overall 2024
21	(United States)	Ben Robertson	Junior	F	5' 11" (1.8 m)	197 lb (89 kg)	2004-09-18	Potomac Falls, Virginia	Cornell (ECAC)	—
23	(United States)	Miles Gust	Sophomore	D	5' 9" (1.75 m)	180 lb (82 kg)	2004-03-17	Chicago, Illinois	Muskegon (USHL)	—
27	(Canada)	Malcolm Spence	Freshman	F	6' 2" (1.88 m)	190 lb (86 kg)	2006-09-22	Mississauga, Ontario	Erie (OHL)	NYR, 43rd overall 2025
31	(United States)	Stephen Peck	Freshman	G	6' 3" (1.91 m)	183 lb (83 kg)	2005-01-18	New York, New York	Muskegon (USHL)	—
33	(United States)	Kienan Draper (A)	Senior	F	6' 2" (1.88 m)	212 lb (96 kg)	2002-02-19	Bloomfield Hills, Michigan	Chilliwack (BCHL)	DET, 187th overall 2020
34	(Canada)	Julian Molinaro	Sophomore	G	5' 11" (1.8 m)	185 lb (84 kg)	2003-12-02	Mississauga, Ontario	Northern Michigan (CCHA)	—
44	(United States)	Will Horcoff	Sophomore	F	6' 5" (1.96 m)	203 lb (92 kg)	2007-01-23	Birmingham, Michigan	USNTDP (USHL)	PIT, 24th overall 2025
63	(Canada)	Luca Fantilli (A)	Senior	D	6' 0" (1.83 m)	187 lb (85 kg)	2002-12-30	Nobleton, Ontario	Chicago (USHL)	—
68	(Canada)	Josh Orrico	Junior	D	5' 9" (1.75 m)	180 lb (82 kg)	2003-06-15	Woodbridge, Ontario	Janesville (NAHL)	—
72	(Canada)	Jack Ivankovic	Freshman	G	6' 0" (1.83 m)	172 lb (78 kg)	2007-05-22	Mississauga, Ontario	Brampton (OHL)	NSH, 58th overall 2025
88	(Canada)	Henry Mews	Freshman	D	6' 1" (1.85 m)	190 lb (86 kg)	2006-03-09	Ottawa, Ontario	Sudbury (OHL)	CGY, 74th overall 2024
92	(Canada)	Adam Valentini	Freshman	F	5' 11" (1.8 m)	185 lb (84 kg)	2008-04-11	Toronto, Ontario	Chicago (USHL)	—
93	(United States)	Matthew Mania	Freshman	D	6' 1" (1.85 m)	190 lb (86 kg)	2005-01-11	Brandon, Florida	Flint (OHL)	—

Michigan has had numerous players recognized with prestigious awards and honors. The following is a summary of some of the other standout Michigan Wolverines men's ice hockey players.

=== U.S. Hockey Hall of Fame ===
The following individuals have been inducted into the United States Hockey Hall of Fame.

- Vic Heyliger (1974)
- Willard Ikola (1990)
- John Matchefts (1991)
- Wally Grant (1994)
- John MacInnes (2007)
- Red Berenson (2018)

=== Hobey Baker Award winners ===
The following players have been awarded the Hobey Baker Award.

- Brendan Morrison (1997)
- Kevin Porter (2008)
- Adam Fantilli (2023)

=== Player of the year ===
The Hockey News U.S. College Player of the Year

- David Oliver (1994)
- Brendan Morrison (1996, 1997)

Central Collegiate Hockey Association

- David Oliver (1994)
- Brendan Morrison (1996, 1997)
- Kevin Porter (2008)

Western Collegiate Hockey Association

- Red Berenson (1962)
- Gordon Wilkie (1964)
- Mel Wakabayashi (1966)

Tim Taylor Award

- Kyle Connor (2016)
- Thomas Bordeleau (2021)
- Adam Fantilli (2023)

=== Academic All-American ===
Michigan has had two hockey Academic All-Americans.

- Zach Hyman (2015, first team)
- Jeff Jillson (2001, second team)

=== Winter Olympic medalists ===
Michigan has had twenty-one players and one coach participate in the Winter Olympics. Seven of these participants earned Olympic medals.

- Willard Ikola (1956 silver medal, United States)
- John Matchefts (1956 silver medal, United States)
- Bob White (1956 bronze medal, Canada)
- Todd Brost (1992 silver medal, Canada)
- David Harlock (1994 silver medal, Canada)
- Jack Johnson (2010 silver medal, United States)
- Carl Hagelin (2014 silver medal, Sweden)
- Kyle Connor (2026 gold medal, United States)
- Quinn Hughes (2026 gold medal, United States)
- Dylan Larkin (2026 gold medal, United States)
- Zach Werenski (2026 gold medal, United States)

=== All-Americans ===
Fifty-four Michigan Wolverines men's ice hockey players have been chosen as First team Division I All-Americans by the American Hockey Coaches Association.

- Ross Smith (1948, 1950)
- Wally Gacek (1949)
- Wally Grant (1949)
- Connie Hill (1949)
- Dick Starrak (1949)
- Gil Burford (1951)
- Neil Celley (1951)
- Bob Heathcott (1951)
- John McKennell (1951)
- Alex MacLellan (1953)
- Lorne Howes (1956)
- Bob Schiller (1956)
- Bill MacFarland (1956)
- Bob White (1958, 1959)
- Bob Watt (1959)
- Red Berenson (1961, 1962)
- Tom Polanic (1964)
- Gordon Wilkie (1964)
- Mel Wakabayashi (1965)
- Jim Keough (1968)
- Robbie Moore (1974)
- Dave Debol (1977)
- Murray Eaves (1980)
- Paul Fricker (1981)
- Myles O'Connor (1989)
- Denny Felsner (1992)
- David Oliver (1994)
- Brian Wiseman (1994)
- Brendan Morrison (1995–97)
- Marty Turco (1997)
- John Madden (1997)
- Bill Muckalt (1998)
- Jeff Jillson (2000)
- Andy Hilbert (2001)
- Mike Komisarek (2002)
- Mike Cammalleri (2002)
- T.J. Hensick (2005, 2007)
- Jack Johnson (2007)
- Kevin Porter (2008)
- Louie Caporusso (2009)
- Aaron Palushaj (2009)
- Jacob Trouba (2013)
- Zach Hyman (2015)
- Kyle Connor (2016)
- Tyler Motte (2016)
- Zach Werenski (2016)
- Quinn Hughes (2019)
- Cameron York (2021)
- Matty Beniers (2022)
- Adam Fantilli (2023)
- Luke Hughes (2023)
- Seamus Casey (2024)
- Gavin Brindley (2024)
- T. J. Hughes (2026)

== Statistical leaders and accomplishments ==
=== Career points leaders ===
Player	Years	GP	G	A	Pts	PIM
Brendan Morrison	1993–1997	155	102	182	284	159
Denny Felsner	1988–1992	162	139	122	261	150
Brian Wiseman	1990–1994	166	84	164	248	216
David Roberts	1989–1993	169	90	157	247	198
Dave Debol	1974–1978	166	112	134	246	88
Brad Jones	1983–1987	147	89	138	227	202
Bill Muckalt	1994–1998	162	105	121	226	239
T. J. Hensick	2003–2007	131	75	147	222	100
Neil Celley	1945–1946, 1948–1951	106	119	96	215	62
Gordon McMillan	1945–1949	92	99	114	213	71

=== Career goaltending leaders ===
GP = Games played; Min = Minutes played; W = Wins; L = Losses; T = Ties; GA = Goals against; SO = Shutouts; SV% = Save percentage; GAA = Goals against average

Minimum 1,000 minutes

Player	Years	GP	Min	W	L	T	GA	SO	SV%	GAA
Shawn Hunwick	2007–2012	87	5117	54	24	7	176	10	.928	2.06
Strauss Mann	2018–2021	77	4429	34	29	9	158	11	.926	2.14
Bryan Hogan	2007–2011	85	4811	52	25	2	175	7	.909	2.18
Josh Blackburn	1998–2002	150	8818	91	37	20	334	4	.905	2.27
Marty Turco	1994–1998	165	9334	127	28	7	361	15	.898	2.32

Statistics current through the start of the 2020–21 season.

=== Statistical accomplishments ===
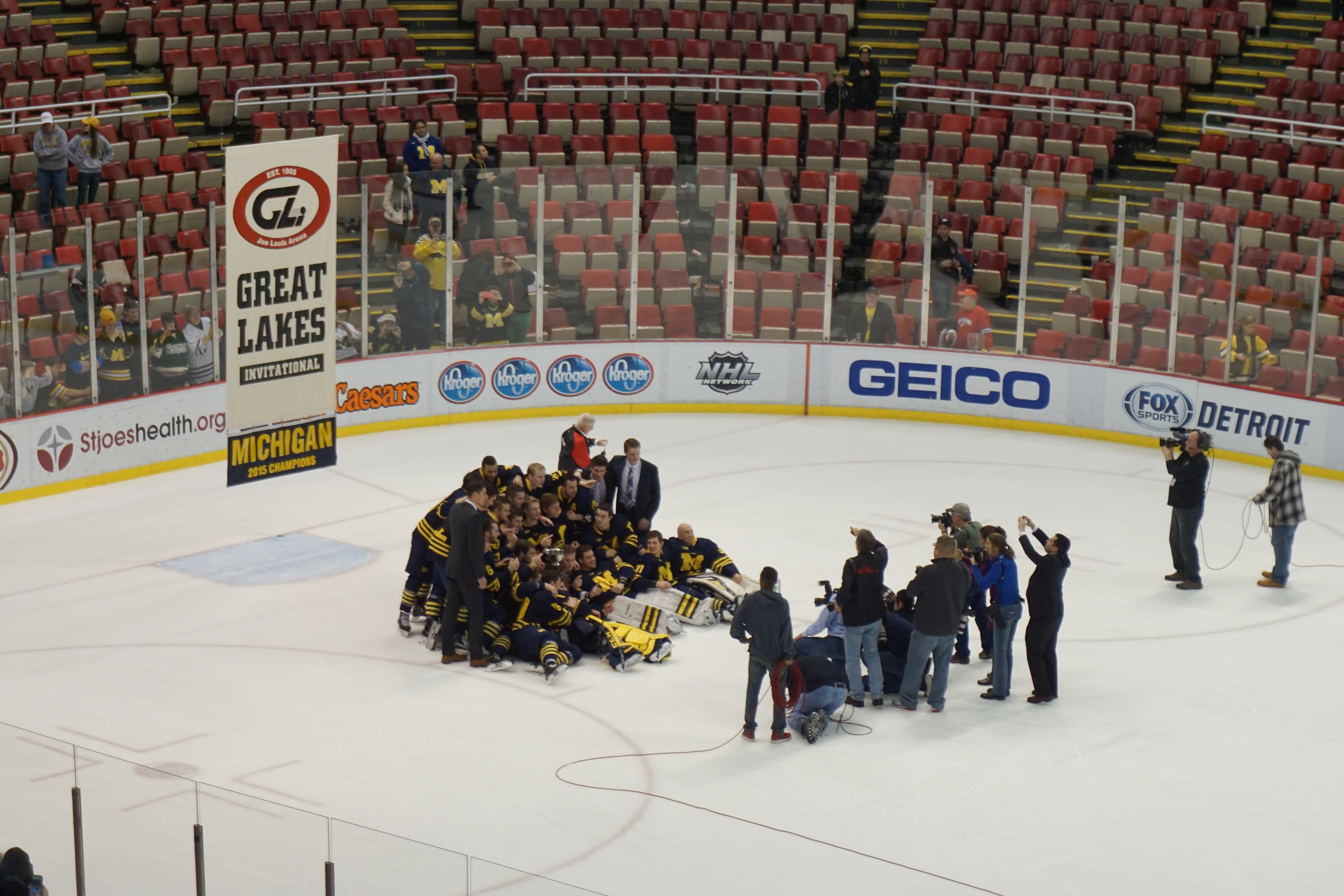
Michigan posing with the Great Lakes Invitational banner after winning in 2015

The all-time Michigan single-season goal scoring leaders are Red Berenson (1961–62) and Dave Debol (1976–77) who have each totaled 43. Denny Felsner (1988–92) has totaled 139 in his career for the school record. Brendan Morrison holds the school record for both single-season and career assists with 57 (1996–97) and 182 (1994–97), respectively. Debol (99, 1976–77) and Morrison (284, 1994–97) hold the single-season and career points records, respectively.

On defense, Marty Turco holds the single-season and career win records with 34 (1995–96) and 127 (1995–98). The single-season goals against average is held by Billy Sauer (1.95, 2007–08), while the career record is held by Shawn Hunwick (2.21, 2007–2012). Shawn Hunwick holds the single-season save percentage record, (.925, 2010–11), and also holds the career record (.924, 2007–2012). Montoya's 6 single-season shutouts (2003–2004) is the school record while Turco's 15 is the career record.

==== Current national individual records ====
The following Michigan Wolverines men's ice hockey players hold NCAA Division I national records:

- John Madden – single-season shorthanded goals – (10, 1996)
- John Madden – career shorthanded goals – (23, 1994–97)
- Robbie Moore – career saves – (4434, 1973–76)
- Marty Turco – career wins – (127, 1995–98)

==== Former national individual records ====
The following Michigan Wolverines men's ice hockey players formerly held NCAA Division I national records:

- Neil Celley – single-season points per game (2.93 1951–1952)
- Gordon McMillan – single-season points per game (2.70 1948–1949)
- Neil Celley – single-season goals per game (1.48 1951–1952)
- Gil Burford – single-season goal points per game (1.48 1950–1952)
- Karl Bagnell – single-season saves (1305, 1972–75)
- Gordon McMillan – career points per game (2.54, 1949–1954)
- Gil Burford – career goals per game (1.30 1951–1952)
- Wally Gacek – career goals per game (1.21 1949–1951)
- Gordon McMillan – career assists per game (1.38, 1949–1952)
- David Oliver – career game-winning goals (21, 1994–2006)
- Steve Shields – career wins (111, 1991–94)

==== Recent individual national statistical champions ====
The following Michigan Wolverines men's ice hockey players have been national statistical champions:

- Brendan Morrison – points per game (2.02, 1997)
- T. J. Hensick – points per game (1.68, 2007)
- Brendan Morrison – assists per game (1.31, 1997)
- T. J. Hensick – assists per game (1.12, 2007)
- Jason Botterill – power play goals (19, 1997)
- John Madden – short-handed goals (10, 1996)
- John Madden – short-handed goals (8, 1997)
- Scott Matzka – short-handed goals (6, 2000)
- Dale Rominski – game-winning goals (8, 1999)
- Chad Kolarik – game-winning goals (7, 2008)
- Marty Turco – goalie winning percentage (.850, 1997)
- Billy Sauer – goalie winning percentage (.851, 2008)

==== Current national records (team) ====
The following Michigan Wolverines men's ice hockey teams hold NCAA Division I national records:

- Largest single-game margin of victory (21–0, vs. Ohio State, February 8, 1964)
- Most single-season overtime wins (6, 1998)

In addition, the 2005 and 2007 teams led the nation in goals per game, and the 1996 and 1997 teams led the nation in both goals allowed per game and scoring margin per game.

== Yost Ice Arena ==
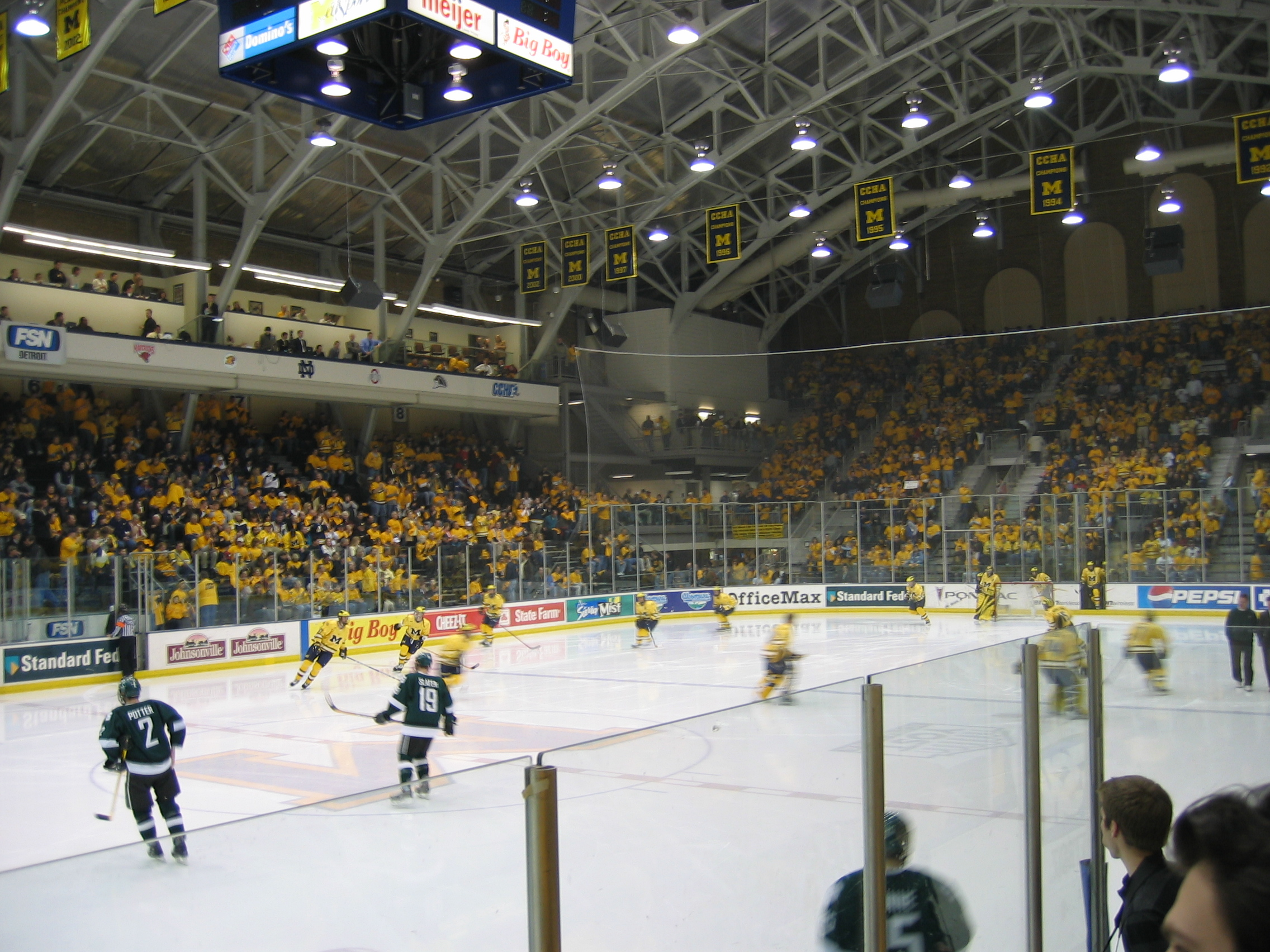
Interior of Yost Ice Arena

Built in 1923 as a field house, the facility is named in honor of Michigan's legendary football coach and athletic director, Fielding H. Yost. For many years, it housed the Michigan basketball team, until they relocated to the larger Crisler Arena in 1967. It also housed the track teams in the 1950s. In 1973, it was converted into an ice arena, and the Michigan hockey team has used it ever since. The University of Michigan's Senior and Collegiate synchronized skating and freestyle teams also practice at Yost. In addition, local high school teams, recreational leagues (AAAHA) and the university's intramural hockey league call it home.

The arena has served as home of Michigan hockey since the 1973–74 season, hosting over 3 million fans. The Wolverines have won over 450 victories at home in this time.

Yost Ice Arena has hosted NCAA Ice Hockey Tournament games five times in its history, most recently in 2003.

== Outdoor games ==
Game	Date	Matchup	Result	Attendance	Site	Location
The Cold War	October 6, 2001	No. 5 Michigan at No. 1 Michigan State	T 3–3	74,554	Spartan Stadium	East Lansing, Michigan
Camp Randall Hockey Classic	February 6, 2010	No. 19 Michigan at No. 3 Wisconsin	L 2–3	55,031	Camp Randall Stadium	Madison, Wisconsin
The Big Chill at the Big House	December 11, 2010	No. 12 Michigan vs Michigan State	W 5–0	113,411	Michigan Stadium	Ann Arbor, Michigan
Frozen Diamond Faceoff	January 15, 2012	No. 15 Michigan at No. 2 Ohio State	W 4–1	25,831	Progressive Field	Cleveland, Ohio
Great Lakes Invitational	December 27, 2013	No. 3 Michigan vs. Western Michigan	L 2–3 (OT)	25,449	Comerica Park	Detroit, Michigan
Great Lakes Invitational	December 28, 2013	No. 3 Michigan vs. Michigan State	L 0–3	26,052	Comerica Park	Detroit, Michigan
Hockey City Classic	February 7, 2015	No. 14 Michigan vs. Michigan State	W 4–1	22,751	Soldier Field	Chicago
Let's Take This Outside Classic	January 5, 2019	Michigan vs. No. 6 Notre Dame	W 4–2	23,422	Notre Dame Stadium	South Bend, Indiana
Faceoff on the Lake	February 18, 2023	No. 4 Michigan vs. No. 10 Ohio State	L 2–4	45,523	FirstEnergy Stadium	Cleveland, Ohio
The Frozen Confines: Big Ten Hockey Series	January 3, 2025	No. 9 Michigan vs. No. 13 Ohio State	L 3–4		Wrigley Field	Chicago

== Rivalries ==
=== Michigan State ===
Michigan and Michigan State first played each other in 1922. Michigan and Michigan State began playing a neutral site game in Detroit once a year in the "Duel in the D" series in which Michigan leads the series 19–14–5. Michigan leads the all-time series between the teams, 182–147–24.

=== Minnesota ===
Michigan and Minnesota first played each other in 1923. Minnesota leads the all-time series between the teams, 157–143–20.

=== Notre Dame ===
Michigan and Notre Dame first played each other in 1923. Michigan leads the all-time series between the teams, 98–71–6.

=== Ohio State ===
Michigan and Ohio State first played each other in 1964. Michigan leads the all-time series between the teams, 105–53–16.

== Wolverines in the NHL ==
As of July 1, 2025.

= NHL All-Star team	= NHL All-Star	= NHL All-Star and NHL All-Star team	= Hall of Famers

Player	Position	Team(s)	Years	Games	Stanley Cups
John Beecher	Center	BOS	2023–present	130	0
Matty Beniers	Center	SEA	2021–present	249	0
Red Berenson	Center	MTL, NYR, STL, DET	1962–1978	987	1
Bubba Berenzweig	Defenseman	NSH	2000–2003	37	0
Nick Blankenburg	Defenseman	CBJ, NSH	2021–present	115	0
John Blum	Defenseman	EDM, BOS, WSH, DET	1983–1990	250	0
Thomas Bordeleau	Center	SJS	2021–present	44	0
Jason Botterill	Left Wing	DAL, ATL, CGY, BUF	1998–2004	88	0
Gavin Brindley	Center	CBJ	2023–2024	1	0
Brendan Brisson	Center	VGK	2023–present	24	0
Chris Brown	Center	PHX, WSH	2012–2016	23	0
Mike Brown	Right Wing	VAN, ANA, TOR, EDM, SJS, MTL	2007–2016	407	0
Mike Buchanan	Defenseman	CHI	1952	1	0
Mike Cammalleri	Forward	LAK, CGY, MTL, NJD, EDM	2003–2018	906	0
Seamus Casey	Defenseman	NJD	2024–present	14	0
Andrew Cogliano	Left Wing/Center	EDM, ANA, DAL, SJS, COL	2008–2024	1,294	1
J. T. Compher	Left Wing	COL, DET	2017–present	576	1
Mike Comrie	Center	EDM, PHI, PHX, OTT, NYI, PIT	2001–2011	589	0
Kyle Connor	Left Wing	WPG	2017–present	631	0
Andrew Copp	Center	WPG, NYR, DET	2015–present	700	0
Greg Crozier	Left Wing	PIT	2001	1	0
Dave Debol	Center	HAR	1979–1981	92	0
Phillip Di Giuseppe	Left Wing	CAR, NSH, NYR, VAN	2016–present	302	0
Dylan Duke	Left wing	TBL	2024–present	2	0
Murray Eaves	Center	WIN, DET	1981–1990	57	0
Andrew Ebbett	Center	ANA, CHI, MIN, PHX, VAN, PIT	2008–2015	224	0
Adam Fantilli	Center	CBJ	2023–present	131	0
Denny Felsner	Right Wing	STL	1991–1995	18	0
Greg Fox	Defenseman	ATF, CHI, PIT	1978–1985	494	0
Luke Glendening	Center	DET, DAL, TBL	2014–present	864	0
Robb Gordon	Center	VAN	1999	4	0
Carl Hagelin	Left Wing	NYR, ANA, PIT, LAK, WSH	2012–2023	713	2
Steven Halko	Defenseman	CAR	1998–2003	155	0
Gord Hampson	Left Wing	CGY	1983	4	0
David Harlock	Left Wing	TOR, WSH, NYI, ATL	1994–2002	212	0
Dwight Helminen	Center	CAR, SJS	2009–2010	27	0
T. J. Hensick	Center	COL, STL	2008–2011	112	0
Matt Herr	Center	WSH, FLA, BOS	1999–2003	58	0
Vic Heyliger	Center	CHI	1938–1944	33	0
Andy Hilbert	Center	BOS, CHI, PIT, NYI, MIN	2001–2010	307	0
Luke Hughes	Defenseman	NJD	2022–present	155	0
Pat Hughes	Right Wing	MTL, PIT, EDM, BUF, STL, HAR	1978–1987	573	3
Quinn Hughes	Defenseman	VAN, MIN	2018–present	433	0
Matt Hunwick	Defenseman	BOS, COL, NYR, TOR, PIT, BUF	2008–2019	535	0
Shawn Hunwick	Goaltender	CBJ	2012	1	0
Zach Hyman	Center	TOR, EDM	2016–present	653	0
Jeff Jillson	Defenseman	SJS, BOS, BUF	2002–2006	140	0
Jack Johnson	Defenseman	LAK, CBJ, PIT, NYR, COL, CHI	2007–present	1,228	1
Kent Johnson	Center	CBJ	2021–present	198	0
Brad Jones	Left Wing	WIN, LAK, PHI	1987–1992	148	0
Steven Kampfer	Defenseman	BOS, MIN, FLA, NYR	2011–2021	231	0
Mike Knuble	Right Wing	DET, NYR, BOS, PHI, WSH	1997–2013	1,068	1
Chad Kolarik	Center	CBJ, NYR	2010–2011	6	0
Mike Komisarek	Defenseman	MTL, TOR, CAR	2003–2014	551	0
Jack LaFontaine	Goaltender	CAR	2022	2	0
Josh Langfeld	Right Wing	OTT, SJS, BOS, DET, NSH	2002–2008	143	0
Dylan Larkin	Center	DET	2016–present	734	0
Will Lockwood	Right Wing	VAN, FLA	2020–2024	54	0
Warren Luhning	Right Wing	NYI, DAL	1998–2000	29	0
Brian Lundberg	Defenseman	PIT	1983	1	0

Player	Position	Team(s)	Years	Games	Stanley Cups
John Madden	Center	NJD, CHI , MIN, FLA	1999–2012	898	3
Kris Manery	Center/Right Wing	CLE, MNS, VAN, WIN	1978–1981	250	0
Cooper Marody	Center	EDM	2019–2022	7	0
Wally Maxwell	Center	TOR	1953	2	0
John McCahill	Defenseman	COR	1978	1	0
Rutger McGroarty	Center	PIT	2024–present	8	0
Jon Merrill	Defenseman	NJD, VGK, DET, MTL, MIN	2014–present	682	0
Al Montoya	Goaltender	PHX, NYI, WPG, FLA, MTL, EDM	2009–2018	168	0
Robbie Moore	Goaltender	PHI, WSH	1979–1983	6	0
Angie Moretto	Center	CLE	1977	5	0
Brendan Morrison	Center	NJD, VAN, ANA, DAL, WSH, CGY, CHI	1998–2012	934	0
Gary Morrison	Right Wing	PHI	1980–1982	43	0
David Moss	Left Wing	CGY, PHX/ARI	2007–2015	501	0
Tyler Motte	Center	CHI, CBJ, VAN, NYR, OTT, TBL, DET	2017–present	455	0
Bill Muckalt	Right Wing	VAN, NYI, OTT, MIN	1999–2003	256	0
Frank Nazar	Center	CHI	2023–Present	56	0
Patrick Neaton	Defenseman	PIT	1994	9	0
Boo Nieves	Center	NYR	2017–2020	76	0
Josh Norris	Center	OTT, BUF	2020–present	239	0
Jeff Norton	Defenseman	NYI, SJS, STL, EDM, TBL, FLA, PIT, BOS	1988–2002	799	0
Eric Nystrom	Left Wing	CGY, MIN, DAL, NSH	2006–2016	593	0
Myles O'Connor	Defenseman	NJD, MDA	1991–1994	43	0
David Oliver	Right Wing	EDM, NYR, OTT, PHX, DAL	1995–2006	233	0
Jed Ortmeyer	Center	NYR, NSH, SJS, MIN	2004–2012	345	0
Max Pacioretty	Left Wing	MTL, VGK, CAR, WSH, TOR	2009–present	939	0
Rob Palmer	Defenseman	LAK, NJD	1978–1984	320	0
Aaron Palushaj	Right Wing	MTL, COL, CAR	2011–2014	68	0
Greg Pateryn	Defenseman	MTL, DAL, MIN, COL, SJS, ANA	2013–2022	290	0
Kevin Porter	Center	PHX, COL, BUF, PIT	2009–2017	249	1
Erik Portillo	Goaltender	LAK	2024–present	1	0
Owen Power	Defenseman	BUF	2021–present	242	0
Kevin Quick	Defenseman	TBL	2009	6	0
Danny Richmond	Defenseman	CAR, CHI	2006–2008	49	0
Steve Richmond	Defenseman	NYR, DET, NJD, LAK	1984–1989	159	0
Dave Richter	Defenseman	MNS, PHI, VAN, STL	1982–1990	365	0
David Roberts	Left Wing	STL, EDM, VAN	1994–1998	125	0
Dale Rominski	Right Wing	TBL	2000	3	0
Jason Ryznar	Left Wing	NJD	2006	8	0
Jason Ryznar	Left Wing	NJD	2006	8	0
Mackie Samoskevich	Right Wing	FLA	2023–present	79	1
Scott Sharples	Goaltender	CGY	1992	1	0
John Sherf	Left Wing	DET	1936–1944	19	1
Steve Shields	Goaltender	BUF, SJS, MDA, BOS, FLA, ATL	1996–2006	246	0
Blake Sloan	Right Wing	DAL, CBJ, CGY	1999–2004	290	1
Ted Speers	Right Wing	DET	1986	4	0
Cam Stewart	Left Wing	BOS, FLA, MIN	1994–2001	202	0
Chris Summers	Defenseman	PHX/ARI, NYR	2011–2016	70	0
Jeff Tambellini	Left Wing	LAK, NYI, VAN	2006–2011	242	0
Chris Tamer	Defenseman	PIT, NYR, ATL	1994–2004	644	0
Jacob Trouba	Defenseman	WPG, NYR, ANA	2014–present	825	0
Marty Turco	Goaltender	DAL, CHI, BOS	2001–2012	543	0
Travis Turnbull	Center	BUF	2012	3	0
Brad Turner	Defenseman	NYI	1992	3	0
Dean Turner	Defenseman	NYR, CLR, LAK	1979–1983	35	0
Mike Van Ryn	Defenseman	STL, FLA, TOR	2001–2009	353	0
Aaron Ward	Defenseman	DET, CAR, NYR, BOS, ANA	1994–2010	839	3
Zach Werenski	Defenseman	CBJ	2017–present	567	0
Brian Wiseman	Center	TOR	1997	3	0
Cam York	Defenseman	PHI	2020–present	235	0

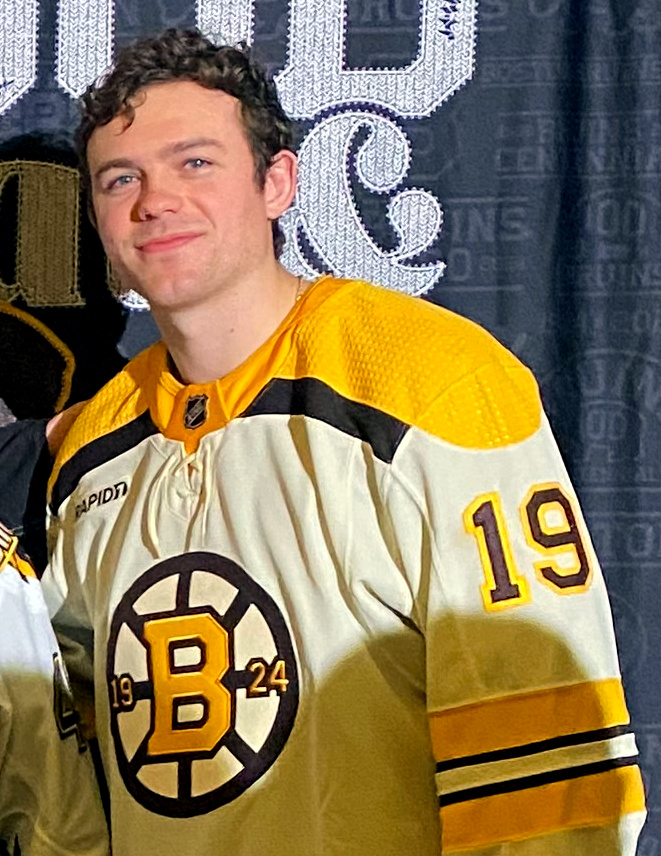
John Beecher

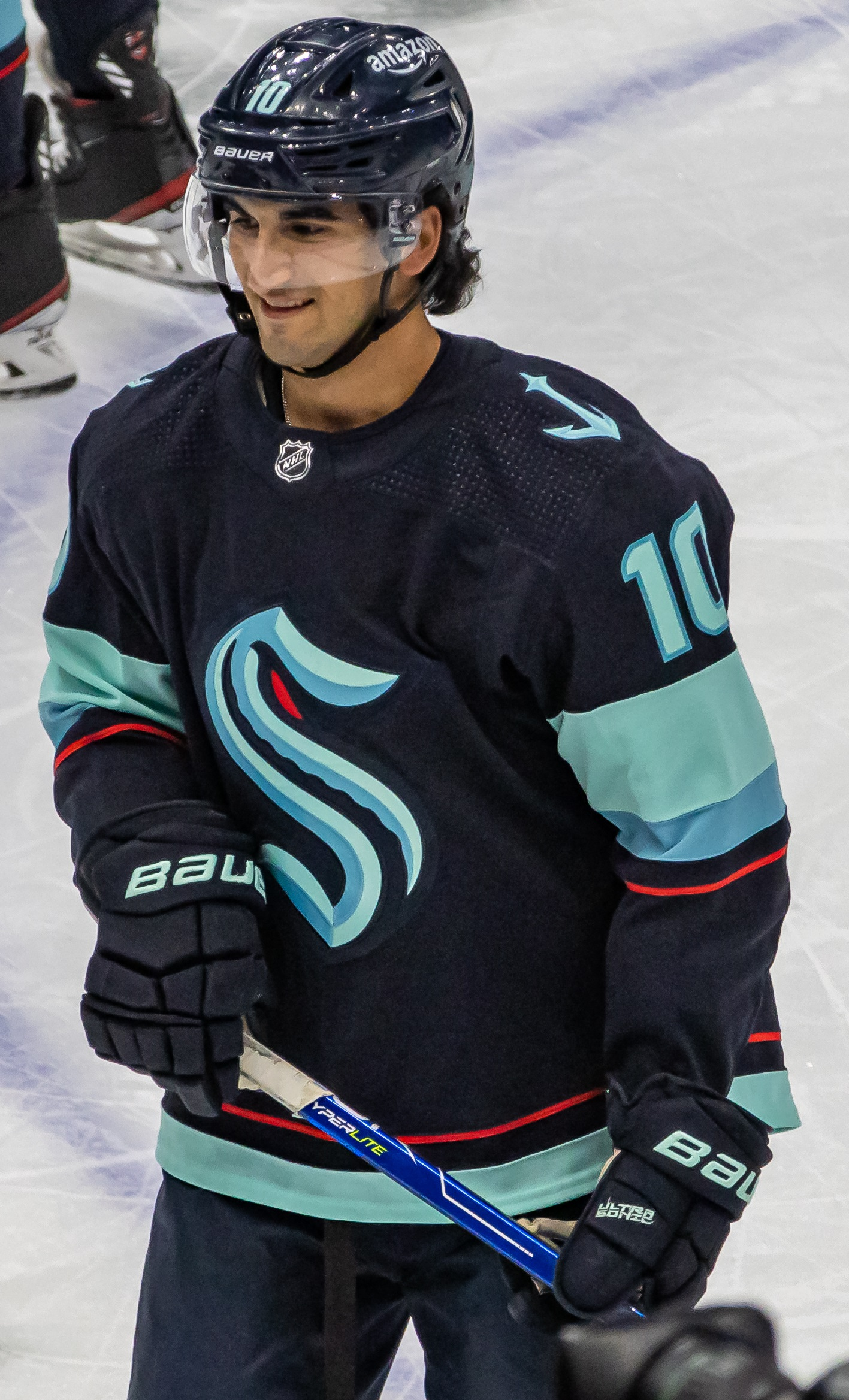
Matty Beniers

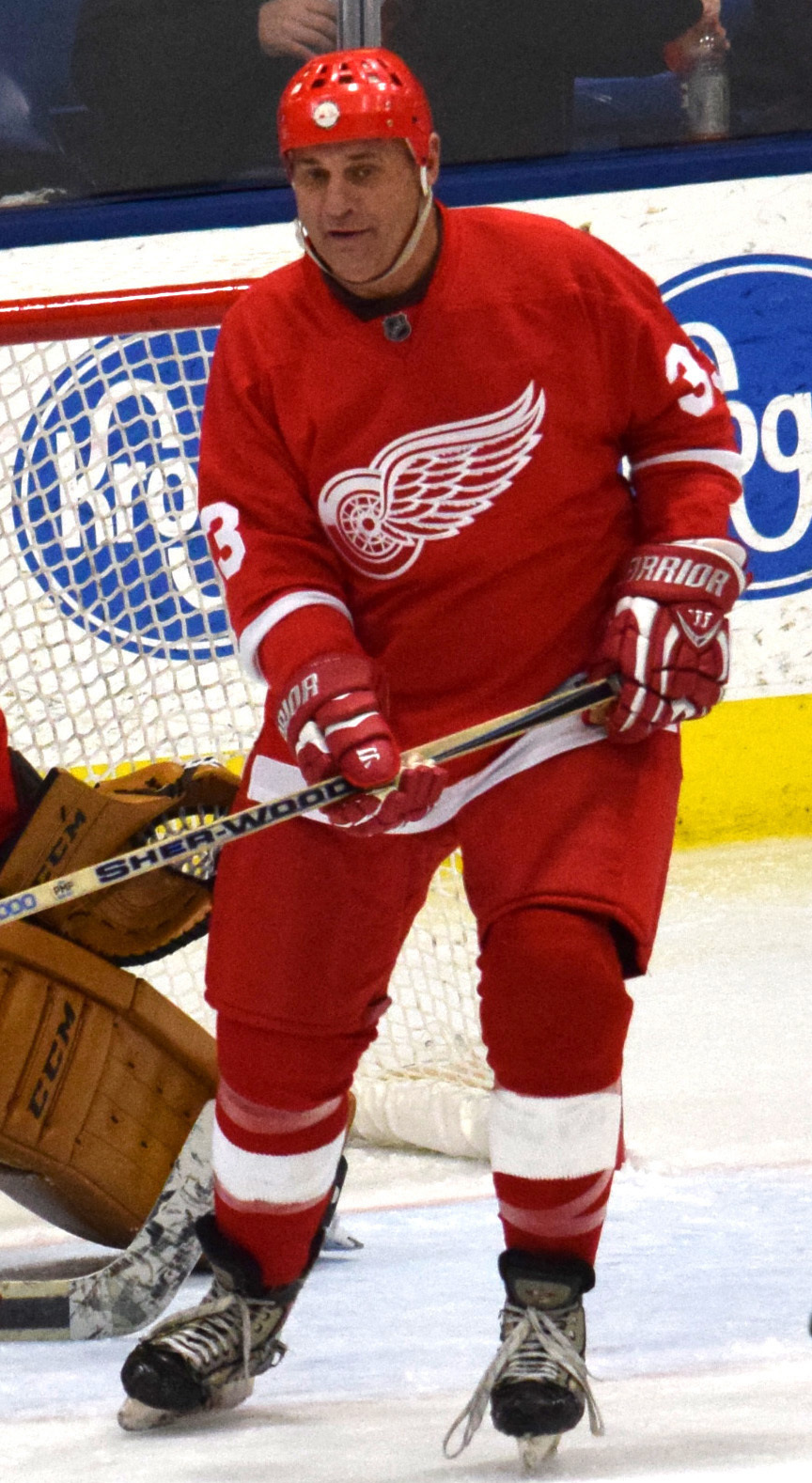
John Blum

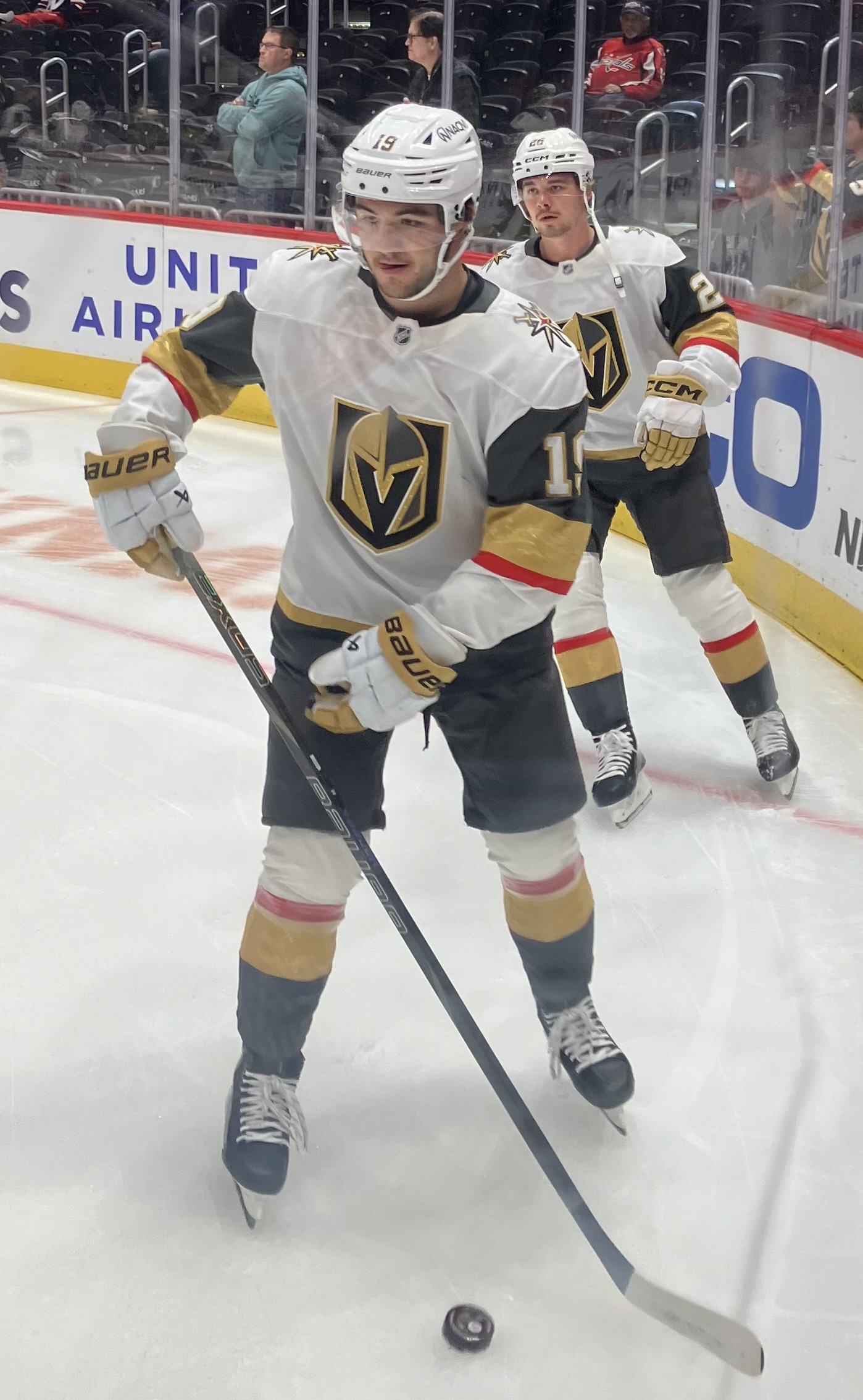
Brendan Brisson

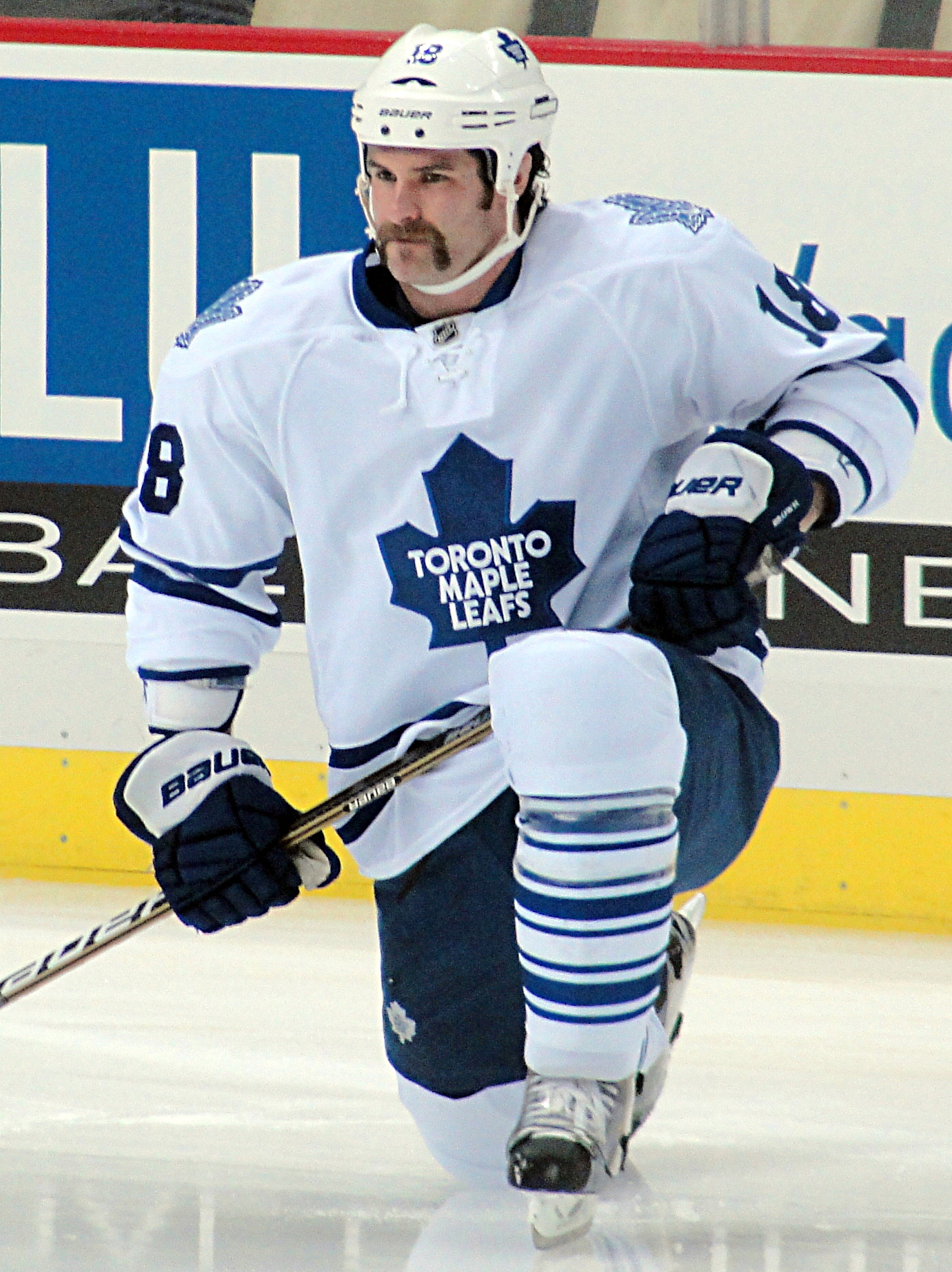
Mike Brown

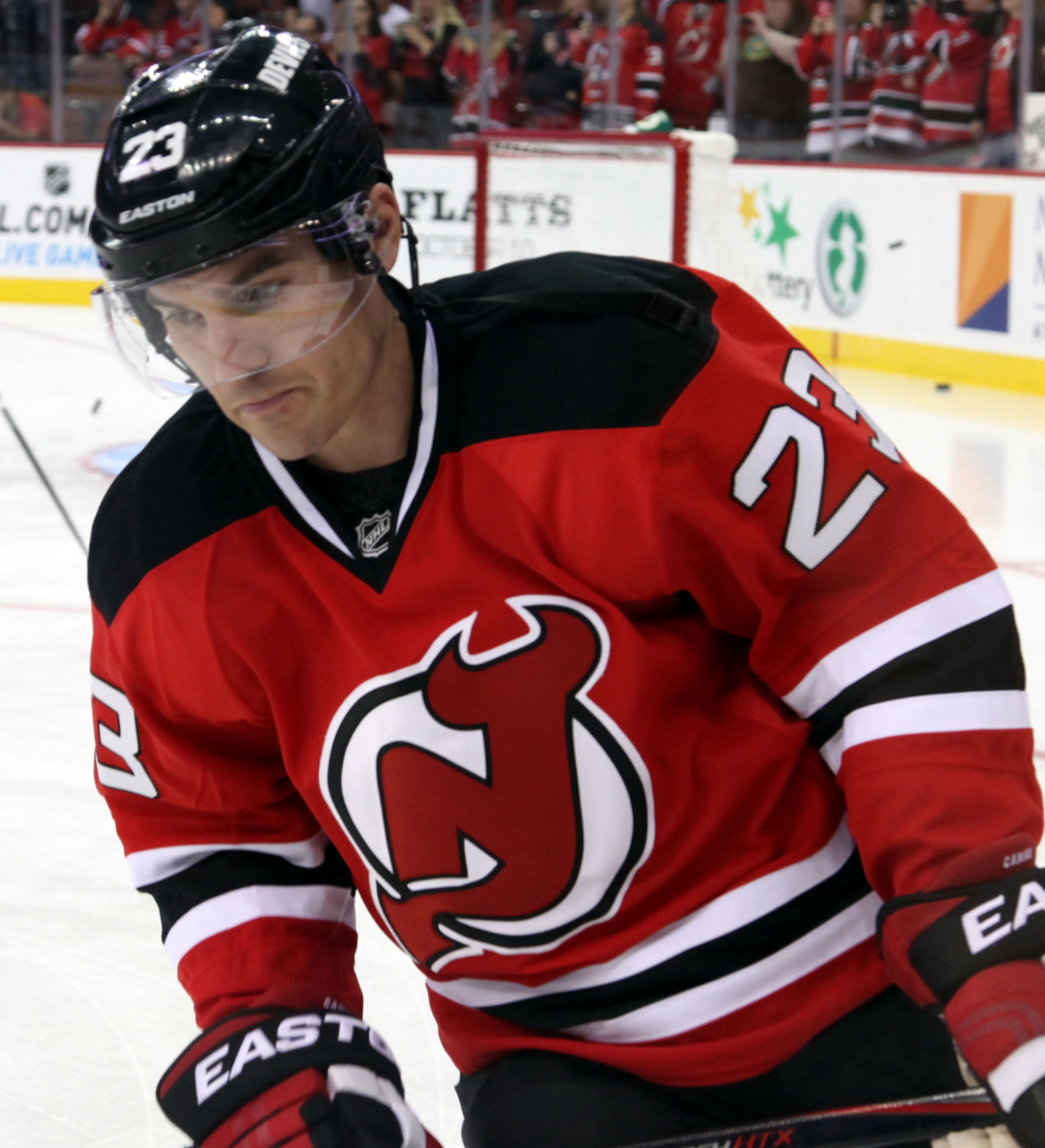
Mike Cammalleri

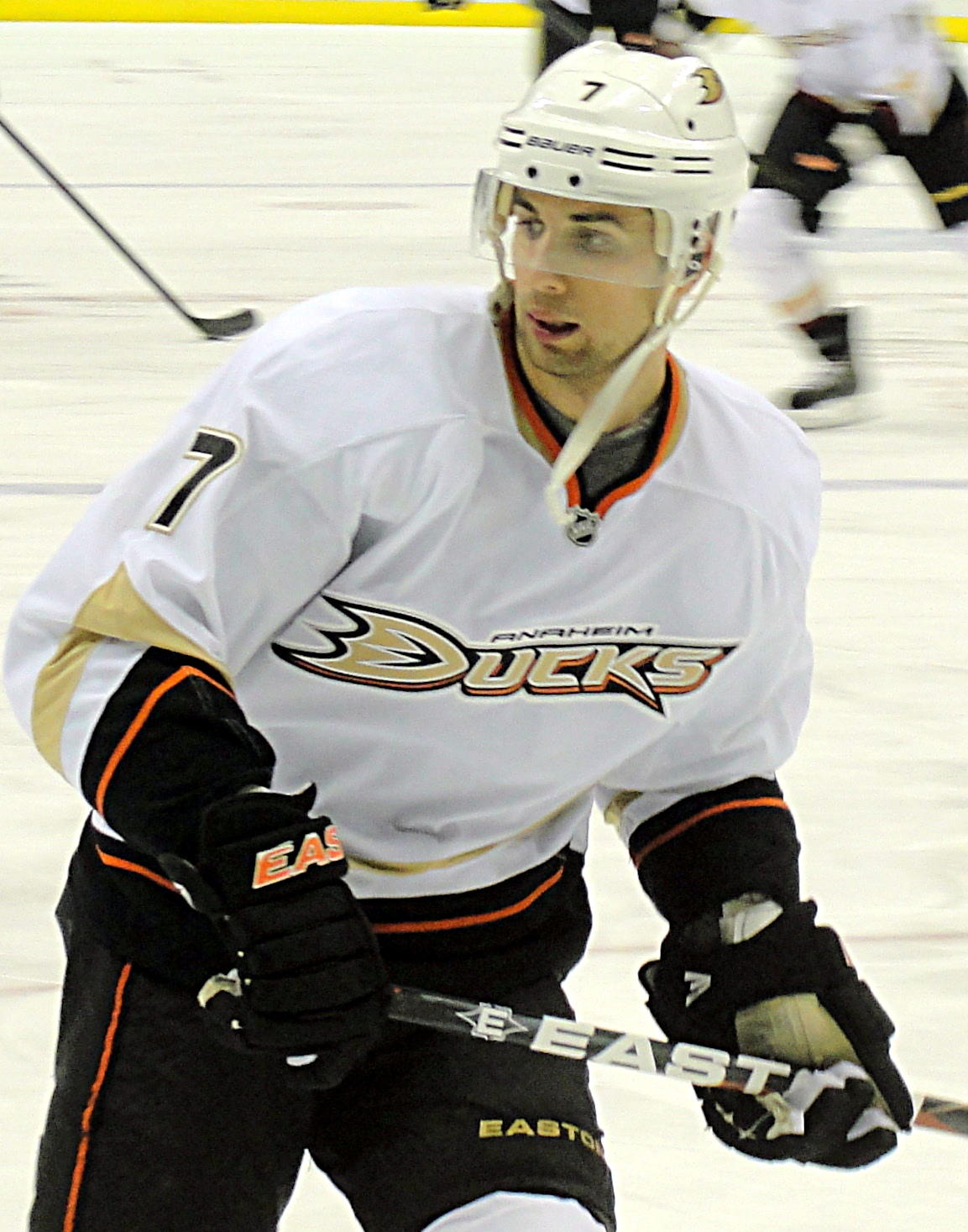
Andrew Cogliano

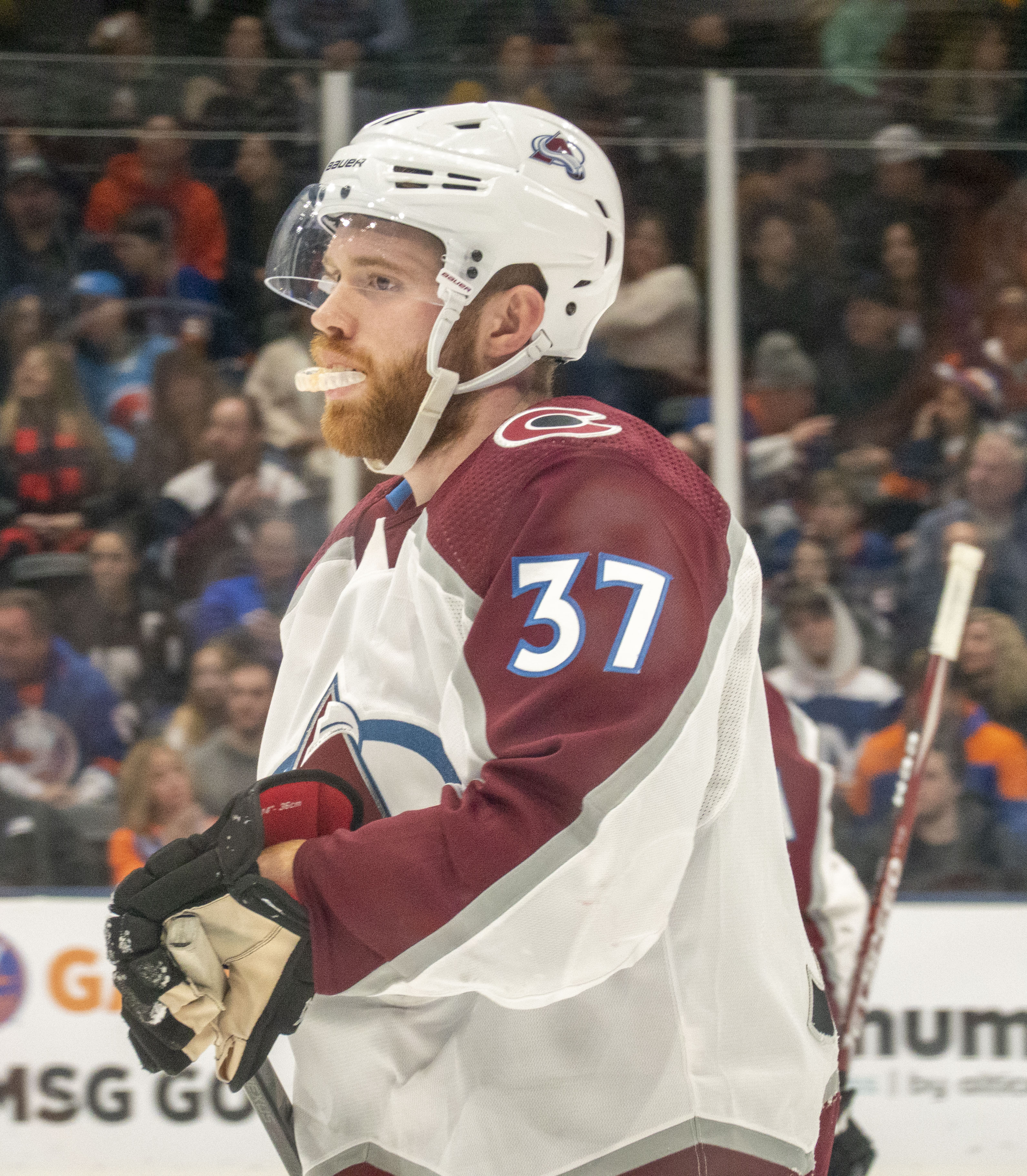
J. T. Compher

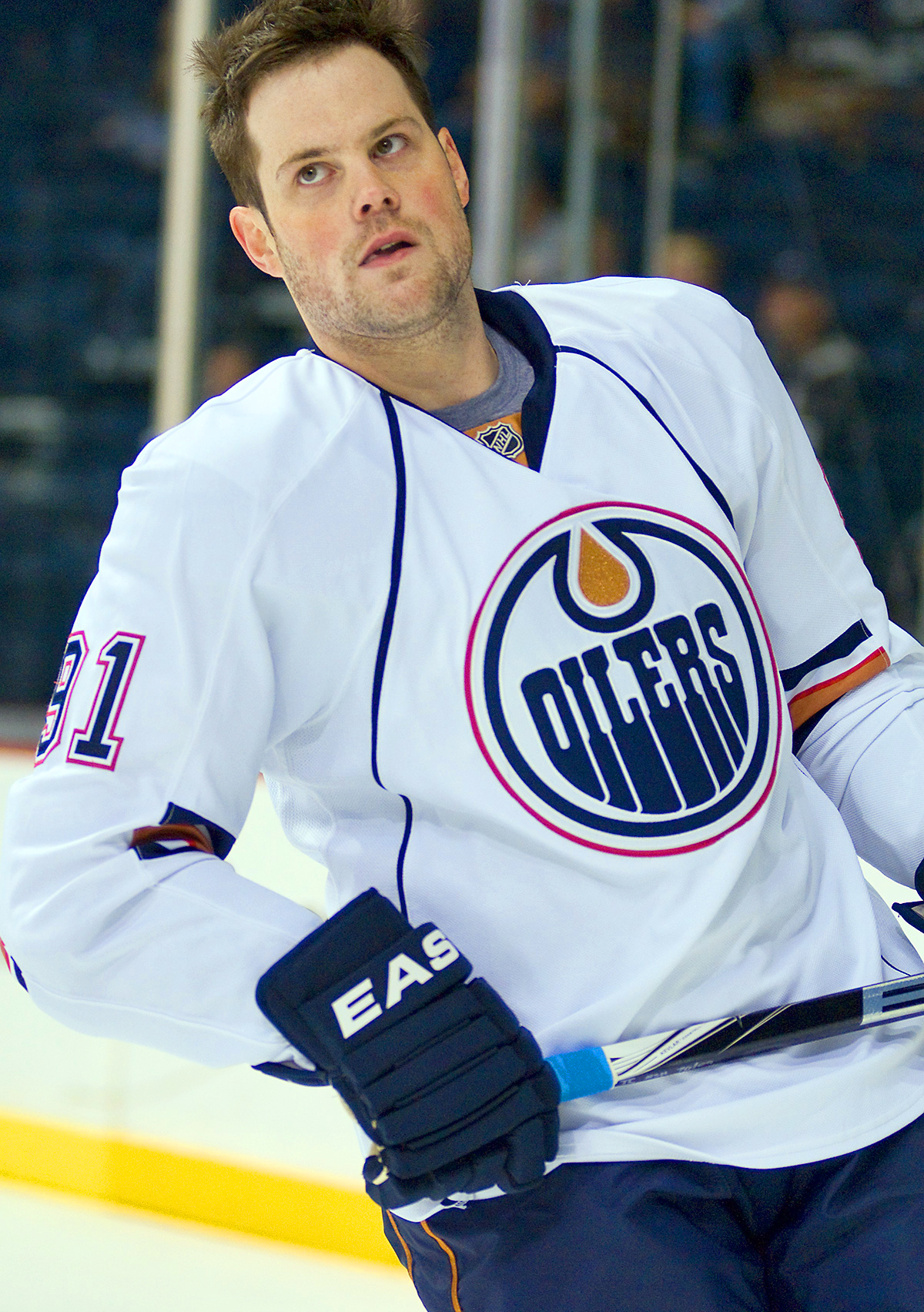
Mike Comrie

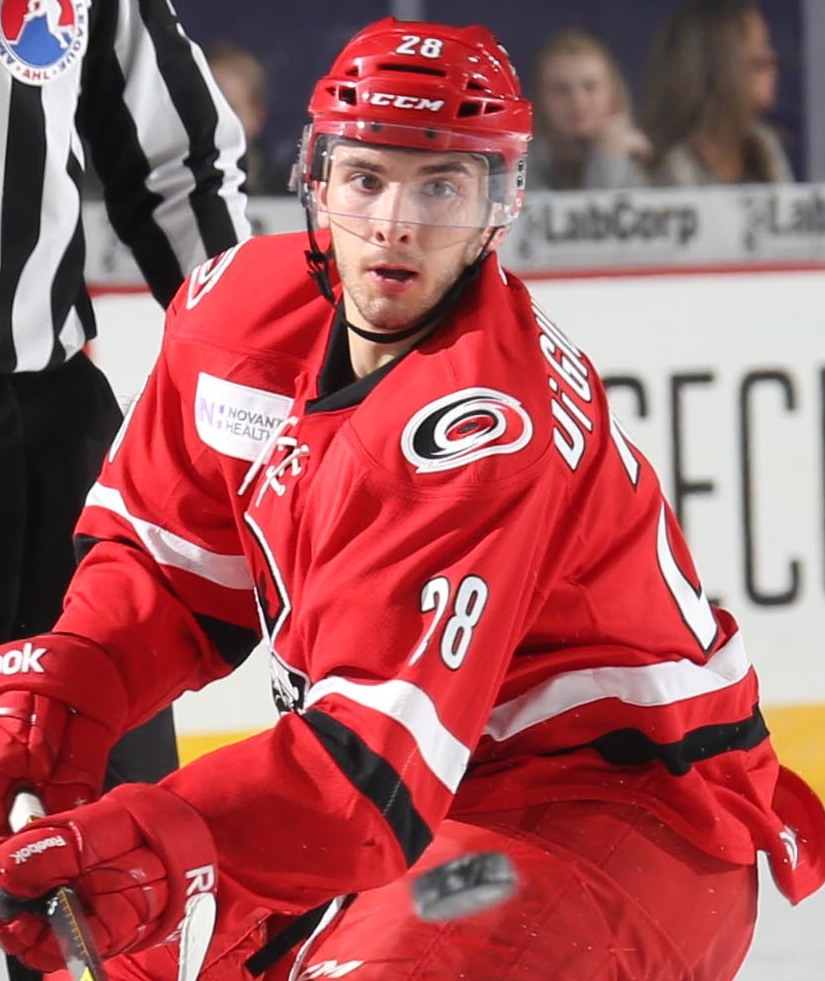
Phillip Di Giuseppe

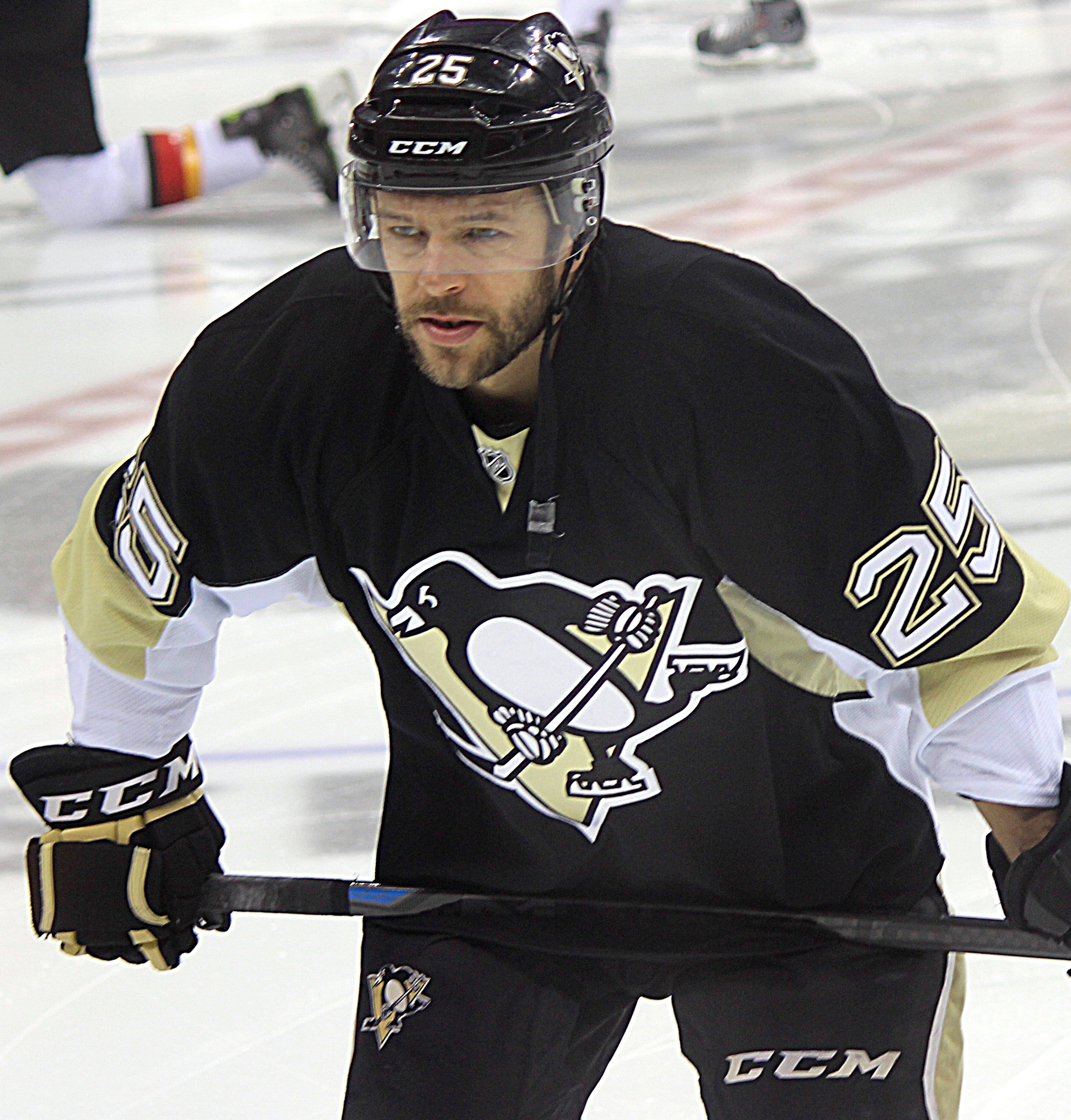
Andrew Ebbett

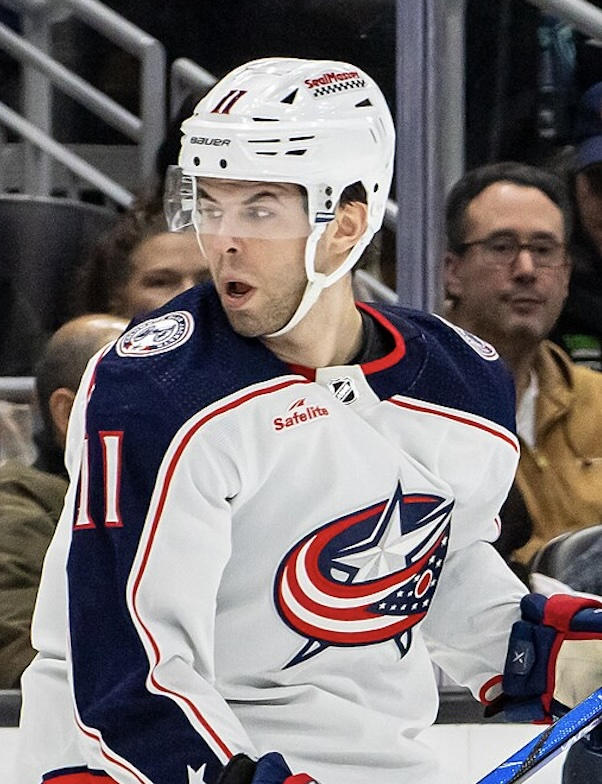
Adam Fantilli

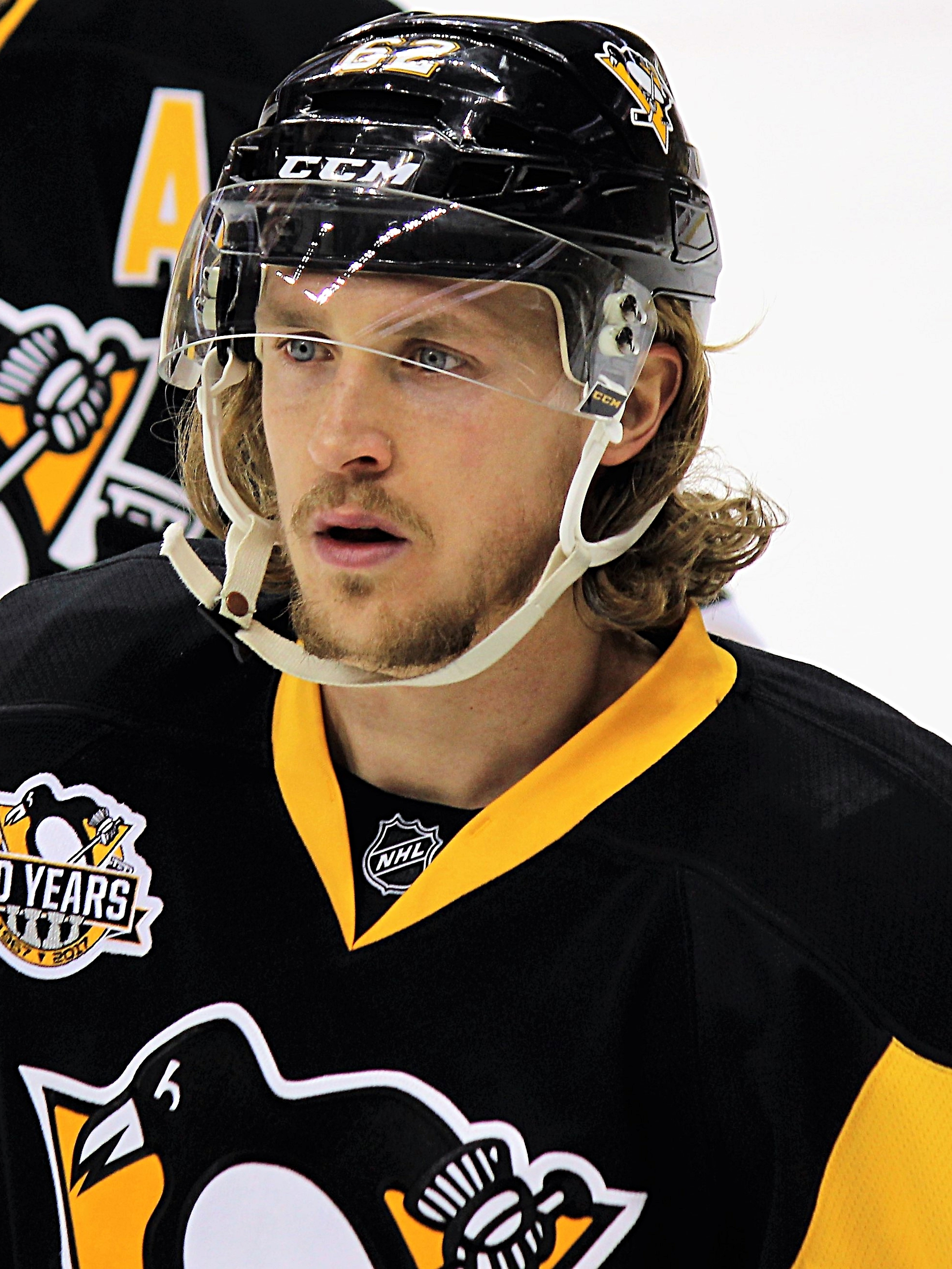
Carl Hagelin

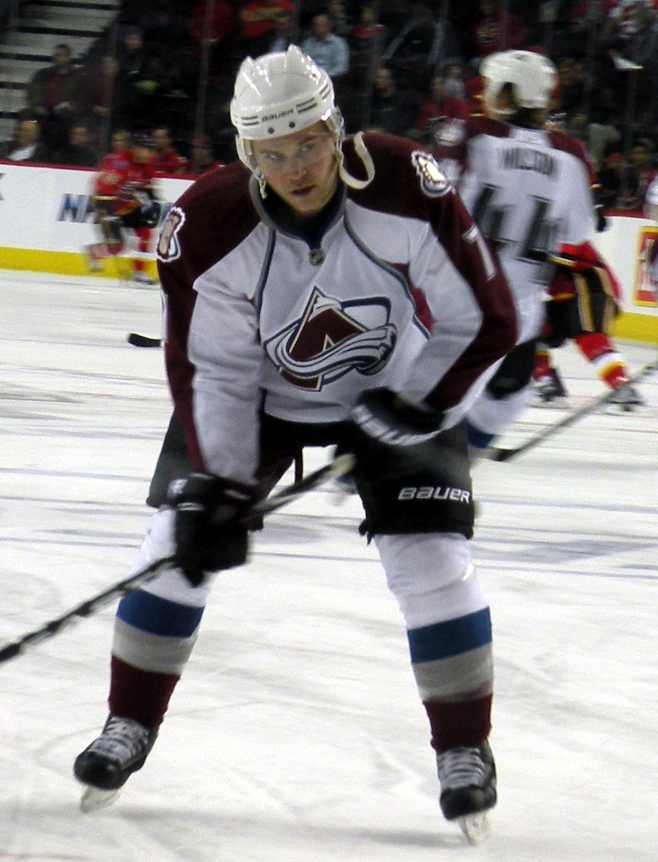
T. J. Hensick

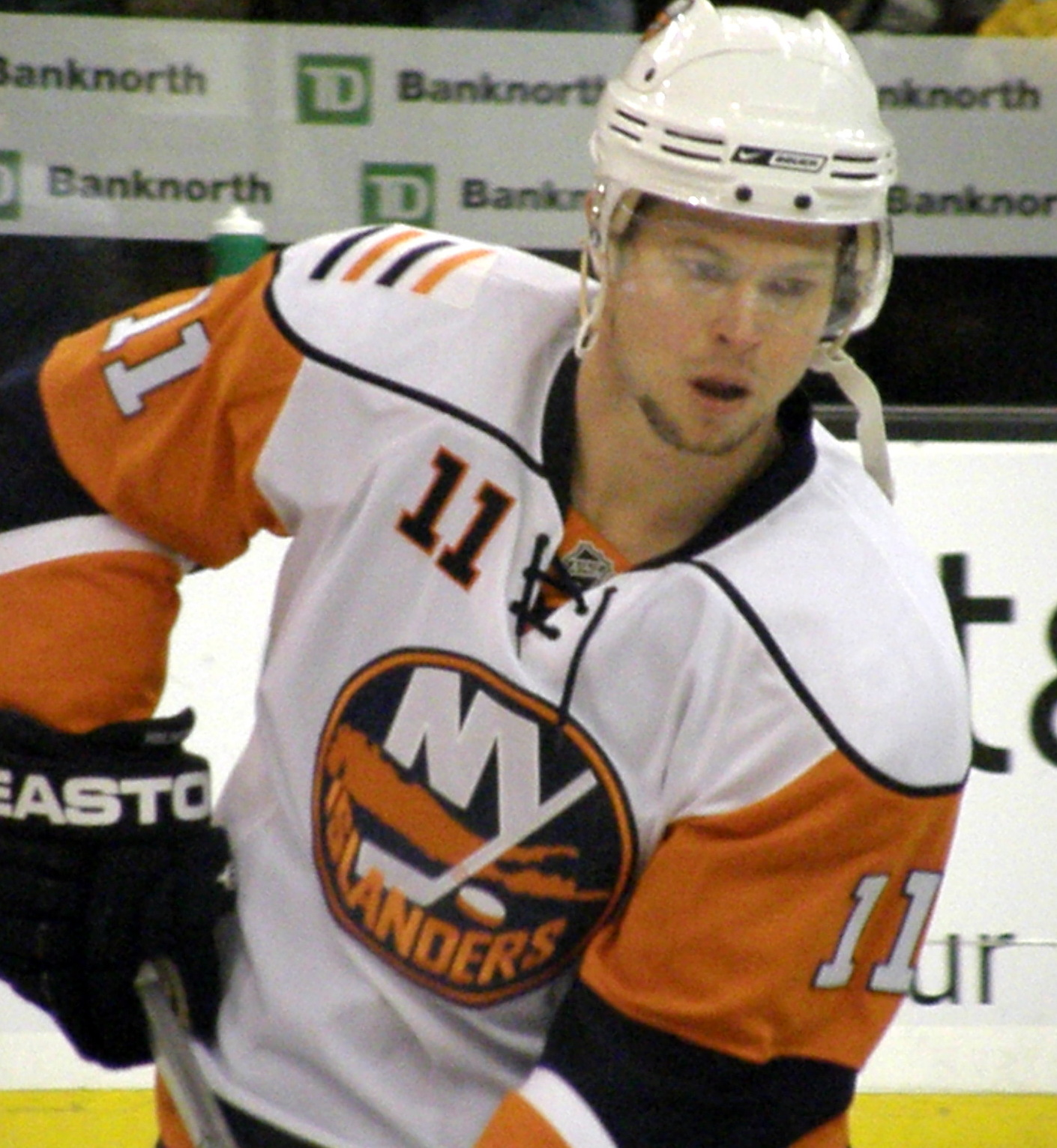
Andy Hilbert

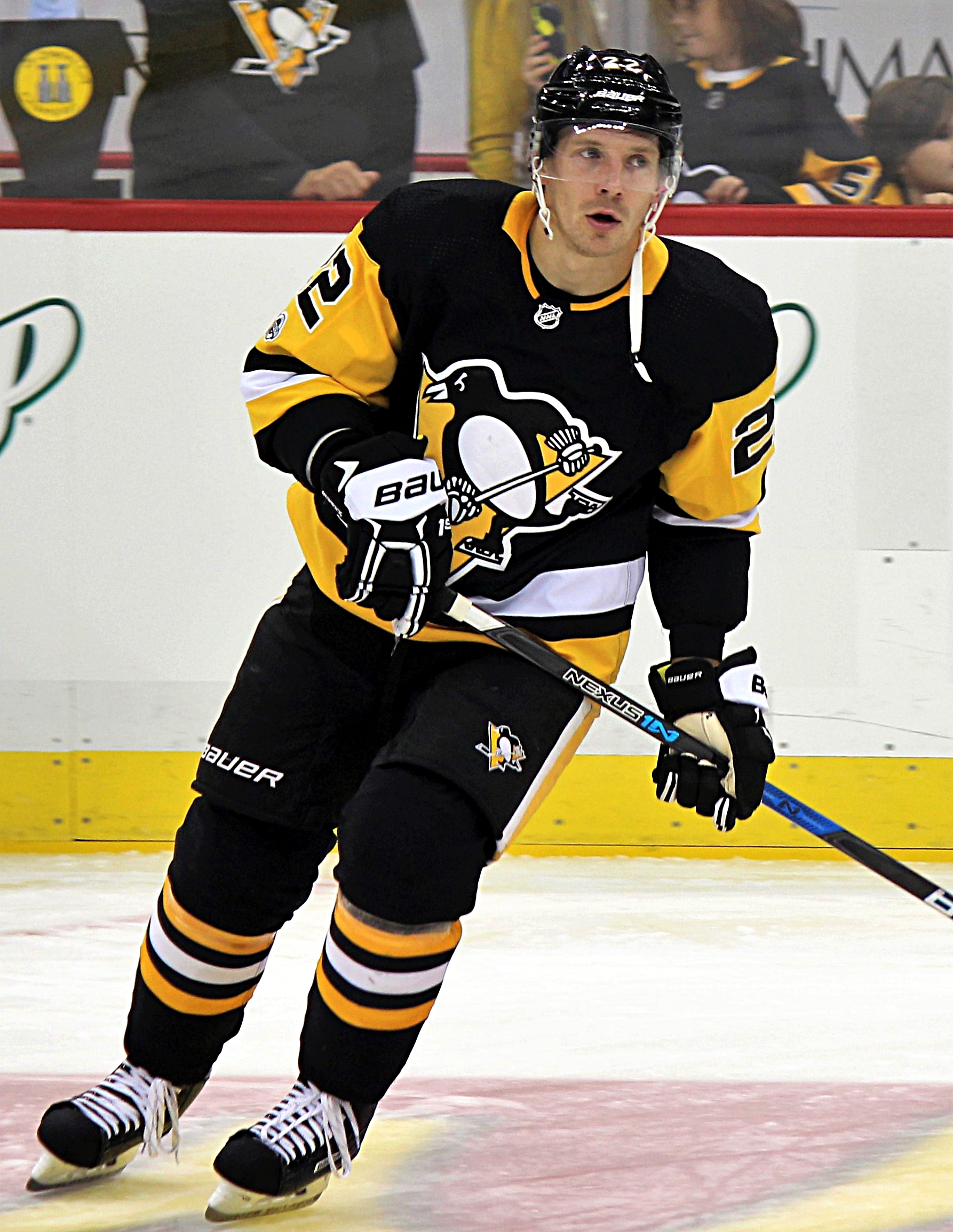
Matt Hunwick

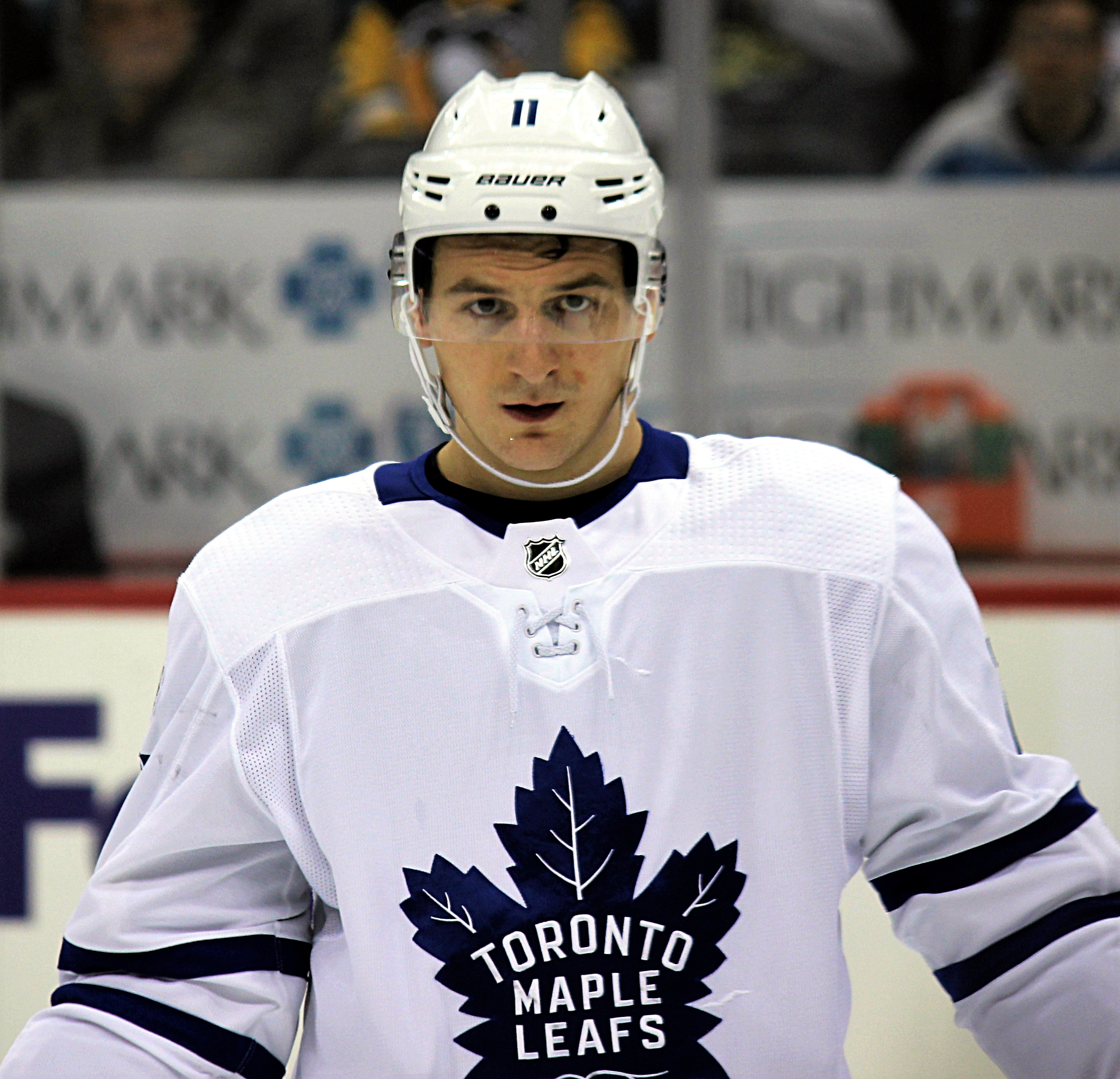
Zach Hyman

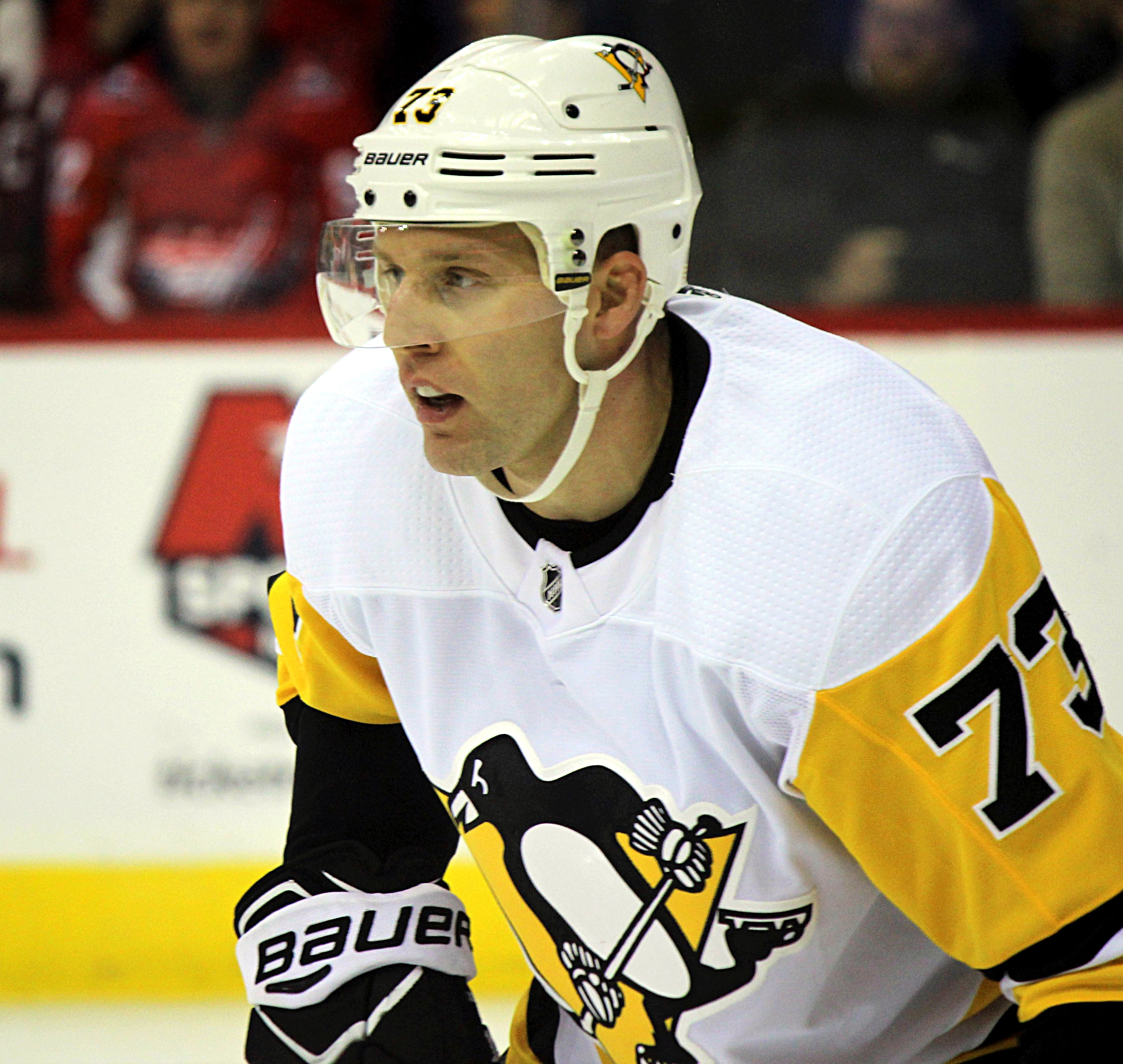
Jack Johnson

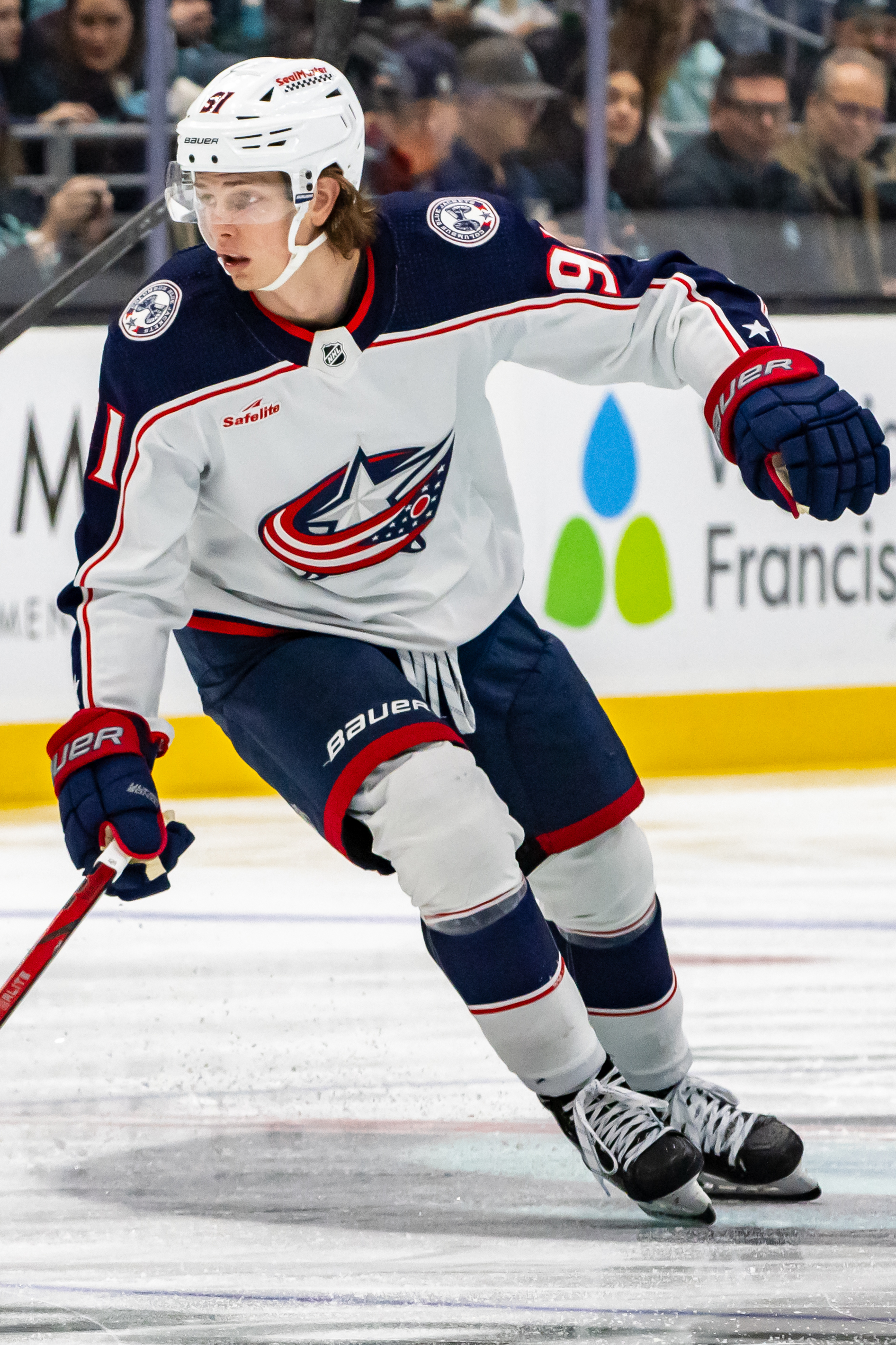
Kent Johnson

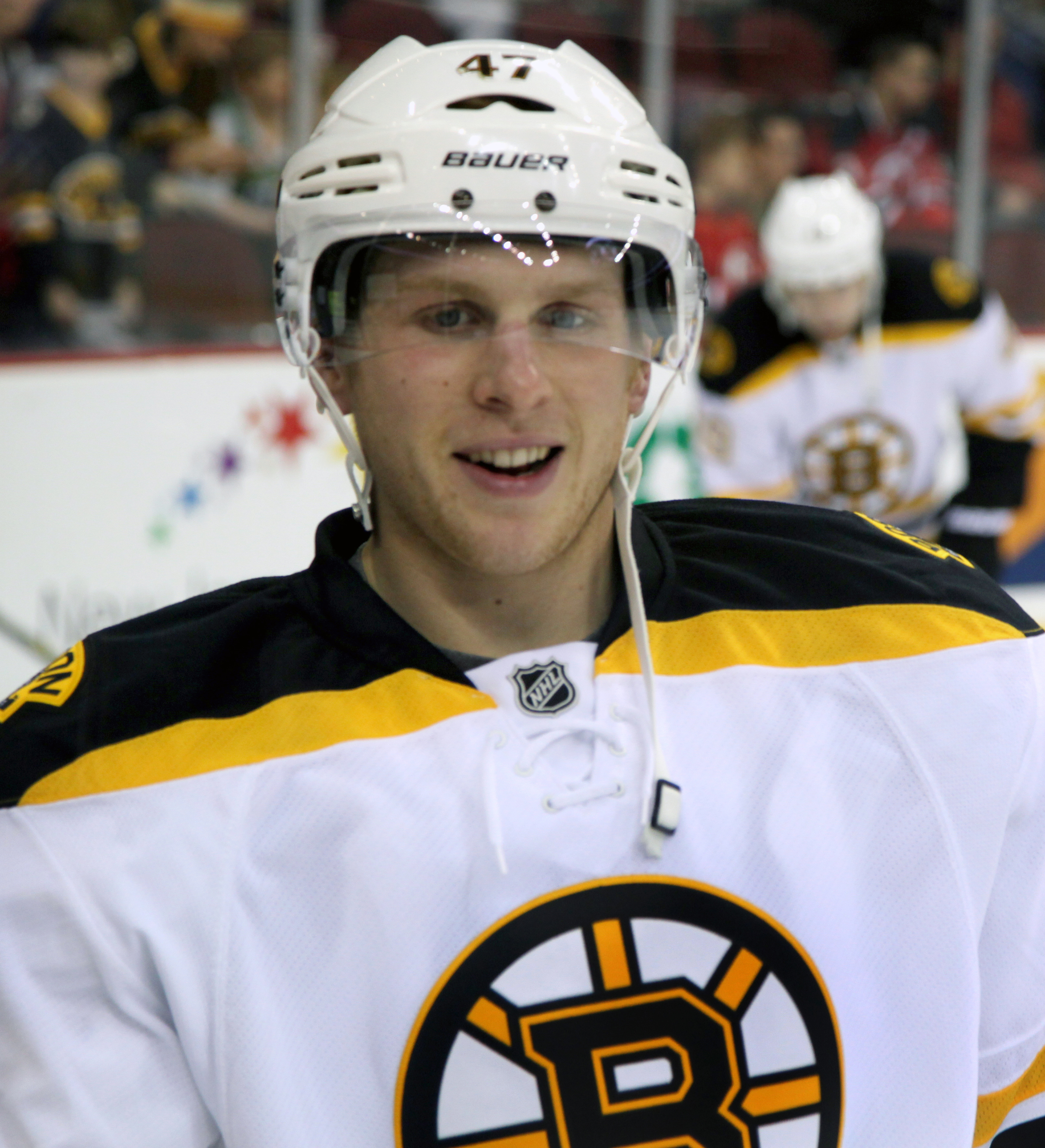
Steven Kampfer

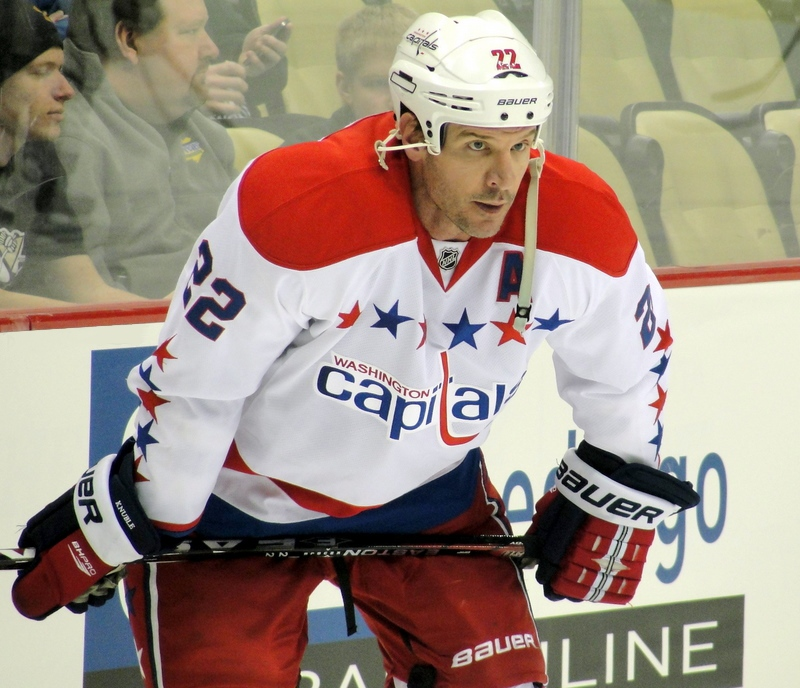
Mike Knuble

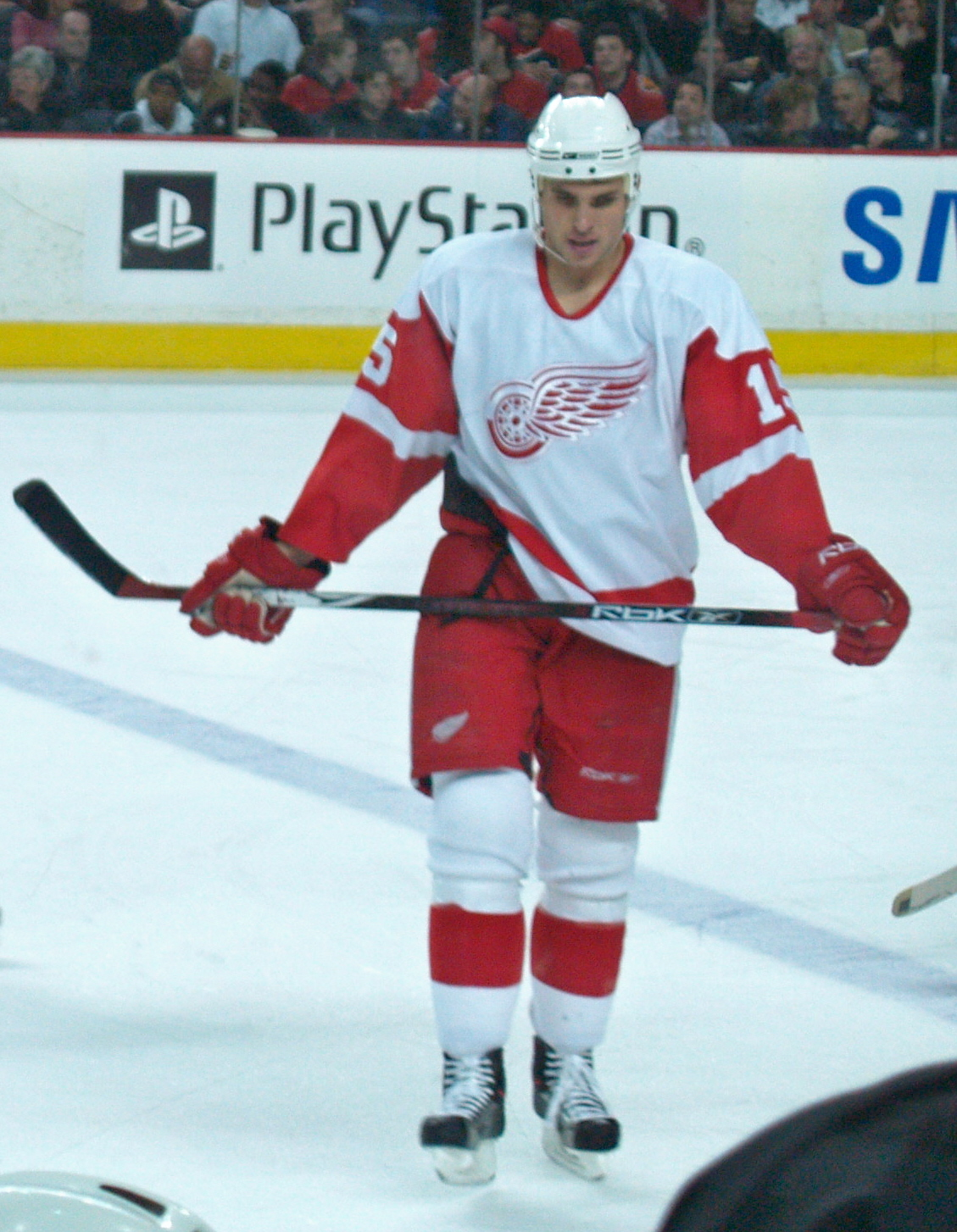
Josh Langfeld

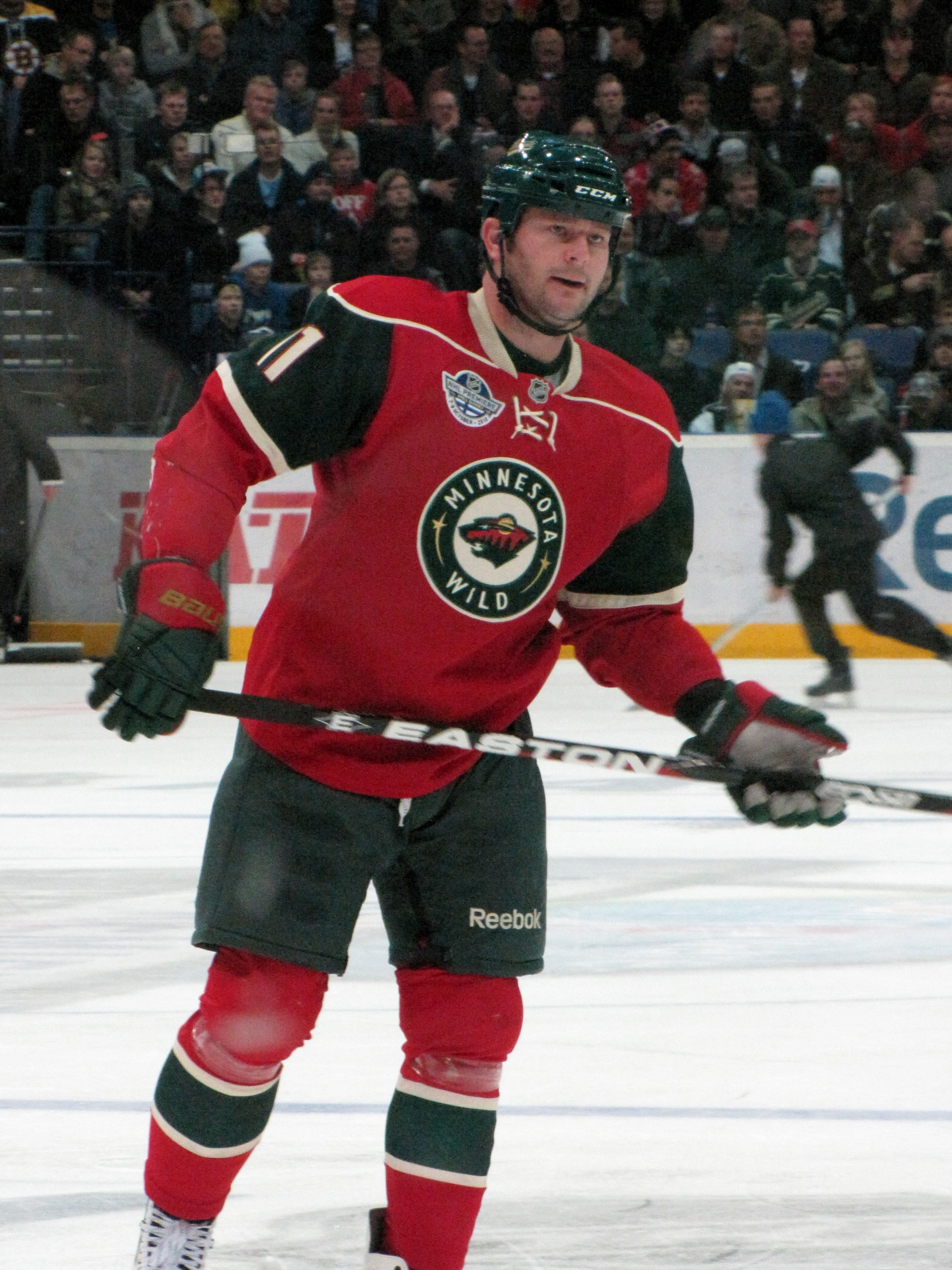
John Madden

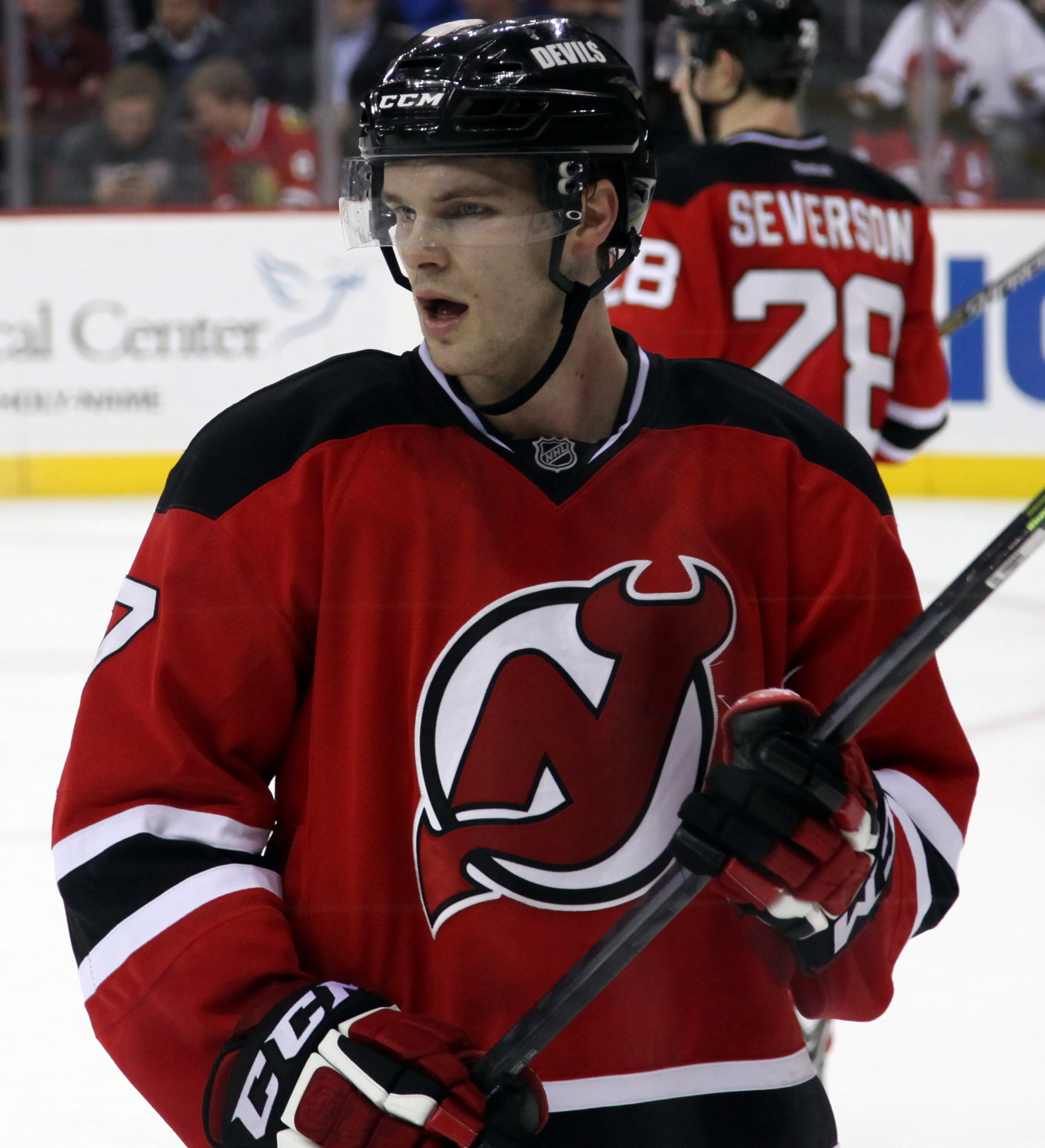
Jon Merrill

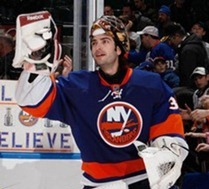
Al Montoya

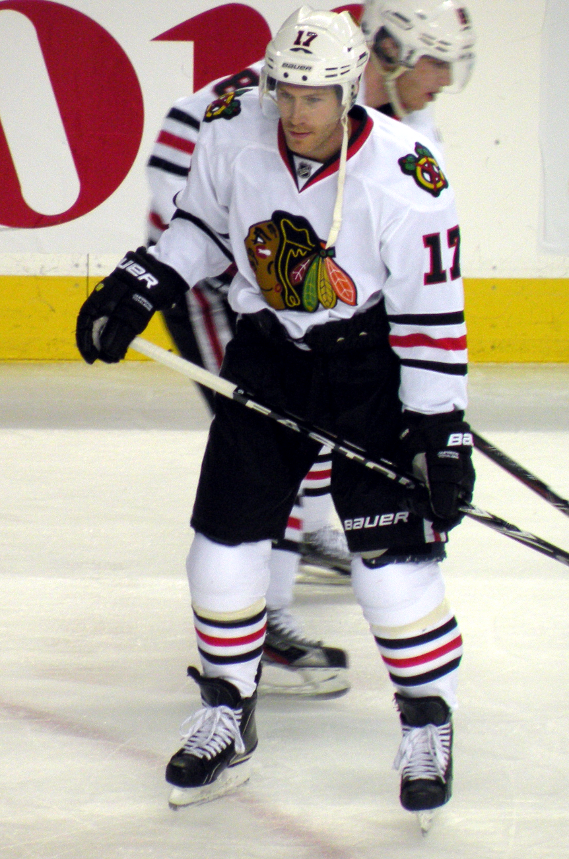
Brendan Morrison

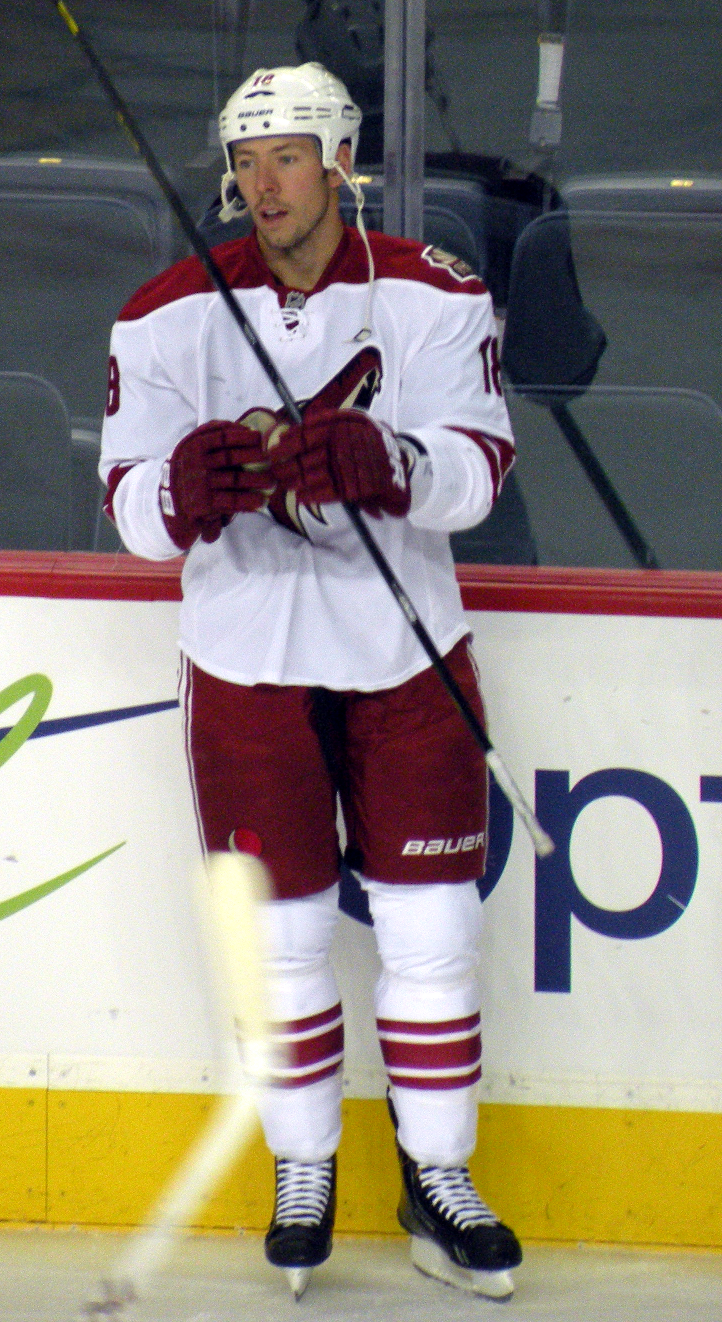
David Moss

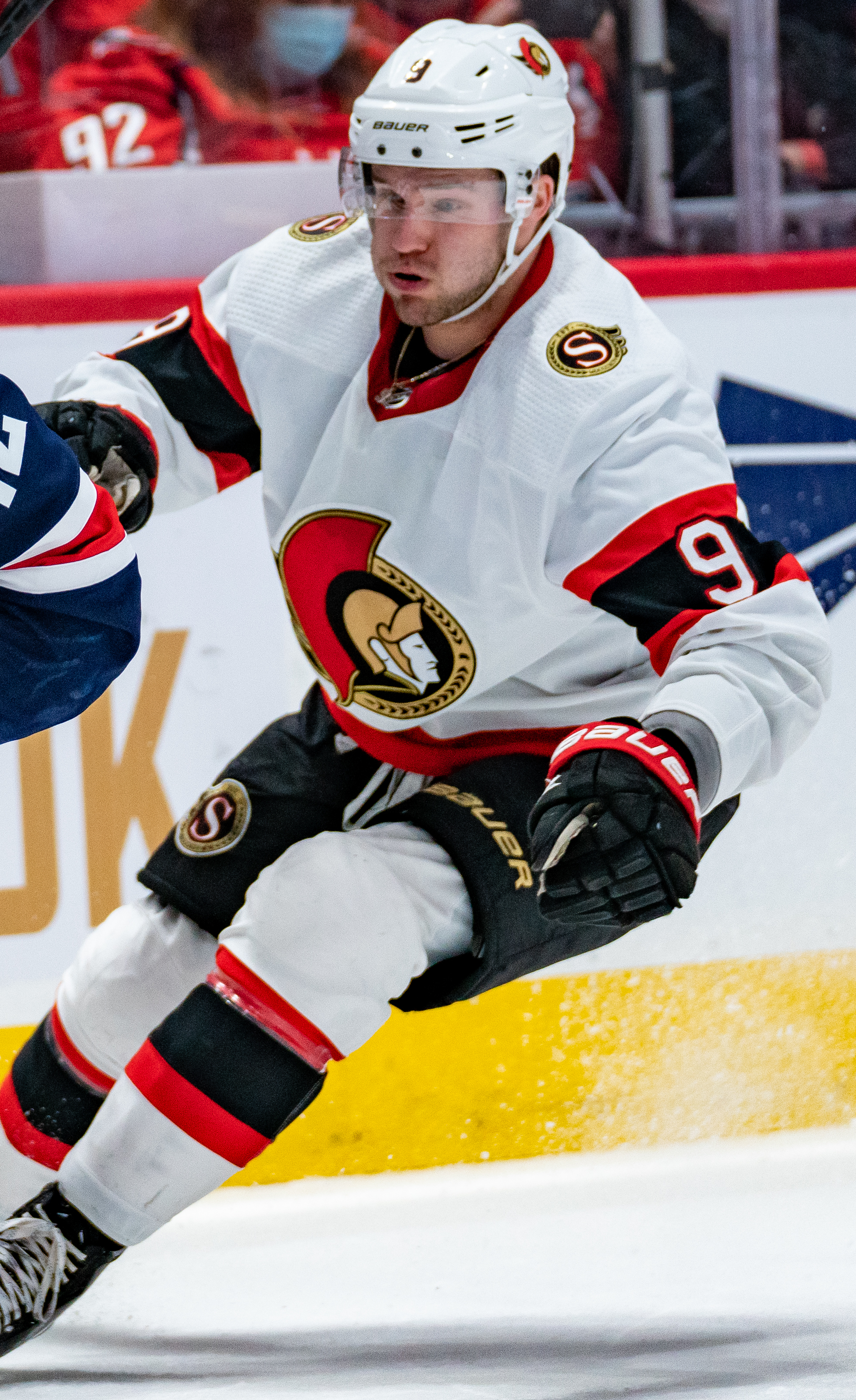
Josh Norris

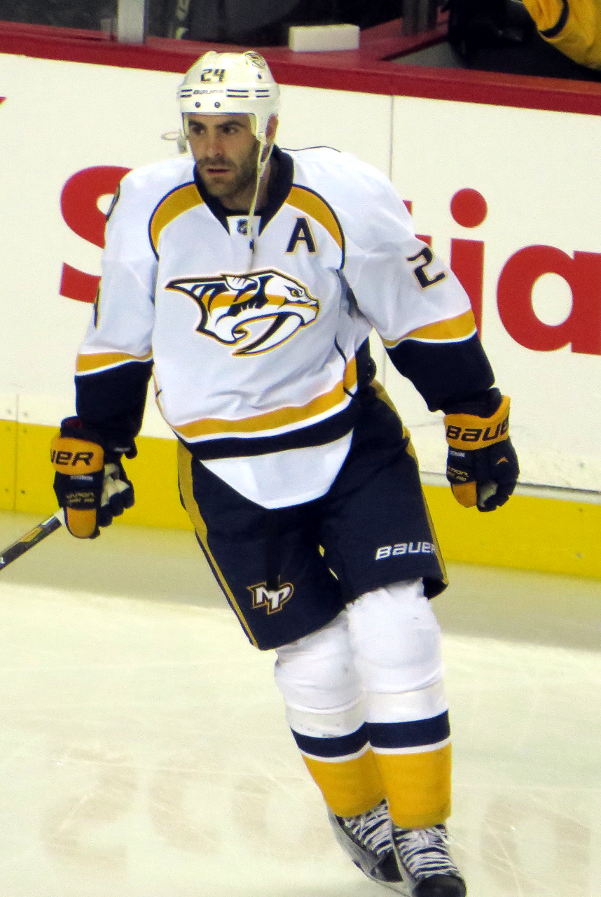
Eric Nystrom

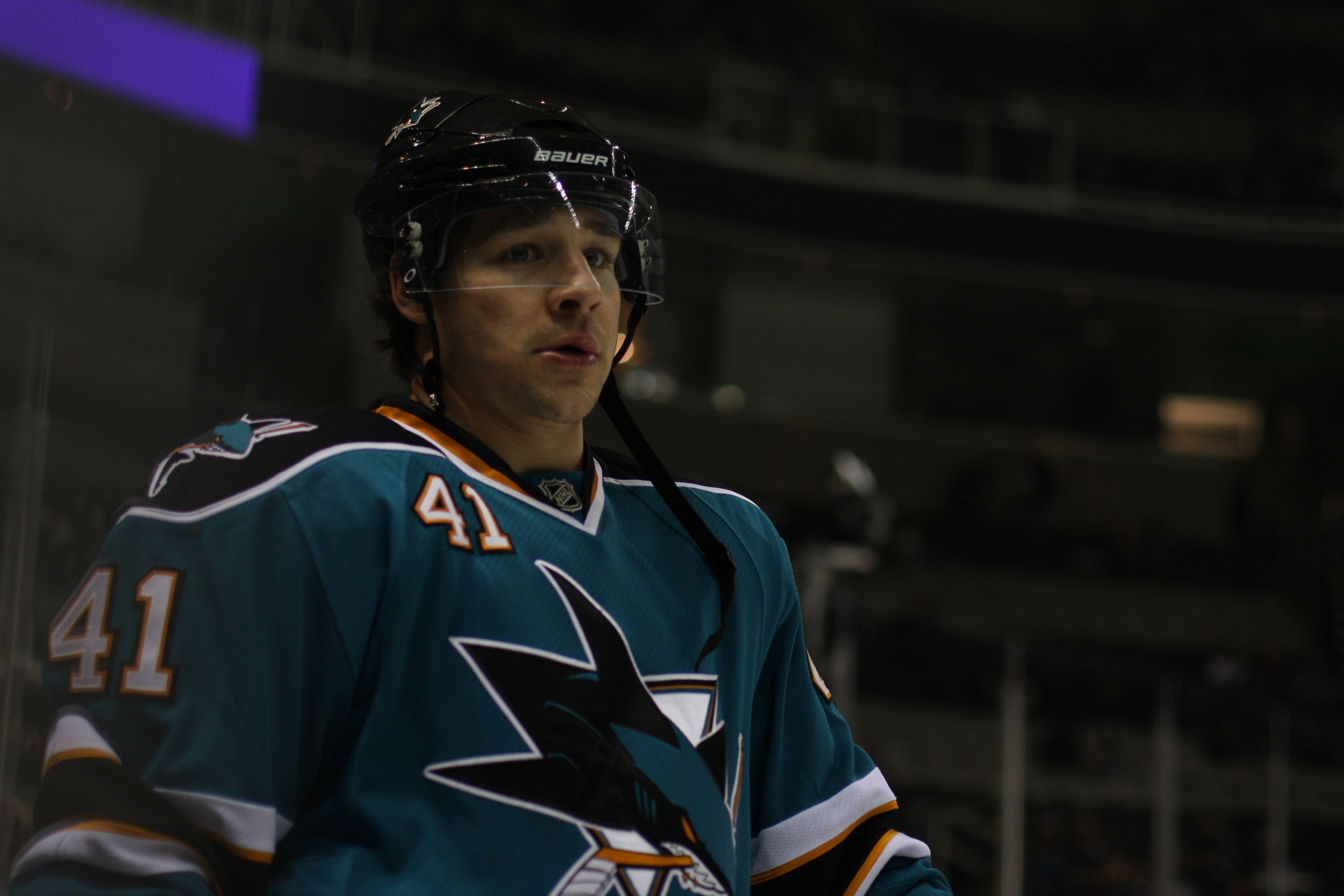
Jed Ortmeyer

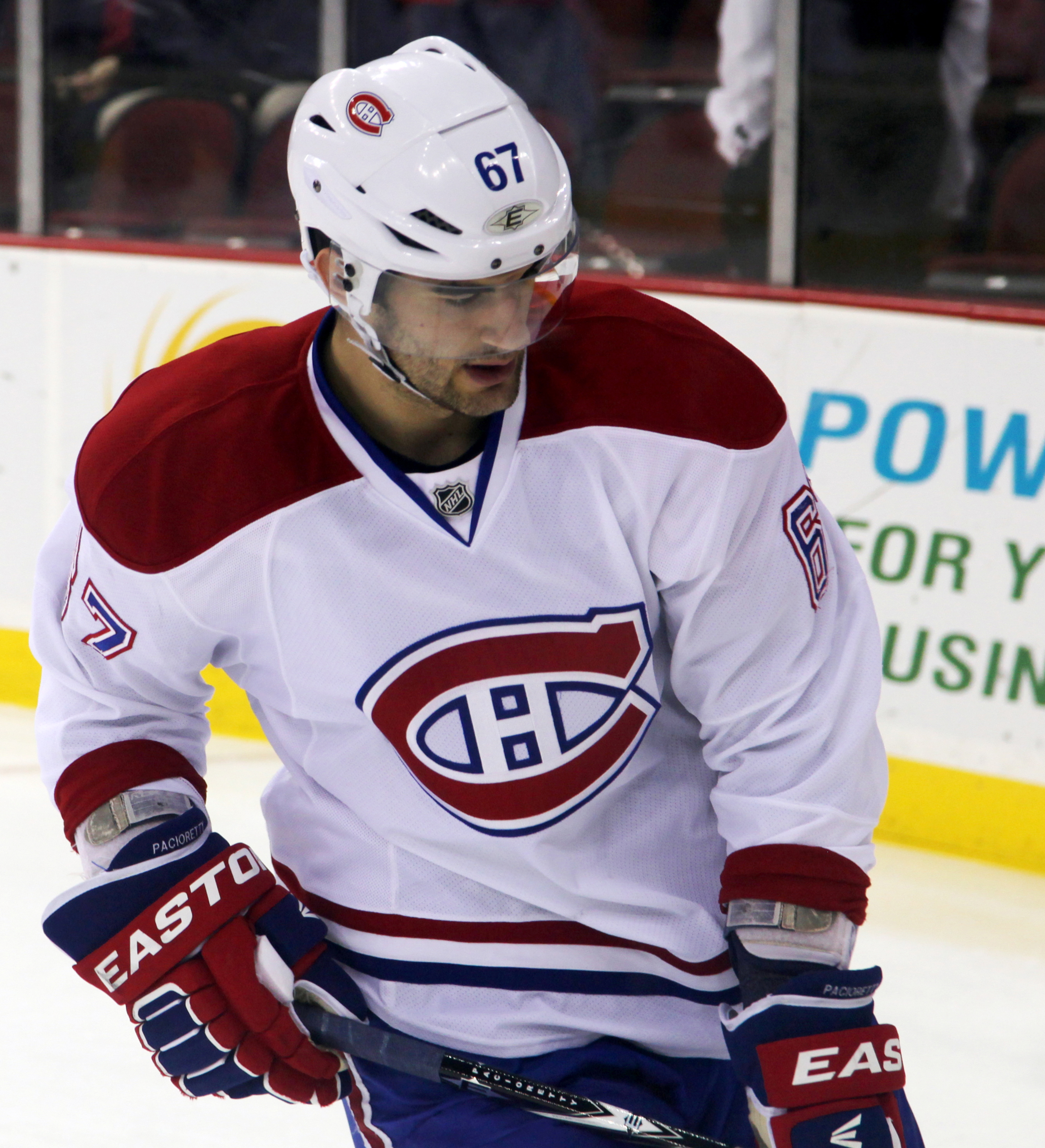
Max Pacioretty

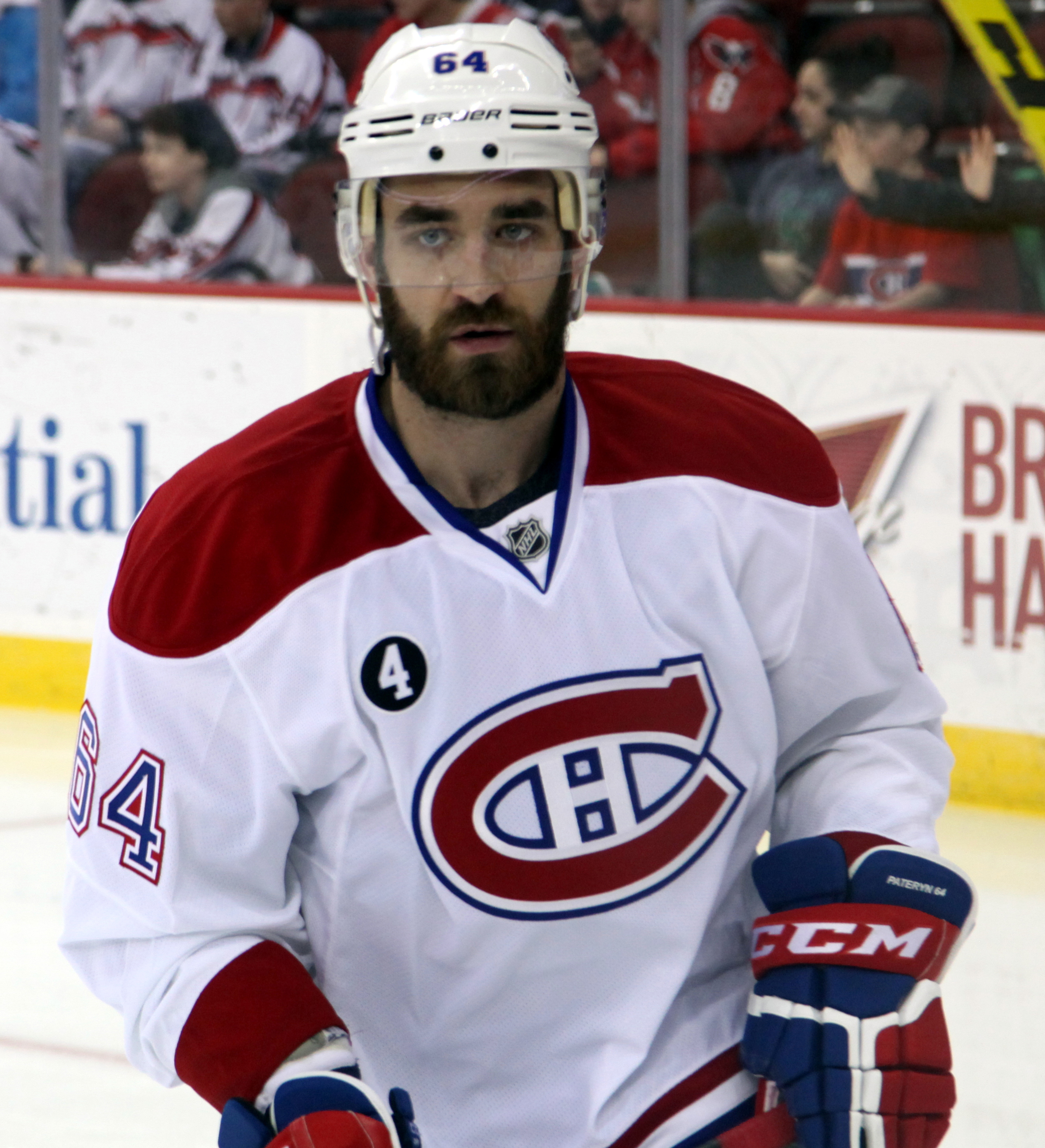
Greg Pateryn

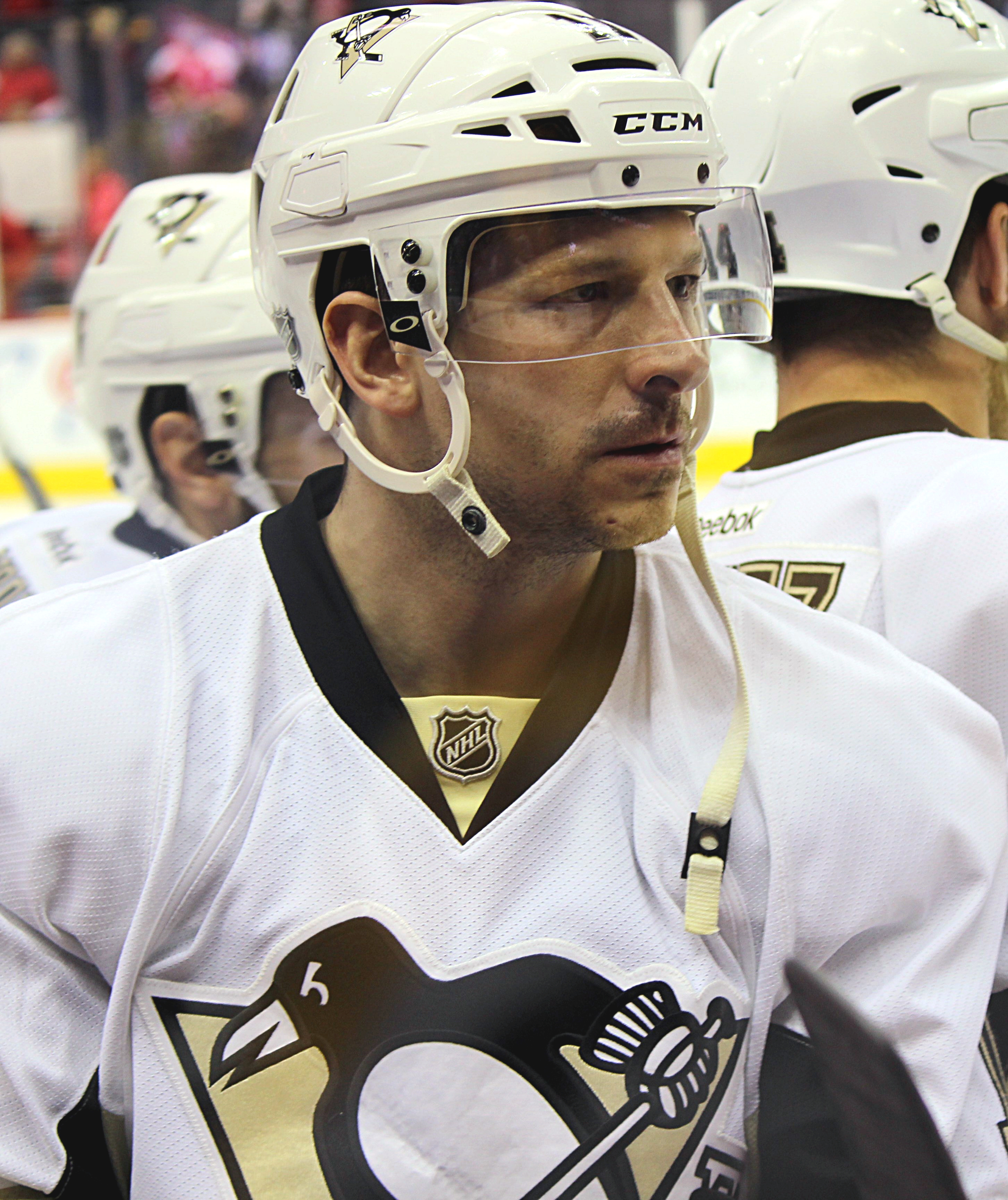
Kevin Porter

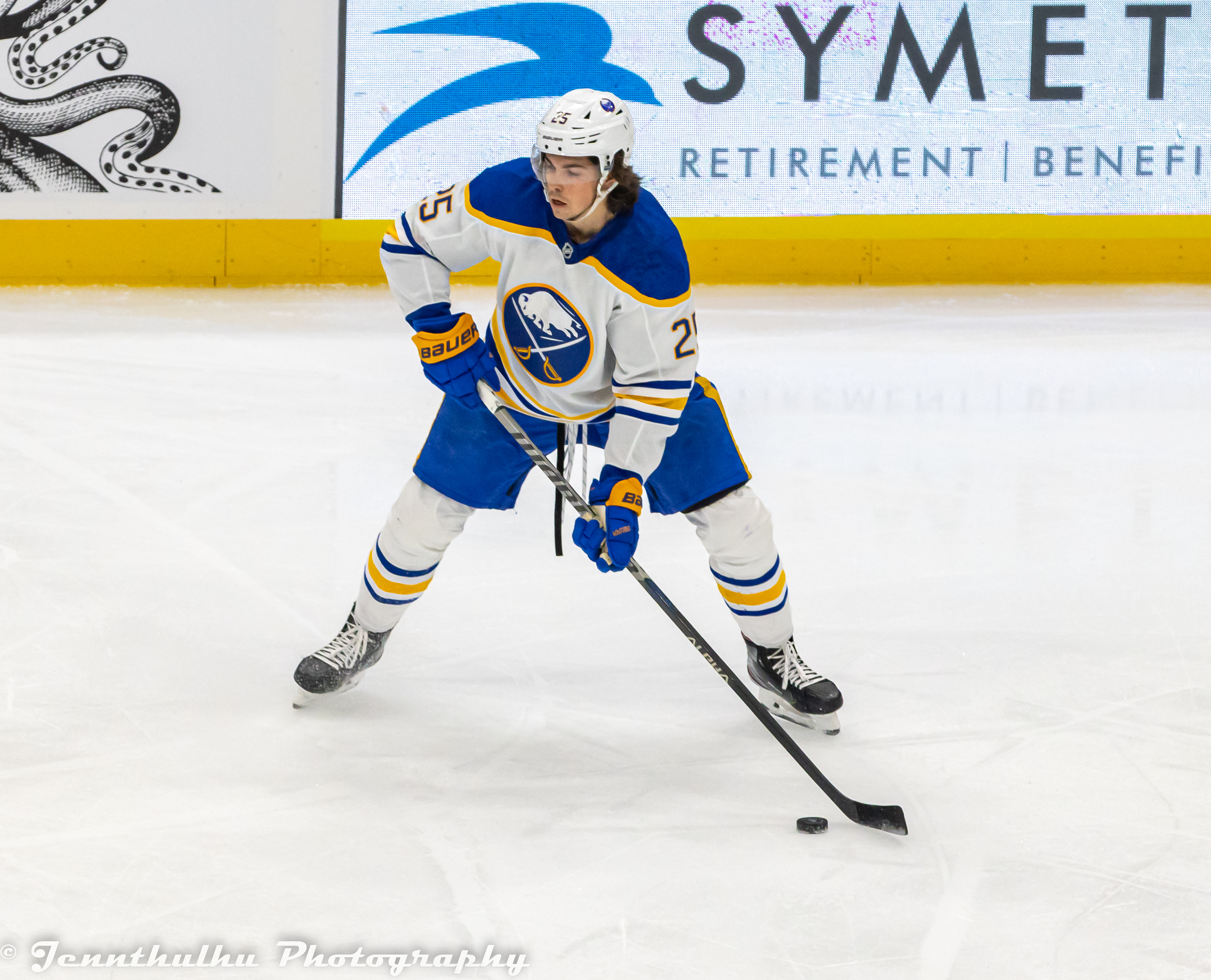
Owen Power

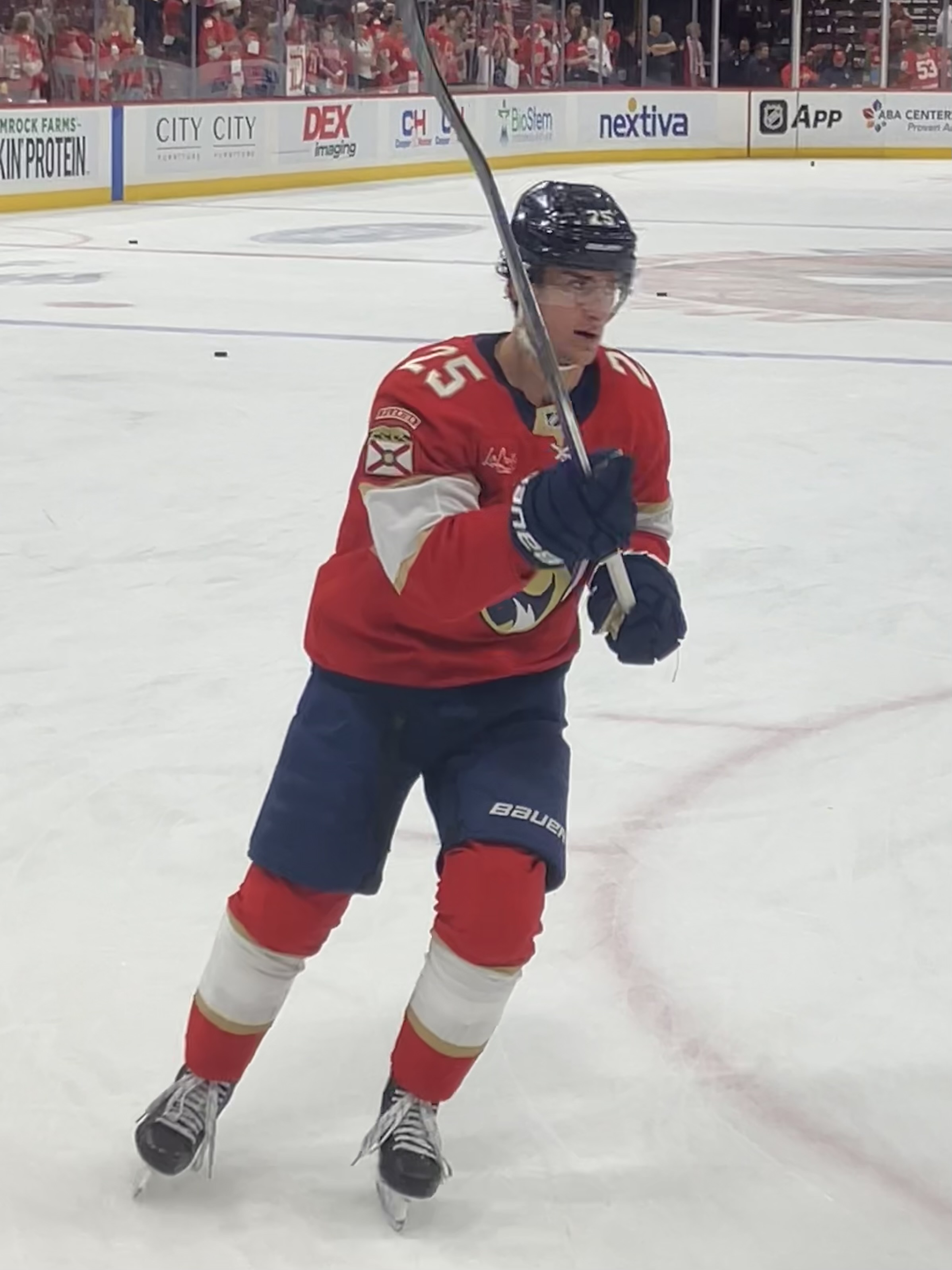
Mackie Samoskevich

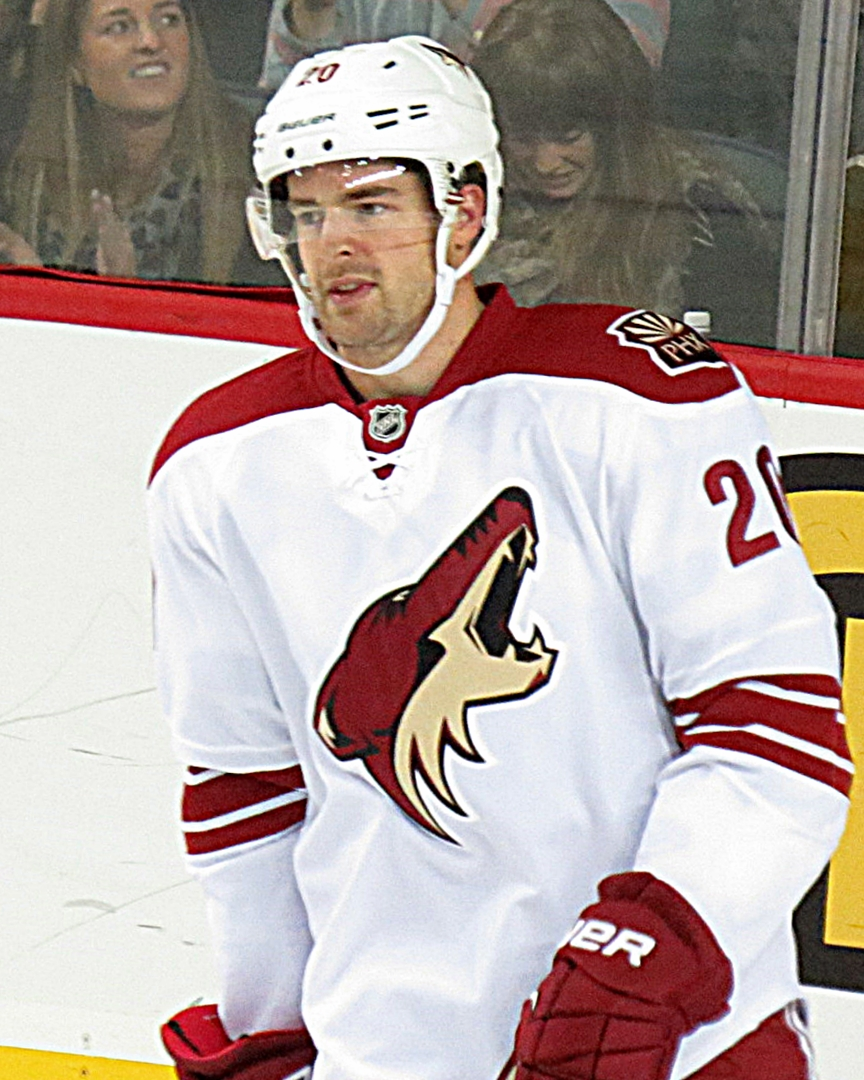
Chris Summers

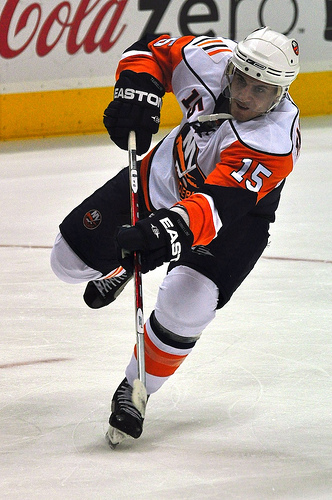
Jeff Tambellini

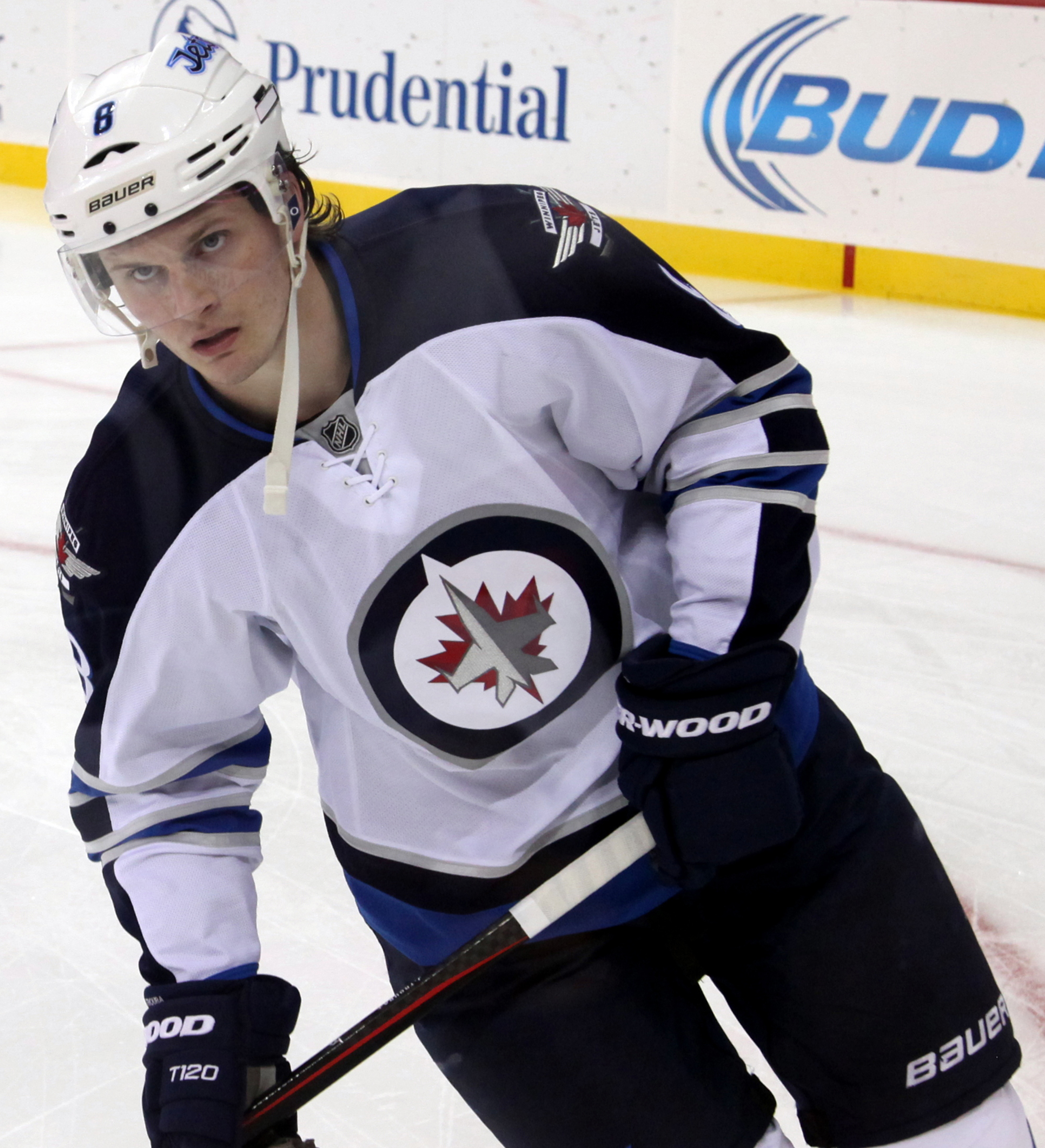
Jacob Trouba

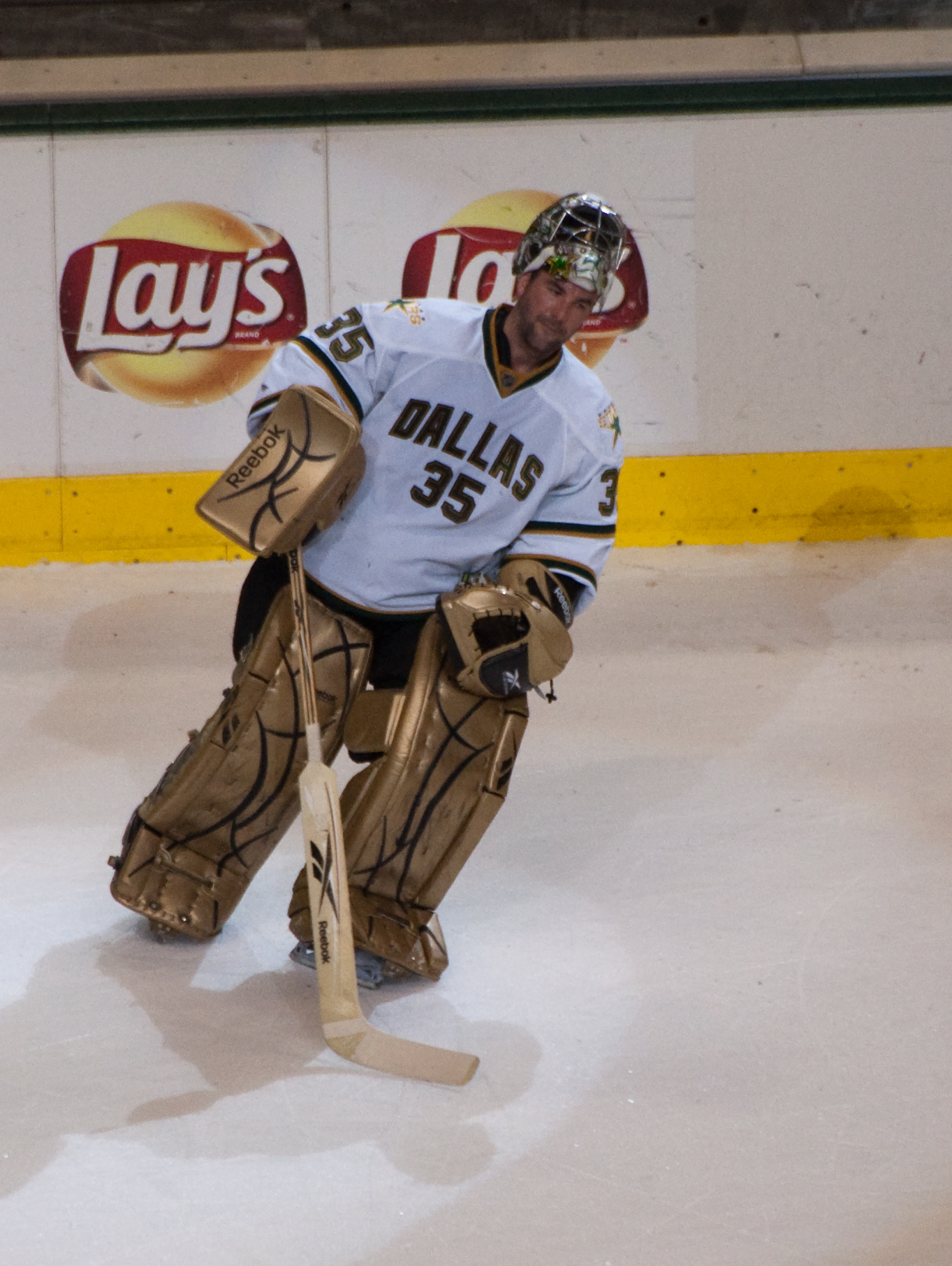
Marty Turco

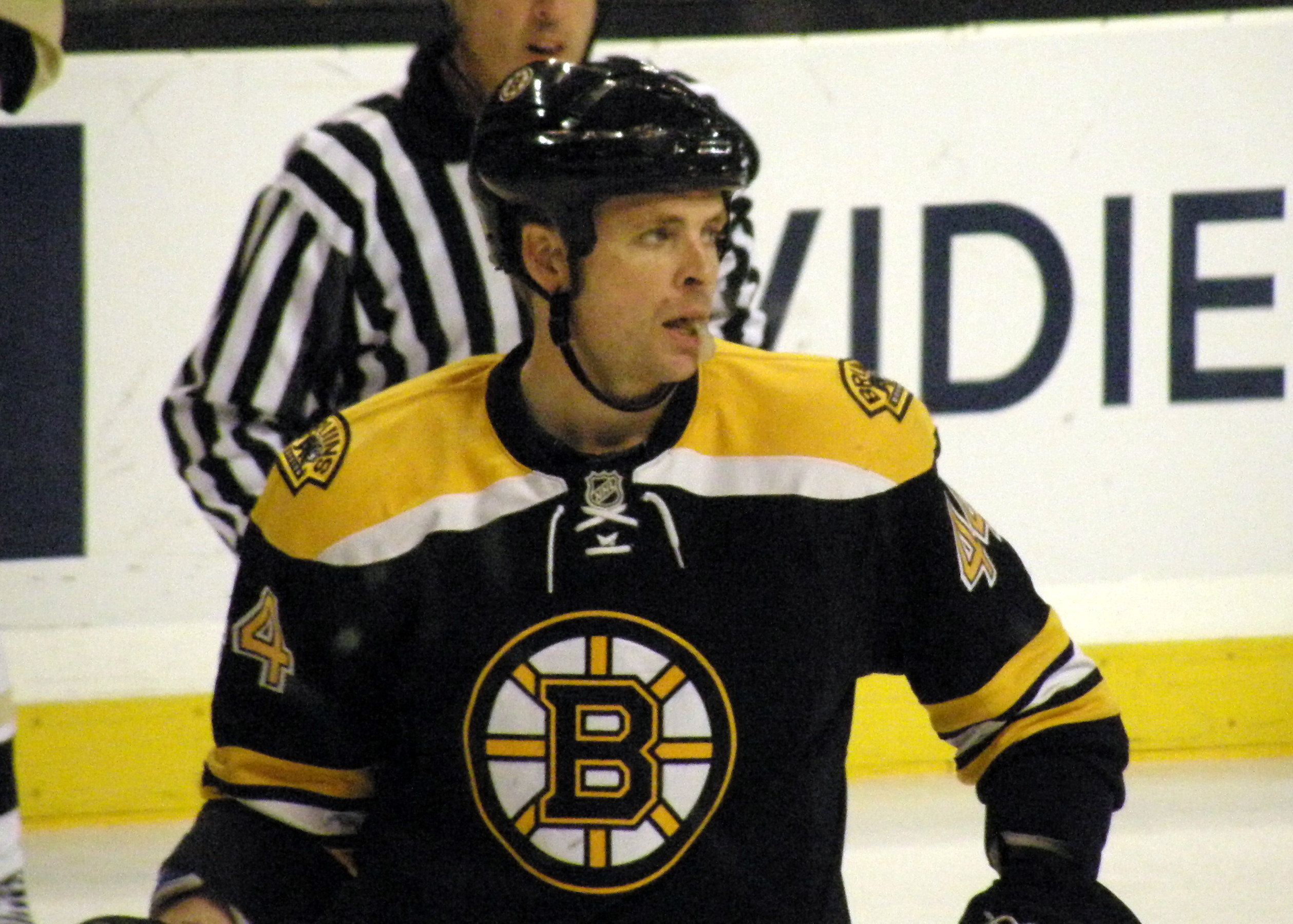
Aaron Ward

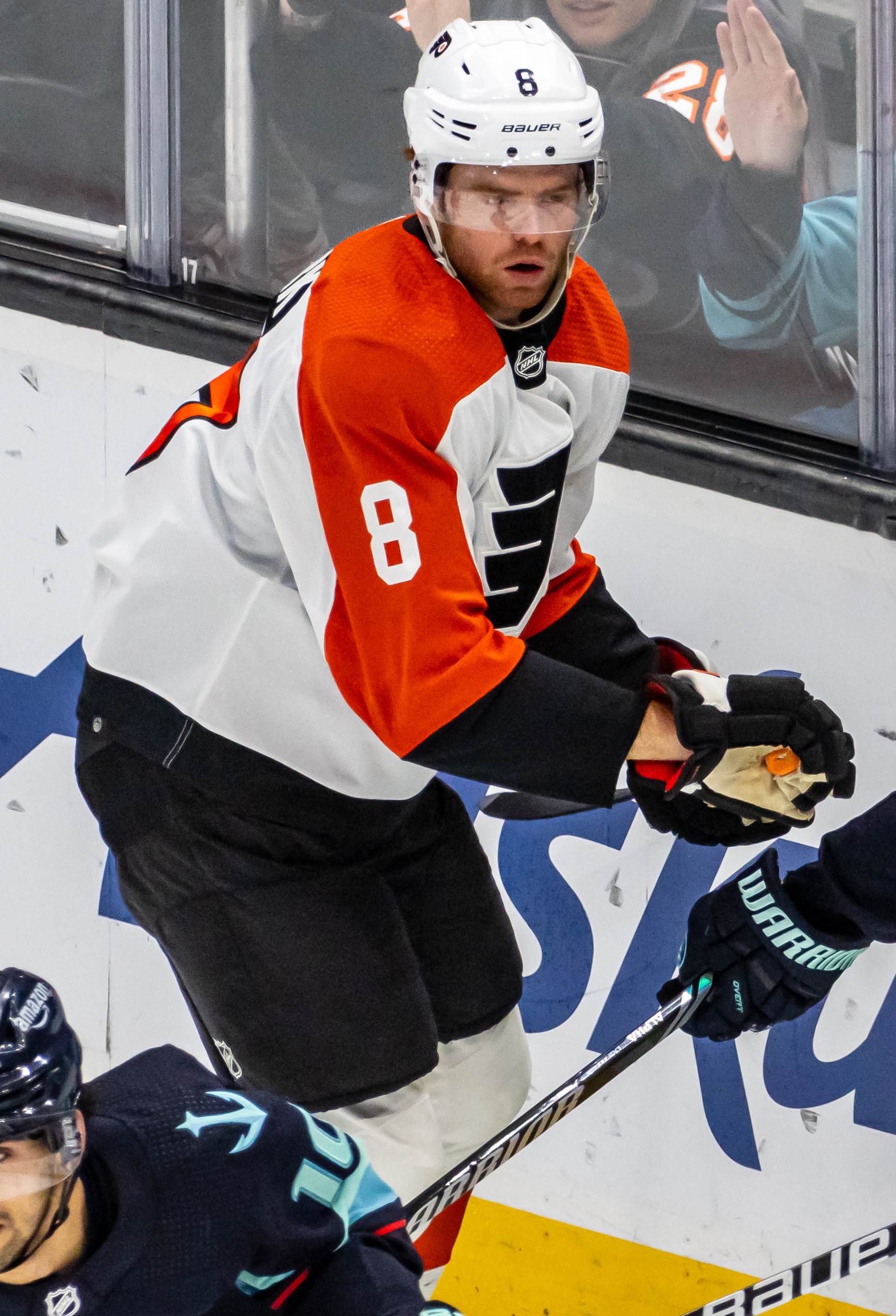
Cameron York
