= 2002 CCHA men's ice hockey tournament =

2002 CCHA Men's ice hockey tournament
- Dates: March 8–17, 2002
- Teams: 12
- Finals site: Joe Louis Arena; Detroit, Michigan
- Champions: Michigan (5th title)
- Winning coach: Red Berenson (5th title)
- MVP: Mike Cammalleri (Michigan)
- CCHA Men's Ice Hockey Tournaments

The 2002 CCHA Men's Ice Hockey Tournament was the 31st CCHA Men's Ice Hockey Tournament in conference history. It was played between March 8 and March 17, 2002. First round games were played at campus sites, while all 'super six' games were played at Joe Louis Arena in Detroit, Michigan. By winning the tournament, Michigan won the Mason Cup and received the Central Collegiate Hockey Association's automatic bid to the 2002 NCAA Division I Men's Ice Hockey Tournament.

== Format ==
The tournament featured four rounds of play. In the First Round, the first and twelfth seeds, the second and eleventh seeds, the third and tenth seeds, the fourth and ninth seeds, the fifth and eighth seeds and the sixth and seventh seeds played a best-of-three series. All six victors in the first round advance as the newly minted 'Super Six' and play only single-elimination for the duration of the tournament. The top two ranked winners receive byes into the semifinals while the four other teams play in the quarterfinals to determine the other qualifiers. In the semifinals, the remaining highest and lowest seeds and second highest and second lowest seeds play a single-game, with the winners advancing to the finals. The tournament champion receives an automatic bid to the 2002 NCAA Men's Division I Ice Hockey Tournament.

== Conference standings ==
Note: GP = Games played; W = Wins; L = Losses; T = Ties; PTS = Points; GF = Goals For; GA = Goals Against

2001–02 Central Collegiate Hockey Association standings
| | Conference | | | | | | | Overall | | | | | |
| | GP | W | L | T | PTS | GF | GA | GP | W | L | T | GF | GA |
|---|---|---|---|---|---|---|---|---|---|---|---|---|---|
| #4 Michigan†* | 28 | 19 | 5 | 4 | 42 | 97 | 56 | 44 | 28 | 11 | 5 | 154 | 102 |
| #8 Michigan State | 28 | 18 | 6 | 4 | 40 | 87 | 47 | 41 | 27 | 9 | 5 | 129 | 73 |
| #11 Northern Michigan | 28 | 16 | 10 | 2 | 34 | 86 | 69 | 40 | 26 | 12 | 2 | 135 | 98 |
| #12 Alaska-Fairbanks | 28 | 15 | 10 | 3 | 33 | 91 | 55 | 37 | 22 | 12 | 3 | 132 | 108 |
| Nebraska-Omaha | 28 | 13 | 11 | 4 | 30 | 72 | 64 | 41 | 21 | 16 | 4 | 112 | 102 |
| Western Michigan | 28 | 13 | 12 | 3 | 29 | 92 | 92 | 38 | 19 | 15 | 4 | 123 | 118 |
| #15 Ohio State | 28 | 12 | 12 | 4 | 28 | 71 | 81 | 40 | 20 | 16 | 4 | 109 | 112 |
| Notre Dame | 28 | 12 | 12 | 4 | 28 | 95 | 86 | 38 | 16 | 17 | 5 | 117 | 113 |
| Ferris State | 28 | 12 | 15 | 1 | 25 | 86 | 83 | 36 | 15 | 20 | 1 | 117 | 109 |
| Miami | 28 | 9 | 17 | 2 | 20 | 68 | 88 | 36 | 12 | 22 | 2 | 89 | 121 |
| Bowling Green | 28 | 7 | 18 | 3 | 17 | 78 | 104 | 40 | 9 | 25 | 6 | 103 | 145 |
| Lake Superior State | 28 | 4 | 22 | 2 | 10 | 38 | 106 | 37 | 8 | 27 | 2 | 61 | 132 |
Championship: Michigan † indicates conference regular season champion * indicates conference tournament champion Final rankings: USA Today/American Hockey Magazine Poll Top 15 Poll

== Bracket ==
Teams are reseeded after the first round and quarterfinals

First Round; March 8–10
1 | Michigan | 3 | 4 | 4
12 | Lake Superior State | 4 | 1 | 1
2 | Michigan State | 4* | 4 | –
11 | Bowling Green | 3 | 2 | –
3 | Northern Michigan | 4 | 5 | –
10 | Miami | 0 | 2 | –
4 | Alaska-Fairbanks | 6 | 2 | –
9 | Ferris State | 3 | 1 | –
5 | Nebraska-Omaha | 3** | 1 | 1
8 | Notre Dame | 2 | 2* | 2
6 | Western Michigan | 2 | 1 | –
7 | Ohio State | 3* | 3 | –

Quarterfinals; March 15
4 | Alaska-Fairbanks | 5
7 | Ohio State | 6*
3 | Northern Michigan | 3
8 | Notre Dame | 1

Semifinals; March 16
1 | Michigan | 2
7 | Ohio State | 1
2 | Michigan State | 2
3 | Northern Michigan | 1

Championship; March 17
1 | Michigan | 3
2 | Michigan State | 2

Note: * denotes overtime period(s)

=== First round ===
==== (1) Michigan vs. (12) Lake Superior State ====
| March 8 | Michigan | 3 – 4 | Lake Superior State | Yost Ice Arena | Recap |
| No Scoring | | First period | 00:36 - SH - Jeremy Bachusz; 02:32 - Chris McNamara (Peterson); 14:07 - Jeremy Bachusz (Davis, Nightingale) |
| (Swistak, Moss) Eric Werner - 07:09 (Moss, Komisarek) Michael Woodford - PP - 07:56 | | Second period | 05:44 - GW - Chris McNamara (Bachusz) |
| (Cammalleri, Gajic) Jed Ortmeyer - EA - 18:11 | | Third period | No scoring |
| Josh Blackburn ( 12 saves / 16 shots ) | | Goalie stats | Matt Violin ( 39 saves / 42 shots ) |

| March 9 | Michigan | 4 – 1 | Lake Superior State | Yost Ice Arena | Recap |
| (Gajic, Henderson) Michael Woodford - 05:03; Mike Cammalleri - GW - 10:32 | | First period | No scoring |
| No scoring | | Second period | 12:40 - PP - Bo Cheesman (Magnuson, Peterson) |
| (Komisarek, Shouneyia) Mike Cammalleri - PP - 15:16 (Vancik) Mike Cammalleri - EN - 17:50 | | Third period | No scoring |
| Josh Blackburn ( 15 saves / 16 shots ) | | Goalie stats | Matt Violin ( 31 saves / 34 shots ) / Terry Denike ( 1 saves / 1 shots ) |

| March 10 | Michigan | 4 – 1 | Lake Superior State | Yost Ice Arena |
| (Komisarek, Shouneyia) Mike Cammalleri - PP - 19:19 | | First period | No scoring |
| (Nystrom, Ortmeyer) Mike Cammalleri - GW - 4:32 | | Second period | No scoring |
| (Cammalleri, Ortmeyer) Eric Nystrom - 08:46; John Shouneyia - EN - 18:53 | | Third period | 02:00 - PP - Jeremy Bachusz (Davis, Mushaluk) |
| Josh Blackburn ( 12 saves / 13 shots ) | | Goalie stats | Matt Violin ( 22 saves / 25 shots ) |

| Michigan won series 2–1 |

==== (2) Michigan State vs. (11) Bowling Green ====
| March 8 | Michigan State | 4 – 3 | OT | Bowling Green | Munn Ice Arena | Recap |
| (Estrada, Markusen) Mike Lalonde - 07:19 | | First period | | 02:13 - Steve Brudzewski (Moore, Knight) |
| No scoring | | Second period | | 11:22 - Kevin Bieksa (Day, Barlow) |
| (Slater, Liles) Mike Lalonde - PP - 10:31 (Hall, Lalonde) Jim Slater - EA - 19:19 | | Third period | | 05:41 - PP - Austin de Luis (Bieksa, Wires) |
| (Radunske, Slater) Adam Hall - GW - 04:57 | | First overtime period | | No scoring |
| Ryan Miller ( 23 saves / 26 shots ) | | Goalie stats | | Tyler Masters ( 33 saves / 37 shots ) |

| March 9 | Michigan State | 4 – 2 | Bowling Green | Munn Ice Arena | Recap |
| (Falardeau) Steve Jackson - 03:43 | | First period | No scoring |
| (Hutchinson, Goldie) John-Michael Liles - PP - 07:50 | | Second period | No scoring |
| (Jackson, Fast) Jim Slater - GW - 05:17 (Liles, Goldie) Andrew Hutchinson - PP - 06:34 | | Third period | 16:54 - Marc Barlow (Knight); 19:11 - Grady Moore (Barlow, McConvey) |
| Ryan Miller ( 22 saves / 24 shots ) | | Goalie stats | Tyler Masters ( 30 saves / 34 shots ) |

| Michigan State won series 2–0 |

==== (3) Northern Michigan vs. (10) Miami ====
| March 8 | Northern Michigan | 4 – 0 | Miami | Berry Events Center | Recap |
| No Scoring | | First period | No scoring |
| (Jackson, Sawruk) Terry Harrison - GW - 04:42 (Donnette, Michelutti) Alan Swanson - 08:18 (Jackson, Theuer) Ryan Carrigan - 08:50 (Carrigan, Theuer) Chris Gobert - 13:35 | | Second period | No scoring |
| No scoring | | Third period | No scoring |
| Craig Kowalski ( 24 saves / 24 shots ) | | Goalie stats | David Burleigh ( 17 saves / 21 shots ) / David Bowen ( 3 saves / 3 shots ) |

| March 9 | Northern Michigan | 5 – 3 | Miami | Berry Events Center |
| (Theuer, Connolly) Chris Gobert - 16:58 | | First period | 15:19 - PP - Mike Kompon (Edwardson); 18:10 - Derek Edwardson (Stevens, Ortmeyer) |
| (Michelutti, Kinnunen) Dan Donnette - PP - 01:32 (Swanson, Kinnunen) Jim Jackson - 05:08 (Robertson, Bonk) Ryan Moderson - GW - 16:39 (Theuer, Stutzel) Bryce Cockburn - 17:26 | | Second period | 19:56 - PP - Evan Cheverie (Edwardson, Jardine) |
| No scoring | | Third period | No scoring |
| Craig Kowalski ( 27 saves / 30 shots ) | | Goalie stats | David Burleigh ( 15 saves / 20 shots ) |

| Northern Michigan won series 2–0 |

==== (4) Alaska-Fairbanks vs. (9) Ferris State ====
| March 8 | Alaska-Fairbanks | 6 – 3 | Ferris State | Carlson Center | Recap |
| (Voros, Carriere) Cory Rask - PP - 03:17 | | First period | 11:47 - Brett Smith (Caudill, Field) |
| No scoring | | Second period | No scoring |
| (Andrews, Keith) Aaron Voros - PP - 00:48 (Keough, Herman) Cramer Hickey - 01:21 (Lang, Herman) Filipe Larranaga - GW PP - 14:20 (Grosul, Campbell) Jason Grinevitch - 15:23; Aaron Grosul - EN - 19:59 | | Third period | 15:41 - Trevor Large; 18:25 - Trevor Large (Legue, York) |
| Lance Mayes ( 26 saves / 29 shots ) | | Goalie stats | Mike Brown ( 30 saves / 35 shots ) |

| March 9 | Alaska-Fairbanks | 2 – 1 | Ferris State | Carlson Center |
| (Herman, Farrell) Cory Rask - 16:47 (Hickey, Bablitz) Ryan Campbell - GW - 19:58 | | First period | 07:29 - Simon Mangos (Nesbitt) |
| No scoring | | Second period | No scoring |
| No scoring | | Third period | No scoring |
| Preston McKay ( 26 saves / 27 shots ) | | Goalie stats | Mike Brown ( 17 saves / 19 shots ) |

| Alaska won series 2–0 |

==== (5) Nebraska-Omaha vs. (8) Notre Dame ====
| March 8 | Nebraska-Omaha | 3 – 2 | 2OT | Notre Dame | Omaha Civic Auditorium | Recap |
| Chris Claffey - 10:41; Shane Glover - 16:20 | | First period | | 14:42 - Tom Galvin |
| No scoring | | Second period | | 04:52 - Brad Wanchulak |
| No scoring | | Third period | | No scoring |
| (Wong) Jeff Hoggan - GW - 00:40 | | Second overtime period | | No scoring |
| Dan Ellis ( 32 saves / 34 shots ) | | Goalie stats | | Morgan Cey ( 29 saves / 32 shots ) |

| March 9 | Nebraska-Omaha | 1 – 2 | OT | Notre Dame | Omaha Civic Auditorium | Recap |
| No Scoring | | First period | | 00:18 - PP - Evan Nielsen (Maruk, Wroblewski) |
| (Hacker, Glover) Anthony Adams - PP - 06:07 | | Second period | | No scoring |
| No scoring | | Third period | | No scoring |
| No scoring | | First overtime period | | 08:09 - GW - David Inman (Galvin, Dunlop) |
| Dan Ellis ( 30 saves / 32 shots ) | | Goalie stats | | Morgan Cey ( 40 saves / 41 shots ) |

| March 10 | Nebraska-Omaha | 1 – 2 | Notre Dame | Omaha Civic Auditorium | Recap |
| (Brisson, Turner) Kyle O'Keefe - 07:42 | | First period | 19:56 - PP - Jon Maruk (Wroblewski, Dunlup) |
| No scoring | | Second period | 18:03 - GW - Evan Nielsen (Wanchulak, Wiegand) |
| No scoring | | Third period | No scoring |
| Dan Ellis ( 22 saves / 24 shots ) | | Goalie stats | Morgan Cey ( 30 saves / 31 shots ) |

| Notre Dame won series 2–1 |

==== (6) Western Michigan vs. (7) Ohio State ====
| March 8 | Western Michigan | 2 – 3 | OT | Ohio State | Lawson Arena | Recap |
| (Jarmuth) Dana Lattery - 08:32 | | First period | | No scoring |
| No scoring | | Second period | | 09:08 - Paul Caponigri (May, Crain) |
| (Campbell) Patrick Dwyer - 17:50 | | Third period | | 16:01 - Daymen Bencharski (Umberger, McCormick) |
| No scoring | | First overtime period | | 19:31 - GW - Daymen Bencharski (Andress) |
| Jeff Reynaert ( 35 saves / 38 shots ) | | Goalie stats | | Mike Betz ( 19 saves / 21 shots ) |

| March 9 | Western Michigan | 1 – 3 | Ohio State | Lawson Arena | Recap |
| No Scoring | | First period | 01:07 - PP - Mike McCormick (Umberger, Broccoli) |
| No scoring | | Second period | No scoring |
| (Crane, Davies) Lucas Drake - 07:37 | | Third period | 04:12 - GW - Dave Steckel; 19:34 - EN PP - Dave Steckel (Bittner, Skaug) |
| Jeff Reynaert ( 21 saves / 23 shots ) | | Goalie stats | Mike Betz ( 20 saves / 21 shots ) |

| Ohio State won series 2–0 |

=== Quarterfinals ===
==== (3) Northern Michigan vs. (8) Notre Dame ====
| March 15 | Northern Michigan | 3 – 1 | Notre Dame | Joe Louis Arena | Recap |
| No Scoring | | First period | 18:55 - David Inman (Wroblewski, Dunlop) |
| (Theuer) Chris Gobert - 17:37 | | Second period | No scoring |
| Chris Gobert - GW - 07:30 (Theuer, Donnette) Chris Gobert - EN - 19:44 | | Third period | No scoring |
| Craig Kowalski ( 23 saves / 24 shots ) | | Goalie stats | Morgan Cey ( 17 saves / 19 shots ) |

==== (4) Alaska-Fairbanks vs. (7) Ohio State ====
| March 15 | Alaska-Fairbanks | 5 – 6 | OT | Ohio State | Joe Louis Arena | Recap |
| (Voros, Keith) Bobby Andrews - 14:14 (Carriere, Campbell) Jared Sylvestre - 18:11 | | First period | | 03:38 - PP - Daymen Bencharski (Welsh, May); 13:40 - Miguel Lefleche (Bittner) |
| Ryan Lang - 12:20 | | Second period | | 13:04 - Daymen Bencharski (Umberger) |
| (Rask) Daniel Carriere - 02:53 (Carriere, Voros) Cam Keith - 03:13 | | Third period | | 10:45 - Jason Crain (Lefleche, Gagne); 16:39 - Paul Caponigri |
| No scoring | | First overtime period | | 05:01 - GW - Chris Olsgard |
| Lance Mayes ( 6 saves / 8 shots ) / Preston McKay ( 29 saves / 33 shots ) | | Goalie stats | | Mike Betz ( 24 saves / 29 shots ) |

=== Semifinals ===
==== (1) Michigan vs. (7) Ohio State ====
| March 16 | Michigan | 2 – 1 | OT | Ohio State | Joe Louis Arena | Recap |
| (Ortmeyer) Mike Cammalleri - 09:05 | | First period | | No scoring |
| No scoring | | Second period | | 19:26 - Scott May (Caponigri) |
| No scoring | | Third period | | No scoring |
| (Shouneyia, Werner) Mike Cammalleri - GW PP - 05:23 | | First overtime period | | No scoring |
| Josh Blackburn ( 32 saves / 33 shots ) | | Goalie stats | | Mike Betz ( 19 saves / 20 shots ) |

==== (2) Michigan State vs. (3) Northern Michigan ====
| March 16 | Michigan State | 2 – 1 | Northern Michigan | Joe Louis Arena | Recap |
| (Slater, Radunske) Adam Hall - 03:56 | | First period | No scoring |
| (Goldie) Brad Fast - GW - 16:29 | | Second period | 03:08 - Alex Sawruk (Bonk, Owens) |
| No scoring | | Third period | No scoring |
| Ryan Miller ( 23 saves / 24 shots ) | | Goalie stats | Craig Kowalski ( 39 saves / 41 shots ) |

=== Championship ===
==== (1) Michigan vs. (2) Michigan State ====
| March 17 | Michigan | 3 – 2 | Michigan State | Joe Louis Arena | Recap |
| (Gajic, Shouneyia) Mark Mink - 03:43 | | First period | 06:55 - Ash Goldie (Fast) |
| (Cammalleri) Jed Ortmeyer - 09:02 | | Second period | 18:56 - Steve Clark (Insana) |
| (Nystrom, Cammalleri) Jed Ortmeyer - GW PP - 04:39 | | Third period | No scoring |
| Josh Blackburn ( 21 saves / 23 shots ) | | Goalie stats | Ryan Miller ( 24 saves / 27 shots ) |

== Tournament awards ==
=== All-Tournament Team ===
- F Michael Cammalleri* (Michigan)
- F Chris Gobert (Northern Michigan)
- F Jed Ortmeyer (Michigan)
- D Brad Fast (Michigan State)
- D Mike Komisarek (Michigan)
- G Josh Blackburn (Michigan)

* Most Valuable Player(s)
