= 2003 CCHA men's ice hockey tournament =

2003 CCHA Men's ice hockey tournament
- Dates: March 14–22, 2003
- Teams: 12
- Finals site: Joe Louis Arena; Detroit, Michigan
- Champions: Michigan (6th title)
- Winning coach: Red Berenson (6th title)
- MVP: Dwight Helminen (Michigan)
- CCHA Men's Ice Hockey Tournaments

The 2003 CCHA Men's Ice Hockey Tournament was the 32nd CCHA Men's Ice Hockey Tournament in conference history. It was played between March 14 and March 22, 2003. First round games were played at campus sites, while all 'super six' games were played at Joe Louis Arena in Detroit, Michigan. By winning the tournament, Michigan won the Mason Cup and received the Central Collegiate Hockey Association's automatic bid to the 2003 NCAA Division I Men's Ice Hockey Tournament.

== Format ==
The tournament featured four rounds of play. In the First Round, the first and twelfth seeds, the second and eleventh seeds, the third and tenth seeds, the fourth and ninth seeds, the fifth and eighth seeds and the sixth and seventh seeds played a best-of-three series. All six victors in the first round advance as the newly minted 'Super Six' and play only single-elimination for the duration of the tournament. The top two ranked winners receive byes into the semifinals while the four other teams play in the quarterfinals to determine the other qualifiers. In the semifinals, the remaining highest and lowest seeds and second highest and second lowest seeds play a single-game, with the winners advancing to the finals. The tournament champion receives an automatic bid to the 2003 NCAA Men's Division I Ice Hockey Tournament.

== Conference standings ==
Note: GP = Games played; W = Wins; L = Losses; T = Ties; PTS = Points; GF = Goals For; GA = Goals Against

2002–03 Central Collegiate Hockey Association standings
	Conference							Overall					
	GP	W	L	T	PTS	GF	GA	GP	W	L	T	GF	GA
#6 Ferris State†	28	22	5	1	45	121	64	42	31	10	1	188	100
#4 Michigan*	28	18	7	3	39	111	72	43	30	10	3	167	103
#12 Ohio State	28	16	8	4	36	90	63	43	25	13	5	129	95
#15 Michigan State	28	17	10	1	35	113	83	39	23	14	2	154	118
Northern Michigan	28	14	13	1	29	91	83	41	22	17	2	144	120
Miami	28	13	12	3	29	86	66	41	21	17	3	132	101
Notre Dame	28	13	12	3	29	90	90	40	17	17	6	122	123
Western Michigan	28	13	14	1	27	92	101	38	15	21	2	122	147
Alaska-Fairbanks	28	10	11	7	27	78	104	36	15	14	7	111	130
Nebraska-Omaha	28	9	17	2	20	64	97	40	13	22	5	98	135
Bowling Green	28	5	20	3	13	71	116	36	8	25	3	94	143
Lake Superior State	28	3	24	1	7	40	108	38	6	28	4	60	146
Championship: Michigan † indicates conference regular season champion * indicates conference tournament champion Final rankings: USA Today/American Hockey Magazine Poll Top 15 Poll

== Bracket ==
Teams are reseeded after the first round and quarterfinals

First Round; March 14–16
1	Ferris State	6	6	–
12	Lake Superior State	1	1	–
2	Michigan	3	4	–
11	Bowling Green	1	3	–
3	Ohio State	4	3	–
10	Nebraska-Omaha	1	1	–
4	Michigan State	11	3	–
9	Alaska-Fairbanks	1	1	–
5	Northern Michigan	8	6	–
8	Western Michigan	3	4	–
6	Miami	4	0	0
7	Notre Dame	2	1	5

Quarterfinals; March 20
4	Michigan State	5
5	Northern Michigan	7
3	Ohio State	3
7	Notre Dame	2

Semifinals; March 21
1	Ferris State	4
5	Northern Michigan	2
2	Michigan	3
3	Ohio State	0

Championship; March 22
1	Ferris State	3
2	Michigan	5
Third Place
3	Ohio State	1
5	Northern Michigan	4

Note: * denotes overtime period(s)

=== First round ===
==== (1) Ferris State vs. (12) Lake Superior State ====
March 14	Ferris State	6 – 1	Lake Superior State	Ewigleben Arena	Recap
(Scheible, Thomson) Trevor Large - 11:22		First period	No scoring
(Milam, Kunitz) Derek Nesbitt - GW PP - 09:45 (Nesbitt) Jeff Legue - 14:04		Second period	19:00 - PP - Jon Booras (Peterson, Cheesman)
(York, Scherlnick) Mike Kinnie - PP - 07:35 (Smith, McIver) Kevin Caudill - 14:17 (Legue, Nesbitt) Chris Kunitz - PP - 19:29		Third period	No scoring
Mike Brown ( 31 saves / 32 shots )		Goalie stats	Matt Violin ( 32 saves / 38 shots )

March 15	Ferris State	6 – 1	Lake Superior State	Ewigleben Arena	Recap
(Mangos, Kunitz) Derek Nesbitt - 08:50 (Lewandowski, Scherlnick) Greg Rallo - GW - 15:08 (Kunitz, Legue) Derek Nesbitt - PP - 16:12		First period	05:21 - PP - Jon Booras (Peterson, Fauci)
(Legue, Scherlnick) Chris Kunitz - PP - 00:37 (Nesbitt, Legue) Simon Mangos - 18:44		Second period	No scoring
(Scherlnick, Legue) Troy Milam - 08:09		Third period	No scoring
Mike Brown ( 29 saves / 30 shots ) / Matt Swanson ( 3 saves / 3 shots )		Goalie stats	Matt Violin ( 13 saves / 17 shots ) / Terry Denike ( 21 saves / 23 shots )

Ferris State won series 2–0

==== (2) Michigan vs. (11) Bowling Green ====
March 14	Michigan	3 – 1	Bowling Green	Yost Ice Arena	Recap
No Scoring		First period	12:01 - Mike Falk (Pedota, McConvey)
(Tambellini, Rogers) John Shouneyia - PP - 00:56 (Tambellini, Shouneyia) Jed Ortmeyer - GW - 08:13		Second period	No scoring
(Burnes, Tambellini) Dwight Helminen - 03:07		Third period	No scoring
Al Montoya ( 24 saves / 25 shots )		Goalie stats	Jordan Sigalet ( 37 saves / 40 shots )

March 15	Michigan	4 – 3	Bowling Green	Yost Ice Arena	Recap
(Shouneyia, Rogers) Jed Ortmeyer - PP - 05:01 (Ebbett, Rogers) Milan Gajic - PP - 16:45 (Gajic, Ryznar) David Moss - 18:57		First period	07:08 - Brett Pilkington (Knight, Wires)
No scoring		Second period	No scoring
(Mink) Dwight Helminen - GW EN - 18:40		Third period	18:51 - Ryan Barnett (Bieksa); 19:47 - EA - Tyler Knight (Morrison, Bieksa)
Al Montoya ( 28 saves / 31 shots )		Goalie stats	Tyler Masters ( 32 saves / 35 shots )

Michigan won series 2–0

==== (3) Ohio State vs. (10) Nebraska-Omaha ====
March 14	Ohio State	4 – 1	Nebraska-Omaha	Value City Arena	Recap
(Lafleche, Palvas) Scott May - 05:35 (Bencharski, Umberger) Scott May - GW PP - 14:12		First period	No scoring
(Bencharski) R.J. Umberger - 01:35; Ryan Kesler - SH - 14:41		Second period	No scoring
No scoring		Third period	16:16 - David Brisson (Zanon)
Mike Betz ( 17 saves / 18 shots )		Goalie stats	Dan Ellis ( 53 saves / 57 shots )

March 15	Ohio State	3 – 1	Nebraska-Omaha	Value City Arena	Recap
(Spector, Broccoli) Chris Olsgard - 06:49		First period	17:22 - PP - Joe Pereira (Blanshan, Wong)
No scoring		Second period	No scoring
(Caponigri, Pelley) R.J. Umberger - GW PP - 05:07 (Skaug, Titus) Miguel Lafleche - 09:36		Third period	No scoring
Mike Betz ( 19 saves / 20 shots )		Goalie stats	Dan Ellis ( 37 saves / 40 shots )

Ohio State won series 2–0

==== (4) Michigan State vs. (9) Alaska-Fairbanks ====
March 14	Michigan State	11 – 1	Alaska-Fairbanks	Munn Ice Arena	Recap
(Potter, Maloney) Brock Radunske - 06:32; Kevin Estrada - GW - 07:39 (Falardeau, Maloney) Brock Radunske - 08:59 (Liles) Ash Goldie - PP - 12:58 (Estrada, Goldie) Colton Fretter - 15:10		First period	No scoring
(Slater) David Booth - 07:51 (Lalonde, Fast) Jim Slater - 13:46		Second period	03:09 - Scott Vockeroth (Schmidt)
(Liles) Brock Radunske - 00:35 (Fast, Lalonde) Jim Slater - PP - 03:48 (Fretter, Estrada) Ash Goldie - 11:11 (Maloney) Lee Falardeau - 17:21		Third period	No scoring
Matt Migliaccio ( 26 saves / 29 shots )		Goalie stats	Keith Bartusch ( 3 saves / 6 shots ) / Lance Mayes ( 17 saves / 23 shots ) / Preston McKay ( 8 saves / 10 shots )

March 15	Michigan State	3 – 1	Alaska-Fairbanks	Munn Ice Arena	Recap
(Liles, Maloney) Lee Falardeau - 17:45		First period	14:14 - Ryan Lang (Rask, Larranaga)
No scoring		Second period	No scoring
(Radunske) Brian Maloney - GW - 04:08 (Markusen) Tim Hearon - 12:52		Third period	No scoring
Matt Migliaccio ( 35 saves / 36 shots )		Goalie stats	Lance Mayes ( 14 saves / 15 shots ) / Preston McKay ( 22 saves / 24 shots )

Michigan State won series 2–0

==== (5) Northern Michigan vs. (8) Western Michigan ====
March 14	Northern Michigan	8 – 3	Western Michigan	Berry Events Center	Recap
(Donnette, Michelutti) Justin Kinnunen - 05:27		First period	15:59 - Vince Bellissimo (Dwyer, Yamashita)
(Contois, Miller) Chris Gobert - 06:51 (Milam, Harrison) Andrew Contois - PP - 09:15 (Bianchin, Gardner) Alan Swanson - GW - 17:01		Second period	05:13 - Shaun Rose (Rumble, Cooke)
(Michelutti, Waugh) Justin Kinnunen - 00:43 (Michelutti, Donnette) Justin Kinnunen - 12:30 (Gobert) Terry Harrison - SH - 19:09; Jim Jackson - SH - 19:59		Third period	11:07 - Brent Rumble (Campbell, Cooke)
Craig Kowalski ( 19 saves / 22 shots )		Goalie stats	Scott Foster ( 26 saves / 34 shots )

March 15	Northern Michigan	6 – 4	Western Michigan	Berry Events Center
(Alen, Jackson) Terry Harrison - PP - 05:48 (Contois, Harrison) Juha Alen - PP - 08:52		First period	No scoring
(Gobert, Contois) Terry Harrison - 05:01		Second period	04:13 - Brent Rumble (Rose); 07:15 - PP - Dave Cousineau (Bellissimo, Walton); 11:19 - Patrick Dwyer (Lattery, Bellissimo)
(Gobert, Cockburn) Jim Jackson - PP - 12:52 (Cockburn, Alen) Mike Stutzel - GW EN - 18:41 (Alen, Gobert) Mike Stutzel - EN PP - 19:58		Third period	19:06 - SH - Vince Bellissimo (Walton Lattery)
Craig Kowalski ( 27 saves / 31 shots )		Goalie stats	Scott Foster ( 14 saves / 18 shots ) Mike Mantua ( 0 saves / 0 shots )

Northern Michigan won series 2–0

==== (6) Miami vs. (7) Notre Dame ====
March 14	Miami	4 – 2	Notre Dame	Goggin Ice Arena	Recap
(Hustead, Stewart) Chris Michael - 04:56		First period	No scoring
No scoring		Second period	No scoring
(Kompon, Michael) Gregory Hogeboom - PP - 08:05 (Kompon) Gregory Hogeboom - GW - 11:07 (Kompon) Gregory Hogeboom - 15:25		Third period	00:39 - Aaron Gill (Nielsen); 08:19 - Cory McLean (Amado, Galvin)
David Burleigh ( 24 saves / 26 shots )		Goalie stats	Morgan Cey ( 33 saves / 37 shots )

March 15	Miami	0 – 1	Notre Dame	Goggin Ice Arena	Recap
No Scoring		First period	No scoring
No scoring		Second period	No scoring
No scoring		Third period	07:18 - GW - Tim Wallace (Lebda, Wiegand)
David Burleigh ( 29 saves / 30 shots )		Goalie stats	Morgan Cey ( 37 saves / 37 shots )

March 16	Miami	0 – 5	Notre Dame	Goggin Ice Arena	Recap
No Scoring		First period	08:33 - GW - Rob Globke (Zurenko, Komadoski)
No scoring		Second period	19:28 - Brett Lebda
No scoring		Third period	03:52 - Aaron Gill (Globke, Dunlop); 10:55 - PP - Aaron Gill (McLean, Komadoski); 15:06 - Brad Wanchulak (Wiegand)
David Burleigh ( 22 saves / 27 shots )		Goalie stats	Morgan Cey ( 32 saves / 32 shots )

Notre Dame won series 2–1

=== Quarterfinals ===
==== (3) Ohio State vs. (7) Notre Dame ====
March 20	Ohio State	3 – 2	Notre Dame	Joe Louis Arena	Recap
No Scoring		First period	No scoring
(Olsgard, Steckel) T.J. Latorre - 02:44 (Caponigri, Skaug) Ryan Kesler - 17:54		Second period	08:59 - Brad Wanchulak; 13:58 - Rob Globke (Dunlop)
(Caponigri, Andress) Nate Guenin - GW - 06:09		Third period	No scoring
Mike Betz ( 20 saves / 22 shots )		Goalie stats	Morgan Cey ( 22 saves / 25 shots )

==== (4) Michigan State vs. (5) Northern Michigan ====
March 20	Michigan State	5 – 7	Northern Michigan	Joe Louis Arena	Recap
Brian Maloney - 12:03 (Liles) Brian Maloney - PP - 19:25		First period	10:17 - PP - Bryce Cockburn (Jackson); 11:30 - Mike Stutzel (Cockburn)
(Liles, Fast) Brock Radunske - PP - 02:53		Second period	08:20 - Terry Harrison (Oystrick, Contois)
(Fast, Gajic) Kevin Estrada - 08:19 (Slater) Brian Maloney - 13:58		Third period	10:32 - PP - Kevin Gardner; 12:16 - Dirk Southern (Cockburn, Jackson); 16:11 - GW - Nathan Oystrick (Swanson); 19:40 - EN - Chris Gobert
Matt Migliaccio ( 22 saves / 28 shots )		Goalie stats	Craig Kowalski ( 41 saves / 46 shots )

=== Semifinals ===
==== (1) Ferris State vs. (5) Northern Michigan ====
March 21	Ferris State	4 – 2	Northern Michigan	Joe Louis Arena	Recap
Chris Kunitz - 05:25 (Legue, Scherlnick) Chris Kunitz - 11:49		First period	No scoring
(Kunitz, Nesbitt) Jeff Legue - GW - 18:04		Second period	03:47 - Jamie Milam (Alen); 10:51 - Chris Gobert (Contois, Harrison)
Phil Lewandowski - 07:45		Third period	No scoring
Mike Brown ( 29 saves / 31 shots )		Goalie stats	Craig Kowalski ( 41 saves / 45 shots )

==== (2) Michigan vs. (3) Ohio State ====
March 21	Michigan	3 – 0	Ohio State	Joe Louis Arena	Recap
No Scoring		First period	No scoring
(Nystrom, Richmond) Dwight Helminen - GW - 08:06 (Swistak) Dwight Helminen - 10:43		Second period	No scoring
(Martens) Dwight Helminen - SH - 09:37		Third period	No scoring
Al Montoya ( 31 saves / 31 shots )		Goalie stats	Mike Betz ( 21 saves / 24 shots )

=== Third Place ===
==== (3) Ohio State vs. (5) Northern Michigan ====
March 22	Ohio State	1 – 4	Northern Michigan	Joe Louis Arena	Recap
R.J. Umberger - PP - 12:06		First period	15:23 - Dirk Southern (Milam, Jackson)
No scoring		Second period	12:37 - GW PP - Jamie Milam (Alen, Sawruk)
No scoring		Third period	03:20 - Bryce Cockburn (Jackson); 12:14 - PP - Mike Stutzel (Cockburn, Michelutti)
Mike Betz ( 18 saves / 22 shots )		Goalie stats	Craig Kowalski ( 31 saves / 32 shots )

=== Championship ===
==== (1) Ferris State vs. (2) Michigan ====
March 22	Ferris State	3 – 5	Michigan	Joe Louis Arena	Recap
(Legue, Mangos) Chris Kunitz - PP - 10:47		First period	04:25 - Jeff Tambellini (Rogers, Shouneyia)
No scoring		Second period	04:45 - Jed Ortmeyer (Shouneyia, Rogers); 18:41 - PP - Jed Ortmeyer (Tambellini, Rogers)
(Legue) Simon Mangos - PP - 03:34 (Rallo, Kinnie) Matt York - 17:00		Third period	05:27 - GW - Michael Woodford (Ebbett); 19:55 - EN - Dwight Helminen
Mike Brown ( 25 saves / 29 shots )		Goalie stats	Al Montoya ( 17 saves / 20 shots )

== Tournament awards ==
=== All-Tournament Team ===
- F Jed Ortmeyer (Michigan)
- F Chris Kunitz (Ferris State)
- F Dwight Helminen* (Michigan)
- D Simon Mangos (Ferris State)
- D Brandon Rogers (Michigan)
- G Al Montoya (Michigan)

* Most Valuable Player(s)

=== Tournament Three Stars ===
- 3 Craig Kowalski (Northern Michigan)
- 2 Chris Kunitz (Ferris State)
- 1 Dwight Helminen (Michigan)
