= Cold War (ice hockey) =

2001 U.S. college ice hockey game

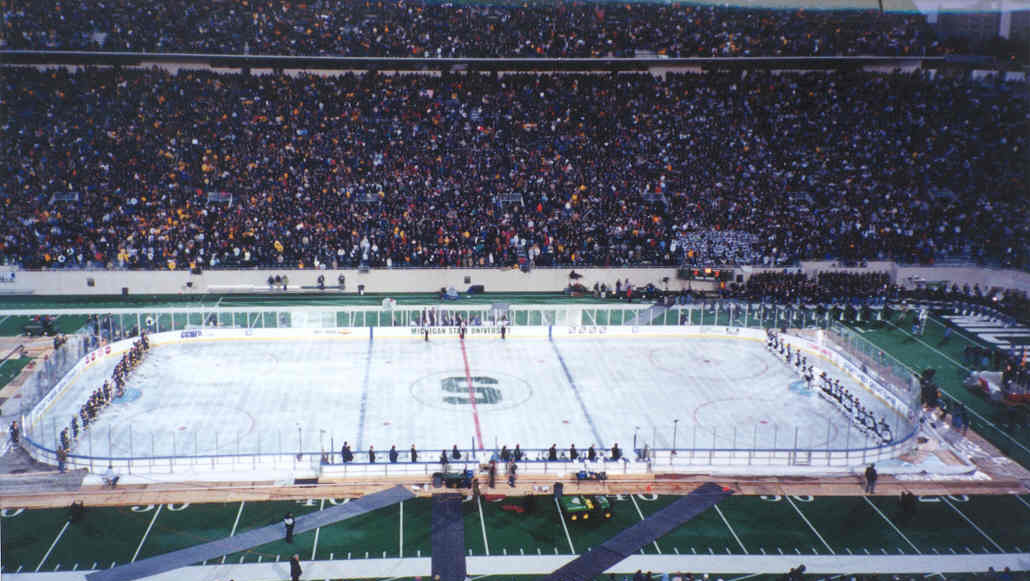
	1	2	3	Total
Michigan	1	1	1	3
Michigan State	1	0	2	3
- Date: October 6, 2001
- Venue: Spartan Stadium
- City: East Lansing, Michigan
- Attendance: 74,544

The Cold War was a college ice hockey game played between U.S. college rivals Michigan State University (MSU) and the University of Michigan (U-M) on October 6, 2001. It set a then-world record for the largest crowd at an ice hockey game with 74,544.

Longtime rivals with the University of Michigan in hockey (and other sports), MSU decided not to play this contest at East Lansing's Munn Ice Arena, but instead set up the ice rink in the middle of the much larger Spartan Stadium, which they filled to 103.4% capacity. This meant that 74,544 packed the Big Ten football stadium (the home of the MSU football team) to watch the MSU Spartans and the U-M Wolverines skate to a 3–3 tie. Two 300-piece marching bands were present on field and the game was internationally televised. Country artist Shannon Brown sang during the second intermission.

== Game summary ==
October 6, 2001	Michigan Wolverines	3–3	Michigan State Spartans	Spartan Stadium	Recap

Scoring summary
Period	Team	Goal	Assist(s)	Time	Score
1st	MSU	Adam Hall (1) – pp	Jim Slater (1) and Joe Goodenow (1)	03:35	1–0 MSU
1st	MICH	Jason Ryznar (1)	Michael Cammalleri (1)	17:13	1–1
2nd	MICH	Michael Cammalleri (1)	Jason Ryznar (1)	03:08	2–1 MICH
3rd	MSU	Duncan Keith (1) – pp	Brad Fast (1) and Ryan Miller (1)	05:43	2–2
3rd	MICH	Michael Cammalleri (2)	Jason Ryznar (2) and Jay Vancik (1)	11:13	3–2 MICH
3rd	MSU	Jim Slater (1)	Adam Hall (1) and Brad Fast (2)	19:13	3–3

Number in parentheses represents the player's total in goals or assists to that point of the season

Penalty summary
Period	Team	Player	Penalty	Time	PIM
1st	MICH	Jed Ortmeyer	Tripping	00:22	2:00
1st	MICH	Andy Burnes	Interference	01:30	2:00
1st	MSU	Troy Ferguson	Holding	06:45	2:00
1st	MICH	Jay Vancik	Roughing	19:44	2:00
1st	MSU	Duncan Keith	Roughing	19:44	2:00
1st	MICH	Michael Woodford	High-sticking	19:44	2:00
1st	MSU	Brad Fast	High-sticking	19:44	2:00
2nd	MSU	Joe Markusen	Hooking	03:40	2:00
2nd	MSU	Troy Ferguson	Roughing	09:31	2:00
2nd	MICH	Michael Woodford	Tripping	10:26	2:00
3rd	MICH	Jason Ryznar	Tripping	00:44	2:00
3rd	MICH	Michael Woodford	Charging	04:05	2:00
3rd	MICH	Andy Burnes	Slashing	05:06	2:00

Shots by period

Team	1	2	3	OT	Total
Michigan	7	9	4	2	22
Michigan State	5	10	8	1	24

Power play opportunities

Team	Goals/Opportunities
Michigan	0/5
Michigan State	2/8

MVP selections

Team	Player	Statistics
Michigan	Michael Cammalleri	2 goals, 1 assist
Michigan State	Jim Slater	1 goal, 1 assist

== Team rosters ==
Michigan Wolverines
#		Player	Position
3	(United States)	Eric Werner	D
4	(United States)	Andy Burnes	D
5	(United States)	Brandon Rogers	D
8	(United States)	Mike Komisarek	D
9	(Canada)	Milan Gajic	RW
10	(United States)	Dwight Helminen	C
11	(United States)	Joe Kautz	RW
12	(United States)	J.J. Swistak	RW
13	(Canada)	Mike Cammalleri (A)	LW
14	(Canada)	Craig Murray	LW
15	(United States)	Jay Vancik	D
17	(United States)	Michael Woodford	RW
18	(United States)	David Moss	RW
21	(United States)	Eric Nystrom	LW
22	(United States)	Jason Ryznar	LW
23	(United States)	Mike Roemensky	D
26	(United States)	Jed Ortmeyer (C)	RW
28	(United States)	John Shouneyia	C
29	(United States)	Josh Blackburn	G
34	(United States)	Kevin O'Malley	G
(Canada)		Head coach: Red Berenson	

Michigan State Spartans
#		Player	Position
2	(United States)	Jon Insana	D
3	(Canada)	Duncan Keith	D
4	(United States)	John-Michael Liles	D
5	(United States)	Joe Markusen	D
5	(United States)	Tim Hearon	C
9	(Canada)	Brock Radunske	LW
10	(Canada)	Kevin Estrada	LW
11	(United States)	Steve Jackson	C
14	(Canada)	Ash Goldie	C
17	(Canada)	Troy Ferguson	RW
18	(United States)	Adam Hall (C)	RW
19	(United States)	Jim Slater	C
20	(Canada)	Brian Maloney	LW
21	(Canada)	Mike Lalonde	LW
22	(United States)	Lee Falardeau	C
24	(United States)	Andrew Hutchinson	D
26	(Canada)	Joe Goodenow	LW
27	(Canada)	Brad Fast (A)	D
30	(United States)	Matt Migliaccio	G
39	(United States)	Ryan Miller	G
(Canada)		Head coach: Ron Mason	

Kevin O'Malley and Matt Migliaccio dressed as the back-up goaltenders. Neither entered the game.

=== Officials ===
- Referees – Steve Piotrowski
- Linesmen – John LaDuke and Kevin Langseth

== Record surpassed ==
The opening game of the 2010 IIHF World Championship took place on May 7, 2010, at the retractable-roof Veltins-Arena, normally used by the soccer club Schalke 04. On this occasion, the stadium's configuration allowed for a capacity of 75,976, which would ultimately be exceeded by almost 2,000, breaking the all-time attendance record.

On December 11, 2010, the two teams involved in the Cold War met again, this time with Michigan hosting the game at its football venue, Michigan Stadium. U-M billed the game as "The Big Chill at the Big House". When U-M halted ticket sales to the general public on May 6, 2010, over 100,000 tickets had been sold. As of the 2010 football season, Michigan Stadium had an official capacity of 109,901. The game ended with a 5–0 victory for the University of Michigan. The record was officially set at 104,173 people.

== Television ==
The game was broadcast by FSN Detroit, which made it available nationally. The announcers were Matt Shepard, Billy Jaffe and Shireen Saski. John Keating hosted a pregame show.

== See also ==
- List of outdoor ice hockey games
- List of ice hockey games with highest attendance
