= J-Money =

J-Money may refer to:

- J-Money (rapper), half of rap duo Cadillac Don & J-Money
- Jonathan Erlichman, Canadian baseball coach
