= Lars Helminen =

American ice hockey player (born 1985)

- Born: January 1, 1985 (age 40); Brighton, Michigan
- Height: 5 ft 7 in (170 cm)
- Weight: 180 lb (82 kg; 12 st 12 lb)
- Position: Defense
- Shot: Right
- Played for: JYP (SM-liiga); Linz EHC (EBEL)
- NHL draft: Undrafted
- Playing career: 2007–2009

Lars Helminen (born January 1, 1985) is an American former professional ice hockey player who played in the ECHL, SM-Liiga, and Austrian Hockey League. His brother, Dwight, played parts of two seasons in the National Hockey League.

== Playing career ==
Lars played for the Compuware Ambassadors in the NAHL during the 2002-03 season. He went on from there to play four years at Michigan Tech. After his senior year, he went straight to the Idaho Steelheads of the ECHL for the end of the 2006–07 season.

Lars spent the 2007-08 season in Finland, playing for JYP in the SM-liiga, along with his brother Dwight. Lars then moved to the EBEL playing with Linz EHC.

== Career statistics ==
			Regular season					Playoffs
Season	Team	League	GP	G	A	Pts	PIM	GP	G	A	Pts	PIM
2002–03	Compuware Ambassadors	NAHL	49	6	29	34	55	—	—	—	—	—
2003–04	Michigan Tech	WCHA	38	2	8	10	43	—	—	—	—	—
2004–05	Michigan Tech	WCHA	37	8	24	32	42	—	—	—	—	—
2005–06	Michigan Tech	WCHA	38	2	17	19	39	—	—	—	—	—
2006–07	Michigan Tech	WCHA	40	2	19	21	32	—	—	—	—	—
2006–07	Idaho Steelheads	ECHL	3	0	0	0	0	22	3	13	16	18
2007–08	JYP	SM-l	43	9	7	16	8	6	0	0	0	0
2008–09	Linz EHC	EBEL	45	1	11	12	26	—	—	—	—	—
SM-l Totals			43	9	7	16	8	6	0	0	0	0

== Awards and honors ==
Award	Year
All-WCHA Second Team	2004–05
