= Jed Ortmeyer =

American ice hockey player (born 1978)

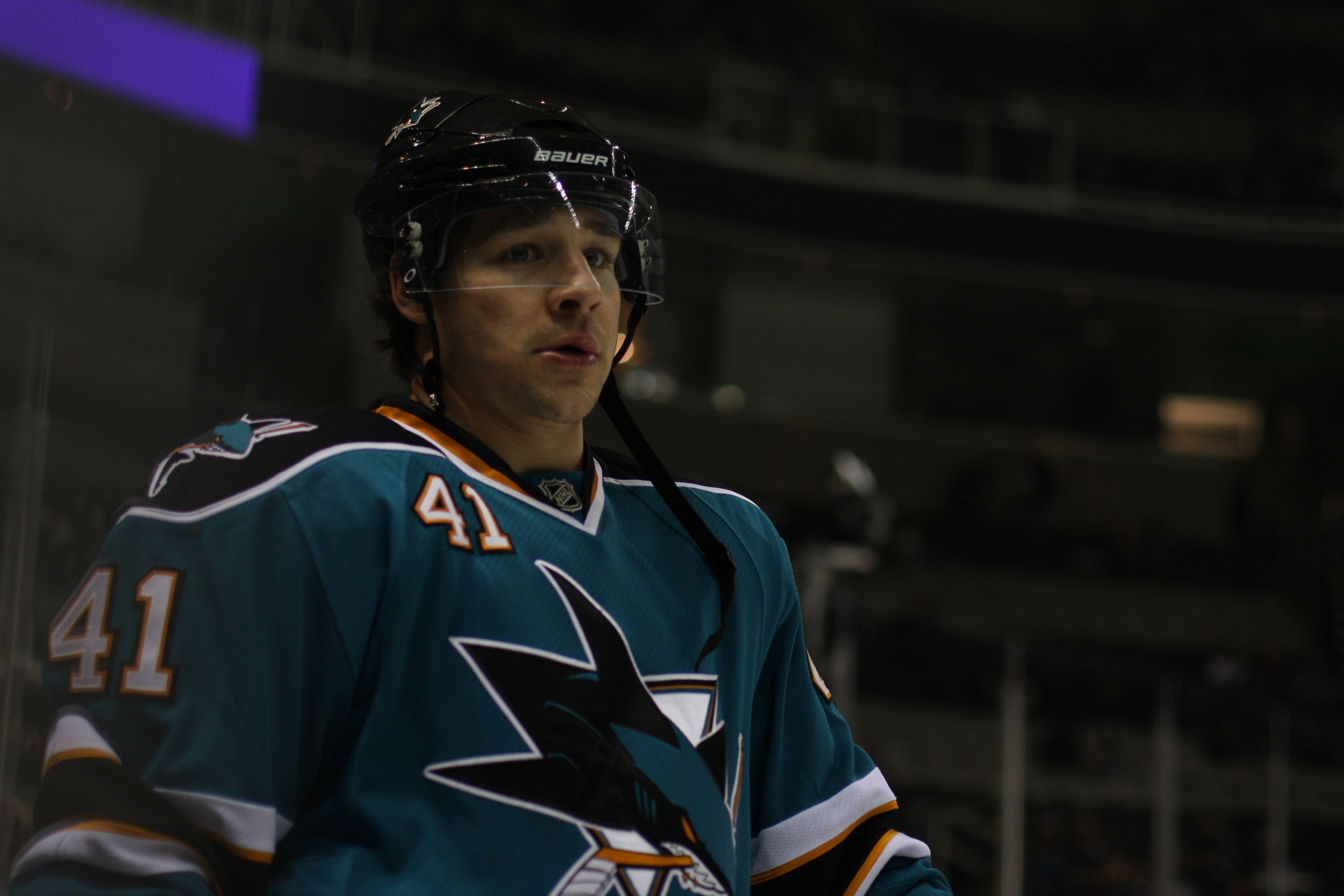
- Ortmeyer with the San Jose Sharks in 2009.
- Born: September 3, 1978 (age 48) Omaha, Nebraska, U.S.
- Height: 6 ft 1 in (185 cm)
- Weight: 190 lb (86 kg; 13 st 8 lb)
- Position: Right wing
- Shot: Right
- Played for: New York Rangers; Nashville Predators; San Jose Sharks; Minnesota Wild
- NHL draft: Undrafted
- Playing career: 2003–2014

Jed Ortmeyer (born September 3, 1978) is an American former professional ice hockey winger who played in the National Hockey League (NHL) with the New York Rangers, Nashville Predators, San Jose Sharks and Minnesota Wild. After his retirement he was inducted into the Omaha Hockey Hall of Fame in 2015. He most recently served as the Director of Player Development with the New York Rangers.

== Playing career ==
=== Amateur ===
Ortmeyer played junior hockey with the Omaha Lancers of the United States Hockey League (USHL) for two seasons. He finished his first season with the Lancers, the 1997–98 season, third on the team in scoring with 48 points in 54 games. During his second season with the Lancers, the 1998–99 season, he led the team in goals with 23 and points with 59. During Ortmeyer's two-year stint with the Lancers, he played with future NHLers Duvie Westcott and Ryan Malone. After two years with the team, he left to begin his NCAA college hockey career.

From 1999 through 2003, Ortmeyer played under coach Red Berenson with the University of Michigan Wolverines, in the Central Collegiate Hockey Association (CCHA). While with Michigan, Ortmeyer's teammates included future NHL players Mike Comrie, Jeff Jillson, Andy Hilbert, Mike Cammalleri, Mike Komisarek, Jeff Tambellini, and fellow New York Rangers prospect Al Montoya. In his second year with the Wolverines, Ortmeyer tore his anterior cruciate ligament (ACL) and missed the last half of the season. The following year, after fully recovering, he was named team captain and enjoyed his most productive college hockey season with a 39-point campaign in his third year.

=== Professional ===
Undrafted by an NHL team, Ortmeyer was signed by the New York Rangers on May 10, 2003. During the 2003–04 NHL season, Ortmeyer split time between the Rangers and their American Hockey League (AHL) affiliate, the Hartford Wolf Pack. He made his Rangers' debut on November 15, 2003 against the New Jersey Devils. He then scored his first NHL goal on November 25 against Nikolai Khabibulin of the Tampa Bay Lightning. He went on to finish the season with 2 goals and 4 assists with the Rangers.

Due to the 2004–05 NHL lockout, Ortmeyer spent the entirety of the following season with the Wolf Pack. He returned to the Rangers full-time in the 2005–06 NHL season, playing on a line with Dominic Moore and Ryan Hollweg, which was known as the "HMO Line". Former Rangers Head Coach Tom Renney reflected upon the "HMO Line", saying, "They were high-octane energy and in your face and just played hard two-way Hockey." Ortmeyer also played on the Rangers' penalty kill unit.

During the 2006 off-season, the "HMO Line" was broken up when Dominic Moore was traded to the Pittsburgh Penguins. During that same off-season, Ortmeyer was sidelined indefinitely on August 14, 2006, after he was diagnosed with a pulmonary embolism. On January 2, 2007, Ortmeyer returned to the Rangers line-up after a conditioning stint with the Wolf Pack, playing 5:35 over 9 shifts. On January 13, in his sixth game since returning, he scored on a shorthanded penalty shot against the Boston Bruins to assure a 3–1 Rangers victory. On January 29, 2007, Ortmeyer posted 3 assists and was named the first star in another game against the Bruins in Boston.

Having made a full recovery, Ortmeyer was, by the vote of Rangers fans, awarded the 2006-07 season Steven McDonald Extra Effort Award, as "the player that goes above and beyond the call of duty." Ortmeyer previously won the award for the 2003-04 season. He was also the Rangers' 2007 nominee to win the Bill Masterton Memorial Trophy for his dedication to the game, evident in his comeback.

Becoming a free agent in the 2007 off-season, Ortmeyer signed a two-year contract with the Nashville Predators on July 2. Playing in his first season with the Predators, Ortmeyer tore his ACL for the second time in his career on February 23, 2008, and missed the remainder of the 2007–08 season. He had surgery to repair his knee, but due to inactivity from the surgery he suffered from blood clots in the leg and missed the first two months of the 2008–09 season. On December 3, 2008, Ortmeyer was placed on waivers by the Predators. After clearing, he was assigned to the Milwaukee Admirals of the AHL.

Ortmeyer signed a one-year deal with the San Jose Sharks on July 16, 2009.

On September 27, 2010, Ortmeyer accepted an invitation to the New York Islanders training camp on a Professional Tryout (PTO). He was released on October 3. He then played on PTOs with the San Antonio Rampage and Houston Aeros of the AHL before signing with the NHL's Minnesota Wild on January 4, 2011. The next day, the Wild assigned him to the Aeros, their AHL affiliate. Ortmeyer spent the rest of 2011 and 2012, spanning over two seasons, being shuttled between the Wild and the Aeros.

A Free Agent during the NHL Lockout, Ortmeyer belatedly signed with the Missouri Mavericks of the Central Hockey League midway through the 2012–13 season on January 25, 2013. After only two games with the Mavericks, Ortmeyer returned to the AHL, signing a contract for the remainder of the year with the San Antonio Rampage on January 31, 2013.

== Personal life ==
Ortmeyer's older brother, Jake Ortmeyer, is a retired college and professional hockey player who was the head coach for the Omaha AAA Hockey Club Peewee, Bantam, and 16, and 18u teams. Jake Ortmeyer played college hockey at Miami (Ohio), at the time a CCHA conference rival of Jed's Michigan teams, meaning the Ortmeyer brothers faced each other several times in their college careers.

In July 2009, Jed married his high school girlfriend, Maggie Jacobson. They went on to have two children, Tova and Dax Ortmeyer.

== Career statistics ==
			Regular season					Playoffs
Season	Team	League	GP	G	A	Pts	PIM	GP	G	A	Pts	PIM
1993–94	Omaha Central High School	HS-NE	14	6	9	15	12	—	—	—	—	—
1994–95	Omaha Central High School	HS-NE	18	18	23	41	20	—	—	—	—	—
1995–96	Omaha Central High School	HS-NE	25	24	33	57	35	—	—	—	—	—
1996–97	Omaha Central High School	HS-NE	26	34	30	64	32	—	—	—	—	—
1997–98	Omaha Lancers	USHL	54	23	25	48	52	14	3	4	7	31
1998–99	Omaha Lancers	USHL	52	23	36	59	81	12	5	6	11	16
1999–2000	University of Michigan	CCHA	41	8	16	24	40	—	—	—	—	—
2000–01	University of Michigan	CCHA	27	10	11	21	52	—	—	—	—	—
2001–02	University of Michigan	CCHA	42	16	23	39	42	—	—	—	—	—
2002–03	University of Michigan	CCHA	36	18	16	34	48	—	—	—	—	—
2003–04	Hartford Wolf Pack	AHL	13	2	8	10	4	16	5	2	7	6
2003–04	New York Rangers	NHL	58	2	4	6	16	—	—	—	—	—
2004–05	Hartford Wolf Pack	AHL	61	7	20	27	63	6	0	1	1	4
2005–06	New York Rangers	NHL	78	5	2	7	38	4	1	0	1	4
2006–07	New York Rangers	NHL	41	2	9	11	22	9	0	0	0	2
2006–07	Hartford Wolf Pack	AHL	8	1	3	4	6	—	—	—	—	—
2007–08	Nashville Predators	NHL	51	4	4	8	32	—	—	—	—	—
2008–09	Nashville Predators	NHL	2	0	0	0	0	—	—	—	—	—
2008–09	Milwaukee Admirals	AHL	55	10	13	23	51	11	1	6	7	8
2009–10	San Jose Sharks	NHL	76	8	11	19	37	4	0	1	1	0
2010–11	San Antonio Rampage	AHL	20	2	1	3	16	—	—	—	—	—
2010–11	Houston Aeros	AHL	40	6	10	16	29	24	6	7	13	4
2010–11	Minnesota Wild	NHL	4	0	0	0	2	—	—	—	—	—
2011–12	Houston Aeros	AHL	34	8	10	18	32	—	—	—	—	—
2011–12	Minnesota Wild	NHL	35	1	1	2	14	—	—	—	—	—
2012–13	Missouri Mavericks	CHL	2	0	0	0	0	—	—	—	—	—
2012–13	San Antonio Rampage	AHL	32	6	9	15	16	—	—	—	—	—
2013–14	San Antonio Rampage	AHL	64	14	17	31	64	—	—	—	—	—
NHL totals			345	22	31	53	161	17	1	1	2	6
AHL totals			327	56	91	147	281	57	12	16	28	22

== Awards and honors ==
Award	Year
USHL All-Rookie Team	1997–98
USHL Second Team All-Star	1997–98
CCHA All-Tournament Team	2002, 2003
Hal Downes Trophy - University of Michigan MVP	2002, 2003
NCAA West Regional All-Tournament Team	2002, 2003
CCHA Best Defensive Forward Award	2003
Bill Beagan Trophy - CCHA Super Six MVP	2003
Steven McDonald Extra Effort Award (New York Rangers)	2004, 2007

Awards and achievements
Preceded by Bobby Andrews	CCHA Best Defensive Forward; 2002-03	Succeeded by Dwight Helminen
Preceded by Mike Cammalleri	CCHA Most Valuable Player in Tournament; 2003	Succeeded by Paul Caponigri
Preceded by Matthew Barnaby	Steven McDonald Extra Effort Award winner 2004	Succeeded by Henrik Lundqvist
Preceded by Henrik Lundqvist	Steven McDonald Extra Effort Award winner 2007	Succeeded by Brandon Dubinsky
