= Michael Cammalleri =

Canadian ice hockey player (born 1982)

Mike Cammalleri
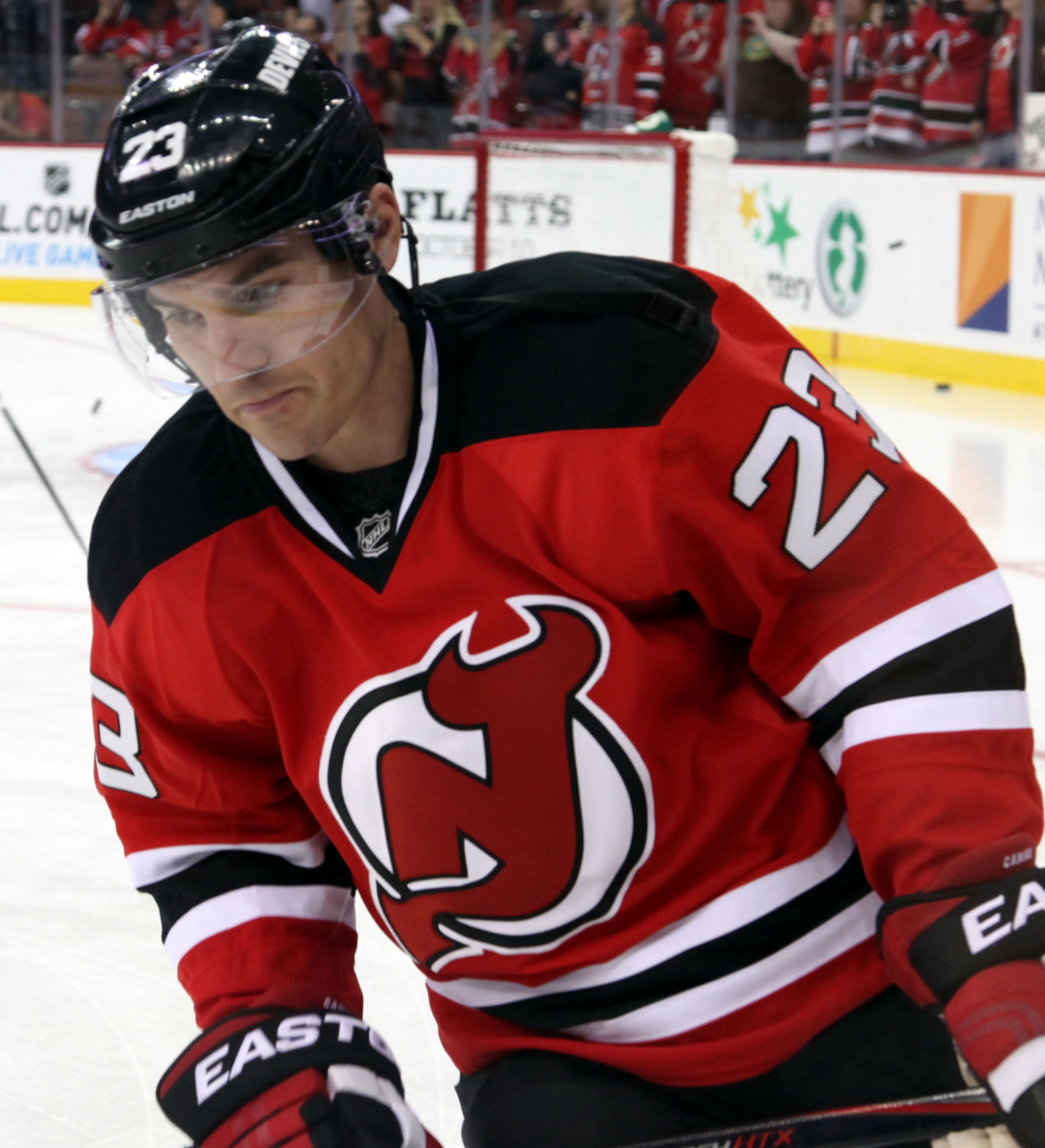
- Cammalleri with the New Jersey Devils in 2014
- Born: June 8, 1982 (age 44) Richmond Hill, Ontario, Canada
- Height: 5 ft 9 in (175 cm)
- Weight: 185 lb (84 kg; 13 st 3 lb)
- Position: Left wing
- Shot: Left
- Played for: Los Angeles Kings; Calgary Flames; Montreal Canadiens; New Jersey Devils; Edmonton Oilers
- National team: Canada
- NHL draft: 49th overall, 2001; Los Angeles Kings
- Playing career: 2002–2018

Michael Anthony Cammalleri (born June 8, 1982) is a Canadian former professional ice hockey player who played 15 seasons in the National Hockey League (NHL) for five different teams. He was selected in the second round, 49th overall, by the Los Angeles Kings at the 2001 NHL entry draft.

Cammalleri made his NHL debut with the Kings in 2002. In September 2007, he scored the first regular season goal ever scored in an NHL game played in Europe. After playing with the Calgary Flames for one season in 2008–09, he joined the Montreal Canadiens, with whom he scored the 20,000th goal in franchise history in 2009 and tied a franchise record for goals in one playoff series in 2010. He returned to the Flames in 2012 following an unusual transaction in which he was traded in the middle of a game. After the expiry of his contract in 2014, Cammalleri signed a five-year contract with the New Jersey Devils, but was bought-out just three years into the deal. In the subsequent free agency period, he signed a one-year contract to return to the Kings, opting for a second tenure with a team for the second time in his career.

Representing Canada internationally on four occasions, Cammalleri won bronze and silver medals at the 2001 and 2002 World Junior Championships respectively. He was named the tournament's best forward in 2002. He won a gold medal at the 2007 Men's World Ice Hockey Championships. An all-star in college and the American Hockey League, Cammalleri played in the "Cold War", an outdoor game that set a then world attendance record in 2001. He has also been recognized for his involvement in charitable efforts supporting children and the military.

== Early life ==
Cammalleri was born in Richmond Hill, Ontario, and was raised there in a secular household (he described his upbringing as "non-denominational"), but his family background is half-Italian and half-Jewish. His father, Leo, is Catholic and of Italian (Sicilian) descent and his mother, Ruth, is Jewish. He has one sister, Melanie. His maternal grandparents, from Poland and Czechoslovakia, were Holocaust survivors. He said, "It's a family of deep-rooted closeness and unity coming from very desperate times. It is who I am as a person."

Cammalleri's best sport as a youth was soccer, while he also played baseball and golf. His passion was hockey, and he played most of his minor ice hockey with the Toronto Red Wings organization of the Greater Toronto Hockey League (GTHL). He played in the 1996 Quebec International Pee-Wee Hockey Tournament with the Toronto Red Wings.

Cammalleri was selected by the Ontario Hockey League (OHL)'s St. Michael's Majors in the OHL Priority Draft, but chose not to play in the OHL in order to preserve his American college eligibility. Instead, he joined the Junior A Bramalea Blues of the Ontario Provincial Junior Hockey League (OPJHL), where he was named the league's rookie of the year as a 15-year-old in 1997–98. He was named an all-star the following season and was selected as the Ontario Hockey Association's top draft prospect after scoring 103 points in 41 games.

At age 15, Cammalleri committed to attend the University of Michigan on a full hockey scholarship. He took an accelerated course schedule and graduated from The Country Day School in King City, Ontario, at age 17. He then moved on to Michigan, where he studied sports management and communications.

== Playing career ==
=== University of Michigan ===
Cammalleri joined the Michigan Wolverines men's ice hockey program in 1999, scoring 13 goals in 39 games as a freshman. He led the team with 29 goals as a sophomore in 2000–01, and was named a first-team Central Collegiate Hockey Association (CCHA) all-star. Michigan reached the 2001 Frozen Four, where it lost the National Collegiate Athletic Association (NCAA) semi-final game to Boston College. He was also voted to the NCAA west second All-American team.

"The game was like playing a game of pond hockey; you could hear the skates and the voices, but it was like being in the middle of a lake in Canada. Then you look up and see 75,000 people and hear roars in the distance. It was like the movie, 'Gladiator,' when (Russell Crowe) looks up and hears 'HURRAHHH.'"

— Cammalleri describes the experience of playing in a football stadium before the largest crowd in history in 2001.

The Los Angeles Kings selected Cammalleri in the second round of the 2001 NHL entry draft, 49th overall. He chose to remain in college, rejoining a much-younger Wolverines team as an alternate captain and expected to be the team's offensive leader. Early in the season, on October 1, 2001, he played in the "Cold War" against Michigan State University, an outdoor game that set a then-world record attendance for a hockey game at 74,554 fans. Though he nearly missed the game due to a hip-flexor injury, Cammalleri figured in all three of Michigan's goals as the game ended in a 3–3 draw.

With 23 goals and 44 points in 29 games, Cammalleri led the Wolverines to the CCHA conference championship in 2001–02. He was named a CCHA second team all-star and an NCAA first team All-American. At the West Regional tournament, Cammalleri was named both an all-star at forward and the most valuable player as he led Michigan back to the Frozen Four. The Wolverines again lost the national semifinal, this time to the University of Minnesota.

=== Los Angeles Kings ===
Cammalleri chose to forgo his senior year of eligibility, signing a contract with the Kings ahead of the 2002–03 NHL season. He attended the Kings' training camp, but failed to make the roster and was assigned to their then-minor league affiliate, the Manchester Monarchs of the American Hockey League (AHL). He scored 14 points in 9 games and earned his first recall to Los Angeles on November 7, 2002. He made his NHL debut the following night against the Ottawa Senators and earned his first point, an assist, in a 3–2 victory. His first goal came one week later, on November 16, against Tommy Salo of the Edmonton Oilers. He was demoted and recalled by the Kings twice more during the season, and appeared in a total of 28 NHL games, scoring 8 points in addition to 20 points in 13 games in the AHL before his season was ended on January 28, 2003, when he suffered a concussion in a game against the San Jose Sharks.

Cammalleri again bounced between the Kings and the Monarchs throughout the 2003–04 season, while a labour dispute in the NHL resulted in his spending the entire 2004–05 season in Manchester. Cammalleri opened the season with 20 goals in his first 22 games en route to a league leading and franchise record setting total of 46. His total of 109 points, also a Monarchs record, was second in the AHL behind Jason Spezza's 117. He was voted a starter in the 2005 AHL All-Star Game, was named to the second All-Star team and received the Willie Marshall Award for leading the league in goals.

Returning to Los Angeles in 2005–06, Cammalleri established himself as an NHL regular, appearing in 80 games with the Kings and leading the team with 26 goals. He improved to 34 goals and 80 points in 2006–07 and was voted the recipient of the Bill Libby Memorial Award as the Kings' most valuable player by the local media. He and the Kings were unable to agree on a new contract following the season. Cammalleri was asking for $6 million per season, while the team offered $2.6 million. The two sides proceeded to salary arbitration, after which Cammalleri was awarded a two-year contract that paid him $3.1 million and $3.6 million for the two seasons, respectively.

The Kings opened the season in London, England, for the first regular season games played in Europe in league history. Cammalleri scored two goals, including the first ever in Europe, in a 4–1 victory over the Anaheim Ducks on September 29, 2007. He opened the season with ten goals in ten games before a protracted offensive slump and rib injury that forced him out of lineup for a month resulted in only nine more goals scored over the remainder of the season.

=== Calgary and Montreal ===
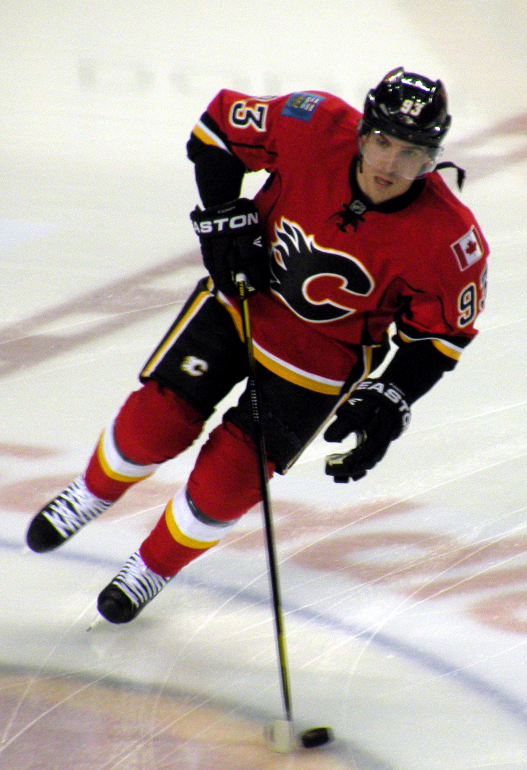
Cammalleri has twice been a member of the Flames.

Cammalleri was involved in trade rumours following his arbitration hearing, which was considered contentious. At the 2008 NHL entry draft held on June 20, he was traded to the Calgary Flames as part of a three-way trade. The Kings received Anaheim's first-round pick, 12th overall, and a second-round pick from Calgary, while the Ducks received Calgary's first-round pick, 17th overall, and Los Angeles' 28th overall selection. Paired with Jarome Iginla, Cammalleri had a career year with the Flames in 2008–09, leading the team with 39 goals and finishing second to Iginla with 82 points. He scored his 100th career NHL goal as part of his first NHL hat-trick early in a 4–3 victory over the Vancouver Canucks on November 27, 2008.

Faced with salary cap constraints, the Flames were unable sign Cammalleri to a new contract following the season. He subsequently left Calgary to sign a five-year, $30 million contract with the Montreal Canadiens. Midway through the 2009–10 season, he scored the 20,000th goal in Montreal franchise history on December 28, 2009, against the Ottawa Senators. A knee injury resulted in Cammalleri missing six weeks of play, but he finished the season with 50 points in 65 games.

Following a series victory over the Washington Capitals in the first round of the 2010 Stanley Cup playoffs, Cammalleri led the Canadiens into the conference finals for the first time since 1993 by tying a franchise record for goals in one series in a victory over the Pittsburgh Penguins. His total of seven tied the mark held jointly by Maurice Richard, Jean Béliveau, Bernie Geoffrion, Guy Lafleur, and Marcel Bonin. Montreal lost their third-round series to the Philadelphia Flyers, but Cammalleri's 13 goals led all playoff scorers despite Montreal failing to reach the final.

Cammalleri began the 2010–11 season on the suspended list after earning a one-game ban for a slashing incident against Nino Niederreiter during a preseason game against the New York Islanders. He then missed a month when he suffered a separated shoulder after being crosschecked into the boards by the Buffalo Sabres' Mike Weber. He returned to action in time to appear in his second outdoor game, the 2011 Heritage Classic against Calgary.

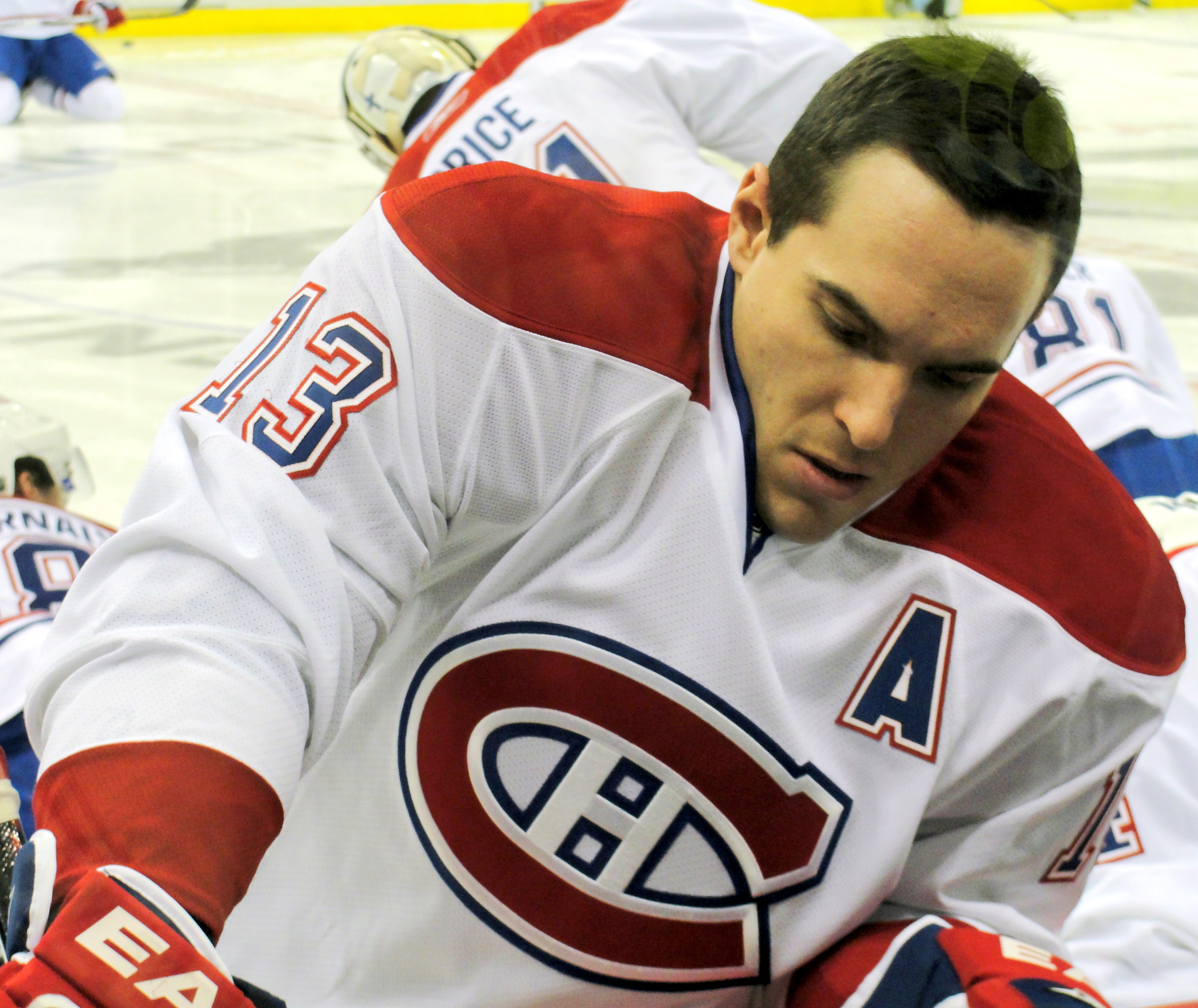
Cammalleri with the Canadiens in March 2011.

Opening the 2011–12 season, Cammalleri scored the first NHL regular season goal at the MTS Centre as Montreal spoiled the debut of the new Winnipeg Jets franchise with a 5–1 victory. However, he had to leave the game after suffering a cut on his leg from the skate blade of teammate Yannick Weber. He struggled throughout the first part of the season, and with the team also losing, was booed by the fans in Montreal during a 3–0 defeat against the St. Louis Blues. Following the game, he expressed his frustration, saying, "I can't accept that we will display a losing attitude as we're doing this year. We prepare for our games like losers. We play like losers. So it's no wonder why we lose." The commentary sparked controversy, while the Montreal Gazette suggested later that the comments, originally spoken in English, were misrepresented after they were translated to French by Réseau des sports then translated back to English.

Two nights later, on January 12, 2012, Cammalleri was pulled from the Montreal lineup during their game against the Boston Bruins after the team completed a trade that saw him return to Calgary (along with the playing rights to goaltender Karri Rämö and a fifth-round pick in the 2012 NHL entry draft) in exchange for Rene Bourque, Patrick Holland, and a second-round pick in the 2013 NHL entry draft. The circumstances of the trade, described as "bizarre" by the media, stunned Cammalleri's former teammates, none of whom could recall a player being traded mid-game before. In his return debut with the Flames, Cammalleri scored one goal in a 4–1 loss to Los Angeles. On February 13, 2013, he scored his 200th career NHL goal (again while completing a hat-trick) in a game against the Dallas Stars.

Cammalleri reached 500 points for his NHL career on April 4, 2014, with a goal in a 2–1 victory over the Florida Panthers.

=== Later career ===
On July 1, 2014, as a free agent, Cammalleri signed a five-year, $25 million contract with the New Jersey Devils. In his first season for the Devils, he was the team's leading scorer with 27 goals. For the 2015–16 season, following the departure of long-time general manager Lou Lamoriello, Cammalleri became the first player in the history of the Devils to wear sweater #13, becoming the first player to wear it since Robin Burns wore it with the Kansas City Scouts. He scored his sixth career NHL hat-trick on November 6, 2016, against the Carolina Hurricanes.

Following the 2016–17 season, and suffering his second successive year in struggling offensively with the Devils, Cammalleri was placed on waivers by the Devils in order to buy-out the remaining two years and $10 million of his contract, which the team accomplished on June 30, 2017.

On July 1, 2017, Cammalleri was promptly signed as a free agent by his original club, the Los Angeles Kings, on a one-year, bonus-laden $1 million contract. In the 2017–18 season, Cammelleri contributed with 3 goals and 7 points in 15 games before he was traded to the Edmonton Oilers in exchange for forward Jussi Jokinen on November 14, 2017. Cammalleri was used in a depth role by the Kings and was even a healthy scratch on two occasions; he was reportedly displeased with his role in the organization prior to the trade. Cammalleri scored his first goal with the Oilers on December 9, 2017, against the Montreal Canadiens.

== International play ==
Medal record

Representing Canada

Ice hockey

World Championships
Gold medal – first place	2007 Moscow	

World Junior Championships
Silver medal – second place	2002 Pardubice	
Bronze medal – third place	2001 Moscow	

Cammalleri made his international debut in 2000, joining the Canadian junior team at the 2001 World Junior Ice Hockey Championships. He had four goals and six points in seven games for Canada, who won the bronze medal. He returned the following year, leading Canada to a silver medal. Cammalleri led the 2002 tournament in scoring with 7 goals and 11 points, and was named the tournament's top forward. He made his debut with the senior team at the 2006 World Championships where he scored one goal and five points in eight games for the fourth place Canadians. He returned for the 2007 tournament held in Moscow, where his seven points helped Canada win the gold medal with a perfect 9–0 record.

== Playing style ==
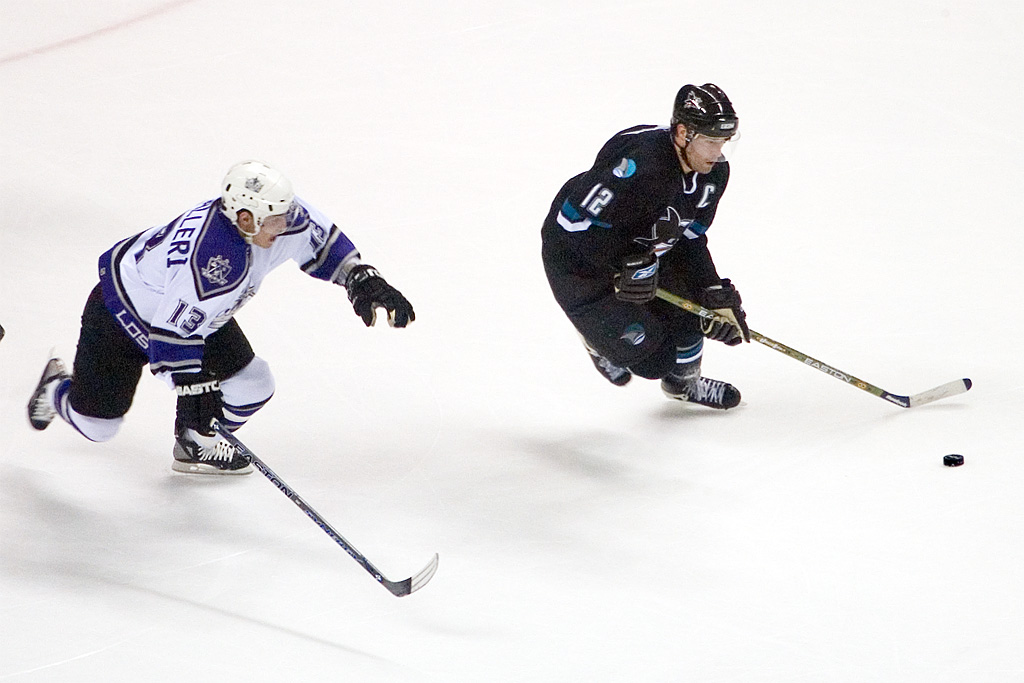
Cammalleri chasing Patrick Marleau in 2006.

Though he stands five feet, nine inches tall, Cammalleri's teammates have argued his small stature is not a drawback. While at Michigan, teammate Craig Murray said that "a lot of people look at his size and they hold it against him, but there's no one stronger out there". On the ice, Cammalleri says he tries to play bigger than his opponents. His coach at Michigan, Red Berenson, agreed. He stated that Cammalleri played like he was "6-foot-4" with the puck and could beat any opponent one-on-one. The Hockey News rates his offensive skills and intelligence on the ice as his greatest strength, but notes that he can be inconsistent away from the puck. He is a natural goal scorer and is capable of playing at either centre or on the wing. Injuries have been a concern for Cammalleri; his time in Montreal were marked by both shoulder and knee problems.

== Personal life ==
Cammalleri and his wife, Jennifer Bernaudo, have a daughter, Chloe, born in 2011. Their second daughter, Mya, was born in December 2014. The couple have been involved in numerous charitable endeavours since Cammalleri joined the NHL. He has focused on children's charities, supporting the Starlight Children's Foundation, World Vision and the SickKids Foundation in Toronto among others. During his time in Montreal, Cammalleri also supported the military via his "Cammy's Heroes" program. He bought tickets for Quebec's soldiers and their families to attend Canadiens games, meeting with them prior to each game. In recognition of his service, the Canadiens named Cammalleri the 2010–11 recipient of the Jean Béliveau Trophy, a team award given annually to the player who "best exemplifies leadership qualities in the community".

Cammalleri's cousin, Jonathan Erlichman, is a coach for the Tampa Bay Rays of Major League Baseball.

While still an active player in 2009 Cammalleri was one of the co-founders of BioSteel Sports Nutrition, which produces nutrition products for athletes; his longtime interest in safe and effective training and nutrition products for athletes grew out of dealing with ulcerative colitis since a diagnosis at age 11.

== Career statistics ==
=== Regular season and playoffs ===
Bold indicates led league

			Regular season					Playoffs
Season	Team	League	GP	G	A	Pts	PIM	GP	G	A	Pts	PIM
1997–98	Bramalea Blues	OPJHL	46	36	52	88	30	—	—	—	—	—
1998–99	Bramalea Blues	OPJHL	41	31	72	103	51	—	—	—	—	—
1999–2000	University of Michigan	CCHA	39	13	13	26	32	—	—	—	—	—
2000–01	University of Michigan	CCHA	42	29	32	61	24	—	—	—	—	—
2001–02	University of Michigan	CCHA	29	23	21	44	28	—	—	—	—	—
2002–03	Manchester Monarchs	AHL	13	5	15	20	12	—	—	—	—	—
2002–03	Los Angeles Kings	NHL	28	5	3	8	22	—	—	—	—	—
2003–04	Los Angeles Kings	NHL	31	9	6	15	20	—	—	—	—	—
2003–04	Manchester Monarchs	AHL	41	20	19	39	28	1	0	1	1	0
2004–05	Manchester Monarchs	AHL	79	46	63	109	60	6	1	5	6	0
2005–06	Los Angeles Kings	NHL	80	26	29	55	50	—	—	—	—	—
2006–07	Los Angeles Kings	NHL	81	34	46	80	48	—	—	—	—	—
2007–08	Los Angeles Kings	NHL	63	19	28	47	30	—	—	—	—	—
2008–09	Calgary Flames	NHL	81	39	43	82	44	6	1	2	3	2
2009–10	Montreal Canadiens	NHL	65	26	24	50	16	19	**13**	6	19	6
2010–11	Montreal Canadiens	NHL	67	19	28	47	33	7	3	7	10	0
2011–12	Montreal Canadiens	NHL	38	9	13	22	10	—	—	—	—	—
2011–12	Calgary Flames	NHL	28	11	8	19	16	—	—	—	—	—
2012–13	Calgary Flames	NHL	44	13	19	32	25	—	—	—	—	—
2013–14	Calgary Flames	NHL	63	26	19	45	26	—	—	—	—	—
2014–15	New Jersey Devils	NHL	68	27	15	42	28	—	—	—	—	—
2015–16	New Jersey Devils	NHL	42	14	24	38	18	—	—	—	—	—
2016–17	New Jersey Devils	NHL	61	10	21	31	21	—	—	—	—	—
2017–18	Los Angeles Kings	NHL	15	3	4	7	4	—	—	—	—	—
2017–18	Edmonton Oilers	NHL	51	4	18	22	14	—	—	—	—	—
NHL totals			906	294	348	642	425	32	17	15	32	8

=== International ===
Year	Team	Event	Result	GP	G	A	Pts	PIM
2001	Canada	WJC	3rd place, bronze medalist(s)	7	4	2	6	2
2002	Canada	WJC	2nd place, silver medalist(s)	7	7	4	11	10
2006	Canada	WC	4th	8	1	4	5	4
2007	Canada	WC	1st place, gold medalist(s)	9	4	3	7	6
Junior totals				14	11	6	17	12
Senior totals				17	5	7	12	10

== Awards and honours ==
Award	Year
Junior
OPJHL Rookie of the Year	1997–98
OPJHL All-Star	1998–99
College
All-CCHA First Team	2000–01
AHCA West Second-Team All-American	2000–01
All-CCHA Second Team	2001–02
AHCA West First-Team All-American	2001–02
CCHA All-Tournament Team	2002
AHL
Second Team All-Star	2004–05
Willie Marshall Award	2004–05
International
IIHF World U20 Championship Tournament All-Star	2002
IIHF World U20 Championship best forward	2002
Los Angeles Kings
Bill Libby Memorial Award	2006–07
Montreal Canadiens
Jean Béliveau Trophy	2010–11

== See also ==
- List of select Jewish ice hockey players

Awards and achievements
Preceded by Ryan Miller	CCHA Most Valuable Player in Tournament; 2002	Succeeded by Jed Ortmeyer
