= Al Montoya =

American ice hockey player (born 1985)

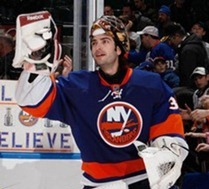
- Montoya with the New York Islanders in 2011
- Born: February 13, 1985 (age 41) Chicago, Illinois, U.S.
- Height: 6 ft 2 in (188 cm)
- Weight: 225 lb (102 kg; 16 st 1 lb)
- Position: Goaltender
- Caught: Left
- Played for: Phoenix Coyotes; New York Islanders; Winnipeg Jets; Florida Panthers; Montreal Canadiens; Edmonton Oilers
- National team: United States
- NHL draft: 6th overall, 2004; New York Rangers
- Playing career: 2005–2019

Álvaro Silva Montoya (born February 13, 1985) is a Cuban-American former professional ice hockey goaltender who played a total of nine seasons in the National Hockey League (NHL) for the Arizona Coyotes, New York Islanders, Winnipeg Jets, Florida Panthers, Montreal Canadiens, and Edmonton Oilers. He was selected in the first round, sixth overall, by the New York Rangers in the 2004 NHL entry draft after a three-year collegiate career with the University of Michigan. Montoya is the first Cuban-American to play in the NHL.

== Playing career ==
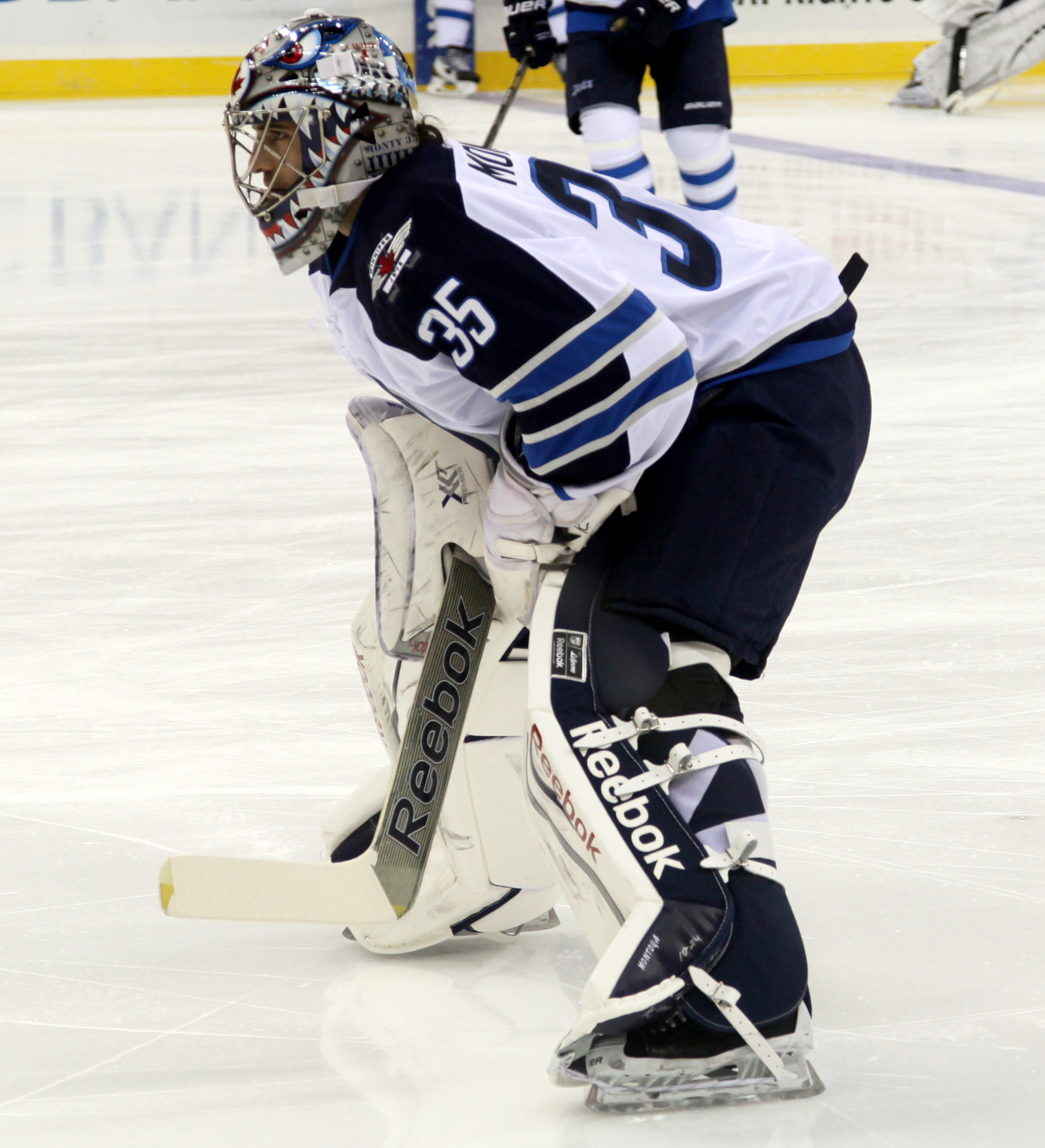
Montoya with the Winnipeg Jets in 2013

Montoya was born in Chicago, Illinois, but grew up in nearby Glenview, Illinois. As a youth, he played in the 1999 Quebec International Pee-Wee Hockey Tournament with the Chicago Young Americans minor ice hockey team. He later played for Loyola Academy, and the Texas Tornado of the North American Hockey League (NAHL).

Montoya spent the 2001–02 season with the U.S. National Team Development Program before attending the University of Michigan and playing for the Wolverines ice hockey team the following year. He enjoyed success at Michigan, especially during his final season in 2004–05, where he posted a record of 30–7–3. Montoya twice represented the United States at the World Junior Ice Hockey Championships, backstopping the team to its first gold medal at the 2004 tournament in Finland; he was named to the tournament All-Star team. The 2005 tournament, hosted by the United States, was a disappointing one for Montoya and the U.S., as they failed to earn a medal, losing to the Czech Republic in the bronze medal game.

=== Early NHL career ===
After being signed by the New York Rangers to a three-year entry-level contract in the summer of 2005, Montoya made his professional debut with the Hartford Wolf Pack of the American Hockey League (AHL), the team with which he spent the majority of the next three seasons. Overall, he posted a 66–34–4 record with the Wolf Pack, along with a 5–5 playoff record.

With the emergence of Henrik Lundqvist as an All-Star caliber goaltender, Montoya became expendable to the Rangers. On February 26, 2008, Montoya was traded to the Phoenix Coyotes, along with Marcel Hossa, in exchange for Fredrik Sjöström, David LeNeveu and Josh Gratton.

After re-signing with the Coyotes on July 2, 2008, Montoya started the 2008–09 season with the San Antonio Rampage, the Coyotes' AHL affiliate. Later that season, on April 1, 2009, Montoya made his NHL debut with the Coyotes, recording a shutout in a 3–0 victory over the Colorado Avalanche. He went on to appear in five games for the Coyotes in 2008–09, posting a 3–1 record. That spring, Montoya was named to the American roster for the 2009 IIHF World Championship in Switzerland. He started one game at the tournament, a 6–2 win over France.

On February 9, 2011, Montoya was traded to the New York Islanders in exchange for a sixth-round draft pick in 2011. With Islanders' goaltenders Rick DiPietro and Kevin Poulin sidelined with injuries, Montoya was provided with an opportunity to play regularly in the NHL for the first time. He went on to play 21 games for the Islanders, posting a 9–5–5 record with a .921 save percentage and one shutout. On March 29, the Islanders re-signed Montoya to a one-year contract extension. Montoya recorded a 9–11–5 record during the 2011–12 season.

Montoya again represented the United States at the 2011 World Championship. He appeared in four games and posted a 2–1 record as the Americans finished a disappointing eighth overall.

=== Winnipeg Jets and Florida Panthers ===
On July 4, 2012, Montoya was signed by the Winnipeg Jets to back-up starter Ondřej Pavelec on a one-year contract for the 2012–13 season, worth $601,000 after being released by the New York Islanders.

On July 1, 2014, Montoya was signed as a free agent by the Florida Panthers to a two-year contract with an annual salary of $1.05 million.

=== Montreal Canadiens and Edmonton Oilers ===
On July 1, 2016, Montoya was signed as a free agent by the Montreal Canadiens to a one-year contract with an annual salary of $950,000. He was the backup to starter Carey Price. During a November 2016 game against the Columbus Blue Jackets, Montoya allowed 10 goals in a 10–0 Canadiens loss, making it the largest margin of loss by Montreal since December 1995. He kept a positive attitude about the embarrassing loss, saying that the setback only made him stronger.

On January 2, 2017, Montoya signed a new two-year contract to last until 2019.

On January 4, 2018, the Canadiens traded Montoya to the Edmonton Oilers in exchange for a conditional fourth-round pick in the 2018 NHL entry draft.

=== Post-playing career ===
On September 9, 2021, Montoya was named director of community outreach for the Dallas Stars.

== Career statistics ==
=== Regular season and playoffs ===
			Regular season									Playoffs
Season	Team	League	GP	W	L	T/OT	MIN	GA	SO	GAA	SV%	GP	W	L	MIN	GA	SO	GAA	SV%
2000–01	Texas Tornado	NAHL	15	10	3	0	780	38	0	2.92	—	1	1	0	60	2	0	2.00	—
2001–02	U.S. National Team Development Program	NAHL	24	6	11	4	1344	79	0	3.53	—	—	—	—	—	—	—	—	—
2002–03	University of Michigan	CCHA	43	30	10	3	2547	99	4	2.33	.911	—	—	—	—	—	—	—	—
2003–04	University of Michigan	CCHA	40	26	12	2	2340	87	6	2.23	.917	—	—	—	—	—	—	—	—
2004–05	University of Michigan	CCHA	40	30	7	3	2359	99	3	2.52	.895	—	—	—	—	—	—	—	—
2005–06	Charlotte Checkers	ECHL	2	1	1	0	123	8	0	3.92	.875	—	—	—	—	—	—	—	—
2005–06	Hartford Wolf Pack	AHL	40	23	9	1	2094	91	2	2.61	.907	5	2	1	257	8	1	1.87	.932
2006–07	Hartford Wolf Pack	AHL	48	27	17	0	2556	98	6	2.30	.914	7	3	4	391	20	1	3.07	.873
2007–08	Hartford Wolf Pack	AHL	31	16	8	3	1704	72	0	2.54	.908	—	—	—	—	—	—	—	—
2007–08	San Antonio Rampage	AHL	14	8	6	0	789	34	1	2.59	.912	1	0	1	59	4	0	4.04	.857
2008–09	San Antonio Rampage	AHL	29	7	17	2	1562	84	0	3.23	.885	—	—	—	—	—	—	—	—
2008–09	Phoenix Coyotes	NHL	5	3	1	0	259	9	1	2.08	.925	—	—	—	—	—	—	—	—
2009–10	San Antonio Rampage	AHL	14	4	7	1	771	34	0	2.65	.904	—	—	—	—	—	—	—	—
2010–11	San Antonio Rampage	AHL	21	11	8	0	1130	60	0	3.19	.891	—	—	—	—	—	—	—	—
2010–11	New York Islanders	NHL	20	9	5	5	1154	46	1	2.39	.921	—	—	—	—	—	—	—	—
2011–12	New York Islanders	NHL	31	9	11	5	1720	89	0	3.10	.893	—	—	—	—	—	—	—	—
2012–13	Winnipeg Jets	NHL	7	3	1	0	351	17	1	2.91	.899	—	—	—	—	—	—	—	—
2013–14	Winnipeg Jets	NHL	28	13	8	3	1541	59	2	2.30	.920	—	—	—	—	—	—	—	—
2014–15	Florida Panthers	NHL	20	6	7	2	977	49	0	3.01	.892	—	—	—	—	—	—	—	—
2015–16	Florida Panthers	NHL	25	12	7	3	1352	49	0	2.18	.919	—	—	—	—	—	—	—	—
2016–17	Montreal Canadiens	NHL	19	8	6	4	1125	50	2	2.67	.912	—	—	—	—	—	—	—	—
2017–18	Montreal Canadiens	NHL	4	2	1	0	223	14	0	3.77	.863	—	—	—	—	—	—	—	—
2017–18	Edmonton Oilers	NHL	9	2	2	2	470	23	0	2.94	.906	—	—	—	—	—	—	—	—
2018–19	Bakersfield Condors	AHL	11	5	6	0	563	29	0	3.09	.879	—	—	—	—	—	—	—	—
NHL totals			168	67	49	24	9,170	405	7	2.65	.908	—	—	—	—	—	—	—	—

=== International ===
Medal record

Men's ice hockey

Representing the United States

World Junior Championships
Gold medal – first place	2004 Finland	

Year	Team	Event	Result	GP	W	L	T	MIN	GA	SO	GAA	SV%
2004	United States	WJC	1st place, gold medalist(s)	6	6	0	0	360	8	2	1.33	.944
2005	United States	WJC	4th	6	3	3	0	393	22	0	3.36	.904
2009	United States	WC	4th	1	1	0	0	60	2	0	2.00	.875
2011	United States	WC	8th	4	2	1	0	208	9	0	2.60	.871
Junior totals				12	9	3	0	753	30	2	2.39	.927
Senior totals				5	3	1	0	268	11	0	2.46	.874

== Awards and honours ==
Award	Year
College
All-CCHA Rookie Team	2002–03
CCHA All-Tournament Team	2003
All-CCHA Second Team	2003–04
AHCA West Second-Team All-American	2003–04

Sporting positions
Preceded by Hugh Jessiman	New York Rangers first-round draft pick 2004	Succeeded by Lauri Korpikoski
