= Craig Kowalski =

American ice hockey player (born 1981)

- Born: January 15, 1981 (age 45) Warren, Michigan, U.S.
- Height: 5 ft 8 in (173 cm)
- Weight: 195 lb (88 kg; 13 st 13 lb)
- Position: Goaltender
- Catches: Left
- Played for: HC Valpellice; Lowell Lock Monsters; Florida Everblades; Syracuse Crunch
- NHL draft: 235th overall, 2000; Carolina Hurricanes
- Playing career: 2004–present

Craig Kowalski (born January 15, 1981) is an American former professional ice hockey goaltender who most recently played for the Nottingham Panthers of the EIHL.

== Playing career ==
Kowalski's Pro career begun on June 25, 2000, when he was selected by the Carolina Hurricanes in 2000 NHL entry draft. He was chosen in the eighth round by the Carolina Hurricanes as their seventh overall pick and 235th overall. More than four years after being drafted, on August 6, 2004, Kowalski signed a multi-year contract with the Hurricanes. He was spare Goaltenders of Carolina during the playoffs. Carolina gave him a Stanley Cup ring. Since he did not play for the Hurricanes, his name could not be included on the Stanley Cup. In 2007, Kowalski was released from a Player Try Out Contract with the Syracuse Crunch of the American Hockey League, and subsequently signed with the Gwinnett Gladiators of the ECHL. During the 2007–2008 ECHL Season, he was named to the All-Star Team, and was chosen as the American Conference's starting Goaltender. Prior to the 2008–2009 ECHL Season, Kowalski was traded to the Phoenix RoadRunners of the ECHL, for Bryan Esner and signed on July 22, 2009 a contract with HC Valpellice. On December 3, 2009 he scored an empty net goal against Sportivi Ghiaccio Pontebba.

On July 8, 2010 Kowalski was revealed as the new starting netminder for Nottingham Panthers in Great Britain's Elite Ice Hockey League. It was to be a historic season, as the Panthers won the challenge cup and playoffs.

On March 28, 2011 it was announced that Kowalski had agreed to return to Nottingham and defend the double for a second season with the Nottingham Panthers in the 2011/12 Elite League campaign where he went on to lead Panthers to winning the Challenge Cup and the Playoffs once again. Kowalski was also selected as part of the EIHL Select who were to play against the NHL's Boston Bruins as well as being selected for the EIHL Second All Star Team with an overall Save Percentage of .923 in 60 games. Kowalski was to play for Nottingham for a further 3 seasons, where he went on to win a further 4 trophies including the long sought after, League Title (12/13).He scored another goal in a pre-season friendly against HC Asiago. Throughout the 2013–14 and 2014–2015 season, Kowalski was plagued with various injuries which saw him sit out most of both seasons. On March 14, 2015 Kowalski broke his collarbone after an accidental collision between him and Former-NHl'er Kevin Westgarth who was playing with the Belfast Giants during the 2014–2015 Season. Kowalski was ruled out for the rest of the season due to this injury. On May 21, 2015 Nottingham Panthers announced that Kowalski wouldn't be returning for the 2015–16 Season, ending a superb 5-year stint with the club. Kowalski has gone down in the history of the Panthers to be one of the best Goaltenders they've ever had.

Awards and achievements
| Preceded by Mike Brown | Perani Cup Champion; 2003–04 | Succeeded by Jordan Sigalet |
