= Simon Mangos =

Canadian ice hockey player

- Born: February 15, 1980 (age 45); Brampton, Ontario, Canada
- Height: 5 ft 10 in (178 cm)
- Weight: 195 lb (88 kg; 13 st 13 lb)
- Position: Defence
- Shoots: Right
- CHL team Former teams: Bossier-Shreveport Mudbugs; Manchester Phoenix
- Playing career: 2000–present

Simon Mangos (born February 15, 1980, in Brampton, Ontario) is a Canadian professional ice hockey player, currently playing for the Bossier-Shreveport Mudbugs. Mangos began his career at Ferris State University, and played regularly at NCAA level for the four years he was there.

After more than 150 appearances for his university, Mangos signed for the Fresno Falcons at ECHL level and in his first season proved to be an astute acquisition, playing in more than 50 games and contributing 20 points to the team's cause. His standard of play was recognised, and he was snapped up to sign for the Texas Wildcatters towards the end of the 2004/05 season.

After ten appearances for the Wildcatters, Mangos decided to move during the off-season. As he had already proven his quality at ECHL standard, he was signed by the Victoria Salmon Kings, who were playing in the ECHL for just their second season. Mangos was a cornerstone of the team and played 72 regular-season games, although the Salmon Kings failed to make the postseason.

In the summer of 2006, Mangos decided to ply his trade in Europe and signed to play for the Manchester Phoenix, a British team playing in the EIHL. In his first season playing British ice hockey, Mangos adapted well and was one of the team's most reliable players at both ends of the ice, totalling more than 40 points in 60 games through his excellent puck control and range of passing.

Mangos was re-signed for the 2007/08 season by player/coach Tony Hand, and was joined by fellow ex-Fresno Falcons players Luke Stauffacher and Brian Passmore. He has also been named alternate captain along with Jeff MacMillan. Despite a second strong season in Manchester, Mangos was released at the end of the season as part of a complete rebuilding of the Phoenix squad. In September 2008, Mangos returned to North America to sign for the Bossier-Shreveport Mudbugs of the Central Hockey League

== Awards and honours ==
Award	Year
All-CCHA Second Team	2000–01
CCHA All-Tournament Team	2003
