= Jonathan Erlichman =

Canadian baseball coach

Tampa Bay Rays – No. 97
- Coach
- Born: Toronto, Ontario

Teams
- As coach: Tampa Bay Rays (2019–present)

Jonathan Erlichman, nicknamed "J-Money", is a Canadian professional baseball coach for the Tampa Bay Rays of Major League Baseball (MLB). He is the first analytics coach in MLB.

== Career ==
Erlichman grew up in the Yonge-Eglinton area in Toronto, Ontario. His only experience as a baseball player was in t-ball at the age of five. At age 13, Erlichman read Moneyball, which cultivated his interest in baseball analytics. He attended the prestigious Upper Canada College for his secondary education, where he further developed his mathematical prowess.

Erlichman earned a bachelor's degree in mathematics from Princeton University in 2012. Erlichman then worked as an intern for the Toronto Blue Jays. He obtained his first fulltime job from the Rays in January 2013 (which is when Andrew Friedman, the then General Manager of the Rays, nicknamed Erlichman “J-Money”) and in December 2016 became their director of analytics. In December 2018, the Rays named Erlichman to their coaching staff as MLB's first process and analytics coach.

Erlichman was a coach for the Rays during their 2020 World Series appearance, was a coach for the American League All Star team in the 2021 MLB All-Star Game, and was the analytics advisor for the Dominican Republic national baseball team during the 2023 World Baseball Classic.

Erlichman joined the Pittsburgh Penguins organization of the NHL in August 2024 after having spent the previous 12 seasons with the Tampa Bay Rays.

== Personal ==
He lives in St. Petersburg, Florida with his wife Casey. The couple has a daughter. His cousin, Michael Cammalleri, played in the National Hockey League for 15 seasons.
