= Mike Stutzel =

Canadian ice hockey player

- Born: February 28, 1979 (age 46) Victoria, British Columbia, Canada
- Height: 6 ft 2 in (188 cm)
- Weight: 216 lb (98 kg; 15 st 6 lb)
- Position: Left wing
- Shot: Left
- Played for: Phoenix Coyotes
- NHL draft: Undrafted
- Playing career: 2003–2012

Mike Stutzel (born February 28, 1979) is a Canadian former professional ice hockey player who played nine games in the National Hockey League (NHL) for the Phoenix Coyotes in 2003–04. He also played 13 games in Finland's SM-liiga for Tappara. Before turning pro, he played hockey at Northern Michigan University in Marquette, Michigan from 1999 - 2003 where he scored 27 regular season goals his senior year. Stutzel was born in Victoria, British Columbia.

== Career statistics ==
=== Regular season and playoffs ===
			Regular season					Playoffs
Season	Team	League	GP	G	A	Pts	PIM	GP	G	A	Pts	PIM
1995–96	Powell River Paper Kings	BCHL	49	6	9	15	36	—	—	—	—	—
1996–97	Powell River Paper Kings	BCHL	46	11	15	26	52	—	—	—	—	—
1997–98	Powell River Kings	BCHL	24	7	5	12	38	—	—	—	—	—
1997–98	Prince George Spruce Kings	BCHL	28	13	22	35	20	—	—	—	—	—
1998–99	Prince George Spruce Kings	BCHL	58	41	51	92	102	8	1	5	6	16
1999–00	Northern Michigan University	CCHA	29	3	6	9	44	—	—	—	—	—
2000–01	Northern Michigan University	CCHA	16	3	5	8	6	—	—	—	—	—
2001–02	Northern Michigan University	CCHA	40	16	17	33	20	—	—	—	—	—
2002–03	Northern Michigan University	CCHA	41	27	15	42	50	—	—	—	—	—
2003–04	Phoenix Coyotes	NHL	9	0	0	0	0	—	—	—	—	—
2003–04	Springfield Falcons	AHL	62	12	12	24	39	—	—	—	—	—
2004–05	Utah Grizzlies	AHL	52	0	2	2	16	—	—	—	—	—
2004–05	Idaho Steelheads	ECHL	14	8	7	15	8	4	1	0	1	6
2005–06	Idaho Steelheads	ECHL	41	11	34	45	100	—	—	—	—	—
2005–06	Tappara	FIN	13	3	1	4	8	6	0	1	1	8
2006–07	Victoria Salmon Kings	ECHL	61	16	36	52	61	5	1	3	4	6
2007–08	Edinburgh Capitals	EIHL	53	18	48	66	54	1	0	0	0	0
2009–10	Fort St. John Flyers	NPHL	—	—	—	—	—	—	—	—	—	—
2010–11	Fort St. John Flyers	NPHL	2	1	3	4	4	—	—	—	—	—
2011–12	Fort St. John Flyers	NPHL	2	0	1	1	4	—	—	—	—	—
AHL totals			114	12	14	16	55	—	—	—	—	—
NHL totals			9	0	0	0	0	—	—	—	—	—
