= Jason Crain =

American physicist

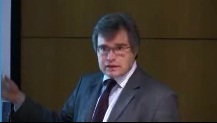
- Crain in 2014
- Born: Jason Crain; August 24, 1966 (age 60); New York City
- Citizenship: American
- Education: Massachusetts Institute of Technology
- Scientific career
- Fields: Applied Physics
- Workplaces: IBM Research; National Physical Laboratory; University of Edinburgh; University of Oxford

Jason Crain (born August 24, 1966) is an American physicist based in the United Kingdom. He was appointed to IBM Research in 2016. He previously held the chair of applied physics at the University of Edinburgh in Scotland and was appointed Director of Research at the UK's National Physical Laboratory (NPL) in London (as of 2015) where he also held the role of Head of Physical Sciences (since 2007). He was also Visiting Professor at the IBM TJ Watson Research Center in New York. His background is in the structure and physics of disordered matter at the molecular scale with a view to applications.

== Early life ==
Born on August 24, 1966, in New York City, he obtained his undergraduate degree from the Massachusetts Institute of Technology in 1989, receiving the 1988 Orloff Prize for Research.

== Career ==
Crain was a research scientist at Fujitsu in Japan (1990) as one of the first interns of the MIT-Japan exchange programme. He obtained his PhD from the University of Edinburgh in 1993. Crain was appointed to a Royal Society of Edinburgh Research Fellowship in 1995, and then appointed to the academic staff at Edinburgh, where he held the Chair of Applied Physics until 2016. He was elected Fellow of the Institute of Physics in 2002. He was then appointed as Head of Physical Sciences and Director of Research at the National Physical Laboratory from 2007 to 2016, at which point he was appointed to IBM Research. He holds appointments as Senior Visiting Fellow at the National Nuclear Laboratory (from 2015) and Visiting Professor at the University of Oxford (from 2018). He has pioneered novel electronic structure methods for materials simulations and led research programs which combine AI, physical modelling and quantum computation.

== Works ==
Crain has over 200 refereed scientific publications with an h-index of 50 according to the Web of Science. These include combinations of experimental and theoretical condensed matter physics combining high-performance computing, generative artificial intelligence and quantum computing. Selected publications are as follows:

- Molecular segregation observed in a concentrated alcohol-water solution S Dixit, J Crain, JL Finney AK Soper Nature (2002) 416:829-832 DOI: 10.1038/416829a
- Structure and elasticity of MgO at high pressure BB Karki, L Stixrude and J. Crain (1997) American Mineralogist82: 51-60
- Elastic instabilities in crystals from ab initio stress-strain relations BB Karki, GJ Ackland and J Crain (1997) Journal of Physics: Condensed Matter 9 Pages: 8579-8589
- Reversible pressure-induced phase transitions in metastable phases of silicon J Crain, GJ Ackland, JR Maclean, and PD Hatton Physical Review B (1994) 50:13043-13046 Published:
- Methanol-water solutions: A bi-percolating liquid mixture L Dougan, SP Bates, R Hargreaves, JP Fox J Crain, JL Finney, V Reat, and AK Soper Journal of Chemical Physics (2994) 121:6456-6462
- Structure and properties of Silicon-XII RO Piltz, JR Maclean, SJ Clark, PD Hatton and J Crain Physical Review B (1995) 52:4072-4085
- Cellular solid behaviour of liquid crystal colloids - 1. Phase separation and morphology VJ Anderson, EM Terentjev, SP Meeker, J Crain, and WCK Poon European Physical Journal E (2001) 4:11-20 DOI: 10.1007/PL00013680
- Nanoscale imaging reveals laterally expanding antimicrobial pores in lipid bilayers PD Rakowska, H Jiang, S Ray, A Pyne, B Lamarre, M Carr, PJ Judge J Crain and M Ryadnov Proceedings of the National Academy of Sciences 110 (22), 8918-8923
- "A Nonlinear Peptide Topology for Synthetic Virions" JE Noble, YW Hsiao, IE Kepiro, E De Santis, A Hoose, C Augagneur, J Crain ACS Nano 18 (43), 29956-29967
- "Nonadiabatic Nuclear–Electron Dynamics: A Quantum Computing Approach" Arseny Kovyrshin, Mårten Skogh, Lars Tornberg, Anders Broo, Stefano Mensa, J Crain J. Phys. Chem. Lett. 14 (31), 7065–7072
- "Accelerating drug target inhibitor discovery with a deep generative foundation model" V Chenthamarakshan, SC Hoffman, CD Owen, P Lukacik, J Crain, P Das Science Advances 9 (25), eadg7865
- "Coarse-grained intermolecular interactions on quantum processors" LW Anderson, M Kiffner, PK Barkoutsos, I Tavernelli, J Crain, D Jaksch Physical Review A 105 (6), 062409
- "Accelerated antimicrobial discovery via deep generative models and molecular dynamics simulations" P Das, T Sercu, K Wadhawan, I Padhi, S Gehrmann, F Cipcigan, J Crain, P Das Nature Biomedical Engineering 5 (6), 613-623
- "Electronic coarse graining: Predictive atomistic modeling of condensed matter" FS Cipcigan, J Crain, VP Sokhan, GJ Martyna Reviews of Modern Physics 91 (2), 025003

== Press coverage ==
His work has been covered on BBC News on HIV research; ChemEurope on "DNA Zippers"; and Science Daily on "Electronically Coarse Grained Water" "Towards the ultimate model of water" and "Squishy transistors"
