= Dwight Helminen =

American professional ice hockey center (born 1983)

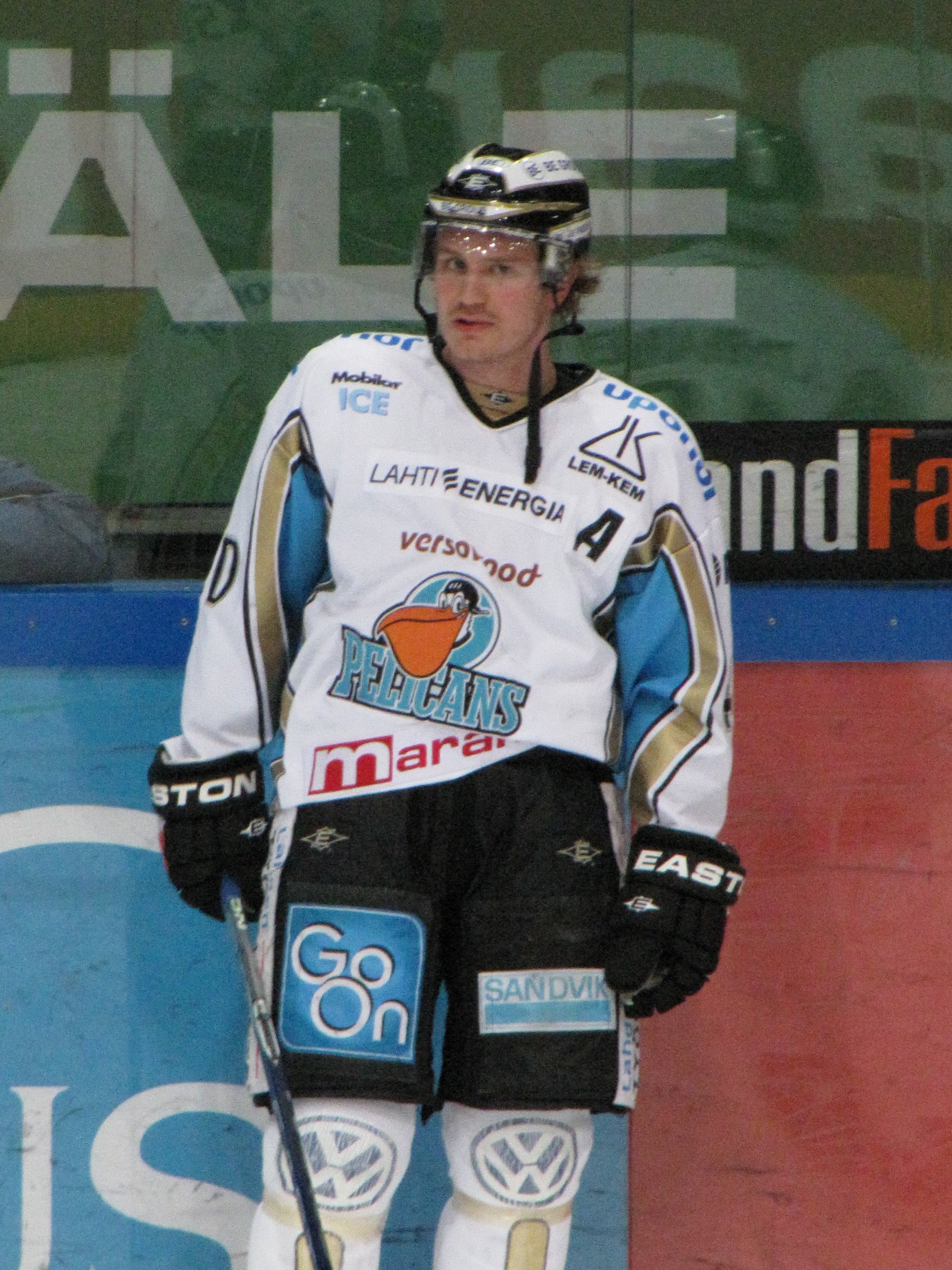
- Born: June 22, 1983 (age 42) Hancock, Michigan, U.S.
- Height: 5 ft 10 in (178 cm)
- Weight: 191 lb (87 kg; 13 st 9 lb)
- Position: Center
- Shot: Left
- ECHL team Former teams: Kalamazoo Wings; JYP; Carolina Hurricanes; San Jose Sharks; Pelicans
- NHL draft: 244th overall, 2002; Edmonton Oilers
- Playing career: 2004–2013

Dwight Edward Helminen (born June 22, 1983) is an American-Finnish former professional ice hockey center who most recently played with the Kalamazoo Wings of the ECHL. His brother Lars plays with Linz EHC of the EBEL.

== Playing career ==
Helminen was born in Hancock, Michigan, and raised in Brighton, Michigan. As a youth, he played in the 1997 Quebec International Pee-Wee Hockey Tournament with the Detroit Compuware minor ice hockey team.

He was drafted 244th overall in the 2002 NHL entry draft by the Edmonton Oilers. Dwight played junior hockey for the U.S. Junior National Team in the United States Hockey League (USHL) and college hockey at the University of Michigan for the Wolverines. On March 3, 2004, the New York Rangers acquired his rights from the Oilers along with a 2004 second round draft pick and Steve Valiquette in exchange for Petr Nedvěd and Jussi Markkanen.

After turning professional, Helminen played for the Charlotte Checkers in the ECHL and the Hartford Wolf Pack in the American Hockey League (AHL), before signing with JYP Jyväskylä in the Finnish SM-liiga in 2007.

Helminen signed a one-year contract with the Carolina Hurricanes on July 3, 2008. He was then assigned to the Hurricanes' affiliate, the Albany River Rats of the AHL. Helminen made his NHL debut in the 2008–09 season after an injury to Brandon Sutter. In his fourth career NHL game, while playing against the Toronto Maple Leafs at home, Helminen scored his first career NHL goal and tallied his first and only career NHL assist. It was the most ice time he had received in the NHL, and his playing time relative to the rest of his NHL career remained consistently high for the next four games, before he was sent back to Albany. He was recalled to the Hurricanes and played four games in early March 2009 as a few Hurricanes forwards missed games, did not play for the Hurricanes' next three games, then returned to the lineup on March 18 to play in each of the Hurricanes' remaining games. This unusual schedule of games, combined with Carolina's late season push towards the 2009 Stanley Cup Playoffs, meant that Helminen played in 13 consecutive wins for the Hurricanes as he avoided a three game winless streak for the team in mid-March. He had played in 23 regular season games by season's end with the Hurricanes, as well as one playoff game.

On July 16, 2009, Helminen signed a one-year contract with the San Jose Sharks. In the 2009–10 season, on February 11, 2010, Helminen scored his first goal with the Sharks, against the Detroit Red Wings. On April 22, 2010, he scored a goal against the Colorado Avalanche in the Sharks' first-round playoff series.

Midway through the 2011–12 season, Helminen left KLH Chomutov of the Czech first division league to return to North America, signing with the Kalamazoo Wings of the ECHL on February 6, 2012.

== Career statistics ==
=== Regular season and playoffs ===
			Regular season					Playoffs
Season	Team	League	GP	G	A	Pts	PIM	GP	G	A	Pts	PIM
1998–99	Compuware Ambassadors	NAHL	32	9	7	16		—	—	—	—	—
1999–2000	US NTDP Juniors	USHL	30	5	7	12	10	—	—	—	—	—
1999–2000	US NTDP U18	NAHL	30	7	10	17	8	—	—	—	—	—
2000–01	US NTDP Juniors	USHL	24	12	7	19	8	—	—	—	—	—
2000–01	US NTDP U18	NAHL	1	0	1	1	2	—	—	—	—	—
2000–01	US NTDP U18	USDP	42	9	36	45	20	—	—	—	—	—
2001–02	University of Michigan	CCHA	40	10	8	18	10	—	—	—	—	—
2002–03	University of Michigan	CCHA	39	17	16	33	34	—	—	—	—	—
2003–04	University of Michigan	CCHA	41	17	11	28	4	—	—	—	—	—
2004–05	Hartford Wolf Pack	AHL	41	2	7	9	10	—	—	—	—	—
2004–05	Charlotte Checkers	ECHL	28	5	16	21	10	15	7	3	10	2
2005–06	Hartford Wolf Pack	AHL	77	32	23	55	40	13	3	5	8	10
2006–07	Hartford Wolf Pack	AHL	80	15	24	39	32	7	1	1	2	2
2007–08	JYP	SM-liiga	52	20	25	45	10	6	3	3	6	0
2008–09	Albany River Rats	AHL	54	15	15	30	26	—	—	—	—	—
2008–09	Carolina Hurricanes	NHL	23	1	1	2	0	1	0	0	0	0
2009–10	Worcester Sharks	AHL	74	12	10	22	16	—	—	—	—	—
2009–10	San Jose Sharks	NHL	4	1	0	1	0	7	1	0	1	4
2010–11	Pelicans	SM-liiga	60	12	16	28	40	—	—	—	—	—
2011–12	Piráti Chomutov	CZE.2	24	4	14	18	6	—	—	—	—	—
2011–12	Kalamazoo Wings	ECHL	20	7	11	18	6	14	5	7	12	2
2012–13	Kalamazoo Wings	ECHL	3	0	1	1	2	—	—	—	—	—
AHL totals			326	76	79	155	124	22	4	6	10	12
NHL totals			27	2	1	3	0	8	1	0	1	4
SM-liiga totals			112	32	41	73	50	6	3	3	6	0

=== International ===
Year	Team	Event	GP	G	A	Pts	PIM
2000	United States	U17	6	0	2	2
2001	United States	WJC18	6	3	5	8	0
2002	United States	WJC	6	1	0	1	2
2003	United States	WJC	7	1	3	4	2
Junior totals			26	5	10	15	4

== Awards and honors ==
Award	Year
CCHA All-Tournament Team	2003

Awards and achievements
Preceded by Jed Ortmeyer	CCHA Best Defensive Forward; 2003–04	Succeeded by Eric Nystrom
