= Terry Harrison (ice hockey) =

Canadian ice hockey right winger

- Born: June 1, 1978 (age 48) Winnipeg, Manitoba, Canada
- Height: 5 ft 11 in (180 cm)
- Weight: 176 lb (80 kg; 12 st 8 lb)
- Position: Right wing
- Shot: Right
- Played for: Milwaukee Admirals; KalPa; Odense Bulldogs; SHC Fassa; Bisons de Neuilly-sur-Marne; Zoetermeer Panthers; HK Partizan
- Playing career: 2003–2011

Terry Harrison (born June 1, 1978) is a Canadian former ice hockey right winger.

== Early life ==
Harrison was born in Winnipeg. He played junior hockey in the Manitoba Junior Hockey League for the Portage Terriers before spending four seasons with the Northern Michigan Wildcats men's ice hockey team.

== Career ==
In 2003, Harrison signed with the Columbia Inferno of the East Coast Hockey League. A year later, he moved to the Rockford IceHogs of the United Hockey League, during which he was called up by the American Hockey League's Milwaukee Admirals where he played nine games.

In 2005, Harrison signed for KalPa of Finland's SM-liiga, but played just nine games before being released. He finished the 2005-06 season in Denmark with the Odense Bulldogs. He returned to the ECHL the following year with the Long Beach Ice Dogs before moving back to Europe to spend the next two seasons in Italy for SHC Fassa and in France for Bisons de Neuilly-sur-Marne.

In 2009, Harrison went back to North American to sign for the Quad City Mallards of the International Hockey League (formerly the United Hockey League) before splitting his final season in the Netherlands with the Zoetermeer Panthers and in Serbia for HK Partizan.
