= Eric Nystrom =

American ice hockey player (born 1983)

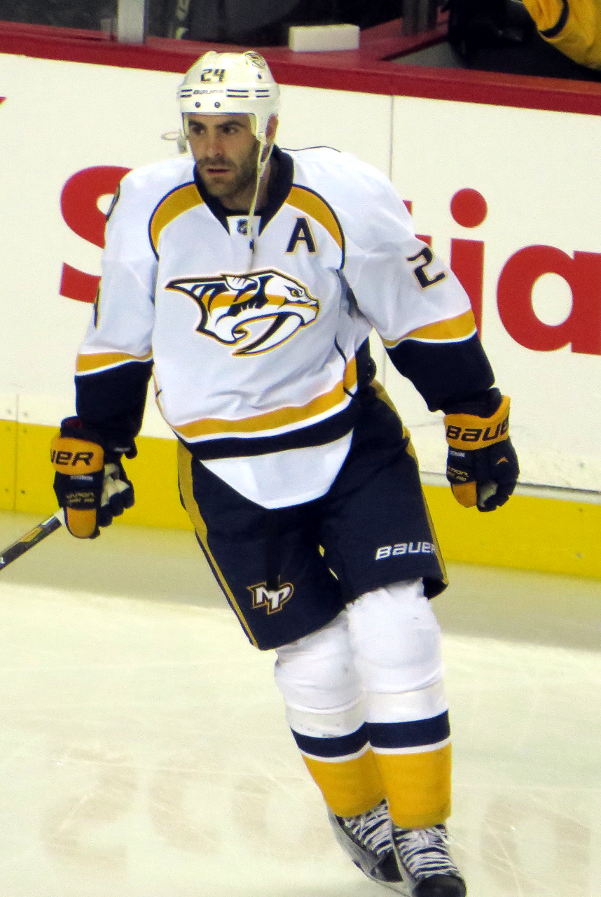
- Nystrom with the Nashville Predators in 2014
- Born: February 14, 1983 (age 43) Syosset, New York, U.S.
- Height: 6 ft 1 in (185 cm)
- Weight: 193 lb (88 kg; 13 st 11 lb)
- Position: Left wing
- Shot: Left
- Played for: Calgary Flames; Minnesota Wild; Dallas Stars; Stavanger Oilers; Nashville Predators
- National team: United States
- NHL draft: 10th overall, 2002; Calgary Flames
- Playing career: 2005–2016

Eric Thore Nystrom (born February 14, 1983) is an American former professional ice hockey player. He was a first round selection of the Calgary Flames, taken 10th overall in the 2002 NHL entry draft, and made his NHL debut with Calgary in 2005. Nystrom has also played for the Minnesota Wild, Dallas Stars and Nashville Predators. He played four seasons of college hockey with the Michigan Wolverines before he turned professional. On four occasions, Nystrom has played with the United States national team, most recently at the 2010 World Championship. He is the son of former NHL player Bob Nystrom.

== Early life ==
Nystrom was born and raised in Syosset, New York, where his father, Bob, was an NHL player for the New York Islanders. Bob, who was himself born in Sweden but grew up in Hinton, Alberta, won four consecutive Stanley Cups between 1980 and 1983. Bob coached his son during his formative years in hockey. Nystrom is Jewish as is his mother. He attended high school at Portledge School in Locust Valley, New York. He has an older sister, Marissa.

Nystrom grew up playing several sports, including soccer and baseball, and only seriously considered a hockey career in his mid-teens. He played in the 1997 Quebec International Pee-Wee Hockey Tournament with the New York Islanders minor ice hockey team.

While Eric was regarded as an NHL prospect himself, his father encouraged him to seek an education first, which the younger Nystrom did upon earning a scholarship to play for the University of Michigan Wolverines in 2000. He spent four years at Michigan where he earned a degree in liberal arts.

== Playing career ==
=== Junior and college ===
Nystrom established a hard-working style similar to his father's, which helped earn him an invite to play with the US National Development Program (USDP). He played 55 games for USDP in the North American Hockey League in 1999–2000, scoring seven goals and 23 points. He split the 2000–01 season with the national under-18 program and the junior team in the United States Hockey League, also representing the United States at the 2001 IIHF World U18 Championships. He later represented the United States at the 2002 and 2003 World Junior Ice Hockey Championships.

He moved onto the University of Michigan, earning a place on the Central Collegiate Hockey Association (CCHA) All-Rookie team in 2002 after scoring 18 goals and 31 points. On the strength of that season, the Calgary Flames selected him with their first pick, 10th overall, at the 2002 NHL entry draft. Before turning professional, Nystrom completed his final three seasons of college eligibility, finishing with 111 points in 160 career games, and serving as the Wolverines' captain in his senior year of 2004–05.

=== Calgary Flames ===
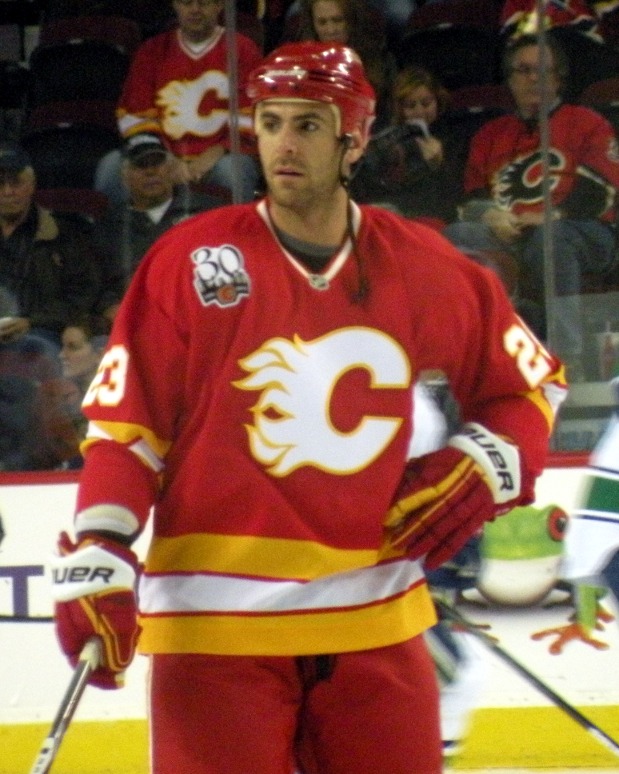
Nystrom with the Flames in 2009

Upon turning professional in 2005, Nystrom was assigned to the Omaha Ak-Sar-Ben Knights of the American Hockey League (AHL). He was recalled by the Flames at the start of the 2005–06 season and made his NHL debut against the Colorado Avalanche on October 10, 2005. He played two games with the Flames before being returned to the AHL to complete the season. Nystrom missed most of the 2006–07 after suffering a tear in his right shoulder during a pre-season game. He attempted to rehab the injury and then play, before opting on surgery. The injury limited Nystrom to just 12 regular season games for Omaha, but he returned in time to play five playoff games for the Knights.

Nystrom split the 2007–08 season between the Calgary and the Quad City Flames. He appeared in 44 regular season games for Calgary, and scored his first NHL goal on October 30, 2007, against the Nashville Predators. He scored a career-high four points, two goals and two assists, in the Flames final game of the regular season, a 7–1 victory over the Vancouver Canucks. Following the season, he signed a two-year contract extension with the Flames.

Nystrom played his first full NHL season with the Flames in 2008–09, playing in 76 games and scoring five goals, three of them game-winning. He added a fourth game-winning goal in the 2009 Stanley Cup Playoffs against the Chicago Blackhawks. He more than doubled his career high in 2009–10, scoring 11 goals despite struggling through a groin injury for a large part of the season. He was invited to play with the American team at the 2010 IIHF World Championships.

=== Minnesota and Dallas ===
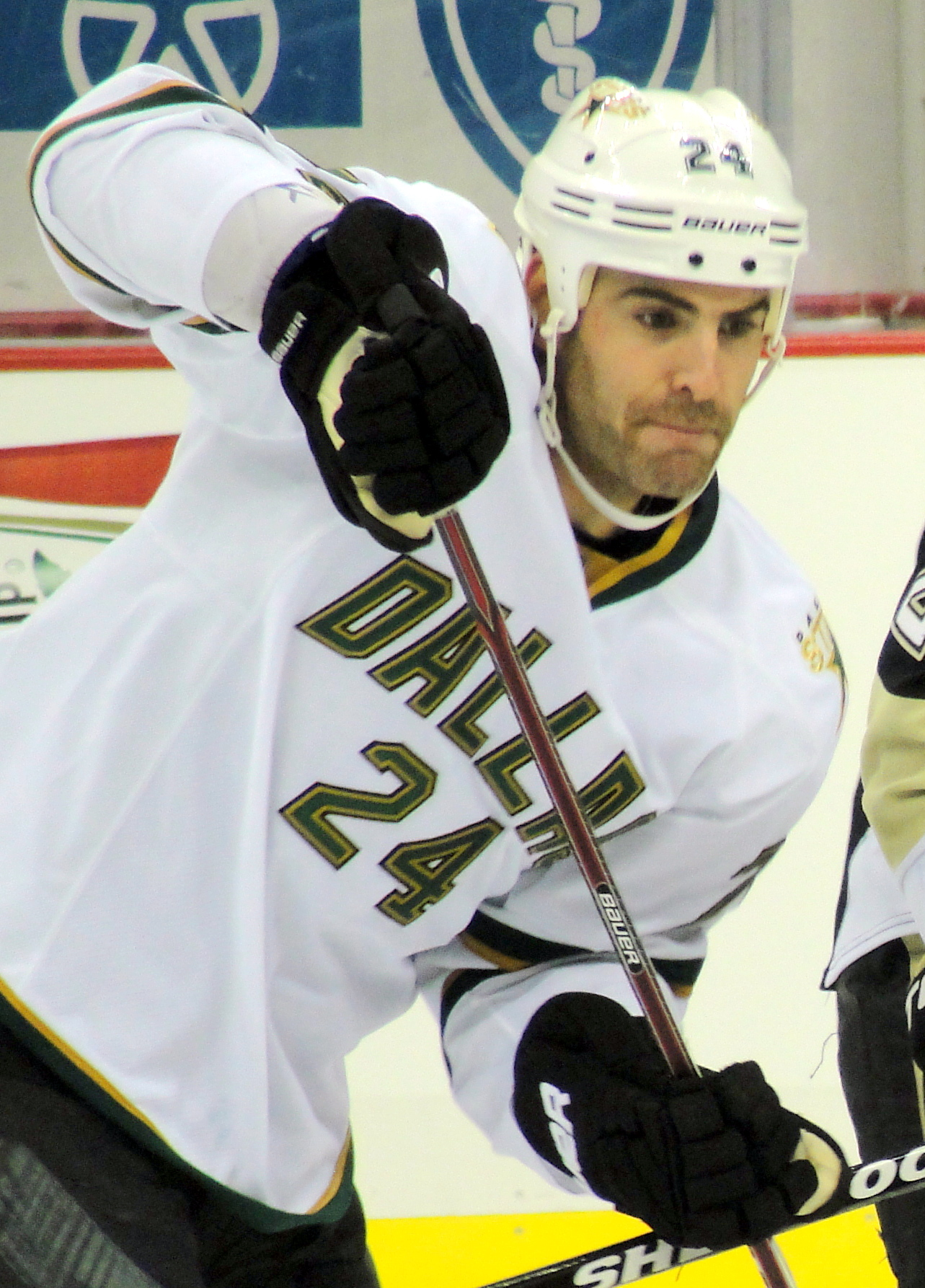
Nystrom with the Dallas Stars

Nystrom chose to leave Calgary as a free agent, signing a three-year, $4.2 million contract with the Minnesota Wild on July 1, 2010. He scored four goals and eight assists in his first season with the Wild, a season which Nystrom admitted was not good, and "snowballed negatively" for him. The 2011–12 season posed early challenges for Nystrom. In a pre-season game against the Edmonton Oilers, his attempt to avoid an icing call resulted in his stick getting caught up in the skates of Edmonton's Taylor Fedun, sending the latter player crashing into the boards at high speed. Fedun suffered a broken leg and the play renewed calls for the NHL to move to no-touch icing to avoid similar incidents in the future. He was waived by Minnesota prior to the season's start, but went unclaimed by any other team and was demoted to the AHL's Houston Aeros, with whom he appeared in one game.

On October 12, 2011, the Wild dealt him to the Dallas Stars. Minnesota had to place him through re-entry waivers first, and while Dallas could have claimed him at that point and been responsible for only half of his $1.4 million salary, they took on his full salary via trade so as to meet the league's minimum payroll rules. Dallas general manager Joe Nieuwendyk praised Nystrom as being an effective penalty killer who would add depth to his team. Though he was anticipated to play in a defensive checking role, Nystrom added an offensive touch for Dallas, scoring 10 goals in his first 21 games with the team. His 12th goal of the season set a new career high, and he finished the year with 16.

Due to the 2012–13 NHL lockout, Nystrom signed with Stavanger Oilers late November and made his debut in the Norwegian GET-ligaen in a match against Vålerenga on December 20. Nystrom had four goals and three assists in his first game. He played only six games with the team, but recorded 14 points. Returning to the NHL once the lockout was resolved, Nystrom scored 11 points in 48 games with Dallas.

=== Nashville Predators ===
Nystrom left the Stars as a free agent following the 2012–13 NHL season and signed a four-year deal with the Nashville Predators worth $10 million. He recorded the first hat trick of his NHL career on January 24, 2014, against the Calgary Flames and finished with a franchise record four goals. The Predators lost the game, however, 5–4 in a shootout.

On June 29, 2016, Nystrom's three-year tenure with the Predators was brought to an end, as he was placed on waivers for the intent to buy out the remaining year of his contract. As a free agent, Nystrom was unable to attain an NHL contract opting to attend the St. Louis Blues training camp on a professional try-out offer on September 8, 2016.

== Off the ice ==
Nystrom has frequently involved himself with charitable endeavors throughout his career. While with Quad City, he performed an on-ice striptease that mimicked the one performed by the character Ned Braden in the movie Slap Shot as part of a team jersey auction. The event raised $30,000. He served as a player ambassador for the Reading... Give it a Shot! program as a member of the Flames and visited local schools as part of the team's campaign to increase literacy among students. Nystrom is active with Garth Brooks' Teammates for Kids Foundation.

== Career statistics ==
=== Regular season and playoffs ===
			Regular season					Playoffs
Season	Team	League	GP	G	A	Pts	PIM	GP	G	A	Pts	PIM
1998–99	New York Apple Core	EJHL	—	—	—	—	—	—	—	—	—	—
1999–00	U.S. NTDP U18	NAHL	55	7	16	23	57	3	0	0	0	0
2000–01	U.S. NTDP Juniors	USHL	23	5	5	10	50	—	—	—	—	—
2000–01	U.S. NTDP U18	USDP	43	10	12	22	52	—	—	—	—	—
2001–02	University of Michigan	CCHA	39	18	12	30	36	—	—	—	—	—
2002–03	University of Michigan	CCHA	39	15	11	26	24	—	—	—	—	—
2003–04	University of Michigan	CCHA	43	10	12	22	50	—	—	—	—	—
2004–05	University of Michigan	CCHA	38	13	19	32	33	—	—	—	—	—
2005–06	Omaha Ak-Sar-Ben Knights	AHL	78	15	18	33	37	—	—	—	—	—
2005–06	Calgary Flames	NHL	2	0	0	0	0	—	—	—	—	—
2006–07	Omaha Ak-Sar-Ben Knights	AHL	12	2	0	2	0	5	0	0	0	2
2007–08	Calgary Flames	NHL	44	3	7	10	48	7	0	0	0	2
2007–08	Quad City Flames	AHL	18	4	3	7	15	—	—	—	—	—
2008–09	Calgary Flames	NHL	76	5	5	10	89	6	2	2	4	0
2009–10	Calgary Flames	NHL	82	11	8	19	54	—	—	—	—	—
2010–11	Minnesota Wild	NHL	82	4	8	12	30	—	—	—	—	—
2011–12	Houston Aeros	AHL	1	0	0	0	0	—	—	—	—	—
2011–12	Dallas Stars	NHL	74	16	5	21	24	—	—	—	—	—
2012–13	Stavanger Oilers	GET	6	4	10	14	6	—	—	—	—	—
2012–13	Dallas Stars	NHL	48	7	4	11	61	—	—	—	—	—
2013–14	Nashville Predators	NHL	79	15	6	21	60	—	—	—	—	—
2014–15	Nashville Predators	NHL	60	7	5	12	15	—	—	—	—	—
2015–16	Nashville Predators	NHL	47	7	0	7	20	1	0	0	0	2
2015–16	Milwaukee Admirals	AHL	2	1	0	1	0	—	—	—	—	—
2016–17	Stavanger Oilers	GET	8	1	3	4	8	14	4	8	12	55
NHL totals			593	75	48	123	401	14	2	2	4	2

=== International ===
Year	Team	Event	Result	GP	G	A	Pts	PIM
2000	United States	U17	4th	6	1	1	2	0
2001	United States	WJC18	6th	6	3	3	6	6
2002	United States	WJC	5th	7	0	0	0	0
2003	United States	WJC	4th	7	1	2	3	2
2010	United States	WC	13th	6	0	0	0	4
Junior totals				26	5	6	11	8
Senior totals				6	0	0	0	4

== Awards and honors ==
Award	Year
All-CCHA Rookie Team	2001–02

== See also ==
- List of select Jewish ice hockey players

Preceded by Dwight Helminen	CCHA Best Defensive Forward; 2004–05	Succeeded by Drew Miller
Preceded by Chuck Kobasew	Calgary Flames first-round draft pick 2002	Succeeded by Dion Phaneuf
