= Mike Brown (ice hockey, born 1981) =

Canadian ice hockey player

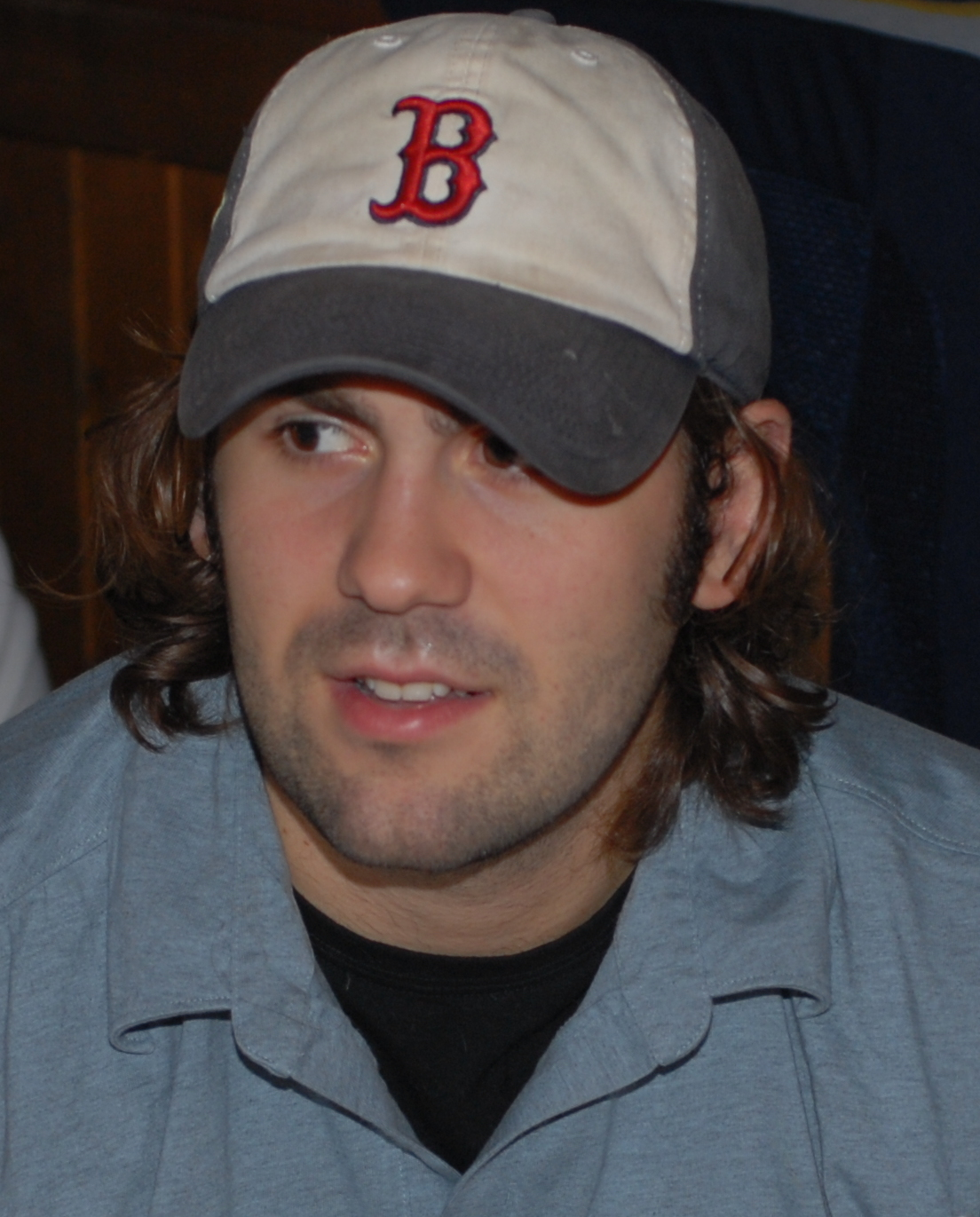
- Mike Brown in 2006
- Born: September 9, 1981 (age 44) Calgary, Alberta, Canada
- Height: 6 ft 0 in (183 cm)
- Weight: 185 lb (84 kg; 13 st 3 lb)
- Position: Goaltender
- Caught: Left
- Played for: Fresno Falcons; Columbia Inferno
- NHL draft: Undrafted
- Playing career: 2005–2006

Mike Brown (born September 9, 1981) is a Canadian former professional ice hockey goaltender.

Brown attended Ferris State University where he played four seasons (2001–2005) of NCAA hockey in the Central Collegiate Hockey Association (CCHA) with the Ferris State Bulldogs. In his freshman season he was named to the 2001–02 CCHA All-Rookie Team. The following season he was again recognized for his outstanding play when he was named to the 2002–03 CCHA All-Conference First Team, and was also selected to the 2002–03 NCAA (West) First All-American Team.

Brown went on to play the 2005–06 season in the ECHL with the Fresno Falcons and Columbia Inferno.

== Awards and honours ==
| Award | Year |
|---|---|
| CCHA All-Rookie Team | 2001–02 |
| CCHA All-Conference First Team | 2002–03 |
| AHCA West First-Team All-American | 2002–03 |
