= 2005 CCHA men's ice hockey tournament =

2005 CCHA Men's ice hockey tournament
- Dates: March 11–19, 2005
- Teams: 12
- Finals site: Joe Louis Arena; Detroit, Michigan
- Champions: Michigan (7th title)
- Winning coach: Red Berenson (7th title)
- MVP: Jeff Tambellini (Michigan)
- CCHA Men's Ice Hockey Tournaments

The 2005 CCHA Men's Ice Hockey Tournament was the 34th CCHA Men's Ice Hockey Tournament. It was played between March 11 and March 19, 2005. Opening round games were played at campus sites, while all "super six" games were played at Joe Louis Arena in Detroit, Michigan. By winning the tournament, Michigan won the Mason Cup and received the Central Collegiate Hockey Association's automatic bid to the 2005 NCAA Division I Men's Ice Hockey Tournament.

== Format ==
The tournament featured four rounds of play. In the first round, the first and twelfth seeds, the second and eleventh seeds, the third seed and tenth seeds, the fourth seed and ninth seeds, the fifth seed and eighth seeds, and the sixth seed and seventh seeds played a best-of-three series, with the two highest-seeded winners advancing to the semifinals and the remaining four winners playing in the quarterfinals. In the quarterfinals, the highest and lowest seeds and second highest and second lowest seeds play a single-game, with the winner advancing to the semifinals. In the semifinals, the highest and lowest seeds and second highest and second lowest seeds play a single-game, with the winner advancing to the championship game and the loser advancing to the third place game. The tournament champion receives an automatic bid to the 2005 NCAA Men's Division I Ice Hockey Tournament.

== Conference standings ==
Note: GP = Games played; W = Wins; L = Losses; T = Ties; PTS = Points; GF = Goals For; GA = Goals Against

2004–05 Central Collegiate Hockey Association standings
	Conference							Overall					
	GP	W	L	T	PTS	GF	GA	GP	W	L	T	GF	GA
#6 Michigan†*	28	23	3	2	48	128	70	42	31	8	3	178	103
#9 Ohio State	28	21	5	2	44	100	62	42	27	11	4	142	96
Northern Michigan	28	17	7	4	38	82	57	40	22	11	7	120	91
Nebraska-Omaha	28	13	11	4	30	101	84	39	19	16	4	133	124
Bowling Green	28	13	12	3	29	92	87	36	16	16	4	117	116
Michigan State	28	12	13	3	27	87	74	41	20	17	4	121	100
Miami	28	11	13	4	26	80	76	38	15	18	5	120	104
Alaska-Fairbanks	28	11	14	3	25	74	99	37	17	16	4	110	122
Lake Superior State	28	8	14	6	22	64	84	38	9	22	7	84	118
Western Michigan	28	8	18	2	18	78	112	37	14	21	2	105	134
Ferris State	28	7	17	4	18	73	97	39	13	22	4	114	131
Notre Dame	28	3	20	5	11	48	105	38	5	27	6	60	138
Championship: Michigan † indicates conference regular season champion * indicates conference tournament champion Final rankings: USA Today/USA Hockey Magazine Top 15 Poll

== Bracket ==
First round March 11–13
1	Michigan	10	1*	—
12	Notre Dame	1	0	—
2	Ohio State	4	0	5*
11	Ferris State	2	1*	4
3	Northern Michigan	1	4	4
10	Western Michigan	2	2	1
4	Nebraska-Omaha	4	4*	—
9	Lake Superior State	3	3	—
5	Bowling Green	3	3	—
8	Alaska-Fairbanks	6	6	—
6	Michigan State	2	5*	—
7	Miami	1	4	—

Quarterfinals; March 17
3	Northern Michigan	3
8	Alaska-Fairbanks	6
4	Nebraska-Omaha	0
6	Michigan State	5

Semifinals; March 18
1	Michigan	3
8	Alaska-Fairbanks	1
2	Ohio State	4
6	Michigan State	1

Championship; March 19
1	Michigan	4
2	Ohio State	2
Third Place
6	Michigan State	2
8	Alaska-Fairbanks	3

Note: * denotes overtime period(s)

=== First round ===
==== (1) Michigan vs. (12) Notre Dame ====
March 11	Michigan	10 – 1	Notre Dame	Yost Ice Arena	Recap
No Scoring		First period	15:38 - Evan Rankin
Eric Nystrom - 01:48; Jeff Tambellini - GW PP - 02:28; Michael Woodford - 06:51; Milan Gajic - 07:41; Brandon Rogers - PP - 14:46; Chad Kolarik - PP - 16:21; Chad Kolarik - PP - 19:53		Second period	No scoring
Brandon Rogers - 05:43; Kevin Porter - 06:49; Milan Gajic - 19:09		Third period	No scoring
Al Montoya ( 10 saves / 11 shots ) / Noah Ruden ( 3 saves / 3 shots ) / Mike Mayhew ( 1 saves / 1 shots )		Goalie stats	Morgan Cey ( 15 saves / 19 shots ) / David Brown (13 saves / 18 shots ) / Rory Walsh ( 4 saves / 5 shots )

March 12	Michigan	1 – 0	OT	Notre Dame	Yost Ice Arena	Recap
No Scoring		First period		No scoring
No scoring		Second period		No scoring
No scoring		Third period		No scoring
Eric Werner - GW - 19:53		First overtime period		No scoring
Al Montoya ( 19 saves / 19 shots )		Goalie stats		Morgan Cey ( 43 saves / 44 shots )

Michigan won series 2–0

==== (2) Ohio State vs. (11) Ferris State ====
March 11	Ohio State	4 – 2	Ferris State	Value City Arena	Recap
Dan Knapp - PP - 05:36; Matt Beaudoin - PP - 14:50		First period	08:47 - PP - Jeff Legue
Rod Pelley - GW - 04:59		Second period	No scoring
Matt Beaudoin - 15:48		Third period	19:35 - PP - Matt York
Dave Caruso ( 21 saves / 23 shots )		Goalie stats	Mike Brown ( 40 saves / 44 shots )

March 12	Ohio State	0 - 1	OT	Ferris State	Value City Arena	Recap
No Scoring		First period		No scoring
No scoring		Second period		No scoring
No scoring		Third period		No scoring
No scoring		First overtime period		01:09 - Zac Pearson
Dave Caruso ( 18 saves / 19 shots )		Goalie stats		Mike Brown ( 36 saves / 36 shots )

March 13	Ohio State	5 – 4	OT	Ferris State	Value City Arena	Recap
No Scoring		First period		04:56 - PP - Derek Nesbitt
Matt Beaudoin - PP - 02:48		Second period		12:58 - PP - Derek Nesbitt
Tom Fritsche - 09:55; Matt Beaudoin - SH - 01:58; Jason DeSantis - 19:10		Third period		03:18 - Matt Stefanishion; 06:18 - Jeff Legue
John Dingle - GW - 04:40		First overtime period		No scoring
Dave Caruso ( 20 saves / 24 shots )		Goalie stats		Mike Brown ( 30 saves / 35 shots )

Ohio State won series 2–1

==== (3) Northern Michigan vs. (10) Western Michigan ====
March 11	Northern Michigan	1 – 2	Western Michigan	Berry Events Center	Recap
Rob Lehtinen - 12:33		First period	19:11 - Nathan Ansell
Brent Walton - GW PP - 04:21		Second period	No scoring
No scoring		Third period	No scoring
Tuomas Tarkki ( 32 saves / 34 shots )		Goalie stats	Daniel Bellissimo ( 23 saves / 24 shots )

March 12	Northern Michigan	4 – 2	Western Michigan	Berry Events Center	Recap
No Scoring		First period	14:50 - Pat Dwyer
No Scoring		Second period	15:56 - Paul Szczechura
Andrew Contois - SH - 02:08; Jamie Milam - PP - 05:20; Dirk Southern - GW - 06:26; Kevin Gardner - EN - 19:35		Third period	No scoring
Tuomas Tarkki ( 29 saves / 31 shots )		Goalie stats	Daniel Bellissimo ( 22 saves / 25 shots )

March 13	Northern Michigan	4 – 1	Western Michigan	Berry Events Center	Recap
Kevin Gardner - SH - 14:09; Tim Hartung - GW - 15:51		First period	No scoring
Pat Bateman - 04:49		Second period	15:11 - PP - Jeff Pierce
Kevin Gardner - 17:21		Third period	No scoring
Tuomas Tarkki ( 29 saves / 30 shots )		Goalie stats	Daniel Bellissimo ( 17 saves / 21 shots )

Northern Michigan won series 2–1

==== (4) Nebraska-Omaha vs. (9) Lake Superior State ====
March 11	Nebraska-Omaha	4 – 3	Lake Superior State	Qwest Center Omaha	Recap
Bill Thomas - PP - 18:46; Dan Hacker - 18:56		First period	No scoring
Brandon Scero - 15:11		Second period	15:42 - PP - Trent Campbell; 17:06 - PP - Ren Fauci
Joe Grimaldi - GW - 19:53		Third period	00:25 - Colin Nicholson
Chris Holt ( 16 saves / 19 shots )		Goalie stats	Jeff Jakaitis ( 31 saves / 35 shots )

March 12	Nebraska-Omaha	4 – 3	OT	Lake Superior State	Qwest Center Omaha	Recap
Brandon Scero - PP - 18:04		First period		07:38 - Colin Nicholson; 08:04 - Jeffrey Rainville
Rob Chappell - 01:18		Second period		No scoring
Brandon Scero - PP - 03:15		Third period		05:02 - Jon Booras
Scott Parse - GW - 05:24		First overtime period		No scoring
Chris Holt ( 27 saves / 30 shots )		Goalie stats		Jeff Jakaitis ( 39 saves / 43 shots )

Nebraska-Omaha won series 2–0

==== (5) Bowling Green vs. (8) Alaska-Fairbanks ====
March 11	Bowling Green	3 – 6	Alaska-Fairbanks	BGSU Ice Arena	Recap
Alex Foster - 06:56		First period	00:05 - Ryan McLeod; 00:13 - Ryan McLeod; 03:19 - Kelly Czuy
No Scoring		Second period	03:34 - GW PP - Jared Sylvestre; 17:03 - Lucas Burnett
Jon Matsumoto - 04:37; Ben Geelan - 06:21		Third period	03:37 - PP - Curtis Fraser
Jordan Sigalet ( 24 saves / 29 shots ) / Jon Horrell ( 8 saves / 9 shots )		Goalie stats	Wylie Rogers ( 28 saves / 31 shots )

March 12	Bowling Green	3 – 6	Alaska-Fairbanks	BGSU Ice Arena	Recap
No Scoring		First period	15:44 - PP - Aaron Lee; 19:08 - Ryan Muspratt
James Unger - 07:50		Second period	16:17 - Kyle Greentree
Mike Nesdill - PP - 02:02; Jon Matsumoto - PP - 12:55		Third period	11:00 - GW - Aaron Lee; 18:58 - Curtis Fraser; 19:40 - EN - Jason Grinevitch
Jordan Sigalet ( 27 saves / 32 shots )		Goalie stats	Wylie Rogers ( 34 saves / 37 shots )

Alaska-Fairbanks won series 2–0

==== (6) Michigan State vs. (7) Miami ====
March 11	Michigan State	2 – 1	Miami	Munn Ice Arena	Recap
No Scoring		First period	08:52 - PP - Nathan Davis
Chad Hontvet - PP - 07:35; Chad Hontvet - GW PP - 13:24		Second period	No scoring
No scoring		Third period	No scoring
Dominic Vicari ( 25 saves / 26 shots )		Goalie stats	Brandon Crawford-West ( 32 saves / 34 shots )

March 12	Michigan State	5 – 4	OT	Miami	Munn Ice Arena	Recap
No Scoring		First period		13:44 - PP - Matt Davis
Bryan Lerg - 16:46; Jim Slater - 19:46		Second period		03:27 - Mitch Ganzak; 18:30 - Marty Guerin
Tom Goebel - 13:25; Colton Fretter - 14:54		Third period		12:44 - Ryan Jones
Colton Fretter - GW PP - 07:45		First overtime period		No scoring
Dominic Vicari ( 34 saves / 38 shots )		Goalie stats		Brandon Crawford-West ( 31 saves / 36 shots )

Michigan State won series 2–0

=== Quarterfinals ===
==== (3) Northern Michigan vs. (8) Alaska-Fairbanks ====
March 17	Northern Michigan	3 – 6	Alaska-Fairbanks	Joe Louis Arena	Recap
Rob Lehtinen - 10:18; Tim Hartung - PP - 12:21		First period	07:15 - PP - Ryan McLeod; 18:17 - PP - Ryan McLeod
Nathan Oystrick - PP - 19:04		Second period	02:18 - Aaron Lee; 11:54 - GW PP - Jason Grinevitch
No Scoring		Third period	08:36 - SH - Nathan Fornataro; 19:58 - EN - Kyle Greentree
Tuomas Tarkki ( 24 saves / 29 shots )		Goalie stats	Wylie Rogers ( 25 saves / 28 shots )

==== (4) Nebraska-Omaha vs. (6) Michigan State ====
March 17	Nebraska-Omaha	0 – 5	Michigan State	Joe Louis Arena	Recap
No Scoring		First period	03:28 - GW PP - Colton Fretter; 10:31 - PP - Jim McKenzie
No Scoring		Second period	06:17 - Tom Goebel; 11:12 - Daniel Vukovic
No Scoring		Third period	18:42 - EN - Chris Mueller
Chris Holt ( 37 saves / 41 shots )		Goalie stats	Dominic Vicari ( 33 saves / 33 shots )

=== Semifinals ===
==== (1) Michigan vs. (8) Alaska-Fairbanks ====
March 18	Michigan	3 – 1	Alaska-Fairbanks	Joe Louis Arena	Recap
No Scoring		First period	No scoring
Brandon Kaleniecki - 12:13; Jeff Tambellini - GW - 19:41		Second period	No scoring
Chad Kolarik - PP - 05:37		Third period	02:43 - Ryan McLeod
Al Montoya ( 12 saves / 13 shots )		Goalie stats	Wylie Rogers ( 43 saves / 46 shots )

==== (2) Ohio State vs. (6) Michigan State ====
March 18	Ohio State	4 – 1	Michigan State	Joe Louis Arena	Recap
Andrew Schembri - PP - 08:25		First period	17:44 - Ash Goldie
Sean Collins - GW - 07:38		Second period	No scoring
Jason DeSantis - 07:35; Tom Fritsche - PP - 15:59		Third period	No scoring
Dave Caruso ( 24 saves / 25 shots )		Goalie stats	Dominic Vicari ( 35 saves / 39 shots )

=== Third Place ===
==== (6) Michigan State vs. (8) Alaska-Fairbanks ====
March 19	Michigan State	2 – 3	Alaska-Fairbanks	Joe Louis Arena	Recap
No Scoring		First period	14:19 - SH - Jared Sylvestre
Tom Goebel - 02:15		Second period	01:08 - PP - Adam Powell; 15:10 - GW - Aaron Lee
Adam Nightingale - 11:54		Third period	No scoring
Dominic Vicari ( 23 saves / 26 shots )		Goalie stats	Wylie Rogers ( 36 saves / 38 shots )

=== Championship ===
==== (1) Michigan vs. (2) Ohio State ====
March 19	Michigan	4 – 2	Ohio State	Joe Louis Arena	Recap
Milan Gajic - PP - 02:54		First period	No scoring
Milan Gajic - PP - 06:46		Second period	05:32 - Tom Fritsche; 06:57 - JB Bittner
Jeff Tambellini - GW - 05:27; Jason Ryznar - EN - 19:59		Third period	No scoring
Al Montoya ( 27 saves / 29 shots )		Goalie stats	Dave Caruso ( 34 saves / 37 shots )

== Tournament awards ==
=== All-Tournament Team ===
- F Ryan McLeod (Alaska-Fairbanks)
- F Tom Fritsche (Ohio State)
- F Jeff Tambellini* (Michigan)
- D Sean Collins (Ohio State)
- D Brandon Rogers (Michigan)
- G Wylie Rogers (Alaska-Fairbanks)

* Most Valuable Player(s)

=== Three Stars of the Tournament ===
- 3 Wylie Rogers (Alaska-Fairbanks)
- 2 Tom Fritsche (Ohio State)
- 1 Jeff Tambellini (Michigan)
