= 2004 CCHA men's ice hockey tournament =

Sports tournament

2004 CCHA Men's ice hockey tournament
- Dates: March 12–20, 2004
- Teams: 12
- Finals site: Joe Louis Arena; Detroit, Michigan
- Champions: Ohio State (2nd title)
- Winning coach: John Markell (1st title)
- MVP: Paul Caponigri (Ohio State)
- CCHA Men's Ice Hockey Tournaments

The 2004 CCHA Men's Ice Hockey Tournament was the 33rd CCHA Men's Ice Hockey Tournament in conference history. It was played between March 12 and March 20, 2004. First round games were played at campus sites, while all 'super six' games were played at Joe Louis Arena in Detroit, Michigan. By winning the tournament, Ohio State won the Mason Cup and received the Central Collegiate Hockey Association's automatic bid to the 2004 NCAA Division I Men's Ice Hockey Tournament.

== Format ==
The tournament featured four rounds of play. In the First Round, the first and twelfth seeds, the second and eleventh seeds, the third and tenth seeds, the fourth and ninth seeds, the fifth and eighth seeds and the sixth and seventh seeds played a best-of-three series. All six victors in the first round advance as the newly minted 'Super Six' and play only single-elimination for the duration of the tournament. The top two ranked winners receive byes into the semifinals while the four other teams play in the quarterfinals to determine the other qualifiers. In the semifinals, the remaining highest and lowest seeds and second highest and second lowest seeds play a single-game, with the winners advancing to the finals. The tournament champion receives an automatic bid to the 2004 NCAA Men's Division I Ice Hockey Tournament.

== Conference standings ==
Note: GP = Games played; W = Wins; L = Losses; T = Ties; PTS = Points; GF = Goals For; GA = Goals Against

2003–04 Central Collegiate Hockey Association standings
	Conference							Overall					
	GP	W	L	T	PTS	GF	GA	GP	W	L	T	GF	GA
#7 Michigan†	28	18	8	2	38	101	66	43	27	14	2	151	104
#10 Miami	28	17	8	3	37	99	74	41	23	14	4	137	106
#14 Michigan State	28	17	9	2	36	91	62	42	23	17	2	136	105
#9 Ohio State*	28	16	12	0	32	89	70	42	26	16	0	134	106
#12 Notre Dame	28	14	11	3	31	84	71	39	20	15	4	108	99
Alaska-Fairbanks	28	14	13	1	29	92	92	36	16	19	1	117	127
Northern Michigan	28	13	13	2	28	66	79	41	21	16	4	105	113
Western Michigan	28	12	13	3	27	87	101	39	17	18	4	123	136
Bowling Green	28	9	13	6	24	69	83	38	11	18	9	92	112
Ferris State	28	10	17	1	21	71	97	38	15	20	3	108	126
Lake Superior State	28	7	16	5	19	60	83	36	9	20	7	72	102
Nebraska-Omaha	28	5	19	4	14	60	91	39	8	26	5	91	135
Championship: Ohio State † indicates conference regular season champion * indicates conference tournament champion Final rankings: USA Today/American Hockey Magazine Poll Top 15 Poll

== Bracket ==
Teams are reseeded after the first round and quarterfinals

First Round; March 12–14
1	Michigan	2	1	5
12	Nebraska-Omaha	0	3	2
2	Miami	4	2*	–
11	Lake Superior State	0	1	–
3	Michigan State	6	5	–
10	Ferris State	4	3	–
4	Ohio State	3	5	–
9	Bowling Green	2	2	–
5	Notre Dame	4	0	5*
8	Western Michigan	2	4	4
6	Alaska-Fairbanks	1	2	–
7	Northern Michigan	3	3	–

Quarterfinals; March 18
3	Michigan State	1
7	Northern Michigan	2
4	Ohio State	6*
5	Notre Dame	5

Semifinals; March 19
1	Michigan	5
7	Northern Michigan	1
2	Miami	3
4	Ohio State	4*

Championship; March 20
1	Michigan	2
4	Ohio State	4
Third Place
2	Miami	4
7	Northern Michigan	0

Note: * denotes overtime period(s)

=== First round ===
==== (1) Michigan vs. (12) Nebraska-Omaha ====
March 12	Michigan	2 – 0	Nebraska-Omaha	Yost Ice Arena	Recap
(Tambellini) David Rohlfs - GW PP - 12:06		First period	No scoring
(Nystrom, Hunwick) Dwight Helminen - 15:38		Second period	No scoring
No scoring		Third period	No scoring
( 16 saves / 16 shots ) Al Montoya		Goalie stats	Chris Holt ( 40 saves / 42 shots )

March 13	Michigan	1 – 3	Nebraska-Omaha	Yost Ice Arena	Recap
(Nystrom, Dest) Mike Brown - 02:55		First period	14:00 - PP - Scott Parse (Gabinet, Wong)
No scoring		Second period	09:40 - GW - Andrew Wong (Betts)
No scoring		Third period	13:55 - Anthony Adams (Nikiforuk)
( 24 saves / 27 shots ) Al Montoya		Goalie stats	Chris Holt ( 29 saves / 30 shots )

March 14	Michigan	5 – 2	Nebraska-Omaha	Yost Ice Arena	Recap
(Hunwick, Moss) Jeff Tambellini - 12:52		First period	16:12 - PP - Alex Nikiforuk (Lefley)
No scoring		Second period	18:29 - Scott Parse (Betts, Wong)
(Brown) Dwight Helminen - 06:55 (Ebbett) Eric Werner - GW - 07:54 (Nystrom, Rohlfs) Jeff Tambellini - PP - 09:38; Dwight Helminen - EN - 18:31		Third period	No scoring
( 21 saves / 23 shots ) Al Montoya		Goalie stats	Chris Holt ( 30 saves / 34 shots )

Michigan won series 2–1

==== (2) Miami vs. (11) Lake Superior State ====
March 12	Miami	4 – 0	Lake Superior State	Goggin Ice Arena	Recap
(Edwardson, Dennis) Matt Christie - GW - 05:29		First period	No scoring
(Christie, Dennis) Greg Hogeboom - 07:59 (Edwardson, Greene) Marty Guerin - PP - 08:3359 (Edwardson, Greene) Todd Grant - 19:09		Second period	No scoring
No scoring		Third period	No scoring
( 9 saves / 9 shots ) Brandon Crawford-West		Goalie stats	Jeff Jakaitis ( 26 saves / 30 shots ) / Matt Violin ( 16 saves / 16 shots )

March 13	Miami	2 – 1	OT	Lake Superior State	Goggin Ice Arena	Recap
(Edwardson, Guerin) Matt Christie - 05:47		First period		No scoring
No scoring		Second period		09:03 - Colin Nicholson (McJannett, Adamek)
No scoring		Third period		No scoring
(Smith) Todd Grant - GW - 12:05		First overtime period		No scoring
( 22 saves / 23 shots ) Brandon Crawford-West		Goalie stats		Jeff Jakaitis ( 40 saves / 42 shots )

Miami won series 2–0

==== (3) Michigan State vs. (10) Ferris State ====
March 12	Michigan State	6 – 4	Ferris State	Munn Ice Arena	Recap
(Estrada, Potter) Adam Nightingale - PP - 06:56 (Markusen, Snavely) Drew Miller - PP - 19:57		First period	No scoring
(Goebel, Lalonde) Jim Slater - 18:02		Second period	12:06 - Joe Van Culin (Thomson); 12:19 - Simon Mangos (Smith)
(Snavely, Lalonde) Tom Goebel - 02:48 (Goebel, Lalonde) Jim Slater - GW - 08:24 (Estrada, Vicari) Colton Fretter - 18:43		Third period	03:48 - Jeff Legue (Rallo, Flamminio); 06:06 - Greg Rallo (Nesbitt)
( 20 saves / 24 shots ) Dominic Vicari		Goalie stats	Mike Brown ( 34 saves / 40 shots )

March 13	Michigan State	5 – 3	Ferris State	Munn Ice Arena	Recap
No Scoring		First period	No scoring
(Miller) Ethan Graham - 12:06		Second period	00:37 - PP - Simon Mangos (Legue, Nesbitt); 01:38 - SH - Jeff Legue; 05:34 - Carter Thomson (Mangos)
Ethan Graham - 02:57 (Snavely, Slater) Mike Lalonde - 06:52 (Falardeau, Markusen) Drew Miller - GW - 12:08; Lee Falardeau - EN - 19:41		Third period	No scoring
( 22 saves / 25 shots ) Dominic Vicari		Goalie stats	Mike Brown ( 35 saves / 39 shots )

Michigan State won series 2–0

==== (4) Ohio State vs. (9) Bowling Green ====
March 12	Ohio State	3 – 2	Bowling Green	Value City Arena	Recap
(Steckel, Andress) Matt Beaudoin - 09:04; Paul Caponigri - 19:20		First period	No scoring
(Steckel, Collins) Bryce Anderson - GW - 04:04		Second period	No scoring
No scoring		Third period	03:51 - Mark Wires (Pilkington, Bieksa); 05:02 - Ryan Barnett (Escobedo, Rogosheske)
( 28 saves / 30 shots ) Mike Betz		Goalie stats	Jordan Sigalet ( 37 saves / 40 shots )

March 13	Ohio State	5 – 2	Bowling Green	Value City Arena	Recap
(Pelley, Bencharski) Sean Collins - 07:54 (Bittner, Andress) Dave Steckel - 16:42		First period	No scoring
No scoring		Second period	15:27 - Mike Falk (Pilkington)
(Collins, Beaudoin) Dave Steckel - GW - 06:44; Scott May - EN SH - 15:44; Doug Andress - EN - 19:07		Third period	16:07 - PP - Steve Brudzewski (Minnabarriet, Meloche)
( 13 saves / 15 shots ) Mike Betz / ( 2 saves / 2 shots ) Kelly Holowaty		Goalie stats	Jordan Sigalet ( 40 saves / 43 shots )

Ohio State won series 2–0

==== (5) Notre Dame vs. (8) Western Michigan ====
March 12	Notre Dame	4 – 2	Western Michigan	Joyce Center	Recap
(Gill) Brett Lebda - 18:24		First period	No scoring
(O'Neill, Lebda) Matt Amado - 04:25		Second period	10:02 - Paul Davies (Yantzi, Bellissimo)
Josh Sciba - GW PP - 01:13; T.J. Jindra - EN SH - 19:30		Third period	17:06 - Brent Walton (Drake, Lattery)
( 40 saves / 42 shots ) Morgan Cey		Goalie stats	Scott Foster ( 29 saves / 32 shots )

March 13	Notre Dame	0 – 4	Western Michigan	Joyce Center	Recap
No Scoring		First period	No scoring
No scoring		Second period	06:15 - GW - Jeremy Cheyne (Bellissimo, McNamara); 18:50 - Dana Lattery (Bellissimo)
No scoring		Third period	12:32 - Dana Lattery (Davies); 19:39 - Jeff Campbell (Lattery, Walton)
( 27 saves / 31 shots ) Morgan Cey		Goalie stats	Eric Marvin ( 30 saves / 30 shots )

March 14	Notre Dame	5 – 4	OT	Western Michigan	Joyce Center	Recap
No Scoring		First period		17:57 - Dana Lattery (Bellissimo, Yantzi)
(Globke, Lebda) Aaron Gill - 01:42 (Walsh, Trick) Tim Wallace - 13:56 (McLean, O'Neill) Tim Wallace - 17:08		Second period		08:14 - PP - Jeremy Cheyne (Drake, Walton)
(Walsh, Lebda) Rob Globke - 03:28		Third period		9:24 - PP - Vince Bellissimo (Jarmuth, Walton); 11:31 - Patrick Dwyer
(Wallace, McLean) Jason Paige - GW - 12:35		First overtime period		No scoring
( 33 saves / 37 shots ) David Brown		Goalie stats		Eric Marvin ( 21 saves / 26 shots )

Notre Dame won series 2–1

==== (6) Alaska-Fairbanks vs. (7) Northern Michigan ====
March 12	Alaska-Fairbanks	1 – 3	Northern Michigan	Carlson Center	Recap
No Scoring		First period	13:01 - Pat Murphy (Selden, Hunter)
No scoring		Second period	12:50 - GW - Jamie Milam (Southern); 15:34 - Dave Bonk (Murphy, Hunter)
(Hickey, Fraser) Cory Rask - 04:05		Third period	No scoring
( 23 saves / 26 shots ) Preston McKay		Goalie stats	Tuomas Tarkki ( 39 saves / 40 shots )

March 13	Alaska-Fairbanks	2 – 3	Northern Michigan	Carlson Center	Recap
No Scoring		First period	15:40 - Pat Bateman (Olver, Lehtinen)
(Fraser) Cory Rask - 11:05 (Larranaga) Ryan Campbell - PP - 15:34		Second period	15:58 - Nathan Oystrick (Gardner)
No scoring		Third period	03:44 - GW - Justin Kinnunen (Southern, Waugh)
( 28 saves / 31 shots ) Keith Bartusch		Goalie stats	Tuomas Tarkki ( 29 saves / 31 shots )

Northern Michigan won series 2–0

=== Quarterfinals ===
==== (3) Michigan State vs. (7) Northern Michigan ====
March 18	Michigan State	1 – 2	Northern Michigan	Joe Louis Arena	Recap
No Scoring		First period	01:11 - Alex Sawruk (Gardner); 06:05 - GW - Kevin Gardner (Miller, Swanson)
(Goldie) Brock Radunske - 02:44		Second period	No scoring
No scoring		Third period	No scoring
( 15 saves / 17 shots ) Dominic Vicari		Goalie stats	Tuomas Tarkki ( 35 saves / 36 shots )

==== (4) Ohio State vs. (5) Notre Dame ====
March 18	Ohio State	6 – 5	OT	Notre Dame	Joe Louis Arena	Recap
(Beaudoin, Steckel) Rod Pelley - PP - 13:59 (Beaudoin, Andress) Dave Steckel - PP - 17:30		First period		05:32 - Rob Globke; 06:56 - Aaron Gill; 18:40 - PP - Aaron Gill (Globke, Komadoski)
(Waddell) Scott May - 00:16 (Strachan, Welsh) Matt Beaudoin - PP - 16:28		Second period		04:43 - Aaron Gill (Globke); 10:14 - Mike Walsh (Gill, Globke)
(Andress) Matt Beaudoin - 17:34		Third period		No scoring
(Andress, Schembri) Tyson Strachan - GW - 09:49		First overtime period		No scoring
( 14 saves / 19 shots ) Mike Betz / ( 15 saves / 15 shots ) Dave Caruso		Goalie stats		David Brown ( 43 saves / 49 shots )

=== Semifinals ===
==== (1) Michigan vs. (7) Northern Michigan ====
March 19	Michigan	5 – 1	Northern Michigan	Joe Louis Arena	Recap
No Scoring		First period	No scoring
(Werner, Gajic) Brandon Kaleniecki - 10:14		Second period	No scoring
(Hensick, Gajic) Brandon Kaleniecki - GW PP - 00:28 (Hensick, Rohlfs) Jeff Tambellini - 08:42 (Ryznar) David Moss - 09:23 (Tambellini, Rohlfs) T. J. Hensick - 11:15		Third period	18:26 - EA - Dave Bonk (Hunter, Selden)
( 19 saves / 20 shots ) Al Montoya		Goalie stats	Tuomas Tarkki ( 29 saves / 34 shots )

==== (2) Miami vs. (4) Ohio State ====
March 19	Miami	3 – 4	OT	Ohio State	Joe Louis Arena	Recap
Mike Kompon - PP - 16:36		First period		No scoring
(Michael, Greene) Todd Grant - 15:51		Second period		06:36 - Rod Pelley (Caponigri)
(Hogeboom) Mike Kompon - 09:46		Third period		05:28 - Paul Caponigri (Bittner, Pelley); 12:54 - Dan Knapp
No scoring		First overtime period		00:23 - GW - JB Bittner (Caponigri, Pelley)
( 24 saves / 28 shots ) Brandon Crawford-West		Goalie stats		Dave Caruso ( 18 saves / 21 shots )

=== Third Place ===
==== (2) Miami vs. (7) Northern Michigan ====
March 20	Miami	4 – 0	Northern Michigan	Joe Louis Arena	Recap
(Edwardson, Christie) Andy Greene - GW - 03:11 (Greene) Andy Nelson - 08:06		First period	No scoring
(Hustead) Todd Grant - 08:27 (Christie, Kompon) Greg Hogeboom - 15:52		Second period	No scoring
No scoring		Third period	No scoring
( 24 saves / 24 shots ) Brandon Crawford-West		Goalie stats	Tuomas Tarkki ( 37 saves / 41 shots ) / Craig Kowalski ( 0 saves / 0 shots )

=== Championship ===
==== (1) Michigan vs. (4) Ohio State ====
March 20	Michigan	2 – 4	Ohio State	Joe Louis Arena	Recap
No Scoring		First period	No scoring
No scoring		Second period	02:50 - Paul Caponigri (Pelley); 04:04 - Doug Andress (Beaudoin); 19:27 - GW PP - Dan Knapp (Andress, Caponigri)
(Nartens, Ebbett) Milan Gajic - 10:40 (Tambellini, Hensick) Brandon Rogers - 13:06		Third period	19:29 - EN - Doug Andress
( 28 saves / 31 shots ) Al Montoya		Goalie stats	Dave Caruso ( 26 saves / 28 shots )

== Tournament awards ==
=== All-Tournament Team ===
- F Brandon Kaleniecki (Michigan)
- F Rod Pelley (Ohio State)
- F Paul Caponigri* (Ohio State)
- D Andy Greene (Miami)
- D Doug Andress (Ohio State)
- G Dave Caruso (Ohio State)

* Most Valuable Player(s)
