= 2004–05 Victoria Salmon Kings season =

2004-05 Victoria Salmon Kings
- League: 28th ECHL
- Division: 8th West
- Conference: 16th National
- 2004-05 record: 15–52–5
- Home record: 8–26–2
- Road record: 7–26–3
- Goals for: 178
- Goals against: 298

Team information
- General manager: Bryan Maxwell
- Coach: Bryan Maxwell
- Assistant coach: Greg Batters
- Captain: Brad Dexter
- Arena: Bear Mountain Arena
- Average attendance: 2,289

Team leaders
- Goals: Ryan Wade (19)
- Assists: Ryan Wade (31)
- Points: Ryan Wade (50)
- Penalty minutes: Blue Bennefield (195)
- Plus/minus: Kevin Hoffman/Scott Borders (+2)
- Wins: Jason Stone (5)
- Goals against average: Dan Blackburn (3.54)

The 2004–05 Victoria Salmon Kings season is the Salmon Kings' inaugural season in the ECHL. While the Victoria region has had a long and distinguished hockey history - the Victoria Cougars won the Stanley Cup in 1925 - the region was the largest Canadian region without either professional or Major-Junior hockey when the WHL Victoria Cougars (a team with no connection to the aforementioned Cougars) moved to Prince George in 1994. This was a crippling blow to Victoria hockey fans, whose highest-level remaining local team was the Tier II Junior 'A' Victoria Salsa.

By this time, it had become evident that the 50-year-old Victoria Memorial Arena, seating only 4,000 for hockey, would have to be replaced if Victoria expected to be able to attract a new hockey club. After several years of discussion, the construction of a new arena was approved by Victoria voters in a 2002 referendum, with one key condition being that its construction was dependent on Victoria securing a WHL team. When the private-sector partner, RG Properties, was unable to secure a WHL club, the company bought the rights to the defunct ECHL Baton Rouge Kingfish, formerly the Erie Panthers, a charter member of the ECHL, and announced that Victoria's new team would be named the Salmon Kings.

It became clear as the 2004–05 ECHL season approached that Victoria's new arena, now called the Save-on-Foods Memorial Centre, was not going to be ready in time for the season. In response, the ECHL scheduled the Salmon Kings to begin their inaugural season with an unheard-of 14 game road trip. This was not enough time for the arena to be completed, and in the summer of 2004 the Salmon Kings were forced to secure ice time in the Bear Mountain Arena in the suburban community of Colwood, which had been constructed with the needs of the junior 'A' Victoria Salsa and the Victoria Shamrocks box lacrosse club in mind.

Despite all this, the Salmon Kings took to the ice in their first regular-season game on October 22, 2004, in Bakersfield, California, against the Bakersfield Condors. Former University of Alberta player Ryan Wade scored the first goal in Salmon Kings history. They lost this game 7-2; the Salmon Kings would struggle during their 14-game road trip, only winning 3 games, losing 10 games in regulation and one in a shootout. Their first victory came at the expense of the Fresno Falcons on October 24, which the Salmon Kings won by a convincing 5-0 margin. David Brumby, the Kings' starting goaltender at the time, turned away 37 shots for the shutout.

As the NHL lockout progressed, Dale Purinton and Dan Blackburn of the New York Rangers and Mark Smith of the San Jose Sharks played for the Salmon Kings. Purinton, an enforcer, was suspended twice by the league, the first for a career-ending check into the boards of Condors player Krzysztof Wieckowski, and the second for returning to the ice to fight after being ejected during a bench-clearing brawl involving the Kings and the Falcons. After the latter suspension, Purinton was suspended indefinitely by the Salmon Kings and did not play again that season.

After the grueling 14-game road trip which lasted for over a month, the Salmon Kings finally played their first home game on December 5, 2004, at Bear Mountain Arena. The Salmon Kings lost this game 4-3 in overtime. They would continue to struggle during their first season, going only 15-52-5 over 72 games; notably, they set an ECHL record for a continuous winless streak, going 0-18-2 between December 31, 2004 and February 4, 2005.

The few positives for the team in their inaugural season was Ryan Wade who would be known by fans as "Mr. Salmon King" led the team in scoring (19g-31a) and team captain, Brad Dexter was voted a starter on the National Conference's All-Star Team.

== Standings ==
=== Division standings ===
West Division	GP	W	L	T	Pts	GF	GA
Alaska Aces (z)	72	45	19	8	98	233	187
Long Beach Ice Dogs	72	43	20	9	95	220	181
Idaho Steelheads	72	42	23	7	91	223	183
Bakersfield Condors	72	40	22	10	90	232	205
Fresno Falcons	72	39	25	8	86	204	217
San Diego Gulls	72	35	29	8	78	206	222
Las Vegas Wranglers	72	31	33	8	70	201	199
Victoria Salmon Kings	72	15	52	5	35	178	298

=== Conference standings ===
National Conference	GP	W	L	T	PTS	GF	GA
Alaska Aces (y)	72	45	19	8	98	233	187
Reading Royals (y)	72	43	22	7	93	220	161
Long Beach Ice Dogs	72	43	20	9	95	220	181
Trenton Titans	72	42	21	9	93	220	161
Atlantic City Boardwalk Bullies	72	42	22	8	92	205	189
Idaho Steelheads	72	42	23	7	91	223	183
Bakersfield Condors	72	40	22	10	90	232	205
Toledo Storm	72	41	26	5	87	203	194
Fresno Falcons	72	39	25	8	86	204	217
Peoria Rivermen	72	38	26	8	84	213	177
Wheeling Nailers	72	38	29	5	81	171	173
San Diego Gulls	72	35	29	8	78	206	222
Las Vegas Wranglers	72	31	33	8	70	201	199
Johnstown Chiefs	72	22	36	14	58	191	258
Dayton Bombers	72	23	40	9	55	175	225
Victoria Salmon Kings	72	15	52	5	35	178	298

== Schedule and results ==
=== Regular season ===
2004–05 Game log

October: 1–2–0 (Home: 0–0–0; Road: 1–2–0)
#	Date	Visitor	Score	Home	OT	Decision	Attendance	Record	Pts
1	October 22	Victoria	2–7	Bakersfield		Brumby	4,419	0–1–0	0
2	October 23	Victoria	1–2	Bakersfield		Brumby	5,986	0–2–0	0
3	October 24	Victoria	5–0	Fresno		Brumby	3,003	1–2–0	2

November: 2–9–1 (Home: 0–0–0; Road: 2–9–1)
#	Date	Visitor	Score	Home	OT	Decision	Attendance	Record	Pts
4	November 5	Victoria	4–1	Idaho		Brumby	4,026	2–2–0	4
5	November 6	Victoria	2–6	Idaho		Brumby	4,437	2–3–0	4
6	November 10	Victoria	1–2	Long Beach		Stone	1,599	2–4–0	4
7	November 12	Victoria	2–5	Las Vegas		Brumby	4,367	2–5–0	4
8	November 13	Victoria	4–6	Fresno		Stone	4,870	2–6–0	4
9	November 17	Victoria	3–7	Alaska		Brumby	4,065	2–7–0	4
10	November 20	Victoria	2–5	Alaska		Brumby	6,345	2–8–0	4
11	November 21	Victoria	4–1	Alaska		Stone	3,502	3–8–0	6
12	November 25	Victoria	2–4	Fresno		Stone	3,629	3–9–0	6
13	November 26	Victoria	2–5	Fresno		Stone	4,178	3–10–0	6
14	November 27	Victoria	2–3	Bakersfield	SO	Stone	8,204	3–10–1	7

December: 4–4–2 (Home: 4–4–2; Road: 0–0–0)
#	Date	Visitor	Score	Home	OT	Decision	Attendance	Record	Pts
15	December 5	Bakersfield	4–3	Victoria	OT	Stone	2,750	3–10–2	8
16	December 7	Bakersfield	2–5	Victoria		Stone	1,653	4–10–2	10
17	December 8	Bakersfield	6–8	Victoria		Stone	2,123	5–10–2	12
18	December 10	Mississippi	1–5	Victoria		Stone	2,056	6–10–2	14
19	December 11	Mississippi	4–3	Victoria	OT	Stone	2,144	6–10–3	15
20	December 13	Mississippi	4–2	Victoria		Stone	2,124	6–11–3	15
21	December 17	San Diego	2–1	Victoria		Stone	2,227	6–12–3	15
22	December 18	San Diego	5–4	Victoria		Stone	2,283	6–13–3	15
23	December 20	San Diego	2–3	Victoria		Stone	2,750	7–13–3	17
24	December 31	Long Beach	4–3	Victoria		Stone	2,750	7–14–3	17

January: 0–15–2 (Home: 0–9–0; Road: 0–6–2)
#	Date	Visitor	Score	Home	OT	Decision	Attendance	Record	Pts
25	January 1	Long Beach	3–2	Victoria		Stone	2,444	7–15–3	17
26	January 2	Long Beach	5–1	Victoria		Stone	2,409	7–16–3	17
27	January 4	Alaska	6–3	Victoria		Stone	2,218	7–17–3	17
28	January 5	Alaska	10–3	Victoria		Stone	2,552	7–18–3	17
29	January 7	Victoria	1–2	Alaska		Stone	3,935	7–19–3	17
30	January 8	Victoria	2–8	Alaska		Stone	4,303	7–20–3	17
31	January 12	Victoria	2–6	Long Beach		Stone	1,395	7–21–3	17
32	January 14	Victoria	2–3	Las Vegas	SO	Shields	4,961	7–21–4	18
33	January 15	Victoria	1–4	Long Beach		Shields	4,497	7–22–4	18
34	January 16	Victoria	2–4	Long Beach		Stone	2,011	7–23–4	18
35	January 18	Long Beach	5–2	Victoria		Shields	1,862	7–24–4	18
36	January 19	Long Beach	3–1	Victoria		Stone	2,038	7–25–4	18
37	January 21	Alaska	5–1	Victoria		Stone	2,597	7–26–4	18
38	January 22	Alaska	3–0	Victoria		Shields	2,931	7–27–4	18
39	January 23	Alaska	5–2	Victoria		Stone	2,484	7–28–4	18
40	January 29	Victoria	1–2	Las Vegas	SO	Stone	7,773	7–28–5	19
41	January 31	Victoria	1–4	Las Vegas		Stone	5,920	7–29–5	19

February: 3–11–0 (Home: 3–9–0; Road: 0–2–0)
#	Date	Visitor	Score	Home	OT	Decision	Attendance	Record	Pts
42	February 2	Fresno	7–3	Victoria		Shields	2,209	7–30–5	19
43	February 4	Fresno	3–2	Victoria		Blackburn	2,360	7–31–5	19
44	February 5	Fresno	4–5	Victoria	SO	Blackburn	2,611	8–31–5	21
45	February 7	Idaho	3–1	Victoria		Blackburn	2,014	8–32–5	21
46	February 9	Idaho	2–1	Victoria		Blackburn	2,147	8–33–5	21
47	February 15	Fresno	1–2	Victoria	SO	Blackburn	1,956	9–33–5	23
48	February 16	Fresno	4–0	Victoria		Stone	2,157	9–34–5	23
49	February 18	Victoria	3–12	Idaho		Blackburn	4,564	9–35–5	23
50	February 19	Victoria	2–4	Idaho		Blackburn	5,403	9–36–5	23
51	February 22	San Diego	2–5	Victoria		Blackburn	1,910	10–36–5	25
52	February 23	San Diego	4–1	Victoria		Blackburn	2,140	10–37–5	25
53	February 25	Las Vegas	4–3	Victoria		Blackburn	2,412	10–38–5	25
54	February 26	Las Vegas	4–3	Victoria		Blackburn	2,627	10–39–5	25
55	February 28	Las Vegas	5–2	Victoria		Blackburn	1,960	10–40–5	25

March: 4–9–0 (Home: 1–4–0; Road: 3–5–0)
#	Date	Visitor	Score	Home	OT	Decision	Attendance	Record	Pts
56	March 4	Bakersfield	7–3	Victoria		Muntain	2,422	10–41–5	25
57	March 5	Bakersfield	4–1	Victoria		McCaig	2,490	10–42–5	25
58	March 9	Idaho	5–4	Victoria		McCaig	2,122	10–43–5	25
59	March 10	Idaho	2–3	Victoria	OT	Muntain	1,894	11–43–5	27
60	March 12	Idaho	8–2	Victoria		Stone	2,605	11–44–5	27
61	March 15	Victoria	1–7	Florida		McCaig	7,082	11–45–5	27
62	March 17	Victoria	5–3	Texas		McCaig	1,825	12–45–5	29
63	March 19	Victoria	7–5	Louisiana		McCaig	2,190	13–45–5	31
64	March 20	Victoria	1–2	Louisiana		McCaig	2,514	13–46–5	31
65	March 22	Victoria	1–3	Pensacola		McCaig	3,880	13–47–5	31
66	March 23	Victoria	1–2	Mississippi		Muntain	2,743	13–48–5	31
67	March 25	Victoria	4–3	Florida		Muntain	7,293	14–48–5	33
68	March 26	Victoria	2–5	Florida		Muntain	7,016	14–49–5	33

April: 1–3–0 (Home: 1–3–0; Road: 0–0–0)
#	Date	Visitor	Score	Home	OT	Decision	Attendance	Record	Pts
69	April 1	Victoria	1–4	Las Vegas		McCaig	4,938	14–50–5	33
70	April 2	Victoria	1–5	Long Beach		Muntain	5,009	14–51–5	33
71	April 8	Victoria	2–3	San Diego		McCaig	5,094	14–52–5	33
72	April 9	Victoria	6–5	San Diego	OT	Muntain	10,773	15–52–5	35

Legend: Win (2 points) Loss (0 points) Overtime/shootout loss (1 point)

== Player stats ==
=== Skaters ===
Note: GP = Games played; G = Goals; A = Assists; Pts = Points; +/- = Plus/minus; PIM = Penalty minutes

Regular season

Player	GP	G	A	Pts	+/-	PIM
Ryan Wade	69	19	31	50	-29	98
Brad Dexter	49	7	28	35	-27	36
Seth Leonard	63	13	14	27	-21	14
Ryan Finnerty	52	13	13	26	-19	165
Mike Barrie	30	5	18	23	-28	42
Rob Voltera	41	15	7	22	-10	81
Jason Hegberg	56	10	12	22	-22	89
Blue Bennefield	39	8	13	21	0	195
Chris Corrinet	37	9	11	20	-31	66
Ryan Watson	33	12	7	19	-19	34
Scott Turner ^{†}	18	10	7	17	-2	16
Alexei Glukhov	32	5	12	17	-13	12
Nathan Forster	53	5	11	16	-32	73
Mark Smith	20	6	9	15	-13	41
Adam Campbell	40	3	12	15	-30	78
Mike Josephson	45	4	9	13	-19	79
Dale Purinton	25	3	9	12	-4	192
Jeff Williams	25	6	5	11	-11	4
David Neale	32	3	7	10	-7	19
Kurtis Dulle	17	2	6	8	-3	8
Jim Gattolliat	43	2	4	6	-21	100
Aaron Plumb	26	0	5	5	-8	60
Peter Trumbley	33	0	5	5	-3	15
Jan Sochor ^{†}	4	3	1	4	-1	0
Jeremy Cheyne	12	1	3	4	-7	6
Ryan Esselmont	8	0	4	4	-8	4
Scott Borders ^{†}	3	1	1	2	+2	4
Dennis Mullen	9	1	1	2	-3	46
Trent Brandvold	7	0	2	2	-5	6
Brandon Elliott	13	0	2	2	-2	41
Craig Zubersky	17	0	2	2	-11	11
Mike Ikeda	2	1	0	1	+1	0
Robert Busch	3	1	0	1	+1	2
Rob MacGregor	9	1	0	1	-1	4
Tomas Micka ^{†}	6	0	1	1	-3	10
Craig Strain	7	0	1	1	-4	6
Kristjan Jefkins	1	0	0	0	0	0
Kevin Hoffman	2	0	0	0	+2	0
Casey Bartzen	2	0	0	0	-2	0
Rob Simnor	3	0	0	0	0	4
Greg Keith ^{†}	4	0	0	0	-3	2
Geoff Rollins	5	0	0	0	-6	2
Cole Byers	11	0	0	0	-8	37

=== Goaltenders ===
Note: GP = Games played; TOI = Time on ice (minutes); W = Wins; L = Losses; T = Ties; GA = Goals against; GAA= Goals against average; Sv% = Save percentage; SO= Shutouts

Regular season

Player	GP	TOI	W	L	T	GA	GAA	Sv%	SO
Dean Whitney	1	18	0	0	0	1	3.21	.938	0
Dan Blackburn	12	695	3	9	0	41	3.54	.892	0
Jason Stone	38	1967	5	22	4	125	3.81	.878	0
Jamie McCaig	11	547	2	7	0	36	3.94	.875	0
Kelly Shields ^{†‡}	6	302	0	4	1	21	4.17	.878	0
Robert Muntain	8	447	3	4	0	33	4.42	.879	0
David Brumby	8	332	2	6	0	28	5.05	.856	1
Grant Sjerven	1	14	0	0	0	5	20.16	.667	0

^{†}Denotes player spent time with another team before joining Victoria. Stats reflect time with the Salmon Kings only.
^{‡}Denotes player no longer with the team. Stats reflect time with Salmon Kings only.
