= Josh Gratton =

Canadian ice hockey player

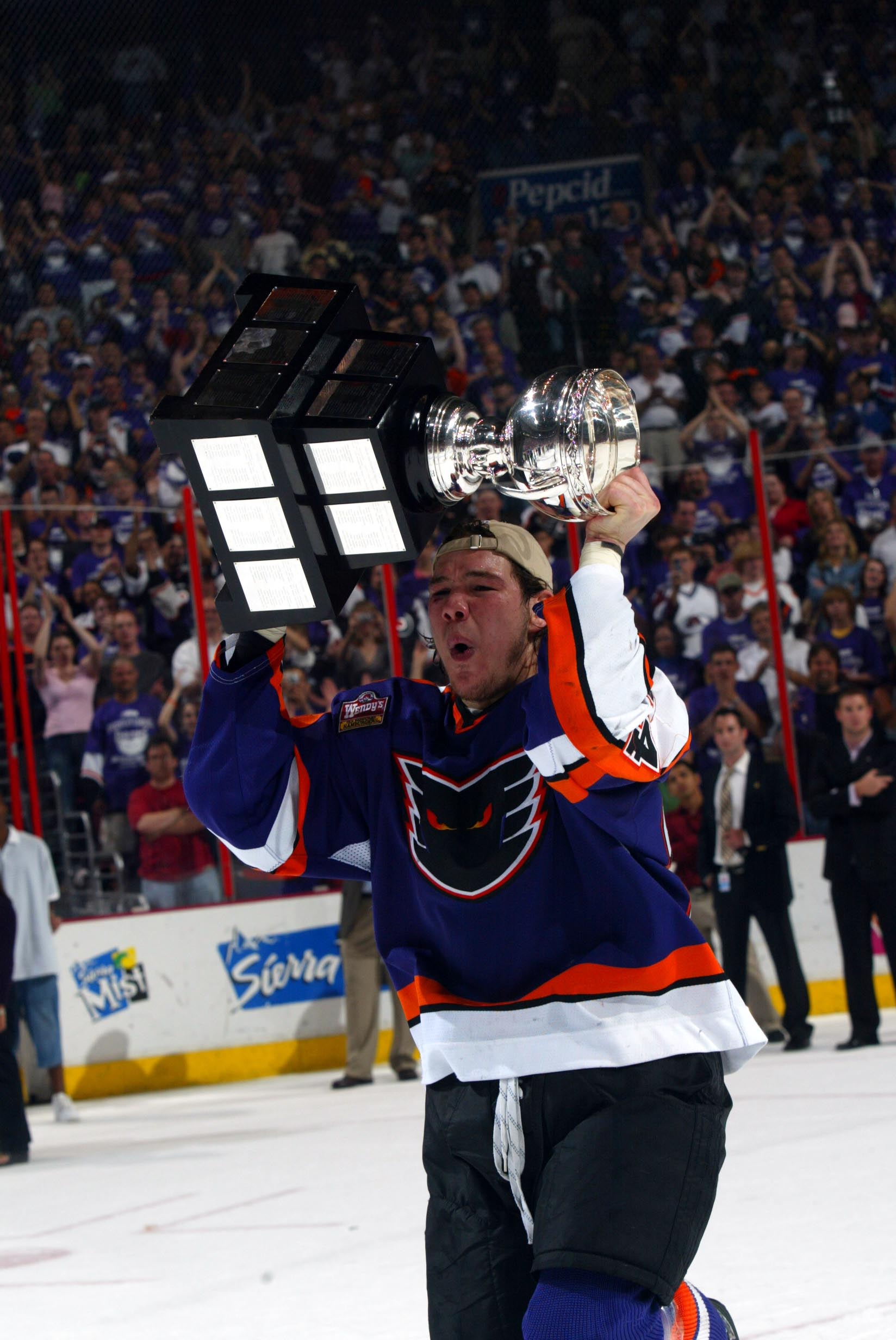
- Gratton lifts the Calder Cup in 2005
- Born: September 9, 1982 (age 44) Brantford, Ontario, Canada
- Height: 6 ft 2 in (188 cm)
- Weight: 214 lb (97 kg; 15 st 4 lb)
- Position: Left wing
- Shot: Left
- Played for: Philadelphia Flyers; Phoenix Coyotes; Vityaz Chekhov; Barys Astana; Rødovre Mighty Bulls; Ässät Pori; Glasgow Clan
- NHL draft: Undrafted
- Playing career: 2003–2019
- Website: joshgratton.com

Josh Gratton (born September 9, 1982) is a Canadian former professional ice hockey left winger who last played for the South Carolina Stingrays of the ECHL. Gratton played in the National Hockey League (NHL) for the Philadelphia Flyers and the Phoenix Coyotes. His cousin is former NHL forward Chris Gratton.

== Playing career ==
Undrafted, Gratton was first signed to an NHL contract with the Philadelphia Flyers on July 27, 2004.

On March 9, 2006, Gratton was traded along with two second round draft picks to the Phoenix Coyotes for Denis Gauthier. He scored his first NHL goal as a Coyote on April 11, 2006, against the Colorado Avalanche.

On February 28, 2008, Gratton was traded along with Fredrik Sjöström and David LeNeveu from the Phoenix Coyotes to the New York Rangers for Marcel Hossa and Al Montoya. Gratton was then assigned to the Rangers' American Hockey League (AHL) affiliate, the Hartford Wolf Pack.

On July 9, 2008, the Nashville Predators signed Gratton to a one-year, two-way contract. After starting the 2008–09 season with the Predators' affiliate, Milwaukee Admirals, Gratton returned to Philadelphia when he was traded in exchange for Tim Ramholt on October 30, 2008.

On July 30, 2009, Gratton signed a one-year contract with the Atlanta Thrashers. During the 2009-10 season, on January 8, 2010, Gratton was reassigned by Atlanta to Vityaz Chekhov of the KHL. For his participation in a mass brawl against Avangard Omsk on December 10, 2010, he was suspended for 15 games.

On October 1, 2014, Gratton returned to compete in North America for the first time in four years, in accepting a try-out contract with the Manchester Monarchs of the AHL to begin the 2014–15 season. Gratton secured a one-year contract with the Monarchs and 46 games added 13 points and a physical edge from the fourth line. Gratton appeared in seven post-season games in helping the Monarch capture their first Calder Cup in their final AHL season.

On August 17, 2015, Gratton returned abroad, agreeing to an initial try-out contract with Finnish club, Ässät Pori of the SM-liiga.

In July 2018 he signed with the Glasgow Clan of the Elite Ice Hockey League in the United Kingdom. In December 2018, Gratton was released by the Clan and he signed with the South Carolina Stingrays of the ECHL.

== Career statistics ==
			Regular season					Playoffs
Season	Team	League	GP	G	A	Pts	PIM	GP	G	A	Pts	PIM
2000–01	Sudbury Wolves	OHL	44	5	13	18	110	9	1	1	2	25
2001–02	Sudbury Wolves	OHL	14	5	4	9	47	—	—	—	—	—
2001–02	Kingston Frontenacs	OHL	46	14	14	28	140	1	1	0	1	7
2002–03	Kingston Frontenacs	OHL	15	7	7	14	60	—	—	—	—	—
2002–03	Windsor Spitfires	OHL	47	19	23	42	132	6	2	1	3	8
2003–04	San Diego Gulls	ECHL	30	4	6	10	239	—	—	—	—	—
2003–04	Cincinnati Mighty Ducks	AHL	21	2	2	4	69	8	0	0	0	35
2004–05	Philadelphia Phantoms	AHL	57	9	5	14	246	21	3	3	6	78
2004–05	Trenton Titans	ECHL	1	0	0	0	0	—	—	—	—	—
2005–06	Philadelphia Phantoms	AHL	53	9	10	19	265	—	—	—	—	—
2005–06	Philadelphia Flyers	NHL	3	0	0	0	14	—	—	—	—	—
2005–06	Phoenix Coyotes	NHL	11	1	0	1	30	—	—	—	—	—
2006–07	Phoenix Coyotes	NHL	52	1	1	2	188	—	—	—	—	—
2006–07	San Antonio Rampage	AHL	3	1	1	2	8	—	—	—	—	—
2007–08	Phoenix Coyotes	NHL	1	0	0	0	5	—	—	—	—	—
2007–08	San Antonio Rampage	AHL	38	5	9	14	124	—	—	—	—	—
2007–08	Hartford Wolf Pack	AHL	20	6	6	12	72	4	0	1	1	11
2008–09	Milwaukee Admirals	AHL	7	2	3	5	10	—	—	—	—	—
2008–09	Philadelphia Phantoms	AHL	14	1	0	1	41	2	0	0	0	2
2008–09	Philadelphia Flyers	NHL	19	1	2	3	57	—	—	—	—	—
2009–10	Chicago Wolves	AHL	21	0	2	2	60	—	—	—	—	—
2009–10	Vityaz Chekhov	KHL	11	2	3	5	112	—	—	—	—	—
2010–11	Vityaz Chekhov	KHL	24	5	2	7	170	—	—	—	—	—
2011–12	Barys Astana	KHL	35	1	3	4	91	—	—	—	—	—
2012–13	Rødovre Mighty Bulls	DEN	2	0	1	1	2	—	—	—	—	—
2012–13	Kuban Krasnodar	VHL	8	1	0	1	58	—	—	—	—	—
2012–13	Saryarka Karaganda	VHL	6	0	1	1	25	15	1	1	2	54
2013–14	Barys Astana	KHL	11	1	3	4	12	—	—	—	—	—
2014–15	Manchester Monarchs	AHL	46	6	7	13	84	7	0	1	1	11
2015–16	Ässät	SM-liiga	37	3	3	6	81	—	—	—	—	—
2016–17	Rytíři Kladno	WSM Liga	14	1	2	3	47	11	0	1	1	6
2017–18	Gamyo d'Épinal	Ligue Magnus	22	13	10	23	49	—	—	—	—	—
2017–18	HC Nové Zámky	Slovak Extraliga	3	0	0	0	2	—	—	—	—	—
2018–19	Glasgow Clan	EIHL	23	10	13	23	22	—	—	—	—	—
2018–19	South Carolina Stingrays	ECHL	37	4	14	18	123	4	1	0	1	18
AHL totals			280	41	43	84	984	42	3	5	8	137
NHL totals			86	3	3	6	294	—	—	—	—	—

== Awards and honours ==
Award	Year
AHL
Calder Cup (Philadelphia Phantoms)	2005
Calder Cup (Manchester Monarchs)	2015
