= Tim Ramholt =

Swiss ice hockey player

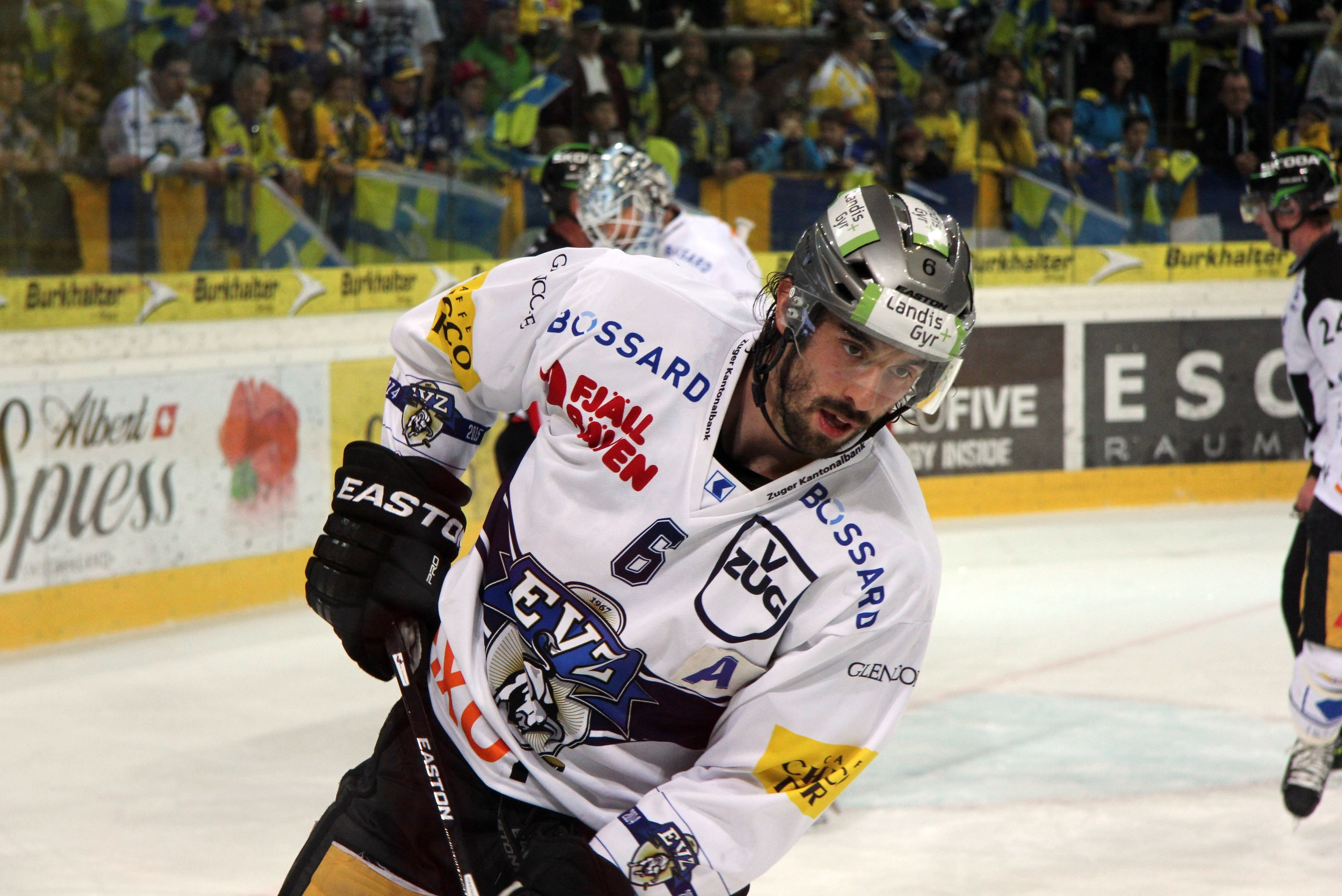
- Born: November 2, 1984 (age 41) Zurich, Switzerland
- Height: 6 ft 1 in (185 cm)
- Weight: 195 lb (88 kg; 13 st 13 lb)
- Position: Defence
- Shot: Left
- Played for: ZSC Lions; EHC Kloten; Calgary Flames; HC Davos; EV Zug
- National team: Switzerland
- NHL draft: 39th overall, 2003; Calgary Flames
- Playing career: 2001–2018

Tim Ramholt (born November 2, 1984) is a Swiss former professional ice hockey defenceman who last played under contract for EHC Kloten of the Swiss National League (NL). He began his professional career with the ZSC Lions before moving to North America in the hopes of a National Hockey League (NHL) career. Ramholt was selected by the Calgary Flames in the second round, 39th overall, at the 2003 NHL entry draft. He played one NHL game for the Flames and after spending three years in the American Hockey League (AHL), returned to Switzerland for 2009–10. Internationally, Ramholt represented the Swiss junior team on four occasions. He won a silver medal at the 2001 IIHF World U18 Championships in Finland, then represented the U20 team three times between 2002 and 2004, with his best finish being a fourth-place result in 2002.

== Playing career ==
Ramholt played in the 1998 Quebec International Pee-Wee Hockey Tournament with a youth team from Zürich. He developed as a defenceman playing for his hometown Zürich in the Swiss junior and Nationalliga B (NLB) leagues. He was a member of the silver medal-winning Swiss team at the 2001 IIHF World U18 Championships, where he scored one assist in seven games. He made his top level debut for the ZSC Lions in 2001–02, appearing in 37 games and scoring three goals. Ramholt played 30 more games for ZSC in 2002–03, but also spent considerable time with their NLB team, the GCK Lions as the 17-year-old struggled to gain ice time with ZSC and began to contemplate moving onto another team.

He was ranked as the 16th best skater by NHL Central Scouting entering the 2003 NHL entry draft. Ramholt was selected by the Calgary Flames in the second round, 39th overall, who felt his strong skating and puck moving ability made him ideally suited for the North American game. Ramholt, who had played in Calgary before – he was named the top defenceman at the 2002 Mac's AAA midget hockey tournament – looked forward to playing on the smaller North American ice surface. He was also selected by the Cape Breton Screaming Eagles of the Quebec Major Junior Hockey League (QMJHL) in the 2003 Canadian Hockey League European draft, and chose to play the 2003–04 season in Cape Breton where he scored 9 goals and 27 assists for the Screaming Eagles.

Ramholt returned to Switzerland to play with ZSC in 2004–05 and then the Kloten Flyers in 2005–06, a decision that the Flames organization did not agree with. Ramholt admitted that he hoped he would better develop his game as a player in the Swiss top league rather than the North American minor leagues. After admitting that that decision might have been a mistake, he signed a three-year contract with the Flames and returned to North America in the summer of 2006. The Flames assigned him to their American Hockey League (AHL) affiliate, the Omaha Ak-Sar-Ben Knights for the 2006–07 season, where he scored 12 points in 67 games.

He continued in the AHL in 2007–08, playing 77 games with the Quad City Flames, scoring 24 points. An injury to Adrian Aucoin earned Ramholt a call-up to Calgary, and he played his first NHL game on November 29, 2007, against the Anaheim Ducks. He played only one shift, a total of 45 seconds, before being returned to Quad City. No longer in their plans, he was traded by the Flames to the Philadelphia Flyers for minor league forward Kyle Greentree on June 30, 2008. Ramholt began the 2008–09 season in the AHL with the Philadelphia Phantoms, but after playing just seven games, was again traded. The Flyers sent him to the Nashville Predators for Josh Gratton. He was assigned to Nashville's minor league affiliate, the Milwaukee Admirals, where he played 59 more games, scoring two goals and eight assists. Following the season, Ramholt returned to Switzerland, signing a two-year contract with HC Davos.

== International play ==
Medal record

Representing Switzerland

Ice hockey

IIHF World U18 Championships
| Silver medal – second place | 2001 Finland | |

The Swiss junior team called upon Ramholt to play in World Junior Hockey Championships three times. He played seven games in the 2002 tournament, scoring one assist, as the Swiss finished fourth.

He returned for the 2003 and 2004 tournaments, playing six games each, as the Swiss finished seventh and sixth, respectively. Ramholt expressed disappointment in his team's results, as the Swiss had hoped to follow their 4th-place finish in 2002 with a medal in 2003.

== Personal ==
Ramholt's elder brother, Arne was a draft pick of the Chicago Blackhawks in 2000. He played one year in the AHL, for the Norfolk Admirals in 2000–01, in between a ten-year career in the Swiss leagues.

== Career statistics ==
=== Regular season and playoffs ===
| | | | Regular season | | | | | Playoffs |
| Season | Team | League | GP | G | A | Pts | PIM | GP | G | A | Pts | PIM |
|---|---|---|---|---|---|---|---|---|---|---|---|---|
| 1999–2000 | Grasshopper Club Zürich | SUI U20 | 35 | 2 | 9 | 11 | 26 | 4 | 0 | 2 | 2 | 4 |
| 1999–2000 | Grasshopper Club Zürich | SUI.2 | 2 | 0 | 0 | 0 | 0 | — | — | — | — | — |
| 1999–2000 | SC Küsnacht | SUI.3 |
| 2000–01 | Grasshopper Club Zürich | SUI U20 | 17 | 3 | 6 | 9 | 10 | — | — | — | — | — |
| 2000–01 | GCK Lions | SUI.2 | 37 | 0 | 2 | 2 | 38 | 3 | 0 | 0 | 0 | 4 |
| 2001–02 | GCK Lions | SUI U20 | 5 | 2 | 2 | 4 | 4 | — | — | — | — | — |
| 2001–02 | GCK Lions | SUI.2 | 3 | 0 | 0 | 0 | 0 | — | — | — | — | — |
| 2001–02 | ZSC Lions | NLA | 37 | 3 | 0 | 3 | 14 | 15 | 0 | 3 | 3 | 2 |
| 2002–03 | GCK Lions | SUI U20 | 6 | 2 | 2 | 4 | 2 | 1 | 0 | 0 | 0 | 0 |
| 2002–03 | GCK Lions | SUI.2 | 12 | 0 | 4 | 4 | 6 | — | — | — | — | — |
| 2002–03 | ZSC Lions | NLA | 30 | 3 | 0 | 3 | 12 | 9 | 0 | 1 | 1 | 6 |
| 2003–04 | Cape Breton Screaming Eagles | QMJHL | 51 | 9 | 27 | 36 | 26 | 5 | 0 | 1 | 1 | 4 |
| 2004–05 | ZSC Lions | NLA | 41 | 1 | 3 | 4 | 36 | 15 | 0 | 0 | 0 | 8 |
| 2005–06 | Kloten Flyers | NLA | 42 | 0 | 1 | 1 | 46 | 11 | 0 | 1 | 1 | 8 |
| 2006–07 | Omaha Ak–Sar–Ben Knights | AHL | 67 | 2 | 10 | 12 | 61 | 6 | 0 | 1 | 1 | 10 |
| 2007–08 | Quad City Flames | AHL | 77 | 4 | 20 | 24 | 73 | — | — | — | — | — |
| 2007–08 | Calgary Flames | NHL | 1 | 0 | 0 | 0 | 0 | — | — | — | — | — |
| 2008–09 | Philadelphia Phantoms | AHL | 7 | 0 | 0 | 0 | 0 | — | — | — | — | — |
| 2008–09 | Milwaukee Admirals | AHL | 59 | 2 | 8 | 10 | 36 | 8 | 0 | 1 | 1 | 8 |
| 2009–10 | HC Davos | NLA | 50 | 2 | 12 | 14 | 44 | 6 | 0 | 2 | 2 | 4 |
| 2010–11 | HC Davos | NLA | 50 | 9 | 15 | 24 | 42 | 14 | 1 | 4 | 5 | 10 |
| 2011–12 | HC Davos | NLA | 50 | 1 | 8 | 9 | 82 | 4 | 0 | 0 | 0 | 4 |
| 2012–13 | HC Davos | NLA | 50 | 2 | 13 | 15 | 40 | 7 | 0 | 0 | 0 | 8 |
| 2013–14 | EV Zug | NLA | 45 | 3 | 8 | 11 | 58 | — | — | — | — | — |
| 2014–15 | EV Zug | NLA | 50 | 9 | 10 | 19 | 48 | 6 | 0 | 0 | 0 | 0 |
| 2015–16 | EV Zug | NLA | 50 | 7 | 11 | 18 | 36 | 4 | 0 | 1 | 1 | 2 |
| 2016–17 | EHC Kloten | NLA | 22 | 0 | 5 | 5 | 51 | — | — | — | — | — |
| 2017–18 | EHC Kloten | NL | 31 | 1 | 3 | 4 | 28 | — | — | — | — | — |
| NL totals | | | 548 | 41 | 89 | 130 | 537 | 91 | 1 | 12 | 13 | 52 |
| NHL totals | | | 1 | 0 | 0 | 0 | 0 | — | — | — | — | — |
| AHL totals | | | 210 | 8 | 38 | 46 | 170 | 14 | 0 | 2 | 2 | 18 |

=== International ===
| Year | Team | Event | Result | GP | G | A | Pts | PIM |
|---|---|---|---|---|---|---|---|---|
| 2001 | Switzerland | WJC18 | 2nd place, silver medalist(s) | 7 | 0 | 1 | 1 | 4 |
| 2002 | Switzerland | WJC | 4th | 7 | 0 | 1 | 1 | 6 |
| 2002 | Switzerland | WJC18 | 7th | 8 | 1 | 4 | 5 | 12 |
| 2003 | Switzerland | WJC | 7th | 6 | 2 | 2 | 4 | 2 |
| 2004 | Switzerland | WJC | 8th | 6 | 1 | 1 | 2 | 4 |
| 2014 | Switzerland | WC | 10th | 2 | 0 | 0 | 0 | 0 |
| Junior totals | | | | 34 | 4 | 9 | 13 | 28 |
| Senior totals | | | | 2 | 0 | 0 | 0 | 0 |
