= Dane Byers =

Canadian professional ice hockey player

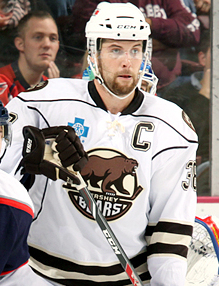
- Byers with the Hershey Bears in 2013
- Born: February 21, 1986 (age 40) Nipawin, Saskatchewan, Canada
- Height: 6 ft 3 in (191 cm)
- Weight: 204 lb (93 kg; 14 st 8 lb)
- Position: Left wing
- Shot: Left
- Played for: New York Rangers; Columbus Blue Jackets; Hartford Wolf Pack; Springfield Falcons; San Antonio Rampage; Oklahoma City Barons; Hershey Bears; Ilves Tampere; Lahti Pelicans; Kölner Haie; Manchester Storm
- NHL draft: 48th overall, 2004; New York Rangers
- Playing career: 2006–2019

Dane Byers (born February 21, 1986) is a Canadian former professional ice hockey player. He last played for and captained Manchester Storm of the UK's EIHL. He was originally drafted by the New York Rangers 48th overall in the 2004 NHL entry draft.

== Playing career ==
=== Junior ===
Byers began his junior hockey career with the Prince Albert Raiders of the WHL in 2002-03, where he scored eight goals and 14 points in 49 games. Byers returned to the Raiders in 2003-04, as he scored nine goals and 17 points in 51 games, then he added a goal and three points in six playoff games. Byers appeared in 65 games with the Raiders in 2004-05, scoring 11 goals and 20 points, while accumulating 181 penalty minutes. Byers had a strong playoff run, scoring four goals and 10 points in 17 games. Byers broke out offensively in the 2005-06 season, scoring 21 goals and 48 points in 71 games; however, the Raiders failed to qualify for the playoffs.

=== Professional ===
After his junior season ended with the Prince Albert Raiders, the New York Rangers assigned Byers to the Hartford Wolf Pack to finish the 2005-06 season. Byers had two assists in five games with Hartford. He spent the entire 2006-07 season with the Wolf Pack, where Byers had 17 goals and 47 points, along with 213 penalty minutes in 78 games. In seven playoff games, Byers scored two goals. Byers returned to Hartford for the 2007-08 season, where he had 23 goals and 46 points in 73 games. In five playoff games, Byers had a goal and three points. He also made his NHL debut during the 2007-08 NHL season, going pointless in one game with the New York Rangers.

Byers missed most of the 2008–09 season due to a knee injury suffered during a game against the Worcester Sharks on October 31, 2008. In nine games, Byers had four goals and seven points, and he returned for the playoffs for Hartford, where Byers had three goals and four points in six games. Byers rebounded from his injury shortened season in 2009–10, as he had 25 goals and 52 points in 74 games with the Wolf Pack. Byers also appeared in five games with the Rangers, scoring his first NHL goal against Niklas Bäckström of the Minnesota Wild on October 30, 2009. Several days later, Byers was given an automatic one-game suspension by the NHL for instigating a fight with forward Tanner Glass in the final five minutes of a 4–1 loss to the Vancouver Canucks on November 3.

Byers began the 2010–11 season with Hartford, where in 16 games he had three goals and nine points. On November 11, 2010, the Rangers traded Byers to the Columbus Blue Jackets in exchange for Chad Kolarik.

The Blue Jackets assigned Byers to the AHL's Springfield Falcons, where he had nine goals and 25 points in 48 games. Byers was once again on the move, as on February 28, 2011, Byers and Rostislav Klesla were traded from the Blue Jackets to the Phoenix Coyotes in exchange for Scottie Upshall and Sami Lepistö. As a result of the mid-season trades, Byers was able to set an AHL record for most games played in a season, with 85. But, on July 11, 2011, he was signed to go back to the Jackets. On January 16, 2012, Byers was given a three-game suspension by the NHL for an illegal check to the head of Andrew Desjardins during a game against the San Jose Sharks on January 14, 2012.

On July 5, 2012, the Edmonton Oilers signed Byers to a one-year, two-way contract. He was assigned to the Oilers' AHL affiliate, the Oklahoma City Barons, to begin the 2012–13 season. On April 2, 2013, he was traded to the Washington Capitals in exchange for Garrett Stafford.

On June 26, 2013, despite no contract extension with Washington, Byers signed a one-year contract to remain with the Capitals' AHL affiliate, the Hershey Bears.

After two seasons as captain of the Bears, Byers left North America and signed a try-out contract with Finnish Liiga club Ilves on September 22, 2015. In his first stint overseas, Byers recorded two goals in six games with Ilves before signing with rivals Lahti Pelicans for the remainder of the season on October 12, 2015.

On May 23, 2016, Byers signed with Kölner Haie of the German Deutsche Eishockey Liga (DEL).

On 1 June 2017, Byers moved to the United Kingdom to sign for Elite Ice Hockey League club Manchester Storm.

Byers played for two years in Manchester, the second as captain, before retiring in April 2019.

== Family ==
Byers' brother Cole Byers was also a professional hockey player who played for the Hull Stingrays in the British Elite Ice Hockey League. The brothers are also cousins of former NHL enforcer-turned-radio host Lyndon Byers.

== Career statistics ==
=== Regular season and playoffs ===
			Regular season					Playoffs
Season	Team	League	GP	G	A	Pts	PIM	GP	G	A	Pts	PIM
2002–03	Prince Albert Raiders	WHL	49	8	6	14	46	—	—	—	—	—
2003–04	Prince Albert Raiders	WHL	51	9	8	17	134	6	1	2	3	17
2004–05	Prince Albert Raiders	WHL	65	11	9	20	181	17	4	6	10	18
2005–06	Prince Albert Raiders	WHL	71	21	27	48	157	—	—	—	—	—
2005–06	Hartford Wolf Pack	AHL	5	0	2	2	6	—	—	—	—	—
2006–07	Hartford Wolf Pack	AHL	78	17	30	47	213	7	2	0	2	16
2007–08	Hartford Wolf Pack	AHL	73	23	23	46	184	5	2	1	3	2
2007–08	New York Rangers	NHL	1	0	0	0	0	—	—	—	—	—
2008–09	Hartford Wolf Pack	AHL	9	4	3	7	18	6	3	1	4	7
2009–10	Hartford Wolf Pack	AHL	74	25	26	51	100	—	—	—	—	—
2009–10	New York Rangers	NHL	5	1	0	1	31	—	—	—	—	—
2010–11	Hartford Wolf Pack	AHL	16	3	6	9	25	—	—	—	—	—
2010–11	Springfield Falcons	AHL	48	9	16	25	95	—	—	—	—	—
2010–11	San Antonio Rampage	AHL	21	3	9	12	41	—	—	—	—	—
2011–12	Springfield Falcons	AHL	61	16	23	39	108	—	—	—	—	—
2011–12	Columbus Blue Jackets	NHL	8	0	0	0	29	—	—	—	—	—
2012–13	Oklahoma City Barons	AHL	58	6	4	10	144	—	—	—	—	—
2012–13	Hershey Bears	AHL	5	0	0	0	11	1	0	1	1	0
2013–14	Hershey Bears	AHL	73	15	22	37	211	—	—	—	—	—
2014–15	Hershey Bears	AHL	43	7	12	19	91	—	—	—	—	—
2015–16	Ilves	Liiga	6	2	0	2	25	—	—	—	—	—
2015–16	Pelicans	Liiga	41	8	5	13	127	7	0	1	1	8
2016–17	Kölner Haie	DEL	49	7	5	12	119	7	0	0	0	14
2017–18	Manchester Storm	EIHL	55	24	46	70	107	2	0	2	2	2
2018–19	Manchester Storm	EIHL	56	29	26	55	182	—	—	—	—	—
AHL totals			564	128	176	304	1247	19	7	3	10	25
NHL totals			14	1	0	1	60	—	—	—	—	—

=== International ===
Year	Team	Event	Result	GP	G	A	Pts	PIM
2004	Canada	WJC18	4th	7	0	1	1	8
Junior totals				7	0	1	1	8
