= Curtis Fraser =

Canadian ice hockey player

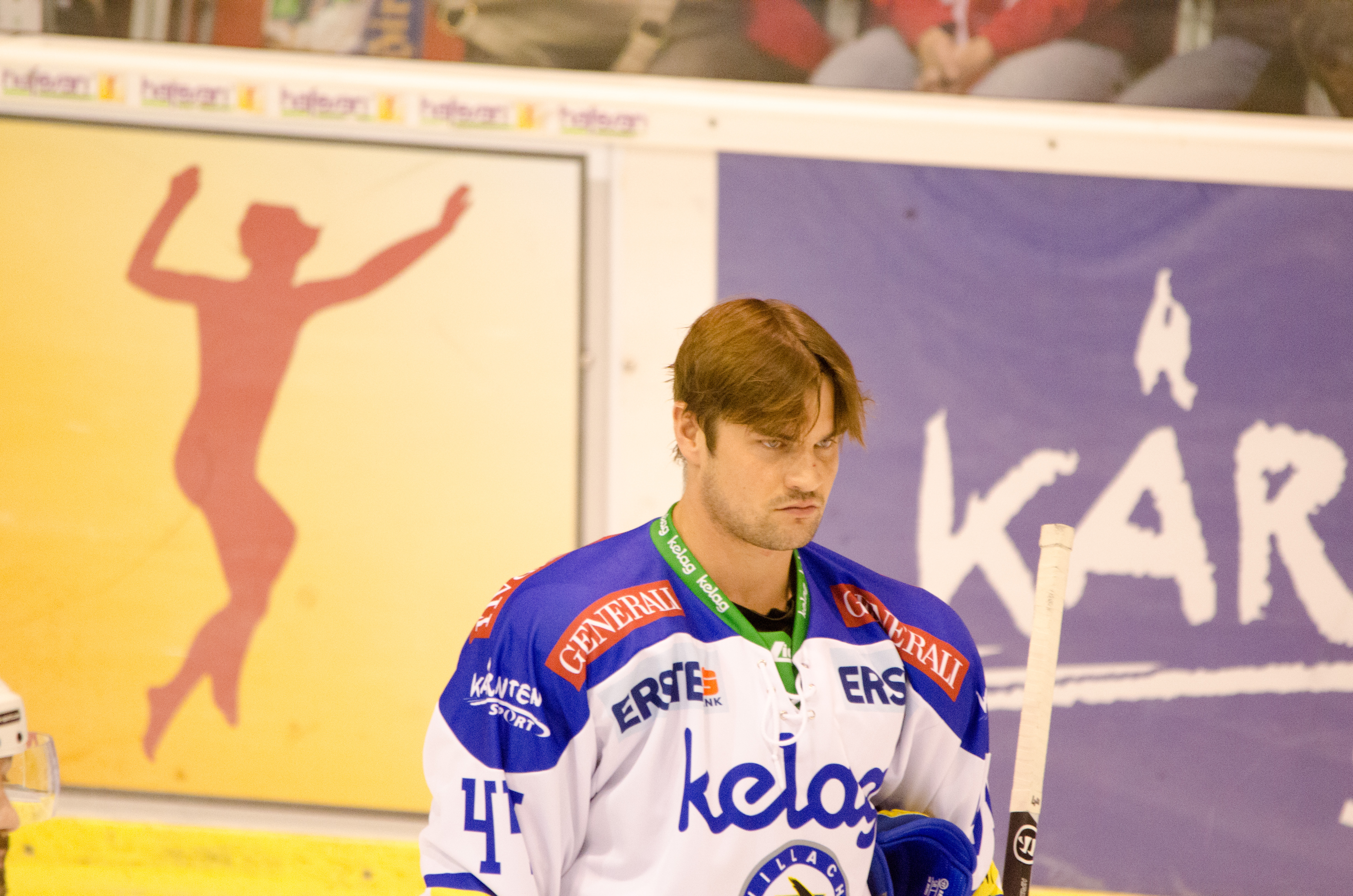
- Born: April 4, 1982 (age 44) Surrey, British Columbia, Canada
- Height: 6 ft 2 in (188 cm)
- Weight: 201 lb (91 kg; 14 st 5 lb)
- Position: Centre
- Shot: Left
- Played for: Chicago Wolves; San Antonio Rampage; Peoria Rivermen; Lake Erie Monsters; SG Cortina; KHL Medveščak; EC VSV
- Playing career: 2007–2014

Curtis Fraser (born April 4, 1982) is a Canadian former professional ice hockey centre.

== Playing career ==
Fraser played as a junior of the British Columbia Hockey League with the Victoria Salsa and the Vernon Vipers, before committed to a collegiate career with the University of Alaska Fairbanks of the Central Collegiate Hockey Association where he scored 114 points in 148 games over his four-year career. Undrafted, Curtis completed his senior year placed second to Kyle Greentree in scoring with 35 points, to leave the Nanooks ranked second in all-time games played.

Fraser immediately made his professional debut following college to finish the 2006–07 season in the post-season with the Chicago Wolves of the American Hockey League. Curtis initially signed in the ECHL with the Las Vegas Wranglers for the 2007–08 season and after 4 games with the Wranglers he was signed to a professional try-out contract with AHL affiliate, the San Antonio Rampage on November 15, 2007. Tasked as a grinding role-player in the AHL, Fraser remained with the Rampage for the duration of the campaign, to post 6 points and 85 penalty minutes in 41 games, including a career best two-goal game against the Milwaukee Admirals on January 23, 2008. He was then returned to the Wranglers for the post season and scored 7 goals in 16 games on their run to the Kelly Cup finals.

Fraser signed with the Peoria Rivermen for his third professional season in 2008–09. He played in a career high 65 games with the Rivermen for 8 points and 90 penalty minutes. In game 4 of the first round playoff series against the Houston Aeros, Curtis had his hand injured by a slapshot from teammate Steve Wagner causing him to miss the Rivermen's last three playoff games and had surgery to insert pins into his broken right hand.

Unable to earn a one-way contract with the Rivermen for the 2009–10 season, Fraser was invited to the Wilkes-Barre/Scranton Penguins training camp before suffering a dislocated shoulder in an exhibition game on September 19. He opted to then sign with the Rivermen's ECHL affiliate, the Alaska Aces, which marked a return from his college career days with the UAF. In an injury plagued year Fraser regained some offensive productivity with 13 points in a limited 17 games.

On September 20, 2010, Fraser returned to the Aces and was re-signed to a one-year contract. Invited on a try-out to attend the Lake Erie Monsters training camp for the 2010–11 season, Fraser made the Monsters opening season roster and made his AHL return in a 2–1 victory over the Syracuse Crunch on October 9, 2010. On February 17, 2011, he was released from his professional try-out with the Lake Erie Monsters.

Prior to the 2011–12 season, on June 28, 2011, Fraser signed a one-year contract with Italian club SG Cortina. The following season, he then joined KHL Medveščak of the Erste Bank Eishockey Liga. During the 2013–14 season Fraser remained in the EBEL, with EC VSV, but announced retirement after the end of the play-offs.

== Career statistics ==
			Regular season					Playoffs
Season	Team	League	GP	G	A	Pts	PIM	GP	G	A	Pts	PIM
1999–00	Victoria Salsa	BCHL	—	—	—	—	—	—	—	—	—	—
2000–01	Victoria Salsa	BCHL	46	7	19	26	60	—	—	—	—	—
2001–02	Victoria Salsa	BCHL	—	—	—	—	—	—	—	—	—	—
2002–03	Vernon Vipers	BCHL	60	53	52	105	116	—	—	—	—	—
2003–04	University of Alaska Fairbanks	CCHA	36	12	12	24	59	—	—	—	—	—
2004–05	University of Alaska Fairbanks	CCHA	36	17	14	31	62	—	—	—	—	—
2005–06	University of Alaska Fairbanks	CCHA	39	11	13	24	84	—	—	—	—	—
2006–07	University of Alaska Fairbanks	CCHA	37	19	16	35	36	—	—	—	—	—
2006–07	Chicago Wolves	AHL	—	—	—	—	—	4	0	0	0	0
2007–08	Las Vegas Wranglers	ECHL	5	3	8	11	5	16	7	1	8	26
2007–08	San Antonio Rampage	AHL	41	4	2	6	85	—	—	—	—	—
2008–09	Peoria Rivermen	AHL	65	2	6	8	90	2	0	0	0	7
2009–10	Alaska Aces	ECHL	17	8	5	13	18	4	0	0	0	8
2010–11	Lake Erie Monsters	AHL	36	5	3	8	44	—	—	—	—	—
2010–11	Alaska Aces	ECHL	20	6	8	14	21	13	6	4	10	14
2011–12	SG Cortina	ITL	40	19	20	39	81	9	2	5	7	14
2012–13	KHL Medveščak	EBEL	54	12	6	18	63	6	1	0	1	6
2013–14	EC VSV	EBEL	54	21	13	34	72	9	3	2	5	13
AHL totals			142	11	11	22	219	6	0	0	0	7
