= Cole Byers =

Canadian ice hockey player (born 1983)

- Born: April 16, 1983 (age 42) Nipawin, Saskatchewan, Canada
- Height: 6 ft 3 in (191 cm)
- Weight: 210 lb (95 kg; 15 st 0 lb)
- Position: Defence
- Shot: Left
- Played for: LNAH; Sorel-Tracy Mission; Quebec RadioX; ECHL; Victoria Salmon Kings; Trenton Devils; EIHL; Hull Stingrays; Eredivisie; Heerenveen Flyers
- Playing career: 2004–2009

Cole Byers (born April 16, 1983) is a Canadian former professional ice hockey defenceman.

Byers played the 2006–07 and 2007–08 seasons with the Hull Stingrays of the British Elite Ice Hockey League (EIHL).

His brother Dane Byers is a forward who has played in the National Hockey League with the New York Rangers and Columbus Blue Jackets.
