= Rod Pelley =

Canadian ice hockey player

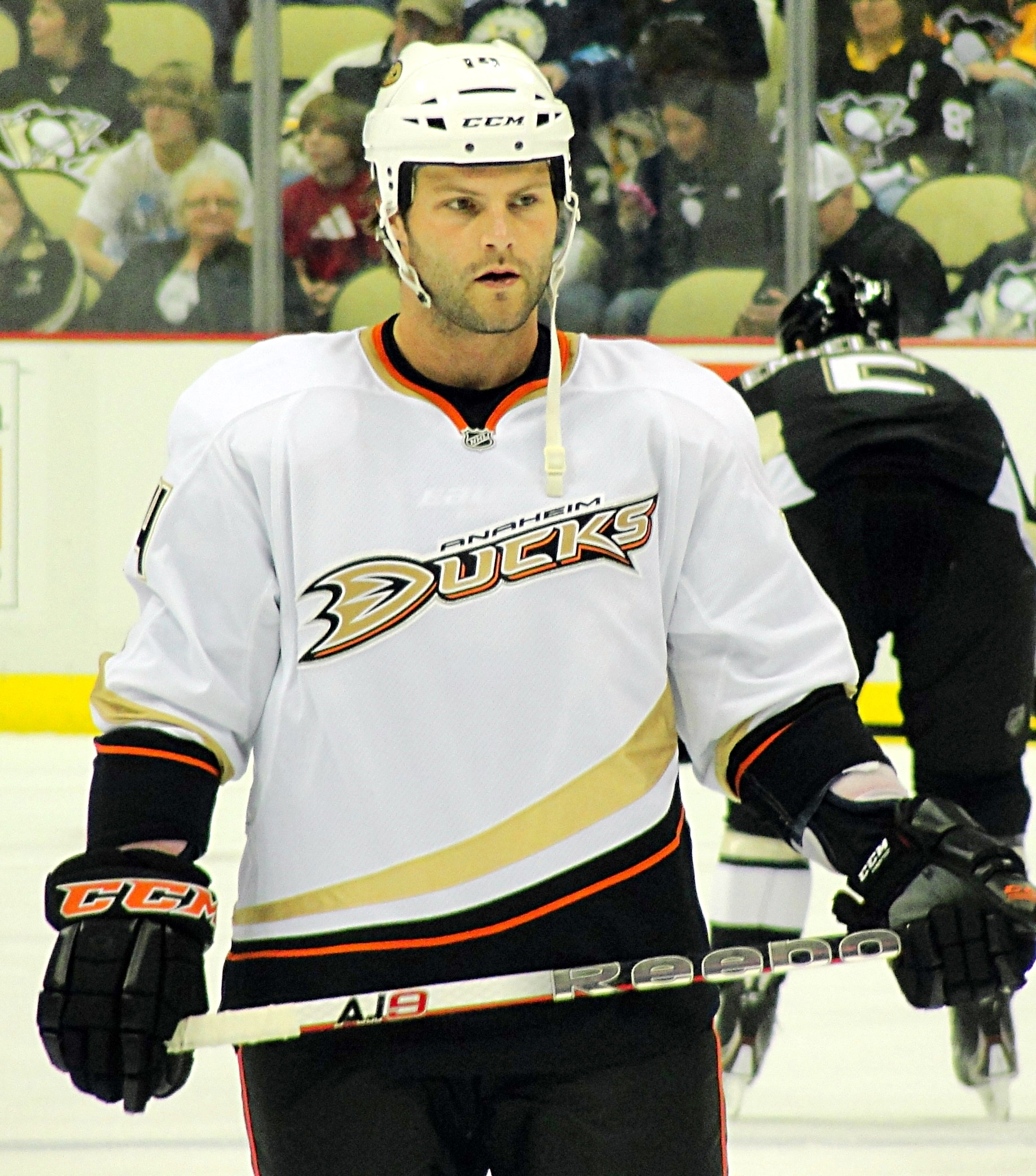
- Pelley with the Ducks in 2012.
- Born: September 1, 1984 (age 41) Kitimat, British Columbia, Canada
- Height: 6 ft 0 in (183 cm)
- Weight: 200 lb (91 kg; 14 st 4 lb)
- Position: Centre
- Shot: Left
- Played for: New Jersey Devils; Anaheim Ducks; SønderjyskE; HSC Csíkszereda
- NHL draft: Undrafted
- Playing career: 2006–2020

Rod Pelley (born September 1, 1984) is a Canadian former professional ice hockey centre. After his collegiate career, Pelley signed as a free agent with the New Jersey Devils, and was with the organization from 2006 to 2011. He was traded to the Anaheim Ducks on December 12, 2011.

== Playing career ==
Pelley was born in Kitimat, British Columbia, Canada, where he attended St. Anthony's Elementary School and Mount Elizabeth Secondary School. At the age of 16, Pelley moved on to play hockey in the BCHL, first with the Prince George Spruce Kings, finishing his BCHL career with the Vernon Vipers. He then went on to play NCAA Division 1 Hockey on an athletic scholarship for the Buckeyes of the Ohio State University. Pelley graduated with a degree in Sports Management in 2006.

After his collegiate career, Pelley signed as a free agent with the New Jersey Devils. He scored his first NHL goal on November 8, 2007 against Martin Biron of the Philadelphia Flyers.

With New Jersey's AHL affiliate, the Lowell Devils in the 2008–09 season, Pelley contributed 38 points in 75 games. He then played his first full season in the NHL in 2009–10 with New Jersey.

On December 12, 2011, Pelley, along with Mark Fraser and a 2012 7th round draft pick, was traded to the Anaheim Ducks in exchange for Kurtis Foster and Timo Pielmeier. New Jersey Devils GM, Lou Lamoriello spoke about the trade: "When you have such quality individuals (like Pelley and Fraser) who've given you so much each and every day in practice and in the locker room as support, you try and do the best for them. This is a win situation for both teams. They're getting two role players who will be tremendous for them and we're getting a player who has tremendous upside in the role we see that he'll fit."

A free agent with the 2012 NHL lock-out in place, Pelley signed midway into the 2012–13 season to a professional try-out contract with the Ducks' affiliate, the Norfolk Admirals of the AHL on November 23, 2012.

After the season with the Admirals, Pelley signed a one-year deal worth $550,000 to return to the New Jersey Devils. He played the next four seasons leading the Devils AHL affiliate in Albany.

As a free agent, Pelly opted to continue in the AHL signing a one-year deal with the Stockton Heat and agreeing to an invite to participate with NHL affiliate, the Calgary Flames training camp. On September 19, 2017, Pelley was re-assigned by the Flames to the Heat.

After a solitary season with the Heat, Pelley left North America as a free agent, securing a one-year contract with Danish club, SønderjyskE Ishockey of the Metal Ligaen on July 24, 2018. Pelley continued his European career the following season, playing with Romanian club, HSC Csíkszereda of the Erste Liga.

Having played 14 professional seasons, Pelley announced his retirement from hockey in September 2020.

== Career statistics ==
			Regular season					Playoffs
Season	Team	League	GP	G	A	Pts	PIM	GP	G	A	Pts	PIM
2000–01	Prince George Spruce Kings	BCHL	54	14	21	35	31	—	—	—	—	—
2001–02	Prince George Spruce Kings	BCHL	37	21	35	56	33	—	—	—	—	—
2001–02	Vernon Vipers	BCHL	19	10	8	18	29	—	—	—	—	—
2002–03	Ohio State University	CCHA	43	8	3	11	26	—	—	—	—	—
2003–04	Ohio State University	CCHA	42	10	12	22	38	—	—	—	—	—
2004–05	Ohio State University	CCHA	41	22	19	41	54	—	—	—	—	—
2005–06	Ohio State University	CCHA	39	7	7	14	42	—	—	—	—	—
2006–07	Lowell Devils	AHL	65	17	12	29	35	—	—	—	—	—
2006–07	New Jersey Devils	NHL	9	0	0	0	0	—	—	—	—	—
2007–08	New Jersey Devils	NHL	58	2	4	6	19	—	—	—	—	—
2007–08	Lowell Devils	AHL	11	2	1	3	18	—	—	—	—	—
2008–09	Lowell Devils	AHL	75	15	23	38	78	—	—	—	—	—
2009–10	New Jersey Devils	NHL	63	2	8	10	40	3	0	0	0	2
2010–11	New Jersey Devils	NHL	74	3	7	10	27	—	—	—	—	—
2011–12	New Jersey Devils	NHL	7	0	0	0	7	—	—	—	—	—
2011–12	Anaheim Ducks	NHL	45	2	1	3	9	—	—	—	—	—
2012–13	Norfolk Admirals	AHL	60	3	7	10	34	—	—	—	—	—
2013–14	Albany Devils	AHL	74	13	7	20	55	4	0	0	0	2
2014–15	Albany Devils	AHL	70	7	6	13	65	—	—	—	—	—
2015–16	Albany Devils	AHL	65	8	5	13	40	11	2	0	2	0
2016–17	Albany Devils	AHL	71	6	7	13	34	4	0	0	0	2
2017–18	Stockton Heat	AHL	65	4	4	8	30	—	—	—	—	—
2018–19	SønderjyskE	DEN	29	7	11	18	22	14	2	2	4	6
2019–20	HSC Csíkszereda	Erste	44	17	11	28	12	—	—	—	—	—
NHL totals			256	9	20	29	102	3	0	0	0	2

== Awards and honours ==
Award	Year
College
CCHA All-Tournament Team	2004
All-CCHA Second Team	2004–05
