= Sean Collins (ice hockey defenseman) =

American ice hockey player (born 1983)

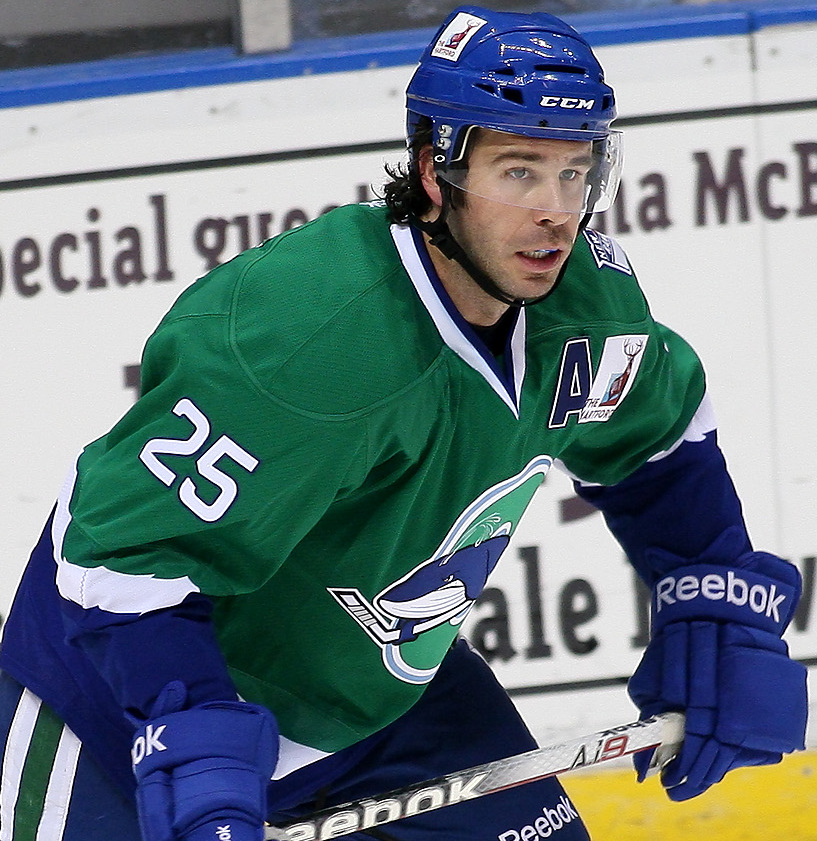
- Collins with the Connecticut Whale in 2012
- Born: October 30, 1983 (age 41) Troy, Michigan, U.S.
- Height: 6 ft 1 in (185 cm)
- Weight: 212 lb (96 kg; 15 st 2 lb)
- Position: Defense
- Shot: Right
- Played for: Washington Capitals
- NHL draft: Undrafted
- Playing career: 2007–2013

Sean Patrick Collins (born October 30, 1983) is an American former professional ice hockey defenseman who played in the National Hockey League with the Washington Capitals.

== Playing career ==
As a youth, Collins played in the 1997 Quebec International Pee-Wee Hockey Tournament with the Detroit Little Caesars minor ice hockey team.

=== College ===
Prior to going to Ohio State, he spent the 2002–03 season with the Sioux City Musketeers of the United States Hockey League, posted six goals, 22 assists and 89 PIM. He became a member of the Cleveland Barons in 2001–02, where he contributed six goals and 22 assists. Barons' assistant captain named him the Sarnia Rookie of the Year in his first year of juniors. He also played baseball and made numerous sports all-star appearances, and attended Bishop Foley Catholic High School in Madison Heights, Mich., before graduating from Rocky River High School in Rocky River, Ohio, in 2002.

2003–04: (Freshman season) Collins saw action in 41-of-42 Buckeye games on the blueline, and finished second in season among other OSU rookies, and third among Buckeye defensemen with 16 points, including 13 assists. This gained him his team's season-high, tying three assists in win over Northern Michigan November 8, 2003, which helped mark his first career points. He was named CCHA Defensive Player of the Week on March 7, 2004, after the second Miami series; had 1-2-3 vs. the Red Hawks and was not on the ice for a goal against his second career two-assist night came vs. Miami March 6, 2004. He scored the career-best four-game scoring streak, with 2-4-6 totals, from March 5–13, 2004, and scored his first career goal at Western Michigan on February 20, 2004. He had the team-best (+4) in series vs. Lake Superior State, including career-high +3 on January 16, 2004, as well as two assists in win over Bowling Green on November 29, 2003. In the 1-1-2 game vs. Bowling Green on March 13, he scored a +1 rating in 13 games, as well as +2 in five games and +3 vs. LSSU on January 16, 2004, and scored even or better in all but 10 games. He, as well, scored +1 or better in 15 of last 29 games, with just five minus ratings in the stretch, but missed the first career game on March 18, 2004, vs. Notre Dame after receiving a game disqualification against Bowling Green on March 13, 2004.

2004–05: (Sophomore season) Collins had nine goals and 17 assists for career-best, as well as 26 points in 40 games leading the Buckeye defensemen, and was ranked at sixth overall on the team. He scored nine goals tied for fifth in the nation among defensemen and led the CCHA, being known as an honorable mention All-CCHA choice and a two-time CCHA Defenseman of the Week. Collins scored gamewinner against Michigan State in CCHA Super Six semifinals on March 18, and fifth in the CCHA in overall points and ranked 22nd in the nation in scoring among defensemen overall (.65 points a game). Collins ended '04 fifth in CCHA as defenseman in points (18). He had two helpers vs. Ferris State March 11 in game one of the playoff series, and scored empty netter at Miami March 4 to gain a 3–1 win, as well as scoring two assists in the January 21, 2005 game vs. Michigan, 1–1–2, January 15 at Notre Dame, and January 29 vs. Western Michigan. Collins had the third-period game-tying goal in two of Ohio State's four ties, tied career high with three assists, and had individual-best four points in win over Alaska on December 4, 2004. He scored game-tying goal in the third period vs. No. 2 Colorado College on December 30, and scored the game-tying goal on the power play in the third period at Clarkson on December 10. Collins had two helpers and was +3 in an overtime win over Ferris State on October 16. He earned the title of CCHA Defenseman of the Week on October 18 after the series at Ferris State, as well as earning multiple league honors after helping OSU to a home sweep of Northern Michigan with two points (1-1) in the series on November 13–14. He had an assist and was +2 in the November 5 win over Sacred Heart. He scored back-to-back +2 ratings at Miami on March 4 and vs. Ferris State on March 11, as well as +3 on January 29 vs. Western Michigan and at Lake State on February 5, but missed the second UNO contest (November 20) and the March 5th Miami home game with injuries. Overall, Collins scored +6 over the '05 year.

2005–06: (Junior season) Collins served as alternate captain and played in all 39 games as he led defensemen and tied for third on the squad, amassing 18 points. He had scored seven goals to tie for fifth on the team and tied for third with 11 assists. He was awarded CCHA Defenseman of the Week after Union Series on December 10–11, and had 1-1-2 and a +4 rating vs. the Dutchmen (as well as four blocked shots on December 10) to claim fourth career league honor. He scored career-best two goals, nine shots and a +4 rating at Western Michigan on October 29. He scored a goal vs. Union on December 10, and marked the 50th career point. Collins earned the title of Buckeye Sports Bulletin Icer of the Month on December, and had 37 recorded blocked shots to rank second on the squad, including five at Michigan, February 3 and vs. Nebraska-Omaha, January 14. He earned a two-point weekend at Michigan, February 3–4, with an assist in opener and goal in the second game, and scored a three-game assist streak on November 25–26 at Notre Dame and vs. Alabama-Huntsville on December 2. Collins scored on the power play at Alaska, January 20, vs. Miami, December 30 and at Bowling Green, October 20. He achieved third on the squad with a +13 rating, with just 7- outings. Collins managed to play in the 100th career game vs. Miami on December 30 in the Ohio Hockey Classic. He scored two points, as a goal and an assist, vs. Holy Cross on December 29, and set up John Dingle's gamewinner vs. Miami on January 10. He finished as fourth on the squad with 26 penalties and third with 63 penalty minutes, ranked second with 117 shots, and was second runner-up for Best Power-Play Pointman in CCHA Captains' Poll. He finished the year as a Preseason All-CCHA Honorable Mention.

2006–07: Collins completed his college career as a senior at Ohio State (CCHA). He served as the Buckeyes’ captain and a second-team All-CCHA selection as well as one of three finalists for both CCHA Best Offensive Defenseman and CCHA Best Defensive Defenseman honors. He led OSU in scoring with nine goals and 19 assists for 28 points in 37 games; four of his goals came on the power play. He made his professional debut for Hershey (AHL) vs. Binghamton on March 25. He played three games for Hershey, posting two PIM.

=== Professional ===
Collins played 12 games for Hershey (AHL) and 31 for South Carolina (ECHL). He registered 11 PIM in Hershey. He had one goal, 13 assists and 16 PIM for South Carolina. He scored his lone goal vs. Gwinnett on February 1. He had three assists vs. Columbia on March 29, his only multi-point game of the season. He led club defensemen with nine points (1+8) in 20 playoff games, as the team advanced to the Kelly Cup semifinals. Collins earned the title of Ohio State Career Two-time Honorable Mention All-CCHA (2005, 2006), as well as a finalist for CCHA Best Offensive Defenseman accolades in 2005, a 2006 Scarlet and Gray Award winner, and was voted team's 2004 George Burke Most Valuable Freshman. He was named to CCHA Super Six All-Tournament Team in 2005 and became a four-time CCHA player of the week. Collins signed with the Washington Capitals organization.

Collins played in 15 games with the Capitals and in 39 games with Hershey (AHL). Collins had a +1 rating in Washington and averaged 14:40 of ice time a game. On December 6, 2008, Collins made his [NH]L debut in a road game against the Toronto Maple Leafs. Wearing #62, the undrafted defenseman logged 18 shifts and spent 13 minutes, 42 seconds, on the ice as the Capitals defeated Toronto 2–1. Collins recorded his first NHL point with an overtime assist 12/23 at NYR. He scored his first NHL goal 1/1 vs. TB ... Had eight points (1g-7a) with Hershey. Collins also played in six Calder Cup playoff games and had two assists as Hershey won the Calder Cup.

Collins started off the year at the Capitals training camp and was one of the last defensemen sent to Hershey. Collins played the entire year in Hershey and ended the regular season with 63 games played, 55 PIM, 17 assists, +26, and 1 goal. Collins and the Hershey Bears won the Calder Cup two years in a row. Collins ended the playoff season with 15 games played, 16 PIM, 2 assists, +2, and 1 goal.

In the 2011–12 season, Collins played two games with the Capitals. During the summer he signed as a free agent with the New York Rangers.

Collins was assigned to AHL affiliate, the Connecticut Whale for the 2012–13 season, in which he contributed with 13 assists in 76 games. At the conclusion of the season, Collins opted to retire from professional hockey.

== Career statistics ==
			Regular season					Playoffs
Season	Team	League	GP	G	A	Pts	PIM	GP	G	A	Pts	PIM
2000–01	Cleveland Jr. Barons	NAHL	55	0	10	10	30	—	—	—	—	—
2001–02	Cleveland Jr. Barons	NAHL	56	5	23	28	54	—	—	—	—	—
2002–03	Sioux City Musketeers	USHL	59	6	22	28	89	4	0	1	1	2
2003–04	Ohio State Buckeyes	CCHA	41	3	12	15	57	—	—	—	—	—
2004–05	Ohio State Buckeyes	CCHA	40	9	17	26	40	—	—	—	—	—
2005–06	Ohio State Buckeyes	CCHA	39	7	11	18	63	—	—	—	—	—
2006–07	Ohio State Buckeyes	CCHA	37	9	19	28	50	—	—	—	—	—
2006–07	Hershey Bears	AHL	3	0	0	0	2	—	—	—	—	—
2007–08	Hershey Bears	AHL	12	0	0	0	11	—	—	—	—	—
2007–08	South Carolina Stingrays	ECHL	31	1	13	14	16	20	1	8	9	24
2008–09	Hershey Bears	AHL	39	1	7	8	38	6	0	2	2	2
2008–09	Washington Capitals	NHL	15	1	1	2	12	—	—	—	—	—
2009–10	Hershey Bears	AHL	63	1	17	18	55	15	1	2	3	16
2010–11	Hershey Bears	AHL	73	4	16	20	78	—	—	—	—	—
2010–11	Washington Capitals	NHL	4	1	0	1	0	1	0	0	0	0
2011–12	Hershey Bears	AHL	65	2	8	10	45	5	0	0	0	4
2011–12	Washington Capitals	NHL	2	0	0	0	0	—	—	—	—	—
2012–13	Connecticut Whale	AHL	76	0	13	13	46	—	—	—	—	—
NHL totals			21	2	1	3	12	1	0	0	0	0

== Awards and honors ==
Award	Year
CCHA All-Tournament Team	2005
All-CCHA Second Team	2006–07
