= Lucas Burnett =

Canadian professional ice hockey player

- Born: April 1, 1982 (age 44) Rossland, B.C., CAN
- Height: 6 ft 1 in (185 cm)
- Weight: 224 lb (102 kg; 16 st 0 lb)
- Position: Forward
- Shoots: Right
- team Former teams: Free Agent; Tulsa Oilers; Manchester Phoenix
- Playing career: 2007–present

Lucas Burnett (born April 1, 1982) is a Canadian professional ice hockey player, currently without a club after being released by the Manchester Phoenix.

== Playing career ==
Born in Rossland, British Columbia, Burnett began his career at junior level in 2000–01 with the Beaver Valley Nitehawks. The Nitehawks ice in the Kootenay International Junior Hockey League and in the 2000-01 season, Burnett totalled 32 goals and 33 assists in just 42 games. This productivity saw Burnett move up to the British Columbia Hockey League's Trail Smoke Eaters for the 2001–02 term, a Tier II 'A' junior team.

Burnett showed his offensive ability, scoring 11 goals and helping out with 18 assists, and gaining the team's 'Most Improved' award in doing so. Burnett stayed with the Smoke Eaters for the 2002–03 season and again his productivity increased, this time scoring 24 goals and grabbing 28 assists for a total of 53 points in 57 BCHL games. Again Burnett was honoured with an award, the 'Most Unsung Player' for the Smoke Eaters.

In 2003-04, Burnett moved to play college hockey at NCAA standard, choosing to play for the University of Alaska Fairbanks team, known as the Alaska Nanooks. Burnett earned his first NCAA career goal against Ferris State, and claimed the game's 'number one star' spot in the process. Burnett totalled just six points in 35 games in his first season, but this improved to 14 points in 37 games for the 2004–05 season, a season which also saw Burnett promoted to the Nanooks' power play unit.

Burnett played for the Nanooks for two more seasons, combining his regular appearances with his majoring in Psychology and Criminal Justice. He played on 78 further occasions for Fairbanks, scoring 28 points along the way and impressing coaches with his high work rate which was recognized in being awarded the 'Don Jamieson Unsung Hero' and 'Ricky Pitta Most Dedicated Player' awards for the final three of his four seasons in Alaska. Burnett was the team's alternate captain in 2005–06 and shouldered the responsibility so well that he was promoted to full captain for his final term.

Burnett's dedication and effort earned him a spot with the Central Hockey League Tulsa Oilers for the 2007–08 season. He became a regular player for the Oilers, and featured in 59 regular season games. Burnett once again found his scoring touch in the process, scoring 36 points and totalling 83 penalty minutes. Despite this, his contract was not renewed, and Burnett found himself as a free agent in the summer of 2008.

This did not last, and Burnett was signed by the Manchester Phoenix in October as a replacement for the departing Grant Jacobsen. This re-united him with former Oilers teammate Josh Garbutt. Burnett soon established himself as a dependable and hard working player for the Phoenix, attributes which will hopefully carry the team into the EIHL post-season.

Despite being a late addition to the squad, Burnett gelled quickly and ended the season with 44 points in 56 games. During the season he alternated between the second and third offensive lines. Manchester qualified for both domestic cup finals as well as making the post-season during a successful 2008–09 season. Despite this, financial problems continued to dog the organization and as a result, owner Neil Morris announced in the close season that Manchester would play in the EPL for the 2009–10 season. The EPL has much stricter rules regarding foreign imports and also limits the operational budget and consequently Burnett along with most of the senior squad was released.

== Career stats ==
			Regular season					Playoffs
Season	Team	League	GP	G	A	Pts	PIM	GP	G	A	Pts	PIM
2000–01	Beaver Valley Nitehawks	KIJHL	42	32	33	65		—	—	—	—	—
2001–02	Trail Smoke Eaters	BCHL		11	18	29		—	—	—	—	—
2002–03	Trail Smoke Eaters	BCHL	57	24	28	53	45	—	—	—	—	—
2003–04	U. of Alaska-Fairbanks	CCHA	35	3	3	6	6	—	—	—	—	—
2004–05	U. of Alaska-Fairbanks	CCHA	37	5	9	14	20	—	—	—	—	—
2005–06	U. of Alaska-Fairbanks	CCHA	39	7	6	13	24	—	—	—	—	—
2006–07	U. of Alaska-Fairbanks	CCHA	39	3	12	15	22	—	—	—	—	—
2007–08	Tulsa Oilers	CHL	59	15	21	36	83	—	—	—	—	—
2008–09	Manchester Phoenix	EIHL	44	16	20	36	40	2	0	1	1	0
EIHL totals			44	16	20	36	40	2	0	1	1	0
