= Brandon Rogers (ice hockey) =

American ice hockey player (born 1982)

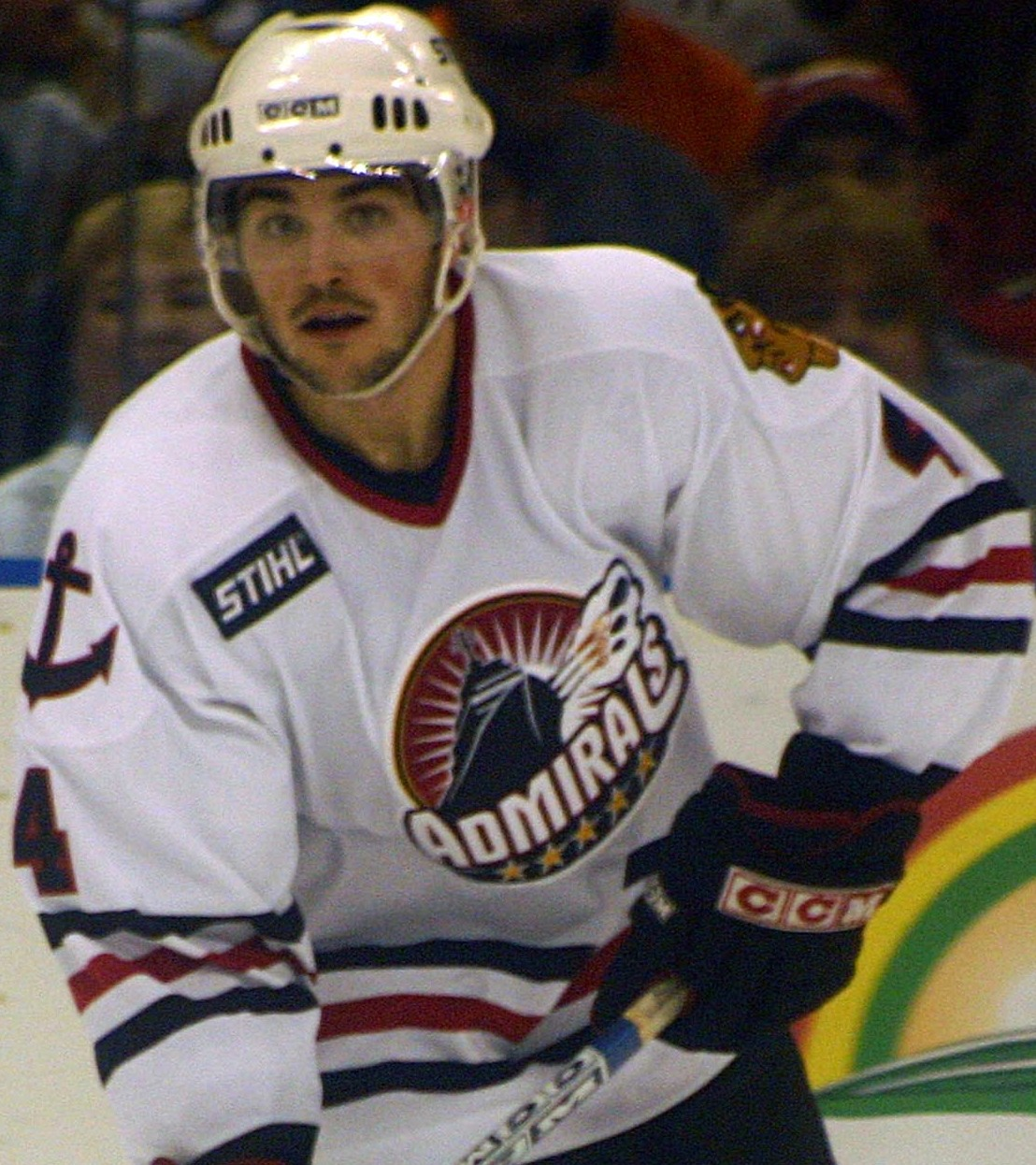
- Rogers with the Norfolk Admirals in 2006
- Born: February 27, 1982 (age 44) Rochester, New Hampshire, United States
- Height: 6 ft 1 in (185 cm)
- Weight: 198 lb (90 kg; 14 st 2 lb)
- Position: Defense
- Shot: Left
- Played for: Omaha Ak-Sar-Ben Knights; Norfolk Admirals; Houston Aeros; Lake Erie Monsters; Iserlohn Roosters
- NHL draft: 118th overall, 2001; Mighty Ducks of Anaheim
- Playing career: 2005–2013

Brandon Rogers (born February 27, 1982) is an American former professional ice hockey defenseman who last played with the Iserlohn Roosters in the DEL.

== Playing career ==
Rogers was drafted 118th overall in the 2001 NHL entry draft by the Mighty Ducks of Anaheim. He played high school hockey at the Hotchkiss School in Connecticut before undertaking a collegiate career at the University of Michigan for the Michigan Wolverines of the Central Collegiate Hockey Association.

After turning professional, and unsigned, he was invited to the Calgary Flames training camp for the 2005–06 season. Rogers was then assigned to the Flames affiliate the Omaha Ak-Sar-Ben Knights in the AHL before he was loaned to the Norfolk Admirals.

On August 23, 2007, Rogers continued in the AHL after was signed by the Houston Aeros. After a solid 2007–08 season, Rogers he was signed to his first NHL contract, a two-year deal, by parent club the Minnesota Wild on July 15, 2008.

After participating in the Wild's training camp, Rogers was returned to the Aeros for the 2008–09 campaign. As an Alternate Captain, Brandon led the Aeros defense with 29 assists and scored a career-high 32 points in 74 games. Rogers coinciding community efforts throughout the year, saw him earn the Yanick Dupre Memorial Award as the AHL's Man of the Year. In the 2009–10 season, Brandon played his third consecutive year with Houston, however due to injury and a lack of form recorded, a career low 8 points in 60 games.

Without an offer of a new contract with the Wild, Rogers remained with the Houston Aeros on a try-out to begin the 2010–11 season. After only one game with the Aeros, he was released on October 27, 2010. As a free agent, Rogers was later signed on a professional try-out agreement with fellow AHL club, the Lake Erie Monsters, on November 6, 2010. After 7 games with the Monsters, Rogers suffered a concussion and was sidelined indefinitely, releasing him from his try-out. On February 1, 2011, he was then signed by Slovakian team, HK SKP Poprad, for the remainder of the season.

In the following season, Rogers enjoyed a full season in the Italian Serie A, playing with HC Bolzano. Upon completion of the campaign, Rogers signed to remain in Europe, stepping up to the German DEL to a one-year contract with the Iserlohn Roosters on June 28, 2012.

In the 2012–13 season, Rogers played in 51 games, registering 20 points from the blueline to finish second amongst Roosters defenseman. Despite being unable to help Iserlohn qualify for the playoffs, Rogers was re-signed to a one-year contract extension on February 13, 2013. On May 16, 2013, despite contracted to the Roosters for the following season, Rogers opted to retire from professional hockey.

== Career statistics ==
			Regular season					Playoffs
Season	Team	League	GP	G	A	Pts	PIM	GP	G	A	Pts	PIM
1997–98	Berwick Academy	HS Prep
1998–99	Hotchkiss School	HS Prep
1999–2000	Hotchkiss School	HS Prep
2000–01	Hotchkiss School	HS Prep
2001–02	University of Michigan	CCHA	31	2	1	3	30	—	—	—	—	—
2002–03	University of Michigan	CCHA	43	4	21	25	65	—	—	—	—	—
2003–04	University of Michigan	CCHA	43	7	15	22	46	—	—	—	—	—
2004–05	University of Michigan	CCHA	42	5	22	27	70	—	—	—	—	—
2005–06	Omaha Ak–Sar–Ben Knights	AHL	42	0	8	8	24	—	—	—	—	—
2005–06	Norfolk Admirals	AHL	27	3	7	10	28	2	0	0	0	4
2006–07	Norfolk Admirals	AHL	64	0	9	9	92	6	0	0	0	14
2007–08	Houston Aeros	AHL	63	4	24	28	77	5	0	1	1	2
2008–09	Houston Aeros	AHL	74	3	29	32	80	20	0	3	3	12
2009–10	Houston Aeros	AHL	60	3	5	8	44	—	—	—	—	—
2010–11	Houston Aeros	AHL	1	0	1	1	2	—	—	—	—	—
2010–11	Lake Erie Monsters	AHL	7	0	3	3	6	—	—	—	—	—
2010–11	HK Poprad	SVK	5	0	2	2	4	13	1	0	1	18
2011–12	HC Bolzano	ITA	31	4	10	14	44	12	1	3	4	14
2012–13	Iserlohn Roosters	DEL	51	4	16	20	44	—	—	—	—	—
AHL totals			337	13	83	96	353	33	0	4	4	32

== Awards and honors ==
Award	Year
College
CCHA All-Tournament Team	2003
All-CCHA Second Team	2003–04
CCHA All-Tournament Team	2005
AHL
Yanick Dupre Memorial Award	2008–09
