= Dave Caruso =

American ice hockey player

- Born: June 18, 1982 (age 43) Queens, New York, U.S.
- Height: 6 ft 1 in (185 cm)
- Weight: 218 lb (99 kg; 15 st 8 lb)
- Position: Goaltender
- Caught: Left
- Played for: AHL; Chicago Wolves; Lowell Devils; Albany Devils; Charlotte Checkers; ECHL; Gwinnett Gladiators; Trenton Devils
- NHL draft: Undrafted
- Playing career: 2006–2012

Dave Caruso (born June 18, 1982) is an American former professional ice hockey goaltender. Since September 2012, he has served as the goaltending coach for the Albany Devils in the American Hockey League (AHL).

== Career statistics ==
=== Regular season ===
Season	Team	League	GP	Min	GA	EN	SO	GAA	W	L	OTL	SV	SV%
2002–03	Ohio State University	CCHA	8	460	12	0	0	1.56	5	2	0	181	0.938
2003–04	Ohio State University	CCHA	14	762	25	0	2	1.97	9	3	0	304	0.924
2004–05	Ohio State University	CCHA	38	2272	81	0	2	2.14	25	9	4	900	0.917
2005–06	Ohio State University	CCHA	36	2146	77	0	5	2.15	13	18	5	828	0.915
2006-07	Gwinnett Gladiators	ECHL	38	2297	120	3	1	3.13	23	11	4	1132	0.904
2007-08	Trenton Devils	ECHL	34	1972	85	6	2	2.59	13	16	4	934	0.917
2007-08	Lowell Devils	AHL	16	930	51	1	0	3.29	7	8	0	428	0.894
2008-09	Lowell Devils	AHL	16	721	42	2	0	3.49	1	1	0	318	0.883
2009-10	Trenton Devils	ECHL	46	2650	135	6	1	3.06	21	20	2	1327	0.908
2010-11	Trenton Devils	ECHL	22	1283	71	4	0	3.32	5	12	4	688	0.906
2010-11	Albany Devils	AHL	18	941	56	1	1	3.57	7	8	0	412	0.880
			.	.	.	.	.	.	.	.	.	.	.

== Awards and honours ==
Award	Year
CCHA All-Tournament Team	2004
