= Jeremy Cheyne =

Canadian ice hockey and lacrosse player

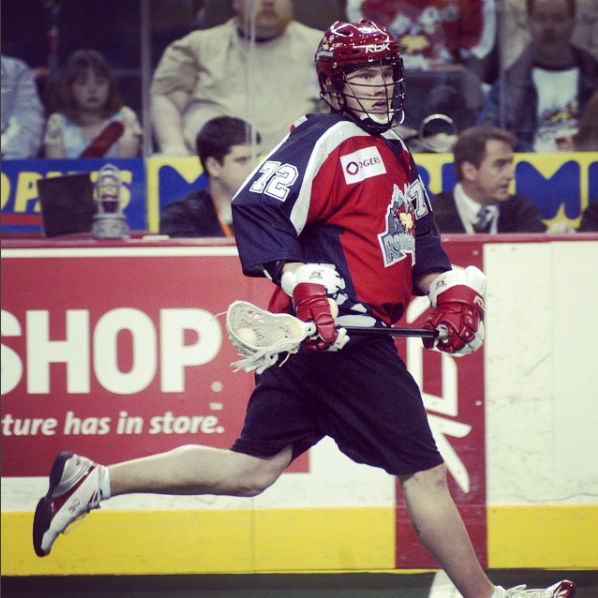
- Jeremy Cheyne playing for the Calgary Roughnecks in 2006.
- Born: July 10, 1980 (age 45) Calgary, Alberta, Canada
- Height: 5 ft 11 in (180 cm)
- Weight: 200 lb (91 kg; 14 st 4 lb)
- Position: Forward
- Shot: Right
- Played for: ECHL; Victoria Salmon Kings; Germany; ESV Bayreuth; NCAA; Western Michigan University; NLL; Calgary Roughnecks; WLA; Victoria Shamrocks
- NHL draft: Undrafted
- Playing career: 2001–2006

Jeremy Cheyne (born July 10, 1980) is a Canadian retired professional athlete who is credited for being one of the only Canadian-born athletes to play both professional ice hockey and lacrosse.

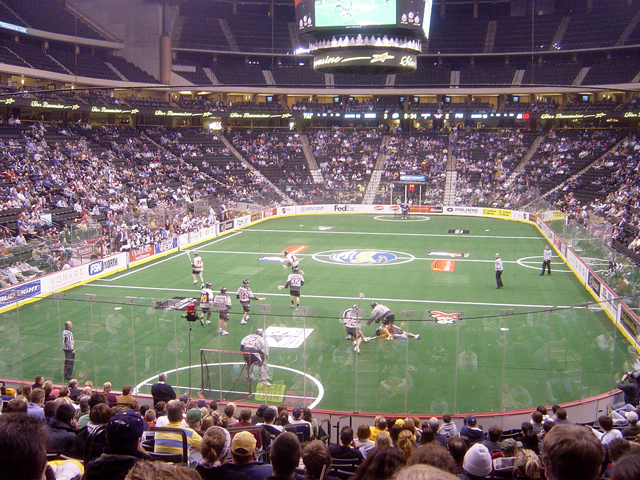
National Lacrosse League game

== Athletics ==
=== Lacrosse ===
In 2004, Cheyne signed a one-year contract with the Calgary Roughnecks Professional Lacrosse Club of the National Lacrosse League. In 2005, he re-signed for an additional two-year contract. In 2006, he was moved to the active playing roster. A lower body injury led to his eventual retirement following the 2006 campaign. On April 16, 2006, playing in his first NLL game versus the Colorado Mammoth, Cheyne collected 2 goals in a 17–7 loss.

In 2006, Cheyne signed with the Victoria Shamrocks of the Western Lacrosse Association.

In 2015, Cheyne's minor lacrosse jersey was retired by the Calgary Axemen Lacrosse Club in a ceremony held at the Canada Day Lacrosse Tournament on June 28, 2015.

=== Hockey ===
In 1997, Cheyne played midget AAA hockey with the Calgary Buffaloes in the Alberta Midget Hockey League (AMHL), recording 63 points (33 G, 30 A) in 33 regular-season games, along with 86 PIM. Including playoffs, he totalled 74 points (37 G, 37 A) in 42 games with 98 PIM, finishing seventh in league scoring. The Buffaloes won the AMHL league title and represented the Pacific Region at the 1998 Air Canada Cup in Sudbury, Ontario, earning the bronze medal. Cheyne was also selected to the AMHL South Division all-star team and scored a goal and an assist in a 9–6 loss to the North Division.

In 2001, Cheyne led the Alberta Junior Hockey League (AJHL) in scoring with 128 points (60 G, 68 A, 131 PIM) in 62 games. In the same year, Cheyne was selected to the AJHL All-League Team representing the North First Team as a member of the Fort McMurray Oil Barons. In addition, Cheyne was awarded the Ernie Love Trophy as the AJHL's top scorer and finished second in scoring in the Canadian Junior Hockey League.

In 2001, Cheyne received an athletic scholarship from Western Michigan University, which played Division I hockey in the Central Collegiate Hockey Association (CCHA). Cheyne was awarded the Peter R. Ellis Academic Award in both 2003 and 2004 for academic excellence and maintaining the highest grade point average, 3.94, in the WMU Broncos hockey program. On January 30, 2003, Cheyne was selected as the CCHA Offensive Player of the Week.

In 2004, Cheyne signed a one-year contract with the Victoria Salmon Kings of the ECHL.

=== Reality television ===
In the summer of 2004, Cheyne competed in a reality show entitled Making the Cut. The hockey-themed show aired on CBC Television in the fall of 2004 and showcased the top 68 Canadian professional hockey players not currently in the NHL. The show was filmed in Vernon, British Columbia, and included the coaching of Scotty Bowman and Mike Keenan.

== See also ==
- List of multi-sport athletes
