= Dan Hacker =

American ice hockey player (born 1982)

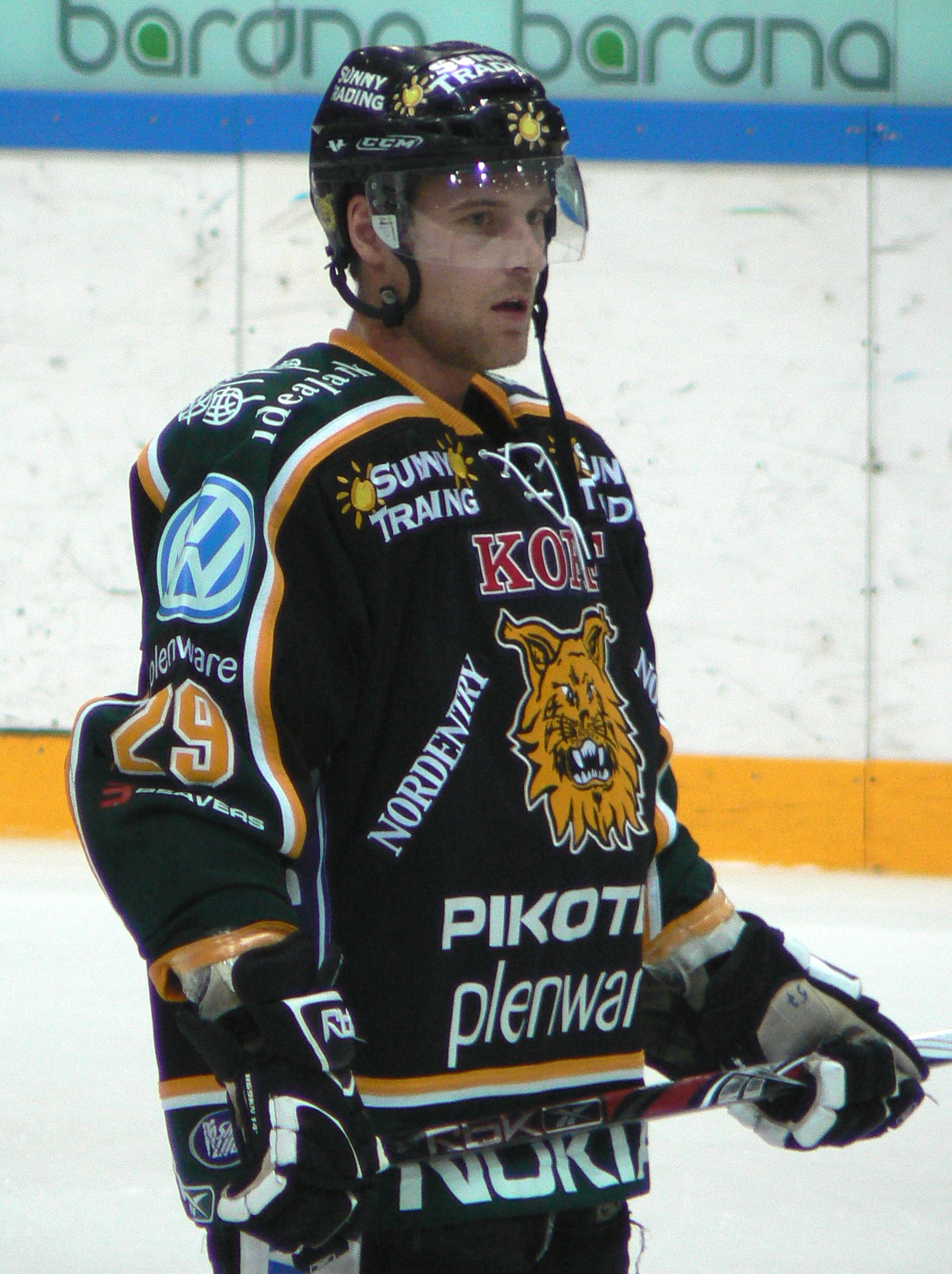
- Born: January 14, 1982 (age 43); El Centro, California, U.S.
- Height: 6 ft 0 in (183 cm)
- Weight: 190 lb (86 kg; 13 st 8 lb)
- Position: Center
- Shot: Left
- Played for: Iowa Stars; SaiPa; Ilves; HIFK; Schwenninger Wild Wings
- NHL draft: Undrafted
- Playing career: 2005–2015

Daniel Hacker (born January 14, 1982) is an American former professional ice hockey center who last played for the Schwenninger Wild Wings in the Deutsche Eishockey Liga. He previously played in the ECHL for the Idaho Steelheads, in the American Hockey League for the Iowa Stars, and in the Finnish SM-liiga for SaiPa, Ilves and HIFK. He initially joined the Schwenninger Wild Wings when they were competing in the German 2nd Bundesliga. On May 20, 2015, Hacker announced his retirement from professional hockey after 10 seasons.
