= Kyle Greentree =

Canadian ice hockey player

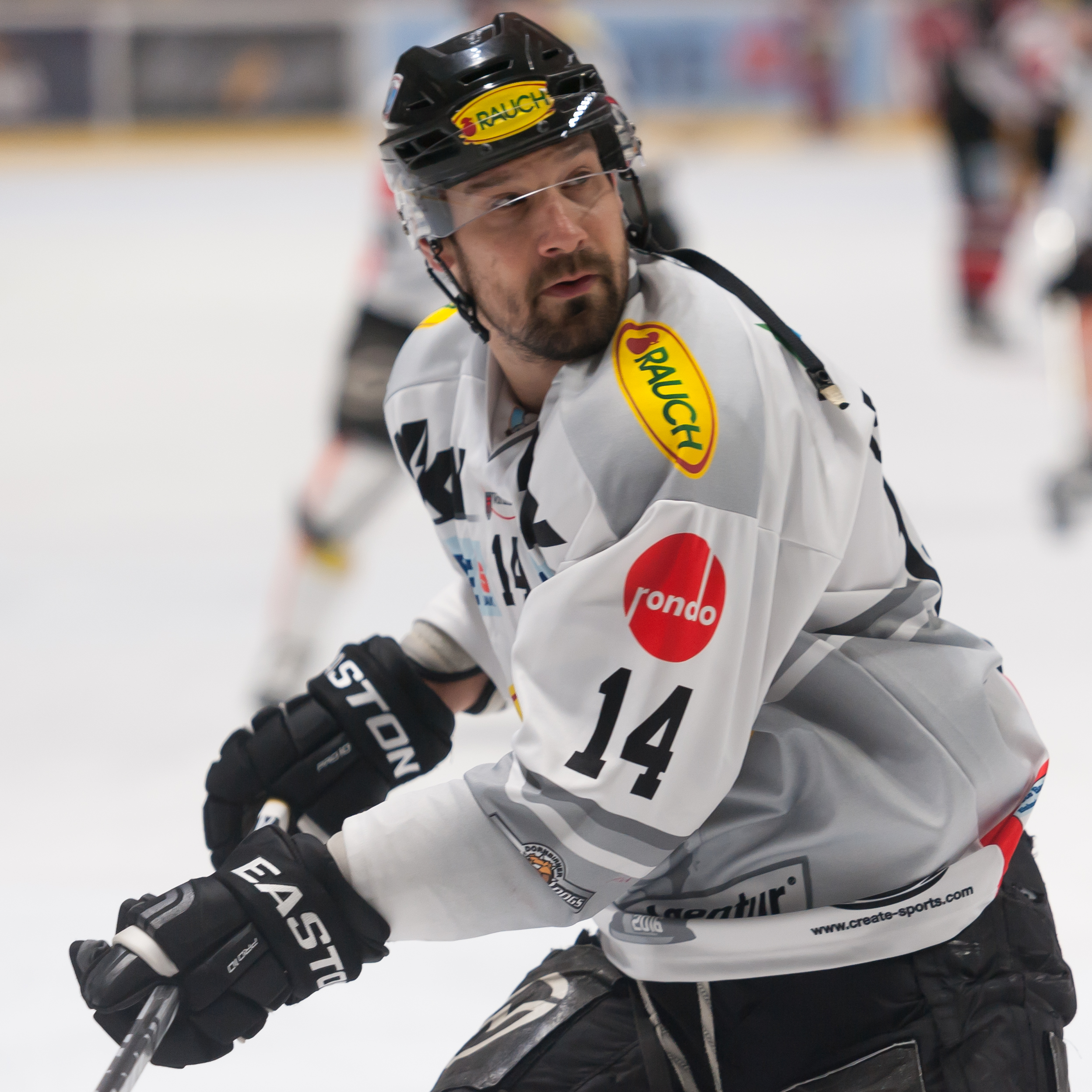
- Greentree with Dornbirner EC in 2016
- Born: November 15, 1983 (age 42) Victoria, British Columbia, Canada
- Height: 6 ft 3 in (191 cm)
- Weight: 200 lb (91 kg; 14 st 4 lb)
- Position: Left wing
- Shot: Left
- Played for: Philadelphia Flyers; Calgary Flames; KHL Medveščak Zagreb; EHC Basel; Schwenninger Wild Wings; Dornbirner EC
- NHL draft: Undrafted
- Playing career: 2007–2016

Kyle Greentree (born November 15, 1983) is a Canadian former professional ice hockey player. An undrafted player, he previously played two games each for the Philadelphia Flyers and Calgary Flames of the National Hockey League (NHL).

== Playing career ==
Greentree began playing collegiate hockey for the Alaska Fairbanks Nanooks during the 2004–05 season after playing for two seasons with the Victoria Salsa in the British Columbia Hockey League. He led his team in points for all three seasons he played there and got his number retired by the club.

Following his junior season, on March 14, 2007, Greentree decided to forgo his senior season and signed an entry-level contract with the Philadelphia Flyers. In 2007–08 He was assigned to the Flyers AHL affiliate, the Philadelphia Phantoms, to help them in their push to the playoffs. The Flyers recalled Greentree in February 2008 and he played in his first two NHL games.

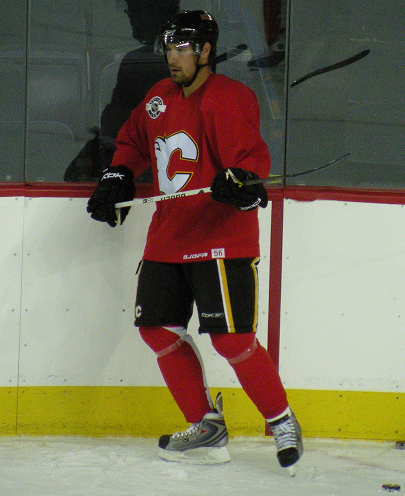
Greentree with the Calgary Flames in 2008

The Flyers traded Greentree on June 30, 2008, to the Calgary Flames for Tim Ramholt. Greentree spent most of the 2008–09 season with the AHL's Quad City Flames, earning a brief call up with Calgary in February, where he played in two games. Early in the 2009–10 season, he was dealt to the Chicago Blackhawks for Aaron Johnson.

Greentree, a free agent at season's end, signed a two-year contract with the Washington Capitals organization on July 7, 2010. He spent both seasons in the AHL with the Hershey Bears where he recorded 63 points in 74 games in 2010–11 and 34 points in 50 games in 2011–12. Greentree then left to play in Europe. He spent a year with Croatian club KHL Medveščak Zagreb of the Austrian Hockey League before moving to EHC Basel of the Swiss National League B for the 2013–14 season.

After a season (2014–15) with the Schwenninger Wild Wings, Greentree left the German DEL, signing a one-year deal with Dornbirner EC of the Austrian Hockey League on July 13, 2015. After one season with Dornbirn, on March 19, 2016, Greentree announced his retirement from professional hockey.

== Career statistics ==
			Regular season					Playoffs
Season	Team	League	GP	G	A	Pts	PIM	GP	G	A	Pts	PIM
1999–00	Victoria Salsa	BCHL	28	7	6	13	11	—	—	—	—	—
2000–01	Victoria Salsa	BCHL	59	27	38	65	50	—	—	—	—	—
2001–02	Victoria Salsa	BCHL	67	41	44	85	73	—	—	—	—	—
2002–03	Victoria Salsa	BCHL	53	46	51	97	110	—	—	—	—	—
2003–04	Victoria Salsa	BCHL	59	62	53	115	170	5	4	5	9	29
2004–05	Alaska Fairbanks Nanooks	CCHA	37	12	20	32	31	—	—	—	—	—
2005–06	Alaska Fairbanks Nanooks	CCHA	39	8	19	27	58	—	—	—	—	—
2006–07	Alaska Fairbanks Nanooks	CCHA	39	21	21	42	78	—	—	—	—	—
2006–07	Philadelphia Phantoms	AHL	8	2	0	2	2	—	—	—	—	—
2007–08	Philadelphia Phantoms	AHL	72	24	24	48	83	12	1	3	4	11
2007–08	Philadelphia Flyers	NHL	2	0	0	0	0	—	—	—	—	—
2008–09	Quad City Flames	AHL	79	39	37	76	63	—	—	—	—	—
2008–09	Calgary Flames	NHL	2	0	0	0	0	—	—	—	—	—
2009–10	Rockford IceHogs	AHL	64	25	20	45	57	3	0	0	0	19
2010–11	Hershey Bears	AHL	74	30	33	63	110	6	1	1	2	4
2011–12	Hershey Bears	AHL	50	11	23	34	50	5	1	0	1	18
2012–13	KHL Medveščak Zagreb	EBEL	51	24	30	54	95	5	3	8	11	10
2013–14	EHC Basel	NLB	42	23	36	59	78	5	0	7	7	12
2014–15	Schwenninger Wild Wings	DEL	50	11	21	32	50	—	—	—	—	—
2015–16	Dornbirner EC	EBEL	52	18	28	46	75	6	3	2	5	6
AHL totals			347	131	137	268	365	26	3	4	7	52
NHL totals			4	0	0	0	0	—	—	—	—	—
