= Perry Pooley =

Canadian ice hockey player

- Born: August 2, 1960 (age 66) Exeter, Ontario, Canada
- Height: 6 ft 0 in (183 cm)
- Weight: 174 lb (79 kg; 12 st 6 lb)
- Position: Forward
- Played for: Ohio State; Sherbrooke Canadiens; Fort Wayne Komets
- Playing career: 1980–1987

Perry Pooley is a Canadian retired ice hockey forward who was an All-American for Ohio State.

== Career ==
Perry and his twin brother Paul played junior hockey together, ending with the North York Rangers. In his final season of junior play, Pooley helped the Rangers win their league championship and two other regional championships to earn a bid to the Centennial Cup, the Canadian national Junior A championship. After the junior hockey success, the twins began attending Ohio State University the following fall and Perry turned into a solid player for the Buckeyes. In his four seasons with the program, Perry's stats reflected the team's success. His numbers dipped as a sophomore when the team went under .500 for the year but both rebounded sharply in 1983. Pooley more than doubled his career totals in all categories and helped Ohio State set a new program record with 26 wins. OSU finished tied for second in the conference and third in the CCHA Tournament.

As a senior, Pooley upped his game even further, finishing 6th in the nation in scoring and got the Buckeyes to their first (and only as of 2021) 30-win season. Pooley was named an All-American and again helped the team to a 3rd-place finish in their conference tournament, but it wasn't enough to get Ohio State an elusive NCAA Tournament berth. The Pooley brothers stayed together after graduating, signing with the Winnipeg Jets and playing for their farm team, Sherbrooke. In his first season as a pro, Pooley played with future NHL legend Patrick Roy as the young netminder led the Canadiens to the Calder Cup championship in 1985. Perry played in the minor leagues for three seasons before retiring as a player after the 1987 season.

Pooley began setting out his own path when he went to work in sales for PsP Net Solutions in the late 1980s. In the mid 90s he owned a sandwich shop as well but got out of both lines of work after becoming a partner in a residential and commercial irrigation company. After ending his first two professional jobs in 2002, Pooley was hired as the head coach for the newly created varsity hockey team at Dublin Coffman High School. Over nine seasons, Pooley built the program into a champion, winning three Blue Jacket Cup titles and a District championship in 2010. When his son Austin began playing, Pooley served as an assistant coach with the Blue Jackets' U-16 AAA team and scheduling conflicts between Coffman and the travel program caused him to resign from the high school position in 2011.

Austin eventually followed in his father's footsteps and joined the ice hockey team at Ohio State, taking his dad's old number (12). Perry continued with the junior team as another son, Connor, also played for the team. Even after Connor moved up to the U-18 team, Perry remained as coach until 2017 when he hung up his whistle.

== Statistics ==
=== Regular season and playoffs ===
			Regular Season					Playoffs
Season	Team	League	GP	G	A	Pts	PIM	GP	G	A	Pts	PIM
1977–78	Kingston Canadians	OMJHL	2	0	0	0	0	—	—	—	—	—
1978–79	Kingston Canadians	OMJHL	—	—	—	—	—	—	—	—	—	—
1979–80	North York Rangers	OPJHL	—	—	—	—	—	—	—	—	—	—
1980–81	Ohio State	CCHA	37	9	15	24	62	—	—	—	—	—
1981–82	Ohio State	CCHA	34	8	8	16	24	—	—	—	—	—
1982–83	Ohio State	CCHA	40	29	26	55	36	—	—	—	—	—
1983–84	Ohio State	CCHA	41	39	40	79	28	—	—	—	—	—
1984–85	Sherbrooke Canadiens	AHL	69	10	18	28	16	13	1	1	2	0
1985–86	Sherbrooke Canadiens	AHL	67	12	19	31	15	—	—	—	—	—
1986–87	Fort Wayne Komets	IHL	82	30	31	61	31	11	5	3	8	4
NCAA totals			152	85	89	174	150	—	—	—	—	—
AHL totals			136	22	37	59	31	13	1	1	2	0

== Awards and honors ==
Award	Year
All-CCHA Second Team	1983–84
AHCA West Second-Team All-American	1983–84
