= Jim Witherspoon =

Canadian ice hockey player

- Born: October 3, 1951 (age 74) Toronto, Ontario, Canada
- Height: 6 ft 3 in (191 cm)
- Weight: 205 lb (93 kg; 14 st 9 lb)
- Position: Defence
- Shot: Right
- Played for: Los Angeles Kings
- NHL draft: Undrafted
- Playing career: 1974–1978

James Witherspoon (born October 3, 1951) is a Canadian retired professional ice hockey defenceman who played 2 games in the National Hockey League with the Los Angeles Kings during the 1975–76 season. The rest of his career, which lasted from 1974 to 1978, was spent in the minor leagues. Prior to turning professional Witherspoon played for Ohio State University.

== Career statistics ==
=== Regular season and playoffs ===
			Regular season					Playoffs
Season	Team	League	GP	G	A	Pts	PIM	GP	G	A	Pts	PIM
1967–68	Newmarket Orioles	OHA-B	—	—	—	—	—	—	—	—	—	—
1968–69	Markham Waxers	MetJBHL	—	—	—	—	—	—	—	—	—	—
1969–70	Newmarket Redmen	OHA-C	—	—	—	—	—	—	—	—	—	—
1970–71	Ohio State University	NCAA	29	4	10	14	107	—	—	—	—	—
1971–72	Ohio State University	CCHA	29	3	22	25	64	—	—	—	—	—
1972–73	Ohio State University	CCHA	25	6	23	29	80	—	—	—	—	—
1973–74	Ohio State University	CCHA	31	7	26	33	52	—	—	—	—	—
1974–75	Springfield Indians	AHL	61	3	9	12	33	16	0	1	1	4
1975–76	Los Angeles Kings	NHL	2	0	0	0	2	—	—	—	—	—
1975–76	Fort Worth Texans	CHL	61	0	13	13	13	—	—	—	—	—
1976–77	Fort Worth Texans	CHL	30	1	4	5	69	—	—	—	—	—
1977–78	Springfield Indians	AHL	13	0	3	3	27	16	0	1	1	4
AHL totals			74	3	12	15	60	32	0	2	2	8
CHL totals			91	1	17	18	82	—	—	—	—	—
NHL totals			2	0	0	0	2	—	—	—	—	—

== Awards and honours ==
Award	Year
CCHA All-Tournament Team	1972
All-CCHA Second Team	1972-73
