= Ohio State Buckeyes men's ice hockey =

Men's ice hockey team of Ohio State University

- Current season
- University: Ohio State University
- Conference: Big Ten
- Head coach: Steve Rohlik; 14th season, 221–177–45 (.550)
- Assistant coaches: J. B. Bittner; Paul Kirtland; Carter Krier
- Arena: Schottenstein Center; Columbus, Ohio
- Colors: Scarlet and gray

NCAA tournament Frozen Four
- 1998, 2018

NCAA tournament appearances
- 1998, 1999, 2003, 2004, 2005, 2009, 2017, 2018, 2019, 2023, 2025

Conference tournament champions
- CCHA: 1972, 2004

Conference regular season champions
- CCHA: 1972; Big Ten: 2019

Current uniform
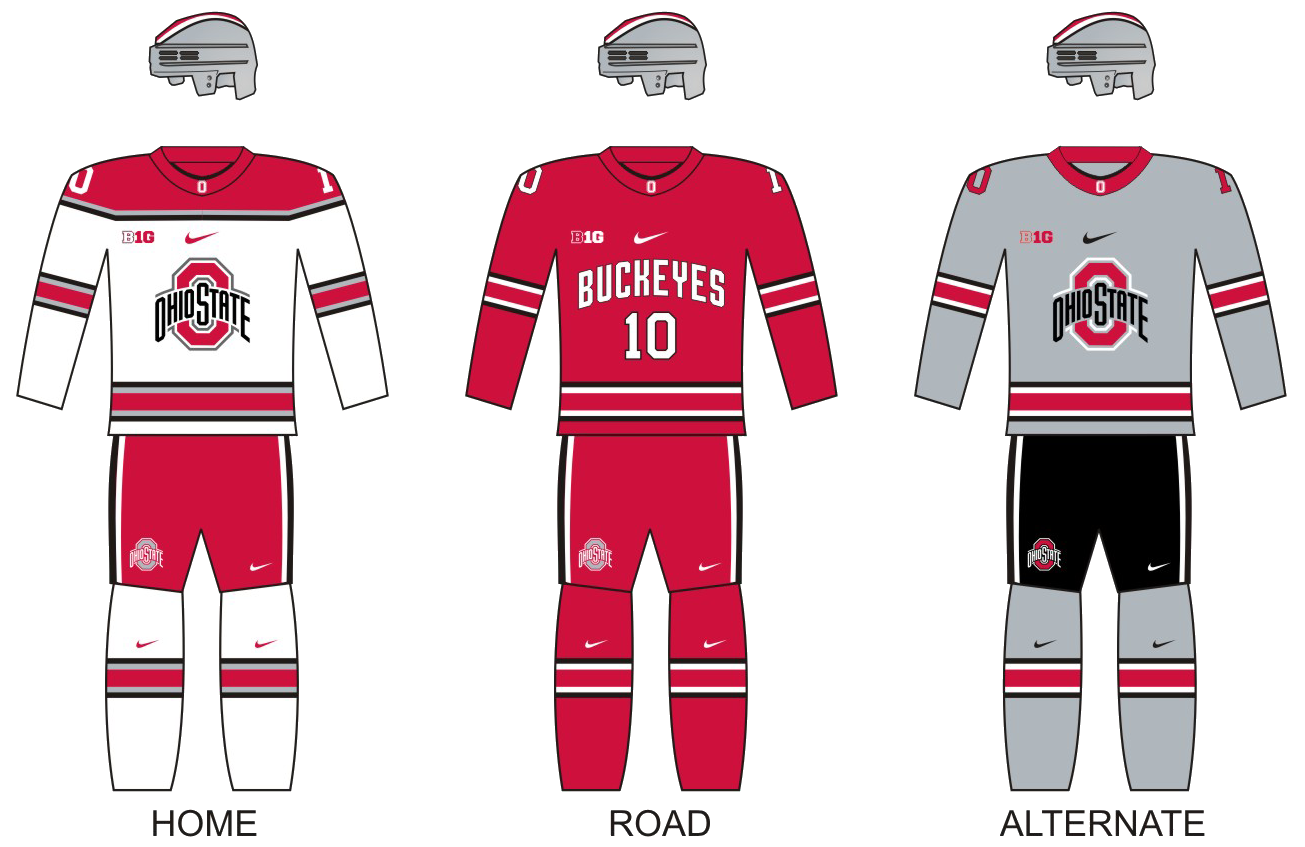

The Ohio State Buckeyes men's ice hockey is the team playing in the NCAA Division I level of college ice hockey as the program that represents The Ohio State University. The Buckeyes are a member of the Big Ten Conference. They play at Schottenstein Center in Columbus, Ohio.

== History ==
The Ohio State Buckeyes men's ice hockey program began playing in 1963, as the team played at the new Ohio State Ice Rink, constructed in 1961. The Buckeyes were a founding member of the CCHA in 1971. The Buckeyes won the inaugural 1972 CCHA men's ice hockey tournament with a 3–0 win over Saint Louis University.

One of the team's most successful seasons came in 1997–1998, the year before the Buckeyes moved into new the 17,500-seat Value City Arena, which replaced the aging and undersized (1,400-seat) Ohio State Ice Rink. The team finished the 1997–1998 season with an overall record of 27–13–2. They secured an at-large bid to the 1998 tournament. That same season the Buckeyes advanced to the 1998 Frozen Four and lost in the semifinal game to Boston College 5–2. The 1998 tournament was the program's first of two all-time Frozen Four appearances, the other coming in 2018. In 1999 the team advanced to the 1999 NCAA tournament. Despite a first round elimination with a 4–2 loss to Maine, this marked the first time in school history the team made the NCAA tournament in consecutive seasons.

The time period during the early 2000s was the most successful period in the program's history. Ohio State made the NCAA Post season tournament in 2003, 2004, and 2005. The 2003–2004 season also saw the Buckeyes win the school's second CCHA post season tournament with a 4–2 win over Big Ten and CCHA rival Michigan. After three seasons, the Buckeyes returned to the NCAA tournament in 2009, when they received an at-large bid to the 2009 NCAA tournament after a 5th-place finish in the CCHA regular season and falling to Alaska in the CCHA Quarterfinals. In the 2009 NCAA tournament the team lost 8–3 to Boston University in the first round. The program was also invited to play in the Frozen Tundra Hockey Classic against Wisconsin on February 11, 2006, which was the second-ever outdoor ice hockey game played between college teams.

On March 21, 2011 the Big Ten Conference announced plans to sponsor men's ice hockey starting in 2013–14 season. Ohio State along with CCHA rivals, Michigan and Michigan State would leave the CCHA to join Minnesota and Wisconsin from the WCHA and Penn State, who would elevate their men's and women's American Collegiate Hockey Association club programs to varsity status, to form a six-team Big Ten Hockey Conference.

During the first half of the 2011–2012 season, the Buckeyes jumped out to a sizeable lead in the CCHA standings when the team recorded a 10–3–1 conference record. The second half of the season proved much harder for Ohio State when the team recorded an eleven-game winless streak through January and the first half of February. The team broke the streak with a 4–3 win over Western Michigan, the team's lone win in the second half of the season. The Buckeyes fell from a season high, second-place ranking in January 2012 to 21st place by the end of the regular season. In the first round of the 2012 CCHA tournament, Ohio State was swept by Notre Dame 2–0 and 4–2 in the best-of-three series.

Despite an up and down 2013–14 season, Ohio State had a good showing in the inaugural Big Ten Hockey tournament. After defeating Michigan State in overtime in the first round, the Buckeyes upset #1 Minnesota 3–1. They ultimately fell 5–4 in overtime in the championship game to the Wisconsin Badgers. Despite missing out on the NCAA tournament, Ohio State would finish the 2013–14 season ranked #20.

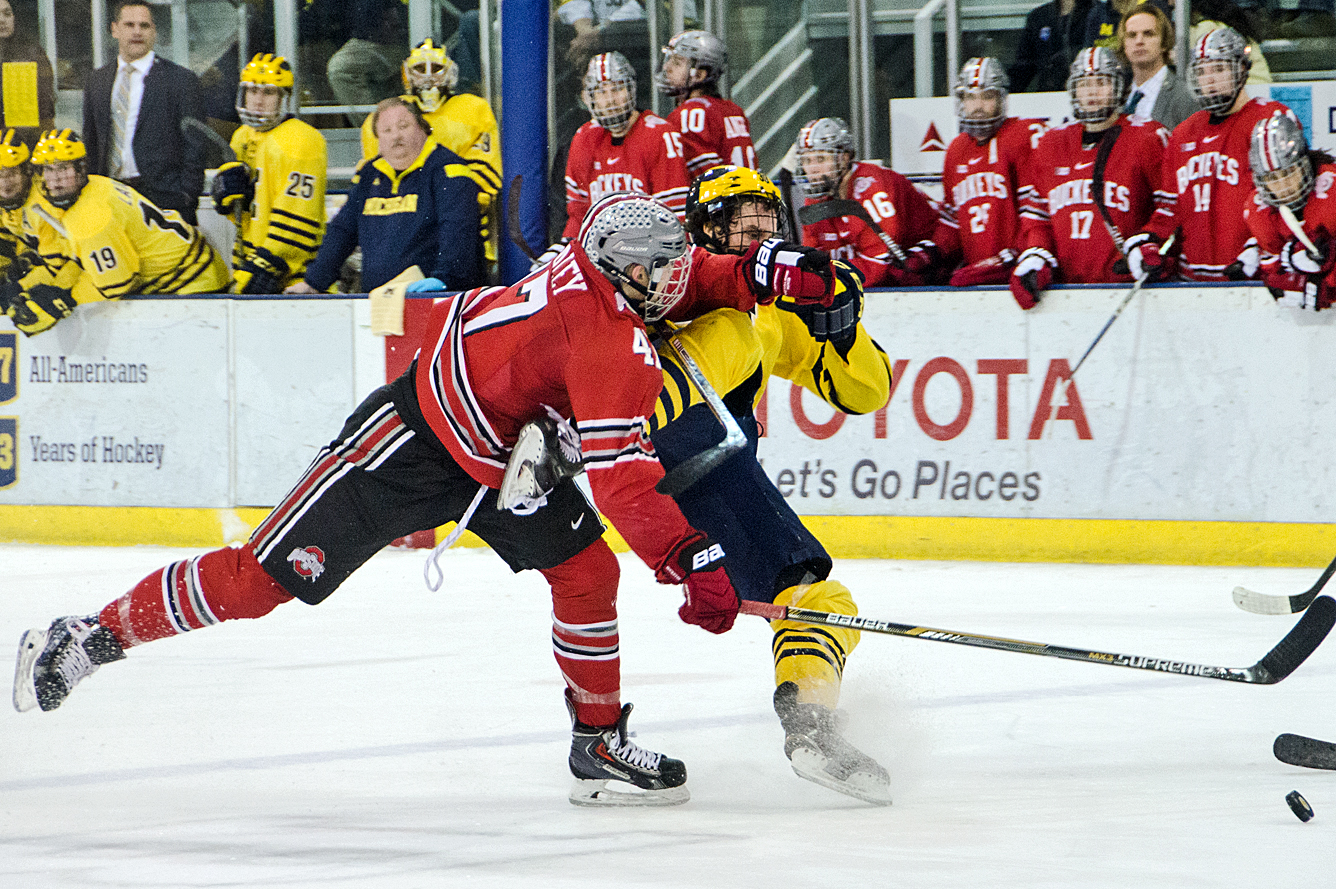
A game between Ohio State and Michigan in 2015

After back to back losing seasons in 2014–15 and 2015–16, Ohio State had their first 20 win season and NCAA tournament berth in 8 years. Led by forwards Nick Schilkey and Mason Jobst, the Buckeyes had the second ranked offense in college hockey and a historically great power play. Ohio State finished third in the Big Ten, their highest finish in the league's four-year history. Despite the successful season, Ohio State did not clinch a tournament berth until Penn State defeated Wisconsin in the 2017 Big Ten tournament, giving the Buckeyes the final at large berth and the 4 seed in the West Regional in Fargo, North Dakota. The Buckeyes faced off against the #2 overall seed, the Minnesota-Duluth Bulldogs in the 1st round. A third period comeback sent the game to overtime with the score tied at two. The Bulldogs ended the Buckeyes season on a goal from Willie Raskob at 11:58 of the first overtime.

== Season-by-season results ==
Source:

== Records vs. Big Ten teams ==
As of the 2021-22 season

School	Team	Away Arena	Overall record	Win %	Home	Away	Last Result
University of Michigan	Wolverines	Yost Ice Arena	44–85–14	.362	23–37–6	18–43–8	3-0 L
Michigan State University	Spartans	Munn Ice Arena	46–89–13	.350	24–36–6	17–47–7	5-1 W
University of Minnesota	Golden Gophers	3M Arena at Mariucci	7–30–4	.225	4–9–1	2–16–3	4-1 L
University of Notre Dame	Fighting Irish	Compton Family Ice Arena	37–36–10	.512	19–16–6	15–18–4	3-2 L
Pennsylvania State University	Nittany Lions	Pegula Ice Arena	16–10–2	.593	8–5–1	7–4–1	4-1 W
University of Wisconsin–Madison	Badgers	Kohl Center	17–18–3	.473	8–6–1	8–6–2	4-3 W

== Coaches ==
The Buckeyes are currently coached by Steve Rohlik. He was announced the new head coach on April 24, 2013 shortly after the departure of Mark Osiecki.

=== All-time coaching records ===
As of completion of 2024–25 season

Tenure	Coach	Years	Record	Pct.
1963–1965	Tom Bedecki	2	6–14–0	.300
1965–1966	Glen Sonmor	1	9–7–0	.563
1966–1970	Harry Neale	4	49–48–3	.505
1970–1972	Dave Chambers	2	44–14–0	.759
1972–1975	Gerald Walford	3	41–46–4	.473
1975–1995	Jerry Welsh	20†	328–381–56	.465
1995–2010	John Markell	15†	280–267–56	.511
2010–2013	Mark Osiecki	3	46–50–16	.482
2013–present	Steve Rohlik	12	221–177–45	.550
Totals	9 coaches	62 seasons	1,024–1,004–180	.505

† John Markell coached the final 9 games of the 1994–95 season after Jerry Welsh resigned.

== Statistical leaders ==
=== Career points leaders ===
Player	Years	GP	G	A	Pts	PIM
Paul Pooley	1980–1984	149	114	156	270	165
Ray Meyers	1970–1974	118	107	126	233	160
Dave Kobryn	1980–1984	154	72	151	223	194
Andy Browne	1980–1984	139	104	108	212	134
Paul Tilley	1976–1980	150	81	131	212	177
Larry Marson	1978–1982	143	82	128	210	49
Bruce Allworth	1973–1976	94	71	114	185	222
Rick Brebant	1984–1987	111	75	108	183	178
Tom Scanlon	1976–1980	145	76	101	177	215
Peter Bartkiewicz	1969–1973	115	86	88	174	68
Perry Pooley	1981–1984	152	85	89	174	151

=== Career goaltending leaders ===
GP = Games played; Min = Minutes played; W = Wins; L = Losses; T = Ties; GA = Goals against; SO = Shutouts; SV% = Save percentage; GAA = Goals against average

minimum 30 games played

Player	Years	GP	Min	W	L	T	GA	SO	SV%	GAA
Dave Caruso	2002–2006	96	5640	52	32	9	195	9	.919	2.07
Brady Hjelle	2011–2013	42	2361	16	18	6	82	5	.933	2.08
Sean Romeo	2017–2019	54	3189	30	17	7	118	5	.919	2.22
Jakub Dobeš	2021–2023	75	4405	42	28	5	168	6	.926	2.29
Tommy Nappier	2017–2021	82	4678	40	30	8	180	8	.925	2.31

Statistics current through the end of the 2023–24 season.

== Players ==
=== Current roster ===
As of August 18, 2025.

No.	Nat.	Player	Class	Pos	Height	Weight	DoB	Hometown	Previous team	NHL rights
1	(Canada)	Dawson Labre	Freshman	G	6' 3" (1.91 m)	185 lb (84 kg)	2004-06-22	Les Cèdres, Quebec	West Kelowna Warriors (BCHL)	—
2	(United States)	Chris Able	Sophomore	D	6' 1" (1.85 m)	198 lb (90 kg)	2004-11-04	Libertyville, Illinois	Chicago Steel (USHL)	—
5	(United States)	Ethan Straky	Senior	F	5' 11" (1.8 m)	181 lb (82 kg)	2003-04-18	Walnut Creek, California	Colorado College (NCHC)	—
7	(United States)	Chris Romaine	Sophomore	D	6' 0" (1.83 m)	196 lb (89 kg)	2004-02-21	Boston, Massachusetts	Green Bay Gamblers (USHL)	COL, 193rd overall 2022
8	(United States)	Nathan McBrayer	Junior	D	6' 0" (1.83 m)	173 lb (78 kg)	2004-05-11	Dublin, Ohio	Muskegon Lumberjacks (USHL)	—
9	(Canada)	Riley Thompson	Junior	F	6' 3" (1.91 m)	190 lb (86 kg)	2002-08-17	Orleans, Ontario	Alaska Anchorage (NCAA)	—
10	(United States)	Thomas Weis	Junior	F	5' 9" (1.75 m)	170 lb (77 kg)	2002-02-08	Madison, Wisconsin	Madison Capitols (USHL)	—
11	(Canada)	Jake Rozzi	Sophomore	F	6' 0" (1.83 m)	183 lb (83 kg)	2004-01-27	Kirkland, Quebec	Tri-City Storm (USHL)	—
13	(Canada)	Félix Caron	Sophomore	F	6' 0" (1.83 m)	168 lb (76 kg)	2004-12-01	Terrebonne, Quebec	Rensselaer (ECAC)	—
15	(United States)	Adam Eisele	Graduate	F	6' 1" (1.85 m)	190 lb (86 kg)	2001-07-11	Lake Elmo, Minnesota	Minnesota State (CCHA)	—
16	(United States)	Max Montes	Junior	F	5' 8" (1.73 m)	165 lb (75 kg)	2003-09-01	Hartland, Wisconsin	Dubuque Fighting Saints (USHL)	—
17	(United States)	Landen Gunderson	Freshman	F	6' 1" (1.85 m)	190 lb (86 kg)	2004-11-28	Plymouth, Minnesota	Sioux City Musketeers (USHL)	—
19	(South Korea)	James Hong	Sophomore	F	5' 9" (1.75 m)	168 lb (76 kg)	2004-07-02	Irvine, California	Madison Capitols (USHL)	—
21	(United States)	Bryce Ingles	Freshman	D	5' 9" (1.75 m)	181 lb (82 kg)	2005-06-08	Clyde, Michigan	Sioux Falls Stampede (USHL)	—
23	(United States)	Davis Burnside	Senior	F	6' 0" (1.83 m)	176 lb (80 kg)	2003-09-22	Scottsdale, Arizona	Dubuque Fighting Saints (USHL)	—
24	(Canada)	Niall Crocker	Freshman	F	6' 4" (1.93 m)	196 lb (89 kg)	2004-07-31	Delta, British Columbia	Prince Albert Raiders (WHL)	—
25	(United States)	Sam Deckhut	Junior	F	5' 11" (1.8 m)	186 lb (84 kg)	2002-04-02	San Diego, California	Sioux City Musketeers (USHL)	—
27	(Canada)	Sam McGinley	Junior	D	6' 3" (1.91 m)	165 lb (75 kg)	2002-12-03	Calgary, Alberta	New Brunswick (AUS)	—
28	(United States)	William Smith	Junior	D	6' 1" (1.85 m)	193 lb (88 kg)	2003-03-29	Toronto, Ontario	Omaha Lancers (USHL)	—
29	(United States)	Ryan Gordon	Junior	F	6' 0" (1.83 m)	185 lb (84 kg)	2002-05-05	Duluth, Georgia	Sioux Falls Stampede (USHL)	—
30	(United States)	Sam Hillebrandt	Freshman	G	6' 1" (1.85 m)	170 lb (77 kg)	2005-02-21	Port Huron, Michigan	Barrie Colts (OHL)	—
49	(Canada)	Jake Karabela	Freshman	F	5' 11" (1.8 m)	187 lb (85 kg)	2004-03-07	Guelph, Ontario	Guelph Storm (OHL)	WSH, 149th overall 2022
60	(United States)	Kristoffer Eberly	Junior	G	6' 4" (1.93 m)	208 lb (94 kg)	2002-12-10	Pinckney, Michigan	Green Bay Gamblers (USHL)	—
63	(United States)	Nathan Lewis	Sophomore	F	6' 6" (1.98 m)	209 lb (95 kg)	2004-07-27	Chicago, Illinois	Youngstown Phantoms (USHL)	—
73	(United States)	Broten Sabo	Junior	D	6' 2" (1.88 m)	194 lb (88 kg)	2002-08-09	Rosemount, Minnesota	Alaska (NCAA)	—
91	(United States)	Jake Dunlap	Senior	F	5' 9" (1.75 m)	175 lb (79 kg)	2001-12-05	Windham, New Hampshire	New Hampshire (HEA)	—

== Awards and honors ==
=== NCAA ===
==== Individual awards ====
Derek Hines Unsung Hero Award

- Brendon Kearney: 2019

NCAA Scoring Champion

- Paul Pooley: 1984

==== All-Americans ====
AHCA First Team All-Americans

- 1983-84: Paul Pooley, F
- 1997-98: Hugo Boisvert, F
- 2012-13: Brady Hjelle, G
- 2013-14: Ryan Dzingel, F

AHCA Second Team All-Americans

- 1983-84: Perry Pooley, F
- 1998-99: Jeff Maund, G; Hugo Boisvert, F
- 2002-03: R. J. Umberger, F
- 2009-10: Zac Dalpe, F
- 2016-17: Mason Jobst, F
- 2017-18: Tanner Laczysnki, F
- 2018-19: Mason Jobst, F

=== CCHA ===
==== Individual awards ====
Player of the Year

- Paul Pooley: 1984

Perani Cup

- Brady Hjelle: 2013

Best Defensive Defenseman

- Doug Andress: 2004

Ilitch Humanitarian Award

- Mike Betz: 2003

Coach of the Year

- Jerry Welsh: 1983
- John Markell: 1998

Rookie of the Year

- Paul Pooley: 1981
- Brian Loney: 1992
- R. J. Umberger: 2001

Terry Flanagan Memorial Award

- Scott Titus: 2002
- Tom Fritsche: 2007

Best Goaltender

- Mike Betz: 2003
- Brady Hjelle: 2013

Tournament Most Valuable Player

- Bill McKenzie: 1972
- Paul Caponigri: 2004

==== All-Conference Teams ====
First Team All-CCHA

- 1972–73: Ray Meyers, F
- 1975–76: Bruce Allworth, F
- 1978–79: Paul Tilley, F
- 1980–81: Mike Blake, G; Dan Mandich, D; Brent Morrow, F
- 1982–83: Andy Browne, F
- 1983–84: John Dougan, G; Paul Pooley, F
- 1997–98: Hugo Boisvert, F
- 1998–99: Jeff Maund, G; Hugo Boisvert, F
- 2002–03: R. J. Umberger, F
- 2009–10: Zac Dalpe, F
- 2012–13: Brady Hjelle, G

Second Team All-CCHA

- 1972–73: Jim Witherspoon, D
- 1976–77: Paul Tilley, F
- 1978–79: Steve Jones, G
- 1979–80: Steve Jones, G; Brian Jenks, D; Greg Kostenko, D; Rod McNair, D; Larry Marson, F; Paul Tilley, F
- 1980–81: Paul Pooley, F
- 1981–82: Larry Marson, F
- 1982–83: John Dougan, G; Dave Kobryn, F
- 1983–84: Perry Pooley, F
- 1984–85: Mike Rousseau, D
- 1995–96: Tom Sakey, G
- 1998–99: Andrè Signoretti, D
- 2002–03: Mike Betz, G
- 2004–05: Nate Guenin, D; Rod Pelley, F
- 2006–07: Sean Collins, F
- 2012–13: Tanner Fritz, F

CCHA All-Rookie Team

- 1989–90: Glenn Painter, D
- 1991–92: Brian Loney, F
- 1996–97: Hugo Boisvert, F
- 1997–98: Jeff Maund, G
- 1998–99: Jason Crain, D
- 2000–01: Dave Steckel, F; R. J. Umberger, F
- 2004–05: Tom Fritsche, F
- 2008–09: Matt Bartkowski, D; Zac Dalpe, F
- 2011–12: Max McCormick, F

=== Big Ten ===
==== Individual awards ====
Defensive player of the year

- Sasha Larocque: 2019

Goaltender of the Year

- Tommy Nappier: 2019
- Jakub Dobeš: 2022

Freshman of the Year

- Jakub Dobeš: 2022

Coach of the Year

- Steve Rohlik: 2018, 2019, 2025

==== All-Conference Teams ====
First Team All-Big Ten

- 2013–14: Ryan Dzingel, F
- 2015–16: Josh Healey, D
- 2016–17: Mason Jobst, F
- 2017–18: Tanner Laczynski, F
- 2018–19: Tommy Nappier, G
- 2021–22: Jakub Dobeš, G; Georgii Merkulov, F

Second Team All-Big Ten

- 2015–16: Nick Schilkey, F
- 2016–17: Christian Frey, G; Josh Healey, D; Nick Schilkey, F
- 2017–18: Sean Romeo, G; Sasha Larocque, D; Mason Jobst, F
- 2018–19: Sasha Larocque, D
- 2022–23: Mason Lohrei, D; Jake Wise, F
- 2023–24: Scooter Brickey, D

Big Ten All-Rookie Team

- 2013–14: Christian Frey, G; Drew Brevig, D; Nick Schilkey, F
- 2014–15: Matthew Weis, F
- 2015–16: Mason Jobst, F
- 2017–18: Tommy Nappier, G
- 2018–19: Gustaf Westlund, F
- 2021–22: Jakub Dobeš, G; Mason Lohrei, D; Georgii Merkulov, F

== Ohio State Buckeyes Hall of Fame ==
The following is a list of people associated with the Ohio State men's ice hockey program who were elected into the Ohio State Buckeyes Hall of Fame.

- Hugo Boisvert
- Jamie Macoun
- Bill McKenzie
- Paul Pooley
- Paul Tilley
- RJ Umberger
- Jerry Welsh

== Olympians ==
This is a list of Ohio State alumni who have played on an Olympic team.

Name	Position	Ohio State Tenure	Team	Year	Finish
Andrè Signoretti	Defenseman	1997–2001	(Italy) ITA	2006	11th
Ryan Kesler	Center	2002–2003	(United States) USA	2010	Silver
Matt Tomkins	Goaltender	2013–2017	(Canada) CAN	2022	6th

== Buckeyes in the NHL ==
As of July 1, 2025.

= NHL All-Star team	= NHL All-Star	= NHL All-Star and NHL All-Star team	= Hall of Famers

Player	Position	Team(s)	Years	Games	Stanley Cups
John Albert	Center	WIN	2013–2014	9	0
Tom Askey	Goaltender	ANA	1997–1999	7	0
Mike Bales	Goaltender	BOS, OTT	1992–1997	23	0
Matt Bartkowski	Defenseman	BOS, VAN, CGY, MIN	2010–2021	256	0
Mike Blake	Goaltender	LAK	1981–1984	40	0
Sean Collins	Defenseman	WSH	2008–2012	21	0
Zac Dalpe	Center	CAR, VAN, BUF, MIN, CBJ, FLA	2010–2023	168	0
Jakub Dobeš	Goaltender	MTL	2024–Present	16	0
Ryan Dzingel	Center	OTT, CBJ, CAR, ARI, SJS	2015–2022	404	0
Corey Elkins	Center	LAK	2009–2010	3	0
Tanner Fritz	Center	NYI	2017–2019	42	0
Anthony Greco	Right wing	FLA, NYR	2018–2022	2	0
Nate Guenin	Center	PHI, PIT, CBJ, ANA, COL	2006–2016	205	0
Dave Gust	Right Wing	CHI	2022–2023	4	0
Cal Heeter	Goaltender	PHI	2013–2014	1	0
Dakota Joshua	Center	STL, VAN	2020–Present	241	0
Ryan Kesler	Center	VAN, ANA	2003–2019	1,001	0
Tanner Laczynski	Center	PHI, VGK	2020–Present	46	0
Mason Lohrei	Defenseman	BOS	2023–Present	118	0

Player	Position	Team(s)	Years	Games	Stanley Cups
Brian Loney	Right wing	VAN	1995–1996	12	0
Jamie Macoun	Defenseman	CGY, TOR, DET	1982–1999	1,128	2
Jeff Madill	Right wing	NJD	1990–1991	14	0
Dan Mandich	Defenseman	MNS	1982–1986	111	0
Max McCormick	Left wing	OTT, CAR, SEA	2015–2024	94	0
Bill McKenzie	Goaltender	DET, KCS, COR	1973–1980	91	0
Cole McWard	Defenseman	VAN	2022–2024	6	0
Éric Meloche	Right wing	PIT, PHI	2001–2007	74	0
Georgii Merkulov	Center	BOS	2023–Present	10	0
Carson Meyer	Right wing	CBJ	2021–2024	41	0
Rod Pelley	Center	NJD, ANA	2006–2012	256	0
Paul Pooley	Forward	WPG	1984–1986	15	0
Shane Sims	Defenseman	NYI	2010–2011	1	0
Dave Steckel	Center	WSH, NJD, TOR, ANA	2005–2014	425	0
Tyson Strachan	Defenseman	STL, FLA, WSH, BUF, MIN	2008–2016	186	0
Matt Tomkins	Goaltender	TBL	2023–2024	6	0
R. J. Umberger	Left wing	PHI, CBJ	2005–2016	779	0
Jim Witherspoon	Defenseman	LAK	1975–1976	2	0

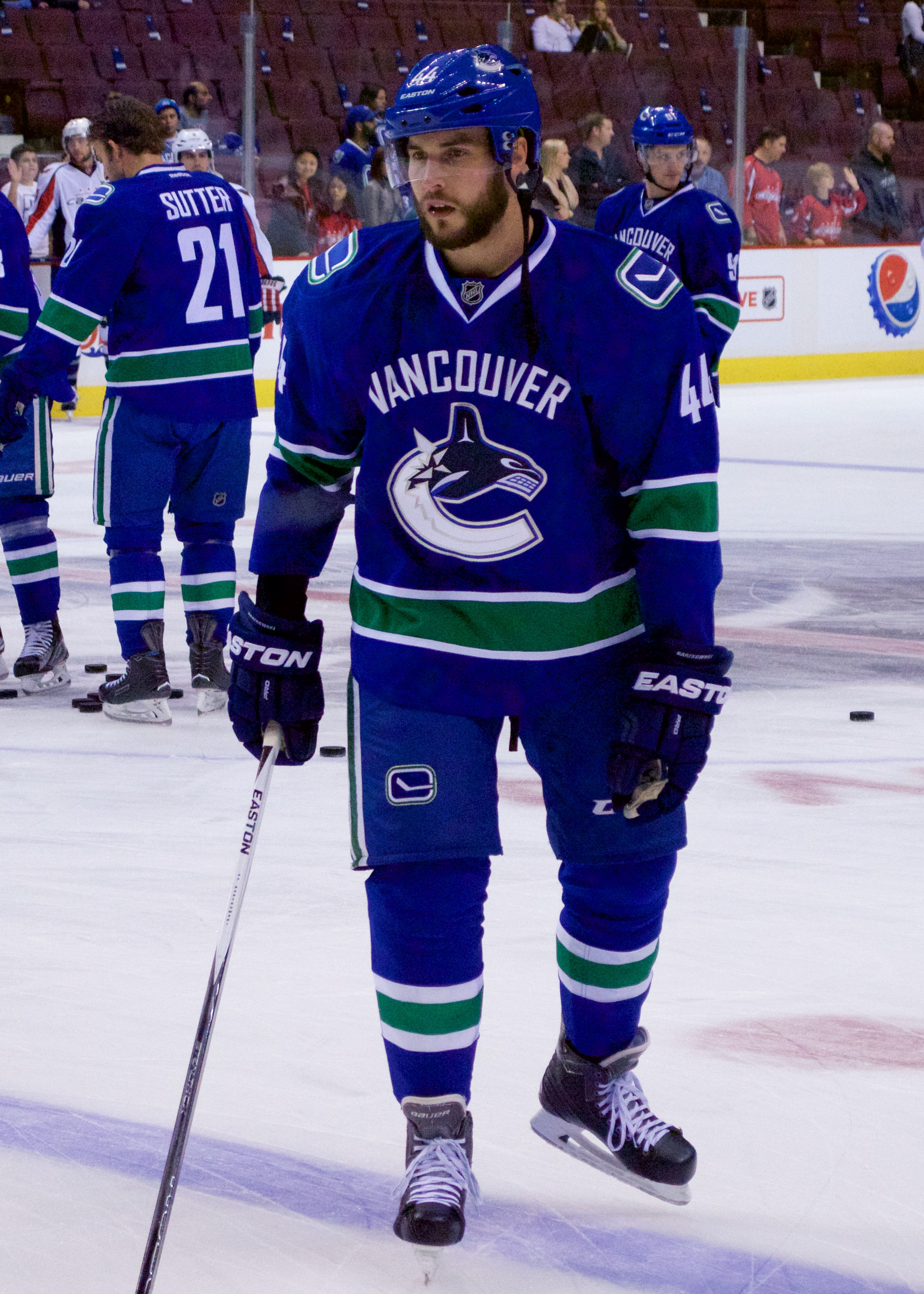
Matt Bartkowski

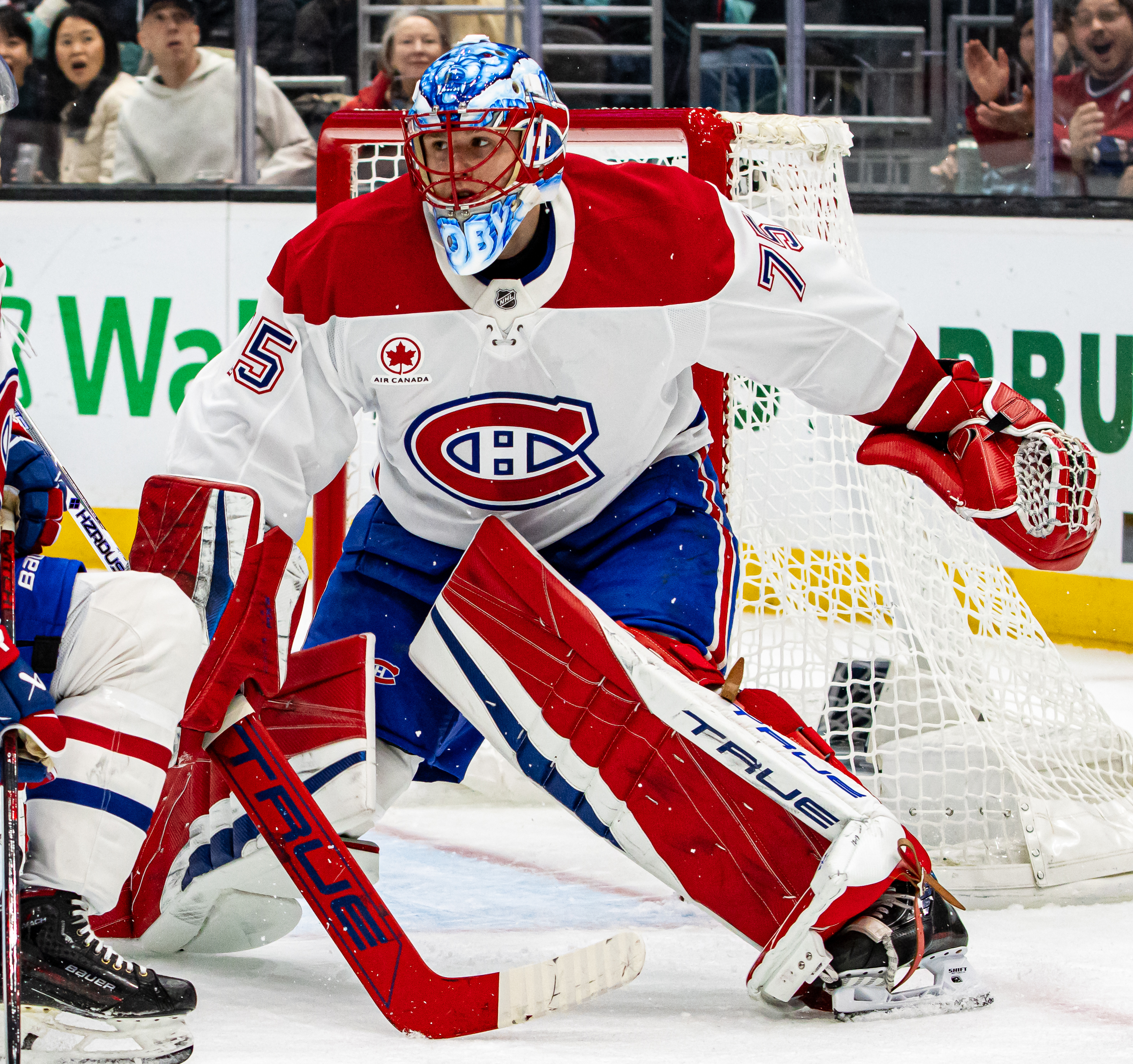
Jakub Dobeš

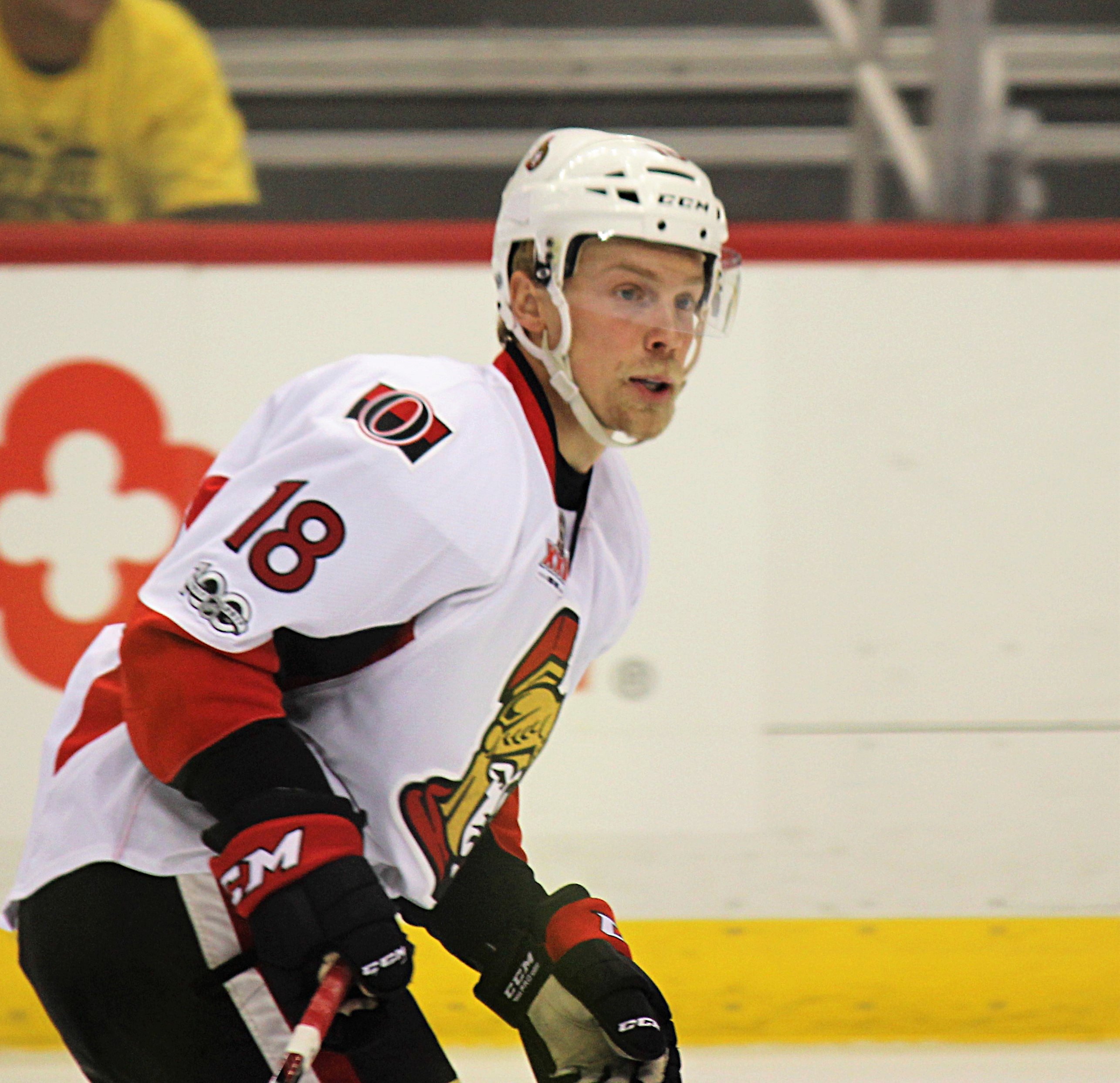
Ryan Dzingel

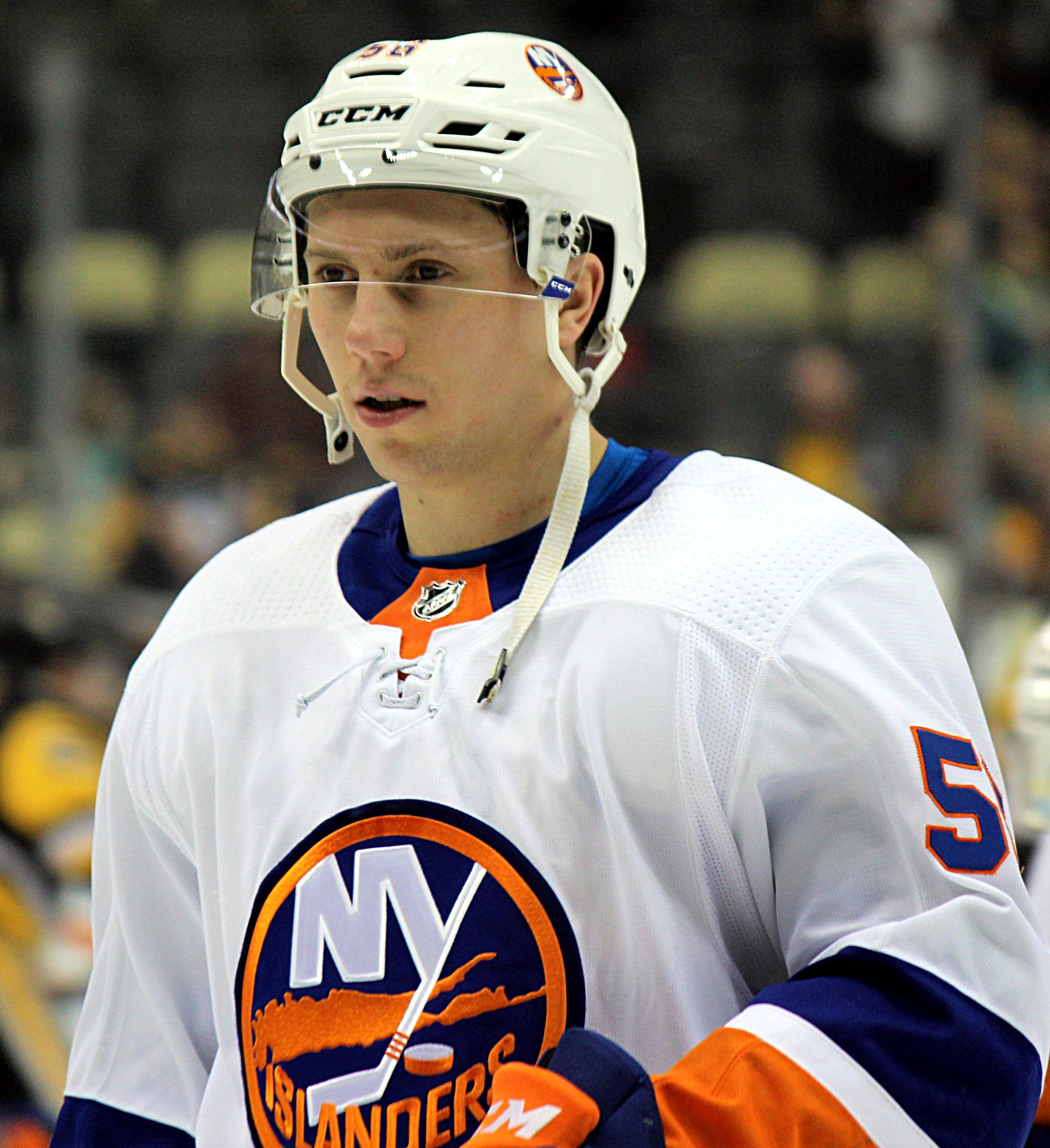
Tanner Fritz

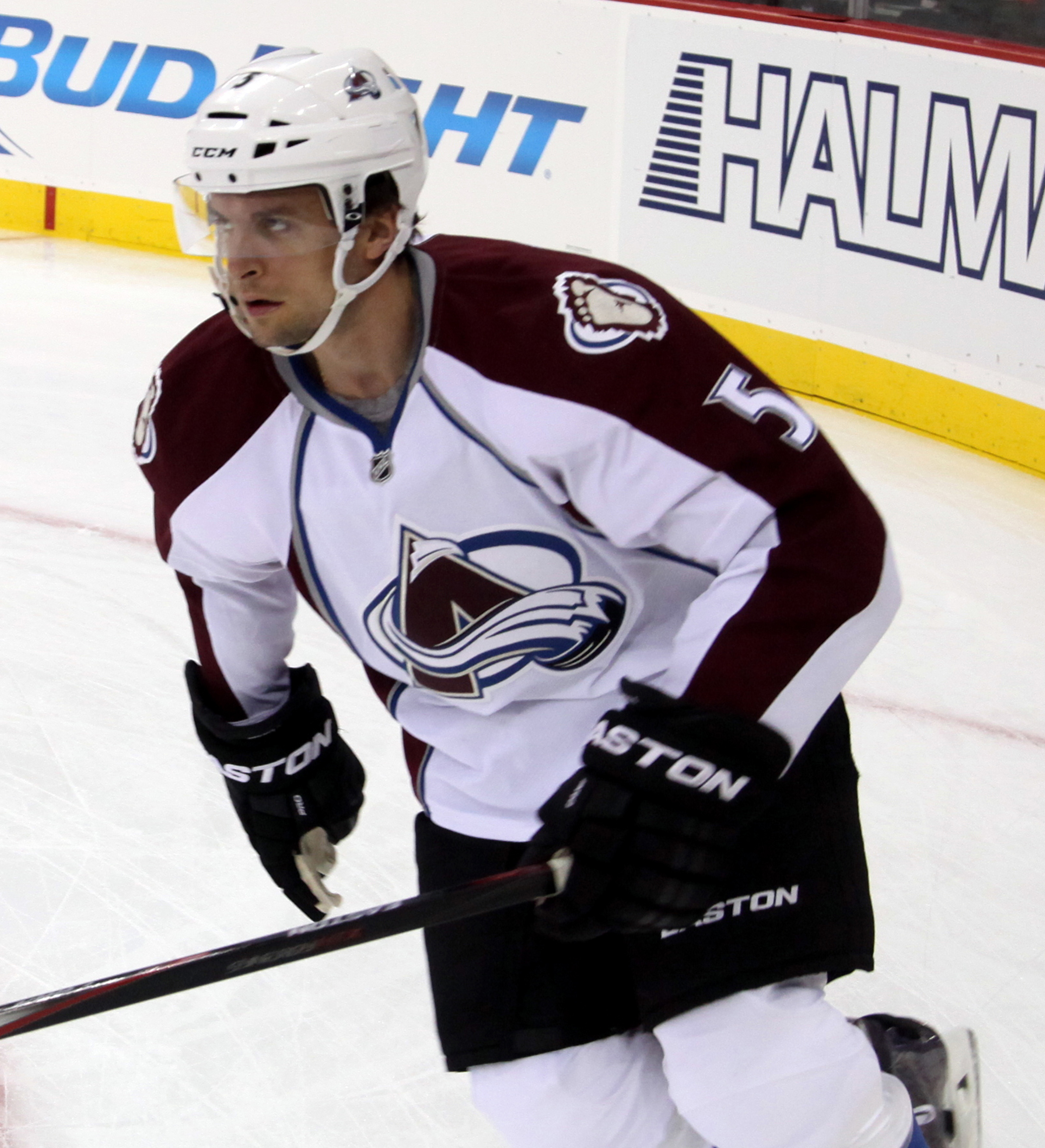
Nate Guenin

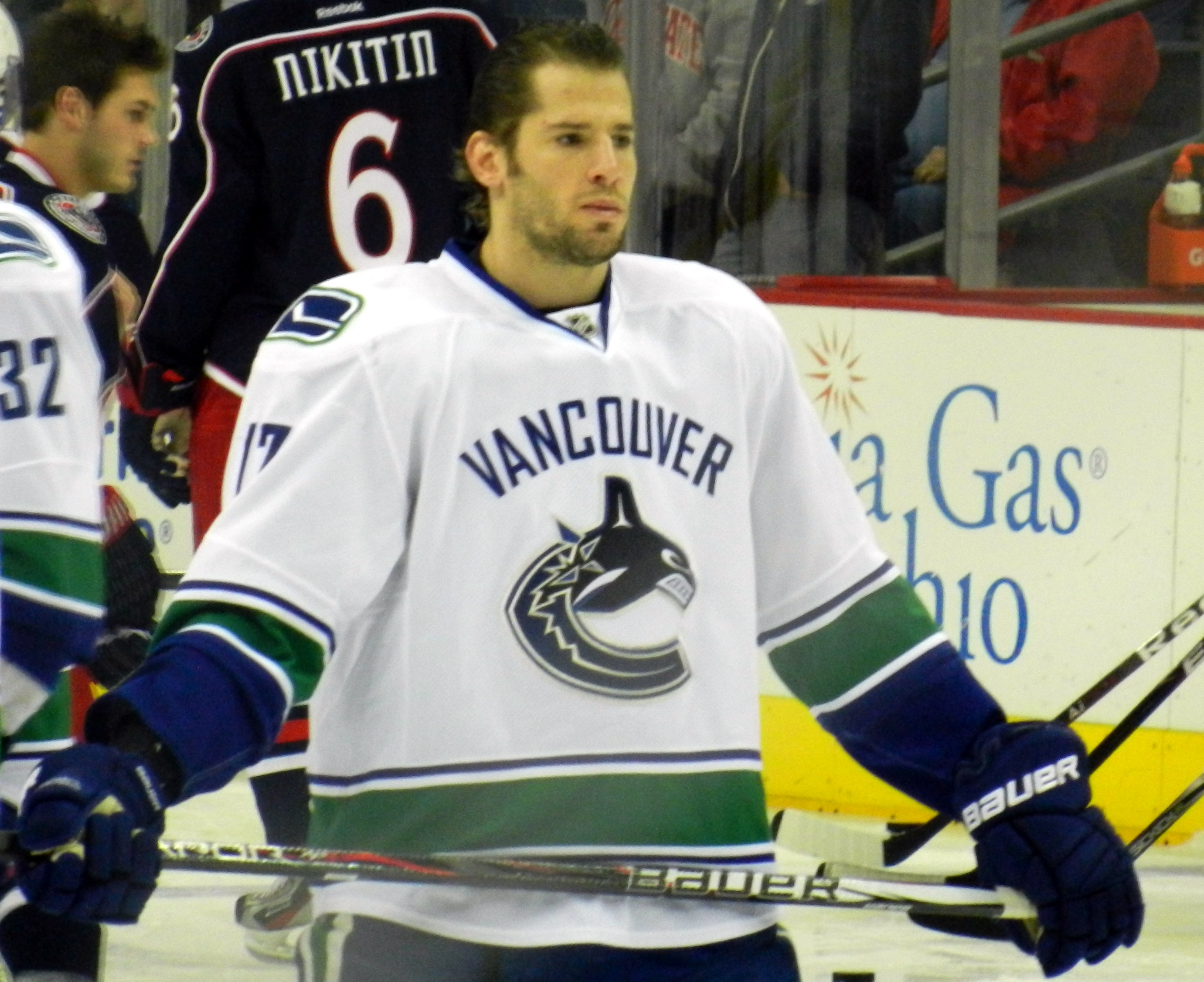
Ryan Kesler

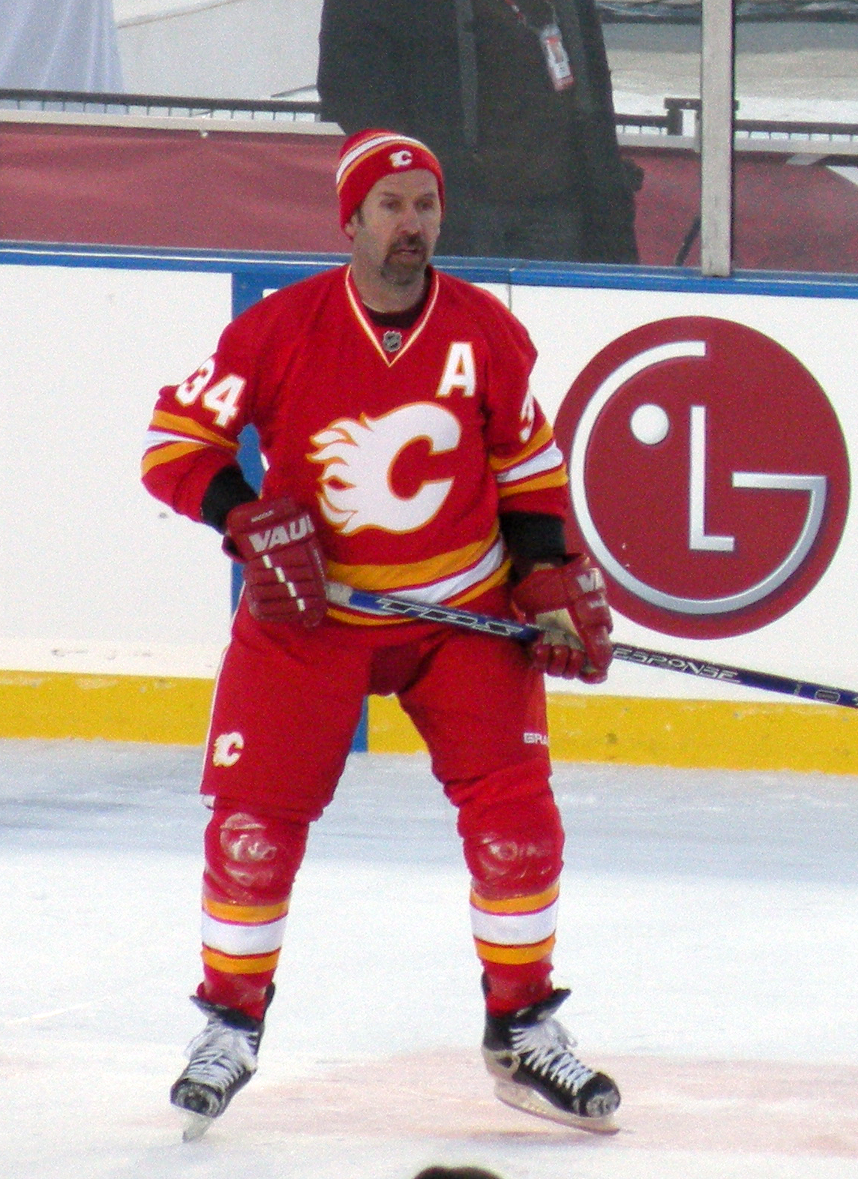
Jamie Macoun

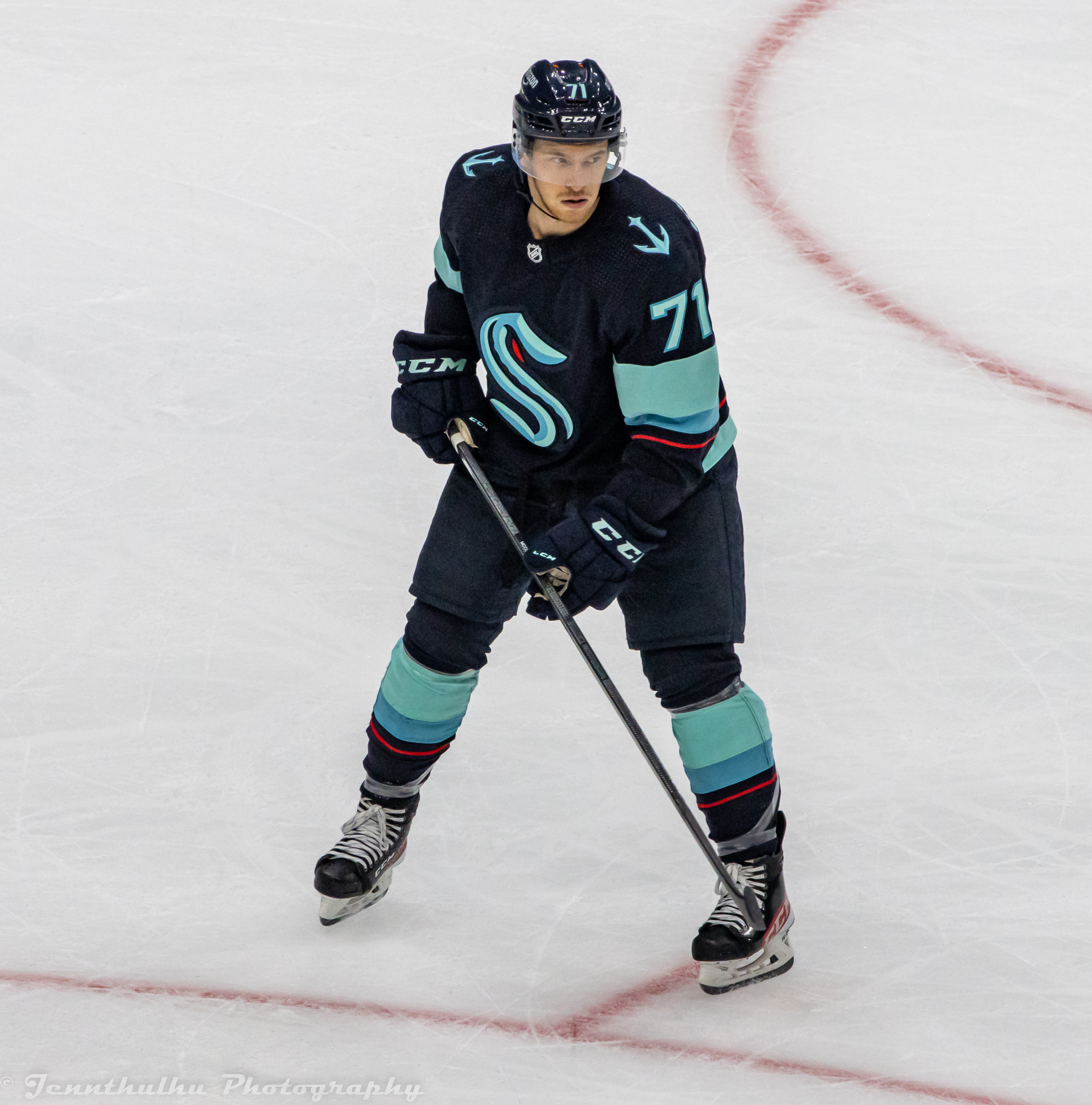
Max McCormick

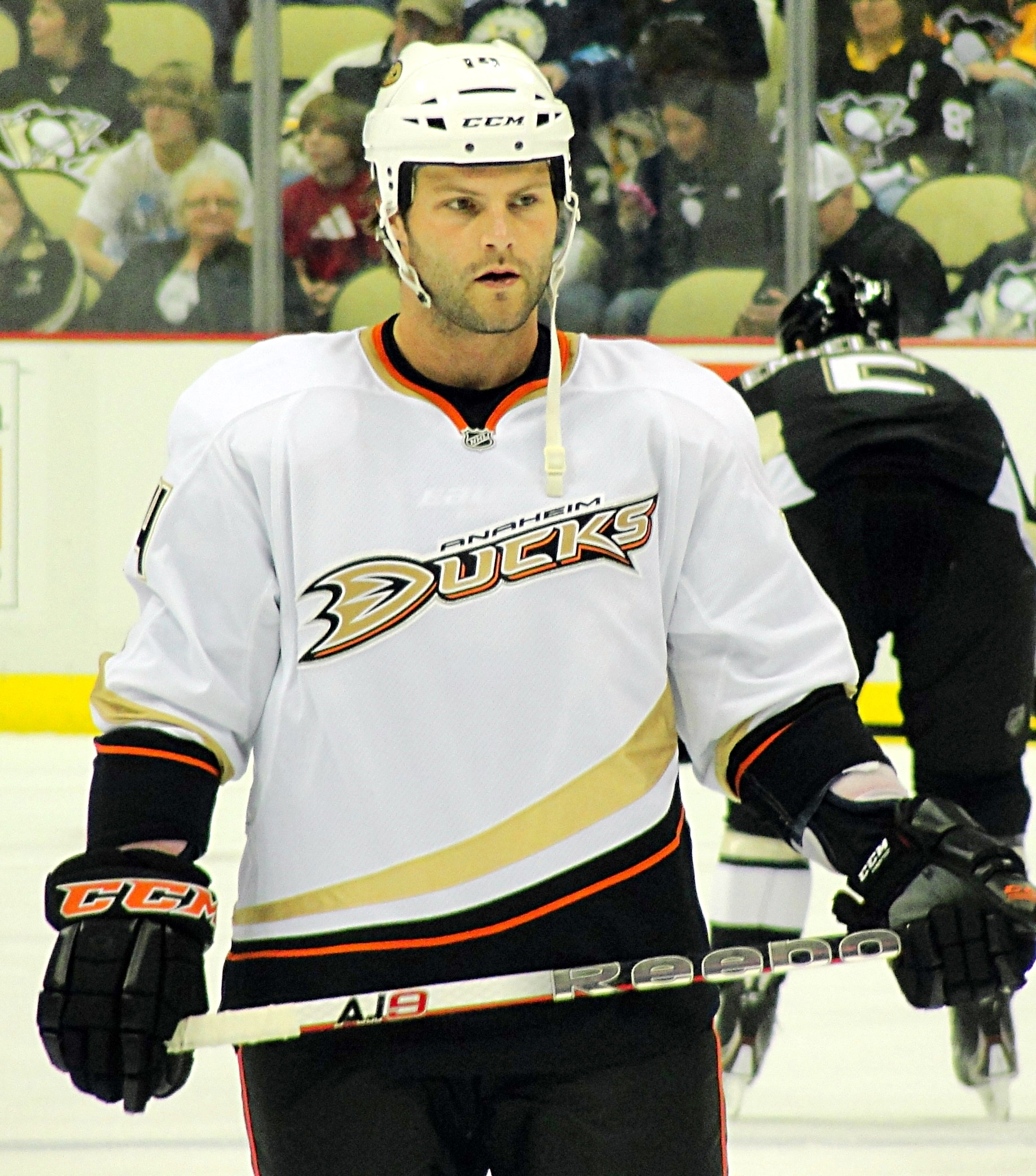
Rod Pelley

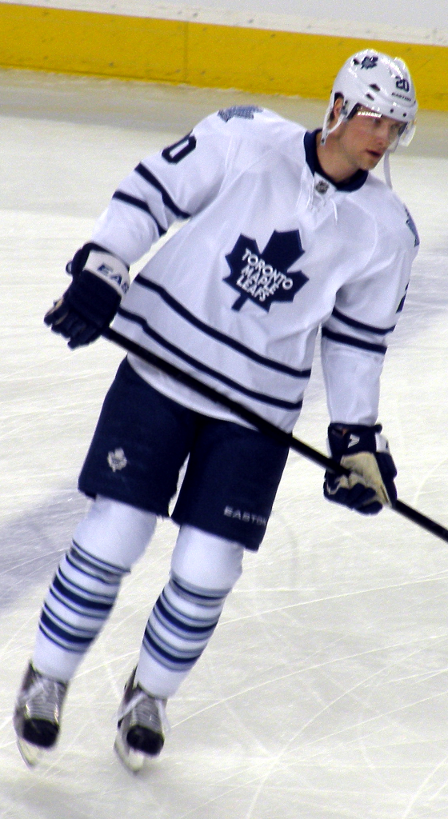
Dave Steckel

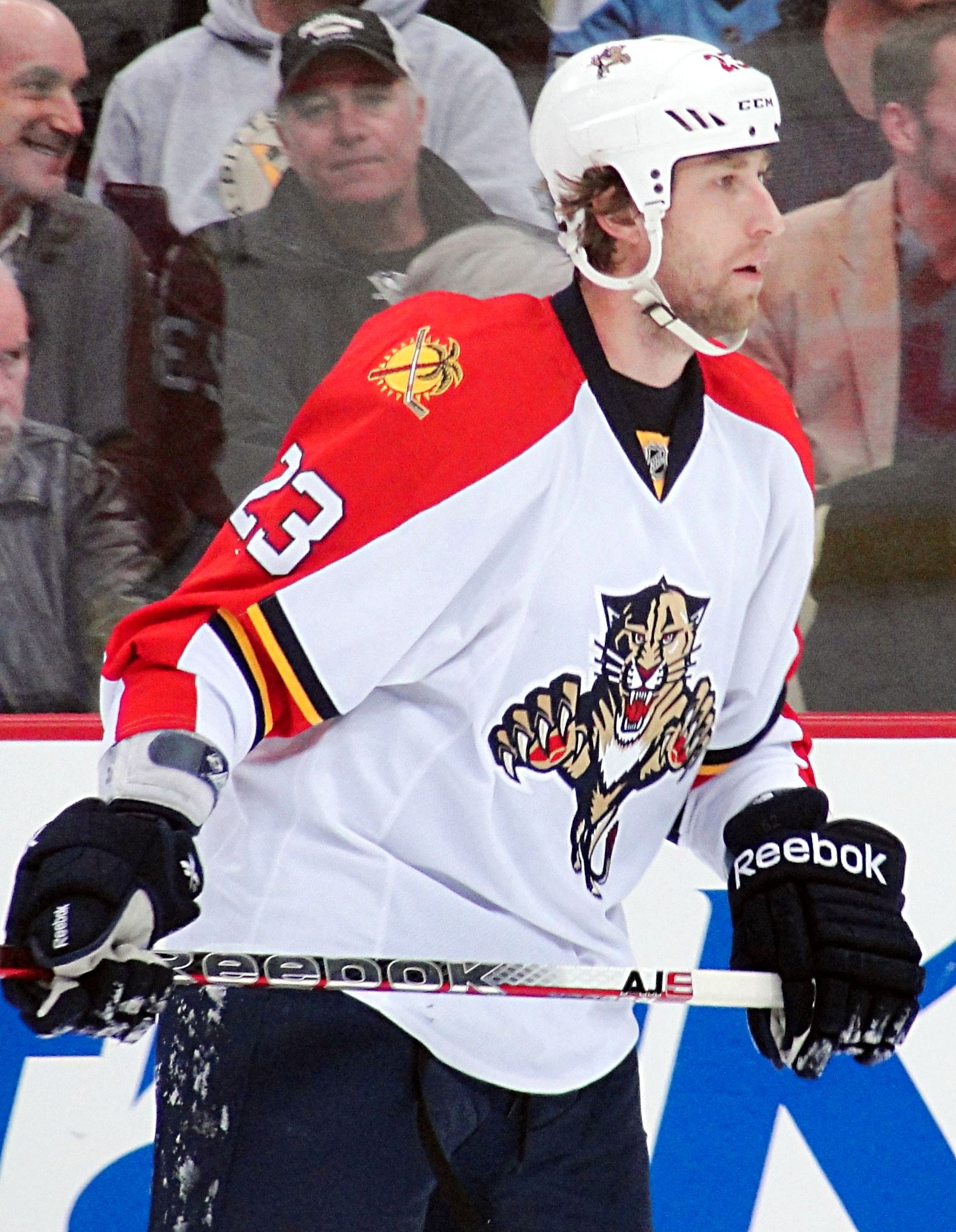
Tyson Strachan

=== WHA ===
One Buckeye played in the WHA.

Player	Position	Team(s)	Years	Avco Cups
Bill Reed	Defenseman	MIC/BAL, CAC	1974–1976	0

== See also ==
- Ohio State Buckeyes women's ice hockey
