= 1972 CCHA men's ice hockey tournament =

1972 CCHA Men's ice hockey tournament
- Dates: March 3–4, 1972
- Teams: 4
- Finals site: St. Louis Arena; St. Louis, Missouri
- Champions: Ohio State (1st title)
- Winning coach: Dave Chambers (1st title)
- MVP: Bill McKenzie (Ohio State)
- CCHA Men's Ice Hockey Tournaments

The 1972 CCHA Men's Ice Hockey Tournament was the first CCHA Men's Ice Hockey Tournament. It was played between March 3 and March 4, 1972, at St. Louis Arena in St. Louis, Missouri. Ohio State won the inaugural tournament, defeating Saint Louis 3–0 in the championship game.

== Conference standings ==
Note: GP = Games played; W = Wins; L = Losses; T = Ties; PTS = Points; GF = Goals For; GA = Goals Against

1971–72 Central Collegiate Hockey Association standings
	Conference							Overall					
	GP	W	L	T	PTS	GF	GA	GP	W	L	T	GF	GA
Ohio State†*	12	8	4	0	16	44	35	29	24	5	0	154	71
Saint Louis	12	7	3	2	16	64	49	33	15	15	3	194	156
Bowling Green	12	6	4	2	14	60	48	33	21	10	2	172	123
Ohio	12	1	11	0	2	34	70	24	7	17	0	97	132
Championship: Ohio State † indicates conference regular season champion * indicates conference tournament champion

== Bracket ==
Semifinals; March 3, 1972
1	Ohio State	7
4	Ohio	1
3	Saint Louis	6*
2	Bowling Green	5

Championship; March 4, 1972
1	Ohio State	3
2	Saint Louis	0
Third place
3	Bowling Green	7*
4	Ohio	6

=== Semifinals ===
==== (1) Ohio State vs. (4) Ohio ====
March 3	Ohio State	7 – 1	Ohio	St. Louis Arena

==== (2) Saint Louis vs. (3) Bowling Green ====
March 3	Saint Louis	6 – 5	OT	Bowling Green	St. Louis Arena

=== Third place ===
==== (3) Bowling Green vs. (4) Ohio ====
March 4	Bowling Green	7 – 6	OT	Ohio	St. Louis Arena

=== Championship ===
==== (1) Ohio State vs. (2) Saint Louis ====
March 4	Ohio State	3 – 0	Saint Louis	St. Louis Arena

== Tournament awards ==
=== All-Tournament Team ===
- F Jerry Welsh (Ohio State)
- F John Nestic (Saint Louis)
- F Mike Bartley (Bowling Green)
- D Jim Witherspoon (Ohio State)
- D Roger Archer (Bowling Green)
- G Bill McKenzie* (Ohio State)

* Most Valuable Player(s)
