= Bill McKenzie (ice hockey) =

Canadian ice hockey player

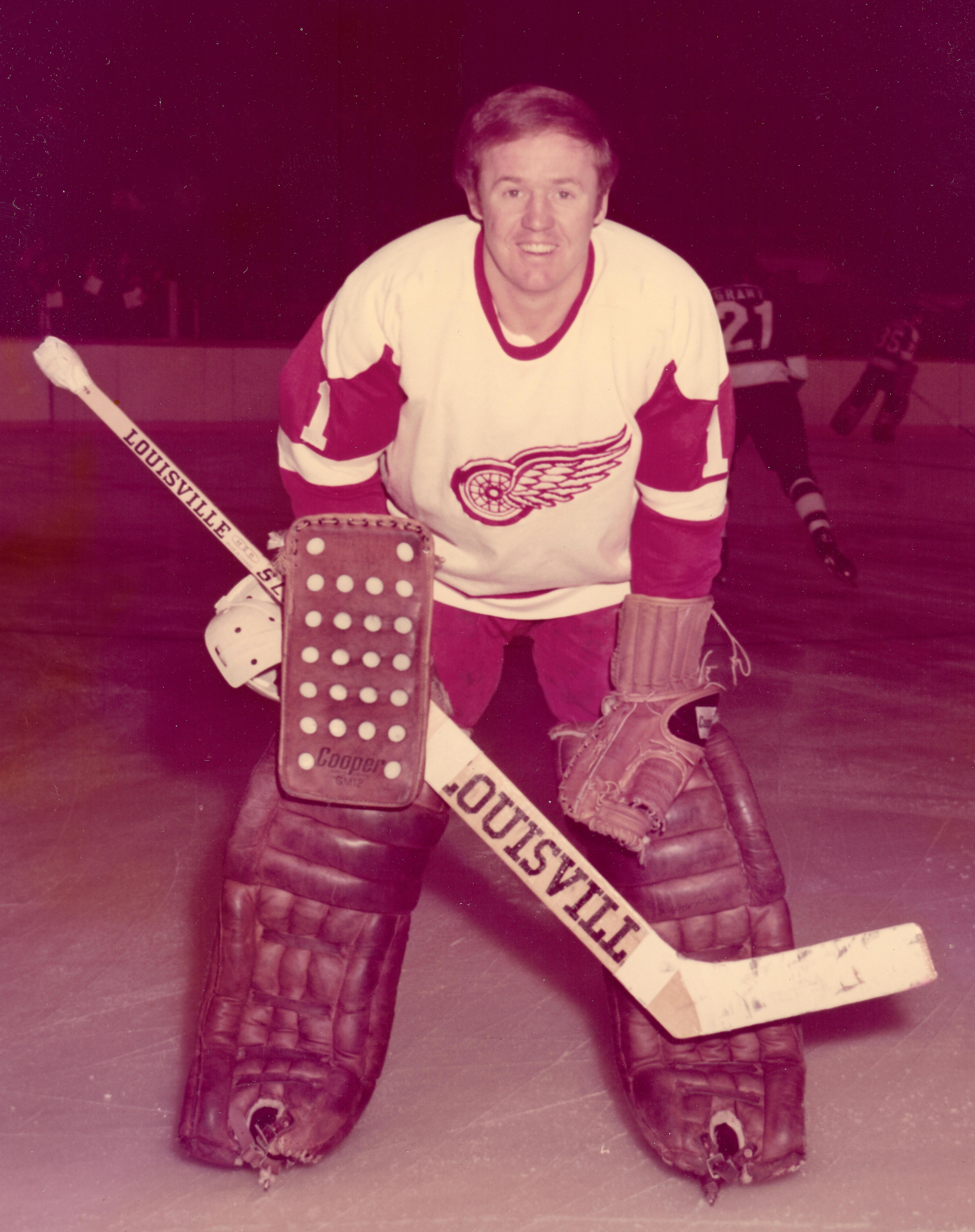
- Born: March 12, 1949 (age 76); St. Thomas, Ontario, Canada
- Height: 5 ft 11 in (180 cm)
- Weight: 180 lb (82 kg; 12 st 12 lb)
- Position: Goaltender
- Caught: Left
- Played for: Detroit Red Wings; Kansas City Scouts; Colorado Rockies
- NHL draft: Undrafted
- Playing career: 1972–1980

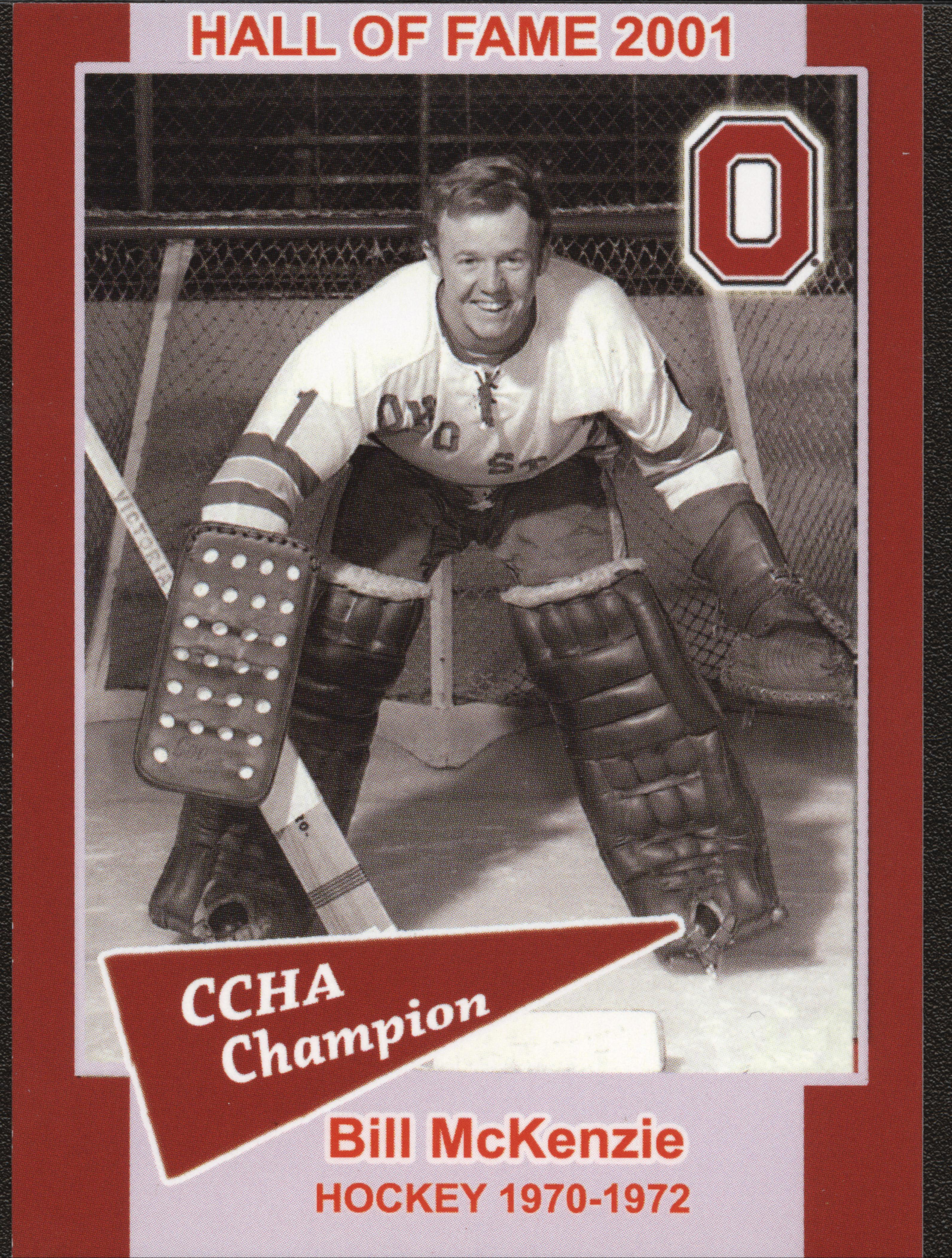

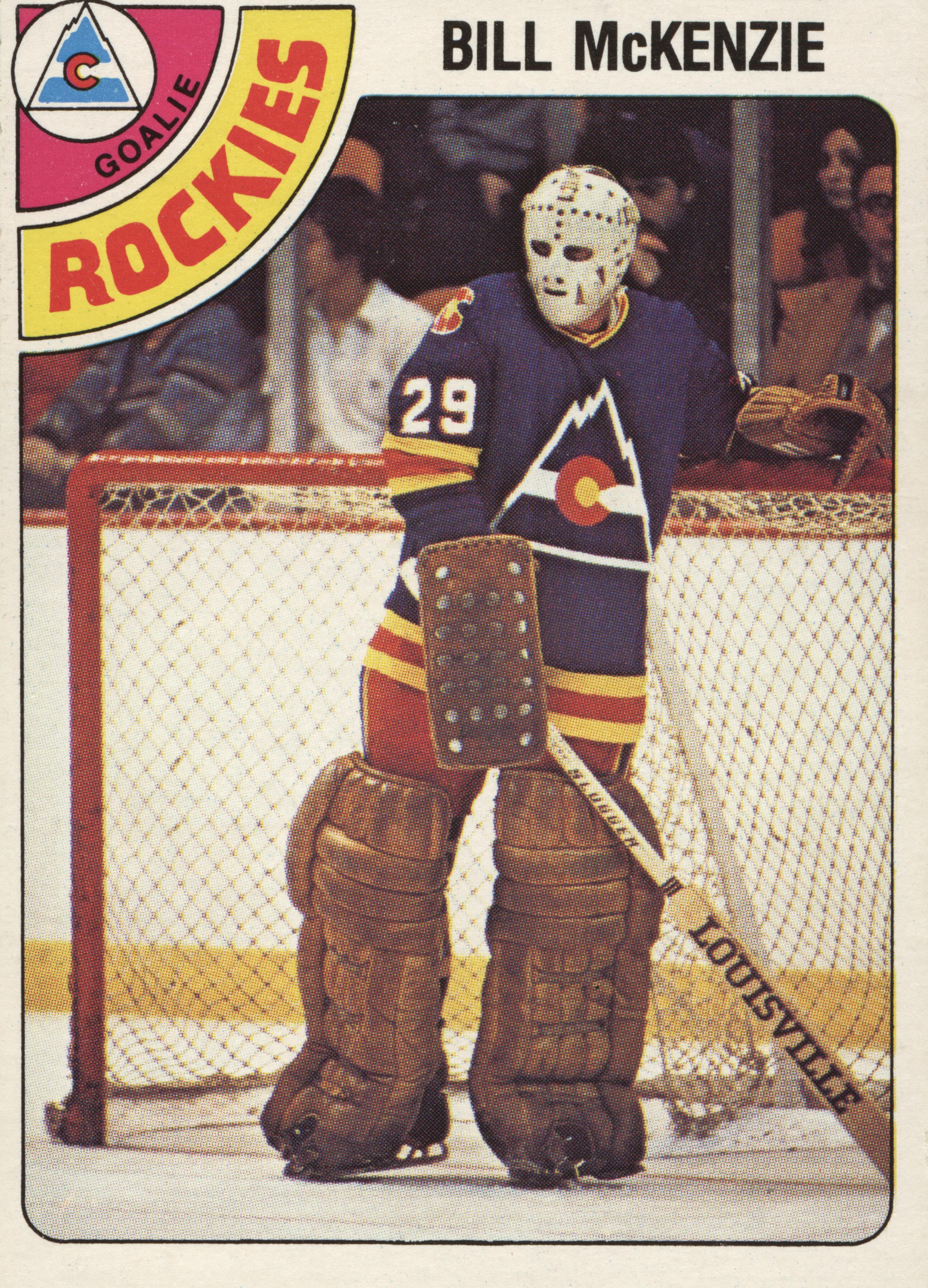

William Ian McKenzie (born March 12, 1949) is a Canadian former professional ice hockey goaltender who played for the Detroit Red Wings, Kansas City Scouts, and Colorado Rockies in the National Hockey League (NHL) between 1973 and 1980. He also played in various minor leagues, primarily the American Hockey League and Central Hockey League.

== Early life ==
McKenzie was born in St. Thomas, Ontario, but his family later moved to Riverside, Ontario. He attended Riverside Secondary School from 1964 to 1968, where he competed in football, track, and hockey.

== Career ==
Before turning professional, McKenzie played for Ohio State University (1968–72), where he helped the team win the inaugural CCHA Tournament Championship in 1972. He was later inducted into the Ohio State University Sports Hall of Fame. Upon retirement from professional hockey, he worked in sales, but continued his involvement with the sport as a volunteer assistant coach for the Ohio State Buckeyes men's ice hockey from 1980 through their first appearance in the NCAA Frozen Four in 1998. He then became a volunteer assistant for the Ohio State Women's hockey team from 2004 to 2010.

== Career statistics ==
=== Regular season and playoffs ===
			Regular season									Playoffs
Season	Team	League	GP	W	L	T	MIN	GA	SO	GAA	SV%	GP	W	L	MIN	GA	SO	GAA	SV%
1969–70	Ohio State University	NCAA	25	—	—	—	1500	79	4	3.16	.907	—	—	—	—	—	—	—	—
1970–71	Ohio State University	NCAA	24	—	—	—	1420	65	2	2.74	—	—	—	—	—	—	—	—	—
1971–72	Ohio State University	CCHA	22	—	—	—	1280	48	4	2.25	.864	—	—	—	—	—	—	—	—
1972–73	Port Huron Wings	IHL	45	—	—	—	2532	120	2	2.84	—	5	3	2	280	6	2	1.29	—
1973–74	Detroit Red Wings	NHL	13	4	4	4	720	43	1	3.59	.885	—	—	—	—	—	—	—	—
1973–74	Virginia Wings	AHL	29	8	13	2	1470	99	1	4.04	.890	—	—	—	—	—	—	—	—
1973–74	London Lions	Exhib	2	—	—	—	120	6	0	3.00	—	—	—	—	—	—	—	—	—
1974–75	Detroit Red Wings	NHL	13	1	9	2	739	58	0	4.71	.862	—	—	—	—	—	—	—	—
1974–75	Virginia Wings	AHL	14	8	6	0	700	33	1	2.82	—	—	—	—	—	—	—	—	—
1975–76	Kansas City Scouts	NHL	22	1	16	1	1119	97	0	5.20	.845	—	—	—	—	—	—	—	—
1976–77	Colorado Rockies	NHL	5	0	2	1	199	8	0	2.41	.921	—	—	—	—	—	—	—	—
1976–77	Oklahoma City Blazers	CHL	6	2	3	1	358	24	0	4.02	—	—	—	—	—	—	—	—	—
1976–77	Kansas City Blues	CHL	10	7	2	1	513	25	0	2.92	—	10	8	2	634	23	2	2.18	—
1977–78	Colorado Rockies	NHL	12	3	6	2	651	42	0	3.87	.879	—	—	—	—	—	—	—	—
1977–78	Hampton Gulls	AHL	12	7	4	0	645	38	1	3.53	—	—	—	—	—	—	—	—	—
1977–78	Philadelphia Firebirds	AHL	5	1	4	0	305	22	1	4.33	—	—	—	—	—	—	—	—	—
1978–79	Tulsa Oilers	CHL	35	6	25	1	1935	164	0	5.09	—	—	—	—	—	—	—	—	—
1979–80	Colorado Rockies	NHL	26	9	12	3	1340	78	1	3.49	.871	—	—	—	—	—	—	—	—
1979–80	Fort Worth Texans	CHL	9	2	5	1	521	29	1	3.34	—	—	—	—	—	—	—	—	—
NHL totals			91	18	49	13	4768	326	2	4.10	.868	—	—	—	—	—	—	—	—

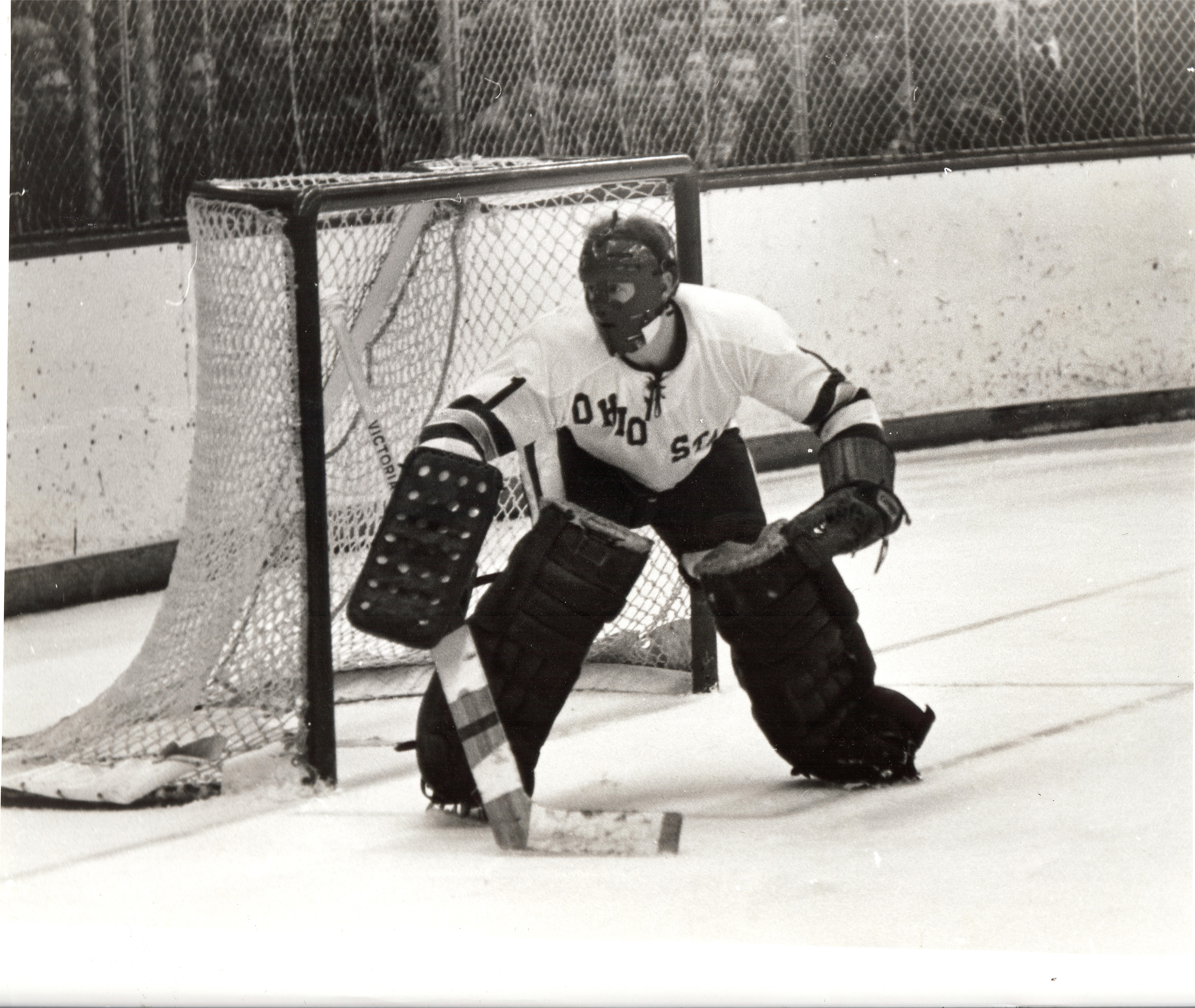

== Awards and honours ==
Award	Year
Ohio State Hockey MVP	1970
CCHA All-Tournament Team	1972
CCHA All-Tournament MVP	1972
IHL Rookie of the Year	1972-3
IHL All-Star	1972-3
CHL Playoff MVP (Max McNabb Trophy)	1977
Ohio State University Sports Hall of Fame	2001
Windsor/Essex County Sports Hall of Fame	2021

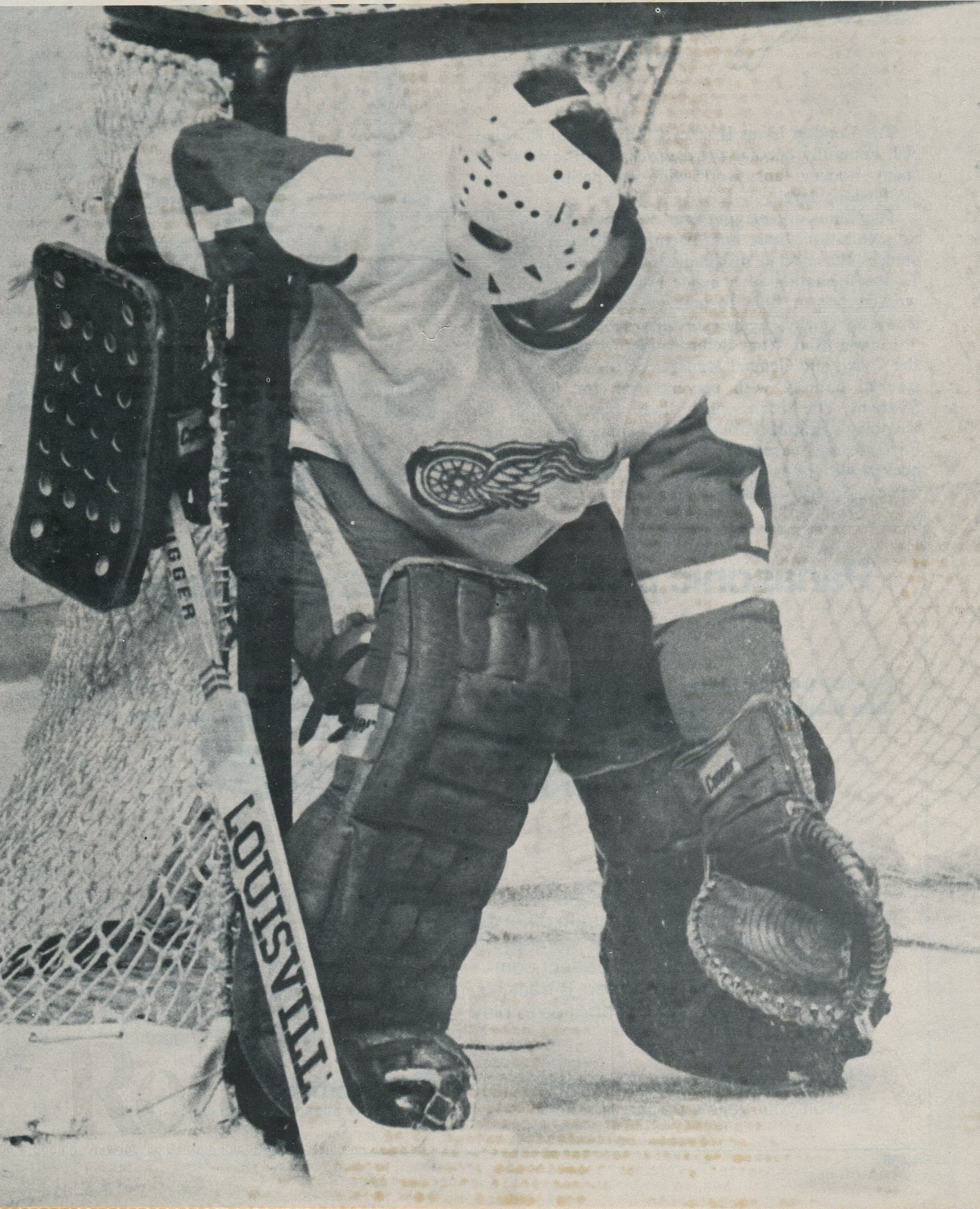

Awards and achievements
Preceded by Award Created	CCHA Most Valuable Player in Tournament; 1972	Succeeded by Ron Scott
