= List of Big Ten men's ice hockey tournament champions =

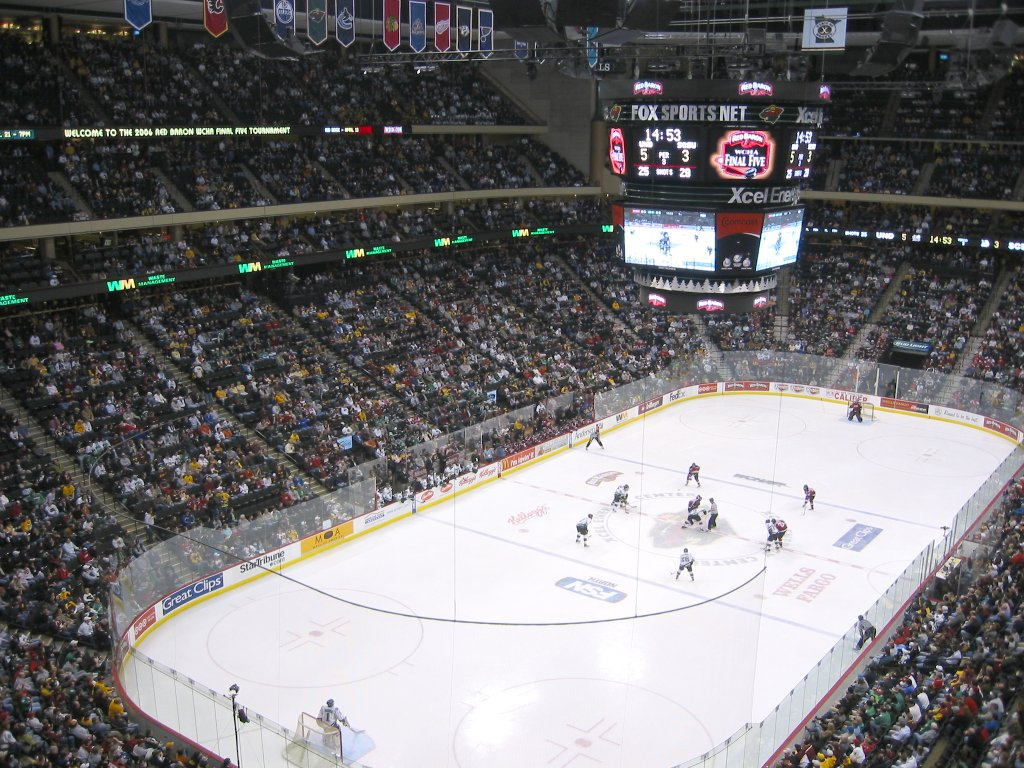
The two host sites of the Big Ten Men's Ice Hockey Tournament for its first four seasons: the Xcel Energy Center in Saint Paul, Minnesota (above) and Joe Louis Arena in Detroit, Michigan (below).

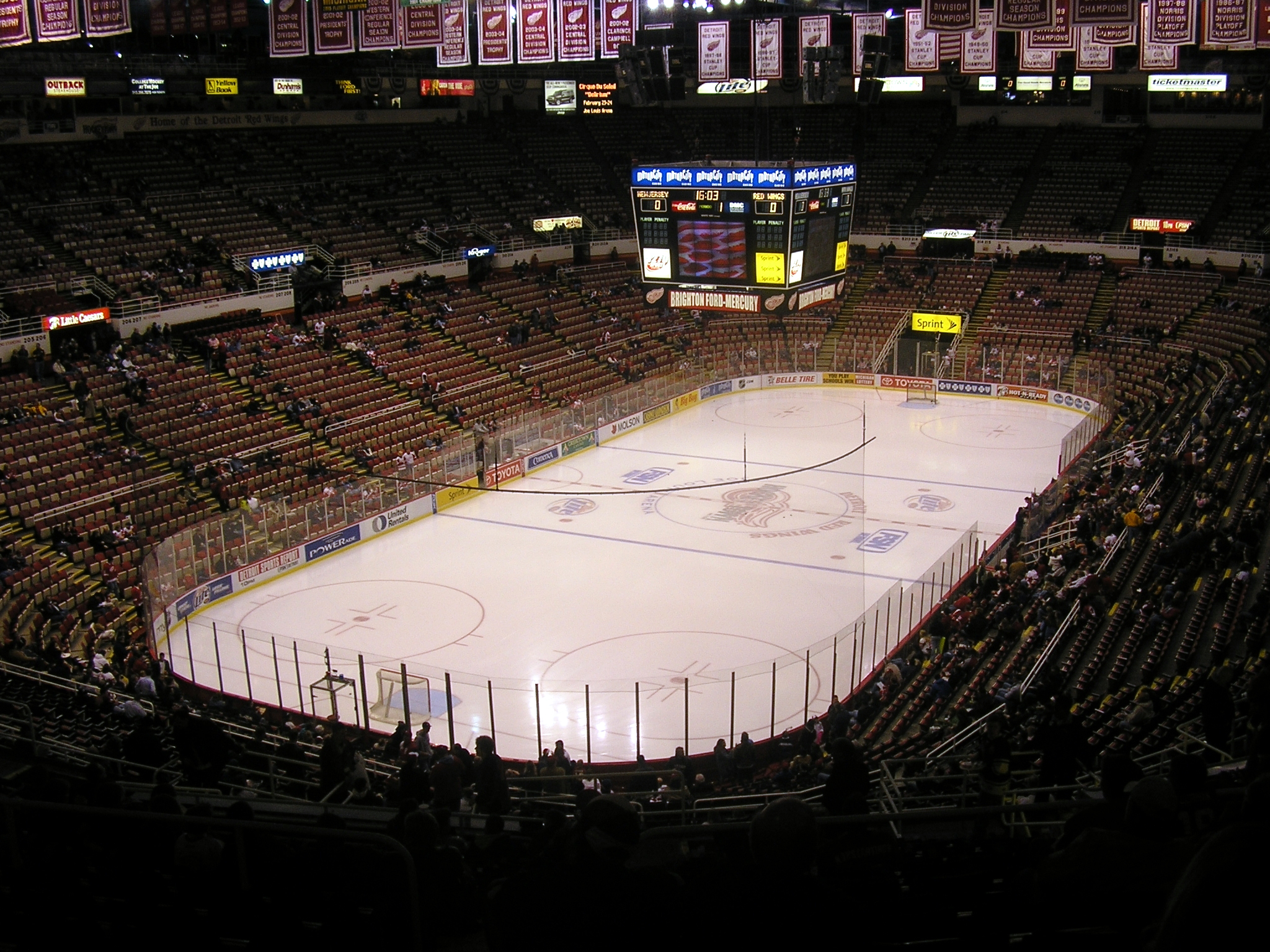

The Big Ten Conference is a National Collegiate Athletic Association (NCAA) Division I conference that has sponsored men's ice hockey since the 2013–14 season. At the completion of each regular season, it holds the Big Ten Men's Ice Hockey Tournament to determine its conference champion. The single-elimination tournament includes all seven Big Ten teams: Michigan, Michigan State, Minnesota, Notre Dame, Ohio State, Penn State, and Wisconsin.

The original tournament format was contested over three days at one host site. This arrangement lasted for the first four tournaments, with the sites split between the Xcel Energy Center in Saint Paul, Minnesota (2014 and 2016) and Joe Louis Arena in Detroit, Michigan (2015 and 2017). Starting with the 2018 tournament, the games have been hosted on campus sites.

== Champions ==
Year	Winning team	Coach	Losing team	Coach	Score	Location	Venue	Ref
2014	Wisconsin	Mike Eaves	Ohio State	Steve Rohlik	5–4 ^{(OT)}	Saint Paul, Minnesota	Xcel Energy Center	
2015	Minnesota	Don Lucia	Michigan	Red Berenson	4–2	Detroit, Michigan	Joe Louis Arena	
2016	Michigan	Red Berenson	Minnesota	Don Lucia	5–3	Saint Paul, Minnesota	Xcel Energy Center	
2017	Penn State	Guy Gadowsky	Wisconsin	Tony Granato	2–1 ^{(2OT)}	Detroit, Michigan	Joe Louis Arena	
2018	Notre Dame	Jeff Jackson	Ohio State	Steve Rohlik	3–2 ^{(OT)}	Notre Dame, Indiana	Compton Family Ice Arena	
2019	Notre Dame	Jeff Jackson	Penn State	Guy Gadowsky	3–2	Notre Dame, Indiana	Compton Family Ice Arena	
2020	Cancelled due to the COVID-19 pandemic							
2021	Minnesota	Bob Motzko	Wisconsin	Tony Granato	6–4	Notre Dame, Indiana	Compton Family Ice Arena	
2022	Michigan	Mel Pearson	Minnesota	Bob Motzko	4–3	Minneapolis, Minnesota	3M Arena at Mariucci	
2023	Michigan	Brandon Naurato	Minnesota	Bob Motzko	4–3	Minneapolis, Minnesota	3M Arena at Mariucci	
2024	Michigan State	Adam Nightingale	Michigan	Brandon Naurato	5–4 ^{(OT)}	East Lansing, Michigan	Munn Ice Arena	
2025	Michigan State	Adam Nightingale	Ohio State	Steve Rohlik	4–3 ^{(2OT)}	East Lansing, Michigan	Munn Ice Arena	
2026	Michigan	Brandon Naurato	Ohio State	Steve Rohlik	7–3	Ann Arbor, Michigan	Yost Ice Arena	
