= List of Penn State Nittany Lions men's ice hockey seasons =

This is a list of seasons completed by the Penn State Nittany Lions men's ice hockey team. The list documents the season-by-season records of the Nittany Lions from 1940 to present, including conference and national post season records.

== Season-by-season results ==
=== Varsity Sport ===
NCAA D-I Champions	NCAA Frozen Four	Conference regular season champions	Conference Playoff Champions

Season	Conference	Regular season (Note: Code explanation; GP—Games Played, W—Wins, L—Losses, T—Tied games, OTW—Overtime Wins, OTL—Overtime Loses, 3/SW—Win in 3 on 3 overtime or shootout, Pts—Points*)														Conference Tournament Results	National Tournament Results
Season	Conference	Conference									Overall					Conference Tournament Results	National Tournament Results
Season	Conference	GP	W	L	T	OTW	OTL	3/SW	Pts*	Finish	GP	W	L	T	%	Conference Tournament Results	National Tournament Results
No Coach (1909–1910)
1909–10	Intercollegiate League	2	0	2	0	-	-	-	.000	3rd	2	0	2	0	.000		
Program Suspended
Arthur Davis (1940–1944)
1940–41	Independent	-	-	-	-	-	-	-	-	-	10	6	3	1	.650		
1941–42	Independent	-	-	-	-	-	-	-	-	-	8	5	3	0	.625		
1942–43	Independent	-	-	-	-	-	-	-	-	-	4	2	2	0	.500		
1943–44	Independent	-	-	-	-	-	-	-	-	-	2	0	2	0	.000		
Program Suspended
James O'Hora (1946–1947)
1946–47	Independent	-	-	-	-	-	-	-	-	-	3	0	3	0	.000		
Program Suspended
Guy Gadowsky (2012–Present)
2012–13	Independent	-	-	-	-	-	-	-	-	-	27	13	14	0	.481		
2013–14	Big Ten	20	3	16	1	-	-	0	10	6th	36	8	26	2	.250	Won Quarterfinal, 2–1 (2OT) (Michigan); Lost Semifinal, 1–2 (Wisconsin)	
2014–15	Big Ten	20	10	9	1	-	-	0	31	4th	37	18	15	4	.541	Lost Quarterfinal, 3–1 (Ohio State)	
2015–16	Big Ten	20	10	9	1	-	-	1	32	3rd	38	21	13	4	.605	Won Quarterfinal, 5–2 (Wisconsin); Lost Semifinal, 2–7 (Michigan)	
2016–17	Big Ten	24	10	9	1	-	-	0	31	4th	39	25	12	2	.667	Won Quarterfinal, 4–1 (Michigan); Won Semifinal, 4–3 (OT) (Minnesota); Won championship, 2–1 (2OT) (Wisconsin)	Won Regional Semifinal, 10–3 (Union); Lost Regional Final, 3–6 (Denver)
2017–18	Big Ten	24	9	10	5	-	-	2	34	4th	38	18	15	5	.539	Won Quarterfinal series, 2–0 (Minnesota); Lost Semifinal, 2–3 (Notre Dame)	Lost Regional Semifinal, 1–5 (Denver)
2018–19	Big Ten	24	11	12	1	-	-	1	35	4th	39	22	15	2	.590	Won Quarterfinal series, 2–1 (Wisconsin); Won Semifinal, 5–1 (Ohio State); Lost Championship, 2–3 (Notre Dame)	
2019–20	Big Ten	24	12	8	4	-	-	1	41	1st	34	20	10	4	.647	Tournament cancelled	
2020–21	Big Ten	18	7	11	0	2	1	0	.389	5th	22	10	12	0	.455	Won Quarterfinal, 6–3 (Notre Dame); Lost Semifinal, 3–4 (OT) (Wisconsin)	
2021–22	Big Ten	24	6	17	1	1	1	1	20	T–5th	38	17	20	1	.461	Won Quarterfinal series, 2–1 (Ohio State); Lost Semifinal, 2–3 (Minnesota)	
2022–23	Big Ten	24	10	13	1	0	3	0	34	T–5th	39	22	16	1	.577	Lost Quarterfinal series, 1–2 (Ohio State)	Won Regional Semifinal, 8–0 (Michigan Tech); Lost Regional Final, 1–2 (OT) (Michigan)
2023–24	Big Ten	24	7	14	3	0	1	2	27	6th	36	15	18	3	.458	Lost Quarterfinal series, 0–2 (Michigan)	
2024–25	Big Ten	24	9	11	4	2	1	3	33	5th	40	22	14	4	.600	Won Quarterfinal series, 2–0 (Minnesota); Lost Semifinal, 3–4 (OT) (Ohio State)	Won Regional Semifinal, 5–1 (Maine); Won Regional Final, 3–2 (OT) (Connecticut); Lost National Semifinal, 1–3 (Boston University)
Totals											GP	W	L	T	%	Championships	
Regular season											454	224	197	33	.530	1 Big Ten Championship	
Conference Post-season											30	16	14	0	.533	1 Big Ten tournament championship	
NCAA Post-season											8	4	4	0	.500	4 NCAA Tournament appearances, 1 Frozen Four	
Regular season and Post-season Record											492	244	215	33	.529		

* Winning percentage is used when conference schedules are unbalanced.

=== Club Sport ===
National champions	National semifinalist	Conference regular season champions	Conference Playoff Champions

Season	Conference	Regular season												Conference Tournament Results	National Tournament Results
Season	Conference	Conference							Overall					Conference Tournament Results	National Tournament Results
Season	Conference	GP	W	L	T	3/SW	Pts*	Finish	GP	W	L	T	%	Conference Tournament Results	National Tournament Results
Larry Hendry (1971–1972)
1971–72	Independent	-	-	-	-	-	-	-	19	13	6	0	.684		
Jim Hodgson, Joe MacNeil, Fred Lampe (1972–1973)
1972–73	Independent	-	-	-	-	-	-	-	21	10	11	0	.476		
Jim Hodgson (1973–1974)
1973–74	Independent	-	-	-	-	-	-	-	24	8	15	1	.354		
Morris Kurtz (1974–1976)
1974–75	Independent	-	-	-	-	-	-	-	15	11	3	1	.767		
1975–76	Independent	-	-	-	-	-	-	-	16	13	3	0	.813		
Bob Hettema (1976–1977)
1976–77	MACHC	-	-	-	-	-	-	1st	21	14	6	1	.690		
Clayton John (1977–1979)
1977–78	MACHC	-	-	-	-	-	-	1st	26	15	8	3	.635		
1978–79	MACHC	-	-	-	-	-	-	1st	19	15	2	2	.889	Won championship	
Mark Horgas (1979–1980
1979–80	MACHC	-	-	-	-	-	-	1st	23	18	5	0	.783	Won championship	
Clayton John (1980–1981)
1980–81	-	-	-	-	-	-	-	1st	30	24	6	0	.800	Won championship	
John Shellington (1981–1987)
1981–82	Independent	-	-	-	-	-	-	-	32	24	8	0	.750		Club National 3rd-Place
1982–83	Independent	-	-	-	-	-	-	-	29	16	12	1	.569		Club National Runner Up
1983–84	Independent	-	-	-	-	-	-	-	40	24	15	1	.613		Won Club National Championship
1984–85	ICHL	-	-	-	-	-	-	-	33	20	11	2	.636		Club National Runner Up
1985–86	ICHL	-	-	-	-	-	-	-	36	17	16	3	.514		Club National 4th-Place
1986–87	ICHL	-	-	-	-	-	-	-	34	24	9	1	.721		Club National 5th-Place
Joe Battista (1987–2006)
1987–88	ICHL	-	-	-	-	-	-	-	36	23	11	2	.667		Club National 4th-Place
1988–89	ICHL	18	10	7	1	-	21	1st	32	18	13	1	.578	Won championship	
1989–90	ICHL	18	10	5	3	-	23	1st	34	23	8	3	.721		Won Club National Championship
1990–91	ICHL	16	11	3	2	-	24	1st	35	26	6	3	.786		Club National 3rd-Place
1991–92	ICHL	16	14	1	1	-	29	1st	33	25	7	1	.773		
1992–93	ACHL	8	8	0	0	-	16	1st	34	33	1	0	.971	Won championship	ACHA National runner-up
1993–94	ACHL	7	7	0	0	-	14	1st	33	24	8	1	.742	Won championship	ACHA National 5th-Place
1994–95	Independent	-	-	-	-	-	-	-	34	27	6	1	.809		ACHA National runner-up
1995–96	Independent	-	-	-	-	-	-	-	31	26	4	1	.855		ACHA National 3rd-Place
1996–97	Independent	-	-	-	-	-	-	-	36	27	9	0	.750		ACHA National 3rd-Place
1997–98	Independent	-	-	-	-	-	-	-	37	31	5	1	.851		Won ACHA national championship
1998–99	Independent	-	-	-	-	-	-	-	33	26	4	3	.833		ACHA National runner-up
1999–00	Independent	-	-	-	-	-	-	-	34	26	7	1	.779		Won ACHA national championship
2000–01	Independent	-	-	-	-	-	-	-	34	28	4	2	.853		Won ACHA national championship
2001–02	Independent	-	-	-	-	-	-	-	33	28	4	1	.864		Won ACHA national championship
2002–03	Independent	-	-	-	-	-	-	-	34	30	3	1	.897		Won ACHA national championship
2003–04	Independent	-	-	-	-	-	-	-	33	24	8	1	.742		ACHA National runner-up
2004–05	Independent	-	-	-	-	-	-	-	34	27	6	1	.809		ACHA National runner-up
2005–06	Independent	-	-	-	-	-	-	-	39	27	10	2	.718		ACHA National runner-up
Scott Balboni (2006–2011)
2006–07	Independent	-	-	-	-	-	-	-	39	31	6	2	.821		ACHA National runner-up
2007–08	ESCHL	20	18	2	0	-	36	1st	40	32	4	4	.850	Won championship, 8–3 (Delaware)	
2008–09	ESCHL	18	13	5	0	-	26	1st	41	32	8	1	.793	Won championship, 4–1 (Delaware)	ACHA National 4th-Place
2009–10	ESCHL	20	17	3	0	-	34	1st	38	32	5	1	.855	Won championship, 4–1 (Rhode Island)	ACHA National 5th-Place
2010–11	ESCHL	16	10	6	0	-	34	3rd	35	23	11	1	.671		ACHA National 11th-Place
Guy Gadowsky (2011–2012)
2011–12	Independent	-	-	-	-	-	-	-	34	29	4	1	.868		ACHA National 4th-Place
Totals									GP	W	L	T	%	Championships	
Regular season and Post-season Record									1294	944	298	52	.750	2 Club National Championships, 5 ACHA national championships	
