= Big Ten men's ice hockey tournament =

American college ice hockey tournament

- Conference hockey championship
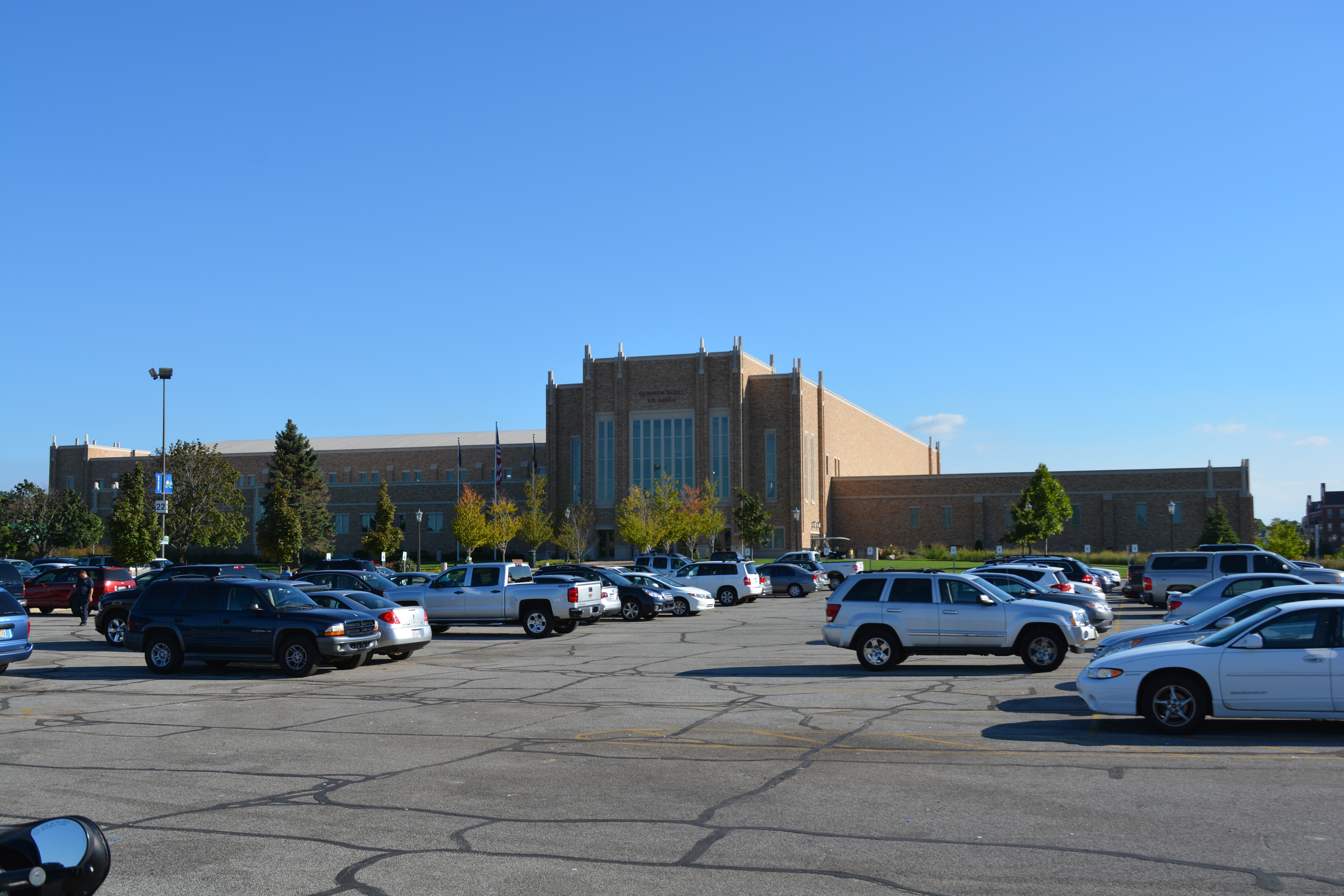
- Notre Dame's Compton Family Ice Arena has hosted the championship game three times, the most of any venue.
- Sport: Ice hockey
- Conference: Big Ten Conference
- Number of teams: 7
- Format: Single-elimination tournament
- Last contest: 2026
- Current champion: Michigan (4th title)
- Most championships: Michigan (4)
- TV partner: Big Ten Network
- Official website: www.bigten.org

The Big Ten men's ice hockey tournament is the conference tournament for the Big Ten Conference. The winner of the tournament receives an automatic berth into the NCAA Tournament.

The tournament was first held in 2014, the first year of conference play; the first four tournaments alternated between Xcel Energy Center in Saint Paul, Minnesota and Joe Louis Arena in Detroit, Michigan. Due to the addition of Notre Dame to conference play, a new playoff format was introduced for the 2018 tournament, utilizing campus sites instead.

== Format ==
=== 2014–2017 ===
From 2014 through 2017, all six Big Ten teams participated in a single-elimination tournament held over three days at one neutral host site. These four tournaments alternated between Xcel Energy Center in Saint Paul, Minnesota and Joe Louis Arena in Detroit, Michigan.

Teams were seeded by the regular-season conference standings. In the quarterfinals on Thursday of the tournament weekend, No. 3 played No. 6 and No. 4 played No. 5. On Friday, No. 2 played the winner of the first game and No. 1 played the winner of the second game (the teams were not reseeded). The two semifinal winners played each other on Saturday in the final.

=== 2018–present ===
Due to poor attendance at the neutral site tournaments, and the addition of Notre Dame as a seventh Big Ten team in hockey, a new format was introduced in 2018. The No. 1 team in the regular-season conference standings automatically advances to the conference semifinals, while the remaining teams are seeded into best-of-three quarterfinals to determine the three remaining teams. The remainder of the playoff is single-elimination.

All games are held at the home arena of the team with the higher seed, rather than a neutral site. In order to reduce the likelihood of scheduling conflicts at team venues, the semifinals and championship are played as single games (in contrast to other conference tournaments). The 2020 tournament was cancelled due to the COVID-19 pandemic.

== Members ==
There are currently seven member schools, with all seven participating in the men's division.

Institution	City	Nickname	Founded	Affiliation	Enrollment
University of Michigan	Ann Arbor, Michigan	Wolverines	1817	Public	44,718
Michigan State University	East Lansing, Michigan	Spartans	1855	Public	55,543
University of Minnesota	Minneapolis, Minnesota	Golden Gophers	1851	Public	48,231
University of Notre Dame	South Bend, Indiana	Fighting Irish	1842	Private	12,292
Ohio State University	Columbus, Ohio	Buckeyes	1870	Public	59,873
Pennsylvania State University	State College, Pennsylvania	Nittany Lions	1855	Public	46,606
University of Wisconsin	Madison, Wisconsin	Badgers	1848	Public	43,820

== Big Ten Men's Ice Hockey Tournament champions ==
Year	Winning team	Coach	Losing team	Coach	Score	Location	Venue	Reference
2014	Wisconsin	Mike Eaves	Ohio State	Steve Rohlik	5–4 ^{(OT)}	Saint Paul, Minnesota	Xcel Energy Center	
2015	Minnesota	Don Lucia	Michigan	Red Berenson	4–2	Detroit, Michigan	Joe Louis Arena	
2016	Michigan	Red Berenson	Minnesota	Don Lucia	5–3	Saint Paul, Minnesota	Xcel Energy Center	
2017	Penn State	Guy Gadowsky	Wisconsin	Tony Granato	2–1 ^{(2OT)}	Detroit, Michigan	Joe Louis Arena	
2018	Notre Dame	Jeff Jackson	Ohio State	Steve Rohlik	3–2 ^{(OT)}	Notre Dame, Indiana	Compton Family Ice Arena	
2019	Notre Dame	Jeff Jackson	Penn State	Guy Gadowsky	3–2	Notre Dame, Indiana	Compton Family Ice Arena	
2020	Cancelled due to the COVID-19 pandemic							
2021	Minnesota	Bob Motzko	Wisconsin	Tony Granato	6–4	Notre Dame, Indiana	Compton Family Ice Arena	
2022	Michigan	Mel Pearson	Minnesota	Bob Motzko	4–3	Minneapolis, Minnesota	3M Arena at Mariucci	
2023	Michigan	Brandon Naurato	Minnesota	Bob Motzko	4–3	Minneapolis, Minnesota	3M Arena at Mariucci	
2024	Michigan State	Adam Nightingale	Michigan	Brandon Naurato	5–4 ^{(OT)}	East Lansing, Michigan	Munn Ice Arena	
2025	Michigan State	Adam Nightingale	Ohio State	Steve Rohlik	4–3 ^{(2OT)}	East Lansing, Michigan	Munn Ice Arena	
2026	Michigan	Brandon Naurato	Ohio State	Steve Rohlik	7–3	Ann Arbor, Michigan	Yost Ice Arena	

== Championship records ==
=== By school ===
No.	School	Record	Pct
1	Michigan	4–2	.667
2	Notre Dame	2–0	1.000
3	Michigan State	2–0	1.000
4	Minnesota	2–3	.400
5	Penn State	1–1	.500
6	Wisconsin	1–2	.333
7	Ohio State	0–4	.000

=== By coach ===
No.	Coach	Record	Pct
T1	Jeff Jackson	2–0	1.000
T1	Adam Nightingale	2–0	1.000
2	Brandon Naurato	2–1	.667
T3	Mike Eaves	1–0	1.000
T3	Mel Pearson	1–0	1.000
T4	Red Berenson	1–1	.500
T4	Guy Gadowski	1–1	.500
T4	Don Lucia	1–1	.500
5	Bob Motzko	1–2	.333
6	Tony Granato	0–2	.000
7	Steve Rohlik	0–4	.000

== Performance by team ==
The code in each cell represents the furthest the team made it in the respective tournament:

- – Team not in Big Ten
- QF Quarterfinals (4 teams from 2014 to 2017, 6 teams afterwards)
- SF Semifinals
- F Finals
- CH Champion

Note: the 2020 tournament was cancelled prior to the start of the semifinal round.

School	#	QF	SF	F	CH	14	15	16	17	18	19	20	21	22	23	24	25	26
Michigan	13	12	9	6	4	QF	F	CH	QF	SF	QF	SF	SF	CH	CH	F	QF	CH
Minnesota	13	7	10	5	2	SF	CH	F	SF	QF	SF	SF	CH	F	F	SF	QF	QF
Michigan State	13	9	5	2	2	QF	SF	QF	QF	QF	QF	QF	QF	QF	SF	CH	CH	SF
Notre Dame	9	8	4	2	2	–	–	–	–	CH	CH	QF	QF	SF	QF	QF	SF	QF
Wisconsin	13	10	3	3	1	CH	QF	QF	F	QF	QF	QF	F	QF	QF	QF	QF	QF
Penn State	13	12	10	2	1	SF	QF	SF	CH	SF	F	SF	SF	SF	QF	QF	SF	SF
Ohio State	13	12	11	4	0	F	SF	SF	SF	F	SF	SF	QF	QF	SF	SF	F	F
