= Red Berenson =

Canadian ice hockey player, coach (born 1939)

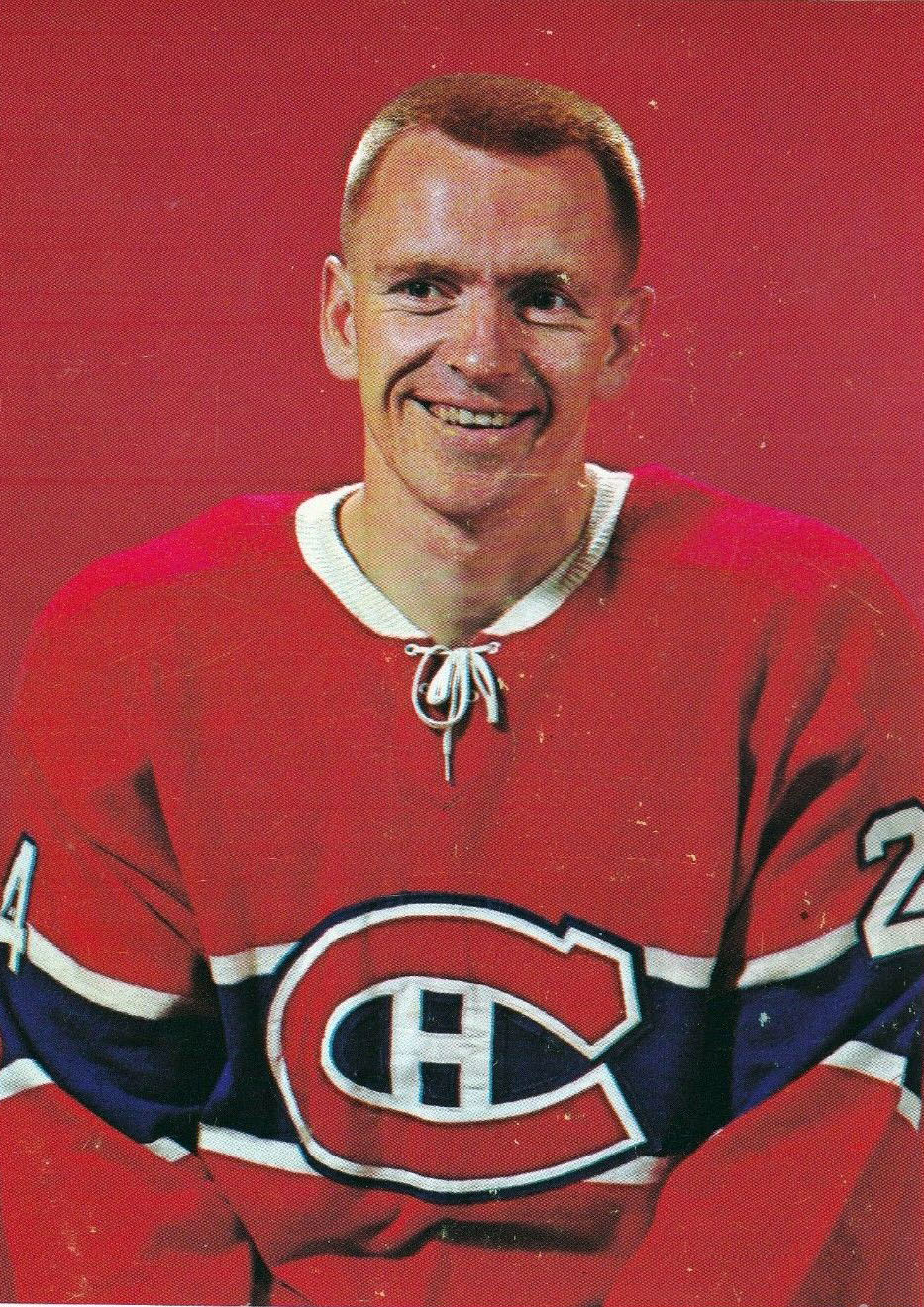
- Berenson with the Montreal Canadiens in the 1960s
- Born: December 8, 1939 (age 86) Regina, Saskatchewan, Canada
- Height: 6 ft 0 in (183 cm)
- Weight: 195 lb (88 kg; 13 st 13 lb)
- Position: Centre
- Shot: Left
- Played for: Montreal Canadiens; New York Rangers; St. Louis Blues; Detroit Red Wings
- National team: Canada
- Playing career: 1961–1978
Medal record
Representing Canada
Ice hockey
World Championships
Gold medal – first place	1959 Prague
- Coaching career
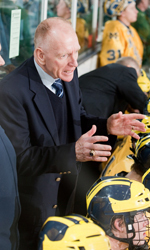
- Berenson coaching the Michigan Wolverines

Biographical details
- Education: University of Michigan

Playing career
- 1959–1962: Michigan
- Position: Left Wing

Coaching career (HC unless noted)
- 1978–1979: St. Louis Blues (assistant)
- 1979–1982: St. Louis Blues
- 1982–1984: Buffalo Sabres (assistant)
- 1984–2017: Michigan

Head coaching record
- Overall: 848–426–92 (.654) [College] 100–72–32 (.569) [NHL]
- Tournaments: 30–23 (.566)

Accomplishments and honors

Championships
- 2x NCAA national champion (1996, 1998); 11x NCAA Frozen Four Appearances (1992, 1993, 1995-1998, 2001-2003, 2008, 2011); Smythe Division Champion (1981); 11x CCHA regular season champion (1992, 1994-1997, 2000, 2002, 2004, 2005, 2008, 2011); 9x CCHA tournament champion (1994, 1996, 1997, 1999, 2002, 2003, 2005, 2008, 2010); Big Ten tournament champion (2016); 15x Great Lakes Invitational Champion (1988-1996, 2007, 2008, 2010, 2011, 2014, 2015)

Awards
- Jack Adams Award (1981); 2x CCHA Coach of the Year (1994, 2008); Spencer Penrose Award (2008); Big Ten Coach of the Year (2016); Hobey Baker Legends of College Hockey Award (2018); University of Michigan Athletic Hall of Honor (1983); Michigan Sports Hall of Fame (1996); St. Louis Sports Hall of Fame (2013); St. Louis Blues Hall of Fame (2023); Saskatchewan Hockey Hall of Fame (2013)

Records
- Most Wins by a Michigan Hockey Coach (848) Most Consecutive NCAA Tournament Appearances by any Team in NCAA History (22 Consecutive from 1991-2012)

Gordon Arthur "Red" Berenson (born December 8, 1939) is a Canadian former professional ice hockey centre, world champion, Stanley Cup champion and head coach of the Michigan Wolverines men's ice hockey team from 1984 to 2017. Berenson was inducted into Canada's Sports Hall of Fame in 2005 and the United States Hockey Hall of Fame in 2018.

== Playing career ==
Berenson played junior ice hockey with the Regina Pats, participating in two Memorial Cups in 1956 and 1958. In 1959, Berenson played for the world champion Belleville McFarlands.

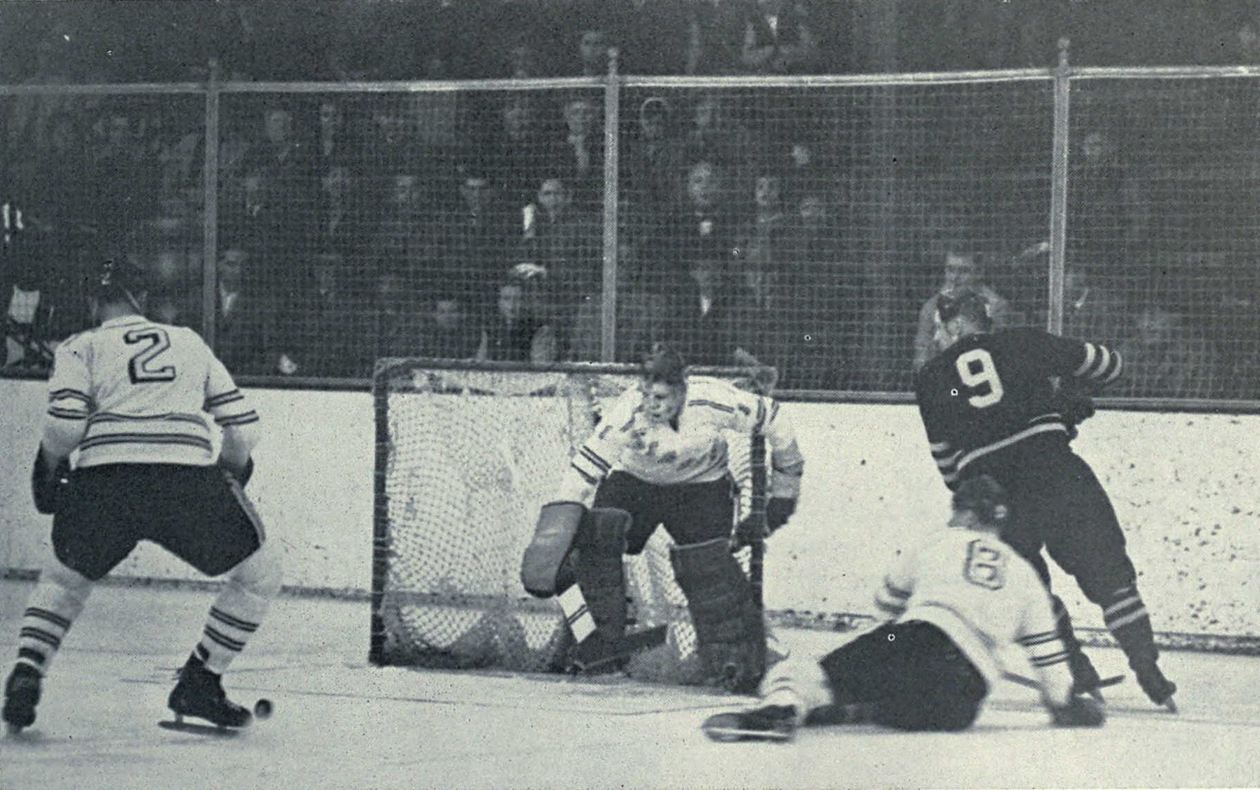
Berenson (No. 9) cuts behind the net against Colorado College 1961

Berenson moved on to, and graduated from, Michigan's School of Business and played collegiately at the University of Michigan, winning All-American honors there with an NCAA-leading 43 goals in his final year.

Berenson signed thereafter with the Montreal Canadiens, playing five years in their system and being on a Stanley Cup-winning squad in 1965 before being traded to the New York Rangers, where he played parts of two seasons without success.

Seven weeks into the 1967/1968 NHL season, the St. Louis Blues acquired Berenson and Barclay Plager from the New York Rangers. It was with the Blues where Berenson became one of the new Western Division's first great stars, leading the Blues to three straight Stanley Cup finals and being named the division's best player by his peers in The Sporting News' annual poll each of those years.

Berenson's most notable scoring feat came on November 7, 1968, in a road game against the Philadelphia Flyers. Berenson scored six goals, including four over nine minutes. He became the first player to score a double hat trick on a road game. The six-goal total was one shy of the all-time NHL record (set by Joe Malone in 1920), and has been accomplished only once since.

Berenson was named team captain in 1970; however, as he was already 31 years old, the Blues felt his skills were in decline, and traded him in what was considered a shocking deal to the Detroit Red Wings, a multi-player trade receiving centre Garry Unger in return. He was an impact player for Detroit for four seasons but was having a poor fifth season when he was dealt back to the Blues. The trade rejuvenated him, and he was an effective player for three and a half seasons back in St. Louis before he retired after the 1977–1978 campaign.

Berenson played in the legendary eight-game Summit Series for Team Canada against the Soviet Union in 1972, as well as in the “old-timers” rematch of the Canada Cup in 1987. He played in six NHL All-Star Games.

Altogether, in 17 NHL seasons, Berenson recorded 261 goals and 397 assists in 987 games.

== Coaching career ==
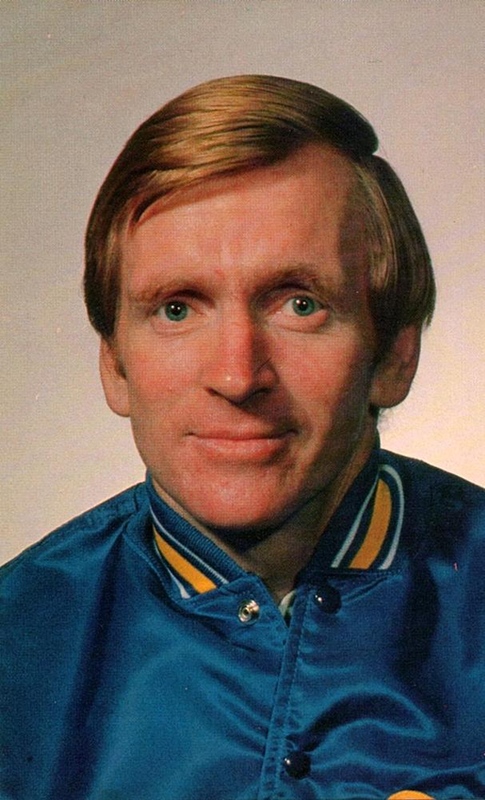
Berenson in 1978 postcard for St. Louis Blues

Berenson retired from playing in 1978 and joined the Blues' coaching staff. He became the team's head coach midway through the 1979–80 season. A year later, he won the Jack Adams Award as the NHL's Coach of the Year.

Berenson returned to his alma mater as head coach in 1984 and remained in the position for 33 seasons. He led the Wolverines to 11 Frozen Four appearances, and NCAA championships in 1996 and 1998. In CCHA competition, his teams have won 11 regular-season and 9 tournament titles. In addition, Berenson's squads qualified for the NCAA tournament for 22 consecutive seasons from 1991 to 2012. This is the longest streak ever in college hockey history. The Wolverines have also won 15 Great Lakes Invitational titles under Berenson.

On January 10, 2015, Berenson became the fourth coach in Division I men's hockey history to reach 800 career wins. Berenson was named the 2015–16 Big Ten Coach of the Year after leading the Wolverines to a 22–7–5 regular-season record, including a 12–5–3–2 record in Big Ten play.

On April 10, 2017, Berenson announced his retirement as head coach of the Michigan Wolverine men's ice hockey team after 33 years. He finished his career with an 848–426–92 record in 1,366 games and helped lead Michigan to a record 36 NCAA tournament appearances.

== Awards and honors ==
Award	Year
All-WCHA First Team	1960–61, 1961–62
AHCA West All-American	1960–61, 1961–62
All-NCAA All-Tournament First Team	1962
Big Ten Coach of the Year	2015–16
NHL All-Star Game	1965, 1969, 1970, 1971, 1972, 1974

== Career statistics ==
=== Regular season and playoffs ===
			Regular season					Playoffs
Season	Team	League	GP	G	A	Pts	PIM	GP	G	A	Pts	PIM
1955–56	Regina Pats	SJHL	—	—	—	—	—	—	—	—	—	—
1955–56	Regina Pats	MC	—	—	—	—	—	5	0	0	0	0
1956–57	Regina Pats	SJHL	51	21	23	44	86	7	3	4	7	4
1957–58	Regina Pats	SJHL	51	46	49	95	62	27	11	20	31	49
1957–58	Regina Pats	MC	—	—	—	—	—	5	0	0	0	0
1958–59	Belleville McFarlands	EOHL	1	2	1	3	2	—	—	—	—	—
1958–59	Flin Flon Bombers	WCJHL	—	—	—	—	—	10	10	9	19	10
1958–59	Flin Flon Bombers	MC	—	—	—	—	—	6	3	3	6	2
1959–60	Michigan Wolverines	WCHA	28	12	7	19	12	—	—	—	—	—
1960–61	Michigan Wolverines	WCHA	28	24	25	49	—	—	—	—	—	—
1961–62	Michigan Wolverines	WCHA	28	43	27	70	40	—	—	—	—	—
1961–62	Montreal Canadiens	NHL	4	1	2	3	4	5	2	0	2	4
1962–63	Hull-Ottawa Canadiens	EPHL	30	23	25	48	28	—	—	—	—	—
1962–63	Montreal Canadiens	NHL	37	2	6	8	15	5	0	0	0	0
1963–64	Montreal Canadiens	NHL	69	7	9	16	12	7	0	0	0	4
1964–65	Quebec Aces	AHL	65	22	34	56	16	5	1	2	3	8
1964–65	Montreal Canadiens	NHL	3	1	2	3	0	9	0	1	1	2
1965–66	Quebec Aces	AHL	34	17	36	53	14	6	1	5	6	2
1965–66	Montreal Canadiens	NHL	23	3	4	7	12	—	—	—	—	—
1966–67	New York Rangers	NHL	30	0	5	5	2	4	0	1	1	2
1967–68	New York Rangers	NHL	19	2	1	3	2	—	—	—	—	—
1967–68	St. Louis Blues	NHL	55	22	29	51	22	18	5	2	7	9
1968–69	St. Louis Blues	NHL	76	35	47	82	43	12	7	3	10	20
1969–70	St. Louis Blues	NHL	67	33	39	72	38	16	7	5	12	8
1970–71	St. Louis Blues	NHL	45	16	26	42	12	—	—	—	—	—
1970–71	Detroit Red Wings	NHL	24	5	12	17	4	—	—	—	—	—
1971–72	Detroit Red Wings	NHL	78	28	41	69	16	—	—	—	—	—
1972–73	Detroit Red Wings	NHL	78	13	30	43	8	—	—	—	—	—
1973–74	Detroit Red Wings	NHL	76	24	42	66	28	—	—	—	—	—
1974–75	Detroit Red Wings	NHL	27	3	3	6	8	—	—	—	—	—
1974–75	St. Louis Blues	NHL	44	12	19	31	12	2	1	0	1	0
1975–76	St. Louis Blues	NHL	72	20	27	47	47	3	1	2	3	0
1976–77	St. Louis Blues	NHL	80	21	28	49	8	4	0	0	0	4
1977–78	St. Louis Blues	NHL	80	13	25	38	12	—	—	—	—	—
NHL totals			987	261	397	658	305	85	23	14	37	49

=== International ===
Year	Team	Event	GP	G	A	Pts	PIM
1959	Canada	WC	8	9	4	13	—
1972	Canada	SS	2	0	1	1	0
Senior totals			10	9	5	14	—

== Head coaching record ==
=== NHL ===
Team	Year	Regular season						Postseason			
Team	Year	G	W	L	T	Pts	Finish	W	L	Win %	Result
STL	1979–80	56	27	20	9	63	2nd in Smythe	0	3	.000	Lost in Preliminary round (CHI)
STL	1980–81	80	45	18	17	107	1st in Smythe	5	6	.455	Lost in Quarterfinals (NYR)
STL	1981–82	68	28	34	6	62	(fired)	—	—	—	—
Total		204	100	72	32			5	9	.357	2 playoff appearances

=== College ===
Record table
Season	Team	Overall	Conference	Standing	Postseason
Michigan Wolverines (CCHA) (1984–2013)
1984–85	Michigan	13–26–1	11–20–1	t-7th	CCHA first round
1985–86	Michigan	12–26–0	10–22–0	8th	CCHA first round
1986–87	Michigan	14–25–1	11–20–1	7th	CCHA first round
1987–88	Michigan	22–19–0	17–15–0	5th	CCHA first round
1988–89	Michigan	22–15–4	17–11–4	4th	CCHA first round
1989–90	Michigan	24–12–6	16–11–5	4th	CCHA consolation game (win)
1990–91	Michigan	34–10–3	24–5–3	2nd	NCAA Quarterfinals
1991–92	Michigan	32–9–3	22–7–3	1st	NCAA Frozen Four
1992–93	Michigan	30–7–3	23–5–2	2nd	NCAA Frozen Four
1993–94	Michigan	33–7–1	24–5–1	1st	NCAA West Regional semifinals
1994–95	Michigan	30–8–1	22–4–1	1st	NCAA Frozen Four
1995–96	Michigan	34–7–2	22–6–2	t-1st	NCAA National Champion
1996–97	Michigan	35–4–4	21–3–3	1st	NCAA Frozen Four
1997–98	Michigan	34–11–1	22–7–1	2nd	NCAA National Champion
1998–99	Michigan	25–11–6	17–8–5	2nd	NCAA East Regional semifinals
1999–00	Michigan	27–10–4	19–6–3	1st	NCAA East Regional semifinals
2000–01	Michigan	27–13–5	16–9–3	t-2nd	NCAA Frozen Four
2001–02	Michigan	28–11–5	19–5–4	1st	NCAA Frozen Four
2002–03	Michigan	30–10–3	18–7–3	2nd	NCAA Frozen Four
2003–04	Michigan	27–14–2	18–8–2	1st	NCAA Northeast Regional Finals
2004–05	Michigan	31–8–3	21–3–2	1st	NCAA Midwest Regional Finals
2005–06	Michigan	21–15–5	13–10–5	3rd	NCAA West Regional semifinals
2006–07	Michigan	26–14–1	18–9–1	2nd	NCAA West Regional semifinals
2007–08	Michigan	33–6–4	24–4–4	1st	NCAA Frozen Four
2008–09	Michigan	29–12–0	20–8–0–0	2nd	NCAA East Regional semifinals
2009–10	Michigan	26–18–1	14–13–1–0	t-7th	NCAA Midwest Regional Finals
2010–11	Michigan	29–11–4	20–7–1–0	1st	NCAA runner-up
2011–12	Michigan	24–13–4	15–9–4–1	t-2nd	NCAA Midwest Regional semifinals
2012–13	Michigan	18–19–3	10–15–3–3	7th	CCHA runner-up
Michigan:		770–371–80	524–262–68		
Michigan Wolverines (Big Ten) (2013–2017)
2013–14	Michigan	18–13–4	10–8–2–1	3rd	Big Ten Quarterfinals
2014–15	Michigan	22–15–0	12–8–0	3rd	Big Ten Runner-Up
2015–16	Michigan	25–8–5	12–5–3–2	2nd	NCAA Midwest Regional Finals
2016–17	Michigan	13–19–3	6–12–2–2	5th	Big Ten Quarterfinals
Michigan:		78–55–12	40–33–6		
Total:		848–426–92			
National champion Postseason invitational champion Conference regular season champion Conference regular season and conference tournament champion Division regular season champion Division regular season and conference tournament champion Conference tournament champion

== See also ==
- List of college men's ice hockey coaches with 400 wins
- List of players with 5 or more goals in an NHL game
- University of Michigan Athletic Hall of Honor

Awards and achievements
Preceded by Jerry Walker	WCHA Most Valuable Player; 1961–62	Succeeded by Louis Nanne
Preceded by Pat Quinn	Winner of the Jack Adams Award; 1981	Succeeded by Tom Watt
Preceded by George Gwozdecky; Jeff Jackson	CCHA Coach of the Year; 1993–94; 2007–08	Succeeded by Buddy Powers; Dallas Ferguson
Preceded by Jeff Jackson	Spencer Penrose Award; 2007–08	Succeeded by Jack Parker
Preceded by Guy Gadowsky	Big Ten Coach of the Year; 2015–16	Succeeded by Tony Granato
Preceded by Bill Riley Jr.	Hobey Baker Legends of College Hockey Award; 2018	Succeeded by Jim Cross
Sporting positions
Preceded by Al Arbour; Barclay Plager; Garry Unger	St. Louis Blues captain 1970–71; 1976; 1977–78	Succeeded by Al Arbour; Garry Unger; Barry Gibbs
Preceded by Nick Libett	Detroit Red Wings captain 1973	Succeeded by Gary Bergman
Preceded by Barclay Plager	Head coach of the St. Louis Blues; 1979–82	Succeeded by Emile Francis
