= Steve Rohlik =

American ice hockey player (born 1968)

- Born: May 15, 1968 (age 58) Saint Paul, Minnesota, USA
- Height: 5 ft 11 in (180 cm)
- Weight: 184 lb (83 kg; 13 st 2 lb)
- Position: Left wing
- Shot: Right
- NHL draft: 151st overall, 1986; Pittsburgh Penguins
- Playing career: 1986–1992
- Coaching career

Current position
- Title: Head coach
- Team: Ohio State
- Conference: Big Ten

Biographical details
- Education: University of Wisconsin–Madison

Playing career
- 1986–1990: Wisconsin
- 1991–1992: Knoxville Cherokees
- Position: Left Wing

Coaching career (HC unless noted)
- 1990–1991: Wisconsin (Assistant)
- 1991–1992: Stillwater Area High School (Assistant)
- 1992–1997: Hill-Murray School
- 1997–2000: Nebraska–Omaha (Assistant)
- 2000–2010: Minnesota–Duluth (Assistant)
- 2010–2013: Ohio State (Associate)
- 2013–present: Ohio State

Head coaching record
- Overall: 221–177–45 (.550)
- Tournaments: 2–4 (.333)

Accomplishments and honors

Championships
- Big Ten regular season champions (2019)

Awards
- As a player: WCHA Tournament MVP (1990); As a coach: 3× Big Ten Coach of the Year (2018, 2019, 2025)

Steve Rohlik (/ˈrɒlɪk/) is an American ice hockey head coach and former player. In April 2013 he became head coach in charge of the men's program at Ohio State.

== Career ==
Rohlik got his start at the college level as a player for Wisconsin in the late '80's. He spent four years playing for the Badgers, spending two campaigns as team captain and winning a national title in his senior season. After graduating with a degree in Communications/Journalism Rohlik became an assistant for his alma mater for a year before pursuing an abbreviated professional career with the Knoxville Cherokees. During that year he also served as an assistant with Stillwater Area High School but left to become the head coach for the Hill-Murray School, a secondary school near his home town.

In 1997 Rohlik left Minnesota and returned to the college ranks as an assistant for the new program at Nebraska–Omaha under Mike Kemp. Rohlik remained with the Mavericks for three seasons before he accepted a similar position with Minnesota–Duluth with their new bench boss, Scott Sandelin. Rohlik worked for the Bulldogs for a decade, leaving the year before the program won its first national title, to become an associate coach with Ohio State beneath his former college teammate Mark Osiecki. For three years the Buckeyes struggled to achieve the .500 mark and in 2013 Osiecki was let go. Nine days after his future with the program became uncertain Rohlik was hired as the head coach.

When Rohlik took over he did so just in time for the Buckeyes to start competing in the Big Ten. In his first year Rohlik got the Buckeyes to record their first winning season in five years and finished as the runner-up in the inaugural conference tournament. Over the next two years the Buckeyes had losing records but Rohlik managed to get his team to win a conference tournament game in each year. In his fourth season the Buckeyes finally got back into the NCAA tournament, posting a 21-win season in the process. He is signed to be the head coach at Ohio State through the 2025–26 season.

== Career statistics ==
			Regular season					Playoffs
Season	Team	League	GP	G	A	Pts	PIM	GP	G	A	Pts	PIM
1986–87	Wisconsin Badgers	WCHA	31	3	0	3	34	—	—	—	—	—
1987–88	Wisconsin Badgers	WCHA	44	3	10	13	59	—	—	—	—	—
1988–89	Wisconsin Badgers	WCHA	44	11	14	25	44	—	—	—	—	—
1989–90	Wisconsin Badgers	WCHA	46	16	23	40	52	—	—	—	—	—
1991–92	Knoxville Cherokees	ECHL	6	1	3	4	4	—	—	—	—	—
NCAA totals			165	33	47	80	189	—	—	—	—	—

== Head coaching record ==
=== College ===
Record table
Season	Team	Overall	Conference	Standing	Postseason
Ohio State Buckeyes (Big Ten) (2013–present)
2013–14	Ohio State	18–14–5	6–9–5–4	4th	Big Ten Runner-Up
2014–15	Ohio State	14–19–3	8–11–1–0	5th	Big Ten Semifinals
2015–16	Ohio State	14–18–4	8–8–4–1	4th	Big Ten Semifinals
2016–17	Ohio State	21–12–6	11–8–1–1	3rd	NCAA Regional Semifinals
2017–18	Ohio State	26–10–5	14–8–2–1	2nd	NCAA Frozen Four
2018–19	Ohio State	20–11–5	13–7–4–3	1st	NCAA Regional Semifinals
2019–20	Ohio State	20–11–5	11–9–4–1	T–2nd	Tournament Cancelled
2020–21	Ohio State	7–19–1	6–16–0	6th	Big Ten Quarterfinals
2021–22	Ohio State	22–13–2	13–9–1	4th	Big Ten Quarterfinals
2022–23	Ohio State	21–16–3	11–11–2	3rd	NCAA Regional Final
2023–24	Ohio State	14–20–4	4–18–2	7th	Big Ten Semifinals
2024–25	Ohio State	24–14–2	14–9–1	3rd	NCAA Regional Semifinals
Ohio State:		221–177–45 (.550)	108–114–23 (.488)		
Total:		221–177–45 (.550)			
National champion Postseason invitational champion Conference regular season champion Conference regular season and conference tournament champion Division regular season champion Division regular season and conference tournament champion Conference tournament champion

Awards and achievements
Preceded by Bill Pye	WCHA Most Outstanding Player in Tournament; 1990	Succeeded by Bill Pye
Preceded by Tony Granato; Adam Nightingale	Big Ten Coach of the Year; 2017–18, 2018–19; 2024–25	Succeeded by Bob Motzko; Adam Nightingale
