= Big Ten Men's Ice Hockey Coach of the Year =

Big Ten Coach of the Year
- Sport: Ice hockey
- Awarded for: The Coach of the Year in the Big Ten

History
- First award: 2014
- Most recent: Adam Nightingale

The Big Ten Coach of the Year is an annual award given out at the conclusion of the Big Ten regular season to the best coach in the conference as voted by a media panel and the head coaches of each team.

The Player of the Year was first awarded in 2014 and is a successor to the CCHA Coach of the Year which was discontinued after the conference dissolved due to the 2013–14 NCAA conference realignment.

== Award winners ==
Year	Winner	School
2013–14	Don Lucia	Minnesota
2014–15	Guy Gadowsky	Penn State
2015–16	Red Berenson	Michigan
2016–17	Tony Granato	Wisconsin
2017–18	Steve Rohlik	Ohio State
2018–19	Steve Rohlik	Ohio State
2019–20	Bob Motzko	Minnesota
2020–21	Tony Granato	Wisconsin
2021–22	Bob Motzko	Minnesota
2022–23	Bob Motzko	Minnesota
2023–24	Adam Nightingale	Michigan State
2024–25	Steve Rohlik	Ohio State
2025–26	Adam Nightingale	Michigan State

=== Winners by school ===
School	Winners
Minnesota	4
Ohio State	3
Michigan State	2
Wisconsin	2
Michigan	1
Penn State	1
