= Adam Nightingale =

American ice hockey player and coach (born 1979)

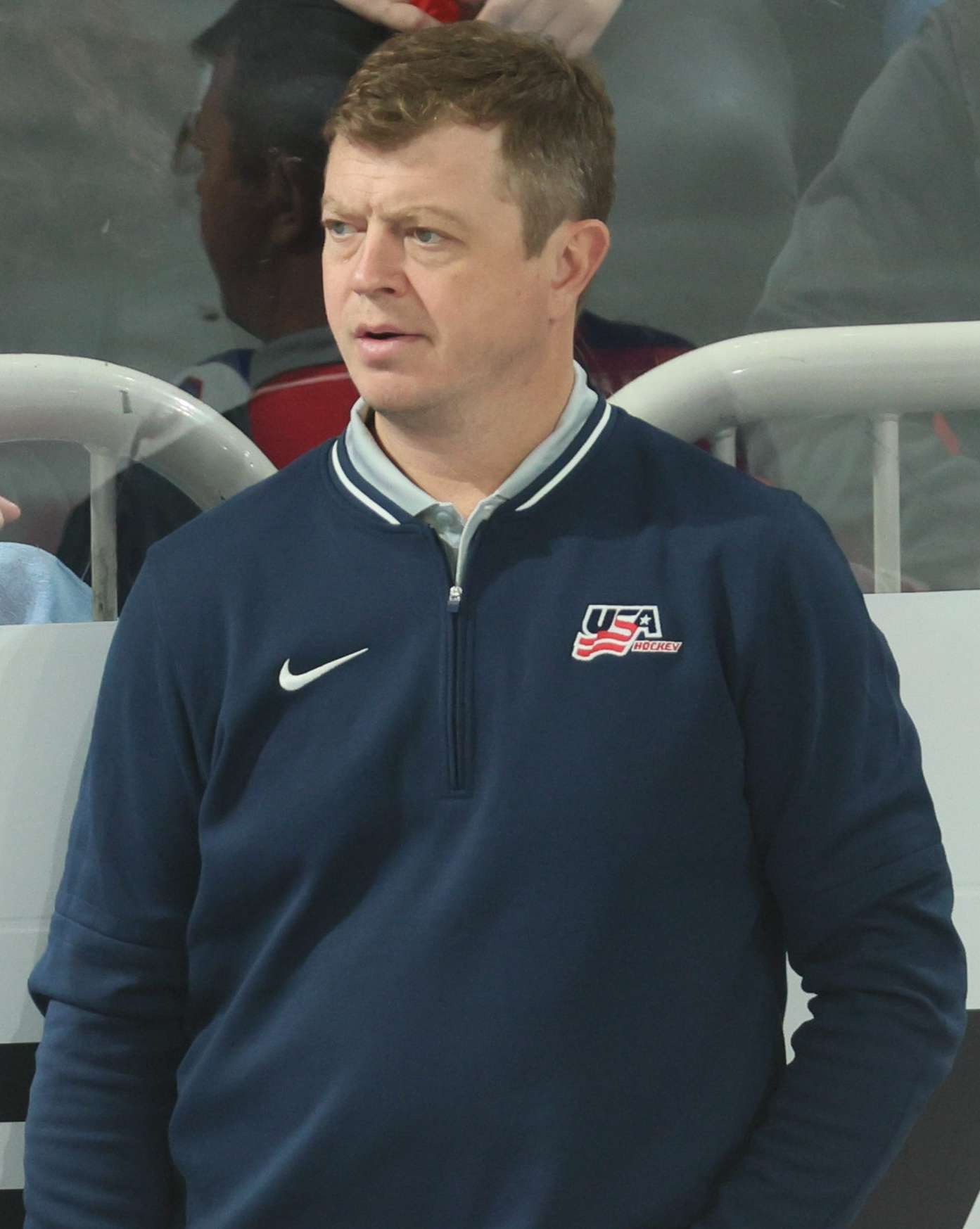
- Nightingale in 2025

Current position
- Title: Head coach
- Team: Michigan State
- Conference: Big Ten
- Record: 94–43–11 (.672)

Biographical details
- Born: December 19, 1979 (age 46); Cheboygan, Michigan
- Education: Michigan State University

Playing career
- 2000–2002: Lake Superior State
- 2003–2005: Michigan State
- 2004–2006: Greenville Grrrowl
- 2006–2008: Charlotte Checkers
- Position: Right wing

Coaching career (HC unless noted)
- 2022–present: Michigan State

Head coaching record
- Overall: 93–41–9 (.672)
- Tournaments: 1–2 (.333)

Accomplishments and honors

Awards
- 2× Big Ten Coach of the Year (2024, 2026)

Adam Nightingale (born December 19, 1979) is an American former ice hockey player and the head coach of the Michigan State Spartans men's ice hockey team.

== Playing career ==
Nightingale began his collegiate career at Lake Superior State where he recorded six goals and nine assists in 51 games in two seasons. He sat out the 2002–03 season after transferring to Michigan State. He was a two-year assistant captain for the Spartans and recorded 12 goals and 10 assists in 67 games. Following his collegiate career, on March 23, 2005, he signed a contract with the Greenville Grrrowl of the ECHL. He went on to play two seasons for the Grrrowl and two seasons for the Charlotte Checkers where he recorded 10 goals, 17 assists and 171 penalty minutes in 78 games from 2004 to 2008.

== Coaching career ==
Following his playing career, Nightingale was named head coach of the Shattuck-Saint Mary's AA team in 2008, a position he held for two seasons.

On July 15, 2010, he was named the Director of Hockey Operations for Michigan State. He served as the Director of Hockey Operations for the Spartans for four years before being named the head coach at Shattuck-Saint Mary's under-14 AAA team from 2014 to 2016. He won a national title with the team in 2016.

On July 15, 2016, he was named a video coach for the Buffalo Sabres during the 2016–17 season. On May 3, 2017, he was named video coach for the Detroit Red Wings during the 2017–18 season. In August 2019, he was promoted to assistant coach for the 2019–20 season.

On August 27, 2020, he was named the head coach for the USA Hockey National Team Development Program under-17 team.

On May 3, 2022, he was named the head coach for Michigan State. During the 2022–23 season, in his first season with the Spartans, he led the team to an 18–18–2 record and the semifinals of the 2023 Big Ten tournament. On March 4, 2023, in the second game of the quarterfinals, Michigan State won their first Big Ten tournament game. This was their first win in 15 all-time games in the tournament for the Spartans. Michigan State won the series, and advanced to the semifinals for the first time in program history.

During the 2023–24 season, he led the Spartans to a 25–10–3 record, and the program's first Big Ten Conference regular season championship and Big Ten Tournament championship in program history. On March 7, 2024, he signed a five-year contract extension with Michigan State. On November 9, 2024, Nightingale earned his 50th win as the head coach of the Spartans, making him the fastest to reach 50 victories in program history, doing so in just 85 games.

During the 2024–25 season, he led the Spartans to a 26–7–4 record, and the Big Ten Conference regular season championship and Big Ten Tournament championship for the second consecutive year. On June 13, 2025, he signed a rollover contract extension with Michigan State.

=== International ===
Nightingale served as the video coordinator for the United States at the 2015 World Junior Ice Hockey Championships and the 2017, 2018 and 2019 IIHF World Championship.

On May 10, 2021, he was named an assistant coach for the United States men's national ice hockey team at the 2021 IIHF World Championship and won a bronze medal.

On April 6, 2022, he was named the head coach for the United States men's national under-18 ice hockey team at the 2022 IIHF World U18 Championships and won a silver medal.

== Head coaching record ==
Record table
Season	Team	Overall	Conference	Standing	Postseason
Michigan State Spartans (Big Ten) (2022–present)
2022–23	Michigan State	18–18–2	10–12–2	T–5th	Big Ten Semifinals
2023–24	Michigan State	25–10–3	16–6–2	1st	NCAA Regional Final
2024–25	Michigan State	26–7–4	15–5–4	T–1st	NCAA Regional Semifinals
2025–26	Michigan State	25–8–2	16–6–2	1st	
Michigan State:		94–43–11	57–29–10		
Total:		94–43–11 (.672)			
National champion Postseason invitational champion Conference regular season champion Conference regular season and conference tournament champion Division regular season champion Division regular season and conference tournament champion Conference tournament champion

== Personal life ==
Nightingale's younger brother, Jared, is a former professional ice hockey player. They both played college ice hockey together at Michigan State. His older brother, Jason, is assistant director of Amateur Scouting for the Buffalo Sabres.

Awards and achievements
Preceded by Bob Motzko; Steve Rohlik	Big Ten Coach of the Year; 2023–24; 2025–26	Succeeded by Steve Rohlik; Incumbent
