= Don Lucia =

American ice hockey coach

- Born: August 20, 1958 (age 68) Grand Rapids, Minnesota, U.S.
- Height: 6 ft 0 in (183 cm)
- Weight: 185 lb (84 kg; 13 st 3 lb)
- Position: Defenseman
- Played for: Notre Dame
- NHL draft: 168th overall, 1978; Philadelphia Flyers
- Playing career: 1977–1981 Coaching career

Current position
- Title: Commissioner
- Conference: CCHA

Biographical details
- Education: University of Notre Dame

Coaching career (HC unless noted)
- 1987–1993: Alaska–Fairbanks
- 1993–1999: Colorado College
- 1999–2018: Minnesota

Head coaching record
- Overall: 722–413–110 (.624)

Accomplishments and honors

Championships
- 2x NCAA national champions (2002, 2003); 7x NCAA Frozen Four Appearances (1995, 1996, 2002, 2003, 2005, 2012, 2014); 7x WCHA regular season champions (1994-1996, 2006, 2007, 2012, 2013); 3x WCHA tournament champions (2003, 2004, 2007); 4x Big Ten regular season champions (2014-2017); Big Ten Tournament Champions (2015); Great West regular season champions (1988)

Awards
- 3x WCHA Coach of the Year (1994, 1996, 2006); Spencer Penrose Award (1994); Big Ten Coach of the Year (2014)

Records
- Most Wins in Minnesota Hockey History (457)

Don Lucia (born August 20, 1958) is an American former ice hockey head coach, who was named as inaugural commissioner of the second Central Collegiate Hockey Association (CCHA) on June 17, 2020. The CCHA, which began play in the 2021–22 season, is a revival of an NCAA Division I men's hockey conference whose original version operated from 1971 to 2013 before folding in the wake of massive conference realignment in the sport.

== Coaching career ==
Lucia is best known for his 19-season tenure as head coach of the Minnesota Golden Gophers men's hockey team (1999–2018). He twice led the Golden Gophers to the NCAA national championship title, in 2002 and 2003. Under Lucia, the Golden Gophers won four MacNaughton Cups (awarded to the WCHA's regular season champion), the Broadmoor Trophy three times (awarded to the WCHA playoff champion), and the Big Ten regular season championship in each of that league's first four seasons. He coached one Hobey Baker Award winner, Jordan Leopold. He is one of 10 coaches to record more than 600 NCAA men's ice hockey wins, and one of four to win national titles in consecutive years. Lucia graduated from the University of Notre Dame in 1981, where he played defense for the school's hockey team.

During the 2008–2009 season, Lucia was diagnosed with sarcoidosis, but only missed four games while battling the autoimmune disease. This illness, combined with a growing number of college hockey players taking their talents to the NHL, led Lucia's Gophers to a 17–18–2 record during the 2009–2010 season. That season was Lucia's only year with a losing record with the Gophers, and his first since coaching Alaska-Fairbanks in the 1991–1992 season.

The Gophers eventually returned to the top of the WCHA, winning back-to-back conference titles in 2012 and 2013. In the summer of 2013 Minnesota joined with 5 other schools to form the Big Ten's ice hockey division. The Gophers won the inaugural regular season title and advanced all the way to the National Championship game where they fell to Union. Lucia won the first 4 Big Ten titles, but could only garner 1 conference tournament championship (2015) and despite the success in the Big Ten, Minnesota was not considered a contender for the NCAA title most years.

Minnesota finished 5th in 2018 and with many of the fans unhappy with the direction of the program, Lucia resigned after 19 years behind the bench.

== Personal life ==
Lucia and his wife Joyce have four children.

Both his sons were drafted in the NHL entry draft. Tony was selected in the 6th round of the 2005 NHL entry draft by the San Jose Sharks and Mario was selected in the 2nd round of the 2011 NHL entry draft by the Minnesota Wild.

== Head coaching record ==
Record table
Season	Team	Overall	Conference	Standing	Postseason
Alaska–Fairbanks Nanooks (GWHC) (1987–1988)
1987-88	Alaska–Fairbanks	21–10–2	5–3–0	1st	
Alaska–Fairbanks Nanooks Independent (1988–1993)
1988-89	Alaska–Fairbanks	21–12–3			
1989-90	Alaska–Fairbanks	10–20–9			
1990-91	Alaska–Fairbanks	17–16–2			
1991-92	Alaska–Fairbanks	7–27–1			
1992-93	Alaska–Fairbanks	23–12–2			
Alaska–Fairbanks:		99–97–19			
Colorado College Tigers (WCHA) (1993–1999)
1993-94	Colorado College	23–11–5	18–9–5	1st	WCHA first round
1994-95	Colorado College	30–12–1	22–9–1	1st	NCAA West Regional semifinals
1995-96	Colorado College	33–5–4	26–2–4	1st	NCAA runner-up
1996-97	Colorado College	25–15–4	17–11–4	T-4th	NCAA Frozen Four
1997-98	Colorado College	26–13–3	16–10–2	3rd	NCAA East Regional semifinals
1998-99	Colorado College	29–12–1	20–8–0	2nd	NCAA East Regional semifinals
Colorado College:		166–68–18	119–49–16		
Minnesota Golden Gophers (WCHA) (1999–2013)
1999-00	Minnesota	20–19–2	13–13–2	6th	WCHA third-place game (loss)
2000-01	Minnesota	27–13–2	18–8–2	3rd	NCAA East Regional Quarterfinals
2001-02	Minnesota	32–8–4	18–7–3	3rd	NCAA national champion
2002-03	Minnesota	28–8–9	15–6–7	T-2nd	NCAA national champion
2003-04	Minnesota	27–14–3	15–12–1	T-4th	NCAA Midwest Regional Final
2004-05	Minnesota	28–15–1	17–10–1	T-3rd	NCAA Frozen Four
2005-06	Minnesota	27–9–5	20–5–3	1st	NCAA West Regional semifinals
2006-07	Minnesota	31–10–3	18–7–3	1st	NCAA West Regional Final
2007-08	Minnesota	19–17–9	9–12–7	7th	NCAA Northeast Regional semifinals
2008-09	Minnesota	17–13–7	12–11–5	5th	WCHA Quarterfinal
2009-10	Minnesota	18–19–2	12–14–2	7th	WCHA first round
2010-11	Minnesota	16–14–6	13–10–5	5th	WCHA first round
2011-12	Minnesota	28–14–1	20–8–0	1st	NCAA Frozen Four
2012-13	Minnesota	26–9–5	16–7–5	T-1st	NCAA West Regional semifinals
Minnesota:		344–182–59	206–118–39		
Minnesota Golden Gophers (Big Ten) (2013–2018)
2013-14	Minnesota	28–7–6	14–3–3	1st	NCAA runner-up
2014-15	Minnesota	23–13–3	12–5–3	1st	NCAA Northeast Regional semifinals
2015-16	Minnesota	20–17–0	14–6–0	1st	Big Ten Runner-Up
2016-17	Minnesota	23–12–3	14–5–1	1st	NCAA Northeast Regional semifinals
2017-18	Minnesota	19–17–2	10–12–2	5th	
Minnesota:		113–66–14	64–31–9		
Total:		722–413–110 (.624)			
National champion Postseason invitational champion Conference regular season champion Conference regular season and conference tournament champion Division regular season champion Division regular season and conference tournament champion Conference tournament champion

== See also ==
- List of college men's ice hockey coaches with 400 wins

Awards and achievements
Preceded by George Gwozdecky	Spencer Penrose Award; 1993–94	Succeeded by Shawn Walsh
Preceded by Mike Sertich; George Gwozdecky; George Gwozdecky	WCHA Coach of the Year; 1993–94; 1995–96; 2005–06 (with Bob Motzko)	Succeeded by George Gwozdecky; Dean Blais; Bob Motzko/Jamie Russell
Preceded by Award Created	Big Ten Coach of the Year; 2013–14	Succeeded by Guy Gadowsky
