= Joe Battista =

American author, speaker, and hockey coach

Current position
- Title: Author, Professional Speaker, Owner of Pragmatic Passion, LLC Sports and Business Consulting

Biographical details
- Born: July 6, 1960 (age 66)

Coaching career (HC unless noted)
- 1987–2006: Penn State Icers

Accomplishments and honors

Championships
- American Collegiate Hockey Association National Championship (6x)

Awards
- American Hockey Coaches Association Lou Lamoriello Award American Collegiate Hockey Association Hall of Fame Pennsylvania Sports Hall of Fame Penn State Hockey Hall of Fame Penn Hills Hall of Fame

Joe Battista (born July 6, 1960) is a former American ice hockey coach and sports executive. He is the author of "The Power of Pragmatic Passion - 7 Common Sense Principles for Achieving Personal and Professional Success." From 2013 to 2015 he served as the Vice President of Hockey and Business Administration for the Buffalo Sabres of the National Hockey League (NHL) after 26 years at Penn State University. Since 2016 he has been the owner of Pragmatic Passion LLC consulting focusing on Keynote and Motivational Speaking, Success Coaching, and Business Development.

Battista graduated from Penn State University Smeal College of Business in 1983 with a degree in marketing. He has a total of 30 years coaching experience, with 512 wins and six ACHA national titles. Battista also coached Team USA in the 2003 World University Games. He is a member of the American Collegiate Hockey Association Hall of Fame, Pennsylvania Sports Hall of Fame, Penn State Hockey Hall of Fame, and the Penn Hills Hall of Fame.

Battista has also worked in a variety of sports marketing and management positions with the Pittsburgh Penguins and Culver Military Academy. After his coaching days at Penn State, Battista served as executive director of the Nittany Lion Club for the university from 2006 to 2009. He was awarded the Division of Development and Alumni Relations "Ridge Riley Lion's Pride Award". Later, he became Director of Major Gifts at Smeal College of Business.

During his administrative time at Penn State, Battista was instrumental in securing the largest donation in the university's history, an $88 million gift from Terry & Kim Pegula for a new ice facility and to have Penn State Hockey become a Division I team. Battista, serving as Associate Athletic Director for Ice Arena and Hockey Operations, oversaw the building of the new double sheet Pegula Ice Arena and the development of the new Division I Men's and Women's programs.

After his successful years at Penn State, he was hired by the Buffalo Sabres, which is owned by Terry & Kim Pegula to become Vice President of Hockey and Business Administration. After 2 years with the Sabres, he left to become a private sports and fundraising consultant.

In 2016, Battista would become executive director and Chief Development Officer for the Lock Haven University Foundation.

Battista left the Lock Haven University Foundation to focus on his own business, Pragmatic Passion, LLC as a motivational speaker and private consultant. He also serves as the Vice President of Business Development for the National Athletic and Professional Success Academy (NAPSA).
