= Bob Motzko =

American ice hockey coach (born 1961)

Robert Giles Motzko
Biographical details
- Born: March 27, 1961 (age 65); Austin, Minnesota, U.S.
- Education: St. Cloud State

Playing career
- 1979–1980: Austin Mavericks/Waterloo Black Hawks
- 1979–1980: Dubuque Fighting Saints
- 1983–1987: St. Cloud State
- Position: Forward

Coaching career (HC unless noted)
- 1986–87: St. Cloud State (assistant)
- 1986–91: North Iowa (USHL)
- 1991–1992: Miami (assistant)
- 1993–1994: Denver (assistant)
- 1994–1998: Miami (assistant)
- 1999–2001: Sioux Falls (USHL)
- 2001–2005: Minnesota (assistant)
- 2005–2018: St. Cloud State
- 2017–2018, 2026: US Men's National Junior Ice Team
- 2018–2026: Minnesota

Head coaching record
- Overall: 448–296–73 (.593)
- Tournaments: 12–13 (.480)

Accomplishments and honors

Championships
- 2013 WCHA Champion; 2014 NCHC Champion; 2016 NCHC Tournament champion; 2018 NCHC Champion; 2021 Big Ten Tournament champion

Awards
- 2× WCHA Coach of the Year (2006, 2007); 2× Herb Brooks Coach of the Year (2014, 2018); 3× Big Ten Coach of the Year (2020, 2022, 2023); Spencer Penrose Award (2023)

Robert Giles Motzko (born March 27, 1961) is an American ice hockey coach who was most recently the head coach of the University of Minnesota men's hockey team in Minneapolis, Minnesota, where he had previously served as Assistant Coach in 2001–05. He was previously the head coach of the St. Cloud State Huskies from 2005 to 2018. During his time at SCSU, he was named the WCHA Coach of the Year in 2006 and again in 2007.

In 2014, he was named the inaugural NCHC Herb Brooks Coach of the Year. In 2018, he won the Herb Brooks Coach of the Year for the second time. He guided the Huskies to six WCHA Final Five appearances (2006, 2007, 2008, 2010, 2012 and 2013), three NCHC Frozen Faceoff appearances (2015, 2016 and 2018), eight NCAA Division I tournament appearances (2007, 2008, 2010, 2013, 2014, 2015, 2016 and 2018), and one NCAA Division I Frozen Four appearance in 2013.

== Playing career ==
=== Waterloo and Austin ===
Motzko played for the Waterloo Black Hawks and the Austin Mavericks in the 1979–1980 season. That year, he had 16 goals, 10 assists, and 19 penalty minutes.

=== Dubuque Fighting Saints ===
In the 1980–1981 season, Motzko played for the Dubuque Fighting Saints of the United States Hockey League where he had 20 goals and 16 assists. That year, he helped the Saints win the Anderson Cup and the Clark Cup.

=== St. Cloud State ===
Motzko played for St. Cloud State University (SCSU) from 1983–1987. He was a two-year varsity letter winner for the SCSU hockey team from 1984–86.

== Coaching career ==
=== St. Cloud State ===
Motzko began his coaching career in 1986–87 as an assistant coach for the legendary Herb Brooks at SCSU – and also worked with former SCSU head coach Craig Dahl.

=== North Iowa ===
Motzko served as general manager and head coach of the USHL's North Iowa Huskies from 1987 through 1991. In 1989, Motzko led the North Iowa squad to a United States Junior A national championship and was named that year's USHL Coach of the Year.

=== Miami University and Denver ===
In 1991, Motzko was named associate head coach at Miami University in Oxford, Ohio, where he helped lead the RedHawks to a Central Collegiate Hockey Association title and an NCAA tournament berth in 1992–93. He served for one season as an associate head coach at the University of Denver from 1993–94, before returning to Miami University in 1994.

=== Sioux Falls Stampede ===
Motzko was named general manager and head coach of the USHL's Sioux Falls Stampede in 1998. He led the Stampede to a 77–31–6 record in the team's first two seasons in the USHL, and in 2000, he was named the USHL General Manager of the Year.

=== University of Minnesota ===
Motzko served as a men's hockey assistant coach at the University of Minnesota and was part of two NCAA Division I national championship teams in 2002 and 2003, and helped the Gophers win WCHA playoff crowns in 2003 and 2004.

=== Return to St. Cloud State ===
Motzko became the head coach at his alma mater, St. Cloud State, in 2005. In 2013, his contract was extended through the 2020–2021 season.

On March 26, 2010, Motzko led the Huskies to their first NCAA Tournament win in the West Regional at Xcel Energy Center. SCSU earned a 4–3 victory in double overtime against Northern Michigan University. The victory snapped an eight-game losing streak in the tournament for SCSU. St. Cloud fell in the West Regional Championship game to the University of Wisconsin the next night.

In the 2012–2013 season, Motzko led SCSU to a WCHA regular season championship, the Huskies' first regular season conference title. Though they secured the #1 seed, the Huskies shared the MacNaughton Cup with the University of Minnesota. On March 30–31, 2013, Motzko led the Huskies to a pair of NCAA Tournament victories over Notre Dame (5–1) and Miami University (4–1) at Huntington Center (Toledo) to advance to the first Frozen Four in school history. St. Cloud fell to Quinnipiac University in the Frozen Four on April 11, 2013, at Consol Energy Center.

In the 2013–14 season, Motzko led the Huskies to the inaugural NCHC regular season championship. Unlike in the 2012–13 season, the Huskies held the Penrose Cup alone. On March 29, 2014, Motzko led the Huskies to a win over Notre Dame (4–3 OT)in the NCAA tournament West Regional at Xcel Energy Center to advance to the Regional Championship for the second straight year, but fell to the University of Minnesota 4–0.

In the 2015–16 season, Motzko led the Huskies to a school record-tying 31 victories as well as the first NCHC conference tournament championship in school history, defeating the Duluth Bulldogs 3–1 in the Frozen Faceoff title game on March 19, 2016. The victory also gave Motzko and the Huskies their fourth straight NCAA Tournament berth, also tying a school record; they would fall to Ferris State University (5–4 OT) in the NCAA West Regional at Xcel Energy Center.

In the 2017–2018 season, the Huskies won their second Penrose Cup as NCHC regular season champions. They also qualified for the national tournament as the overall #1 seed.

=== United States men's national junior ice hockey team ===
In 2017, Motzko becomes head coach of the US national junior ice hockey team. He led them to the United States fourth-ever gold medal in the IIHF World Junior Championships.

=== Return to Minnesota ===
On March 27, 2018, Motzko was named the 15th head coach of the University of Minnesota, following Don Lucia's resignation. During the 2025–26 season, Minnesota finished with an 11–22–3 record, their worst record since 1972. Motzko and the University of Minnesota mutually agreed to part ways on March 18, 2026, ending his eight-year tenure with the team.

== Head coaching record ==
=== College ===
Record table
| Season | Team | Overall | Conference | Standing | Postseason |
|---|---|---|---|---|---|
St. Cloud State Huskies (WCHA) (2005–2013)
| 2005–06 | St. Cloud State | 22–16–4 | 13–13–2 | 6th | WCHA runner-up |
| 2006–07 | St. Cloud State | 22–11–7 | 14–7–7 | 2nd | NCAA East Regional semifinals |
| 2007–08 | St. Cloud State | 19–16–5 | 12–12–4 | t–4th | NCAA East Regional semifinals |
| 2008–09 | St. Cloud State | 18–17–3 | 13–13–2 | 6th | WCHA first round |
| 2009–10 | St. Cloud State | 24–14–5 | 15–9–4 | 3rd | NCAA West Regional Final |
| 2010–11 | St. Cloud State | 15–18–5 | 11–13–4 | t–8th | WCHA first round |
| 2011–12 | St. Cloud State | 17–17–5 | 12–12–4 | 6th | WCHA quarterfinals |
| 2012–13 | St. Cloud State | 25–16–1 | 18–9–1 | t–1st | NCAA Frozen Four |
| St. Cloud State: | | 162–125–35 | 108–88–28 | | |
St. Cloud State Huskies (NCHC) (2013–2018)
| 2013–14 | St. Cloud State | 22–11–5 | 15–6–3–0 | 1st | NCAA West Regional Final |
| 2014–15 | St. Cloud State | 20–19–1 | 11–12–1–0 | 6th | NCAA West Regional Final |
| 2015–16 | St. Cloud State | 31–9–1 | 17–6–1–1 | t–2nd | NCAA West Regional semifinals |
| 2016–17 | St. Cloud State | 16–19–1 | 10–13–1–0 | 5th | NCHC first round |
| 2017–18 | St. Cloud State | 25–9–6 | 16–4–4–1 | 1st | NCAA West Regional semifinals |
| St. Cloud State: | | 114–67–14 | 69–41–10–2 | | |
Minnesota Golden Gophers (Big Ten) (2018–2026)
| 2018–19 | Minnesota | 18–16–4 | 11–10–3–0 | 3rd | Big Ten semifinals |
| 2019–20 | Minnesota | 16–14–7 | 9–8–7–4 | T–2nd | Tournament cancelled |
| 2020–21 | Minnesota | 24–7–0 | 16–6–0 | 2nd | NCAA West Regional Final |
| 2021–22 | Minnesota | 26–13–0 | 18–6–0 | 1st | NCAA National semifinal |
| 2022–23 | Minnesota | 29–10–1 | 19–4–1 | 1st | NCAA Runner-Up |
| 2023–24 | Minnesota | 23–11–5 | 13–7–4 | 3rd | NCAA West Regional Final |
| 2024–25 | Minnesota | 25–11–4 | 15–6–3 | T–1st | NCAA Fargo Regional semifinals |
| 2025–26 | Minnesota | 11–22–3 | 7–15–2 | 6th | Big Ten quarterfinals |
| Minnesota: | | 172–104–24 | 108–62–21 | | |
| Total: | | 448–296–73 | | | |
National champion Postseason invitational champion Conference regular season champion Conference regular season and conference tournament champion Division regular season champion Division regular season and conference tournament champion Conference tournament champion

== Personal life ==
Motzko, a native of Austin, Minnesota, Bob and Shelley have had three children, a daughter, Ella, and two sons Mack and the youngest Beau.

On July 24, 2021, Mack died at the age of 20 from injuries sustained in a single car accident in which he was a passenger in Orono, Minnesota.

== See also ==
- List of college men's ice hockey coaches with 400 wins

Awards and achievements
| Preceded by Mike Hastings | Spencer Penrose Award; 2022–23 | Succeeded by Greg Brown |
| Preceded by George Gwozdecky; Don Lucia | WCHA Coach of the Year; 2005–06 (with Don Lucia); 2006–07 (with Jamie Russell) | Succeeded by Jamie Russell; Troy Jutting |
| Preceded by Award Created; Andy Murray | Herb Brooks Coach of the Year; 2013–14; 2017–18 | Succeeded by Dave Hakstol; Brett Larson |
| Preceded by Steve Rohlik; Tony Granato | Big Ten Coach of the Year; 2019–20; 2021–22, 2022–23 | Succeeded by Tony Granato; Adam Nightingale |
