= Tony Granato =

American ice hockey player and coach (born 1964)

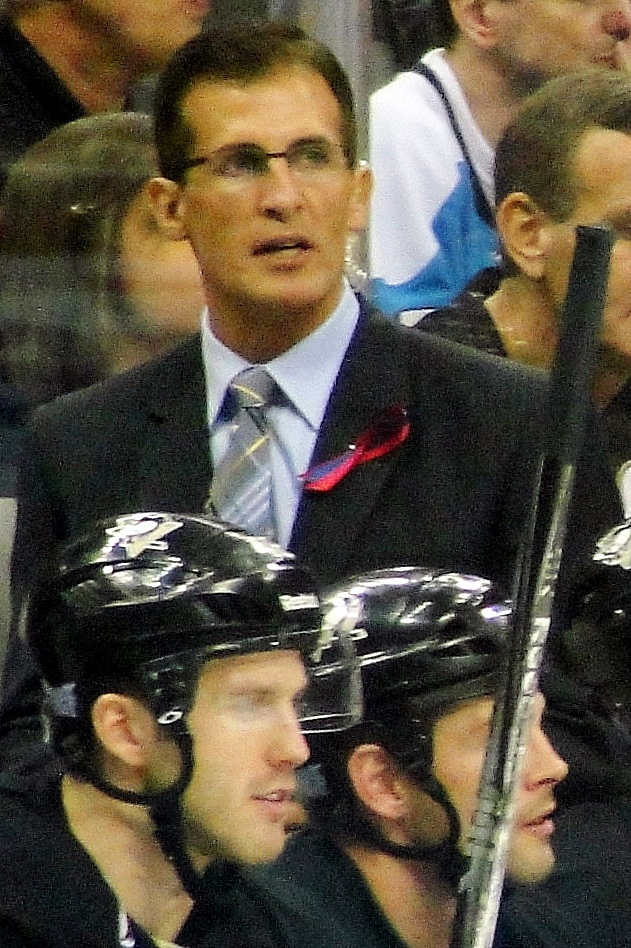
- Granato in 2011
- Born: July 25, 1964 (age 62) Downers Grove, Illinois, U.S.
- Height: 5 ft 11 in (180 cm)
- Weight: 185 lb (84 kg; 13 st 3 lb)
- Position: Left Wing
- Shot: Right
- Played for: New York Rangers; Los Angeles Kings; San Jose Sharks
- National team: United States
- NHL draft: 120th overall, 1982; New York Rangers
- Playing career: 1988–2001
- Coaching career

Biographical details
- Education: University of Wisconsin

Playing career
- 1983–1987: Wisconsin
- Position: Left Wing

Coaching career (HC unless noted)
- 2002: Colorado Avalanche (Asst.)
- 2002–2004: Colorado Avalanche
- 2005–2008: Colorado Avalanche (Asst.)
- 2008–2009: Colorado Avalanche
- 2009–2014: Pittsburgh Penguins (Asst.)
- 2014: Team USA (Asst.)
- 2014–2016: Detroit Red Wings (Asst.)
- 2016–2023: Wisconsin
- 2017: Team USA
- 2018: Team USA

Head coaching record
- Overall: 105–129–16 (.452) [College]
- Tournaments: 0–1 (.000)

Accomplishments and honors

Championships
- 2021 Big Ten Champion

Awards
- 2× Big Ten Coach of the Year (2017, 2021)

Anthony Lewis Granato (born July 25, 1964) is an American former professional ice hockey left winger and former head coach of the Wisconsin Badgers men's ice hockey team. He served as head coach of the United States men's national ice hockey team at the 2018 Winter Olympics. Previously, he was the head coach of the National Hockey League (NHL)'s Colorado Avalanche, as well as an assistant coach for the Detroit Red Wings and the Pittsburgh Penguins.

== Playing career ==
=== New York Rangers ===
After high school, Granato was drafted by the New York Rangers in the sixth round, 120th overall, in the 1982 NHL entry draft. After a college career at the University of Wisconsin–Madison, Granato made an immediate impact in his first season with the Rangers in 1988–89, leading the team in goals scored (36), which still stands as the team record for goals by a rookie. In what Rangers at the time called "the biggest [deal] in club history", Granato was traded with teammate Tomas Sandström to the Los Angeles Kings on January 20, 1990, in exchange for center Bernie Nicholls.

=== Los Angeles Kings ===
Granato continued to be a prolific goal scorer with the Kings and was a key player in their run to the 1993 Stanley Cup Final, contributing 17 points over the course of the playoffs. During a February 9, 1994, game in Los Angeles, Granato, after receiving a hard hit from the Chicago Blackhawks' Neil Wilkinson, retaliated by hitting Wilkinson in the head with a two-handed slash. Granato was subsequently suspended by the NHL for 15 games. As of 2012, this was the seventh-longest suspension in NHL history. On January 25, 1996, Granato suffered a serious head injury in a game against the Hartford Whalers that resulted in a bleeding on the left lobe of his brain. He underwent surgery and although there was speculation he would not play again, he returned to the ice in the 1996–97 NHL season after signing with the San Jose Sharks as a free agent.

=== San Jose Sharks ===
Granato returned to the ice in the 1996–97 NHL season with San Jose. Due to concerns of further brain injury, Granato wore a specially padded helmet as a precautionary measure. He had a productive first season in San Jose registering 25 goals and 15 assists in 76 games. In 1997, Granato received the Bill Masterton Memorial Trophy. However, his productivity steadily declined, with only 59 collective points in his remaining four seasons with the Sharks. He retired as a player after the 2001 season.

== Coaching career ==
Granato joined the Colorado Avalanche as an assistant coach prior to the 2002–03 NHL season. After a sub-par start to the season, the Avalanche fired head coach Bob Hartley on December 18, 2002, and Granato was subsequently promoted to replace him. Following the slow start under Hartley, the Avalanche went 32–11–4–4 under Granato and captured their ninth consecutive division title (including one title as the Quebec Nordiques). However, they lost in the first round of the 2003 Stanley Cup playoffs to the Minnesota Wild in seven games after a 3–1 series lead. In his first full season behind the bench, Granato led Colorado to a 40–22–20 record, finishing second in their division. During the 2004 Stanley Cup playoffs, the Avalanche defeated the Dallas Stars in five games in the quarter-finals, but lost to the Sharks in six games in the semi-finals.

After the disappointing playoff loss to the Sharks, Granato was replaced by Joel Quenneville. Granato was reassigned and agreed to stay on as an assistant, holding that position for three seasons. On May 22, 2008, Granato was renamed head coach of the Avalanche after the departure of Quenneville for the 2008–09 NHL season. The Avalanche posted a record of 32–45–5, the worst since the team moved from Quebec in 1995, and Granato was fired on June 5, 2009.

On August 5, 2009, Granato joined the coaching staff of the Pittsburgh Penguins, signing on as an assistant coach. Granato guided the Penguin's defense (2.49 goals against per game, tenth) and penalty killing (85.0 percent, fifth) to top-ten league finishes during the 2013–14 NHL season.

On June 25, 2014, it was announced the Penguins would not retain their coaching staff for the 2014–15 season.

On July 15, 2014, Granato was hired as an assistant coach for the Detroit Red Wings.

On March 30, 2016, Granato was named the head coach at his alma mater, the University of Wisconsin–Madison.

On August 4, 2017, Granato was announced as the head coach for the United States national team during the 2018 Winter Olympics. His team eventually placed seventh.

On March 6, 2023, University of Wisconsin Director of Athletics Chris McIntosh announced that Granato would not return for the 2023-24 season.

== Personal life ==
Granato is the older brother of Hall of Fame hockey player Cammi Granato, and is the brother-in-law of former NHL player Ray Ferraro. Tony and his wife, Linda, are the parents of four children. Tony still has a lot of personal connections to his hometown, Downers Grove. Siblings Don, Rob, and Cammi were influenced by the Chicago Blackhawks and the 1980 Winter Olympics USA gold medal. He is now (2023) a TV analyst for both the NHL and the Chicago Blackhawks.

On December 11, 2023, Granato announced that he had been diagnosed with Non-Hodgkin lymphoma, and that he would be taking a leave of absence from his television career to begin treatment on the cancer that same week. After a four week absence, Granato returned to broadcasting for the first time on January 7, 2024.

Granato is a Christian.

== Awards and achievements ==
Award	Year
All-WCHA Second Team	1984–85
AHCA West Second-Team All-American	1984–85
All-WCHA Second Team	1986–87
AHCA West Second-Team All-American	1986–87
NCAA (WCHA) Outstanding Student-Athlete of the Year	1986–87
NHL All-Rookie Team	1988–89
All-Star Game	1996–97
NHL Bill Masterton Memorial Trophy	1996–97
United States Hockey Hall of Fame	2020

== Career statistics ==
=== Regular season and playoffs ===
			Regular season					Playoffs
Season	Team	League	GP	G	A	Pts	PIM	GP	G	A	Pts	PIM
1981–82	Northwood School	HS-Prep	—	—	—	—	—	—	—	—	—	—
1982–83	Northwood School	HS-Prep	34	32	60	92	—	—	—	—	—	—
1983–84	University of Wisconsin	WCHA	35	14	17	31	48	—	—	—	—	—
1984–85	University of Wisconsin	WCHA	42	33	34	67	94	—	—	—	—	—
1985–86	University of Wisconsin	WCHA	32	25	24	49	36	—	—	—	—	—
1986–87	University of Wisconsin	WCHA	42	28	45	73	64	—	—	—	—	—
1987–88	United States	Intl	49	40	31	71	55	—	—	—	—	—
1987–88	Colorado Rangers	IHL	21	13	14	27	36	8	9	4	13	16
1988–89	New York Rangers	NHL	78	36	27	63	140	4	1	1	2	21
1989–90	New York Rangers	NHL	37	7	18	25	77	—	—	—	—	—
1989–90	Los Angeles Kings	NHL	19	5	6	11	45	10	5	4	9	12
1990–91	Los Angeles Kings	NHL	68	30	34	64	154	12	1	4	5	28
1991–92	Los Angeles Kings	NHL	80	39	29	68	187	6	1	5	6	10
1992–93	Los Angeles Kings	NHL	81	37	45	82	171	24	6	11	17	50
1993–94	Los Angeles Kings	NHL	50	7	14	21	150	—	—	—	—	—
1994–95	Los Angeles Kings	NHL	33	13	11	24	68	—	—	—	—	—
1995–96	Los Angeles Kings	NHL	49	17	18	35	46	—	—	—	—	—
1996–97	San Jose Sharks	NHL	76	25	15	40	159	—	—	—	—	—
1997–98	San Jose Sharks	NHL	59	16	9	25	70	1	0	0	0	0
1998–99	San Jose Sharks	NHL	35	6	6	12	54	6	1	1	2	2
1999–00	San Jose Sharks	NHL	48	6	7	13	39	12	0	1	1	14
2000–01	San Jose Sharks	NHL	61	4	5	9	65	4	1	0	1	4
NHL totals			774	248	244	492	1,425	79	16	27	43	141

=== International ===
Year	Team	Event	GP	G	A	Pts	PIM
1983	United States	WJC	7	4	0	4	0
1984	United States	WJC	7	1	3	4	6
1985	United States	WC	9	4	2	6	10
1986	United States	WC	8	2	7	9	8
1987	United States	WC	9	2	3	5	12
1988	United States	OG	6	1	7	8	4
1991	United States	CC	7	1	2	3	12
Junior totals			14	5	3	8	10
Senior totals			39	10	21	31	46

== Head coaching record ==
=== NHL ===
Team	Year	Regular season							Post season			
Team	Year	G	W	L	T	OTL	Pts	Finish	W	L	Win%	Result
COL	2002–03	51	32	11	4	4	(105)	1st in Northwest	3	4	.429	Lost in Conference Quarterfinals (MIN)
COL	2003–04	82	40	22	13	7	100	2nd in Northwest	6	5	.545	Lost in Conference Semifinals (SJ)
COL	2008–09	82	32	45	—	5	69	5th in Northwest	—	—	—	—
Total		215	104	78	17	16			9	9	.500	2 playoff appearances

=== College ===
Record table
Season	Team	Overall	Conference	Standing	Postseason
Wisconsin Badgers (Big Ten) (2016–2023)
2016–17	Wisconsin	20–15–1	12–8–0	2nd	Big Ten Runner-Up
2017–18	Wisconsin	14–19–4	8–13–3	6th	Big Ten Quarterfinal
2018–19	Wisconsin	14–18–5	9–10–5–2	5th	Big Ten Quarterfinal
2019–20	Wisconsin	14–20–2	7–15–2–2	7th	Big Ten Quarterfinal
2020–21	Wisconsin	20–10–1	17–6–1	1st	NCAA East Regional semifinals
2021–22	Wisconsin	10–24–3	6–17–1	T–5th	Big Ten Quarterfinal
2022–23	Wisconsin	13–23–0	6–18–0	7th	Big Ten Quarterfinal
Wisconsin:		105–129–16	65–87–12		
Total:		105–129–16			
National champion Postseason invitational champion Conference regular season champion Conference regular season and conference tournament champion Division regular season champion Division regular season and conference tournament champion Conference tournament champion

== See also ==
- List of NHL head coaches

Awards and achievements
Preceded by Award Created	WCHA Student-Athlete of the Year; 1987–88	Succeeded by Steve Johnson
Preceded by Jan Erixon	Steven McDonald Extra Effort Award Winner; 1988–89	Succeeded by Kelly Kisio / John Vanbiesbrouck
Preceded by Gary Roberts	Bill Masterton Memorial Trophy Winner; 1997	Succeeded by Jamie McLennan
Preceded by Red Berenson; Bob Motzko	Big Ten Coach of the Year; 2016–17; 2020–21	Succeeded by Steve Rohlik; Bob Motzko
Sporting positions
Preceded by Bob Hartley; Joel Quenneville	Colorado Avalanche head coach 2002–04; 2008–09	Succeeded by Joel Quenneville; Joe Sacco
