= 2015 Big Ten men's ice hockey tournament =

- Dates: March 19–21, 2015
- Teams: 6
- Finals site: Joe Louis Arena; Detroit, Michigan
- Champions: Minnesota (1st title)
- Winning coach: Don Lucia (1st title)
- MVP: Adam Wilcox (Minnesota)
- Big Ten men's Ice Hockey Tournaments

The 2015 Big Ten Conference Men's Ice Hockey Tournament was the second tournament in conference history played between March 19 and March 21, 2015, at Joe Louis Arena in Detroit, Michigan. The winner of the tournament was the Minnesota Golden Gophers, who earned the Big Ten's automatic bid to the 2015 NCAA Division I Men's Ice Hockey Tournament.

== Format ==
All six Big Ten teams participated in the tournament, which was a single-elimination format. Teams were seeded No. 1 through No. 6 according to the final regular season conference standings. In the quarterfinals, No. 3 played No. 6 and No. 4 played No. 5. In the semifinals, No. 2 played the winner of the first game and No. 1 played the winner of the second game (the teams were not reseeded). The two semifinal winners played each other in the Championship Game.

=== Conference standings ===
Note: GP = Games played; W = Wins; L = Losses; T = Ties; PTS = Points; GF = Goals For; GA = Goals Against

2014–15 Big Ten ice hockey standings
	Conference record								Overall record					
	GP	W	L	T	SOW	PTS	GF	GA	GP	W	L	T	GF	GA
#12 Minnesota^{†}^{*}	20	12	5	3	0	39	81	54	39	23	13	3	137	982
Michigan State	20	11	7	2	2	37	47	42	35	17	16	2	83	80
#20 Michigan	20	12	8	0	0	36	88	60	37	22	15	0	143	107
Penn State	20	10	9	1	0	31	62	66	37	18	15	4	119	113
Ohio State	20	8	11	1	0	26	56	71	36	14	19	3	98	117
Wisconsin	20	2	15	3	2	11	34	75	35	4	26	5	59	129
Championship: March 21, 2015 † indicates conference regular season champion; * indicates conference tournament champion Rankings: USCHO.com Top 20 Poll; updated March 14, 2015

== Bracket ==
Quarterfinals; March 19
4	Penn State	1
5	Ohio State	3
3	Michigan	5
6	Wisconsin	1

Semifinals; March 20
1	Minnesota	3
5	Ohio State	0
2	Michigan State	1
3	Michigan	4

Championship; March 21
1	Minnesota	4
3	Michigan	2

Note: * denotes overtime periods.

=== Quarterfinals ===
All times are local (EST) (UTC−4).

==== (4) Penn State vs. (5) Ohio State ====
March 19	Penn State	1 – 3	Ohio State	Joe Louis Arena	Recap
No scoring		First period	8:01 - Nick Schilkey (10) - (Gust); 14:13 - Justin DaSilva (2) - (Fritz, Christofoli)
Max Gardiner (5) - (Olczyk) - 9:38		Second period	19:00 - David Gust (3) - (Jardine)
No scoring		Third period	No scoring
Eamon McAdam (26 saves / 29 shots)		Goalie stats	Christian Frey (31 saves / 32 shots)

==== (3) Michigan vs. (6) Wisconsin ====
March 19	Michigan	5 – 1	Wisconsin	Joe Louis Arena	Recap
Zach Hyman (20) - (Larkin, Werenski) - PP - 14:45		First period	No scoring
Andrew Sinelli (1) - (Nieves, Dancs) - 2:05; Zach Hyman (21) - (Martin, Larkin) - 4:48		Second period	No scoring
Dylan Larkin (15) - (Sinelli, Selman) - 14:23; Justin Selman (11) - (Larkin, Hyman) - 17:39		Third period	9:14 - Jedd Soleway (7) - (Hughes)
Steve Racine (28 saves / 29 shots)		Goalie stats	Joel Rumpel (23 saves / 28 shots)

=== Semifinals ===
==== (1) Minnesota vs. (5) Ohio State ====
March 20	Minnesota	3 – 0	Ohio State	Joe Louis Arena	Recap
No scoring		First period	No scoring
Sam Warning (12) - (Boyd) - 7:51		Second period	No scoring
Vinni Lettieri (9) - (Marshall, Cammarata) - 10:45; Travis Boyd (17) - (unassisted) - EN SH - 15:40		Third period	No scoring
Adam Wilcox ( 39 saves / 39 shots )		Goalie stats	Christian Frey ( 21 saves / 23 shots )

==== (2) Michigan State vs. (3) Michigan ====
March 20	Michigan State	1 – 4	Michigan	Joe Louis Arena	Recap
No scoring		First period	12:59 - PP - Michael Downing (6) - (Copp, Motte)
Matt Berry (12) - (MacEachern, Jacobs) - PP - 8:41		Second period	11:36 - J. T. Compher (12) - (Kile)
No scoring		Third period	9:14 - Cristoval Nieves (7) - (Dancs, Motte); 13:40 - Alex Kile (12) - (Nieves)
Jake Hildebrand (45 saves / 49 shots)		Goalie stats	Steve Racine (26 saves / 27 shots)

=== Championship ===
==== (1) Minnesota vs. (3) Michigan ====
March 21	Minnesota	4 – 2	Michigan	Joe Louis Arena	Recap
No scoring		First period	No scoring
Travis Boyd (18) - (Rau, Cammarata) - PP - 2:30; Kyle Rau (20) - (Fasching, Bristedt) - 10:34		Second period	3:56 - PP - Zach Hyman (22) (unassisted); 6:14 - PP - Alex Kile (13) - (Nieves, Hyman)
Justin Kloos (13) - (Fasching, Bristedt) - PP - 9:29; Travis Boyd (19) (unassisted) - EN - 19:38		Third period	No scoring
Adam Wilcox (24 saves / 26 shots)		Goalie stats	Steve Racine (28 saves / 31 shots)

=== Tournament awards ===
==== Most Outstanding Player ====
- Goaltender: Adam Wilcox

==== All-Tournament Team ====
- Goaltender: Adam Wilcox (Minnesota)
- Defensemen: Michael Downing (Michigan), Mike Reilly (Minnesota)
- Forwards: Zach Hyman (Michigan), Travis Boyd (Minnesota), Kyle Rau (Minnesota)
