= 2018 Big Ten men's ice hockey tournament =

- Dates: March 2–17, 2018
- Teams: 7
- Finals site: Compton Family Ice Arena; Notre Dame, Indiana
- Champions: Notre Dame (1st title)
- Winning coach: Jeff Jackson (1st title)
- MVP: Cale Morris (Notre Dame)
- Big Ten men's Ice Hockey Tournaments

The 2018 Big Ten Conference Men's Ice Hockey Tournament was the fifth tournament in conference history. It was played between March 2 and March 17, 2018, on campus locations. The winner of the tournament was the Notre Dame Fighting Irish, who earned the Big Ten's automatic bid to the 2018 NCAA Division I Men's Ice Hockey Tournament.

== Format ==
The 2018 tournament featured a new three-weekend format with all games taking place on the campus of the higher-seeded teams. The tournament opened March 2–4 with three best-of-three quarterfinal series, as the second-, third-and fourth-seeded teams each hosted a series. The top-seeded team had a bye to the single-elimination semifinals, which was played on March 10. The highest-seeded team remaining after the semifinals hosted a championship game on March 17.

=== Conference standings ===
Note: GP = Games played; W = Wins; L = Losses; T = Ties; PTS = Points; GF = Goals For; GA = Goals Against

2017–18 Big Ten ice hockey standings
	Conference record								Overall record					
	GP	W	L	T	SOW	PTS	GF	GA	GP	W	L	T	GF	GA
#2 Notre Dame†*	24	17	6	1	1	53	66	47	40	28	10	2	117	87
#3 Ohio State	24	14	8	2	1	45	77	55	41	26	10	5	131	85
#4 Michigan	24	11	10	3	2	38	70	72	40	22	15	3	136	121
#13 Penn State	24	9	10	5	2	34	70	72	38	18	15	5	138	120
#18 Minnesota	24	10	12	2	1	33	65	69	38	19	17	2	102	100
Wisconsin	24	8	13	3	1	28	69	83	37	14	19	4	115	124
Michigan State	24	6	16	2	1	21	53	77	36	12	22	2	91	117
Championship: March 17, 2018 † indicates conference regular season champion * indicates conference tournament champion Rankings: USCHO.com Top 20 Poll; updated March 12, 2018

== Bracket ==
Quarterfinals; March 2–4
2	Ohio State	6	4*	—
7	Michigan State	2	3	—
3	Michigan	6	7	—
6	Wisconsin	5	4	—
4	Penn State	5	6	—
5	Minnesota	3	5	—

Semifinals; March 10
1	Notre Dame	3
4	Penn State	2
2	Ohio State	3*
3	Michigan	2

Championship; March 17
1	Notre Dame	3*
2	Ohio State	2

Note: * denotes overtime periods.

=== Quarterfinals ===
==== (2) Ohio State vs. (7) Michigan State ====
March 2	Ohio State	6 – 2	Michigan State	Value City Arena	Recap
(Ege, Jobst) Tanner Laczynski – PP – 18:42		First period	No scoring
(Laczynski, Ege) Matthew Weis – PP – 16:32		Second period	03:12 – Patrick Khodorenko (Hirose, Stevens)
(Parran, Joyaux) Mason Jobst – GW – 01:54 (Stork, McCormick) Sasha Larocque – 06:36 (Kearney, Jobst) John Wiitala – 15:40 (Pooley, Kearney) Christian Lampasso – PP – 19:59		Third period	18:38 – Damian Chrcek (Osburn, Esteves)
( 18 saves / 20 shots ) Sean Romeo		Goalie stats	John Lethemon ( 25 saves / 29 shots ) / Ed Minney ( 9 saves / 11 shots )

March 3	Ohio State	4 – 3	OT	Michigan State	Value City Arena	Recap
(Weis, Ege) Mason Jobst – PP – 11:09		First period		19:33 – PP – Cody Milan (Khodorenko)
(Kearney) Mason Jobst – 07:43 (Jobst) John Wiitala – 11:22		Second period		00:29 – Patrick Khodorenko (Hirose, Lewandowski); 08:05 – Tommy Apap (Keefer)
No scoring		Third period		No scoring
(Larocque) Freddy Gerard – GW – 05:53		First overtime period		No scoring
( 15 saves / 18 shots ) Sean Romeo		Goalie stats		John Lethemon ( 38 saves / 42 shots )

Ohio State won series 2–0

==== (3) Michigan vs. (7) Wisconsin ====
March 2	Michigan	6 – 5	Wisconsin	Yost Ice Arena	Recap
(Marody, Cecconi) Tony Calderone – 01:40 (Hughes, Cecconi) Tony Calderone – PP – 13:14 (Piazza, Martin) Jake Slaker – PP – 16:22 (Marody) Quinn Hughes – PP – 18:09		First period	03:58 – Tyler Inamoto (Malone); 06:59 – Matthew Freytag (Malone, Kalynuk); 08:03 – Ryan Wagner (Frederic, Tischke)
(Hughes, Cecconi) Tony Calderone – PP – 03:20		Second period	10:00 – PP – Linus Weissbach (Kalynuk, Wagner)
(Marody, Hughes) Tony Calderone – GW – 11:07		Third period	19:56 – PP – Ryan Wagner (Hughes, Frederic)
( 48 saves / 53 shots ) Hayden Lavigne		Goalie stats	Kyle Hayton ( 23 saves / 29 shots )

March 3	Michigan	7 – 4	Wisconsin	Yost Ice Arena	Recap
(Calderone) Dexter Dancs – 04:18 (Pastujov, Sanchez) Jack Becker – 13:41		First period	00:23 – Trent Frederic (Wagner, Tischke)
(Hughes, Norris) Brendan Warren – 00:53 (Porikos, Cecconi) Dakota Raabe – 06:34 (Calderone) Dexter Dancs – GW – 19:52		Second period	06:08 – Cameron Hughes (Weissbach, Baker); 09:16 – Trent Frederic (Weissbach, Greenway)
(Boka, Pastujov) Griffin Luce – 02:24 (Cecconi, Norris) Jake Slaker – EN – 19:41		Third period	15:18 – Matthew Freytag (Davison)
( 28 saves / 32 shots ) Hayden Lavigne		Goalie stats	Jack Berry ( 22 saves / 28 shots )

Michigan won series 2–0

==== (4) Penn State vs. (5) Minnesota ====
March 2	Penn State	5 – 3	Minnesota	Pegula Ice Arena	Recap
(Smirnov, Limoges) Cole Hults – PP – 15:39		First period	11:13 – PP – Casey Mittelstadt (Lindgren, Pitlick)
(Myllari, Autio) Nate Sucese – PP – 02:35 (Murray, Biro) Denis Smirnov – 18:49 (Hamilton, Jones) Andrew Sturtz – GW – 19:45		Second period	15:13 – Scott Reedy (Pitlick)
(Sturtz) Evan Barratt – EN – 19:30		Third period	15:00 – PP – Casey Mittelstadt (Pitlick, Reedy)
( 32 saves / 35 shots ) Peyton Jones		Goalie stats	Mat Robson ( 25 saves / 29 shots )

March 3	Penn State	6 – 5	Minnesota	Pegula Ice Arena	Recap
(Berger, Sturtz) Trevor Hamilton – 00:16 (Barratt, Limoges) Liam Folkes – 13:01		First period	No scoring
(Limoges, Hamilton) Evan Barratt – PP – 04:37 (Berger, Sternschein) James Robinson – 17:50		Second period	02:06 – PP – Casey Mittelstadt (unassisted); 19:31 – Jack Ramsey (Norman, Romanko); 12:48 – Rem Pitlick (Reedy); 15:21 – PP – Scott Reedy (Mittelstadt, Lindgren)
(Sucese, Folkes) Brandon Biro – PP – 07:54 (Folkes, Gobetz) Evan Barratt – GW – 11:25		Third period	04:00 – Scott Reedy (Mittelstadt, Pitlick)
( 35 saves / 40 shots ) Peyton Jones		Goalie stats	Eric Schierhorn ( 29 saves / 35 shots )

Penn State won series 2–0

=== Semifinals ===
==== (1) Notre Dame vs. (4) Penn State ====
March 10	University of Notre Dame	3 – 2	Penn State University	Compton Family Ice Arena	Recap
(Malmquist, Burke) Jordan Gross – 06:18 (Wegwerth, Hellickson) Andrew Peeke – PP – 14:03		First period	11:43 – Nate Sucese (Biro, Autio); 15:43 – Brandon Biro (Sucese, Autio)
No scoring		Second period	No scoring
(Malmquist, Oglevie) Jack Jenkins – 08:01		Third period
( 43 saves / 45 shots ) Cale Morris		Goalie stats	Peyton Jones ( 44 saves / 47 shots )

==== (2) Ohio State vs. (3) Michigan ====
March 10	Ohio State	3 – 2	OT	Michigan	Nationwide Arena	Recap
(Miller, Joshua) Gordi Myer – PP – 16:02		First period		No scoring
No scoring		Second period		11:16 – Cooper Marody (Hughes, Dancs)
(Wiitala, Miller) Dakota Joshua – PP – 04:01		Third period		05:51 – Cooper Marody (Hughes, Calderone)
(Laczynski, Ege) Matthew Weis – GW – 14:03		First overtime period		No scoring
( 29 saves / 31 shots ) Sean Romeo		Goalie stats		Hayden Lavigne ( 32 saves / 35 shots )

=== Championship ===
==== (1) Notre Dame vs. (2) Ohio State ====
March 17	Notre Dame	3 – 2	OT	Ohio State	Compton Family Ice Arena	Recap
(Evans, Nardella) Bo Brauer – 04:09 (Burke, Peeke) Matt Hellickson – PP – 14:30 (Boje) Jordan Himley – PP – 15:34		First period		No scoring
No scoring		Second period		06:21 – Brendon Kearney (Miller, Myer)
No scoring		Third period		01:07 – Matt Miller (Laczynski)
(Evans, Gilbert) Cam Morrison – GW – 09:23		First overtime period		No scoring
( 41 saves / 43 shots ) Cale Morris		Goalie stats		Sean Romeo ( 35 saves / 38 shots )

== Tournament awards ==
=== All-Tournament Team ===
- G Cale Morris* (Notre Dame)
- D Jordan Gross (Notre Dame)
- D Matt Miller (Ohio State)
- F Cam Morrison (Notre Dame)
- F Mason Jobst (Ohio State)
- F Tanner Laczynski (Ohio State)

* Most Outstanding Player(s)
