= 2014 Big Ten men's ice hockey tournament =

- Dates: March 20–22, 2014
- Teams: 6
- Finals site: Xcel Energy Center; Saint Paul, Minnesota
- Champions: Wisconsin (1st title)
- Winning coach: Mike Eaves (1st title)
- MVP: Mark Zengerle (Wisconsin)
- Big Ten men's Ice Hockey Tournaments

The 2014 Big Ten Conference Men's Ice Hockey Tournament was the first tournament in conference history, and was played between March 20 and March 22, 2014 at the Xcel Energy Center in Saint Paul, Minnesota. The winner of the tournament was the Wisconsin Badgers, who earned the Big Ten's automatic bid to the 2014 NCAA Division I Men's Ice Hockey Tournament.

== Format ==
All six Big Ten teams participated in the tournament, which was a single-elimination format. Teams were seeded No. 1 through No. 6 according to the final regular season conference standings. In the quarterfinals on Thursday, No. 3 played No. 6 and No. 4 played No. 5. On Friday, No. 2 played the winner of the first game and No. 1 played the winner of the second game (the teams were not reseeded). The two semifinal winners played each other on Saturday in the final.

=== Conference standings ===
Note: GP = Games played; W = Wins; L = Losses; T = Ties; PTS = Points; GF = Goals For; GA = Goals Against

2013–14 Big Ten ice hockey standings
	Conference record								Overall record					
	GP	W	L	T	SOW	PTS	GF	GA	GP	W	L	T	GF	GA
#2 Minnesota^{†}	20	14	3	3	0	45	59	37	41	28	7	6	143	86
#7 Wisconsin*	20	13	6	1	0	40	63	46	37	24	11	2	120	95
#16 Michigan	20	10	8	2	1	33	68	59	35	18	13	4	107	89
#20 Ohio State	20	6	9	5	4	27	53	55	37	18	14	5	119	100
Michigan State	20	5	9	6	4	25	42	55	36	11	18	7	79	93
Penn State	20	3	16	1	0	10	42	75	36	8	26	2	80	129
Championship: Wisconsin † indicates conference regular season champion; * indicates conference tournament champion Rankings: USCHO.com Top 20 Poll; updated March 23, 2014

== Bracket ==
Quarterfinals; March 20
3	Michigan	1
6	Penn State	2**
4	Ohio State	2*
5	Michigan State	1

Semifinals; March 21
2	Wisconsin	2
6	Penn State	1
1	Minnesota	1
4	Ohio State	3

Championship; March 22
2	Wisconsin	5*
4	Ohio State	4

Note: * denotes overtime periods

=== Quarterfinals ===
All times are local (UTC−5).

==== (3) Michigan vs. (6) Penn State ====
March 20	Michigan	1–2	2OT	Penn State	Xcel Energy Center	Recap
No scoring		First period		No scoring
No scoring		Second period		19:37 - Taylor Holstrom (8) - (Juha, Goodwin)
Phil Di Giuseppe (13) - (Nieves) - 11:06		Third period		No scoring
No scoring		Second overtime period		12:47 - Zach Saar (5) - (Richard)
Zach Nagelvoort (63 saves / 65 shots)		Goalie stats		Matthew Skoff (52 saves / 53 shots)

==== (4) Ohio State vs. (5) Michigan State ====
March 20	Ohio State	2–1	OT	Michigan State	Xcel Energy Center	Recap
No scoring		First period		4:04 - Greg Wolfe (13) - (Reimer)
Tanner Fritz (7) - (Greco, Gedig) - 16:26		Second period		No scoring
No scoring		Third period		No scoring
Drew Brevig (3) - (Fritz, McCormick) - 4:23		First overtime period		No scoring
Christian Frey (26 saves / 27 shots)		Goalie stats		Jake Hildebrand (32 saves / 34 shots)

=== Semifinals ===
All times are local (UTC−5).

==== (2) Wisconsin vs. (6) Penn State ====
March 21	Wisconsin	2–1	Penn State	Xcel Energy Center	Recap
No scoring		First period	No scoring
Michael Mersch (21) - (Dahl, Zulinick) - 1:27; Michael Mersch (22) - PP - (Zengerle, Kerdiles) - 19:49		Second period	0:55 - Curtis Loik - (Brooks, Glen)
No scoring		Third period	No scoring
Joel Rumpel (24 saves / 25 shots)		Goalie stats	Matthew Skoff (32 saves / 34 shots)

==== (1) Minnesota vs. (4) Ohio State ====
March 21	Minnesota	1–3	Ohio State	Xcel Energy Center	Recap
No scoring		First period	15:20 - PP - Nick Schilkey (13) - (Fritz, McCormick)
Kyle Rau (12) - (Cammarata, Boyd) - 4:47		Second period	No scoring
No scoring		Third period	9:08 - Ryan Dzingel (21) - (Lundey); 19:33 - EN - Anthony Greco (5) - (Brevig)
Adam Wilcox (22 saves / 24 shots)		Goalie stats	Christian Frey (30 saves / 31 shots)

=== Championship ===
All times are local (UTC−5).

==== (2) Wisconsin vs. (4) Ohio State ====
March 22	Wisconsin	5–4	OT	Ohio State	Xcel Energy Center	Recap
Jake McCabe (8) - (Zengerle, Kerdiles) - PP - 19:37		First period		4:51 - Ryan Dzingel (22) - (Oddo, Brevig); 8:56 - Nick Oddo (9) - (Schilkey, Dzingel)
Morgan Zulinick (4) - (Soleway, Simonelli) - PP - 11:24		Second period		12:40 - Clark Cristofoli (1) - (McCormick, Oddo)
Jefferson Dahl (4) - (Zulinick, McCabe) - 13:38; Tyler Barnes (13) (Kerdiles, Zengerle) - 13:56		Third period		13:08 - Tanner Fritz (8) - (McCormick, Cristofoli)
Mark Zengerle (10) - (Barnes, Kerdiles) - 7:48		First overtime period		No scoring
Joel Rumpel (28 saves / 32 shots)		Goalie stats		Christian Frey (31 saves / 36 shots)

=== Tournament awards ===
==== Most Outstanding Player ====
- Center: Mark Zengerle

==== All-Tournament Team ====
- Goaltender: Christian Frey (Ohio State)
- Defensemen: Drew Brevig (Ohio State), Frankie Simonelli (Wisconsin)
- Forwards: Ryan Dzingel (Ohio State), Michael Mersch (Wisconsin), Mark Zengerle (Wisconsin)
