= Penn State Nittany Lions men's ice hockey =

- Current season
- University: Pennsylvania State University
- Conference: Big Ten
- Governing Body: NCAA
- First season: 1909–10
- Athletic director: Pat Kraft
- Head coach: Guy Gadowsky; 13th season, 218–186–31 .537
- Assistant coaches: Juliano Pagliero; Andrew Sturtz; Vince Pedrie
- Arena: Pegula Ice Arena; University Park, Pennsylvania
- Student section: Roar Zone
- Colors: Blue and white
- Fight song: Fight On, State
- Mascot: Nittany Lion

NCAA tournament Frozen Four
- 2025

NCAA tournament appearances
- 2017, 2018, 2023, 2025, 2026

ACHA tournament champions
- 1984, 1990, 1998, 2000, 2001, 2002, 2003

Conference tournament champions
- Big Ten: 2017

Conference regular season champions
- Big Ten: 2020

Penn State Nittany Lions men's ice hockey, formerly known as the Penn State Icers (the name for the former ACHA team), is a college ice hockey program that represents the Pennsylvania State University. Prior to the 2012–13 season the program was designated a club sport and competed at the ACHA Division I level. PSU was previously a member of the Eastern States Collegiate Hockey League (ESCHL, although the team competed as an independent ACHA D-I member for the 2011–12 season before moving to the NCAA D-I level. They play at the Pegula Ice Arena in University Park, Pennsylvania.

== History ==
Penn State ice hockey was inaugurated in 1938, aside from two games in 1909–10. Penn State fielded a varsity hockey team for five seasons in the 1940s (1940–44, 1946–47) before the sport was dropped due to limited facilities.

=== ACHA years ===
The current program traces its roots back to 1971 when the program was restarted at the non-NCAA level. Consensus in the ice hockey community considered Penn State to play on a level comparable to NCAA Division III teams, with whom Penn State routinely scheduled games prior to the move to Division I. The Icers also played Division I, in-state opponent Robert Morris.

When the program was resumed in 1971, it began playing a mix of non-NCAA club teams, NAIA teams and DIII teams. In the 1975–76 season Penn State became the first college ice hockey team to play in Europe. The team moved to the on-campus Greenberg Ice Pavilion, now known as the Penn State Ice Pavilion, in 1980. The 1,350-seat facility was the home of PSU hockey until 2013. From 1971 to 2012, Penn State teams won 7 ACHA National Championships, were runners-up 9 times, appeared in 29 ACHA postseason tournaments (including 10 consecutive championship games), won 9 conference playoff titles and recorded 8 conference regular season championships.

In the program's final season as a member of the ACHA, the team was led by Guy Gadowsky, who stayed on to coach as the team began play in the NCAA. Gadowsky brought a number of transfers and recruits for the NCAA DI team to prepare for a transition from club to varsity status. The team finished the regular season with a record of 27–4 and received a bid to the 2012 ACHA DI National tournament as the number one seed and ranked first in the ACHA. In the tournament, the Icers defeated West Virginia 4–1, followed by Oklahoma 6–3. In the semifinal round, Penn State faced Oakland (MI), who were ranked as the thirteenth seed. The game was a rematch of 2007 ACHA championship when the Golden Grizzlies upset the Icers. In a repeat of 2007, Oakland ended Penn State's season and era in the ACHA by a score of 5–3. The Icers finished the season with an overall record of 29–5, 29–4 in ACHA competition and a 6–3 loss to NCAA Division III Neumann at Citizens Bank Park in Philadelphia as part of the 2012 NHL Winter Classic events in front of a crowd of 6,800.

=== Move to NCAA ===
Over the summer of 2010 it was reported that Penn State athletic director Tim Curley and Terrence Pegula, a PSU alumnus, billionaire hockey fan, and possible large donor visited Minnesota's hockey facilities and the new on-campus Notre Dame Ice Arena currently under construction at Notre Dame and other Central Collegiate Hockey Association (CCHA) schools. Pegula, who would eventually go on to purchase the Buffalo Sabres, donated US$88 million (later upgraded to US$102 million) to the Penn State hockey programs for the purpose of building an arena. In August 2010 Tom Anastos, CCHA commissioner said the CCHA was interested in adding Penn State as a 12th member after Nebraska-Omaha left the league to join the Western Collegiate Hockey Association (WCHA). Without a women's league the women's team would not join the CCHA, speculation had the women's team joining College Hockey America (CHA), currently a 5-team league with teams in Michigan, Pennsylvania and New York.

On September 17, 2010, after years of speculation, it was officially announced the program would move to the National Collegiate Athletic Association (NCAA) Division I level along with the PSU women's ice hockey team starting in the 2012–13 season and the program would initially compete as an independent team until the new arena was completed in 2013. The university also announced the construction of a new 6,000-seat ice arena to replace the undersized and aging 1,350-seat Penn State Ice Pavilion.

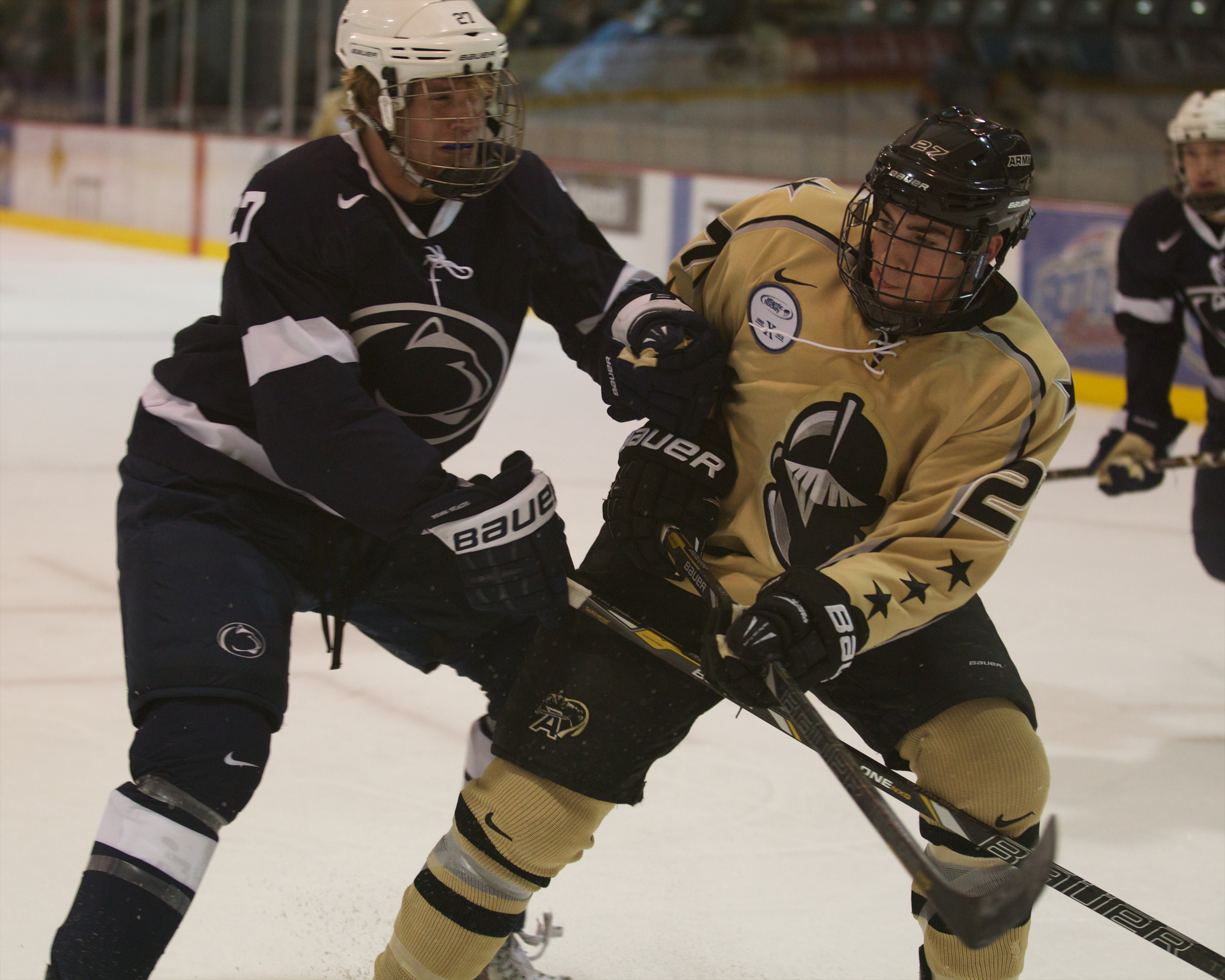
A game between Penn State and Army in 2012, Penn State's first season at the Division-I level

Following the announcement by Penn State, the Big Ten Conference announced that the conference planned to begin sponsoring men's ice hockey in the 2013–14 season combining Penn State with Michigan State University, University of Michigan, and Ohio State University from the CCHA as well as the University of Minnesota and the University of Wisconsin from the WCHA to form the six-member Big Ten Hockey Conference.

On March 26, 2015, Casey Bailey became the first Penn State player to play in the National Hockey League, debuting for the Toronto Maple Leafs in a 4–1 loss to the Florida Panthers.

In 2017, Penn State defeated Wisconsin to capture their first Big Ten Tournament championship. Freshman goaltender Peyton Jones earned the tournament's 2017 Most Outstanding Player Award. Four Nittany Lions made the All-Tournament Team: Jones, forward Liam Folkes, and defensemen Vince Pedrie and Erik Autio. In their first NCAA tournament game, Penn State notched 10 goals en route to a 10–3 victory. This marked the first time in team history that Penn State scored more than 8 goals in a varsity game. It also marked the most goals scored by a team in an NCAA tournament game since 1990.

=== Program record ===
Prior to NCAA D1 status

First year: 1909–10
Varsity seasons: 5 (1940–44, 1946–47)
Varsity record: 13–15–1
Non-varsity seasons: 45 (1909–10, 1937–40, 1971–2012)
Non-varsity record: 962–307–44–11
ACHA National Championships: 7 (1984, 1990, 1998, 2000, 2001, 2002, 2003)
ACHA National Runners-Up: 9 (1983, 1985, 1993, 1995, 1999, 2004, 2005, 2006, 2007)

== The Roar Zone ==
The Roar Zone is the official student section for Penn State Men's Ice Hockey. Founded in 2013, the Roar Zone was created when Penn State Hockey became a Division I team and moved play from the Greenburg Ice Pavilion to the newly built Pegula Ice Arena. The Roar Zone became an official Penn State University club in early 2015 and is frequently featured on ESPN and Big Ten Network game coverages.

The Roar Zone holds more than 1,000 students on bleachers built to be the steepest allowed by code. All Penn State Hockey student season ticket holders are members of this organization.

The Roar Zone frequently works with Penn State Athletics to plan away game bus trips to watch conference and non-conference games. Notable trips include a bus trip to watch Penn State play in Madison Square Garden for the first time on January 30, 2016 and Penn State win an overtime win at the Munn Ice Arena on February 13, 2015.

== Season-by-season results ==
Source:

== Records vs. Big Ten teams ==
As of the completion of 2021–22 season

School	Team	Away Arena	Overall record	Win %	Home	Away	Last Result
University of Michigan	Wolverines	Yost Ice Arena	14–22–1	.392	8–8–1	3–12–0	3-4 L
Michigan State University	Spartans	Munn Ice Arena	20–14–4	.579	11–4–3	9–10–1	1-2 L
University of Minnesota	Golden Gophers	3M Arena at Mariucci	16–21–1	.434	9–8–1	6–13–0	2-3 L
University of Notre Dame	Fighting Irish	Compton Family Ice Arena	7–17–3	.315	3–7–2	4–10–1	0-3 L
Ohio State University	Buckeyes	Value City Arena	15–21–4	.425	5–9–2	9–11–2	2-1 W
University of Wisconsin–Madison	Badgers	Kohl Center	24–18–3	.567	14–6–1	8–10–2	7-2 W

== Cumulative record against opponents ==
Prior to NCAA D1 Status

(1909–10, 1937–44, 1946–47, 1971–2012)

Opponent	PSU wins	PSU losses	Ties/OT losses^{❋}
Adrian College	1	0	0
Alabama-Huntsville	1	9	0
Arizona	17	8	1
Arizona State	13	1	0
Army	1	4	0
Binghamton	3	0	0
Bucknell	3	1	0
Buffalo State	32	7	2
Canisius	2	6	0
Canton Jr. College	2	1	0
Carleton	1	0	0
Carnegie Mellon	10	4	0
CC of Rhode Island	2	0	0
Central Oklahoma	2	0	0/2
Charleston	0	1	0
Colgate	0	1	0
Colorado	4	0	0
Colorado State	2	0	0
Conestoga	15	3	0
Cornell	0	1	0
Cortland State	4	5	0
Davenport	1	0	0
Delaware	81	17	3
Drexel	29	1	0
Duke	1	0	0
Duquesne	25	1	1/1
Eastern Michigan	34	9	2
Elmira College	0	5	0
Erie CC	25	10	4
Findlay	1	2	0
Fordham	1	0	0
Franklin and Marshall	3	0	0
Gannon College	3	0	0
Geneseo State	1	2	0
Georgetown	0	3	1
Hawthorne	1	0	0
Hobart	3	1	0
Holy Cross	0	1	0
Huntington	0	1	0
Illinois	24	7	1/1
Indiana	2	1	0
Iona	2	2	0
Iowa State	16	6	0
Ithaca College	0	2	0
Indiana Univ of Pennsylvania	5	0	0
John Carroll	0	1	0
Kent State	24	11	1
Lafayette	1	2	0
Lebanon Valley	1	0	0
Lehigh	9	6	1
Liberty	5	4	0/1
Lindenwood	2	0	0
MacDonald College	0	1	0
Marquette	3	0	0
Maryland	11	3	0
Massachusetts Boston	0	2	0
Mercyhurst	8	5	0
Miami (Ohio)	3	0	0
Michigan	2	0	0
Michigan State	6	0	0
Michigan-Dearborn	39	19	0
Minot State	3	0	0
Navy	36	4	1
Neumann	0	1	0
New Brunswick-St John	3	0	0
New Hampshire College	1	0	0
Niagara	21	12	4
Nichols	2	0	0
North Carolina State	2	0	0
North Dakota State	1	4	0
Northern Arizona	1	0	0
Notre Dame	0	3	1
Oakland	2	3	0

Opponent	PSU wins	PSU losses	Ties/OT losses^{❋}
Ohio	48	29	5/2
Oklahoma	4	1	0
Oswego State	0	1	0
Pennsylvania	5	4	0
Pittsburgh	15	5	1
Plymouth State	1	0	0
Princeton	0	3	0
Ramapo	3	0	0
Rhode Island	31	11	2/2
Robert Morris (Illinois)	4	0	0
Robert Morris (PA)	8	2	0
Rochester	12	0	1
Royal Military College	0	1	0
Rutgers	9	2	1
Saint Louis	1	0	0
Salem State	0	1	0
Salve Regina	1	0	0
Scranton	11	0	0
Seneca College	5	0	0
Skidmore	1	0	0
Slippery Rock	1	0	0
Southern New Hampshire	1	0	0
St Bonaventure	11	5	1
St Clair College	5	5	1
St John	3	1	0
St Joseph	1	0	0
SUNY-Brockport	1	1	0
SUNY-Canton	1	0	0
SUNY-Fredonia	2	3	0
Syracuse	1	0	0
Temple	2	0	0
Toledo	1	1	0
Towson	26	0	2
University of Buffalo	16	3	2
Upsala	13	0	0
Villanova	27	8	1
Washington and Jefferson	12	0	0
Wayne State	1	0	0
Weber State	1	0	0
West Chester	45	4	1/2
West Virginia	36	0	1
Western Michigan	3	0	0
Western New England	2	0	0
Westfield State	0	2	0
Wisconsin-Whitewater	2	2	0
Worcester Polytechnic	3	0	0
York University	0	1	0
Sub-total	935	300	42/11
Other:			
Army Air Corps	0	1	0
Bad Tolz Juniors	1	0	0
Bad Worishofen Seniors	0	1	0
Baltimore All-Stars	0	1	0
Baltimore Blazers	2	0	0
Dodge Junior A	1	0	0
Hampden Leafs	4	0	0
Harrisburg Mohawks	4	0	0
Hershey	2	0	0
Hershey Flyers	1	0	0
Hershey Jr. Bears	0	7	0
Junior Flyers	10	3	2
Junior Penguins	2	0	0
Kaufbeuren Juniors	0	0	1
Keene (NH) Blackhawks U20	1	0	0
Main Line Men	4	0	0
Navy All-Stars	0	1	0
North Penn Eagles	1	2	0
Pittsburgh Knights	0	4	0
Rutherford Sabres	1	0	0
Skateland Junior A	2	0	0
Washington All-Stars	0	1	0
unknown †	4	1	0
Sub-total	40	22	3/0
Total	975	322	45/11

^{❋} Beginning with the 2006–07 season, ties were abolished in favor of deciding overtime ties by the shootout. Overtime losses before the 2006–07 season are reported in the loss column.
† In 1972, 1980, and 1983–85, Penn State won 4 and lost 1 against opponents whose identities have not been retrieved.

== Coaches ==
On April 25, 2011, Penn State named Guy Gadowsky as the program's first NCAA Division I men's hockey coach. Gadowsky was previously the head coach of the Princeton Tigers from 2004 to 2011 and also served as head coach of the Alaska Nanooks from 1999 to 2004. He replaces Scott Balboni, who coached the Icers for five seasons from 2006 to 2011 and compiled a 150–35–8 record.

=== NCAA all-time coaching records ===
As of completion of 2024–25 season

Tenure	Coach	Years	Record	Pct.
1909–1910	No Coach	1	0–2–0	.000
1940–1944	Arthur Davis	4	13–10–1	.563
1946–1947	James O'Hora	1	0–3–0	.000
2012–present	Guy Gadowsky	12	231–200–31	.535
Totals	3 coaches	18 Seasons	244–215–33	.529

=== ACHA All-time coaching records ===
As of completion of 2011–12 season

Tenure	Coach	Years	Record	Pct.
2011–2012	Guy Gadowsky	1	29–4–1	.853
2006–2011	Scott Balboni	5	150–34–9	.797
1987–2006	Joe Battista	19	499–124–26	.788
1981–1987	Jon Shellington	6	125–71–8	.632
1977–1979,1980–1981	Clayton John	3	54–16–5	.753
1979–1980	Mark Horgas	1	18–5–0	.783
1976–1977	Bob Hettema	1	14–6–1	.690
1974–1976	Morris Kurtz	2	24–6–1	.790
1973–1974	Jim Hodgson	1	8–15–1	.354
1972–1973	multiple	1	10–11–0	.476
1971–1972	Larry Hendry	1	13–6–0	.684
Totals	11 coaches	40 seasons	944–298–52	.750

== Statistical leaders ==
=== Career points leaders ===
Player	Years	GP	G	A	Pts	PIM
Nate Sucese	2016–2020	147	61	79	140	68
David Goodwin	2013–2017	147	44	84	128	70
Alex Limoges	2017–2021	128	51	74	125	36
Chase Berger	2015–2019	154	51	67	118	34
Brandon Biro	2016–2020	138	41	75	116	49
Denis Smirnov	2016–2020	138	50	65	115	36
Andrew Sturtz	2015–2018	111	54	50	104	105
Liam Folkes	2016–2020	137	48	55	103	18
Evan Barratt	2017–2020	98	39	56	95	117
Kevin Wall	2019–2023	125	43	43	86	60

=== Career goaltending leaders ===
GP = Games played; Min = Minutes played; W = Wins; L = Losses; T = Ties; GA = Goals against; SO = Shutouts; SV% = Save percentage; GAA = Goals against average

minimum 30 games

Player	Years	GP	Min	W	L	T	GA	SO	SV%	GAA
Peyton Jones	2016–2020	133	7866	76	44	11	378	4	.907	2.88
Matt Skoff	2012–2016	77	4420	32	32	7	212	3	.909	2.88
Liam Soulière	2020–2024	84	4824	39	39	3	237	3	.897	2.95
Oskar Autio	2018–2022	49	2819	21	25	1	142	4	.897	3.02
Eamon McAdam	2013–2016	44	2420	18	21	2	132	1	.905	3.27

Statistics current through the end of the 2023–24 season.

== Players ==
=== Current roster ===
As of October 30, 2025.

No.	Nat.	Player	Class	Pos	Height	Weight	DoB	Hometown	Previous team	NHL rights
2	(United States)	Carter Schade	Senior	D	5' 11" (1.8 m)	185 lb (84 kg)	2003-03-07	Mars, Pennsylvania	Lincoln Stars (USHL)	—
3	(United States)	Casey Aman	Junior	D	6' 0" (1.83 m)	185 lb (84 kg)	2003-01-15	Johnstown, Pennsylvania	Powell River Kings (BCHL)	—
4	(United States)	Mac Gadowsky	Junior	D	6' 3" (1.91 m)	185 lb (84 kg)	2002-01-10	Fairbanks, Alaska	Army (AHA)	—
7	(Canada)	Jackson Smith	Freshman	D	6' 4" (1.93 m)	198 lb (90 kg)	2007-05-13	Calgary, Alberta	Tri-City Americans (WHL)	CBJ, 14th overall 2025
8	(United States)	Alex Servagno	Senior	F	5' 9" (1.75 m)	170 lb (77 kg)	2002-06-16	Gibsonia, Pennsylvania	Green Bay Gamblers (USHL)	—
9	(United States)	Keaton Peters	Sophomore	F	5' 10" (1.78 m)	187 lb (85 kg)	2004-05-01	Sussex, Wisconsin	Lincoln Stars (USHL)	—
10	(United States)	Nick Fascia	Sophomore	D	6' 1" (1.85 m)	183 lb (83 kg)	2005-04-28	Blackwood, New Jersey	Waterloo Black Hawks (USHL)	—
11	(Canada)	Luke Misa	Freshman	F	5' 10" (1.78 m)	180 lb (82 kg)	2005-11-25	Oakville, Ontario	Brampton Steelheads (OHL)	CGY, 150th overall 2024
12	(United States)	Ben Schoen	Senior (RS)	F	5' 8" (1.73 m)	150 lb (68 kg)	2002-05-18	Maumee, Ohio	Tri-City Storm (USHL)	—
14	(United States)	Matt DiMarsico	Junior	F	6' 0" (1.83 m)	180 lb (82 kg)	2004-01-07	Wexford, Pennsylvania	Green Bay Gamblers (USHL)	—
15	(United States)	Charlie Cerrato	Sophomore	F	6' 0" (1.83 m)	190 lb (86 kg)	2005-03-10	Fallston, Maryland	Youngstown Phantoms (USHL)	CAR, 49th overall 2025
18	(Canada)	Aiden Fink	Junior	F	5' 10" (1.78 m)	160 lb (73 kg)	2004-11-24	Calgary, Alberta	Brooks Bandits (AJHL)	NSH, 218th overall 2023
19	(United States)	Dane Dowiak	Junior	F	5' 10" (1.78 m)	180 lb (82 kg)	2002-03-27	Pittsburgh, Pennsylvania	Tri-City Storm (USHL)	—
21	(United States)	Braedon Ford	Sophomore	F	5' 9" (1.75 m)	168 lb (76 kg)	2004-01-19	Pittsburgh, Pennsylvania	Des Moines Buccaneers (USHL)	—
24	(United States)	Jarod Crespo	Senior	D	6' 0" (1.83 m)	190 lb (86 kg)	2002-04-30	Seven Lakes, North Carolina	Green Bay Gamblers (USHL)	—
27	(Canada)	Cade Christenson	Sophomore	D	6' 3" (1.91 m)	183 lb (83 kg)	2004-11-02	Edmonton, Alberta	Sherwood Park Crusaders (BCHL)	—
29	(United States)	Reese Laubach	Junior	F	6' 0" (1.83 m)	170 lb (77 kg)	2003-11-20	San Jose, California	Omaha Lancers (USHL)	SJS, 217th overall 2022
30	(United States)	Chris McFayden	Graduate	G	6' 3" (1.91 m)	215 lb (98 kg)	2002-07-19	Mars, Pennsylvania	Penn State Ice Lions (ACHA II)	—
33	(Canada)	Lev Katzin	Freshman	F	5' 8" (1.73 m)	176 lb (80 kg)	2007-05-13	Thornhill, Ontario	Guelph Storm (OHL)	—
34	(Canada)	Josh Fleming	Freshman	G	6' 2" (1.88 m)	172 lb (78 kg)	2004-11-10	Montréal, Quebec	Acadie-Bathurst Titan (QMJHL)	—
35	(Sweden)	Kevin Reidler	Sophomore	G	6' 6" (1.98 m)	203 lb (92 kg)	2004-09-02	Gävle, Sweden	Omaha (NCHC)	OTT, 151st overall 2022
71	(Canada)	Nic Chin-DeGraves	Sophomore	F	6' 0" (1.83 m)	172 lb (78 kg)	2003-05-19	Edmonton, Alberta	Brooks Bandits (BCHL)	—
72	(Canada)	Gavin McKenna	Freshman	F	6' 0" (1.83 m)	165 lb (75 kg)	2007-12-20	Whitehorse, Yukon	Medicine Hat Tigers (WHL)	—
77	(Canada)	Nolan Collins	Freshman	D	6' 4" (1.93 m)	216 lb (98 kg)	2004-04-28	Whitby, Ontario	Flint Firebirds (OHL)	PIT, 167th overall 2022
86	(United States)	J. J. Wiebusch	Sophomore	F	6' 0" (1.83 m)	172 lb (78 kg)	2004-02-20	River Falls, Wisconsin	Sioux Falls Stampede (USHL)	—
91	(United States)	Andrew Kuzma	Freshman (RS)	F	6' 0" (1.83 m)	194 lb (88 kg)	2005-01-29	New York, New York	Madison Capitols (USHL)	—
93	(Canada)	Shea Van Olm	Freshman	F	6' 1" (1.85 m)	198 lb (90 kg)	2004-03-05	Calgary, Alberta	Spokane Chiefs (WHL)	—

== Awards and honors ==
=== NCAA ===
==== Individual awards ====
Derek Hines Unsung Hero Award

- P. J. Musico: 2015

NCAA Scoring Champion

- Alex Limoges: 2019

==== All-Americans ====
AHCA Second Team All-Americans

- 2019–20: Cole Hults, D; Nate Sucese, F
- 2024–25: Aiden Fink, F

=== Big Ten ===
==== Individual awards ====
Defensive Player of the Year

- Trevor Hamilton: 2018

Freshman of the Year

- Gavin McKenna, F: 2026

Scoring Champion

- Gavin McKenna, F: 2026

Tournament Most Outstanding Player

- Peyton Jones: 2016

Coach of the Year

- Guy Gadowsky: 2015

==== All-Conference Teams ====
First Team All-Big Ten

- 2014–15: Casey Bailey, F
- 2016–17: Vince Pedrie, D
- 2017–18: Trevor Hamilton, D
- 2018–19: Evan Barratt, F
- 2024–25: Aiden Fink, F

Second Team All-Big Ten

- 2015–16: Eamon McAdam, G; Vince Pedrie, D
- 2024–25: Arsenii Sergeev, G; Simon Mack, D
- 2025–26: Gavin McKenna, F; Jackson Smith, D

Big Ten All-Rookie Team

- 2014–15: Scott Conway, F
- 2015–16: Vince Pedrie, D
- 2016–17: Peyton Jones, G; Kris Myllari, D; Denis Smirnov, D
- 2023–24: Aiden Fink, F
- 2024–25: Charlie Cerrato, F; Cade Christenson, D
- 2025–26: Gavin McKenna, F; Jackson Smith, D

== Nittany Lions in the NHL ==
As of June 1, 2025

Player	Position	Team(s)	Years	Games	Stanley Cups
Casey Bailey	Right Wing	TOR, OTT	2014–2017	13	0
Brandon Biro	Left Wing	BUF	2021–2024	6	0
Brett Murray	Left Wing	BUF	2020–Present	26	0

== See also ==
- Penn State Nittany Lions women's ice hockey
