= 2019–20 Wisconsin Badgers men's ice hockey season =

American college ice hockey season

- Conference: 7th Big Ten
- Home ice: Kohl Center

Rankings
- USCHO: NR
- USA Today: NR

Record
- Overall: 14–20–2
- Conference: 7–15–2–2
- Home: 10–8–0
- Road: 4–12–2
- Neutral: 0–0–0

Coaches and captains
- Head coach: Tony Granato
- Assistant coaches: Mark Strobel; Mark Osiecki; Brad Winchester
- Captain: Wyatt Kalynuk
- Alternate captain(s): Sean Dhooghe; Tarek Baker

The 2019–20 Wisconsin Badgers men's ice hockey season was the 71st season of play for the program and the 20th season in the Big Ten Conference. The Badgers represented the University of Wisconsin–Madison and were coached by Tony Granato, in his 4th season.

== Roster ==
As of August 16, 2019.

No.	Nat.	Player	Class	Pos	Height	Weight	DoB	Hometown	Previous team	NHL rights
1	(United States)	Jack Berry	Senior	G	6' 1" (1.85 m)	180 lb (82 kg)	1996-02-18	Holly, Michigan	New Jersey Titans (NAHL)	—
2	(Canada)	Wyatt Kalynuk (C)	Junior	F	6' 1" (1.85 m)	180 lb (82 kg)	1997-04-14	Virden, Manitoba	Bloomington Thunder (USHL)	PHI, 196th overall 2017
4	(Canada)	Dylan Holloway	Freshman	F	6' 1" (1.85 m)	192 lb (87 kg)	2001-09-23	Bragg Creek, Alberta	Okotoks Oilers (AJHL)	—
5	(United States)	Tyler Inamoto	Junior	D	6' 2" (1.88 m)	195 lb (88 kg)	1999-05-06	Barrington, Illinois	USNTDP (USHL)	FLA, 133rd overall 2017
7	(United States)	Mike Vorlicky	Freshman	D	6' 1" (1.85 m)	165 lb (75 kg)	2000-07-17	Edina, Minnesota	Edina High School (USHS–MN)	—
8	(United States)	Cole Caufield	Freshman	F	5' 7" (1.7 m)	163 lb (74 kg)	2001-01-02	Stevens Point, Wisconsin	USNTDP (USHL)	MTL, 15th overall 2019
9	(Sweden)	Linus Weissbach	Junior	F	5' 9" (1.75 m)	165 lb (75 kg)	1998-04-19	Gothenburg, Sweden	Tri-City Storm (USHL)	BUF, 192nd overall 2017
11	(United States)	Jack Gorniak	Sophomore	F	5' 11" (1.8 m)	177 lb (80 kg)	1999-09-15	West Salem, Wisconsin	West Salem High School (USHS–WI)	MTL, 123rd overall 2018
12	(United States)	Mick Messner	Sophomore	F	5' 11" (1.8 m)	199 lb (90 kg)	1999-04-20	Madison, Wisconsin	Madison Capitols (USHL)	—
13	(United States)	Roman Ahcan	Sophomore	F	5' 9" (1.75 m)	161 lb (73 kg)	1999-03-24	Savage, Minnesota	Cedar Rapids RoughRiders (USHL)	—
14	(Finland)	Jesper Peltonen	Sophomore	D	5' 10" (1.78 m)	181 lb (82 kg)	1998-06-08	Helsinki, Finland	Omaha Lancers (USHL)	—
15	(United States)	Alex Turcotte	Freshman	F	5' 11" (1.8 m)	185 lb (84 kg)	2001-02-26	Island Lake, Illinois	USNTDP (USHL)	LAK, 5th overall 2019
16	(United States)	Tarek Baker (A)	Junior	F	5' 10" (1.78 m)	185 lb (84 kg)	1997-02-22	Verona, Wisconsin	Sioux City Musketeers (USHL)	—
17	(United States)	Ty Pelton-Byce	Junior	F	6' 2" (1.88 m)	195 lb (88 kg)	1997-04-14	Madison, Wisconsin	Harvard (ECAC)	—
18	(United States)	Owen Lindmark	Freshman	F	6' 0" (1.83 m)	192 lb (87 kg)	2001-05-17	Naperville, Illinois	USNTDP (USHL)	FLA, 137th overall 2019
19	(United States)	K'Andre Miller	Sophomore	D	6' 4" (1.93 m)	205 lb (93 kg)	2000-01-21	Minnetonka, Minnesota	USNTDP (USHL)	NYR, 22nd overall 2018
20	(United States)	Josh Ess	Junior	D	5' 11" (1.8 m)	188 lb (85 kg)	1999-04-03	Lakeville, Minnesota	Lakeville South High School (USHS–MN)	CHI, 215th overall 2017
21	(United States)	Ty Emberson	Sophomore	D	6' 1" (1.85 m)	195 lb (88 kg)	2000-05-24	Eau Claire, Wisconsin	USNTDP (USHL)	ARI, 73rd overall 2018
22	(United States)	Max Zimmer	Senior	F	6' 0" (1.83 m)	190 lb (86 kg)	1997-10-29	Medina, Minnesota	Chicago Steel (USHL)	CAR, 104th overall 2016
23	(United States)	Jason Dhooghe	Junior	F	5' 7" (1.7 m)	165 lb (75 kg)	1997-03-15	Aurora, Illinois	Green Bay Gamblers (USHL)	—
24	(United States)	Sean Dhooghe (A)	Junior	F	5' 3" (1.6 m)	150 lb (68 kg)	1999-03-09	Aurora, Illinois	USNTDP (USHL)	—
25	(United States)	Dominick Mersch	Sophomore	F	6' 0" (1.83 m)	196 lb (89 kg)	1998-12-16	Park Ridge, Illinois	Lincoln Stars (USHL)	—
27	(United States)	Ryder Donovan	Freshman	F	6' 3" (1.91 m)	183 lb (83 kg)	2000-10-04	Duluth, Minnesota	East High School (USHS–MN)	VGK, 110th overall 2019
28	(United States)	Shay Donovan	Freshman	D	6' 3" (1.91 m)	194 lb (88 kg)	1998-05-26	Duluth, Minnesota	Wilkes-Barre/Scranton Knights (NAHL)	—
29	(United States)	Brock Caufield	Sophomore	F	5' 9" (1.75 m)	168 lb (76 kg)	1999-03-09	Stevens Point, Wisconsin	Green Bay Gamblers (USHL)	—
32	(Finland)	Daniel Lebedeff	Sophomore	G	6' 1" (1.85 m)	199 lb (90 kg)	1999-05-23	Helsinki, Finland	Janesville Jets (NAHL)	—
35	(Sweden)	Johan Blomquist	Senior	G	5' 11" (1.8 m)	180 lb (82 kg)	1995-09-17	Stockholm, Sweden	Connecticut Jr. Rangers (USPHL)	—

== Standings ==
2019–20 Big Ten ice hockey Standings
	Conference record								Overall record					
	GP	W	L	T	3/SW	PTS	GF	GA	GP	W	L	T	GF	GA
#9 Penn State	24	12	8	4	1	41	79	70	34	20	10	4	121	88
#10 Ohio State	24	11	9	4	1	38	62	62	34	18	11	5	91	80
#17 Michigan	24	11	10	3	2	38	65	52	34	16	14	4	92	72
#18 Minnesota	24	9	8	7	4	38	66	62	34	14	13	7	95	94
Notre Dame	24	9	9	6	4	37	59	59	34	14	13	7	90	91
Michigan State	24	11	11	2	0	35	54	54	34	15	17	2	80	82
Wisconsin	24	7	15	2	2	25	63	89	34	14	18	2	110	124
Championship: March 21, 2020 † indicates conference regular season champion * indicates conference tournament champion Rankings: USCHO.com Top 20 Poll; updated March 1, 2020

== Schedule and results ==
Date	Time	Opponent^{#}	Rank^{#}	Site	TV	Decision	Result	Attendance	Record
Regular Season
October 11	6:02 PM	at #10 Boston College*	#16	Conte Forum • Chestnut Hill, Massachusetts	NESN+	Lebedeff	L 3–5	6,172	0–1–0
October 12	8:07 PM	at Merrimack*	#16	J. Thom Lawler Rink • North Andover, Massachusetts		Lebedeff	W 11–5	2,106	1–1–0
October 18	7:02 PM	vs. #3 Minnesota–Duluth*	#17	Kohl Center • Madison, Wisconsin	FSN+	Lebedeff	W 6–2	10,410	2–1–0
October 19	7:02 PM	vs. #3 Minnesota–Duluth*	#17	Kohl Center • Madison, Wisconsin	FSN+	Lebedeff	W 3–1	13,296	3–1–0
October 25	7:02 PM	vs. #13 Clarkson*	#6	Kohl Center • Madison, Wisconsin	FSW	Lebedeff	L 0–4	7,811	3–2–0
October 26	7:07 PM	vs. #13 Clarkson*	#6	Kohl Center • Madison, Wisconsin		Lebedeff	W 4–3	9,672	4–2–0
October 31	7:01 PM	at #12 Penn State	#7	Pegula Ice Arena • University Park, Pennsylvania	BTN	Lebedeff	L 1–6	5,793	4–3–0 (0–1–0–0)
November 1	6:01 PM	at #12 Penn State	#7	Pegula Ice Arena • University Park, Pennsylvania	BTN	Lebedeff	L 2–4	5,980	4–4–0 (0–2–0–0)
November 8	7:07 PM	at #20 Omaha*	#12	Baxter Arena • Omaha, Nebraska		Lebedeff	W 5–2	5,605	5–4–0 (0–2–0–0)
November 9	7:07 PM	at #20 Omaha*	#12	Baxter Arena • Omaha, Nebraska		Lebedeff	L 2–5	6,411	5–5–0 (0–2–0–0)
November 15	7:02 PM	vs. #4 Notre Dame	#15	Kohl Center • Madison, Wisconsin	FSW	Lebedeff	W 3–0	9,698	6–5–0 (1–2–0–0)
November 16	7:05 PM	vs. #4 Notre Dame	#15	Kohl Center • Madison, Wisconsin		Lebedeff	L 4–5 ^{OT}	12,593	6–6–0 (1–3–0–0)
November 22	7:05 PM	at Minnesota	#16	3M Arena at Mariucci • Minneapolis, Minnesota	FSN, FSW	Lebedeff	L 1–4	7,903	6–7–0 (1–4–0–0)
November 23	7:05 PM	at Minnesota	#16	3M Arena at Mariucci • Minneapolis, Minnesota	FSN+, FSW+	Berry	T 3–3 ^{SOW}	8,612	6–7–1 (1–4–1–1)
November 30	7:02 PM	vs. Michigan	#19	Kohl Center • Madison, Wisconsin	FSW+	Lebedeff	W 3–2	9,894	7–7–1 (2–4–1–1)
December 1	4:01 PM	vs. Michigan	#19	Kohl Center • Madison, Wisconsin	BTN	Lebedeff	L 1–3	9,571	7–8–1 (2–5–1–1)
December 6	6:00 PM	at Michigan State	#19	Munn Ice Arena • East Lansing, Michigan		Lebedeff	L 0–3	6,007	7–9–1 (2–6–1–1)
December 7	6:00 PM	at Michigan State	#19	Munn Ice Arena • East Lansing, Michigan		Berry	L 4–5 ^{OT}	5,608	7–10–1 (2–7–1–1)
January 1	4:00 PM	at USNTDP*		USA Hockey Arena • Plymouth, Michigan (Exhibition)		Berry	W 3–2	1,270	
January 10	8:00 PM	vs. #8 Ohio State		Kohl Center • Madison, Wisconsin	ESPNU	Lebedeff	L 2–4	8,869	7–11–1 (2–8–1–1)
January 11	7:00 PM	vs. #8 Ohio State		Kohl Center • Madison, Wisconsin	FSW+	Berry	W 5–2	12,192	8–11–1 (3–8–1–1)
January 17	8:00 PM	vs. #20 Michigan State		Kohl Center • Madison, Wisconsin	ESPNU	Berry	L 0–4	9,336	8–12–1 (3–9–1–1)
January 18	7:00 PM	vs. #20 Michigan State		Kohl Center • Madison, Wisconsin	FSW+	Lebedeff	W 3–1	12,813	9–12–1 (4–9–1–1)
January 24	6:00 PM	at Notre Dame		Compton Family Ice Arena • Notre Dame, Indiana	NBC Sports Chi+	Berry	W 6–4	4,895	10–12–1 (5–9–1–1)
January 25	5:00 PM	at Notre Dame		Compton Family Ice Arena • Notre Dame, Indiana	NBC Sports Chi+	Berry	L 2–5	5,453	10–13–1 (5–10–1–1)
January 31	7:00 PM	vs. Minnesota		Kohl Center • Madison, Wisconsin	FSW+, FSN	Lebedeff	L 2–6	11,367	10–14–1 (5–11–1–1)
February 1	8:00 PM	vs. Minnesota		Kohl Center • Madison, Wisconsin	FSW, FSN+	Berry	L 2–4	13,506	10–15–1 (5–12–1–1)
February 7	5:00 PM	at Michigan		Yost Ice Arena • Ann Arbor, Michigan	BTN	Lebedeff	L 4–8	5,800	10–16–1 (5–13–1–1)
February 8	6:30 PM	at Michigan		Yost Ice Arena • Ann Arbor, Michigan		Lebedeff	L 3–5	5,800	10–17–1 (5–14–1–1)
February 14	7:00 PM	vs. #9 Penn State		Kohl Center • Madison, Wisconsin		Lebedeff	W 4–3	9,095	11–17–1 (6–14–1–1)
February 15	7:02 PM	vs. #9 Penn State		Kohl Center • Madison, Wisconsin	FSW	Lebedeff	L 2–3	13,054	11–18–1 (6–15–1–1)
February 21	7:00 PM	vs. #9 Arizona State*		Kohl Center • Madison, Wisconsin		Lebedeff	W 7–6	9,249	12–18–1 (6–15–1–1)
February 22	7:02 PM	vs. #9 Arizona State*		Kohl Center • Madison, Wisconsin		Lebedeff	W 6–2	12,856	13–18–1 (6–15–1–1)
February 28	5:00 PM	at #10 Ohio State		Value City Arena • Columbus, Ohio	BTN	Lebedeff	W 3–2	6,229	14–18–1 (7–15–1–1)
February 29	7:01 PM	at #10 Ohio State		Value City Arena • Columbus, Ohio	BTN	Berry	T 3–3 ^{3x3 OTW}	9,152	14–18–2 (7–15–2–2)
Big Ten Tournament
March 6	6:00 PM	at #11 Ohio State		Value City Arena • Columbus, Ohio (Quarterfinal Game 1)		Berry	L 1–9	1,694	14–19–2 (7–15–2–2)
March 7	6:00 PM	at #11 Ohio State		Value City Arena • Columbus, Ohio (Quarterfinal Game 2)		Berry	L 1–2 ^{OT}	2,626	14–20–2 (7–15–2–2)
Wisconsin Lost Series 0–2
*Non-conference game. ^{#}Rankings from USCHO.com Poll. All times are in Central Time.

== Scoring Statistics ==
Name	Position	Games	Goals	Assists	Points	PIM
Cole Caufield	C/RW	36	19	17	36	6
Wyatt Kalynuk	D	36	7	21	28	24
Alex Turcotte	C	29	9	17	26	20
Roman Achan	F	33	14	11	25	43
Ty Pelton-Byce	F	32	9	15	24	6
Linus Weissbach	W	35	4	18	22	25
K'Andre Miller	D	36	7	11	18	24
Dylan Holloway	F	35	8	9	17	49
Owen Lindmark	C	36	6	11	17	8
Sean Dhooghe	RW	28	5	9	14	39
Max Zimmer	LW	21	8	3	11	2
Tarek Baker	LW	36	4	6	10	26
Ty Emberson	D	33	1	8	9	53
Josh Ess	D	35	2	6	8	4
Jack Gorniak	C/LW	28	2	5	7	8
Tyler Inamoto	D	35	2	5	6	16
Ryder Donovan	C/RW	32	2	3	5	24
Mike Vorlicky	D	32	1	4	5	12
Brock Caufield	RW	31	1	2	3	0
Mick Messner	LW	23	1	2	2	12
Jack Berry	G	14	0	2	2	0
Dominick Mersch	F	30	0	2	2	10
Jesper Peltonen	D	7	0	1	1	0
Shay Donovan	D	2	0	0	0	0
Johan Blomqvist	G	3	0	0	0	0
Jason Dhooghe	F	3	0	0	0	0
Daniel Lebedeff	G	27	0	0	0	0
Total						

== Goaltending statistics ==
Name	Games	Minutes	Wins	Losses	Ties	Goals Against	Saves	Shut Outs	SV %	GAA
Jack Berry	14	647	2	6	2	38	285	0	.882	3.52
Daniel Lebedeff	27	1467	12	14	0	87	718	1	.892	3.56
Johan Blomqvist	3	43	0	0	0	5	20	0	.800	6.95
Empty Net	-	17	-	-	-	5	-	-	-	-
Total	36	2175	14	20	2	135	1023	1	.883	3.72

== Rankings ==
Poll	Week																							
Poll	Pre	1	2	3	4	5	6	7	8	9	10	11	12	13	14	15	16	17	18	19	20	21	22	23 (Final)
USCHO.com	16	16	17	6	7	12	15	16	19	19	NR	NR	NR	NR	NR	NR	NR	NR	NR	NR	NR	NR	NR	NR
USA Today	NR	15	NR	6	8	12	15	NR	NR	NR	NR	NR	NR	NR	NR	NR	NR	NR	NR	NR	NR	NR	NR	NR

== Players drafted into the NHL ==
=== 2020 NHL entry draft ===
Round	Pick	Player	NHL team
1	14	Dylan Holloway	Edmonton Oilers
4	97	Sam Strange†	Detroit Red Wings

† incoming freshman
