= 2019–20 Penn State Nittany Lions men's ice hockey season =

Big Ten, Champion
- Conference: 1st Big Ten
- Home ice: Pegula Ice Arena

Rankings
- USCHO: 8
- USA Today: 7

Record
- Overall: 20–10–4
- Conference: 12–8–4–1
- Home: 11–5–3
- Road: 9–5–1
- Neutral: 0–0–0

Coaches and captains
- Head coach: Guy Gadowsky
- Assistant coaches: Keith Fisher; Matt Lindsay; Andrew Magera
- Captain: Brandon Biro
- Alternate captain(s): Kris Myllari; Liam Folkes

The 2019–20 Penn State Nittany Lions men's ice hockey season was the 14th season of play for the program and the 7th season in the Big Ten Conference. The Nittany Lions represented Pennsylvania State University and were coached by Guy Gadowsky, in his 9th season.

On March 12, 2020, the Big Ten announced that the tournament was cancelled due to the coronavirus pandemic.

== Departures ==
Player	Position	Nationality	Cause
Chase Berger	Forward	United States	Graduation (Signed with Wilkes-Barre/Scranton Penguins)
Chris Funkey	Goaltender	United States	Graduation (Retired)
Derian Hamilton	Defenseman	Canada	Graduation (Signed with Norfolk Admirals)
Kevin Kerr	Defenseman	United States	Graduation (Retired)
Ludvig Larsson	Forward	Sweden	Graduation (Signed with Binghamton Devils)
Alec Marsh	Forward	United States	Graduation (Signed with Fayetteville Marksmen)

== Recruiting ==
Player	Position	Nationality	Age	Notes
Tyler Gratton	Forward	United States	20	Pottstown, PA
Bobby Hampton	Forward	United States	21	Middletown, NJ; transfer from Northeastern, red shirt
William Holforster	Goaltender	Canada	21	Mississauga, ON; previously played club hockey, did not play
Kenny Johnson	Defenseman	United States	21	Ann Arbor, MI
Connor MacEachern	Forward	Canada	20	Brooklin, ON
Connor McMenamin	Forward	United States	20	Collegeville, PA
Clayton Phillips	Defenseman	Canada	20	Edina, MN; transfer from Minnesota
Mason Snell	Defenseman	Canada	19	Clarington, ON
Kevin Wall	Forward	United States	19	Penfield, NY; selected 181st overall in 2019

== Roster ==
As of September 3, 2019.

No.	Nat.	Player	Class	Pos	Height	Weight	DoB	Hometown	Previous team	NHL rights
2	(United States)	Cole Hults	Junior	D	6' 2" (1.88 m)	195 lb (88 kg)	1998-05-22	Stoughton, Wisconsin	Madison Capitols (USHL)	LAK, 134th overall 2017
3	(United States)	Paul DeNaples	Sophomore	D	6' 0" (1.83 m)	184 lb (83 kg)	1998-09-19	Moscow, Pennsylvania	Sioux Falls Stampede (USHL)	—
4	(Canada)	Kris Myllari (A)	Senior	D	6' 2" (1.88 m)	200 lb (91 kg)	1997-02-05	Kanata, Ontario	Youngstown Phantoms (USHL)	—
6	(United States)	James Gobetz	Senior	D	6' 2" (1.88 m)	210 lb (95 kg)	1996-08-06	St. James, New York	Des Moines Buccaneers (USHL)	—
7	(United States)	Evan Bell	Junior	D	5' 11" (1.8 m)	191 lb (87 kg)	1997-06-25	Livonia, Michigan	Fargo Force (USHL)	—
9	(United States)	Alex Limoges	Junior	F	6' 1" (1.85 m)	200 lb (91 kg)	1997-09-16	Winchester, Virginia	Waterloo Black Hawks (USHL)	—
10	(Canada)	Brandon Biro (C)	Senior	F	5' 11" (1.8 m)	175 lb (79 kg)	1998-03-11	Sherwood Park, Alberta	Spruce Grove Saints (AJHL)	—
11	(United States)	Max Sauvé	Sophomore	F	5' 9" (1.75 m)	165 lb (75 kg)	1998-09-02	Acushnet, Massachusetts	Avon Old Farms (USHS–CT)	—
13	(Russia)	Nikita Pavlychev	Senior	F	6' 7" (2.01 m)	225 lb (102 kg)	1997-03-23	Yaroslavl, Russia	Des Moines Buccaneers (USHL)	PIT, 197th overall 2015
14	(United States)	Nate Sucese	Senior	F	5' 9" (1.75 m)	175 lb (79 kg)	1996-07-12	Fairport, New York	Dubuque Fighting Saints (USHL)	—
15	(United States)	Kenny Johnson	Freshman	D	6' 4" (1.93 m)	230 lb (104 kg)	1998-05-28	Ann Arbor, Michigan	Victoria Grizzlies (BCHL)	—
16	(Canada)	Mason Snell	Freshman	D	6' 0" (1.83 m)	190 lb (86 kg)	2000-06-18	Courtice, Ontario	Penticton Vees (BCHL)	—
17	(United States)	Evan Barratt	Junior	F	5' 11" (1.8 m)	190 lb (86 kg)	1999-02-18	Bristol, Pennsylvania	USNTDP (USHL)	CHI, 90th overall 2017
18	(United States)	Clayton Phillips	Junior	D	6' 0" (1.83 m)	195 lb (88 kg)	1999-09-09	Edina, Minnesota	Minnesota (Big Ten)	PIT, 93rd overall 2017
19	(United States)	Connor McMenamin	Freshman	F	5' 11" (1.8 m)	185 lb (84 kg)	1999-02-25	Collegeville, Pennsylvania	Tri-City Storm (USHL)	—
20	(Finland)	Aarne Talvitie	Sophomore	F	5' 10" (1.78 m)	198 lb (90 kg)	1999-02-11	Espoo, Finland	Espoo Blues U20 (Nuorten SM-liiga)	NJD, 160th overall 2017
21	(United States)	Kevin Wall	Freshman	F	6' 1" (1.85 m)	190 lb (86 kg)	2000-02-01	Penfield, New York	Chilliwack Chiefs (BCHL)	CAR, 181st overall 2019
22	(United States)	Alex Stevens	Junior	D	6' 1" (1.85 m)	200 lb (91 kg)	1997-02-27	Plymouth, Minnesota	Dubuque Fighting Saints (USHL)	—
23	(United States)	Blake Gober	Senior	F	5' 8" (1.73 m)	179 lb (81 kg)	1995-01-18	Colleyville, Texas	Bloomington Thunder (USHL)	—
24	(United States)	Adam Pilewicz	Junior	D	6' 1" (1.85 m)	180 lb (82 kg)	1996-07-20	Sewickley, Pennsylvania	Johnstown Tomahawks (NAHL)	—
25	(Russia)	Denis Smirnov	Senior	F	5' 10" (1.78 m)	180 lb (82 kg)	1997-08-12	Moscow, Russia	Fargo Force (USHL)	COL, 156th overall 2017
26	(Canada)	Liam Folkes (A)	Senior	F	5' 8" (1.73 m)	182 lb (83 kg)	1996-02-26	Scarborough, Ontario	Brockville Braves (CCHL)	—
27	(United States)	Sam Sternschein	Junior	F	6' 2" (1.88 m)	204 lb (93 kg)	1998-04-27	Syosset, New York	Lincoln Stars (USHL)	—
28	(United States)	Tyler Gratton	Freshman	F	6' 2" (1.88 m)	187 lb (85 kg)	1999-08-06	Pottstown, Pennsylvania	Central Illinois Flying Aces (USHL)	—
29	(Canada)	Connor MacEachern	Freshman	F	5' 10" (1.78 m)	175 lb (79 kg)	1999-07-01	Brooklin, Ontario	Youngstown Phantoms (USHL)	—
31	(United States)	Peyton Jones	Senior	G	6' 4" (1.93 m)	210 lb (95 kg)	1996-02-14	Langhorne, Pennsylvania	Lincoln Stars (USHL)	—
35	(Finland)	Oskar Autio	Sophomore	G	6' 0" (1.83 m)	183 lb (83 kg)	1999-10-06	Espoo, Finland	Chicago Steel (USHL)	—

== Standings ==
2019–20 Big Ten ice hockey Standings
	Conference record								Overall record					
	GP	W	L	T	3/SW	PTS	GF	GA	GP	W	L	T	GF	GA
#9 Penn State	24	12	8	4	1	41	79	70	34	20	10	4	121	88
#10 Ohio State	24	11	9	4	1	38	62	62	34	18	11	5	91	80
#17 Michigan	24	11	10	3	2	38	65	52	34	16	14	4	92	72
#18 Minnesota	24	9	8	7	4	38	66	62	34	14	13	7	95	94
Notre Dame	24	9	9	6	4	37	59	59	34	14	13	7	90	91
Michigan State	24	11	11	2	0	35	54	54	34	15	17	2	80	82
Wisconsin	24	7	15	2	2	25	63	89	34	14	18	2	110	124
Championship: March 21, 2020 † indicates conference regular season champion * indicates conference tournament champion Rankings: USCHO.com Top 20 Poll; updated March 1, 2020

== Schedule and results ==
Date	Time	Opponent^{#}	Rank^{#}	Site	TV	Decision	Result	Attendance	Record
Exhibition
October 6	1:07 PM	vs. Ottawa*	#13	Pegula Ice Arena • University Park, Pennsylvania (Exhibition)		Jones	W 5–0	1,236	
Regular season
October 11	7:07 PM	vs. Sacred Heart*	#13	Pegula Ice Arena • University Park, Pennsylvania		Jones	W 8–2	6,062	1–0–0
October 12	4:37 PM	vs. Sacred Heart*	#13	Pegula Ice Arena • University Park, Pennsylvania		Jones	W 5–4	6,111	2–0–0
October 18	7:30 PM	vs. Alaska*	#9	Pegula Ice Arena • University Park, Pennsylvania		Jones	W 7–0	5,898	3–0–0
October 19	7:07 PM	vs. Alaska*	#9	Pegula Ice Arena • University Park, Pennsylvania		Autio	L 0–4	6,146	3–1–0
October 25	7:07 PM	vs. Robert Morris*	#12	Pegula Ice Arena • University Park, Pennsylvania		Jones	W 2–1	5,799	4–1–0
October 31	7:01 PM	vs. #7 Wisconsin	#12	Pegula Ice Arena • University Park, Pennsylvania	BTN	Jones	W 6–1	5,793	5–1–0 (1–0–0–0)
November 1	6:01 PM	vs. #7 Wisconsin	#12	Pegula Ice Arena • University Park, Pennsylvania	BTN	Jones	W 4–2	5,980	6–1–0 (2–0–0–0)
November 8	7:07 PM	vs. Michigan State	#6	Pegula Ice Arena • University Park, Pennsylvania		Jones	L 0–2	6,071	6–2–0 (2–1–0–0)
November 9	6:07 PM	vs. Michigan State	#6	Pegula Ice Arena • University Park, Pennsylvania		Jones	W 6–4	5,936	7–2–0 (3–1–0–0)
November 15	8:05 PM	at Minnesota	#8	3M Arena at Mariucci • Minneapolis, Minnesota	FSN+	Jones	W 8–2	8,032	8–2–0 (4–1–0–0)
November 16	8:05 PM	at Minnesota	#8	3M Arena at Mariucci • Minneapolis, Minnesota	FSN+	Jones	W 6–3	8,203	9–2–0 (5–1–0–0)
November 22	7:07 PM	vs. #11 Ohio State	#6	Pegula Ice Arena • University Park, Pennsylvania		Jones	W 5–4	5,739	10–2–0 (6–1–0–0)
November 23	6:07 PM	vs. #11 Ohio State	#6	Pegula Ice Arena • University Park, Pennsylvania		Jones	L 3–4	5,213	10–3–0 (6–2–0–0)
November 29	7:00 PM	at Merrimack*	#7	J. Thom Lawler Rink • North Andover, Massachusetts		Autio	W 7–0	1,961	11–3–0 (6–2–0–0)
November 30	6:05 PM	at #15 Massachusetts–Lowell*	#7	Tsongas Center • Lowell, Massachusetts		Jones	L 2–3 ^{OT}	3,766	11–4–0 (6–2–0–0)
December 6	8:37 PM	at Michigan	#6	Yost Ice Arena • Ann Arbor, Michigan	FS1	Jones	L 1–4	5,246	11–5–0 (6–3–0–0)
December 7	7:31 PM	at Michigan	#6	Yost Ice Arena • Ann Arbor, Michigan		Jones	W 3–1	5,444	12–5–0 (7–3–0–0)
December 13	7:05 PM	at #15 Notre Dame	#7	Compton Family Ice Arena • Notre Dame, Indiana	NHL Network	Jones	W 4–2	3,806	13–5–0 (8–3–0–0)
December 14	6:05 PM	at #15 Notre Dame	#7	Compton Family Ice Arena • Notre Dame, Indiana		Jones	L 0–3	4,306	13–6–0 (8–4–0–0)
January 3	7:07 PM	vs. Niagara*	#8	Pegula Ice Arena • University Park, Pennsylvania		Jones	W 3–2	5,497	14–6–0 (8–4–0–0)
January 4	6:07 PM	vs. Niagara*	#8	Pegula Ice Arena • University Park, Pennsylvania		Autio	W 2–0	5,819	15–6–0 (8–4–0–0)
January 11	7:05 PM	vs. Robert Morris*	#6	Colonials Arena • Neville Township, Pennsylvania		Jones	W 6–2	3,312	16–6–0 (8–4–0–0)
January 17	7:00 PM	vs. Michigan	#6	Pegula Ice Arena • University Park, Pennsylvania		Jones	L 0–6	6,294	16–7–0 (8–5–0–0)
January 18	6:00 PM	vs. Michigan	#6	Pegula Ice Arena • University Park, Pennsylvania		Autio	T 4–4 ^{3x3 OTL}	6,278	16–7–1 (8–5–1–0)
January 24	7:00 PM	at #19 Michigan State	#9	Munn Ice Arena • East Lansing, Michigan		Jones	L 2–4	6,017	16–8–1 (8–6–1–0)
January 25	6:00 PM	at #19 Michigan State	#9	Munn Ice Arena • East Lansing, Michigan	BTN	Jones	W 2–1 ^{OT}	6,017	17–8–1 (9–6–1–0)
January 31	6:00 PM	vs. Notre Dame	#8	Pegula Ice Arena • University Park, Pennsylvania		Jones	T 3–3 ^{SOL}	6,226	17–8–2 (9–6–2–0)
February 1	6:00 PM	vs. Notre Dame	#8	Pegula Ice Arena • University Park, Pennsylvania		Jones	L 2–4	6,475	17–9–2 (9–7–2–0)
February 7	7:00 PM	at #13 Ohio State	#9	Value City Arena • Columbus, Ohio		Jones	T 2–2 ^{SOL}	7,704	17–9–3 (9–7–3–0)
February 8	5:00 PM	at #13 Ohio State	#9	Value City Arena • Columbus, Ohio		Jones	W 6–3	9,295	18–9–3 (10–7–3–0)
February 14	8:02 PM	at Wisconsin	#9	Kohl Center • Madison, Wisconsin		Jones	L 3–4	9,095	18–10–3 (10–8–3–0)
February 15	8:02 PM	at Wisconsin	#9	Kohl Center • Madison, Wisconsin	FSW	Jones	W 3–2	13,054	19–10–3 (11–8–3–0)
February 21	8:31 PM	vs. #18 Minnesota	#11	Pegula Ice Arena • University Park, Pennsylvania	BTN	Jones	T 3–3 ^{3x3 OTW}	6,151	19–10–4 (11–8–4–1)
February 22	6:31 PM	vs. #18 Minnesota	#11	Pegula Ice Arena • University Park, Pennsylvania	BTN	Jones	W 3–2	6,328	20–10–4 (12–8–4–1)
Big Ten Tournament
Tournament Cancelled
*Non-conference game. ^{#}Rankings from USCHO.com Poll. All times are in Eastern Time.

== Scoring Statistics ==
Name	Position	Games	Goals	Assists	Points	PIM
Nate Sucese	LW	34	11	27	38	16
Evan Barratt	C	34	12	22	34	28
Alex Limoges	C	30	11	21	32	8
Cole Hults	D	34	8	22	30	18
Liam Folkes	C	33	11	14	25	6
Brandon Biro	LW	25	10	15	25	8
Denis Smirnov	LW/RW	31	8	11	19	6
Aarne Talvitie	C/LW	30	6	13	19	2
Sam Sternschein	LW	29	12	5	17	10
Nikita Pavlychev	C	27	7	7	14	44
Connor McMenamin	LW	32	4	8	12	2
Paul DeNaples	D	34	3	8	11	4
Connor MacEachern	F	34	3	8	11	18
Kris Myllari	D	34	2	8	10	10
Clayton Phillips	D	27	2	7	9	20
Kevin Wall	RW	26	2	5	7	8
Evan Bell	D	25	1	6	7	8
Tyler Gratton	RW	31	3	3	6	24
Mason Snell	D	26	2	3	5	6
Alex Stevens	D	20	2	1	3	12
Max Sauvé	F	14	1	1	2	4
Peyton Jones	G	30	0	2	2	4
James Gobetz	D	26	0	1	1	8
Kenny Johnson	D	2	0	0	0	2
Adam Pilewicz	D	3	0	0	0	2
Blake Gober	F	5	0	0	0	0
Oskar Autio	G	5	0	0	0	0
Bench	-	-	-	-	-	2
Total			121	218	339	280

== Goaltending statistics ==
Name	Games	Minutes	Wins	Losses	Ties	Goals against	Saves	Shut outs	SV %	GAA
Oskar Autio	5	256	2	1	1	8	106	2	.930	1.87
Peyton Jones	30	1780	18	9	3	77	876	1	.919	2.60
Empty Net	-	27	-	-	-	3	-	-	-	-
Total	34	1063	20	10	4	88	982	3	.918	2.56

== Rankings ==
Poll	Week																							
Poll	Pre	1	2	3	4	5	6	7	8	9	10	11	12	13	14	15	16	17	18	19	20	21	22	23 (Final)
USCHO.com	13	13	9	12	12	6	8	6	7	6	7	8	8	6	6	9	8	9	9	11	9	8	8	8
USA Today	9	10	8	9	12	6	8	5	7	6	7	8	8	6	6	9	9	10	9	11	8	7	7	7

== 2020 NHL entry draft ==
Round	Pick	Player	NHL team
7	209	Chase McLane†	Nashville Predators

† incoming freshman
