= 2019–20 Minnesota Golden Gophers men's ice hockey season =

Mariucci Classic, Champion
- Conference: T–2nd Big Ten
- Home ice: 3M Arena at Mariucci

Rankings
- USCHO: NR
- USA Today: NR

Record
- Overall: 16–14–7
- Conference: 9–8–7–4
- Home: 10–9–3
- Road: 6–5–4
- Neutral: 0–0–0

Coaches and captains
- Head coach: Bob Motzko
- Assistant coaches: Garrett Raboin; Ben Gordon; Stu Bickel
- Captain(s): Tyler Nanne; Sammy Walker

The 2019–20 Minnesota Golden Gophers men's ice hockey season was the 99th season of play for the program. They represented the University of Minnesota in the 2019–20 NCAA Division I men's ice hockey season. This season marked the 30th season in the Big Ten Conference. They were coached by Bob Motzko, in his second season, and played their home games at 3M Arena at Mariucci.

On March 12, 2020, the Big Ten announced that the tournament was cancelled due to the coronavirus pandemic.

== Roster ==
As of September 14, 2019.

No.	Nat.	Player	Class	Pos	Height	Weight	DoB	Hometown	Previous team	NHL rights
1	(Canada)	Justen Close	Freshman	G	5' 10" (1.78 m)	175 lb (79 kg)	1998-05-20	Kindersley, Saskatchewan	Kindersley Klippers (SJHL)	—
2	(United States)	Tyler Nanne (C)	Senior	D	5' 11" (1.8 m)	185 lb (84 kg)	1996-03-17	Edina, Minnesota	Ohio State (Big Ten)	NYR, 142nd overall 2014
3	(United States)	Robbie Stucker	Sophomore	D	6' 3" (1.91 m)	185 lb (84 kg)	1998-09-30	St. Paul, Minnesota	Fargo Force (USHL)	CBJ, 210th overall 2017
4	(United States)	Ben Brinkman	Sophomore	D	6' 1" (1.85 m)	215 lb (98 kg)	2000-10-04	Edina, Minnesota	Edina High School (USHS–MN)	DAL, 173rd overall 2019
5	(United States)	Matt Denman	Sophomore	D	6' 0" (1.83 m)	190 lb (86 kg)	1998-04-20	Prior Lake, Minnesota	Cedar Rapids RoughRiders (USHL)	—
7	(United States)	Brannon McManus	Junior	F	5' 11" (1.8 m)	195 lb (88 kg)	1999-07-05	Newport Beach, California	Chicago Steel (USHL)	—
9	(United States)	Sammy Walker (C)	Sophomore	F	5' 11" (1.8 m)	170 lb (77 kg)	1999-06-07	Edina, Minnesota	Edina High School (USHS–MN)	TBL, 200th overall 2017
10	(United States)	Jackson LaCombe	Freshman	D	6' 2" (1.88 m)	190 lb (86 kg)	2001-01-09	Eden Prairie, Minnesota	Shattuck-Saint Mary's (Midget AAA)	ANA, 39th overall 2019
11	(United States)	Jonny Sorenson	Freshman	F	6' 0" (1.83 m)	175 lb (79 kg)	1999-09-21	St. Louis Park, Minnesota	Fairbanks Ice Dogs (NAHL)	—
12	(United States)	Joey Marooney	Senior	F	5' 9" (1.75 m)	170 lb (77 kg)	1996-02-18	Chaska, Minnesota	Green Bay Gamblers (USHL)	—
13	(United States)	Cullen Munson	Junior	F	5' 11" (1.8 m)	185 lb (84 kg)	1996-04-04	Edina, Minnesota	Janesville Jets (NAHL)	—
17	(United States)	Garrett Wait	Sophomore	F	6' 0" (1.83 m)	200 lb (91 kg)	1998-06-13	Edina, Minnesota	Waterloo Black Hawks (USHL)	—
19	(United States)	Scott Reedy	Junior	F	6' 2" (1.88 m)	205 lb (93 kg)	1999-04-04	Prior Lake, Minnesota	USNTDP (USHL)	SJS, 102nd overall 2017
20	(United States)	Ryan Zuhlsdorf	Senior	D	6' 0" (1.83 m)	200 lb (91 kg)	1997-07-01	Edina, Minnesota	Dubuque (USHL)	TBL, 150th overall 2015
21	(United States)	Nathan Burke	Sophomore	F	6' 1" (1.85 m)	190 lb (86 kg)	1998-12-21	Scottsdale, Arizona	Aberdeen Wings (NAHL)	—
22	(United States)	Bryce Brodzinski	Freshman	F	6' 0" (1.83 m)	215 lb (98 kg)	2000-08-09	Blaine, Minnesota	Blaine High School (USHS–MN)	PHI, 196th overall 2019
23	(United States)	Ryan Johnson	Freshman	D	6' 1" (1.85 m)	175 lb (79 kg)	2001-07-24	Irvine, California	Sioux Falls Stampede (USHL)	BUF, 31st overall 2019
24	(United States)	Jaxon Nelson	Freshman	F	6' 4" (1.93 m)	220 lb (100 kg)	2000-03-30	Magnolia, Minnesota	Omaha Lancers (USHL)	—
25	(United States)	Jack Perbix	Freshman	F	6' 1" (1.85 m)	185 lb (84 kg)	2000-09-13	Elk River, Minnesota	Des Moines Buccaneers (USHL)	ANA, 116th overall 2018
27	(United States)	Blake McLaughlin	Sophomore	F	6' 0" (1.83 m)	175 lb (79 kg)	2000-02-14	Grand Rapids, Minnesota	Chicago Steel (USHL)	ANA, 79th overall 2018
28	(United States)	Sam Rossini	Junior	D	6' 4" (1.93 m)	200 lb (91 kg)	1998-06-19	Burnsville, Minnesota	Penticton Vees (BCHL)	—
31	(United States)	Jared Moe	Freshman	G	6' 4" (1.93 m)	210 lb (95 kg)	1999-07-22	New Prague, Minnesota	Waterloo Black Hawks (USHL)	WPG, 184th overall 2017
39	(United States)	Ben Meyers	Freshman	F	5' 11" (1.8 m)	200 lb (91 kg)	1998-11-15	Delano, Minnesota	Fargo Force (USHL)	—
45	(Canada)	Jack LaFontaine	Junior	G	6' 3" (1.91 m)	200 lb (91 kg)	1998-01-06	Mississauga, Ontario	Penticton Vees (BCHL)	CAR, 75th overall 2016
51	(United States)	Noah Weber	Freshman	F	6' 0" (1.83 m)	205 lb (93 kg)	1998-02-15	Eagle River, Wisconsin	Madison Capitols (USHL)	—
55	(United States)	Matt Staudacher	Freshman	D	6' 1" (1.85 m)	195 lb (88 kg)	2000-02-07	Fenton, Michigan	Muskegon Lumberjacks (USHL)	—
58	(Finland)	Sampo Ranta	Sophomore	F	6' 2" (1.88 m)	205 lb (93 kg)	2000-05-31	Naantali, Finland	Sioux City Musketeers (USHL)	COL, 78th overall 2018

== Standings ==
2019–20 Big Ten ice hockey Standings
	Conference record								Overall record					
	GP	W	L	T	3/SW	PTS	GF	GA	GP	W	L	T	GF	GA
#9 Penn State	24	12	8	4	1	41	79	70	34	20	10	4	121	88
#10 Ohio State	24	11	9	4	1	38	62	62	34	18	11	5	91	80
#17 Michigan	24	11	10	3	2	38	65	52	34	16	14	4	92	72
#18 Minnesota	24	9	8	7	4	38	66	62	34	14	13	7	95	94
Notre Dame	24	9	9	6	4	37	59	59	34	14	13	7	90	91
Michigan State	24	11	11	2	0	35	54	54	34	15	17	2	80	82
Wisconsin	24	7	15	2	2	25	63	89	34	14	18	2	110	124
Championship: March 21, 2020 † indicates conference regular season champion * indicates conference tournament champion Rankings: USCHO.com Top 20 Poll; updated March 1, 2020

== Schedule and results ==
Date	Time	Opponent^{#}	Rank^{#}	Site	TV	Decision	Result	Attendance	Record
Exhibition
October 7	5:00 PM	vs. Mount Royal*		3M Arena at Mariucci • Minneapolis, Minnesota (Exhibition)		Close	T 2–2 ^{OT}	6,482	
Regular season
October 11	8:37 PM	at Colorado College*		Broadmoor World Arena • Colorado Springs, Colorado	FSN+	LaFontaine	L 2–3	3,429	0–1–0
October 12	8:07 PM	at Colorado College*		Broadmoor World Arena • Colorado Springs, Colorado		Moe	W 4–3	3,460	1–1–0
October 18	7:05 PM	vs. Niagara*		3M Arena at Mariucci • Minneapolis, Minnesota	FSN	LaFontaine	W 3–2 ^{OT}	7,294	2–1–0
October 19	7:05 PM	vs. Niagara*		3M Arena at Mariucci • Minneapolis, Minnesota	FSN	Moe	W 4–2	7,802	3–1–0
October 25	7:05 PM	vs. #8 Minnesota–Duluth*	#20	3M Arena at Mariucci • Minneapolis, Minnesota	FSN+	LaFontaine	L 2–5	9,407	3–2–0
October 26	8:07 PM	at #8 Minnesota–Duluth*	#20	AMSOIL Arena • Duluth, Minnesota		Moe	L 0–2	6,655	3–3–0
November 1	7:33 PM	vs. #5 Notre Dame		3M Arena at Mariucci • Minneapolis, Minnesota	BTN	Moe	T 2–2 ^{3x3 OTW}	7,459	3–3–1 (0–0–1–1)
November 2	4:04 PM	vs. #5 Notre Dame		3M Arena at Mariucci • Minneapolis, Minnesota	FSN	Moe	L 3–5	8,008	3–4–1 (0–1–1–1)
November 8	5:31 PM	at Michigan		Yost Ice Arena • Ann Arbor, Michigan (Rivalry)	BTN	LaFontaine	T 1–1 ^{3x3 OTW}	5,373	3–4–2 (0–1–2–2)
November 9	4:01 PM	at Michigan		Yost Ice Arena • Ann Arbor, Michigan (Rivalry)	BTN	Moe	W 3–1	5,800	4–4–2 (1–1–2–2)
November 15	7:05 PM	vs. #8 Penn State		3M Arena at Mariucci • Minneapolis, Minnesota	FSN+	LaFontaine	L 2–8	8,032	4–5–2 (1–2–2–2)
November 16	7:05 PM	vs. #8 Penn State		3M Arena at Mariucci • Minneapolis, Minnesota	FSN+	Moe	L 3–6	8,203	4–6–2 (1–3–2–2)
November 22	7:05 PM	vs. #16 Wisconsin		3M Arena at Mariucci • Minneapolis, Minnesota	FSN, FSW	LaFontaine	W 4–1	7,903	5–6–2 (2–3–2–2)
November 23	7:05 PM	vs. #16 Wisconsin		3M Arena at Mariucci • Minneapolis, Minnesota	FSN+, FSW+	LaFontaine	T 3–3 ^{SOL}	8,612	5–6–3 (2–3–3–2)
November 28	7:05 PM	vs. #3 North Dakota*		3M Arena at Mariucci • Minneapolis, Minnesota	FSN	LaFontaine	L 3–9	8,567	5–7–3 (2–3–3–2)
December 1	7:05 PM	vs. #3 North Dakota*		3M Arena at Mariucci • Minneapolis, Minnesota	FSN	Moe	L 2–3	9,823	5–8–3 (2–3–3–2)
December 6	7:01 PM	at #7 Ohio State		Value City Arena • Columbus, Ohio	BTN	LaFontaine	L 2–3 ^{OT}	5,321	5–9–3 (2–4–3–2)
December 7	7:00 PM	at #7 Ohio State		Value City Arena • Columbus, Ohio		LaFontaine	T 1–1 ^{3x3 OTW}	3,816	5–9–4 (2–4–4–3)
Mariucci Classic
December 28	7:00 PM	vs. Bemidji State*		3M Arena at Mariucci • Minneapolis, Minnesota (Mariucci Semifinal)	FSN+	LaFontaine	W 5–2	7,615	6–9–4 (2–4–4–3)
December 29	7:05 PM	vs. St. Cloud State*		3M Arena at Mariucci • Minneapolis, Minnesota (Mariucci Championship)	FSN+	LaFontaine	W 4–1	6,772	7–9–4 (2–4–4–3)
Regular season
January 10	5:00 PM	at #20 Michigan State		Munn Ice Arena • East Lansing, Michigan	BTN	LaFontaine	L 1–4	6,346	7–10–4 (2–5–4–3)
January 11	6:00 PM	at #20 Michigan State		Munn Ice Arena • East Lansing, Michigan	BTN	Moe	W 2–0	5,923	8–10–4 (3–5–4–3)
January 17	7:00 PM	vs. USNTDP*		3M Arena at Mariucci • Minneapolis, Minnesota (Exhibition)		Close	L 1–2	6,138	
January 24	7:00 PM	vs. #6 Ohio State		3M Arena at Mariucci • Minneapolis, Minnesota	FSN+	LaFontaine	W 6–3	7,489	9–10–4 (4–5–4–3)
January 25	7:30 PM	vs. #6 Ohio State		3M Arena at Mariucci • Minneapolis, Minnesota	BTN	LaFontaine	W 4–1	8,426	10–10–4 (5–5–4–3)
January 31	7:02 PM	at Wisconsin		Kohl Center • Madison, Wisconsin	FSN, FSW+	Moe	W 6–2	11,637	11–10–4 (6–5–4–3)
February 1	8:02 PM	at Wisconsin		Kohl Center • Madison, Wisconsin	FSN+, FSW	Moe	W 4–2	13,506	12–10–4 (7–5–4–3)
February 7	7:00 PM	vs. #19 Michigan State		3M Arena at Mariucci • Minneapolis, Minnesota	FSN+	Moe	W 4–1	8,860	13–10–4 (8–5–4–3)
February 8	5:05 PM	vs. #19 Michigan State		3M Arena at Mariucci • Minneapolis, Minnesota	FSN+	Moe	L 2–4	9,661	13–11–4 (8–6–4–3)
February 14	6:10 PM	at Notre Dame		Compton Family Ice Arena • Notre Dame, Indiana	NBCSN	LaFontaine	T 3–3 ^{SOW}	4,854	13–11–5 (8–6–5–4)
February 15	5:05 PM	at Notre Dame		Compton Family Ice Arena • Notre Dame, Indiana	NBC Sports Chi+	LaFontaine	W 2–1	5,804	14–11–5 (9–6–5–4)
February 21	7:30 PM	at #11 Penn State	#18	Pegula Ice Arena • University Park, Pennsylvania	BTN	LaFontaine	T 3–3 ^{3x3 OTL}	6,151	14–11–6 (9–6–6–4)
February 22	5:30 PM	at #11 Penn State	#18	Pegula Ice Arena • University Park, Pennsylvania	BTN	LaFontaine	L 2–3	6,328	14–12–6 (9–7–6–4)
February 28	7:30 PM	vs. Michigan	#18	3M Arena at Mariucci • Minneapolis, Minnesota (Rivalry)	BTN	LaFontaine	T 2–2 ^{SOL}	8,149	14–12–7 (9–7–7–4)
February 29	5:00 PM	vs. Michigan	#18	3M Arena at Mariucci • Minneapolis, Minnesota (Rivalry)	FSN	LaFontaine	L 1–2	9,613	14–13–7 (9–8–7–4)
Big Ten Tournament
March 6	7:01 PM	vs. Notre Dame*	#19	3M Arena at Mariucci • Minneapolis, Minnesota (Quarterfinal Game 1)		LaFontaine	L 0–1	2,012	14–14–7 (9–8–7–4)
March 7	7:01 PM	vs. Notre Dame*	#19	3M Arena at Mariucci • Minneapolis, Minnesota (Quarterfinal Game 2)		LaFontaine	W 2–1	2,281	15–14–7 (9–8–7–4)
March 8	6:01 PM	vs. Notre Dame*	#19	3M Arena at Mariucci • Minneapolis, Minnesota (Quarterfinal Game 3)		LaFontaine	W 3–2	2,039	16–14–7 (9–8–7–4)
Minnesota Won Series 2–1
Remainder of Tournament Cancelled
*Non-conference game. ^{#}Rankings from USCHO.com Poll. All times are in Central Time. Source:

== Scoring statistics ==
Name	Position	Games	Goals	Assists	Points	PIM
Sammy Walker	C	37	11	19	30	33
Brannon McManus	C/RW	37	9	18	27	10
Ben Meyers	C/LW	37	10	16	26	8
Blake McLaughlin	LW	37	8	16	24	34
Scott Reedy	C	35	15	8	23	12
Sampo Ranta	LW	35	12	8	20	10
Tyler Nanne	D	35	4	10	14	2
Jackson LaCombe	D	37	3	10	13	14
Bryce Brodzinski	RW	37	7	5	12	16
Jonny Sorenson	F	35	6	5	11	10
Ryan Zuhlsdorf	D	37	1	8	9	8
Robbie Stucker	D	35	2	6	8	4
Ryan Johnson	D	37	0	8	8	20
Gerrett Wait	LW	21	2	5	7	0
Jack Perbix	RW	35	2	5	7	16
Nathan Burke	F	32	3	3	6	2
Jaxon Nelson	C	33	2	4	6	2
Matt Staudacher	D	37	1	5	6	29
Joey Marooney	RW	20	0	4	4	8
Ben Brinkman	D	36	0	3	3	8
Cullen Munson	C	16	2	0	2	2
Sam Rossini	D	2	0	0	0	10
Justen Close	G	3	0	0	0	0
Jared Moe	G	16	0	0	0	0
Jack LaFontaine	G	25	0	0	0	0
Bench	-	-	-	-	-	10
Total			100	166	266	258

== Goaltending statistics ==
Name	Games	Minutes	Wins	Losses	Ties	Goals against	Saves	Shut outs	SV %	GAA
Jared Moe	16	829	7	5	1	34	366	1	.915	2.46
Jack LaFontaine	25	1389	9	9	6	59	671	0	.919	2.55
Justen Close	3	29	0	0	0	3	11	0	.786	6.09
Empty Net	-	11	-	-	-	2	-	-	-	-
Total	37	2260	16	14	7	98	1048	1	.914	2.60

== Rankings ==
Poll	Week																							
Poll	Pre	1	2	3	4	5	6	7	8	9	10	11	12	13	14	15	16	17	18	19	20	21	22	23 (Final)
USCHO.com	NR	NR	NR	20	NR	NR	NR	NR	NR	NR	NR	NR	NR	NR	NR	NR	NR	NR	NR	18	18	19	18	18
USA Today	NR	NR	NR	NR	NR	NR	NR	NR	NR	NR	NR	NR	NR	NR	NR	NR	NR	NR	NR	NR	NR	NR	NR	NR

== Players drafted into the NHL ==
=== 2020 NHL entry draft ===
Round	Pick	Player	NHL team
2	45	Brock Faber†	Los Angeles Kings
3	80	Jake Boltmann†	Calgary Flames
6	180	Joe Miller†	Toronto Maple Leafs

† incoming freshman
