= 2019–20 Notre Dame Fighting Irish men's ice hockey season =

- Conference: 5th Big Ten
- Home ice: Compton Family Ice Arena

Rankings
- USCHO: NR
- USA Today: NR

Record
- Overall: 15–15–7
- Conference: 9–9–6–4
- Home: 8–8–3
- Road: 7–7–4
- Neutral: 0–0–0

Coaches and captains
- Head coach: Jeff Jackson
- Assistant coaches: Paul Pooley; Andy Slaggert; Kyle Lawson
- Captain: Cal Burke
- Alternate captain(s): Tory Dello; Cale Morris

The 2019–20 Notre Dame Fighting Irish men's ice hockey season was the 60th season of play for the program and the 3rd season in the Big Ten Conference. The Fighting Irish represented the University of Notre Dame and were coached by Jeff Jackson, in his 15th season.

== Roster ==
As of September 12, 2019.

| No. | Nat. | Player | Class | Pos | Height | Weight | DoB | Hometown | Previous team | NHL rights |
|---|---|---|---|---|---|---|---|---|---|---|
| 1 | (United States) | Dylan St. Cyr | Junior | G | 5' 8" (1.73 m) | 189 lb (86 kg) | 1999-05-23 | Northville, Michigan | USNTDP (USHL) | — |
| 2 | (United States) | Nate Clurman | Sophomore | D | 6' 2" (1.88 m) | 207 lb (94 kg) | 1998-05-08 | Boulder, Colorado | Langley Rivermen (BCHL) | — |
| 3 | (United States) | Ryan Carmichael | Freshman | D | 6' 2" (1.88 m) | 191 lb (87 kg) | 1999-03-03 | Greenwich, Connecticut | Lincoln Stars (USHL) | — |
| 4 | (United States) | Nick Leivermann | Sophomore | D | 5' 11" (1.8 m) | 184 lb (83 kg) | 1998-09-14 | Eden Prairie, Minnesota | Penticton Vees (BCHL) | COL, 187th overall 2017 |
| 5 | (United States) | Matt Hellickson | Junior | D | 6' 1" (1.85 m) | 192 lb (87 kg) | 1998-03-21 | Rogers, Minnesota | Sioux City Musketeers (USHL) | NJD, 214th overall 2017 |
| 6 | (United States) | Tory Dello (A) | Senior | D | 6' 0" (1.83 m) | 199 lb (90 kg) | 1997-02-14 | Crystal Lake, Illinois | Tri-City Storm (USHL) | — |
| 8 | (United States) | Matt Steeves | Junior | F | 6' 0" (1.83 m) | 203 lb (92 kg) | 1997-10-04 | Bedford, New Hampshire | Muskegon Lumberjacks (USHL) | — |
| 10 | (United States) | Cam Burke | Sophomore | F | 5' 8" (1.73 m) | 170 lb (77 kg) | 1999-01-08 | Boxborough, Massachusetts | Sioux Falls Stampede (USHL) | — |
| 11 | (United States) | Cal Burke (C) | Senior | F | 5' 10" (1.78 m) | 184 lb (83 kg) | 1997-03-19 | Boxborough, Massachusetts | Cedar Rapids RoughRiders (USHL) | — |
| 13 | (United States) | Colin Theisen | Junior | F | 6' 0" (1.83 m) | 194 lb (88 kg) | 1997-04-24 | Monroe, Michigan | Dubuque Fighting Saints (USHL) | — |
| 14 | (Canada) | Jesse Lansdell | Freshman | F | 5' 11" (1.8 m) | 185 lb (84 kg) | 1998-08-05 | Surrey, British Columbia | Vernon Vipers (BCHL) | — |
| 15 | (United States) | Michael Graham | Sophomore | F | 6' 1" (1.85 m) | 198 lb (90 kg) | 1997-11-27 | Eden Prairie, Minnesota | Muskegon Lumberjacks (USHL) | — |
| 16 | (United States) | Alex Steeves | Sophomore | F | 5' 10" (1.78 m) | 188 lb (85 kg) | 1999-12-10 | Bedford, New Hampshire | Dubuque Fighting Saints (USHL) | — |
| 17 | (United States) | Pierce Crawford | Junior | F | 5' 9" (1.75 m) | 185 lb (84 kg) | 1997-06-23 | Park Ridge, Illinois | Youngstown Phantoms (USHL) | — |
| 18 | (United States) | Graham Slaggert | Sophomore | F | 6' 0" (1.83 m) | 187 lb (85 kg) | 1999-04-06 | South Bend, Indiana | Cedar Rapids RoughRiders (USHL) | — |
| 19 | (United States) | Mike O'Leary | Senior | F | 6' 1" (1.85 m) | 200 lb (91 kg) | 1998-01-01 | Halifax, Nova Scotia | Dubuque Fighting Saints (USHL) | — |
| 20 | (United States) | Jake Pivonka | Sophomore | F | 6' 0" (1.83 m) | 205 lb (93 kg) | 2000-02-28 | Naperville, Illinois | USNTDP (USHL) | NYI, 103rd overall 2018 |
| 21 | (United States) | Max Ellis | Freshman | F | 5' 9" (1.75 m) | 151 lb (68 kg) | 2000-01-18 | Plymouth, Michigan | Muskegon Lumberjacks (USHL) | — |
| 22 | (United States) | Jack MacNab | Freshman | F | 6' 0" (1.83 m) | 202 lb (92 kg) | 1998-07-03 | Indianapolis, Indiana | Central Illinois Flying Aces (USHL) | — |
| 24 | (United States) | Spencer Stastney | Sophomore | D | 5' 11" (1.8 m) | 189 lb (86 kg) | 2000-01-04 | Mequon, Wisconsin | USNTDP (USHL) | NSH, 131st overall 2018 |
| 25 | (United States) | Solag Bakich | Freshman | F | 6' 0" (1.83 m) | 194 lb (88 kg) | 1998-01-08 | Dallas, Texas | Waterloo Black Hawks (USHL) | — |
| 26 | (Canada) | Cam Morrison | Senior | F | 6' 3" (1.91 m) | 214 lb (97 kg) | 1998-08-27 | Aurora, Ontario | Youngstown Phantoms (USHL) | COL, 40th overall 2016 |
| 27 | (United States) | Trevor Janicke | Freshman | F | 5' 10" (1.78 m) | 191 lb (87 kg) | 2000-12-25 | Maple Grove, Minnesota | Central Illinois Flying Aces (USHL) | ANA, 132nd overall 2019 |
| 28 | (United States) | Christian DiCesare | Freshman | D | 6' 1" (1.85 m) | 205 lb (93 kg) | 1998-03-28 | Morristown, New Jersey | Omaha Lancers (USHL) | — |
| 29 | (United States) | Charlie Raith | Sophomore | D | 5' 9" (1.75 m) | 174 lb (79 kg) | 1997-04-30 | Winnetka, Illinois | Central Illinois Flying Aces (USHL) | — |
| 30 | (United States) | Ryan Bischel | Freshman | G | 6' 1" (1.85 m) | 189 lb (86 kg) | 1999-07-05 | Medina, Minnesota | Fargo Force (USHL) | — |
| 32 | (United States) | Cale Morris (A) | Senior | G | 6' 1" (1.85 m) | 195 lb (88 kg) | 1996-05-22 | Larkspur, Colorado | Waterloo Black Hawks (USHL) | — |
| 33 | (United States) | Nick Sanford | Junior | G | 6' 1" (1.85 m) | 192 lb (87 kg) | 1996-12-15 | Morristown, New Jersey | Boston Junior Bruins (USPHL) | — |

== Standings ==
2019–20 Big Ten ice hockey Standings
| | Conference record | | | | | | | | Overall record | | | | | |
| | GP | W | L | T | 3/SW | PTS | GF | GA | GP | W | L | T | GF | GA |
|---|---|---|---|---|---|---|---|---|---|---|---|---|---|---|
| #9 Penn State | 24 | 12 | 8 | 4 | 1 | 41 | 79 | 70 | 34 | 20 | 10 | 4 | 121 | 88 |
| #10 Ohio State | 24 | 11 | 9 | 4 | 1 | 38 | 62 | 62 | 34 | 18 | 11 | 5 | 91 | 80 |
| #17 Michigan | 24 | 11 | 10 | 3 | 2 | 38 | 65 | 52 | 34 | 16 | 14 | 4 | 92 | 72 |
| #18 Minnesota | 24 | 9 | 8 | 7 | 4 | 38 | 66 | 62 | 34 | 14 | 13 | 7 | 95 | 94 |
| Notre Dame | 24 | 9 | 9 | 6 | 4 | 37 | 59 | 59 | 34 | 14 | 13 | 7 | 90 | 91 |
| Michigan State | 24 | 11 | 11 | 2 | 0 | 35 | 54 | 54 | 34 | 15 | 17 | 2 | 80 | 82 |
| Wisconsin | 24 | 7 | 15 | 2 | 2 | 25 | 63 | 89 | 34 | 14 | 18 | 2 | 110 | 124 |
Championship: March 21, 2020 † indicates conference regular season champion * indicates conference tournament champion Rankings: USCHO.com Top 20 Poll; updated March 1, 2020

== Schedule and results ==
| Date | Time | Opponent^{#} | Rank^{#} | Site | TV | Decision | Result | Attendance | Record |
Exhibition
| October 6 | 4:00 PM | at USNTDP* | #9 | USA Hockey Arena • Plymouth, Michigan (Exhibition) | | Bischel | W 4–2 | 622 | |
Regular season
| October 11 | 7:10 PM | vs. Air Force* | #8 | Compton Family Ice Arena • Notre Dame, Indiana | NBCSN | Bischel | W 4–3 | 4,977 | 1–0–0 |
| October 13 | 3:05 PM | vs. Air Force* | #8 | Compton Family Ice Arena • Notre Dame, Indiana | NHL Network | Bischel | W 6–1 | 3,506 | 2–0–0 |
| October 25 | 7:10 PM | vs. Lake Superior State* | #5 | Compton Family Ice Arena • Notre Dame, Indiana | NBCSN | Bischel | W 5–2 | 3,991 | 3–0–0 |
| October 26 | 6:05 PM | vs. Lake Superior State* | #5 | Compton Family Ice Arena • Notre Dame, Indiana | NHL Network | Morris | W 6–4 | 4,178 | 4–0–0 |
| November 1 | 8:33 PM | at Minnesota | #5 | 3M Arena at Mariucci • Minneapolis, Minnesota | BTN | Morris | T 2–2 ^{3x3 OTL} | 7,459 | 4–0–1 (0–0–1–0) |
| November 2 | 7:05 PM | at Minnesota | #5 | 3M Arena at Mariucci • Minneapolis, Minnesota | FSN | Morris | W 5–3 | 8,008 | 5–0–1 (1–0–1–0) |
| November 8 | 8:10 PM | vs. #9 Ohio State | #5 | Compton Family Ice Arena • Notre Dame, Indiana | NBCSN | Morris | W 3–2 ^{OT} | 4,740 | 6–0–1 (2–0–1–0) |
| November 9 | 7:05 PM | vs. #9 Ohio State | #5 | Compton Family Ice Arena • Notre Dame, Indiana | | Morris | W 2–1 | 4,858 | 7–0–1 (3–0–1–0) |
| November 15 | 8:02 PM | at #15 Wisconsin | #4 | Kohl Center • Madison, Wisconsin | FSN | Morris | L 0–3 | 9,698 | 7–1–1 (3–1–1–0) |
| November 16 | 8:07 PM | at #15 Wisconsin | #4 | Kohl Center • Madison, Wisconsin | | Morris | W 5–4 ^{OT} | 12,593 | 8–1–1 (4–1–1–0) |
| November 22 | 7:00 PM | at Michigan State | #3 | Munn Ice Arena • East Lansing, Michigan | | Morris | T 1–1 ^{SOW} | 4,898 | 8–1–2 (4–1–2–1) |
| November 23 | 7:00 PM | at Michigan State | #3 | Munn Ice Arena • East Lansing, Michigan | | Morris | L 2–3 | 5,902 | 8–2–2 (4–2–2–1) |
| November 29 | 7:05 PM | vs. #16 Bowling Green* | #5 | Compton Family Ice Arena • Notre Dame, Indiana | NBC Sports Chi+ | Morris | L 2–5 | 5,271 | 8–3–2 (4–2–2–1) |
| November 30 | 7:07 PM | at #16 Bowling Green* | #5 | Slater Family Ice Arena • Bowling Green, Ohio | NBC Sports Chi+ | Bischel | L 2–5 | 3,382 | 8–4–2 (4–2–2–1) |
| December 6 | 7:01 PM | at #10 Boston College* | #9 | Conte Forum • Chestnut Hill, Massachusetts | | Morris | L 0–4 | 7,295 | 8–5–2 (4–2–2–1) |
| December 8 | 5:05 PM | vs. #10 Boston College* | #9 | Compton Family Ice Arena • Notre Dame, Indiana | NBC Sports Phi+ | Morris | L 1–6 | 3,985 | 8–6–2 (4–2–2–1) |
| December 13 | 7:05 PM | vs. #7 Penn State | #15 | Compton Family Ice Arena • Notre Dame, Indiana | NHL Network | Morris | L 2–4 | 3,806 | 8–7–2 (4–3–2–1) |
| December 14 | 6:05 PM | vs. #7 Penn State | #15 | Compton Family Ice Arena • Notre Dame, Indiana | | Morris | W 3–0 | 4,306 | 9–7–2 (5–3–2–1) |
| January 3 | 7:10 PM | vs. #19 Western Michigan* | #15 | Compton Family Ice Arena • Notre Dame, Indiana | NBCSN | Morris | T 1–1 ^{OT} | 5,247 | 9–7–3 (5–3–2–1) |
| January 5 | 5:04 PM | at #19 Western Michigan* | #15 | Lawson Arena • Kalamazoo, Michigan | | Morris | W 4–1 | 3,762 | 10–7–3 (5–3–2–1) |
| January 10 | 7:00 PM | vs. Michigan | #14 | Compton Family Ice Arena • Notre Dame, Indiana | NBCSN | Morris | L 0–3 | 4,896 | 10–8–3 (5–4–2–1) |
| January 11 | 6:00 PM | vs. Michigan | #14 | Compton Family Ice Arena • Notre Dame, Indiana | | Morris | L 1–3 | 4,971 | 10–9–3 (5–5–2–1) |
| January 17 | 6:00 PM | at #9 Ohio State | #18 | Value City Arena • Columbus, Ohio | BTN | Morris | T 4–4 ^{SOW} | 7,507 | 10–9–4 (5–5–3–2) |
| January 18 | 5:00 PM | at #9 Ohio State | #18 | Value City Arena • Columbus, Ohio | | Morris | L 1–2 | 9,835 | 10–10–4 (5–6–3–2) |
| January 24 | 7:00 PM | vs. Wisconsin | | Compton Family Ice Arena • Notre Dame, Indiana | NBC Sports Chi+ | Morris | L 4–6 | 4,895 | 10–11–4 (5–7–3–2) |
| January 25 | 6:00 PM | vs. Wisconsin | | Compton Family Ice Arena • Notre Dame, Indiana | NBC Sports Chi+ | Morris | W 5–2 | 5,453 | 11–11–4 (6–7–3–2) |
| January 31 | 6:00 PM | at #8 Penn State | | Pegula Ice Arena • University Park, Pennsylvania | BTN | Morris | T 3–3 ^{SOW} | 6,226 | 11–11–5 (6–7–4–3) |
| February 1 | 6:00 PM | at #8 Penn State | | Pegula Ice Arena • University Park, Pennsylvania | | Morris | W 4–2 | 6,475 | 12–11–5 (7–7–4–3) |
| February 14 | 7:00 PM | vs. Minnesota | | Compton Family Ice Arena • Notre Dame, Indiana | NBCSN | Morris | T 3-3 ^{OTL} | 4,854 | 12-12-6 (7-7-4-4) |
| February 15 | 7:30 PM | vs. Minnesota | | Compton Family Ice Arena • Notre Dame, Indiana | NBC Sports Chi | Morris | L 1-2 | 5,804 | 12-13-6 (7-8-4-4) |
| February 21 | 4:00 PM | at Michigan | | Yost Ice Arena • Ann Arbor, Michigan | | Morris | W 2-1 | 5,800 | 13-12-6 (8-8-4-4) |
| February 22 | 7:00 PM | at Michigan | | Yost Ice Arena • Ann Arbor, Michigan | BTN | Morris | W 3-0 | 5,800 | 14-12-6 (9-8-4-4) |
| February 28 | 7:00 PM | vs. Michigan State | | Compton Family Ice Arena • Notre Dame, Indiana | NBCSN | Morris | L 1-3 | 5,265 | 14-13-6 (9-9-4-4) |
| February 29 | 6:00 PM | vs. Michigan State | | Compton Family Ice Arena • Notre Dame, Indiana | NBC Sports Phi+ | Morris | T 2-2 ^{SOW} | 5,355 | 14-13-7 (9-9-5-4) |
Big Ten Tournament
| March 6 | 8:00 PM | at #19 Minnesota* | | 3M Arena at Mariucci • Minneapolis, Minnesota (Quarterfinal Game 1) | | Morris | W 1-0 | 2,012 | 15-13-7 |
| March 7 | 8:00 PM | at #19 Minnesota* | | 3M Arena at Mariucci • Minneapolis, Minnesota (Quarterfinal Game 2) | FSN | Morris | L 1-2 | 2,281 | 15-14-7 |
| March 8 | 7:00 PM | at #19 Minnesota* | | 3M Arena at Mariucci • Minneapolis, Minnesota (Quarterfinal Game 3) | | Morris | L 2-3 | 2,039 | 15-15-7 |
Notre Dame Lost Series 1–2
*Non-conference game. ^{#}Rankings from USCHO.com Poll. All times are in Eastern Time.

== Scoring Statistics ==
| Name | Position | Games | Goals | Assists | Points | PIM |
|---|---|---|---|---|---|---|
| Alex Steeves | F | 36 | 11 | 17 | 28 | 10 |
| Cam Morrison | LW | 37 | 13 | 14 | 27 | 8 |
| Mike O'Leary | LW | 37 | 9 | 14 | 23 | 20 |
| Cal Burke | C/RW | 37 | 7 | 14 | 21 | 2 |
| Colin Theisen | LW | 37 | 8 | 12 | 20 | 24 |
| Michael Graham | F | 30 | 4 | 16 | 20 | 6 |
| Spencer Stastney | D | 36 | 3 | 17 | 20 | 17 |
| Matt Hellickson | D | 37 | 5 | 11 | 16 | 16 |
| Trevor Janicke | C | 37 | 8 | 5 | 13 | 6 |
| Tory Dello | D | 37 | 3 | 10 | 13 | 24 |
| Nick Leivermann | D | 32 | 5 | 7 | 12 | 10 |
| Jake Pivonka | C | 35 | 4 | 7 | 11 | 14 |
| Graham Slaggert | C | 37 | 5 | 5 | 10 | 8 |
| Nate Clurman | D | 37 | 0 | 9 | 9 | 10 |
| Jesse Lansdell | F | 37 | 1 | 6 | 7 | 37 |
| Matt Steeves | F | 29 | 1 | 3 | 4 | 6 |
| Cam Burke | C | 36 | 2 | 1 | 3 | 23 |
| Charlie Raith | D | 36 | 2 | 1 | 3 | 19 |
| Pierce Crawford | F | 37 | 1 | 2 | 3 | 16 |
| Max Ellis | RW | 8 | 1 | 0 | 1 | 4 |
| Solag Bakich | F | 10 | 1 | 0 | 1 | 2 |
| Ryan Bischel | G | 7 | 0 | 1 | 1 | 0 |
| Ryan Carmichael | D/F | 8 | 0 | 0 | 0 | 2 |
| Cale Morris | G | 33 | 0 | 0 | 0 | 0 |
| Bench | - | 37 | - | - | - | 12 |
| Total | | | | | | |

== Goaltending statistics ==
| Name | Games | Minutes | Wins | Losses | Ties | Goals against | Saves | Shut outs | SV % | GAA |
|---|---|---|---|---|---|---|---|---|---|---|
| Cale Morris | 33 | 1958 | 12 | 14 | 7 | 79 | 861 | 3 | .916 | 2.42 |
| Ryan Bischel | 7 | 285 | 3 | 1 | 0 | 12 | 130 | 0 | .915 | 2.52 |
| Empty Net | - | 17 | - | - | - | 5 | - | - | - | - |
| Total | 37 | 2260 | 15 | 15 | 7 | 96 | 991 | 3 | .912 | 2.55 |

== Rankings ==
| Poll | Week | | | | | | | | | | | | | | | | | | | | | | | |
| Poll | Pre | 1 | 2 | 3 | 4 | 5 | 6 | 7 | 8 | 9 | 10 | 11 | 12 | 13 | 14 | 15 | 16 | 17 | 18 | 19 | 20 | 21 | 22 | 23 (Final) |
|---|---|---|---|---|---|---|---|---|---|---|---|---|---|---|---|---|---|---|---|---|---|---|---|---|
| USCHO.com | 9 | 8 | 7 | 5 | 5 | 5 | 4 | 3 | 5 | 9 | 15 | 15 | 15 | 14 | 18 | NR | NR | NR | NR | NR | NR | NR | NR | NR |
| USA Today | 10 | 9 | 7 | 4 | 4 | 5 | 3 | 3 | 4 | 10 | 14 | NR | NR | 14 | NR | NR | NR | NR | NR | NR | NR | NR | NR | NR |

== Players drafted into the NHL ==
=== 2020 NHL entry draft ===
| Round | Pick | Player | NHL team |
|---|---|---|---|
| 3 | 79 | Landon Slaggert† | Chicago Blackhawks |
| 5 | 139 | Ryder Rolston† | Colorado Avalanche |

† incoming freshman
