= 2019–20 Michigan State Spartans men's ice hockey season =

- Conference: 6th Big Ten
- Home ice: Munn Ice Arena

Rankings
- USCHO: NR
- USA Today: NR

Record
- Overall: 15–19–2
- Conference: 11–11–2–0
- Home: 7–8–1
- Road: 7–10–1
- Neutral: 1–1–0

Coaches and captains
- Head coach: Danton Cole
- Assistant coaches: Chris Luongo; Joe Exter; Jim Slater
- Captain(s): Sam Saliba; Tommy Apap
- Alternate captain(s): Jerad Rosburg; Patrick Khodorenko

The 2019–20 Michigan State Spartans men's ice hockey season was the 78th season of play for the program and the 30th season in the Big Ten Conference. The Spartans represented Michigan State University and were coached by Danton Cole, in his 3rd season.

== Roster ==
As of September 3, 2019.

No.	Nat.	Player	Class	Pos	Height	Weight	DoB	Hometown	Previous team	NHL rights
1	(United States)	Drew DeRidder	Sophomore	G	5' 10" (1.78 m)	167 lb (76 kg)	2000-05-01	Fenton, Michigan	USNTDP (USHL)	—
4	(United States)	Anthony Scarsella	Senior	D	5' 10" (1.78 m)	188 lb (85 kg)	1996-03-20	White Lake, Michigan	Springfield Jr. Blues (NAHL)	—
7	(United States)	Damian Chrcek	Senior	D	5' 9" (1.75 m)	182 lb (83 kg)	1996-02-17	Marysville, Michigan	Salmon Arm Silverbacks (BCHL)	—
8	(United States)	Cole Krygier	Sophomore	D	6' 2" (1.88 m)	191 lb (87 kg)	2000-05-05	Novi, Michigan	Lincoln Stars (USHL)	FLA, 201st overall 2018
9	(United States)	Mitchell Lewandowski	Junior	F	5' 9" (1.75 m)	177 lb (80 kg)	1998-04-17	Clarkston, Michigan	Chicago Steel (USHL)	—
10	(United States)	Sam Saliba (C)	Senior	F	5' 11" (1.8 m)	184 lb (83 kg)	1995-10-09	Lincolnshire, Illinois	Green Bay Gamblers (USHL)	—
11	(United States)	Tommy Apap (C)	Junior	F	6' 2" (1.88 m)	206 lb (93 kg)	1996-02-27	Bloomfield Hills, Michigan	Youngstown Phantoms (USHL)	—
12	(United States)	Tommy Miller	Junior	D	6' 2" (1.88 m)	186 lb (84 kg)	1999-03-06	West Bloomfield, Michigan	USNTDP (USHL)	—
14	(United States)	Adam Goodsir	Sophomore	F	6' 0" (1.83 m)	188 lb (85 kg)	1998-09-22	Okemos, Michigan	Tri-City Storm (USHL)	—
15	(United States)	Christian Krygier	Sophomore	D	6' 2" (1.88 m)	193 lb (88 kg)	2000-05-05	Novi, Michigan	Lincoln Stars (USHL)	NYI, 196th overall 2018
16	(United States)	Brody Stevens	Junior	F	5' 11" (1.8 m)	191 lb (87 kg)	1997-04-26	Ann Arbor, Michigan	Green Bay Gamblers (USHL)	—
18	(Poland)	Wojciech Stachowiak	Sophomore	F	6' 0" (1.83 m)	197 lb (89 kg)	1999-07-03	Gdańsk, Poland	Central Illinois Flying Aces (USHL)	—
19	(Switzerland)	Nicolas Müller	Freshman	F	6' 0" (1.83 m)	165 lb (75 kg)	1999-06-21	Arisdorf, Switzerland	Modo Hockey J20 (J20 SuperElit)	—
20	(United States)	Josh Nodler	Freshman	F	5' 11" (1.8 m)	191 lb (87 kg)	2001-04-27	Oak Park, Michigan	Fargo Force (USHL)	CGY, 150th overall 2019
21	(United States)	Jake Smith	Junior	F	5' 9" (1.75 m)	183 lb (83 kg)	1996-11-28	East Amherst, New York	Chilliwack Chiefs (BCHL)	—
22	(United States)	Dennis Cesana	Sophomore	D	5' 9" (1.75 m)	189 lb (86 kg)	1998-04-04	Providence, Rhode Island	Brooks Bandits (AJHL)	—
23	(United States)	Jagger Joshua	Freshman	F	6' 2" (1.88 m)	187 lb (85 kg)	1999-03-29	Dearborn, Michigan	Muskegon Lumberjacks (USHL)	—
24	(United States)	Austin Kamer	Junior	F	5' 10" (1.78 m)	184 lb (83 kg)	1996-05-23	Grand Rapids, Michigan	Lone Star Brahmas (NAHL)	—
27	(United States)	Mitchell Mattson	Sophomore	F	6' 4" (1.93 m)	202 lb (92 kg)	1998-01-02	Grand Rapids, Minnesota	Sioux Falls Stampede (USHL)	CGY, 126th overall 2016
28	(Canada)	Gianluca Esteves	Junior	F	5' 9" (1.75 m)	172 lb (78 kg)	1997-01-29	Winnipeg, Manitoba	Aston Rebels (NAHL)	—
31	(United States)	John Lethemon	Senior	G	6' 2" (1.88 m)	171 lb (78 kg)	1996-08-16	Northville, Michigan	Chicago Steel (USHL)	—
41	(United States)	Spencer Wright	Senior	G	6' 2" (1.88 m)	174 lb (79 kg)	1997-06-20	Farmington Hills, Michigan	New Jersey Titans (NAHL)	—
44	(United States)	Butrus Ghafari	Senior	D	5' 11" (1.8 m)	188 lb (85 kg)	1996-07-04	West Bloomfield, Michigan	Bloomington Thunder (USHL)	—
55	(United States)	Patrick Khodorenko (A)	Senior	F	6' 0" (1.83 m)	201 lb (91 kg)	1998-10-13	Walnut Creek, California	USNTDP (USHL)	—
57	(United States)	Jerad Rosburg (A)	Senior (RS)	D	6' 1" (1.85 m)	204 lb (93 kg)	1996-06-18	Clarksville, Maryland	Sioux City Musketeers (USHL)	—
71	(United States)	Logan Lambdin	Senior	F	5' 8" (1.73 m)	177 lb (80 kg)	1995-11-01	Newport, Michigan	Bloomington Thunder (USHL)	—

== Standings ==
2019–20 Big Ten ice hockey Standings
	Conference record								Overall record					
	GP	W	L	T	3/SW	PTS	GF	GA	GP	W	L	T	GF	GA
#9 Penn State	24	12	8	4	1	41	79	70	34	20	10	4	121	88
#10 Ohio State	24	11	9	4	1	38	62	62	34	18	11	5	91	80
#17 Michigan	24	11	10	3	2	38	65	52	34	16	14	4	92	72
#18 Minnesota	24	9	8	7	4	38	66	62	34	14	13	7	95	94
Notre Dame	24	9	9	6	4	37	59	59	34	14	13	7	90	91
Michigan State	24	11	11	2	0	35	54	54	34	15	17	2	80	82
Wisconsin	24	7	15	2	2	25	63	89	34	14	18	2	110	124
Championship: March 21, 2020 † indicates conference regular season champion * indicates conference tournament champion Rankings: USCHO.com Top 20 Poll; updated March 1, 2020

== Schedule and results ==
Date	Time	Opponent^{#}	Rank^{#}	Site	TV	Decision	Result	Attendance	Record
Exhibition
October 7	7:05 PM	vs. Western Ontario*		Munn Ice Arena • East Lansing, Michigan (Exhibition)		Lethemon	W 6–1	2,500	
Regular season
October 11	7:00 PM	at Northern Michigan*		Berry Events Center • Marquette, Michigan		Lethemon	W 5–3	4,043	1–0–0
October 12	6:07 PM	at Northern Michigan*		Berry Events Center • Marquette, Michigan		DeRidder	L 0–2	4,071	1–1–0
October 18	7:05 PM	vs. USNTDP*		Munn Ice Arena • East Lansing, Michigan (Exhibition)		Lethemon	W 2–1	3,897	
October 25	9:37 PM	at Colorado College*		Broadmoor World Arena • Colorado Springs, Colorado	ATTRM	DeRidder	L 1–3	3,430	1–2–0
October 26	8:07 PM	at Colorado College*		Broadmoor World Arena • Colorado Springs, Colorado		Lethemon	W 5–1	3,390	2–2–0
November 1	7:05 PM	vs. #4 Cornell*		Munn Ice Arena • East Lansing, Michigan		Lethemon	L 2–3	5,203	2–3–0
November 2	7:05 PM	vs. #4 Cornell*		Munn Ice Arena • East Lansing, Michigan		DeRidder	L 2–6	5,752	2–4–0
November 8	7:07 PM	at #6 Penn State		Pegula Ice Arena • University Park, Pennsylvania		Lethemon	W 2–0	6,071	3–4–0 (1–0–0–0)
November 9	6:07 PM	at #6 Penn State		Pegula Ice Arena • University Park, Pennsylvania		Lethemon	L 4–6	5,936	3–5–0 (1–1–0–0)
November 14	6:31 PM	at Michigan		Yost Ice Arena • Ann Arbor, Michigan	BTN	Lethemon	W 4–3	5,233	4–5–0 (2–1–0–0)
November 16	7:00 PM	vs. Michigan		Munn Ice Arena • East Lansing, Michigan		Lethemon	W 3–0	6,552	5–5–0 (3–1–0–0)
November 22	7:00 PM	vs. #3 Notre Dame		Munn Ice Arena • East Lansing, Michigan		Lethemon	T 1–1 ^{SOL}	4,898	5–5–1 (3–1–1–0)
November 23	7:00 PM	vs. #3 Notre Dame		Munn Ice Arena • East Lansing, Michigan		Lethemon	W 3–2	5,902	6–5–1 (4–1–1–0)
November 30	5:00 PM	at #11 Ohio State	#20	Value City Arena • Columbus, Ohio		Lethemon	L 1–3	4,251	6–6–1 (4–2–1–0)
December 1	2:31 PM	at #11 Ohio State	#20	Value City Arena • Columbus, Ohio	BTN	Lethemon	L 0–2	4,222	6–7–1 (4–3–1–0)
December 6	7:00 PM	vs. #19 Wisconsin		Munn Ice Arena • East Lansing, Michigan		Lethemon	W 3–0	6,007	7–7–1 (5–3–1–0)
December 7	7:00 PM	vs. #19 Wisconsin		Munn Ice Arena • East Lansing, Michigan		Lethemon	W 5–4 ^{OT}	5,608	8–7–1 (6–3–1–0)
December 14	7:00 PM	vs. #16 Arizona State*	#18	Munn Ice Arena • East Lansing, Michigan		Lethemon	L 3–4	5,306	8–8–1 (6–3–1–0)
December 15	5:00 PM	vs. #16 Arizona State*	#18	Munn Ice Arena • East Lansing, Michigan		Lethemon	W 1–0 ^{OT}	5,004	9–8–1 (6–3–1–0)
Great Lakes Invitational
December 30	1:07 PM	vs. Michigan Tech*	#18	Little Caesars Arena • Detroit, Michigan (GLI Semifinal)		Lethemon	L 2–4	16,139	9–9–1 (6–3–1–0)
December 31	11:37 AM	vs. Ferris State*	#18	Little Caesars Arena • Detroit, Michigan (GLI Third Place)		Lethemon	W 5–2	10,240	10–9–1 (6–3–1–0)
January 10	6:00 PM	at vs. Minnesota	#20	Munn Ice Arena • East Lansing, Michigan	BTN	Lethemon	W 4–1	6,346	11–9–1 (7–3–1–0)
January 11	7:00 PM	at vs. Minnesota	#20	Munn Ice Arena • East Lansing, Michigan	BTN	Lethemon	L 0–2	5,923	11–10–1 (7–4–1–0)
January 17	9:00 PM	vs. Wisconsin	#20	Kohl Center • Madison, Wisconsin	ESPNU	Lethemon	W 4–0	9,336	12–10–1 (8–4–1–0)
January 18	8:00 PM	vs. Wisconsin	#20	Kohl Center • Madison, Wisconsin	FSW+	Lethemon	L 1–3	12,813	12–11–1 (8–5–1–0)
January 24	7:00 PM	vs. #9 Penn State	#19	Munn Ice Arena • East Lansing, Michigan		Lethemon	W 4–2	6,017	13–11–1 (9–5–1–0)
January 25	6:00 PM	vs. #9 Penn State	#19	Munn Ice Arena • East Lansing, Michigan	BTN	Lethemon	L 1–2 ^{OT}	6,586	13–12–1 (9–6–1–0)
February 7	8:00 PM	at Minnesota	#19	3M Arena at Mariucci • Minneapolis, Minnesota	FSN+	Lethemon	L 1–4	8,860	13–13–1 (9–7–1–0)
February 8	6:00 PM	at Minnesota	#19	3M Arena at Mariucci • Minneapolis, Minnesota	FSN+	Lethemon	W 4–2	9,661	14–13–1 (10–7–1–0)
February 14	6:00 PM	vs. Michigan		Munn Ice Arena • East Lansing, Michigan	BTN	Lethemon	L 1–5	6,796	14–14–1 (10–8–1–0)
February 17	7:07 PM	vs. Michigan		Little Caesars Arena • Detroit, Michigan	FSD	Lethemon	L 1–4	8,455	14–15–1 (10–9–1–0)
February 21	7:00 PM	vs. #12 Ohio State		Munn Ice Arena • East Lansing, Michigan		DeRidder	L 0–1	6,376	14–16–1 (10–10–1–0)
February 22	7:00 PM	vs. #12 Ohio State		Munn Ice Arena • East Lansing, Michigan		Lethemon	L 2–4	6,746	14–17–1 (10–11–1–0)
February 28	7:00 PM	at Notre Dame		Compton Family Ice Arena • Notre Dame, Indiana	NBCSN	Lethemon	W 3–1	5,265	15–17–1 (11–11–1–0)
February 29	6:00 PM	at Notre Dame		Compton Family Ice Arena • Notre Dame, Indiana	NBC Sports Phi+	Lethemon	T 2–2 ^{SOL}	5,355	15–17–2 (11–11–2–0)
Big Ten Tournament
March 6	7:00 PM	at Michigan*		Yost Ice Arena • Ann Arbor, Michigan (Quarterfinal Game 1)		Lethemon	L 0–3	3,238	15–18–2 (11–11–2–0)
March 7	7:00 PM	at Michigan*		Yost Ice Arena • Ann Arbor, Michigan (Quarterfinal Game 2)		Lethemon	L 0–3	4,226	15–19–2 (11–11–2–0)
Michigan State Lost Series 0–2
*Non-conference game. ^{#}Rankings from USCHO.com Poll. All times are in Eastern Time.

== Scoring Statistics ==
Name	Position	Games	Goals	Assists	Points	PIM
Patrick Khodorenko	C	36	16	17	33	20
Dennis Cesana	D	36	7	15	22	28
Mitchell Lewandowski	LW	36	8	12	20	28
Sam Saliba	F	36	10	7	17	8
Logan Lambdin	LW	35	7	10	17	22
Jerad Rosburg	D	36	4	13	17	22
Tommy Apap	F	36	7	5	12	8
Tommy Miller	D	36	2	7	9	4
Brody Stevens	C	36	3	5	8	30
Nicolas Müller	C/RW	36	3	5	8	10
Josh Nodler	C	36	3	5	8	2
Gianluca Esteves	F	35	2	6	8	2
Jagger Joshua	F	36	2	5	7	35
Cole Krygier	D	36	3	3	6	20
Butrus Ghafari	D	36	2	3	5	24
Adam Goodsir	F	36	0	4	4	16
Christian Krygier	D	35	0	3	3	48
Austin Kamer	RW	34	1	1	2	2
Wojciech Stachowiak	LW	13	0	1	1	0
Mitchell Mattson	C	22	0	1	1	0
Anthony Scarsella	D	1	0	0	0	0
Spencer Wright	G	1	0	0	0	10
Drew DeRidder	G	4	0	0	0	0
Jake Smith	F	5	0	0	0	0
John Lethemon	G	33	0	0	0	0
Bench	-	36	-	-	-	5
Total						

== Goaltending statistics ==
Name	Games	Minutes	Wins	Losses	Ties	Goals against	Saves	Shut outs	SV %	GAA
Spencer Wright	1	0:14	0	0	0	0	0	0	-	0.00
John Lethemon	33	1944	15	15	2	69	993	5	.935	2.13
Drew DeRidder	4	214	0	4	0	10	91	0	.901	2.80
Empty Net	-	17	-	-	-	9	-	-	-	-
Total	36	2176	15	19	2	88	1084	5	.925	2.43

== Rankings ==
Poll	Week																							
Poll	Pre	1	2	3	4	5	6	7	8	9	10	11	12	13	14	15	16	17	18	19	20	21	22	23 (Final)
USCHO.com	NR	NR	NR	NR	NR	NR	NR	NR	20	NR	18	18	18	20	20	19	17	19	NR	NR	NR	NR	NR	NR
USA Today	NR	NR	NR	NR	NR	NR	NR	NR	NR	NR	NR	NR	NR	NR	NR	NR	NR	NR	NR	NR	NR	NR	NR	NR
