= 2019–20 Ohio State Buckeyes men's ice hockey season =

IceBreaker Invitational, Champion
- Conference: T–2nd Big Ten
- Home ice: Value City Arena

Rankings
- USCHO: 10
- USA Today: 10

Record
- Overall: 20–11–5
- Conference: 11–9–4–1
- Home: 11–3–4
- Road: 7–7–0
- Neutral: 2–1–1

Coaches and captains
- Head coach: Steve Rohlik
- Assistant coaches: Steve Miller; J. B. Bittner; Dustin Carlson
- Captain: Ronnie Hein
- Alternate captain(s): Carson Meyer; Tanner Laczynski; Austin Pooley

The 2019–20 Ohio State Buckeyes men's ice hockey season was the 57th season of play for the program and the 7th season in the Big Ten Conference. The Buckeyes represented the Ohio State University and were coached by Steve Rohlik, in his 7th season.

On March 12, 2020, the Big Ten announced that the tournament was cancelled due to the coronavirus pandemic.

== Roster ==
As of September 3, 2019.

No.	Nat.	Player	Class	Pos	Height	Weight	DoB	Hometown	Previous team	NHL rights
2	(United States)	James Marooney	Freshman	D	5' 9" (1.75 m)	165 lb (75 kg)	1999-08-16	Chaska, Minnesota	Waterloo Black Hawks (USHL)	—
3	(United States)	Collin Peters	Junior	F	6' 0" (1.83 m)	185 lb (84 kg)	1997-02-05	Sheboygan, Wisconsin	Lincoln Stars (USHL)	—
4	(Canada)	Layton Ahac	Freshman	D	6' 2" (1.88 m)	195 lb (88 kg)	2001-02-22	North Vancouver, British Columbia	Prince George Spruce Kings (BCHL)	—
5		Gordi Myer	Senior	D	5' 10" (1.78 m)	179 lb (81 kg)	1996-02-28	Sylvania, Ohio	Green Bay Gamblers (USHL)	—
7	(United States)	Wyatt Ege	Senior (RS)	D	5' 11" (1.8 m)	174 lb (79 kg)	1995-03-19	Elk River, Minnesota	Alaska Anchorage (WCHA)	—
8	(Ukraine)	Eugene Fadyeyev	Junior	F	5' 11" (1.8 m)	170 lb (77 kg)	1997-10-08	Kyiv, Ukraine	Madison Capitols (USHL)	—
9	(United States)	Tanner Laczynski (A)	Senior	F	6' 1" (1.85 m)	205 lb (93 kg)	1997-06-01	Shorewood, Illinois	Lincoln Stars (USHL)	PHI, 169th overall 2016
11	(United States)	Kamil Sadlocha	Sophomore	F	5' 11" (1.8 m)	185 lb (84 kg)	1999-04-12	Carpentersville, Illinois	Madison Capitols (USHL)	—
12	(United States)	Miguel Fidler	Senior (RS)	F	6' 1" (1.85 m)	198 lb (90 kg)	1996-03-14	Edina, Minnesota	Madison Capitols (USHL)	FLA, 143rd overall 2014
13	(United States)	Tate Singleton	Freshman	F	5' 9" (1.75 m)	177 lb (80 kg)	1998-09-05	West Lebanon, New Hampshire	Central Illinois Flying Aces (USHL)	—
14	(United States)	Austin Pooley (A)	Junior	F	6' 2" (1.88 m)	210 lb (95 kg)	1996-07-31	Dublin, Ohio	Youngstown Phantoms (USHL)	—
16	(United States)	Quinn Preston	Sophomore	F	5' 11" (1.8 m)	182 lb (83 kg)	1997-10-21	Trenton, Michigan	Dubuque Fighting Saints (USHL)	—
17	(United States)	Sam McCormick	Senior	F	5' 10" (1.78 m)	170 lb (77 kg)	1997-02-20	De Pere, Wisconsin	Waterloo Black Hawks (USHL)	—
18	(United States)	Michael Gildon	Freshman	F	6' 2" (1.88 m)	196 lb (89 kg)	2001-06-21	Plano, Texas	USNTDP (USHL)	—
19	(United States)	Matthew Jennings	Sophomore	F	5' 8" (1.73 m)	173 lb (78 kg)	1997-06-07	Buford, Georgia	Green Bay Gamblers (USHL)	—
24	(Canada)	Ryan O'Connell	Sophomore	D	6' 1" (1.85 m)	185 lb (84 kg)	1999-04-25	Manotick, Ontario	Penticton Vees (BCHL)	TOR, 203rd overall 2017
26	(Canada)	Jaedon Leslie	Freshman	F	6' 1" (1.85 m)	187 lb (85 kg)	1998-08-04	St. Albert, Alberta	Fort McMurray Oil Barons (AJHL)	—
29	(Sweden)	Gustaf Westlund	Sophomore	F	6' 0" (1.83 m)	175 lb (79 kg)	1997-12-12	Stockholm, Sweden	Lincoln Stars (USHL)	—
30	(United States)	Ryan Snowden	Freshman	G	6' 3" (1.91 m)	205 lb (93 kg)	1998-03-06	Lincoln University, Pennsylvania	Central Illinois Flying Aces (HEA)	—
31	(United States)	Evan Moyse	Junior	G	6' 2" (1.88 m)	180 lb (82 kg)	1996-06-18	Olmsted Falls, Ohio	Wichita Falls Wildcats (NAHL)	—
37	(United States)	Tommy Nappier	Junior	G	6' 3" (1.91 m)	220 lb (100 kg)	1998-06-22	St. Louis, Missouri	Omaha Lancers (USHL)	—
40	(United States)	Ronnie Hein (C)	Senior	F	6' 0" (1.83 m)	188 lb (85 kg)	1997-01-22	Chelsea, Michigan	Waterloo Black Hawks (USHL)	—
44	(United States)	Dalton Messina	Freshman	F	5' 11" (1.8 m)	195 lb (88 kg)	1998-03-29	Macomb, Michigan	Youngstown Phantoms (USHL)	—
50	(United States)	Matt Miller	Senior	D	6' 1" (1.85 m)	209 lb (95 kg)	1995-08-22	East Palestine, Ohio	Youngstown Phantoms (USHL)	—
61	(United States)	Grant Gabriele	Junior	D	6' 2" (1.88 m)	197 lb (89 kg)	1997-04-17	Brighton, Michigan	Waterloo Black Hawks (USHL)	—
65	(United States)	C. J. Regula	Freshman	D	6' 3" (1.91 m)	205 lb (93 kg)	1998-05-29	Bloomfield Hills, Michigan	Shreveport Mudbugs (NAHL)	—
72	(United States)	Carson Meyer (A)	Senior	F	5' 11" (1.8 m)	185 lb (84 kg)	1997-08-18	Powell, Ohio	Miami (NCHC)	CBJ, 179th overall 2017

== Standings ==
2019–20 Big Ten ice hockey Standings
	Conference record								Overall record					
	GP	W	L	T	3/SW	PTS	GF	GA	GP	W	L	T	GF	GA
#9 Penn State	24	12	8	4	1	41	79	70	34	20	10	4	121	88
#10 Ohio State	24	11	9	4	1	38	62	62	34	18	11	5	91	80
#17 Michigan	24	11	10	3	2	38	65	52	34	16	14	4	92	72
#18 Minnesota	24	9	8	7	4	38	66	62	34	14	13	7	95	94
Notre Dame	24	9	9	6	4	37	59	59	34	14	13	7	90	91
Michigan State	24	11	11	2	0	35	54	54	34	15	17	2	80	82
Wisconsin	24	7	15	2	2	25	63	89	34	14	18	2	110	124
Championship: March 21, 2020 † indicates conference regular season champion * indicates conference tournament champion Rankings: USCHO.com Top 20 Poll; updated March 1, 2020

== Schedule and results ==
Date	Time	Opponent^{#}	Rank^{#}	Site	TV	Decision	Result	Attendance	Record
Exhibition
October 6	5:00 PM	vs. Western Ontario*	#12	Value City Arena • Columbus, Ohio (Exhibition)		Moyse	W 5–2	2,809	
IceBreaker Invitational
October 11	5:00 PM	vs. #14 Western Michigan*	#12	Huntington Center • Toledo, Ohio (IceBreaker Semifinal)		Nappier	T 2–2 ^{SOW}	-	0–0–1
October 12	5:00 PM	vs. RIT*	#12	Huntington Center • Toledo, Ohio (IceBreaker Championship)		Nappier	W 3–1	-	1–0–1
Regular season
October 18	7:00 PM	vs. Omaha*	#12	Value City Arena • Columbus, Ohio		Nappier	W 3–2	3,906	2–0–1
October 19	5:00 PM	vs. Omaha*	#12	Value City Arena • Columbus, Ohio		Nappier	L 1–2	4,385	2–1–1
October 25	7:05 PM	at Mercyhurst*	#15	Mercyhurst Ice Center • Erie, Pennsylvania		Nappier	W 7–2	1,203	3–1–1
October 26	7:05 PM	at Mercyhurst*	#15	Mercyhurst Ice Center • Erie, Pennsylvania		Nappier	W 3–1	978	4–1–1
November 1	7:00 PM	vs. Michigan	#13	Value City Arena • Columbus, Ohio (Rivalry)		Nappier	W 3–2	6,317	5–1–1 (1–0–0–0)
November 2	5:00 PM	vs. Michigan	#13	Value City Arena • Columbus, Ohio (Rivalry)		Nappier	W 2–1	7,517	6–1–1 (2–0–0–0)
November 8	8:10 PM	at #5 Notre Dame	#9	Compton Family Ice Arena • Notre Dame, Indiana	NBCSN	Nappier	L 2–3 ^{OT}	4,740	6–2–1 (2–1–0–0)
November 9	7:05 PM	at #5 Notre Dame	#9	Compton Family Ice Arena • Notre Dame, Indiana		Nappier	L 1–2	4,858	6–3–1 (2–2–0–0)
November 22	7:07 PM	at #6 Penn State	#11	Pegula Ice Arena • University Park, Pennsylvania		Nappier	L 4–5	5,739	6–4–1 (2–3–0–0)
November 16	6:07 PM	at #6 Penn State	#11	Pegula Ice Arena • University Park, Pennsylvania		Snowden	W 4–3	5,213	7–4–1 (3–3–0–0)
November 30	5:00 PM	vs. #20 Michigan State	#11	Value City Arena • Columbus, Ohio		Snowden	W 3–1	4,251	8–4–1 (4–3–0–0)
December 1	2:31 PM	vs. #20 Michigan State	#11	Value City Arena • Columbus, Ohio	BTN	Nappier	W 2–0	4,222	9–4–1 (5–3–0–0)
December 6	8:01 PM	vs. Minnesota	#7	Value City Arena • Columbus, Ohio		Nappier	W 3–2 ^{OT}	5,321	10–4–1 (6–3–0–0)
December 7	8:00 PM	vs. Minnesota	#7	Value City Arena • Columbus, Ohio		Nappier	T 1–1 ^{3x3L}	3,816	10–4–2 (6–3–1–0)
December 27	7:00 PM	vs. Colgate*	#6	Value City Arena • Columbus, Ohio		Nappier	W 3–2	4,651	11–4–2 (6–3–1–0)
December 28	4:00 PM	vs. Colgate*	#6	Value City Arena • Columbus, Ohio		Nappier	W 3–0	4,490	12–4–2 (6–3–1–0)
Fortress Invitational
January 3	11:35 PM	vs. #2 Cornell*	#6	T-Mobile Arena • Paradise, Nevada (Fortress Invitational Semifinal)		Nappier	L 2–5	3,735	12–5–2 (6–3–1–0)
January 5	12:05 AM	vs. #20 Army*	#6	T-Mobile Arena • Paradise, Nevada (Fortress Invitational Third Place)		Nappier	W 2–1 ^{OT}	4,769	13–5–2 (6–3–1–0)
January 10	9:00 PM	at Wisconsin	#8	Kohl Center • Madison, Wisconsin	ESPNU	Nappier	W 4–2	8,869	14–5–2 (7–3–1–0)
January 11	8:00 PM	at Wisconsin	#8	Kohl Center • Madison, Wisconsin	FSW+	Snowden	L 2–5	12,192	14–6–2 (7–4–1–0)
January 17	6:00 PM	vs. #18 Notre Dame Fighting	#9	Value City Arena • Columbus, Ohio	BTN	Snowden	T 4–4 ^{SOL}	7,507	14–6–3 (7–4–2–0)
January 18	5:00 PM	vs. #18 Notre Dame	#9	Value City Arena • Columbus, Ohio		Snowden	W 2–1	9,835	15–6–3 (8–4–2–0)
January 24	8:00 PM	at Minnesota	#6	3M Arena at Mariucci • Minneapolis, Minnesota	FSN+	Nappier	L 3–6	7,489	15–7–3 (8–5–2–0)
January 25	8:30 PM	at Minnesota	#6	3M Arena at Mariucci • Minneapolis, Minnesota	BTN	Nappier	L 1–4	8,426	15–8–3 (8–6–2–0)
January 31	7:30 PM	at Michigan	#11	Yost Ice Arena • Ann Arbor, Michigan (Rivalry)		Nappier	L 2–3	5,800	15–9–3 (8–7–2–0)
February 1	7:30 PM	at Michigan	#11	Yost Ice Arena • Ann Arbor, Michigan (Rivalry)		Nappier	W 4–1	5,800	16–9–3 (9–7–2–0)
February 7	7:00 PM	vs. #9 Penn State	#13	Value City Arena • Columbus, Ohio		Nappier	T 2–2 ^{SOW}	7,704	16–9–4 (9–7–3–1)
February 8	5:00 PM	vs. #9 Penn State	#13	Value City Arena • Columbus, Ohio		Nappier	L 3–6	9,295	16–10–4 (9–8–3–1)
February 21	7:00 PM	at Michigan State	#12	Munn Ice Arena • East Lansing, Michigan		Nappier	W 1–0	6,376	17–10–4 (10–8–3–1)
February 22	7:00 PM	at Michigan State	#12	Munn Ice Arena • East Lansing, Michigan		Nappier	W 4–2	6,746	18–10–4 (11–8–3–1)
February 28	6:00 PM	vs. Wisconsin	#10	Value City Arena • Columbus, Ohio	BTN	Nappier	L 2–3	6,229	18–11–4 (11–9–3–1)
February 29	8:00 PM	vs. Wisconsin	#10	Value City Arena • Columbus, Ohio	BTN	Nappier	T 3–3 ^{3x3L}	9,152	18–11–5 (11–9–4–1)
Big Ten Tournament
March 6	7:00 PM	vs. Wisconsin	#14	Value City Arena • Columbus, Ohio (Big Ten Quarterfinals)	BTN+	Nappier	W 9–1	1,694	19–11–5 (11–9–4–1)
March 7	7:00 PM	vs. Wisconsin	#11	Value City Arena • Columbus, Ohio (Big Ten Quarterfinals)	BTN+	Nappier	W 2–1 ^{OT}	2,626	20–11–5 (11–9–4–1)
Remainder of Tournament Cancelled
*Non-conference game. ^{#}Rankings from USCHO.com Poll. All times are in Eastern Time.

== Scoring Statistics ==
Name	Position	Games	Goals	Assists	Points	PIM
Tanner Laczynski	C	36	11	23	34	22
Carson Meyer	RW	35	17	14	31	26
Quinn Preston	F	34	15	11	26	35
Gustaf Westlund	C	34	12	14	26	43
Ronnie Hein	C	35	8	9	17	14
Tate Singleton	F	36	6	11	17	18
Matt Miller	D	26	5	12	17	12
Gordi Myer	D	36	5	9	14	13
Grant Gabriele	D	36	4	9	13	4
Wyatt Ege	D	35	4	8	12	8
Austin Pooley	C	36	3	9	12	10
Jaedon Leslie	F	15	4	3	7	0
Ryan O'Connell	D	29	1	6	7	6
Miguel Fidler	LW	30	1	4	5	10
Eugene Fadyeyev	F	32	0	5	5	21
Sam McCormick	RW	36	1	3	4	6
Matthew Jennings	C	29	2	1	3	0
Michael Gildon	LW	8	1	2	3	2
C. J. Regula	D	23	0	3	3	0
Layton Ahac	D	36	0	3	3	25
Colin Peters	F	22	1	1	2	16
Kamil Sadlocha	C	21	1	0	1	4
James Marooney	D	33	0	1	1	2
Tommy Nappier	G	32	0	1	1	2
Ryan Snowden	G	5	0	0	0	0
Dalton Messina	F	10	0	0	0	4
Bench	-	-	-	-	-	10
Total			102	162	264	313

== Goaltending statistics ==
Name	Games	Minutes	Wins	Losses	Ties	Goals against	Saves	Shut outs	SV %	GAA
Tommy Nappier	32	1912	17	10	4	65	884	3	.932	2.04
Ryan Snowden	5	261	3	1	1	11	105	0	.905	2.52
Empty Net	-	21	-	-	-	6	-	-	-	-
Total	36	2196	20	11	5	82	989	3	.923	2.24

== Rankings ==
Poll	Week																							
Poll	Pre	1	2	3	4	5	6	7	8	9	10	11	12	13	14	15	16	17	18	19	20	21	22	23 (Final)
USCHO.com	12	12	12	15	13	9	11	11	11	7	6	6	6	8	9	6	11	13	13	12	10	11	10	10
USA Today	13	14	13	15	13	8	11	11	11	8	6	7	7	7	9	6	11	13	13	12	10	11	10	10

== Players drafted into the NHL ==
=== 2020 NHL entry draft ===
Round	Pick	Player	NHL team
2	58	Mason Lohrei†	Boston Bruins
5	136	Jakub Dobes†	Montreal Canadiens

† incoming freshman
