= 2019–20 Michigan Wolverines men's ice hockey season =

Sports team

- Conference: T–2nd Big Ten
- Home ice: Yost Ice Arena

Rankings
- USCHO: #17
- USA Today: #15

Record
- Overall: 18–14–4
- Conference: 11–10–3–2
- Home: 7–7–2
- Road: 7–6–2
- Neutral: 2–1–0

Coaches and captains
- Head coach: Mel Pearson
- Captain: William Lockwood
- Alternate captain(s): Griffin Luce; Luke Martin; Jake Slaker

The 2019–20 Michigan Wolverines men's hockey team was the Wolverines' 98th season. They represent the University of Michigan in the 2019–20 NCAA Division I men's ice hockey season. The team was coached by Mel Pearson, in his third year as head coach, and played their home games at Yost Ice Arena.

On March 12, 2020, the Big Ten announced that the tournament was cancelled due to the coronavirus pandemic.

== Previous season ==
During the 2018–19 ice hockey season, Michigan went 13–16–7, including 9–10–5 in Big Ten play. Michigan lost in the quarterfinals of the 2019 Big Ten Men's Ice Hockey Tournament to Minnesota in two games.

== Roster ==
As of October 28, 2019

No.	Nat.	Player	Class	Pos	Height	Weight	DoB	Hometown	Previous team	NHL rights
2		Luke Martin (A)	Senior	D	6' 3" (1.91 m)	215 lb (98 kg)	1998-09-20	St. Louis, Missouri	USNTDP (USHL)	CAR, 52nd overall 2017
4		Cam York	Freshman	D	5' 11" (1.8 m)	174 lb (79 kg)	2001-01-05	Anaheim, California	USNTDP (USHL)	PHI, 14th overall 2019
5		Griffin Luce (A)	Senior	D	6' 3" (1.91 m)	214 lb (97 kg)	1998-03-10	Williamsville, New York	USNTDP (USHL)	—
6		Jack Summers	Sophomore	D	5' 11" (1.8 m)	180 lb (82 kg)	1999-05-18	Livonia, Michigan	Tri-City (USHL)	—
7		Nick Blankenburg	Sophomore	D	5' 9" (1.75 m)	160 lb (73 kg)	1998-05-12	Washington, Michigan	Okotoks Oilers (AJHL)	—
8		Jack Becker	Junior	F	6' 4" (1.93 m)	205 lb (93 kg)	1997-06-24	Dellwood, Minnesota	Sioux Falls Stampede (USHL)	BOS, 195th overall 2015
9		Eric Ciccolini	Freshman	F	6' 0" (1.83 m)	170 lb (77 kg)	2001-01-14	Vaughan, Ontario	Toronto Jr. Canadiens (OJHL)	NYR, 205th overall 2019
10		Will Lockwood (C)	Senior	F	5' 11" (1.8 m)	172 lb (78 kg)	1998-06-20	Bloomfield Hills, Michigan	USNTDP (USHL)	VAN, 64th overall 2016
12		Dakota Raabe	Junior	F	5' 9" (1.75 m)	170 lb (77 kg)	1997-05-06	Capistrano Beach, California	Wenatchee Wild (BCHL)	—
13		Jake Slaker (A)	Senior	F	5' 10" (1.78 m)	184 lb (83 kg)	1996-06-28	San Diego, California	Bloomington Thunder (USHL)	—
15		Shane Switzer	Graduate	D	6' 2" (1.88 m)	190 lb (86 kg)	1995-11-13	Bloomfield Hills, Michigan	Boston University (HEA)	—
16		Jacob Hayhurst	Graduate	F	5' 8" (1.73 m)	165 lb (75 kg)	1997-01-20	Mississauga, Ontario	RPI (ECAC)	—
17		Johnny Beecher	Freshman	F	6' 3" (1.91 m)	209 lb (95 kg)	2001-04-05	Elmira, New York	USNTDP (USHL)	BOS, 30th overall 2019
18		Adam Winborg	Senior	F	6' 2" (1.88 m)	205 lb (93 kg)	1995-03-31	Stockholm, Sweden	Janesville Jets (NAHL)	—
19		Jack Olmstead	Sophomore	F	5' 10" (1.78 m)	165 lb (75 kg)	1998-02-06	Troy, Michigan	Wilkes-Barre/Scranton Knights (NAHL)	—
20		Keaton Pehrson	Freshman	D	6' 2" (1.88 m)	194 lb (88 kg)	1998-12-10	Lakeville, Minnesota	Tri-City Storm (USHL)	—
21		Michael Pastujov	Junior	F	6' 0" (1.83 m)	190 lb (86 kg)	1999-08-23	Bradenton, Florida	USNTDP (USHL)	—
23		Jimmy Lambert	Sophomore	F	6' 0" (1.83 m)	175 lb (79 kg)	2000-06-20	Saskatoon, Canada	Vernon Vipers (BCHL)	—
25		Luke Morgan	Junior (RS)	F	5' 11" (1.8 m)	190 lb (86 kg)	1997-08-28	Brighton, Michigan	Cedar Rapids RoughRiders (USHL)	—
27		Nolan Moyle	Sophomore	F	6' 2" (1.88 m)	185 lb (84 kg)	1999-04-13	Briarcliff Manor, New York	Green Bay Gamblers (USHL)	—
28		Emil Öhrvall	Sophomore (RS)	F	5' 11" (1.8 m)	170 lb (77 kg)	1998-06-10	Växjö, Sweden	Waterloo (USHL)	—
30		Hayden Lavigne	Senior	G	6' 3" (1.91 m)	200 lb (91 kg)	1996-04-07	Brampton, Ontario	Bloomington Thunder (USHL)	—
31		Strauss Mann	Sophomore	G	6' 0" (1.83 m)	175 lb (79 kg)	1998-08-18	Greenwich, Connecticut	Fargo Force (USHL)	—
37		Jack Leavy	Sophomore	G	6' 5" (1.96 m)	205 lb (93 kg)	1997-09-19	Birmingham, Michigan	Johnstown Tomahawks (NAHL)	—
51		Garrett Van Wyhe	Sophomore	F	6' 2" (1.88 m)	200 lb (91 kg)	1997-04-30	Seattle, Washington	Fargo Force (USHL)	—
55		James Gingell	Sophomore	D	6' 0" (1.83 m)	205 lb (93 kg)	1997-02-11	Dexter, Michigan	Youngstown Phantoms (USHL)	—
71		Nick Granowicz	Freshman	F	6' 1" (1.85 m)	174 lb (79 kg)	1998-03-28	Macomb, Michigan	Merritt Centennials (BCHL)	—
91		Nick Pastujov	Senior	F	6' 0" (1.83 m)	202 lb (92 kg)	1998-01-21	Bradenton, Florida	USNTDP (USHL)	NYI, 193rd overall 2016

== Coaching staff ==
Name	Position coached	Seasons at Michigan
Mel Pearson	Head Coach	3rd
Bill Muckalt	Associate head coach	3rd
Kris Mayotte	Assistant Coach	1st
Matt Hunwick	Volunteer Assistant Coach	1st
Steve Shields	Program Assistant	3rd
Rick Bancroft	Director of Hockey Operations	2nd
Joe Maher	Head Strength and Conditioning Coach	7th

== Standings ==
2019–20 Big Ten ice hockey Standings
	Conference record								Overall record					
	GP	W	L	T	3/SW	PTS	GF	GA	GP	W	L	T	GF	GA
#9 Penn State	24	12	8	4	1	41	79	70	34	20	10	4	121	88
#10 Ohio State	24	11	9	4	1	38	62	62	34	18	11	5	91	80
#17 Michigan	24	11	10	3	2	38	65	52	34	16	14	4	92	72
#18 Minnesota	24	9	8	7	4	38	66	62	34	14	13	7	95	94
Notre Dame	24	9	9	6	4	37	59	59	34	14	13	7	90	91
Michigan State	24	11	11	2	0	35	54	54	34	15	17	2	80	82
Wisconsin	24	7	15	2	2	25	63	89	34	14	18	2	110	124
Championship: March 21, 2020 † indicates conference regular season champion * indicates conference tournament champion Rankings: USCHO.com Top 20 Poll; updated March 1, 2020

== Schedule and results ==
Date	Time	Opponent^{#}	Rank^{#}	Site	TV	Decision	Result	Attendance	Record
Exhibition
October 6	4:00 PM	Windsor*		Yost Ice Arena • Ann Arbor, MI (Exhibition)		Mann	W 8–2	4,855	
Regular season
October 11	7:30 PM	#11 Clarkson*		Yost Ice Arena • Ann Arbor, MI		Mann	T 1–1	4,826	0–0–1
October 12	7:30 PM	#11 Clarkson*		Yost Ice Arena • Ann Arbor, MI		Mann	L 1–3	5,080	0–1–1
October 18	7:30 PM	Lake Superior State*		Yost Ice Arena • Ann Arbor, MI		Mann	W 4–0	5,405	1–1–1
October 19	7:30 PM	Lake Superior State*		Yost Ice Arena • Ann Arbor, MI		Mann	W 4–3	5,404	2–1–1
October 25	7:30 PM	#18 Western Michigan*		Yost Ice Arena • Ann Arbor, MI		Mann	W 4–0	5,800	3–1–1
October 26	7:05 PM	at #18 Western Michigan*		Lawson Ice Arena • Kalamazoo, MI		Mann	L 1–4	3,985	3–2–1
November 1	7:00 PM	at #13 Ohio State		Value City Arena • Columbus, OH (Rivalry)		Mann	L 2–3	6,317	3–3–1 (0–1–0–0)
November 2	5:00 PM	at #13 Ohio State		Value City Arena • Columbus, OH (Rivalry)		Mann	L 1–2	7,517	3–4–1 (0–2–0–0)
November 8	6:30 PM	Minnesota		Yost Ice Arena • Ann Arbor, MI (Rivalry)	BTN	Mann	T 1–1 ^{(2OT, L)}	5,373	3–4–2 (0–2–1–0)
November 9	7:00 PM	Minnesota		Yost Ice Arena • Ann Arbor, MI (Rivalry)	BTN	Mann	L 1–3	5,800	3–5–2 (0–3–1–0)
November 14	6:30 PM	Michigan State		Yost Ice Arena • Ann Arbor, MI (Rivalry)	BTN	Mann	L 3–4	5,233	3–6–2 (0–4–1–0)
November 16	7:00 PM	at Michigan State		Munn Ice Arena • East Lansing, MI (Rivalry)		Mann	L 0–3	6,552	3–7–2 (0–5–1–0)
November 22	7:00 PM	at New Hampshire*		Whittemore Center • Durham, NH		Mann	W 4–1	5,246	4–7–2
November 23	7:00 PM	at New Hampshire*		Whittemore Center • Durham, NH		Lavigne	L 2–3 ^{OT}	6,038	4–8–2
November 30	7:00 PM	at #19 Wisconsin		Kohl Center • Madison, WI	FSW+	Mann	L 2–3	9,894	4–9–2 (0–6–1–0)
December 1	4:00 PM	at #19 Wisconsin		Kohl Center • Madison, WI	BTN	Mann	W 3–1	9,571	5–9–2 (1–6–1–0)
December 6	8:30 PM	#6 Penn State		Yost Ice Arena • Ann Arbor, MI	FS1	Mann	W 4–1	5,246	6–9–2 (2–6–1–0)
December 7	7:30 PM	#6 Penn State		Yost Ice Arena • Ann Arbor, MI		Mann	L 1–3	5,444	6–10–2 (2–7–1–0)
Great Lakes Invitational
December 30	4:00 PM	vs. Ferris State*		Little Caesars Arena • Detroit, MI (GLI Semifinal)		Mann	W 4–1	16,139	7–10–2
December 31	2:30 PM	vs. Michigan Tech*		Little Caesars Arena • Detroit, MI (GLI)	FSD	Mann	L 2–4		7–11–2
Regular season
January 10	7:00 PM	at #14 Notre Dame		Notre Dame Stadium • Notre Dame, IN (Rivalry)	NBCSN	Mann	W 3–0	4,896	8–11–2 (3–7–1–0)
January 11	6:00 PM	at #14 Notre Dame		Notre Dame Stadium • Notre Dame, IN (Rivalry)		Mann	W 3–1	4,971	9–11–2 (4–7–1–0)
January 17	7:00 PM	at #6 Penn State		Pegula Ice Arena • State College, PA		Mann	W 6–0	6,294	10–11–2 (5–7–1–0)
January 18	6:00 PM	at #6 Penn State		Pegula Ice Arena • State College, PA		Mann	T 4–4 ^{(2OT, W)}	6,278	10–11–3 (5–7–2–1)
January 25	7:30 PM	U.S. NTDP U-18 Team*		Yost Ice Arena • Ann Arbor, MI (Exhibition)		Mann	L 1–4	5,800	–
January 31	7:30 PM	#11 Ohio State		Yost Ice Arena • Ann Arbor, MI (Rivalry)		Mann	W 3–2	5,800	11–11–3 (6–7–2–1)
February 1	7:30 PM	#11 Ohio State		Yost Ice Arena • Ann Arbor, MI (Rivalry)		Mann	L 1–4	5,800	11–12–3 (6–8–2–1)
February 7	6:00 PM	Wisconsin		Yost Ice Arena • Ann Arbor, MI	BTN	Mann	W 8–4	5,800	12–12–3 (7–8–2–1)
February 8	7:30 PM	Wisconsin		Yost Ice Arena • Ann Arbor, MI		Mann	W 5–3	5,800	13–12–3 (8–8–2–1)
February 14	6:00 PM	at Michigan State		Munn Ice Arena • East Lansing, MI (Rivalry)	BTN	Mann	W 5–1	6,796	14–12–3 (9–8–2–1)
February 17	7:00 PM	vs. Michigan State		Little Caesars Arena • Detroit, MI (Duel in the D)	FSD	Mann	W 4–1	8,455	15–12–3 (10–8–2–1)
February 21	6:00 PM	Notre Dame		Yost Ice Arena • Ann Arbor, MI (Rivalry)	BTN	Mann	L 1–2	5,800	15–13–3 (10–9–2–1)
February 22	4:00 PM	Notre Dame		Yost Ice Arena • Ann Arbor, MI (Rivalry)	BTN	Mann	L 0–3	5,800	15–14–3 (10–10–2–1)
February 28	7:30 PM	at #18 Minnesota		Mariucci Arena • Minneapolis, MN (Rivalry)	BTN	Mann	T 2–2 ^{(SO, W)}	8,149	15–14–4 (10–10–3–1)
February 29	5:00 PM	at #18 Minnesota		Mariucci Arena • Minneapolis, MN (Rivalry)	FSN, FSD+	Mann	W 2–1	9,613	16–14–4 (11–10–3–1)
Big Ten Tournament
March 6	7:00 PM	Michigan State		Yost Ice Arena • Ann Arbor, MI		Mann	W 3–0	3,238	17–14–4
March 7	7:00 PM	Michigan State		Yost Ice Arena • Ann Arbor, MI		Mann	W 3–0	4,226	18–14–4
March 14	5:30 PM	at Ohio State		Value City Arena • Columbus, OH	Canceled due to the coronavirus pandemic				
*Non-conference game. ^{#}Rankings from USCHO.com Poll. All times are in Eastern Time. Source:

== Scoring statistics ==
Name	Position	Games	Goals	Assists	Points	PIM
Jake Slaker	C	33	14	17	31	14
Will Lockwood	RW	33	9	14	23	18
Nick Pastujov	LW	36	9	9	18	24
Johnny Beecher	C/LW	31	9	7	16	31
Cam York	D	30	5	11	16	10
Nick Blankenburg	F/D	35	4	12	16	14
Jacob Hayhurst	C	36	8	7	15	2
Jimmy Lambert	RW/C	32	2	11	13	6
Jack Becker	C	32	8	4	12	23
Luke Morgan	LW	36	4	8	12	10
Nick Granowicz	F	21	7	4	11	6
Eric Ciccolini	RW	26	1	10	11	6
Jack Summers	D	36	4	6	10	16
Garrett Van Wyhe	F	36	3	7	10	35
Michael Pastujov	LW	29	3	6	9	12
Dakota Raabe	F	32	1	8	9	10
Luke Martin	D	36	1	8	9	18
Keaton Pehrson	D	35	1	7	8	0
Nolan Moyle	RW	33	3	4	7	8
Emil Öhrwall	LW	15	2	2	4	2
Griffin Luce	D	35	0	4	4	25
Strauss Mann	G	35	0	2	2	0
Shane Switzer	D	2	0	1	1	0
Hayden Lavigne	G	2	0	0	0	0
Jack Olmstead	F	2	0	0	0	0
Adam Winborg	C	4	0	0	0	2
Jake Gingell	D	8	0	0	0	2
Bench	—	—	—	—	—	10
Total			98	169	267	304

== Goaltending statistics ==
Name	Games	Minutes	Wins	Losses	Ties	Goals against	Saves	Shut outs	SV %	GAA
Strauss Mann	35	2071	18	13	4	64	987	6	.939	1.85
Hayden Lavigne	2	87	0	1	0	3	38	0	.921	2.06
Empty Net	—	21	—	—	—	5	—	—	—	—
Total	36	2180	18	14	4	72	1022	6	.934	1.98

== Rankings ==
Poll	Week																							
Poll	Pre	1	2	3	4	5	6	7	8	9	10	11	12	13	14	15	16	17	18	19	20	21	22	23 (Final)
USCHO.com	NR	NR	NR	NR	NR	NR	NR	NR	NR	NR	NR	NR	NR	NR	NR	NR	NR	NR	NR	NR	NR	NR	17	17
USA Today	NR	NR	NR	NR	NR	NR	NR	NR	NR	NR	NR	NR	NR	NR	NR	NR	NR	NR	NR	NR	NR	NR	15	15

== Players drafted into the NHL ==
=== 2020 NHL entry draft ===
Round	Pick	Player	NHL team
1	29	Brendan Brisson†	Vegas Golden Knights
2	38	Thomas Bordeleau†	San Jose Sharks
3	91	Jackson Hallum†	Vegas Golden Knights
4	120	Ethan Edwards†	New Jersey Devils
5	144	Jacob Truscott†	Vancouver Canucks

† incoming freshman
