= 2020 Big Ten men's ice hockey tournament =

- Dates: March 6–21, 2020
- Teams: 7
- Big Ten men's Ice Hockey Tournaments

The 2020 Big Ten Conference Men's Ice Hockey Tournament was the seventh tournament in conference history. It was scheduled to be played between March 6 and March 21, 2020, on-campus locations. On March 12, 2020, the Big Ten announced that the tournament was canceled due to the coronavirus pandemic.

== Format ==
The tournament featured a format with all games taking place on the campus of the higher-seeded teams. The tournament opened with three best-of-three quarterfinal series, as the second, third and fourth-seeded teams each hosting a series. The top-seeded team had a bye to the single-elimination semifinals. The highest-seeded team remaining after the semifinals was intended to host the championship game.

== Conference standings ==
2019–20 Big Ten ice hockey Standings
	Conference record								Overall record					
	GP	W	L	T	3/SW	PTS	GF	GA	GP	W	L	T	GF	GA
#9 Penn State	24	12	8	4	1	41	79	70	34	20	10	4	121	88
#10 Ohio State	24	11	9	4	1	38	62	62	34	18	11	5	91	80
#17 Michigan	24	11	10	3	2	38	65	52	34	16	14	4	92	72
#18 Minnesota	24	9	8	7	4	38	66	62	34	14	13	7	95	94
Notre Dame	24	9	9	6	4	37	59	59	34	14	13	7	90	91
Michigan State	24	11	11	2	0	35	54	54	34	15	17	2	80	82
Wisconsin	24	7	15	2	2	25	63	89	34	14	18	2	110	124
Championship: March 21, 2020 † indicates conference regular season champion * indicates conference tournament champion Rankings: USCHO.com Top 20 Poll; updated March 1, 2020

== Bracket ==
Teams were reseeded for the semifinals

Quarterfinals; March 6–8
2	Ohio State	9	2*	—
7	Wisconsin	1	1	—
3	Michigan	3	3	—
6	Michigan State	0	0	—
4	Minnesota	0	2	3
5	Notre Dame	1	1	2

Semifinals; March 14
1	Penn State
4	Minnesota
2	Ohio State
3	Michigan

Championship; March 21

Note: * denotes overtime periods.

== Results ==
=== Quarterfinals ===
==== (2) Ohio State vs. (7) Wisconsin ====
March 6	Wisconsin	1 – 9	Ohio State	Value City Arena	Recap
No scoring		First period	7:41 – Collin Peters – (Carson Meyer, Grant Gabriele); 11:39 – Carson Meyer – (Tanner Laczynski, Tate Singleton)
No scoring		Second period	1:02 – Carson Meyer – (Tate Singleton); 4:42 – Carson Meyer – (unassisted); 13:54 – pp – Carson Meyer – (unassisted); 17:28 – sh – Quinn Preston – (Ronnie Hine, Matt Miller)
Wyatt Kalynuk – (Dylan Holloway, Ty Emberson) – 12:25		Third period	0:29 – Quinn Preston – (Matt Miller, Austin Pooley); 3:14 – Tanner Laczynski – (Tate Singleton); 12:12 – pp – Wyatt Ege – (Quinn Preston, Austin Pooley)
Jack Berry (10 saves / 14 shots); Daniel Lebedeff (7 saves / 10 shots); Johan Blomquist (6 saves / 8 shots)		Goalie stats	Tommy Nappier (31 saves / 32 shots)

March 7	Wisconsin	1 – 2	OT	Ohio State	Value City Arena	Recap
No scoring		First period		No scoring
Dylan Holloway – (Wyatt Kalynuk, Ty Pelton-Byce) – pp – 14:01		Second period		8:07 – pp – Carson Meyer – (Tanner Laczynski, Quinn Preston)
No scoring		Third period		No scoring
No scoring		First overtime period		1:12 – Jaedon Leslie – (Ronnie Hein, Gustaf Westlund)
Jack Berry (27 saves / 29 shots)		Goalie stats		Tommy Nappier (29 saves / 30 shots)

Ohio State won series 2–0

==== (3) Michigan vs. (6) Michigan State ====
March 6	Michigan State	0 – 3	Michigan	Yost Ice Arena	Recap
No scoring		First period	9:54 – Jake Slaker – pp – (Will Lockwood, Nick Blankenburg)
No scoring		Second period	2:52 – Johnny Beecher – (Jacob Hayhurst, Luke Martin); 19:53 – Nick Pastujov – pp – (Jimmy Lambert)
No scoring		Third period	No scoring
John Lethemon (17 saves / 20 shots)		Goalie stats	Strauss Mann (25 saves / 25 shots)

March 7	Michigan State	0 – 3	Michigan	Yost Ice Arena	Recap
No scoring		First period	No scoring
No scoring		Second period	5:20 – Will Lockwood – pp – (Nick Blankenburg, Jake Slaker); 18:28 – Johnny Beecher – (unassisted)
No scoring		Third period	19:13 – Jake Slaker – (Nick Pastujov)
John Lethemon (23 saves / 26 shots)		Goalie stats	Strauss Mann (20 saves / 20 shots)

Michigan won series 2–0

==== (4) Minnesota vs. (5) Notre Dame ====
March 6	Notre Dame	1 – 0	Minnesota	3M Arena at Mariucci	Recap
No scoring		First period	No scoring
Trevor Janicke – (Colin Theisen, Mike O'Leary) – 16:24		Second period	No scoring
No scoring		Third period	No scoring
Cale Morris (12 saves / 12 shots)		Goalie stats	Jack LaFontaine (25 saves / 26 shots)

March 7	Notre Dame	1 – 2	Minnesota	3M Arena at Mariucci	Recap
No scoring		First period	1:24 – Ryan Zuhlsdorf – (Sammy Walker, Blake McLaughlin)
No scoring		Second period	No scoring
Cam Morrison – (Michael Graham, Alex Steeves) – pp – 10:14		Third period	3:27 – Cullen Munson – (Jonny Sorenson, Joey Marooney)
Cale Morris (18 saves / 20 shots)		Goalie stats	Jack LaFontaine (30 saves / 31 shots)

March 8	Notre Dame	2 – 3	Minnesota	3M Arena at Mariucci	Recap
No scoring		First period	No scoring
Alex Steeves – (Tory Dello) – 5:25		Second period	10:18 – Ben Meyers – pp – (Blake McLaughlin, Robbie Stucker); 11:06 – Sampo Ranta – (Scott Reedy, Brannon McManus); 16:03 – Ben Meyers – pp – (Sammy Walker, Scott Reedy)
Cam Morrison – (Alex Steeves, Spencer Stastney) – pp – 10:36		Third period	No scoring
Cale Morris (18 saves / 21 shots)		Goalie stats	Jack LaFontaine (23 saves / 25 shots)

Minnesota won series 2–1
