= Sammy Walker (ice hockey) =

American ice hockey player (born 1999)

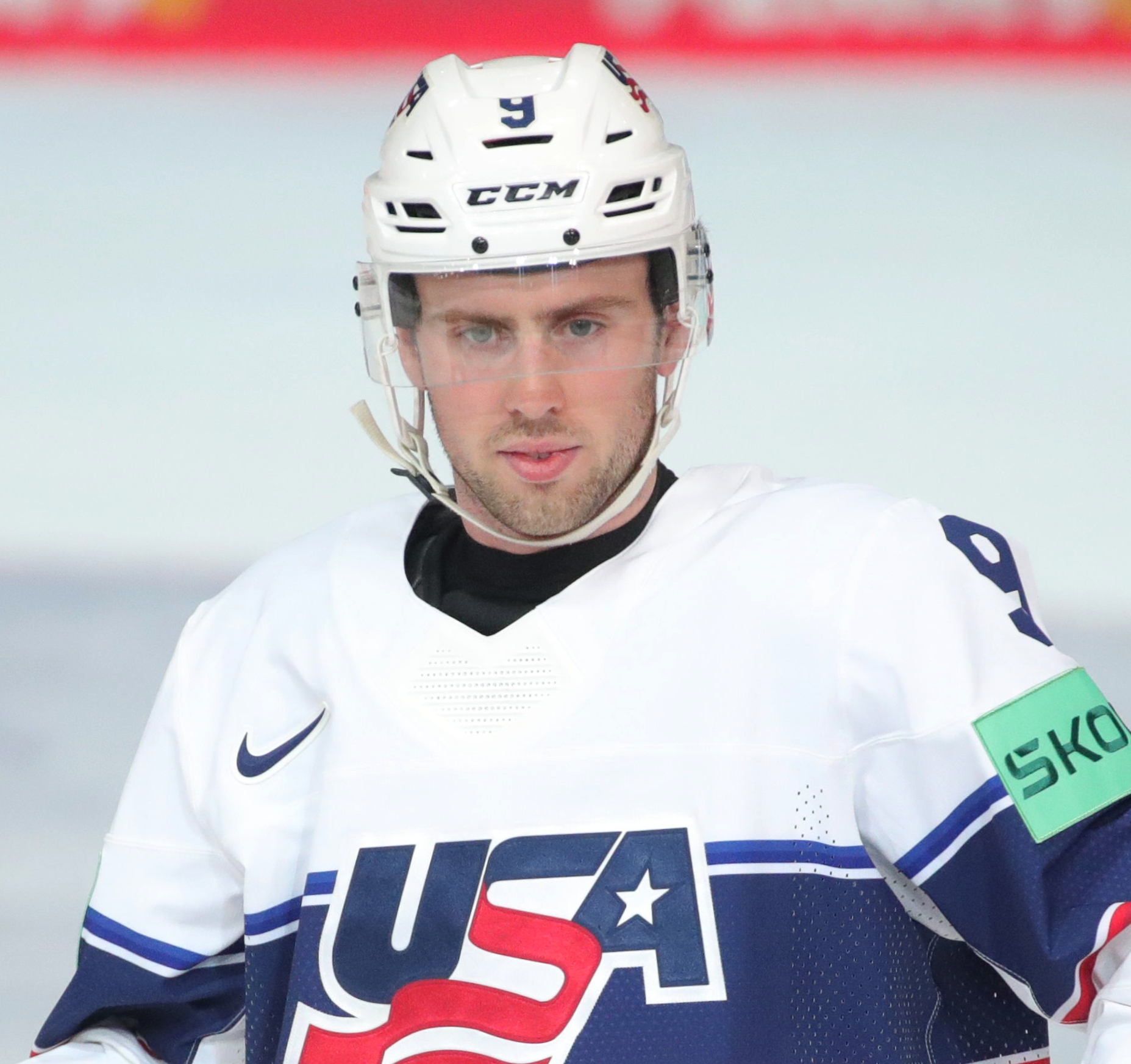
- Walker with Team USA in 2023
- Born: June 7, 1999 (age 27) Edina, Minnesota, U.S.
- Height: 5 ft 10 in (178 cm)
- Weight: 180 lb (82 kg; 12 st 12 lb)
- Position: Forward
- Shoots: Right
- AHL team Former teams: Tucson Roadrunners; Minnesota Wild
- National team: United States
- NHL draft: 200th overall, 2017; Tampa Bay Lightning
- Playing career: 2022–present

Samuel Walker (born June 7, 1999) is an American professional ice hockey forward for the Tucson Roadrunners of the American Hockey League (AHL). He was drafted in the seventh round of the 2017 NHL entry draft by the Tampa Bay Lightning with the 200th overall selection.

== Playing career ==
=== Amateur ===
Walker played for Edina High School for four seasons, finishing with 167 points. Walker was the team captain his senior year. After the 2017–18 season, he won the Minnesota Mr. Hockey Award.

He began his collegiate hockey career for the University of Minnesota during the 2018–19 season. In his full collegiate tenure with the Golden Gophers he became the second (Grant Potulny) three-year captain in school history.

=== Professional ===
After his collegiate career, Walker opted to become a free agent after declining to sign with his draft club, the Tampa Bay Lightning. On August 18, 2022, he opted to sign with his home state team, the Minnesota Wild, agreeing to a two-year, entry-level contract. After attending his first Wild training camp and pre-season, Walker was re-assigned to begin his professional career in the AHL with affiliate the Iowa Wild to open the 2022–23 season.

Walker was recalled from Iowa on December 9, 2022. He scored his first NHL goal on December 27, 2022 in a game versus the Winnipeg Jets on an empty net goal.

During the 2024–25 season, Walker's development within the Wild organization stagnated, producing just 2 goals and 11 points through 30 appearances in the AHL with the Iowa Wild. On February 4, 2025, Walker was traded by the Wild to the Utah Hockey Club in exchange for future considerations.

At the completion of his contract with the Utah Mammoth, Walker opted to remain within the orgnazation, signing as a free agent to a one-year AHL contract to continue with affiliate, the Tucson Roadrunners, on July 6, 2026.

== Career statistics ==
=== Regular season and playoffs ===
			Regular season					Playoffs
Season	Team	League	GP	G	A	Pts	PIM	GP	G	A	Pts	PIM
2014–15	Edina High	MNHS	25	3	3	6	6	2	2	1	3	0
2015–16	Edina High	MNHS	25	19	18	37	14	2	0	1	1	0
2016–17	Edina High	MNHS	25	22	24	46	6	3	2	4	6	0
2016–17	Lincoln Stars	USHL	4	0	0	0	6	—	—	—	—	—
2017–18	Edina High	MNHS	25	28	30	58	12	3	4	6	10	4
2017–18	Sioux City Musketeers	USHL	17	2	7	9	4	—	—	—	—	—
2018–19	University of Minnesota	B1G	37	10	16	26	16	—	—	—	—	—
2019–20	University of Minnesota	B1G	37	11	19	30	33	—	—	—	—	—
2020–21	University of Minnesota	B1G	31	13	16	29	12	—	—	—	—	—
2021–22	University of Minnesota	B1G	38	14	13	27	20	—	—	—	—	—
2022–23	Iowa Wild	AHL	56	27	21	48	23	1	0	1	1	0
2022–23	Minnesota Wild	NHL	9	1	1	2	0	—	—	—	—	—
2023–24	Iowa Wild	AHL	70	14	31	45	24	—	—	—	—	—
2023–24	Minnesota Wild	NHL	4	0	0	0	0	—	—	—	—	—
2024–25	Iowa Wild	AHL	30	2	9	11	23	—	—	—	—	—
2024–25	Tucson Roadrunners	AHL	31	8	14	22	8	3	0	0	0	0
2025–26	Tucson Roadrunners	AHL	57	12	16	28	16	—	—	—	—	—
NHL totals			13	1	1	2	0	—	—	—	—	—

=== International ===
Year	Team	Event	Result	GP	G	A	Pts	PIM
2023	United States	WC	4th	1	0	0	0	0
Senior totals				1	0	0	0	0

== Awards and honors ==
Award	Year	Ref
College
Big Ten Freshman of the Year	2019	
Big Ten Freshmen Team	2019	
Frank Pond Rookie of the Year	2019	
Preseason All-Big Ten Second Team	2019	
All-Big Ten Honorable Mention	2020	
John Mariucci Most Valuable Player	2020	
All-Big Ten Academic Team	2020	
Honorable Mention All-Big Ten Team	2021	
Big Ten All-Tournament Team	2021	
AHCA All-American Scholar	2021	
Big Ten Distinguished Scholar	2021	
Academic All-Big Ten Team	2021	
Preseason All-Big Ten First Team	2022	
Honorable Mention All-Big Ten Team	2022	
Big Ten Sportsmanship Award	2022	
Senior CLASS Award First Team	2022	

Awards and achievements
Preceded by Casey Mittelstadt	Minnesota Mr. Hockey; 2018	Succeeded by Bryce Brodzinski
Preceded by Mitchell Lewandowski	Big Ten Freshman of the Year; 2018–19	Succeeded by Cole Caufield
