= Central Illinois Flying Aces =

Junior hockey team in Bloomington, Illinois

- City: Bloomington, Illinois
- League: United States Hockey League
- Founded: 2014
- Folded: 2019
- Home arena: Grossinger Motors Arena
- Colors: Red, navy, light blue, white
- Owner: CSH International Inc.
- General manager: Mike Watt
- Head coach: Mike Watt
- Media: WJBC-FM (93.7 FM)

Franchise history
- 2014–2017: Bloomington Thunder
- 2017–2019: Central Illinois Flying Aces

The Central Illinois Flying Aces were a Tier I junior hockey team that played as a member of the United States Hockey League. Based in Bloomington, Illinois, the Flying Aces played their home games at the Grossinger Motors Arena, located in downtown Bloomington. In the Flying Aces history they only had amounted to 38 wins and 72 losses in the two seasons as the Flying Aces. As the teams original name the Bloomington Thunder they had amounted to 100 wins in the teams three years in the United States Hockey League they had lost 69 games. In the thunders second year in the United States Hockey League they made the playoffs and won in the first round against the Cedar Rapids RoughRiders who were a Top seeded team in the east beating them in 5 games, then the thunder had to face the Dubuque Fighting Saints the fighting saints took the series 3-2 in a 5 game series. Despite the Flying Aces not being affiliated with the Bloomington Bison of the East Coast Hockey League hockey returned to Bloomington but instead with ties with the National Hockey League. The arena the Central Illinois Flying Aces and Bloomington Thunder had played in Grossinger Motors Arena is still up and running in downtown Bloomington but doesn’t have a name for the venue which expired in June 2022 and the City Leaders of Bloomington have been working hard to get naming rights on the arena.

== History ==
From 2006 to 2014, Bloomington was home to various minor league professional hockey teams in the International Hockey League (IHL), Central Hockey League (CHL) and then the Southern Professional Hockey League (SPHL). The SPHL's Bloomington Thunder folded in April 2014 when new owners obtained the expansion rights to a Tier I junior team in the United States Hockey League. The new Bloomington USHL team obtained the rights to the name from the previous teams and became the Bloomington Thunder. Initially they kept the SPHL team's logo but rolled out a new logo and color scheme at the USHL Draft.

In 2017, the team rebranded and became the Central Illinois Flying Aces. On February 28, 2019, the Flying Aces announced they will suspend operations for at least the 2019–20 season.

== Logo history ==
Bloomington Thunder primary logo

Bloomington Thunder alternate logo

== See also ==
- Bloomington Thunder (SPHL)
