= Compton Family Ice Arena =

Ice facility in Notre Dame, Indiana

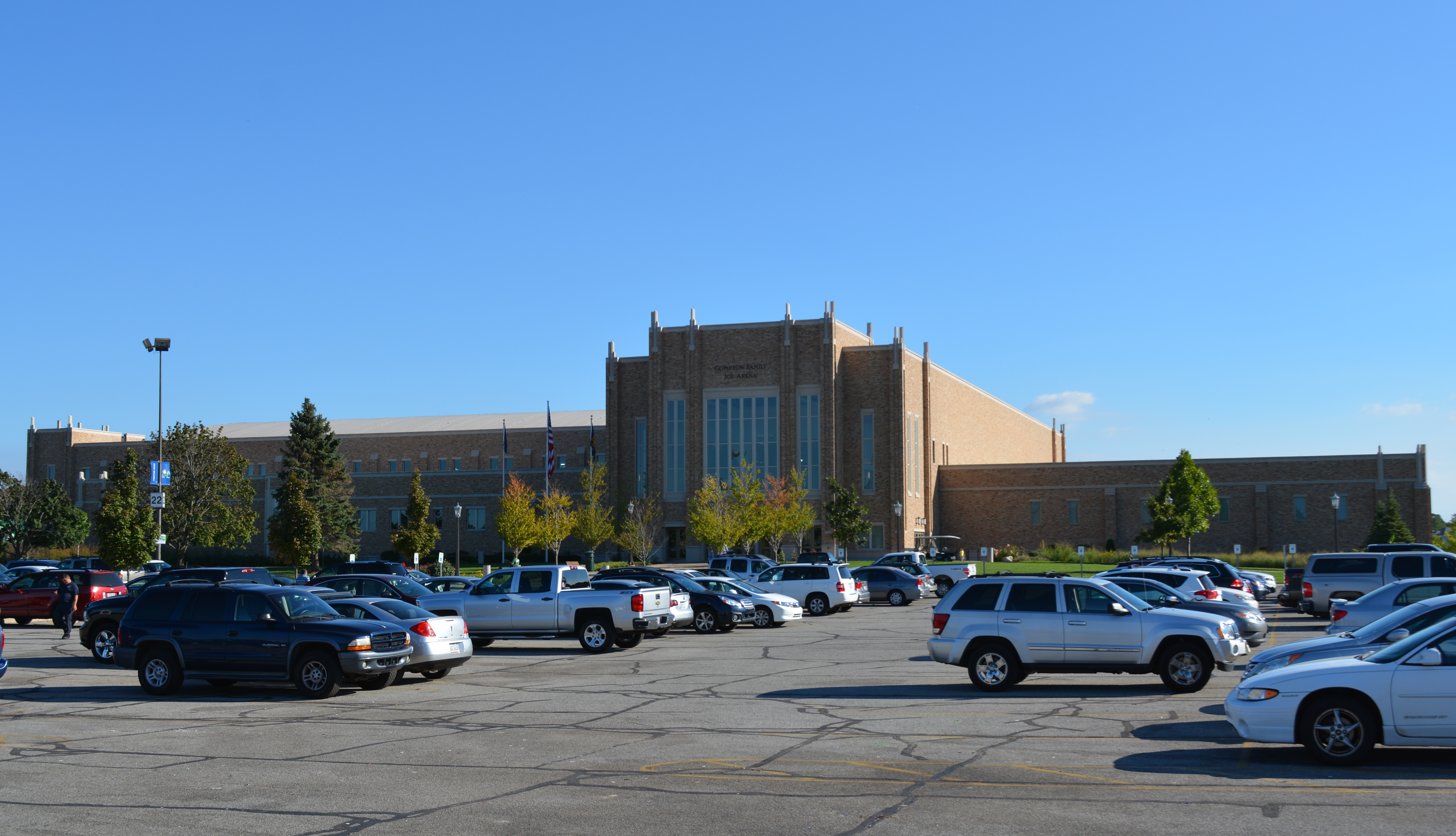
- Interactive map of Compton Family Ice Arena
- Full name: Compton Family Ice Arena
- Location: Notre Dame, Indiana
- Coordinates: 41.693769°N 86.230876°W
- Owner: University of Notre Dame
- Operator: University of Notre Dame
- Capacity: 5,022
- Executive suites: 4
- Surface: Ice
- Record attendance: 5,988
- Field size: 200' x 95' (ice hockey); 2 x 100' x 100 (ice hockey)

Construction
- Groundbreaking: September 11, 2010; 16 years ago
- Built: March 15, 2010 - October 2011
- Opened: October 18, 2011; 15 years ago
- Cost: $50 million
- Architect: Rossetti
- General contractor: Barton Malow

Tenants
- Notre Dame Fighting Irish men's ice hockey Irish Youth Hockey League; Chicago Blackhawks Training Camp (2013–2015)

Website
- link

The Compton Family Ice Arena is a 5,022-seat, two-rink ice facility in Notre Dame, Indiana on the campus of the University of Notre Dame. The arena saw its first game on October 21, 2011. The ice arena replaced the 2,857-seat rink in the north dome of the Edmund P. Joyce Center.

It is named in honor of former San Jose Sharks part-owners Kevin and Gayla Compton, whose gift led funding for the project.

The new ice arena is located south of the Joyce Center, just north of Edison Road, and just west of the Harris Family Track and Field facility. The majority of the general public arena seating is of the chair-back variety. The facility includes two sheets of ice (one of them Olympic-sized), with limited seating availability for the second sheet. Offices, locker room, and training facilities for the Notre Dame hockey program are located within the facility. The weight room within the building is available for use by all Fighting Irish varsity athletes. Eight auxiliary locker rooms are available for campus and community use of the facility.

== History ==
On February 12, 2009, the University of Notre Dame announced it would begin construction the next year on a new, freestanding, on-campus ice arena designed to meet the needs of both the nationally ranked Irish men's hockey team and the local community. Construction began on March 15, 2010, on the 5,022-seat arena, which opened on schedule on October 18, 2011.

The university originally had planned to renovate the current Joyce Center ice facility, but additional studies changed that plan to instead feature a new building. With the completion of the new arena, the ice plant was removed from the Joyce Center's north dome, making its space available for a variety of other events.

== Charles W. "Lefty" Smith Jr. Rink ==
The main ice arena features a 200' x 90' ice rink. The facility is named the Charles W. "Lefty" Smith Jr. Rink, in honor of the first coach in the program's history.
