= Carson Meyer =

American ice hockey player (born 1997)

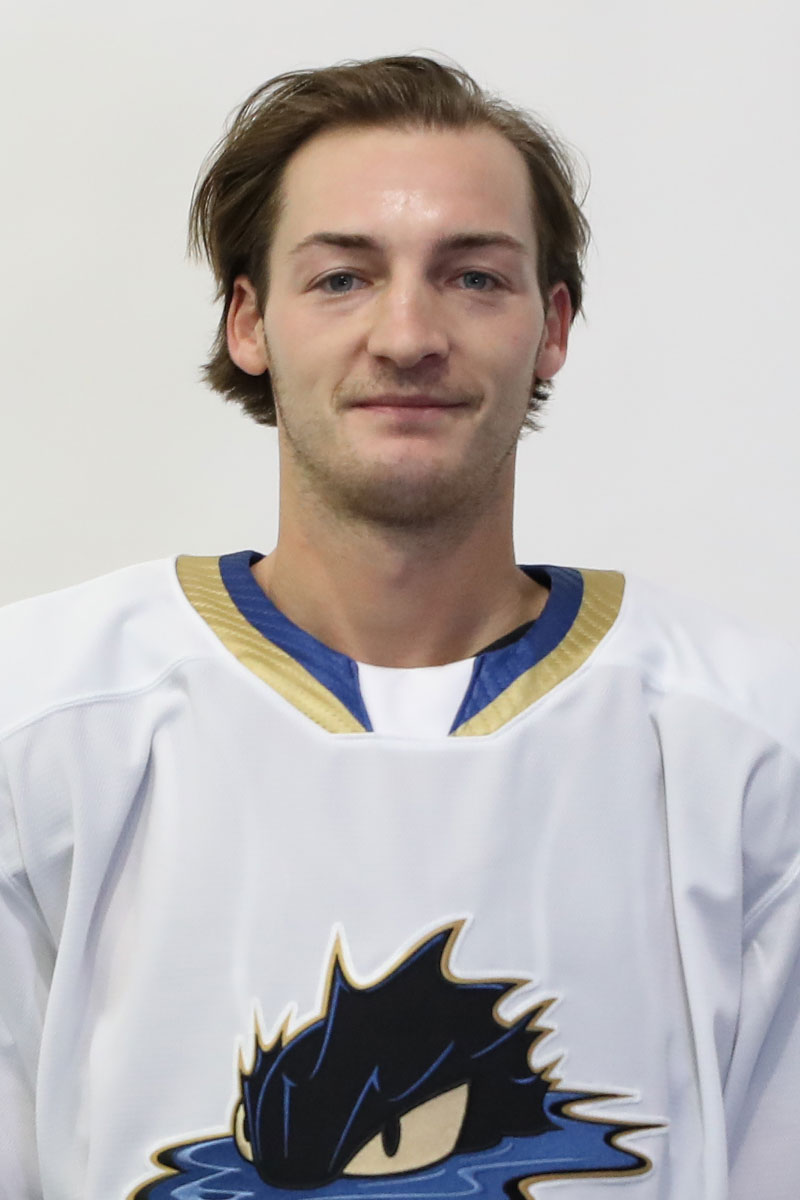
- Meyer with the Cleveland Monsters
- Born: August 18, 1997 (age 28) Powell, Ohio, U.S.
- Height: 5 ft 11 in (180 cm)
- Weight: 184 lb (83 kg; 13 st 2 lb)
- Position: Right wing
- Shoots: Right
- NHL team (P) Cur. team Former teams: Buffalo Sabres; Rochester Americans (AHL); Columbus Blue Jackets
- NHL draft: 179th overall, 2017; Columbus Blue Jackets
- Playing career: 2021–present

Carson Meyer (born August 18, 1997) is an American professional ice hockey right winger for the Rochester Americans of the American Hockey League (AHL) while under contract to the Buffalo Sabres of the National Hockey League (NHL). The Columbus Blue Jackets selected him in the sixth round, 179th overall, of the 2017 NHL entry draft. He previously played college ice hockey for the Miami RedHawks and Ohio State Buckeyes.

== Early life ==
Meyer was born on August 18, 1997, in Powell, Ohio, to Todd and Holly Meyer. When he was three years old, the Columbus Blue Jackets joined the National Hockey League (NHL), which inspired Meyer to pick up ice hockey. He played one season of lacrosse at Olentangy Liberty High School but quit the sport to focus on hockey. Beginning at the age of 14, Meyer played in the Tier 1 Elite Hockey League for the Ohio AAA Blue Jackets. Playing on a forward line with future NHL players Jack Roslovic and Kole Sherwood, Meyer scored 21 goals and recorded 30 assists for a total of 51 points in 32 games during the 2014–15 season. In 2010, Meyer participated in the Quebec International Pee-Wee Hockey Tournament with the AAA Blue Jackets.

After completing his final season of Tier 1 ice hockey with the AAA Blue Jackets, Meyer joined the Tri-City Storm of the United States Hockey League for two games at the end of the 2014–15 season. He then scored 32 goals and 51 points with the Storm during the 2015–16 season, adding an additional five goals and 11 points in 11 postseason games to help his team win the Clark Cup. In 2016, Meyer and Wade Allison of the Storm were selected to play in the USHL/NHL Top Prospects Game. In two USHL seasons, Meyer had 32 goals, 20 assists, 52 points, and 47 penalty minutes in 58 appearances.

== Playing career ==
=== College ===
While he was playing with the Storm, Meyer committed to attend Miami University and play college ice hockey for the RedHawks beginning in the 2016–17 season. He scored his first collegiate hockey goal on October 8, 2016, in a 2–1 victory over Providence. After missing four games in November, Meyer went on a six-game point streak. He was an offensive boon for Miami during his first season: his 26 points (10 goals and 16 assists) were fourth on the team, and he recorded at least one point in 21 of 32 games. Minnesota Duluth swept Miami in the opening round of the 2017 NCHC Tournament, with Meyer scoring in Game 1 of the best-of-three series. At the end of the season, Meyer was named to the NCHC Academic All-Conference Team. That June, Meyer's hometown team, the Columbus Blue Jackets, selected him in the sixth round, 179th overall, of the 2017 NHL entry draft.

After providing many offensive opportunities for Miami during the 2016–17 season, Meyer and his teammate Kiefer Sherwood took a step back during the 2017–18 season: despite a three-game point streak from Meyer at the end of November, the pair had only 13 points combined through the first half of the season. Meyer did not record his first multi-point game of the season until January 27, when he scored two goals and notched an assist against Colorado College. His poor performance, in which he had only six goals and ten points while recording 48 penalty minutes and a −22 plus-minus rating, was initially blamed on a sophomore slump. Throughout the season, Meyer had suffered from a loss of appetite, fatigue, and frequent nausea and malnourishment, all of which negatively impacted his athletic performance. He was unaware of the cause until he passed a tapeworm in February, which doctors attributed to eating undercooked fish. Despite dealing with the parasite for the better part of the season, Meyer was once again named an NCHC Academic All-Conference selection.

Meyer's experience with the parasite caused issues with the coaching staff at Miami, particularly with head coach Enrico Blasi, and Meyer transferred to Ohio State University to begin playing with the Buckeyes for the 2018–19 season. To avoid missing a season due to the NCAA's transfer rules, Meyer's family filed a waiver with the association asking that his medical issues exempt him from the one-year penalty. Blasi was given the final say, and he agreed to allow Meyer to play for Ohio State without delay. Meyer had a goal and an assist in his first game with the Buckeyes, a 3–2 win over Arizona State on October 12. Playing on the top two offensive lines and on the power play unit, Meyer's 22 points in 34 games were third on the team, while Ohio State won its first-ever regular-season Big Ten Conference championship in 2018–19. The Buckeyes were eliminated in the 2019 Big Ten Men's Ice Hockey Tournament by Penn State, but they earned a bid in the 2019 NCAA Division I Men's Ice Hockey Tournament, where they lost to Denver in the West Regional finals.

Meyer returned to Ohio State for the 2019–20 season. By the end of January, he was third on the team with nine goals and 19 points in 25 games, including a stretch of four goals and seven points in the Buckeyes' first seven games back from their Christmas break. He finished the regular season first on the team with 17 goals and second with 14 assists and 31 points, career highs on all fronts. The Buckeyes faced the Wisconsin Badgers in the opening round of the 2020 Big Ten Men's Ice Hockey Tournament, and Meyer scored four goals and five points in the 9–1 OSU victory. It was the first hat-trick of his college career and the first four-goal game of any Buckeye since 1992. His senior season came to a premature end with the tournament cancellations caused by the COVID-19 pandemic, but Meyer finished his collegiate career with 42 goals and 89 points in 137 games, including 26 goals and 53 points in 71 games for Ohio State.

=== Professional ===
==== Columbus Blue Jackets (2021–2024) ====
On October 22, 2020, Meyer, whose draft rights with the Blue Jackets expired shortly after his college graduation, signed a one-year contract with the Cleveland Monsters, the Blue Jackets' American Hockey League (AHL) affiliate. The continued effects of the COVID-19 pandemic meant that Meyer did not begin his professional hockey career until February 2021, the start of the Monsters' 2020–21 season. He made his AHL debut on February 22, scoring two goals in Cleveland's 7–3 win over the Rockford IceHogs. Midway through the season, the Blue Jackets signed Meyer to a one-year, entry-level contract for the 2021–22 season. He finished his first professional season with nine goals and 20 points in 26 games, including a nine-game midseason point streak. His scoring tapered off at the end, however, with only four points in his last nine games. Meyer and the Monsters did not participate in the Calder Cup playoffs due to continued COVID-19 heath and safety protocols.

After participating in the Blue Jackets' preseason, Meyer was assigned to the Monsters to begin the 2021–22 season. Meyer was recalled to Columbus on an emergency basis on February 9 as a replacement for Patrik Laine, who was suffering from a hand and wrist injury. Laine ended up playing in that night's game, and Meyer returned to Cleveland without having made his NHL debut. After scoring 16 goals and 27 points in 57 AHL games, Meyer was promoted again on April 3, and he made his NHL debut the following night, playing in the Blue Jackets' 4–3 overtime loss to the Boston Bruins. On April 5, Meyer picked up his first NHL goal and assist in a 4–2 win over the Philadelphia Flyers, bringing Columbus's seven-game losing streak to an end.

==== Anaheim Ducks (2024–2025) ====
On July 3, 2024, Meyer left the Blue Jackets as a free agent, having signed a one-year, $775k contract with the Anaheim Ducks. Meyer was placed on waivers during Anaheim's 2024 training camp and after going unclaimed, assigned to the Ducks AHL affiliate, the San Diego Gulls to begin the 2024–25 season. Meyer was limited to just 29 regular season games through injury with the Gulls, however was still an offensive threat in posting 9 goals and 21 points.

==== Buffalo Sabres (2025–present) ====
Concluding his contract with the Ducks, Meyer was signed as a free agent to a two-year, two-way contract with the Buffalo Sabres on July 1, 2025.

== International play ==
Medal record

Ice hockey

Representing United States

World Junior A Challenge
Bronze medal – third place	2015 Ontario	

Meyer was one of three members of the Tri-City Storm selected to represent the USHL at the 2015 World Junior A Challenge in Ontario. He scored in the opening game of the tournament, a 6–0 shutout rout of the Czech Republic, and Team USA took the bronze medal with a 7–1 win over Canada East.

== Personal life ==
Meyer graduated from Ohio State in 2020 with a bachelor's degree in sport industry and a minor in real estate. His sister Hayley is a middle school teacher.

== Career statistics ==
=== Regular season and playoffs ===
			Regular season					Playoffs
Season	Team	League	GP	G	A	Pts	PIM	GP	G	A	Pts	PIM
2011–12	Ohio Blue Jackets	T1EHL 14U	24	5	22	27	0	—	—	—	—	—
2012–13	Ohio Blue Jackets	T1EHL 16U	40	10	10	20	4	—	—	—	—	—
2013–14	Ohio Blue Jackets	T1EHL 16U	36	14	19	33	18	—	—	—	—	—
2014–15	Ohio Blue Jackets	T1EHL 16U	32	21	30	51	45	4	2	7	9	0
2014–15	Tri-City Storm	USHL	2	0	1	1	0	—	—	—	—	—
2015–16	Tri-City Storm	USHL	56	32	19	51	47	11	5	6	11	4
2016–17	Miami University	NCHC	32	10	16	26	14	—	—	—	—	—
2017–18	Miami University	NCHC	34	6	4	10	48	—	—	—	—	—
2018–19	Ohio State University	B1G	36	9	13	22	26	—	—	—	—	—
2019–20	Ohio State University	B1G	35	17	14	31	26	—	—	—	—	—
2020–21	Cleveland Monsters	AHL	26	9	11	20	13	—	—	—	—	—
2021–22	Cleveland Monsters	AHL	57	16	11	27	63	—	—	—	—	—
2021–22	Columbus Blue Jackets	NHL	13	1	2	3	6	—	—	—	—	—
2022–23	Cleveland Monsters	AHL	34	9	17	26	36	—	—	—	—	—
2022–23	Columbus Blue Jackets	NHL	14	0	1	1	6	—	—	—	—	—
2023–24	Cleveland Monsters	AHL	55	22	15	37	65	—	—	—	—	—
2023–24	Columbus Blue Jackets	NHL	14	1	1	2	2	—	—	—	—	—
2024–25	San Diego Gulls	AHL	29	9	12	21	20	—	—	—	—	—
2025–26	Rochester Americans	AHL	55	14	17	31	24	3	1	0	1	18
NHL totals			41	2	4	6	14	—	—	—	—	—

=== International ===
Year	Team	Event	Result	GP	G	A	Pts	PIM
2015	United States	WJAC	3rd place, bronze medalist(s)	5	1	1	2	0
Junior totals				5	1	1	2	0
