= Brian Chase (basketball) =

American basketball player (born 1981)

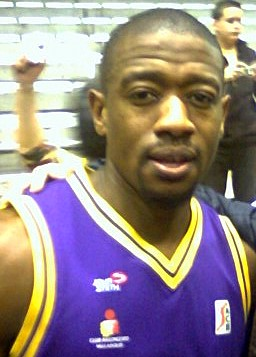

Personal information
- Born: October 8, 1981 (age 45) Washington, D.C.
- Listed height: 5 ft 10 in (1.78 m)
- Listed weight: 176 lb (80 kg)

Career information
- High school: Dunbar (Washington, D.C.)
- College: Virginia Tech (1999–2003)
- NBA draft: 2003: undrafted
- Playing career: 2004–2016
- Position: Point guard

Career history
- 2004–2005: Maryland Nighthawks
- 2005–2006: Gary Steelheads
- 2006: Roanoke Dazzle
- 2006: Nebraska Cranes
- 2006–2008: Los Angeles D-Fenders
- 2008: Beşiktaş
- 2008–2009: Le Mans Sarthe
- 2009: Dynamo Moscow
- 2009–2010: Valladolid
- 2010–2011: Igokea
- 2011: Cibona
- 2012: Enisey Krasnoyarsk
- 2013–2014: Vanoli Cremona
- 2015: Eisbären Bremerhaven
- 2015–2016: Olimpia Basket Matera

Career highlights
- NBDL All-Star (2007); Liga ACB Free Throw Percentage leader (2010)

Brian Matthew Chase (born October 8, 1981) is an American professional basketball player who last played for Olimpia Basket Matera of the Serie A2 Basket.

== College career ==
Chase played college basketball at Virginia Tech from 1999 to 2003. He averaged 10.9 points, 2.8 rebounds and 1.9 assists per game during his four-year stint with the Virginia Tech Hokies.

== Professional career ==
Chase went undrafted in the 2003 NBA draft. In the 2004–05 season, he joined the American Basketball Association (ABA) team Maryland Nighthawks, where he averaged 18.4 points, 3.6 rebounds and 2.3 assists per game in 13 matches. He began the 2005–06 season with the Gary Steelheads of the Continental Basketball Association (CBA). He then moved to the NBA D-League team Roanoke Dazzle in March 2006. He finished the season with the Nebraska Cranes of the United States Basketball League (USBL). In the 2006–07 season, he signed by the Utah Jazz, but was released during the regular season. Afterward, he joined the Los Angeles D-Fenders, where he averaged 16.2 points, 4 rebounds and 3.8 assists during that season. He was also selected to the NBA D-League All-Star Game.

Before the 2007–08 NBA season, Chase signed with the Miami Heat. However, he moved back to play with the D-Fenders. In March 2008, Chase's transfer to the Turkish Basketball League club Beşiktaş Cola Turka was confirmed.

In the 2008–09 season, Chase continued his European career playing in France for Le Mans Sarthe Basket where he averaged 13.3 points, 3.3 rebounds and 3.2 assists per game in the French Pro A and 12.4 points, 2.9 rebounds and 2.4 assists in 10 matches of the Euroleague. In February 2009, he moved to BC Dynamo Moscow of Russia, and averaged 18.8 points, 4.3 rebounds and 1.3 assists while playing in 4 matches of the Eurocup.

Chase spent entire 2009–10 season in Spain, playing for CB Valladolid and averaged 10.5 points, 1.7 rebounds and 1.2 assists per game.

At the start of the 2010–11 season, he moved to Bosnia and Herzegovina and signed one-year deal with KK Igokea. In January 2013, he signed with Vanoli Cremona in Italy.

On January 24, 2015, he signed with Eisbären Bremerhaven of the Basketball Bundesliga.
