= 2015–16 USHL season =

2015–16 USHL Season
- League: United States Hockey League
- Sport: Ice hockey
- Duration: September 25, 2015 – April 10, 2016
- Games: 60
- Teams: 17

Draft
- Top draft pick: Christian Evers
- Picked by: Lincoln Stars

Regular season
- Anderson Cup: Cedar Rapids RoughRiders
- Season MVP: Rem Pitlick (Muskegon Lumberjacks)
- Top scorer: Rem Pitlick (Muskegon Lumberjacks)

Clark Cup Playoffs
- Clark Cup Playoffs MVP: Wade Allison (Storm)
- Finals champions: Tri-City Storm
- Runners-up: Dubuque Fighting Saints

USHL seasons
- 2014–15 2016–17

The 2015–16 USHL season is the 37th season of the United States Hockey League as an all-junior league. The regular season ran from September 25, 2015, to April 10, 2016. The regular season champions, the Cedar Rapids RoughRiders, were awarded the Anderson Cup and the playoff champions, the Tri-City Storm, were awarded the Clark Cup.

== Regular season ==
Final standings

=== Eastern Conference ===
Team	GP	W	L	OTL	SOL	PTS	GF	GA	PIM
z – Cedar Rapids RoughRiders	60	40	15	3	2	85	198	150	876
x – Green Bay Gamblers	60	37	16	4	3	81	191	135	881
x – Dubuque Fighting Saints	60	39	19	1	1	80	209	159	1082
x - Bloomington Thunder	60	36	18	5	1	78	176	152	752
Youngstown Phantoms	60	31	20	4	5	71	192	177	1020
Chicago Steel	60	27	26	4	3	61	168	168	1035
Muskegon Lumberjacks	60	27	26	3	4	61	189	217	986
Madison Capitols	60	25	27	5	3	58	169	198	892
Team USA	60	22	30	5	2	51	172	219	818

=== Western Conference ===
Team	GP	W	L	OTL	SOL	PTS	GF	GA	PIM
y – Tri-City Storm	60	28	15	10	7	73	183	164	726
x – Lincoln Stars	60	33	24	2	1	69	177	163	1152
x – Waterloo Black Hawks	60	31	24	2	3	67	198	183	919
x – Sioux Falls Stampede	60	31	25	3	1	66	164	174	908
Fargo Force (Note: The Fargo Force had more total wins (regulation, overtime, and shootout wins) than the Sioux Falls Stampede, but the Stampede win the playoff tiebreaker (29 regulation and overtime wins to the Force's 28).)	60	32	26	2	0	66	157	150	995
Omaha Lancers	60	26	29	4	1	57	157	189	1034
Des Moines Buccaneers	60	25	30	5	0	55	165	205	957
Sioux City Musketeers	60	20	39	1	0	41	148	210	929

x = clinched playoff berth; y = clinched conference title; z = clinched regular season title

== Statistical leaders ==
=== Scoring leaders ===
Players are listed by points, then goals.

Note: GP = Games played; G = Goals; A = Assists; Pts. = Points; PIM = Penalty minutes

Player	Team	GP	G	A	Pts	PIM
Rem Pitlick	Muskegon Lumberjacks	56	46	43	89	74
Ross Colton	Cedar Rapids RoughRiders	55	35	31	66	79
Cam Morrison	Youngstown Phantoms	60	34	32	66	42
Tanner Laczynski	Chicago/Lincoln	52	24	39	63	38
Denis Smirnov	Fargo Force	60	29	32	61	37
Collin Adams	Muskegon Lumberjacks	59	27	34	61	37
Nate Sucese	Dubuque Fighting Saints	60	26	33	59	28
Sam McCormick	Madison/Waterloo	61	32	25	57	16
Ryan Lohin	Madison/Waterloo	62	23	34	57	54
Ludvig Hoff	Lincoln Stars	56	20	37	57	35

=== Leading goaltenders ===
These are the goaltenders that lead the league in GAA that have played at least 1380 minutes.

Note: GP = Games played; Mins = Minutes played; W = Wins; L = Losses; OTL = Overtime losses; SOL = Shootout losses; SO = Shutouts; GAA = Goals against average; SV% = Save percentage

Player	Team	GP	Mins	W	L	OTL	SOL	SO	GAA	SV%
Adam Húska	Green Bay Gamblers	37	2138	26	9	2	0	4	1.82	0.931
Ben Blacker	Cedar Rapids RoughRiders	50	2967	33	13	2	2	5	2.24	0.926
Hayden Lavigne	Bloomington Thunder	39	2231	26	9	1	1	4	2.26	0.914
Ryan Wischow	Fargo Force	53	2827	24	22	1	0	5	2.29	0.917
Daniel Vladař	Chicago Steel	30	1766	12	12	1	3	3	2.31	0.920

== Post season awards ==
=== All-USHL First Team ===
Pos	Name	Team
G	Adam Húska	Green Bay
D	Jack Ahcan	Cedar Rapids
D	Jérémy Davies	Bloomington
F	Ross Colton	Cedar Rapids
F	Cam Morrison	Youngstown
F	Rem Pitlick	Muskegon

=== All-USHL Second Team ===
Pos	Name	Team
G	Ben Blacker	Cedar Rapids
D	Mattias Gorannson	Tri-City
D	Trevor Hamilton	Lincoln
F	Tanner Laczynski	Lincoln
F	Denis Smirnov	Fargo
F	Nate Sucese	Dubuque

=== All Rookie Team ===
Pos	Name	Team
G	Ryan Edquist	Madison
D	Jacob Bryson	Omaha
D	Andrew Peeke	Green Bay
F	Collin Adams	Muskegon
F	Cam Morrison	Youngstown
F	Eeli Tolvanen	Sioux City

== Clark Cup playoffs ==
Conference Semi-Finals (Best of 5)
1	Cedar Rapids	2
4	Bloomington	3
Eastern Conference
3	Dubuque	3
2	Green Bay	1
2	Lincoln	1
3	Waterloo	3
Western Conference
4	Sioux Falls	0
1	Tri-City	3

Conference Finals (Best of 5)
4	Bloomington	2
3	Dubuque	3
3	Waterloo	2
1	Tri-City	3

Clark Cup Championship (Best of 5)
E3	Dubuque	0
W1	Tri-City	3

== Conference Semi-Finals ==
=== Eastern Conference ===
==== (1) Cedar Rapids RoughRiders vs. (4) Bloomington Thunder ====
April 15	Cedar Rapids RoughRiders	7 – 3	Bloomington Thunder	ImOn Ice Arena
11:03 - Matt Filipe (1); 11:38 - John Snodgrass (1)		First period	No scoring
1:23 - Luke Morgan (1); 6:46 - Pavel Tkachkov (1); 13:57 - Jacob Hayhurst (1); 17:29 - Callahan Burke (1)		Second period	No scoring
7:50 - pp - Pavel Tkachkov (2)		Third period	Logan Lambdin (1) - 1:47; Patrick Curry (1) - pp - 10:12; Tarek Baker (1) - pp - 18:26
Ben Blacker (27 saves / 30 shots)		Goalie stats	Hayden Lavigne (18 saves / 22 shots); Logan Halladay (11 saves / 14 shots)

April 16	Cedar Rapids RoughRiders	2 – 7	Bloomington Thunder	ImOn Ice Arena
13:56 - Jack Ahcan (1)		First period	Logan Lambdin (2) - pp - 6:51; Jake Durflinger (1) - pp - 13:11
No scoring		Second period	Alec Mehr (1) - 3:50; Jake Durflinger (2) - 10:29; Jake Slaker (1) - 13:15; Ethan Somoza (1) - 16:17
15:34 - pp - Callahan Burke (2)		Third period	Jake Slaker (2) - pp - 8:10
Ben Blacker (21 saves / 27 shots); Zack LaRocque (12 saves / 13 shots)		Goalie stats	Hayden Lavigne (26 saves / 28 shots)

April 22	Bloomington Thunder	1 – 3	Cedar Rapids RoughRiders	U.S. Cellular Coliseum
16:35 - pp - Brogan Rafferty (1)		First period	Mitch Reinke (1) - 17:36
No scoring		Second period	Callahan Burke (3) - 11:08
No scoring		Third period	Ross Colton (1) - en - 19:46
Hayden Lavigne (21 saves / 23 shots)		Goalie stats	Ben Blacker (28 saves / 29 shots)

April 24	Bloomington Thunder	1 – 0	OT	Cedar Rapids RoughRiders	U.S. Cellular Coliseum
No scoring		First period		No scoring
No scoring		Second period		No scoring
No scoring		Third period		No scoring
1:22 - Alec Mehr (2)		First overtime period		No scoring
Hayden Lavigne (21 saves / 21 shots)		Goalie stats		Ben Blacker (38 saves / 39 shots)

April 26	Cedar Rapids RoughRiders	2 – 5	Bloomington Thunder	ImOn Ice Arena
No scoring		First period	Logan Lambdin (3) - 3:48
0:53 - Will Garin (1)		Second period	No scoring
12:07 - Zac Robbins (1)		Third period	Sean Harrison (1) - 7:44; Brogan Rafferty (2) - 14:41; Jake Slaker (3) - en - 18:47; Logan Lambdin (4) - en - 19:01
Ben Blacker (38 saves / 41 shots)		Goalie stats	Hayden Lavigne (29 saves / 31 shots)

Bloomington wins series 3 – 2

==== (2) Green Bay Gamblers vs. (3) Dubuque Fighting Saints ====
April 17	Green Bay Gamblers	3 – 2	Dubuque Fighting Saints	Resch Center
No scoring		First period	No scoring
0:12 - Joey Marooney (1)		Second period	No scoring
3:24 - Ryan Blankemeier (1); 14:37 - pp - Sam Saliba (1)		Third period	Petter Mäkitalo (1) - 3:48; Mitchell Smith (1) - 8:51
Adam Húska (29 saves / 31 shots)		Goalie stats	Hunter Miska (22 saves / 25 shots)

April 18	Green Bay Gamblers	2 – 3	OT	Dubuque Fighting Saints	Resch Center
16:57 - Marc Michaelis (1)		First period		No scoring
5:46 - Ryan Blankemeier (2)		Second period		Willie Knierim (1) - pp - 18:09
No scoring		Third period		Petter Mäkitalo (2) - 0:49
No scoring		First overtime period		Dallas Gerads (1) - pp - 15:02
Adam Húska (33 saves / 36 shots)		Goalie stats		Hunter Miska (35 saves / 37 shots)

April 22	Dubuque Fighting Saints	6 – 1	Green Bay Gamblers	Mystique Ice Center
7:22 - Keegan Ford (1); 8:51 - pp - Nate Sucese (1)		First period	No scoring
No scoring		Second period	Jason Dhooghe (1) - 17:00
8:35 - Evan Smith (1); 12:21 - Evan Smith (2); 15:57 - en - Nate Sucese (2); 19:37 - Shane Kavanagh (1)		Third period	No scoring
Hunter Miska (28 saves / 29 shots)		Goalie stats	Adam Húska (24 saves / 29 shots)

April 23	Dubuque Fighting Saints	2 – 1	OT	Green Bay Gamblers	Mystique Ice Center
No scoring		First period		No scoring
4:01 - pp - Willie Knierim (2)		Second period		Andrew Peeke (1) - 10:25
No scoring		Third period		No scoring
16:55 - Brett Boeing (1)		First overtime period		No scoring
Hunter Miska (37 saves / 38 shots)		Goalie stats		Adam Húska (25 saves / 27 shots)

Dubuque wins series 3 – 1

=== Western Conference ===
==== (1) Tri-City Storm vs. (4) Sioux Falls Stampede ====
April 14	Tri-City Storm	4 – 0	Sioux Falls Stampede	Viaero Center
11:32 - Wade Allison (1); 13:18 - Carson Meyer (1); 17:59 - Jake Wahlin (1)		First period	No scoring
No scoring		Second period	No scoring
4:37 - Carson Meyer (2)		Third period	No scoring
Jake Kielly (27 saves / 27 shots)		Goalie stats	Stefanos Lekkas (36 saves / 40 shots)

April 15	Tri-City Storm	4 – 2	Sioux Falls Stampede	Viaero Center
12:29 - Wade Allison (2)		First period	Jack Becker (1) - 5:31; Lawton Courtnall (1) - 10:40
2:06 - pp - Tory Dello (1); 5:41 - Alex Limoges (1)		Second period	No scoring
3:44 - Nico Sturm (1)		Third period	No scoring
Jake Kielly (23 saves / 25 shots)		Goalie stats	Stefanos Lekkas (41 saves / 45 shots)

April 22	Sioux Falls Stampede	1 – 4	Tri-City Storm	Denny Sanford Premier Center
12:37 - Carson Gicewicz (1)		First period	No scoring
No scoring		Second period	Max Humitz (1) - 2:57; Alex Limoges (2) - 4:00; Nico Sturm (2) - pp - 19:26
No scoring		Third period	Dan Labosky (1) - pp - en - 18:41
Stefanos Lekkas (40 saves / 43 shots)		Goalie stats	Jake Kielly (32 saves / 33 shots)

Tri-City wins series 3 – 0

==== (2) Lincoln Stars vs. (3) Waterloo Black Hawks ====
April 15	Lincoln Stars	1 – 2	Waterloo Black Hawks	Ice Box
No scoring		First period	Mikey Anderson (1) - pp - 14:32
No scoring		Second period	Sam McCormick (1) - pp - 11:05
14:32 - pp - Collin Peters (1)		Third period	No scoring
Peyton Jones (26 saves / 28 shots)		Goalie stats	Cale Morris (23 saves / 24 shots)

April 16	Lincoln Stars	5 – 0	Waterloo Black Hawks	Ice Box
9:46 - Joachim Weberg (1)		First period	No scoring
3:32 - sh - Collin Peters (2); 13:29 - pp - Trevor Hamilton (1)		Second period	No scoring
14:07 - Trevor Hamilton (2); 16:45 - en - Grant Jozefek (1)		Third period	No scoring
Peyton Jones (23 saves / 23 shots)		Goalie stats	Cale Morris (19 saves / 23 shots)

April 23	Waterloo Black Hawks	4 – 3	Lincoln Stars	Young Arena
4:26 - Nick Swaney (1); 10:00 - pp - Ronnie Hein (1)		First period	Trevor Hamilton (3) - pp - 16:26
6:13 - Zach Yon (1); 15:35 - Ryan Lohin (1)		Second period	Tanner Laczynski (1) - 13:42
No scoring		Third period	8:42 - Anthony Wyse (1)
Cale Morris (38 saves / 41 shots)		Goalie stats	Peyton Jones (28 saves / 32 shots)

April 24	Waterloo Black Hawks	4 – 3	2OT	Lincoln Stars	Young Arena
11:10 - pp - Yuri Terao (1)		First period		Ludvig Hoff (1) - 15:31
12:48 - sh - Mikey Anderson (2); 18:36 - Sam McCormick (2)		Second period		Biagio Lerario (1) - pp - 13:26; Collin Peters (3) - 14:12
No scoring		Third period		No scoring
9:32 - Ronnie Hein (2)		Second overtime period		No scoring
Cale Morris (49 saves / 52 shots)		Goalie stats		Peyton Jones (66 saves / 70 shots)

Waterloo wins series 3 – 1

== Conference Finals ==
=== Eastern Conference ===
==== (3) Dubuque Fighting Saints vs. (4) Bloomington Thunder ====
April 29	Dubuque Fighting Saints	7 – 1	Bloomington Thunder	Mystique Ice Center
No scoring		First period	Steve Merl (1) - 2:42
5:50 - Dallas Gerads (2); 7:34 - Keegan Ford (2); 10:42 - Michael O'Leary (1); 12:19 - Petter Mäkitalo (3)		Second period	No scoring
3:15 - pp - Keegan Ford (3); 17:46 - pp - Willie Knierim (3); 19:07 - Michael O'Leary (2)		Third period	No scoring
Hunter Miska (18 saves / 19 shots)		Goalie stats	Hayden Lavigne (17 saves / 21 shots); Logan Halladay (14 saves / 17 shots)

April 30	Dubuque Fighting Saints	3 – 4	Bloomington Thunder	Mystique Ice Center
No scoring		First period	Patrick Curry (2) - pp - 9:33; Jake Slaker (4) - ps - 18:18
No scoring		Second period	Mitchell Mattson (1) - 5:44
3:02 - sh - Michael O'Leary (3); 6:16 - pp - Mitchell Smith (2); 19:41 - Petter Mäkitalo (4)		Third period	Blake Gober (1) - 18:18
Hunter Miska (15 saves / 19 shots)		Goalie stats	Hayden Lavigne (26 saves / 29 shots)

May 6	Bloomington Thunder	4 – 6	Dubuque Fighting Saints	U.S. Cellular Coliseum
9:14 - Alec Mehr (3); 13:18 - pp - Blake Gober (2)		First period	Shane Kavanagh (2) - sh - 12:52
11:48 - Cam Spicer (1)		Second period	Mitchell Smith (3) - 2:45; Michael O'Leary (4) - 3:15; Keegan Ford (4) - 14:41
18:11 - Patrick Curry (3)		Third period	Joey Keane (1) - pp - 2:37; Nate Sucese (3) - sh - en - 19:53
Hayden Lavigne (25 saves / 30 shots)		Goalie stats	Hunter Miska (38 saves / 42 shots)

May 7	Bloomington Thunder	3 – 2	OT	Dubuque Fighting Saints	U.S. Cellular Coliseum
8:03 - pp - Jake Slaker (5)		First period		Mitchell Smith (4) - 11:53
No scoring		Second period		No scoring
14:28 - Tarek Baker (2)		Third period		Keegan Ford (5) - pp - 8:21
8:45 - Brogan Rafferty (3)		First overtime period		No scoring
Hayden Lavigne (39 saves / 41 shots)		Goalie stats		Hunter Miska (24 saves / 27 shots)

May 10	Dubuque Fighting Saints	3 – 0	Bloomington Thunder	Mystique Ice Center
No scoring		First period	No scoring
6:56 - sh - Casey Johnson (1); 10:55 - Zach Solow (1)		Second period	No scoring
18:28 - en - Andrew Kerr (1)		Third period	No scoring
Hunter Miska (25 saves / 25 shots)		Goalie stats	Hayden Lavigne (36 saves / 38 shots)

Dubuque wins series 3 – 2

=== Western Conference ===
==== (1) Tri-City Storm vs. (3) Waterloo Black Hawks ====
April 29	Tri-City Storm	4 – 0	Waterloo Black Hawks	Viaero Center
9:26 - pp - Carson Meyer (3); 15:26 - Nico Sturm (3)		First period	No scoring
No scoring		Second period	No scoring
19:26 - en - Dan Labosky (2); 19:57 - en - Walker Duehr (1)		Third period	No scoring
Jake Kielly (32 saves / 32 shots)		Goalie stats	Cale Morris (39 saves / 41 shots)

April 30	Tri-City Storm	1 – 3	Waterloo Black Hawks	Viaero Center
No scoring		First period	Ben Newhouse (1) - 3:11
9:03 - Carson Meyer (4)		Second period	Yuri Terao (2) - 17:47
No scoring		Third period	Nick Swaney (2) - en - 19:54
Jake Kielly (28 saves / 30 shots)		Goalie stats	Cale Morris (32 saves / 33 shots)

May 6	Waterloo Black Hawks	0 – 3	Tri-City Storm	Young Arena
No scoring		First period	Wade Allison (3) - 5:45
No scoring		Second period	Max Humitz (2) - 4:01
No scoring		Third period	Jake Wahlin (2) - en - 19:54
Cale Morris (24 saves / 26 shots)		Goalie stats	Jake Kielly (41 saves / 41 shots)

May 7	Waterloo Black Hawks	7 – 4	Tri-City Storm	Young Arena
9:12 - Yuri Terao (3); 11:41 - sh - Ronnie Hein (3)		First period	No scoring
8:31 - pp - Nick Swaney (3)		Second period	Brandon Duhaime (1) - 4:35; Monte Graham (1) - 5:50
12:13 - Sam McCormick (3); 15:26 - Nick Swaney (4); 17:12 - pp - Mikey Anderson (3); 18:59 - en - Nick Swaney (5)		Third period	Carson Meyer (5) - 11:26; Alex Limoges (3) - pp - 18:27
Cale Morris (25 saves / 29 shots)		Goalie stats	Jake Kielly (33 saves / 39 shots)

May 10	Tri-City Storm	5 – 3	Waterloo Black Hawks	Viaero Center
1:37 - Max Humitz (3)		First period	Liam Pecararo (1) - pp - 9:01; Collin Saccoman (1) - 12:06
0:48 - Wade Allison (4); 3:59 - sh - Brandon Duhaime (2)		Second period	No scoring
0:17 - Jake Wahlin (3); 18:58 - en - Jake Wahlin (4)		Third period	Michael Davies (1) - 17:47
Jake Kielly (35 saves / 38 shots)		Goalie stats	Cale Morris (31 saves / 35 shots)

Tri-City wins series 3 – 2

== Clark Cup Finals ==
=== (W1) Tri-City Storm vs. (E3) Dubuque Fighting Saints ===
May 13	Tri-City Storm	5 – 1	Dubuque Fighting Saints	Mystique Ice Center
No scoring		First period	No scoring
No scoring		Second period	Evan Smith (3) - pp - 19:47
1:04 - Wade Allison (5); 5:12 - pp - Tory Dello (2); 15:47 - pp - Dan Labosky (3); 17:33 - sh - en - Wade Allison (6); 19:45 - en - Brandon Duhaime (3)		Third period	No scoring
Jake Kielly (34 saves / 35 shots)		Goalie stats	Hunter Miska (27 saves / 30 shots)

May 14	Tri-City Storm	4 – 2	Dubuque Fighting Saints	Mystique Ice Center
15:52 - Wade Allison (7)		First period	Carson Vance (1) - 6:21
3:17 - sh - Dan Labosky (4); 7:06 - Wade Allison (8)		Second period	Casey Johnson (2) - 19:50
18:28 - en - Dan Labosky (5)		Third period	No scoring
Jake Kielly (25 saves / 27 shots)		Goalie stats	Hunter Miska (16 saves / 19 shots)

May 20	Dubuque Fighting Saints	1 – 4	Tri-City Storm	Viaero Center
No scoring		First period	Alex Limoges (4) - pp - 16:29
12:15 - Nate Sucese (4)		Second period	Alex Limoges (5) - 4:39
No scoring		Third period	Wade Allison (9) - 0:57; Brandon Duhaime (4) - en - 18:15
Hunter Miska (40 saves / 43 shots)		Goalie stats	Jake Kielly (30 saves / 31 shots)

Tri-City wins series 3 – 0

== Playoff scoring leaders ==
Note: GP = Games played; G = Goals; A = Assists; Pts = Points; PIM = Penalty minutes

Player	Team	GP	G	A	Pts	PIM
Dan Labosky	Tri-City Storm	11	5	14	19	16
Wade Allison	Tri-City Storm	11	9	7	16	4
Alex Limoges	Tri-City Storm	11	5	9	14	6
Jake Slaker	Bloomington Thunder	10	5	7	12	25
Keegan Ford	Dubuque Fighting Saints	12	5	7	12	0
Carson Meyer	Tri-City Storm	11	5	6	11	4
Logan Lambdin	Bloomington Thunder	9	4	6	10	2
Nate Sucese	Dubuque Fighting Saints	12	4	6	10	2
Evan Smith	Dubuque Fighting Saints	12	3	7	10	12
Nick Swaney	Waterloo Black Hawks	9	5	4	9	2
Jake Wahlin	Tri-City Storm	11	4	5	9	6
Mitchell Smith	Dubuque Fighting Saints	11	4	5	9	6
Brogan Rafferty	Bloomington Thunder	10	3	6	9	4

== Playoff leading goaltenders ==
Note: GP = Games played; Mins = Minutes played; W = Wins; L = Losses; GA = Goals Allowed; SO = Shutouts; SV% = Save percentage; GAA = Goals against average

Player	Team	GP	Mins	W	L	GA	SO	SV%	GAA
Jake Kielly	Tri-City Storm	11	657	9	2	18	3	.950	1.64
Peyton Jones	Lincoln Stars	4	278	1	3	10	1	.935	2.16
Hunter Miska	Dubuque Fighting Saints	12	750	6	6	28	1	.921	2.24
Cale Morris	Waterloo Black Hawks	9	577	5	4	24	0	.921	2.50
Adam Húska	Green Bay Gamblers	4	271	1	3	12	0	.902	2.65
