= Brandon Duhaime =

American ice hockey player (born 1997)

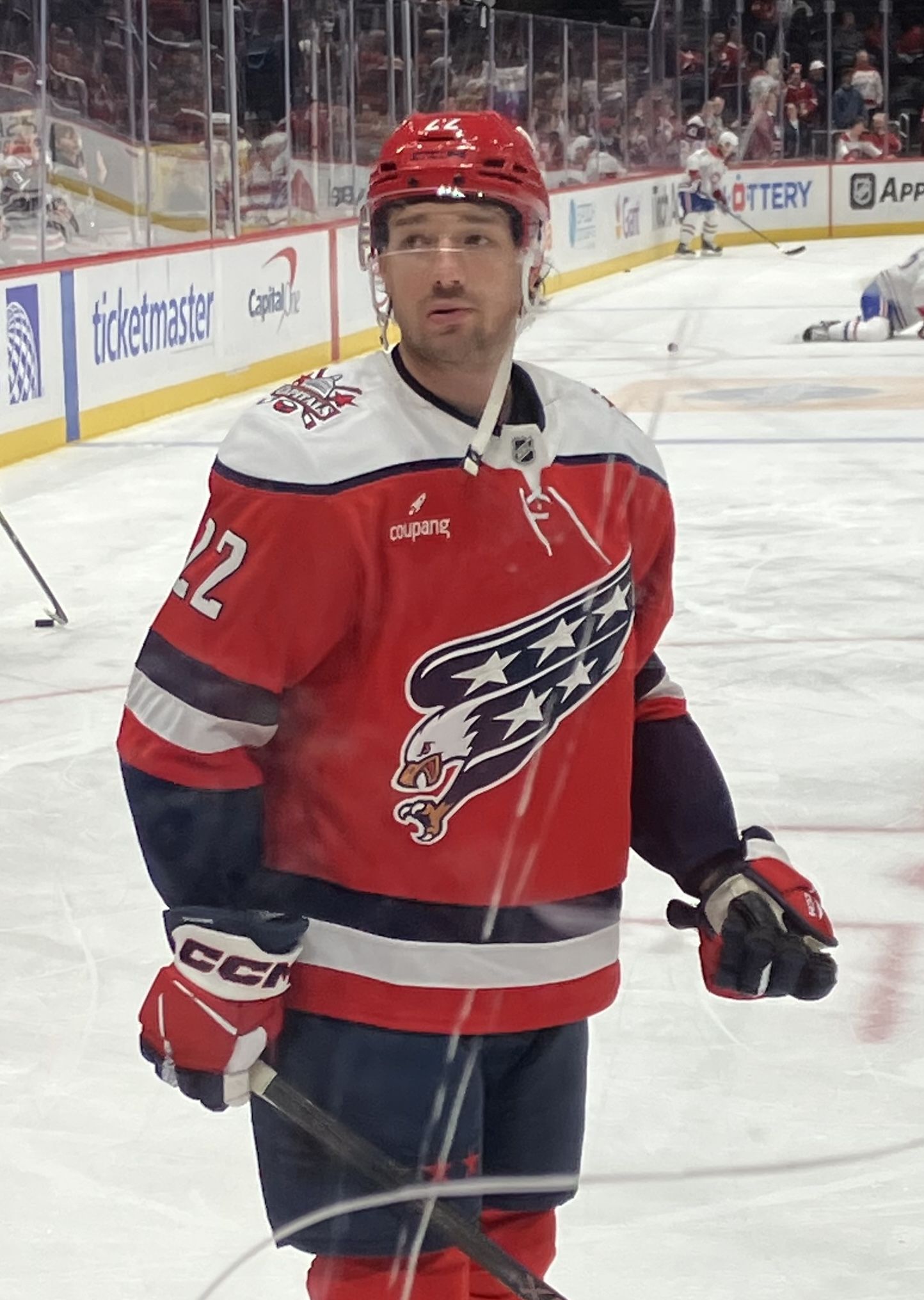
- Duhaime with the Washington Capitals in 2026
- Born: May 22, 1997 (age 29) Coral Springs, Florida, U.S.
- Height: 6 ft 2 in (188 cm)
- Weight: 200 lb (91 kg; 14 st 4 lb)
- Position: Winger
- Shoots: Left
- NHL team Former teams: Toronto Maple Leafs; Minnesota Wild; Colorado Avalanche; Washington Capitals
- NHL draft: 106th overall, 2016; Minnesota Wild
- Playing career: 2019–present

Brandon Duhaime (/duˈheɪm/ doo-HAYM; born May 22, 1997) is an American professional ice hockey player who is a winger for the Toronto Maple Leafs of the National Hockey League (NHL). He was selected by the Minnesota Wild in the fourth round, 106th overall, of the 2016 NHL entry draft.

Duhaime was born and raised in Florida by Canadian parents before leaving at the age of 14 to play junior ice hockey with the Pursuit of Excellence (POE) Hockey Academy in Kelowna, British Columbia. Following this, he played one season with the Merritt Centennials in the British Columbia Hockey League (BCHL) and Chicago Steel of the United States Hockey League before joining the Providence Friars men's ice hockey team at Providence College.

During his three-year collegiate career, Duhaime was named to the Hockey East Third All-Star Team and All-Tournament Team while leading the team to the 2018 Frozen Four. Upon concluding his junior year, Duhaime joined the Wild's American Hockey League (AGL) affiliate, the Iowa Wild.

== Early life ==
Duhaime was born on May 22, 1997, in Coral Springs, Florida, to parents Trevor and Martine Duhaime. His father was a former professional ice hockey player who played at both the American Hockey League and ECHL level. Due to his father’s career and his mother’s Quebec heritage, Duhaime began skating at the age of two and attended Florida Panthers games. While living in Florida as a kid, his parents drove him 90 minutes to play ice hockey with a team. He began playing hockey with future NHL teammate and Florida native Jakob Chychrun, whom he remained friends with throughout their professional careers.

== Playing career ==
=== Amateur ===
While playing minor ice hockey, Duhaime won the Bell Capital Cup in Ottawa and qualified for nationals in Buffalo with the Everblades. Duhaime then left Florida with his father at the age of 14 to play junior hockey with the Pursuit of Excellence (POE) Hockey Academy in Kelowna, British Columbia. During his tenure with POE, he recorded 32 points through 37 U18 Prep Canadian Sport School Hockey League games. Following this, Duhaime played one full season in the British Columbia Hockey League (BCHL) with the Merritt Centennials. In his rookie season with the team, Duhaime was invited to take part in the Canadian Junior Hockey League’s Prospects Game. He subsequently finished the 2014–15 season with six goals and 19 assists through 53 games.

Following his lone season in the BCHL, Duhaime joined the Chicago Steel of the United States Hockey League for the 2015–16 season. In December 2015, Duhaime de-committed from playing collegiate ice hockey with Brown University and began being recruited by other schools. While with the Steel, he tallied 10 goals and 20 assists through 35 games before committing to play collegiate ice hockey with the Providence College of the Hockey East for the 2016–17 season. Duhaime was shortly thereafter traded to the Tri-City Storm whom he helped win the Clark Cup championship. Prior to his freshman season at Providence College, Duhaime was drafted 106th overall by the Minnesota Wild in the 2016 NHL entry draft.

=== Collegiate ===
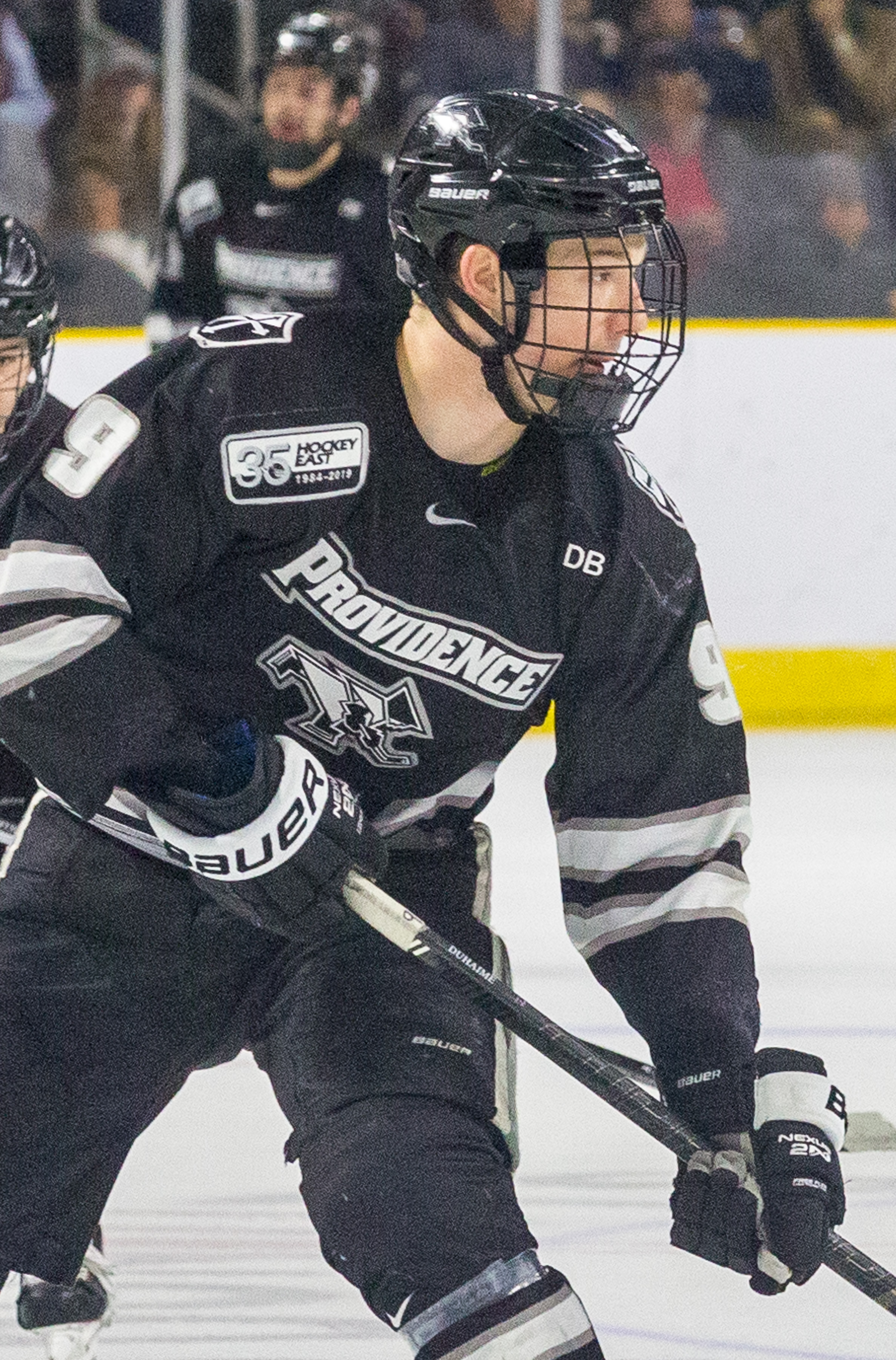
Duhaime with the Providence Friars in 2019

Duhaime played for the Providence Friars men's ice hockey team at Providence College from 2016 to 2019 while majoring in sociology. During his rookie season, Duhaime played in 35 games and recorded four goals and eight assists. He tallied his first career collegiate goal on October 21, 2016, in a 3–3 tie with the Clarkson Golden Knights. Following his rookie season, Duhaime attended the Minnesota Wild's 2017 Development Camp where he was recognized as their most improved prospect. Duhaime returned to the Friars for his sophomore season where he improved to seven goals and 19 assists through 40 games.

He helped the Friars qualify for the 2018 Frozen Four by tallying an assist and a goal in their 4–0 win over Cornell University in the NCAA East Regional Finals. Prior to this achievement, Duhaime was named a Hockey East Third Team All-Star in recognition of his offensive improvement and career-high season. He had tallied 10 goals and 19 assists for 29 points at the time of the honor and became the first Friar to record multiple playoff overtime goals. The Friars met with the Minnesota Duluth Bulldogs in the Frozen Four Semifinal whom subsequently eliminated with a final score of 4–1. After completing his junior season with the Friars, Duhaime ended his collegiate career in signing a two-year, entry-level contract with the Minnesota Wild on April 18, 2019.

=== Minnesota Wild ===
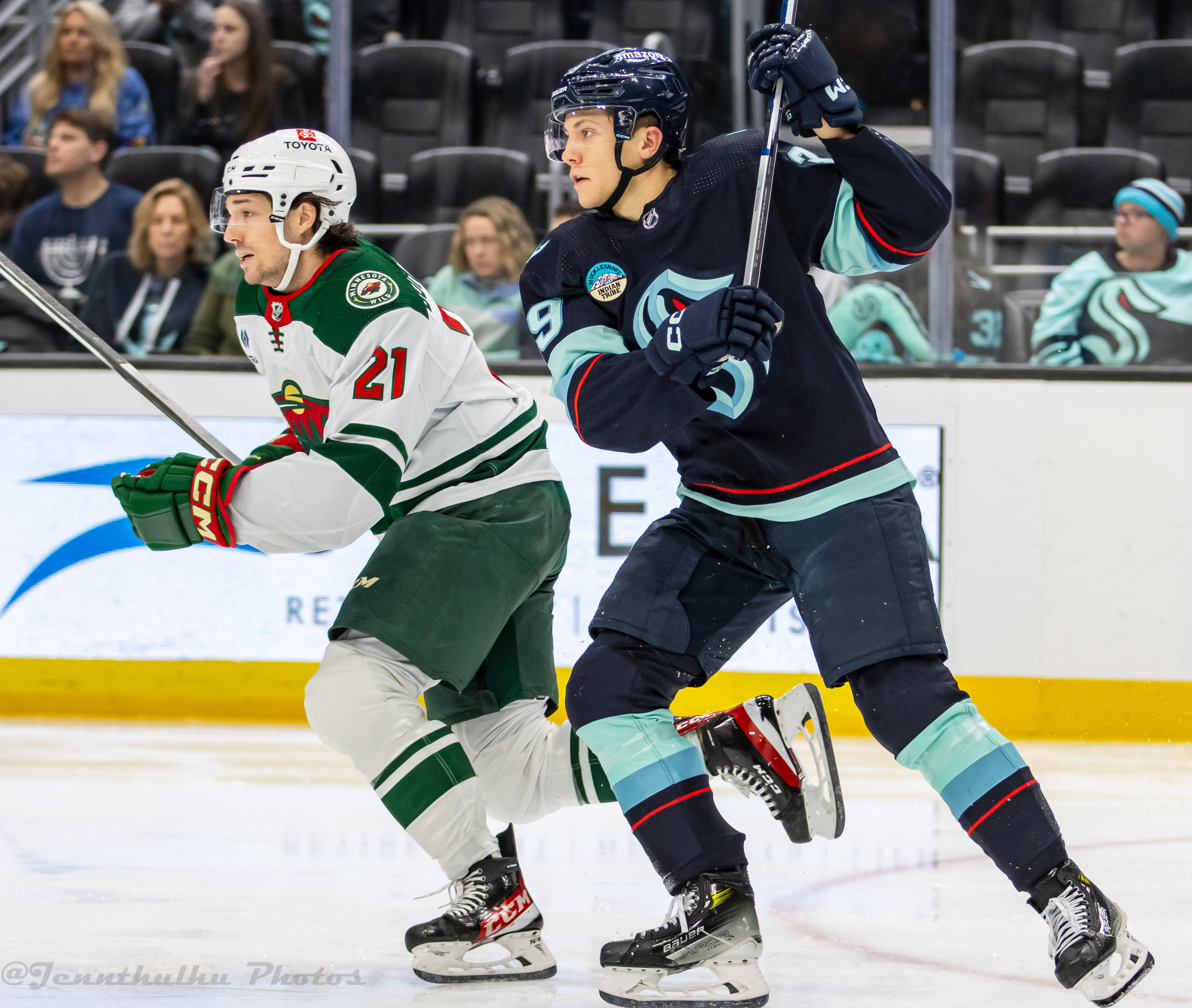
Duhaime (left) in action for the Wild in 2023.

Following the signing of his entry-level contract, Duhaime joined their American Hockey League (AHL) affiliate, the Iowa Wild, on an amateur tryout agreement for the remainder of the season. He made Minnesota's opening night roster to begin the 2021–22 season and made his NHL debut in a 2–1 win over the Anaheim Ducks on October 16, 2021. He later scored his first career NHL goal against the same team on October 23, by accidentally deflecting the puck off of his skate. Duhaime consistently played with the Wild before missing his first game on January 6, 2022, due to him testing positive for COVID-19.

=== Colorado Avalanche ===
On March 7, 2024, the Wild traded Duhaime to the Colorado Avalanche in exchange for a 2026 third-round draft pick. Duhaime faced the Wild the next day in his debut with the Avalanche. In a pre-game interview, he described it as "a weird experience," but noted he preferred to face his former team quickly to "get it out of the way". The Avalanche won the game 2–1 in overtime.

=== Washington Capitals ===
On July 1, 2024, Washington Capitals signed Duhaime to a two-year, $3.7 million contract.

=== Toronto Maple Leafs ===
On July 1, 2026, having concluded his contract with the Capitals, Duhaime as a free agent joined his fourth NHL outfit in agreeing to a three-year, $7.8 million contract with the Toronto Maple Leafs.

== Career statistics ==
| | | | Regular season | | | | | Playoffs |
| Season | Team | League | GP | G | A | Pts | PIM | GP | G | A | Pts | PIM |
|---|---|---|---|---|---|---|---|---|---|---|---|---|
| 2013–14 | West Kelowna Warriors | BCHL | 3 | 0 | 0 | 0 | 0 | — | — | — | — | — |
| 2014–15 | Merritt Centennials | BCHL | 53 | 6 | 19 | 25 | 43 | 4 | 0 | 0 | 0 | 2 |
| 2015–16 | Chicago Steel | USHL | 39 | 10 | 22 | 32 | 97 | — | — | — | — | — |
| 2015–16 | Tri-City Storm | USHL | 18 | 5 | 5 | 10 | 46 | 11 | 4 | 4 | 8 | 24 |
| 2016–17 | Providence College | HE | 35 | 4 | 8 | 12 | 45 | — | — | — | — | — |
| 2017–18 | Providence College | HE | 40 | 7 | 19 | 26 | 64 | — | — | — | — | — |
| 2018–19 | Providence College | HE | 42 | 11 | 23 | 34 | 53 | — | — | — | — | — |
| 2019–20 | Iowa Wild | AHL | 63 | 6 | 14 | 20 | 71 | — | — | — | — | — |
| 2020–21 | Iowa Wild | AHL | 24 | 6 | 3 | 9 | 32 | — | — | — | — | — |
| 2021–22 | Minnesota Wild | NHL | 80 | 6 | 11 | 17 | 122 | 6 | 0 | 0 | 0 | 2 |
| 2022–23 | Minnesota Wild | NHL | 51 | 9 | 1 | 10 | 42 | 6 | 0 | 0 | 0 | 10 |
| 2023–24 | Minnesota Wild | NHL | 62 | 4 | 4 | 8 | 66 | — | — | — | — | — |
| 2023–24 | Colorado Avalanche | NHL | 18 | 1 | 4 | 5 | 4 | 11 | 1 | 0 | 1 | 8 |
| 2024–25 | Washington Capitals | NHL | 82 | 9 | 12 | 21 | 98 | 10 | 3 | 1 | 4 | 10 |
| 2025–26 | Washington Capitals | NHL | 82 | 4 | 5 | 9 | 78 | — | — | — | — | — |
| NHL totals | | | 375 | 33 | 37 | 70 | 410 | 33 | 4 | 1 | 5 | 30 |

== Awards and honours ==
| Award | Year | Ref |
USHL
| Clark Cup champion | 2016 | |
College
| Hockey East All-Tournament Team | 2018 | |
| Hockey East Third All-Star Team | 2019 | |
