= Nick Swaney =

American ice hockey player (born 1997)

- Swaney in 2026
- Born: September 9, 1997 (age 29) Lakeville, Minnesota, U.S.
- Height: 5 ft 10 in (178 cm)
- Weight: 179 lb (81 kg; 12 st 11 lb)
- Position: Right wing
- Shoots: Right
- ICEHL team Former teams: Graz99ers; Minnesota Wild
- NHL draft: 209th overall, 2017; Minnesota Wild
- Playing career: 2021–present

Nick Swaney (born September 9, 1997) is an American professional ice hockey forward for Graz99ers of the ICE Hockey League (ICEHL). He was selected 209th overall by the Minnesota Wild in the 2017 NHL entry draft.

== Playing career ==
Swaney, a Lakeville, Minnesota native, attended Lakeville South High School before playing in the United States Hockey League (USHL) with the Waterloo Black Hawks. During his tenure with Lakeville South High, he committed to a collegiate career with the University of the Minnesota-Duluth of the National Collegiate Hockey Conference (NCHC).

After recording 115 points through 120 career games in the USHL, Swaney was drafted by homestate club, the Minnesota Wild, in the seventh-round, 209th overall, of the 2017 NHL entry draft before joining the Bulldogs as a freshman.

In his senior season with the Bulldogs in 2020–21, Swaney as an alternate captain, recorded 28 points in as many games to lead Minnesota-Dulth in scoring. At the conclusion of his collegiate career, Swaney was signed by the Wild to a one-year, entry-level contract on April 11, 2021, and was immediately signed to an Amateur Tryout contract to join AHL affiliate, the Iowa Wild, for the remainder of the season.

In his first full professional season, Swaney after attending Minnesota's 2021 training camp, was assigned to continue his tenure with the Iowa Wild in the AHL. Remaining with Iowa for the entirety of the 2021–22 season, Swaney as a rookie tallied 16 goals and 38 points through 62 games, placing fifth in team scoring.

As a restricted free agent, Swaney was re-signed by the Minnesota Wild to a one-year, two-way contract on July 17, 2022. In the 2022–23 season, Swaney remained with the Iowa Wild, solidifying his role as a scoring forward in notching 18 goals and 30 points through 48 games despite missing games through injury. On April 13, 2022, Swaney was recalled by Minnesota and made his NHL debut in the Wild's final regular season game, in a 4–3 overtime defeat to the Nashville Predators.

For the second consecutive off-season, Swaney was re-signed by the Wild as a restricted free agent to a one-year, two-way contract on June 30, 2023.

Leaving the Wild organization after four seasons, Swaney as a free agent was signed to a one-year AHL contract with the Chicago Wolves on August 2, 2024.

Following his fifth professional season in North America, Swaney as a free agent opted to pursue a career abroad, agreeing to a one-year contract with Austrian based club, Graz99ers of the ICEHL, on May 6, 2025.

== Career statistics ==
=== Regular season and playoffs ===
			Regular season					Playoffs
Season	Team	League	GP	G	A	Pts	PIM	GP	G	A	Pts	PIM
2012–13	Lakeville South High	USHS	25	12	13	25	7	3	1	2	3	0
2013–14	Lakeville South High	USHS	24	13	31	44	14	2	2	4	6	2
2013–14	Waterloo Black Hawks	USHL	4	1	0	1	2	—	—	—	—	—
2014–15	Lakeville South High	USHS	24	25	32	57	0	2	4	0	4	0
2014–15	Waterloo Black Hawks	USHL	15	9	4	13	0	—	—	—	—	—
2015–16	Waterloo Black Hawks	USHL	54	30	20	50	26	9	5	4	9	2
2016–17	Waterloo Black Hawks	USHL	47	26	25	51	12	8	1	1	2	6
2017–18	U. of Minnesota-Duluth	NCHC	35	6	16	22	6	—	—	—	—	—
2018–19	U. of Minnesota-Duluth	NCHC	40	15	10	25	0	—	—	—	—	—
2019–20	U. of Minnesota-Duluth	NCHC	31	12	14	26	4	—	—	—	—	—
2020–21	U. of Minnesota-Duluth	NCHC	28	13	15	28	10	—	—	—	—	—
2020–21	Iowa Wild	AHL	6	1	1	2	0	—	—	—	—	—
2021–22	Iowa Wild	AHL	62	16	22	38	18	—	—	—	—	—
2022–23	Iowa Wild	AHL	48	18	12	30	14	2	0	0	0	2
2022–23	Minnesota Wild	NHL	1	0	0	0	0	—	—	—	—	—
2023–24	Iowa Wild	AHL	7	1	1	2	0	—	—	—	—	—
2024–25	Chicago Wolves	AHL	48	9	12	21	12	2	0	0	0	2
NHL totals			1	0	0	0	0	—	—	—	—	—

=== International ===
Year	Team	Event	Result	GP	G	A	Pts	PIM
2014	United States	IH18	3rd place, bronze medalist(s)	5	0	2	2	4
Junior totals				5	0	2	2	4

== Awards and honors ==
Award	Year
USHL
Second All-Star Team	2017
College
NCAA Champions	2018, 2019
NCHC Honorable Mention All-Star Team	2019
NCHC First All-Star Team	2021
