= Callahan Burke =

American ice hockey player (born 1997)

- Born: March 24, 1997 (age 29) Boxborough, Massachusetts, U.S.
- Height: 5 ft 10 in (178 cm)
- Weight: 183 lb (83 kg; 13 st 1 lb)
- Position: Right wing
- Shoots: Right
- team Former teams: Free agent Colorado Avalanche; Carolina Hurricanes; Vegas Golden Knights
- NHL draft: Undrafted
- Playing career: 2021–present

Callahan "Cal" Michael Burke (born March 24, 1997) is an American professional ice hockey forward who is currently an unrestricted free agent. He most recently played for the San Diego Gulls of the American Hockey League (AHL). He has previously played in the National Hockey League (NHL) for the Colorado Avalanche, Carolina Hurricanes, and Vegas Golden Knights.

== Playing career ==
=== Amateur ===
Burke as a youth attended Noble and Greenough School, in Dedham, Massachusetts, and played three seasons from 2011–14, serving as team captain in the 2013–14 season to total 89 points through 83 games. Having been drafted by the Cedar Rapids RoughRiders, 50th overall, in the United States Hockey League (USHL) 2013 Futures Draft, he joined the RoughRiders following the completion of his tenure with Noble and Greenough. He appeared in 5 games to end the 2013–14 season.

In his first full season in the USHL in the 2014–15 season, Burke collected 20 goals and 40 points through 60 games. He returned for a second season in the 2015–16 season, serving as team captain in contributing with 14 goals and 25 assists for 39 points in 56 games, placing fourth on the team in scoring.

Committing to a collegiate career with the Notre Dame Fighting Irish, Burke as a freshman played the 2016–17 season in a depth forward role and added 3 goals and 11 points in 35 games before he was injured in game one of the Hockey East quarterfinals series against Providence College.

With the Fighting Irish moving to the Big Ten Conference for the 2017–18 season, Burke as a sophomore was given an increased offensive role and responded by totalling a career best 14 goals for 26 points through 38 games. On December 9, 2017, he posted his first career hat-trick and led the Irish to a 6-2 win over the University of Wisconsin, marking the first hat-trick for Notre Dame since Steven Fogarty in 2015. Helping Notre Dame advance to the Frozen Four, Burke scored a goal against the University of Michigan, which resulted in a berth in the National Championship game.

In the 2018–19 season, Burke recorded a career best 30 points and as a junior tied for the team lead in goals with 12. In claiming a second consecutive Big Ten Championships and reaching the Frozen Four, he was a recipient of the B1G Sportsmanship award.

Approaching his final and senior season in 2019–20 season, Callahan's leadership within the Fighting Irish was recognized as he was selected to serve as Notre Dame's team captain. He made 37 appearances and tallied 7 goals and 14 assists for 21 points. He concluded his collegiate career by earning a second consecutive B1G Sportsmanship Award and was named to the Lowes Senior Class All-American First Team.

=== Professional ===
As an undrafted free agent, Burke embarked on his professional career by signing a one-year contract with the Colorado Eagles of the American Hockey League (AHL), the primary affiliate of the Colorado Avalanche on March 18, 2020. With the 2020–21 season, delayed due to the COVID-19 pandemic, Burke made a professional debut, registering an assist, in a 3–2 defeat to the San Diego Gulls on February 13, 2021. He later notched his first professional goal with the Eagles against the Bakersfield Condors on April 13, 2021. In showing capability as a two-way check forward, Burke completed his rookie year with the Eagles, registering 2 goals and 9 points in 33 regular season games. He tallied an assist in 2 post-season games in the Pacific Divisional playoffs.

On June 17, 2021, Burke was signed to a one-year contract extension to continue his tenure with the Eagles. In the following 2021–22 season, Burke increased his offensive output, registering 14 points through his first 19 games with the Eagles to earn a one-year NHL contract with parent club, the Colorado Avalanche, on December 16, 2021. Remaining on assignment with the Eagles, Burke finished his second professional season in posting 26 points through 57 regular season games.

As a restricted free agent, Burke was signed to a one-year, two-way contract extension with the reigning Stanley Cup champion Avalanche on July 20, 2022. After attending Colorado's 2022 training camp, Burke was re-assigned to begin the 2022–23 season with the Eagles. In his third season with the Eagles, Burke posted 11 points through 21 games before he received his first recall to the NHL by the injury-plagued Avalanche on December 6, 2022. He made his NHL debut the following day, featuring on the fourth-line for the depleted Avalanche, in a 4–0 shutout defeat to his boyhood club, the Boston Bruins.

On October 10, 2023, Burke was traded by the Avalanche to the Carolina Hurricanes in exchange for Caleb Jones; however, he remained assigned to the Eagles due to Carolina's lack of an AHL affiliate. On October 20, 2023, Burke was recalled by the Hurricanes on an emergency basis after the team was shorthanded due to injury prior to an away game coincidently against the Colorado Avalanche. He made his debut with Carolina against his former club, featuring on the fourth-line in limited minutes of a 6–4 defeat. He was subsequently returned to the Colorado Eagles the following day on October 22, 2023.

Following the 2023–24 season, Burke signed a one-year contract with the Vegas Golden Knights on July 2, 2024. Burke subsequently debuted for Vegas on November 20, 2024, playing just under 10 minutes in a 3–0 loss to the Toronto Maple Leafs. Three days later, on November 23, Burke recorded his first career NHL goal, scoring against Sam Montembeault in a 6–2 Vegas victory over the Montreal Canadiens.

Burke was not re-signed by the Golden Knights following the 2024–25 NHL season, becoming a free agent for the second consecutive offseason. On September 17, 2025, Burke signed a professional tryout with the Pittsburgh Penguins, joining the team for training camp and the preseason. Burke was re-assigned to AHL training camp with the Wilkes-Barre/Scranton Penguins on September 29, and was later released from his PTO entirely on October 5. The following day, on October 6, Burke signed a one-year AHL contract with the San Diego Gulls, affiliate of the Anaheim Ducks.

== Personal ==
Burke is the son of Sharon and Garrett Burke, his father played collegiately with the University of Massachusetts-Lowell from 1988–1990. He has two younger brothers, Cam and C.J., with Cam also playing collegiate hockey with the Fighting Irish before transferring to Boston College for the 2022–23 season.

He originally graduated from Washington High School in Cedar Rapids, Iowa, and majored in Business Analytics during his tenure with Notre Dame.

== Career statistics ==
			Regular season					Playoffs
Season	Team	League	GP	G	A	Pts	PIM	GP	G	A	Pts	PIM
2011–12	Noble and Greenough School	USHS	29	5	4	9	—	—	—	—	—	—
2012–13	Noble and Greenough School	USHS	27	10	25	35	—	—	—	—	—	—
2013–14	Noble and Greenough School	USHS	27	19	26	45	—	—	—	—	—	—
2013–14	Boston Jr. Bruins	USPHL	2	0	1	1	0	—	—	—	—	—
2013–14	Cedar Rapids RoughRiders	USHL	5	0	0	0	0	—	—	—	—	—
2014–15	Cedar Rapids RoughRiders	USHL	60	20	20	40	28	3	0	0	0	0
2015–16	Cedar Rapids RoughRiders	USHL	56	14	25	39	8	5	3	1	4	0
2016–17	Notre Dame	HE	35	3	8	11	8	—	—	—	—	—
2017–18	Notre Dame	B1G	38	14	12	26	17	—	—	—	—	—
2018–19	Notre Dame	B1G	36	12	18	30	8	—	—	—	—	—
2019–20	Notre Dame	B1G	37	7	14	21	2	—	—	—	—	—
2020–21	Colorado Eagles	AHL	33	2	7	9	14	2	0	1	1	2
2021–22	Colorado Eagles	AHL	57	12	14	26	17	5	1	1	2	2
2022–23	Colorado Eagles	AHL	70	16	23	39	18	7	0	4	4	2
2022–23	Colorado Avalanche	NHL	2	0	0	0	0	—	—	—	—	—
2023–24	Colorado Eagles	AHL	57	16	23	39	25	3	2	1	3	0
2023–24	Carolina Hurricanes	NHL	1	0	0	0	0	—	—	—	—	—
2024–25	Henderson Silver Knights	AHL	60	10	9	19	8	—	—	—	—	—
2024–25	Vegas Golden Knights	NHL	7	1	0	1	2	—	—	—	—	—
2025–26	San Diego Gulls	AHL	58	5	12	17	4	2	0	0	0	0
NHL totals			10	1	0	1	2	—	—	—	—	—

== Awards and honors ==
Award	Year
College
B1G Sportsmanship Award	2019, 2020
Lowes Senior Class All-Americans First Team	2020
