= Tanner Laczynski =

American ice hockey player (born 1997)

- Born: June 1, 1997 (age 29) Minooka, Illinois, U.S.
- Height: 6 ft 1 in (185 cm)
- Weight: 205 lb (93 kg; 14 st 9 lb)
- Position: Center
- Shoots: Right
- NHL team (P) Cur. team Former teams: Vegas Golden Knights; Henderson Silver Knights (AHL); Philadelphia Flyers
- NHL draft: 169th overall, 2016; Philadelphia Flyers
- Playing career: 2021–present

Tanner Laczynski (born June 1, 1997) is an American professional ice hockey center for the Henderson Silver Knights of the American Hockey League (AHL), while under contract to the Vegas Golden Knights of the National Hockey League (NHL). Laczynski has previously played in the NHL for the Philadelphia Flyers, who drafted him in the sixth round of the 2016 NHL entry draft.

== Early life ==
Laczynski was born June 1, 1997, in Minooka, Illinois, to Ken and Dawn Laczynski. Raised in Shorewood, Illinois, Laczynski began playing ice hockey at the age of three, and he spent time with the Joliet Jaguars, Chicago Fury, and Chicago Mission minor ice hockey programs.

== Playing career ==
=== Amateur ===
During his first year of junior hockey in 2013–14, Laczynski was cut by the Chicago Steel of the United States Hockey League (USHL). He returned to the team the next season for an impressive year, recording 18 goals and 28 assists with the Steel.

=== College ===
In his career with Ohio State University, Laczynski recorded 143 points (48 goals and 95 assists) in 138 games.

=== Professional ===
Laczynski made his NHL debut against the New York Islanders on April 3, 2021. After skating with the team for five games, Laczynski suffered a torn acetabular labrum in his right hip. He received surgery for the injury on April 26, with an expected recovery time of 16 weeks. After only two days of attending the Flyers' 2021 training camp, head coach Alain Vigneault announced that Laczynski required another surgery on the opposite hip, and that he would likely miss the entirety of the 2021–22 NHL season. He ultimately appeared in 28 games for the Phantoms during the 2021–22 season, recording seven goals and 17 points in the process. He also appeared in one game with the Flyers. On July 26, 2022, the Flyers signed Laczynski to a two-year, $1.525 million contract extension.

As a free agent following the 2023–24 NHL season, Laczynski signed a two-year, two-way contract with the Vegas Golden Knights on July 1, 2024. Laczynski subsequently debuted for Vegas on December 19, playing seven and a half minutes in a 3–1 victory over the Vancouver Canucks. On February 25, 2026, Laczynski recorded the first three-point game of his career, registering three assists in a 6–4 Golden Knights victory over the Los Angeles Kings. Following the season, Laczynski subsequently signed a three-year extension with Vegas on July 1, keeping him with the Golden Knights through the 2028–29 season.

== Personal life ==
Laczynski and his wife Madison have one child together, born in 2022.

== Career statistics ==
=== Regular season and playoffs ===
			Regular season					Playoffs
Season	Team	League	GP	G	A	Pts	PIM	GP	G	A	Pts	PIM
2013–14	Chicago Steel	USHL	2	0	0	0	0	—	—	—	—	—
2014–15	Chicago Steel	USHL	57	18	28	46	10	—	—	—	—	—
2015–16	Chicago Steel	USHL	33	13	27	40	20	—	—	—	—	—
2015–16	Lincoln Stars	USHL	19	11	12	23	18	4	1	2	3	0
2016–17	Ohio State University	B1G	34	10	22	32	22	—	—	—	—	—
2017–18	Ohio State University	B1G	41	17	30	47	12	—	—	—	—	—
2018–19	Ohio State University	B1G	27	10	20	30	14	—	—	—	—	—
2019–20	Ohio State University	B1G	36	11	23	34	22	—	—	—	—	—
2020–21	Lehigh Valley Phantoms	AHL	14	6	4	10	0	—	—	—	—	—
2020–21	Philadelphia Flyers	NHL	5	0	0	0	0	—	—	—	—	—
2021–22	Lehigh Valley Phantoms	AHL	28	7	10	17	8	—	—	—	—	—
2021–22	Philadelphia Flyers	NHL	1	0	0	0	0	—	—	—	—	—
2022–23	Philadelphia Flyers	NHL	32	2	2	4	2	—	—	—	—	—
2022–23	Lehigh Valley Phantoms	AHL	2	1	2	3	0	—	—	—	—	—
2023–24	Lehigh Valley Phantoms	AHL	49	17	27	44	20	6	4	0	4	0
2024–25	Henderson Silver Knights	AHL	41	15	22	37	22	—	—	—	—	—
2024–25	Vegas Golden Knights	NHL	8	1	0	1	6	—	—	—	—	—
2025–26	Henderson Silver Knights	AHL	62	22	42	64	35	6	1	3	4	2
2025–26	Vegas Golden Knights	NHL	10	0	5	5	4	—	—	—	—	—
NHL totals			56	3	7	10	12	—	—	—	—	—

Medal record

Representing United States

Ice hockey

World Junior Championships
Gold medal – first place	2017 Canada	

=== International ===
Year	Team	Event	Result	GP	G	A	Pts	PIM
2015	United States	U18	5th	5	1	1	2	2
2016	United States	WJAC	1st place, gold medalist(s)	5	0	3	3	2
2017	United States	WJC	1st place, gold medalist(s)	7	1	1	2	2
Junior totals				17	2	5	7	6
