= Adam Húska =

Slovak ice hockey player

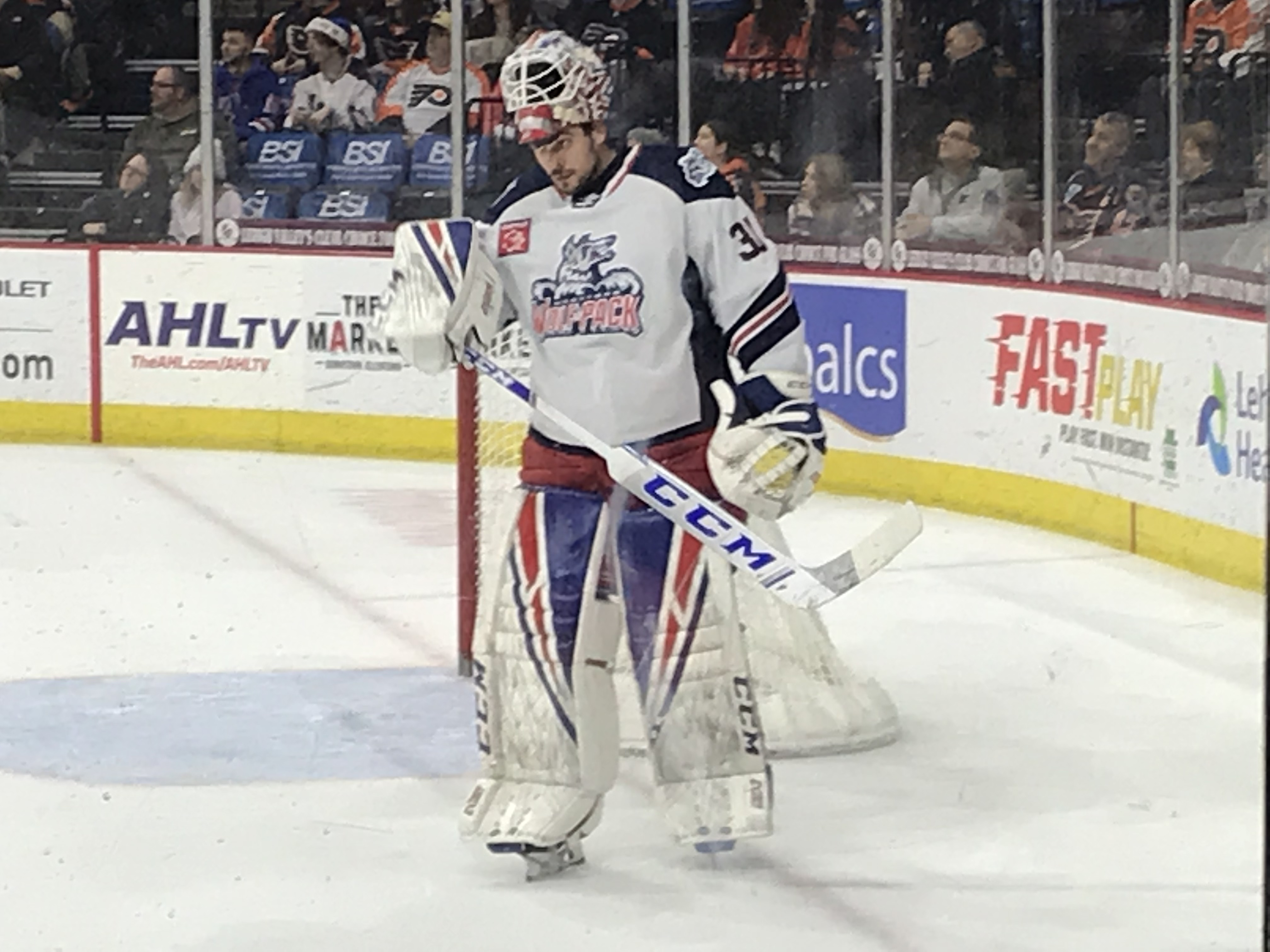
- Húska with the Hartford Wolf Pack in 2019
- Born: 12 May 1997 (age 29) Zvolen, Slovakia
- Height: 6 ft 3 in (191 cm)
- Weight: 198 lb (90 kg; 14 st 2 lb)
- Position: Goaltender
- Catches: Left
- team Former teams: Free agent HKM Zvolen; New York Rangers; Torpedo Nizhny Novgorod; HC Lugano; Admiral Vladivostok
- National team: Slovakia
- NHL draft: 184th overall, 2015; New York Rangers
- Playing career: 2013–present

Adam Húska (born 12 May 1997) is a Slovak ice hockey goaltender who is currently an unrestricted free agent. He most recently played for Admiral Vladivostok in the Kontinental Hockey League (KHL). Húska made a single appearance in the NHL for the New York Rangers in 2021.

== Playing career ==
Húska moved to North American hockey during the 2014–15 season when he began playing with the Green Bay Gamblers of the United States Hockey League and was drafted in the seventh round of the 2015 NHL entry draft by the New York Rangers. After spending the 2015–16 season with the Gamblers, Húska began playing for UConn. He spent three seasons at UConn, going 20-38-8 with a 2.90 GAA and a save percentage of .908.

Húska signed a contract with the Rangers after the 2018–19 season with UConn. Between 2019 and 2021 Húska primarily played with the Hartford Wolf Pack of the American Hockey League, as well as making three appearances for HKM Zvolen of the Slovak Extraliga.

Húska began the 2021–22 season with the Hartford Wolf Pack, playing six games for the side before being recalled by the New York Rangers at the beginning of December. On 8 December 2021, Húska made his NHL debut for the Rangers, making 32 saves but conceding seven goals in a 7–3 loss against the Colorado Avalanche. On 9 May 2022 the Rangers sent Húska back to Hartford.

As a free agent from the Rangers, he signed a one-year contract with Russian club, Torpedo Nizhny Novgorod of the KHL, for the 2022–23 season. Húska joined Swiss National League team HC Lugano in October 2024, signing a contract until the end of the 2024–25 season. He played in 13 regular-season games, as well as 5 games in the relegation playoffs, in which Lugano successfully avoided relegation, before being released by the club in March 2025.

On 20 June 2025, Húska returned to the KHL, signing a one-year contract with Admiral Vladivostok.

== International play ==
Húska played for Slovakia at the IIHF World Junior Championship in 2016 and 2017. He was selected to make his full IIHF international debut, participating for Slovakia in the 2021 IIHF World Championship.

== Career statistics ==
=== Regular season and playoffs ===
			Regular season									Playoffs
Season	Team	League	GP	W	L	OT	MIN	GA	SO	GAA	SV%	GP	W	L	MIN	GA	SO	GAA	SV%
2013–14	Team Slovakia U18	Slovak.1	14	—	—	—	748	48	0	3.85	.890	—	—	—	—	—	—	—	—
2014–15	Team Slovakia U18	Slovak.1	24	—	—	—	1296	79	0	3.66	.900	—	—	—	—	—	—	—	—
2014–15	Green Bay Gamblers	USHL	6	0	4	1	304	22	0	4.34	.866	—	—	—	—	—	—	—	—
2015–16	Green Bay Gamblers	USHL	37	26	9	2	2138	65	4	1.82	.931	4	1	3	271	12	0	2.65	.902
2016–17	U. of Connecticut	HE	21	7	9	4	1235	59	1	2.87	.916	—	—	—	—	—	—	—	—
2017–18	U. of Connecticut	HE	27	8	16	2	1530	66	0	2.59	.912	—	—	—	—	—	—	—	—
2018–19	U. of Connecticut	HE	21	5	13	2	1203	67	1	3.34	.896	—	—	—	—	—	—	—	—
2018–19	Hartford Wolf Pack	AHL	9	1	7	1	505	29	0	3.45	.889	—	—	—	—	—	—	—	—
2019–20	Hartford Wolf Pack	AHL	28	11	8	6	1523	77	0	3.03	.894	—	—	—	—	—	—	—	—
2019–20	Maine Mariners	ECHL	3	1	2	0	176	6	0	2.04	.943	—	—	—	—	—	—	—	—
2020–21	HKM Zvolen	Slovak	3	3	0	0	185	7	0	2.27	.921	—	—	—	—	—	—	—	—
2020–21	Hartford Wolf Pack	AHL	13	9	4	0	734	33	0	2.70	.890	—	—	—	—	—	—	—	—
2021–22	Hartford Wolf Pack	AHL	29	10	13	5	1674	78	0	2.80	.902	—	—	—	—	—	—	—	—
2021–22	New York Rangers	NHL	1	0	1	0	60	7	0	7.00	.821	—	—	—	—	—	—	—	—
2022–23	Torpedo Nizhny Novgorod	KHL	28	14	10	2	1622	68	2	2.52	.913	—	—	—	—	—	—	—	—
2023–24	Torpedo Nizhny Novgorod	KHL	45	20	18	2	2475	105	1	2.55	.914	1	0	1	9	3	0	20.49	.700
2024–25	HC Lugano	NL	13	6	6	0	712	34	1	2.86	.899	—	—	—	—	—	—	—	—
2025–26	Admiral Vladivostok	KHL	38	12	18	5	2207	98	2	2.66	.905	—	—	—	—	—	—	—	—
NHL totals			1	0	1	0	60	7	0	7.00	.821	—	—	—	—	—	—	—	—
KHL totals			111	46	46	9	6,303	271	5	2.58	.911	1	0	1	9	3	0	20.49	.700

=== International ===
Year	Team	Event	Result	GP	W	L	T	MIN	GA	SO	GAA	SV%
2014	Slovakia	U18	8th	3	0	2	0	160	8	0	3.00	.905
2014	Slovakia	IH18	8th	3	—	—	—	—	—	—	4.33	.873
2015	Slovakia	U18	7th	5	2	3	0	279	14	0	3.01	.913
2016	Slovakia	WJC	7th	5	1	4	0	293	19	0	3.90	.899
2017	Slovakia	WJC	8th	3	1	2	0	180	15	0	5.00	.873
2021	Slovakia	WC	8th	3	0	2	0	139	10	0	4.32	.855
2022	Slovakia	WC	8th	6	3	3	0	357	17	0	2.86	.891
2025	Slovakia	WC	11th	1	0	0	0	20	2	0	6.00	.833
Junior totals				19	4	11	0	912	56	0	3.68	.895
Senior totals				10	3	5	0	516	29	0	3.37	.878
