= Alex Limoges =

American ice hockey player

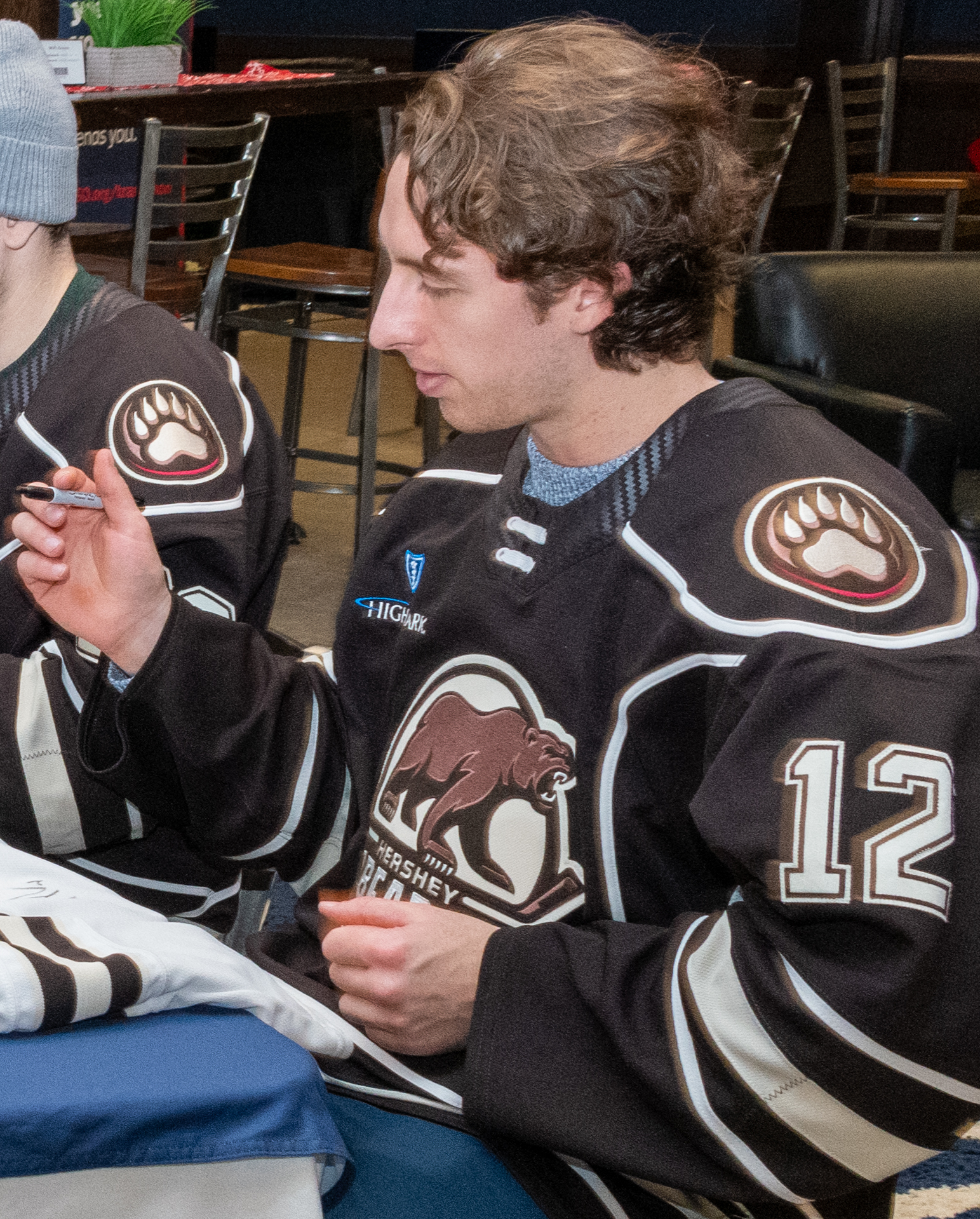
- Limoges with the Hershey Bears in 2023
- Born: September 16, 1997 (age 29) Boulder, Colorado, U.S.
- Height: 6 ft 3 in (191 cm)
- Weight: 216 lb (98 kg; 15 st 6 lb)
- Position: Center
- Shoots: Left
- KHL team Former teams: Dinamo Minsk; San Diego Gulls; Manitoba Moose; Hershey Bears
- NHL draft: Undrafted
- Playing career: 2021–present

Alex Limoges (born September 16, 1997) is an American professional ice hockey center for HC Dinamo Minsk in the Kontinental Hockey League (KHL). He tied for the national lead in scoring while at Penn State in 2018–19.

== Playing career ==
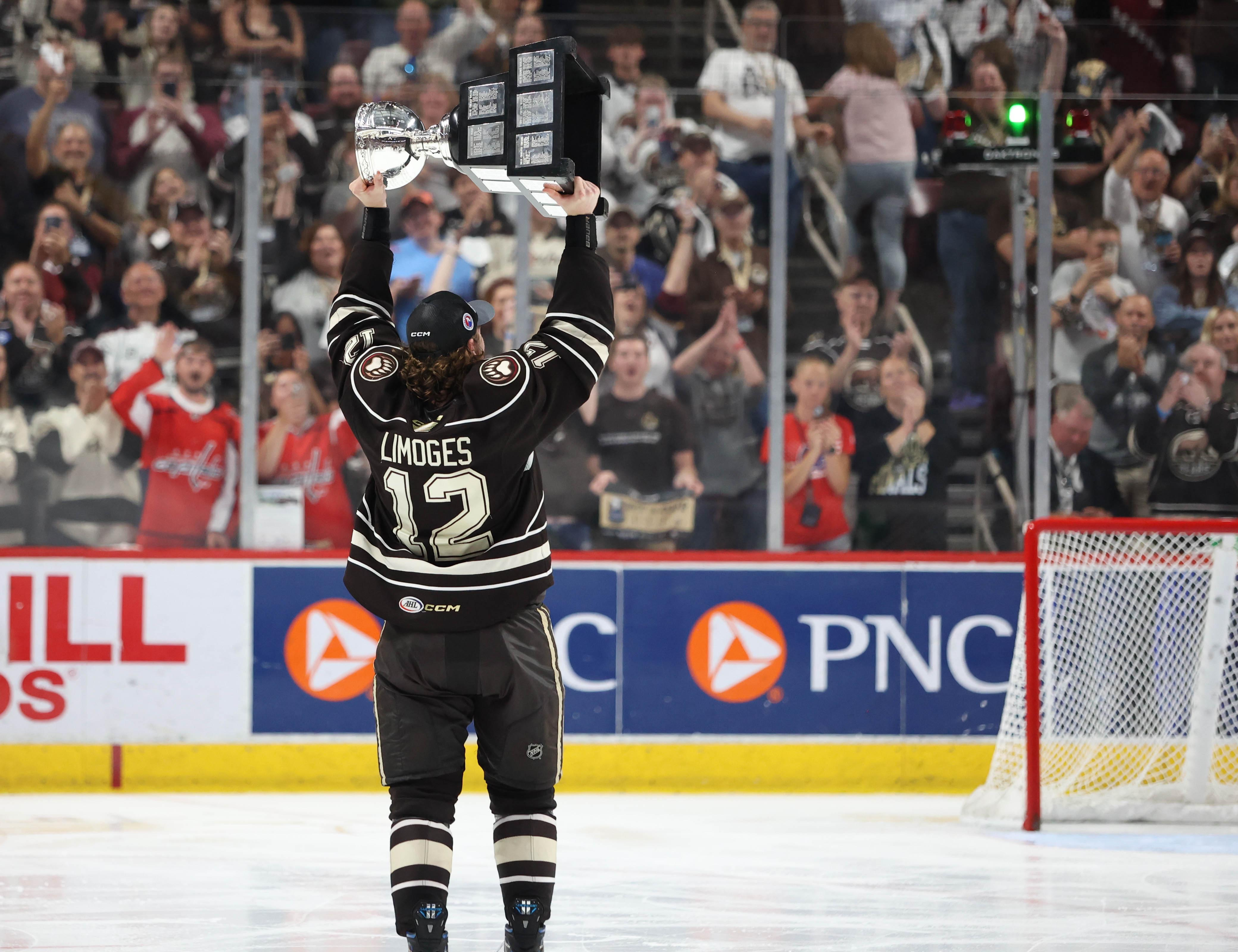
Limoges raising the Calder Cup in 2024

Limoges was a good scorer during his days in junior hockey and helped the Tri-City Storm win the Clark Cup in 2016. He began his college career in 2017 with Penn State and provided complimentary scoring as a freshman. While he couldn't stop the team from winning 7 fewer games than they had the year before, he did join the team for their appearance in the NCAA Tournament. For his sophomore season, Limoges came charging out of the gate and never looked back. Scoring in bunches throughout the season, he broke the program record for the most points in one year and ended up finishing in a tie for the national scoring lead. His exploits led the Nittany Lions to a 22-win season and put them in the Big Ten championship game. Due to the PairWise rankings, both Penn State and their opponent, Notre Dame, needed to win the game to reach the NCAA Tournament. Unfortunately for Limoges, he was held off the scoresheet and PSU fell 2–3.

As an upperclassman, Limoges was unable to continue his high levels of scoring and while he remained one of the team's top forwards, he was never again in contention for the national scoring crown. Despite his declining offensive production, Penn State finished atop the Big Ten in 2020 and were all but guaranteed a return to the NCAA Tournament. Their shot at a championship was wiped away when the COVID-19 pandemic forced the NCAA to cancel all winter and spring tournaments. The pandemic also forced the start of the following season to be delayed, but Limoges returned, this time serving as team captain. While he averages a point per game for the year, Limoges' team was not nearly as sharp as it had been over the previous three seasons and the Nittany Lions finished with a losing record for the first time since 2014.

After Penn State was eliminated from contention, Limoges signed a try-out contract with the San Diego Gulls for the remainder of the season and performed well at the AHL level. He re-signed with the club for the 21–22 season.

As an undrafted free agent following a productive 2021–22 season in the AHL, Limoges was signed to a one-year, entry-level contract with the Winnipeg Jets on July 14, 2022. In the 2022–23 season, Limoges continued his career in the AHL by joining Jets affiliate, the Manitoba Moose, and tallied a career high 34 assists and 54 points through 63 games.

As a free agent at the conclusion of his contract with the Jets, Limoges was signed to a one-year, two-way contract with the Washington Capitals on July 3, 2023.

On July 4, 2024, the Capitals signed Limoges to a one-year, two-way contract for the 2024–25 season. For the second consecutive season he was assigned and played the entirety of the season with AHL affiliate, the Hershey Bears, collecting 44 points through 54 regular season games.

Leaving the Capitals organization following two seasons, Limoges signed his first professional contract abroad after agreeing to a one-year deal with Belarusian club, HC Dinamo Minsk of the KHL, on July 31, 2025.

== Career statistics ==
			Regular season					Playoffs
Season	Team	League	GP	G	A	Pts	PIM	GP	G	A	Pts	PIM
2010–11	Washington Little Caps	AYHL 13U	32	23	15	38	12	—	—	—	—	—
2011–12	Washington Little Caps	AYHL 14U	25	10	10	20	25	—	—	—	—	—
2012–13	Washington Little Caps	AYHL 16U	25	17	13	30	12	—	—	—	—	—
2012–13	Washington Little Caps	T1EHL 16U	40	11	13	24	10	—	—	—	—	—
2013–14	Selects Academy	USPHL 16U	27	25	26	51	10	3	3	2	5	0
2014–15	Selects Academy	USPHL 18U	28	20	39	59	6	4	2	4	6	0
2015–16	Tri-City Storm	USHL	43	14	25	39	2	11	5	9	14	6
2016–17	Tri-City Storm	USHL	36	13	18	31	14	—	—	—	—	—
2016–17	Waterloo Black Hawks	USHL	19	9	16	25	4	8	1	5	6	0
2017–18	Penn State	B1G	37	7	14	21	16	—	—	—	—	—
2018–19	Penn State	B1G	39	23	27	50	10	—	—	—	—	—
2019–20	Penn State	B1G	30	11	21	32	8	—	—	—	—	—
2020–21	Penn State	B1G	22	10	12	22	2	—	—	—	—	—
2020–21	San Diego Gulls	AHL	23	11	10	21	8	3	0	1	1	2
2021–22	San Diego Gulls	AHL	62	23	17	40	13	2	1	1	2	0
2022–23	Manitoba Moose	AHL	63	20	34	54	12	5	1	0	1	0
2023–24	Hershey Bears	AHL	62	24	27	51	18	20	4	9	13	12
2024–25	Hershey Bears	AHL	53	17	27	44	8	8	1	5	6	2
2025–26	Dinamo Minsk	KHL	68	24	49	73	14	8	1	5	6	2
AHL totals			263	95	115	210	59	38	7	16	23	16

== Awards and honors ==
Award	Year
College
Big Ten All-Tournament Team	2019
AHL
Calder Cup	2024

Awards and achievements
Preceded by Adam Gaudette	NCAA Ice Hockey Scoring Champion; 2018–19; With: Taro Hirose	Succeeded by Jack Dugan
