= Brogan Rafferty =

American ice hockey player (b. 1995)

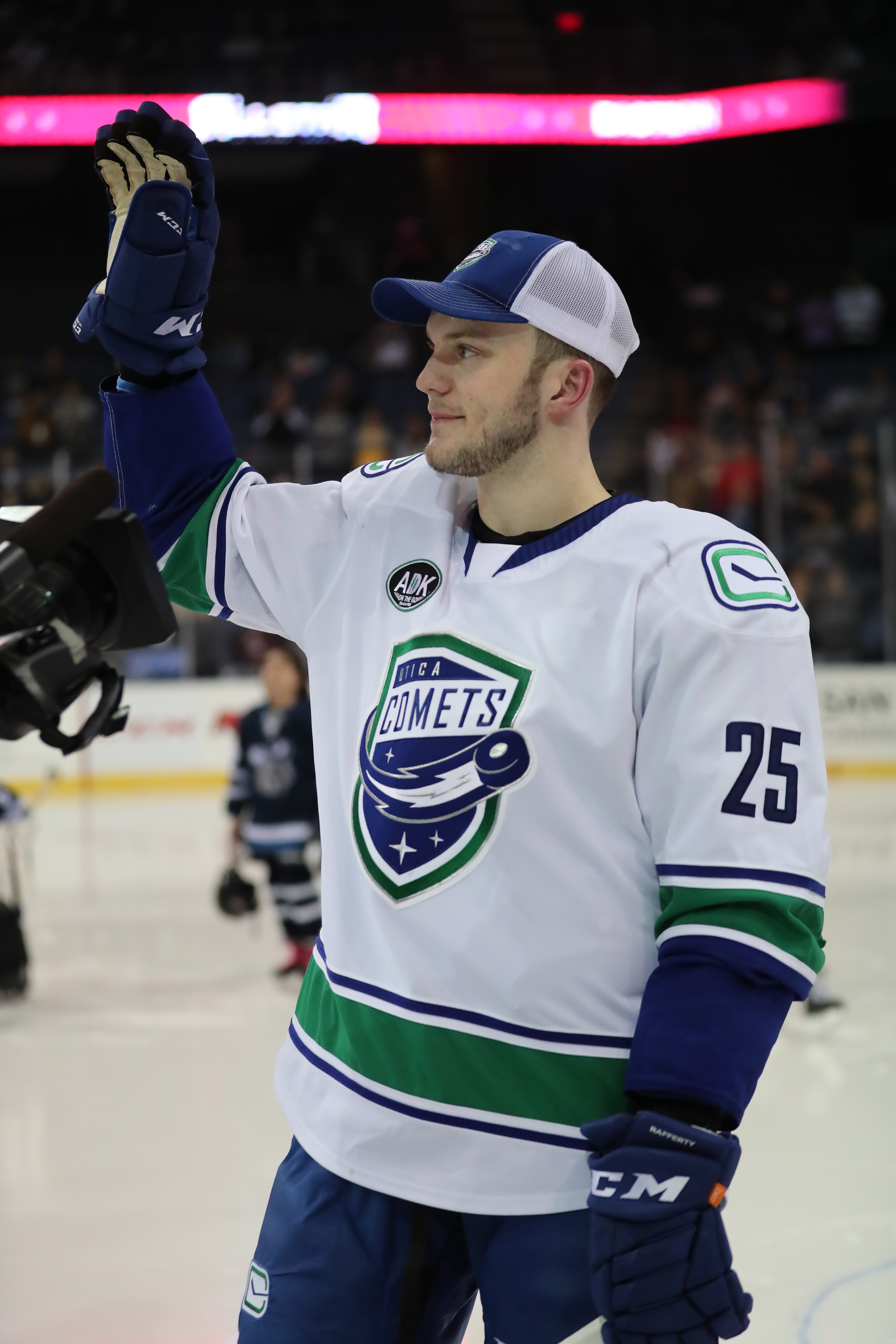
- Rafferty with the Utica Comets in 2020
- Born: May 28, 1995 (age 31) West Dundee, Illinois, U.S.
- Height: 6 ft 2 in (188 cm)
- Weight: 192 lb (87 kg; 13 st 10 lb)
- Position: Defense
- Shoots: Right
- SHL team Former teams: Växjö Lakers; Vancouver Canucks; San Diego Gulls; Coachella Valley Firebirds; Grand Rapids Griffins
- NHL draft: Undrafted
- Playing career: 2019–present

Brogan Rafferty (born May 28, 1995) is an American professional ice hockey defenseman who currently plays for the Växjö Lakers of the Swedish Hockey League (SHL).

Rafferty played as a forward for most of his youth career but chose to switch to defense while in high school. After switching to defense, Rafferty earned attention from various North American Hockey League teams and eventually joined the Coulee Region Chill in 2013–14. After his rookie season with the Chill, Rafferty committed to play NCAA Division I hockey at Quinnipiac University in the Eastern Collegiate Athletic Conference.

Rafferty played for the Quinnipiac Bobcats at Quinnipiac University from 2016 to 2019 while majoring in finance. In his rookie season, Rafferty became the fifth freshman in Quinnipiac's NCAA Division I history to lead the team in assists, and the first since 2011. Following his junior season, Rafferty concluded his collegiate career with the Bobcats by signing a one-year entry-level contract with the Vancouver Canucks of the National Hockey League.

== Early life ==
Rafferty was born on May 28, 1995, in West Dundee, Illinois, United States, to parents Brian and Deirdre. He was born with amblyopia and was later diagnosed with scoliosis. As a young teenager, Rafferty was informed that competitive hockey was not an option for him due to his disabilities. Due to his eye issues, Rafferty wore glasses as a child while playing roller and ice hockey before transitioning to contacts when he was 11 or 12. He refused surgery for his scoliosis and instead worked to build up muscle to support his spine.

== Playing career ==
=== Amateur ===
Growing up in Illinois, Rafferty played as a forward for most of his youth career. Rafferty was playing for the AA team for Team Illinois, but chose to switch to defense after his father printed out a list of undrafted free agents that made it to the NHL. After switching to defense, Rafferty tried out for the AAA team for Team Illinois which also earned him attention from various North American Hockey League (NAHL) teams. His success as a defenseman was also aided with a growth spurt that saw him grow from 5'8 to 6'2. He played one game with the Topeka RoadRunners of the NAHL but spent the majority of the season for the Team Illinois 18U team. In his debut on March 22, 2013, Rafferty scored his first NAHL goal to give the RoadRunners a 1–0 lead in an eventual 4–1 win. After spending the 2012–13 season with the AAA team, Rafferty joined the Coulee Region Chill in 2013–14. In his rookie season with the Chill, Rafferty tallied 22 points through 53 games.

After his rookie season with the Chill, Rafferty tried out for numerous United States Hockey League (USHL) teams and spent a month in training camp before being cut and sent back to the NAHL. Rafferty spent the entirety of the 2014–15 season with the Chill where he continued to produce offensively and impress college scouts. By February 2015, he had tallied two goals and 21 assists through 47 games and was invited to participate in the 2015 NAHL Top Prospects Tournament. As a result of his play, Rafferty committed to play NCAA Division I hockey at Quinnipiac University in the Eastern Collegiate Athletic Conference (ECAC). However, he chose to delay his enrollment for one year to play in the USHL and continue his development. Rafferty subsequently joined the Bloomington Thunder of the USHL for the 2015–16 season where he scored two goals and 26 assists for 28 points through 60 games. His offensive defensive skills helped lead the Thunder to two comeback wins during the USHL 2016 Playoffs against the Dubuque Fighting Saints.

=== Collegiate ===
Rafferty played for the Quinnipiac Bobcats men's ice hockey team at Quinnipiac University from 2016 to 2019 while majoring in finance. While paired with Connor Clifton, Rafferty spent time on the team's first power-play unit and recorded at least one point in 10 of his first 17 games as a freshman. Within his first five games, he scored his first collegiate goal and added four assists. Within two months with the Quinnipiac Bobcats, Rafferty had tallied two goals and 11 assists to rank ninth in the ECAC Hockey conference in points and third in the conference for assists. By February, he had maintained a four-game point streak to lead the Bobcats in assists with 20 and total points with 22. Rafferty subsequently became the fifth freshman in Quinnipiac's NCAA Division I history to lead the team in assists, and the first since 2011. His offensive skills helped the Bobcats finish the 2016–17 season ranked 20th after posting a 23–15–2 record including a 13-8-1 mark in ECAC Hockey play. As the Bobcats competed in the 2017 ECAC Hockey men's ice hockey tournament, Rafferty recorded an assist in their 5–1 win over Brown University in Game 2 of the First Round series. The team was eventually eliminated from the tournament in the semi-finals after falling to Harvard University. Rafferty finished the season by earning ECAC Hockey All-Academic Team honors.

Following his freshman season, Rafferty was invited to participate in the Chicago Blackhawks National Hockey League (NHL) Development Camp as a free-agent invitee. He was subsequently cut from the camp and returned to the Bobcats for the 2017–18 season. Before the start of his sophomore campaign, the Bobcats were ranked 14th in the USCHO.com Preseason Poll. The team began the season with a 1–1–1 record, during which Rafferty picked up his assist against the University of Vermont in a 3–2 win on October 14. Rafferty helped the Bobcats qualify for the 2018 ECAC Hockey men's ice hockey tournament where they competed against Yale University and Cornell University. In their first-round series against Yale, Rafferty tallied a goal and an assist in the 5–1 and 4–1 wins to qualify for the Quarterfinal round. As they fell to Cornell in the second round, Rafferty recorded four shots in the eventual 2–0 sweep.

During the summer before his junior season, Rafferty was invited to participate at the New York Rangers NHL Development Camp as a free-agent invitee. He returned to the Bobcats before the 2018–19 season where he recorded his second 20-point season with four goals and 20 assists for 24 points through 38 games. In October, Rafferty was assessed a charging penalty after hitting UConn freshman Ruslan Iskhakov which left him motionless on the ice for minutes before being stretchered off. Rafferty began the season strong by recording a three-game point streak and maintaining a team-leading nine assists in the month of November. He continued to produce near the conclusion of the regular season as he recorded 12 points over his final 14 games. His late offensive output helped the Bobcats win their fourth Cleary Cup and clinch the top seed in the 2019 ECAC Hockey men's ice hockey tournament. Despite their high ranking, the Bobcats were swept by Brown University in the ECAC Hockey Quarterfinals.

=== Professional ===
Rafferty concluded his collegiate career with the Bobcats by signing a one-year entry-level contract with the Vancouver Canucks on April 1, 2019. Due to a quirk in the NHL's contract rules and because Rafferty's one-year deal was signed with just 4 days left in the season, his cap hit was $5.1 million, despite his total salary being just $925,000. He played in his first National Hockey League game in the final stages of the 2018–19 season, on April 4 against the Nashville Predators, finishing with one shot on goal in 12:03 played. At the end of the season, the Canucks extended a qualifying offer to Rafferty to retain his negotiating rights.

Rafferty attended the Canucks training camp prior to the 2019–20 season but began the season on their American Hockey League (AHL) affiliate, the Utica Comets. During his first month with the Comets, Rafferty helped the team remain undefeated while also scoring his first professional AHL goal and leading the league in plus/minus. By December, Rafferty had led all league rookies with 16 points through 22 games, on pace for a 55-point season. His point production increased during December and he finished 2019 ranking third in the league with 25 assists while leading all league defensemen with 30 points. As a result of his productive month, Rafferty was recognized as the AHL Rookie of the Month for December. He was also added to the AHL All-Star Game roster alongside teammate Reid Boucher. In February 2020, Rafferty surpassed Bobby Sanguinetti to claim the Comet's new single-season points leader by a defenseman with 41 points. At the time the season was paused due to the COVID-19 pandemic, the Comets had a record of 34–22–3–2 to rank third in the North Division and tied for 10th overall. Rafferty finished the season earning 2019-20 AHL All-Rookie Team honors after accumulating seven goals and 38 assists for 48 points through 57 games. He was also named to the 2019–20 Second All-Star Team. Once the season was canceled, Rafferty joined the Canucks in the playoff bubble as they played in the Stanley Cup qualifiers.

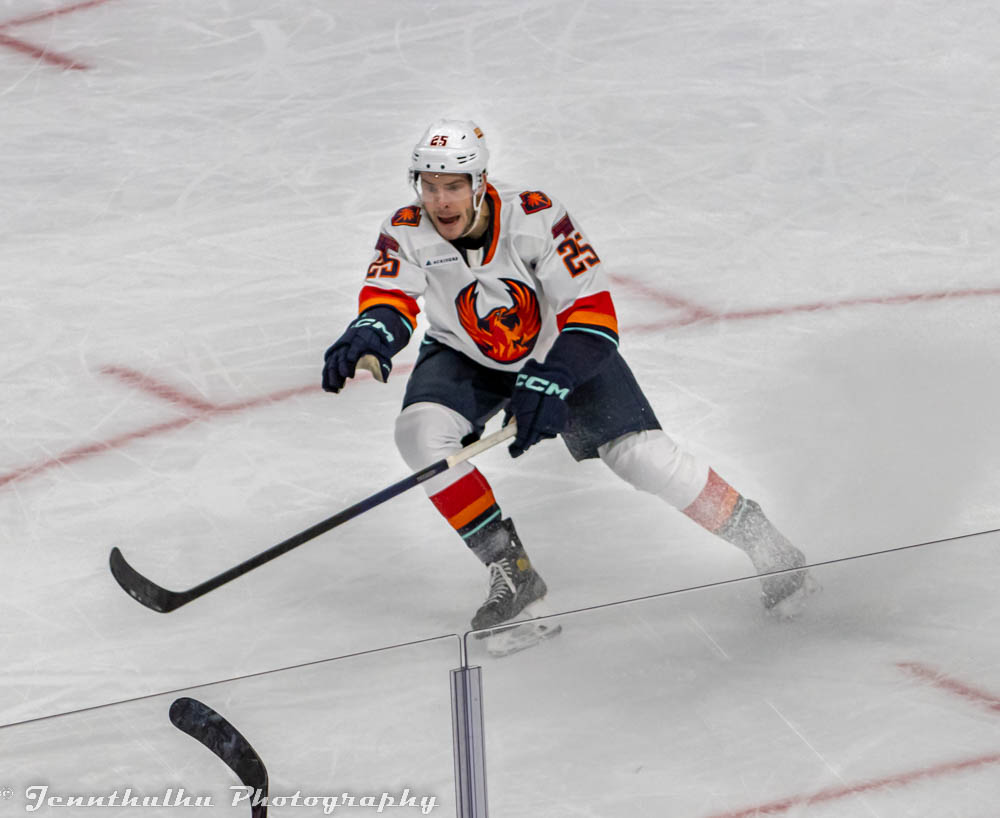
Rafferty during a game with the Coachella Valley Firebirds in 2022.

Once the Canucks were eliminated from the 2020 Stanley Cup playoffs, Rafferty returned to the NHL level in the pandemic-delayed 2020–21 season. He was a mainstay of the Canucks taxi squad alongside Jack Rathbone, Marc Michaelis, Guillaume Brisebois, and Michael DiPietro. As a member of the squad, Rafferty made his season debut on January 21 where he recorded his first NHL point, an assist, in a 7–3 loss to the Montreal Canadiens. At the conclusion of the season, Rafferty signed a one-year, $750,000 contract with division rivals, the Anaheim Ducks, on July 28, 2021. Rafferty attended the Ducks training camp before the 2021–22 season but was reassigned to their AHL affiliate, the San Diego Gulls on October 6. Although the Gulls started the season with a 0–3 record, he led the team with three points on the power play unit while averaging a point per game. He also maintained a three-game point streak through the losing span and was tied for third in the league in power-play points. In January 2022, Rafferty was recalled to the NHL level as Cam Fowler was placed on the COVID-19/non-roster list. He did not make his season debut during the recall and shortly thereafter rejoined the Gulls in the AHL. Rafferty continued to produce into February as he recorded two points through four games to help the Gulls maintain a 3–1–0 record. However, the Gulls did not maintain this momentum towards the end of the season and occurred a seven-game losing streak before Rafferty scored to help snap the streak on April 23. Despite their losing streak, the Gulls qualified for the 2022 Calder Cup playoffs but lost in the first round to the Ontario Reign.

After a lone season within the Ducks organization, Rafferty was signed as a free agent to a one-year, two-way contract with the Seattle Kraken on July 13, 2022. Following the signing, Rafferty was reassigned to the Kraken's AHL affiliate, the Coachella Valley Firebirds, for the 2022–23 season.

On July 1, 2023, Rafferty signed as a free agent to a two-year, two-way contract with the Detroit Red Wings.

== Personal life ==
Rafferty shares the same name with the Craigslist Killer, Brogan Rafferty. As such, an Ohio news station ran a photo of Brogan Rafferty the hockey player on their newscast saying he was Brogan Rafferty the killer. Rafferty is a practicing Christian.

== Career statistics ==
			Regular season					Playoffs
Season	Team	League	GP	G	A	Pts	PIM	GP	G	A	Pts	PIM
2012–13	Topeka Roadrunners	NAHL	1	1	1	2	0	—	—	—	—	—
2013–14	Coulee Region Chill	NAHL	53	3	19	22	55	—	—	—	—	—
2014–15	Coulee Region Chill	NAHL	56	4	28	32	50	5	1	0	1	6
2015–16	Bloomington Thunder	USHL	60	2	26	28	30	10	3	6	9	4
2016–17	Quinnipiac University	ECAC	40	2	22	24	18	—	—	—	—	—
2017–18	Quinnipiac University	ECAC	38	4	13	17	22	—	—	—	—	—
2018–19	Quinnipiac University	ECAC	38	4	20	24	60	—	—	—	—	—
2018–19	Vancouver Canucks	NHL	2	0	0	0	0	—	—	—	—	—
2019–20	Utica Comets	AHL	57	7	38	45	12	—	—	—	—	—
2020–21	Vancouver Canucks	NHL	1	0	1	1	0	—	—	—	—	—
2021–22	San Diego Gulls	AHL	65	4	20	24	36	2	0	0	0	0
2022–23	Coachella Valley Firebirds	AHL	72	9	42	51	42	26	2	9	11	4
2023–24	Grand Rapids Griffins	AHL	62	13	16	29	8	9	0	4	4	4
2024–25	Grand Rapids Griffins	AHL	52	6	13	19	17	1	0	0	0	0
2025–26	Växjö Lakers	SHL	48	12	24	36	6	9	2	4	6	4
NHL totals			3	0	1	1	0	—	—	—	—	—

== Awards and honors ==
Awards	Year
AHL
Rookie of the Month	December 2019
All-Star Game	2020
AHL All-Rookie Team	2020
Second All-Star Team	2020
