= Nebraska Cranes =

- League: USBL 2005–2006
- Founded: 2005
- History: Nebraska Cranes; 2005–2006
- Arena: Kearney Events Center
- Location: Kearney, Nebraska
- Team colors: Red, white, royal blue, gold
- Head coach: Brian Walsh
- Ownership: Joel Weins
- Championships: 1 USBL (2006)

The Nebraska Cranes were a United States Basketball League team located in Kearney, Nebraska.

== History ==
In the team's second season, the Cranes won the USBL championship by defeating the defending champion Dodge City Legend with Nick Galef being named as the Championship MVP.

Their second season turned out to be their last, as they did not return for the 2007 season. The most recent head coach was Brian Walsh.

== Seasons ==
Stagione	League	Name	W	L	%	Place	Play-off
2005	USBL	Nebraska Cranes	14	16	46,7	4º	Semifinals
2006	USBL	Nebraska Cranes	17	13	56,7	3º	Champions
