= Viaero Center =

Sports arena in Kearney, Nebraska, U.S.

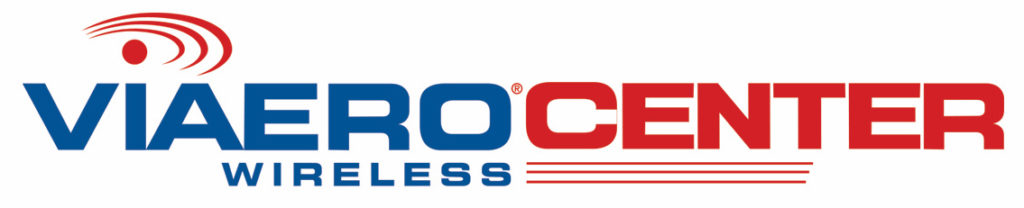

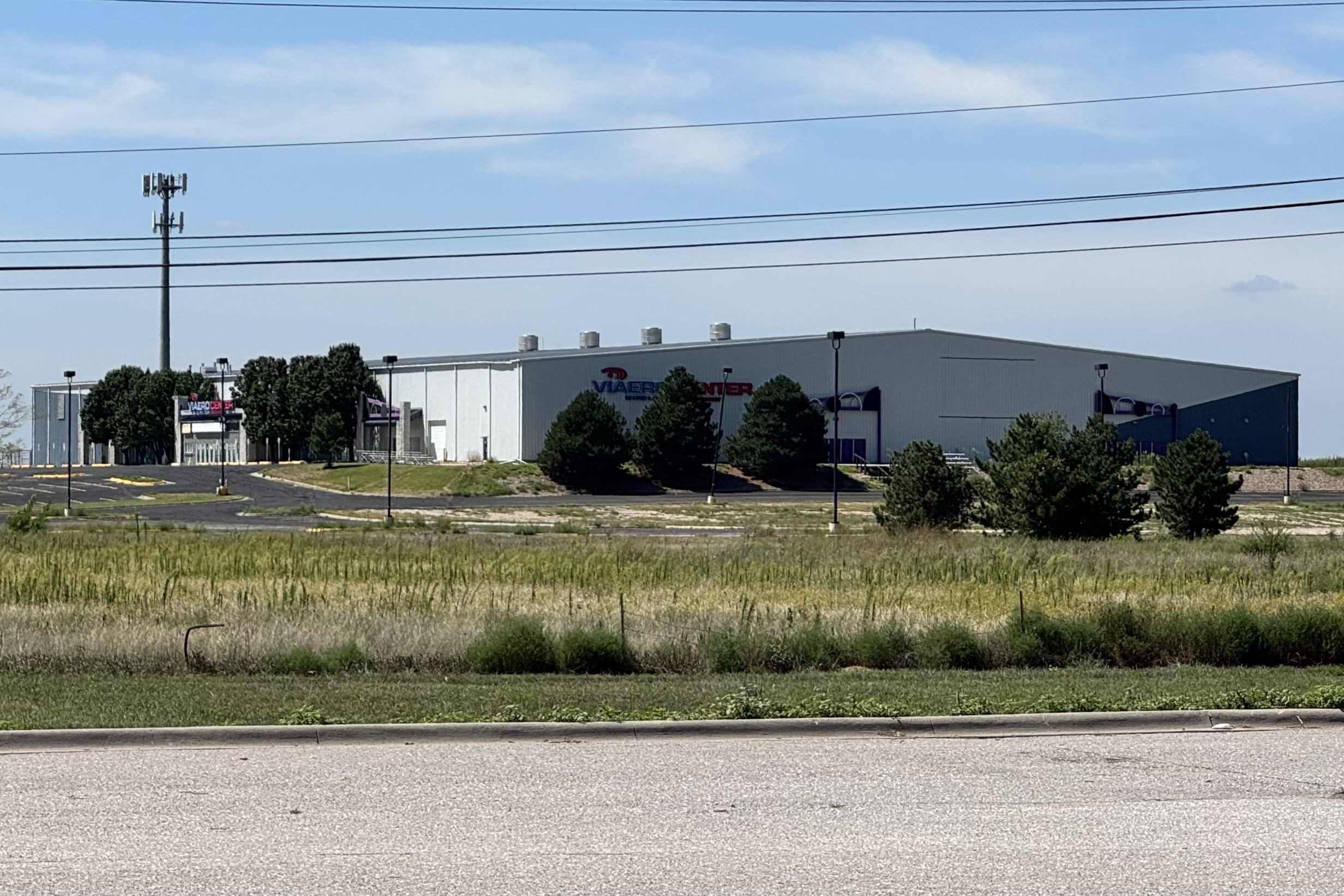
- Viaero Center in 2026
- Interactive map of Viaero Center
- Former names: Tri-City Arena (2000–2004); Kearney Event Center (2004–2006); FirsTier Event Center (2006–2009)
- Location: 609 Platte Road; Kearney, Nebraska, U.S.
- Coordinates: 40.667014675858816°N 99.09254376737702°W
- Owner: Storm Hockey, LLC
- Operator: Storm Hockey, LLC
- Capacity: 5,000

Construction
- Groundbreaking: November 1999
- Opened: November 18, 2000
- Cost: $10.5 million ($19.6 million in 2025 dollars)

Tenants
- Tri-City Storm (USHL) (2000–present); Tri-City Diesel (NIFL) (2001–2004); Nebraska Cranes (USBL) (2005–2006); Tri-City Horsemen (AAL) (2027–future)

Viaero Center, locally referred to as Vee Arena, and previously known as the Kearney Event Center and FirsTier Event Center, is a 5,000-seat multi-purpose arena in Kearney, Nebraska. The arena was announced as the Kearney Arena in 1998, before changing its name to Tri-City Arena upon opening in November 2000. The arena adopted its current name in 2009, after the naming rights were purchased by Viaero Wireless.

It is home to the 2016 USHL Clark Cup Champions Tri-City Storm ice hockey, and former teams, the Nebraska Cranes basketball and Tri-City Diesel arena football. Seating capacity for hockey, basketball and arena football is 4,047. The arena features 20 luxury suites and also plays host to concerts, trade shows, conventions and other events.

== History ==
In August 1998, plans were announced to build a hockey arena in Kearney, Nebraska. Plans were supercharged by a $3 million investment offer to help build the arena. During development, a dispute between developers and Buffalo County over if the county could have involvement in development began. It was ruled in 1999 that the county can have involvement in the project.

Ground was broken in November 1999 with construction commencing shortly after. By early 2000, the private investment group involved in the project announced their intent to pull out of the project, largely due to the dispute with Buffalo County. The Kearney Arena officially opened on November 18, 2000 as the Tri-City Arena.

The arena lost $2.1 million between 2001 and 2003. By 2004, their contract with the Tri-City Storm came into question, as they were unsure on if the arena would close or not. In 2004, the Tri-City Arena rebranded to the Kearney Event Center. Additionally, two firms, Global Entertainment Corp. and Compass Facility Management Incorporated, would take over as managers for the arena.

In 2009, it was announced that the arena would change its name to Viaero Event Center, after failed negotiations with FirstTierBank and then-owner Kirk Brooks.

== Events ==
Since its inception in 1998, Viaero Center was meant specifically to house sports teams. The 2016 USHL Clark Cup Champions Tri-City Storm have used it as its home arena since their founding in 2000. The arena also housed the former indoor football team, Tri-City Diesel from 2001 to 2004. The arena was also home to the basketball team Nebraska Cranes from 2005 to 2006. Viaero Center has also been host of an annual Freedom Fest.
