= Wade Allison (ice hockey) =

Canadian ice hockey player

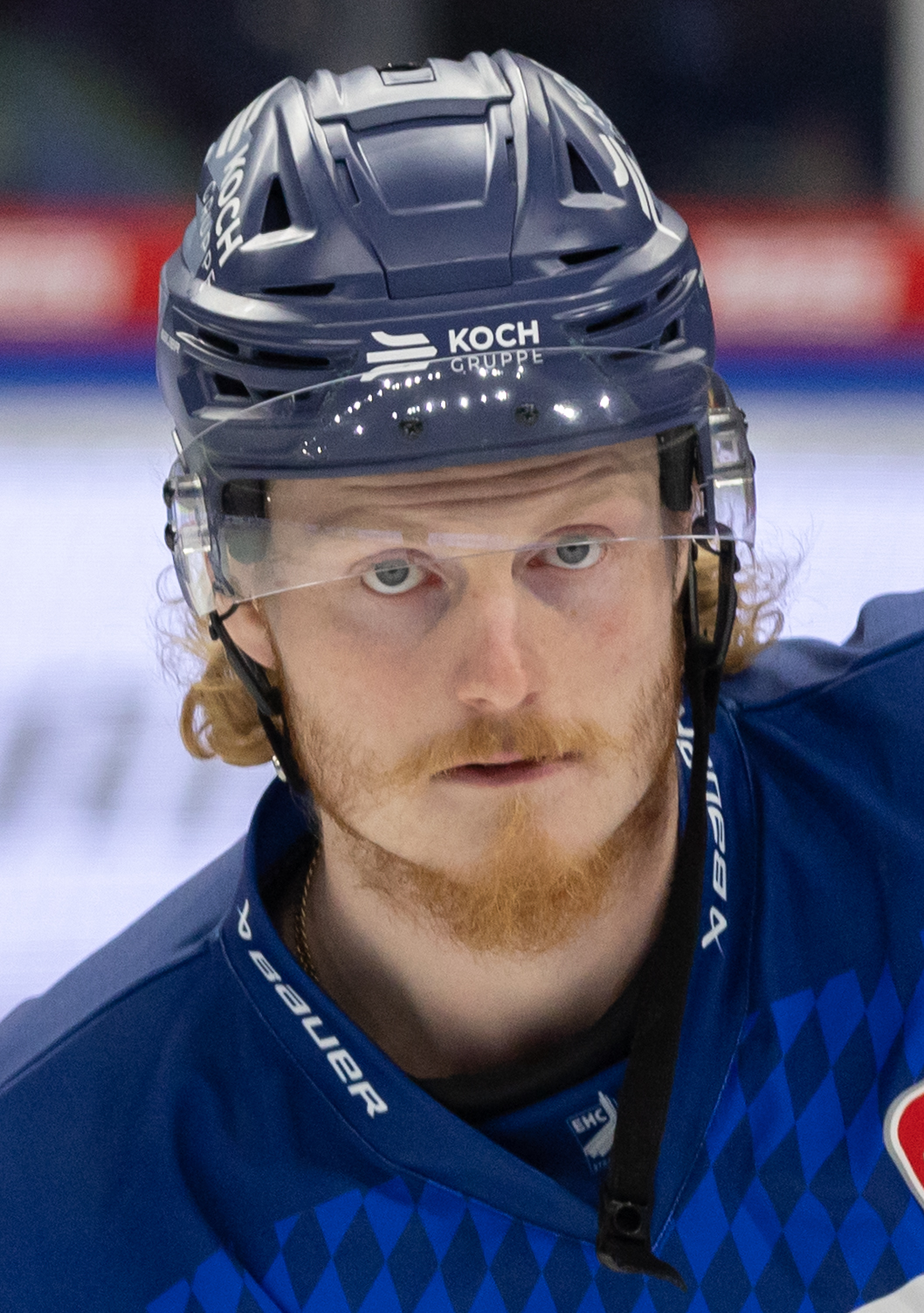
- Allison in 2026
- Born: October 14, 1997 (age 29) Carman, Manitoba, Canada
- Height: 6 ft 2 in (188 cm)
- Weight: 205 lb (93 kg; 14 st 9 lb)
- Position: Right wing
- Shoots: Right
- DEL team Former teams: Straubing Tigers; Philadelphia Flyers; Barys Astana
- NHL draft: 52nd overall, 2016; Philadelphia Flyers
- Playing career: 2021–present

Wade Allison (born October 14, 1997) is a Canadian professional ice hockey right winger for the Milano Hockey Club of the win2day International Central European Hockey League (ICE Hockey League). He previously played for the Philadelphia Flyers of the National Hockey League (NHL), Barys Astana of the Kontinental Hockey League (KHL) and Straubing Tigers of the Deutsche Eishockey Liga (DEL). The Flyers selected Allison in the second round, 52nd overall, of the 2016 NHL entry draft.

== Early life ==
Allison was born October 14, 1997, on a 200-acre agricultural plot in Myrtle, Manitoba, just outside of Carman. He played two seasons with the Tri-City Storm in the United States Hockey League, and was one of the team members who won the Clark Cup in the 2015–16 USHL season. The next day, Allison was named as the MVP of the Clark Cup Playoffs.

== Playing career ==
=== Amateur ===
In 2015, Allison committed to playing college ice hockey at Western Michigan University. He drew attention in his freshman year in the Broncos program, finishing his season with 29 points on 12 goals and 17 assists, as well as a playoff appearance. On December 9, 2017, Allison netted his second hat trick of the 2017–18 season, becoming one of two NCAA players to score multiple hat tricks that season.

On January 13, 2018, Allison suffered an anterior cruciate ligament injury in a game against St. Cloud State University, and did not return to play until midway through his junior year. During the 2019–20 season, Allison was named as an alternate captain for the Broncos. Later that season, Allison suffered a shoulder injury, and only appeared in 26 games, over the course of which he scored 10 goals and 23 points. While the Broncos qualified for the 2020 NCHC Tournament, all playoff games were canceled on March 12, 2020, due to the COVID-19 pandemic.

=== Professional ===
==== Philadelphia Flyers (2020–2024) ====
On June 25, 2016, Allison was selected in the second round of the 2016 NHL entry draft, 52nd overall, by the Philadelphia Flyers. He was given the option to begin professional hockey before completing his college career, but elected to continue playing at WMU, citing a desire to monitor his ACL injury, as well as a perceived opportunity to play in the NCAA Division I Men's Ice Hockey Tournament.

On March 27, 2020, the Flyers signed Allison to an entry-level contract. Allison suffered an undisclosed injury during the Flyers training camp and started the 2020–21 season on the injury reserve.

Allison made his NHL debut on April 15, 2021, against the Pittsburgh Penguins. He scored his first NHL goal in the next game, on April 17, in a 6–3 loss against the Washington Capitals.

==== Nashville Predators (2024) ====
On March 8, 2024, the Flyers traded Allison to the Nashville Predators in exchange for Denis Gurianov. He did not feature in a game with the Predators, playing out the season with AHL affiliate, the Milwaukee Admirals, posting three goals and five points through 14 regular season games.

==== Barys Astana (2024) ====
Released as a free agent by the Predators, Allison signed his first contract abroad in agreeing to a one-year deal with Barys Astana of the Kontinental Hockey League (KHL) on July 12, 2024. In the 2024–25 season, Allison made just 12 appearances with Barys in registering only two goals, before he mutually agreed to terminate the remainder his contract on November 4.

==== Straubing Tigers (2025–present) ====
On September 13, 2025, the Straubing Tigers of the Deutsche Eishockey Liga (DEL) signed Allison to a contract for the 2025–26 season.

== Playing style ==
Allison is considered a power forward, with Colorado College Tigers head coach Mike Haviland comparing his playing style to that of Troy Brouwer. Flyers assistant general manager Brent Flahr has described him as possessing "a great package of size, speed, and skill."

== Career statistics ==
			Regular season					Playoffs
Season	Team	League	GP	G	A	Pts	PIM	GP	G	A	Pts	PIM
2014–15	Tri-City Storm	USHL	35	6	7	13	8	7	0	2	2	0
2015–16	Tri-City Storm	USHL	56	25	22	47	46	11	9	7	16	4
2016–17	Western Michigan University	NCHC	36	12	17	29	53	—	—	—	—	—
2017–18	Western Michigan University	NCHC	22	15	15	30	29	—	—	—	—	—
2018–19	Western Michigan University	NCHC	22	8	7	15	20	—	—	—	—	—
2019–20	Western Michigan University	NCHC	26	10	13	23	17	—	—	—	—	—
2020–21	Lehigh Valley Phantoms	AHL	10	4	5	9	9	—	—	—	—	—
2020–21	Philadelphia Flyers	NHL	14	4	3	7	4	—	—	—	—	—
2021–22	Lehigh Valley Phantoms	AHL	28	10	7	17	4	—	—	—	—	—
2021–22	Philadelphia Flyers	NHL	1	0	0	0	0	—	—	—	—	—
2022–23	Philadelphia Flyers	NHL	60	9	6	15	36	—	—	—	—	—
2023–24	Lehigh Valley Phantoms	AHL	46	10	7	17	44	—	—	—	—	—
2023–24	Milwaukee Admirals	AHL	14	3	2	5	7	4	1	1	2	2
2024–25	Barys Astana	KHL	12	2	0	2	16	—	—	—	—	—
NHL totals			75	13	9	22	40	—	—	—	—	—
