= Tri-City Storm =

American junior ice hockey team

- City: Kearney, Nebraska
- League: USHL
- Conference: Western
- Founded: 1971
- Home arena: Viaero Center
- Colors: Purple, black, silver
- Owner: Dave Vennetti
- Head coach: John Torchetti
- Media: Grand Island Independent; KHGI-TV; KSNB-TV; Kearney Hub

Franchise history
- 1971–1972: Minnesota Jr. Stars
- 1972–1973: St. Paul Jr. Stars
- 1973–1995: St. Paul Vulcans
- 1995–2000: Twin Cities Vulcans
- 2000–present: Tri-City Storm

Championships
- Regular season titles: 3 Anderson Cups (2003–04, 2018–19, 2021-22)
- Division titles: 1 (2003–04)
- Conference titles: 1 (2015–16)
- Playoff championships: 1 Clark Cups (2016)

The Tri-City Storm is a junior ice hockey team based in Kearney, Nebraska, that plays in the Western Conference of the United States Hockey League (USHL). Its name refers to the three central Nebraskan cities of Kearney, Hastings, and Grand Island.

== History ==
=== Founding under Ted Baer ===
On May 15, 1999, the USHL unanimously voted to allow then Omaha Lancers' owner, Ted Baer, to place a new team in Kearney, Nebraska, for the 2000–01 season. In September 1999, Jim Hillman was named the team's first head coach. The Tri-City Storm won its first game on September 30, 2000. The Storm finally played its first home game on November 18, 2000, after eight months of construction on the Tri-City Arena. The Storm was named USHL Organization of the Year in its first year of operation.

The Storm narrowly missed the playoffs in its second season. In the following 2002–03 season, during the midst of a 10-game losing streak in mid-December, Jim Hillman resigned as coach and general manager. He was replaced by former Topeka Scarecrows head coach, Bliss Littler, in January. The Storm rallied to make the playoffs with a seven-game win streak down the stretch.

The team had its best season in 2003–04 and won the Anderson Cup for the best regular season record, finishing with a record of 43–12–5 and 91 points. The team featured future National Hockey League players Bill Thomas, Mark Van Guilder, and Peter Mannino. The Storm made its first Clark Cup final, but was eliminated in four games by the Waterloo Black Hawks. Tri-City was named "Organization of the Year" by the USHL for the second time.

Tri-City made the division finals again in the following season despite a fourth place finish in the division. It qualified for the playoffs for the fourth consecutive season, narrowly beating out Sioux City for the final spot in the division. The Storm lost in the opening round playoff series three-games-to-two against the Sioux Falls Stampede.

=== Organization under Joel Wiens ===
On May 3, 2006, owner Ted Baer sold the Storm to Joel Wiens after seven years. The Storm finished the 2006–07 regular season with 78 points, giving the team a second place finish in the West Division. The team then won a seven-game series against Sioux City, but was knocked out of the playoffs by the eventual Clark Cup champions, the Sioux Falls Stampede.

The Storm failed to qualify for the playoffs for the first time in six seasons in 2007–08. After the season, head coach and general manager Bliss Littler resigned to accept the head coaching position with the Omaha Lancers. Assistant coach Tom Rudrud was promoted to head coach. The Storm then had their worst season to date, winning just 11 out of 60 games that included a franchise-worst 19-game losing streak.

=== Brooks' ownership ===
In April 2009, Wiens sold the arena and team to Las Vegas businessman Kirk Brooks. Brooks announced that Drew Schoneck had replaced Tom Rudrud as head coach. In the 2009–10 season, forward Jaden Schwartz led the league with 50 assists and 83 points. The Storm finished fourth place in the West Division with a 29–25–6 record. The Storm was swept in the first round of the playoffs by former coach Bliss Littler and the Omaha Lancers in three games. The St. Louis Blues selected Schwartz in the first round, 14th overall, the highest Storm selection at that time.

In 2010–11, the Storm finished last in the Western Conference. After another slow start in 2011–12, head coach Drew Schoneck was relieved of his duties and assistant coach Josh Hauge was promoted. Under Hauge, the Storm rallied late in the season and was able to clinch a playoff spot, finishing in sixth in the Western Conference. The Waterloo Black Hawks defeated Tri-City in the first round of the postseason. In Hauge's first full season behind the bench, injuries plagued the Storm and the team again finished last in their conference. Captain Brian Ward had a strong season offensively, scoring 54 points in just 42 games. Mike Vecchione led the team with 26 goals.

After 15 games into the 2013–14 season, Hauge was fired and replaced by Jim Hulton. The team missed the playoffs for the second straight season. The following season, and first full season under Hulton, would lead the Storm to a second place finish within its conference. Tri-City's Chris Wilkie scored 35 goals, tying Rastislav Spirko (2003–04) for the Storm's single-season record. The Storm swept the Omaha Lancers, 3-games-to-0, in the first round. The team then faced Sioux Falls in the conference finals. Led by USHL Rookie of the Year Kieffer Bellows, the Stampede beat the Storm, 3-games-to-1. The Storm won the first game, but before game two, an ice maintenance worker accidentally drilled a hole in a pipe causing water to burst onto the ice. Game Two was postponed from Saturday, April 25 to Wednesday, April 29. After the five-day break, Sioux Falls won three straight games.

==== Clark Cup championship 2015–16 ====
Head coach and general manager Jim Hulton was relieved of his duties in the 2015 off-season and replaced by Bill Muckalt. The former five-year NHL veteran came to the Storm following a four-year stint as assistant coach at Michigan Tech. In 2015–16, the team had its best start since 2003–04, winning its first four games. The Storm went on a team-record 13-game point streak from February 6 to March 19 and the best record in the Western Conference for the first time since 2003–04. The Storm finished with 73 points and a 28–15–10–7 record. Twenty of the Storm's 60 games went to overtime, and the Storm lost 17 of them (10 in overtime), the Tier I USHL record for most losses past regulation. The Storm took a club-low 726 penalty minutes, fewest in the USHL that season. Goaltender Jake Kielly set the Storm's single-season record for best save percentage (.919) and went on a 19-game point streak during the middle of the season. Mattias Goransson finished the regular season with 34 assists, the Storm defensemen record.

During the 2016 Clark Cup playoffs, the Storm swept the Sioux Falls Stampede, 3–0, in the Western Conference semifinals, outscoring the Stampede, 12–3. In the Western Conference finals, the Storm beat Waterloo in a full five-game series, earning its second Clark Cup finals appearance. In the finals, the Storm faced the Dubuque Fighting Saints in a best-of-five series, sweeping the Fighting Saints in three games and won the Clark Cup for the first time. The Storm outscored the Fighting Saints 13–4 with the line of Dan Labosky, Alex Limoges, and Wade Allison on ice for 11 of 13 Storm goals. Wade Allison was named Clark Cup most valuable player and the Philadelphia Flyers selected him in the second round of the 2016 NHL entry draft. Goaltender Jake Kielly set the Tier I USHL postseason record with a .950 save percentage and also had a 1.64 goals against average. Bill Muckalt became the fifth head coach in the Tier I history of the USHL to deliver a championship in his first season.

==== After the championship: 2016–present ====
In the following 2016–17 season, the Storm finished last in the conference with a 21–31–6–2 record. The Storm started the season with points in three straight games (2–0–0–1) and was 7–5–1–2 a quarter of the way through the season. From December 1 through the end of the season, Tri-City went 14–26–5–0. The Storm made a number of mid-season trades aimed at building for the future. On February 6, the Storm moved assistant captain Joey Matthews, second-leading scorer Charlie Kelleher, and Odeen Tufto to Sioux City for draft picks and a player to be named later. The same day, Tri-City executed two separate trades with Waterloo, moving captain Alex Limoges (for forward Caleb Rule, a draft pick and a player to be named later) and starting goaltender Dayton Rasmussen (for D Tyler Borsch). After the trades, the Storm went 6–12–1–0. Tri-City sent a league-high five players to the 2017 USHL/NHL Top Prospects Game and forward Paul Washe was named Team West MVP (two goals) in Sioux Falls. Washe became the second straight Storm player to win Team West MVP after Wade Allison in 2016. Three Storm players (Alex Limoges, Paul Washe, Dayton Rasmussen) won the Gold Medal with the US Junior Select Team at the 2016 World Junior A Challenge in Bonnyville, Alberta.

Prior to the 2017–18 season, Muckalt left the Storm to become the associate head coach at his alma mater, the University of Michigan. Former Youngstown Phantoms and Orlando Solar Bears head coach, Anthony Noreen, was named as his replacement. Noreen led the team to an Anderson Cup regular season championship in 2018–19 and won USHL Coach of the Year. The 2019–20 season was cut short due to the COVID-19 pandemic, but the Storm still extended Noreen's contract through 2023–24.

== Alumni ==
Notable former players who have continued to play professionally include Mason Appleton, Blake Coleman, Christian Hanson, Jack Hillen, Matthew Knies, Nick Lappin, Jarod Palmer, Scott Parse, Jaden Schwartz, Bill Thomas, and Mike Vecchione.

Thomas and Konrad Reeder are tied for the most goals in team history, each scoring 60 during their careers in Kearney. Mario Lamoureux, who played four seasons for the Storm, has the all-time assists record with 85.

Schwartz, who played for the Storm during the 2009–10 season, owns most of the team's single season records including assists (50), points (83), power play goals (16), power play assists (22), power play points (38), shorthanded points (8), multi-point games (24), consecutive multi-point games (6) and total shots on goal (242).

== Season-by-season record ==
Season	GP	W	L	OTL	SOL	Pts	GF	GA	Finish	Playoffs
2000–01	56	27	21	8	—	62	191	179	5th of 6, West; 7th of 12, USHL	Won Quarterfinals, 3–1 vs. Green Bay Gamblers; Lost Semifinals, 0–3 vs. Lincoln Stars
2001–02	61	27	30	4	—	58	182	208	5th of 7, West; 9th of 13, USHL	did not qualify
2002–03	60	27	28	2	3	59	183	200	5th of 6, West; 8th of 11, USHL	Lost Quarterfinals, 0–3 vs. Lincoln Stars
2003–04	60	43	12	1	4	91	225	138	1st of 6, West; 1st of 12, USHL	Won Div. Semifinals, 3–0 vs. Des Moines Buccaneers; Won Div. Finals, 3–1 vs. Sioux City Musketeers; Lost Clark Cup Finals, 1–3 vs. Waterloo Black Hawks
2004–05	60	33	21	3	3	72	189	172	4th of 5, West; 5th of 11, USHL	Won Div. Semifinals, 3–2 vs. Omaha Lancers; Lost Div. Finals, 1–3 vs. Sioux City Musketeers
2005–06	60	28	23	4	5	65	166	158	4th of 5, West; 6th of 11, USHL	Lost Div. Semifinals, 2–3 vs. Sioux Falls Stampede
2006–07	60	36	18	2	4	78	203	171	2nd of 6, West; 4th of 12, USHL	Won opening round, 4–3 vs. Sioux City Musketeers; Eliminated in round-robin (L, 0–3 vs. Des Moines; OTL, 3–4 vs. Sioux Falls)
2007–08	60	24	34	0	2	50	153	213	5th of 6, West; 10th of 12, USHL	did not qualify
2008–09	60	11	48	0	1	23	140	295	6th of 6, West; 12th of 12, USHL	did not qualify
2009–10	60	29	25	3	3	64	172	189	4th of 7, West; 7th of 14, USHL	Lost Div. Semifinals, 0–3 vs. Omaha Lancers
2010–11	60	19	30	5	6	49	137	206	8th of 8, West; 15th of 16, USHL	did not qualify
2011–12	60	26	33	1	0	53	164	200	6th of 8, West; 13th of 16, USHL	Lost Conf. Quarterfinals, 0–2 vs. Waterloo Black Hawks
2012–13	64	22	35	3	4	51	189	245	8th of 8, West; 14th of 16, USHL	did not qualify
2013–14	60	21	35	0	4	46	153	217	7th of 8, West; 14th of 16, USHL	did not qualify
2014–15	60	37	17	2	4	80	202	158	2nd of 8, West; 3rd of 17, USHL	Won Conf. Semifinals, 3–0 vs. Omaha Lancers; Lost Conf. Finals, 1–3 vs. Sioux Falls Stampede
2015–16	60	28	15	10	7	73	183	164	1st of 8, West; 5th of 17, USHL	Won Conf. Semifinals, 3–0 vs. Sioux Falls Stampede; Won Conf. Finals, 3–2 vs. Waterloo Black Hawks; Won Clark Cup Finals, 3–0 vs. Dubuque Fighting Saints
2016–17	60	21	31	6	2	50	153	180	8th of 8, West; 15th of 17, USHL	did not qualify
2017–18	60	29	27	2	2	62	137	155	6th of 8, West; 12th of 17, USHL	Lost First Round, 0–2 vs. Fargo Force
2018–19	62	45	12	3	2	95	232	144	1st of 8, West; 1st of 17, USHL	Won Conf. Semifinals, 3–0 vs. Des Moines Buccaneers; Lost Conf. Finals, 0–3 vs. Sioux Falls Stampede
2019–20	48	24	17	5	2	55	150	147	4th of 8, West; 6th of 16, USHL	Season cancelled
2020–21	52	30	18	3	1	64	178	137	1st of 8, West; 4th of 14, USHL	Lost Conf. Semifinals, 1–2 vs. Fargo Force
