= Penn State Nittany Lions men's ice hockey statistical leaders =

The Penn State Nittany Lions men's ice hockey statistical leaders are individual statistical leaders of the Penn State Nittany Lions men's ice hockey program in various categories, including goals, assists, points, and saves. Within those areas, the lists identify single-game, single-season, and career leaders. The Nittany Lions represent Pennsylvania State University in the NCAA's Big Ten Conference.

Penn State ice hockey was inaugurated in 1938, aside from two games in 1909–10. Penn State fielded a varsity hockey team for five seasons in the 1940s (1940–44, 1946–47) before the sport was dropped due to limited facilities. Penn State again began competing in intercollegiate ice hockey in 2012. These lists are updated through the end of the 2021–22 season.

== Goals ==
Career
Rk	Player	Goals	Seasons
1	Nate Sucese	61	2016–17 2017–18 2018–19 2019–20
2	Andrew Sturtz	54	2015–16 2016–17 2017–18
3	Alex Limoges	51	2017–18 2018–19 2019–20 2020–21
	Chase Berger	51	2015–16 2016–17 2017–18 2018–19
5	Denis Smirnov	50	2016–17 2017–18 2018–19 2019–20
6	Liam Folkes	48	2016–17 2017–18 2018–19 2019–20
	Aiden Fink	48	2023–24 2024–25 2025–26
8	Casey Bailey	45	2012–13 2013–14 2014–15
9	David Goodwin	44	2013–14 2014–15 2015–16 2016–17
10	Kevin Wall	43	2019–20 2020–21 2021–22 2022–23

Season
Rk	Player	Goals	Season
1	Alex Limoges	23	2018–19
	Aiden Fink	23	2024–25
3	Casey Bailey	22	2014–15
	Andrew Sturtz	22	2016–17
5	Denis Smirnov	19	2016–17
	Nate Sucese	19	2018–19
7	Andrew Sturtz	18	2015–16
	Liam Folkes	18	2018–19
	Matthew DiMarsico	18	2025–26
10	Nate Sucese	17	2016–17
	Kevin Wall	17	2022–23
	Matthew DiMarsico	17	2024–25

Single Game
Rk	Player	Goals	Season	Opponent
1	JJ Wiebusch	4	2025–26	Michigan
2	David Glen	3	2012–13	Alabama Huntsville
	Casey Bailey	3	2014–15	Ohio State
	Tommy Olczyk	3	2015–16	Princeton
	Denis Smirnov	3	2016–17	Arizona State
	James Robinson	3	2017–18	Mercyhurst
	Nate Sucese	3	2017–18	Wisconsin
	Evan Barratt	3	2018–19	Michigan
	Cole Hults	3	2019–20	Sacred Heart
	Liam Folkes	3	2019–20	Merrimack
	Kevin Wall	3	2021–22	Niagara
	Aiden Fink	3	2023–24	Michigan
	Jacques Bouquot	3	2023–24	Lindenwood
	Ryan Kirwan	3	2023–24	Army
	Aiden Fink	3	2024–25	Canisius
	JJ Wiebusch	3	2024–25	Michigan
	Matt DiMarsico	3	2025–26	Arizona State
	Matt DiMarsico	3	2025–26	Long Island
	Jarod Crespo	3	2025–26	RIT
	Matt DiMarsico	3	2025–26	Notre Dame
	Gavin McKenna	3	2025–26	Wisconsin
	Dane Dowiak	3	2025–26	Wisconsin

== Assists ==
Career
Rk	Player	Assists	Seasons
1	David Goodwin	84	2013–14 2014–15 2015–16 2016–17
2	Nate Sucese	79	2016–17 2017–18 2018–19 2019–20
3	Aiden Fink	77	2023–24 2024–25 2025–26
4	Brandon Biro	75	2016–17 2017–18 2018–19 2019–20
5	Alex Limoges	74	2017–18 2018–19 2019–20 2020–21
6	Chase Berger	67	2015–16 2016–17 2017–18 2018–19
7	Denis Smirnov	65	2016–17 2017–18 2018–19 2019–20
8	Cole Hults	61	2017–18 2018–19 2019–20
	Jimmy Dowd	61	2020–21 2021–22 2022–23 2023–24 2024–25
10	Daniyal Dzhaniyev	59	2021–22 2022–23 2023–24 2024–25

Season
Rk	Player	Assists	Season
1	Gavin McKenna	36	2025–26
2	Aiden Fink	30	2024–25
3	Denis Smirnov	28	2016–17
	Aiden Fink	28	2025–26
5	Nate Sucese	27	2019–20
	David Goodwin	27	2015–16
	David Goodwin	27	2016–17
	Alex Limoges	27	2018–19
	Evan Barratt	27	2018–19
	Simon Mack	27	2024–25
	Charlie Cerrato	27	2024–25

Single Game
Rk	Player	Assists	Season	Opponent
1	Gavin McKenna	7	2025–26	Ohio State
2	Andrew Sturtz	4	2017–18	Mercyhurst
	Alex Limoges	4	2018–19	Wisconsin
	Connor McMenamin	4	2020–21	Wisconsin
	Matt DiMarsico	4	2023–24	Michigan
	Aiden Fink	4	2024–25	Michigan
	Aiden Fink	4	2025–26	Notre Dame
	Aiden Fink	4	2025–26	Ohio State

== Points ==
Career
Rk	Player	Points	Seasons
1	Nate Sucese	140	2016–17 2017–18 2018–19 2019–20
2	David Goodwin	128	2013–14 2014–15 2015–16 2016–17
3	Alex Limoges	125	2017–18 2018–19 2019–20 2020–21
	Aiden Fink	125	2023–24 2024–25 2025–26
5	Chase Berger	118	2015–16 2016–17 2017–18 2018–19
6	Brandon Biro	116	2016–17 2017–18 2018–19 2019–20
7	Denis Smirnov	115	2016–17 2017–18 2018–19 2019–20
8	Andrew Sturtz	104	2015–16 2016–17 2017–18
9	Liam Folkes	103	2016–17 2017–18 2018–19 2019–20
10	Matthew DiMarsico	100	2023–24 2024–25 2025–26

Season
Rk	Player	Points	Season
1	Aiden Fink	53	2024–25
2	Gavin McKenna	51	2025–26
3	Alex Limoges	50	2018–19
4	Denis Smirnov	47	2016–17
5	Evan Barratt	43	2018–19
6	Liam Folkes	42	2018–19
	Charlie Cerrato	42	2024–25
	Matthew DiMarsico	42	2025–26
9	Andrew Sturtz	40	2017–18
	Casey Bailey	40	2014–15
	Brandon Biro	40	2018–19

Single Game
Rk	Player	Points	Season	Opponent
1	Gavin McKenna	8	2025–26	Ohio State
2	Andrew Sturtz	5	2017–18	Mercyhurst
	Connor McMenamin	5	2020–21	Wisconsin
	Charlie Cerrato	5	2025–26	Arizona State
	Aiden Fink	5	2025–26	Ohio State

== Saves ==
Career
Rk	Player	Saves	Seasons
1	Peyton Jones	3,685	2016–17 2017–18 2018–19 2019–20
2	Matthew Skoff	2,114	2012–13 2013–14 2014–15 2015–16
3	Liam Souliere	2,067	2020–21 2021–22 2022–23 2023–24
4	Eamon McAdam	1,256	2013–14 2014–15 2015–16
5	Oskar Autio	1,230	2018–19 2019–20 2020–21 2021–22
6	Arseni Sergeev	948	2024–25
7	PJ Musico	695	2012–13 2013–14 2014–15
8	Joshua Fleming	617	2025–26
9	Kevin Reidler	526	2025–26
10	Chris Funkey	366	2015–16 2016–17 2017–18 2018–19

Season
Rk	Player	Saves	Season
1	Peyton Jones	983	2017–18
2	Arseni Sergeev	948	2024–25
3	Peyton Jones	942	2018–19
4	Liam Souliere	918	2022–23
5	Peyton Jones	884	2016–17
6	Peyton Jones	876	2019–20
7	Matthew Skoff	656	2013–14
8	Liam Souliere	637	2023–24
9	Eamon McAdam	631	2015–16
10	Joshua Fleming	617	2025–26

Single Game
Rk	Player	Saves	Season	Opponent
1	Liam Souliere	55	2022–23	Ohio State
2	Matthew Skoff	52	2013–14	Michigan
