= 2016–17 Penn State Nittany Lions men's ice hockey season =

Big Ten tournament, Champion NCAA Tournament, Regional finals
- Conference: 4th Big Ten
- Home ice: Pegula Ice Arena

Rankings
- USCHO: 8
- USA Today: 8

Record
- Overall: 25–12–2
- Conference: 10–9–1–0
- Home: 11–5–3
- Road: 6–9–2
- Neutral: 1–1–0

Coaches and captains
- Head coach: Guy Gadowsky
- Assistant coaches: Keith Fisher; Matt Lindsay
- Captain: David Goodwin
- Alternate captain(s): Ricky DeRosa; James Robinson; David Thompson

The 2016–17 Penn State Nittany Lions men's ice hockey season was the 11th season of play for the program and the 4th season in the Big Ten Conference. The Nittany Lions represented Pennsylvania State University and were coached by Guy Gadowsky, in his 6th season.

== Departures ==
| Player | Position | Nationality | Cause |
|---|---|---|---|
| Kenny Brooks | Forward | United States | Graduation (Signed with Atlanta Gladiators) |
| David Glen | Forward/Defenseman | Canada | Graduation (Signed with Idaho Steelheads) |
| Luke Juha | Defenseman | Canada | Graduation (Signed with Missouri Mavericks) |
| Curtis Loik | Forward | Canada | Graduation (Signed with Black Wings Linz) |
| Eamon McAdam | Goaltender | United States | Signed professional contract (New York Islanders) |
| Tommy Olczyk | Forward | United States | Graduation (Signed with Alaska Aces) |
| Eric Scheid | Forward | United States | Graduation (Signed with Portland Pirates) |
| Matt Skoff | Goaltender | United States | Graduation (Signed with Reading Royals) |
| Connor Varley | Defenseman | United States | Graduation (Signed with Manchester Storm) |
| Mike Williamson | Defenseman | United States | Left program (retired) |

== Recruiting ==
| Player | Position | Nationality | Age | Notes |
|---|---|---|---|---|
| Brandon Biro | Forward | Canada | 18 | Sherwood Park, AB |
| Matt Erlichman | Goaltender | United States | 23 | Bedford, PA; transferred from club team |
| Liam Folkes | Forward | Canada | 20 | Scarborough, ON |
| Blake Gober | Forward | United States | 21 | Colleyville, TX |
| James Gobetz | Defenseman | United States | 20 | St. James, NY |
| Trevor Hamilton | Defenseman | United States | 21 | Grosse Pointe Farms, MI |
| Peyton Jones | Goaltender | United States | 20 | Langhorne, PA |
| Sean Kohler | Forward | Canada | 19 | Oakville, ON |
| Brett Murray | Forward | Canada | 18 | Bolton, ON; selected 99th overall in 2016 |
| Kris Myllari | Defenseman | Canada | 19 | Kanata, ON |
| Nikita Pavlychev | Forward | Russia | 19 | Yaroslavl, RUS; selected 197th overall in 2015 |
| Denis Smirnov | Forward | Russia | 19 | Moskva, RUS |
| Nate Sucese | Forward | United States | 20 | Fairport, NY |

== Roster ==
As of September 3, 2017.

| No. | Nat. | Player | Class | Pos | Height | Weight | DoB | Hometown | Previous team | NHL rights |
|---|---|---|---|---|---|---|---|---|---|---|
| 4 | (Canada) | Kris Myllari | Freshman | D | 6' 2" (1.88 m) | 200 lb (91 kg) | 1997-02-05 | Kanata, Ontario | Youngstown Phantoms (USHL) | — |
| 5 | (United States) | Kevin Kerr | Sophomore | D | 6' 0" (1.83 m) | 183 lb (83 kg) | 1996-02-09 | Bensalem, Pennsylvania | Tri-City Storm (USHL) | — |
| 6 | (United States) | James Gobetz | Freshman | D | 6' 2" (1.88 m) | 210 lb (95 kg) | 1996-08-06 | St. James, New York | Des Moines Buccaneers (USHL) | — |
| 7 | (Canada) | James Robinson (A) | Junior | F | 6' 2" (1.88 m) | 194 lb (88 kg) | 1994-04-09 | Cochrane, Alberta | Langley Rivermen (BCHL) | — |
| 8 | (United States) | Chase Berger | Sophomore | F | 6' 0" (1.83 m) | 194 lb (88 kg) | 1994-11-14 | St. Louis, Missouri | Tri-City Storm (USHL) | — |
| 9 | (United States) | David Goodwin (C) | Senior | F | 5' 10" (1.78 m) | 190 lb (86 kg) | 1992-02-27 | St. Louis, Missouri | Cedar Rapids RoughRiders (USHL) | — |
| 10 | (Canada) | Brandon Biro | Freshman | F | 5' 11" (1.8 m) | 175 lb (79 kg) | 1998-03-11 | Sherwood Park, Alberta | Spruce Grove Saints (AJHL) | — |
| 11 | (United States) | Trevor Hamilton | Freshman | D | 6' 0" (1.83 m) | 183 lb (83 kg) | 1995-03-17 | Grosse Pointe Farms, Michigan | Lincoln Stars (USHL) | — |
| 12 | (Canada) | Dylan Richard | Senior | F | 6' 1" (1.85 m) | 194 lb (88 kg) | 1993-02-05 | Edmonton, Alberta | Spruce Grove Saints (AJHL) | — |
| 13 | (Russia) | Nikita Pavlychev | Freshman | F | 6' 7" (2.01 m) | 225 lb (102 kg) | 1997-03-23 | Yaroslavl, Russia | Des Moines Buccaneers (USHL) | PIT, 197th overall 2015 |
| 14 | (United States) | Nate Sucese | Freshman | F | 5' 9" (1.75 m) | 175 lb (79 kg) | 1996-07-12 | Fairport, New York | Dubuque Fighting Saints (USHL) | — |
| 15 | (Canada) | Sean Kohler | Freshman | F | 5' 9" (1.75 m) | 174 lb (79 kg) | 1997-06-27 | Oakville, Ontario | St. Michael's Buzzers (OJHL) | — |
| 16 | (United States) | Andrew Sturtz | Sophomore | F | 5' 8" (1.73 m) | 185 lb (84 kg) | 1994-09-21 | Buffalo, New York | Carleton Place Canadians (CCHL) | — |
| 17 | (United States) | Zach Saar | Senior | F | 6' 4" (1.93 m) | 236 lb (107 kg) | 1993-06-22 | Richland, Michigan | Muskegon Lumberjacks (USHL) | — |
| 18 | (Canada) | Brett Murray | Freshman | F | 6' 4" (1.93 m) | 216 lb (98 kg) | 1998-07-20 | Bolton, Ontario | Youngstown Phantoms (USHL) | BUF, 99th overall 2016 |
| 19 | (Canada) | Derian Hamilton | Sophomore | D | 6' 1" (1.85 m) | 174 lb (79 kg) | 1994-07-06 | Port McNeill, British Columbia | Powell River Kings (BCHL) | — |
| 20 | (Finland) | Erik Autio | Junior | D | 5' 10" (1.78 m) | 183 lb (83 kg) | 1995-07-23 | Espoo, Finland | Espoo Blues U20 (Nuorten SM-liiga) | — |
| 21 | (United States) | Ricky DeRosa (A) | Senior | F | 6' 1" (1.85 m) | 190 lb (86 kg) | 1992-02-09 | Aston, Pennsylvania | Port Huron Fighting Falcons (NAHL) | — |
| 22 | (United States) | David Thompson (A) | Senior | D | 6' 2" (1.88 m) | 216 lb (98 kg) | 1992-05-19 | Glen Mills, Pennsylvania | Chilliwack Chiefs (BCHL) | — |
| 23 | (United States) | Blake Gober | Freshman | F | 5' 8" (1.73 m) | 179 lb (81 kg) | 1995-01-18 | Colleyville, Texas | Bloomington Thunder (USHL) | — |
| 24 | (United States) | Vince Pedrie | Senior | D | 6' 0" (1.83 m) | 194 lb (88 kg) | 1994-01-17 | Chicago, Illinois | Tri-City Storm (USHL) | — |
| 25 | (Russia) | Denis Smirnov | Freshman | F | 5' 10" (1.78 m) | 180 lb (82 kg) | 1997-08-12 | Moscow, Russia | Fargo Force (USHL) | — |
| 26 | (Canada) | Liam Folkes | Freshman | F | 5' 8" (1.73 m) | 182 lb (83 kg) | 1996-02-26 | Scarborough, Ontario | Brockville Braves (CCHL) | — |
| 27 | (United States) | Matt Mendelson | Sophomore | F | 5' 10" (1.78 m) | 170 lb (77 kg) | 1995-05-14 | Upper St. Clair, Pennsylvania | Bloomington Thunder (USHL) | — |
| 28 | (United States) | Alec Marsh | Sophomore | F | 5' 11" (1.8 m) | 187 lb (85 kg) | 1995-11-28 | Bridgewater, New Jersey | Fargo Force (USHL) | — |
| 30 | (United States) | Matt Erlichman | Junior | G | 5' 11" (1.8 m) | 181 lb (82 kg) | 1993-06-24 | Bedford, Pennsylvania | Three Rivers Vengeance (NA3HL) | — |
| 31 | (United States) | Peyton Jones | Freshman | G | 6' 4" (1.93 m) | 210 lb (95 kg) | 1996-02-14 | Langhorne, Pennsylvania | Lincoln Stars (USHL) | — |
| 33 | (United States) | Chris Funkey | Junior | G | 5' 10" (1.78 m) | 174 lb (79 kg) | 1994-03-16 | Orland Park, Illinois | New Jersey Hitmen (USPHL) | — |

== Standings ==
2016–17 Big Ten ice hockey standings
| | Conference record | | | | | | | | Overall record | | | | | |
| | GP | W | L | T | SOW | PTS | GF | GA | GP | W | L | T | GF | GA |
|---|---|---|---|---|---|---|---|---|---|---|---|---|---|---|
| #7 Minnesota † | 20 | 14 | 5 | 1 | 0 | 43 | 79 | 58 | 38 | 23 | 12 | 3 | 141 | 104 |
| #17 Wisconsin | 20 | 12 | 8 | 0 | 0 | 36 | 72 | 66 | 36 | 20 | 15 | 1 | 122 | 118 |
| #14 Ohio State | 20 | 11 | 8 | 1 | 1 | 35 | 76 | 62 | 39 | 21 | 12 | 6 | 154 | 113 |
| #8 Penn State * | 20 | 10 | 9 | 1 | 0 | 31 | 71 | 63 | 39 | 25 | 12 | 2 | 160 | 108 |
| Michigan | 20 | 6 | 12 | 2 | 2 | 22 | 53 | 75 | 35 | 13 | 19 | 3 | 92 | 111 |
| Michigan State | 20 | 3 | 14 | 3 | 0 | 13 | 47 | 74 | 35 | 7 | 24 | 4 | 84 | 134 |
Championship: March 18, 2017 † indicates conference regular season champion; * indicates conference tournament champion Rankings: USCHO.com Top 20 Poll; updated March 6, 2017

== Schedule and results ==
| Date | Time | Opponent^{#} | Rank^{#} | Site | TV | Decision | Result | Attendance | Record |
Exhibition
| October 2 | 1:00 pm | Queen's* | | Pegula Ice Arena • University Park, Pennsylvania (Exhibition) | | Jones | W 8–0 | 2,687 | |
Regular season
| October 6 | 7:07 pm | #16 St. Lawrence* | | Pegula Ice Arena • University Park, Pennsylvania | | Jones | W 4–2 | 5,850 | 1–0–0 |
| October 7 | 7:00 pm | #16 St. Lawrence* | | Pegula Ice Arena • University Park, Pennsylvania | | Funkey | L 3–6 | 5,987 | 1–1–0 |
| October 14 | 7:06 pm | vs. Mercyhurst* | | Erie Insurance Arena • Erie, Pennsylvania | | Jones | W 7–0 | 1,892 | 2–1–0 |
| October 21 | 7:35 pm | at #3 Notre Dame* | | Compton Family Ice Arena • Notre Dame, Indiana | | Jones | T 3–3 ^{OT} | 3,411 | 2–1–1 |
| October 22 | 7:10 pm | at #3 Notre Dame* | | Compton Family Ice Arena • Notre Dame, Indiana | | Jones | W 3–2 ^{OT} | 3,518 | 3–1–1 |
| October 28 | 7:07 pm | Canisius* | #19 | Pegula Ice Arena • University Park, Pennsylvania | | Jones | W 4–1 | 5,946 | 4–1–1 |
| October 29 | 7:07 pm | Canisius* | #19 | Pegula Ice Arena • University Park, Pennsylvania | | Jones | W 4–2 | 6,089 | 5–1–1 |
| November 3 | 7:07 pm | Niagara* | #14 | Pegula Ice Arena • University Park, Pennsylvania | | Funkey | W 5–1 | 5,839 | 6–1–1 |
| November 4 | 7:07 pm | Niagara* | #14 | Pegula Ice Arena • University Park, Pennsylvania | | Jones | W 5–1 | 6,061 | 7–1–1 |
| November 11 | 7:07 pm | Alaska Anchorage* | #12 | Pegula Ice Arena • University Park, Pennsylvania | | Jones | W 6–3 | 5,999 | 8–1–1 |
| November 12 | 7:07 pm | Alaska Anchorage* | #12 | Pegula Ice Arena • University Park, Pennsylvania | | Jones | W 3–1 | 6,069 | 9–1–1 |
| November 18 | 7:07 pm | Arizona State* | #10 | Pegula Ice Arena • University Park, Pennsylvania | | Jones | W 7–4 | 5,801 | 10–1–1 |
| November 19 | 3:07 pm | Arizona State* | #10 | Pegula Ice Arena • University Park, Pennsylvania | | Funkey | W 8–0 | 5,799 | 11–1–1 |
| December 1 | 6:33 pm | #20 Michigan | #7 | Pegula Ice Arena • University Park, Pennsylvania | | Jones | W 6–1 | 5,986 | 12–1–1 (1–0–0) |
| December 2 | 7:07 pm | #20 Michigan | #7 | Pegula Ice Arena • University Park, Pennsylvania | | Jones | W 5–1 | 6,077 | 13–1–1 (2–0–0) |
| January 6 | 7:05 pm | at #10 Ohio State | #2 | Value City Arena • Columbus, Ohio | | Jones | L 0–3 | 4,225 | 13–2–1 (2–1–0) |
| January 7 | 8:05 pm | at #10 Ohio State | #2 | Value City Arena • Columbus, Ohio | | Jones | W 4–2 | 4,755 | 14–2–1 (3–1–0) |
| January 13 | 7:07 pm | at Michigan State | #4 | Pegula Ice Arena • University Park, Pennsylvania | | Jones | W 5–2 | 6,152 | 15–2–1 (4–1–0) |
| January 14 | 7:03 pm | Michigan State | #4 | Pegula Ice Arena • University Park, Pennsylvania | | Jones | W 5–3 | 6,164 | 16–2–1 (5–1–0) |
| January 20 | 7:07 pm | #11 Ohio State | #1 | Pegula Ice Arena • University Park, Pennsylvania | | Jones | T 3–3 ^{SOL} | 6,154 | 16–2–2 (5–1–1) |
| January 21 | 7:07 pm | #11 Ohio State | #1 | Pegula Ice Arena • University Park, Pennsylvania | | Jones | L 3–6 | 6,167 | 16–3–2 (5–2–1) |
| January 28 | 7:00 pm | vs. Princeton* | #4 | Wells Fargo Center • Philadelphia, Pennsylvania | | Jones | L 4–5 | 15,127 | 16–4–2 |
| February 3 | 8:05 pm | at #7 Minnesota | #6 | 3M Arena at Mariucci • Minneapolis, Minnesota | | Funkey | L 1–5 | 9,575 | 16–5–2 (5–3–1) |
| February 4 | 8:03 pm | at #7 Minnesota | #6 | 3M Arena at Mariucci • Minneapolis, Minnesota | | Jones | L 2–5 | 9,963 | 16–6–2 (5–4–1) |
| February 10 | 8:07 pm | at #17 Wisconsin | #10 | Kohl Center • Madison, Wisconsin | | Jones | W 6–3 | 9,314 | 17–6–2 (6–4–1) |
| February 11 | 8:07 pm | at #17 Wisconsin | #10 | Kohl Center • Madison, Wisconsin | | Jones | W 5–2 | 12,669 | 18–6–2 (7–4–1) |
| February 17 | 6:33 pm | #5 Minnesota | #9 | Pegula Ice Arena • University Park, Pennsylvania | | Jones | L 3–6 | 6,137 | 18–7–2 (7–5–1) |
| February 18 | 8:03 pm | #5 Minnesota | #9 | Pegula Ice Arena • University Park, Pennsylvania | | Jones | L 3–4 ^{OT} | 6,140 | 18–8–2 (7–6–1) |
| February 24 | 7:03 pm | at Michigan State | #11 | Munn Ice Arena • East Lansing, Michigan | | Jones | W 4–2 | 4,501 | 19–8–2 (8–6–1) |
| February 25 | 7:05 pm | at Michigan State | #11 | Munn Ice Arena • East Lansing, Michigan | | Jones | W 4–1 | 5,420 | 20–8–2 (9–6–1) |
| March 3 | 7:07 pm | #16 Wisconsin | #11 | Pegula Ice Arena • University Park, Pennsylvania | | Jones | L 4–7 | 6,043 | 20–9–2 (9–7–1) |
| March 4 | 8:07 pm | #16 Wisconsin | #11 | Pegula Ice Arena • University Park, Pennsylvania | | Jones | W 6–0 | 6,053 | 21–9–2 (10–7–1) |
| March 10 | 7:30 pm | at Michigan | #11 | Yost Ice Arena • Ann Arbor, Michigan | | Jones | L 2–3 | 5,396 | 21–10–2 (10–8–1) |
| March 11 | 7:30 pm | at Michigan | #11 | Yost Ice Arena • Ann Arbor, Michigan | | Jones | L 0–4 | 5,800 | 21–11–2 (10–9–1) |
Big Ten Tournament
| March 16 | 8:02 PM | vs. Michigan* | #15 | Joe Louis Arena • Detroit, Michigan (Big Ten Quarterfinal) | | Jones | W 4–1 | 3,387 | 22–11–2 |
| March 17 | 8:02 PM | vs. #5 Minnesota* | #15 | Joe Louis Arena • Detroit, Michigan (Big Ten Semifinal) | | Jones | W 4–3 ^{2OT} | 2,791 | 23–11–2 |
| March 18 | 8:02 PM | vs. #18 Wisconsin* | #15 | Joe Louis Arena • Detroit, Michigan (Big Ten Championship) | | Jones | W 2–1 ^{2OT} | 5,601 | 24–11–2 |
NCAA Tournament
| March 25 | 4:30 PM | vs. #7 Union* | #11 | US Bank Arena • Cincinnati, Ohio (NCAA Midwest Regional Semifinal) | | Jones | W 10–3 | 3,917 | 25–11–2 |
| March 26 | 6:00 PM | vs. #1 Denver* | #11 | US Bank Arena • Cincinnati, Ohio (NCAA Midwest Regional Final) | | Jones | L 3–6 | 3,364 | 25–12–2 |
*Non-conference game. ^{#}Rankings from USCHO.com Poll. All times are in Eastern Time. Source:

== Scoring Statistics ==
| Name | Position | Games | Goals | Assists | Points | PIM |
|---|---|---|---|---|---|---|
| Denis Smirnov | LW/RW | 39 | 19 | 28 | 47 | 18 |
| David Goodwin | C/LW | 39 | 11 | 27 | 38 | 14 |
| Andrew Sturtz | RW | 37 | 22 | 15 | 37 | 18 |
| Nate Sucese | LW | 38 | 17 | 19 | 36 | 12 |
| Chase Berger | C | 39 | 13 | 23 | 36 | 18 |
| Vince Pedrie | D | 39 | 8 | 22 | 30 | 24 |
| Trevor Hamilton | D | 39 | 6 | 20 | 26 | 25 |
| Dylan Richard | C/LW | 35 | 10 | 13 | 23 | 8 |
| Brandon Biro | C/LW | 39 | 6 | 14 | 20 | 19 |
| Kris Myllari | D | 38 | 8 | 9 | 17 | 4 |
| Erik Autio | D | 39 | 3 | 14 | 17 | 16 |
| Kevin Kerr | D | 25 | 2 | 13 | 15 | 8 |
| Liam Folkes | C | 27 | 6 | 7 | 13 | 4 |
| Nikita Pavlychev | C/LW | 36 | 6 | 7 | 13 | 46 |
| Ricky DeRosa | F | 38 | 4 | 9 | 13 | 12 |
| Alec Marsh | C/LW | 26 | 6 | 4 | 10 | 16 |
| Zach Saar | RW | 18 | 4 | 4 | 8 | 44 |
| David Thompson | D | 18 | 4 | 4 | 8 | 6 |
| Blake Gober | F | 16 | 1 | 5 | 6 | 10 |
| James Robinson | F | 26 | 3 | 1 | 4 | 25 |
| Derian Hamilton | D | 15 | 0 | 3 | 3 | 2 |
| Peyton Jones | G | 36 | 0 | 2 | 2 | 2 |
| James Gobetz | D | 21 | 1 | 0 | 1 | 8 |
| Sean Kohler | LW | 2 | 0 | 1 | 1 | 2 |
| Brett Murray | LW/RW | 12 | 0 | 1 | 1 | 4 |
| Matt Mendelson | F | 1 | 0 | 0 | 0 | 0 |
| Chris Funkey | G | 4 | 0 | 0 | 0 | 0 |
| Bench | - | - | - | - | - | 12 |
| Total | | | 160 | 265 | 425 | 377 |

== Goaltending statistics ==
| Name | Games | Minutes | Wins | Losses | Ties | Goals against | Saves | Shut outs | SV % | GAA |
|---|---|---|---|---|---|---|---|---|---|---|
| Chris Funkey | 4 | 234:21 | 2 | 2 | 0 | 7 | 82 | 1 | .921 | 1.79 |
| Peyton Jones | 36 | 2171:01 | 23 | 10 | 2 | 94 | 884 | 2 | .904 | 2.60 |
| Empty Net | - | 9:41 | - | - | - | 7 | - | - | - | - |
| Total | 39 | 2415:03 | 25 | 12 | 2 | 108 | 966 | 3 | .899 | 2.68 |

== Rankings ==
| Poll | Week | | | | | | | | | | | | | | | | | | | | | | | | | |
| Poll | Pre | 1 | 2 | 3 | 4 | 5 | 6 | 7 | 8 | 9 | 10 | 11 | 12 | 13 | 14 | 15 | 16 | 17 | 18 | 19 | 20 | 21 | 22 | 23 | 24 | 25 (Final) |
|---|---|---|---|---|---|---|---|---|---|---|---|---|---|---|---|---|---|---|---|---|---|---|---|---|---|---|
| USCHO.com | NR | NR | NR | 19 | 14 | 12 | 10 | 8 | 7 | 3 | 3 | 3 | 2 | 4 | 1 | 4 | 6 | 10 | 9 | 11 | 11 | 11 | 15 | 11 | – | 8 |
| USA Today | NR | NR | NR | NR | 15 | 12 | 11 | 10 | 6 | 4 | 3 | 3 | 2 | 4 | 2 | 4 | 4 | 9 | 8 | 11 | 10 | 11 | 14 | 11 | 8 | 8 |

*USCHO did not release a poll in week 24.

== 2017 NHL entry draft ==
| Round | Pick | Player | NHL team |
|---|---|---|---|
| 3 | 90 | Evan Barratt ^{†} | Chicago Blackhawks |
| 5 | 134 | Cole Hults ^{†} | Los Angeles Kings |
| 6 | 156 | Denis Smirnov | Colorado Avalanche |
| 6 | 160 | Aarne Talvitie ^{†} | New Jersey Devils |

† incoming freshman
