= 2017–18 Penn State Nittany Lions men's ice hockey season =

Men's ice hockey season

NCAA Tournament, Regional semifinals
- Conference: 4th Big Ten
- Home ice: Pegula Ice Arena

Rankings
- USCHO: 13
- USA Today: 13

Record
- Overall: 18–15–5
- Conference: 9–10–5–2
- Home: 11–5–3
- Road: 6–9–2
- Neutral: 1–1–0

Coaches and captains
- Head coach: Guy Gadowsky
- Assistant coaches: Keith Fisher; Matt Lindsay
- Captain: James Robinson
- Alternate captain(s): Erik Autio; Chase Berger

The 2017–18 Penn State Nittany Lions men's ice hockey season was the 12th season of play for the program and the 5th season in the Big Ten Conference. The Nittany Lions represented Pennsylvania State University and were coached by Guy Gadowsky, in his 7th season.

== Season ==
Fresh off of their first tournament appearance, Penn State entered the season looking to improve on their newfound success. Unfortunately, the team had some difficulty finding traction early in the season. The Nittany Lions split each of their first five weekends of the season, progressively declining in the rankings, until they were knocked out altogether by Notre Dame. Peyton Jones, who had played spectacularly as a freshman, was struggling early in his sophomore season and began losing his first grip on the starting role.

In mid-November Penn State began to find their form and began a nearly 2-month unbeaten streak. They jumped back into the top-20 after a 4–0 shoutout against Ohio State that saw Jones seize his primary job in the crease and by mid-January the team had nearly returned to their preseason ranking. Immediately following their run, however, the offense flagged and the team went 8 games without a win. Because that stretch was played almost entirely against ranked teams, PSU wasn't punished too harshly in the standings (ending up at 16), but their hopes at returning to the tournament were balanced on a razor's edge. The team was tied for 5th in the conference entering the final weekend and they were facing a top-10 team in Minnesota. Surprisingly, the Nittany Lions easily handled the Gophers and leapt ahead of Minnesota in the standings, ending up as the 4th seed by just 1 point.

When the conference tournament began, PSU was again facing Minnesota. The team took advantage of their home games and swept the Golden Gophers with a nail-biter in the second match. The four consecutive wins essentially flipped Minnesota and Penn State in the rankings. When the team headed to South Bend the following week they were ranked 12th in the country and all but guaranteed a spot in the tournament regardless of the result. The team performed well against the Fighting Irish but fell 2–3.

Penn State was ranked 12th by the NCAA selection committee and given a #3 seed in the tournament. They opened against Denver as the de facto home team since they were the host for the Midwest Regional. Unfortunately, the team was overwhelmed by the Pioneers; Denver scored the first four goals and outshout the Nittany Lions 42–27 en route to a 5–1 win.

== Departures ==
Player	Position	Nationality	Cause
Ricky DeRosa	Forward	United States	Graduation (Retired)
David Goodwin	Forward	United States	Graduation (Signed with SaiPa)
Sean Kohler	Forward	Canada	Left Program (Retired)
Vince Pedrie	Defenseman	United States	Signed Professional Contract (New York Rangers)
Dylan Richard	Forward	Canada	Graduation (Signed with Manglerud Star Ishockey)
Zach Saar	Forward	United States	Graduation (Signed with Utah Grizzlies)
David Thompson	Defenseman	United States	Graduation (Retired)

== Recruiting ==
Player	Position	Nationality	Age	Notes
Evan Barratt	Forward	United States	18	Bristol, PA; selected 90th overall in 2017
Cole Hults	Defenseman	United States	19	Stoughton, WI; selected 134th overall in 2017
Alex Limoges	Forward	United States	20	Winchester, VA
Adam Pilewicz	Defenseman	United States	21	Sewickley, PA
Sam Sternschein	Forward	United States	19	Syosset, NY
Alex Stevens	Defenseman	United States	20	Plymouth, MI

== Roster ==
As of September 3, 2017.

No.	Nat.	Player	Class	Pos	Height	Weight	DoB	Hometown	Previous team	NHL rights
2	(United States)	Cole Hults	Freshman	D	6' 2" (1.88 m)	195 lb (88 kg)	1998-05-22	Stoughton, Wisconsin	Madison Capitols (USHL)	LAK, 134th overall 2017
4	(Canada)	Kris Myllari	Sophomore	D	6' 2" (1.88 m)	200 lb (91 kg)	1997-02-05	Kanata, Ontario	Youngstown Phantoms (USHL)	—
5	(United States)	Kevin Kerr	Junior	D	6' 0" (1.83 m)	183 lb (83 kg)	1996-02-09	Bensalem, Pennsylvania	Tri-City Storm (USHL)	—
6	(United States)	James Gobetz	Sophomore	D	6' 2" (1.88 m)	210 lb (95 kg)	1996-08-06	St. James, New York	Des Moines Buccaneers (USHL)	—
7	(Canada)	James Robinson (C)	Senior	F	6' 2" (1.88 m)	194 lb (88 kg)	1994-04-09	Cochrane, Alberta	Langley Rivermen (BCHL)	—
8	(United States)	Chase Berger (A)	Junior	F	6' 0" (1.83 m)	194 lb (88 kg)	1994-11-14	St. Louis, Missouri	Tri-City Storm (USHL)	—
9	(United States)	Alex Limoges	Freshman	F	6' 1" (1.85 m)	200 lb (91 kg)	1997-09-16	Winchester, Virginia	Waterloo Black Hawks (USHL)	—
10	(Canada)	Brandon Biro	Sophomore	F	5' 11" (1.8 m)	175 lb (79 kg)	1998-03-11	Sherwood Park, Alberta	Spruce Grove Saints (AJHL)	—
11	(United States)	Trevor Hamilton	Sophomore	D	6' 0" (1.83 m)	183 lb (83 kg)	1995-03-17	Grosse Pointe Farms, Michigan	Lincoln Stars (USHL)	—
13	(Russia)	Nikita Pavlychev	Sophomore	F	6' 7" (2.01 m)	225 lb (102 kg)	1997-03-23	Yaroslavl, Russia	Des Moines Buccaneers (USHL)	PIT, 197th overall 2015
14	(United States)	Nate Sucese	Sophomore	F	5' 9" (1.75 m)	175 lb (79 kg)	1996-07-12	Fairport, New York	Dubuque Fighting Saints (USHL)	—
16	(United States)	Andrew Sturtz	Junior	F	5' 8" (1.73 m)	185 lb (84 kg)	1994-09-21	Buffalo, New York	Carleton Place Canadians (CCHL)	—
17	(United States)	Evan Barratt	Freshman	F	5' 11" (1.8 m)	190 lb (86 kg)	1999-02-18	Bristol, Pennsylvania	USNTDP (USHL)	CHI, 90th overall 2017
18	(Canada)	Brett Murray	Sophomore	F	6' 4" (1.93 m)	216 lb (98 kg)	1998-07-20	Bolton, Ontario	Youngstown Phantoms (USHL)	BUF, 99th overall 2016
19	(Canada)	Derian Hamilton	Junior	D	6' 1" (1.85 m)	174 lb (79 kg)	1994-07-06	Port McNeill, British Columbia	Powell River Kings (BCHL)	—
20	(Finland)	Erik Autio (A)	Senior	D	5' 10" (1.78 m)	183 lb (83 kg)	1995-07-23	Espoo, Finland	Espoo Blues U20 (Nuorten SM-liiga)	—
22	(United States)	Alex Stevens	Freshman	D	6' 1" (1.85 m)	200 lb (91 kg)	1997-02-27	Plymouth, Minnesota	Dubuque Fighting Saints (USHL)	—
23	(United States)	Blake Gober	Sophomore	F	5' 8" (1.73 m)	179 lb (81 kg)	1995-01-18	Colleyville, Texas	Bloomington Thunder (USHL)	—
24	(United States)	Adam Pilewicz	Freshman	D	6' 1" (1.85 m)	180 lb (82 kg)	1996-07-20	Sewickley, Pennsylvania	Johnstown Tomahawks (NAHL)	—
25	(Russia)	Denis Smirnov	Sophomore	F	5' 10" (1.78 m)	180 lb (82 kg)	1997-08-12	Moscow, Russia	Fargo Force (USHL)	COL, 156th overall 2017
26	(Canada)	Liam Folkes	Sophomore	F	5' 8" (1.73 m)	182 lb (83 kg)	1996-02-26	Scarborough, Ontario	Brockville Braves (CCHL)	—
27	(United States)	Sam Sternschein	Freshman	F	6' 2" (1.88 m)	204 lb (93 kg)	1998-04-27	Syosset, New York	Lincoln Stars (USHL)	—
28	(United States)	Alec Marsh	Junior	F	5' 11" (1.8 m)	187 lb (85 kg)	1995-11-28	Bridgewater, New Jersey	Fargo Force (USHL)	—
30	(United States)	Matt Erlichman	Senior	G	5' 11" (1.8 m)	181 lb (82 kg)	1993-06-24	Bedford, Pennsylvania	Three Rivers Vengeance (NA3HL)	—
31	(United States)	Peyton Jones	Sophomore	G	6' 4" (1.93 m)	210 lb (95 kg)	1996-02-14	Langhorne, Pennsylvania	Lincoln Stars (USHL)	—
33	(United States)	Chris Funkey	Senior	G	5' 10" (1.78 m)	174 lb (79 kg)	1994-03-16	Orland Park, Illinois	New Jersey Hitmen (USPHL)	—

== Standings ==
2017–18 Big Ten ice hockey standings
	Conference record								Overall record					
	GP	W	L	T	SOW	PTS	GF	GA	GP	W	L	T	GF	GA
#2 Notre Dame†*	24	17	6	1	1	53	66	47	40	28	10	2	117	87
#3 Ohio State	24	14	8	2	1	45	77	55	41	26	10	5	131	85
#4 Michigan	24	11	10	3	2	38	70	72	40	22	15	3	136	121
#13 Penn State	24	9	10	5	2	34	70	72	38	18	15	5	138	120
#18 Minnesota	24	10	12	2	1	33	65	69	38	19	17	2	102	100
Wisconsin	24	8	13	3	1	28	69	83	37	14	19	4	115	124
Michigan State	24	6	16	2	1	21	53	77	36	12	22	2	91	117
Championship: March 17, 2018 † indicates conference regular season champion * indicates conference tournament champion Rankings: USCHO.com Top 20 Poll; updated March 12, 2018

== Schedule and results ==
Date	Time	Opponent^{#}	Rank^{#}	Site	TV	Decision	Result	Attendance	Record
Exhibition
October 1	3:07 PM	vs. Ottawa*	#10	Pegula Ice Arena • University Park, Pennsylvania (Exhibition)		Funkey	L 3–4 ^{OT}	4,482	
Regular season
October 6	7:00 PM	at Clarkson*	#10	Cheel Arena • Potsdam, New York		Jones	L 1–2	2,317	0–1–0
October 7	7:07 PM	at St. Lawrence*	#10	Appleton Arena • Canton, New York		Jones	W 4–1	2,758	1–1–0
October 13	8:05 PM	at #7 Minnesota	#11	3M Arena at Mariucci • Minneapolis, Minnesota	FSN	Jones	W 3–1	8,840	2–1–0 (1–0–0–0)
October 15	4:05 PM	at #7 Minnesota	#11	3M Arena at Mariucci • Minneapolis, Minnesota	FSN	Jones	L 3–6	8,114	2–2–0 (1–1–0–0)
October 19	7:03 PM	vs. American International*	#11	Pegula Ice Arena • University Park, Pennsylvania	BTN	Jones	W 7–5	6,018	3–2–0
October 20	7:07 PM	vs. American International*	#11	Pegula Ice Arena • University Park, Pennsylvania		Funkey	L 2–3 ^{OT}	6,149	3–3–0
October 27	7:07 PM	vs. Michigan	#15	Pegula Ice Arena • University Park, Pennsylvania		Jones	W 5–4 ^{OT}	6,096	4–3–0 (2–1–0–0)
October 28	8:07 PM	vs. Michigan	#15	Pegula Ice Arena • University Park, Pennsylvania		Jones	L 2–5	6,011	4–4–0 (2–2–0–0)
November 3	7:07 PM	vs. Mercyhurst*	#17	Pegula Ice Arena • University Park, Pennsylvania		Funkey	L 4–7	5,982	4–5–0
November 4	7:07 PM	vs. Mercyhurst*	#17	Pegula Ice Arena • University Park, Pennsylvania		Jones	W 7–5	6,089	5–5–0
November 10	7:35 PM	at #6 Notre Dame	#19	Compton Family Ice Arena • Notre Dame, Indiana		Jones	L 3–5	4,574	5–6–0 (2–3–0–0)
November 11	5:40 PM	at #6 Notre Dame	#19	Compton Family Ice Arena • Notre Dame, Indiana	NBCSN	Jones	L 0–1	4,160	5–7–0 (2–4–0–0)
November 17	10:05 PM	at Arizona State*		Gila River Arena • Glendale, Arizona		Funkey	W 7–0	2,842	6–7–0
November 18	9:05 PM	at Arizona State*		Gila River Arena • Glendale, Arizona		Jones	W 4–2	3,104	7–7–0
November 24	7:07 PM	vs. Michigan State		Pegula Ice Arena • University Park, Pennsylvania		Jones	W 7–2	5,931	8–7–0 (3–4–0–0)
November 25	8:07 PM	vs. Michigan State		Pegula Ice Arena • University Park, Pennsylvania		Jones	T 2–2 ^{SOL}	5,824	8–7–1 (3–4–1–0)
December 1	7:05 PM	at #11 Ohio State		Value City Arena • Columbus, Ohio		Funkey	T 5–5 ^{SOW}	4,281	8–7–2 (3–4–2–1)
December 2	4:05 PM	at #11 Ohio State		Value City Arena • Columbus, Ohio		Jones	W 4–0	3,861	9–7–2 (4–4–2–1)
December 8	7:05 PM	vs. Robert Morris*	#18	PPG Paints • Pittsburgh, Pennsylvania		Jones	W 5–2	2,471	10–7–2
December 9	7:07 PM	vs. Robert Morris*	#18	Pegula Ice Arena • University Park, Pennsylvania		Jones	W 7–4	6,089	11–7–2
January 5	7:07 PM	vs. #15 Wisconsin	#14	Pegula Ice Arena • University Park, Pennsylvania		Jones	W 5–1	5,822	12–7–2 (5–4–2–1)
January 6	7:03 PM	vs. #15 Wisconsin	#14	Pegula Ice Arena • University Park, Pennsylvania	BTN	Jones	T 3–3 ^{SOW}	5,963	12–7–3 (5–4–3–2)
January 12	7:37 PM	vs. #6 Ohio State	#13	Pegula Ice Arena • University Park, Pennsylvania		Jones	W 5–2	6,077	13–7–3 (6–4–3–2)
January 13	7:03 PM	vs. #6 Ohio State	#13	Pegula Ice Arena • University Park, Pennsylvania	BTN	Jones	L 1–5	6,182	13–8–3 (6–5–3–2)
January 19	8:03 PM	at #20 Michigan	#12	Yost Ice Arena • Ann Arbor, Michigan	BTN	Jones	L 0–4	5,574	13–9–3 (6–6–3–2)
January 20	7:31 PM	at #20 Michigan	#12	Yost Ice Arena • Ann Arbor, Michigan		Jones	L 2–3	5,800	13–10–3 (6–7–3–2)
January 26	9:03 PM	at #18 Wisconsin	#14	Kohl Center • Madison, Wisconsin	BTN	Jones	L 2–4	9,190	13–11–3 (6–8–3–2)
January 27	8:07 PM	at #18 Wisconsin	#14	Kohl Center • Madison, Wisconsin	FSW	Jones	T 4–4 ^{SOL}	13,689	13–11–4 (6–8–4–2)
February 2	6:33 PM	vs. #2 Notre Dame	#17	Pegula Ice Arena • University Park, Pennsylvania	BTN	Jones	L 3–5	6,229	13–12–4 (6–9–4–2)
February 3	4:07 PM	vs. #2 Notre Dame	#17	Pegula Ice Arena • University Park, Pennsylvania		Jones	T 2–2 ^{SOL}	6,221	13–12–5 (6–9–5–2)
February 16	6:33 PM	at Michigan State	#16	Munn Ice Arena • East Lansing, Michigan	BTN	Jones	L 2–4	5,649	13–13–5 (6–10–5–2)
February 17	5:03 PM	at Michigan State	#16	Munn Ice Arena • East Lansing, Michigan	BTN	Jones	W 3–2	6,368	14–13–5 (7–10–5–2)
February 23	6:33 PM	vs. #8 Minnesota	#18	Pegula Ice Arena • University Park, Pennsylvania	BTN	Jones	W 5–1	6,171	15–13–5 (8–10–5–2)
February 24	7:03 PM	vs. #8 Minnesota	#18	Pegula Ice Arena • University Park, Pennsylvania	BTN	Jones	W 5–2	6,172	16–13–5 (9–10–5–2)
Big Ten Tournament
March 2	7:03 PM	vs. #11 Minnesota*	#15	Pegula Ice Arena • University Park, Pennsylvania (Big Ten Quarterfinal Game 1)		Jones	W 5–3	4,170	17–13–5
March 3	7:03 PM	vs. #11 Minnesota*	#15	Pegula Ice Arena • University Park, Pennsylvania (Big Ten Quarterfinal Game 2)		Jones	W 6–5	5,025	18–13–5
Penn State wins series 2–0
March 10	5:33 PM	at #5 Notre Dame*	#12	Compton Family Ice Arena • Notre Dame, Indiana (Big Ten Semifinal)	ESPNU	Jones	L 2–3	4,892	18–14–5
NCAA Tournament
March 24	7:07 PM	vs. #3 Denver*	#12	PPL Center • Allentown, Pennsylvania (NCAA Midwest Regional semifinal)	ESPN3	Jones	L 1–5	7,491	18–15–5
*Non-conference game. ^{#}Rankings from USCHO.com Poll. All times are in Eastern Time.

== Scoring Statistics ==
Name	Position	Games	Goals	Assists	Points	PIM
Andrew Sturtz	RW	37	14	26	40	62
Brandon Biro	LW	37	9	22	31	18
Nate Sucese	LW	36	14	15	29	26
Trevor Hamilton	D	38	6	23	29	35
Denis Smirnov	LW/RW	30	15	12	27	6
Chase Berger	C	38	11	16	27	4
Liam Folkes	C	38	13	10	23	0
Alex Limoges	C	37	7	14	21	16
Cole Hults	D	38	3	17	20	43
Evan Barratt	C/LW	32	11	7	18	34
Nikita Pavlychev	C	35	9	5	14	36
Kris Myllari	D	38	5	9	14	4
Erik Autio	D	30	2	12	14	10
James Robinson	F	37	6	5	11	53
Sam Sternschein	LW	25	5	5	10	6
Kevin Kerr	D	20	1	9	10	4
Alec Marsh	C/LW	35	2	7	9	24
James Gobetz	D	35	1	8	9	18
Brett Murray	LW	21	1	5	6	23
Derian Hamilton	D	22	1	3	4	6
Peyton Jones	G	35	0	4	4	0
Blake Gober	F	16	2	1	3	2
Chris Funkey	G	6	0	1	1	0
Matt Erlichman	G	2	0	0	0	0
Adam Pilewicz	D	2	0	0	0	0
Alex Stevens	D	7	0	0	0	2
Bench	-	-	-	-	-	2
Total			138	236	374	424

== Goaltending statistics ==
Name	Games	Minutes	Wins	Losses	Ties	Goals against	Saves	Shut outs	SV %	GAA
Matt Erlichman	2	4:07	0	0	0	0	1	0	1.000	0.00
Chris Funkey	6	243	1	2	1	12	104	1	.897	2.96
Peyton Jones	35	2036	17	13	4	103	983	1	.905	3.03
Empty Net	-	26	-	-	-	5	-	-	-	-
Total	38	2309	18	15	5	120	1088	2	.901	3.12

== Rankings ==
Poll	Week																								
Poll	Pre	1	2	3	4	5	6	7	8	9	10	11	12	13	14	15	16	17	18	19	20	21	22	23	24 (Final)
USCHO.com	10	–	11	11	15	17	19	NR	NR	NR	18	15	14	13	12	14	17	16	16	18	15	12	13	12	13
USA Today	10	11	11	11	15	NR	NR	NR	NR	NR	NR	13	13	13	12	12	NR	NR	NR	NR	13	12	12	12	13

*USCHO did not release a poll in week 1.
