= 2018–19 Penn State Nittany Lions men's ice hockey season =

- Conference: 4th Big Ten
- Home ice: Pegula Ice Arena

Rankings
- USCHO: 17
- USA Today: NR

Record
- Overall: 22–15–2
- Conference: 11–12–1–1
- Home: 15–8–0
- Road: 6–7–1
- Neutral: 1–0–1

Coaches and captains
- Head coach: Guy Gadowsky
- Assistant coaches: Keith Fisher; Matt Lindsay; Andrew Magera
- Captain: Chase Berger
- Alternate captain(s): Kevin Kerr; Brandon Biro

The 2018–19 Penn State Nittany Lions men's ice hockey season was the 13th season of play for the program and the 6th season in the Big Ten Conference. The Nittany Lions represented Pennsylvania State University and were coached by Guy Gadowsky, in his 8th season.

== Season ==
Playing most of their non-conference schedule at home, Penn State rose up the rankings with a hot start to the season. The team cooled off when their conference schedule began and the Nittany Lions could not find any consistency for several months. Penn State ended up a game below .500 in the Big Ten standings and faced the prospect of having to win the Big Ten Tournament to receive an NCAA berth. After a rocky start the Nittany Lions overcame Wisconsin in the quarterfinal round, then pulled off an upset over top-ranked Ohio State to set PSU against Notre Dame. Both teams faced a win or go home scenario and played a close game throughout. The Fighting Irish gained three separate 1-goal leads and they were able to keep their final edge, holding Penn State off in the third period despite a barrage of shots from the Lions' nation-leading offense.

== Departures ==
Player	Position	Nationality	Cause
Erik Autio	Defenseman	Finland	Graduation (Signed with SaiPa)
Matthew Erlichman	Goaltender	United States	Graduation (Retired)
Trevor Hamilton	Defenseman	United States	Signed Professional Contract (Grand Rapids Griffins)
Matt Mendelson	Forward	United States	Left Program (Retired)
Brett Murray	Forward	Canada	Signed Professional Contract (Youngstown Phantoms)
James Robinson	Forward	United States	Graduation (Signed with Jokers de Cergy)
Andrew Sturtz	Defenseman	Finland	Signed Professional Contract (Ottawa Senators)

== Recruiting ==
Player	Position	Nationality	Age	Notes
Oskar Autio	Goaltender	Finland	18	Espoo, FIN
Paul DeNaples	Defenseman	United States	20	Moscow, PA
Ludvig Larsson	Forward/Defenseman	Sweden	22	Malmö, SWE; transfer from Merrimack
Max Sauvé	Forward	United States	20	Acushnet, MA
Aarne Talvitie	Forward	Finland	19	Espoo, FIN; selected 160th overall in 2017

== Roster ==
As of September 3, 2018.

No.	Nat.	Player	Class	Pos	Height	Weight	DoB	Hometown	Previous team	NHL rights
2	(United States)	Cole Hults	Sophomore	D	6' 2" (1.88 m)	195 lb (88 kg)	1998-05-22	Stoughton, Wisconsin	Madison Capitols (USHL)	LAK, 134th overall 2017
3	(United States)	Paul DeNaples	Freshman	D	6' 0" (1.83 m)	184 lb (83 kg)	1998-09-19	Moscow, Pennsylvania	Sioux Falls Stampede (USHL)	—
4	(Canada)	Kris Myllari	Junior	D	6' 2" (1.88 m)	200 lb (91 kg)	1997-02-05	Kanata, Ontario	Youngstown Phantoms (USHL)	—
5	(United States)	Kevin Kerr (A)	Senior	D	6' 0" (1.83 m)	183 lb (83 kg)	1996-02-09	Bensalem, Pennsylvania	Tri-City Storm (USHL)	—
6	(United States)	James Gobetz	Junior	D	6' 2" (1.88 m)	210 lb (95 kg)	1996-08-06	St. James, New York	Des Moines Buccaneers (USHL)	—
7	(United States)	Evan Bell	Sophomore	D	5' 11" (1.8 m)	191 lb (87 kg)	1997-06-25	Livonia, Michigan	Fargo Force (USHL)	—
8	(United States)	Chase Berger (C)	Senior	F	6' 0" (1.83 m)	194 lb (88 kg)	1994-11-14	St. Louis, Missouri	Tri-City Storm (USHL)	—
9	(United States)	Alex Limoges	Sophomore	F	6' 1" (1.85 m)	200 lb (91 kg)	1997-09-16	Winchester, Virginia	Waterloo Black Hawks (USHL)	—
10	(Canada)	Brandon Biro (A)	Junior	F	5' 11" (1.8 m)	175 lb (79 kg)	1998-03-11	Sherwood Park, Alberta	Spruce Grove Saints (AJHL)	—
11	(United States)	Max Sauvé	Freshman	F	5' 9" (1.75 m)	165 lb (75 kg)	1998-09-02	Acushnet, Massachusetts	Avon Old Farms (USHS–CT)	—
12	(Sweden)	Ludvig Larsson	Senior	F/D	6' 0" (1.83 m)	182 lb (83 kg)	1995-10-02	Malmö, Sweden	Merrimack (HEA)	—
13	(Russia)	Nikita Pavlychev	Junior	F	6' 7" (2.01 m)	225 lb (102 kg)	1997-03-23	Yaroslavl, Russia	Des Moines Buccaneers (USHL)	PIT, 197th overall 2015
14	(United States)	Nate Sucese	Junior	F	5' 9" (1.75 m)	175 lb (79 kg)	1996-07-12	Fairport, New York	Dubuque Fighting Saints (USHL)	—
17	(United States)	Evan Barratt	Sophomore	F	5' 11" (1.8 m)	190 lb (86 kg)	1999-02-18	Bristol, Pennsylvania	USNTDP (USHL)	CHI, 90th overall 2017
19	(Canada)	Derian Hamilton	Senior	D	6' 1" (1.85 m)	174 lb (79 kg)	1994-07-06	Port McNeill, British Columbia	Powell River Kings (BCHL)	—
20	(Finland)	Aarne Talvitie	Freshman	F	5' 10" (1.78 m)	198 lb (90 kg)	1999-02-11	Espoo, Finland	Espoo Blues U20 (Nuorten SM-liiga)	NJD, 160th overall 2017
22	(United States)	Alex Stevens	Sophomore	D	6' 1" (1.85 m)	200 lb (91 kg)	1997-02-27	Plymouth, Minnesota	Dubuque Fighting Saints (USHL)	—
23	(United States)	Blake Gober	Junior	F	5' 8" (1.73 m)	179 lb (81 kg)	1995-01-18	Colleyville, Texas	Bloomington Thunder (USHL)	—
24	(United States)	Adam Pilewicz	Sophomore	D	6' 1" (1.85 m)	180 lb (82 kg)	1996-07-20	Sewickley, Pennsylvania	Johnstown Tomahawks (NAHL)	—
25	(Russia)	Denis Smirnov	Junior	F	5' 10" (1.78 m)	180 lb (82 kg)	1997-08-12	Moscow, Russia	Fargo Force (USHL)	COL, 156th overall 2017
26	(Canada)	Liam Folkes (A)	Junior	F	5' 8" (1.73 m)	182 lb (83 kg)	1996-02-26	Scarborough, Ontario	Brockville Braves (CCHL)	—
27	(United States)	Sam Sternschein	Sophomore	F	6' 2" (1.88 m)	204 lb (93 kg)	1998-04-27	Syosset, New York	Lincoln Stars (USHL)	—
28	(United States)	Alec Marsh	Senior	F	5' 11" (1.8 m)	187 lb (85 kg)	1995-11-28	Bridgewater, New Jersey	Fargo Force (USHL)	—
31	(United States)	Peyton Jones	Junior	G	6' 4" (1.93 m)	210 lb (95 kg)	1996-02-14	Langhorne, Pennsylvania	Lincoln Stars (USHL)	—
33	(United States)	Chris Funkey	Senior	G	5' 10" (1.78 m)	174 lb (79 kg)	1994-03-16	Orland Park, Illinois	New Jersey Hitmen (USPHL)	—
35	(Finland)	Oskar Autio	Freshman	G	6' 0" (1.83 m)	183 lb (83 kg)	1999-10-06	Espoo, Finland	Chicago Steel (USHL)	—

== Standings ==
2018–19 Big Ten Hockey Standings
	Conference record								Overall record					
	GP	W	L	T	3/SW	PTS	GF	GA	GP	W	L	T	GF	GA
#12 Ohio State †	24	13	7	4	3	46	79	52	36	20	11	5	108	83
#10 Notre Dame *	24	11	11	2	2	37	63	65	40	23	14	3	112	91
#20 Minnesota	24	11	10	3	0	36	76	75	38	18	16	4	117	108
#17 Penn State	24	11	12	1	1	35	101	96	39	22	15	2	177	139
Wisconsin	24	9	10	5	2	34	69	81	37	14	18	5	113	130
Michigan	24	9	10	5	2	34	76	75	36	13	16	7	110	114
Michigan State	24	8	12	4	2	30	68	88	36	12	19	5	99	122
Championship: March 23, 2019 † indicates conference regular season champion * indicates conference tournament champion Rankings: USCHO.com Top 20 Poll

== Schedule and results ==
Date	Time	Opponent^{#}	Rank^{#}	Site	TV	Decision	Result	Attendance	Record
Exhibition
October 6	4:55 PM	vs. Brock*		Pegula Ice Arena • University Park, Pennsylvania (Exhibition)		Autio	W 3–2	1,804	
Regular season
October 11	7:07 PM	vs. #17 Clarkson*	#16	Pegula Ice Arena • University Park, Pennsylvania		Funkey	W 4–3	5,975	1–0–0
October 12	7:07 PM	vs. #17 Clarkson*	#16	Pegula Ice Arena • University Park, Pennsylvania		Jones	W 5–1	6,121	2–0–0
October 10	7:07 PM	vs. Niagara*	#10	Pegula Ice Arena • University Park, Pennsylvania		Funkey	W 8–2	6,063	3–0–0
October 20	3:37 PM	vs. Niagara*	#10	Pegula Ice Arena • University Park, Pennsylvania		Jones	W 4–1	6,145	4–0–0
October 26	7:07 PM	vs. #13 Princeton*	#10	Pegula Ice Arena • University Park, Pennsylvania		Jones	W 4–2	6,139	5–0–0
November 2	7:07 PM	vs. Arizona State*	#6	Pegula Ice Arena • University Park, Pennsylvania		Funkey	W 6–5	6,002	6–0–0
November 3	8:07 PM	vs. Arizona State*	#6	Pegula Ice Arena • University Park, Pennsylvania		Jones	L 3–4 ^{OT}	6,147	6–1–0
November 9	7:07 PM	vs. Robert Morris*	#8	Pegula Ice Arena • University Park, Pennsylvania		Funkey	W 7–2	6,180	7–1–0
November 10	7:05 PM	at Robert Morris*	#8	Colonials Arena • Neville Township, Pennsylvania		Jones	W 11–6	1,403	8–1–0
November 16	7:07 PM	vs. #16 Michigan	#5	Pegula Ice Arena • University Park, Pennsylvania		Funkey	L 4–6	5,873	8–2–0 (0–1–0–0)
November 17	7:07 PM	vs. #16 Michigan	#5	Pegula Ice Arena • University Park, Pennsylvania		Jones	W 7–6 ^{OT}	5,810	9–2–0 (1–1–0–0)
November 23	5:05 PM	at #5 Ohio State	#6	Value City Arena • Columbus, Ohio		Jones	W 4–3	6,034	10–2–0 (2–1–0–0)
November 24	8:05 PM	at #5 Ohio State	#6	Value City Arena • Columbus, Ohio		Jones	L 2–5	3,838	10–3–0 (2–2–0–0)
November 30	8:07 PM	at Wisconsin	#6	Kohl Center • Madison, Wisconsin	FSW	Jones	T 3–3 ^{SOW}	8,369	10–3–1 (2–2–1–1)
December 1	8:07 PM	at Wisconsin	#6	Kohl Center • Madison, Wisconsin	FSW	Jones	L 5–8	10,055	10–4–1 (2–3–1–1)
December 7	7:07 PM	vs. #5 Notre Dame	#9	Pegula Ice Arena • University Park, Pennsylvania		Autio	L 4–5	6,061	10–5–1 (2–4–1–1)
December 8	7:07 PM	vs. #5 Notre Dame	#9	Pegula Ice Arena • University Park, Pennsylvania		Jones	W 9–1	6,213	11–5–1 (3–4–1–1)
December 15	7:30 PM	vs. Princeton	#9	Wells Fargo Center • Philadelphia, Pennsylvania		Jones	T 4–4 ^{OT}	8,490	11–5–2
January 4	9:03 PM	at Minnesota	#9	3M Arena at Mariucci • Minneapolis, Minnesota	ESPN U	Jones	W 4–2	7,375	12–5–2 (4–4–1–1)
January 5	8:05 PM	at Minnesota	#9	3M Arena at Mariucci • Minneapolis, Minnesota		Jones	L 1–4	8,952	12–6–2 (4–5–1–1)
January 11	8:03 PM	vs. Michigan State	#11	Pegula Ice Arena • University Park, Pennsylvania		Jones	W 4–2	6,096	13–6–2 (5–5–1–1)
January 12	7:07 PM	vs. Michigan State	#11	Pegula Ice Arena • University Park, Pennsylvania		Jones	L 4–6	6,199	13–7–2 (5–6–1–1)
January 18	7:07 PM	vs. #4 Ohio State	#13	Pegula Ice Arena • University Park, Pennsylvania		Jones	L 1–4	6,131	13–8–2 (5–7–1–1)
January 19	3:07 PM	vs. #4 Ohio State	#13	Pegula Ice Arena • University Park, Pennsylvania		Jones	L 4–6	6,094	13–9–2 (5–8–1–1)
January 24	7:32 PM	at Michigan	#15	Munn Ice Arena • East Lansing, Michigan		Autio	L 1–5	5,647	13–10–2 (5–9–1–1)
January 26	7:03 PM	vs. Michigan	#15	Madison Square Garden • New York, New York	BTN	Jones	W 5–2	9,271	14–10–2 (6–9–1–1)
February 8	6:01 PM	vs. Minnesota	#18	Pegula Ice Arena • University Park, Pennsylvania		Jones	W 7–2	6,131	15–10–2 (7–9–1–1)
February 9	6:01 PM	vs. Minnesota	#18	Pegula Ice Arena • University Park, Pennsylvania		Jones	W 6–2	6,229	16–10–2 (8–9–1–1)
February 15	7:05 PM	at Michigan State	#17	Munn Ice Arena • East Lansing, Michigan		Jones	L 3–5	5,185	16–11–2 (8–10–1–1)
February 16	7:05 PM	at Michigan State	#17	Munn Ice Arena • East Lansing, Michigan		Jones	W 5–3	5,941	17–11–2 (9–10–1–1)
February 22	6:33 PM	vs. Wisconsin	#19	Pegula Ice Arena • University Park, Pennsylvania	BTN	Jones	W 8–2	6,110	18–11–2 (10–10–1–1)
February 23	7:07 PM	vs. Wisconsin	#19	Pegula Ice Arena • University Park, Pennsylvania		Jones	L 3–7	6,151	18–12–2 (10–11–1–1)
March 1	7:10 PM	vs. #17 Notre Dame	#18	Compton Family Ice Arena • Notre Dame, Indiana	NBCSN	Jones	L 4–5 ^{OT}	4,238	18–13–2 (10–12–1–1)
March 2	7:05 PM	vs. #17 Notre Dame	#18	Compton Family Ice Arena • Notre Dame, Indiana		Jones	W 3–2	4,950	19–13–2 (11–12–1–1)
Big Ten Tournament
March 8	8:07 PM	vs. Wisconsin*	#18	Pegula Ice Arena • University Park, Pennsylvania (Big Ten Quarterfinal Game 1)		Jones	L 3–4	3,381	19–14–2
March 9	6:07 PM	vs. Wisconsin*	#18	Pegula Ice Arena • University Park, Pennsylvania (Big Ten Quarterfinal Game 2)		Jones	W 6–2	4,886	20–14–2
March 10	6:07 PM	vs. Wisconsin*	#18	Pegula Ice Arena • University Park, Pennsylvania (Big Ten Quarterfinal Game 3)		Jones	W 4–3 ^{OT}	3,285	21–14–2
Penn State wins series 2–1
March 17	3:31 PM	at #6 Ohio State*	#17	Value City Arena • Columbus, Ohio (Big Ten Semifinal)	BTN	Jones	W 5–1	4,545	22–14–2
March 23	8:03 PM	at #16 Notre Dame*	#17	Compton Family Ice Arena • Notre Dame, Indiana (Big Ten Championship)	BTN	Jones	L 2–3	5,988	22–15–2
*Non-conference game. ^{#}Rankings from USCHO.com Poll. All times are in Eastern Time.

== Scoring Statistics ==
Name	Position	Games	Goals	Assists	Points	PIM
Alex Limoges	C	39	23	27	50	10
Evan Barratt	C/LW	32	16	27	43	55
Liam Folkes	C	39	18	24	42	8
Brandon Biro	LW	37	16	24	40	4
Nate Sucese	LW	39	19	18	37	24
Chase Berger	C	39	14	15	29	8
Nikita Pavlychev	C	39	14	15	29	57
Cole Hults	D	39	6	22	28	24
Ludvig Larsson	C/D	39	9	16	25	22
Denis Smirnov	RW/LW	37	8	14	22	6
Kris Myllari	D	39	4	17	21	12
Sam Sternschein	LW	39	9	9	18	10
Aarne Talvitie	C/LW	17	5	11	16	2
Kevin Kerr	D	35	2	13	15	19
Alec Marsh	C/LW	34	7	7	14	18
Paul DeNaples	D	39	2	12	14	6
Alex Stevens	D	35	1	10	11	43
Evan Bell	D	21	1	8	9	6
Adam Pilewicz	D	14	2	2	4	0
James Gobetz	D	23	0	3	3	8
Derian Hamilton	D	26	0	3	3	6
Blake Gober	F	30	0	3	3	31
Max Sauvé	F	9	1	1	2	0
Oskar Autio	G	3	0	0	0	0
Chris Funkey	G	7	0	0	0	0
Peyton Jones	G	32	0	0	0	0
Bench	-	-	-	-	-	10
Total			177	301	478	389

== Goaltending statistics ==
Name	Games	Minutes	Wins	Losses	Ties	Goals against	Saves	Shut outs	SV %	GAA
Peyton Jones	32	1878	18	12	2	104	942	0	.901	3.32
Oskar Autio	3	122	0	2	0	7	59	0	.894	3.42
Chris Funkey	7	340	4	1	0	20	152	0	.884	3.53
Empty Net	-	21	-	-	-	8	-	-	-	-
Total	39	2363	22	15	2	139	1153	0	.892	3.53

== Rankings ==
Poll	Week																							
Poll	Pre	1	2	3	4	5	6	7	8	9	10	11	12	13	14	15	16	17	18	19	20	21	22	23 (Final)
USCHO.com	16	16	10	10	6	8	5	6	6	9	9	11	13	15	15	18	17	19	18	18	17	17	16	17
USA Today	15	NR	11	9	6	8	5	6	6	9	9	10	9	10	12	NR	NR	NR	NR	NR	NR	NR	NR	NR

== 2019 NHL entry draft ==
Round	Pick	Player	NHL team
6	181	Kevin Wall^{†}	Carolina Hurricanes

† incoming freshman
