= 2024–25 Penn State Nittany Lions men's ice hockey season =

Sports season

NCAA Tournament, National Semifinal
- Conference: 5th Big Ten
- Home ice: Pegula Ice Arena

Rankings
- USCHO: #5
- USA Hockey: #5

Record
- Overall: 22–14–4
- Conference: 9–11–4
- Home: 10–4–2
- Road: 9–9–1
- Neutral: 3–1–1

Coaches and captains
- Head coach: Guy Gadowsky
- Assistant coaches: Keith Fisher; Juliano Pagliero; Andrew Sturtz
- Captain: Simon Mack
- Alternate captain(s): Jimmy Dowd; Carson Dyck

The 2024–25 Penn State Nittany Lions men's ice hockey season was the 19th season of play for the program and 12th in the Big Ten Conference. The Nittany Lions represented Penn State University in the 2024–25 NCAA Division I men's ice hockey season, played their home games at Pegula Ice Arena and were coached by Guy Gadowsky in his 13th season.

== Season ==
=== Unknown quantity ===
After a forgettable season in '24, Penn State entered this year without much fanfare. While the Nittany Lions did lose several pieces in the offseason, there was hope that the team's biggest weakness, goaltending, had been resolved. Arsenii Sergeev transferred in from Connecticut with the expectation of not only being the starting netminder, but the solution to PSU's problem in goal.

Early on, the returns were good. Sergeev looked like the quality netminder her was billed as throughout October. Penn State went 4–1 with their only loss being a 1-goal defeat at the hands of perennial power Quinnipiac. Once the team began its conference schedule, the Lions first ran into one of the championship favorites in Minnesota. Sergeev performed well in the series, allowing 3 goals on 45 shots. Unfortunately, Penn State's offense failed to provide him any support and the team lost both games. Sergeev's first blemish came the following week when he was lit up by Wisconsin in an overtime loss but that was hardly enough to cause him to lose his starting job.

=== Injury ===
In the rematch with the Badgers, Sergeev allowed two early goals and was removed just 4:14 into the match. He was later revealed to have suffered a lower body injury and would be out until the beginning of January. Noah Grannan assumed control of the crease but he proved ill-suited to the role. Grannan surrendered a further 4 goals to the Badgers in the club's fourth consecutive loss. After a week to prepare for being a starter, Grannan continued to stumble in goal, allowing 6 to Michigan in the first game. The rematch was even worse with the Wolverines collecting 7 goals before the backup was pulled in favor of John Seifarth, who only recently been promoted from the school's club team. Seifarth allowed the final three goals of the match but was finally able to arrest PSU's slide by winning both games the following weekend.

Seifarth retained control of the goal for the rest of the first half and proved to be a stabilizing force in goal. However, the offense once more failed to appear and the Lions were swept by Ohio State at the beginning of December. Though the team managed to go into the break with a win in the inaugural Capital Hockey Classic, the Nittany Lions' season was already on life support. Penn State lost all eight of their conference games in the first half and that left them wallowing at the bottom of the standings. The only saving grace for the team was that they had compiled a stellar non-conference record (7–1) which kept them hovering near the middle of the PairWise rankings. However, with the team facing down a heavy dose of Big Ten teams in the second half, Penn State was going nowhere unless they figured out how to overcome their conference rivals.

=== Sergeev returns ===
Penn State was back on the ice at the beginning of January at Wrigley Field as part of the Frozen Confines series. Fortunately for the Nittany Lions, Sergeev had recovered from his injury on time and he was ready to go for the second half of the year. From that point on, PSU's season was largely in the hands of the Russian netminder and he did everything he could to keep their faint postseason hopes alive. After backstopping the team to their first conference win on the 5th, Sergeev was able to resist one of the strongest team's in the country and earn a partial split against Michigan State.

Around this time, Penn State started seeing improvements on the offensive side as well. Aiden Fink had been a consistent contributor throughout the year, posting 23 points in the first half, but he was beginning to get additional aid in after the new year. Two freshmen, Charlie Cerrato and J. J. Wiebusch, had recorded respectable numbers over the first half of the year as the two grew accustomed to the college game (23 combined points). After getting a semester under their belts, the two exploded in the second half of the year and together added an additional 52 points to finish 2nd and 3rd in team scoring behind Fink. The increased scoring paired well with the stable goaltending the team was receiving and Penn State was soon one of the hottest teams in the nation.

=== Resurrection ===
The Nittany Lions completely turned their season around in the second half, piling up win after win against several ranked teams. Over the final seven weeks of the year, PSU went 10–2–2, which included a 6–2–2 record against ranked opponents. The stretch allowed Penn State to jump in the PairWise from the mid-30 up into the top-16 by the end of the regular season. When their schedule was complete, Penn State had a golden opportunity to earn an at-large bid but they still had some work to do. Due to their horrid start, the Lions finished 5th in the Big Ten standings and would have to start their postseason chase on the road. While being matched against Michigan was hardly advantageous, it did give the Lions their best chance to assure themselves of a postseason berth. At the time, Penn State was 14th in the rankings, putting them in the final open spot for the tournament, barring tournament upsets. Michigan was three placed ahead, meaning that not only would Penn State receive a sizable boost to their ranking if they won the series, but they could also leap frog the Wolverines with a win in the quarterfinals.

=== Big Ten Playoffs ===
With both teams knowing that their seasons could be on the line, the Lions got off to a quick start and scored three goals in the opening period. Knowing how potent Michigan's offense was, Penn State tried to outskate their opponents and limit the Wolverines opportunities. Unfortunately, even Penn State got into penalty trouble and Michigan was able to tie the match by the early part of the third. Wiebusch tried to be the hero by scoring two goals in the middle of the period but Michigan managed to tie the game in less than 7 minutes and forced the match into overtime. PSU got back onto the power play in the extra session and Wiebusch was able to finish off his hat-trick with Cerrato and Fink assisting on the winning goal.

After escaping with a win, Penn State looked far better in the rematch and they were able to overpower Michigan in the first two periods. The Nittany Lions double up the Wolverines in goals and had a sizable advantage in shots (31–19). The team pulled back in the third, playing a defensive game that forced Michigan into having to settle for low-percentage shots, all of which Sergeev was able to stop. The final goal of the match came from Cerrato on a penalty shot and the Lions skated away with a huge result for their playoff aspirations.

In the semifinals, Penn State faced Ohio State and got off to a sluggish start. After falling behind in the first, PSU was able to get into the lead thanks to Wiebusch and their power play in the second. However, the Buckeyes refused to knuckle-under and just past the midpoint of the third, OSU was back in front. Matt DiMarsico's 14th of the year knotted the score for the fourth time that night and the two continued to battle for the winning tally but overtime was ultimately required. Ohio State's defense was smothering in the extra session, holding Penn State to just a single shot in over 14 minutes of game time. With the team completely unable to get its offense going, there was little chance the Lions had to win the match and, sure enough, the Buckeyes were able to collect the winning goal on their 42nd shot of the match.

=== NCAA tournament ===
While the loss didn't help Penn State, the team's sweep of Michigan earned them the #12 spot in the final PairWise rankings. More, the Big Ten and Hockey East championship games both were full of teams ahead of Penn State in the rankings. This meant that the Penn State was assured a spot in the tournament regardless of the conference tournament results. After such an arduous stretch of games, Penn State was able to relax for a week and prepare themselves for a run at the national title.

With Penn State serving as the host for the Allentown Regional, they were automatically placed in that bracket and set against #3 overall-Maine. The team looked a little rusty at the start, allowing the Black Bears to open the scoring thanks to a crazy bounce. After that, Penn State took control of the match an remained in charge for the rest of the match. The Lions scored three goals before the end of the first, two on the power play, and prevented the Bears from getting anything going on offense. The Lions were able to sit back and wait for their chances thanks to their lead and scored twice more over the final two periods to win the game with relative ease.

Their second match saw the team pitted against Connecticut, giving Sergeev a chance to face off against his former club. Penn State shot out of the gate and fired a barrage on the UConn cage in the first but they were only able to get out of the period with a 1–1 draw. The Huskies got into the lead midway through the second but Wiebusch was quick to respond, tying the match just 30 seconds later. After that, the Huskies slowly began to take over the game and forced Sergeev to make save after save just to keep the Lions in the match. Fortunately for PSU, their goaltender was up to the task and no further goals were scored in regulation. Connecticut continued to dictate the pace of play in overtime and doubled the Lions' shot total. Sergeev was kept busy, stopping several quality scoring chances in the extra frame. Nearing the end of the period, the Cerrato was able to turn the puck over at the UConn blueline ad skate into the zone. He found DiMarsico in the high slot with a behind-the-back pass and the sophomore ripped a shot into the cage for the game-winner.

==== Frozen Four ====
The victory sent Penn State to the program's first Frozen Four and gave them a showdown with Boston University for the right to head to the championship game. The Terriers, however, had not only ben to the past two national semifinals but were a much more talented team, at least on paper. Penn State who had won so many of their recent games thanks to the speed and tenacity of their lineup, found themselves struggling with the even greater tempo used by BU. The Lions were only able to fire 15 shots on goal in the first two periods and entered the final period down 0–2. The Lions threw everything they had at Boston University in the third. Nicholas DeGraves cut the lead in half just over 2 minutes into the frame and proceeded to pump shot after shot towards the BU cage. The Terriers bent but never broke and, as time began to wind down, the Nittany Lions were forced to pull their goaltender for an extra attacker. DiMarsico nearly found the tying goal under the arm of the opposing netminder but it was not to be for the Nittany Lions. WIth about a minute to play, BU was able to collect an empty-net goal that put the match out of reach and the best season in the short history of the program was over.

== Departures ==
Player	Position	Nationality	Cause
Christian Berger	Defenseman	United States	Graduation (signed with Maine Mariners)
Jacques Bouquot	Forward	United States	Graduation (signed with Reading Royals)
Doug Dorr	Goaltender	United States	Graduation (retired)
Dylan Gratton	Defenseman	United States	Transferred to Omaha
Ryan Kirwan	Forward	United States	Transferred to Arizona State
Xander Lamppa	Forward	United States	Graduation (signed with Maine Mariners)
Chase McLane	Forward	United States	Graduate transfer to Colorado College
Tanner Palocsik	Defenseman	United States	Graduation (signed with Toledo Walleye)
Christian Sarlo	Forward	United States	Graduation (signed with Maine Mariners)
Liam Soulière	Goaltender	Canada	Graduate transfer to Minnesota

== Recruiting ==
Player	Position	Nationality	Age	Notes
Charlie Cerrato	Forward	United States	19	Fallston, MD
Cade Christenson	Defenseman	Canada	19	Edmonton, AB
Nicholas Degraves	Forward	Canada	21	Edmonton, AB
Nicholas Fascia	Defenseman	United States	19	Blackwood, NJ
Braedon Ford	Forward	United States	20	Pittsburgh, PA
Jason Gallucci	Defenseman	United States	20	Robbinsville, NJ
Andrew Kuzma	Forward	United States	19	New York, NY
Keaton Peters	Forward	United States	20	Sussex, WI
John Seifarth	Goaltender	United States	21	Pittsburgh, PA; joined from club team
Arsenii Sergeev	Goaltender	Russia	21	Yaroslavl, RUS; transfer from Connecticut
J. J. Wiebusch	Forward	United States	20	River Falls, WI

== Roster ==
As of September 5, 2024.

No.	Nat.	Player	Class	Pos	Height	Weight	DoB	Hometown	Previous team	NHL rights
2	(United States)	Carter Schade	Junior	D	5' 11" (1.8 m)	185 lb (84 kg)	2003-03-07	Mars, Pennsylvania	Lincoln Stars (USHL)	—
3	(United States)	Casey Aman	Sophomore	D	6' 0" (1.83 m)	185 lb (84 kg)	2003-01-15	Johnstown, Pennsylvania	Powell River Kings (BCHL)	—
4	(Canada)	Simon Mack (C)	Senior	D	5' 10" (1.78 m)	180 lb (82 kg)	2001-03-29	Brockville, Ontario	Des Moines Buccaneers (USHL)	—
6	(United States)	Jimmy Dowd Jr. (A)	Graduate	D	5' 9" (1.75 m)	161 lb (73 kg)	2000-07-09	Point Pleasant Beach, New Jersey	Chicago Steel (USHL)	—
7	(Canada)	Carson Dyck (A)	Senior	F	6' 0" (1.83 m)	180 lb (82 kg)	2001-06-07	Lethbridge, Alberta	Okotoks Oilers (AJHL)	—
8	(United States)	Alex Servagno	Junior	F	5' 9" (1.75 m)	170 lb (77 kg)	2002-06-16	Gibsonia, Pennsylvania	Green Bay Gamblers (USHL)	—
9	(United States)	Keaton Peters	Freshman	F	5' 10" (1.78 m)	187 lb (85 kg)	2004-05-01	Sussex, Wisconsin	Lincoln Stars (USHL)	—
10	(United States)	Nick Fascia	Freshman	D	6' 1" (1.85 m)	183 lb (83 kg)	2005-04-28	Blackwood, New Jersey	Waterloo Black Hawks (USHL)	—
11	(United States)	Andrew Kuzma	Freshman	F	6' 0" (1.83 m)	194 lb (88 kg)	2005-01-29	New York, New York	Madison Capitols (USHL)	—
12	(United States)	Ben Schoen	Senior	F	5' 8" (1.73 m)	150 lb (68 kg)	2002-05-18	Maumee, Ohio	Tri-City Storm (USHL)	—
13	(United States)	Danny Dzhaniyev	Senior	F	5' 5" (1.65 m)	150 lb (68 kg)	2002-09-15	Brooklyn, New York	Dubuque Fighting Saints (USHL)	—
14	(United States)	Matt DiMarsico	Sophomore	F	6' 0" (1.83 m)	180 lb (82 kg)	2004-01-07	Wexford, Pennsylvania	Green Bay Gamblers (USHL)	—
15	(United States)	Charlie Cerrato	Freshman	F	6' 0" (1.83 m)	190 lb (86 kg)	2005-03-10	Fallston, Maryland	Youngstown Phantoms (USHL)	—
16	(United States)	Dylan Lugris	Senior	F	6' 2" (1.88 m)	185 lb (84 kg)	2001-06-23	Buffalo, New York	New Jersey Hitmen (NCDC)	—
17	(Canada)	Nicholas DeGraves	Freshman	F	6' 0" (1.83 m)	172 lb (78 kg)	2003-05-19	Edmonton, Alberta	Brooks Bandits (BCHL)	—
18	(Canada)	Aiden Fink	Sophomore	F	5' 10" (1.78 m)	160 lb (73 kg)	2004-11-24	Calgary, Alberta	Brooks Bandits (AJHL)	NSH, 218th overall 2023
19	(United States)	Dane Dowiak	Sophomore	F	5' 10" (1.78 m)	180 lb (82 kg)	2002-03-27	Pittsburgh, Pennsylvania	Tri-City Storm (USHL)	—
20	(United States)	J. J. Wiebusch	Freshman	F	6' 0" (1.83 m)	172 lb (78 kg)	2004-02-20	River Falls, Wisconsin	Sioux Falls Stampede (USHL)	—
21	(United States)	Braedon Ford	Freshman	F	5' 9" (1.75 m)	168 lb (76 kg)	2004-01-19	Pittsburgh, Pennsylvania	Des Moines Buccaneers (USHL)	—
22	(United States)	Jason Gallucci	Freshman	D	5' 10" (1.78 m)	172 lb (78 kg)	2004-04-22	Robbinsville, New Jersey	Green Bay Gamblers (USHL)	—
23	(United States)	Tyler Paquette	Graduate	F	6' 3" (1.91 m)	200 lb (91 kg)	2001-03-18	Collegeville, Pennsylvania	Green Bay Gamblers (USHL)	—
24	(United States)	Jarod Crespo	Junior	D	6' 0" (1.83 m)	190 lb (86 kg)	2002-04-30	Seven Lakes, North Carolina	Green Bay Gamblers (USHL)	—
27	(Canada)	Cade Christenson	Freshman	D	6' 3" (1.91 m)	183 lb (83 kg)	2004-11-02	Edmonton, Alberta	Sherwood Park Crusaders (BCHL)	—
29	(United States)	Reese Laubach	Sophomore	F	6' 0" (1.83 m)	170 lb (77 kg)	2003-11-20	San Jose, California	Omaha Lancers (USHL)	SJS, 217th overall 2022
30	(United States)	John Seifarth	Junior	G	6' 3" (1.91 m)	195 lb (88 kg)	2003-11-13	Pittsburgh, Pennsylvania	Avonworth High School (USHS–PA)	—
33	(United States)	Noah Grannan	Junior	G	6' 2" (1.88 m)	190 lb (86 kg)	2002-04-27	Germantown, Wisconsin	Sioux Falls Stampede (USHL)	—
35	(Russia)	Arsenii Sergeev	Junior	G	6' 3" (1.91 m)	195 lb (88 kg)	2002-12-16	Yaroslavl, Russia	Connecticut (HEA)	CGY, 205th overall 2021

== Standings ==
2024–25 Big Ten ice hockey Standings
	Conference record										Overall record					
	GP	W	L	T	OTW	OTL	3/SW	PTS	GF	GA	GP	W	L	T	GF	GA
#6 Michigan State †*	24	15	5	4	2	1	2	50	92	60	37	26	7	4	129	77
#9 Minnesota †	24	15	6	3	1	3	0	50	87	62	40	25	11	4	154	101
#11 Ohio State	24	14	9	1	3	2	0	42	72	62	40	24	14	2	127	106
#17 Michigan	24	12	10	2	5	1	2	36	76	83	36	18	15	3	112	118
#5 Penn State	24	9	11	4	2	1	3	33	78	88	40	22	14	4	139	120
Wisconsin	24	7	16	1	1	6	0	27	64	77	37	13	21	3	108	110
Notre Dame	24	4	19	1	2	2	1	14	60	97	38	12	25	1	102	127
Championship: March 22, 2025 † indicates conference regular season champion * indicates conference tournament champion Rankings: USCHO.com Top 20 Poll

== Schedule and results ==
Date	Time	Opponent^{#}	Rank^{#}	Site	TV	Decision	Result	Attendance	Record
Regular Season
October 5	11:07 pm	at Alaska*		Carlson Center • Fairbanks, Alaska	FloHockey	Sergeev	W 4–3 ^{OT}	2,242	1–0–0
October 6	9:07 pm	at Alaska*		Carlson Center • Fairbanks, Alaska	FloHockey	Sergeev	W 5–0	1,925	2–0–0
October 12	7:00 pm	at #8 Quinnipiac*		M&T Bank Arena • Hamden, Connecticut	ESPN+	Sergeev	L 2–3	3,477	2–1–0
October 25	7:00 pm	St. Lawrence*		Pegula Ice Arena • University Park, Pennsylvania		Sergeev	W 3–2	6,292	3–1–0
October 26	4:00 pm	St. Lawrence*		Pegula Ice Arena • University Park, Pennsylvania		Sergeev	W 3–1	6,141	4–1–0
November 1	8:00 pm	at #4 Minnesota	#18	3M Arena at Mariucci • Minneapolis, Minnesota		Sergeev	L 1–3	8,351	4–2–0 (0–1–0)
November 2	8:00 pm	at #4 Minnesota	#18	3M Arena at Mariucci • Minneapolis, Minnesota		Sergeev	L 0–1	8,872	4–3–0 (0–2–0)
November 15	7:00 pm	Wisconsin	#18	Pegula Ice Arena • University Park, Pennsylvania		Sergeev	L 4–5 ^{OT}	6,315	4–4–0 (0–3–0)
November 16	7:00 pm	Wisconsin	#18	Pegula Ice Arena • University Park, Pennsylvania		Grannan	L 3–6	6,348	4–5–0 (0–4–0)
November 22	7:00 pm	#5т Michigan		Pegula Ice Arena • University Park, Pennsylvania		Grannan	L 5–6	5,592	4–6–0 (0–5–0)
November 23	7:30 pm	#5т Michigan		Pegula Ice Arena • University Park, Pennsylvania		Grannan	L 6–10	5,919	4–7–0 (0–6–0)
November 26	6:00 pm	Colgate*		Pegula Ice Arena • University Park, Pennsylvania		Seifarth	W 2–3	5,165	5–7–0
November 27	4:30 pm	Colgate*		Pegula Ice Arena • University Park, Pennsylvania		Seifarth	W 7–1	5,376	6–7–0
December 6	7:30 pm	at #17 Ohio State		Value City Arena • Columbus, Ohio	BTN	Seifarth	L 0–4	3,875	6–8–0 (0–7–0)
December 7	7:00 pm	at #17 Ohio State		Value City Arena • Columbus, Ohio		Seifarth	L 2–4	4,934	6–9–0 (0–8–0)
December 12	8:00 pm	vs. Army*		Capital One Arena • Washington, D. C. (Capital Hockey Classic)		Seifarth	W 4–1	3,000	7–9–0
January 3	8:30 pm	vs. Notre Dame		Wrigley Field • Chicago, Illinois (Frozen Confines)	BTN	Sergeev	T 3–3 ^{SOL}	25,709	7–9–1 (0–8–1)
January 5	5:00 pm	at Notre Dame		Compton Family Ice Arena • Notre Dame, Indiana	Peacock	Sergeev	W 3–0	5,027	8–9–1 (1–8–1)
January 10	7:00 pm	#1 Michigan State		Pegula Ice Arena • University Park, Pennsylvania		Sergeev	L 6–4	5,665	8–10–1 (1–9–1)
January 11	6:00 pm	#1 Michigan State		Pegula Ice Arena • University Park, Pennsylvania		Sergeev	T 2–2 ^{SOW}	6,020	8–10–2 (1–9–2)
January 17	7:00 pm	Canisius*		Pegula Ice Arena • University Park, Pennsylvania		Sergeev	W 4–0	6,310	9–10–2
January 18	5:00 pm	Canisius*		Pegula Ice Arena • University Park, Pennsylvania		Sergeev	W 3–2	6,573	10–10–2
January 24	7:00 pm	#9 Ohio State		Pegula Ice Arena • University Park, Pennsylvania		Sergeev	T 6–6 ^{SOW}	6,569	10–10–3 (1–9–3)
January 25	5:00 pm	#9 Ohio State		Pegula Ice Arena • University Park, Pennsylvania		Sergeev	W 3–2 ^{OT}	6,604	11–10–3 (2–9–3)
January 31	7:00 pm	at #13 Michigan		Yost Ice Arena • Ann Arbor, Michigan		Sergeev	W 5–4	5,800	12–10–3 (3–9–3)
February 1	6:00 pm	at #13 Michigan		Yost Ice Arena • Ann Arbor, Michigan		Sergeev	L 3–7	5,800	12–11–3 (3–10–3)
February 7	8:00 pm	at #19 Wisconsin		Kohl Center • Madison, Wisconsin		Sergeev	W 2–0	10,071	13–11–3 (4–10–3)
February 8	7:00 pm	at #19 Wisconsin		Kohl Center • Madison, Wisconsin		Sergeev	W 6–2	12,446	14–11–3 (5–10–3)
February 14	7:00 pm	Notre Dame	#18	Pegula Ice Arena • University Park, Pennsylvania		Sergeev	W 5–3	6,606	15–11–3 (6–10–3)
February 15	5:00 pm	Notre Dame	#18	Pegula Ice Arena • University Park, Pennsylvania		Sergeev	W 3–2	6,589	16–11–3 (7–10–3)
February 21	6:00 pm	at #1 Michigan State	#18	Munn Ice Arena • East Lansing, Michigan		Sergeev	T 2–2 ^{SOW}	6,555	16–11–4 (7–10–4)
February 22	6:00 pm	at #1 Michigan State	#18	Munn Ice Arena • East Lansing, Michigan		Sergeev	W 3–2	6,555	17–11–4 (8–10–4)
February 28	8:30 pm	#2 Minnesota	#15	Pegula Ice Arena • University Park, Pennsylvania	BTN	Sergeev	W 4–3 ^{OT}	6,577	18–11–4 (9–10–4)
March 1	8:00 pm	#2 Minnesota	#15	Pegula Ice Arena • University Park, Pennsylvania	BTN	Sergeev	L 3–5	6,570	18–12–4 (9–11–4)
Big Ten Tournament
March 7	7:00 pm	at #11 Michigan	#15	Yost Ice Arena • Ann Arbor, MI (Quarterfinals Game 1)	B1G+	Sergeev	W 6–5 ^{OT}	4,734	19–12–4
March 8	7:00 pm	at #11 Michigan	#15	Yost Ice Arena • Ann Arbor, Michigan (Quarterfinals Game 2)	B1G+	Sergeev	W 5–2	5,341	20–12–4
March 15	8:30 pm	at #10 Ohio State	#11	Nationwide Arena • Columbus, Ohio (Semifinals)	BTN	Sergeev	L 3–4 ^{OT}	2,900	20–13–4
NCAA Tournament
March 28	8:30 pm	vs. #4 Maine*	#12	PPL Center • Allentown, Pennsylvania (Regional Semifinal)	ESPN2	Sergeev	W 5–1	7,358	21–13–4
March 30	4:30 pm	vs. #7 Connecticut*	#12	PPL Center • Allentown, Pennsylvania (Regional Final)	ESPN2	Sergeev	W 3–2 ^{OT}	6,933	22–13–4
April 10	8:30 pm	vs. #8 Boston University*	#12	Enterprise Center • St. Louis, Missouri (National Semifinal)	ESPN2	Sergeev	L 1–3		22–14–4
*Non-conference game. ^{#}Rankings from USCHO.com Poll. All times are in Eastern Time. Source:

== NCAA tournament ==
=== Regional semifinal ===
March 28, 2025; 8:30 pm	(1) Maine	1–5 (1–3, 0–1, 0–1)	(4) Penn State	PPL Center; Attendance: 7,358

Game reference

Albin Boija
Goalies
Arsenii Sergeev
Referees:
C. J. Hanafin
Cameron Lynch
Linesmen:
Patrick Dapuzzo
John Rey

(unassisted) Bodie Nobes (1) – 04:10	1–0
	1–1	05:04 – PP – J. J. Wiebusch (13) (Cerrato, Fink)
	1–2	14:26 – Matt DiMarsico (15) (Wiebusch, Cerrato)
	1–3	18:08 – PP – Dane Dowiak (10) (Dzhaniyev, Mack)
	1–4	25:41 – Matt DiMarsico (16) (Cerrato)
	1–5	56:37 – EN – Dane Dowiak (11) (unassisted)

10 min
Penalties
4 min
27
Shots
34

Game summary
The final game of the First Round began fast with both teams looking to prove themselves early. After a few rushes by both sides, the puck came to into the Maine zone about 2 minutes in. While no scoring chance occurred, Reese Laubach took a high crosscheck and crashed to the ice next to the net. After he skated off with an apparent injury, the Bears pushed the puck up the ice and established themselves in the zone. They got the puck to the front of the net and while the puck was slapped away by Keaton Peters, it deflected up into the air, arced over the shoulder of Arsenii Sergeev and landed in the net. The goal had a lengthy official review and determined that the hit on Laubach was not worthy of a major penalty and allowed the goal to stand. When play resumed, Penn State got right into the offensive zone and Albin Boija was forced to stop a pair of chances in quick succession. Just before the 50-minute mark, the PSU attack drew the game's first penalty when Thomas Freel was handed a boarding minor. Less than 10 seconds later, a cross crease pass gave J. J. Wiebusch a clear shot at a goal and he quickly tied the game. The fast pace continued after the goal and the teams alternated chances and both forechecked hard. Near the middle of the frame, Maine once again went a little over the line and Charlie Russell was handed a boarding penalty. The Nittany Lions carried the play in the early part of the man-advantage but Maine was able to keep them from scoring. In the second half of the penalty, Maine was able to get a glorious shorthanded chance but Owen Fowler's shot was deflected wide. A few seconds later, Charlie Cerrato was handed a boarding penalty and ended the PSU power play 30 seconds early. The brief 4-on-4 play saw both teams try to gain the upper hand but the defenses held. Once the Maine power play began, the Bears quickly got set up in the offensive zone but they had trouble getting the puck through to the net. Sergeev only had to make one save late and the Lions killed off the remainder of the time. Shortly afterwards, Taylor Makar rushed the puck deep into the Black Bears' end but he took a spill and crashed into the boards. Luckily, he got right back to his feet and looked to have escaped injury. With about 6 minutes to play, the referees missed what appeared to be a high-sticking penalty by Maine. Instead of complaining, Penn State skated right down the ice and got the puck to a streaking Matt DiMarsico. The forward fought off a hook from the defense and then fired the puck high into the far corner. On the return to action, Dylan Lugris was handed a minor for slashing to give Maine its second man-advantage. Furious work from both sides saw the Bears fire several shots on goal but in their zeal to keep the pressure on, Freel committed a hooking penalty on an attempted clear and it was Maine's turn to lose it power play early. The Lions spent most of their man-advantage struggling to find room but, just as it was winding down, Penn State fired the uck towards the net and the puck deflected in off of Dane Dowiak skate. Maine challenged the play for offsides but the officials allowed the goal to stand. Once play resumed the speed increased, if anything. Both teams played hard until the horn sounded but it was Penn State that carried the balance of play.

The second period began with Maine skating fast and trying to break into the Penn State zone while the Nittany Lions countered with a more reserved attack. PSU was content to wait for their opportunities and they were rewarded with a breakaway just two minutes in but Boija was able to stop Aiden Fink with his glove. The Black Bears shook off the near-miss and continued to pressure Penn State but were unable to find the net. Just past the 5-minute mark, David Breazeale threw a blind pass behind his own net but the only one in the area was Charlie Cerrato. The Lion forward found DiMarsico in front of the net and the sophomore made no mistake, burying his second of the night into the top corner. With a 3-goal lead now, Penn State had little reason to go away from their defense-first game even with half of the match still to be played. Despite Maine pressing hard in the offensive zone, the Lions counterattack was getting the better chances and Boija had to work just to keep his team in the match. Maine was almost able to get one back with about 7 minutes to play when the puck bounced out of Sergeev's glove but it slid past the outside of the post. Physical play afterwards saw both teams throwing the body around and Dowiak was slow to get up. Shortly after, Cerrato crashed into Boija, hitting the goaltender high and nocking his head into the post. After an injury stoppage, the Swede was able to continue. Neither team shied away from contact as Manie tried to force their way into the Penn State end but the Nittany Lions would not oblige. PSU's patience continued to be rewarded with the best chances and Cerrato was inches away from finding a goal with 2 minutes to play but the angle on his shot was just a little off. The final moments passed by with little effect and had Penn State up by three going into the final period.

Almost as soon as the players got back onto the ice the hitting resumed. Early on, Maine was finally able to establish some offensive zone time and on their second entry they were able to get some scoring chances on goal. Penn State nearly countered with a 2-on-0 but the puck ended up rolling into the corner. Past the 5-minute mark, Bodie Nobes crashed into his own net, taking out Boija and Fink in the process, but no one was injured on the play. As time ticked away, Maine's chances at getting back into the game became increasingly remote. As the period progressed, Penn State seemed to be getting stronger and didn't allow Maine to stay in their zone for long. Near the middle of the period, Nicholas DeGraves got the puck right in the slot in front of the Maine net. His shot went wide but concurrent with the chance he was hit hard by Makar and crashed to the ice in pain. Despite protests from the Penn State bench, no penalty was called on the play. Maine began upping their offensive pressure and was able to get the puck deep into the PSU zone but the Nittany Lions' defense blocked a pair of opportunities. About a minute later, Josh Nadeau took a slashing penalty, costing Maine vital time that they could ill afford. However, just like Penn State had earlier, Maine was able to get a few solid shorthanded chances on Sergeev As they were going for a third scoring chance, Harrison Scott was called for crosschecking and put Maine on the defensive for another 2 minutes. Boija was forced to make several stellar saves during the extended power play but did not allow the Lions to score. Back at even strength, Maine had just 6 minutes remaining to find 3 goals but still found it difficult to fight through the Penn State defense. After forcing an offensive zone draw, Boija was pulled for an extra attacker giving the Bears 6 skaters with just over 4 minutes to play. However, despite their best efforts, Penn State was able to turn over the puck and Dowiak was able to skate down the ice and deposit his second of the night into an open goal. The game calmed down a little after the marker but Maine continued to skate, refusing to knuckle under in spite of the score. The final minutes were completed without too many fireworks and ended with Penn State as the clear victor.

=== Regional final ===
March 30, 2025; 4:30 pm	(2) Connecticut	2–3 (OT) (1–1, 1–1, 0–0, 1–0)	(4) Penn State	PPL Center; Attendance: 6,933

Game reference

Callum Tung
Goalies
Arsenii Sergeev
Referees:
Ryan Hersey
Nathan Wieler
Linesmen:
Eric Contino
Tyler Liffrig

(Richard, Schandor) Joey Muldowney (29) – 3:09	1–0
	1–1	13:27 – Dane Dowiak (12) (Paquette, Peters)
(Gustafsson Nyberg, Spetz) Tabor Heaslip (8) – 31:27	2–1
	2–2	31:57 – J. J. Wiebusch (14) (Cerrato, Mack)
	2–3	77:56 – GW – Matt DiMarsico (17) (Cerrato)

4 min
Penalties
4 min
44
Shots
41

Game summary

=== National semifinal ===
April 10, 2025; 7:30 pm	(T2) Boston University	3–1 (0–0, 2–0, 1–1)	(A4) Penn State	Enterprise Center; Attendance: 16,814

Game reference

Mikhail Yegorov
Goalies
Arsenii Sergeev
Referees:
Ryan Hersey
Nathan Wieler
Linesmen:
Tyler Liffrig
Erik Contino

(Copponi) Jack Hughes (7) – 21:35	1–0
(C. Hutson, Kaplan) Cole Eiserman – 30:44	2–0
	2–1	42:15 – Nicholas DeGraves (4) (Schoen, Mack)
(Willander, Hughes) Jack Harvey – EN – 59:01	3–1

4 min min
Penalties
6 min min
33
Shots
33

Game summary

== Scoring statistics ==
Name	Position	Games	Goals	Assists	Points	PIM
Aiden Fink	RW	40	23	30	53	12
Charlie Cerrato	C	38	15	27	42	58
J. J. Wiebusch	F	40	14	19	33	14
Matt DiMarsico	F	39	17	15	32	30
Danny Dzhaniyev	F	40	12	19	31	4
Reese Laubach	C	35	15	15	30	59
Simon Mack	D	40	3	27	30	6
Dane Dowiak	C/LW	40	12	8	20	20
Ben Schoen	C	37	7	13	20	27
Dylan Lugris	F	34	4	8	12	6
Jimmy Dowd	D	27	1	9	10	21
Nicholas Degraves	F	33	4	5	9	8
Cade Christenson	D	39	2	7	9	10
Carter Schade	D	35	0	9	9	26
Tyler Paquette	C/RW	38	3	5	8	12
Jarod Crespo	D	36	2	5	7	10
Casey Aman	D	36	1	6	7	10
Keaton Peters	F	35	2	4	6	6
Carson Dyck	F	28	1	2	3	0
Nicholas Fascia	D	27	0	3	3	13
Arsenii Sergeev	G	33	0	2	2	0
Braedon Ford	F	14	1	0	1	15
Alex Servagno	F	17	0	1	1	4
Jason Gallucci	D	12	0	0	0	8
Noah Grannan	G	3	0	0	0	0
John Seifarth	G	6	0	0	0	0
Total			139	239	378	389

== Goaltending statistics ==
Name	Games	Minutes	Wins	Losses	Ties	Goals against	Saves	Shut outs	SV %	GAA
John Seifarth	6	313:37	3	2	0	13	146	0	.918	2.49
Arsenii Sergeev	33	1981:42	19	9	4	84	948	4	.919	2.54
Noah Grannan	3	156:48	0	3	0	17	54	0	.761	6.51
Empty Net	-	19:35	-	-	-	6	-	-	-	-
Total	40	2470:42	22	14	4	120	1148	4	.905	2.91

== Rankings ==
Poll	Week																											
Poll	Pre	1	2	3	4	5	6	7	8	9	10	11	12	13	14	15	16	17	18	19	20	21	22	23	24	25	26	27 (Final)
USCHO.com	RV	RV	RV	RV	18	19	18	RV	RV	RV	NR	NR	–	NR	NR	NR	RV	RV	RV	18	18	15	15	11	13	12	–	5
USA Hockey	RV	RV	20	20	18	19	18	RV	NR	NR	NR	NR	–	NR	NR	NR	NR	RV	RV	18	17	16	15	10	13	13	5	5

Note: USCHO did not release a poll in week 12 or 26.
Note: USA Hockey did not release a poll in week 12.

== Awards and honors ==
Player	Award	Ref
Aiden Fink	AHCA All-American West Second Team	
Aiden Fink	All-Big Ten First Team	
Arsenii Sergeev	All-Big Ten Second Team	
Simon Mack	All-Big Ten Second Team	
Cade Christenson	Big Ten All-Rookie Team	
Charlie Cerrato	Big Ten All-Rookie Team	
J. J. Wiebusch	Big Ten All-Tournament Team	

== Players drafted into the NHL ==
Round	Pick	Player	NHL team
1	14	Jackson Smith ^{†}	Columbus Blue Jackets
2	49	Charlie Cerrato	Carolina Hurricanes
4	128	Shea Busch ^{†}	Florida Panthers
7	201	Kale Dach ^{†}	Pittsburgh Penguins

† incoming freshman
