= 2017 Big Ten men's ice hockey tournament =

- Dates: March 16–18, 2017
- Teams: 6
- Finals site: Joe Louis Arena; Detroit, Michigan
- Champions: Penn State (1st title)
- Winning coach: Guy Gadowsky (1st title)
- MVP: Peyton Jones (Penn State)
- Big Ten men's Ice Hockey Tournaments

The 2017 Big Ten Conference Men's Ice Hockey Tournament was the fourth tournament in conference history. It was played between March 16 and March 18, 2017, at Joe Louis Arena in Detroit, Michigan. As tournament champion Penn State was awarded the Big Ten's automatic bid into the 2017 NCAA Division I Men's Ice Hockey Tournament.

== Format ==
All six Big Ten teams participated in the tournament, which was a single-elimination format. Teams were seeded No. 1 through No. 6 according to the final regular season conference standings. In the quarterfinals, No. 3 played No. 6 and No. 4 played No. 5. In the semifinals, No. 2 played the winner of the first game and No. 1 played the winner of the second game (the teams were not reseeded). The two semifinal winners played each other in the Championship Game.

=== Conference standings ===
Note: GP = Games played; W = Wins; L = Losses; T = Ties; PTS = Points; GF = Goals For; GA = Goals Against

2016–17 Big Ten ice hockey standings
	Conference record								Overall record					
	GP	W	L	T	SOW	PTS	GF	GA	GP	W	L	T	GF	GA
#7 Minnesota†	20	14	5	1	0	43	79	58	38	23	12	3	141	104
#17 Wisconsin	20	12	8	0	0	36	72	66	36	20	15	1	122	118
#14 Ohio State	20	11	8	1	1	35	76	62	39	21	12	6	154	113
#8 Penn State*	20	10	9	1	0	31	71	63	39	25	12	2	160	108
Michigan	20	6	12	2	2	22	53	75	35	13	19	3	92	111
Michigan State	20	3	14	3	0	13	47	74	35	7	24	4	84	134
Championship: March 18, 2017 † indicates conference regular season champion; * indicates conference tournament champion Rankings: USCHO.com Top 20 Poll; updated March 6, 2017

== Bracket ==
Quarterfinals; March 16
4	Penn State	4
5	Michigan	1
3	Ohio State	6
6	Michigan State	3

Semifinals; March 17
1	Minnesota	3
4	Penn State	4**
2	Wisconsin	2
3	Ohio State	1

Championship; March 18
4	Penn State	2**
2	Wisconsin	1

Note: * denotes overtime periods.

=== Quarterfinals ===
All times are local (EST) (UTC−4).

==== (3) Ohio State vs. (6) Michigan State ====
March 16	Ohio State	6 – 3	Michigan State	Joe Louis Arena	Recap
Mason Jobst (19) - (Nick Schilkey, Tommy Parran) - 4:09; Nick Schilkey (27) - pp - (Mason Jobst, Dakota Joshua) - 5:44		First period	8:58 - Villiam Haag (7) - (Patr Khodorenko); 12:15 - Dylan Pavelek (2) - (Patr Khodorenko, William Haag); 14:20 - pp - Sam Saliba (10) - (Mason Appleton, Carson Gatt)
Brendon Kearney (3) - (Christian Lampas, Drew Brevig) - 13:54		Second period	No scoring
David Gust (17) - pp - (Mason Jobst) - 0:25; David Gust (17) - (Janik Moser) - 1:38; Tanner Laczynski (10) - (Tommy Parran, Matthew Weis) - 3:51		Third period	No scoring
Matt Tomkins (26 saves / 29 shots)		Goalie stats	Ed Minney (21 saves / 27 shots); John Lethemon (7 saves / 7 shots)

==== (4) Penn State vs. (5) Michigan ====
March 16	Penn State	4 – 1	Michigan	Joe Louis Arena	Recap
Liam Folkes (4) - pp - (Brandon Biro, Erik Autio) - 10:50; Nate Sucese (15) - (Denis Smirnov, Ricky DeRosa) - 13:24; David Goodwin (11) - (Alec Marsh, Vince Pedrie) - 19:31		First period	No scoring
Vince Pedrie (8) - (Nate Sucese) - 1:03		Second period	10:19 - pp - James Sanchez (6) - (Tony Calderone, Cooper Marody)
No scoring		Third period	No scoring
Peyton Jones (30 saves / 31 shots)		Goalie stats	Zach Nagelvoort (30 saves / 34 shots)

=== Semifinals ===
==== (2) Wisconsin vs. (3) Ohio State ====
March 17	Wisconsin	2 – 1	Ohio State	Joe Louis Arena	Recap
Luke Kunin (22) - (JD Greenway, Tim Davison) - 17:18		First period	No scoring
No scoring		Second period	13:48 - pp - Dakota Joshua (12) - (Mason Jobst, Josh Healey)
Will Johnson (10) - (Seamus Malone, Aidan Cavallini) - 1:30		Third period	No scoring
Jack Berry (23 saves / 24 shots)		Goalie stats	Matt Tomkins (24 saves / 26 shots)

==== (1) Minnesota vs. (4) Penn State ====
March 17	Minnesota	3 – 4	2OT	Penn State	Joe Louis Arena	Recap
Rem Pitlick (14) - (Darian Romanko, Ryan Norman) - 7:20; Justin Kloos (18) - pp - (Tyler Sheehy, Rem Pitlick) - 9:55		First period		1:05 - Nikita Pavlychev (4) - (Trevor Hamilton, Ricky DeRosa)
No scoring		Second period		3:48 - Alec Marsh (6) - (Chase Berger, Andrew Sturtz)
Jack Sadek (4) - (Vinni Lettieri) - 3:42		Third period		1:00 - pp - Dylan Richard (9) - (Andrew Sturtz, Vince Pedrie)
No scoring		Second overtime period		13:33 - pp - Erik Autio (3) - (Denis Smirnov, Andrew Sturtz)
Eric Schierhorn (59 saves / 63 shots)		Goalie stats		Peyton Jones (37 saves / 40 shots)

=== Championship ===
==== (2) Wisconsin vs. (4) Penn State ====
March 18	Wisconsin	1 – 2	2OT	Penn State	Joe Louis Arena	Recap
No scoring		First period		15:37 - Liam Folkes (5) - (Brandon Biro, Kris Myllari)
No scoring		Second period		No scoring
Matt Ustaski (6) - pp - (Luke Kunin, Cameron Hughes) - 11:45		Third period		No scoring
No scoring		Second overtime period		6:43 - Liam Folkes (6) - (Brandon Biro, David Thompson)
Jack Berry (33 saves / 35 shots)		Goalie stats		Peyton Jones (51 saves / 52 shots)

=== Tournament awards ===
==== Most Outstanding Player ====
- Goaltender: Peyton Jones (Penn State)

==== All-Tournament Team ====
- Goaltender: Peyton Jones (Penn State)
- Defensemen: Vince Pedrie (Penn State), Erik Autio (Penn State)
- Forwards: Luke Kunin (Wisconsin), Liam Folkes (Penn State), David Gust (Ohio State)
