= Nate Sucese =

American professional ice hockey winger

- Born: July 12, 1996 (age 30) Fairport, New York, U.S.
- Height: 5 ft 9 in (175 cm)
- Weight: 174 lb (79 kg; 12 st 6 lb)
- Position: Left wing
- Shoots: Left
- KHL team Former teams: Shanghai Dragons; Tucson Roadrunners; Iowa Wild; Chicago Wolves; Hartford Wolf Pack
- NHL draft: Undrafted
- Playing career: 2020–present

Nathan Daniel Sucese (born July 12, 1996) is an American professional ice hockey winger for the Shanghai Dragons of the Kontinental Hockey League (KHL). He spent four seasons with the Penn State Nittany Lions and ended his collegiate career as Penn State's all-time leader in points and goals.

== Early life ==
Sucese was born on July 12, 1996, in Buffalo, New York, to parents Sally and John Sucese. While playing for the Buffalo Jr. Sabres, Sucese was drafted 45th overall by the Dubuque Fighting Saints in the 2013 United States Hockey League (USHL) Draft. Following this, he played Connecticut Prep School ice hockey at the Gunnery Prep and three games with the Saints before committing to play NCAA Division I collegiate hockey with the Penn State Nittany Lions.

== Playing career ==
=== Collegiate ===
Sucese played for the Nittany Lions at Penn State University from 2016 to 2020. There, he enrolled in the Donald P. Bellisario College of Communications and majored in communications arts and sciences. During his rookie season, Sucese recorded 17 goals and 19 assists in 38 games. He scored his first collegiate goal in his debut during a 6–3 loss to Mercyhurst. Sucese began his freshman season playing in his usual wing position before being moved to center after an injury to Dylan Richard. As the Nittany Lions qualified for the 2017 Big Ten Men's Ice Hockey Tournament, Sucese recorded a goal and an assist during the 4–1 quarterfinals win over Michigan.

Sucese returned to Penn State for his sophomore season where he recorded 14 goals and 15 assists through 36 games. Early in the season, he received a one-game suspension for delivering an illegal hit during a game against the Minnesota Golden Gophers. Upon returning to the lineup, he registered the sixth hat-trick in Penn State hockey history as he lifted the Nittany Lions over Wisconsin on January 5, 2018. The Nittany Lions returned to the Big Ten Tournament with Sucese's help. During the tournament, he recorded a goal and an assist in a 3–2 loss during the semifinals. As a junior, Sucese set new career highs in goals with 19 and added 18 assists for 37 points.

In November 2019, Sucese tied Andrew Sturtz for the Penn State all-time goals record by recording his 55th career goal in a 6–3 defeat of Minnesota. On January 11, 2020, Sucese passed David Goodwin to eclipse the program's all-time points mark with his 129th career point in 6–2 win against Robert Morris. When reflecting on his milestone, Sucese credited former teammates Andrew Sturtz and Ricky DeRosa for being his mentors. During the remainder of his senior season, Sucese led the Big Ten and ranked tied for 15th nationally with a career-high 38 points, 27 assists, and 11 goals. As a result, he became Penn State's first-ever CCM/AHCA All-American alongside Cole Hults. He also earned First-Team All-Big Ten accolades. Sucese concluded his collegiate career as Penn State's all-time leader in points and goals. His 79 assists, five shorthanded goals, and 470 shots on goal all rank second all-time in program history. Likewise, his career plus-47 rating earned him a fourth all-time program ranking.

=== Professional ===
Sucese concluded his collegiate career by signing an entry-level contract with the Arizona Coyotes. He was subsequently re-assigned to their American Hockey League (AHL) affiliate, the Tucson Roadrunners for the 2020–21 season. Sucese played 36 games with the Roadrunners, recording six goals and seven assists, before leaving the team for the Iowa Wild.

In preparation for the 2021–22 season, Sucese as a free agent agreed to join the Chicago Wolves on a professional try-out contract and remained on the roster to open the season.

Following two seasons with the Chicago Wolves, Sucese left as a free agent and continued in the AHL in signing a one-year deal with the Hartford Wolf Pack, affiliate to the New York Rangers, on July 23, 2024.

Having played his first five professional season exclusively in the AHL, Sucese opted to sign a one-year contract abroad and continue his career in the KHL with newly rebranded club, Shanghai Dragons, on August 19, 2025.

== Career statistics ==
| | | | Regular season | | | | | Playoffs |
| Season | Team | League | GP | G | A | Pts | PIM | GP | G | A | Pts | PIM |
|---|---|---|---|---|---|---|---|---|---|---|---|---|
| 2012–13 | Buffalo Jr. Sabres | OJHL | 3 | 1 | 2 | 3 | 0 | 2 | 1 | 2 | 3 | 0 |
| 2013–14 | The Gunnery | USHS | 28 | 17 | 22 | 39 | 8 | — | — | — | — | — |
| 2013–14 | Dubuque Fighting Saints | USHL | 2 | 1 | 0 | 1 | 0 | — | — | — | — | — |
| 2014–15 | Dubuque Fighting Saints | USHL | 51 | 12 | 15 | 27 | 20 | 8 | 3 | 6 | 9 | 6 |
| 2015–16 | Dubuque Fighting Saints | USHL | 60 | 26 | 33 | 59 | 28 | 12 | 4 | 6 | 10 | 2 |
| 2016–17 | Penn State U. | B1G | 38 | 17 | 19 | 36 | 12 | — | — | — | — | — |
| 2017–18 | Penn State U. | B1G | 36 | 14 | 15 | 29 | 16 | — | — | — | — | — |
| 2018–19 | Penn State U. | B1G | 39 | 19 | 18 | 37 | 24 | — | — | — | — | — |
| 2019–20 | Penn State U. | B1G | 34 | 11 | 27 | 38 | 16 | — | — | — | — | — |
| 2020–21 | Tucson Roadrunners | AHL | 36 | 6 | 7 | 13 | 12 | 1 | 0 | 1 | 1 | 0 |
| 2021–22 | Iowa Wild | AHL | 43 | 4 | 4 | 8 | 10 | — | — | — | — | — |
| 2022–23 | Chicago Wolves | AHL | 69 | 11 | 12 | 23 | 32 | — | — | — | — | — |
| 2023–24 | Chicago Wolves | AHL | 72 | 23 | 14 | 37 | 18 | — | — | — | — | — |
| 2024–25 | Hartford Wolf Pack | AHL | 56 | 8 | 20 | 28 | 12 | — | — | — | — | — |
| 2025–26 | Shanghai Dragons | KHL | 64 | 6 | 10 | 16 | 16 | — | — | — | — | — |
| AHL totals | | | 276 | 52 | 57 | 109 | 84 | 1 | 0 | 1 | 1 | 0 |

== Awards and honors ==
| Award | Year | Ref |
USHL
| Second All-Star Team | 2016 | |
College
| B1G First All-Star Team | 2020 | |
| NCAA East Second All-American Team | 2020 | |
