= David Goodwin =

American ice hockey player

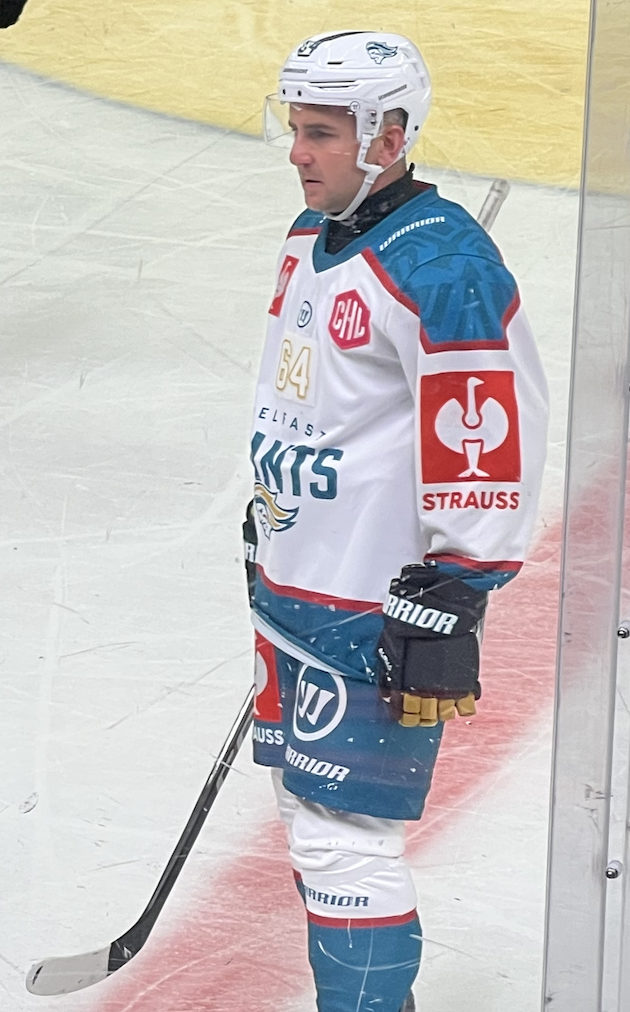
- Goodwin playing in the Champions Hockey League on September 5, 2025.
- Born: February 27, 1992 (age 34) St. Louis, Missouri
- Height: 5 ft 10 in (178 cm)
- Weight: 190 lb (86 kg; 13 st 8 lb)
- Position: Center
- Shoots: Left
- EIHL team Former teams: Belfast Giants; SaiPa; Mora IK; Cracovia Krakow; CH Jaca
- NHL draft: Undrafted
- Playing career: 2017–present

David Goodwin (born February 27, 1992) is an American ice hockey center playing for Belfast Giants in the UK EIHL. Goodwin previously played for Cracovia Krakow, IK Oskarshamn of the Swedish Hockey League and Mora IK. Goodwin also previously played for the Penn State Nittany Lions.

He first arrived in Belfast for the 2019/20 season before moving to several other European clubs but returned to Belfast to complete the 2023/24 season.

== Personal life ==
He grew up in St Louis Missouri and started playing ice hockey there. In December 2025 he married Shannon Campbell in Belfast. She is the Director of campus ministry for the Catholic chaplaincy at Queen's University, Belfast.
