= Guy Gadowsky =

Canadian ice hockey player and coach

Current position
- Title: Head coach
- Team: Penn State
- Conference: Big Ten
- Record: 254–218–34 (.536)

Biographical details
- Born: August 10, 1967 (age 59); Edmonton, Alberta, Canada
- Education: Colorado College

Playing career
- 1984–1985: Fort Saskatchewan Traders
- 1985–1989: Colorado College
- 1991–1992: San Diego Gulls
- 1991–1993: Richmond Renegades
- 1992–1993: St. John's Maple Leafs
- 1993–1994: Canadian National Team
- 1993–1994: Straubing EHC
- 1994–1995: Prince Edward Island Senators
- 1995–1996: Fresno Falcons
- Position: Right wing

Coaching career (HC unless noted)
- 1995–1996: Oklahoma Coyotes
- 1996–1997: Fresno Falcons
- 1996–1997: San Jose Rhinos
- 1997–1998: Fresno Fighting Falcons
- 1998–1999: Fresno Falcons
- 1999–2004: Alaska–Fairbanks
- 2004–2011: Princeton
- 2011–present: Penn State

Head coaching record
- Overall: 427–416–71 (.506)
- Tournaments: 5–8 (.385)

Accomplishments and honors

Championships
- 2008 ECAC Tournament champion; 2017 Big Ten Tournament champion

Awards
- 2002 CCHA Coach of the Year; 2008 Tim Taylor Award; 2015 Big Ten Coach of the Year

Guy Gadowsky (born August 10, 1967) is a Canadian ice hockey coach and former professional ice hockey player. Gadowsky is currently the head coach of the Penn State University men's ice hockey team.

== Early life ==
Gadowsky attended Strathcona High School alongside sports broadcaster Gord Miller. Growing up in Edmonton, he played in the South Side Athletic Club chain. In 1984 he advanced to the Alberta Junior Hockey League, scoring 27 goals and 63 points in 60 games during his rookie season with the Fort Saskatchewan Traders, earning a scholarship to Colorado College.

== Career ==
Gadowsky played collegiate hockey at Colorado College and played professional hockey for the San Diego Gulls, Richmond Renegades, St. John's Maple Leafs and Prince Edward Island Senators, and Fresno Falcons. He also represented Canada on the 1993–94 Canada men's national ice hockey team, recording three goals and three assists in six games. Gadowsky also spent one season with the San Jose Rhinos professional roller hockey team in 1994.

Following his retirement as a player in 1996, Gadowsky spent three seasons as the head coach of the Fresno Falcons of the West Coast Hockey League, leading the team to three straight Taylor Cup playoff appearances. In 1999, he became the head coach of Alaska-Fairbanks and coached the team for five seasons. In 2004 Gadowsky was hired as the head coach at Princeton University. During his tenure at Princeton he led the Tigers to the 2008 ECAC Hockey Championship and to back-to-back NCAA Tournament appearances in 2008 and 2009. On April 25, 2011, he became the head coach of the Penn State Nittany Lions men's ice hockey team, becoming the program's first varsity head coach in the NCAA era for Penn State. Gadowsky took over the program starting in the 2011–12 season, during the team's transition from ACHA DI level to NCAA Division I. The team finished the regular season with a record of 27–4 and received a bid to the 2012 ACHA DI National Tournament as the number one seed and ranked first in the ACHA. The team defeated West Virginia 4–1, followed by Oklahoma 6–3 in the first rounds of the tournament before Penn State lost 3–5 to Oakland (MI) in the semifinal round. In first year as head coach of Penn State, the team finished the season with an overall record of 29–5.

Gadowsky coached the U.S. Collegiate Selects (an all-star team made up of NCAA Division I players) at the 2025 Spengler Cup, ultimately finishing second.

== Personal life ==
Gadowsky has two sons, Mac and Magnus. Mac plays college ice hockey for Penn State, while Magnus plays for Amherst College.

== Head coaching record ==
=== Minor League ===
| Team | Year | Regular season | | | | | | | Postseason |
| Team | Year | G | W | L | T | OTL | Pts | Finish | Result |
|---|---|---|---|---|---|---|---|---|---|
| Fresno Falcons | 1996–97 | 64 | 38 | 20 | 0 | 6 | 82 | 3rd in WCHL | Lost in 1st round |
| Fresno Fighting Falcons | 1997–98 | 64 | 33 | 29 | 0 | 2 | 68 | 3rd in WCHL Southern Div. | Lost in 1st round |
| Fresno Falcons | 1998–99 | 70 | 35 | 31 | 0 | 4 | 74 | 2nd in WCHL Southern Div. | Lost in 2nd round |
| Total | | 198 | 106 | 80 | 0 | 12 | 224 | | |

=== College ===
Record table
| Season | Team | Overall | Conference | Standing | Postseason |
|---|---|---|---|---|---|
Alaska–Fairbanks Nanooks (CCHA) (1999–2004)
| 1999–00 | Alaska–Fairbanks | 6–25–3 | 4–22–3 | 12th | |
| 2000–01 | Alaska–Fairbanks | 9–19–8 | 7–14–7 | t-9th | CCHA First Round |
| 2001–02 | Alaska–Fairbanks | 22–12–3 | 15–10–3 | 4th | CCHA Quarterfinals |
| 2002–03 | Alaska–Fairbanks | 15–14–7 | 10–11–7 | t-8th | CCHA First Round |
| 2003–04 | Alaska–Fairbanks | 16–19–1 | 14–13–1 | 6th | CCHA First Round |
| Alaska–Fairbanks: | | 68–89–22 | 50–70–21 | | |
Princeton Tigers (ECAC Hockey) (2004–2011)
| 2004–05 | Princeton | 8–20–3 | 6–14–2 | 10th | ECAC First Round |
| 2005–06 | Princeton | 10–18–3 | 7–12–3 | t-9th | ECAC First Round |
| 2006–07 | Princeton | 15–16–3 | 10–10–2 | t-6th | ECAC Quarterfinals |
| 2007–08 | Princeton | 21–14–0 | 14–8–0 | 2nd | NCAA Midwest Regional Semifinals |
| 2008–09 | Princeton | 22–12–1 | 14–8–0 | 3rd | NCAA West Regional Semifinals |
| 2009–10 | Princeton | 12–16–3 | 8–12–2 | 8th | ECAC First Round |
| 2010–11 | Princeton | 17–13–2 | 11–9–2 | t-4th | ECAC First Round |
| Princeton: | | 105–109–15 | 70–73–11 | | |
Penn State Nittany Lions (ACHA) (2011–2012)
| 2011–12 | Penn State | 29–5–0 | | 1st | ACHA Semifinals |
| Penn State: | | 29–5–0 | | | |
Penn State Nittany Lions Independent (2012–2013)
| 2012–13 | Penn State | 13–14–0 | | | |
| Penn State: | | 13–14–0 | | | |
Penn State Nittany Lions (Big Ten) (2013–present)
| 2013–14 | Penn State | 8–26–2 | 3–16–1–0 | 6th | Big Ten Semifinals |
| 2014–15 | Penn State | 18–15–4 | 10–9–1 | 4th | Big Ten Quarterfinals |
| 2015–16 | Penn State | 21–13–4 | 10–9–1–1 | 3rd | Big Ten Semifinals |
| 2016–17 | Penn State | 25–12–2 | 10–9–1–0 | 4th | NCAA Midwest Regional Finals |
| 2017–18 | Penn State | 18–15–5 | 9–10–5–2 | 4th | NCAA Midwest Regional Semifinals |
| 2018–19 | Penn State | 22–15–2 | 11–12–1–1 | 4th | Big Ten Runner-Up |
| 2019–20 | Penn State | 20–10–4 | 12–8–4–1 | 1st | Tournament Cancelled |
| 2020–21 | Penn State | 10–12–0 | 7–10–0 | 5th | Big Ten Semifinals |
| 2021–22 | Penn State | 17–20–1 | 6–17–1 | T–5th | Big Ten Semifinals |
| 2022–23 | Penn State | 22–16–1 | 10–13–1 | T–5th | NCAA Midwest Regional Final |
| 2023–24 | Penn State | 15–18–3 | 7–14–3 | 6th | Big Ten Quarterfinals |
| 2024–25 | Penn State | 22–14–4 | 9–11–4 | 5th | NCAA Frozen Four |
| 2025–26 | Penn State | 21–14–2 | 12–10–2 | 3rd | NCAA Albany Regional semifinals |
| 2026–27 | Penn State | 2–4–0 | 0–0–0 | | |
| Penn State: | | 254–218–34 (.536) | 116–140–25 (.457) | | |
| Total: | | 427–416–71 (.506) | | | |
National champion Postseason invitational champion Conference regular season champion Conference regular season and conference tournament champion Division regular season champion Division regular season and conference tournament champion Conference tournament champion

== See also ==
- List of college men's ice hockey coaches with 400 wins

Awards and achievements
| Preceded by Enrico Blasi | CCHA Coach of the Year; 2001–02 | Succeeded by Bob Daniels |
| Preceded by Joe Marsh | Tim Taylor Award; 2007–08 | Succeeded by Keith Allain |
| Preceded by Don Lucia | Big Ten Coach of the Year; 2014–15 | Succeeded by Red Berenson |
