= Pegula Ice Arena =

Sports arena in Pennsylvania, US

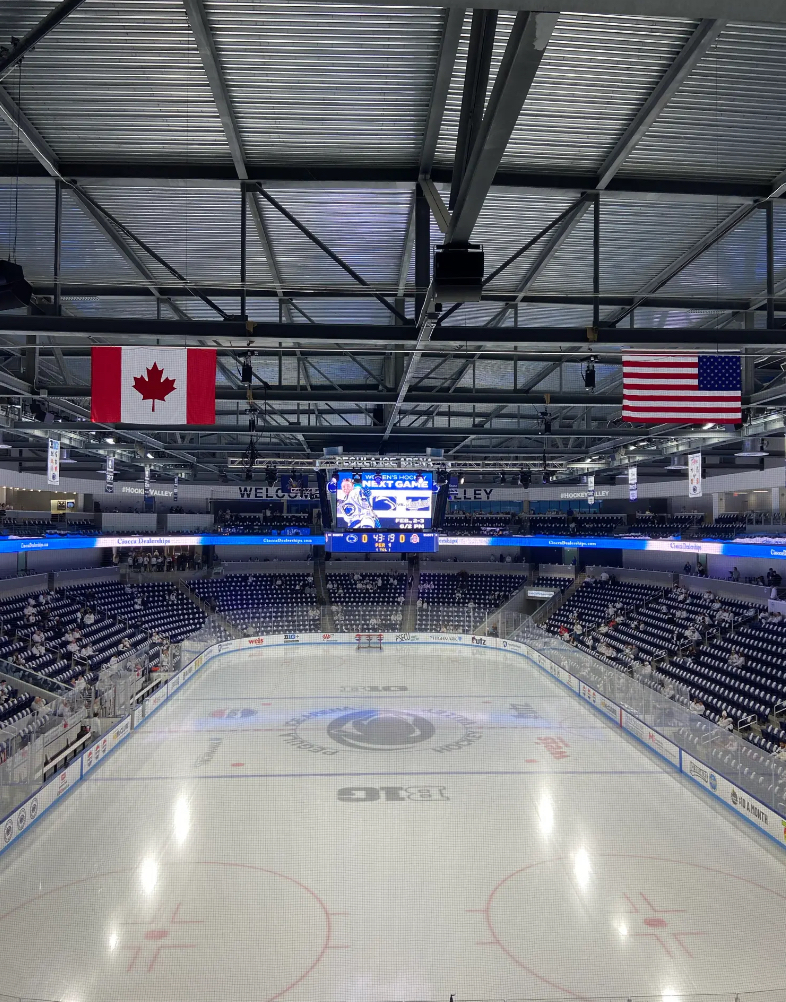
- Pegula Ice Arena in 2024.
- Interactive map of Pegula Ice Arena
- Address: 250 University Drive; University Park, Pennsylvania 16802
- Coordinates: 40°48′26″N 77°51′24″W
- Owner: Pennsylvania State University
- Operator: Pennsylvania State University
- Capacity: 6,014 (Ice hockey)
- Type: Indoor Arena
- Event: Sporting Events
- Scoreboard: Center Hung

Construction
- Groundbreaking: April 20, 2012
- Opened: 11 October 2013 (vs. Army)
- Cost: $88 Million
- Architects: Crawford Architects; Bohlin Cywinski Jackson
- Project manager: Mortenson Construction
- Structural engineer: Thornton Tomasetti
- Services engineer: KJWW Engineering

Tenants
- Penn State Nittany Lions men's ice hockey (2013–present); Penn State Nittany Lions women's ice hockey (2013–present)

The Pegula Ice Arena is a 6,014-seat multi-purpose arena in College Township, Pennsylvania on the campus of Penn State University. As with all locations on the Penn State campus, its mailing address is University Park. The facility is located on the corner of Curtin Road and University Drive near the Bryce Jordan Center. The arena is named after Kim and Terry Pegula for their donations to fund the arena and it replaced the 1,350-seat Penn State Ice Pavilion.

The arena contains two ice surfaces. One, the Varsity Rink, is used for Penn State Hockey games and other main events. It has a capacity of 6,014. The other, the Community Rink, has a capacity of 300 and functions as a public ice rink for the community.

== History ==
On September 17, 2010 it was officially announced that the Penn State men's and women's ice hockey programs would move to the NCAA Division I level for the 2012-13 season. The teams competed in the existing 1,350-seat Penn State Ice Pavilion until the new arena was completed in the fall of 2013.

On November 5, 2010 the Penn State Board of Trustees appointed Crawford Architects and Bohlin Cywinski Jackson as the architects for the new arena. Crawford Architects has worked on projects in the US and internationally and Bohlin Cywinski Jackson designed the Biobehavioral Health Building, currently under construction on the PSU campus.

It was announced on January 21, 2011 that the arena would be named in honor of Kim and Terry Pegula, whose $88 million donation helped fund the arena and the creation of men's and women's varsity ice hockey programs.

On February 15, 2011, it was announced that the main lobby of the arena would be named after the Silvis family, following a $1 million donation by Paul and Nancy Silvis.

The arena opened on October 11, 2013 when the PSU men’s ice hockey team hosted Army.

Pegula Ice Arena is capable of hosting other on-ice events, including ice shows and National Hockey League and American Hockey League exhibition games. The first NHL exhibition game at the arena, featuring Pegula's Buffalo Sabres hosting the Minnesota Wild, took place in September 2016, seeing the Minnesota Wild score the game-winning goal with less than 5 seconds in regulation for a 2-1 win. The Sabres would return to the arena for a preseason game in 2017. The main ice arena features a main competition ice arena with seating for about 6,000 spectators. The facility also includes a practice rink, offices, locker rooms and player areas. The facility was entirely privately funded as part of the $88 million gift, the largest in the university's history, to advance the men's and women's ice hockey programs to the NCAA Division I level and provide a suitable facility for that move.

On January 25, 2025, the Arena reached its record capacity of 6,604 during Penn State’s 3-2 overtime win against Ohio State.

== See also ==
- Penn State Nittany Lions men's ice hockey
- Penn State Nittany Lions women's ice hockey
- Penn State Nittany Lions
