= Brandon Biro =

Canadian ice hockey player

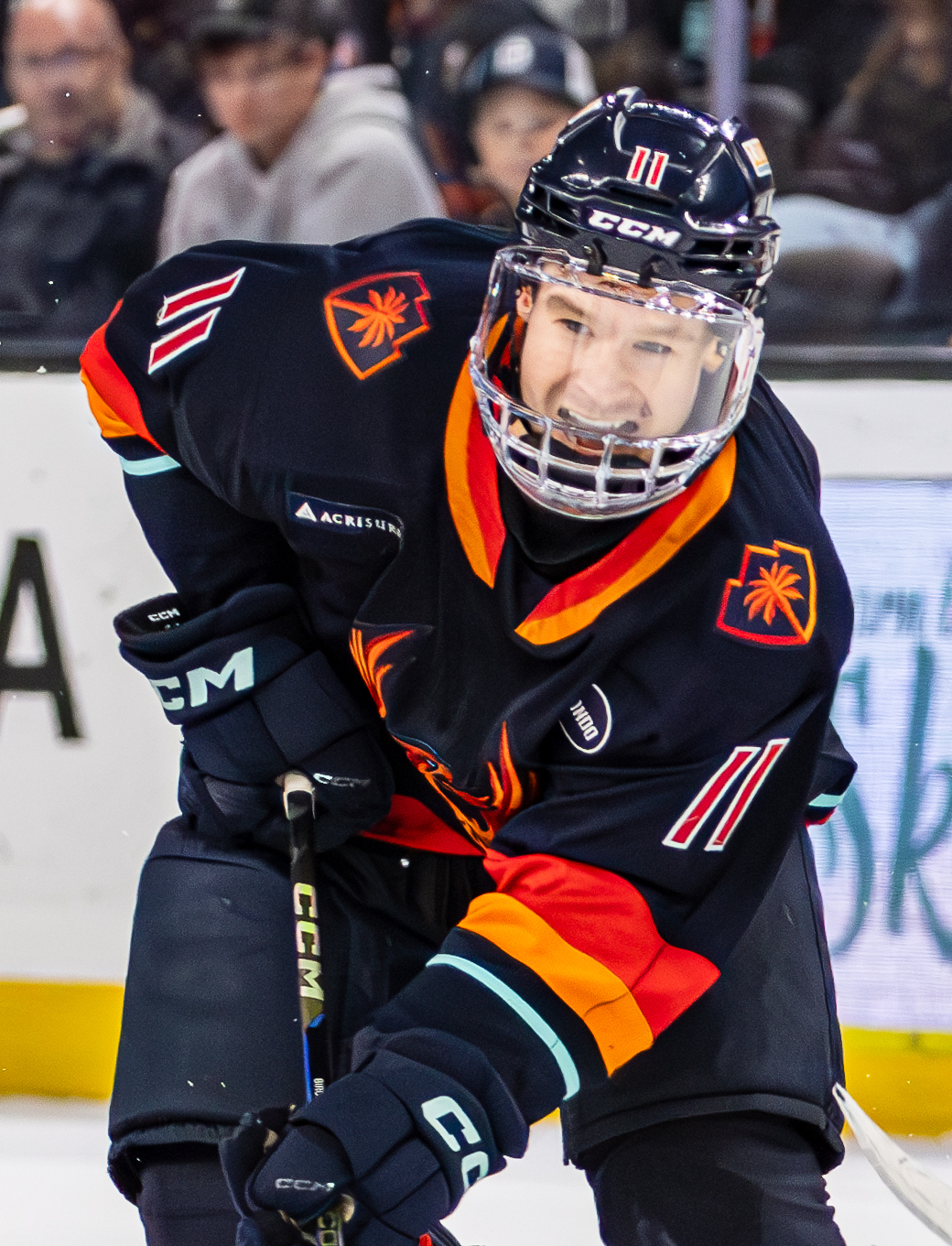
- Biro with the Coachella Valley Firebirds in 2025
- Born: March 11, 1998 (age 28) Sherwood Park, Alberta, Canada
- Height: 5 ft 11 in (180 cm)
- Weight: 170 lb (77 kg; 12 st 2 lb)
- Position: Left wing
- Shoots: Left
- DEL team Former teams: Löwen Frankfurt; Buffalo Sabres; Ak Bars Kazan; Spartak Moscow
- NHL draft: Undrafted
- Playing career: 2020–present

Brandon Biro (born March 11, 1998) is a Canadian professional ice hockey left winger for Löwen Frankfurt of the Deutsche Eishockey Liga (DEL). He played collegiately at Penn State.

== Playing career ==
=== Amateur ===
Biro played two seasons with the Spruce Grove Saints of the Alberta Junior Hockey League, winning the league's Rookie of the Year award in the 2014–15 season.

Biro played four seasons for the Penn State Nittany Lions. At the end of his collegiate career, he was eighth all-time for Penn State in goals (41), third all-time in assists (75), and fourth all-time in points (116).

=== Professional ===
On March 18, 2020, Biro was signed by the Buffalo Sabres of the National Hockey League as an undrafted free agent. He made his professional debut with Buffalo's AHL affiliate, the Rochester Americans, on February 12, 2021.

Biro made his NHL debut for the Sabres on February 23, 2022, in a game against the Montreal Canadiens.

Biro was called up to the Sabres on October 30, 2023. In his first game after the call up, Biro scored his first NHL goal in a game against the Philadelphia Flyers, as well as an empty net goal in the same game for his second career goal.

Biro left the Sabres organization after four seasons and was signed as a free agent to a one-year, $775,000 deal with the Seattle Kraken on July 1, 2024.

After concluding his contract with the Kraken, Biro opted to pursue a career abroad in agreeing to a one-year contract with Russian club, Ak Bars Kazan of the KHL, on July 2, 2025. He was traded mid-season to HC Spartak Moscow, helping the club advance to the Last 16 of the playoffs.

Biro concluded his tenure in the KHL on the completion of the season and was signed to a one-year deal with German club, Löwen Frankfurt of the DEL, on July 21, 2026.

== Personal life ==
Biro's younger brother, Jordan, played collegiately for Colorado College and American International College before joining the Greensboro Gargoyles of the ECHL.

His father, Rob, played collegiate soccer at the University of Alberta. He also played one season with the Winnipeg Fury of the Canadian Soccer League. He now works for Edmonton Catholic Schools as a soccer director.

== Career statistics ==
			Regular season					Playoffs
Season	Team	League	GP	G	A	Pts	PIM	GP	G	A	Pts	PIM
2011–12	Sherwood Park Flyers	AMBHL	33	5	9	14	4	—	—	—	—	—
2012–13	Sherwood Park Flyers	AMBHL	30	28	36	64	30	5	2	3	5	0
2013–14	Sherwood Park Kings	AMHL	22	3	13	16	10	—	—	—	—	—
2014–15	Spruce Grove Saints	AJHL	57	21	33	54	18	16	7	7	14	2
2015–16	Spruce Grove Saints	AJHL	40	32	25	57	6	14	10	10	20	2
2016–17	Penn State U.	B1G	39	6	14	20	19	—	—	—	—	—
2017–18	Penn State U.	B1G	37	9	22	31	18	—	—	—	—	—
2018–19	Penn State U.	B1G	37	16	24	40	4	—	—	—	—	—
2019–20	Penn State U.	B1G	25	10	15	25	8	—	—	—	—	—
2020–21	Rochester Americans	AHL	15	2	3	5	4	—	—	—	—	—
2021–22	Rochester Americans	AHL	48	12	29	41	20	10	1	2	3	0
2021–22	Buffalo Sabres	NHL	1	0	0	0	0	—	—	—	—	—
2022–23	Rochester Americans	AHL	49	16	35	51	12	—	—	—	—	—
2023–24	Rochester Americans	AHL	59	16	27	43	28	5	2	2	4	2
2023–24	Buffalo Sabres	NHL	5	2	0	2	0	—	—	—	—	—
2024–25	Coachella Valley Firebirds	AHL	56	6	28	34	19	5	1	1	2	2
2025–26	Ak Bars Kazan	KHL	33	1	9	10	6	—	—	—	—	—
2025–26	Spartak Moscow	KHL	9	1	4	5	0	1	0	0	0	0
NHL totals			6	2	0	2	0	—	—	—	—	—
KHL totals			42	2	13	15	6	1	0	0	0	0

== Awards and honours ==
Award	Year
AJHL
North All-Rookie Team	2015
Rookie of the Year	2015
College
B1G Honourable Mention All-Star Team	2019
