= Crazylegs Classic =

Annual running race in Wisconsin, US

The Crazylegs Classic is an annual 8 kilometres (5.0 mi) running race and 2 miles (3.2 km) walk held each spring in Madison, Wisconsin in the United States. The course starts at the Library Mall at the University of Wisconsin-Madison campus and ends at the Kohl Center. The race, first held in 1982, was named in honor of Elroy "Crazylegs" Hirsch. Proceeds from the race benefit University of Wisconsin–Madison athletics programs.

The idea for the race was hatched in late 1981 by Tom Grantham, Ken Sparks, and Rich Backus, who wanted to raise money to support Wisconsin athletics. As admirers of Hirsch, who was then serving as UW–Madison's athletic director, they asked his permission to name it the "Crazylegs Run" in his honor. Grantham continues to serve as general chairman on the Crazylegs Classic Executive Committee. Hirsch greeted runners at the start and finish of the race between 1981 and 1996.

The first race in 1982 attracted 1,525 runners and raised $9,500. The event grew in popularity and the walk was added in 1987 with 676 walkers the first year. The event has grown, reaching a record high of 20,445 registrants in 2010. Since its inaugural race, it has attracted more than 229,000 runners and walkers.

Runner's World magazine has rated the Crazylegs Classic as one of America's Best 100 Events. Readers participating in the Capital Times/Wisconsin State Journal Reader's Choice Award survey have voted the classic the #1 Favorite Local Running Event every year since 1995.

In 2002, the Road Runners Club of America chose the Crazylegs Classic one of twenty "Great Races! Great Places!" events.

The race starts at the Library Mall on the University of Wisconsin-Madison campus and ends at the Kohl Center.

Prior to 2019, the Crazylegs Classic started opposite the State Capitol Building, going down Wisconsin Avenue, moving onto the campus over Observatory Drive to Picnic Point and returning down University Avenue to Camp Randall where it ended at the 50 yard line. The route change was the result of Madison Common Council implementing new rules for street use permits in downtown Madison.

The Crazylegs Classic has experienced suboptimal weather conditions. In 1988, racers fast sleet and high winds. In 1994, Madison received 7.8 inches (20 cm) snow on race day. And in 2019, Madison received 7 inches (18 cm) snow.

In 1995, University of Wisconsin-Madison Chancellor David Ward ordered the Crazylegs Classic course to be rerouted given other events taking place on campus. It was the first time in 14 years the course had been changed and the first time the Observatory Drive Hill was not part of the course.

The race was canceled in 2020 and was run as a virtual race in 2021 as a result of COVID-19.

The Crazylegs Classic has honored notable individuals by having them serve as grand marshal for the race, including:

- 1995, college American football coach Barry Alvarez
- 2000, University of Wisconsin Marching Band director Michael Leckrone
- 2001, Wisconsin Alumni Association director Arlie Mucks
- 2002, college ice hockey coach Jeff Sauer
- 2005, professional American football player Pat Richter
- 2007, college American football coach Bret Bielema
- 2008, professional American football player Ron Dayne
- 2009, "Miracle on the Hudson" pilot Jeffrey Skiles
- 2010, professional ice hockey player Jessie Vetter
- 2011, wife of Elroy Hirsch Ruth Hirsch
- 2012, professional American football player Pat Richter
- 2013, college American football coach Gary Andersen
- 2014, golfer Julie Redders
- 2015, college volleyball coach Kelly Sheffield
- 2016, college basketball coach Greg Gard
- 2017, University of Wisconsin Marching Band director Michael Leckrone
- 2018, professional basketball player Alando Tucker
- 2019, professional American football player Joe Thomas
- 2022, Olympian and professional ice hockey player Sarah Nurse
- 2024, legal scholar and chancellor Jennifer Mnookin
