= Claire Voyant =

Claire Voyant may refer to:

- Claire Voyant (comic strip) (1943–1948), an American syndicated comic strip
- Claire Voyant, the secret identity of the Timely Comics superheroine called the Black Widow (1940)
- Claire Voyant (band), a dream pop trio
- Claire Voyant (album), the 1995 album of Claire Voyant
