= Lovespirals =

US musical group

- Also known as: Lovespirals Downwards (2024–present)
- Origin: United States
- Genres: Dream pop, electronic
- Years active: 1999–present
- Labels: Chillcuts, Projekt Records, Loverush Digital
- Spinoff of: Love Spirals Downwards
- Members: Ryan Lum; Anji Bee
- Website: www.lovespirals.com

Lovespirals is an American dream pop and electronic music band from Southern California, featuring husband and wife, multi-instrumentalist/producer Ryan Lum and lyricist/vocalist Anji Bee.

== History ==
The origins of Lovespirals began with a 1998 side project of Lum's Projekt Records band, Love Spirals Downwards. The new outfit found Lum teaming up with Doron Orenstein and Gabriel D. Vine of Subliminal Records duo, Monkey Bars for the instrumental track "Beatitude". Bee joined in as vocalist soon after.

At first, Lovespirals' music picked up where Lum left off with Flux, the final Love Spirals Downwards' studio album, creating drum and bass and downtempo compositions. The first officially released song was a jazzstep remix of Claire Voyant's "Bittersweet," for Time Again: A Collection of Remixes, in April 2000. The remix was attributed to Love Spirals Downwards, though the song was composed by Lum and Bee, with saxophone contributions by Orenstein.

In July 2000, the band launched an Mp3.com page under the name "Lovespirals", which included the first song featuring Bee's vocals, "Ecstatic". They followed it up with a second digital single called "Hand in Hand" in August. These tracks were pressed to acetate for Lum's use in DJ sets during promotions for the Love Spirals Downwards career retrospective CD, Temporal: A Collection of Music Past & Present, released earlier that year. In 2001, these songs were released via an Mp3.com enhanced CDR called the Ecstatic EP, along with a new track called "Spanning Time" and their Claire Voyant remix. StarVox Magazine listed the Ecstatic EP and Time Again in their Top 10 Staff Favorites of 2001, citing Lovespirals and Claire Voyant's "triphop-influenced grooves" as "Goth's Next Big Thing." Mp3.com featured the EP in their "Hot Artist Spotlight" on January 25, 2002, stating:

For those fans of Good Looking Records, Lovespirals could easily be found amongst their ranks in talent and sound.

By 2002, however, the band had eschewed drum and bass in favor of more dream pop-focused territory, albeit with jazz and world flavorings, for their first full-length CD, Windblown Kiss, released on Lum's longtime label, Projekt. The album featured two collaborations with former Projekt labelmate Sean Bowley of Eden, as well as sax contributions by Orenstein. Windblown Kiss was linked to another burgeoning gothic subgenre, "slow teary-eyed gothic jazz":

Lovespirals’ "Windblown Kiss" of 2002 was heralded as the style’s official birth and fulfilled the lifelong dreams of darkwave and lounge lovers like myself by blending the melancholy, ethereal vocals of the former with the breezy, slow sway of the latter.

After leaving Projekt to form their own label, Chillcuts, Lovespirals returned in 2005 with Free & Easy. This second album continued the band's exploration of jazz, but in an electronica-oriented style. As part of the album's promotion, Peace Love Productions held a remix contest for the album's first single, "Walk Away." An entry by Bitstream Dream, whom Bee has collaborated with on several songs, was one of Lovespirals' first tracks deemed podsafe. Podsafe Music Network founder Adam Curry premiered "Walk Away (Bitstream Dream Remix)" on Daily Source Code #261, on October 17, 2005. This remix currently holds the No. 2 position on the Podsafe Music Network's Top Ten Most Played on Podcasts chart for the downtempo genre. The No. 1 position is held by the second Free & Easy single, "Love Survives". Also in the downtempo Top Ten is the 2004 Bitstream Dream song, "Phantasma," featuring Bee's vocals and lyrics.

In June 2005, Lovespirals began a band podcast titled "Chillin' with Lovespirals". The show's theme music was the opening intro from the title track to "Free & Easy." In addition to band news, the podcast discussed "recent trends in music and technology". Chillin' with Lovespirals became available on the iTunes Store in July 2005. In 2006, the podcast signed on with PodShow under the extended title of "Chillin' with Lovespirals: Insights of an Indie Band".

Bee was signed to PodShow as a podcast producer in February 2006. Her first PodShow property was the weekly podsafe chillout music podcast, The Chillcast with Anji Bee, which she originally launched in January 2006 on Ourmedia as "The Chillcuts Chillcast" as a tie-in to the band's label. The show's theme song was created by Lovespirals. The Chillcast was added to the Adam Curry's PodShow lineup on Sirius Stars in January 2007.

Lovespirals' third album Long Way From Home, released October 23, 2007, was a return to guitar and vocal-based compositions, more in the dream pop style, with Americana/alt country influences. The album was named after a line in the American spiritual "Motherless Child", which was the first single from Long Way From Home. Lovespirals' rendition of "Motherless Child" was first released on the Podsafe Music Network on June 1, 2007, and has been featured on podcasts including Daily Source Code, Accident Hash, Financial Aid Podcast, PodShow Radio, and the Podsafe Music Countdown Top 10. "Motherless Child" held the No. 3 spot on the Most Played on Podcasts chart for the downtempo genre on Music Alley (formerly known as the Podsafe Music Network), while the album's second single, "This Truth," ranked No. 7 on the same chart.

The two lead singles from Long Way From Home were also released as digital EPs, with downtempo, house and other electronica genre remixes recalling the band's prior sound. The Motherless ChildEP, released September 16, 2007, contained remixes by Hungry Lucy, Karmacoda, MoShang, Chris Caulder (of Beauty's Confusion), the Black Channel Citizen, and Lovespirals' own Ryan Lum. A year later, the band assembled a 10-song collection of remixes culled from their second Peace Love Production remix contest to create the This Truth EP. Remixers included the contest-winning producer Pomatic, runner-up Kambronn and Projekt Records labelmate Soul Whirling Somewhere. All of these remixes, plus the still-unreleased Walk Away EP, are available on Mevio's Music Alley for free download and use by podcasters and Internet DJs.

In 2009, UK dance label Loverush Digital released another set of "This Truth" remixes, branded as Damien.S VS Lovespirals. This seven-song EP included remixes by Juno Sinclair and Craig Bailey, Avatar One, Thomas Oldani and Adam Fielding, as well as two mixes by Damien.S. The single reached number No. 2 on the DMC World Wide Trance Charts, No. 4 on the DMC World Wide House Charts, No. 8 on the UK Music Week Club Charts, and received positive DJ reactions from Paul Wilkins (Hed Kandi), Pedro Del Mar (Germany), Paul Hughes (Energy FM) and Cliff Bush (Saint FM). The single was also supported by a Housesession with Denny Dowd on Juice FM.

Lovespirals fourth album, Future Past, was officially released on January 1, 2010, though the band offered the album in digipak CD format on their own webstore as early as November 16, 2009. The album's first single, "Shine," received the GarageBand Reviewer's Pick Award for Best Female Vocals and the Track of the Day Award for the alternative pop genre. Various songs from the album received airplay from Groovera, Soma FM, the Properly Chilled show on WXGR FM and WSUM. Two cuts from the album, "Love" and "Feel So Good," were re-released in 2010 and 2011, respectively, in the form of extended singles featuring remixes by musical collaborators including Lum's former Projekt Records labelmate, Soul Whirling Somewhere, and Bee's future collaborator, Falling You. The Feel So Good EP was the result of a remix contest hosted by Sony Acid Planet, in which Swiss producer, Yumenomado, won a copy of ACID Pro, 5 ACID loop libraries, and Lovespirals CD discography, in addition to the EP placement.

The duo's fifth full-length outing took considerably longer to come to fruition than previous albums, though the band was still releasing music during the 8-year gap. Life Goes On, released November 2, 2018, features 2 singles (plus a third b-side) that had been released exclusively via Bandcamp. "Brother Against Brother" was released on March 8, 2014, along with its b-side, "Breath of Life." Music videos for each song were also included in this digital single, and these appeared on the band's YouTube page, as well. The latter track had originally been composed as a soundtrack piece for an independent documentary of the same name, though the version included on the album is an updated recording. Their next single, "Heartstrings," was released in the same digital single with video fashion, though this time the Bandcamp exclusive included an earlier version of the song from 2005 as the b-side. Also released during this interim, though not included on the album, was an original holiday song, "Happy Holidays," recorded for the 2012 Projekt Records compilation, Ornamental. The duo re-released it 4 years later on their Bandcamp page, along with the original 2010 recording by vocalist, Anji Bee. Echoes (radio program) has shown support for the album, particularly the song, "Foolish Heart," which appeared on episodes 1849B, 1851C, and 1901D.

Lovespirals' music has been featured internationally on network television and cable shows and stations including The Oprah Winfrey Show, The Martha Stewart Show, E!'s Gastineau Girls, VH1, MTV, and Logo.

Since 2024 Lovespirals (Ryan Lum and Anji Bee) morphed into Love Spirals Downwards, continued releasing music under "Lovespirals Downwards" moniker.

== Members ==
=== Current lineup ===
- Ryan Lum – guitar, bass, electronics, programming, keyboards (1999–present)
- Anji Lum (Anji Bee) – vocals (2000–present)

=== Former session members ===
- Doron Orenstein – saxophone (1999–2005)
- Gabriel D. Vine – Rhodes piano (1999–2001, 2005)
- Sean Bowley – acoustic guitar, vocals (2002)
- James Moran – drums (1998)

== Discography ==
=== Studio albums ===
- Windblown Kiss (2002, Projekt Records)
- Free & Easy (2005, Chillcuts)
- Long Way From Home (2007, Chillcuts)
- Future Past (2010, Chillcuts)
- Life Goes On (2018, Chillcuts)

=== Singles & EPs ===
- Ecstatic EP (2001, Mp3.com) (2011, Chillcuts)
- Motherless Child (Remixes) (2007, Chillcuts)
- This Truth EP (2008, Chillcuts)
- This Truth EP as Damien.S VS Lovespirals (2009, Loverush Digital)
- Walk Away EP (2008, Amie St) (2012, Chillcuts)
- Love EP (2010, Chillcuts)
- Feel So Good EP (2011, Chillcuts)
- Happy Holidays (2013, Chillcuts)
- Brother Against Brother (2014, Chillcuts)
- Heartstrings (2016, Chillcuts)
- Why Not Today (2020, Chillcuts)
- Smile EP (2022, Chillcuts)
- The Call (2022, Chillcuts)
- Lonely Sunset (2022, Chillcuts)
- This Truth (Soul Whirling Somewhere Remix) (2023, Chillcuts)
- Noumenon (2024, Chillcuts)
- Not Myself (2024, Chillcuts)

=== Compilation appearances ===
- Chill Out Lounge Vol. 2 (2001, Water Music Records)
- Chill Out in the City (2001, Water Music Records)
- Music Inspired by SWAT (2001, SWAT Productions)
- Excelsis 3: A Prelude (2001, Projekt Records)
- Excelsis Box Set (2001, Projekt Records)
- Mondisk: A Celebration of 13 Years (2002, Monitor Records)
- Cool Terrasse (2002, CH Musiq)
- Blisscent 1 (2002, Blisscent Records)
- Projekt: Gothic (2002, Projekt Records)
- Projekt 2002.2 (2002, Projekt Records)
- The Arbitrary Width of Shadows (2002, Projekt Records)
- A Dark Noel: The Very Best of Excelsis (2002, Projekt Records/Hot Topic)
- Projekt 2002.3 (2002, Projekt Records)
- Dark Horizons - A Decade of Darkness Dark Horizons (2003)
- Projekt 2003.1 (2003, Projekt Records)
- Precipice Vol. 2 (2004, Precipice Recordings)
- NPF Tribute Vol. 1: None Of Us Is Pink (2005, NPF)
- NPF Tribute Vol. 2: The Return of the Sons of Neptune (2006, NPF)
- Asian Variations: Various Artists Remixed by MoShang (2007, OnsePlate)
- Projekt200 (2007, Projekt Records)
- The Best of Sunday Sundown (2007, Intralog Sunday Media Network)
- The Chillcast With Anji Bee: 5 Years of Chillin (2011, Chillcuts)
- Ornamental (a Projekt Holiday Collection) (2012, Projekt Records)
- Out Of Phase: The hEADaCHE Remixes (2013, Uncoiled Loops)

=== Collaborations ===
- Claire Voyant "Bitterweet (LSD Mix)" Time Again: A Collection of Remixes (2000, Accession Records) and (2001, Metropolis Records)
- Chandeen "Tomorrow" Teenage Poetry (2008, Kalinkaland Records)
- Karmacoda, Anji Bee, and Beth Hirsch Love Will Turn Your Head Around - Single (2011, Sola Music) and Eternal (2011, Sola Music)
- Falling You "Blessed" Adore (2011, Magnatune)
- Karmacoda, Anji Bee, and Beth Hirsch "Love Will Turn Your Head Around (Lovespirals Remix)" Love Will Turn Your Head Around - The Remixes (2011, Sola Music), Endless: The Eternal Remixes (2013, Sola Music), and Love Me Leave Me by Anji Bee (2013, Chillcuts)
- Karmacoda "Naive" Love and Fate, Vol. 1 (2015, Sola Music)
- Falling You "World on Fire" Shine (2017, Projekt Records)
- Karmacoda "My Love (Lovespirals Remix)" Revealed (Intimate Remixes) (2019, Sola Music)
- Sam Rosenthal Lovespirals, and Forrest Fang "Starseed" Tim, Where Are You Now? (2020, Projekt Records)
- Sam Rosenthal, Lovespirals, Bryan Metcalf, and Martin Bowes "Psi Phi Love Means High Fidelity" Tim, Where Are You Now? (2020, Projekt Records)
- Alan Elettronico “This Ain't Love (Lovespirals Remix)” (2023, Projekt Records)
