= Ever =

Ever may refer to:

== Music ==
- Ever (Love Spirals Downwards album) (1996)
- Ever (IQ album) (1993)
- "Ever" (song), a 2010 song by Gackt
- "Ever", a song by Flipper from the album Album – Generic Flipper
- "Ever", a song by Diaura from the album Genesis
- "The Ever", a song by Red from the album Of Beauty and Rage

== Literature ==
- Ever (comics), a Marvel Comics character
- Ever, a book by Gail Carson Levine
- Ever (novella), a 2009 novella by Blake Butler

== People ==
- Casey Hatherly (born 19856) also known as Ever, Canadian climate activist
- Ita Ever (born 1931), Estonian film, radio, theater and television actress
- Valter Ever (1902–1981), Estonian track and field athlete
- Éver Alfaro (born 1982), Costa Rican professional footballer
- Ever Hugo Almeida (born 1948), former football goalkeeper and now is the national coach of Guatemala
- Ever Amarilla (born 1984), Paraguayan footballer
- Ever Anderson (born 2007), actress and model
- Ever Caballero (born 1982), Paraguayan footballer
- Ever Cantero (born 1985), Paraguayan footballer
- Ever Carradine (born 1974), American actress and the daughter of Robert Carradine
- Éver Guzmán (born 1988), Mexican football (soccer) player
- Ever Hernández (born 1958), retired football player from El Salvador
- Ever Magallanes (born 1965), former major league baseball player and all-star minor league player
- Ever Meulen (born 1946), Belgian illustrator and comic strip artist
- Ever Palacios (born 1969), Colombian football player
- Ever Salas (born 1983), Colombian Defender that plays for Carabobo FC of Venezuela

== Other uses ==
- European Association for Vision and Eye Research, an international scientific society
- Ever (artist), Argentine street artist
- Ever (restaurant), a restaurant in Chicago, Illinois
- Ever, Kentucky
- -ever, an English suffix added to interrogative words in forms like wherever
- KT Tech EVER, a South Korean mobile phone manufacturer or its brand
- EveR, a series of female androids developed by South Korean scientists

== See also ==
- Eber (Standard Hebrew: ʿÉver), a character in the Bible
