= Wormburner =

American indie rock band

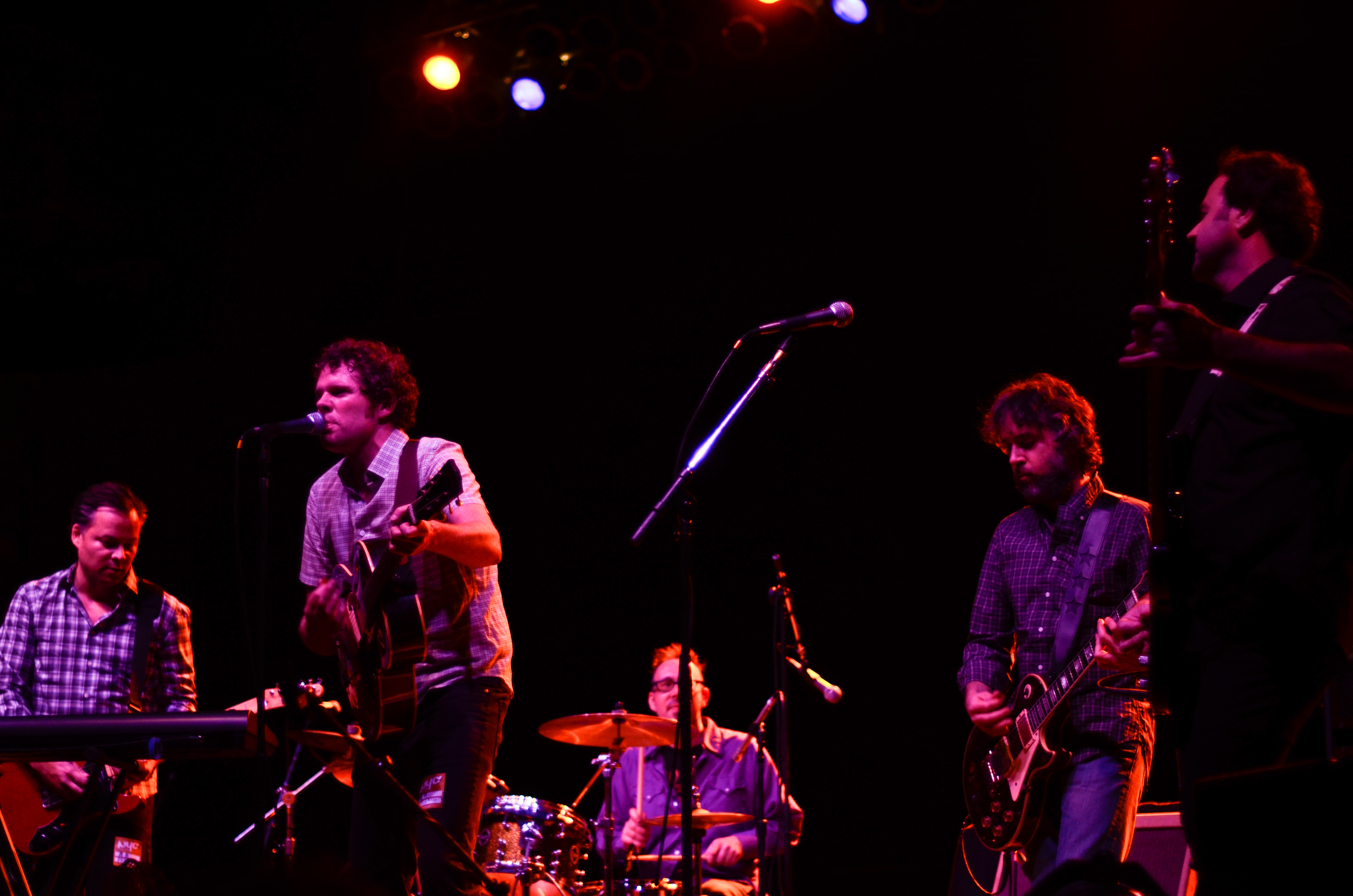
- Wormburner opening for Violent Femmes at Roseland Ballroom in New York City (November 14, 2013)

Background information
- Origin: Brooklyn, New York
- Genres: Indie rock
- Years active: 2003–present
- Labels: Dive Records, Wax Off
- Members: Steve "Hank" Henry; Alan J Camlet; Terry Solomone; Paul McDaniel; John Hastings; Nate Palan
- Past members: Alec Senese, Jim Spengler
- Website: http://www.wormburnerband.com/

Wormburner is an indie rock band based in Brooklyn, New York. Their music has been categorized as college rock. The band has six members, and is led by Steve "Hank" Henry, who is the band's singer, guitarist, and principal songwriter. Henry graduated from Colgate University. Their debut album, A Hero's Welcome, was released in 2006 and produced by David Lowery of Cracker. The band wrote and recorded the album's 12 songs at Lowery's studio in Richmond, Virginia. These songs' power-pop sound, along with a series of live shows by the band, led to the band and album becoming increasingly popular. The band released its second album, Placed by the Gideons, in 2010 on the label Wax Off, which is partly run by WSUM host DJ Renton. In 2012, the band was interviewed for MTV's series 120 Minutes. In November 2013, Wormburner opened for Violent Femmes at Roseland Ballroom in New York City. Their third album, Pleasant Living in Planned Communities, was released on Dive Records in September 2014. Prior to its release, a song from the album, "Somewhere Else to Be", was premiered by Brooklyn Magazine. Robert Christgau gave Pleasant Living in Planned Communities an A− grade, writing that on the album, "Hank Henry doesn't swallow a word as he shouts his tuneful tales into the void, and unlike Craig Finn [of the Hold Steady], he doesn't specialize in or even much notice the human dregs and heroes of the alt-rock scene."

In early 2025, the band announced the release of their fourth studio album, titled "Last of the Winter Light". The 11-song collection was mixed by Phil Palazzolo (Okkervil River, New Pornographers, Neko Case, Ted Leo + Pharmacists). The LP was released June 6th on DIVE Records. MAGNET Magazine said the album “offers more of the same sharp-witted, consistently tuneful fodder for the indie-rock imagination that fans have come to expect from the resilient Brooklyn sextet.”

== Discography ==
- A Hero's Welcome (Dive, 2006)
- Placed by the Gideons (Wax Off, 2010)
- Pleasant Living in Planned Communities (Dive, 2014)
- Last of the Winter Light (Dive, 2025)
