= Time Again (Claire Voyant album) =

Time Again: A Collection of Remixes

Remix album by Claire Voyant
- Released: 2000, 2001
- Genre: Trip hop, downtempo, electropop, futurepop, trance, drum and bass
- Length: 1:07:12
- Label: Accession Records, Metropolis Records

Claire Voyant chronology
Time and the Maiden (1998)	Time Again: A Collection of Remixes (2000)	Love Is Blind (2002)

Professional ratings
Review scores
Source	Rating
Allmusic	4.5/5 stars

Time Again is a collection of remixes of songs by Claire Voyant. It contains 12 remixes of 9 songs from their previous album, Time and the Maiden. The only album track not included in the new collection is Elysium, replaced by the non-album song, Serenade, which appeared on a now out-of-print compilation CD released in 1998 by Patrick Ogle's Precipice Records.

The album was originally released on April 28, 2000 on the German label, Accession Records. It was then picked up by American label, Metropolis Records, and re-released in January 2001.

The "LSD Mix" of "Bittersweet," though credited to Love Spirals Downwards, was technically created by Lovespirals in the band's early formative stage.

StarVox Magazine listed Time Again in their Top 10 Staff Favorites of 2001, in a "tie" with Lovespirals' Ecstatic EP:

As synthpop's rise led inexorably to its decline, some Gothic-Industrial artists have started looking toward other avenues of inspiration. On these releases, Lovespirals and Claire Voyant provide tasty illbient and triphop-influenced grooves and give us a harbinger of Goth's Next Big Thing.

The "Trancelite Mix" of Iolite appears on the soundtrack to the 2001 film Gypsy 83.

== Track listing ==
1. "Iolite" (Trancelite Mix by Francis A. Preve) – 5:54
2. "Eventide" (Riptide Mix by Front 242) – 4:35
3. "Majesty" (Mix by VNV Nation) – 5:45
4. "Mercy" (Mix by cut.rate.box) – 6:05
5. "Majesty" (Premonition Mix by Assemblage 23) – 6:48
6. "Love the Giver" (Mix by Eskil Simonsson of Covenant) – 5:27
7. "Iolite" (Mix by Octaine) – 3:50
8. "Time and the Maiden" (Mix by Luxt) – 4:52
9. "Blinking Tears" (Mix by Haujobb) – 4:59
10. "Bittersweet" (LSD Mix by Love Spirals Downwards) – 5:00
11. "Everafter" (Singing in the Rain mix by J. Stephen Foster) – 3:35
12. "Majesty" (Mix by Beborn Beton) – 5:35
13. "Serenade" (Mix by Trance to the Sun) – 4:41
