= Camp Randall Stadium =

Home stadium of the Wisconsin, Badgers. Madison, Wisconsin

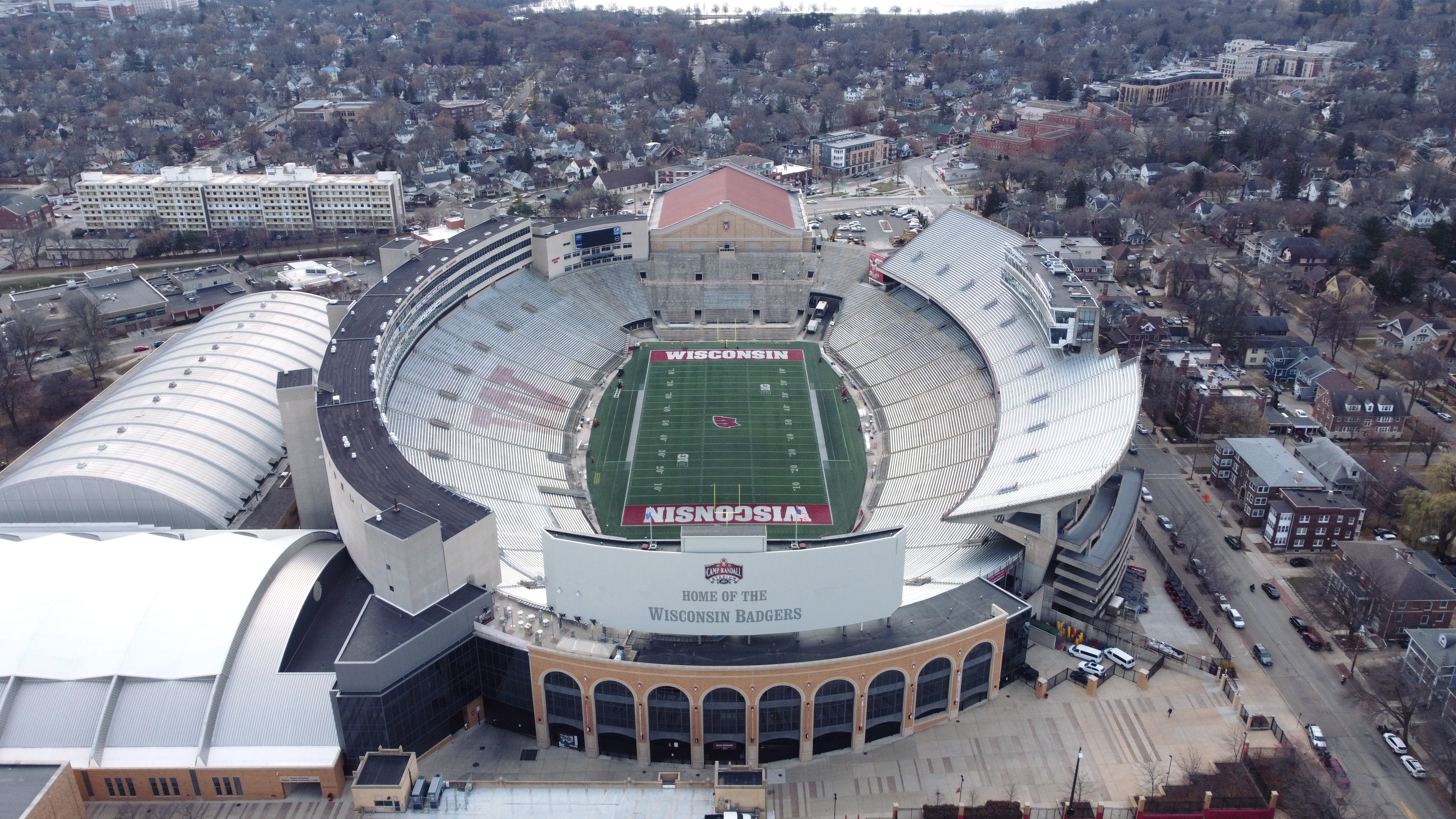
- Camp Randall Stadium in 2021
- Interactive map of Camp Randall Stadium
- Location: 1440 Monroe Street; University of Wisconsin; Madison, Wisconsin
- Coordinates: 43°4′12″N 89°24′46″W
- Owner: University of Wisconsin–Madison
- Operator: University of Wisconsin–Madison
- Capacity: 76,030 (2024–present) Former List: 76,118 (2023); 75,822 (2022); 80,321 (2005–2021); 82,123 (2004); 76,634 (2001–2003); 76,129 (1998–2000); 77,745 (1991–1997); 76,293 (1987–1990); 77,280 (1966–1986); 63,435 (1958–1965); 52,788 (1955–1957); 52,819 (1953–1954); 51,000 (1951–1952); 45,000 (1940–1950); 36,000 (1937–1939); 32,700 (1932–1936); 38,293 (1926–1931); 29,783 (1925); 20,000 (1921–1924); 11,900
- Surface: FieldTurf (2003–present); AstroTurf (1968–2002); Natural grass (1917–1967)
- Public transit: Metro Transit

Construction
- Groundbreaking: 1917
- Opened: November 3, 1917; 109 years ago
- Renovated: 2004, 2022 (south end zone)
- Expanded: 1921, 1924, 1940, 1951, 1958, 1966, 2004
- Cost: $15,000 ($376,948 in 2025 dollars)
- Architects: Arthur Peabody; Berners-Schober Associates, Inc. (2005 renovation)

Tenant
- Wisconsin Badgers (NCAA) (1917–present)

Website
- camprandallstadium.com

Camp Randall Stadium is an outdoor stadium in Madison, Wisconsin, located on the campus of the University of Wisconsin. It has been the home of the Wisconsin Badgers football team in rudimentary form since 1895, and as a fully functioning stadium since 1917. It is the oldest and seventh-largest stadium in the Big Ten Conference. The field has a conventional north–south alignment at an approximate elevation of 880 feet (270 m) above sea level.

== History ==
The stadium lies on the grounds of Camp Randall, a Union Army training camp during the Civil War. The camp was named after then Governor Alexander Randall, who later became Postmaster General of the United States.

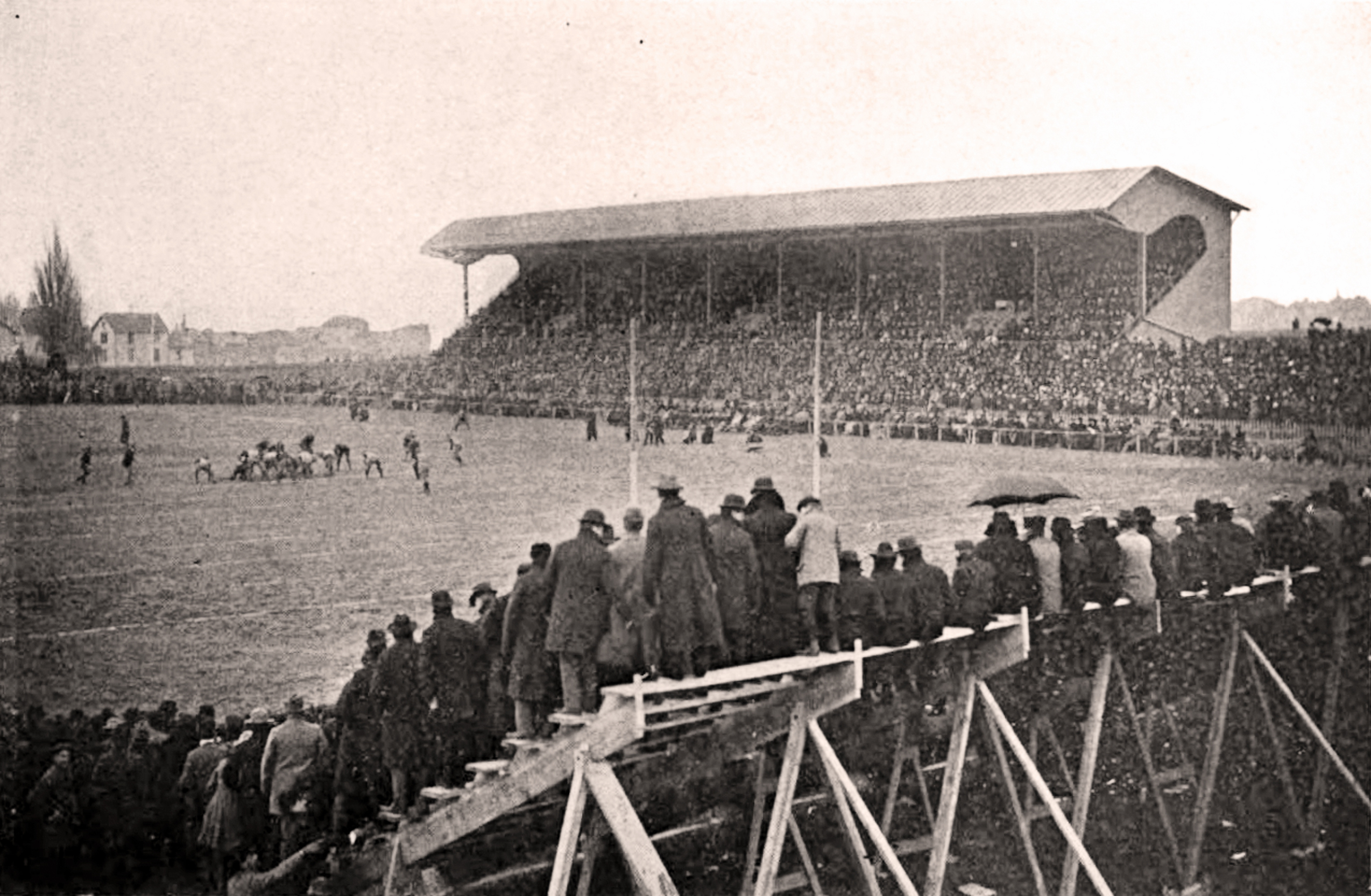
Randall Field prior to stadium construction

After an outcry from veterans over plans to turn the site into building lots, the state bought it in 1893 and presented it to the university. Soon afterward, it was pressed into service as an athletic ground. It was originally used by the track and field team before the football and baseball teams moved there in 1895. The wooden bleachers were very difficult to maintain, and some were condemned as unsafe in 1914. The university then asked for $40,000 to build a concrete-and-steel stadium, and got $20,000. After three sections of bleachers collapsed during a 1915 game, the state readily granted the additional money. The new stadium opened for the first time on October 6, 1917. It consisted of 7,500 concrete seats—roughly corresponding to the lower portion of the current stadium's east grandstand—and 3,000 wooden seats from the old field.

After the wooden seats burned down in 1922, more permanent seats were added in stages until it consisted of a horseshoe opening to the south, with a running track around the field. In 1940, the UW built an addition to the east side of Camp Randall that included housing for 150 people (as well as a rifle range and facilities for boxing and wrestling). In 1951, the university decided to turn the Stadium Dorm rooms into office space. The stadium was renovated at various points to raise the size of the horseshoe by nearly doubling the number of rows around the stadium in stages, placing south stands in front of the Wisconsin Field House (built in 1930), the removal of the track and addition of nearly 11,000 seats in 1958, the addition of the upper deck on the west side in 1966, and finally the 2005 addition of boxes along the eastern rim of the stadium.

Originally natural grass, the field was one of the first in the United States to convert to artificial turf in 1968. Superturf was installed in 1980, and a new AstroTurf field was installed in 1990, and replaced in 1998. A new type of artificial grass, infilled FieldTurf, was installed for the 2003 season, replaced after the spring term in time for the 2012 season.

The stadium also houses athletic offices of the university. In 2002, a large-scale reconstruction project commenced, which added luxury boxes, a five-story office building, and separate football program offices. In addition, concessions, restrooms and other infrastructure items were upgraded, the walkway around the field was removed, and new scoreboards were installed. The construction was completed prior to the start of the 2004 season. The football team continued to play at the stadium throughout the construction.

Also during this period of reconstruction at the stadium, changes were made to the visiting team locker room. Known as one of the best visiting team locker rooms in the Big Ten Conference, it was initially painted a bright pink, a color thought to affect the play of the visiting team (similar to Iowa's pale pink visiting locker room). The UW Athletic Dept. decided that the color may irritate the opposing team and had the room painted a pale shade of blue called "prison blue", named for the shade of paint used in Wisconsin Department of Corrections facility cells, which is intended to have a "calming effect." Since this change, the Badgers have had a 43–4 home record.

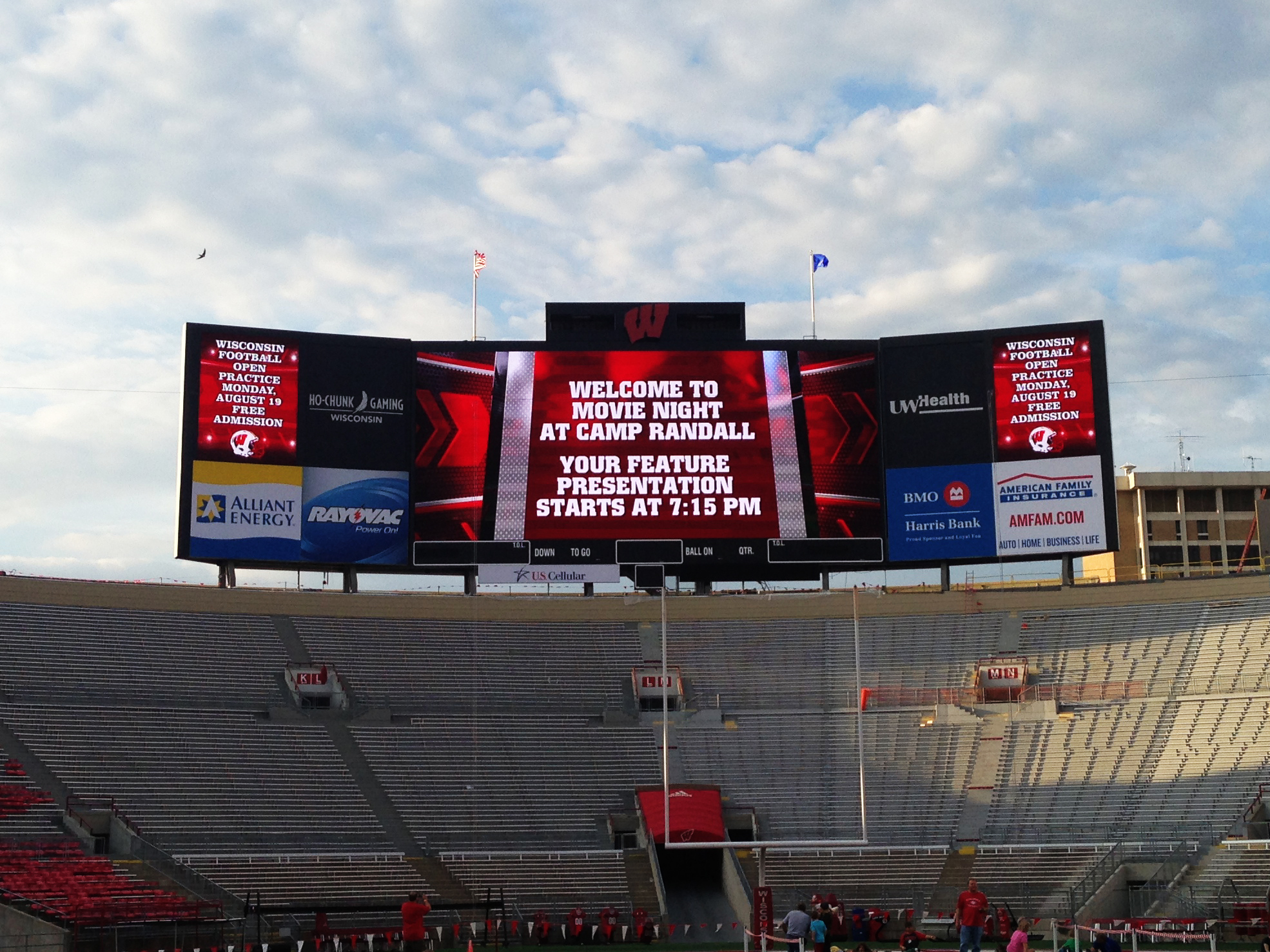
Camp Randall scoreboard at Movie Night 2013

The numbers of Wisconsin's two Heisman Trophy winners, Alan Ameche and Ron Dayne, are displayed on the upper deck façade. Both of their numbers (35 and 33, respectively) are retired; The retired numbers of Elroy Hirsch (40), Dave Schreiner (80), Allan Shafer (83), and Pat Richter (88) were added during the 2006 football season.

At Barry Alvarez's final game as head coach in 2005, plans were announced to place a statue of him in the Stadium's Kellner Plaza. The bronze statue was unveiled in 2006 on October 13. On November 17, it was joined by a similar statue of former UW athlete and athletic director Pat Richter.

Announced in the fall of 2010 and completed in January 2014, the Student Athlete Performance Center, an expansion of Camp Randall to the north, included a new scoreboard, academic and strength training facilities, multimedia instructional space, lower-level football team access tunnel, and renovated locker rooms, shower rooms and equipment space. The new scoreboard is 50 by 170 feet (15 by 52 m) and the Daktronics screen is 4,271 square feet (396.8 m^{2}) (per @BadgerFootball), with two smaller screens flanking either side.

In 2018, a plan was announced to build premium seating in the south end zone (replacing existing bleacher seating), replace the artificial turf, upgrade utilities, and improve the press box. These projects were completed over the summer of 2022, cutting the stadium's capacity from 80,321 down to its current number of 75,822. With the 2024 expansion of the Big Ten and its new television contract adding new evening games to the schedule deep into November, and the possibility of hosting College Football Playoff games, UW–Madison replaced the field after the 2023 season with a heated surface and winterization measures which will allow it to continue hosting games until the end of the year. The scoreboard will also have additional panels added on to replace traditional static advertising hoardings.

== Crush ==
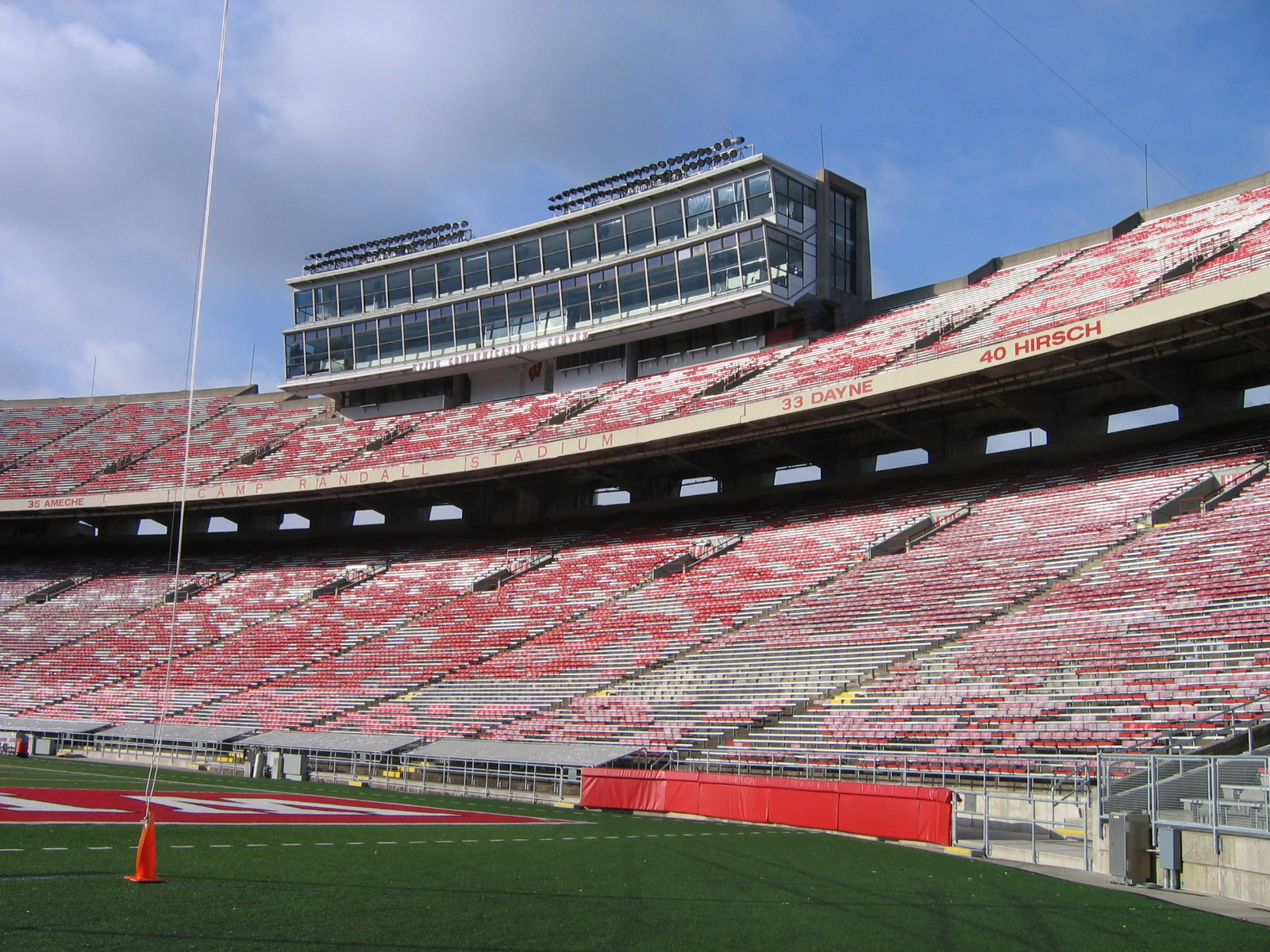
November 2006

On October 30, 1993, Wisconsin defeated the Michigan Wolverines, 13–10, for the first time since 1981. As the final gun sounded, students began to charge the field to celebrate, but were blocked by the guardrails surrounding the field. The crowd in the back, not aware of what was going on at the front, continued to move forward, aided by gravity. Those in front were crushed against the rails and then trampled when the rails finally gave way and the throng spilled onto the field. There were no fatalities, but 73 students were injured, six of them critically. Several Badgers football players assisted with removing the injured from the tangle. Per Mar Security (stadium security) and the University of Wisconsin were later found liable for this situation.

As a result, design changes were made in the stadium that increased the size and strength of the fences. Stadium personnel also received training to help them better handle a field rush. A field rush after a defeat of no. 1 Ohio State on October 16, 2010, showed that the measures taken after 1993 worked, as only one minor injury took place.

== Off-the-field traditions ==
Badger football events at Camp Randall Stadium include numerous traditions. Some of these include:

=== The Fifth Quarter ===
In 1969, the Badgers had lost 24 straight games, and Michael Leckrone took over the Wisconsin Marching Band. Working with athletic director Elroy Hirsch, Leckrone and the band created a fan event called "The Fifth Quarter" that took place at the end of the game. The Fifth Quarter was officially named in 1978, and its traditions have been passed down since then.

Songs typically played during the Fifth Quarter include "On Wisconsin", "You've Said It All" (also known as the "Bud" song, referring to its beginning as a jingle in a Budweiser beer commercial), "Space Badgers" (A variation on the opening to Also sprach Zarathustra), "Dance Little Bird" (The Chicken Dance), "Beer Barrel Polka", "Tequila", and "Hey Baby". Many spectators remain in the stands for 20 minutes after the game to enjoy the performance. Many of the songs are associated with specific choreography in which the band, cheerleaders, and the audience all participate.

At the end of the Fifth Quarter, the band lines up to play "Varsity" as the spectators sing. The band then exits the field via the north entrance to perform more and sing "It's Hard to Be Humble", after which the band marches to the Mosse Humanities Building, where it is dismissed.

Leckrone directed his final "Fifth Quarter" performance on November 24, 2018, after a 50-year career as director of the band.

=== "Jump Around" tradition ===
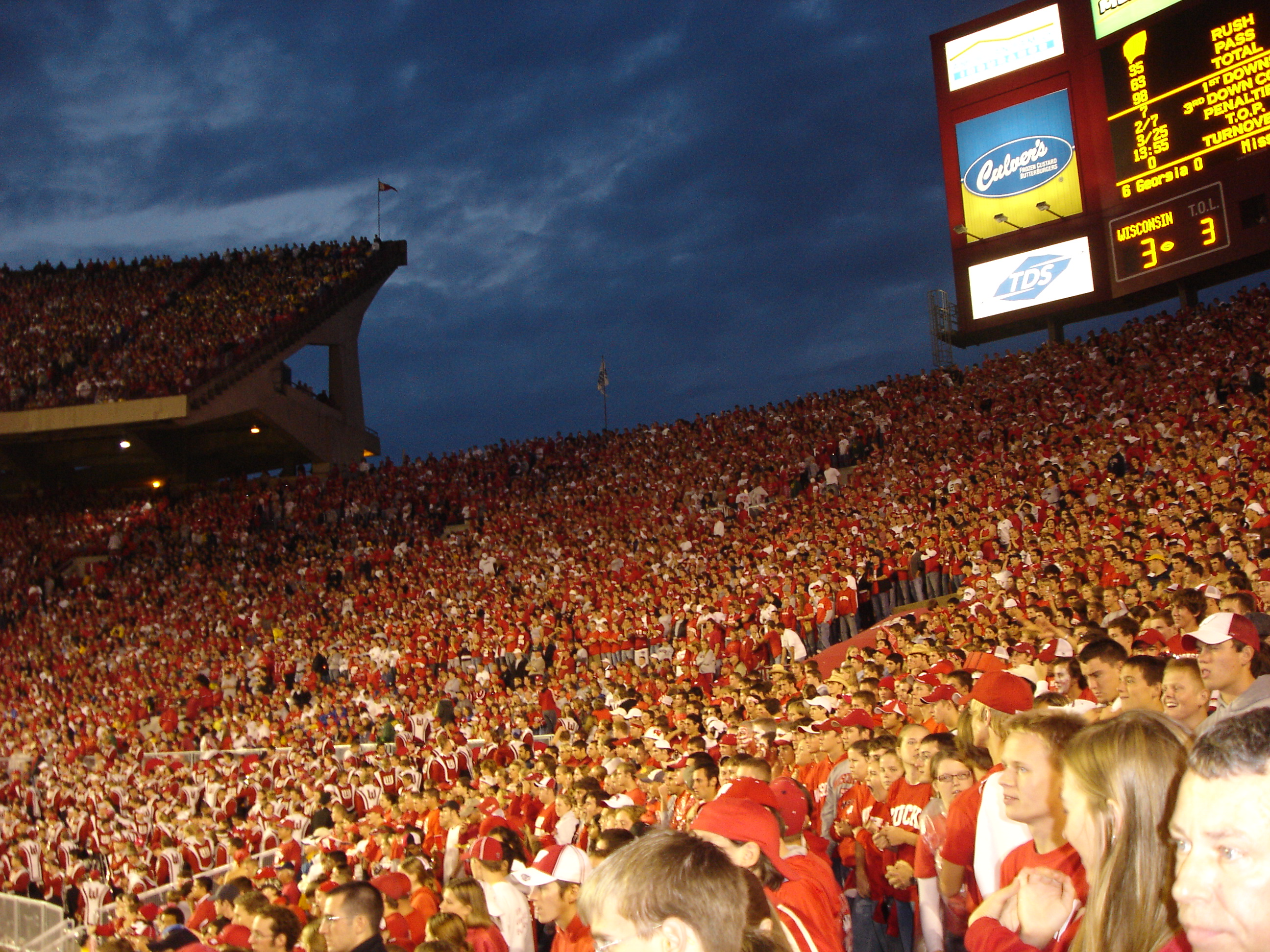
Badger fans fill the stadium during a 2005 football game with Michigan

Another tradition at UW football games is the "Jump Around", where fans dance to the House of Pain song of the same name. This takes place between the third and fourth quarters. The tradition began during the 1993 football season with the men's swim team smuggling in a megaphone and discman and playing the song to rile up sections O and P. The media start was on Saturday, October 10, 1998, at the Badgers' Homecoming game against the Purdue Boilermakers. After no offensive points were scored in the third quarter, the Badgers' marketing agent in charge of sound piped the song through the loudspeakers. It stirred up fans and players and has become a tradition of the last decade.

On September 6, 2003, (the Badgers' first home game of the season), with construction of the skyboxes surrounding the stadium, UW officials decided to cancel the "Jump Around" tradition that had been a staple for five years. Stadium security and the local police department had been informed of this decision, but no notification had been given to the fans. As the fourth quarter began and students realized there had been no "Jump Around", they became upset. Some jumped around without the requisite music. Then an entire section sat down in protest, a majority directed their middle finger at the sound booth, and a chant of "Fuck the sound guy" began. Sitting down was particularly significant as the student section generally stands on the bleachers while the team is playing. Chanting and booing continued through the majority of the fourth quarter. With 6:29 to go in the game, Lee Evans scored on a 99-yard play and led the Badgers to a victory.

When news surfaced on September 8, 2003, that this event was not a technical or human malfunction, but rather a decision by campus officials, the students launched a protest. Petitions circulated and students pushed back against administration. Structural engineers confirmed that the stadium could withstand the vibrations created by jumping. Two days later, Chancellor John D. Wiley announced that the "Jump Around" tradition would resume.

== Other uses ==
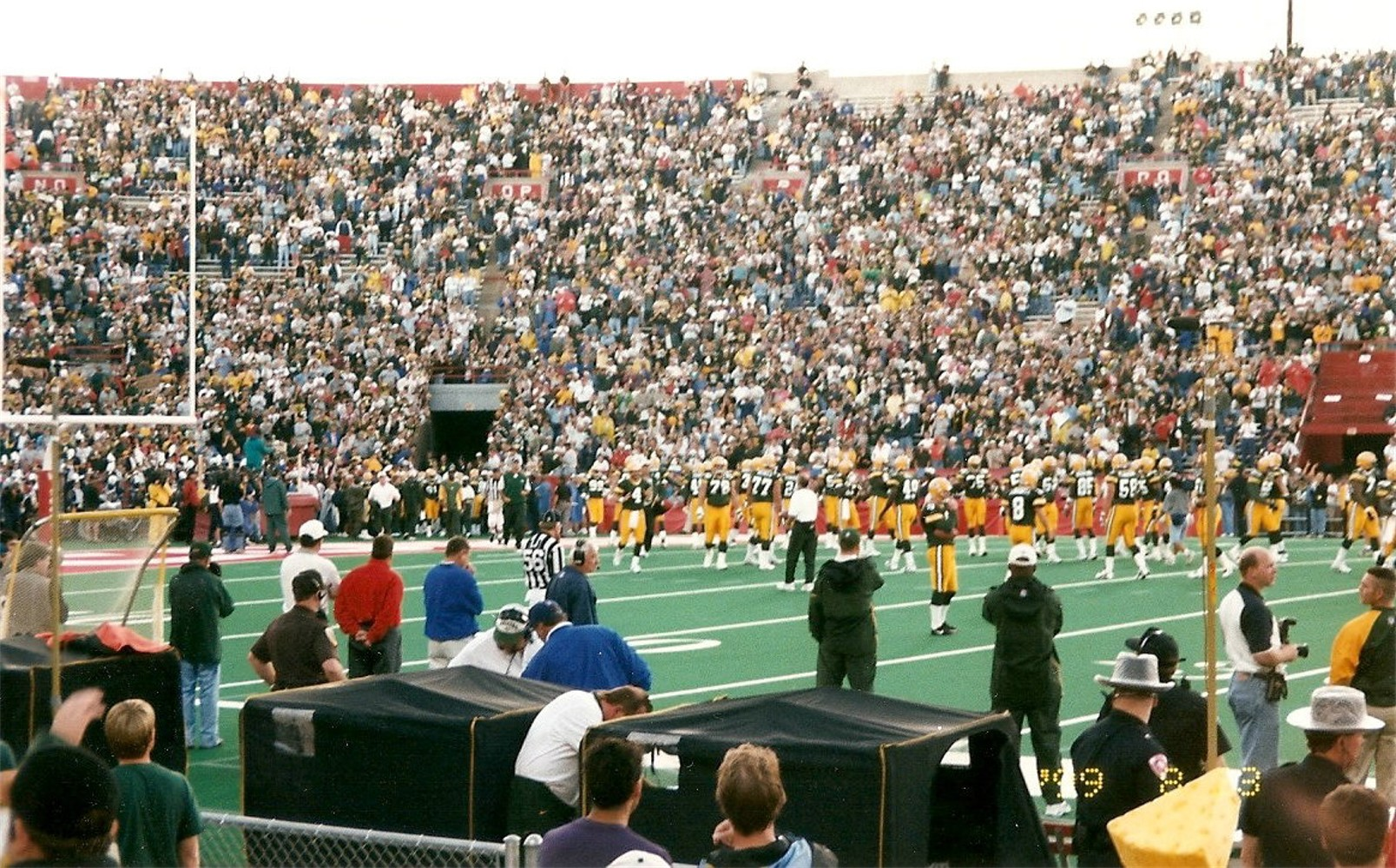
Packers host the Denver Broncos at Camp Randall on August 23, 1999

The stadium is also used by the Wisconsin Interscholastic Athletic Association for its state football championships.

=== NFL ===
The Green Bay Packers played twelve exhibition games at Camp Randall, which, up until 2013, had a larger seating capacity than the Packers' home stadium, Lambeau Field. The series began in 1986, shortly after the Chicago Bears began to use nearby University of Wisconsin-Platteville as a training camp site. The most recent pre-season Packers game at Camp Randall was played in 1999.

=== Hockey ===
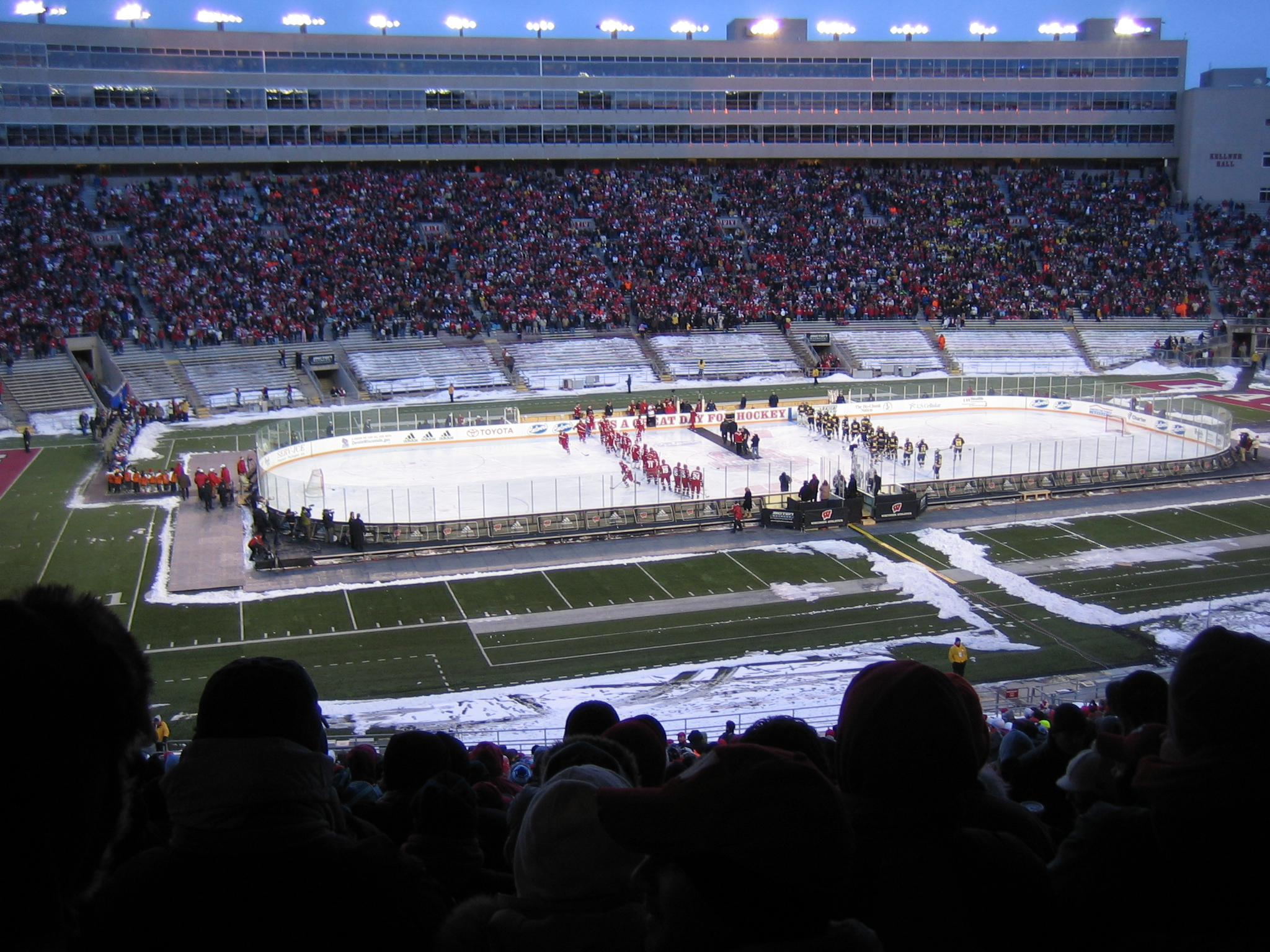
Men's ice hockey match

The University of Wisconsin men's and women's ice hockey teams each played an outdoor hockey game at Camp Randall Stadium on February 6, 2010, as part of the Culver's Camp Randall Hockey Classic. The Wisconsin women defeated Bemidji State 6–1, while the Badger men beat Michigan 3–2 in their matchup which served as the 2009 US Hockey Hall of Fame Game.

=== Entertainment ===
Camp Randall has also hosted a number of major concerts.

Date	Artist	Opening act(s)	Tour / Concert name	Attendance	Revenue	Notes
May 20, 1988	Pink Floyd	—	A Momentary Lapse of Reason Tour	45,132 / 55,000	$902,640	
June 9, 1992	Genesis	—	We Can't Dance Tour	—	—	
September 13, 1992	U2	Big Audio Dynamite II; Public Enemy	Zoo TV Tour	62,280 / 62,280	$1,868,400	
July 3, 1994	Pink Floyd	—	The Division Bell Tour	60,960 / 60,960	$1,942,780	
August 26, 1994	The Rolling Stones	Bryan Adams; Blind Melon; Lenny Kravitz	Voodoo Lounge Tour	51,201 / 51,201	$2,420,485	
June 25, 1997	U2	Fun Lovin' Criminals	PopMart Tour	34,002 / 40,000	$1,701,045	
October 6, 1997	The Rolling Stones	Blues Traveler	Bridges to Babylon Tour	27,087 / 35,000	$1,460,425	
June 28, 2025	Morgan Wallen	Miranda Lambert; Ella Langley	I'm The Problem Tour	—	—	
June 29, 2025	Morgan Wallen	Miranda Lambert; Ella Langley	I'm The Problem Tour	—	—	
July 19, 2025	Coldplay	Ayra Starr; Elyanna	Music of the Spheres World Tour	58,139 / 58,139	$7,536,623	
July 19, 2026	AC/DC	The Pretty Reckless	Power Up Tour	—	—	
May 26, 2027	Noah Kahan	—	The Last of the Bugs World Tour	—	—	
June 12, 2027	Metallica	Limp Bizkit; Avatar	M72 World Tour			

== Complex ==
The Camp Randall athletic complex includes three additional facilities: the Field House, home to the UW basketball teams until January 1998, and now the wrestling and women's volleyball teams; the Dave McClain Athletic Facility, an indoor football practice facility named for the late Badgers football coach, Dave McClain, which also houses locker rooms for football, men's and women's track, and soccer, and strength and conditioning, sports medicine, and academic services; and the Camp Randall Memorial Sports Center ("The Shell"), which contains a 200-meter indoor track that surrounds facilities for intramural sports. The indoor track is used by the UW track teams during their indoor seasons. The Shell also houses a practice ice sheet. The Shell was demolished in October 2024 to make way for a new indoor football practice facility.

== Longest home winning streaks ==
Rank	Started	Snapped	Streak
1st	October 31, 2009	October 27, 2012	21
2nd	September 9, 2006	October 4, 2008	16
3rd	October 29, 2016	September 15, 2018	12
4th	September 4, 2004	November 12, 2005	11
5th	September 6, 2014	October 3, 2015	10
T-6th	October 31, 1953	October 1, 1955	9
T-6th	November 18, 1961	October 26, 1963	9
T-8th	October 4, 1930	October 3, 1931	8
T-8th	September 12, 1998	September 25, 1999	8
T-8th	September 7, 2019	December 5, 2020	8

Note: Streaks do not include ties.

== Largest crowds ==
=== Top 10 largest crowds ===
Rank	Date	Attendance	Opponent	Result
1	November 12, 2005	83,184	Iowa	L, 10–20
2	November 6, 2004	83,069	Minnesota	W, 38–14
3	September 24, 2005	83,022	Michigan	W, 23–20
4	October 22, 2005	82,828	Purdue	W, 31–20
5	September 22, 2007	82,630	Iowa	W, 17–13
6	October 23, 2004	82,468	Northwestern	W, 24–12
7	November 10, 2007	82,352	Michigan	W, 37–21
8	October 1, 2005	82,330	Indiana	W, 41–24
9	October 2, 2004	82,306	Illinois	W, 24–7
10	September 25, 2004	82,179	Penn State	W, 16–3

== Gallery ==
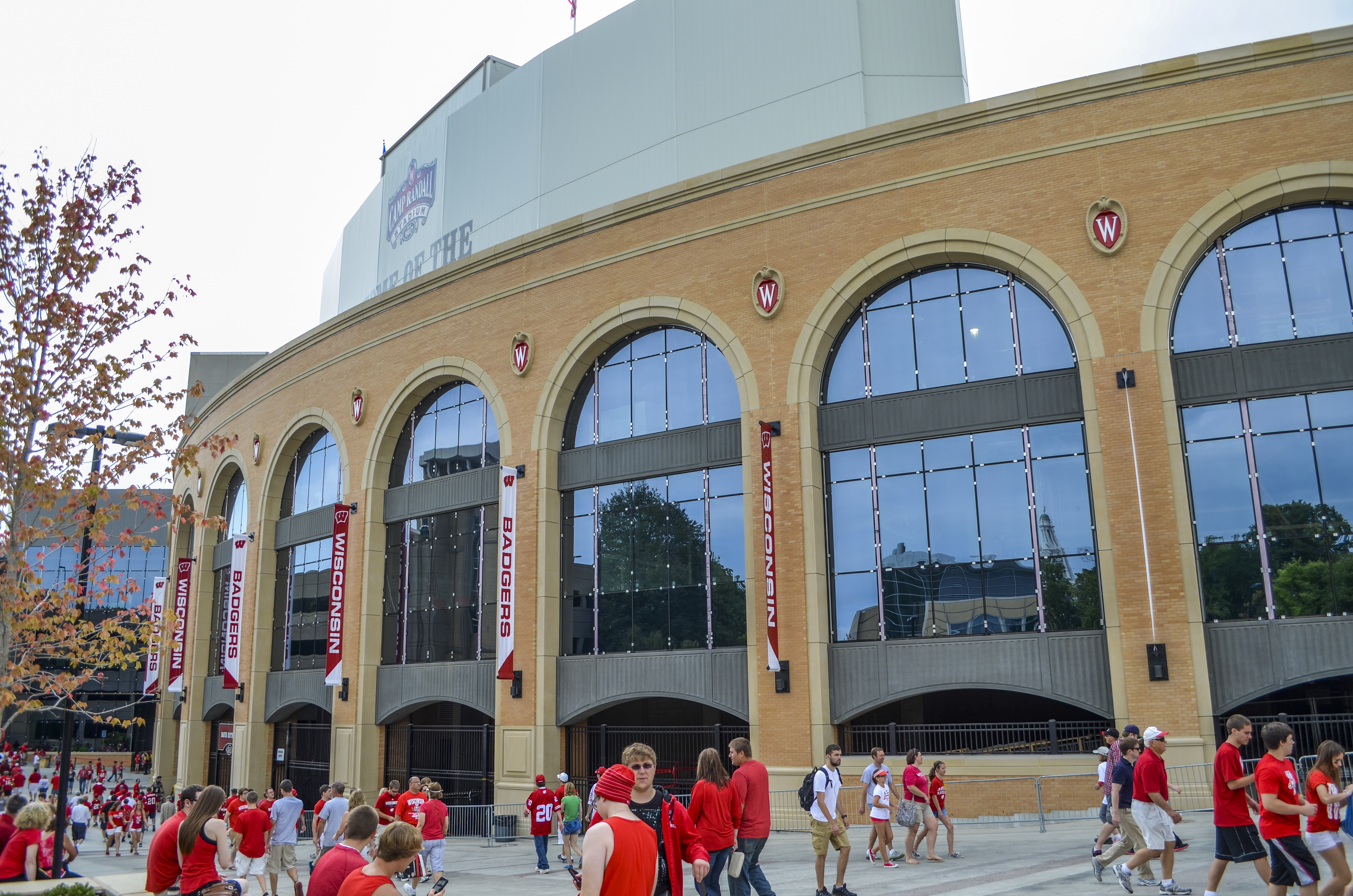

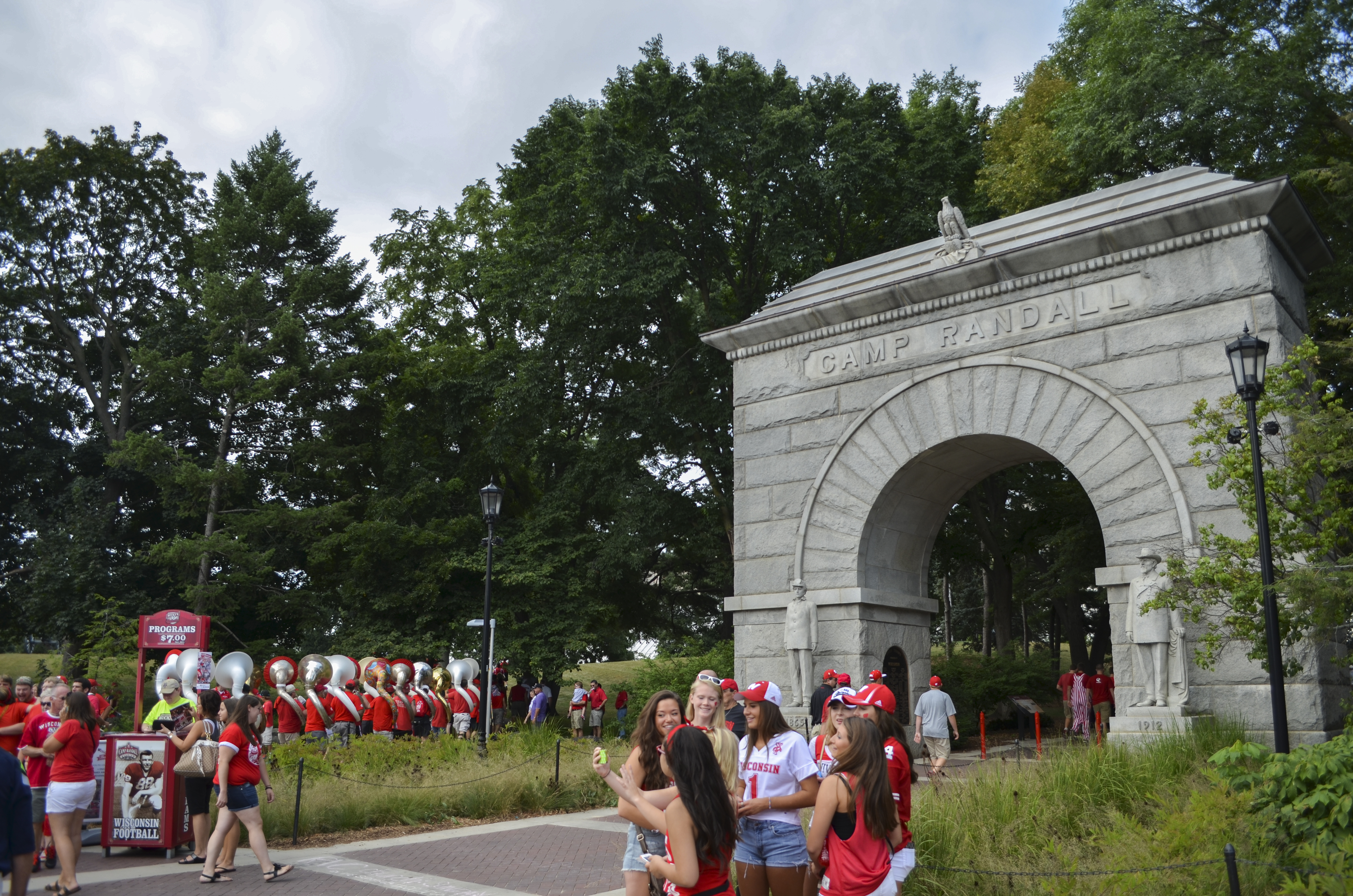

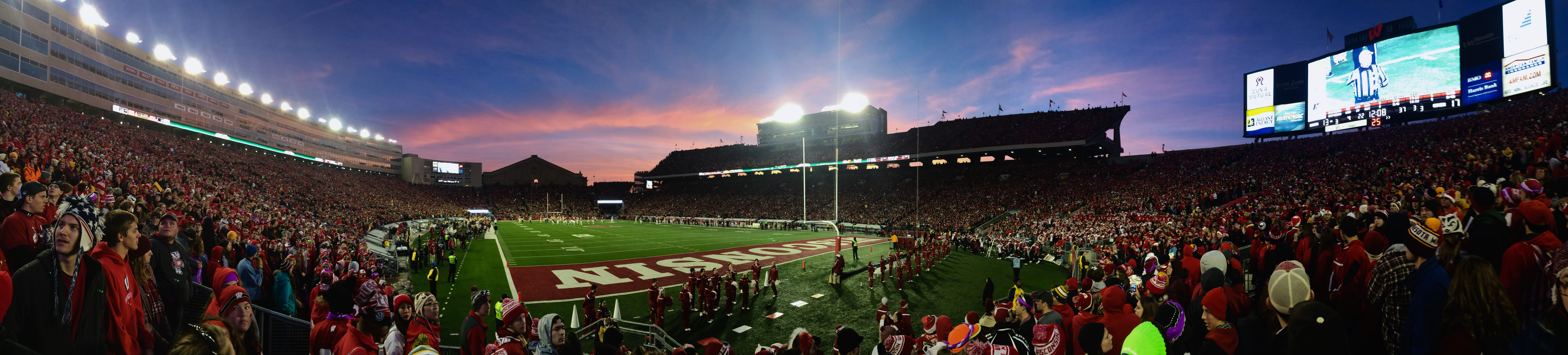

== See also ==
- List of NCAA Division I FBS football stadiums
- Lists of stadiums

Events and tenants
Preceded by wooden stadium on present site	Host of the Wisconsin Badgers; 1917 – present	Succeeded by current
Preceded by Grant Field; Cotton Bowl; Citrus Bowl; Ralph Wilson Stadium; Gillette Stadium	Host of the Drum Corps International; World Championships; 1985 – 1987; 1992; 1999; 2002; 2006	Succeeded by Arrowhead Stadium; Veterans Memorial Stadium; Byrd Stadium; Citrus Bowl; Rose Bowl
