= Time and the Maiden =

Studio album by Claire Voyant
- Released: November 16, 1998
- Genre: Darkwave, dream pop, trip hop, downtempo, ethereal wave
- Length: 55:15
- Label: Nocturne Records

Claire Voyant chronology
Claire Voyant (1995)	Time and the Maiden (1998)	Time Again: A Collection of Remixes (2000)

Professional ratings
Review scores
Source	Rating
Allmusic	link

Time and the Maiden is Claire Voyant's second album. All but one of the 10 original songs (Elysium) were remixed for Time Again, a collection of remixes.

== Track listing ==
The original 1998 release contained tracks 1–10. When the album was re-released in 2000, 3 additional bonus tracks were added.

1998 release
No.	Title	Length
1.	"Love the Giver"	5:16
2.	"Time and the Maiden"	4:56
3.	"Mercy"	5:07
4.	"Everafter"	4:50
5.	"Majesty"	5:18
6.	"Eventide"	5:49
7.	"Iolite"	6:05
8.	"Elysium"	6:02
9.	"Bittersweet"	4:31
10.	"Blinking Tears"	7:18
Total length:		55:15

Re-release 2000
No.	Title	Length
1.	"Love the Giver"	5:16
2.	"Time and the Maiden"	4:56
3.	"Mercy"	5:07
4.	"Everafter"	4:50
5.	"Majesty"	5:18
6.	"Eventide"	5:49
7.	"Iolite"	6:05
8.	"Elysium"	6:02
9.	"Bittersweet"	4:31
10.	"Blinking Tears"	7:18
11.	"Love the Giver (Low Mix)"	4:30
12.	"Bittersweet (Bitter Mix)"	4:27
13.	"Instinct"	5:16
Total length:		1:09:29

== Release history ==
Region	Date	Label	Format	Catalog
	1998	Nocturne Records		
	2000	Metropolis Records		MET 196
