= Love Is Blind (Claire Voyant album) =

Studio album by Claire Voyant
- Released: September 9, 2002
- Genre: Darkwave, dream pop, trip hop, downtempo
- Length: 52:14
- Label: Metropolis
- Producer: Claire Voyant

Claire Voyant chronology
Time Again (2000)	Love Is Blind (2002)	Lustre (2009)

Love Is Blind is the third studio album released by Claire Voyant.

Two tracks from the album, "Pieces" and "Twenty-Four Years", as well as "Iolite" from their album, Time Again, appear on the soundtrack to the film Gypsy 83.

== Track listing ==
All songs written by Claire Voyant.

1. "Pieces" – 4:34
2. "Twenty-Four Years" – 6:18
3. "Mirror" – 4:41
4. "Abyss" – 4:05
5. "Silence" – 4:59
6. "He Is Here" – 7:11
7. "Close to Me" – 4:49
8. "Warm" – 4:21
9. "Not Like Me" – 5:39
10. "Love Is Blind" – 5:32

== Personnel ==
=== The band ===
- Victoria Lloyd - Vocals and words
- Chris Ross - Keyboards and programming
- Benjamin Fargen - Guitars; ride cymbal on track 8

=== Additional musicians ===
- Ricky Carter - Tambourine on tracks 2 and 6; cymbals on tracks 3 and 4; drums on track 6; additional percussion on track 8
- Rich Kazanjian - Bass on track 6
- Jeanette Faith - Cello on track 10

=== Other credits ===
- Engineering and Production - Chris Ross
- Mastering - Steven Siebold
- Album artwork/design - Michael Swanson
- Management - Colin Gibbens/Luna Productions
