= Lustre (Claire Voyant album) =

Studio album by Claire Voyant
- Released: September 22, 2009
- Genre: Darkwave, dream pop, trip hop, downtempo
- Label: Metropolis
- Producer: Claire Voyant

Claire Voyant chronology
Love Is Blind (2002)	Lustre (2009)

Lustre is the fourth studio album released by dream pop band Claire Voyant.

== Track listing ==
1. "Lustre"
2. "Shine"
3. "Into Oblivion"
4. "Another Day (The Subtle Thief of Youth)"
5. "Mercurial"
6. "Painted Gold"
7. "Lost"
8. "Flicker"
9. "Broadcast"
10. "Washaway"
