= Love Spirals Downwards =

American band

- Also known as: Lovespirals Downwards (2024–present)
- Origin: Los Angeles, California, U.S.
- Genres: Dream pop, dark wave, ethereal wave, drum and bass, electronica
- Years active: 1989–1999, 2024–present
- Label: Projekt
- Spinoffs: Lovespirals
- Members: Ryan Lum; Anji Bee
- Past members: Kristen Perry; Suzanne Perry
- Website: lovespiralsdownwards.com

Love Spirals Downwards is an American, California-based band that incorporated themes from ethereal wave, dream pop, drum and bass and electronica.

== History ==
Love Spirals Downwards was begun in 1989 by multi-instrumentalist Ryan Lum. Lum initially worked with several different vocalists including Kristen Perry, who co-wrote a demo version of the song "Kykeon." Hearing these early cassette recordings while studying abroad in London, Kristen's sister and Lum's then-girlfriend Suzanne Perry decided she wanted to try out for the band when she returned to America. At that time Lum was pursuing a philosophy degree, while Perry was in a masters program for psychology. In January 1991 as Lum recounted, Perry “just started singing one night” while he was “jamming something that became the song “Forgo” and it sounded cool, so we carried it out and found out that we worked together nicely.”

In the summer of 1991 the duo of Lum and Perry sent a demo tape with their first three songs "Forgo," "Mediterannea," and "Dead Language" to 4AD, Creation Records, and indie label Projekt Records Pressed to come up with a band name for their demo tape, the duo found inspiration in a late night radio show, where the broadcaster exclaimed, “Love spirals upwards!” All Music Guide wrote about their 1992 debut, Idylls, "highly processed acoustic and electric guitars coalesc(e) gracefully around Suzanne Perry's angelic vox." Upon the advice of a friend, however, they changed "Upwards" to "Downwards" to better fit the band's genre as well as to avoid a connection to Louisiana State University. Brian Reeseman wrote in 1997’s All Music Guide review of Ever, "Another noticeable element is the diverse vocal display by Perry, who sings and coos dreamily through the album."

Over their eight-year history with Projekt Records, Love Spirals Downwards released four full-length albums, a career retrospective and a CD single, selling (by their own account) in excess of 40,000 albums. They were also included on over two dozen various artist compilations, including the Heavenly Voices series released by the German label Hyperium Records.

Kristen Perry returned to collaborate with Lum on two tracks for the 1998 album, Flux. One of her songs, "Psyche," was used on episode No. 501 of Dawson's Creek, originally airing on October 10, 2001. This episode was included on the Season 5 DVD set.

Jennifer Wilde (then working under her maiden name, Jennifer Ryan Fuller) performed as a guest vocalist and lyricist on two tracks for Love Spirals Downwards' 1994 second release, Ardor. Her vocals on one of these songs, "Sunset Bell," were reused for a new version of the song four years later on the band's final studio album, Flux. Wilde went on to form her own band, Liquid State, in January 2006 and is currently performing in the band Sword Tongue.

Although the band never officially broke up, in 1999, Lum began releasing music under the shortened moniker Lovespirals, featuring new vocal collaborator Anji Bee. In January 2000, career retrospective CD Temporal was released by Projekt, including new remixes of songs from Flux and promotional materials that seemed to indicate the band was still active.

Soon after Lovespirals released their 2002 debut album Windblown Kiss, Projekt announced that Perry would soon release an EP with a new band. Melodyguild began with drummer, Matt Gleason and bassist/guitarist, John West, both former members of LA band, The Von Trapps. West was later replaced by The Von Trapps bandleader, Rodney Rodriguez, who had contributed guitar to Love Spirals Downwards’ final studio album and live performances back in 1998. Perry’s band performed sporadically between November 2002 and January 2004 with the band membership changing several times. In 2004, Projekt's Holiday Single 2 limited edition CD featured a Melodyguild cover of “Sally’s Song” from The Nightmare Before Christmas soundtrack. The band’s first original song, “Panamint,” appeared on the Projekt 2007.1 compilation CD, and in June 2008, the long awaited Aitu ep was released via Projekt Records.

Since 2024 Lovespirals (Ryan Lum and Anji Bee) morphed into Love Spirals Downwards, continued releasing music under "Lovespirals Downwards" moniker.

== Members ==
=== Current lineup ===
- Ryan Lum – guitar, electronics, programming, synthesizer, sampler (1989–1999, 2024–present), bass (1998–1999)
- Anji Bee (Anji Lum) – vocals (2024–present)

=== Former members ===
- Kristen Perry (Kristen Perry-Gow) – vocals (1990, guest in 1998)
- Suzanne Perry – vocals (1991–1998)

=== Former session members ===
- Jennifer Ryan Fuller (Jennifer Wilde) – vocals (1993–1994)
- Rodney Rodriguez – nylon guitar (1998)

== Discography ==
=== Studio albums ===
- Idylls (1992, Projekt Records)
- Ardor (1994, Projekt Records)
- Ever (1996, Projekt Records)
- Flux (1998, Projekt Records)

=== Compilation albums ===
- Temporal (2000, Projekt Records)
- Live (2014, mp3.com)

=== Compilation appearances ===
- From Across This Gray Land No.3 (1992, Projekt Records)
- Hy! From Hypnotic to Hypersonic (1992, Hyperium Records)
- 50 Years of Sunshine (1993, Silent Records)
- Heavenly Voices (1993, Hyperium Records)
- Beneath The Icy Floe – A Projekt Sampler (1994, Projekt Records)
- Beneath the Icy Floe Vol. 2 (1994, Projekt Records)
- Zauber of Music Volume II (1994, Hyperium Records / Projekt Records)
- Of These Reminders (1995, Projekt Records)
- Beneath the Icy Floe Vol. 3 (1995, Projekt Records)
- Romantic Sound Sampler Vol. 2 (1995, Zillo / ECM Records)
- I Hear Ya! Spring 1995 (1995, Caroline Records)
- Excelsis (v.1): A Dark Noel (1995, Projekt Records)
- Wave Romantics: Dark Ballads & Underground Rock Classics (1996, Facedown / Edel)
- Beneath the Icy Floe Vol. 4 (1996, Projekt Records)
- Beneath the Icy Floe Vol. 5 (1997, Projekt Records)
- Splashed With Many a Speck (1997, Dewdrops Records)
- Life Is Too Short for Boring Music Vol. 11 (1997, EFM Records)
- Indie Gestion: AP 12 (1997, Alternative Press)
- The Projekt Sampler/Beneath the Icy Floe Vol. 6 (1998, Projekt Records)
- Carpe Noctem 1 (1998, Bleeding Edge Media)
- Romantic Sounds I & Dark Progressive Sounds (1998, Zillo)
- Loraine: A KUCI 88.9FM Benefit Compilation (1998, Peach Records)
- Precipice Recordings Volume 1 (1998, Precipice Records)
- Diva X Machina 3 (2000, COP International)
- Heartbeats (2000, Mascara/In-Zoom)
- Projekt 100: The Early Years, 1985 to 1995 (2000, Projekt Records)
- Darkwave: Music of the Shadows v2 (2000, K-Tel)
- Within This Infinite Ocean... (2001, Projekt Records/Borders Books)
- Excelsis Box Set (2001, Projekt Records)
- A Dark Noel: The Very Best of Excelsis (2002, Projekt Records / Hot Topic)
- Projekt: The New Face of Goth (2003, Projekt Records / Hot Topic)
- Samadhi Experience – Part 1 (2005, Samadhi Musik)
- Projekt 200 (2007, Projekt Records)
- Cherry Stars Collide: Dream Pop, Shoegaze & Ethereal Rock 1986-1995 (2023, Cherry Red Records)
- All Night Long in London (DJ Mix) by Avalon Emerson (2023)
- Infinite Sonore by Princess P. (2025, Mental Groove Records)
