= WSUM =

Student radio station at the University of Wisconsin–Madison

Coordinates: 42.904°N 89.556°W

- Madison, Wisconsin; United States
- Frequency: 91.7 MHz
- Branding: 91.7 FM WSUM

Programming
- Format: College radio and Variety

Ownership
- Owner: Board of Regents of the University of Wisconsin System

History
- Founded: 1996
- First air date: February 22, 2002
- Call sign meaning: Student radio for UW–Madison

Technical information
- Licensing authority: FCC
- Class: A
- ERP: 5,500 watts
- HAAT: 103 meters (338 ft)

Links
- Public license information: Public file; LMS
- Website: www.wsum.org

WSUM (91.7 FM) is a non-commercial radio station licensed to Madison, Wisconsin, United States, affiliated with the University of Wisconsin–Madison. It is a student-run station playing a variety of music styles with talk programming serving the campus and wider Madison community. The studios and offices are at 333 East Campus Mall on the 4th floor.

The transmitter is on County Highway A in Belleville, a community in Montrose, south of Madison.

== History ==
The University of Wisconsin-Madison was the founder of one of the earliest radio stations in America, WHA 970 AM. But that station has a professional staff and aims its programming at Madison and surrounding towns. The university wanted to have a college radio station to help students train for broadcasting careers and to serve the campus community. That station began in March 1952. Its call sign was WMHA and was later changed to WLHA. But it went off the air in 1993.

Dr. James Hoyt (former chair of the UW–Madison School of Journalism) and Dave Black, a graduate student studying journalism at the university, were asked to lead the effort to bring a student radio station back to UW-Madison. Dr. Hoyt’s involvement added long-term stability to the project.

An effort to reinstate the station began in the 1994-1995 academic year by a group of volunteers, including Stephen Thompson, who would later have a successful journalism career. This group submitted a budget and proposal to the UW–Madison administration, which was approved in July 1995.

The station was kept alive in the mid-1990s by the volunteers through events such as the 80s Flashback Dance, until the station signed on the air in 1997 as an internet-only service. In 2001, after an application was submitted by the station, the Federal Communications Commission (FCC) agreed to a radio tower being built in the town of Montrose in southern Dane County. The proposal was met with contention from local citizens of Montrose. But after a legal battle, the tower was constructed. Terrestrial broadcasting of WSUM began at 2:22 p.m. on February 22, 2002.

Since then, WSUM has expanded to 24/7 programming. The station currently has over 250 members.

== Programming ==
Programming on WSUM is entirely free-form. Hosts are allowed to completely program their own show. Programming schedules operate on a semesterly schedule. A typical schedule consists of a variety of sports, talk shows, and music shows, including indie rock, funk, house music, folk, and community affairs. Most of the programmers are students (of any area college), although there are some community members with shows.

On Wisconsin Radio is the station's flagship public affairs program. The show covers the Badgers and everything Wisconsin, featuring the latest in political news, sports, music, culture, and community events through quality journalism, creative pre-production and energetic live performance. Previous guests include politicians Senator Tammy Baldwin, Mary Burke, and Madison mayor Paul Soglin, comedians Julian McCullough, Christopher Titus, Steve Byrne, and Adam Cayton-Holland, and former Green Bay Packer Ahman Green. The podcast debuted in February 2015.

== Student Staff ==
Educating future broadcasters is one of the core objectives of WSUM, according to its mission statement. As such, the staff at WSUM operates as a professional radio station.

The station manager is elected each year in November by the members of WSUM, while the rest of the staff is hired by the station manager. The program director is in charge of scheduling shows and training future hosts each semester. The music director is in charge of talking to promoters and planning Snake on the Lake. The production director creates on-air fare for the station.

The general manager, currently Kelsey Brannen, oversees the student staff and liaises with the administration for budget and other issues.

== WSUM sports ==
The WSUM Sports Department provides UW-Madison students with hands-on experience in the field of sports broadcasting. WSUM Sports offers numerous sports talk shows throughout the week, all of which are entirely produced and hosted by students. In addition, WSUM provides live play-by-play coverage of Wisconsin football, men's and women's basketball, and men's and women's hockey on its online sports stream. The station also has an exclusive partnership with the official website of Wisconsin athletics, to broadcast Badger softball and women's hockey games.

In January 2010, the WSUM Sports Department began an exclusive partnership to provide the on-air talent for the Big Ten Network as a part of its "Student-U" initiative.

The WSUM online sports stream launched in October 2008, with a broadcast of the football game between the Wisconsin Badgers and the Ohio State Buckeyes. Coverage has since expanded to include men's and women's basketball, men's and women's hockey, and women's softball. In October, 2009, WSUM Sports traveled to Minneapolis to broadcast its first road game: Wisconsin vs. Minnesota football. WSUM has since covered every Wisconsin football road Big Ten game, select away men's basketball games, The Rose Bowl, The Big Ten Conference men's basketball tournament, Women's Hockey Frozen Four, WCHA Final Five, and The 2010 NCAA Division I Men's Ice Hockey Tournament.

== Party in the Park ==
Each year, WSUM puts together a free music festival that is funded through donations and fundraising events. The event was originally known as Party in the Park and was held in James Madison Park, near the UW–Madison Campus. The festival has drawn bands from around the country including The White Stripes, Andrew WK, …And You Will Know Us by the Trail of Dead.

== Snake on the Lake Fest ==
In 2007, the festival was moved to the Union Terrace and renamed the "Snake on the Lake Fest". Rock and roll band The Ponys headlined at the 2008 Snake on the Lake Fest, drawing a large crowd to the event. Ryan Leslie headlined the 2013 SOTL. Saint Pepsi headlined the 2014 event at The Sett in Union South. Burial Hex headlined the 2015 event.

In 2016, the Snake on the Lake Fest moved its location to a local venue in Madison, the Frequency with the band Whitney has the fest's headliner.

== Sources ==
- The tumultuous history and bright future of student radio at UW-Madison (Badger Herald, Feb. 21, 2002)
- Facility details for Facility ID 79040 (WSUM) in the FCC Licensing and Management System
- WSUM in Nielsen Audio's FM station database
