= Union South (Wisconsin) =

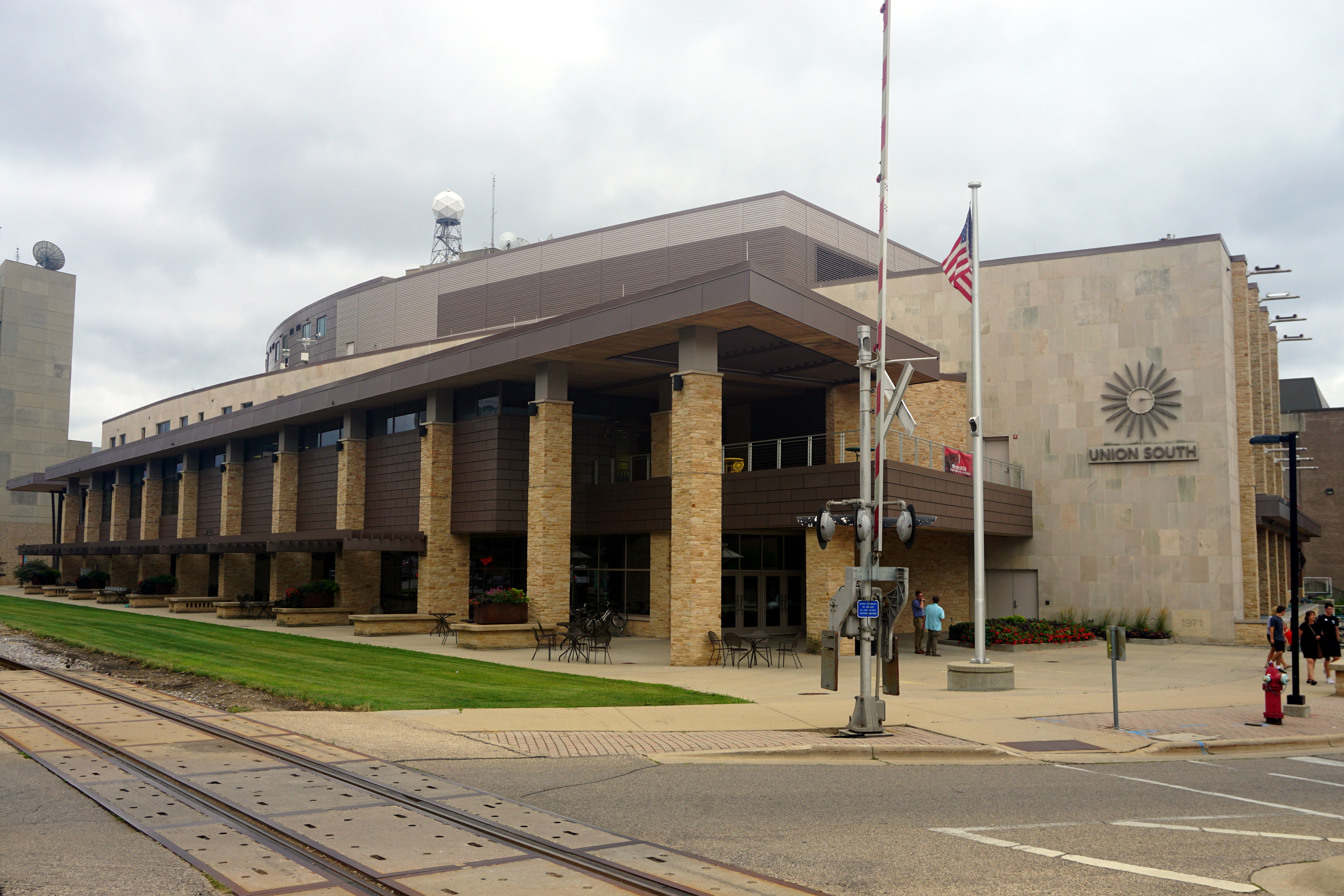
Union South

Union South is a student activity center located on the University of Wisconsin-Madison Campus. It was established in 1971. The first building was demolished in 2009 and a new facility opened on April 15, 2011.

== Facilities ==
The building features lounges, an outdoor terrace and pavilion with a fireplace, a rock climbing wall (now defunct), a bowling alley, and billiards, along with several dining options. It also features several on-campus arts venues, including the university's chief film venue, The Marquee, as well as The Sett for music performances and Gallery 1308 for visual art. The building has 60 guest rooms, 17 meeting rooms, a video conference room, a 180-spot underground parking garage (two stories below ground), and Varsity Hall.

Varsity Hall is a 10,778 sq. ft. multipurpose event space on the second level of Union South. Varsity Hall features hardwood flooring as well as natural light from both the west and south. The hall opens onto a lounge that overlooks the Union's south plaza and Camp Randall. Varsity Hall Lounge has a baby grand piano and opens onto the second-floor Badger Deck.

Every game day, Union South is host to the Badger Bash, a pre-game and post-game tailgate during Wisconsin Badgers football games. The bash includes a performance by the UW Marching Band before the game.
