= Ever Salas =

Colombian footballer (born 1983)

Personal information
- Date of birth: January 2, 1983 (age 43)
- Place of birth: Barranquilla, Colombia
- Position: Defender

Senior career*
Years	Team	Apps	(Gls)
2002–2007	Atlético Junior		
2008	Alianza Petrolera		
2010	Carabobo FC		
- * Club domestic league appearances and goals as of 22:06, 21 March 2010 (UTC)

Ever Salas (born January 2, 1983) is a retired Colombian defender.
