= Claire Voyant (album) =

Studio album by Claire Voyant
- Released: October 13, 1995
- Genre: Darkwave, dream pop, downtempo, ethereal wave
- Length: 48:42
- Label: Nocturne Records

Claire Voyant chronology
Claire Voyant (1995)	Time and the Maiden (1998)

The eponymous debut album of Claire Voyant was first released in 1995. In 1997 it was reissued on the German label Hyperium Records, and was re-released once more in 2000 under Accession Records.

Each release of the album features very different artwork.

== Track listing ==
1. "Heaven Knows" – 5:01
2. "Her" – 6:09
3. "Deep" – 5:02
4. "Someday" – 6:35
5. "Aqua" – 4:08
6. "Wanderlust" – 6:23
7. "Land and Sea" – 6:18
8. "Morning Comes" – 3:25
9. "Fear" – 5:37

== Release history ==
Region	Date	Label	Format	Catalog
	1995	Nocturne Records		NRLCD-1
Germany	1997	Hyperium Records		39101892
Germany	24 November 2000	Accession Records		A 023
