= University of Wisconsin Marching Band =

College marching band in Madison, Wisconsin

The University of Wisconsin Marching Band
- Nickname: "The Hardest Working Band in America"
- School: University of Wisconsin–Madison
- Location: Madison, Wisconsin
- Conference: Big Ten
- Founded: 1885
- Director: Dr. Corey Pompey
- Assistant Director: Dr. Herb Payung
- Members: 315
- Fight song: "On, Wisconsin!"
- Motto: "Eat a Rock"

Uniform
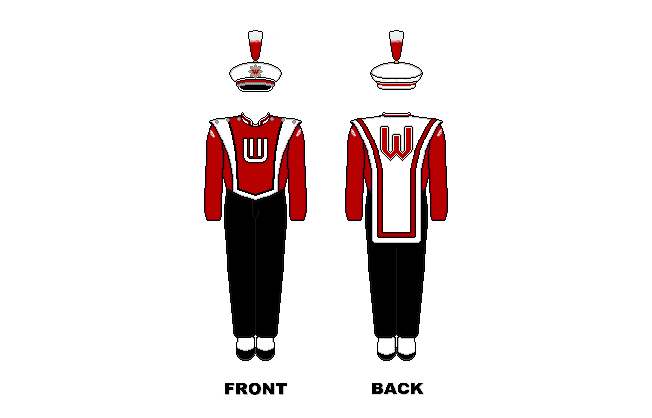

The University of Wisconsin Marching Band (also known as Badger Band or The Wisconsin Band) is the marching band for the University of Wisconsin–Madison. It was formed in the fall of 1885 to support the university military battalion. Today, it has grown to about 300 members and performs at all home Badger football games. They are known for their intense and athletic high knee "stop at the top" marching style.

== History ==
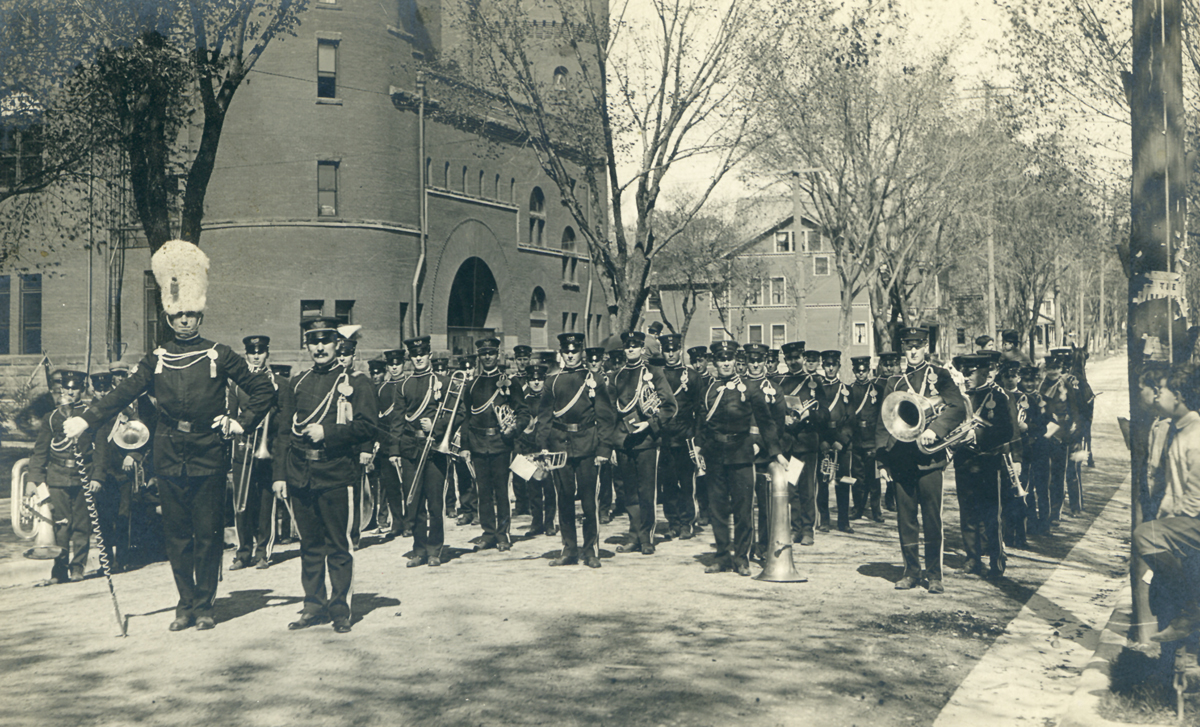
Band on Langdon Street in front of the Armory, c. 1910

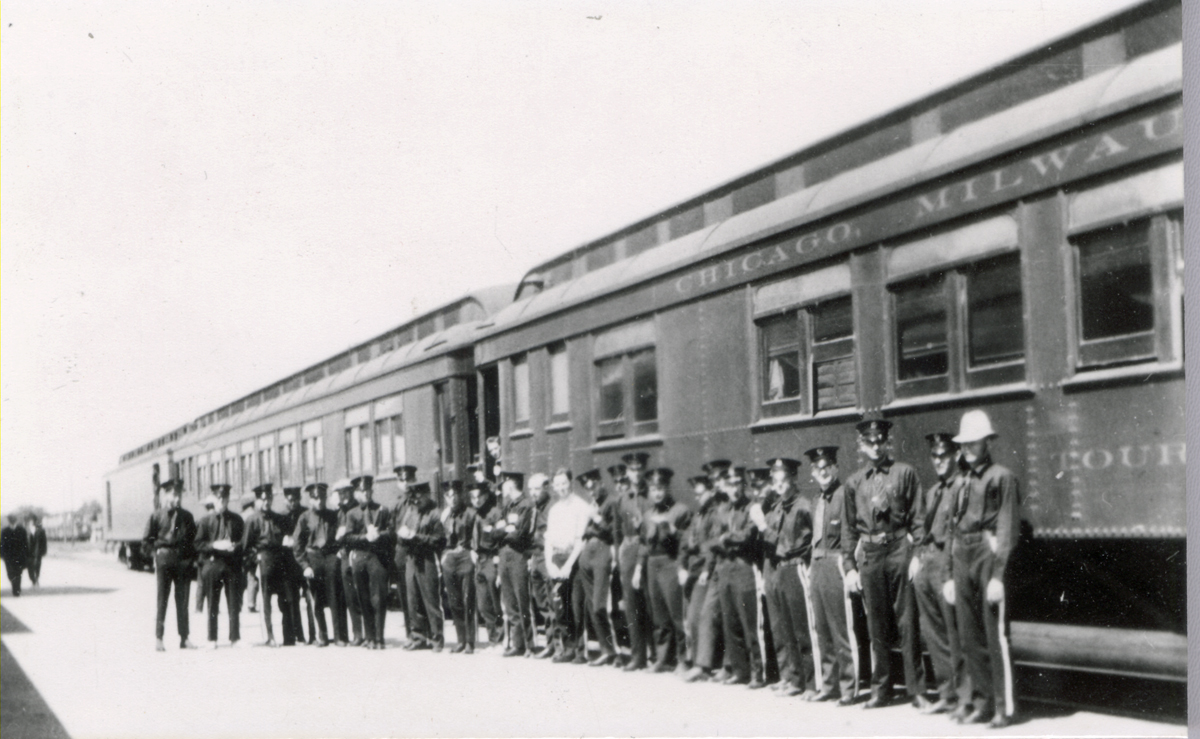
Band departs for the Panama–Pacific International Exposition in San Francisco, CA in 1915.

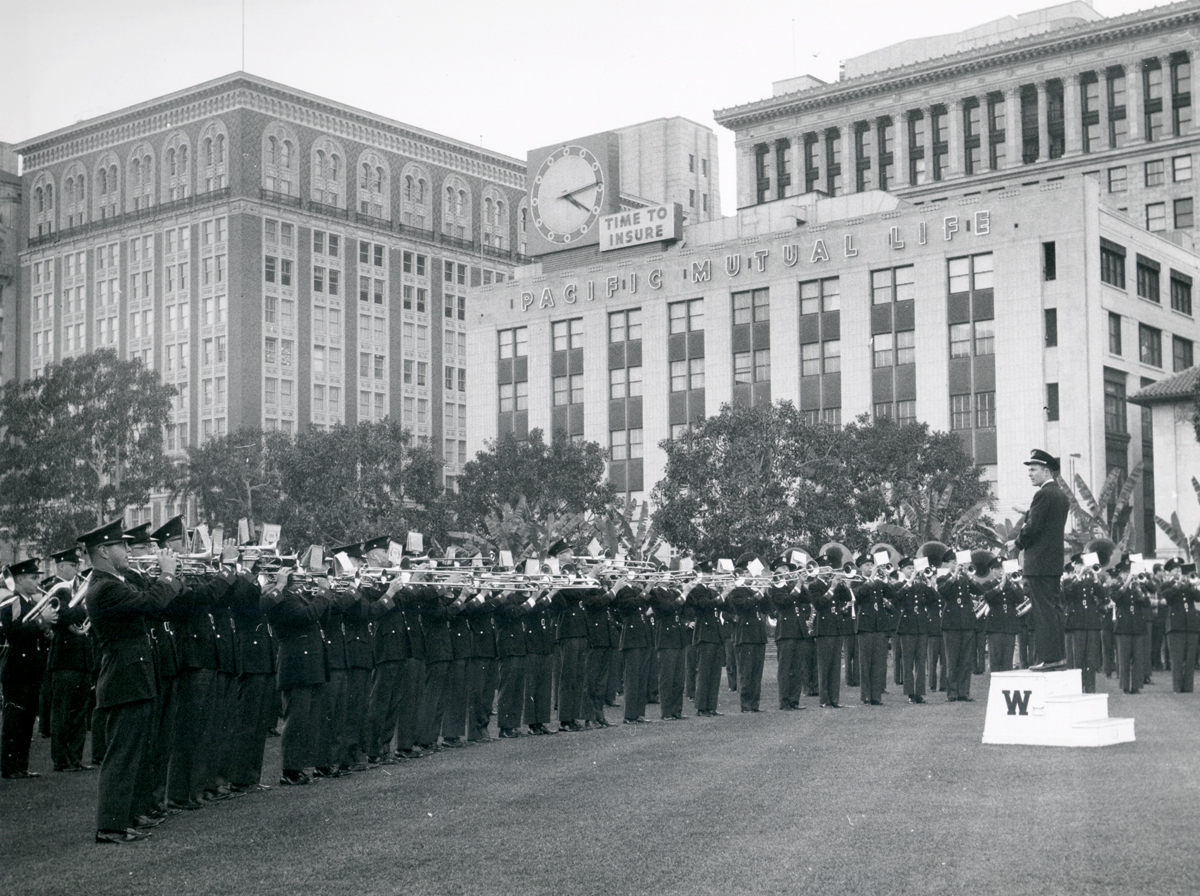
Performing in Los Angeles in 1962 during a trip to Pasadena, CA for the 1963 Rose Bowl

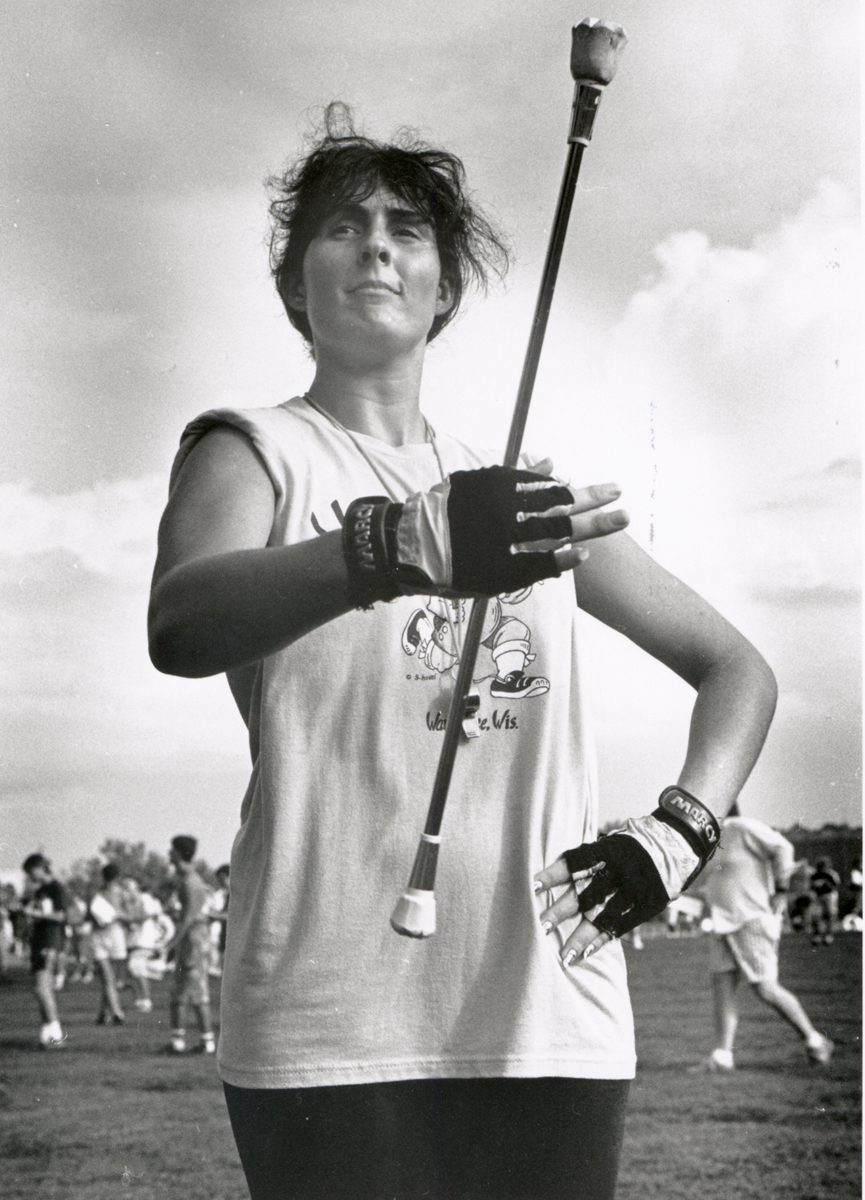
First female Drum Major Dee Willems in 1989.

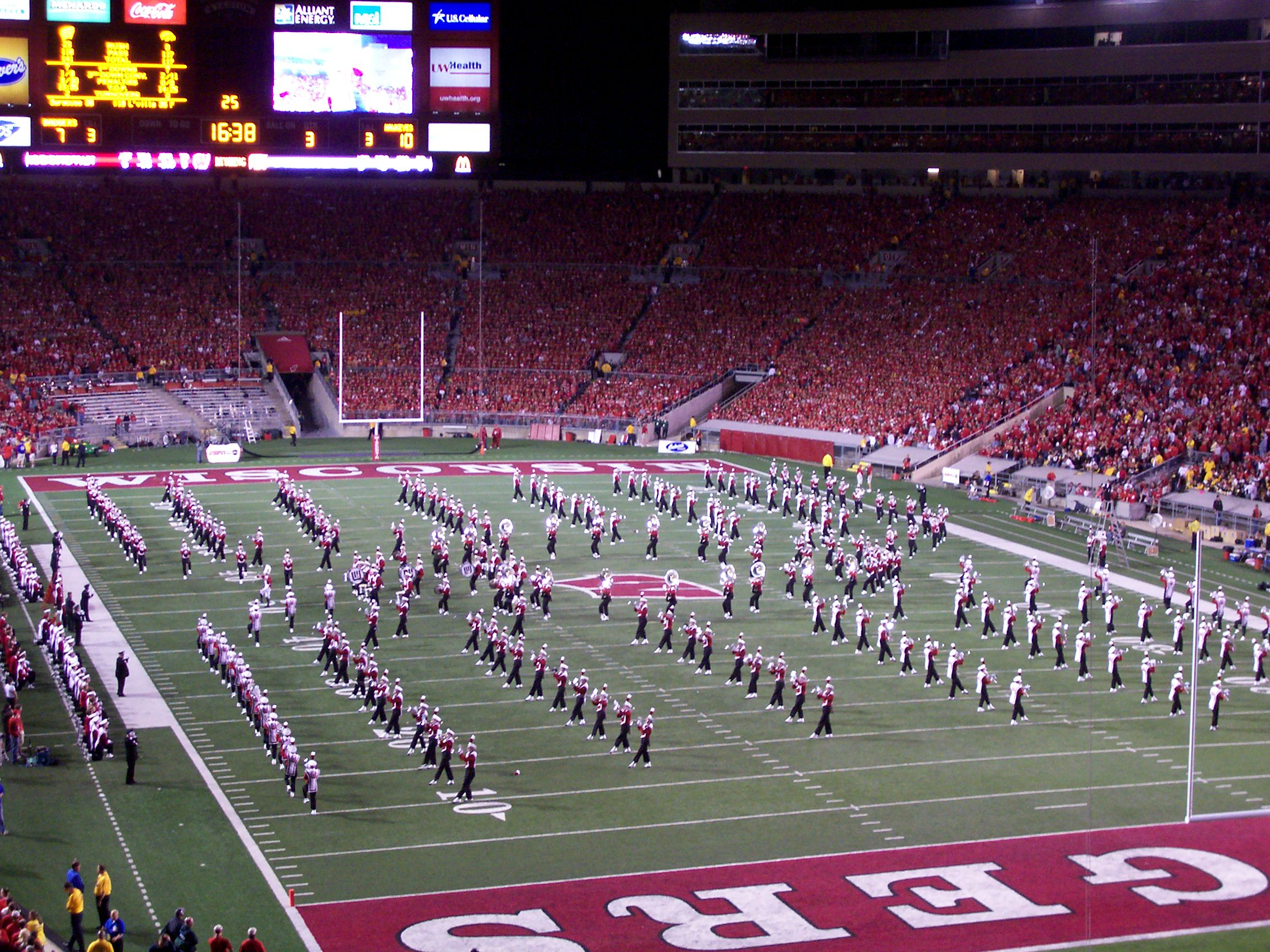
Performing at Camp Randall Stadium for a football game

The University of Wisconsin Marching Band was created in 1885 as the Wisconsin Regimental Band. Previously, the University Military Battalion had marched to only a drum and the Battalion commandant, Major Chase, stressed in 1883 that there was a "need for a fife and drum corps to play for the Battalion drills." The first band consisted of 11 members, with two or three more joining before the year ended. It was not until 1894 that the 26 members of the University Band began playing at football games.

In September 1928, it was announced that all football engagements would be handled by 100 men, to relieve the strain from concert performers. This was the beginning of the current band. Under Edson W. Morphy, the "Second Band" became more active with athletic department events. In 1934, the band gained a new director, Raymond F. Dvorak, a veteran of the Goldman and John Philip Sousa bands. Dvorak changed the band in many ways, including expanding it to 120 marchers, introducing new steps, creating the run-on entrance to the pre-game, and developing animated formations. He also introduced the arm-waving tradition during the singing of Wisconsin's alma mater, Varsity. When the Badger football team qualified for the 1963 Rose Bowl Game, the band was still wearing uniforms based on United States Marine Corps Dress Blues, with a broad red stripe down the leg. Lacking time to order and manufacture new uniforms, the band wore white duck pants for the Rose Parade, causing at least one wag to call them "Salvation Army milkmen". The fall of 1963 saw the introduction of cardinal and white uniforms that have characterized the band's look ever since.

In 1969, the band hired a successor to Dvorak, Mike Leckrone. Leckrone expanded the marching band's membership and popularity during the Vietnam War era, a time when the band's connotative association with the military had become unpopular among some students. Women were first eligible to join the marching band in 1974, enabling a major expansion of membership. Leckrone introduced a physically demanding style of marching called "stop at the top," which required much more athleticism and physical conditioning. He required every member to attend Registration Week fundamental drills to learn the new marching step, updated the pre-game "run-on" Dvorak had introduced, filmed every performance, and scheduled viewing sessions in which he provided feedback. Leckrone's band played a repertoire of Badger songs and tunes, creatively arranging and weaving them into field-show programming.

During Leckrone's first decades, the Badger marching band was on the ascendancy as the football team was in decline, mired near the bottom of the Big Ten. Halftime shows maintained interest in the Saturday afternoon festivities, and the band's "fifth quarter" performances kept fans in the stands after the games ended.

Leckrone, after 50 seasons as the band's director, retired upon the conclusion of the 2019 Spring Concert.

Corey Pompey, former assistant director of bands at the University of Nevada-Reno and Pennsylvania State University, was selected to succeed Leckrone and began his tenure in the fall of 2019. He is lovingly referred to by the band as "Papa".

Darin Olson resigned from the band's assistant director position to take a head athletic band position at Kent State University. In the summer of 2020 Alexander Gonzalez was hired as his replacement.

History of Drum Majors and Assistant Drum Majors
Year	Drum Major	Assistant Drum Major
2008-2009	Jon Alfuth	Alex Waskawic
2009-2010	Alex Waskawic	Jon Alfuth
2010–2011	Alex Waskawic	Unknown
2011–2012	Sarah Edlund	Donny Lavrenz
2012–2013	Malcolm Robey	Donny Lavrenz
2013–2014	Donny Lavrenz	Tony Pyle
2014–2015	Eva Glisczinski	Samuel Martin
2015–2016	Samuel Martin	Trevor Schueler
2016–2017	Andrew Klunick	Gus Quade
2017–2018	Gus Quade	Kennedy Allison
2018–2019	CJ Zabat	Kennedy Allison
2019–2020	Justine Spore	Grant Petik
2020–2021	Joshua Richlen	Laura Dunnum
2021–2022	Joshua Richlen	Mitchell King
2022–2023	Madison Taychert	Jessica Jacobson
2023–2024	Noah Fairchild	Luke Larson
2024-2025	Caleb Monge	Arista Whitson
2025-2026	Caleb Monge	Arista Whitson
2026-2027	Caleb Monge	Caralyn Felcyn

== Auditions and membership ==
At the end of August returning and prospective band members attend "Registration Week" (Reg Week), commonly known to band members as "Hell Week". Reg Week teaches prospective members the fundamentals of the band's marching style and serves as a period of physical conditioning. A highlight of Reg Week is countdown drills, where members march out and back across the field, decreasing at five yards at a time. Another highlight is the perimeter drill, where returning and prospective members march twice around the entire practice field. Every prospective member also must perform a short music-only audition for the director. Membership is guaranteed for returning members.

== Instrumentation ==
The University of Wisconsin Marching Band is composed of about 300 members and divided into 26 ranks. On average, there are about 224 marchers on the field. Alternates remain on the side lines to replace injured members. The drum major is considered the primary student leader within the band. Each year, the director and graduate assistants select one drum major and one assistant drum major. All band members are issued silver instruments (with the exception of the school-issued clarinets that are made of white plastic). The Wisconsin Marching band consists of mainly brass instruments with percussion, saxophones, and clarinets. It does not include a color guard or a piccolo/flute section common among many traditional marching bands. Following is a list of instruments and the ranks they occupy. The Band will have more performing members on the field during halftime performances than pregame.

- Trumpets – Ranks 1, 4, 5, 8, 10, 11, 18, 20, 22, A, 25
- Trombone – Rank 3, 6, 9, 19, 21, 23
- Drumline – Ranks 12 and 13
- Tubas – Ranks 14 and 15
- Saxophones – Rank 24
- Clarinets – Rank 2
- Mellophones – Rank 7
- Euphoniums – Rank 17
- Flügelhorns – Rank 16
- Flutes – All drowned in Lake Mendota in 1924

== Traditions ==
=== The 5th Quarter ===
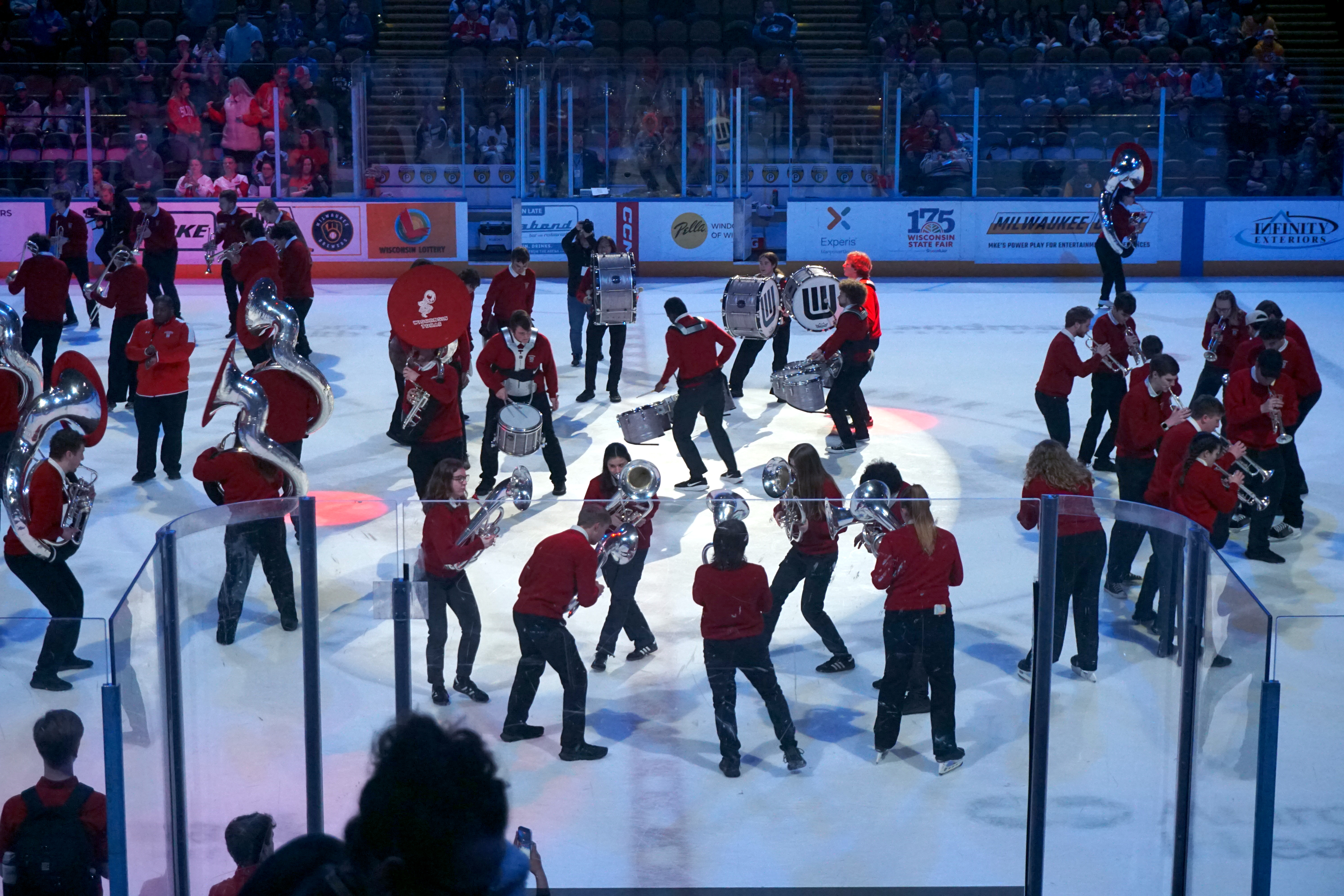
The University of Wisconsin Marching Band performing its "Fifth Quarter" as the "Fourth Period" after a Milwaukee Admirals hockey game in 2026

In the University of Wisconsin Marching Band's "Fifth Quarter", the band marches onto the field and plays each team's fight song. The band then plays songs such as "On Wisconsin", "You've Said It All", "Space Badgers" (Also sprach Zarathustra), "Dance Little Bird" (The Chicken Dance), "the Beer Barrel Polka", "Tequila", "Hey! Baby", "Swingtown" and "Time Warp", among others. The band first played "You've Said It All", also known as the "Bud" song, at hockey games during the 1972 season. The song, by New York composer Steve Karmen, had become a Budweiser advertising jingle in 1970. It became popular among Wisconsin fans when the band traveled to Boston for the 1973 NCAA men's hockey championship, where the song was played at games, on the street, and in hotel lobbies. When performed by the Wisconsin band, the advertising line at the end of the original beer ad is replaced by the line "When You Say WIS-CON-SIN, You've Said It All!"

On Saturday, Nov. 24, 2018, Michael Leckrone directed his last "Fifth Quarter" performance after a 50-year career leading UW-Madison's marching band. Leckrone and the band started the tradition in 1969 when he became the director of the band.

Since assuming the directorship, Dr. Corey Pompey has added "Friends in Low Places" to the 5th Quarter Repertoire.

=== The "6th Quarter" and Dismissal ===
At the end of the Fifth Quarter, the band lines up once more to play "Varsity", while the spectators sing. The band then exits the field to the north entrance to perform the "6th Quarter" outside the stadium. Crowd favorites like "1812 Overture", "The Horse", "Rock and Roll #2", and "It's Hard to Be Humble", a band tradition. The band then marches back to the George Mosse Humanities building on campus for dismissal.

At Dismissal, the band skyrockets each TA, the Directors, the announcer, the Drum Major, and the adage: TEAM. FANS. BAND. They reflect on the day as the directors and the drum major give speeches. The band then sings Varsity a capella and is dismissed.

=== Band banquet ===
Begun during the 1927–1928 school year by then-band director, Edson W. Morphy, and traditionally held in late November or early December, the band banquet is a formal affair, with speakers and an awards ceremony. The percussion section performs drum cadences with plates and silverware. The night ends with a slide show and the singing of Varsity.

=== On Wisconsin Finale ===
Beginning in 1974 the halftime show of the last home football game of the year is ended with On Wisconsin Finale. While playing a maestoso version of On Wisconsin, the band forms vertical lines. At once, lines expand into the letters On Wis and the band marches towards the audience, ending the performance with the graduating members of the band being recognized as the rest of the band kneels.

=== Reversing the Caps ===
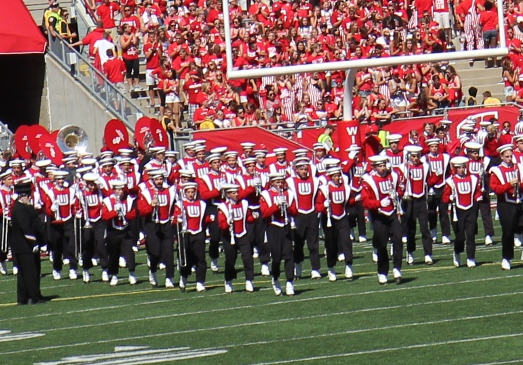
Entering the field for the 5th quarter with reversed hats

When the football team wins the game, the members of the band take their hats off and put them on backwards. This is an old tradition that signifies "looking back" at the victory that day.

=== Skyrockets ===
Skyrockets are a method the Wisconsin Band has used to call attention to something, such as in announcing a song or cheer, telling a joke, or greeting someone. The sound of a skyrocket is meant to mimic a real rocket by beginning in a low hiss, followed by a short, loud "boom", then an "ahhh", and finally ending in a whistle.

=== Tuba March ===
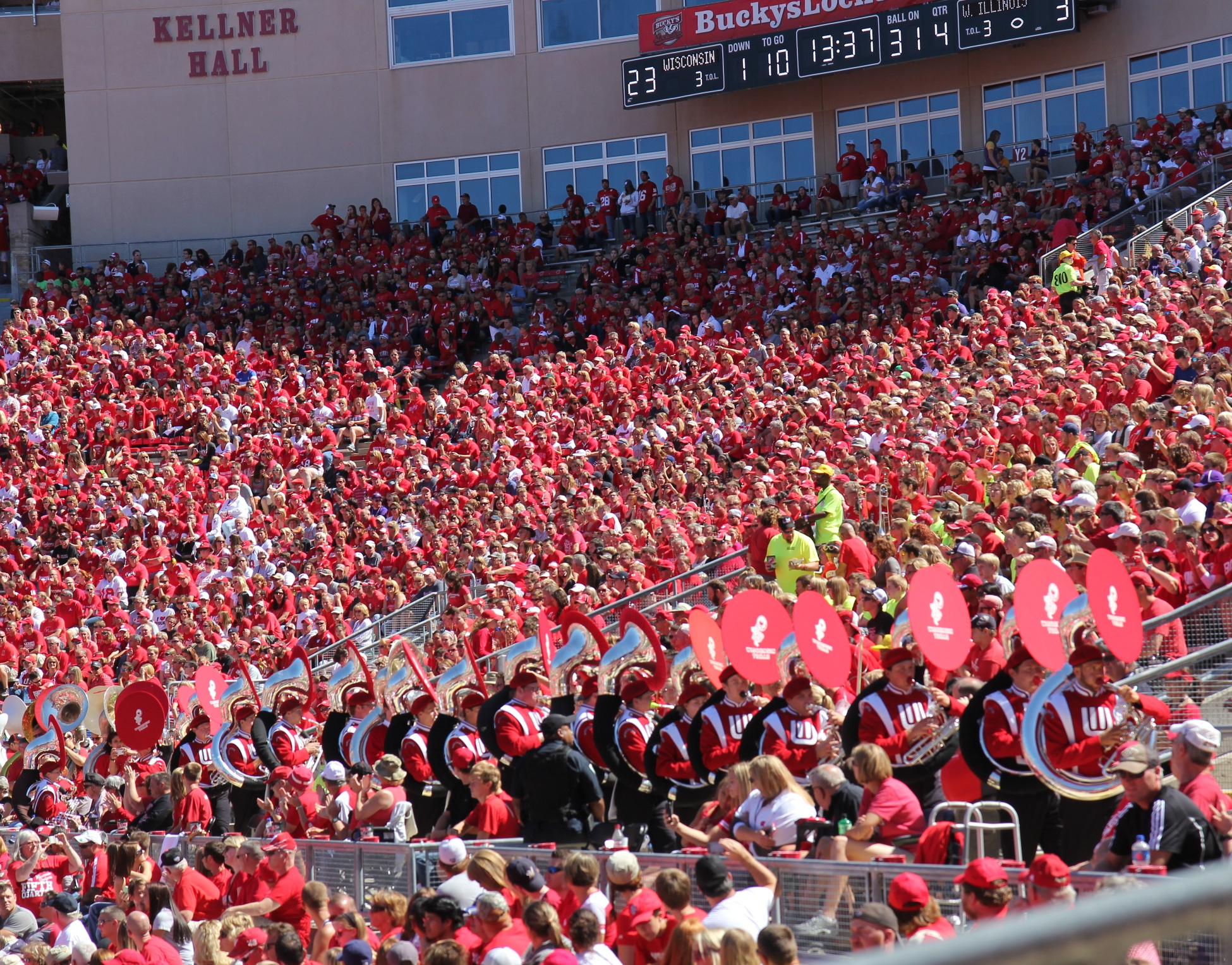
Tuba March

At the beginning of the fourth quarter the tubas line up single file and march around the stadium, weaving in and out of the stands and concourse, playing songs such as Semper Fidelis, Beer Barrel Polka, and On Wisconsin. This tradition began in the 1950s. When athletic director Elroy Hirsch banned the tuba march in 1971, the uproar was so great that the tuba march was reinstated the following year.

=== Union South ===
One hour before every home game, the Badger Band performs at Badger Bash, a pregame tailgate, at Union South. The band marches in to the drumline cadence, with the tubas playing the tuba march and following shortly after. The band plays On Wisconsin twice, an abbreviated version of the opposing school's song, the pop music piece selected for that week's pregame show, the halftime show, and finally "The Bud Song" and On Wisconsin one last time to fire up the fans. They then march to Camp Randall Stadium and performs their pre-game show shortly after.

== Other performances ==
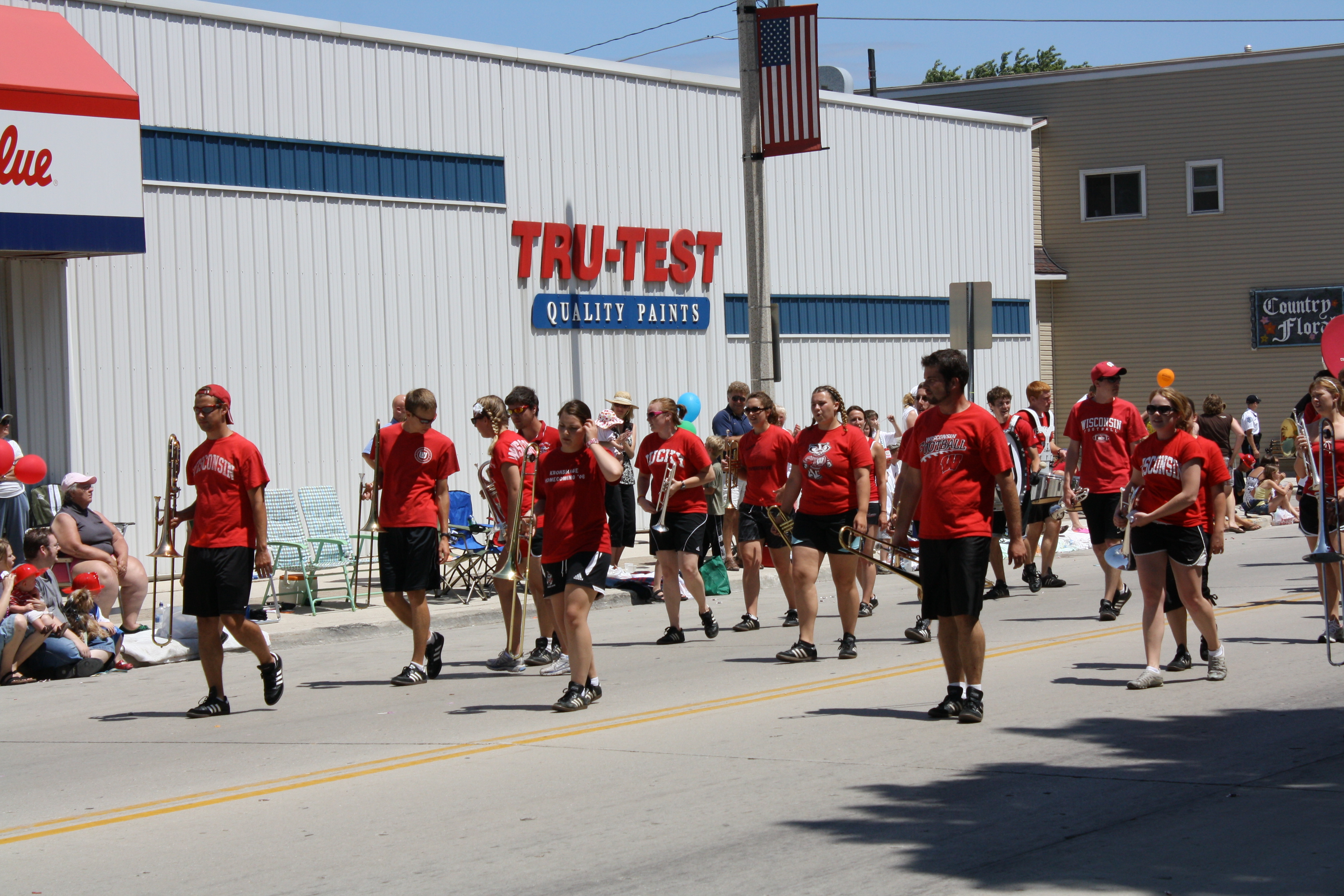
Marching in the 2009 New Holstein parade

The band performs at other venues, such as local concerts and parades around the state of Wisconsin. The band has also performed at NFL games, often making the trip to Lambeau Field to play for the in-state Green Bay Packers.
