= Michael Leckrone =

American music professor and band director (born 1936)

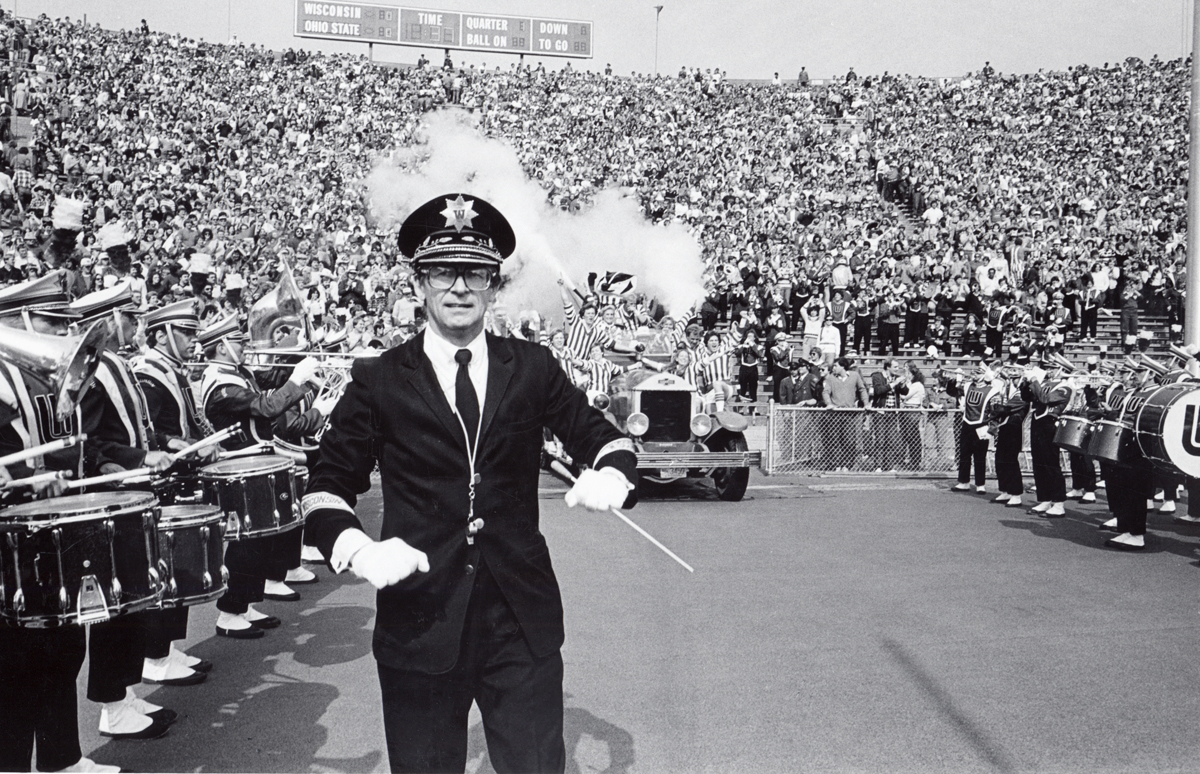
Mike Leckrone with the UW Band, circa 1979

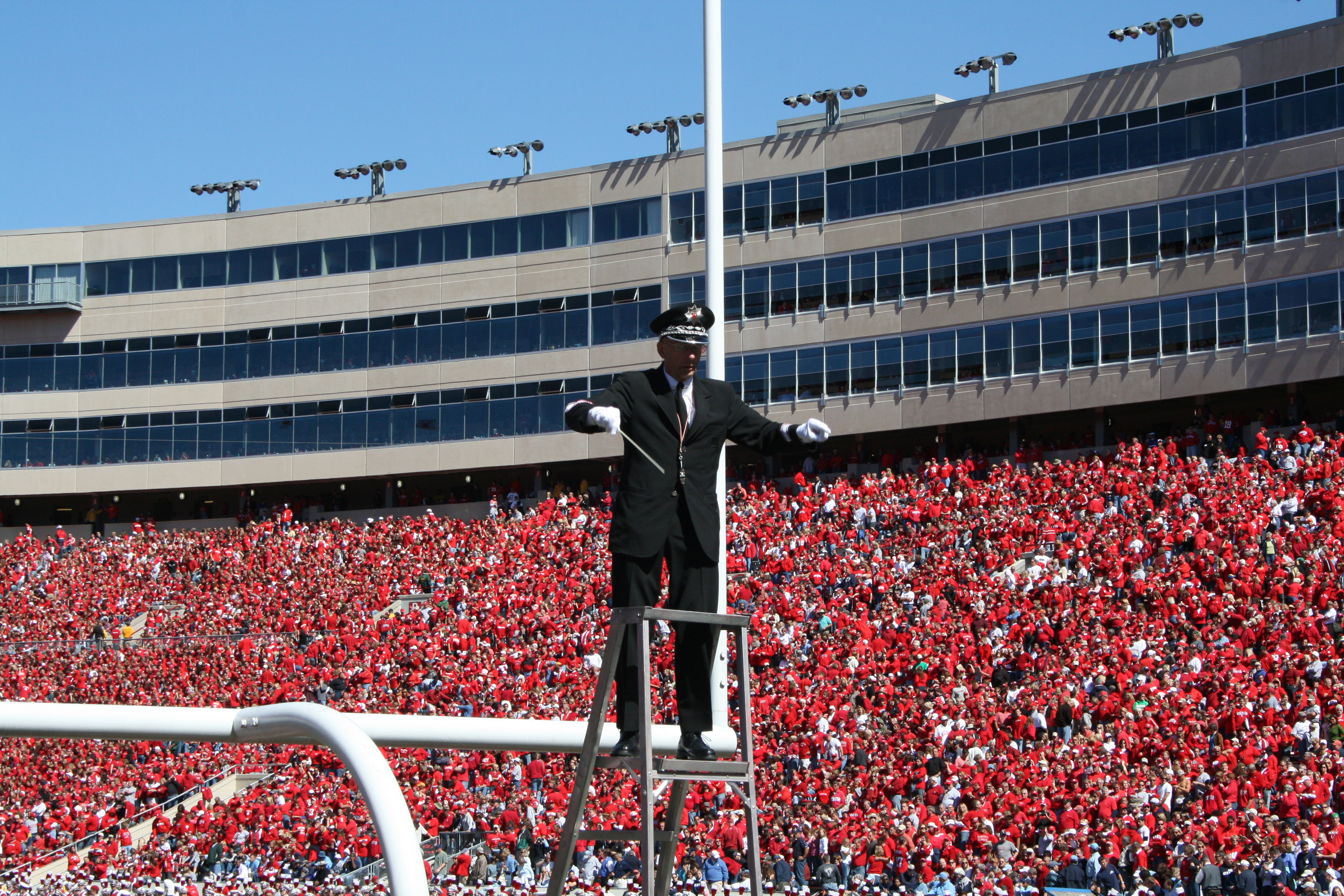
Mike Leckrone

Michael “Mike” Leckrone (born July 30, 1936) was a John Bascom Professor of Music in the University of Wisconsin–Madison School of Music and director of the University of Wisconsin Marching Band from 1969 to 2019. Leckrone also served as Director of Bands in the UW–Madison School of Music from 1972 to 2019. He is noted for his extraordinary ability to remember the names of all the past and present members of the band, as well as where they were from, and what instrument they played.

== Background ==
Leckrone grew up in North Manchester, Indiana. His father, Harold Leckrone, was the high school band teacher, but never pressured his son to follow in his professional footsteps, which included a contribution to the score of the 1986 film Hoosiers. Instead, Leckrone entertained thoughts of becoming anything from a basketball coach to a chemical engineer.

A native of Indiana, Leckrone received his bachelor and masters of music at Butler University where he played basketball his freshman year, backing up Bobby Plump, who was the real life hero on whom the character Jimmy Chitwood in the movie Hoosiers was based. He then studied at the doctoral level at Indiana University. He eventually became the director of bands for three years at his alma mater, Butler University. In 1969, he became the director of the marching band at the University of Wisconsin–Madison. He has composed and arranged many pieces, and over 200 of his compositions for marching and concert bands have been published.

== Tenure at Wisconsin ==
When Leckrone became director of the Wisconsin Marching Band, interest in the program was low. By creating a new, demanding marching style, "stop at the top", a pre-game run on, and emphasizing showmanship, he turned the program around. Talking about his half-time shows, Leckrone said, "I have always patterned my shows around the old Ed Sullivan Television Show. The most important thing the Sullivan Show had going for it was variety. If you didn't like an act that Ed introduced, you knew that in a minute or two, there would be something entirely different." He also extended his efforts off the football field by establishing the Varsity Band to play at other sporting events.

On August 25, 2018, Leckrone announced his plans to retire after the 2018–2019 academic year.

== Spring Concert ==
Mike Leckrone flying in at the 2008 Spring Concert

In 1975, Leckrone created the Varsity Band's Annual Spring Concert. The first show had a crowd of only 450; now there are three concerts each spring before 25,000 fans at the Kohl Center. The concert marks the final performance for the band each year.

== Awards and recognitions ==
- Named an "Outstanding Educator of America" by the Outstanding Americans Foundation in 1970.
- Awarded the "Outstanding Bandmaster Award" by the Wisconsin Chapter of Phi Beta in 1973.
- Presented with a Citation of Excellence by the National Band Association in 1986.
- Received the "Pat O'Dea Award", the "Blue Line Club Distinguished Service Award", the "Badger Basketball Boosters Distinguished Service Award", the UW Alumni Club "Distinguished Faculty Award", and the Wisconsin Newspaper Writers "Special Edition Award".
- Inducted into the Wisconsin Hockey Hall of Fame and the Wisconsin Football Hall of Fame.
- Named to a "John Bascom Professorship" by the University of Wisconsin–Madison.
- Received the Lifetime Achievement Award in Music from the Wisconsin Foundation for School Music in 2007.
- Presented with a "Hometown Hero" award by the Wisconsin State Assembly in 2015.
- Presented with the Phi Mu Alpha Sinfonia Lifetime Achievement Award in 2018.
