= Claire Voyant (band) =

American indie pop and downtempo band

- Origin: Sacramento, California, U.S.
- Genres: Darkwave, dream pop, trip hop, downtempo, ethereal wave
- Years active: 1995–2009
- Label: Metropolis
- Members: Victoria Lloyd; Chris Ross; Ben Fargen; Garin Casaleggio

Claire Voyant was a darkwave and dream pop band from Sacramento, California. Founded by childhood friends Chris Ross and Ben Fargen, the act was an instrumental duo until recruiting vocalist Victoria Lloyd. Their 1995 debut has been followed by three more studio albums; Time and the Maiden in 1998, Love Is Blind in 2002, and Lustre in 2009.

== History ==
Prior to the formation of Claire Voyant, founding members, Ross, Fargen, and Lloyd were part of a different project, Murmur. Upon realization that Ross had the ability to produce what the other members of Murmur's quartet could provide, the trio decided to start their own project (Claire Voyant). With difficulties deciphering what to name the project, member Lloyd came across the name "Claire Voyant" in a 1940s comic-strip.

They released their debut in 1995 independently, under self-label Nocturne. Eventually gaining the attention of German label, Hyperium Records. Hyperium included Claire Voyant's song "Her" on their Heavenly Voices IV compilation album, which garnered the project notability within the European market. Hyperium went on to distribute their next album Time and the Maiden. Their third album, Love Is Blind, was released in 2002 on Philadelphia indie label Metropolis. The Philadelphian label also re-releasing the previously mentioned Time and the Maiden with bonus tracks for their US market. The reissued album peaked at #29 on the CMJ RPM Charts in the U.S.

The project was disbanded on September 22, 2009, only shortly after the release of its fourth studio album, Lustre.

== Discography ==
=== Studio albums ===
- Claire Voyant (1995)
- Time and the Maiden (1998) (Re-released in 2000 with three bonus tracks)
- Love Is Blind (2002)
- Lustre (2009)

=== Other ===
- Time Again (2000) (remix collection)

== Members ==
- Victoria Lloyd – vocals
- Chris Ross – keyboards and programming
- Ben Fargen – guitars
- Garin Casaleggio – drums and percussion
