= 1976–77 Wisconsin Badgers men's ice hockey season =

American college ice hockey season

National champion Big Ten, champion WCHA, champion WCHA Tournament, champion NCAA Tournament, champion
- Conference: 1st Big Ten; 1st WCHA
- Home ice: Dane County Coliseum

Record
- Overall: 37–7–1 (26–5–1 / 9–3)
- Home: 16–5
- Road: 13–2–1
- Neutral: 8–0

Coaches and captains
- Head coach: Bob Johnson
- Assistant coaches: Grant Standbrook
- Captain(s): Mike Eaves; Steve Alley; John Taft

The 1976–77 Wisconsin Badgers men's ice hockey team represented the University of Wisconsin–Madison in college ice hockey. In its tenth year under head coach Bob Johnson, the team compiled a 37–7–1 record (26–5–1 against Western Collegiate Hockey Association (WCHA) opponents) and outscored all opponents 264 to 161. The Badgers received the WCHA's automatic bid to the 1977 NCAA Division I Men's Ice Hockey Tournament by winning the 1977 WCHA Men's Ice Hockey Tournament, the only singular WCHA tournament champion over a 16-year period (1965 to 1981). They defeated the New Hampshire Wildcats in the Frozen Four semifinals and then beat WCHA- and Big Ten-rival Michigan Wolverines by a 6–5 score in overtime to win the national championship in Detroit, Michigan.

Goalie Julian Baretta was chosen as the Most Outstanding Player in the NCAA Tournament. He had two shutouts and a .905 save percentage for the season. The team's leading scorer was junior defenseman Craig Norwich with 18 goals, 65 assists, and 83 points. Norwich was the third defenseman (Bob Heathcott, 1952; Dan Lodboa, 1970) in NCAA history to lead his team in scoring while winning a National Title in the same season (the next occurrence was 2018).

== Season ==
Head coach Bob Johnson returned to the program after taking a year off to coach the Team USA at the 1976 Winter Olympics in Innsbruck. The Olympic team finished a disappointing 5th-place after taking Silver in 1972 but the Badgers had fared even worse in Johnson's absence. Wisconsin went 12–24–1 under interim coach Bill Rothwell, compiling their first losing season since returning to varsity status in 1963 (The Badgers would not have another losing season until 1995–96).

Seeking to erase the previous year from their collective memories, the Badgers opened with a 6–7 overtime loss to dual conference rival Michigan but evened their record with an overtime win the following day. Over the next six games, Wisconsin scored no less than 5 times, winning each match until Michigan State handed them their second defeat of the season. After trading wins with several teams, and losing a match to HC Spartak Moscow, Wisconsin won 12 games in a row after the new year, rocketing up the standings to take first place in the WCHA. Wisconsin finished the regular season winning 26 of their 32 WCHA games to capture their first conference title and were led by Craig Norwich in scoring. Norwich's 63 points in WCHA play was good for third best across the conference and paced all defensemen by a wide margin.

Prior to the season, the NCAA instituted a new policy where they gave their tournament selection committee the ability to add up to four additional teams to the tournament. In response to this the WCHA changed their tournament format to have a solitary champion that would receive an automatic tournament bid rather than two co-champions who would both proceed to the national championship. This format would be in place for only the 1977 season and would revert to a co-champion system in 1978. Because of this Wisconsin would have to face three rounds of competitors rather than the customary two to win the WCHA tournament.

The Badgers played 8th-place Colorado College in the quarterfinals, who made the tournament over Michigan State based on tie-breakers. Though the Tigers had lost all four games to Wisconsin in the regular season they had done so with only seven fewer goals than the Badgers. In the two-game series Colorado College held Wisconsin's high-powered offense to only three goals twice, far below their average, but could only manage one score in each contest. In the semifinals the Badgers faced off against an upstart Minnesota squad that had defeated #2 seed Notre Dame in the opening round. The Golden Gophers were no match for the Badgers who took the series 17–8 and were set against Michigan in the championship series. Wisconsin got off to a great start, taking the first game 4–0, before cruising to a WCHA championship with a 5–4 win in the following game to take the series 9–4. The title gave Wisconsin an automatic bid to the 1977 NCAA tournament as the #1 western seed.

In their first game at the Olympia Stadium Wisconsin played New Hampshire, who possessed the #1 offense in the east. The two teams fought to a 3–3 tie after regulation but Julian Baretta kept everything out of the Badger's net in the extra frame and allowed Mike Eaves to score the game-winner. The championship match set Johnson's Badgers against Farrell's Wolverines for the seventh time that season. Wisconsin's offensive firepower was apparent from the start and the Badgers jumped out to a 3–0 lead on the strength of two power play goals. Michigan replied with two man-advantage markers of their own to cut the score to 3–2 but goals by Mike Meeker and Mark Johnson at the beginnings of the second and third periods rebuilt the Badger's 3-goal lead. The Wolverines, however, would not go away and Mark Miller scored 26 seconds after Johnson's second goal of the game. Dave Debol notched his second less than a minute later to cut Wisconsin's lead to 1 goal and it was completely erased with less than 6 minutes in regulation by John Wayman. With the score tied and the Badger's reeling Baretta kept the score tied 5–5 and allowed Wisconsin to regain their footing as the two teams headed into overtime. In what turned out to be the shortest overtime period in NCAA championship history, Steve Alley backhanded the puck past Michigan netminder Rick Palmer and sent the Badger faithful into paroxysms of joy.

Wisconsin won its second National Title in 5 years on the strength of its power play, scoring a then-record 93 goals on the man-advantage over the course of the season. Only the 1980 Minnesota team has scored more (99). Mark Johnson set an NCAA record for freshman in assists (44) and points (80) and was named WCHA Freshman of the Year. Bob Johnson was named as the WCHA Coach of the Year while Julian Baretta and Craig Norwich earned both First Team All-WCHA and AHCA All-American honors. Mike Eaves was selected for the WCHA Second Team and an All-American while John Taft received a spot on the WCHA Second Team.

== Standings ==
1976–77 Western Collegiate Hockey Association standings
| | Conference | | | | | | | Overall | | | | | |
| | GP | W | L | T | PTS | GF | GA | GP | W | L | T | GF | GA |
|---|---|---|---|---|---|---|---|---|---|---|---|---|---|
| Wisconsin†* | 32 | 26 | 5 | 1 | 53 | 192 | 122 | 45 | 37 | 7 | 1 | 264 | 161 |
| Notre Dame | 32 | 19 | 10 | 3 | 41 | 164 | 127 | 38 | 22 | 13 | 3 | 191 | 147 |
| Michigan | 32 | 20 | 12 | 0 | 40 | 183 | 151 | 45 | 28 | 17 | 0 | 260 | 211 |
| Denver | 32 | 16 | 14 | 2 | 34 | 154 | 151 | 40 | 21 | 17 | 2 | 206 | 187 |
| North Dakota | 32 | 16 | 16 | 0 | 32 | 168 | 158 | 38 | 19 | 19 | 0 | 202 | 184 |
| Michigan Tech | 32 | 15 | 16 | 1 | 31 | 143 | 150 | 38 | 19 | 18 | 1 | 177 | 178 |
| Minnesota | 32 | 13 | 16 | 3 | 29 | 135 | 144 | 41 | 17 | 21 | 3 | 177 | 202 |
| Colorado College | 32 | 11 | 20 | 1 | 23 | 156 | 170 | 40 | 13 | 25 | 2 | 194 | 209 |
| Michigan State | 32 | 11 | 20 | 1 | 23 | 122 | 171 | 36 | 14 | 21 | 1 | 145 | 189 |
| Minnesota-Duluth | 32 | 6 | 24 | 2 | 14 | 119 | 192 | 37 | 9 | 26 | 2 | 148 | 219 |
Championship: Wisconsin † indicates conference regular season champion * indicates conference tournament champion

1976–77 Big Ten standings
| | Conference | | | | | | | Overall | | | | | |
| | GP | W | L | T | PTS | GF | GA | GP | W | L | T | GF | GA |
|---|---|---|---|---|---|---|---|---|---|---|---|---|---|
| Wisconsin† | 12 | 9 | 3 | 0 | 18 | 78 | 47 | 45 | 37 | 7 | 1 | 264 | 161 |
| Michigan | 12 | 7 | 5 | 0 | 14 | 68 | 61 | 45 | 28 | 17 | 0 | 260 | 211 |
| Minnesota | 12 | 5 | 7 | 0 | 10 | 46 | 56 | 41 | 17 | 21 | 3 | 177 | 202 |
| Michigan State | 12 | 3 | 9 | 0 | 6 | 41 | 69 | 36 | 14 | 21 | 1 | 145 | 189 |
† indicates conference regular season champion

=== Schedule ===
During the season, Wisconsin compiled a 37–7–1 record, the best year the program has ever produced. Its schedule was as follows.

| Date | Opponent | Score | Result | Venue | Location | Record (WCHA / Big Ten) |
|---|---|---|---|---|---|---|
| Oct. 15, 1976 | Michigan ‡ | 6–7* | Loss | Dane County Coliseum | Madison, WI | 0–1 (0–1 / 0–1) |
| Oct. 16, 1976 | Michigan ‡ | 7–6* | Win | Dane County Coliseum | Madison, WI | 1–1 (1–1 / 1–1) |
| Oct. 22, 1976 | Western Ontario | 11–2 | Win | Dane County Coliseum | Madison, WI | 2–1 (1–1 / 1–1) |
| Oct. 23, 1976 | Western Ontario | 8–4 | Win | Dane County Coliseum | Madison, WI | 3–1 (1–1 / 1–1) |
| Nov. 5, 1976 | Minnesota–Duluth † | 5–4 | Win | DECC | Duluth, MN | 4–1 (2–1 / 1–1) |
| Nov. 6, 1976 | Minnesota–Duluth † | 7–5 | Win | DECC | Duluth, MN | 5–1 (3–1 / 1–1) |
| Nov. 12, 1976 | Colorado College † | 6–5 | Win | Dane County Coliseum | Madison, WI | 6–1 (4–1 / 1–1) |
| Nov. 13, 1976 | Colorado College † | 5–4 | Win | Dane County Coliseum | Madison, WI | 7–1 (5–1 / 1–1) |
| Nov. 19, 1976 | Michigan State ‡ | 2–5 | Loss | Munn Ice Arena | East Lansing, MI | 7–2 (5–2 / 1–2) |
| Nov. 20, 1976 | Michigan State ‡ | 8–0 | Win | Munn Ice Arena | East Lansing, MI | 8–2 (6–2 / 2–2) |
| Nov. 26, 1976 | Notre Dame † | 1–4 | Loss | Dane County Coliseum | Madison, WI | 8–3 (6–3 / 2–2) |
| Nov. 27, 1976 | Notre Dame † | 4–3 | Win | Dane County Coliseum | Madison, WI | 9–3 (7–3 / 2–2) |
| Dec. 3, 1976 | Minnesota ‡ | 4–3* | Win | Williams Arena | Minneapolis, MN | 10–3 (8–3 / 3–2) |
| Dec. 4, 1976 | Minnesota ‡ | 7–2 | Win | Williams Arena | Minneapolis, MN | 11–3 (9–3 / 4–2) |
| Dec. 10, 1976 | North Dakota † | 6–2 | Win | Dane County Coliseum | Madison, WI | 12–3 (10–3 / 4–2) |
| Dec. 11, 1976 | North Dakota † | 11–6 | Win | Dane County Coliseum | Madison, WI | 13–3 (11–3 / 4–2) |
| Dec. 29, 1976 | Harvard | 3–4 | Loss | Dane County Coliseum | Madison, WI | 13–4 (11–3 / 4–2) |
| Dec. 30, 1976 | Harvard | 7–5 | Win | Dane County Coliseum | Madison, WI | 14–4 (11–3 / 4–2) |
| Dec. 31, 1976 | HC Spartak Moscow | 1–2 | Loss | Dane County Coliseum | Madison, WI | 14–5 (11–3 / 4–2) |
| Jan. 7, 1977 | Minnesota ‡ | 7–1 | Win | Dane County Coliseum | Madison, WI | 15–5 (12–3 / 5–2) |
| Jan. 8, 1977 | Minnesota ‡ | 4–5 | Loss | Dane County Coliseum | Madison, WI | 15–6 (12–4 / 5–3) |
| Jan. 14, 1977 | North Dakota † | 7–6* | Win | Ralph Engelstad Arena | Grand Forks, ND | 16–6 (13–4 / 5–3) |
| Jan. 15, 1977 | North Dakota † | 8–7* | Win | Ralph Engelstad Arena | Grand Forks, ND | 17–6 (14–4 / 5–3) |
| Jan. 21, 1977 | Colorado College † | 6–3 | Win | Broadmoor World Arena | Colorado Springs, CO | 18–6 (15–4 / 5–3) |
| Jan. 22, 1977 | Colorado College † | 4–1 | Win | Broadmoor World Arena | Colorado Springs, CO | 19–6 (16–4 / 5–3) |
| Jan. 28, 1977 | Michigan State ‡ | 10–6 | Win | Dane County Coliseum | Madison, WI | 20–6 (17–4 / 6–3) |
| Jan. 29, 1977 | Michigan State ‡ | 9–2 | Win | Dane County Coliseum | Madison, WI | 21–6 (18–4 / 7–3) |
| Feb. 4, 1977 | Michigan ‡ | 3–2 | Win | Yost Ice Arena | Ann Arbor, MI | 22–6 (19–4 / 8–3) |
| Feb. 5, 1977 | Michigan ‡ | 11–8 | Win | Yost Ice Arena | Ann Arbor, MI | 23–6 (20–4 / 9–3) |
| Feb. 11, 1977 | Michigan Tech † | 8–4 | Win | Dane County Coliseum | Madison, WI | 24–6 (21–4 / 9–3) |
| Feb. 12, 1977 | Michigan Tech † | 4–3 | Win | Dane County Coliseum | Madison, WI | 25–6 (22–4 / 9–3) |
| Feb. 18, 1977 | Minnesota–Duluth † | 7–4 | Win | Dane County Coliseum | Madison, WI | 26–6 (23–4 / 9–3) |
| Feb. 19, 1977 | Minnesota–Duluth † | 6–4 | Win | Dane County Coliseum | Madison, WI | 27–6 (24–4 / 9–3) |
| Feb. 25, 1977 | Denver † | 3–6 | Loss | DU Arena | Denver, CO | 27–7 (24–5 / 9–3) |
| Feb. 26, 1977 | Denver † | 5–2 | Win | DU Arena | Denver, CO | 28–7 (25–5 / 9–3) |
| Mar. 4, 1977 | Notre Dame † | 8–3 | Win | Joyce Center | Notre Dame, IN | 29–7 (26–5 / 9–3) |
| Mar. 5, 1977 | Notre Dame † | 3–3* | Tie | Joyce Center | Notre Dame, IN | 29–7–1 (26–5–1 / 9–3) |
WCHA TOURNAMENT
| Mar. 9, 1977 | Colorado College | 3–1 | Win | Dane County Coliseum | Madison, WI | 30–7–1 (26–5–1 / 9–3) |
| Mar. 10, 1977 | Colorado College | 3–1 | Win | Dane County Coliseum | Madison, WI | 31–7–1 (26–5–1 / 9–3) |
Wisconsin Wins Series 6–2
| Mar. 12, 1977 | Minnesota | 9–5 | Win | Dane County Coliseum | Madison, WI | 32–7–1 (26–5–1 / 9–3) |
| Mar. 13, 1977 | Minnesota | 8–3 | Win | Dane County Coliseum | Madison, WI | 33–7–1 (26–5–1 / 9–3) |
Wisconsin Wins Series 17–8
| Mar. 16, 1977 | Michigan | 4–0 | Win | Dane County Coliseum | Madison, WI | 34–7–1 (26–5–1 / 9–3) |
| Mar. 17, 1977 | Michigan | 5–4 | Win | Dane County Coliseum | Madison, WI | 35–7–1 (26–5–1 / 9–3) |
Wisconsin Wins Series 9–4
NCAA TOURNAMENT
| March 25, 1977 | New Hampshire | 4–3* | Win | Olympia Stadium | Detroit, MI | 36–7–1 (26–5–1 / 9–3) |
| March 26, 1977 | Michigan | 6–5* | Win | Olympia Stadium | Detroit, MI | 37–7–1 (26–5–1 / 9–3) |
| | | 264–161 | | | | 37–7–1 (26–5–1 / 9–3) |

* Denotes overtime periods
† WCHA game
‡ Big Ten and WCHA game

== National championship ==
=== (W1) Wisconsin vs. (W2) Michigan ===
| March 26 | Wisconsin | 6–5 | OT | Michigan | Olympia Stadium |

Scoring summary
| Period | Team | Goal | Assist(s) | Time | Score |
|---|---|---|---|---|---|
| 1st | WIS | Steve Alley – PP | Norwich and Eaves | 2:29 | 1–0 WIS |
| 1st | WIS | Dave Herbst | Norwich and Lundeen | 9:27 | 2–0 WIS |
| 1st | WIS | Mark Johnson – PP | Eaves and Alley | 15:12 | 3–0 WIS |
| 1st | UM | Kip Maurer – PP | Manery and Palmer | 16:13 | 3–1 WIS |
| 2nd | UM | Dave Debol – PP | Maurer and Palmer | 21:33 | 3–2 WIS |
| 2nd | WIS | Mike Meeker | Johnson and Suter | 22:54 | 4–2 WIS |
| 3rd | WIS | Mark Johnson | Grauer and Meeker | 41:10 | 5–2 WIS |
| 3rd | UM | Mark Miller | Debol and Todd | 41:36 | 5–3 WIS |
| 3rd | UM | Dave Debol | Thayer | 42:14 | 5–4 WIS |
| 3rd | UM | John Wayman | Maurer | 54:22 | 5–5 |
| 1st Overtime | WIS | Steve Alley – GW | Eaves and Ulseth | 60:23 | 6–5 WIS |
Penalty summary
| Period | Team | Player | Penalty | Time | PIM |
| 1st | UM | Kris Manery | Hooking | 1:12 | 2:00 |
| 1st | WIS | Dave Herbst | Hooking | 5:48 | 2:00 |
| 1st | UM | Dane Hoene | Tripping | 15:01 | 2:00 |
| 1st | WIS | Murray Johnson | Elbowing | 15:21 | 2:00 |
| 1st | WIS | Craig Norwich | High–Sticking | 19:20 | 2:00 |
| 1st | UM | John Wayman | High–Sticking | 19:20 | 2:00 |
| 2nd | WIS | Steve Alley | Hooking | 20:30 | 2:00 |
| 2nd | WIS | Dave Herbst | Tripping | 22:54 | 2:00 |
| 2nd | UM | Dean Turner | Interference | 28:44 | 2:00 |
| 2nd | WIS | Bob Suter | Roughing | 34:44 | 2:00 |
| 2nd | WIS | Craig Norwich | Roughing | 37:13 | 2:00 |
| 3rd | WIS | Craig Norwich | High–Sticking | 41:55 | 2:00 |
| 3rd | UM | Dane Hoene | High–Sticking | 41:55 | 2:00 |
| 3rd | UM | John McCahill | Hooking | 45:03 | 2:00 |
| 3rd | WIS | John Taft | Tripping | 48:41 | 2:00 |

Shots by period
| Team | 1 | 2 | 3 | OT | T |
|---|---|---|---|---|---|
| Michigan | 11 | 13 | 15 | 0 | 39 |
| Wisconsin | 11 | 10 | 8 | 1 | 30 |

Goaltenders
| Team | Name | Saves | Goals against | Time on ice |
|---|---|---|---|---|
| UM | Rick Palmer | 24 | 6 | |
| WIS | Julian Baretta | 34 | 5 | |

== Roster and scoring statistics ==
| No. | Name | Year | Position | Hometown | S/P/C | Games | Goals | Assists | Pts | PIM |
|---|---|---|---|---|---|---|---|---|---|---|
| 5 | Craig Norwich | Junior | D | Edina, MN | (Minnesota) | 44 | 18 | 65 | 83 | 70 |
| 17 | Mike Eaves | Junior | C | Denver, CO | (Colorado) | 45 | 28 | 53 | 81 | 18 |
| 10 | Mark Johnson | Freshman | C | Minneapolis, MN | (Minnesota) | 43 | 36 | 44 | 80 | 16 |
| 11 | Steve Alley | Senior | LW | Anoka, MN | (Minnesota) | 45 | 32 | 31 | 63 | 50 |
| 7 | John Taft | Senior | D | Minneapolis, MN | (Minnesota) | 42 | 15 | 43 | 58 | 41 |
| 9 | Les Grauer | Sophomore | LW | Leader, SK | (Saskatchewan) | 43 | 21 | 33 | 54 | 42 |
| 19 | Mike Meeker | Sophomore | W | Kingston, ON | (Ontario) | 41 | 26 | 27 | 53 | 50 |
| 22 | Dave Lundeen | Senior | C | Minneapolis, MN | (Minnesota) | 44 | 18 | 29 | 47 | 110 |
| 25 | Dave Herbst | Junior | W | Saint Paul, MN | (Minnesota) | 45 | 14 | 19 | 33 | 72 |
| 16 | Tom Ulseth | Junior | RW | Moorhead, MN | (Minnesota) | 42 | 13 | 18 | 31 | 10 |
| 8 | Norm McIntosh | Junior | D | Grande Prairie, AB | (Alberta) | 45 | 8 | 20 | 28 | 58 |
| 20 | Mark Capouch | Junior | RW | Grand Forks, ND | (North Dakota) | 44 | 11 | 12 | 23 | 14 |
| 2 | Bob Suter | Sophomore | D | Madison, WI | (Wisconsin) | 38 | 3 | 15 | 18 | 107 |
| 18 | Murray Johnson | Junior | W | Minneapolis, MN | (Minnesota) | 43 | 7 | 6 | 13 | 40 |
| 26 | Ron Griffin | Freshman | D | Detroit, MI | (Michigan) | 35 | 5 | 8 | 13 | 14 |
| 15 | Tim Phippen | Freshman | LW | Saint Paul, MN | (Minnesota) | 27 | 3 | 5 | 8 | 16 |
| 3 | John Suter | Junior | D | Madison, WI | (Wisconsin) | 40 | 2 | 3 | 5 | 30 |
| 24 | Rod Romanchuk | Sophomore | C | Saint Paul, MN | (Minnesota) | 43 | 1 | 3 | 4 | 12 |
| 29 | Jim Scheid | Freshman | C | Rochester, MN | (Minnesota) | 7 | 1 | 2 | 3 | 0 |
| 23 | George Gwozdecky | Senior | LW | Thunder Bay, ON | (Ontario) | 12 | 1 | 2 | 3 | 8 |
| 14 | Brad Mullins | Junior | D | North Bay, ON | (Ontario) | 15 | 1 | 0 | 1 | 12 |
| 12 | Ian Perrin | Junior | D | Spy Hill, SK | (Saskatchewan) | 8 | 0 | 1 | 1 | 0 |
| 4 | John Gregory | Junior | D | Maple Ridge, BC | (British Columbia) | 10 | 0 | 1 | 1 | 0 |
| 1 | Julian Baretta | Sophomore | G | Madison, WI | (Wisconsin) | 26 | 0 | 1 | 1 | 0 |
| 30 | Dave McNab | Senior | G | San Diego, CA | (California) | 3 | 0 | 0 | 0 | 0 |
| 21 | Clark Kavolinas | Sophomore | W | Surrey, BC | (British Columbia) | 8 | 0 | 0 | 0 | 4 |
| 27 | Mike Dibble | Senior | G | Minneapolis, MN | (Minnesota) | 22 | 0 | 0 | 0 | 0 |
| Total | | | | | | 860 | 264 | 441 | 705 | 794 |

== Goaltending Statistics ==
| No. | Name | Games | Minutes | Wins | Losses | Ties | Goals against | Saves | Shut outs | SV % | GAA |
|---|---|---|---|---|---|---|---|---|---|---|---|
| 30 | Dave McNab | 3 | 60 | 2 | 0 | 0 | 3 | 22 | 0 | 0.880 | 3.00 |
| 1 | Julian Baretta | 26 | 1458 | 21 | 2 | 0 | 75 | 714 | 2 | 0.905 | 3.08 |
| 27 | Mike Dibble | 22 | 1219 | 14 | 5 | 1 | 83 | 686 | 0 | 0.892 | 4.08 |
| Total | | | 2737 | 37 | 7 | 1 | 161 | 1422 | 2 | .898 | 3.53 |

== Players drafted into the NHL/WHA ==
=== 1977 NHL amateur draft ===
| = NHL All-Star team | = NHL All-Star | = NHL All-Star and NHL All-Star team | = Did not play in the NHL |

| Round | Pick | Player | NHL team |
|---|---|---|---|
| 4 | 66 | Mark Johnson | Pittsburgh Penguins |
| 5 | 84 | Julian Baretta | Los Angeles Kings |
| 7 | 120 | Bob Suter | Los Angeles Kings |

=== 1977 WHA Amateur Draft ===
| = Did not play in the WHA |

| Round | Pick | Player | WHA Team |
|---|---|---|---|
| 3 | 22 | Mark Johnson | Birmingham Bulls |
| 6 | 51 | Julian Baretta | Edmonton Oilers |
| 7 | 58 | Bob Suter | Birmingham Bulls |

== See also ==
- 1977 NCAA Division I Men's Ice Hockey Tournament
- List of NCAA Division I Men's Ice Hockey Tournament champions
