= 1977 NCAA Division I men's ice hockey tournament =

- Teams: 5
- Finals site: Olympia Stadium, Detroit, Michigan
- Champions: Wisconsin Badgers (2nd title)
- Runner-up: Michigan Wolverines (9th title game)
- Semifinalists: Boston University Terriers (12th Frozen Four); New Hampshire Wildcats (1st Frozen Four)
- Winning coach: Bob Johnson (2nd title)
- MOP: Julian Baretta (Wisconsin)
- Attendance: 25,694

The 1977 NCAA Division I men's ice hockey tournament was the culmination of the 1976–77 NCAA Division I men's ice hockey season, the 30th such tournament in NCAA history. It was held between March 20 and 26, 1977, and concluded with Wisconsin defeating Michigan 6–5 in overtime. The first-round game were held at the home team venue while all succeeding games were played at the Olympia Stadium in Detroit, Michigan.

For the first time the tournament was expanded beyond 4 teams. The NCAA selection committee granted themselves the ability to add an additional 4 teams to the tournament beyond the two tournament finalists from both the ECAC and WCHA.

== Qualifying teams ==
The NCAA gave four teams automatic bids into the tournament. The two ECAC teams that reached the ECAC tournament final received bids as did the two WCHA teams that reached their tournament championship. The NCAA also had the ability to add up to 4 additional teams as it saw fit and chose to include the CCHA tournament champion as well.

East							West						
Seed	School	Conference	Record	Berth type	Appearance	Last bid	Seed	School	Conference	Record	Berth type	Appearance	Last bid
1	Boston University	ECAC Hockey	21–10–1	Tournament champion	12th	1976	1	Wisconsin	WCHA	35–7–1	Tournament champion	4th	1973
2	New Hampshire	ECAC Hockey	27–10–0	Tournament finalist	1st	Never	2	Michigan	WCHA	26–16–0	Tournament finalist	13th	1964
							At-Large						
							Seed	School	Conference	Record	Berth type	Appearance	Last bid
							A	Bowling Green	CCHA	28–10–0	Tournament champion	1st	Never

== Format ==
The four automatic qualifiers were seeded according to pre-tournament finish. The ECAC champion was seeded as the top eastern team while the WCHA champion was given the top western seed. The second eastern seed was slotted to play the top western seed and vice versa. Because an at-large bid was offered to a western school they were placed in a first-round game with the second western seed to determine the final semifinalist. The first-round game was played at the home venue of the second seed while all succeeding games were played at the Olympia in Detroit, Michigan. All matches were Single-game eliminations with the semifinal winners advancing to the national championship game and the losers playing in a consolation game.

== Bracket ==
First Round; March 20
W2	Michigan	7
A	Bowling Green	5

Semifinals; March 24–25
E1	Boston University	4
W2	Michigan	6
W1	Wisconsin	4*
E2	New Hampshire	3

National Championship; March 26
W2	Michigan	5
W1	Wisconsin	6*
Third Place Game
E1	Boston University	6
E2	New Hampshire	5

Note: * denotes overtime period(s)

== Results ==
=== First Round ===
March 20, 1977; 7:30 pm	(W2) Michigan	7–5 (5–1, 1–0, 1–4)	(A) Bowling Green	Yost Ice Arena; Attendance: 3,895

Game reference

Rick Palmer
Goalies
Mike Liut (out 17:53)
Al Sarachman (in 17:53)
Referees:
Duane Marcus
Red Wilkie

(Hoene, Kawa) Rob Palmer – 03:11	1 – 0
	1 – 1	07:54 – PP Dave Easton (unassisted)
(Maurer) Kris Manery – PP – 12:24	2 – 1
(Debol, Rob Palmer) Bill Thayer – PP – 12:42	3 – 1
(Debol, Waymann) Doug Todd – 16:22	4 – 1
(Maurer, Manery) Bill Thayer – 17:36	5 – 1
(Debol, Rob Palmer) Dan Lerg – GW PP – 28:44	6 – 1
	6 – 2	44:14 – Byron Shutt (Cotter)
(Maurer, Debol) Dan Lerg – PP – 55:11	7 – 2
	7 – 3	57:23 – PP – Tom Newton (Mavity, Murphy)
	7 – 4	59:05 – PP – Paul Titanic (Markell, Mavity)
	7 – 5	59:59 – Tom Olsen (Lozon, Pelland)

16 min
Penalties
14 min
35
Shots
32

=== Semifinals ===
March 24, 1977; 7:30 pm	(E1) Boston University	4–6 (1–2, 1–2, 2–2)	(W2) Michigan	Olympia Stadium

Game reference

Jim Craig
Goalies
Rick Palmer

(Silk, Marden) Rick Meagher – 04:04	1 – 0
	1 – 1	05:31 – Dave Debol (R. Palmer, Manery)
	1 – 2	14:26 – John Waymann (Mauer, Manery)
(R. Meagher, Marden) Dave Silk – 27:10	2 – 2
	2 – 3	29:30 – Doug Todd (Miller)
	2 – 4	29:52 – Zbigniew Kawa (Hoene, Lerg)
	2 – 5	46:46 – GW – William Thayer (Debol, Mauer)
(Eruzione, Lamby) Dave Silk – 53:44	3 – 5
(R. Meagher, Marden) Dave Silk – 57:49	4 – 5
	4 – 6	59:22 – EN – Dan Lerg (unassisted)

14 min
Penalties
10 min
29
Shots
26

March 25, 1977; 7:30 pm	(W1) Wisconsin	4–3 (OT) (2–3, 0–0, 1–0, 1–0)	(E2) New Hampshire	Olympia Stadium; Attendance: 6,522

Game reference

Julian Baretta
Goalies
Dan Magnarelli

	0 – 1	11:57 – Bruce Crowder (Burns, Powers)
	0 – 2	14:58 – Gary Burns (Langway)
(D. Lundeen, Capouch) Dave Herbst – PP – 15:36	1 – 2
	1 – 3	15:48 – Jon Fontas (unassisted)
(Mark Johnson, Grauer) Mike Meeker – 17:37	2 – 3
(unassisted) Les Grauer – 51:42	3 – 3
(unassisted) Mike Eaves – GW – 60:42	4 – 3

12 min
Penalties
18 min
43
Shots
26

=== Third Place Game ===
March 26, 1977; 2:00 pm	(E1) Boston University	6–5 (1–5, 1–0, 4–0)	(E2) New Hampshire	Olympia Stadium

Game reference

Brian Durocher
Goalies
Mark Evans

	0 – 1	00:58 – Jon Fontas (Gould, Burke)
(Bethel, T. Meagher) Bob Dudley – 01:57	1 – 1
	1 – 2	02:37 – Gary Burns (Powers, Holt)
	1 – 3	05:49 – Bob Miller (Cox, Lumley)
	1 – 4	08:32 – Barry Edgar (Surdam, Roy)
	1 – 5	10:30 – Ralph Cox (Burke, Miller)
(O'Neill, Eruzione) Rick Meagher – 31:27	2 – 5
(R. Meagher, Eruzione) Dave Silk – 41:17	3 – 5
(Fay, Silk) Rick Meagher – 46:31	4 – 5
(Eruzione, Fay) Dave Silk – 48:31	5 – 5
(unassisted) Rick Meagher – GW – 59:11	6 – 5

42
Shots
28

=== National Championship ===
March 26, 1977; 7:30 pm	(W1) Wisconsin	6–5 (OT) (3–1, 1–1, 1–3, 1–0)	(W2) Michigan	Olympia Stadium; Attendance: 14,437

Game reference
Referees: Medo Martinello; Deno Paniccia

Scoring summary
Period	Team	Goal	Assist(s)	Time	Score
1st	WIS	Steve Alley – PP	Norwich and Eaves	2:29	1–0 WIS
1st	WIS	Dave Herbst	Norwich and Lundeen	9:27	2–0 WIS
1st	WIS	Mark Johnson – PP	Eaves and Alley	15:12	3–0 WIS
1st	UM	Kip Maurer – PP	Manery and Palmer	16:13	3–1 WIS
2nd	UM	Dave Debol – PP	Maurer and Palmer	21:33	3–2 WIS
2nd	WIS	Mike Meeker	Johnson and Suter	22:54	4–2 WIS
3rd	WIS	Mark Johnson	Grauer and Meeker	41:10	5–2 WIS
3rd	UM	Mark Miller	Debol and Todd	41:36	5–3 WIS
3rd	UM	Dave Debol	Thayer	42:14	5–4 WIS
3rd	UM	John Wayman	Maurer	54:22	5–5
1st Overtime	WIS	Steve Alley – GW	Eaves and Ulseth	60:23	6–5 WIS
Penalty summary
Period	Team	Player	Penalty	Time	PIM
1st	UM	Kris Manery	Hooking	1:12	2:00
1st	WIS	Dave Herbst	Hooking	5:48	2:00
1st	UM	Dane Hoene	Tripping	15:01	2:00
1st	WIS	Murray Johnson	Elbowing	15:21	2:00
1st	WIS	Craig Norwich	High-sticking	19:20	2:00
1st	UM	John Wayman	High-sticking	19:20	2:00
2nd	WIS	Steve Alley	Hooking	20:30	2:00
2nd	WIS	Dave Herbst	Tripping	22:54	2:00
2nd	UM	Dean Turner	Interference	28:44	2:00
2nd	WIS	Bob Suter	Roughing	34:44	2:00
2nd	WIS	Craig Norwich	Roughing	37:13	2:00
3rd	WIS	Craig Norwich	High-sticking	41:55	2:00
3rd	UM	Dane Hoene	High-sticking	41:55	2:00
3rd	UM	John McCahill	Hooking	45:03	2:00
3rd	WIS	John Taft	Tripping	48:41	2:00
1st Overtime	none				

Shots by period
Team	1	2	3	OT	T
Michigan	11	13	15	0	39
Wisconsin	11	10	8	1	30

Goaltenders
Team	Name	Saves	Goals against	Time on ice
UM	Rick Palmer	24	6	
WIS	Julian Baretta	34	5	

== All-Tournament team ==
- G: Julian Baretta* (Wisconsin)
- D: Craig Norwich (Wisconsin)
- D: John Taft (Wisconsin)
- F: Dave Debol (Michigan)
- F: Rick Meagher (Boston University)
- F: Dave Silk (Boston University)

* Most Outstanding Player(s)
