= Julian Baretta =

Canadian ice hockey player (born 1957)

- Born: October 3, 1957 (age 69) Edmonton, Alberta, Canada
- Height: 5 ft 9 in (175 cm)
- Weight: 170 lb (77 kg; 12 st 2 lb)
- Position: Goaltender
- Caught: Left
- Played for: Muskegon Mohawks; Saginaw Gears; Milwaukee Admirals
- NHL draft: 84th overall, 1977; Los Angeles Kings
- WHA draft: 55th overall, 1977; Edmonton Oilers
- Playing career: 1975–1985

Julian Baretta (born October 3, 1957) is a Canadian former professional ice hockey player. He helped Wisconsin win their second National Title in 1977, earning Tournament MOP honors and winning the then-shortest overtime championship game in tournament history.

== Career ==
Baretta moved to Madison after spending parts of two seasons playing in Canada, winning a Centennial Cup in 1975 with the Spruce Grove Mets. With head coach Bob Johnson away coaching the Olympic Team the Badgers bottomed out, finishing tied for last place in the WCHA bus still manages to make the conference tournament where they were swept out by Michigan State. When Johnson returned for 1976–77 he brought several players with him including Steve Alley and John Taft, seniors who had played on the Olympic team. The infusion of offense allowed Wisconsin to put their worst season in team history (at that point) in the rearview mirror and jump out to a great start to the season. Baretta split time in net with Mike Dibble but it was the sophomore who finished the season with a 21-2 record and a 3.08 GAA, third best in the NCAA and tops in the WCHA.

Baretta paced the Badgers as they swept through the WCHA tournament, winning all 6 of their games and posted a shutout against Michigan in the championship series. As the WCHA did not name an All-Tournament Team or Tournament MVP until 1988 Baretta has to accept only being named to the All-WCHA First Team and an All-American. As the WCHA champion, Wisconsin received the top western seed and played New Hampshire in the semifinals. The two teams played into overtime and Baretta kept everying out of the net in the extra frame, allowing Mike Eaves to score the winning goals and send Wisconsin to the title tile against Michigan. Despite twice holding 3-goal leads, Michigan battled back and scored 5 times on 39 shots to tie the championship game and sent it into overtime. Steve Alley scored on the first shot of the extra frame and gave the Badgers the 1977 National Championship. Baretta was named to the All-Tournament Team and named as Most Outstanding Player.

The next year saw the Badgers take a small step back, finishing second in the WCHA, but another superlative effort from Baretta saw Wisconsin win another WCHA tournament title and make its second consecutive NCAA tournament. Unfortunately, Wisconsin ran into an angry Boston University team and the Badgers lost both of their games. Baretta made it onto the WHCA Second Team. Baretta returned for his senior season but the Badgers weren't quite up to par and finished 4th in the WCHA. Despite this they narrowly missed making the tournament, losing to #1 seed North Dakota 11-9. After graduating Baretta played just over a season in the IHL playing for three separate teams. He left the game in 1980 but resurfaced briefly in 1984-85 with HC Auronzo but didn't play in any games.

== Awards and honors ==
Award	Year
All-WCHA First Team	1976–77
AHCA West All-American	1976–77
All-NCAA All-Tournament Team	1977
All-WCHA Second Team	1977–78

Awards and achievements
Preceded by Tom Vannelli	NCAA Tournament Most Outstanding Player; 1977	Succeeded by Jack O'Callahan
