= David McNab (ice hockey) =

- Born: October 6, 1955 (age 70); Vancouver, British Columbia, Canada
- Occupation: Former senior vice president of hockey operations for the Anaheim Ducks (1993–2021)
Ice hockey career
- Position: Goaltender
- WCHA team: Wisconsin Badgers

David McNab (born October 6, 1955) is a Canadian-American former ice hockey executive who most recently served as the senior vice president of hockey operations for the Anaheim Ducks of the NHL. He spent 43 seasons in the NHL as a scout and personnel executive with four franchises before his retirement in May 2021.

== Early life ==
Born in Vancouver, British Columbia, and raised in San Diego, McNab graduated from the University of Wisconsin in 1978. He was a backup goalie on the Wisconsin Badgers during the 1977 NCAA Division I men's ice hockey tournament.

== Career ==
McNab began his NHL career as a pro scout for the Washington Capitals in 1978, and he served as a scout for the Hartford Whalers and New York Rangers before joining the Ducks as their first director of player personnel in 1993, shortly before their inaugural season. He was named an assistant general manager of the Ducks in 1995, and he was promoted to senior vice president of hockey operations in 2008, a year after Anaheim won its only Stanley Cup championship. Upon announcement of his retirement in May 2021, he holds the record as the longest serving member of the Ducks franchise upper management, working a total of 28 consecutive years in the organization.

== Personal life ==
McNab's brother, Peter, played in the NHL for 14 seasons, while his father, Max, won the Stanley Cup as a center for the Detroit Red Wings in 1950 before becoming the general manager of the New Jersey Devils and Washington Capitals.
