= 1977 WCHA men's ice hockey tournament =

1977 WCHA Men's ice hockey tournament
- Dates: March 9–17, 1977
- Teams: 8
- Finals site: Dane County Coliseum; Madison, Wisconsin
- Champions: Wisconsin (4th title)
- Winning coach: Bob Johnson (4th title)
- WCHA Men's Ice Hockey Tournaments

The 1977 WCHA Men's Ice Hockey Tournament was the 18th conference playoff in league history. The tournament was played between March 9 and March 17, 1977. All games were played at home team campus sites including the championship series. By reaching the finals both Wisconsin and Michigan were invited to participate in the 1977 NCAA Division I Men's Ice Hockey Tournament.

This was the first year that the WCHA had named one tournament champion in twelve years. After this championship the conference would revert to awarding two teams the postseason title for an additional four years.

== Format ==
The top eight teams in the WCHA, according to their final conference standings, were eligible for the tournament and were seeded No. 1 through No. 8. In the first round the first and eighth seeds, the second and seventh seeds, the third and sixth seeds and the fourth and fifth seeds were matched in two-game series where the school that scored the higher number of goals was declared the winner. After the first round the remaining teams were reseeded No. 1 through No. 4 according to their final conference standings and advanced to the second round. In the second round the first and fourth seeds and the second and third seeds competed in an additional two-game, total goal series with the winners of each advancing to the championship series, again a two-game, total goal match.

=== Conference standings ===
Note: GP = Games played; W = Wins; L = Losses; T = Ties; PTS = Points; GF = Goals For; GA = Goals Against

1976–77 Western Collegiate Hockey Association standings
	Conference							Overall					
	GP	W	L	T	PTS	GF	GA	GP	W	L	T	GF	GA
Wisconsin†*	32	26	5	1	53	192	122	45	37	7	1	264	161
Notre Dame	32	19	10	3	41	164	127	38	22	13	3	191	147
Michigan	32	20	12	0	40	183	151	45	28	17	0	260	211
Denver	32	16	14	2	34	154	151	40	21	17	2	206	187
North Dakota	32	16	16	0	32	168	158	38	19	19	0	202	184
Michigan Tech	32	15	16	1	31	143	150	38	19	18	1	177	178
Minnesota	32	13	16	3	29	135	144	41	17	21	3	177	202
Colorado College	32	11	20	1	23	156	170	40	13	25	2	194	209
Michigan State	32	11	20	1	23	122	171	36	14	21	1	145	189
Minnesota-Duluth	32	6	24	2	14	119	192	37	9	26	2	148	219
Championship: Wisconsin † indicates conference regular season champion * indicates conference tournament champion

== Bracket ==
Teams are reseeded after the first round

First Round; March 9–10
1	Wisconsin	3	3	6
8	Colorado College	1	1	2
2	Notre Dame	5	2	7
7	Minnesota	1	9	10
3	Michigan	6	5	11
6	Michigan Tech	5	2	7
4	Denver	8	7	15
5	North Dakota	3	2	5

Semifinals; March 12–13
1	Wisconsin	9	8	17
7	Minnesota	5	3	8
3	Michigan	6	11	17
4	Denver	4	4	8

Championship; March 16–17
1	Wisconsin	4	5	9
3	Michigan	0	4	4

Note: * denotes overtime period(s)

=== First round ===
==== (1) Wisconsin vs. (8) Colorado College ====
March 9	Wisconsin	3 – 1	Colorado College	Dane County Coliseum

March 10	Wisconsin	3 – 1	Colorado College	Dane County Coliseum

Wisconsin won series 6–2

==== (2) Notre Dame vs. (7) Minnesota ====
March 9	Notre Dame	5 – 1	Minnesota	Edmund P. Joyce Center

March 10	Notre Dame	2 – 9	Minnesota	Edmund P. Joyce Center

Minnesota won series 10–7

==== (3) Michigan vs. (6) Michigan Tech ====
March 9	Michigan	6 – 5	Michigan Tech	Yost Ice Arena

March 10	Michigan	5 – 2	Michigan Tech	Yost Ice Arena

Michigan won series 11–7

==== (4) Denver vs. (5) North Dakota ====
March 9	Denver	8 – 3	North Dakota	DU Arena

March 10	Denver	7 – 2	North Dakota	DU Arena

Denver won series 15–5

=== Semifinals ===
==== (1) Wisconsin vs. (7) Minnesota ====
March 12	Wisconsin	9 – 5	Minnesota	Dane County Coliseum

March 13	Wisconsin	8 – 3	Minnesota	Dane County Coliseum

Wisconsin won series 17–8

==== (3) Michigan vs. (4) Denver ====
March 12	Michigan	6 – 4	Denver	Yost Ice Arena

March 13	Michigan	11 – 4	Denver	Yost Ice Arena

Michigan won series 17–8

=== Championship ===
==== (1) Wisconsin vs. (3) Michigan ====
March 16	Wisconsin	4 – 0	Michigan	Dane County Coliseum

March 17	Wisconsin	5 – 4	Michigan	Dane County Coliseum

Wisconsin won series 9–4

== Tournament awards ==
None

== See also ==
- Western Collegiate Hockey Association men's champions
