= 1977 CCHA men's ice hockey tournament =

1977 CCHA Men's ice hockey tournament
- Dates: March 4–12, 1977
- Teams: 4
- Finals site: St. Louis Arena; St. Louis, Missouri
- Champions: Bowling Green (2nd title)
- Winning coach: Ron Mason (1st title)
- CCHA Men's Ice Hockey Tournaments

The 1977 CCHA Men's Ice Hockey Tournament was the sixth CCHA Men's Ice Hockey Tournament. It was played between March 4 and March 12, 1977. All games were played at St. Louis Arena in St. Louis, Missouri, the home venue of the St. Louis Billikens. By winning the tournament, Bowling Green received the Central Collegiate Hockey Association's first invitation to play in the NCAA Division I Tournament, a first round game created to allow entrance for the CCHA.

== Format ==
The tournament featured two rounds of play. Only the top four teams in the conference standings were eligible for postseason play. Each of the two rounds were structured so that the two teams facing one another would play two games and the winner would be decided by the goal differential totals of the combined scores. In the semifinal the first and fourth seeds and the second and third seeds were matched as opponents. The victorious teams would then compete in the finals for the conference championship. The tournament champion was invited to play in a first round game in the 1977 NCAA Division I Men's Ice Hockey Tournament.

== Conference standings ==
Note: GP = Games played; W = Wins; L = Losses; T = Ties; PTS = Points; GF = Goals For; GA = Goals Against

1976–77 Central Collegiate Hockey Association standings
	Conference							Overall					
	GP	W	L	T	PTS	GF	GA	GP	W	L	T	GF	GA
Saint Louis†	16	13	2	1	27	89	52	39	27	11	1	197	128
Bowling Green*	16	10	6	0	20	94	52	39	28	11	0	209	113
Ohio State	16	8	7	1	17	64	74	38	17	20	1	160	178
Western Michigan	16	5	11	0	10	52	79	37	17	19	1	179	180
Lake Superior State	16	3	13	0	6	56	98	33	10	23	0	139	197
Championship: Bowling Green † indicates conference regular season champion * indicates conference tournament champion

== Bracket ==
Semifinals; March 4–5
1	Saint Louis	3	11
4	Western Michigan	2	4
2	Bowling Green	5	4
3	Ohio State	2	1

Championship; March 11–12
1	Saint Louis	0	4
2	Bowling Green	4	1

Note: * denotes overtime period(s)

=== Semifinals ===
==== (1) Saint Louis vs. (4) Western Michigan ====
March 4	Saint Louis	3 – 2	Western Michigan	St. Louis Arena

March 5	Saint Louis	11 – 4	Western Michigan	St. Louis Arena

Saint Louis won series 14-6

==== (2) Bowling Green vs. (3) Ohio State ====
March 4	Bowling Green	5 – 2	Ohio State	St. Louis Arena

March 5	Bowling Green	4 – 1	Ohio State	St. Louis Arena

Bowling Green won series 9-3

=== Championship ===
==== (1) Saint Louis vs. (2) Bowling Green ====
March 11	Saint Louis	0 – 4	Bowling Green	St. Louis Arena

March 12	Saint Louis	4 – 1	Bowling Green	St. Louis Arena

Bowling Green won series 5-4

== Tournament awards ==
=== MVP ===
- None
