= Jon Fontas =

American ice hockey player (born 1955)

- Born: April 16, 1955 (age 70); Arlington, Massachusetts, U.S.
- Height: 5 ft 10 in (178 cm)
- Weight: 170 lb (77 kg; 12 st 2 lb)
- Position: Center
- Shot: Right
- Played for: Minnesota North Stars; Jokerit; SaiPa
- NHL draft: Undrafted
- Playing career: 1978–1985

Jon Paul Fontas (born April 16, 1955) is an American retired professional ice hockey player who played two games in the National Hockey League (NHL) for the Minnesota North Stars, one each in the 1979–80 and 1980–81 seasons. The rest of his career, which lasted from 1978 to 1985, was spent in the minor leagues and later in Finland.

Prior to his NHL career, Fontas played college ice hockey for the University of New Hampshire Wildcats between 1974 and 1978. He was inducted into the university's Sports Hall of Fame in 1997.

Fontas is now a coach and hockey instructor in New Hampshire.

== Career statistics ==
=== Regular season and playoffs ===
			Regular season					Playoffs
Season	Team	League	GP	G	A	Pts	PIM	GP	G	A	Pts	PIM
1973–74	Choate Rosemary Hall	HS-CT	—	—	—	—	—	—	—	—	—	—
1974–75	University of New Hampshire	ECAC	10	4	9	13	4	—	—	—	—	—
1975–76	University of New Hampshire	ECAC	31	10	23	33	41	—	—	—	—	—
1976–77	University of New Hampshire	ECAC	36	27	37	64	16	—	—	—	—	—
1977–78	University of New Hampshire	ECAC	30	31	33	64	12	—	—	—	—	—
1978–79	Saginaw Gears	IHL	79	36	45	81	32	4	2	2	4	0
1979–80	Minnesota North Stars	NHL	1	0	0	0	0	—	—	—	—	—
1979–80	Oklahoma City Stars	CHL	68	22	26	48	16	—	—	—	—	—
1980–81	Minnesota North Stars	NHL	1	0	0	0	0	—	—	—	—	—
1980–81	Oklahoma City Stars	CHL	5	1	1	2	0	—	—	—	—	—
1980–81	Baltimore Clippers	EHL	63	25	47	72	44	4	0	2	2	0
1981–82	Jokerit	FIN	36	20	23	43	51	—	—	—	—	—
1982–83	JoKP	FIN-2	36	25	34	59	57	5	4	1	5	29
1983–84	JoKP	FIN-2	36	27	36	63	24	3	1	4	5	12
1984–85	SaiPa	FIN	36	12	15	27	44	—	—	—	—	—
FIN totals			72	32	38	70	95	—	—	—	—	—
NHL totals			2	0	0	0	0	—	—	—	—	—
