= Rick Meagher =

Canadian ice hockey player (born 1953)

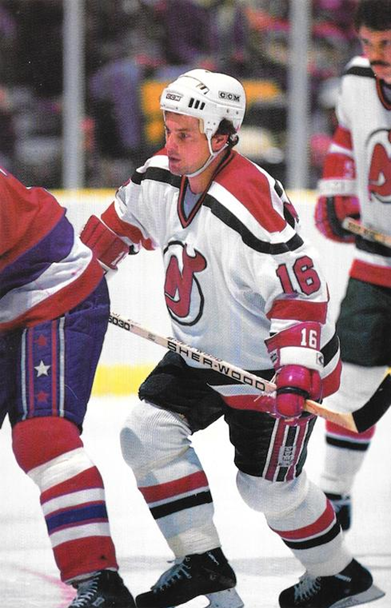
- Born: November 4, 1953 (age 72) Belleville, Ontario, Canada
- Height: 5 ft 8 in (173 cm)
- Weight: 175 lb (79 kg; 12 st 7 lb)
- Position: Centre
- Shot: Left
- Played for: AHL; Nova Scotia Voyageurs; Binghamton Whalers; Maine Mariners; NHL; Montreal Canadiens; Hartford Whalers; New Jersey Devils; St. Louis Blues
- NHL draft: Undrafted
- Playing career: 1977–1991

Richard Joseph Meagher (born November 2, 1953) is a Canadian former ice hockey player. Meagher played almost 700 games in the National Hockey League (NHL) with the Montreal Canadiens, Hartford Whalers, New Jersey Devils and St. Louis Blues. He won the Selke Trophy in 1990 with the Blues. As of 2010 he was a scout for the St. Louis Blues.

== Playing career ==
Not drafted by a National Hockey League (NHL) team, Meagher's playing career began with the Boston University Terriers. He played four seasons at Boston University, winning numerous awards, including being named to both the First and Second All-Star teams twice. Meagher was named to the NCAA East All-American team three times, and also was placed on the NCAA Championship All-Tournament Team.

In 1977–78, Meagher was signed by the Montreal Canadiens as a free agent. He spent the first three years in the American Hockey League (AHL) with the Nova Scotia Voyageurs. In 1979–80, Meagher played for the first time in the NHL, playing a total of two games for the Canadiens. The following season, Meagher was traded to the Hartford Whalers. With Hartford, he recorded 17 points in 27 games, but still played most of the season with their AHL affiliate, the Binghamton Whalers. The 1981–82 season had Meagher playing full-time in the NHL, recording 24 goals while centering a line with Don Nachbaur and Warren Miller. In 1982–83, Meagher played in only four games with the Whalers before being traded to the New Jersey Devils. Meagher played three seasons with New Jersey, until 1984–85, when he was traded to the St. Louis Blues.

It was in St. Louis that Meagher had his most productive years, playing on a line with star Bernie Federko. He was a two-way forward and a top penalty killer in the league. In 1989–90, a season in which he was also named team captain of the Blues, Meagher received the Frank J. Selke Trophy as the league's top defensive forward. After 1990–91, Meagher retired due to injuries.

== Awards and honors ==
| Award | Year |
|---|---|
| All-ECAC Hockey Second Team | 1973–74 |
| All-ECAC Hockey Second Team | 1974–75 |
| AHCA East All-American | 1974–75 |
| All-ECAC Hockey First Team | 1975–76 |
| AHCA East All-American | 1975–76 |
| All-ECAC Hockey First Team | 1976–77 |
| AHCA East All-American | 1976–77 |
| All-NCAA All-Tournament Team | 1977 |

- Metro OHA-B Rookie of the Year awards winner in 1972.
- Frank J. Selke Trophy winner in 1990.

== Career statistics ==
| | | | Regular season | | | | | Playoffs |
| Season | Team | League | GP | G | A | Pts | PIM | GP | G | A | Pts | PIM |
|---|---|---|---|---|---|---|---|---|---|---|---|---|
| 1973–74 | Boston University Terriers | ECAC | 30 | 19 | 21 | 40 | 26 | — | — | — | — | — |
| 1974–75 | Boston University Terriers | ECAC | 32 | 25 | 28 | 53 | 80 | — | — | — | — | — |
| 1975–76 | Boston University Terriers | ECAC | 28 | 12 | 25 | 37 | 22 | — | — | — | — | — |
| 1976–77 | Boston University Terriers | ECAC | 34 | 34 | 46 | 80 | 42 | — | — | — | — | — |
| 1977–78 | Nova Scotia Voyageurs | AHL | 57 | 20 | 27 | 47 | 33 | 11 | 5 | 3 | 8 | 11 |
| 1978–79 | Nova Scotia Voyageurs | AHL | 79 | 35 | 46 | 81 | 57 | 10 | 1 | 6 | 7 | 11 |
| 1979–80 | Montreal Canadiens | NHL | 2 | 0 | 0 | 0 | 0 | — | — | — | — | — |
| 1979–80 | Nova Scotia Voyageurs | AHL | 64 | 32 | 44 | 76 | 53 | 6 | 3 | 4 | 7 | 2 |
| 1980–81 | Hartford Whalers | NHL | 27 | 7 | 10 | 17 | 19 | — | — | — | — | — |
| 1980–81 | Binghamton Whalers | AHL | 50 | 23 | 25 | 58 | 54 | — | — | — | — | — |
| 1981–82 | Hartford Whalers | NHL | 65 | 24 | 19 | 43 | 51 | — | — | — | — | — |
| 1982–83 | Hartford Whalers | NHL | 4 | 0 | 0 | 0 | 0 | — | — | — | — | — |
| 1982–83 | New Jersey Devils | NHL | 57 | 15 | 14 | 29 | 11 | — | — | — | — | — |
| 1983–84 | New Jersey Devils | NHL | 52 | 14 | 14 | 28 | 16 | — | — | — | — | — |
| 1983–84 | Maine Mariners | AHL | 10 | 6 | 4 | 10 | 2 | — | — | — | — | — |
| 1984–85 | New Jersey Devils | NHL | 71 | 11 | 20 | 31 | 22 | — | — | — | — | — |
| 1985–86 | St. Louis Blues | NHL | 79 | 11 | 19 | 30 | 28 | 19 | 4 | 4 | 8 | 12 |
| 1986–87 | St. Louis Blues | NHL | 80 | 18 | 21 | 39 | 54 | 6 | 0 | 0 | 0 | 11 |
| 1987–88 | St. Louis Blues | NHL | 76 | 18 | 16 | 34 | 76 | 10 | 0 | 0 | 0 | 8 |
| 1988–89 | St. Louis Blues | NHL | 78 | 15 | 14 | 29 | 53 | 10 | 3 | 2 | 5 | 6 |
| 1989–90 | St. Louis Blues | NHL | 76 | 8 | 17 | 25 | 47 | 8 | 1 | 0 | 1 | 2 |
| 1990–91 | St. Louis Blues | NHL | 24 | 3 | 1 | 4 | 6 | 9 | 0 | 1 | 1 | 2 |
| NHL totals | | | 691 | 144 | 165 | 309 | 383 | 62 | 8 | 7 | 15 | 41 |

Awards and achievements
| Preceded by Ed Walsh; Terry Meagher | ECAC Hockey Most Outstanding Player in Tournament; 1975; 1977 | Succeeded by Terry Meagher; Joe Mullen |
Sporting positions
| Preceded by Bernie Federko | St. Louis Blues captain 1989–90 | Succeeded by Scott Stevens |
| Preceded by Guy Carbonneau | Frank J. Selke Trophy winner 1990 | Succeeded by Dirk Graham |
