= Jack Hughes (ice hockey, born 1957) =

American ice hockey player

- Born: July 20, 1957 (age 68) Somerville, Massachusetts, U.S.
- Height: 6 ft 1 in (185 cm)
- Weight: 205 lb (93 kg; 14 st 9 lb)
- Position: Defense
- Shot: Right
- Played for: Colorado Rockies
- National team: United States
- NHL draft: 142nd overall, 1977; Colorado Rockies
- Playing career: 1979–1982

Jon Francis "Jack" Hughes (born July 20, 1957) is an American former professional ice hockey defenseman who played 46 games in the National Hockey League for the Colorado Rockies. He played with the American national team during the 1979–80 season, but was cut before they played at the Olympics. The team would end up playing in the Miracle on Ice and won the gold medal. Coincidentally, at the 2026 Winter Olympics, 46 years to the day of the Miracle, Jack Hughes (no relation) scored the game winning goal to beat Canada to win the Gold medal.

== Regular season and playoffs ==
			Regular season					Playoffs
Season	Team	League	GP	G	A	Pts	PIM	GP	G	A	Pts	PIM
1975–76	Choate Rosemary Hall	HS-CT	—	—	—	—	—	—	—	—	—	—
1976–77	Harvard University	ECAC	26	5	16	21	16	—	—	—	—	—
1977–78	Harvard University	ECAC	23	8	19	27	33	—	—	—	—	—
1978–79	Harvard University	ECAC	25	3	29	32	51	—	—	—	—	—
1979–80	United States National Team	Intl	49	3	15	18	62	—	—	—	—	—
1979–80	Fort Worth Texans	CHL	29	1	7	8	70	15	1	11	12	40
1980–81	Colorado Rockies	NHL	38	2	5	7	91	—	—	—	—	—
1980–81	Fort Worth Texans	CHL	27	1	7	8	36	5	0	5	5	16
1981–82	Colorado Rockies	NHL	8	0	0	0	13	—	—	—	—	—
1981–82	Fort Worth Texans	CHL	65	7	25	32	158	—	—	—	—	—
NHL totals			46	2	5	7	104	—	—	—	—	—

== Awards and honors ==
Award	Year
All-ECAC Hockey First Team	1976–77
All-ECAC Hockey Second Team	1977–78

Awards and achievements
Preceded by Paul Skidmore	ECAC Hockey Rookie of the Year; 1976–77	Succeeded by Mark Fidler
