= Paul Skidmore =

American ice hockey player (born 1956)

- Born: July 22, 1956 (age 69) Smithtown, New York, U.S.
- Height: 6 ft 0 in (183 cm)
- Weight: 180 lb (82 kg; 12 st 12 lb)
- Position: Goaltender
- Caught: Right
- Played for: St. Louis Blues
- NHL draft: 61st overall, 1976; St. Louis Blues
- WHA draft: 73rd overall, 1976; Cincinnati Stingers
- Playing career: 1979–1985

Paul Skidmore (born July 22, 1956) is an American former professional ice hockey goaltender. He played two games in the National Hockey League for the St. Louis Blues during the 1981–82 season. The rest of his career, which lasted from 1979 to 1985, was spent in the minor leagues.

== Career statistics ==
=== Regular season and playoffs ===
			Regular season									Playoffs
Season	Team	League	GP	W	L	T	MIN	GA	SO	GAA	SV%	GP	W	L	MIN	GA	SO	GAA	SV%
1970–71	Long Island Ducklings	NYJHL	—	—	—	—	—	—	—	—	—	—	—	—	—	—	—	—	—
1971–72	Suffolk Ducks	NYJHL	30	—	—	—	1800	134	1	4.47	—	—	—	—	—	—	—	—	—
1972–73	Suffolk Ducks	NYJHL	37	—	—	—	2179	142	2	3.91	—	—	—	—	—	—	—	—	—
1973–74	Suffolk Ducks	NYJHL	12	—	—	—	819	46	3	3.37	—	—	—	—	—	—	—	—	—
1974–75	Suffolk Ducks	NYJHL	11	—	—	—	660	36	0	3.27	—	—	—	—	—	—	—	—	—
1975–76	Boston College	ECAC	27	13	10	1	1500	105	0	4.20	—	—	—	—	—	—	—	—	—
1976–77	Boston College	ECAC	25	15	9	1	1510	105	1	4.17	—	—	—	—	—	—	—	—	—
1977–78	Boston College	ECAC	25	18	7	0	1417	88	2	3.73	—	—	—	—	—	—	—	—	—
1978–79	Boston College	ECAC	18	8	9	0	1039	95	0	5.49	—	—	—	—	—	—	—	—	—
1979–80	Port Huron Flags	IHL	36	—	—	—	2138	131	2	3.68	—	1	0	0	31	5	0	9.62	—
1980–81	Salt Lake Golden Eagles	CHL	40	24	14	2	2414	150	1	3.73	.873	—	—	—	—	—	—	—	—
1981–82	St. Louis Blues	NHL	2	1	1	0	120	6	0	2.32	.878	—	—	—	—	—	—	—	—
1981–82	Salt Lake Golden Eagles	CHL	50	21	27	1	2996	192	3	3.85	.875	10	5	5	640	46	0	4.31	—
1982–83	Salt Lake Golden Eagles	CHL	40	21	19	0	2414	155	3	3.85	.878	3	0	1	120	14	0	7.00	—
1983–84	Montana Magic	CHL	1	0	1	0	60	8	0	8.00	—	—	—	—	—	—	—	—	—
1983–84	Carolina Thunderbirds	ACHL	29	—	—	—	1621	112	0	4.15	.832	—	—	—	—	—	—	—	—
1984–85	Salt Lake Golden Eagles	IHL	1	0	1	0	40	5	0	7.50	—	—	—	—	—	—	—	—	—
NHL totals			2	1	1	0	120	6	0	3.00	.878	—	—	—	—	—	—	—	—

== Awards and honors ==
Award	Year
All-ECAC Hockey Second Team	1975–76; 1976–77
All-NCAA All-Tournament Team	1978

Awards and achievements
Preceded by Bob Miller	ECAC Hockey Rookie of the Year; 1975–76	Succeeded by Jack Hughes
