= 1977 ECAC Hockey men's ice hockey tournament =

1977 ECAC Men's ice hockey tournament
- Dates: March 8–12, 1977
- Teams: 8
- Finals site: Boston Garden; Boston, Massachusetts
- Champions: Boston University (5th title)
- Winning coach: Jack Parker (4th title)
- MVP: Rick Meagher (Boston University)
- ECAC Men's Ice Hockey Tournaments

The 1977 ECAC Hockey Men's Ice Hockey Tournament was the 16th tournament in league history. It was played between March 8 and March 12, 1977. Quarterfinal games were played at home team campus sites, while the 'final four' games were played at the Boston Garden in Boston, Massachusetts. By reaching the championship game both, Boston University and New Hampshire received invitations to participate in the 1977 NCAA Division I Men's Ice Hockey Tournament.

== Format ==
The tournament featured three rounds of play, all of which were single-elimination. The top eight teams, based on winning percentage, qualified to participate in the tournament. In the quarterfinals the first seed and eighth seed, the second seed and seventh seed, the third seed and sixth seed and the fourth seed and fifth seed played against one another. In the semifinals, the highest seed plays the lowest remaining seed while the two remaining teams play with the winners advancing to the championship game and the losers advancing to the third place game.

== Conference standings ==
Note: GP = Games played; W = Wins; L = Losses; T = Ties; Pct. = Winning percentage; GF = Goals for; GA = Goals against

1976–77 ECAC Hockey standings
	Conference							Overall					
	GP	W	L	T	Pct.	GF	GA	GP	W	L	T	GF	GA
Clarkson†	23	19	4	0	.826	146	87	34	26	8	0	222	127
New Hampshire	27	21	6	0	.778	182	121	39	27	12	0	245	181
Cornell	23	16	6	1	.717	160	102	29	20	8	1	204	134
Boston University*	24	16	7	1	.688	142	110	34	22	11	1	198	160
Boston College	23	13	9	1	.587	125	106	30	18	11	1	174	130
Rensselaer	24	14	10	0	.583	138	131	30	17	12	1	184	168
Brown	21	12	9	0	.571	121	95	27	16	11	0	145	118
Providence	25	14	11	0	.560	124	105	30	17	13	0	146	128
Harvard	22	12	10	0	.545	92	78	26	14	12	0	108	95
Dartmouth	24	11	12	1	.479	136	118	26	12	12	2	146	124
Vermont	23	10	13	0	.435	105	103	30	15	15	0	141	122
Colgate	24	10	14	0	.417	110	144	28	12	16	0	128	170
Northeastern	22	9	13	0	.409	92	125	27	11	16	0	121	141
Pennsylvania	24	7	17	0	.292	93	148	26	9	17	0	105	157
Yale	23	5	17	1	.239	73	130	25	6	18	1	84	140
St. Lawrence	20	3	17	0	.150	86	147	28	8	20	0	134	182
Princeton	24	3	20	1	.146	70	143	25	3	21	1	72	150
Championship: Boston University † indicates conference regular season champion * indicates conference tournament champion

== Bracket ==
Teams are reseeded after the first round

Quarterfinals; March 8
1	Clarkson	6
8	Providence	3
2	New Hampshire	4*
7	Brown	3
3	Cornell	7
6	Rensselaer	5
4	Boston University	8
5	Boston College	7

Semifinals; March 11
1	Clarkson	6
4	Boston University	7
2	New Hampshire	10**
3	Cornell	9

Championship; March 12
2	New Hampshire	6
4	Boston University	8
Third Place
1	Clarkson	4
3	Cornell	5

Note: * denotes overtime period(s)

=== Quarterfinals ===
==== (1) Clarkson vs. (8) Providence ====
March 8	Clarkson	6 – 3	Providence	Walker Arena

==== (2) New Hampshire vs. (7) Brown ====
March 8	New Hampshire	4 – 3	OT	Brown	Snively Arena

==== (3) Cornell vs. (6) Rensselaer ====
March 8	Cornell	7 – 5	Rensselaer	Lynah Rink

==== (4) Boston University vs. (5) Boston College ====
March 8	Boston University	8 – 7	Boston College	Walter Brown Arena

=== Semifinals ===
==== (1) Clarkson vs. (4) Boston University ====
March 11	Clarkson	6 – 7	Boston University	Boston Garden

==== (2) New Hampshire vs. (3) Cornell ====
March 11	New Hampshire	10 – 9	2OT	Cornell	Boston Garden

=== Third Place ===
==== (1) Clarkson vs. (3) Cornell ====
March 12	Clarkson	4 – 5	Cornell	Boston Garden

=== Championship ===
==== (2) New Hampshire vs. (4) Boston University ====
March 12	New Hampshire	6 – 8	Boston University	Boston Garden

== Tournament awards ==
=== All-Tournament Team ===
None

=== MOP ===
- Rick Meagher (Boston University)
