= Bob Miller (ice hockey) =

American ice hockey player (1956–2020)

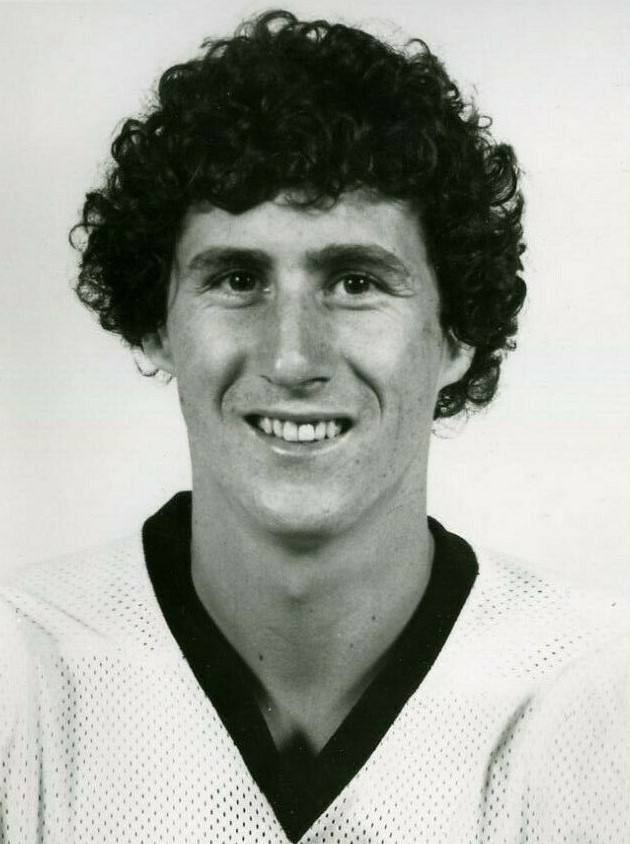
- Born: September 28, 1956 Medford, Massachusetts, U.S.
- Died: September 30, 2020 (aged 64) Tampa, Florida, U.S.
- Height: 5 ft 10 in (178 cm)
- Weight: 174 lb (79 kg; 12 st 6 lb)
- Position: Center
- Shot: Left
- Played for: Boston Bruins; Colorado Rockies; Los Angeles Kings
- National team: United States
- NHL draft: 70th overall, 1976; Boston Bruins
- WHA draft: 51st overall, 1976; Cleveland Crusaders
- Playing career: 1977–1986

Robert Michael Miller (September 28, 1956 – September 30, 2020) was an American professional ice hockey player who played 404 games in the National Hockey League between 1977 and 1985. He played for the Boston Bruins, Colorado Rockies, Los Angeles Kings. He featured in the 1978 Stanley Cup Finals with the Bruins. Miller also played in the SM-liiga in Finland for Kärpät and the Nationalliga A in Switzerland for HC Sierre.

== Early life ==
Miller was born in Medford, Massachusetts. He was a high school hockey star for St. John's Preparatory School, Billerica High, a college hockey star for the University of New Hampshire as well as the U.S. national team at the 1976 Winter Olympics before turning professional.

== Career ==
Miller was a member of the U.S. team at the 1981 Canada Cup and 1977, 1981, 1982, 1985 Ice Hockey World Championship tournaments.

During Miller's rookie season with the Boston Bruins (1977–78), he was one of 11 Bruins to score 20 goals, a record which has not been equaled by any other NHL team. Miller was present for the ceremony in 2018 when the Bruins celebrated the 40th anniversary of the achievement.

== Personal life ==
Miller is the older brother of Paul Miller. He died on September 30, 2020, in Tampa, Florida.

== Career statistics ==
=== Regular season and playoffs ===
			Regular season					Playoffs
Season	Team	League	GP	G	A	Pts	PIM	GP	G	A	Pts	PIM
1973–74	Billerica High School	HS-MA	—	—	—	—	—	—	—	—	—	—
1974–75	University of New Hampshire	ECAC	27	21	38	59	26	—	—	—	—	—
1975–76	Ottawa 67s	OMJHL	6	5	5	10	5	12	2	4	6	9
1975–76	United States National Team	Intl	63	33	61	94	83	—	—	—	—	—
1976–77	University of New Hampshire	ECAC	38	30	59	89	45	—	—	—	—	—
1977–78	Boston Bruins	NHL	76	20	20	40	41	13	0	3	3	15
1977–78	Rochester Americans	AHL	3	1	3	4	7	—	—	—	—	—
1978–79	Boston Bruins	NHL	77	15	33	48	30	11	1	1	2	8
1979–80	Boston Bruins	NHL	80	16	25	41	53	10	3	2	5	4
1980–81	Boston Bruins	NHL	30	4	4	8	19	—	—	—	—	—
1980–81	Springfield Indians	AHL	3	1	2	3	0	—	—	—	—	—
1980–81	Colorado Rockies	NHL	22	5	1	6	15	—	—	—	—	—
1981–82	Colorado Rockies	NHL	56	11	20	31	27	—	—	—	—	—
1981–82	Fort Worth Texans	CHL	20	9	8	17	17	—	—	—	—	—
1982–83	Springfield Indians	AHL	59	17	31	48	60	—	—	—	—	—
1983–84	Kärpät	FIN	37	17	31	48	66	9	5	4	9	20
1984–85	Los Angeles Kings	NHL	63	4	16	20	35	2	0	1	1	0
1985–86	HC Sierre	NLA	35	36	37	73	33	3	3	0	3	2
1986–87	HC Sierre	NLA	4	2	8	10	0	—	—	—	—	—
NHL totals			404	75	119	194	220	36	4	7	11	27

=== International ===
Year	Team	Event	GP	G	A	Pts	PIM
1976	United States	OLY	6	0	3	3	0
1977	United States	WC	10	5	3	8	4
1981	United States	WC	8	5	4	9	4
1981	United States	CC	6	0	1	1	6
1982	United States	WC	7	3	1	4	4
1985	United States	WC	10	1	6	7	2
Senior totals			47	14	18	32	20

== Awards and honors ==
Award	Year
All-ECAC Hockey First Team	1976–77
AHCA East All-American	1976–77

Awards and achievements
Preceded by Ron Wilson	ECAC Hockey Rookie of the Year; 1974–75	Succeeded by Paul Skidmore
