= Ralph Cox =

American ice hockey player

- Born: February 27, 1957 (age 69) Braintree, Massachusetts, U.S.
- Height: 5 ft 11 in (180 cm)
- Weight: 185 lb (84 kg; 13 st 3 lb)
- Position: Centre
- Shot: Right
- Played for: Tulsa Oilers (CHL); Binghamton Dusters (AHL); Muskegon Mohawks (IHL); SaiPa (SM-liiga); Klagenfurter AC (Austria); New Haven Nighthawks (AHL); Rapperswil (NLB)
- National team: United States
- NHL draft: 122nd overall, 1977; Boston Bruins
- Playing career: 1979–1986

Ralph Cox (born February 27, 1957) is an American former professional ice hockey player. He was selected by the Boston Bruins in the 7th round (122nd overall) of the 1977 NHL entry draft.

Cox played his high school hockey at Archbishop Williams High School in Braintree, Massachusetts, USA and is one of the best players in program history. Cox then played NCAA hockey with the New Hampshire Wildcats men's ice hockey team. He was NCAA First-Team All-Conference in 1978–79 and ECAC Hockey Player of the Year in 1979. Cox was the team's leading goal-scorer for three consecutive years and is the only University of New Hampshire player to ever score 40 goals in two different seasons. He was the last player cut from the famed 1980 Mens Olympic Hockey Team that won the gold medal at Lake Placid, with head coach Herb Brooks citing the lingering effects of Cox's recent ankle injury as the reason.

Cox was inducted into the New Hampshire Athletics Hall of Fame in 1986. He then joined the Pittsburgh Penguins (as general managed by Craig Patrick, the assistant coach on the 1980 Miracle team) as a scout, where he received two Stanley Cup rings (in 1991 and 1992), and had his name officially engraved on the Stanley Cup in 1992.

== Personal life ==
Cox is the father of three children: Brian, Delia, and Dylan.

== In film ==
In the 1981 television movie Miracle on Ice, the character of Ralph Cox is played by actor Brian Mozur. A more accurate portrayal of Cox is presented by Canadian actor Kenneth Mitchell in the 2004 Disney film Miracle.

== Career statistics ==
			Regular season					Playoffs
Season	Team	League	GP	G	A	Pts	PIM	GP	G	A	Pts	PIM
1975–76	University of New Hampshire	NCAA	29	14	9	23	32	—	—	—	—	—
1976–77	University of New Hampshire	NCAA	37	40	36	76	50	—	—	—	—	—
1977–78	University of New Hampshire	NCAA	30	31	39	70	44	—	—	—	—	—
1978–79	University of New Hampshire	NCAA	32	42	32	74	59	—	—	—	—	—
1979–80	Tulsa Oilers	CHL	10	2	2	4	9	—	—	—	—	—
1979–80	Binghamton Dusters	AHL	7	0	1	1	0	—	—	—	—	—
1980–81	Muskegon Mohawks	IHL	7	2	3	5	0	—	—	—	—	—
1980–81	Tulsa Oilers	CHL	5	1	2	3	2	—	—	—	—	—
1981–82	SaiPa	Liiga	33	23	28	51	89	—	—	—	—	—
1982–83	SaiPa	Liiga	32	23	12	35	80	2	0	2	2	18
1983–84	Klagenfurter AC	Austria	38	38	24	62	50	—	—	—	—	—
1983–84	New Haven Nighthawks	AHL	3	0	0	0	0	—	—	—	—	—
1984–85	SaiPa	Liiga	34	24	16	40	43	—	—	—	—	—
1985–86	SC Rapperswil-Jona	NLB	2	2	1	3	11	—	—	—	—	—
Liiga totals			99	70	56	126	212	2	0	2	2	18

== Awards and honors ==
Award	Year
All-ECAC Hockey First Team	1977–78
AHCA East All-American	1977–78
All-ECAC Hockey First Team	1978–79
AHCA East All-American	1978–79

Awards and achievements
Preceded by Lance Nethery	ECAC Hockey Player of the Year; 1978–79	Succeeded by Craig Homola
