= Rob Palmer (ice hockey, born 1956) =

Canadian ice hockey player (1956–2023)

- Born: September 10, 1956 Sarnia, Ontario, Canada
- Died: June 26, 2023 (aged 66)
- Height: 5 ft 11 in (180 cm)
- Weight: 190 lb (86 kg; 13 st 8 lb)
- Position: Defence
- Shot: Right
- Played for: Los Angeles Kings; New Jersey Devils
- NHL draft: 85th overall, 1976; Los Angeles Kings
- WHA draft: 102nd overall, 1976; Calgary Cowboys
- Playing career: 1977–1986

Robert Ross Palmer (September 10, 1956 – June 26, 2023) was a Canadian professional ice hockey defenceman who played 320 games in the National Hockey League with the Los Angeles Kings and New Jersey Devils between 1977 and 1984. As a youth, he played in the 1968 and 1969 Quebec International Pee-Wee Hockey Tournaments with minor ice hockey teams from Toronto.

== Career statistics ==
=== Regular season and playoffs ===
			Regular season					Playoffs
Season	Team	League	GP	G	A	Pts	PIM	GP	G	A	Pts	PIM
1973–74	University of Michigan	CCHA	36	3	12	15	14	—	—	—	—	—
1974–75	University of Michigan	CCHA	40	5	15	20	26	—	—	—	—	—
1975–76	University of Michigan	CCHA	42	5	16	21	58	—	—	—	—	—
1976–77	University of Michigan	CCHA	45	5	37	42	32	—	—	—	—	—
1976–77	Fort Worth Texans	CHL	3	0	2	2	0	5	0	0	0	0
1977–78	Los Angeles Kings	NHL	48	0	3	3	27	2	0	0	0	0
1977–78	Springfield Indians	AHL	19	1	7	8	18	—	—	—	—	—
1978–79	Los Angeles Kings	NHL	78	4	41	45	26	2	0	0	0	2
1979–80	Los Angeles Kings	NHL	78	4	36	40	18	4	1	2	3	4
1980–81	Los Angeles Kings	NHL	13	0	4	4	13	—	—	—	—	—
1980–81	Houston Apollos	CHL	28	3	10	13	23	—	—	—	—	—
1980–81	Indianapolis Checkers	CHL	27	1	9	10	16	5	1	1	2	0
1981–82	Los Angeles Kings	NHL	5	0	2	2	0	—	—	—	—	—
1981–82	New Haven Nighthawks	AHL	41	2	23	25	22	4	1	4	5	2
1982–83	New Jersey Devils	NHL	60	1	10	11	21	—	—	—	—	—
1983–84	New Jersey Devils	NHL	38	0	5	5	10	—	—	—	—	—
1983–84	Maine Mariners	AHL	33	5	10	15	10	17	3	10	13	8
1984–85	Maine Mariners	AHL	79	1	23	24	22	11	0	3	3	2
1985–86	Maine Mariners	AHL	73	2	10	12	18	5	0	0	0	0
NHL totals			320	9	101	110	115	8	1	2	3	6
