= Mike Meeker =

Canadian ice hockey player (1958–2024)

- Born: February 23, 1958 Kingston, Ontario, Canada
- Died: June 5, 2024 (aged 66) Gore Bay, Ontario, Canada
- Height: 5 ft 11 in (180 cm)
- Weight: 194 lb (88 kg; 13 st 12 lb)
- Position: Center
- Shot: Right
- Played for: Pittsburgh Penguins
- NHL draft: 25th overall, 1978; Pittsburgh Penguins
- Playing career: 1975–1983

Michael Thomas Meeker (February 23, 1958 – June 5, 2024) was a Canadian professional ice hockey center who played four games in the National Hockey League for the Pittsburgh Penguins during the 1978–79 season.

== Career statistics ==
=== Regular season and playoffs ===
			Regular season					Playoffs
Season	Team	League	GP	G	A	Pts	PIM	GP	G	A	Pts	PIM
1974–75	Nepean Raiders	CJHL	50	46	48	94	—	—	—	—	—	—
1975–76	University of Wisconsin–Madison	WCHA	31	12	9	21	31	—	—	—	—	—
1976–77	University of Wisconsin–Madison	WCHA	41	26	27	53	50	—	—	—	—	—
1977–78	University of Wisconsin–Madison	WCHA	4	6	2	8	4	—	—	—	—	—
1977–78	Peterborough Petes	OMJHL	44	33	36	69	21	16	6	7	13	17
1977–78	Peterborough Petes	M-Cup	—	—	—	—	—	5	2	4	6	0
1978–79	Pittsburgh Penguins	NHL	4	0	0	0	5	—	—	—	—	—
1978–79	Binghamton Dusters	AHL	75	30	35	65	70	—	—	—	—	—
1981–82	Karlskrona IK	SWE-2	20	17	9	26	32	—	—	—	—	—
1982–83	Karlskrona IK	SWE-2	17	19	7	26	17	—	—	—	—	—
NHL totals			4	0	0	0	5	—	—	—	—	—
