= Craig Norwich =

American ice hockey player

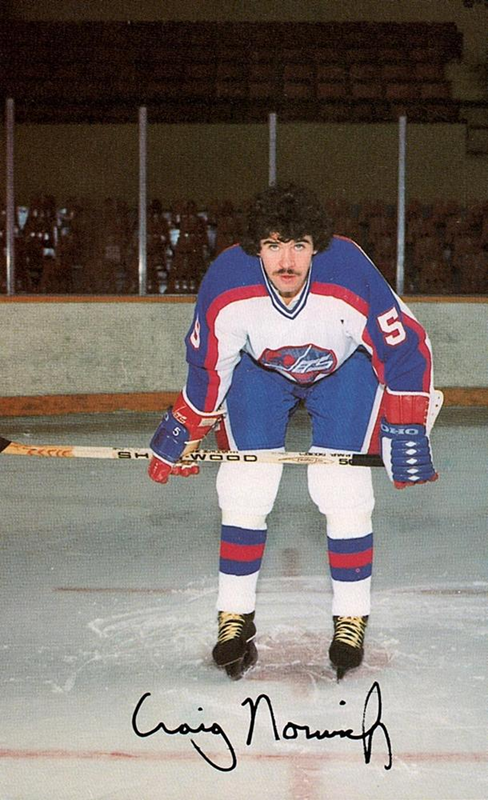
- Norwich in 1979 photo
- Born: December 15, 1955 (age 70) Edina, Minnesota, U.S.
- Height: 5 ft 11 in (180 cm)
- Weight: 176 lb (80 kg; 12 st 8 lb)
- Position: Defense
- Shot: Right
- Played for: HC Fassa; HC Gherdëina; Colorado Rockies; St. Louis Blues; Winnipeg Jets; Cincinnati Stingers
- National team: United States
- NHL draft: 142nd overall, 1975; Montreal Canadiens
- WHA draft: 184th overall, 1974; Houston Aeros
- Playing career: 1977–1987

Craig Richard Norwich (born December 15, 1955) is an American former professional ice hockey player. Norwich led the Edina East High School hockey team to the prestigious Minnesota State High School League Hockey Tournament three times, including captaining the 1974 championship team. In college, Norwich became the second defenseman in NCAA history to lead his team in scoring and win the NCAA Championship in the same season. As a professional he played in 145 games with the Cincinnati Stingers of the World Hockey Association and 104 games in the National Hockey League (NHL) with the Colorado Rockies, Winnipeg Jets, and St. Louis Blues.

== Playing career ==
Norwich played three years at the University of Wisconsin. After scoring 45 points in 38 games as a freshman in 1974-75, Norwich was chosen 142nd overall by the Montreal Canadiens at the Amateur Draft. He finished with 168 career points during his college career and was named to the WCHA second all-star team in 1976 and the first team the next year. After helping the Badgers win the NCAA title in 1977, he was named to the championship tournament all-star team.

The talented blueliner opted to join the Cincinnati Stingers of the WHA where he could play regularly rather than try to break into the Habs' deep roster. He scored 87 points in two years for Cincinnati and was a member of the US team that finished sixth at the 1978 World Championships.

On June 9, 1979, Norwich was claimed by the Winnipeg Jets in the WHA Dispersal Draft. He remained with the team when it joined the NHL in 1979-80 and was an offensive force from the blueline. A highlight for him that season was scoring two goals when the Jets earned their first NHL win, 4-2 over the Colorado Rockies. Norwich registered 45 points and scored seven power play goals on the fast-skating Jets. Prior to the 1980-81 season, he was traded to the St. Louis Blues for defensive forward Rick Bowness. He scored 16 points in 23 games for his new club then was claimed off waivers by the Colorado Rockies. He averaged over a point per game in Denver then joined the US squad that finished fifth at the 1981 World Championships.

Norwich battled injuries and played exclusively in the AHL during the 1981-82 season. He then chose to explore his options in Europe with the Gardena Finstral club of Italy where he averaged over three points per game. He later suited up for Lausanne in Switzerland before returning to Italy with Groden and HC Fassa and played with Innsbruck, Austria in 1987-88, then Lake Como in Italy retiring in 1990 after winning the Italian Championship with Como.

== Post-playing career ==
From 1990 to 1996, Norwich was the Director of Hockey and Head Coach at Shattuck St. Mary's in Faribault, MN. He moved to Vail, CO to become the Director of Hockey and Head Coach of the Vail AAA Hockey Program. Norwich was the Director of Hockey Operations and Head Coach of the boys Varsity hockey team at St. Paul Academy and Summit School in St. Paul, MN, from 2005 until he resigned in January 2010. Norwich has also coached with the LA Junior Kings, the Minnesota Rockets AAA, and Team Midwest Tier One Hockey Program.

== Career statistics ==
=== Regular season and playoffs ===
			Regular season					Playoffs
Season	Team	League	GP	G	A	Pts	PIM	GP	G	A	Pts	PIM
1971–72	Edina High School	HS-MN	—	—	—	—	—	—	—	—	—	—
1972–73	Edina High School	HS-MN	—	—	—	—	—	—	—	—	—	—
1973–74	Edina High School	HS-MN	—	8	25	33	—	—	—	—	—	—
1974–75	University of Wisconsin	B-10	38	11	34	45	24	—	—	—	—	—
1975–76	University of Wisconsin	B-10	32	13	27	40	66	—	—	—	—	—
1976–77	University of Wisconsin	B-10	44	18	65	83	70	—	—	—	—	—
1977–78	Cincinnati Stingers	WHA	65	7	23	30	48	—	—	—	—	—
1978–79	Cincinnati Stingers	WHA	80	6	51	57	73	3	0	1	1	4
1979–80	Winnipeg Jets	NHL	70	10	35	45	36	—	—	—	—	—
1980–81	Fort Worth Texans	CHL	8	0	4	4	6	—	—	—	—	—
1980–81	St. Louis Blues	NHL	23	4	12	16	14	—	—	—	—	—
1980–81	Colorado Rockies	NHL	11	3	11	14	10	—	—	—	—	—
1981–82	Springfield Indians	AHL	28	5	9	14	26	—	—	—	—	—
1982–83	HC Gherdëina	ITA	31	35	62	97	64	—	—	—	—	—
1983–84	Lausanne HC	NLB	—	—	—	—	—	—	—	—	—	—
1984–85	HC Gherdëina	ITA	1	2	2	4	2	2	0	0	0	14
1984–85	Adirondack Red Wings	AHL	16	4	7	11	16	—	—	—	—	—
1985–86	HC Fassa	ITA	31	14	63	77	28	3	0	11	11	4
1986–87	HC Fassa	ITA	37	14	55	69	82	—	—	—	—	—
WHA totals			145	13	74	87	121	3	0	1	1	4
NHL totals			104	17	58	75	60	—	—	—	—	—

=== International ===
Year	Team	Event	GP	G	A	Pts	PIM
1978	United States	WC	10	1	2	3	2
1981	United States	WC	8	1	0	1	0
1983	United States	WC-B	7	1	6	7	0
Senior totals			25	3	8	11	2

== Awards and honors ==
Award	Year
All-WCHA Second Team	1975–76
AHCA West All-American	1975–76; 1976–77
All-WCHA First Team	1976–77
All-NCAA All-Tournament Team	1977
