= Dave Debol =

American ice hockey player (born 1956)

- Born: March 27, 1956 (age 69) St. Clair Shores, Michigan, U.S.
- Height: 5 ft 11 in (180 cm)
- Weight: 170 lb (77 kg; 12 st 2 lb)
- Position: Center
- Shot: Right
- Played for: Cincinnati Stingers; Hartford Whalers
- National team: United States
- NHL draft: 63rd overall, 1976; Chicago Black Hawks
- WHA draft: 31st overall, 1976; New England Whalers
- Playing career: 1978–1984

David C. Debol (born 27 March 1956) is an American former professional ice hockey player.

Debol played 92 games for the NHL Hartford Whalers and 68 games for the WHA Cincinnati Stingers between 1978 and 1981. He was also a member of the University of Michigan hockey team before turning professional. Debol played for the United States at the Ice Hockey World Championships in 1977, 1978 and 1981. Debol also played for the Michigan Wolverines hockey team and has been inducted into the University of Michigan Athletic Hall of Honor.

== Early life ==
Debol is native of St. Clair Shores, Michigan. As a youth, he played in the 1967 and 1968 Quebec International Pee-Wee Hockey Tournaments with a minor ice hockey team from St. Clair Shores.

== University of Michigan ==
Debol enrolled at the University of Michigan where he competed for a position on the Michigan Wolverines hockey team as a walk-on player. He made the team and became an All-American center who led the Wolverines to the finals of the NCAA's Frozen Four ice hockey championship, where they lost in overtime to Wisconsin. Debol was called "the Guy Lafleur of college hockey" and was considered the best offensive player at Michigan since Red Berenson. As a sophomore, Debol scored three goals in less than one minute to set an NCAA record. In March 1977, Debol tied Red Berenson's 14-year-old record for most goals scored in a season by a Michigan Wolverines hockey player with his 42nd goal. He finished the year with 43 goals. Debol set Michigan records for most assists in a season (56), most points in a season (99), career assists (120) and career points (222). As a senior, Debol led the WCHA in scoring with 43 goals and 56 assists.

== Professional hockey ==
Debol was highly sought after by professional hockey teams. The Chicago Black Hawks acquired his NHL rights, and the New England Whalers acquired his WHA rights. The Whalers traded Debol's rights to the Edmonton Oilers, and in December 1977, the Oilers traded negotiating rights to Debol to the Cincinnati Stingers for Dennis Sobchuk. Debol signed with the Stingers in March 1978. Playing in his rookie season, Debol had 10 goals and 27 assists when he was struck in the eye with a hockey stick in a game against Winnipeg in March 1979. The following month, Debol underwent surgery at Bethesda Hospital in Cincinnati to re-attach the flap of the retina on his left eye. Debol returned from the injury and was selected by the Hartford Whalers in the 1979 Dispersal Draft when the WHA merged with the NHL. Debol played for the Whalers from 1979 to 1981. Playing on the same team as Gordie Howe and his sons Mark and Marty, When Debol was born in 1956 in a Detroit suburb, Gordie Howe had already played ten seasons with the Detroit Red Wings, and in 1980 Debol was teammates with the 52-year-old Howe in his final NHL season. Debol had 26 goals and 26 assists in 92 games for the Whalers.

== Later years ==
After retiring as a hockey player, Debol coached high school hockey at Dexter High School in Michigan. He currently coaches college hockey at the University of Michigan–Dearborn, in the ACHA Division I ranks. Debol has also owned and operated hockey schools, including Hockey Masters in Chelsea, Michigan, and also Debol & Donnelly Skill Development.

Debol lives in Saline, and has a son and a daughter, both of whom are hockey players.

In 1996, Debol was inducted into the University of Michigan Athletic Hall of Honor.

On 10 May 2016, Debol was named the inaugural head coach of his hometown team, the St. Clair Shores Fighting Saints of the Federal Hockey League.

== Career statistics ==
=== Regular season and playoffs ===
			Regular season					Playoffs
Season	Team	League	GP	G	A	Pts	PIM	GP	G	A	Pts	PIM
1973–74	St. Clair Falcons	MNHL	—	—	—	—	—	—	—	—	—	—
1974–75	University of Michigan	B-10	33	13	18	31	0	—	—	—	—	—
1975–76	University of Michigan	B-10	42	36	22	58	22	—	—	—	—	—
1976–77	University of Michigan	B-10	45	43	56	99	40	—	—	—	—	—
1977–78	University of Michigan	B-10	36	20	38	58	26	—	—	—	—	—
1977–78	Cincinnati Stingers	WHA	9	3	2	5	2	—	—	—	—	—
1978–79	Cincinnati Stingers	WHA	59	10	27	37	9	—	—	—	—	—
1979–80	Hartford Whalers	NHL	48	12	14	26	4	3	0	0	0	0
1979–80	Springfield Indians	AHL	16	4	12	16	2	—	—	—	—	—
1979–80	Cincinnati Stingers	CHL	10	8	8	16	2	—	—	—	—	—
1980–81	Hartford Whalers	NHL	44	14	12	26	0	—	—	—	—	—
1980–81	Binghamton Whalers	AHL	18	4	11	15	0	—	—	—	—	—
1981–82	Cincinnati Tigers	CHL	50	16	24	40	6	—	—	—	—	—
1981–82	Oklahoma City Stars	CHL	21	13	15	28	2	—	—	—	—	—
1982–83	Birmingham South Stars	CHL	55	25	28	53	8	13	5	5	10	2
1983–84	EHC Wetzikon	NLB	38	56	41	97	—	—	—	—	—	—
WHA totals			68	13	29	42	11	—	—	—	—	—
NHL totals			92	26	26	52	4	3	0	0	0	0

=== International ===
Year	Team	Event	GP	G	A	Pts	PIM
1977	United States	WC	8	3	3	6	2
1978	United States	WC	10	4	4	8	0
1981	United States	WC	8	5	4	9	14
Senior totals			26	12	11	23	16

== Awards and honors ==
Award	Year
All-WCHA Second Team	1975–76
All-WCHA First Team	1976–77
AHCA West All-American	1976–77
All-NCAA All-Tournament Team	1977
