= Bob Suter =

American ice hockey player

- Born: May 16, 1957 Madison, Wisconsin, U.S.
- Died: September 9, 2014 (aged 57) Middleton, Wisconsin, U.S.
- Height: 5 ft 9 in (175 cm)
- Weight: 179 lb (81 kg; 12 st 11 lb)
- Position: Defense
- Shot: Left
- Played for: Tulsa Oilers; Nashville South Stars
- National team: United States
- NHL draft: 120th overall, 1977; Los Angeles Kings
- WHA draft: 58th overall, 1977; Birmingham Bulls
- Playing career: 1978–1982
Medal record
Men's ice hockey
Representing the United States
Olympic Games
Gold medal – first place	1980 Lake Placid	Team

Robert Allen Suter (May 16, 1957 – September 9, 2014) was an American ice hockey defenseman and member of the U.S. national team that won the gold medal at the 1980 Winter Olympics.

He was the brother of former National Hockey League (NHL) player Gary Suter and father of current NHL unrestricted free agent Ryan Suter who last played for the St. Louis Blues. Another son, Garrett, played for the University of Wisconsin–Stevens Point in the Northern Collegiate Hockey Association. His nephew Jeremy Dehner is a defenseman with most of his career spent in European professional leagues.

== Career ==
Born in Madison, Wisconsin, Suter attended Madison East High School. He played college hockey at University of Wisconsin–Madison and was a member of the 1977 NCAA hockey champion Wisconsin Badgers. He was mostly noted for his rough play, setting several Badger records for penalty minutes before leaving in 1979. He initially joined the Tulsa Oilers under a tryout contract for a few games in late 1979, but soon joined the 1980 US Olympic hockey team on a full-time basis, winning the gold medal.

Suter was selected with the 120th pick in the 1977 NHL entry draft by the Los Angeles Kings of the NHL and also 58th overall in the 1977 World Hockey Association draft by the Birmingham Bulls. He rejected Los Angeles' contract offer following the 1980 Olympics, and instead sat out 1980–81 season to become an unrestricted free agent. He came out of retirement in the spring of 1981 to play for the United States team at the 1981 Ice Hockey World Championships in Stockholm. Suter signed with the Minnesota North Stars as an unrestricted free agent in 1981, but spent the entire 1981–82 season in the Central Hockey League with the Nashville South Stars farm team. He retired in 1982 without playing a single game in the NHL.

== Post-playing career ==
Suter returned to Madison after his retirement and opened a sporting goods store called Gold Medal Sports. He also coached youth hockey in Madison after his retirement and became a part-owner and director of Capitol Ice Arena in Middleton, Wisconsin. Ten months after Suter's death, the Capitol Ice Arena was renamed in his honor and is now known as "Bob Suter's Capitol Ice Arena."

== Death ==
Suter died on September 9, 2014, of a heart attack suffered at Capitol Ice Arena. In July 2015, Capitol Ice Arena was renamed as Bob Suter's Capitol Ice Arena in his memory.

== In popular culture ==
Suter was not featured in a 1981 TV movie about the 1980 U.S. hockey team called Miracle on Ice, except in archival footage of the gold medal ceremony.

In the 2004 Disney film Miracle, he is portrayed by Pete Duffy.

== Career statistics ==
=== Regular season and playoffs ===
			Regular season					Playoffs
Season	Team	League	GP	G	A	Pts	PIM	GP	G	A	Pts	PIM
1972–73	Madison East High School	HS-WI	—	—	—	—	—	—	—	—	—	—
1973–74	Madison East High School	HS-WI	—	—	—	—	—	—	—	—	—	—
1974–75	Madison East High School	HS-WI	—	—	—	—	—	—	—	—	—	—
1975–76	University of Wisconsin	WCHA	37	3	13	16	60	—	—	—	—	—
1976–77	University of Wisconsin	WCHA	38	3	15	18	107	—	—	—	—	—
1977–78	University of Wisconsin	WCHA	42	5	20	25	105	—	—	—	—	—
1978–79	University of Wisconsin	WCHA	40	16	28	44	105	—	—	—	—	—
1978–79	Tulsa Oilers	CHL	7	0	3	3	8	—	—	—	—	—
1979–80	American National Team	Intl	31	7	11	18	61	—	—	—	—	—
1981–82	Nashville South Stars	CHL	79	12	21	33	160	3	0	2	2	11
WCHA totals			157	27	76	103	377	—	—	—	—	—

=== International ===
Year	Team	Event	GP	G	A	Pts	PIM
1980	United States	OLY	7	0	0	0	6
Senior totals			7	0	0	0	6

== Awards and achievements ==
Award	Year
All-WCHA Second Team	1978–79

- Gold medal at the 1980 Winter Olympics
