= John Taft (ice hockey) =

American ice hockey player (born 1954)

- Born: March 8, 1954 (age 72) Minneapolis, Minnesota, U.S.
- Height: 6 ft 2 in (188 cm)
- Weight: 194 lb (88 kg; 13 st 12 lb)
- Position: Defense
- Shot: Right
- Played for: Detroit Red Wings
- National team: United States
- NHL draft: 81st overall, 1974; Detroit Red Wings
- WHA draft: 120th overall, 1974; Phoenix Roadrunners
- Playing career: 1977–1983

John Philip Taft (born March 8, 1954) is an American former professional ice hockey defenseman.

== Early life ==
Taft was born in Minneapolis. Prior to turning professional, he played for the Wisconsin Badgers men's ice hockey team at the University of Wisconsin–Madison.

== Career ==
Taft played 15 games in the National Hockey League with the Detroit Red Wings in the 1978–79 season. The rest of his career, which lasted from 1977 to 1983, was spent in the minor leagues. Taft played for the American national team at the 1976 Winter Olympics, and the 1973, 1974 and 1975 World Championships.

== Personal life ==
Taft's daughter, Jenny Taft, is a reporter for Fox Sports 1.

== Career statistics ==
=== Regular season and playoffs ===
			Regular season					Playoffs
Season	Team	League	GP	G	A	Pts	PIM	GP	G	A	Pts	PIM
1971–72	Minneapolis Southwest High School	HS-MN	—	—	—	—	—	—	—	—	—	—
1972–73	University of Wisconsin-Madison	WCHA	40	9	18	27	28	—	—	—	—	—
1973–74	University of Wisconsin-Madison	WCHA	36	1	17	18	20	—	—	—	—	—
1974–75	University of Wisconsin-Madison	WCHA	38	11	17	28	22	—	—	—	—	—
1975–76	United States National Team	Intl	51	9	34	43	66	—	—	—	—	—
1976–77	University of Wisconsin-Madison	WCHA	42	15	43	58	41	—	—	—	—	—
1977–78	Kansas City Red Wings	CHL	71	5	22	27	25	—	—	—	—	—
1978–79	Detroit Red Wings	NHL	15	0	2	2	4	—	—	—	—	—
1978–79	Kansas City Red Wings	CHL	61	8	24	32	48	4	0	2	2	0
1979–80	Adirondack Red Wings	AHL	47	1	7	8	25	—	—	—	—	—
1980–81	Salt Lake Golden Eagles	CHL	68	8	19	27	68	17	1	2	3	33
1981–82	Salt Lake Golden Eagles	CHL	70	6	16	22	46	1	0	0	0	0
1982–83	Salt Lake Golden Eagles	CHL	77	5	25	30	65	6	0	0	0	8
CHL totals			347	32	106	138	252	28	1	4	5	41
NHL totals			15	0	2	2	4	—	—	—	—	—

=== International ===
Year	Team	Event	GP	G	A	Pts	PIM
1973	United States	WC-B	7	0	0	0	0
1974	United States	WC-B	7	0	1	1	0
1975	United States	WC	10	1	2	3	4
1976	United States	OLY	5	1	2	3	8
Senior totals			29	2	5	7	12

== Awards and honors ==
Award	Year
All-NCAA All-Tournament Team	1973, 1977
All-WCHA Second Team	1976–77
