= Steve Alley =

American ice hockey player

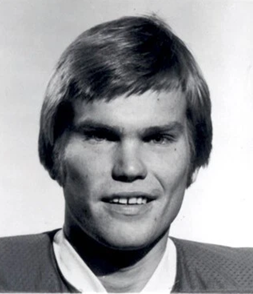
- Alley in 1978 photo
- Born: December 29, 1953 (age 72) Anoka, Minnesota, U.S.
- Height: 6 ft 0 in (183 cm)
- Weight: 185 lb (84 kg; 13 st 3 lb)
- Position: Left wing
- Shot: Left
- Played for: Birmingham Bulls (WHA); Hartford Whalers (NHL)
- National team: United States
- NHL draft: 141st overall, 1973; Chicago Blackhawks
- WHA draft: 90th overall, 1973; New England Whalers
- Playing career: 1977–1981

Steven James Alley (born December 29, 1953) is an American former professional ice hockey player who played 105 games in the World Hockey Association for the Birmingham Bulls between 1977 and 1979. He was a member of the famed "Gasline" who led Birmingham into the playoffs in 1978. He became the property of the Hartford Whalers of the National Hockey League after the WHA merged with the NHL in 1979, and made a further 18 NHL appearances in 1979–1981 before retiring from pro hockey.

Before turning professional, Alley was a member of the US National team at the 1976 Winter Olympics as well as the 1974, 1975 and 1978 Ice Hockey World Championship teams. He played for the University of Wisconsin–Madison in 1973–75, and 1976–77. Alley completed his college career by scoring the game-winning goal (23 seconds into overtime) in Wisconsin's 6-5 win over Michigan in the 1977 NCAA Division I Championship game.

Alley was a three-year letter winner in hockey at Anoka High School. As a senior, he was the leading scorer in the State of Minnesota and was selected to both the All-Conference and All-State teams. Alley was also the captain and quarterback of the football team and a three-year letter winner in baseball. The 1972 baseball team finished runner-up in the state, the best finish in Anoka High School history.

Alley and his wife Joanie live in Lake Forest, Illinois and have three daughters, Abby, Hilary, and Hannah all of whom played Division I college lacrosse. In 2001, Alley was inducted into the University of Wisconsin Athletic Hall of Fame. In September, 2011, Alley was named to the inaugural class of the Anoka High School Hall of Fame. Alley is currently president of Alley Company LLC, an investment management firm based in Lake Forest, IL.

== Career statistics ==
=== Regular season and playoffs ===
| | | | Regular season | | | | | Playoffs |
| Season | Team | League | GP | G | A | Pts | PIM | GP | G | A | Pts | PIM |
|---|---|---|---|---|---|---|---|---|---|---|---|---|
| 1971–72 | Anoka High School | HS-MN | 28 | 25 | 49 | 74 | — | — | — | — | — | — |
| 1972–73 | University of Wisconsin | B-10 | 40 | 8 | 15 | 23 | 12 | — | — | — | — | — |
| 1973–74 | University of Wisconsin | B-10 | 36 | 12 | 19 | 31 | 16 | — | — | — | — | — |
| 1974–75 | University of Wisconsin | B-10 | 38 | 23 | 25 | 48 | 84 | — | — | — | — | — |
| 1975–76 | United States National Team | Intl | 64 | 29 | 33 | 62 | 67 | — | — | — | — | — |
| 1976–77 | University of Wisconsin | B-10 | 45 | 32 | 31 | 63 | 50 | — | — | — | — | — |
| 1977–78 | Birmingham Bulls | WHA | 27 | 8 | 12 | 20 | 11 | 5 | 1 | 0 | 1 | 5 |
| 1977–78 | Hampton Gulls | AHL | 30 | 6 | 3 | 9 | 27 | — | — | — | — | — |
| 1977–78 | Springfield Indians | AHL | 1 | 0 | 0 | 0 | 0 | — | — | — | — | — |
| 1978–79 | Birmingham Bulls | WHA | 78 | 17 | 24 | 41 | 36 | — | — | — | — | — |
| 1979–80 | Hartford Whalers | NHL | 7 | 1 | 1 | 2 | 0 | 3 | 0 | 1 | 1 | 0 |
| 1979–80 | Springfield Indians | AHL | 59 | 25 | 28 | 53 | 46 | — | — | — | — | — |
| 1979–80 | Cincinnati Stingers | CHL | 10 | 3 | 6 | 9 | 12 | — | — | — | — | — |
| 1980–81 | Hartford Whalers | NHL | 8 | 2 | 2 | 4 | 11 | — | — | — | — | — |
| 1980–81 | Binghamton Whalers | AHL | 69 | 26 | 32 | 58 | 34 | 6 | 3 | 1 | 4 | 9 |
| WHA totals | | | 105 | 25 | 36 | 61 | 47 | 5 | 1 | 0 | 1 | 5 |
| NHL totals | | | 15 | 3 | 3 | 6 | 11 | 3 | 0 | 1 | 1 | 0 |

=== International ===
| Year | Team | Event | GP | G | A | Pts | PIM |
|---|---|---|---|---|---|---|---|
| 1974 | United States | WC-B | — | — | — | — | — |
| 1975 | United States | WC | 9 | 1 | 1 | 2 | 2 |
| 1976 | United States | OLY | 6 | 1 | 1 | 2 | 4 |
| 1978 | United States | WC | 3 | 0 | 0 | 0 | 0 |
| Senior totals | | | 18 | 2 | 2 | 4 | 6 |
