= Kris Manery =

Canadian ice hockey player

- Born: September 24, 1954 (age 70); Leamington, Ontario, Canada
- Height: 6 ft 0 in (183 cm)
- Weight: 180 lb (82 kg; 12 st 12 lb)
- Position: Forward
- Shot: Right
- Played for: Cleveland Barons; Minnesota North Stars; Vancouver Canucks; Winnipeg Jets
- Playing career: 1977–1985

Kris Franklin Manery (born September 24, 1954) is a Canadian former professional ice hockey player who played 250 games in the National Hockey League (NHL). He played for the Cleveland Barons, Minnesota North Stars, Vancouver Canucks, and Winnipeg Jets between 1977 and 1981.

Manery received the final second assist in Cleveland Barons' franchise history, on a goal by Dennis Maruk in the third period of Cleveland's 3–2 loss against the Pittsburgh Penguins on April 9, 1977.

Manery was born in Leamington, Ontario. He is the brother of Randy Manery.

== Career statistics ==
=== Regular season and playoffs ===
			Regular season					Playoffs
Season	Team	League	GP	G	A	Pts	PIM	GP	G	A	Pts	PIM
1972–73	Leamington Flyers	GLJHL	—	—	—	—	—	—	—	—	—	—
1973–74	University of Michigan	WCHA	36	14	14	28	36	—	—	—	—	—
1974–75	University of Michigan	WCHA	40	22	24	46	44	—	—	—	—	—
1975–76	University of Michigan	WCHA	42	37	24	61	42	—	—	—	—	—
1976–77	University of Michigan	WCHA	45	38	35	73	51	—	—	—	—	—
1977–78	Cleveland Barons	NHL	78	22	27	49	14	—	—	—	—	—
1978–79	Minnesota North Stars	NHL	60	17	19	36	16	—	—	—	—	—
1978–79	Oklahoma City Stars	CHL	13	4	4	8	6	—	—	—	—	—
1979–80	Minnesota North Stars	NHL	28	3	4	7	16	—	—	—	—	—
1979–80	Vancouver Canucks	NHL	21	2	1	3	15	—	—	—	—	—
1980–81	Winnipeg Jets	NHL	47	13	9	22	24	—	—	—	—	—
1980–81	Tulsa Oilers	CHL	22	19	13	32	12	8	5	3	8	14
1981–82	Tulsa Oilers	CHL	80	54	35	89	60	3	0	0	0	2
1982–83	EHC Chur	NLB	—	—	—	—	—	—	—	—	—	—
1983–84	Wiener EV	AUT	31	26	31	57	36	—	—	—	—	—
1983–84	EHC Kloten	NLA	—	—	—	—	—	—	—	—	—	—
1984–85	SC Rapperswil-Jona	NLB	48	36	18	54	—	—	—	—	—	—
1984–85	Binghamton Whalers	AHL	6	1	7	8	2	8	2	2	4	0
NHL totals			250	63	64	127	91	—	—	—	—	—

== Awards and honours ==
Award	Year
All-WCHA First Team	1976–77
