= Mike Eaves =

American ice hockey player and coach

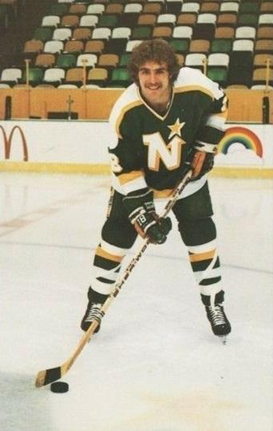
- Born: June 10, 1956 (age 70) Denver, Colorado, U.S.
- Height: 5 ft 10 in (178 cm)
- Weight: 180 lb (82 kg; 12 st 12 lb)
- Position: Centre
- Shot: Right
- Played for: Minnesota North Stars; Calgary Flames
- National team: United States
- NHL draft: 113th overall, 1976; St. Louis Blues
- Playing career: 1978–1986

Michael Gordon Eaves (born June 10, 1956) is an American former National Hockey League (NHL) player and the former head coach of the St. Olaf College men's hockey team and for his alma mater the University of Wisconsin, where he was part of two NCAA National Championship teams with the Badgers (as a player in 1977, and as head coach in 2006). In 2019, he was named the head coach of the Cleveland Monsters of the American Hockey League (AHL), a role he held until 2022.

Eaves appeared in 324 NHL regular-season games between 1978 and 1985, and has coached since 1985. His father, Cecil Eaves, is a Canadian former University of Denver ice hockey and football player and later became a professor and hockey coach at Ohio State and the University of Windsor. Eaves is also the father of former NHL forward Patrick Eaves, and former SM-Liiga Jokerit forward Ben Eaves (who is currently part of his father's coaching staff with the Monsters as strength and conditioning coach), and brother of former NHL player Murray Eaves.

== Playing career ==
=== Amateur ===
Born in Colorado, Eaves spent his early childhood in Denver and Calgary before moving to Cleveland, Ohio as a fifth and sixth grader in 1964-66 as his father Cecil was earning his doctorate at Ohio State. The family eventually settled in Ontario where Mike played junior hockey for the Nepean Raiders.

From 1974 to 1978 he played for the University of Wisconsin–Madison hockey team, where he was a two-time All-American and a member of Coach Bob Johnson's 1977 NCAA championship team. Eaves remains the Badgers' all-time leading career scorer with 267 points (94 goals, 173 assists) in 160 games. He was also a member of the United States national team at the 1976 and 1978 Ice Hockey World Championship tournaments.

He was selected 113th overall in the 1976 NHL entry draft by St. Louis, who traded his rights to the Cleveland Barons for Len Frig in 1977. Eaves ended up on the Minnesota North Stars roster after the Barons and North Stars were merged in 1978.

=== NHL years ===
Eaves turned professional following the 1977–78 season, initially joining the CHL Oklahoma City Stars, and also played 3 games with the North Stars during the year. The following year he moved up to be an NHL regular for 56 games. He then played three more consecutive seasons with Minnesota (he was also a member of Team USA at the 1981 Canada Cup tournament), before being dealt to the Calgary Flames with Keith Hanson for Steve Christoff. Chronically injury-prone, Eaves played for the Flames from 1983 to 1985, deciding to end his career at the age of 28 after sustaining a head injury at the hands of Quebec Nordiques defenseman Pat Price. Eaves was appointed to an assistant coach position with the Flames, joining Bob Johnson, his former head coach at the University of Wisconsin, behind the bench.

However, in the midst of the 1986 Stanley Cup playoffs Flames forward Carey Wilson sustained an injury, forcing him out of the lineup. Eaves was persuaded to end his retirement in order to shore up the Flames' player roster. With his family's permission he rejoined the Flames, playing 8 of their final 11 games in the playoffs. After the Flames lost in the Stanley Cup finals he ended his playing career permanently.

== Coaching career ==
Eaves took a head coaching position at the University of Wisconsin–Eau Claire in 1986, a position he held for one season. The following season he was an assistant coach with St. Cloud State University. He joined the Philadelphia Flyers as an assistant coach in 1988, and was named head coach of the Flyers' American Hockey League affiliate Hershey Bears in 1990. He held the position for three years until the 1993–94 season, when he rejoined the Flyers as an assistant coach.

He took the head coach position at HIFK in the Finnish SM-liiga in 1996 and coached there for the following season. He quit and joined the Pittsburgh Penguins as an assistant coach from 1997 to 2000. The following year he was named head coach of the United States National Junior Team. In the 2002–2003 season Eaves joined his old college team, the Wisconsin Badgers, as their head coach. He had a physical confrontation with Alex Leavitt in November 2002 that led to the university reprimanding Eaves, and Leavitt suing Eaves and the university. The suit was settled by paying Leavitt the value of his lost scholarship, $55,000. In 2003–2004, Eaves brought the Badgers just short of the Frozen Four, falling in overtime to Maine. Eaves was also the head coach of the United States men's national junior ice hockey team, which won their first-ever 2004 World Junior Ice Hockey Championships.

After a disappointing finish to the 2004–2005 season, the Badgers won the 2006 NCAA championship held in Milwaukee, Wisconsin. After the NCAA season, Eaves was named head coach of the U.S. national team for the 2006 IIHF World Championship in Riga, Latvia. Eaves' 2010 squad returned to the Frozen Four, Wisconsin's 11th appearance there, losing in a bid for their seventh NCAA title. The 2014–15 season saw the team finish the season with a record of 4–26–5, the worst overall record in modern school history. After finishing 8–19–8–0 in the following season, Eaves was fired as coach on March 18, 2016. On May 27, 2016 Eaves was named head coach of the Division III St. Olaf College men's hockey team.

On June 18, 2019, the Columbus Blue Jackets named Eaves the head coach of the team's American Hockey League affiliate, the Cleveland Monsters. On April 30, 2022, Eaves resigned after three seasons.

Record table
| Season | Team | Overall | Conference | Standing | Postseason |
|---|---|---|---|---|---|
Wisconsin Badgers (WCHA) (2002–2013)
| 2002–03 | Wisconsin | 13–23–4 | 7–17–4 | 8th | WCHA First Round |
| 2003–04 | Wisconsin | 22–13–8 | 14–7–7 | 3rd | NCAA Second Round |
| 2004–05 | Wisconsin | 23–14–4 | 16–9–3 | T–3rd | NCAA First Round |
| 2005–06 | Wisconsin | 30–10–3 | 17–8–3 | T–2nd | NCAA Champions |
| 2006–07 | Wisconsin | 19–18–4 | 12–13–3 | T–6th | WCHA Third Place Game (Win) |
| 2007–08 | Wisconsin | 16–17–7 | 11–12–5 | 6th | NCAA Second Round |
| 2008–09 | Wisconsin | 20–16–4 | 14–11–3 | T–3rd | WCHA Third Place Game (Win) |
| 2009–10 | Wisconsin | 28–11–4 | 17–8–3 | 2nd | NCAA Runner Up |
| 2010–11 | Wisconsin | 21–16–4 | 12–13–3 | 7th | WCHA First Round |
| 2011–12 | Wisconsin | 17–18–2 | 11–15–2 | 10th | WCHA First Round |
| 2012–13 | Wisconsin | 22–13–7 | 13–8–7 | T–4th | NCAA First Round |
| Wisconsin: | | 231–169–51 | 144–121–43 | | |
Wisconsin Badgers (Big Ten) (2013–2016)
| 2013–14 | Wisconsin | 24–11–2 | 13–6–1 | 2nd | NCAA First Round |
| 2014–15 | Wisconsin | 4–26–5 | 2–15–3 | 6th | Big Ten Quarterfinals |
| 2015–16 | Wisconsin | 8–19–8 | 3–13–4 | 6th | Big Ten Quarterfinals |
| Wisconsin: | | 36–56–15 | 18–34–8 | | |
St. Olaf Oles (MIAC) (2016–2019)
| 2016–17 | St. Olaf | 7–15–3 | 5–9–2 | 7th | |
| 2017–18 | St. Olaf | 9–12–3 | 6–8–2 | 7th | |
| 2018–19 | St. Olaf | 5–17–2 | 3–11–2 | 9th | |
| St. Olaf: | | 21–44–8 | 14–28–6 | | |
| Total: | | 288–269–74 | | | |
National champion Postseason invitational champion Conference regular season champion Conference regular season and conference tournament champion Division regular season champion Division regular season and conference tournament champion Conference tournament champion

== Career statistics ==
=== Regular season and playoffs ===
| | | | Regular season | | | | | Playoffs |
| Season | Team | League | GP | G | A | Pts | PIM | GP | G | A | Pts | PIM |
|---|---|---|---|---|---|---|---|---|---|---|---|---|
| 1973–74 | Nepean Raiders | CJHL | 54 | 54 | 48 | 102 | — | — | — | — | — | — |
| 1974–75 | University of Wisconsin | WCHA | 38 | 17 | 37 | 54 | 12 | — | — | — | — | — |
| 1975–76 | University of Wisconsin | WCHA | 34 | 18 | 25 | 43 | 22 | — | — | — | — | — |
| 1976–77 | University of Wisconsin | WCHA | 45 | 28 | 53 | 81 | 18 | — | — | — | — | — |
| 1977–78 | University of Wisconsin | WCHA | 43 | 31 | 58 | 89 | 16 | — | — | — | — | — |
| 1978–79 | Oklahoma City Stars | CHL | 68 | 26 | 61 | 87 | 21 | — | — | — | — | — |
| 1978–79 | Minnesota North Stars | NHL | 3 | 0 | 0 | 0 | 0 | — | — | — | — | — |
| 1979–80 | Oklahoma City Stars | CHL | 12 | 9 | 8 | 17 | 2 | — | — | — | — | — |
| 1979–80 | Minnesota North Stars | NHL | 56 | 18 | 28 | 46 | 11 | 15 | 2 | 5 | 7 | 4 |
| 1980–81 | Minnesota North Stars | NHL | 48 | 10 | 24 | 34 | 18 | — | — | — | — | — |
| 1981–82 | Minnesota North Stars | NHL | 25 | 11 | 10 | 21 | 0 | — | — | — | — | — |
| 1982–83 | Minnesota North Stars | NHL | 75 | 16 | 16 | 32 | 21 | 9 | 0 | 0 | 0 | 0 |
| 1983–84 | Calgary Flames | NHL | 61 | 14 | 36 | 50 | 20 | 11 | 4 | 4 | 8 | 2 |
| 1984–85 | Calgary Flames | NHL | 56 | 14 | 29 | 43 | 10 | — | — | — | — | — |
| 1985–86 | Calgary Flames | NHL | — | — | — | — | — | 8 | 1 | 1 | 2 | 8 |
| NHL totals | | | 324 | 83 | 143 | 226 | 80 | 43 | 7 | 10 | 17 | 14 |

== Awards and honors ==
| Award | Year |
|---|---|
| AHCA West All-American | 1975–76; 1976–77; 1977–78 |
| All-WCHA Second Team | 1976–77 |
| All-WCHA First Team | 1977–78 |
| CHL Second All-Star Team | 1979 |
| Ken McKenzie Trophy (CHL Rookie of the Year) | 1979 |

Awards and achievements
| Preceded by Brian Walsh | WCHA Most Valuable Player; 1977–78 | Succeeded by Mark Johnson |
| Preceded by Dave Taylor | NCAA Ice Hockey Scoring Champion; 1977–78 | Succeeded by Mark Johnson |
Sporting positions
| Preceded by Hannu Kapanen | Head Coach of HIFK; 1996–1997 | Succeeded by Erkka Westerlund |
