= 1976–77 NCAA Division I men's ice hockey season =

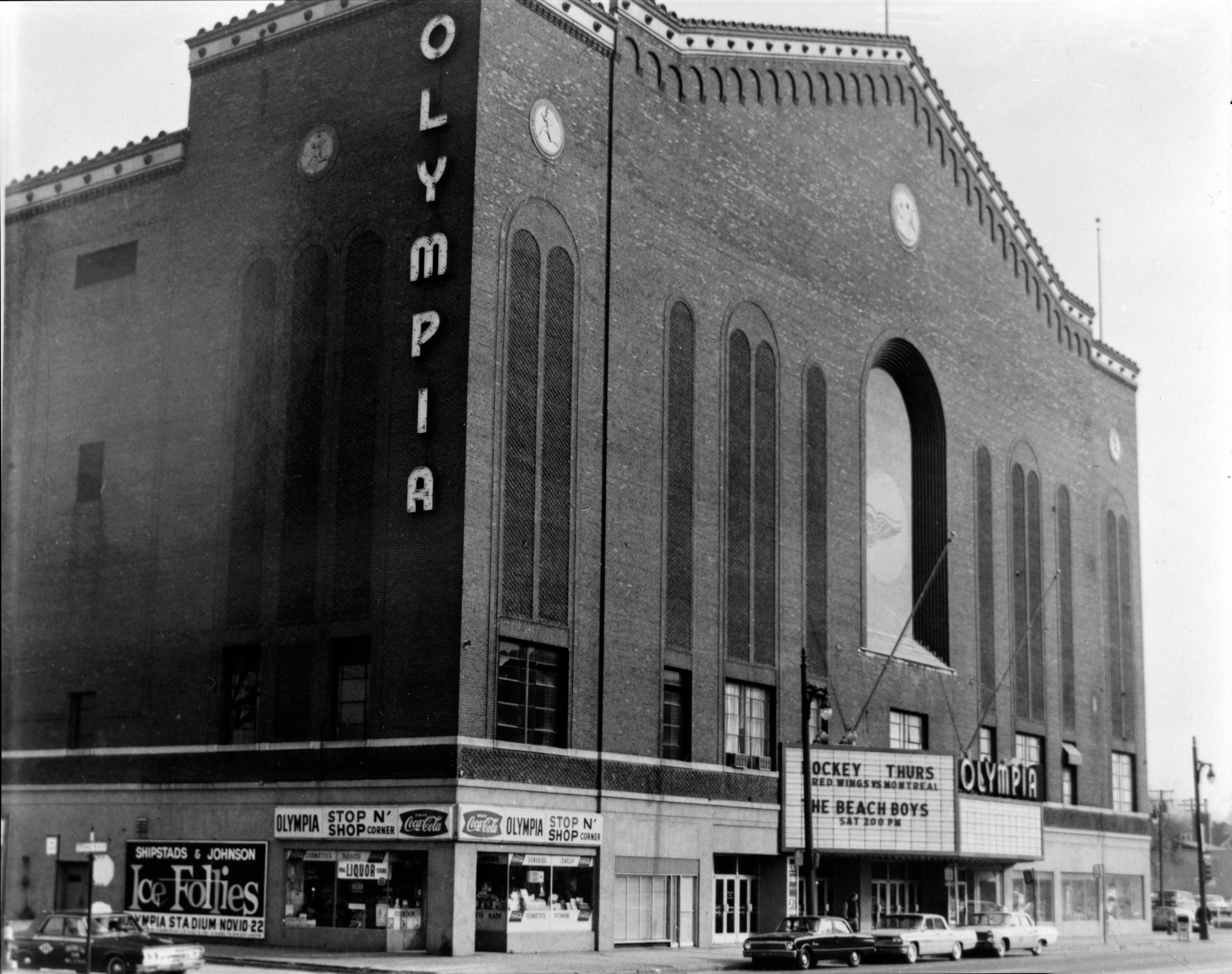
- The Olympia Stadium served as the host for the 1977 Frozen Four
- Duration: October 1976– March 26, 1977
- NCAA tournament: 1977
- National championship: Olympia Stadium; Detroit, Michigan
- NCAA champion: Wisconsin

The 1976–77 NCAA Division I men's ice hockey season began in October 1976 and concluded with the 1977 NCAA Division I Men's Ice Hockey Tournament's championship game on March 26, 1977, at the Olympia Stadium in Detroit, Michigan. This was the 30th season in which an NCAA ice hockey championship was held and is the 83rd year overall where an NCAA school fielded a team.

== Season Outlook ==
=== Pre-season poll ===
The top teams in the nation voted on by coaches before the start of the season. The poll was compiled by radio station WMPL.

WMPL Poll
| Rank | Team |
|---|---|
| 1 | Wisconsin |
| 2 | Minnesota |
| 3 | Brown |
| 4 | Michigan |
| 5 | Colorado College |
| 6 | New Hampshire |
| 7 | Saint Louis |
| 8 | Boston University |
| 9 | Michigan Tech |
| 10 | Bowling Green |

== Regular season ==
=== Season tournaments ===
| Tournament | Dates | Teams | Champion |
|---|---|---|---|
| North Country Thanksgiving Festival | November 25–28 | 4 | Clarkson |
| Binghamton Invitational | November 26–27 | 4 | York |
| Brown Invitational | December 20–22 | 4 | Vermont |
| Great Lakes Invitational | December 28–29 | 4 | Michigan Tech |
| Syracuse Invitational | December 28–29 | 4 | Boston College |
| Rensselaer Holiday Tournament | December 28–30 | 4 | Rensselaer |
| Union Holiday Festival Tournament | December 29–30 | 4 | Union, Western Ontario |
| Blue–Green Invitational | January 2–3 | 4 | New Hampshire |
| ECAC Holiday Hockey Festival | January 2–3 | 4 | Boston University |
| Beanpot | February 7, 14 | 4 | Harvard |

=== Standings ===
1976–77 Big Ten standings
| | Conference | | | | | | | Overall | | | | | |
| | GP | W | L | T | PTS | GF | GA | GP | W | L | T | GF | GA |
|---|---|---|---|---|---|---|---|---|---|---|---|---|---|
| Wisconsin† | 12 | 9 | 3 | 0 | 18 | 78 | 47 | 45 | 37 | 7 | 1 | 264 | 161 |
| Michigan | 12 | 7 | 5 | 0 | 14 | 68 | 61 | 45 | 28 | 17 | 0 | 260 | 211 |
| Minnesota | 12 | 5 | 7 | 0 | 10 | 46 | 56 | 41 | 17 | 21 | 3 | 177 | 202 |
| Michigan State | 12 | 3 | 9 | 0 | 6 | 41 | 69 | 36 | 14 | 21 | 1 | 145 | 189 |
† indicates conference regular season champion

1976–77 Central Collegiate Hockey Association standings
| | Conference | | | | | | | Overall | | | | | |
| | GP | W | L | T | PTS | GF | GA | GP | W | L | T | GF | GA |
|---|---|---|---|---|---|---|---|---|---|---|---|---|---|
| Saint Louis† | 16 | 13 | 2 | 1 | 27 | 89 | 52 | 39 | 27 | 11 | 1 | 197 | 128 |
| Bowling Green* | 16 | 10 | 6 | 0 | 20 | 94 | 52 | 39 | 28 | 11 | 0 | 209 | 113 |
| Ohio State | 16 | 8 | 7 | 1 | 17 | 64 | 74 | 38 | 17 | 20 | 1 | 160 | 178 |
| Western Michigan | 16 | 5 | 11 | 0 | 10 | 52 | 79 | 37 | 17 | 19 | 1 | 179 | 180 |
| Lake Superior State | 16 | 3 | 13 | 0 | 6 | 56 | 98 | 33 | 10 | 23 | 0 | 139 | 197 |
Championship: Bowling Green † indicates conference regular season champion * indicates conference tournament champion

1976–77 ECAC Hockey standings
| | Conference | | | | | | | Overall | | | | | |
| | GP | W | L | T | Pct. | GF | GA | GP | W | L | T | GF | GA |
|---|---|---|---|---|---|---|---|---|---|---|---|---|---|
| Clarkson† | 23 | 19 | 4 | 0 | .826 | 146 | 87 | 34 | 26 | 8 | 0 | 222 | 127 |
| New Hampshire | 27 | 21 | 6 | 0 | .778 | 182 | 121 | 39 | 27 | 12 | 0 | 245 | 181 |
| Cornell | 23 | 16 | 6 | 1 | .717 | 160 | 102 | 29 | 20 | 8 | 1 | 204 | 134 |
| Boston University* | 24 | 16 | 7 | 1 | .688 | 142 | 110 | 34 | 22 | 11 | 1 | 198 | 160 |
| Boston College | 23 | 13 | 9 | 1 | .587 | 125 | 106 | 30 | 18 | 11 | 1 | 174 | 130 |
| Rensselaer | 24 | 14 | 10 | 0 | .583 | 138 | 131 | 30 | 17 | 12 | 1 | 184 | 168 |
| Brown | 21 | 12 | 9 | 0 | .571 | 121 | 95 | 27 | 16 | 11 | 0 | 145 | 118 |
| Providence | 25 | 14 | 11 | 0 | .560 | 124 | 105 | 30 | 17 | 13 | 0 | 146 | 128 |
| Harvard | 22 | 12 | 10 | 0 | .545 | 92 | 78 | 26 | 14 | 12 | 0 | 108 | 95 |
| Dartmouth | 24 | 11 | 12 | 1 | .479 | 136 | 118 | 26 | 12 | 12 | 2 | 146 | 124 |
| Vermont | 23 | 10 | 13 | 0 | .435 | 105 | 103 | 30 | 15 | 15 | 0 | 141 | 122 |
| Colgate | 24 | 10 | 14 | 0 | .417 | 110 | 144 | 28 | 12 | 16 | 0 | 128 | 170 |
| Northeastern | 22 | 9 | 13 | 0 | .409 | 92 | 125 | 27 | 11 | 16 | 0 | 121 | 141 |
| Pennsylvania | 24 | 7 | 17 | 0 | .292 | 93 | 148 | 26 | 9 | 17 | 0 | 105 | 157 |
| Yale | 23 | 5 | 17 | 1 | .239 | 73 | 130 | 25 | 6 | 18 | 1 | 84 | 140 |
| St. Lawrence | 20 | 3 | 17 | 0 | .150 | 86 | 147 | 28 | 8 | 20 | 0 | 134 | 182 |
| Princeton | 24 | 3 | 20 | 1 | .146 | 70 | 143 | 25 | 3 | 21 | 1 | 72 | 150 |
Championship: Boston University † indicates conference regular season champion * indicates conference tournament champion

1976–77 NCAA Division I Independent ice hockey standings
| | Conference | | | | | | | Overall | | | | | |
| | GP | W | L | T | PTS | GF | GA | GP | W | L | T | GF | GA |
|---|---|---|---|---|---|---|---|---|---|---|---|---|---|
| Air Force | 0 | 0 | 0 | 0 | - | - | - | 27 | 20 | 7 | 0 | 170 | 104 |
| Northern Michigan | 0 | 0 | 0 | 0 | - | - | - | 33 | 19 | 13 | 1 | 174 | 130 |

1976–77 Western Collegiate Hockey Association standings
| | Conference | | | | | | | Overall | | | | | |
| | GP | W | L | T | PTS | GF | GA | GP | W | L | T | GF | GA |
|---|---|---|---|---|---|---|---|---|---|---|---|---|---|
| Wisconsin†* | 32 | 26 | 5 | 1 | 53 | 192 | 122 | 45 | 37 | 7 | 1 | 264 | 161 |
| Notre Dame | 32 | 19 | 10 | 3 | 41 | 164 | 127 | 38 | 22 | 13 | 3 | 191 | 147 |
| Michigan | 32 | 20 | 12 | 0 | 40 | 183 | 151 | 45 | 28 | 17 | 0 | 260 | 211 |
| Denver | 32 | 16 | 14 | 2 | 34 | 154 | 151 | 40 | 21 | 17 | 2 | 206 | 187 |
| North Dakota | 32 | 16 | 16 | 0 | 32 | 168 | 158 | 38 | 19 | 19 | 0 | 202 | 184 |
| Michigan Tech | 32 | 15 | 16 | 1 | 31 | 143 | 150 | 38 | 19 | 18 | 1 | 177 | 178 |
| Minnesota | 32 | 13 | 16 | 3 | 29 | 135 | 144 | 41 | 17 | 21 | 3 | 177 | 202 |
| Colorado College | 32 | 11 | 20 | 1 | 23 | 156 | 170 | 40 | 13 | 25 | 2 | 194 | 209 |
| Michigan State | 32 | 11 | 20 | 1 | 23 | 122 | 171 | 36 | 14 | 21 | 1 | 145 | 189 |
| Minnesota-Duluth | 32 | 6 | 24 | 2 | 14 | 119 | 192 | 37 | 9 | 26 | 2 | 148 | 219 |
Championship: Wisconsin † indicates conference regular season champion * indicates conference tournament champion

=== Final regular season polls ===
The final top 10 teams as ranked by coaches (WMPL) before the conference tournament finals.

WMPL Coaches Poll
| Ranking | Team |
|---|---|
| 1 | Wisconsin |
| 2 | Clarkson |
| 3 | Notre Dame |
| 4 | Michigan |
| 5 | New Hampshire |
| 6 | Boston University |
| 7 | Saint Louis |
| 8 | Denver |
| 9 | Cornell |
| 10 | Bowling Green State |

== 1977 NCAA Tournament ==
First round March 20
W2 | Michigan | 6
A | Bowling Green | 3

Semifinals; March 24–25
E1 | Boston University | 4
W2 | Michigan | 6
W1 | Wisconsin | 4*
E2 | New Hampshire | 3

National championship March 26
W2 | Michigan | 5
W1 | Wisconsin | 6*
Third-place game
E1 | Boston University | 6
E2 | New Hampshire | 5

Note: * denotes overtime period(s)

== Player stats ==
=== Scoring leaders ===
The following players led the league in points at the conclusion of the season.

GP = Games played; G = Goals; A = Assists; Pts = Points; PIM = Penalty minutes

| Player | Class | Team | GP | G | A | Pts | PIM |
|---|---|---|---|---|---|---|---|
| Dave Taylor | Senior | Clarkson | 34 | 41 | 67 | 108 | 70 |
| Dave Debol | Junior | Michigan | 45 | 43 | 56 | 99 | 40 |
| Bob Miller | Sophomore | New Hampshire | 38 | 30 | 59 | 89 | 45 |
| Craig Norwich | Junior | Wisconsin | 44 | 18 | 65 | 83 | 70 |
| Mike Eaves | Junior | Wisconsin | 45 | 28 | 53 | 81 | 18 |
| Mark Johnson | Freshman | Wisconsin | 43 | 36 | 44 | 80 | 16 |
| Rick Meagher | Senior | Boston University | 34 | 34 | 46 | 80 | 42 |
| Lance Nethery | Sophomore | Cornell | 29 | 32 | 46 | 78 | 18 |
| Brian Walsh | Senior | Notre Dame | 38 | 30 | 47 | 77 | 70 |
| Ralph Cox | Sophomore | New Hampshire | 37 | 40 | 36 | 76 | 50 |
| Kip Maurer | Junior | Michigan | - | 38 | 38 | 76 | 8 |

=== Leading goaltenders ===
The following goaltenders led the league in goals against average at the end of the regular season while playing at least 33% of their team's total minutes.

GP = Games played; Min = Minutes played; W = Wins; L = Losses; OT = Overtime/shootout losses; GA = Goals against; SO = Shutouts; SV% = Save percentage; GAA = Goals against average

| Player | Class | Team | GP | Min | W | L | OT | GA | SO | SV% | GAA |
|---|---|---|---|---|---|---|---|---|---|---|---|
| Mike Liut | Senior | Bowling Green | 24 | 1346 | 18 | 4 | 0 | 61 | 2 | .901 | 2.72 |
| Lindsay Middlebrook | Senior | Saint Louis | 18 | 1058 | 11 | 7 | 0 | 54 | 1 | .893 | 3.07 |
| Julian Baretta | Sophomore | Wisconsin | 26 | 1458 | 21 | 2 | 0 | 75 | 2 | .905 | 3.08 |
| Tom Talbot | Sophomore | Air Force | - | - | - | - | - | 64 | - | .905 | 3.40 |
| John Peterson | Junior | Notre Dame | 17 | - | - | - | - | 70 | 0 | .899 | 3.44 |
| Peter Reynolds | Senior | Vermont | 18 | 912 | - | - | - | 54 | 0 | .878 | 3.55 |
| Brian Shields | Senior | Clarkson | 32 | 1850 | 26 | - | 0 | 111 | 1 | .896 | 3.60 |
| Brian Petrovek | Junior | Harvard | 26 | 1575 | 14 | 12 | 0 | 95 | 1 | .864 | 3.62 |
| Chuck Stevens | Sophomore | Michigan Tech | 10 | - | - | - | - | - | - | .882 | 3.67 |
| Barrie Oakes | Freshman | Northern Michigan | 21 | - | - | - | - | - | - | .884 | 3.70 |

== Awards ==
=== NCAA ===
| Award | | Recipient |
|---|---|---|
| Spencer Penrose Award | | Jerry York, Clarkson |
| Most Outstanding Player in NCAA Tournament | | Julian Baretta, Wisconsin |
AHCA All-American Teams
| East Team | Position | West Team |
| Brian Shields, Clarkson | G | Julian Baretta, Wisconsin |
| Bill Blackwood, Clarkson | D | Jack Brownschidle, Notre Dame |
| Tim Burke, New Hampshire | D | Craig Norwich, Wisconsin |
| Rick Meagher, Boston University | F | Dave Debol, Michigan |
| Bob Miller, New Hampshire | F | Mike Eaves, Wisconsin |
| Dave Taylor, Clarkson | F | Brian Walsh, Notre Dame |

=== CCHA ===
| Award | | Recipient |
|---|---|---|
| Player of the Year | | Mike Liut, Bowling Green |
| Coach of the Year | | Bill Selman, Saint Louis |
All-CCHA Teams
| First Team | Position | Second Team |
| Mike Liut, Bowling Green | G | Pat Tims, Lake Superior State |
| John Mavity, Bowling Green | D | Ken Morrow, Bowling Green |
| Kent Jackson, Saint Louis | D | Doug Butler, Saint Louis |
| Mark Wells, Bowling Green | F | Gary Murphy, Saint Louis |
| John Markell, Bowling Green | F | Wayne Ormson, Saint Louis |
| Tim Dunlop, Western Michigan | F | Paul Tilley, Ohio State |

=== ECAC ===
| Award | | Recipient |
|---|---|---|
| Player of the Year | | Dave Taylor, Clarkson |
| Rookie of the Year | | Jack Hughes, Harvard |
| Most Outstanding Player in Tournament | | Rick Meagher, Boston University |
All-ECAC Hockey Teams
| First Team | Position | Second Team |
| Brian Shields, Clarkson | G | Paul Skidmore, Boston College |
| Jack Hughes, Harvard | D | Ron Wilson, Providence |
| Tim Bothwell, Brown | D | Bill Blackwood, Clarkson |
| | D | Tim Burke, New Hampshire |
| Dave Taylor, Clarkson | F | Mike Eruzione, Boston University |
| Rick Meagher, Boston University | F | Lance Nethery, Cornell |
| Bob Miller, New Hampshire | F | Bob Ferriter, Boston College |

=== WCHA ===
| Award | | Recipient |
|---|---|---|
| Most Valuable Player | | Brian Walsh, Notre Dame |
| Freshman of the Year | | Mark Johnson, Wisconsin |
| Coach of the Year | | Bob Johnson, Wisconsin |
All-WCHA Teams
| First Team | Position | Second Team |
| Julian Baretta, Wisconsin | G | John Peterson, Notre Dame |
| Jack Brownschidle, Notre Dame | D | Greg Woods, Denver |
| Craig Norwich, Wisconsin | D | John Taft, Wisconsin |
| Brian Walsh, Notre Dame | F | Dan Lempe, Minnesota-Duluth |
| Dave Debol, Michigan | F | Roger Lamoureux, North Dakota |
| Kris Manery, Michigan | F | Mike Eaves, Wisconsin |

== 1977 NHL Amateur Draft ==
| Round | Pick | Player | College | Conference | NHL team |
|---|---|---|---|---|---|
| 2 | 27 | Neil Labatte | Brown | ECAC Hockey | St. Louis Blues |
| 2 | 35 | Tom Gorence | Minnesota | WCHA | Philadelphia Flyers |
| 2 | 36 | Rod Langway | New Hampshire | ECAC Hockey | Montreal Canadiens |
| 3 | 38 | Doug Berry | Denver | WCHA | Colorado Rockies |
| 4 | 66 | Mark Johnson | Wisconsin | WCHA | Pittsburgh Penguins |
| 4 | 69 | Steve Stoyanovich | Rensselaer | ECAC Hockey | New York Islanders |
| 4 | 72 | Jim Craig | Boston University | ECAC Hockey | Atlanta Flames |
| 5 | 73 | Jim Korn | Providence | ECAC Hockey | Detroit Red Wings |
| 5 | 82 | Curt Christofferson | Colorado College | WCHA | Atlanta Flames |
| 5 | 84 | Julian Baretta | Wisconsin | WCHA | Los Angeles Kings |
| 6 | 92 | Dan Lempe | Minnesota–Duluth | WCHA | Colorado Rockies |
| 6 | 93 | Perry Schnarr | Denver | WCHA | Washington Capitals |
| 6 | 96 | Jack O'Callahan | Boston University | ECAC Hockey | Chicago Black Hawks |
| 6 | 98 | John Bethel | Boston University | ECAC Hockey | New York Rangers |
| 6 | 105 | Steve Letzgus | Michigan Tech | WCHA | New York Islanders |
| 6 | 108 | Bill Himmelright | North Dakota | WCHA | Montreal Canadiens |
| 7 | 109 | Randy Wilson | Providence | ECAC Hockey | Detroit Red Wings |
| 7 | 118 | Bobby Gould | New Hampshire | ECAC Hockey | Atlanta Flames |
| 7 | 120 | Bob Suter | Wisconsin | WCHA | Los Angeles Kings |
| 7 | 122 | Ralph Cox | New Hampshire | ECAC Hockey | Boston Bruins |
| 8 | 131 | Lance Nethery | Cornell | ECAC Hockey | New York Rangers |
| 8 | 133 | Jimmy Bennett | Brown | ECAC Hockey | Atlanta Flames |
| 8 | 137 | Keith Hendrickson | Minnesota–Duluth | WCHA | Montreal Canadiens |
| 8 | 139 | Mike Greeder | Minnesota | WCHA | Philadelphia Flyers |
| 8 | 140 | Mike Reilly | Colorado College | WCHA | Montreal Canadiens |
| 9 | 142 | Jack Hughes | Harvard | ECAC Hockey | Colorado Rockies |
| 9 | 143 | Don Micheletti | Minnesota | WCHA | Washington Capitals |
| 9 | 145 | Keith Hanson ^{†} | Northern Michigan | CCHA | Minnesota North Stars |
| 9 | 148 | Tim Harrer | Minnesota | WCHA | Atlanta Flames |
| 9 | 149 | Ray Robertson | St. Lawrence | ECAC Hockey | Toronto Maple Leafs |
| 9 | 150 | Tom Bauer | Providence | ECAC Hockey | Philadelphia Flyers |
| 9 | 153 | Bruce Crowder | New Hampshire | ECAC Hockey | Philadelphia Flyers |
| 9 | 154 | Sid Tanchak | Clarkson | ECAC Hockey | Montreal Canadiens |
| 10 | 157 | Peter Raps | Western Michigan | CCHA | New York Rangers |
| 10 | 160 | Mark Holden | Brown | ECAC Hockey | Montreal Canadiens |
| 10 | 161 | Steve Jones | Ohio State | CCHA | Philadelphia Flyers |
| 10 | 162 | Craig Laughlin | Clarkson | ECAC Hockey | Montreal Canadiens |
| 11 | 164 | Mike Brown | Western Michigan | CCHA | New York Rangers |
| 11 | 165 | Jim Trainor | Harvard | ECAC Hockey | Philadelphia Flyers |
| 11 | 168 | Rod McNair | Ohio State | CCHA | Philadelphia Flyers |
| 12 | 171 | Mark Miller | Michigan | WCHA | New York Rangers |
| 12 | 172 | Mike Laycock | Brown | ECAC Hockey | Philadelphia Flyers |
| 13 | 176 | Mark Wells | Bowling Green | CCHA | Montreal Canadiens |
| 13 | 177 | Stan Palmer | Minnesota–Duluth | WCHA | Montreal Canadiens |
| 15 | 181 | Ed Hill | Vermont | ECAC Hockey | Detroit Red Wings |
| 15 | 182 | Bob Boileau | Boston University | ECAC Hockey | Montreal Canadiens |

== See also ==
- 1976–77 NCAA Division II men's ice hockey season
- 1976–77 NCAA Division III men's ice hockey season
