= Wisconsin Badgers men's ice hockey =

Men's ice hockey team of the University of Wisconsin

- Current season
- University: University of Wisconsin–Madison
- Conference: Big Ten
- First season: 1921–22; 105 years ago
- Athletic director: Shawn Eichorst
- Head coach: Mike Hastings; 4th season, 63–46–7 (.573)
- Assistant coaches: Todd Knott; Kevin Murdock
- Arena: Kohl Center; Madison, Wisconsin
- Colors: Cardinal and white
- Fight song: On, Wisconsin!

NCAA tournament champions
- 1973, 1977, 1981, 1983, 1990, 2006

NCAA tournament runner-up
- 1982, 1992, (Note: Vacated by NCAA.) 2010, 2026

NCAA tournament Frozen Four
- 1970, 1972, 1973, 1977, 1978, 1981, 1982, 1983, 1990, 1992, 2006, 2010, 2026

NCAA tournament appearances
- 1970, 1972, 1973, 1977, 1978, 1981, 1982, 1983, 1988, 1989, 1990, 1991, 1992, 1993, 1994, 1995, 1998, 2000, 2001, 2004, 2005, 2006, 2008, 2010, 2013, 2014, 2021, 2024, 2026

Conference tournament champions
- WCHA: 1970, 1972, 1973, 1977, 1978, 1982, 1983, 1988, 1990, 1995, 1998, 2013; Big Ten: 1969, 2014

Conference regular season champions
- WCHA: 1977, 1990, 2000; Big Ten: 1972, 1973, 1974, 1977, 1978, 2021 (Note: Despite their members belonging to other conferences, the Big Ten still awarded regular season conference championships from 1923 to 1943 and 1959 to 1981, and held a conference tournament from 1967 to 1969. In 2013, the Big Ten began officially sponsoring hockey again.)

Current uniform

The Wisconsin Badgers men's ice hockey team is the college ice hockey team that represents the University of Wisconsin–Madison in Madison, Wisconsin. The team plays at the Kohl Center and is currently coached by Mike Hastings. The Badgers ice hockey team competes in the Big Ten Conference.

The Badgers have won three WCHA regular season conference titles and 11 conference tournament titles. They have also made 24 appearances in the NCAA men's ice hockey tournament, advancing to the Frozen Four 12 times. The team's six national titles rank fourth best in college hockey history.

Their most recent national championship came in 2006 when the Badgers defeated the Boston College Eagles 2–1 at the Bradley Center in Milwaukee, Wisconsin.

== History ==
=== Early history ===
Pond hockey had been played on Lake Mendota in Madison since the late 1800s. The University of Wisconsin formed an informal hockey program in the 1910s. The 1921 season saw the development of intercollegiate hockey at Michigan, Wisconsin, and Minnesota. Michigan and Wisconsin scheduled four games to be played on consecutive weekends from February 18 to 26, 1921.

=== Modern era ===
The modern era of Badger hockey began in 1963 with the decision of athletic director Ivan B. Williamson. The Badgers played home games at the Hartmeyer Ice Arena before moving to the Dane County Coliseum in 1967. The program began as an independent NCAA Division I team and scheduling 8 games against Western Collegiate Hockey Association teams, losing all 8 games. Late in the 1965–66 season, the Badgers finally broke through, beating the Minnesota Golden Gophers 5–4 in overtime, their first win over a WCHA opponent. At the end of that season, Coach John Riley retired.

=== Johnson era ===
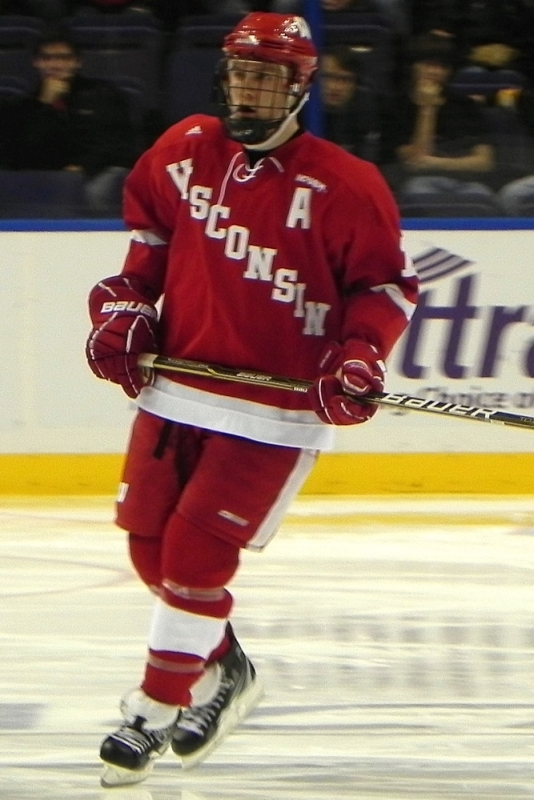
Jake Gardiner playing for Wisconsin (2010).

In 1966, Wisconsin hired "Badger" Bob Johnson. Under Johnson, Wisconsin was offered WCHA membership for the 1969–70 season. In that same season the Badgers received a bid to the NCAA Division I Men's Ice Hockey Tournament. The Badgers won their first national championship at the 1973 Frozen Four. Badger Bob's 1977 team was one of the most successful to date, as the team swept through the WCHA tournament and the 1977 NCAA Tournament. Behind the efforts of four first team All-Americans, Mike Eaves, Mark Johnson (Bob's son), Craig Norwich and Julian Baretta, the 1977 team won the title with a 6–5 victory in overtime against Michigan.

Despite losing one of their top players, Mark Johnson, to the 1980 American Olympic Team, the Badgers reached the NCAA title game three consecutive times in 1981, 1982, and 1983, winning the program's third title in 1981 by defeating rival Minnesota in the championship game 6–3. After again reaching the championship game in 1982, where the Badgers lost to North Dakota, the program was dealt a second blow with the departure of Johnson. He would later coach in the NHL and win the Stanley Cup with the Pittsburgh Penguins. He left Wisconsin after 15 seasons with 3 NCAA championships, a record of 367–175–23, and having built the program into an NCAA powerhouse. Johnson died in 1991.

=== Sauer era ===
Former Badger assistant coach Jeff Sauer was hired in 1982 to replace Bob Johnson as head coach. Sauer won the 1983 NCAA championship in his first season. Wisconsin defeated Harvard 6–2 to earn the program's fourth NCAA title. Under Sauer's leadership, the Badgers qualified for eight consecutive NCAA tournaments from 1988 to 1995, and won the program's 5th NCAA title in 1990, with a 7–3 victory over Colgate. Also, Sauer presided over the team's move from the aging Coliseum to the new, on-campus Kohl Center in 1998. The Badger men led the nation in college hockey attendance every year from moving to the Kohl Center through the 2011 season.

Wisconsin again reached the 1992 NCAA Championship game against Lake Superior State, losing 5–3. The game, which featured some questionable calls by the referee that continually put the Badgers at a two-man disadvantage, irked several players so much that they lashed out beyond Sauer's control, verbally abusing the referees and earning Sauer a one-game NCAA suspension. Assistant Coach Bill Zito received a two-game suspension, while players Blaine Moore and Jason Zent each received a one-game suspension. That game was later vacated by the NCAA for rules violations unrelated to the incidents in the championship game. In the mid-1990s, Badger hockey earned NCAA bids in 1998 and 2000, but generally underachieved compared to the high standards of the 1970s and 1980s. The 1999–2000 team featured a duo of second overall NHL draft pick Dany Heatley and Steven Reinprecht, won the MacNaughton Cup, and earned a No. 1 position in the polls for most of the season, only to be upset by Boston College in the NCAA regionals. Two seasons later, during the 2001–02 season, coach Sauer announced his retirement. Jeff Sauer left Wisconsin with two NCAA titles and a record of 489–306–46 at Wisconsin, and a 655–532–57 overall record as a head coach.

=== Eaves era ===
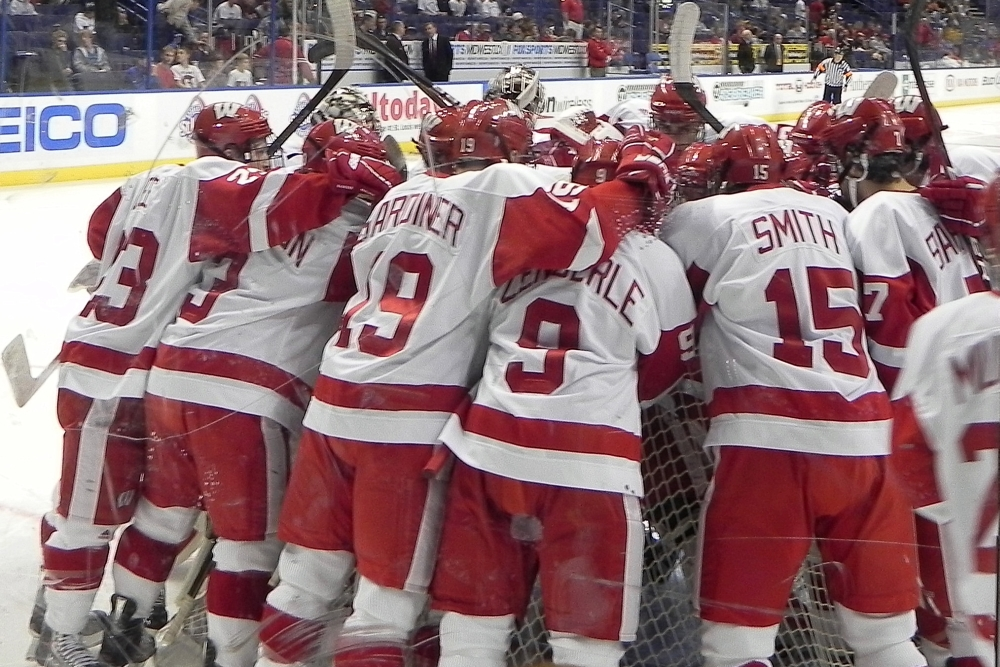
Badgers gather before a game against Boston University (2010).

Sauer's replacement was Mike Eaves, a former player who was a captain on the 1977 NCAA championship team and still holds the record as Wisconsin's all-time leading scorer. In 2003–04, Eaves brought the Badgers just short of the Frozen Four, falling in overtime to Maine in the 2004 NCAA Tournament. The Badgers returned to national prominence by winning the 2006 NCAA championship in Milwaukee with a 2–1 win over Boston College. In 2010, the Badgers returned to the NCAA championship, vying for a seventh NCAA title but lost 5–0 to Boston College at Ford Field in Detroit, Michigan, in front of a then-record crowd for an indoor ice hockey game of 37,592. In 2011, they missed the WCHA Final Five and NCAA tournament completely. In 2012, the team missed the NCAA Tournament again. In 2013 they were winners in their last-ever appearance in the WCHA Final Five before the team joined the newly established Big Ten Hockey conference for the 2013–14 season. In the inaugural season of the Big Ten Hockey conference, the Badgers won the Big Ten Tournament, their second consecutive conference tournament championship. The 2014–15 season was the worst season in team history. They finished the season with a record of 4–26–5, setting school records for fewest wins and most losses in a season. Eaves was fired on March 18, 2016 after finishing the 2015–16 season with an 8–19–8 record.

=== Granato era ===
Athletic director Barry Alvarez hired Detroit Red Wings assistant Tony Granato to replace Eaves in late March 2016. Also hired were Tony's younger brother Don Granato, coach of the U.S. National Team Development Program's under-17 team, and Mark Osiecki, associate head coach of the American Hockey League's Rockford IceHogs and former assistant coach at Wisconsin for six years in the 2000s. Tony Granato signed a five-year contract worth $2.75 million while Osiecki and his brother signed three-year deals worth a total of $660,000 a piece. The hires were seen as getting UW Men's Ice Hockey back on track, and was noticed by media, such as the Wisconsin State Journal, when they said "Alvarez answered the critics who think UW no longer cares about men’s hockey in the best way he could" during the press conference introducing all three coaches Alvarez stated "I’m very confident that we’ve taken the right steps today in re-establishing the dominance of our hockey program" All three coaches are Wisconsin alums; Tony Granato played from 1983 to 1987 where he was an All-American, Don Granato played from 1987 to 1991, and Osiecki played from 1987 to 1990. After all three coaches were hired the phrase "Dream Team" came to be used when referring to UW's new coaching staff, it was first used by Barry Alvarez when he said "It was more than I could dream for to get all three of those guys. To me, it's the Dream Team."

In Granato's first season, he led the team back to respectability with a 20-15-1 overall record and a 12-8 conference record, good enough for second place. On March 18, they lost the conference championship game to Penn State 2–1 in double overtime.

On March 6, 2023, University of Wisconsin Director of Athletics Chris McIntosh announced that Granato would not return for the 2023-24 season.

=== Hastings era ===
On March 30, 2023, former Minnesota State University, Mankato Mavericks head coach Mike Hastings was named Granato's replacement as head coach. Wisconsin reached the NCAA Championship Game in 2026 under Hastings, falling 2-1 to Denver.

== Season-by-season results ==
Source:

== Coaches ==
=== All-time coaching records ===
As of the end of the 2025-26 season

Tenure	Coach	Years	Record	Pct.
1921–1923	A. C. Viner	2	3–13–3	.237
1923–1924	Robert Blodgett	1	3–9–1	.269
1924–1926	Kay Iverson	2	9–10–5	.479
1926–1927	Rube Brandow	1	1–9–0	.100
1927–1930	John Farquhar	3	21–20–7	.510
1930–1931	Spike Carlson	1	4–6–1	.409
1931–1935	Art Thomsen	4	9–22–1	.297
1963–1964	Art Thomsen & John Riley	1	8–5–3	.594
1964–1966	John Riley	2	26–18–0	.591
1966–1975, 1976–1982	Bob Johnson	15	367–175–23	.670
1975–1976	Bill Rothwell *	1	12–24–2	.342
1982–2002	Jeff Sauer	20	489–306–46	.609
2002–2016	Mike Eaves	14	267–225–66	.538
2016–2023	Tony Granato	7	105–129–16	.452
2023–Present	Mike Hastings	3	63-46-7	.573
Totals	14 coaches	77 seasons	1,387-1,017–181	.572

* Interim

== Championships ==
=== Big Ten Tournament ===
Year	Champion	Score	Runner-up	City	Arena
2014	Wisconsin	5–4	Ohio State	Saint Paul, MN	Xcel Energy Center

=== WCHA Tournament ===
Year	Champion	Score	Runner-up	City	Arena
2000	North Dakota	5–3	Wisconsin	Minneapolis, MN	Target Center
2013	Wisconsin	3–2	Colorado College	Saint Paul, MN	Xcel Energy Center

=== NCAA Championship Appearances ===
- Wisconsin appeared in the championship game in the following years:

Year	Champion	Score	Runner-up	City	Arena
1973	Wisconsin	4–2	Denver	Boston, MA	Boston Garden
1977	Wisconsin	6–5 OT	Michigan	Detroit, MI	Olympia Stadium
1981	Wisconsin	6–3	Minnesota	Duluth, MN	DECC
1982	North Dakota	5–2	Wisconsin	Providence, RI	Providence Civic Center
1983	Wisconsin	6–2	Harvard	Grand Forks, ND	Ralph Engelstad Arena
1990	Wisconsin	7–3	Colgate	Detroit, MI	Joe Louis Arena
1992	Lake Superior State	5–3	Wisconsin	Albany, NY	Knickerbocker Arena
2006	Wisconsin	2–1	Boston College	Milwaukee, WI	Bradley Center
2010	Boston College	5–0	Wisconsin	Detroit, MI	Ford Field
2026	Denver	2–1	Wisconsin	Las Vegas, NV	T-Mobile Arena

== Statistical leaders ==
=== Career points leaders ===
Player	Years	GP	G	A	Pts	PIM
Mike Eaves	1974–1978	160	94	173	267	
Mark Johnson	1976–1979	125	125	131	256	
Theran Welsh	1977–1981	161	34	194	228	
Tony Granato	1983–1987	152	100	120	220	
Scott Lecy	1977–1981	151	83	127	210	
Ron Vincent	1978–1982	159	75	131	206	
Doug MacDonald	1988–1992	152	75	114	189	
Delbert Dehate	1966–1970	95	108	80	188	
Les Grauer	1975–1979	163	83	98	181	
Paul Houck	1981–1985	165	82	95	177	
Paul Ranheim	1984–1988	161	88	89	177	

=== Career goaltending leaders ===
GP = Games played; Min = Minutes played; W = Wins; L = Losses; T = Ties; GA = Goals against; SO = Shutouts; SV% = Save percentage; GAA = Goals against average

Minimum 30 games played

Player	Years	GP	Min	W	L	T	GA	SO	SV%	GAA
Brian Elliott	2003–2007	84	4864	49	27	6	145	16	.930	1.78
Shane Connelly	2005–2009	90	5304	41	36	11	211	8	.913	2.39
Scott Gudmandson	2007–2011	70	4022	38	19	7	160	7	.912	2.39
Bernd Brückler	2001–2005	114	6630	51	41	16	274	8	.916	2.48
Curtis Joseph	1988–1989	39	2267	21	11	5	94	1	.919	2.49

Statistics current through the start of the 2019–20 season.

== Olympians ==
This is a list of Wisconsin alumni were a part of an Olympic team.

Name	Position	Wisconsin Tenure	Team	Year	Finish
Bob Lundeen	Forward/Defenseman	1971–1975	(United States) USA	1976	5th
Steve Alley	Left wing	1972–1975, 1976–1977	(United States) USA	1976	5th
John Taft	Defenseman	1972–1975, 1976–1977	(United States) USA	1976	5th
Mark Johnson	Center	1976–1979	(United States) USA	1980	Gold
Bob Suter	Defenseman	1975–1979	(United States) USA	1980	Gold
Marc Behrend	Goaltender	1979–1983	(United States) USA	1984	7th
Bruce Driver	Defenseman	1980–1983	Canada	1984	4th
Patrick Flatley	Right wing	1981–1983	Canada	1984	4th
Chris Chelios	Defenseman	1981–1983	(United States) USA	1984, 1998, 2002, 2006	7th, 6th, Silver, 8th
Tony Granato	Left wing	1983–1987	(United States) USA	1988	7th
Jim Johannson	Center	1982–1986	(United States) USA	1988, 1992	7th, 4th
Mike Richter	Goaltender	1985–1987	(United States) USA	1988, 1998, 2002	7th, 6th, Silver
Sean Hill	Defenseman	1988–1991	(United States) USA	1992	4th
Barry Richter	Defenseman	1989–1993	(United States) USA	1994	8th
Gary Suter	Defenseman	1983–1985	(United States) USA	1998, 2002	6th, Silver
Curtis Joseph	Goaltender	1988–1989	Canada	1998, 2002	4th, Gold
Brian Rafalski	Defenseman	1991–1995	(United States) USA	2002, 2006, 2010	Silver, 8th, Silver
Dany Heatley	Left wing	1999–2001	Canada	2010	Gold
Ryan Suter	Defenseman	2003–2004	(United States) USA	2010, 2014	Silver, 4th
Joe Pavelski	Center/Right Wing	2004–2006	(United States) USA	2010, 2014	Silver, 4th
Ryan McDonagh	Defenseman	2007–2010	(United States) USA	2014	4th
Derek Stepan	Center	2008–2010	(United States) USA	2014	4th
René Bourque	Winger	2000–2004	(Canada) CAN	2018	Bronze
Cody Goloubef	Defenseman	2007–2010	(Canada) CAN	2018	Bronze
Ben Street	Center/Left Wing	2005–2010	(Canada) CAN	2022	6th

== Players ==
=== Current roster ===
As of September 2, 2025.

No.	Nat.	Player	Class	Pos	Height	Weight	DoB	Hometown	Previous team	NHL rights
2	(United States)	Luke Osburn	Freshman	D	6' 1" (1.85 m)	185 lb (84 kg)	2006-09-09	Plymouth, Michigan	Youngstown Phantoms (USHL)	BUF, 108th overall 2024
4	(United States)	Ben Dexheimer	Senior	D	5' 10" (1.78 m)	172 lb (78 kg)	2002-06-21	Edina, Minnesota	Madison Capitols (USHL)	—
5	(United States)	Zach Schulz	Junior	D	6' 1" (1.85 m)	185 lb (84 kg)	2005-06-14	South Lyon, Michigan	USNTDP (USHL)	NYI, 177th overall 2023
6	(United States)	Logan Hensler	Sophomore	D	6' 2" (1.88 m)	196 lb (89 kg)	2006-10-14	Woodbury, Minnesota	USNTDP (USHL)	OTT, 23rd overall 2025
7	(United States)	Gavin Morrissey	Sophomore	F	5' 11" (1.8 m)	181 lb (82 kg)	2003-02-16	Rochester Hills, Michigan	Fargo Force (USHL)	—
8	(United States)	Jack Phelan	Sophomore	F	6' 3" (1.91 m)	185 lb (84 kg)	2004-05-28	Hinsdale, Illinois	Sioux Falls Stampede (USHL)	DET, 137th overall 2023
9	(United States)	Kyle Kukkonen	Senior	F	5' 10" (1.78 m)	174 lb (79 kg)	2002-11-13	Maple Grove, Minnesota	Michigan Tech (CCHA)	ANA, 162nd overall 2021
11	(Canada)	Simon Tassy	Senior	F	6' 2" (1.88 m)	190 lb (86 kg)	2001-03-21	Montreal, Quebec	Minnesota State (CCHA)	—
13	(Canada)	Christian Fitzgerald	Senior	F	6' 0" (1.83 m)	185 lb (84 kg)	2002-05-31	Coquitlam, British Columbia	Minnesota State (CCHA)	—
14	(United States)	Joe Palodichuk	Junior	D	6' 0" (1.83 m)	171 lb (78 kg)	2003-02-26	Cottage Grove, Minnesota	Fargo Force (USHL)	—
16	(Canada)	Tyson Dyck	Senior	F	6' 0" (1.83 m)	170 lb (77 kg)	2004-02-06	Abbotsford, British Columbia	Massachusetts (HEA)	OTT, 206th overall 2022
17	(United States)	Grady Deering	Freshman	F	6' 2" (1.88 m)	209 lb (95 kg)	2005-06-19	Des Moines, Iowa	Waterloo Black Hawks (USHL)	—
18	(United States)	Adam Pietila	Sophomore	F	5' 11" (1.8 m)	191 lb (87 kg)	2003-01-14	Hartland, Michigan	Youngstown Phantoms (USHL)	—
19	(United States)	Quinn Finley	Junior	F	6' 0" (1.83 m)	179 lb (81 kg)	2004-08-08	Suamico, Wisconsin	Chicago Steel (USHL)	NYI, 78th overall 2022
21	(Canada)	Ryan Botterill	Sophomore	F	5' 11" (1.8 m)	176 lb (80 kg)	2003-07-23	Portage la Prairie, Manitoba	Youngstown Phantoms (USHL)	—
22	(United States)	Jack Horbach	Senior	F	5' 11" (1.8 m)	176 lb (80 kg)	2002-05-04	Naperville, Illinois	Madison Capitols (USHL)	—
26	(United States)	Weston Knox	Sophomore	D	6' 0" (1.83 m)	181 lb (82 kg)	2004-04-06	Andover, Minnesota	Minot Minotauros (NAHL)	—
27	(United States)	Finn Brink	Freshman	F	5' 10" (1.78 m)	185 lb (84 kg)	2005-04-06	Maple Grove, Minnesota	Madison Capitols (USHL)	—
28	(United States)	Aiden Dubinsky	Senior	D	6' 0" (1.83 m)	180 lb (82 kg)	2004-04-28	Highland Park, Illinois	Minnesota Duluth (NCHC)	—
30	(Canada)	Eli Pulver	Sophomore	G	6' 1" (1.85 m)	165 lb (75 kg)	2003-03-02	Vancouver, British Columbia	Minnesota State (CCHA)	—
31	(Canada)	Daniel Hauser	Freshman	G	5' 11" (1.8 m)	165 lb (75 kg)	2004-01-29	Chestermere, Alberta	Calgary Hitmen (WHL)	—
33	(United States)	Anton Castro	Sophomore	G	6' 1" (1.85 m)	181 lb (82 kg)	2003-01-23	Mendota Heights, Minnesota	Fargo Force (USHL)	—
47	(United States)	Blake Montgomery	Freshman	F	6' 4" (1.93 m)	196 lb (89 kg)	2005-05-04	Annapolis, Maryland	London Knights (OHL)	OTT, 117th overall 2024
55	(Canada)	Oliver Tulk	Freshman	F	5' 8" (1.73 m)	174 lb (79 kg)	2005-01-19	Gibsons, British Columbia	Calgary Hitmen (WHL)	—
91	(Croatia)	Bruno Idžan	Freshman	F	6' 0" (1.83 m)	194 lb (88 kg)	2006-01-16	Zagreb, Croatia	Lincoln Stars (USHL)	OTT, 181st overall 2025
94	(Austria)	Vasily Zelenov	Freshman	F	6' 0" (1.83 m)	192 lb (87 kg)	2006-02-02	Moskva, Russia	Green Bay Gamblers (USHL)	BUF, 204th overall 2024

== Awards and honors ==
=== Hockey Hall of Fame ===
- Chris Chelios (2013)
- Bob Johnson (1992)

=== United States Hockey Hall of Fame ===
- Chris Chelios (2011)
- Bob Johnson (1991)
- Mark Johnson (2004)
- Mike Richter (2008)
- Jeff Sauer (2014)
- Gary Suter (2011)

=== NCAA ===
==== Individual awards ====
Hobey Baker Award

- Blake Geoffrion: 2010
- Cole Caufield: 2021

Derek Hines Unsung Hero Award

- Aidan Cavallini: 2017

Mike Richter Award

- Kyle McClellan: 2024

NCAA Scoring Champion

- Delbert Dehate: 1968
- Mike Eaves: 1978
- Mark Johnson: 1979
- Steven Reinprecht: 2000
- Cole Caufield: 2021

Tournament Most Outstanding Player

- Dean Talafous: 1973
- Julian Baretta: 1977
- Marc Behrend: 1981, 1983
- Chris Tancill: 1990
- Robbie Earl: 2006

==== All-Americans ====
AHCA First Team All-Americans

- 1969–70: John Jagger, D
- 1971–72: Jeff Rotsch, D
- 1974–75: Brian Engblom, D
- 1975–76: Craig Norwich, D; Mike Eaves, F
- 1976–77: Julian Baretta, G; Craig Norwich, D; Mike Eaves, F
- 1977–78: Mike Eaves, F; Mark Johnson, F
- 1978–79: Mark Johnson, F
- 1979–80: Roy Schultz, G; Theran Welsh, D
- 1981–82: Bruce Driver, D; John Newberry, F
- 1982–83: Patrick Flatley, F
- 1987–88: Paul Stanton, D; Paul Ranheim, F
- 1989–90: Gary Shuchuk, F
- 1992–93: Barry Richter, D
- 1994–95: Brian Rafalski, D
- 1999–00: Jeff Dessner, D; Steven Reinprecht, F
- 2000–01: Dany Heatley, F
- 2003–04: Bernd Brückler, G
- 2005–06: Brian Elliott, G
- 2008–09: Jamie McBain, D
- 2009–10: Brendan Smith, D; Blake Geoffrion, F
- 2010–11: Justin Schultz, D
- 2011–12: Justin Schultz, D
- 2013–14: Jake McCabe, D
- 2020–21: Cole Caufield, F

AHCA Second Team All-Americans

- 1984–85: Tim Thomas, D; Tony Granato, F
- 1986–87: Tony Granato, F
- 1987–88: Dean Anderson, G; Steve Tuttle, F
- 1988–89: Curtis Joseph, G
- 1990–91: Sean Hill, D
- 1991–92: Duane Derksen, G
- 1996–97: Kirk Daubenspeck, G
- 1999–00: Dany Heatley, F
- 2005–06: Tom Gilbert, D; Joe Pavelski, F
- 2010–11: Jake Gardiner, D
- 2013–14: Michael Mersch, F
- 2014–15: Michael Mersch, F
- 2016–17: Luke Kunin, F
- 2020–21: Dylan Holloway, F; Linus Weissbach, F
- 2023–24: Kyle McClellan, G

=== WCHA ===
==== Individual awards ====
Most Valuable Player

- Mike Eaves: 1978
- Mark Johnson: 1979
- Curtis Joseph: 1989
- Gary Shuchuk: 1990
- Duane Derksen: 1992
- Steven Reinprecht: 2000
- Jamie McBain: 2009

Freshman of the Year

- Mark Johnson: 1977
- Mike Richter: 1986
- Curtis Joseph: 1989
- Jim Carey: 1993
- Dany Heatley: 2000

Coach of the Year

- Bob Johnson: 1977

Tournament Most Outstanding Player

- Dean Anderson: 1988
- Steve Rohlik: 1990
- Kirk Daubenspeck: 1995
- Joe Bianchi: 1998
- Nic Kerdiles: 2013

Defensive player of the year

- Brian Rafalski: 1995
- Jeff Dessner: 2000
- Brendan Smith: 2010
- Justin Schultz: 2011, 2012

Student-Athlete of the Year

- Tony Granato: 1987

==== All-Conference Teams ====
First Team All-WCHA

- 1974-75: Brian Engblom, D
- 1976-77: Julian Baretta, G; Craig Norwich, D
- 1977-78: Mike Eaves, F; Mark Johnson, F
- 1978-79: Mark Johnson, F
- 1979-80: Roy Schultz, G
- 1981-82: Bruce Driver, D; John Newberry, F
- 1982-83: Patrick Flatley, F
- 1984-85: Tim Thomas, D
- 1987-88: Paul Ranheim, F
- 1988-89: Curtis Joseph, G; Paul Stanton, D
- 1989-90: Gary Shuchuk, F
- 1991-92: Duane Derksen, G
- 1992-93: Barry Richter, D
- 1993-94: Kelly Fairchild, F
- 1994-95: Brian Rafalski, D
- 1997-98: Craig Anderson, D
- 1999-00: Jeff Dessner, D; Dany Heatley, F; Steven Reinprecht, F
- 2003-04: Bernd Brückler, G
- 2005-06: Tom Gilbert, D
- 2008-09: Jamie McBain, D
- 2009-10: Brendan Smith, D; Blake Geoffrion, F
- 2010-11: Justin Schultz, D
- 2011-12: Justin Schultz, D

Second Team All-WCHA

- 1969-70: Wayne Thomas, G; John Jagger, D; Murray Heatley, F
- 1970-71: John Jagger, D; Murray Heatley, F
- 1971-72: Jim Makey, G
- 1972-73: Jim Makey, G; Norm Cherrey, F
- 1975-76: Craig Norwich, D
- 1976-77: John Taft, F; Mike Eaves, F
- 1977-78: Julian Baretta, G
- 1978-79: Bob Suter, D
- 1979-80: Theran Welsh, D
- 1980-81: Theran Welsh, D
- 1981-82: Marc Behrend, G
- 1982-83: Bruce Driver, D; Chris Chelios, D; Paul Houck, F
- 1984-85: Tony Granato, F
- 1985-86: Marty Wiitala, D
- 1986-87: Mike Richter, G; Paul Ranheim, F; Tony Granato, F
- 1987-88: Dean Anderson, G; Paul Stanton, D; Steve Tuttle, F
- 1988-89: John Byce, F
- 1989-90: Duane Derksen, G; Sean Hill, D; John Byce, F
- 1990-91: Duane Derksen, G; Sean Hill, D
- 1992-93: Jim Carey, G
- 1993-94: Andrew Shier, F
- 1996-97: Kirk Daubenspeck, G
- 1997-98: Steven Reinprecht, F
- 2000-01: Dany Heatley, F
- 2004-05: Bernd Brückler, G; Robbie Earl, F
- 2005-06: Brian Elliott, G; Joe Pavelski, F
- 2006-07: Brian Elliott, G
- 2009-10: Ryan McDonagh, D
- 2010-11: Jake Gardiner, D

=== Big Ten ===
==== Individual awards ====
Player of the Year

- Cole Caufield: 2021

Freshman of the Year

- Trent Frederic: 2017
- Cole Caufield: 2020

Goaltender of the Year

- Kyle McClellan, 2024

Coach of the Year

- Tony Granato: 2017, 2021

Scoring Champion

- Cole Caufield: 2020, 2021

Tournament Most Outstanding Player

- Mark Zengerle: 2014

==== All-Conference Teams ====
First Team All-Big Ten

- 2013–14: Jake McCabe, D; Michael Mersch, F; Mark Zengerle, F
- 2019–20: Wyatt Kalynuk, D; Cole Caufield, F
- 2020–21: Cole Caufield, F; Dylan Holloway, F
- 2023–24: Kyle McClellan, G
- 2025–26: Ben Dexheimer, D

Second team All-Big Ten

- 2013–14: Joe Rumpel, G; Frankie Simonelli, D; Nic Kerdiles, F
- 2016–17: Jake Linhart, D; Trent Frederic, F; Luke Kunin, F
- 2018–19: Wyatt Kalynuk, D
- 2020–21: Linus Weissbach, F
- 2024–25: Quinn Finley, F

Big Ten All-Rookie Team

- 2015–16: Luke Kunin, F
- 2016–17: Trent Frederic, F
- 2017–18: Wyatt Kalynuk, D; Linus Weissbach, F
- 2018–19: K'Andre Miller, F
- 2019–20: Cole Caufield, F
- 2020–21: Cameron Rowe, G
- 2024–25: Logan Hensler, D; Gavin Morrissey, F
- 2025–26: Luke Osburn, D

== Wisconsin Badgers Hall of Fame ==
The following is a list of people associated with the Wisconsin men's ice hockey program who were elected into the University of Wisconsin Athletic Hall of Fame (induction date in parentheses).

- Steve Alley (2001)
- Marc Behrend (2006)
- Chris Chelios (2011)
- Delbert Dehate (2007)
- Bruce Driver (2016)
- Mike Eaves (1992)
- Brian Elliott (2017)
- Tony Granato (2000)
- Bill Howard (2019)
- Jim Johannson (2018)
- Bob Johnson (1992)
- Mark Johnson (1991)
- Craig Norwich (2008)
- Brian Rafalski (2015)
- Steven Reinprecht (2014)
- Mike Richter (2005)
- Jeff Sauer (2016)
- Bob Suter (2017)
- Dean Talafous (2013)
- Theran Welsh (2010)

== Badgers in the NHL ==
As of July 1, 2025.

= NHL All-Star team	= NHL All-Star	= NHL All-Star and NHL All-Star team	= Hall of Famers

Player	Position	Team(s)	Years	Games	Stanley Cups
Steve Alley	Left wing	HFD	1979–1981	15	0
Marc Behrend	Goaltender	WPG	1983–1986	39	0
Mike Blaisdell	Right wing	DET, NYR, PIT, TOR	1980–1989	343	0
Rene Bourque	Right wing	CHI, CGY, MTL, ANA, CBJ, COL	2005–2017	725	0
Alex Brooks	Defenseman	NJD	2006–2007	19	0
Adam Burish	Right wing	CHI, DAL, SJS	2006–2015	378	1
John Byce	Right wing	BOS	1989–1992	21	0
Jim Carey	Goaltender	WSH, BOS, STL	1994–1999	172	0
Cole Caufield	Right wing	MTL	2021–Present	287	0
Chris Chelios	Defenseman	MTL, CHI, DET, ATL	1983–2010	1,651	3
Steve Clippingdale	Left wing	LAK, WSH	1976–1980	19	0
Jake Dowell	Center	CHI, DAL, MIN	2007–2014	157	0
Davis Drewiske	Center	LAK, MTL	2008–2013	135	1
Bruce Driver	Defenseman	NJD, NYR	1983–1998	922	1
Bruce Eakin	Center	CGY, DET	1983–1986	13	0
Robbie Earl	Left wing	TOR, MIN	2007–2011	47	0
Mike Eaves	Forward	MNS, CGY	1978–1986	324	0
Brian Elliott	Goaltender	OTT, COL, STL, CGY, PHI, TBL	2007–2023	542	0
Ty Emberson	Defenseman	SJS, EDM	2023–Present	106	0
Brian Engblom	Defenseman	MTL, WSH, LAK, BUF, CGY	1976–1987	659	2
Brian Fahey	Defenseman	WSH	2010–2011	7	0
Kelly Fairchild	Center	TOR, DAL, COL	1995–2002	34	0
Patrick Flatley	Right wing	NYI, NYR	1983–1997	780	0
Trent Frederic	Center	BOS, EDM	2018–Present	338	0
Jake Gardiner	Defenseman	TOR, CAR	2011–2021	645	0
Blake Geoffrion	Left wing	NSH, MTL	2010–2012	55	0
Tom Gilbert	Defenseman	EDM, MIN, FLA, MTL, LAK	2006–2017	655	0
Cody Goloubef	Defenseman	CBJ, COL, OTT, DET	2011–2020	160	0
Tony Granato	Left wing	NYR, LAK, SJS	1988–2001	774	0
Dany Heatley	Left wing	ATL, OTT, SJS, MIN, ANA	2001–2015	869	0
Sean Hill	Defenseman	MTL, ANA, OTT, CAR, STL, FLA, NYI, MIN	1990–2008	876	1
Dylan Holloway	Left wing	EDM, STL	2021–Present	166	0
Paul Houck	Right wing	MNS	1985–1988	16	0
Cameron Hughes	Center	BOS, DAL	2019–Present	5	0
Matt Hussey	Center	PIT, DET	2003–2007	21	0
John Johannson	Forward	NJD	1983–1984	5	0
Mark Johnson	Defenseman	PIT, MNS, HFD, STL, NJD	1976–1987	669	0
Curtis Joseph	Goaltender	STL, EDM, TOR, DET, PHO, CGY	1989–2009	943	0
Andrew Joudrey	Center	CBJ	2011–2012	1	0
Wyatt Kalynuk	Defenseman	CHI	2020–2022	26	0
Nic Kerdiles	Left wing	ANA	2016–2018	3	0
Terry Kleisinger	Goaltender	NYR	1985–1986	4	0
Luke Kunin	Center	MIN, NSH, SJS, CBJ	2017–Present	434	0
Joseph LaBate	Left wing	VAN	2016–Present	19	0
Doug MacDonald	Center	BUF	1992–1995	11	0
David Maley	Left wing	MTL, NJD, EDM, SJS, NYI	1985–1994	466	1

Player	Position	Team(s)	Years	Games	Stanley Cups
Jamie McBain	Left wing	CAR, BUF, LAK, ARI	2009–2017	348	0
Jake McCabe	Defenseman	BUF, CHI, TOR	2013–Present	643	0
Ryan McDonagh	Defenseman	NYR, TBL, NSH	2010–Present	1,010	2
Mike Meeker	Center	PIT	1978–1979	4	0
Scott Mellanby	Right wing	PHI, EDM, FLA, STL, ATL	1978–1986	1,431	0
Michael Mersch	Forward	LAK	2015–2016	17	0
K'Andre Miller	Defenseman	NYR, CAR	2020–Present	368	1
Brian Mullen	Forward	WPG, NYR, SJS, NYI	1982–1993	832	0
John Newberry	Forward	MTL, HFD	1982–1986	22	0
Craig Norwich	Defenseman	WPG, STL, COR	1979–1981	104	0
Mark Osiecki	Defenseman	CGY, OTT, WPG, MNS	1991–1993	93	0
Joe Pavelski	Center	SJS, DAL	2006–2024	1,332	0
Joe Piskula	Defenseman	LAK, CGY, NSH	2006–2015	13	0
Dan Plante	Right wing	NYI	1993–1998	159	0
Victor Posa	Defenseman	CHI	1985–1986	2	0
Brian Rafalski	Defenseman	NJD, DET	1999–2011	833	3
John Ramage	Defenseman	CGY, CBJ	2014–2016	2	0
Paul Ranheim	Left wing	CGY, HFD, CAR, PHI, PHO	1988–2003	1,013	0
Steven Reinprecht	Center	LAK, COL, CGY, PHO, FLA	1999–2011	663	1
Barry Richter	Right wing	NYR, BOS, NYI, MTL	1995–2001	151	0
Mike Richter	Goaltender	NYR	1988–2003	666	1
Shaun Sabol	Defenseman	PHI	1989–1990	2	0
Peter Scamurra	Defenseman	WSH	1975–1980	132	0
Justin Schultz	Defenseman	EDM, PIT, WSH, SEA	2012–2024	745	2
Steve Short	Defenseman	LAK, DET	1977–1979	6	0
Gary Shuchuk	Center	DET, LAK	1990–1996	142	0
Jack Skille	Right wing	CHI, FLA, CBJ, COL, VAN	2007–2017	368	0
Brendan Smith	Defenseman	DET, NYR, CAR, NJD, DAL	2011–Present	726	0
Craig Smith	Right wing	NSH, BOS, WSH, DAL, CHI, DET	2011–Present	987	0
Paul Stanton	Defenseman	PIT, BOS, NYI	1990–1995	295	2
Derek Stepan	Center	NYR, ARI, OTT, CAR	2010–2023	890	0
Ben Street	Left wing	CGY, COL, DET, ANA, NJD	2012–2020	59	0
Gary Suter	Defenseman	CGY, CHI, PHO, SJS	1985–2002	1,145	1
Ryan Suter	Defenseman	NSH, MIN, DAL, STL	2005–Present	1,526	0
John Taft	Defenseman	DET	1978–1979	15	0
Dean Talafous	Forward	ATF, MNS, NYR	1974–1982	497	0
David Tanabe	Defenseman	CAR, PHO, BOS	1999–2008	449	0
Chris Tancill	Right wing	HFD, DET, DAL, SJS	1990–1998	134	0
Wayne Thomas	Goaltender	MTL, TOR, NYR	1972–1981	243	0
Alex Turcotte	Center	LAK	2021–Present	100	0
Kyle Turris	Center	PHO, OTT, NSH, EDM	2007–2022	753	0
Steve Tuttle	Right wing	STL	1988–1991	144	0
Brad Winchester	Defenseman	EDM, DAL, STL, ANA, SJS	2005–2011	390	0
Brendan Woods	Center	CAR	2014–2016	7	0
Andy Wozniewski	Defenseman	TOR, STL, BOS	2005–2010	79	0
Jason Zent	Left wing	OTT, PHI	1996–1999	27	0

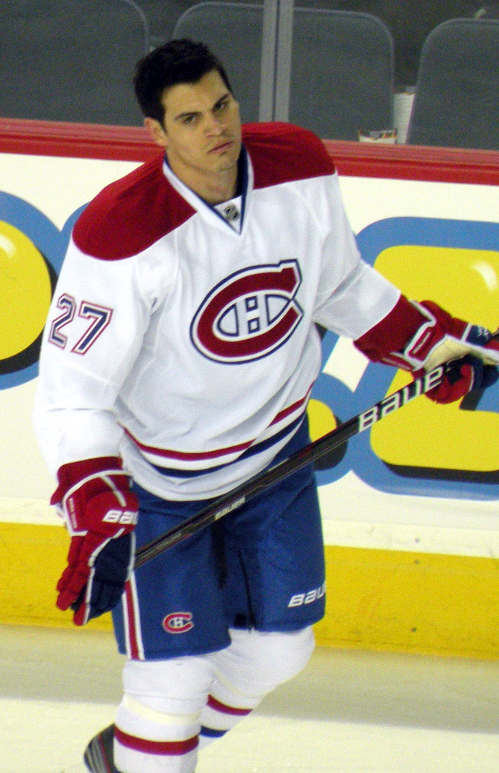
Rene Bourque

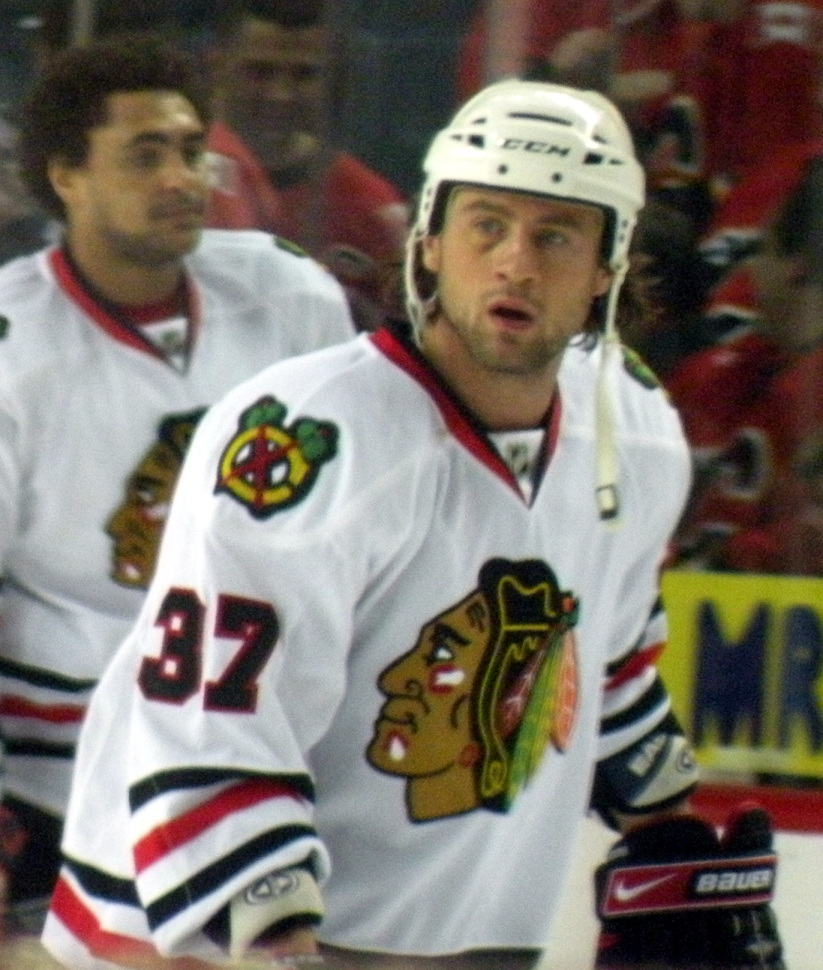
Adam Burish

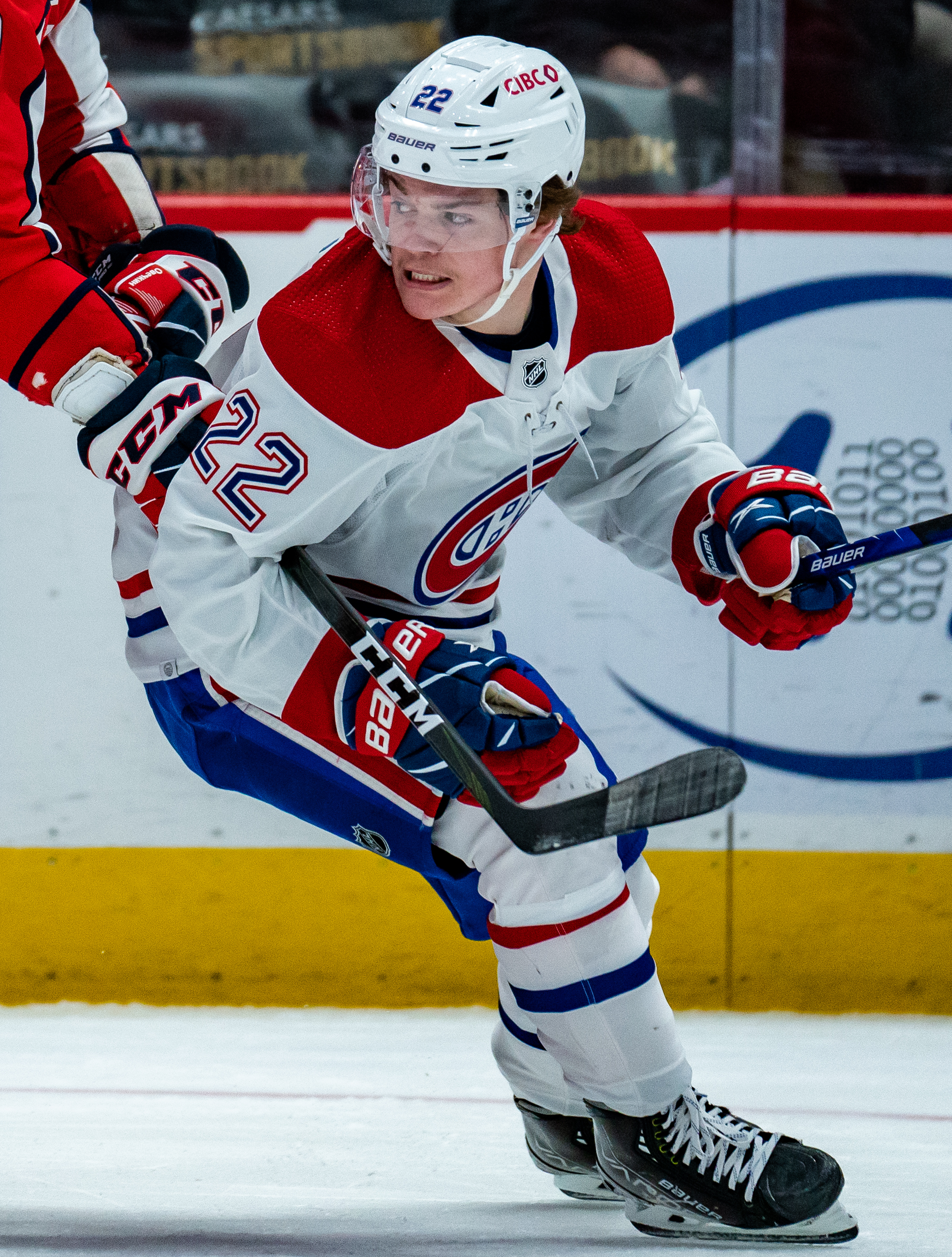
Cole Caufield

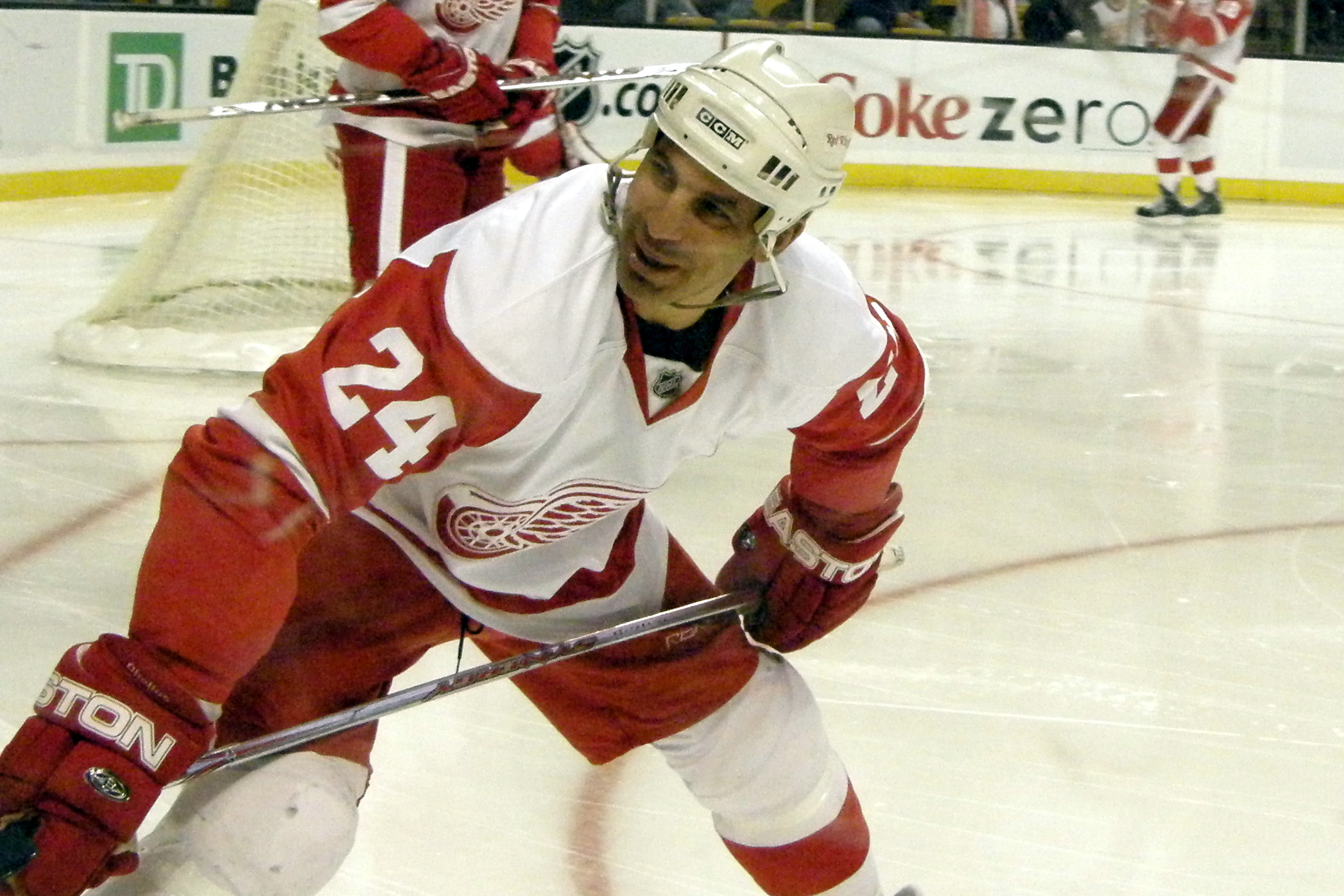
Chris Chelios

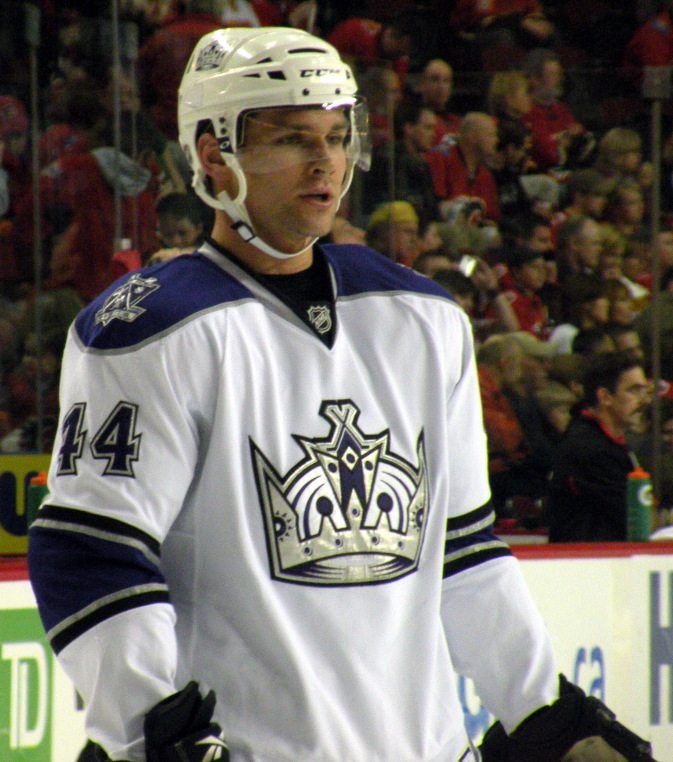
Davis Drewiske

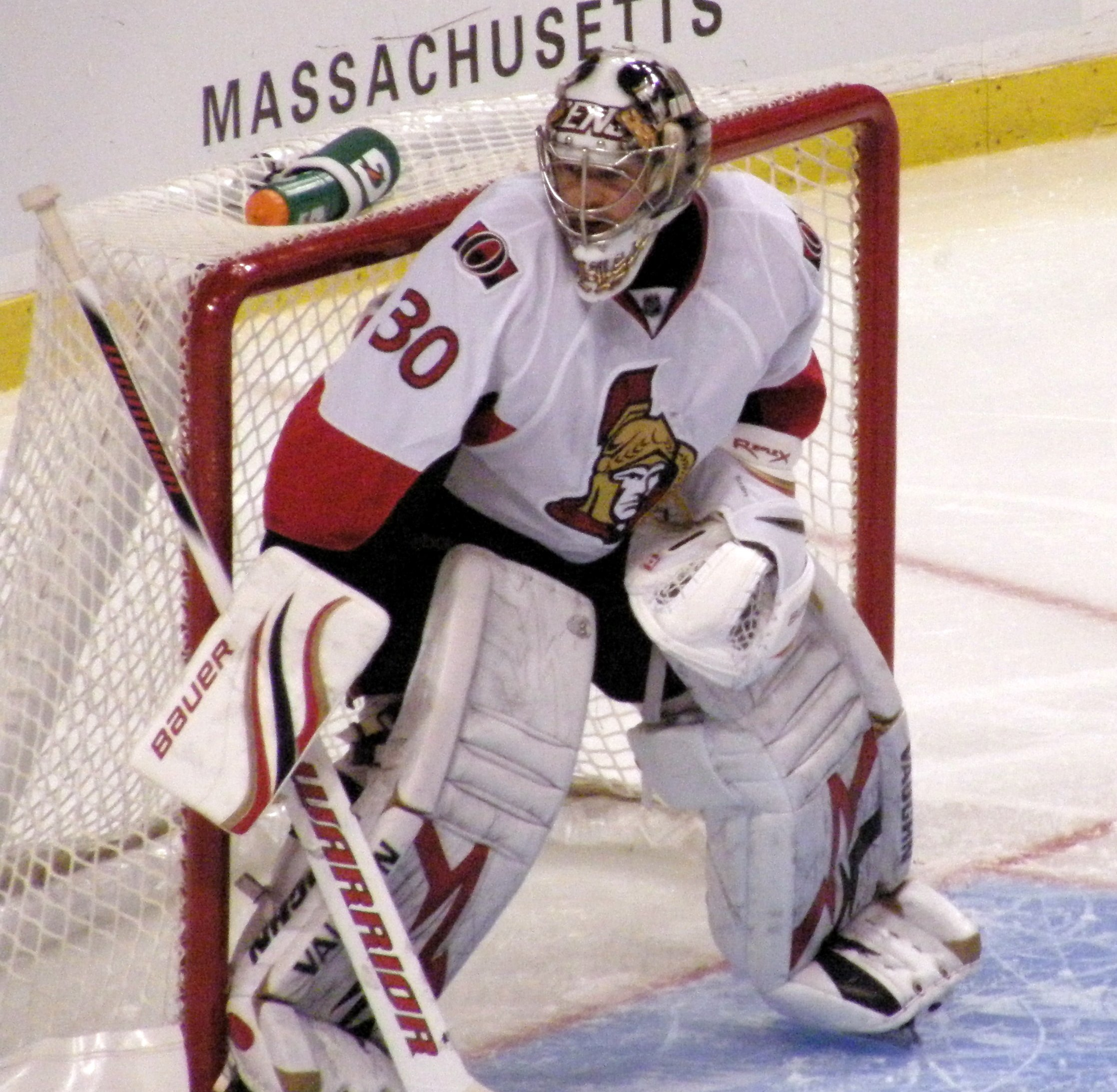
Brian Elliott

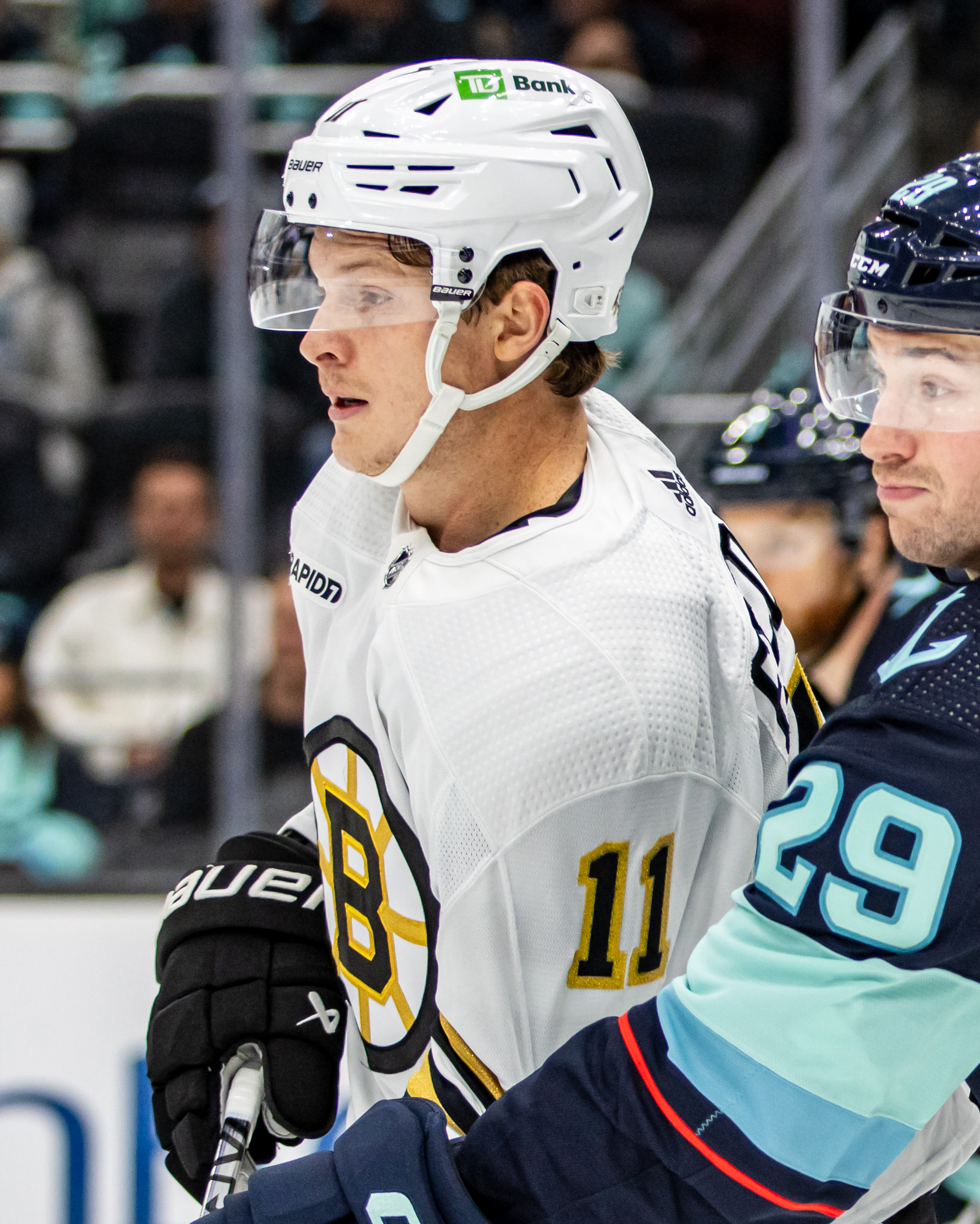
Trent Frederic

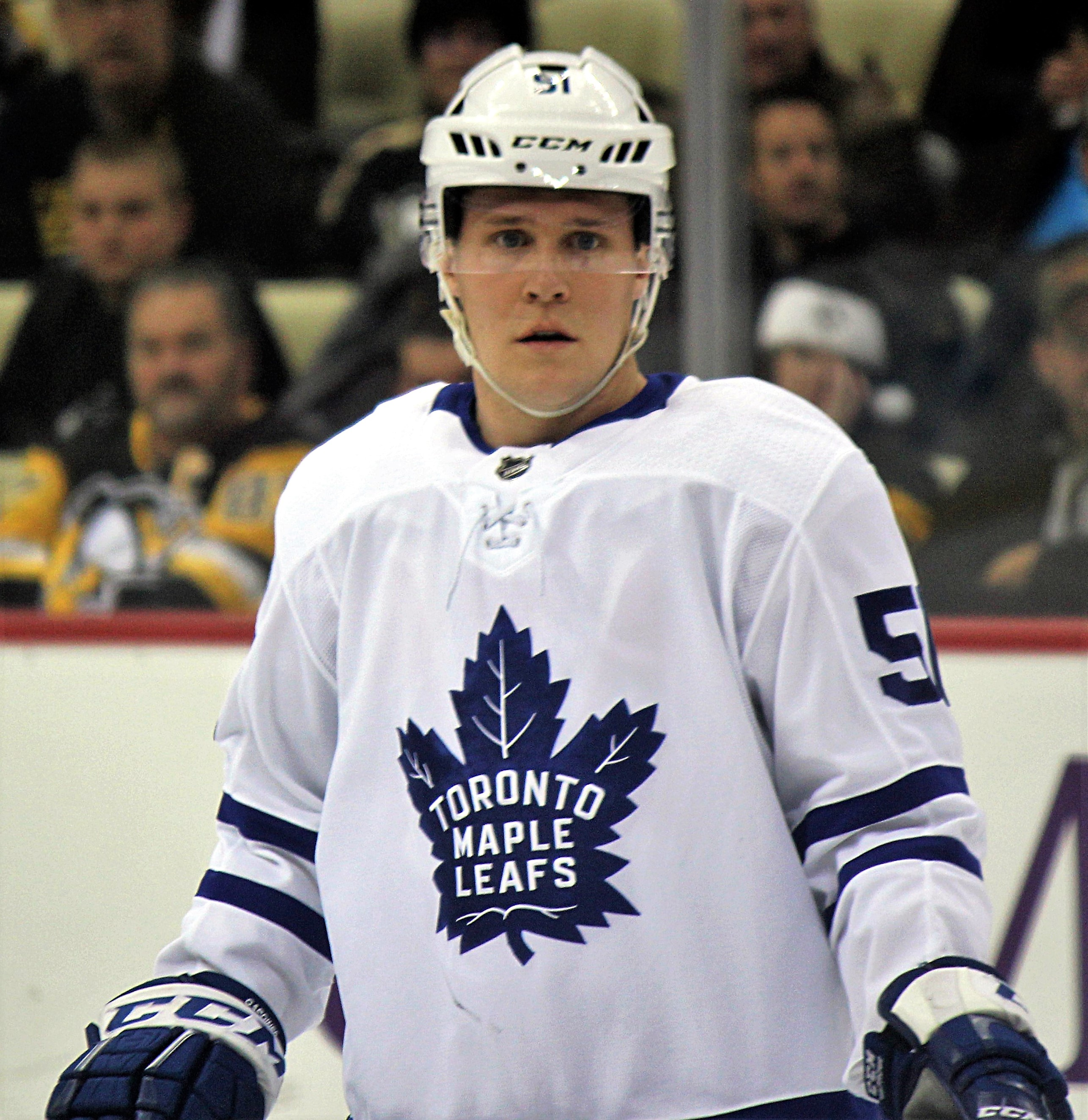
Jake Gardiner

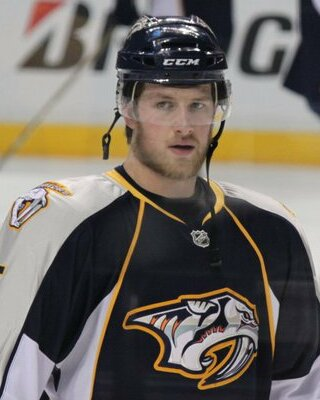
Blake Geoffrion

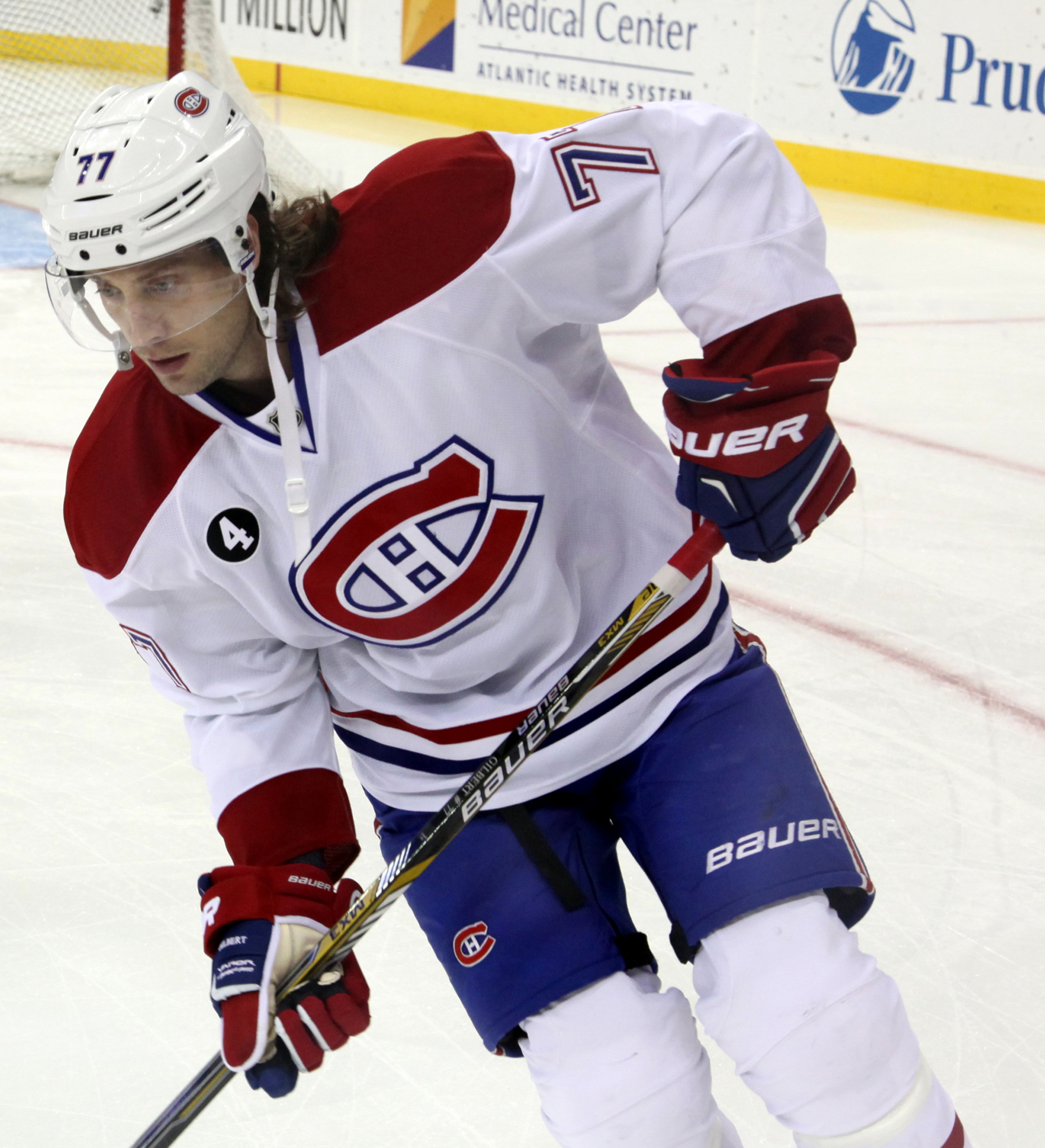
Tom Gilbert

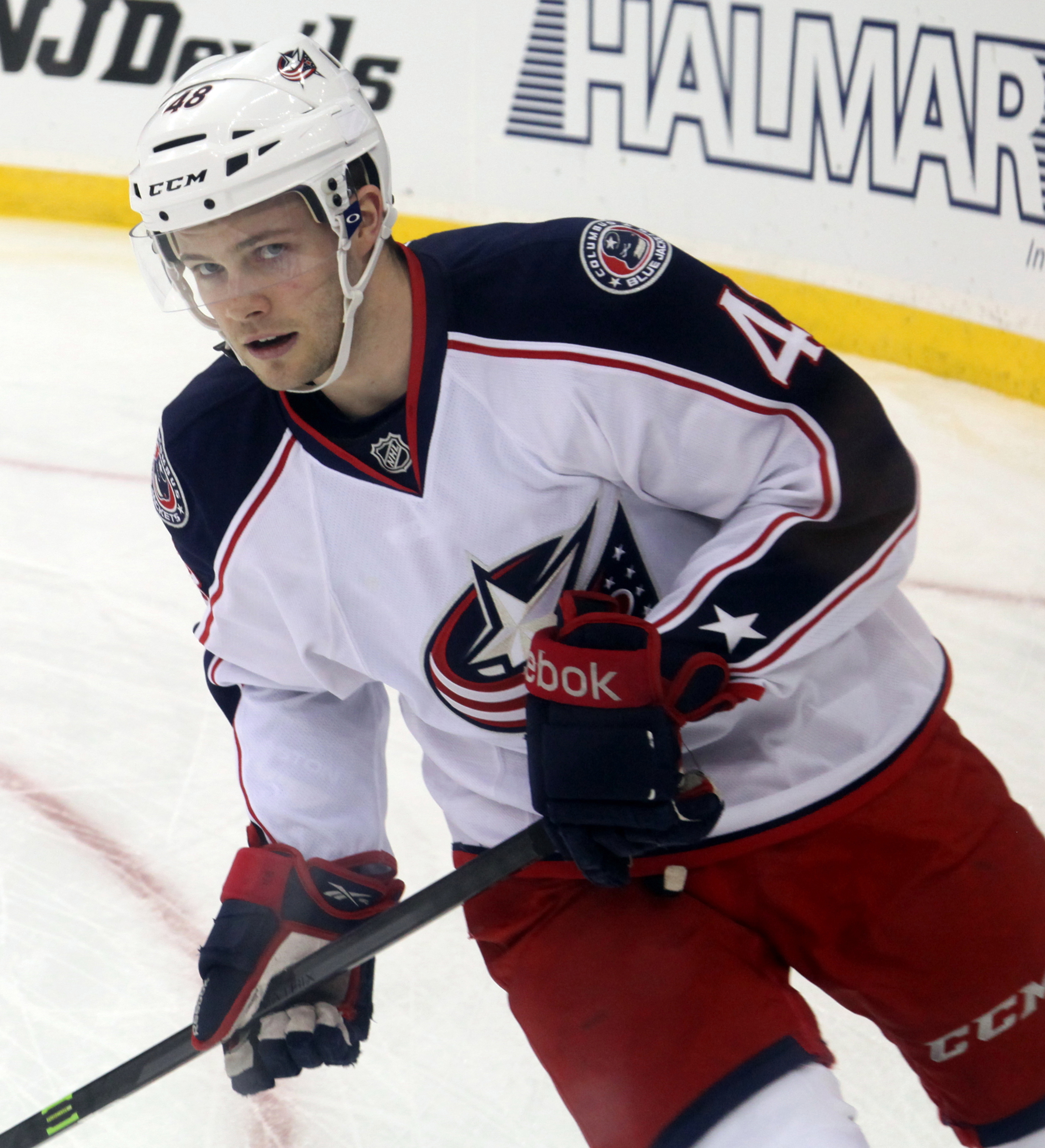
Cody Goloubef

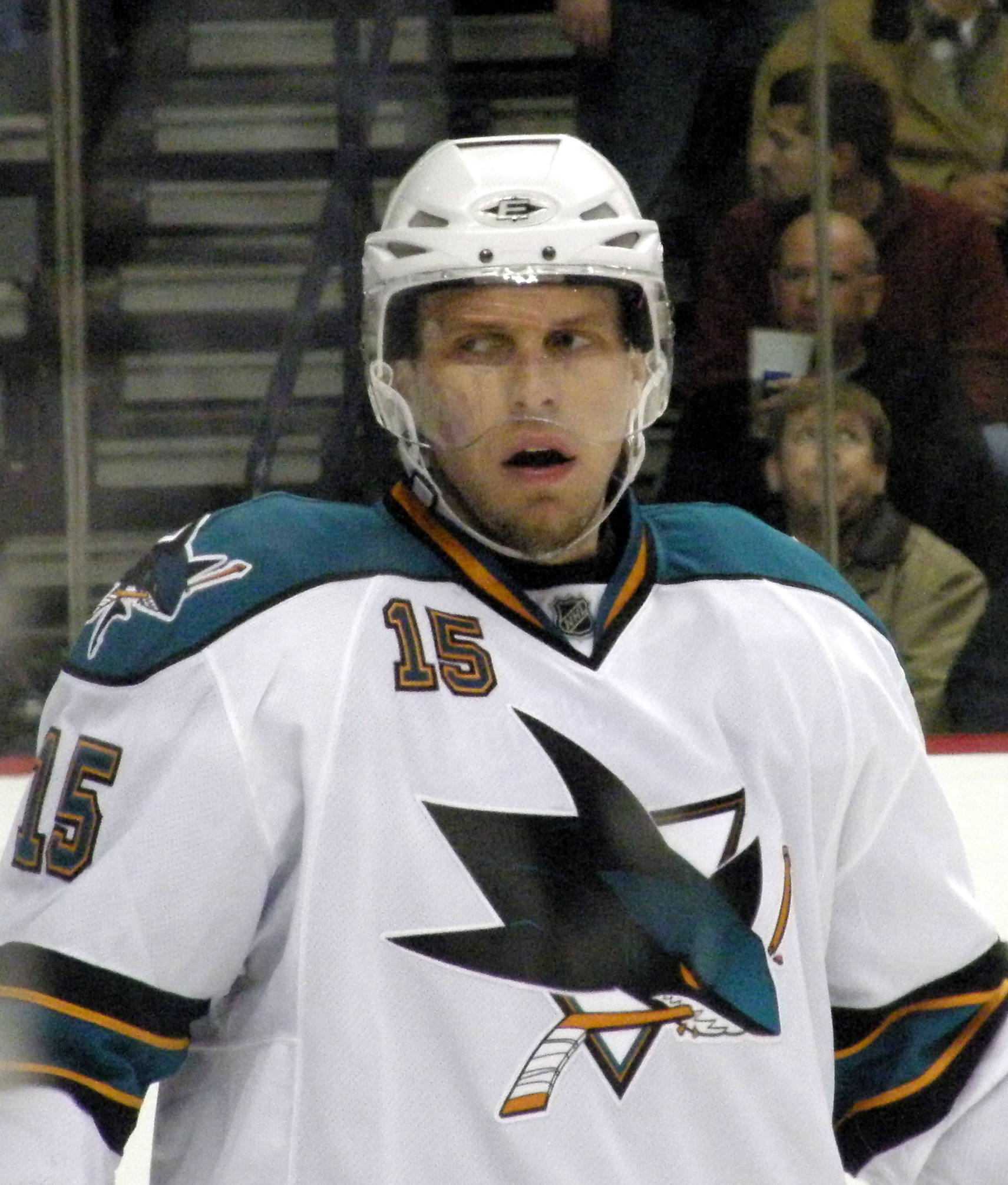
Dany Heatley

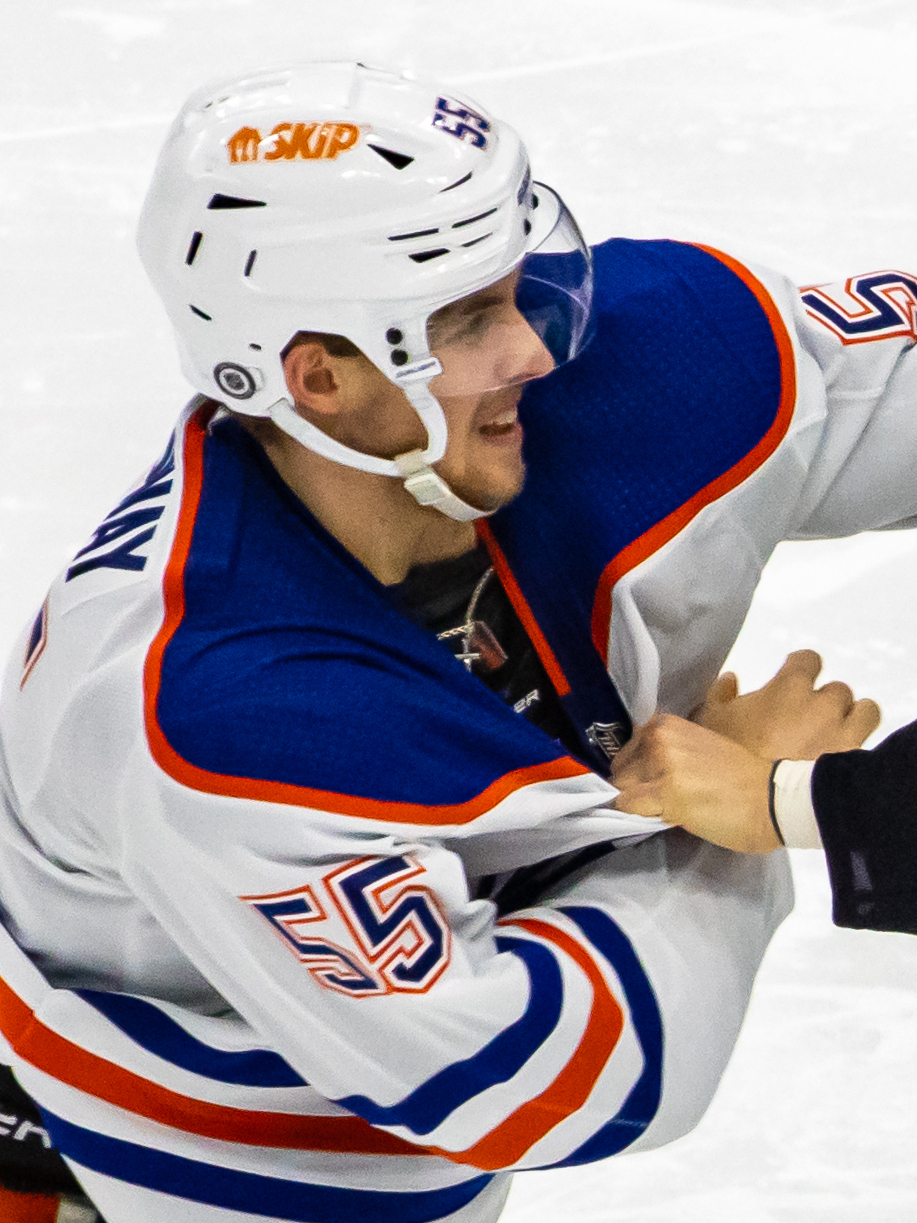
Dylan Holloway

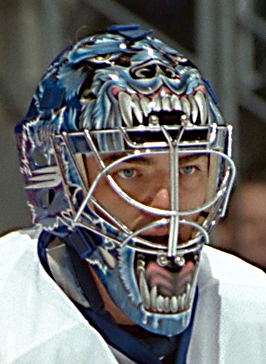
Curtis Joseph

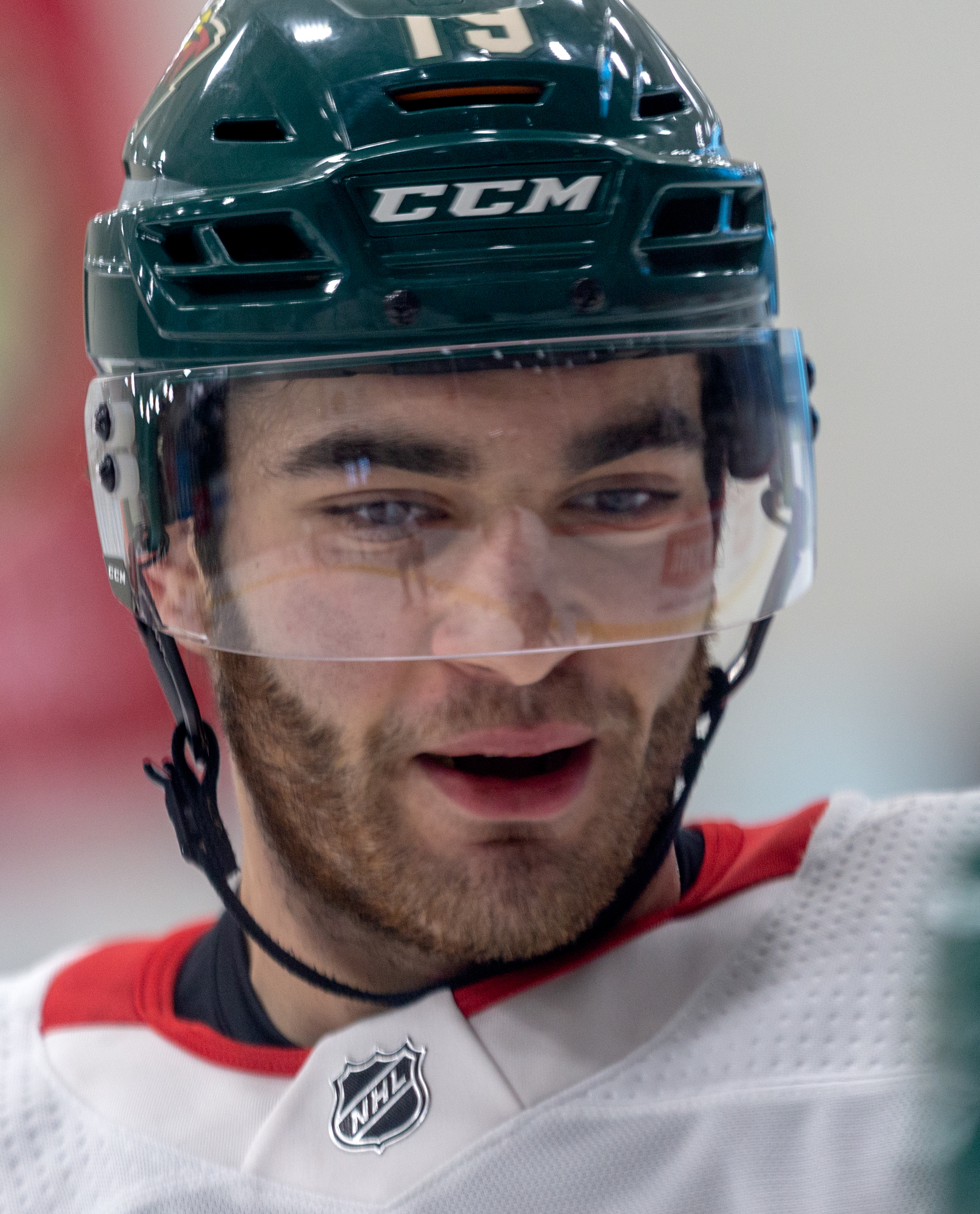
Luke Kunin

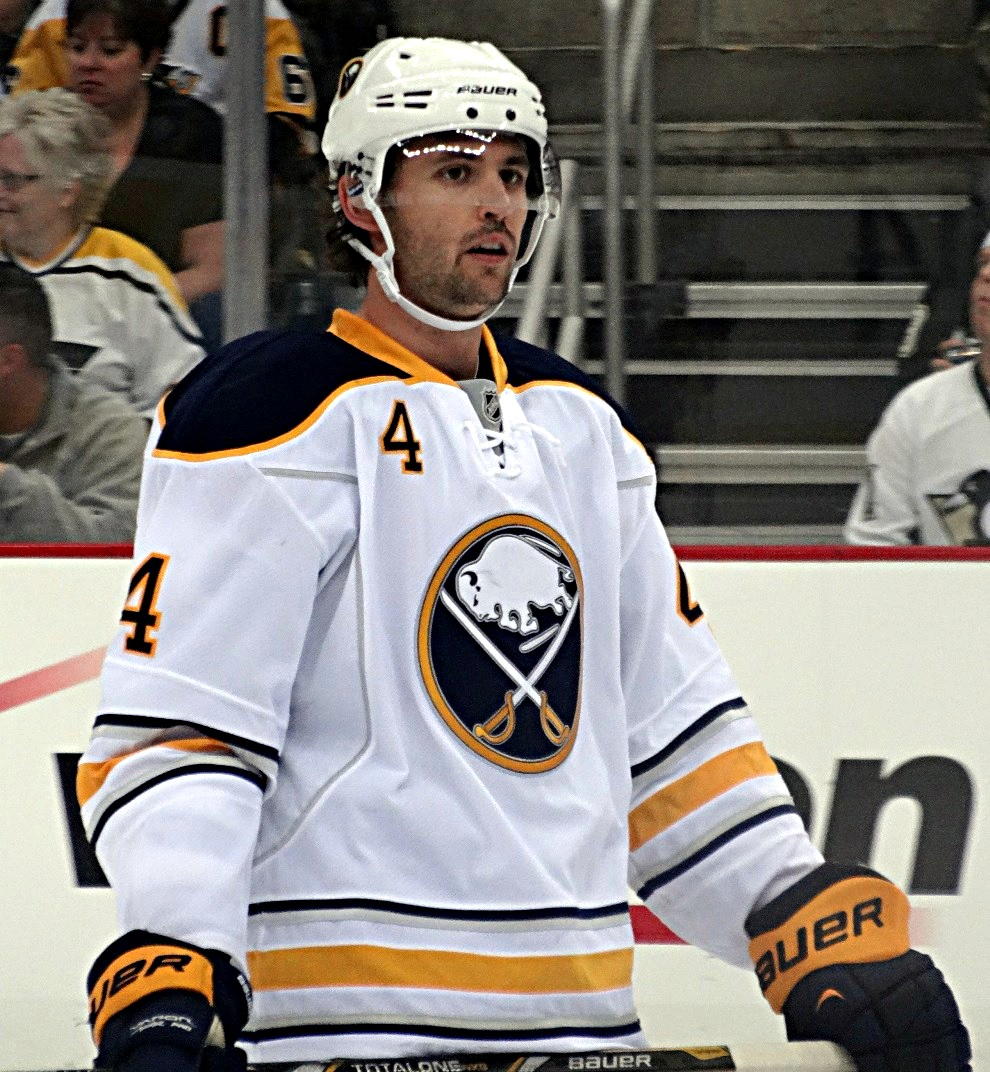
Jamie McBain

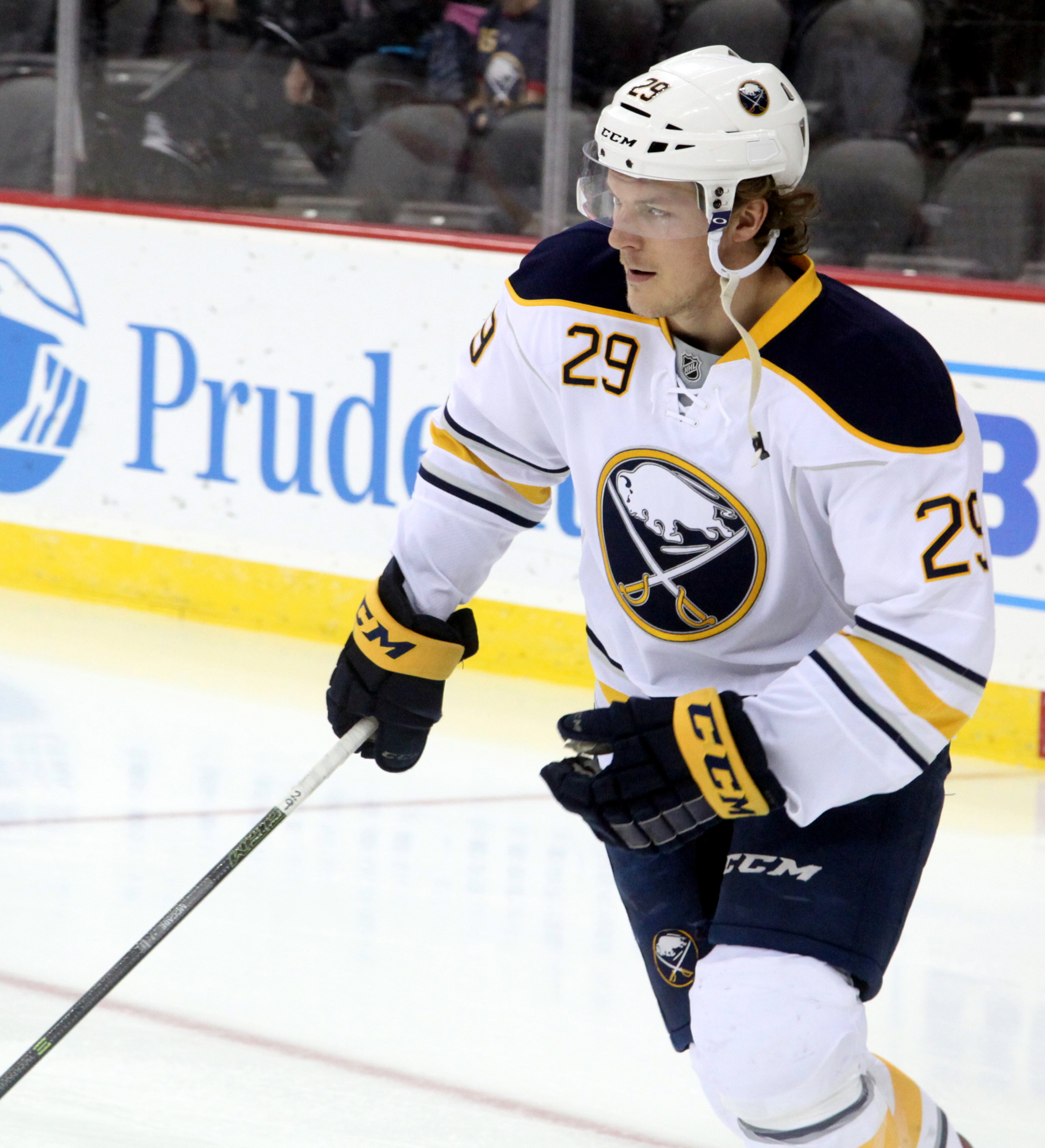
Jake McCabe

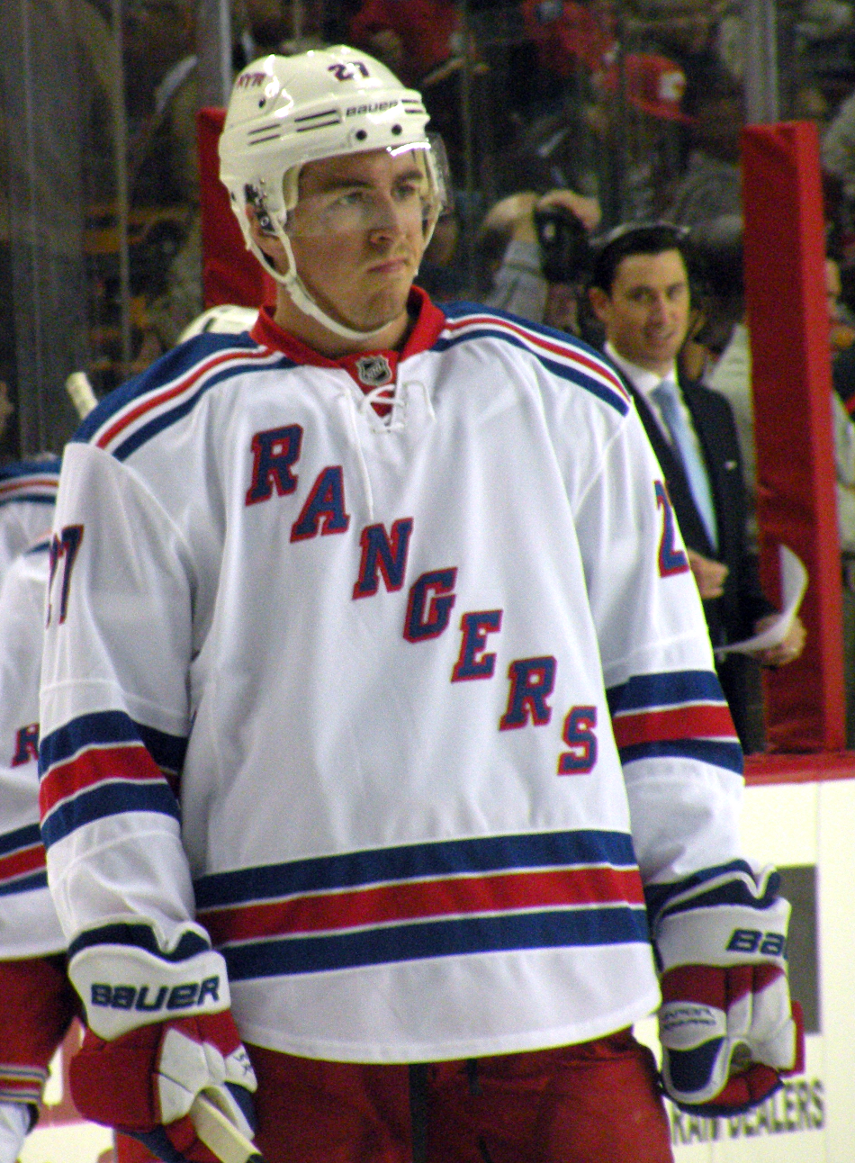
Ryan McDonagh

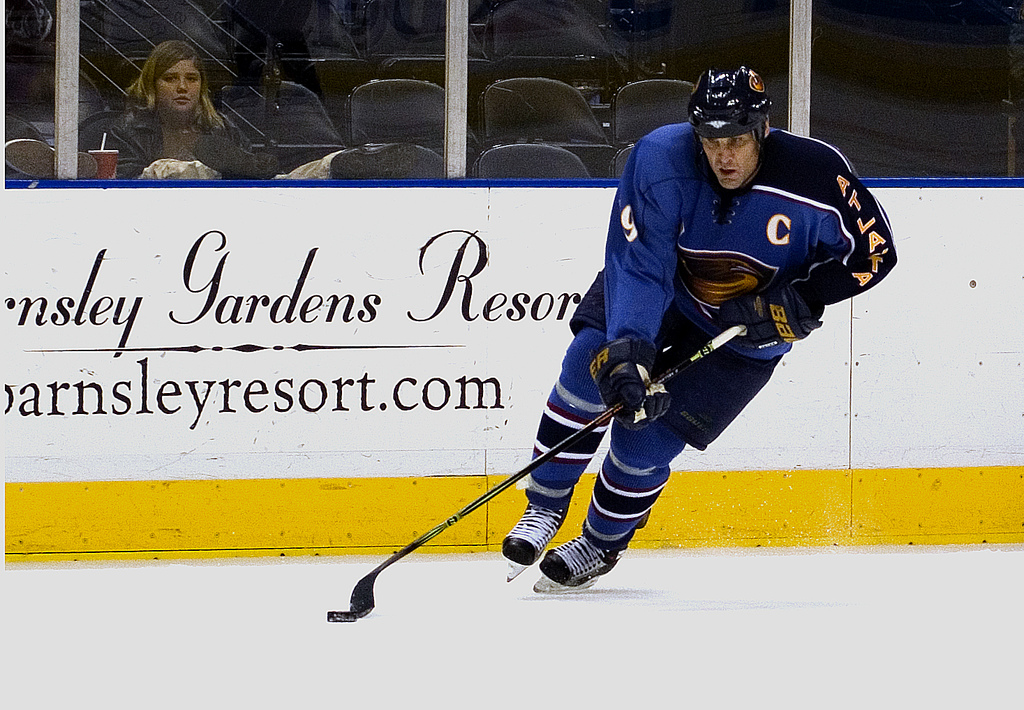
Scott Mellanby

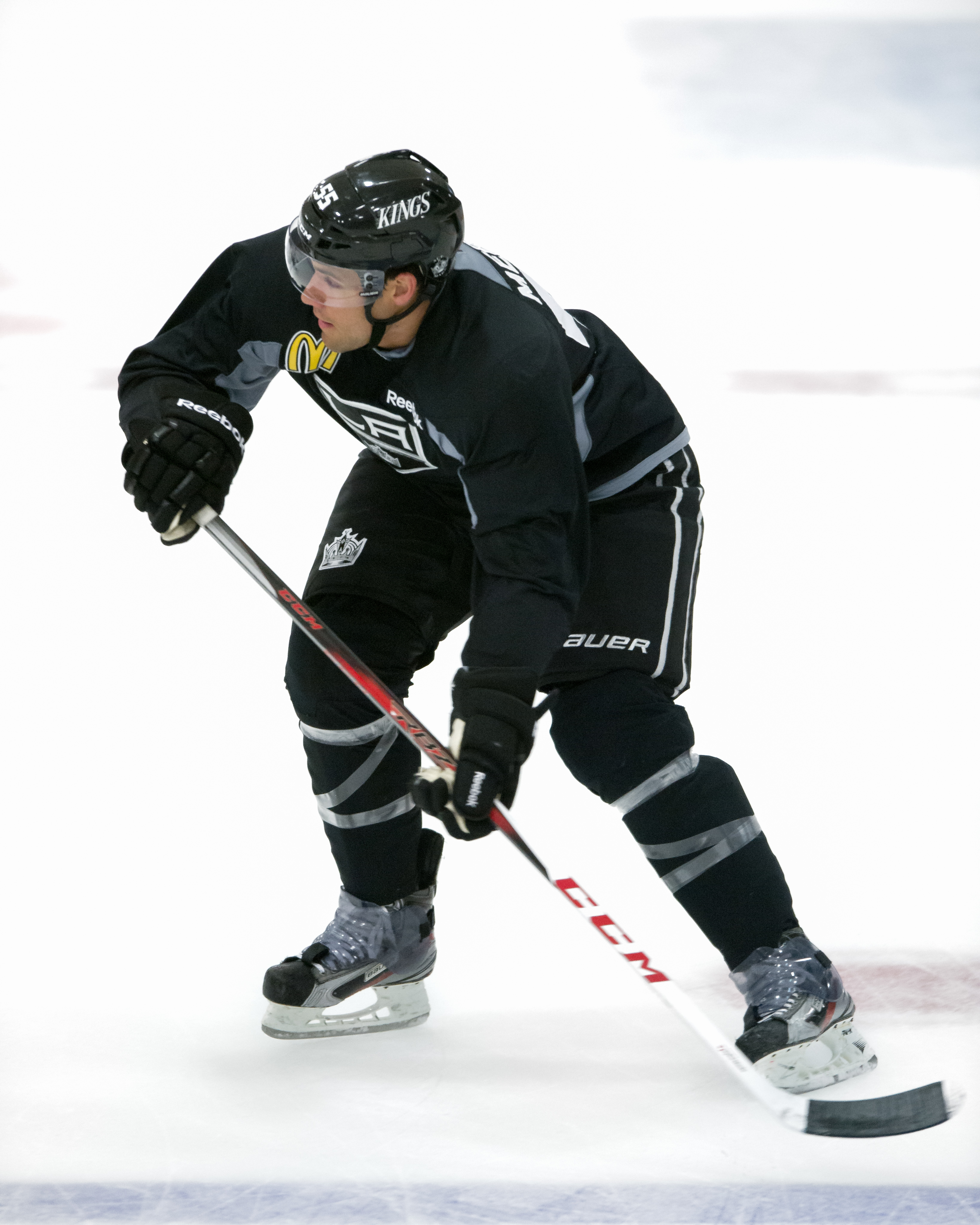
Michael Mersch

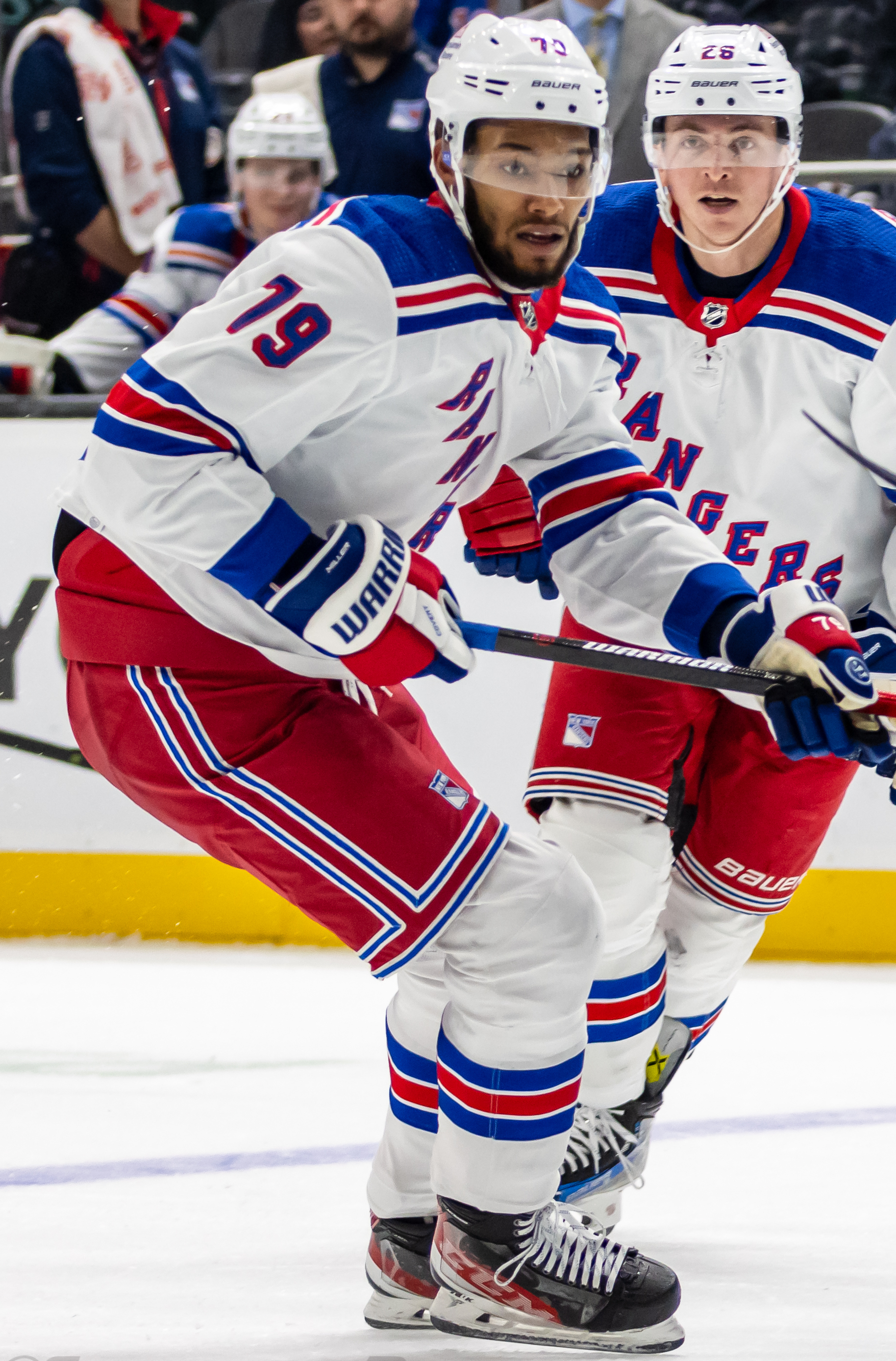
K'Andre Miller

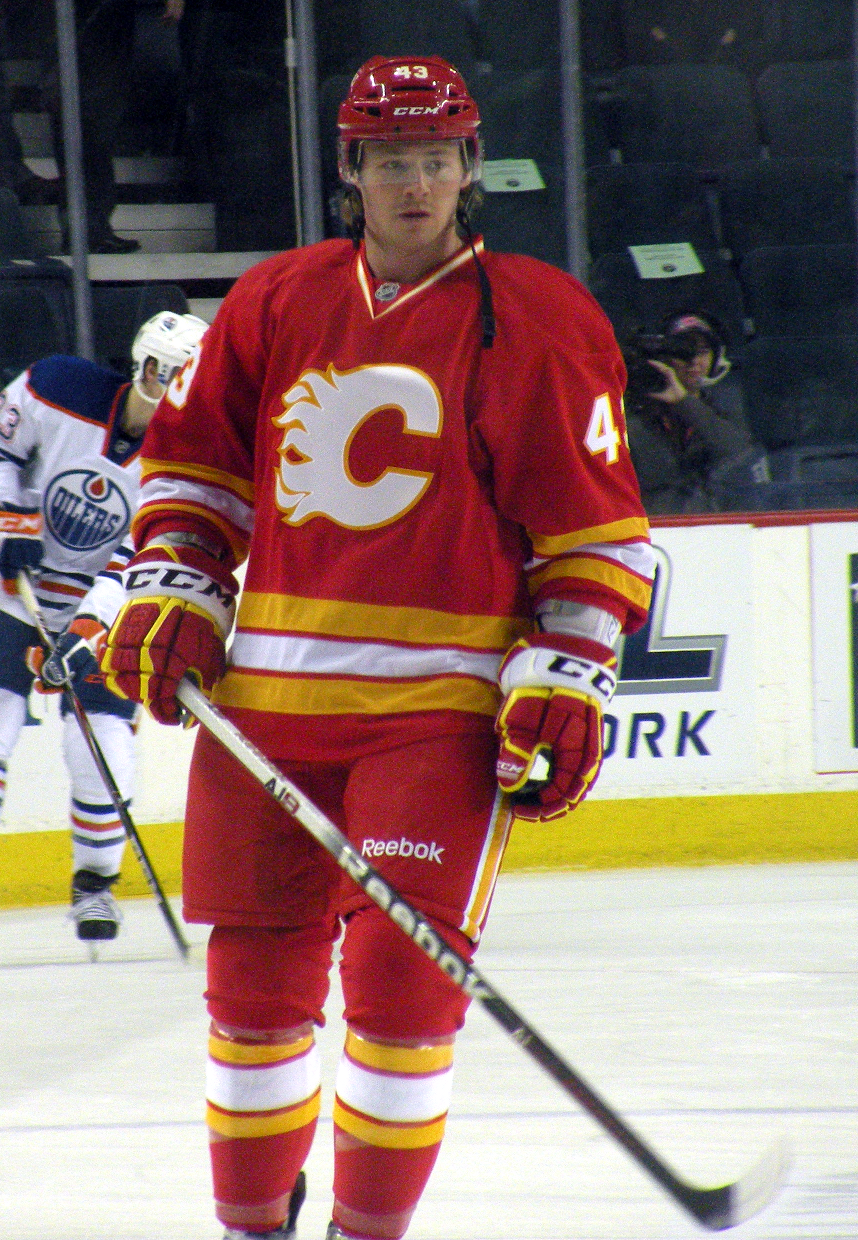
Joe Piskula

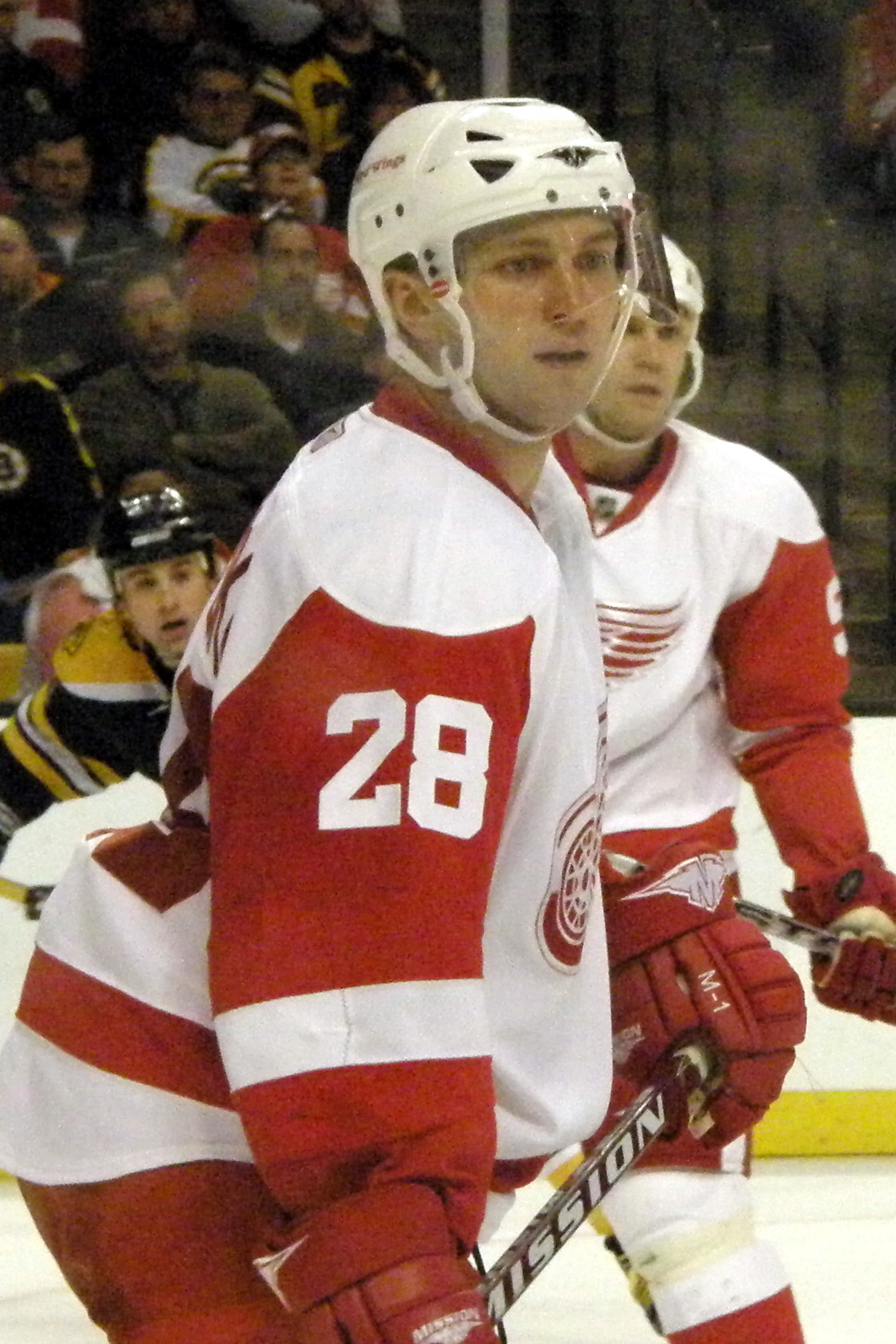
Brian Rafalski

Peter Scamurra

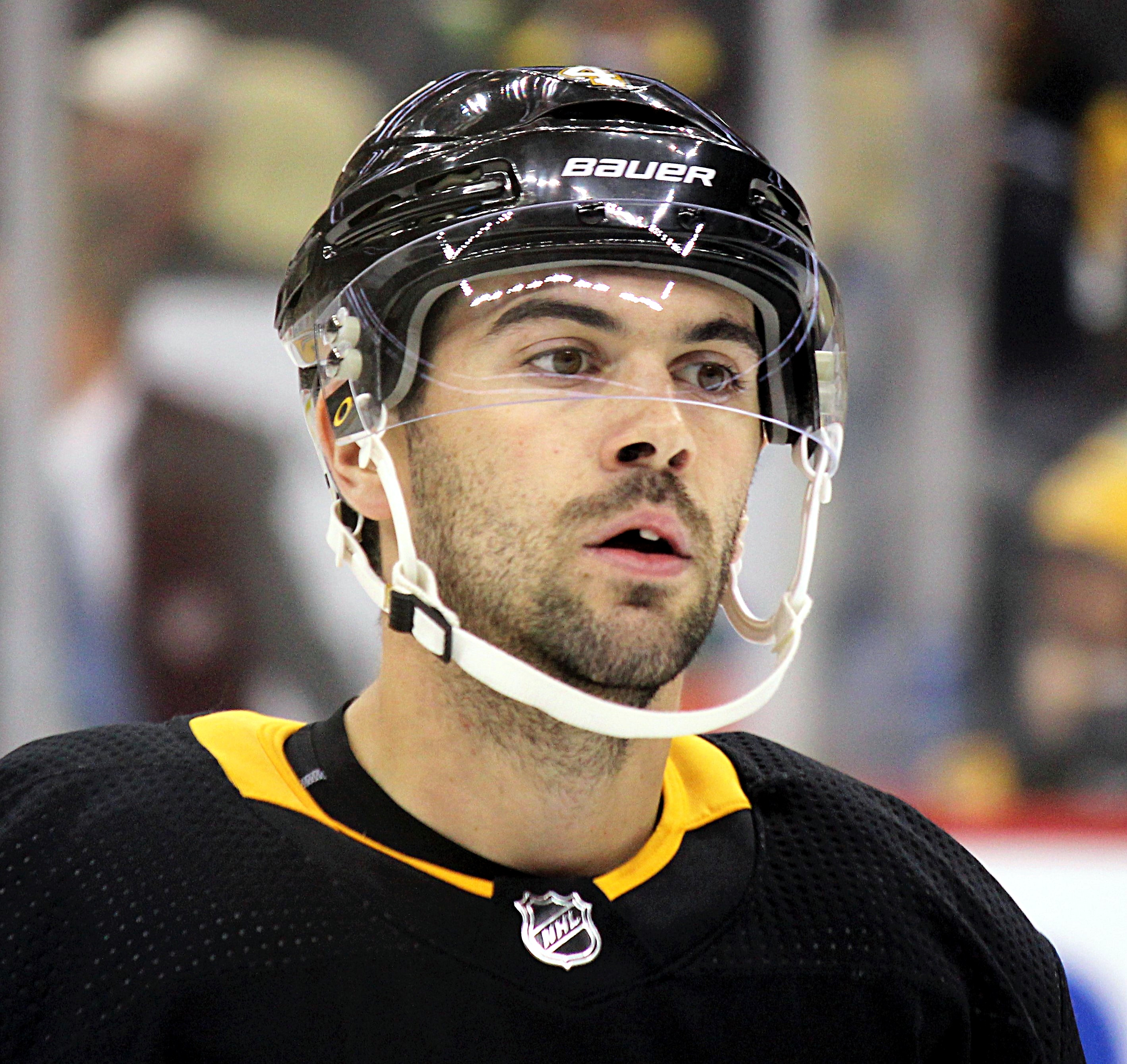
Justin Schultz

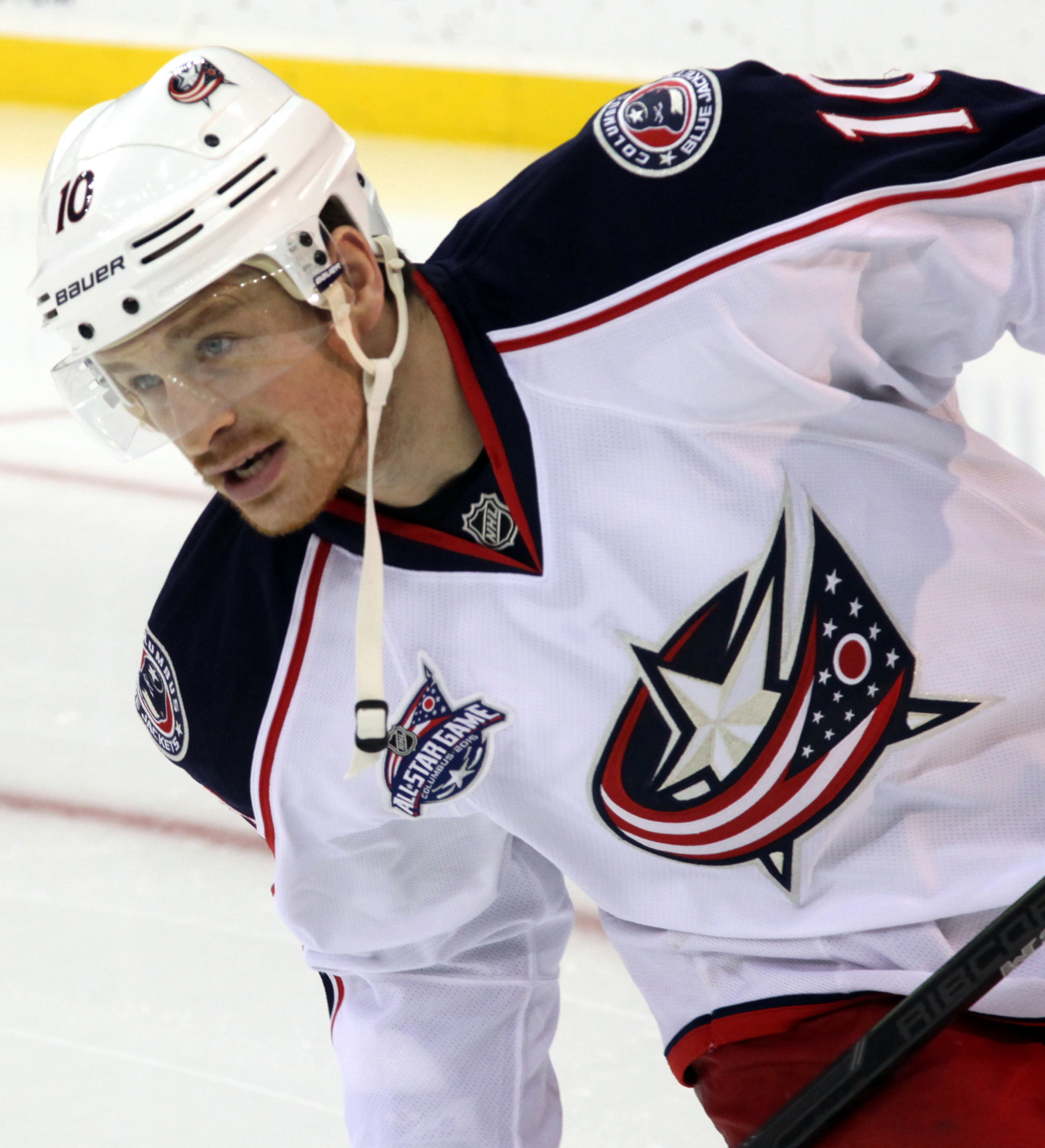
Jack Skille

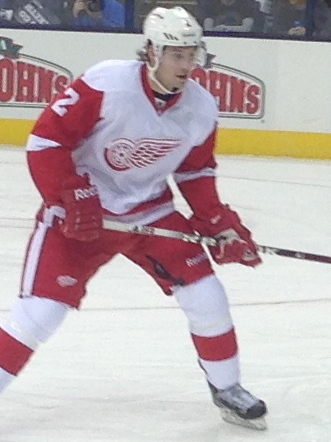
Brendan Smith

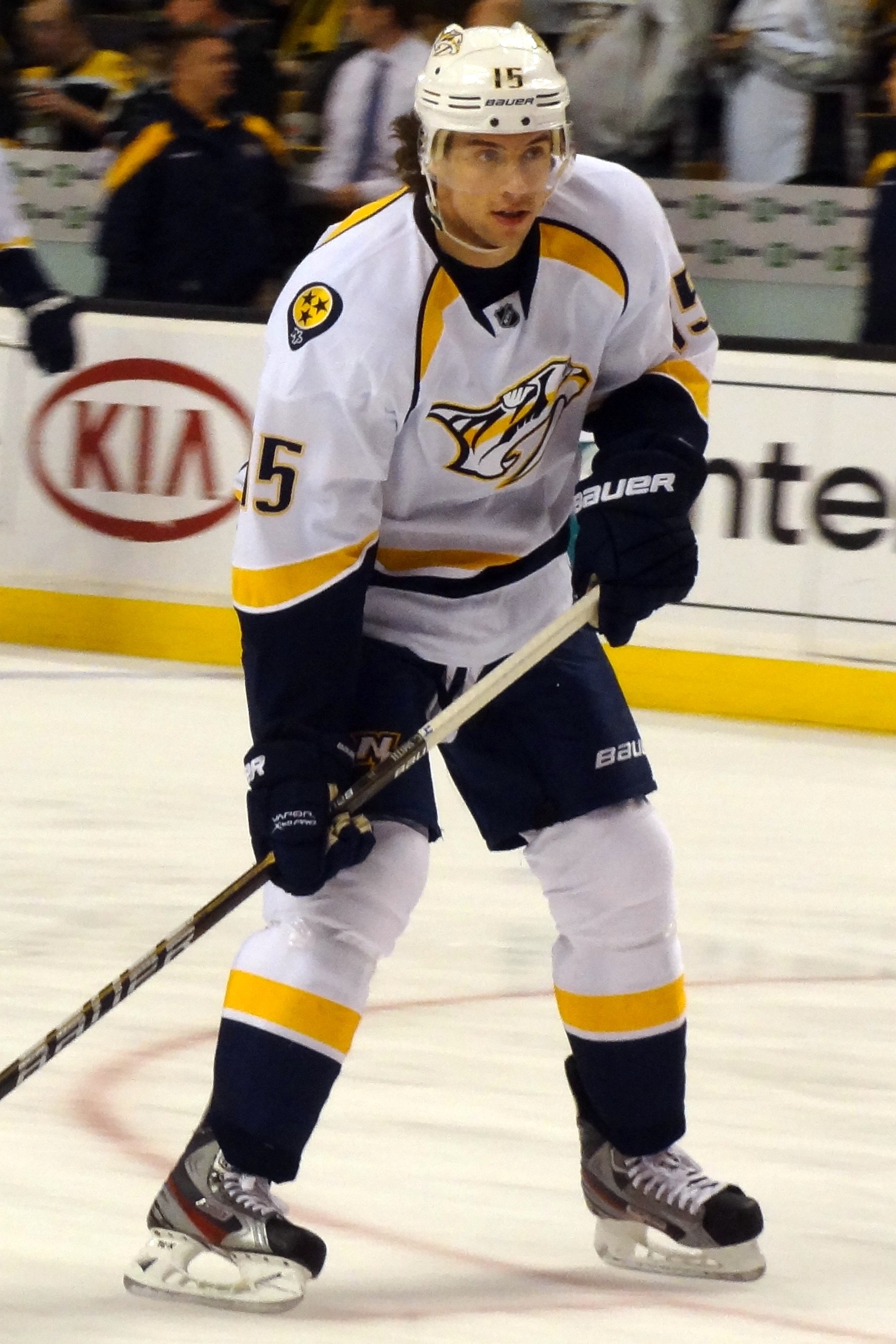
Craig Smith

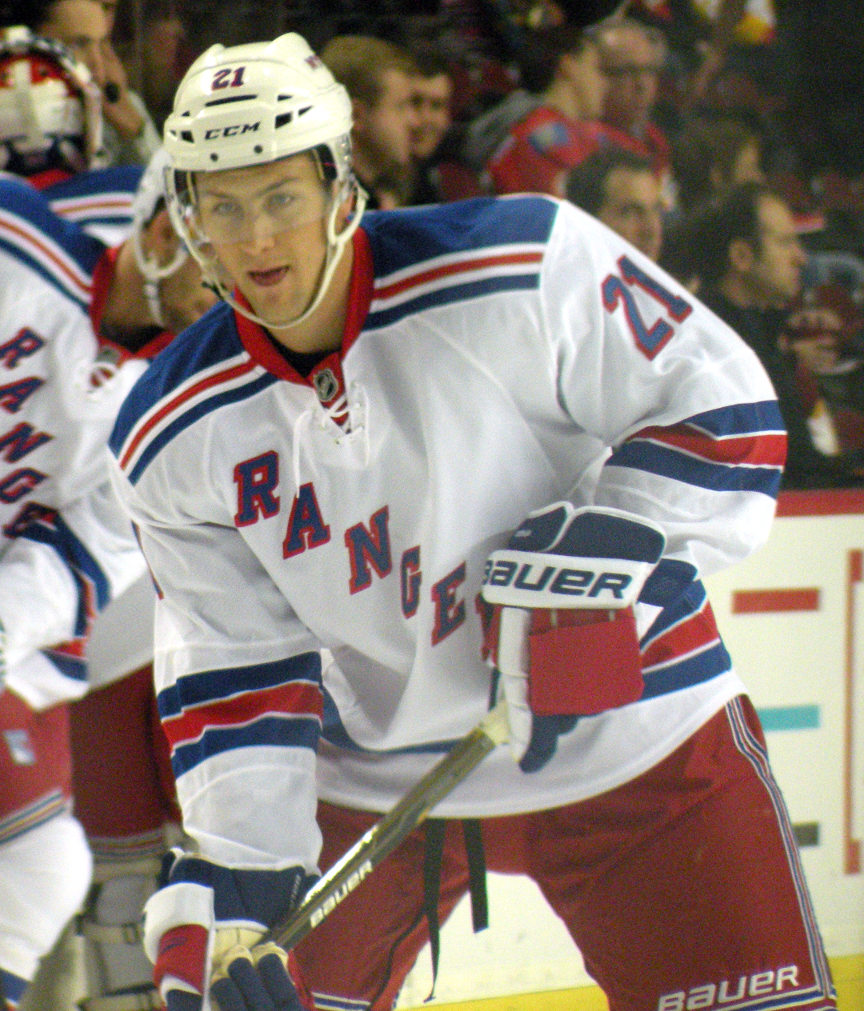
Derek Stepan

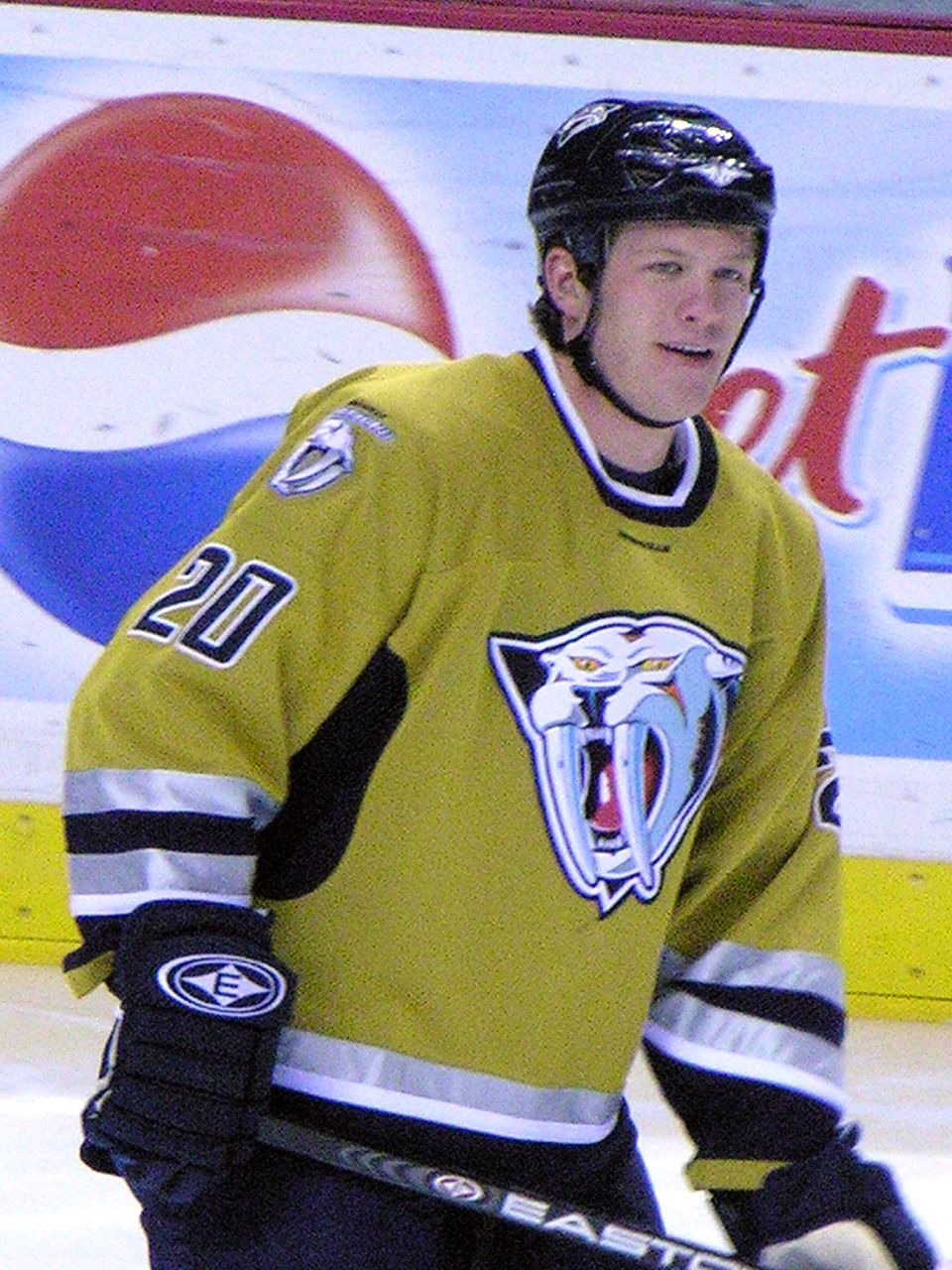
Ryan Suter

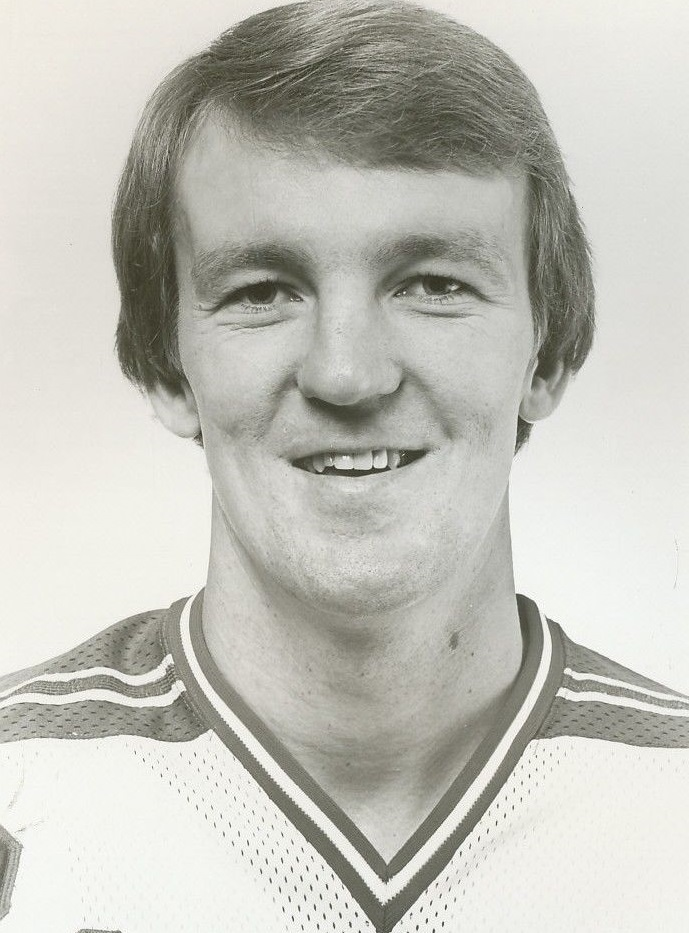
Dean Talafous

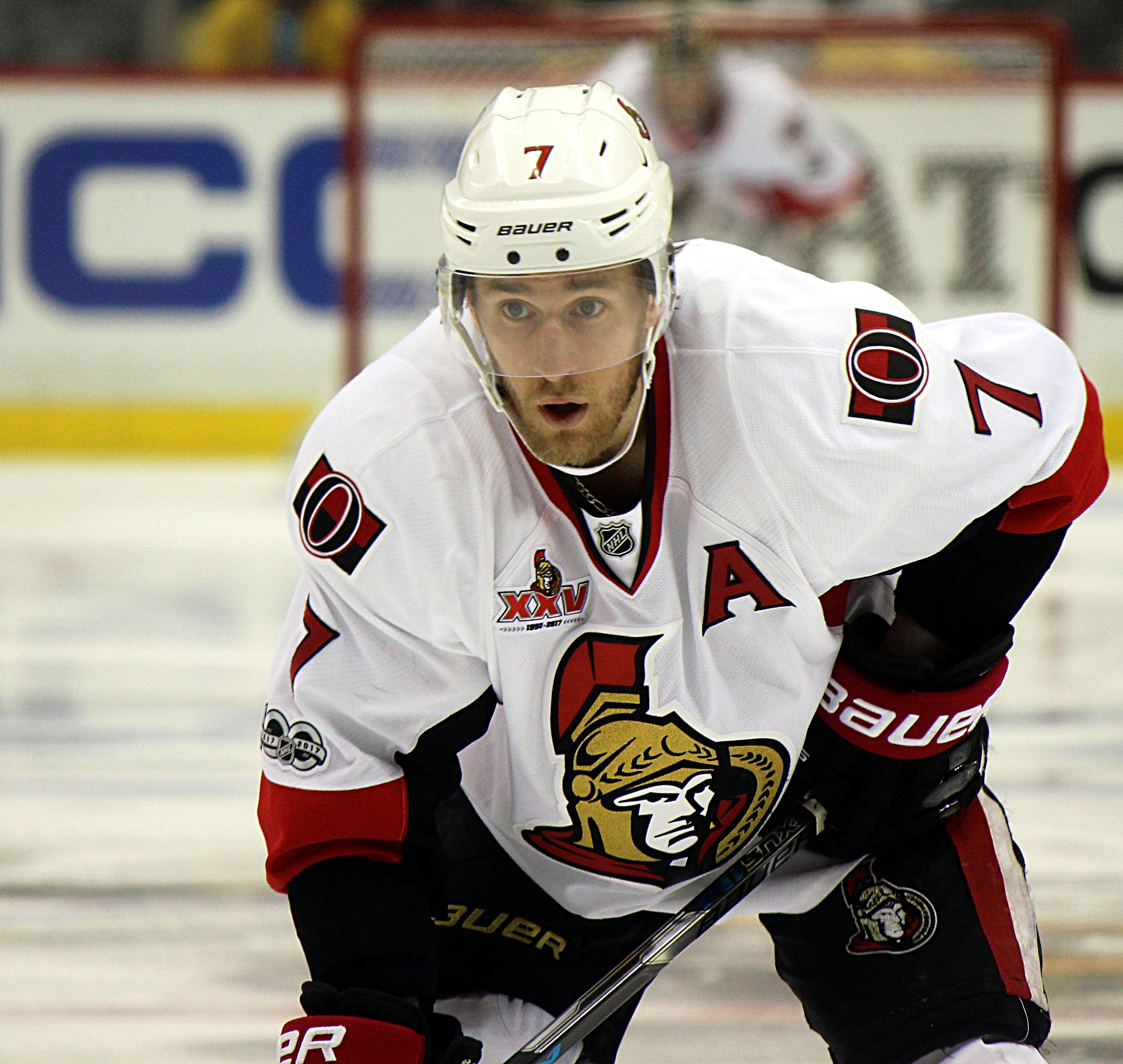
Kyle Turris

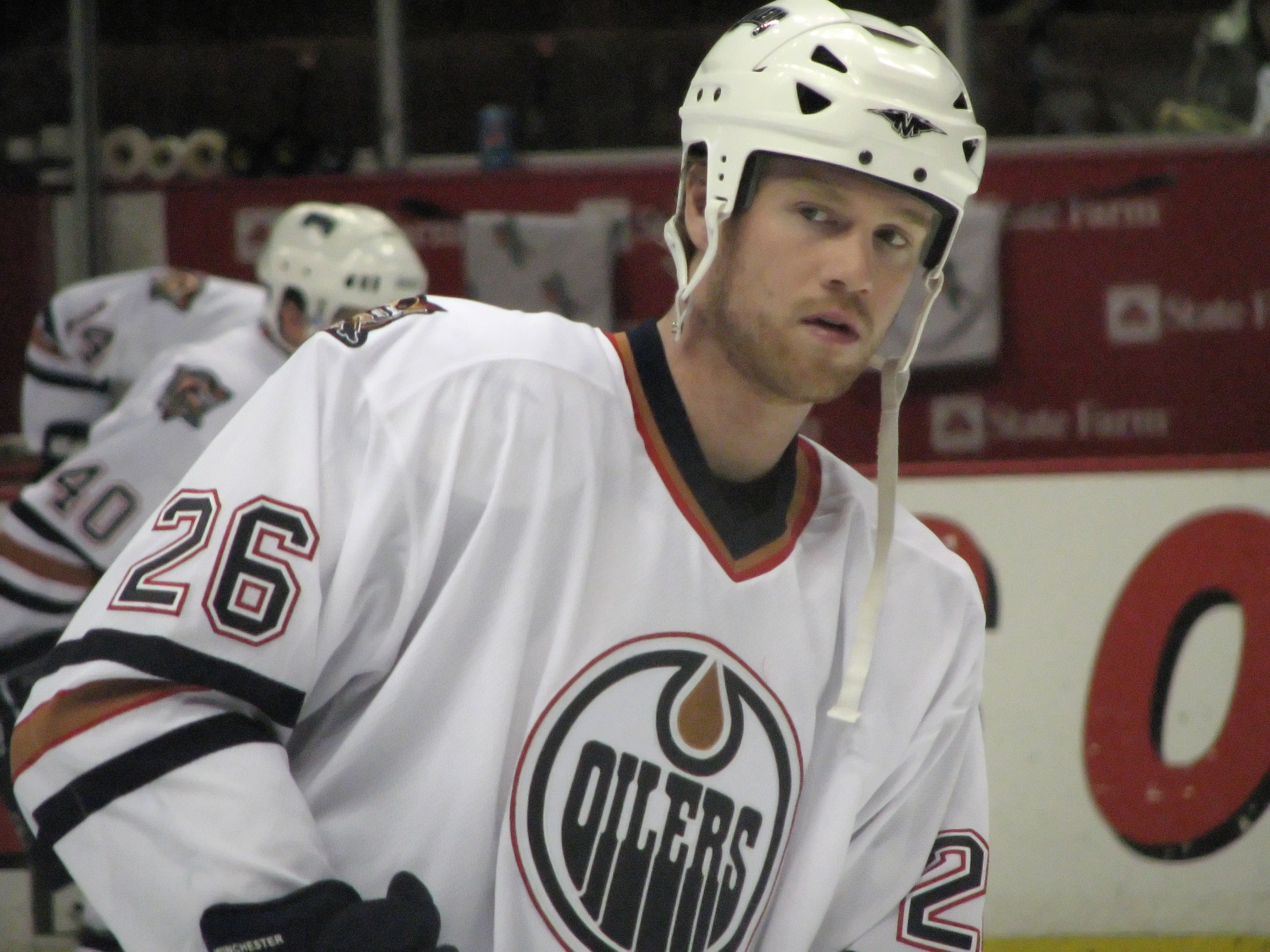
Brad Winchester

== See also ==
- Wisconsin Badgers women's ice hockey
- Wisconsin Badgers
- University of Wisconsin–Madison
