= Varsity (alma mater song) =

Alma mater of the University of Wisconsin-Madison

"Varsity" is the alma mater of the University of Wisconsin–Madison. The ending lyrics of the song are accompanied by the singers waving their caps held in their right hands.

== History ==
The "Varsity Toast" was composed in 1898 by Henry Dyke Sleeper, an instructor for the University’s School of Music. The work was adapted from the Latin hymn Domine Salvam Fac written by Charles Gounod. Over the years "Varsity Toast" has been shortened to "Varsity."

== History of the arm wave ==
The arm wave was inspired by the striking image of the University of Pennsylvania students waving their caps as they sang their alma mater after losing to the University of Illinois football team. The image stuck with Raymond F. Dvorak, then assistant band director for the University of Illinois. In 1934, Dvorak became the band director for the University of Wisconsin. That same year, following a speech by the University’s president, Glenn Frank, Dvorak instructed the students to watch for his cue to wave their hands as they sang the ending lyrics to "Varsity". The wave caught on and is now a tradition at the University of Wisconsin.

== Lyrics ==
U-rah-rah! Wisconsin! Sing!

Varsity! Varsity!

U-rah-rah! Wisconsin,

Praise to thee we sing!

Praise to thee, our Alma Mater,

U-rah-rah! Wisconsin!

== See also ==
- "On, Wisconsin"
