= On, Wisconsin! =

Official state song of Wisconsin

- 1909 sheet music cover

Song
- Written: 1909
- Published: 1909
- Genre: Fight song
- Composer: William T. Purdy
- Lyricist: Carl Beck

"On, Wisconsin!" is the fight song of the Wisconsin Badgers at the University of Wisconsin–Madison. A version with modified lyrics is the official state song of Wisconsin.

"On, Wisconsin!" was also the cry that Arthur MacArthur Jr. used in the Battle of Chattanooga at Missionary Ridge in the Civil War.

== History ==
The tune was composed in 1909 by William T. Purdy as "Minnesota, Minnesota," with the intention of entering it into a competition for a new fight song at the University of Minnesota.

Carl Beck, a former Wisconsin student, convinced him to withdraw it from the contest at the last minute and allow his alma mater to use it instead. Beck then wrote the original, football-oriented lyrics, changing the words "Minnesota, Minnesota" to "On, Wisconsin! On, Wisconsin!" (The eventual winner of the competition became known as the Minnesota Rouser.)

The lyrics were rewritten for the state song in 1913 by Judge Charles D. Rosa and J. S. Hubbard. The song was widely recognized as the state song at that time but was never officially designated. Finally, in 1959, "On, Wisconsin!" was codified in Chapter 170, Laws of 1959, and is incorporated in Section 1.10 of the statutes.

"On, Wisconsin!" was regarded by John Philip Sousa as "the finest of college marching songs". It has become one of the most popular fight songs in the country, with some 2,500 schools using some variation of it as their school song. There have been persistent rumors that the rights to the song are owned by Paul McCartney or Michael Jackson. The song is actually in the public domain in the United States. The international rights are unclear.

== Lyrics ==
On, Wisconsin! On, Wisconsin! Plunge right through that line!

Run the ball clear down the field, a touchdown sure this time.
On, Wisconsin! On, Wisconsin! Fight on for her fame,
Fight! Fellows! Fight! Fight, fight, we'll win this game.

On, Wisconsin! On, Wisconsin! Stand up, Badgers sing!
'Forward' is our driving spirit loyal voices ring.
On, Wisconsin! On, Wisconsin! Raise her glowing flame
Stand, fellows, let us now salute her name!

On, Wisconsin! On, Wisconsin! Grand all badger state!
We the loyal sons and daughters Hail for good and great!
On, Wisconsin! On, Wisconsin! Champion of the right!
Forward Our motto God will give thee right!

Modified lyrics for the state song:

On, Wisconsin! On, Wisconsin!

Grand old badger state!
We, thy loyal sons and daughters,
Hail thee, good and great.
On, Wisconsin! On, Wisconsin!
Champion of the right,
"Forward", our motto

God will give thee might!

== Battle cry ==
"On, Wisconsin!" was the cry that Arthur MacArthur Jr. used in the Battle of Chattanooga at Missionary Ridge during the American Civil War. He seized the regimental colors and rallied his regiment with "On, Wisconsin!", for which he was awarded the Medal of Honor.

== Ownership ==
In the early 1980s, after the purchase of Edwin H. Morris & Company, lawyers working for Paul McCartney attempted to claim copyrights for several well-known songs, including On, Wisconsin! The entire catalog was later sold to Michael Jackson. When the copyright claim was initially made, public outcry demanded that the copyright be deeded over to the State of Wisconsin as the copyright holders were demanding royalties for performance. The matter was resolved quietly; however, rumors persist that McCartney or Jackson's estate holds the claim. The song remains in the public domain.

== See also ==
- "Varsity" – the alma mater song of the University of Wisconsin–Madison
- "Be True to Your School"
