= Bill O'Neill (ice hockey) =

American college men's ice hockey coach

Biographical details
- Born: August 20, 1956 (age 70); Lynn, Massachusetts, USA
- Education: Boston University

Playing career
- 1975–1979: Boston University

Coaching career (HC unless noted)
- 1979–1981: Norwich (assistant)
- 1981–2023: Salem State

Head coaching record
- Overall: 626–436–76 (.583)
- Tournaments: 6–12–1 (.342)

Accomplishments and honors

Championships
- 1985 ECAC 2 East Division Champion; 1985 ECAC East Tournament champion 1994 ECAC East Champion; 1994 ECAC East tournament champion 1995 ECAC East tournament champion 2010 MASCAC Tournament champion 2014 MASCAC Champion; 2014 MASCAC tournament champion 2016 MASCAC Champion; 2016 MASCAC tournament champion 2017 MASCAC tournament champion

William O'Neill is an American retired college men's ice hockey coach. O'Neill was the head coach at Salem State University from 1981 until 2023, winning more than 600 games in that time.

== Career ==
O'Neill's college career began in 1975 with the Boston University Terriers. After playing in just one game as a freshman, he grew into his role as a depth defensemen and helped BU win the National Championship in 1978. After graduating, O'Neill attended a tryout for the Boston Bruins but, when nothing materialized, he signed on as a graduate assistant at Norwich University.

After two years with the Cadets, O'Neill was named as the head coach at Salem State. He saw a good deal of success in the early part of his tenure, leading the Vikings to five 20-win seasons in the span of ten years and made four consecutive appearances in the NCAA Tournament. After the mid-90's, the program declined slightly; though they routinely posted winning records, the team didn't make any NCAA appearance for almost 20 years. Even when Salem State won the inaugural MASCAC tournament championship, the league hadn't yet been given an automatic bid so O'Neill's championship team wasn't invited to participate.

Despite the lack of sustained success in recent years, O'Neill continues to lead the Vikings. Near the end of the 2019 season, O'Neill recorded his 600th victory, becoming just the fourth coach in NCAA history to achieve that feat with one team. When the program cancelled its 2020–21 season due to the COVID-19 pandemic, O'Neill was 12th all-time in wins with 606. At that time he was the longest-tenured coach at any NCAA program and had more wins than any active bench boss at the Division III level. Following the 2023 season, O'Neill retired after 42 at the helm.

== Head coaching record ==
Record table
Season	Team	Overall	Conference	Standing	Postseason
Salem State Vikings (ECAC 2) (1981–1985)
1981–82	Salem State	16–14–1	14–11–1	14th	ECAC 2 East Quarterfinals
1982–83	Salem State	17–10–3	14–8–3	8th	ECAC 2 East Semifinals
1983–84	Salem State	13–15–3	10–11–3	14th	ECAC 2 East Quarterfinals
1984–85	Salem State	24–9–0	18–6–0	4th	NCAA Quarterfinals
Salem State:		70–48–7	56–36–7		
Salem State Vikings (ECAC East) (1985–2009)
1985–86	Salem State	18–9–0	14–8–0	4th	ECAC East Quarterfinals
1986–87	Salem State	22–11–1	17–9–1	4th	NCAA Quarterfinals
1987–88	Salem State	22–14–0	18–9–0	T–5th	ECAC East Semifinals
1988–89	Salem State	15–12–0	11–9–0	6th	ECAC East Quarterfinals
1989–90	Salem State	15–11–1	11–10–1	7th	ECAC East Quarterfinals
1990–91	Salem State	21–6–1	15–5–1	T–2nd	ECAC East Semifinals
1991–92	Salem State	19–10–0	12–3–0	3rd	NCAA third-place game (win)
1992–93	Salem State	19–8–1	10–4–1	5th	NCAA Quarterfinals
1993–94	Salem State	23–6–3	12–3–2	T–1st	NCAA third-place game (loss)
1994–95	Salem State	18–6–1	12–5–0	5th	NCAA Quarterfinals
1995–96	Salem State	17–9–1	14–5–0	T–4th	ECAC East Semifinals
1996–97	Salem State	12–10–2	8–9–2	T–11th	
1997–98	Salem State	15–10–2	11–6–2	T–6th	ECAC East Semifinals
1998–99	Salem State	14–11–1	7–9–1	11th	ECAC East first round
1999–00	Salem State	15–9–3	8–7–2	2nd	ECAC East Runner-Up
2000–01	Salem State	16–6–4	10–5–2	2nd	ECAC East Semifinals
2001–02	Salem State	15–11–1	9–9–1	T–3rd	ECAC East Semifinals
2002–03	Salem State	15–9–3	9–7–3	4th	ECAC East Semifinals
2003–04	Salem State	12–11–3	7–9–2	4th	ECAC East Semifinals
2004–05	Salem State	11–12–3	6–9–3	5th	ECAC East Quarterfinals
2005–06	Salem State	11–11–4	7–8–4	5th	ECAC East Quarterfinals
2006–07	Salem State	9–17–0	5–14–0	7th	ECAC East Quarterfinals
2007–08	Salem State	16–11–1	9–9–1	T–5th	ECAC East Runner-Up
2008–09	Salem State	14–9–2	10–8–1	3rd	ECAC East Quarterfinals
Salem State:		384–239–38	252–179–30		
Salem State Vikings (MASCAC) (2009–2023)
2009–10	Salem State	15–8–4	11–3–4	2nd	MASCAC Champion
2010–11	Salem State	18–7–2	11–5–2	2nd	MASCAC Runner-Up
2011–12	Salem State	15–9–3	11–4–3	2nd	MASCAC Runner-Up
2012–13	Salem State	14–12–1	10–7–1	T–3rd	MASCAC Semifinals
2013–14	Salem State	16–10–2	11–5–2	T–1st	NCAA first round
2014–15	Salem State	13–11–3	9–7–2	2nd	MASCAC Runner-Up
2015–16	Salem State	22–6–0	16–2–0	1st	NCAA first round
2016–17	Salem State	15–10–3	12–4–2	2nd	NCAA first round
2017–18	Salem State	10–12–5	6–9–3	6th	MASCAC Semifinals
2018–19	Salem State	10–17–1	7–11–0	6th	MASCAC Runner-Up
2019–20	Salem State	4–15–7	4–9–5	5th	MASCAC Quarterfinals
2020–21	Salem State				Season cancelled
2021–22	Salem State	12–13–0	8–10–0	T–5th	MASCAC Quarterfinals
2022–23	Salem State	8–19–0	5–13–0	6th	MASCAC Semifinals
Salem State:		172–149–31	121–89–24		
Total:		626–436–76			
National champion Postseason invitational champion Conference regular season champion Conference regular season and conference tournament champion Division regular season champion Division regular season and conference tournament champion Conference tournament champion

== See also ==
- List of college men's ice hockey coaches with 400 wins
