= List of Northern Michigan Wildcats men's ice hockey seasons =

This is a list of seasons completed by the Northern Michigan University Wildcats men's ice hockey team.

Northern Michigan has won one NCAA Championship in its history (1991).

== Season-by-season results ==
NAIA/NCAA D-I Champions	NAIA/NCAA Frozen Four	Conference regular season champions	Conference Playoff Champions

Season	Conference	Regular Season (Note: Code explanation; GP—Games Played, W—Wins, L—Losses, T—Tied games, OTW—Overtime Wins, OTL—Overtime Loses, 3/SW—Win in 3 on 3 overtime or shootout, Pts—Points*)														Conference Tournament Results	National Tournament Results
Season	Conference	Conference									Overall					Conference Tournament Results	National Tournament Results
Season	Conference	GP	W	L	T	OTW	OTL	3/SW	Pts*	Finish	GP	W	L	T	%	Conference Tournament Results	National Tournament Results
Rick Comley (1976–2002)
1976–77	Independent	-	-	-	-	-	-	-	-	-	33	19	13	1	.591		
1977–78	CCHA	18	8	10	2	-	-	-	18	T–3rd	34	19	12	3	.603	Lost Semifinal series, 6–10 (Saint Louis)	
1978–79	CCHA	24	13	10	1	-	-	-	27	3rd	34	19	12	3	.603	Lost Semifinal series, 9–10 (Ohio State)	
1979–80	CCHA	20	17	3	0	-	-	-	34	1st	41	34	6	1	.841	Won Semifinal series, 14–6 (Bowling Green); Won Championship series, 15–9 (Ferris State)	Won First round, 4–3 (Minnesota); Won Semifinal, 5–4 (Cornell); Lost Championship, 2–5 (North Dakota)
1980–81	CCHA	22	18	4	0	-	-	-	36	1st	44	27	14	3	.648	Won Semifinal series, 13–5 (Bowling Green); Won Championship series, 6–4 (Ohio State)	Won Quarterfinal series, 10–7 (Cornell); Lost Semifinal, 1–5 (Wisconsin); Lost Third-place game, 2–5 (Michigan Tech)
1981–82	CCHA	28	12	16	0	-	-	-	24	T–7th	36	15	21	0	.417	Lost CCHA Quarterfinal series, 5–18 (Bowling Green)	
1982–83	CCHA	32	16	13	3	-	-	-	35	5th	40	18	18	4	.500	Won Quarterfinal series, 6–5 (Michigan Tech); Lost Semifinal, 0–3 (Bowling Green); Lost Consolation Game, 6–8 (Ohio State)	
1983–84	CCHA	30	16	14	0	-	-	-	.533	4th	40	17	22	1	.438	Lost Quarterfinal series, 6–7 (Western Michigan)	
1984–85	WCHA	34	14	20	0	-	-	-	28	7th	40	19	21	0	.475	Lost Quarterfinal series, 8–9 (Minnesota)	
1985–86	WCHA	34	21	13	0	-	-	-	42	5th	39	23	14	2	.615	Lost Quarterfinal series, 8–12 (Minnesota–Duluth)	
1986–87	WCHA	35	16	18	1	-	-	-	33	5th	40	18	21	1	.463	Lost Quarterfinal series, 4–10 (Wisconsin)	
1987–88	WCHA	35	14	17	4	-	-	-	32	T–6th	40	16	20	4	.450	Lost Quarterfinal series, 0–2 (Wisconsin)	
1988–89	WCHA	35	20	13	2	-	-	-	42	2nd	45	26	17	2	.600	Won Quarterfinal series, 2–0 (Minnesota–Duluth); Won Semifinal, 4–2 (Wisconsin); Won Championship, 9–4 (Denver)	Lost First round series, 1–2 (Providence)
1989–90	WCHA	28	15	12	1	-	-	-	31	4th	42	22	19	1	.536	Won Quarterfinal series, 2–0 (Denver); Lost Semifinal, 3–4 (OT) (Wisconsin); Lost Third-place game, 5–6 (OT) (North Dakota)	
1990–91	WCHA	32	25	3	4	-	-	-	54	1st	47	38	5	4	.851	Won Quarterfinal series, 2–0 (Colorado College); Won Semifinal, 8–4 (North Dakota); Won Championship, 4–2 (Minnesota)	Won Quarterfinal series, 2–0 (Alaska–Anchorage); Won Semifinal, 5–3 (Maine); Won Championship, 8–7 (3OT) (Boston University)
1991–92	WCHA	32	17	12	3	-	-	-	37	3rd	42	25	14	3	.631	Won Quarterfinal series, 2–0 (Michigan Tech); Won Semifinal, 6–3 (Wisconsin); Won Championship, 4–2 (Minnesota)	Won Regional Quarterfinal, 8–4 (Clarkson); Lost regional semifinal, 6–7 (Michigan)
1992–93	WCHA	32	15	13	5	-	-	-	34	5th	43	21	18	4	.535	Won First round series, 2–0 (Denver); Won Quarterfinal, 4–3 (Michigan Tech); Won Semifinal, 6–2 (Minnesota–Duluth); Lost Championship, 3–5 (Minnesota)	Won Regional semifinal, 3–2 (2OT) (Harvard); Lost regional semifinal, 1–4 (Boston University)
1993–94	WCHA	32	17	14	1	-	-	-	35	5th	39	22	16	1	.577	Won First round series, 2–0 (Alaska–Anchorage); Lost Quarterfinal, 1–5 (Michigan Tech)	
1994–95	WCHA	32	10	19	3	-	-	-	23	9th	40	13	24	3	.363	Lost First round series, 1–2 (Wisconsin)	
1995–96	WCHA	32	5	25	2	-	-	-	12	10th	39	7	30	2	.205	Lost First round series, 0–2 (Colorado College)	
1996–97	WCHA	32	9	21	2	-	-	-	20	8th	40	13	24	3	.363	Lost Quarterfinal series, 0–2 (St. Cloud State)	
1997–98	CCHA	30	15	12	3	-	-	-	33	4th	38	19	15	4	.553	Won Quarterfinal series, 2–0 (Miami); Lost Semifinal, 1–5 (Michigan State)	
1998–99	CCHA	30	14	11	5	-	-	-	33	5th	42	22	15	5	.583	Won Quarterfinal series, 2–1 (Notre Dame); Won Semifinal, 5–3 (Michigan State); Lost Championship, 1–5 (Michigan)	Lost Regional Quarterfinal, 1–2 (Boston College)
1999–00	CCHA	28	16	8	4	-	-	-	36	T–3rd	39	22	13	4	.615	Lost Quarterfinal series, 1–2 (Nebraska–Omaha)	
2000–01	CCHA	28	12	10	6	-	-	-	30	T–5th	38	18	13	7	.566	Won Quarterfinal series, 2–1 (Western Michigan); Lost Play-In, 1–2 (OT) (Bowling Green)	
2001–02	CCHA	28	16	10	2	-	-	-	34	3rd	40	26	12	2	.675	Won First round series, 2–0 (Miami); Won Quarterfinal, 3–1 (Notre Dame); Lost Semifinal, 1–2 (Michigan State)	
Walt Kyle (2002–2017)
2002–03	CCHA	28	14	13	1	-	-	-	29	T–5th	41	22	17	2	.561	Won First round series, 2–0 (Western Michigan); Won Quarterfinal, 7–5 (Michigan State); Lost Semifinal, 2–4 (Ferris State); Won Third-place game, 4–1 (Ohio State)	
2003–04	CCHA	28	13	13	2	-	-	-	28	7th	41	21	16	4	.561	Won First round series, 2–0 (Alaska–Fairbanks); Won Quarterfinal, 2–1 (Michigan State); Lost Semifinal, 1–5 (Michigan); Lost Third-place game, 0–4 (Miami)	
2004–05	CCHA	28	17	7	4	-	-	-	38	3rd	40	22	11	7	.638	Won First round series, 2–1 (Western Michigan); Lost Quarterfinal, 3–6 (Alaska–Fairbanks)	
2005–06	CCHA	28	14	12	2	-	-	-	30	T–4th	40	22	16	2	.575	Won Quarterfinal series, 2–0 (Nebraska–Omaha); Lost Semifinal, 2–5 (Miami); Lost Third-place game, 2–3 (Michigan)	
2006–07	CCHA	28	10	17	1	-	-	-	21	10th	41	15	24	2	.390	Won First round series, 2–1 (Ohio State); Lost Quarterfinal series, 0–2 (Michigan)	
2007–08	CCHA	28	12	13	3	-	-	-	27	6th	44	20	20	4	.500	Won First round series, 2–0 (Ohio State); Won Quarterfinal series, 2–1 (Michigan State); Lost Semifinal, 4–6 (Michigan); Won Third-place game, 2–1 (Notre Dame)	
2008–09	CCHA	28	11	12	5	-	-	3	30	6th	41	19	17	5	.524	Won First round series, 2–0 (Michigan State); Won Quarterfinal series, 2–1 (Miami); Lost Semifinal, 1–2 (Notre Dame); Won Third-place game, 2–1 (Alaska)	
2009–10	CCHA	28	13	9	6	-	-	3	48	4th	41	20	13	8	.585	Won First round series, 2–0 (Bowling Green); Won Quarterfinal series, 2–0 (Alaska); Won Semifinal, 5–4 (OT) (Ferris State); Lost Championship, 1–2 (Michigan)	Lost Regional Quarterfinal, 3–4 (2OT) (St. Cloud State)
2010–11	CCHA	28	12	13	3	-	-	0	39	6th	39	15	19	5	.449	Lost First round series, 1–2 (Bowling Green)	
2011–12	CCHA	28	11	11	6	-	-	3	42	6th	37	17	14	6	.541	Lost First round series, 1–2 (Bowling Green)	
2012–13	CCHA	28	9	15	4	-	-	1	32	10th	38	15	19	4	.447	Lost First round series, 0–2 (Michigan)	
2013–14	WCHA	28	13	14	1	-	-	–	27	7th	38	15	21	2	.421	Lost First round series, 0–2 (Minnesota State)	
2014–15	WCHA	28	11	13	4	-	-	–	26	7th	38	14	18	6	.447	Lost First round series, 0–2 (Bowling Green)	
2015–16	WCHA	28	12	11	5	-	-	–	29	5th	38	15	16	7	.487	Lost First round series, 0–2 (Ferris State)	
2016–17	WCHA	28	10	15	3	-	-	1	34	8th	39	13	22	4	.385	Lost First round series, 1–2 (Bemidji State)	
Grant Potulny (2017–2024)
2017–18	WCHA	28	19	7	2	-	-	2	61	2nd	43	25	15	3	.616	Won Quarterfinal series, 2–1 (Alabama–Huntsville); Won Semifinal series, 2–1 (Bowling Green); Lost Championship, 0–2 (Michigan Tech)	
2018–19	WCHA	28	18	8	2	-	-	0	56	2nd	39	21	16	2	.564	Won First round series, 2–0 (Alaska); Lost Semifinal series, 0–2 (Bowling Green)	
2019–20	WCHA	28	16	11	1	-	-	1	50	3rd	38	18	16	4	.526	Lost Quarterfinal series, 0–2 (Michigan Tech)	
2020–21	WCHA	14	6	7	1	2	2	1	20	T–5th	29	11	17	1	.397	Won Quarterfinal series, 2–1 (Bowling Green); Won Semifinal, 5–1 (Minnesota State); Lost Championship, 3–6 (Lake Superior State)	
2021–22	CCHA	26	12	13	1	3	0	1	35	5th	37	20	16	1	.554	Won Quarterfinal series, 2–1 (Lake Superior State); Lost Semifinal, 1–8 (Minnesota State)	
2022–23	CCHA	26	14	12	0	3	0	0	39	T–4th	38	21	17	0	.553	Won Quarterfinal series, 2–0 (Bemidji State); Won Semifinal, 4–0 (Michigan Tech); Lost Championship, 2–3 (OT) (Minnesota State)	
2023–24	CCHA	24	10	10	4	1	1	2	36	5th	34	12	16	6	.441	Lost Quarterfinal series, 0–2 (Minnesota State)	
Dave Shyiak (2024–Present)
2024–25	CCHA	26	4	20	2	1	1	2	.205	9th	34	5	27	2	.176		
2025–26	CCHA	26	3	21	2	0	2	0	13	9th	34	3	29	2	.118		
Totals											GP	W	L	T	%	Championships	
Regular Season											1772	845	778	149	.519	2 CCHA Championships, 1 WCHA Championship	
Conference Post-season											165	84	73	8	.533	2 CCHA tournament championships, 3 WCHA tournament championships	
NCAA Post-season											20	10	10	0	.500	8 NCAA Tournament appearances	
Regular Season and Post-season Record											1957	939	861	157	.520	1 NCAA Division I National Championship	

* Winning percentage is used when conference schedules are unbalanced.
