= 1977–78 Boston University Terriers men's ice hockey season =

National champion Beanpot, champion ECAC Hockey, champion NCAA tournament, champion
- Conference: 1st ECAC Hockey
- Home ice: Walter Brown Arena

Record
- Overall: 30–2–0
- Conference: 21–1–0
- Home: 10–0
- Road: 15–1
- Neutral: 5–1

Coaches and captains
- Head coach: Jack Parker
- Assistant coaches: Andy Fila; Bob Murray; Don Cahoon
- Captain(s): Brian Durocher; Jack O'Callahan

The 1977–78 Boston University Terriers men's ice hockey team represented Boston University in college ice hockey. In its 5th year under head coach Jack Parker the team compiled a 30–2–0 record and reached the NCAA tournament for the fifth consecutive season and thirteenth all-time. The Terriers defeated Boston College 5–3 in the championship game at the Providence Civic Center in Providence, Rhode Island to win their third national championship.

This was the first championship team to play more games on the road than at home.

== Season ==
=== Winning ===
After four consecutive ECAC tournament championships, and nothing to show for it at the national level, Boston University came out of the gate swinging. Backstopped by the tandem of Jim Craig and team co-captain Brian Durocher, BU walloped Merrimack in the season opener before starting their conference schedule. The first four ECAC matches were all close affairs, with only one having more than a one-goal margin, but the Terriers managed to win each game.

Boston University did not participate in a holiday tournament during the season, opting instead to play three non-conference games against Air Force and Michigan State where they, again, won each match. After a 6–5 win over rival Cornell the Terriers began an arduous road schedule; in a ten-game span over 4 weeks the Terriers would play eight games on the road. BU struggled most nights to dominate what would normally be inferior competition but the Terriers continued to win night in and night out. By the time the Beanpot rolled around in early February BU remained unbeaten and possessed a sparkling 19–0 record. Their 15–0 conference record all but guaranteed the Terriers first place in the ECAC tournament and when they throttled arch-rival Boston College 12–5 in the Beanpot semis the Terriers looked on track to join 1969–70 Cornell win an undefeated season.

=== First Loss ===
Two days after a second victory over the Eagles, BU headed to New Haven, Connecticut where they were finally burned by playing all those close games. Yale managed to score 7 goals on BU, the third time that the Terriers had allowed that many goals, but Boston University only netted 5 and suffered their first loss of the season, ending a 21-game winning streak. After two more close wins BU punished Harvard 7–1 in the Beanpot championship and won their 10th title. The Terriers ended the regular season three days later with yet another one-goal victory to finish with the best record in program history at 25–1.

=== ECAC tournament ===
BU served as the host for their quarterfinal meeting with New Hampshire and despite the Wildcat's 8th-seed UNH possessed a better offence than Boston University. New Hampshire demonstrated their scoring prowess throughout the game but the Terriers were just a little bit better on the night and managed to pull out a 6–5 win in overtime. Their semifinal meeting against Providence, however, could not have gone worse. Needing just one more win to guarantee a spot in the NCAA tournament, BU's offense faltered and scored once, only the second time all season where they had failed to record at least 4 goals. Providence meanwhile pumped five pucks into the Terriers' net and skated to a relatively easy victory.

The loss dealt a serious blow to BU's title hopes but it did not end them entirely. Boston University's first champion in 1971 came as a result of being chosen over conference runner-up Clarkson and in the meantime the NCAA selection committee had given itself the ability to add up to four additional teams to the tournament if they so desired. However, before any of that would occur, BU would have to take care of business in the third-place game against Brown. BU's 8–4 win pushed its record to 27–2 and with their 21-game streak to start the season the selection committee did award Boston University with an at-large bid, the only time in the 4-year history of the then-format where the committee invited an additional team.

=== NCAA tournament ===
Not wanting to waste the opportunity given to them, Boston University defense showed up to play in the tournament. In their First Round meeting, a rematch with Providence, BU found itself on the road in front of a very hostile crowd. While the Friars were hoping to even the season series the Terriers ended Providence's tournament with a 5–3 victory. The championship rounds of the tournament were being held down the road at the Providence Civic Center so BU had a very short distance to travel. Waiting for them was WCHA co-champion and defending national champion Wisconsin. Despite possessing the top two scorers in the nation, Wisconsin was unable to bring their offense to bear and BU finally made it to a championship game after four years of futility.

In the title tilt BU faced off against BC who had lost the previous three meetings by a combined score of 28–13. The Eagles gave themselves no favors when Joe Augustine took a penalty just 9 seconds into the game, allowing BU's leading scorer Mark Fidler to open the scoring with a power play goal 38 seconds in. Boston College responded with two goals in the middle of the period but BU regained the lead with two of their own before the first 20 minutes had ended. In the most penalty-filled contest in NCAA history (22 minor penalties in total) Tony Meagher scored a short-handed goal to give BU a 3–2 lead and then got his second score ten minutes later to build the first two-goal cushion of the night. Fidler notched his own second goal one minute into the third and Jim Craig turned aside 22 of BC's 23 shots in the final 40 minutes to give Boston University its third national championship.

=== Awards and honors ===
Future olympian Jack O'Callahan was named as the Tournament MOP and joined on the All-Tournament Team by teammates Dave Silk, Dick Lamby and Mark Fidler. No Terrier was named to the AHCA All-American East Team despite their stellar record but head coach Jack Parker received his second Spencer Penrose Award as the national coach of the year. Mark Fidler received the ECAC Rookie of the Year Award. O'Callahan was named to the All-ECAC Hockey First Team, while Lamby and Silk made the Second Team.

Five players were selected in the 1978 NHL Amateur Draft with only Dave Silk managing to reach the NHL. Three players, however, later achieved hockey immortality as members of the goal medal-winning team at the 1980 Winter Olympics (Jack O'Callahan, Dave Silk and Jim Craig).

== Standings ==
1977–78 ECAC Hockey standings
	Conference							Overall					
	GP	W	L	T	Pct.	GF	GA	GP	W	L	T	GF	GA
Boston University†	22	21	1	0	.955	135	85	32	30	2	0	199	126
Cornell	22	16	5	1	.750	161	79	27	20	6	1	195	100
Clarkson	23	16	7	0	.696	139	109	30	19	11	0	174	145
Rensselaer	21	13	8	0	.619	100	83	29	19	9	1	162	117
Boston College*	23	14	9	0	.609	117	116	34	24	10	0	186	147
Brown	23	13	9	1	.587	101	78	29	14	14	1	117	102
Providence	23	12	9	2	.565	116	95	34	17	15	2	172	146
New Hampshire	25	14	11	0	.560	154	124	30	18	12	0	197	150
Yale	26	12	13	1	.481	92	114	26	12	13	1	92	114
Harvard	23	10	13	0	.435	87	112	26	12	14	0	99	122
Dartmouth	23	9	14	0	.391	97	114	26	11	15	0	107	129
Vermont	23	9	14	0	.391	94	108	31	15	16	0	139	137
St. Lawrence	22	8	14	0	.364	91	124	30	12	18	0	124	152
Princeton	21	7	13	1	.357	83	89	25	9	14	2	102	102
Northeastern	24	7	16	1	.313	131	128	28	10	17	1	155	142
Pennsylvania	21	5	14	2	.286	82	123	26	7	17	2	98	145
Colgate	25	4	20	1	.180	81	180	28	5	22	1	91	187
Championship: Boston College † indicates conference regular season champion * indicates conference tournament champion

== Schedule ==
Date	Opponent^{#}	Rank^{#}	Site	Result	Record
Regular season
November 22	vs. Merrimack*		Walter Brown Arena • Boston, Massachusetts	W 13–5	1–0
November 27	vs. Providence		Walter Brown Arena • Boston, Massachusetts	W 4–2	2–0 (1–0)
November 30	at Dartmouth		Thompson Arena • Hanover, New Hampshire	W 3–2	3–0 (2–0)
December 3	vs. New Hampshire		Walter Brown Arena • Boston, Massachusetts	W 6–5	4–0 (3–0)
December 7	vs. Harvard		Walter Brown Arena • Boston, Massachusetts	W 4–3	5–0 (4–0)
December 27	vs. Air Force*		Walter Brown Arena • Boston, Massachusetts	W 8–7	6–0 (4–0)
December 29	at Michigan State*		Munn Ice Arena • East Lansing, Michigan	W 7–5	7–0 (4–0)
December 30	at Michigan State*		Munn Ice Arena • East Lansing, Michigan	W 6–3	8–0 (4–0)
January 4	vs. Cornell		Walter Brown Arena • Boston, Massachusetts	W 6–5	9–0 (5–0)
January 7	at Princeton		Hobey Baker Memorial Rink • Princeton, New Jersey	W 4–3	10–0 (6–0)
January 11	at New Hampshire		Snively Arena • Durham, New Hampshire	W 6–4	11–0 (7–0)
January 13	at St. Lawrence		Appleton Arena • Canton, New York	W 8–3	12–0 (8–0)
January 14	at Clarkson		Walker Arena • Potsdam, New York	W 7–4	13–0 (9–0)
January 17	vs. Northeastern		Walter Brown Arena • Boston, Massachusetts	W 6–4	14–0 (10–0)
January 21	vs. Boston College		Walter Brown Arena • Boston, Massachusetts	W 6–3	15–0 (11–0)
January 24	at Rensselaer		Houston Field House • Troy, New York	W 8–7	16–0 (12–0)
January 28	at Vermont		Gutterson Fieldhouse • Burlington, Vermont	W 6–4	17–0 (13–0)
February 1	at Brown		Meehan Auditorium • Providence, Rhode Island	W 4–2	18–0 (14–0)
February 4	at Providence		Schneider Arena • Providence, Rhode Island	W 4–2	19–0 (15–0)
Beanpot
February 6	vs. Boston College		Boston Garden • Boston, Massachusetts (Beanpot Semifinal)	W 12–5	20–0 (16–0)
February 16	at Boston College		McHugh Forum • Chestnut Hill, Massachusetts	W 10–5	21–0 (17–0)
February 18	at Yale		Ingalls Rink • New Haven, Connecticut	L 5–7	21–1 (17–1)
February 22	at Northeastern		Matthews Arena • Boston, Massachusetts	W 6–4	22–1 (18–1)
February 25	vs. Colgate		Starr Arena • Hamilton, New York	W 6–5 ^{OT}	23–1 (19–1)
March 1	vs. Harvard		Boston Garden • Boston, Massachusetts (Beanpot championship)	W 7–1	24–1 (20–1)
March 4	vs. Vermont		Walter Brown Arena • Boston, Massachusetts	W 6–5	25–1 (21–1)
ECAC Hockey tournament
March 7	vs. New Hampshire*		Walter Brown Arena • Boston, Massachusetts (ECAC Quarterfinal)	W 6–5 ^{OT}	26–1 (21–1)
March 10	vs. Providence*		Boston Garden • Boston, Massachusetts (ECAC Semifinal)	L 1–5	26–2 (21–1)
March 11	vs. Brown*		Boston Garden • Boston, Massachusetts (ECAC Third Place Game)	W 8–4	27–2 (21–1)
NCAA tournament
March 19	vs. Providence*		Schneider Arena • Providence, Rhode Island (National First Round)	W 5–3	28–2 (21–1)
March 23	vs. Wisconsin*		Providence Civic Center • Providence, Rhode Island (National Semifinal)	W 5–2	29–2 (21–1)
March 25	vs. Boston College*		Providence Civic Center • Providence, Rhode Island (National championship)	W 5–3	30–2 (21–1)
*Non-conference game. ^{#}Rankings from USCHO.com Poll. Source:

== Roster and scoring statistics ==
No.	Name	Year	Position	Hometown	S/P/C	Games	Goals	Assists	Pts	PIM
12	Mark Fidler	Freshman	C	Charlestown, MA	(Massachusetts)	31	30	35	65	34
9	John Bethel	Junior	F	Roxboro, PQ	(Quebec)	30	25	38	63	53
23	Dick Lamby	Senior	D	Auburn, MA	(Massachusetts)	30	15	44	59	64
10	Dave Silk	Sophomore	W	Marshfield, MA	(Massachusetts)	28	27	31	58	57
17	Jack O'Callahan	Junior	D	Charlestown, MA	(Massachusetts)	31	8	47	55	61
18	Tony Meagher	Sophomore	F	Belleville, ON	(Ontario)	32	17	21	38	26
4	Mark Hetnik	Junior	C	Brookline, MA	(Massachusetts)	31	12	25	37	33
11	Bob Boileau	Junior	W	Pointe-Claire, PQ	(Quebec)	25	9	18	27	20
8	Paul Miller	Freshman	C	Billerica, MA	(Massachusetts)	31	10	14	24	28
15	Bill LeBlond	Sophomore	D	New Canaan, CT	(Connecticut)	32	8	15	23	16
20	Matt Marden	Senior	W	Malden, MA	(Massachusetts)	28	10	11	21	22
27	Bill O'Neill	Junior	D	Danvers, MA	(Massachusetts)	32	3	15	18	22
16	Mickey Mullen	Junior	W	Courtright, ON	(Ontario)	18	9	5	14	0
19	Daryl MacLeod	Freshman	W	Melrose, MA	(Massachusetts)	31	3	9	12	33
3	Bill Cotter	Freshman	W	Charlestown, MA	(Massachusetts)	32	2	8	10	16
21	John Melanson	Junior	F	Wakefield, MA	(Massachusetts)	30	7	0	7	10
24	Todd Johnson	Freshman	C	Wayland, MA	(Massachusetts)	29	2	2	4	2
7	John Fox	Junior	W	Willowdale, ON	(Ontario)	15	1	3	4	6
14	John Corriveau	Junior	W	Manchester, NH	(New Hampshire)	6	1	2	3	4
5	Tim Kimball	Freshman	D	Beverly, MA	(Massachusetts)	11	0	3	3	0
6	Scott Nieland	Sophomore	D	Minneapolis, MN	(Minnesota)	22	0	3	3	10
2	Brian O'Connor	Freshman	W	Winchester, MA	(Massachusetts)	0	-	-	-	-
35	Bob Wels	Junior	G	Buffalo, New York	(New York (state))	1	-	-	-	-
1	Brian Durocher	Senior	G	Longmeadow, MA	(Massachusetts)	16	-	-	-	-
30	Jim Craig	Junior	G	Boston, MA	(Massachusetts)	16	-	-	-	-
Total										

== Goaltending statistics ==
No.	Name	Games	Minutes	Wins	Losses	Ties	Goals against	Saves	Shut outs	SV %	GAA
30	Jim Craig	16	967	16	0	0	60		0		3.57
35	Bob Wels	1							0	.667	12.00
1	Brian Durocher	16		14	2	0			0		
Total		32		30	2	0	126		0		

== 1978 championship game ==
=== (E1) Boston College vs. (A2) Boston University ===
March 25	Boston College	3–5	Boston University	Providence Civic Center

Scoring summary
Period	Team	Goal	Assist(s)	Time	Score
1st	BU	Mark Fidler – PP	Lamby and O'Callahan	0:38	1–0 BU
1st	BC	Joe Mullen	Augustine	11:00	1–1
1st	BC	Bobby Hehir	unassisted	13:26	2–1 BC
1st	BU	Dave Silk – PP	O'Callahan	14:44	2–2
1st	BU	Tony Meagher – SH	Lamby	17:24	3–2 BU
2nd	BU	Tony Meagher – GW	Boileau and Hetnik	27:05	4–2 BU
3rd	BU	Mark Fidler	Silk and Lamby	41:01	5–2 BU
3rd	BC	Steve Barger	Switaj and Kennedy	43:30	5–3 BU
Penalty summary
Period	Team	Player	Penalty	Time	PIM
1st	BC	Joe Augustine	Holding	0:09	2:00
1st	BU	Dick Lamby	Hooking	2:39	2:00
1st	BU	Jack O'Callahan	High Sticking	5:51	2:00
1st	BU	Bill LeBlond	High Sticking	9:23	2:00
1st	BC	Mike Ewanouski	Tripping	14:26	2:00
1st	BU	Bill O'Neill	Slashing	15:47	2:00
1st	BU	Bill O'Neill	High Sticking	18:07	2:00
1st	BC	Charlie Antetomaso	Tripping	18:43	2:00
2nd	BC	George Amidon	Tripping	24:28	2:00
2nd	BC	Charlie Antetomaso	Tripping	28:06	2:00
2nd	BU	Dick Lamby	High Sticking	28:29	2:00
2nd	BU	Bill LeBlond	Holding	32:56	2:00
2nd	BC	Joe Augustine	Interference	33:53	2:00
2nd	BU	Mark Fidler	Slashing	36:47	2:00
2nd	BC	Paul Hammer	Cross–Checking	37:33	2:00
2nd	BC	Charlie Antetomaso	Tripping	38:20	2:00
3rd	BU	John Bethel	High Sticking	48:53	2:00
3rd	BU	John Bethel	Roughing	48:53	2:00
3rd	BC	Joe Casey	High Sticking	48:53	2:00
3rd	BC	Joe Casey	Roughing	48:53	2:00
3rd	BU	Dick Lamby	Holding	50:03	2:00
3rd	BC	Paul Barrett	High-Sticking	55:18	2:00

Shots by period
Team	1	2	3	T
Boston University	13	14	9	36
Boston College	8	9	14	31

Goaltenders
Team	Name	Saves	Goals against	Time on ice
BU	Jim Craig	28	3	
BC	Paul Skidmore	31	5	

== Players drafted into the NHL ==
=== 1978 NHL Amateur Draft ===
= Did not play in the NHL

Round	Pick	Player	NHL team
4	59	Dave Silk	New York Rangers
5	85	Daryl MacLeod	Boston Bruins
9	140	Tony Meagher	St. Louis Blues
13	209	Brian O'Connor	St. Louis Blues
14	217	Todd Johnson	New York Rangers
