= 1978 NCAA Division I men's ice hockey tournament =

- Teams: 6
- Finals site: Providence Civic Center, Providence, Rhode Island
- Champions: Boston University Terriers (3rd title)
- Runner-up: Boston College Eagles (3rd title game)
- Semifinalists: Bowling Green Falcons (1st Frozen Four); Wisconsin Badgers (5th Frozen Four)
- Winning coach: Jack Parker (1st title)
- MOP: Jack O'Callahan (Boston University)
- Attendance: 32,573

The 1978 NCAA Division I men's ice hockey tournament was the culmination of the 1977–78 NCAA Division I men's ice hockey season, the 31st such tournament in NCAA history. It was held between March 18 and 25, 1978, and concluded with Boston University defeating Boston College 5–3. The first-round games were held at the home team venue while all succeeding games were played at the Providence Civic Center in Providence, Rhode Island.

== Qualifying teams ==
The NCAA gave four teams automatic bids into the tournament. The two ECAC teams that reached the ECAC tournament final received bids as did the two WCHA co-champions. The NCAA also had the ability to add up to 4 additional teams as it saw fit and chose to include the CCHA tournament champion as well as Boston University who had lost only two games prior to the tournament (the second being in the ECAC semifinal). This was the only time in the four years this format was used that an additional team was added to the tournament. Because Colorado College entered the tournament with a losing record Bowling Green was given the honor of hosting the western first-round game.

East							West						
Seed	School	Conference	Record	Berth type	Appearance	Last bid	Seed	School	Conference	Record	Berth type	Appearance	Last bid
1	Boston College	ECAC Hockey	23–9–0	Tournament champion	11th	1973	1	Wisconsin	WCHA	28–10–3	Tournament co-champion	5th	1977
2	Providence	ECAC Hockey	17–14–2	Tournament finalist	2nd	1964	2	Colorado College	WCHA	18–21–1	Tournament co-champion	8th	1957
East At-Large							West At-Large						
Seed	School	Conference	Record	Berth type	Appearance	Last bid	Seed	School	Conference	Record	Berth type	Appearance	Last bid
A2	Boston University	ECAC Hockey	27–2–0	At-Large	13th	1977	A1	Bowling Green	CCHA	29–7–0	Tournament champion	2nd	1977

== Format ==
The four automatic qualifiers were seeded according to pre-tournament finish. The ECAC champion was seeded as the top eastern team while the WCHA co-champion that finished highest in the regular season was given the top western seed. The second eastern seed was slotted to play the top western seed and vice versa. Because an at-large bid was offered to a western school they were placed in a first-round game with the second western seed to determine the final semifinalist. The first-round game was played at the home venue of the second seed while all succeeding games were played at the Providence Civic Center. All matches were Single-game eliminations with the semifinal winners advancing to the national championship game and the losers playing in a consolation game.

== Bracket ==
First Round; March 18–19
W2	Colorado College	3
A1	Bowling Green	5
E2	Providence	3
A2	Boston University	5

Semifinals; March 23–24
E1	Boston College	6
A1	Bowling Green	2
W1	Wisconsin	2
A2	Boston University	5

National Championship; March 25
E1	Boston College	3
A2	Boston University	5
Third Place Game
W1	Wisconsin	3
A1	Bowling Green	4

Note: * denotes overtime period(s)

== Results ==
=== First Round ===
March 18, 1978; 7:30 pm	(A1) Bowling Green	5–3 (1–0, 2–2, 2–1)	(W2) Colorado College	BGSU Ice Arena; Attendance: 3,553

Game reference

Brian Stankiewicz
Goalies
Paul Mitchell

(Wells) John Mavity – 07:06	1 – 0
(Morrow) Mike Hartman – 23:34	2 – 0
	2 – 1	30:56 – Larry Soltvedt (Whyte, Magee)
(Easton, Newton) Paul Titanic – 35:44	3 – 1
	3 – 2	36:53 – Jim Kronschnabel (Seguin, Maksymyk)
(Wells, Markell) Paul Titanic – GW – 44:22	4 – 2
	4 – 3	49:18 – PP – Jim Warner (Whyte, Feamster)
(Easton, Markell) Byron Shutt – 59:39	5 – 3

16 min
Penalties
12 min
47
Shots
33

March 19, 1978; 7:30 pm	(E2) Providence	3–5 (1–1, 2–3, 0–1)	(A2) Boston University	Schneider Arena; Attendance: 3,000

Game reference

Bill Milner
Goalies
Jim Craig

	0 – 1	06:35 – Dick Lamby (Fidler)
(Korn, O'Neill) Art Johnston – 16:44	1 – 1
	1 – 2	22:02 – Dave Silk (Bethel)
	1 – 3	24:28 – Dick Lamby (Miller)
	1 – 4	34:03 – GW PP - Mark Fidler (O'Callahan, Lamby)
(Byers, O'Neill) Jeff Whistler – 35:50	2 – 4
(Whistler, Dornseif) John Sullivan – 37:42	3 – 4
	3 – 5	58:40 – John Bethel (Silk)

21
Shots
31

=== Semifinals ===
March 23, 1978; 7:30 pm	(W1) Wisconsin	2–5 (1–1, 1–2, 0–2)	(A2) Boston University	Providence Civic Center; Attendance: 8,136

Game reference

Julian Baretta
Goalies
Jim Craig

(Welsh, McIntosh) Mark Johnson – PP – 08:42	1 – 0
	1 – 1	11:29 – Dave Silk (Bethel, O'Callahan)
	1 – 2	27:31 – John Bethel (Silk, O'Callahan)
	1 – 3	28:47 – PP GW – Tony Meagher (Hetnick, O'Callahan)
(Eaves) Les Grauer – 32:37	2 – 3
	2 – 4	46:10 – PP – Mark Fidler (Silk)
	2 – 5	46:46 – Dave Silk (O'Callahan, Bethel)

26 min
Penalties
20 min
24
Shots
28

March 24, 1978; 7:30 pm	(E1) Boston College	6–2 (2–0, 3–0, 1–2)	(A1) Bowling Green	Providence Civic Center; Attendance: 8,200

Game reference

(out unknown, 29 saves) Paul Skidmore
(in unknown, 0 saves) Mike Cronin
Goalies
Brian Stankiewicz (out 30:27)
Wally Charko (in 30:27)
Referees:
Bill Quinn
John Ricci

(Hammer, Army) Joe Mullen – 00:28	1 – 0
(Casey, Riley) Walt Kyle – 13:16	2 – 0
(Ewanouski, Augustine) Paul Barrett – GW PP – 25:28	3 – 0
(Kennedy, Barger) Mark Switaj – 25:43	4 – 0
(Ewanouski) Bill Army – PP – 30:27	5 – 0
	5 – 1	40:16 – Mike Cotter (T. Newton, Shutt)
	5 – 2	51:28 – PP – Paul Titanic (Wells, Thomas)
(Mullen) Walt Kyle – PP – 56:23	6 – 2

14 min
Penalties
18 min
35
Shots
31

=== Third Place Game ===
March 25, 1978; 2:00 pm	(W1) Wisconsin	3–4 (1–2, 1–1, 1–1)	(A1) Bowling Green	Providence Civic Center; Attendance: 5,199

Game reference

David McNab
Goalies
Brian Stankiewicz
Referees:
Bill Quinn
John Ricci

(Grauer, Lundeen) Mark Johnson – 03:50	1 – 0
	1 – 1	05:31 – SH – Dave Easton (Stankiewicz)
	1 – 2	09:36 – PP – Mike Hartman (Markell, Shutt)
	1 – 3	26:41 – PP – Mike Hartman (Shutt, Markell)
(Scheid, Lecy) Brad Mullens – 38:07	2 – 3
	2 – 4	57:58 – GW – Paul Titanic (unassisted)
(Eaves, M. Johnson) Theran Welsh – 59:56	3 – 4

50 min
Penalties
35 min
33
Shots
36

=== National Championship ===
March 25, 1978; 7:30 pm	(E1) Boston College	3–5 (2–3, 0–1, 1–1)	(A2) Boston University	Providence Civic Center; Attendance: 11,038

Game reference
Referees: Joe Faucette; Medo Martinello

Scoring summary
Period	Team	Goal	Assist(s)	Time	Score
1st	BU	Mark Fidler – PP	Lamby and O'Callahan	0:38	1–0 BU
1st	BC	Joe Mullen	Augustine	11:00	1–1
1st	BC	Bobby Hehir	unassisted	13:26	2–1 BC
1st	BU	Dave Silk – PP	O'Callahan	14:44	2–2
1st	BU	Tony Meagher – SH	Lamby	17:24	3–2 BU
2nd	BU	Tony Meagher – GW	Boileau and Hetnik	27:05	4–2 BU
3rd	BU	Mark Fidler	Silk and Lamby	41:01	5–2 BU
3rd	BC	Steve Barger	Switaj and Kennedy	43:30	5–3 BU
Penalty summary
Period	Team	Player	Penalty	Time	PIM
1st	BC	Joe Augustine	Holding	0:09	2:00
1st	BU	Dick Lamby	Hooking	2:39	2:00
1st	BU	Jack O'Callahan	High-sticking	5:51	2:00
1st	BU	Bill LeBlond	High-sticking	9:23	2:00
1st	BC	Mike Ewanouski	Tripping	14:26	2:00
1st	BU	Bill O'Neil	Slashing	15:47	2:00
1st	BU	Bill O'Neil	High-sticking	18:07	2:00
1st	BC	Charlie Antetomaso	Tripping	18:43	2:00
2nd	BC	George Amidon	Tripping	24:28	2:00
2nd	BC	Charlie Antetomaso	Tripping	28:06	2:00
2nd	BU	Dick Lamby	High-sticking	28:29	2:00
2nd	BU	Bill LeBlond	Holding	32:56	2:00
2nd	BC	Joe Augustine	Interference	33:53	2:00
2nd	BU	Mark Fidler	Slashing	36:47	2:00
2nd	BC	Paul Hammer	Cross-checking	37:33	2:00
2nd	BC	Charlie Antetomaso	Tripping	38:20	2:00
3rd	BU	John Bethel	High-sticking	48:53	2:00
3rd	BU	John Bethel	Roughing	48:53	2:00
3rd	BC	Joe Casey	High-sticking	48:53	2:00
3rd	BC	Joe Casey	Roughing	48:53	2:00
3rd	BU	Dick Lamby	Holding	50:03	2:00
3rd	BC	Paul Barrett	High-sticking	55:18	2:00

Shots by period
Team	1	2	3	T
Boston University	13	14	9	36
Boston College	8	9	14	31

Goaltenders
Team	Name	Saves	Goals against	Time on ice
BU	Jim Craig	28	3	
BC	Paul Skidmore	31	5	

== All-Tournament Team ==
- G: Paul Skidmore (Boston College)
- D: Dick Lamby (Boston University)
- D: Jack O'Callahan* (Boston University)
- F: Mark Fidler (Boston University)
- F: Joe Mullen (Boston College)
- F: Dave Silk (Boston University)

* Most Outstanding Player(s)
