= Steve Hoar =

American hockey coach

Biographical details
- Born: 1952; Worcester, Massachusetts, U.S.
- Died: July 11, 2016 (aged 63–64); Arlington, Massachusetts, U.S.
- Education: Boston College; Boston University

Playing career
- 1972–1976: Boston College

Coaching career (HC unless noted)
- 1978–1984: Army (assistant)
- 1984–1989: Plattsburgh State
- 1994–1998: Tufts
- 2004–2007: Becker (assistant)
- 2007–2016: Becker

Head coaching record
- Overall: 257–227–28 (.529)
- Tournaments: 8–6–0 (.571)

Stephen L. Hoar (1952 – July 11, 2016) was an American ice hockey coach who led Plattsburgh State to an NCAA Division III National Championship that was later vacated.

== Career ==
Hoar grew up in the Boston area and graduated from Vermont Academy in 1970. A few years later he began attending Boston College and earned a degree in Elementary Education and Teaching. He worked as a teacher for a time but soon turned to coaching and eventually found his way behind the bench at Plattsburgh State, becoming the head coach for the men's ice hockey team in 1984.

He was an instant success as a coach, leading the team to the Frozen Four in each of his first two seasons. For his third campaign, Hoar got the team to post 33 wins, still a program record as of 2023, and win the 1987 National Championship. After two more outstanding seasons with the Cardinals, the team was rocked by allegations of NCAA violations. It was eventually confirmed that between 1985 and 1988, several players had received improper benefits from people with ties to the university including free housing, free food, small cash loans and the free use of automobiles. Not only was the program put on probation, but their entire participation in NCAA tournaments during that period was vacated. While the team was allowed to keep their win totals, they had to surrender any claim they had to the championship. As a result of the findings, Hoar was out of a job.

After his time at Plattsburgh State, Hoar returned to his studies and earned a master's degree at Boston University. Shortly afterwards, he resumed coaching and took over at Tufts. His tenure with the Jumbos started out well, with a pair of winning seasons, but two consecutive losing campaigns and no playoff victories caused the school to look elsewhere for their head coach.

Hoar returned to his day job as a recreation & skating facility director in Lexington but was eventually lured back to college when Becker decided to field an ice hockey team. Hoar first worked as an assistant, helping the club team build up to its varsity debut in 2006. However, midway through the first season, Hoar was promoted to head coach. Over the next several years, Hoar helped the team produce respectable records but nothing that could get them close to an NCAA tournament berth. In the summer of 2016, Hoar died unexpectedly in his home in Arlington, Massachusetts.

== Head coaching record ==
Record table
Season	Team	Overall	Conference	Standing	Postseason
Plattsburgh State Cardinals (ECAC West) (1984–1989)
1984–85	Plattsburgh State	26–11–0	19–4–0	2nd	NCAA Third-Place game (loss)
1985–86	Plattsburgh State	27–13–1	16–5–1	3rd	NCAA Runner-Up (vacated)
1986–87	Plattsburgh State	33–6–0	23–1–0	1st	NCAA Champion (vacated)
1987–88	Plattsburgh State	24–12–0	19–6–0	2nd	NCAA Quarterfinals (vacated)
1988–89	Plattsburgh State	20–5–1	20–5–1	2nd	None ^{†}
Plattsburgh State:		130–47–2	97–21–2		
Tufts Jumbos (ECAC Central) (1994–1998)
1994–95	Tufts	13–6–5	6–3–5	3rd	ECAC N/S/C Quarterfinals
1995–96	Tufts	13–8–2	9–5–0	3rd	ECAC N/S/C Quarterfinals
1996–97	Tufts	8–13–2	4–10–0	7th	
1997–98	Tufts	9–13–1	5–9–0	6th	
Tufts:		43–40–10	24–27–5		
Becker Hawks Independent (2006–2007)
2006–07	Becker	0–8–1 ^{‡}			
Becker:		0–8–1			
Becker Hawks (ECAC Northeast) (2007–2016)
2007–08	Becker	12–12–2	9–6–1	T–6th	ECAC Northeast Quarterfinals
2008–09	Becker	11–14–1	9–7–1	6th	ECAC Northeast Quarterfinals
2009–10	Becker	13–12–1	8–6–0	4th	ECAC Northeast Semifinals
2010–11	Becker	11–13–3	7–4–3	4th	ECAC Northeast Semifinals
2011–12	Becker	9–15–2	4–9–1	6th	ECAC Northeast Quarterfinals
2012–13	Becker	10–13–2	1–11–2	8th	
2013–14	Becker	3–18–3	2–9–2	8th	
2014–15	Becker	5–20–0	1–13–0	8th	
2015–16	Becker	10–15–1	6–9–1	7th	ECAC Northeast Quarterfinals
Becker:		84–132–15	47–74–11		
Total:		257–227–28			
National champion Postseason invitational champion Conference regular season champion Conference regular season and conference tournament champion Division regular season champion Division regular season and conference tournament champion Conference tournament champion

† Plattsburgh State voluntarily ruled itself ineligible for postseason play due to an ongoing NCAA investigation.
‡ Hoar took over in the middle of the season.
