= Peter Shier =

Canadian ice hockey player

- Born: August 12, 1955 (age 71) Toronto, Ontario, Canada
- Height: 6 ft 2 in (188 cm)
- Weight: 200 lb (91 kg; 14 st 4 lb)
- Position: Defenseman
- Shot: Left
- Played for: Cornell; Oklahoma City Stars; Baltimore Clippers; Lukko; EC Salzburg; HC La Chaux-de-Fonds; EC KAC
- WHA draft: 161st, 1975; Cincinnati Stingers
- Playing career: 1975–1984

Peter Shier (born August 12, 1955) is a Canadian former ice hockey defenseman and advertising executive. Shier was an All-American when playing for Cornell. Currently, he is the vice-president of marketing for the Ottawa Senators.

== Career ==
A graduate of Beaconsfield High School, Shier played junior hockey for the Pierrefonds Pirates. He was twice an all-star for the junior B team and began attending Cornell University in 1974. After a year with the freshman team, one of the few remaining first-year teams in the country, Shier was drafted by the Cincinnati Stingers. When he debuted for the varsity team the following year, Shier became a point-per-game player and increased his point total each season. As a senior Shier led the nation in scoring by a defenseman and helped Cornell to a second place finish in ECAC Hockey. Unfortunately, the team was upset in the conference quarterfinals and missed a chance at a tournament appearance. Later that year, after the Edmonton Oilers had obtained his rights, Shier was offered a contract to finish out the playoffs. Despite the $25,000 on the table, Shier knew that he wouldn't finish his degree if he had accepted and turned down the offer.

After graduating with a degree in hotel management, Shier began playing professionally. He played two seasons for the Oklahoma City Stars and led the team in scoring from the blueline both years. Unfortunately, the Stars weren't a good team and missed the playoff during Shier's tenure. In 1980 he travelled across the Atlantic and played several years in Europe. After a season in Finland, Shier played for two Austrian and one Swiss team over three years, finishing in the top three scorers for his teams each year.

Shier decided to retire after the 1984 season and returned home to begin his business career. When he was playing pickup hockey with Terry O’Malley, the CEO of Vickers & Benson Advertising, the company had just secured a contract with Amstel Brewery and they needed someone who knew the restaurant business. At the start Shier, admittedly, didn't know a thing about the advertising business but accepted the job and began learning as much as he could from O’Malley. Over the years he worked for several agencies including Saatchi & Saatchi and Cossette, Inc. and founded Naked Creative Consultancy in 2007. In 2024, Naked merged with another advertising firm, Blackjet. Shier later join the Ottawa Senators as their vice-president of marketing.

== Statistics ==
=== Regular season and playoffs ===
			Regular Season					Playoffs
Season	Team	League	GP	G	A	Pts	PIM	GP	G	A	Pts	PIM
1975–76	Cornell	ECAC Hockey	25	8	17	25	46	—	—	—	—	—
1976–77	Cornell	ECAC Hockey	29	16	16	32	30	—	—	—	—	—
1977–78	Cornell	ECAC Hockey	27	24	26	50	36	—	—	—	—	—
1978–79	Oklahoma City Stars	CHL	68	18	28	46	66	—	—	—	—	—
1979–80	Oklahoma City Stars	CHL	60	11	27	38	104	—	—	—	—	—
1979–80	Baltimore Clippers	EHL	3	6	3	9	5	—	—	—	—	—
1980–81	Lukko Rauma	SM-liiga	27	6	12	18	46	—	—	—	—	—
1981–82	HC Salzburg	Austria	28	17	34	51	34	—	—	—	—	—
1982–83	HC La Chaux-de-Fonds	NLB	—	26	16	42	—	—	—	—	—	—
1983–84	Klagenfurter AC	Austria	34	11	34	45	42	—	—	—	—	—
NCAA totals			81	48	59	107	112	—	—	—	—	—
CHL totals			128	29	55	84	170	—	—	—	—	—
Austria totals			62	28	68	96	76	—	—	—	—	—

== Awards and honors ==
Award	Year
All-ECAC Hockey First Team	1977–78
AHCA East All-American	1977–78
