= Ernie Glanville =

Canadian ice hockey player

- Born: 1954 (age 71–72) New Westminster, British Columbia, Canada
- Height: 5 ft 9 in (175 cm)
- Weight: 161 lb (73 kg; 11 st 7 lb)
- Position: Goaltender
- Caught: Left
- Played for: Denver
- Playing career: 1974–1978

Ernest Glanville is a Canadian retired ice hockey goaltender who was an All-American for Denver.

== Career ==
Glanville was recruited to Denver University after the NCAA began cracking down on the team's use of overaged Canadian junior players. Since his room and board had been paid by the BCHL, Glanville was initially ruled ineligible by the NCAA. Denver appealed on the grounds that the money he was paid was far below what it would have cost for travel expenses had he been living at home. Ultimately he was allowed to play and Glanville began sharing the crease with several other goaltenders over his first three seasons.

During this time, Denver wasn't a particularly good team as it was still recovering from having its participation in the 1973 Tournament vacated. As a result, Glanville's numbers weren't anything to write home about. His goals against average improved as a sophomore but ballooned to 5.55 as a junior. During that season Jim Bales, a St. Louis Blues draft pick, took over as the primary starter and Glanville was limited to just 9 appearances in 40 games. The Pioneers too had recovered a bit and finished 4th in the WCHA. That offseason, however, long-time head coach Murray Armstrong retired and was replaced by Marshall Johnston. The coaching change brought with it a resurgence to Glanville's game and the senior netminder saw his playing time increase. While Bales made more starts, Glanville led the team with a 2.67 GAA (second in the nation) and the country with a .908 save percentage. He played the final 17 games of the season, going 15–1–1 and recorded a 13-game winning streak. Glanville helped the Pioneers set a new program record with 33 wins in a single season and reached the second round of the WCHA Tournament. He was selected as an All-American and First Team All-Conference and retired as a player after the season.

== Statistics ==
=== Regular season and playoffs ===
			Regular season									Playoffs
Season	Team	League	GP	W	L	T	MIN	GA	SO	GAA	SV%	GP	W	L	MIN	GA	SO	GAA	SV%
1973–74	Merritt Centennials	BCHL	—	—	—	—	—	—	—	—	—	—	—	—	—	—	—	—	—
1974–75	Denver	WCHA	13	5	7	1	—	61	0	4.80	.862	—	—	—	—	—	—	—	—
1975–76	Denver	WCHA	19	9	10	0	—	—	0	4.10	.882	—	—	—	—	—	—	—	—
1976–77	Denver	WCHA	9	3	5	1	—	—	0	5.55	.841	—	—	—	—	—	—	—	—
1977–78	Denver	WCHA	17	15	1	1	1084	45	2	2.67	.908	—	—	—	—	—	—	—	—
NCAA totals			58	32	23	3	—	—	2	—	—	—	—	—	—	—	—	—	—

== Awards and honors ==
Award	Year
All-WCHA First Team	1977–78
AHCA West All-American	1977–78
