= Mike Laycock =

Canadian ice hockey player

- Born: January 28, 1957 (age 69) Barrie, Ontario, Canada
- Height: 5 ft 10 in (178 cm)
- Weight: 174 lb (79 kg; 12 st 6 lb)
- Position: Goaltender
- Played for: Brown
- NHL draft: 172nd, 1977; Philadelphia Flyers
- Playing career: 1975–1984

Michael E. Laycock is a Canadian retired ice hockey goaltender who was an All-American for Brown.

== Career ==
Laycock began attending Brown University in 1975 and backed-up the Bears' starter Kevin McCabe for his first two seasons. Despite seeing relatively little playing time, he was drafted in the 12th round of the 1977 NHL Draft. The following season he made the transition into the starting role and starred for the team. Brown finished 6th in the ECAC Hockey standings and was one of the top defensive teams in the conference. He was named an All-American that season and recorded the Bears' first shutout in four years.

In Laycock's senior season the team didn't see much success but he was still held in high regard. Laycock received two team awards, one for being the senior who had most improved over his career and another for academic excellence. After graduating with a degree in economics, Laycock played one game of professional hockey before retiring and beginning his career as an accountant. He wasn't completely through with the game, however, and appeared in senior hockey games in the 1980s. Laycock spent his professional career working for BDO Dunwody, eventually becoming a partner with the firm.

Laycock was inducted into the Brown athletic Hall of Fame in 1989.

== Statistics ==
=== Regular season and playoffs ===
			Regular season									Playoffs
Season	Team	League	GP	W	L	T	MIN	GA	SO	GAA	SV%	GP	W	L	MIN	GA	SO	GAA	SV%
1975–76	Brown	ECAC Hockey	10	2	0	0	211	19	0	5.42	.832	—	—	—	—	—	—	—	—
1976–77	Brown	ECAC Hockey	11	—	—	—	573	41	0	4.26	.866	—	—	—	—	—	—	—	—
1977–78	Brown	ECAC Hockey	—	—	—	—	—	69	1	—	.901	—	—	—	—	—	—	—	—
1978–79	Brown	ECAC Hockey	—	—	—	—	—	—	—	—	—	—	—	—	—	—	—	—	—
1979–80	Hampton Aces	EHL	1	—	—	—	—	—	—	—	—	—	—	—	—	—	—	—	—
NCAA totals			53	—	—	—	—	—	1	4.13	.877	—	—	—	—	—	—	—	—

== Awards and honors ==
Award	Year
All-ECAC Hockey First Team	1977–78
AHCA East All-American	1977–78
