= Curt Giles =

Canadian ice hockey player (born 1958)

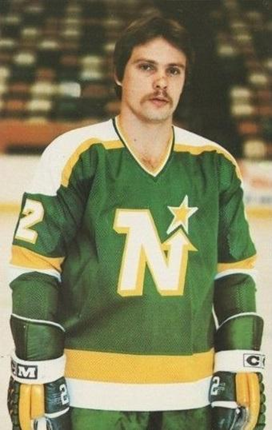
- Born: November 30, 1958 (age 67) The Pas, Manitoba, Canada
- Height: 5 ft 8 in (173 cm)
- Weight: 180 lb (82 kg; 12 st 12 lb)
- Position: Defence
- Shot: Left
- Played for: Minnesota North Stars; New York Rangers; St. Louis Blues
- National team: Canada
- NHL draft: 54th overall, 1978; Minnesota North Stars
- Playing career: 1979–1993
Medal record
Representing Canada
Ice hockey
World Championships
Bronze medal – third place	1982 Finland

Curtis Jon Giles (born November 30, 1958) is a Canadian former professional ice hockey defenceman.

Selected by the Minnesota North Stars in the 1978 NHL entry draft, Giles had two tenures with the North Stars (1979–86 and 1987–91). During each, his steady defensive play helped guide the North Stars to appearances in the 1981 and 1991 Stanley Cup Final. Giles also played for the New York Rangers and St. Louis Blues.

He had a portion of his left ring finger amputated on March 24, 1986 in order to compete in the 1986 Stanley Cup playoffs. The finger had a tumor in the bone and forced him to miss the end of the 1985-86 regular-season.

He is the head hockey coach at Edina High School, Minnesota. His team won the state title in 2010, 2013, 2014, 2019 and 2024.

== Awards and honours ==
Award	Year
All-WCHA First Team	1977–78
AHCA West All-American	1977–78
All-WCHA First Team	1978–79
AHCA West All-American	1978–79

- World Championship bronze medalist (1982)
- Olympic silver medalist (1992)
- Honoured Member of the Manitoba Hockey Hall of Fame

== Career statistics ==
=== Regular season and playoffs ===
			Regular season					Playoffs
Season	Team	League	GP	G	A	Pts	PIM	GP	G	A	Pts	PIM
1973–74	Humboldt Broncos	SJHL	49	10	13	23	39	—	—	—	—	—
1974–75	Humboldt Broncos	SJHL	—	—	—	—	—	—	—	—	—	—
1975–76	Minnesota–Duluth Bulldogs	WCHA	34	5	17	22	76	—	—	—	—	—
1976–77	Minnesota–Duluth Bulldogs	WCHA	37	12	37	49	64	—	—	—	—	—
1977–78	Minnesota–Duluth Bulldogs	WCHA	34	11	36	47	62	—	—	—	—	—
1978–79	Minnesota–Duluth Bulldogs	WCHA	30	3	38	41	38	—	—	—	—	—
1979–80	Minnesota North Stars	NHL	37	2	7	9	31	12	2	4	6	10
1979–80	Oklahoma City Stars	CHL	42	4	24	28	35	—	—	—	—	—
1980–81	Minnesota North Stars	NHL	67	5	22	27	56	19	1	4	5	14
1981–82	Minnesota North Stars	NHL	74	3	12	15	87	4	0	0	0	2
1982–83	Minnesota North Stars	NHL	76	2	21	23	70	5	0	2	2	6
1983–84	Minnesota North Stars	NHL	70	6	22	28	59	16	1	3	4	25
1984–85	Minnesota North Stars	NHL	77	5	25	30	49	9	0	0	0	17
1985–86	Minnesota North Stars	NHL	69	6	21	27	30	5	0	1	1	10
1986–87	Minnesota North Stars	NHL	11	0	3	3	4	—	—	—	—	—
1986–87	New York Rangers	NHL	61	2	17	19	50	5	0	0	0	6
1987–88	New York Rangers	NHL	13	0	0	0	10	—	—	—	—	—
1987–88	Minnesota North Stars	NHL	59	1	12	13	66	—	—	—	—	—
1988–89	Minnesota North Stars	NHL	76	5	10	15	77	5	0	0	0	4
1989–90	Minnesota North Stars	NHL	74	1	12	13	48	7	0	1	1	6
1990–91	Minnesota North Stars	NHL	70	4	10	14	48	10	1	0	1	16
1991–92	Canada	Intl	31	3	6	9	37	—	—	—	—	—
1991–92	St. Louis Blues	NHL	13	1	1	2	8	3	1	1	2	0
1992–93	St. Louis Blues	NHL	48	0	4	4	40	3	0	0	0	2
NHL totals			895	43	199	242	733	103	6	16	22	118

=== International ===
Year	Team	Event	GP	G	A	Pts	PIM
1982	Canada	WC	10	0	1	1	12
1992	Canada	OLY	8	1	0	1	6
Senior totals			18	1	1	2	18

Sporting positions
Preceded by Craig Hartsburg	Minnesota North Stars captain 1989–91	Succeeded by Mark Tinordi
