= 1977–78 NCAA Division I men's ice hockey season =

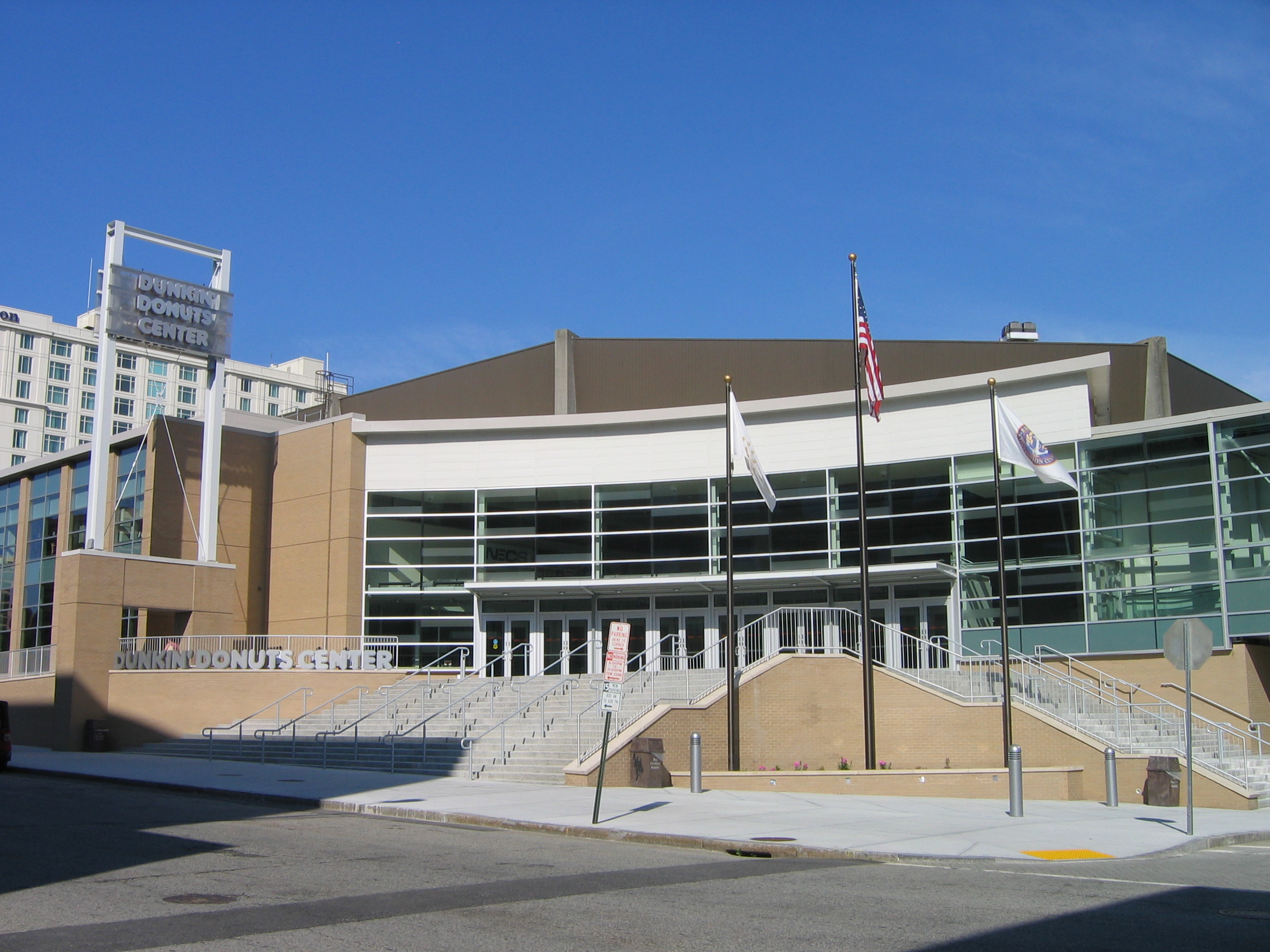
- The Providence Civic Center served as the host for the 1978 Frozen Four
- Duration: October 1977– March 25, 1978
- NCAA tournament: 1978
- National championship: Providence Civic Center; Providence, Rhode Island
- NCAA champion: Boston University

The 1977–78 NCAA Division I men's ice hockey season began in October 1977 and concluded with the 1978 NCAA Division I Men's Ice Hockey Tournament's championship game on March 25, 1978 at the Providence Civic Center in Providence, Rhode Island. This was the 31st season in which an NCAA ice hockey championship was held and is the 84th year overall where an NCAA school fielded a team.

== Season Outlook ==
=== Pre-season poll ===
The top teams in the nation voted on by coaches before the start of the season. The poll was compiled by radio station WMPL.

WMPL Poll
Rank	Team
1	Michigan
2	Wisconsin
3	Boston University
4	Colorado College
5 (tie)	Minnesota
5 (tie)	Denver
7	Michigan Tech
8	Saint Louis
9	Bowling Green
10	Clarkson

== Regular season ==
=== Season tournaments ===
Tournament	Dates	Teams	Champion
North Country Thanksgiving Festival	November 24–26	4	Clarkson
Blue–Green Invitational	December 16–17	4	Dartmouth
Old Colony Invitational	December 19–21	4	Saint Louis
Great Lakes Invitational	December 28–29	4	Michigan Tech
Broadmoor Holiday Tournament	December 28–30	4	Denver
Rensselaer Holiday Tournament	December 28–30	4	Rensselaer
Cornell Holiday Festival	December 29–30	4	Cornell
Syracuse Invitational	December 29–30	4	Clarkson
Down East Classic	January 4–5	4	Bowdoin
Beanpot	February 6, March 1	4	Boston University

=== Standings ===
1977–78 Big Ten standings
	Conference							Overall					
	GP	W	L	T	PTS	GF	GA	GP	W	L	T	GF	GA
Wisconsin†	12	8	3	1	17	59	44	43	28	12	3	214	149
Michigan	12	6	5	1	13	65	59	36	15	20	1	169	192
Minnesota	12	6	6	0	12	48	41	38	22	14	2	171	150
Michigan State	12	2	8	2	6	42	70	36	7	27	2	130	201
† indicates conference regular season champion

1977–78 Central Collegiate Hockey Association standings
	Conference							Overall					
	GP	W	L	T	PTS	GF	GA	GP	W	L	T	GF	GA
Bowling Green†*	18	15	3	0	30	96	42	39	31	8	0	196	108
Saint Louis	20	10	10	0	20	73	71	40	21	17	2	134	99
Northern Michigan	20	8	10	2	18	77	84	34	19	13	2	150	129
Ohio State	20	9	11	0	18	73	89	35	16	18	1	144	154
Lake Superior State	18	7	10	1	15	73	101	32	18	13	1	144	148
Western Michigan	20	7	12	1	15	83	88	33	15	17	1	175	140
Championship: Bowling Green † indicates conference regular season champion * indicates conference tournament champion

1977–78 ECAC Hockey standings
	Conference							Overall					
	GP	W	L	T	Pct.	GF	GA	GP	W	L	T	GF	GA
Boston University†	22	21	1	0	.955	135	85	32	30	2	0	199	126
Cornell	22	16	5	1	.750	161	79	27	20	6	1	195	100
Clarkson	23	16	7	0	.696	139	109	30	19	11	0	174	145
Rensselaer	21	13	8	0	.619	100	83	29	19	9	1	162	117
Boston College*	23	14	9	0	.609	117	116	34	24	10	0	186	147
Brown	23	13	9	1	.587	101	78	29	14	14	1	117	102
Providence	23	12	9	2	.565	116	95	34	17	15	2	172	146
New Hampshire	25	14	11	0	.560	154	124	30	18	12	0	197	150
Yale	26	12	13	1	.481	92	114	26	12	13	1	92	114
Harvard	23	10	13	0	.435	87	112	26	12	14	0	99	122
Dartmouth	23	9	14	0	.391	97	114	26	11	15	0	107	129
Vermont	23	9	14	0	.391	94	108	31	15	16	0	139	137
St. Lawrence	22	8	14	0	.364	91	124	30	12	18	0	124	152
Princeton	21	7	13	1	.357	83	89	25	9	14	2	102	102
Northeastern	24	7	16	1	.313	131	128	28	10	17	1	155	142
Pennsylvania	21	5	14	2	.286	82	123	26	7	17	2	98	145
Colgate	25	4	20	1	.180	81	180	28	5	22	1	91	187
Championship: Boston College † indicates conference regular season champion * indicates conference tournament champion

1977–78 NCAA Division I Independent ice hockey standings
	Conference							Overall					
	GP	W	L	T	PTS	GF	GA	GP	W	L	T	GF	GA
Air Force	0	0	0	0	-	-	-	28	9	17	0	121	144

1977–78 Western Collegiate Hockey Association standings
	Conference							Overall					
	GP	W	L	T	PTS	GF	GA	GP	W	L	T	GF	GA
Denver†	32	27	5	0	54	192	112	40	33	6	1	235	140
Wisconsin*	32	21	9	2	44	127	113	43	28	12	3	214	149
Michigan Tech	32	21	11	0	42	150	123	40	25	14	1	184	157
Minnesota	32	18	13	1	37	143	134	38	22	14	2	171	150
Colorado College*	32	13	19	0	26	162	172	41	18	22	1	212	218
North Dakota	32	13	19	0	26	146	167	38	15	22	1	172	192
Minnesota-Duluth	32	12	19	1	25	135	155	37	14	22	1	155	182
Notre Dame	32	12	19	1	25	117	147	38	12	24	2	137	186
Michigan	32	12	19	1	25	149	175	36	15	20	1	169	192
Michigan State	32	7	23	2	16	119	182	36	7	27	2	130	201
Championship: Wisconsin, Colorado College † indicates conference regular season champion * indicates conference tournament champion

=== Final regular season polls ===
The final top 10 teams as ranked by coaches (WMPL) before the conference tournament finals.

WMPL Coaches Poll
Ranking	Team
1	Denver
2	Boston University
3	Wisconsin
4	Michigan Tech
5	Cornell
6	Bowling Green State
7	Minnesota
8	Clarkson
9	Rensselaer
10	Boston College

== 1978 NCAA Tournament ==
First Round; March 18–19
W2	Colorado College	3
A1	Bowling Green	5
E2	Providence	3
A2	Boston University	5

Semifinals; March 23–24
E1	Boston College	6
A1	Bowling Green	2
W1	Wisconsin	2
A2	Boston University	5

National Championship; March 25
E1	Boston College	3
A2	Boston University	5
Third Place Game
W1	Wisconsin	3
A1	Bowling Green	4

Note: * denotes overtime period(s)

== Player stats ==
=== Scoring leaders ===
The following players led the league in points at the conclusion of the season.

GP = Games played; G = Goals; A = Assists; Pts = Points; PIM = Penalty minutes

Player	Class	Team	GP	G	A	Pts	PIM
Mike Eaves	Senior	Wisconsin	43	31	58	89	16
Mark Johnson	Sophomore	Wisconsin	42	48	38	86	24
Lance Nethery	Junior	Cornell	26	23	60	83	12
Doug Berry	Junior	Denver	40	36	46	82	36
Greg Whyte	Freshman	Colorado College	41	28	54	82	42
Dave Delich	Junior	Colorado College	41	27	53	80	20
Ralph Cox	Junior	New Hampshire	30	31	39	70	44
Perry Schnarr	Sophomore	Denver	37	35	33	68	35
Joe Mullen	Junior	Boston College	34	34	34	68	12
Jim Warner	Senior	Colorado College	38	27	41	68	50

=== Leading goaltenders ===
The following goaltenders led the league in goals against average at the end of the regular season while playing at least 33% of their team's total minutes.

GP = Games played; Min = Minutes played; W = Wins; L = Losses; OT = Overtime/shootout losses; GA = Goals against; SO = Shutouts; SV% = Save percentage; GAA = Goals against average

Player	Class	Team	GP	Min	W	L	OT	GA	SO	SV%	GAA
Brian Stankiewicz	Freshman	Bowling Green	30	1718	-	-	-	74	2	.907	2.58
Ernie Glanville	Senior	Denver	17	1084	15	1	1	45	2	.908	2.67
Steve Napier	Sophomore	Cornell	16	-	-	-	-	-	-	.899	3.19
Steve Weeks	Sophomore	Northern Michigan	19	1015	10	5	2	56	1	.901	3.31
Mark Holden	Sophomore	Brown	10	590	4	6	0	33	1	-	3.36
Julian Baretta	Junior	Wisconsin	33	1976	20	10	3	114	0	.893	3.46
John Rockwell	Junior	Michigan Tech	21	1235	-	-	-	72	1	.903	3.49
Brian O'Connell	Senior	Saint Louis	39	2364	-	-	-	139	2	-	3.53
Jim Craig	Sophomore	Boston University	16	967	16	0	0	60	0	-	3.72
Paul Skidmore	Sophomore	Boston College	25	1417	18	7	0	88	2	-	3.73

== Awards ==
=== NCAA ===
Award		Recipient
Spencer Penrose Award		Jack Parker, Boston University
Most Outstanding Player in NCAA Tournament		Jack O'Callahan, Boston University
AHCA All-American Teams
East Team	Position	West Team
Mike Laycock, Brown	G	Ernie Glanville, Denver
Bill Blackwood, Clarkson	D	Curt Giles, Minnesota-Duluth
Peter Shier, Cornell	D	Ken Morrow, Bowling Green
Ralph Cox, New Hampshire	F	Doug Berry, Denver
Joe Mullen, Boston College	F	Mike Eaves, Wisconsin
Lance Nethery, Cornell	F	Mark Johnson, Wisconsin

=== CCHA ===
Award		Recipient
Player of the Year		John Markell, Bowling Green
		Don Waddell, Northern Michigan
Coach of the Year		Ron Mason, Bowling Green
All-CCHA Teams
First Team	Position	Second Team
Brian Stankiewicz, Bowling Green	G	Brian O'Connell, Saint Louis
Ken Morrow, Bowling Green	D	Doug Butler, Saint Louis
Don Waddell, Northern Michigan	D	Kent Jackson, Saint Louis
John Markell, Bowling Green	F	Bernie Saunders, Western Michigan
Gary Murphy, Saint Louis	F	Paul Cappuccio, Western Michigan
Bill Joyce, Northern Michigan	F	Byron Shutt, Bowling Green

=== ECAC ===
Award		Recipient
Player of the Year		Lance Nethery, Cornell
Rookie of the Year		Mark Fidler, Boston University
Most Outstanding Player in Tournament		Joe Mullen, Boston College
All-ECAC Hockey Teams
First Team	Position	Second Team
Mike Laycock, Brown	G	Ian Harrison, Rensselaer
Peter Shier, Cornell	D	Bill Blackwood, Clarkson
Jack O'Callahan, Boston University	D	Jack Hughes, Harvard
	D	Dick Lamby, Boston University
Lance Nethery, Cornell	F	Dave Silk, Boston University
Joe Mullen, Boston College	F	Marty McNally, Clarkson
Ralph Cox, New Hampshire	F	Kevin Zappia, Clarkson

=== WCHA ===
Award		Recipient
Most Valuable Player		Mike Eaves, Wisconsin
Freshman of the Year		Greg Whyte, Colorado College
Coach of the Year		Marshall Johnston, Denver
All-WCHA Teams
First Team	Position	Second Team
Ernie Glanville, Denver	G	Julian Baretta, Wisconsin
Curt Giles, Minnesota-Duluth	D	Greg Woods, Denver
Bill Himmelright, North Dakota	D	Lex Hudson, Denver
Doug Berry, Denver	F	Greg Whyte, Colorado College
Mark Johnson, Wisconsin	F	Steve Christoff, Minnesota
Mike Eaves, Wisconsin	F	Dave Delich, Colorado College
	F	Perry Schnarr, Denver

== 1978 NHL entry draft ==
Round	Pick	Player	College	Conference	NHL team
2	24	Steve Christoff	Minnesota	WCHA	Minnesota North Stars
2	25	Mike Meeker	Wisconsin	WCHA	Pittsburgh Penguins
3	37	Gord Salt	Michigan Tech	WCHA	Philadelphia Flyers
3	41	Paul Messier	Denver	WCHA	Colorado Rockies
3	44	Dean Turner	Michigan	WCHA	New York Rangers
3	49	Rob McClanahan	Minnesota	WCHA	Buffalo Sabres
4	54	Curt Giles	Minnesota–Duluth	WCHA	Minnesota North Stars
4	59	Dave Silk	Boston University	ECAC Hockey	New York Rangers
5	70	Roy Kerling	Cornell	ECAC Hockey	Minnesota North Stars
5	84	Greg Hay	Michigan Tech	WCHA	New York Islanders
5	85	Daryl MacLeod	Boston University	ECAC Hockey	Boston Bruins
6	87	Bob Bergloff	Minnesota	WCHA	Minnesota North Stars
6	88	Vince Magnan	Denver	WCHA	Washington Capitals
6	91	John Hynes	Harvard	ECAC Hockey	Colorado Rockies
6	93	Tom Laidlaw	Northern Michigan	CCHA	New York Rangers
6	96	Dave Feamster	Colorado College	WCHA	Chicago Black Hawks
6	97	Greg Meredith	Notre Dame	WCHA	Atlanta Flames
6	100	Mark Taylor	North Dakota	WCHA	Philadelphia Flyers
6	102	Jeff Brubaker ^{‡}	Michigan State	WCHA	Boston Bruins
7	108	Andy Clark	Lake Superior State	CCHA	Colorado Rockies
7	111	Don Waddell	Northern Michigan	CCHA	Los Angeles Kings
7	117	Mike Ewanouski	Boston College	ECAC Hockey	Philadelphia Flyers
7	119	Murray Skinner	Lake Superior State	CCHA	Boston Bruins
7	120	Jim Lawson	Brown	ECAC Hockey	Montreal Canadiens
8	121	Mike Cotter	Bowling Green	CCHA	Minnesota North Stars
8	124	Steve O'Neill	Providence	ECAC Hockey	Vancouver Canucks
8	125	John Olver	Michigan	WCHA	Colorado Rockies
8	127	Greg Kostenko	Ohio State	CCHA	New York Rangers
8	130	Sandy Ross	Colgate	ECAC Hockey	Chicago Black Hawks
8	133	Eric Strobel	Minnesota	WCHA	Buffalo Sabres
8	136	Bobby Hehir	Boston College	ECAC Hockey	Boston Bruins
8	137	Larry Landon	Rensselaer	ECAC Hockey	Montreal Canadiens
9	140	Tony Meagher	Boston University	ECAC Hockey	St. Louis Blues
9	141	Charlie Antetomaso	Boston College	ECAC Hockey	Vancouver Canucks
9	145	Rick Scully	Brown	ECAC Hockey	Los Angeles Kings
9	148	Doug Todd	Michigan	WCHA	Atlanta Flames
9	149	Mike Waghorne	New Hampshire	ECAC Hockey	Toronto Maple Leafs
9	151	Greg Francis	St. Lawrence	ECAC Hockey	Philadelphia Flyers
9	152	Paul Joswiak	Minnesota	WCHA	New York Islanders
9	154	Kevin Constantine	Rensselaer	ECAC Hockey	Montreal Canadiens
10	155	Mike Seide ^{†}	Northern Michigan	CCHA	Minnesota North Stars
10	159	Jeff Jensen	Lake Superior State	CCHA	Colorado Rockies
10	161	Mark Rodrigues	Yale	ECAC Hockey	New York Rangers
10	164	Glenn Van	Colorado College	WCHA	Chicago Black Hawks
10	168	Don Lucia	Notre Dame	WCHA	Philadelphia Flyers
10	169	Scott Cameron	Notre Dame	WCHA	New York Islanders
10	170	Dan Lerg	Michigan	WCHA	St. Louis Blues
11	176	Steve Weeks	Northern Michigan	CCHA	New York Rangers
11	177	Jim Armstrong	Clarkson	ECAC Hockey	Los Angeles Kings
11	182	Mark Berge	North Dakota	WCHA	Philadelphia Flyers
11	183	Ken Moore	Clarkson	ECAC Hockey	Philadelphia Flyers
11	185	John Sullivan	Providence	ECAC Hockey	St. Louis Blues
12	187	Paul Hogan ^{‡}	Denver	WCHA	Washington Capitals
12	189	Steve Barger	Boston College	ECAC Hockey	Washington Capitals
12	191	Don Boyd	Rensselaer	ECAC Hockey	St. Louis Blues
12	195	Jim Olson ^{†}	Western Michigan	CCHA	Philadelphia Flyers
12	197	Paul Stasiuk	Providence	ECAC Hockey	St. Louis Blues
13	202	Rod Pacholzuk	Michigan	WCHA	Washington Capitals
13	206	Chris McLaughlin	Dartmouth	ECAC Hockey	New York Rangers
13	212	Jeff Mars	Michigan	WCHA	Montreal Canadiens
14	214	John Cochrane	Harvard	ECAC Hockey	St. Louis Blues
14	216	Joe Casey	Boston College	ECAC Hockey	St. Louis Blues
14	217	Todd Johnson	Boston University	ECAC Hockey	New York Rangers
14	218	Jim Farrell	Princeton	ECAC Hockey	St. Louis Blues
14	220	Frank Johnson	Providence	ECAC Hockey	St. Louis Blues
14	221	Blair Wheeler	Yale	ECAC Hockey	St. Louis Blues
14	222	Greg Tignanelli	Northern Michigan	CCHA	Montreal Canadiens
15	225	George Goulakos	St. Lawrence	ECAC Hockey	Montreal Canadiens
16	226	Brian Crawley	St. Lawrence	ECAC Hockey	Detroit Red Wings
16	227	Ken Moodie	Colgate	ECAC Hockey	Montreal Canadiens
17	229	Serge Leblanc	Vermont	ECAC Hockey	Montreal Canadiens
19	231	Chris Nilan	Northeastern	ECAC Hockey	Montreal Canadiens
20	232	Rick Wilson	St. Lawrence	ECAC Hockey	Montreal Canadiens

† incoming freshman
^{‡ Hogan and Brubaker had already left school prior to this season.}

== See also ==
- 1977–78 NCAA Division II men's ice hockey season
- 1977–78 NCAA Division III men's ice hockey season
