= Dick Lamby =

American ice hockey player (born 1955)

- Born: May 3, 1955 (age 70) Auburn, Massachusetts, U.S.
- Height: 6 ft 1 in (185 cm)
- Weight: 209 lb (95 kg; 14 st 13 lb)
- Position: Defense
- Played for: St. Louis Blues
- National team: United States
- NHL draft: 135th overall, 1975; St. Louis Blues
- Playing career: 1978–1982

Richard A. Lamby (born May 3, 1955) is an American former professional ice hockey defenseman. He played 22 games in the National Hockey League with the St. Louis Blues from 1978 to 1980. The rest of his career, which lasted from 1978 to 1982, was mainly spent in the minor leagues. In college, he played for Salem State University and Boston University's men's hockey teams from 1974 to 1978s. Internationally, Lamby played for the American national team at the 1976 Winter Olympics, and at the 1978 World Championships.

== Career statistics ==
=== Regular season and playoffs ===
| | | | Regular season | | | | | Playoffs |
| Season | Team | League | GP | G | A | Pts | PIM | GP | G | A | Pts | PIM |
|---|---|---|---|---|---|---|---|---|---|---|---|---|
| 1974–75 | Salem State College | ECAC 2 | 26 | 25 | 32 | 57 | 54 | — | — | — | — | — |
| 1975–76 | American National Team | Intl | 63 | 12 | 35 | 47 | 146 | — | — | — | — | — |
| 1976–77 | Boston University | ECAC | 24 | 9 | 36 | 45 | 44 | — | — | — | — | — |
| 1977–78 | Boston University | ECAC | 30 | 15 | 44 | 59 | 64 | — | — | — | — | — |
| 1978–79 | St. Louis Blues | NHL | 9 | 0 | 4 | 4 | 12 | — | — | — | — | — |
| 1978–79 | Salt Lake Golden Eagles | CHL | 60 | 4 | 15 | 19 | 122 | 10 | 2 | 5 | 7 | 21 |
| 1979–80 | St. Louis Blues | NHL | 12 | 0 | 1 | 1 | 10 | — | — | — | — | — |
| 1979–80 | Salt Lake Golden Eagles | CHL | 49 | 3 | 14 | 17 | 93 | — | — | — | — | — |
| 1980–81 | St. Louis Blues | NHL | 1 | 0 | 0 | 0 | 0 | — | — | — | — | — |
| 1980–81 | Salt Lake Golden Eagles | CHL | 53 | 7 | 30 | 37 | 74 | 14 | 1 | 5 | 6 | 23 |
| 1981–82 | Muskegon Mohawks | IHL | 16 | 2 | 5 | 7 | 25 | — | — | — | — | — |
| 1981–82 | Dallas Black Hawks | CHL | 22 | 0 | 7 | 7 | 53 | — | — | — | — | — |
| 1981–82 | Fort Worth Texans | CHL | 31 | 4 | 6 | 10 | 41 | — | — | — | — | — |
| CHL totals | | | 215 | 18 | 72 | 90 | 383 | 24 | 3 | 10 | 13 | 44 |
| NHL totals | | | 22 | 0 | 5 | 5 | 22 | — | — | — | — | — |

=== International ===
| Year | Team | Event | GP | G | A | Pts | PIM |
|---|---|---|---|---|---|---|---|
| 1976 | United States | OLY | 6 | 0 | 2 | 2 | 12 |
| 1978 | United States | WC | 7 | 0 | 2 | 2 | 20 |
| Senior totals | | | 13 | 0 | 4 | 4 | 32 |

== Awards and honors ==
| Award | Year |
|---|---|
| All-ECAC Hockey Second Team | 1977–78 |
| All-NCAA All-Tournament Team | 1978 |
