= John Bethel =

Canadian ice hockey player (born 1957)

- Born: January 15, 1957 (age 69) Montreal, Quebec, Canada
- Height: 5 ft 11 in (180 cm)
- Weight: 185 lb (84 kg; 13 st 3 lb)
- Position: Left wing
- Shot: Left
- Played for: Winnipeg Jets
- NHL draft: 98th overall, 1977; New York Rangers
- Playing career: 1979–1983

John Charles Bethel (born January 15, 1957) is a Canadian former professional ice hockey left winger. He played in the National Hockey League (NHL) for the original Winnipeg Jets.

Bethel was born in Montreal, Quebec. He played three seasons at Boston University from 1976 to 1979, where in 1977-78 he was second in team scoring to Mike Fidler with 63 points. Bethel was drafted by the New York Rangers in the sixth round of the 1977 NHL amateur draft, but never signed with the Rangers.

== Career statistics ==
=== Regular season and playoffs ===
			Regular season					Playoffs
Season	Team	League	GP	G	A	Pts	PIM	GP	G	A	Pts	PIM
1974–75	Pierrefonds Pirates	QJHL	—	—	—	—	—	—	—	—	—	—
1975–76	Pierrefonds Pirates	QHJL	15	17	21	38	—	—	—	—	—	—
1976–77	Boston University	ECAC	33	14	12	26	30	—	—	—	—	—
1977–78	Boston University	ECAC	30	25	38	63	53	—	—	—	—	—
1978–79	Boston University	ECAC	19	5	10	15	28	—	—	—	—	—
1979–80	Winnipeg Jets	NHL	17	0	2	2	4	—	—	—	—	—
1979–80	Tulsa Oilers	CHL	45	17	11	28	50	—	—	—	—	—
1980–81	Tulsa Oilers	CHL	58	23	35	58	51	—	—	—	—	—
1981–82	Tulsa Oilers	CHL	74	19	51	70	83	3	0	0	0	2
1982–83	Sherbrooke Jets	AHL	63	24	26	50	26	—	—	—	—	—
NHL totals			17	0	2	2	4	—	—	—	—	—
