= 1978 CCHA men's ice hockey tournament =

1978 CCHA Men's ice hockey tournament
- Dates: March 3–11, 1978
- Teams: 4
- Finals site: BGSU Ice Arena; Bowling Green, Ohio
- Champions: Bowling Green (3rd title)
- Winning coach: Ron Mason (2nd title)
- CCHA Men's Ice Hockey Tournaments

The 1978 CCHA Men's Ice Hockey Tournament was the seventh CCHA Men's Ice Hockey Tournament. It was played between March 3 and March 11, 1978. All games were played at BGSU Ice Arena in Bowling Green, Ohio, the home venue of the Bowling Green Falcons. By winning the tournament, Bowling Green received the Central Collegiate Hockey Association's invitation to play in a first-round game created to allow entrance into the tournament for the CCHA.

== Format ==
The tournament featured two rounds of play. Only the top four teams in the conference standings were eligible for postseason play. Each of the two rounds were structured so that the two teams facing one another would play two games and the winner would be decided by the goal differential totals of the combined scores. In the semifinal the first and fourth seeds and the second and third seeds were matched as opponents. The victorious teams would then compete in the finals for the conference championship. The tournament champion was invited to play in a first-round game in the 1978 NCAA Division I Men's Ice Hockey Tournament.

== Conference standings ==
Note: GP = Games played; W = Wins; L = Losses; T = Ties; PTS = Points; GF = Goals For; GA = Goals Against

1977–78 Central Collegiate Hockey Association standings
	Conference							Overall					
	GP	W	L	T	PTS	GF	GA	GP	W	L	T	GF	GA
Bowling Green†*	18	15	3	0	30	96	42	39	31	8	0	196	108
Saint Louis	20	10	10	0	20	73	71	40	21	17	2	134	99
Northern Michigan	20	8	10	2	18	77	84	34	19	13	2	150	129
Ohio State	20	9	11	0	18	73	89	35	16	18	1	144	154
Lake Superior State	18	7	10	1	15	73	101	32	18	13	1	144	148
Western Michigan	20	7	12	1	15	83	88	33	15	17	1	175	140
Championship: Bowling Green † indicates conference regular season champion * indicates conference tournament champion

== Bracket ==
Semifinals; March 3–4
1	Bowling Green	3	4
4	Ohio State	1	2
2	Saint Louis	6	4
3	Northern Michigan	2	4

Championship; March 10–11
1	Bowling Green	3	10
2	Saint Louis	1	2

Note: * denotes overtime period(s)

=== Semifinals ===
==== (1) Bowling Green vs. (4) Ohio State ====
March 3	Bowling Green	3 – 1	Ohio State	BGSU Ice Arena

March 4	Bowling Green	4 – 2	Ohio State	BGSU Ice Arena

Bowling Green won series 7-3

==== (2) Saint Louis vs. (3) Northern Michigan ====
March 3	Saint Louis	6 – 2	Northern Michigan	BGSU Ice Arena

March 4	Saint Louis	4 – 4	Northern Michigan	BGSU Ice Arena

Saint Louis won series 10-6

=== Championship ===
==== (1) Bowling Green vs. (2) Saint Louis ====
March 10	Bowling Green	3 – 1	Saint Louis	BGSU Ice Arena

March 11	Bowling Green	10 – 2	Saint Louis	BGSU Ice Arena

Bowling Green won series 13-3

== Tournament awards ==
=== MVP ===
- None
