= 1978 ECAC Hockey men's ice hockey tournament =

1978 ECAC Men's ice hockey tournament
- Dates: March 7–11, 1978
- Teams: 8
- Finals site: Boston Garden; Boston, Massachusetts
- Champions: Boston College (2nd title)
- Winning coach: Len Ceglarski (1st title)
- MVP: Joe Mullen (Boston College)
- ECAC Men's Ice Hockey Tournaments

The 1978 ECAC Hockey Men's Ice Hockey Tournament was the 17th tournament in league history. It was played between March 7 and March 11, 1978. Quarterfinal games were played at home team campus sites, while the 'final four' games were played at the Boston Garden in Boston, Massachusetts. By reaching the championship game both, Boston College and Providence received invitations to participate in the 1978 NCAA Division I Men's Ice Hockey Tournament.

== Format ==
The tournament featured three rounds of play, all of which were single-elimination. The top eight teams, based on winning percentage, qualified to participate in the tournament. In the quarterfinals the first seed and eighth seed, the second seed and seventh seed, the third seed and sixth seed and the fourth seed and fifth seed played against one another. In the semifinals, the highest seed plays the lowest remaining seed while the two remaining teams play with the winners advancing to the championship game and the losers advancing to the third place game.

== Conference standings ==
Note: GP = Games played; W = Wins; L = Losses; T = Ties; Pct. = Winning percentage; GF = Goals for; GA = Goals against

1977–78 ECAC Hockey standings
	Conference							Overall					
	GP	W	L	T	Pct.	GF	GA	GP	W	L	T	GF	GA
Boston University†	22	21	1	0	.955	135	85	32	30	2	0	199	126
Cornell	22	16	5	1	.750	161	79	27	20	6	1	195	100
Clarkson	23	16	7	0	.696	139	109	30	19	11	0	174	145
Rensselaer	21	13	8	0	.619	100	83	29	19	9	1	162	117
Boston College*	23	14	9	0	.609	117	116	34	24	10	0	186	147
Brown	23	13	9	1	.587	101	78	29	14	14	1	117	102
Providence	23	12	9	2	.565	116	95	34	17	15	2	172	146
New Hampshire	25	14	11	0	.560	154	124	30	18	12	0	197	150
Yale	26	12	13	1	.481	92	114	26	12	13	1	92	114
Harvard	23	10	13	0	.435	87	112	26	12	14	0	99	122
Dartmouth	23	9	14	0	.391	97	114	26	11	15	0	107	129
Vermont	23	9	14	0	.391	94	108	31	15	16	0	139	137
St. Lawrence	22	8	14	0	.364	91	124	30	12	18	0	124	152
Princeton	21	7	13	1	.357	83	89	25	9	14	2	102	102
Northeastern	24	7	16	1	.313	131	128	28	10	17	1	155	142
Pennsylvania	21	5	14	2	.286	82	123	26	7	17	2	98	145
Colgate	25	4	20	1	.180	81	180	28	5	22	1	91	187
Championship: Boston College † indicates conference regular season champion * indicates conference tournament champion

== Bracket ==
Teams are reseeded after the first round

Quarterfinals; March 7
1	Boston University	6*
8	New Hampshire	5
2	Cornell	5
7	Providence	8
3	Clarkson	2
6	Brown	6
4	Rensselaer	6
5	Boston College	7*

Semifinals; March 10
1	Boston University	1
7	Providence	5
5	Boston College	6
6	Brown	4

Championship; March 11
5	Boston College	4
7	Providence	2
Third Place
1	Boston University	8
6	Brown	4

Note: * denotes overtime period(s)

=== Quarterfinals ===
==== (1) Boston University vs. (8) New Hampshire ====
March 7	Boston University	6 – 5	OT	New Hampshire	Walter Brown Arena

==== (2) Cornell vs. (7) Providence ====
March 7	Cornell	8 – 5	Providence	Lynah Rink

==== (3) Clarkson vs. (6) Brown ====
March 7	Clarkson	2 – 6	Brown	Walker Arena

==== (4) Rensselaer vs. (5) Boston College ====
March 7	Rensselaer	6 – 7	OT	Boston College	Houston Field House

=== Semifinals ===
==== (1) Boston University vs. (7) Providence ====
March 10	Boston University	1 – 5	Providence	Boston Garden

==== (5) Boston College vs. (6) Brown ====
March 10	Boston College	6 – 4	Brown	Boston Garden

=== Third Place ===
==== (1) Boston University vs. (6) Brown ====
March 11	Boston University	8 – 4	Brown	Boston Garden

=== Championship ===
==== (5) Boston College vs. (7) Providence ====
March 11	Boston College	4 – 2	Providence	Boston Garden

== Tournament awards ==
=== All-Tournament Team ===
None

=== MOP ===
- Joe Mullen (Boston College)
