= 1987 NCAA Division III men's ice hockey tournament =

- Teams: 8
- Finals site: Ronald B. Stafford Ice Arena, Plattsburgh, New York
- Champions: Plattsburgh State Cardinals (vacated title)
- Runner-up: Oswego State Lakers (1st title game)
- Semifinalists: Bemidji State Beavers (3rd Frozen Four); St. Cloud State Huskies (1st Frozen Four)
- Winning coach: Steve Hoar (vacated title)
- MOP: Chris Panek (vacated)
- Attendance: 17,530

The 1987 NCAA Division III Men's Ice Hockey Tournament was the culmination of the 1986–87 season, the 4th such tournament in NCAA history. It concluded with Plattsburgh State defeating Oswego State 8–3. All Quarterfinals matchups were held at home team venues, while all succeeding games were played in Plattsburgh, New York.

Plattsburgh State's tournament performance and national championship were later vacated due to NCAA violations.

== Qualifying teams ==
The following teams qualified for the tournament. There were no automatic bids, however, conference tournament champions were given preferential consideration. No formal seeding was used while quarterfinal matches were arranged so that the road teams would have the shortest possible travel distances.

East						West					
School	Conference	Record	Berth Type	Appearance	Last Bid	School	Conference	Record	Berth Type	Appearance	Last Bid
Babson	ECAC East	19–7–1	At-Large	4th	1986	Bemidji State	NCHA	20–10–1	At-Large	3rd	1986
Norwich	ECAC East	15–11–1	At-Large	1st	Never	Concordia (MN)	MIAC	17–12–1	Tournament Champion	1st	Never
Oswego State	ECAC West	22–10–0	At-Large	2nd	1984	St. Cloud State	NCHA	23–8–1	Tournament Champion	1st	Never
Plattsburgh State	ECAC West	30–5–0	Tournament Champion	(vacated)	1986						
Salem State	ECAC East	21–10–1	At-Large	2nd	1985						

== Format ==
The tournament featured three rounds of play. In the Quarterfinals, teams played a two-game series to determine which school advanced to the Semifinals, with tied series decided by a 20-minute mini-game. Mini-game scores are in italics. Beginning with the Semifinals all games became Single-game eliminations. The winning teams in the semifinals advanced to the National Championship Game with the losers playing in a Third Place game. The teams were seeded according to geographic proximity in the quarterfinals so the visiting team would have the shortest feasible distance to travel.

== Bracket ==
Quarterfinals; March 13–15
Plattsburgh State	6	3	2*
Norwich	2	4	1
Bemidji State	3	8	-
Concordia (MN)	1	6	-
Oswego State	3	1	1
Babson	2	2	0
Salem State	8	2	1
St. Cloud State	4	3*	2

Semifinals; March 20
Plattsburgh State	7
Bemidji State	4
Oswego State	5
St. Cloud State	2

National Championship; March 21
Plattsburgh State	8
Oswego State	3
Third Place Game
Bemidji State	4
St. Cloud State	6

Note: * denotes overtime period(s)
Note: Mini-games in italics

== All-Tournament Team ==
- G: Craig Barnett (Plattsburgh State-vacated)
- D: Chris Panek (Plattsburgh State-vacated)
- D: Peter Wasserman (Oswego State)
- F: Joey Ferras (Plattsburgh State-vacated)
- F: Dave Piromalli (Plattsburgh State-vacated)
- F: Rian Reed (St. Cloud State)

* Most Outstanding Player(s)

== Record by conference ==
Conference	# of Bids	Record	Win %	Frozen Four	Championship Game	Champions
ECAC East	3	3–3	.500	-	-	-
NCHA	2	4–4	.500	2	-	-
ECAC West	1	2–2	.500	1	1	-
MIAC	1	0–2	.000	-	-	-

Plattsburgh State's record not included
