= Walt Kyle =

American ice hockey coach

- Born: June 11, 1956 (age 70) Waterloo, Iowa, U.S.
- Height: 5 ft 9 in (175 cm)
- Weight: 179 lb (81 kg; 12 st 11 lb)
- Position: Center
- Played for: NCAA; Boston College Eagles; Northern Michigan Wildcats
- WHA draft: 206th overall, 1974; Vancouver Blazers
- Playing career: 1976–1981

Walt Kyle
Biographical details
- Education: Boston College; Northern Michigan University

Playing career
- 1973-1974: Waterloo Black Hawks
- 1974-1976: Austin Mavericks
- 1976-1978: Boston College
- 1978-1979: Waterloo Black Hawks
- 1979-1981: Northern Michigan
- Position: Center

Coaching career (HC unless noted)
- 1981-1982: Northern Michigan (graduate assistant)
- 1982-1992: Northern Michigan (assistant)
- 1991: USA U20 Team (assistant)
- 1992-1993: USA U20 Team
- 1992-1994: Seattle Thunderbirds
- 1993: Team USA (assistant)
- 1994-1995: San Diego Gulls
- 1995-1996: Baltimore Bandits
- 1996-1998: Mighty Ducks of Anaheim (assistant)
- 1998-2000: Hamilton Bulldogs
- 2000-2002: New York Rangers (assistant)
- 2001: Team USA (assistant)
- 2002-2017: Northern Michigan
- 2006: USA U20 Team

Head coaching record
- Overall: 265–263–68 (.502) (college)
- Tournaments: 0–1 (.000)

Walt Kyle (born June 11, 1956) is an American ice hockey coach. He is the former head coach of the Northern Michigan Wildcats, a position he held from June 2002 to March 2017.

== Career ==
Kyle started his college career with Boston College, spending two seasons with the program before leaving after the Eagles lost the 1978 title game. He spent a year in the USHL while transferring to Northern Michigan and once he got back into the college ranks he found himself a runner-up for a second time in 1980.

After finishing his eligibility in 1981 Kyle turned to coaching with his alma mater first as a graduate assistant and then a full-time assistant. In the early 1990s Kyle started working as a coach for USA Hockey as both an assistant and head coach for the World Junior Team. While coaching the national program Kyle left his position at Northern Michigan to become a head coach, first for the Seattle Thunderbirds in 1992. Kyle was an assistant coach, under Ron Wilson, for Team USA at the 1994 Men's World Ice Hockey Championships held in Bolzano, Italy. By the late '90s Kyle worked his way up to the NHL as an assistant with both the Mighty Ducks of Anaheim and New York Rangers sandwiched around a short stint with the Hamilton Bulldogs.

In 2002 Rick Comley, the only coach the program at Northern Michigan ever had, left the university. A few months later Walt Kyle returned to Marquette, Michigan to become the second head coach for the team. Kyle's early results with the Wildcats were good, winning 20+ games in each of his first four seasons, but over the course of his 15-year tenure the club slowly declined both in the standings and in relevance. Kyle was never able to win either a conference or tournament title in his time behind the bench and only made one NCAA tournament appearance in 2010.

Towards the end of his time with Northern Michigan Kyle got into trouble off the ice. He was put on administrative leave in January 2015 and just over two years later he was arrested on fraud charges. While prosecutors ultimately dismissed the charges the rumors surrounding the charge contributed to his firing at the end of the 2017 season.

== Head coaching record ==
=== College ===
Record table
Season	Team	Overall	Conference	Standing	Postseason
Northern Michigan Wildcats (CCHA) (2002–2013)
2002–03	Northern Michigan	22–17–2	14–13–1	t-5th	CCHA third-place game (win)
2003–04	Northern Michigan	21–16–4	13–13–2	7th	CCHA third-place game (loss)
2004–05	Northern Michigan	22–11–7	17–7–4	3rd	CCHA Quarterfinals
2005–06	Northern Michigan	22–16–2	14–12–2	t-4th	CCHA third-place game (loss)
2006–07	Northern Michigan	15–24–2	10–17–1	10th	CCHA Quarterfinals
2007–08	Northern Michigan	20–20–4	12–13–3	6th	CCHA third-place game (win)
2008–09	Northern Michigan	19–17–5	11–12–5–3	6th	CCHA third-place game (win)
2009–10	Northern Michigan	20–13–8	13–9–6–3	4th	NCAA West regional semifinals
2010–11	Northern Michigan	15–19–5	12–13–3–0	6th	CCHA first round
2011–12	Northern Michigan	17–14–6	11–11–6–3	6th	CCHA first round
2012–13	Northern Michigan	15–19–4	9–15–4–1	10th	CCHA first round
Northern Michigan:		208–186–49	136–135–37		
Northern Michigan Wildcats (WCHA) (2013–2017)
2013–14	Northern Michigan	15–21–2	13–14–1	7th	WCHA first round
2014–15	Northern Michigan	14–18–6	11–13–4	7th	WCHA first round
2015–16	Northern Michigan	15–16–7	12–11–5	5th	WCHA first round
2016–17	Northern Michigan	13–22–4	10–15–3–1	8th	WCHA first round
Northern Michigan:		57–77–19	46–53–13		
Total:		265–263–68			
National champion Postseason invitational champion Conference regular season champion Conference regular season and conference tournament champion Division regular season champion Division regular season and conference tournament champion Conference tournament champion
