= 1986–87 NCAA Division III men's ice hockey season =

- Duration: November 1986– March 21, 1987
- NCAA tournament: 1987
- National championship: Murray Athletic Center; Elmira, New York
- NCAA champion: Vacated

The 1986–87 NCAA Division III men's ice hockey season began in November 1986 and concluded on March 21 of the following year. This was the 14th season of Division III college ice hockey.

In 1990 the NCAA ruled that Plattsburgh State had violated regulations by allowing some of their players to reside in houses owned by people invested in the ice hockey program and were provided with some measure of benefits including free housing, free meals and cash loans. Because these violations occurred between 1985 and 1988 Plattsburgh State's participation in all NCAA games during that time was vacated. As a result there is no NCAA champion for the 1987 season in Division III ice hockey. This is the only NCAA ice hockey championship to be rescinded (as of 2019).

== Regular season ==
=== Season tournaments ===
Tournament	Dates	Teams	Champion
Cardinal Classic	November 7–8	4	Merrimack
RIT Tournament	November 7–8	4	RIT
Westfield State Tournament	November 8–9	4	Geneseo State
Elmira Tournament	November 21–22	4	Oswego State
Merrimack Thanksgiving Tournament	November 22–23	4	Merrimack
Rensselaer Holiday Tournament	November 28–29	4	Ferris State
McCabe Tournament	December 5–6	4	Trinity
Syracuse Invitational	December 26–27	4	Bowling Green
Codfish Bowl	December 27–28	4	Bowdoin
Blue–Gold Tournament	January 9–10	4	Plattsburgh State
Spurrier Invitational	January 16–17	4	Alabama–Huntsville
SUNYAC Tournament	February 21–22	4	Plattsburgh State

=== Standings ===
1986–87 ECAC East standings
	Conference							Overall					
	GP	W	L	T	Pct.	GF	GA	GP	W	L	T	GF	GA
Merrimack †*	24	22	2	0	.917	155	51	36	29	7	0	206	86
Bowdoin	21	19	3	0	.864	103	60	26	21	5	0		
Babson	21	15	6	0	.714	93	61	29	20	8	1	121	79
Salem State	27	17	9	1	.648	130	88	34	22	11	1		
Norwich	20	12	8	0	.600	95	61	29	16	12	1	127	98
Connecticut	21	10	9	2	.524	104	113	29	11	16	2	149	167
Saint Anselm	25	13	12	0	.520	88	87	29	14	15	0	106	101
Holy Cross	26	13	13	0	.500	103	112	36	17	18	1	146	151
Colby	23	10	13	0	.435	86	91						
Massachusetts–Boston	22	8	12	2	.409	104	108	28	13	13	2	154	128
North Adams State	26	10	16	0	.385	104	122	29	13	16	0		
Williams	18	6	11	1	.361	67	84	20	6	12	2		
New England College	22	6	15	1	.295	73	105	23	7	15	1		
American International	25	5	18	2	.240			30	9	19	2		
Middlebury	18	3	14	1	.194	62	102	23	7	15	1	84	121
Westfield State	14	0	14	0	.000	28	121	21	2	19	0		
Championship: March 7, 1987 † indicates conference regular season champion * indicates conference tournament champion

1986–87 ECAC North/South standings
	Conference							Overall					
	GP	W	L	T	Pct.	GF	GA	GP	W	L	T	GF	GA
North Division
Southeastern Massachusetts †~	19	16	2	1	.868	139	36	25	20	4	1		
Framingham State	22	18	4	0	.818	156	102	30	21	9	0		
Fitchburg State	19	15	4	0	.789	139	72	28	19	9	0		
Curry	28	21	7	0	.750	179	94	34	24	10	0		
New Hampshire College	23	13	8	2	.609	123	104	26	13	11	2		
Hawthorne	20	11	9	0	.550	106	100						
Tufts	20	11	9	0	.550	101	98	22	13	9	0		
Plymouth State	22	12	10	0	.545	105	92	22	12	10	0		
Assumption	18	8	9	1	.472	108	84	23	9	13	1		
Saint Michael's	17	8	9	0	.471	71	71	21	8	13	0	96	102
Suffolk	9	3	6	0	.333	43	65	24	9	15	0		
Worcester State	16	5	11	0	.313	73	126	25	8	17	0		
Nichols	16	5	11	0	.313	59	104	24	6	18	0	90	188
Stonehill	20	4	15	1	.225	73	11	24	7	17	0		
Southern Maine	14	2	12	0	.143	53	98	15	4	11	0	65	98
South Division
Trinity †~*	17	17	0	0	1.000	136	25	25	24	1	0	189	57
Quinnipiac	24	19	4	1	.813	161	89	30	22	7	1	192	126
Connecticut College	16	13	3	0	.813	103	45	22	17	5	0	138	74
Wesleyan	18	12	5	1	.694	90	69	24	14	8	2	111	98
Iona	19	13	6	0	.684	117	74	23	15	8	0		
Roger Williams	16	8	7	1	.531	96	82						
Bentley	20	9	11	0	.450	92	104	22	9	13	0	98	129
St. John's	16	7	9	0	.438	66	79						
Western New England	16	5	10	1	.344	77	107	19	6	12	1		
Amherst	15	5	10	0	.333	64	84	23	7	16	0		
Fairfield	21	7	14	0	.333	93	128	24	7	17	0		
Skidmore	21	6	14	1	.310	94	121	23	6	16	1		
Villanova	16	4	12	0	.250	81	118						
Upsala	16	1	14	1	.094	64	117						
Scranton	10	0	10	0	.000	22	134	20	4	16	0		
Championship: March 7, 1987 † indicates division regular season champions ~ indicates division tournament champions * indicates conference tournament champion

1986–87 ECAC West standings
	Conference							Overall					
	GP	W	L	T	Pct.	GF	GA	GP	W	L	T	GF	GA
Plattsburgh State †*	24	23	1	0	.958	162	72	39	33	6	0	243	148
Hamilton	20	15	5	0	.750	109	56	25	18	7	0		
Oswego State	29	20	9	0	.690	167	115	36	24	12	0	190	141
RIT	19	13	6	0	.684	84	62	28	16	12	0	111	100
Elmira	22	14	8	0	.636	112	61	24	15	9	0	118	67
Canisius	22	13	9	0	.591	111	104						
Geneseo State	29	16	13	0	.552	132	124	36	19	17	0		
Union	21	9	12	0	.429	89	107	24	9	15	0		
Potsdam State	26	11	15	0	.423	115	130	28	11	17	0		
Brockport State	22	8	13	1	.386	89	118	25	10	14	1	116	134
Hobart	20	7	13	0	.350	69	99	23	8	15	0	80	118
St. Bonaventure	9	2	7	0	.222	39	50	30	19	11	0		
Cortland State	16	2	14	0	.125	61	100						
Buffalo	22	2	19	1	.114	75	136	25	5	19	1		
Championship: March 7, 1987 † indicates conference regular season champion * indicates conference tournament champion

1986–87 NCAA Division III Independent ice hockey standings
	Overall record					
	GP	W	L	T	GF	GA
Canisius	32	21	11	0	177	157
Lawrence	4	0	4	0		

1986–87 Minnesota Intercollegiate Athletic Conference ice hockey standings
	Conference							Overall					
	GP	W	L	T	Pts	GF	GA	GP	W	L	T	GF	GA
Concordia (MN) †*	16	12	4	0	24	86	67	32	17	14	1	153	155
Saint Mary's	16	11	5	0	22	87	64	29	19	10	0	160	119
St. Thomas	16	10	6	0	20	75	57	29	16	13	0	134	117
Saint John's	16	9	7	0	18	78	68	28	12	15	1	126	135
Bethel	16	8	8	0	16	65	60	26	12	13	1	92	104
Hamline	16	8	8	0	16	69	64	26	9	17	0	99	125
Augsburg	16	6	10	0	12	61	75	27	8	18	1	104	140
Gustavus Adolphus	16	6	10	0	12	76	86	27	9	18	0	110	153
St. Olaf	16	2	14	0	4	48	104	27	5	22	0	79	193
Championship: March 7, 1987 † indicates conference regular season champion * indicates conference tournament champion

1986–87 Northern Collegiate Hockey Association standings
	Conference							Overall					
	GP	W	L	T	Pts	GF	GA	GP	W	L	T	GF	GA
Wisconsin–River Falls	20	15	5	0	30	111	62	30	21	8	1	180	93
St. Cloud State †*	20	13	6	1	27	98	74	35	25	10	1	198	143
Mankato State †	20	13	6	1	27	86	72	32	21	10	1	159	104
Bemidji State	20	12	7	1	25	85	75	35	22	12	1	174	136
Wisconsin–Stevens Point	20	9	11	0	18			28	16	12	0		
Wisconsin–Superior	20	7	13	0	14	77	112	27	12	15	0	120	127
St. Scholastica	20	5	14	1	11	81	124	30	9	20	1	123	168
Wisconsin–Eau Claire	20	4	16	0	8	63	107	28	9	19	0	113	135
Championship: March 8, 1987 † indicates conference regular season champion * indicates conference tournament champion

Note: Mini-game are not included in final standings

== 1987 NCAA Tournament ==
Quarterfinals; March 13–15
Plattsburgh State †	6	3	2*
Norwich	2	4	1
Bemidji State	3	8	-
Concordia	1	6	-
Oswego State	3	1	1
Babson	2	2	0
Salem State	8	2	1
St. Cloud State	4	3*	2

Semifinals; March 20
Plattsburgh State †	7
Bemidji State	4
Oswego State	5
St. Cloud State	2

National championship March 21
Plattsburgh State †	8
Oswego State	3
Third-place game
Bemidji State	4
St. Cloud State	6

Note: * denotes overtime period(s)
Note: † Plattsburgh State's participation in the tournament was later vacated by the NCAA

== Drafted players ==
Round	Pick	Player	College	Conference	NHL team
4	77	Matt DelGuidice	Saint Anselm	ECAC East	Boston Bruins
7	135	Tim Hanus ^{†}	St. Cloud State	NCHA	Quebec Nordiques
7	143	Robert Kelley ^{†}	Norwich	ECAC East	Montreal Canadiens
8	148	Sean Dooley ^{†}	Merrimack	ECAC East	Buffalo Sabres
8	160	Jeff Saterdalen ^{†}	St. Cloud State	NCHA	New York Islanders
9	178	Eric Burrill ^{†}	Mankato State	NCHA	New York Rangers
10	208	Bill Sedergren ^{†}	Union	ECAC West	Calgary Flames
12	238	Alex Weinrich ^{†}	Merrimack	ECAC East	Toronto Maple Leafs
12	240	Dan Brettschneider ^{†}	St. Cloud State	NCHA	Washington Capitals

† incoming freshman

== See also ==
- 1986–87 NCAA Division I men's ice hockey season
