= Brian Stankiewicz =

Austrian ice hockey player

Personal information
- Nationality: Austrian
- Born: 20 June 1956 (age 68); Toronto, Ontario, Canada

Sport
- Sport: Ice hockey

Brian Stankiewicz (born 20 June 1956) is an Austrian ice hockey player. He competed in the men's tournaments at the 1988 Winter Olympics and the 1994 Winter Olympics.
