= 1989–90 Wisconsin Badgers men's ice hockey season =

American college ice hockey season

1989-90 Wisconsin Badgers men's ice hockey season

National champion Badger Showdown, champion WCHA, champion WCHA tournament, champion NCAA tournament, champion
- Conference: 1st WCHA
- Home ice: Dane County Coliseum

Record
- Overall: 36–9–1
- Conference: 19–8–1
- Home: 20–3–1
- Road: 10–6–0
- Neutral: 6–0–0

Coaches and captains
- Head coach: Jeff Sauer
- Assistant coaches: Mike Kemp; Peter Johnson; Bill Howard; Ian Perrin
- Captain: Steve Rohlik
- Alternate captain(s): Mark Osiecki; John Byce; Gary Shuchuk

The 1989–90 Wisconsin Badgers men's ice hockey team represented the University of Wisconsin–Madison in college ice hockey. In its eighth year under head coach Jeff Sauer, the team compiled a 36–9–1 record. The Badgers won the 1990 national championship, their fifth national title.

== Season ==
=== Fast start ===
Wisconsin fielded an experienced team for the 1989–90 season. Led by team captain Steve Rohlik and fellow seniors Chris Tancill, Gary Shuchuk and John Byce, The Badgers got off to a quick start. After having to come from behind to win their first two games, Wisconsin put an exclamation point on their third win (8–2 over Michigan Tech). In a pattern that would follow throughout the season, the eight Badgers goals came from seven different players, illustrating the depth of their offense. Wisconsin suffered its first loss in early November at the hands of Minnesota which began a cycle of split weekends against WCHA teams.

=== Up and down play ===
In five consecutive weekends against conference opponents Wisconsin ended with a .500 record. They did this against both the good (North Dakota, Northern Michigan) and bad (Colorado College, Minnesota–Duluth) and lost the lead their fast start had provided them. During the stretch starting goaltender Duane Derksen hadn't played particularly well and was replaced after surrendering 11 goals to Northern Michigan. Freshman backup Jon Michelizzi, who had won his first two starts against weak, non-conference teams, backstopped the Badgers when they salvaged the weekend against the Wildcats but, after Michelizzi allowed 9 to dreadful Duluth the following weekend, Derksen was back between the pipes. Derksen remained the starter for the remainder of the season with Michelizzi only playing against weak teams or in cleanup duty.

=== Badger showdown ===
When Wisconsin hit the winter break they had slipped back to the pack and were in a tie with Minnesota for the conference lead. The Badgers attempted to get back on track with their holiday tournament, defeating Notre Dame and eventual Hockey East champion Boston College convincingly but once their conference schedule restarted they continued to split weekends. To make matters worse they lost to St. Cloud State, a team that been in Division III three years prior, between the weekend series and last back-to-back games for the first time all season.

=== Strong finish ===
After the second loss to Northern Michigan, Wisconsin started the rematch with a vengeance, scoring 5 times in the first period en route to a 10–1 victory. The shellacking by the Badgers kicked off a run of 9 straight victories for Wisconsin (though they were mostly against the dregs of the conference) and ended on the penultimate weekend of the regular season. After splitting their second weekend against Minnesota, Wisconsin sat just 2 points ahead of the Golden Gophers and 4 above North Dakota who they hosted in the final weekend. A tie in the first game eliminated the Fighting Sioux from contention, but with the Gophers winning their first game Wisconsin's lead was down to just one point. With both teams watching the scoreboard, Wisconsin won their game in overtime while Minnesota was soundly beaten 3–8. The win sealed only the second MacNaughton Cup for the Badgers and first since 1977.

=== WCHA tournament ===
Wisconsin opened the conference tournament against Michigan Tech and gout a tougher fight than they were expecting from the bottom-feeders. After Wisconsin won the first game MTU built a 3–0 lead in the rematch and just as it looked like the series was heading for a third game the Badgers rallied with three of their own in the final 24 minutes and potted the game-winner in overtime. While the Badgers may have been able to get away with taking the Huskies lightly, once the tournament shifted to Saint Paul they couldn't dismiss defending conference champion Northern Michigan as easily. After scoring the first goal Wisconsin had to watch the Wildcats get the next three. Wisconsin once again rallied to tie the game at 3-all and head into overtime with a championship berth in the balance. For the second consecutive game the Badgers netted an overtime goal, bring their extra-session record up to 5–0–1 for the season.

After two nail-biting games, Wisconsin gave their fans a break in the championship, scoring the first four goals and ultimately defeating Minnesota 7–1. Wisconsin's sixth conference championship (2nd Broadmoor Trophy) earned them the WCHA's automatic bid to the NCAA tournament, their third consecutive appearance.

=== NCAA tournament ===
Wisconsin received the 2nd western seed, earning themselves a bye into the quarterfinals and home ice for their series. After a week off the Badgers welcomed Maine to Madison with a 7–3 win in their first game. Wisconsin scored the first five goals of the game and ended the match before the Black Bears could get their skates under them. The rematch the following night followed a familiar pattern; after scoring first Wisconsin saw Maine score three consecutive power play goals and led 3–1 just past the midway point of the game. The Badgers scratched and clawed their way back to a tie in the third period and were very careful not to take anymore penalties against the dangerous Black Bears. Tom Sagissor scored the overtime goal in the fifth minute of overtime to send Maine packing and give Wisconsin a ticket to the Frozen Four.

In Detroit the Badgers faced down the top eastern seed, Boston College. In what was probably Derksen's best performance of the season, Wisconsin held BC to a single goal in the game, allowing Chris Tancill's two power play goals to stand up and send the Badgers to the title game with a 2–1 win.

==== Championship ====
In the final, Wisconsin faced a surprising Colgate squad who had ridden the strong play of goaltender Dave Gagnon to 31 wins entering the championship. Wisconsin hoped their offense would provide them with the edge but the Badgers had a built-in advantage over the Red Raiders; Wisconsin routinely played games in front of large crowds. When the game started 15,000 spectators, more than half of whom wore Wisconsin colors, began cheering. Colgate, a team from a small upstate New York school whose total enrollment could have fit inside Wisconsin's home arena more than twice over, got lost in the lights. The Raiders took a penalty almost immediately after puck drop and John Byce scored at the 90-second mark. When Colgate got the opportunity to tie the game with their own power play a short time later Wisconsin stole the puck in their own zone and Rob Mendel sent the puck to a streaking Byce who skated in on Gagnon and slipped the puck between his pads for his second goal of the game.

Colgate, who was not built for high-scoring games, had to fight furiously to recover after the disastrous start. They were able to cut the lead in half before the five-minute mark but in their zeal to tie the game they took several bad penalties and the WCHA's best power play made them pay; Wisconsin scored twice more in the first on the man-advantage and built a seemingly insurmountable lead for the low-scoring Red Raiders. All the power play time harmed Colgate, in addition to goals, by keeping them away from the Wisconsin net and not allowing them to generate any kind of pressure on Derksen. Colgate could only manage 5 shots in each of the first two periods but was able to score twice. A fourth power play goal by Badgers in the second period all but ended the game and as the third progressed Wisconsin knew they were going to win the national title. Even after Colgate's third goal there was little hope for the underdogs and Jeff Sauer was confident enough to give Michelizzi a turn in net once Byce finished off his hat-trick with an empty-net goal.

=== Awards and honors ===
While Byce's three goal game in the championship was impressive it was Chris Tancill who received the Tournament MOP. Wisconsin's dominating performance in the championship was typified by having 5 players find their way on the All-Tournament Team; Tancill was joined by Duane Derksen, Rob Andringa, Mark Osiecki and John Byce. The Badgers had three players finish in the top 10 in scoring in the nation but only Gary Shuchuk made the All-American West Team. Shuchuk was also named the WCHA Most Valuable Player and named to the All-WCHA First Team. while Derksen, Byce and Sean Hill made the second team.

== Standings ==
1989–90 Western Collegiate Hockey Association standings
| | Conference | | | | | | | Overall | | | | | |
| | GP | W | L | T | PTS | GF | GA | GP | W | L | T | GF | GA |
|---|---|---|---|---|---|---|---|---|---|---|---|---|---|
| Wisconsin†* | 28 | 19 | 8 | 1 | 39 | 147 | 111 | 46 | 36 | 9 | 1 | 254 | 166 |
| Minnesota | 28 | 17 | 9 | 2 | 36 | 147 | 124 | 46 | 28 | 16 | 2 | 227 | 189 |
| North Dakota | 28 | 15 | 10 | 3 | 33 | 149 | 114 | 45 | 28 | 13 | 4 | 252 | 175 |
| Northern Michigan | 28 | 15 | 12 | 1 | 31 | 130 | 129 | 42 | 22 | 19 | 1 | 191 | 191 |
| Denver | 28 | 13 | 15 | 0 | 26 | 130 | 139 | 42 | 18 | 24 | 0 | 183 | 201 |
| Minnesota-Duluth | 28 | 13 | 15 | 0 | 26 | 114 | 112 | 40 | 20 | 19 | 1 | 170 | 152 |
| Colorado College | 28 | 10 | 17 | 1 | 21 | 97 | 129 | 40 | 18 | 20 | 2 | 152 | 174 |
| Michigan Tech | 28 | 6 | 22 | 0 | 12 | 112 | 168 | 40 | 10 | 30 | 0 | 150 | 218 |
Championship: Wisconsin † indicates conference regular season champion * indicates conference tournament champion

== Schedule ==
| Date | Opponent^{#} | Rank^{#} | Site | Decision | Result | Attendance | Record |
Regular season
| October 16 | vs. St. Cloud State | | Dane County Coliseum • Madison, Wisconsin | Derksen | W 4–3 | 8,105 | 1–0 |
| October 20 | vs. Michigan Tech | | Dane County Coliseum • Madison, Wisconsin | Derksen | W 6–5 | 8,508 | 2–0 (1–0) |
| October 21 | vs. Michigan Tech | | Dane County Coliseum • Madison, Wisconsin | Derksen | W 8–2 | 8,610 | 3–0 (2–0) |
| October 27 | at Denver | | DU Arena • Denver, Colorado | Derksen | W 6–5 | 4,148 | 4–0 (3–0) |
| October 28 | at Denver | | DU Arena • Denver, Colorado | Derksen | W 4–2 | 3,722 | 5–0 (4–0) |
| November 3 | vs. Minnesota | | Dane County Coliseum • Madison, Wisconsin | Derksen | L 3–5 | 8,644 | 5–1 (4–1) |
| November 4 | vs. Minnesota | | Dane County Coliseum • Madison, Wisconsin | Derksen | W 4–3 | 8,644 | 6–1 (5–1) |
| November 10 | vs. New Hampshire* | | Dane County Coliseum • Madison, Wisconsin | Michelizzi | W 8–1 | 8,644 | 7–1 (5–1) |
| November 11 | vs. New Hampshire* | | Dane County Coliseum • Madison, Wisconsin | Derksen | W 7–3 | 8,644 | 8–1 (5–1) |
| November 14 | at Illinois–Chicago* | | UIC Pavilion • Chicago, Illinois | Michelizzi | W 9–5 | 2,072 | 9–1 (5–1) |
| November 17 | at Northern Michigan | | Lakeview Arena • Marquette, Michigan | Derksen | L 5–11 | 2,940 | 9–2 (5–2) |
| November 18 | at Northern Michigan | | Lakeview Arena • Marquette, Michigan | Michelizzi | W 6–5 ^{OT} | 3,277 | 10–2 (6–2) |
| November 24 | vs. Minnesota–Duluth | | Dane County Coliseum • Madison, Wisconsin | Michelizzi | L 4–9 | 8,644 | 10–3 (6–3) |
| November 25 | vs. Minnesota–Duluth | | Dane County Coliseum • Madison, Wisconsin | Derksen | W 3–0 | 8,644 | 11–3 (7–3) |
| December 1 | at North Dakota | | Winter Sports Center • Grand Forks, North Dakota | Derksen | W 7–5 | 5,900 | 12–3 (8–3) |
| December 2 | at North Dakota | | Winter Sports Center • Grand Forks, North Dakota | Derksen | L 5–9 | 5,950 | 12–4 (8–4) |
| December 8 | at Colorado College | | Broadmoor World Arena • Colorado Springs, Colorado | Derksen | W 5–0 | 2,774 | 13–4 (9–4) |
| December 9 | at Colorado College | | Broadmoor World Arena • Colorado Springs, Colorado | Derksen | L 5–6 | 3,092 | 13–5 (9–5) |
| December 11 | vs. Sokil Kiev* | | Dane County Coliseum • Madison, Wisconsin (Exhibition) | Derksen | L 2–4 | 7,268 | 13–5 (9–5) |
| December 12 | vs. Alabama–Huntsville* | | Dane County Coliseum • Madison, Wisconsin | Michelizzi | W 5–3 | 8,004 | 14–5 (9–5) |
Badger Showdown
| December 28 | vs. Notre Dame* | | Bradley Center • Milwaukee, Wisconsin (Showdown Semifinal) | Derksen | W 9–5 | 13,330 | 15–5 (9–5) |
| December 29 | vs. Boston College* | | Bradley Center • Milwaukee, Wisconsin (Showdown championship) | Derksen | W 6–3 | 16,674 | 16–5 (9–5) |
| January 2 | vs. Alaska–Anchorage* | | Dane County Coliseum • Madison, Wisconsin | Derksen | W 7–6 ^{OT} | 7,466 | 17–5 (9–5) |
| January 5 | at Minnesota–Duluth | | Duluth Arena Auditorium • Duluth, Minnesota | Derksen | L 3–4 | 5,664 | 17–6 (9–6) |
| January 6 | at Minnesota–Duluth | | Duluth Arena Auditorium • Duluth, Minnesota | Derksen | W 4–2 | 5,664 | 18–6 (10–6) |
| January 9 | at St. Cloud State* | | National Hockey Center • St. Cloud, Minnesota | Derksen | L 5–6 | 3,950 | 18–7 (10–6) |
| January 19 | vs. Northern Michigan | | Dane County Coliseum • Madison, Wisconsin | Derksen | L 3–4 | 8,644 | 18–8 (10–7) |
| January 20 | vs. Northern Michigan | | Dane County Coliseum • Madison, Wisconsin | Derksen | W 10–1 | 8,644 | 19–8 (11–7) |
| January 23 | vs. Illinois–Chicago* | | Dane County Coliseum • Madison, Wisconsin | Michelizzi | W 7–3 | 8,196 | 20–8 (11–7) |
| January 26 | vs. Denver | | Dane County Coliseum • Madison, Wisconsin | Derksen | W 3–2 | 8,544 | 21–8 (12–7) |
| January 27 | vs. Denver | | Dane County Coliseum • Madison, Wisconsin | Derksen | W 7–1 | 8,644 | 22–8 (13–7) |
| February 2 | at Michigan Tech | | MacInnes Student Ice Arena • Houghton, Michigan | Derksen | W 5–4 | 3,599 | 23–8 (14–7) |
| February 3 | at Michigan Tech | | MacInnes Student Ice Arena • Houghton, Michigan | Derksen | W 7–2 | 3,642 | 24–8 (15–7) |
| February 9 | vs. Colorado College | | Dane County Coliseum • Madison, Wisconsin | Derksen | W 7–3 | 8,644 | 25–8 (16–7) |
| February 10 | vs. Colorado College | | Dane County Coliseum • Madison, Wisconsin | Derksen | W 9–5 | 8,444 | 26–8 (17–7) |
| February 16 | at Minnesota | | Williams Arena • Minneapolis, Minnesota | Derksen | W 6–3 | 7,649 | 27–8 (18–7) |
| February 17 | at Minnesota | | Williams Arena • Minneapolis, Minnesota | Derksen | L 2–4 | 7,713 | 27–9 (18–8) |
| February 23 | vs. North Dakota | | Dane County Coliseum • Madison, Wisconsin | Derksen | T 5–5 ^{OT} | 8,644 | 27–9–1 (18–8–1) |
| February 24 | vs. North Dakota | | Dane County Coliseum • Madison, Wisconsin | Derksen | W 5–4 ^{OT} | 8,644 | 28–9–1 (19–8–1) |
WCHA tournament
| March 3 | vs. Michigan Tech* | | Dane County Coliseum • Madison, Wisconsin (WCHA Quarterfinal game 1) | Derksen | W 5–2 | 8,644 | 29–9–1 (19–8–1) |
| March 4 | vs. Michigan Tech* | | Dane County Coliseum • Madison, Wisconsin (WCHA Quarterfinal game 2) | Derksen | W 4–3 ^{OT} | 8,523 | 30–9–1 (19–8–1) |
Wisconsin Won Series 2-0
| March 11 | at Northern Michigan* | | Civic Center • Saint Paul, Minnesota (WCHA Semifinal) | Derksen | W 4–3 ^{OT} | 11,137 | 31–9–1 (19–8–1) |
| March 12 | at Minnesota* | | Civic Center • Saint Paul, Minnesota (WCHA championship) | Derksen | W 7–1 | 13,704 | 32–9–1 (19–8–1) |
NCAA tournament
| March 23 | vs. Maine* | | Dane County Coliseum • Madison, Wisconsin (National Quarterfinal game 1) | Derksen | W 7–3 | 8,644 | 33–9–1 (19–8–1) |
| March 24 | vs. Maine* | | Dane County Coliseum • Madison, Wisconsin (National Quarterfinal game 2) | Derksen | W 4–3 ^{OT} | 5,517 | 34–9–1 (19–8–1) |
Wisconsin Won Series 2-0
| March 30 | vs. Boston College* | | Joe Louis Arena • Detroit, Michigan (National Semifinal) | Derksen | W 2–1 | 14,174 | 35–9–1 (19–8–1) |
| April 1 | vs. Colgate* | | Joe Louis Arena • Detroit, Michigan (National championship) | Derksen | W 7–3 | 15,034 | 36–9–1 (19–8–1) |
*Non-conference game. ^{#}Rankings from USCHO.com Poll. Source:

== Roster and scoring statistics ==
| No. | Name | Year | Position | Hometown | S/P/C | Games | Goals | Assists | Pts | PIM |
|---|---|---|---|---|---|---|---|---|---|---|
| 16 | Gary Shuchuk | Senior | C | Edmonton, AB | (Alberta) | 45 | 41 | 39 | 80 | 70 |
| 22 | Chris Tancill | Senior | RW | Livonia, MI | (Michigan) | 45 | 39 | 32 | 71 | 44 |
| 11 | John Byce | Senior | C/RW | Madison, WI | (Wisconsin) | 46 | 27 | 44 | 71 | 20 |
| 6 | Sean Hill | Sophomore | D | Duluth, MN | (Minnesota) | 42 | 14 | 39 | 53 | 78 |
| 12 | Doug MacDonald | Sophomore | C | Assiniboia, SK | (Saskatchewan) | 44 | 16 | 35 | 51 | 52 |
| 19 | Tom Sagissor | Senior | LW | Hastings, MN | (Minnesota) | 43 | 19 | 28 | 47 | 122 |
| 24 | Mark Osiecki | Junior | D | Saint Paul, MN | (Minnesota) | 46 | 5 | 38 | 43 | 78 |
| 9 | Steve Rohlik | Senior | LW | Saint Paul, MN | (Minnesota) | 46 | 17 | 23 | 40 | 52 |
| 2 | Barry Richter | Freshman | RW/D | Madison, WI | (Wisconsin) | 42 | 13 | 23 | 36 | 26 |
| 21 | Bob Andringa | Junior | D | Madison, WI | (Wisconsin) | 46 | 9 | 23 | 32 | 60 |
| 27 | Dennis Snedden | Junior | LW | Eagle River, WI | (Wisconsin) | 45 | 10 | 17 | 27 | 50 |
| 20 | Don Granato | Junior | LW | Downers Grove, IL | (Illinois) | 45 | 12 | 11 | 23 | 40 |
| 7 | John Parker | Junior | C/RW | White Bear Lake, MN | (Minnesota) | 35 | 11 | 9 | 20 | 22 |
| 25 | Brett Kurtz | Junior | C | Joliet, IL | (Illinois) | 42 | 8 | 12 | 20 | 28 |
| 14 | Joe Decker | Junior | RW | Bloomington, MN | (Minnesota) | 36 | 4 | 10 | 14 | 14 |
| 17 | Rob Mendel | Senior | D | Los Angeles, CA | (California) | 44 | 1 | 13 | 14 | 30 |
| 23 | Rodger Sykes | Junior | D | Waukegan, IL | (Illinois) | 38 | 3 | 5 | 8 | 18 |
| 15 | Tray Tuomie | Junior | C/RW | Saint Paul, MN | (Minnesota) | 20 | 2 | 6 | 8 | 0 |
| 10 | Jon Helgeson | Sophomore | LW | Roseau, MN | (Minnesota) | 18 | 2 | 2 | 4 | 12 |
| 8 | Chris Nelson | Sophomore | D | Los Angeles, CA | (California) | 37 | 1 | 3 | 4 | 38 |
| 29 | Duane Derksen | Sophomore | G | Saint Boniface, MB | (Manitoba) | 41 | 0 | 3 | 3 | 4 |
| 13 | Jason Francisco | Freshman | RW | Duluth, MN | (Minnesota) | 7 | 0 | 1 | 1 | 0 |
| 18 | Noel Rahn | Freshman | C | Edina, MN | (Minnesota) | 1 | 0 | 0 | 0 | 0 |
| 31 | Jon Michelizzi | Freshman | G | Duluth, MN | (Minnesota) | 9 | 0 | 0 | 0 | 0 |
| 4 | Joe Harwell | Sophomore | D | Minneapolis, MN | (Minnesota) | 10 | 0 | 0 | 0 | 2 |
| 26 | Kurt Gonce | Sophomore | C | Creve Coeur, MO | (Missouri) | 0 | - | - | - | - |
| | Bench | | | | | 46 | 0 | 0 | 0 | 10 |
| Total | | | | | | | 254 | 416 | 670 | 872 |

== Goaltending statistics ==
| No. | Name | Games | Minutes | Wins | Losses | Ties | Goals against | Saves | Shut outs | SV % | GAA |
|---|---|---|---|---|---|---|---|---|---|---|---|
| 29 | Duane Derksen | 41 | 2345 | 31 | 8 | 1 | 133 | 1061 | 2 | .889 | 3.40 |
| 31 | Jon Michelizzi | 9 | 427 | 5 | 1 | 0 | 30 | 155 | 0 | .838 | 4.21 |
| | Others | 1 | 7 | 0 | 0 | 0 | 3 | 3 | 0 | .500 | 25.71 |
| Total | | 46 | 2781 | 36 | 9 | 1 | 166 | 1219 | 2 | .880 | 3.58 |

== 1990 national championship game ==
=== (W2) Wisconsin vs. (E2) Colgate ===
| April 1 | Wisconsin | 7 – 3 | Colgate | Joe Louis Arena |

Scoring summary
| Period | Team | Goal | Assist(s) | Time | Score |
|---|---|---|---|---|---|
| 1st | WIS | John Byce – PP | Hill and Andringa | 1:30 | 1–0 WIS |
| 1st | WIS | John Byce – SH | Mendel | 3:23 | 2–0 WIS |
| 1st | CGT | Joel Gardner – PP | Dupere and Spott | 4:58 | 2–1 WIS |
| 1st | WIS | Chris Tancill – PP | Andringa and Hill | 7:33 | 3–1 WIS |
| 1st | WIS | Rob Andringa – PP GW | Hill and MacDonald | 14:53 | 4–1 WIS |
| 2nd | WIS | Dennis Snedden | Kurtz and Osiecki | 25:03 | 5–1 WIS |
| 2nd | CGT | Steve Poapst – PP | Gardner | 29:42 | 5–2 WIS |
| 2nd | WIS | Gary Shuchuk – PP | Richter and Rohlik | 33:09 | 6–2 WIS |
| 3rd | CGT | Jamie Cooke – PP | Woodcroft and Lille | 49:36 | 6–3 WIS |
| 3rd | WIS | John Byce – EN | unassisted | 59:18 | 7–3 WIS |

Shots by period
| Team | 1 | 2 | 3 | OT |
|---|---|---|---|---|
| Colgate | 5 | 5 | 14 | 24 |
| Wisconsin | 10 | 7 | 3 | 20 |

Goaltenders
| Team | Name | Saves | Goals against | Time on ice |
|---|---|---|---|---|
| CGT | Dave Gagnon | 13 | 6 | |
| WIS | Duane Derksen | 21 | 3 | |
| WIS | Jon Michelizzi | 0 | 0 | |

== Players drafted into the NHL ==
=== 1990 NHL entry draft ===
| = NHL All-Star team | = NHL All-Star | = NHL All-Star and NHL All-Star team | = Did not play in the NHL |

| Round | Pick | Player | NHL team |
|---|---|---|---|
| 3 | 48 | Dan Plante† | New York Islanders |
| 4 | 79 | Chris Tucker† | Chicago Blackhawks |
| 8 | 160 | Todd Hedlund† | New York Rangers |
| 12 | 237 | Andrew Shier† | New York Islanders |

† incoming freshman

== See also ==
- 1990 NCAA Division I Men's Ice Hockey Tournament
- List of NCAA Division I Men's Ice Hockey Tournament champions
