= 1990 NCAA Division I men's ice hockey tournament =

- Teams: 12
- Finals site: Joe Louis Arena, Detroit
- Champions: Wisconsin Badgers (5th title)
- Runner-up: Colgate Red Raiders (1st title game)
- Semifinalists: Boston College Eagles (13th Frozen Four); Boston University Terriers (14th Frozen Four)
- Winning coach: Jeff Sauer (2nd title)
- MOP: Chris Tancill (Wisconsin)
- Attendance: 24,569

The 1990 NCAA Division I Men's Ice Hockey Tournament was the culmination of the 1989–90 NCAA Division I men's ice hockey season, the 43rd such tournament in NCAA history. It was held between March 16 and April 1, 1990, and concluded with Wisconsin defeating Colgate 7-3. All First Round and Quarterfinals matchups were held at home team venues with the 'Frozen Four' games being played at the Joe Louis Arena in Detroit, Michigan.

This was the first year in which the consolation game was not played since the tournament's premier in 1948.

Boston University's 30 goals scored during the tournament is the highest ever for a single team. The Terriers also played the most NCAA tournament games in one year (7).

== Qualifying teams ==
The NCAA permitted 12 teams to qualify for the tournament and divided its qualifiers into two regions (East and West). Each of the tournament champions from the four Division I conferences (CCHA, ECAC, Hockey East and WCHA) received automatic invitations into the tournament with At-large bids making up the remaining 8 teams. The NCAA permitted one Independent team to participate in the tournament and placed it in the East Regional with the intent to insert an additional independent in the West Regional the following season. As a result, the two western conferences (CCHA and WCHA) would split four open spots as opposed to the East's three.

East							West						
Seed	School	Conference	Record	Berth type	Appearance	Last bid	Seed	School	Conference	Record	Berth type	Appearance	Last bid
1	Boston College	Hockey East	26–11–1	Tournament champion	17th	1989	1	Michigan State	CCHA	36–5–3	Tournament champion	12th	1989
2	Colgate	ECAC Hockey	28–5–1	Tournament champion	2nd	1981	2	Wisconsin	WCHA	32–9–1	Tournament champion	11th	1989
3	Maine	Hockey East	31–9–2	At-large bid	4th	1989	3	Lake Superior State	CCHA	31–8–3	At-large bid	4th	1989
4	Boston University	Hockey East	21–14–2	At-large bid	16th	1986	4	Minnesota	WCHA	25–14–2	At-large bid	17th	1989
5	Clarkson	ECAC Hockey	21–9–3	At-large bid	10th	1984	5	North Dakota	WCHA	27–11–4	At-large bid	12th	1987
6	Alaska-Anchorage	Independent	21–9–2	At-large bid	1st	Never	6	Bowling Green	CCHA	25–15–2	At-large bid	9th	1989

== Format ==
The tournament featured four rounds of play. The three odd-number ranked teams from one region were placed into a bracket with the three even-number ranked teams of the other region. The teams were then seeded according to their ranking with the top two teams in each bracket receiving byes into the quarterfinals. In the first round the third and sixth seeds and the fourth and fifth seeds played best-of-three series to determine which school advanced to the Quarterfinals with the winners of the 4 vs. 5 series playing the first seed and the winner of the 3 vs. 6 series playing the second seed. In the Quarterfinals the matches were best-of-three series once more with the victors advancing to the National Semifinals. Beginning with the Semifinals all games were played at the Joe Louis Arena and all series became Single-game eliminations. The winning teams in the semifinals advanced to the National Championship Game.

== Tournament Bracket ==
First Round; March 16–18
W4	Minnesota	6	5	–
E5	Clarkson	1	1	–
E3	Maine	8	5	–
W6	Bowling Green	4	2	–
E4	Boston University	5	5	5
W5	North Dakota	8	3	0
W3	Lake Superior State	6	10	–
E6	Alaska-Anchorage	2	3	–

Quarterfinals; March 23–25
E1	Boston College	4	1	6
W4	Minnesota	2	2	1
W2	Wisconsin	7	4*	–
E3	Maine	3	3	–
W1	Michigan State	6	3	3
E4	Boston University	3	5	5
E2	Colgate	3	2	–
W3	Lake Superior State	2	1	–

Frozen Four; March 30
E1	Boston College	1
W2	Wisconsin	2
E4	Boston University	2
E2	Colgate	3

National Championship; April 1
W2	Wisconsin	7
E2	Colgate	3

Note: * denotes overtime period(s)

=== First round ===
==== (E3) Maine vs. (W6) Bowling Green ====
March 16	Maine	8 – 4	Bowling Green	Alfond Arena	Recap
(unassisted) Jim Montgomery - SH - 13:48 (Downey, Carney) Justin Tomberlin - 17:32		First period	14:53 - PP - Joe Quinn (Blake, Jiranek)
(Scremin, Massara) Steve Tepper - 06:25 (Montgomery, Tomberlin) Brian Downey - 07:45 (Murphy, Massara) Jim Burke - GW - 16:02 (Tomberlin, Downey) Jim Montgomery - PP - 17:32		Second period	No scoring
(Pellerin, Roy) Martin Robitaille - 13:04 (Burke) Martin Robitaille - 16:30		Third period	00:29 - PP - Martin Jiranek (Emerson); 05:49 - Martin Jiranek (Holmes, Solly); 15:39 - Kevin Dahl (Harkins, Potvin)
(18 saves / 22 shots) Matt DelGuidice		Goalie stats	Angelo Libertucci (16 saves / 22 shots); Paul Connell (12 saves / 14 shots)

March 17	Maine	5 – 2	Bowling Green	Alfond Arena	Recap
(Robitaille, Downey) Jean-Yves Roy - 07:28		First period	16:08 - Rob Blake (unassisted)
(Robitaille, Pellerin) Keith Carney - 06:51 (Downey, Scremin) Jim Montgomery - PP GW - 11:21 (King) Mike Barkley - SH - 13:44		Second period	09:03 - PP - Peter Holmes (Blake, Emerson)
(Carney) Jean-Yves Roy - EN - 19:28		Third period	No scoring
(1 save / 1 shot) Matt DelGuidice (29 saves / 31 shots) Scott King		Goalie stats	Paul Connell (20 saves / 24 shots)

Maine won series 2–0

==== (E4) Boston University vs. (W5) North Dakota ====
March 16	Boston University	5 – 8	North Dakota	Walter Brown Arena	Recap
(Legault, McEachern) Tony Amonte - PP - 09:11		First period	00:16 - Lee Davidson (Parent); 05:46 - Lee Davidson (Hakstol, Valk); 12:38 - PP - Lee Davidson (Herter, Parent); 19:47 - Justin Duberman (Davidson, Valk)
(unassisted) Petteri Koskimäki - 02:23 (Amonte, McEachern) Joe Sacco - PP - 04:15 (McEachern) Joe Sacco - 07:33		Second period	08:37 - PP - Dixon Ward (Romanluk, G. Johnson); 14:27 - GW - Lee Davidson (Marvin); 15:12 - Ross Johnson (McLean, Herter)
(unassisted) Dave Tomlinson - 15:14		Third period	18:11 - Garry Valk (Davidson, Herter)
(19 saves / 26 shots) Scott Cashman (9 saves / 10 shots) John Bradley		Goalie stats	Tony Couture (19 saves / 24 shots)

March 17	Boston University	5 – 3	North Dakota	Walter Brown Arena	Recap
No scoring		First period	15:00 - Neil Eisenhut (Ward, Bobyck)
(Amonte) Shawn McEachern - 09:35 (McEachern, Ronan) Joe Sacco - 10:10 (von Stefenelli) Alex Legault - PP - 15:34		Second period	17:09 - Dixon Ward (Eisenhut, Pascall)
(unassisted) Tony Amonte - SH GW - 05:42 (Mi. Bavis) Mark Bavis - 10:29		Third period	13:39 - PP - Russ Romaniuk (Ward, Parent)
(26 saves / 29 shots) Scott Cashman		Goalie stats	Chris Dickson (33 saves / 38 shots)

March 18	Boston University	5 – 0	North Dakota	Walter Brown Arena	Recap
(Tomlinson) Tony Amonte - SH GW - 06:07 (McEachern, Ronan) Joe Sacco - 07:48 (Tomlinson, Amonte) Petteri Koskimäki - PP - 10:22		First period	No scoring
No scoring		Second period	No scoring
(Legault, McEachern) Tony Amonte - PP - 06:48 (Koskimäki, Brownschidle) Dave Tomlinson - 19:20		Third period	No scoring
(26 saves / 26 shots) Scott Cashman		Goalie stats	Tony Couture (15 saves / 18 shots); Chris Dickson (13 saves / 15 shots)

Boston University won series 2–1

==== (W3) Lake Superior State vs. (E6) Alaska-Anchorage ====
March 16	Lake Superior State	6 – 2	Alaska-Anchorage	Norris Center	Recap
(Dowd, Stauber) Doug Weight - PP - 05:31 (Jablonski, Dowd) Tim Harris - 10:51		First period	07:35 - PP - Tim Kollman (Kraft, Larson)
(unassisted) Doug Weight - SH GW - 06:57 (Jablonski, Cernich) Dan Keczmer - PP - 07:59		Second period	No scoring
(Weight, Keczmer) Paul Constantin - 17:05 (Johnston) Ken Blum - 17:38		Third period	05:45 - SH - Doug Spooner (Donald, Batters)
(32 saves / 34 shots) Darrin Madeley		Goalie stats	Paul Krake (33 saves / 39 shots)

March 17	Lake Superior State	10 – 3	Alaska-Anchorage	Norris Center	Recap
(Breslin) Pete Stauber - SH - 01:09 (Breslin, Stauber) Sandy Moger - 09:59 (Dowd, Harris) Doug Weight - PP - 12:02 (Jablonski, Bachusz) Sandy Moger - GW - 14:46 (Weight, Breslin) Karl Johnston - 16:35		First period	No scoring
(Dowd, Stauber) Karl Johnston - PP - 08:33 (Smith) Paul Constantin - 09:13 (Dowd) Doug Laprade - 12:43 (Jablonski, Cernich) Dan Keczmer - PP - 14:16		Second period	15:34 - Cary Fisher (Meyhoff, Knauft)
(Dowd) Jeff Jablonski - 04:42		Third period	07:54 - Sean Noble (unassisted); 09:51 - PP - Steve Bogoyevac (Knauft)
(35 saves / 36 shots) Darrin Madeley (8 saves / 10 shots) Brian Lukowski		Goalie stats	Paul Krake (12 saves / 17 shots); Chad Meyhoff (26 saves / 31 shots)

Lake Superior State won series 2–0

==== (W4) Minnesota vs. (E5) Clarkson ====
March 16	Minnesota	6 – 1	Clarkson	Mariucci Arena	Recap
(Klatt, Olimb) Ken Gernander - 06:46 (P. Hankinson) Ken Gernander - PP GW - 13:18		First period	No scoring
(P. Hankinson, Zmolek) Grant Bischoff - 04:00 (Bloom, B. Hankinson) Tom Pederson - PP - 14:51		Second period	09:15 - PP - Scott Thomas (Casselman, D. Tretowicz)
(Miller, Bischoff) Peter Hankinson - 07:34 (P. Hankinson, Johnson) Trent Klatt - PP - 17:25		Third period	No scoring
(25 saves / 26 shots) Tom Newman (3 saves / 3 shots) Scott Nelson		Goalie stats	John Fletcher (23 saves / 28 shots); Chris Rogles (8 saves / 9 shots)

March 17	Minnesota	5 – 1	Clarkson	Mariucci Arena	Recap
No scoring		First period	15:34 - PP - Mikko Tavi (Bélanger, Trombley)
(Bischoff, Olimb) Peter Hankinson - 08:55 (Laylin, Gernander) Trent Klatt - GW - 09:41 (Miller, P. Hankinson) Grant Bischoff - 11:50		Second period	No scoring
(Johnson) John Brill - 13:22 (Laylin, Richards) Trent Klatt - EN - 16:11		Third period	No scoring
(26 saves / 27 shots) Tom Newman		Goalie stats	John Fletcher (34 saves / 38 shots); Chris Rogles (1 save / 1 shot)

Minnesota won series 2–0

=== Quarterfinals ===
==== (E1) Boston College vs. (W4) Minnesota ====
March 23	Boston College	4 – 2	Minnesota	Conte Forum	Recap
(Crowley) Bill Guerin - PP - 02:05 (Guerin, Beran) Dave Franzosa - 13:43		First period	14:58 - PP - Larry Olimb (Gernander)
(Heinze) David Emma - SH GW - 11:00		Second period	12:34 - Grant Bischoff (Zmolek)
(Crowley) Bill Guerin - 04:08		Third period	No scoring
(40 saves / 42 shots) Scott LaGrand		Goalie stats	Tom Newman (25 saves / 29 shots)

March 24	Boston College	1 – 2	Minnesota	Conte Forum	Recap
No scoring		First period	15:27 - PP - Tom Pederson (Olimb, P. Hankinson)
No scoring		Second period	No scoring
(Farley, Rathbone) Jeff O'Neill - 15:02		Third period	19:09 - GW - Brett Strot (Olimb, Miller)
(24 saves / 26 shots) Sandy Galuppo		Goalie stats	Tom Newman (29 saves / 30 shots)

March 25	Boston College	6 – 1	Minnesota	Conte Forum	Recap
(Cleary) David Emma - 00:06 (Cleary, Farley) Bill Nolan - GW - 12:50		First period	No scoring
(McInnis, Brown) David Emma - PP - 02:14 (Beran) Bill Guerin - 04:55		Second period	No scoring
(Dennehy) Bill Nolan - 09:00 (McInnis) Steve Heinze - 11:34		Third period	01:31 - Ben Hankinson (unassisted)
(39 saves / 40 shots) Scott LaGrand (3 shots / 3 saves) Mike Silva		Goalie stats	Tom Newman (27 saves / 33 shots)

Boston College won series 2–1

==== (E2) Colgate vs. (W3) Lake Superior State ====
March 23	Colgate	3 – 2	Lake Superior State	Starr Arena	Recap
(Dickson, Mohns) Jeff Weber - 07:30		First period	03:44 - Jim Dowd (Harris)
(Lillie, Mills) Dale Band - 05:22		Second period	No scoring
(unassisted) Jamie Cooke - GW - 01:12		Third period	04:33 - Karl Johnston (Moger, Smith)
(25 saves / 27 shots) Dave Gagnon		Goalie stats	Darrin Madeley (40 saves / 43 shots)

March 24	Colgate	2 – 1	Lake Superior State	Starr Arena	Recap
No scoring		First period	No scoring
(Gardner) Steve Spott - 00:23 (Mills) Jeff Weber - GW - 13:39		Second period	14:02 - Jim Dowd (Smith)
No scoring		Third period	No scoring
(34 saves / 35 shots) Dave Gagnon		Goalie stats	Darrin Madeley (30 saves / 32 shots)

Colgate won series 2–0

==== (W1) Michigan State vs. (E4) Boston University ====
March 23	Michigan State	6 – 3	Boston University	Munn Ice Arena
(Smolinski, Norris) Shawn Heaphy – PP – 09:03 (Beadle, Miller) Pat Murray – PP – 11:46		First period	05:09 – Shawn McEachern (Sacco, Krys); 10:51 – Dave Tomlinson (Koskimaki)
(Miller) Pat Murray – 10:04 (Miller, Murray) Jim Cummins – GW – 13:31 (Cummins, Murray) Kip Miller – 14:18		Second period	No scoring
(Murray, McCauley) Kip Miller – 03:52		Third period	12:00 – PP – Tony Amonte (McEachern)
(26 saves / 29 shots) Jason Muzzatti		Goalie stats	Scott Cashman (25 saves / 31 shots)

March 24	Michigan State	3 – 5	Boston University	Munn Ice Arena
(White) Bryan Smolinski – 01:02		First period	No scoring
(Woolley, Muzzatti) Shawn Heaphy – PP – 14:00		Second period	00:23 – PP – Phil von Stefenelli (Legault, Amonte); 11:46 – PP – Ed Ronan (Legault, von Stefenelli); 19:30 – Shawn McEachern (Amonte)
(Murray, White) Steve Beadle – PP – 10:54		Third period	02:03 – GW – Mike Sullivan (McEachern, Amonte); 15:38 – PP – Tony Amonte (Legault, McEachern)
(15 saves / 20 shots) Jason Muzzatti		Goalie stats	Scott Cashman (20 saves / 23 shots)

March 25	Michigan State	3 – 5	Boston University	Munn Ice Arena
(Murray, Miller) Steve Beadle – PP – 19:19		First period	11:14 – Mark Bavis (Ahola, Mi. Bavis)
(Miller, Russell) Jason Woolley – PP – 02:58 (Woolley, Miller) Pat Murray – 07:28		Second period	11:33 – Petteri Koskimaki (Ronan)
(Murray, White) Steve Beadle – 10:54		Third period	05:36 – Ed Ronan (Sacco, Ahola); 07:02 – PP GW – Tony Amonte (Cashman); 18:03 – Robert Regan (Sullivan, von Stefenelli)
(21 saves / 26 shots) Jason Muzzatti		Goalie stats	Scott Cashman (23 saves / 26 shots)

Boston University won series 2–1

==== (W2) Wisconsin vs. (E3) Maine ====
March 23	Wisconsin	7 – 3	Maine	Dane County Coliseum	Recap
(MacDonald, Osiecki) Rodger Sykes - 05:05 (Shuchuk, Tancill) Tom Sagissor - 05:33 (Mendel) Gary Shuchuk - 08:37 (Snedden, Decker) Bob Andringa - GW - 10:03		First period	No scoring
(unassisted) Chris Tancill - 01:47 (Byce) Steve Rohlik - 14:45		Second period	09:47 - PP - Scott Pellerin (Burke, Robitaille); 19:15 - SH - Jim Montgomery (Roy)
(Rohlik, Derksen) Gary Shuchuk - PP - 16:00		Third period	00:32 - PP - Martin Robitaille (Carney, Burke)
(23 saves / 26 shots) Duane Derksen		Goalie stats	Matt DelGuidice (29 saves / 36 shots); Scott King (0 saves / 0 shots)

March 24	Wisconsin	4 – 3	OT	Maine	Dane County Coliseum	Recap
(Byce, Osiecki) Steve Rohlik - 00:27		First period		02:52 - PP - Randy Olson (unassisted); 14:42 - PP - Jean-Yves Roy (Olson)
(Osiecki, Decker) Gary Shuchuk - 14:43		Second period		12:00 - PP - Randy Olson (Roy)
(unassisted) Doug MacDonald - 06:17		Third period		No scoring
(Tancill, Hill) Tom Sagissor - GW - 05:15		First overtime period		No scoring
(19 saves / 22 shots) Duane Derksen		Goalie stats		Scott King (29 saves / 33 shots)

Wisconsin won series 2–0

== Frozen Four ==
=== National Semifinal ===
==== (E1) Boston College vs. (W2) Wisconsin ====
March 30	Boston College	1 – 2	Wisconsin	Joe Louis Arena	Recap
No scoring		First period	(Richter) Chris Tancill - PP - 14:17
03:41 - Marc Beran (Franzosa)		Second period	(Richter, MacDonald) Chris Tancill - PP GW - 03:13
No scoring		Third period	No scoring
(29 saves / 31 shots) Scott LaGrand		Goalie stats	Duane Derksen (27 saves / 28 shots)

==== (E2) Colgate vs. (E4) Boston University ====
March 30	Colgate	3 – 2	Boston University	Joe Louis Arena	Recap
(Gardner) Gregg Wolf - 07:10		First period	09:51 - Dave Tomlinson (Brownschidle, Koskimäki); 12:26 - Petteri Koskimäki (Tomlinson, Ronan)
(Poapst, Weber) Kelly Mills - 09:12 (Greyerbiehl, Mohns) Craig Woodcroft - GW - 10:39		Second period	No scoring
No scoring		Third period	No scoring
(23 saves / 25 shots) Dave Gagnon		Goalie stats	Scott Cashman (15 saves / 18 shots)

=== National Championship ===
==== (W2) Wisconsin vs. (E2) Colgate ====
April 1	Wisconsin	7 – 3	Colgate	Joe Louis Arena

Scoring summary
Period	Team	Goal	Assist(s)	Time	Score
1st	WIS	John Byce – PP	Hill and Andringa	1:30	1–0 WIS
1st	WIS	John Byce – SH	Mendel	3:23	2–0 WIS
1st	CGT	Joel Gardner – PP	Dupere and Spott	4:58	2–1 WIS
1st	WIS	Chris Tancill – PP	Andringa and Hill	7:33	3–1 WIS
1st	WIS	Rob Andringa – PP GW	Hill and MacDonald	14:53	4–1 WIS
2nd	WIS	Dennis Snedden	Kurtz and Osiecki	25:03	5–1 WIS
2nd	CGT	Steve Poapst – PP	Gardner	29:42	5–2 WIS
2nd	WIS	Gary Shuchuk – PP	Richter and Rohlik	33:09	6–2 WIS
3rd	CGT	Jamie Cooke – PP	Woodcroft and Lille	49:36	6–3 WIS
3rd	WIS	John Byce – EN	unassisted	59:18	7–3 WIS
Penalty summary
Period	Team	Player	Penalty	Time	PIM
1st	CGT	Steve Poapst	High-sticking	0:37	2:00
1st	WIS	Rodger Sykes	Interference	3:13	2:00
1st	CGT	Andrew Dickson	Holding	6:23	2:00
1st	CGT	Gregg Wolff	Roughing	9:33	2:00
1st	WIS	Gary Shuchuk	Roughing	9:33	2:00
1st	CGT	Craig Woodcroft	Hooking	11:18	2:00
1st	CGT	Bob Haddock	Roughing	13:43	2:00
1st	CGT	Steve Poapst	Closing hand on puck	14:23	2:00
1st	CGT	Troy Mohns	Checking from behind	16:03	2:00
1st	CGT	Jeff Weber	Roughing	16:03	2:00
1st	WIS	Steve Rohlik	High-sticking	16:03	2:00
1st	WIS	Tom Sagissor	Roughing	16:03	2:00
1st	WIS	Dennis Snedden	Interference	19:30	2:00
2nd	CGT	Craig Woodcroft	Slashing	22:43	2:00
2nd	WIS	Brett Kurtz	Roughing	22:43	2:00
2nd	WIS	Rob Mendel	Roughing	24:52	2:00
2nd	CGT	Shawn Lillie	Roughing	24:52	2:00
2nd	WIS	Chris Nelson	Interference	28:23	2:00
2nd	CGT	Craig Woodcroft	Hooking	31:27	2:00
2nd	CGT	Jeff Weber	Tripping	36:54	2:00
2nd	CGT	Kelly Mills	Roughing (served by Andrew Dickson)	36:54	2:00
2nd	CGT	Kelly Mills	Misconduct	36:54	10:00
2nd	WIS	Barry Richter	Roughing	36:54	2:00
2nd	CGT	Craig Woodcroft	Slashing	39:03	2:00
3rd	CGT	Steve Spott	Slashing	41:23	2:00
3rd	WIS	Doug MacDonald	Slashing	44:36	2:00
3rd	WIS	Brett Kurtz	Holding	46:26	2:00
3rd	WIS	Rob Mendel	Interference	47:42	2:00
3rd	CGT	Grant Slater	High-sticking	50:02	2:00
3rd	WIS	Doug MacDonald	High-sticking	50:02	2:00
3rd	WIS	Chris Nelson	Cross-checking	58:34	2:00
3rd	CGT	Dale Band	Roughing	58:34	2:00

Shots by period
Team	1	2	3	Total
Colgate	5	5	14	24
Wisconsin	10	7	3	20

Goaltenders
Team	Name	Saves	Goals against	Time on ice
CGT	Dave Gagnon	13	6	
WIS	Duane Derksen	21	3	59:12
WIS	Jon Michelizzi	0	0	0:48

== All-Tournament Team ==
- G: Duane Derksen (Wisconsin)
- D: Rob Andringa (Wisconsin)
- D: Mark Osiecki (Wisconsin)
- F: John Byce (Wisconsin)
- F: Joel Gardner (Colgate)
- F: Chris Tancill* (Wisconsin)

* Most Outstanding Player(s)
