= Joel Gardner =

Canadian ice hockey player

- Born: September 16, 1967 (age 59) Petrolia, Ontario, Canada
- Height: 6 ft 0 in (183 cm)
- Weight: 190 lb (86 kg; 13 st 8 lb)
- Position: Center
- Shot: Left
- Played for: Colgate; Muskegon Lumberjacks; Detroit Falcons; Knoxville Cherokees; Raleigh IceCaps; Chatham Wheels; SC Herisau; ERC Selb; EV Ravensburg; ERC Haßfurt; Port Huron Border Cats; Saginaw Gears; Madison Monsters; Mohawk Valley Prowlers; Muskegon Fury; Petrolia Squires
- NHL draft: 244, 1986; Boston Bruins
- Playing career: 1986–2007

Joel Gardner is a Canadian retired ice hockey center who was an All-American for Colgate.

== Career ==
Gardner was recruited to Colgate University by assistant coach Brian Durocher and felt as home as soon as he walked on campus. He quickly became one of the top scorers for the Raiders but it was during his senior year that Gardner enshrined himself in Colgate lore. With stellar goaltending from Dave Gagnon, Gardner led the team in scoring and got the Raiders their first ever ECAC regular season title. Colgate then marched through the ECAC Tournament to capture their first conference championship. Colgate won three close games in the NCAA Tournament, producing their first 30-win season, and reached the program's first championship game. In the final game the team was blinded by the spotlight, according to head coach Terry Slater, and the Raiders made several mistakes that led to goals by Wisconsin. Gardner did his best, scoring a goal and an assist in the match, but the Badgers were too much and skated away with a 7–3 win.

After graduating Colgate University with a BA degree, Gardner began a long professional career which started with the Pittsburgh Penguins (NHL) in 1990. Originally drafted by the Boston Bruins in 1986, Gardner became a free agent in 1990 and signed a 3-year contract and played within the Penguin's organization in the IHL and ECHL Leagues. Gardner plied his trade in Europe for most of the next four years. After returning home to North America in 1998 Gardner again started playing in the minor professional leagues for three years before retiring. After retiring as a professional player Gardner restarted his career in senior hockey, playing for the Petrolia Squires for parts of 6 seasons before hanging up his skates for good.

Gardner was inducted into the Colgate Hall of Honor in 2017.

== Statistics ==
=== Regular season and playoffs ===
			Regular Season					Playoffs
Season	Team	League	GP	G	A	Pts	PIM	GP	G	A	Pts	PIM
1986–87	Colgate	ECAC Hockey	30	10	20	30	20	—	—	—	—	—
1987–88	Colgate	ECAC Hockey	31	14	32	46	24	—	—	—	—	—
1988–89	Colgate	ECAC Hockey	30	21	25	46	38	—	—	—	—	—
1989–90	Colgate	ECAC Hockey	38	26	36	62	62	—	—	—	—	—
1990–91	Muskegon Lumberjacks	IHL	49	9	13	22	30	2	0	1	1	0
1991–92	Muskegon Lumberjacks	IHL	5	1	2	3	2	—	—	—	—	—
1991–92	Knoxville Cherokees	ECHL	36	20	34	54	30	—	—	—	—	—
1991–92	Michigan Falcons	CoHL	3	1	2	3	0	—	—	—	—	—
1992–93	Raleigh IceCaps	ECHL	45	22	51	73	30	—	—	—	—	—
1992–93	Chatham Wheels	CoHL	14	8	14	22	2	—	—	—	—	—
1993–94	SC Herisau	NLB	12	3	8	11	14	—	—	—	—	—
1993–94	Chatham Wheels	CoHL	42	30	54	84	50	15	12	8	20	19
1994–95	ERC Selb	2nd Bundesliga	36	49	39	88	101	—	—	—	—	—
1994–95	Detroit Falcons	CoHL	2	1	2	3	0	12	3	0	3	8
1995–96	EV Ravensburg	1st Liga	46	71	83	154	22	—	—	—	—	—
1996–97	EV Ravensburg	1st Liga	49	35	56	91	50	—	—	—	—	—
1997–98	ERC Haßfurt	1st Liga	10	8	16	24	4	—	—	—	—	—
1997–98	Port Huron Border Cats	UHL	20	5	10	15	2	—	—	—	—	—
1997–98	Saginaw Lumber Kings	UHL	47	20	36	56	20	—	—	—	—	—
1998–99	Saginaw Gears	UHL	3	0	3	3	2	—	—	—	—	—
1998–99	Madison Monsters	UHL	4	0	2	2	0	—	—	—	—	—
1998–99	Mohawk Valley Prowlers	UHL	44	15	35	50	16	—	—	—	—	—
1998–99	Muskegon Fury	UHL	7	0	10	10	0	—	—	—	—	—
1999–00	Muskegon Fury	UHL	12	1	4	5	2	3	1	1	2	0
1999–00	Petrolia Squires	OHA-sr.	—	—	—	—	—	—	—	—	—	—
2001–02	Petrolia Squires	OHA-sr.	13	10	12	22	19	—	—	—	—	—
2002–03	Petrolia Squires	OHA-sr.	18	11	21	32	4	—	—	—	—	—
2003–04	Petrolia Squires	OHA-sr.	19	11	17	28	6	—	—	—	—	—
2004–05	Petrolia Squires	OHA-sr.	7	4	4	8	0	—	—	—	—	—
2005–06	Petrolia Squires	OHA-sr.	9	8	8	16	6	6	2	5	7	10
2006–07	Petrolia Squires	OHA-sr.	1	0	0	0	2	7	3	7	10	8
NCAA totals			130	71	113	184	144	—	—	—	—	—
IHL totals			54	10	15	25	32	2	0	1	1	0
ECHL totals			81	42	85	127	60	—	—	—	—	—
CoHL totals			61	40	72	112	52	27	15	8	23	27
1st Liga totals			105	114	155	269	76	—	—	—	—	—
UHL totals			137	41	100	141	42	3	1	1	2	0

== Awards and honors ==
Award	Year
All-ECAC Hockey First Team	1989–90
AHCA East Second-Team All-American	1989–90
ECAC Hockey All-Tournament Team	1990
All-NCAA All-Tournament Team	1990
