= Jeff Sauer =

American ice hockey player and coach

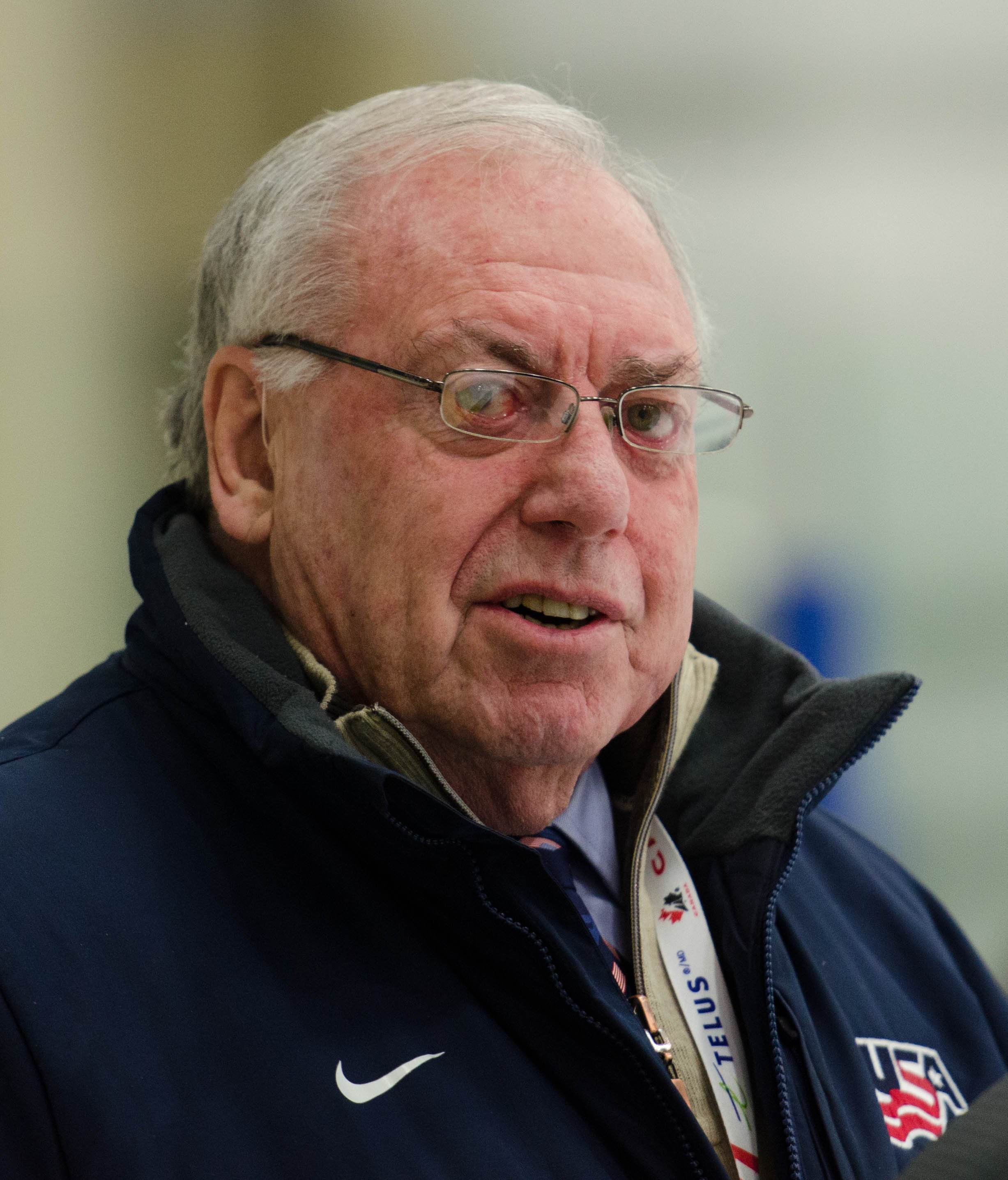
- Sauer in 2015

Biographical details
- Born: March 10, 1943; Fort Atkinson, Wisconsin, U.S.
- Died: February 2, 2017 (aged 73); Madison, Wisconsin, U.S.

Playing career
- 1962–1965: Colorado College

Coaching career (HC unless noted)
- 1965–1966: Colorado College (assistant)
- 1966–1971: Wisconsin (assistant)
- 1971–1982: Colorado College
- 1982–2002: Wisconsin
- 1985: US National Team (assistant)
- 1992: US National Team (assistant)
- 2010: US Paralympic Sled Hockey Team
- 2011–2012: US National Sled Hockey Team
- 2014: US Paralympic Sled Hockey Team

Head coaching record
- Overall: 655-534-57

Accomplishments and honors

Championships
- 2x NCAA national champion (1983, 1990); 2x WCHA regular season champion (1990, 2000); 6x WCHA tournament champion (1978, 1983, 1988, 1990, 1995, 1998)

Awards
- 1972 WCHA Coach of the Year; 1975 WCHA Coach of the Year; 2003 John "Snooks" Kelley Founders Award; 2004 Wisconsin Athletic Hall of Fame; 2011 Lester Patrick Award; 2013 Colorado Springs Sports Hall of Fame; 2013 Hobey Baker Legend of College Hockey Award
Medal record
Men's ice hockey
Representing the USA
Winter Paralympics
Gold medal – first place	2010 Vancouver	(Coach)
Gold medal – first place	2014 Sochi	(Coach)

Jeffrey Sauer (March 10, 1943 – February 2, 2017) was an American ice hockey player and coach. Sauer was the head coach at the University of Wisconsin from 1982 to 2002 and Colorado College from 1971 to 1982. While at Wisconsin, he led the Badgers to two NCAA men's ice hockey championships. He was the special assistant to the commissioner of the WCHA prior to his death.

== Career ==
=== Playing ===
Jeff Sauer accepted an athletic scholarship from Colorado College and began attending the school in 1961. After sitting out the Tigers' disastrous 0-23 season in 1961-62 Sauer became part of the rebuild under first Tony Frasca and then Bob Johnson. Despite his efforts, Sauer couldn't help Colorado College reach the WCHA playoffs in any of his three seasons before graduating in 1965.

=== Coaching ===
After graduating Sauer signed on as an assistant under Johnson at CC and then followed his former coach to Wisconsin, staying with the program until just after the Badgers joined the WCHA before he received his shot behind the bench at his alma mater. Sauer took over for a rather moribund program that had seen only two winning seasons in their past 13 campaigns and slowly brought the team back to respectability. It took Sauer 4 years to build a winning team, finishing 1974-75 3rd place in the conference, but his biggest achievement came three years later when the 5th-place Tigers upset a 33-win Denver team to capture a share of the WCHA tournament, the only conference tournament title in team history. (as of 2014) All told, however, Sauer didn't have much more success than his predecessors as he could only provide Colorado College with 2 winning seasons in 11 years as head coach.

When his former boss Johnson left Wisconsin after 1981–82 to pursue an NHL coaching career, Sauer returned to Madison to replace him and immediately found the success that had eluded him at Colorado College when the Badgers won the national title in 1983. Throughout the 1980s Wisconsin remained one of the top programs in the country, routinely winning 20 games a year and in 1990 Sauer proved that not only could he coach a national champion, but he could build one as well when he captured his second NCAA title. In Sauer's 20 seasons with Wisconsin he provided 2 conference regular season titles, 5 conference tournament titles, 4 30-win seasons and 11 NCAA tournament berths in addition to winning two national titles. He retired as head coach after the 2001–02 season, turning the program over to Badger alumnus Mike Eaves. He retired as the winningest coach in Wisconsin history. He was inducted into the Wisconsin Badgers Hall of Fame in September 2016.

=== Administration ===
After stepping down Sauer agreed to serve as the assistant commissioner for the WCHA for several years and in 2010 he returned as head coach for the US sled hockey team at the 2010 Winter Paralympics. He helped the Americans to their second gold medal in the event and four years later returned for a repeat performance in Sochi. He died on February 2, 2017, from pancreatic cancer.

== Head coaching record ==
Record table
Season	Team	Overall	Conference	Standing	Postseason
Colorado College Tigers (WCHA) (1972–1982)
1971-72	Colorado College	13-19-0	11-17-0	9th	
1972-73	Colorado College	10-24-0	5-23-0	9th	
1973-74	Colorado College	13-17-2	10-16-2	9th	
1974-75	Colorado College	23-16-0	21-11-0	3rd	WCHA first round
1975-76	Colorado College	15-22-1	15-16-1	6th	WCHA first round
1976-77	Colorado College	13-25-2	11-20-1	8th	WCHA first round
1977-78	Colorado College	18-22-1	13-19-0	5th	NCAA quarterfinals
1978-79	Colorado College	12-24-2	11-19-2	8th	WCHA first round
1979-80	Colorado College	21-17-1	13-16-1	3rd	WCHA second round
1980-81	Colorado College	17-19-0	12-16-0	7th	WCHA second round
1981-82	Colorado College	11-23-2	16-18-2	6th	WCHA first round
Colorado College:		166-228-11	138-191-9		
Wisconsin Badgers (WCHA) (1982–2002)
1982-83	Wisconsin	33-10-4	15-9-2	3rd	NCAA national champion
1983-84	Wisconsin	21-17-1	11-14-1	4th	WCHA semifinals
1984-85	Wisconsin	25-17-0	20-14-0	3rd	WCHA semifinals
1985-86	Wisconsin	27-15-0	23-11-0	3rd	WCHA semifinals
1986-87	Wisconsin	23-18-1	17-17-1	4th	WCHA semifinals
1987-88	Wisconsin	30-13-2	22-12-1	2nd	NCAA East Regional semifinals
1988-89	Wisconsin	25-16-5	17-13-5	t-3rd	NCAA quarterfinals
1989-90	Wisconsin	36-9-1	19-8-1	1st	NCAA national champion
1990-91	Wisconsin	26-15-3	19-11-2	3rd	NCAA first round
1991-92	Wisconsin	27-14-2	19-11-2	2nd	NCAA runner-up†
1992-93	Wisconsin	24-15-3	18-11-3	t-2nd	NCAA West Regional semifinals
1993-94	Wisconsin	26-15-1	19-12-1	3rd	NCAA East Regional semifinals
1994-95	Wisconsin	24-15-4	17-11-4	t-2nd	NCAA West Regional semifinals
1995-96	Wisconsin	17-20-3	14-15-3	6th	WCHA third-place game (loss)
1996-97	Wisconsin	15-21-2	15-15-2	7th	WCHA first round
1997-98	Wisconsin	26-14-1	17-10-1	2nd	NCAA East Regional Quarterfinals
1998-99	Wisconsin	15-19-4	13-12-4	4th	WCHA first round
1999-00	Wisconsin	31-9-1	23-5-0	1st	NCAA West Regional semifinals
2000-01	Wisconsin	22-15-4	14-10-4	5th	NCAA West Regional semifinals
2001-02	Wisconsin	16-19-4	12-13-3	5th	WCHA Quarterfinal
Wisconsin:		489-306-46	344-234-40		
Total:		655-534-57			
National champion Postseason invitational champion Conference regular season champion Conference regular season and conference tournament champion Division regular season champion Division regular season and conference tournament champion Conference tournament champion

† Wisconsin's participation in the 1992 Tournament was later vacated by the NCAA Committee on Infractions References:

== See also ==
- List of college men's ice hockey coaches with 400 wins

Awards and achievements
Preceded by John MacInnes; Herb Brooks	WCHA Coach of the Year; 1971–72; 1974–75	Succeeded by Lefty Smith; John MacInnes
Preceded by Fernie Flaman	Hobey Baker Legends of College Hockey Award; 2013	Succeeded by Jack Parker
