= Shawn Heaphy =

Canadian ice hockey player

- Born: November 27, 1968 (age 57) Sudbury, Ontario, Canada
- Height: 5 ft 8 in (173 cm)
- Weight: 175 lb (79 kg; 12 st 7 lb)
- Position: Centre
- Shot: Left
- Played for: Calgary Flames; EV Brunico; SC Langnau
- NHL draft: 1989 NHL Supplemental Draft; Calgary Flames
- Playing career: 1991–2006

Shawn M. Heaphy (born November 27, 1968) is a Canadian former professional ice hockey centre. He played one game in the National Hockey League for the Calgary Flames during the 1992–93 season. His sole game was played against the Tampa Bay Lightning, where he did not register a point, but was credited with two shots on goal. The rest of his career, which lasted from 1991 to 2006, was mainly spent in Europe. Before the NHL, Heaphy played for the Michigan State Spartans.

== Career statistics ==
=== Regular season and playoffs ===
			Regular season					Playoffs
Season	Team	League	GP	G	A	Pts	PIM	GP	G	A	Pts	PIM
1984–85	Sudbury Burgess Power Trains	GNML	70	132	108	240	—	—	—	—	—	—
1985–86	Stratford Cullitons	MWJHL	35	50	32	82	75	—	—	—	—	—
1986–87	Stratford Cullitons	MWJHL	40	63	67	130	172	—	—	—	—	—
1987–88	Michigan State University	CCHA	44	19	24	43	48	—	—	—	—	—
1988–89	Michigan State University	CCHA	47	26	17	43	80	—	—	—	—	—
1989–90	Michigan State University	CCHA	45	28	31	59	54	—	—	—	—	—
1990–91	Michigan State University	CCHA	39	30	19	45	57	—	—	—	—	—
1990–91	Salt Lake Golden Eagles	IHL	—	—	—	—	—	1	0	0	0	0
1991–92	Salt Lake Golden Eagles	IHL	76	41	36	77	85	5	2	2	4	2
1992–93	Calgary Flames	NHL	1	0	0	0	0	—	—	—	—	—
1992–93	Salt Lake Golden Eagles	IHL	78	29	36	65	1638	—	—	—	—	—
1993–94	EV Brunico	ITA	39	30	27	57	57	—	—	—	—	—
1993–94	Las Vegas Thunder	IHL	37	10	5	15	45	5	0	0	0	6
1994–95	Worcester IceCats	AHL	70	23	28	51	50	—	—	—	—	—
1995–96	Prince Edward Island Senators	AHL	77	40	42	82	65	6	4	6	10	6
1996–97	EHC Biel	NLB	42	39	36	75	75	5	4	1	5	29
1997–98	EHC Biel	NLB	40	44	52	96	60	11	8	6	14	26
1998–99	EHC Biel	NLB	37	44	27	71	88	8	6	2	8	12
1999–00	Genève-Servette HC	NLB	36	27	37	64	82	9	2	2	4	8
2000–01	Genève-Servette HC	NLB	40	30	46	76	73	7	6	8	14	33
2001–02	HC Ajoie	NLB	35	25	43	68	65	—	—	—	—	—
2002–03	Heilbronner EC	GER-2	28	15	17	32	79	4	1	3	4	8
2003–04	Heilbronner EC	GER-2	48	28	41	69	115	—	—	—	—	—
2004–05	Fresno Falcons	ECHL	9	2	6	8	6	—	—	—	—	—
2004–05	Eisbären Regensburg	GER-2	31	11	23	34	40	9	7	1	8	4
2005–06	Eisbären Regensburg	GER-2	50	21	38	59	56	5	3	5	8	10
NLB totals			230	209	241	450	443	40	26	19	45	108
NHL totals			1	0	0	0	0	—	—	—	—	—

== See also ==
- List of players who played only one game in the NHL
