= Dave Shields =

Canadian ice hockey player

- Born: April 24, 1967 (age 59) Calgary, Alberta, Canada
- Height: 5 ft 9 in (175 cm)
- Weight: 175 lb (79 kg; 12 st 7 lb)
- Position: Center
- Shot: Right
- Played for: Denver
- NHL draft: 235th overall, 1987; Minnesota North Stars
- Playing career: 1986–1990

David Shields (born April 24, 1967) is a Canadian retired ice hockey center who was an All-American for Denver.

== Career ==
Shields was a high-scoring player in junior hockey, ending his tenure as the league's second leading scorer. He joined Denver in 1986 and continued to produce. He was named WCHA Freshman of the Year after leading the Pioneers in scoring and was drafted by the Minnesota North Stars after the season. Shields' sophomore season was derailed by injury and he didn't get back on track until his senior season. In Shields' final year he finished in the top 10 in the nation and was named an All-American. Despite his efforts, Denver finished with a losing record and were knocked out in the conference quarterfinals. Shields retired as a player after graduating.

== Statistics ==
=== Regular season and playoffs ===
			Regular Season					Playoffs
Season	Team	League	GP	G	A	Pts	PIM	GP	G	A	Pts	PIM
1984–85	Penticton Knights	BCJHL	46	36	47	83	57	—	—	—	—	—
1985–86	Penticton Knights	BCJHL	51	54	76	130	32	—	—	—	—	—
1986–87	Denver	WCHA	40	18	30	48	8	—	—	—	—	—
1987–88	Denver	WCHA	21	10	7	17	2	—	—	—	—	—
1988–89	Denver	WCHA	43	12	28	40	12	—	—	—	—	—
1989–90	Denver	WCHA	42	31	43	74	24	—	—	—	—	—
BCJHL totals			97	90	123	213	89	—	—	—	—	—
NCAA totals			146	71	108	179	46	—	—	—	—	—

== Awards and honors ==
Award	Year
All-WCHA First Team	1989–90
AHCA West Second-Team All-American	1989–90

Awards and achievements
Preceded by Mike Richter	WCHA Freshman of the Year; 1986–87	Succeeded by Rick Berens
Preceded by Tim Budy	WCHA Student-Athlete of the Year; 1989–90	Succeeded by Brad Werenka
