= 1998–99 Nationalliga B season =

The 1998–99 Nationalliga B season was the 52nd season of the Nationalliga B, the second tier level of ice hockey in Switzerland. 11 teams participated in the league, and EHC Chur won the championship and were promoted to Nationalliga A. HC Martigny were relegated due to financial reasons.

== Regular season ==
Pl.	Team	GP	W	T	L	GF–GA	Pts.
1.	EHC Chur	40	27	5	8	163 : 105	69
2.	HC La Chaux-de-Fonds	40	28	2	10	182 : 110	58
3.	EHC Olten	40	21	2	17	146 : 131	44
4.	EHC Biel-Bienne	40	20	4	16	170 : 159	44
5.	Lausanne HC	40	19	4	17	132 : 129	42
6.	SCH Säntis	40	18	2	20	152 : 157	38
7.	HC Sierre	40	16	5	19	149 : 161	37
8.	Grasshopper Club Zürich	40	17	3	20	133 : 156	37
9.	HC Thurgau	40	13	7	20	137 : 146	33
10.	Geneve-Servette HC	40	11	4	25	140 : 173	26
11.	HC Martigny	40	10	2	28	128 : 205	22

== Playoffs ==
Quarter-Finals
1	EHC Chur	3
8	Grasshopper Club Zurich	0
4	EHC Biel-Bienne	3
5	HC Lausanne	1
2	HC La Chaux-de-Fonds	3
7	HC Sierre	0
3	EHC Olten	3
6	SCH Santis	0

Semi-Finals
1	EHC Chur	3
4	EHC Biel-Bienne	1
2	HC La Chaux-de-Fonds	3
3	EHC Olten	2

Finals
1	EHC Chur	3
2	HC La Chaux-de-Fonds	1
