= Mark Bavis =

American ice hockey player (1970–2001)

- Born: March 13, 1970 Roslindale, Massachusetts, U.S.
- Died: September 11, 2001 (aged 31) World Trade Center, New York City, New York, U.S.
- Height: 6 ft 1 in (185 cm)
- Weight: 190 lb (86 kg; 13 st 8 lb)
- Position: Left wing
- Shot: Left
- Played for: Providence Bruins; Fredericton Canadiens; South Carolina Stingrays
- NHL draft: 181st overall, 1989; New York Rangers
- Playing career: 1993–1996

Mark Lawrence Bavis (March 13, 1970 – September 11, 2001) was an American Hockey League (AHL) left winger. He died aboard United Airlines Flight 175 when it was hijacked and deliberately crashed into the South Tower of the World Trade Center on September 11, 2001.

== Biography ==
Born in Roslindale, Massachusetts, on March 13, 1970, Bavis started his career playing hockey while attending Boston University. After he graduated, he played with the Providence Bruins and Fredericton Canadiens in the American Hockey League, then the South Carolina Stingrays in the ECHL, previously the East Coast Hockey League. Bavis was also a scout with the Los Angeles Kings.

== Death and legacy ==
On September 11, 2001, at 8:46 am, Bavis was traveling from Boston to Los Angeles aboard United Airlines Flight 175 when it was hijacked and deliberately flown into the South Tower of the World Trade Center, killing everyone onboard. He was accompanied on the flight by Garnet "Ace" Bailey, director of pro scouting for the Los Angeles Kings. They had been in Manchester, New Hampshire visiting the Los Angeles Kings' AHL affiliate, the Monarchs. Neither of their remains were ever recovered.

Bavis and Bailey are both mentioned in the Dropkick Murphys song "Your Spirit's Alive." Both are memorialized at the South Pool of the National September 11 Memorial on Panel S-3. On October 14, 2012, the Kings brought the Stanley Cup, which they had won in June, to the National September 11 Memorial and placed in on the panel with Bavis and Bailey's names so their families take part in celebrating the Kings' first championship. During the 2001–02 season, the Kings wore "AM" patches on their jerseys in honor of the two.

He is the namesake of the Mark Bavis Leadership Foundation. Mark Bavis Sports Complex in Rockland, Massachusetts is named after him as well.

== Career statistics ==
			Regular season					Playoffs
Season	Team	League	GP	G	A	Pts	PIM	GP	G	A	Pts	PIM
1989–90	Boston University	NCAA	44	2	11	13	28	—	—	—	—	—
1990–91	Boston University	NCAA	33	7	9	16	30	—	—	—	—	—
1991–92	Boston University	NCAA	35	9	18	27	30	—	—	—	—	—
1992–93	Boston University	NCAA	40	14	10	24	58	—	—	—	—	—
1993–94	Providence Bruins	AHL	12	2	5	7	18	—	—	—	—	—
1993–94	Fredericton Canadiens	AHL	45	7	10	17	86	—	—	—	—	—
1994–95	South Carolina Stingrays	ECHL	43	16	16	32	85	9	2	3	5	28
1995–96	Providence Bruins	AHL	20	2	4	6	28	—	—	—	—	—
1995–96	South Carolina Stingrays	ECHL	44	14	22	36	101	8	1	4	5	6
AHL totals			77	11	19	30	132	—	—	—	—	—

- Source: NHL.com
