= Mark Osiecki =

American ice hockey player and coach

- Born: July 23, 1968 (age 58) Burnsville, Minnesota, U.S.
- Height: 6 ft 2 in (188 cm)
- Weight: 200 lb (91 kg; 14 st 4 lb)
- Position: Defense
- Shot: Right
- Played for: Calgary Flames; Ottawa Senators; Minnesota North Stars; Winnipeg Jets
- National team: United States
- NHL draft: 187st overall, 1987; Calgary Flames
- Playing career: 1990–1995
- Coaching career

Biographical details
- Education: University of Wisconsin–Madison

Playing career
- 1987–1990: Wisconsin
- Position: Defenseman

Coaching career (HC unless noted)
- 1996–1997: North Dakota (Assistant)
- 1997–2004: Green Bay Gamblers (HC/GM)
- 2004–2010: Wisconsin (Assistant)
- 2006: Team USA (Video)
- 2010–2011: USA U20 (Assistant)
- 2010–2013: Ohio State
- 2013: USA U20 (Assistant)
- 2013–2016: Rockford Ice Hogs (Associate)
- 2015: USA U20
- 2016: Team USA
- 2016–2023: Wisconsin (Associate)

Head coaching record
- Overall: 46–50–16 (.482) [College]

Mark Anthony Osiecki (born July 23, 1968) is an American ice hockey coach and former professional ice hockey player. Osiecki was the head coach of the Ohio State University ice hockey team from the 2010–11 season to the 2012–13 season. Osiecki played 93 games in the NHL for the Calgary Flames, Ottawa Senators, Winnipeg Jets and Minnesota North Stars. Osiecki was drafted by the Flames in the 9th round, 187th overall in the 1987 NHL entry draft.

Osiecki represented the United States at the 1992 World Hockey Championships, recording one assist in six games.

Following his retirement as a player in 1995, Osiecki spent seven seasons as the head coach and general manager of the Green Bay Gamblers of the United States Hockey League, leading the team to a Clark Cup championship in 2000. He then spent the next six seasons as assistant coach under Mike Eaves at his alma mater, the University of Wisconsin, winning the national championship in 2006. Osiecki then left to pursue a head coaching position at Ohio State.

In 2016 Osiecki was hired as an associate coach with the Wisconsin Badgers men's ice hockey team following a stint with the Rockford IceHogs. When head coach Tony Granato was fired on March 8, 2023, it was also revealed that Osiecki would not return to the Badgers for the following season, and he subsequently became a professional scout with the Pittsburgh Penguins of the National Hockey League on August 30, 2023.

== Career statistics ==
			Regular season					Playoffs
Season	Team	League	GP	G	A	Pts	PIM	GP	G	A	Pts	PIM
1987–88	University of Wisconsin	WCHA	18	0	1	1	22	—	—	—	—	—
1988–89	University of Wisconsin	WCHA	44	1	3	4	56	—	—	—	—	—
1989–90	University of Wisconsin	WCHA	46	5	38	43	78	—	—	—	—	—
1990–91	Salt Lake Golden Eagles	IHL	75	1	24	25	36	4	2	0	2	2
1991–92	Salt Lake Golden Eagles	IHL	1	0	0	0	0	—	—	—	—	—
1991–92	Calgary Flames	NHL	50	2	7	9	24	—	—	—	—	—
1992–93	New Haven Senators	AHL	4	0	1	1	0	—	—	—	—	—
1992–93	Ottawa Senators	NHL	34	0	4	4	12	—	—	—	—	—
1992–93	Winnipeg Jets	NHL	4	1	0	1	2	—	—	—	—	—
1992–93	Minnesota North Stars	NHL	5	0	0	0	5	—	—	—	—	—
1993–94	Kalamazoo Wings	IHL	65	4	14	18	45	5	0	0	0	5
1994–95	Detroit Vipers	IHL	4	0	0	0	4	—	—	—	—	—
1994–95	Minnesota Moose	IHL	35	1	2	3	18	2	0	0	0	2
NHL totals			93	3	11	14	43	—	—	—	—	—

== Head coaching record ==
=== Junior ===
Team	Year	Regular season							Postseason	
Team	Year	G	W	L	T	OTL	SOL	Pts	Finish	Result
Green Bay Gamblers	1997–98	56	23	28	0	5	0	51	3rd in USHL North	
Green Bay	1998–99	56	41	11	0	4	0	86	1st in USHL East	
Green Bay	1999-00	58	35	18	0	5	5	75	2nd in USHL East	
Green Bay	2000–01	56	32	13	0	11	0	75	1st in USHL East	
Green Bay	2001–02	61	35	30	0	6	0	76	1st in USHL East	
Green Bay	2002–03	60	16	36	0	8	5	40	5th in USHL East	Did not Qualify
Green Bay	2003–04	60	27	28	0	4	1	59	5th in USHL East	Did not Qualify

=== College ===
Record table
Season	Team	Overall	Conference	Standing	Postseason
Ohio State Buckeyes (CCHA) (2010–2013)
2010–11	Ohio State	15–18–4	10–14–4–2	9th	CCHA First Round
2011–12	Ohio State	15–15–5	11–12–5–1	t-8th	CCHA First Round
2012–13	Ohio State	16–17–7	13–10–5–1	4th	CCHA Semifinals
Ohio State:		46–50–16	34–36–14		
Total:		46–50–16			
National champion Postseason invitational champion Conference regular season champion Conference regular season and conference tournament champion Division regular season champion Division regular season and conference tournament champion Conference tournament champion

== Awards and honors ==
Award	Year
All-NCAA All-Tournament Team	1990
