= Chris Tancill =

American ice hockey player (born 1968)

- Born: February 7, 1968 (age 58) Livonia, Michigan, U.S.
- Height: 5 ft 10 in (178 cm)
- Weight: 185 lb (84 kg; 13 st 3 lb)
- Position: Right wing
- Shot: Right
- Played for: Hartford Whalers; Detroit Red Wings; Dallas Stars; San Jose Sharks
- National team: United States
- NHL draft: 1989 NHL Supplemental Draft; Hartford Whalers
- Playing career: 1990–2004

Christopher William Tancill (born February 7, 1968) is an American former professional ice hockey right winger who played in the National Hockey League (NHL).

== Early life ==
Tancill was born in Livonia, Michigan. As a youth, he played in the 1981 Quebec International Pee-Wee Hockey Tournament with a minor ice hockey team from Southfield, Michigan.

== Career ==
Tancill was drafted by the Hartford Whalers in the 1989 NHL Supplemental Draft. After playing four seasons at the University of Wisconsin–Madison, Tancill made his professional debut with the American Hockey League's Springfield Indians in the 1990–91 season and was one of the stars leading the team to the Calder Cup championship in that year. He also made his NHL debut with the Whalers that same season, appearing in nine games, scoring one goal and adding one assist.

Tancill was traded to the Detroit Red Wings during the 1991–92 season in exchange for Daniel Shank. For the 1993–94 season, he joined the Dallas Stars. After one season with the Stars, he spent three with the San Jose Sharks organization.

Tancill played in two more NHL games with the Dallas Stars during the 1997–98 season. He then went to Switzerland and spent six seasons in Nationalliga A. He retired following the 2003–04 season.

In his NHL career, Tancill appeared in 134 games. He scored 17 goals and added 32 assists. He also appeared in 11 Stanley Cup playoff games, scoring one goal and adding one assist.

== Awards and honors ==
Award	Year
All-NCAA All-Tournament Team	1990

== Career statistics ==
=== Regular season and playoffs ===
			Regular season					Playoffs
Season	Team	League	GP	G	A	Pts	PIM	GP	G	A	Pts	PIM
1985–86	St. Clair Falcons	NAHL	45	51	99	150	—	—	—	—	—	—
1986–87	University of Wisconsin	WCHA	40	9	23	32	26	—	—	—	—	—
1987–88	University of Wisconsin	WCHA	44	13	14	27	48	—	—	—	—	—
1988–89	University of Wisconsin	WCHA	44	20	23	43	50	—	—	—	—	—
1989–90	University of Wisconsin	WCHA	45	39	32	71	44	—	—	—	—	—
1990–91	Hartford Whalers	NHL	9	1	1	2	4	—	—	—	—	—
1990–91	Springfield Indians	AHL	72	37	35	72	46	17	8	4	12	32
1991–92	Hartford Whalers	NHL	10	0	0	0	2	—	—	—	—	—
1991–92	Springfield Indians	AHL	17	12	7	19	20	—	—	—	—	—
1991–92	Detroit Red Wings	NHL	1	0	0	0	0	—	—	—	—	—
1991–92	Adirondack Red Wings	AHL	50	36	34	70	42	19	7	9	16	31
1992–93	Detroit Red Wings	NHL	4	1	0	1	2	—	—	—	—	—
1992–93	Adirondack Red Wings	AHL	68	59	43	102	62	10	7	7	14	10
1993–94	Dallas Stars	NHL	12	1	3	4	8	—	—	—	—	—
1993–94	Kalamazoo Wings	IHL	60	41	54	95	55	5	0	2	2	8
1994–95	Kansas City Blades	IHL	64	31	28	59	40	—	—	—	—	—
1994–95	San Jose Sharks	NHL	26	3	11	14	10	11	1	1	2	8
1995–96	San Jose Sharks	NHL	45	7	16	23	20	—	—	—	—	—
1995–96	Kansas City Blades	IHL	27	12	16	28	18	—	—	—	—	—
1996–97	San Jose Sharks	NHL	25	4	0	4	8	—	—	—	—	—
1996–97	Kentucky Thoroughblades	AHL	42	19	26	45	31	4	2	0	2	2
1997–98	Dallas Stars	NHL	2	0	1	1	0	—	—	—	—	—
1997–98	Michigan K–Wings	IHL	70	30	39	69	86	4	3	0	3	14
1998–99	EHC Kloten	NDA	42	19	30	49	46	12	4	2	6	16
1999–00	EV Zug	NLA	45	25	26	51	56	11	6	4	10	10
2000–01	EV Zug	NLA	43	27	23	50	42	4	0	3	3	2
2001–02	EV Zug	NLA	43	21	21	42	28	4	1	1	2	2
2002–03	EV Zug	NLA	43	22	22	44	63	—	—	—	—	—
2002–03	SC Rapperswil–Jona	NLA	—	—	—	—	—	7	0	2	2	0
2003–04	EV Zug	NLA	44	12	19	31	24	2	1	1	2	4
AHL totals			249	163	145	308	201	50	24	20	44	75
NDA/NLA totals			260	126	141	267	259	40	12	13	25	34
NHL totals			134	17	32	49	54	11	1	1	2	8

=== International ===
Medal record

Representing United States

Ice hockey

World Championships
Bronze medal – third place	1996 Austria	

Year	Team	Event	GP	G	A	Pts	PIM
1996	United States	WC	8	5	2	7	10
1997	United States	WC	8	2	3	5	2
2000	United States	WC	7	1	2	3	2
Senior totals			23	8	7	15	14

Awards and achievements
Preceded by Ted Donato	NCAA Tournament Most Outstanding Player; 1990	Succeeded by Scott Beattie
