= Lee Davidson =

Canadian-American ice hockey player and coach (born 1968)

- Born: June 30, 1968 (age 58) Winnipeg, Manitoba, Canada
- Height: 5 ft 11 in (180 cm)
- Weight: 180 lb (82 kg; 12 st 12 lb)
- Position: Center
- Shot: Left
- Played for: Moncton Hawks (AHL); Fort Wayne Komets (IHL); Chicago Wolves (IHL); Atlanta Knights (IHL); Hannover Scorpions (DEL)
- NHL draft: 166th overall, 1986; Washington Capitals
- Playing career: 1990–1999

Lee A. Davidson (born June 30, 1968) is a Canadian-American former professional ice hockey player and college coach.

== Career ==
=== Amateur ===
Davidson played center for the 1985–86 Penticton Knights of the British Columbia Junior Hockey League. The Knights won the 1986 Centennial Cup (now Royal Bank Cup), becoming British Columbia's first Canadian Junior A national champion. Davidson scored 34 goals and had 74 assists for 108 points in 48 regular season games, second highest on the team. In 2011, members of the 1985–86 Penticton Knights were inducted into the British Columbia Hockey Hall of Fame.

Davidson was drafted in the eighth round, 166 overall, by the Washington Capitals in the 1986 NHL entry draft. He played collegiately at the University of North Dakota (UND). As a freshman, Davidson’s team captured the NCAA Men's Ice Hockey Championship. For the 1989–90 season, he was elected team captain and was selected to the All-WCHA and NCAA All-American Second Teams. Over four seasons, Davidson scored 80 goals and had 122 assists for 202 points which ranks fifth all-time on UND’s career list. In 2019, Davidson was inducted into the UND Athletic Hall of Fame.

A dual citizen of Canada and the United States, Davidson played alongside future NHL stars Brian Leetch, Mike Modano, Jeremy Roenick, and John LeClair for Team USA at the 1987 and 1988 World Junior Hockey Championships.

=== Minor professional ===
After graduating from UND, Davidson played for the Winnipeg Jets' minor league affiliate Moncton Hawks of the American Hockey League. From 1991 to 1998, he played for several teams in the International Hockey League (IHL), primarily the Fort Wayne Komets. In 1993, Davidson and the Komets completed a 12-game playoff sweep of the Cleveland Lumberjacks, Atlanta Knights, and San Diego Gulls to win the Turner Cup. In 1997, Davidson was selected to the IHL All-Star Team. Davidson's final season (1998–99) was played in Europe with the Hannover Scorpions of the Deutsche Eishockey Liga.

=== Coaching career ===
Following his retirement from active hockey, Davidson returned to UND in 2000 as an assistant coach under Dean Blais. In 2002, he joined UND alumnus Scott Sandelin at the University of Minnesota Duluth as assistant coach for the Bulldogs. Following the 2007–08 season, Davidson resigned from his position, citing the time commitment of coaching, recruiting, and travel. During his six-year tenure, the Bulldogs reached the NCAA Tournament Frozen Four in 2004 and several of his recruits were members of the 2009 Western Collegiate Hockey Association conference tournament champion team and the 2011 NCAA national champion team.

== Awards and honors ==
Award	Year
All-WCHA Second Team	1989–90
AHCA West Second-Team All-American	1989–90
IHL All-Star Team	1997

- British Columbia Hockey Hall of Fame Inductee (2011)
- University of North Dakota Athletic Hall of Fame Inductee (2019)
