= Jamie Cooke =

American Canadian ice hockey player

- Born: November 5, 1968 (age 57) Toronto, Ontario, Canada
- Height: 6 ft 1 in (185 cm)
- Weight: 208 lb (94 kg; 14 st 12 lb)
- Position: Right wing
- Shot: Right
- Played for: AHL; Hershey Bears; ECHL; Birmingham Bulls; Bakersfield Condors; CHL; Memphis Riverkings; CoHL; Flint Generals; WCHL; Idaho Steelheads; Bakersfield Condors
- NHL draft: 140th overall, 1988; Philadelphia Flyers
- Playing career: 1991–2004

Jamie Cooke (born November 5, 1968) is a Canadian American former professional ice hockey and inline hockey player. He was selected by the Philadelphia Flyers in the 7th round (140th overall) of the 1988 NHL entry draft.

Cooke played 13 seasons (1991 – 2004) of professional ice hockey and during the off-seasons he also played professional inline hockey from 1994 to 1999.

At the age of 44, Cooke was selected to join the United States men's national inline hockey team to compete at the 2013 Fédération Internationale de Roller Sports (FIRS) Senior Men's Inline Hockey World Championships held from July 14 – 21 in Anaheim and Huntington Beach, California, followed by the World Games 2013 held from July 24–31, 2013 in Cali, Colombia.

== Career statistics ==
			Regular season					Playoffs
Season	Team	League	GP	G	A	Pts	PIM	GP	G	A	Pts	PIM
1986–87	Bramalea Blues	MetJBHL	37	21	28	49	46	—	—	—	—	—
1987–88	Bramalea Blues	MetJBHL	37	26	44	70	56	—	—	—	—	—
1988–89	Colgate University	NCAA	28	13	11	24	26	—	—	—	—	—
1989–90	Colgate University	NCAA	38	16	20	36	24	—	—	—	—	—
1990–91	Colgate University	NCAA	32	29	26	55	22	—	—	—	—	—
1991–92	Hershey Bears	AHL	66	15	26	41	49	—	—	—	—	—
1992–93	Hershey Bears	AHL	36	11	7	18	12	—	—	—	—	—
1993–94	Birmingham Bulls	ECHL	52	24	23	47	55	10	1	4	5	8
1994–95	Flint Generals	CoHL	13	3	8	11	7	—	—	—	—	—
1994–95	Memphis RiverKings	CHL	35	23	22	45	11	—	—	—	—	—
1995–96	Memphis RiverKings	CHL	63	28	43	71	37	6	3	2	5	11
1996–97	Memphis RiverKings	CHL	59	25	31	56	57	18	8	13	21	22
1997–98	Idaho Steelheads	WCHL	62	30	40	70	100	4	1	1	2	6
1998–99	Bakersfield Condors	WCHL	50	24	26	50	63	2	1	0	1	5
1999–00	Bakersfield Condors	WCHL	69	29	55	84	58	4	3	1	4	16
2000–01	Bakersfield Condors	WCHL	72	33	42	75	80	3	0	1	1	4
2001–02	Bakersfield Condors	WCHL	67	26	22	48	77	4	0	1	1	2
2002–03	Bakersfield Condors	WCHL	64	30	24	54	42	5	2	0	2	6
2003–04	Bakersfield Condors	ECHL	13	1	1	2	27	—	—	—	—	—
AHL totals			102	26	33	59	61	—	—	—	—	—
ECHL totals			65	25	24	49	82	10	1	4	5	8
CHL totals			157	76	96	172	105	24	11	15	26	33
WCHL totals			384	172	209	381	420	22	7	4	11	39

== Awards and honors ==
Award	Year
All-ECAC Hockey Rookie Team	1988–89
