= Gary Shuchuk =

Canadian ice hockey player and coach

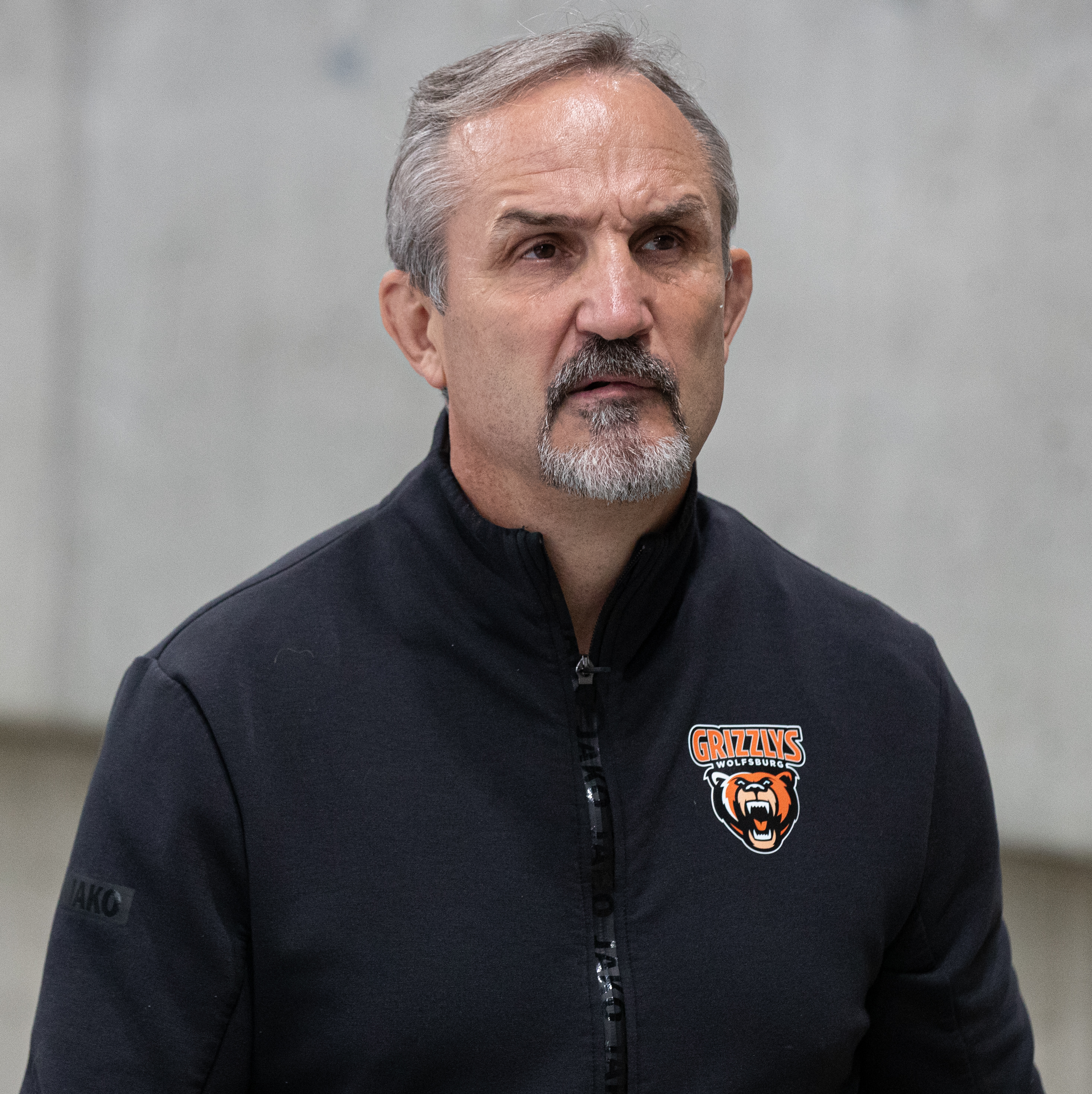
- Born: February 17, 1967 (age 59) Edmonton, Alberta, Canada
- Height: 5 ft 10 in (178 cm)
- Weight: 190 lb (86 kg; 13 st 8 lb)
- Position: Centre
- Shot: Right
- Played for: Detroit Red Wings; Los Angeles Kings; SC Herisau; EC KAC; Düsseldorfer EG; Krefeld Pinguin
- NHL draft: 1988 NHL Supplemental Draft; Detroit Red Wings
- Playing career: 1990–2004

Gary Robert Shuchuk (born February 17, 1967) is a Canadian professional ice hockey coach and former forward who is currently an assistant coach with Grizzlys Wolfsburg of the Deutsche Eishockey Liga. He played in the National Hockey League (NHL) between 1991 and 1996. The rest of his career, which lasted from 1990 to 2004, was spent in the minor leagues and later in Europe. After his playing career Shuchuk turned to coaching and spent several years at the American collegiate level.

== College career ==
Born in Edmonton, Alberta, Shuchuk committed to the University of Wisconsin during his second year playing for the St. Albert Saints of the Alberta Junior Hockey League. He played four years for the Badgers from 1986-1990. During that time he won a WCHA Championship, an NCAA Championship, and was named a First-Team All-American. During the 1989-1990 Season he accumulated 80 points (41 goals, 39 assists), which currently ranks sixth all time for total points in a season in Wisconsin Hockey history, his 41 goals that season also ranks fourth in the program's history. Other notable historic statistics include: second all time in Wisconsin Hockey program history for number of games played (177 GP), fifth all time in career penalty minutes (314 PIMs), seventh all time in career goals (85 G), and 12th all time in career points (176 pts).

== Professional career ==
Shuchuk started his National Hockey League career with the Detroit Red Wings in 1990. Shuchuk then went to the Los Angeles Kings as part of the Paul Coffey-Jimmy Carson trade, and is probably best known for scoring the game-winning goal for the Kings in double overtime of game five of the 1993 Smythe Division finals against the Vancouver Canucks. During the 1993 season, Shuchuk and the Los Angeles Kings made it to the Stanley Cup Final, before falling to the Montreal Canadiens in five games. In addition to his time in the NHL, Shuchuk played in the IHL, and the AHL, with the Adirondack Red Wings, Houston Aeros, Phoenix Roadrunners, and the Orlando Solar Bears. He went on to play in Europe, having played for SC Herisau in the Swiss 1. Liga, for EC KAC in the Austrian Hockey League, as well as Düsseldorfer EG and Krefeld Pinguine of the Deutsche Eishockey Liga. During the 2002-03 DEL season, he captained the Krefeld Pinguine to their first league championship in over 50 years.

== International career ==
Shuchuk played for Team Canada in the 1990 Goodwill Games winning a Bronze Medal in the process. He also captained Team Canada to a Gold Medal in the 2002 Deutschland Cup. He was once again elected to Team Canada for the 2003 Deutschland Cup.

== Coaching career ==
Shuchuk was a player assistant coach for the Springfield Falcons for the 2003-04 AHL season. In 2010 he was hired as an Assistant Coach for the Wisconsin Badgers men's ice hockey team. He helped the program reach two NCAA Division I Men's Ice Hockey Tournament's, as well as winning the 2014 Big Ten Men's Ice Hockey Tournament. In 2015 he went on to become an Assistant Coach for the Michigan Tech Huskies men's ice hockey team, helping the program win the 2017 WCHA Men's Ice Hockey Tournament and securing a spot in the 2017 NCAA Division I Men's Ice Hockey Tournament. In 2017, he was named the head coach of the Janesville Jets of the North American Hockey League.

== Career statistics ==
=== Regular season and playoffs ===
			Regular season					Playoffs
Season	Team	League	GP	G	A	Pts	PIM	GP	G	A	Pts	PIM
1984–85	St. Albert Saints	AJHL	56	30	31	61	88	—	—	—	—	—
1985–86	St. Albert Saints	AJHL	49	42	46	88	103	—	—	—	—	—
1986–87	University of Wisconsin	WCHA	42	19	11	30	72	—	—	—	—	—
1987–88	University of Wisconsin	WCHA	44	7	22	29	70	—	—	—	—	—
1988–89	University of Wisconsin	WCHA	46	18	19	37	102	—	—	—	—	—
1989–90	University of Wisconsin	WCHA	45	41	39	80	70	—	—	—	—	—
1990–91	Detroit Red Wings	NHL	6	1	2	3	6	3	0	0	0	0
1990–91	Adirondack Red Wings	AHL	59	23	24	47	32	—	—	—	—	—
1991–92	Adirondack Red Wings	AHL	79	32	48	80	48	19	4	9	13	18
1992–93	Los Angeles Kings	NHL	25	2	4	6	16	17	2	2	4	12
1992–93	Adirondack Red Wings	AHL	47	24	53	77	66	—	—	—	—	—
1993–94	Los Angeles Kings	NHL	56	3	4	7	30	—	—	—	—	—
1994–95	Los Angeles Kings	NHL	22	3	6	9	6	—	—	—	—	—
1994–95	Phoenix Roadrunners	IHL	13	8	7	15	12	—	—	—	—	—
1995–96	Los Angeles Kings	NHL	33	4	10	14	12	—	—	—	—	—
1995–96	Phoenix Roadrunners	IHL	33	8	21	29	76	4	1	0	1	4
1996–97	Houston Aeros	IHL	55	18	23	41	48	13	5	2	7	18
1997–98	SC Herisau	NLA	40	15	33	48	60	—	—	—	—	—
1998–99	EC KAC	AUT	52	20	36	56	119	—	—	—	—	—
1999–00	Orlando Solar Bears	IHL	71	16	33	49	94	6	1	1	2	12
2000–01	Düsseldorfer EG	DEL	56	17	30	47	62	—	—	—	—	—
2001–02	Krefeld Pinguine	DEL	60	18	32	50	70	3	0	2	2	8
2002–03	Krefeld Pinguine	DEL	51	7	13	20	62	14	1	3	4	34
2003–04	Springfield Falcons	AHL	67	8	21	29	45	—	—	—	—	—
NHL totals			142	13	26	39	70	20	2	2	4	12

== Awards and honors ==
Award	Year
WCHA Champion	1989-90
NCAA Champion	1989–90
WCHA Player of the Year	1989–90
All-WCHA First Team	1989–90
AHCA West First-Team All-American	1989–90
Calder Cup Champion	1991-1992
Stanley Cup Runner-up	1992-1993
DEL Champion	2002-2003

Awards and achievements
Preceded by Curtis Joseph	WCHA Most Valuable Player; 1989–90	Succeeded by Scott Beattie
