= John Byce =

American ice hockey player (born 1967)

- Born: August 9, 1967 (age 59) Madison, Wisconsin, U.S.
- Height: 6 ft 1 in (185 cm)
- Weight: 181 lb (82 kg; 12 st 13 lb)
- Position: Right wing
- Shot: Right
- Played for: Boston Bruins
- National team: United States
- NHL draft: 220th overall, 1985; Boston Bruins
- Playing career: 1990–2000

John Arthur Byce (born August 9, 1967) is a retired American ice hockey player. He played in 21 regular season games and in 8 playoff games in the National Hockey League with the Boston Bruins between 1990 and 1992. The rest of his career, which ended in 2000, was spent in various minor leagues. Internationally Byce played for the American national team at the 1992 World Championships

== Career ==
=== Collegiate career ===
Having been drafted 220th overall by the Boston Bruins in the 1985 NHL entry draft directly out of Madison Memorial High School, Byce walked-on to the Wisconsin Badgers team, where he was redshirted for his freshman season. After a largely unproductive sophomore season, Byce played well in his third year at Madison, scoring 34 points in 41 games as the Badgers claimed the WCHA Championship. In his fourth year on campus Byce was named as an alternate captain for the team and further increased his scoring; tallying 55 points in 42 games. The Badgers lost in the play-off semi finals, however Byce was named as a Second all-team wcha all-star. Byce would continue as an alternate captain during his final year in Madison, and would again increase his scoring, totalling 71 points in 46 games. Wisconsin would again win the WCHA championship, and Byce would again be named as a Second All-Team WCHA All-Star. The Badgers would go on to win the NCAA Championship, which Byce scoring a hat-trick in the championship final. For his efforts, he would be named to the All Tournament Team.

In addition to hockey, Byce was also a talented baseball player, playing as an outfielder. During the 1987 season, he set a school record for 9 consecutive hits, and also earned first-team all-Big Ten honors as a designated hitter.

=== Professional career ===
Upon the culmination of his collegiate career, Byce was signed by the Boston Bruins and played in the Stanley Cup Final. Thus he became the first player to have won an NCAA Championship and compete for the Stanley Cup in the same season. His first taste of regular season play was during the 1990–91 season, where he played 18 games for the Bruins, registering 4 points. The majority of his season was spent with the Bruins AHL affiliate team, the Maine Mariners, for whom Byce registered 48 points in 53 games. Byce would again spend most of his time in the AHL for the 1991–92 season, featuring in only 3 Bruins games. In February 1992, Byce and Mariners teammate Dennis Smith were traded to the Washington Capitals in exchange for Brent Hughes. As a result, Byce finished the season with the Capitals AHL affiliate Baltimore Skipjacks. Byce would return to the Skipjacks for the 1992–93 season, tallying 79 points in 62 games.

The 1993–94 season saw Byce move to Europe, playing for the Jönköping-based HV71 of the SEL, playing 33 games, registering 12 points. Mid-way through the season, Byce returned to North America and joined the Milwaukee Admirals in the IHL. Byce would play for three teams during the 1994–95 season, the Admirals, the San Diego Gulls also of the IHL and the AHL's Portland Pirates.

Byce would remain in the IHL for the 1995–96 season, playing for the Los Angeles Ice Dogs where he had a career best season, registering 85 points in 82 games. The team would then relocate to Long Beach, under the name Long Beach Ice Dogs, where Byce would put up 58 points in 80 games. The Ice Dogs would go on to win the Turner Cup, defeating the Detroit Vipers 4 games to 2. Byce would return to Long Beach for the 1997–98 season, playing only 17 regular season games. Byce would return to Long Beach for the 1998–99 season, playing 31 games and scoring 17 points. In January 1999 Byce, along with defenceman Andy Roach were traded to the Utah Grizzlies in exchange for Rene Chapdelaine and Chris Kenady. During his stint in Utah, Byce scored 31 points in 35 games.

Following his time in Utah, Byce, along with former Ice Dog team-mate Rob Kenny, would move to the United Kingdom in order to play for the London Knights in the BISL. His season in London would be a successful one, with the team leading the league for much of the season, before finishing 4th, as well making the finals of the Benson & Hedges Cup. The team would then go on to win the Play-off final, beating the Newcastle Riverkings 7–3. Following his season in London, Byce retired.

=== International career ===
Byce was named to the US National Team for the 1992 IIHF World Championships. Byce played 6 games, registering 2 points, as Team USA finished 7th overall.

== Personal life ==
Byce graduated from the University of Wisconsin with a degree in Business Administration, and subsequently completed an MBA at the same institution. Since retiring from professional ice hockey he works for RBC Wealth Management. His son, Ty Pelton-Byce, also play hockey and as of June 2020, plays for the Wisconsin Badgers, having transferred from Harvard.

== Awards and achievements ==
- WCHA Champion (1988, 1990)
- NCAA (WCHA) Second All-Star Team (1989, 1990)
- NCAA Champion (1990)
- NCAA All championship team (1990)
- Big Ten Medal of Honor (1990)
- BISL Playoff Champion (2000)

== Career statistics ==
=== Regular season and playoffs ===
			Regular season					Playoffs
Season	Team	League	GP	G	A	Pts	PIM	GP	G	A	Pts	PIM
1984–85	James Madison Memorial High School	HS-WI	24	39	47	86	32	—	—	—	—	—
1986-87	University of Wisconsin	WCHA	40	1	4	5	12	—	—	—	—	—
1987-88	University of Wisconsin	WCHA	41	22	12	34	18	—	—	—	—	—
1988-89	University of Wisconsin	WCHA	42	27	28	55	16	—	—	—	—	—
1989-90	University of Wisconsin	WCHA	46	27	44	71	20	6	2	5	7	2
1989–90	Boston Bruins	NHL	—	—	—	—	—	8	2	0	2	2
1990–91	Boston Bruins	NHL	18	1	3	4	6	—	—	—	—	—
1990–91	Maine Mariners	AHL	53	19	29	48	20	—	—	—	—	—
1991–92	Boston Bruins	NHL	3	1	0	1	0	—	—	—	—	—
1991–92	Maine Mariners	AHL	55	29	21	50	41	4	0	1	1	2
1991–92	Baltimore Skipjacks	AHL	20	9	5	14	4	—	—	—	—	—
1992–93	Baltimore Skipjacks	AHL	62	35	44	79	26	7	4	5	9	4
1993–94	HV71	SEL	33	8	4	12	8	—	—	—	—	—
1993–94	Milwaukee Admirals	IHL	28	7	4	11	10	3	2	1	3	0
1994–95	Milwaukee Admirals	IHL	30	9	11	20	10	15	4	5	9	4
1994–95	San Diego Gulls	IHL	5	2	3	5	2	—	—	—	—	—
1994–95	Portland Pirates	AHL	6	1	1	2	2	—	—	—	—	—
1995–96	Los Angeles Ice Dogs	IHL	82	39	46	85	40	—	—	—	—	—
1996–97	Long Beach Ice Dogs	IHL	80	29	29	58	14	18	6	7	13	4
1997–98	Long Beach Ice Dogs	IHL	17	9	8	17	10	12	4	1	5	4
1998–99	Long Beach Ice Dogs	IHL	37	8	11	19	8	—	—	—	—	—
1998–99	Utah Grizzlies	IHL	35	11	20	31	18	—	—	—	—	—
1999–00	London Knights	BISL	29	11	18	29	6	6	1	4	5	4
IHL totals			314	114	132	246	112	48	16	14	30	12
NHL totals			21	2	3	5	6	8	2	0	2	2

=== International ===
Year	Team	Event	GP	G	A	Pts	PIM
1992	USA	WC	8	0	2	2	2
Senior totals			8	0	2	2	2
