= Sean Hill (ice hockey) =

American ice hockey player (born 1970)

- Born: February 14, 1970 (age 56) Duluth, Minnesota, U.S.
- Height: 6 ft 0 in (183 cm)
- Weight: 205 lb (93 kg; 14 st 9 lb)
- Position: Defense
- Shot: Right
- Played for: Montreal Canadiens; Mighty Ducks of Anaheim; Ottawa Senators; Carolina Hurricanes; St. Louis Blues; Florida Panthers; New York Islanders; Minnesota Wild; EHC Biel
- National team: United States
- NHL draft: 167th overall, 1988; Montreal Canadiens
- Playing career: 1991–2009

Sean Ronald Hill (born February 14, 1970) is an American former professional ice hockey defenseman who played 17 seasons in the National Hockey League (NHL) for eight different teams. He won the Stanley Cup in 1993 with the Montreal Canadiens.

== Playing career ==
Hill was drafted in the eighth round, 167th overall by the Montreal Canadiens in the 1988 NHL entry draft from the Wisconsin Badgers, and was a member of the United States 1992 Winter Olympic Team. On October 8, 1993, Hill scored the first goal in the history of the Mighty Ducks of Anaheim in a 7-2 loss against the Detroit Red Wings. In August 2006, he signed a one-year contract with the New York Islanders.

=== Suspension ===
On April 20, 2007, Hill became the first player to be suspended for abusing the performance-enhancing substance policy the NHL and NHLPA have put in place. Hill began the mandatory 20-game suspension in game five of the Islanders' Eastern Conference Quarter-Final versus the Buffalo Sabres. The Islanders lost the game and were eliminated from the playoffs. Islanders General Manager Garth Snow said that he supported the league's decision to suspend Hill. Hill, who was signed by the Minnesota Wild as a free agent in July 2007, would be required to sit out the first 19 games of the 2007–08 season without pay. In July, Hill claimed that he passed both a lie detector test, and independent drug test regarding his substance abuse. In a statement, the Wild said, "We believe Sean did not knowingly take any banned performance-enhancing substance." Hill returned to the lineup on November 21, 2007, after completing the 20-game suspension.

== Career statistics ==
=== Regular season and playoffs ===
			Regular season					Playoffs
Season	Team	League	GP	G	A	Pts	PIM	GP	G	A	Pts	PIM
1986–87	Lakefield Chiefs	COJHL	3	1	1	2	14	—	—	—	—	—
1987–88	Duluth East High School	HS-MN	24	10	17	27	—	—	—	—	—	—
1988–89	University of Wisconsin–Madison	WCHA	45	2	23	25	69	—	—	—	—	—
1989–90	University of Wisconsin–Madison	WCHA	42	14	39	53	78	—	—	—	—	—
1990–91	University of Wisconsin–Madison	WCHA	37	19	32	51	122	—	—	—	—	—
1990–91	Montreal Canadiens	NHL	—	—	—	—	—	1	0	0	0	0
1990–91	Fredericton Canadiens	AHL	—	—	—	—	—	3	0	2	2	2
1991–92	United States National Team	Intl	12	4	3	7	16	—	—	—	—	—
1991–92	Fredericton Canadiens	AHL	42	7	20	27	65	7	1	3	4	6
1991–92	Montreal Canadiens	NHL	—	—	—	—	—	4	1	0	1	2
1992–93	Fredericton Canadiens	AHL	6	1	3	4	10	—	—	—	—	—
1992–93	Montreal Canadiens	NHL	31	2	6	8	54	3	0	0	0	4
1993–94	Mighty Ducks of Anaheim	NHL	68	7	20	27	78	—	—	—	—	—
1994–95	Ottawa Senators	NHL	45	1	14	15	30	—	—	—	—	—
1995–96	Ottawa Senators	NHL	80	7	14	21	94	—	—	—	—	—
1996–97	Ottawa Senators	NHL	5	0	0	0	4	—	—	—	—	—
1997–98	Ottawa Senators	NHL	13	1	1	2	6	—	—	—	—	—
1997–98	Carolina Hurricanes	NHL	42	0	5	5	48	—	—	—	—	—
1998–99	Carolina Hurricanes	NHL	54	0	10	10	48	—	—	—	—	—
1999–00	Carolina Hurricanes	NHL	62	13	31	44	59	—	—	—	—	—
2000–01	St. Louis Blues	NHL	48	1	10	11	51	15	0	1	1	12
2001–02	St. Louis Blues	NHL	23	0	3	3	28	—	—	—	—	—
2001–02	Carolina Hurricanes	NHL	49	7	23	30	61	23	4	4	8	20
2002–03	Carolina Hurricanes	NHL	82	5	24	29	141	—	—	—	—	—
2003–04	Carolina Hurricanes	NHL	80	13	26	39	84	—	—	—	—	—
2005–06	Florida Panthers	NHL	78	2	18	20	80	—	—	—	—	—
2006–07	New York Islanders	NHL	81	1	24	25	110	4	0	0	0	0
2007–08	Minnesota Wild	NHL	34	2	7	9	28	5	0	0	0	4
2008–09	EHC Biel	NLA	47	3	17	20	112	—	—	—	—	—
NHL totals			876	62	236	298	1008	55	5	5	10	42

=== International ===
Year	Team	Event	GP	G	A	Pts	PIM
1990	United States	WJC	7	0	3	3	10
1992	United States	OLY	8	2	0	2	6
1994	United States	WC	8	0	2	2	6
Junior totals			7	0	3	3	10
Senior totals			16	2	2	4	12

== Awards and honors ==
Award	Year
All-WCHA Second Team	1989–90
WCHA All-Tournament Team	1990, 1991
All-WCHA Second Team	1990–91
AHCA West Second-Team All-American	1990–91
