= Dave Gagnon =

Canadian ice hockey player

- Born: October 31, 1967 (age 58) Windsor, Ontario, Canada
- Height: 6 ft 0 in (183 cm)
- Weight: 195 lb (88 kg; 13 st 13 lb)
- Position: Goaltender
- Caught: Left
- Played for: Detroit Red Wings
- NHL draft: Undrafted
- Playing career: 1990–2001

David Anthony Gagnon (born October 31, 1967) is a Canadian retired professional ice hockey goaltender. Dave played 2 games in the National Hockey League with the Detroit Red Wings during the 1990–91 season, posting a record of 0–1–0 and goals against average of 10.27. The rest of his career, which lasted from 1990 to 2001, was spent in various minor leagues.

== Playing career ==
Gagnon came up from the Windsor, Ontario Junior B team before joining Colgate University in 1987. Dave was guarding the net when the university was in the 1990 NCAA championship game. In 1990 and 1991 he was traded three times, but enjoyed success with Hampton Roads of ECHL, when he was named as co-MVP. Gagnon spent most of his later years with the Roanoke Express where he often shared goaltending duties with Daniel Berthiaume.

The Red Wings signed him as a free agent in the summer of 1990. Gagnon played eleven more seasons in various minor leagues, being named playoff MVP twice in 1991 and 1994.

== Career statistics ==
=== Regular season and playoffs ===
			Regular season									Playoffs
Season	Team	League	GP	W	L	T	MIN	GA	SO	GAA	SV%	GP	W	L	MIN	GA	SO	GAA	SV%
1984–85	Essex 73's	GLJCHL	16	—	—	—	—	—	—	4.45	—	—	—	—	—	—	—	—	—
1985–86	Essex 73's	GLJCHL	22	—	—	—	—	—	—	4.01	—	—	—	—	—	—	—	—	—
1986–87	Windsor Royals	WOHL	30	—	—	—	1779	190	0	6.41	—	—	—	—	—	—	—	—	—
1987–88	Colgate University	ECAC	13	6	4	2	743	43	1	3.47	—	—	—	—	—	—	—	—	—
1988–89	Colgate University	ECAC	28	17	9	2	1622	102	0	3.77	—	—	—	—	—	—	—	—	—
1989–90	Colgate	ECAC	33	28	3	1	1986	93	0	2.81	—	—	—	—	—	—	—	—	—
1990–91	Adirondack Red Wings	AHL	24	8	8	5	1356	94	0	4.16	.851	—	—	—	—	—	—	—	—
1990–91	Detroit Red Wings	NHL	2	0	1	0	35	6	0	10.29	.786	—	—	—	—	—	—	—	—
1990–91	Hampton Roads Admirals	ECHL	10	7	1	2	606	26	2	2.57	.904	11	10	1	696	27	0	2.32	—
1991–92	Fort Wayne Komets	IHL	2	2	0	0	125	7	0	3.36	—	—	—	—	—	—	—	—	—
1991–92	Toledo Storm	ECHL	7	4	2	0	354	18	0	3.05	.909	—	—	—	—	—	—	—	—
1992–93	Adirondack Red Wings	AHL	1	0	1	0	60	5	0	5.00	.844	—	—	—	—	—	—	—	—
1992–93	Fort Wayne Komets	IHL	31	15	11	2	1771	116	0	3.93	.866	1	0	0	6	0	0	0.00	1.000
1993–94	Fort Wayne Komets	IHL	19	7	6	3	1026	58	0	3.39	.875	—	—	—	—	—	—	—	—
1993–94	Toledo Storm	ECHL	20	13	5	0	1122	65	1	3.48	.894	14	12	2	909	41	0	2.70	—
1994–95	Roanoke Express	ECHL	29	17	7	5	1738	82	1	2.83	.917	—	—	—	—	—	—	—	—
1994–95	Minnesota Moose	IHL	16	5	4	2	767	55	0	4.30	.871	1	0	1	60	9	0	9.00	.775
1995–96	Minnesota Moose	IHL	52	18	25	4	2721	188	0	4.14	.868	—	—	—	—	—	—	—	—
1996–97	Roanoke Express	ECHL	60	34	18	6	3386	181	3	3.21	.903	3	1	2	219	10	0	2.73	—
1997–98	Roanoke Express	ECHL	43	25	13	4	2466	119	2	2.89	.903	7	3	4	441	15	1	2.04	—
1998–99	Roanoke Express	ECHL	34	20	9	5	2033	87	2	2.57	.918	3	0	2	139	6	0	2.59	.923
1999–00	Roanoke Express	ECHL	37	23	8	2	2085	87	0	2.50	.915	2	1	1	120	7	0	3.50	.897
2000–01	Roanoke Express	ECHL	32	12	13	3	1732	84	3	2.91	.897	—	—	—	—	—	—	—	—
NHL totals			2	0	1	0	35	6	0	10.29	.786	—	—	—	—	—	—	—	—

== Awards and honors ==
Award	Year
All-ECAC Hockey First Team	1989–90
AHCA East First-Team All-American	1989–90
ECAC Hockey All-Tournament Team	1990

- OJHL-B First All-Star Team (1987)
- ECAC Player of the Year (1990)
- ECHL Playoff MVP (1991) (tied with Dave Flanagan)
- ECHL Playoff MVP (1994)
- ECHL Second All-Star Team (1995)
- ECHL HALL OF FAME INDUCTEE (2025)

== Transactions ==
- Signed as a free agent by Detroit, June 11, 1990.

Awards and achievements
Preceded by Lane MacDonald	ECAC Hockey Player of the Year; 1989–90	Succeeded by Peter Ciavaglia
