= SC Herisau =

- City: Herisau, Switzerland
- League: 1. Liga
- Founded: 1942
- Home arena: Sportzentrum Herisau
- Colors: White, red and blue
- Head coach: Roger Nater
- Website: http://www.scherisau.ch/

SC Herisau is a Swiss ice hockey team.

Founded: 1942
Home arena: Sportzentrum Herisau (capacity 3,152)
Swiss Championships won: 0
Nationalliga B Championships won: 1 (1997)
