= 1989–90 NCAA Division I men's ice hockey season =

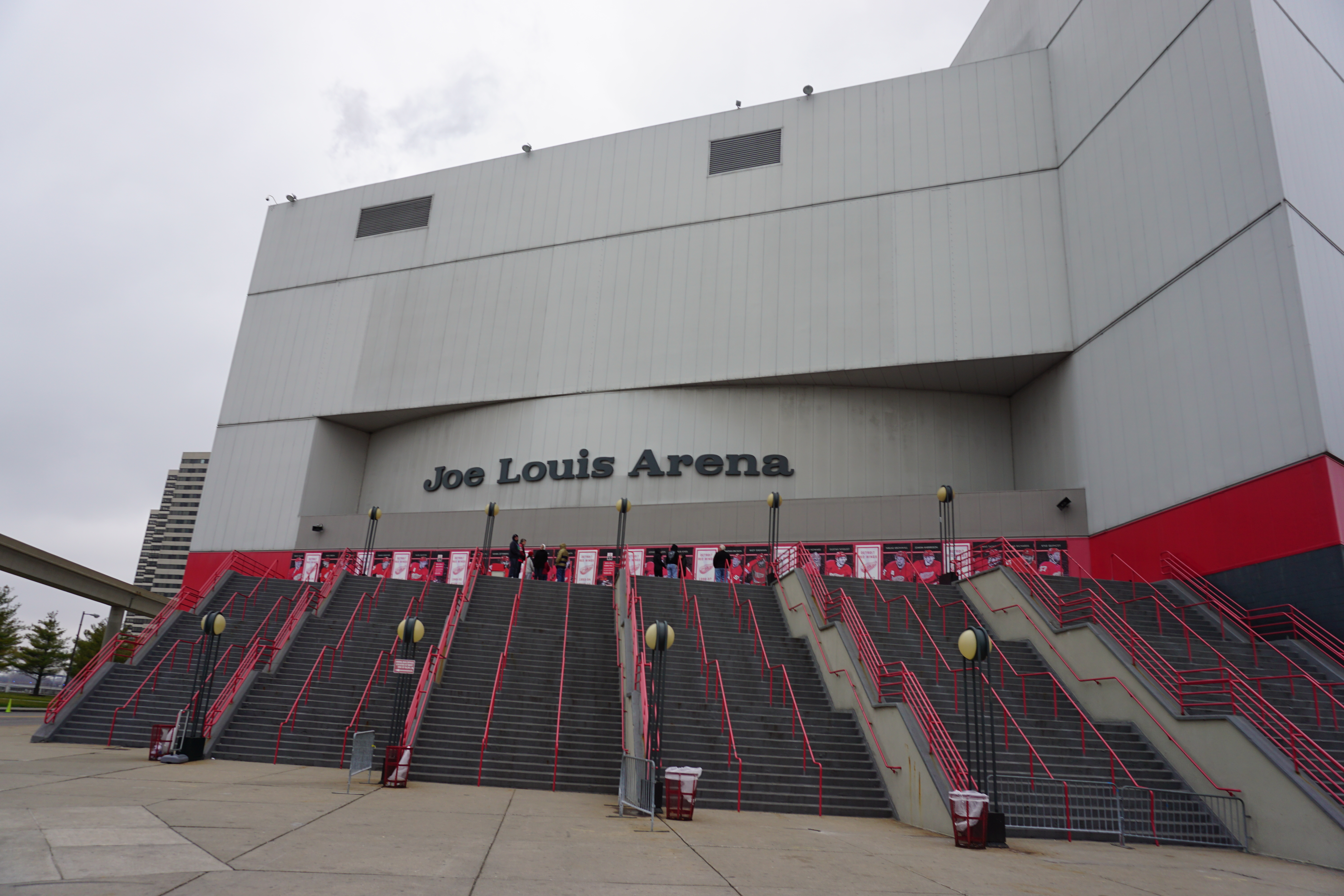
- The Joe Louis Arena served as the host for the 1990 Frozen Four
- Duration: October 1989– April 1, 1990
- NCAA tournament: 1990
- National championship: Joe Louis Arena; Detroit, Michigan
- NCAA champion: Wisconsin
- Hobey Baker Award: Kip Miller (Michigan State)

The 1989–90 NCAA Division I men's ice hockey season began in October 1989 and concluded with the 1990 NCAA Division I Men's Ice Hockey Tournament's championship game on April 1, 1990, at the Joe Louis Arena in Detroit, Michigan. This was the 43rd season in which an NCAA ice hockey championship was held and is the 96th year overall where an NCAA school fielded a team.

== Season Outlook ==
=== Pre-season polls ===
The top teams in the nation as ranked before the start of the season.

The WMPL poll was voted on by coaches. The College Hockey Statistics Bureau (CHSB) / WMEB poll was voted on by media.

This was the last season of the College Hockey Statistics Bureau.

Bob Croce of the Times Union newspaper in Albany, New York, started conducting a poll in 1989 voted on by coaches, media, and NHL scouts

WMPL Poll
Rank	Team
1	Harvard (3)
2	Minnesota (3)
3	Boston College
4	Michigan State (3)
5	Lake Superior State
6	Northern Michigan (1)
7	Bowling Green
8	Maine
9	Wisconsin
10	Minnesota Duluth

CHSB / WMEB Poll
Rank	Team
1	Michigan State (4)
2	Harvard (1)
3	Boston College (1)
4	Minnesota (4)
5	Wisconsin (1)
6 (tie)	Lake Superior State
6 (tie)	Providence
8	Northern Michigan
9	Maine
10 (tie)	Bowling Green
10 (tie)	St. Lawrence
12	Cornell
13	Michigan
14	Denver
15	North Dakota

Times Union Poll
Rank	Team
1	Michigan State (11)
2	Minnesota (3)
3	Boston College (1)
4	Harvard (4)
5	Maine
6	Lake Superior State
7	Northern Michigan (1)
8	Bowling Green
9	Wisconsin
10	Providence

== Regular season ==
=== Season tournaments ===
Tournament	Dates	Teams	Champion
Yale Hockey Classic	November 24–25	4	Colgate
Great Western Freeze–Out	December 18–20	4	Michigan State
Badger Showdown	December 28–29	4	Wisconsin
Riverfront Invitational	December 28–29	4	Western Ontario
Dexter Shoe Classic	December 29–30	4	Maine
Great Lakes Invitational	December 29–30	4	Michigan
Rensselaer Holiday Tournament	December 29–30	4	Rensselaer
Syracuse Invitational	December 29–30	4	Bowling Green
Yoken's Confort Inn Classic	December 29–30	4	Providence
Beanpot	February 5, 12	4	Boston University

=== Standings ===
1989–90 Central Collegiate Hockey Association standings
	Conference							Overall					
	GP	W	L	T	PTS	GF	GA	GP	W	L	T	GF	GA
Michigan State†*	32	26	3	3	55	190	93	45	35	7	3	251	138
Lake Superior State	32	24	6	2	50	169	91	46	33	10	3	246	138
Bowling Green	32	20	10	2	42	153	142	44	25	17	2	211	195
Michigan	32	16	11	5	37	148	125	42	24	12	6	199	151
Western Michigan	32	12	18	2	26	145	162	40	14	24	2	184	207
Ohio State	32	11	17	4	26	138	164	40	11	24	5	160	204
Miami	32	8	21	3	19	138	175	40	12	24	4	173	209
Ferris State	32	6	20	6	18	106	162	40	11	23	6	145	197
Illinois-Chicago	32	7	24	1	15	104	177	38	10	27	1	131	205
Championship: Michigan State † indicates conference regular season champion * indicates conference tournament champion

1989–90 ECAC Hockey standings
	Conference							Overall					
	GP	W	L	T	PTS	GF	GA	GP	W	L	T	GF	GA
Colgate†*	22	18	3	1	37	101	62	38	31	6	1	179	119
Rensselaer	22	14	8	0	28	131	107	34	20	14	0	176	151
Cornell	22	12	7	3	27	86	69	29	16	10	3	109	92
Clarkson	22	12	7	3	27	91	77	35	21	11	3	156	116
St. Lawrence	22	12	8	2	26	87	74	32	13	15	4	113	123
Harvard	22	12	9	1	25	110	77	28	13	14	1	125	108
Princeton	22	11	10	1	23	95	91	27	12	14	1	111	116
Brown	22	8	11	3	19	78	94	29	10	16	3	105	127
Vermont	22	7	13	2	16	71	96	31	9	20	2	98	134
Yale	22	6	15	1	13	75	105	29	8	20	1	102	146
Dartmouth	22	4	14	4	12	58	98	26	4	18	4	69	124
Army	22	4	15	3	11	59	92	30	10	16	4	93	113
Championship: Colgate † indicates conference regular season champion * indicates conference tournament champion (Whitelaw Cup)

1989–90 Hockey East standings
	Conference							Overall					
	GP	W	L	T	PTS	GF	GA	GP	W	L	T	GF	GA
Boston College†*	21	15	6	0	30	101	69	42	28	13	1	197	135
Maine	21	14	6	1	29	88	57	46	33	11	2	238	137
Boston University	21	12	7	2	26	88	63	44	25	17	2	180	144
Providence	21	11	7	3	25	90	69	35	22	10	3	154	106
New Hampshire	21	8	9	4	20	86	86	39	17	17	5	166	156
Northeastern	21	9	10	2	20	96	100	37	16	19	2	167	181
Lowell	21	5	14	2	12	65	106	35	13	20	2	129	193
Merrimack	21	3	18	0	6	64	128	36	10	25	1	123	186
Championship: Boston College † indicates conference regular season champion * indicates conference tournament champion

1989–90 NCAA Division I Independent ice hockey standings
	Conference							Overall					
	GP	W	L	T	PTS	GF	GA	GP	W	L	T	GF	GA
Air Force	0	0	0	0	-	-	-	30	16	13	1	126	122
Alabama–Huntsville	0	0	0	0	-	-	-	35	10	22	3	167	207
Alaska–Anchorage	0	0	0	0	-	-	-	34	21	11	2	158	113
Alaska–Fairbanks	0	0	0	0	-	-	-	30	10	20	0	-	-
Kent State	0	0	0	0	-	-	-	33	14	16	3	120	131
Notre Dame	0	0	0	0	-	-	-	33	18	15	0	151	155
St. Cloud State	0	0	0	0	-	-	-	38	17	19	2	165	154

1989–90 Western Collegiate Hockey Association standings
	Conference							Overall					
	GP	W	L	T	PTS	GF	GA	GP	W	L	T	GF	GA
Wisconsin†*	28	19	8	1	39	147	111	46	36	9	1	254	166
Minnesota	28	17	9	2	36	147	124	46	28	16	2	227	189
North Dakota	28	15	10	3	33	149	114	45	28	13	4	252	175
Northern Michigan	28	15	12	1	31	130	129	42	22	19	1	191	191
Denver	28	13	15	0	26	130	139	42	18	24	0	183	201
Minnesota-Duluth	28	13	15	0	26	114	112	40	20	19	1	170	152
Colorado College	28	10	17	1	21	97	129	40	18	20	2	152	174
Michigan Tech	28	6	22	0	12	112	168	40	10	30	0	150	218
Championship: Wisconsin † indicates conference regular season champion * indicates conference tournament champion

=== Final regular season polls ===
The final WMPL and Times Union polls were released before the conference tournaments.

The final CHSB/WMEB poll was released before the conference tournament finals.

WMPL Coaches Poll
Ranking	Team
1	Michigan State (10)
2	Wisconsin
3	Lake Superior State
4	Colgate
5	Maine
6	Boston College
7	North Dakota
8	Minnesota
9	Bowling Green
10	Providence

CHSB / WMEB Media Poll
Ranking	Team
1	Michigan State (8)
2	Wisconsin (3)
3	Lake Superior State
4	Maine
5	Boston College
	Colgate
7	North Dakota
8	Minnesota
9	Bowling Green
10	Michigan
11	Providence
	Rensselaer
13	Boston University
14	Cornell
15	Clarkson

Times Union Poll
Ranking	Team
1	Michigan State (18)
2	Wisconsin (2)
3	Lake Superior State
4	Boston College
5	Maine
6	Colgate
7	North Dakota
8	Minnesota
9	Bowling Green
10	Rensselaer

== 1990 NCAA Tournament ==
First Round; March 16–18
W4	Minnesota	6	5	–
E5	Clarkson	1	1	–
E3	Maine	8	5	–
W6	Bowling Green	4	2	–
E4	Boston University	5	5	5
W5	North Dakota	8	3	0
W3	Lake Superior State	6	10	–
E6	Alaska-Anchorage	2	3	–

Quarterfinals; March 23–25
E1	Boston College	4	1	6
W4	Minnesota	2	2	1
W2	Wisconsin	7	4*	–
E3	Maine	3	3	–
W1	Michigan State	6	3	3
E4	Boston University	3	5	5
E2	Colgate	3	2	–
W3	Lake Superior State	2	1	–

Frozen Four; March 30
E1	Boston College	1
W2	Wisconsin	2
E4	Boston University	2
E2	Colgate	3

National Championship; April 1
W2	Wisconsin	7
E2	Colgate	3

Note: * denotes overtime period(s)

== Player stats ==
=== Scoring leaders ===
The following players led the league in points at the conclusion of the season.

GP = Games played; G = Goals; A = Assists; Pts = Points; PIM = Penalty minutes

Player	Class	Team	GP	G	A	Pts	PIM
Kip Miller	Senior	Michigan State	45	48	53	101	60
Jim Dowd	Junior	Lake Superior State	46	25	67	92	30
Pat Murray	Junior	Michigan State	45	24	60	84	36
Nelson Emerson	Senior	Bowling Green	44	30	52	82	42
Gary Shuchuk	Senior	Wisconsin	45	41	39	80	70
Lee Davidson	Senior	North Dakota	45	26	49	75	66
Dave Shields	Senior	Denver	42	31	43	74	24
David Emma	Junior	Boston College	42	38	34	72	46
Chris Tancill	Senior	Wisconsin	45	39	32	71	44
Jeff Jablonski	Senior	Lake Superior State	46	38	33	71	82
John Byce	Senior	Wisconsin	46	27	44	71	20

=== Leading goaltenders ===
The following goaltenders led the league in goals against average at the end of the regular season while playing at least 33% of their team's total minutes.

GP = Games played; Min = Minutes played; W = Wins; L = Losses; OT = Overtime/shootout losses; GA = Goals against; SO = Shutouts; SV% = Save percentage; GAA = Goals against average

Player	Class	Team	GP	Min	W	L	OT	GA	SO	SV%	GAA
Matt Merten	Senior	Providence	16	908	8	4	2	38	0		2.51
Darrin Madeley	Freshman	Lake Superior State	30	2137	29	3	3	93	1	.915	2.61
Scott King	Senior	Maine	29	1526	17	7	2	67	0	.900	2.63
Jim Crozier	Junior	Cornell	16	866	10	3	1	38	0	.899	2.63
Scott LaGrand	Freshman	Boston College	24	1268	17	4	0	57	0		2.70
Dave Gagnon	Junior	Colgate	33	1986	28	4	1	93	0		2.81
Mike Mudd	Junior	St. Lawrence	14	732	6	4	3	34	0	.917	2.89
Jason Muzzatti	Junior	Michigan State	33	1976	24	6	3	99	0	.889	3.01
Mark Romaine	Junior	Providence	19	1023	12	5	1	52	0		3.05
John Fletcher	Senior	Clarkson	34	1900	20	11	3	99	0	.907	3.13

== Awards ==
=== NCAA ===
Award		Recipient
Hobey Baker Memorial Award		Kip Miller, Michigan State
Spencer Penrose Award		Terry Slater, Colgate
Most Outstanding Player in NCAA Tournament		Chris Tancill, Wisconsin
AHCA All-American Teams
East First Team	Position	West First Team
Dave Gagnon, Colgate	G	Chad Erickson, Minnesota-Duluth
Greg Brown, Boston College	D	Rob Blake, Bowling Green
Rob Cowie, Northeastern	D	Russ Parent, North Dakota
David Emma, Boston College	F	Nelson Emerson, Bowling Green
Steve Heinze, Boston College	F	Kip Miller, Michigan State
Joé Juneau, Rensselaer	F	Gary Shuchuk, Wisconsin
East Second Team	Position	West Second Team
Chris Harvey, Brown	G	Jason Muzzatti, Michigan State
Keith Carney, Maine	D	Kord Cernich, Lake Superior State
Dan Ratushny, Cornell	D	Kip Noble, Michigan Tech
Joel Gardner, Colgate	F	Lee Davidson, North Dakota
Jean-Yves Roy, Maine	F	Jim Dowd, Lake Superior State
C. J. Young, Harvard	F	Dave Shields, Denver

=== CCHA ===
Awards		Recipient
Player of the Year		Kip Miller, Michigan State
Best Defensive Forward		Pete Stauber, Lake Superior State
Best Defensive Defenseman		Dan Keczmer, Lake Superior State
Best Offensive Defenseman		Rob Blake, Bowling Green
Rookie of the Year		David Roberts, Michigan
Coach of the Year		Ron Mason, Michigan State
Most Valuable Player in Tournament		Peter White, Michigan State
All-CCHA Teams
First Team	Position	Second Team
Jason Muzzatti, Michigan State	G	Darrin Madeley, Lake Superior State
Rob Blake, Bowling Green	D	Don Gibson, Michigan State
Kord Cernich, Lake Superior State	D	Dan Keczmer, Lake Superior State
Kip Miller, Michigan State	F	Jim Dowd, Lake Superior State
Nelson Emerson, Bowling Green	F	Darryl Noren, Illinois-Chicago
Craig Fisher, Miami	F	Pat Murray, Michigan State
Rookie Team	Position	
Darrin Madeley, Lake Superior State	G	
Patrick Neaton, Michigan	D	
Glenn Painter, Ohio State	D	
Brett Harkins, Bowling Green	F	
David Roberts, Michigan	F	
Doug Weight, Lake Superior State	F	

=== ECAC ===
Award		Recipient
Player of the Year		Dave Gagnon, Colgate
Rookie of the Year		Kent Manderville, Cornell
Coach of the Year		Terry Slater, Colgate
Most Outstanding Player in Tournament		Craig Woodcroft, Colgate
All-ECAC Hockey Teams
First Team	Position	Second Team
Dave Gagnon, Colgate	G	Chris Harvey, Brown
Dan Ratushny, Cornell	D	Dave Tretowicz, Clarkson
Mike Brewer, Brown	D	Mike McKee, Princeton
Joé Juneau, Rensselaer	F	Joe Day, St. Lawrence
C. J. Young, Harvard	F	Andre Faust, Princeton
Mike Vukonich, Harvard	F	Greg Polaski, Princeton
Joel Gardner, Colgate	F	
Rookie Team	Position	
	G	
Bob Haddock, Colgate	D	
Allen Kummu, Rensselaer	D	
Aaron Miller, Vermont	D	
Mike Ross, Brown	F	
Hugo Belanger, Clarkson	F	
Scott Thomas, Clarkson	F	
Ryan Hughes, Cornell	F	
Kent Manderville, Cornell	F	
Ted Drury, Harvard	F	
Francois Cadoret, Rensselaer	F	
Greg Carvel, St. Lawrence	F	
Mark Kaufmann, Yale	F	

=== Hockey East ===
Award		Recipient
Player of the Year		Greg Brown, Boston College
Rookie of the Year		Scott Cashman, Boston University
Coach of the Year Award		Shawn Walsh, Maine
William Flynn Tournament Most Valuable Player		Scott LaGrand, Boston College
All-Hockey East Teams
First Team	Position	Second Team
Scott King, Maine	G	Scott Cashman, Boston University
Greg Brown, Boston College	D	Jeff Serowik, Providence
Rob Cowie, Northeastern	D	Keith Carney, Maine
Steve Heinze, Boston College	F	Rick Bennett, Providence
David Emma, Boston College	F	Shawn McEachern, Boston University
Mike Boback, Providence	F	Harry Mews, Northeastern
Rookie Team	Position	
Scott Cashman, Boston University	G	
Peter Ahola, Boston University	D	
Ted Crowley, Boston College	D	
Tony Amonte, Boston University	F	
Jim Montgomery, Maine	F	
Jean-Yves Roy, Maine	F	

=== WCHA ===
Award		Recipient
Most Valuable Player		Gary Shuchuk, Wisconsin
Freshman of the Year		Scott Beattie, Northern Michigan
Student-Athlete of the Year		Dave Shields, Denver
Coach of the Year		Doug Woog, Minnesota
Most Valuable Player in Tournament		Steve Rohlik, Wisconsin
All-WCHA Teams
First Team	Position	Second Team
Chad Erickson, Minnesota-Duluth	G	Duane Derksen, Wisconsin
Kip Noble, Michigan Tech	D	Sean Hill, Wisconsin
Russ Parent, North Dakota	D	Jason Herter, North Dakota
Peter Hakinson, Minnesota	F	John Byce, Wisconsin
Gary Shuchuk, Wisconsin	F	Lee Davidson, North Dakota
Dave Shields, Denver	F	Eric Murano, Denver

== 1990 NHL entry draft ==
Round	Pick	Player	College	Conference	NHL team
1	13	Michael Stewart	Michigan State	CCHA	New York Rangers
1	19	Keith Tkachuk ^{†}	Boston University	Hockey East	Winnipeg Jets
1	21	Bryan Smolinski	Michigan State	CCHA	Boston Bruins
2	22	Ryan Hughes	Cornell	ECAC Hockey	Quebec Nordiques
2	24	David Harlock	Michigan	CCHA	New Jersey Devils
2	26	Nicolas Perreault ^{†}	Michigan State	CCHA	Calgary Flames
2	29	Chris Gotziaman ^{†}	North Dakota	WCHA	New Jersey Devils
2	33	Craig Johnson ^{†}	Minnesota	WCHA	St. Louis Blues
2	34	Doug Weight	Lake Superior State	CCHA	New York Rangers
2	35	Mike Muller ^{†}	Minnesota	WCHA	Winnipeg Jets
2	38	Alexander Legault	Boston University	Hockey East	Edmonton Oilers
2	41	Etienne Belzile	Cornell	ECAC Hockey	Calgary Flames
3	47	Chris Therien ^{†}	Providence	Hockey East	Philadelphia Flyers
3	48	Dan Plante ^{†}	Wisconsin	WCHA	New York Islanders
3	53	Mike Dunham ^{†}	Maine	Hockey East	New Jersey Devils
3	54	Patrice Tardif ^{†}	Maine	Hockey East	St. Louis Blues
3	56	Brad Bombardir ^{†}	North Dakota	WCHA	New Jersey Devils
3	61	Joe Dziedzic ^{†}	Minnesota	WCHA	Pittsburgh Penguins
3	62	Glen Mears	Bowling Green	CCHA	Calgary Flames
3	63	Cam Stewart ^{†}	Michigan	CCHA	Boston Bruins
4	68	Chris Tamer	Michigan	CCHA	Pittsburgh Penguins
4	69	Jeff Nielsen ^{†}	Minnesota	WCHA	New York Rangers
4	73	Darby Hendrickson ^{†}	Minnesota	WCHA	Toronto Maple Leafs
4	76	Rick Willis ^{†}	Michigan	CCHA	New York Rangers
4	79	Chris Tucker	Wisconsin	WCHA	Chicago Blackhawks
4	82	Brian McCarthy ^{†}	Providence	Hockey East	Buffalo Sabres
4	84	Jerry Buckley ^{†}	Boston College	Hockey East	Boston Bruins
5	87	Tony Burns ^{†}	St. Cloud State	Independent	Detroit Red Wings
5	89	Brian Farrell ^{†}	Harvard	ECAC Hockey	Pittsburgh Penguins
5	90	Chris Marinucci ^{†}	Minnesota–Duluth	WCHA	New York Islanders
5	94	Mark Ouimet	Michigan	CCHA	Washington Capitals
5	101	Greg Louder ^{†}	Notre Dame	Independent	Edmonton Oilers
5	103	Brad Pascall	North Dakota	WCHA	Buffalo Sabres
5	105	Mike Bales	Ohio State	CCHA	Boston Bruins
6	106	Jeff Parrott	Minnesota–Duluth	WCHA	Quebec Nordiques
6	107	Ian Moran ^{†}	Boston College	Hockey East	Pittsburgh Penguins
6	110	Dennis Casey	Colorado College	WCHA	Pittsburgh Penguins
6	117	Kurt Miller ^{†}	Lake Superior State	CCHA	St. Louis Blues
6	118	Jason Weinrich ^{†}	Maine	Hockey East	New York Rangers
6	121	Brent Stickney ^{†}	Boston College	Hockey East	Chicago Blackhawks
6	123	Craig Conroy ^{†}	Clarkson	ECAC Hockey	Montreal Canadiens
6	124	Derek Edgerly ^{†}	Northeastern	Hockey East	Chicago Blackhawks
6	125	Chris Tschupp ^{†}	Notre Dame	Independent	Calgary Flames
7	127	Dwayne Norris	Michigan State	CCHA	Quebec Nordiques
7	128	Daryl Filipek	Ferris State	CCHA	Vancouver Canucks
7	131	Ken Plaquin	Michigan Tech	WCHA	Pittsburgh Penguins
7	132	Mike Guilbert ^{†}	New Hampshire	Hockey East	New York Islanders
7	134	Jeff Levy ^{†}	New Hampshire	Hockey East	Minnesota North Stars
7	136	Eric Lacroix ^{†}	St. Lawrence	ECAC Hockey	Toronto Maple Leafs
7	137	Chris McAlpine ^{†}	Minnesota	WCHA	New Jersey Devils
7	138	Wayne Conlan ^{†}	Maine	Hockey East	St. Louis Blues
7	139	Bryan Lonsinger ^{†}	Harvard	ECAC Hockey	New York Rangers
7	140	John Lilley ^{†}	Boston University	Hockey East	Winnipeg Jets
7	143	Mike Power	Western Michigan	CCHA	Edmonton Oilers
7	144	Stephen Rohr ^{†}	Miami	CCHA	Montreal Canadiens
7	145	Patrick Neaton	Michigan	CCHA	Pittsburgh Penguins
7	147	James Mackey ^{†}	Yale	ECAC Hockey	Boston Bruins
8	150	Wes McCauley	Michigan State	CCHA	Detroit Red Wings
8	152	Petteri Koskimaki	Boston University	Hockey East	Pittsburgh Penguins
8	154	Dean Hulett	Lake Superior State	CCHA	Los Angeles Kings
8	157	Dan Stiver	Michigan	CCHA	Toronto Maple Leafs
8	160	Todd Hedlund ^{†}	Wisconsin	WCHA	New York Rangers
8	162	Martin d’Orsonnens	Clarkson	ECAC Hockey	Hartford Whalers
8	163	Hugo Bélanger	Clarkson	ECAC Hockey	Chicago Blackhawks
8	167	Shawn Murray ^{†}	Colgate	ECAC Hockey	Calgary Flames
8	168	John Gruden ^{†}	Ferris State	CCHA	Boston Bruins
9	169	Pat Mazzoli ^{†}	Ferris State	CCHA	Quebec Nordiques
9	171	Tony Gruba ^{†}	St. Cloud State	Independent	Detroit Red Wings
9	174	John Joyce ^{†}	Boston College	Hockey East	New York Islanders
9	176	Joe Biondi	Minnesota–Duluth	WCHA	Minnesota North Stars
9	177	Ken Klee ^{†}	Bowling Green	CCHA	Washington Capitals
9	180	Parris Duffus	Cornell	ECAC Hockey	St. Louis Blues
9	181	Andy Silverman ^{†}	Maine	Hockey East	New York Rangers
9	183	Corey Osmak ^{†}	Minnesota–Duluth	WCHA	Hartford Whalers
9	186	Derek Maguire ^{†}	Harvard	ECAC Hockey	Montreal Canadiens
9	188	Michael Murray ^{†}	Lowell	Hockey East	Calgary Flames
9	189	Darren Wetherill ^{†}	Lake Superior State	CCHA	Boston Bruins
10	192	Travis Tucker ^{†}	Lowell	Hockey East	Detroit Red Wings
10	193	Greg Hanson ^{†}	Minnesota–Duluth	WCHA	Philadelphia Flyers
10	194	Tim Fingerhut ^{†}	Vermont	ECAC Hockey	Pittsburgh Penguins
10	195	R. J. Enga ^{†}	Colorado College	WCHA	New York Islanders
10	198	Mike Boback ^{†}	Providence	Hockey East	Washington Capitals
10	199	Bob Chebator ^{†}	New Hampshire	Hockey East	Toronto Maple Leafs
10	201	Steve Widmeyer	Maine	Hockey East	St. Louis Blues
10	205	Erik Peterson ^{†}	Providence	Hockey East	Chicago Blackhawks
10	207	Mark Kettelhut ^{†}	Minnesota–Duluth	WCHA	Montreal Canadiens
10	210	Dean Capuano ^{†}	Providence	Hockey East	Boston Bruins
11	213	Brett Larson ^{†}	Minnesota–Duluth	WCHA	Detroit Red Wings
11	215	Michael Thompson	Michigan State	CCHA	Pittsburgh Penguins
11	216	Martin Lacroix	St. Lawrence	ECAC Hockey	New York Islanders
11	219	Alan Brown	Colgate	ECAC Hockey	Washington Capitals
11	220	Scott Malone ^{†}	New Hampshire	Hockey East	Toronto Maple Leafs
11	223	Brett Lievers ^{†}	St. Cloud State	Independent	New York Rangers
11	226	Steve Dubinsky	Clarkson	ECAC Hockey	Chicago Blackhawks
12	232	Wade Klippenstein	Alaska–Fairbanks	Independent	Quebec Nordiques
12	234	John Hendry	Lake Superior State	CCHA	Detroit Red Wings
12	235	Billy Lund ^{†}	Minnesota–Duluth	WCHA	Philadelphia Flyers
12	236	Brian Bruininks	Colorado College	WCHA	Pittsburgh Penguins
12	237	Andrew Shier ^{†}	Wisconsin	WCHA	New York Islanders
12	238	Troy Mohns	Colgate	ECAC Hockey	Los Angeles Kings
12	239	J. P. McKersie ^{†}	Boston University	Hockey East	Minnesota North Stars
12	241	Nicholas Vachon ^{†}	Boston University	Hockey East	Toronto Maple Leafs
12	242	Todd Reirden ^{†}	Bowling Green	CCHA	New Jersey Devils
12	245	Keith Morris	Alaska–Anchorage	Independent	Winnipeg Jets
12	247	Dino Grossi	Northeastern	Hockey East	Chicago Blackhawks

† incoming freshman

== See also ==
- 1989–90 NCAA Division III men's ice hockey season
