= 1991 NCAA Division I men's ice hockey tournament =

- Teams: 12
- Finals site: St. Paul Civic Center, Saint Paul, Minnesota
- Champions: Northern Michigan Wildcats (1st title)
- Runner-up: Boston University Terriers (6th title game)
- Semifinalists: Clarkson Golden Knights (7th Frozen Four); Maine Black Bears (3rd Frozen Four)
- Winning coach: Rick Comley (1st title)
- MOP: Scott Beattie (Northern Michigan)
- Attendance: 35,938

The 1991 NCAA Division I Men's Ice Hockey Tournament was the culmination of the 1990–91 NCAA Division I men's ice hockey season, the 44th such tournament in NCAA history. It was held between March 15 and March 30, 1991, and concluded with Northern Michigan defeating Boston University 8-7 in overtime. All First Round and Quarterfinals matchups were held at home team venues with the 'Frozen Four' games being played at the St. Paul Civic Center in Saint Paul, Minnesota.

== Qualifying teams ==
The NCAA permitted 12 teams to qualify for the tournament and divided its qualifiers into two regions (East and West). Each of the tournament champions from the four Division I conferences (CCHA, ECAC, Hockey East and WCHA) received automatic invitations into the tournament with At-large bids making up the remaining 8 teams. The NCAA permitted one Independent team to participate in the tournament and because the previous year the independent qualifier was placed in the East pool the two western conferences (CCHA and WCHA) would split only three open spots as opposed to the East's four open spots. The top four remaining eastern teams and the top three remaining western teams received invitations and were seeded with the automatic qualifiers according to their ranking.

East							West						
Seed	School	Conference	Record	Berth type	Appearance	Last bid	Seed	School	Conference	Record	Berth type	Appearance	Last bid
1	Maine	Hockey East	30–8–2	At-large bid	5th	1990	1	Lake Superior State	CCHA	35–3–4	Tournament champion	5th	1990
2	Boston University	Hockey East	25–10–2	Tournament champion	17th	1990	2	Northern Michigan	WCHA	34–5–4	Tournament champion	4th	1989
3	Boston College	Hockey East	27–10–0	At-large bid	18th	1990	3	Michigan	CCHA	32–7–3	At-large bid	14th	1977
4	Clarkson	ECAC	25–7–2	Tournament champion	11th	1990	4	Minnesota	WCHA	28–7–5	At-large bid	18th	1990
5	Providence	Hockey East	23–10–8	At-large bid	7th	1989	5	Wisconsin	WCHA	26–13–3	At-large bid	12th	1990
6	Cornell	ECAC	17–9–3	At-large bid	10th	1986	6	Alaska-Anchorage	Independent	20–15–4	At-large bid	2nd	1990

== Format ==
The tournament featured four rounds of play. The three odd-number ranked teams from one region were placed into a bracket with the three even-number ranked teams of the other region. The teams were then seeded according to their ranking with the top two teams in each bracket receiving byes into the quarterfinals. In the first round the third and sixth seeds and the fourth and fifth seeds played best-of-three series to determine which school advanced to the Quarterfinals with the winners of the 4 vs. 5 series playing the first seed and the winner of the 3 vs. 6 series playing the second seed. In the Quarterfinals the matches were best-of-three series once more with the victors advancing to the National Semifinals. Beginning with the Semifinals all games were played at the Saint Paul Civic Center and all series became Single-game eliminations. The winning teams in the semifinals advanced to the National Championship Game.

== Bracket ==
First Round; March 15–17
W4	Minnesota	3	8	8
E5	Providence	4	4	3
E3	Boston College	2	1	–
W6	Alaska-Anchorage	3	3	–
E4	Clarkson	8	5	–
W5	Wisconsin	3	4	–
W3	Michigan	4	6	9
E6	Cornell	5*	4	3

Quarterfinals; March 22–24
E1	Maine	4	5	–
W4	Minnesota	0	3	–
W2	Northern Michigan	8	5	–
W6	Alaska Anchorage	5	3	–
W1	Lake Superior State	3	6	3
E4	Clarkson	7	2	4
E2	Boston University	4	8	–
W3	Michigan	1	1	–

National Semifinals; March 28
E1	Maine	3
W2	Northern Michigan	5
E4	Clarkson	3
E2	Boston University	7

National Championship; March 30
W2	Northern Michigan	8***
E2	Boston University	7

Note: * denotes overtime period(s)

== Results ==
=== First round ===
==== (E3) Boston College vs. (W6) Alaska-Anchorage ====
March 15	Boston College	2 – 3	Alaska-Anchorage	Conte Forum	Recap
No scoring		First period	No scoring
(unassisted) Bill Guerin - 14:36		Second period	No scoring
(O'Neill) Dave Pergola - 09:55		Third period	09:12 - Rob Conn (Kraft, Pankewicz); 10:12 - Brian Kraft (Conn); 13:39 - GW - Steve Bogoyevac (Coulson, Donald)
(23 saves / 26 shots) Scott LaGrand		Goalie stats	Paul Krake (43 saves / 45 shots)

March 16	Boston College	1 – 3	Alaska-Anchorage	Conte Forum	Recap
(Crowley, Emma) Bill Guerin - PP - 17:17		First period	16:09 - PP - Tim Kollman (Conn)
No scoring		Second period	01:05 - PP GW - Jeff Batters (Kollman, Bogoyevac); 15:21 - PP - Trent Pankewicz (Conn)
No scoring		Third period	No scoring
(32 saves / 35 shots) Sandy Galuppo		Goalie stats	Paul Krake (39 saves / 40 shots)

Alaska-Anchorage won series 2–0

==== (E4) Clarkson vs. (W5) Wisconsin ====
March 15	Clarkson	8 – 3	Wisconsin	Walker Arena	Recap
(Lapointe) Hugo Bélanger - 04:04 (Bélanger, M. Green) Guy Sanderson - PP - 15:57 (Tretowicz, Conroy) Mike Casselman - 19:34		First period	00:47 - Brett Kurtz (Shier, Zent); 14:28 - Jon Helgeson (Shier, Hill)
(d'Orsonnens, Henrich) Dave Trombley - GW - 04:15 (Dubinsky) Scott Thomas - 06:17 (Bélanger, Sanderson) Mark Green - PP - 16:38		Second period	02:22 - Jason Zent (Kurtz)
(Conroy, Casselman) Ed Sabo - 01:53 (Trombley, Tavi) Hugo Bélanger - PP - 14:49		Third period	No scoring
(33 saves / 36 shots) Chris Rogles		Goalie stats	Duane Derksen (17 saves / 25 shots)

March 16	Clarkson	5 – 4	Wisconsin	Walker Arena	Recap
(Trombley, Tavi) Guy Sanderson - PP - 11:53 (M. Green, Sanderson) Hugo Bélanger - PP - 13:05		First period	02:38 - Blaine Moore (Granato, Hill)
(Tretowicz) Guy Sanderson - 19:52		Second period	02:50 - Doug MacDonald (Hill, Richter); 07:20 - Jacques Auger (MacDonald); 12:03 - PP - Sean Hill (MacDonald, Andringa)
(Sabo, Dubinsky) Mike Kozak - SH - 05:23 (Bélanger, Trombley) Mark Green - PP GW - 11:58		Third period	No scoring
(34 saves / 38 shots) Chris Rogles		Goalie stats	Duane Derksen (29 saves / 34 shots)

Clarkson won series 2–0

==== (W3) Michigan vs. (E6) Cornell ====
March 15	Michigan	4 – 5	OT	Cornell	Yost Ice Arena	Recap
(Wiseman, Stewart) Dan Stiver - 01:59		First period		18:47 - Bruce Frauley (Manderville, Hannah)
(Neaton) Mike Helber - 08:06 (Stewart, Tamer) Aaron Ward - 19:48		Second period		07:56 - Doug Derraugh (Andison, R. Hughes); 15:41 - SH - Kent Manderville (Williams)
(Wiseman) Cam Stewart - PP - 08:49		Third period		19:58 - EA - Kent Manderville (Dragon, Derraugh)
No scoring		First overtime period		00:21 - GW - Trent Andison (Ratushny, Derraugh)
(28 saves / 33 shots) Steve Shields		Goalie stats		Jim Crozier (14 saves / 18 shots)

March 16	Michigan	6 – 4	Cornell	Yost Ice Arena	Recap
No scoring		First period	No scoring
(Evans) Cam Stewart - 07:34 (Helber) Pat Neaton - 08:24 (Helber, Harlock) Chris Tamer - 11:02 (Roberts, Neaton) Denny Felsner - 18:16		Second period	12:11 - PP - Doug Derraugh (Ratushny, Frauley); 13:00 - PP - Doug Derraugh (R. Hughes, Ratushny)
(Helber) Denny Felsner - PP GW - 07:18 (Felsner, Roberts) Mark Ouimet - 19:07		Third period	06:02 - PP - Trent Andison (Derraugh, Frauley); 17:23 - PP - Trent Andison (Derraugh, Vanini)
(22 saves / 26 shots) Steve Shields		Goalie stats	Jim Crozier (20 saves / shots); Corrie D'Alessio (0 saves / 0 shots)

March 17	Michigan	9 – 3	Cornell	Yost Ice Arena	Recap
(Felsner, Sorensen) David Roberts - PP - 07:53 (D. Stone, Helber) Ted Kramer - 12:46		First period	02:52 - PP - Doug Derraugh (Ratushny, Andison)
(Tamer, Stiver) Brian Wiseman - PP - 01:00 (unassisted) Dan Stiver - GW - 01:19 (Wiseman, Stewart) Dan Stiver - PP - 08:44 (Stewart, Neaton) Brian Wiseman - PP - 18:33		Second period	No scoring
(Kramer, Helber) Don Stone - 02:41 (Felsner) David Roberts - 14:46 (Helber) Ted Kramer - 19:32		Third period	06:32 - PP - Bruce Frauley (Hughes, Vanini); 12:49 - Doug Derraugh (Hughes, Burke)
(20 shots / 23 saves) Chris Gordon		Goalie stats	Jim Crozier (18 saves / 23 shots); Corrie D'Alessio (6 saves / 10 shots)

Michigan won series 2–1

==== (W4) Minnesota vs. (E5) Providence ====
March 15	Minnesota	3 – 4	Providence	Mariucci Arena	Recap
No scoring		First period	07:16 - Mike Boback (unassisted); 11:14 - PP - Mario Aubé (Boback, Gaudreau)
(Gernander, Klatt) Larry Olimb - 03:36 (L. Johnson, Bischoff) Ben Hankinson - 11:48		Second period	07:29 - Brian Ridolfi (Rooney)
(L. Johnson, Olimb) Travis Richards - 02:02		Third period	09:09 - PP GW - Mike Boback (Rooney, Cowan)
(15 saves / 19 shots) Jeff Stolp		Goalie stats	Mike Heinke (35 saves / 38 shots)

March 16	Minnesota	8 – 4	Providence	Mariucci Arena	Recap
(Olimb, Pederson) Ken Gernander - PP - 09:11		First period	No scoring
(Olimb, Pederson) Ken Gernander - PP - 00:37 (C. Johnson, Nielsen) Cory Laylin - PP - 03:47 (Olimb, Klatt) Ken Gernander - 08:29 (C. Johnson) Travis Richards - GW - 19:51		Second period	01:13 - Brian Ridolfi (Boback, Gaudreau); 07:58 - Gary Socha (Therien); 15:00 - Mike Boback (unassisted)
(Klatt, Richards) Jeff Nielsen - 00:37 (C. Johnson) Cory Laylin - 06:20 (Newman) Tom Pederson - 18:39		Third period	19:43 - Brian McCarthy (Huyber)
(14 saves / 18 shots) Tom Newman		Goalie stats	Mike Heinke (25 saves / 33 shots)

March 17	Minnesota	8 – 3	Providence	Mariucci Arena	Recap
(Miller, Zmolek) Tom Pederson - 04:27 (Richards, Olimb) Ken Gernander - 15:39		First period	11:03 - SH - Rob Gaudreau (Boback)
(Laylin, Nielsen) Craig Johnson - 02:05		Second period	No scoring
(L. Johnson) Jeff Nielsen - GW - 02:26 (Miller, L. Johnson) Craig Johnson - 11:10 (Bischoff, Zmolek) Tom Pederson - 11:44 (L. Johnson) Grant Bischoff - 14:53 (Zmolek) Cory Laylin - 15:06		Third period	03:58 - PP - Rob Gaudreau (Boback, Cowan); 18:46 - Larry Rooney (Boback)
(30 saves / 33 shots) Jeff Stolp		Goalie stats	Mike Heinke (26 saves / 34 shots)

Minnesota won series 2–1

=== Quarterfinals ===
==== (E1) Maine vs. (W4) Minnesota ====
March 22	Maine	4 – 0	Minnesota	Alfond Arena	Recap
(Montgomery, Robitaille) Keith Carney - PP GW - 15:02		First period	No scoring
No scoring		Second period	No scoring
(Montgomery, Carney) Jean-Yves Roy - PP - 08:52 (Straub, Montgomery) Brian Downey - PP - 16:17 (Imes, Tepper) Kent Salfi - EN - 19:47		Third period	No scoring
(27 saves / 27 shots) Mike Dunham		Goalie stats	Jeff Stolp (27 saves / 30 shots)

March 23	Maine	5 – 3	Minnesota	Alfond Arena	Recap
(Downey, Montgomery) Keith Carney - PP - 03:42		First period	04:14 - Luke Johnson (Hankinson, Bischoff); 17:11 - Tom Pederson (Gernander, Klatt)
(Murphy) Chris Imes - 08:23 (Roy, Downey) Jim Montgomery - 12:02		Second period	01:42 - PP - Grant Bischoff (Hankinson, Miller)
(unassisted) Martin Robitaille - GW - 00:25 (Downey) Jean-Yves Roy - 14:17		Third period	No scoring
(26 saves / 29 shots) Garth Snow		Goalie stats	Tom Newman (19 saves / 24 shots)

Maine won series 2–0

==== (E2) Boston University vs. (W3) Michigan ====
March 22	Boston University	4 – 1	Michigan	Walter Brown Arena	Recap
(Koskimäki, Cashman) Dave Tomlinson - PP - 07:04 (unassisted) David Sacco - GW - 12:15 (McEachern) Keith Tkachuk - 13:54		First period	No scoring
No scoring		Second period	No scoring
(unassisted) Tom Dion - EN - 19:21		Third period	17:16 - EA - Don Stone (Ouimet, Roberts)
(20 saves / 21 shots) Scott Cashman		Goalie stats	Chris Gordon (26 saves / 29 shots)

March 23	Boston University	8 – 1	Michigan	Walter Brown Arena	Recap
(Tomlinson, von Stefenelli) Petteri Koskimäki - 03:23 (Mi. Bavis, Friedman) Darin MacDonald - GW - 12:47		First period	No scoring
(O'Sullivan, Bradley) Dave Tomlinson - 03:03 (Tkachuk, Sacco) Tony Amonte - 04:30 (Ahola, Lachance) Ed Ronan - PP - 09:32 (Mi. Bavis, Ma. Bavis) Tom Dion - 9:56 (Dion) David Sacco - 10:35		Second period	No scoring
(unassisted) Tony Amonte - 04:39		Third period	05:47 - PP - Brian Wiseman (M. Stone, Felsner)
(21 saves / 22 shots) John Bradley		Goalie stats	Steve Shields (7 saves / 11 shots); Chris Gordon (14 saves / 18 shots)

Boston University won series 2–0

==== (W1) Lake Superior State vs. (E4) Clarkson ====
March 22	Lake Superior State	3 – 7	Clarkson	Taffy Abel Arena	Recap
No scoring		First period	10:42 - Hugo Bélanger (Trombley, Torrey)
(Moger, Wetherill) Clayton Beddoes - 05:48 (unassisted) Doug Weight - 06:12 (Hendry, Harris) Paul Constantin - 06:51		Second period	16:39 - PP - Scott Thomas (Dubinsky, Henrich)
No scoring		Third period	06:43 - Mike Casselman (Tavi, Dubinsky); 13:45 - GW - Hugo Bélanger (Lapointe); 14:20 - Craig Conroy (M. Green); 19:19 - EN - Steve Dubinsky (Sanderson, Thomas); 19:51 - EN - Dave Trombley (Kozak)
(18 saves / 23 shots) Darrin Madeley		Goalie stats	Chris Rogles (12 saves / 15 shots); Jason Currie (27 saves / 27 shots)

March 23	Lake Superior State	6 – 2	Clarkson	Taffy Abel Arena	Recap
(Wetherill, Weight) Sandy Moger - 02:58		First period	00:11 - Mike Casselman (Conroy, Thomas)
(Dowd, Napierala) Mark Astley - PP - 01:50 (Dowd, Smith) Doug Weight - PP GW - 07:19		Second period	No scoring
(Barnes, Beddoes) Mark Astley - 09:40 (Weight) Jeff Napierala - 14:12 (Weight, Breslin) Jeff Napierala - PP - 18:13		Third period	05:01 - PP - Dave Trombley (Sanderson)
(21 saves / 23 shots) Darrin Madeley		Goalie stats	Chris Rogles (22 saves / 25 shots); Jason Currie (20 saves / 23 shots)

March 24	Lake Superior State	3 – 4	Clarkson	Taffy Abel Arena	Recap
(Weight) Jim Dowd - SH - 10:32 () Jim Dowd - PP - 18:10		First period	15:57 - PP - Mikko Tavi (Trombley, Tretowicz)
No scoring		Second period	00:41 - Scott Thomas (Casselman, Tretowicz); 03:43 - PP - Hugo Bélanger (Trombley, Casselman)
(Napierala, Miller) Jim Dowd - 06:35		Third period	00:24 - PP GW - Mark Green (Bélanger, Trombley)
(24 saves / 28 shots) Darrin Madeley (1 save / 1 shot) Brandon Reed		Goalie stats	Chris Rogles (34 saves / 37 shots)

Clarkson won series 2–1

==== (W2) Northern Michigan vs. (W6) Alaska-Anchorage ====
March 22	Northern Michigan	8 – 5	Alaska-Anchorage	Lakeview Arena	Recap
(Plandowski, Melone) Dallas Drake - 11:54		First period	No scoring
(Drake, Melone) Darryl Plandowski - PP - 08:07 (Szabo, Soukoroff) Dallas Drake - 09:41 (Drake, Melone) Tony Szabo - PP - 12:26 (unassisted) Tony Szabo - 19:02		Second period	03:32 - Dean Larson (Morris, O'Rear); 08:50 - Dean Trboyevich (Mayes, Millar); 19:35 - Lorne Knauft (unassisted)
(Beattie) Kevin Scott - GW - 07:34 (Szabo) Dallas Drake - 09:15 (Simpson) Kevin Scott - 12:58		Third period	15:13 - Garnet Deschamp (Larson, Kollman); 19:13 - Keith Morris (unassisted)
(19 saves / 24 shots) Bill Pye		Goalie stats	Paul Krake (41 saves / 49 shots)

March 23	Northern Michigan	5 – 3	Alaska-Anchorage	Lakeview Arena	Recap
(Melone, Beaufait) Phil Soukoroff - PP - 15:15		First period	18:08 - Keith Morris (unassisted)
(unassisted) Ed Ward - 00:44 (Soukoroff) Scott Beattie - 06:07		Second period	No scoring
(Beaufait, Carpenter) Geoff Simpson - GW - 04:09 (Beattie, Antos) Jim Hiller - 10:15		Third period	06:58 - PP - Jeff Batters (Kollman, Conn); 12:21 - SH - Jeff Batters (Mayes, Coulson)
(30 saves / 33 shots) Bill Pye		Goalie stats	Paul Krake (30 saves / 35 shots)

Northern Michigan won series 2–0

== Frozen Four ==
=== National Semifinal ===
==== (E1) Maine vs. (W2) Northern Michigan ====
March 28	Maine	3 – 5	Northern Michigan	Saint Paul Civic Center	Recap
(Beattie, Hiller) Brad Werenka - 02:29		First period	19:11 - SH - Jean-Yves Roy (Straub)
(Beattie, Melone) Jim Hiller - PP - 09:44 (Plandowski, Drake) Tony Szabo - PP - 11:04		Second period	00:47 - Jean-Yves Roy (Robitaille)
(Scott) Dallas Drake - GW - 16:47 (Antos) Darryl Plandowski - EN - 19:40		Third period	10:38 - PP - Jean-Yves Roy (Downey, Straub)
(33 saves / 37 shots) Mike Dunham		Goalie stats	Bill Pye (24 saves / 27 shots)

==== (E2) Boston University vs. (E4) Clarkson ====
March 28	Boston University	7 – 3	Clarkson	Saint Paul Civic Center	Recap
(Tkachuk) Tony Amonte - 05:15 (Ahola, Stefenelli) Tony Amonte - SH - 09:46 (Sacco, Mi. Bavis) Chris McCann - 13:12 (Koskimäki) Dave Tomlinson - GW - 15:51 (Dion, McEachern) Tony Amonte - 17:45		First period	00:31 - Mike Casselman (Lapointe, Conroy)
No scoring		Second period	06:48 - Scott Thomas (Casselman, Conroy)
(Tkachuk, Amonte) Shawn McEachern - 03:44 (Ma. Bavis) Doug Friedman - 11:59		Third period	08:52 - Ed Sabo (D. Green, Tavi)
(16 saves / 19 shots) Scott Cashman		Goalie stats	Chris Rogles (26 saves / 32 shots); Jason Currie (1 save / 2 shots)

=== National Championship ===
==== (W2) Northern Michigan vs. (E2) Boston University ====
March 30	Northern Michigan	8 – 7	3OT	Boston University	Saint Paul Civic Center	Recap

Scoring summary
Period	Team	Goal	Assist(s)	Time	Score
1st	BU	Ed Ronan	Tomlinson and Ahola	1:00	1–0 BU
1st	BU	David Sacco	McCann and Mi. Bavis	8:24	2–0 BU
1st	BU	Ed Ronan	Lachance and Tomlinson	9:26	3–0 BU
2nd	NMU	Dean Antos – PP	Werenka and Beattie	21:33	3–1 BU
2nd	NMU	Mark Beaufait	Melone and Soukoroff	25:24	3–2 BU
2nd	NMU	Scott Beattie	Melone and Scott	34:45	3–3
2nd	NMU	Darryl Plandowski	Frederick and Antos	35:39	4–3 NMU
2nd	NMU	Scott Beattie	unassisted	37:18	5–3 NMU
3rd	NMU	Scott Beattie	unassisted	43:08	6–3 NMU
3rd	BU	Dave Tomlinson	unassisted	45:59	6–4 NMU
3rd	NMU	Darryl Plandowski – PP	Soukoroff and Melone	48:24	7–4 NMU
3rd	BU	Tony Amonte	McEachern and Tkachuk	52:24	7–5 NMU
3rd	BU	Shawn McEachern	Amonte	54:51	7–6 NMU
3rd	BU	David Sacco – EA	Lachance and McEachern	59:21	7–7
3rd Overtime	NMU	Darryl Plandowski – GW	Beaufait and Antos	81:57	8–7 NMU
Penalty summary
Period	Team	Player	Penalty	Time	PIM
1st	NMU	Ed Ward	Checking from behind	13:25	2:00
1st	BU	Peter Ahola	High-sticking	20:00	2:00
2nd	NMU	Dave Shyiak	High-sticking	22:29	2:00
2nd	BU	Keith Tkachuk	Elbowing	22:44	2:00
2nd	BU	John Bradley	Tripping (served by Keith Tkachuk)	28:24	2:00
3rd	NMU	Darryl Plandowski	Interference	40:51	2:00
3rd	BU	Doug Friedman	Charging	46:58	2:00
1st Overtime	none				
2nd Overtime	BU	Tony Amonte	Slashing	79:31	2:00
2nd Overtime	NMU	Ed Ward	Slashing	79:31	2:00
3rd Overtime	none				

Shots by period
Team	1	2	3	OT	2OT	3OT	Total
Boston University	11	7	15	2	5	0	40
Northern Michigan	7	16	12	8	3	1	47

Goaltenders
Team	Name	Saves	Goals against	Time on ice
NMU	Bill Pye	33	7	81:57
BU	John Bradley	18	5	37:18
BU	Scott Cashman	21	3	44:33

== All-Tournament Team ==
- G: Bill Pye (Northern Michigan)
- D: Lou Melone (Northern Michigan)
- D: Brad Werenka (Northern Michigan)
- F: Tony Amonte (Boston University)
- F: Scott Beattie* (Northern Michigan)
- F: Jean-Yves Roy (Maine)

* Most Outstanding Player(s)
