= Ed Ward (ice hockey) =

Canadian ice hockey player

- Born: November 10, 1969 (age 56) Edmonton, Alberta, Canada
- Height: 6 ft 3 in (191 cm)
- Weight: 190 lb (86 kg; 13 st 8 lb)
- Position: Right wing
- Shot: Right
- Played for: Quebec Nordiques; Calgary Flames; Atlanta Thrashers; Mighty Ducks of Anaheim; New Jersey Devils
- NHL draft: 108th overall, 1988; Quebec Nordiques
- Playing career: 1991–2002

Edward J. Ward (born November 10, 1969) is a Canadian former professional ice hockey player. Ward played 278 games for five teams.

== Playing career ==
Ward was drafted by the Quebec Nordiques in the sixth round, 108th overall in the 1988 NHL entry draft. Ward chose to play NCAA hockey for Northern Michigan University before turning pro. He helped lead NMU to the 1991 NCAA title. In 1991, he began his pro career with the Greensboro Monarchs of the East Coast Hockey League, eventually cracking the Nordiques roster in 1993–94. Ward played only seven games with the Nords before being sent to the Calgary Flames. Ward spent five years bouncing between the Flames, and their AHL affiliate the Saint John Flames, then played parts of seasons with the Atlanta Thrashers, Mighty Ducks of Anaheim and the New Jersey Devils. Ward finished his career in Sweden, playing one season with Timrå IK in 2001–02 before retiring.

== Career statistics ==
=== Regular season and playoffs ===
			Regular season					Playoffs
Season	Team	League	GP	G	A	Pts	PIM	GP	G	A	Pts	PIM
1986–87	Sherwood Park Crusaders	AJHL	60	18	28	46	272	—	—	—	—	—
1987–88	Northern Michigan University	WCHA	25	0	2	2	40	—	—	—	—	—
1988–89	Northern Michigan University	WCHA	42	5	15	20	36	—	—	—	—	—
1989–90	Northern Michigan University	WCHA	39	5	11	16	77	—	—	—	—	—
1990–91	Northern Michigan University	WCHA	46	13	18	31	109	—	—	—	—	—
1991–92	Greensboro Monarchs	ECHL	12	4	8	12	12	—	—	—	—	—
1991–92	Halifax Citadels	AHL	51	7	11	18	65	—	—	—	—	—
1992–93	Halifax Citadels	AHL	70	13	19	32	56	—	—	—	—	—
1993–94	Cornwall Aces	AHL	60	12	30	42	65	12	1	3	4	14
1993–94	Quebec Nordiques	NHL	7	1	0	1	5	—	—	—	—	—
1994–95	Cornwall Aces	AHL	56	10	14	24	118	—	—	—	—	—
1994–95	Saint John Flames	AHL	11	4	5	9	20	5	1	0	1	10
1994–95	Calgary Flames	NHL	2	1	1	2	2	—	—	—	—	—
1995–96	Saint John Flames	AHL	12	1	2	3	45	16	4	4	8	27
1995–96	Calgary Flames	NHL	41	3	5	8	44	—	—	—	—	—
1996–97	Calgary Flames	NHL	40	5	8	13	49	—	—	—	—	—
1996–97	Detroit Vipers	IHL	31	7	6	13	45	—	—	—	—	—
1996–97	Saint John Flames	AHL	1	0	0	0	0	—	—	—	—	—
1997–98	Calgary Flames	NHL	64	4	5	9	122	—	—	—	—	—
1998–99	Calgary Flames	NHL	68	3	5	8	67	—	—	—	—	—
1999–00	Atlanta Thrashers	NHL	44	5	1	6	44	—	—	—	—	—
1999–00	Mighty Ducks of Anaheim	NHL	8	1	0	1	15	—	—	—	—	—
2000–01	Albany River Rats	AHL	65	14	19	33	71	—	—	—	—	—
2000–01	New Jersey Devils	NHL	4	0	1	1	6	—	—	—	—	—
2001–02	Timrå IK	SEL	34	3	2	5	64	—	—	—	—	—
AHL totals			326	61	100	161	440	33	6	7	13	51
NHL totals			278	23	26	49	354	—	—	—	—	—
