= Cam Stewart (ice hockey) =

Canadian ice hockey player and coach

- Born: September 18, 1971 (age 54) Kitchener, Ontario, Canada
- Height: 5 ft 11 in (180 cm)
- Weight: 196 lb (89 kg; 14 st 0 lb)
- Position: Left wing
- Shot: Left
- Played for: Boston Bruins; Florida Panthers; Minnesota Wild
- NHL draft: 63rd Overall, 1990; Boston Bruins
- Playing career: 1993–2001

Cameron G. Stewart (born September 18, 1971) is a Canadian professional ice hockey coach and former player. He played in the National Hockey League with the Boston Bruins, Florida Panthers, and Minnesota Wild between 1993 and 2001.

== Playing career ==
Stewart played three seasons of college hockey at the University of Michigan and was drafted 63rd overall by the Boston Bruins in the 1990 NHL draft. He started his NHL career with the Bruins in 1993. Stewart also played with the Florida Panthers, and was an original member of the expansion Minnesota Wild.

In the minor leagues, Stewart played for the Providence Bruins (AHL), Cincinnati Cyclones (IHL), and Houston Aeros (IHL). He helped the Houston Aeros win a Turner Cup in the 1998–1999 season.

== Post-playing career ==
Stewart retired from ice hockey due to problems he was experiencing from a concussion that he received while playing. Stewart went on to be an assistant coach/front-office advisor with the Houston Aeros (now the Iowa Wild). He later became head coach of the St. Mikes Buzzers in the OPJHL.

Stewart is currently an Ontario-based agent with the KO Sports Agency, overseeing player development.

== Career statistics ==
=== Regular season and playoffs ===
			Regular season					Playoffs
Season	Team	League	GP	G	A	Pts	PIM	GP	G	A	Pts	PIM
1987–88	Woolwich Rangers	WMHA	21	25	32	57	65	—	—	—	—	—
1988–89	Elmira Sugar Kings	MWJHL	43	38	50	88	138	—	—	—	—	—
1989–90	Elmira Sugar Kings	MWJHL	46	43	95	138	174	—	—	—	—	—
1990–91	University of Michigan	CCHA	44	8	24	32	122	—	—	—	—	—
1991–92	University of Michigan	CCHA	44	13	15	28	106	—	—	—	—	—
1992–93	University of Michigan	CCHA	39	20	38	58	69	—	—	—	—	—
1994–94	Providence Bruins	AHL	14	3	2	5	5	—	—	—	—	—
1993–94	Boston Bruins	NHL	57	3	6	9	66	8	0	3	3	7
1994–95	Providence Bruins	AHL	31	13	11	24	38	9	2	5	7	0
1994–95	Boston Bruins	NHL	5	0	0	0	2	—	—	—	—	—
1995–96	Providence Bruins	AHL	54	17	25	42	39	—	—	—	—	—
1995–96	Boston Bruins	NHL	6	0	0	0	0	5	1	0	1	2
1996–97	Cincinnati Cyclones	IHL	7	3	2	5	8	1	0	0	0	0
1996–97	Providence Bruins	AHL	18	4	3	7	37	—	—	—	—	—
1996–97	Boston Bruins	NHL	15	0	1	1	4	—	—	—	—	—
1997–98	Houston Aeros	IHL	63	18	27	45	51	4	0	1	1	8
1998–99	Houston Aeros	IHL	61	36	26	62	75	19	10	5	15	26
1999–00	Florida Panthers	NHL	65	9	7	16	30	—	—	—	—	—
2000–01	Minnesota Wild	NHL	54	4	9	13	18	—	—	—	—	—
NHL totals			202	16	23	39	120	13	1	3	4	9
