= Tom Dion =

American ice hockey player (born 1969)

- Born: April 22, 1969 (age 57) Massena, New York, USA
- Height: 5 ft 11 in (180 cm)
- Weight: 182 lb (83 kg; 13 st 0 lb)
- Position: Defenseman
- Shot: Right
- Played for: Boston University; Wheeling Thunderbirds
- Playing career: 1987–1993

Thomas Dion is an American retired ice hockey defenseman who was an All-American for Boston University.

== Career ==
Dion was a consistent producer from the blueline for the Terriers for parts of five seasons. During his first two years with the team, Dion led the defense in scoring but BU didn't have much success team-wise. He played on Team USA at the 1989 World Junior Championships along with future NHL stars like Jeremy Roenick and Mike Modano. Despite the talent on the team, the US finished 5th with a .500 record.

During what was to be his junior season, Dion was felled by a season-ending injury after just 3 games and sat out the remainder of the year with a medical redshirt. In his absence, the Terriers went on a surprising run in the 1990 NCAA Tournament, reaching the Frozen Four. When he returned, the Terriers improved upon their record from the year before and won the Hockey East championship. The Terriers received the second eastern seed and dominated in their first three national tournament games to make the 1991 NCAA championship game. Dion had led a defense that had surrendered just 5 goals to that point so when the team took a 3–0 lead after the first period everything pointed to BU winning the title. Unfortunately for Dion, Northern Michigan had one of the strongest offenses in NCAA history and the Wildcats scored 6 goals in just over a period to take a commanding lead. Boston University charged back and eventually tied the game, forcing overtime. Three extra periods were needed but in the end BU ended up on the wrong side of the score and Dion was denied a championship.

For his senior season, Dion was named team captain and led the Terriers to an excellent record in the regular season. Dion was one of the key contributors in BU's third consecutive Beanpot championship. With all signs pointing to the Terriers competing for another championship, the team collapsed in the playoffs. The Terriers were beaten by long-time rival Boston College in the conference quarterfinals, causing the team to receive a 4th-seed for the NCAA Tournament. Boston University received a poor draw for the first round and lost to Michigan State in their only game.

Dion signed a professional contract after the season, playing the following year with the Wheeling Thunderbirds. Despite posting good numbers for a first-year pro, he decided to retire after the year.

== Statistics ==
=== Regular season and playoffs ===
			Regular Season					Playoffs
Season	Team	League	GP	G	A	Pts	PIM	GP	G	A	Pts	PIM
1987–88	Boston University	Hockey East	34	8	16	24	40	—	—	—	—	—
1988–89	Boston University	Hockey East	33	3	15	18	40	—	—	—	—	—
1989–90	Boston University	Hockey East	3	0	0	0	4	—	—	—	—	—
1990–91	Boston University	Hockey East	40	6	14	20	14	—	—	—	—	—
1991–92	Boston University	Hockey East	35	5	12	17	22	—	—	—	—	—
1992–93	Wheeling Thunderbirds	ECHL	60	5	17	22	76	—	—	—	—	—
NCAA totals			145	22	57	79	132	—	—	—	—	—

=== International ===
Year	Team	Event	Result	GP	G	A	Pts	PIM
1989	United States	WJC	5th	7	0	1	1	0

== Awards and honors ==
Award	Year
All-Hockey East First Team	1991–92
AHCA East Second-Team All-American	1991–92
