= Les Kuntar =

American ice hockey player (born 1969)

- Born: July 28, 1969 (age 56); Elma, New York, U.S.
- Height: 6 ft 2 in (188 cm)
- Weight: 195 lb (88 kg; 13 st 13 lb)
- Position: Goaltender
- Caught: Left
- Played for: Montreal Canadiens
- National team: United States
- NHL draft: 122nd overall, 1987; Montreal Canadiens
- Playing career: 1991–1997

Leslie Stephen Kuntar (born July 28, 1969) is an American former professional ice hockey player. He played six games in the National Hockey League with the Montreal Canadiens during the 1993–94 season. The rest of his career, which lasted from 1991 to 1997, was spent in the minor leagues. Before his professional career, Kuntar played for St. Lawrence University. Internationally Kuntar played for the American national team at the 1994 World Championships.

== Post-playing career ==
Kuntar has resided in Western New York since he retired from professional hockey. He was one of the goaltenders to take part in the 2017 "11 Day Power Play", an attempt at the longest ice hockey game on record, and is an occasional member of the Buffalo Sabres Alumni Hockey Team.

== Career statistics ==
=== Regular season and playoffs ===
			Regular season									Playoffs
Season	Team	League	GP	W	L	T	MIN	GA	SO	GAA	SV%	GP	W	L	MIN	GA	SO	GAA	SV%
1986–87	Nichols School	HS-NY	22	—	—	—	1585	56	3	2.12	—	—	—	—	—	—	—	—	—
1987–88	St. Lawrence University	ECAC	10	6	1	0	488	27	0	3.32	—	—	—	—	—	—	—	—	—
1988–89	St. Lawrence University	ECAC	14	11	2	0	786	31	0	2.37	.928	—	—	—	—	—	—	—	—
1989–90	St. Lawrence University	ECAC	20	7	11	1	1136	80	0	4.23	.885	—	—	—	—	—	—	—	—
1990–91	St. Lawrence University	ECAC	33	19	11	1	1797	97	1	3.24	.895	—	—	—	—	—	—	—	—
1991–92	Fredericton Canadiens	AHL	11	7	3	0	638	26	0	2.45	.890	—	—	—	—	—	—	—	—
1991–92	American National Team	Intl	13	3	5	3	725	57	0	4.72	—	—	—	—	—	—	—	—	—
1992–93	Fredericton Canadiens	AHL	42	16	14	7	2315	130	0	3.37	.889	1	0	1	64	6	0	5.63	—
1993–94	Montreal Canadiens	NHL	6	2	2	0	302	16	0	3.18	.877	—	—	—	—	—	—	—	—
1993–94	Fredericton Canadiens	AHL	34	10	17	3	1804	109	1	3.62	.880	—	—	—	—	—	—	—	—
1994–95	Worcester IceCats	AHL	24	6	10	5	1241	77	2	3.72	.875	—	—	—	—	—	—	—	—
1994–95	Hershey Bears	AHL	32	15	13	2	1802	89	0	2.96	.908	2	0	1	70	5	0	4.28	.868
1995–96	Hershey Bears	AHL	20	7	8	2	1020	71	0	4.18	.877	—	—	—	—	—	—	—	—
1995–96	Fort Wayne Komets	IHL	8	2	3	1	387	26	1	4.03	.893	—	—	—	—	—	—	—	—
1996–97	Rochester Americans	AHL	21	6	9	3	1052	60	0	3.42	.888	—	—	—	—	—	—	—	—
1996–97	Pensacola Ice Pilots	ECHL	4	2	2	0	220	13	0	3.55	.904	—	—	—	—	—	—	—	—
1996–97	Cleveland Lumberjacks	IHL	1	1	0	0	60	4	0	4.00	.900	—	—	—	—	—	—	—	—
1996–97	Utah Grizzlies	IHL	3	1	0	0	87	1	0	0.69	.974	—	—	—	—	—	—	—	—
NHL totals			6	2	2	0	302	16	0	3.18	.877	—	—	—	—	—	—	—	—

=== International ===
Year	Team	Event	GP	W	L	T	MIN	GA	SO	GAA	SV%
1994	United States	WC	4	0	2	0	135	11	0	4.89	.866
Senior totals			4	0	2	0	135	11	0	4.89	.866

== Awards and honors ==
Award	Year
All-ECAC Hockey First Team	1990–91
AHCA East First-Team All-American	1990–91
