= Jean-Yves Roy (ice hockey) =

Canadian ice hockey player

- Born: February 17, 1969 (age 56) Rosemère, Quebec, Canada
- Height: 5 ft 10 in (178 cm)
- Weight: 180 lb (82 kg; 12 st 12 lb)
- Position: Right Wing
- Shot: Left
- Played for: New York Rangers; Ottawa Senators; Boston Bruins
- National team: Canada
- NHL draft: Undrafted
- Playing career: 1994–2006

Jean-Yves Roy (born February 17, 1969) is a Canadian former professional ice hockey player.

== Career ==
Roy was a member of the Canadian 1994 Winter Olympics ice hockey team, winning a silver medal. He also played professionally in the National Hockey League with the New York Rangers, Ottawa Senators, and Boston Bruins. Roy coaches high school hockey for Notre Dame Academy in Hingham, Massachusetts, and serves as an official for the Hockey East Association.

== Awards and honors ==
| Award | Year |
|---|---|
| All-Hockey East Rookie Team | 1989–90 |
| AHCA East Second-Team All-American | 1989–90 |
| Hockey East All-Tournament Team | 1990 |
| All-Hockey East First Team | 1990–91 |
| AHCA East First-Team All-American | 1990–91 |
| All-NCAA All-Tournament Team | 1991 |
| All-Hockey East Second Team | 1991–92 |
| AHCA East First-Team All-American | 1991–92 |

== Career statistics ==
=== Regular season and playoffs ===
| | | | Regular season | | | | | Playoffs |
| Season | Team | League | GP | G | A | Pts | PIM | GP | G | A | Pts | PIM |
|---|---|---|---|---|---|---|---|---|---|---|---|---|
| 1984–85 | Laval Insulaires | QMAAA | 1 | 0 | 0 | 0 | 0 | — | — | — | — | — |
| 1985–86 | Laval Régents | QMAAA | 42 | 20 | 27 | 47 | 17 | 7 | 3 | 6 | 9 | 12 |
| 1989–90 | University of Maine | HE | 46 | 39 | 26 | 65 | 52 | — | — | — | — | — |
| 1990–91 | University of Maine | HE | 43 | 37 | 45 | 82 | 26 | — | — | — | — | — |
| 1991–92 | University of Maine | HE | 35 | 32 | 24 | 56 | 62 | — | — | — | — | — |
| 1991–92 | Canada | Intl | 13 | 10 | 4 | 14 | 6 | — | — | — | — | — |
| 1992–93 | Binghamton Rangers | AHL | 49 | 13 | 15 | 28 | 21 | 14 | 5 | 2 | 7 | 4 |
| 1992–93 | Canada | Intl | 23 | 9 | 6 | 15 | 35 | — | — | — | — | — |
| 1993–94 | Binghamton Rangers | AHL | 65 | 42 | 24 | 66 | 33 | — | — | — | — | — |
| 1993–94 | Canada | Intl | 14 | 4 | 2 | 6 | 2 | — | — | — | — | — |
| 1994–95 | Binghamton Rangers | AHL | 67 | 41 | 36 | 77 | 28 | 11 | 4 | 6 | 10 | 12 |
| 1994–95 | New York Rangers | NHL | 3 | 1 | 0 | 1 | 2 | — | — | — | — | — |
| 1995–96 | Ottawa Senators | NHL | 4 | 1 | 1 | 2 | 2 | — | — | — | — | — |
| 1995–96 | P.E.I. Senators | AHL | 67 | 40 | 55 | 95 | 64 | 5 | 4 | 9 | 13 | 6 |
| 1996–97 | Boston Bruins | NHL | 52 | 10 | 15 | 25 | 22 | — | — | — | — | — |
| 1996–97 | Providence Bruins | AHL | 27 | 9 | 16 | 25 | 30 | 10 | 2 | 7 | 9 | 2 |
| 1997–98 | Boston Bruins | NHL | 2 | 0 | 0 | 0 | 0 | — | — | — | — | — |
| 1997–98 | Providence Bruins | AHL | 65 | 28 | 34 | 62 | 60 | — | — | — | — | — |
| 1998–99 | EC VSV | Alp | 29 | 25 | 27 | 52 | 26 | — | — | — | — | — |
| 1998–99 | EC VSV | AUT | 23 | 13 | 20 | 33 | 20 | — | — | — | — | — |
| 1998–99 | Canada | Intl | 5 | 4 | 3 | 7 | 8 | — | — | — | — | — |
| 1999–2000 | Kölner Haie | DEL | 56 | 22 | 21 | 43 | 53 | 10 | 2 | 4 | 6 | 8 |
| 2000–01 | HC Fribourg–Gottéron | NLA | 45 | 29 | 19 | 48 | 55 | 5 | 4 | 2 | 6 | 0 |
| 2001–02 | HC Fribourg–Gottéron | NLA | 40 | 12 | 12 | 24 | 55 | 2 | 1 | 0 | 1 | 25 |
| 2002–03 | HC Fribourg–Gottéron | NLA | 41 | 14 | 15 | 29 | 47 | — | — | — | — | — |
| 2003–04 | Kölner Haie | DEL | 50 | 13 | 33 | 46 | 36 | 6 | 0 | 3 | 3 | 6 |
| 2004–05 | Kölner Haie | DEL | 58 | 21 | 24 | 45 | 65 | 7 | 2 | 2 | 4 | 2 |
| 2005–06 | Kölner Haie | DEL | 45 | 10 | 18 | 28 | 8 | — | — | — | — | — |
| AHL totals | | | 340 | 173 | 180 | 353 | 236 | 40 | 15 | 24 | 39 | 24 |
| NHL totals | | | 61 | 12 | 16 | 28 | 26 | — | — | — | — | — |
| DEL totals | | | 209 | 66 | 96 | 162 | 162 | 23 | 4 | 9 | 13 | 16 |

=== International ===
| Year | Team | Event | GP | G | A | Pts | PIM |
|---|---|---|---|---|---|---|---|
| 1994 | Canada | OG | 8 | 1 | 0 | 1 | 0 |
| Senior totals | | | 8 | 1 | 0 | 1 | 0 |
