= Doug Friedman =

American ice hockey player (born 1971)

- Born: September 1, 1971 (age 54) Greenwich, Connecticut, U.S.
- Height: 6 ft 1 in (185 cm)
- Weight: 205 lb (93 kg; 14 st 9 lb)
- Position: Winger
- Shot: Left
- Played for: Edmonton Oilers; Nashville Predators
- NHL draft: 222nd overall, 1991; Quebec Nordiques
- Playing career: 1994–2001

Doug Friedman (born September 1, 1971) is an American former professional ice hockey player who played in the American Hockey League (AHL) with two brief stints in the National Hockey League (NHL). Known as an enforcer, Friedman racked up 1,500 penalty minutes in just over 500 games in the AHL/IHL. He played four years with Boston University in NCAA Division I before beginning his professional career with the Cornwall Aces of the AHL. He was the one player (Note: One player was selected from each of the 26 teams that existed at the time of the draft.) taken from Edmonton in the 1998 NHL Expansion Draft. He finished his career with the Worcester IceCats of the AHL in 2001.

== Career ==
Friedman was selected in the eleventh round of the 1991 NHL entry draft, 222nd overall, by the Quebec Nordiques. During the 1993–94 NCAA Division I men's ice hockey season Friedman was voted captain of the Terriers.While at Boston University Friedman was part of teams that won multiple Hockey East Championships, Beanpot Titles, and made the NCAA Final Four three of his four years at BU. Friedman ended his college career with over 100 points, and was recognized as New England Defensive Forward of the Year. Friedman had two NHL stints, in the 1997–98 and 1998–99 with the Edmonton Oilers and Nashville Predators, primarily as an enforcer.

Following his playing career, Friedman transitioned into coaching. From 2014 to 2018, Friedman was the athletic director of the college-preparatory school Kents Hill and coached the school's ice hockey team. In 2018, Friedman was named the head coach of the United States Premier Hockey League (USPHL) team Twin City Thunder based in Auburn, Maine, and later became the head coach of their National Collegiate Development Conference (NCDC) team. In 2021 he joined his alma mater as Director of Hockey at Boston University. As a member of the BU staff, they have won a Hockey East Championship, a Beanpot Championship, and made the NCAA Final Four two of his three years there.

== Personal life ==
Friedman grew-up in Cape Elizabeth, Maine. He is married with three children and lives in Maine.

== Career statistics ==
			Regular season					Playoffs
Season	Team	League	GP	G	A	Pts	PIM	GP	G	A	Pts	PIM
1990–91	Boston University	HE	36	6	6	12	37	—	—	—	—	—
1991–92	Boston University	HE	35	11	8	19	42	—	—	—	—	—
1992–93	Boston University	HE	38	17	24	41	62	—	—	—	—	—
1993–94	Boston University	HE	41	9	23	32	110	—	—	—	—	—
1994–95	Cornwall Aces	AHL	55	6	9	15	56	3	0	0	0	0
1995–96	Cornwall Aces	AHL	80	12	22	34	178	8	1	1	2	17
1996–97	Hershey Bears	AHL	61	12	21	33	245	23	6	9	15	49
1997–98	Hamilton Bulldogs	AHL	55	19	27	46	235	9	4	4	8	40
1997–98	Edmonton Oilers	NHL	16	0	0	0	20	—	—	—	—	—
1998–99	Nashville Predators	NHL	2	0	1	1	14	—	—	—	—	—
1998–99	Milwaukee Admirals	IHL	69	26	25	51	251	2	1	2	3	8
1999–00	Kentucky Thoroughblades	AHL	73	13	23	36	237	9	1	3	4	35
2000–01	Worcester IceCats	AHL	41	9	10	19	78	8	2	0	2	22
NHL totals			18	0	1	1	34	—	—	—	—	—
AHL/IHL totals			434	97	137	234	1,280	62	15	19	34	181
