= Mike Casselman =

Canadian ice hockey player (born 1968)

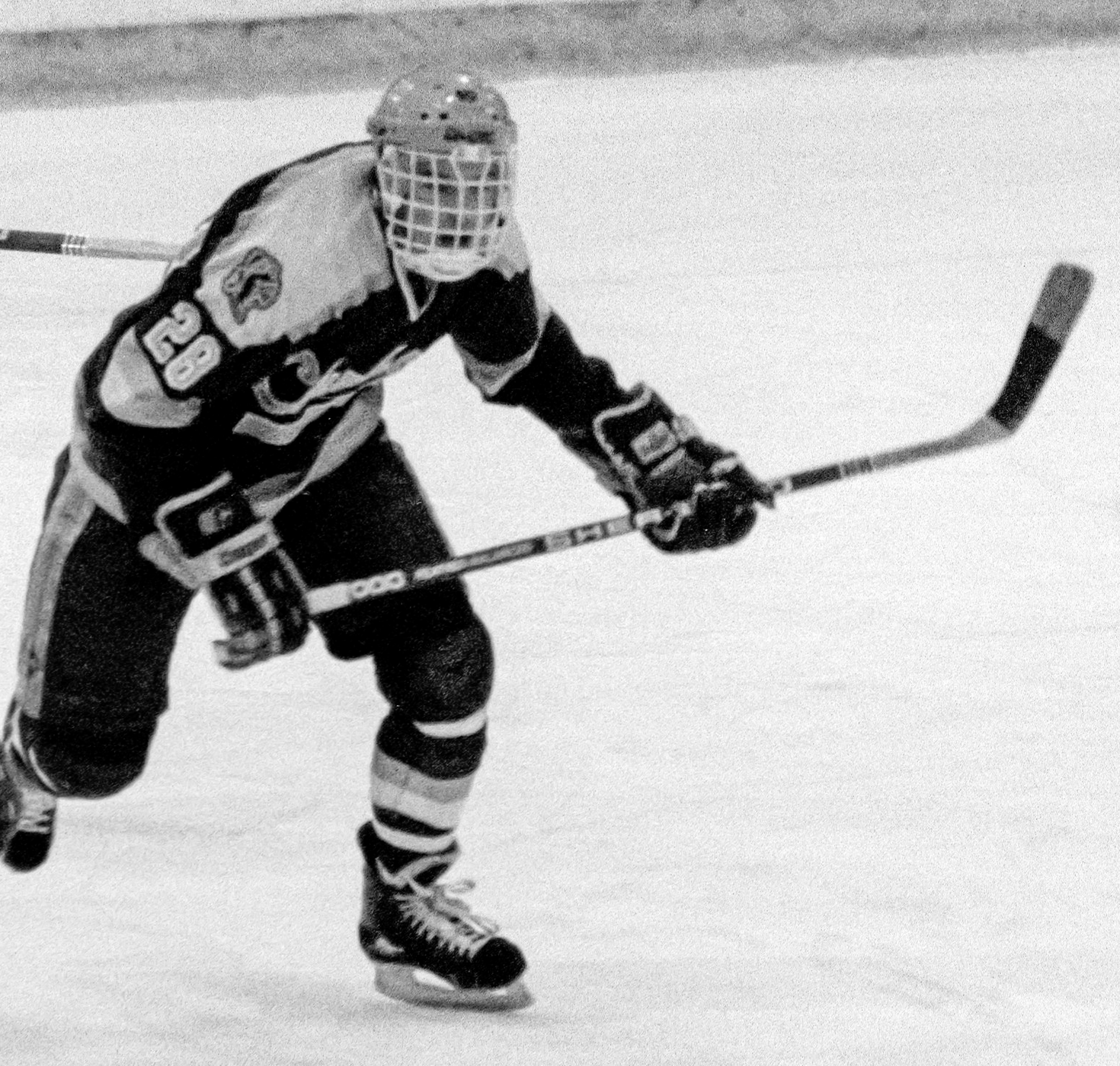
- Casselman at Clarkson in 1987
- Born: August 23, 1968 (age 56); Morrisburg, Ontario, Canada
- Height: 5 ft 11 in (180 cm)
- Weight: 185 lb (84 kg; 13 st 3 lb)
- Position: Left wing
- Shot: Left
- Played for: Florida Panthers
- NHL draft: 1990 NHL Supplemental Draft; Detroit Red Wings
- Playing career: 1991–2004

Michael Steven Casselman (born August 23, 1968) is a Canadian former professional ice hockey left wing and former AHL All-Star. He was drafted out of Clarkson University by the Detroit Red Wings in the 1990 NHL Supplemental Draft. He played three games in the National Hockey League with the Florida Panthers in the 1995–96 season, going scoreless.

== Career statistics ==
			Regular season					Playoffs
Season	Team	League	GP	G	A	Pts	PIM	GP	G	A	Pts	PIM
1987–88	Clarkson University	NCAA	24	4	1	5	12	—	—	—	—	—
1988–89	Clarkson University	NCAA	31	3	14	17	36	—	—	—	—	—
1989–90	Clarkson University	NCAA	34	22	21	43	69	—	—	—	—	—
1990–91	Clarkson University	NCAA	40	19	35	54	44	—	—	—	—	—
1991–92	Toledo Storm	ECHL	61	39	60	99	83	5	0	1	1	6
1991–92	Adirondack Red Wings	AHL	1	0	0	0	0	—	—	—	—	—
1992–93	Adirondack Red Wings	AHL	60	12	19	31	27	8	3	3	6	0
1992–93	Toledo Storm	ECHL	3	0	1	1	2	—	—	—	—	—
1993–94	Adirondack Red Wings	AHL	77	17	38	55	34	12	2	4	6	10
1994–95	Adirondack Red Wings	AHL	60	17	43	60	42	4	0	0	0	2
1995–96	Florida Panthers	NHL	3	0	0	0	0	—	—	—	—	—
1995–96	Carolina Monarchs	AHL	70	34	68	102	46	—	—	—	—	—
1996–97	Cincinnati Cyclones	IHL	68	30	34	64	54	3	1	0	1	2
1997–98	Cincinnati Cyclones	IHL	55	19	28	47	44	—	—	—	—	—
1997–98	Rochester Americans	AHL	25	8	7	15	14	4	1	1	2	2
1998–99	EV Landshut	DEL	49	20	29	49	64	3	0	1	1	0
1999–00	Munich Barons	DEL	54	14	29	43	44	12	4	8	12	4
2000–01	Hannover Scorpions	DEL	57	12	32	44	76	6	1	2	3	6
2001–02	Moskitos Essen	DEL	57	9	23	32	38	—	—	—	—	—
2002–03	Cincinnati Cyclones	ECHL	61	16	37	53	64	15	3	11	14	12
2003–04	Cincinnati Cyclones	ECHL	19	4	5	9	6	—	—	—	—	—
NHL totals			3	0	0	0	0	—	—	—	—	—
AHL totals			293	88	175	263	163	28	6	8	14	14
