= Ted Crowley =

American ice hockey player

- Born: May 3, 1970 (age 55) Concord, Massachusetts, U.S.
- Height: 6 ft 2 in (188 cm)
- Weight: 210 lb (95 kg; 15 st 0 lb)
- Position: Defense
- Shot: Right
- Played for: Hartford Whalers; Colorado Avalanche; New York Islanders; Kassel Huskies; Essen Mosquitoes; Hamburg Freezers
- National team: United States
- NHL draft: 69th overall, 1988; Toronto Maple Leafs
- Playing career: 1991–2005

Edward J. Crowley (born May 3, 1970) is an American former professional ice hockey player. He was drafted in 1988 by the Toronto Maple Leafs in the 4th round, 69th overall. Crowley was born in Concord, Massachusetts, but grew up in Boxborough, Massachusetts.

== Playing career ==
Crowley played 21 games for the Hartford Whalers during the 1993–94 NHL season. He was signed as a free agent by the Colorado Avalanche in August 1998 and played 7 games for the Avalanche. He was traded on December 15, 1998, to the New York Islanders, where he played 6 games.

== Career statistics ==
=== Regular season and playoffs ===
			Regular season					Playoffs
Season	Team	League	GP	G	A	Pts	PIM	GP	G	A	Pts	PIM
1987–88	Lawrence Academy	HS-Prep	23	11	23	34	—	—	—	—	—	—
1987–88	Lawrence Academy	HS-Prep	23	12	24	36	—	—	—	—	—	—
1989–90	Boston College	HE	39	7	24	31	34	—	—	—	—	—
1990–91	Boston College	HE	39	12	24	36	61	—	—	—	—	—
1991–92	St. John's Maple Leafs	AHL	29	5	4	9	33	10	3	1	4	11
1991–92	United States National Team	Intl	42	6	7	13	65	—	—	—	—	—
1992–93	St. John's Maple Leafs	AHL	79	19	38	57	41	9	2	2	4	4
1993–94	Hartford Whalers	NHL	21	1	2	3	10	—	—	—	—	—
1993–94	United States National Team	Intl	48	9	13	22	80	—	—	—	—	—
1994–95	Chicago Wolves	IHL	53	8	23	31	68	—	—	—	—	—
1994–95	Houston Aeros	IHL	23	4	9	13	35	3	0	1	1	0
1995–96	Providence Bruins	AHL	72	12	30	42	47	4	1	2	3	2
1996–97	Cincinnati Cyclones	IHL	39	9	9	18	24	—	—	—	—	—
1996–97	Phoenix Roadrunners	IHL	30	5	8	13	21	—	—	—	—	—
1997–98	Springfield Falcons	AHL	78	14	35	49	55	4	1	1	2	2
1998–99	Hershey Bears	AHL	18	1	5	6	27	—	—	—	—	—
1998–99	Colorado Avalanche	NHL	7	0	1	1	2	—	—	—	—	—
1998–99	New York Islanders	NHL	6	1	1	2	0	—	—	—	—	—
1998–99	Lowell Lock Monsters	AHL	41	3	22	25	51	3	0	0	0	6
1999–00	Cleveland Lumberjacks	IHL	61	9	20	29	94	—	—	—	—	—
1999–00	Utah Grizzlies	IHL	16	3	2	5	16	5	1	1	2	12
2000–01	Kassel Huskies	DEL	60	11	29	40	64	7	0	2	2	26
2001–02	Essen Mosquitoes	DEL	56	10	21	31	62	—	—	—	—	—
2002–03	Hamburg Freezers	DEL	52	6	12	18	48	5	3	3	6	4
2003–04	Kassel Huskies	DEL	50	7	11	18	85	—	—	—	—	—
2004–05	Memphis Riverkings	CHL	25	14	29	43	25	—	—	—	—	—
AHL totals			317	54	134	188	254	30	7	6	13	25
NHL totals			34	2	4	6	12	—	—	—	—	—
IHL totals			222	38	71	109	258	8	1	2	3	12

=== International ===
Year	Team	Event	GP	G	A	Pts	PIM
1988	United States	WJC	7	0	1	1	0
1989	United States	WJC	7	1	1	2	0
1990	United States	WJC	7	1	4	5	6
1994	United States	OG	8	0	2	2	8
Junior totals			21	2	6	8	6
Senior totals			8	0	2	2	8

== Awards and honors ==
Award	Year
College
All-Hockey East Rookie Team	1989–90
All-Hockey East First Team	1990–91
AHCA East Second-Team All-American	1990–91
