= David Roberts (ice hockey) =

American ice hockey player (born 1970)

- Born: May 28, 1970 (age 54); Alameda, California, U.S.
- Height: 6 ft 0 in (183 cm)
- Weight: 185 lb (84 kg; 13 st 3 lb)
- Position: Left wing
- Shot: Left
- Played for: St. Louis Blues; Edmonton Oilers; Vancouver Canucks; Eisbären Berlin; EV Zug
- National team: United States
- NHL draft: 114th overall, 1989; St. Louis Blues
- Playing career: 1993–2004

David Lance Roberts (born May 28, 1970) is an American former professional ice hockey forward. He is the son of former NHL player Doug Roberts.

== Early life ==
Roberts was born in Alameda, California, when his father, Doug was a member of the California Golden Seals.

As a youth growing up in Old Lyme, Connecticut, Roberts played in the 1981, 1982 and 1983 Quebec International Pee-Wee Hockey Tournaments with a minor ice hockey team from Middlesex County, Connecticut.

Roberts played prep school hockey at Avon Old Farms and college hockey at the University of Michigan.

== Career ==
Roberts started his NHL career with the St. Louis Blues in 1994 after playing for the US national hockey team in the 1994 Winter Olympics. He also played with the Edmonton Oilers and Vancouver Canucks.

He also played for the Syracuse Crunch (AHL), Worcester IceCats (AHL), Peoria Rivermen (IHL), Michigan K-Wings (IHL), Grand Rapids Griffins (IHL), Eisbären Berlin in Germany's Deutsche Eishockey Liga, and EV Zug in Switzerland's Nationalliga A.

== Career statistics ==
=== Regular season and playoffs ===
			Regular season					Playoffs
Season	Team	League	GP	G	A	Pts	PIM	GP	G	A	Pts	PIM
1986–87	Avon Old Farms	HS-Prep	17	6	9	15		—	—	—	—	—
1987–88	Avon Old Farms	HS-Prep	25	18	39	57		—	—	—	—	—
1988–89	Avon Old Farms	HS-Prep	25	28	48	76		—	—	—	—	—
1989–90	University of Michigan	CCHA	42	21	32	53	46	—	—	—	—	—
1990–91	University of Michigan	CCHA	43	26	45	71	44	—	—	—	—	—
1991–92	University of Michigan	CCHA	44	16	42	58	68	—	—	—	—	—
1992–93	University of Michigan	CCHA	40	27	38	65	40	—	—	—	—	—
1993–94	United States	Intl	49	17	28	45	68	—	—	—	—	—
1993–94	Peoria Rivermen	IHL	10	4	6	10	4	—	—	—	—	—
1993–94	St. Louis Blues	NHL	1	0	0	0	2	3	0	0	0	12
1994–95	St. Louis Blues	NHL	19	6	5	11	10	6	0	0	0	4
1994–95	Peoria Rivermen	IHL	65	30	38	68	65	—	—	—	—	—
1995–96	Worcester IceCats	AHL	22	8	17	25	46	—	—	—	—	—
1995–96	St. Louis Blues	NHL	28	1	6	7	12	—	—	—	—	—
1995–96	Edmonton Oilers	NHL	6	2	4	6	6	—	—	—	—	—
1996–97	Vancouver Canucks	NHL	58	10	17	27	51	—	—	—	—	—
1997–98	Vancouver Canucks	NHL	13	1	1	2	4	—	—	—	—	—
1997–98	Syracuse Crunch	AHL	37	17	22	39	44	5	2	1	3	2
1998–99	Michigan K-Wings	IHL	75	32	38	70	77	4	1	2	3	2
1999–2000	EV Zug	NLA	40	15	21	36	100	11	3	4	7	16
2000–01	Grand Rapids Griffins	IHL	72	27	36	63	47	10	1	2	3	8
2001–02	Eisbären Berlin	DEL	54	23	28	51	76	4	1	3	4	4
2002–03	Eisbären Berlin	DEL	46	19	30	49	95	9	1	2	3	16
2003–04	Eisbären Berlin	DEL	29	12	13	25	28	11	3	9	12	10
NHL totals			125	20	33	53	85	9	0	0	0	16
IHL totals			222	93	118	211	193	14	2	4	6	10
DEL totals			129	54	71	125	199	24	5	14	19	30

=== International ===
Year	Team	Event	GP	G	A	Pts	PIM
1994	United States	OG	8	1	5	6	4
Senior totals			8	1	5	6	4

== Awards and honors ==
List of awards and honors.

Award	Year
All-CCHA Rookie Team	1989-90
All-CCHA Second team	1990-91
AHCA West Second-Team All-American	1990–91
All-CCHA Second team	1992-93

Awards and achievements
Preceded by Rod Brind'Amour	CCHA Rookie of the Year; 1989–90	Succeeded by Brian Wiseman
