= 1990 Hockey East men's ice hockey tournament =

Coordinates: 42°20′6.3″N 71°10′3.6″W

1990 Hockey East Men's ice hockey tournament
- Dates: March 1–11, 1990
- Teams: 8
- Finals site: Conte Forum; Chestnut Hill, Massachusetts
- Champions: Boston College (2nd title)
- Winning coach: Len Ceglarski (2nd title)
- MVP: Scott LaGrand (Boston College)
- Hockey East Men's Ice Hockey Tournaments

The 1990 Hockey East Men's Ice Hockey Tournament was the 6th tournament in the history of the conference. It was played between March 1 and March 11, 1990. All rounds were played at home team campus sites, with the final played at Conte Forum in Chestnut Hill, Massachusetts, the home venue of the Boston College Eagles. This was the final year the Hockey East championship was decided at a home venue to one of its member teams until 2021. By winning the tournament, Boston College received the Hockey East's automatic bid to the 1990 NCAA Division I Men's Ice Hockey Tournament.

== Format ==
The tournament featured three rounds of play. In the first round, the first and eighth seeds, the second and seventh seeds, the third seed and sixth seeds, and the fourth seed and fifth seeds played a best-of-three with the winner advancing to the semifinals. In the semifinals, the highest and lowest seeds and second highest and second lowest seeds play a single-elimination game, with the winners advancing to the championship game and the losers meeting in a third-place game. The tournament champion receives an automatic bid to the 1990 NCAA Division I Men's Ice Hockey Tournament.

== Conference standings ==
Note: GP = Games played; W = Wins; L = Losses; T = Ties; PTS = Points; GF = Goals For; GA = Goals Against

1989–90 Hockey East standings
	Conference							Overall					
	GP	W	L	T	PTS	GF	GA	GP	W	L	T	GF	GA
Boston College†*	21	15	6	0	30	101	69	42	28	13	1	197	135
Maine	21	14	6	1	29	88	57	46	33	11	2	238	137
Boston University	21	12	7	2	26	88	63	44	25	17	2	180	144
Providence	21	11	7	3	25	90	69	35	22	10	3	154	106
New Hampshire	21	8	9	4	20	86	86	39	17	17	5	166	156
Northeastern	21	9	10	2	20	96	100	37	16	19	2	167	181
Lowell	21	5	14	2	12	65	106	35	13	20	2	129	193
Merrimack	21	3	18	0	6	64	128	36	10	25	1	123	186
Championship: Boston College † indicates conference regular season champion * indicates conference tournament champion

== Bracket ==
Teams are reseeded after the quarterfinals

Quarterfinals; March 1–5
1	Boston College	3	3	8
8	Merrimack	1	6	5
2	Maine	7	16	—
7	Lowell	3	0	—
(Pairings are reseeded after the first round)
3	Boston University	3	5	5
6	Northeastern	4	2	3
4	Providence	5	0	4
5	New Hampshire	1	2	7

Semifinals; March 9
1	Boston College	5*
5	New Hampshire	4
2	Maine	3
3	Boston University	1

Championship; March 11
1	Boston College	4
2	Maine	3

Note: * denotes overtime period(s)

=== Quarterfinals ===
==== (1) Boston College vs. (8) Merrimack ====
March 2	Boston College	3 – 1	Merrimack	Conte Forum

March 4	Boston College	3 – 6	Merrimack	Conte Forum

March 5	Boston College	8 – 5	Merrimack	Conte Forum

Boston College won series 2–1

==== (2) Maine vs. (7) Lowell ====
March 2	Maine	7 – 3	Lowell	Alfond Arena

March 3	Maine	16 – 0	Lowell	Alfond Arena

Maine won series 2–0

==== (3) Boston University vs. (6) Northeastern ====
March 2	Boston University	3 – 4	Northeastern	Walter Brown Arena

March 3	Boston University	5 – 2	Northeastern	Walter Brown Arena

March 4	Boston University	5 – 3	Northeastern	Walter Brown Arena

Boston University won series 2–1

==== (4) Providence vs. (5) New Hampshire ====
March 1	Providence	5 – 1	New Hampshire	Schneider Arena

March 2	Providence	0 – 2	New Hampshire	Schneider Arena

March 4	Providence	4 – 7	New Hampshire	Schneider Arena

New Hampshire won series 2–1

=== Semifinals ===
==== (1) Boston College vs. (5) New Hampshire ====
March 9	Boston College	5 – 4	OT	New Hampshire	Conte Forum

==== (2) Maine vs. (3) Boston University ====
March 9	Maine	3 – 1	Boston University	Alfond Arena

=== Championship ===
==== (1) Boston College vs. (2) Maine ====
March 11	Boston College	4 – 3	Maine	Conte Forum

== Tournament awards ==
=== All-Tournament Team ===
- F David Emma (Boston College)
- F Martin Robitaille* (Maine)
- F Jean-Yves Roy (Maine)
- D Greg Brown (Boston College)
- D Claudio Scremin (Maine)
- G Scott LaGrand (Boston College)

* Tournament MVP(s)
