= CCHA Rookie of the Year =

- Sport: Ice hockey
- Awarded for: The Rookie of the Year in the CCHA

History
- First award: 1979
- Editions: 40
- First winner: George McPhee
- Most recent: Lucas Van Vliet

The CCHA Rookie of the Year is an annual award given out at the conclusion of the Central Collegiate Hockey Association regular season to the best freshman player in the conference as voted by the coaches of each CCHA team.

The Rookie of the Year award was first presented in 1978 and every year thereafter until 2013 when the original CCHA was dissolved as a consequence of the Big Ten Conference forming its men's ice hockey conference. The CCHA was reestablished in 2020, with play starting in the 2021–22 season, at which time the award was reinstated.

== Award winners ==
Year	Winner	Position	School
1978–79	George McPhee	Forward	Bowling Green
1979–80	Steve Mulholland	Right Wing	Lake Superior State
1980–81	Jeff Poeschl	Goaltender	Northern Michigan
1980–81	Paul Pooley	Forward	Ohio State
1981–82	Jon Elliot	Goaltender	Michigan
1982–83	Chris Seychel	Left Wing	Michigan
1983–84	Gary Emmons	Center	Northern Michigan
1983–84	Bill Shibicky	Forward	Michigan State
1984–85	Paul Ysebaert	Left Wing	Bowling Green
1985–86	Joe Murphy	Right Wing	Michigan State
1986–87	Nelson Emerson	Right Wing	Bowling Green
1987–88	John DePourcq	Center	Ferris State
1988–89	Rod Brind'Amour	Center	Michigan State
1989–90	David Roberts	Left Wing	Michigan
1990–91	Brian Wiseman	Center	Michigan
1991–92	Brian Loney	Right Wing	Ohio State
1992–93	Chris Brooks	Center	Western Michigan
1993–94	Brendan Morrison	Center	Michigan
1994–95	Marty Turco	Goaltender	Michigan
1995–96	Marc Magliarditi	Goaltender	Western Michigan
1996–97	Daryl Andrews	Defenceman	Western Michigan

Year	Winner	Position	School
1997–98	Mark Eaton	Defenceman	Notre Dame
1998–99	Mike Comrie	Center	Michigan
1999–00	Chris Gobert	Center	Northern Michigan
2000–01	R. J. Umberger	Center	Ohio State
2001–02	Patrick Dwyer	Right Wing	Western Michigan
2002–03	Jeff Tambellini	Left Wing	Michigan
2003–04	T. J. Hensick	Center	Michigan
2004–05	Bill Thomas	Right Wing	Nebraska-Omaha
2005–06	Jeff Lerg	Goaltender	Michigan State
2006–07	Mark Letestu	Center	Western Michigan
2007–08	Max Pacioretty	Left Wing	Michigan
2008–09	David Wohlberg	Center	Michigan
2009–10	Andy Taranto	Right Wing	Alaska
2010–11	T. J. Tynan	Center	Notre Dame
2011–12	Alex Guptill	Left Wing	Michigan
2012–13	Riley Barber	Right Wing	Miami
2021–22	Bradley Marek	Forward	Ferris State
2022–23	Kyle Kukkonen	Center	Michigan Tech
2023–24	Isaac Gordon	Forward	Michigan Tech
2024–25	Elias Jansson	Forward	Michigan Tech
2025–26	Lucas Van Vliet	Forward	St. Thomas

=== Winners by school ===
==== Current teams ====
School	Winners
Bowling Green	3
Michigan Tech	3
Northern Michigan	3
Ferris State	2
Lake Superior State	1
St. Thomas	1

==== Former teams ====
School	Winners
Michigan	12
Western Michigan	5
Michigan State	4
Ohio State	3
Notre Dame	2
Alaska	1
Miami	1
Nebraska-Omaha	1

=== Winners by position ===
Position	Winners
Center	14
Right Wing	8
Left Wing	6
Forward	7
Defenceman	2
Goaltender	5

== See also ==
- CCHA Awards
