= Sam Pollock Trophy =

US ice hockey award

- Sport: Ice hockey
- Awarded for: Central Division champions of the American Hockey League

History
- First award: 1995–96 AHL season
- Most recent: Grand Rapids Griffins

The Sam Pollock Trophy is presented annually to the American Hockey League team that has the best regular season record in the Central Division.

The award is named after former general manager of the Montreal Canadiens Sam Pollock.

== Winners ==
Total awards won
Wins	Team
5	Chicago Wolves
4	Hamilton Bulldogs
4	Milwaukee Admirals
4	Toronto Marlies
2	Grand Rapids Griffins
2	Manitoba Moose
2	Quebec Citadelles
2	Saint John Flames
1	Lowell Lock Monsters
1	Prince Edward Island Senators
1	Rochester Americans
1	St. John's Maple Leafs
1	Texas Stars
1	Utica Comets

=== Winner by season ===
Awarded for	Season	Team	Win
Atlantic Division champion	1995–96	Prince Edward Island Senators	1
Canadian Division champion	1996–97	St. John's Maple Leafs	1
Atlantic Division champion	1997–98	Saint John Flames	1
Atlantic Division champion	1998–99	Lowell Lock Monsters	1
Atlantic Division champion	1999–00	Quebec Citadelles	1
Canadian Division champion	2000–01	Saint John Flames	2
Canadian Division champion	2001–02	Quebec Citadelles	2
Canadian Division champion	2002–03	Hamilton Bulldogs	1
North Division champion	2003–04	Hamilton Bulldogs	2
North Division champion	2004–05	Rochester Americans	1
North Division champion	2005–06	Grand Rapids Griffins	1
North Division champion	2006–07	Manitoba Moose	1
North Division champion	2007–08	Toronto Marlies	1
North Division champion	2008–09	Manitoba Moose	2
North Division champion	2009–10	Hamilton Bulldogs	3
North Division champion	2010–11	Hamilton Bulldogs	4
North Division champion	2011–12	Toronto Marlies	2
North Division champion	2012–13	Toronto Marlies	3
North Division champion	2013–14	Toronto Marlies	4
North Division champion	2014–15	Utica Comets	1
Central Division champion	2015–16	Milwaukee Admirals	1
Central Division champion	2016–17	Chicago Wolves	1
Central Division champion	2017–18	Chicago Wolves	2
Central Division champion	2018–19	Chicago Wolves	3
Central Division champion	2019–20	Milwaukee Admirals	2
Central Division champion	2020–21	Chicago Wolves	4
Central Division champion	2021–22	Chicago Wolves	5
Central Division champion	2022–23	Texas Stars	1
Central Division champion	2023–24	Milwaukee Admirals	3
Central Division champion	2024–25	Milwaukee Admirals	4
Central Division champion	2025–26	Grand Rapids Griffins	2
