= Scott Lachance =

American ice hockey player (born 1972)

- Born: October 22, 1972 (age 53) Charlottesville, Virginia, U.S.
- Height: 6 ft 2 in (188 cm)
- Weight: 215 lb (98 kg; 15 st 5 lb)
- Position: Defense
- Shot: Left
- Played for: Columbus Blue Jackets; Vancouver Canucks; Montreal Canadiens; New York Islanders; Kloten Flyers; Lowell Devils
- National team: United States
- NHL draft: 4th overall, 1991; New York Islanders
- Playing career: 1990–2007

Scott Joseph Lachance (born October 22, 1972) is an American former professional ice hockey defenseman who last played for the Lowell Devils of the American Hockey League.

== Biography ==
Lachance was born in Charlottesville, Virginia and raised in Bristol, Connecticut, where he attended St. Paul Catholic High School. As a youth, he played in the 1985 and 1986 Quebec International Pee-Wee Hockey Tournaments with a minor ice hockey team from Middlesex County, Connecticut.

Lachance was named to the All-Hockey East Rookie Team in the 1990–91 season.

Lachance was selected 4th overall by the New York Islanders in the 1991 NHL entry draft. He played 819 career NHL games, scoring 31 goals and 112 assists for 143 points. He played in 1997 National Hockey League All-Star Game.

He has three children: Jake, Shane, and Ryan. His wife, Jaqueline, is the daughter of former Boston University hockey coach Jack Parker.

Currently Lachance is the Head of US Scouting for the New Jersey Devils.

== Career statistics ==
=== Regular season and playoffs ===
			Regular season					Playoffs
Season	Team	League	GP	G	A	Pts	PIM	GP	G	A	Pts	PIM
1988–89	Springfield Olympics	NEJHL	38	8	28	36	20	—	—	—	—	—
1989–90	Springfield Olympics	NEJHL	34	25	41	66	62	—	—	—	—	—
1990–91	Boston University	HE	31	5	19	24	48	—	—	—	—	—
1991–92	United States	Intl	36	1	10	11	34	—	—	—	—	—
1991–92	New York Islanders	NHL	17	1	4	5	9	—	—	—	—	—
1992–93	New York Islanders	NHL	75	7	17	24	67	—	—	—	—	—
1993–94	New York Islanders	NHL	74	3	11	14	70	3	0	0	0	0
1994–95	New York Islanders	NHL	26	6	7	13	26	—	—	—	—	—
1995–96	New York Islanders	NHL	55	3	10	13	54	—	—	—	—	—
1996–97	New York Islanders	NHL	81	3	11	14	47	—	—	—	—	—
1997–98	New York Islanders	NHL	63	2	11	13	45	—	—	—	—	—
1998–99	New York Islanders	NHL	59	1	8	9	30	—	—	—	—	—
1998–99	Montreal Canadiens	NHL	17	1	1	2	11	—	—	—	—	—
1999–2000	Montreal Canadiens	NHL	57	0	6	6	22	—	—	—	—	—
2000–01	Vancouver Canucks	NHL	76	3	11	14	46	2	0	1	1	2
2001–02	Vancouver Canucks	NHL	81	1	10	11	50	6	1	1	2	4
2002–03	Columbus Blue Jackets	NHL	61	0	1	1	46	—	—	—	—	—
2003–04	Columbus Blue Jackets	NHL	77	0	4	4	44	—	—	—	—	—
2005–06	Kloten Flyers	NLA	28	0	2	2	99	8	1	3	4	12
2006–07	Lowell Devils	AHL	25	0	4	4	14	—	—	—	—	—
NHL totals			819	31	112	143	567	11	1	2	3	6

=== International ===
Year	Team	Event	GP	G	A	Pts	PIM
1991	United States	WJC	7	2	1	3	2
1992	United States	WJC	7	1	4	5	0
1992	United States	OG	8	0	1	1	6
1996	United States	WC	8	0	0	0	2
1997	United States	WC	8	0	2	2	4
1999	United States	WC	6	0	0	0	4
Junior totals			14	3	5	8	2
Senior totals			30	0	3	3	16

Sporting positions
Preceded by Scott Scissons	New York Islanders first-round draft pick 1991	Succeeded by Darius Kasparaitis
