= Keith Carney =

American ice hockey player (born 1970)

- Born: February 3, 1970 (age 56) Providence, Rhode Island, U.S.
- Height: 6 ft 1 in (185 cm)
- Weight: 207 lb (94 kg; 14 st 11 lb)
- Position: Defense
- Shot: Left
- Played for: Buffalo Sabres; Chicago Blackhawks; Phoenix Coyotes; Mighty Ducks of Anaheim; Vancouver Canucks; Minnesota Wild
- National team: United States
- NHL draft: 76th overall, 1988; Buffalo Sabres
- Playing career: 1991–2009

Keith Edward Carney (born February 3, 1970) is an American former professional ice hockey defenseman. He last played for the Minnesota Wild of the National Hockey League (NHL) in the 2007–08 season.

== Playing career ==
Keith Carney was drafted 76th overall in the 1988 NHL entry draft by the Buffalo Sabres, after attending the prestigious Mount Saint Charles Academy. He then played for the University of Maine. On March 8, 1992, Keith made his NHL debut in a match against the New York Islanders. Two weeks later on March 22, he scored his first goal in the NHL against the Chicago Blackhawks. After playing 14 games that rookie season, he then played 30 games at the NHL level the following campaign.

He was traded from Chicago to the Phoenix Coyotes in 1998 for Chad Kilger and Jayson More. He played for the Team USA during the 1998 Winter Olympics.

In the summer of 2001, Keith was traded by Phoenix to the Mighty Ducks of Anaheim for a 2nd-round pick in the 2001 NHL entry draft.

On March 9, 2006, he was traded to the Vancouver Canucks in exchange for a second-round draft pick and defensemen Brett Skinner.

On July 1, 2006, he signed a 2-year, $4.2 million contract with the Minnesota Wild.

Carney was captain of the Minnesota Wild in December 2006.

In his 2006-07 regular season with the Minnesota Wild, he set a Minnesota Wild franchise record in Plus/minus finishing the season with a +22.

On February 24, 2008, Keith Carney played in his 1,000th NHL game, becoming only the 29th American (14th active defenseman at the time, and since the conclusion of the 2007/2008 NHL season) to accomplish this honor.

On April 11, 2008, in game 2 of the Western Conference Quarterfinals against the Colorado Avalanche, playing with the Minnesota Wild, he became the oldest defenseman to score an overtime goal in NHL playoffs history at 38 years of age.

On November 11, 2008, Keith Carney retired after 17 years in the NHL. Keith and his family live in Paradise Valley, Arizona.

On January 15, 2009, Carney signed a playoffs contract with Swiss National League club SC Bern.

In September 2009, he accepted an invitation to the Vancouver Canucks main training camp to try to earn an NHL contract. After further reflection he decided instead to retire for a second time. He was a scout for the Chicago Blackhawks from 2009 to 2011, and received a Stanley Cup ring with the Blackhawks in 2010. He currently coaches a youth hockey team in Paradise Valley, Arizona.

== Awards and honors ==
Award	Year
All-Hockey East Rookie Team	1988–89
All-Hockey East Second Team	1989–90
AHCA East Second-Team All-American	1989–90
All-Hockey East First Team	1990–91
AHCA East First-Team All-American	1990–91
Hockey East All-Tournament Team	1991
Inducted into RI Hockey Hall of Fame	2018

== Career statistics ==
=== Regular season and playoffs ===
			Regular season					Playoffs
Season	Team	League	GP	G	A	Pts	PIM	GP	G	A	Pts	PIM
1987–88	Mount St. Charles Academy	High-RI	23	12	43	55	—	—	—	—	—	—
1988–89	University of Maine	HE	40	4	22	26	24	—	—	—	—	—
1989–90	University of Maine	HE	41	3	41	44	43	—	—	—	—	—
1990–91	University of Maine	HE	40	7	49	56	38	—	—	—	—	—
1991–92	United States	Intl.	49	2	17	19	16	—	—	—	—	—
1991–92	Buffalo Sabres	NHL	14	1	2	3	18	7	0	3	3	0
1991–92	Rochester Americans	AHL	24	1	10	11	2	2	0	2	2	0
1992–93	Buffalo Sabres	NHL	30	2	4	6	55	8	0	3	3	6
1992–93	Rochester Americans	AHL	41	5	21	26	32	—	—	—	—	—
1993–94	Buffalo Sabres	NHL	7	1	3	4	4	—	—	—	—	—
1993–94	Chicago Blackhawks	NHL	30	3	5	8	35	6	0	1	1	4
1993–94	Indianapolis Ice	IHL	28	0	14	14	20	—	—	—	—	—
1994–95	Chicago Blackhawks	NHL	18	1	0	1	11	4	0	1	1	0
1995–96	Chicago Blackhawks	NHL	82	5	14	19	94	10	0	3	3	4
1996–97	Chicago Blackhawks	NHL	81	3	15	18	62	6	1	1	2	2
1997–98	Chicago Blackhawks	NHL	60	2	13	15	73	—	—	—	—	—
1997–98	Phoenix Coyotes	NHL	20	1	6	7	18	6	0	0	0	4
1998–99	Phoenix Coyotes	NHL	82	2	14	16	62	7	1	2	3	10
1999–2000	Phoenix Coyotes	NHL	82	4	20	24	87	5	0	0	0	17
2000–01	Phoenix Coyotes	NHL	82	2	14	16	62	—	—	—	—	—
2001–02	Mighty Ducks of Anaheim	NHL	60	5	9	14	30	—	—	—	—	—
2002–03	Mighty Ducks of Anaheim	NHL	81	4	18	22	65	21	0	4	4	16
2003–04	Mighty Ducks of Anaheim	NHL	69	2	5	7	42	—	—	—	—	—
2005–06	Mighty Ducks of Anaheim	NHL	61	2	16	18	48	—	—	—	—	—
2005–06	Vancouver Canucks	NHL	18	0	2	2	14	—	—	—	—	—
2006–07	Minnesota Wild	NHL	80	4	13	17	58	5	0	0	0	4
2007–08	Minnesota Wild	NHL	61	1	10	11	42	6	1	1	2	0
2008–09	SC Bern	NLA	12	0	4	4	8	6	0	2	2	6
NHL totals			1,018	45	183	228	904	91	3	19	22	67

=== International ===
Year	Team	Event	GP	G	A	Pts	PIM
1990	United States	WJC	7	0	3	3	2
1998	United States	OG	4	0	0	0	2

== See also ==
- List of NHL players with 1,000 games played

Sporting positions
Preceded by Brian Rolston	Minnesota Wild captain December, 2006	Succeeded by Brian Rolston
