= Scott LaGrand =

American ice hockey player (born 1970)

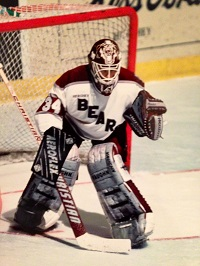
- Born: February 11, 1970 (age 56) Potsdam, New York, U.S.
- Height: 6 ft 0 in (183 cm)
- Weight: 170 lb (77 kg; 12 st 2 lb)
- Position: Goaltender
- Caught: Right
- Played for: AHL; Hershey Bears; IHL; Atlanta Knights; Orlando Solar Bears; Utah Grizzlies; Fort Wayne Komets; Chicago Wolves; ECHL; Tallahassee Tiger Sharks; Pensacola Ice Pilots; Charlotte Checkers
- NHL draft: 77th overall, 1988; Philadelphia Flyers
- Playing career: 1992–2001

Scott LaGrand (born February 11, 1970) is an American former professional ice hockey goaltender who played nine seasons in the American Hockey League (AHL), International Hockey League (IHL), and East Coast Hockey League (ECHL).

== Playing career ==
LaGrand was drafted in the fourth round, 77th overall, by the Philadelphia Flyers in the 1988 NHL entry draft. He enrolled at Boston College and was named MVP of the 1990 Hockey East Tournament as a freshman. After garnering All-American honors at Boston College he signed with the Flyers shortly before the 1992-1993 season. He spent three years in the Flyers system with the Hershey Bears of the AHL before being traded in 1995 to the Tampa Bay Lightning and was subsequently assigned to their top IHL affiliate the Atlanta Knights. LaGrand signed with the Orlando Solar Bears of the IHL prior to the 1995-1996 season and spent parts of four seasons in Orlando. He also appeared in the IHL with the Chicago Wolves, Utah Grizzlies, and Fort Wayne Komets. LaGrand finished his career in the East Coast Hockey League with the Pensacola Ice Pilots where he was named team MVP after the 1999-2000 season. He dressed in two games with the Charlotte Checkers in the 2009-2010 season.

== Awards and honors ==
Award	Year
Hockey East All-Tournament Team	1990
All-Hockey East First Team	1990–91
AHCA East Second-Team All-American	1991–92

Awards and achievements
Preceded by Bob Beers	William Flynn Tournament Most Valuable Player; 1990	Succeeded by Shawn McEachern
Preceded by Scott King	Hockey East Goaltending Champion; 1990–91	Succeeded by Derek Heriofsky
