= Brian Wiseman =

Canadian ice hockey player and coach

- Born: July 13, 1971 (age 55) Chatham, Ontario, Canada
- Height: 5 ft 7 in (170 cm)
- Weight: 196 lb (89 kg; 14 st 0 lb)
- Position: Centre
- Shot: Left
- Played for: Chicago Wolves; St. John's Maple Leafs; Toronto Maple Leafs; Houston Aeros
- NHL draft: 257th overall, 1991; New York Rangers
- Playing career: 1994–2000
- Coaching career: 2002–present

Brian M. Wiseman (born July 13, 1971) is a Canadian former professional ice hockey forward and NHL assistant coach.

== Biography ==
As a novice player, Wiseman scored 413 goals in a single season. This broke a record held by Wayne Gretzky, and brought about national attention to the nine-year-old Wiseman. He played in the 1984 Quebec International Pee-Wee Hockey Tournament with a minor ice hockey team from Chatham.

Wiseman owns the only retired number of the former Chatham MicMacs (now named Jr. Maroons) of the former Western Ontario Hockey League. His number 9 was retired after he left Chatham to play for the University of Michigan Wolverines. Approximately 3,600 spectators were in attendance to see Wiseman break Ed Olczyk's single season point record. Wiseman amassed 147 points in just 40 games in 1989–90.

During his career at University of Michigan, he was named Freshman of the Year in 1991, had Frozen Four appearances in 1992 and 1993 and the Wolverines were CCHA Tournament Champions in 1994. He finished his U-M career with 248 points including a school-record 164 assists.

In 1996, Wiseman faced trial for alleged sexual assault of a 15-year-old girl that occurred in 1991. He was acquitted.

He was drafted by the New York Rangers in the 12th round of the 1991 NHL Entry Draft after his freshman season, but remained at U-M to complete his stellar career.

Wiseman would next move to play hockey professionally. He played for the Chicago Wolves (IHL), St. John's Maple Leafs (AHL), Toronto Maple Leafs (NHL), and Houston Aeros (IHL) before retiring due to concussion problems stemming from an injury suffered during the Aeros' 1999–2000 playoff season. He helped the Houston Aeros capture the Turner Cup in the 1998–1999 season and was named the IHL's Most Valuable Player in 1999 after leading the league in scoring with 109 points.

After his playing career, he spent one season as a video coach with the Dallas Stars and another as an assistant coach at Princeton University. From 2012-2019, Wiseman was an assistant coach for varsity ice hockey at the University of Michigan. From 2019 until 2022, he was an assistant coach for the Edmonton Oilers.

On July 5, 2022 The New York Islanders announced that Doug Houda and Brian Wiseman have been brought on as assistant coaches under Lane Lambert.

On July 28, 2022 The New York Islanders announced that John MacLean would be joining the coaching staff of the Islanders for the 2022-2023 season and that Wiseman would not be on the staff. No reason was given for the change.

On August 19, 2022, Wiseman was named as an assistant coach for the San Jose Sharks.

In 2007, Wiseman was inducted into the Chatham (Ontario) Sports Hall of Fame.

== Career statistics ==
			Regular season					Playoffs
Season	Team	League	GP	G	A	Pts	PIM	GP	G	A	Pts	PIM
1986–87	Dresden Jr. Kings	GLCJHL	33	12	29	41	53	—	—	—	—	—
1987–88	Chatham Maroons	WOHL	41	26	33	59	35	—	—	—	—	—
1988–89	Chatham MicMac	WOHL	42	36	71	107	34	—	—	—	—	—
1989–90	Chatham MicMac	WOHL	40	70	77	147	32	—	—	—	—	—
1990–91	University of Michigan	NCAA	47	25	33	58	58	—	—	—	—	—
1991–92	University of Michigan	NCAA	44	27	44	71	76	—	—	—	—	—
1992–93	University of Michigan	NCAA	35	13	38	51	38	—	—	—	—	—
1993–94	University of Michigan	NCAA	40	19	50	69	44	—	—	—	—	—
1994–95	Chicago Wolves	IHL	75	17	55	72	52	3	1	1	2	4
1995–96	Chicago Wolves	IHL	73	33	55	88	117	—	—	—	—	—
1996–97	St. John's Maple Leafs	AHL	71	33	62	95	83	7	5	4	9	8
1996–97	Toronto Maple Leafs	NHL	3	0	0	0	0	—	—	—	—	—
1997–98	Houston Aeros	IHL	78	26	72	98	86	4	0	3	3	8
1998–99	Houston Aeros	IHL	77	21	88	109	106	19	3	13	16	26
1999–00	Houston Aeros	IHL	72	15	38	53	52	3	0	1	1	6
NHL totals			3	0	0	0	0	—	—	—	—	—

== Awards and honours ==
Award	Year
All-CCHA Rookie Team	1990–91
CCHA All-Tournament Team	1992, 1994
All-CCHA First Team	1993–94
AHCA West First-Team All-American	1993–94

Awards and achievements
Preceded by David Roberts	CCHA Rookie of the Year; 1990–91	Succeeded by Brian Loney
