= Carolina Monarchs =

- City: Greensboro, North Carolina
- League: American Hockey League
- Conference: Southern
- Operated: 1995–1997
- Home arena: Greensboro Coliseum
- Colors: Red, Blue & Gold
- Media: News & Record
- Affiliates: Florida Panthers

Franchise history
- 1989–1995: Greensboro Monarchs
- 1995–1997: Carolina Monarchs
- 1997–1999: Beast of New Haven

The Carolina Monarchs were a short-lived ice hockey team in the American Hockey League. They played in Greensboro, North Carolina, at the Greensboro Coliseum, succeeding the ECHL Greensboro Monarchs, some of whose owners accepted an expansion proposal from the AHL to start play in the 1995-96 season.

Just two seasons later, though, the Hartford Whalers of the NHL announced that they would play in the Greensboro Coliseum for the 1997–98 and 1998-99 seasons as the newly named Carolina Hurricanes, awaiting their permanent home arena's construction in Raleigh. The NHL team purchased the dethroned Monarchs, moving the franchise to New Haven, Connecticut, where the team played as the Beast of New Haven.

== History ==
The market was previously served by:

- Carolina Thunderbirds/Winston-Salem Thunderbirds (ACHL, AAHL, ECHL) (1981–1992)
- Greensboro Monarchs (ECHL) (1989–1995)

The market was subsequently home to:

- Greensboro Gargoyles (ECHL) (2025-present)
- Greensboro Generals (ECHL) (1999–2004)
- Carolina Hurricanes (NHL) (1997–1999)

=== American Hockey League Hall of Famers ===
AHL Hall of Fame Honored Members
Name	Seasons	Induction Year
Brad Smyth	1995-96 (player)	2019

== Season-by-season results ==
- Carolina Monarchs 1995–1997
- Beast of New Haven 1997–1999

Season	Games	Won	Lost	Tied	OTL	Points	Goals for	Goals against	Standing	Playoffs
1995–96	80	28	38	11	3	70	313	343	4th, South	Out of playoffs
1996–97	80	28	43	4	5	65	273	303	5th, Mid-Atlantic	Out of playoffs
