= Shawn McEachern =

American ice hockey player

- Born: February 28, 1969 (age 57) Waltham, Massachusetts, U.S.
- Height: 5 ft 11 in (180 cm)
- Weight: 195 lb (88 kg; 13 st 13 lb)
- Position: Left wing
- Shot: Left
- Played for: Pittsburgh Penguins; Los Angeles Kings; Boston Bruins; Ottawa Senators; Atlanta Thrashers; Kiekko-Espoo; Malmö IF
- National team: United States
- NHL draft: 110th overall, 1987; Pittsburgh Penguins
- Playing career: 1991–2006

Shawn Kenneth McEachern (/məkˈɛkərn/ mək-EK-ərn; born February 28, 1969) is an American ice hockey coach and former professional ice hockey player. He is the current head men's ice hockey coach at Suffolk University, in Boston, Massachusetts.

== Biography ==
As a youth, McEachern played in the 1981 and 1982 Quebec International Pee-Wee Hockey Tournaments with a minor ice hockey team from Boston.

During his stint as a professional, he tallied 254 goals and 317 assists during a 13-year NHL career with the Boston Bruins, Pittsburgh Penguins, Los Angeles Kings, Ottawa Senators and Atlanta Thrashers. He scored over 30 goals in two different seasons and his best point total came in 2000–01, when he notched 32 goals and 40 assists for the Ottawa Senators. He won a Stanley Cup championship in 1992 with the Pittsburgh Penguins. On August 27, 2006, he announced his retirement.

Before entering the NHL, McEachern was a standout ice hockey player at Boston University and at Matignon High School in Cambridge, Massachusetts, where he won two state championships. He has previously served as an assistant hockey coach at University of Massachusetts Lowell, as well as Northeastern University and Salem State University. He is also the coach for the East Coast Wizards U16 team in Bedford, Massachusetts.

== Awards and honors ==
Award	Year
All-Hockey East Second team	1989–90
All-Hockey East First Team	1990–91
AHCA East First-Team All-American	1990–91
Hockey East All-Tournament Team	1991
Stanley Cup championship (Pittsburgh)	1992

== Career statistics ==
=== Regular season and playoffs ===
			Regular season					Playoffs
Season	Team	League	GP	G	A	Pts	PIM	GP	G	A	Pts	PIM
1985–86	Matignon High School	HS-MA	20	32	20	52	—	—	—	—	—	—
1986–87	Matignon High School	HS-MA	16	29	28	57	—	—	—	—	—	—
1987–88	Matignon High School	HS-MA	22	52	40	92	—	—	—	—	—	—
1988–89	Boston University	HE	36	20	28	48	32	—	—	—	—	—
1989–90	Boston University	HE	43	25	31	56	78	—	—	—	—	—
1990–91	Boston University	HE	41	34	48	82	43	—	—	—	—	—
1991–92	United States	Intl	57	26	23	49	38	—	—	—	—	—
1991–92	Pittsburgh Penguins	NHL	15	0	4	4	0	19	2	7	9	4
1992–93	Pittsburgh Penguins	NHL	84	28	33	61	46	12	3	2	5	10
1993–94	Los Angeles Kings	NHL	49	8	13	21	24	—	—	—	—	—
1993–94	Pittsburgh Penguins	NHL	27	12	9	21	10	6	1	0	1	2
1994–95	Kiekko-Espoo	SM-l	8	1	3	4	6	—	—	—	—	—
1994–95	Pittsburgh Penguins	NHL	44	13	13	26	22	11	0	2	2	8
1995–96	Boston Bruins	NHL	82	24	29	53	34	5	2	1	3	8
1996–97	Ottawa Senators	NHL	65	11	20	31	18	7	2	0	2	8
1997–98	Ottawa Senators	NHL	81	24	24	48	42	11	0	4	4	8
1998–99	Ottawa Senators	NHL	77	31	25	56	46	4	2	0	2	6
1999–2000	Ottawa Senators	NHL	69	29	22	51	24	6	0	3	3	4
2000–01	Ottawa Senators	NHL	82	32	40	72	62	4	0	2	2	2
2001–02	Ottawa Senators	NHL	80	15	31	46	52	12	0	4	4	2
2002–03	Atlanta Thrashers	NHL	46	10	16	26	28	—	—	—	—	—
2003–04	Atlanta Thrashers	NHL	82	17	38	55	76	—	—	—	—	—
2004–05	Malmö IF	SEL	6	0	1	1	14	—	—	—	—	—
2005–06	Boston Bruins	NHL	28	2	6	8	22	—	—	—	—	—
2005–06	Providence Bruins	AHL	10	2	4	6	6	—	—	—	—	—
NHL totals			911	256	323	579	506	97	12	25	37	62

=== International ===
Year	Team	Event	GP	G	A	Pts	PIM
1991	United States	WC	10	3	2	5	6
1992	United States	OG	8	1	0	1	10
1996	United States	WCH	1	0	1	1	0
Senior totals			19	4	3	7	16

== See also ==
- Captain (ice hockey)

Awards and achievements
Preceded by Scott LaGrand	William Flynn Tournament Most Valuable Player; 1991	Succeeded by Scott Pellerin
Sporting positions
Preceded by Ray Ferraro	Atlanta Thrashers captain 2002–04	Succeeded by Scott Mellanby
