= 1991 Hockey East men's ice hockey tournament =

1991 Hockey East Men's ice hockey tournament
- Dates: February 27–March 10, 1991
- Teams: 8
- Finals site: Boston Garden; Boston, Massachusetts
- Champions: Boston University (2nd title)
- Winning coach: Jack Parker (2nd title)
- MVP: Shawn McEachern (Boston University)
- Hockey East Men's Ice Hockey Tournaments

The 1991 Hockey East Men's Ice Hockey Tournament was the 7th tournament in the history of the conference. It was played between February 27 and March 10, 1991. Quarterfinal games were played at home team campus sites, while the final four games were played at the Boston Garden in Boston, Massachusetts, the home venue of the NHL's Boston Bruins. By winning the tournament, Boston University received the Hockey East's automatic bid to the 1991 NCAA Division I Men's Ice Hockey Tournament.

== Format ==
The tournament featured three rounds of play with each round being a single-elimination game. In the first round, the first and eighth seeds, the second and seventh seeds, the third seed and sixth seeds, and the fourth seed and fifth seeds played with the winners advancing to the semifinals. In the semifinals, the highest and lowest seeds and second highest and second lowest seeds play with the winners advancing to the championship game. The tournament champion receives an automatic bid to the 1991 NCAA Division I Men's Ice Hockey Tournament.

== Conference standings ==
Note: GP = Games played; W = Wins; L = Losses; T = Ties; PTS = Points; GF = Goals For; GA = Goals Against

1990–91 Hockey East standings
| | Conference | | | | | | | Overall | | | | | |
| | GP | W | L | T | PTS | GF | GA | GP | W | L | T | GF | GA |
|---|---|---|---|---|---|---|---|---|---|---|---|---|---|
| Boston College† | 21 | 16 | 5 | 0 | 32 | 106 | 77 | 39 | 27 | 12 | 0 | 185 | 133 |
| Maine | 21 | 15 | 5 | 1 | 31 | 110 | 73 | 43 | 32 | 9 | 2 | 227 | 134 |
| Boston University* | 21 | 13 | 6 | 2 | 28 | 104 | 69 | 41 | 28 | 11 | 2 | 234 | 142 |
| Providence | 21 | 10 | 9 | 2 | 22 | 94 | 84 | 36 | 22 | 12 | 2 | 180 | 139 |
| New Hampshire | 21 | 10 | 9 | 2 | 22 | 79 | 78 | 35 | 22 | 11 | 2 | 151 | 124 |
| Merrimack | 21 | 7 | 14 | 0 | 14 | 71 | 103 | 33 | 13 | 19 | 1 | 133 | 152 |
| Lowell | 21 | 5 | 15 | 1 | 11 | 69 | 108 | 34 | 10 | 23 | 1 | 125 | 169 |
| Northeastern | 21 | 3 | 16 | 2 | 8 | 86 | 127 | 35 | 8 | 25 | 2 | 146 | 196 |
Championship: Boston University † indicates conference regular season champion * indicates conference tournament champion

== Bracket ==
Teams are reseeded after the quarterfinals

Quarterfinals; February 27–March 2
1 | Boston College | 5
8 | Northeastern | 6
2 | Maine | 5
7 | Lowell | 3
3 | Boston University | 7
6 | Merrimack | 1
4 | Providence | 4
5 | New Hampshire | 1

Semifinals; March 8
2 | Maine | 4*
8 | Northeastern | 3
3 | Boston University | 7
4 | Providence | 5

Championship; March 10
2 | Maine | 3
3 | Boston University | 4*

Note: * denotes overtime period(s)

=== Quarterfinals ===
==== (1) Boston College vs. (8) Northeastern ====
| February 27 | Boston College | 5 – 6 | Northeastern | Conte Forum |

==== (2) Maine vs. (7) Lowell ====
| March 2 | Maine | 5 – 3 | Lowell | Alfond Arena |

==== (3) Boston University vs. (6) Merrimack ====
| February 28 | Boston University | 7 – 1 | Merrimack | Walter Brown Arena |

==== (4) Providence vs. (5) New Hampshire ====
| March 1 | Providence | 4 – 1 | New Hampshire | Schneider Arena |

=== Semifinals ===
==== (2) Maine vs. (8) Northeastern ====
| March 8 | Maine | 4 – 3 | OT | Northeastern | Boston Garden |

==== (3) Boston University vs. (4) Providence ====
| March 8 | Boston University | 7 – 5 | Providence | Boston Garden |

=== Championship ===
==== (2) Maine vs. (3) Boston University ====
| March 10 | Maine | 3 – 4 | OT | Boston University | Boston Garden |

== Tournament awards ==
=== All-Tournament Team ===
- F Sebastian Laplante (Northeastern)
- F Shawn McEachern* (Boston University)
- F Steve Tepper (Maine)
- D Peter Ahola (Boston University)
- D Keith Carney (Maine)
- G John Bradley (Boston University)

* Tournament MVP(s)
