= Chris Gordon (ice hockey) =

American ice hockey player

- Born: February 16, 1970 (age 56) Grand Rapids, Michigan, U.S.
- Height: 5 ft 11 in (180 cm)
- Weight: 165 lb (75 kg; 11 st 11 lb)
- Position: Goaltender
- Caught: Left
- Played for: Huntington Blizzard (ECHL); Worcester IceCats (AHL); Detroit Vipers (IHL); Flint Generals (CoHL); El Paso Buzzards (WPHL)
- NHL draft: Undrafted
- Playing career: 1994–1999

Chris Gordon (born February 16, 1970) is an American former professional ice hockey goaltender.

== Early life ==
Gordon was born in Grand Rapids, Michigan. He attended University of Michigan from 1990 to 1994, where he played NCAA Division I college hockey with the Michigan Wolverines men's ice hockey team.

== Career ==
Gordon began his professional career in 1994 by joining the Huntington Blizzard of the ECHL. In his first year with the Blizzard his outstanding play was recognized when he was selected as the ECHL Goaltender of the Year and was named to the 1994–95 ECHL First All-Star Team.

Gordon helped backstop the El Paso Buzzards to capture the WPHL President's Cup as Western Professional Hockey League's Playoff Champions for both the 1996–97 and 1997–98 WPHL seasons.

== Awards and honors ==
Award	Year
ECHL Goaltender of the Year	1994–95
ECHL First All-Star Team	1994–95
