= Peter Ahola =

Finnish ice hockey player

- Born: 14 May 1968 (age 57); Espoo, Finland
- Height: 6 ft 3 in (191 cm)
- Weight: 205 lb (93 kg; 14 st 9 lb)
- Position: Defence
- Shot: Left
- Played for: Los Angeles Kings; Pittsburgh Penguins; San Jose Sharks; Calgary Flames; Espoo Blues; HIFK; TPS; Södertälje SK
- NHL draft: Undrafted
- Playing career: 1987–2003

Peter Kristian Ahola (born 14 May 1968) is a Finnish former professional ice hockey player who played in the National Hockey League for the Los Angeles Kings, Pittsburgh Penguins, Calgary Flames, and the San Jose Sharks.

== Playing career ==
In his rookie year in Los Angeles, Ahola led the Kings in +/- with a +12 in the 1991–92 NHL season. He also scored 7 goals and 12 assists for 19 points in 71 games. He was then traded to Pittsburgh for Jeff Chychrun during the next season. In Pittsburgh, he played 22 games and didn't register a goal and only scored one assist. Ahola was then traded a second time in that season to the San Jose Sharks. The Sharks traded him to the Tampa Bay Lightning on 19 June 1993 for Jack Capuano, but then was traded to the Calgary Flames for cash on 5 October 1993. This was his fourth trade in eleven months. He only played two games on the Flames before he got sent down to the minor league team, the Saint John Flames.

In total, Ahola played 123 regular season games, scoring 10 goals and 17 assists for 27 points and collecting 137 penalty minutes. He also played six playoff games during his rookie season with the Kings but didn't register a point. Ahola went back to Finland's SM-liiga in 1994 and then to Sweden's Elitserien in 2001 before retiring in 2003.

== Personal ==
Ahola is a formerly top-rated water-skier in his homeland of Finland. He currently serves as a European scout for the Vegas Golden Knights of the NHL, serving in the role since the 2016–17 season.

== Career statistics ==
			Regular season					Playoffs
Season	Team	League	GP	G	A	Pts	PIM	GP	G	A	Pts	PIM
1987–88	Kiekko-Espoo	FIN-3	28	6	10	16	44	—	—	—	—	—
1988–89	Kiekko-Espoo	FIN-2	44	5	10	15	62	—	—	—	—	—
1989–90	Boston University	HE	43	3	20	23	65	—	—	—	—	—
1990–91	Boston University	HE	39	12	24	36	88	—	—	—	—	—
1991–92	Phoenix Roadrunners	IHL	7	3	3	6	34	—	—	—	—	—
1991–92	Los Angeles Kings	NHL	71	7	12	19	101	6	0	0	0	2
1992–93	Los Angeles Kings	NHL	8	1	1	2	6	—	—	—	—	—
1992–93	Pittsburgh Penguins	NHL	22	0	1	1	14	—	—	—	—	—
1992–93	Cleveland Lumberjacks	IHL	9	1	0	1	4	—	—	—	—	—
1992–93	San Jose Sharks	NHL	20	2	3	5	16	—	—	—	—	—
1993–94	Calgary Flames	NHL	2	0	0	0	0	—	—	—	—	—
1993–94	Saint John Flames	AHL	66	9	29	28	59	6	1	2	3	12
1994–95	Kiekko-Espoo	FIN	50	12	21	33	96	4	5	1	6	10
1995–96	HIFK	FIN	34	7	7	14	58	3	1	0	1	2
1996–97	HIFK	FIN	50	8	12	20	89	—	—	—	—	—
1997–98	TPS	FIN	46	6	17	23	36	4	0	0	0	6
1998–99	TPS	FIN	47	12	21	33	93	10	3	7	10	12
1999–00	Espoo Blues	FIN	50	12	24	36	110	4	1	2	3	38
2000–01	Espoo Blues	FIN	51	8	13	21	112	—	—	—	—	—
2001–02	Södertälje SK	SEL	49	4	14	18	91	—	—	—	—	—
2002–03	Södertälje SK	SEL	47	6	4	10	48	—	—	—	—	—
FIN totals			328	65	115	180	594	25	10	10	20	68
NHL totals			123	10	17	27	137	6	0	0	0	2

== Awards and honors ==
Award	Year
College
All-Hockey East Rookie Team	1989–90
AHCA West Second-Team All-American	1989–90
Hockey East All-Tournament Team	1991
SM-liiga
Champion (TPS Turku)	1999

== Transactions ==
- On 5 April 1991 the Los Angeles Kings signed free agent Peter Ahola.
- On 6 November 1992 the Los Angeles Kings traded Peter Ahola to the Pittsburgh Penguins in exchange for Jeff Chychrun.
- On 26 February 1993 the Pittsburgh Penguins traded Peter Ahola to the San Jose Sharks in exchange for future considerations.
- On 19 June 1993 the San Jose Sharks traded Peter Ahola to the Tampa Bay Lightning in exchange for Dave Capuano.
- On 5 October 1993 the Tampa Bay Lightning traded Peter Ahola to the Calgary Flames in exchange for cash.
