= 1990–91 NCAA Division I men's ice hockey season =

- Duration: October 1990– March 30, 1991
- NCAA tournament: 1991
- National championship: Saint Paul Civic Center; Saint Paul, Minnesota
- NCAA champion: Northern Michigan
- Hobey Baker Award: David Emma (Boston College)

The 1990–91 NCAA Division I men's ice hockey season began in October 1990 and concluded with the 1991 NCAA Division I Men's Ice Hockey Tournament's championship game on March 30, 1991, at the Saint Paul Civic Center in Saint Paul, Minnesota. This was the 44th season in which an NCAA ice hockey championship was held and is the 97th year overall where an NCAA school fielded a team.

== Season Outlook ==
=== Pre-season polls ===
The top teams in the nation as ranked before the start of the season.

The WMPL poll was voted on by coaches. The WMEB was voted on by media. The Times Union poll was voted on by coaches, media, and NHL scouts.

WMPL Poll
Rank	Team
1	North Dakota (5)
2	Boston University (2)
3	Michigan State
4	Michigan (1)
5	Northern Michigan
6	Boston College
7 (tie)	Wisconsin (1)
7 (tie)	Minnesota
9 (tie)	Lake Superior State (1)
9 (tie)	Maine

WMEB Poll
Rank	Team
1	Boston University (11)
2	North Dakota (1)
3	Minnesota (4)
4	Michigan State (2)
5	Boston College (1)
6	Maine
7	Northern Michigan
8	Lake Superior State
9	Wisconsin (1)
10	Michigan
11	Cornell
12	Clarkson
13 (tie)	Harvard
13 (tie)	Rensselaer
15	Bowling Green

Times Union Poll
Rank	Team
1	Boston University (19)
2	North Dakota (1)
3	Minnesota (2)
4	Michigan State (3)
5	Boston College
6	Maine
7	Northern Michigan
8	Cornell
9	Michigan
10	Rensselaer

== Regular season ==
=== Season tournaments ===
Tournament	Dates	Teams	Champion
USAir Hockey Classic	November 2–3	4	Providence
Yale Hockey Classic	November 23–24	4	Colgate
Great Western Freeze–Out	December 20–21	4	Michigan State
Dexter Shoe Classic	December 21–22	4	Maine
Jeep/Nissan Classic	December 21–23	4	Alaska–Anchorage
Badger Showdown	December 28–29	4	Wisconsin
Great Lakes Invitational	December 28–29	4	Michigan
Rensselaer Holiday Tournament	December 28–29	4	Rensselaer
Syracuse Invitational	December 28–29	4	Lake Superior State
Sheraton/USAir Hockey Classic	December 29–30	4	New Hampshire
Beanpot	February 4, 11	4	Boston University

=== Standings ===
1990–91 Central Collegiate Hockey Association standings
	Conference							Overall					
	GP	W	L	T	PTS	GF	GA	GP	W	L	T	GF	GA
Lake Superior State†*	32	26	2	4	56	181	77	45	36	5	4	252	122
Michigan	32	24	5	3	51	178	107	47	34	10	3	248	162
Ferris State	32	15	12	5	35	122	111	42	23	14	5	174	144
Western Michigan	32	16	14	2	34	121	115	42	22	17	3	161	161
Michigan State	32	14	13	5	33	130	101	40	17	18	5	155	130
Bowling Green	32	13	17	2	28	123	144	40	15	23	2	149	190
Ohio State	32	9	19	4	22	99	158	40	11	25	4	135	209
Illinois-Chicago	32	9	21	2	20	112	150	38	13	23	2	143	165
Miami	32	3	26	3	9	78	181	37	5	29	3	97	219
Championship: Lake Superior State † indicates conference regular season champion * indicates conference tournament champion

1990–91 ECAC Hockey standings
	Conference							Overall					
	GP	W	L	T	PTS	GF	GA	GP	W	L	T	GF	GA
Clarkson†*	22	15	5	2	32	113	77	40	29	9	2	213	143
Cornell	22	14	5	3	31	93	69	32	18	11	3	143	111
St. Lawrence	22	15	6	1	31	101	79	35	21	13	1	146	121
Harvard	22	13	7	2	28	130	74	29	14	12	3	145	102
Rensselaer	22	14	8	0	28	118	93	32	19	12	1	171	140
Vermont	22	12	8	2	26	89	83	33	17	14	2	129	130
Colgate	22	9	9	4	22	93	81	32	16	12	4	138	125
Brown	22	9	11	2	20	78	99	27	9	15	3	94	127
Yale	22	9	11	2	20	80	89	29	11	16	2	98	123
Princeton	22	7	14	1	15	84	104	27	8	18	1	97	129
Army	22	3	17	2	8	56	106	29	8	18	3	104	121
Dartmouth	22	0	19	3	3	52	131	28	1	24	3	68	170
Championship: Clarkson † indicates conference regular season champion * indicates conference tournament champion (Whitelaw Cup)

1990–91 Hockey East standings
	Conference							Overall					
	GP	W	L	T	PTS	GF	GA	GP	W	L	T	GF	GA
Boston College†	21	16	5	0	32	106	77	39	27	12	0	185	133
Maine	21	15	5	1	31	110	73	43	32	9	2	227	134
Boston University*	21	13	6	2	28	104	69	41	28	11	2	234	142
Providence	21	10	9	2	22	94	84	36	22	12	2	180	139
New Hampshire	21	10	9	2	22	79	78	35	22	11	2	151	124
Merrimack	21	7	14	0	14	71	103	33	13	19	1	133	152
Lowell	21	5	15	1	11	69	108	34	10	23	1	125	169
Northeastern	21	3	16	2	8	86	127	35	8	25	2	146	196
Championship: Boston University † indicates conference regular season champion * indicates conference tournament champion

1990–91 NCAA Division I Independent ice hockey standings
	Conference							Overall					
	GP	W	L	T	PTS	GF	GA	GP	W	L	T	GF	GA
Air Force	0	0	0	0	-	-	-	32	11	17	4	118	149
Alabama–Huntsville	0	0	0	0	-	-	-	32	9	21	2	113	164
Alaska–Anchorage	0	0	0	0	-	-	-	43	22	17	4	203	143
Alaska–Fairbanks	0	0	0	0	-	-	-	35	17	16	2	-	-
Kent State	0	0	0	0	-	-	-	35	10	22	3	143	157
Notre Dame	0	0	0	0	-	-	-	33	16	15	2	134	144

1990–91 Western Collegiate Hockey Association standings
	Conference							Overall					
	GP	W	L	T	PTS	GF	GA	GP	W	L	T	GF	GA
Northern Michigan†*	32	25	3	4	54	185	89	47	38	5	4	283	133
Minnesota	32	22	5	5	49	151	97	45	30	10	5	215	142
Wisconsin	32	19	11	2	40	132	108	44	26	15	3	174	143
North Dakota	32	18	12	2	38	148	127	43	24	17	2	207	171
St. Cloud State	32	12	16	4	28	124	152	41	18	19	4	170	186
Minnesota-Duluth	32	11	15	6	28	114	133	40	14	19	7	142	164
Michigan Tech	32	9	21	2	20	105	134	41	13	25	3	139	164
Colorado College	32	9	22	1	19	106	139	40	13	26	1	129	169
Denver	32	5	25	2	12	95	182	38	6	30	2	109	224
Championship: Northern Michigan † indicates conference regular season champion * indicates conference tournament champion

=== Final regular season polls ===
The final polls were released before the conference tournaments.

WMPL Coaches Poll
Ranking	Team
1	Lake Superior State (10)
2	Northern Michigan
3	Boston College
4	Maine
5	Michigan
6	Minnesota
7	Clarkson
8	Boston University
9	Wisconsin
10	Cornell

WMEB Media Poll
Ranking	Team
1	Lake Superior State (12)
2	Northern Michigan (1)
3	Maine
4	Michigan
5	Boston College
6	Minnesota
7	Boston University
8	Clarkson
9	Wisconsin
10	New Hampshire
11	Cornell
12	Providence
13	North Dakota
14	St. Lawrence
15	Ferris State

Times Union Poll
Ranking	Team
1	Lake Superior State (22)
2	Northern Michigan (2)
3	Maine
4	Michigan
5	Boston College (1)
6	Minnesota
7	Boston University
8	Clarkson
9	New Hampshire
10	Wisconsin

== 1991 NCAA Tournament ==
First Round; March 15–17
W4	Minnesota	3	8	8
E5	Providence	4	4	3
E3	Boston College	2	1	–
W6	Alaska-Anchorage	3	3	–
E4	Clarkson	8	5	–
W5	Wisconsin	3	4	–
W3	Michigan	4	6	9
E6	Cornell	5*	4	3

Quarterfinals; March 22–24
E1	Maine	4	5	–
W4	Minnesota	0	3	–
W2	Northern Michigan	8	5	–
W6	Alaska Anchorage	5	3	–
W1	Lake Superior State	3	6	3
E4	Clarkson	7	2	4
E2	Boston University	4	8	–
W3	Michigan	1	1	–

National Semifinals; March 28
E1	Maine	3
W2	Northern Michigan	5
E4	Clarkson	3
E2	Boston University	7

National Championship; March 30
W2	Northern Michigan	8***
E2	Boston University	7

Note: * denotes overtime period(s)

== Player stats ==
=== Scoring leaders ===
The following players led the league in points at the conclusion of the season.

GP = Games played; G = Goals; A = Assists; Pts = Points; PIM = Penalty minutes

Player	Class	Team	GP	G	A	Pts	PIM
Scott Beattie	Sophomore	Northern Michigan	46	48	41	89	66
Jean-Yves Roy	Sophomore	Maine	43	37	45	82	26
Shawn McEachern	Junior	Boston University	41	34	48	82	43
David Emma	Senior	Boston College	39	35	46	81	44
Jim Montgomery	Sophomore	Maine	43	24	57	81	44
Greg Johnson	Sophomore	North Dakota	38	18	61	79	6
Jim Dowd	Senior	Lake Superior State	44	24	54	78	53
Denny Felsner	Junior	Michigan	46	40	35	75	58
Hugo Belanger	Sophomore	Clarkson	40	32	43	75	18
Doug Weight	Sophomore	Lake Superior State	42	29	46	75	86

=== Leading goaltenders ===
The following goaltenders led the league in goals against average at the end of the regular season while playing at least 33% of their team's total minutes.

GP = Games played; Min = Minutes played; W = Wins; L = Losses; OT = Overtime/shootout losses; GA = Goals against; SO = Shutouts; SV% = Save percentage; GAA = Goals against average

Player	Class	Team	GP	Min	W	L	OT	GA	SO	SV%	GAA
Darrin Madeley	Sophomore	Lake Superior State	36	2137	29	3	3	93	1	.917	2.40
Mike Gilmore	Junior	Michigan State	22	1218	9	8	3	54	0	.901	2.66
Jeff Stolp	Senior	Minnesota	32	1769	18	8	3	82	1	.894	2.78
Bill Pye	Senior	Northern Michigan	39	2300	32	3	4	109	4	.886	2.84
Mike Dunham	Freshman	Maine	23	1275	14	5	2	63	0		2.96
Garth Snow	Sophomore	Maine	25	1290	18	4	0	64	0	.879	2.98
Pat Mazzoli	Freshman	Ferris State	21	1202	13	7	1	64	0	.906	3.13
Jeff Levy	Freshman	New Hampshire	24	1490	15	7	2	80	0	.906	3.22
Duane Derksen	Junior	Wisconsin	42	2474	24	15	3	133	3	.880	3.23
Steve Shields	Freshman	Michigan	37	1963	26	6	3	106	0	.878	3.24

== Awards ==
=== NCAA ===
Award		Recipient
Hobey Baker Memorial Award		David Emma, Boston College
Spencer Penrose Award		Rick Comley, Northern Michigan
Most Outstanding Player in NCAA Tournament		Scott Beattie, Northern Michigan
AHCA All-American Teams
East First Team	Position	West First Team
Les Kuntar, St. Lawrence	G	Darrin Madeley, Lake Superior State
Keith Carney, Maine	D	Brad Werenka, Northern Michigan
Dan Ratushny, Cornell	D	Jason Woolley, Michigan State
David Emma, Boston College	F	Scott Beattie, Northern Michigan
Shawn McEachern, Boston University	F	Jim Dowd, Lake Superior State
Jean-Yves Roy, Maine	F	Greg Johnson, North Dakota
East Second Team	Position	West Second Team
Jeff Levy, New Hampshire	G	Bill Pye, Northern Michigan
Peter Ahola, Boston University	D	Sean Hill, Wisconsin
Ted Crowley, Boston College	D	Karl Johnston, Lake Superior State
Peter Ciavaglia, Harvard	F	Denny Felsner, Michigan
Joé Juneau, Rensselaer	F	David Roberts, Michigan
Jim Montgomery, Maine	F	Doug Weight, Lake Superior State

=== CCHA ===
Awards		Recipient
Player of the Year		Jim Dowd, Lake Superior State
Best Defensive Forward		Jeff Napierala, Lake Superior State
Best Defensive Defenseman		Karl Johnston, Lake Superior State
Best Offensive Defenseman		Jason Woolley, Michigan State
Rookie of the Year		Brian Wiseman, Michigan
Coach of the Year		Jeff Jackson, Lake Superior State
Most Valuable Player in Tournament		Clayton Beddoes, Lake Superior State
All-CCHA Teams
First Team	Position	Second Team
Darrin Madeley, Lake Superior State	G	Mike Gilmore, Michigan State
Karl Johnston, Lake Superior State	D	Mark Astley, Lake Superior State
Jason Woolley, Michigan State	D	Patrick Neaton, Michigan
Jim Dowd, Lake Superior State	F	Mike Eastwood, Western Michigan
Denny Felsner, Michigan	F	David Roberts, Michigan
Doug Weight, Lake Superior State	F	Rod Taylor, Ferris State
Rookie Team	Position	
Pat Mazzoli, Ferris State	G	
Steven Barnes, Lake Superior State	D	
Aaron Ward, Michigan	D	
Clayton Beddoes, Lake Superior State	F	
David Oliver, Michigan	F	
Brian Wiseman, Michigan	F	

=== ECAC ===
Award		Recipient
Player of the Year		Peter Ciavaglia, Harvard
Rookie of the Year		Geoff Finch, Brown
Coach of the Year		Mark Morris, Clarkson
Most Outstanding Player in Tournament		Hugo Belanger, Clarkson
All-ECAC Hockey Teams
First Team	Position	Second Team
Les Kuntar, St. Lawrence	G	Chris Rogles, Clarkson
Dan Ratushny, Cornell	D	Mike Brewer, Brown
Dave Tretowicz, Clarkson	D	Daniel Laperrière, St. Lawrence
Peter Ciavaglia, Harvard	F	Joé Juneau, Rensselaer
Ted Donato, Harvard	F	John LeClair, Vermont
Andy Pritchard, St. Lawrence	F	Mike Vukonich, Harvard
Rookie Team	Position	
Geoff Finch, Brown	G	
Mike Bracco, Dartmouth	G	
Neil Little, Rensselaer	G	
Ed Henrich, Clarkson	D	
Derek Maguire, Harvard	D	
Sean McCann, Harvard	D	
Mike McCourt, St. Lawrence	D	
Craig Conroy, Clarkson	F	
Tony DelCarmine, Dartmouth	F	
Scott Fraser, Dartmouth	F	
Rob Laferriere, Princeton	F	
Eric Lacroix, St. Lawrence	F	
Martin Leroux, Yale	F	

=== Hockey East ===
Award		Recipient
Player of the Year		David Emma, Boston College
Rookie of the Year		Jeff Levy, New Hampshire
Bob Kullen Coach of the Year Award		Dick Umile, New Hampshire
William Flynn Tournament Most Valuable Player		Shawn McEachern, Boston University
All-Hockey East Teams
First Team	Position	Second Team
Scott LaGrand, Boston College	G	Jeff Levy, New Hampshire
Keith Carney, Maine	D	Shaun Kane, Maine
Ted Crowley, Boston College	D	Rob Cowie, Northeastern
David Emma, Boston College	F	Jim Montgomery, Maine
Shawn McEachern, Boston University	F	Rob Gaudreau, Providence
Jean-Yves Roy, Maine	F	Tony Amonte, Boston University
Rookie Team	Position	
Jeff Levy, New Hampshire	G	
Scott Lachance, Boston University	D	
Chris Therien, Providence	D	
Keith Tkachuk, Boston University	F	
Mike Taylor, Northeastern	F	
Patrice Tardif, Maine	F	

=== WCHA ===
Award		Recipient
Most Valuable Player		Scott Beattie, Northern Michigan
Rookie of the Year		Tony Szabo, Northern Michigan
Student-Athlete of the Year		Brad Werenka, Northern Michigan
Coach of the Year		Rick Comley, Northern Michigan
Most Valuable Player in Tournament		Bill Pye, Northern Michigan
All-WCHA Teams
First Team	Position	Second Team
Bill Pye, Northern Michigan	G	Duane Derksen, Wisconsin
Bret Hedican, St. Cloud State	D	Jason Herter, North Dakota
Brad Werenka, Northern Michigan	D	Sean Hill, Wisconsin
Russ Romaniuk, North Dakota	F	Larry Olimb, Minnesota
Greg Johnson, North Dakota	F	Kelly Hurd, Michigan Tech
Scott Beattie, Northern Michigan	F	Dixon Ward, North Dakota
Rookie Team	Position	
Jamie Ram, Michigan Tech	G	
Chris McAlpine, Minnesota	D	
Shawn Reid, Colorado College	D	
Tony Szabo, Northern Michigan	F	
Jason Zent, Wisconsin	F	
Craig Johnson, Minnesota	F	

== 1991 NHL entry draft ==
Round	Pick	Player	College	Conference	NHL team
1	4	Scott Lachance ^{†}	Boston University	Hockey East	New York Islanders
1	5	Aaron Ward	Michigan	CCHA	Winnipeg Jets
1	11	Brian Rolston ^{†}	Lake Superior State	CCHA	New Jersey Devils
2	38	Rusty Fitzgerald ^{†}	Minnesota–Duluth	WCHA	Pittsburgh Penguins
2	39	Mike Pomichter ^{†}	Boston University	Hockey East	Chicago Blackhawks
2	43	Craig Darby ^{†}	Providence	Hockey East	Montreal Canadiens
3	46	Rich Brennan ^{†}	Boston University	Hockey East	Quebec Nordiques
3	51	Sean Pronger	Bowling Green	CCHA	Vancouver Canucks
3	53	Todd Hall ^{†}	Boston College	Hockey East	Hartford Whalers
3	56	George Breen ^{†}	Providence	Hockey East	Edmonton Oilers
3	63	Brian Caruso	Minnesota–Duluth	WCHA	Calgary Flames
4	68	Dave Karpa	Ferris State	CCHA	Quebec Nordiques
4	75	Jim Storm	Michigan Tech	WCHA	Hartford Whalers
4	76	Mike Knuble ^{†}	Michigan	CCHA	Detroit Red Wings
4	77	Brad Willner ^{†}	Lake Superior State	CCHA	New Jersey Devils
4	79	Keith Redmond	Bowling Green	CCHA	Washington Capitals
4	82	Joe Tamminen ^{†}	Minnesota–Duluth	WCHA	Pittsburgh Penguins
4	83	Sylvain Lapointe	Clarkson	ECAC Hockey	Montreal Canadiens
4	86	Aris Brimanis	Bowling Green	CCHA	Philadelphia Flyers
5	93	Ryan Haggerty ^{†}	Boston College	Hockey East	Edmonton Oilers
5	96	Corey Machanic	Vermont	ECAC Hockey	New York Rangers
5	100	Brad Layzell	Rensselaer	ECAC Hockey	Montreal Canadiens
5	101	Steve Shields	Michigan	CCHA	Buffalo Sabres
5	107	Jerome Butler ^{†}	Minnesota–Duluth	WCHA	Calgary Flames
5	109	Jeff Callinan ^{†}	Minnesota	WCHA	St. Louis Blues
5	110	Maco Balkovec ^{†}	Wisconsin	WCHA	Chicago Blackhawks
6	114	Rob Valicevic ^{†}	Lake Superior State	CCHA	New York Islanders
6	119	Mike Harding ^{†}	Northern Michigan	WCHA	Hartford Whalers
6	124	Brian Holzinger ^{†}	Bowling Green	CCHA	Buffalo Sabres
6	126	Brian Clifford ^{†}	Michigan State	CCHA	Pittsburgh Penguins
6	129	Bobby Marshall	Miami	CCHA	Calgary Flames
6	131	Bruce Gardiner	Colgate	ECAC Hockey	St. Louis Blues
6	132	Jacques Auger	Wisconsin	WCHA	Chicago Blackhawks
7	137	Geoff Finch	Brown	ECAC Hockey	Minnesota North Stars
7	141	Brian Mueller ^{†}	Clarkson	ECAC Hockey	Hartford Whalers
7	144	David Oliver	Michigan	CCHA	Edmonton Oilers
7	147	John Rushin ^{†}	Notre Dame	Independent	New York Rangers
7	149	Brady Kramer ^{†}	Providence	Hockey East	Montreal Canadiens
7	151	Kelly Harper	Michigan State	CCHA	Calgary Flames
7	152	Kelly Fairchild ^{†}	Wisconsin	WCHA	Los Angeles Kings
7	154	Scott Kirton ^{†}	North Dakota	WCHA	Chicago Blackhawks
8	155	Dean Grillo ^{†}	North Dakota	WCHA	San Jose Sharks
8	157	Aaron Asp	Ferris State	CCHA	Quebec Nordiques
8	161	Eric Johnson ^{†}	St. Cloud State	WCHA	Vancouver Canucks
8	164	Robb McIntyre ^{†}	Ferris State	CCHA	Toronto Maple Leafs
8	166	Gary Kitching ^{†}	Ferris State	CCHA	Edmonton Oilers
8	170	Peter McLaughlin ^{†}	Harvard	ECAC Hockey	Pittsburgh Penguins
8	171	Brian Savage	Miami	CCHA	Montreal Canadiens
8	172	Jay Moser ^{†}	St. Cloud State	WCHA	Boston Bruins
8	174	Michael Burkett	Michigan State	CCHA	Minnesota North Stars
8	175	Chris Kenady ^{†}	Denver	WCHA	St. Louis Blues
9	177	Corwin Saurdiff ^{†}	Northern Michigan	WCHA	San Jose Sharks
9	178	Adam Bartell ^{†}	Rensselaer	ECAC Hockey	Quebec Nordiques
9	184	Derek Herlofsky ^{†}	Boston University	Hockey East	Minnesota North Stars
9	185	Chris Belanger	Western Michigan	CCHA	Hartford Whalers
9	187	Dan Reimann ^{†}	St. Cloud State	WCHA	New Jersey Devils
9	188	Brent Brekke	Western Michigan	CCHA	Quebec Nordiques
9	192	Jeff Lembke ^{†}	North Dakota	WCHA	Pittsburgh Penguins
9	193	Scott Fraser	Dartmouth	ECAC Hockey	Montreal Canadiens
9	194	Dan Hodge	Merrimack	Hockey East	Boston Bruins
9	196	Craig Brown	Western Michigan	CCHA	Los Angeles Kings
9	197	Jed Fiebelkorn ^{†}	Minnesota	WCHA	St. Louis Blues
9	198	Scott MacDonald ^{†}	Vermont	ECAC Hockey	Chicago Blackhawks
10	200	Paul Koch ^{†}	Denver	WCHA	Quebec Nordiques
10	202	Rob Canavan ^{†}	Boston College	Hockey East	New York Islanders
10	204	Josh Bartell ^{†}	Clarkson	ECAC Hockey	Philadelphia Flyers
10	207	Jason Currie	Clarkson	ECAC Hockey	Hartford Whalers
10	211	Spencer Meany	St. Lawrence	ECAC Hockey	Buffalo Sabres
10	213	Jamie Ram	Michigan Tech	WCHA	New York Rangers
10	214	Chris Tok ^{†}	Wisconsin	WCHA	Pittsburgh Penguins
10	216	Steve Norton	Michigan State	CCHA	Boston Bruins
10	219	Chris MacKenzie	Colgate	ECAC Hockey	St. Louis Blues
11	221	Aaron Kriss ^{†}	Lowell	Hockey East	San Jose Sharks
11	222	Doug Friedman	Boston University	Hockey East	Quebec Nordiques
11	223	Jonathan Kelley ^{†}	Princeton	ECAC Hockey	Toronto Maple Leafs
11	225	Jason Jennings	Western Michigan	CCHA	Winnipeg Jets
11	226	Neil Little	Rensselaer	ECAC Hockey	Philadelphia Flyers
11	229	Mike Santonelli	Northeastern	Hockey East	Hartford Whalers
11	230	Bart Turner	Michigan State	CCHA	Detroit Red Wings
11	237	P. J. Lepler ^{†}	St. Cloud State	WCHA	Montreal Canadiens
11	238	Steve Lombardi ^{†}	Yale	ECAC Hockey	Boston Bruins
11	241	Kevin Rappana ^{†}	North Dakota	WCHA	St. Louis Blues
11	242	Mike Larkin ^{†}	Vermont	ECAC Hockey	Chicago Blackhawks
12	245	Chris O'Rourke	Alaska–Fairbanks	Independent	Toronto Maple Leafs
12	246	Marty Schriner	North Dakota	WCHA	New York Islanders
12	249	Xavier Majic	Rensselaer	ECAC Hockey	Vancouver Canucks
12	251	Rob Peters	Ohio State	CCHA	Hartford Whalers
12	252	Andrew Miller ^{†}	Miami	CCHA	Detroit Red Wings
12	253	Jason Hehr ^{†}	Northern Michigan	WCHA	New Jersey Devils
12	255	Michael Smith	Lake Superior State	CCHA	Buffalo Sabres
12	257	Brian Wiseman	Michigan	CCHA	New York Rangers
12	259	Dale Hooper ^{†}	Massachusetts	Independent	Montreal Canadiens
12	262	Michael Gaul	St. Lawrence	ECAC Hockey	Los Angeles Kings
12	263	Mike Veisor ^{†}	Northeastern	Hockey East	St. Louis Blues
12	264	Scott Dean ^{†}	Michigan State	CCHA	Chicago Blackhawks

† incoming freshman

== See also ==
- 1990–91 NCAA Division III men's ice hockey season
