= 1996–97 AHL season =

- League: American Hockey League
- Sport: Ice hockey

Regular season
- F. G. "Teddy" Oke Trophy: Worcester IceCats
- Season MVP: Jean-Francois Labbe
- Top scorer: Peter White

Playoffs
- Playoffs MVP: Mike McHugh

Calder Cup
- Champions: Hershey Bears
- Runners-up: Hamilton Bulldogs

AHL seasons
- 1995–96 1997–98

The 1996–97 AHL season was the 61st season of the American Hockey League. The league renames its divisions due to relocating teams. The Northern Conferences consists of the Atlantic Division becoming the Canadian Division, and the Central Division becoming the Empire State Division. The Southern Conferences consists of the North Division becoming the New England Division, and the South Division becoming the Mid-Atlantic Division.

Eighteen teams played 80 games each in the schedule. The Philadelphia Phantoms finished first overall in the regular season. The Hershey Bears won their eighth Calder Cup championship.

== Team changes ==
- The Prince Edward Island Senators suspend operations, becoming dormant.
- The Cornwall Aces suspend operations, becoming dormant.
- The Cape Breton Oilers move to Hamilton, Ontario, becoming the Hamilton Bulldogs, playing in the Canadian division.
- The Kentucky Thoroughblades join the AHL as an expansion team, based in Lexington, Kentucky, playing in the Mid-Atlantic division.
- The Philadelphia Phantoms join the AHL as an expansion team, based in Philadelphia, Pennsylvania, playing in the Mid-Atlantic division.
- The Binghamton Rangers switch from the South division to the Empire State division.

== Final standings ==
- y– indicates team clinched division and a playoff spot
- x– indicates team clinched a playoff spot
- e– indicates team was eliminated from playoff contention

=== Northern Conference ===
Canadian Division	GP	W	L	T	OTL	Pts	GF	GA
y–St. John's Maple Leafs (TOR)	80	36	28	10	6	88	265	264
x–Saint John Flames (CGY)	80	28	36	13	3	72	237	269
x–Hamilton Bulldogs (EDM)	80	28	39	9	4	69	220	276
e–Fredericton Canadiens (MTL)	80	26	44	8	2	62	234	283

Empire State Division	GP	W	L	T	OTL	Pts	GF	GA
y–Rochester Americans (BUF)	80	40	30	9	1	90	298	257
x–Adirondack Red Wings (DET/TBL)	80	38	28	12	2	90	258	249
x–Albany River Rats (NJD)	80	38	28	9	5	90	269	231
x–Syracuse Crunch (VAN)	80	32	38	10	0	74	241	265
x–Binghamton Rangers (NYR)	80	27	38	13	2	69	245	300

=== Southern Conference ===
New England Division	GP	W	L	T	OTL	Pts	GF	GA
y–Worcester IceCats (OTT/STL)	80	43	23	9	5	100	256	234
x–Springfield Falcons (HFD/PHX)	80	41	25	12	2	96	268	229
x–Portland Pirates (WSH)	80	37	26	10	7	91	279	264
x–Providence Bruins (BOS)	80	35	40	3	2	75	262	289

Mid-Atlantic Division	GP	W	L	T	OTL	Pts	GF	GA
y–Philadelphia Phantoms (PHI)	80	49	18	10	3	111	325	230
x–Hershey Bears (COL)	80	43	22	10	5	101	273	220
x–Kentucky Thoroughblades (SJS)	80	36	35	9	0	81	278	284
x–Baltimore Bandits (ANA)	80	30	37	10	3	73	251	285
e–Carolina Monarchs (FLA)	80	28	43	4	5	65	273	303

== Scoring leaders ==
Note: GP = Games played; G = Goals; A = Assists; Pts = Points; PIM = Penalty minutes

Player	Team	GP	G	A	Pts	PIM
Peter White	Philadelphia Phantoms	80	44	61	105	28
Terry Yake	Rochester Americans	78	34	67	101	77
Brian Wiseman	St. John's Maple Leafs	71	33	62	95	83
Vaclav Prospal	Philadelphia Phantoms	63	32	63	95	70
Patrik Juhlin	Philadelphia Phantoms	78	31	60	91	24
Aleksey Lozhkin	Fredericton Canadiens	79	33	56	89	41
Gilbert Dionne	Carolina Monarchs	72	41	47	88	69
Blair Atcheynum	Hershey Bears	77	42	45	87	57
Jan Caloun	Kentucky Thoroughblades	66	43	43	86	68
Shawn McCosh	Philadelphia Phantoms	79	30	51	81	110

- complete list

== Calder Cup playoffs ==
Division Semifinals	Division Finals
C1	St. John's	3
E5	Binghamton	1
C1	St. John's	3
Canadian Division
C3	Hamilton	4
C2	Saint John	2
C3	Hamilton	3
Northern Conference
E1	Rochester	3
E4	Syracuse	0
E1	Rochester	3
Empire State Division
E3	Albany	4
E2	Adirondack	1
E3	Albany	3
N1	Worcester	2
N4	Providence	3
N4	Providence	1
New England Division
N2	Springfield	4
N2	Springfield	3
N3	Portland	2
Southern Conference
M1	Philadelphia	3
M4	Baltimore	0
M1	Philadelphia	3
Mid-Atlantic Division
M2	Hershey	4
M2	Hershey	3
M3	Kentucky	1

Conference Finals
C3	Hamilton	4
E3	Albany	1
N2	Springfield	3
M2	Hershey	4

Calder Cup Final
C3	Hamilton	1
M2	Hershey	4

== All Star Classic ==
The 10th AHL All-Star Game was played on January 16, 1997, at the Harbour Station in Saint John, New Brunswick. Team World defeated Team Canada 3–2 in a shootout. In the skills competition held the day before the All-Star Game, Team World won 18–9 over Team Canada.

== Trophy and award winners ==
=== Team awards ===
Calder Cup; Playoff champions:	Hershey Bears
Richard F. Canning Trophy; Northern Conference playoff champions:	Hamilton Bulldogs
Robert W. Clarke Trophy; Southern Conference playoff champions:	Hershey Bears
Frank Mathers Trophy; Regular season champions, Mid-Atlantic Division:	Philadelphia Phantoms
F. G. "Teddy" Oke Trophy; Regular season champions, New England Division:	Worcester IceCats
Sam Pollock Trophy; Regular season champions, Canadian Division:	St. John's Maple Leafs
John D. Chick Trophy; Regular season champions, Empire State Division:	Rochester Americans

=== Individual awards ===
Les Cunningham Award; Most valuable player:	Jean-Francois Labbe – Hershey Bears
John B. Sollenberger Trophy; Top point scorer:	Peter White – Philadelphia Phantoms
Dudley "Red" Garrett Memorial Award; Rookie of the year:	Jaroslav Svejkovsky – Portland Pirates
Eddie Shore Award; Defenceman of the year:	Darren Rumble – Philadelphia Phantoms
Aldege "Baz" Bastien Memorial Award; Best goaltender:	Jean-Francois Labbe – Hershey Bears
Harry "Hap" Holmes Memorial Award; Lowest goals against average:	Jean-Francois Labbe – Hershey Bears
Louis A. R. Pieri Memorial Award; Coach of the year:	Greg Gilbert – Worcester IceCats
Fred T. Hunt Memorial Award; Sportsmanship / Perseverance:	Steve Passmore – Hamilton Bulldogs
Jack A. Butterfield Trophy; MVP of the playoffs:	Mike McHugh – Hershey Bears

=== Other awards ===
James C. Hendy Memorial Award; Most outstanding executive:	Jay Feaster, Hershey Bears
James H. Ellery Memorial Awards; Outstanding media coverage:	Lindsay Kramer, Syracuse, (newspaper); Aaron Kennedy, Saint John, (radio); Jim Ogle, Kentucky, (television)
Ken McKenzie Award; Outstanding marketing executive:	Glenn Stanford, St. John's Maple Leafs & Carole Appleton, Springfield Falcons

== See also ==
- List of AHL seasons

Preceded by 1995–96 AHL season	AHL seasons	Succeeded by 1997–98 AHL season
