= 1995–96 AHL season =

- League: American Hockey League
- Sport: Ice hockey

Regular season
- F. G. "Teddy" Oke Trophy: Springfield Falcons
- Season MVP: Brad Smyth
- Top scorer: Brad Smyth

Playoffs
- Playoffs MVP: Dixon Ward

Calder Cup
- Champions: Rochester Americans
- Runners-up: Portland Pirates

AHL seasons
- 1994–95 1996–97

The 1995–96 AHL season was the 60th season of the American Hockey League. The AHL expanded by two teams and realigned into two conferences, and four divisions. The Northern Conference includes the North and Atlantic Divisions. The Southern Conference include the South Division and the newly created Central Division.

The league introduces two new trophies for division champions of the regular season. The Frank Mathers Trophy is first awarded for the south division, and the Sam Pollock Trophy is first awarded for the atlantic Division. The John D. Chick Trophy becomes awarded to the central division.

The AHL revives awarding points for overtime losses, last awarded in the 1987–88 AHL season. Eighteen teams played 80 games each in the schedule. The Albany River Rats finished first overall in the regular season. The Rochester Americans won their sixth Calder Cup championship.

== Team changes ==
- The Baltimore Bandits join the AHL as an expansion team, based in Baltimore, Maryland, playing in the South Division.
- The Carolina Monarchs join the AHL as an expansion team, based in Greensboro, North Carolina, playing in the South Division.
- The Cornwall Aces, Rochester Americans, and Syracuse Crunch switch from the South Division to the new Central Division.
- The Adirondack Red Wings and Albany River Rats switch from the North Division to the new Central Division.

== Final standings ==
- y– indicates team clinched division and a playoff spot
- x– indicates team clinched a playoff spot
- e– indicates team was eliminated from playoff contention

=== Northern Conference ===
Atlantic Division	GP	W	L	T	OTL	Pts	GF	GA
y–Prince Edward Island Senators (OTT)	80	38	33	6	3	85	303	313
x–Saint John Flames (CGY)	80	35	30	11	4	85	272	264
x–St. John's Maple Leafs (TOR)	80	31	31	14	4	80	248	274
x–Fredericton Canadiens (MTL)	80	34	35	11	0	79	307	308
e–Cape Breton Oilers (EDM)	80	33	40	3	4	73	290	323

North Division	GP	W	L	T	OTL	Pts	GF	GA
y–Springfield Falcons (HFD/WIN)	80	42	22	11	5	100	272	215
x–Worcester IceCats (STL)	80	36	28	12	4	88	242	244
x–Portland Pirates (WSH)	80	32	34	10	4	78	282	283
x–Providence Bruins (BOS)	80	30	36	10	4	74	249	280

=== Southern Conference ===
Central Division	GP	W	L	T	OTL	Pts	GF	GA
y–Albany River Rats (NJD)	80	54	19	7	0	115	322	218
x–Adirondack Red Wings (DET)	80	38	32	8	2	86	271	247
x–Rochester Americans (BUF)	80	37	34	5	4	83	294	297
x–Cornwall Aces (COL)	80	34	34	7	5	80	249	251
x–Syracuse Crunch (VAN)	80	31	37	5	7	74	257	307

South Division	GP	W	L	T	OTL	Pts	GF	GA
y–Binghamton Rangers (NYR)	80	39	31	7	3	88	333	331
x–Hershey Bears (PHI)	80	36	30	11	3	86	301	287
x–Baltimore Bandits (ANA)	80	33	36	9	2	77	279	299
e–Carolina Monarchs (FLA)	80	28	38	11	3	70	313	343

== Scoring leaders ==
Note: GP = Games played; G = Goals; A = Assists; Pts = Points; PIM = Penalty minutes

Player	Team	GP	G	A	Pts	PIM
Brad Smyth	Carolina Monarchs	68	68	58	126	80
Jim Montgomery	Hershey Bears	78	34	71	105	95
Mike Casselman	Carolina Monarchs	70	34	68	102	46
Gilbert Dionne	Carolina Monarchs	55	43	58	101	29
Peter Ferraro	Binghamton Rangers	68	48	53	101	157
Chris Ferraro	Binghamton Rangers	77	32	67	99	208
Craig Charron	Rochester Americans	72	43	52	95	79
Jean-Yves Roy	Prince Edward Island Senators	67	40	55	95	64
Dixon Ward	Rochester Americans	71	38	56	94	74
Brett Harkins	Carolina Monarchs	55	23	71	94	44
Andrew Brunette	Portland Pirates	69	28	66	94	125

- complete list

== Calder Cup playoffs ==
Division Semifinals	Division Finals
A1	P.E.I.	2
A4	Fredericton	3
A4	Fredericton	1
Atlantic Division
A2	Saint John	4
A2	Saint John	3
A3	St. John's	1
Northern Conference
N1	Springfield	3
N4	Providence	1
N1	Springfield	2
North Division
N3	Portland	4
N2	Worcester	1
N3	Portland	3
C1	Albany	1
C4	Cornwall	3
C4	Cornwall	0
Central Division
C3	Rochester	4
C2	Adirondack	0
C3	Rochester	3
Southern Conference
S1	Binghamton	1
C5	Syracuse	3
C5	Syracuse	4
South Division
S3	Baltimore	3
S2	Hershey	2
S3	Baltimore	3

Conference Finals
A2	Saint John	3
N3	Portland	4
C3	Rochester	4
C5	Syracuse	1

Calder Cup Final
N3	Portland	3
C3	Rochester	4

== All Star Classic ==
The 9th AHL All-Star Game was played on January 16, 1996, at the Hersheypark Arena in Hershey, Pennsylvania. Team USA defeated Team Canada 6–5. In the inaugural AHL skills competition held the day before the All-Star Game, Team USA won 14–12 over Team Canada.

== Trophy and award winners ==
=== Team Awards ===
Calder Cup; Playoff champions:	Rochester Americans
Richard F. Canning Trophy; Northern Conference playoff champions:	Portland Pirates
Robert W. Clarke Trophy; Southern Conference playoff champions:	Rochester Americans
Frank Mathers Trophy; Regular Season champions, South Division:	Binghamton Rangers
F. G. "Teddy" Oke Trophy; Regular Season champions, North Division:	Springfield Falcons
Sam Pollock Trophy; Regular Season champions, Atlantic Division:	Prince Edward Island Senators
John D. Chick Trophy; Regular Season champions, Central Division:	Albany River Rats

=== Individual awards ===
Les Cunningham Award; Most valuable player:	Brad Smyth - Carolina Monarchs
John B. Sollenberger Trophy; Top point scorer:	Brad Smyth - Carolina Monarchs
Dudley "Red" Garrett Memorial Award; Rookie of the year:	Darcy Tucker - Fredericton Canadiens
Eddie Shore Award; Defenceman of the year:	Barry Richter - Binghamton Rangers
Aldege "Baz" Bastien Memorial Award; Best Goaltender:	Manny Legace - Springfield Falcons
Harry "Hap" Holmes Memorial Award; Lowest goals against average:	Manny Legace & Scott Langkow - Springfield Falcons
Louis A.R. Pieri Memorial Award; Coach of the year:	Robbie Ftorek - Albany River Rats
Fred T. Hunt Memorial Award; Sportsmanship / Perseverance:	Ken Gernander - Binghamton Rangers
Jack A. Butterfield Trophy; MVP of the playoffs:	Dixon Ward - Rochester Americans

=== Other awards ===
James C. Hendy Memorial Award; Most outstanding executive:	Steve Donner, Rochester Americans
James H. Ellery Memorial Awards; Outstanding media coverage:	Kevin Oklobzija, Rochester, (newspaper); Seth Everett, Syracuse, (radio); Tom Caron, New England Sports Network, (television)
Ken McKenzie Award; Outstanding marketing executive:	Tim Kuhl, Syracuse Crunch

== See also ==
- List of AHL seasons

Preceded by 1994–95 AHL season	AHL seasons	Succeeded by 1996–97 AHL season
