= Chinese as a foreign language =

Chinese as a foreign or second language is when non-native speakers study Chinese varieties. The increased interest in China from those outside has led to a corresponding interest in the study of Standard Chinese (standardized form of Mandarin) as a foreign language, the official language of China, Taiwan and Singapore. However, the teaching of Chinese both within and outside China is not a recent phenomenon. Westerners began learning different Chinese varieties in the 16th century. Within China, Mandarin became the official language in the early 20th century. Mandarin also became the official language of Taiwan when the Kuomintang took over control from Japan after World War II.

In 2010, 750,000 people (670,000 from overseas) took the Chinese Proficiency Test. For comparison, in 2005, 117,660 non-native speakers took the test, an increase of 26.52% from 2004. From 2000 to 2004, the number of students in England, Wales and Northern Ireland taking Advanced Level exams in Chinese increased by 57%. An independent school in the UK made Chinese one of their compulsory subjects for study in 2006. The study of Chinese is also rising in the United States. The USC's U.S.–China Institute cited a report that 51,582 students were studying the language in US colleges and universities. While far behind the more than 800,000 students who study Spanish, the number is more than three times higher than in 1986. The Institute's report includes graphs and details on the popularity of other languages.

As of 2008, China had helped 60,000 teachers promote its language internationally, and an estimated 40 million people were studying Chinese as a second language around the world.

Other than Standard Chinese, Cantonese is also widely taught as a foreign language. It is the de facto official language of Hong Kong and Macau and has traditionally been the dominant language among most overseas Chinese communities. A number of universities outside Hong Kong and Macau offer Cantonese within their Chinese-language departments as well, especially in the UK and North America. Taiwanese Hokkien is taught at the International Chinese Language Program, Taipei Language Institute and other schools.

== History ==
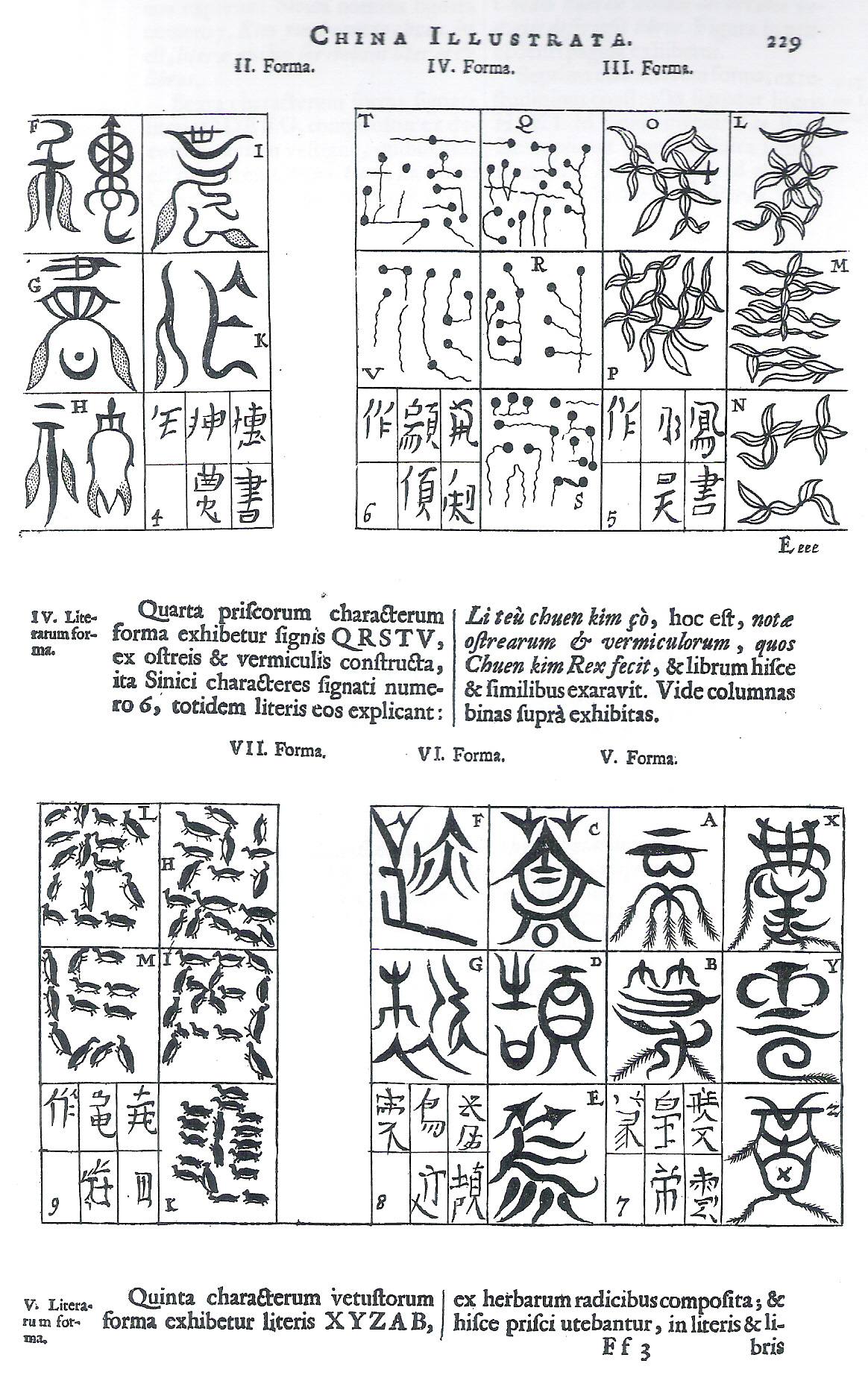
The fanciful Chinese scripts shown in Kircher's China Illustrata (1667). Kircher divides Chinese characters into 16 types, and argues that each type originates from a type of images taken from the natural world.

The interpretation of the Chinese language in the West began with some misunderstandings. Since the earliest appearance of Chinese characters in the West, the belief that written Chinese was ideographic prevailed. Such a belief led to Athanasius Kircher's conjecture that Chinese characters were derived from the Egyptian hieroglyphs, China being a colony of Egypt. John Webb, the British architect, went a step further. In a Biblical vein similar to Kircher's, he tried to demonstrate that Chinese was the Primitive or Adamic language. In his An Historical Essay Endeavoring a Probability That the Language of the Empire of China Is the Primitive Language (1669), he suggested that Chinese was the language spoken before the confusion of tongues.

Inspired by these ideas, Leibniz and Bacon, among others, dreamt of inventing a characteristica universalis modelled on Chinese. Thus wrote Bacon:

it is the use of China and the kingdoms of the High Levant to write in Characters Real, which express neither letters nor words in gross, but Things or Notions...

Leibniz placed high hopes on the Chinese characters:

I thought that someday, perhaps one could accommodate these characters, if one were well informed of them, not just for representing the characters as they are ordinarily made, but both for calculating and aiding imagination and meditation in a way that would amazingly strike the spirit of these people and would give us a new means of teaching and mastering them.

The serious study of the language in the West began with missionaries coming to China during the late 16th century. Among the first were the Italian Jesuits, Michele Ruggieri and Matteo Ricci. They mastered the language without the aid of any grammar books or dictionaries, and are often viewed as the first Western sinologists. Ruggieri set up a school in Macau, which was the first for teaching foreigners Chinese and translated part of the Great Learning into Latin. This was the first translation of a Confucian classic into any European language. He also wrote a religious tract in Chinese, the first Chinese book written by a Westerner. Matteo Ricci brought Western sciences to China, and became a prolific Chinese writer. With his wide command of the language, Ricci impressed the Chinese literati and was accepted as one of them, much to the advantage of his missionary work. Several scientific works he authored or co-authored were collected in the Complete Library of the Four Treasuries, the imperial collection of Chinese classics. Some of his religious works were listed in the collection's bibliography, but not collected.

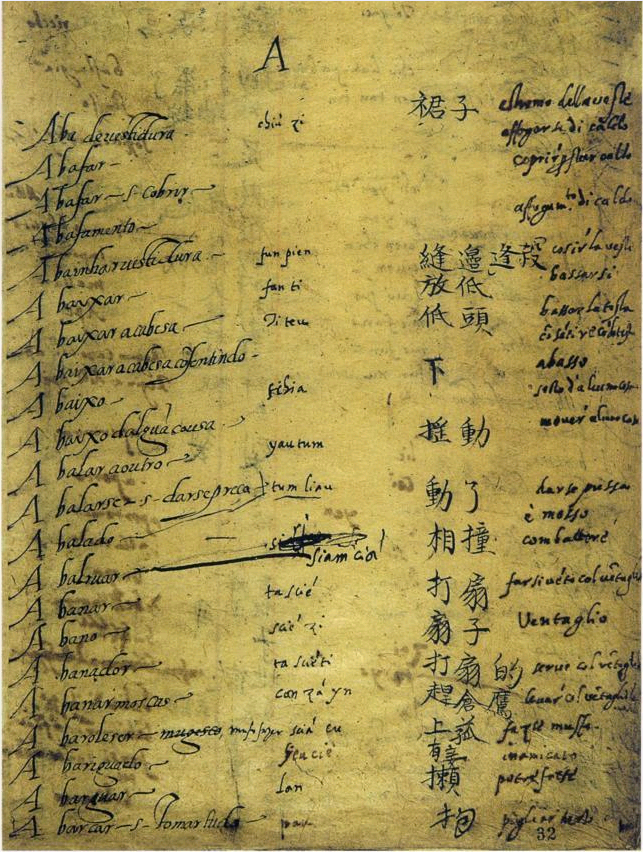
Page from the Portuguese-Chinese dictionary manuscript by Ricci, Ruggieri, and Fernandez (1583-88)

Ricci and Ruggieri, with the help of the Chinese Jesuit Lay Brother Sebastiano Fernandez (also spelled Fernandes; 1562–1621), are thought to have created the first Portuguese-Chinese dictionary some time between 1583 and 1588. Later, while travelling on the Grand Canal of China from Beijing to Linqing during the winter of 1598, Ricci, with the help of Lazzaro Cattaneo (1560–1640) and Sebastiano Fernandez, also compiled a Chinese-Portuguese dictionary. In this latter work, thanks to Cattaneo's musical ear, a system was introduced for marking the tones of romanized Chinese syllables with diacritical marks. The distinction between aspirated and unaspirated consonants was also made clear through the use of apostrophes, as in the much later Wade-Giles system. Although neither of the two dictionaries were published—the former only came to light in the Vatican Secret Archives in 1934, and saw publication in 2001, while the latter has not been found so far—Ricci made the transcription system developed in 1598, and in 1626 it was finally published, with minor modifications, by another Jesuit Nicolas Trigault in a guide for new Jesuit missionaries. The system continued to be in wide use throughout the 17th and 18th century. It can be seen in several Romanized Chinese texts (prepared mostly by Michael Boym and his Chinese collaborators) that appeared in Athanasius Kircher's China Illustrata.

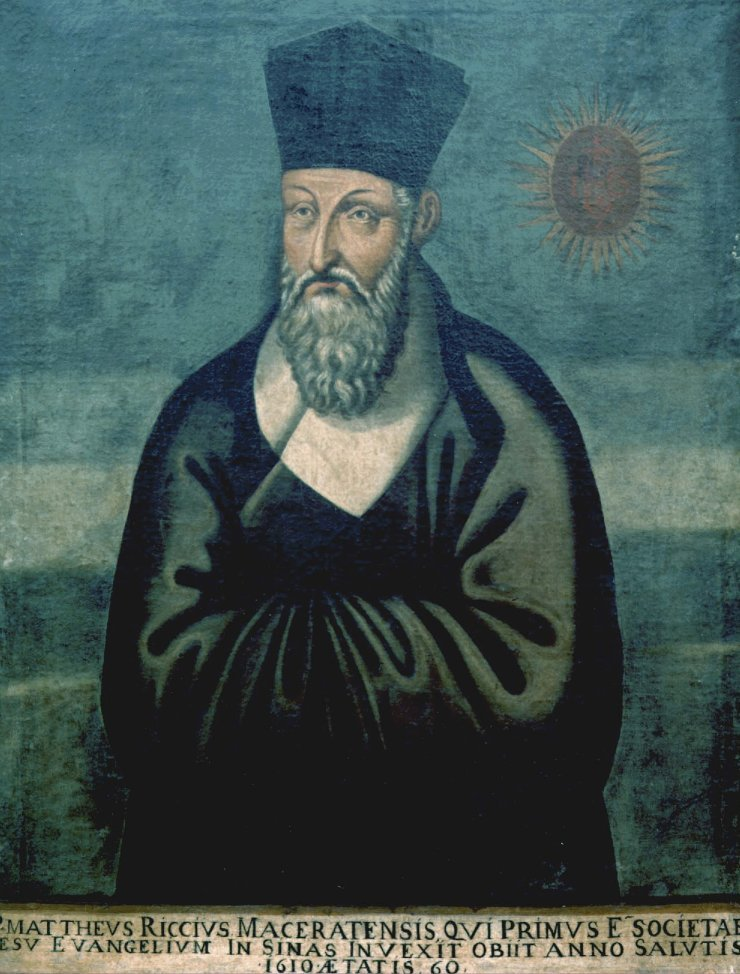
Matteo Ricci, one of the first Westerners to learn the Chinese language

The earliest Chinese grammars were produced by the Spanish Dominican missionaries. The earliest surviving one is by Francisco Varo (1627–1687). His Arte de la Lengua Mandarina was published in Canton in 1703. This grammar was only sketchy, however. The first important Chinese grammar was Joseph Henri Marie de Prémare's Notitia linguae sinicae, completed in 1729 but only published in Malacca in 1831. Other important grammar texts followed, from Jean-Pierre Abel-Rémusat's Élémens (sic) de la grammaire chinoise in 1822 to Georg von der Gabelentz's Chinesische Grammatik in 1881. Glossaries for Chinese circulated among the missionaries from early on. Robert Morrison's A Dictionary of the Chinese Language (1815-1823), noted for its fine printing, is one of the first important Chinese dictionaries for the use of Westerners.

Due to the status of Guangzhou as the only Chinese port open to foreign trade and exchange in the 1700s, Cantonese became the variety of Chinese that came into the most interaction with the Western world in early modern times. Foreign works on Chinese were largely centered around this variant until the opening up of other Chinese regions for commerce through unequal treaties, which exposed European scholars to a much larger number of Chinese varieties.

In 1814, a chair of Chinese and Manchu was founded at the Collège de France, and Abel-Rémusat became the first Professor of Chinese in Europe. In 1837, Nikita Bichurin opened the first European Chinese-language school in the Russian Empire. Since then sinology became an academic discipline in the West, with the secular sinologists outnumbering the missionary ones. Some of the big names in the history of linguistics took up the study of Chinese. Sir William Jones dabbled in it; instigated by Abel-Rémusat, Wilhelm von Humboldt studied the language seriously, and discussed it in several letters with the French professor.

Local Chinese variants were still widely used up until a Qing dynasty decree in 1909 that mandated Mandarin as the official language of China. After this period, only Cantonese and Mandarin remained as the most influential variants of Chinese, the former due to the importance of maritime trade in Guangzhou and the emergence of Hong Kong as a key economy in East Asia. Chinese departments in the West were largely centered on Cantonese due to British colonial rule over Hong Kong until the opening of communist-ruled China starting in the 1970s.

The teaching of Chinese as a foreign language in the People's Republic of China started in 1950 at Tsinghua University, initially serving students from Eastern Europe. Starting with Bulgaria in 1952, China also dispatched Chinese teachers abroad, and by the early 1960s had sent teachers afar as the Congo, Cambodia, Yemen and France. In 1962, with the approval of the State Council, the Higher Preparatory School for Foreign Students was set up, later renamed the Beijing Language and Culture University. The programs were disrupted for several years during the Cultural Revolution.

According to the Chinese Ministry of Education, there are 330 institutions teaching Mandarin Chinese as a foreign language, receiving about 40,000 foreign students. In addition, there are almost 5,000 Chinese language teachers. Since 1992 the State Education Commission has managed a Chinese language proficiency exam program, which tests has been taken around 100 million times (including by domestic ethnic minority candidates).

Within China's Guangdong Province, Cantonese is also offered in some schools as optional or extra-curricular courses in select Chinese-as-a-foreign-language programs, although many require students to be proficient in Mandarin first.

== Difficulty ==
Chinese is rated as one of the most difficult languages to learn for people whose native language is English, together with Arabic, Japanese and Korean. According to the Foreign Service Institute, a native English speaker needs over 2,200 hours of intensive study, taking 88 weeks (one year and about 8 months), to learn Mandarin. A quote attributed to William Milne, Morrison's colleague, goes that learning Chinese is

a work for men with bodies of brass, lungs of steel, heads of oak, hands of springsteel, hearts of apostles, memories of angels, and lives of Methuselah.

Two major difficulties stand out: characters and tones.

=== Characters ===
Chinese characters' graphy and other intralexical aspects largely increase the information load to master for English speakers.

While English uses an alphabet, Chinese uses hanzi, or Chinese characters, as its writing system. The Kangxi dictionary contains 47,035 characters (simplified Chinese: 汉字; traditional Chinese: 漢字; pinyin: Hànzì). However, most of the characters contained there are archaic and obscure. The Chart of Common Characters of Modern Chinese (simplified Chinese: 现代汉语常用字表; traditional Chinese: 現代漢語常用字表; pinyin: Xiàndài Hànyǔ Chángyòng Zì Biǎo), promulgated in the People's Republic of China, lists 2,500 common characters and 1,000 less-than-common characters, while the Chart of Generally Utilized Characters of Modern Chinese (simplified Chinese: 现代汉语通用字表; traditional Chinese: 現代漢語通用字表; pinyin: Xiàndài Hànyǔ Tōngyòng Zì Biǎo) lists 7,000 characters, including the 3,500 characters already listed above.

In his 1991 article "Why Chinese is So Damn Hard", David Moser states that an English speaker would find the "ridiculous" writing system "unreasonably hard to learn" to the level of achieving literacy due to the large number of characters. Moser argued that he was unable to "comfortably read" a newspaper even though he knew 2,000 characters.

The 17th-century Protestant theologian Elias Grebniz, said that Chinese characters were:

through God's fate introduced by the devil / so he may keep those miserable people ever more entangled in the darkness of idolatry.

In Gautier's novella Fortunio, a Chinese professor from the Collège de France, when asked by the protagonist to translate a love letter suspected to be written in Chinese, replied that the characters in the letter happen to all belong to that half of the 40,000 characters which he has yet to master.

The overwhelming majority of characters contain phonetic parts, but their use is complicated by several factors. Firstly, Chinese characters have been in use since before English was written but have seen very little orthographic reform to align them with how Chinese changed over time. Secondly, in Mainland China, phonetic parts have been removed from some characters in order to make handwriting faster. Thirdly, there are characters that have different readings depending on the word; the Japanese writing system suffers from the same issues.

=== Tones ===
Mandarin Chinese has four tones (simplified Chinese: 声调; traditional Chinese: 聲調; pinyin: shēngdiào), namely the first tone (flat or high level tone, 阴平, denoted by " ¯ " in Pinyin), the second tone (rising or high-rising tone, 阳平, denoted by " ˊ " in Pinyin), the third tone (falling-rising or low tone, 上声, denoted by " ˇ " in Pinyin), and the fourth tone (falling or high-falling tone, 去声, denoted by " ˋ " in Pinyin). There is also a fifth tone called neutral (轻声, denoted as no-mark in Pinyin) although the official name of the tones is Four Tones. Many other Chinese dialects have more, for example, Cantonese has six (often numbered as nine, but three are duplicates). In most Western languages, tones are only used to express emphasis or emotion, not to distinguish meanings as in Chinese. A French Jesuit, in a letter, relates how the Chinese tones cause a problem for understanding:

I will give you an example of their words. They told me chou [shu in modern Pinyin] signifies a book: so that I thought whenever the word chou was pronounced, a book was the subject. Not at all! Chou, the next time I heard it, I found signified a tree. Now I was to recollect, chou was a book, or a tree. But this amounted to nothing; chou, I found, expressed also great heats; chou is to relate; chou is the Aurora; chou means to be accustomed; chou expresses the loss of a wager, &c. I should not finish, were I to attempt to give you all its significations.

Moser also stated that tones were a contributing factor to the difficulty of learning Chinese, partly because it is difficult for non-native learners to use Chinese intonation whilst retaining the correct tones.

== Sources of education ==
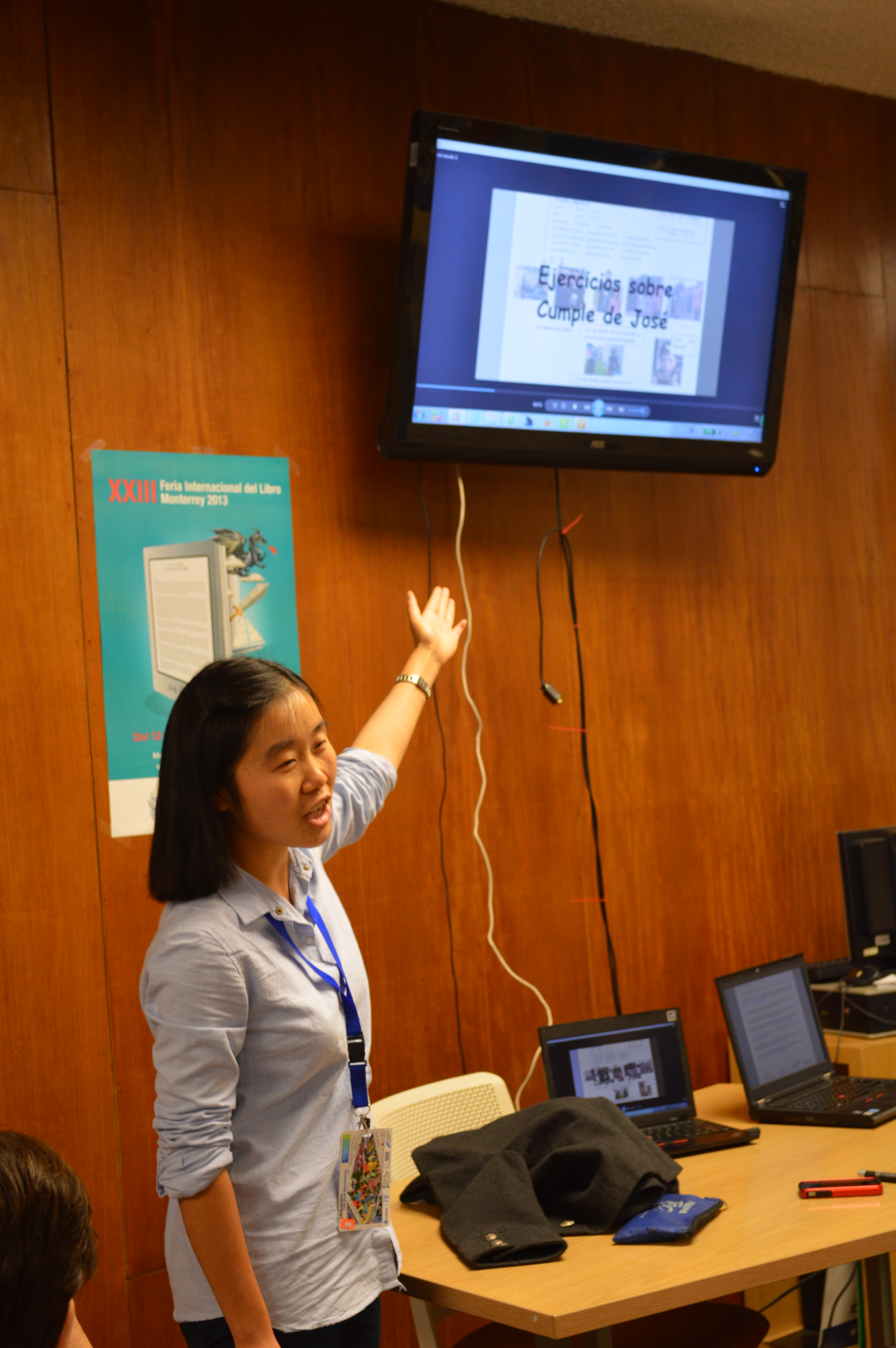
Chinese teacher Li Ying presenting on the use of the Internet in CFL studies at the 8º Congreso de Innovación y Tecnología Educativa at the Monterrey Institute of Technology and Higher Education, Monterrey

Chinese courses have been blooming internationally since 2000 at every level of education. Still, in most of the Western universities, the study of the Chinese language is only a part of Chinese Studies or sinology, instead of an independent discipline. The teaching of Chinese as a foreign language is known as duiwai hanyu jiaoxue (simplified Chinese: 对外汉语教学; traditional Chinese: 對外漢語教學; pinyin: Duìwài Hànyǔ Jiàoxué; lit. 'foreign Chinese language teaching'). The Confucius Institute, supervised by Hanban (the National Office For Teaching Chinese as a Foreign Language), promotes the Chinese language in the West and other parts of the world.

The People's Republic of China began to accept foreign students from the communist countries (in Eastern Europe, Asia and Africa) from the 1950s onwards. Foreign students were forced to leave the PRC during the Cultural Revolution. Taiwan has long been a place for students to study Mandarin. Popular choices for Westerners who want to study Chinese abroad include the Beijing Language and Culture University in Beijing, the Mandarin Training Center (MTC) and International Chinese Language Program (ICLP, formerly the Stanford Center) in Taiwan, and the Chinese University of Hong Kong.

Many online courses in Standard Mandarin, Standard Cantonese and some other varieties are available through commercial, governmental and nonprofit websites catering to speakers of English and over a hundred other languages. Free and Paid-for courses are also offered via podcasts. Software is also available to help students pronounce, read and translate Chinese into English and other languages.

Teaching the varieties of Chinese to non-native speakers is discouraged by the laws of the People's Republic of China.

In Malaysia, Singapore and Brunei, some Bumiputera and Indian send their children to Chinese primary school.

In recent years several independent language learners have used online resources and immersion techniques to learn Mandarin to various degrees of fluency, without relying on formal courses.

Among those who have documented their progress are Benny Lewis and Will Hart.

Both focused primarily on achieving oral proficiency by communicating with native speakers from an early stage in their learning.

== Notable non-native speakers of Chinese ==
- Viktor Axelsen: Danish national badminton player
- Ted Bundy: American serial killer
- Kenji Doihara: Japanese general and World War II war criminal
- Ai Fukuhara: Japanese national table-tennis player
- Ronald Graham: American mathematician
- Katharine Gun: British intelligence agent
- James Kynge: British, a regular commentator on Chinese and Asian issues.
- Thinaah Muralitharan: Malaysian of Indian descent badminton player
- John Rabe: German businessman, saved thousands of Chinese people from slaughter during the Nanking massacre.
- Sidney Rittenberg: American interpreter, Communist and businessman
- Richard Sorge: Soviet spy
- George Thomas Staunton: English traveller, Orientalist and translator
- Adam von Trott zu Solz: German diplomat and participant in the German resistance to Nazism
- James Veneris: American Korean War veteran; settled in Shandong province after the war
- Ruth Weiss: Austrian-born Chinese-naturalized journalist
- Bob Woodruff: American television journalist, ABC News
- Mark Zuckerberg: American businessman, founder of Facebook

=== Politicians, government servants and nobility ===
- W. Michael Blumenthal: United States Secretary of the Treasury
- Cecil Clementi: Governor of Hong Kong from 1925–30
- Cường Để: Vietnamese prince
- Elsie Elliott: British-born Hong Kong politician
- Timothy Geithner: United States Secretary of the Treasury
- Henrik, Prince Consort of Denmark: Danish prince consort
- Herbert Hoover: US president (limited use)
- Ho Chi Minh: Vietnamese revolutionary
- Jon Huntsman, Jr.: US Ambassador to China; former Governor of Utah.
- Banri Kaieda: Japanese politician and former leader of the DPJ
- Kim Il Sung: North Korean leader
- Karim Massimov: Kazakh Prime Minister
- Park Geun-hye: South Korean President
- Matthew Pottinger: US politician and Deputy National Security Advisor
- Kevin Rudd: former Prime Minister of Australia
- Princess Maha Chakri Sirindhorn: Thai crown princess
- Mulatu Teshome: Ethiopian President
- Kassym-Jomart Tokayev: Kazakh President
- Alice Weidel: German politician
- Barbara Woodward: English diplomat and permanent representative to the United Nations
- Maria Zakharova: Russian foreign ministry spokeswoman

=== Educators, historians, linguists and writers ===
- Frederick W. Baller: British missionary, linguist, translator, educator and sinologist
- Jack Belden: American journalist and war correspondent, author of China Shakes the World
- Pearl S. Buck: American novelist, author of The Good Earth, winner of the Nobel Prize in Literature
- John DeFrancis: American linguist
- Arif Dirlik: Turkish historian
- Wolfram Eberhard: German sociologist
- Peter Hessler: American writer and journalist
- Bernhard Karlgren: Swedish sinologist
- George Kennedy: American sinologist and developer of Yale romanization
- Joseph Needham: English sinologist
- Stephen Owen: American sinologist and literary analyst
- Phan Bội Châu: Vietnamese scholar and nationalist
- Vikram Seth: Indian academic
- Sidney Shapiro: American translator; acquired Chinese citizenship.
- Gary Snyder: American poet and essayist. Winner of the Pulitzer Prize for Poetry.
- Ezra Vogel: American academic
- Samuel Wells Williams: American missionary, linguist, and diplomat

=== Missionaries ===
- L. Nelson Bell: American Missionary father-in-law of Billy Graham
- John Birch: American missionary and namesake of the John Birch Society
- Walter Henry Medhurst: British missionary and translator
- Timothy Richard: American Baptist missionary
- Samuel Isaac Joseph Schereschewsky: Russian-born Bishop of Shanghai
- Hudson Taylor: British missionary and founder of the China Inland Mission

=== Actors, entertainers and cultural performers ===
- Shila Amzah: International multi-award winning Malaysian singer-songwriter
- Sola Aoi: Japanese model and actress
- Jessica Beinecke: American entertainer and host of online show OMG Meiyu
- Vanessa Branch: English American actress
- John Cena: American professional wrestler
- Dashan: Canadian stage performer famous in China
- Thomas Derksen: German-born online celebrity active in China
- Dean Fujioka: Japanese actor, musician, model
- Raz Gal-Or: Israeli businessman and online celebrity active in China
- Kim Go-eun: South Korean actress
- William Hootkins: American actor
- Oh Hyuk: South Korean singer, songwriter and main vocal of Band Hyukoh
- Jeon Hyun-moo: South Korean announcer and performer
- Im Jin-ah: South Korean singer and actress
- Dimash Kudaibergen: Kazakh singer and lyricist
- Ladybeard: Australian cross-dressing entertainer
- Jeff Locker: American television host active in Taiwan
- Michiko Nishiwaki: Japanese actress
- Arieh Smith: American Youtuber known for his ability to speak Mandarin Chinese among other languages
- Mira Sorvino: American actress
- Ryo Takeuchi: Japanese film director
- Abigail Washburn: American musician; singer, banjo player; performs in China and in the US
- Leehom Wang: American-born singer, ethnic Han, but didn't learn Chinese until 18

== See also ==
- Language teaching
- Chinese school
- Test of Chinese as a Foreign Language
