= 1992–93 NCAA Division I men's ice hockey season =

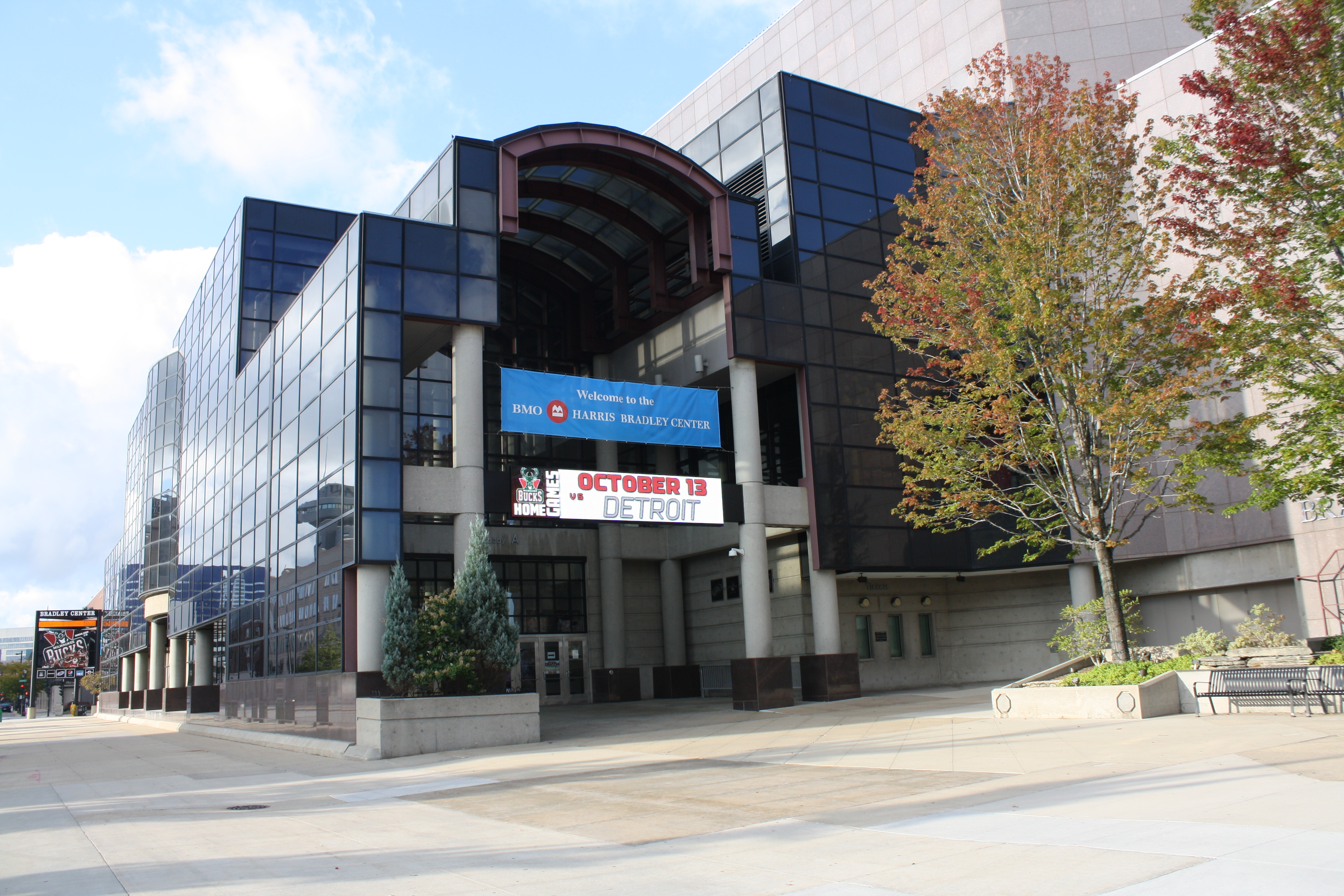
- The Bradley Center served as the host for the 1993 Frozen Four
- Duration: October 1992– April 3, 1993
- NCAA tournament: 1993
- National championship: Bradley Center; Milwaukee, Wisconsin
- NCAA champion: Maine
- Hobey Baker Award: Paul Kariya (Maine)

The 1992–93 NCAA Division I men's ice hockey season began in October 1992 and concluded with the 1993 NCAA Division I men's ice hockey tournament's championship game on April 3, 1993, at the Bradley Center in Milwaukee, Wisconsin. This was the 46th season in which an NCAA ice hockey championship was held and is the 99th year overall where an NCAA school fielded a team.

== Rule Changes ==
- If tournament advancement or the determination of a tournament champion is necessary, any series in a format (i.e.: total-goals series, single game) that results in a tie will be broken by 20-minute, sudden-death overtime periods instead of 10-minute, sudden-death overtime periods.

== Season Outlook ==
=== Pre-season polls ===
The top teams in the nation as ranked before the start of the season.

The WMPL poll was voted on by coaches. The Times Union poll was voted on by coaches, media, and NHL scouts.

This was the 4th and last season of the Times Union poll.

WMPL Poll
| Rank | Team |
|---|---|
| 1 | Michigan (8) |
| 2 | Maine (2) |
| 3 | Lake Superior State |
| 4 (tie) | Minnesota |
| 4 (tie) | Boston University |
| 6 | Clarkson |
| 7 | Michigan State |
| 8 | Wisconsin |
| 9 | Michigan Tech |
| 10 | Harvard |

Times Union Poll
| Rank | Team |
|---|---|
| 1 | Maine (9) |
| 2 | Michigan (7) |
| 3 | Minnesota (5) |
| 4 | Boston University (1) |
| 5 | Lake Superior State (2) |
| 6 | Clarkson (1) |
| 7 | Wisconsin |
| 8 | Michigan State |
| 9 | Harvard |
| 10 | Providence |

== Regular season ==
=== Season tournaments ===
| Tournament | Dates | Teams | Champion |
|---|---|---|---|
| Great Alaska Face–Off | November 26–28 | 4 | Maine |
| Duracell Hockey Challenge | November 27–28 | 4 | Lake Superior State |
| Holy Cross Tournament | November 28–29 | 4 | Holy Cross |
| Great Western Freeze–Out | December 19–20 | 4 | Maine |
| Great Lakes Invitational | December 26–27 | 4 | Michigan |
| Badger Showdown | December 28–29 | 4 | Boston University |
| Cleveland College Hockey Classic | December 29–30 | 4 | Maine |
| UNH Holiday Tournament | December 29–30 | 4 | Dartmouth |
| Denver Cup | December 29–30 | 4 | Denver |
| Rensselaer Holiday Tournament | December 29–30 | 4 | Providence |
| Dexter Shoe Classic | January 2–3 | 4 | Maine |
| Mariucci Classic | January 2–3 | 4 | Ferris State |
| Beanpot | February 1, 8 | 4 | Harvard |

=== Standings ===
1992–93 Central Collegiate Hockey Association standings
| | Conference | | | | | | | Overall | | | | | |
| | GP | W | L | T | PTS | GF | GA | GP | W | L | T | GF | GA |
|---|---|---|---|---|---|---|---|---|---|---|---|---|---|
| Miami† | 30 | 22 | 3 | 5 | 49 | 150 | 88 | 41 | 27 | 9 | 5 | 189 | 126 |
| Michigan | 30 | 23 | 5 | 2 | 48 | 180 | 71 | 40 | 30 | 7 | 3 | 238 | 95 |
| Lake Superior State* | 30 | 20 | 5 | 5 | 45 | 147 | 91 | 45 | 32 | 8 | 5 | 220 | 125 |
| Michigan State | 30 | 18 | 10 | 2 | 38 | 128 | 98 | 40 | 24 | 14 | 2 | 169 | 127 |
| Western Michigan | 30 | 17 | 11 | 2 | 36 | 118 | 117 | 38 | 20 | 16 | 2 | 147 | 150 |
| Ferris State | 30 | 13 | 13 | 4 | 30 | 103 | 118 | 41 | 21 | 16 | 4 | 162 | 141 |
| Bowling Green | 30 | 12 | 17 | 1 | 25 | 121 | 132 | 41 | 19 | 21 | 1 | 169 | 180 |
| Kent State | 30 | 10 | 19 | 1 | 21 | 118 | 148 | 38 | 13 | 22 | 3 | 150 | 181 |
| Illinois-Chicago | 30 | 8 | 20 | 2 | 18 | 100 | 134 | 37 | 10 | 25 | 2 | 122 | 170 |
| Notre Dame | 30 | 5 | 23 | 2 | 12 | 87 | 144 | 36 | 7 | 27 | 2 | 102 | 181 |
| Ohio State | 30 | 3 | 25 | 2 | 8 | 74 | 144 | 37 | 5 | 30 | 2 | 94 | 221 |
| Alaska-Fairbanks^ | | | | | | | | 37 | 23 | 12 | 2 | 204 | 127 |
Championship: Lake Superior State † indicates conference regular season champion * indicates conference tournament champion^ Alaska-Fairbanks is an affiliate member and its games do not count towards the conference standings

1992–93 ECAC Hockey standings
| | Conference | | | | | | | Overall | | | | | |
| | GP | W | L | T | PTS | GF | GA | GP | W | L | T | GF | GA |
|---|---|---|---|---|---|---|---|---|---|---|---|---|---|
| Harvard† | 22 | 16 | 3 | 3 | 35 | 95 | 61 | 31 | 22 | 6 | 3 | 137 | 85 |
| Rensselaer | 22 | 15 | 6 | 1 | 31 | 96 | 61 | 35 | 20 | 11 | 4 | 145 | 108 |
| Clarkson* | 22 | 12 | 6 | 4 | 28 | 103 | 64 | 35 | 20 | 10 | 5 | 157 | 95 |
| Brown | 22 | 13 | 7 | 2 | 28 | 102 | 78 | 31 | 16 | 12 | 3 | 134 | 123 |
| Yale | 22 | 12 | 7 | 3 | 27 | 97 | 86 | 31 | 15 | 12 | 4 | 132 | 122 |
| St. Lawrence | 22 | 12 | 8 | 2 | 26 | 89 | 77 | 32 | 17 | 12 | 3 | 133 | 114 |
| Vermont | 22 | 10 | 11 | 1 | 21 | 71 | 68 | 31 | 12 | 16 | 3 | 95 | 102 |
| Dartmouth | 22 | 9 | 13 | 0 | 18 | 82 | 96 | 27 | 11 | 16 | 0 | 98 | 121 |
| Colgate | 22 | 9 | 13 | 0 | 18 | 81 | 101 | 34 | 13 | 18 | 3 | 135 | 146 |
| Princeton | 22 | 6 | 13 | 3 | 15 | 70 | 98 | 29 | 9 | 17 | 3 | 90 | 124 |
| Cornell | 22 | 5 | 16 | 1 | 11 | 61 | 94 | 26 | 6 | 19 | 1 | 75 | 114 |
| Union | 22 | 3 | 19 | 0 | 6 | 44 | 107 | 25 | 3 | 22 | 0 | 53 | 120 |
Championship: Clarkson † indicates conference regular season champion * indicates conference tournament champion (Whitelaw Cup)

1992–93 Hockey East standings
| | Conference | | | | | | | Overall | | | | | |
| | GP | W | L | T | PTS | GF | GA | GP | W | L | T | GF | GA |
|---|---|---|---|---|---|---|---|---|---|---|---|---|---|
| Maine†* | 24 | 22 | 1 | 1 | 45 | 162 | 56 | 45 | 42 | 1 | 2 | 272 | 107 |
| Boston University | 24 | 18 | 5 | 1 | 37 | 126 | 84 | 40 | 29 | 9 | 2 | 193 | 126 |
| New Hampshire | 24 | 11 | 11 | 2 | 24 | 102 | 99 | 38 | 18 | 17 | 3 | 158 | 143 |
| Massachusetts–Lowell | 24 | 10 | 13 | 1 | 21 | 100 | 100 | 39 | 20 | 17 | 2 | 158 | 151 |
| Providence | 24 | 9 | 12 | 3 | 21 | 91 | 109 | 36 | 16 | 16 | 4 | 149 | 147 |
| Merrimack | 24 | 8 | 16 | 0 | 16 | 85 | 141 | 36 | 14 | 20 | 2 | 135 | 184 |
| Boston College | 24 | 6 | 15 | 3 | 15 | 80 | 120 | 38 | 9 | 24 | 5 | 117 | 187 |
| Northeastern | 24 | 6 | 17 | 1 | 13 | 89 | 127 | 35 | 10 | 24 | 1 | 137 | 193 |
Championship: Maine † indicates conference regular season champion * indicates conference tournament champion

1992–93 NCAA Division I Independent ice hockey standings
| | Conference | | | | | | | Overall | | | | | |
| | GP | W | L | T | PTS | GF | GA | GP | W | L | T | GF | GA |
|---|---|---|---|---|---|---|---|---|---|---|---|---|---|
| Air Force | 0 | 0 | 0 | 0 | - | - | - | 30 | 8 | 20 | 2 | 93 | 150 |
| Alaska-Anchorage | 0 | 0 | 0 | 0 | - | - | - | 36 | 18 | 13 | 5 | 129 | 126 |
| Army | 0 | 0 | 0 | 0 | - | - | - | 28 | 16 | 11 | 1 | 133 | 86 |

1992–93 Western Collegiate Hockey Association standings
| | Conference | | | | | | | Overall | | | | | |
| | GP | W | L | T | PTS | GF | GA | GP | W | L | T | GF | GA |
|---|---|---|---|---|---|---|---|---|---|---|---|---|---|
| Minnesota-Duluth† | 32 | 21 | 9 | 2 | 44 | 161 | 118 | 40 | 27 | 11 | 2 | 202 | 142 |
| Wisconsin | 32 | 18 | 11 | 3 | 39 | 138 | 107 | 42 | 24 | 15 | 3 | 192 | 146 |
| Minnesota* | 32 | 16 | 9 | 7 | 39 | 128 | 123 | 42 | 22 | 12 | 8 | 167 | 155 |
| Michigan Tech | 32 | 15 | 12 | 5 | 35 | 134 | 116 | 37 | 17 | 15 | 5 | 151 | 134 |
| Northern Michigan | 32 | 15 | 13 | 5 | 34 | 135 | 122 | 43 | 21 | 18 | 4 | 178 | 161 |
| Denver | 32 | 15 | 15 | 2 | 32 | 122 | 138 | 38 | 19 | 17 | 2 | 143 | 156 |
| St. Cloud State | 32 | 14 | 16 | 2 | 30 | 121 | 123 | 36 | 15 | 18 | 3 | 143 | 141 |
| North Dakota | 32 | 11 | 20 | 1 | 23 | 118 | 146 | 38 | 12 | 25 | 1 | 138 | 173 |
| Colorado College | 32 | 6 | 26 | 0 | 12 | 110 | 174 | 36 | 8 | 28 | 0 | 134 | 195 |
Championship: Minnesota † indicates conference regular season champion * indicates conference tournament champion

=== Final regular season polls ===
The WMPL and Times Union polls were released before the conference tournaments. The WMEB poll was released after the conference tournaments.

WMPL Coaches Poll
| Ranking | Team |
|---|---|
| 1 | Maine (10) |
| 2 | Michigan |
| 3 | Miami |
| 4 | Boston University |
| 5 | Harvard |
| (tie) | Miami |
| 7 | Lake Superior State |
| 8 | Wisconsin |
| 9 | Rensselaer |
| 10 | Minnesota |

WMEB Media Poll
| Ranking | Team |
|---|---|
| 1 | Maine (12) |
| 2 | Miami |
| 3 | Boston University |
| 4 | Michigan |
| 5 | Lake Superior State |
| 6 | Miami |
| 7 | Clarkson |
| 8 | Minnesota |
| 9 | Harvard |
| 10 | Wisconsin |

Times Union Poll
| Ranking | Team |
|---|---|
| 1 | Maine (24) |
| 2 | Michigan (1) |
| 3 | Miami |
| 4 | Boston University |
| 5 | Miami |
| 6 | Harvard |
| 7 | Lake Superior State |
| 8 | Rensselaer |
| 9 | Wisconsin |
| 10 | Minnesota |

== 1993 NCAA tournament ==
Regional Quarterfinals; March 26
E4 | Clarkson | 1
E5 | Minnesota | 2
W3 | Miami | 1
W6 | Wisconsin | 3
E3 | Harvard | 2
E6 | Northern Michigan | 3**
W4 | Minnesota–Duluth | 7
W5 | Brown | 3

Regional semifinals March 27
E1 | Maine | 6
E5 | Minnesota | 2
W2 | Michigan | 4*
W6 | Wisconsin | 3
E2 | Boston University | 4
E6 | Northern Michigan | 1
W1 | Lake Superior State | 4
W4 | Minnesota–Duluth | 3

Frozen Four; April 1
E1 | Maine | 4*
W2 | Michigan | 3
E2 | Boston University | 1
W1 | Lake Superior State | 6

National championship April 3
E1 | Maine | 5
W1 | Lake Superior State | 4

Note: * denotes overtime period(s)

== Player stats ==
=== Scoring leaders ===
The following players led the league in points at the conclusion of the season.

GP = Games played; G = Goals; A = Assists; Pts = Points; PIM = Penalty minutes

| Player | Class | Team | GP | G | A | Pts | PIM |
|---|---|---|---|---|---|---|---|
| Paul Kariya | Freshman | Maine | 39 | 25 | 75 | 100 | 12 |
| Jim Montgomery | Senior | Maine | 45 | 32 | 63 | 95 | 40 |
| Derek Plante | Senior | Minnesota–Duluth | 37 | 36 | 56 | 92 | 30 |
| Cal Ingraham | Junior | Maine | 45 | 46 | 39 | 85 | 50 |
| Chris Marinucci | Junior | Minnesota–Duluth | 40 | 35 | 42 | 77 | 52 |
| Brian Rolston | Sophomore | Lake Superior State | 41 | 35 | 36 | 71 | 20 |
| Bryan Smolinski | Senior | Michigan State | 40 | 31 | 37 | 68 | 91 |
| David Roberts | Senior | Michigan | 40 | 27 | 38 | 65 | 40 |
| Dean Fedorchuk | Junior | Alaska-Fairbanks | 36 | 28 | 36 | 64 | 48 |
| Greg Johnson | Senior | North Dakota | 38 | 19 | 45 | 64 | 18 |

=== Leading goaltenders ===
The following goaltenders led the league in goals against average at the end of the regular season while playing at least 33% of their team's total minutes.

GP = Games played; Min = Minutes played; W = Wins; L = Losses; OT = Overtime/shootout losses; GA = Goals against; SO = Shutouts; SV% = Save percentage; GAA = Goals against average

| Player | Class | Team | GP | Min | W | L | OT | GA | SO | SV% | GAA |
|---|---|---|---|---|---|---|---|---|---|---|---|
| Garth Snow | Senior | Maine | 23 | 1210 | 21 | 0 | 1 | 42 | 1 | .915 | 2.08 |
| Steve Shields | Junior | Michigan | 39 | 2027 | 30 | 6 | 2 | 87 | 2 | .909 | 2.22 |
| Chris Rogles | Senior | Clarkson | 27 | 1486 | 16 | 4 | 4 | 60 | 3 | .915 | 2.42 |
| Mike Dunham | Junior | Maine | 25 | 1429 | 21 | 1 | 1 | 63 | 0 | .893 | 2.65 |
| Blaine Lacher | Sophomore | Lake Superior State | 34 | 1915 | 24 | 5 | 3 | 86 | 0 | .892 | 2.69 |
| Richard Shulmistra | Junior | Miami | 33 | 1949 | 22 | 6 | 4 | 88 | 1 | .895 | 2.71 |
| Rod Adimey | Freshman | Army | 11 | 637 | 6 | 4 | 1 | 31 | 2 | .888 | 2.92 |
| Mike Buzak | Sophomore | Michigan State | 38 | 2090 | 22 | 10 | 2 | 102 | 0 | .896 | 2.93 |
| Neil Little | Junior | Rensselaer | 31 | 1801 | 19 | 9 | 3 | 88 | 1 | .906 | 2.93 |
| Jim Carey | Freshman | Wisconsin | 26 | 1525 | 15 | 8 | 1 | 78 | 1 | .899 | 3.07 |

== Awards ==
=== NCAA ===
| Award | | Recipient |
|---|---|---|
| Hobey Baker Memorial Award | | Paul Kariya, Maine |
| Spencer Penrose Award | | George Gwozdecky, Miami |
| Most Outstanding Player in NCAA Tournament | | Jim Montgomery, Maine |
AHCA All-American Teams
| East First Team | Position | West First Team |
| Mike Dunham, Maine | G | Jamie Ram, Michigan Tech |
| Chris Imes, Maine | D | Barry Richter, Wisconsin |
| Jack Duffy, Yale | D | Brett Hauer, Minnesota-Duluth |
| David Sacco, Boston University | F | Bryan Smolinski, Michigan State |
| Ted Drury, Harvard | F | Derek Plante, Minnesota-Duluth |
| Paul Kariya, Maine | F | Greg Johnson, North Dakota |
| East Second Team | Position | West Second Team |
| Neil Little, Rensselaer | G | Steve Shields, Michigan |
| Aaron Miller, Vermont | D | Bob Marshall, Miami |
| Kaj Linna, Boston University | D | Michael Smith, Lake Superior State |
| Cal Ingraham, Maine | F | Fred Knipscheer, St. Cloud State |
| Jim Montgomery, Maine | F | Brian Savage, Miami |
| Mark Kaufmann, Yale | F | Brian Rolston, Lake Superior State |

=== CCHA ===
| Awards | | Recipient |
|---|---|---|
| Player of the Year | | Brian Savage, Miami |
| Best Defensive Forward | | Chris Bergeron, Miami |
| Best Defensive Defenseman | | Bob Marshall, Miami |
| Best Offensive Defenseman | | Joe Cook, Miami |
| Rookie of the Year | | Chris Brooks, Western Michigan |
| Coach of the Year | | George Gwozdecky, Miami |
| Terry Flanagan Memorial Award | | Wes McCauley, Michigan State |
| Most Valuable Player in Tournament | | Blaine Lacher, Lake Superior State |
All-CCHA Teams
| First Team | Position | Second Team |
| Steve Shields, Michigan | G | Richard Shulmistra, Miami |
| Patrick Neaton, Michigan | D | Bob Marshall, Miami |
| Joe Cook, Miami | D | Michael Smith, Lake Superior State |
| Brian Rolston, Lake Superior State | F | Brian Holzinger, Bowling Green |
| Brian Savage, Miami | F | David Roberts, Michigan |
| Bryan Smolinski, Michigan State | F | David Oliver, Michigan |
| Rookie Team | Position | |
| Bob Petrie, Bowling Green | G | |
| Aaron Ellis, Bowling Green | D | |
| Scott Chartier, Western Michigan | D | |
| Justin Krall, Miami | D | |
| Chris Brooks, Western Michigan | F | |
| Jamie Ling, Notre Dame | F | |
| Sean Tallaire, Lake Superior State | F | |

=== ECAC ===
| Award | | Recipient |
|---|---|---|
| Player of the Year | | Ted Drury, Harvard |
| Rookie of the Year | | Burke Murphy, St. Lawrence |
| Coach of the Year | | Roger Demment, Dartmouth |
| Best Defensive Defenseman | | Martin d'Orsonnens, Clarkson |
| Best Defensive Forward | | Greg Carvel, St. Lawrence |
| Most Outstanding Player in Tournament | | Chris Rogles, Clarkson |
All-ECAC Hockey Teams
| First Team | Position | Second Team |
| Neil Little, Rensselaer | G | Christian Soucy, Vermont |
| Jack Duffy, Yale | D | Ted Beattie, St. Lawrence |
| Aaron Miller, Vermont | D | Brad Layzell, Rensselaer |
| Ted Drury, Harvard | F | Scott Fraser, Dartmouth |
| Mark Kaufmann, Yale | F | Scott Hanley, Brown |
| Marko Tuomainen, Clarkson | F | Todd Marchant, Clarkson |
| Rookie Team | Position | |
| Aaron Israel, Harvard | G | |
| Tripp Tracy, Harvard | G | |
| Dan Brierley, Yale | D | |
| Jeff Kungle, St. Lawrence | D | |
| Reid Simpson, Union | D | |
| Jason Smith, Princeton | D | |
| Matt Johnson, Vermont | F | |
| Bill Kelleher, Dartmouth | F | |
| Ryan Mulhern, Brown | F | |
| Burke Murphy, St. Lawrence | F | |
| Tim Regan, Rensselaer | F | |
| Bryan Richardson, Rensselaer | F | |

=== Hockey East ===
| Award | | Recipient |
|---|---|---|
| Player of the Year | | Paul Kariya, Maine |
| Rookie of the Year | | Paul Kariya, Maine |
| Bob Kullen Coach of the Year Award | | Shawn Walsh, Maine |
| Len Ceglarski Sportsmanship Award | | Shane Henry, Massachusetts-Lowell |
| William Flynn Tournament Most Valuable Player | | Jim Montgomery, Maine |
All-Hockey East Teams
| First Team | Position | Second Team |
| Mike Dunham, Maine | G | Garth Snow, Maine |
| Chris Imes, Maine | D | Kaj Linna, Boston University |
| Kevin O'Sullivan, Boston University | D | Chris Therien, Providence |
| Paul Kariya, Maine | F | Rob Donovan, New Hampshire |
| Jim Montgomery, Maine | F | Shane Henry, Massachusetts-Lowell |
| David Sacco, Boston University | F | Mike Murray, Massachusetts-Lowell |
| Rookie Team | Position | |
| Mike Veisor, Northeastern | G | |
| Dave MacIsaac, Maine | D | |
| Dan McGillis, Northeastern | D | |
| Chris Ferraro, Maine | F | |
| Mark Goble, Merrimack | F | |
| Paul Kariya, Maine | F | |

=== WCHA ===
| Award | | Recipient |
|---|---|---|
| Player of the Year | | Derek Plante, Minnesota-Duluth |
| Rookie of the Year | | Jim Carey, Wisconsin |
| Student-Athlete of the Year | | Brett Hauer, Minnesota-Duluth |
| Coach of the Year | | Mike Sertich, Minnesota-Duluth |
| Most Valuable Player in Tournament | | Travis Richards, Minnesota |
All-WCHA Teams
| First Team | Position | Second Team |
| Jamie Ram, Michigan Tech | G | Jim Carey, Wisconsin |
| Barry Richter, Wisconsin | D | Jon Rohloff, Minnesota-Duluth |
| Brett Hauer, Minnesota-Duluth | D | Travis Richards, Minnesota |
| Fred Knipscheer, St. Cloud State | F | Joe Frederick, Northern Michigan |
| Greg Johnson, North Dakota | F | John Young, Michigan Tech |
| Derek Plante, Minnesota-Duluth | F | Chris Marinucci, Minnesota-Duluth |
| Rookie Team | Position | |
| Jim Carey, Wisconsin | G | |
| Jason Wright, Michigan Tech | D | |
| Nick Naumenko, North Dakota | D | |
| Brian Bonin, Minnesota | F | |
| Jay McNeill, Colorado College | F | |
| Pat Mikesch, Michigan Tech | F | |

== 1993 NHL entry draft ==
| Round | Pick | Player | College | Conference | NHL team |
|---|---|---|---|---|---|
| 1 | 4 | Paul Kariya | Maine | Hockey East | Mighty Ducks of Anaheim |
| 1 | 19 | Landon Wilson ^{†} | North Dakota | WCHA | Toronto Maple Leafs |
| 1 | 25 | Kevyn Adams | Miami | CCHA | Boston Bruins |
| 2 | 32 | Jay Pandolfo | Boston University | Hockey East | New Jersey Devils |
| 2 | 39 | Brendan Morrison ^{†} | Michigan | CCHA | New Jersey Devils |
| 2 | 48 | Jon Coleman ^{†} | Boston University | Hockey East | Detroit Red Wings |
| 2 | 51 | Matt Alvey ^{†} | Lake Superior State | CCHA | Boston Bruins |
| 3 | 64 | Ethan Philpott ^{†} | Harvard | ECAC Hockey | Buffalo Sabres |
| 3 | 70 | Dan Tompkins ^{†} | Wisconsin | WCHA | Calgary Flames |
| 3 | 74 | Kevin Hilton | Michigan | CCHA | Detroit Red Wings |
| 3 | 75 | Bill Pierce ^{†} | Boston University | Hockey East | Quebec Nordiques |
| 4 | 84 | Trevor Roenick ^{†} | Maine | Hockey East | Hartford Whalers |
| 4 | 85 | Adam Wiesel ^{†} | Clarkson | ECAC Hockey | Montreal Canadiens |
| 4 | 89 | Jamal Mayers | Western Michigan | CCHA | St. Louis Blues |
| 4 | 92 | Warren Luhning ^{†} | Michigan | CCHA | New York Islanders |
| 4 | 95 | Jason Smith | Princeton | ECAC Hockey | Calgary Flames |
| 4 | 97 | John Jakopin ^{†} | Merrimack | Hockey East | Detroit Red Wings |
| 4 | 98 | Dieter Kochan ^{†} | Northern Michigan | WCHA | Vancouver Canucks |
| 4 | 99 | Jean-François Houle ^{†} | Clarkson | ECAC Hockey | Montreal Canadiens |
| 4 | 103 | Shawn Bates ^{†} | Boston University | Hockey East | Boston Bruins |
| 5 | 122 | John Emmons | Yale | ECAC Hockey | Calgary Flames |
| 5 | 130 | Chris Kelleher ^{†} | Boston University | Hockey East | Pittsburgh Penguins |
| 6 | 136 | Rick Mrozik ^{†} | Minnesota–Duluth | WCHA | Dallas Stars |
| 6 | 137 | Nick Checco ^{†} | Minnesota | WCHA | Quebec Nordiques |
| 6 | 140 | Mike Crowley ^{†} | Minnesota | WCHA | Philadelphia Flyers |
| 6 | 141 | Todd Kelman ^{†} | Bowling Green | CCHA | St. Louis Blues |
| 6 | 150 | Troy Creuer ^{†} | St. Lawrence | ECAC Hockey | Vancouver Canucks |
| 7 | 160 | Matt Peterson ^{†} | Wisconsin | WCHA | Mighty Ducks of Anaheim |
| 7 | 164 | Todd Marchant | Clarkson | ECAC Hockey | New York Rangers |
| 7 | 166 | Aaron Israel | Harvard | ECAC Hockey | Philadelphia Flyers |
| 7 | 167 | Mike Buzak | Michigan State | CCHA | St. Louis Blues |
| 7 | 172 | Justin Martin ^{†} | Vermont | ECAC Hockey | Los Angeles Kings |
| 7 | 173 | Dan Hendrickson ^{†} | Minnesota | WCHA | Washington Capitals |
| 7 | 177 | David Ruhly ^{†} | Providence | Hockey East | Montreal Canadiens |
| 7 | 180 | Tom White | Miami | CCHA | Chicago Blackhawks |
| 7 | 181 | Ryan Golden ^{†} | Massachusetts–Lowell | Hockey East | Boston Bruins |
| 8 | 186 | Tom Askey | Ohio State | CCHA | Mighty Ducks of Anaheim |
| 8 | 189 | Martin Bakula | Alaska–Anchorage | Independent | Edmonton Oilers |
| 8 | 190 | Ed Campbell ^{†} | Massachusetts–Lowell | Hockey East | New York Rangers |
| 8 | 191 | Rob Lurtsema ^{†} | Wisconsin | WCHA | Dallas Stars |
| 8 | 193 | Eric Boguniecki ^{†} | New Hampshire | Hockey East | St. Louis Blues |
| 8 | 195 | Thom Cullen ^{†} | St. Lawrence | ECAC Hockey | New Jersey Devils |
| 8 | 198 | Travis Dillabough ^{†} | Providence | Hockey East | Los Angeles Kings |
| 8 | 202 | Sean Tallaire | Lake Superior State | CCHA | Vancouver Canucks |
| 8 | 206 | Sergei Petrov ^{†} | Minnesota–Duluth | WCHA | Chicago Blackhawks |
| 8 | 207 | Hal Gill ^{†} | Providence | Hockey East | Boston Bruins |
| 9 | 209 | Toby Kvalevog ^{†} | North Dakota | WCHA | Ottawa Senators |
| 9 | 215 | Brad Norton ^{†} | Massachusetts | Independent | Edmonton Oilers |
| 9 | 218 | Tripp Tracy | Harvard | ECAC Hockey | Philadelphia Flyers |
| 9 | 219 | Mike Grier ^{†} | Boston University | Hockey East | St. Louis Blues |
| 9 | 221 | Judd Lambert ^{†} | Colorado College | WCHA | New Jersey Devils |
| 9 | 226 | E. J. Bradley ^{†} | Wisconsin | WCHA | Philadelphia Flyers |
| 9 | 231 | Vincent Auger ^{†} | Cornell | ECAC Hockey | Quebec Nordiques |
| 9 | 233 | Joel Prpic ^{†} | St. Lawrence | ECAC Hockey | Boston Bruins |
| 9 | 234 | Tim Harberts ^{†} | Notre Dame | CCHA | Pittsburgh Penguins |
| 10 | 235 | Rick Schuhwerk ^{†} | Northeastern | Hockey East | Ottawa Senators |
| 10 | 246 | Chris Davis ^{†} | Alaska–Anchorage | Independent | Buffalo Sabres |
| 10 | 253 | Kyle Ferguson | Michigan Tech | WCHA | Toronto Maple Leafs |
| 10 | 255 | Brian Larochelle ^{†} | New Hampshire | Hockey East | Montreal Canadiens |
| 10 | 256 | Jamie Kosecki ^{†} | Lake Superior State | CCHA | Detroit Red Wings |
| 10 | 257 | Mark Pivetz ^{†} | North Dakota | WCHA | Quebec Nordiques |
| 11 | 264 | David Penney ^{†} | Northeastern | Hockey East | Mighty Ducks of Anaheim |
| 11 | 270 | Ken Hemenway ^{†} | Boston College | Hockey East | Philadelphia Flyers |
| 11 | 273 | Mike Legg ^{†} | Michigan | CCHA | New Jersey Devils |
| 11 | 278 | Burke Murphy | St. Lawrence | ECAC Hockey | Calgary Flames |
| 11 | 279 | Mikhail Lapin | Western Michigan | CCHA | Toronto Maple Leafs |
| 11 | 281 | Russ Guzior ^{†} | Providence | Hockey East | Montreal Canadiens |
| 11 | 282 | Gordy Hunt ^{†} | Ferris State | CCHA | Detroit Red Wings |
| 11 | 283 | John Hillman ^{†} | Minnesota | WCHA | Quebec Nordiques |
| 11 | 284 | Tom Noble ^{†} | Boston University | Hockey East | Chicago Blackhawks |

† incoming freshman

== See also ==
- 1992–93 NCAA Division II men's ice hockey season
- 1992–93 NCAA Division III men's ice hockey season
