= Richard Shulmistra =

Canadian ice hockey player (born 1971)

- Born: April 1, 1971 (age 55) Sudbury, Ontario, Canada
- Height: 6 ft 2 in (188 cm)
- Weight: 185 lb (84 kg; 13 st 3 lb)
- Position: Goaltender
- Caught: Right
- Played for: New Jersey Devils; Florida Panthers; Eisbären Berlin; Adler Mannheim
- NHL draft: 1992 NHL Supplemental Draft; Quebec Nordiques
- Playing career: 1994–2004

Richard Shulmistra (born April 1, 1971) is a Canadian former professional ice hockey goaltender. He played two games in the National Hockey League with the New Jersey Devils and Florida Panthers between 1998 and 2000, while the rest of his career, which lasted from 1994 to 2004, was spent mainly in the minor leagues. Prior to turning professional Shulmistra played US college hockey at Miami University.

== Collegiate career ==
Shulmistra played junior hockey for the Thunder Bay Flyers of the United States Hockey League for their 1989–90 season before signing to play for the Miami RedHawks of the Central Collegiate Hockey Association. He was drafted by the Quebec Nordiques in the 1992 NHL Supplemental Draft. Miami capped a historic year for the program in 1993 when the team received its first bid to the NCAA Men's Ice Hockey Tournament. Miami was led by Brian Savage (2nd-Team All-American, 37 goals), defenseman Bobby Marshall (2nd-Team All American, 45 points) and Shulmistra with a 2.71 GAA. The team lost in the first round to Wisconsin 3–1 at the Joe Louis Arena in Detroit, Michigan. Shulmistra turned pro after the 1993-94 Miami campaign in which he was named the Miami team MVP.

== Professional career ==
Shulmistra spent most of his professional career in the US minor leagues, starting with the Cornwall Aces, the American Hockey League affiliate of Quebec. He played one game for the New Jersey Devils on January 1, 1998, saving 28 shots in a 2–1 loss to the Florida Panthers. He next saw the NHL on December 27, 1999, saving 20 shots for Florida in a 6–1 victory over the Tampa Bay Lightning. Shulmistra then went to Germany in 2001, playing for the Berlin Polar Bears and the Mannheim Eagles in the Deutsche Eishockey Liga in his three seasons abroad. He retired after the 2003–04 season.

== Personal life ==
Shulmistra now lives in North Carolina and works as a goalie coach. He coached the bantam AAA Carolina Jr Hurricanes team for one season. He produced the video series "Winning Hockey Goaltending featuring Coach Richard Shulmistra."

== Career statistics ==
=== Regular season and playoffs ===
			Regular season									Playoffs
Season	Team	League	GP	W	L	T	MIN	GA	SO	GAA	SV%	GP	W	L	MIN	GA	SO	GAA	SV%
1988–89	St. Michael's Buzzers	MetJBHL	12	10	2	0	715	29	1	2.43	—	—	—	—	—	—	—	—	—
1989–90	Thunder Bay Flyers	TBJHL	37	—	—	—	2090	131	0	3.76	—	—	—	—	—	—	—	—	—
1990–91	Miami University	CCHA	20	2	12	2	920	80	0	5.21	—	—	—	—	—	—	—	—	—
1991–92	Miami University	CCHA	19	3	5	2	850	67	0	4.72	—	—	—	—	—	—	—	—	—
1992–93	Miami University	CCHA	33	22	6	4	1949	88	1	2.71	—	—	—	—	—	—	—	—	—
1993–94	Miami University	CCHA	27	13	12	1	1521	74	0	2.92	—	—	—	—	—	—	—	—	—
1994–95	Cornwall Aces	AHL	20	4	9	2	937	58	0	3.71	.868	8	4	3	446	22	0	2.95	.910
1995–96	Cornwall Aces	AHL	36	9	18	2	1844	100	0	3.25	.882	1	0	0	9	1	0	6.76	.889
1996–97	Albany River Rats	AHL	23	5	9	2	1062	43	2	2.43	.916	2	1	0	77	2	0	1.56	.938
1997–98	New Jersey Devils	NHL	1	0	1	0	62	2	0	1.94	.933	—	—	—	—	—	—	—	—
1997–98	Fort Wayne Komets	IHL	11	3	8	0	656	34	1	3.11	.897	—	—	—	—	—	—	—	—
1997–98	Albany River Rats	AHL	34	20	8	4	2022	78	2	2.31	.918	13	8	3	696	32	1	2.76	.910
1998–99	Manitoba Moose	IHL	44	25	11	7	2469	117	2	2.84	.908	—	—	—	—	—	—	—	—
1998–99	Albany River Rats	AHL	12	6	4	0	596	34	0	3.42	.884	2	0	2	64	3	0	2.82	.857
1999–00	Florida Panthers	NHL	1	1	0	0	60	1	0	1.00	.952	—	—	—	—	—	—	—	—
1999–00	Louisville Panthers	AHL	27	12	11	2	1447	80	2	3.32	.903	—	—	—	—	—	—	—	—
1999–00	Orlando Solar Bears	IHL	9	5	1	3	520	16	1	1.85	.918	1	0	1	30	3	0	5.90	.727
2000–01	Louisville Panthers	AHL	1	0	1	0	60	4	0	4.00	.886	—	—	—	—	—	—	—	—
2000–01	Kansas City Blades	IHL	4	1	3	0	239	13	0	3.26	.891	—	—	—	—	—	—	—	—
2000–01	Florida Everblades	ECHL	2	2	0	0	130	7	0	3.23	.901	—	—	—	—	—	—	—	—
2000–01	Chicago Wolves	IHL	29	20	8	0	1616	51	4	1.89	.937	10	7	3	591	20	2	2.03	.924
2001–02	Eisbären Berlin	DEL	52	—	—	—	3029	120	6	2.38	.918	4	—	—	268	10	0	2.24	.932
2002–03	Eisbären Berlin	DEL	29	—	—	—	1132	35	3	1.86	.937	9	—	—	533	20	1	2.25	.917
2003–04	Adler Mannheim	DEL	28	—	—	—	1445	53	0	2.20	.914	1	—	—	58	4	0	4.14	.857
NHL totals			2	1	1	0	122	3	0	1.48	.941	—	—	—	—	—	—	—	—

== Awards and honours ==
Award	Year
College
CCHA Second All-Star Team	1993
AHL
Second All-Star Team	1998
