= Fred Knipscheer =

American ice hockey player (born 1969)

- Born: September 3, 1969 (age 56) Fort Wayne, Indiana, U.S.
- Height: 5 ft 11 in (180 cm)
- Weight: 190 lb (86 kg; 13 st 8 lb)
- Position: Center
- Shot: Left
- Played for: Boston Bruins; St. Louis Blues
- NHL draft: Undrafted
- Playing career: 1993–2000

Fred Knipscheer (born September 3, 1969) is an American former professional ice hockey player who played 28 games in the National Hockey League with the Boston Bruins and St. Louis Blues between 1993 and 1996. The rest of his career, which lasted from 1993 to 2000, was spent in the minor leagues.

== Early life ==
A native of Fort Wayne, Indiana grew up playing junior hockey at R. Nelson Snider High School. He attended St. Cloud State University and played for the St. Cloud State Huskies for three seasons. During the 1992–1993 season, he scored 34 goals in 36 games and was voted on to the WCHA first all-star team and the NCAA West Second All-American Team.

== Career ==
Knipscheer was signed by the Boston Bruins as a free agent and played eleven games for the team during the 1993–1994 season. Knipscheer scored three goals but spent most of the year with the Providence Bruins of the American Hockey League. He scored 63 points in Providence and played a 16-game recall in Boston.

Early in the 1995–1996 season, Knipscheer was traded to the St. Louis Blues for veteran defenseman Rick Zombo. He only played one NHL game that year and returned to the minors, where he remained through the 1999–2000 season.

After retiring from hockey, Knipscheer started a hospitality holding group and became the managing partner of two restaurants in Indianapolis. He also coaches youth hockey and founded a company that produces CBD products.

== Career statistics ==
=== Regular season and playoffs ===
| | | | Regular season | | | | | Playoffs |
| Season | Team | League | GP | G | A | Pts | PIM | GP | G | A | Pts | PIM |
|---|---|---|---|---|---|---|---|---|---|---|---|---|
| 1988–89 | Omaha Lancers | USHL | 47 | 32 | 33 | 65 | 123 | — | — | — | — | — |
| 1989–90 | Omaha Lancers | USHL | 48 | 38 | 46 | 84 | 66 | — | — | — | — | — |
| 1990–91 | St. Cloud State University | WCHA | 40 | 9 | 10 | 19 | 57 | — | — | — | — | — |
| 1991–92 | St. Cloud State University | WCHA | 33 | 15 | 17 | 32 | 48 | — | — | — | — | — |
| 1992–93 | St. Cloud State University | WCHA | 36 | 34 | 26 | 60 | 68 | — | — | — | — | — |
| 1993–94 | Boston Bruins | NHL | 11 | 3 | 2 | 5 | 14 | 12 | 2 | 1 | 3 | 6 |
| 1993–94 | Providence Bruins | AHL | 62 | 26 | 13 | 39 | 50 | — | — | — | — | — |
| 1994–95 | Boston Bruins | NHL | 16 | 3 | 1 | 4 | 2 | 4 | 0 | 0 | 0 | 0 |
| 1994–95 | Providence Bruins | AHL | 71 | 29 | 34 | 63 | 81 | — | — | — | — | — |
| 1995–96 | St. Louis Blues | NHL | 1 | 0 | 0 | 0 | 2 | — | — | — | — | — |
| 1995–96 | Worcester IceCats | AHL | 68 | 36 | 37 | 73 | 93 | 3 | 0 | 0 | 0 | 2 |
| 1996–97 | Phoenix Roadrunners | IHL | 24 | 5 | 11 | 16 | 19 | — | — | — | — | — |
| 1996–97 | Indianapolis Ice | IHL | 41 | 10 | 9 | 19 | 46 | 4 | 0 | 2 | 2 | 10 |
| 1997–98 | Kentucky Thoroughblades | AHL | 17 | 0 | 7 | 7 | 8 | 3 | 0 | 1 | 1 | 7 |
| 1997–98 | Utah Grizzlies | IHL | 58 | 21 | 32 | 53 | 69 | 2 | 0 | 0 | 0 | 4 |
| 1998–99 | Utah Grizzlies | IHL | 21 | 4 | 9 | 13 | 20 | — | — | — | — | — |
| 1998–99 | Cincinnati Cyclones | IHL | 43 | 14 | 15 | 29 | 44 | 3 | 2 | 1 | 3 | 4 |
| 1999–00 | Cincinnati Cyclones | IHL | 8 | 1 | 0 | 1 | 2 | — | — | — | — | — |
| 1999–00 | Milwaukee Admirals | AHL | 40 | 8 | 23 | 31 | 26 | 3 | 2 | 2 | 4 | 0 |
| AHL totals | | | 218 | 91 | 91 | 182 | 232 | 6 | 0 | 1 | 1 | 9 |
| IHL totals | | | 235 | 63 | 99 | 162 | 226 | 12 | 4 | 5 | 9 | 18 |
| NHL totals | | | 28 | 6 | 3 | 9 | 18 | 16 | 2 | 1 | 3 | 6 |

== Awards and honors ==
| Award | Year |
|---|---|
| All-WCHA First Team | 1992–93 |
| AHCA West Second-Team All-American | 1992–93 |
