= Jack Duffy (ice hockey) =

American ice hockey player

- Born: September 25, 1970 (age 55) Northford, Connecticut, U.S.
- Height: 6 ft 1 in (185 cm)
- Weight: 194 lb (88 kg; 13 st 12 lb)
- Position: Defense
- Shot: Right
- Played for: Yale; Knoxville Cherokees; Las Vegas Thunder; Chicago Wolves
- NHL draft: 1991 NHL Supplemental Draft; New York Islanders
- Playing career: 1989–1996

Jack Duffy (born September 25, 1970) is an American ice hockey coach and former defenseman who was an All-American for Yale. He is the former head coach of the Greenwich Cardinals boys ice hockey team.

== Career ==
Duffy began attending Yale University in the fall of 1989, joining a program that had slowly improving over the course of the 1980s. Duffy was not a big scorer for the Bulldogs, but he was instrumental in getting Yale's defense to allow fewer goals in each of his four seasons. He was able to help Yale to a winning record as a junior while producing at a point per game pace. He was named team captain for his senior season and, while the results were still positive, the team stalled a bit and wasn't able to build on their modest success. Duffy was named an All-American and began his professional career the following year.

Duffy split time between leagues in 1994 but was impressive enough to find himself in the IHL for the entirety of 1994–95. He played one more year at that level before deciding to retire as a player. He immediately turned to coaching, returning to Connecticut to work with the Greenwich Skating Club, but took several years off after starting a family. When his daughter Hayley began playing hockey, he returned to coaching. Duffy was the assistant coach of the boys hockey team at Greenwich High School for two seasons. In July 2020, head coach Chris Rurak died suddenly at the age of 47. A few months later, Duffy agreed to take over as head coach of the Greenwich Cardinals boys ice hockey team, a position he held for several seasons before stepping down in 2025.

== Statistics ==
=== Regular season and playoffs ===
			Regular Season					Playoffs
Season	Team	League	GP	G	A	Pts	PIM	GP	G	A	Pts	PIM
1986–87	North Branford High School	CT–HS	—	—	—	—	—	—	—	—	—	—
1987–88	North Branford High School	CT–HS	—	—	—	—	—	—	—	—	—	—
1988–89	Choate Rosemary Hall	US–Prep	—	—	—	—	—	—	—	—	—	—
1989–90	Yale	ECAC Hockey	26	1	6	7	48	—	—	—	—	—
1990–91	Yale	ECAC Hockey	29	4	8	12	48	—	—	—	—	—
1991–92	Yale	ECAC Hockey	27	3	24	27	74	—	—	—	—	—
1992–93	Yale	ECAC Hockey	31	8	17	25	60	—	—	—	—	—
1993–94	Las Vegas Thunder	IHL	19	1	7	8	18	—	—	—	—	—
1993–94	Knoxville Cherokees	ECHL	33	6	15	21	73	3	1	0	1	10
1994–95	Chicago Wolves	IHL	69	3	11	14	98	3	0	3	3	4
1995–96	Chicago Wolves	IHL	58	1	11	12	83	6	0	1	1	4
NCAA totals			113	16	55	71	230	—	—	—	—	—
IHL totals			146	5	29	34	199	9	0	4	4	8

== Awards and honors ==
Award	Year
All-ECAC Hockey Second Team	1991–92
All-ECAC Hockey First Team	1992–93
AHCA East First-Team All-American	1992–93
