= Ted Drury =

American ice hockey player (born 1971)

- Born: September 13, 1971 (age 54) Boston, Massachusetts, U.S.
- Height: 6 ft 0 in (183 cm)
- Weight: 190 lb (86 kg; 13 st 8 lb)
- Position: Center
- Shot: Left
- Played for: Calgary Flames; Hartford Whalers; Ottawa Senators; Anaheim Mighty Ducks; New York Islanders; Columbus Blue Jackets; Hamburg Freezers; Kassel Huskies; Krefeld Pinguine
- National team: United States
- NHL draft: 42nd overall, 1989; Calgary Flames
- Playing career: 1993–2007

Theodore Evans Drury (born September 13, 1971) is an American former professional ice hockey player who played 414 games in the National Hockey League (NHL) for the Calgary Flames, Hartford Whalers, Ottawa Senators, Mighty Ducks of Anaheim, New York Islanders and Columbus Blue Jackets. He is the older brother of former NHL player Chris Drury. He was born in Boston, Massachusetts, but grew up in Trumbull, Connecticut.

== Playing career ==
=== NCAA ===
Drury played his college hockey at Harvard University, and was drafted 42nd overall by the Calgary Flames in the 1989 NHL entry draft. Drury was named Ivy League Rookie of the Year and earned ECAC All-Rookie accolades his freshman year (1989–90) at Harvard. Serving as team captain in 1992–93, Drury led the Crimson men's ice hockey team to the ECAC regular season title and a berth in the NCAA Men's Ice Hockey Championship. In 1992–93, he was named the most valuable player of the Beanpot tournament after scoring the game-winning goal and leading the Crimson to the Beanpot title. That same year, he was selected as a first team All-Ivy, first team All-ECAC and first team All-American. In 1992–93, he was also selected Ivy League Player of the Year, ECAC Player of the Year and was a finalist for the Hobey Baker Award. He was later named to the ECAC All-Decade Team for the 1990s.

=== Professional ===
In his NHL career, Drury played for the Calgary Flames, Hartford Whalers, Ottawa Senators, Mighty Ducks of Anaheim, New York Islanders and Columbus Blue Jackets.

From 2002 to 2007, Drury played in the Deutsche Eishockey Liga (DEL) for the Hamburg Freezers, Kassel Huskies and the Krefeld Pinguine.

Drury retired from professional hockey in April 2007. He was inducted into the Fairfield County Sports Hall of Fame in 2015.

== International career ==
Drury represented the United States at the 1992 and 1994 Winter Olympics. Drury also competed for Team USA on numerous other occasions, playing in the 1990 and 1991 World Junior Championships. Drury also competed for Team USA at the 2003 IIHF Men's Worlds.

== Personal life ==
Drury is married to former All-American lacrosse player Liz Berkery Drury. They have five children and reside in Winnetka, Illinois. His son, Jack, was drafted 42nd overall by the Carolina Hurricanes in the 2018 NHL entry draft. Drury's younger brother is former Buffalo Sabres and New York Rangers captain, Chris Drury.

== Career statistics ==
=== Regular season and playoffs ===
			Regular season					Playoffs
Season	Team	League	GP	G	A	Pts	PIM	GP	G	A	Pts	PIM
1987–88	Fairfield Prep	HS-CT	24	21	28	49	—	—	—	—	—	—
1988–89	Fairfield Prep	HS-CT	25	35	31	66	—	—	—	—	—	—
1989–90	Harvard University	ECAC	17	9	13	22	10	—	—	—	—	—
1990–91	Harvard University	ECAC	26	18	18	36	22	—	—	—	—	—
1991–92	United States National Team	Intl	53	11	23	34	30	—	—	—	—	—
1992–93	Harvard University	ECAC	31	22	41	63	26	—	—	—	—	—
1993–94	United States National Team	Intl	11	1	4	5	11	—	—	—	—	—
1993–94	Calgary Flames	NHL	34	5	7	12	26	—	—	—	—	—
1993–94	Hartford Whalers	NHL	16	1	5	6	10	—	—	—	—	—
1994–95	Springfield Falcons	AHL	2	0	1	1	0	—	—	—	—	—
1994–95	Hartford Whalers	NHL	34	3	6	9	21	—	—	—	—	—
1995–96	Ottawa Senators	NHL	42	9	7	16	54	—	—	—	—	—
1996–97	Mighty Ducks of Anaheim	NHL	73	9	9	18	54	10	1	0	1	4
1997–98	Mighty Ducks of Anaheim	NHL	73	6	10	16	82	—	—	—	—	—
1998–99	Mighty Ducks of Anaheim	NHL	75	5	6	11	83	4	0	0	0	0
1999–00	Mighty Ducks of Anaheim	NHL	11	1	1	2	6	—	—	—	—	—
1999–00	New York Islanders	NHL	55	2	1	3	31	—	—	—	—	—
2000–01	Chicago Wolves	IHL	68	21	21	42	53	14	5	4	9	4
2000–01	Columbus Blue Jackets	NHL	1	0	0	0	0	—	—	—	—	—
2001–02	Albany River Rats	AHL	51	8	10	18	23	—	—	—	—	—
2001–02	Lowell Lock Monsters	AHL	16	6	5	11	10	5	0	5	5	6
2002–03	Hamburg Freezers	DEL	52	16	22	38	52	5	0	2	2	6
2003–04	Kassel Huskies	DEL	52	14	16	30	102	—	—	—	—	—
2004–05	Kassel Huskies	DEL	51	12	15	27	67	—	—	—	—	—
2005–06	Krefeld Pinguine	DEL	48	21	26	47	66	5	2	1	3	6
2006–07	Krefeld Pinguine	DEL	49	9	20	29	97	2	1	1	2	0
NHL totals			414	41	52	93	367	14	1	0	1	4
DEL totals			252	70	98	168	384	12	3	4	7	12

=== International ===
Year	Team	Event	GP	G	A	Pts	PIM
1990	United States	WJC	7	2	1	3	2
1991	United States	WJC	7	5	7	12	2
1992	United States	OG	7	1	1	2	0
1994	United States	OG	8	1	2	3	2
1998	United States	WC	6	0	1	1	4
2003	United States	WC	6	2	2	4	2
Junior totals			14	7	8	15	4
Senior totals			27	4	6	10	8

== Awards and honors ==
Award	Year
All-ECAC Hockey Rookie Team	1989–90
All-ECAC Hockey First Team	1992–93
AHCA East First-Team All-American	1992–93

Awards and achievements
Preceded by Daniel Laperrière	ECAC Hockey Player of the Year; 1992–93	Succeeded by Steve Martins
