= Mark Kaufmann =

Canadian ice hockey player (born 1971)

- Born: July 7, 1971 (age 55) Tokyo, Japan
- Height: 5 ft 10 in (178 cm)
- Weight: 175 lb (79 kg; 12 st 7 lb)
- Position: Center
- Shot: Left
- Played for: Yale; Asiago Hockey 1935; Portland Pirates; EC KAC; Grasshopper Club Zürich; SC Rapperswil-Jona Lakers; Nikkō Ice Bucks
- National team: Canada
- Playing career: 1989–2003

Mark Kaufmann is a Canadian retired ice hockey center who was an All-American for Yale.

== Career ==
Kaufmann was born in Japan and was there until age 6 when his family moved back to British Columbia. After working his way through the junior programs, Kaufmann began attending Yale University in the fall of 1989. In his first two seasons with the team, Kaufmann played well but the Bulldogs weren't very good, finishing both years with losing records. Yale and Kaufmann began to see a change in 1991 when his point production nearly doubled and the team posted its first winning season in 5 years. The Bulldogs held firm in Kaufmann's final season but he increased his scoring to more than two points per game and was named an All-American. Kaufmann also set a program record for the most points in a season that stands as of 2021.

After graduating, Kaufmann began his professional career with Asiago but then joined Team Canada for parts of three years. At the tail end of the 1996 season, he signed on with the Portland Pirates and helped the team reach the Calder Cup finals that year. Despite producing in postseason, Kaufmann returned to Europe after the season and played for three teams over the course of the next three years.

In 1999 the Nikkō Ice Bucks were reestablished after a financial crisis and Kaufmann got a chance to return to his first home. He played parts of four years with the club, leading the Bucks in scoring three times, and retired in 2003.

While he had been pursuing his hockey career, Kaufmann had been working part-time as a software designer. As his playing career was coming to a close, he transitioned into linguistic training and worked with the Linguistic Institute until co-founding his own company along with his father Steve Kaufmann, LingQ in 2007. He continued to work as the CEO of LingQ while also serving as President of KP Logix, a software company located in the Vancouver area.

== Statistics ==
=== Regular season and playoffs ===
			Regular Season					Playoffs
Season	Team	League	GP	G	A	Pts	PIM	GP	G	A	Pts	PIM
1988–89	Richmond Sockeyes	BCHL	60	42	46	88	34	—	—	—	—	—
1989–90	Yale	ECAC Hockey	29	9	16	25	36	—	—	—	—	—
1990–91	Yale	ECAC Hockey	28	10	17	27	12	—	—	—	—	—
1991–92	Yale	ECAC Hockey	27	25	20	45	18	—	—	—	—	—
1992–93	Yale	ECAC Hockey	31	25	38	63	10	—	—	—	—	—
1992–93	Canada	International	7	5	3	8	0	—	—	—	—	—
1993–94	HC Asiago	Serie A	20	13	18	31	—	—	—	—	—	—
1993–94	Canada	International	6	1	2	3	19	—	—	—	—	—
1994–95	Canada	International	53	30	38	68	14	—	—	—	—	—
1995–96	Canada	International	53	16	33	49	22	—	—	—	—	—
1995–96	Portland Pirates	AHL	3	2	1	3	0	24	4	15	19	6
1996–97	EC KAC	Austria	55	28	34	62	44	—	—	—	—	—
1997–98	Grasshopper Club Zürich	NLB	38	31	46	77	24	5	2	2	4	2
1998–99	Grasshopper Club Zürich	NLB	40	26	29	55	36	3	1	1	2	4
1998–99	SC Rapperswil-Jona Lakers	NLA	—	—	—	—	—	3	0	0	0	0
1999–00	Nikkō Ice Bucks	JIHL	15	7	7	14	10	—	—	—	—	—
1999–00	Canada	International	2	0	2	2	0	—	—	—	—	—
2000–01	Nikkō Ice Bucks	JIHL	40	25	30	55	—	—	—	—	—	—
2001–02	Nikkō Ice Bucks	JIHL	38	28	36	64	—	—	—	—	—	—
2002–03	Nikkō Ice Bucks	JIHL	22	15	17	32	—	—	—	—	—	—
NCAA totals			115	69	91	160	76	—	—	—	—	—
International totals			121	52	78	130	55	—	—	—	—	—
NLB totals			78	57	75	132	60	8	3	3	6	6
JIHL totals			115	75	90	165	—	—	—	—	—	—

== Awards and honors ==
Award	Year
ECAC Hockey All-Rookie Team	1989–90
All-ECAC Hockey First Team	1991–92
All-ECAC Hockey First Team	1992–93
AHCA East Second-Team All-American	1992–93
