= Jim Carey (ice hockey) =

American ice hockey player (born 1974)

- Born: May 31, 1974 (age 51) Dorchester, Massachusetts, U.S.
- Height: 6 ft 2 in (188 cm)
- Weight: 190 lb (86 kg; 13 st 8 lb)
- Position: Goaltender
- Caught: Left
- Played for: Washington Capitals; Boston Bruins; St. Louis Blues
- NHL draft: 32nd overall, 1992; Washington Capitals
- Playing career: 1994–1999

James Michael Carey (born May 31, 1974) is an American former professional ice hockey goaltender who played for the Washington Capitals, Boston Bruins, and St. Louis Blues in the National Hockey League (NHL). He won the Vezina Trophy for the NHL's best goaltender in 1996.

== Playing career ==
Carey made his college hockey debut with the Wisconsin Badgers in 1992. He was the highest drafted goalie in the 1992 NHL entry draft, taken in the second round, 32nd overall by the Washington Capitals. Before coming to Washington, Carey played in the IIHF World U20 Championship in 1993 and played in the AHL with the Portland Pirates. In Portland, he took home numerous individual awards, including the Dudley "Red" Garrett Memorial Award as the top rookie in the AHL and the Aldege "Baz" Bastien Memorial Award for top netminder in the AHL. He was also selected to the First All-Star Team.

In 1994–95, Carey made his NHL debut in Washington and went undefeated in his first seven games. He would finish the season with an 18–6–3 record and was selected to the NHL All-Rookie team. This early success promoted him to Washington's starting goalie the following season – his best in the NHL. He played in 71 games, won 35, recorded nine shutouts, and finished with a GAA of 2.26. Carey won the Vezina Trophy for his efforts and was selected to the NHL first All-Star team.

The next fall, Carey was the backup to goalie Mike Richter on Team USA in the World Cup of Hockey. The United States would win the championship by beating Team Canada in three games.

In 1996–97 NHL season, Carey was traded midway through the season to the Boston Bruins in a blockbuster deal. Carey would never find his true form again in Boston and was sent down to the minors a year later with the Providence Bruins in the AHL. He signed on as a free agent at the end of the season with the St. Louis Blues and played four games before retiring at the end of the 1998–99 NHL season.

=== Other ===
Due to the similarity of his given and surname to that of actor Jim Carrey, his nicknames were "The Mask", "Ace", and eventually "Net Detective", which were a play on Carrey's 1994 films, The Mask and Ace Ventura: Pet Detective.

== Post-NHL career ==
Carey is the president and CEO of OptiMED Billing Solutions, Inc., a medical billing company based out of Boston and Sarasota, Florida.

== Awards and honors ==
Medal record

Men's ice hockey

Representing the United States

World Cup
Gold medal – first place	1996 World Cup of Hockey	

Award	Year
All-WCHA Rookie Team	1992–93
All-WCHA Second Team	1992–93

- Named WCHA Rookie of the Year in 1993.
- Selected to the AHL First All-Star Team in 1995.
- Dudley "Red" Garrett Memorial Award winner in 1995.
- Aldege "Baz" Bastien Memorial Award winner in 1995.
- Selected as Rookie of the Year by Hockey Star Presents in 1995.
- Rated #19 in "The Top 50 Netminders in Pro Hockey" by Hockey Star Presents in 1995.
- Selected to the NHL All-Rookie team in 1995.
- Selected to the NHL first All-Star team in 1996.
- Vezina Trophy winner in 1996.
- Inducted into the Portland Pirates Hall of Fame in 2008.

== Washington Capitals records ==
- Career lowest GAA (2.37)
- Lowest GAA in a single season (2.13 in 1995) – surpassed by Braden Holtby – 2.07
- Tied for most penalty minutes in a playoff season (4 in 1995)
- Tied for most shutouts in a single season (9 in 1996)

== Career statistics ==
=== Regular season and playoffs ===
			Regular season									Playoffs
Season	Team	League	GP	W	L	T	MIN	GA	SO	GAA	SV%	GP	W	L	MIN	GA	SO	GAA	SV%
1989–90	Boston College High School	High-MA	20	12	0	0	1200	20	0	1.00	—	—	—	—	—	—	—	—	—
1990–91	Catholic Memorial Knights	High-MA	14	14	0	0	840	20	6	1.66	—	—	—	—	—	—	—	—	—
1991–92	Catholic Memorial Knights	High-MA	21	19	2	0	940	34	8	1.63	—	—	—	—	—	—	—	—	—
1992–93	University of Wisconsin–Madison	WCHA	26	15	8	1	1525	78	1	3.07	—	—	—	—	—	—	—	—	—
1993–94	University of Wisconsin–Madison	WCHA	40	24	13	1	2247	114	1	3.04	—	—	—	—	—	—	—	—	—
1994–95	Portland Pirates	AHL	55	30	14	11	3281	151	6	2.76	.909	—	—	—	—	—	—	—	—
1994–95	Washington Capitals	NHL	28	18	6	3	1604	57	4	2.13	.913	7	2	4	358	25	0	4.19	.834
1995–96	Washington Capitals	NHL	71	35	24	9	4069	153	9	2.26	.906	3	0	1	97	10	0	6.19	.744
1996–97	Washington Capitals	NHL	40	17	18	3	2293	105	1	2.75	.893	—	—	—	—	—	—	—	—
1996–97	Boston Bruins	NHL	19	5	13	0	1004	64	0	3.82	.871	—	—	—	—	—	—	—	—
1997–98	Providence Bruins	AHL	10	2	7	1	605	40	0	3.97	.878	—	—	—	—	—	—	—	—
1997–98	Boston Bruins	NHL	10	3	2	1	496	24	2	2.90	.893	—	—	—	—	—	—	—	—
1998–99	Cincinnati Cyclones	IHL	2	1	0	1	120	2	0	1.00	.962	—	—	—	—	—	—	—	—
1998–99	Providence Bruins	AHL	30	17	8	3	1750	68	3	2.33	.919	—	—	—	—	—	—	—	—
1998–99	St. Louis Blues	NHL	4	1	2	0	202	13	0	3.86	.829	—	—	—	—	—	—	—	—
NHL totals			172	79	65	16	9,668	416	16	2.58	.898	10	2	5	455	35	0	4.62	.816

=== International ===
Year	Team	Event	GP	W	L	T	MIN	GA	SO	GAA
1993	United States	WJC	4	2	2	0	240	14	0	3.50

Awards and achievements
Preceded by Darby Hendrickson	WCHA Rookie of the Year; 1992–93	Succeeded by Landon Wilson
Preceded by Frédéric Chabot	Aldege "Baz" Bastien Memorial Award; 1994–95	Succeeded by Manny Legace
Preceded by Dominik Hašek	Winner of the Vezina Trophy; 1995–96	Succeeded by Dominik Hašek
