= Aaron Miller (ice hockey) =

American ice hockey player (born 1971)

- Born: August 11, 1971 (age 54) Buffalo, New York, U.S.
- Height: 6 ft 3 in (191 cm)
- Weight: 200 lb (91 kg; 14 st 4 lb)
- Position: Defense
- Shot: Right
- Played for: Quebec Nordiques; Colorado Avalanche; Los Angeles Kings; Vancouver Canucks
- National team: United States
- NHL draft: 88th overall, 1989; New York Rangers
- Playing career: 1993–2008

Aaron Michael Miller (born August 11, 1971) is an American former professional ice hockey player. Over the course of his 14-year career as a defenseman in the National Hockey League (NHL), which lasted from 1994 to 2008, Miller played for the Quebec Nordiques/Colorado Avalanche, the Los Angeles Kings and the Vancouver Canucks. In 2002, he was selected as a member of United States hockey team at the 2002 Winter Olympics, where he won a silver medal. Prior to making his professional debut, Miller earned a degree in business from the University of Vermont.

== Early life ==
Miller was born and raised in Buffalo, New York, one of six children to Bill and Joan Miller. As a youth, he played in the 1984 Quebec International Pee-Wee Hockey Tournament with a minor ice hockey team from Buffalo. After playing forward at St. Francis High School and the Niagara Scenics in Buffalo, Miller was given a scholarship to the University of Vermont. Prior to attending the university, he was drafted 88th overall by the New York Rangers in the 1989 NHL entry draft. Miller was named team captain at the start of the 1992–93 season. He scored four goals and 13 assists in 30 games over the year, and was named to both the ECAC First All-Star Team and the NCAA East Second All-American Team. After four years at Vermont, he graduated with a degree in business. He finished his university career with 11 goals and 62 points in 122 games, later being named to Vermont's All-Time Men's Hockey Team, "The ECAC Years".

== Professional career ==
=== Quebec Nordiques/Colorado Avalanche ===
Though he was drafted by the Rangers in 1989, Miller opted to go to university and complete his degree. It was while he was at university that Miller was traded by the Rangers. On January 17, 1991, he was sent to the Quebec Nordiques (along with the Rangers' fifth-round draft pick, used to select Bill Lindsay) in the 1991 NHL entry draft in exchange for Joe Cirella.

After graduating from university, Miller made his professional debut in 1993 for the Nordiques minor league affiliate, the Cornwall Aces of the American Hockey League (AHL). On January 15, 1994, he made his NHL debut in Quebec against the Washington Capitals. Miller's first professional season ended with 1 NHL and 64 AHL games, where he scored four goals and ten assists. The next season, he appeared in nine games for the Nordiques, earning three assists. Miller also played 76 games for the Aces, finishing with totals of 4 goals and 22 points.

On June 21, 1995, the Quebec Nordiques transferred to Denver and became the Colorado Avalanche. Miller joined the team in Colorado and split the 1995–96 season between Colorado and Cornwall. In 62 games with Cornwall, he had 4 goals and 23 assists while going scoreless in five games with the Avalanche. Because he did not appear in enough games, Miller was not considered as part of the Stanley Cup-winning Avalanche team.

The 1996–97 season was Miller's first full season in the NHL. In a game against the Chicago Blackhawks on October 11, 1996, Miller scored his first NHL goal. He finished with 5 goals and 17 points while appearing in 56 games for the Avalanche, and his plus-minus was a +15, the best in the NHL for rookies. It also marked the Miller's Stanley Cup playoffs, where he registered 1 goal and 2 assists in 17 playoff games. The following season, he had 4 points in 55 games for the Avalanche, while going pointless in seven playoff games. Miller had his most productive season in 1998–99. After scoring a career-high 18 points in 76 games, Miller participated in 19 playoff games with a career-best five assists and six points. He would only play in 53 games the next season, but did suit up for every playoff game, scoring 1 goal and 1 assist in 17 games.

After 56 games with the Avalanche during the 2000–01 season, where he had 13 points, Miller was traded for the second time in his career. On February 21, 2001, Miller was sent to the Los Angeles Kings alongside Adam Deadmarsh, a player later to be named (Jared Aulin, who would be traded on March 22, 2001) and Colorado's first-round draft picks in the 2001 (Dave Steckel) and 2003 (Brian Boyle) Entry Drafts in exchange for Rob Blake and Steven Reinprecht. Miller was not originally meant to be traded, but the Kings insisted he be part of the deal.

=== Los Angeles Kings ===
Miller would finish the 2000–01 season with the Kings. In the final 13 games of the regular season, he had five assists, finishing with a career-best 14 assists and matching his career high of 18 points in one season, then contributed an assist in 13 playoff games. The Kings upset the Detroit Red Wings in six games during the first round. The Kings then played the Avalanche, Miller's former team, who prevailed in a hard-fought seven game series and went on to win the Stanley Cup for the second time.

In his first full season with the Kings, Miller played in 74 games for the team, scoring 5 goals and 12 assists during the 2001–02 season. At the conclusion of the regular season, Miller was named the winner of several Kings team awards: best defenseman, best defensive player and the teams unsung hero. During the playoffs, he went pointless while playing in all seven of the Kings' games. Abdominal surgery and a broken foot limited Miller to 49 games with the Kings the next season, recording one goal and five assists for six points.

In a game against the Atlanta Thrashers on December 10, 2003, Miller injured his neck. It would lead him to miss most of the 2003–04 season, appearing in 35 games and scoring one goal and two assists. The 2004–05 NHL lockout resulted in a cancelled 2004–05 season. Unlike many other players, Miller did not play in a different league. He returned to play for the 2005–06 season and earned eight assists in 56 games. For the first time in his career, Miller played in all 82 games during the 2006–07 season, again scoring eight assists.

=== Vancouver Canucks ===
As an unrestricted free agent, Miller signed a one-year, $1.5 million contract with the Vancouver Canucks on July 9, 2007, ending his time with the Kings. On December 18, 2007, Miller scored a goal against Martin Brodeur of the New Jersey Devils, his first goal in 193 games, a span lasting over four years. The goal, the game-winner, marked the longest stretch of Miller's career between scoring goals. In a game on March 6 against the Nashville Predators, Miller injured his shoulder and ultimately missed the remainder of the season. Following the conclusion of the 2007–08 season, in which he had eight assists in addition to the goal, Miller retired from professional hockey.

== International play ==
Medal record

Representing United States

Ice hockey

Olympic Games
Silver medal – second place	2002 Salt Lake City	

World Championships
Bronze medal – third place	2004 Czech Republic	

During his playing career Miller represented the United States in several international tournaments. His first appearance was at the 1991 World Junior Championships. He scored a goal and an assist in eight games. Miller was also chosen to play in the 2002 Olympic Winter Games in Salt Lake City. In six games, Miller went pointless as the Americans won the silver medal, and experience he referred to as "best part of [his] career." Two years later, he joined the bronze medal-winning American team at the 2004 Men's World Ice Hockey Championships. He contributed an assist in nine games. Later that year he participated in the 2004 World Cup of Hockey, and appeared in 5 games. Miller made a return to the World Championships in 2005, playing seven games and scoring two assists. He was named to the 2006 Olympic Winter Games in Turin, but pulled out due to back problems.

== Post-retirement ==
Miller resides in South Burlington, Vermont and is the owner of 11 Buffalo Wild Wings franchises with his business partner in Burlington, Vermont; Concord, Manchester, and Nashua, New Hampshire; Southington, Waterbury, and Windsor, Connecticut; Chicopee, Massachusetts; and Plattsburgh, New York. He also provided color commentary for select Vermont Catamounts men's ice hockey radio broadcasts from 2009 to 2010 on AM 620, WVMT. In 2015 he was inducted into the Greater Buffalo Sports Hall of Fame. He and his wife Kristy had three children: Grace, Ava, and Sullivan.

== Career statistics ==
=== Regular season and playoffs ===
			Regular season					Playoffs
Season	Team	League	GP	G	A	Pts	PIM	GP	G	A	Pts	PIM
1987–88	Niagara Scenics	NAHL	30	4	9	13	2	—	—	—	—	—
1988–89	Niagara Scenics	NAHL	59	24	38	62	60	—	—	—	—	—
1989–90	University of Vermont	HE	31	1	15	16	24	—	—	—	—	—
1990–91	University of Vermont	HE	30	3	7	10	22	—	—	—	—	—
1991–92	University of Vermont	HE	31	3	16	19	36	—	—	—	—	—
1992–93	University of Vermont	HE	30	4	13	17	16	—	—	—	—	—
1993–94	Quebec Nordiques	NHL	1	0	0	0	0	—	—	—	—	—
1993–94	Cornwall Aces	AHL	64	4	10	14	49	13	0	2	2	10
1994–95	Quebec Nordiques	NHL	9	0	3	3	6	—	—	—	—	—
1994–95	Cornwall Aces	AHL	76	4	18	22	69	—	—	—	—	—
1995–96	Colorado Avalanche	NHL	5	0	0	0	0	—	—	—	—	—
1995–96	Cornwall Aces	AHL	62	4	23	27	77	8	0	1	1	6
1996–97	Colorado Avalanche	NHL	56	5	12	17	15	17	1	2	3	10
1997–98	Colorado Avalanche	NHL	55	2	2	4	51	7	0	0	0	8
1998–99	Colorado Avalanche	NHL	76	5	13	18	42	19	1	5	6	10
1999–00	Colorado Avalanche	NHL	53	1	7	8	36	17	1	1	2	6
2000–01	Colorado Avalanche	NHL	56	4	9	13	29	—	—	—	—	—
2000–01	Los Angeles Kings	NHL	13	0	5	5	14	13	0	1	1	6
2001–02	Los Angeles Kings	NHL	74	5	12	17	54	7	0	0	0	0
2002–03	Los Angeles Kings	NHL	49	1	5	6	24	—	—	—	—	—
2003–04	Los Angeles Kings	NHL	35	1	2	3	32	—	—	—	—	—
2005–06	Los Angeles Kings	NHL	56	0	8	8	27	—	—	—	—	—
2006–07	Los Angeles Kings	NHL	82	0	8	8	60	—	—	—	—	—
2007–08	Vancouver Canucks	NHL	57	1	8	9	32	—	—	—	—	—
NHL totals			677	25	94	119	422	80	3	9	12	40

=== International ===
Year	Team	Event	GP	G	A	Pts	PIM
1991	United States	WJC	8	1	1	2	0
2002	United States	OLG	6	0	0	0	4
2004	United States	WC	9	0	1	1	4
2004	United States	WCH	5	0	0	0	4
2005	United States	WC	7	0	2	2	6
Junior totals			8	1	1	2	0
Senior totals			27	0	3	3	18

- All stats taken from NHL.com

== Awards ==
=== NCAA ===
Award	Year
All-ECAC Hockey Rookie Team	1989–90
All-ECAC Hockey First Team	1992–93
AHCA East Second-Team All-American	1992–93

=== Los Angeles Kings team awards ===
Award	Year
Outstanding Defenseman	2002
Defensive Player	2002
Unsung Hero	2002
