= Benny Lewis =

Irish author and blogger

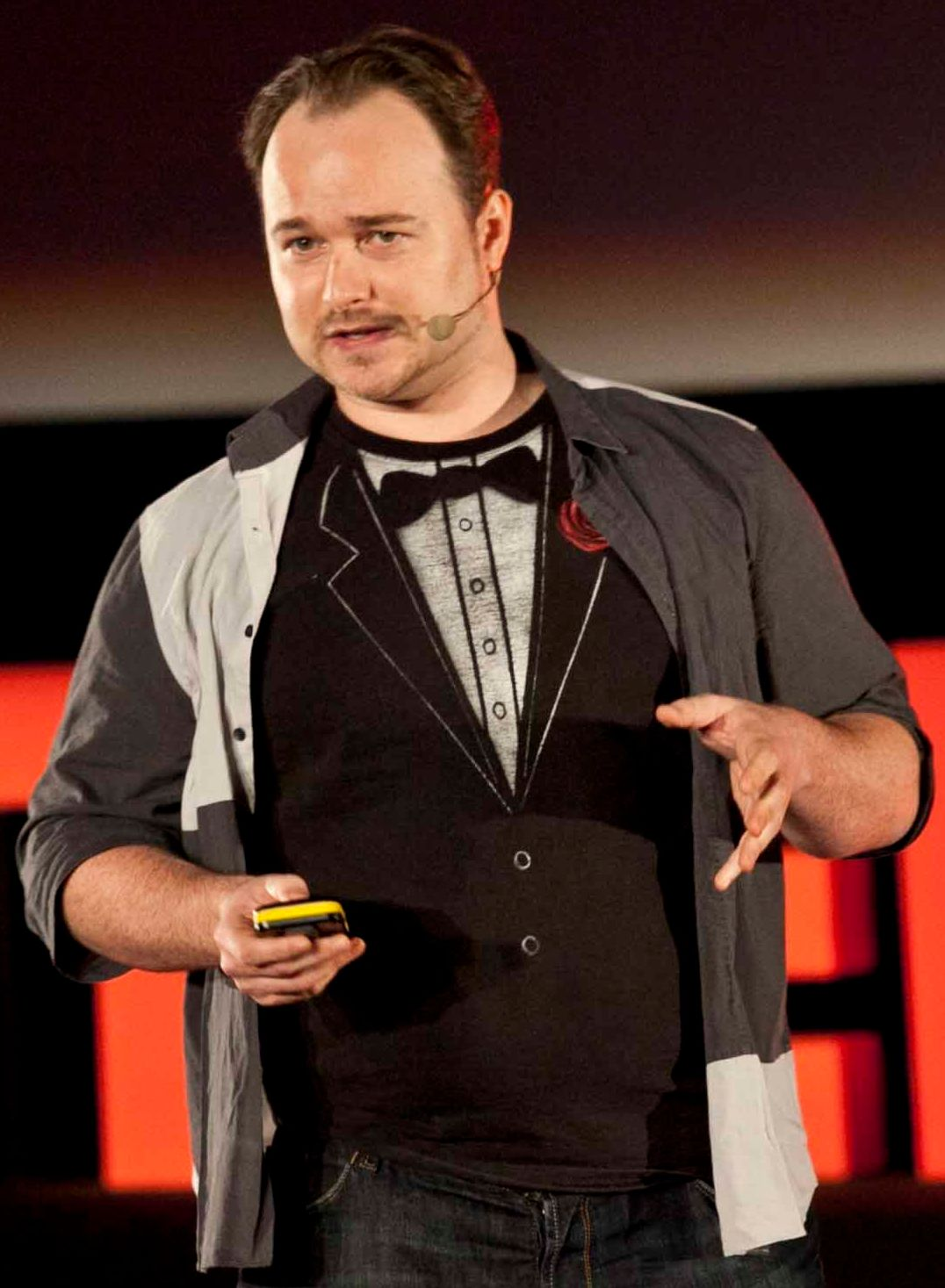
- Lewis at a TEDx event in Warsaw in 2013
- Born: Brendan Richard Lewis; 1981 or 1982 (age 43–44)
- Occupations: Author; blogger

Brendan Richard "Benny" Lewis (born 1981/1982) is an Irish author and blogger who defines himself as a "technomad language hacker". He is best known for his website Fluent in 3 Months, on which he documents personal attempts to learn languages within short time periods, typically three months.

Lewis is the author of the book Fluent in 3 Months (2014) as well as a language courses series titled Language Hacking, including Spanish, French, German, and Italian.

== Early life ==
Born in Ireland, Lewis has described himself as mediocre in languages at school, getting a C in German and just managing to pass his Irish language exams. He graduated in electronic engineering from University College Dublin and then spent time struggling to learn Spanish in Spain, where it took him over a year to learn the language. His frustration with conventional methods led him to take a different approach to language learning, as described in his book and website Fluent in 3 Months.

== Career ==
Lewis is the founder and CEO of the website Fluent in 3 Months.

He has given two talks on TEDx. In 2013, he was named a Traveler of the Year by National Geographic magazine.

He has authored five books, including Fluent in 3 Months (2014), as well as four course books written in collaboration with Teach Yourself: Language Hacking Spanish, Language Hacking French, Language Hacking German, and Language Hacking Italian. He has also coached and given private language lessons by telephone and Skype.

== Language learning approach ==
Lewis claims that anyone can learn a language to fluency in as little as three months. Lewis understands fluency as "social equivalency", meaning that he "can function in social situations pretty much the same in [his] target language as [he] would in [his] native one". His approach is to start speaking a new language from the very first day, ignoring mistakes and using very basic language like "me want go supermarket."

Lewis explains the name of his business Fluent in 3 Months as follows:

The name of the blog causes a lot of confusion for people when they first arrive on my site. I'm not promising any special time line for people studying a language; doing so would be ridiculous because the amount of work people put in is too varied. Most people take years to learn just the basics of a language because they do it so wrong, so of course a claim of “3 months” would sound arrogant to them. It's called “Fluent in 3 Months” because I move to a new country, usually for about 3 months and I tend to aim to speak the local language fluently. The name of the blog is from my objectives in both travel and language learning. This blog documents my own language learning journeys and shares the ideas that make it all possible. The title of the blog is an objective[,] not a promise of a magic solution for all.

== Language learning projects ==
To date, Lewis has documented attempts to learn over 20 languages to varying degrees of fluency over short time periods—typically three months—some successful, some not. He publicly shares his experiences on his website with a combination of blog posts and YouTube video footage. He started recording his efforts in 2009 partly to prove it was possible to learn a language fluently in three months.

His claims have been met with some scepticism. Noted polyglots like Steve Kaufmann have looked at his results and noted it is largely not possible to become fluent in a new language in such a short time. Other research indicates that a realistic time to learn languages such as English or French, without immersion, is 8 months as a minimum, depending on a number of variables.

=== Czech (2009) ===
On 1 June 2009, Lewis launched the Fluent in 3 Months blog with a post announcing he would learn "fluent" Czech within 3 months. After his 3-month mission, he expected to be able to:

have comfortable conversations with locals about a wide range of topics, without a strong accent and with a good enough command of the language for expressing myself clearly in many social situations and understanding as much as possible.

After 3 months, on 1 September 2009, Lewis stated that he had studied Czech for "two months" with a "casual part-time commitment" due to an increased workload to pay off a debt. He assessed himself as having reached a "pretty good level" in the language. however, he himself admitted he had failed to achieve his goal of achieving fluency in his 3 months of learning, partly because of its case system.

=== Brazilian Portuguese (2009) ===
In September 2009, Lewis announced that his next language mission was to spend three months in Brazil. He explained his aim for this mission as follows: "I want several Brazilians to have believed that not only am I speaking Portuguese as good as a native, but that I actually am a native." Before starting this mission Lewis had 8 months exposure to Portuguese, having lived in Brazil previously.

At the end of this project December 2009, Lewis stated that the mission had been a "partial success" with some Brazilians believing he was a native speaker for periods of up to 30 seconds. At one point he was put in a police cell for being cheeky to a Brazilian policewoman.

=== German (2010) ===
In 2010, Lewis announced that he planned to learn German to the level of "mastery" within a period of three months. He explained the mission as follows:

My mission will be to convince Germans that I'm a Berliner by the end of June, and to sit the Goethe-Zertifikat C2: Zentrale Oberstufenprüfung examination. The level required for this examination goes way beyond fluency; it is for Mastery of a language."

Prior to starting this mission, he had studied German for five years at school. He stated that those years of study had been "wasted", and that after all that time he still could not speak German.

At the end of the three-month project, Benny shared the results of the Goethe-Zertifikat C2: Zentrale Oberstufenprüfung examination. He stated that he was "very pleased" with the results adding that he had "passed" four out of the five elements of the exam. He failed the element on listening comprehension.

=== Chinese (2012) ===
Lewis made attempts at learning both Japanese and Chinese to levels of fluency in the space of three months. He admitted he found these the most difficult languages he had attempted to learn and only partially achieved the goals he set himself for these languages. That said, he did achieve some success in learning these languages.

Lewis announced in January 2012 that he would undertake a project to learn Mandarin to fluency, specifically stating a goal to attain C1 level in the European Language level Framework in the space of three months. After endeavouring to learn the language, he was assessed by a Chinese language teacher after 5 months (28 May 2012) who assessed his ability in detail, stating that his spoken ability was "very impressive", however he was assessed at a B1:lower intermediate level, below what he had desired to achieve. His listening skills were assessed as "very good". His reading and writing abilities were assessed to be at a level below B1 and after 5 months, and overall, he failed to achieve the level of fluency (C1 Level) he had stated he was aiming for at the start of the "mission".

Following the challenge Lewis reflected that his unfamiliarity with the norms of Taiwanese social interaction had made learning Mandarin using his methods more challenging than languages he had previously studied.

=== Japanese (2013) ===
In 2013 Lewis announced that he would attempt to learn Japanese to the level of fluency (N2 level the second highest level in the Japanese-Language Proficiency Test), in the space of three months. This was met with some skepticism by fellow polyglots/language bloggers including fellow hyperpolyglot Steve Kaufmann, who said it was not possible to achieve fluency in Japanese in that period of time. After starting the project, Lewis initially pushed the deadline for achieving fluency back by two weeks, then ultimately stopped the project after failing to achieve fluency, achieving only a basic level of Japanese.

=== Awards ===
Lewis was awarded a "Language Ambassador of the Year" award in 2012. He was named National Geographic Traveler of the Year in 2013.

== Publications ==
- Lewis, Benny (2014). Fluent in 3 Months: How Anyone at Any Age Can Learn to Speak Any Language from Anywhere in the World (PDF). New York: HarperOne. ISBN 9780062282699. Archived from the original (PDF) on 7 January 2018.
- Lewis, Benny (2016). Language Hacking French: A Conversation Course for Beginners. London: John Murray Learning. ISBN 9781473633094.
- Lewis, Benny (2016). Language Hacking German: A Conversation Course for Beginners. London: John Murray Learning. ISBN 9781473633155.
- Lewis, Benny (2016). Language Hacking Italian: A Conversation Course for Beginners. London: John Murray Learning. ISBN 9781473633124.
- Lewis, Benny (2016). Language Hacking Spanish: A Conversation Course for Beginners. London: John Murray Learning. ISBN 9781473633216.
