= Steve Kaufmann =

Canadian YouTuber and polyglot (born 1945)

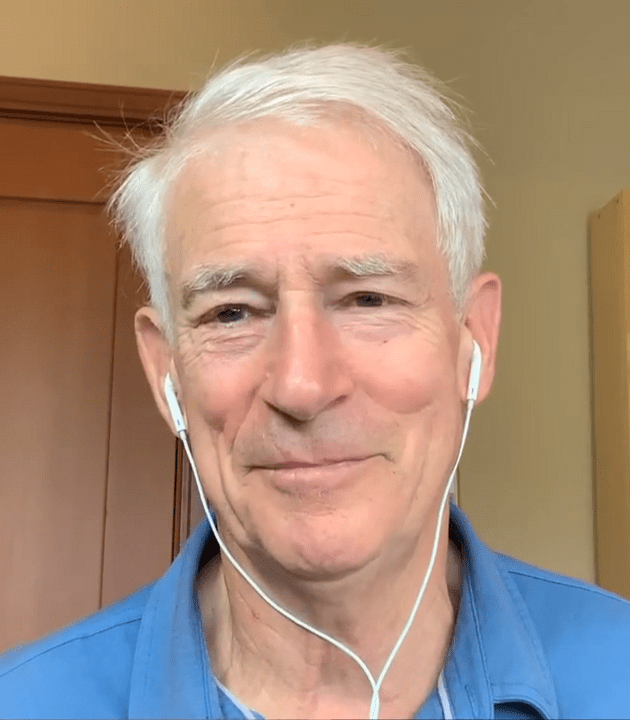
- Kaufmann in 2020
- Born: October 8, 1945 (age 80); Sweden
- Children: Eric; Mark

YouTube information
- Channel: Steve Kaufmann - lingosteve
- Years active: 2007–present
- Subscribers: 1.47 million
- Views: 182 million
- Last updated: March 2026

Steve Kaufmann (born October 8, 1945) (Note: In one of his YouTube videos, Kaufmann states that October 8 is his birthday. In The Linguist: A Personal Guide to Language Learning, he states that he was born in 1945.) is a Canadian internet personality and polyglot known for his language-learning content on YouTube, and his online language-learning platform LingQ, which he co-founded.

== Background ==
Kaufmann was born in Sweden in 1945 to Jewish parents from Prostějov in Czechoslovakia, now the Czech Republic. His parents spoke Czech and German. He grew up in Montreal, Canada, after he and his family moved there in 1951 when he was five.

In June 1962, Kaufmann quit his construction job and worked aboard a German tramp steamer in exchange for passage to Europe. After a week in London, he visited Belgium, then spent a year in Grenoble, France. He studied politics at the Institut d'études politiques (Institute of Political Studies, commonly known as Sciences Po) and studied French in Paris.

He hitchhiked through Europe, picking up basic language skills in Spain, Italy and Germany. He went on to join the Canadian diplomatic service, where he began learning Mandarin Chinese in Hong Kong full-time in 1969. When he was re-posted to the Embassy of Canada, Tokyo, in the early 1970s, he learned Japanese.

After his role as a trade commissioner, he used his language abilities in commercial trade, living in Japan for nine years. He eventually learned more languages, mostly later in life.

Along with his son Mark, Steve co-founded LingQ, a language learning platform in 2007.

== Current work ==
"The best way to learn a language is to massively ingest it, by listening and reading. Listening and reading are so powerful. If you can read the books, you know the language. To get to know a language takes a lot of time and a lot of interacting with it — and a lot of that time has to be on your own. I think it’s better to work on comprehension and vocabulary without pressure to reproduce the language (by speaking)."

—Kaufmann on language learning

Kaufmann appears at conferences to speak on his language learning techniques and abilities. He also has social media channels where he discusses language learning, primarily to assist learners.

He was a founding organizer of the North American Polyglot Symposium. He travels to learn languages, and has given interviews in native languages on television and on YouTube, including in Chinese (both Mandarin and Cantonese), Russian and Ukrainian. He has been a regular contributor to the Huffington Post.

== Language learning ==
Kaufmann has spent over 50 years studying languages. He advocates total immersion in the learning process. He places great emphasis on absorbing the language by reading texts and by not worrying about unfamiliar words, believing that they are gradually acquired through repeated reading. Though he supports using techniques such as flashcards for memorizing difficult words, he spends most of his learning time listening to native speakers and reading. He is particularly fond of reading books on the history of the country or region of the language he is learning, written in that language. He prefers not to have a fixed study schedule and enjoys listening to content in his target languages while performing other tasks. He believes that age does not impede learning a new language and that older people can learn languages as well as younger people. He believes mistakes are a natural part of the learning process, and that people can be considered fluent despite making mistakes.

Kaufmann started learning Russian, his ninth language, when he was 60. As of 2026, he has an understanding of 20 languages, though his ability to speak and write in them to a highly proficient level varies considerably. He has said that he rarely writes in the languages, and that speaking languages he has not used for a while can be initially challenging.

As of May 2023, Kaufmann speaks these languages to varying degrees:

- English
- French
- Mandarin Chinese
- Cantonese
- Japanese
- Korean
- Russian
- Swedish
- German
- Italian
- Spanish
- Portuguese
- Ukrainian
- Czech
- Slovak
- Romanian
- Polish

He has also learned some Greek and Turkish and is currently learning Arabic and Persian. In 2026, he stated that after studying Turkish he will focus on Arabic and Persian, and spends time listening to Arabic TV series and Al Jazeera news, and reading books on Arabic and Persian history.

Prominent language-acquisition scholar Stephen Krashen has studied Kaufmann's approach to learning, and those of other polyglots such as Kató Lomb. Krashen claims the success of Kaufmann and other polyglots as independent support for his own ideas on second language learning, and sees Kaufmann's approach as a model for other language learners. He has praised Kaufmann as "really good, no question", and described him as "my language therapist, helping me."

== Personal life ==
Steve Kaufmann is the father of political scientist Eric Kaufmann and ice hockey player Mark Kaufmann.

== See also ==
- List of polyglots
