= Bob Marshall (ice hockey) =

Canadian ice hockey player

- Born: April 11, 1972 (age 54) North York, Ontario, Canada
- Height: 6 ft 0 in (183 cm)
- Weight: 182 lb (83 kg; 13 st 0 lb)
- Position: Defenseman
- Shot: Left
- Played for: Miami; Saint John Flames; Baltimore Bandits; Hershey Bears; Columbus Cottonmouths; Chicago Wolves; Revierlöwen Oberhausen; San Angelo Outlaws; Fort Wayne Komets
- NHL draft: 129th overall, 1991; Calgary Flames
- Playing career: 1990–2002

Robert "Bobby" Marshall (born April 11, 1972) is a Canadian ice hockey coach and former defenseman who was an All-American for Miami.

== Career ==
Marshall joined Miami in George Gwozdecky's second year behind the bench and arrived just in time for the then-Redskins to post their worst record, winning just 5 games in 1991. Despite the terrible year, Marshall acquitted himself well enough to get drafted by the Calgary Flames after the season.

Miami had a dramatic turnaround the following year, posting its first winning season in over a decade and winning the first playoff round in program history. Marshall's third season saw even better results, with Miami finishing atop the CCHA, reaching the conference championship and receiving a bid to the NCAA tournament all for the first time in team history. Marshall's point production nearly doubled throughout the season and he was named an All-American while leading the team with 43 assists. Marshall was named an alternate captain for his senior season and his scoring output decreased along with the team's record. Miami still finished with a winning record but the team was stopped in the conference quarterfinals.

After graduating, Marshall began his professional career in Calgary's farm system. He played with the Saint John Flames for just over a season before he was traded to Anaheim for Jarrod Skalde. He spent the better part of two seasons with the Baltimore Bandits but was not resigned by the Mighty Ducks once his rookie contract ended. Marshall played the majority of the 1998 season in the CHL and then headed to Europe. At the end of the '99 season he returned to North America and helped the San Angelo Outlaws reach the President's Cup Final but was back in the DEL the following year. Marshall's playing career ended in 2002 after parts of two more seasons in lower-minor hockey and he transitioned into coaching. In 2003, he was inducted into the Miami University Athletics Hall of Fame.

Marshall first job was as an assistant for the Brampton Battalion though it only lasted for one season. He continued to coach at the junior level for several years, including a stint as the head coach for the Don Mills Flyers, but was forced to halt his career after suffering a stroke in January 2020.

== Statistics ==
=== Regular season and playoffs ===
			Regular Season					Playoffs
Season	Team	League	GP	G	A	Pts	PIM	GP	G	A	Pts	PIM
1989–90	Wexford Raiders	MetJHL	42	3	24	27	70	—	—	—	—	—
1990–91	Miami	CCHA	37	3	15	18	44	—	—	—	—	—
1991–92	Miami	CCHA	40	5	20	25	48	—	—	—	—	—
1992–93	Miami	CCHA	40	2	43	45	40	—	—	—	—	—
1993–94	Miami	CCHA	38	3	24	27	76	—	—	—	—	—
1994–95	Saint John Flames	AHL	77	7	24	31	62	5	0	0	0	4
1995–96	Saint John Flames	AHL	10	0	5	5	8	—	—	—	—	—
1995–96	Baltimore Bandits	AHL	67	3	28	31	38	12	2	8	10	8
1996–97	Baltimore Bandits	AHL	79	1	35	36	45	3	0	1	1	4
1997–98	Hershey Bears	AHL	6	0	4	4	4	—	—	—	—	—
1997–98	Minnesota Moose	IHL	2	0	0	0	0	—	—	—	—	—
1997–98	Columbus Cottonmouths	CHL	55	11	63	74	79	13	2	12	14	28
1998–99	Revierlöwen Oberhausen	DEL	52	4	16	20	50	—	—	—	—	—
1998–99	San Angelo Outlaws	WPHL	3	0	2	2	0	17	2	11	13	12
1999–00	Revierlöwen Oberhausen	DEL	56	2	8	10	44	12	0	1	1	4
2000–01	Columbus Cottonmouths	CHL	68	6	46	52	95	14	0	6	6	16
2001–02	Fort Wayne Komets	UHL	24	3	12	15	16	—	—	—	—	—
NCAA totals			156	13	102	15	208	—	—	—	—	—
AHL totals			239	11	96	107	157	20	2	9	11	16
CHL totals			123	17	109	126	174	27	2	18	20	44
DEL totals			108	6	24	30	94	12	0	1	1	4

== Awards and honors ==
Award	Year
All-CCHA Second Team	1992–93
AHCA West Second-Team All-American	1992–93
CCHA All-Tournament Team	1993
All-CCHA Second Team	1993–94

Awards and achievements
Preceded by Joby Messier	CCHA Best Defensive Defenseman; 1992–93	Succeeded by Brent Brekke
