= Jessica Beinecke =

American broadcaster

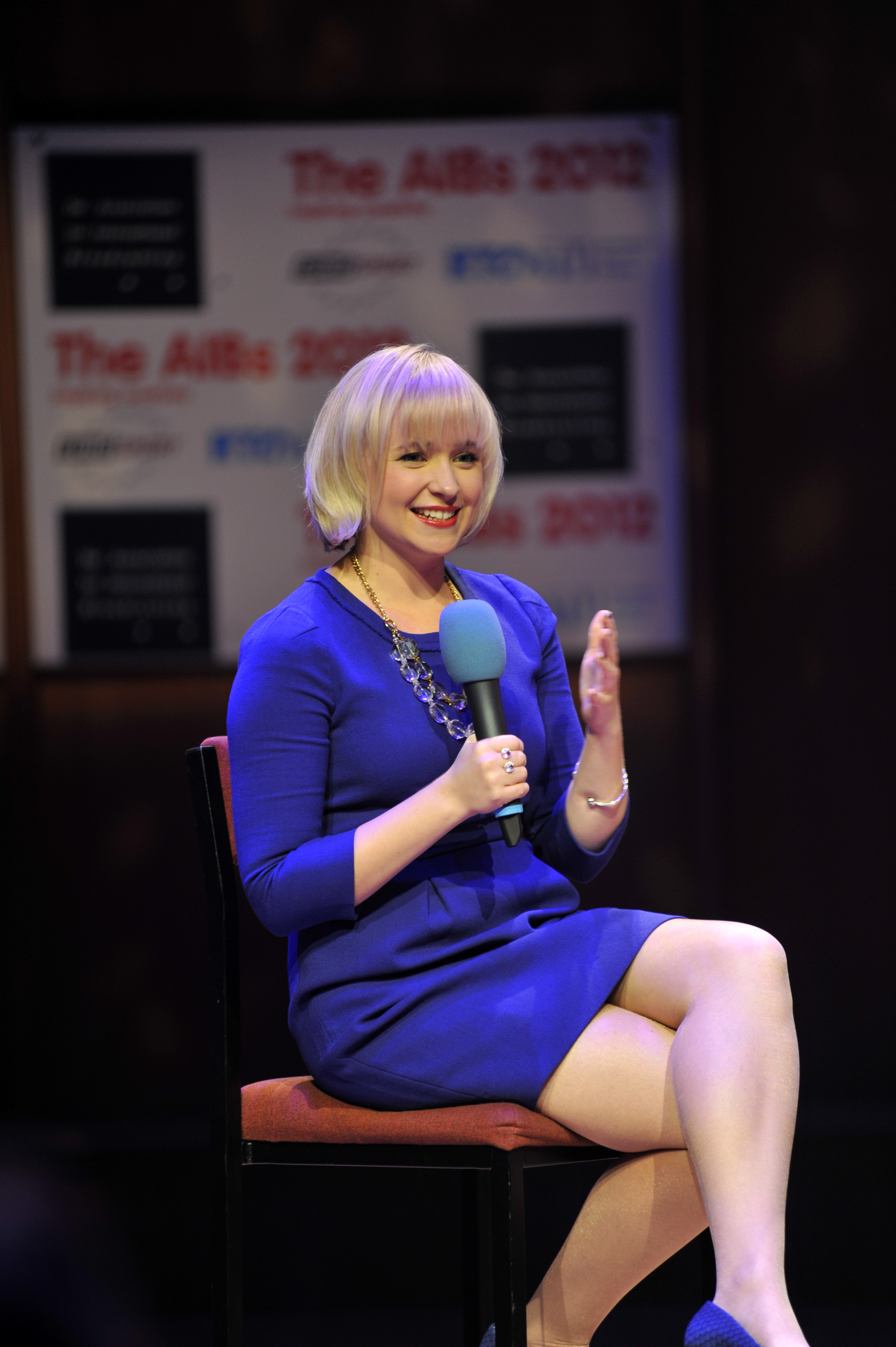
Jessica Beinecke getting an AIB award in 2012 in London

Jessica Beinecke [Chinese: 白洁 (Bai Jie)] (born about 1987) is an American educator, entertainer, videographer and online personality in China. She is the founder of production company JM Beinecke, Inc. Her program Jessica白洁 has achieved widespread popularity in Mainland China and Taiwan. Her personality and program have been covered in both American and Chinese media. She is a graduate of the E. W. Scripps School of Journalism of Ohio University and received a graduate degree at Middlebury College in Vermont.

PBS said Beinecke is "one of the best-known women in China... China's newest English-language star. Her teaching is very interactive and communicative." In 2012 she won the Association for International Broadcasting (AIB) Founders’ Award for her podcast "OMG! Meiyu".

Beinecke was named on Foreign Policy's "Pacific Power Index" as one of the 50 people shaping the future of the US-China relationship "For taking American culture and language viral on the Chinese web... Beinecke has harnessed the power of social media to teach English — and Chinese — to countless eager language learners."
