= Ryo Takeuchi (director) =

Japanese filmmaker

- 竹内 亮
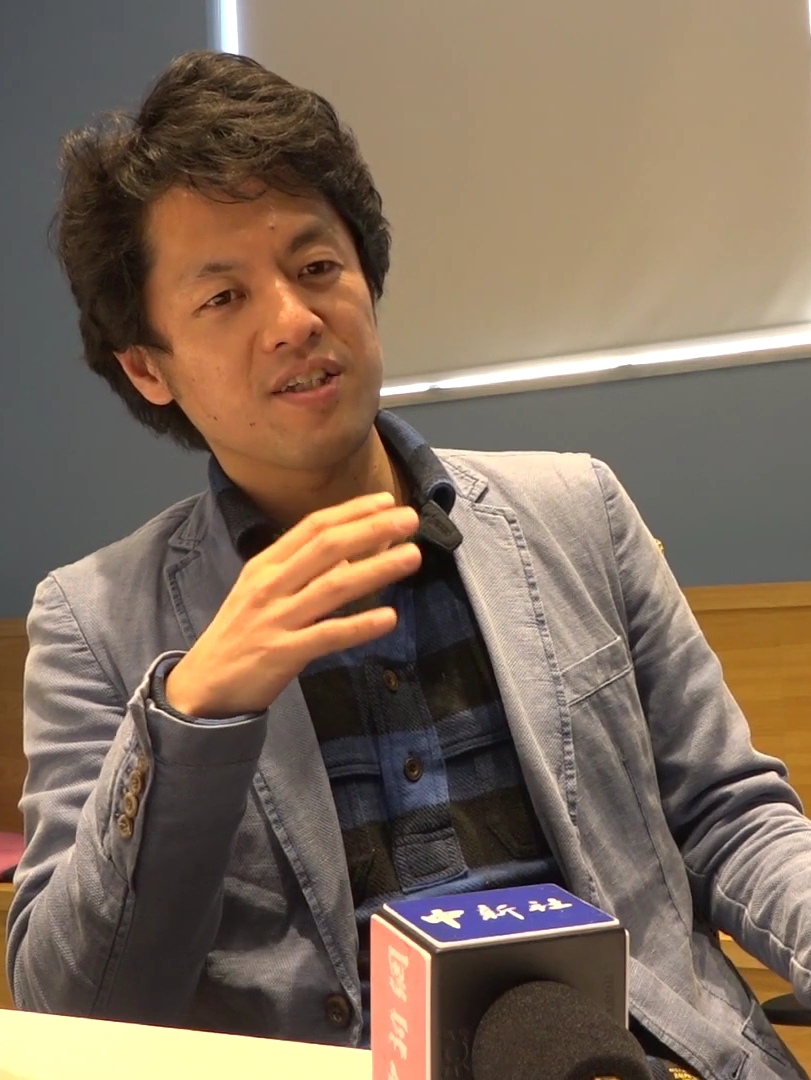
- Born: October 23, 1978 (age 47); Abiko, Chiba, Japan
- Education: Nanjing University
- Occupations: Director, filmmaker
- Years active: 2008–present
- Spouse: Zhao Ping
- Children: 2

Ryo Takeuchi (竹内 亮; born 23 October 1978), also known as "Uncle Liang" (亮叔; Liàng Shū) to his followers and fans in China, is a Japanese filmmaker best known for his documentaries about China's efforts in combating the coronavirus, including Long Time No See, Wuhan and China's Post-Pandemic Era: Winning Against All Odds.

== Biography ==
Ryo Takeuchi was born in Abiko, Chiba, Japan on 23 October 1978. After graduating from high school, he learned to make films at specialized schools. He used to work for NHK. Ryo Takeuchi's connections with China began in 2002, when he was in Shanghai, Zhejiang and Jiangsu shooting a documentary about mahjong. Over the years, he has traveled frequently between China and Japan to make films.

In August 2013, he emigrated to China with his wife Zhao Ping. He pursued advanced studies at Nanjing University. In 2014, he founded the Hezhimeng Culture Communication Co., Ltd. and produced the documentary series The Reason I Live Here.

In 2020, he rose to fame for his hit documentary series titled Nanjing's Anti-epidemic Scene and Long Time No See, Wuhan that captured how regular Chinese responded to and recovered from the COVID-19 epidemic.

== Personal life ==
Ryo Takeuchi is married to Zhao Ping (赵萍). They have a son and a daughter.

== Works ==
Year	English title	Original title	Notes
2011	Nagae Takashi to ji no dai kikō	長江 天と地の大紀行	NHK documentary
2015–present	The Reason I Live Here	我住在这里的理由	
2020	Nanjing's Anti-epidemic Scene	南京抗疫现场	
2021	Long Time No See, Wuhan	好久不见武汉	
2021	China’s Post-Pandemic Era: Winning Against All Odds	后疫情时代	
2021	Beyond the Mountain	走进大凉山	
2021	Faces of HUAWEI	华为的100张面孔	
2022	The Yangtze River	再会長江 -The Yangtze River-	
