= Landon Wilson =

American ice hockey player (born 1975)

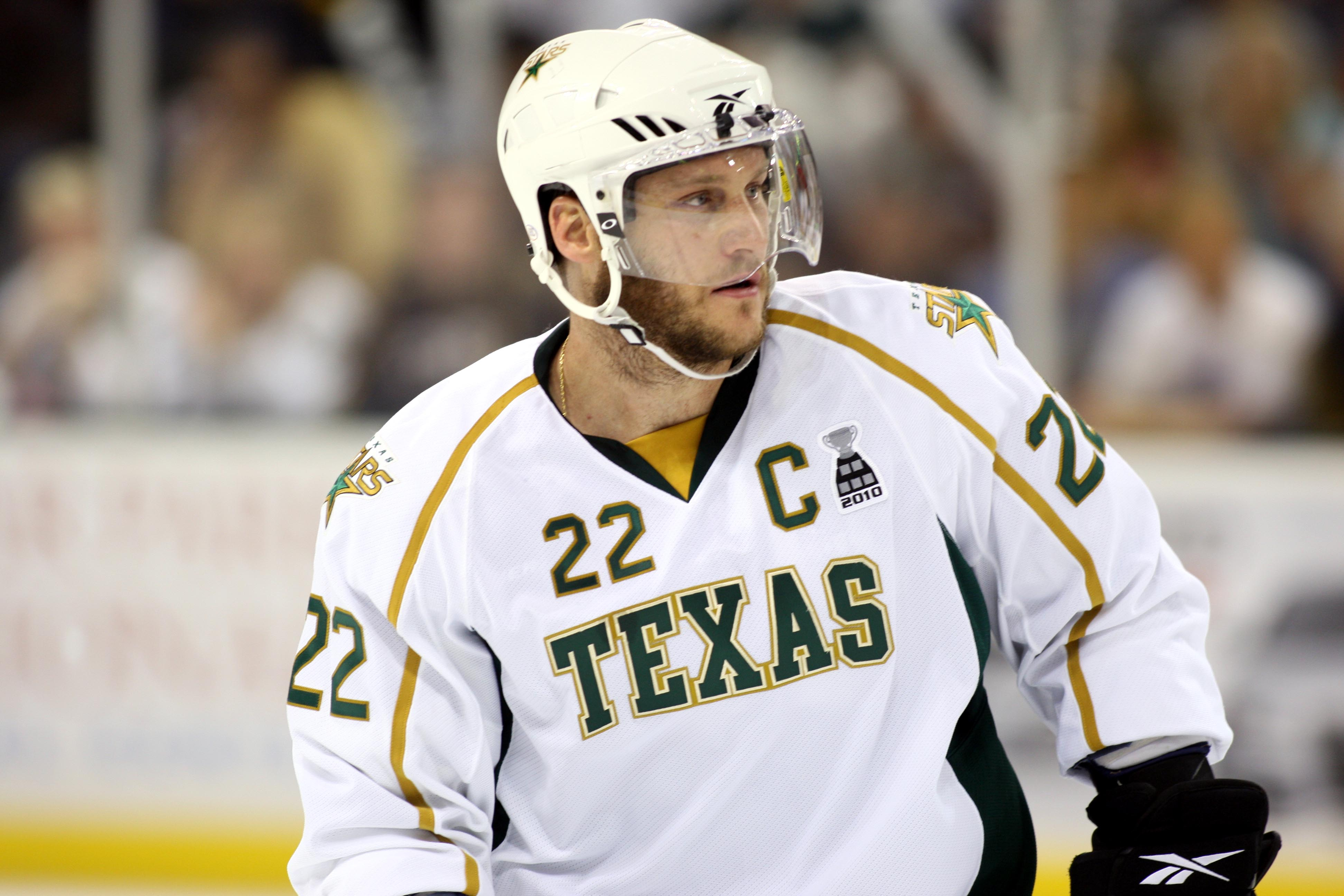
- Wilson with the Texas Stars in 2010
- Born: March 13, 1975 (age 51) St. Louis, Missouri, U.S.
- Height: 6 ft 3 in (191 cm)
- Weight: 226 lb (103 kg; 16 st 2 lb)
- Position: Right wing
- Shot: Right
- Played for: Colorado Avalanche; Boston Bruins; Phoenix Coyotes; Pittsburgh Penguins; Dallas Stars; Blues; HC Davos; HC Lugano
- National team: United States
- NHL draft: 19th overall, 1993; Toronto Maple Leafs
- Playing career: 1995–2010

Landon Wilson (born March 13, 1975) is an American former professional ice hockey right winger who last played for the Texas Stars of the AHL, where he served as team captain. He is the son of former NHL forward Rick Wilson.

== Early life ==
Landon Wilson was born on March 13, 1975, in St. Louis, Missouri. At the time, his father Rick Wilson was in the first of his two seasons playing for the St. Louis Blues. The Wilson family went on to move eight times over the next 18 years as a result of Rick's playing career and coaching career. As a youth, Wilson played in the 1989 Quebec International Pee-Wee Hockey Tournament with a minor ice hockey team from Oyster Bay, New York.

By 1989, the Wilson family settled in the Los Angeles, California, area where Rick spent three seasons on the coaching staff of the Los Angeles Kings from 1989 to 1992. Landon spent his first three years of high school at El Segundo High School, where he played football quarterback and led the high school to league championships in 1990 and 1991. While living in the Los Angeles area, Landon also played hockey for the Junior Kings, who won the national 17-and-under championship in 1992.

London's father was hired as an assistant coach with the Minnesota North Stars in 1992, and Landon gave up a promising senior year of football at El Segundo due to his family's move to Minnesota. As a result of the move, Landon decided to focus on hockey rather than football during his senior year of high school.

Instead of moving with his parents to Eden Prairie, Minnesota, Landon moved to a billet home in Iowa and joined the Dubuque Fighting Saints of the junior United States Hockey League. Wilson finished his senior year of high school at Dubuque Senior High School while playing for the Fighting Saints.

== Playing career ==
Wilson was drafted 19th overall in the 1993 NHL entry draft by the Toronto Maple Leafs. Wilson made his NHL debut with the Stanley Cup winning Colorado Avalanche in the 1995–96 season. However, he didn't play enough games to qualify for engraving his name into the Stanley Cup. Wilson has also played for the Boston Bruins, Phoenix Coyotes and Pittsburgh Penguins. Wilson has played 375 career NHL games, scoring 53 goals and 66 assists for 119 points.

While playing with the Coyotes in December 2002, Wilson received a partially blinding eye injury in one eye when a flying puck collided with his eye while he was not wearing a visor. He missed the rest of the season, but was able to return the next year with a visor which he wore for the rest of his career. In 2004–05, he played for Espoo Blues in Finland. After that he moved to Switzerland to play with HC Davos. After one season in Davos he moved to HC Lugano.

On July 3, 2008, Wilson returned to North America and signed with the Dallas Stars. He was then reassigned to Grand Rapids Griffins of the American Hockey League to start the 2008–09 season.

== Career statistics ==
=== Regular season and playoffs ===
			Regular season					Playoffs
Season	Team	League	GP	G	A	Pts	PIM	GP	G	A	Pts	PIM
1991–92	California Jr. Kings	WSJHL	38	50	42	92	135	—	—	—	—	—
1992–93	Dubuque Fighting Saints	USHL	43	29	36	65	284	—	—	—	—	—
1993–94	University of North Dakota	WCHA	35	18	15	33	147	—	—	—	—	—
1994–95	University of North Dakota	WCHA	31	7	16	23	141	—	—	—	—	—
1994–95	Cornwall Aces	AHL	8	4	4	8	25	13	3	4	7	68
1995–96	Cornwall Aces	AHL	53	21	13	34	154	8	1	3	4	22
1995–96	Colorado Avalanche	NHL	7	1	0	1	6	—	—	—	—	—
1996–97	Colorado Avalanche	NHL	9	1	2	3	23	—	—	—	—	—
1996–97	Boston Bruins	NHL	40	7	10	17	49	—	—	—	—	—
1996–97	Providence Bruins	AHL	2	2	1	3	2	10	3	4	7	16
1997–98	Providence Bruins	AHL	42	18	10	28	146	—	—	—	—	—
1997–98	Boston Bruins	NHL	28	1	5	6	7	1	0	0	0	0
1998–99	Boston Bruins	NHL	22	3	3	6	17	8	1	1	2	8
1998–99	Providence Bruins	AHL	48	31	22	53	89	11	7	1	8	19
1999–00	Boston Bruins	NHL	40	1	3	4	18	—	—	—	—	—
1999–00	Providence Bruins	AHL	17	5	5	10	45	9	2	3	5	38
2000–01	Phoenix Coyotes	NHL	70	18	13	31	92	—	—	—	—	—
2001–02	Phoenix Coyotes	NHL	47	7	12	19	46	4	0	0	0	12
2001–02	Springfield Falcons	AHL	2	2	1	3	2	—	—	—	—	—
2002–03	Phoenix Coyotes	NHL	31	6	8	14	26	—	—	—	—	—
2003–04	Phoenix Coyotes	NHL	35	1	3	4	16	—	—	—	—	—
2003–04	Pittsburgh Penguins	NHL	19	5	1	6	31	—	—	—	—	—
2004–05	Blues	FIN	37	8	11	19	80	—	—	—	—	—
2005–06	HC Davos	NLA	36	27	14	41	127	11	5	3	8	40
2006–07	HC Lugano	NLA	35	20	11	31	67	6	3	2	5	12
2007–08	HC Lugano	NLA	30	13	7	20	67	—	—	—	—	—
2008–09	Grand Rapids Griffins	AHL	15	8	7	15	37	—	—	—	—	—
2008–09	Dallas Stars	NHL	27	2	6	8	21	—	—	—	—	—
2009–10	Texas Stars	AHL	11	4	1	5	11	19	1	6	7	20
NHL totals			375	53	66	119	352	13	1	1	2	20

=== International ===
Year	Team	Event	GP	G	A	Pts	PIM
1995	United States	WJC	7	3	2	5	37
2001	United States	WC	9	1	1	2	4
Junior totals			7	3	2	5	37
Senior totals			9	1	1	2	4

== Awards and honors ==
Award	Year
All-WCHA Rookie Team	1994
WCHA Rookie of the Year	1994
AHL First All-Star Team	1999

Sporting positions
Preceded by Kenny Jönsson	Toronto Maple Leafs first-round draft pick 1993	Succeeded by Éric Fichaud
Awards and achievements
Preceded by Jim Carey	WCHA Rookie of the Year; 1993–94	Succeeded by Mike Crowley
