= Clayton Keller =

American ice hockey player (born 1998)

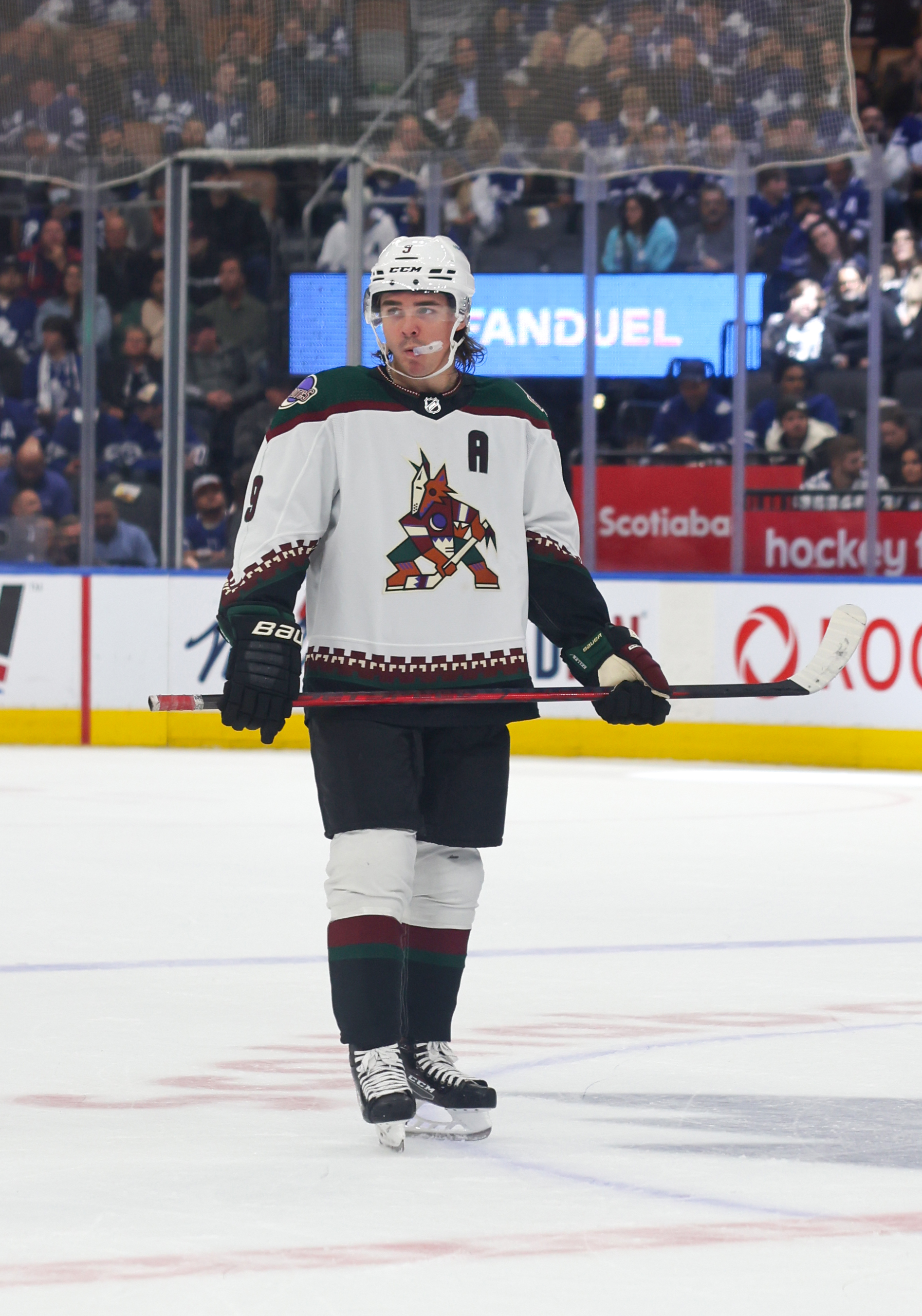
- Keller with the Arizona Coyotes in 2022
- Born: July 29, 1998 (age 28) Chesterfield, Missouri, U.S.
- Height: 5 ft 10 in (178 cm)
- Weight: 175 lb (79 kg; 12 st 7 lb)
- Position: Forward
- Shoots: Left
- NHL team Former teams: Utah Mammoth; Arizona Coyotes
- National team: United States
- NHL draft: 7th overall, 2016; Arizona Coyotes
- Playing career: 2017–present

Clayton Davis Keller (born July 29, 1998) is an American professional ice hockey player who is a forward and captain for the Utah Mammoth of the National Hockey League (NHL). The Arizona Coyotes selected him seventh overall in the 2016 NHL entry draft. He is described as a versatile forward who can play both as a center and winger at a high level and has filled both roles for the Coyotes and Mammoth organizations.

Born in Chesterfield, Missouri, and raised in Swansea, Illinois, Keller was part of a group of skilled young hockey players around his age growing up in the St. Louis area. He spent two years attending Shattuck-Saint Mary's before joining the USA Hockey National Team Development Program in 2014, where he set a program record with 189 points in two seasons. While the Windsor Spitfires of the Ontario Hockey League selected him in the 2014 OHL Draft, Keller attended Boston University to play college ice hockey for the Terriers in 2016. In his one season there, he was named the Hockey East Rookie of the Year and won the Tim Taylor Award for the top NCAA Division I rookie. He left Boston University after one season, joining the Coyotes for the end of the 2016–17 season.

Playing in every game during his first two seasons of professional ice hockey, Keller led the Coyotes with 65 points in 2017–18 and 47 points the following season, and he was an NHL All-Star in 2019. Keller made his postseason debut with Arizona in the 2020 Stanley Cup playoffs, where they were eliminated by the Colorado Avalanche in the first round (after winning the best-of-five qualifying round versus the Nashville Predators). He recorded his 200th career point and received his second All-Star Game selection during the 2021–22 season, but suffered a season-ending leg injury at the end of March. He played all 82 games in the 2022–23 season and tied the Coyotes single-season points record with 86 points, along with earning his third All-Star Game selection. Following the Coyotes' folding and transfer of hockey assets to the Utah Mammoth, Keller was named the first captain in Utah franchise history ahead of the 2024–25 season.

== Early life ==
Keller was born on July 29, 1998, in Chesterfield, Missouri, and he was raised in Swansea, Illinois by parents Bryan and Kelley Keller. Keller and his younger brother Jake would play hockey in the basement of their family home while attending Wolf Branch School District 113, the walls of which were painted to look like an ice hockey rink and were decorated with Keller's favorite National Hockey League (NHL) players: Sidney Crosby, Patrick Kane, Pavel Datsyuk, Alexander Ovechkin, and Evgeni Malkin. He became interested in ice hockey at the age of three, when his mother took him to a high school game, and he joined a contingent of other St. Louis-area players around his age, including Luke Opilka, Luke Kunin, and Matthew Tkachuk. In 2010 and 2011, Keller played in the Quebec International Pee-Wee Hockey Tournament with the St. Louis Blues minor ice hockey affiliate.

In 2012, Keller joined the ice hockey team at Shattuck-Saint Mary's, a boarding school in Faribault, Minnesota, and the alma mater of NHL players Sidney Crosby, Jonathan Toews, and Kyle Okposo. He scored 58 goals and recorded 129 points in 60 games during the 2012–13 season. After playing as a center during his first year with Shattuck-Saint Mary's, Keller moved to the wing for the 2013–14 season. After recording 94 goals and 112 assists in two seasons with Shattuck-St. Mary's, winning a national championship in the process, Keller joined the USA Hockey National Team Development Program (NTDP) for the 2014–15 season. After registering 34 goals and 82 points in 60 games that season, Keller added another 37 goals and 107 points in 62 games during the 2015–16 season, the second-highest single-season point total in program history. He spent two seasons in the NTDP, with 71 goals and 118 assists for 189 career points, setting the program record until 2019, when he was surpassed by Jack Hughes.

== Playing career ==
=== College ===
As the 2016 NHL entry draft approached, Keller had committed to playing college ice hockey for the Boston University Terriers, but he also had the option to play junior ice hockey in Canada, as the Windsor Spitfires of the Ontario Hockey League had selected him in the second round, 40th overall, of the 2014 OHL Draft. Keller was one of five players from the St. Louis area who were selected in the first round of the 2016 draft, taken seventh overall by the Arizona Coyotes. On August 3, 2016, Keller turned down the Spitfires, choosing instead to attend Boston University.

Keller scored his first collegiate goal in his first game, Boston University's 6–1 season-opening rout of Colgate on October 6, 2016. He was injured during the Terriers' 3–0 win over Northeastern at the start of November, with sophomore Jordan Greenway taking his place as Boston's second-line center in his absence. He missed seven games with the injury, returning to put up two goals and six points in three December games, enough to be named the Hockey East Rookie of the Month. He won the award again in January, when he had five goals and 11 points in nine games, and February, when he had seven goals and 12 points in eight games. Keller finished the season with 19 goals and 40 points in 31 games. In addition to being a unanimous selection to the Hockey East All-Rookie Team, Keller was a Hockey East Second Team All-Star, the Hockey East Rookie of the Year, and the recipient of the Tim Taylor Award for the top NCAA Division I rookie men's ice hockey player.

Despite a late-game goal from Keller, the Terriers were eliminated from the 2017 Hockey East Men's Ice Hockey Tournament in the semifinal round by crosstown rivals Boston College. They received a bid in the 2017 NCAA Division I Men's Ice Hockey Tournament, facing reigning champions North Dakota in the first round. Keller scored the game-winning goal in double overtime against North Dakota, and the Terriers advanced to the Frozen Four, where they lost 3–2 in overtime to Minnesota Duluth.

=== Professional ===
==== Arizona Coyotes (2017–2024) ====
Once Keller's freshman season at Boston University concluded, he signed a three-year, entry-level contract with the Coyotes on March 26, 2017. He made his NHL debut the next night, playing against the St. Louis Blues at his hometown stadium, the Scottrade Center. He skated on a line with Alexander Burmistrov and Christian Fischer in the game, which the Coyotes lost 4–1. Keller recorded his first point in his first home game at Gila River Arena, assisting on Alex Goligoski's third-period goal against the Blues. It was the only goal the Coyotes scored in the 3–1 loss. He played in only three games at the end of the 2016–17 season, recording two assists in the process.

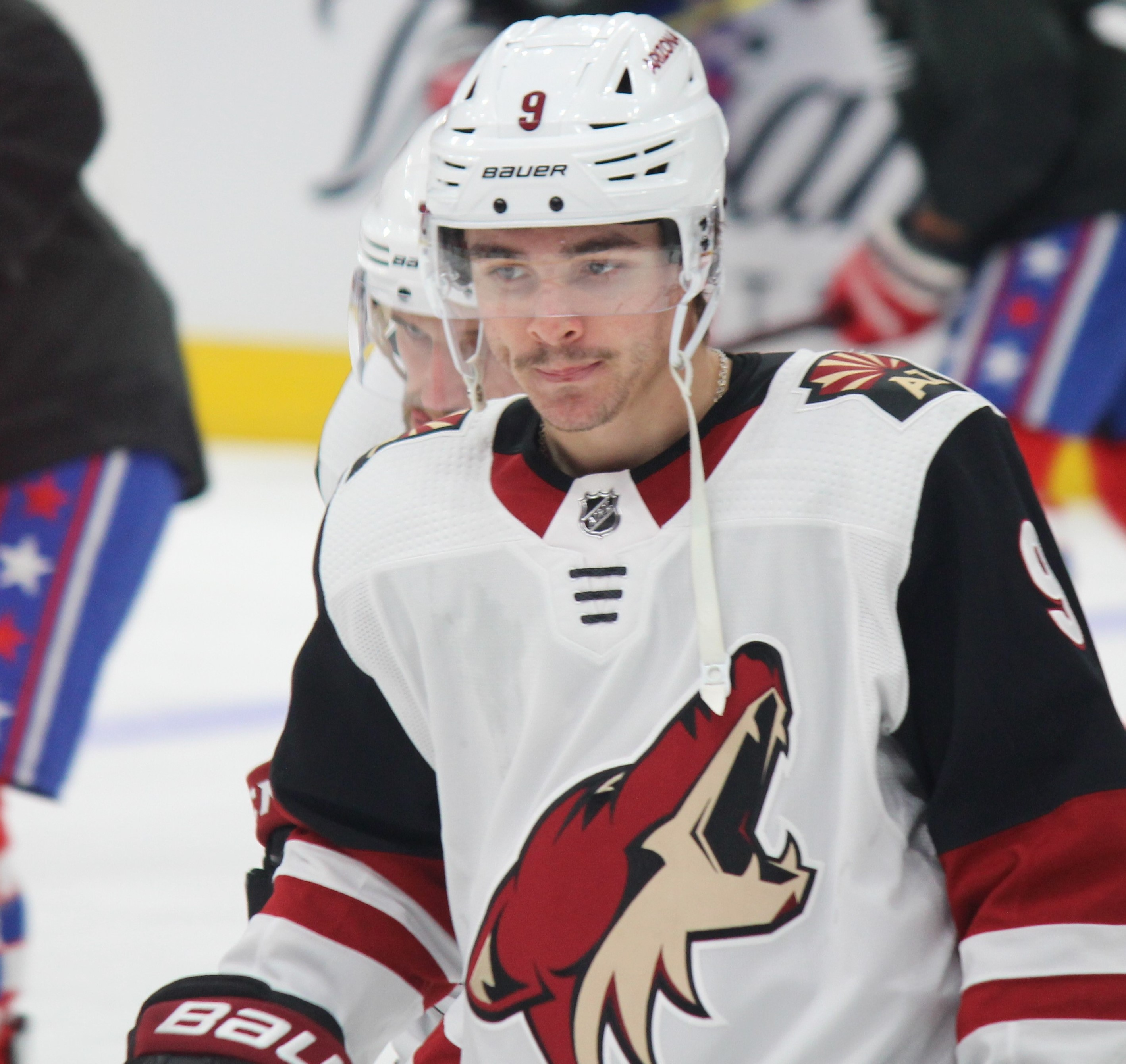
Keller with the Arizona Coyotes in November 2019

After impressing new coach Rick Tocchet in training camp, Keller started the 2017–18 season as the right winger on the Coyotes' top offensive line. He scored his first NHL goal in the season opener against the Anaheim Ducks, a game which the Coyotes won 5–4. Although the Coyotes began the season with the worst record in the NHL, going 1–11–1 in the month of October, Keller led all rookies with nine goals and 15 points in that same period, and he was named the NHL Rookie of the Month for doing so. His nine goals were the most of any franchise rookie since Teemu Selanne in March 1993, and his 15 points were the most since Selanne and Keith Tkachuk that same month. After October, however, Keller fell into a 17-game scoring drought from November 6 to December 14. It was broken when he scored on Andrei Vasilevskiy of the Tampa Bay Lightning. His slump continued into January and February 2018, when he recorded only three goals and 12 points. With one goal and three assists on February 15, Keller joined Martin Hanzal and Kyle Turris as the only Coyotes rookies to record a four-point game. On March 21, Keller recorded two assists in the Coyotes' 4–1 win over the Buffalo Sabres, giving him 55 points and 35 assists for the season. Those marks passed Peter Mueller and Max Domi, respectively, for the most of any franchise rookie since the Coyotes relocated from Winnipeg prior to the 1996–97 season. Keller was named the NHL Rookie of the Month again for March 2018 after finishing the month with 23 goals, 40 assists, and 63 points on the season, all franchise records for a rookie. He finished the season with a team-leading 23 goals and 65 points and tied Derek Stepan with 42 assists. At the Coyotes' end-of-season banquet, he received the Team MVP Award, the Leading Scorer Award, and the Three Star Award. Keller finished third in voting for the 2018 Calder Memorial Trophy, given to the top NHL rookie, behind winner Mathew Barzal and runner-up Brock Boeser.

Keller centered the Coyotes' second line in the first three games of the 2018–19 season before he was promoted back to the top line wing with Stepan and Richard Pánik. At the end of November, the Coyotes acquired Nick Schmaltz from the Chicago Blackhawks, allowing him to center the top line with Keller and Alex Galchenyuk, a line that showed immediate success. By January 2, Keller led the Coyotes with 29 points in 39 games, including a team-leading 21 assists, four game-winning goals, and 13 power play points, and his 96 career points were the most of any Coyotes skater before turning 21. He received his first NHL All-Star Game selection in 2019 as the representative for his team. On January 19, Keller recorded his 100th career point with a goal in Arizona's 3–2 overtime loss to the Pittsburgh Penguins. He reached the milestone in his 132nd NHL game, breaking Max Domi's franchise record of 154 games to 100 points. Keller and Galchenyuk's performance suffered after Schmaltz suffered a season-ending knee injury, but the pair showed some improvement in February after they were partnered with Nick Cousins. For the second year in a row, Keller played in all 82 games of the NHL regular season. finishing his sophomore season with 14 goals and a team-leading 47 points.

On September 4, 2019, the Coyotes signed Keller to an eight-year, $57.2 million contract extension carrying an average annual value (AAV) of $7.15 million. He moved to left wing for the start of the 2019–20 season, with Stepan centering and newcomer Phil Kessel on the right wing. While facing the Detroit Red Wings on December 22, Keller scored twice and assisted once in the Coyotes' 5–2 victory, becoming the first player in franchise history to record four three-point games before his 22nd birthday. By the end of 2019, his 29 points (10 goals and 19 assists) in 40 games were second on the team, and although Darcy Kuemper was the Coyotes' representative at the 2020 NHL All-Star Game, Keller appeared on the Last Man In ballot, which allowed fans to vote him into one of the final spots of the tournament. The Last Man In for the Central Division that season was ultimately David Perron of the St. Louis Blues. By the time that the COVID-19 pandemic suspended the NHL season in mid-March, Keller had 17 goals and 44 points in 70 games. As part of the league's Return to Play protocols, the Coyotes reached the 2020 Stanley Cup playoffs, facing the Nashville Predators in the qualifying round, and Keller was one of 31 players invited to the playoff quarantine bubble in Edmonton. One of eight Coyotes making his postseason debut in 2020, Keller led his team in scoring with four goals and seven points in nine playoff games before the Colorado Avalanche eliminated Arizona in the second tournament round.

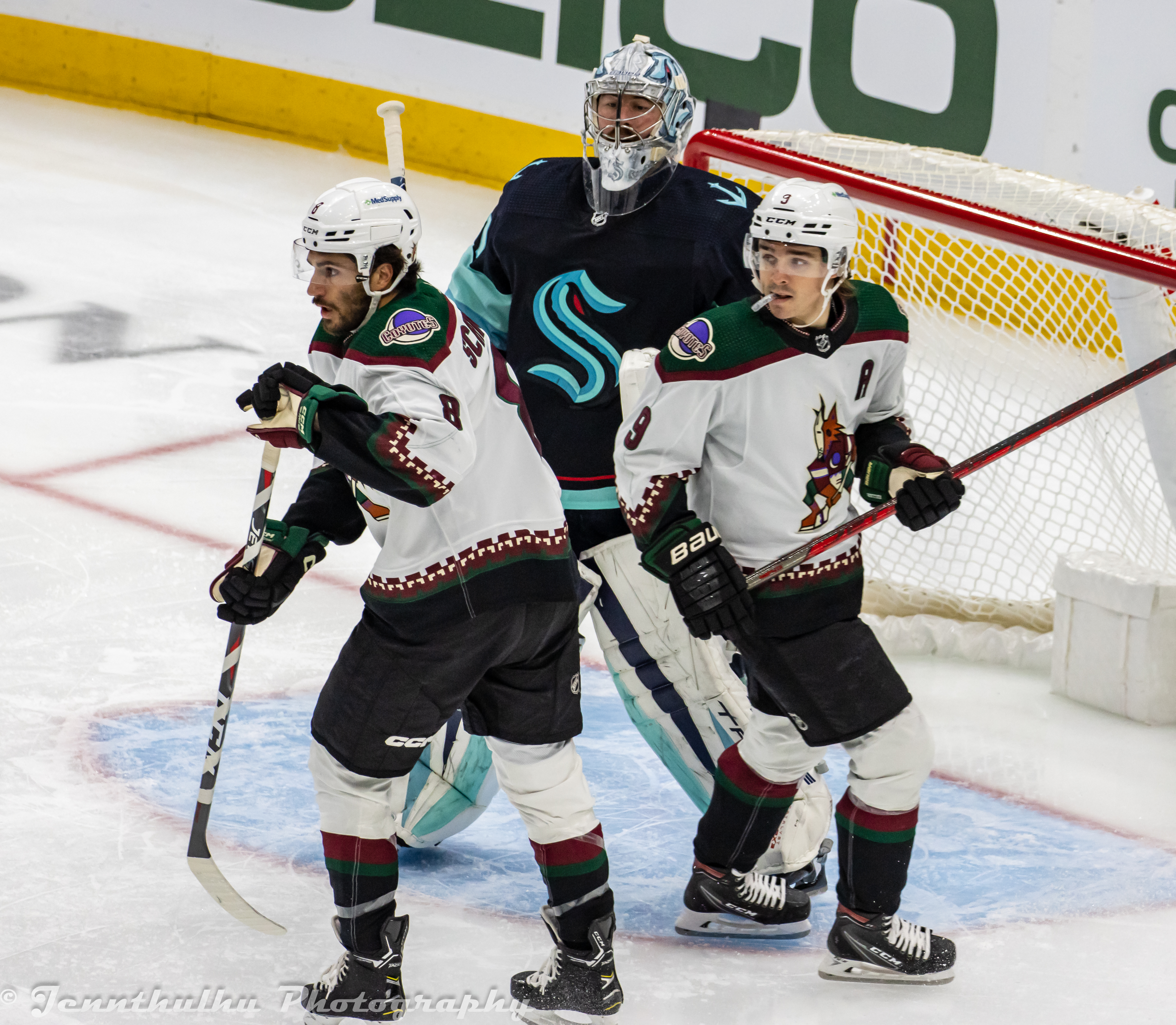
Nick Schmaltz (left) and Keller against the Seattle Kraken in 2023

Keller dropped to the Coyotes' third line for the beginning of the 2020–21 season, playing on newcomer Derick Brassard's left wing with Tyler Pitlick on the right. Facing the Blues on February 9, Keller scored the game-tying goal with 0.7 seconds left in regulation, forcing overtime. The Coyotes won the game 4–3 with shootout goals from Conor Garland and Christian Dvorak. At the start of February, Tocchet placed Keller on a line with Schmaltz and Garland, which he nicknamed the "Short Leash Line" for their high offensive output but poor defense. In the seven consecutive games in which the Coyotes faced the Blues, the Short Leash Line combined for 21 points, with Keller registering three goals and three assists. Playing in all 56 games of the COVID-shortened 2020–21 season, Keller recorded 14 goals and 35 points. He was one of 11 players the Coyotes chose to protect from being taken by the Seattle Kraken in the 2021 NHL expansion draft that July.

At the request of his coaches, Keller gained weight during the 2021 off-season, and he entered the 2021–22 season with a greater physicality and defensive presence. Through his first 24 games, he had six goals, 16 points, 18 penalty minutes, and 15 blocked shots. Included in those 16 points was the 200th of Keller's career, which occurred on November 19 with a third-period assist against the Columbus Blue Jackets. Keller reached the milestone in his 310th career game, becoming the 11th Coyote to register 200 points and the fifth member of the 2016 NHL Draft class to do so. Keller received his second NHL All-Star Game selection in 2022, leading his team with 12 goals and 26 points through 34 games, including two game-winning goals and two overtime goals. Following an injury to Jay Beagle, Keller also became an alternate captain for the Coyotes partway through the 2021–22 season. On March 30, 2022, Keller crashed into the boards during a game against the San Jose Sharks and was taken off the ice on a stretcher. He announced later that he would miss the remainder of the season with a leg injury. At the time of the injury, the Coyotes had been mathematically eliminated from playoff contention, but Keller had a team-leading 63 points, including a career-high 28 goals, in 67 games.

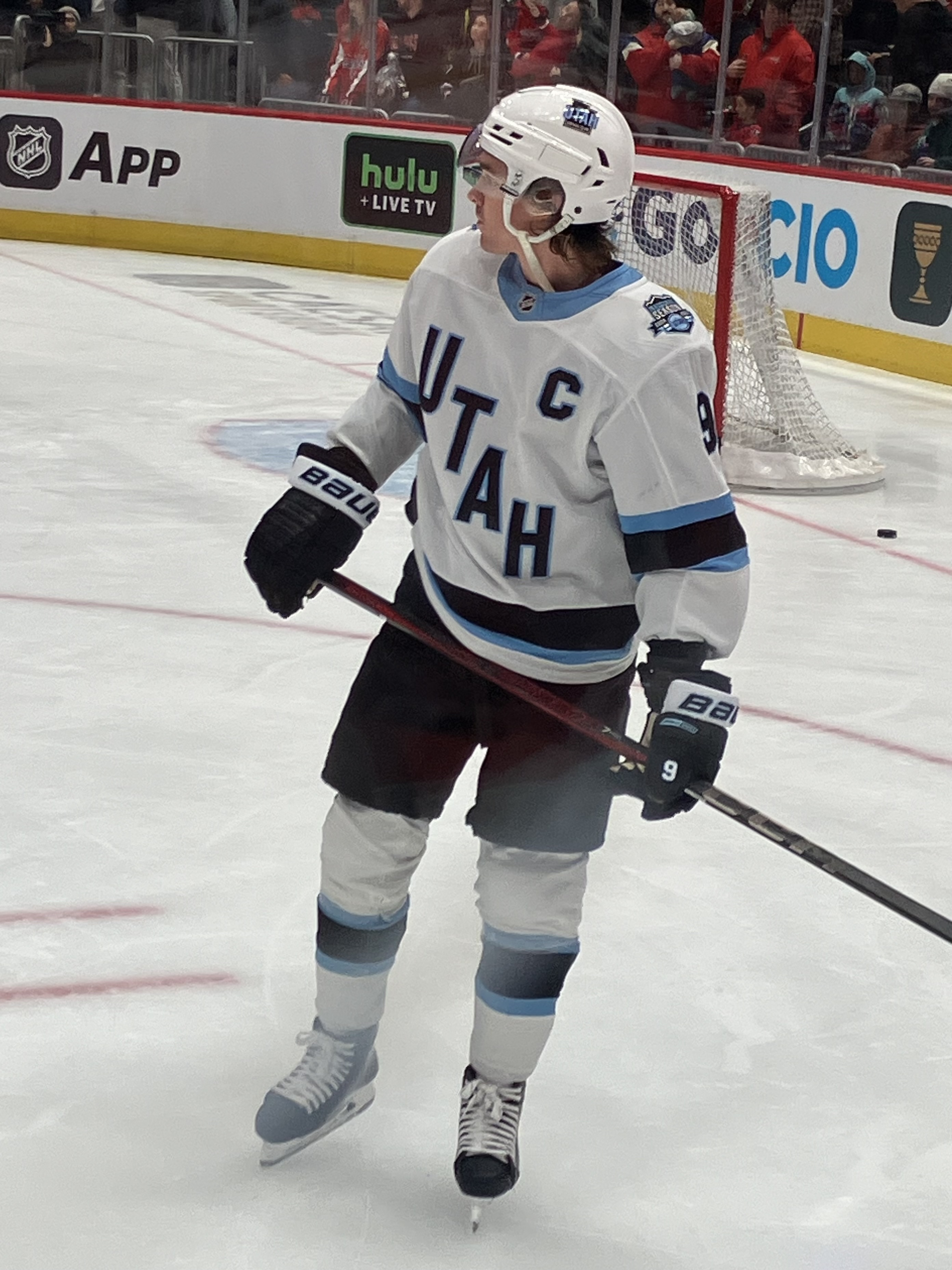
Keller as the captain of Utah in 2025

Keller returned for the 2022–23 season following six months of rehabilitation, and was able to play a full 82-game season. With 86 points, he tied the Coyotes record since their relocation to Arizona, and his 37 goals were the third-most in the same span. He was his team's representative in the 2023 All-Star Game, and was named a finalist for the Bill Masterton Memorial Trophy, awarded to "the NHL player voted to best exemplify the qualities of perseverance, sportsmanship, and dedication to hockey."

During the 2023–24 season, while leading the Coyotes in scoring (31 points) through 36 games, Keller was selected to participate in the 2024 All-Star Game, making it his third consecutive and fourth career All-Star Game. His fourth selection to the All-Star Game made him the only player in Coyotes history to be selected to more than three such games.

==== Utah Mammoth (2024–present) ====
Shortly after the end of the 2023–24 regular season, the Coyotes' franchise was suspended and its hockey assets were subsequently transferred to the expansion Utah Mammoth; as a result, Keller became a member of the Utah team. On October 4, 2024, Keller was named as the first captain in franchise history.

== International play ==
Medal record

Men's ice hockey

Representing the United States

Winter Olympics
Gold medal – first place	2026 Milano Cortina	

World Championships
Gold medal – first place	2025 Sweden/Denmark	

World Junior Championships
Gold medal – first place	2017 Canada	

World U18 Championship
Gold medal – first place	2015 Switzerland	
Bronze medal – third place	2016 United States	

World U-17 Hockey Challenge
Silver medal – second place	2014 Ontario	

Keller first represented the United States internationally at the 2014 World U-17 Hockey Challenge. He led the tournament in scoring with 13 points in six games, but the United States finished in second place, losing 2–1 to Russia in the championship game. He won a gold medal the following year at the 2015 World U18 Championships, with four goals and 11 points in eight games. Although the United States only took bronze at the 2016 World U18 Championships, Keller had four goals and 14 points in seven games, and he was named tournament's most valuable player (MVP) and a member of the Media All-Star Team.

Keller was selected to the United States junior team for the 2017 World Junior Championships, scoring two goals in the opening-day 6–1 rout of Latvia. He faced his Arizona teammate Dylan Strome in the gold medal game against Canada, which the United States won 5–4. Keller finished the tournament with a three goals and a team-leading 11 points. Canadian Thomas Chabot was named the tournament MVP, but Keller was named to the All-Star Team.

Three Coyotes played for the United States senior team at the 2017 World Championship, including Keller. The youngest player in that year's tournament, Keller scored five goals in seven preliminary-round games, including a hat-trick in United States' 7–2 victory over Denmark. He finished the tournament with five goals and seven points in eight games as the United States lost 2–0 against Finland in the quarterfinals. He returned to play for the United States two years later at the 2019 World Championship, He recorded two goals and four points in eight games for the seventh-place United States team.

Keller represented the United States at the 2025 World Championship, where he recorded three goals and seven assists in 10 games and helped the United States team win their first gold medal since 1933.

On January 2, 2026, he was named to the United States' roster for the 2026 Winter Olympics. He played in only four games in the tournament and went scoreless; nevertheless, the United States won the gold medal. Amid online backlash faced by the men's Olympic hockey team regarding the inclusion of FBI director Kash Patel during their gold medal celebrations and members of the team laughing at President Trump's comments of being impeached if he did not invite the women's team to the White House, the team was invited to meet with the president and attend the State of the Union. Keller was among the majority who visited with the president, however, he did not attend the State of the Union.

== Personal life ==
Keller's younger brother Jake is a junior ice hockey player in the North American Hockey League. After playing with the Minnesota Magicians for the 2019–20 season and two years at Wayzata High School, he signed with the New Mexico Ice Wolves for the 2021–22 season.

== Career statistics ==
=== Regular season and playoffs ===
			Regular season					Playoffs
Season	Team	League	GP	G	A	Pts	PIM	GP	G	A	Pts	PIM
2014–15	US NTDP Juniors	USHL	34	14	23	37	10	—	—	—	—	—
2014–15	US NTDP U17	USDP	45	25	34	59	24	—	—	—	—	—
2014–15	US NTDP U18	USDP	16	9	14	23	4	—	—	—	—	—
2015–16	US NTDP Juniors	USHL	23	13	24	37	14	—	—	—	—	—
2015–16	US NTDP U18	USDP	62	37	70	107	40	—	—	—	—	—
2016–17	Boston University	HE	31	21	24	45	26	—	—	—	—	—
2016–17	Arizona Coyotes	NHL	3	0	2	2	0	—	—	—	—	—
2017–18	Arizona Coyotes	NHL	82	23	42	65	24	—	—	—	—	—
2018–19	Arizona Coyotes	NHL	82	14	33	47	24	—	—	—	—	—
2019–20	Arizona Coyotes	NHL	70	17	27	44	28	9	4	3	7	0
2020–21	Arizona Coyotes	NHL	56	14	21	35	18	—	—	—	—	—
2021–22	Arizona Coyotes	NHL	67	28	35	63	28	—	—	—	—	—
2022–23	Arizona Coyotes	NHL	82	37	49	86	49	—	—	—	—	—
2023–24	Arizona Coyotes	NHL	78	33	43	76	32	—	—	—	—	—
2024–25	Utah Hockey Club	NHL	81	30	60	90	28	—	—	—	—	—
2025–26	Utah Mammoth	NHL	82	26	62	88	38	6	1	4	5	0
NHL totals			683	222	374	596	269	15	5	7	12	0

=== International ===
Year	Team	Event	Result	GP	G	A	Pts	PIM
2014	United States	U17	2nd place, silver medalist(s)	6	6	7	13	4
2015	United States	WJC18	1st place, gold medalist(s)	7	4	5	9	0
2016	United States	WJC18	3rd place, bronze medalist(s)	7	4	10	14	2
2017	United States	WJC	1st place, gold medalist(s)	7	3	8	11	2
2017	United States	WC	5th	8	5	2	7	2
2019	United States	WC	7th	8	2	2	4	0
2025	United States	WC	1st place, gold medalist(s)	10	3	7	10	2
2026	United States	OG	1st place, gold medalist(s)	4	0	0	0	0
Junior totals				27	17	30	47	8
Senior totals				30	10	11	21	4

== Awards and honors ==
Award	Year	Ref
College
Tim Taylor Award	2017	
Hockey East Rookie of the Year	2017	
Hockey East Second All-Star Team	2017	
Hockey East All-Rookie Team	2017	
NHL
NHL All-Star Game	2019, 2022, 2023, 2024	
International
World U18 Championship Most Valuable Player	2016	
World U18 Championship All-Star Team	2016	
World Junior Championship All-Star Team	2017	

Awards and achievements
Preceded by Dylan Strome	Arizona Coyotes first-round draft pick 2016	Succeeded by Jakob Chychrun
Preceded by Colin White	Hockey East Rookie of the Year; 2016–17	Succeeded by Logan Hutsko
Preceded by Kevin Boyle	Hockey East Three-Stars Award; 2016–17; With: Anders Bjork, Tyler Kelleher	Succeeded by Adam Gaudette
Preceded by Kyle Connor	Tim Taylor Award; 2016–17	Succeeded by Scott Perunovich
Sporting positions
Preceded by Position created	Utah Hockey Club/Mammoth captain 2024–present	Incumbent
