= Hockey East Rookie of the Year =

Annual ice hockey award

- Sport: Ice hockey
- Awarded for: To the first-year player who has shown skill, ability and leadership beyond that expected of a player in his rookie year.

History
- First award: 1985
- Most recent: Roger McQueen (Providence)

The Hockey East Rookie of the Year is an annual award given out at the conclusion of the Hockey East regular season to the best player in the conference as voted by the coaches of each Hockey East team.

The Rookie of the Year was first awarded in 1985 and every year thereafter. The award has been shared four times, in 1985–86, 1988–89, 1991–92, and most recently in 2020–21. Four players have been both the Player and Rookie-of-the-Year in the same season (Brian Leetch, Paul Kariya, Jack Eichel, and Macklin Celebrini).

== Award winners ==
Year	Winner	Position	School	Ref
1984–85	Ken Hodge	Center	Boston College	
1985–86	Al Loring	Goaltender	Maine	
1985–86	Scott Young	Right Wing	Boston University	
1986–87	Brian Leetch	Defenceman	Boston College	
1987–88	Mario Thyer	Center	Maine	
1988–89	Rob Gaudreau	Right Wing	Providence	
1988–89	Scott Pellerin	Left Wing	Maine	
1989–90	Scott Cashman	Goaltender	Boston University	
1990–91	Jeff Levy	Goaltender	New Hampshire	
1991–92	Craig Darby	Center	Providence	
1991–92	Ian Moran	Defenceman	Boston College	
1992–93	Paul Kariya	Left Wing	Maine	
1993–94	Greg Bullock	Center	UMass Lowell	
1994–95	Mark Mowers	Center	New Hampshire	
1995–96	Marty Reasoner	Center	Boston College	
1996–97	Greg Koehler	Center	UMass Lowell	
1997–98	Brian Gionta	Right Wing	Boston College	
1998–99	Darren Haydar	Right Wing	New Hampshire	
1999–00	Rick DiPietro	Goaltender	Boston University	
2000–01	Chuck Kobasew	Right Wing	Boston College	
2001–02	Sean Collins	Center	New Hampshire	
2002–03	Jimmy Howard	Goaltender	Maine	
2003–04	Michel Léveillé	Center	Maine	

Year	Winner	Position	School	Ref
2004–05	Peter Vetri	Goaltender	UMass Lowell	
2005–06	Brandon Yip	Right Wing	Boston University	
2006–07	Teddy Purcell	Right Wing	Maine	
2007–08	Colin Wilson	Center	Boston University	
2008–09	Kieran Millan	Goaltender	Boston University	
2009–10	Stéphane Da Costa	Center	Merrimack	
2010–11	Charlie Coyle	Center	Boston University	
2011–12	Scott Wilson	Center	UMass Lowell	
2012–13	Jon Gillies	Goaltender	Providence	
2013–14	Mario Puskarich	Left Wing	Vermont	
2014–15	Jack Eichel	Center	Boston University	
2015–16	Colin White	Center	Boston College	
2016–17	Clayton Keller	Forward	Boston University	
2017–18	Logan Hutsko	Forward	Boston College	
2018–19	Joel Farabee	Left Wing	Boston University	
2019–20	Alex Newhook	Forward	Boston College	
2020–21	Josh Lopina	Forward	Massachusetts	
2020–21	Nikita Nesterenko	Forward	Boston College	
2021–22	Devon Levi	Goaltender	Northeastern	
2022–23	Lane Hutson	Defenceman	Boston University	
2023–24	Macklin Celebrini	Center	Boston University	
2024–25	Cole Hutson	Defenceman	Boston University	
2025–26	Roger McQueen	Center	Providence	

=== Winners by school ===
School	Winners
Boston University	13
Boston College	10
Maine	7
UMass Lowell	4
New Hampshire	4
Providence	4
Massachusetts	1
Merrimack	1
Northeastern	1
Vermont	1

=== Winners by position ===
Position	Winners
Center	17
Right Wing	7
Left Wing	4
Forward	5
Defenceman	4
Goaltender	9

== See also ==
- Hockey East Awards
