= Paul Kariya =

Canadian ice hockey player (born 1974)

- Hockey Hall of Fame, 2017
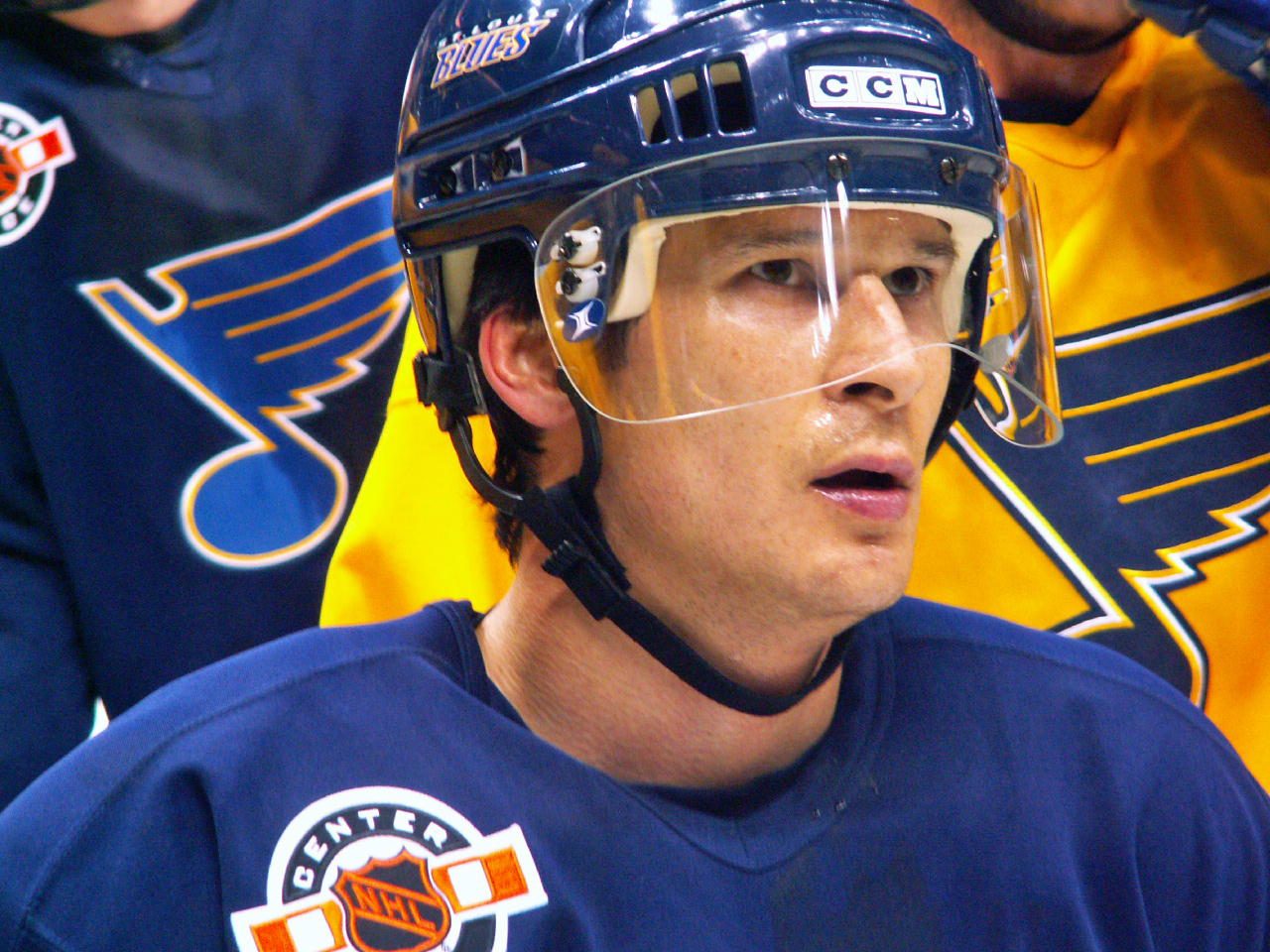
- Kariya with the St. Louis Blues in 2008
- Born: October 16, 1974 (age 52) North Vancouver, British Columbia, Canada
- Height: 5 ft 10 in (178 cm)
- Weight: 185 lb (84 kg; 13 st 3 lb)
- Position: Left wing
- Shot: Left
- Played for: Mighty Ducks of Anaheim; Colorado Avalanche; Nashville Predators; St. Louis Blues
- National team: Canada
- NHL draft: 4th overall, 1993; Mighty Ducks of Anaheim
- Playing career: 1994–2010
Medal record
Representing Canada
Men's ice hockey
Olympic Games
Gold medal – first place	2002 Salt Lake City
Silver medal – second place	1994 Lillehammer
World Championships
Gold medal – first place	1994 Italy
Silver medal – second place	1996 Austria
World Junior Championships
Gold medal – first place	1993 Sweden
Phoenix Cup
Silver medal – second place	1991 Japan

Paul Tetsuhiko Kariya (born October 16, 1974) is a Canadian former professional ice hockey player who was a winger for 15 seasons in the National Hockey League (NHL). Known as a speedy and intelligent offensive force with exceptional vision, he played in the NHL for the Mighty Ducks of Anaheim, Colorado Avalanche, Nashville Predators, and St. Louis Blues between 1995 and 2010.

After a two-year career with the Penticton Panthers, in which he was named Canadian Junior A Player of the Year in 1992, Kariya joined the University of Maine's Black Bears men's ice hockey team. In his freshman year, he received the Hobey Baker Award, while he and fellow Hobey Baker Award finalist Jim Montgomery teamed to lead the Black Bears to the 1993 NCAA title. Selected fourth overall in the 1993 NHL entry draft by the Mighty Ducks, he joined the team in 1995 and was named to the NHL All-Rookie Team. During his nine-year tenure with Anaheim, Kariya formed an effective duo with fellow winger Teemu Selänne that helped him to three NHL first All-Star team distinctions, while also finishing as the runner-up for the Hart Memorial Trophy in 1997. He won back-to-back Lady Byng trophies in 1996 and 1997 for his skillful play and exemplary sportsmanship. Serving as a captain for seven seasons, he led the Mighty Ducks to the 2003 Stanley Cup Finals, where they lost to the New Jersey Devils in seven games. After a single-season stint with the Avalanche, reuniting with Selänne, who had previously been traded away from Anaheim, Kariya signed with the Predators in August 2005. He played two seasons in Nashville, setting a team record for points scored in a single-season in 2005–06 (since broken). Kariya then finished his career playing three seasons with the Blues.

Internationally, Kariya represented Canada on numerous stages and at different levels. He won gold at the 1993 World Junior Championships, his second appearance at the tournament. He made his first appearance at the Winter Olympics in 1994 as an amateur, winning silver. Eight years later, he helped Canada win gold at the Winter Olympics in Salt Lake City. In between Olympic appearances, he won gold and silver at the 1994 and 1996 World Championships, respectively.

Throughout his NHL career, Kariya struggled with concussions, which eventually forced his retirement in June 2011 after sitting out the 2010–11 season because of post-concussion syndrome. In June 2017, Kariya was voted into the Hockey Hall of Fame. His number, 9, was retired by the Ducks on October 21, 2018.

== Early life and education ==
Kariya was born in Vancouver, British Columbia, to parents Sharon and Tetsuhiko (T.K.) Kariya. His father, a Japanese-Canadian born in a World War II internment camp at Greenwood, British Columbia, worked as a math teacher. Tetsuhiko died from a heart attack suffered on December 27, 2002. Kariya's mother, a Scottish-Canadian, was also a teacher. Coming from an athletic family, his father played rugby with the Canadian national team. Kariya is one of four siblings who play professional sports. Brothers Steve and Martin are also hockey players. His sister, Noriko, played hockey as well, before turning to boxing.

As a teenager, Kariya worked for a summer in construction. At age 16, he left home to play Junior A hockey in Penticton, British Columbia, where he also worked at a clothing store that belonged to the team's coach and general manager. Two years later, he enrolled at the University of Maine to join the school's hockey team and was a dean's list student.

== Playing career ==
=== Amateur ===
Kariya played two seasons of Junior A with the Penticton Panthers of the British Columbia Junior Hockey League (BCJHL), beginning in 1990–91. Recording 45 goals and 112 points over 54 games in his first season, he was awarded the Vern Dye and Bruce Allison Memorial Trophies as the Interior Conference's most valuable player (MVP) and rookie of the year, respectively. (Note: Both trophies are awarded to a player from each of the league's two conferences. Greg Hadden of the New Westminster Royals earned the Vern Dye Memorial Trophy for the Coastal Conference, while Jay McNeill of the Powell River Kings earned the Bruce Allison Memorial Trophy for the Coastal Conference.) The following season, he improved to 46 goals and 132 points over 40 games and was awarded the Vern Dye Memorial Trophy for a second consecutive year; (Note: Jay McNeill won the award for the Coastal Conference.) he was also further distinguished as the Canadian Junior A player of the year.

During his second BCJHL season, in November 1991, he verbally committed to joining the Maine Black Bears of the National Collegiate Athletic Association (NCAA)'s Hockey East conference for the 1992–93 campaign. Before deciding to join the University of Maine, Kariya also visited and received offers from Boston University and Harvard University for their respective programs, while entertaining offers from several other NCAA teams. He also turned down major junior teams from the Western Hockey League (WHL). His WHL rights originally belonged to the Victoria Cougars before they were traded to the Tri-City Americans in October 1991. (Note: Victoria sent Kariya's rights, along with defenceman Todd Harris, to Tri-City in exchange for wingers Fran DeFrenza and David Hebky, as well as defencemen Jeff Fancy and Jamie Burt.)

In his first year with the Black Bears, Kariya scored 100 points (25 goals and 75 assists) in 39 games. He was named Hockey East's Rookie and Player of the Year, becoming the second player to receive both awards in the same year after Brian Leetch did so with Boston College in 1987. Kariya also received Hockey East first All-Star team honours alongside teammates Jim Montgomery, Chris Imes and Mike Dunham. Nationally, Kariya was recognized with the Hobey Baker Award as the NCAA's top player, becoming the first freshman in history to earn the distinction. During the Black Bears' playoff run, head coach Shawn Walsh heralded him as one of the top three college players all-time. Kariya's efforts led Maine to a record of 42 wins, one loss and two ties, en route to the Lamoriello Trophy as the Hockey East's playoff champion and the NCAA title as the country's top college team.

A top prospect heading into the off-season, Kariya was projected to be selected between second and fifth overall in the 1993 NHL entry draft. Kariya went on to be chosen fourth overall by the Mighty Ducks of Anaheim, one of the NHL's two expansion teams. In addition to becoming Anaheim's first-ever draft pick, he also became the second-highest pick from Vancouver (after Barry Beck was chosen by the Colorado Rockies second overall in 1977). Following his draft, Kariya returned to the University of Maine for his sophomore year as team captain. He had been voted by his teammates for the role, along with defenceman Chris Imes. However, with Imes joining the United States' national team full-time in 1993–94, Kariya returned as the lone captain. Kariya was also committed to the Canadian national team in preparation for the 1994 Winter Olympics and left the Black Bears in December 1993. Following the Olympics, Kariya chose not to return to Maine, foregoing his remaining college hockey eligibility to turn professional with the Mighty Ducks. He finished the season with seven goals and 41 points over 23 games with the national team, as well as eight goals and 24 points over 12 games with Maine.

Five years after his tenure with the Black Bears, Kariya was inducted into the University of Maine Sports Hall of Fame in a ceremony on October 15, 1999. Two years later, in July 2001, Kariya's number 9 was retired by the Black Bears.

=== Mighty Ducks of Anaheim ===
==== 1994–98 ====
Upon returning from the 1994 Olympics, Kariya began contract negotiations with the Mighty Ducks in hopes of joining the team for the remainder of the 1993–94 NHL season. However, a deal failed to materialize and there was speculation in the media he would instead play in Europe. It was reported Kariya was seeking a US$12 million contract over five years from the Ducks. As both sides continued contract talks leading up to training camp for the 1994–95 season, Kariya agreed to a three-year, $6.5 million deal on August 31, 1994. The majority of the contract consisted of a signing bonus worth $4.775 million, while the annual base salary was valued at $575,000.

Garnering a great degree of attention from the Mighty Ducks' fanbase, Kariya's first public practice at Arrowhead Pond drew an attendance of 9,000, while 16,000 fans watched his first exhibition game. Due to the NHL lockout, resulting from a dispute between players and owners, his regular-season debut was delayed until January 1995 and the campaign was shortened to 48 games. During the suspension, Kariya participated in a charity tournament held in Hamilton, Ontario, sponsored by the National Hockey League Players' Association (NHLPA).

As NHL play resumed, Kariya made his debut against the Edmonton Oilers. He later scored his first career NHL goal on January 21, 1995, against Winnipeg Jets goaltender Tim Cheveldae. During his rookie season, he played on a line with Stéphan Lebeau and Shaun Van Allen. Early in the campaign, Kariya held the scoring lead amongst NHL rookies, but was later overtaken by Quebec Nordiques centre Peter Forsberg. Playing in 47 games, Kariya finished the season with a team-leading 18 goals and 39 points. Nominated for the Calder Memorial Trophy as the NHL's rookie of the year, Kariya lost the award to Forsberg. Despite being edged out, Kariya was named to the NHL All-Rookie Team. His play during his first NHL season earned him comparisons to Wayne Gretzky for his vision and Pavel Bure for his speed, while also earning accolades from Gretzky himself.

During Kariya's second season, he was chosen to play for the Western Conference in the 1996 All-Star Game, the only Ducks representative. At the time of his selection, in January 1996, he was ranked 14th in NHL scoring with 51 points (23 goals and 28 assists) over 42 games. He later replaced the injured Pavel Bure of the Vancouver Canucks on the West's starting lineup. (Note: The starting lineup consists of three forwards, two defencemen and a goalie per team and is decided by a fan vote.) Kariya scored a goal and an assist for the Western Conference in a 5–4 loss to the Eastern Conference. Less than a month after the All-Star Game, the Mighty Ducks acquired Finnish winger Teemu Selänne in a trade with the Winnipeg Jets, in a move that was designed to increase team offense. (Note: Selänne was acquired from the Jets in exchange for defenceman Oleg Tverdovsky and centre Chad Kilger.) Selänne was immediately placed on Kariya's line, and the two wingers formed one of the NHL's most high-scoring duos for several seasons. In the last month of the 1995–96 campaign, Kariya achieved the 100-point single-season mark with a goal and three assists in a 5–3 win against the San Jose Sharks on April 7, 1996. A week later, he scored his 50th goal of the season, scoring twice in the final game of the campaign, a 5–2 win over Winnipeg. With seven goals and seven assists over the final seven games of the season, Kariya was named NHL Player of the Month for April. He finished the season with 50 goals and 58 assists for 108 points, tying him with Selänne for seventh overall in NHL scoring. His three overtime goals set a team record. With 20 penalty minutes over 82 games, Kariya won the Lady Byng Memorial Trophy as the NHL's most gentlemanly player and was also named to the season-ending NHL first All-Star team.

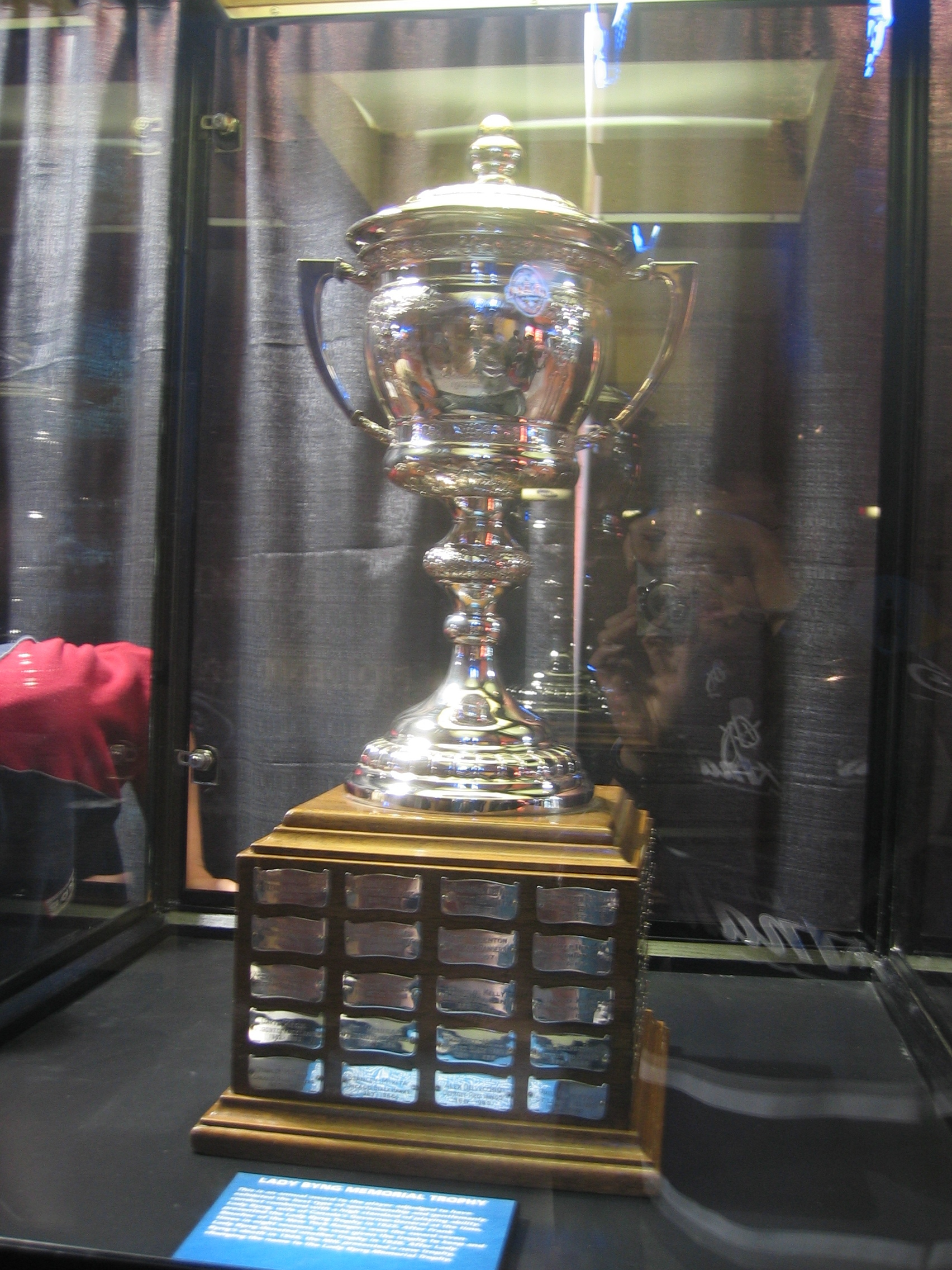
Kariya won the Lady Byng Memorial Trophy in 1996 and 1997.

Following the 1995–96 season, Ducks captain Randy Ladouceur retired. Kariya was chosen as the third captain in team history, following Ladouceur and Troy Loney. At age 21, he was the youngest active captain in the NHL and remained so until Bryan McCabe became captain of the New York Islanders two years later.

As the ensuing 1996–97 season began, Kariya was out of the lineup with a pulled abdominal muscle and missed the first 11 games of the season; he returned to the lineup at the end of October 1996. However, two weeks after his return, he was injured again after suffering a concussion during a game against the Toronto Maple Leafs on November 13, 1996, after opposing defenceman Mathieu Schneider hit Kariya in the head with his elbow. While the play was not penalized during the game, Schneider was suspended by the NHL following the game. Kariya missed two games as a result of the hit. Later in the season, Kariya was voted in by fans to the West's starting lineup in the 1997 All-Star Game. Joining him on the Western squad were Ducks teammates Selänne and Guy Hebert. During the game, he scored one goal in an 11–7 loss to the East. Returning to club play with the Ducks, he scored the fastest goal to start a game in team history, eight seconds into a match against the Colorado Avalanche on March 9, 1997. Kariya finished the season with 44 goals and 55 assists, one point short of reaching the 100-point mark for the second consecutive year. Limited to 69 games due to his injuries, he still ranked third in NHL point-scoring, behind Selänne and Pittsburgh Penguins Mario Lemieux. His +36 plus-minus rating and ten game-winning goals set Ducks records (the latter mark was tied by Selänne twice in 1997–98 and 2006–07, then broken by Corey Perry's 11 game-winning goals in 2010–11). Kariya finished as a runner-up to Buffalo Sabres goaltender Dominik Hašek for the Hart Memorial Trophy as the most valuable player in the NHL, and won the Lady Byng Memorial Trophy after recording six penalty minutes during the season. In so doing, he became the fourth player in NHL history to win the award in consecutive years after Stan Mikita (1967 and 1968), Mike Bossy (1983 and 1984) and Wayne Gretzky (1991 and 1992). He was also named to the NHL first All-Star team once more, an honour he shared with Selänne. Playing 11 games in his first NHL playoff season, Kariya had seven goals and 13 points, which ranked first in team scoring.

With his original NHL contract expiring in the off-season, Kariya and the Ducks struggled to agree on a new deal. As a result, Kariya sat out the first 32 games of the 1997–98 campaign. After making $2.1 million the previous season, he was reportedly asking for a three-year deal worth $27 million, while the Ducks countered with five-year, $25 million and seven-year, $49 million contracts. Both sides eventually agreed on a two-year, $14 million deal in December 1997. While the initial year of the contract paid Kariya a pro-rated salary of $5.5 million (it was also agreed in contract negotiations that Kariya would donate $2 million of his first year's salary to Orange County charities), the second year of the contract paid him $8.5 million, making him the second-highest-paid player in NHL history (behind Mario Lemieux's $11 million salary in 1996–97). During his absence from the Ducks, Kariya trained with the Canadian national team in preparation for the 1998 Winter Olympics in Nagano, Japan. Due to the contract impasse, he missed an opportunity to play in Japan, as the Mighty Ducks opened the season with a two-game series against the Vancouver Canucks in Tokyo, an effort on the NHL's part to attract attention to the sport ahead of the Olympics. In his first game back, he recorded two goals and two assists. During the second period of the contest, he took a team record seven shots on goal.

With several weeks remaining until the start of the Olympics, Kariya suffered another concussion after receiving a cross-check to the face from Chicago Blackhawks defenceman Gary Suter during a game on February 1, 1998. Kariya had scored a goal and was celebrating a goal at the side of the Blackhawks' net when Suter hit him. The NHL gave Suter a four-game suspension that carried through the Olympic tournament, but the IIHF allowed him to play, a decision that incensed Canadian officials and resulted in Suter receiving a death threat from an angry Canadian fan. There was wide speculation in the media that the incident was an intentional effort to keep Kariya from playing for Canada at the Olympics; Suter and teammate Chris Chelios were both members of the United States' national team. In the past, Suter was also accused of intentionally injuring Wayne Gretzky during a game between Canada and the United States in the 1991 Canada Cup. Canada general manager Bobby Clarke called the hit a "cheap shot" and publicly echoed the sentiment that Suter wanted to eliminate Kariya from Olympic play. While Kariya was initially expected to recover in time for the Olympics, the injury (his fourth concussion in three years) ultimately sidelined him from the competition, as well as the remaining three months of NHL play. Limited to 22 games in 1997–98, Kariya recorded 17 goals and 31 points.

Following Suter's return from suspension, NHL Senior Vice President Brian Burke was reported by Ducks head coach Pierre Pagé to have said he would have given Suter a longer ban if the extent of Kariya's injuries were immediately known. Later in the season, prior to a game between the Blackhawks and Maple Leafs in April 1998, Suter received a death threat, presumably for his actions against Kariya, forcing the NHL to position added security at the Blackhawks bench for the contest.

Suffering from post-concussion syndrome, Kariya experienced headaches and a loss of short-term memory. During his recovery, he was personally encouraged by fellow NHL players Eric Lindros and Pat LaFontaine, who were also dealing with serious concussions. He was not permitted by doctors to begin training until May 1998. Leading up to the 1998–99 season, Kariya told reporters he was ready to play a rougher style to protect himself from the opposition, including "getting [his] stick up" against oncoming players. He also adopted a helmet with increased protection, featuring extra padding and a tighter chin strap. In a similar effort, the Ducks additionally acquired enforcers Stu Grimson and Jim McKenzie during the off-season. During his recovery, Kariya was outspoken regarding the culture of the NHL regarding excessive physicality, as well as the lack of deterrence. In an article from the Sporting News, he commented, "There's too much of a lack of respect players have for one another ... If the league wants to stop that kind of conduct, it will have to punish players ... Ten-game suspensions ... and more, have to be brought back to help wake up players." He also added, "There probably isn't a player in the league who hasn't had a concussion."

==== 1998–2003 ====
Fully recovered for the start of the 1998–99 season, Kariya returned to NHL play in October 1998. During a 3–2 loss against the Detroit Red Wings in November 1998, he put a team-record 12 shots on goal. Kariya established several other Ducks records in the first half of the campaign, including a 17-game point-scoring streak on home ice that ended on January 15, 1999. He finished with the second 100-plus point season of his career with 39 goals and a personal best 62 assists. His assists total set a Ducks record that stood for ten years until Ryan Getzlaf recorded 66 in 2008–09. He ranked third in point-scoring among NHL scorers, behind Selänne and leader Jaromír Jágr of the Pittsburgh Penguins, while ranking first in the NHL with 429 shots on goal. Ranked sixth in the West, the Mighty Ducks drew the Red Wings in the opening round of the 1999 playoffs. In Game 3, Kariya blocked a shot with his skate, breaking his right foot. Unavailable for Game 4, the Ducks lost to the Red Wings and were eliminated. Before his injury, Kariya had a goal and four points over three games. Kariya's comeback season following injury was capped off with his third NHL first team All-Star distinction, receiving 47 of the possible 58 first-place votes for the left-wing position from the Professional Hockey Writers' Association. (Note: Philadelphia Flyers left-winger John LeClair received the remaining nine first-place votes and was named to the second All-Star team.) Kariya was also nominated for the League's Bill Masterton Trophy, awarded for perseverance, sportsmanship and dedication to hockey; he lost to Tampa Bay Lightning forward John Cullen, who attempted to return to the NHL after missing the previous season with non-Hodgkin lymphoma. While Selänne finished as second runner-up for the Lady Byng Trophy, Kariya finished sixth in voting.

Having played the final year of his contract, Kariya agreed on a new three-year deal with the Ducks, reported to be worth between $32 and $33 million, during the ensuing summer. The contract was signed on June 30, 1999, one day before he was set to become a restricted free agent. In the three seasons that ensued, Kariya's offensive production decreased, a period that coincided with the Mighty Ducks failing to qualify for the playoffs each year.

During the 1999–2000 season, Kariya's younger brother Steve Kariya began playing for the Vancouver Canucks. On December 8, 1999, the Ducks and Canucks met for a contest, marking the first time the brothers played against each other at any level. Steve recorded an assist on the Canucks' first goal of the game, before being called for a penalty. On the ensuing Ducks power play, Paul Kariya scored to tie the game at a final score of 2–2. Later in the season, Kariya was speared by San Jose Sharks defenceman Bryan Marchment during a game in March 2000. Kariya was not injured on the play, though Marchment received a three-game suspension from the NHL. Kariya finished the season with the third-highest goals total of his career with 42, though his points total dipped to 86. Nevertheless, he ranked fourth in NHL scoring, behind Jaromír Jágr, Pavel Bure, and Mark Recchi. In the NHL's season-ending awards, Kariya was named to the NHL second All-Star team, having been outvoted for left wing on the First Team by Red Wings forward Brendan Shanahan. (Note: While Kariya earned 23 first-place votes in comparison to Shanahan's 22, he finished with less overall voting points. Shanahan had 181 total points (including 21 second-place and eight third-place ballots) to Kariya's 167 (including 13 second-place and 13 third-place ballots).) He also ranked seventh in Lady Byng voting. (Note: one first-place, one second-place, seven third-place, five fourth-place and five fifth-place votes.)

During pre-season play in September 2000, Kariya received a one-game suspension after slashing Minnesota Wild player Aaron Gavey, though he was able to serve the suspension during exhibition play. Several months into the 2000–01 season, Kariya suffered a broken right foot after blocking a shot from Tampa Bay Lightning defenceman Pavel Kubina during a game in December 2000. Missing 15 games, he returned to the lineup in late-January 2001. The Ducks struggled as a team while both Kariya and Selänne's performances paled in comparison to previous years. In March 2001, Selänne was traded to the San Jose Sharks, marking the end of his duo with Kariya. Despite his and Kariya's success playing with each other, the Ducks had advanced to the second round of the playoffs just once in their tenure together. While disappointed with the trade, Kariya later commented that with the tandem constituting nearly half of the Ducks' $39 million payroll, "If [he] were running the business, [he] would have done something too." Kariya finished the season with 67 points (33 goals and 34 assists) over 66 games. In addition to losing Selänne via trade, Kariya played the majority of the season without centre Steve Rucchin, who was suffering from post-concussion syndrome.

Without Selänne for a full season in 2001–02, Kariya's points total continued to decrease. During the opening month of the campaign, he went ten consecutive games without a goal. Nevertheless, at mid-season, he was named to his sixth NHL All-Star Game in January 2002 (although it marked the first time he had been named to the All-Star Game without being voted in as a starter by fans). Kariya played on a line with Mario Lemieux and Joe Sakic (a trio that remained intact two weeks later for the 2002 Winter Olympics) and notched an assist in an 8–5 victory for the North American All-Stars. Shortly thereafter, Kariya played in his 500th career NHL game, against the Philadelphia Flyers, a contest in which he recorded a hat-trick to lead his team to a 5–4 win. Though he finished with a team-leading 57 points over 82 games, the 2001–02 season marked Kariya's worst statistical year as a Duck and the third-straight year his points total had decreased. The Ducks also suffered as a team, finishing with the third-worst record in the West. Losing fan support, the team drew the worst attendance in franchise history at home games during the season. During the season, he was often asked by reporters how long he was willing to remain with the Ducks while the franchise floundered. In the Canadian media, especially, there was a widespread position that Kariya should be moved to a better club.

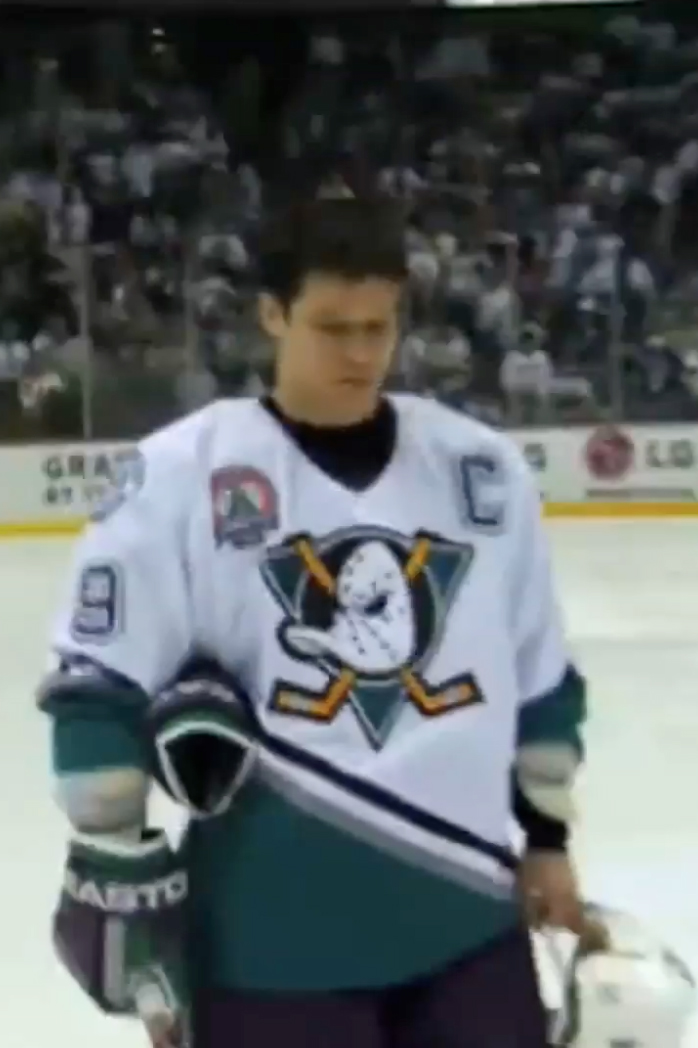
Kariya during the 2003 Stanley Cup Finals

==== Run to the Stanley Cup Final with the Mighty Ducks ====
During the off-season, Kariya became a restricted free agent before re-signing with the Ducks to a one-year, $10 million contract in July 2002. Before the signing, the Ducks made two key acquisitions, signing playmaking centre Adam Oates to a one-year deal and trading for winger Petr Sýkora from the New Jersey Devils. Both acquisitions were made with Kariya's input, as well as with the expectation they would play on a line with him. Although Oates was injured at the beginning of the season (during which time Kariya played with his usual centre, Rucchin), the trio formed the Ducks' top line. Despite playing under a defensive system implemented by new head coach Mike Babcock, the arrival of Kariya's new linemates coincided with a resurgence in offensive production for him in 2002–03. However, several months into the campaign, his father died of a heart attack. The Ducks gave Kariya the option to sit out the following game against the Vancouver Canucks, which he played nonetheless on December 28, 2002. He recorded an assist in a 7–3 loss. At mid-season, Kariya was selected as a reserve to his seventh and final NHL All-Star Game, held in February 2003. He scored the deciding shootout goal for the Western Conference, as his team beat the East 6–5. While his 25 goals marked the lowest total of his career since his 22-game 1997–98 season, his 56 assists approached a personal best. With 81 points over 82 games, he led the Ducks in scoring for the fifth time. His efforts helped the Mighty Ducks to the seventh seed in the West, marking the team's return to the playoffs for the first time in four years. Matching up against the second-seeded Red Wings in the first round, Kariya opened the playoffs with a triple-overtime winner in game one, resulting in a 2–1 Ducks win. Anaheim went on to sweep the Red Wings in four games; Kariya scored his second goal of the series in the deciding game, a 3–2 overtime win. It marked the second time in NHL history that a team eliminated the defending Stanley Cup champion in four straight games in the first round. The Mighty Ducks went on to eliminate the Dallas Stars and Minnesota Wild in the next two rounds to advance to the Stanley Cup Final for the first time in franchise history. During game six of the series against New Jersey, a game in which the Ducks faced elimination, Kariya received a hard open-ice hit from opposing defenceman Scott Stevens. Lying motionless on the ice for several minutes, he needed to be helped to the dressing room. Many felt Kariya's equipment changes following his first concussion may have saved him from being rendered unconscious from the Stevens hit. Four-and-a-half minutes of playing time later, he returned to the game. Following his return, he scored on a slapshot while skating down the wing to give the Ducks a 4–1 lead. Anaheim went on to win the game 5–2 to force a game seven; Kariya finished the game with a goal and two assists. Reactions regarding Stevens' hit were divided following the game. Kariya told reporters that after looking at replays that Stevens had used his elbow, while Ducks head coach Mike Babcock described it as a late hit. However, the play was not penalized during the game, and Stevens received no subsequent disciplinary measures from the NHL. Playing the deciding game seven in New Jersey, the Ducks lost the Stanley Cup by a 3–0 score. Over 21 games, Kariya finished third on the team in playoff scoring (behind Adam Oates and Petr Sýkora), scoring six goals and 12 points. Much of Anaheim's success was predicated on goaltender Jean-Sébastien Giguère's performance, who was awarded the Conn Smythe Trophy as playoff MVP. Kariya, meanwhile, was often singled out for his lack of consistent impact throughout the playoffs. As the highest-profile player on the Ducks, he drew matchups against opposing teams top defencemen during the post-season, such as Willie Mitchell against the Wild and Stevens against the Devils. He had also played part of the post-season with a separated shoulder.

Game seven of the Final marked Kariya's last game as a Mighty Duck. After nine seasons, he left Anaheim as the team's all-time leader in games played (606), goals (300), assists (369), points (669), short handed goals (16) and shots (2,455). His seven seasons as team captain also set a Ducks record. Kariya's records for games played, goals, assists, and points have since been surpassed by Selänne, who returned to the Ducks in 2005 and remained with the team until his retirement in 2014. Kariya's record for most seasons as the Ducks' captain has been surpassed by Ryan Getzlaf, who was the team's captain from 2010 until his retirement in 2022.

=== Colorado Avalanche ===
Following the Mighty Ducks' Stanley Cup run, Kariya became an unrestricted free agent in the off-season. With Kariya requiring a $10 million qualifying offer from Anaheim to remain with the team, general manager Bryan Murray let him go to free agency. Murray went on record saying, "We understand that he is an important player for the franchise... but when you are trying to build a team it's hard to have one player at $10 million when your payroll is the mid to low ($40 million range)." It was reported that the team had tried negotiating a longer-term deal with a decreased salary, while Murray told the media at the time he would remain in negotiations with Kariya to sign him for less. With former linemate Teemu Selänne also entering unrestricted free agency that summer after three years with San Jose (he decided to opt out of his final year, valued at $6.5 million), the duo agreed to reunite and sign with the same team. Together, they approached the Colorado Avalanche, having decided the team had the best chance of winning the Stanley Cup. On July 3, 2003, the Avalanche announced the signing of Kariya and Selänne to one-year contracts. For the team to afford both players, Kariya took an $8.8 million pay cut from his $10 million salary with Anaheim the previous year, marking the highest decrease in compensation for a player in NHL history. At $1.2 million, his salary was below the NHL average, ensuring he would have the freedom of unrestricted free agency at the end of the season. Selänne, meanwhile, signed for $5.8 million. Their deals were partially facilitated by goaltender Patrick Roy's retirement, which freed up $8.5 million in salary.

Kariya and Selänne joined an already high-powered Avalanche team that included such forwards as Joe Sakic, Peter Forsberg, Milan Hejduk, and Alex Tanguay. Despite high expectations for the duo's reunion, Kariya and Selänne both struggled in their sole years with Colorado. After beginning the 2003–04 season on a line with Selänne centred by Joe Sakic, Kariya suffered a sprained right wrist in a game against the Boston Bruins on October 21, 2003. After being sidelined for ten games, he returned in mid-November, but re-injured his wrist in his first contest back. Due to the injury, Kariya missed playing against the Ducks for the first time in a home game on November 18. Still recovering a month later, he remained sidelined for a return to Anaheim's Arrowhead Pond on December 20. Kariya's departure from the Ducks drew criticism from his previous team's fans. In anticipation of the Avalanche-Ducks game on December 20, Anaheim fans began a fund that raised over $1,200 to be given to the favourite charity of the Ducks player who scores the game-winning goal against Colorado. The idea was precipitated by reports that Kariya had given Selänne $3,000 for scoring the game-winning goal against the Ducks on November 18 (it is an informal tradition in the NHL for players to offer rewards to teammates who score against former teams). Kariya returned to the Avalanche lineup in time for their next game against the Ducks on January 13, 2004, at the Pepsi Center. He scored one goal in a 3–1 win. Later that month, he played his first game against the Ducks in Anaheim on January 30. Booed every time he touched the puck, and he recorded two assists, as the Avalanche lost 4–3 in overtime. Limited by injuries, Kariya scored below his career pace with 11 goals and 36 points over 51 games. Selänne recorded 32 points while playing in 78 games. In the final game of the regular season, Kariya injured his right ankle against the Nashville Predators on April 4. As a team, Colorado lost their division for the first time in nine years to the Vancouver Canucks. Qualifying for the 2004 playoffs as the fourth seed in the West, they lost in the second round to the Sharks. Kariya returned to the Colorado lineup in time for Game 6 against the Sharks, recording an assist as the Avalanche were eliminated by a score of 3–1.

=== Nashville Predators ===
Due to the NHL lockout, Kariya was professionally inactive for the 2004–05 season, using the time to recover from several nagging injuries. He incorrectly predicted that the dispute would last "a year-and-a-half [or] two years," as the players and owners agreed on a new collective agreement in July 2005. With NHL play set to resume for the 2005–06 season, Kariya became an unrestricted free agent in August 2005. Entertaining offers from ten different teams, Kariya signed a two-year, $9 million contract with the Nashville Predators on August 5, 2005, making him the highest-paid player in team history. Predators general manager David Poile heralded the acquisition as "unquestionably the biggest signing in [the] club's history". He ultimately chose the Predators for their style of play emphasizing skating and speed. Following the lockout, the NHL adopted several rule changes meant to benefit fast and skilled players such as Kariya. He was one of many NHL players who had publicly spoken out regarding the NHL's failed attempts in the past to reduce obstruction. During an earlier NHL-sponsored conference call with the media, Kariya criticized NHL rules, stating, "As an offensive player, I'm going through the neutral zone, and I have a player tugging me the whole way. If I don't go down, I'm not going to get a call because they are not going to make the call." Having come off the worst statistical season of his career in 2003–04, Kariya was admittedly looking to have a bounce-back season.

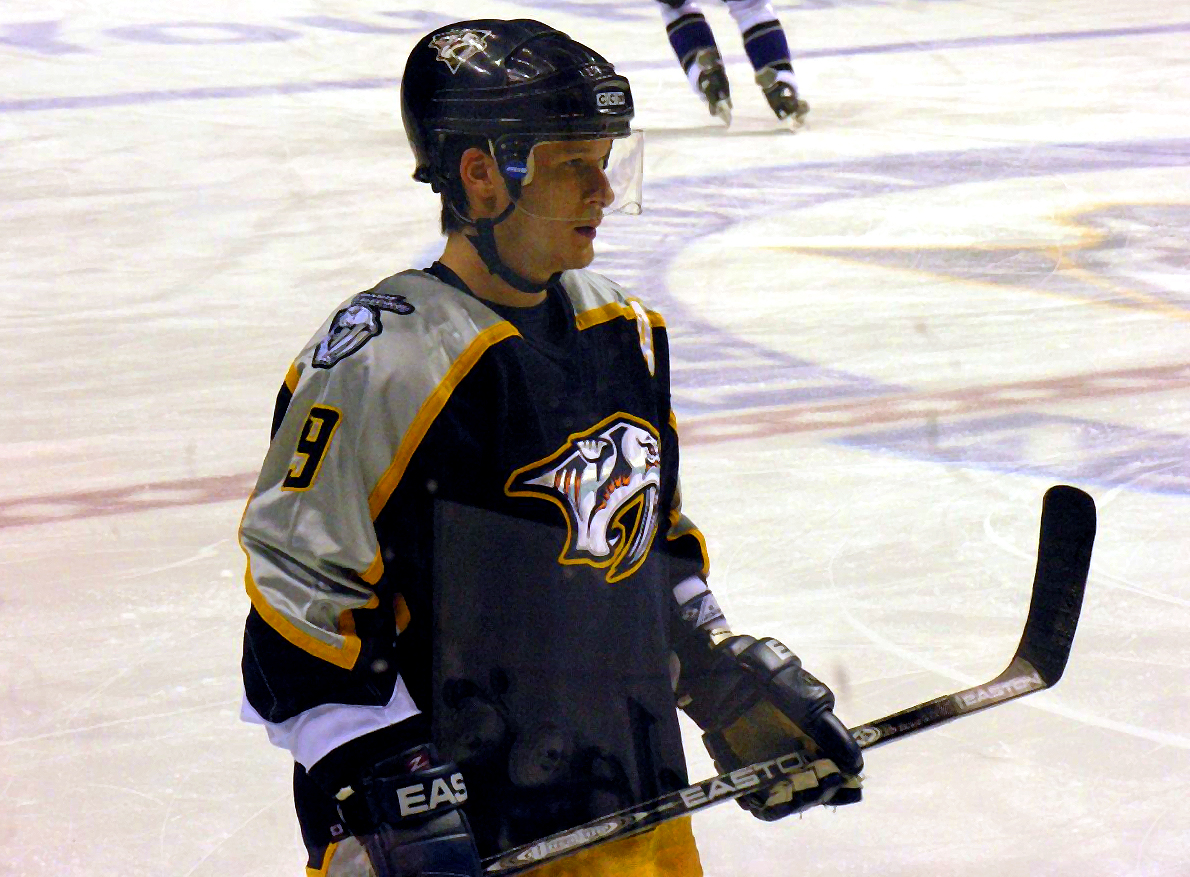
Kariya during his tenure with the Predators

During the Predators' training camp in September 2005, Kariya suffered separate ankle and groin injuries that limited his participation in team practices and pre-season games. Recovering in time for the season-opener, he debuted with the Predators on October 5, 2005, at home against the San Jose Sharks. Early in the game, Kariya was routinely cheered by fans when he touched the puck. Trailing 2–1 in the third period, he scored on goaltender Evgeni Nabokov to tie the game, en route to a 3–2 win. In his first season with Nashville, Kariya set team records with 31 goals, 54 assists and 85 points. (Note: Kariya co-set the record with Steve Sullivan that year, surpassing Cliff Ronning's 26 goals, achieved in 1999–2000. It was later surpassed by Jason Arnott's 33 goals in 2008–09. Kariya's 54 assists surpassed Ronning's 43 assists, achieved in 2000–01, while his 85 points surpassed Scott Walker's 67 points, achieved in 2003–04.) His 14 power play goals also tied defenceman Andy Delmore's team record set in 2002–03, while his 245 shots came within three of Cliff Ronning's mark set in 1998–99. In the playoffs, Kariya had two goals and seven points over five games.

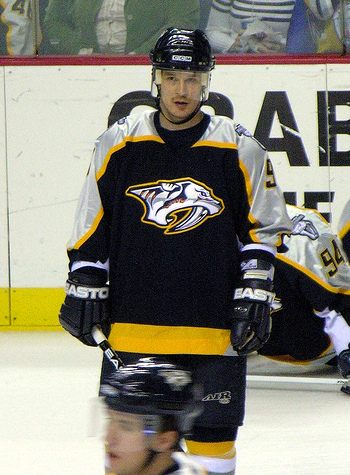
Kariya with the Predators in 2006

Kariya had 76 points (24 goals and 52 assists)—the second highest total in team history—over 82 games during the 2006–07 season and led the Predators in scoring for a second-straight year. Kariya had two assists during five playoff games. During the off-season, Predators owner Craig Leipold put the team up for sale; two of the leading candidates to buy the franchise both had plans to relocate the team. With Kariya's contract expiring, he chose not to re-sign with Nashville, citing the team's uncertain future.

=== St. Louis Blues ===
On July 1, 2007, Kariya signed a three-year contract worth $18 million with the St. Louis Blues. In a similar fashion to his signing with Nashville, his arrival in St. Louis marked one of the team's first notable free-agent acquisitions in a while (arguably since the team signed Brendan Shanahan in 1991). While the Predators were a team on the rise when he joined them, the Blues had contrastingly missed the playoffs in the previous two seasons.

Although Blues winger Jay McClement had the jersey number 9 upon Kariya's arrival in the off-season, he surrendered it so Kariya could retain his usual number. Assigned as an alternate captain for the team, Kariya rotated the position with Keith Tkachuk, and Barret Jackman throughout the 2008–09 season. Kariya debuted with the team on October 4, 2007, registering an assist in a 3–2 loss to the Phoenix Coyotes. After recording six assists in his first four games as a Blue, Kariya scored his first goal with St. Louis on October 17, 2007, in a 3–1 win against the Chicago Blackhawks. Two months later, Kariya recorded his tenth career NHL hat-trick against the Dallas Stars on December 29, scoring the Blues' final three goals, including the game-tying marker with ten seconds remaining in regulation. He was stopped in the shootout, however, by Mike Smith as the Stars won the game 5–4. With the hat trick, Kariya reached the 900-point mark in his NHL career. Despite a decrease in offensive production, Kariya tied winger Brad Boyes for the team lead in scoring with 65 points (16 goals and 49 assists) over 82 games. The Blues finished with the second-worst record in the Western Conference with 33 wins and 79 points.

A month into 2008–09 season, Kariya suffered a hip injury after being hit from behind in a game against the Anaheim Ducks on November 5, 2008, tearing muscle fibers near the top of his left thigh. The injury was initially undisclosed at the time and was erroneously reported as having resulted from a blocked shot. At the time of the injury, he had 15 points (2 goals and 13 assists) over 11 games, tying him for sixth in NHL scoring. After nearly two months of recovery, he began practicing with the Blues, but had a setback in late-December; a subsequent MRI exam revealed additional hip damage. Undergoing surgery for a torn acetabular labrum on January 5, 2009, the team listed him as sidelined indefinitely, while Blues president John Davidson told reporters he might be back late that season or the next. The following month, another MRI revealed a torn labrum in the opposite side of his hip, as well, requiring a second surgery. Despite the loss of Kariya, the Blues made the playoffs for the first time since 2004. With the Blues matching up against the Vancouver Canucks in the first round, Kariya began practicing with the team in hopes of a comeback for the playoffs. He told reporters he felt "stronger than [he had]… since 1999". The Blues were swept in four games however, before Kariya could return.

Fully recovered by the start of the 2009–10 season, Kariya made his return to the Blues lineup on October 2, 2009, a game played in Stockholm. He scored two goals in a 4–3 win against the Detroit Red Wings. On March 18, 2010, Kariya scored the 400th goal of his NHL career, against the New York Rangers. A week later, he recorded the 402nd and final goal of his career, in a 3–1 win against the Los Angeles Kings. Kariya played his last NHL game on April 11, 2010, against his former team, the Nashville Predators. With the Blues trailing by one goal in the third period, Kariya helped set up David Backes' game-tying goal, marking his 25th assist of the season and final point of his career. The Blues went on to lose the game 2–1 in a shootout.

On December 27, 2009, Kariya received the sixth and last concussion of his NHL career, an elbow to the head delivered from behind by Buffalo Sabres' forward Patrick Kaleta. During what would become Kariya's last season in the NHL, the League began expanding its efforts to eliminate hits to the head with new rules and stiffer penalties. NHL officials also began looking to penalize "blindside hits", defined as a body check against a player from the side, where he cannot see the ensuing player coming. At the time, Kariya called the pending rule changes "long overdue", adding, "[H]av[ing] been through so much with that… It's something that should've been in place years and years ago."

With his contract expiring in the off-season, Teemu Selänne, who had since returned to the Ducks, was reportedly in talks with team management to sign Kariya. However, on August 27, 2010, on the advice of doctors who refused to clear him to play, Kariya announced he would sit out the 2010–11 season with post-concussion syndrome. While the symptoms eventually did subside somewhat, the same doctors advised Kariya it was too risky to try to play again, and Kariya announced his retirement from hockey on June 29, 2011, through the NHLPA. He continued to be outspoken regarding the prevalence of concussions among hockey players; in an interview with the Globe and Mail, he commented, "The thing I worry about is that you'll get a guy who is playing with a concussion, and he gets hit, and he dies at centre ice."

== International career ==
In the summer of 1991, Kariya joined the Canadian Under-18 Selects Team at the Phoenix Cup, the inaugural tournament of what would go on to become the Ivan Hlinka Memorial Tournament. Kariya led all scorers with ten points in six games while being named to the Tournament All-Star team. Canada won the silver medal, losing out to the Soviet Union.

The following year, he moved up to the Canadian under-20 team for the 1992 World Junior Championships in Germany. The youngest player on the team, he recorded a goal and an assist over six games as Canada finished in sixth place. Playing in the tournament a second consecutive year in 1993, Kariya improved to two goals and eight points over seven games, ranking second in team scoring behind Martin Lapointe. Helping Canada to a record of six winsand one loss, they tied Sweden for first overall in the standings, but won the gold medal by way of their 5–4 win against them in their second game. The championship marked Kariya's first international gold medal and began a streak of five consecutive gold medals for Canada at the tournament. He was named to the Tournament All-Star team, alongside Canadian goaltender Manny Legace and defenceman Brent Tully. Nearly ten years later, TSN held a fan-voted poll on the Internet to select Canada's all-time World Junior team. The poll garnered more than 350,000 votes with Kariya chosen as one of 13 forwards on the team.

Four months later, in April 1993, Kariya debuted with the Canadian men's team in the IIHF World Championships, held in Germany. At 18 years and six months, he became the youngest player in Canadian history to play at the tournament. He scored nine points in eight games as Canada finished in fourth place.

Later that year, in December 1993, Kariya left his college team, the Maine Black Bears, to join the Canadian national team in preparation for the 1994 Winter Olympics in Lillehammer, Norway. At the start of the tournament, Canada was seeded seventh overall and was not considered a favourite to do well. Playing on a line with Chris Kontos and Petr Nedved, Kariya led his team in scoring with three goals and seven points over eight games, helping Canada to a silver medal. Tied with the Czech Republic 2–2 in the quarterfinal, Kariya scored the game-winning goal after 16 minutes of overtime play to help the Canadians advance. In the gold medal game, Kariya scored the first goal as Canada went on to lose 3–2 in a shootout to Sweden. With a chance to tie the shootout after Swedish forward Peter Forsberg scored, Swedish goaltender Tommy Salo stopped Kariya with a glove save.

Two months later, Kariya joined Team Canada for the 1994 Men's World Championships in Italy. He was the lone player on the team to have continued on from the Olympics, as well as the youngest, while playing on a line with Jason Arnott and Brendan Shanahan. During round-robin play, he scored a hat-trick against Austria in a 6–1 win. In the quarter-final, he added a goal and an assist in a win over the Czech Republic. Canada advanced to the final, where they defeated Finland 2–1 to capture the gold medal. It marked the first championship at the tournament for Canada in 33 years. Kariya finished the tournament with a team-high five goals and 12 points over eight games and received Best Forward and All-Star team honours on the latter, he was joined by Canadian goaltender Bill Ranford. With his success at the 1994 Winter Olympics and World Championships, Wayne Gretzky heralded Kariya as the next NHL superstar.

In January 1996, Kariya finished as a runner-up to Wayne Gretzky for the inaugural Jean Beliveau Award, an annual distinction from Hockey Canada for players who have demonstrated "outstanding playing ability and international experience while maintaining the fundamentals of sportsmanship and fair play". Unlike most annual awards, the distinction did not take into account players' performances in the prior year, but their contributions on a career basis. The initial three nominees were chosen by a selection committee, while the winner was determined by fan vote. Randy Gregg was the other nominee.

Following his second NHL season, Kariya was named to Canada's team for the 1996 World Championships in Vienna. During the round-robin, he scored a hat-trick against the United States, helping Canada to a 5–1 win, qualifying them for the quarter-finals. During their semi-final against Russia, Kariya scored in the shootout to help Canada to a 3–2 win. Advancing to the gold medal game, they lost 4–2 to the Czech Republic. Kariya finished the competition with four goals and seven points over eight games, earning him a spot as Canada's lone representative on the Tournament's first All-Star team. Over three World Championship appearances, Kariya recorded 28 points (11 goals and 17 assists) over 24 games, which at the time, ranked him at third all-time among Canadian scorers, behind Steve Yzerman's 39 points and Marcel Dionne's 32.

Before the World Championships, Canada also named Kariya to their team for the 1996 World Cup, which was held in August and September. However, Kariya was kept from competing due to a groin inflammation. During a news conference, he called his withdrawal the "biggest disappointment of [his] hockey career". The World Cup would have marked his first international appearance in a best-on-best tournament, as the competition did not interfere with the Stanley Cup playoffs as the World Championships did. Kariya was replaced in the lineup by New York Rangers winger Adam Graves. Canada went on to finish as runner-up to the United States in the tournament.

In June 1997, Kariya was again nominated for the Jean Beliveau Award, alongside Gregg, but lost to Bobby Orr.

Four years after his first Olympic appearance as an amateur, the 1998 Winter Olympics in Nagano, Japan, were set to become the first Games in which NHL players could compete in ice hockey. While Kariya was involved in a contract dispute with the Mighty Ducks, causing him to miss the start of the 1997–98 NHL season, Hockey Canada contacted Kariya, asking him to provide a training regimen by December 1, 1997, ensuring that he would be physically ready to play in the Olympics, given his inactivity in the NHL. Before agreeing to a contract with the Ducks in December, he joined the Canadian national team in training. On November 29, 1997, Canadian General Manager Bobby Clarke announced his roster for the Games, which included Kariya. He was the youngest player named to the team, behind defenceman Chris Pronger, who was born six days earlier. Less than a month to go before the start of the tournament, held in February 1998, however, he suffered a concussion, resulting from an on-ice crosscheck to the head from Chicago Blackhawks defenceman Gary Suter (see above). The hit received much publicity as Suter, a member of the United States' national team, was accused by many in the media, as well as Bobby Clarke, of targeting Kariya specifically in order to sideline him for the Olympics. Kariya was initially expected to recover in time but ending up did not play in the Olympics, nor the rest of the NHL season. Kariya again described the missed opportunity as the "biggest disappointment of [his] career," adding that he was looking forward to playing in Japan, having family there.

Leading up to the next Winter Olympics, Kariya was chosen as one of eight initial players to Canada's roster on March 23, 2001. (Note: The IIHF required each country to name a preliminary roster. The remaining fifteen players were announced in mid-December 2001.) Playing on the top line with Mario Lemieux, Kariya scored three goals and one assist over six games, tying for fourth in Canadian point-scoring. He registered his first goal of the tournament in Canada's second game, a 3–2 win against Germany. His second came against Belarus in the semi-final, qualifying Canada for the gold medal game. Playing the United States in the final, which included Gary Suter who had given Kariya the concussion before the 1998 Olympics, Kariya scored Canada's first goal of the game, tying the score at 1–1 in the first period. Canada went on to win 5–2, capturing their first Olympic gold medal since 1952. Canada's roster was later inducted into the Canadian Olympic Hall of Fame under the team category on March 26, 2009, during a ceremony in Vancouver.

Kariya was initially expected to help Team Canada defend their gold medal in 2006. However, he had come off the worst statistical season of his career before the national team's summer development camp in preparation for the 2006 Winter Olympics. His omission was singled out by the media; general manager Wayne Gretzky, who selected the camp's participants, explained publicly, "Paul is a great player, but at some point you have to have a cutoff," while also asserting he had spoken to Kariya personally regarding the situation. After a strong start to the 2005–06 NHL season, Kariya was one of 49 forwards chosen in October 2005 to Canada's preliminary list of players to be selected from for the final roster. When the team was announced in December 2005, however, he was not chosen.

During his career, Kariya became involved with Hockey Canada off the ice, as well. In the late 1990s, he joined the organization as a national spokesperson with women's team forward Jayna Hefford for the Initiation Program, promoting a safe and positive experience for children first becoming involved with hockey.

== Playing style ==
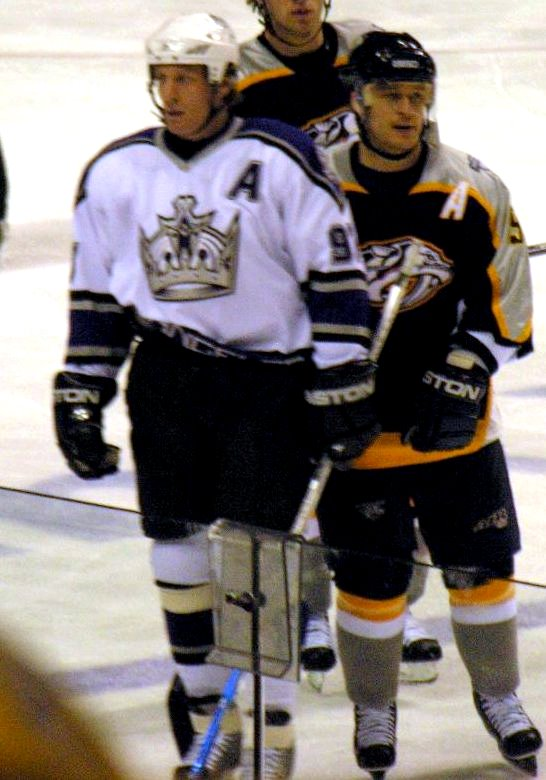
Kariya (right) stated that Jeremy Roenick (left) was one of the players he patterned his game after.

Kariya was known for his skilled and entertaining style of play. An offensive player, he was a fast skater with strong puck-handling and passing abilities. Before and early in his NHL career, Kariya drew comparisons to Wayne Gretzky. During the 1994 Winter Olympics, American Head Coach Tim Taylor likened his skating and playmaking ability to Gretzky's, while Kariya's linemate, Chris Kontos, described his on-ice vision as "Gretzky-like." Canadian head coach Tom Renney heralded him as "think[ing] and play[ing] at a better speed than anybody else," adding that his teammates "are usually a half-step behind him". His speed made him particularly adept in international competition, as games were played on a larger ice surface in comparison to the NHL. Following his first NHL goal against Winnipeg, Jets head coach John Paddock told reporters, "[L]ike with Gretzky the puck seems to following him around... It looks like he's cherry picking, but he's not. That's just great instinct." Kariya himself cited Gretzky, as well as Brett Hull, Jeremy Roenick and Pavel Bure, as players he liked patterning his game after. Kariya was also recognized for his "hockey sense" and the cerebral aspect of his game, which included analyzing the game at a high level. His first NHL coach, Ron Wilson, also once described Kariya as "the hardest-working athlete [he's] ever been associated with".

While recognized primarily as a playmaker leading up to his NHL career, Kariya was forced into shooting more as the Mighty Ducks lacked scorers in his first two seasons with the team. During his third NHL season, he commented, "If Teemu [Selänne] had been here right off the bat, then maybe I wouldn't have focused so much on shooting." Kariya was able to put many shots on goal due to his quick release. In 1998–99, he led the NHL with 429 shots on goal, which at the time was the second-highest recorded total in NHL history. Nonetheless, maintaining his passing ability, Kariya was particularly adept at making plays from deep in the offensive zone and beside the opposing team's net.

== Personal life ==
During his rookie NHL season, Kariya lived in the Anaheim area with a family that was close friends with Mighty Ducks head coach, Ron Wilson. Following his departure from the Ducks in 2003, he maintained a summer home in Orange County, California. With a background in competitive swimming as a child, he became an avid surfer in the area.

Kariya still resides in California with his longtime girlfriend, Valerie, near another former Ducks player, Scott Niedermayer. Kariya has maintained a close friendship with Teemu Selänne, and even attended Selänne's final regular season game at the Honda Center in 2014. Despite Kariya having only once attended the arena following his retirement, Selänne made sure to invite his old teammate as "he has meant so much to me, all my best years and the chemistry I’ve had with him." Selänne even went so far as to jokingly "threaten" to tie him up and toss him into the trunk of his car, then drive him to the stadium himself if Kariya refused. Paul Kariya was shown on the Jumbotron during the third period, which led to a loud ovation from the home crowd.

As captain of the Mighty Ducks, Kariya made a cameo appearance in Disney's D3: The Mighty Ducks movie, which was released in October 1996.

Kariya and Teemu Selänne were honoured by the Anaheim Ducks during a home game against the Florida Panthers shortly after Kariya and Selänne were inducted into the Hall of Fame. Players on the ice during warmups wore either Paul Kariya Mighty Ducks jerseys or Anaheim Ducks Selänne jerseys. Ducks team owner Henry Samueli brought up that Selänne's jersey retirement banner “looked lonely in the rafters” and told Kariya “they may have to do something about that in the future”.

The Anaheim Ducks retired his number on October 21, 2018, at a ceremony attended by Teemu Selänne and Scott Niedermayer.

In 2018, he was the subject of "Surfacing", a documentary feature on TSN. The segment's creators, Matt Dunn, Michael Farber, Brent Blanchard, and David Midgley, received a Canadian Screen Award nomination for Best Sports Feature Segment at the 7th Canadian Screen Awards.

== Career statistics ==
=== Regular season and playoffs ===
			Regular season					Playoffs
Season	Team	League	GP	G	A	Pts	PIM	GP	G	A	Pts	PIM
1990–91	Penticton Panthers	BCHL	54	46	66	112	8	—	—	—	—	—
1991–92	Penticton Panthers	BCHL	41	45	87	132	16	—	—	—	—	—
1992–93	Maine Black Bears	HE	39	25	75	100	12	—	—	—	—	—
1993–94	Maine Black Bears	HE	12	8	16	24	4	—	—	—	—	—
1994–95	Mighty Ducks of Anaheim	NHL	47	18	21	39	4	—	—	—	—	—
1995–96	Mighty Ducks of Anaheim	NHL	82	50	58	108	20	—	—	—	—	—
1996–97	Mighty Ducks of Anaheim	NHL	69	44	55	99	6	11	7	6	13	4
1997–98	Mighty Ducks of Anaheim	NHL	22	17	14	31	23	—	—	—	—	—
1998–99	Mighty Ducks of Anaheim	NHL	82	39	62	101	40	3	1	3	4	0
1999–00	Mighty Ducks of Anaheim	NHL	74	42	44	86	24	—	—	—	—	—
2000–01	Mighty Ducks of Anaheim	NHL	66	33	34	67	20	—	—	—	—	—
2001–02	Mighty Ducks of Anaheim	NHL	82	32	25	57	28	—	—	—	—	—
2002–03	Mighty Ducks of Anaheim	NHL	82	25	56	81	48	21	6	6	12	6
2003–04	Colorado Avalanche	NHL	51	11	25	36	22	1	0	1	1	0
2005–06	Nashville Predators	NHL	82	31	54	85	40	5	2	5	7	0
2006–07	Nashville Predators	NHL	82	24	52	76	36	5	0	2	2	2
2007–08	St. Louis Blues	NHL	82	16	49	65	50	—	—	—	—	—
2008–09	St. Louis Blues	NHL	11	2	13	15	2	—	—	—	—	—
2009–10	St. Louis Blues	NHL	75	18	25	43	36	—	—	—	—	—
NHL totals			989	402	587	989	399	46	16	23	39	12

=== International ===
Year	Team	Event	Result	GP	G	A	Pts	PIM
1991	Canada	PC	2nd place, silver medalist(s)	5	4	8	12	2
1992	Canada	WJC	6th	6	1	1	2	2
1993	Canada	WJC	1st place, gold medalist(s)	7	2	6	8	2
1993	Canada	WC	4th	8	2	7	9	0
1994	Canada	OG	2nd place, silver medalist(s)	8	3	4	7	2
1994	Canada	WC	1st place, gold medalist(s)	8	5	7	12	2
1996	Canada	WC	2nd place, silver medalist(s)	8	4	3	7	2
2002	Canada	OG	1st place, gold medalist(s)	6	3	1	4	0
Junior totals				18	7	15	22	6
Senior totals				38	17	22	39	6

== Awards and honours ==
Award	Year
BCHL (Interior Conference)
Bruce Allison Memorial Trophy (rookie of the year)	1991
Bob Fenton Trophy (most sportsmanlike player)	1991, 1992
Vern Dye Memorial Trophy (most valuable player)	1991, 1992
Canadian Junior A Player of the Year	1992
Hockey East
All-Hockey East Rookie Team	1993
First Team	1993
Rookie of the Year	1993
Player of the Year	1993
Lamoriello Trophy (league championship; with Maine Black Bears)	1993
NCAA
Hobey Baker Award	1993
National Champion (with Maine Black Bears)	1993
AHCA East First-Team All-American	1993
All-Tournament Team	1993
NHL
All-Rookie Team	1995
First All-Star team	1996, 1997, 1999
Second All-Star team	2000, 2003
Lady Byng Memorial Trophy	1996, 1997
NHL All-Star Game	1996, 1997, 1999, 2000, 2001, 2002, 2003
Skills Competition Puck Control Champion	1999, 2000, 2001, 2002
Anaheim Ducks #9 jersey retired	2018
International
World Junior Championship All-Star team	1993
World Championship All-Star team	1994, 1996
Hockey Hall of Fame	2017

== Records ==
- Last NCAA Division I player to score 100 points in a single season - 12th overall
- Anaheim Ducks record; most overtime goals, single season – 3 in 1995–96
- Anaheim Ducks record; highest plus-minus, single season – +36 in 1996–97
- Anaheim Ducks record; most shots, single season – 429 in 1998–99
- Most Puck Control Relay wins at NHL SkillsCompetition – 1999, 2000, 2001, 2002

== Notes ==
Awards and achievements
Preceded by Scott Pellerin	Hockey East Player of the Year; 1992–93	Succeeded by Dwayne Roloson
Preceded by Craig Darby; Ian Moran	Hockey East Rookie of the Year; 1992–93	Succeeded by Greg Bullock
Preceded by Mike Boback	Hockey East Scoring Champion; 1992–93	Succeeded by Greg Bullock
Preceded by Denny Felsner	NCAA Ice Hockey Scoring Champion; 1992–93	Succeeded by Dean Fedorchuk, Tavis MacMillan
Preceded by Scott Pellerin	Winner of the Hobey Baker Award; 1992–93	Succeeded by Chris Marinucci
Preceded by Ron Francis	Winner of the Lady Byng Trophy; 1996, 1997	Succeeded by Ron Francis
Sporting positions
Preceded by None	Mighty Ducks of Anaheim first-round draft pick 1993	Succeeded by Oleg Tverdovsky
Preceded by Randy Ladouceur	Mighty Ducks of Anaheim captain 1996–2003; Teemu Selanne, 1998 (note)	Succeeded by Steve Rucchin
