= Wolf Branch School District 113 =

School district in Illinois, United States

Address
- 410 Huntwood Road Swansea, Illinois, 62226; United States

District information
- Type: Public
- Grades: PreK–8
- Established: August 3, 1863; 163 years ago
- President: Douglas Gray
- Vice-president: David Parker
- Superintendent: Dr. Nicole Sanderson
- Schools: 2
- NCES District ID: 1742960

Students and staff
- Students: 2,149
- Teachers: 57
- Staff: 96
- Student–teacher ratio: 17:1
- Athletic conference: Belle-Fair Conference
- District mascot: Wolverine
- Colors: Blue, white, grey

Other information
- Website: www.wbsd113.org

The Wolf Branch School District 113 in Swansea, Illinois, consists of one middle and one elementary school. The elementary school is for grades pre-school to grade four. The middle school is for grades five through eight. The principals for the elementary and middle schools are Mrs. Jennifer Poirot and Mrs. Jamie Cox, respectively. The middle school assistant principal is Mr. Joshua Johnson and the superintendent is Dr. Nicole Sanderson.

== History ==
It is generally believed that Wolf Branch derived its name from the encounters locals had with wolves that were known to frequent this area. However, how much of a hazard wolves were to the local community back in the 1860s is not clear. Wolves were known to prowl about the creek (referred to then as a branch) and woods, thus providing the site with the name Wolf Branch.

The first Wolf Branch schoolhouse consisted of a one-room log structure set on one acre of land that had been deeded to the school on August 3, 1863, by Adam and Eva Bagley. The school was built along what is today known as Illinois Route 159. It is believed that the log structure was used for a short time before it was replaced by a one-room brick building. The bricks were made by hand in Mr. Bagley’s brickyard. In 1921, a new brick structure replaced the first brick schoolhouse and served as Wolf Branch School until 1957. The students moved from the brick schoolhouse to the newly constructed, multi-room school currently located on Huntwood Road. Several additions have been made to the one-room structure, which later served as a cabinet shop and residence.

Student life in the late 1800s and early 1900s was quite unlike student life today. The area around Wolf Branch School was primarily a farming community and children were expected, if not needed, to help out around the family farm. In keeping with that need, classes usually started after the harvest in late fall and let out in early spring in time for planting season. It was not uncommon for students to remain at school through age 19.

There were no yellow school buses back then. Most children walked – some quite a few miles. Back then, the school was located atop a hill in the midst of farmland accessible only by remote, unpaved farm roads through the fields. It was not until 1920 that a paved road in front of the one-room brick schoolhouse running from Route 159 to Smelting Works Road was constructed. A few years later, Huntwood Road was paved to connect Route 159 to Old Caseyville Road, providing the school district with a good hard surface, east-west road. In 2007, Huntwood Road was extended beyond Old Caseyville to connect with Sullivan Drive.

Wolf Branch Elementary School downsized somewhat in 2003 from a K-8 school to a K-5 school plus the addition of a pre-kindergarten program funded by the parents of participating Pre-K students. Wolf Branch Middle School opened its doors in August 2003 to a student body of 317 in grades six through eight. Located at 410 Huntwood Road, just ¼ mile from Wolf Branch Elementary School, the middle school featured 30 classrooms and a gymnasium that connected to a multipurpose room and cafeteria. The school also boasted two large computer labs, three science labs, a multi-media center, separate band, and chorus rooms, and an art center. Set back from the road, Wolf Branch Middle school further provided for the well-being of its students with large athletic fields, an all-weather running track, and a playground.

In 2009, two major construction projects impacted the school district. First, Huntwood Road was improved with a center turn lane, curbs, gutters, and sidewalks. Also, Wolf Branch Elementary School underwent a Health/Life Safety renovation to upgrade its entryway, administrative and support service offices, kitchen, gymnasium, bathrooms, and security system.

Shortly after the start of the 2017-2018 school year, the Wolf Branch Middle School suffered significant mine subsidence resulting from a movement that occurred in the abandoned, underground mine. Engineers from the Illinois Department of Natural Resources - Surface Mining Division determined that the west half of the school had dropped anywhere from 8 inches to 28 inches and that the entire building was unsafe for occupancy. In a two-day turn-around, staff, as well as community volunteers, turned out to help, and all necessary equipment/supplies were quickly moved into the elementary school.

Following the district’s formal decision to rebuild the middle school, the Department of Natural Resources utilized a grant from the United States Department of the Interior to completely grout all of the mine voids that they determined were located approximately 200 feet below the school. The grant also allowed the district to demolish the gymnasium, multipurpose room, locker rooms, kitchen, and music rooms, as well as gut the library and office complex.

After many lengthy design discussions, and the announcement that the Illinois Capital Development Board would fund 43% of the project costs, reconstruction began in March 2020. However, the project was almost immediately brought to a stand-still when the Covid pandemic was declared later that same month. Even though the elementary building was forced to close like all schools throughout the state of Illinois and had to resort to remote learning, the construction at the middle school was deemed essential and has continued with an anticipated completion date of August 2021.

All of the demolished and gutted portions of the middle school have been replaced, and the entire building has been improved by utilizing energy-saving and environmental-friendly components, as well as state-of-the-art technology amenities. Beginning in August 2021, grades 5-8 will once again be housed at the middle school, while grades PreK-4 will remain at the elementary school.

== Notable alumni ==
- Clayton Keller, NHL player for Utah Mammoth
- Drew Millas, MLB player for Washington Nationals
