= Craig Darby =

American ice hockey player

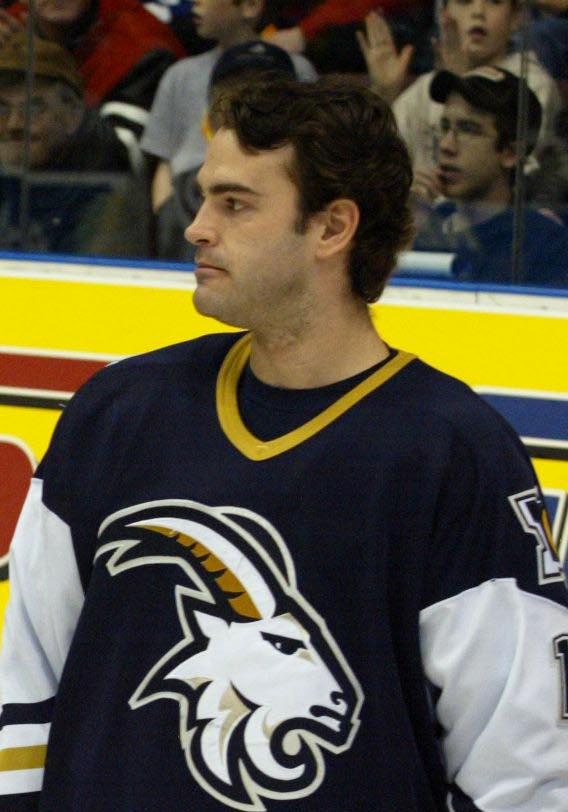
- Darby in 2002
- Born: September 26, 1972 (age 53) Oneida, New York, U.S.
- Height: 6 ft 1 in (185 cm)
- Weight: 195 lb (88 kg; 13 st 13 lb)
- Position: Center
- Shot: Right
- Played for: Montreal Canadiens; New York Islanders; Philadelphia Flyers; New Jersey Devils
- National team: United States
- NHL draft: 43rd overall, 1991; Montreal Canadiens
- Playing career: 1993–2008

Craig Allen Darby (born September 26, 1972) is an American former professional ice hockey center who played in the National Hockey League (NHL) with the Montreal Canadiens, New York Islanders, Philadelphia Flyers and New Jersey Devils.

== Playing career ==
Darby was drafted in the second round (43rd overall) of the 1991 NHL entry draft by the Montreal Canadiens. Darby entered into the NHL in 1994, following a successful time playing with Providence College in the NCAA and a season with the Fredericton Canadiens of the AHL, playing 10 games and registering two assists. That same season Darby was traded to the New York Islanders in a package along with Kirk Muller and Mathieu Schneider in exchange for Pierre Turgeon and Vladimir Malakhov, playing three more games in the 1994–95 season. On June 4, 1996, Darby was claimed off waivers by the Philadelphia Flyers after he spent most of the 1995–96 season in the AHL with the Worcester IceCats.

In 1998, he was claimed by the Nashville Predators in the expansion draft, but returned to the Montreal Canadiens in 1999 as a free agent without playing a game with Nashville. There he enjoyed his two best NHL seasons, playing 154 games and registering 45 points in the 1999–2000 and 2000–01 seasons, before leaving for the New Jersey Devils as a free agent after playing the 2001–02 season with Quebec of the AHL. Again Darby was unable to consistently remain in the NHL, playing just 5 games over the next two seasons before leaving the Devils and signing as a free agent with the Tampa Bay Lightning, who traded him to the Vancouver Canucks for Future Considerations. After 2006, Darby finished his career in Europe with Augsburger Panther of the DEL in Germany and HC TWK Innsbruck in Austria.

== Career statistics ==
=== Regular season and playoffs ===
			Regular season					Playoffs
Season	Team	League	GP	G	A	Pts	PIM	GP	G	A	Pts	PIM
1987–88	Albany Academy	HS-NY	29	11	27	38	—	—	—	—	—	—
1988–89	Albany Academy	HS-NY	29	36	40	76	—	—	—	—	—	—
1989–90	Albany Academy	HS-NY	29	32	53	85	85	—	—	—	—	—
1990–91	Albany Academy	HS-NY	29	33	61	94	93	4	8	1	9	—
1991–92	Providence College	HE	35	17	24	41	47	—	—	—	—	—
1992–93	Providence College	HE	35	11	21	32	62	—	—	—	—	—
1993–94	Fredericton Canadiens	AHL	66	23	33	56	51	—	—	—	—	—
1994–95	Fredericton Canadiens	AHL	64	21	47	68	82	—	—	—	—	—
1994–95	Montreal Canadiens	NHL	10	0	2	2	0	—	—	—	—	—
1994–95	New York Islanders	NHL	3	0	0	0	0	—	—	—	—	—
1995–96	New York Islanders	NHL	10	0	2	2	0	—	—	—	—	—
1995–96	Worcester IceCats	AHL	68	22	28	50	47	4	1	1	2	2
1996–97	Philadelphia Flyers	NHL	9	1	4	5	2	—	—	—	—	—
1996–97	Philadelphia Phantoms	AHL	59	26	33	59	24	10	3	6	9	0
1997–98	Philadelphia Flyers	NHL	3	1	0	1	0	—	—	—	—	—
1997–98	Philadelphia Phantoms	AHL	77	42	45	87	34	20	5	9	14	4
1998–99	Milwaukee Admirals	IHL	81	32	22	54	33	2	3	0	3	0
1999–00	Montreal Canadiens	NHL	76	7	10	17	14	—	—	—	—	—
2000–01	Montreal Canadiens	NHL	78	12	16	28	16	—	—	—	—	—
2001–02	Montreal Canadiens	NHL	2	0	0	0	0	—	—	—	—	—
2001–02	Quebec Citadelles	AHL	66	16	55	71	18	3	2	1	3	0
2002–03	New Jersey Devils	NHL	3	0	1	1	0	—	—	—	—	—
2002–03	Albany River Rats	AHL	76	23	51	74	42	—	—	—	—	—
2003–04	Albany River Rats	AHL	77	21	48	69	44	—	—	—	—	—
2003–04	New Jersey Devils	NHL	2	0	0	0	0	—	—	—	—	—
2004–05	Springfield Falcons	AHL	70	8	26	34	28	—	—	—	—	—
2005–06	Manitoba Moose	AHL	80	16	36	52	44	13	3	7	10	2
2006–07	Augsburger Panther	DEL	52	17	34	51	56	—	—	—	—	—
2007–08	HC TWK Innsbruck	EBEL	42	13	30	43	30	3	0	0	0	4
AHL totals			703	218	402	620	414	50	14	24	38	8
NHL totals			196	21	35	56	32	—	—	—	—	—

=== International ===
Year	Team	Event	GP	G	A	Pts	PIM
2001	United States	WC	9	0	2	2	2
Senior totals			9	0	2	2	2

== Awards and honors ==
Award	Year
College
All-Hockey East Rookie Team	1991–92
HE Rookie of the Year	1991–92
AHL
First All-Star Team	1997–98
Second All-Star Team	2002–03

Awards and achievements
Preceded by Jeff Levy	Hockey East Rookie of the Year; 1991–92; Shared With; Ian Moran	Succeeded by Paul Kariya
