= 1992 Hockey East men's ice hockey tournament =

1992 Hockey East Men's ice hockey tournament
- Dates: March 6–14, 1992
- Teams: 8
- Finals site: Boston Garden; Boston, Massachusetts
- Champions: Maine (2nd title)
- Winning coach: Shawn Walsh (2nd title)
- MVP: Scott Pellerin (Maine)
- Hockey East Men's Ice Hockey Tournaments

The 1992 Hockey East Men's Ice Hockey Tournament was the 8th tournament in the history of the conference. It was played between March 6 and March 14, 1992. Quarterfinal games were played at home team campus sites, while the final four games were played at the Boston Garden in Boston, Massachusetts, the home venue of the NHL's Boston Bruins. By winning the tournament, Maine received the Hockey East's automatic bid to the 1992 NCAA Division I Men's Ice Hockey Tournament.

== Format ==
The tournament featured three rounds of play with each round being a single-elimination game. In the first round, the first and eighth seeds, the second and seventh seeds, the third seed and sixth seeds, and the fourth seed and fifth seeds played with the winners advancing to the semifinals. In the semifinals, the highest and lowest seeds and second highest and second lowest seeds play with the winners advancing to the championship game. The tournament champion receives an automatic bid to the 1992 NCAA Division I Men's Ice Hockey Tournament.

== Conference standings ==
Note: GP = Games played; W = Wins; L = Losses; T = Ties; PTS = Points; GF = Goals For; GA = Goals Against

1991–92 Hockey East standings
	Conference							Overall					
	GP	W	L	T	PTS	GF	GA	GP	W	L	T	GF	GA
New Hampshire	21	15	4	2	32	94	75	37	24	11	2	168	127
Boston University	21	11	6	4	26	92	88	35	23	8	4	159	124
Maine†*^	21	12	7	2	26	115	54	37	18	17	2	194	89
Providence	21	11	8	2	24	99	79	36	21	13	2	175	134
Boston College	21	10	9	2	22	68	76	36	15	18	3	116	138
Massachusetts–Lowell	21	6	11	4	16	75	91	34	11	19	4	127	155
Northeastern	21	7	14	0	14	70	103	35	16	19	0	142	167
Merrimack	21	4	17	0	8	60	102	34	13	21	0	128	149
Championship: Maine † indicates conference regular season champion * indicates conference tournament champion^ After the season Maine was required to retroactively forfeit 13 games for using a player deemed ineligible by the NCAA

== Bracket ==
Teams are reseeded after the quarterfinals

Quarterfinals; March 6–8
1	Maine	7
8	Merrimack	0
2	New Hampshire	4
7	Northeastern	2
3	Providence	7
6	Massachusetts-Lowell	0
4	Boston University	2
5	Boston College	5

Semifinals; March 12
1	Maine	7
5	Boston College	3
2	New Hampshire	5
3	Providence	3

Championship; March 14
1	Maine	4
2	New Hampshire	1

Note: * denotes overtime period(s)

=== Quarterfinals ===
==== (1) Maine vs. (8) Merrimack ====
March 8	Maine	7 – 0	Merrimack	Alfond Arena

==== (2) New Hampshire vs. (7) Northeastern ====
March 8	New Hampshire	4 – 2	Northeastern	Snively Arena

==== (3) Providence vs. (6) Massachusetts-Lowell ====
March 6	Providence	7 – 0	Massachusetts-Lowell	Schneider Arena

==== (4) Boston University vs. (5) Boston College ====
March 7	Boston University	2 – 5	Boston College	Walter Brown Arena

=== Semifinals ===
==== (1) Maine vs. (5) Boston College ====
March 12	Maine	7 – 3	Boston College	Boston Garden

==== (2) New Hampshire vs. (3) Providence ====
March 12	New Hampshire	5 – 3	Providence	Boston Garden

=== Championship ===
==== (1) Maine vs. (2) New Hampshire ====
March 14	Maine	4 – 1	New Hampshire	Boston Garden

== Tournament awards ==
=== All-Tournament Team ===
- F Domenic Amodeo (New Hampshire)
- F Jim Montgomery (Maine)
- F Scott Pellerin* (Maine)
- D Rob Gaudreau (Providence)
- D Chris Imes (Maine)
- G Jeff Levy (New Hampshire)

* Tournament MVP(s)
