= Swansea, Illinois =

Swansea
- Village
- Flag Logo
- Motto: "A Great Place To Live And Growing Better Every Day"
- Location of Swansea in St. Clair County, Illinois.
- Coordinates: 38°33′15″N 89°59′48″W
- Country: United States
- State: Illinois
- County: St. Clair
- Named after: Swansea, Wales

Government
  - Mayor: Jeff Parker

Area
  - Total: 6.62 sq mi (17.14 km^{2})
  - Land: 6.47 sq mi (16.77 km^{2})
  - Water: 0.14 sq mi (0.37 km^{2})
- Elevation: 564 ft (172 m)

Population (2020)
  - Total: 14,386
  - Density: 2,221.1/sq mi (857.59/km^{2})
- Time zone: UTC-6 (CST)
  - Summer (DST): UTC-5 (CDT)
- ZIP code: 62226
- Area code: 618
- FIPS code: 17-74119
- GNIS feature ID: 2399939
- Website: swanseail.org

Swansea is a village in St. Clair County, Illinois. It is a part of the St. Louis metropolitan area and Metro East in southern Illinois. It is surrounded by the communities of Fairview Heights, Belleville, O’Fallon, and Shiloh. As of the 2020 census, Swansea had a population of 14,386.

== History ==
In the late 19th century the area that is now Swansea was a mix of farming and commerce. It was home to underground coal mines, foundries, brickyards, and the Gundlach Drill Works, manufacturers of the most efficient grain drills of that era. The early residents were fiercely independent and bent on conducting their own affairs. When the municipality that sat on their doorstep reached out to annex their lands and businesses they decided to start their own community.

On November 27, 1886, a group of 35 area residents petitioned the county government "that they are desirous of having said territory organized as a village...That the name of the proposed village shall be New Swansea."

The residents voted on December 16, 1886, to form their own community and name it “New Swansea”. A petition for annexation to the city of Belleville was being circulated in the territory. Establishing an independent community was a quick and effective method of avoiding annexation. And so a new municipality was incorporated on December 20, 1886. In 1898 the lot at the corner of Brackett and Illinois Streets was purchased for $300. The Village Hall was completed shortly thereafter at a cost of $619.50.

In April 1895, an ordinance was passed to change the name of the village from “New Swansea” to just “Swansea”, in order to conform to the name given by the USPS to the post office established in the village.

== Geography ==
According to the 2010 census, Swansea has a total area of 6.434 square miles (16.66 km^{2}), of which 6.26 square miles (16.21 km^{2}) (or 97.3%) is land and 0.174 square miles (0.45 km^{2}) (or 2.7%) is water. Swansea is largely flat and runs primarily in a north–south direction along the Illinois route 159 corridor. It is bounded by Belleville to the south and west, Fairview Heights to the north and Shiloh to the east. The City of Saint Louis, Missouri, lies 16 miles to the west.

== Demographics ==
=== Racial and ethnic composition ===
Swansea, Illinois – Racial and ethnic composition Note: the US Census treats Hispanic/Latino as an ethnic category. This table excludes Latinos from the racial categories and assigns them to a separate category. Hispanics/Latinos may be of any race.
Race / Ethnicity (NH = Non-Hispanic)	Pop 2000	Pop 2010	Pop 2020	% 2000	% 2010	% 2020
White alone (NH)	9,201	10,349	9,286	86.97%	77.06%	64.55%
Black or African American alone (NH)	909	2209	3268	8.59%	16.45%	22.72%
Native American or Alaska Native alone (NH)	23	21	35	0.22%	0.16%	0.24%
Asian alone (NH)	166	235	389	1.57%	1.75%	2.70%
Native Hawaiian or Pacific Islander alone (NH)	8	24	18	0.08%	0.18%	0.13%
Other race alone (NH)	5	16	70	0.05%	0.12%	0.49%
Mixed race or Multiracial (NH)	104	267	731	0.98%	1.99%	5.08%
Hispanic or Latino (any race)	163	309	589	1.54%	2.30%	4.09%
Total	10,579	13,430	14,386	100.00%	100.00%	100.00%

Historical population
Census	Pop.	Note	%±
1900	735		—
1910	889		21.0%
1920	1,048		17.9%
1930	1,201		14.6%
1940	1,156		−3.7%
1950	1,816		57.1%
1960	3,018		66.2%
1970	5,432		80.0%
1980	5,529		1.8%
1990	8,201		48.3%
2000	10,579		29.0%
2010	13,430		26.9%
2020	14,386		7.1%
2024 (est.)	14,445		0.4%
U.S. Decennial Census

=== 2020 census ===
As of the 2020 census, Swansea had a population of 14,386. The median age was 43.8 years. 20.7% of residents were under the age of 18 and 20.6% of residents were 65 years of age or older. For every 100 females there were 88.6 males, and for every 100 females age 18 and over there were 85.1 males age 18 and over.

100.0% of residents lived in urban areas, while 0.0% lived in rural areas.

There were 6,064 households in Swansea, of which 27.1% had children under the age of 18 living in them. Of all households, 47.7% were married-couple households, 15.9% were households with a male householder and no spouse or partner present, and 30.5% were households with a female householder and no spouse or partner present. About 30.5% of all households were made up of individuals and 14.9% had someone living alone who was 65 years of age or older.

There were 6,444 housing units, of which 5.9% were vacant. The homeowner vacancy rate was 1.8% and the rental vacancy rate was 8.4%.

=== 2000 census ===
As of the census of 2000, there were 10,579 people, 3,937 households, and 2,799 families living in the village. The population density was 2,085.6 inhabitants per square mile (805.3/km^{2}). There were 4,110 housing units at an average density of 810.2 per square mile (312.8/km^{2}). The racial makeup of the village was 88.03% White, 8.59% African American, 0.24% Native American, 1.61% Asian, 0.08% Pacific Islander, 0.33% from other races, and 1.12% from two or more races. Hispanic or Latino of any race were 1.54% of the population.

There were 3,937 households, out of which 37.3% had children under the age of 18 living with them, 57.6% were married couples living together, 10.3% had a female householder with no husband present, and 28.9% were non-families. 24.4% of all households were made up of individuals, and 10.1% had someone living alone who was 65 years of age or older. The average household size was 2.59 and the average family size was 3.11.

In the village, the population was spread out, with 26.6% under the age of 18, 7.4% from 18 to 24, 29.6% from 25 to 44, 21.5% from 45 to 64, and 14.9% who were 65 years of age or older. The median age was 38 years. For every 100 females, there were 90.4 males. For every 100 females age 18 and over, there were 87.1 males.

The median income for a household in the village was $49,851, and the median income for a family was $58,032. Males had a median income of $40,747 versus $29,911 for females. The per capita income for the village was $25,634. About 4.9% of families and 6.7% of the population were below the poverty line, including 8.5% of those under age 18 and 1.5% of those age 65 or over.

== Education ==
Swansea is home to two school districts:

District 113 - Wolf Branch School District. This district includes Wolf Branch Elementary School and Wolf Branch Middle School. The mascots for both schools are the Wolverines.
District 116 - High Mount School District. This district includes High Mount School.

High school aged students in Swansea attend school in Belleville Township District 201, including both Belleville East and Belleville West high schools. Alternate private high schools include Althoff Catholic High School.

== Health care ==
Swansea is home to a satellite facility of the Alvin J. Siteman Cancer Center.

== Notable person ==
- Clayton Keller - NHL player, 7th overall pick in 2016 NHL Entry Draft
