= Ian Moran =

American ice hockey player

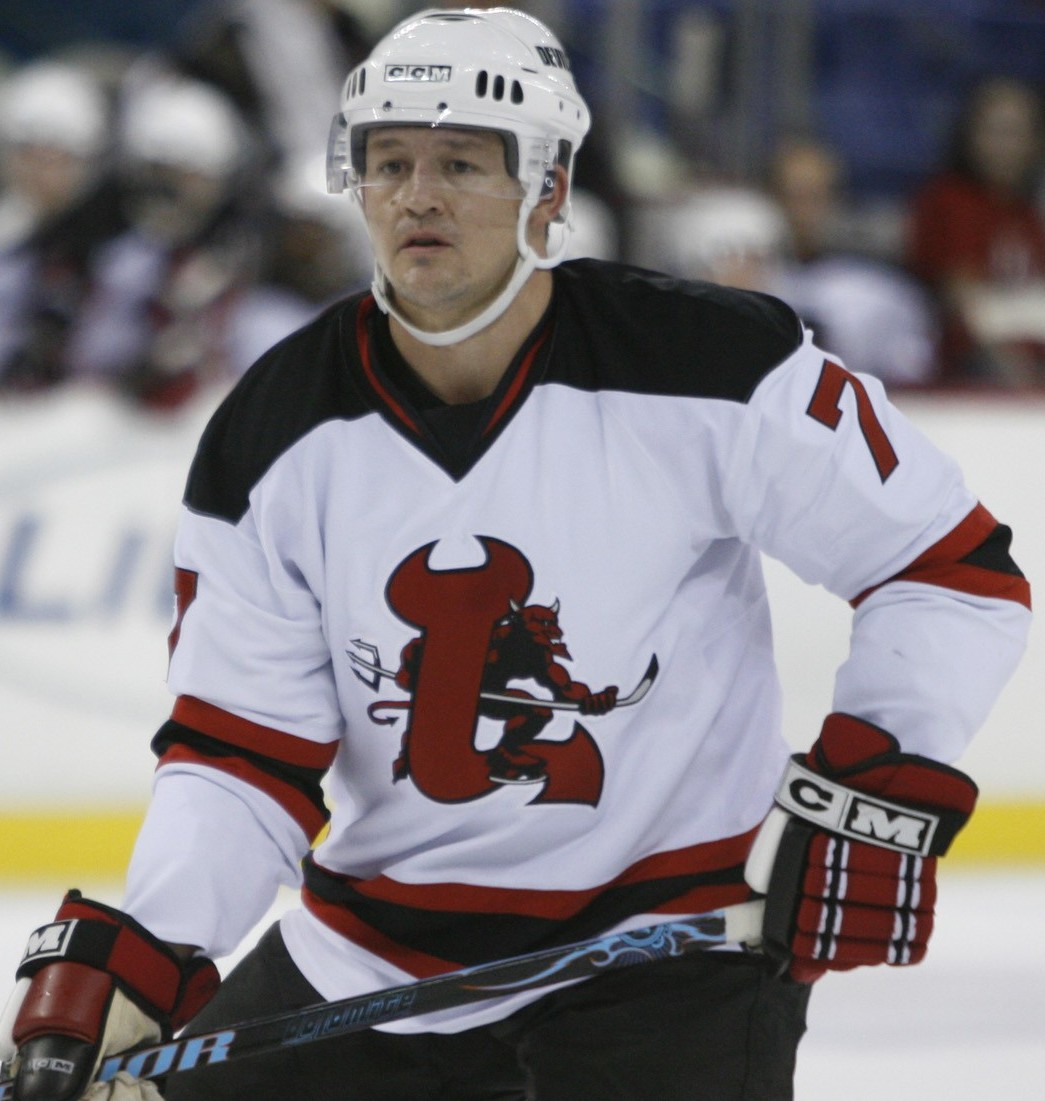
- Moran with the Lowell Devils during the 2007-08 season
- Born: August 24, 1972 (age 53) Cleveland, Ohio, U.S.
- Height: 6 ft 0 in (183 cm)
- Weight: 200 lb (91 kg; 14 st 4 lb)
- Position: Defense
- Shot: Right
- Played for: Pittsburgh Penguins; Boston Bruins; Anaheim Ducks
- National team: United States
- NHL draft: 107th overall, 1990; Pittsburgh Penguins
- Playing career: 1993–2008

Ian Patrick Moran (born August 24, 1972) is an American former professional ice hockey defenseman. Throughout his 15-year professional career, Moran played for the Pittsburgh Penguins, Boston Bruins and Anaheim Ducks in the National Hockey League (NHL). He retired in 2008 after suffering a knee injury. Since 2017 he has served as the head scout and Director of Neutral Zone New England.

Moran was the head coach of the Evansville Thunderbolts in the Southern Professional Hockey League during the 2018–19 season.

== Early life ==
Moran was born in Cleveland, Ohio, on August 24, 1972, to parents Michael and Anita. He is the oldest of three children, having younger sisters Mary Pierce and Meghann. He found an interest in hockey at age 4 and began playing. As a youth, he played in the 1986 Quebec International Pee-Wee Hockey Tournament with a minor ice hockey team from New Haven, Connecticut.

After moving frequently as a kid, his family eventually settled in Acton, Massachusetts, a suburb of Boston. He attended high school at the Belmont Hill School. After graduating high school, Moran went to Boston College with a full ice hockey scholarship.

== Playing career ==
Moran started his professional career with the Pittsburgh Penguins when he was drafted in the 6th round (107th overall) in the 1990 NHL Draft. He made his debut for the Penguins during their playoff run in the 1993–94 NHL season. In 433 career regular season games with the Penguins, Moran tallied 19 goals, 44 assists, and 281 penalty minutes. On March 11, 2003, Moran was traded to the Boston Bruins for a fourth round selection in 2003, which became Paul Bissonnette. Moran found out about the trade while playing hopscotch in his driveway with his daughter and ended up writing the phone number to the Bruins' general manager on his driveway in chalk.

During the 2004–05 NHL lockout, Moran had spells in the Sweden's HockeyAllsvenskan for Bofors IK and the United Kingdom's Elite Ice Hockey League for the Nottingham Panthers, however he was sidelined most of the year with a knee injury. Eventually, Moran signed with the Anaheim Ducks on August 15, 2006. Moran only played one game with the Ducks as he split the season with the American Hockey League with the Portland Pirates and then in the Deutsche Eishockey Liga for Eisbären Berlin in Germany.

After departing from Germany, Moran signed as an unrestricted free agent with the New Jersey Devils on July 24, 2007. Moran played for the Devils’ minor league affiliate Lowell Devils and suffered another knee injury, and was never called up to play at the NHL level again. By season's end, Moran became a free agent and ended his professional career.

== Personal life ==
He resides in Duxbury, Massachusetts, with his wife Britta, and their four children; Mattigan (born 2000), Weston (born 2002), Luke (born 2004), and Leighton (born 2007). He currently owns and runs his own hockey skills business IM Hockey Skills out of Dedham, Massachusetts, as well as, since 2017, being the head New England scout for and director of Neutral Zone Ice (neutralzone.net).

== Career statistics ==
=== Regular season and playoffs ===
			Regular season					Playoffs
Season	Team	League	GP	G	A	Pts	PIM	GP	G	A	Pts	PIM
1987–88	Belmont Hill School	USHS	25	3	13	16	15	—	—	—	—	—
1988–89	Belmont Hill School	USHS	23	7	25	32	8	—	—	—	—	—
1989–90	Belmont Hill School	USHS	23	10	36	46	10	—	—	—	—	—
1990–91	Belmont Hill School	USHS	23	7	44	51	12	—	—	—	—	—
1991–92	Boston College	HE	30	2	16	18	44	—	—	—	—	—
1992–93	Boston College	HE	31	8	12	20	32	—	—	—	—	—
1993–94	United States National Team	Intl	50	8	15	23	69	—	—	—	—	—
1993–94	Cleveland Lumberjacks	IHL	33	5	13	18	39	—	—	—	—	—
1994–95	Cleveland Lumberjacks	IHL	64	7	31	38	94	4	0	1	1	2
1994–95	Pittsburgh Penguins	NHL	—	—	—	—	—	8	0	0	0	0
1995–96	Pittsburgh Penguins	NHL	51	1	1	2	47	—	—	—	—	—
1996–97	Pittsburgh Penguins	NHL	36	4	5	9	22	5	1	2	3	4
1996–97	Cleveland Lumberjacks	IHL	36	6	23	29	26	—	—	—	—	—
1997–98	Pittsburgh Penguins	NHL	37	1	6	7	19	6	0	0	0	2
1998–99	Pittsburgh Penguins	NHL	62	4	5	9	37	13	0	2	2	8
1999–2000	Pittsburgh Penguins	NHL	73	4	8	12	28	11	0	1	1	2
2000–01	Pittsburgh Penguins	NHL	40	3	4	7	28	18	0	1	1	4
2001–02	Pittsburgh Penguins	NHL	64	2	8	10	54	—	—	—	—	—
2002–03	Pittsburgh Penguins	NHL	70	0	7	7	46	—	—	—	—	—
2002–03	Boston Bruins	NHL	8	0	1	1	2	5	0	1	1	4
2003–04	Boston Bruins	NHL	35	1	4	5	28	—	—	—	—	—
2004–05	Bofors IK	Allsv	7	0	4	4	22	—	—	—	—	—
2004–05	Nottingham Panthers	EIHL	9	0	4	4	8	7	0	1	1	2
2005–06	Boston Bruins	NHL	12	1	1	2	10	—	—	—	—	—
2006–07	Anaheim Ducks	NHL	1	0	0	0	0	—	—	—	—	—
2006–07	Portland Pirates	AHL	18	1	4	5	10	—	—	—	—	—
2006–07	Eisbären Berlin	DEL	9	1	4	5	8	3	0	0	0	2
2007–08	Lowell Devils	AHL	12	1	1	2	15	—	—	—	—	—
IHL totals			133	18	67	85	159	4	0	1	1	2
NHL totals			489	21	50	71	321	66	1	7	8	24

=== International ===
Year	Team	Event	Result	GP	G	A	Pts	PIM
1991	United States	WJC	4th	6	0	2	2	2
1993	United States	WC	6th	6	0	0	0	0
Junior totals				6	0	2	2	2
Senior totals				6	0	0	0	0

== Awards and honors ==
Award	Year
College
HE All-Rookie Team	1992
HE Rookie of the Year	1992

Awards and achievements
Preceded by Jeff Levy	Hockey East Rookie of the Year; 1991–92; Shared With; Craig Darby	Succeeded by Paul Kariya
