= Jeff Levy =

American ice hockey player (born 1970)

- Born: December 9, 1970 (age 55) Omaha, Nebraska, USA
- Height: 6 ft 0 in (183 cm)
- Weight: 170 lb (77 kg; 12 st 2 lb)
- Position: Goaltender
- Caught: Left
- Played for: New Hampshire; Kalamazoo Wings; Huntington Blizzard; Jacksonville Lizard Kings; El Paso Buzzards; Rio Grande Valley Killer Bees
- NHL draft: 134th, 1990; Minnesota North Stars
- Playing career: 1990–2005

Jeffrey Levy is an American ice hockey coach and former goaltender who was an All-American for New Hampshire.

== Career ==
Levy grew up in Salt Lake City and played high school hockey in the region. He took a chance to advance his career by moving to Minnesota for his senior year. He managed to get on the Rochester Mustangs as a third goaltender and played well in his minimal appearances. The following year he became the team's starter and began to make a name for himself. Levy helped the Mustangs win the US National junior ice hockey championship in 1990 and he used the notoriety to earn a scholarship to the University of New Hampshire. Levy was also selected by the Minnesota North Stars in the NHL Draft that summer, something he admittedly didn't fully comprehend.

Levy made an immediate impact in college, taking over as the starter as a freshman and being named an All-American. He backstopped the Wildcats to the team's first winning season in 7 years and was among the best goaltenders in terms of production for the year. The following season he continued to improve and led UNH to the Hockey East championship game and was named the best goaltender of the tournament. The team's stellar season also helped them earn an at-large bid to the NCAA Tournament for the first time in 9 years. After his sophomore season, he was offered an NHL contract by the North Stars and he accepted.

When he appeared in training camp in the fall, Levy was not prepared for the vast difference between college and the NHL levels. He played a year in the minors with the Kalamazoo Wings but was definitely a work in progress for an extended professional career. That offseason he was also invited to take part in the tryout for the US national team for the upcoming Winter Olympics and made the squad along with fellow college standouts Mike Dunham and Garth Snow. Levy ended up becoming the third goaltender on the squad and, due to a lack of available playing time, was returned to Minnesota prior to the game and did not participate. His pro career never fully materialized, unfortunately, and after getting demoted to the ECHL, Levy retired once his rookie contract with the North Stars expired.

Levy was frustrated by how his career had gone and he remained out of the game for five years. Eventually, however, he caught 'the bug' and wanted to get back into the net. He returned to minor pro hockey for the later half of the 2000 season and played in parts of five campaigns. Levy was much happier with his play after his return and believed that, if he had played as well earlier, he could have continued at a higher level for much longer.

After retiring as a player, Levy returned to the game as a coach at the junior hockey level, helping teach his son Hank how to improve his play.

== Statistics ==
=== Regular season and playoffs ===
			Regular season									Playoffs
Season	Team	League	GP	W	L	T	MIN	GA	SO	GAA	SV%	GP	W	L	MIN	GA	SO	GAA	SV%
1988–89	Rochester Mustangs	USHL	9	7	1	1	—	—	—	—	—	—	—	—	—	—	—	—	—
1989–90	Rochester Mustangs	USHL	32	24	7	0	1823	97	0	3.19	.900	—	—	—	—	—	—	—	—
1990–91	New Hampshire	Hockey East	24	15	7	2	1490	80	0	3.22	.905	—	—	—	—	—	—	—	—
1991–92	New Hampshire	Hockey East	35	20	13	2	1971	108	2	3.29	.898	—	—	—	—	—	—	—	—
1992–93	Kalamazoo Wings	IHL	28	8	14	1	1512	115	0	4.56	.866	—	—	—	—	—	—	—	—
1992–93	Dayton Bombers	ECHL	1	0	0	1	65	3	0	2.77	.909	2	—	—	—	—	—	—	—
1993–94	Team USA	International	—	—	—	—	—	—	—	—	—	—	—	—	—	—	—	—	—
1993–94	Kalamazoo Wings	IHL	2	0	0	1	59	4	0	4.06	.840	—	—	—	—	—	—	—	—
1993–94	Dayton Bombers	ECHL	31	10	13	3	1672	125	0	4.48	.879	—	—	—	—	—	—	—	—
1994–95	Huntington Blizzard	ECHL	36	6	22	1	1844	138	0	4.49	.874	4	—	—	—	—	—	—	—
1999–00	Jacksonville Lizard Kings	ECHL	12	2	5	0	507	43	0	5.09	.857	—	—	—	—	—	—	—	—
2000–01	El Paso Buzzards	WPHL	56	23	25	7	3241	167	2	3.09	.901	7	—	—	—	—	—	—	—
2001–02	El Paso Buzzards	CHL	29	18	8	2	1651	74	2	2.69	.905	10	—	—	—	—	—	—	—
2003–04	Rio Grande Valley Killer Bees	CHL	48	25	17	5	2798	103	4	2.21	.922	3	—	—	—	—	—	—	—
2004–05	Rio Grande Valley Killer Bees	CHL	45	18	14	1	2610	133	2	3.06	.897	—	—	—	—	—	—	—	—
NCAA totals			59	35	20	4	3461	191	2	3.26	.901	—	—	—	—	—	—	—	—
ECHL totals			80	18	40	5	4088	309	0	4.54	.874	6	—	—	—	—	—	—	—
CHL totals			122	61	49	8	7059	310	8	2.63	.909	13	—	—	—	—	—	—	—

== Awards and honors ==
Award	Year
USHL Goaltender of the Year	1989–90
All-Hockey East Second Team	1990–91
Hockey East All-Rookie Team	1990–91
AHCA East Second-Team All-American	1990–91
Hockey East All-Tournament Team	1992

Awards and achievements
Preceded by Scott Cashman	Hockey East Rookie of the Year; 1990–91	Succeeded by Craig Darby / Ian Moran
