= 2009 CCHA men's ice hockey tournament =

2009 CCHA Men's ice hockey tournament
- 2009 CCHA Men's Ice Hockey Tournament logo
- Dates: March 6–21, 2009
- Teams: 12
- Finals site: Joe Louis Arena; Detroit, Michigan
- Champions: Notre Dame (2nd title)
- Winning coach: Jeff Jackson (6th title)
- MVP: Jordan Pearce (Notre Dame)
- CCHA Men's Ice Hockey Tournaments

The 2009 CCHA Men's Ice Hockey Tournament was the 38th CCHA Men's Ice Hockey Tournament. It was played between March 6 and March 21, 2009 at campus locations and at Joe Louis Arena in Detroit, Michigan, United States. Notre Dame won their second CCHA Men's Ice Hockey Tournament and Mason Cup and received the Central Collegiate Hockey Association's automatic bid to the 2009 NCAA Division I Men's Ice Hockey Tournament.

== Format ==
The tournament features four rounds of play. In the first round, the fifth and twelfth, sixth and eleventh, seventh and tenth, and eighth and ninth seeds as determined by the final regular season standings play a best-of-three series, with the winner advancing to the quarterfinals. There, the first seed and lowest-ranked first-round winner, the second seed and second-lowest-ranked first-round winner, the third seed and second-highest-ranked first-round winner, and the fourth seed and highest-ranked first-round winner play a best-of-three series, with the winner advancing to the semifinals. In the semifinals, the highest and lowest seeds and second-highest and second-lowest seeds play a single game, with the winner advancing to the championship game and the loser advancing to the third-place game. The tournament champion receives an automatic bid to the 2009 NCAA Men's Division I Ice Hockey Tournament.

=== Regular season standings ===
Note: GP = Games played; W = Wins; L = Losses; T = Ties; PTS = Points; GF = Goals For; GA = Goals Against

2008–09 Central Collegiate Hockey Association standings
	Conference								Overall					
	GP	W	L	T	SW	PTS	GF	GA	GP	W	L	T	GF	GA
#4 Notre Dame†*	28	21	4	3	3	48	95	52	40	31	6	3	135	69
#5 Michigan	28	20	8	0	0	40	98	51	41	29	12	0	145	84
#2 Miami	28	17	7	4	2	40	89	57	41	23	13	5	128	89
Alaska	28	0^	28^	0^	0^	34	54	51	39	0^	39^	0^	74	68
Ohio State	28	13	11	4	3	33	87	85	42	23	15	4	143	119
Northern Michigan	28	11	12	5	3	30	72	73	41	19	17	5	111	103
Western Michigan	28	9	13	6	2	26	75	86	41	14	20	7	111	130
Nebraska–Omaha	28	8	13	7	3	26	62	76	40	15	17	8	98	103
Ferris State	28	9	14	5	2	25	58	68	38	12	19	7	90	105
Lake Superior State	28	7	15	6	1	21	73	86	39	11	20	8	110	115
Michigan State	28	7	17	4	3	21	43	85	38	10	23	5	62	118
Bowling Green	28	8	19	1	0	17	60	96	38	11	24	3	89	131
Championship: Notre Dame † indicates conference regular season champion * indicates conference tournament champion Final rankings: USA Today/USA Hockey Magazine Top 15 Poll^ Alaska was retroactively required to forfeit all wins and ties due to player ineligibilities.

== Bracket ==
First round March 6–8
5	Ohio State	5	7	—
12	Bowling Green	4	1	—
6	Northern Michigan	5	8	—
11	Michigan State	3	2	—
7	Western Michigan	3	4**	3
10	Lake Superior State	6	3	1
8	Nebraska-Omaha	3	5	—
9	Ferris State	0	2	—

Quarterfinals; March 13–15
1	Notre Dame	5	1	—
8	Nebraska-Omaha	0	0	—
2	Michigan	5	6	—
7	Western Michigan	2	1	—
3	Miami	3	2	1
6	Northern Michigan	2	3*	3
4	Alaska	4	2	1
5	Ohio State	0	4	0

Semifinals; March 20
1	Notre Dame	2
6	Northern Michigan	1
2	Michigan	3
4	Alaska	1

Championship; March 21
1	Notre Dame	5
2	Michigan	2
Third place
4	Alaska	0
6	Northern Michigan	2

Note: * denotes overtime period(s)

=== First round ===
==== (5) Ohio State vs. (12) Bowling Green ====
March 6	Ohio State	5 – 4	Bowling Green	OSU Ice Arena	Recap
Corey Elkins - 13:30		First period	18:27 - Nick Bailen
Corey Toy - 11:30		Second period	15:39 - Tommy Dee
Chris Reed - 03:14; Peter Boyd - 05:18; Peter Boyd - 14:23		Third period	05:52 - Dan Sexton; 14:50 - Tommy Dee
Dustin Carlson ( 32 saves / 36 shots )		Goalie stats	Jimmy Spratt ( 24 saves / 29 shots )

March 7	Ohio State	7 – 1	Bowling Green	OSU Ice Arena	Recap
Sergio Somma - 19:03		First period	No scoring
Corey Elkins - 02:20; Corey Elkins - 09:31; Matt Bartkowski - pp - 12:18; Shane Sims - pp - 19:08		Second period	09:59 - Nick Bailen
Corey Elkins - 12:54; Mathieu Picard - 18:26		Third period	No scoring
Dustin Carlson ( 28 saves / 29 shots )		Goalie stats	Jimmy Spratt ( 18 saves / 23 shots ) Nick Eno ( 4 saves / 6 shots )

Ohio State won series 2–0

==== (6) Northern Michigan vs. (11) Michigan State ====
March 6	Northern Michigan	5 – 3	Michigan State	Berry Events Center	Recap
Ben Lindemulder - 11:10; Tyler Gron - 17:50		First period	10:55 - pp - Brett Perlini
Mark Olver - 04:10; Billy Smith - sh - 19:43		Second period	No scoring
Erik Gustafsson - 10:51		Third period	05:07 - Kurt Kivisto; 19:12 - Daultan Leveille
Brian Stewart ( 18 saves / 21 shots )		Goalie stats	Jeff Lerg ( 24 saves / 29 shots )

March 7	Northern Michigan	8 – 2	Michigan State	Berry Events Center	Recap
Gregor Hanson - 11:46; Nick Sirota - 17:03		First period	18:12 - Dustin Gazley
Ben Lindemulder - 06:54; Ray Kaunisto - 12:48; Mark Olver - 16:27		Second period	No scoring
Jared Brown - 04:57; Phil Fox - 05:38; Nick Sirota - sh - 15:08		Third period	16:54 - Dustin Gazley
Brian Stewart ( 20 saves / 22 shots )		Goalie stats	Jeff Lerg ( 21 saves / 29 shots )

Northern Michigan won series 2–0

==== (7) Western Michigan vs. (10) Lake Superior State ====
March 6	Western Michigan	3 – 6	Lake Superior State	Lawson Arena	Recap
No Scoring		First period	03:47 - pp - Nathan Perkovich; 08:26 - Troy Schwab; 12:01 - Matt Cowie
J. J. Crew - 04:08		Second period	00:27 - Fred Cassiani; 02:34 - Brad Cooper; 10:32 - pp - Nathan Perkovich
Kevin Connauton - pp - 01:54; Patrick Galivan - pp - 07:59		Third period	No scoring
Riley Gill ( 21 saves / 27 shots ) Jerry Kuhn ( 12 saves / 12 shots )		Goalie stats	Brian Mahoney-Wilson ( 39 saves / 42 shots )

March 7	Western Michigan	4 – 3	2OT	Lake Superior State	Lawson Arena	Recap
Greg Squires - 09:46; Kevin Connauton - pp - 16:46		First period		13:19 - Dan Barczuk
Jared Katz - 07:24		Second period		17:17 - Nathan Perkovich
No scoring		Third period		17:30 - Matt Cowie
Kevin Connauton - 07:57		Second overtime period		No scoring
Riley Gill ( 54 saves / 57 shots )		Goalie stats		Brian Mahoney-Wilson ( 41 saves / 45 shots )

March 8	Western Michigan	3 – 1	Lake Superior State	Lawson Arena	Recap
Tyler Ludwig - pp - 13:10		First period	17:19 - pp - Nathan Perkovich
Kyle O'Kane - 03:42; J. J. Crew - 19:46		Second period	No scoring
No scoring		Third period	No scoring
Riley Gill ( 29 saves / 30 shots )		Goalie stats	Pat Inglis ( 25 saves / 28 shots )

Western Michigan won series 2–1

==== (8) Nebraska-Omaha vs. (9) Ferris State ====
March 6	Nebraska-Omaha	3 – 0	Ferris State	Qwest Center Omaha	Recap
No Scoring		First period	No scoring
Alex Hudson - 05:28; J. P. Platisha - sh - 09:55		Second period	No scoring
Matt Ambroz - pp - 01:21		Third period	No scoring
Jerad Kaufmann ( 24 saves / 24 shots )		Goalie stats	Taylor Nelson ( 29 saves / 32 shots )

March 7	Nebraska-Omaha	5 – 2	Ferris State	Qwest Center Omaha	Recap
Matt Ambroz - pp - 18:54		First period	No scoring
Joey Martin - 01:31; J. J. Koehler - 03:32; Joey Martin - 15:04		Second period	07:16 - Brendan Connolly
Eddie Del Grosso - sh - 10:55		Third period	11:14 - pp - Brendan Connolly
Jerad Kaufmann ( 18 saves / 20 shots )		Goalie stats	Pat Nagle ( 30 saves / 35 shots )

Nebraska-Omaha won series 2–0

=== Quarterfinals ===
==== (1) Notre Dame vs. (8) Nebraska-Omaha ====
March 13	Notre Dame	5 – 0	Nebraska-Omaha	Joyce Center	Recap
Calle Ridderwall - 02:01; Ben Ryan - pp - 07:18; Billy Maday - 15:46; Ryan Thang - 17:06		First period	No scoring
No scoring		Second period	No scoring
Ryan Guentzel - 16:47		Third period	No scoring
Jordan Pearce ( 30 saves / 30 shots )		Goalie stats	Jerad Kaufmann ( 11 saves / 15 shots ) Jermie Dupont ( 15 saves / 16 shots )

March 14	Notre Dame	1 – 0	Nebraska-Omaha	Joyce Center	Recap
Justin White - 02:34		First period	No scoring
No scoring		Second period	No scoring
No scoring		Third period	No scoring
Jordan Pearce ( 30 saves / 30 shots )		Goalie stats	Jerad Kaufmann ( 23 saves / 24 shots )

Notre Dame won series 2–0

==== (2) Michigan vs. (7) Western Michigan ====
March 13	Michigan	5 – 2	Western Michigan	Yost Ice Arena	Recap
Ben Winnett - 02:57; Chad Langlais - pp - 07:08; Carl Hagelin - sh - 19:58		First period	No scoring
No scoring		Second period	12:12 - J. J. Crew; 18:24 - pp - Kyle O'Kane
Matt Rust - 16:44; Carl Hagelin - en - 18:58		Third period	No scoring
Bryan Hogan ( 16 saves / 18 shots )		Goalie stats	Riley Gill ( 43 saves / 47 shots )

March 14	Michigan	6 – 1	Western Michigan	Yost Ice Arena	Recap
Aaron Palushaj - 01:53; Brian Lebler - pp - 02:45; David Wohlberg - 19:57		First period	No scoring
Aaron Palushaj - 19:35		Second period	13:56 - Patrick Galivan
Matt Rust - 05:49; Tim Miller - 07:43		Third period	No scoring
Bryan Hogan ( 16 saves / 17 shots ) Billy Sauer ( 6 saves / 6 shots )		Goalie stats	Riley Gill ( 49 saves / 55 shots )

Michigan won series 2–0

==== (3) Miami vs. (6) Northern Michigan ====
March 13	Miami	3 – 2	Northern Michigan	Steve Cady Arena	Recap
Justin Mercier - 07:37; Carter Camper - pp - 14:49		First period	No scoring
No scoring		Second period	08:59 - pp - Justin Florek
Andy Miele - pp - 18:06		Third period	18:40 - pp - Nick Sirota
Cody Reichard ( 24 saves / 26 shots )		Goalie stats	Brian Stewart ( 37 saves / 40 shots )

March 14	Miami	2 – 3	OT	Northern Michigan	Steve Cady Arena	Recap
Andy Miele - 10:16		First period		15:10 - Jared Brown
Justin Vaive - 04:33		Second period		04:04 - pp - Nick Sirota
No scoring		Third period		No scoring
No scoring		First overtime period		05:12 - Gregor Hanson
Connor Knapp ( 19 saves / 22 shots )		Goalie stats		Brian Stewart ( 39 saves / 41 shots )

March 15	Miami	1 – 3	Northern Michigan	Steve Cady Arena	Recap
No Scoring		First period	05:41 - sh - Mark Olver
No scoring		Second period	10:55 - Mike Maltese
Will Weber - 17:53		Third period	19:25 - en - Nick Sirota
Connor Knapp ( 16 saves / 18 shots )		Goalie stats	Brian Stewart ( 41 saves / 42 shots )

Northern Michigan won series 2–1

==== (4) Alaska vs. (5) Ohio State ====
March 13	Alaska	4 – 0	Ohio State	Carlson Center	Recap
Adam Naglich - 07:57; Justin Filzen - 12:00		First period	No scoring
Kevin Petovello - pp - 05:39		Second period	No scoring
Dion Knelsen - sh - 18:03		Third period	No scoring
Chad Johnson ( 22 saves / 22 shots )		Goalie stats	Dustin Carlson ( 22 saves / 25 shots )

March 14	Alaska	2 – 4	Ohio State	Carlson Center	Recap
No Scoring		First period	04:23 - Kyle Reed; 15:26 - pp - Shane Sims
Scott Enders - pp - 13:22		Second period	11:14 - Kyle Reed
Dion Knelsen - sh - 00:46		Third period	04:46 - C. J. Severyn
Chad Johnson ( 25 saves / 29 shots )		Goalie stats	Dustin Carlson ( 31 saves / 33 shots )

March 15	Alaska	1 – 0	Ohio State	Carlson Center
No Scoring		First period	No scoring
No scoring		Second period	No scoring
Ron Meyers - 19:10		Third period	No scoring
Chad Johnson ( 25 saves / 26 shots )		Goalie stats	Dustin Carlson ( 43 saves / 43 shots )

Alaska won series 2–1

=== Semifinals ===
==== (1) Notre Dame vs. (6) Northern Michigan ====
March 20	Notre Dame	2 – 1	Northern Michigan	Joe Louis Arena	Recap
Kyle Lawson - pp - 04:15		First period	No scoring
No scoring		Second period	No scoring
Ben Ryan - 19:00		Third period	18:37 - Nick Sirota
Jordan Pearce ( 21 saves / 22 shots )		Goalie stats	Brian Stewart ( 34 saves / 36 shots )

==== (2) Michigan vs. (4) Alaska ====
March 20	Michigan	3 – 1	Alaska	Joe Louis Arena	Recap
Chad Langlais - pp - 17:17		First period	No scoring
Louie Caporusso - 15:49		Second period	13:35 - pp - Braden Walls
Aaron Palushaj - en pp - 17:56		Third period	No scoring
Bryan Hogan ( 25 saves / 26 shots )		Goalie stats	Chad Johnson ( 29 saves / 31 shots )

=== Third place ===
==== (4) Alaska vs. (6) Northern Michigan ====
March 21	Alaska	0 – 2	Northern Michigan	Joe Louis Arena	Recap
No Scoring		First period	No scoring
No scoring		Second period	No scoring
No scoring		Third period	05:58 - Tyler Gron; 19:48 - en - Nick Sirota
Chad Johnson ( 26 saves / 27 shots )		Goalie stats	Derek Janzen ( 31 saves / 31 shots )

=== Championship ===
==== (1) Notre Dame vs. (2) Michigan ====
March 21	Notre Dame	5 – 2	Michigan	Joe Louis Arena	Recap
No Scoring		First period	14:32 - Luke Glendening
Billy Maday - 12:11		Second period	02:10 - David Wohlberg
Calle Ridderwall - pp - 01:15; Ben Ryan - 02:05; Calle Ridderwall - 11:11; Christiaan Minella - 16:53		Third period	No scoring
Jordan Pearce ( 28 saves / 30 shots )		Goalie stats	Bryan Hogan ( 29 saves / 34 shots )

== Tournament awards ==
=== All-Tournament Team ===
- F Ben Ryan (Notre Dame)
- F Calle Ridderwall (Notre Dame)
- F Louie Caporusso (Michigan)
- D Steven Kampfer (Michigan)
- D Ian Cole (Notre Dame)
- G Jordan Pearce* (Notre Dame)

* Most Valuable Player(s)
