= List of Ohio State Buckeyes men's ice hockey seasons =

This is a list of seasons completed by the Ohio State Buckeyes men's ice hockey team. The list documents the season-by-season records of the Buckeyes from 1963 to present, including conference and national post season records.

== Season-by-season results ==
NCAA D-I Champions	NCAA Frozen Four	Conference regular season champions	Conference Playoff Champions

Season	Conference	Regular Season (Note: Code explanation; GP—Games Played, W—Wins, L—Losses, T—Tied games, OTW—Overtime Wins, OTL—Overtime Loses, 3/SW—Win in 3 on 3 overtime or shootout, Pts—Points*)														Conference Tournament Results	National Tournament Results
Season	Conference	Conference									Overall					Conference Tournament Results	National Tournament Results
Season	Conference	GP	W	L	T	OTW	OTL	3/SW	Pts*	Finish	GP	W	L	T	%	Conference Tournament Results	National Tournament Results
Tom Bedecki (1963–1965)
1963–64	Independent	-	-	-	-	-	-	-	-	-	10	2	8	0	.200		
University Division
1964–65	Independent	-	-	-	-	-	-	-	-	-	10	4	6	0	.400		
Glen Sonmor (1965–1966)
1965–66	Independent	-	-	-	-	-	-	-	-	-	16	9	7	0	.563		
Harry Neale (1966–1970)
1966–67	Independent	-	-	-	-	-	-	-	-	-	20	10	10	0	.500		
1967–68	Independent	-	-	-	-	-	-	-	-	-	24	9	13	2	.417		
1968–69	Independent	-	-	-	-	-	-	-	-	-	29	11	18	0	.379		
1969–70	Independent	-	-	-	-	-	-	-	-	-	27	19	7	1	.722		
Dave Chambers (1970–1972)
1970–71	Independent	-	-	-	-	-	-	-	-	-	29	20	9	0	.690		
1971–72	CCHA	12	8	4	0	-	-	-	16	1st	29	24	5	0	.828	Won Semifinal, 7–1 (Ohio); Won Championship, 3–0 (Saint Louis)	
Gerald Walford (1972–1975)
1972–73	CCHA	14	7	7	0	-	-	-	14	3rd	30	18	11	1	.617	Lost Round Robin, 4–11 (Saint Louis); Lost CCHA Round Robin, 1–8 (Bowling Green)	
Division I
1973–74	Independent	-	-	-	-	-	-	-	-	-	31	16	13	2	.548		
1974–75	Independent	-	-	-	-	-	-	-	-	-	30	7	22	1	.250		
Jerry Welsh (1975–1995)
1975–76	CCHA	16	3	13	0	-	-	-	6	5th	34	18	15	1	.544		
1976–77	CCHA	16	8	7	1	-	-	-	17	3rd	38	17	20	1	.461	Lost Semifinal series, 3–9 (Bowling Green)	
1977–78	CCHA	20	9	11	0	-	-	-	18	T–3rd	35	16	18	1	.471	Lost Semifinal series, 3–7 (Bowling Green)	
1978–79	CCHA	24	15	8	1	-	-	-	31	2nd	40	25	13	2	.650	Won Semifinal series, 10–9 (Northern Michigan); Lost Championship series, 7–11 (Bowling Green)	
1979–80	CCHA	20	14	5	1	-	-	-	29	2nd	38	25	10	3	.697	Lost Semifinal series, 8–12 (Ferris State)	
1980–81	CCHA	22	15	6	1	-	-	-	31	2nd	39	24	12	3	.654	Won Semifinal series, 8–6 (Ferris State); Lost Championship series, 4–6 (Northern Michigan)	
1981–82	CCHA	28	10	17	1	-	-	-	21	10th	34	16	17	1	.485		
1982–83	CCHA	32	21	7	4	-	-	-	46	T–2nd	40	26	9	5	.713	Won Quarterfinal series, 10–8 (Miami); Lost Semifinal, 3–8 (Michigan State); Won Consolation Game, 8–6 (Northern Michigan)	
1983–84	CCHA	28	21	9	0	-	-	-	.700	T–2nd	41	30	10	1	.744	Won Quarterfinal series, 11–3 (Ferris State); Lost Semifinal, 1–8 (Michigan State); Won Consolation Game, 3–2 (OT) (Bowling Green)	
1984–85	CCHA	32	13	17	2	-	-	-	28	6th	41	19	20	2	.488	Won Quarterfinal series, 8–7 (Western Michigan); Lost Semifinal, 0–8 (Michigan State); Won Consolation Game, 7–3 (Bowling Green)	
1985–86	CCHA	32	16	15	1	-	-	-	33	5th	43	23	19	1	.547	Lost Quarterfinal series, 1–2 (Lake Superior State)	
1986–87	CCHA	32	12	19	1	-	-	-	25	6th	43	19	23	1	.453	Won Quarterfinal series, 2–1 (Lake Superior State); Lost Semifinal, 3–5 (Bowling Green); Won Consolation Game, 7–4 (Western Michigan)	
1987–88	CCHA	32	7	21	4	-	-	-	18	8th	40	10	24	6	.325	Lost Quarterfinal series, 0–2 (Lake Superior State)	
1988–89	CCHA	32	7	20	5	-	-	-	19	8th	40	9	26	5	.288	Lost Quarterfinal series, 0–2 (Michigan State)	
1989–90	CCHA	32	11	17	4	-	-	-	26	T–5th	40	11	24	5	.338	Lost Quarterfinal series, 0–2 (Bowling Green)	
1990–91	CCHA	32	9	19	4	-	-	-	22	7th	40	11	25	4	.325	Lost Quarterfinal series, 0–2 (Michigan)	
1991–92	CCHA	32	8	19	5	-	-	-	21	8th	38	12	21	5	.382	Lost Quarterfinal series, 0–2 (Michigan)	
1992–93	CCHA	30	3	25	2	-	-	-	8	11th	35	5	30	2	.162	Lost Quarterfinal series, 0–2 (Miami)	
1993–94	CCHA	30	6	19	5	-	-	-	17	10th	35	7	23	5	.271	Lost Quarterfinal series, 0–2 (Lake Superior State)	
John Markell (1995–2010)
1994–95	CCHA	27	3	22	3	-	-	-	8	10th	38	7†	29†	1†	.203	Won Play-In, 7–2 (Alaska–Fairbanks); Lost Quarterfinal series, 0–2 (Michigan)	
1995–96	CCHA	30	8	17	5	-	-	-	21	8th	34	10	19	5	.646	Lost Quarterfinal series, 0–2 (Lake Superior State)	
1996–97	CCHA	27	9	16	2	-	-	-	20	7th	39	12	25	2	.333	Lost Quarterfinal series, 0–2 (Miami)	
1997–98	CCHA	30	19	10	1	-	-	-	39	3rd	42	27	13	2	.667	Won Quarterfinal series, 2–0 (Lake Superior State); Won Semifinal, 4–2 (Michigan); Lost Championship, 2–3 (2OT) (Michigan State)	Won Regional Quarterfinal, 4–0 (Yale); Won regional semifinal, 4–3 (OT) (Michigan State); Lost National semifinal, 2–5 (Boston College)
1998–99	CCHA	30	17	10	3	-	-	-	37	3rd	41	21	16	4	.561	Won Quarterfinal series, 2–0 (Ferris State); Lost Semifinal, 2–3 (Michigan)	Lost Regional Quarterfinal, 2–4 (Maine)
1999–00	CCHA	28	9	16	3	-	-	-	21	11th	36	13	19	4	.417		
2000–01	CCHA	28	13	13	2	-	-	-	28	7th	37	17	18	2	.486	Lost Quarterfinal series, 1–2 (Nebraska–Omaha)	
2001–02	CCHA	28	12	12	4	-	-	-	28	T–7th	40	20	16	4	.550	Won Quarterfinal series, 2–0 (Western Michigan); Won Quarterfinal, 6–5 (OT) (Alaska–Fairbanks); Lost Semifinal, 1–2 (Michigan)	
2002–03	CCHA	28	16	8	4	-	-	-	36	3rd	43	25	13	5	.640	Won Quarterfinal series, 2–0 (Nebraska–Omaha); Won Quarterfinal, 3–2 (OT) (Notre Dame); Lost Semifinal, 0–3 (Michigan); Lost Third-place game, 1–4 (Northern Michigan)	Lost Regional semifinal, 0–1 (Boston College)
2003–04	CCHA	28	16	12	0	-	-	-	32	4th	42	26	16	0	.619	Won First round series, 2–0 (Bowling Green); Won Quarterfinal, 6–5 (OT) (Notre Dame); Won Semifinal, 4–3 (OT) (Miami); Won Championship, 4–2 (Michigan)	Lost Regional semifinal, 0–1 (OT) (Wisconsin)
2004–05	CCHA	28	21	5	2	-	-	-	44	2nd	42	27	11	4	.690	Won First round series, 2–1 (Ferris State); Won Semifinal, 4–1 (OT) (Michigan State); Lost Championship, 2–4 (Michigan)	Lost Regional semifinal, 2–3 (Cornell)
2005–06	CCHA	28	11	14	3	-	-	-	25	10th	39	15	19	5	.449	Lost First round series, 0–2 (Ferris State)	
2006–07	CCHA	28	12	12	4	-	-	-	28	7th	37	15	17	5	.473	Lost First round series, 1–2 (Northern Michigan)	
2007–08	CCHA	28	7	18	3	-	-	-	17	11th	41	12	25	4	.341	Lost First round series, 1–2 (Northern Michigan)	
2008–09	CCHA	28	13	11	4	-	-	3	33	5th	42	23	15	4	.595	Won CCHA First round series, 2–0 (Bowling Green); Lost Quarterfinal series, 1–2 (Alaska)	Lost Regional semifinal, 3–8 (Boston University)
2009–10	CCHA	28	10	12	6	-	-	4	40	8th	39	15	18	6	.462	Won CCHA First round series, 2–0 (Notre Dame); Lost Quarterfinal series, 1–2 (Miami)	
Mark Osiecki (2010–2013)
2010–11	CCHA	28	10	14	4	-	-	2	36	9th	37	15	18	4	.459	Lost First round series, 0–2 (Lake Superior State)	
2011–12	CCHA	28	11	12	5	-	-	1	39	T–8th	35	15	15	5	.500	Lost First round series, 0–2 (Notre Dame)	
2012–13	CCHA	28	13	10	5	-	-	1	45	4th	40	16	17	7	.488	Won Quarterfinal series, 2–1 (Ferris State); Lost Semifinal, 1–3 (Notre Dame)	
Steve Rohlik (2013–Present)
2013–14	Big Ten	20	6	9	5	-	-	4	27	4th	37	18	14	5	.554	Won Quarterfinal, 2–1 (OT) (Michigan State); Won Semifinal, 3–1 (Minnesota); Lost Championship, 4–5 (OT) (Wisconsin)	
2014–15	Big Ten	20	8	11	1	-	-	0	26	5th	36	14	19	3	.431	Won Quarterfinal, 3–1 (Penn State); Lost Semifinal, 0–3 (Minnesota)	
2015–16	Big Ten	20	8	8	4	-	-	1	29	4th	36	14	18	4	.444	Won Quarterfinal, 4–3 (OT) (Michigan State); Lost Semifinal, 2–4 (Minnesota)	
2016–17	Big Ten	20	11	8	1	-	-	1	35	3rd	39	21	12	2	.629	Won Quarterfinal, 6–3 (Michigan State); Lost Semifinal, 1–2 (Wisconsin)	Lost Regional semifinal, 2–3 (OT) (Minnesota–Duluth)
2017–18	Big Ten	24	14	8	2	-	-	1	45	2nd	41	26	10	5	.695	Won Quarterfinal series, 2–0 (Michigan State); Won Semifinal, 3–2 (OT) (Michigan); Lost Championship, 2–3 (OT) (Notre Dame)	Won Regional semifinal, 4–2 (Princeton); Won Regional Final, 5–1 (Denver); Lost National semifinal, 1–2 (Minnesota–Duluth)
2018–19	Big Ten	24	13	7	4	-	-	3	46	1st	36	20	11	5	.625	Lost Semifinal, 1–5 (Penn State)	Lost Regional semifinal, 0–2 (Denver)
2019–20	Big Ten	24	11	9	4	-	-	1	38	T–2nd	36	20	11	5	.625	Won Quarterfinal series, 2–0 (Wisconsin); Tournament Cancelled	
2020–21	Big Ten	22	6	16	0	0	2	0	20	6th	27	7	19	1	.278	Lost Quarterfinal, 0–4 (Michigan)	
2021–22	Big Ten	22	13	9	2	1	1	1	42	4th	37	22	13	2	.622	Lost Quarterfinal series, 1–2 (Penn State)	
2022–23	Big Ten	22	11	11	2	0	0	1	36	3rd	40	21	16	3	.564	Won Quarterfinal series, 2–1 (Penn State); Lost Semifinal, 3–7 (Michigan)	Won Regional semifinal, 8–1 (Harvard); Lost Regional Final, 1–4 (Quinnipiac)
2023–24	Big Ten	24	4	18	2	1	0	2	15	7th	38	14	20	4	.421	Won Quarterfinal series, 2–1 (Wisconsin); Lost Semifinal, 1–2 (Michigan State)	
2024–25	Big Ten	22	14	9	1	3	2	0	42	3rd	40	24	14	2	.625	Won Quarterfinal series, 2–1 (Wisconsin); Won Semifinal, 4–3 (OT) (Penn State); Lost Championship, 3–4 (2OT) (Michigan State)	Lost Regional semifinal, 3–8 (Boston University)
Totals											GP	W	L	T	%	Championships	
Regular Season											2049	957	906	176	.513	1 CCHA Championship, 1 Big Ten Championship	
Conference Post-season											143	62	77	4	.448	2 CCHA tournament championships	
NCAA Post-season											16	5	11	0	.313	11 NCAA Tournament appearances	
Regular Season and Post-season Record											2208	1024	1004	180	.505		

* Winning percentage is used when conference schedules are unbalanced.
† Jerry Welsh resigned in February after being told his contract would not be renewed.
