= 2008–09 Notre Dame Fighting Irish men's ice hockey season =

CCHA Tournament Champions CCHA regular season champions NCAA regional semifinal, L 1–5 vs. Bemidji State
- Conference: 1st CCHA
- Home ice: Joyce Center

Rankings
- USA Today/USA Hockey Magazine: #4
- USCHO.com/CBS College Sports: #2

Record
- Overall: 31–6–3
- Home: 13–3–2
- Road: 14–2–1
- Neutral: 4–1–0

Coaches and captains
- Head coach: Jeff Jackson
- Captain: Erik Condra
- Alternate captain(s): Christian Hanson; Kyle Lawson; Ryan Thang

The 2008–09 Notre Dame Fighting Irish men's ice hockey team represented the University of Notre Dame in the 2008–09 NCAA Division I men's ice hockey season. Their regular season began on October 11, 2008, against Denver and concluded on February 28, 2009, against Michigan State Spartans. Note Dame finished first in the Central Collegiate Hockey Association and advanced to the 2009 CCHA men's ice hockey tournament where they defeated Michigan 5–2 in the championship game. Notre Dame was given the top seed in Midwest Region and second seed overall for the 2009 NCAA Division I men's ice hockey tournament. In the opening game of the tournament, the Fighting Irish lost 5–1 to Bemidji State. They played their home games at the Edmund P. Joyce Center, and were coached by Jeff Jackson. Notre Dame's assistant coaches included Paul Pooley, Andy Slaggert, and Mike McNeill. Their athletic director was Jack Swarbrick. Games were broadcast over the radio on local ESPN Radio (AM1580), and were reported on by local newspaper the South Bend Tribune and Notre Dame's student newspaper The Observer.

== Rankings ==
| Poll | Pre | Wk 1 | Wk 2 | Wk 3 | Wk 4 | Wk 5 | Wk 6 | Wk 7 | Wk 8 | Wk 9 | Wk 10 | Wk 11 | Wk 12 | Wk 13 | Wk 14 | Wk 15 | Wk 16 | Wk 17 | Wk 18 | Wk 19 | Wk 20 | Wk 21 | Wk 22 | Wk 23 | Wk 24 | Final |
|---|---|---|---|---|---|---|---|---|---|---|---|---|---|---|---|---|---|---|---|---|---|---|---|---|---|---|
| USA Today | 3 | 4 | 8 | 8 | 13 | 12 | 9 | 6 | 2 | 1 | 1 | 1 | 1 | 1 | 1 | 1 | 2 | 3 | 2 | 1 | 2 | 2 | 2 | 2 | 2 | 4 |
| USCHO.com | – | 4 | 8 | 8 | 13 | 12 | 9 | 5 | 2 | 1 | 1 | 1 | 1 | 1 | 1 | 1 | 2 | 2 | 2 | 2 | 2 | 2 | 1 | – | – | 2 |

== Standings ==
2008–09 Central Collegiate Hockey Association standings
| | Conference | | | | | | | | Overall | | | | | |
| | GP | W | L | T | SW | PTS | GF | GA | GP | W | L | T | GF | GA |
|---|---|---|---|---|---|---|---|---|---|---|---|---|---|---|
| #4 Notre Dame†* | 28 | 21 | 4 | 3 | 3 | 48 | 95 | 52 | 40 | 31 | 6 | 3 | 135 | 69 |
| #5 Michigan | 28 | 20 | 8 | 0 | 0 | 40 | 98 | 51 | 41 | 29 | 12 | 0 | 145 | 84 |
| #2 Miami | 28 | 17 | 7 | 4 | 2 | 40 | 89 | 57 | 41 | 23 | 13 | 5 | 128 | 89 |
| Alaska | 28 | 0^ | 28^ | 0^ | 0^ | 34 | 54 | 51 | 39 | 0^ | 39^ | 0^ | 74 | 68 |
| Ohio State | 28 | 13 | 11 | 4 | 3 | 33 | 87 | 85 | 42 | 23 | 15 | 4 | 143 | 119 |
| Northern Michigan | 28 | 11 | 12 | 5 | 3 | 30 | 72 | 73 | 41 | 19 | 17 | 5 | 111 | 103 |
| Western Michigan | 28 | 9 | 13 | 6 | 2 | 26 | 75 | 86 | 41 | 14 | 20 | 7 | 111 | 130 |
| Nebraska–Omaha | 28 | 8 | 13 | 7 | 3 | 26 | 62 | 76 | 40 | 15 | 17 | 8 | 98 | 103 |
| Ferris State | 28 | 9 | 14 | 5 | 2 | 25 | 58 | 68 | 38 | 12 | 19 | 7 | 90 | 105 |
| Lake Superior State | 28 | 7 | 15 | 6 | 1 | 21 | 73 | 86 | 39 | 11 | 20 | 8 | 110 | 115 |
| Michigan State | 28 | 7 | 17 | 4 | 3 | 21 | 43 | 85 | 38 | 10 | 23 | 5 | 62 | 118 |
| Bowling Green | 28 | 8 | 19 | 1 | 0 | 17 | 60 | 96 | 38 | 11 | 24 | 3 | 89 | 131 |
Championship: Notre Dame † indicates conference regular season champion * indicates conference tournament champion Final rankings: USA Today/USA Hockey Magazine Top 15 Poll^ Alaska was retroactively required to forfeit all wins and ties due to player ineligibilities.

== Schedule and results ==
- Green background indicates shootout/overtime win (conference only) or win (2 points).
- Red background indicates regulation loss (0 points).
- White background indicates overtime/shootout loss (conference only) or tie (1 point).

2008–09 Game Log

October: 3–3–0 (Home: 2–2–0; Road: 1–1–0)
| # | Date | Visitor | Score | Home | OT | Decision | Attendance | CCHA | Overall |
|---|---|---|---|---|---|---|---|---|---|
| 1†* | October 11 | Notre Dame | 2–5 | Denver | | Pearce | 6,066 | 0–0–0–0 | 0–1–0 |
| 2† | October 17 | Sacred Heart | 0–3 | Notre Dame | | Pearce | 2,256 | 0–0–0–0 | 1–1–0 |
| 3† | October 18 | Sacred Heart | 0–7 | Notre Dame | | O'Brien | 2,171 | 0–0–0–0 | 2–1–0 |
| 4 | October 24 | Miami (OH) | 2–0 | Notre Dame | | Pearce | 2,192 | 0–1–0–0 | 2–2–0 |
| 5 | October 25 | Miami (OH) | 3–2 | Notre Dame | | Pearce | 2,433 | 0–2–0–0 | 2–3–0 |
| 6 | October 31 | Notre Dame | 3–2 | Northern Michigan | | Pearce | 2,883 | 1–2–0–0 | 3–3–0 |

November: 7–0–2 (Home: 3–0–2; Road: 4–0–0)
| # | Date | Visitor | Score | Home | OT | Decision | Attendance | CCHA | Overall |
|---|---|---|---|---|---|---|---|---|---|
| 7 | November 1 | Notre Dame | 4–2 | Northern Michigan | | Pearce | 3,756 | 2–2–0–0 | 4–3–0 |
| 8† | November 7 | Notre Dame | 4–1 | Boston College | | Pearce | 7,884 | 2–2–0–0 | 5–3–0 |
| 9† | November 8 | Notre Dame | 4–1 | Providence | | Pearce | 2,003 | 2–2–0–0 | 6–3–0 |
| 10 | November 14 | Lake Superior State | 3–3 | Notre Dame | SOW | Pearce | 2,733 | 2–2–1–1 | 6–3–1 |
| 11 | November 15 | Lake Superior State | 2–5 | Notre Dame | | Pearce | 2,732 | 3–2–1–1 | 7–3–1 |
| 12 | November 21 | Bowling Green | 1–5 | Notre Dame | | Pearce | 2,857 | 4–2–1–1 | 8–3–1 |
| 13 | November 22 | Notre Dame | 9–1 | Bowling Green | | Pearce | 3,422 | 5–2–1–1 | 9–3–1 |
| 14 | November 28 | Western Michigan | 1–4 | Notre Dame | | Pearce | 2,857 | 6–2–1–1 | 10–3–1 |
| 15 | November 29 | Western Michigan | 3–3 | Notre Dame | SOW | Pearce | 2,571 | 6–2–2–2 | 10–3–2 |

December: 4–0–0 (Home: 1–0–0; Road: 3–0–0)
| # | Date | Visitor | Score | Home | OT | Decision | Attendance | CCHA | Overall |
|---|---|---|---|---|---|---|---|---|---|
| 16 | December 5 | Notre Dame | 3–1 | Ferris State | | Pearce | 1,396 | 7–2–2–2 | 11–3–2 |
| 17 | December 6 | Notre Dame | 1–0 | Ferris State | | Pearce | 1,543 | 8–2–2–2 | 12–3–2 |
| 18 | December 12 | Notre Dame | 3–1 | Bowling Green | | Pearce | 3,113 | 9–2–2–2 | 13–3–2 |
| 19 | December 13 | Bowling Green | 3–4 | Notre Dame | | Pearce | 2,857 | 10–2–2–2 | 14–3–2 |

January: 6–1–1 (Home: 2–1–0; Road: 2–0–1; Neutral: 2–0–0)
| # | Date | Visitor | Score | Home | OT | Decision | Attendance | CCHA | Overall |
|---|---|---|---|---|---|---|---|---|---|
| 20†^ | January 2 | Union | 1–3 | Notre Dame | | Pearce | 2,428 | 10–2–2–2 | 15–3–2 |
| 21†^ | January 3 | Minnesota-Duluth | 1–3 | Notre Dame | | Pearce | 3,229 | 10–2–2–2 | 16–3–2 |
| 22 | January 9 | Alaska | 0–2 | Notre Dame | | Pearce | 2,857 | 11–2–2–2 | 17–3–2 |
| 23 | January 10 | Alaska | 0–3 | Notre Dame | | Pearce | 2,857 | 12–2–2–2 | 18–3–2 |
| 24 | January 16 | Notre Dame | 3–2 | Lake Superior State | | Pearce | 2,598 | 13–2–2–2 | 19–3–2 |
| 25 | January 17 | Notre Dame | 3–3 | Lake Superior State | SOW | Pearce | 2,468 | 13–2–3–3 | 19–3–3 |
| 26 | January 30 | Michigan | 2–1 | Notre Dame | | Pearce | 3,007 | 13–3–3–3 | 19–4–3 |
| 27 | January 31 | Notre Dame | 3–2 | Michigan | | Pearce | 6,983 | 14–3–3–3 | 20–4–3 |

February: 7–1–0 (Home: 3–0–0; Road: 4–1–0)
| # | Date | Visitor | Score | Home | OT | Decision | Attendance | CCHA | Overall |
|---|---|---|---|---|---|---|---|---|---|
| 28 | February 6 | Notre Dame | 4–3 | Ohio State | OT | Pearce | 6,571 | 15–3–3–3 | 21–4–3 |
| 29 | February 8 | Notre Dame | 1–4 | Ohio State | | Pearce | 6,031 | 15–4–3–3 | 21–5–3 |
| 30 | February 13 | Northern Michigan | 5–9 | Notre Dame | | Pearce | 2,882 | 16–4–3–3 | 22–5–3 |
| 31 | February 14 | Northern Michigan | 2–5 | Notre Dame | | Pearce | 2,857 | 17–4–3–3 | 23–5–3 |
| 32 | February 20 | Notre Dame | 4–3 | Nebraska-Omaha | OT | Pearce | 7,367 | 18–4–3–3 | 24–5–3 |
| 33 | February 21 | Notre Dame | 1–0 | Nebraska-Omaha | | Pearce | 7,991 | 19–4–3–3 | 25–5–3 |
| 34 | February 27 | Michigan State | 0–5 | Notre Dame | | Pearce | 2,857 | 20–4–3–3 | 26–5–3 |
| 35 | February 28 | Notre Dame | 2–1 | Michigan State | | Pearce | 6,759 | 21–4–3–3 | 27–5–3 |

March: 4–1–0 (Home: 2–0–0; Road: 0–0–0; Neutral: 2–1–0)
| # | Date | Visitor | Score | Home | OT | Decision | Attendance | CCHA | Overall |
|---|---|---|---|---|---|---|---|---|---|
| 36†° | March 13 | Nebraska-Omaha | 0–5 | Notre Dame | | Pearce | 2,819 | 21–4–3–3 | 28–5–3 |
| 37†° | March 14 | Nebraska-Omaha | 0–1 | Notre Dame | | Pearce | 2,857 | 21–4–3–3 | 29–5–3 |
| 38†" | March 20 | Northern Michigan | 1–2 | Notre Dame | | Pearce | 11,043 | 21–4–3–3 | 30–5–3 |
| 39†× | March 21 | Michigan | 2–5 | Notre Dame | | Pearce | 19,126 | 21–4–3–3 | 31–5–3 |
| 40†± | March 21 | Bemidji State | 5–1 | Notre Dame | | Pearce | 4,052 | 21–4–3–3 | 31–6–3 |

† Denotes a non-conference game

* Denotes US Hockey Hall of Fame Game

^ Denotes Shillelagh Tournament (neutral site: Sears Centre, Hoffman Estates, Illinois)

° Denotes 2009 CCHA men's ice hockey tournament quarterfinals

" Denotes 2009 CCHA men's ice hockey tournament semifinals (neutral site: Joe Louis Arena, Detroit, Michigan)

× Denotes 2009 CCHA men's ice hockey tournament final (neutral site: Joe Louis Arena, Detroit, Michigan)

± Denotes 2009 NCAA Division I men's ice hockey tournament regional semifinal (neutral site: Van Andel Arena, Grand Rapids, Michigan)

== Player statistics ==
=== Skaters ===
Note: GP = Games played; G = Goals; A = Assists; Pts = Points; +/- = Plus–minus; PIM = Penalty minutes

| Player | GP | G | A | Pts | PIM |
|---|---|---|---|---|---|
| Erik Condra | 40 | 13 | 25 | 38 | 0 |
| Calle Ridderwall | 40 | 17 | 15 | 32 | 20 |
| Christian Hanson | 37 | 16 | 15 | 31 | 0 |
| Kevin Deeth | 40 | 4 | 27 | 31 | 0 |
| Billy Maday | 39 | 16 | 14 | 30 | 28 |
| Ben Ryan | 39 | 12 | 15 | 27 | 34 |
| Ian Cole | 38 | 6 | 20 | 26 | 62 |
| Brett Blatchford | 40 | 0 | 25 | 25 | 30 |
| Kyle Lawson | 40 | 4 | 19 | 23 | 0 |
| Ryan Thang | 33 | 10 | 9 | 19 | 0 |
| Garrett Regan | 40 | 7 | 11 | 18 | 0 |
| Dan Kissel | 37 | 6 | 11 | 17 | 14 |
| Christiaan Minella | 38 | 9 | 7 | 16 | 32 |
| Justin White | 38 | 9 | 6 | 15 | 14 |
| Ryan Guentzel | 40 | 4 | 7 | 11 | 20 |
| Ted Ruth | 36 | 2 | 5 | 7 | 48 |
| Sean Lorenz | 40 | 0 | 3 | 3 | 18 |
| Patrick Gaul | 15 | 0 | 2 | 2 | 6 |
| Luke Lucyk | 38 | 0 | 2 | 2 | 0 |
| Richard Ryan | 3 | 0 | 0 | 0 | 0 |
| Nick Condon | 3 | 0 | 0 | 0 | 2 |
| Eric Ringel | 6 | 0 | 0 | 0 | 0 |

=== Goaltenders ===
Note: GP = Games played; TOI = Time on ice; W = Wins; L = Losses; T = Ties; GA = Goals against; SO = Shutouts; SV% = Save percentage; GAA = Goals against average; G = Goals; A = Assists; PIM = Penalty minutes

| Player | GP | TOI | W | L | T | GA | SO | Sv% | GAA | G | A | PIM |
|---|---|---|---|---|---|---|---|---|---|---|---|---|
| Jordan Pearce | 39 | 2326 | 30 | 6 | 3 | 65 | 8 | .931 | 1.68 | 0 | 2 | 0 |
| Tom O'Brien | 2 | 81 | 1 | 0 | 0 | 2 | 1 | .920 | 1.47 | 0 | 0 | 0 |
