= 2008–09 Michigan Wolverines men's ice hockey season =

- Conference: 2nd CCHA
- Home ice: Yost Ice Arena

Rankings
- USA Today/USA Hockey Magazine: #3
- USCHO.com/CBS College Sports: #3

Record
- Overall: 28–10–0
- Home: 16–3–0
- Road: 9–7–0
- Neutral: 3–0–0

Coaches and captains
- Head coach: Red Berenson
- Captain: Mark Mitera
- Alternate captain: Chris Summers

The 2008–09 Michigan Wolverines men's ice hockey team is the Wolverines' 87th season. They represent the University of Michigan in the 2008–09 NCAA Division I men's ice hockey season. The team, which plays their home games at Yost Ice Arena, was coached by Red Berenson that season.

== Season events ==
2008 Exhibition Game Log: 2–0–0 (Home: 2–0–0; Road: 0–0–0)
#	Date	Visitor	Score	Home	OT	Decision	Attendance	Record	Recap
1	October 4	U.S. National Team Development Program	1–4	Michigan		Sauer	5,817	1–0–0
2	October 5	Waterloo	1–3	Michigan		Hogan	—	2–0–0

== Regular season ==
=== Standings ===
2008–09 Central Collegiate Hockey Association standings
	Conference								Overall					
	GP	W	L	T	SW	PTS	GF	GA	GP	W	L	T	GF	GA
#4 Notre Dame†*	28	21	4	3	3	48	95	52	40	31	6	3	135	69
#5 Michigan	28	20	8	0	0	40	98	51	41	29	12	0	145	84
#2 Miami	28	17	7	4	2	40	89	57	41	23	13	5	128	89
Alaska	28	0^	28^	0^	0^	34	54	51	39	0^	39^	0^	74	68
Ohio State	28	13	11	4	3	33	87	85	42	23	15	4	143	119
Northern Michigan	28	11	12	5	3	30	72	73	41	19	17	5	111	103
Western Michigan	28	9	13	6	2	26	75	86	41	14	20	7	111	130
Nebraska–Omaha	28	8	13	7	3	26	62	76	40	15	17	8	98	103
Ferris State	28	9	14	5	2	25	58	68	38	12	19	7	90	105
Lake Superior State	28	7	15	6	1	21	73	86	39	11	20	8	110	115
Michigan State	28	7	17	4	3	21	43	85	38	10	23	5	62	118
Bowling Green	28	8	19	1	0	17	60	96	38	11	24	3	89	131
Championship: Notre Dame † indicates conference regular season champion * indicates conference tournament champion Final rankings: USA Today/USA Hockey Magazine Top 15 Poll^ Alaska was retroactively required to forfeit all wins and ties due to player ineligibilities.

=== Schedule and results ===
- Green background indicates shootout/overtime win (conference only) or win (2 points).
- Red background indicates regulation loss (0 points).
- White background indicates overtime/shootout loss (conference only) or tie (1 point).

Record is as follows:
Win–loss–tie-SOW

2008–09 Game Log

October: 5–2–0 (Home: 4–0–0; Road: 1–2–0)
#	Date	Visitor	Score	Home	OT	Decision	Attendance	CCHA	Overall	Recap
1†	October 10	St. Lawrence	3–4	Michigan		Saurer	6,241	0–0–0–0	1–0–0
2†	October 11	St. Lawrence	3–5	Michigan		Hogan	6,211	0–0–0–0	2–0–0
3	October 17	Michigan	0–2	Northern Michigan		Sauer	3,842	0–1–0–0	2–1–0
4	October 18	Michigan	5–3	Northern Michigan		Hogan	4,180	1–1–0–0	3–1–0
5†	October 23	Niagara	2–4	Michigan		Hogan	6,004	1–1–0–0	4–1–0
6†	October 25	Michigan	2–7	Boston University		Sauer	6,200	1–1–0–0	4–2–0
7	October 31	Ohio State	3–4	Michigan		Sauer	6,328	2–1–0–0	5–2–0

November: 4–5–0 (Home: 1–1–0; Road: 3–4–0)
#	Date	Visitor	Score	Home	OT	Decision	Attendance	CCHA	Overall	Recap
8	November 1	Ohio State	1–6	Michigan		Hogan	6,889	3–1–0–0	6–2–0
9	November 7	Michigan	1–4	Alaska		Sauer	3,137	3–2–0–0	6–3–0
10	November 8	Michigan	3–2	Alaska		Hogan	3,598	4–2–0–0	7–3–0
11	November 14	Western Michigan	2–1	Michigan		Sauer	6,852	4–3–0–0	7–4–0
12	November 15	Michigan	5–0	Western Michigan		Hogan	4,295	5–3–0–0	8–4–0
13	November 21	Michigan	0–2	Miami (OH)		Sauer	3,642	5–4–0–0	8–5–0
14	November 22	Michigan	1–2	Miami (OH)		Hogan	3,025	5–5–0–0	8–6–0
15†*	November 28	Michigan	6–3	Minnesota		Hogan	10,217	5–5–0–0	9–6–0
16†*	November 29	Michigan	0–3	Wisconsin		Sauer	14,025	5–5–0–0	9–7–0

December: 4–0–0 (Home: 1–0–0; Road: 1–0–0; Neutral: 2–0–0)
#	Date	Visitor	Score	Home	OT	Decision	Attendance	CCHA	Overall	Recap
17	December 5	Michigan State	1–6	Michigan		Hogan	6,934	6–5–0–0	10–7–0
18	December 6	Michigan	5–3	Michigan State		Hogan	6,525	7–5–0–0	11–7–0
19†^	December 27	Michigan Tech	0–5	Michigan		Hogan	13,017	7–5–0–0	12–7–0
20†^	December 28	Michigan State	1–5	Michigan		Hogan	12,634	7–5–0–0	13–7–0

January: 6–2–0 (Home: 3–2–0; Road: 2–0–0; Neutral: 1–0–0)
#	Date	Visitor	Score	Home	OT	Decision	Attendance	CCHA	Overall	Recap
21	January 10	Miami (OH)	1–5	Michigan		Hogan	6,852	8–5–0–0	14–7–0
22	January 11	Miami (OH)	0–4	Michigan		Hogan	6,714	9–5–0–0	15–7–0
23	January 16	Bowling Green	3–0	Michigan		Hogan	6,815	9–6–0–0	15–8–0
24	January 17	Michigan	1–0	Bowling Green		Sauer	4,017	10–6–0–0	16–8–0
25‡	January 23	Michigan State	2–6	Michigan		Hogan	12,981	11–6–0–0	17–8–0
26	January 24	Michigan State	3–5	Michigan		Hogan	6,845	12–6–0–0	18–8–0
27	January 30	Michigan	2–1	Notre Dame		Hogan	3,007	13–6–0–0	19–8–0
28	January 31	Notre Dame	3–2	Michigan		Hogan	6,983	13–7–0–0	19–9–0

February: 7–1–0 (Home: 5–0–0; Road: 2–1–0)
#	Date	Visitor	Score	Home	OT	Decision	Attendance	CCHA	Overall	Recap
29	February 6	Lake Superior State	2–6	Michigan		Hogan	6,847	14–7–0–0	20–9–0
30	February 7	Lake Superior State	1–2	Michigan		Hogan	6,887	15–7–0–0	21–9–0
31	February 13	Nebraska-Omaha	3–8	Michigan		Hogan	6,781	16–7–0–0	22–9–0
32	February 14	Nebraska-Omaha	2–4	Michigan		Sauer	6,837	17–7–0–0	23–9–0
33	February 20	Michigan	4–1	Ohio State		Hogan	9,267	18–7–0–0	24–9–0
34	February 21	Michigan	2–3	Ohio State		Hogan	8,390	18–8–0–0	24–10–0
35	February 27	Michigan	6–1	Ferris State		Hogan	2,943	19–8–0–0	25–10–0
36	February 28	Ferris State	0–4	Michigan		Sauer	6,819	20–8–0–0	26–10–0

March: 2–0–0 (Home: 2–0–0; Road: 0–0–0)
#	Date	Visitor	Score	Home	OT	Decision	Attendance	CCHA	Overall	Recap
37†°	March 13	Western Michigan	2–5	Michigan		Hogan	6,832	20–8–0–0	27–10–0
38†°	March 14	Western Michigan	1–6	Michigan		Hogan	6,887	20–8–0–0	28–10–0
39†”	March 14	Alaska		Michigan

† Denotes a non-conference game

* Denotes College Hockey Showcase

^ Denotes Great Lakes Invitational (neutral site: Joe Louis Arena, Detroit, Michigan)

‡ Denotes neutral site (Joe Louis Arena, Detroit, Michigan)

° Denotes 2009 CCHA Men's Ice Hockey Tournament quarterfinals

” Denotes 2009 CCHA Men's Ice Hockey Tournament semifinals

== Player stats ==
=== Skaters ===
Note: GP = Games played; G = Goals; A = Assists; Pts = Points; +/- = Plus–minus; PIM = Penalty minutes

Player	GP	G	A	Pts	PIM
Aaron Palushaj	30	10	30	40	20
Louie Caporusso	32	22	15	37	28
David Wohlberg	32	12	13	25	47
Carl Hagelin	32	10	13	23	26
Travis Turnbull	32	8	15	23	30
Matt Rust	28	7	8	16	31
Chris Summers	32	4	12	16	0
Chad Langlais	32	2	14	16	38
Brian Lebler	29	6	7	13	53
Brandon Burlon	24	5	8	13	10
Robbie Czarnik	32	3	10	13	28
Tim Miller	32	6	6	12	0
Brandon Naurato	18	5	4	9	32
Luke Glendening	26	5	4	9	21
Ben Winnett	27	3	6	9	16
Danny Fardig	24	2	5	7	8
Steve Kampfer	16	1	6	7	0
Greg Pateryn	27	0	5	5	34
Scooter Vaughan	22	0	4	4	29
Tristin Llewellyn	31	1	2	3	84
Anthony Ciraulo	9	1	1	2	0
Eric Elmblad	8	0	1	1	2
Mark Mitera	1	0	0	0	0

=== Goaltenders ===
Note: GP = Games played; TOI = Time on ice; W = Wins; L = Losses; T = Ties; GA = Goals against; SO = Shutouts; SV% = Save percentage; GAA = Goals against average; G = Goals; A = Assists; PIM = Penalty minutes

Player	GP	TOI	W	L	T	GA	SO	Sv%	GAA	G	A	PIM
Bryan Hogan	23	1328	19	3	0	43	3	.915	1.94	0	0	0
Billy Sauer	11	582	4	6	0	22	1	.915	2.27	0	0	0

== See also ==
- 2008 Michigan Wolverines football team
- 2008–09 Michigan Wolverines men's basketball team
