= 2010 CCHA men's ice hockey tournament =

2010 CCHA Men's ice hockey tournament
- Dates: March 5–20, 2010
- Teams: 12
- Finals site: Joe Louis Arena; Detroit, Michigan
- Champions: Michigan (9th title)
- Winning coach: Red Berenson (9th title)
- MVP: Shawn Hunwick (Michigan)
- CCHA Men's Ice Hockey Tournaments

The 2010 CCHA Men's Ice Hockey Tournament is the 39th CCHA Men's Ice Hockey Tournament. It was played between March 5 and March 20, 2010 at campus locations and at Joe Louis Arena in Detroit, Michigan, United States. The winning team, the University of Michigan Wolverines, received the Mason Cup and earned the Central Collegiate Hockey Association's automatic bid to the 2010 NCAA Division I Men's Ice Hockey Tournament.

== Format ==
The tournament features four rounds of play. In the first round, the fifth and twelfth, sixth and eleventh, seventh and tenth, and eighth and ninth seeds as determined by the final regular season standings play a best-of-three series, with the winner advancing to the quarterfinals. There, the first seed and lowest-ranked first-round winner, the second seed and second-lowest-ranked first-round winner, the third seed and second-highest-ranked first-round winner, and the fourth seed and highest-ranked first-round winner play a best-of-three series, with the winner advancing to the semifinals. In the semifinals, the highest and lowest seeds and second-highest and second-lowest seeds play a single game, with the winner advancing to the championship game and the loser advancing to the third-place game. The tournament champion receives an automatic bid to the 2010 NCAA Men's Division I Ice Hockey Tournament.

=== Regular season standings ===
Note: GP = Games played; W = Wins; L = Losses; T = Ties; PTS = Points; GF = Goals For; GA = Goals Against

2009–10 Central Collegiate Hockey Association standings
	Conference								Overall					
	GP	W	L	T	SW	PTS	GF	GA	GP	W	L	T	GF	GA
#3 Miami†	28	21	2	5	2	70	100	39	44	29	8	7	147	86
Michigan State	28	14	8	6	2	50	73	64	38	19	13	6	115	97
#14 Ferris State	28	13	9	6	4	49	79	66	40	21	13	6	118	92
#13 Northern Michigan	28	13	9	6	3	48	86	72	41	20	13	8	124	104
#15 Alaska	28	0^	28^	0^	0^	45	73	70	39	0^	39^	0^	108	93
Nebraska–Omaha	28	13	12	3	2	44	85	83	42	20	16	6	124	116
#8 Michigan*	28	14	13	1	0	43	83	69	45	26	18	1	148	102
Ohio State	28	10	12	6	4	40	81	93	39	15	18	6	110	122
Notre Dame	28	9	12	7	2	36	65	76	38	13	17	8	90	102
Lake Superior State	28	10	15	3	2	35	66	90	38	15	18	5	93	118
Bowling Green	28	4	18	6	5	23	58	102	36	5	25	6	71	138
Western Michigan	28	4	17	7	2	21	62	87	36	8	20	8	76	104
Championship: Michigan † indicates conference regular season champion * indicates conference tournament champion Final rankings: USA Today/USA Hockey Magazine Top 15 Poll^ Alaska was retroactively required to forfeit all wins and ties due to player ineligibilities.

== Bracket ==
First round March 5–7
5	Alaska	4	4	—
12	Western Michigan	0	1	—
6	Nebraska-Omaha	6	6	—
11	Bowling Green	1	1	—
7	Michigan	5	6	—
10	Lake Superior State	2	0	—
8	Ohio State	3	8	—
9	Notre Dame	1	2	—

Quarterfinals; March 12–14
1	Miami	6	4	2
8	Ohio State	2	5*	1
2	Michigan State	1	3	—
7	Michigan	5	5	—
3	Ferris State	3	3*	—
6	Nebraska-Omaha	1	2	—
4	Northern Michigan	4	5	—
5	Alaska	3	1	—

Semifinals; March 19
1	Miami	2
7	Michigan	5
3	Ferris State	4
4	Northern Michigan	5*

Championship; March 20
7	Michigan	2
4	Northern Michigan	1
Third place
1	Miami	2
3	Ferris State	1

Note: * denotes overtime period(s)

=== First round ===
==== (5) Alaska vs. (12) Western Michigan ====
March 5	Alaska	4 – 0	Western Michigan	Carlson Center	Recap
Kevin Petovello - 13:29; Dion Knelsen - 17:52		First period	No scoring
Aaron Gens - 14:27		Second period	No scoring
Nik Yaremchuk - 11:51		Third period	No scoring
Scott Greenham ( 16 saves / 16 shots )		Goalie stats	Riley Gill ( 40 saves / 44 shots )

March 6	Alaska	4 – 1	Western Michigan	Carlson Center	Recap
Derek Klassen - 01:02; Jarret Granberg - 17:21		First period	07:49 - Ryan Watson
Dion Knelsen - pp - 15:28; Andy Taranto - 16:07		Second period	No scoring
No scoring		Third period	No scoring
Scott Greenham ( 27 saves / 28 shots )		Goalie stats	Riley Gill ( 36 saves / 40 shots )

Alaska won series 2–0

==== (6) Nebraska-Omaha vs. (11) Bowling Green ====
March 5	Nebraska-Omaha	6 – 1	Bowling Green	Qwest Center Omaha	Recap
Terry Broadhurst - pp - 07:51; Dan Swanson - 10:54		First period	05:45 - Tomas Petruska
Alex Hudson - 01:48; Mark Bernier - 02:29; Joey Martin - pp - 07:00; John Kemp - pp - 16:51		Second period	No scoring
No scoring		Third period	No scoring
Jeremie Dupont ( 25 saves / 26 shots )		Goalie stats	Andrew Hammond ( 14 saves / 18 shots ) Nick Eno ( 21 saves / 23 shots )

March 6	Nebraska-Omaha	6 – 1	Bowling Green	Qwest Center Omaha	Recap
No scoring		First period	No scoring
John Kemp - 07:28; Jordan Willert - 12:56; Alex Hudson - 16:15; Jeric Agosta - 16:33		Second period	No scoring
Eddie Del Grosso - 13:52; Mark Bernier - pp - 14:43		Third period	06:06 - Brennan Vargas
Jeremie Dupont ( 16 saves / 17 shots )		Goalie stats	Nick Eno ( 24 saves / 28 shots ) Andrew Hammond ( 10 saves / 12 shots ) Phil Greer ( 0 saves / 0 shots )

Nebraska-Omaha won series 2–0

==== (7) Michigan vs. (10) Lake Superior State ====
March 5	Michigan	5 – 2	Lake Superior State	Yost Ice Arena	Recap
A. J. Treais - 10:38		First period	No scoring
David Wohlberg - 04:40		Second period	No scoring
Matt Rust - 00:37; Brian Lebler - 04:16; Chris Summers - en pp - 18:56		Third period	03:59 - Steven Kaunisto; 11:54 - Dillin Stonehouse
Shawn Hunwick ( 21 saves / 23 shots )		Goalie stats	Brian Mahoney-Wilson ( 38 saves / 42 shots )

March 6	Michigan	6 – 0	Lake Superior State	Yost Ice Arena	Recap
Louie Caporusso - 06:37; Jeff Rohrkemper - 14:00; Louie Caporusso - 15:33		First period	No scoring
Louie Caporusso - 00:46; Carl Hagelin - 14:18; Carl Hagelin - 16:49		Second period	No scoring
No scoring		Third period	No scoring
Shawn Hunwick ( 28 saves / 28 shots )		Goalie stats	Brian Mahoney-Wilson ( 28 saves / 34 shots ) Pat Inglis ( 12 saves / 12 shots )

Michigan won series 2–0

==== (8) Ohio State vs. (9) Notre Dame ====
March 5	Ohio State	3 – 1	Notre Dame	OSU Ice Rink	Recap
No scoring		First period	No scoring
Mathieu Picard - 03:37		Second period	No scoring
Mathieu Picard - 09:32; Zac Dalpe - 15:54		Third period	06:58 - Richard Ryan
Dustin Carlson ( 34 saves / 35 shots )		Goalie stats	Mike Johnson ( 25 saves / 28 shots )

March 6	Ohio State	8 – 2	Notre Dame	OSU Ice Rink	Recap
Matt Bartkowski - pp - 03:36; Sergio Somma - 04:00; Mathieu Picard - 12:20; C. J. Severyn - 17:53		First period	No scoring
Hunter Bishop - sh - 14:41; Hunter Bishop - 19:06		Second period	00:46 - pp - Calle Ridderwall
Sergio Somma - pp - 14:21; Hunter Bishop - 17:25		Third period	11:54 - Christiaan Minella
Dustin Carlson ( 47 saves / 49 shots )		Goalie stats	Mike Johnson ( 5 saves / 9 shots ) Tom O'Brien ( 12 saves / 16 shots )

Ohio State won series 2–0

=== Quarterfinals ===
==== (1) Miami vs. (8) Ohio State ====
March 12	Miami	6 – 2	Ohio State	Steve Cady Arena
Andy Miele - 11:32		First period	12:18 - Hunter Bishop; 18:28 - Hunter Bishop
Carter Camper - 00:17; Carter Camper - pp - 06:08; Jarod Palmer - 14:04; Andy Miele - pp - 16:28		Second period	No scoring
Alden Hirschfeld - 17:12		Third period	No scoring
Cody Reichard ( 26 saves / 28 shots )		Goalie stats	Dustin Carlson ( 22 saves / 27 shots ) Cal Heeter ( 14 saves / 15 shots )

March 13	Miami	4 – 5	OT	Ohio State	Steve Cady Arena

March 14	Miami	2 – 1	Ohio State	Steve Cady Arena

Miami wins 2–1

==== (2) Michigan State vs. (7) Michigan ====
March 12	Michigan State	1 – 5	Michigan	Munn Ice Arena	Recap
No scoring		First period	07:06 - Carl Hagelin; 10:18 - David Wohlberg; 13:35 - Louie Caporusso
Derek Grant - pp - 14:31		Second period	00:21 - pp - Steve Kampfer; 19:17 - Louie Caporusso
No scoring		Third period	No scoring
Drew Palmisano ( 20 saves / 25 shots ) Bobby Jarosz ( 7 saves / 7 shots )		Goalie stats	Shawn Hunwick ( 15 saves / 16 shots )

March 13	Michigan State	3 - 5	Michigan	Munn Ice Arena

Michigan Won Series 2–0

==== (3) Ferris State vs. (6) Nebraska-Omaha ====
March 12	Ferris State	3 – 1	Nebraska-Omaha	Ewigleben Arena	Recap
No scoring		First period	No scoring
Mike Embach - 07:16; Aaron Lewicki - pp - 14:42		Second period	No scoring
Mike Embach - pp - 08:31		Third period	18:37 - John Kemp
Pat Nagle ( 33 saves / 34 shots )		Goalie stats	Jeremie Dupont ( 33 saves / 36 shots )

March 13	Ferris State	3 – 2	OT	Nebraska-Omaha	Ewigleben Arena

Ferris State Won Series 2–0

==== (4) Northern Michigan vs. (5) Alaska ====
March 12	Northern Michigan	4 – 3	Alaska	Berry Events Center
Greger Hanson - 01:15; Andrew Fernandez - 11:44; Tyler Gron - 12:21		First period	No scoring
Kyle Follmer - 11:29		Second period	14:38 - pp - Dustin Sather
No scoring		Third period	11:47 - Nik Yaremchuk; 16:02 - pp - Bryant Molle
Brian Stewart ( 32 saves / 35 shots )		Goalie stats	Scott Greenham ( 20 saves / 24 shots )

March 13	Northern Michigan	5 – 1	Alaska	Berry Events Center

Northern Michigan Won Series 2–0

=== Semifinals ===
==== (1) Miami vs. (7) Michigan ====
March 19	Miami	2 – 5	Michigan	Joe Louis Arena

==== (3) Ferris State vs. (4) Northern Michigan ====
March 19	Ferris State	4 – 5	OT	Northern Michigan	Joe Louis Arena

=== Third place ===
==== (1) Miami vs. (3) Ferris State ====
March 20	Miami	2 – 1	Ferris State	Joe Louis Arena

=== Championship ===
==== (7) Michigan vs. (4) Northern Michigan ====
March 20	Michigan	2 – 1	Northern Michigan	Joe Louis Arena

== Tournament awards ==
=== All-Tournament Team ===
- F Carl Hagelin (Michigan)
- F Ray Kaunisto (Northern Michigan)
- F Louie Caporusso (Michigan)
- D Steven Kampfer (Michigan)
- D Eric Gustaffson (Northern Michigan)
- G Shawn Hunwick* (Michigan)

* Most Valuable Player(s)
