= Louie Caporusso =

Canadian ice hockey player

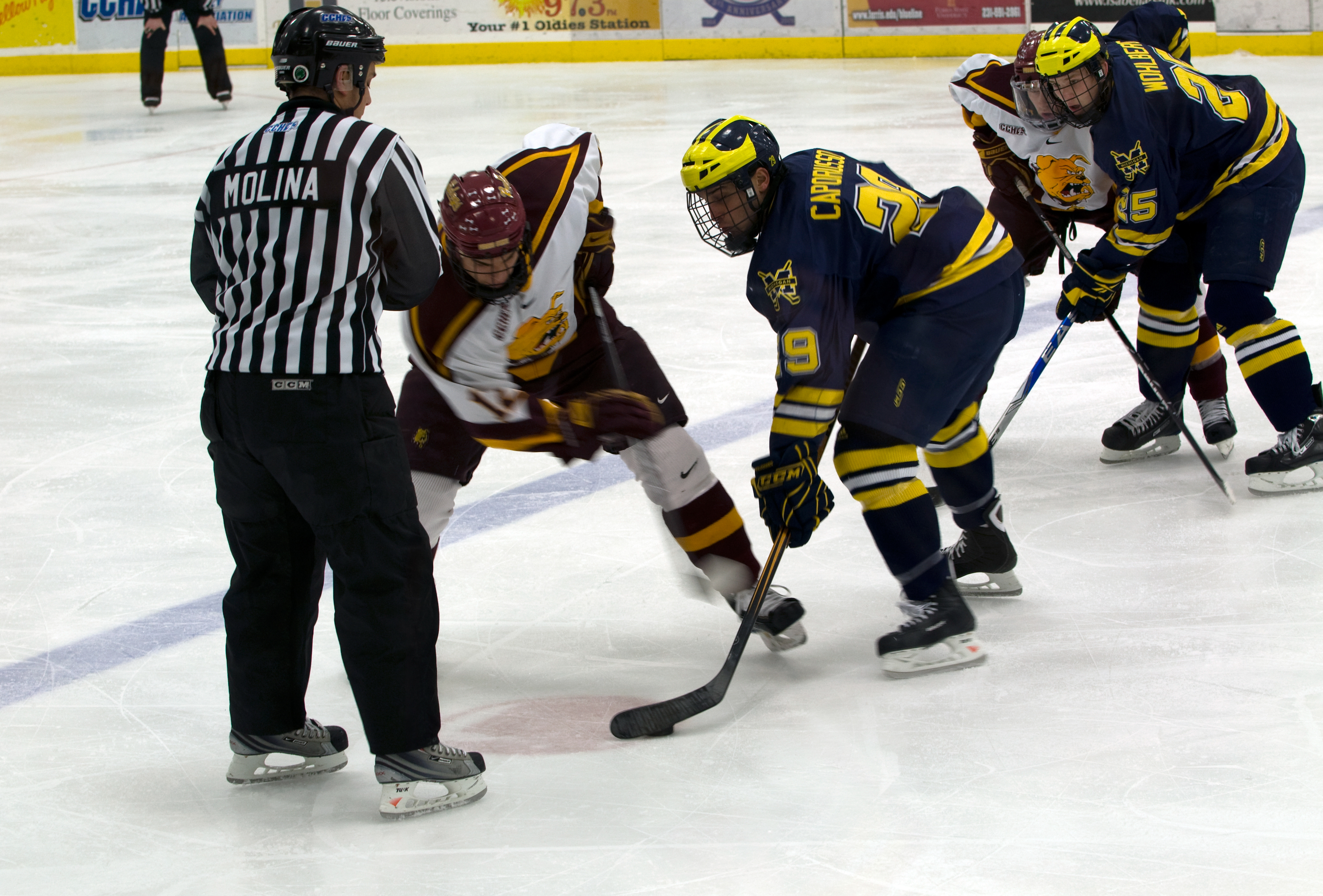
- Caporusso (right) with the Michigan Wolverines in 2009
- Born: June 21, 1989 (age 37) Toronto, Ontario, Canada
- Height: 5 ft 10 in (178 cm)
- Weight: 185 lb (84 kg; 13 st 3 lb)
- Position: Forward
- Shoots: Left
- ECHL team Former teams: Cincinnati Cyclones; Binghamton Senators; Augsburger Panther; Iserlohn Roosters; Brynäs IF; Asiago Hockey 1935
- NHL draft: 90th overall, 2007; Ottawa Senators
- Playing career: 2011–present

Luigi "Louie" Caporusso (born June 21, 1989) is an Italian-Canadian ice hockey player. He is currently playing under contract to the Cincinnati Cyclones of the ECHL. Caporusso was drafted by the Ottawa Senators in the 3rd round (90th overall) of the 2007 NHL entry draft.

Caporusso played from 2007 to 2011 with the University of Michigan Wolverines team. During the 2008–09 Michigan Wolverines men's ice hockey season, he was named to the All-Central Collegiate Hockey Association (CCHA) first team. He was also named first-team AHCA/Reebok Division I Ice Hockey All-American. He led the nation in goals scored for most of the 2008–09 NCAA Division I men's ice hockey season. During the 2009–10 Michigan Wolverines men's ice hockey season, he was named to the CCHA All-tournament team as he led the team to the championship. Prior to his time at the University of Michigan, he excelled in junior hockey in Ontario, Canada, which earned him a position as a draftee by the Ottawa Senators of the National Hockey League before entering college. After finishing his senior season, Caporusso signed with the Senators on May 30, 2011.

Since his time at Michigan he has played several years of minor league hockey as well as spent time playing internationally. Most of his professional career has been for teams in the Deutsche Eishockey Liga and East Coast Hockey League.

== Early life ==
Luigi Caporusso was one of four children born to two Italian parents in Toronto, where the family was raised. Both his father and maternal grandfather are named Luigi and his parents and grandparents are all from Italy. At age five, he watched his brother Francesco dominate at hockey. He started to play hockey after his father took him ice skating.

== Playing career ==
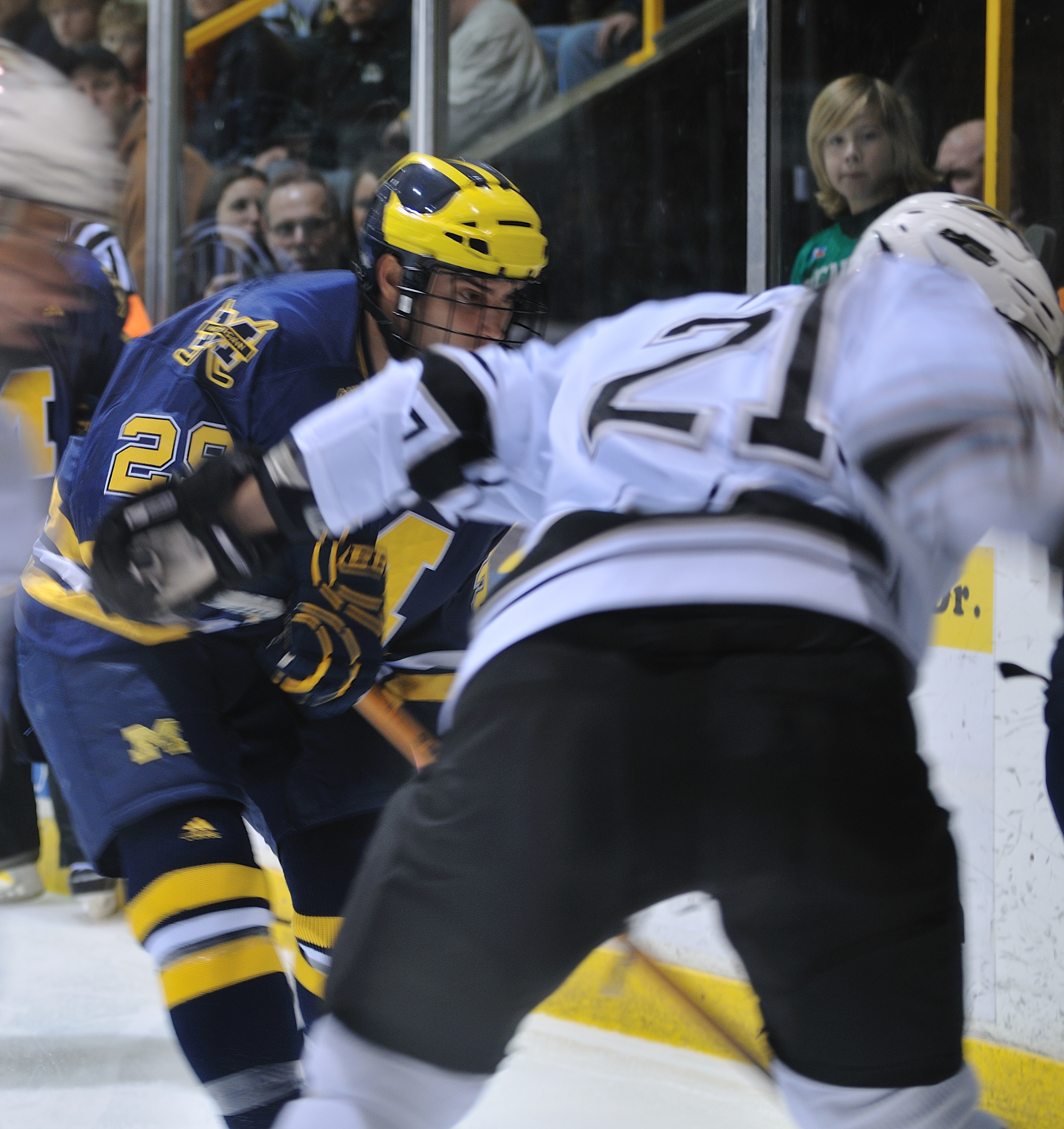
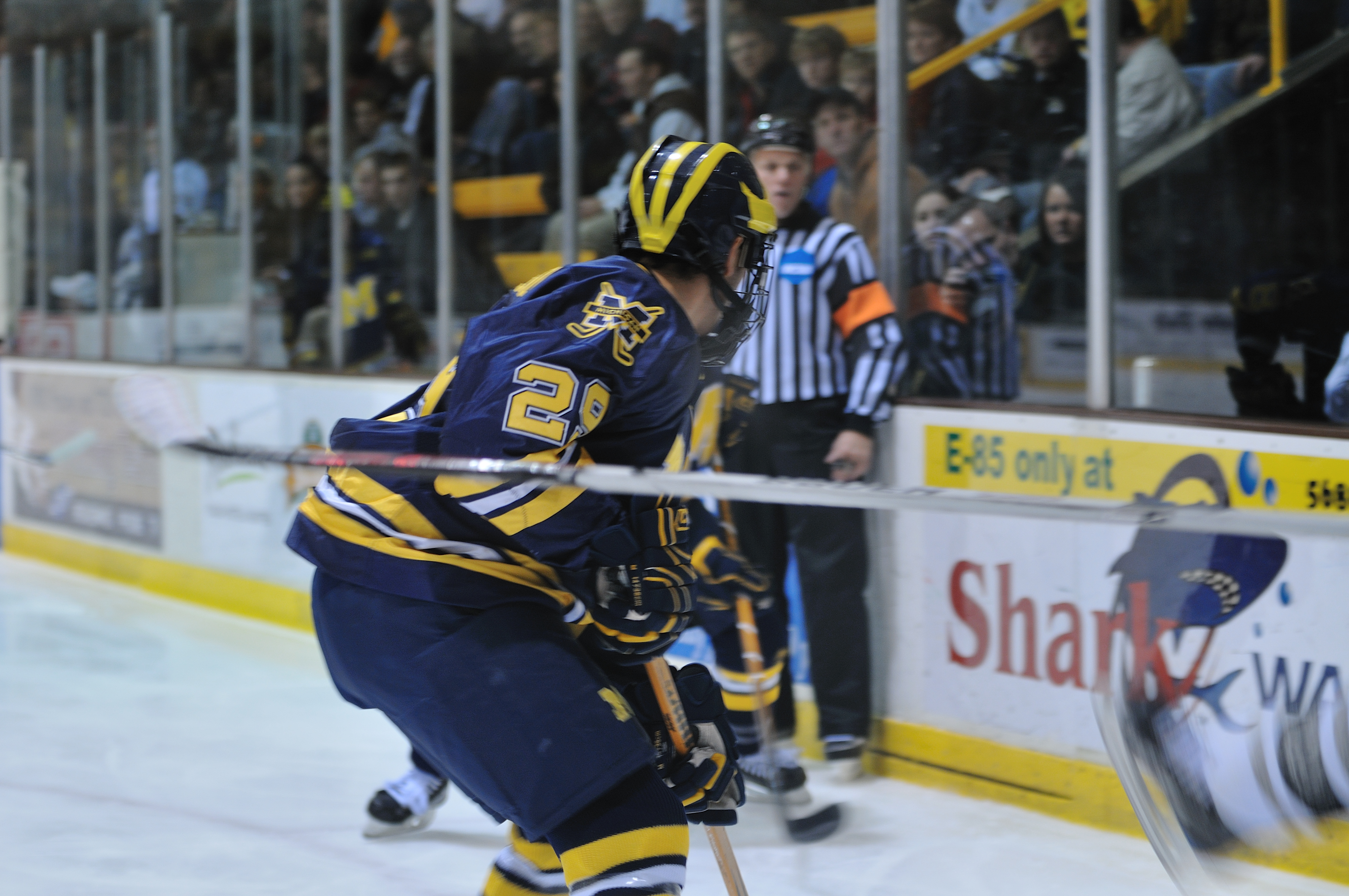
Caporusso vs. Western Michigan (2008-11-15)

=== Junior ===
During the 2004–05 season, he played in the Greater Toronto Hockey League (GTHL) for the Toronto Red Wings, recording 70 points including 41 goals in 56 games. The 70-point total made him the GTHL point leader for the season.

After his league leading performance, he was drafted by the Toronto St. Michael's Majors of the Ontario Hockey League with the seventh selection of the tenth round, but instead of playing for them, he spent the following two seasons playing in the Ontario Junior Hockey League (OPJHL) for the St. Michael's Buzzers. During the 2005–06 season, he led the OPJHL in scoring with 73 points in 48 games and led the team to the OPJHL championship. Caporusso scored 50 points in 37 games during the 2006–07 season, but the team lost in the finals. Following the season, he was drafted with the 90th selection overall in the 3rd round by the Ottawa Senators in the June 22, 2007 NHL entry draft.

As a junior player, he earned a variety of all-star selections. He participated in the 2006 Canadian Junior Hockey League Top Prospects Game, earning Team East MVP honors. In addition, he was selected for the 2007 Ontario Hockey Association Top Prospect Team and the 2007 OPJHL All-Star team. He was also a silver medalist for Team Canada East at the 2006 World Junior A Challenge where he was selected to tournament's all-star team.

=== College ===
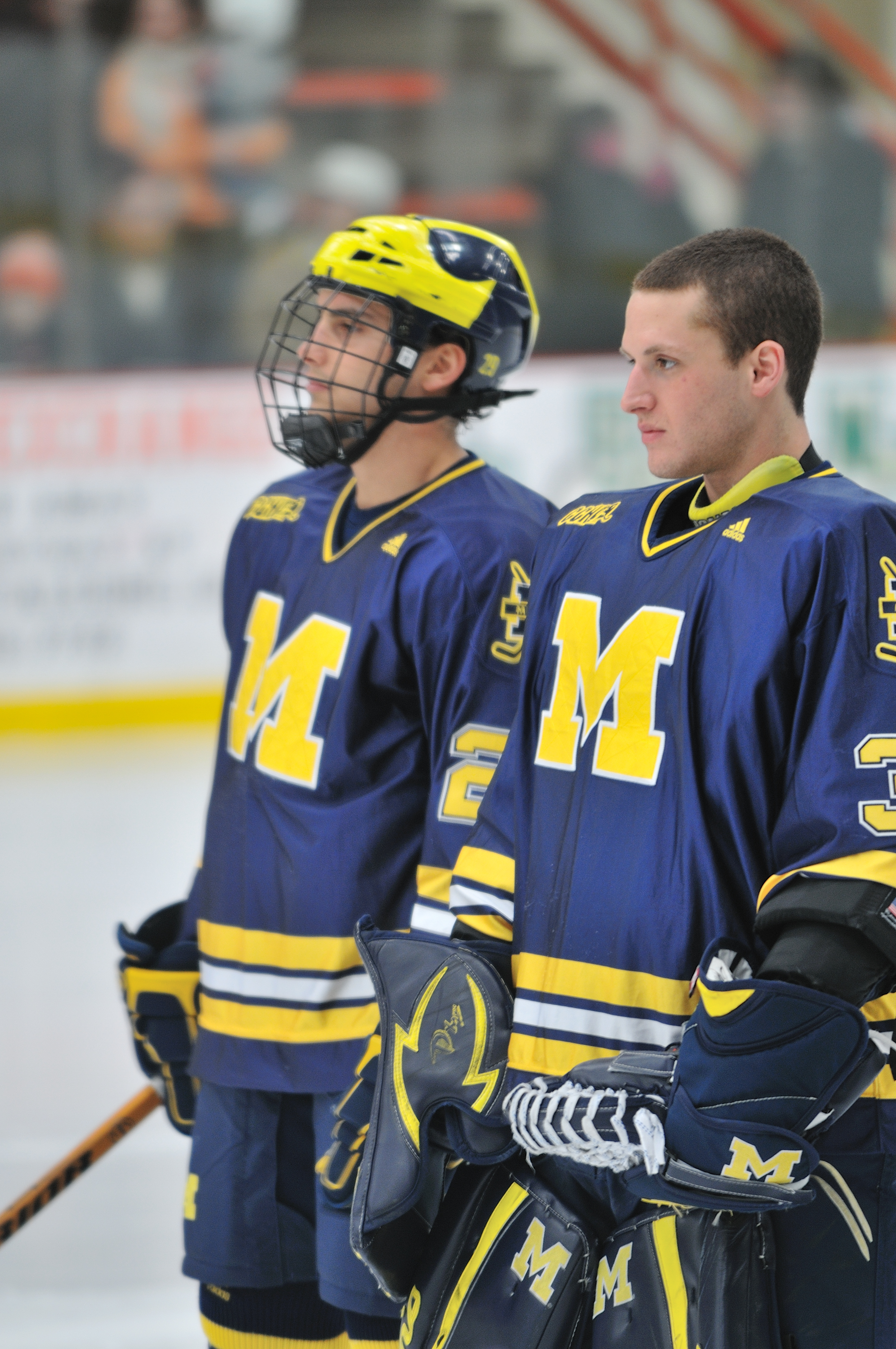
Caporusso (left) next to Bryan Hogan

Caporusso, is described as a left-handed shooting forward by some sources, and he is described as either a left wing or a center by others. However, the Ann Arbor Press described him as a center. The Ottawa Senators have him listed as a centre.

As a freshman at Michigan, he scored 21 points, including 12 goals, in 33 games. That season he missed 8 games due to a leg injury. As a sophomore during the 2008–09 season, Caporusso was 1 of 10 finalists for the Hobey Baker Award. During the season, he scored 49 points in 41 games. He was also named to the All-Central Collegiate Hockey Association (CCHA) first-team and AHCA/Reebok Division I Ice Hockey All-American first-team along with teammate Aaron Palushaj. In addition, he was selected to the CCHA All-Conference tournament team. One of the highlights of the season occurred when he scored the first 3 goals of the game in the first period (the first 2 within 24 seconds of each other) for the natural hat trick against Michigan Tech on December 27, 2008. During the first half of the season, he led the nation in goals scored. He played a different scoring role during the final 9 regular season games, as the team went 8–1 and he scored 2 goals and posted 14 assists. Caporusso was named the team MVP at the end of the season.

In Caporusso's junior season, he posted 21 goals and 22 assists. Michigan began the season ranked number five in the nation, but Caporusso only scored one goal in his first 10 games and had no multigoal games until well into February. Michigan entered the CCHA playoffs with a 19–17–1 record and was on the verge of breaking the team's 19 consecutive year streak of qualifying for the NCAA Men's Ice Hockey Championship. However, the team won 6 consecutive games in the conference championship tournament to earn the automatic invitation. Caporusso scored both goals in the final 2–1 victory of the tournament and was named to the All-Tournament team. He also scored in the second period of the first game of the tournament to give Michigan a 2–0 lead. However, Michigan lost in the quarterfinal round in double overtime to the CCHA regular season champion Miami Redhawks.

As a senior, he served as captain of the team. The 2010–11 Michigan Wolverines men's ice hockey team was the 2001–11 CCHA regular season champion. Subsequently, the team finished as runner-up in the 2011 NCAA Division I Men's Ice Hockey Tournament. Caporusso finished second on the team in scoring for the third consecutive season.

=== Professional ===
Caporusso signed a two-year entry-level contract with the Senators on May 30, 2011. After attending Ottawa's NHL training camp, He was expected to join the Binghamton Senators to begin his professional career. On October 14, 2011, Caporusso was reassigned to the Elmira Jackals of the ECHL. After scoring 5 points in his first 5 games with Elmira, he was promoted to the Binghamton Senators of the American Hockey League on November 4. After recording 0 points in 6 games with Binghamton, he was reassigned to Elmira on November 17. On November 26, Caporusso was recalled by Binghamton for one game before being returned to Elmira on November 28. Caporusso spent 4 months with the Jackals (missing 6 weeks due to a concussion), scoring 16 goals and 16 assists in 29 games, before being called back up to the Senators on March 15.

At the conclusion of his contract Caporusso's rights were relinquished by the Senators. On August 15, 2013, he signed as a free agent to a 1-year contract with reigning champions the Reading Royals of the ECHL.

In his Deutsche Eishockey Liga (DEL) debut for the Augsburger Panther, he scored the game-winning goal in a shootout. He scored 8 goals in 31 shots on goal for a team-high 26% shooting percentage for the 2013–14 season. Augsburger exercised the team option on his contract for a second year. After parts of two seasons in the DEL with Augsburger Panther, Caporusso joined fellow German club, Iserlohn Roosters on a one-year contract on June 12, 2015. In the 2016–17 season with the Roosters, his second year in Iserlohn, Caporusso played on the top two scoring lines finishing 3rd in scoring with 29 points in 42 games as Iserlohn finished out of playoff contention. On March 3, 2017, it was announced that Caporusso would not re-new his contract with the club to seek other opportunities in Europe.

On March 6, 2017, Caporusso agreed to a move to Sweden, signing a 1-year deal with Brynäs IF of the top tier Swedish Hockey League. He began the 2017–18 season by appearing in only 7 games with Brynäs before opting to terminate his contract with the club and return to Germany with former team, the Iserlohn Roosters, on a two-year deal on November 1, 2017. Upon joining Iserlohn, he had a knee injury in his first game. After some rehab work, he played in 24 games before requiring season-ending surgery on his patellar tendon in February 2018.

Caporusso spent a season with Italian club, Asiago Hockey 1935 of the Alps Hockey League (AlpsHL) for the 2019–2020 season. On July 28, 2021, Caporusso marked his return to professional hockey in agreeing to a 1-year deal in the ECHL with the Cincinnati Cyclones. For the 2022–23 ECHL season, he was the leading scorer as the team approached the final week of the season. He continued with the Cyclones through the 2023–24 season.

== Personal ==
Born in Toronto, Ontario, Caporusso is from Woodbridge, Ontario. At the University of Michigan, Caporusso was enrolled in the School of Kinesiology and performed public service by visiting the U-M Mott Children's Hospital. Caporusso is a 2007 graduate of the St. Michael's College School in Toronto.

== Career statistics ==
Medal record

Ice hockey

Representing Canada East

World Junior A Challenge
Silver medal – second place	2006 Yorkton	

			Regular season					Playoffs
Season	Team	League	GP	G	A	Pts	PIM	GP	G	A	Pts	PIM
2004–05	Toronto Red Wings Min. Midget	GTHL	53	38	28	66	28	—	—	—	—	—
2005–06	St. Michael's Buzzers	OPJHL	48	29	44	73	44	25	8	10	18	16
2006–07	St. Michael's Buzzers	OPJHL	37	23	27	50	45	20	14	19	33	14
2007–08	Michigan Wolverines	CCHA	33	12	9	21	18	—	—	—	—	—
2008–09	Michigan Wolverines	CCHA	41	24	25	49	30	—	—	—	—	—
2009–10	Michigan Wolverines	CCHA	45	21	22	43	26	—	—	—	—	—
2010–11	Michigan Wolverines	CCHA	41	11	20	31	22	—	—	—	—	—
2011–12	Binghamton Senators	AHL	13	0	0	0	6	—	—	—	—	—
2011–12	Elmira Jackals	ECHL	29	16	16	32	8	—	—	—	—	—
2012–13	Binghamton Senators	AHL	23	1	5	6	8	—	—	—	—	—
2012–13	Elmira Jackals	ECHL	41	19	26	45	22	6	2	6	8	4
2013–14	Reading Royals	ECHL	24	7	21	28	23	—	—	—	—	—
2013–14	Augsburger Panther	DEL	19	8	13	21	4	—	—	—	—	—
2014–15	Augsburger Panther	DEL	47	15	23	38	46	—	—	—	—	—
2015–16	Iserlohn Roosters	DEL	49	18	30	48	32	6	2	2	4	0
2016–17	Iserlohn Roosters	DEL	42	13	16	29	56	—	—	—	—	—
2017–18	Brynäs IF	SHL	7	0	1	1	0	—	—	—	—	—
2017–18	Iserlohn Roosters	DEL	25	10	9	19	18	—	—	—	—	—
2018–19	Iserlohn Roosters	DEL	36	14	13	27	24	—	—	—	—	—
2019–20	Asiago Hockey 1935	AlpsHL	19	7	11	18	12	—	—	—	—	—
2021–22	Cincinnati Cyclones	ECHL	67	22	44	66	32	6	0	5	5	12
2022–23	Cincinnati Cyclones	ECHL	68	23	48	71	50	11	2	0	2	6
2023–24	Cincinnati Cyclones	ECHL	34	10	19	29	63	—	—	—	—	—
AHL totals			36	1	5	6	14	—	—	—	—	—

- All statistics taken from NHL.com

== Awards and honors ==
Award	Year
College
All-CCHA First Team	2008–09
AHCA West First-Team All-American	2008–09
CCHA All-Tournament Team	2009, 2010
