= 2008–09 Bowling Green Falcons men's ice hockey season =

- Conference: 12th CCHA
- Home ice: BGSU Ice Arena

Rankings
- USA Today/USA Hockey Magazine: —
- USCHO.com/CBS College Sports: —

Record
- Overall: 11–24–3
- Home: 9–9–2
- Road: 2–15–1

Coaches and captains
- Head coach: Scott Paluch
- Captain: Kyle Page
- Alternate captain(s): Kevin Schmidt; Brandon Svendsen

The 2008–09 Bowling Green Falcons men's ice hockey team represented Bowling Green State University in the 2008–09 NCAA Division I men's ice hockey season. Their regular season began on October 10, 2008, against RIT and concluded on February 28, 2009, against Western Michigan. Despite finishing last in the Central Collegiate Hockey Association, Bowling Green advanced to the 2009 CCHA Men's Ice Hockey Tournament where they were eliminated two games to none by Ohio State in the opening round.

== Pre-season ==
In May 2008, assistant coach and former Falcon player, Doug Schueller, left the team to become the head coach of the ice hockey team at Saint John's (MN), becoming the 22nd head coach in the Johnnies' history. and was replaced by another former Falcons player and graduate assistant, Dennis Williams, in July. Once again in August, the hockey team lost another assistant coach, when Todd Reirden took a position as assistant coach with the Wilkes-Barre/Scranton Penguins of the American Hockey League under former Bowling Green teammate Dan Bylsma and was replaced with Frank Novock who was an assistant with Wayne State University's ice hockey program before it was disbanded.

A month before the season, Paluch named senior defenseman Tim Maxwell and junior defenseman Kyle Page as co-captains for the upcoming season. At the CCHA media day, the Falcons were voted to finish ninth by the league's coaches with 56 points and seventh by the league's media partners with 444 points. Also at the media day, sophomore forward Jacob Cepis was named an honorable mention to the preseason all-conference team. The Falcons entered the season returning 21 letter winners, while losing six including Buffalo Sabres prospect, Derek Whitmore who scored 102 points during his four-year career with Bowling Green.

2008 Exhibition Game Log: 1–0–0 (Home: 1–0–0; Road: 0–0–0)
#	Date	Visitor	Score	Home	OT	Decision	Attendance	Record
1	October 4	Wilfrid Laurier	1–5	Bowling Green		Spratt	—	1–0–0

=== Recruiting ===
2008–09 Recruits
State	Player	Shoots	Position	Hometown	Previous Team
(New York (state))	Nick Bailen	R	D	Fredonia, New York	Indiana (USHL)
(Ontario)	James McIntosh	L	RW	Holland Landing, Ontario	Stouffville (OPJHL)
(Alberta)	Dean Petiot	L	D	Daysland, Alberta	Camrose (AJHL)
(New Jersey)	Bryan Potacco	L	RW	Kinnelon, New Jersey	St. Michael's (OPJHL)
(Ontario)	Cameron Sinclair	L	LW	Windsor, Ontario	Surrey (BCHL)
(Minnesota)	Brennan Vargas	L	RW	Coon Rapids, Minnesota	Burnaby (BCHL)

== Standings ==
2008–09 Central Collegiate Hockey Association standings
	Conference								Overall					
	GP	W	L	T	SW	PTS	GF	GA	GP	W	L	T	GF	GA
#4 Notre Dame†*	28	21	4	3	3	48	95	52	40	31	6	3	135	69
#5 Michigan	28	20	8	0	0	40	98	51	41	29	12	0	145	84
#2 Miami	28	17	7	4	2	40	89	57	41	23	13	5	128	89
Alaska	28	0^	28^	0^	0^	34	54	51	39	0^	39^	0^	74	68
Ohio State	28	13	11	4	3	33	87	85	42	23	15	4	143	119
Northern Michigan	28	11	12	5	3	30	72	73	41	19	17	5	111	103
Western Michigan	28	9	13	6	2	26	75	86	41	14	20	7	111	130
Nebraska–Omaha	28	8	13	7	3	26	62	76	40	15	17	8	98	103
Ferris State	28	9	14	5	2	25	58	68	38	12	19	7	90	105
Lake Superior State	28	7	15	6	1	21	73	86	39	11	20	8	110	115
Michigan State	28	7	17	4	3	21	43	85	38	10	23	5	62	118
Bowling Green	28	8	19	1	0	17	60	96	38	11	24	3	89	131
Championship: Notre Dame † indicates conference regular season champion * indicates conference tournament champion Final rankings: USA Today/USA Hockey Magazine Top 15 Poll^ Alaska was retroactively required to forfeit all wins and ties due to player ineligibilities.

== Schedule and results ==
- Green background indicates shootout/overtime win (conference only) or win (2 points).
- Red background indicates regulation loss (0 points).
- White background indicates overtime/shootout loss (conference only) or tie (1 point).

2008–09 Game Log

October: 3–3–1 (Home: 2–0–1; Road: 1–3–0)
#	Date	Visitor	Score	Home	OT	Decision	Attendance	CCHA	Overall
1†	October 10	RIT	2–4	Bowling Green		Spratt	1,148	0–0–0–0	1–0–0
2†	October 11	Niagara	3–3	Bowling Green		Spratt	1,004	0–0–0–0	1–0–1
3†	October 17	Bowling Green	3–5	Boston College		Spratt	4,360	0–0–0–0	1–1–1
4†	October 18	Bowling Green	3–4	Providence		Spratt	1,392	0–0–0–0	1–2–1
5	October 24	Bowling Green	1–0	Alaska		Spratt	2,707	1–0–0–0	2–2–1
6	October 25	Bowling Green	0–3	Alaska		Spratt	2,888	1–1–0–0	2–3–1
7	October 31	Nebraska-Omaha	2–3	Bowling Green		Spratt	1,246	2–1–0–0	3–3–1

November: 2–5–2 (Home: 2–3–1; Road: 0–2–1)
#	Date	Visitor	Score	Home	OT	Decision	Attendance	CCHA	Overall
8	November 1	Nebraska-Omaha	5–3	Bowling Green		Spratt	1,597	2–2–0–0	3–4–1
9	November 7	Bowling Green	0–2	Lake Superior State		Spratt	2,138	2–3–0–0	3–5–1
10	November 8	Bowling Green	4–4	Lake Superior State	SOL	Spratt	2,394	2–3–1–0	3–5–2
11	November 14	Northern Michigan	1–2	Bowling Green	OT	Spratt	1,959	3–3–1–0	4–5–2
12	November 15	Northern Michigan	1–2	Bowling Green		Spratt	1,980	4–3–1–0	5–5–2
13	November 21	Bowling Green	1–5	Notre Dame		Spratt	2,857	4–4–1–0	5–6–2
14	November 22	Notre Dame	9–1	Bowling Green		Spratt	3,422	4–5–1–0	5–7–2
15†	November 28	Minnesota State	2–2	Bowling Green		Spratt	1,494	4–5–1–0	5–7–3
16†	November 29	Minnesota State	5–2	Bowling Green		Spratt	1,562	4–5–1–0	5–8–3

December: 2–2–0 (Home: 2–1–0; Road: 0–1–0)
#	Date	Visitor	Score	Home	OT	Decision	Attendance	CCHA	Overall
17	December 12	Notre Dame	3–1	Bowling Green		Spratt	3,113	4–6–1–0	5–9–3
18	December 13	Bowling Green	3–4	Notre Dame		Spratt	2,857	4–7–1–0	5–10–3
19†	December 19	Clarkson	1–4	Bowling Green		Spratt	1,294	4–7–1–0	6–10–3
20†	December 20	Clarkson	1–3	Bowling Green		Spratt	1,220	4–7–1–0	7–10–3

January: 2–6–0 (Home: 1–4–0; Road: 1–2–0)
#	Date	Visitor	Score	Home	OT	Decision	Attendance	CCHA	Overall
21	January 9	Ohio State	8–5	Bowling Green		Spratt	1,781	4–8–1–0	7–11–3
22	January 10	Ohio State	4–3	Bowling Green	OT	Eno	2,435	4–9–1–0	7–12–3
23	January 16	Bowling Green	3–0	Michigan		Spratt	6,815	5–9–1–0	8–12–3
24	January 17	Michigan	1–0	Bowling Green		Sauer	4,017	5–10–1–0	8–13–3
25	January 23	Lake Superior State	3–4	Bowling Green		Spratt	2,178	6–10–1–0	9–13–3
26	January 24	Lake Superior State	8–4	Bowling Green		Eno	2,174	6–11–1–0	9–14–3
27	January 30	Bowling Green	1–6	Miami (OH)		Eno	2,398	6–12–1–0	9–15–3
28	January 31	Bowling Green	2–3	Miami (OH)		Spratt	3,183	6–13–1–0	9–16–3

February: 2–6–0 (Home: 2–1–0; Road: 0–5–0)
#	Date	Visitor	Score	Home	OT	Decision	Attendance	CCHA	Overall
29	February 6	Bowling Green	0–3	Northern Michigan		Spratt	2,432	6–14–1–0	9–17–3
30	February 7	Bowling Green	1–4	Northern Michigan		Eno	2,481	6–15–1–0	9–18–3
31	February 13	Ferris State	3–2	Bowling Green		Spratt	1,918	6–16–1–0	9–19–3
32	February 14	Ferris State	1–3	Bowling Green		Spratt	2,029	7–16–1–0	10–19–3
33	February 20	Bowling Green	2–3	Michigan State		Spratt	5,891	7–17–1–0	10–20–3
34	February 21	Michigan State	0–4	Bowling Green		Spratt	3,311	8–17–1–0	11–20–3
35	February 27	Bowling Green	2–5	Western Michigan		Spratt	1,883	8–18–1–0	11–21–3
36	February 28	Bowling Green	3–5	Western Michigan		Eno	2,796	8–19–1–0	11–22–3

March: 0–2–0 (Home: 0–0–0; Road: 0–2–0)
#	Date	Visitor	Score	Home	OT	Decision	Attendance	CCHA	Overall
37†°	March 6	Bowling Green	4–5	Ohio State		Spratt	817	8–19–1–0	11–23–3
38†°	March 7	Bowling Green	1–7	Ohio State		Spratt	956	8–19–1–0	11–24–3

† Denotes a non-conference game

° Denotes 2009 CCHA Men's Ice Hockey Tournament first round

== Player statistics ==
=== Skaters ===
Note: GP = Games played; G = Goals; A = Assists; Pts = Points; +/- = Plus–minus; PIM = Penalty minutes

Player	GP	G	A	Pts	PIM
Dan Sexton	38	17	22	39	20
Brandon Svendsen	38	12	18	30	36
David Solway	38	12	12	24	62
Kai Kantola	36	12	6	18	63
Nick Bailen	37	6	10	16	58
James Perkin	38	7	7	14	0
Kyle Page	38	4	10	14	20
Kevin Schmidt	38	4	6	10	0
Josh Boyd	35	3	6	9	8
Tommy Dee	37	7	1	8	28
Todd McIlrath	31	1	7	8	0
Patrick Tiesling	38	0	6	6	14
Jacob Cepis	18	1	4	5	0
Wade Finegan	19	2	2	4	16
Tomas Petruska	36	1	3	4	44
Andrew Krelove	38	0	4	4	32
Bryan Potacco	18	0	3	3	4
Russ Sinkewich	22	0	2	2	0
James McIntosh	34	0	2	2	32
Cameron Sinclair	7	0	1	1	4
Tim Maxwell	11	0	1	1	4
Dean Petiot	5	0	0	0	2
Brennan Vargas	7	0	0	0	2
Brian Moore	27	0	0	0	12

=== Goaltenders ===
Note: GP = Games played; TOI = Time on ice; W = Wins; L = Losses; T = Ties; GA = Goals against; SO = Shutouts; SV% = Save percentage; GAA = Goals against average; G = Goals; A = Assists; PIM = Penalty minutes

Player	GP	TOI	W	L	T	GA	SO	Sv%	GAA	G	A	PIM
Jimmy Spratt	34	1951	11	19	3	99	3	.891	3.04	0	1	0
Nick Eno	7	328	0	5	0	25	0	.805	4.58	0	2	0
