= Three Stars (song) =

1972 song performed by Eddie Cochran

"Three Stars" is a song written by Tommy Dee in 1959, as a tribute to Buddy Holly, Ritchie Valens, and J.P. Richardson (The Big Bopper), who died in a plane crash earlier that year. The song was recorded by Tommy Dee with Carol Kay and first released on April 5, 1959, by Crest Records.

The lyrics suggested the three "stars" represent the three musicians that died in the crash.

== Eddie Cochran version ==
"Three Stars"

Song by Eddie Cochran

from the album Legendary Masters Series
- Released: 1972
- Recorded: 1959
- Label: United Artists
- Songwriter: Tommy Dee

A year after Eddie Cochran recorded the song, he died in a car accident on his way to an airport. Although recorded in 1959, Cochran's version was not released until 1966 as a UK single and for the first time in the US on the album Legendary Masters Series. Cochran audibly breaks into sobs in his recording, most notably during the second verse.

== Other versions ==
"Three Stars" was also covered by:

- Ruby Wright (1959)
- Bonnie Owens with Tommy Dee (1963, recorded in tribute to Hawkshaw Hawkins, Cowboy Copas and Patsy Cline.)
- Showaddywaddy (1975)
- Palma Violets (2013)
