= Nick Sirota =

American ice hockey player

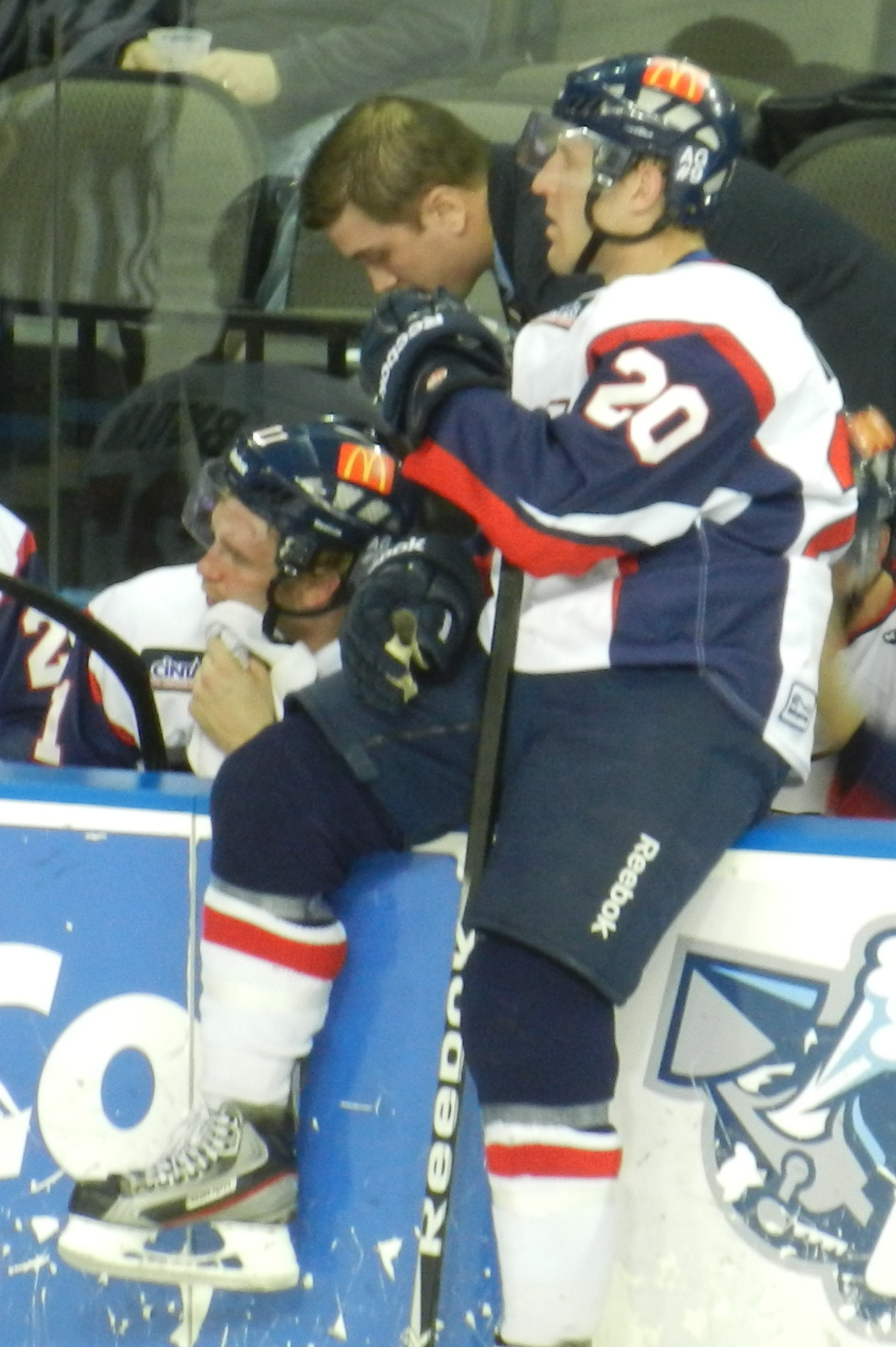
- Born: January 28, 1984 (age 41); Beaver Dam, Wisconsin, United States
- Height: 6 ft 0 in (183 cm)
- Weight: 188 lb (85 kg; 13 st 6 lb)
- Position: Right wing
- Shoots: Right
- ECHL team Former teams: Kalamazoo Wings; Idaho Steelheads; Missouri Mavericks; Frisk Asker
- Playing career: 2009–present

Nick Sirota (born January 28, 1984) is a former American professional ice hockey Right winger who last played with the Kalamazoo Wings of the ECHL.

In August 2011, Sirota, at the time a member of the Missouri Mavericks of the Central Hockey League, was traded to the Arizona Sundogs for future considerations. Sirota did not report to the Sundogs, though, instead signing with the Kalamazoo Wings on September 22, 2011.

In the 2013–14 season, Sirota played for Frisk Asker of the Norwegian GET-ligaen. His contract was terminated when he failed to appear for practice after Christmas holidays and the club could not reach him despite repeated attempts, this was considered breach of contract. He later returned to the Kalamazoo Wings on January 7, 2014.

== Career statistics ==
			Regular season					Playoffs
Season	Team	League	GP	G	A	Pts	PIM	GP	G	A	Pts	PIM
2002–03	Central Texas Blackhawks	AWHL	55	28	12	40	65	—	—	—	—	—
2003–04	Rögle BK	J20	36	16	8	24	40	3	5	0	5	0
2004–05	Spruce Grove Saints	AJHL	64	23	26	49	73	—	—	—	—	—
2005–06	Northern Michigan University	CCHA	20	5	2	7	4	—	—	—	—	—
2006–07	Northern Michigan University	CCHA	41	10	10	20	12	—	—	—	—	—
2007–08	Northern Michigan University	CCHA	43	18	18	36	30	—	—	—	—	—
2008–09	Northern Michigan University	CCHA	41	12	15	27	34	—	—	—	—	—
2008–09	Idaho Steelheads	ECHL	3	1	2	3	4	—	—	—	—	—
2009–10	Missouri Mavericks	CHL	62	19	26	45	32	6	3	2	5	4
2010–11	Missouri Mavericks	CHL	66	26	36	62	50	9	6	2	8	22
2011–12	Kalamazoo Wings	ECHL	60	22	23	45	32	14	7	6	13	19
2012–13	Kalamazoo Wings	ECHL	69	22	19	41	95	—	—	—	—	—
2013–14	Frisk Asker	GET	26	3	19	22	55	—	—	—	—	—
2013–14	Kalamazoo Wings	ECHL	42	13	17	30	75	5	1	1	2	16
ECHL totals			174	58	61	119	206	19	8	7	15	35
