= Patrick Galivan =

American ice hockey player

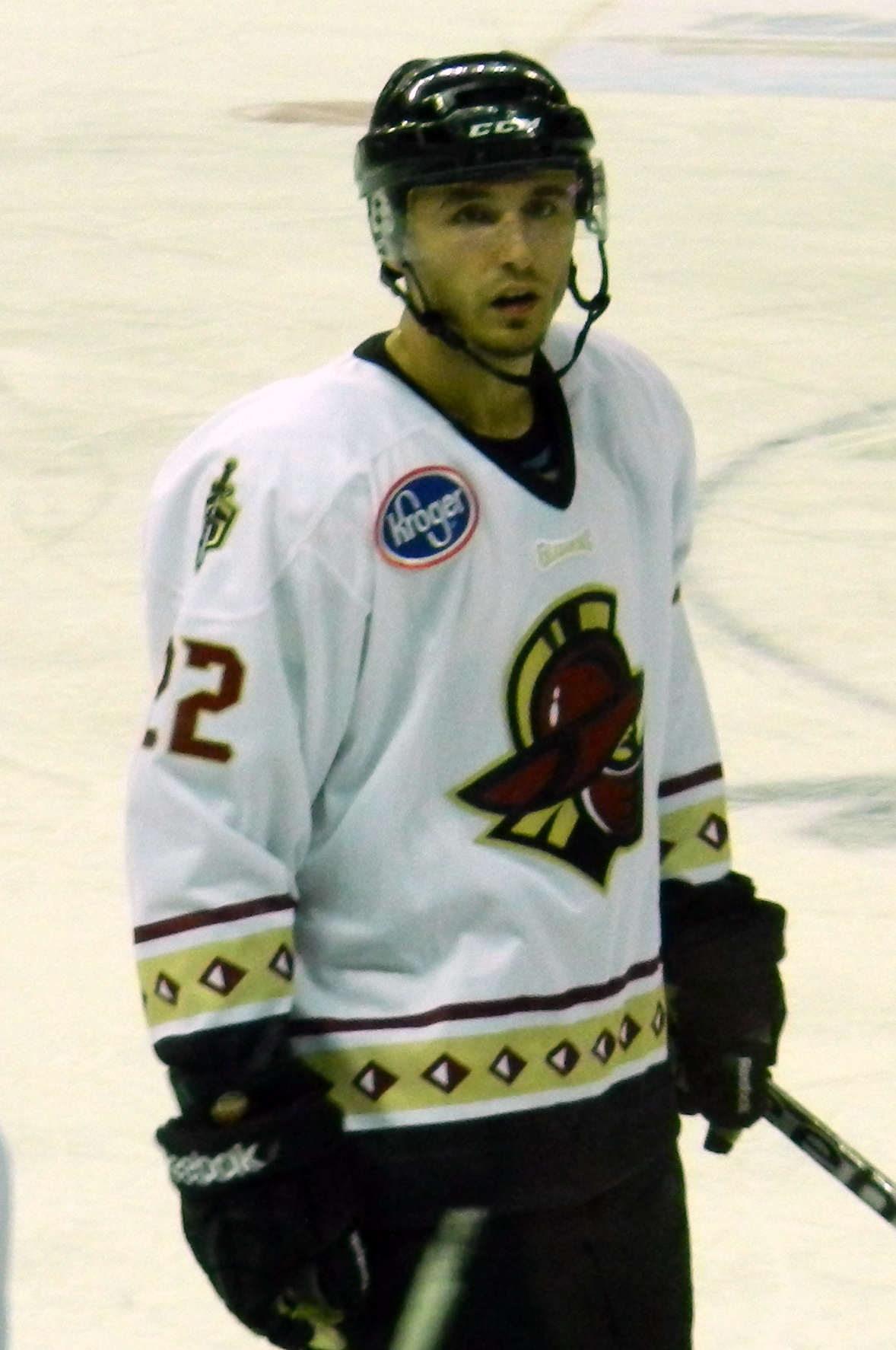
- Born: April 3, 1986 (age 38); Oak Park, Illinois
- Height: 5 ft 11 in (180 cm)
- Weight: 185 lb (84 kg; 13 st 3 lb)
- Position: Left wing
- Shoots: Right
- EIHL team: Nottingham Panthers
- NHL draft: Undrafted
- Playing career: 2009–present

Patrick Galivan (born April 3, 1986) is an American former professional ice hockey left winger who last played for the Nottingham Panthers of the Elite Ice Hockey League. In 2009 Galivan won the CCHA scoring title while playing for Western Michigan University and was named Second Team All-CCHA.

== Playing career ==
Galivan played for Western Michigan University for four seasons. In his sophomore year he was awarded the Rob Hodge Most Valuable Player award and the Vic Vanderberg Leading Scorer award.

Undrafted out of university, Galivan signed with the Chicago Wolves of the AHL. He split the 2009–10 season between the ECHL and the AHL.

Galivan retired from hockey after one season with the Nottingham Panthers in the EIHL.

== Career statistics ==
			Regular season					Playoffs
Season	Team	League	GP	G	A	Pts	PIM	GP	G	A	Pts	PIM
2003–04	Texarkana Bandits	NAHL	51	7	11	18	49	—	—	—	—	—
2004–05	Texarkana Bandits	NAHL	52	30	32	62	46	—	—	—	—	—
2005–06	Western Michigan Broncos	CCHA	21	1	1	2	2	—	—	—	—	—
2006–07	Western Michigan Broncos	CCHA	22	7	8	15	16	—	—	—	—	—
2007–08	Western Michigan Broncos	CCHA	38	8	23	31	44	—	—	—	—	—
2008–09	Western Michigan Broncos	CCHA	41	19	28	47	50	—	—	—	—	—
2009–10	Gwinnett Gladiators	ECHL	46	20	22	42	47	—	—	—	—	—
2009–10	Chicago Wolves	AHL	19	2	4	6	2	—	—	—	—	—
2010–11	Chicago Wolves	AHL	5	0	1	1	2	—	—	—	—	—
2010–11	Gwinnett Gladiators	ECHL	58	12	39	51	49	—	—	—	—	—
2011–12	Gwinnett Gladiators	ECHL	50	20	14	34	22	—	—	—	—	—
2012–13	Nottingham Panthers	EIHL	48	21	28	49	21	4	0	1	1	2
AHL totals			24	2	5	7	4	—	—	—	—	—

== Awards and honors ==
Award	Year
All-CCHA Second team	2008-09
