= Jordan Pearce =

American ice hockey player

- Born: October 10, 1986 (age 40) Anchorage, Alaska, U.S.
- Height: 6 ft 1 in (185 cm)
- Weight: 201 lb (91 kg; 14 st 5 lb)
- Position: Goaltender
- Caught: Left
- Played for: Grand Rapids Griffins
- NHL draft: Undrafted
- Playing career: 2009–2013

Jordan Paul Pearce (born October 10, 1986) is an American former professional ice hockey goaltender.

== Playing career ==
Pearce began his hockey career with the U.S. National Team Developmental Program and the Lincoln Stars of the USHL. While playing with the Lincoln Stars in 2004–05, Pearce finished with a record of 22–10–4 with 3.07 goals against average and a .897 save percentage which helped the Stars achieve a second-place tie in the USHL's Western Division.

After graduating from South Anchorage High School, he attended the University of Notre Dame and played for their men's ice hockey team in the CCHA for the following four years. In 2007–08 he was named CCHA Goaltender of the Year, and in 2008–09 he was a finalist for the CCHA MVP as well as being named the CCHA scholar-athlete of the year.

On April 10, 2009, it was announced that Pearce had signed a two-year entry-level contract with the Detroit Red Wings to begin with the 2009–10 season and that he had begun an amateur tryout with the Grand Rapids Griffins of the AHL, the minor league affiliate of the Detroit Red Wings.

On July 27, 2011, Pearce signed a two-year contract extension with the Detroit Red Wings of the NHL and split his final two seasons of play between the Grand Rapids Griffins of the AHL and the Toledo Walleye of the ECHL.

== Awards and honors ==
Award	Year
CCHA Goaltender of the Year	2007–08
CCHA All-Tournament Team	2009
CCHA Men's Ice Hockey Tournament MVP	2009

== Career statistics ==
			Regular season									Playoffs
Season	Team	League	GP	W	L	T/OT	MIN	GA	SO	GAA	SV%	GP	W	L	MIN	GA	SO	GAA	SV%
2004–05	Lincoln Stars	USHL	38	22	10	4	2227	114	0	3.07	.897	2	0	1	69	7	0	6.06
2005–06	University of Notre Dame	CCHA	9	4	4	0	442	24	1	3.25	.882	—	—	—	—	—	—	—	—
2006–07	University of Notre Dame	CCHA	3	2	1	0	179	6	1	2.01	.895	—	—	—	—	—	—	—	—
2007–08	University of Notre Dame	CCHA	43	23	15	4	2557	87	2	2.04	.914	—	—	—	—	—	—	—	—
2008–09	University of Notre Dame	CCHA	39	30	6	3	2326	65	8	1.68	.931	—	—	—	—	—	—	—	—
2008–09	Grand Rapids Griffins	AHL	1	0	1	0	59	5	0	5.11	.868	—	—	—	—	—	—	—	—
2009–10	Grand Rapids Griffins	AHL	5	1	2	0	236	15	0	3.82	.875	—	—	—	—	—	—	—	—
2009–10	Toledo Walleye	ECHL	37	15	16	2	2047	124	2	3.63	.891	4	1	3	247	16	0	3.88	.881
2010–11	Grand Rapids Griffins	AHL	44	20	15	5	2452	118	1	2.89	.908	—	—	—	—	—	—	—	—
2010–11	Toledo Walleye	ECHL	8	3	4	1	451	31	1	4.13	.883	—	—	—	—	—	—	—	—
2011–12	Grand Rapids Griffins	AHL	19	3	8	1	880	54	1	3.68	.871	—	—	—	—	—	—	—	—
2011–12	Toledo Walleye	ECHL	2	1	1	0	118	8	0	4.05	.879	—	—	—	—	—	—	—	—
2012–13	Grand Rapids Griffins	AHL	4	0	3	0	181	13	0	4.32	.847	—	—	—	—	—	—	—	—
2012–13	Toledo Walleye	ECHL	31	15	11	3	1696	78	2	2.76	.899	4	2	1	215	7	0	1.95	.936
AHL totals			73	24	29	6	3808	205	2	3.23	.894	—	—	—	—	—	—	—	—

Awards and achievements
Preceded by Jeff Lerg	CCHA Scholar-Athlete of the Year; 2008–09	Succeeded by Dion Knelsen
Preceded by Tim Miller	CCHA Most Valuable Player in Tournament; 2009	Succeeded by Shawn Hunwick
