= Brandon Svendsen =

American ice hockey player (born 1985)

- Born: April 11, 1985 (age 41) Roseville, Minnesota, U.S.
- Height: 5 ft 10 in (178 cm)
- Weight: 184 lb (83 kg; 13 st 2 lb)
- Position: Forward
- Shoots: Right
- AHL team Former teams: Rockford IceHogs; Bridgeport Sound Tigers
- NHL draft: Undrafted
- Playing career: 2009–present

Brandon Svendsen (born April 11, 1985) is an American professional ice hockey player who is currently playing for the Rockford Icehogs in the American Hockey League.

On November 7, 2010, he was signed as a free agent by the Bridgeport Sound Tigers.
