= Tyler Gron =

Canadian ice hockey player

- Born: September 7, 1989 (age 36) Spruce Grove, Alberta, Canada
- Height: 5 ft 11 in (180 cm)
- Weight: 201 lb (91 kg; 14 st 5 lb)
- Position: Centre
- Shoots: Right
- Oberliga Nord team Former teams: Hannover Indians; Bridgeport Sound Tigers; Worcester Sharks; Hockey Milano Rossoblu; Ravensburg Towerstars; Esbjerg Energy; Heilbronner Falken; Löwen Frankfurt; EC Kassel Huskies; Tölzer Löwen
- NHL draft: Undrafted
- Playing career: 2012–present

Tyler Gron (born September 7, 1989) is a Canadian professional ice hockey player. He is currently playing for the Hoechstadt Alligators in the Oberliga Nord.

Gron played junior hockey in the Alberta Junior Hockey League before committing to the Northern Michigan Wildcats men's ice hockey team, which competes in the NCAA's Division I in the Central Collegiate Hockey Association (CCHA) conference.

== Awards and honours ==
Award	Year
College
All-CCHA First Team	2011–12
ECHL Rookie of the Month (February)	2012–13
