= Tommy Dee =

American singer-songwriter

Tommy Donaldson (16 July 1933 in Vicker, Virginia – January 26, 2007 in Nashville, Tennessee), better known as Tommy Dee, was an American country singer, best known for recording "Three Stars" in 1959.

== Career ==
He started out as a disc jockey, who became a musician. After his success with "Three Stars", he still recorded for different record labels throughout the 1960s, with little success. He died on January 26, 2007.
