= Calle Ridderwall =

Swedish ice hockey player

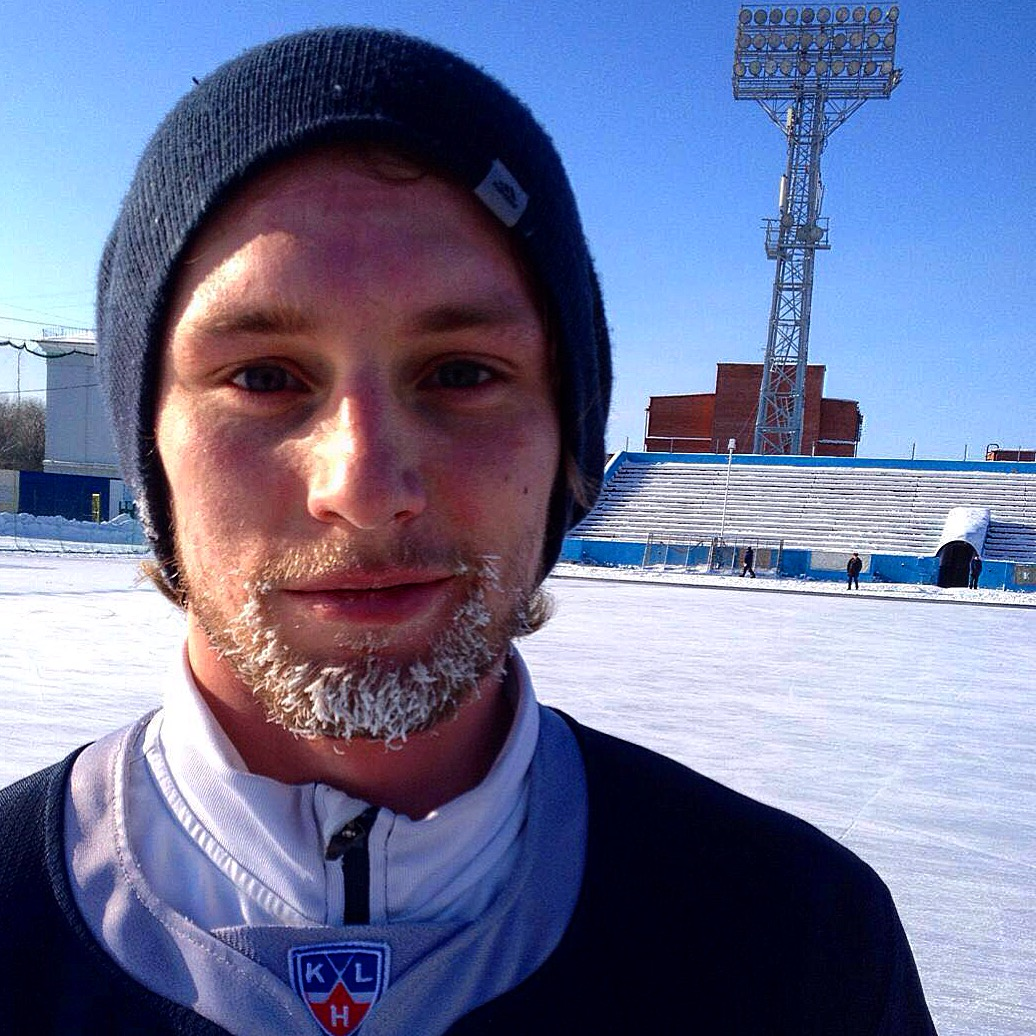
- Born: 28 May 1988 (age 38) Stockholm, Sweden
- Height: 6 ft 0 in (183 cm)
- Weight: 190 lb (86 kg; 13 st 8 lb)
- Position: Winger
- Shot: Left
- Played for: Providence Bruins; Düsseldorfer EG; HC Lev Praha; HV71; Sibir Novosibirsk; Djurgårdens IF
- NHL draft: Undrafted
- Playing career: 2011–2019

Calle Erik Ridderwall (born 28 May 1988) is a Swedish former professional ice hockey winger who most notably played in the Kontinental Hockey League (KHL) and Swedish Hockey League (SHL).

== Playing career ==
Undrafted, Ridderwall played amateur hockey in the United States before attending and participating in collegiate hockey with the University of Notre Dame in the CCHA. While attending the Mendoza College of Business, Ridderwall played in two Frozen Four championships. In the 2008 Frozen Four, Ridderwall scored the game winning goal in overtime to send the Fighting Irish to the semifinals.

Upon graduating from Notre Dame with a degree in finance, Ridderwall made his professional debut in the American Hockey League with the Providence Bruins.

After a single season within the AHL and without securing an NHL contract, Ridderwall returned to Europe and made his Deutsche Eishockey Liga debut playing with Düsseldorfer EG during the 2012–13 season. Ridderwall enjoyed a largely successful season with DEG, finishing the year with an impressive 22 goals and 58 points in only 51 games to lead the entire DEL in scoring. He was then signed to a lucrative Kontinental Hockey League contract with Czech club, HC Lev Praha on 15 April 2013.

On 8 July 2014, after only signing a two-year contract extension a month earlier but with HC Lev Praha announcing financial bankruptcy, Ridderwall announced his return to Sweden in signing a two-year contract with HV71.

After captaining Djurgårdens IF in his second season with the club in 2017–18, Ridderwall opted to return as a free agent to his former German club, Düsseldorfer EG of the DEL, agreeing to a three-year contract on 2 May 2018.

In the 2018–19 season, Ridderwall failed to match his previous offensive contributions from his first stint with Düsseldorfer, however still contributed with 28 points in 52 games. After a first round defeat to Augsburger Panther, Ridderwall after the season requested his contract to be terminated from the remaining two years, in announcing his retirement from professional hockey to take up business opportunities back in the United States.

== Personal life ==
Both Ridderwall's cousin Stefan Ridderwall and his uncle play hockey. Stefan played goaltender for Timrå IK in the Swedish Hockey League and his uncle Rolf Ridderwall won gold at the 1991 Men's World Ice Hockey Championships.

== Career statistics ==
| | | | Regular season | | | | | Playoffs |
| Season | Team | League | GP | G | A | Pts | PIM | GP | G | A | Pts | PIM |
|---|---|---|---|---|---|---|---|---|---|---|---|---|
| 2005–06 | Columbus Chill | MAHL | 76 | 52 | 66 | 118 | 65 | — | — | — | — | — |
| 2006–07 | Tri-City Storm | USHL | 60 | 27 | 35 | 62 | 36 | 9 | 3 | 5 | 8 | 4 |
| 2007–08 | Notre Dame Fighting Irish | CCHA | 39 | 5 | 2 | 7 | 20 | — | — | — | — | — |
| 2008–09 | Notre Dame Fighting Irish | CCHA | 40 | 17 | 15 | 32 | 20 | — | — | — | — | — |
| 2009–10 | Notre Dame Fighting Irish | CCHA | 38 | 19 | 8 | 27 | 51 | — | — | — | — | — |
| 2010–11 | Notre Dame Fighting Irish | CCHA | 39 | 16 | 9 | 25 | 27 | — | — | — | — | — |
| 2011–12 | Providence Bruins | AHL | 68 | 8 | 20 | 28 | 15 | — | — | — | — | — |
| 2012–13 | Düsseldorfer EG | DEL | 51 | 22 | 36 | 58 | 105 | — | — | — | — | — |
| 2013–14 | HC Lev Praha | KHL | 50 | 7 | 9 | 16 | 8 | 18 | 0 | 2 | 2 | 4 |
| 2014–15 | HV71 | SHL | 54 | 17 | 13 | 30 | 22 | 6 | 0 | 1 | 1 | 10 |
| 2015–16 | Sibir Novosibirsk | KHL | 57 | 7 | 20 | 27 | 12 | 10 | 2 | 1 | 3 | 2 |
| 2016–17 | Djurgårdens IF | SHL | 52 | 7 | 10 | 17 | 14 | 3 | 0 | 1 | 1 | 0 |
| 2017–18 | Djurgårdens IF | SHL | 52 | 10 | 10 | 20 | 12 | 11 | 1 | 3 | 4 | 4 |
| 2018–19 | Düsseldorfer EG | DEL | 52 | 6 | 22 | 28 | 30 | 7 | 0 | 1 | 1 | 0 |
| KHL totals | | | 107 | 14 | 29 | 43 | 20 | 28 | 2 | 3 | 5 | 6 |
| SHL totals | | | 158 | 34 | 33 | 67 | 48 | 20 | 1 | 5 | 6 | 14 |

== Awards and honors ==
| Award | Year |
|---|---|
College
| CCHA All-Tournament Team | 2009 |
