= Ryan Thang =

American ice hockey player (born 1987)

- Born: May 11, 1987 (age 39) Chicago, Illinois, USA
- Height: 6 ft 0 in (183 cm)
- Weight: 193 lb (88 kg; 13 st 11 lb)
- Position: Left wing
- Shot: Right
- Played for: Nashville Predators; Augsburger Panther; Mora IK; HIFK; High1
- NHL draft: 81st overall, 2007; Nashville Predators
- Playing career: 2010–2015

Ryan William Thang (born May 11, 1987) is an American professional ice hockey player. He was selected by the Nashville Predators in the 3rd round (81st overall) of the 2007 NHL entry draft. Thang was born in Chicago, and was a 3-year member and Senior captain of the Edina High School Hockey Team.

== Playing career ==
Thang played four seasons (2006–10) of college ice hockey at the University of Notre Dame with the Notre Dame Fighting Irish in the CCHA at the NCAA Division I level.

Thang was honored for his outstanding college play when he was named to the CCHA All-Rookie Team in his freshman year.

After signing a two-year entry-level contract with the Predators, Thang played each season primarily with AHL affiliate, the Milwaukee Admirals. In the 2011–12 season, Thang made his one-time NHL debut for the Predators in a 5–4 defeat against the Chicago Blackhawks on October 31, 2011.

On June 15, 2012, Thang signed his first European contract on a one-year deal with Augsburger Panther of the Deutsche Eishockey Liga for the 2012–13 season. During the year with the Panthers, Thang contributed 14 goals for 29 points in 50 games.

On June 20, 2013, Thang moved to Sweden, and signed a one-year contract with second division club, Mora IK.

== Career statistics ==
| | | | Regular season | | | | | Playoffs |
| Season | Team | League | GP | G | A | Pts | PIM | GP | G | A | Pts | PIM |
|---|---|---|---|---|---|---|---|---|---|---|---|---|
| 2004–05 | Sioux Falls Stampede | USHL | 58 | 9 | 22 | 31 | 45 | — | — | — | — | — |
| 2005–06 | Sioux Falls Stampede | USHL | 32 | 8 | 14 | 22 | 52 | — | — | — | — | — |
| 2005–06 | Omaha Lancers | USHL | 25 | 15 | 15 | 30 | 26 | 5 | 2 | 1 | 3 | 2 |
| 2006–07 | Notre Dame | CCHA | 42 | 20 | 21 | 41 | 22 | — | — | — | — | — |
| 2007–08 | Notre Dame | CCHA | 47 | 18 | 14 | 32 | 48 | — | — | — | — | — |
| 2008–09 | Notre Dame | CCHA | 33 | 10 | 9 | 19 | 36 | — | — | — | — | — |
| 2009–10 | Notre Dame | CCHA | 37 | 9 | 14 | 23 | 55 | — | — | — | — | — |
| 2009–10 | Milwaukee Admirals | AHL | 12 | 3 | 3 | 6 | 4 | 7 | 1 | 3 | 4 | 2 |
| 2010–11 | Milwaukee Admirals | AHL | 78 | 14 | 27 | 41 | 32 | 13 | 5 | 8 | 13 | 10 |
| 2011–12 | Milwaukee Admirals | AHL | 75 | 18 | 20 | 38 | 44 | 3 | 0 | 0 | 0 | 2 |
| 2011–12 | Nashville Predators | NHL | 1 | 0 | 0 | 0 | 0 | — | — | — | — | — |
| 2012–13 | Augsburger Panther | DEL | 50 | 14 | 15 | 29 | 34 | 2 | 0 | 0 | 0 | 2 |
| 2013–14 | Mora IK | Allsv | 25 | 5 | 7 | 12 | 28 | — | — | — | — | — |
| 2013–14 | HIFK | Liiga | 28 | 3 | 4 | 7 | 20 | — | — | — | — | — |
| 2014–15 | High1 | AL | 48 | 26 | 46 | 72 | 92 | 6 | 4 | 2 | 6 | 6 |
| NHL totals | | | 1 | 0 | 0 | 0 | 0 | — | — | — | — | — |

== Awards and honours ==
| Award | Year |
|---|---|
College
| All-CCHA Rookie Team | 2006–07 |
