= 2006 CCHA men's ice hockey tournament =

2006 CCHA Men's ice hockey tournament
- Dates: March 3–18, 2006
- Teams: 12
- Finals site: Joe Louis Arena; Detroit, Michigan
- Champions: Michigan State (11th title)
- Winning coach: Rick Comley (3rd title)
- MVP: Jeff Lerg (Michigan State)
- CCHA Men's Ice Hockey Tournaments

The 2006 CCHA Men's Ice Hockey Tournament was the 35th CCHA Men's Ice Hockey Tournament. It was played between March 3 and March 18, 2006. Opening round and quarterfinal games were played at campus sites, while the semifinals, third place, and championship games were played at Joe Louis Arena in Detroit, Michigan. By winning the tournament, Michigan State won the Mason Cup and received the Central Collegiate Hockey Association's automatic bid to the 2006 NCAA Division I Men's Ice Hockey Tournament.

== Conference standings ==
Note: GP = Games played; W = Wins; L = Losses; T = Ties; PTS = Points; GF = Goals For; GA = Goals Against

2005–06 Central Collegiate Hockey Association standings
	Conference							Overall					
	GP	W	L	T	PTS	GF	GA	GP	W	L	T	GF	GA
#9 Miami†	28	20	6	2	42	96	57	39	26	9	4	122	79
#6 Michigan State*	28	14	7	7	35	82	66	45	25	12	8	138	103
#12 Michigan	28	13	10	5	31	102	82	41	21	15	5	147	125
Northern Michigan	28	14	12	2	30	83	79	40	22	16	2	118	104
Nebraska-Omaha	28	12	10	6	30	99	90	41	20	15	6	146	136
Lake Superior State	28	11	12	5	27	75	70	36	15	14	7	93	84
Ferris State	28	10	11	7	27	77	81	40	17	15	8	121	114
Notre Dame	28	11	13	4	26	75	76	36	13	19	4	89	98
Alaska-Fairbanks	28	11	13	4	26	64	79	39	18	16	5	92	105
Ohio State	28	11	14	3	25	72	71	39	15	19	5	97	92
Western Michigan	28	7	16	5	19	69	115	40	10	24	6	97	160
Bowling Green	28	8	18	2	18	83	111	38	13	23	2	124	147
Championship: Michigan State † indicates conference regular season champion * indicates conference tournament champion Final rankings: USA Today/USA Hockey Magazine Top 15 Poll

== Bracket ==
First round March 3–4
5	Nebraska-Omaha	4	4	—
12	Bowling Green	2	2	—
6	Lake Superior State	2	0	—
11	Western Michigan	3*	1	—
7	Ferris State	3	2	—
10	Ohio State	0	1	—
8	Notre Dame	1	0	—
9	Alaska-Fairbanks	3	1	—

Quarterfinals; March 10–12
1	Miami	4	5*	—
11	Western Michigan	1	4	—
2	Michigan State	1	6	7
9	Alaska-Fairbanks	2	1	4
3	Michigan	6	3	—
7	Ferris State	4	2	—
4	Northern Michigan	4	3	—
5	Nebraska-Omaha	1	2	—

Semifinals; March 17
1	Miami	5
4	Northern Michigan	2
2	Michigan State	4
3	Michigan	1

Championship; March 18
1	Miami	1
2	Michigan State	2
Third place
3	Michigan	3
4	Northern Michigan	2

Note: * denotes overtime period(s)

=== First round ===
==== (5) Nebraska-Omaha vs. (12) Bowling Green ====
March 3	Nebraska-Omaha	4 – 2	Bowling Green	Qwest Center Omaha	Recap
Adam Bartholomay - 10:11		First period	No scoring
Tomas Klempa - sh - 03:26; Bryan Marshall - 06:04		Second period	13:14 - pp - Jonathan Matsumoto
Jason Krischuk - en - 19:01		Third period	11:12 - pp - Jonathan Matsumoto
Jerad Kaufmann ( 28 saves / 30 shots )		Goalie stats	Jimmy Spratt ( 18 saves / 21 shots )

March 4	Nebraska-Omaha	4 – 2	Bowling Green	Qwest Center Omaha	Recap
No Scoring		First period	No scoring
Bryan Marshall - pp - 08:50; Jason Krischuk - 12:54		Second period	No scoring
Scott Parse - 08:34; Adam Bartholomay - en - 19:57		Third period	04:34 - John Mazzei; 19:49 - Mike Falk
Jerad Kaufmann ( 29 saves / 31 shots )		Goalie stats	Jon Horrell ( 42 saves / 45 shots )

Nebraska-Omaha won series 2–0

==== (6) Lake Superior State vs. (11) Western Michigan ====
March 3	Lake Superior State	2 – 3	OT	Western Michigan	Taffy Abel Arena	Recap
Trent Campbell - 12:20		First period		14:49 - Jason Moul
Nathan Ward - pp - 05:36		Second period		19:28 - pp - Ryan Mahrle
No scoring		Third period		No scoring
No scoring		First overtime period		11:46 - Brent Walton
Jeff Jakaitis ( 24 saves / 27 shots )		Goalie stats		Daniel Bellissimo ( 32 saves / 34 shots )

March 4	Lake Superior State	0 – 1	Western Michigan	Taffy Abel Arena	Recap
No Scoring		First period	No scoring
No scoring		Second period	No scoring
No scoring		Third period	14:00 - pp - Mike Erickson
Jeff Jakaitis ( 26 saves / 27 shots )		Goalie stats	Daniel Bellissimo ( 31 saves / 31 shots )

Western Michigan won series 2–0

==== (7) Ferris State vs. (10) Ohio State ====
March 3	Ferris State	3 – 0	Ohio State	Ewigleben Arena	Recap
Matt Frank - 02:02; Dan Riedel - 09:23		First period	No scoring
No scoring		Second period	No scoring
Justin Lewandowski - en - 19:38		Third period	No scoring
Mitch O'Keefe ( 30 saves / 30 shots )		Goalie stats	Dave Caruso ( 23 saves / 25 shots )

March 4	Ferris State	2 – 1	Ohio State	Ewigleben Arena	Recap
No Scoring		First period	No scoring
No scoring		Second period	No scoring
Adam Miller - pp - 05:18; Dan Riedel - pp - 07:09		Third period	11:42 - pp - Kenny Bernard
Mitch O'Keefe ( 44 saves / 45 shots )		Goalie stats	Dave Caruso ( 28 saves / 30 shots )

Ferris State won series 2–0

==== (8) Notre Dame vs. (9) Alaska-Fairbanks ====
March 3	Notre Dame	1 – 3	Alaska-Fairbanks	Joyce Center	Recap
Dan VeNard - 13:31		First period	No scoring
No scoring		Second period	05:51 - Nathan Fornataro
No scoring		Third period	11:55 - Kelly Czuy; 19:23 - en - Lucas Burnett
David Brown ( 19 saves / 21 shots )		Goalie stats	Wylie Rogers ( 22 saves / 23 shots )

March 4	Notre Dame	0 – 1	Alaska-Fairbanks	Joyce Center	Recap
No Scoring		First period	No scoring
No scoring		Second period	19:04 - pp - Nathan Fornataro
No scoring		Third period	No scoring
David Brown ( 6 saves / 6 shots ) Jordan Pearce ( 15 saves / 16 shots )		Goalie stats	Wylie Rogers ( 39 saves / 39 shots )

Alaska-Fairbanks won series 2–0

=== Quarterfinals ===
==== (1) Miami vs. (11) Western Michigan ====
March 10	Miami	4 – 1	Western Michigan	Goggin Ice Arena	Recap
Alec Martinez - pp - 17:55		First period	No scoring
Ryan Jones - 08:48; Nathan Davis - pp - 18:23		Second period	No scoring
Matt Christie - en sh - 19:17		Third period	03:19 - Brent Walton
Charlie Effinger ( 18 saves / 19 shots )		Goalie stats	Daniel Bellissimo ( 33 saves / 36 shots )

March 11	Miami	5 – 4	OT	Western Michigan	Goggin Ice Arena	Recap
Alec Martinez - 00:59		First period		04:56 - Daryl Moore; 12:14 - pp - Daryl Moore
Justin Mercier - 06:16; Matt Davis - pp - 14:01		Second period		No scoring
Marty Guerin - 16:29		Third period		03:16 - pp - Mike Erickson; 12:12 - Reid Yantzi
Alec Martinez - 17:00		First overtime period		No scoring
Jeff Zatkoff ( 29 saves / 33 shots )		Goalie stats		Daniel Bellissimo ( 40 saves / 45 shots )

Miami won series 2–0

==== (2) Michigan State vs. (9) Alaska-Fairbanks ====
March 10	Michigan State	1 – 2	Alaska-Fairbanks	Munn Ice Arena	Recap
No Scoring		First period	05:59 - Trevor Hyatt
David Booth - pp - 19:22		Second period	01:57 - Aaron Lee
No scoring		Third period	No scoring
Jeff Lerg ( 27 saves / 29 shots )		Goalie stats	Wylie Rogers ( 36 saves / 37 shots )

March 11	Michigan State	6 – 1	Alaska-Fairbanks	Munn Ice Arena	Recap
Jim McKenzie - pp - 10:09		First period	No scoring
Chris Mueller - 11:29; Drew Miller - 12:22; Tim Crowder - pp - 19:11; Bryan Lerg - pp - 19:37		Second period	No scoring
Chris Lawrence - pp - 00:57		Third period	07:51 - pp - Kyle Jones
Jeff Lerg ( 30 saves / 31 shots )		Goalie stats	Wylie Rogers ( 16 saves / 21 shots ) Chad Johnson ( 2 saves / 3 shots )

March 12	Michigan State	7 – 4	Alaska-Fairbanks	Munn Ice Arena	Recap
Chris Mueller - 01:40; Drew Miller - sh - 02:50		First period	01:10 - pp - Kelly Czuy
Ethan Graham - 04:30; David Booth - 05:23; Drew Miller - 15:44		Second period	05:01 - Aaron Lee
Corey Potter - pp - 04:43; Drew Miller - en - 18:03		Third period	00:23 - pp - Aaron Lee; 09:58 - Braden Walls
Jeff Lerg ( 23 saves / 27 shots )		Goalie stats	Wylie Rogers ( 38 saves / 44 shots )

Michigan State won series 2–1

==== (3) Michigan vs. (7) Ferris State ====
March 10	Michigan	6 – 4	Ferris State	Yost Ice Arena	Recap
T. J. Hensick - 07:47; Andrew Ebbett - 08:51		First period	12:19 - Matt Verdone
Andrew Ebbett - 06:56; Brandon Kaleniecki - pp - 10:38; Kevin Porter - 14:17		Second period	14:41 - Eric Vesely
Travis Turnbull - 16:20		Third period	09:44 - pp - Mark Bomersback; 10:24 - Dan Riedel
Noah Ruden ( 28 saves / 32 shots )		Goalie stats	Mitch O'Keefe ( 21 saves / 27 shots )

March 11	Michigan	3 – 2	Ferris State	Yost Ice Arena	Recap
No Scoring		First period	No scoring
Brandon Kaleniecki - pp - 00:31; T. J. Hensick - pp - 13:26		Second period	08:13 - Eric Vesely; 09:17 - pp - Greg Rallo
Jack Johnson - 04:11		Third period	No scoring
Noah Ruden ( 20 saves / 22 shots )		Goalie stats	Mitch O'Keefe ( 29 saves / 32 shots )

Michigan won series 2–0

==== (4) Northern Michigan vs. (5) Nebraska-Omaha ====
March 10	Northern Michigan	4 – 1	Nebraska-Omaha	Berry Events Center	Recap
Matt Siddall - pp - 04:06; Dirk Southern - pp - 17:57		First period	16:22 - pp - Bill Thomas
Rob Lehtinen - 08:40		Second period	No scoring
Rob Lehtinen - 07:00		Third period	No scoring
Bill Zaniboni ( 25 saves / 26 shots )		Goalie stats	Jerad Kaufmann ( 14 saves / 18 shots )

March 11	Northern Michigan	3 – 2	Nebraska-Omaha	Berry Events Center	Recap
No Scoring		First period	No scoring
Pat Bateman - 01:41; Andrew Contois - pp - 05:22; Andrew Contois - 12:03		Second period	No scoring
No scoring		Third period	12:03 - pp - Kaleb Betts; 15:21 - pp - Alex Nikiforuk
Bill Zaniboni ( 28 saves / 30 shots )		Goalie stats	Jerad Kaufmann ( 15 saves / 18 shots )

Northern Michigan won series 2–0

=== Semifinals ===
==== (1) Miami vs. (4) Northern Michigan ====
March 17	Miami	5 – 2	Northern Michigan	Joe Louis Arena	Recap
No Scoring		First period	14:14 - Mike Santorelli; 16:56 - Pat Bateman
Brian Kaufman - 02:49; Ryan Jones - 11:28; Nathan Davis - 17:05		Second period	No scoring
Nino Musitelli - 07:03; Stephen Dennis - en - 19:45		Third period	No scoring
Charlie Effinger ( 19 saves / 21 shots )		Goalie stats	Bill Zaniboni ( 13 saves / 17 shots )

==== (2) Michigan State vs. (3) Michigan ====
March 17	Michigan State	4 – 1	Michigan	Joe Louis Arena	Recap
Tim Crowder - pp - 08:46; Zak McClellan - 16:45		First period	07:26 - Andrew Ebbett
No scoring		Second period	No scoring
Bryan Lerg - 17:44; Tim Crowder - pp - 19:28		Third period	No scoring
Jeff Lerg ( 25 saves / 26 shots )		Goalie stats	Noah Ruden ( 20 saves / 24 shots )

=== Third place ===
==== (3) Michigan vs. (4) Northern Michigan ====
March 18	Michigan	3 – 2	Northern Michigan	Joe Louis Arena	Recap
Matt Hunwick - pp - 10:54		First period	05:30 - Matt Ciancio
T. J. Hensick - 16:01		Second period	16:16 - Darin Olver
Matt Hunwick - 08:19		Third period	No scoring
Noah Ruden ( 29 saves / 31 shots )		Goalie stats	Bill Zaniboni ( 39 saves / 42 shots )

=== Championship ===
==== (1) Miami vs. (2) Michigan State ====
March 18	Miami	1 – 2	Michigan State	Joe Louis Arena	Recap
Ryan Jones - 14:33		First period	14:13 - pp - Justin Abdelkader
No scoring		Second period	05:52 - David Booth
No scoring		Third period	No scoring
Jeff Zatkoff ( 32 saves / 34 shots )		Goalie stats	Jeff Lerg ( 22 saves / 23 shots )

== Tournament awards ==
=== All-Tournament Team ===
- F Drew Miller (Michigan State)
- F Ryan Jones (Miami)
- F Tim Crowder (Michigan State)
- D Matt Hunwick (Michigan)
- D Andy Greene (Miami)
- G Jeff Lerg* (Michigan State)

* Most Valuable Player(s)
