= Drew Miller =

American ice hockey player (born 1984)

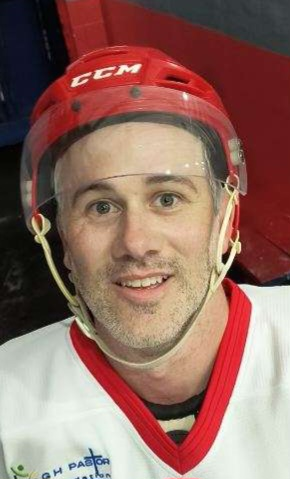
- Miller in 2023
- Born: February 17, 1984 (age 42) Dover, New Jersey, U.S.
- Height: 6 ft 2 in (188 cm)
- Weight: 180 lb (82 kg; 12 st 12 lb)
- Position: Left wing
- Shot: Left
- Played for: Anaheim Ducks; Tampa Bay Lightning; Detroit Red Wings; Braehead Clan; Brynäs IF
- NHL draft: 186th overall, 2003; Mighty Ducks of Anaheim
- Playing career: 2006–2018

Drew Miller (born February 17, 1984) is an American former professional ice hockey winger. He played in the National Hockey League (NHL) with the Anaheim Ducks, Tampa Bay Lightning and Detroit Red Wings.

Miller was drafted in the sixth round, 186th overall, in the 2003 NHL entry draft and made his NHL debut on April 19, 2007, playing with the Anaheim Ducks against the Minnesota Wild. He is the younger brother of former NHL goaltender Ryan Miller.

== Playing career ==
=== Junior ===
Born in Dover, New Jersey and raised in East Lansing, Michigan, Miller played junior hockey for the now-defunct Capital Centre Pride of the North American Hockey League (NAHL) from 2001–2003, totaling 32 goals and 28 assists for 60 points in 102 games. Early in the 2002–03 season, he graduated to the United States Hockey League (USHL).

At 17, Miller played 49 games for the River City Lancers (now known as the Omaha Lancers) of the USHL in the 2002–03 season, posting 14 goals and 11 assists for 25 points. He scored nine points in 11 playoff games to help lead the Lancers to the USHL Finals, where they lost three games to one to the Lincoln Stars. Miller played with fellow NHLers Matt Carle and Paul Stastny and was named to the USHL All-Star team.

Miller spent the next three years playing for the Michigan State Spartans of the Central Collegiate Hockey Association (CCHA). He scored his first collegiate goal on January 2, 2004, against the Northern Michigan University Wildcats. The winger improved his point totals in each of his three seasons at Michigan State, scoring 10, 33 and 43 points in 41, 40 and 44 games, respectively. In his last season with the Spartans, Miller was named the team's MVP and the CCHA's Best Defensive Forward. He was also named to the Association's All-Tournament Team after helping Michigan State capture the CCHA title.

Miller was drafted by the then Mighty Ducks of Anaheim in the sixth round of the 2003 NHL entry draft, 186th overall.

=== Professional ===
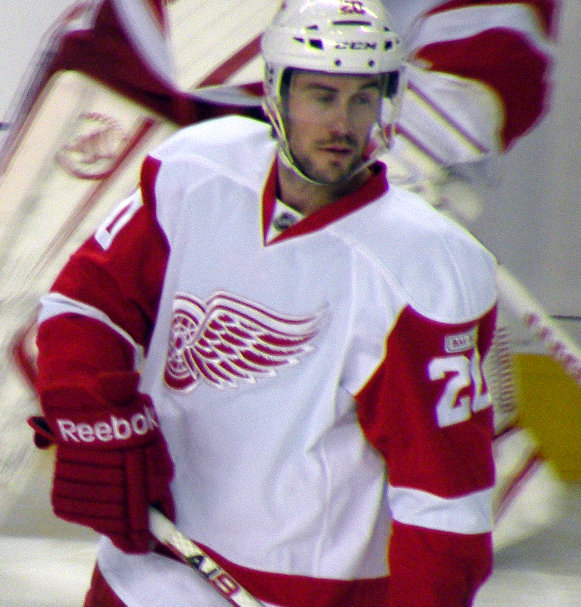
Miller warming up with Detroit during the 2011–12 NHL season

==== Anaheim Ducks ====
After leading the Spartans in both points and as captain in the 2005–06 season, Miller signed a two-year entry-level contract with the Ducks on May 4, 2006. He joined Anaheim's AHL affiliate, the Portland Pirates, during their second round series against the Hartford Wolf Pack, playing in one game.

The next season, he suited up for 79 matches with the Pirates, scoring 16 goals and totaling 20 assists for 36 points to place third on the team.

In 2007, Miller once again moved up to a higher league after completing the regular season with another team. On April 16, Miller was recalled from Portland by Anaheim. Three days later, he made his Ducks and NHL debut at the Honda Center, playing in what would be the final game of the Western Conference Quarterfinal series against the Minnesota Wild.

Coach Randy Carlyle placed the left winger on the Ducks' top line, alongside 2007 All-Stars Andy McDonald and Teemu Selänne, to fill in for the injured Chris Kunitz. In game one, Miller forced a turnover that Selanne and McDonald capitalized on for the Ducks' first goal of the series. He would also play in the Stanley Cup Final and would go on to win his first Stanley Cup after just three games in the NHL.

==== Tampa Bay Lightning ====
He would spend two more seasons in the Ducks organization before being traded to the Tampa Bay Lightning in the summer of 2009 for Russian winger Evgeny Artyukhin. Miller went scoreless in 14 games with the Lightning that season.

==== Detroit Red Wings ====
On November 10, 2009, Miller was put on waivers by the Lightning and was subsequently claimed by the Detroit Red Wings. He made his Red Wings debut on November 12 against the Vancouver Canucks, recording 11:33 minutes of ice time. He scored his first goal in a Detroit uniform on November 23 against the Nashville Predators. Originally brought into Detroit to replace injured players on a temporary basis, he effectively outplayed other young members of the Red Wings. He has since filled in comfortably playing a variety of roles. He finished the 2009–10 season with 10 goals, and 9 assists (zero points with the Lightning) in 80 games split between the Lightning and Red Wings.

During the summer of 2010 the Red Wings re-signed Miller to a one-year $650,000 contract. During the 2010–11 season Miller played 68 games, scoring 10 goals, and eight assists. He played the role of a grinder, spending time primarily on the third and fourth lines, while also contributing on the penalty kill. Most games Miller would play on a line with Justin Abdelkader, Darren Helm, Patrick Eaves and/or veteran Kris Draper. This would alter game to game depending on injuries, and or the matchups coach Mike Babcock saw fit in that particular game.

Following his season, the Red Wings rewarded Miller's efforts by re-signing him to a two-year contract worth $1.675 million on July 1. Each year has an annual cap hit of $837,500. On February 19, 2012, Miller scored his career high 12th goal of the regular season against the San Jose Sharks in a 3–2 Red Wings victory.

During the 2012 NHL lockout, Miller signed with the British Elite Ice Hockey League club Braehead Clan.

On June 29, 2013, Miller signed a three-year, $4.05 million contract extension with the Detroit Red Wings.

On March 31, 2015, Miller suffered two lacerations, one on his right cheek, and one above his right eye, after the skate of Mark Stone of the Ottawa Senators struck him in the face. The four-inch long cut required 60 stitches to close the lacerations. He did not sustain damage to his eye or his vision.

Miller finished the 2014–15 season with five goals and eights assists in 82 games. He led all NHL forwards and established a career high in blocked shots during the regular season with 99. This is the highest single-season total in blocked shots by a forward in the past seven seasons. He has led all Red Wings forwards in blocked shots for five straight seasons.

On December 3, 2015, Miller suffered a broken jaw in a game against the Arizona Coyotes. He returned on January 7, 2016, after missing 14 games, however, the comeback lasted less than two games as Miller was hurt in the third period against the Anaheim Ducks on January 10, by a hit by Shea Theodore. It was announced that Miller had to have left ACL reconstruction in addition to meniscus repair and would be out for 4 to 6 months. During the 2015–16 season, Miller recorded one goal and one assist in 28 games. On June 27, 2016, the Red Wings signed Miller to a one-year contract extension. The Red Wings chose not to re-sign Miller following the conclusion of his contract, making him an unrestricted free agent after 8 years with the organization.

On September 11, 2017, as a free agent over the summer, the Chicago Blackhawks signed Miller to a professional tryout. On September 21, 2017, Miller was released from the Blackhawks roster following training camp. Midway into the 2017–18 season, Miller signed for the remainder of the campaign with Swedish outfit, Brynäs IF of the SHL, on November 20, 2017.

== Personal life ==
Miller comes from a long line of hockey players, as he is the tenth member of his family to play the sport for Michigan State. His best-known relative is older brother and former NHL goaltender Ryan Miller. He is also the cousin of former NHL players Kip, Kevin and Kelly Miller.

Miller has always been involved with the communities in which he plays, taking part in programs such as Teams for Toys, DARE and the Special Olympics. He even created the Spartan Buddy Program, which enabled MSU athletes to make regular visits to local pediatric hospital patients.

== Career statistics ==
			Regular season					Playoffs
Season	Team	League	GP	G	A	Pts	PIM	GP	G	A	Pts	PIM
2000–01	Honeybaked U18 AAA	MWEHL	26	12	13	25	20	—	—	—	—	—
2000–01	Capital Centre Pride	NAHL	37	4	3	7	22	—	—	—	—	—
2001–02	Capital Centre Pride	NAHL	54	18	16	34	56	—	—	—	—	—
2002–03	Capital Centre Pride	NAHL	11	10	9	19	—	—	—	—	—	—
2002–03	River City Lancers	USHL	49	14	11	25	26	11	5	4	9	6
2003–04	Michigan State University	CCHA	41	4	6	10	39	—	—	—	—	—
2004–05	Michigan State University	CCHA	40	17	16	33	20	—	—	—	—	—
2005–06	Michigan State University	CCHA	44	18	25	43	30	—	—	—	—	—
2005–06	Portland Pirates	AHL	—	—	—	—	—	1	0	0	0	0
2006–07	Portland Pirates	AHL	79	16	20	36	51	—	—	—	—	—
2006–07	Anaheim Ducks	NHL	—	—	—	—	—	3	0	0	0	2
2007–08	Anaheim Ducks	NHL	26	2	3	5	6	—	—	—	—	—
2007–08	Portland Pirates	AHL	31	16	20	36	12	16	1	7	8	12
2008–09	Anaheim Ducks	NHL	27	4	6	10	17	13	2	1	3	2
2008–09	Iowa Chops	AHL	53	23	15	38	10	—	—	—	—	—
2009–10	Tampa Bay Lightning	NHL	14	0	0	0	2	—	—	—	—	—
2009–10	Detroit Red Wings	NHL	66	10	9	19	10	12	1	1	2	4
2010–11	Detroit Red Wings	NHL	67	10	8	18	13	9	1	1	2	4
2011–12	Detroit Red Wings	NHL	80	14	11	25	20	5	0	1	1	2
2012–13	Braehead Clan	EIHL	23	15	15	30	7	—	—	—	—	—
2012–13	Detroit Red Wings	NHL	44	4	4	8	2	6	1	1	2	2
2013–14	Detroit Red Wings	NHL	82	7	8	15	21	5	0	1	1	0
2014–15	Detroit Red Wings	NHL	82	5	8	13	25	7	1	1	2	2
2015–16	Detroit Red Wings	NHL	28	1	1	2	2	—	—	—	—	—
2016–17	Detroit Red Wings	NHL	55	5	2	7	18	—	—	—	—	—
2016–17	Grand Rapids Griffins	AHL	7	2	1	3	0	—	—	—	—	—
2017–18	Brynäs IF	SHL	29	5	5	10	6	—	—	—	—	—
NHL totals			571	62	60	122	136	60	6	7	13	18

== Awards and honors ==
Award	Year
CCHA All-Tournament Team	2006
Braehead Clan Wall of Fame	2016
Stanley Cup champion	2007

Stanley Cup win 2007: By playing in the Cup final, Miller automatically qualified to have his name engraved on the Cup, and was included in the Stanley Cup picture.

Awards and achievements
Preceded by Eric Nystrom	CCHA Best Defensive Forward; 2005–06	Succeeded by Nathan Davis
Preceded by Bo Cheesman	Ilitch Humanitarian Award; 2005–06	Succeeded by Tim Cook
