= Tim Kennedy (ice hockey) =

American ice hockey player (born 1986)

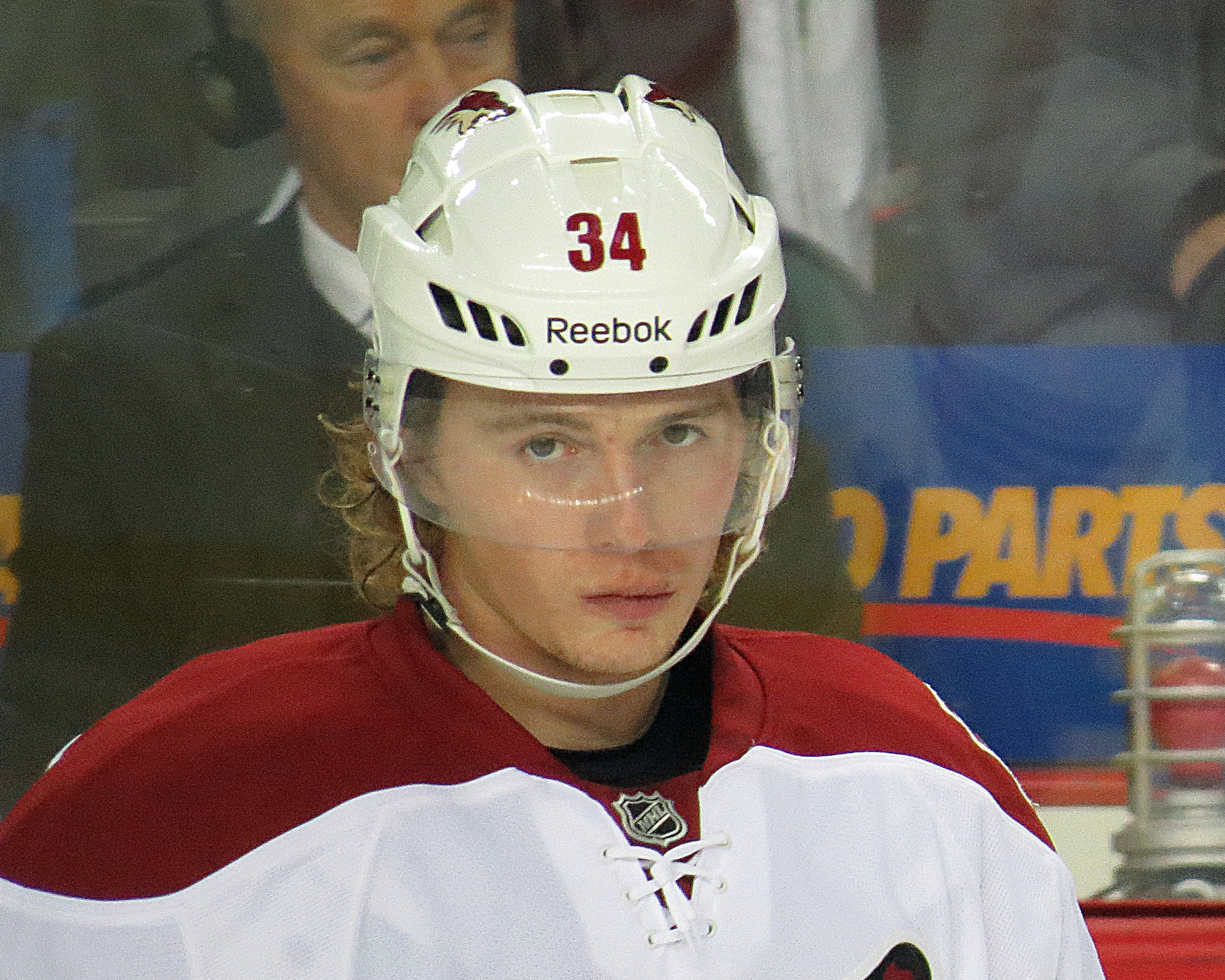
- Kennedy in 2013
- Born: April 30, 1986 (age 40) Buffalo, New York, U.S.
- Height: 5 ft 10 in (178 cm)
- Weight: 175 lb (79 kg; 12 st 7 lb)
- Position: Left wing
- Shot: Left
- Played for: Buffalo Sabres; Florida Panthers; San Jose Sharks; Phoenix Coyotes; Neftkhimik Nizhnekamsk; Jokerit; Luleå HF
- National team: United States
- NHL draft: 181st overall, 2005; Washington Capitals
- Playing career: 2008–2018

Timothy J. Kennedy (born April 30, 1986) is an American former professional ice hockey forward, who played in the National Hockey League (NHL) with the Buffalo Sabres, Florida Panthers, San Jose Sharks and the Phoenix Coyotes. He currently serves as the director of player development for the Buffalo Sabres.

== Playing career ==
=== Amateur ===
Kennedy played several years of his youth career with the Buffalo Regals, where he led the team with future Michigan State University teammate Chris Mueller. He also attended Bishop Timon - St. Jude High School. He played for several years on the Western Division's hockey team in the Empire State Games where his teams won gold in 2002 and 2003. In 2003, Kennedy was offered a contract with the Ontario Hockey League, but declined because he would have been unable to play NCAA college hockey. He was later drafted by the Sioux City Musketeers, a team in the United States Hockey League. Kennedy was actively recruited by major college hockey programs including Colorado College, Ohio State, and Boston College, ultimately accepting a scholarship to Michigan State, where he was a member of 2007 NCAA Championship team. He contributed one goal in the championship game against Boston College and assisted Justin Abdelkader's game-winning goal.

=== Professional ===
Kennedy was drafted in the sixth round, 181st overall, in the 2005 NHL entry draft by the Washington Capitals but was traded to the Buffalo Sabres the same day in exchange for Buffalo's sixth-round draft pick in 2006 (Mathieu Perreault).

On June 1, 2008, Kennedy signed a two-year entry-level contract with the Sabres. He spent the beginning of the 2008–09 season playing for the Portland Pirates of the American Hockey League (AHL). On December 27, 2008, the Sabres called him up from Portland, giving him the opportunity to play his first NHL game in his hometown in Buffalo. The game was a shoot-out win over the New York Islanders.

Kennedy played the entire 2009–10 season in Buffalo, scoring 10 goals and 16 assists, for 26 total points in 78 games in the regular season, plus 1 goal and 2 assists in 6 playoff games. Kennedy's entry-level contract expired at the end of the season, resulting in a contract dispute with the Sabres. In arbitration, Kennedy was awarded a $1,000,000 contract. On August 2, the Sabres waived Kennedy. Kennedy cleared waivers the next day, at which point Buffalo bought out Kennedy's contract for $333,333. The reported monetary difference between Kennedy's request and the Sabres' contract offer before arbitration was $50,000.

On August 30, 2010, Kennedy signed a one-year contract with the New York Rangers for a reported $550,000. At the start of the season and no room on the Rangers roster, Kennedy was waived again, on October 5, and was then sent to the Rangers' AHL affiliate, the Hartford Wolf Pack, on October 13. On February 26, 2011, Kennedy was traded by the Rangers along with a third round pick to the Florida Panthers in exchange for Bryan McCabe.

On January 26, 2012, he was traded by Florida to the San Jose Sharks in exchange for Sean Sullivan.

The following year, on July 11, 2013, Kennedy signed as a free agent to a one-year, two-way deal with the Phoenix Coyotes. In the 2013–14 season, Kennedy appeared in 37 games for the Coyotes, his most in the NHL since 2010. As a depth forward, he contributed from the lower lines with 2 goals and 8 points.

On July 3, 2014, Kennedy continued his journeyman career by signing a one-year, two-way deal with the Washington Capitals, his original draft team. He was assigned to their AHL affiliate, the Hershey Bears for the duration of the 2014–15 season, featuring in the AHL All-Star game and posting 59 points in 75 games.

On June 3, 2015, Kennedy signed a one-year contract with Russian club, HC Neftekhimik Nizhnekamsk of the Kontinental Hockey League (KHL) for the 2015–16 season. Kennedy described the experience in Nizhnekamsk as a poor fit for him; he was unable to adapt to the coaching regimen and the city's strict military environment, which prevented him from bringing his family to Russia, and partway through the 2015–16 KHL season, the club bought out his contract. He finished the season playing for Helsinki-based Jokerit, which he considered a much more pleasant experience; he intended to return to North America for the 2016–17 season, most likely in the AHL, but eventually moved to Sweden, signing a one-year deal with Luleå HF of the Swedish Hockey League (SHL) on July 21, 2016. On December 15, 2016, he parted ways with the club, due to a combination of injuries and the birth of his son back in the United States. He was released from his contract in December 2016 and was claimed on waivers by the Charlotte Checkers of the AHL. The Checkers, after conversing with Kennedy, then dropped their claim and allowed Kennedy to sign with the Rochester Americans, allowing him to be closer to his family.

On October 5, 2017, after a successful try-out Kennedy was signed to a one-year AHL contract with the Binghamton Devils for the 2017–18 season.

== International play ==
Tim Kennedy was named to the Team USA roster for the 2010 World Championships in Germany. Team USA finished 13th out of 16 teams, with Kennedy scoring one goal and no assists in six games.

== Career statistics ==
=== Regular season and playoffs ===
			Regular season					Playoffs
Season	Team	League	GP	G	A	Pts	PIM	GP	G	A	Pts	PIM
2003–04	Sioux City Musketeers	USHL	56	9	10	19	42	7	2	2	4	6
2004–05	Sioux City Musketeers	USHL	54	30	31	61	112	13	6	11	17	18
2005–06	Michigan State University	CCHA	29	4	15	19	31	—	—	—	—	—
2006–07	Michigan State University	CCHA	42	18	25	43	49	—	—	—	—	—
2007–08	Michigan State University	CCHA	42	20	23	43	50	—	—	—	—	—
2008–09	Portland Pirates	AHL	73	18	49	67	51	5	0	1	1	2
2008–09	Buffalo Sabres	NHL	1	0	0	0	0	—	—	—	—	—
2009–10	Buffalo Sabres	NHL	78	10	16	26	50	6	1	2	3	4
2010–11	Hartford Wolf Pack/CT Whale	AHL	53	12	30	42	44	—	—	—	—	—
2010–11	Rochester Americans	AHL	14	0	7	7	8	—	—	—	—	—
2010–11	Florida Panthers	NHL	6	0	1	1	0	—	—	—	—	—
2011–12	San Antonio Rampage	AHL	18	3	6	9	18	—	—	—	—	—
2011–12	Florida Panthers	NHL	27	1	1	2	4	—	—	—	—	—
2011–12	Worcester Sharks	AHL	35	10	21	31	26	—	—	—	—	—
2012–13	Worcester Sharks	AHL	37	13	24	37	14	—	—	—	—	—
2012–13	San Jose Sharks	NHL	13	2	0	2	2	3	0	0	0	2
2013–14	Portland Pirates	AHL	30	4	11	15	14	—	—	—	—	—
2013–14	Phoenix Coyotes	NHL	37	2	6	8	4	—	—	—	—	—
2014–15	Hershey Bears	AHL	75	11	48	59	56	10	3	5	8	10
2015–16	Neftekhimik Nizhnekamsk	KHL	29	1	4	5	20	—	—	—	—	—
2015–16	Jokerit	KHL	18	3	6	9	8	6	0	0	0	4
2016–17	Luleå HF	SHL	18	2	2	4	12	—	—	—	—	—
2016–17	Rochester Americans	AHL	47	4	25	29	28	—	—	—	—	—
2017–18	Binghamton Devils	AHL	60	4	29	33	42	—	—	—	—	—
2018–19	Stoney Creek Generals	ACH	6	4	5	9	0	6	0	5	5	4
2019–20	Brantford Blast	ACH	8	1	6	7	13	4	2	1	3	2
AHL totals			442	79	250	329	301	15	3	6	9	12
NHL totals			162	15	24	39	60	9	1	2	3	6

=== International ===
Year	Team	Event	Result	GP	G	A	Pts	PIM
2010	United States	WC	13th	6	1	0	1	0
Senior totals				6	1	0	1	0

== Awards and honors ==
Award	Year
College
All-NCAA All-Tournament Team	2007
All-CCHA Second team	2008

== Post-playing career ==
Kennedy joined the staff of the Buffalo Sabres in 2021 as a developmental coach. On June 30, 2026, he was promoted to the post of director of player development.
