= Matt Hunwick =

American ice hockey player (born 1985)

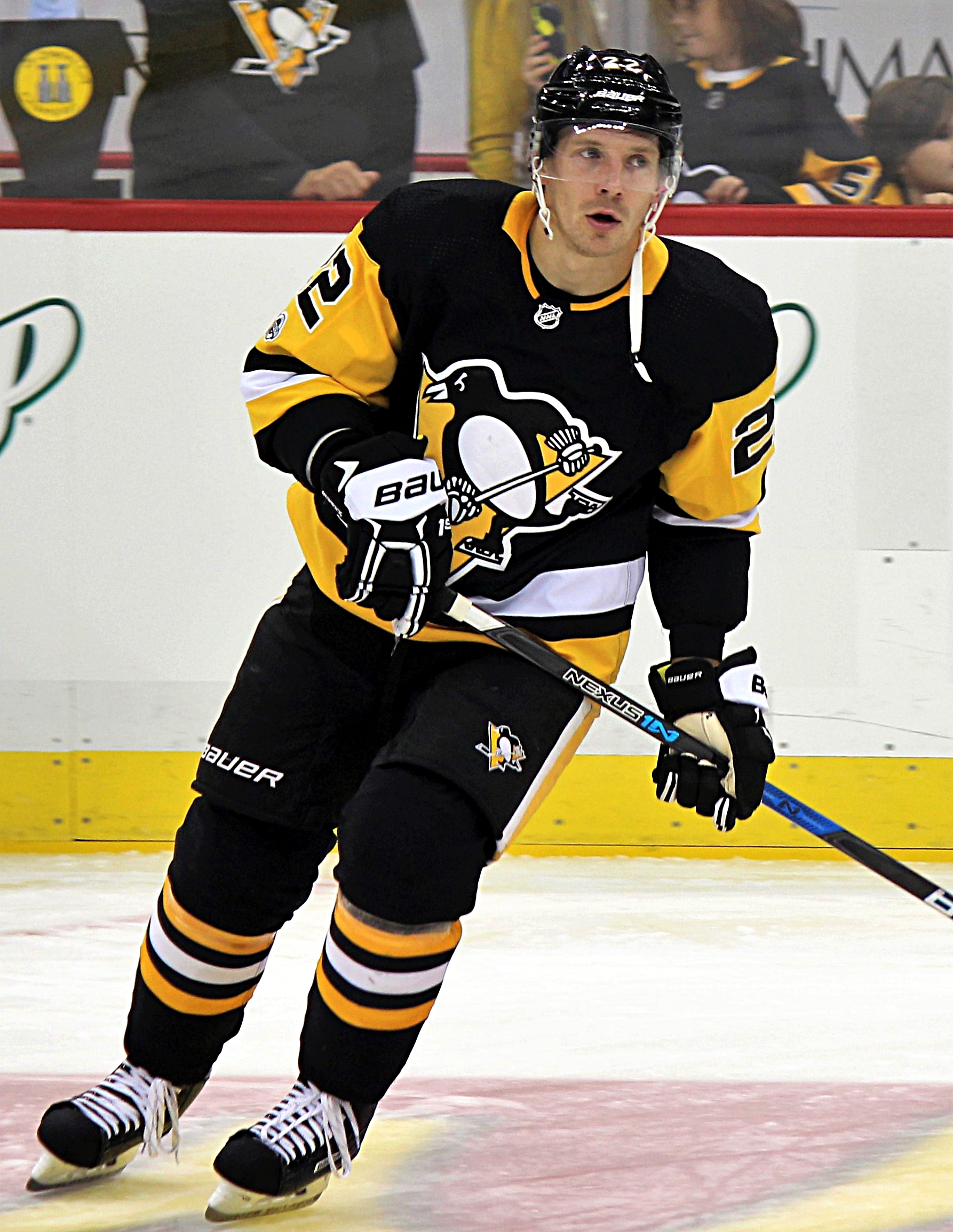
- Hunwick with the Pittsburgh Penguins in 2017
- Born: May 21, 1985 (age 41) Warren, Michigan, U.S.
- Height: 5 ft 11 in (180 cm)
- Weight: 200 lb (91 kg; 14 st 4 lb)
- Position: Defense
- Shot: Left
- Played for: Boston Bruins; Colorado Avalanche; New York Rangers; Toronto Maple Leafs; Pittsburgh Penguins; Buffalo Sabres
- National team: United States
- NHL draft: 224th overall, 2004; Boston Bruins
- Playing career: 2007–2019

Matthew John Hunwick (born May 21, 1985) is an American former professional ice hockey defenseman. He played in the National Hockey League (NHL) for the Boston Bruins, Colorado Avalanche, New York Rangers, Toronto Maple Leafs, Pittsburgh Penguins and the Buffalo Sabres. Hunwick was born in Warren, Michigan, but grew up in Sterling Heights, Michigan. Matt is the older brother of Shawn Hunwick.

== Playing career ==
As a youth, Hunwick played in the 1999 Quebec International Pee-Wee Hockey Tournament with the Detroit Honeybaked minor ice hockey team. He was later selected to the USA Hockey National Team Development Program in Ann Arbor, Michigan. After two seasons with the USDP, and showing potential as a two-way puck-moving defenseman he was recruited to play collegiate hockey with the University of Michigan in the CCHA.

In his freshman season of 2003–04, Hunwick finished third among team defenseman in scoring with 15 points in 41 games and was named to the CCHA All-Rookie Team as the Wolverines progressed to the North-East regional finals. Hunwick was then selected at the conclusion of the season by the Boston Bruins, in the seventh round, 224th overall, of the 2004 NHL entry draft.

As a sophomore in the 2004–05 season he scored his first career hat-trick, in an 8–3 victory over Bowling Green State on December 10, and was honored as the NCAA National Offensive Player of the Week. Hunwick increased his points total to 25 in 40 games with the Wolverines to be named to the CCHA Second All-Star Team. Hunwick received the same Second All-Star accolade while serving as an alternate captain in 2005–06, when he recorded a personal-best 11 goals and 30 points in 41 games to finish second among Wolverines D-men.

Returning as a senior to the Michigan Wolverines in the 2006–07 season, Hunwick took over as team captain. He was a part of a formidable blueline partnership alongside Jack Johnson, while recording a career-high 21 assists and posting 27 points in 41 games. Awarded the Wolverines’ Vic Heyliger Trophy as the team’s most outstanding defenseman for a third consecutive season, Hunwick was named to the CCHA First All-Star Team, West Second All-American Team and given the honor as the CCHA's best defensive defenseman.

=== Professional ===
==== Boston Bruins ====
Following completion of his collegiate career, Hunwick was then signed by the Boston Bruins to a two-year entry-level contract on June 26, 2007. Attending his first Bruins training camp, Hunwick was among the final cuts and assigned to American Hockey League affiliate, the Providence Bruins, to begin the 2007–08 season. After spending a month with Providence, Hunwick was recalled by Boston and played his first NHL regular season game in a 2–1 victory over the Buffalo Sabres on November 10, 2007. In his third recall to the Bruins, Hunwick recorded his first NHL point, an assist in a 2–1 defeat of the Toronto Maple Leafs on December 9. He finished his first professional season primarily with Providence, scoring 23 points in 55 games while totaling 13 games in the NHL from four separate recalls.

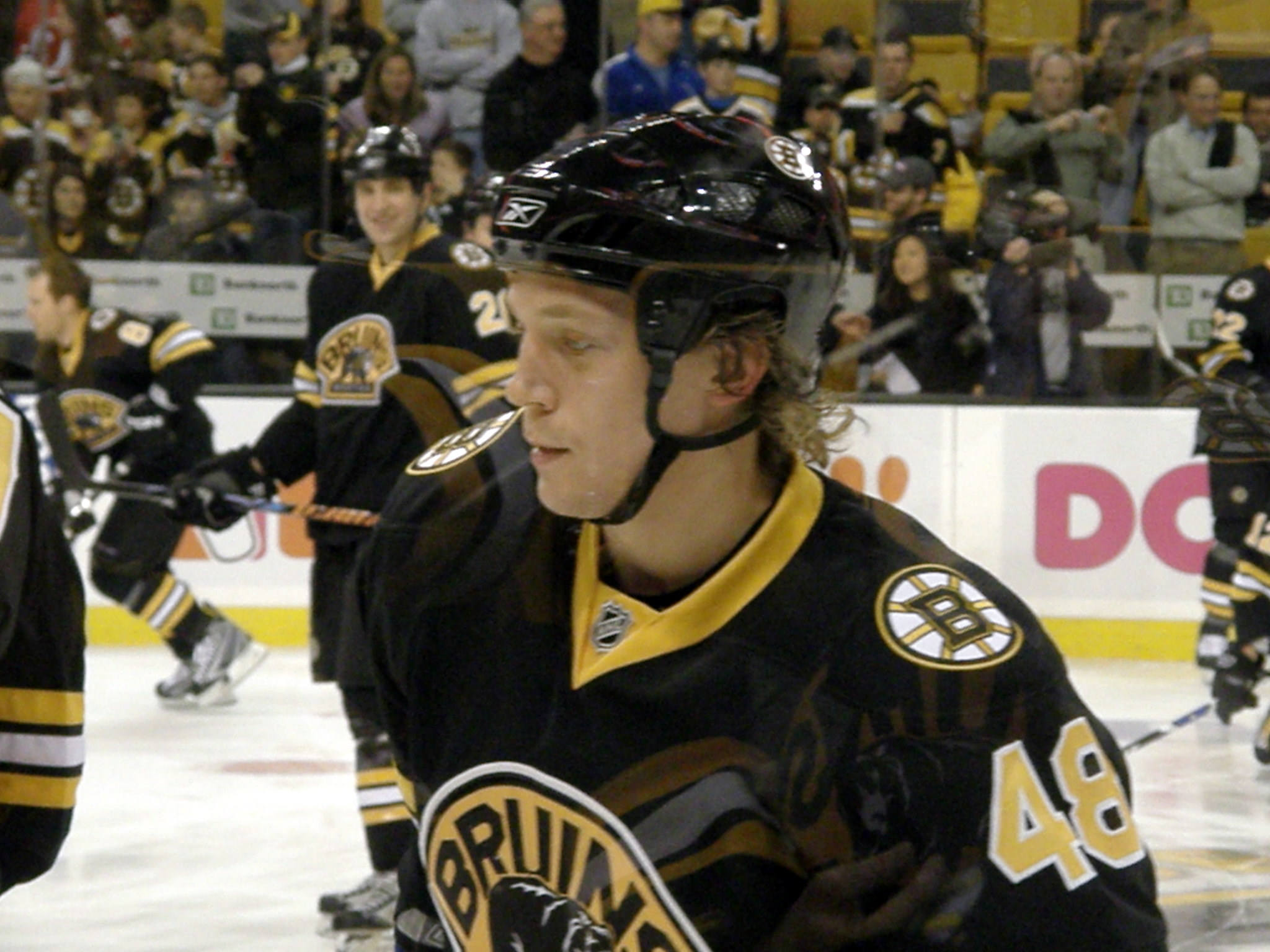
Hunwick as a member of the Bruins

In the following 2008–09 season, Hunwick was again initially reassigned to the AHL but after only two games was recalled and remained with the Bruins for the majority of the campaign. He scored his first career goal against Vesa Toskala in a 3–2 win over the Toronto Maple Leafs on November 17, 2008. His goal sparked a six-game scoring streak which tied Hall of Fame defenseman, Ray Bourque, as a club record for rookie defenseman. On January 10, 2009, in a game against the Carolina Hurricanes, Hunwick got into his first NHL fight, one-punching to knock down Justin Williams. Establishing a puck-moving role among the Bruins defense corps, Hunwick amassed a career-high 21 assists and 27 points in 53 regular season games. Hunwick made his post-season debut with the Bruins in game one of the Eastern Conference Quarterfinals against the Montreal Canadiens on April 16, 2009. However, on April 18, at a team meeting before game two against the Canadiens, Hunwick complained of abdominal pain. After consultation with the team doctor, it was determined that he needed medical treatment and Hunwick was taken to the hospital via ambulance. He underwent emergency surgery for a ruptured spleen, and was ruled out for the remainder of the playoffs.

Hunwick opted out of salary arbitration and re-signed to a two-year contract with the Bruins on July 20, 2009. Recovered from his splenectomy, Hunwick played his first full NHL season in 2009–10, playing in a career high 76 games. Despite matching his six goals from the previous year, Hunwick regressed offensively and struggled to recapture his form throughout the year to be occasionally relegated as a reserve defenseman. He recorded an assist as his first career post-season point in game one of a series quarterfinals victory against the Buffalo Sabres. Succumbing to the Philadelphia Flyers in the Eastern Conference Semi-finals, Hunwick finished to appear in all 13 playoff games for 6 assists.

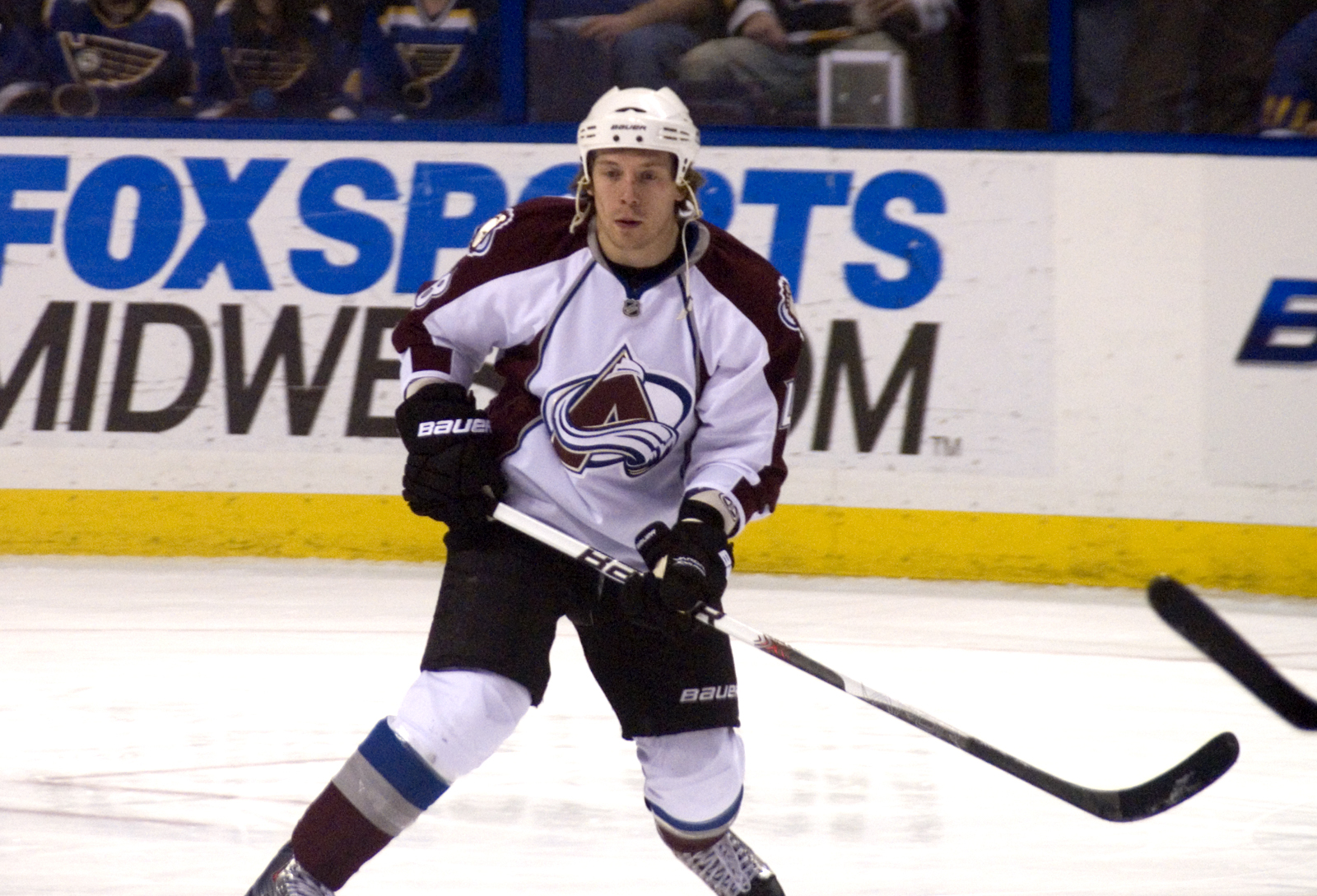
Hunwick as a member of the Avalanche

==== Colorado Avalanche ====
In the 2010–11 season, with the Bruins in need to reduce roster salary, Hunwick was traded to the Colorado Avalanche in exchange for Colby Cohen on November 29, 2010. On November 30, 2010, Hunwick made his debut for the Avalanche in a 3–2 overtime defeat. Hunwick's former team would go on to win the Stanley Cup that year.

On June 7, 2012 the Colorado Avalanche announced that they had re-signed Hunwick, to a two-year deal worth $3.2 million. In the final year of his contract and at the beginning of the 2013–14 season, Hunwick was relegated as a reserve defenseman and was placed on waivers by the Avalanche. Upon clearing, he was reassigned to the AHL for the first time since 2008 with affiliate, the Lake Erie Monsters on October 12, 2013.

==== New York Rangers ====
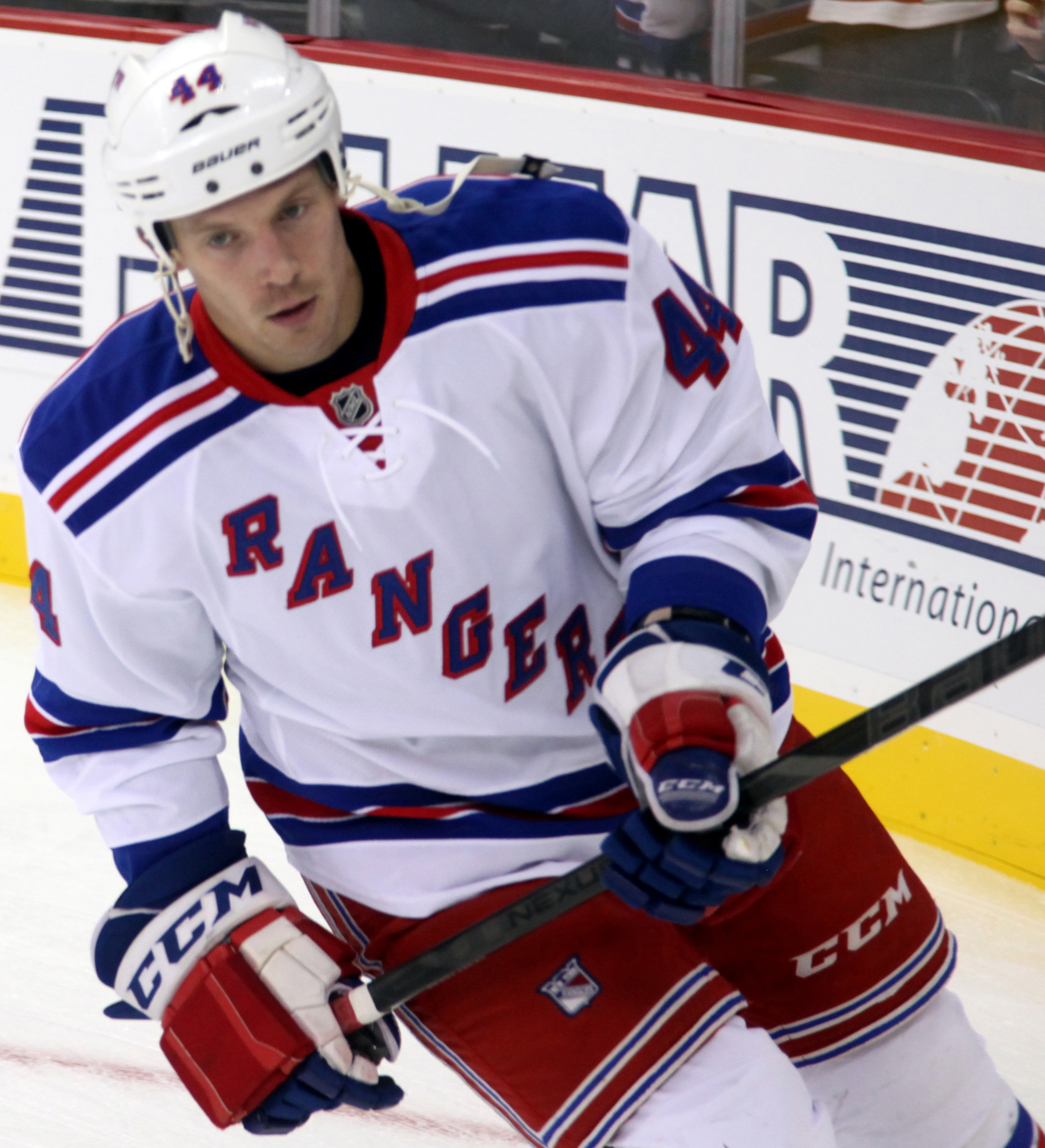
Hunwick as a Ranger in October 2014

On July 1, 2014, Hunwick ended his four-year tenure with the Avalanche by signing as a free agent to a one-year contract with the New York Rangers. In the 2014–15 season, Hunwick returned to the NHL as the Rangers depth defenseman. He appeared in 55 games for 11 points and played 6 games in the post-season for the first time since 2010.

==== Toronto Maple Leafs ====
Hunwick was not re-signed by the Rangers and on July 1, 2015, he signed a two-year deal worth $2.4 million with the Toronto Maple Leafs. Head coach Mike Babcock played a big role in the signing. Babcock, impressed with Hunwick's work ethic upon seeing him at a gym in 2013, made a case for acquiring him.

==== Pittsburgh Penguins ====
In concluding a successful two-year tenure with the Maple Leafs, Hunwick left as a free agent and signed a three-year $6.75 million contract with two time reigning champions, the Pittsburgh Penguins, on July 1, 2017.

==== Buffalo Sabres ====
On June 27, 2018, Hunwick, along with teammate Conor Sheary, was traded to the Buffalo Sabres for a fourth-round pick in the 2019 NHL entry draft. In doing so, the Penguins cleared over $5 million in salary cap space.

== Career statistics ==
=== Regular season and playoffs ===
			Regular season					Playoffs
Season	Team	League	GP	G	A	Pts	PIM	GP	G	A	Pts	PIM
2001–02	U.S. NTDP U17	USDP	14	3	4	7	6	—	—	—	—	—
2001–02	U.S. NTDP U18	NAHL	29	2	1	3	30	—	—	—	—	—
2002–03	U.S. NTDP U18	USDP	40	6	16	22	40	—	—	—	—	—
2002–03	U.S. NTDP U18	NAHL	8	2	2	4	23	—	—	—	—	—
2003–04	University of Michigan	CCHA	41	1	14	15	62	—	—	—	—	—
2004–05	University of Michigan	CCHA	40	6	19	25	60	—	—	—	—	—
2005–06	University of Michigan	CCHA	41	11	19	30	70	—	—	—	—	—
2006–07	University of Michigan	CCHA	41	6	21	27	64	—	—	—	—	—
2007–08	Providence Bruins	AHL	55	2	21	23	40	10	0	5	5	8
2007–08	Boston Bruins	NHL	13	0	1	1	4	—	—	—	—	—
2008–09	Providence Bruins	AHL	3	0	3	3	0	—	—	—	—	—
2008–09	Boston Bruins	NHL	53	6	21	27	31	1	0	0	0	0
2009–10	Boston Bruins	NHL	76	6	8	14	32	13	0	6	6	2
2010–11	Boston Bruins	NHL	22	1	2	3	9	—	—	—	—	—
2010–11	Colorado Avalanche	NHL	51	0	10	10	16	—	—	—	—	—
2011–12	Colorado Avalanche	NHL	33	3	3	6	8	—	—	—	—	—
2012–13	Colorado Avalanche	NHL	43	0	6	6	16	—	—	—	—	—
2013–14	Lake Erie Monsters	AHL	52	10	21	31	33	—	—	—	—	—
2013–14	Colorado Avalanche	NHL	1	0	0	0	0	—	—	—	—	—
2014–15	New York Rangers	NHL	55	2	9	11	16	6	0	0	0	0
2015–16	Toronto Maple Leafs	NHL	60	2	8	10	32	—	—	—	—	—
2016–17	Toronto Maple Leafs	NHL	72	1	18	19	18	6	0	1	1	2
2017–18	Pittsburgh Penguins	NHL	42	4	6	10	21	—	—	—	—	—
2018–19	Rochester Americans	AHL	2	0	1	1	0	—	—	—	—	—
2018–19	Buffalo Sabres	NHL	14	0	2	2	4	—	—	—	—	—
NHL totals			535	25	94	119	207	26	0	7	7	4

=== International ===
Medal record

Representing the United States

World Championships
Bronze medal – third place	2013 Sweden/Finland	

World Junior Championships
Gold medal – first place	2004 Helsinki	

Year	Team	Event	Result	GP	G	A	Pts	PIM
2003	United States	WJC18	4th	6	0	3	3	6
2004	United States	WJC	1st place, gold medalist(s)	6	0	0	0	0
2005	United States	WJC	4th	7	0	4	4	0
2013	United States	WC	3rd place, bronze medalist(s)	10	2	2	4	2
Junior totals				19	0	7	7	6
Senior totals				10	2	2	4	2

== Awards and honors ==
Award	Year
College
All-CCHA Rookie Team	2003–04
All-CCHA Second Team	2004–05, 2005–06
CCHA All-Tournament Team	2006
All-CCHA First Team	2006–07
All-CCHA Best Defensive Defenseman	2006–07
AHCA West Second-Team All-American	2006–07

Awards and achievements
Preceded by Andy Greene	CCHA Best Defensive Defenseman; 2006–07	Succeeded by Alec Martinez
