= Mike and Marian Ilitch Humanitarian Award =

- Sport: Ice hockey
- Awarded for: The league's top citizen based on his contributions off the ice as well as on

History
- First award: 2001
- Final award: 2013
- Most recent: Brett Beebe & Kaare Odegard

The Mike and Marian Ilitch Humanitarian Award was an annual award given out at the conclusion of the Central Collegiate Hockey Association regular season to the league's top citizen.

The Award was donated by and named after Mike and Marian Ilitch, a pair of wealthy Detroit-based businesspeople who well known both for their philanthropic efforts as well as their ownership of the Detroit Red Wings and Detroit Tigers. The Mike and Marian Ilitch Humanitarian Award was first bestowed in 2001 and every year thereafter until 2013 when the CCHA was dissolved as a consequence of the Big Ten forming its men's ice hockey conference.

== Award winners ==
Year	Winner	Position	School
2000–01	Jason Cupp	Center	Nebraska-Omaha
2001–02	Kevin O'Malley	Goaltender	Michigan
2002–03	Mike Betz	Goaltender	Ohio State
2003–04	Neil Komadoski	Defenceman	Notre Dame
2004–05	Bo Cheesman	Right wing	Lake Superior State
2005–06	Drew Miller	Left wing	Michigan State
2006–07	Tim Cook	Defenceman	Michigan
2007–08	Justin Abdelkader	Left wing	Michigan State
2008–09	Jeff Lerg	Goaltender	Michigan State
2008–09	Jerad Kaufmann	Goaltender	Nebraska-Omaha
2009–10	Dion Knelsen	Center	Alaska
2010–11	Trevor Nill	Center	Michigan State
2011–12	Cody Reichard	Goaltender	Miami
2012–13	Brett Beebe	Right wing	Western Michigan
2012–13	Kaare Odegard	Defenceman	Alaska

=== Winners by school ===
School	Winners
Michigan State	4
Alaska	2
Michigan	2
Nebraska-Omaha	2
Lake Superior State	1
Miami	1
Notre Dame	1
Ohio State	1
Western Michigan	1

=== Winners by position ===
Position	Winners
Center	3
Right wing	2
Left wing	2
Defenceman	3
Goaltender	5

== See also ==
- CCHA Awards
