= Bryan Lerg =

American ice hockey player (born 1986)

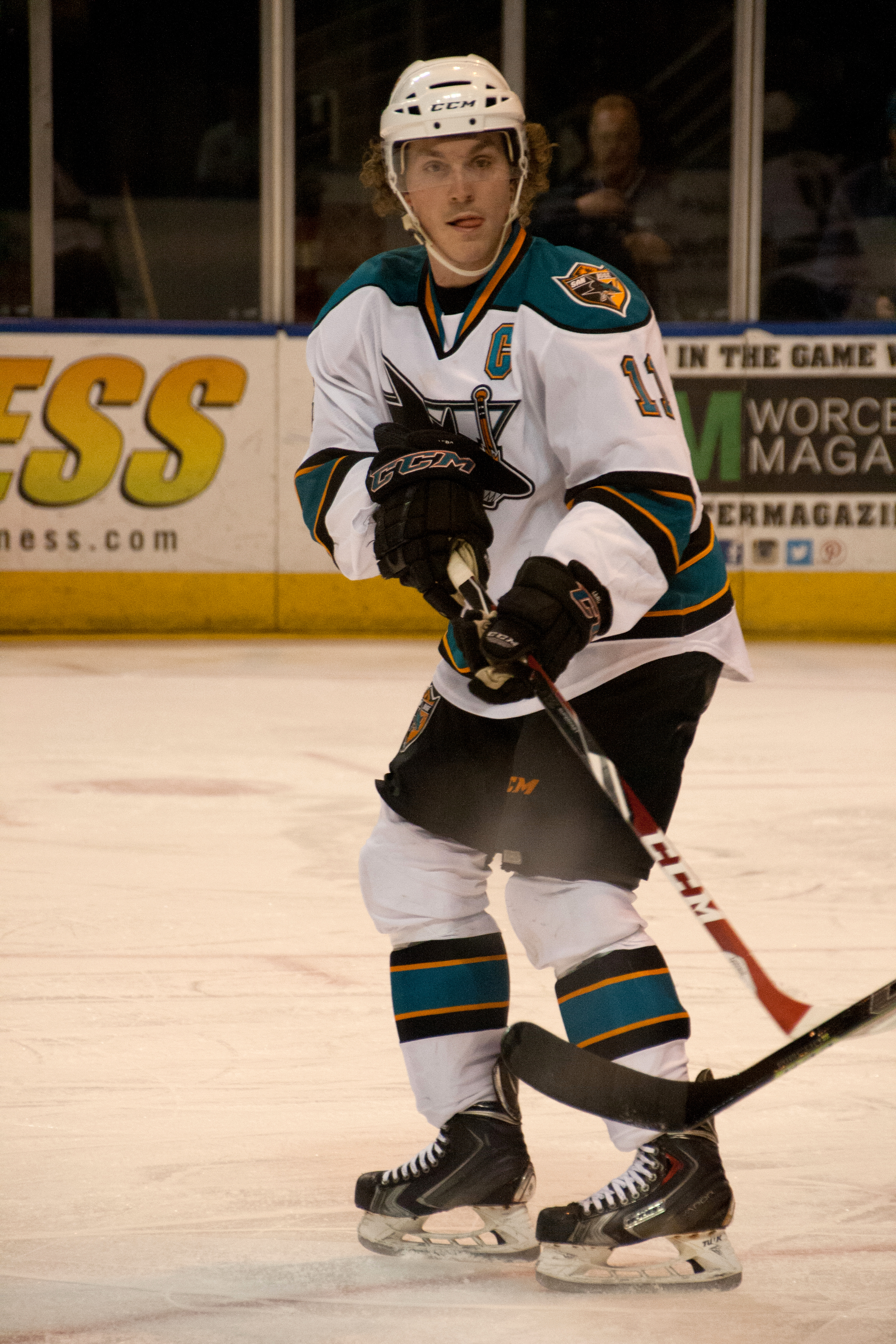
- Born: January 20, 1986 (age 40) Livonia, Michigan, U.S.
- Height: 5 ft 10 in (178 cm)
- Weight: 175 lb (79 kg; 12 st 7 lb)
- Position: Left wing
- Shot: Left
- Played for: Genève-Servette HC; San Jose Sharks; Rögle BK; HC Ambrì-Piotta
- NHL draft: Undrafted
- Playing career: 2008–2019

Bryan Lerg (born January 20, 1986) is an American former professional ice hockey forward who played in the National Hockey League (NHL) with the San Jose Sharks.

Lerg made his NHL debut after spending 7 years in the American Hockey League (AHL). Lerg played college hockey with Michigan State University where he helped the Spartans win a national championship in 2007.

== Playing career ==
As a youth, Lerg played in the 2000 Quebec International Pee-Wee Hockey Tournament with the Detroit Honeybaked minor ice hockey team.

Undrafted and much like his cousin Jeff, Lerg was of a small physique as a junior. A solid checker he played a strong, gritty game for his small stature. Opting to play collegiate hockey, in his freshman season with the Michigan State Spartans, Lerg accumulated 15 points (10 goals, 5 assists). By his Sophomore season, he had 38 points (15 goals, 23 assists) and in his junior season was given the honor of alternate captain and scored 36 points (23 goals, 13 assists), leading the Spartans to a national championship, in which he scored 8 game-winning goals to lead the NCAA. He was elected captain of the Spartans by team vote for the 2007-08 season and accumulated 39 points (20 goals, 19 assists) to be named the Spartans Offensive player of the year for a second time.

At the conclusion of his collegiate career, Lerg was signed to a two-year entry-level contract with the Edmonton Oilers on April 1, 2008. He immediately made his professional debut at the end of the 2007–08 season with affiliate, the Springfield Falcons of the American Hockey League.

After attending his first Oilers training camp, Lerg was reassigned to the Falcons to begin the 2008–09 season. Despite injury, Lerg scored 17 points in 42 games with the Falcons while also spending time in the ECHL with the Stockton Thunder. In the following season, Lerg suffered another injury and with a loss of form, struggled to cement his place within the Oilers farm team, scoring 7 points in 36 contests.

Unable to earn another contract with the Oilers, and with a lack of NHL interest, Lerg signed a try-out contract with Swiss team, Genève-Servette HC, of the Nationalliga A. Appearing in just a single game for Genève-Servette in the 2010–11 season, he returned to North America and the AHL, signing a one-year contract with the Wilkes-Barre/Scranton Penguins on December 8, 2010. Lerg made an immediate contribution with the Penguins and posted 32 points in 65 games to earn a one-year contract extension on July 13, 2011.

Prior to the 2011–12 season with Wilkes-Barre, Lerg was invited and attended the Pittsburgh Penguins training camp. After he was returned to their affiliate, Lerg produced a team leading and career high 27 goals to finish second on the team with 53 points.

On July 1, 2012, Lerg was signed as a free agent to a one-year, two-way contract with the Colorado Avalanche. With the 2012 NHL lockout in effect, Lerg was directly assigned to American League affiliate, the Lake Erie Monsters, to start the 2012–13 campaign. Shortly after the resumption of the season, he was announced as team captain on October 30, 2012. In the midst of a productive campaign with the Monsters in scoring 9 goals in 28 games, Lerg's season was cut short after he suffered a season-ending torn Anterior cruciate ligament injury which required surgery.

On April 22, 2013, Lerg agreed to a one-year contract extension with the Colorado Avalanche. He scored 27 points in 35 games before he was again struck by injury, sidelining himself for the majority of the season.

After two seasons within the Avalanche organization, Lerg left as a free agent to sign a one-year, two way contract with the San Jose Sharks on July 10, 2014. After participating in his first Sharks training camp, Lerg was assigned to AHL affiliate, the Worcester Sharks to begin the 2014–15 season. For the third successive season, Lerg was selected as an AHL team captain. While leading Worcester in scoring and after 8 professional seasons, Lerg's perseverance was rewarded on April 6, 2015, in receiving his first NHL call up to the San Jose Sharks as they approached the final games of the regular season. On April 9, 2015, Lerg made his NHL debut against his original NHL club, the Edmonton Oilers. Lerg impressed in scoring his first NHL goal, the game-winning goal in a 3-1 victory.

On May 4, 2016, he left the Sharks organization as an impending free agent to sign with Rögle BK of the Swedish Hockey League (SHL).

== Personal information ==
He is the cousin of former college teammate Jeff Lerg.

== Career statistics ==
=== Regular season and playoffs ===
			Regular season					Playoffs
Season	Team	League	GP	G	A	Pts	PIM	GP	G	A	Pts	PIM
2002–03	U.S. NTDP U18	NAHL	46	10	12	22	32	—	—	—	—	—
2003–04	U.S. NTDP U18	NAHL	11	5	7	12	10	—	—	—	—	—
2004–05	Michigan State University	CCHA	41	10	5	15	14	—	—	—	—	—
2005–06	Michigan State University	CCHA	45	15	23	38	26	—	—	—	—	—
2006–07	Michigan State University	CCHA	41	23	13	36	21	—	—	—	—	—
2007–08	Michigan State University	CCHA	42	20	19	39	18	—	—	—	—	—
2007–08	Springfield Falcons	AHL	4	0	2	2	2	—	—	—	—	—
2008–09	Springfield Falcons	AHL	42	9	8	17	24	—	—	—	—	—
2008–09	Stockton Thunder	ECHL	7	2	8	10	4	—	—	—	—	—
2009–10	Springfield Falcons	AHL	36	4	3	7	11	—	—	—	—	—
2010–11	Genève–Servette HC	NLA	1	0	0	0	0	—	—	—	—	—
2010–11	Wilkes–Barre/Scranton Penguins	AHL	64	15	16	31	21	9	1	2	3	4
2011–12	Wilkes–Barre/Scranton Penguins	AHL	70	27	26	53	32	12	0	2	2	4
2012–13	Lake Erie Monsters	AHL	28	9	7	16	6	—	—	—	—	—
2013–14	Lake Erie Monsters	AHL	35	12	15	27	4	—	—	—	—	—
2014–15	Worcester Sharks	AHL	68	13	28	41	10	4	0	1	1	0
2014–15	San Jose Sharks	NHL	2	1	0	1	0	—	—	—	—	—
2015–16	San Jose Barracuda	AHL	64	21	30	51	37	4	1	0	1	0
2015–16	San Jose Sharks	NHL	6	0	0	0	0	—	—	—	—	—
2016–17	Rögle BK	SHL	52	20	13	33	44	—	—	—	—	—
2017–18	Rögle BK	SHL	52	19	11	30	24	—	—	—	—	—
2018–19	HC Ambrì–Piotta	NL	17	5	0	5	4	—	—	—	—	—
AHL totals			412	110	136	246	147	29	2	5	7	8
NHL totals			8	1	0	1	0	—	—	—	—	—

Medal record

Representing United States

Men's ice hockey

IIHF U18 Championships
Silver medal – second place	2004 Minsk	

=== International ===
Year	Team	Event	Result	GP	G	A	Pts	PIM
2004	United States	WJC18	2nd place, silver medalist(s)	6	2	6	8	2
Junior totals				6	2	6	8	2
