= CCHA Best Defensive Forward =

- Sport: Ice hockey
- Awarded for: Best Defensive Forward in the CCHA

History
- First award: 1990
- Most recent: Lucas Wahlin

The CCHA Best Defensive Forward is an annual award given out at the conclusion of the Central Collegiate Hockey Association (CCHA) regular season to the best defensive forward in the conference as voted by the coaches of each CCHA team.

The Best Defensive Forward was first awarded in 1990 and every year thereafter until 2013 when the original CCHA was dissolved as a consequence of the Big Ten Conference forming its men's ice hockey conference.

The CCHA was revived in 2020, with play resuming in the 2021–22 season, by seven schools that left the Western Collegiate Hockey Association, with an eighth school joining before play started. The revived league folded the Best Defensive Forward award into a new CCHA Forward of the Year award. The award was revived in 2024.

Jackson Jutting is the only player to win the award multiple times.

== Award winners ==
Year	Winner	Position	School
1989–90	Pete Stauber	Left wing	Lake Superior State
1990–91	Jeff Napierala	Right wing	Lake Superior State
1991–92	Pat Ferschweiler	Right wing	Western Michigan
1992–93	Chris Bergeron	Center	Miami
1993–94	Mike Stone	Center	Michigan
1994–95	Wayne Strachan	Right wing	Lake Superior State
1995–96	Bates Battaglia	Left wing	Lake Superior State
1996–97	John Madden	Center	Michigan
1997–98	Terry Marchant	Center	Lake Superior State
1998–99	Mike York	Center	Michigan State
1999–00	Shawn Horcoff	Center	Michigan State
2000–01	John Nail	Right wing	Michigan State
2001–02	Bobby Andrews	Center	Alaska-Fairbanks
2002–03	Jed Ortmeyer	Right wing	Michigan

Year	Winner	Position	School
2003–04	Dwight Helminen	Center	Michigan
2004–05	Eric Nystrom	Left wing	Michigan
2005–06	Drew Miller	Left wing	Michigan State
2006–07	Nathan Davis	Center	Miami
2007–08	Justin Abdelkader	Center	Michigan State
2008–09	Tim Miller	Left wing	Michigan
2009–10	Tommy Wingels	Center	Miami
2010–11	Carl Hagelin	Left wing	Michigan
2011–12	Luke Glendening	Right wing	Michigan
2012–13	Dane Walters	Right wing	Western Michigan
2023–24	Jackson Jutting	Forward	Bemidji State
2023–24	Connor Milburn	Forward	Lake Superior State
2024–25	Jackson Jutting	Forward	Bemidji State
2025–26	Lucas Wahlin	Forward	St. Thomas

=== Winners by school ===
School	Winners
Michigan	8
Lake Superior State	6
Michigan State	5
Miami	3
Bemidji State	2
Western Michigan	2
Alaska	1
St. Thomas	1

=== Winners by position ===
Position	Winners
Center	11
Right wing	7
Left wing	6
Forward	4

== See also ==
- CCHA Awards
