= 2007 NCAA Division I men's ice hockey tournament =

- 2007 Frozen Four logo
- Teams: 16
- Finals site: Scottrade Center, St. Louis, Missouri
- Champions: Michigan State Spartans (3rd title)
- Runner-up: Boston College Eagles (8th title game)
- Semifinalists: North Dakota Fighting Sioux (17th Frozen Four); Maine Black Bears (11th Frozen Four)
- Winning coach: Rick Comley (2nd title)
- MOP: Justin Abdelkader (Michigan State)
- Attendance: 115,684

The 2007 NCAA Division I men's ice hockey tournament involved 16 schools playing in single-elimination play to determine the national champion of men's NCAA Division I college ice hockey as the culmination of the 2006–07 season. The tournament began on March 23, 2007, and ended with the championship game on April 7.

This year's tournament was the first since 2004 to feature multiple programs, Air Force, Alabama-Huntsville, and Massachusetts, making their first appearance in the NCAA playoffs.

== Tournament procedure ==
2007 Regionals (blue) and Frozen Four (red)

The NCAA Men's Division I Ice Hockey Championship is a single-elimination tournament featuring 16 teams representing all six Division I conferences in the nation. The Championship Committee seeds the entire field from 1 to 16 within four regionals of 4 teams. The winners of the six Division I conference championships receive automatic bids to participate in the NCAA Championship.

The four regionals are officially named after their geographic areas. The following were the sites for the 2007 regionals:

March 23 and 24
East Regional, Blue Cross Arena – Rochester, New York (Host: ECAC Hockey League)
Midwest Regional, Van Andel Arena – Grand Rapids, Michigan (Host: Western Michigan University)

March 24 and 25
West Regional, Pepsi Center – Denver, Colorado (Host: University of Denver)
Northeast Regional, Verizon Wireless Arena – Manchester, New Hampshire (Host: University of New Hampshire)

Each regional winner advanced to the Frozen Four:

April 5 and 7
Scottrade Center – St. Louis, Missouri (Hosts: College Hockey America and the St. Louis Sports Commission)

== Qualifying teams ==
Hockey East had five teams receive a berth in the tournament, the Central Collegiate Hockey Association (CCHA) had four teams receive a berth, the Western Collegiate Hockey Association (WCHA) had three teams receive a berth, the ECACHL had two teams receive a berth, and Atlantic Hockey and College Hockey America (CHA) each had one team receive a berth.

West Regional – Denver							Midwest Regional – Grand Rapids						
Seed	School	Conference	Record	Berth type	Appearance	Last bid	Seed	School	Conference	Record	Berth type	Appearance	Last bid
1	Minnesota (1)	WCHA	30–9–3	Tournament champion	31st	2006	1	Notre Dame (2)	CCHA	31–6–3	Tournament champion	2nd	2004
2	Michigan	CCHA	26–13–1	At-large bid	30th	2006	2	Boston University	Hockey East	20–9–9	At-large bid	30th	2006
3	North Dakota	WCHA	22–13–5	At-large bid	22nd	2006	3	Michigan State	CCHA	22–13–3	At-large bid	25th	2006
4	Air Force	Atlantic Hockey	19–15–5	Tournament champion	1st	Never	4	Alabama–Huntsville	CHA	13–19–3	Tournament champion	1st	Never
East Regional – Rochester							Northeast Regional – Manchester						
Seed	School	Conference	Record	Berth type	Appearance	Last bid	Seed	School	Conference	Record	Berth type	Appearance	Last bid
1	Clarkson (3)	ECACHL	25–8–5	Tournament champion	19th	1999	1	New Hampshire (4)	Hockey East	26–10–2	At-large bid	17th	2006
2	St. Cloud State	WCHA	22–10–7	At-large bid	6th	2003	2	Boston College	Hockey East	26–11–1	Tournament champion	27th	2006
3	Maine	Hockey East	21–14–2	At-large bid	17th	2006	3	St. Lawrence	ECACHL	23–13–2	At-large bid	16th	2001
4	Massachusetts	Hockey East	20–12–5	At-large bid	1st	Never	4	Miami	CCHA	23–13–4	At-large bid	5th	2006

Number in parentheses denotes overall seed in the tournament.

== Bracket ==
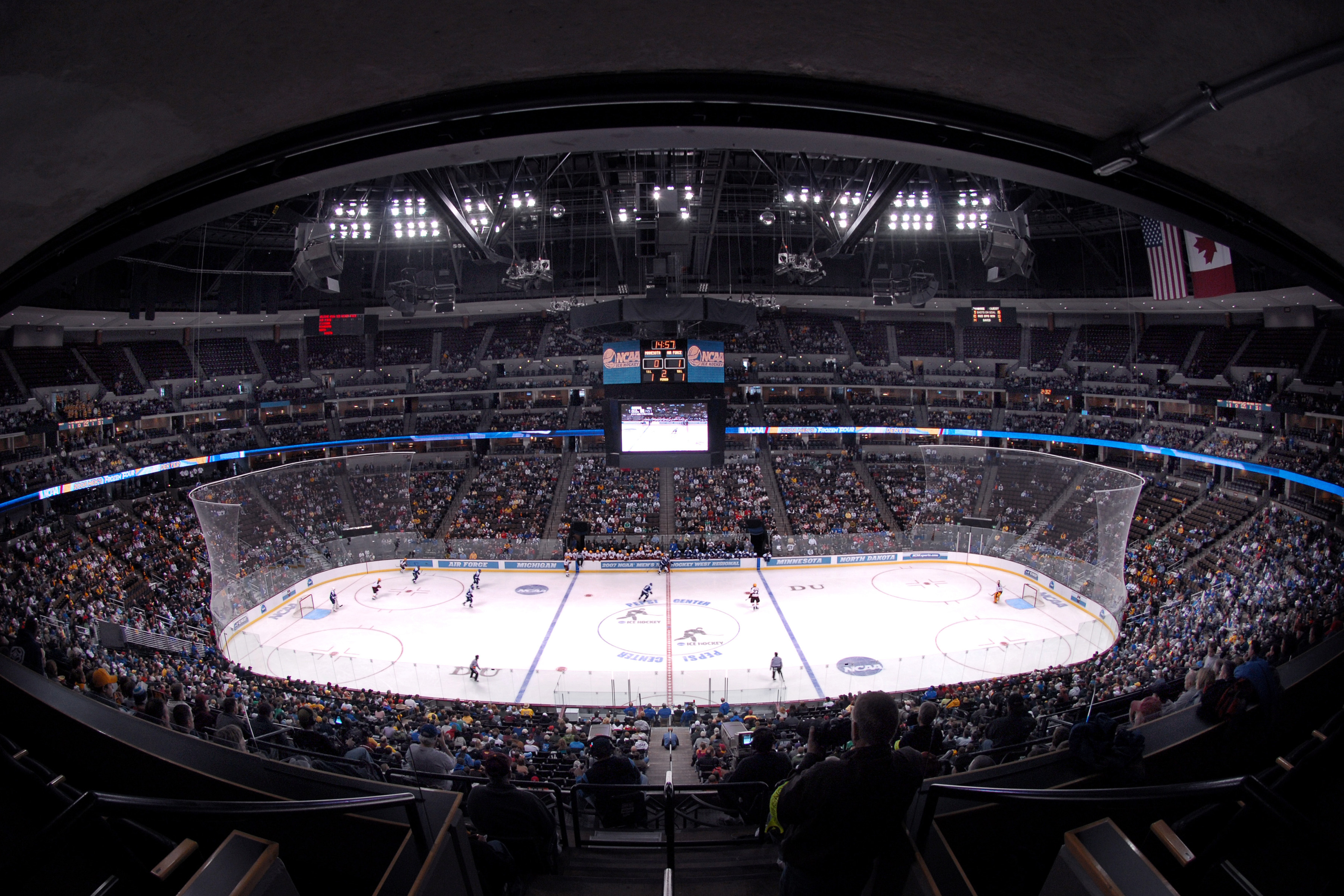
The Pepsi Center in Denver, Colorado hosted the West Regional, including this game between Minnesota and Air Force.

Regional Semifinals; March 23–24
1	Minnesota (1)	4
4	Air Force	3
West – Denver – Sat/Sun
2	Michigan	5
3	North Dakota	8
1	New Hampshire (4)	1
4	Miami	2
Northeast – Manchester – Sat/Sun
2	Boston College	4
3	St. Lawrence	1
1	Notre Dame (2)	3**
4	Alabama-Huntsville	2
Midwest – Grand Rapids – Fri/Sat
2	Boston University	1
3	Michigan State	5
1	Clarkson (3)	0
4	Massachusetts	1*
East – Rochester – Fri/Sat
2	St. Cloud State	1
3	Maine	4

Regional Finals; March 24–25
1	Minnesota (1)	2
3	North Dakota	3*
4	Miami	0
2	Boston College	4
1	Notre Dame (2)	1
3	Michigan State	2
4	Massachusetts	1
3	Maine	3

National Semifinals; April 5
W3	North Dakota	4
NE2	Boston College	6
MW3	Michigan State	4
E3	Maine	2

National Championship; April 7
NE2	Boston College	1
MW3	Michigan State	3

== Results ==
=== West Regional – Denver, Colorado ===
==== Regional Semifinals ====
March 24, 2007; 1:30 pm	(1) Minnesota	4–3 (0–1, 1–1, 3–1)	(4) Air Force	Pepsi Center; Attendance: 11,161

Game reference

Kellen Briggs
Goalies
Andrew Volkening
Referee:
Scott Hansen
Linesmen:
Andy O'Brien
Dave Kronenberg

	0 – 1	09:55 – Jeff Hajner (Fairchild)
(Vannelli) Jay Barriball – 29:00	1 – 1
	1 – 2	39:23 – PP – Andrew Ramsey (Phillipich, Mayra)
	1 – 3	45:22 – Brett Nylander (Fairchild, Schiavone)
(Okposo, Kaufmann) Ryan Stoa – PP – 51:50	2 – 3
(Johnson, Peltier) Jim O'Brien – 53:00	3 – 3
(Goligoski, Vannelli) Mike Carman – GW – 55:26	4 – 3

8 min
Penalties
8 min
37
Shots
31

March 24, 2007; 5:30 pm	(2) Michigan	5–8 (3–4, 2–3, 0–1)	(3) North Dakota	Pepsi Center; Attendance: 11,171

Game reference

Billy Sauer
Goalies
Jean-Philippe Lamoureux
Referee:
Dave Hansen
Linesmen:
Bob Bernard
Tim Low

(Hensick, Johnson) Kevin Porter – 00:26	1 – 0
(Cogliano) Chris Summers – 00:58	2 – 0
	2 – 1	03:05 – PP – Chris Porter (VandeVelde, Genoway)
(Rohlfs, Johnson) T. J. Hensick – 04:58	3 – 1
	3 – 2	14:36 – PP – Chris Porter (Miller, Genoway)
	3 – 3	16:28 – T. J. Oshie (Duncan, Lee)
	3 – 4	18:47 – PP – Jonathan Toews (Bina, Duncan)
(Porter, Hunwick) T. J. Hensick – PP – 20:14	4 – 4
(unassisted) Andrew Cogliano – 20:58	5 – 4
	5 – 5	23:16 – PP – Robbie Bina (Oshie)
	5 – 6	24:53 – GW – Rylan Kaip (Watkins, Porter)
	5 – 7	28:03 – PP – T. J. Oshie (Bina, Duncan)
	5 – 8	57:49 – SH EN – T. J. Oshie (unassisted)

28 min
Penalties
10 min
34
Shots
27

==== Regional Final ====
March 25, 2007; 4:00 pm	(1) Minnesota	2–3 (OT) (1–1, 0–0, 1–1, 0–1)	(3) North Dakota	Pepsi Center; Attendance: 11,217

Game reference

Jeff Frazee
Goalies
Jean-Philippe Lamoureux
Referee:
Tim Benedetto
Linesmen:
Bob Bernard
Tim Low

(Vannelli, Lucia Mike Carman – 02:22	1 – 0
	1 – 1	06:49 – Ryan Duncan (Lee)
	1 – 2	42:08 – PP – Robbie Bina (Toews, Oshie)
(Vannelli, Goligoski) Jay Barriball – PP – 53:11	2 – 2
	2 – 3	69:43 – GW – Chris Porter (Watkins, Jones)

12 min
Penalties
25 min
29
Shots
36

=== Midwest Regional – Grand Rapids, Michigan ===
==== Regional Semifinals ====
March 23, 2007; 5:00 pm	(1) Notre Dame	3–2 (2OT) (2–0, 0–2, 0–0, 0–0, 1–0)	(4) Alabama-Huntsville	Van Andel Arena

Game reference

David Brown
Goalies
Blake MacNicol (out 04:26)
Marc Narduzzi (in 04:26)
Referee:
Jeff Bunyon
Linesmen:
Chris Aughe
Kevin Shea

(unassisted) Josh Sciba – 03:18	1 – 0
(Condra) Ryan Thang – 04:26	2 – 0
	2 – 1	30:20 – Dominik Rozman (Murray)
	2 – 2	36:06 – Cale Tanaka (Train)
(Lawson, Blatchford) Ryan Thang – GW PP – 95:18	3 – 2

4 min
Penalties
12 min
53
Shots
30

March 23, 2007; 10:05 pm	(2) Boston University	1–5 (1–1, 0–3, 0–1)	(3) Michigan State	Van Andel Arena; Attendance: 5,201

Game reference

John Curry
Goalies
Jeff Lerg
Referee:
Jon Campion
Linesmen:
C.J. Beaurline
Dan Carey

(Gilroy, Popko) Ryan Weston – 06:05	1 – 0
	1 – 1	12:51 – PP – Tim Kennedy (unassisted)
	1 – 2	21:11 – GW – Tim Crowder (Kennedy, Howells)
	1 – 3	25:22 – Jay Sprague (Graham, Sucharski)
	1 – 4	37:09 – Daniel Vukovic (B. Lerg, Mueller)
	1 – 5	48:04 – Tim Crowder (Dunne, Howells)

42 min
Penalties
16 min
28
Shots
26

==== Regional Final ====
March 24, 2007; 8:30 pm	(1) Notre Dame	1–2 (0–0, 0–1, 1–1)	(3) Michigan State	Van Andel Arena; Attendance: 4,839

Game reference

David Brown
Goalies
Jeff Lerg
Referee:
Peter Feola
Linesmen:
Robert St. Lawrence
Marty Demers

	0 – 1	26:04 – PP – Chris Mueller (Snavely, Graham)
	0 – 2	45:59 – GW PP – Tim Kennedy (Crowder, Abdelkader)
(Blatchford, Paige) Evan Rankin – 54:52	1 – 2

16 min
Penalties
20 min
20
Shots
25

=== East Regional – Rochester, New York ===
==== Regional Semifinals ====
March 23, 2007; 2:30 pm	(1) Clarkson	0–1 (OT) (0–0, 0–0, 0–0, 0–1)	(4) Massachusetts	Blue Cross Arena; Attendance: 3,887

Game reference
David Leggio	Goalies	Jonathan Quick	Referee: Steve Piotrowski; Linesmen: Brian Hill; Tony Molina
0 – 1 / 67:40 – GW – Kevin Jarman (Virtue, Ortiz)			Referee: Steve Piotrowski; Linesmen: Brian Hill; Tony Molina
12 min	Penalties	12 min	Referee: Steve Piotrowski; Linesmen: Brian Hill; Tony Molina
33	Shots	38	Referee: Steve Piotrowski; Linesmen: Brian Hill; Tony Molina

March 23, 2007; 6:30 pm	(2) St. Cloud State	1–4 (1–3, 0–1, 0–0)	(3) Maine	Blue Cross Arena; Attendance: 3,887

Game reference

Bobby Goepfert
Goalies
Ben Bishop
Referee:
Steve McInchunk
Linesmen:
Paul Tunison
Kevin Langseth

(Stephenson) Justin Fletcher – 03:39	1 – 0
	1 – 1	07:21 – PP – Brent Shepheard (Léveillé, Purcell)
	1 – 2	08:11 – GW – Billy Ryan (Hamilton, Purcell)
	1 – 3	14:08 – PP – Michel Léveillé (Lundin, Purcell)
	1 – 4	37:08 – Rob Bellamy (Shepheard, de Kastrozza)

14 min
Penalties
22 min
34
Shots
21

==== Regional Final ====
March 24, 2007; 6:00 pm	(3) Maine	3–1 (0–0, 2–1, 1–0)	(4) Massachusetts	Blue Cross Arena; Attendance: 3,522

Game reference

Ben Bishop
Goalies
Jonathan Quick
Referee:
Matt Shegos
Linesmen:
John Philo
Bruce Vida

Bret Tyler (Soares, Léveillé) – 25:23	1 – 0
Mike Hamilton (Soares, Ryan) – GW PP – 29:45	2 – 0
	2 – 1	38:14 – PP – Matt Anderson (Jarman, Fenton)
Matt Duffy (Tyler, Ryan) – PP – 46:28	3 – 1

16 min
Penalties
16 min
29
Shots
36

=== Northeast Regional – Manchester, New Hampshire ===
==== Regional Semifinals ====
March 24, 2007; 1:00 pm	(1) New Hampshire	1–2 (0–1, 0–0, 1–1)	(4) Miami	Verizon Wireless Arena; Attendance: 9,015

Game reference

Kevin Regan
Goalies
Jeff Zatkoff
Referee:
Todd Anderson
Linesmen:
Butch Mohssequx
Bob Kiltie

	0 – 1	01:47 – Nathan Davis (Kaufman, Jones)
	0 – 2	40:39 – GW – Ryan Jones (unassisted)
(Switzer, Flaishans) Mike Radja – SH – 55:15	1 – 2

12 min
Penalties
14 min
44
Shots
25

March 24, 2007; 4:30 pm	(2) Boston College	4–1 (1–0, 1–1, 2–0)	(3) St. Lawrence	Verizon Wireless Arena; Attendance: 9,015

Game reference

Cory Schneider
Goalies
Alex Petizian
Referee:
Derek Shepard
Linesmen:
Tim Swaaider
Scott Staudte

(Smith, Bradford) Brian Boyle – 01:24	1 – 0
(Gerbe, Bradford) Ben Smith – PP GW – 20:40	2 – 0
	2 – 1	22:12 – Brock McBride (Taylor)
(O'Hanley) Andrew Orpik – 43:34	3 – 1
(Gerbe, Greene) Brock Bradford – EN – 59:37	4 – 1

20 min
Penalties
16 min
35
Shots
25

==== Regional Final ====
March 25, 2007; 3:30 pm	(2) Boston College	4–0 (0–0, 2–0, 2–0)	(4) Miami	Verizon Wireless Arena; Attendance: 7,007

Game reference

Cory Schneider
Goalies
Jeff Zatkoff
Referee:
Derek Shepard
Linesmen:
Butch Mousseaux
Bob Keltie

Joe Rooney (Ferriero, Brennan) – GW – 23:00	1 – 0
Joe Rooney (Bertram, Smith) – PP – 25:44	2 – 0
Kyle Kucharski (Lombardi) – 47:27	3 – 0
Benn Ferriero (Bertram, Motherwell) – 51:21	4 – 0

20 min
Penalties
29 min
33
Shots
37

=== Frozen Four – St. Louis, Missouri ===
==== National Semifinals ====
April 5, 2007; 3:00 pm	(MW3) Michigan State	4–2 (1–2, 1–0, 2–0)	(E3) Maine	Scottrade Center; Attendance: 18,857

Game reference

Jeff Lerg
Goalies
Ben Bishop
Referee:
Derek Shepherd
Linesmen:
Butch Mousseaux
Bob Keltie

	0 – 1	00:23 – Keith Johnson (Soares, Léveillé)
	0 – 2	03:24 – Josh Soares (Ramsey, Johnson)
Chris Mueller – 07:25	1 – 2
Chris Snavely (Abdelkader, Kennedy) – 36:32	2 – 2
Nick Sucharski (Schepke, Sprague) – GW – 45:11	3 – 2
Jim McKenzie (Mueller) – 49:46	4 – 2

6 min
Penalties
8 min
33
Shots
31

April 5, 2007; 7:00 pm	(NE2) Boston College	6–4 (1–1, 1–1, 4–2)	(W3) North Dakota	Scottrade Center; Attendance: 18,857

Game reference

Cory Schneider
Goalies
Jean-Philippe Lamoureux
Referee:
Matt Shegos
Linesmen:
Kevin Langseth
John Philo

	0 – 1	10:28 – Chris Porter (Lee, VandeVelde)
(Smith, O'Hanley) Dan Bertram – PP – 15:41	1 – 1
	1 – 2	23:51 – PP – Jonathan Toews (Oshie, Chorney)
(Sneep, Gerbe) Dan Bertram – PP – 35:21	2 – 2
(Gerbe, Motherwell) Ben Smith – 53:00	3 – 2
	3 – 3	55:22 – SH – T. J. Oshie
(Bradford, Motherwell) Nathan Gerbe – PP – 55:54	4 – 3
(Boyle, Schneider) Joe Rooney – SH EN GW – 59:10	5 – 3
	5 – 4	59:43 – PP EA – Chris Porter (Oshie, Chorney)
(unassisted) Nathan Gerbe – EN – 59:54	6 – 4

14 min
Penalties
14 min
45
Shots
29

==== National Championship ====
April 7, 2007; 6:00 pm	(NE2) Boston College	1–3 (0–0, 1–0, 0–3)	(MW3) Michigan State	Scottrade Center; Attendance: 19,432

Game reference
Referee: Derek Shepherd; Linesmen: Bob Keltie; Butch Mousseaux

Scoring summary
Period	Team	Goal	Assist(s)	Time	Score
1st	None				
2nd	BC	Brian Boyle (19) – PP	Bradford	26:50	1–0 BC
3rd	MSU	Tim Kennedy (18) – PP	Abdelkader	49:53	1–1
3rd	MSU	Justin Abdelkader (15) – GW	Kennedy and Howells	59:41	2–1 MSU
3rd	MSU	Chris Mueller (16) – EN	McKenzie and Vukovic	59:58	3–1 MSU
Penalty summary
Period	Team	Player	Penalty	Time	PIM
1st	MSU	Chris Snavely	Obstruction Interference	9:46	2:00
1st	BC	Dan Bertram	Holding the Stick	17:34	2:00
1st	MSU	Ethan Graham	Unsportsmanlike Conduct	17:51	2:00
1st	BC	Nathan Gerbe	Unsportsmanlike Conduct	17:51	2:00
2nd	MSU	Justin Abdelkader	Hooking	23:34	2:00
2nd	MSU	Tim Crowder	Hooking	25:00	2:00
2nd	BC	Tim Filangieri	Interference	28:38	2:00
2nd	BC	Brian Boyle	Tripping	30:31	2:00
2nd	BC	Carl Sneep	Slashing	32:58	2:00
3rd	MSU	Justin Abdelkader	Interference	41:35	2:00
3rd	BC	Matt Greene	Charging the Goaltender	43:39	2:00
3rd	MSU	Ethan Graham	Roughing	47:51	2:00
3rd	BC	Kyle Kucharski	Slashing	47:51	2:00
3rd	BC	Tim Filangieri	Hooking	49:47	2:00

Shots by period
Team	1	2	3	T
Michigan State	6	12	11	29
Boston College	13	6	11	30

Goaltenders
Team	Name	Saves	Goals against	Time on ice
MSU	Jeff Lerg	29	1	60:00
BC	Cory Schneider	26	2	59:41

== Record by conference ==
Conference	# of Bids	Record	Win %	Regional Finals	Frozen Four	Championship Game	Champions
Hockey East	5	6–5	.545	3	2	1	–
CCHA	4	6–3	.666	3	1	1	1
WCHA	3	3–3	.500	2	1	–	–
ECACHL	2	0–2	.000	–	–	–	–
Atlantic Hockey	1	0–1	.000	–	–	–	–
CHA	1	0–1	.000	–	–	–	–

== All-Tournament team ==
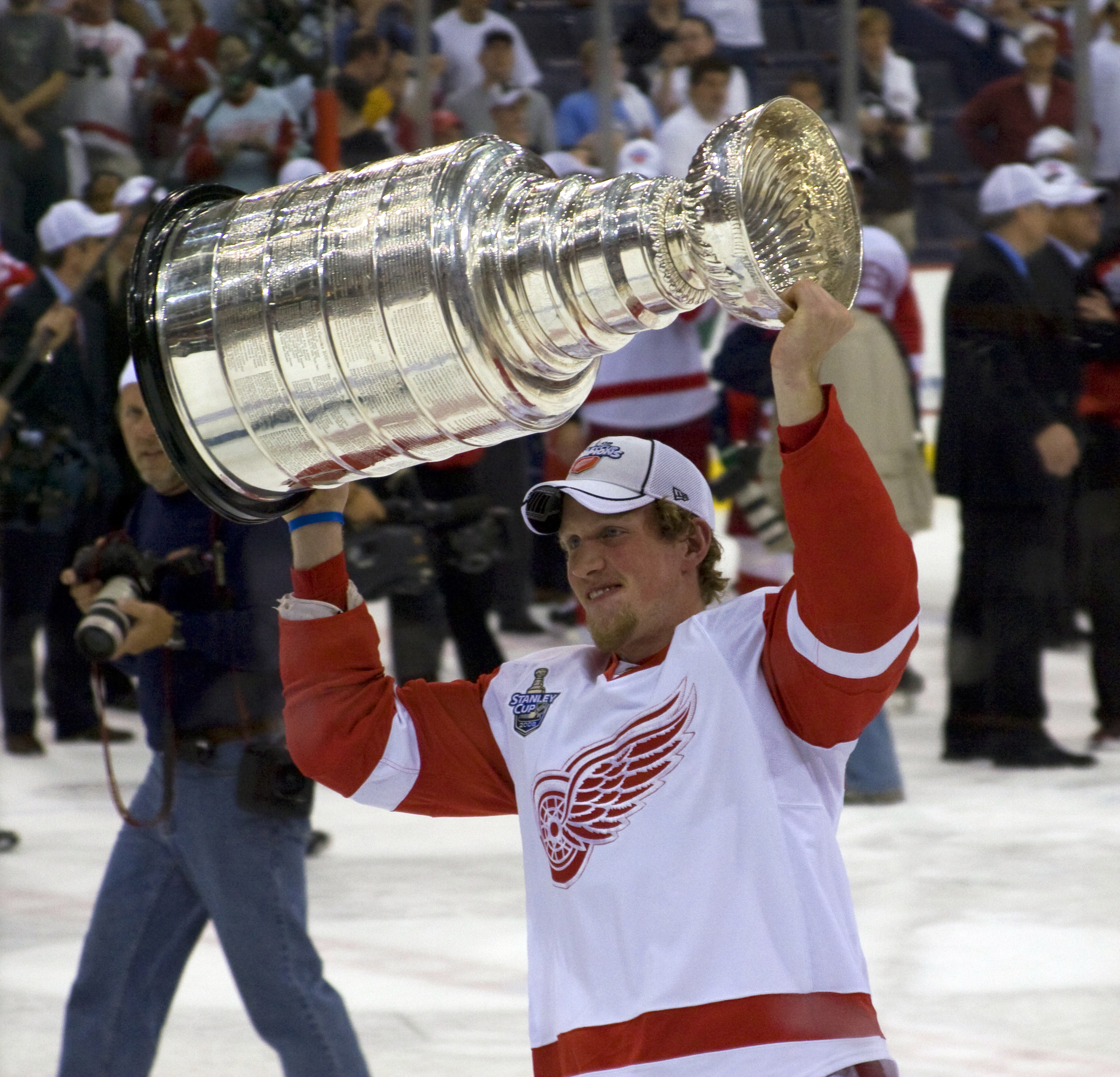
Justin Abdelkader, pictured here with the Detroit Red Wings, was named the tournament's Most Outstanding Player.

=== Frozen Four ===
- G: Jeff Lerg (Michigan State)
- D: Tyler Howells (Michigan State)
- D: Brian Boyle (Boston College)
- F: Justin Abdelkader* (Michigan State)
- F: Nathan Gerbe (Boston College)
- F: Tim Kennedy (Michigan State)

* Most Outstanding Player(s)
