= Jeff Lerg =

American ice hockey player (born 1986)

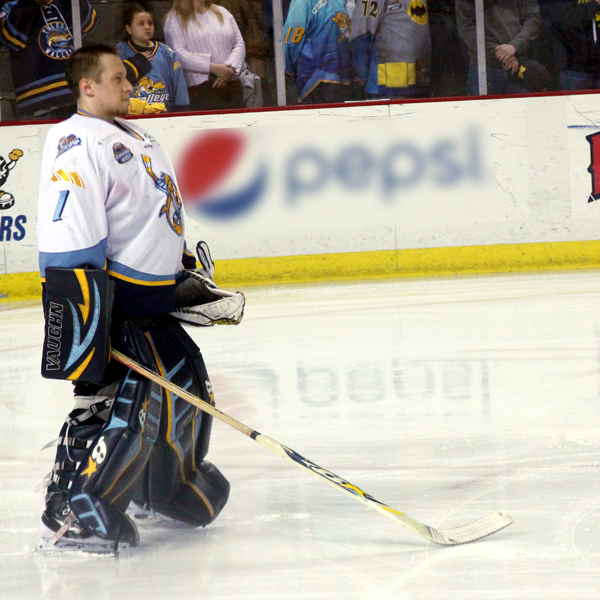
- Lerg with the Toledo Walleye in 2015
- Born: April 9, 1986 (age 40) Livonia, Michigan, U.S.
- Height: 5 ft 6 in (168 cm)
- Weight: 163 lb (74 kg; 11 st 9 lb)
- Position: Goaltender
- Caught: Left
- Played for: Toledo Walleye; HC Asiago; Ours de Villard-de-Lans; San Diego Gulls; Rungsted Seier Capital; Rapaces de Gap; River City Lancers; Omaha Lancers; Michigan State University; Trenton Devils
- NHL draft: Undrafted
- Playing career: 2009–2019

Jeff Lerg (born April 9, 1986) is an American former professional ice hockey goaltender who played in the North American minor league, most notably for the Toledo Walleye of the ECHL, and in Europe.

== Playing career ==
Prior to his college hockey career, Lerg played for the Omaha Lancers of the USHL. He led the league in shutouts, GAA, wins, minutes played and ranked second in save percentage. Lerg broke the USHL record for wins in a season with 36 in helping lead Omaha to a share of the regular-season title. Lerg joined the Michigan State Spartans in 2005 and was named CCHA Rookie of the Year for his outstanding performance as a freshman. He was a member of Michigan State's 2007 NCAA Championship team where he held a 1.25 GAA and .954 save percentage in the tournament. In 2008, he was selected as a finalist for the James E. Sullivan Award, given to the top amateur athlete in the United States each year.

He led the Michigan State Spartans as captain during the 2008–09 season, in which he broke the CCHA saves record and placed second on the NCAA all-time saves list on Senior night at the Munn.

On July 31, 2009, Lerg signed with the Lowell Devils of the American Hockey League. After two injury hampered seasons within the Lowell Devils, playing primarily for ECHL affiliate. the Trenton Titans, Lerg spent a season with HC Asiago of the Serie A. During the 2011–12 season, Lerg played in 24 games with HC Asiago and held a 2.64 GAA and a .921 save percentage.

On April 23, 2012, Lerg signed with Ours de Villard-de-Lans of the Ligue Magnus. After two successful seasons with Villard, Lerg returned to North America and signed a one-year contract with the Toledo Walleye of the ECHL on July 16, 2014.

On November 20, 2014, Lerg was signed to a Professional Try Out by the Grand Rapids Griffins. Following the game on November 21, the Griffins released Lerg from his professional try out. On March 9, 2015, Lerg was signed to a second professional try out by the Griffins.

Lerg was named the ECHL Goaltender of the Month for the month of November. He went 7–0–1, with one shutout, a 2.65 GAA and a .922 save percentage in eight appearances during the month as the Walleye went 10–2–1 in November. Lerg allowed two goals or less in four of his eight appearances.

Lerg was named the CCM ECHL goaltender of the week for the week ending March 22. Lerg went 3–0–0 with one shutout, a 0.65 GAA and a .975 save percentage in three appearances last week, helping the Walleye extend their unbeaten streak to eight games (7–0–1). Lerg set a Walleye franchise record for the most wins in one season, with 31 wins, and most shutouts in one season, with four shutouts. His 31 wins is tied for first in the league, while he ranks second with a 2.32 GAA, and third with a .921 save percentage.

On December 28, 2015, Lerg was signed to a professional try-out by the Grand Rapids Griffins. Lerg played in 17 games with the Toledo Walleye, ranking eighth among ECHL goaltenders with a 2.01 GAA to go along with a 12–3–0 record, a 0.929 save percentage and one shutout.

On July 21, 2016, Lerg opted to return overseas, signing a one-year deal as a free agent with Danish club, Rungsted Seier Capital, of the Metal Ligaen. After 23 games and unable to guide Capital to the post-season, Lerg returned to rejoin the Toledo Walleye on January 28, 2017.

After another season in the Ligue Magnus with Rapaces de Gap, Lerg returned for one more stint with the Toledo Walleye of the ECHL at the tail end of the 2018–19 season as an emergency goaltender. In the penultimate game of the regular season, Lerg made his lone and last appearance in a 6–3 defeat to the Brampton Beast on April 6, 2019, finishing as the Walleye's All-time leader with 92 appearances.

== Personal life ==
Lerg is the cousin of Bryan Lerg. They were teammates at Michigan State University from 2005–06 to 2007–08.

== Career statistics ==
			Regular season									Playoffs
Season	Team	League	GP	W	L	T/OT	MIN	GA	SO	GAA	SV%	GP	W	L	MIN	GA	SO	GAA	SV%
2003–04	River City Lancers	USHL	35	24	5	2	1963	72	4	2.20	.917	3	0	2	183	0	7	2.29	.929
2004–05	Omaha Lancers	USHL	52	36	11	4	3105	112	6	2.16	.916	5	2	3	298	1	10	2.01	.931
2005–06	Michigan State University	CCHA	31	17	6	6	1840	60	3	1.96	.928	—	—	—	—	—	—	—	—
2006–07	Michigan State University	CCHA	42	26	13	3	2465	99	3	2.41	.913	—	—	—	—	—	—	—	—
2007–08	Michigan State University	CCHA	41	24	12	5	2464	91	4	2.22	.926	—	—	—	—	—	—	—	—
2008–09	Michigan State University	CCHA	32	9	20	3	1921	94	2	2.94	.917	—	—	—	—	—	—	—	—
2009–10	Trenton Devils	ECHL	2	1	1	0	120	11	0	5.50	.810	—	—	—	—	—	—	—	—
2010–11	Trenton Devils	ECHL	27	12	12	1	1545	81	0	3.15	.903	—	—	—	—	—	—	—	—
2011–12	HC Asiago	ITL	24	13	11	0	1475	65	3	2.64	.921	3	0	3	139	0	12	5.16	.844
2012–13	Ours de Villard-de-Lans	FRA	25	12	11	1	1505	0	87	3.47	.912	4	1	3	242	14	0	3.47	.929
2013–14	Ours de Villard-de-Lans	FRA	26	13	11	2	1549	0	86	3.33	.910	8	4	4	505	28	0	3.32	.907
2014–15	Toledo Walleye	ECHL	45	32	9	3	2635	104	4	2.37	.920	15	7	8	956	35	0	2.20	.924
2015–16	Toledo Walleye	ECHL	42	28	11	3	2514	91	3	2.17	.925	5	1	3	256	13	0	3.05	.902
2015–16	San Diego Gulls	AHL	1	0	0	0	25	0	0	0.00	1.000	—	—	—	—	—	—	—	—
2016–17	Rungsted Seier Capital	DEN	23	—	—	—	—	—	—	2.59	.903	—	—	—	—	—	—	—	—
2016–17	Toledo Walleye	ECHL	5	3	1	1	300	17	0	3.40	.890	10	6	4	565	24	1	2.55	.913
2017–18	Rapaces de Gap	FRA	38	25	11	2	2273	104	1	2.75	.902	4	—	—	—	—	—	3.61	.861
2018–19	Toledo Walleye	ECHL	1	0	1	0	60	6	0	6.00	.854	—	—	—	—	—	—	—	—
ECHL totals			121	76	34	8	7114	304	7	2.56	.915	30	14	15	1777	72	1	2.43	.917

== Awards and honors ==
Award	Year
USHL Dave Tyler Junior Player of the Year Award	2005
USHL Goaltender of the Year	2005
USA Hockey Junior Player of the Year	2005
All-CCHA Rookie Team	2005–06
CCHA Rookie of the Year	2005–06
CCHA All-Tournament Team	2006
CCHA Most Valuable Player in Tournament	2006
All-NCAA All-Tournament Team	2007
USA Hockey College Player of the Year	2007
All-CCHA First Team	2007–08
AHCA West Second-Team All-American	2007–08
All-CCHA Second Team	2008–09
Senior CLASS Award	2009
NCAA Top VIII Award	2010
Ligue Magnus Jean Ferrand Trophy	2014
All-ECHL Second Team	2014–15

Awards and achievements
Preceded by Bill Thomas	CCHA Rookie of the Year; 2005–06	Succeeded by Mark Letestu
Preceded by Jeff Tambellini	CCHA Most Valuable Player in Tournament; 2006	Succeeded by David Brown
Preceded by Jeff Jakaitis	Perani Cup Champion; 2006–07	Succeeded by Kevin Porter
Preceded by Michael Eickman	CCHA Scholar-Athlete of the Year; 2007–08	Succeeded by Jordan Pearce
Preceded by Justin Abdelkader	Ilitch Humanitarian Award; 2008–09; With: Jerad Kaufmann	Succeeded by Dion Knelsen
