= Ryan Mahrle =

American ice hockey player (born 1985)

- Born: February 8, 1985 (age 40) Troy, Michigan, U.S.
- Height: 5 ft 11 in (180 cm)
- Weight: 175 lb (79 kg; 12 st 7 lb)
- Position: Defense
- Shot: Right
- EIHL team: Newcastle Vipers
- NHL draft: Undrafted
- Playing career: 2007–2010

Ryan Mahrle (born February 8, 1985) is an American professional ice hockey defenseman for the Newcastle Vipers of the EIHL.

== Playing career ==
Undrafted, Mahrle completed his amateur career with Western Michigan University of the CCHA. Ryan turned professional after his senior year with the Broncos, playing with the Kalamazoo Wings of the UHL, at the end of the 2006-07 season. Ryan then spent the next two seasons in the ECHL with the Gwinnett Gladiators and the Bakersfield Condors.

On June 4, 2009, Mahrle was signed to a one-year contract with the Newcastle Vipers of the EIHL.

== Career statistics ==
			Regular season					Playoffs
Season	Team	League	GP	G	A	Pts	PIM	GP	G	A	Pts	PIM
2003–04	Western Michigan Broncos	CCHA	39	6	13	19	20	—	—	—	—	—
2004–05	Western Michigan Broncos	CCHA	37	5	11	16	36	—	—	—	—	—
2005–06	Western Michigan Broncos	CCHA	39	3	15	18	47	—	—	—	—	—
2006–07	Western Michigan Broncos	CCHA	37	2	15	17	36	—	—	—	—	—
2006–07	Kalamazoo Wings	UHL	13	0	9	9	8	20	4	6	10	16
2007–08	Gwinnett Gladiators	ECHL	72	4	14	18	42	8	1	1	2	2
2008–09	Gwinnett Gladiators	ECHL	8	1	3	4	6	—	—	—	—	—
2008–09	Bakersfield Condors	ECHL	59	4	20	24	34	7	1	3	4	4
2009–10	Newcastle Vipers	EIHL	54	8	27	35	34	2	0	0	0	0
ECHL Totals			139	9	37	46	82	15	2	4	6	6
