= Nathan Ward (ice hockey) =

Canadian ice hockey player

- Born: December 8, 1981 (age 44) Edmonton, Alberta, Canada
- Height: 6 ft 1 in (185 cm)
- Weight: 200 lb (91 kg; 14 st 4 lb)
- Position: Centre
- Shot: Left
- team: Flint Generals
- Played for: Odessa Jackalopes (CHL); Manchester Phoenix (EPIHL); Flint Generals (IHL)
- Playing career: 2006–2010

Nathan Ward (born December 8, 1981) is a Canadian former professional ice hockey player.

== Career ==
Ward's senior level career began with his move into the NCAA for Lake Superior State University (LSSU). Ward established himself quickly, and in his first season managed to score 10 points in 38 games.

Ward continued to be a key player for LSSU, and in the following three seasons totaled 54 points, missing only a handful of games. After Ward had finished playing for LSSU, he moved to sign for the Odessa Jackalopes in the Central Hockey League. Despite it being Ward's first professional hockey season, he averaged almost a point every two games. This productivity persuaded the Jackalopes to re-sign Ward for the 2007–08 term. Ward improved again, this time managing 63 points in 64 games, and helping the Jackalopes into the post-season.

In the summer of 2008, Ward took the decision to play his hockey outside North America for the first time, signing with the Manchester Phoenix to play under head coach Tony Hand. Ward moved to Manchester in July 2008 along with his Jackalopes teammate Alex Dunn. A successful season followed in Manchester, with the organisation reaching both domestic cup finals and making the play-offs. Ward was key to the success, proving himself as a play-maker and goal-scorer. Despite the team's on-ice improvement, financial problems continued and the Phoenix moved into the EPL at the end of the season. This considerably limited the budget available, and consequently much of the senior squad, including Ward, was released and signed on September 25, 2009, by Flint Generals.

== Career stats ==
			Regular season					Playoffs				
Season	Team	League	GP	G	A	Pts	PIM	GP	G	A	Pts	PIM
2002–03	Lake Superior State University	NCAA	38	6	4	10	12	-	-	-	-	-
2003–04	Lake Superior State University	NCAA	35	5	10	15	6	-	-	-	-	-
2004–05	Lake Superior State University	NCAA	38	9	8	17	34	-	-	-	-	-
2005–06	Lake Superior State University	NCAA	36	8	14	22	29	-	-	-	-	-
2006–07	Odessa Jackalopes	CHL	62	9	21	30	32	-	-	-	-	-
2007–08	Odessa Jackalopes	CHL	64	20	43	63	40	7	0	2	2	8
2008–09	Manchester Phoenix	EIHL	68	18	38	56	51	2				
2009–10	Flint Generals	IHL	76	9	17	26	29	12	1	2	3	6
Career Totals												
