= Nathan Davis (ice hockey) =

American ice hockey player

- Born: May 23, 1986 (age 40) Rocky River, Ohio, USA
- Height: 6 ft 1 in (185 cm)
- Weight: 205 lb (93 kg; 14 st 9 lb)
- Position: Center
- Shot: Left
- Played for: Miami; Rockford IceHogs
- National team: United States
- NHL draft: 113th overall, 2005; Chicago Blackhawks
- Playing career: 2004–2010
- Coaching career

Biographical details
- Education: Miami University; University of Colorado

Coaching career (HC unless noted)
- 2014–2015: Colorado (assistant)
Medal record
Representing United States
Ice hockey
World Under-18 Championships
Silver medal – second place	2004 Minsk

Nathan Davis is an American lawyer and former ice hockey coach and center who was an All-American for Miami.

== Career ==
Davis spent two years with the USNTDP, playing alongside future NHL players like Phil Kessel, Jack Skille and Jack Johnson. After winning a silver medal at the 2004 World U18 Championships, Davis began attending Miami University. He proved to be a solid addition to the team in his freshman season, finishing 1 off of the team lead with 14 goals. He was selected by the Chicago Blackhawks in the 4th round of the 2005 Draft. He responded by leading the RedHawks in scoring as a sophomore and leading the team to just the second 1st-place finish in program history. During the season, Davis was a member of the United States national junior team. They finished a disappointing 4th for the 2006 World Junior Championships.

Davis was named an alternate captain for his junior season and continued to lead the team in scoring. He was named an All-American for the year and led the program to its first ever NCAA Tournament victory, scoring the first goal in a 2–1 win. After the season, Davis played for the US national team but went scoreless in seven games. He returned to Miami for his senior year but things couldn't have started worse. He injured his shoulder in the season opener and missed several games. The team was able to persevere without their star center and ended up post the best record in program history. Davis would eventually rejoin the team, playing in half of their games, and led Miami into the postseason with the 2nd overall seed. In the first game of the tournament, Davis reinjured his shoulder and he was unable to participate in the quarterfinal game against Boston College. Miami ended up losing the match 3–4 in overtime.

After graduating cum laude with a degree in political science, Davis signed with the Blackhawks and was assigned to the Rockford IceHogs. After playing just over half of the team's games in 2009, he was limited to just 23 appearances in his second season. Rather than continue fighting through the injury that never fully healed, Davis retired from professional hockey.

He returned to Ohio and worked as an intern for Senator Sherrod Brown. He had another brief stint as a sales representative for the Wirtz Beverage Group, operated by the owners of the Chicago Blackhawks. He tried yet a third career, this time as an account executive with Evolve Vacation Rental Network in Denver, Colorado. In 2013 he decided to go back to school and earn a J. D. He attended the University of Colorado Law School for three years, graduating in 2016. While there he served as a legal intern for NBCUniversal and also joined the school's club team as a coach. After passing the bar, Davis joined the Holland & Hart law firm as an associate. He remains with the LLP as of 2021.

== Career statistics ==
=== Regular season and playoffs ===
			Regular season					Playoffs
Season	Team	League	GP	G	A	Pts	PIM	GP	G	A	Pts	PIM
2001–02	Cleveland Barons 14U AAA	14U AAA	—	—	—	—	—	—	—	—	—	—
2002–03	U.S. NTDP U18	NAHL	20	2	3	5	23	—	—	—	—	—
2003–04	U.S. NTDP U18	NAHL	11	3	6	9	17	—	—	—	—	—
2003–04	U.S. NTDP U18	USDP	46	7	8	15	18	—	—	—	—	—
2004–05	Miami Redhawks	CCHA	38	14	11	25	30	—	—	—	—	—
2005–06	Miami Redhawks	CCHA	37	20	20	40	34	—	—	—	—	—
2006–07	Miami Redhawks	CCHA	42	21	29	50	24	—	—	—	—	—
2007–08	Miami Redhawks	CCHA	21	8	9	17	14	—	—	—	—	—
2008–09	Rockford IceHogs	AHL	49	5	7	12	16	—	—	—	—	—
2009–10	Rockford IceHogs	AHL	23	8	3	11	10	—	—	—	—	—
CCHA totals			138	63	69	132	102	—	—	—	—	—
AHL totals			72	13	10	23	26	—	—	—	—	—

=== International ===
Year	Team	Event	Result	GP	G	A	Pts	PIM
2004	United States	WJC18	2nd place, silver medalist(s)	6	1	1	2	2
2006	United States	WJC	4th	7	0	1	1	4
2007	United States	WC	5th	7	0	0	0	2
Junior totals				13	1	2	3	6
Senior totals				7	0	0	0	2

== Awards and honors ==
Award	Year
All-CCHA First Team	2005–06
All-CCHA Second Team	2006–07
AHCA West Second-Team All-American	2006–07

Awards and achievements
Preceded by Drew Miller	CCHA Best Defensive Forward; 2006–07	Succeeded by Justin Abdelkader
