= Ryan Jones (ice hockey) =

Canadian ice hockey player (born 1984)

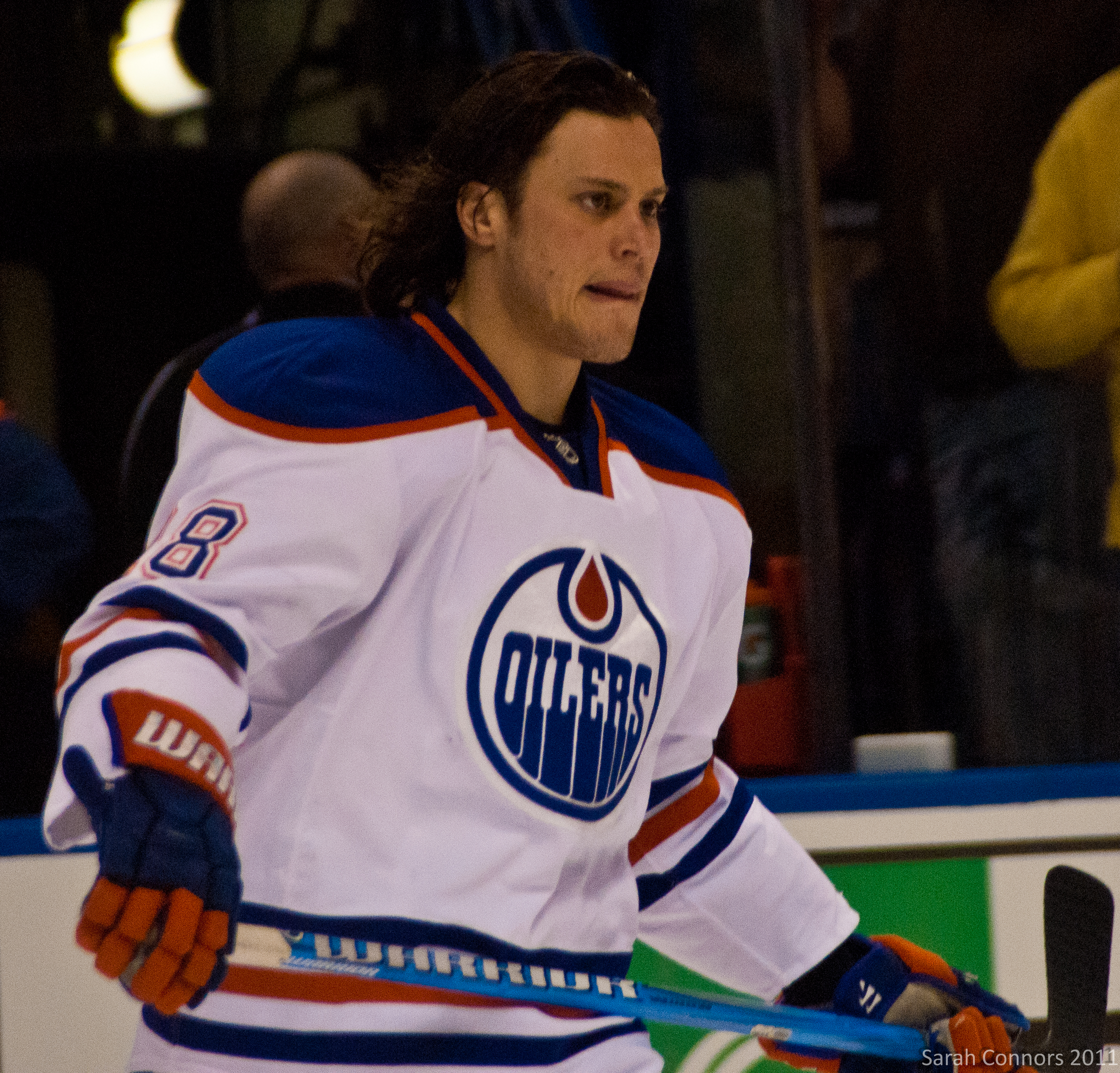
- Jones in St. Louis, January, 2013
- Born: June 14, 1984 (age 42) Chatham, Ontario, Canada
- Height: 6 ft 1 in (185 cm)
- Weight: 208 lb (94 kg; 14 st 12 lb)
- Position: Right wing
- Shot: Left
- Played for: Nashville Predators; Edmonton Oilers; Kölner Haie
- NHL draft: 111th overall, 2004; Minnesota Wild
- Playing career: 2008–2019

Ryan Michael Stewart Jones (born June 14, 1984) is a Canadian former professional ice hockey right winger. He was drafted in the fourth round, 111th overall, by the Minnesota Wild in the 2004 NHL entry draft and played for the Nashville Predators and Edmonton Oilers in the National Hockey League (NHL). He played out the remainder of his professional career with Kölner Haie of the Deutsche Eishockey Liga (DEL).

== Playing career ==
=== Amateur ===
Jones grew up in Chatham, Ontario, playing minor hockey for the Chatham Cobras A program of the Ontario Minor Hockey Association (OMHA). He graduated to AAA hockey for the Chatham-Kent Cyclones of the Pavilion League before playing one season with the Blenheim Blades Jr C team and two seasons with the Chatham Maroons Jr.B. hockey club of the OHA.

Jones was selected by the Minnesota Wild in the fourth round of the 2004 NHL entry draft after his second season with the Maroons.

Jones earned a scholarship to play in the NCAA at Miami University in Oxford, Ohio, spending four years with the RedHawks men's ice hockey program in the Central Collegiate Hockey Association (CCHA).

=== Professional ===
Jones made his NHL debut with the Nashville Predators in the 2008–09 season opener. He scored his first career NHL goal on October 15 against goaltender Marty Turco of the Dallas Stars.

During the 2009–10 season, Jones was placed on waivers by the Predators and was subsequently claimed by the Edmonton Oilers on March 3, 2010.

Jones has affectionately been given the nickname "Junkman" by many of his fans, partly due to his propensity for so-called "garbage goals" and partly because he shares the same last name as former Major League Baseball pitcher Randy "Junkman" Jones.

On December 2, 2011, Jones scored his first career NHL hat-trick, scoring three third period goals in a 6–3 victory over the Columbus Blue Jackets.

After four seasons with the Oilers, Jones opted to explore free agency before later re-signing with Edmonton on a one-year contract on July 6, 2013.

On October 9, 2014, as an unrestricted free agent entering the 2014–15 season, Jones signed a professional try-out contract with the Utica Comets of the American Hockey League (AHL), the top minor league affiliate of the Vancouver Canucks. After just five games with the Comets, in which he added one assist, Jones was released from his try-out. On November 17, he then signed his first contract abroad, joining German Kölner Haie in the Deutsche Eishockey Liga (DEL) for the remainder of the playing season. On February 19, 2015, the Kölner Haie and Jones agreed on a two-year contract extension lasting until 2017.

After playing in his fifth season with Kölner Haie, following a semi-final defeat in the 2018–19 season, Jones announced his retirement from professional hockey after 12 seasons.

== Career statistics ==
			Regular season					Playoffs
Season	Team	League	GP	G	A	Pts	PIM	GP	G	A	Pts	PIM
2001–02	Blenheim Blades	GLJHL	18	26	18	44	22	—	—	—	—	—
2002–03	Chatham Maroons	WOHL	38	12	11	23	42	—	—	—	—	—
2003–04	Chatham Maroons	WOHL	46	39	30	69	64	17	17	9	26	25
2004–05	Miami RedHawks	CCHA	38	8	7	15	79	—	—	—	—	—
2005–06	Miami RedHawks	CCHA	39	22	13	35	72	—	—	—	—	—
2006–07	Miami RedHawks	CCHA	42	29	19	48	88	—	—	—	—	—
2007–08	Miami RedHawks	CCHA	42	31	18	49	83	—	—	—	—	—
2007–08	Houston Aeros	AHL	4	0	0	0	2	4	1	1	2	2
2008–09	Nashville Predators	NHL	46	7	10	17	22	—	—	—	—	—
2008–09	Milwaukee Admirals	AHL	25	13	9	22	30	11	4	3	7	10
2009–10	Nashville Predators	NHL	41	7	4	11	18	—	—	—	—	—
2009–10	Milwaukee Admirals	AHL	15	4	1	5	15	—	—	—	—	—
2009–10	Edmonton Oilers	NHL	8	1	0	1	8	—	—	—	—	—
2010–11	Edmonton Oilers	NHL	81	18	7	25	34	—	—	—	—	—
2011–12	Edmonton Oilers	NHL	79	17	16	33	42	—	—	—	—	—
2012–13	Edmonton Oilers	NHL	27	2	5	7	17	—	—	—	—	—
2013–14	Oklahoma City Barons	AHL	4	2	0	2	2	—	—	—	—	—
2013–14	Edmonton Oilers	NHL	52	2	4	6	40	—	—	—	—	—
2014–15	Utica Comets	AHL	5	0	1	1	9	—	—	—	—	—
2014–15	Kölner Haie	DEL	30	12	5	17	20	—	—	—	—	—
2015–16	Kölner Haie	DEL	41	15	15	30	55	11	3	2	5	4
2016–17	Kölner Haie	DEL	49	19	11	30	49	7	0	1	1	8
2017–18	Kölner Haie	DEL	52	15	14	29	8	6	1	1	2	2
2018–19	Kölner Haie	DEL	52	6	14	20	18	11	3	3	6	12
NHL totals			334	54	46	100	181	—	—	—	—	—
DEL totals			224	67	59	126	150	35	7	7	14	26

== Awards and honors ==
Award	Year
College
All-CCHA Second team	2005–06
CCHA All-Tournament Team	2006, 2008
All-CCHA Second team	2006–07
All-CCHA First Team	2007–08
AHCA West First-Team All-American	2007–08
