= Justin Abdelkader =

American ice hockey player (born 1987)

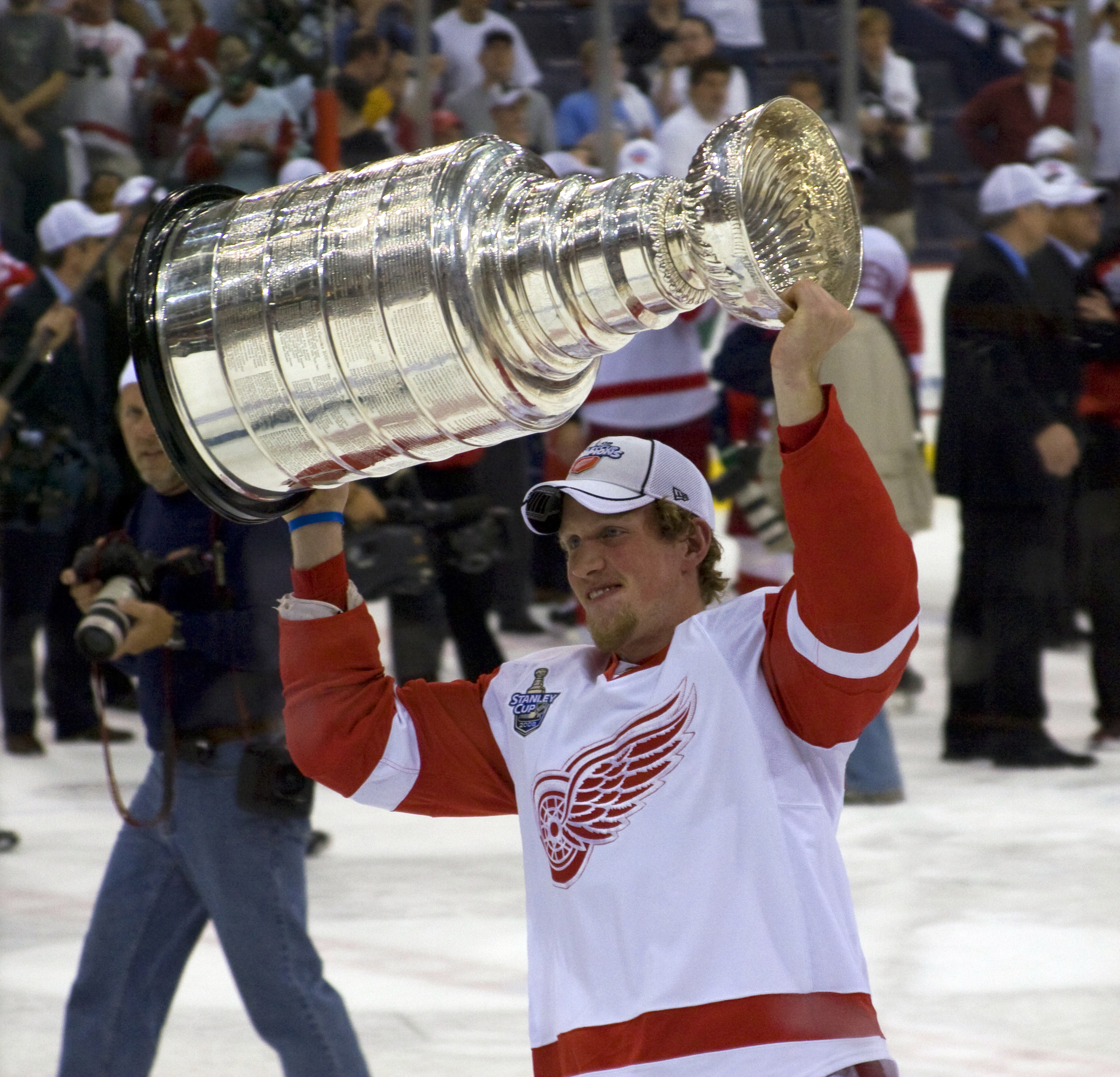
- Abdelkader with the Detroit Red Wings in 2008
- Born: February 25, 1987 (age 39) Muskegon, Michigan, U.S.
- Height: 6 ft 3 in (191 cm)
- Weight: 214 lb (97 kg; 15 st 4 lb)
- Position: Left wing
- Shot: Left
- Played for: Detroit Red Wings; EV Zug; HC Lugano
- National team: United States
- NHL draft: 42nd overall, 2005; Detroit Red Wings
- Playing career: 2008–2023

Justin Abdelkader (/ˈæbdəlkeɪdər/; born February 25, 1987) is an American former professional ice hockey winger. He played for the Detroit Red Wings in the National Hockey League (NHL), as well as EV Zug and HC Lugano of the National League (NL). He was drafted 42nd overall by the Red Wings in the 2005 NHL entry draft.

== Playing career ==
=== Amateur ===
Abdelkader played for the junior ice hockey Cedar Rapids RoughRiders of the United States Hockey League during his senior year of high school, scoring 27 goals and 52 points and helping the team win the 2004–05 Clark Cup Championship. He then began a three-year stint playing college ice hockey for the Michigan State Spartans men's ice hockey team of what was then the Central Collegiate Hockey Association.

On April 7, 2007, Abdelkader scored the game-winning goal in the 2007 NCAA Championship Game against Boston College, securing the NCAA Division 1 National Championship for Michigan State University and earning him the Frozen Four Most Outstanding Player. He scored the latest game-winning regulation goal ever scored in an NCAA Frozen Four championship game when he scored with just 18.9 seconds left.

=== Professional ===
==== Detroit Red Wings ====
Abdelkader was drafted 42nd overall by the Detroit Red Wings in the 2005 NHL entry draft.

On April 3, 2008, Abdelkader signed a one-game amateur tryout with the Detroit Red Wings of the National Hockey League and was to play that night against the Columbus Blue Jackets. In doing so, he forfeited his college eligibility for the 2008–09 season. The following day, Abdelkader signed a three-year contract with the Detroit Red Wings. He played one more game that season for Detroit. When Detroit won the Stanley Cup in June, Abdelkader was part of the team celebration. He was included in the team picture and awarded a Stanley Cup Ring. Abdelkader did not play enough games to qualify for engravement on the Stanley Cup in 2008.

Abdelkader scored 24 goals for the Grand Rapids Griffins during the 2008–09 season and was one of the team's best offensive players in the playoffs.

On May 8, 2009, Abdelkader was brought up to the Red Wings as the replacement for Tomáš Kopecký, who sat out Game 5 of the Western Conference semi-finals series against the Anaheim Ducks. Coach Mike Babcock sent Abdelkader to replace Kopecký "because he'll run over people. We expect him to play hard like Darren Helm. He's on the forecheck, and he's a physical guy." During the game, Abdelkader scored his first career point on an assist to Johan Franzén.

Abdelkader scored his first career NHL goal on May 30, 2009, in Game 1 of the 2009 Stanley Cup Finals against the Pittsburgh Penguins. After shooting the puck, he grabbed the rebound out of the air with his glove, dropped the puck, and beat Marc-André Fleury high stick side. His second goal came nearly 24 hours later in the second game of the series, off of what commentators described as a "knuckle puck." The goal came at practically the same time in the third period as the goal he'd scored the night before. He carried the puck into the forward zone alone against three Penguins defenders, controlled the bouncing puck, and fired a slapshot past Fleury. He became the first rookie to score a goal in consecutive finals games since Minnesota's Dino Ciccarelli did it in 1981.

During the 2009–10 season, Abdelkader played 50 games for the Red Wings, scoring three goals while adding three assists. The Red Wings then re-signed Abdelkader on a two-year extension worth $1.575 million.

The 2010–11 season was Abdelkader's first full NHL season as a Red Wing. Abdelkader played in 74 games, scoring seven goals and adding 12 assists.

During the 2011–12 season, he missed only one game and finished the season with eight goals and 14 assists in 81 games.

On September 14, 2012, Abdelkader signed a four-year, $7.2 million contract with the Detroit Red Wings.

On October 9, 2015, Abdelkader became the second player in Red Wings history to score a hat trick in a season-opening home game, following Adam Brown in 1945. Abdelkader was named the First Star of the Week for the week ending October 12, 2015. He shared the league lead with four goals and tied for second in the NHL with five points. On November 12, 2015, the Red Wings signed Abdelkader to a seven-year, $29.75 million contract extension.

On October 6, 2020, Abdelkader was placed on waivers by the Red Wings to buy out the remaining three years of his contract.

==== EV Zug and HC Lugano ====
On February 3, 2021, Abdelkader joined EV Zug of the National League (NL) for the remainder of the 2020–21 season. He made his debut on February 23, 2021, in a 4–3 overtime victory against Genève-Servette HC at the Patinoire des Vernets. Abdelkader went on to win the 2021 NL title with EV Zug, recording six goals and three assists in 13 playoff games.

On February 24, 2022, Abdelkader joined HC Lugano of the NL for the remainder of the 2021–22 season. He recorded one assist in six regular season games. He recorded two goals and three assists in six games during the playoffs.

On December 20, 2022, Abdelkader signed with EV Zug for the remainder of the 2022–23 season.

== International play ==
Medal record

Representing United States

Ice hockey

World Championships
Bronze medal – third place	2021 Latvia	

World Junior Championships
Bronze medal – third place	2007 Sweden	

Abdelkader was selected to play for the United States national junior team at the 2007 World Junior Ice Hockey Championships in Sweden.

Abdelkader was selected to play for the United States national team at the 2014 IIHF World Championship, where he was named team captain. Abdelkader was suspended for one game at the World Championships for a knee-to-knee hit infraction on Konstantin Pushkaryov in a game against Kazakhstan. Following Abdelkader's one-game suspension, he returned for the game against Germany, where he scored two goals, including the game-winning goal, in the final group stage game to lead the United States to the quarterfinals. During the United States' quarterfinal game against the Czech Republic, Abdelkader was assessed a five-minute major and a game misconduct for charging Vladimír Sobotka in the second period. In July 2014, the IIHF announced that he would be suspended for three games at the 2015 IIHF World Championship for the hit on Sobotka (Adbelkader is only required to serve the suspension if he appears at that tournament). Abdelkader finished the tournament with three goals and one assist in seven games.

Abdelkader represented the United States at the 2016 World Cup of Hockey, where he recorded one goal in three games.

== Personal life ==
Abdelkader is the son of Joseph and Sheryl Abdelkader. The surname Abdelkader is Arabic. His paternal grandfather, Yusuf Abdul Qadir, anglicized to Joseph Abdelkader, emigrated from Jordan at the age of 19 to Muskegon, Michigan and married a Polish woman named Zuzanna (Susie).

He went to Churchill Elementary School and Mona Shores Middle School and graduated from Mona Shores High School in 2005. He was named to the all-state hockey team and awarded the Mr. Hockey award, given to the top high school ice hockey player in Michigan. During his senior year, he played for the Cedar Rapids RoughRiders of the USHL.

Abdelkader received his Bachelor of Arts in General Management from Michigan State's Eli Broad College of Business on December 18, 2015.

Abdelkader proposed to his longtime girlfriend Julie Leshkevich in November 2016 at the Joe Louis Arena. The couple married on July 21, 2017, and gave birth to their first child in September 2018.

== Career statistics ==
=== Regular season and playoffs ===
			Regular season					Playoffs
Season	Team	League	GP	G	A	Pts	PIM	GP	G	A	Pts	PIM
2003–04	Mona Shores High School	HS–MI	28	37	43	80	—	—	—	—	—	—
2004–05	Cedar Rapids RoughRiders	USHL	60	27	25	52	86	11	0	4	4	8
2005–06	Michigan State Spartans	CCHA	44	10	12	22	83	—	—	—	—	—
2006–07	Michigan State Spartans	CCHA	38	15	18	33	91	—	—	—	—	—
2007–08	Michigan State Spartans	CCHA	42	19	21	40	107	—	—	—	—	—
2007–08	Detroit Red Wings	NHL	2	0	0	0	2	—	—	—	—	—
2008–09	Grand Rapids Griffins	AHL	76	24	28	52	102	—	—	—	—	—
2008–09	Detroit Red Wings	NHL	2	0	0	0	0	10	2	1	3	0
2009–10	Grand Rapids Griffins	AHL	33	11	13	24	86	—	—	—	—	—
2009–10	Detroit Red Wings	NHL	50	3	3	6	35	11	1	1	2	36
2010–11	Detroit Red Wings	NHL	74	7	12	19	61	11	0	0	0	22
2011–12	Detroit Red Wings	NHL	81	8	14	22	62	5	0	0	0	2
2012–13	Detroit Red Wings	NHL	48	10	3	13	34	12	2	1	3	33
2013–14	Detroit Red Wings	NHL	70	10	18	28	31	5	0	2	2	6
2014–15	Detroit Red Wings	NHL	71	23	21	44	72	5	0	2	2	6
2015–16	Detroit Red Wings	NHL	82	19	23	42	120	5	1	0	1	35
2016–17	Detroit Red Wings	NHL	64	7	14	21	50	—	—	—	—	—
2017–18	Detroit Red Wings	NHL	75	13	22	35	78	—	—	—	—	—
2018–19	Detroit Red Wings	NHL	71	6	13	19	38	—	—	—	—	—
2019–20	Detroit Red Wings	NHL	49	0	3	3	25	—	—	—	—	—
2020–21	EV Zug	NL	9	4	4	8	22	13	6	3	9	47
2021–22	Grand Rapids Griffins	AHL	3	0	0	0	2	—	—	—	—	—
2021–22	HC Lugano	NL	6	0	1	1	33	6	2	3	5	22
2022–23	EV Zug	NL	24	2	3	5	41	5	1	2	3	8
NHL totals			739	106	146	252	608	64	6	7	13	140

=== International ===
Year	Team	Event	Result	GP	G	A	Pts	PIM
2007	United States	WJC	3rd place, bronze medalist(s)	7	0	2	2	10
2012	United States	WC	7th	8	1	3	4	4
2014	United States	WC	6th	7	3	1	4	31
2016	United States	WCH	7th	3	1	0	1	2
2021	United States	WC	3rd place, bronze medalist(s)	6	0	1	1	0
2022	United States	OG	5th	1	0	1	1	2
Junior totals				7	0	2	2	10
Senior totals				25	5	6	11	39

== Awards and honors ==
Award	Year
NCAA
National Champion (with Michigan State Spartans)	2007
NCAA Tournament MVP	2007
All-Tournament Team	2007
National League
Swiss National League Championship (with EV Zug)	2021

Awards and achievements
Preceded by Robbie Earl	NCAA Tournament Most Outstanding Player; 2007	Succeeded by Nathan Gerbe
Preceded by Nathan Davis	CCHA Best Defensive Forward; 2007–08	Succeeded by Tim Miller
Preceded by Tim Cook	Ilitch Humanitarian Award; 2007–08	Succeeded by Jeff Lerg / Jerad Kaufmann
