= 2007 CCHA men's ice hockey tournament =

2007 CCHA Men's ice hockey tournament
- 2007 CCHA Men's Ice Hockey Tournament logo
- Dates: March 2–17, 2007
- Teams: 12
- Finals site: Joe Louis Arena; Detroit, Michigan
- Champions: Notre Dame (1st title)
- Winning coach: Jeff Jackson (5th title)
- MVP: David Brown (Notre Dame)
- CCHA Men's Ice Hockey Tournaments

The 2007 CCHA Men's Ice Hockey Tournament was the 36th CCHA Men's Ice Hockey Tournament. It was played between March 2 and March 17, 2007. Opening round and quarterfinal games were played at campus sites, while the semifinals, third place, and championship games were played at Joe Louis Arena in Detroit, Michigan. By winning the tournament, Notre Dame won the Mason Cup and received the Central Collegiate Hockey Association's automatic bid to the 2007 NCAA Division I Men's Ice Hockey Tournament.

== Conference standings ==
Note: GP = Games played; W = Wins; L = Losses; T = Ties; PTS = Points; GF = Goals For; GA = Goals Against

2006–07 Central Collegiate Hockey Association standings
	Conference							Overall					
	GP	W	L	T	PTS	GF	GA	GP	W	L	T	GF	GA
#4 Notre Dame†*	28	21	4	3	45	90	51	42	32	7	3	143	70
#10 Michigan	28	18	9	1	37	119	85	41	26	14	1	174	129
#11 Miami	28	16	8	4	36	93	70	42	24	14	4	135	107
#1 Michigan State	28	15	10	3	33	81	65	42	26	13	3	137	102
Nebraska–Omaha	28	13	11	4	30	100	85	42	18	16	8	153	128
Western Michigan	28	14	13	1	29	85	93	37	18	18	1	120	126
Ohio State	28	12	12	4	28	89	86	37	15	17	5	120	120
Lake Superior State	28	11	14	3	25	65	74	43	21	19	3	111	110
Ferris State	28	10	16	2	22	70	92	39	14	22	3	107	126
Northern Michigan	28	10	17	1	21	66	80	41	15	24	2	96	123
Alaska	28	7	16	5	19	70	90	39	11	22	6	100	128
Bowling Green	28	5	22	1	11	51	108	38	7	29	2	75	147
Championship: Notre Dame † indicates conference regular season champion * indicates conference tournament champion Final rankings: USA Today/USA Hockey Magazine Top 15 Poll

== Bracket ==
First round March 2–4
5	Nebraska-Omaha	3*	7	—
12	Bowling Green	2	5	—
6	Western Michigan	2	6	1
11	Alaska	3*	2	3
7	Ohio State	6	2	2
10	Northern Michigan	2	3*	3
8	Lake Superior State	3	4	3
9	Ferris State	4*	3	2

Quarterfinals; March 9–10
1	Notre Dame	7	3	—
11	Alaska	1	1	—
2	Michigan	4	8	—
10	Northern Michigan	1	3	—
3	Miami	1	1	—
8	Lake Superior State	2	2	—
4	Michigan State	4	4	—
5	Nebraska-Omaha	2	1	—

Semifinals; March 16
1	Notre Dame	3
8	Lake Superior State	0
2	Michigan	5
4	Michigan State	2

Championship; March 17
1	Notre Dame	2
2	Michigan	1
Third place
4	Michigan State	7*
8	Lake Superior State	6

Note: * denotes overtime period(s)

=== First round ===
==== (5) Nebraska-Omaha vs. (12) Bowling Green ====
March 2	Nebraska-Omaha	3 – 2	OT	Bowling Green	Qwest Center Omaha	Recap
No Scoring		First period		13:33 - Derek Whitmore
Dan Charleston - 13:46		Second period		No scoring
Mick Lawrence - 04:35		Third period		16:06 - James Unger
Mick Lawrence - 04:24		First overtime period		No scoring
Jeremie Dupont ( 17 saves / 19 shots )		Goalie stats		Jimmy Spratt ( 38 saves / 41 shots )

March 3	Nebraska-Omaha	7 – 5	Bowling Green	Qwest Center Omaha	Recap
Eddie Del Grosso - pp - 09:19; Nick Fanto - 12:51; Nick Fanto - 13:36		First period	01:41 - James Unger; 11:52 - James Unger; 14:53 - James Unger; 17:57 - pp - James Unger
Brandon Scero - 06:20; Brandon Scero - pp - 13:12		Second period	No scoring
Brandon Scero - 10:57; Mark Bernier - 12:06		Third period	08:18 - pp - Derek Whitmore
Jeremie Dupont ( 5 saves / 9 shots ) Jerad Kaufmann ( 11 saves / 12 shots )		Goalie stats	Jimmy Spratt ( 31 saves / 38 shots )

Nebraska-Omaha won series 2–0

==== (6) Western Michigan vs. (11) Alaska ====
March 2	Western Michigan	2 – 3	OT	Alaska	Lawson Arena	Recap
No Scoring		First period		No scoring
Paul Szczechura - 07:27; Mark Letestu - pp - 19:54		Second period		No scoring
No scoring		Third period		17:38 - sh - Ryan Muspratt; 18:43 - Darcy Campbell
No scoring		First overtime period		04:09 - Lucas Burnett
Riley Gill ( 29 saves / 32 shots )		Goalie stats		Wylie Rogers ( 18 saves / 20 shots )

March 3	Western Michigan	6 – 2	Alaska	Lawson Arena	Recap
Paul Szczechura - sh - 02:42; Jeff LoVecchio - sh - 05:02; Mark Letestu - 16:15		First period	No scoring
Patrick Galivan - pp - 06:41		Second period	01:52 - Aaron Lee; 07:07 - Braden Walls
Mark Letestu - pp - 15:25; Paul Szczechura - 16:45		Third period	No scoring
Riley Gill ( 37 saves / 39 shots )		Goalie stats	Wylie Rogers ( 2 saves / 5 shots ) Chad Johnson ( 18 saves / 21 shots )

March 4	Western Michigan	1 – 3	Alaska	Lawson Arena	Recap
No Scoring		First period	02:45 - Curtis Fraser
No scoring		Second period	06:49 - pp - Aaron Lee
Paul Szczechura - 19:17		Third period	18:56 - en - Adam Naglich
Riley Gill ( 27 saves / 29 shots )		Goalie stats	Wylie Rogers ( 32 saves / 33 shots )

Alaska won series 2–1

==== (7) Ohio State vs. (10) Northern Michigan ====
March 2	Ohio State	6 – 2	Northern Michigan	OSU Ice Arena	Recap
Sean P. Collins - pp - 15:45		First period	No scoring
John Dingle - pp - 04:06; Mathieu Beaudoin - 07:36		Second period	16:43 - Matt Maunu
Tom Fritsche - 06:27; Tommy Goebel - 10:30; Jason DeSantis - 19:09		Third period	18:19 - Mike Santorelli
Joe Palmer ( 22 saves / 24 shots )		Goalie stats	Bill Zaniboni ( 19 saves / 22 shots ) Brian Stewart ( 18 saves / 21 shots )

March 3	Ohio State	2 – 3	OT	Northern Michigan	OSU Ice Arena	Recap
Kenny Bernard - 09:44		First period		07:21 - pp - Darin Olver; 08:50 - Darin Olver
John Dingle - 07:02		Second period		No scoring
No scoring		Third period		No scoring
No scoring		First overtime period		03:15 - Dusty Collins
Joe Palmer ( 31 saves / 34 shots )		Goalie stats		Brian Stewart ( 42 saves / 44 shots )

March 4	Ohio State	2 – 3	Northern Michigan	OSU Ice Arena	Recap
Tyson Strachan - pp - 13:48		First period	No scoring
No scoring		Second period	06:15 - sh - Zach Tarkir; 14:18 - Nick Sirota
Tyson Strachan - 19:47		Third period	09:59 - sh - Darin Olver
Joe Palmer ( 21 saves / 24 shots )		Goalie stats	Brian Stewart ( 34 saves / 36 shots )

Northern Michigan won series 2–1

==== (8) Lake Superior State vs. (9) Ferris State ====
March 2	Lake Superior State	3 – 4	OT	Ferris State	Taffy Abel Arena	Recap
Trent Campbell - 10:39; Simon Gysbers - 18:46		First period		03:03 - Mark Bomersback
No scoring		Second period		00:39 - Mark Bomersback
Derek Smith - 03:55		Third period		16:29 - Aaron Lewicki
No scoring		First overtime period		12:29 - Mark Bomersback
Jeff Jakaitis ( 30 saves / 34 shots )		Goalie stats		Mitch O'Keefe ( 33 saves / 36 shots )

March 3	Lake Superior State	4 – 3	Ferris State	Taffy Abel Arena	Recap
Dominic Osman - 04:23; Trent Campbell - sh - 12:55		First period	03:57 - Matt Verdone
Simon Gysbers - pp - 14:13		Second period	03:30 - pp - Joe Van Culin; 16:49 - Casey Haines
Dominic Osman - pp - 06:25		Third period	No scoring
Jeff Jakaitis ( 23 saves / 26 shots )		Goalie stats	Mitch O'Keefe ( 28 saves / 32 shots )

March 4	Lake Superior State	3 – 2	Ferris State	Taffy Abel Arena	Recap
Simon Gysbers - pp - 13:34; Derek Smith - pp - 16:55		First period	No scoring
No scoring		Second period	10:36 - Mark Bomersback; 18:12 - Aaron Lewicki
Nik Sellers - 17:51		Third period	No scoring
Jeff Jakaitis ( 31 saves / 33 shots )		Goalie stats	Mitch O'Keefe ( 13 saves / 16 shots )

Lake Superior State won series 2–1

=== Quarterfinals ===
==== (1) Notre Dame vs. (11) Alaska ====
March 9	Notre Dame	7 – 1	Alaska	Joyce Center	Recap
Wes O'Neill - 03:06; Garrett Regan - 06:44; Brock Sheahan - 09:34; Garrett Regan - 14:25; Jason Paige - pp - 15:27		First period	No scoring
Kyle Lawson - 16:14		Second period	No scoring
Mark Van Guilder - pp - 00:58		Third period	04:41 - Nathan Fornataro
David Brown ( 16 saves / 17 shots )		Goalie stats	Wylie Rogers ( 9 saves / 13 shots ) Chad Johnson ( 15 saves / 18 shots )

March 10	Notre Dame	3 – 1	Alaska	Joyce Center	Recap
Ryan Thang - pp - 17:19; Wes O'Neill - pp - 18:42		First period	No scoring
Kevin Deeth - 14:47		Second period	10:20 - pp - Adam Naglich
No scoring		Third period	No scoring
David Brown ( 21 saves / 22 shots )		Goalie stats	Wylie Rogers ( 30 saves / 33 shots )

Notre Dame won series 2–0

==== (2) Michigan vs. (10) Northern Michigan ====
March 9	Michigan	4 – 1	Northern Michigan	Yost Ice Arena	Recap
Matt Hunwick - pp - 08:43; Chris Summers - 17:24; David Rohlfs - 19:13		First period	No scoring
No scoring		Second period	01:20 - Nick Sirota
Andrew Cogliano - en - 19:09		Third period	No scoring
Billy Sauer ( 21 saves / 22 shots )		Goalie stats	Brian Stewart ( 34 saves / 37 shots )

March 10	Michigan	8 – 3	Northern Michigan	Yost Ice Arena	Recap
T. J. Hensick - 03:12; Jack Johnson - 08:21; Andrew Cogliano - 13:59; Kevin Porter - 18:04		First period	12:39 - pp - Pat Bateman
T. J. Hensick - 08:05; Chad Kolarik - pp - 15:10; Andrew Cogliano - 19:37		Second period	02:33 - pp - Mike Santorelli
T. J. Hensick - 14:33		Third period	04:15 - pp - Ray Kaunisto
Billy Sauer ( 14 saves / 17 shots ) Mike Mayhew ( 2 saves / 2 shots )		Goalie stats	Bill Zaniboni ( 9 saves / 14 shots ) Brian Stewart ( 10 saves / 13 shots )

Michigan won series 2–0

==== (3) Miami vs. (8) Lake Superior State ====
March 9	Miami	1 – 2	Lake Superior State	Steve Cady Arena	Recap
No Scoring		First period	No scoring
Kevin Roeder - 18:27		Second period	No scoring
No scoring		Third period	03:22 - Jeffrey Rainville; 09:57 - Derek Smith
Jeff Zatkoff ( 26 saves / 28 shots )		Goalie stats	Jeff Jakaitis ( 37 saves / 38 shots )

March 10	Miami	1 – 2	Lake Superior State	Steve Cady Arena	Recap
No Scoring		First period	11:51 - Jeffrey Rainville
No scoring		Second period	No scoring
Ryan Jones - pp - 14:45		Third period	16:16 - Jeffrey Rainville
Jeff Zatkoff ( 24 saves / 26 shots )		Goalie stats	Jeff Jakaitis ( 44 saves / 45 shots )

Lake Superior State won series 2–0

==== (4) Michigan State vs. (5) Nebraska-Omaha ====
March 9	Michigan State	4 – 2	Nebraska-Omaha	Munn Ice Arena	Recap
No Scoring		First period	No scoring
Jay Sprague - 11:51		Second period	No scoring
Nick Sucharski - pp - 00:54; Jim McKenzie - 19:00; Bryan Lerg - en - 19:29		Third period	15:03 - pp - Dan Knapp; 15:46 - Mick Lawrence
Jeff Lerg ( 23 saves / 25 shots )		Goalie stats	Jerad Kaufmann ( 22 saves / 25 shots )

March 10	Michigan State	4 – 1	Nebraska-Omaha	Munn Ice Arena	Recap
Tim Crowder - 15:06; Tim Kennedy - pp - 16:46		First period	No scoring
No scoring		Second period	07:10 - Alex Nikiforuk
Chris Mueller - pp - 09:13; Jim McKenzie - en - 19:57		Third period	No scoring
Jeff Lerg ( 20 saves / 21 shots )		Goalie stats	Jeremie Dupont ( 34 saves / 37 shots )

Michigan State won series 2–0

=== Semifinals ===
==== (1) Notre Dame vs. (8) Lake Superior State ====
March 16	Notre Dame	3 – 0	Lake Superior State	Joe Louis Arena	Recap
Wes O'Neill - pp - 09:46		First period	No scoring
Brock Sheahan - 08:46		Second period	No scoring
Christian Hanson - en - 17:33		Third period	No scoring
David Brown ( 17 saves / 17 shots )		Goalie stats	Jeff Jakaitis ( 26 saves / 28 shots )

==== (2) Michigan vs. (4) Michigan State ====
March 16	Michigan	4 – 1	Michigan State	Joe Louis Arena	Recap
Chris Summers - 03:07; Kevin Porter - 04:11; Kevin Porter - 15:47		First period	No scoring
No scoring		Second period	No scoring
Chad Kolarik - 14:27; T. J. Hensick - en - 19:52		Third period	13:37 - Jim McKenzie; 16:04 - Tim Kennedy
Billy Sauer ( 18 saves / 20 shots )		Goalie stats	Jeff Lerg ( 16 saves / 20 shots )

=== Third place ===
==== (4) Michigan State vs. (8) Lake Superior State ====
March 17	Michigan State	7 – 6	OT	Lake Superior State	Joe Louis Arena	Recap
Bryan Lerg - 07:30; Daniel Vukovic - 11:23; Jim McKenzie - pp - 12:44		First period		14:32 - Steven Oleksy
Daniel Vukovic - 09:22		Second period		08:41 - Nathan Perkovich; 13:16 - pp - Nathan Perkovich
Chris Mueller - 05:25; Matt Schepke - 14:20		Third period		07:56 - Steven Oleksy; 18:54 - pp - Nathan Perkovich; 19:40 - Trent Campbell
Tyler Howells - pp - 03:37		First overtime period		No scoring
Jeff Lerg ( 40 saves / 46 shots )		Goalie stats		Jeff Jakaitis ( 29 saves / 36 shots )

=== Championship ===
==== (1) Notre Dame vs. (2) Michigan ====
March 17	Notre Dame	2 – 1	Michigan	Joe Louis Arena	Recap
No Scoring		First period	19:54 - Kevin Porter
Erik Condra - 15:58		Second period	No scoring
Jason Paige - 08:52		Third period	No scoring
David Brown ( 31 saves / 32 shots )		Goalie stats	Billy Sauer ( 35 saves / 37 shots )

== Tournament awards ==
=== All-Tournament Team ===
- F Kevin Porter (Michigan)
- F T. J. Hensick (Michigan)
- F Erik Condra (Notre Dame)
- D Wes O'Neill (Notre Dame)
- D Jack Johnson (Michigan)
- G David Brown* (Notre Dame)

* Most Valuable Player(s)
