= List of Senior CLASS Award ice hockey winners =

Senior CLASS Award for ice hockey
- Awarded for: the outstanding senior NCAA Division I Student-Athlete of the Year in men's ice hockey
- Country: United States
- First award: 2007
- Currently held by: Zach Driscoll
- Website: http://www.seniorclassaward.com/hockey/

The Senior CLASS Award is presented each year to the outstanding senior NCAA Division I Student-Athlete of the Year in men's ice hockey. The award was established in 2007.

So far, no women's version of this award has been created. Three NCAA sports that are sponsored for both men and women have Senior CLASS Awards for only one sex—ice hockey and lacrosse do not have women's awards, and volleyball does not have a men's award.

== Recipients ==
Year	Winner	School
2007	David Brown	Notre Dame
2008	Landis Stankievech	Princeton
2009	Jeff Lerg	Michigan State
2010	Colin Greening	Cornell
2011	Jacques Lamoureux	Air Force
2012	Jack Connolly	Minnesota–Duluth
2013	Cheyne Rocha	Army
2014	Brock Higgs	Rensselaer
2015	Spiro Goulakos	Colgate
2016	David Glen	Penn State
2017	Brendan Harms	Bemidji State
2018	Jake Evans	Notre Dame
2019	Kyle Haak	Air Force
2020	Nolan Nicholas	Alaska Anchorage
2021	Jordan Kawaguchi	North Dakota
2022	Zach Driscoll	North Dakota
