= Kevin Porter (ice hockey) =

American ice hockey player (born 1986)

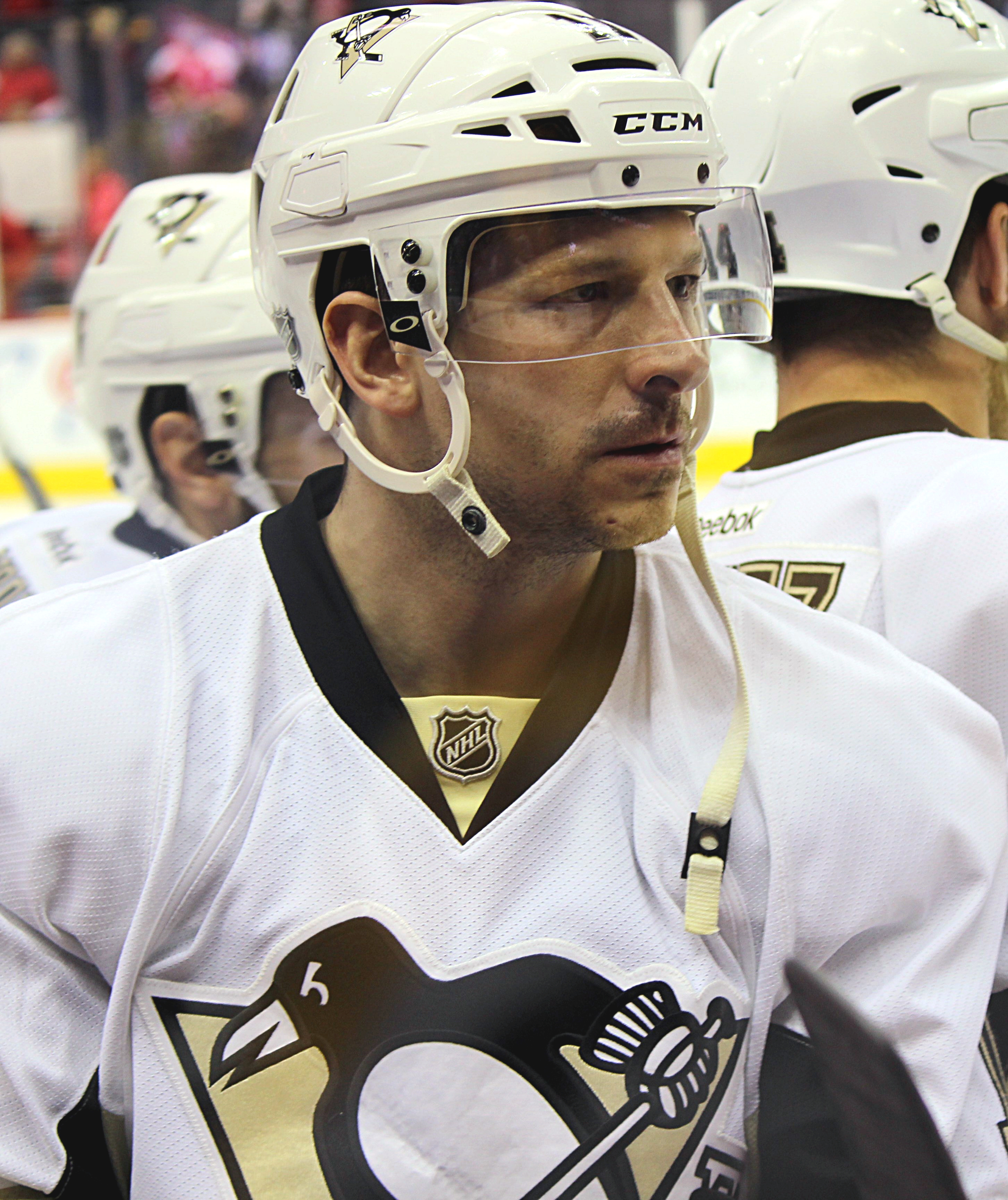
- Porter with the Pittsburgh Penguins in 2016
- Born: March 12, 1986 (age 40) Northville, Michigan, U.S.
- Height: 6 ft 0 in (183 cm)
- Weight: 195 lb (88 kg; 13 st 13 lb)
- Position: Center
- Shot: Left
- Played for: Phoenix Coyotes; Colorado Avalanche; Buffalo Sabres; Pittsburgh Penguins
- NHL draft: 119th overall, 2004; Phoenix Coyotes
- Playing career: 2008–2020

Kevin M. Porter (born March 12, 1986) is an American former professional National Hockey League (NHL) center.

== Playing career ==
=== Amateur ===
As a youth, Porter played in the 2000 Quebec International Pee-Wee Hockey Tournament with a minor ice hockey team from Michigan.

Porter was drafted in the 2004 NHL entry draft by the Phoenix Coyotes in the fourth round, 119th overall. Drafted after two seasons selected to the USA Hockey National Team Development Program in Ann Arbor, Michigan as a skilled undersized scorer, Porter was then recruited to the University of Michigan hockey program in the Central Collegiate Hockey Association.

In his 2004–05 freshman season with the Wolverines, Porter scored 11 goals in 39 games to finish with 24 points, second among Wolverine rookies to fellow USNTDP product and Coyotes draft pick, Chad Kolarik. Establishing his scoring touch as a sophomore with 38 points in 39 games, Kevin returned as a junior to lead the Wolverines with 24 goals and place second among points with 58 to earn player of the Month award (November) and nomination to the CCHA Second All-Star Team.

With the departure of prolific Michigan scorer T. J. Hensick, Porter returned to captain the Wolverines for his senior year in 2007–08. For the fourth consecutive season Porter improved his season totals posting 33 goals and 63 points in 43 games to lead the U of M and place second only to Nathan Gerbe in the NCAA. He set an NCAA Tournament record with four goals in the East Regional Semi-Final against Niagara, as he captained the Wolverines to the Frozen four for the first time since 2003. Named as the University of Michigan Male sports person of the Year, Porter's standout season was also awarded with selection to the CCHA First All-Star Team, CCHA Player of the Year and the NCAA West First All-American Team to culminate in winning the Hobey Baker Award as the top collegiate player in the NCAA.

=== Professional ===
Shortly after completing his collegiate career, on April 14, 2008, Porter signed a three-year entry-level contract with the Coyotes. He then joined the Coyotes affiliate, the San Antonio Rampage of the American Hockey League, for their first-round play-off run.

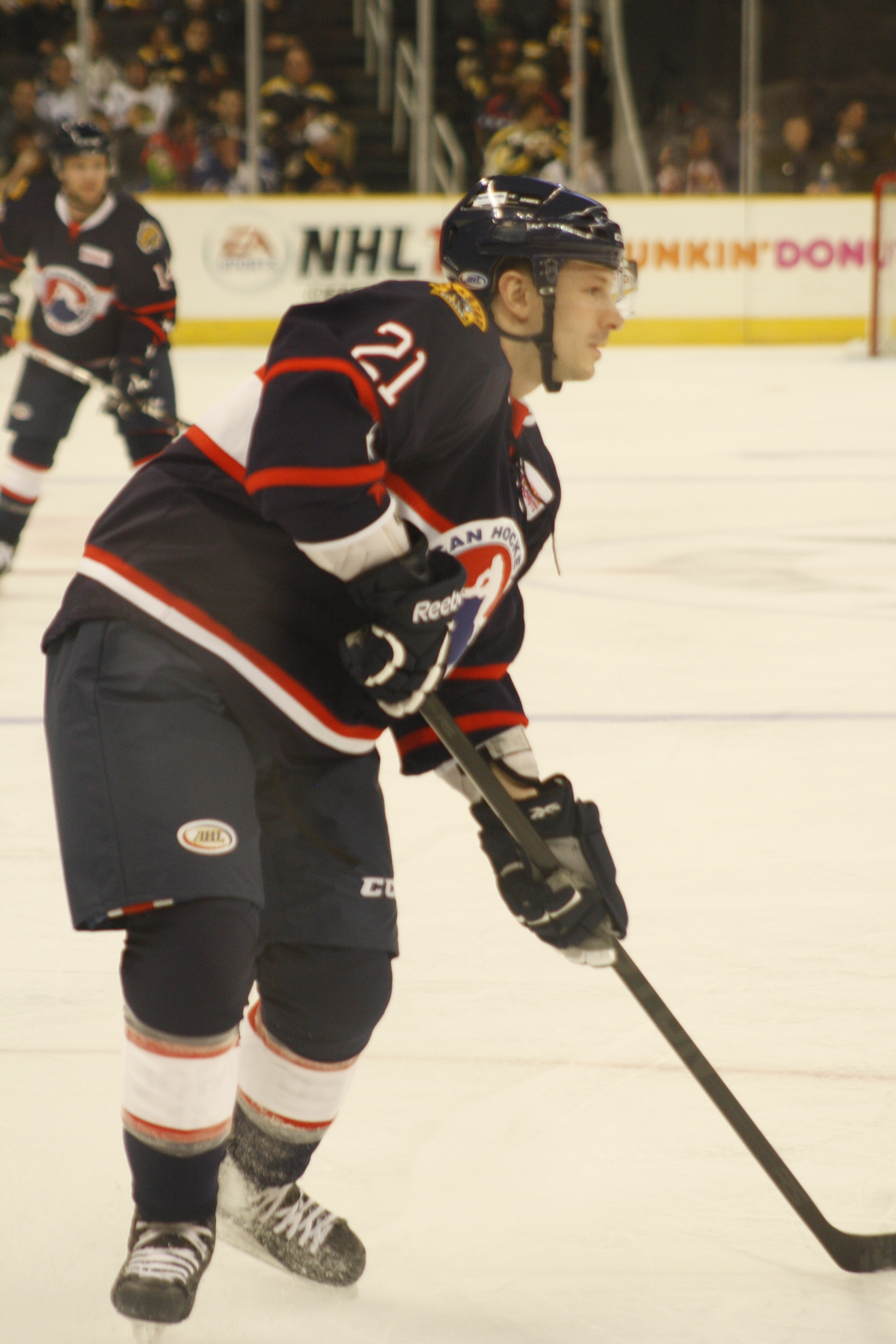
Porter at the 2013 AHL All-Star Game.

In the 2008–09 season, Porter made the Coyotes opening season roster and made his NHL debut in a 3–1 win against the Columbus Blue Jackets on October 11, 2008, picking up an assist, his first NHL point. Porter scored his first career NHL goal on October 30, 2008, in a 4–1 victory over the Pittsburgh Penguins. At the turn of the year with a reduced role offensively, Porter was assigned by the Coyotes to the AHL for the majority of the remaining season and developed a scoring touch to lead the Rampage in Plus/minus (+7). He finished his first professional season with 5 goals for 10 points in 34 games with the Coyotes.

Porter was assigned to the Rampage to start the 2009–10 season. He was recalled by the Coyotes on numerous occasions but was limited to just 4 games. On March 3, 2010, while with the Rampage, Porter was traded by the Coyotes, along with Peter Mueller, to the Colorado Avalanche for forward Wojtek Wolski. After skating in four games with Avalanche affiliate, the Lake Erie Monsters, Porter received his first recall to Colorado on March 11, 2010, where he made his Avalanche debut in a 3–0 victory over the Florida Panthers. Used in a checking line role, Porter scored his first goal in his 8th game with the Avalanche against his former team, the Coyotes, in a 6–2 loss on March 28, 2010. He finished the season making his NHL post season debut in four games against the San Jose Sharks before re-signing with the Avalanche as a restricted free agent to a one-year contract on June 17, 2010.

In the 2011–12 season on December 9, 2011, Porter was suspended for 4 games for a knee on knee hit with Vancouver Canucks forward David Booth.

On July 5, 2012, Porter signed as a free agent to a two-year contract with the Buffalo Sabres. With the 2012 NHL lockout in effect, Porter was assigned directly to affiliate, the Rochester Americans, and selected as team Captain. During the 2012–13 season, Porter was leading the Americans in points when he was recalled by the Sabres on February 20, 2013.

On July 1, 2014, the Detroit Red Wings signed Porter to a one-year, two-way contract. During the 2014–15 season, Porter recorded 16 goals and 23 assists in 76 games for the Grand Rapids Griffins.

Porter familiarly became a free agent after his season with the Red Wings and on July 1, 2015, the Pittsburgh Penguins signed Porter to a one-year, two-way contract. In his first season with the Penguins, Porter made the opening night roster for the 2015–16 season. Playing on the fourth line and in a penalty-killing role, Porter appeared in 41 games for 3 assists, before his season ended on March 3, 2016, in suffering a broken ankle. With the Penguins going on to claim the Championship, Porter met the exact minimum games requirement for his name to appear on the Stanley Cup. On June 20, 2016, he was re-signed to a one-year contract extension with the Penguins.

On July 1, 2017, Porter left the Penguins organization after two seasons to sign a free agent contract on a two-year, two-way deal to return to former club, the Buffalo Sabres. Re-assigned to add a veteran presence in his second stint with the Rochester Americans, Porter captained the team in each season under contract with the Sabres.

On June 13, 2019, as an impending free agent from the Sabres, Porter opted to continue with the Rochester Americans, signing a one-year AHL contract for the 2019–20 season.

== International play ==
Medal record

Representing United States

Ice hockey

World U18 Championships
Silver medal – second place	2004 Minsk	

A product of the USNTDP system, Porter made his international debut with the United States as a young 17-year-old in the 2003 World Under 18 Championships in Yaroslavl, Russia. After posting 2 points in 6 games to finish out of the medals, in fourth place, Kevin returned in his final year with the Development Program to play in the succeeding 2004 World Under 18 Championships in Minsk, Belarus. In a prominent senior role, Kevin scored 2 goals and 6 assists to place second on the team with 8 points as USA went on to claim the Silver medal, losing 3–2 to Russia in the final on April 18, 2004.

During a successful freshman year with the University of Michigan, Porter was added to the Team USA side hosting the 2005 World Junior Championships in Grand Forks, North Dakota. Porter amassed 3 goals and 5 points in 7 games. He scored in the Bronze medal game against the Czech Republic, however again missed the medals and finished fourth. Porter was selected to his fourth junior tournament as a sophomore with Team USA at the 2006 World Junior Championships in Vancouver, Canada. As captain of the United States squad, he led the team to a second consecutive fourth-place finish, compiling 6 points in 7 games to be named as Team USA's best forward by his teammates.

== Coaching career ==
On October 21, 2020, Porter was named to the USA Hockey National Team Development Program coaching staff. He was later added as an assistant coach to J.D. Forrest with the Wilkes-Barre/Scranton Penguins of the AHL on January 11, 2021.

== Career statistics ==
=== Regular season and playoffs ===
			Regular season					Playoffs
Season	Team	League	GP	G	A	Pts	PIM	GP	G	A	Pts	PIM
2002–03	U.S. NTDP U17	USDP	19	9	11	20	8	—	—	—	—	—
2002–03	U.S. NTDP U18	USDP	13	1	2	3	2	—	—	—	—	—
2002–03	U.S. NTDP U18	NAHL	40	19	9	28	17	—	—	—	—	—
2003–04	U.S. NTDP U18	NAHL	11	3	8	11	4	—	—	—	—	—
2003–04	U.S. NTDP U18	USDP	44	5	21	26	26	—	—	—	—	—
2004–05	University of Michigan	CCHA	39	11	13	24	51	—	—	—	—	—
2005–06	University of Michigan	CCHA	39	17	21	38	30	—	—	—	—	—
2006–07	University of Michigan	CCHA	41	24	34	58	16	—	—	—	—	—
2007–08	University of Michigan	CCHA	43	33	30	63	18	—	—	—	—	—
2007–08	San Antonio Rampage	AHL	—	—	—	—	—	7	0	4	4	0
2008–09	Phoenix Coyotes	NHL	34	5	5	10	4	—	—	—	—	—
2008–09	San Antonio Rampage	AHL	42	13	22	35	14	—	—	—	—	—
2009–10	San Antonio Rampage	AHL	52	15	25	40	31	—	—	—	—	—
2009–10	Phoenix Coyotes	NHL	4	0	0	0	0	—	—	—	—	—
2009–10	Lake Erie Monsters	AHL	4	1	0	1	2	—	—	—	—	—
2009–10	Colorado Avalanche	NHL	16	2	1	3	0	4	0	0	0	0
2010–11	Colorado Avalanche	NHL	74	14	11	25	27	—	—	—	—	—
2011–12	Colorado Avalanche	NHL	35	4	3	7	17	—	—	—	—	—
2012–13	Rochester Americans	AHL	48	15	29	44	38	—	—	—	—	—
2012–13	Buffalo Sabres	NHL	31	4	5	9	10	—	—	—	—	—
2013–14	Buffalo Sabres	NHL	12	0	1	1	2	—	—	—	—	—
2013–14	Rochester Americans	AHL	50	19	17	36	24	5	0	3	3	0
2014–15	Grand Rapids Griffins	AHL	76	16	23	39	25	16	1	3	4	14
2015–16	Pittsburgh Penguins	NHL	41	0	3	3	0	—	—	—	—	—
2015–16	Wilkes–Barre/Scranton Penguins	AHL	16	5	4	9	4	—	—	—	—	—
2016–17	Wilkes–Barre/Scranton Penguins	AHL	69	11	35	46	50	5	0	6	6	2
2016–17	Pittsburgh Penguins	NHL	2	0	0	0	0	—	—	—	—	—
2017–18	Rochester Americans	AHL	66	17	25	42	20	3	1	4	5	0
2018–19	Rochester Americans	AHL	58	10	29	39	37	3	1	1	2	7
2019–20	Rochester Americans	AHL	47	7	16	23	30	—	—	—	—	—
AHL totals			528	129	255	354	275	39	3	21	24	23
NHL totals			249	29	29	58	60	4	0	0	0	0

=== International ===
Year	Team	Event	Result	GP	G	A	Pts	PIM
2003	United States	WJC18	4th	6	0	2	2	30
2004	United States	WJC18	2nd place, silver medalist(s)	6	2	6	8	4
2005	United States	WJC	4th	7	3	2	5	6
2006	United States	WJC	4th	7	2	4	6	2
Junior totals				26	7	14	21	42

== Awards and honors ==
Award	Year
College
All-CCHA Second Team	2006–07
CCHA All-Tournament Team	2007
All-CCHA First Team	2007–08
All-CCHA Player of the Year	2007–08
AHCA West First-Team All-American	2007–08
Hobey Baker Award	2007–08
AHL
All-Star Game	2013
NHL
Stanley Cup champion	2016

Awards and achievements
Preceded by Ryan Duncan	Winner of the Hobey Baker Award; 2007–08	Succeeded by Matt Gilroy
Preceded by David Brown	CCHA Player of the Year; 2007–08	Succeeded by Chad Johnson
Preceded by Jeff Lerg	Perani Cup Champion; 2007–08	Succeeded by Chad Johnson
