= Perani Cup =

Award given by the Central Collegiate Hockey Association

- Sport: Ice hockey
- Awarded for: the player on each team who receives the most three stars of the game honors in CCHA play

History
- First award: 2003
- Final award: 2013
- Most recent: Brady Hjelle

The Perani Cup was an annual award given out at the conclusion of the Central Collegiate Hockey Association regular season to the player who finished with the most 'stars-of-the-game' points in CCHA play. While each school named a Perani Cup Champion, the official CCHA winner was the player who had the highest point total amongst all conference teams. points were calculated as 5 for a number one star, 3 for a number two star, and 1 for a number three star. Any player on the game roster was eligible to be star and only games between CCHA opponents would be counted towards the Perani Cup Standings. The three stars for each game are nominally selected by members of the home-team press.

The Perani Cup was first bestowed in 2003 and every year thereafter until 2013 when the CCHA was dissolved as a consequence of the Big Ten forming its men's ice hockey conference.

== Award winners ==
Year	Winner	Position	School
2002–03	Mike Brown	Goaltender	Ferris State
2003–04	Craig Kowalski	Goaltender	Northern Michigan
2004–05	Jordan Sigalet	Goaltender	Bowling Green
2005–06	Jeff Jakaitis	Goaltender	Lake Superior State
2006–07	Jeff Lerg	Goaltender	Michigan State
2007–08	Kevin Porter	Center	Michigan
2008–09	Chad Johnson	Goaltender	Alaska
2009–10	Drew Palmisano	Goaltender	Michigan State
2010–11	Andy Miele	Center	Miami
2011–12	Reilly Smith	Right wing	Miami
2012–13	Brady Hjelle	Goaltender	Ohio State

=== Winners by school ===
School	Winners
Miami	2
Michigan State	2
Alaska	1
Bowling Green	1
Ferris State	1
Lake Superior State	1
Michigan	1
Northern Michigan	1
Ohio State	1

=== Winners by position ===
Position	Winners
Center	2
Right wing	1
Goaltender	8

== See also ==
- CCHA Awards
