= Brady Hjelle =

American ice hockey player (born 1990)

- Born: May 3, 1990 (age 36) International Falls, Minnesota
- Height: 5 ft 11 in (180 cm)
- Weight: 185 lb (84 kg; 13 st 3 lb)
- Position: Goaltender
- Caught: Left
- Played for: Florida Everblades; Rosenborg IHK; Tulsa Oilers; Manglerud Star; Stjernen Hockey
- NHL draft: Undrafted
- Playing career: 2011–2016
Medal record
Ice hockey
Representing United States
World Junior A Challenge
Bronze medal – third place	2007 Trail

Brady Hjelle (born May 3, 1990) is an American former professional ice hockey goaltender.

Hjelle played college hockey with the Ohio State Buckeyes in the NCAA Men's Division I CCHA conference. In his senior year, Hjelle's outstanding play was rewarded with a selection to the 2012–13 CCHA All-Conference First Team. Hjelle made his professional debut in the playoffs of the 2012–13 season with the Florida Everblades.

On May 18, 2013, Hjelle signed a contract with Norwegian-based club, Rosenborg IHK of the GET-ligaen.

After the 2013–14 season, Hjelle signed a tryout contract with Tappara of the Liiga in Finland. However, on August 20, 2014, the team announced that Hjelle had been cut. Remaining in Scandinavia, he moved to Norwegian GET-ligaen in signing for Rosenborg IHK.

On September 10, 2014, Hjelle signalled his return to North America, in signing a one-year contract as a free agent with the Tulsa Oilers of the CHL.

== Awards and honors ==
Award	Year
All-CCHA First Team	2012–13
AHCA West First-Team All-American	2012–13

Awards and achievements
Preceded by Connor Knapp	CCHA Best Goaltender; 2012–13	Succeeded by Award Discontinued
Preceded by Reilly Smith	Perani Cup Champion; 2012–13	Succeeded by Award Discontinued
