= 2004–05 USHL season =

- League: United States Hockey League
- Sport: Ice hockey
- Duration: September 24, 2004 – May 9, 2005
- Games: 60
- Teams: 11

Anderson Cup Champions
- Season champions: Cedar Rapids RoughRiders; Omaha Lancers

Clark Cup Champions
- Champions: Cedar Rapids RoughRiders

USHL seasons
- 2003–04 2005–06

The 2004–05 USHL season is the 26th season of the United States Hockey League as an all-junior league. The regular season began on September 24, 2004, and concluded on April 2, 2005, with the regular season champion winning the Anderson Cup. The 2004–05 season was the first for the Indiana Ice who moved from Danville, Illinois, after their first season in the USHL. Two years after being named the River City Lancers, the franchise in Omaha, Nebraska, returned to their original name of Omaha Lancers.

The Clark Cup playoffs features the top four teams from each division competing for the league title.

== Regular season ==
Final standings

Note: GP = Games played; W = Wins; L = Losses; OTL = Overtime losses; SL = Shootout losses; GF = Goals for; GA = Goals against; PTS = Points; x = clinched playoff berth; y = clinched division title; z = clinched league title

=== East Division ===
Team	GP	W	L	OTL	PTS	GF	GA
zCedar Rapids RoughRiders	60	42	13	5	89	229	157
xWaterloo Black Hawks	60	29	25	6	64	163	168
xChicago Steel	60	26	29	5	57	165	187
xIndiana Ice	60	20	33	7	47	169	209
Green Bay Gamblers	60	21	37	2	44	141	220
Des Moines Buccaneers	60	17	37	6	40	174	244

=== West Division ===
Team	GP	W	L	OTL	PTS	GF	GA
zOmaha Lancers	60	41	12	7	89	215	148
xSioux City Musketeers	60	37	17	6	80	222	173
xLincoln Stars	60	37	17	6	80	217	184
xTri-City Storm	60	33	21	6	72	189	172
Sioux Falls Stampede	60	27	28	5	59	178	200

== Clark Cup playoffs ==
Quarter-finals
1	Cedar Rapids	7	6	5	–	–
4	Indiana Ice	3	2	4	–	–
East Division
2	Waterloo	5	1	0	3	3
3	Chicago	1	0	7	6	2
1	Omaha	1	6	2	3	0
4	Tri-City	5	2	6	0	1
West Division
2	Sioux City	7	5	1	7	–
3	Lincoln	4	2	9	5	–

Semi-finals
1	Cedar Rapids	2	2	4	–	–
2	Chicago	1	1	2	–	–
4	Tri-City	0	4	1	2	–
2	Sioux City	6	3	4	3	–

Clark Cup Championship
E	Cedar Rapids	5	1	4	1	4
W	Sioux City	0	2	3	2	1

== Players ==
=== Scoring leaders ===
	Player	Team	GP	G	A	Pts	+/-	PIM
1	Dan Riedel	Lincoln Stars	60	30	51	81	+4	74
2	Chad Rau	Des Moines Buccaneers	57	31	40	71	-10	32
3	Trevor Smith	Omaha Lancers	60	29	39	68	+18	78
4	Teddy Purcell	Cedar Rapids RoughRiders	58	20	47	67	+20	22
5	Cory Carlson	Omaha Lancers	60	25	41	66	+9	78
6	Tim Kennedy	Sioux City Musketeers	54	30	31	61	+26	112
	Brian Bales	Sioux City Musketeers	54	20	41	61	+31	16
8	Erik Condra	Lincoln Stars	60	30	30	60	+5	56
	Rob Ricci	Cedar Rapids RoughRiders	59	26	34	60	+20	38
10	Sean Muncy	Waterloo Black Hawks	60	26	33	59	-5	26

=== Leading goaltenders ===
	Player	Team	GP	MIN	W	L	OTL	SO	GA	GAA	SV	SV%
1	Jeff Lerg	Omaha Lancers	52	3105	36	11	4	6	112	2.16	1229	.916
2	Dan Tormey	Cedar Rapids RoughRiders	32	1839	23	4	2	3	69	2.25	869	.926
3	Drew O'Connell	Waterloo Black Hawks	37	1946	15	12	4	5	82	2.53	791	.906
4	Steve Jakiel	Lincoln Stars	26	1434	15	7	2	0	61	2.55	668	.916
	Jeff Zatkoff	Sioux City Musketeers	24	1271	13	6	3	1	54	2.55	575	.914

== Awards ==
- Coach of the Year: Mark Carlson Cedar Rapids RoughRiders
- Curt Hammer Award: Christian Hanson Tri-City Storm
- Defenseman of the Year: Brett Motherwell Omaha Lancers
- Forward of the Year: Dan Riedel Lincoln Stars
- General Manager of the Year: Mike Hastings Omaha Lancers
- Goaltender of the Year: Jeff Lerg Omaha Lancers
- Organization of the Year: Waterloo Black Hawks
- Player of the Year: Jeff Lerg Omaha Lancers
- Rookie of the Year: Chad Rau Des Moines Buccaneers
