= CCHA Goaltender of the Year =

- Sport: Ice hockey
- Awarded for: Best Goaltender in the CCHA

History
- First award: 2001
- First winner: Ryan Miller
- Most wins: Ryan Miller (2)
- Most recent: Joe Kosai

The CCHA Goaltender of the Year is an annual award given out at the conclusion of the Central Collegiate Hockey Association (CCHA) regular season to the best goaltender in the conference as voted by the coaches of each CCHA team.

It was first presented in 2001, and continued to be presented every year thereafter until 2013 when the original CCHA was dissolved as a consequence of the Big Ten Conference forming its men's ice hockey conference. The award was revived along with the league starting in the 2021–22 season.

The award was known as the "Best Goaltender" from 2005 to 2013.

Only one player (Ryan Miller) received the award more than once, winning Goaltender of the Year in the first two years it was conferred.

== Award winners ==
Year	Winner	School
2000–01	Ryan Miller	Michigan State
2001–02	Ryan Miller	Michigan State
2002–03	Mike Betz	Ohio State
2003–04	Dominic Vicari	Michigan State
2004–05	Tuomas Tarkki	Northern Michigan
2005–06	Charlie Effinger	Miami
2006–07	David Brown	Notre Dame
2007–08	Jeff Zatkoff	Miami
2008–09	Chad Johnson	Alaska
2009–10	Cody Reichard	Miami
2010–11	Shawn Hunwick	Michigan
2011–12	Connor Knapp	Miami
2012–13	Brady Hjelle	Ohio State
2021–22	Dryden McKay	Minnesota State
2022–23	Blake Pietila	Michigan Tech
2023–24	Mattias Sholl	Bemidji State
2024–25	Alex Tracy	Minnesota State
2025–26	Josh Kotai	Augustana

=== Winners by school ===
==== Current teams ====
School	Winners
Minnesota State	2
Augustana	1
Bemidji State	1
Michigan Tech	1
Northern Michigan	1

==== Former teams ====
School	Winners
Miami	4
Michigan State	3
Ohio State	2
Alaska	1
Michigan	1
Northern Michigan	1
Notre Dame	1

== See also ==
- CCHA Awards
