= Rob Ricci =

Canadian ice hockey player

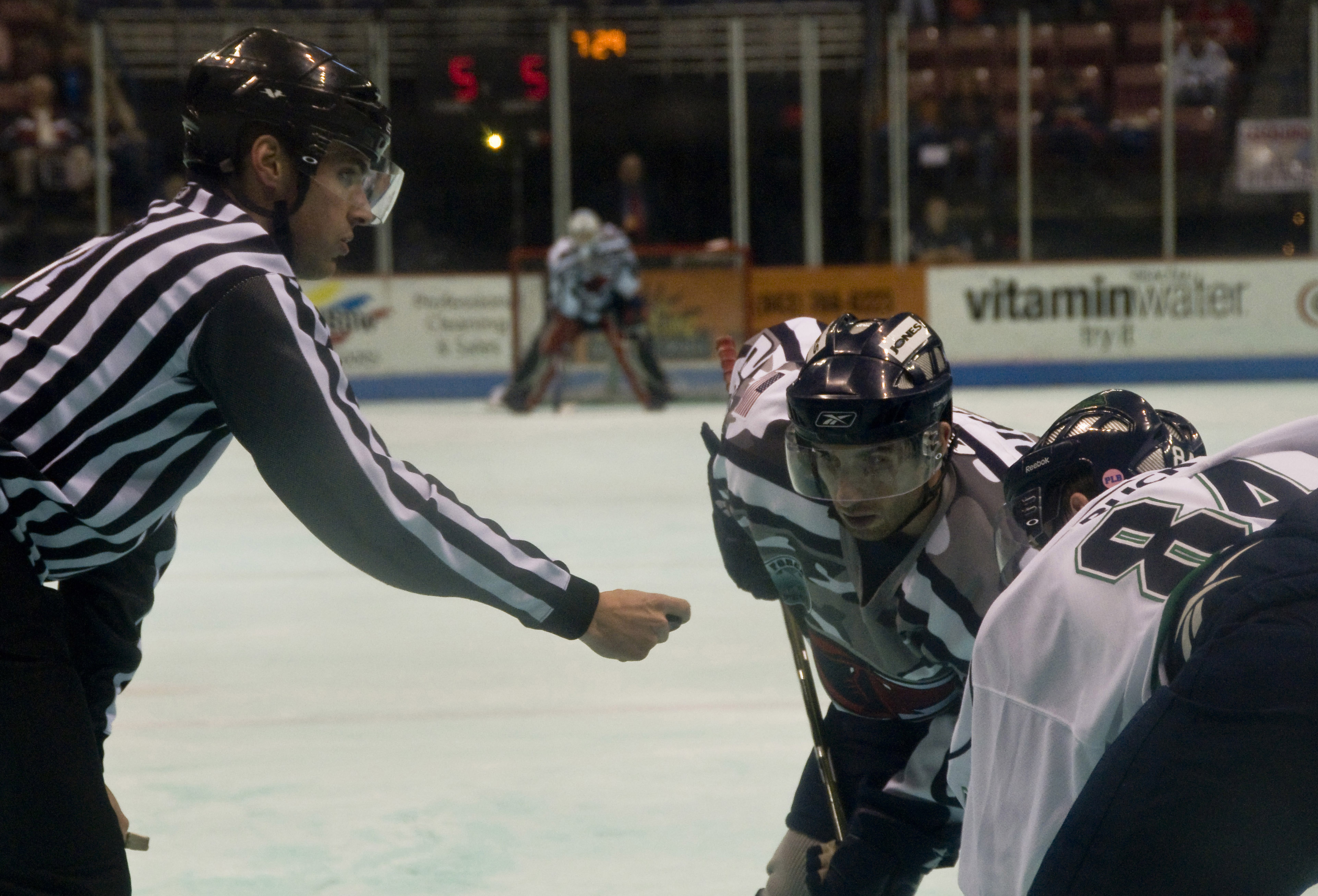
- Born: December 12, 1984 (age 41) Brampton, Ontario, Canada
- Height: 5 ft 9 in (175 cm)
- Weight: 165 lb (75 kg; 11 st 11 lb)
- Position: Forward
- Shoots: Left
- team Former teams: Free Agent; Peoria Rivermen; Odense Bulldogs; Mora IK; Herning Blue Fox; Dundee Stars
- NHL draft: Undrafted
- Playing career: 2009–present

Rob Ricci (born December 12, 1984) is a Canadian retired professional ice hockey forward who most recently played for the South Carolina Stingrays of the ECHL.

== Playing career ==
Ricci started his junior career with the Georgetown Raiders of the Ontario Provincial A Junior Hockey League, playing one game in the 2001–02 season with no points or penalty minutes. For the 2002–03 season, Ricci moved to the Milton Merchants (also of the OPJHL), where he put up an impressive 76 points in combined goals and assists and 10 penalty minutes over 49 games.

Ricci skated with the Cedar Rapids RoughRiders of the United States Hockey League from 2003 to 2005, earning 99 points in regular season play and 8 points in the post-season. Ricci finished the 2004–05 season with a plus/minus of +20. The RoughRiders won both the regular season points championship (Anderson Cup) and the post-season Clark Cup that year.

From 2005 to 2009, Ricci attended Merrimack College, where he played all but his sophomore year due to an "unspecified violation of team rules and school policy." Ricci led the Warriors in scoring during his freshman year, and in points (34), assists (21), and power play goals (6) his junior season. He served as assistant captain his junior year and was named a co-captain for his senior season. Ricci was named team MVP for all three seasons he played at Merrimack.

At the end of the 2008–09 season, Ricci signed with the Las Vegas Wranglers of the ECHL and launched his pro career. He played 4 regular season games with the Wranglers in which he earned 2 assists and 4 penalty minutes. Ricci moved to the South Carolina Stingrays for the post-season, scoring one goal in what became a league-record third successful run for the Kelly Cup.

Ricci returned to the Stingrays for the 2009–10 season, earning 50 points in combined goals (25) and assists (25) in regular season play, as well as scoring one goal in the Stingrays' first-round playoff elimination. Ricci earned his first professional hat trick against the Cincinnati Cyclones in March of that year.

Ricci re-signed with the Stingrays for the 2010–11 season. Ricci tallied his second professional hat trick against the Gwinnett Gladiators in a 4–1 victory in January 2011.

In July 2011, Ricci signed with the Odense Bulldogs of Denmark's AL-Bank Ligaen. He had a successful season with the team, scoring 44 points in 37 regular season games and 19 points in 15 playoff games, as Odense finished as runners-up of the 2011–12 season. His efforts earned him a spot on the Danish League All Star Team and in March of that season he was named the league's player of the month. For the 2012–13 season, Ricci began the season playing with Mora IK in Allsvenskan, the Tier 2 league in Sweden. However, after playing 8 games with the team and 2 games with its J20 squad, Ricci returned to Denmark and spent the rest of the season with the Herning Blue Fox where he chipped in 15 goals and 25 assist, for 40 points, in 28 games. For the 2013–14 season, Ricci completed another tour with the Bulldogs, contributing 28 points in 40 games. The 2014–15 season will bring Ricci to Glasgow, Scotland, on a one-year contract with the Dundee Stars of the EIHL. After 15 games, Ricci felt uneasy about continuing and left Dundee. Once the ECHL's Brampton Beast invited him, the prospect of being a part of his hometown team, "playing at home in front of my family and my friends was something that I thought I’d enjoyed.” After a struggling beginning, with just 4 goals in 24 games, Ricci was considering retirement. Once the Stingrays, now coached by a former teammate of Ricci's, Spencer Carbery, offered to bring Ricci to their squad, Ricci felt he should give a chance to his first professional team and an old friend. The Stingrays traded defensemen Guy Leboeuf for Ricci, who helped the team reach a record winning streak of 18 games.

== Personal life ==
Ricci is married since 2013 to Danielle.

== Career statistics ==
			Regular season					Playoffs
Season	Team	League	GP	G	A	Pts	PIM	GP	G	A	Pts	PIM
2001–02	Georgetown Raiders	OPJHL	1	0	0	0	0	—	—	—	—	—
2002–03	Milton Merchants	OPJHL	49	29	47	76	10	—	—	—	—	—
2003–04	Cedar Rapids RoughRiders	USHL	60	17	22	39	22	4	1	1	2	2
2004–05	Cedar Rapids RoughRiders	USHL	59	26	34	60	38	11	3	3	6	2
2005–06	Merrimack College	HE	34	10	16	26	59	—	—	—	—	—
2007–08	Merrimack College	HE	34	13	21	34	26	—	—	—	—	—
2008–09	Merrimack College	HE	31	11	12	23	20	—	—	—	—	—
2008–09	Las Vegas Wranglers	ECHL	4	0	2	2	4	—	—	—	—	—
2008–09	South Carolina Stingrays	ECHL	—	—	—	—	—	7	1	0	1	0
2009–10	South Carolina Stingrays	ECHL	72	25	25	50	18	4	1	0	1	0
2010–11	South Carolina Stingrays	ECHL	67	26	28	54	32	4	1	1	2	4
2010–11	Peoria Rivermen	AHL	5	0	0	0	0	—	—	—	—	—
2010–12	Odense Bulldogs	DEN	37	22	22	44	36	15	10	9	19	12
2012–13	Herning Blue Fox	DEN	28	15	25	40	2	6	1	4	5	0
2012–13	Mora IK	Allsv	8	2	0	2	2	—	—	—	—	—
2013–14	Odense Bulldogs	DEN	40	9	19	28	31	5	3	2	5	27
2014–15	Dundee Stars	EIHL	15	6	4	10	8	—	—	—	—	—
2014–15	Brampton Beast	ECHL	24	4	10	14	10	—	—	—	—	—
2014–15	South Carolina Stingrays	ECHL	33	11	8	19	12	11	1	2	3	2
ECHL totals			200	66	73	139	76	26	4	3	7	6

== Awards and honors ==
Award	Year
Regular season MVP, Merrimack College	2005–06, 2007–08, 2008–09
All-Hockey East Rookie Team	2005–06
Kelly Cup Champion	2009
Sher-Wood Hockey ECHL Player of the Week (January 3–9)	2011
Danish League All-Star Team	2010–12
