= Wes O'Neill =

Canadian ice hockey player

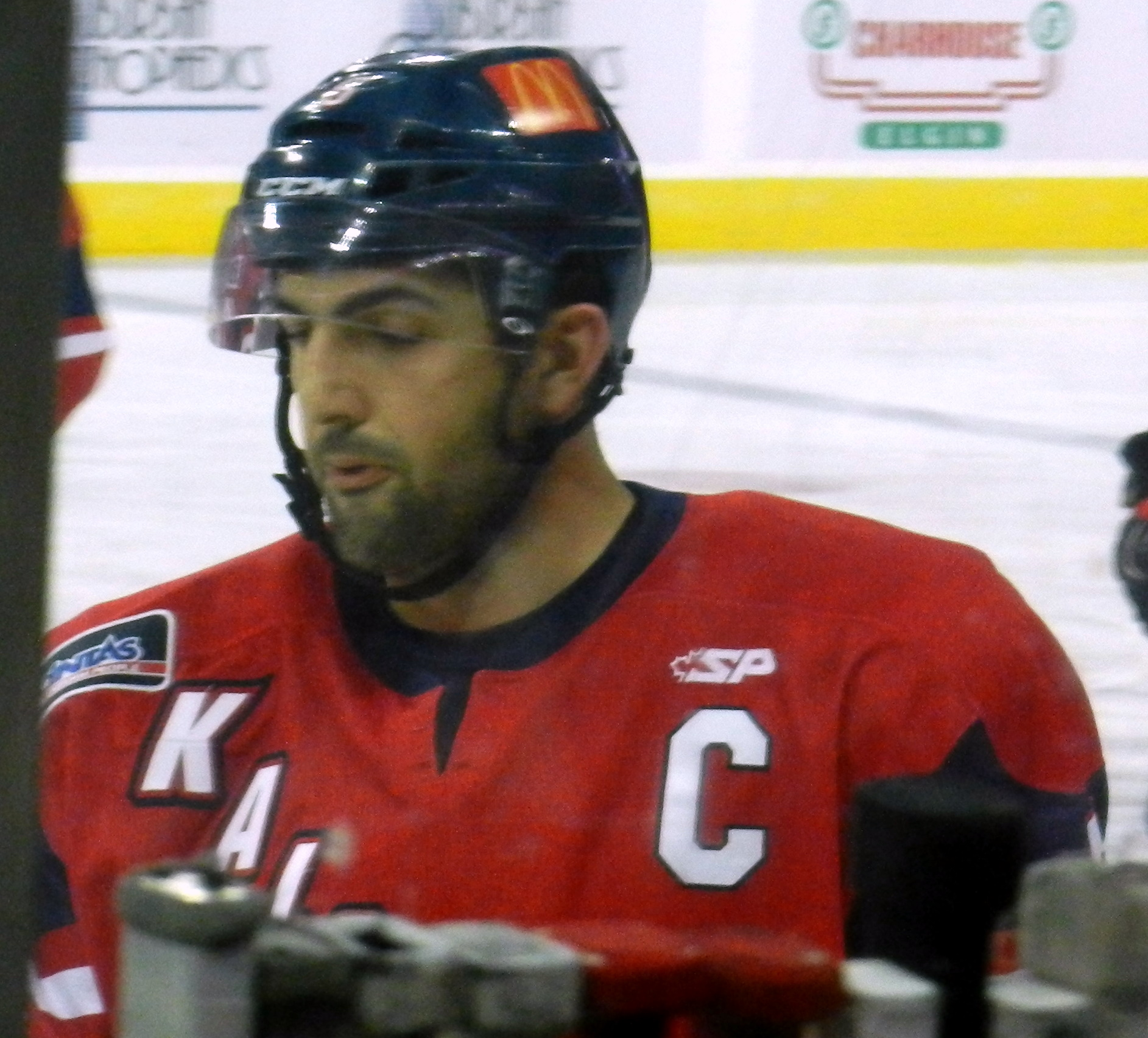
- Born: March 3, 1986 (age 40) Windsor, Ontario, Canada
- Height: 6 ft 4 in (193 cm)
- Weight: 200 lb (91 kg; 14 st 4 lb)
- Position: Defence
- Shot: Left
- Played for: Colorado Avalanche
- NHL draft: 115th overall, 2004; New York Islanders
- Playing career: 2007–2013

Wes Samuel O'Neill (born March 3, 1986, in Windsor, Ontario) is a Canadian former professional ice hockey defenseman who previously played with the Colorado Avalanche organization of the National Hockey League.

== Playing career ==
O'Neill was drafted 115th overall in the 2004 NHL entry draft by the New York Islanders. Originally from the Green Bay Gamblers of the USHL he was to play for Canada at the World U18 Championships in 2004. He then committed to play four years of collegiate hockey at Notre Dame culminating in a conference championship in 2007.

O'Neill signed as a free agent by the Colorado Avalanche on August 20, 2007. He made his professional debut in the 2007–08 season with the Avalanche's affiliate, the Lake Erie Monsters. O'Neill spent the majority of the year with the Monsters before he was sent to the Johnstown Chiefs of the ECHL for their playoff run.

In the 2008–09 season, O'Neill received his first NHL recall on March 27, 2009. He made his NHL debut with the Avalanche on the same day, in a 4–1 defeat to the Vancouver Canucks. He was sent back down to the Lake Erie Monsters on April 4, 2009.

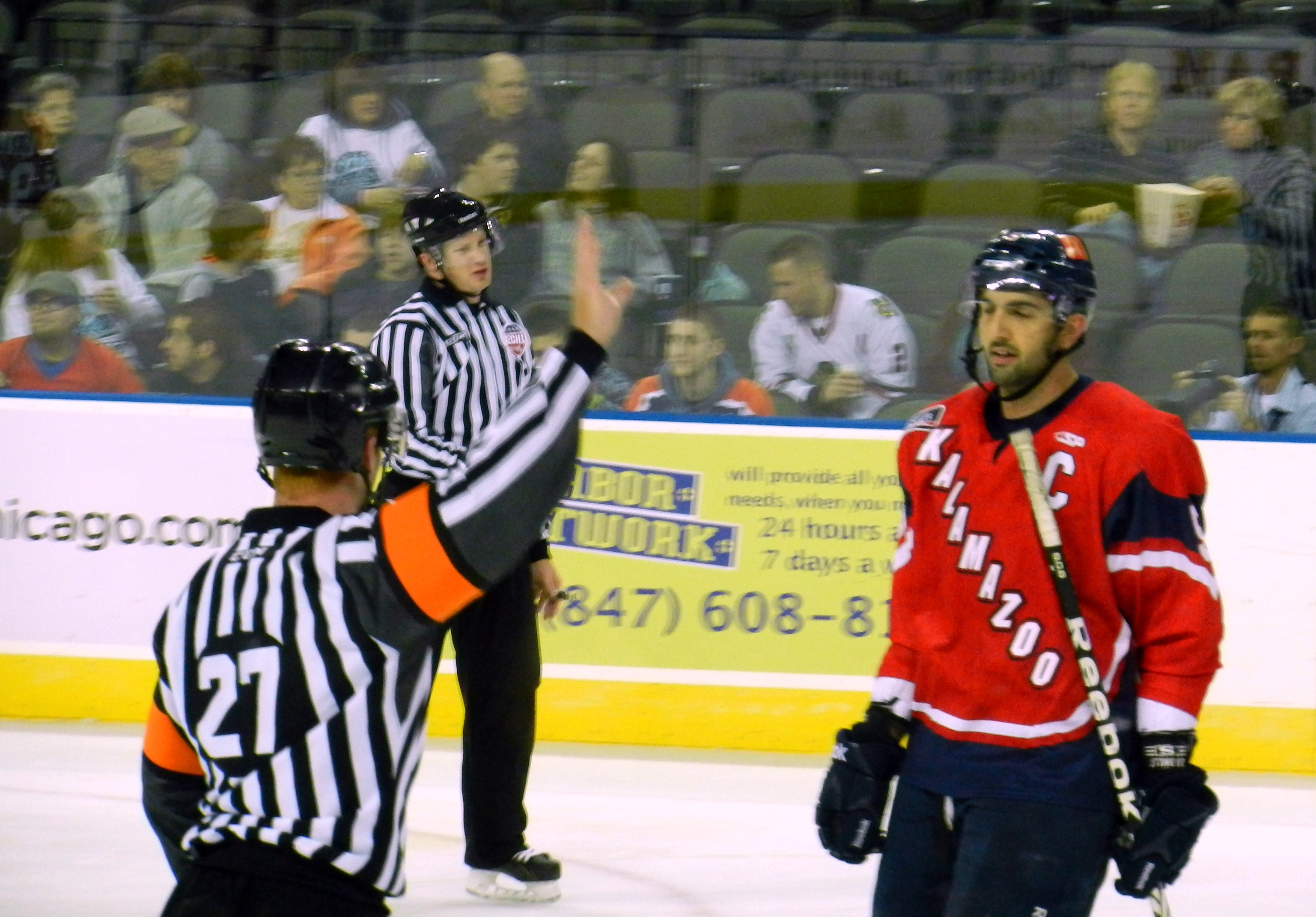
O'Neill speaking with a referee following a penalty while with the K-Wings

Wes was assigned to Lake Erie and recorded a career-high 15 points in the 2009–10 season. Wes became the Monsters franchise leader in games played with 159 and appeared in a further two games for the Avalanche in a brief stint in January.

O'Neill was not retained by the Avalanche and was rendered a free agent at season's end. Unable to attract an NHL offer prior to the 2010–11 season, O'Neill accepted a try-out to the reigning AHL Champions, the Hershey Bears, training camp but failed to attain a contract. With the season underway, Wes signed with Kalamazoo Wings of the ECHL on a one-year contract on October 18, 2010. As Captain of the K-Wings, O'Neill appeared in 13 games before he was signed on a professional try-out contract by AHL affiliate, the Bridgeport Sound Tigers, on November 19, 2010.

After a second injury hit season with the Wings, O'Neill left as a free agent and signed a one-year contract with ECHL competitor the Toledo Walleye on September 4, 2012. At the conclusion of the 2012-13 season, O'Neill opted to retire from hockey after 6 professional seasons.

== Career statistics ==
=== Regular season and playoffs ===
			Regular season					Playoffs
Season	Team	League	GP	G	A	Pts	PIM	GP	G	A	Pts	PIM
2000–01	Chatham Maroons	GOHL	51	6	9	15	50	—	—	—	—	—
2001–02	Chatham Maroons	WOHL	51	9	36	45	40	—	—	—	—	—
2002–03	Green Bay Gamblers	USHL	50	2	15	17	79	—	—	—	—	—
2003–04	Notre Dame University	CCHA	39	2	10	12	28	—	—	—	—	—
2004–05	Notre Dame University	CCHA	38	6	14	20	52	—	—	—	—	—
2005–06	Notre Dame University	CCHA	35	6	19	25	40	—	—	—	—	—
2006–07	Notre Dame University	CCHA	42	3	18	21	40	—	—	—	—	—
2007–08	Lake Erie Monsters	AHL	51	2	4	6	50	—	—	—	—	—
2007–08	Johnstown Chiefs	ECHL	6	0	1	1	2	6	0	0	0	8
2008–09	Johnstown Chiefs	ECHL	6	0	1	1	0	—	—	—	—	—
2008–09	Lake Erie Monsters	AHL	54	1	5	6	34	—	—	—	—	—
2008–09	Colorado Avalanche	NHL	3	0	0	0	4	—	—	—	—	—
2009–10	Lake Erie Monsters	AHL	54	1	14	15	41	—	—	—	—	—
2009–10	Colorado Avalanche	NHL	2	0	0	0	2	—	—	—	—	—
2010–11	Kalamazoo Wings	ECHL	23	2	1	3	39	19	0	5	5	10
2010–11	Bridgeport Sound Tigers	AHL	33	4	3	7	21	—	—	—	—	—
2011–12	Kalamazoo Wings	ECHL	29	0	2	2	48	14	0	3	3	8
2012–13	Toledo Walleye	ECHL	65	11	21	32	70	6	0	0	0	6
2012–13	Providence Bruins	AHL	2	1	0	1	0	—	—	—	—	—
2012–13	Houston Aeros	AHL	5	0	0	0	0	—	—	—	—	—
AHL totals			199	9	26	35	146	—	—	—	—	—
NHL totals			5	0	0	0	6	—	—	—	—	—

=== International ===
Year	Team	Event	GP	G	A	Pts	PIM
2003	Canada	U18	5	1	4	5	0
2004	Canada	WJC18	7	1	1	2	2
Junior totals			12	2	5	7	2

== Awards and honours ==
Award	Year
CCHA All-Tournament Team	2007
