= Paul Szczechura =

Canadian ice hockey player (born 1985)

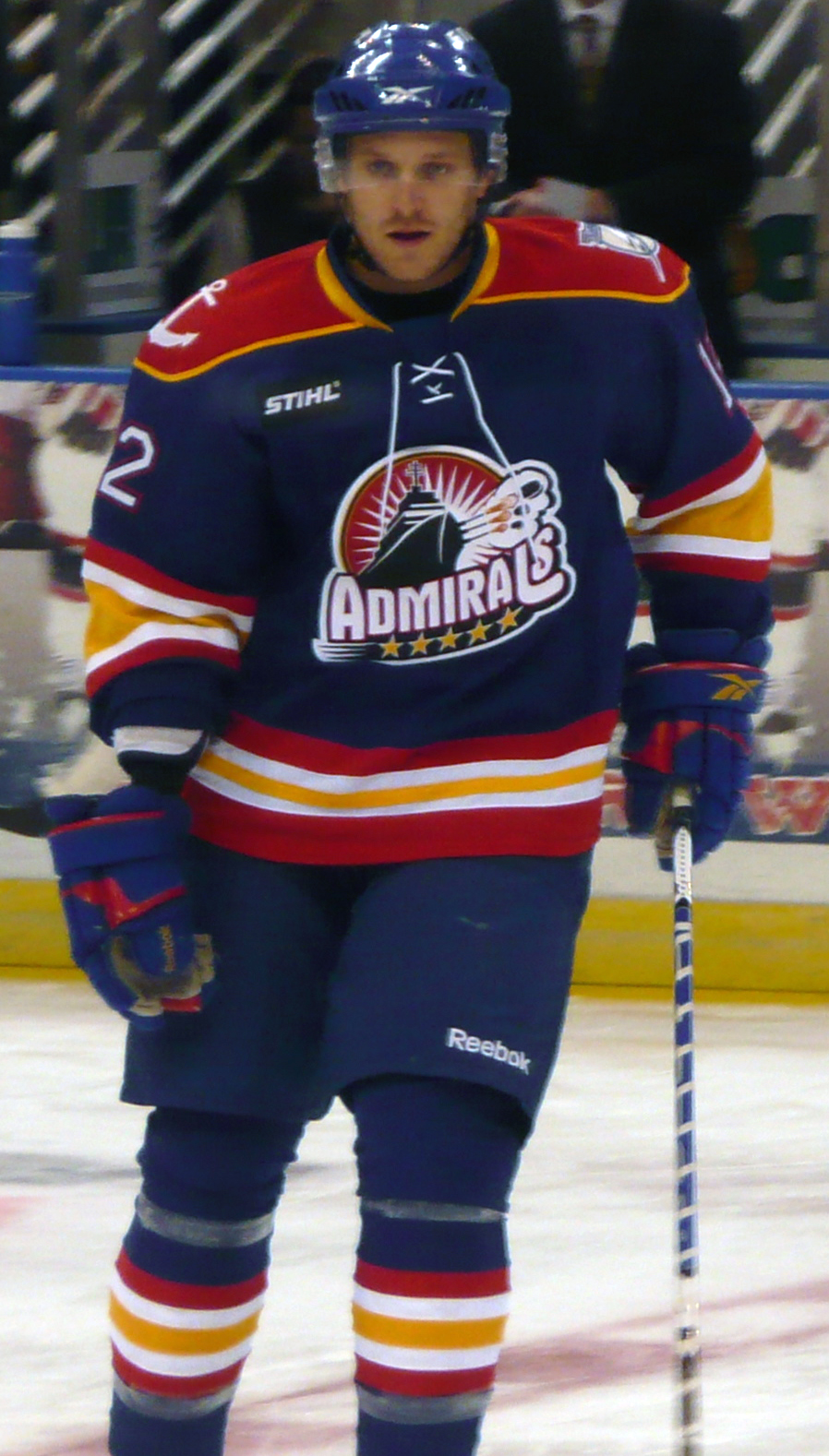
- Born: November 30, 1985 (age 40) Brantford, Ontario, Canada
- Height: 5 ft 11 in (180 cm)
- Weight: 175 lb (79 kg; 12 st 7 lb)
- Position: Centre
- Shoots: Right
- team Former teams: GKS Tychy; Tampa Bay Lightning; Buffalo Sabres; HC Lev Praha; Dinamo Riga; Dinamo Minsk; Traktor Chelyabinsk; Torpedo Nizhny Novgorod
- NHL draft: Undrafted
- Playing career: 2007–present

Paul Szczechura (/ʃɪˈhʊərə/; born November 30, 1985) is a Canadian professional ice hockey forward. He is currently an unrestricted free agent who most recently played for Torpedo Nizhny Novgorod of the Kontinental Hockey League (KHL).

== Early life ==
Szczechura grew up in the small town of Brantford, Ontario which is the hometown of other professional hockey players such as Wayne Gretzky, Pat Hickey, Chris Gratton, Keith Jones and Adam Henrique. He is of Polish descent.

== Playing career ==
Szczechura grew up playing hockey in his hometown of Brantford playing minor hockey for both the Brantford Saints and Brant Bandits AAA hockey programs. He played in the 1999 Quebec International Pee-Wee Hockey Tournament with Brantford. After being drafted in the 11th round of the 2001 OHL Priority Selection by the Barrie Colts, Szczechura decided to pursue an NCAA scholarship and played three seasons with the Brantford Golden Eagles of the OHA Midwestern Ontario Jr. B. League. He accepted a scholarship to Western Michigan University in 2003.

Previously, Szczechura played for Western Michigan University (CCHA), the Iowa Stars (AHL) and the Norfolk Admirals (AHL). He signed with the Lightning as a free agent on April 24, 2008, and debuted against the Philadelphia Flyers on December 2, 2008. He scored his first NHL goal against Tim Thomas of the Boston Bruins on December 8, 2008. Szczechura scored his second career goal and assisted on another Lightning goal on December 23, 2008 against the Pittsburgh Penguins, and was named the first star of the game. He was later signed by the Buffalo Sabres to play with their AHL affiliate, the Rochester Americans. On November 26, 2011, the Sabres recalled Szczechura.

On May 22, 2012, it was announced that Szczechura signed a one-year contract to join Czech team HC Lev for their first foray into the Kontinental Hockey League. Szczechura appeared in three games to start the 2012–13 season, before losing his place in the high flying Lev squad. On September 26, 2012, Szczechura signed contract to transfer over with fellow KHL, club Dinamo Riga. After two seasons, in May 2014 he signed a two-year contract with HC Dinamo Minsk. After his contract had expired, he moved fellow to KHL outfit Traktor Chelyabinsk, signing in May 2016.

A free agent from Chelyabinsk after three seasons, Szczechura extended his KHL career by agreeing to a one-year contract with his fifth KHL club, Torpedo Nizhny Novgorod on July 16, 2019.

== Career statistics ==
			Regular season					Playoffs
Season	Team	League	GP	G	A	Pts	PIM	GP	G	A	Pts	PIM
2002–03	Brantford Golden Eagles	OMHA	42	29	41	70	28	—	—	—	—	—
2003–04	Western Michigan University	NCAA	39	9	11	20	12	—	—	—	—	—
2004–05	Western Michigan University	NCAA	37	6	23	29	22	—	—	—	—	—
2005–06	Western Michigan University	NCAA	40	10	26	36	47	—	—	—	—	—
2006–07	Western Michigan University	NCAA	37	19	26	45	26	—	—	—	—	—
2006–07	Iowa Stars	AHL	14	3	4	7	19	10	3	1	4	8
2007–08	Iowa Stars	AHL	29	2	3	5	15	—	—	—	—	—
2007–08	Norfolk Admirals	AHL	24	14	12	26	16	—	—	—	—	—
2008–09	Norfolk Admirals	AHL	33	13	16	29	26	—	—	—	—	—
2008–09	Tampa Bay Lightning	NHL	31	4	5	9	12	—	—	—	—	—
2009–10	Norfolk Admirals	AHL	35	8	21	29	24	—	—	—	—	—
2009–10	Tampa Bay Lightning	NHL	52	5	2	7	18	—	—	—	—	—
2010–11	Norfolk Admirals	AHL	79	22	30	52	43	3	1	0	1	4
2011–12	Rochester Americans	AHL	56	21	26	47	26	3	0	1	1	0
2011–12	Buffalo Sabres	NHL	9	1	3	4	4	—	—	—	—	—
2012–13	HC Lev Praha	KHL	3	0	0	0	2	—	—	—	—	—
2012–13	Dinamo Rīga	KHL	43	8	20	28	20	—	—	—	—	—
2013–14	Dinamo Rīga	KHL	53	17	18	35	42	7	0	4	4	6
2014–15	Dinamo Minsk	KHL	55	14	26	40	38	5	0	1	1	0
2015–16	Dinamo Minsk	KHL	45	13	15	28	32	—	—	—	—	—
2016–17	Traktor Chelyabinsk	KHL	60	14	27	41	32	6	1	2	3	2
2017–18	Traktor Chelyabinsk	KHL	55	20	22	42	26	14	1	5	6	6
2018–19	Traktor Chelyabinsk	KHL	41	10	5	15	14	—	—	—	—	—
2019–20	Torpedo Nizhny Novgorod	KHL	40	4	11	15	12	4	0	0	0	0
NHL totals			92	10	10	20	20	—	—	—	—	—
KHL totals			395	100	144	244	216	36	2	12	14	14
