= Jeff Zatkoff =

American ice hockey player

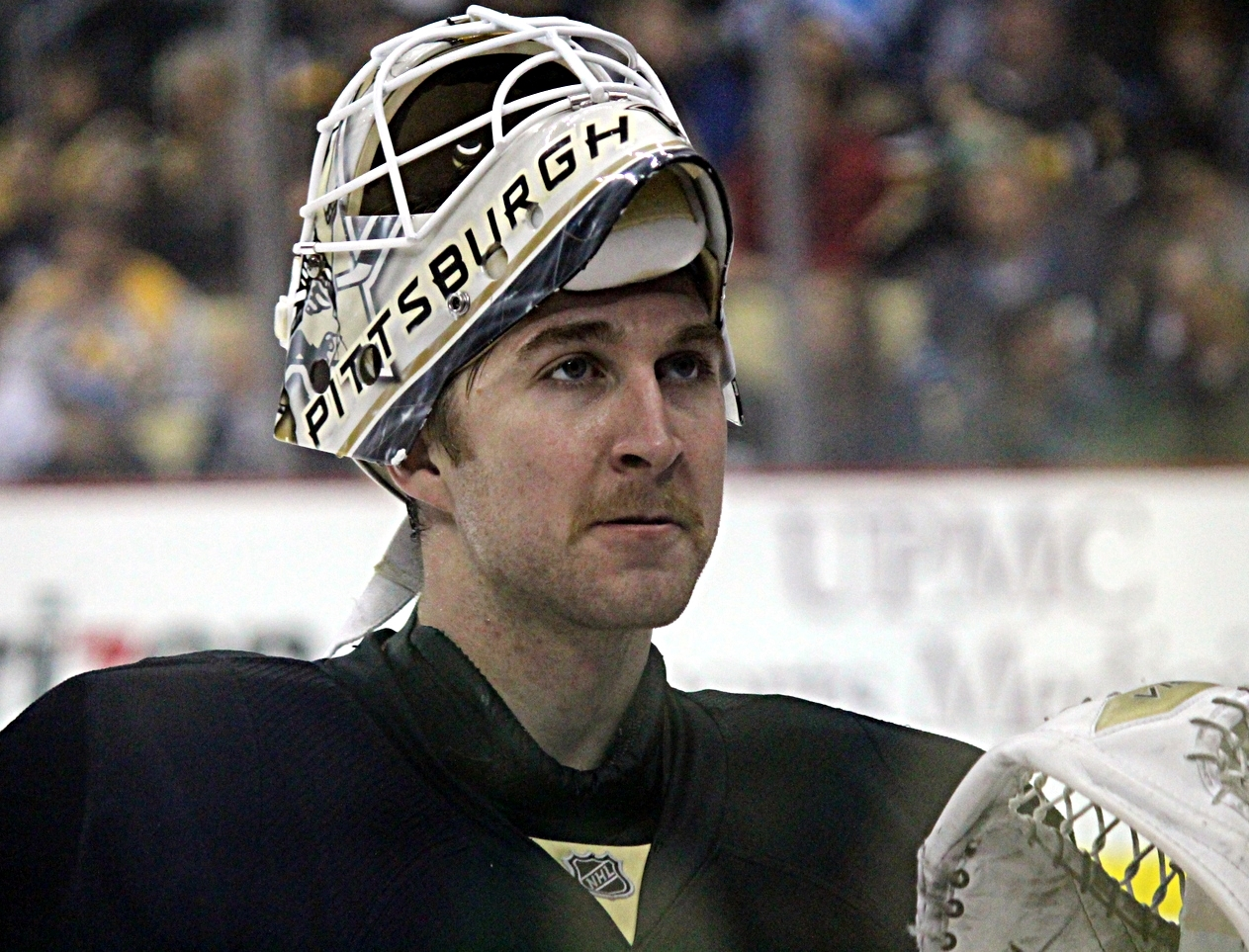
- Zatkoff with the Pittsburgh Penguins in 2014
- Born: June 9, 1987 (age 39) Detroit, Michigan, U.S.
- Height: 6 ft 2 in (188 cm)
- Weight: 179 lb (81 kg; 12 st 11 lb)
- Position: Goaltender
- Caught: Left
- Played for: Pittsburgh Penguins; Los Angeles Kings; Straubing Tigers
- NHL draft: 74th overall, 2006; Los Angeles Kings
- Playing career: 2008–2020

Jeff Zatkoff (born June 9, 1987) is an American former professional ice hockey goaltender. He most recently played for the Straubing Tigers of the Deutsche Eishockey Liga (DEL).

== Playing career ==
As a youth, Zatkoff played in the 2001 Quebec International Pee-Wee Hockey Tournament with the Detroit Little Caesars minor ice hockey team.

=== College ===
Zatkoff was drafted in the third round of the 2006 NHL entry draft, 74th overall, by the Los Angeles Kings after playing collegiately for the Miami University Redhawks. Zatkoff was named CCHA All-Conference Team honorable mention in 2006–07 as a sophomore. He was also named Rookie of the Year in 2005–06 as a freshman for the Redhawks, starting 20 games and helping lead the team to a regular-season CCHA Conference title.

=== Professional ===
==== Los Angeles Kings ====
On April 10, 2008, Zatkoff signed a three-year entry-level contract with the Los Angeles Kings. Zatkoff was also signed to an amateur try-out agreement with the Ontario Reign on April 11, 2008. He made his professional debut with the Reign, appearing in 37 games during the 2008–09 season. Zatkoff played for the Manchester Monarchs through the 2011–12 season.

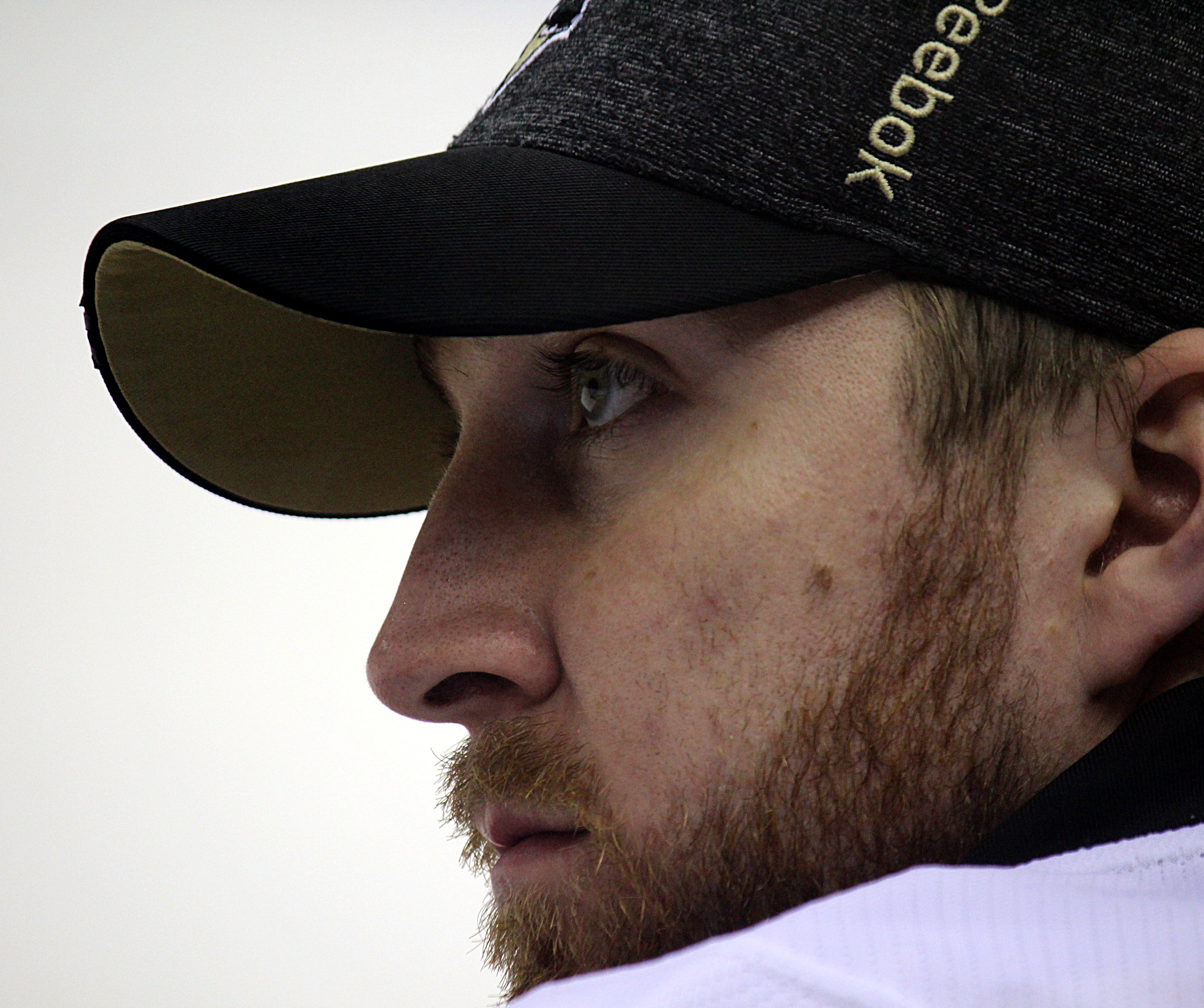
Zatkoff with the Penguins during the 2016 Stanley Cup playoffs

==== Pittsburgh Penguins ====
Zatkoff signed a two-year contract with the Pittsburgh Penguins on July 1, 2012. On March 28, 2013, Zatkoff was recalled by Pittsburgh to be a backup for Tomas Vokoun for a game against the Winnipeg Jets due to a neck injury suffered by Marc-André Fleury. Vokoun played the entire game and Zatkoff was returned to Wilkes-Barre the following day when doctors cleared Fleury to return. Zatkoff and teammate Brad Thiessen were awarded with the Harry "Hap" Holmes Memorial Award at the conclusion of the 2012–13 AHL season. The Hap Holmes Award is given to the goaltender(s) who play at least 25 games for the team that allows the fewest goals against over the course of the season.

Zatkoff was expected to spend the 2013–14 season with the Wilkes-Barre/Scranton Penguins. However, a blood clot suffered by Vokoun meant that Zatkoff started the season backing up Pittsburgh starter Marc-André Fleury. On October 11, 2013, Zatkoff made his NHL debut, making 24 saves in a 6–3 loss to the Florida Panthers. His first NHL victory was a 3–0 shutout of the Blue Jackets in Columbus on November 2, 2013.

On April 13, 2016, Zatkoff started game one of the Penguins' first round series against the New York Rangers. Regular starter Marc-André Fleury was out with a concussion and backup Matt Murray was also in concussion protocol. Zatkoff made 35 saves on 37 shots and was named the game's second star, helping the Penguins to a 5–2 win. After a loss in game two, Zatkoff was replaced by Murray, who remained in net for the rest of the playoffs despite Fleury's eventual return to the lineup. The Penguins eventually won the Stanley Cup on June 12, 2016, against the San Jose Sharks; the victory earned him a Stanley Cup ring, his name on the Cup and the nickname "Mr. Game One" among teammates and fans.

==== Return to Los Angeles ====
On July 1, 2016, Zatkoff ended his tenure with the Penguins, returning to the Kings on a one-year, two-way free agent contract. Installed as the Kings backup for the 2016–17 season, Zatkoff struggled to find form and despite the loss of starting goaltender Jonathan Quick to long-term injury, he was surpassed on the depth chart and assigned to AHL affiliate, the Ontario Reign after 13 games.

==== Columbus Blue Jackets ====
Not having played a game past the midpoint of the 2016–17 season, on January 22, 2018, Zatkoff was traded by the Kings to the Columbus Blue Jackets in exchange for future considerations. He was immediately assigned to the team's AHL affiliate, the Cleveland Monsters.

==== Europe ====
As a free agent from the Blue Jackets in the following off-season, and with little NHL interest, Zatkoff opted to pursue a European career in signing a one-year contract with German club, the Straubing Tigers of the DEL, on July 6, 2018.

== International play ==
Medal record

Representing United States

Ice hockey

World Junior Championships
Bronze medal – third place	2007 Sweden	

Zatkoff represented the United States at the 2007 World Junior Ice Hockey Championships, held in Sweden, where his team earned a bronze medal.

== Personal life ==
Jeff is the great nephew of Roger Zatkoff, who played in the National Football League for the Detroit Lions and Green Bay Packers. His father, Jeff, was drafted by the Indiana Pacers of the National Basketball Association after playing collegiately at Eastern Michigan, and attended high school at Chippewa Valley High School.

== Career statistics ==
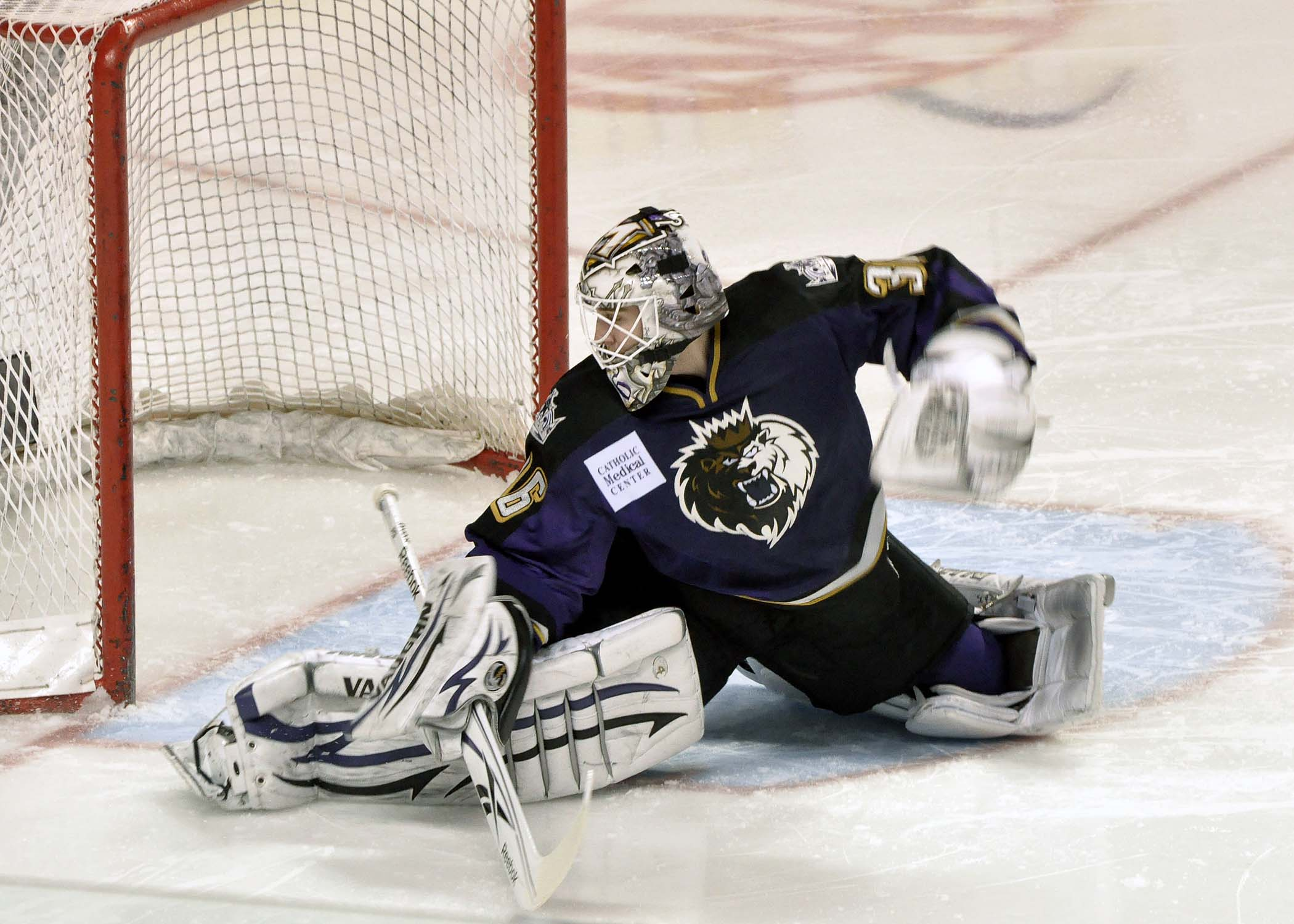
With the Monarchs

=== Regular season and playoffs ===
			Regular season									Playoffs
Season	Team	League	GP	W	L	T/OT	MIN	GA	SO	GAA	SV%	GP	W	L	MIN	GA	SO	GAA	SV%
2004–05	Sioux City Musketeers	USHL	24	13	6	3	1,271	54	1	2.55	.914	2	0	0	67	10	0	8.88	.706
2005–06	Miami RedHawks	CCHA	20	14	5	1	1,217	41	3	2.02	.928	—	—	—	—	—	—	—	—
2006–07	Miami RedHawks	CCHA	26	14	8	3	1,542	58	1	2.26	.919	—	—	—	—	—	—	—	—
2007–08	Miami RedHawks	CCHA	36	27	8	1	2,161	62	3	1.72	.933	—	—	—	—	—	—	—	—
2008–09	Ontario Reign	ECHL	37	17	15	3	2,164	107	1	2.97	.915	7	3	3	418	26	0	3.73	.872
2008–09	Manchester Monarchs	AHL	3	1	2	0	182	7	0	2.31	.918	—	—	—	—	—	—	—	—
2009–10	Manchester Monarchs	AHL	22	10	9	0	1,170	57	2	2.92	.915	—	—	—	—	—	—	—	—
2010–11	Manchester Monarchs	AHL	45	20	17	5	2,508	112	3	2.68	.911	5	1	3	253	16	0	3.80	.891
2011–12	Manchester Monarchs	AHL	44	21	17	1	2,431	101	3	2.49	.920	2	0	2	97	7	0	4.34	.865
2012–13	Wilkes-Barre/Scranton Penguins	AHL	49	26	20	0	2,799	90	5	1.93	.920	5	2	3	253	23	0	5.45	.838
2013–14	Pittsburgh Penguins	NHL	20	12	6	2	1,171	51	1	2.61	.912	—	—	—	—	—	—	—	—
2014–15	Wilkes-Barre/Scranton Penguins	AHL	37	18	14	4	2,155	88	3	2.45	.910	2	0	0	59	1	0	1.02	.958
2014–15	Pittsburgh Penguins	NHL	1	0	1	0	37	1	0	1.62	.941	—	—	—	—	—	—	—	—
2015–16	Pittsburgh Penguins	NHL	14	4	7	1	732	34	0	2.79	.917	2	1	1	117	6	0	3.07	.908
2016–17	Los Angeles Kings	NHL	13	2	7	1	551	27	0	2.95	.879	—	—	—	—	—	—	—	—
2016–17	Ontario Reign	AHL	8	2	3	3	458	23	0	3.01	.900	—	—	—	—	—	—	—	—
2017–18	Cleveland Monsters	AHL	17	4	9	2	912	49	2	3.22	.885	—	—	—	—	—	—	—	—
2018–19	Straubing Tigers	DEL	45	24	20	0	2,633	114	4	2.60	.910	2	0	2	127	7	0	3.00	.910
2019–20	Straubing Tigers	DEL	30	22	6	0	1,696	68	1	2.41	.911	—	—	—	—	—	—	—	—
NHL totals			48	18	21	4	2,491	113	1	2.72	.908	2	1	1	117	6	0	3.07	.908

== Awards and honors ==
Award	Year
College
All-CCHA Second Team	2007–08
CCHA All-Tournament Team	2008
AHL
Harry "Hap" Holmes Memorial Award	2013
NHL
Stanley Cup champion	2016

Awards and achievements
Preceded by David Brown	CCHA Best Goaltender; 2007–08	Succeeded by Chad Johnson
