= James Glenwright Unger =

American ice hockey player

- Born: January 18, 1985 (age 41) Garfield Heights, OH, USA
- Height: 6 ft 2 in (188 cm)
- Weight: 187 lb (85 kg; 13 st 5 lb)
- Position: Forward
- Shot: Right
- Played for: Johnstown Chiefs; Toledo Storm
- Playing career: 2007–2008

James Glenwright Unger (born January 18, 1985) is a retired American hockey player. He most recently played with the Johnstown Chiefs of the ECHL during the 2007–08 ECHL season.

== Playing career ==
Early Career

The Cleveland Barons drafted James Unger in the 2001 NAHL Entry Draft.

Round: 2nd Overall: 14th Team: Cleveland Barons Position: Forward Birth year: 1985 Previous team: Cleveland Barons Midget AAA The draft was held in May 2001, when Unger was only 16.

Cleveland selected him 14th overall despite him being a player born in 1985.

He was actually one of two Cleveland Barons Midget AAA forwards selected by Cleveland in the second round: Unger at No. 14 and Nick Biondo at No. 18. The Barons also selected Ben Camper, Brent Cooper, Jason Dest, Steve Phillips and Mike Brown later in the draft

Unger was first noticed as a standout forward for the Topeka ScareCrows during the 2001–2003 seasons in the USHL. During his time in Topeka, Unger compiled 52 points in 100 games played, scoring 23 goals, 29 assists, and 181 penalty minutes.

Roller Hockey Unger was a standout in the Cleveland/Ohio roller-hockey scene from a young age. At the 2000 AAU Junior Olympics, he was the MVP of the 14U tournament for Team Xtreme, while Team Xtreme won the division. A AAU Sports At the 2003 AAU Junior Olympics, he was the MVP of the first-ever High School division, with Trinity defeating Walled Lake 6–5 for the gold medal.

Team USA

At the 2002 Select 17 Festival in St. Cloud, USHR published its list of tournament standouts. Unger was ranked No. 5 overall:

Drew Stafford — Minnesota Aaron Bader — Dakota Ben Gordon — Minnesota James Unger — Dakota Actually, the source's formatting is important: it lists Unger as No. 5, following Stafford, Bader, Gordon and another player. The relevant scouting entry describes him as a 6'2", 180-lb. Cleveland native with good hand skills, competitiveness and grit, while identifying skating as his main weakness. He was also selected for the U.S. team traveling to the Czech Republic.

Unger was a top-five performer at the 2002 Select 17 Festival, not merely a participant.

That's significant because the Select 17 Festival was the evaluation event from which the 2002 U.S. Under-18 Select Team was chosen. Unger made that team, and he subsequently scored against the Czech Republic in international play.

Player of the Game vs. Sweden — On August 15, 2002, Unger scored the opening goal and was named USA's Player of the Game in the 5–3 win over Sweden. The contemporary report called him the top U.S. player in the tournament to that point.

Unger played university hockey at Bowling Green State University from 2003 to 2007. During his 129 GP for BGSU, Unger amassed 78 total points, 40 career goals, 38 assists, and 189 penalty minutes. The defining moment of Unger's college career came when he set a CCHA record in 2007. The record is for most goals scored in a period with 4 goals in a 7–5 loss vs. University of Nebraska at Omaha.

Unger's short-lived pro career came in the ECHL with the Toledo Storm during the 2006–07 season in which he had 1 GP with no points. During the 2006–07 ECHL playoffs, he had 4 GP with 1 goal and 2 assists. The following season Unger had a brief stint with the Johnstown Chiefs in which he played in two games but did not score.

== Personal ==
Unger retired from professional hockey in February 2008 and has since started a career in the financial services industry.
