= Trent Campbell =

Canadian ice hockey player

- Born: December 24, 1982 (age 43) Beauval, Saskatchewan, Canada
- Height: 5 ft 10 in (178 cm)
- Weight: 175 lb (79 kg; 12 st 7 lb)
- Position: Left wing
- Shot: Left
- FCHL team Former teams: Rosthern Wheat Kings; Ours de Villard-de-Lans; Portland Pirates; Worcester Sharks; Houston Aeros; Bridgeport Sound Tigers
- NHL draft: Undrafted
- Playing career: 2007–2012

Trent Campbell (born December 24, 1982, in Beauval, Saskatchewan, Canada) is a former professional ice hockey winger who currently plays senior men's hockey for the Rosthern Wheat Kings of the Fort Carlton Hockey League.

== Playing career ==
Campbell played junior hockey for the La Ronge Ice Wolves of the SJHL, before attending Lake Superior State University, where he played hockey for 4 seasons between 2003 and 2007.

Campbell joined the South Carolina Stingrays of the ECHL in 2007, and has played at least part of a season with them for every season of his professional career. He has been called up to the AHL several times, spending time with the Portland Pirates, Worcester Sharks, Houston Aeros, and Bridgeport Sound Tigers.

After the 2011–12 season with the Stingrays, Campbell announced his retirement from professional hockey.

== Personal life ==
=== Arrest ===
While on a road trip to play the Florida Everblades in 2012, Campbell was arrested for Grand Theft Auto by Collier County Sheriff's officers after he allegedly stole a taxi outside an upscale Naples, Florida, bar. He was indefinitely suspended from the team pending the outcome of his case.

== Career statistics ==
			Regular season					Playoffs
Season	Team	League	GP	G	A	Pts	PIM	GP	G	A	Pts	PIM
2003–04	Lake Superior State University	CCHA	36	4	14	18	10	—	—	—	—	—
2004–05	Lake Superior State University	CCHA	38	6	10	16	34	—	—	—	—	—
2005–06	Lake Superior State University	CCHA	36	14	12	26	32	—	—	—	—	—
2006–07	Lake Superior State University	CCHA	43	12	18	30	26	—	—	—	—	—
2007–08	Ours de Villard-de-Lans	Ligue Magnus	7	2	2	4	8	—	—	—	—	—
2007–08	South Carolina Stingrays	ECHL	57	22	27	49	35	20	6	8	14	10
2008–09	South Carolina Stingrays	ECHL	37	11	27	38	37	23	6	18	24	13
2008–09	Portland Pirates	AHL	17	3	5	8	2	—	—	—	—	—
2008–09	Worcester Sharks	AHL	16	2	5	7	6	—	—	—	—	—
2009–10	South Carolina Stingrays	ECHL	60	20	48	68	24	5	0	1	1	0
2009–10	Worcester Sharks	AHL	3	1	0	1	2	—	—	—	—	—
2009–10	Houston Aeros	AHL	3	0	1	1	0	—	—	—	—	—
2010–11	South Carolina Stingrays	ECHL	45	18	20	38	32	4	2	1	3	0
2010–11	Bridgeport Sound Tigers	AHL	16	1	1	2	0	—	—	—	—	—
2011–12	South Carolina Stingrays	ECHL	63	16	34	50	39	—	—	—	—	—
2013–14	Rosthern Wheat Kings	FCHL	17	27	22	49	14	7	7	12	19	4
ECHL totals			262	87	156	243	167	52	14	28	42	23
AHL totals			55	7	12	19	10	—	—	—	—	—
