= Mark Bomersback =

Canadian ice hockey player

- Born: July 8, 1982 (age 44) Rochester, Alberta, Canada
- Height: 5 ft 10 in (178 cm)
- Weight: 187 lb (85 kg; 13 st 5 lb)
- Position: Left wing
- Shot: Left
- Played for: Iowa Stars; Providence Bruins; Syracuse Crunch; Binghamton Senators; HC Plzeň; Metallurg Novokuznetsk; Lukko; SCL Tigers; Piráti Chomutov
- NHL draft: Undrafted
- Playing career: 2007–2017

Mark Bomersback (born July 8, 1982) is a Canadian former professional ice hockey player.

As an amateur player Bomersback set the all-time scoring record in the Alberta Junior Hockey League (AJHL) completing his AJHL career tallying 396 points in 250 games.

== Playing career ==
Bomersback set an all-time scoring record in the Alberta Junior Hockey League (AJHL), completing his AJHL career tallying 396 points in 250 games.

In the 2002-2003 AJHL season Mark posted 114 points in 64 games to lead the Canmore Eagles in scoring and was named the RBC Financial Group Canadian Junior “A” (CJAHL) Player Of The Year. He played the 2009–10 season in the HC Plzeň 1929 in the Czech Extraliga. He was named the best newcomer of Czech Extraliga in the 2009–10.
