= Simon Gysbers =

Canadian ice hockey player

- Born: May 7, 1987 (age 39) Richmond Hill, Ontario, Canada
- Height: 6 ft 4 in (193 cm)
- Weight: 185 lb (84 kg; 13 st 3 lb)
- Position: Defence
- Shot: Right
- Played for: Toronto Marlies; Ilves; TPS; Djurgårdens IF; KHL Medveščak Zagreb; Schwenninger Wild Wings
- NHL draft: Undrafted
- Playing career: 2010–2017

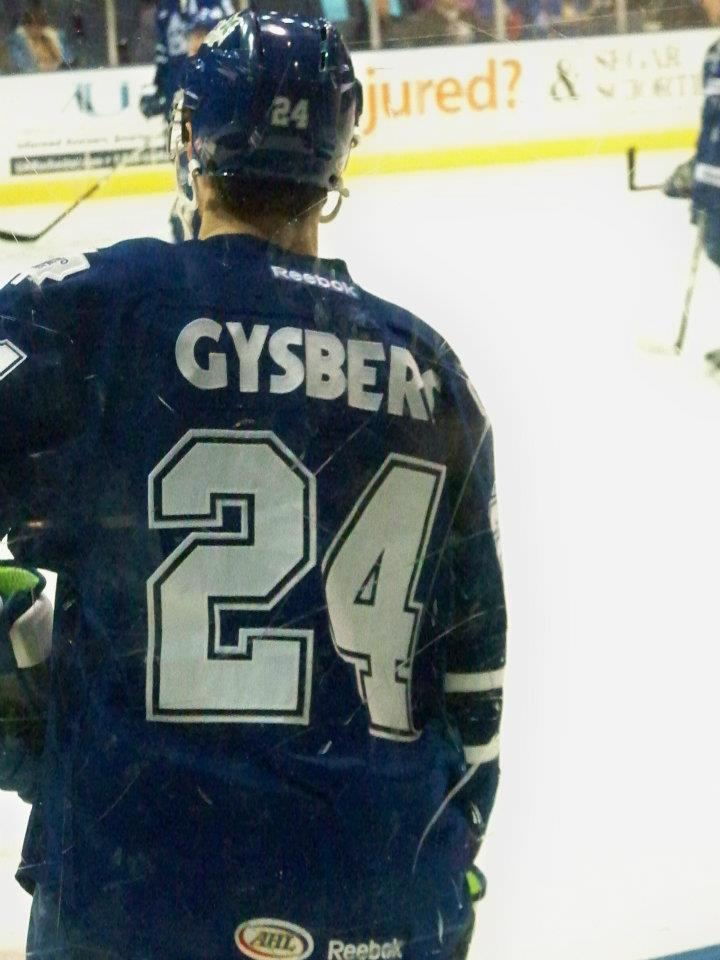

Simon Gysbers (born May 7, 1987) is a former Canadian professional ice hockey defenceman. He played in the American Hockey League with the Toronto Marlies before spending his career largely in Europe finishing his career with the Schwenninger Wild Wings in the Deutsche Eishockey Liga (DEL).

== Playing career ==
=== Amateur ===
Gysbers began his junior career with the Stouffville Spirit of the Ontario Junior Hockey League (OPJHL) in the 2003–04 season. He played for the same team for three seasons. He was named the league's outstanding defenseman in 2004–05 season. Next season, he was the Ontario Provincial Junior Hockey League's Defenseman of the Year after totaling eight goals and 24 assists for the Stouffville Spirit in the 2005–06 season. He also helped lead the Spirit to the OPJHL North/West Conference title with a 26–10–9 record and played in the Canadian Junior A all-star game. Prior to the 2006 National Hockey League Entry Draft, was ranked 153rd on the NHL's Central Scouting List.

Starting with the 2006–07 season, he played for Lake Superior State University of the CCHA, where he shared Soo BlueLiners Outstanding Freshman Award with teammate Nathan Perkovich and finished second among Lakers rookies in terms of points and was fourth on the team overall in points during the CCHA playoffs, despite missing one of the seven games due to an injury. He also earned his first two collegiate points during the Lakers' 7–6 overtime victory at Ohio State University. He scored his first career goal during a 3–2 overtime victory over Nebraska-Omaha. In addition, he scored a goal in each game of the Lakers' three-game CCHA playoffs first-round series against Ferris State University. Lastly, he finished second among Lakers defensemen in plus-minus rating at +5.

=== Professional ===
On March 14, 2010, The Toronto Marlies signed defenceman Simon Gysbers to an amateur try-out contract. In the 2011–12 regular season, Simon was the team's defense points leader. In Game #5 of the AHL Western Conference Finals, Simon scored the winning goal (and what many consider to be the biggest of his AHL career) to break a 1–1 tie and help propel the Marlies to the Calder Cup Final.

On July 17, 2012, Gysbers was signed to a one-year contract extension to remain with the Maple Leafs.

After parts of four seasons within the Maple Leafs organization, Gysbers left as a free agent to pursue a European career. On August 7, 2013, Gysbers signed a one-year deal with Ilves of the Finnish Liiga. At the conclusion of the 2013–14 season, Gysbers transferred to fellow Finnish club, HC TPS on May 5, 2014.

In the 2014–15 season, Gysbers appeared in 44 games with TPS before opting for a mid-season transfer to the Swedish Hockey League with Djurgårdens IF on January 31, 2015. The 2015-16 season saw him skate for KHL Medveščak Zagreb in the Kontinental Hockey League. He left the Croatian side upon the conclusion of the 2015-16 campaign and signed with the Schwenninger Wild Wings of the German top-flight Deutsche Eishockey Liga (DEL) in June 2016.

After 7 professional seasons, Gysbers announced his retirement on May 17, 2017.

== Personal life ==
Son of Andy and Wendy Gysbers. Simon majored in management. Also, he graduated Cardinal Carter Catholic High School in 2005.

== Career statistics ==
			Regular season					Playoffs
Season	Team	League	GP	G	A	Pts	PIM	GP	G	A	Pts	PIM
2003–04	Stouffville Spirit	OPJHL	42	3	10	13	37	—	—	—	—	—
2004–05	Stouffville Spirit	OPJHL	46	11	23	34	32	—	—	—	—	—
2005–06	Stouffville Spirit	OPJHL	46	8	24	32	94	—	—	—	—	—
2006–07	Lake Superior State University	CCHA	41	4	9	13	45	—	—	—	—	—
2007–08	Lake Superior State University	CCHA	37	6	13	19	46	—	—	—	—	—
2008–09	Lake Superior State University	CCHA	39	3	18	21	28	—	—	—	—	—
2009–10	Lake Superior State University	CCHA	38	6	9	15	46	—	—	—	—	—
2009–10	Toronto Marlies	AHL	14	0	1	1	2	—	—	—	—	—
2010–11	Toronto Marlies	AHL	60	7	24	31	32	—	—	—	—	—
2011–12	Toronto Marlies	AHL	68	5	24	29	20	17	1	1	2	8
2012–13	Toronto Marlies	AHL	54	4	15	19	36	—	—	—	—	—
2013–14	Ilves	Liiga	58	6	18	24	63	—	—	—	—	—
2014–15	TPS	Liiga	44	3	14	17	52	—	—	—	—	—
2014–15	Djurgårdens IF	SHL	10	2	4	6	0	2	0	0	0	4
2015–16	KHL Medveščak Zagreb	KHL	42	4	6	10	28	—	—	—	—	—
2016–17	Schwenninger Wild Wings	DEL	52	5	15	20	44	—	—	—	—	—
AHL totals			196	16	64	80	90	17	1	1	2	8
