= Adam Naglich =

American ice hockey player (born 1984)

- Born: May 9, 1984 (age 41) Las Vegas, Nevada, U.S.
- Height: 6 ft 1 in (185 cm)
- Weight: 182 lb (83 kg; 13 st 0 lb)
- Position: Right Wing
- Shot: Right
- Played for: Bakersfield Condors; KHL Medveščak; Alba Volán Székesfehérvár; Vienna Capitals
- NHL draft: Undrafted
- Playing career: 2009–2015

Adam Naglich (born May 9, 1984) is an American former professional ice hockey player who last played for the Vienna Capitals of the Austrian Hockey League (EBEL).

Undrafted, Naglich began his professional career with the Bakersfield Condors of the ECHL in the 2009–10 season before opting to pursue a European career in the EBEL. He has formerly played with Croatian club, KHL Medveščak and Hungarian club, Alba Volán Székesfehérvár in the EBEL before joining the Vienna Capitals on a one-year contract on August 2, 2014.

At the conclusion of the 2014–15 season with the Vienna Capitals, Naglich retired from professional hockey at returned to settle in his hometown Las Vegas, Nevada.

== Career statistics ==
			Regular season					Playoffs
Season	Team	League	GP	G	A	Pts	PIM	GP	G	A	Pts	PIM
2002–03	Victoria Salsa	BCHL	59	14	24	38	57	—	—	—	—	—
2003–04	Victoria Salsa	BCHL	59	28	33	61	48	5	2	2	4	6
2004–05	Victoria Salsa	BCHL	60	20	26	46	56	5	2	4	6	6
2005–06	University of Alaska Fairbanks	NCAA	33	5	3	8	38	—	—	—	—	—
2006–07	University of Alaska Fairbanks	NCAA	39	6	14	20	24	—	—	—	—	—
2007–08	University of Alaska Fairbanks	NCAA	35	3	16	19	22	—	—	—	—	—
2008–09	University of Alaska Fairbanks	NCAA	38	9	7	16	26	—	—	—	—	—
2009–10	Bakersfield Condors	ECHL	69	16	23	39	81	10	1	4	5	10
2010–11	Bakersfield Condors	ECHL	67	17	29	46	32	4	0	1	1	0
2011–12	Medvescak Zagreb	EBEL	49	14	18	32	38	9	1	1	2	35
2011–12	Medvescak Zagreb II	Croatia	—	—	—	—	—	3	3	1	4	4
2012–13	Medvescak Zagreb	EBEL	52	10	28	38	55	6	0	5	5	4
2012–13	Medvescak Zagreb II	Croatia	—	—	—	—	—	3	2	3	5	6
2013–14	Fehérvár AV19	EBEL	52	17	24	41	52	4	1	1	2	2
2014–15	Vienna Capitals	EBEL	21	4	1	5	8	—	—	—	—	—
ECHL totals			136	33	52	85	113	14	1	5	6	10
EBEL totals			174	45	71	116	153	19	2	7	9	41
