= Chad Johnson (ice hockey) =

Canadian ice hockey player (born 1986)

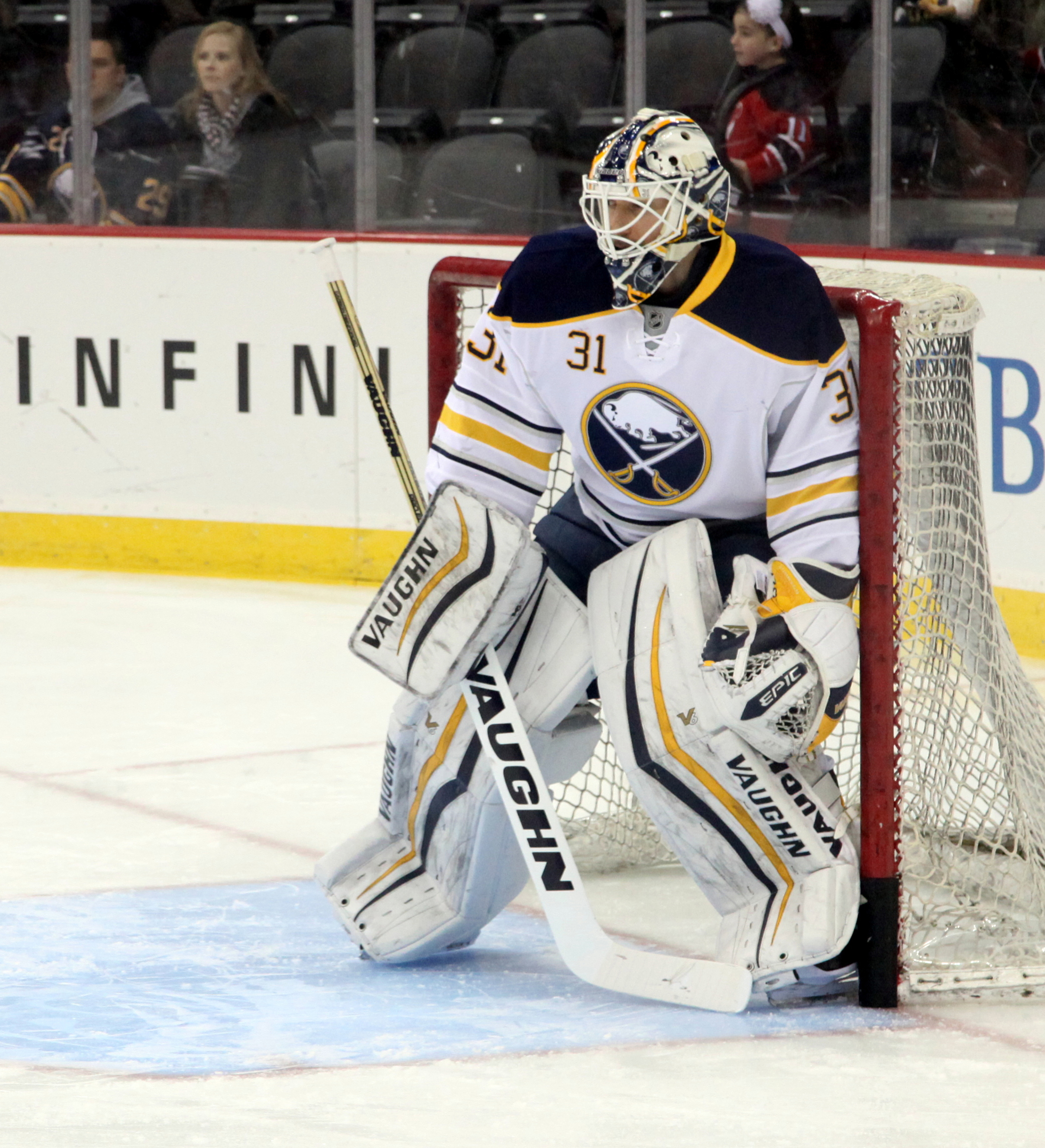
- Johnson with the Buffalo Sabres in 2016
- Born: June 10, 1986 (age 40) Saskatoon, Saskatchewan, Canada
- Height: 6 ft 3 in (191 cm)
- Weight: 196 lb (89 kg; 14 st 0 lb)
- Position: Goaltender
- Caught: Left
- Played for: New York Rangers; Phoenix Coyotes; Boston Bruins; New York Islanders; Buffalo Sabres; Calgary Flames; St. Louis Blues; Anaheim Ducks
- National team: Canada
- NHL draft: 125th overall, 2006; Pittsburgh Penguins
- Playing career: 2009–2019

Chad Terry Johnson (born June 10, 1986) is a Canadian former professional ice hockey goaltender. He most recently played for the Anaheim Ducks of the National Hockey League (NHL). He was selected in the fifth round, 125th overall by the Pittsburgh Penguins in the 2006 NHL entry draft.

== Playing career ==
=== College ===
Johnson played college ice hockey for the University of Alaska Fairbanks (Nanooks). He was drafted by the Pittsburgh Penguins 125th overall in the National Hockey League's (NHL) 2006 Entry Draft. During his senior year, he was the Central Collegiate Hockey Association Player of the Year, as well as a Hobey Baker Award finalist.

=== Professional ===
==== New York Rangers ====
After graduating, on June 27, 2009, Johnson was traded to the New York Rangers in exchange for a fifth-round pick (151st overall) in the 2009 NHL entry draft. He began his professional career in the 2009–10 season with the Rangers American Hockey League affiliate, the Hartford Wolf Pack. When the Rangers waived Stephen Valiquette to Hartford on December 2, Johnson was recalled to serve as a backup goaltender to Henrik Lundqvist. He made his NHL debut against the Philadelphia Flyers on December 30, 2009, when he replaced Lundqvist after the first period. He allowed a breakaway goal to Simon Gagné on the first shot he faced, after playing for 23 seconds. He finished the game with 17 saves on 20 shots over two periods. He played his first career start against the Atlanta Thrashers and lost 2–1 in overtime.

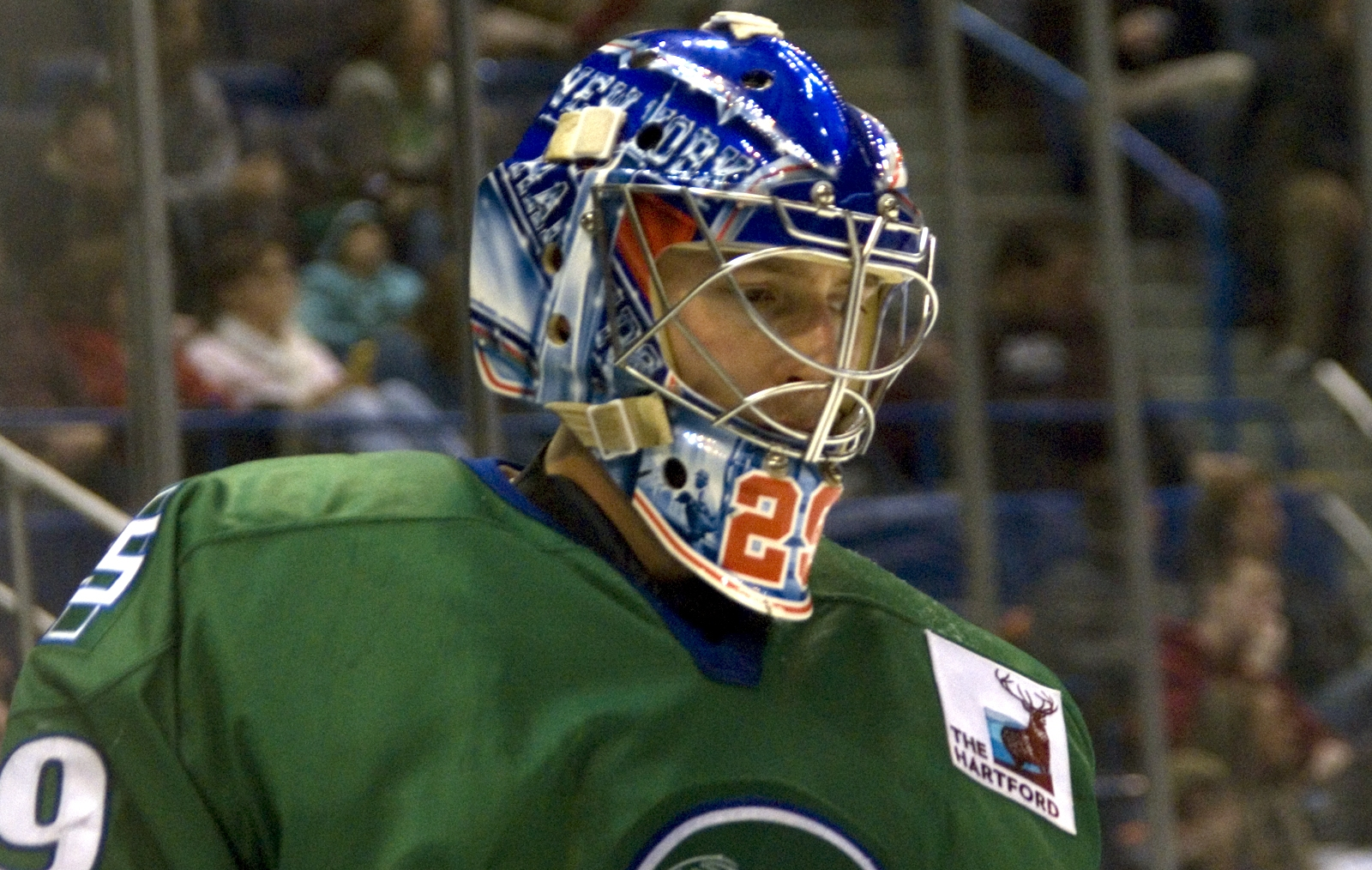
Johnson while playing for the Connecticut Whale

==== Phoenix Coyotes ====
After spending three years with the Rangers' American Hockey League (AHL) affiliate club Hartford Wolf Pack/Connecticut Whale, and playing in six NHL games, Johnson became an unrestricted free agent. He signed with the Phoenix Coyotes for a one-year, two-way contract and assigned to the AHL's Portland Pirates.

At the beginning of the lock-out shortened 2012–13 season, starting goaltender Mike Smith suffered a lower body injury. Johnson was called up to provide backup to Jason LaBarbera. After spending two games as a backup, on January 28, 2013, Johnson was called on to start in goal against the Nashville Predators. In his first NHL start since January 31, 2010, seventh overall, he earned first star accolades by stopping all 21 shots he faced on his way to his first NHL career shutout.

==== Boston Bruins ====
On July 5, 2013, Johnson was signed as a free agent to a one-year contract with the Boston Bruins. Johnson was the team's backup goaltender, behind Tuukka Rask, marking his first full-time NHL job.

==== New York Islanders ====
On July 1, 2014, Johnson was signed as a free agent to a two-year, $2.6 million contract with the New York Islanders. During his time with the club, Johnson posted an (8–8–1) record.

==== Buffalo Sabres ====
On March 2, 2015, he was traded along with a draft pick to the Buffalo Sabres in exchange for Michal Neuvirth., but he did not play for the Sabres until the 2015–16 season.

On December 17, 2015, Johnson recorded a 44-save shutout, breaking the Sabres franchise record for most saves in a regular season shutout, which had been held by Ryan Miller.

==== Calgary Flames ====
As a free agent from the Sabres, on July 1, 2016, Johnson joined his sixth NHL club in signing a one-year contract with the Calgary Flames. Johnson began the 2016–17 season, initially serving Brian Elliott as the backup, before he was elevated to shared starts through the midpoint of the year. Johnson would later return to his backup status in completing the season with 18 wins in 36 games. Johnson made his first NHL playoff appearance in Game 4 of the Stanley Cup Playoffs against the Anaheim Ducks, in relief of Elliot. The Flames would lose the game, 3–1, and get swept out of the playoffs.

On June 17, 2017, Johnson was as an impending free agent was traded back to former club, the Arizona Coyotes, in the Flames acquisition of Mike Smith. Included in the trade largely for 2017 NHL Expansion Draft considerations, he was dealt alongside prospect Brandon Hickey and a conditional 3rd round pick.

==== Return to Buffalo ====
Johnson went to market as a free agent from the Coyotes, and promptly signed a one-year, $2.5 million contract for a second stint with the Buffalo Sabres on July 1, 2017. In the 2017–18 season, Johnson was unable to replicate his previous season with club, in winning just 10 of 36 games, he was unable to steer the Sabres from a last place finish in the league.

==== St. Louis Blues and Anaheim Ducks ====
On July 1, 2018, Johnson opted to move on from the Sabres and agreed to a one-year, $1.75 million contract with the St. Louis Blues. In the 2018–19 season, Johnson as the club's backup to Jake Allen, appeared in 10 games as the Blues struggled to start the campaign. After collecting just two wins, Johnson was placed on waivers by the Blues and was claimed by the Anaheim Ducks on December 11, 2018.

== Career statistics ==
=== Regular season and playoffs ===
			Regular season									Playoffs
Season	Team	League	GP	W	L	OTL	MIN	GA	SO	GAA	SV%	GP	W	L	MIN	GA	SO	GAA	SV%
2003–04	Brooks Bandits	AJHL	31	6	20	3	1782	117	0	3.94	—	—	—	—	—	—	—	—	—
2004–05	Brooks Bandits	AJHL	42	25	16	2	2,505	109	2	2.61	.923	9	4	5	493	—	—	—	—
2005–06	University of Alaska-Fairbanks	CCHA	18	6	7	4	985	42	0	2.56	.917	—	—	—	—	—	—	—	—
2006–07	University of Alaska-Fairbanks	CCHA	19	5	6	2	1002	52	1	3.11	.883	—	—	—	—	—	—	—	—
2007–08	University of Alaska-Fairbanks	CCHA	7	0	6	0	357	20	0	3.36	.893	—	—	—	—	—	—	—	—
2008–09	University of Alaska-Fairbanks	CCHA	35	14	16	5	2062	57	6	1.66	.940	—	—	—	—	—	—	—	—
2009–10	Hartford Wolf Pack	AHL	44	24	18	2	2649	112	3	2.54	.911	—	—	—	—	—	—	—	—
2009–10	New York Rangers	NHL	5	1	2	1	281	11	0	2.35	.919	—	—	—	—	—	—	—	—
2010–11	Hartford Wolf Pack/CT Whale	AHL	40	16	19	3	2271	103	2	2.72	.901	—	—	—	—	—	—	—	—
2010–11	New York Rangers	NHL	1	0	0	0	20	2	0	6.00	.818	—	—	—	—	—	—	—	—
2011–12	Connecticut Whale	AHL	49	22	18	6	2775	115	1	2.49	.919	—	—	—	—	—	—	—	—
2012–13	Portland Pirates	AHL	34	16	15	1	1937	97	2	3.00	.903	3	0	3	204	12	0	3.53	.898
2012–13	Phoenix Coyotes	NHL	4	2	0	2	247	5	1	1.21	.954	—	—	—	—	—	—	—	—
2013–14	Boston Bruins	NHL	27	17	4	3	1511	53	2	2.10	.925	—	—	—	—	—	—	—	—
2014–15	New York Islanders	NHL	19	8	8	1	1053	54	0	3.08	.889	—	—	—	—	—	—	—	—
2015–16	Buffalo Sabres	NHL	45	22	16	4	2592	102	1	2.36	.920	—	—	—	—	—	—	—	—
2016–17	Calgary Flames	NHL	36	18	15	1	2013	87	3	2.59	.910	1	0	1	52	1	0	1.16	.952
2017–18	Buffalo Sabres	NHL	36	10	16	3	1774	105	0	3.55	.891	—	—	—	—	—	—	—	—
2018–19	St. Louis Blues	NHL	10	2	6	0	491	29	1	3.54	.884	—	—	—	—	—	—	—	—
2018–19	Anaheim Ducks	NHL	9	0	5	0	320	20	0	3.75	.872	—	—	—	—	—	—	—	—
NHL totals			192	80	72	15	10,299	468	8	2.73	.907	1	0	1	52	1	0	1.16	.952

Medal record

Representing Canada

Ice hockey

World Championships
Silver medal – second place	2017 Germany/France	

=== International ===
Year	Team	Event	Result	GP	W	L	T/OTL	MIN	GA	SO	GAA	SV%
2010	Canada	WC	7th	3	0	0	0	73	1	0	0.82	.964
2017	Canada	WC	2nd place, silver medalist(s)	3	3	0	0	180	4	1	1.33	.917
Senior totals				6	3	0	0	253	5	1	1.18	.932

== Awards and honours ==
Award	Year
College
All-CCHA First Team	2008–09
CCHA Player of the Year	2008–09
AHCA West Second-Team All-American	2008–09

Awards and achievements
Preceded by Jeff Zatkoff	CCHA Best Goaltender; 2008–09	Succeeded by Cody Reichard
Preceded by Kevin Porter	CCHA Player of the Year; 2008–09	Succeeded by Cody Reichard
Preceded by Kevin Porter	Perani Cup winner 2008–09	Succeeded by Drew Palmisano
