= David Brown (ice hockey) =

Canadian ice hockey player (born 1985)

- Born: February 1, 1985 (age 41) Stoney Creek, Ontario, Canada
- Height: 6 ft 0 in (183 cm)
- Weight: 185 lb (84 kg; 13 st 3 lb)
- Position: Goaltender
- Caught: Right
- Played for: Fife Flyers; WBS Penguins; Grand Rapids Griffins; Hull Stingrays
- NHL draft: 228th overall, 2004; Pittsburgh Penguins
- Playing career: 2007–2018

David Brown (born February 1, 1985) is a Canadian former professional ice hockey goaltender. He most recently played for the Fife Flyers of the Elite Ice Hockey League (EIHL). Brown was drafted by the Pittsburgh Penguins in the 8th round, 228th overall, in the 2004 NHL entry draft.

== Playing career ==
Brown was originally drafted from the Kilty Bees. Brown progressed through the Hamilton minor hockey ranks to the Provincial A Kilty Bees, and was eventually drafted by the Mississauga Ice Dogs of the OHL (Ontario Hockey League), where he was their fifth round selection in the 2001 draft. Once Brown finished his junior career, he eventually moved on to the University of Notre Dame.

Before turning professional, Brown played four seasons for the Notre Dame Fighting Irish, and was named MVP in 2006. He was a finalist for the 2007 Hobey Baker Award, which is awarded to the top collegiate player in the country. On July 3, 2007, Brown signed an entry-level contract with the Pittsburgh Penguins.

On February 18, 2011, the Toronto Marlies of the American Hockey League signed Brown to a professional tryout contract, although he never suited for the Marlies, Brown remained in the Central Hockey League with the Quad City Mallards, Arizona Sundogs, Allen Americans and the Wichita Thunder.

On July 5, 2014, Brown left the CHL and signed abroad on a two-year contract with the Hull Stingrays of the EIHL, during which he studied for his master's degree at the University of Hull.

Brown played for the Fife Flyers in the Elite Ice Hockey League for the 2015–16 season and last played for the Stoney Creek Generals in the 2018 ACH.

== Personal life ==
He is an alumnus of Bishop Ryan Catholic Secondary School in Hamilton, Ontario.

== Awards and honors ==
Award	Year
All-CCHA First Team	2006–07
AHCA West First-Team All-American	2006–07
CCHA All-Tournament Team	2007

Awards and achievements
Preceded by Charlie Effinger	CCHA Best Goaltender; 2006–07	Succeeded by Jeff Zatkoff
Preceded by Scott Parse	CCHA Player of the Year; 2006–07	Succeeded by Kevin Porter
Preceded by Jeff Lerg	CCHA Most Valuable Player in Tournament; 2007	Succeeded by Tim Miller
