= T. J. Hensick =

American ice hockey player (born 1985)

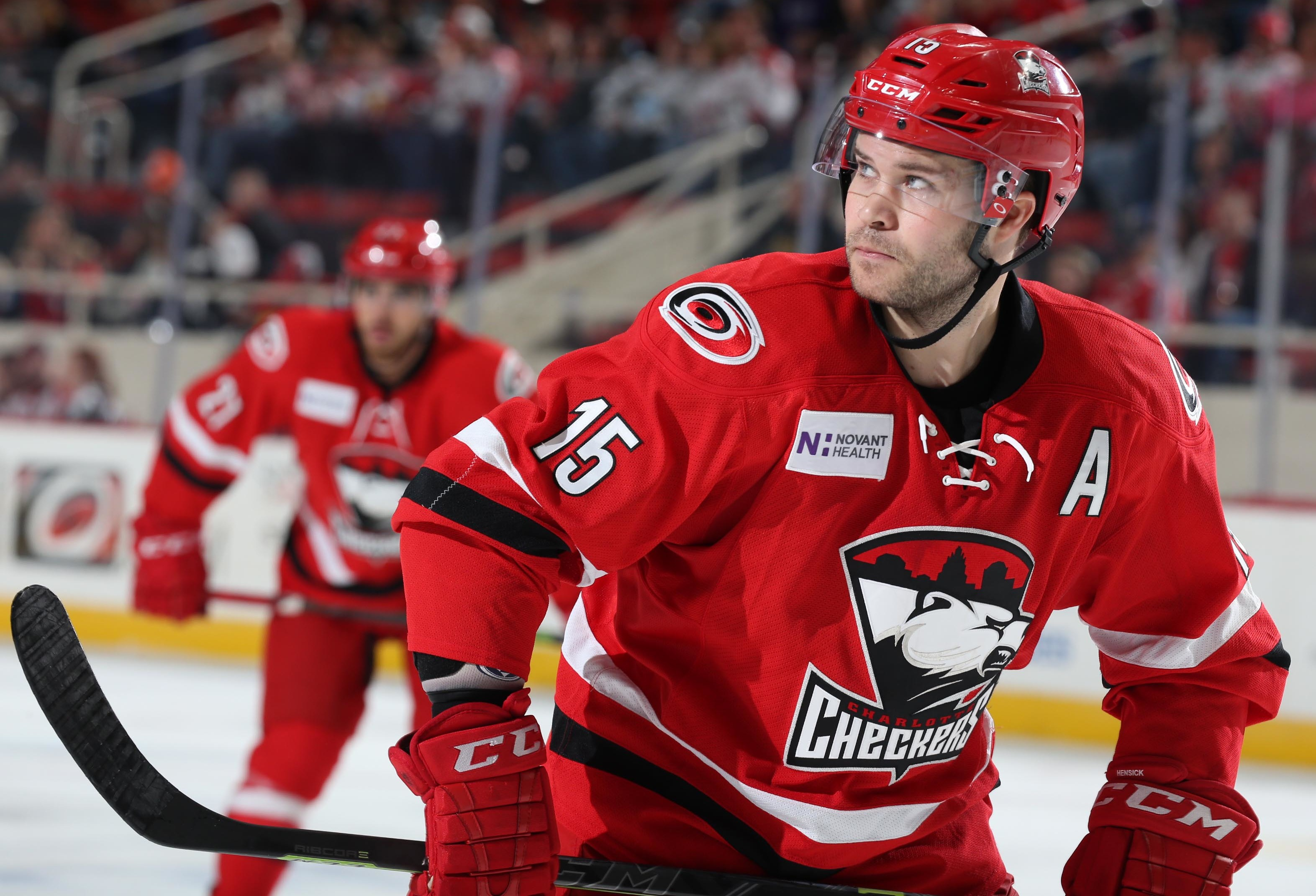
- Hensick with the Charlotte Checkers in 2016
- Born: December 10, 1985 (age 40) Howell, Michigan, U.S.
- Height: 5 ft 10 in (178 cm)
- Weight: 185 lb (84 kg; 13 st 3 lb)
- Position: Center
- Shot: Right
- Played for: Colorado Avalanche; St. Louis Blues; Modo Hockey
- NHL draft: 88th overall, 2005; Colorado Avalanche
- Playing career: 2007–2023

Timothy James Hensick (born December 10, 1985) is an American former professional ice hockey center. He played in the National Hockey League (NHL) with the Colorado Avalanche and St. Louis Blues. Hensick was drafted 88th overall in the 2005 NHL entry draft by the Avalanche.

== Playing career ==
As a youth, Hensick played in the 1999 Quebec International Pee-Wee Hockey Tournament with the Detroit Honeybaked minor ice hockey team. He later played with the United States National Development Program. He spent four years (2003–07) at University of Michigan playing collegiate ice hockey. Hensick had a league leading 69 points and 46 assists in the 2006–07 season, but was not among the three finalists for the Hobey Baker Award. He was, however, named in the NCAA All-American Team. Hensick scored 222 points in his collegiate career with the Wolverines. It proved to be the most by any player in the decade as Hensick was later honored, named in the First All-Decade Team.

After his senior year with the Wolverines, Hensick was signed by the Avalanche to a three-year entry-level contract on April 11, 2007. T.J. made his professional debut in the 2007–08 season with the Lake Erie Monsters of the AHL, the Avalanche's affiliate team. Hensick was called up to the Avalanche on November 29, 2007, and made his NHL debut in a 3-2 loss to the San Jose Sharks on November 30, 2007. Hensick, in his second game, scored his first NHL goal against the Los Angeles Kings in a 5-2 win on December 1, 2007. He was named as Lake Erie's only contribution to the 2008 AHL All-Star Game, playing for PlanetUSA, Hensick led the team with 2 goals and 2 assists in a 9-8 shoot-out loss to the Canadian All-Stars.

Hensick made the Avalanche opening roster to start the 2009–10 season. Reduced to a reserve forward, T.J. played in only 7 games before he was placed on waivers on November 25, 2009. After clearing waivers he was assigned to Lake Erie and lead the Monsters in scoring with 70 points. Hensick was named "AHL player of the Month" in December, becoming the first player to be awarded in Monsters history. T.J. was also selected to the 2010 AHL All-Star Game, replacing injured teammate Darren Haydar, as the lone Lake Erie representative.

On June 17, 2010, after he was unable to establish himself with the Avalanche, and in need of a new contract, he was traded to the St. Louis Blues for Julian Talbot. On July 14, 2010, Hensick agreed to a contract with the Blues signing a one-year two way contract. After attending the Blues training camp for the 2010–11 season, he was reassigned to AHL affiliate, the Peoria Rivermen, during the preseason. During the season, Hensick was recalled from the Rivermen to make his Blues debut, marking his 100th career NHL game in a defeat to the Detroit Red Wings on November 17, 2010. At the conclusion of the season, he participated in 13 games for the Blues, scoring 1 goal.

After his third consecutive season in leading the Rivermen in scoring within the Blues organization, Hensick left as a free agent to sign his first European contract on a one-year deal with Swedish club, Modo Hockey, of the Swedish Hockey League on June 13, 2013. After finally agreeing the transfer to Sweden from many years of interest with many clubs, Hensick failed to meet expectations producing just 4 goals and 11 assists in 31 games. After he was permitted a mutual release, Hensick returned to North America and signed an AHL contract with the Abbotsford Heat on January 11, 2014. Procedurally placed on waivers after participating in Europe, Hensick was immediately claimed by the Hartford Wolf Pack, an affiliate of the New York Rangers. Hensick continued where he left off in the AHL, producing offensively with 34 points in 42 games, as the Wolf Pack missed the playoffs.

On July 3, 2014, Hensick decided to continue in the AHL and signed as a free agent to a one-year contract with the Hamilton Bulldogs.

After two seasons without an NHL offer, on July 1, 2015, Hensick was signed to a one-year, two-way contract with the Carolina Hurricanes. Following the Hurricanes training camp, Hensick was familiarly assigned to the AHL to add his veteran presence to affiliate, the Charlotte Checkers. During the 2015–16 season with the Checkers, Hensick appeared in 46 games with the scoring at a lower pace then his career average in the AHL before he was loaned to the Utica Comets, affiliate to the Vancouver Canucks, in an exchange for Blair Jones on March 7, 2016. Hensick continued to produce offensively in his stint with the Comets, posting 15 points in 19 games.

On July 2, 2016, as a free agent Hensick was signed to a one-year AHL contract with the Los Angeles Kings affiliate, the Ontario Reign.

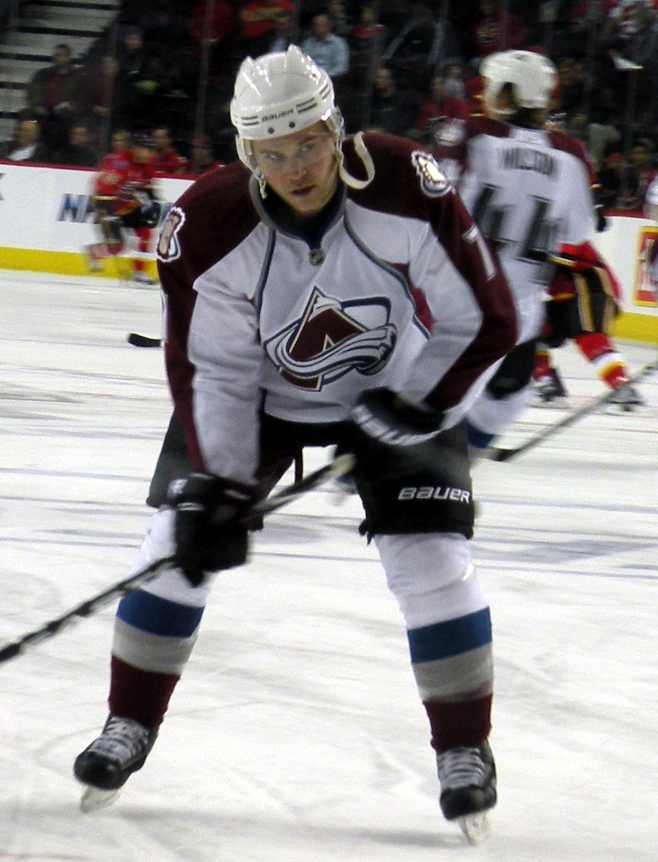
Hensick with the Colorado Avalanche in 2009.

Hensick played two seasons with the Reign, before leaving as a free agent following the 2017–18 season. Despite maintaining his scoring touch, Hensick was unable to secure an NHL or AHL contract, opting to continue his career by signing a one-year ECHL contract with the Toledo Walleye on October 8, 2018. In the midst of the 2018–19 season, Hensick tallied a league high 58 points through 47 games with the Walleye, before he returned to the AHL in securing a contract with the San Jose Barracuda on February 12, 2019. Hensick continued his career scoring pace in the AHL, posting 20 points through the final 23 regular season games.

In the following offseason, Hensick as a free agent returned to the Toledo Walleye of the ECHL on August 21, 2019. He was later announced as team captain leading into the 2019–20 season.

== Career statistics ==
=== Regular season and playoffs ===
			Regular season					Playoffs
Season	Team	League	GP	G	A	Pts	PIM	GP	G	A	Pts	PIM
2001–02	U.S. NTDP U17	USDP	17	10	5	15	—	—	—	—	—	—
2001–02	U.S. NTDP U18	NAHL	46	15	25	40	10	—	—	—	—	—
2002–03	U.S. NTDP U18	USDP	48	24	24	48	11	—	—	—	—	—
2002–03	U.S. NTDP U18	NAHL	10	6	7	13	0	—	—	—	—	—
2003–04	University of Michigan	CCHA	43	12	34	46	38	—	—	—	—	—
2004–05	University of Michigan	CCHA	39	23	32	55	24	—	—	—	—	—
2005–06	University of Michigan	CCHA	41	17	35	52	44	—	—	—	—	—
2006–07	University of Michigan	CCHA	41	23	46	69	38	—	—	—	—	—
2007–08	Lake Erie Monsters	AHL	50	12	33	45	18	—	—	—	—	—
2007–08	Colorado Avalanche	NHL	31	6	5	11	2	2	0	1	1	0
2008–09	Lake Erie Monsters	AHL	12	7	9	16	2	—	—	—	—	—
2008–09	Colorado Avalanche	NHL	61	4	17	21	14	—	—	—	—	—
2009–10	Colorado Avalanche	NHL	7	1	2	3	0	—	—	—	—	—
2009–10	Lake Erie Monsters	AHL	58	20	50	70	25	—	—	—	—	—
2010–11	Peoria Rivermen	AHL	59	21	48	69	27	4	2	1	3	2
2010–11	St. Louis Blues	NHL	13	1	2	3	2	—	—	—	—	—
2011–12	Peoria Rivermen	AHL	66	21	49	70	20	—	—	—	—	—
2012–13	Peoria Rivermen	AHL	76	19	48	67	50	—	—	—	—	—
2013–14	Modo Hockey	SHL	31	4	11	15	2	—	—	—	—	—
2013–14	Hartford Wolf Pack	AHL	42	11	23	34	0	—	—	—	—	—
2014–15	Hamilton Bulldogs	AHL	75	19	41	60	10	—	—	—	—	—
2015–16	Charlotte Checkers	AHL	46	7	18	25	8	—	—	—	—	—
2015–16	Utica Comets	AHL	19	2	13	15	4	4	1	1	2	0
2016–17	Ontario Reign	AHL	67	16	36	52	18	5	2	3	5	0
2017–18	Ontario Reign	AHL	60	11	34	45	12	4	1	0	1	0
2018–19	Toledo Walleye	ECHL	47	17	41	58	10	—	—	—	—	—
2018–19	San Jose Barracuda	AHL	23	6	14	20	0	4	1	2	3	0
2019–20	Toledo Walleye	ECHL	57	16	40	56	23	—	—	—	—	—
2021–22	Toledo Walleye	ECHL	65	22	56	78	24	21	10	18	28	6
2022–23	Toledo Walleye	ECHL	9	2	6	8	2	13	4	5	9	4
AHL totals			653	172	416	588	194	21	7	7	14	2
NHL totals			112	12	26	38	18	2	0	1	1	0

=== International ===
Year	Team	Event	GP	G	A	Pts	PIM
2002	United States	U17	6	4	2	6	0
2003	United States	WJC18	6	6	4	10	0
2005	United States	WJC	7	2	1	3	0
Junior totals			19	12	7	19	0

== Awards and honors ==
Award	Year
College
CCHA Rookie of the Year	2004
All-CCHA Rookie Team	2004
All-CCHA First Team	2004, 2005, 2007
CCHA Scoring Leader	2005, 2007
AHCA West First-Team All-American	2005, 2007
All-CCHA Second Team	2006
NCAA Scoring Leader	2007
CCHA All-Tournament Team	2007
AHL
All-Star Game	2008, 2010, 2011, 2012
Second All-Star Team	2012

Awards and achievements
Preceded by Jeff Tambellini	CCHA Rookie of the Year; 2003–04	Succeeded by Bill Thomas
Preceded by Ryan Potulny	NCAA Ice Hockey Scoring Champion; 2006–07	Succeeded by Nathan Gerbe
