= 2011 CCHA men's ice hockey tournament =

Sports tournament

2011 CCHA Men's ice hockey tournament
- Dates: March 4–19, 2011
- Teams: 11
- Finals site: Joe Louis Arena; Detroit, Michigan
- Champions: Miami (1st title)
- Winning coach: Enrico Blasi (1st title)
- MVP: Andy Miele (Miami)
- CCHA Men's Ice Hockey Tournaments

The 2011 CCHA Men's Ice Hockey Tournament is the 40th CCHA Men's Ice Hockey Tournament. It was played between March 4 and March 19, 2011, at campus locations and at Joe Louis Arena in Detroit, Michigan. The Miami Redhawks won the tournament and was awarded the Mason Cup. They earned the Central Collegiate Hockey Association's automatic bid to the 2011 NCAA Division I Men's Ice Hockey Tournament.

== Format ==
The tournament features four rounds of play. In the first round, the sixth and eleventh, seventh and tenth, and eighth and ninth seeds as determined by the final regular season standings play a best-of-three series, with the winners advancing to the quarterfinals. There, the first seed and lowest-ranked first-round winner, the second seed and second-lowest-ranked first-round winner, the third seed and second-highest-ranked first-round winner, and the fourth seed and the fifth seed play a best-of-three series, with the winners advancing to the semifinals. In the semifinals, the highest and lowest seeds and second-highest and second-lowest seeds play a single game, with the winner advancing to the championship game and the loser advancing to the third-place game. The tournament champion receives an automatic bid to the 2011 NCAA Men's Division I Ice Hockey Tournament.

=== Regular season standings ===
Note: GP = Games played; W = Wins; L = Losses; T = Ties; PTS = Points; GF = Goals For; GA = Goals Against

2010–11 Central Collegiate Hockey Association standings
	Conference								Overall					
	GP	W	L	T	SW	PTS	GF	GA	GP	W	L	T	GF	GA
#3 Michigan †	28	20	7	1	0	61	92	57	44	29	11	4	146	98
#4 Notre Dame	28	18	7	3	2	59	95	69	44	25	14	5	151	121
#8 Miami*	28	16	7	5	2	55	103	58	39	23	10	6	146	85
#13 Western Michigan	28	10	9	9	5	44	77	71	42	19	13	10	116	104
Ferris State	28	12	12	4	4	43	59	62	39	18	16	5	94	86
Northern Michigan	28	12	13	3	0	39	61	87	39	15	19	5	91	117
Alaska	28	0^	28^	0^	0^	38	64	66	38	0^	38^	0^	89	91
Lake Superior State	28	8	12	8	5	37	59	78	39	13	17	9	93	115
Ohio State	28	10	14	4	2	36	66	72	37	15	18	4	95	92
Michigan State	28	11	15	2	0	35	65	75	38	15	19	4	98	107
Bowling Green	28	3	21	4	2	15	41	87	41	10	27	4	74	123
Championship: Miami † Conference regular season champion * Conference tournament champion Rankings: USCHO.com/CBS College Sports Top 20 Poll^ Alaska was retroactively required to forfeit all wins and loses due to player ineligibilities.

== Bracket ==
First round March 4–6
8	Lake Superior State	4	3	—
9	Ohio State	0	2	—
6	Northern Michigan	6	0	1
11	Bowling Green	3	2	2**
7	Alaska	3*	4**	—
10	Michigan State	2	3	—

Quarterfinals; March 11–13
1	Michigan	5	4	—
11	Bowling Green	1	1	—
4	Western Michigan	1	3	5*
5	Ferris State	3	1	4
3	Miami	4	4	—
7	Alaska	1	1	—
2	Notre Dame	3*	3	4
8	Lake Superior State	2	4	2

Semifinals; March 18
1	Michigan	2
4	Western Michigan	5
3	Miami	6
2	Notre Dame	2

Championship; March 19
4	Western Michigan	2
3	Miami	5
Third place
1	Michigan	4
2	Notre Dame	2

Note: * denotes overtime period(s)

=== First round ===
==== (6) Northern Michigan vs. (11) Bowling Green ====
March 4	Northern Michigan	6 – 3	Bowling Green	Berry Events Center	Recap
Tyler Gron – pp – 15:45; Stephan Vigier – pp – 16:27		First period	Mike Fink – pp – 07:03
Erik Higby – 05:12; Brian Nugent – 06:01; Stephan Vigier – 08:38		Second period	Cameron Sinclair – 06:32; Bryce Williamson – pp – 09:04
Justin Florek – en – 18:01		Third period	No scoring
Reid Ellingson – ( 25 saves / 28 shots )		Goalie stats	Andrew Hammond – ( 21 saves / 25 shots ) Nick Eno – ( 15 saves / 16 shots )

March 5	Northern Michigan	0 – 2	Bowling Green	Berry Events Center	Recap
No scoring		First period	No scoring
No scoring		Second period	Jordan Samuels-Thomas – 07:44
No scoring		Third period	Ryan Viselli – en – 18:57
Reid Ellingson – ( 18 saves / 19 shots )		Goalie stats	Andrew Hammond – ( 29 saves / 29 shots )

March 6	Northern Michigan	1 – 2	2OT	Bowling Green	Berry Events Center	Recap
No scoring		First period		No scoring
No scoring		Second period		Chad Sumsion – 18:25
Andrew Cherniwchan – 06:40		Third period		No scoring
No scoring		Second overtime period		Bryce Williamson – 00:34
Reid Ellingson – ( 32 saves / 34 shots )		Goalie stats		Andrew Hammond – ( 44 saves / 45 shots )

Bowling Green wins series 2–1

==== (7) Alaska vs. (10) Michigan State ====
March 4	Alaska	3 – 2	OT	Michigan State	Carlson Center	Recap
No scoring		First period		No scoring
Michael Quinn – 17:07		Second period		Jake Chelios – pp – 08:07
Jarret Granberg – 12:45		Third period		Tim Buttery – 08:26
Nik Yaremchuk – 19:40		First overtime period		No scoring
Scott Greenham – ( 23 saves / 25 shots )		Goalie stats		Drew Palmisano – ( 34 saves / 37 shots )

March 5	Alaska	4 – 3	2OT	Michigan State	Carlson Center	Recap
Andy Taranto – pp – 07:54		First period		Dean Chelios – 15:43; Dustin Gazley – pp – 17:12
Derek Klassen – 12:46; Cody Kunyk – pp – 15:59		Second period		Brett Perlini – 19:19
No scoring		Third period		No scoring
Nik Yaremchuk – 03:18		Second overtime period		No scoring
Scott Greenham – ( 33 saves / 36 shots )		Goalie stats		Will Yanakeff – ( 30 saves / 34 shots )

Alaska wins series 2–0

==== (8) Lake Superior vs. (9) Ohio State ====
March 4	Lake Superior	4 – 0	Ohio State	Taffy Abel Arena	Recap
Dan Radke – 07:05		First period	No scoring
No scoring		Second period	No scoring
Kellan Lain – 09:44; Rick Schofield – en – 18:21; Nick McParland – en – 19:20		Third period	No scoring
Kevin Kapalka – ( 48 saves / 48 shots )		Goalie stats	Cal Heeter – ( 36 saves / 38 shots )

March 5	Lake Superior	3 – 2	Ohio State	Taffy Abel Arena	Recap
Ben Power – pp – 11:15		First period	No scoring
Will Acton – 06:14; Rick Schofield – pp – 19:32		Second period	No scoring
No scoring		Third period	Sergio Somma – 02:59; Danny Dries – 05:47
Kevin Kapalka – ( 28 saves / 30 shots )		Goalie stats	Cal Heeter – ( 31 saves / 34 shots )

Lake Superior wins series 2–0

=== Quarterfinals ===
==== (1) Michigan vs. (11) Bowling Green ====
March 11	Michigan	5 – 1	Bowling Green	Yost Ice Arena	Recap
David Wohlberg – 09:54; Chris Brown – pp – 12:25		First period	No scoring
Scooter Vaughan – 13:27		Second period	No scoring
Lindsay Sparks – 00:42; Luke Moffatt – 12:05		Third period	Bryce Williamson – 04:27
Shawn Hunwick – ( 23 saves / 24 shots )		Goalie stats	Andrew Hammond – ( 36 saves / 41 shots )

March 12	Michigan	4 – 1	Bowling Green	Yost Ice Arena	Recap
Lee Moffie – sh – 07:28		First period	No scoring
Lindsay Sparks – 14:05; Lee Moffie – pp – 18:27		Second period	No scoring
A.J. Treais – pp – 01:12		Third period	Camden Wojtala – 10:10
Shawn Hunwick – ( 12 saves / 12 shots ) Bryan Hogan – ( 6 saves / 7 shots ) Adam Janecyk – ( 1 saves / 1 shots )		Goalie stats	Andrew Hammond – ( 30 saves / 34 shots ) Nick Eno – ( 1 saves / 1 shots )

Michigan Wins Series 2–0

==== (2) Notre Dame vs. (8) Lake Superior ====
March 11	Notre Dame	3 – 2	OT	Lake Superior	Joyce Center Rink	Recap
T.J. Tynan – pp – 06:48		First period		No scoring
Anders Lee – 17:42		Second period		Chad Nehring – pp – 09:28; Rick Schofield – 11:14
No scoring		Third period		No scoring
Jeff Costello – 04:52		First overtime period		No scoring
Mike Johnson – ( 24 saves / 26 shots )		Goalie stats		Kevin Kapalka – ( 34 saves / 37 shots )

March 12	Notre Dame	3 – 4	Lake Superior	Joyce Center Rink	Recap
T. J. Tynan – 09:12; Nick Larson – 10:12		First period	Kellan Lain – pp – 18:37
Calle Ridderwall – 16:30		Second period	Fred Cassiani – 16:07; Chad Nehring – 18:55
No scoring		Third period	Fred Cassiani – 07:40
Mike Johnson – ( 35 saves / 39 shots )		Goalie stats	Kevin Kapalka – ( 37 saves / 40 shots )

Series Tied 1–1

==== (3) Miami vs. (7) Alaska ====
March 11	Miami	4 – 1	Alaska	Steve Cady Arena	Recap
No scoring		First period	Bryant Molle – 10:02
Chris Wideman – pp – 05:06		Second period	No scoring
Patrick Tiesling – 03:15; Andy Miele – 11:11; Reilly Smith – 17:35		Third period	No scoring
Cody Reichard – ( 17 saves / 18 shots )		Goalie stats	Scott Greenham – ( 32 saves / 36 shots )

March 12	Miami	4 – 1	Alaska	Steve Cady Arena	Recap
Cameron Schilling – 13:23		First period	Chad Gehon – 04:31
Andy Miele – 00:16; Vincent LoVerde – sh – 09:59; Reilly Smith – pp – 11:29		Second period	No scoring
No scoring		Third period	No scoring
Connor Knapp – ( 14 saves / 15 shots )		Goalie stats	Scott Greenham – ( 32 saves / 36 shots )

Miami Wins Series 2–0

==== (4) Western Michigan vs. (5) Ferris State ====
March 11	Western Michigan	1 – 3	Ferris State	Lawson Arena	Recap
No scoring		First period	Cory Kane – 11:31
Mike Leone – 05:21		Second period	Travis Ouellette – pp – 16:30
No scoring		Third period	Travis Ouellette – en – 19:21
Jerry Kuhn – ( 26 saves / 28 shots )		Goalie stats	Pat Nagle – ( 31 saves / 32 shots )

March 12	Western Michigan	3 – 1	Ferris State	Lawson Arena	Recap
No scoring		First period	No scoring
Shane Berschbach – 10:00; Danny DeKeyser – pp – 15:14		Second period	Mike Fillinger – 17:02
Trevor Elias – en – 19:05		Third period	No scoring
Jerry Kuhn – ( 30 saves / 31 shots )		Goalie stats	Pat Nagle – ( 28 saves / 30 shots )

Series Tied 1–1

=== Semifinals ===
==== (1) Michigan vs. (4) Western Michigan ====
March 18	Michigan	2 – 5	Western Michigan	Joe Louis Arena	Recap
No scoring		First period	Mike Leone (5) – pp – 09:25
Lee Moffie (7) – pp – 14:21		Second period	Dane Walters (8) – pp – 06:28; Matt Tennyson (9) – pp – 13:53; Derek Roehl (3) – 15:01; Kyle O'Kane (6) – 17:27
Lindsay Sparks (4) – 08:33		Third period	No scoring
Shawn Hunwick – (18 saves / 23 shots); Bryan Hogan – (4 saves / 4 shots)		Goalie stats	Jerry Kuhn – (29 saves / 31 shots)

==== (2) Notre Dame vs. (3) Miami ====
March 18	Notre Dame	2 – 6	Miami	Joe Louis Arena	Recap
No scoring		First period	Carter Camper (18) – pp – 04:52; Bryon Paulazzo (2) – 05:53; Alden Hirschfeld (12) – pp – 09:47; Carter Camper (19) – sh – 13:32
Billy Maday (8) – pp – 06:46; Calle Ridderwall (14) – 18:05		Second period	Andy Miele (22) – 12:01
No scoring		Third period	Andy Miele (23) – 03:35
Mike Johnson – ( 12 saves / 16 shots ) Steven Summerhays – ( 6 saves / 6 shots )		Goalie stats	Cody Reichard – ( 25 saves / 27 shots )

=== Third place ===
==== (1) Michigan vs. (2) Notre Dame ====
March 19	Michigan	4 – 2	Notre Dame	Joe Louis Arena	Recap
Louie Caporusso (10) – pp – 16:07; Carl Hagelin (18) – 16:22		First period	Riley Sheahan (5) – 04:34
No scoring		Second period	No scoring
Jeff Rohrkemper (2) – 04:37; Luke Glendening (8) – en – 19:55		Third period	T.J. Tynan (22) – 18:38
Shawn Hunwick – ( 42 saves / 44 shots )		Goalie stats	Steven Summerhays – ( 19 saves / 22 shots )

=== Championship ===
==== (3) Miami vs. (4) Western Michigan ====
March 19	Miami	5 – 2	Western Michigan	Joe Louis Arena	Recap
Bryon Paulazzo (3) – 12:03; Reilly Smith (27) – pp – 18:53		First period	No scoring
No scoring		Second period	Mike Leone (6) – pp – 18:22
Andy Miele (24) – 08:13; Curtis McKenzie (7) – pp – 10:10; Reilly Smith (28) – 16:30		Third period	Dane Walters (9) – pp – 02:38
Cody Reichard – ( 14 saves / 16 shots )		Goalie stats	Jerry Kuhn – ( 30 saves / 35 shots )

== All-Tournament Team ==
- F Dane Walters (Western Michigan)
- F Reilly Smith (Miami)
- F Andy Miele* (Miami)
- D Danny DeKeyser (Western Michigan)
- D Will Weber (Miami)
- G Cody Reichard (Miami)

* Most Valuable Player(s)
