= Dries (given name) =

Dries is a Dutch masculine given name, the short version of Andries (see Andre, Andrew) and may refer to:

- Dries van Agt (1931-2024), Dutch politician
- Dries Boussatta (born 1972), Dutch footballer
- Dries Buytaert (born 1978), Belgian computer programmer
- Dries Devenyns (born 1983), Belgian cyclist
- Dries Holten (1936–2020), Dutch singer, songwriter
- Dries van der Lof (1919-1990), Dutch racecar driver
- Dries Mertens (born 1987), Belgian football striker
- Dries van Noten (born 1958), Belgian fashion designer
- Dries Roelvink (born 1959), Dutch singer
- Dries De Bondt (born 1991), Belgian cyclist
- Dries Van Langenhove (born 1993), Flemish nationalist
- Dries Vanthoor (born 1998), Belgian racecar driver

== See also ==
- Dan Dries, American ice hockey player
- Marcel Dries (1929–2011), Belgian football player
- Sheldon Dries, American ice hockey player
