= Cody Reichard =

American ice hockey player

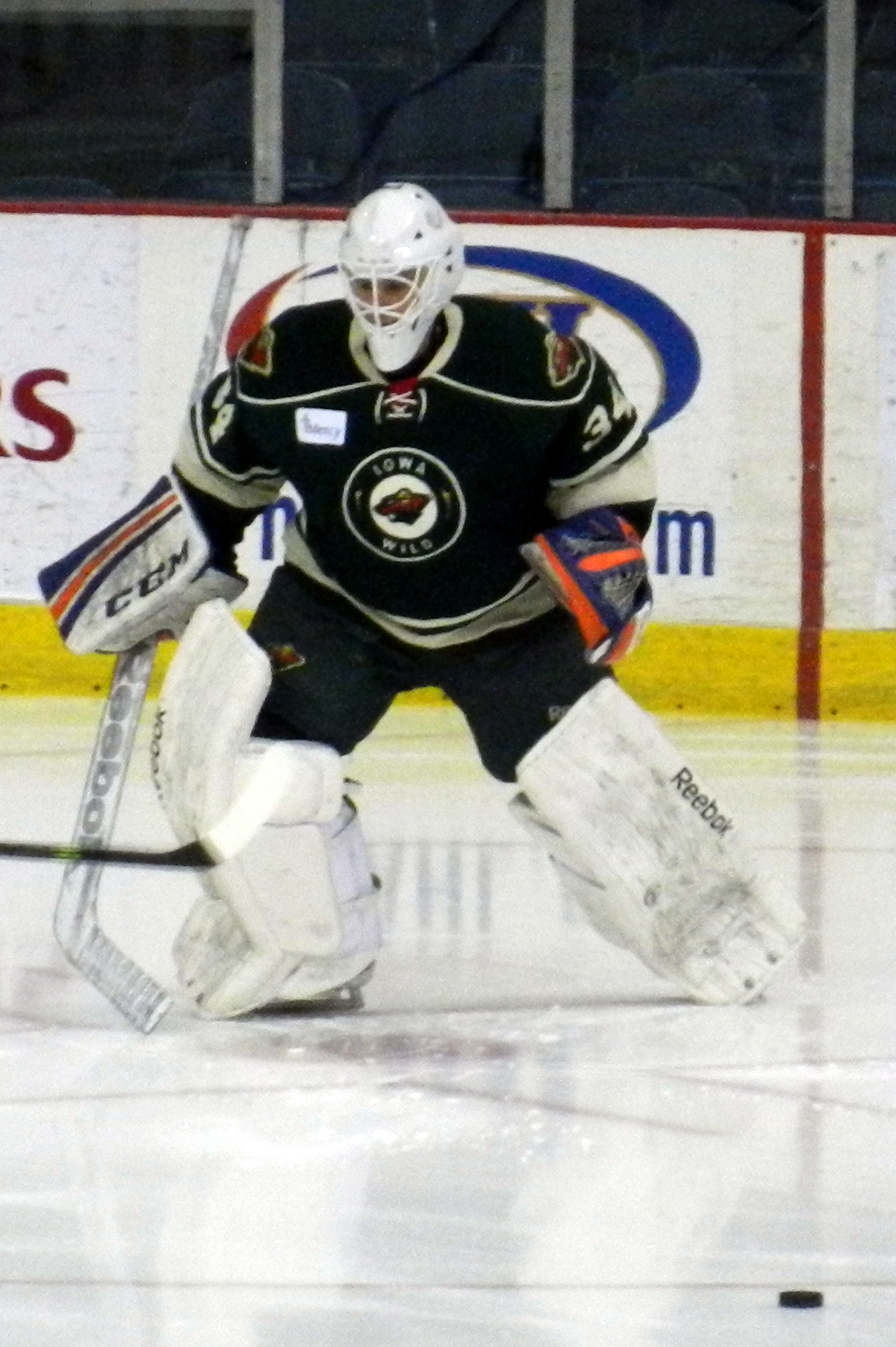
- Born: February 18, 1987 (age 38); Celina, Ohio, U.S.
- Height: 5 ft 11 in (180 cm)
- Weight: 165 lb (75 kg; 11 st 11 lb)
- Position: Goaltender
- Caught: Right
- Played for: Houston Aeros; Iowa Wild
- NHL draft: Undrafted
- Playing career: 2012–2016

Cody Reichard (born February 18, 1987) is an American professional ice hockey goaltender who is currently an unrestricted free agent who most recently played for the Evansville Icemen of the ECHL.

== Playing career ==
He played collegiate hockey with the Miami RedHawks in the Central Collegiate Hockey Association. During the 2012–13 season, Reichard appeared in 7 games for the Houston Aeros of the American Hockey League, on loan from the Stockton Thunder of the ECHL.

On August 21, 2013, Reichard's rights were traded by the Florida Everblades, to the Fort Wayne Komets.

On October 10, 2014, Reichard was traded from the Orlando Solar Bears to the Indy Fuel to begin the 2014–15 season.

On December 20, 2014, Reichard signed a professional try out with the Grand Rapids Griffins. Prior to signing a professional try out with the Griffins, Reichard appeared in 15 games with the Indy Fuel this season, compiling a 5–6–2 record, a 3.35 GAA and a 0.889 save percentage. On December 26, 2014, Reichard was returned to the Indy Fuel, following being loaned to the Griffins.

On January 6, 2015, Reichard along with Klarc Wilson was traded to the Stockton Thunder in exchange for goaltender Shane Owen.

== Career statistics ==
			Regular season									Playoffs
Season	Team	League	GP	W	L	T/OT	MIN	GA	SO	GAA	SV%	GP	W	L	MIN	GA	SO	GAA	SV%
2008–09	Miami RedHawks	CCHA	20	10	8	2	1,139	40	2	2.11	.914	—	—	—	—	—	—	—	—
2009–10	Miami RedHawks	CCHA	27	19	4	3	1,571	49	5	1.87	.921	—	—	—	—	—	—	—	—
2010–11	Miami RedHawks	CCHA	24	15	5	2	1,374	47	3	2.05	.912	—	—	—	—	—	—	—	—
2011–12	Miami RedHawks	CCHA	21	9	7	2	1,117	46	2	2.47	.900	—	—	—	—	—	—	—	—
2012–13	Stockton Thunder	ECHL	27	13	8	5	1,593	70	6	2.64	.911	—	—	—	—	—	—	—	—
2012–13	Houston Aeros	AHL	7	3	1	1	324	13	0	2.41	.910	—	—	—	—	—	—	—	—
2013–14	Fort Wayne Komets	ECHL	9	2	4	3	553	32	0	3.47	.898	—	—	—	—	—	—	—	—
2013–14	Iowa Wild	AHL	2	1	1	0	125	7	0	3.36	.913	—	—	—	—	—	—	—	—
2013–14	Utah Grizzlies	ECHL	2	0	0	2	129	6	0	2.79	.903	—	—	—	—	—	—	—	—
2013–14	Orlando Solar Bears	ECHL	20	13	4	1	1,077	57	0	3.18	.903	—	—	—	—	—	—	—	—
2014–15	Indy Fuel	ECHL	16	5	7	2	813	50	0	3.69	.878	—	—	—	—	—	—	—	—
2014–15	Stockton Thunder	ECHL	15	3	11	0	871	71	0	4.89	.867	—	—	—	—	—	—	—	—
2015–16	Evansville Icemen	ECHL	11	4	4	0	511	32	0	3.75	.896	—	—	—	—	—	—	—	—
AHL totals			9	4	2	1	449	20	0	2.885	.912	—	—	—	—	—	—	—	—

== Awards and achievements ==
Award	Year
All-CCHA First Team	2009–10
All-CCHA Player of the Year	2009–10
AHCA West Second-Team All-American	2009–10
CCHA All-Tournament Team	2011

Awards and achievements
Preceded by Chad Johnson	CCHA Best Goaltender; 2009–10	Succeeded by Shawn Hunwick
Preceded by Chad Johnson	CCHA Player of the Year; 2009–10	Succeeded by Andy Miele
Preceded by Trevor Nill	Ilitch Humanitarian Award; 2011–12	Succeeded by Brett Beebe / Kaare Odegard
