= Sheldon Dries =

American ice hockey player (born 1994)

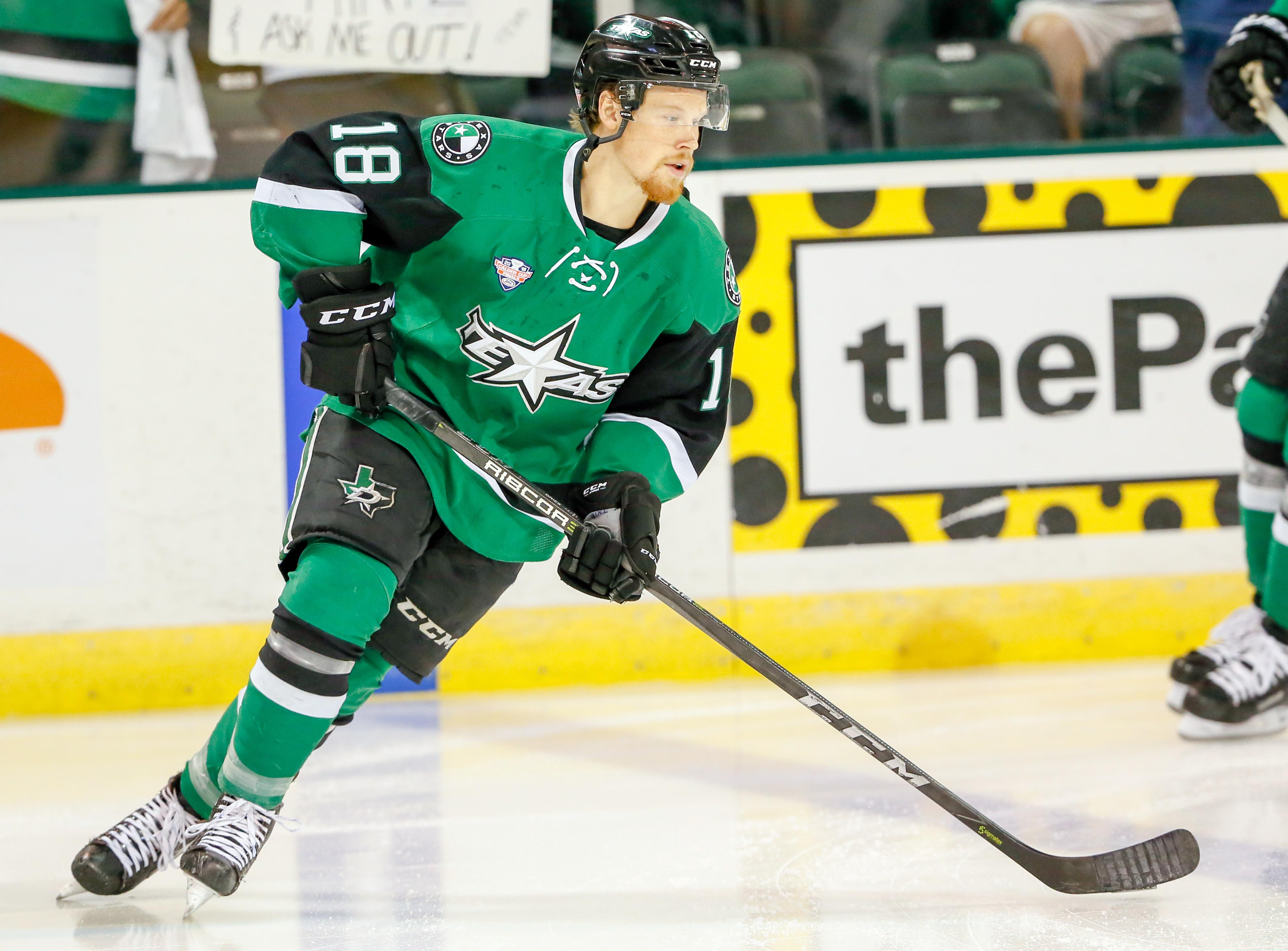
- Dries with the Texas Stars in 2018
- Born: April 23, 1994 (age 32) Macomb Township, Michigan, U.S.
- Height: 5 ft 9 in (175 cm)
- Weight: 185 lb (84 kg; 13 st 3 lb)
- Position: Center
- Shoots: Left
- NHL team Former teams: Detroit Red Wings; Colorado Avalanche; Vancouver Canucks
- NHL draft: Undrafted
- Playing career: 2017–present

Sheldon Stephen Dries (/draɪz/ DR-EYE-Z; born April 23, 1994) is an American professional ice hockey forward for the Detroit Red Wings of the National Hockey League (NHL).

== Early life ==
Dries was born on April 23, 1994, to parents Todd and Erika Dries. His father Todd and uncle played NCAA hockey for Western Michigan University. His cousin Danny Dries played for Ohio State and last played professional ice hockey for Ontario Reign in the ECHL in 2014.

== Playing career ==
=== Amateur ===
Dries began playing as a junior within the T1EHL, originally with the Detroit Honeybaked Bantom program. While with the HoneyBaked, Dries and teammate Nolan Gluchowski were selected for the ATOM AAA All-Star team.

During his under-16 year in 2010, his junior rights were selected in the United States Hockey League by the Green Bay Gamblers with the 22nd overall pick. He was also selected in the 2010 OHL Priority Selection by the Plymouth Whalers with the 275th overall selection. While playing with the T1EHL's Belle Tire in 2010–11, Dries verbally committed to play Division 1 hockey for Western Michigan University. Opting to continue his American junior career, Dries joined the Gamblers of the USHL at the end of his under-18 T1EHL season, appearing in 3 scoreless games. In his first full season with Green Bay, Dries contributed with 19 goals and 19 assists in helping the Gamblers claim the Clark Cup. He also graduated from Eisenhower High School in 2012.

Having committed to Western Michigan University of the National Collegiate Hockey Conference, Dries appeared in 116 USHL games for 87 points before joining the Broncos as a freshman in the 2013–14 season. In establishing a checking role amongst the Broncos forwards, Dries contributed with 3 goals and 7 points in 39 games. Approaching his sophomore season in 2014–15, despite his size, Dries's leadership qualities were noted as he was selected as the Broncos team Captain. He increased his points totals in finishing with 14 goals and 29 points in 37 games.

In his senior season with the Broncos in 2016–17, Dries as a three-year captain tallied a career-high 16 goals and 30 points in 36 games to help lead the Broncos to the NCAA Tournament. At the conclusion of the season he was selected to the NCHC Second All-Star Team. He was also named a finalist for the Defensive Forward of the Year.

=== Professional ===
As an undrafted free agent, Dries was signed to a one-year American Hockey League (AHL) contract with the Texas Stars on May 10, 2017. After attending the Dallas Stars 2017 NHL training camp, Dries began his rookie professional season with Texas in 2017–18. He made a quick transition to the AHL, showing a scoring touch along with a tenacity in traffic to score 19 goals and 30 points in 70 regular season games. Dries led all AHL rookies in the Calder Cup playoffs, scoring 10 goals in 22 post-season games as the Stars fell to the Toronto Marlies in the finals.

On July 2, 2018, Dries was signed to his first NHL contract in agreeing to a one-year, entry-level contract with the Colorado Avalanche. In the Avalanche's training camp and pre-season, Dries was a standout, taking his opportunity in surprisingly making the Avalanche's opening night roster for the 2018–19 season. He made his NHL debut on the Avalanche's fourth line, playing 6 minutes in a 4–1 home opening victory over the Minnesota Wild on October 4, 2018. He recorded his first career NHL goal on November 1 in a 6–5 loss to the Calgary Flames. Fellow rookie Vladislav Kamenev also scored his first NHL goal that game, making the pair the first Avalanche rookies to score their first NHL goals in the same game since January 27, 1995. Continuing to play in a fourth-line role, Dries made 40 appearances throughout the season with the Avalanche, posting 3 goals and 6 points. He split the year between the Avalanche and AHL affiliate, the Colorado Eagles, adding more offense with 11 points in 25 contests. Helping the Eagles reach the 2019 Calder Cup playoffs, he recorded one goal in four playoff games. On July 25, 2019, Dries signed a one-year, two-way contract extension with the Avalanche.

As a free agent from the Avalanche after three seasons within the organization, Dries was signed to a one-year, two-way contract with the Vancouver Canucks on July 28, 2021. During the 2023–24 season, Dries recorded 29 goals and 23 assists in 55 games for the Canucks' AHL affiliate, the Abbotsford Canucks.

On July 1, 2024, Dries signed a two-year, two-way contract with the Detroit Red Wings.

== Personal life ==
Dries proposed to his girlfriend Emilee in 2018.

== Career statistics ==
			Regular season					Playoffs
Season	Team	League	GP	G	A	Pts	PIM	GP	G	A	Pts	PIM
2010–11	Belle Tire	T1EHL	36	23	15	38	92	—	—	—	—	—
2010–11	Green Bay Gamblers	USHL	3	0	0	0	4	—	—	—	—	—
2011–12	Green Bay Gamblers	USHL	59	19	19	38	126	12	1	6	7	8
2012–13	Green Bay Gamblers	USHL	54	22	27	49	105	4	1	1	2	6
2013–14	Western Michigan University	NCHC	39	3	4	7	43	—	—	—	—	—
2014–15	Western Michigan University	NCHC	37	14	15	29	37	—	—	—	—	—
2015–16	Western Michigan University	NCHC	36	11	7	18	22	—	—	—	—	—
2016–17	Western Michigan University	NCHC	36	16	14	30	34	—	—	—	—	—
2017–18	Texas Stars	AHL	70	19	11	30	53	22	10	0	10	30
2018–19	Colorado Avalanche	NHL	40	3	3	6	26	—	—	—	—	—
2018–19	Colorado Eagles	AHL	25	3	8	11	19	4	1	0	1	0
2019–20	Colorado Eagles	AHL	50	21	14	35	69	—	—	—	—	—
2019–20	Colorado Avalanche	NHL	5	0	0	0	0	1	0	0	0	0
2020–21	Colorado Avalanche	NHL	3	0	0	0	4	—	—	—	—	—
2020–21	Colorado Eagles	AHL	18	5	5	10	14	—	—	—	—	—
2021–22	Abbotsford Canucks	AHL	54	35	27	62	20	2	1	0	1	0
2021–22	Vancouver Canucks	NHL	11	2	1	3	0	—	—	—	—	—
2022–23	Abbotsford Canucks	AHL	2	1	3	4	2	—	—	—	—	—
2022–23	Vancouver Canucks	NHL	63	11	6	17	29	—	—	—	—	—
2023–24	Abbotsford Canucks	AHL	55	29	23	52	45	6	1	2	3	4
2024–25	Grand Rapids Griffins	AHL	65	25	15	40	35	3	1	1	2	2
2025–26	Grand Rapids Griffins	AHL	57	23	22	45	13	8	2	5	7	4
2025–26	Detroit Red Wings	NHL	5	0	0	0	0	—	—	—	—	—
NHL totals			127	16	10	26	59	1	0	0	0	0

== Awards and honours ==
Award	Year
USHL
Clark Cup (Green Bay Gamblers)	2012
College
NCHC Second All-Star Team	2017
