= Andy Miele =

American ice hockey player (born 1988)

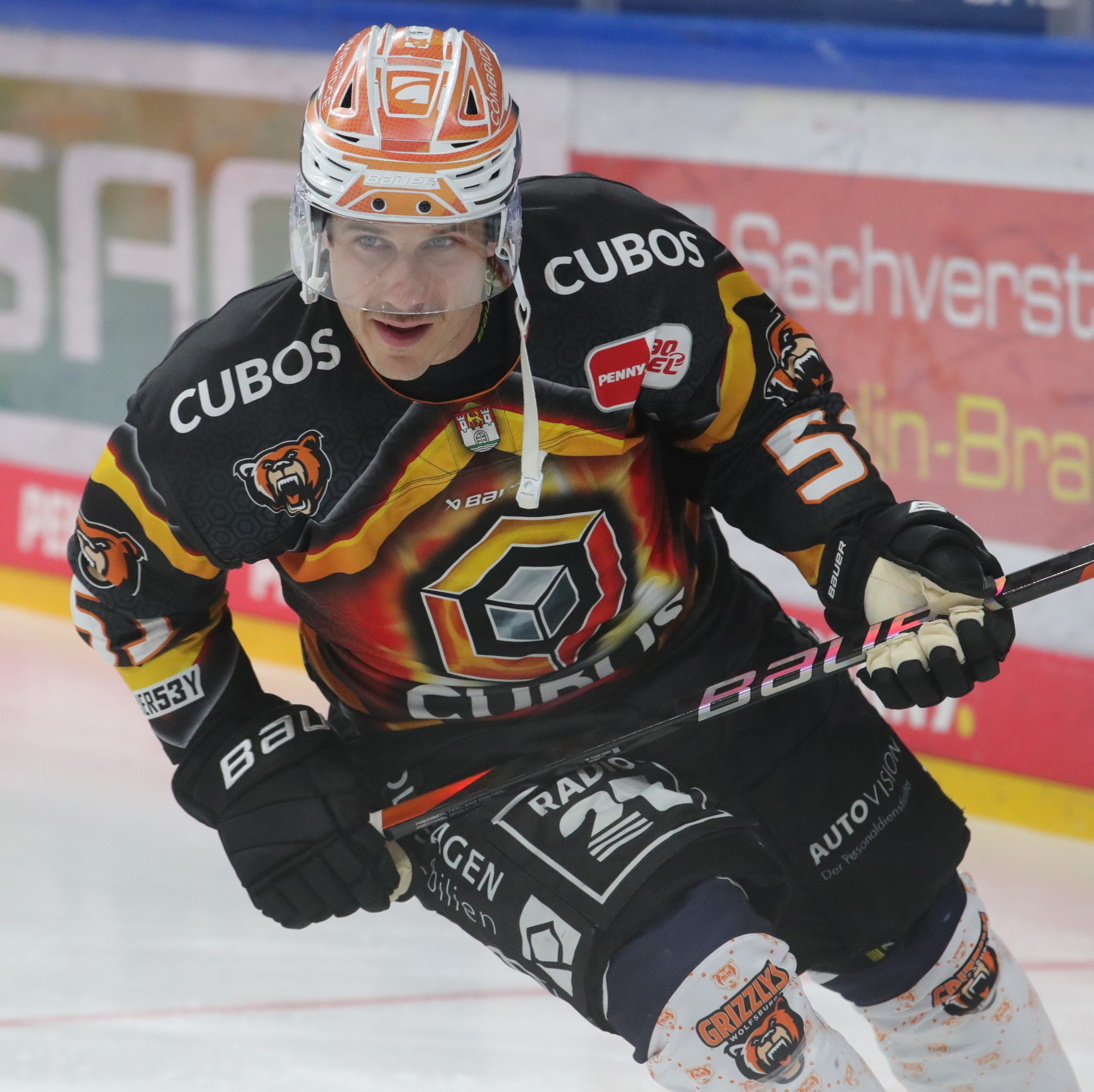
- Miele in 2023 with the Grizzlys Wolfsburg
- Born: April 15, 1988 (age 38) Grosse Pointe Woods, Michigan, U.S.
- Height: 5 ft 7 in (170 cm)
- Weight: 169 lb (77 kg; 12 st 1 lb)
- Position: Center
- Shoots: Left
- DEL team Former teams: Fischtown Pinguins; Phoenix Coyotes; Malmö Redhawks; Växjö Lakers; Torpedo Nizhny Novgorod; Lausanne HC; HV71; Grizzlys Wolfsburg
- National team: United States
- NHL draft: Undrafted
- Playing career: 2011–present

Andy Miele (born April 15, 1988) is an American professional ice hockey forward who is currently under contract with Fischtown Pinguins of the Deutsche Eishockey Liga (DEL). He won the Hobey Baker Award, US college hockey's highest honor playing for Miami University, played for the Phoenix Coyotes of the National Hockey League (NHL), and captained the 2022 United States men's national ice hockey team at the Beijing Winter Olympics.

== Playing career ==
=== Junior hockey ===
Miele played junior ice hockey in the Detroit area for the Little Caesars AAA U-18 in the Midwest Elite Hockey League before moving to the United States Hockey League with the Cedar Rapids RoughRiders for parts of two seasons (2005-2007) before moving to the Chicago Steel, and then finishing his junior career with 30 goals (41 points) in Chicago's 2007–08 season. He signed to play college hockey for Miami University.

=== Miami University ===
During the 2007–08 season, in his first season with Miami, Miele played in 18 games, where he registered six goals and eight assists. In the 2008–09 season, Miele was one of six players to play in 41 games while registering 15 goals and 16 assists, helping Miami advance to the Frozen Four.

In 2009–10, his junior year with Miami, Miele took his scoring to the next level, again helping the RedHawks advance to the Frozen Four. Appearing in 43 games, he was the second-leading scorer on the team, registering 15 goals and 29 assists, finishing above a point-per-game pace with 44 points.

As a senior at Miami, Miele was the team's leading scorer and led the nation in scoring with 24 goals and 47 assists in 39 games during the 2010–11 season. Miele went on a school-record-tying 17-game point streak from January 8 to March 19, during which he posted a total of 38 points. Miele was named the CCHA Player of the Month in January and February and the National Player of the Month in February. Miami finished third in the CCHA, and Miele helped lead Miami to win its first-ever CCHA Championship, the Mason Cup. During the 2011 CCHA Tournament, Miele registered six points, including four points in Miami's semifinal victory over Notre Dame. Miele was named to the CCHA All-Tournament Team and was named the tournament's Most Valuable Player. Miele won the Hobey Baker Award in 2011 as the top NCAA men's ice hockey player, and was also named the USCHO Player of the Year, CCHA Player of the Year, and USA Hockey's College Player of the Year.

=== Professional ===
On April 2, 2011, the Phoenix Coyotes signed Miele to a two-year, entry-level contract. Assigned to the minors for most of the 2011–12 season, Miele recorded his first professional goal and assist in his professional debut at Bridgeport on October 8. He was the leading scorer for the Portland Pirates, recording 13 goals and a team-high 38 assists in 69 games. Miele made his NHL debut for the Coyotes on October 23, 2011, in a game against the Anaheim Ducks. On June 29, 2012, the Phoenix Coyotes re-signed Miele to a one-year, two-way contract. During the 2012–13 season, Miele recorded 19 goals and 34 assists in 70 games. The Pirates finished second in the Atlantic Division and were swept by Eastern Conference champion Syracuse Crunch in the first round with two of the three losses in overtime. Miele scored one goal and two assists in three playoff games.

In the 2014 off-season, the Detroit Red Wings signed Miele to a one-year, two-way contract. Miele spent most of his pro career with the Coyotes' AHL affiliate, the Portland Pirates, where he recorded 35 goals and 107 points in 139 AHL games. In the 2014–15 season, Miele led the Griffins in scoring, recording 26 goals and 44 assists in 71 games, finishing second overall in league scoring. During the 2015 Calder Cup playoffs, Miele was the second-leading scorer for the Griffins, recording three goals and 11 assists in 16 games. Following an outstanding season with the Griffins, Miele was named to the AHL First All-Star Team. On July 1, 2015, the Red Wings signed Miele to a one-year contract extension.

After his stint with Grand Rapids, on July 1, 2016, the Philadelphia Flyers signed Miele to a one-year contract. In the 2016–17 season, Miele was assigned to the Flyers AHL affiliate, the Lehigh Valley Phantoms, out of training camp. Playing as a top-line forward, Miele continued in his offensive role, leading the club with 44 assists in 65 games.

As an impending free agent following a first-round exit in the post-season with the Phantoms, Miele opted to pursue a European career. He agreed to a two-year optional contract in Sweden with the Malmö Redhawks of the Swedish Hockey League (SHL) on May 3, 2017. During the 2017–18 season, after producing offensively for the Redhawks with 27 points in 39 games, Miele would transfer to another SHL team, the Växjö Lakers in time for the post-season run. He contributed 9 points in 13 playoff games to help Växjö capture the Le Mat Trophy.

Miele left Sweden after one season as a free agent to sign a one-year contract with Russian club, Torpedo Nizhny Novgorod of the Kontinental Hockey League (KHL), on May 21, 2018. In the 2018–19 season, Miele was used in top-line role, placing third on the team with 16 goals and 32 points in 61 games.

After two seasons abroad, Miele returned to North America as a free agent and signed for a second tenure within the Arizona Coyotes organization, agreeing to a two-year, two-way contract on July 1, 2019. In the 2019–20 season, Miele was assigned to AHL affiliate the Tucson Roadrunners. He made 58 appearances as an alternate captain with the Roadrunner, placing third in scoring with 15 goals and 48 points before the season was canceled due to the COVID-19 pandemic.

Unable to add to his NHL experience with the Coyotes, Miele was placed on unconditional waivers in order for a mutual termination from the final year of his contract on July 11, 2020. As a free agent, Miele immediately agreed to return to former KHL club, Torpedo Nizhny Novgorod of the KHL, signing a one-year deal on July 13, 2020. Miele collected 36 points through 47 games before leaving the club due to the Russian invasion of Ukraine. He finished out the season with Lausanne HC in the National League, registering 4 assists through 7 post-season games.

On 13 May 2022, Miele returned to the SHL in agreeing to a one-year deal with newly promoted club, HV71.

== International play ==
Miele made his international debut for the United States at the 2011 IIHF World Championship. He was one of three college players to represent the USA. Miele skated in two of USA's seven games in Slovakia, where he recorded two assists. Miele represented the United States at the 2014 IIHF World Championship, where he skated in four games and recorded zero goals or assists.

He was named as team captain for the 2022 US Olympic Team, the first Michigan native to be so honored.

== Personal ==
Miele is a member of the advisory board for You Can Play, a campaign dedicated to fighting homophobia in sports. Miele was married in the Summer of 2016 to his wife, Hilary and the two had their first child, Bonnie, on November 7, 2019.

== Career statistics ==
=== Regular season and playoffs ===
			Regular season					Playoffs
Season	Team	League	GP	G	A	Pts	PIM	GP	G	A	Pts	PIM
2004–05	Little Caesars 18U AAA	MWEHL	19	15	13	28	48	—	—	—	—	—
2005–06	Cedar Rapids RoughRiders	USHL	52	10	17	27	41	8	0	4	4	4
2006–07	Cedar Rapids RoughRiders	USHL	13	7	8	15	15	—	—	—	—	—
2006–07	Chicago Steel	USHL	45	13	29	42	70	4	2	4	6	14
2007–08	Chicago Steel	USHL	29	30	11	41	78	—	—	—	—	—
2007–08	Miami RedHawks	CCHA	18	6	8	14	4	—	—	—	—	—
2008–09	Miami RedHawks	CCHA	41	15	16	31	34	—	—	—	—	—
2009–10	Miami RedHawks	CCHA	43	15	29	44	61	—	—	—	—	—
2010–11	Miami RedHawks	CCHA	39	24	47	71	35	—	—	—	—	—
2011–12	Portland Pirates	AHL	69	16	38	54	43	—	—	—	—	—
2011–12	Phoenix Coyotes	NHL	7	0	0	0	6	—	—	—	—	—
2012–13	Portland Pirates	AHL	70	19	34	53	72	3	1	2	3	15
2012–13	Phoenix Coyotes	NHL	1	0	0	0	0	—	—	—	—	—
2013–14	Portland Pirates	AHL	70	27	45	72	66	—	—	—	—	—
2013–14	Phoenix Coyotes	NHL	7	0	2	2	5	—	—	—	—	—
2014–15	Grand Rapids Griffins	AHL	71	26	44	70	42	16	3	11	14	20
2015–16	Grand Rapids Griffins	AHL	75	18	44	62	77	9	2	5	7	12
2016–17	Lehigh Valley Phantoms	AHL	65	13	44	57	54	5	1	2	3	4
2017–18	Malmö Redhawks	SHL	39	10	17	27	39	—	—	—	—	—
2017–18	Växjö Lakers	SHL	7	0	5	5	0	13	1	8	9	24
2018–19	Torpedo Nizhny Novgorod	KHL	61	16	16	32	57	7	0	2	2	6
2019–20	Tucson Roadrunners	AHL	58	15	33	48	46	—	—	—	—	—
2020–21	Torpedo Nizhny Novgorod	KHL	55	19	25	44	35	4	0	1	1	4
2021–22	Torpedo Nizhny Novgorod	KHL	47	13	23	36	33	—	—	—	—	—
2021–22	Lausanne HC	NL	7	2	7	9	2	7	0	4	4	8
2022–23	HV71	SHL	51	12	24	36	36	—	—	—	—	—
2023–24	Grizzlys Wolfsburg	DEL	52	14	32	46	47	4	0	3	3	14
2024–25	Grizzlys Wolfsburg	DEL	52	16	16	32	44	—	—	—	—	—
2025–26	Fischtown Pinguins	DEL	51	7	22	29	53	7	2	7	9	17
AHL totals			478	134	282	416	400	33	7	20	27	51
NHL totals			15	0	2	2	11	—	—	—	—	—

=== International ===
Year	Team	Event	Result	GP	G	A	Pts	PIM
2011	United States	WC	8th	2	0	2	2	2
2014	United States	WC	6th	4	0	0	0	4
2022	United States	OG	5th	4	1	3	4	0
Senior totals				10	1	5	6	6

== Awards and honors ==
Award	Year
College
All-CCHA Second Team	2009–10
All-CCHA First Team	2010–11
CCHA Player of the Year	2010–11
USA Hockey College Player of the Year	2010–11
Hobey Baker Memorial Award	2010–11
AHCA West First-Team All-American	2010–11
CCHA All-Tournament Team	2011
CCHA Tournament MVP	2011
AHL
Second All-Star Team	2013–14
First All-Star Team	2014–15
SHL
Le Mat Trophy (Växjö Lakers)	2018

Awards and achievements
Preceded by Blake Geoffrion	Winner of the Hobey Baker Award; 2010–11	Succeeded by Jack Connolly
Preceded by Gustav Nyquist	NCAA Ice Hockey Scoring Champion; 2010–11	Succeeded by Spencer Abbott
Preceded by Cody Reichard	CCHA Player of the Year; 2010–11	Succeeded by Torey Krug
Preceded by Drew Palmisano	Perani Cup Champion; 2010–11	Succeeded by Reilly Smith
Preceded by Shawn Hunwick	CCHA Most Valuable Player in Tournament; 2011	Succeeded by Frank Slubowski
