= Miami RedHawks men's ice hockey =

Men's ice hockey team for Miami University

- Current season
- University: Miami University
- Conference: NCHC
- Head coach: Anthony Noreen; 3rd season, 21–42–5 (.346)
- Assistant coaches: Troy Thibodeau; Zack Cisek; David Nies
- Arena: Steve Cady Arena at the Goggin Ice Center; Oxford, Ohio
- Colors: Red and white

NCAA tournament runner-up
- 2009

NCAA tournament Frozen Four
- 2009, 2010

NCAA tournament appearances
- 1993, 1997, 2004, 2006, 2007, 2008, 2009, 2010, 2011, 2012, 2013, 2015

Conference tournament champions
- CCHA: 2011; NCHC: 2015

Conference regular season champions
- CCHA: 1993, 2006, 2010, 2013

Current uniform

The Miami RedHawks men's ice hockey team is a National Collegiate Athletic Association (NCAA) Division I college ice hockey program that represents Miami University, in Oxford, Ohio. The RedHawks are a member of the National Collegiate Hockey Conference (NCHC), starting play in the conference's 2013–14 inaugural season. Prior to the NCHC, from 1980 to 2013, the RedHawks were a member of the Central Collegiate Hockey Association (CCHA) until the original CCHA disbanded in 2013. They play in Steve "Coach" Cady Arena at the Goggin Ice Center.

== History ==
=== Early seasons (1978–1999) ===
Miami University added hockey to the roster of varsity sports in 1978, with the leadership of the program's first coach, Steve Cady, playing at the Goggin Ice Arena. Miami played as an independent Division I team for the first two seasons, collecting an overall record of 45–27–3. The team joined the CCHA for the 1980–81 season. The first Miamian to play in the National Hockey League was goaltender Alain Chevrier, who played for Miami from 1980 to 1984, making his NHL debut with the New Jersey Devils in 1985, and left-wing Craig Fisher coming next in 1990 with the Philadelphia Flyers, having turned pro after two seasons in Oxford. Fisher was the first Miamian to be honored as first-team All-CCHA for his 1989-90 campaign.

Success was fleeting until the 1992–93 season with a stellar 22-3-5 (.750) record and CCHA regular season title. Miami then capped a historic year for the program when, led by the third head coach in program history, George Gwozdecky, the team received its first bid to the NCAA Men's Ice Hockey Tournament. Miami was led by Chris Bergeron (61 points), Brian Savage (2nd-Team All-American, 37 goals), defenseman Bobby Marshall (2nd-Team All American, 45 points) and goalie Richard Shulmistra (2.71 GAA). The team lost in the first round to Wisconsin 3–1 at the Joe Louis Arena in Detroit, Michigan.

Miami hockey reached another milestone in the 1994-95 season when goaltender Chuck Thuss became the first first-team All American. Thuss took an unusual path to the honor having been a back-up goaltender for 3 seasons, not playing a single minute for the Red and White until his outstanding senior season in which he posted 16 wins and a 2.87 GAA in 1983 minutes. Thuss was also honored by the CCHA in 1995 with the Terry Flanagan Memorial Award for demonstrating "perseverance, dedication and courage while overcoming severe adversity".

Gwozdecky had left Miami to coach the Denver Pioneers after the 1993-94 season, but successor Mark Mazzoleni took the 1996-97 team to the 1997 NCAA Division I Men's Ice Hockey Tournament with a 27-11-3 record, led by defenseman Dan Boyle (first-team All-American, 54 points) and center Randy Robitaille (first-team All-American, 61 points). Miami lost to Cornell 4-2 in the regional quarterfinals played at Van Andel Arena in Grand Rapids, Michigan.

=== The Brotherhood (1999–2008) ===
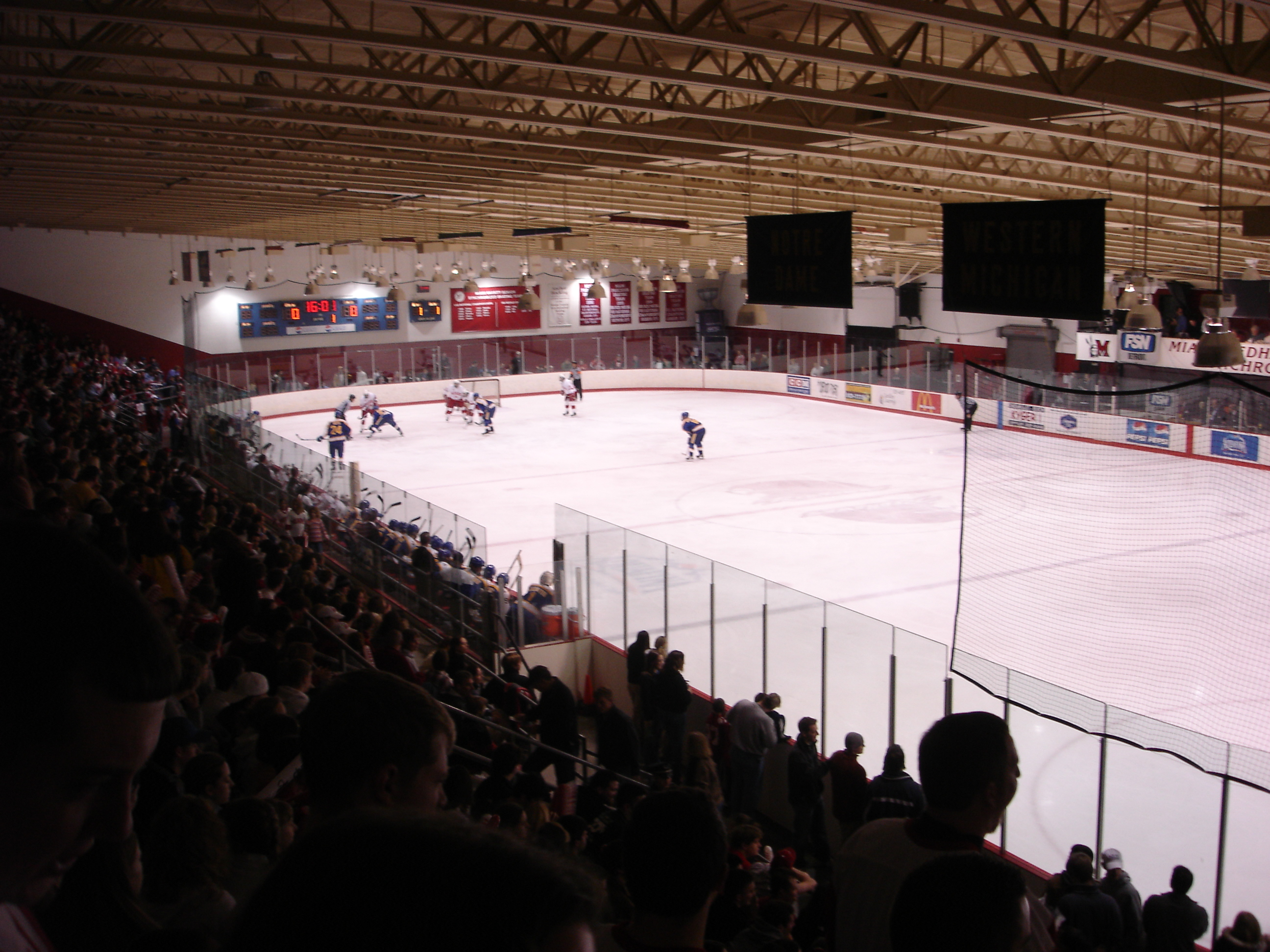
The former Goggin Ice Arena in 2005

Mark Mazzoleni left Miami to coach Harvard after the 1998-99 season. The RedHawks turned to former Miami player Enrico Blasi, who was working as an assistant coach at Denver under former Miami coach George Gwozdecky. Blasi, at the time, became the youngest head coach in Division I college hockey at 27 years old.

Blasi established his program, calling it the Brotherhood, and brought the 23-14-4 (.610) 2003-04 RedHawks team to the 2004 NCAA Division I Men's Ice Hockey Tournament, losing 3–2 in the regional semi-final to eventual national champions Denver at the World Arena in Colorado Springs. The team was led by Derek Edwardson (2nd-Team All-American, 48 points) and Greg Hogeboom (42 points).

Miami began a streak of 8-straight NCAA tournament appearances when the 2005-06 team finished 26-9-4 (.718) behind first-team All-American Andy Greene and the stellar goaltending duo of Jeff Zatkoff (2.02 GAA) and Charlie Effinger (1.83 GAA). Miami lost to Boston College 5-0 in front of a partisan crowd in the regional semi-finals at the DCU Center in Worcester, Massachusetts, in the 2006 NCAA Tournament.

The RedHawks reached another level in 2006-07 with a 24-14-4 (.619) record, playing in the new Goggin Ice Center, advancing again to the 2007 NCAA Tournament, and winning their first NCAA tournament game, 2–1 over the top-seeded New Hampshire in the Verizon Wireless Arena in Manchester, New Hampshire. Miami then lost to Boston College 4-0 in the regional final. The 2006-07 team was led by 2nd-Team All-American Nathan Davis (21 goals, 50 points).

Miami followed up with a stellar campaign in 2007-08, 33-8-1 (.798), advancing to the 2008 NCAA Division I Men's Ice Hockey Tournament, defeating Air Force, 3–2 in overtime, but then losing to eventual champions Boston College for the third year straight, 4–3 in overtime in the regional final. The team was paced by first-team All American Ryan Jones (31 goals, 49 points) and defenseman Alec Martinez (2nd-Team All-American).

=== Frozen Four appearances (2009–2013) ===
In 2009, the Red and White made their first appearance in the Frozen Four. The team finished the regular season with a 23-13-5 (.622) record, entering the post-season as a 4-seed in the 4-team regional in Minneapolis. Miami beat top-seed Denver 4-2 in the opening round and then Minnesota-Duluth 2-1 to advance to the Frozen Four at the Verizon Center in Washington, D.C. The RedHawks beat Bemidji State 4-1 in the national semifinal game, advancing to the championship game against Boston University. Trailing 3-1 with just 3:23 to go in the third period, Boston University pulled their goaltender and forced overtime with a goal by Terrier Zach Cohen with just 17 seconds remaining. BU then scored 11:47 into overtime with a goal by Colby Cohen to secure the national title. The 2009 team was led by 2nd-Team All-American Carter Camper (42 points) and the goaltending of Connor Knapp (2.09 GAA) and Cody Reichard (2.11 ERA).

Tragedy struck the program and school on Friday February 5, 2010, when Miami student hockey manager, Brendan Burke, the son of Toronto Maple Leafs GM Brian Burke, and a friend/passenger died in a traffic accident on icy winter roads in South-Central Indiana. Burke had become an advocate for LGBT awareness with the support of Coach Blasi and the Miami team. The Burke family formed the You Can Play campaign, dedicated to the eradication of homophobia, in sports, to carry on the work of Brendan. The team remained strong in the wake of the accident, using the tragedy as inspiration on the ice. The team scored 10 goals the following night against Lake Superior State University. And on February 12, 2010, after a victory over Bowling Green State University, the RedHawks claimed their third CCHA regular-season title in program history.

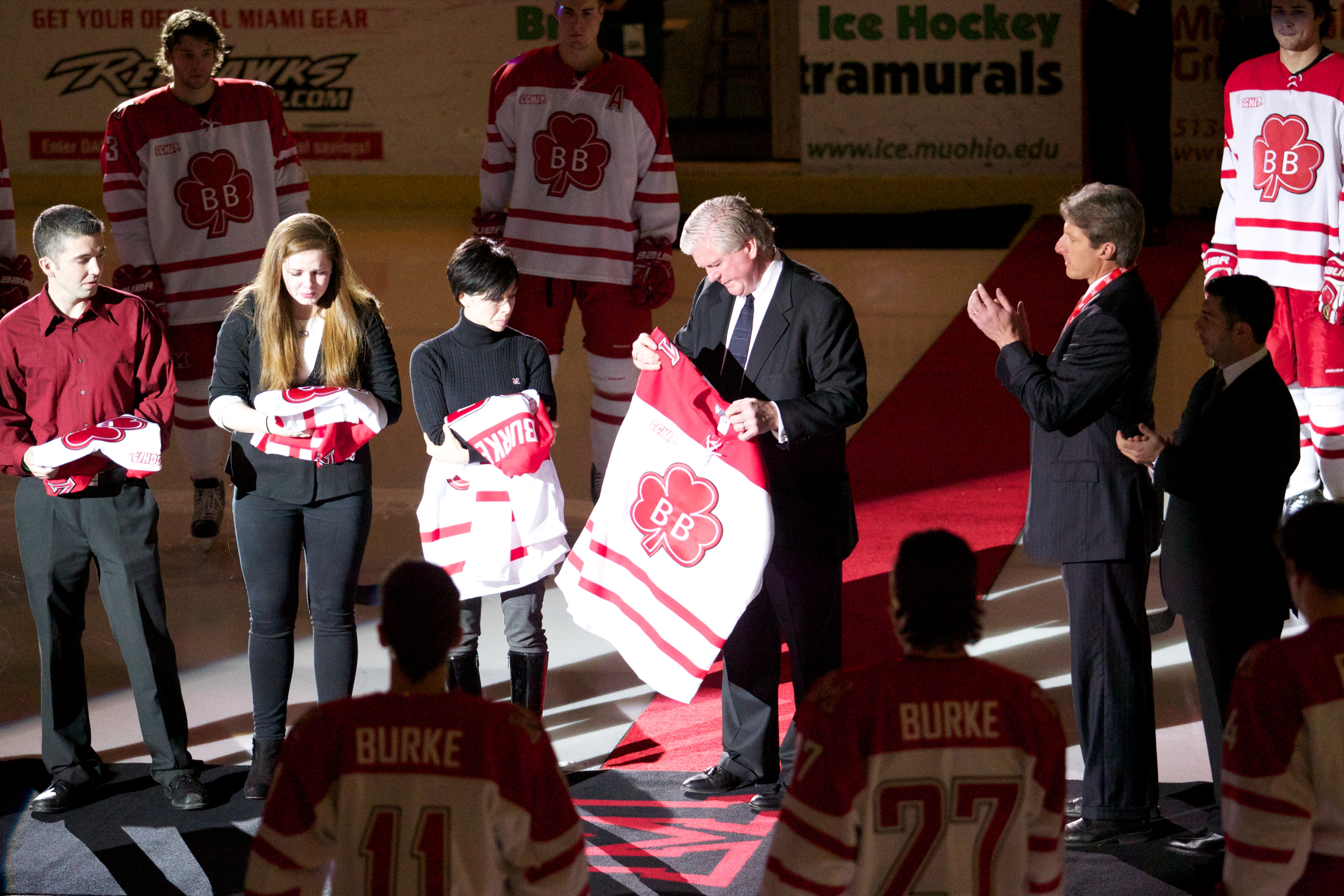
On February 5, 2011, the one-year anniversary of Burke's death, Brian Burke and his family are presented with special hockey sweaters in commemoration of Brendan Burke, which the RedHawks wore during their game that evening.

The 2009-10 Miami squad would again advance to the Frozen Four, defeating Alabama-Huntsville 2-1 in the opening round of the Midwest Regional at the Allen County War Memorial Coliseum in Ft. Wayne, Indiana, and then beating Michigan 3–2 in double-overtime, when Alden Hirschfeld scored 1:54 into the second extra period. Miami then lost to post-season nemesis Boston College 7-1 in the Frozen Four semi-finals at Ford Field in Detroit, Michigan. The team was led by goaltender Cody Reichard (2nd-Team All-American (1.87 GAA), right-wing Jarod Palmer (45 points), and center Tommy Wingels (42 points).

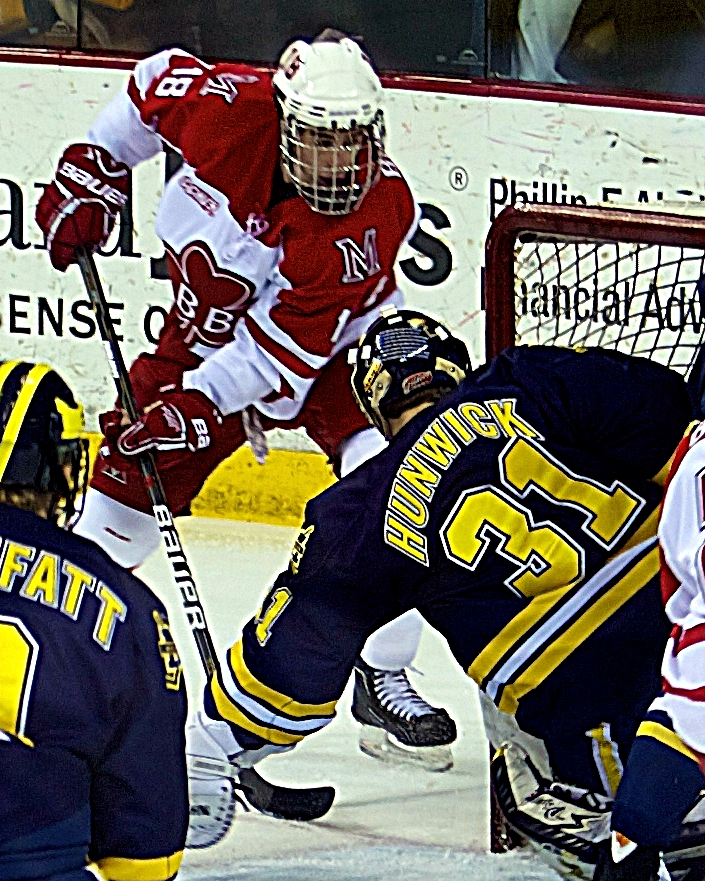
Reilly Smith, RedHawks, 2011

The RedHawks finished the 2010–11 regular season ranked third in the CCHA, 23-10-6 (.667), giving the team a first round bye in the 2011 CCHA Tournament. The RedHawks faced Alaska in the second round and swept Alaska by a combined score of 8–2. The RedHawks then beat Notre Dame 6–2 in semifinal round and dismantled the Western Michigan Broncos 5-2 in the championship to give the university its first Mason Cup. After the strong finish in the regular season the team was ranked as a #1 seed in the 2011 NCAA Tournament. The RedHawks were placed into the Northeast Regional at the Verizon Wireless Arena in Manchester, New Hampshire. In the opening round of the tournament the team faced the 4th-seeded New Hampshire Wildcats and lost 3–1 in front of a pro-New Hampshire crowd.

Miami senior forward Andy Miele (first-team All-American) was named as the 2011 Hobey Baker Award winner, becoming the university's first Hobey Baker winner. Miele lead the nation in scoring with 71 points (24 goals and 47 assists). It was the most in Division I since the 2002–03 season and 11 more than the second highest scorer in the 2010–11 season. In addition, he had at least one point in 33 games and multiple points in 22 and tied a school record with a 17-game points streak from January 8, 2011, to March 19, 2011.

In July 2011, following the announcement in June 2011 that the Big Ten Conference will begin sponsoring men's ice hockey, the athletic directors of Miami and five other schools, Colorado College, the University of Denver, the University of Minnesota Duluth, the University of Nebraska Omaha, and the University of North Dakota, announced the formation of the National Collegiate Hockey Conference. Miami would remain in the CCHA until the NCHC began play in the 2013–14 season.

The 2011–12 season marked another return to the CCHA Semifinals at Joe Louis Arena and seventh straight appearance in the NCAA Tournament. The RedHawks finished the season with a record of 24–15–2 (.610). Despite a slow start to the season that included a five-game winless streak through October, they finished the regular season with a six-game win streak and, despite a loss in the CCHA semifinals, the RedHawks received an at-large bid to the 2012 NCAA Tournament, seeded second in the East Regional at the Webster Bank Arena in Bridgeport, Connecticut. Miami played the third-seeded UMass Lowell in the opening round in the tournament. The RedHawks rallied in the third period to overcome a three-goal deficit and tie the game to force overtime. The RedHawks season was ended just over two minutes into overtime when UMass Lowell forward Riley Wetmore capitalized on a rebound to give UMass Lowell a 4–3 win. Miami was led on the season by Reilly Smith (first-team All-American, 30 goals, 48 points).

Miami would play one last season in the old CCHA in 2012-13, 25-12-5 (.655), winning the regular season title and advancing yet again to the NCAA Tournament, placed in the Midwest Regional at the Huntington Center in Toledo, Ohio. Miami dominated Minnesota State 4-0 in the first round, but lost the regional final to St. Cloud State 4-1. Austin Czarnik (14 goals), Blake Coleman (19 points) and the goaltending duo of Ryan McKay and Jay Williams led a balanced RedHawks squad.

=== Move to the NCHC (2013–present) ===
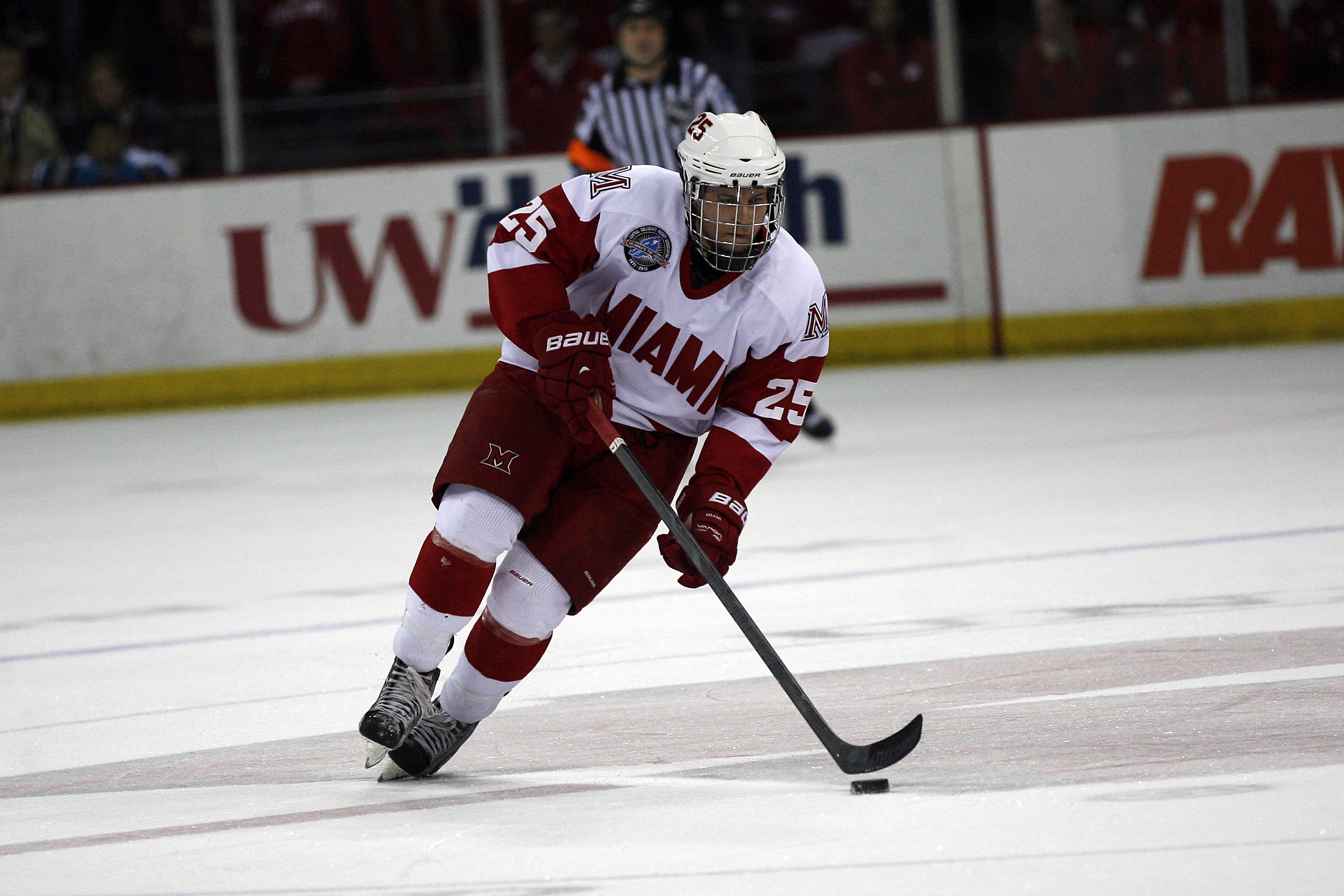
Blake Coleman, 2013

Miami moved to the newly formed NCHC in 2013 and returned to their winning ways in the second NCHC season, finishing the season 25–14–1 (.638) and taking the NCHC post-season tournament title. The Red and White entered the 2015 NCAA Division I Men's Ice Hockey Tournament as a top-seed but drew the unfavorable position of playing a host team, Providence, on their home ice at the Dunkin' Donuts Center in Providence, Rhode Island, dropping the opener 7–5 to the Friars, who would make an improbable run to the national title. Miami pulled their goalie for much of the third period after trailing 6–2, but a furious third period rally came up short. Austin Czarnik (2nd-Team All-American, 36 assists, 45 points), Riley Barber (20 goals, 40 points), and Blake Coleman (37 points) led the Red and White.

The Brotherhood began to fracture in the depth of the new conference, and Enrico Blasi was dismissed by his alma mater at the conclusion of the 2018–19 season, their 4th losing season in a row. Miami then tapped former RedHawk Chris Bergeron, who played with Blasi and then served as his assistant coach before becoming the head coach at Bowling Green in 2010. Bergeron helped to restore that program, which was on the verge of being shut down, taking the Falcons to the 2019 NCAA Division I Men's Ice Hockey Tournament in his final season at BG. Bergeron has had a rough go of it at Miami with a 28-90-13 record and a 17-71-9 conference record. Blasi was hired in 2021 as the coach of the St. Thomas Tommies, their first NCAA Division I coach as they move up from Division III. St. Thomas plays in a newly re-formed CCHA conference.

On March 19, 2024, reports came out that head coach Chris Bergeron would be relieved of his duties. The RedHawks failed to win more than eight games in any of the five seasons while he was at the helm, and they ended the 2023-2024 campaign on a 16-game winless streak, their second-longest drought in team history. His .257 winning percentage (35-116-16) is the worst among any Miami hockey coach, and his teams were 0-7 in the NCHC Tournament.

== Season-by-season results ==
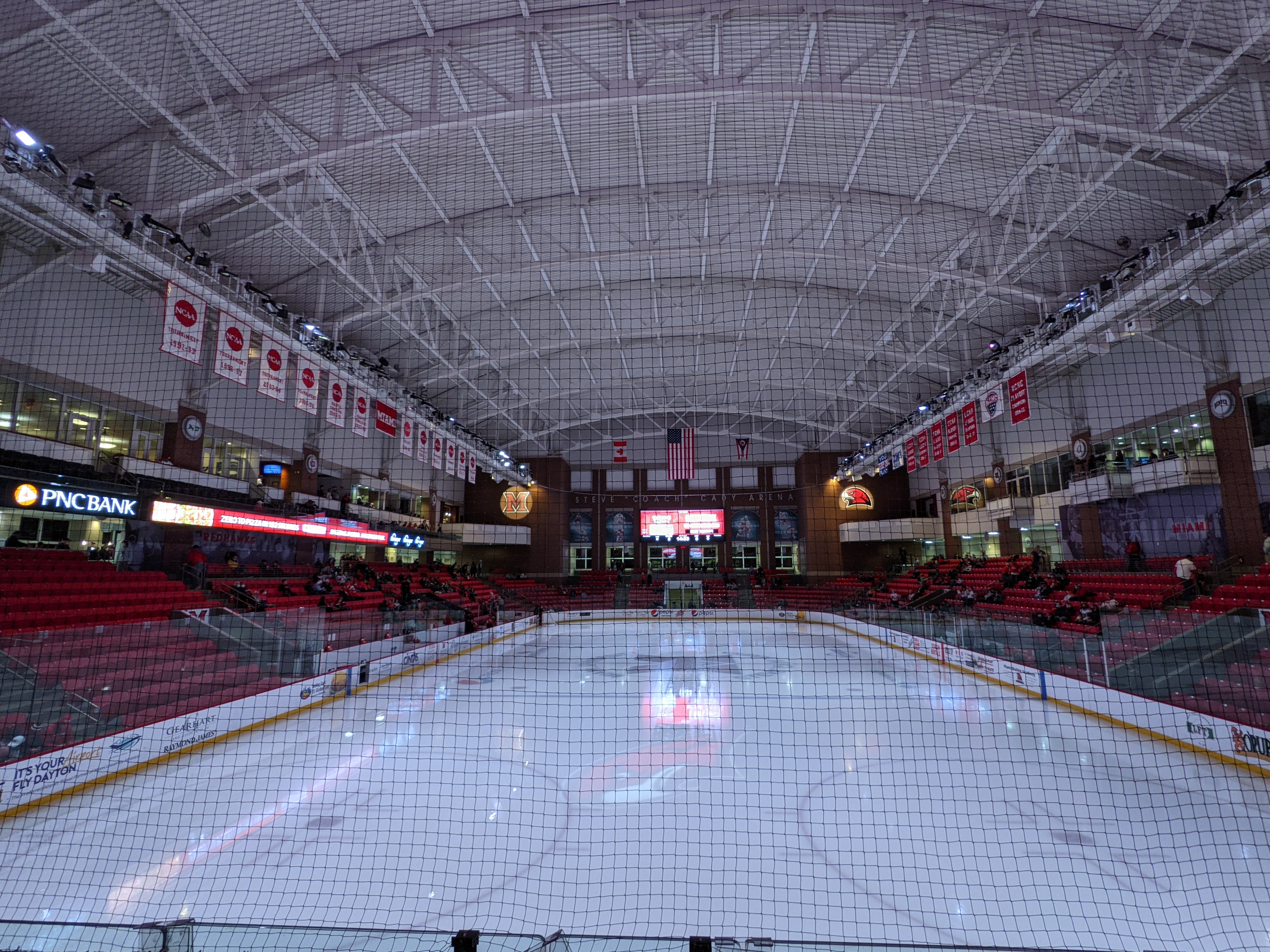
Goggin Ice Center in 2021

=== All-time coaching records ===
As of the completion of 2025-26 season

| Tenure | Coach | Years | Record | Pct. |
|---|---|---|---|---|
| 1978–1985 | Steve Cady | 7 | 121–126–12 | .490 |
| 1985–1989 | Bill Davidge | 4 | 39–111–3 | .265 |
| 1989–1994 | George Gwozdecky | 5 | 83–94–19 | .472 |
| 1994–1999 | Mark Mazzoleni | 5 | 85–83–20 | .505 |
| 1999–2019 | Enrico Blasi | 20 | 398–311–76 | .555 |
| 2019–2024 | Chris Bergeron | 5 | 35–116–16 | .257 |
| 2024–present | Anthony Noreen | 2 | 21–44–5 | .336 |
| Totals | 7 coaches | 47 seasons | 782–885–154 | .472 |

== Statistical leaders ==
=== Career points leaders ===
| Player | Years | GP | G | A | Pts | PIM |
|---|---|---|---|---|---|---|
| Steve Morris | 1979–1983 | 145 | 64 | 138 | 202 | |
| Carter Camper | 2007–2011 | 156 | 69 | 114 | 183 | |
| Rick Kuraly | 1979–1983 | 145 | 101 | 78 | 179 | |
| Kevyn Adams | 1992–1996 | 151 | 69 | 103 | 172 | |
| Bill Bok | 1978–1982 | 136 | 72 | 97 | 169 | |
| Austin Czarnik | 2011–2015 | 159 | 46 | 123 | 169 | |
| Andy Miele | 2007–2011 | 141 | 60 | 99 | 159 | |
| Vern Sketchley | 1978–1982 | 131 | 80 | 78 | 158 | |
| Todd Channell | 1982–1986 | 146 | 64 | 91 | 155 | |
| Kevin Beaton | 1979–1983 | 142 | 47 | 103 | 150 | |

=== Career goaltending leaders ===
GP = Games played; Min = Minutes played; W = Wins; L = Losses; T = Ties; GA = Goals against; SO = Shutouts; SV% = Save percentage; GAA = Goals against average

Minimum 1,500 minutes

| Player | Years | GP | Min | W | L | T | GA | SO | SV% | GAA |
|---|---|---|---|---|---|---|---|---|---|---|
| Connor Knapp | 2008–2012 | 84 | 4800 | 46 | 22 | 11 | 155 | 13 | .918 | 1.94 |
| Jeff Zatkoff | 2005–2008 | 81 | 4920 | 55 | 21 | 5 | 161 | 7 | .927 | 1.96 |
| Cody Reichard | 2008–2012 | 92 | 5201 | 53 | 24 | 9 | 182 | 12 | .912 | 2.10 |
| Charlie Effinger | 2004–2008 | 53 | 2907 | 32 | 12 | 4 | 114 | 2 | .912 | 2.35 |
| Jay Williams | 2012–2016 | 87 | 4845 | 46 | 29 | 4 | 191 | 4 | .909 | 2.37 |

Statistics current through the end of the 2023–24 season.

== Players ==
=== Current roster ===
As of September 17, 2025.

| No. | Nat. | Player | Class | Pos | Height | Weight | DoB | Hometown | Previous team | NHL rights |
|---|---|---|---|---|---|---|---|---|---|---|
| 2 | (United States) | Shaun McEwen | Freshman | D | 6' 0" (1.83 m) | 192 lb (87 kg) | 2004-01-21 | Hadley, Massachusetts | Tri-City Storm (USHL) | — |
| 3 | (United States) | Nick Donato | Graduate | D | 6' 0" (1.83 m) | 190 lb (86 kg) | 2002-07-27 | Lake Forest, Illinois | Tri-City Storm (USHL) | — |
| 6 | (United States) | Michael Quinn | Sophomore | D | 5' 11" (1.8 m) | 172 lb (78 kg) | 2003-03-25 | St. Louis, Missouri | Fargo Force (USHL) | — |
| 7 | (United States) | Charlie Michaud | Freshman | D | 6' 0" (1.83 m) | 196 lb (89 kg) | 2006-08-12 | Denver, Colorado | Madison Capitols (USHL) | — |
| 8 | (United States) | John Emmons | Sophomore | F | 5' 11" (1.8 m) | 170 lb (77 kg) | 2004-01-05 | Washington, Michigan | Minot Minotauros (NAHL) | — |
| 9 | (Canada) | Kyle Aucoin | Graduate | D | 6' 0" (1.83 m) | 175 lb (79 kg) | 2002-07-02 | Ottawa, Ontario | Harvard (ECAC) | DET, 156th overall 2020 |
| 10 | (United States) | Nicholas Mikan | Sophomore | F | 6' 4" (1.93 m) | 229 lb (104 kg) | 2004-03-31 | Edina, Minnesota | St. Thomas (CCHA) | — |
| 11 | (United States) | Justin Stupka | Freshman | F | 6' 2" (1.88 m) | 214 lb (97 kg) | 2005-03-15 | Pittsburgh, Pennsylvania | Sioux City Musketeers (USHL) | — |
| 12 | (Canada) | Owen Lalonde | Graduate | D | 6' 1" (1.85 m) | 187 lb (85 kg) | 2000-02-01 | Windsor, Ontario | Queen's (OUA) | — |
| 13 | (Canada) | Kocha Delic | Freshman | F | 5' 11" (1.8 m) | 198 lb (90 kg) | 2004-03-11 | Ottawa, Ontario | Sudbury Wolves (OHL) | — |
| 14 | (United States) | Ryan Smith | Sophomore | F | 5' 9" (1.75 m) | 179 lb (81 kg) | 2005-10-03 | Pendleton, New York | Quinnipiac (ECAC) | — |
| 17 | (United States) | Maximilion Helgeson | Senior (RS) | F | 6' 1" (1.85 m) | 185 lb (84 kg) | 2000-12-05 | Anchorage, Alaska | Alaska Anchorage (NCAA) | — |
| 18 | (Russia) | Ilia Morozov | Freshman | F | 6' 3" (1.91 m) | 196 lb (89 kg) | 2008-08-03 | Moskva, Russia | Tri-City Storm (USHL) | — |
| 19 | (United States) | Doug Grimes | Junior | F | 6' 3" (1.91 m) | 205 lb (93 kg) | 2002-04-18 | Brookline, Massachusetts | Boston University (HEA) | — |
| 20 | (United States) | David Deputy | Freshman | F | 5' 9" (1.75 m) | 185 lb (84 kg) | 2004-06-25 | Gurnee, Illinois | Muskegon Lumberjacks (USHL) | — |
| 21 | (United States) | Bradley Walker | Freshman | F | 6' 1" (1.85 m) | 194 lb (88 kg) | 2004-12-13 | Orono, Minnesota | Waterloo Black Hawks (USHL) | — |
| 23 | (Canada) | Brayden Morrison | Senior | F | 5' 11" (1.8 m) | 175 lb (79 kg) | 2002-05-04 | Calgary, Alberta | Dubuque Fighting Saints (USHL) | — |
| 26 | (United States) | Blake Mesenburg | Senior | F | 5' 11" (1.8 m) | 183 lb (83 kg) | 2002-06-05 | Orono, Minnesota | St. Cloud Norsemen (NAHL) | — |
| 29 | (Slovakia) | Shika Gadžijev | Freshman | G | 6' 2" (1.88 m) | 174 lb (79 kg) | 2004-10-26 | Makhachkala, Russia | Muskegon Lumberjacks (USHL) | — |
| 33 | (Sweden) | Casper Nässén | Sophomore | F | 6' 4" (1.93 m) | 205 lb (93 kg) | 2004-04-11 | Norrtälje, Sweden | Frölunda HC J20 (J20 Nationell) | BOS, 214th overall 2023 |
| 35 | (United States) | Benji Motew | Freshman | G | 6' 0" (1.83 m) | 185 lb (84 kg) | 2004-11-24 | Glencoe, Illinois | Corpus Christi IceRays (NAHL) | — |
| 43 | (Canada) | Ryder Thompson | Freshman | D | 5' 11" (1.8 m) | 183 lb (83 kg) | 2004-06-18 | Russell, Manitoba | Portland Winterhawks (WHL) | — |
| 45 | (Canada) | Matteo Drobac | Sophomore | G | 6' 2" (1.88 m) | 201 lb (91 kg) | 2003-08-07 | Oakville, Ontario | Western Ontario (OUA) | — |
| 68 | (Canada) | Ethan Hay | Freshman | F | 6' 1" (1.85 m) | 194 lb (88 kg) | 2005-01-15 | Waterloo, Ontario | Kingston Frontenacs (OHL) | TBL, 211th overall 2023 |
| 71 | (Russia) | Vladislav Lukashevich | Sophomore | D | 6' 1" (1.85 m) | 172 lb (78 kg) | 2003-05-23 | Magadan, Russia | Michigan State (Big Ten) | FLA, 120th overall 2021 |
| 73 | (United States) | Michael Phelan | Freshman | D | 6' 0" (1.83 m) | 176 lb (80 kg) | 2006-05-04 | Hinsdale, Illinois | Waterloo Black Hawks (USHL) | — |
| 81 | (United States) | David Grosek | Sophomore | F | 6' 1" (1.85 m) | 190 lb (86 kg) | 2003-06-23 | Doylestown, Pennsylvania | Maine Nordiques (NAHL) | — |
| 91 | (Canada) | Matteo Giampa | Junior | F | 6' 1" (1.85 m) | 190 lb (86 kg) | 2003-09-03 | Virgil, Ontario | Canisius (AHA) | — |

=== Hobey Baker Award winners ===
- Andy Miele – 2011

=== All-Americans ===
The following players have been named First or Second Team All-Americans by the American Hockey Coaches Association:

Note: Italics indicate a player is still an active RedHawk.

- Austin Czarnik – 2014 Second Team
- Austin Czarnik – 2013 First Team
- Reilly Smith – 2012 First Team
- Andy Miele – 2011 First Team
- Carter Camper – 2011 Second Team
- Cody Reichard – 2010 Second Team
- Carter Camper – 2009 Second Team
- Ryan Jones – 2008 First Team
- Alec Martinez – 2008 Second Team
- Nathan Davis – 2007 Second Team
- Andy Greene – 2005 Second Team and 2006 First Team
- Derek Edwardson – 2004 Second Team
- Dan Boyle – 1997 and 1998 First Team
- Randy Robitaille – 1997 First Team
- Chuck Thuss – 1995 First Team
- Brian Savage – 1993 Second Team
- Bob Marshall – 1993 Second Team

=== Conference awards ===
The following RedHawk players won a major conference award:

- Blake Mesenburg – 2025-26 NCHC Sportsmanship Award
- Ludvig Persson – 2020-21 NCHC Three Stars Award
- Karch Bachman – 2019-20 NCHC Senior Scholar-Athlete Award
- Anthony Louis – 2016-17 NCHC Forward of the Year
- Sean Kuraly – 2015-16 NCHC Defensive Forward of the Year
- Cody Reichard – 2009–10 CCHA Player of the Year
- Will Weber – 2009–10 CCHA Best Defensive Defenseman
- Tommy Wingels – 2009–10 CCHA Best Defensive Forward
- Andy Greene – 2007–08 CCHA Best Defensive Defenseman
- Alec Martinez – 2007–08 CCHA Best Defensive Defenseman
- Nathan Davis – 2006–07 CCHA Best Defensive Forward
- Andy Greene – 2005–06 CCHA Best Offensive Defenseman
- Andy Greene – 2004–05 CCHA Best Offensive Defenseman
- Derek Edwardson – 2003–04 CCHA Player of the Year
- Ernie Hartlieb – 1998–99 Terry Flanagan Award
- Dan Boyle – 1997–98 CCHA Best Offensive Defenseman
- Chuck Thuss – 1994–95 Terry Flanagan Award
- Chris Bergeron – 1992–93 CCHA Best Defensive Forward
- Joe Cook – 1992–93 CCHA Best Offensive Defenseman
- Bob Marshall – 1992–93 CCHA Best Defensive Defenseman
- Brian Savage – 1992–93 CCHA Player of the Year

== Olympians ==
This is a list of Miami alumni were a part of an Olympic team.

| Name | Position | Miami Tenure | Team | Year | Finish |
|---|---|---|---|---|---|
| Brian Savage | Left wing | 1990–1993 | (Canada) CAN | 1994 | Silver |
| Dan Boyle | Defenseman | 1994–1998 | (Canada) CAN | 2010 | Gold |
| Andy Miele | Center | 2007–2011 | (United States) USA | 2022 | 5th |

== RedHawks in the NHL ==
As of July 1, 2025.

| = NHL All-Star team | = NHL All-Star | = NHL All-Star and NHL All-Star team | = Hall of Famers |

| Player | Position | Team(s) | Years | Games | Stanley Cups |
|---|---|---|---|---|---|
| Kevyn Adams | Center | TOR, CBJ, FLA, CAR, PHO, CHI | 1997–2008 | 540 | 1 |
| Riley Barber | Forward | WSH, MTL, DET | 2016–2022 | 16 | 0 |
| Louie Belpedio | Defenseman | MIN, PHI | 2017–2024 | 16 | 0 |
| Dan Boyle | Defenseman | FLA, TBL, SJS, NYR | 1998–2016 | 1,093 | 1 |
| Carter Camper | Forward | BOS | 2011–2012 | 3 | 0 |
| Patrick Cannone | Forward | MIN | 2016–2017 | 3 | 0 |
| Alain Chevrier | Goaltender | NJD, WPG, CHI, PIT, DET | 1985–1991 | 234 | 0 |
| Blake Coleman | Center | NJD, TBL, CGY | 2016–Present | 624 | 2 |
| Austin Czarnik | Center | BOS, CGY, NYI, SEA, DET | 2016–2024 | 205 | 0 |
| Craig Fisher | Left wing | PHI, WPG, FLA | 1989–1997 | 12 | 0 |
| Mike Glumac | Right wing | STL | 2005–2008 | 40 | 0 |
| Andy Greene | Defenseman | NJD, NYI | 2006–2022 | 1,057 | 0 |
| Jonathan Gruden | Center | PIT | 2022–2024 | 16 | 0 |
| Todd Harkins | Center | CGY, HFD | 1991–1994 | 48 | 0 |
| Grant Hutton | Defenseman | NYI | 2021–Present | 31 | 0 |
| Ryan Jones | Left wing | NSH, EDM | 2008–2014 | 334 | 0 |
| Connor Knapp | Goaltender | BUF | 2013–2014 | 2 | 0 |
| Sean Kuraly | Center | BOS, CBJ | 2016–Present | 562 | 0 |
| Pat Leahy | Right wing | BOS, NSH | 2003–2007 | 50 | 0 |

| Player | Position | Team(s) | Years | Games | Stanley Cups |
|---|---|---|---|---|---|
| Alec Martinez | Defenseman | LAK, VGK CHI | 2009–Present | 862 | 3 |
| Curtis McKenzie | Left wing | DAL | 2014–2018 | 99 | 0 |
| Steve McKichan | Goaltender | VAN | 1990–1991 | 1 | 0 |
| Justin Mercier | Left wing | COL | 2009–2010 | 9 | 0 |
| Carson Meyer | Right Wing | CBJ | 2021–2024 | 41 | 0 |
| Andy Miele | Forward | PHO | 2011–2014 | 15 | 0 |
| Jarod Palmer | Right wing | MIN | 2011–2012 | 6 | 0 |
| Rob Robinson | Defenseman | STL | 1991–1992 | 22 | 0 |
| Randy Robitaille | Center | BOS, NSH, LAK, PIT, NYI, ATL, MIN, PHI, OTT | 1996–2008 | 531 | 0 |
| Todd Rohloff | Defenseman | WAS, CBJ | 1997–1998 | 75 | 0 |
| Jack Roslovic | Center | WPG, CBJ, NYR, CAR | 2016–Present | 526 | 0 |
| Brian Savage | Left wing | MTL, PHO, STL, PHI | 1993–2006 | 674 | 0 |
| Cameron Schilling | Defenseman | WAS, WPG | 2012–2019 | 10 | 0 |
| Kiefer Sherwood | Left wing | ANA, COL, NSH, VAN | 2018–Present | 265 | 0 |
| Richard Shulmistra | Goaltender | NJD, FLA | 1997–2000 | 2 | 0 |
| Reilly Smith | Right wing | DAL, BOS, FLA,VGK, PIT | 2011–Present | 919 | 1 |
| Chris Wideman | Left wing | OTT, EDM, FLA, MTL | 2015–2023 | 291 | 0 |
| Tommy Wingels | Center | SJS, OTT, CHI, BOS | 2010–2018 | 448 | 0 |
| Jeff Zatkoff | Goaltender | PIT, LAK | 2013–2017 | 48 | 1 |

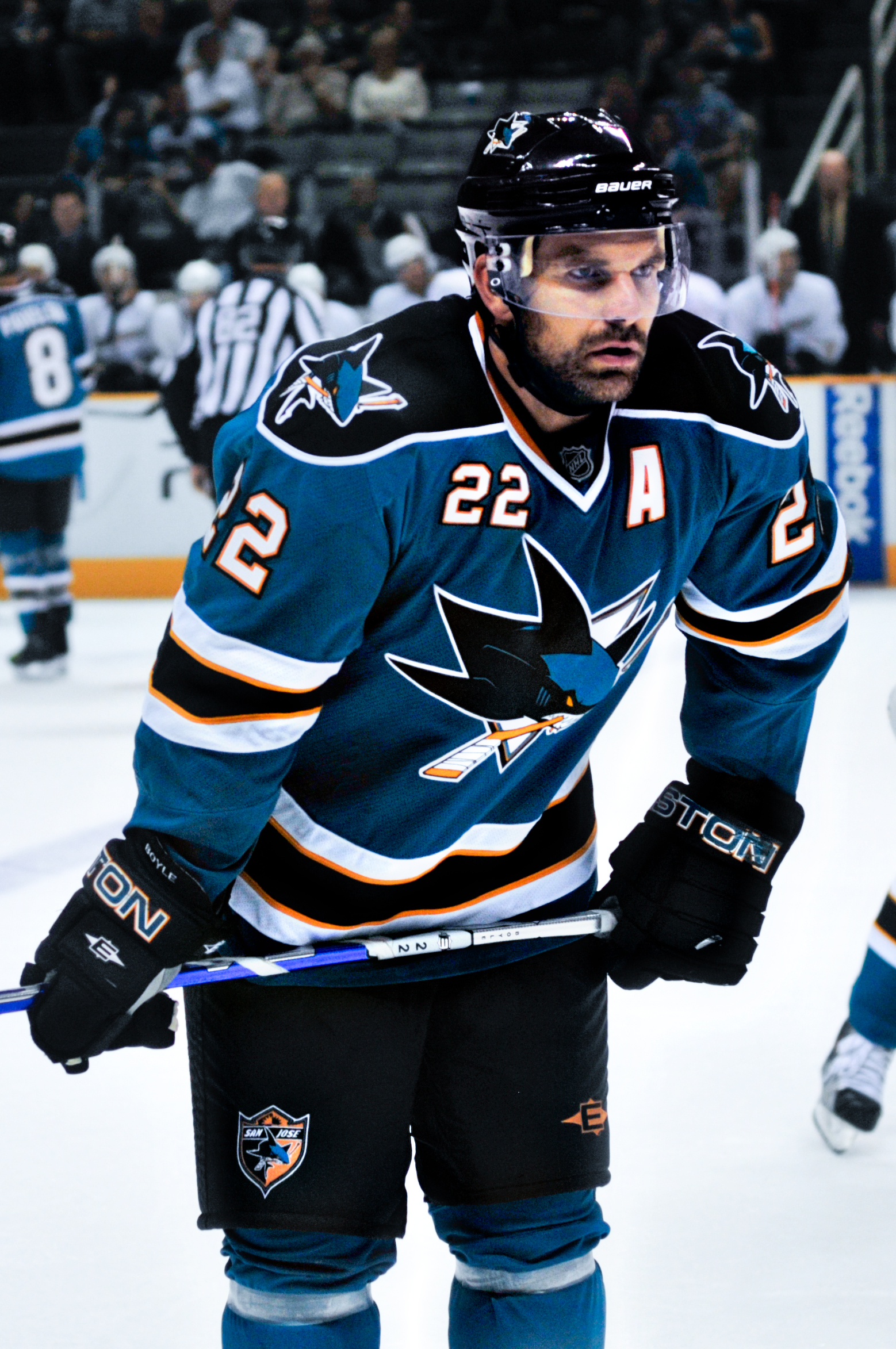
Dan Boyle

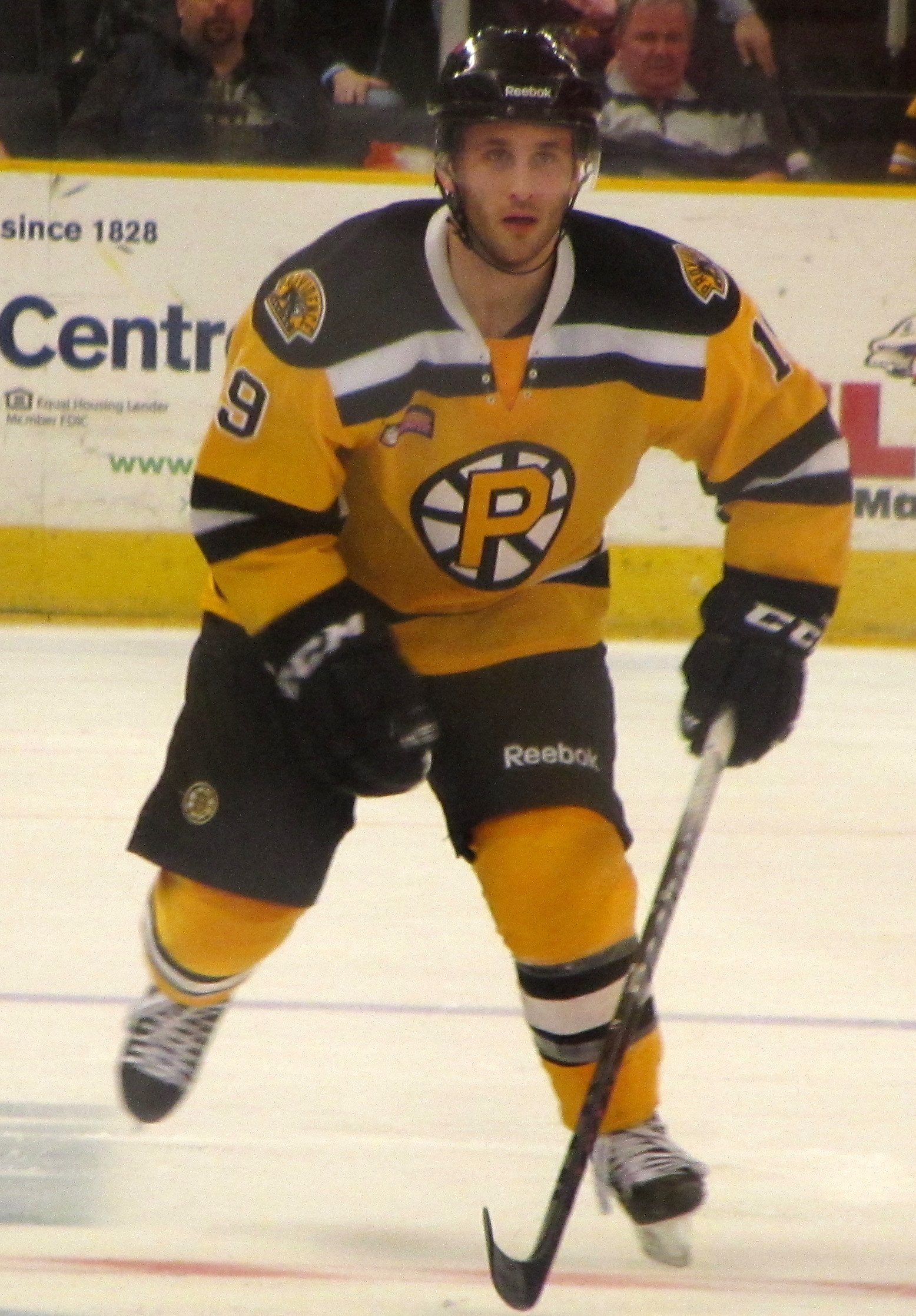
Carter Camper

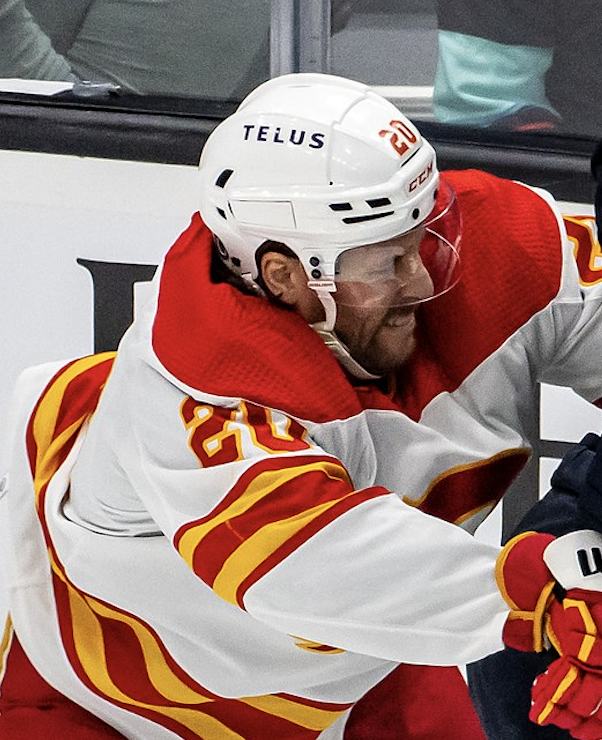
Blake Coleman

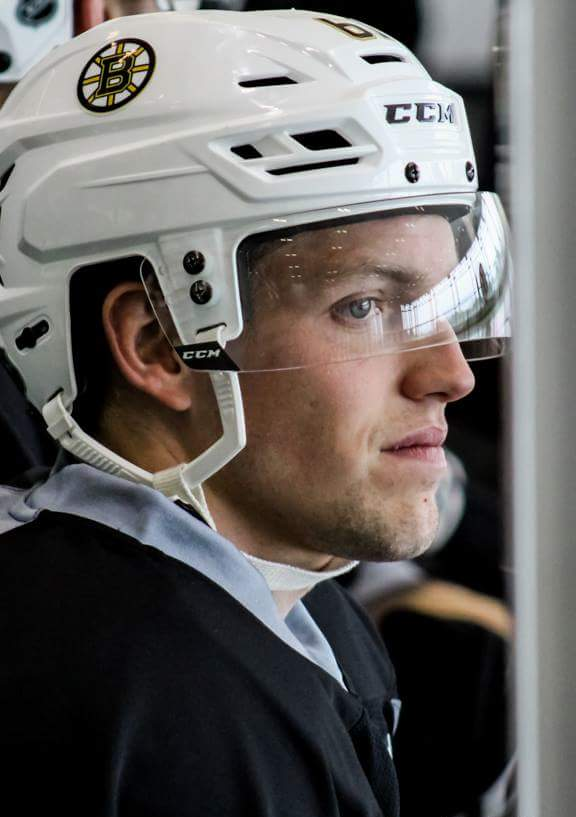
Austin Czarnik

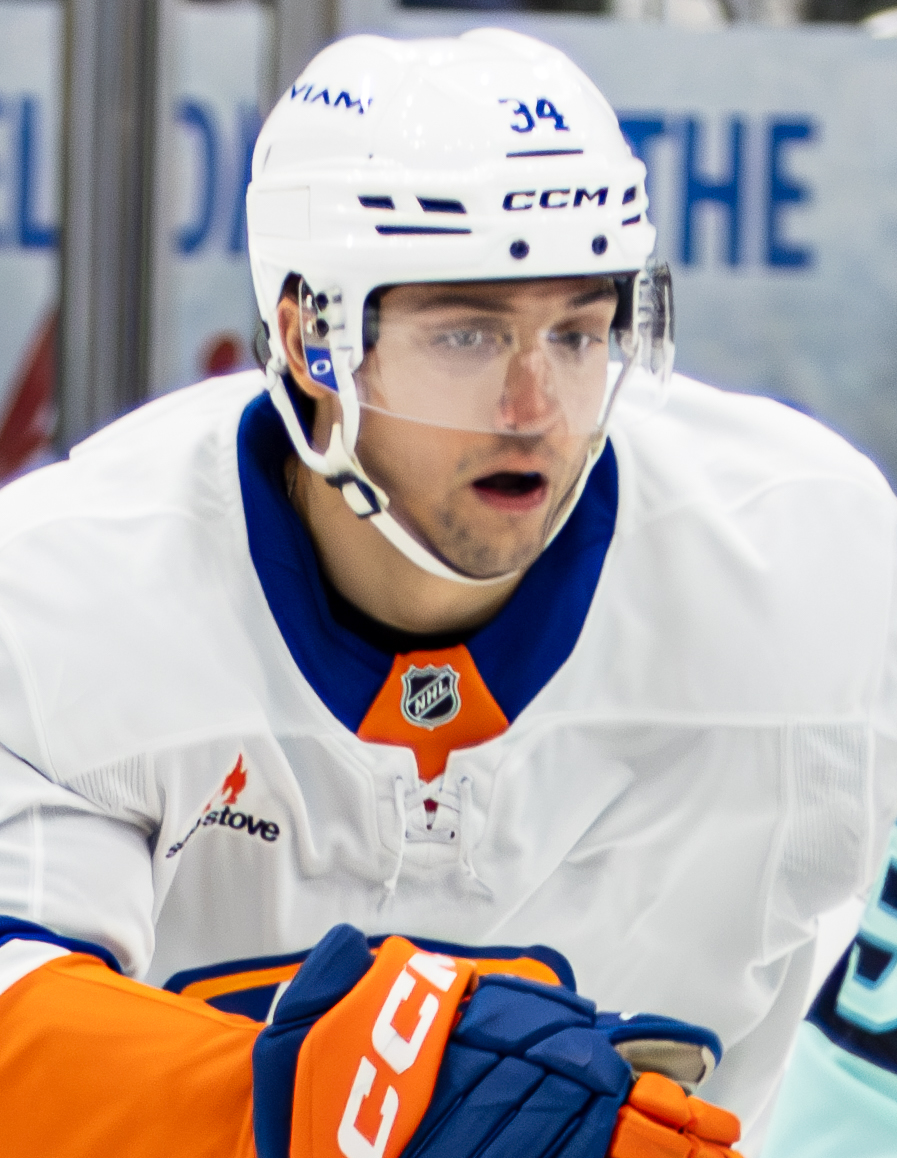
Grant Hutton

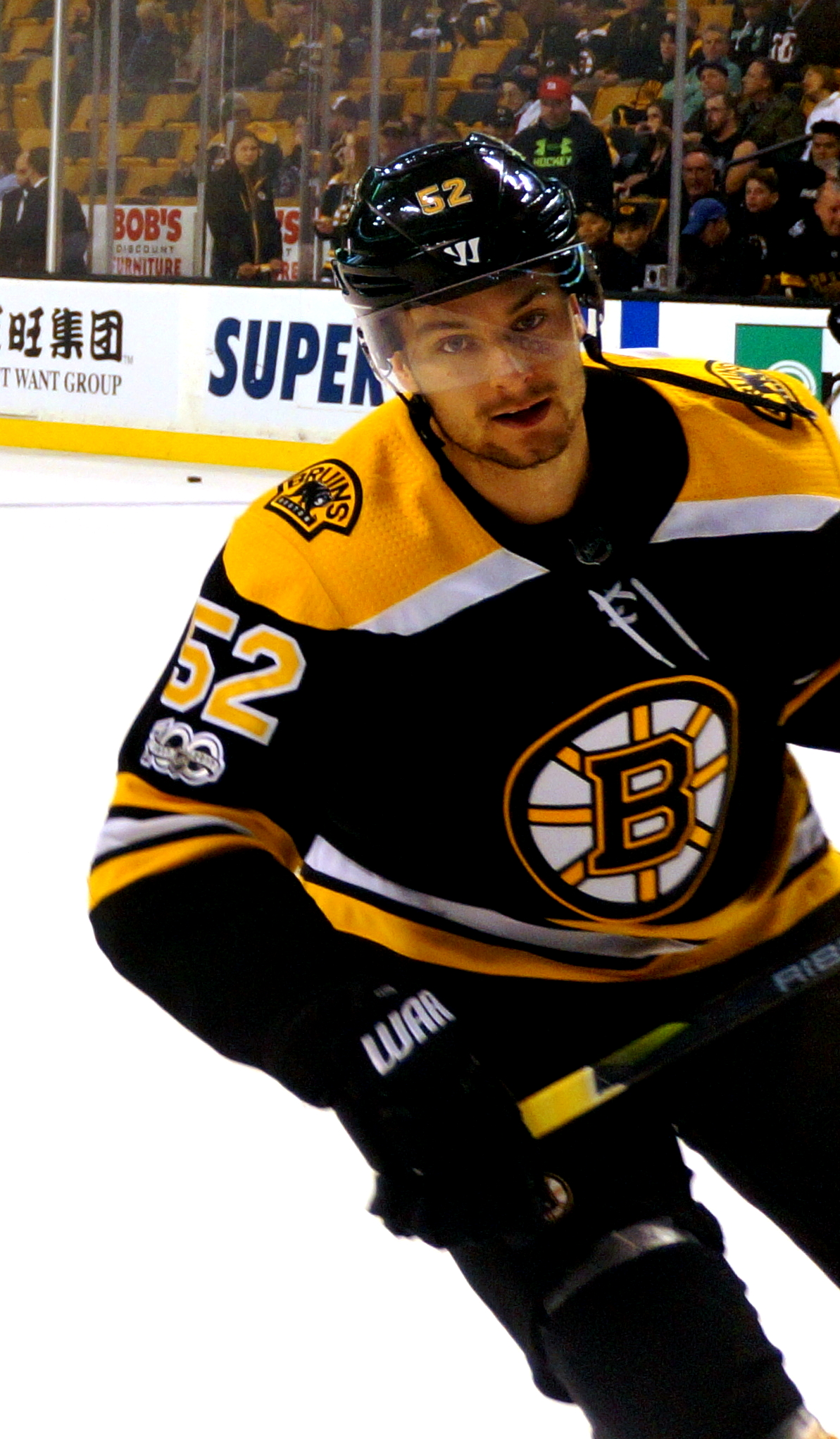
Sean Kuraly

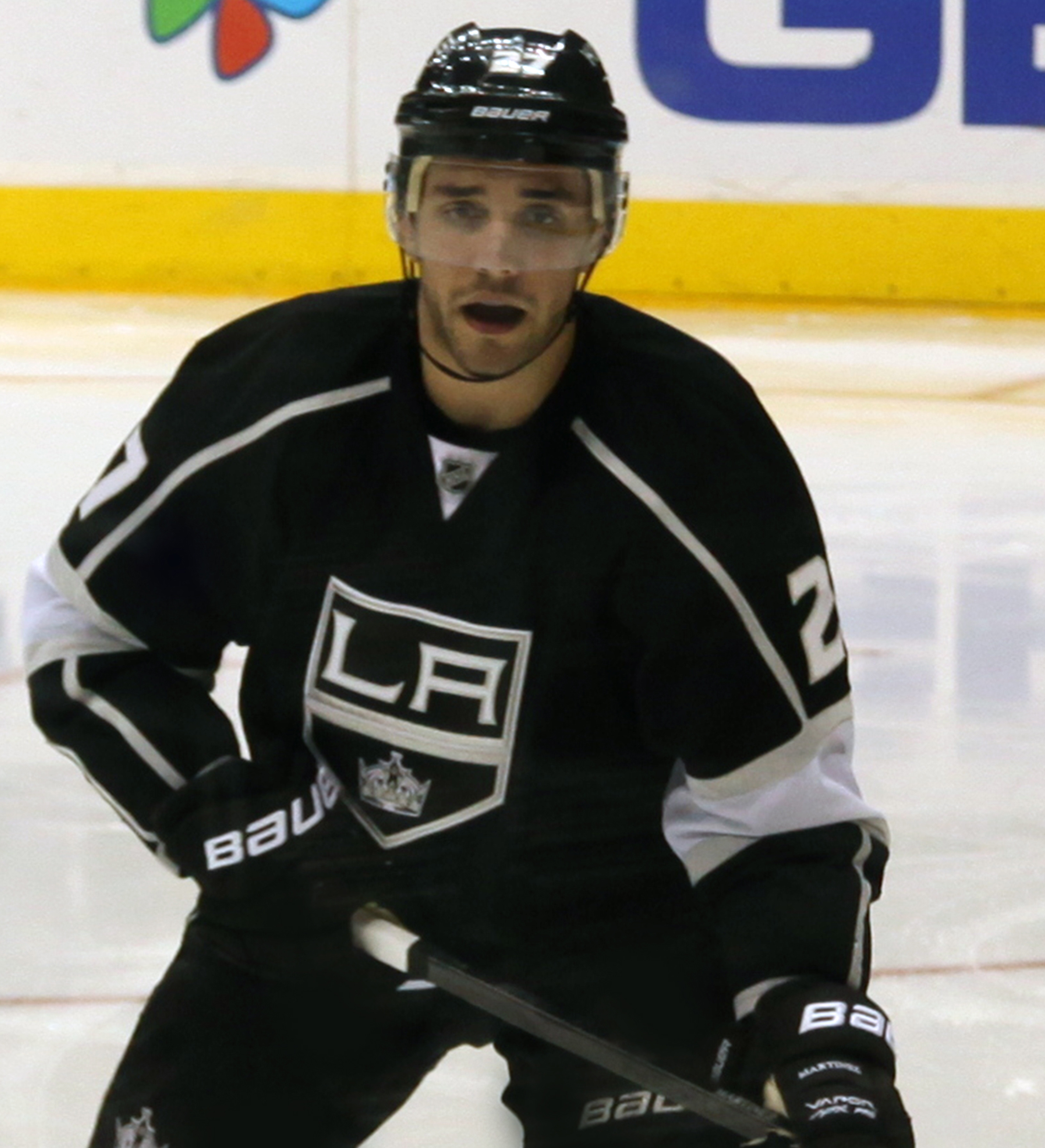
Alec Martinez

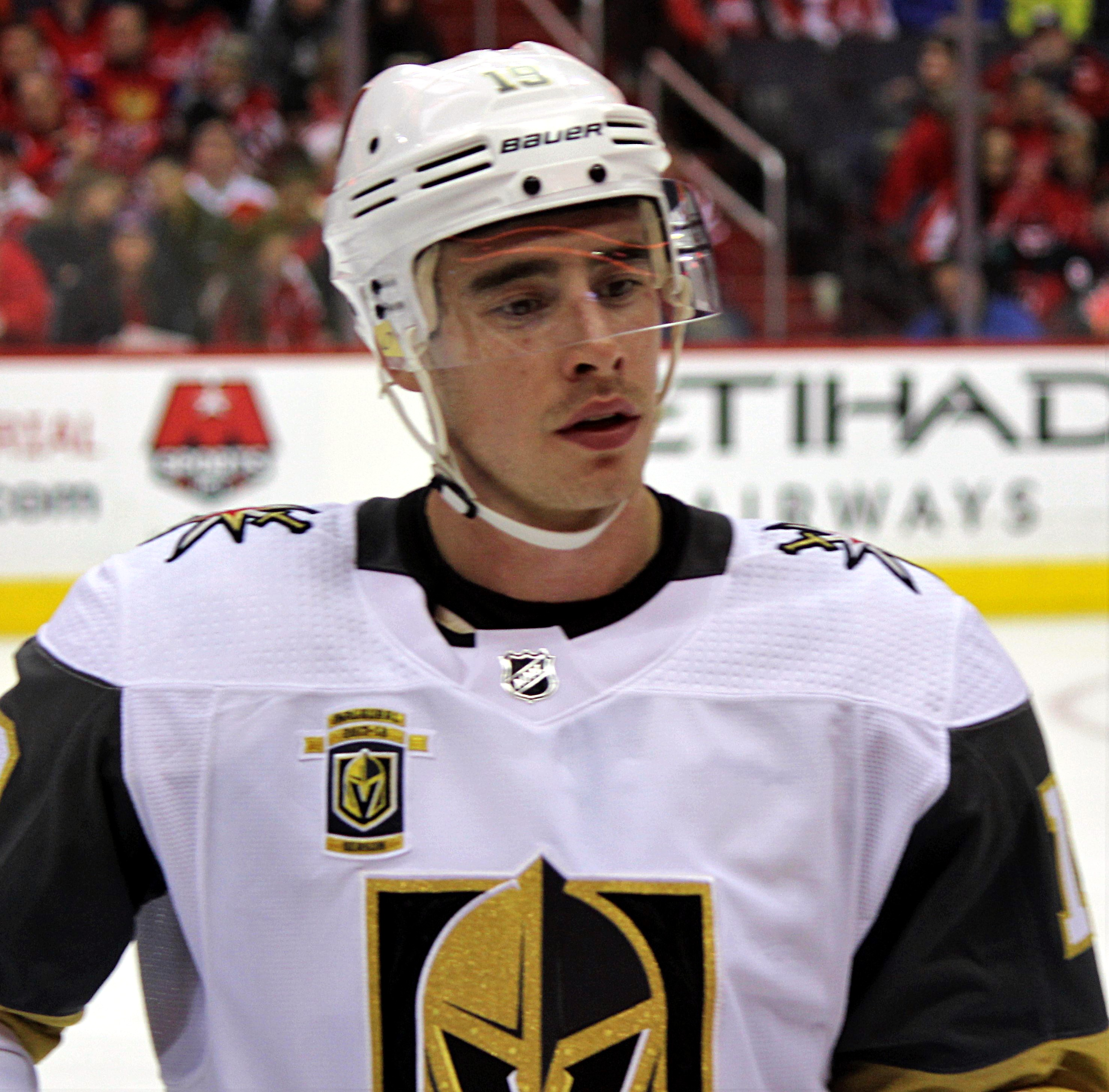
Reilly Smith

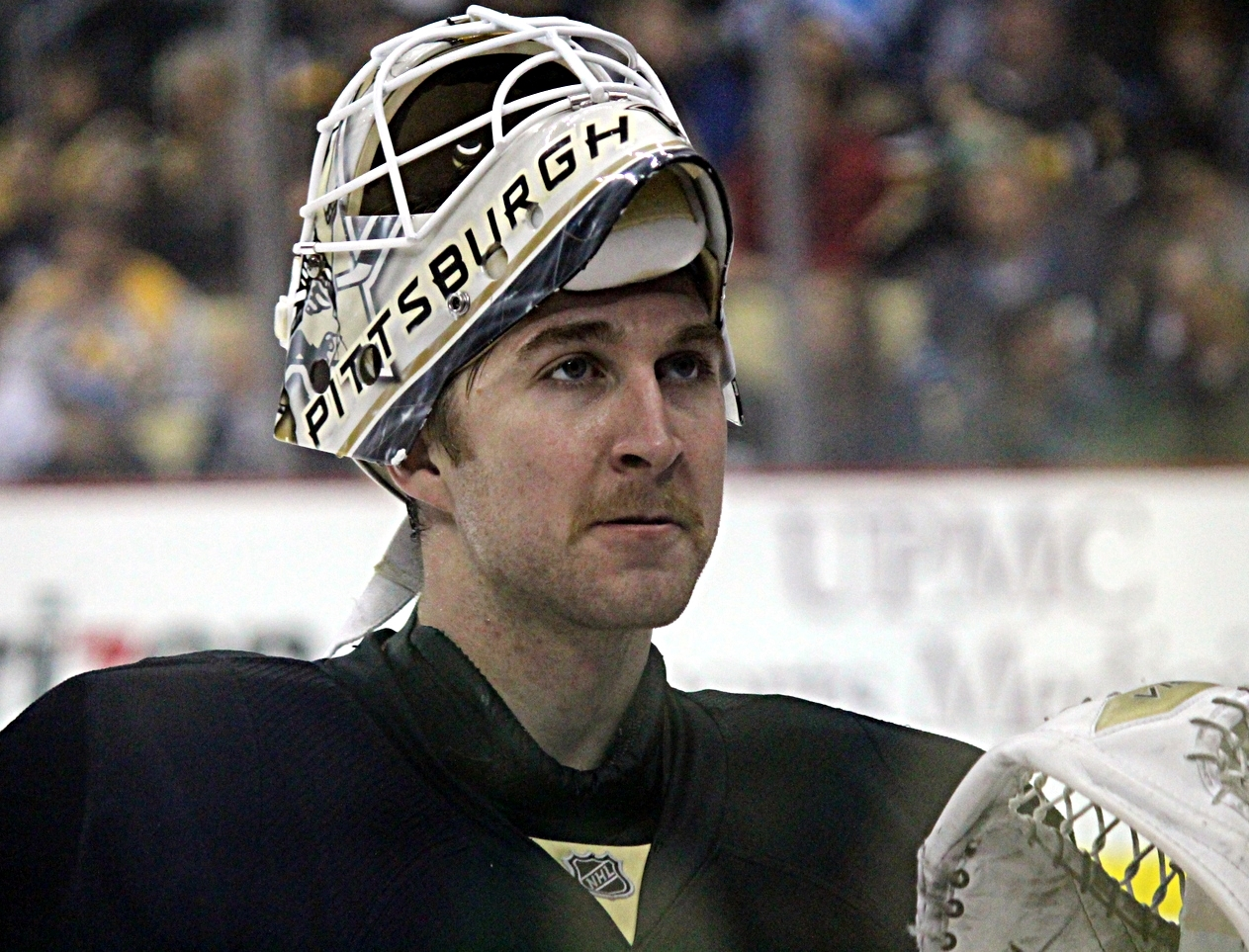
Jeff Zatkoff

== School records ==
The following are the Miami school records. Statistics are accurate as of the 2009–10 season.

Note: Italics indicate a player is still an active RedHawk.

=== Individual records ===
==== Career ====
- Most goals in a career: Rick Kuraly, 101 (1979–83)
- Most assists in a career: Steve Morris, 138 (1979–83)
- Most points in a career: Steve Morris, 202 (1979–83)
- Most power-play goals in a career: Rick Kuraly, 36 (1979–83)
- Most short handed goals in a career: Nathan Davis, (2004–2008)
- Most penalty minutes in a career: Vern Sketchley, 338 (1978–82)
- Most wins in a career: David Burleigh, 60 (1999–03)
- Highest save percentage in a career: Jeff Zatkoff, .927 (2005–08)
- Best goals against average in a career: Jeff Zatkoff, 1.96 (2005–08)

==== Season ====
- Most goals in a season: Gary Delonge, 39 (1978–79)
- Most assists in a season: John Malloy, 52 (1978–79)
- Most points in a season: Gary Delonge, 74 (1978–79)
- Most power-play goals in a season: Steve Morris, 17 (1981–82)
- Most short handed goals in a season: Randy Robitaille, 7 (1996–97)
- Most penalty minutes in a season: Todd Harkins, 133 (1987–88)
- Most wins in a season: Jeff Zatkoff, 27 (2007–08)
- Highest save percentage in a season: Jeff Zatkoff, .933 (2007–08)
- Best goals against average in a season: Jeff Zatkoff, 1.72 (2007–08)

==== Game ====
- Most goals in a game: Rick Kuraly, 5 (2/20/81 vs. Lake Forest)
- Most assists in a game: 2 players tied with 6
- Most points in a game: Gary Delonge, 8 (2/24/79 vs. Cincinnati)
- Most saves in a game: Lee Cannon, 57 (11/18/89 vs. Western Michigan)

=== Team records ===
==== Season ====
- Most wins in a season: 33 (2007–08)
- Fewest wins in a season: 5 (1990–91)
- Most goals in a season: 247 (1978–79)
- Fewest goals allowed in a season: 101 (2002–03)

==== Game ====
- Longest winning streak: 10 (1/7/94 to 2/5/94)
- Longest unbeaten streak: 10 (1/21/06 to 2/24/06)
- Most goals in a game: 19 (2/23/80 vs. Eastern Michigan)
- Most goals in a period: 9 (11/18/78 vs. Kent State)
