= Connor Knapp =

American ice hockey player

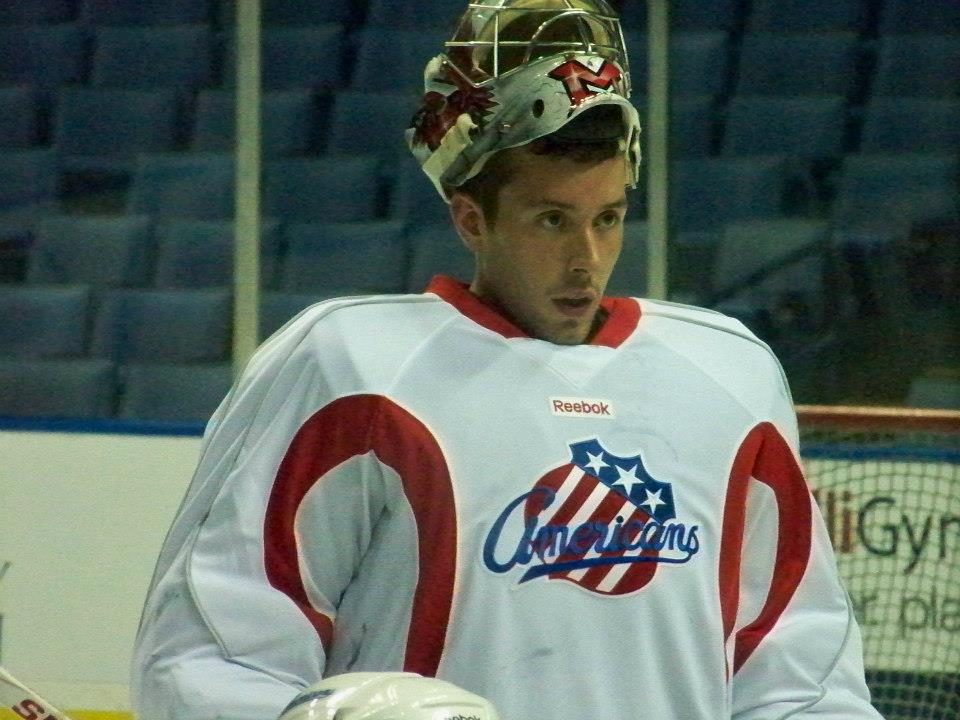
- Knapp in 2013
- Born: May 1, 1990 (age 36) York, New York, U.S.
- Height: 6 ft 6 in (198 cm)
- Weight: 225 lb (102 kg; 16 st 1 lb)
- Position: Goaltender
- Caught: Left
- Played for: Buffalo Sabres
- NHL draft: 164th overall, 2009; Buffalo Sabres
- Playing career: 2012–2017

Connor Knapp (born May 1, 1990) is an American former professional ice hockey goaltender. Knapp was selected by the Buffalo Sabres in the 6th round (164th overall) of the 2009 NHL entry draft and played two games in the NHL, both for the Sabres in 2014.

== Playing career ==
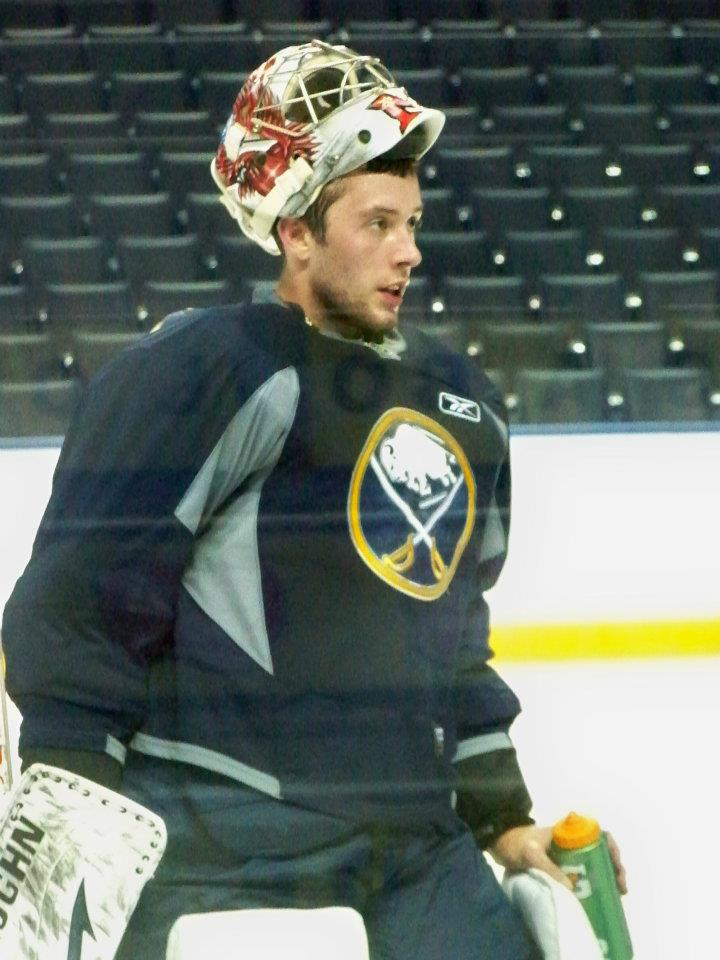
Knapp with the Buffalo Sabres

Knapp won the State Championship in 2005 with McQuaid Jesuit High School, which he attended for his freshman and sophomore year. He played four seasons with the Miami RedHawks men's ice hockey team of the Central Collegiate Hockey Association (CCHA).

On April 3, 2012, Knapp signed a two-year entry-level contract with the Buffalo Sabres of the National Hockey League (NHL) and was assigned to their AHL affiliate, the Rochester Americans.

On April 12, 2014, Knapp made his NHL debut when he entered the Buffalo Sabres' net, in relief of the injured Matt Hackett, with 11:35 remaining in a 4–1 loss to the Boston Bruins. By dressing Knapp for the game, he became the ninth goaltender to dress for the Sabres during the 2013–14 NHL season (sixth to play) and established the NHL record for most goaltenders dressed by one team in a single season. Knapp played the entirety of the Sabres' final game of the season against the New York Islanders, a 4–3 shootout loss.

Knapp was designated a restricted free agent, but was not tendered an offer by the Buffalo Sabers prior to the 2014–15 season. On August 6, 2014, as an unrestricted free agent, he signed a one-year AHL contract with the Lehigh Valley Phantoms.

After two seasons within the Lehigh Valley Phantoms organization in which he spent the majority of his tenure with ECHL affiliate, the Reading Royals, Knapp left as a free agent to sign a one-year deal with fellow ECHL club, the Norfolk Admirals, on September 14, 2016. In the 2016–17 season, Knapp appeared in 14 games with the Admirals with just 2 wins before he was released on December 19, 2016.

== Career statistics ==
			Regular season									Playoffs
Season	Team	League	GP	W	L	T/OT	MIN	GA	SO	GAA	SV%	GP	W	L	MIN	GA	SO	GAA	SV%
2007–08	Boston Jr. Bruins	EJHL	25	14	7	2	1309	44	3	2.02	.925	—	—	—	—	—	—	—	—
2008–09	Miami Redhawks	CCHA	23	13	5	3	1350	47	2	2.09	.904	—	—	—	—	—	—	—	—
2009–10	Miami Redhawks	CCHA	20	10	4	4	1127	37	4	1.97	.921	—	—	—	—	—	—	—	—
2010–11	Miami Redhawks	CCHA	17	8	5	4	975	33	2	2.03	.909	—	—	—	—	—	—	—	—
2011–12	Miami Redhawks	CCHA	24	15	8	0	1348	38	5	1.69	.933	—	—	—	—	—	—	—	—
2012–13	Rochester Americans	AHL	7	1	6	0	413	23	0	3.34	.893	—	—	—	—	—	—	—	—
2012–13	Greenville Road Warriors	ECHL	12	5	7	0	728	37	0	3.05	.909	4	1	3	221	10	0	2.71	.922
2013–14	Greenville Road Warriors	ECHL	16	7	7	2	957	37	1	2.32	.933	—	—	—	—	—	—	—	—
2013–14	Florida Everblades	ECHL	11	2	5	3	583	30	0	3.09	.888	—	—	—	—	—	—	—	—
2013–14	Alaska Aces	ECHL	2	2	0	0	120	3	0	1.50	.947	—	—	—	—	—	—	—	—
2013–14	Rochester Americans	AHL	3	0	3	0	178	12	0	4.04	.876	—	—	—	—	—	—	—	—
2013–14	Buffalo Sabres	NHL	2	0	0	1	77	4	0	3.12	.875	—	—	—	—	—	—	—	—
2014–15	Reading Royals	ECHL	41	24	11	4	2369	102	1	2.58	.915	7	3	4	443	18	0	2.44	.919
2015–16	Reading Royals	ECHL	22	10	10	1	1195	59	2	2.96	.899	—	—	—	—	—	—	—	—
2015–16	Lehigh Valley Phantoms	AHL	2	1	0	0	113	10	0	5.31	.821	—	—	—	—	—	—	—	—
2016–17	Norfolk Admirals	ECHL	14	2	10	0	774	47	0	3.65	.893	—	—	—	—	—	—	—	—
NHL totals			2	0	0	1	77	4	0	3.12	.875	—	—	—	—	—	—	—	—

== Awards and honours ==
Award	Year
CCHA All-Rookie Team	2008–09
CCHA Best Goaltender	2011–12

Awards and achievements
Preceded by Shawn Hunwick	CCHA Best Goaltender; 2011–12	Succeeded by Brady Hjelle
