= Shawn Hunwick =

American ice hockey player

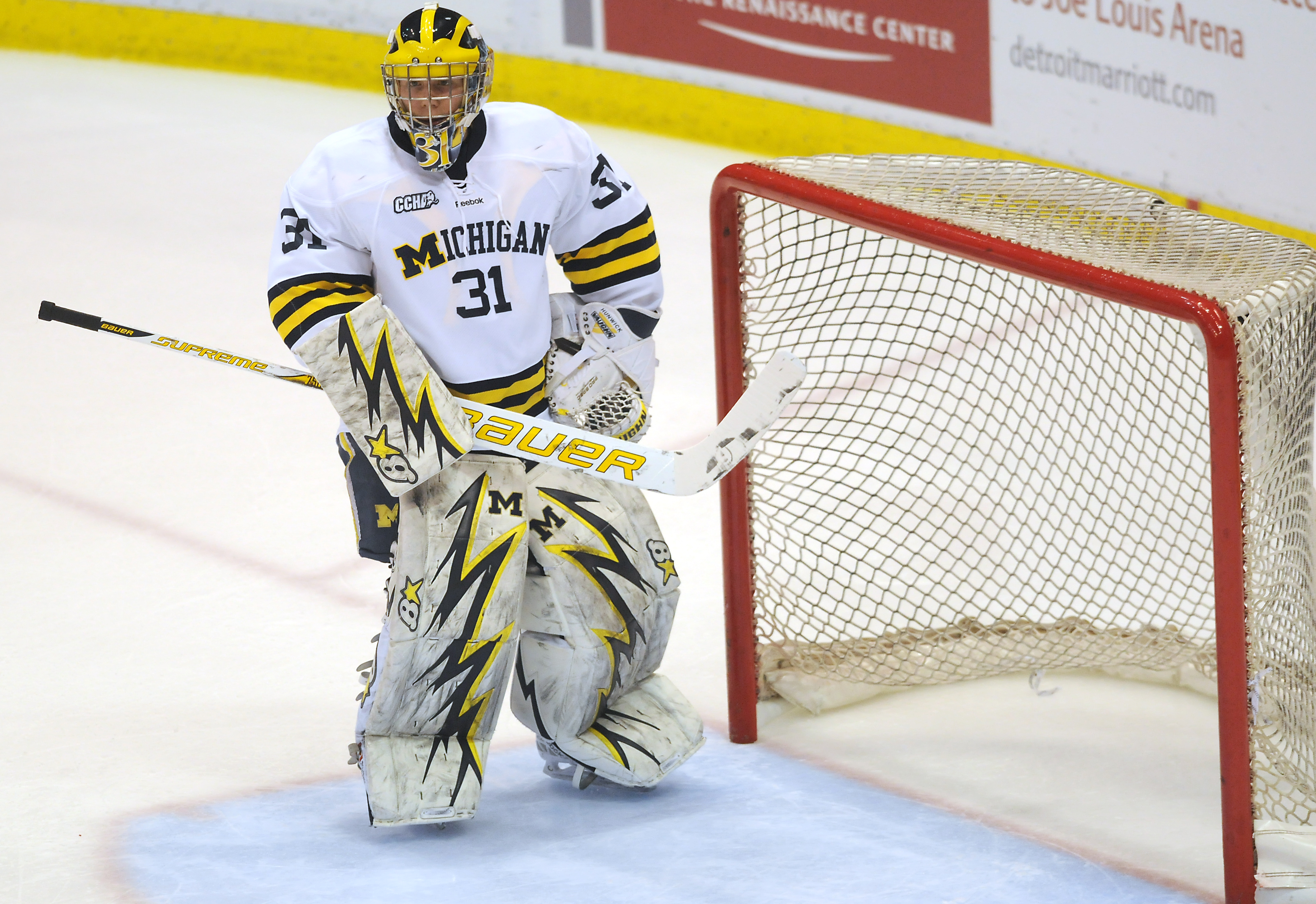
- Hunwick with the Michigan Wolverines
- Born: April 9, 1987 (age 39) Sterling Heights, Michigan, U.S.
- Height: 5 ft 7 in (170 cm)
- Weight: 163 lb (74 kg; 11 st 9 lb)
- Position: Goaltender
- Caught: Left
- Played for: Columbus Blue Jackets; Iserlohn Roosters; Michigan Wolverines
- NHL draft: Undrafted
- Playing career: 2012–2013

Shawn Richard Hunwick (born April 9, 1987) is an American former professional ice hockey goaltender. He played in one National Hockey League (NHL) game with the Columbus Blue Jackets during the 2011–12 season, appearing for just three minutes. He also played professionally in the ECHL, the European Trophy, and the Deutsche Eishockey Liga (DEL). He is the younger brother of former Wolverines team captain Matt Hunwick, who played for seven clubs in the National Hockey League between 2007 and 2019.

== Playing career ==
As a youth, Hunwick played in the 2001 Quebec International Pee-Wee Hockey Tournament with the Detroit Honeybaked minor ice hockey team.

=== College ===
Hunwick played for the Michigan Wolverines in the CCHA. Hunwick joined the team as a walk-on in 2007–08 and saw little playing time. After redshirting the 2008–09 season, Hunwick made his debut at the end of the 2009–10 season after starter Bryan Hogan was injured against Notre Dame. Hunwick led his team to a CCHA tournament title, where he won tournament Most Valuable Player (MVP). He then led the Wolverines into the NCAA tournament for Michigan's 20th consecutive appearance, where Michigan lost to Miami. During the next season, he led the team to the NCAA title game, where they lost 3–2 in overtime to Minnesota-Duluth. In 2011-12, he was named one of the ten finalists for the Hobey Baker Award.

=== Professional ===
Hunwick's professional career started only days after his college career came to an end. On March 28, 2012, Hunwick was signed to an amateur try-out contract by the Columbus Blue Jackets after starting goaltender Steve Mason was injured during practice.

On March 29, 2012, in the context of season-ending injuries to two goaltenders in the Blue Jackets' system – Mark Dekanich and Curtis Sanford – and the continued questionable availability of Mason, Hunwick was signed to a one-year professional contract with the Blue Jackets running through the conclusion of the 2011-2012 season.

Hunwick made his NHL debut, coming on to replace Mason for the final 2:33, in a 7–3 home victory over the New York Islanders, on April 7, 2012.

In July 2012, Hunwick signed a try-out contract with EC Red Bull Salzburg of the Austrian Hockey League. Hunwick made his debut for the Red Bulls, replacing goalie Alex Auld in the third period of the second game of the European Trophy on August 19, 2012. Hunwick played for the entirety of the third period and allowed two goals.

On August 31, 2012, EC Red Bull Salzburg terminated Hunwick's contract and he was released from the team after only playing in three games.

In late September 2012, Hunwick was invited to the Providence Bruins' training camp. On October 5, 2012, Hunwick was sent down to play for the Bruins' ECHL affiliate, the South Carolina Stingrays. On October 7, Hunwick started in his first game with the Stingrays, a preseason game against the Gwinnett Gladiators. The Stingrays defeated the Gladiators 5–2, and Hunwick got the win, with 36 saves on 38 shots. In nine games, Hunwick posted four wins before he was traded to the Utah Grizzlies on November 19, 2012.

Hunwick played only two games with the Grizzlies before he was released to return to Europe, signing for the remainder of the 2012–13 season with the Iserlohn Roosters of the German DEL.

Hunwick announced his retirement from professional hockey on August 26, 2013.

== Career statistics ==
			Regular season									Playoffs
Season	Team	League	GP	W	L	T/OT	MIN	GA	SO	GAA	SV%	GP	W	L	MIN	GA	SO	GAA	SV%
2006–07	Alpena IceDiggers	NAHL	31	17	9	2	1708	87	1	3.06	.904	—	—	—	—	—	—	—	—
2007–08	University of Michigan	CCHA	1	0	0	0	3	0	0	0.00	1.000	—	—	—	—	—	—	—	—
2009–10	University of Michigan	CCHA	11	8	3	0	627	19	1	1.82	.918	—	—	—	—	—	—	—	—
2010–11	University of Michigan	CCHA	35	22	9	4	2087	77	4	2.21	.925	—	—	—	—	—	—	—	—
2011–12	University of Michigan	CCHA	40	24	12	3	2400	80	5	2.00	.932	—	—	—	—	—	—	—	—
2011–12	Columbus Blue Jackets	NHL	1	0	0	0	3	0	0	0.00	—	—	—	—	—	—	—	—	—
2012–13	South Carolina Stingrays	ECHL	9	4	4	0	493	24	1	2.92	.918	—	—	—	—	—	—	—	—
2012–13	Utah Grizzlies	ECHL	2	0	1	1	123	9	0	4.38	.830	—	—	—	—	—	—	—	—
2012–13	Iserlohn Roosters	DEL	8	2	4	0	399	24	0	3.60	.897	—	—	—	—	—	—	—	—
NHL totals			1	0	0	0	3	0	0	0.00	—	—	—	—	—	—	—	—	—

== Awards and honors ==
Award	Year
CCHA All-Tournament Team	2010
NCAA All-Tournament Team	2011
All-CCHA Second Team	2011–12

== See also ==
- List of players who played only one game in the NHL

Awards and achievements
Preceded by Jordan Pearce	CCHA Most Valuable Player in Tournament; 2010	Succeeded by Andy Miele
Preceded by Cody Reichard	CCHA Best Goaltender; 2010–11	Succeeded by Connor Knapp
