= Dan Dries =

American ice hockey player (born 1988)

- Born: April 12, 1988 (age 38) Lake Orion, Michigan, U.S.
- Height: 6 ft 0 in (183 cm)
- Weight: 194 lb (88 kg; 13 st 12 lb)
- Position: Forward
- Shot: Left
- Played for: St. John's IceCaps; Ilves
- NHL draft: Undrafted
- Playing career: 2012–2014

Dan Dries (born April 12, 1988) is an American former professional ice hockey player who most notably played in the American Hockey League (AHL) and Finnish Liiga.

== Playing career ==
Undrafted and having played collegiate hockey with the University of New Hampshire of the Hockey East and later the Ohio State University in the Central Collegiate Hockey Association, Dries made his professional debut at the tail end of the 2011–12 season, signing an amateur try-out with the St. John's IceCaps of the AHL.

On October 17, 2012, Dries signed a try-out agreement with Ilves of the SM-liiga. He played 13 games and registered 1 assist and 10 penalty minutes with the European team before returning to North America where he completed the 2012–13 season with the Orlando Solar Bears of the ECHL.

== Career statistics ==
			Regular season					Playoffs
Season	Team	League	GP	G	A	Pts	PIM	GP	G	A	Pts	PIM
2005–06	Traverse City North Stars	NAHL	24	6	3	9	48	—	—	—	—	—
2006–07	Ohio Junior Blue Jackets	USHL	6	1	2	3	22	—	—	—	—	—
2006–07	Cedar Rapids RoughRiders	USHL	21	12	2	14	70	6	1	1	2	6
2007–08	University of New Hampshire	HE	37	11	17	28	44	—	—	—	—	—
2008–09	University of New Hampshire	HE	34	10	11	21	87	—	—	—	—	—
2010–11	Ohio State University	CCHA	36	15	12	27	64	—	—	—	—	—
2011–12	Ohio State University	CCHA	28	13	9	22	34	—	—	—	—	—
2011–12	St. John's IceCaps	AHL	9	1	2	3	4	—	—	—	—	—
2012–13	Ilves	SM-l	13	0	1	1	10	—	—	—	—	—
2012–13	Orlando Solar Bears	ECHL	10	1	5	6	8	—	—	—	—	—
2013–14	Kalamazoo Wings	ECHL	2	0	0	0	8	—	—	—	—	—
2013–14	Ontario Reign	ECHL	5	4	3	7	2	—	—	—	—	—
Liiga totals			13	0	1	1	10	—	—	—	—	—
