= Northern Michigan Wildcats men's ice hockey statistical leaders =

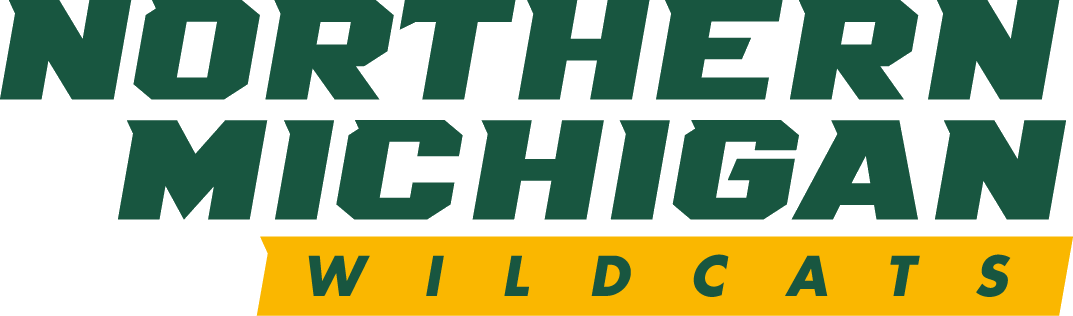

The Northern Michigan Wildcats men's ice hockey statistical leaders are individual statistical leaders of the Northern Michigan Wildcats men's ice hockey program in various categories, including goals, assists, points, and saves. Within those areas, the lists identify single-game, single-season, and career leaders. The Wildcats represent Northern Michigan University in the NCAA's Central Collegiate Hockey Association.

Northern Michigan began competing in intercollegiate ice hockey in 1976. These lists are updated through the end of the 2022–23 season.

== Goals ==
Career
Rk	Player	Goals	Seasons
1	Gary Emmons	130	1983–84 1984–85 1985–86 1986–87
2	Bill Joyce	112	1976–77 1977–78 1978–79 1979–80
3	Scott Beattie	106	1989–90 1990–91 1991–92
4	Dallas Drake	92	1988–89 1989–90 1990–91 1991–92
5	Steve Bozek	89	1978–79 1979–80 1980–81
6	Mike Mielke	86	1976–77 1977–78 1978–79 1979–80
	Phil Berger	86	1985–86 1986–87 1987–88 1988–89
8	Jeff Pyle	76	1978–79 1979–80 1980–81
	Jim Hiller	76	1989–90 1990–91 1991–92
10	Dean Antos	75	1987–88 1988–89 1989–90 1990–91

Season
Rk	Player	Goals	Season
1	Scott Beattie	48	1990–91
2	Gary Emmons	45	1985–86
3	Steve Bozek	42	1979–80
4	Bill Joyce	41	1979–80
5	Phil Berger	40	1987–88
6	Tony Szabo	39	1990–91
	Dallas Drake	39	1991–92
8	Steve Bozek	35	1980–81
	Jeff Pyle	35	1980–81
10	Gary Emmons	32	1986–87

Single Game
Rk	Player	Goals	Season	Opponent
1	Gary Emmons	6	1985–86	Minnesota

== Assists ==
Career
Rk	Player	Assists	Seasons
1	Mike Mielke	149	1976–77 1977–78 1978–79 1979–80
2	Bill Joyce	143	1976–77 1977–78 1978–79 1979–80
3	Jim Hiller	129	1989–90 1990–91 1991–92
4	Dallas Drake	128	1988–89 1989–90 1990–91 1991–92
5	Don Waddell	120	1976–77 1977–78 1978–79 1979–80
6	Jeff Pyle	117	1978–79 1979–80 1980–81
7	Scott Beattie	116	1989–90 1990–91 1991–92
8	Steve Bozek	114	1978–79 1979–80 1980–81
9	Gary Emmons	113	1983–84 1984–85 1985–86 1986–87
	Ralph Vos	113	1983–84 1984–85 1985–86 1986–87

Season
Rk	Player	Assists	Season
1	Bill Joyce	55	1979–80
	Steve Bozek	55	1980–81
	Jim Hiller	55	1991–92
4	Jeff Pyle	53	1980–81
5	Mark Beaufait	50	1991–92
6	Steve Bozek	47	1979–80
7	Scott Beattie	46	1991–92
8	Dallas Drake	44	1991–92
9	Mike Mielke	43	1979–80
	Brad Werenka	43	1990–91

Single Game
Rk	Player	Assists	Season	Opponent
1	Steve Fisher	7	1979–80	Illinois-Chicago

== Points ==
Career
Rk	Player	Points	Seasons
1	Bill Joyce	255	1976–77 1977–78 1978–79 1979–80
2	Gary Emmons	243	1983–84 1984–85 1985–86 1986–87
3	Mike Mielke	235	1976–77 1977–78 1978–79 1979–80
4	Scott Beattie	222	1989–90 1990–91 1991–92
5	Dallas Drake	220	1988–89 1989–90 1990–91 1991–92
6	Jim Hiller	205	1989–90 1990–91 1991–92
7	Steve Bozek	203	1978–79 1979–80 1980–81
8	Jeff Pyle	193	1978–79 1979–80 1980–81
9	Don Waddell	172	1976–77 1977–78 1978–79 1979–80
10	Dean Antos	170	1987–88 1988–89 1989–90 1990–91

Season
Rk	Player	Points	Season
1	Bill Joyce	96	1979–80
2	Steve Bozek	90	1980–81
3	Steve Bozek	89	1979–80
	Scott Beattie	89	1990–91
5	Jeff Pyle	88	1980–81
6	Jim Hiller	86	1991–92
7	Dallas Drake	83	1991–92
8	Mark Beaufait	81	1991–92
9	Gary Emmons	75	1985–86
10	Scott Beattie	74	1991–92

Single Game
Rk	Player	Points	Season	Opponent
1	Steve Fisher	7	1979–80	Illinois-Chicago
	Steve Bozek	7	1979–80	Lake Superior State
	Eric Ponath	7	1981–82	Illinois-Chicago
	Gary Emmons	7	1985–86	Minnesota
	Joe Frederick	7	1991–92	Denver

== Saves ==
Career
Rk	Player	Saves	Seasons
1	Atte Tolvanen	3564	2015–16 2016–17 2017–18 2018–19
2	Craig Kowalski	3434	2000–01 2001–02 2002–03 2003–04
3	Jeff Poeschl	3403	1980–81 1981–82 1982–83 1983–84
4	Bill Pye	3362	1987–88 1988–89 1989–90 1990–91
5	Brian Stewart	3213	2006–07 2007–08 2008–09 2009–10
6	Dieter Kochan	2797	1993–94 1994–95 1995–96 1996–97
7	Steve Weeks	2686	1976–77 1977–78 1978–79 1979–80
8	Mike Jeffrey	2391	1984–85 1985–86 1986–87 1987–88
9	Jared Coreau	2108	2010–11 2011–12 2012–13

Season
Rk	Player	Saves	Season
1	Bill Pye	1261	1988–89
2	Jared Coreau	1109	2012–13
3	Brian Stewart	1099	2009–10
4	Steve Weeks	1067	1979–80
5	Atte Tolvanen	1048	2016–17
6	Craig Kowalski	1045	2003–04
7	Jeff Poeschl	1030	1982–83
8	Jeff Poeschl	993	1983–84
9	Brian Stewart	968	2007–08
10	Craig Kowalski	965	2001–02

Single Game
Rk	Player	Saves	Season	Opponent
1	William Gramme	65	2025–26	Massachusetts
2	John Corrigan	57	1984–85	Boston College
