= 1990–91 Northern Michigan Wildcats men's ice hockey season =

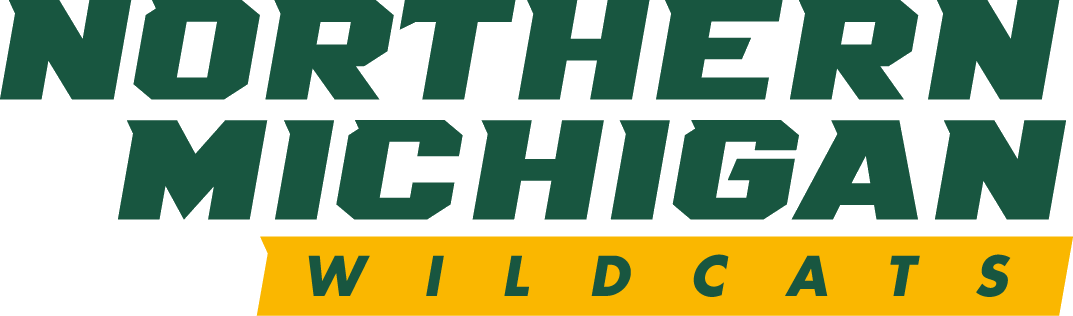

National champion WCHA, champion WCHA Tournament, champion NCAA Tournament, champion
- Conference: 1st WCHA
- Home ice: Lakeview Arena

Record
- Overall: 38–5–4
- Conference: 25–3–4
- Home: 23–0–2
- Road: 11–5–2
- Neutral: 4–0–0

Coaches and captains
- Head coach: Rick Comley
- Assistant coaches: Walt Kyle; Morey Gare
- Captain(s): Dean Antos; Darryl Plandowski; Dave Shyiak; Brad Werenka

The 1990–91 Northern Michigan Wildcats men's ice hockey team represented Northern Michigan University (NMU) in college ice hockey. In its 15th year under head coach Rick Comley, the team compiled a 38–5–4 record. The Wildcats won the 1991 national championship, their first national title.

== Season ==
Northern Michigan was looking to bounce back after a disappointing season. Defense man Brad Werenka recovered from his injury and rejoined the team for the fifth year. Scott Beattie and Jim Hiller, strong sophomores would also help the team.

=== Scoring early and often ===
From the start of the season, it was apparent that the Wildcats had one of the best offenses in the nation. Their scoring prowess, combined with playing seven consecutive games at home, allowed NMU to get off to an 8–0–1 start. Their winning streak ended when they hit the road to play Minnesota; without the advantage of the Lakeview Arena crowd NMU took only 1 point over the weekend and allowed the Gophers to take the top spot in the WCHA standings.

=== Road woes ===
Northern Michigan followed up their first loss of the season with a visit to the east, taking on Hockey East powerhouse Maine. The Black Bears shut down the high-flying Wildcat offense, holding NMU to three goals in two games. After the pair of losses, NMU returned home to face nearby rival Michigan Tech and were able to accomplish two wins in the home-and-home series. Two weeks later NMU headed to North Dakota to take on the Fighting Sioux in a very important series. Though the scores were close, NMU won both games, putting them ahead of Minnesota, who were also busy playing non-conference games. After the big win the Wildcats lost against St. Cloud State, a program that had just joined the WCHA, losing both road games to the Huskies. NMU had a one-point lead in the conference standings, but Minnesota had won two games, and it looked like the two teams would fight for the MacNaughton Cup.

=== Unbeaten streak ===
With 10 of their next 14 games at home, NMU saw an opportunity to make a run at their first WCHA title. After dominating Ohio State in a non-conference matchup, the Wildcats swept Colorado College before taking three points on road against Minnesota–Duluth. NMU got their revenge against St. Cloud with a pair of home wins, then headed to Colorado to face Denver where the porous defense gave Northern Michigan their biggest scoring weekend of the season with 20 goals in two games. NMU would end the season with a program-record 26-game unbeaten streak(and eventually extended that mark to 30 games)

=== WCHA showdown ===
By the end of January, Northern Michigan and Minnesota were tied in the conference standings with identical 20–3–3 records. While NMU hosted non-conference Bowling Green, Minnesota took on Minnesota–Duluth and could only manage a single point in two games. The two teams headed for a clash of the WCHA titans in Marquette with the Gophers up by a point while Northern Michigan had two games in hand, a reversal of situation back in December. The teams fought to a 3–3 tie in the first game but the Wildcats offense broke through in the second match, giving NMU a much-needed win and the lead in the WCHA standings.

While Minnesota licked its wounds with a week off, NMU faced MTU for their second home-and-home. The Huskies were no match for the Wildcats, and with the two wins, NMU won the MacNaughton Cup with two games to spare. The conference title all but guaranteed Northern Michigan a spot in the NCAA Tournament and they headed to Wisconsin where they won both games against the defending national champion the Badgers.

=== WCHA tournament ===
NMU took on Colorado College in the quarterfinals. While the Wildcats scored 13 goals in the two games, Bill Pye got his fourth shutout of the season, a new program record. After dropping North Dakota in the semifinal, NMU faced Minnesota for the championship. Prior to the game the NCAA had already announced the seeding for the NCAA tournament and Northern Michigan was given the second western slot. Despite being guaranteed a first round bye, the Wildcats weren't distracted by their good fortune and held the Gophers back, winning the close affair 4–2 with an empty net goal to seal the match. Bill Pye was named the Tournament MVP, and is the only player in history to win the award more than once (as of 2019).

=== NCAA tournament ===
With a week of to rest and prepare for the quarterfinals, Northern Michigan was gearing up to face Boston College but, surprisingly, the Eagles were upset in the first round by Alaska–Anchorage. When the Seawolves arrived at Marquette, Northern Michigan expected to run roughshod over the unheralded team. Early in the first game it appeared they were going to do just that but after building a 3-goal lead UAA scored the next two to give NMU a challenge. Anchorage did everything in their power to win the game but the Wildcat offense was just too powerful, and Northern Michigan took the first game 8–5. It was a similar case in the second game and when the dust settled NMU won the game 5–3 and advanced to the Frozen Four. The two wins against Alaska–Anchorage saw two more program records set; the first win was Northern Michigan's 35th of the season, breaking the mark set by the 1980 team, while the rematch saw Bill Pye winning his 30th game of the year, breaking Steve Weeks' previous record, also set in 1980.

In the national semifinals NMU played the Black Bears. The top eastern team had easily dispatched Minnesota in their quarterfinals and were looking for a repeat performance but this time the Wildcats were ready for the opposing team's defense. Northern Michigan beat Maine by scoring 4 of the last 5 goals and winning 5–3 and advanced to their second championship game.

==== National championship ====
With one game left, only Boston University stood in the way of NMU's first national championship. From the start the two teams seemed evenly matched but in the first the puck bounced in BU's favor and the Terriers scored three times to build a big lead. The Wildcats headed into the locker room worried about their deficit but as the nation's top offense, scoring was one thing they knew they could do. One of the four team captains, Dean Antos finally got NMU on the board in the second period and the team took off. In what head coach Rick Comley would later call their best period of the season, Northern Michigan scored five unanswered goals in middle frame to take a 5–3 lead after 40 minutes.

Comley's counterpart, Jack Parker, responded to the turn of events by replacing his goaltender at for the third. The initial result was poor as Scott Beattie scored his third goal of the game to open the period. BU finally responded with a goal from a falling Dave Thomlinson but Darryl Plandowski's second of the night gave NMU back their three-goal lead. With less than 12 minutes remaining, the Wildcats started to believe they were going to win the national championship but BU kept coming. In a short span Tony Amonte and Shawn McEachern scored, with each assisting on the other's goal, to cut the lead down to one. Northern Michigan tightened up defensively and kept the Terriers off the scoresheet until 39 seconds when Dave Sacco chipped the puck into the net with the goaltender pulled. With their lead evaporated, NMU nearly lost the game outright with seconds to play but Bill Pye snagged a shot from Amonte out of the air and keep the game tied.

In the overtime session Northern Michigan seemed to regain its focus and continued to fire the puck on goal but couldn't find the back of the net. Disaster nearly struck the Wildcats when Kevin O'Sullivan got free in the left circle and fired a shot that eluded Bill Pye's right pad and hit the post behind him. The puck deflected across the front of the net then bounced right to BU's leading scorer, Shawn McEachern, who had to hurry a shot at a nearly open net. Rather than hit the twine the puck struck the same post yet again, slid all the way across the goal line and bounced off Brad Werenka's skate back in front of the net where Pye was finally able to cover it before it entered the net. Not to be outdone, off of the ensuing faceoff, Northern Michigan's Tony Szabo hit the crossbar with a slapshot leaving both teams feeling fortunate for the close misses.

The chances kept coming in the second 10-minute overtime session but both goaltenders stood tall. In took a third overtime before a team would break the tie and just under two minutes in Mark Beaufait grabbed the puck after a drop pass from Plandowski and skated towards the left circle. Two BU players followed Beaufait as he headed for the goal line, allowing Plandowski to skate unchecked into the slot. Right when he got to the goal line, Beaufait extended his stick as far in front of him as he could and slipped the puck around a sliding defender right to Plandowski. BU's goaltender, Scott Cashman, had over played Beaufait and left the net essentially vacated so when Plandowski shot the puck there was no one there to stop it and NMU's eighth goal of the night ended one of craziest games in NCAA history.

Beattie and Plandowski became the first two players to score hat-tricks in the same NCAA championship game, a feat that has not been repeated since (as of 2019).

=== Awards and honors ===
Scott Beattie was named as the Tournament MOP and his hat-trick in the finale gave him the program record for goals in a season (48). Beattie was joined on the All-Tournament Team by teammates Bill Pye, Lou Melone and Brad Werenka. Beattie's 89 points led both his team and the nation in scoring, becoming NMU's first (and only as of 2019) NCAA Scoring champion. Rick Comley's team posted a program record 38 wins, tied for the 3rd-highest total ever (as of 2019) and received the Spencer Penrose Award as the national coach of the year.

Brad Werenka set a program record for goals, assists and points in a season by a defenseman (20, 43 and 63 respectively) and was named to the All-American West First Team along with Beattie. Bill Pye's program-record 32 wins led the nation and he was a Second Team All-American.

NMU's dominance throughout the season was recognized with a clean sweep of the individual WCHA awards: Scott Beattie was named Most Valuable Player, Tony Szabo received the Rookie of the Year, Werenka was awarded the Student-Athlete of the Year and Rick Comley got his second Coach of the Year Award. Beattie, Werenka and Pye were all named to the All-WCHA First Team. while Szabo made the inaugural conference Rookie team.

== Standings ==
1990–91 Western Collegiate Hockey Association standings
| | Conference | | | | | | | Overall | | | | | |
| | GP | W | L | T | PTS | GF | GA | GP | W | L | T | GF | GA |
|---|---|---|---|---|---|---|---|---|---|---|---|---|---|
| Northern Michigan†* | 32 | 25 | 3 | 4 | 54 | 185 | 89 | 47 | 38 | 5 | 4 | 283 | 133 |
| Minnesota | 32 | 22 | 5 | 5 | 49 | 151 | 97 | 45 | 30 | 10 | 5 | 215 | 142 |
| Wisconsin | 32 | 19 | 11 | 2 | 40 | 132 | 108 | 44 | 26 | 15 | 3 | 174 | 143 |
| North Dakota | 32 | 18 | 12 | 2 | 38 | 148 | 127 | 43 | 24 | 17 | 2 | 207 | 171 |
| St. Cloud State | 32 | 12 | 16 | 4 | 28 | 124 | 152 | 41 | 18 | 19 | 4 | 170 | 186 |
| Minnesota-Duluth | 32 | 11 | 15 | 6 | 28 | 114 | 133 | 40 | 14 | 19 | 7 | 142 | 164 |
| Michigan Tech | 32 | 9 | 21 | 2 | 20 | 105 | 134 | 41 | 13 | 25 | 3 | 139 | 164 |
| Colorado College | 32 | 9 | 22 | 1 | 19 | 106 | 139 | 40 | 13 | 26 | 1 | 129 | 169 |
| Denver | 32 | 5 | 25 | 2 | 12 | 95 | 182 | 38 | 6 | 30 | 2 | 109 | 224 |
Championship: Northern Michigan † indicates conference regular season champion * indicates conference tournament champion

== Schedule ==
| Date | Opponent | Site | Result | Record |
Regular season
| October 12 | at Colorado College | Broadmoor World Arena • Colorado Springs, Colorado | W 7–5 | 1–0 (1–0) |
| October 13 | at Colorado College | Broadmoor World Arena • Colorado Springs, Colorado | W 8–3 | 2–0 (2–0) |
| October 19 | vs. North Dakota | Lakeview Arena • Marquette, Michigan | W 6–0 | 3–0 (3–0) |
| October 20 | vs. North Dakota | Lakeview Arena • Marquette, Michigan | T 5–5 ^{OT} | 3–0–1 (3–0–1) |
| October 26 | vs. Laurentian | Lakeview Arena • Marquette, Michigan | W 10–1 | 4–0–1 (3–0–1) |
| November 2 | vs. Wisconsin | Lakeview Arena • Marquette, Michigan | W 6–1 | 5–0–1 (4–0–1) |
| November 3 | vs. Wisconsin | Lakeview Arena • Marquette, Michigan | W 4–2 | 6–0–1 (5–0–1) |
| November 9 | vs. Denver | Lakeview Arena • Marquette, Michigan | W 9–2 | 7–0–1 (6–0–1) |
| November 10 | vs. Denver | Lakeview Arena • Marquette, Michigan | W 6–3 | 8–0–1 (7–0–1) |
| November 16 | at Minnesota | Williams Arena • Minneapolis, Minnesota | L 3–5 | 8–1–1 (7–1–1) |
| November 17 | at Minnesota | Williams Arena • Minneapolis, Minnesota | T 4–4 ^{OT} | 8–1–2 (7–1–2) |
| November 23 | at Maine* | Alfond Arena • Orono, Maine | L 1–4 | 8–2–2 (7–1–2) |
| November 24 | at Maine* | Alfond Arena • Orono, Maine | L 2–4 | 8–3–2 (7–1–2) |
| November 30 | vs. Michigan Tech | Lakeview Arena • Marquette, Michigan | W 6–3 | 9–3–2 (8–1–2) |
| December 1 | at Michigan Tech | MacInnes Student Ice Arena • Houghton, Michigan | W 4–3 | 10–3–2 (9–1–2) |
| December 7 | vs. Minnesota–Duluth | Lakeview Arena • Marquette, Michigan | W 6–3 | 11–3–2 (10–1–2) |
| December 8 | vs. Minnesota–Duluth | Lakeview Arena • Marquette, Michigan | W 8–0 | 12–3–2 (11–1–2) |
| December 16 | at North Dakota | Winter Sports Center • Grand Forks, North Dakota | W 5–3 | 13–3–2 (12–1–2) |
| December 17 | at North Dakota | Winter Sports Center • Grand Forks, North Dakota | W 7–5 | 14–3–2 (13–1–2) |
| December 20 | at St. Cloud State | National Hockey Center • St. Cloud, Minnesota | L 3–4 | 14–4–2 (13–2–2) |
| December 21 | at St. Cloud State | National Hockey Center • St. Cloud, Minnesota | L 4–6 | 14–5–2 (13–3–2) |
| December 28 | vs. Ohio State* | Lakeview Arena • Marquette, Michigan | W 10–0 | 15–5–2 (13–3–2) |
| December 29 | vs. Ohio State* | Lakeview Arena • Marquette, Michigan | W 8–3 | 16–5–2 (13–3–2) |
| January 4 | vs. Colorado College | Lakeview Arena • Marquette, Michigan | W 6–2 | 17–5–2 (14–3–2) |
| January 5 | vs. Colorado College | Lakeview Arena • Marquette, Michigan | W 6–2 | 18–5–2 (15–3–2) |
| January 11 | at Minnesota–Duluth | Duluth Arena Auditorium • Duluth, Minnesota | T 2–2 ^{OT} | 18–5–3 (15–3–3) |
| January 12 | at Minnesota–Duluth | Duluth Arena Auditorium • Duluth, Minnesota | W 5–4 | 19–5–3 (16–3–3) |
| January 18 | vs. St. Cloud State | Lakeview Arena • Marquette, Michigan | W 8–3 | 20–5–3 (17–3–3) |
| January 19 | vs. St. Cloud State | Lakeview Arena • Marquette, Michigan | W 8–1 | 21–5–3 (18–3–3) |
| January 25 | at Denver | DU Arena • Denver, Colorado | W 12–2 | 22–5–3 (19–3–3) |
| January 26 | at Denver | DU Arena • Denver, Colorado | W 8–3 | 23–5–3 (20–3–3) |
| February 1 | vs. Bowling Green* | Lakeview Arena • Marquette, Michigan | W 9–3 | 24–5–3 (20–3–3) |
| February 2 | vs. Bowling Green* | Lakeview Arena • Marquette, Michigan | W 7–2 | 25–5–3 (20–3–3) |
| February 8 | vs. Minnesota | Lakeview Arena • Marquette, Michigan | T 3–3 ^{OT} | 25–5–4 (20–3–4) |
| February 9 | vs. Minnesota | Lakeview Arena • Marquette, Michigan | W 6–4 | 26–5–4 (21–3–4) |
| February 15 | at Michigan Tech | MacInnes Student Ice Arena • Houghton, Michigan | W 4–1 | 27–5–4 (22–3–4) |
| February 16 | vs. Michigan Tech | Lakeview Arena • Marquette, Michigan | W 6–2 | 28–5–4 (23–3–4) |
| February 22 | at Wisconsin | Dane County Coliseum • Madison, Wisconsin | W 6–1 | 29–5–4 (24–3–4) |
| February 23 | at Wisconsin | Dane County Coliseum • Madison, Wisconsin | W 4–3 ^{OT} | 30–5–4 (25–3–4) |
WCHA Tournament
| March 1 | vs. Colorado College* | Lakeview Arena • Marquette, Michigan (WCHA Quarterfinal game 1) | W 7–0 | 31–5–4 (25–3–4) |
| March 2 | vs. Colorado College* | Lakeview Arena • Marquette, Michigan (WCHA Quarterfinal game 2) | W 6–3 | 32–5–4 (25–3–4) |
Northern Michigan won series 2-0
| March 10 | at North Dakota* | Civic Center • Saint Paul, Minnesota (WCHA Semifinal) | W 8–4 | 33–5–4 (25–3–4) |
| March 11 | at Minnesota* | Civic Center • Saint Paul, Minnesota (WCHA championship) | W 4–2 | 34–5–4 (25–3–4) |
NCAA Tournament
| March 22 | vs. Alaska–Anchorage* | Lakeview Arena • Marquette, Michigan (National Quarterfinal game 1) | W 8–5 | 35–5–4 (25–3–4) |
| March 23 | vs. Alaska–Anchorage* | Lakeview Arena • Marquette, Michigan (National Quarterfinal game 2) | W 5–3 | 36–5–4 (25–3–4) |
Northern Michigan won series 2-0
| March 28 | vs. Maine* | Civic Center • Saint Paul, Minnesota (National Semifinal) | W 5–3 | 37–5–4 (25–3–4) |
| March 30 | vs. Boston University* | Civic Center • Saint Paul, Minnesota (National championship) | W 8–7 ^{3OT} | 38–5–4 (25–3–4) |
*Non-conference game. Source:

== Roster and scoring statistics ==
| No. | Name | Year | Position | Hometown | S/P/C | Games | Goals | Assists | Pts | PIM |
|---|---|---|---|---|---|---|---|---|---|---|
| 17 | Scott Beattie | Sophomore | C | Kimberley, BC | (British Columbia) | 46 | 48 | 41 | 89 | 66 |
| 18 | Jim Hiller | Sophomore | RW | Port Alberni, BC | (British Columbia) | 43 | 22 | 41 | 63 | 59 |
| 5 | Brad Werenka | Senior | D | Two Hills, AB | (Alberta) | 47 | 20 | 43 | 63 | 36 |
| 25 | Tony Szabo | Freshman | F | Flint, MI | (Michigan) | 47 | 39 | 20 | 59 | 60 |
| 10 | Dallas Drake | Junior | C | Trail, BC | (British Columbia) | 44 | 22 | 36 | 58 | 89 |
| 19 | Kevin Scott | Senior | LW | Vernon, BC | (British Columbia) | 47 | 27 | 30 | 57 | 42 |
| 20 | Mark Beaufait | Junior | C | Royal Oak, MI | (Michigan) | 47 | 19 | 30 | 49 | 18 |
| 14 | Dean Antos | Senior | C | Killam, AB | (Alberta) | 40 | 17 | 26 | 43 | 63 |
| 8 | Phil Soukoroff | Junior | D | Fernie, BC | (British Columbia) | 47 | 6 | 33 | 39 | 22 |
| 15 | Darryl Plandowski | Senior | W | Lloydminster, AB | (Alberta) | 44 | 16 | 16 | 32 | 60 |
| 22 | Ed Ward | Senior | RW | Edmonton, AB | (Alberta) | 46 | 13 | 18 | 31 | 109 |
| 44 | Lou Melone | Junior | D | Milford, MI | (Michigan) | 47 | 1 | 23 | 24 | 34 |
| 33 | Joe Frederick | Freshman | RW | Madison, WI | (Wisconsin) | 40 | 9 | 11 | 20 | 77 |
| 4 | Geoff Simpson | Sophomore | D | Port Alberni, BC | (British Columbia) | 44 | 2 | 15 | 17 | 27 |
| 24 | Dave Shyiak | Senior | RW | Brandon, MB | (Manitoba) | 36 | 6 | 9 | 15 | 80 |
| 27 | Bryan Ganz | Freshman | F | Iron Mountain, MI | (Michigan) | 25 | 4 | 8 | 12 | 14 |
| 23 | Scott Smith | Freshman | D | Sault Ste. Marie, MI | (Michigan) | 14 | 3 | 9 | 12 | 2 |
| 21 | Mark Olson | Junior | F | Schenectady, NY | (New York (state)) | 23 | 4 | 7 | 11 | 6 |
| 26 | Garett MacDonald | Freshman | D | Burnaby, BC | (British Columbia) | 41 | 2 | 8 | 10 | 56 |
| 7 | Steve Carpenter | Freshman | D | Prince George, BC | (British Columbia) | 32 | 0 | 7 | 7 | 24 |
| 16 | Steve Woog | Freshman | F | Saint Paul, MN | (Minnesota) | 16 | 2 | 2 | 4 | 4 |
| 6 | Phil Neururer | Junior | D | Brooklyn Park, MN | (Minnesota) | 11 | 1 | 2 | 3 | 6 |
| 3 | Dave Huettl | Sophomore | F | Fond du Lac, WI | (Wisconsin) | 8 | 0 | 2 | 2 | 12 |
| 2 | Dan Ruoho | Sophomore | LW | Madison, WI | (Wisconsin) | 6 | 0 | 1 | 1 | 9 |
| 1 | Bill Pye | Senior | G | Canton, MI | (Michigan) | 39 | 0 | 1 | 1 | 4 |
| 29 | Jamie Welsh | Freshman | G | Markham, ON | (Ontario) | 5 | 0 | 0 | 0 | 0 |
| 30 | Rob Kruhlak | Sophomore | G | Calgary, AB | (Alberta) | 11 | 0 | 0 | 0 | 0 |
| Total | | | | | | | | | | |

== Goaltending statistics ==
| No. | Name | Games | Minutes | Wins | Losses | Ties | Goals against | Saves | Shut outs | SV % | GAA |
|---|---|---|---|---|---|---|---|---|---|---|---|
| 29 | Jamie Welsh | 5 | 248 | 1 | 0 | 0 | 5 | 40 | 0 | .889 | 2.29 |
| 30 | Rob Kruhlak | 11 | 428 | 5 | 2 | 0 | 18 | 142 | 0 | .887 | 2.52 |
| 1 | Bill Pye | 39 | 2300 | 32 | 3 | 4 | 109 | 849 | 4 | .886 | 2.84 |
| Total | | 47 | | 38 | 5 | 4 | 133 | | 4 | | |

== 1991 national championship ==
=== (W2) Northern Michigan vs. (E2) Boston University ===
| March 30 | Northern Michigan | 8 – 7 | 3OT | Boston University | Saint Paul Civic Center | [https:// Recap] |

Scoring summary
| Period | Team | Goal | Assist(s) | Time | Score |
|---|---|---|---|---|---|
| 1st | BU | Ed Ronan | | | 1–0 BU |
| 1st | BU | David Sacco | | | 2–0 BU |
| 1st | BU | Ed Ronan | | | 3–0 BU |
| 2nd | NMU | Dean Antos | Werenka and Beattie | | 3–1 BU |
| 2nd | NMU | Mark Beaufait | Melone and Soukoroff | | 3–2 BU |
| 2nd | NMU | Scott Beattie | Melone and Scott | | 3–3 |
| 2nd | NMU | Darryl Plandowski | Frederick | | 4–3 NMU |
| 2nd | NMU | Scott Beattie | unassisted | | 5–3 NMU |
| 3rd | NMU | Scott Beattie | unassisted | 43:08 | 6–3 NMU |
| 3rd | BU | Dave Tomlinson | | 45:59 | 6–4 NMU |
| 3rd | NMU | Darryl Plandowski | Soukoroff | 48:24 | 7–4 NMU |
| 3rd | BU | Tony Amonte | McEachern | 52:24 | 7–5 NMU |
| 3rd | BU | Shawn McEachern | Amonte | 54:51 | 7–6 NMU |
| 3rd | BU | David Sacco | Tomlinson | 59:21 | 7–7 |
| 3rd Overtime | NMU | Darryl Plandowski | Beaufait and Antos | 81:57 | 8–7 NMU |

Goaltenders
| Team | Name | Saves | Goals against | Time on ice |
|---|---|---|---|---|
| NMU | Bill Pye | | 7 | |
| BU | John Bradley | | 5 | |
| BU | Scott Cashman | | 3 | |

== Players drafted into the NHL ==
=== 1991 NHL entry draft ===
| = NHL All-Star team | = NHL All-Star | = NHL All-Star and NHL All-Star team | = Did not play in the NHL |

| Round | Pick | Player | NHL team |
|---|---|---|---|
| 6 | 119 | Mike Harding† | Hartford Whalers |
| 9 | 177 | Corwin Saurdiff† | San Jose Sharks |
| 12 | 253 | Jason Hehr† | New Jersey Devils |

† incoming freshman

=== 1991 NHL supplemental draft ===
| Pick | Player | NHL team |
|---|---|---|
| 7 | Mark Beaufait | San Jose Sharks |
| 17 | Rob Kruhlak | New Jersey Devils |

== See also ==
- 1991 NCAA Division I Men's Ice Hockey Tournament
- List of NCAA Division I Men's Ice Hockey Tournament champions
