= Rick Comley =

Canadian ice hockey coach (born 1947)

Biographical details
- Born: January 20, 1947 (age 79); Burlington, Ontario, Canada

Playing career
- 1967–1971: Lake Superior State
- Position: Center

Coaching career (HC unless noted)
- 1973–1976: Lake Superior State
- 1976–2002: Northern Michigan
- 2002–2011: Michigan State

Administrative career (AD unless noted)
- 1987–2000: Northern Michigan
- 2022–present: Northern Michigan

Head coaching record
- Overall: 783–615–110 (.556)

Rick Comley (born January 20, 1947) is a Canadian former collegiate ice hockey player and former head coach at Michigan State University. He finished his 38-year coaching career with a 783–615–110 (.556) record. In 2007, he became the third coach in NCAA history to win a national championship at two different schools. Comley is currently serving in his second stint as the athletic director at Northern Michigan University, hired in 2022.

== Playing career ==
Comley played at Lake Superior State University in Sault Ste. Marie, Michigan (1967–1971) under head coach Ron Mason, at one time, college hockey's career coaching victories leader. In his senior season, Comley was named LSSU team captain and Most Valuable Player and was selected NAIA All-American. He was also named LSSU's Most Outstanding Athlete that year.

== Coaching career ==
=== Lake Superior State ===
Comley rejoined the LSSU program as an assistant coach for the 1972-73 season. When head coach Ron Mason took the head coaching position at Bowling Green State University, Comley was named his successor. Comley compiled a 59-46-3 mark in the three seasons at Lake Superior winning the CCHA regular-season title and NAIA national championship in 1974.

=== Northern Michigan ===
In 1976, Northern Michigan University launched a varsity hockey program, and approached Comley to become its first head coach. NMU's offer included a recruiting budget twice the size of LSSU, which was too much for Comley to resist. NMU finished its first season with a winning record of 19-13-1. In the program's fourth season, Comley guided NMU to their first of two consecutive CCHA regular-season and play-off championships. With those championships in 1980 and 1981, Northern Michigan earned automatic bids to the NCAA Tournament. The 34-6-1 1980 team defeated University of Minnesota in Minneapolis advancing to the NCAA Frozen Four where they defeated No. 1 seed Cornell University to make the national championship game. The team lost the national championship to North Dakota, 5-2. Again, Comley guided NMU to the NCAA Frozen Four in 1981 with a victory over Cornell before losing to eventual national champion Wisconsin and archrival Michigan Tech in the consolation game.

In 1984 Comley and Northern Michigan followed Michigan Tech to the Western Collegiate Hockey Association. In the WCHA, Comley coached NMU to seven 20-win seasons in nine years. He won the WCHA MacNaughton Cup as regular-season champions in 1991 and won the Broadmoor Trophy as play-off champions in 1989, 1991 and 1992. During Northern Michigan's time in the WCHA, the Wildcats made the NCAA tournament in 1989, 1991, 1992 and 1993 winning the 1991 NCAA national championship in a dramatic triple overtime game against Boston University.

In a university-wide effort to gain more presence in the lower peninsula of Michigan, Comley switched NMU's hockey program back to the CCHA in 1997. The move proved to re-energize hockey at Northern Michigan which had three straight losing seasons prior to 1997-98. Comley coached NMU to five straight winning seasons and three trips to Joe Louis Arena for the CCHA championships. In 1999, Northern Michigan made the CCHA title game, but lost to University of Michigan. The championship appearance earned Comley and NMU their first berth in the NCAA tournament since 1993.

During his time at NMU, Comley also served as athletic director from 1987-2000 highlighted by: major improvements in facilities including the building and completion of Superior Dome and Berry Events Center, several Great Lakes Intercollegiate Athletic Conference championships, two NCAA Division II titles in women's volleyball, and the establishment of the U.S. Olympic Educational Center.

=== Michigan State ===
Rick Comley was announced as Ron Mason's successor as head ice hockey coach at Michigan State University in March 2002. Comley was succeeded at NMU by former player and New York Rangers assistant Walt Kyle. Previously, Comley declined head coaching offers at Bowling Green State University in 1979 and 1994 and at University of Denver in 1994.

Comley's tenure at MSU was turbulent replacing the iconic Ron Mason. After missing the NCAA tournament in 2005, Comley guided MSU to a second-place CCHA finish and a CCHA play-off championship in 2005-06. In 2006-07, Michigan State was preseason ranked No. 5, which was MSU's highest preseason ranking since October 2001. The team was, again, inconsistent but earned an NCAA Tournament bid. In a stunning series of games, MSU defeated three higher-ranked teams en route to the national championship, including wins against No. 1-ranked Notre Dame in the Midwest Regional final and No. 4-ranked Boston College in the National Championship game.

Comley retired at the end of the 2010-2011 season. He was succeeded by Tom Anastos.

== Administrative career ==
After previously serving in the role while still the hockey head coach from 1987-2000, Comley was rehired as the athletic director at Northern Michigan University in 2022 after the previous director, Forrest Karr, left to accept the same position at the University of Minnesota Duluth.

== Legacy ==
Rick Comley is one of only five coaches to have won more than 700 games, and one of only three to have won NCAA Championships at two separate schools. Comley was the CCHA coach of the year twice (1980 and 1981) and WCHA coach of the year twice (1989 and 1991). He has won the Spencer Penrose Memorial Trophy as the national coach of the year twice (1980 and 1991). He was runner-up for the Spencer Penrose Trophy in 2007.

In his 33 seasons as a head coach, Rick Comley coached 1991 Hobey Baker Memorial Award runner-up Brad Werenka and nine Hobey Baker finalists. He has coached 14 AHCA First and Second Team All-Americans, three CCHA players of the year, one WCHA player of the year, 20 First and Second Team All-CCHA selections, 13 First Team and Second Team All-WCHA selection and 19 players who went on to play in the NHL.

In addition Comley has 25 seasons with a winning record, 17 seasons winning 20 or more games and two seasons winning 30 or more games. Comley has won two CCHA regular-season championships, three CCHA play-off titles, one WCHA regular-season title and four WCHA play-off titles. His teams have advanced to the NCAA tournament nine times making the Frozen Four four times.

== Notable players coached ==
In 38 years of coaching, Rick Comley has coached a number of award-winning players.

=== Hobey Baker Award finalists ===
Steve Bozek	1981
Gary Emmons	1986 and 1987
Phil Berger	1988
Scott Beattie	1991 and 1992
Brad Werenka	1991
John-Michael Liles	2003
Jim Slater	2004
Jeff Lerg	2008

=== AHCA All-America ===
Steve Bozek	1981	Forward	Northern Michigan	
Bill Schafhauser	1984	Defense	Northern Michigan	Second Team
Gary Emmons	1987	Forward	Northern Michigan	Second Team
Phil Berger	1988	Forward	Northern Michigan	Second Team
Darryl Olsen	1989	Defense	Northern Michigan	Second Team
Brad Werenka	1991	Defense	Northern Michigan	
Scott Beattie	1991	Forward	Northern Michigan	
Bill Pye	1991	Goalie	Northern Michigan	Second Team
Dallas Drake	1992	Forward	Northern Michigan	
Jim Hiller	1992	Forward	Northern Michigan	Second Team
John-Michael Liles	2003	Defense	Michigan State	
Brad Fast	2003	Defense	Michigan State	Second Team
Jim Slater	2004	Forward	Michigan State	Second Team
A.J. Thelen	2004	Defense	Michigan State	Second Team
Jeff Lerg	2008	Goalie	Michigan State	Second Team
Jeff Petry	2008	Defense	Michigan State	Second Team

=== Conference Player of the Year ===
Don Waddell	1978	Defense	Northern Michigan
Steve Weeks	1980	Goalie	Northern Michigan
Jeff Pyle	1981	Forward	Northern Michigan
Scott Beattie	1991	Forward	Northern Michigan

=== NHL players ===
Justin Abdelkader	Michigan State	Detroit Red Wings
David Booth	Michigan State	Detroit Red Wings
Steve Bozek	Northern Michigan	Calgary Flames
Dallas Drake	Northern Michigan	Detroit Red Wings
Brad Fast	Michigan State	Carolina Hurricanes
Keith Hanson	Northern Michigan	Calgary Flames
Jim Hiller	Northern Michigan	Los Angeles Kings
Tim Kennedy	Michigan State	Florida Panthers
Dieter Kochan	Northern Michigan	Tampa Bay Lightning
Torey Krug	Michigan State	Boston Bruins
Tom Laidlaw	Northern Michigan	New York Rangers
Drew Miller	Michigan State	Detroit Red Wings
Chris Mueller	Michigan State	Tampa Bay Lightning
Jeff Petry	Michigan State	Edmonton Oilers
Corey Potter	Michigan State	Edmonton Oilers
Jim Slater	Michigan State	Winnipeg Jets
Mike Stutzel	Northern Michigan	Phoenix Coyotes
Corey Tropp	Michigan State	Buffalo Sabres
Don Waddell	Northern Michigan	Los Angeles Kings
Ed Ward	Northern Michigan	Calgary Flames
Steve Weeks	Northern Michigan	Vancouver Canucks
Brad Werenka	Northern Michigan	Pittsburgh Penguins
J.P. Vigier	Northern Michigan	Atlanta Thrashers

=== Olympians ===
Mark Beaufait	1994	USA	
Bruno Campese	1994	Italy	
Phil DeGaetano	1994	Italy	
Eric LeMarque	1994	France	
Brad Werenka	1994	Canada	Silver

== Head coaching record ==
Record table
Season	Team	Overall	Conference	Standing	Postseason
Lake Superior State Lakers (CCHA) (1973–1976)
1973-74	Lake Superior State	22-16-1	5-3-0	t-1st	NAIA Champions† / CCHA runner-up
1974-75	Lake Superior State	17-14-1	2-5-1	3rd	CCHA runner-up
1975-76	Lake Superior State	20-16-1	9-7-0	3rd	CCHA Semifinals
Lake Superior State:		59-46-3	16-15-1		
Northern Michigan Wildcats Independent (1976–1977)
1976-77	Northern Michigan	19-13-1			
Northern Michigan Wildcats (CCHA) (1977–1984)
1977-78	Northern Michigan	19-12-3	8-10-2	t-3rd	CCHA Semifinals
1978-79	Northern Michigan	19-12-3	13-10-1	3rd	CCHA Semifinals
1979-80	Northern Michigan	34-6-1	17-3-0	1st	NCAA runner-up
1980-81	Northern Michigan	27-14-3	18-4-0	1st	NCAA Third-place game (loss)
1981-82	Northern Michigan	15-21-0	12-16-0	8th	CCHA Quarterfinals
1982-83	Northern Michigan	18-18-4	16-13-3	5th	CCHA consolation game (loss)
1983-84	Northern Michigan	17-22-1	16-14-0	4th	CCHA Quarterfinals
Northern Michigan Wildcats (WCHA) (1984–1997)
1984-85	Northern Michigan	19-21-0	14-20-0	7th	WCHA Quarterfinals
1985-86	Northern Michigan	23-14-2	21-13-0	5th	WCHA Quarterfinals
1986-87	Northern Michigan	18-21-1	16-18-1	5th	WCHA Quarterfinals
1987-88	Northern Michigan	16-20-4	14-17-4	t-6th	WCHA Quarterfinals
1988-89	Northern Michigan	26-17-2	20-13-2	2nd	NCAA First round
1989-90	Northern Michigan	22-19-1	15-12-1	4th	WCHA Third Place game (loss)
1990-91	Northern Michigan	38-5-4	25-3-4	1st	NCAA national champion
1991-92	Northern Michigan	25-14-3	17-12-3	3rd	NCAA regional semifinals
1992-93	Northern Michigan	21-18-4	15-13-4	5th	NCAA regional semifinals
1993-94	Northern Michigan	22-16-1	17-14-1	5th	WCHA Quarterfinal
1994-95	Northern Michigan	13-24-3	10-19-3	9th	WCHA First round
1995-96	Northern Michigan	7-30-2	5-25-2	10th	WCHA First round
1996-97	Northern Michigan	13-24-3	9-21-2	8th	WCHA First round
Northern Michigan Wildcats (CCHA) (1997–2002)
1997-98	Northern Michigan	19-15-4	15-12-3	4th	CCHA Semifinals
1998-99	Northern Michigan	22-15-5	14-11-5	5th	NCAA West Regional Quarterfinals
1999-00	Northern Michigan	22-13-4	16-8-4	t-3rd	CCHA First round
2000–01	Northern Michigan	18-13-7	12-10-6	t-5th	CCHA Play-In
2001–02	Northern Michigan	26-12-2	16-10-2	3rd	CCHA Semifinals
Northern Michigan:		538-429-68			
Michigan State Spartans (CCHA) (2002–2011)
2002–03	Michigan State	23-14-2	17-10-1	4th	CCHA Quarterfinals
2003–04	Michigan State	23-17-2	17-9-2	3rd	NCAA Midwest Regional semifinals
2004–05	Michigan State	20-17-4	12-13-3	6th	CCHA Third Place game (loss)
2005–06	Michigan State	25-12-8	14-7-7	2nd	NCAA East Regional Final
2006–07	Michigan State	26-13-3	15-10-3	4th	NCAA national champion
2007–08	Michigan State	25-12-5	19-6-3	3rd	NCAA West Regional Final
2008–09	Michigan State	10-23-5	7-17-4	t-10th	CCHA First round
2009–10	Michigan State	19-13-6	14-8-6	2nd	CCHA Quarterfinals
2010–11	Michigan State	15-19-4	11-15-2	10th	CCHA First round
Michigan State:		186-140-39			
Total:		783-615-110			
National champion Postseason invitational champion Conference regular season champion Conference regular season and conference tournament champion Division regular season champion Division regular season and conference tournament champion Conference tournament champion

† Lake Superior State was a member of both the CCHA and NAIA for the 1973-74 season.

== See also ==
- List of college men's ice hockey coaches with 400 wins

Awards and achievements
Preceded by Charlie Holt; Terry Slater	Spencer Penrose Award; 1979–80; 1990–91	Succeeded by Bill O'Flaherty; Ron Mason
Preceded by Ron Mason	CCHA Coach of the Year; 1979–80, 1980–81	Succeeded by Jerry York
Preceded by Herb Boxer; Doug Woog	WCHA Coach of the Year; 1988–89; 1990–91	Succeeded by Doug Woog; Brad Buetow
Preceded by Jim Cross	Hobey Baker Legends of College Hockey Award; 2020	Succeeded by Mike Sertich
