= Northern Michigan Wildcats men's ice hockey =

- Current season
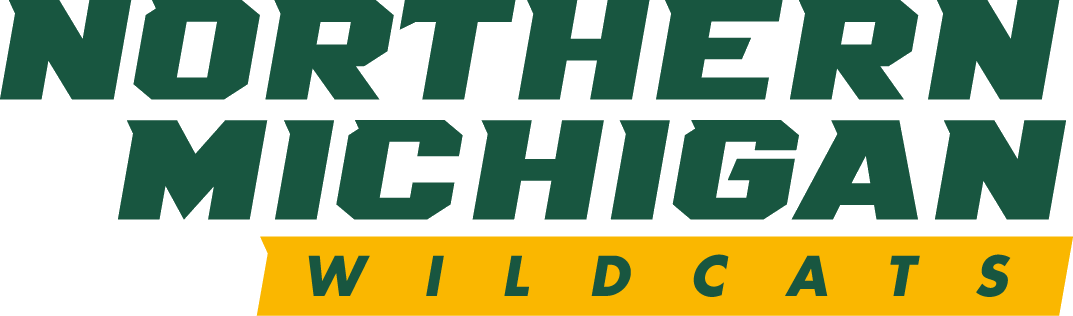
- University: Northern Michigan University
- Conference: CCHA
- Head coach: Dave Shyiak; 3rd season, 8–56–4 (.147)
- Assistant coaches: Chris Kamal; Phil Fox; Ben Russell
- Arena: Berry Events Center; Marquette, Michigan
- Colors: Green and gold

NCAA tournament champions
- 1991

NCAA tournament runner-up
- 1980

NCAA tournament Frozen Four
- 1980, 1981, 1991

NCAA tournament appearances
- 1980, 1981, 1989, 1991, 1992, 1993, 1999, 2010

Conference tournament champions
- CCHA: 1980, 1981; WCHA: 1989, 1991, 1992

Conference regular season champions
- CCHA: 1980, 1981; WCHA: 1991

Current uniform

The Northern Michigan Wildcats men's ice hockey team is a National Collegiate Athletic Association (NCAA) Division I college ice hockey program that represents Northern Michigan University (NMU). The Wildcats are a member of the Central Collegiate Hockey Association (CCHA). NMU has won one national title and has made three Frozen Four appearances. They play at the Berry Events Center in Marquette, Michigan.

== History ==
=== Early history ===
Under the Direction of NMU's president, John X. Jamrich, the initial ice hockey program was originally initiated by Seniors Gregory Hyde and Christopher Nolan in 1974. The NMU men's ice hockey program began in 1976, competing as an independent NCAA Division I team and probationary member of Central Collegiate Hockey Association (CCHA) for the 1976–77 season. During that season NMU competed against CCHA teams but did not count for league standings. Northern Michigan became a full member of the CCHA the following season.

In the first two season as a full member of the CCHA Northern Michigan finished with back-to-back 19 win seasons before a historic season in program history in 1979–80. During the 1979–80 season the team won its first CCHA regular season championship and CCHA Playoff tournament championship. The Wildcats advanced to their first ever NCAA tournament appearance and won their first game 4–3 against Minnesota. NMU advanced to the National Championship game with a semifinal win over Cornell 5–4. Northern Michigan finished as the runner-up to North Dakota. In addition to the tournament being the first tournament and National Championship appearance for Northern Michigan, it was also the highest NCAA tournament finish for a CCHA team. NMU head coach Rick Comley became the first CCHA coach to receive the Spencer Penrose Award given to the NCAA Division I Men's Hockey Coach of the Year.

The success of the 1979–80 season continued for the 1980–81 season. The Wildcats again won the CCHA regular season and playoff championships and advanced to the NCAA tournament. The Wildcats won the quarterfinal game against Cornell 10–7 but fell in the semifinal to Wisconsin 5–1.

=== WCHA years ===
On January 5, 1984, Northern Michigan announced the program was leaving the CCHA after seven seasons two league and playoff championships and two NCAA tournament berths for the Western Collegiate Hockey Association (WCHA). The following day it was announced that rival Michigan Tech was also leaving the CCHA for WCHA. The 1988–89 season marked the first time NMU qualified for the NCAA tournament as a member of the WCHA. Unlike previous NCAA appearances Northern Michigan fell in the first round to Providence 5–4.

Northern Michigan qualified for the 1991 NCAA tournament after winning the WCHA regular season championship. Northern Michigan won two games to none in the quarterfinal round against Alaska-Anchorage, 8–5 and 5–3. NMU advanced and beat Maine 5–3 in the semifinal round. The Wildcats matched up in the National Championship game in St. Paul, Minnesota on April 1, 1991, against Boston University and won 8–7 in three overtime periods. The 1990–91 season also set a program best record of 38–5–4 and a winning percentage of .851. It also marked the program's first and only NCAA Championship. The Wildcats returned to the National Tournament in 1992 NCAA Division I men's ice hockey tournament as the 4th seed of the West Regional held in Detroit, Michigan. NMU picked up a first round win over Clarkson 8–4 before losing in the quarterfinal round 7–6 to Michigan. The 1992–93 season marked the third straight NCAA tournament appearance. NMU won a close game in the opening round of the 1993 tournament in the East Regional in Worcester, Massachusetts, against Harvard. The Wildcats won a close game 3–2 in two overtime periods but fell 4–1 in the second round to Boston University in a rematch of the 1991 National Championship.

During the following seasons NMU remained competitive in the WCHA but by the mid-1990s the program fell into the bottom half of the standings. After six 20-plus win seasons from 1988 to 1989 season through the 1993–94 season, the Wildcats failed to reach 15 wins in their last three seasons in the WCHA. The 1995–96 season marked a program low record of 7–30–2. On August 19, 1996, the CCHA approved Northern Michigan's application to rejoin the league for the 1997–98 season after 13 years in the WCHA. During the years in the WCHA the Wildcats accumulated a record of 263–243–30.

=== Recent history ===
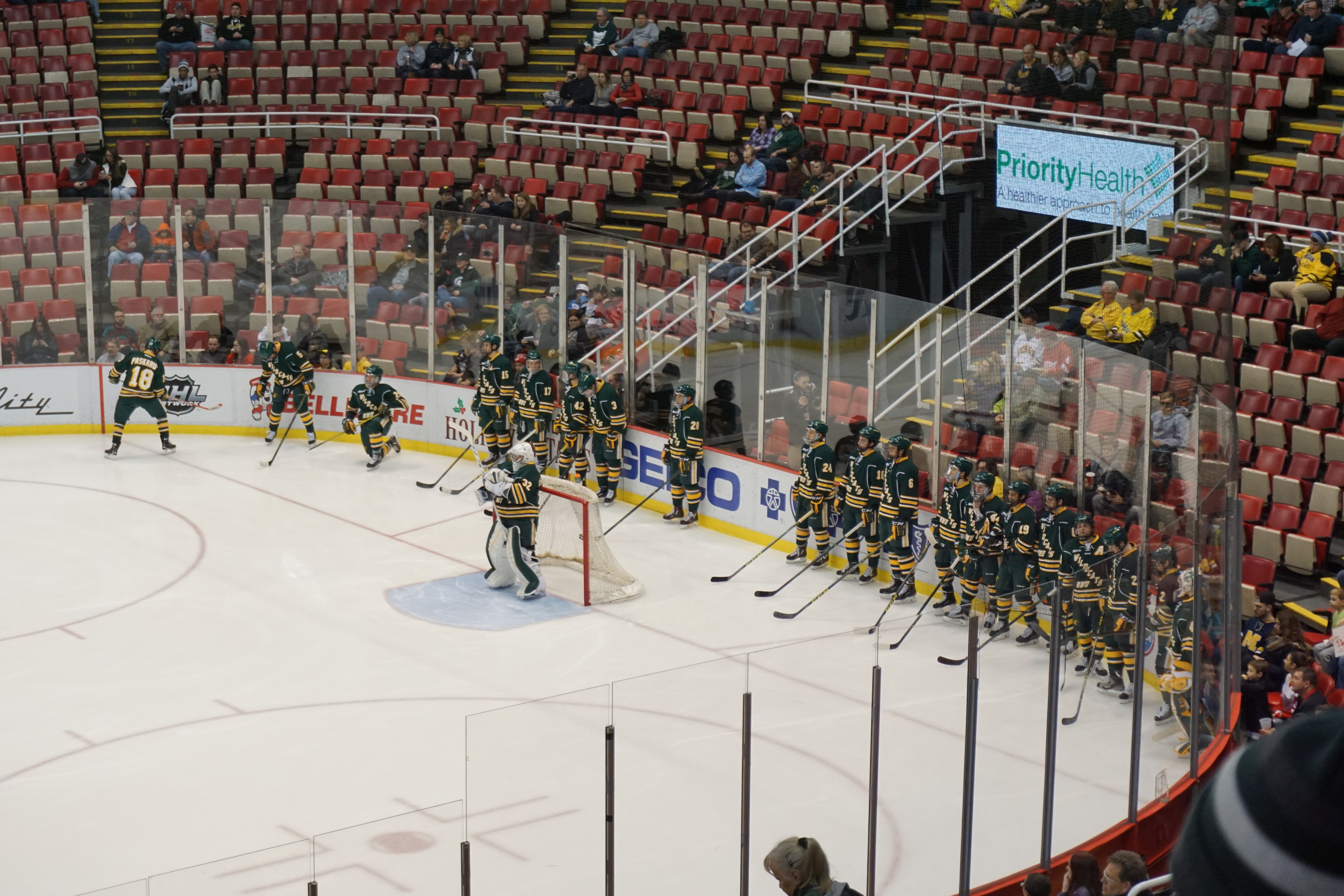
The Northern Michigan Wildcats at the 2015 Great Lakes Invitational

The return to the CCHA reinvigorated the program after several underachieving seasons and rebuilding years. In the 1996–97 season, the first back in the CCHA, the Wildcats finished with a record of 19–15–4. The season was the first winning record since the 1993–94 season. And in the following season NMU reached the NCAA National tournament for the seventh time in program history. Northern Michigan entered the tournament as the 5th seed in the West Regional. Northern Michigan's playoff run was ended early by Boston College in a low scoring game 1–2.

On June 13, 2002, it was announced that Walt Kyle would take over as head coach for the Wildcats to become the second coach in program history. Rick Comley left to take over the head coaching position at Michigan State after 26 seasons behind the bench of the Wildcats. Kyle won his first game as head coach of Northern Michigan on October 5, 2002, against Upper Michigan rival Michigan Tech, 4–1. Kyle's first CCHA victory came on October 18, 2002, 10–4 against Rick Comley and his Michigan State team. Kyle led the Wildcats to four straight 20+ win seasons from 2002 to 2006 and six of his first eight seasons behind the NMU bench.

One of the most successful seasons in recent history came in the 2009–10 season. Northern Michigan finished the regular season ranked fourth in the CCHA and ranked 16th in the nation. The Wildcats received a first round bye in the CCHA tournament and matched up against Alaska Fairbanks, coming off first round sweep of Western Michigan. Northern Michigan swept the Nanooks two games to none with 4–3 and 5–1 victories, advancing NMU to the semifinal round. Northern Michigan took on Ferris State looking to overcome the semifinal losses the previous two seasons. The Wildcats came out on top of their seventh appearance in the CCHA Semifinals in the last eight seasons with an overtime goal by Greger Hanson to give Northern Michigan the 5–4 OT win. The win was the first time Northern Michigan advanced to the CCHA Championship game since 1999, under Rick Comley. The Wildcats run in the CCHA playoffs ended in the Championship game, when Northern Michigan fell short in a close game to Michigan. The Wildcats' 2–1 loss to the Wolverines did not end their season as NMU received an at-large bid to the 2010 NCAA tournament, their first tournament appearance since 1999 and first under Walt Kyle. Northern Michigan's first NCAA tournament berth in 11 seasons took them to the West Regional at the Xcel Energy Center in St. Paul, Minnesota, and first round match-up against St. Cloud State. The Wildcats battled hard in front of a pro-SCSU crowd. Northern Michigan found themselves down early 2–0 in the first period but picked up a late goal by sophomore forward Justin Florek. St. Cloud answered in the second period on the power play but Northern Michigan kept within one goal when senior forward Ray Kaunisto scored late in the period. St. Cloud was held scoreless in the third while Northern Michigan tied the game with an even strength goal under four minutes left in the third period by junior defenseman Erik Spady. The Two team battled hard through the first overtime before St. Cloud State's Tony Mosey scored 23 seconds into the second overtime. Senior goaltender Brian Stewart stopped 50 SCSU shots in the tough loss.

In the summer of 2011, the Big Ten Conference announced intentions to begin sponsoring men's ice hockey in 2013, followed by Miami (OH) announcing the formation of the National Collegiate Hockey Conference for 2013 with and five other schools breaking from the WCHA. The realignment continued on July 20, 2011, when Northern Michigan was approved for membership in the WCHA beginning with the 2013–14 season.

In June 2019, it was announced that Northern Michigan was one of seven WCHA men's members that would leave to form a new conference after the 2020–21 season. Those schools later announced that they would reestablish the CCHA effective in 2021–22.

== Season-by-season results ==
Source:

== Historic record ==
=== Records vs. current CCHA teams ===
As of the completion of the 2020–21 season

School	Team	Away Arena	Overall record	Win %	Home	Away	Last Result
Bemidji State University	Beavers	Sanford Center	9–18–6	.364	2–10–2	7–8–4	5–3 L
Bowling Green State University	Falcons	Slater Family Ice Arena	57–57–10	.483	31–26–7	26–30–3	4–2 W
Ferris State University	Bulldogs	Ewigleben Arena	71–31–6	.685	41–17–2	28–13–4	4–2 L
Lake Superior State University	Lakers	Taffy Abel Arena	78–52–13	.591	49–19–5	29–33–8	5–4 W
Michigan Technological University	Huskies	MacInnes Student Ice Arena	77–76–14	.503	42–33–6	34–39–8	8–1 L
Minnesota State University	Mavericks	Mankato Civic Center	6–21–3	.250	4–9–3	3–13–0	8–1 L
University of St. Thomas	Tommies	St. Thomas Ice Arena	2–0–0	1.000	2–0–0	0–0–0	8–3 W

== Coaches ==
The Wildcats are currently coached by former team captain Dave Shyiak, who assumed coaching duties after Grant Potulny stepped down to become the head coach of the Hartford Wolf Pack in 2024.

=== All-time coaching records ===
As of the completion of 2025–26 season

Tenure	Coach	Years	Record	Pct.
1976–2002	Rick Comley	26	538–429–68	.553
2002–2017	Walt Kyle	15	265–263–68	.502
2017–2024	Grant Potulny	7	128–113–17	.529
2024–Present	Dave Shyiak	2	8–56–4	.147
Totals	4 coaches	50	939–861–157	.520

== Statistical leaders ==
The team statistical leaders are given below.

=== Career points leaders ===
Player	Years	GP	G	A	Pts	PIM
Bill Joyce	1976–1980	130	112	143	255	234
Gary Emmons	1983–1987	151	130	113	243	157
Mike Mielke	1976–1980	138	86	149	235	187
Scott Beattie	1989–1992	122	106	116	222	170
Dallas Drake	1988–1992	165	92	128	220	215
Jim Hiller	1989–1992	123	76	129	205	230
Steve Bozek	1978–1981	115	76	117	193	99
Jeff Pyle	1978–1981	115	76	117	193	36
Don Waddell	1976–1980	120	52	120	172	138
Dean Antos	1987–1991	162	75	95	170	173

=== Career goaltending leaders ===
GP = Games played; Min = Minutes played; W = Wins; L = Losses; T = Ties; GA = Goals against; SO = Shutouts; SV% = Save percentage; GAA = Goals against average

minimum 1000 minutes played

Player	Years	GP	Min	W	L	T	GA	SO	SV%	GAA
Tuomas Tarkki	2001–2005	56	2790	28	12	5	104	3	.924	2.24
Dan Ragusett	1997–2001	88	5002	43	25	11	195	8	.911	2.34
Atte Tolvanen	2015–2019	137	7930	62	58	13	319	13	.918	2.41
Mathias Dahlstrom	2013–2016	70	3992	30	30	7	164	8	.915	2.46
Brian Stewart	2006–2010	117	6515	50	42	14	275	10	.921	2.53

Statistics current through the end of the 2023–24 season.

== Players ==
=== Current roster ===
As of August 4, 2025.

No.	Nat.	Player	Class	Pos	Height	Weight	DoB	Hometown	Previous team	NHL rights
1	(Sweden)	William Gramme	Junior	G	6' 4" (1.93 m)	201 lb (91 kg)	2002-05-24	Stockholm, Sweden	Wisconsin (Big Ten)	—
2	(United States)	Joe Schiller	Sophomore	D	6' 0" (1.83 m)	190 lb (86 kg)	2004-09-23	Moorhead, Minnesota	Cedar Rapids RoughRiders (USHL)	—
3	(Canada)	Nick Ardanaz	Senior	D	5' 10" (1.78 m)	185 lb (84 kg)	2002-05-30	Surrey, British Columbia	Rensselaer (ECAC)	—
4	(Canada)	Warren Clark	Junior	D	6' 3" (1.91 m)	195 lb (88 kg)	2004-08-31	Riverside, Ontario	St. Cloud State (NCHC)	TBL, 179th overall 2023
5	(United States)	Grayden Daul	Sophomore	D	6' 0" (1.83 m)	181 lb (82 kg)	2003-01-31	Chicago, Illinois	Langley Rivermen (BCHL)	—
6	(Canada)	Tynan Ewart	Junior	D	6' 0" (1.83 m)	188 lb (85 kg)	2002-02-26	Duncan, British Columbia	St. Cloud State (NCHC)	—
9	(United States)	Zane Demsey	Senior	D	6' 2" (1.88 m)	190 lb (86 kg)	2001-11-04	Harrison Township, Michigan	Miami (NCHC)	—
10	(United States)	Mathew Ward	Freshman	F	5' 9" (1.75 m)	168 lb (76 kg)	2004-01-24	Kamloops, British Columbia	Medicine Hat Tigers (WHL)	—
12	(Slovakia)	Peter Císar	Freshman	F	6' 0" (1.83 m)	176 lb (80 kg)	2005-05-30	Bratislava, Slovakia	Youngstown Phantoms (USHL)	—
13	(Canada)	Médrick Bolduc	Sophomore	F	5' 9" (1.75 m)	183 lb (83 kg)	2003-07-09	Val-d'Or, Quebec	El Paso Rhinos (NAHL)	—
14	(Czech Republic)	Jakub Altrichter	Sophomore	F	5' 10" (1.78 m)	154 lb (70 kg)	2003-07-26	Prague, Czech Republic	Waterloo Black Hawks (USHL)	—
15	(Canada)	Grayden Slipec	Sophomore	F	5' 10" (1.78 m)	190 lb (86 kg)	2005-03-06	Surrey, British Columbia	Chicago Steel (USHL)	—
16	(Canada)	Caiden Gault	Senior	F	6' 1" (1.85 m)	190 lb (86 kg)	2002-04-16	Oakbank, Manitoba	Ferris State (CCHA)	—
17	(Latvia)	Ģirts Silkalns	Sophomore	F	6' 2" (1.88 m)	187 lb (85 kg)	2003-06-30	Talsi, Latvia	Massachusetts Lowell (HEA)	—
18	(Canada)	Mikey Burchill	Freshman	F	5' 10" (1.78 m)	163 lb (74 kg)	2005-04-29	Mundelein, Illinois	Des Moines Buccaneers (USHL)	—
19	(Slovakia)	Tobias Pitka	Freshman	F	6' 4" (1.93 m)	225 lb (102 kg)	2006-04-28	Poprad, Slovakia	Victoria Grizzlies (BCHL)	—
20	(Canada)	Anthony Cliche	Sophomore	D	6' 4" (1.93 m)	216 lb (98 kg)	2003-06-09	Vallée-Jonction, Quebec	Vernon Vipers (BCHL)	—
21	(United States)	Tyler Stern	Freshman	F	5' 10" (1.78 m)	174 lb (79 kg)	2004-08-12	Plainview, New York	Maryland Black Bears (NAHL)	—
22	(United States)	Landon MacDonald	Freshman	F	6' 2" (1.88 m)	192 lb (87 kg)	2004-08-12	Brighton, Michigan	Madison Capitols (USHL)	—
23	(United States)	Evan Johnson	Freshman	D	5' 11" (1.8 m)	185 lb (84 kg)	2004-11-22	Trenton, Michigan	North Iowa Bulls (NAHL)	—
24	(Canada)	Kyle Bettens	Senior	F	6' 3" (1.91 m)	215 lb (98 kg)	2001-07-04	Winnipeg, Manitoba	Minnesota Duluth (NCHC)	—
27	(Canada)	Danny Ciccarello	Junior	F	6' 0" (1.83 m)	200 lb (91 kg)	2001-03-23	Kirkland, Quebec	Rensselaer (ECAC)	—
28	(United States)	Matt Argentina	Senior	F	5' 10" (1.78 m)	184 lb (83 kg)	2003-01-16	Philadelphia, Pennsylvania	Chilliwack Chiefs (BCHL)	—
29	(Canada)	Aidyn Hutchinson	Sophomore	F	6' 1" (1.85 m)	172 lb (78 kg)	2003-09-11	St. Albert, Alberta	Melfort Mustangs (SJHL)	—
30	(Canada)	Oliver Auyeung-Ashton	Freshman	G	5' 10" (1.78 m)	163 lb (74 kg)	2005-04-11	Coquitlam, British Columbia	Victoria Grizzlies (BCHL)	—
31	(Canada)	Jack Fuller	Freshman	G	6' 0" (1.83 m)	170 lb (77 kg)	2004-08-21	Centerville, Minnesota	New Mexico Ice Wolves (NAHL)	—

== Awards and honors ==
=== NCAA ===
Spencer Penrose Award

- Rick Comley: 1980, 1991

NCAA Scoring Champion

- Bill Joyce: 1980
- Scott Beattie: 1991

Tournament Most Outstanding Player

- Scott Beattie: 1991

AHCA First Team All-Americans

- 1980–81: Steve Bozek, F
- 1990–91: Brad Werenka, D; Scott Beattie, F
- 1991–92: Dallas Drake, F
- 2009–10: Mark Olver, D

AHCA Second Team All-Americans

- 1983–84: Bill Schafhauser, D
- 1986–87: Gary Emmons, F
- 1987–88: Phil Berger, F
- 1988–89: Darryl Olsen, D
- 1990–91: Bill Pye, G
- 1991–92: Jim Hiller, D
- 2004–05: Tuomas Tarkki, G
- 2005–06: Nathan Oystrick, D
- 2006–07: Mike Santorelli, F
- 2008–09: Erik Gustafsson, D
- 2009–10: Erik Gustafsson, D
- 2017–18: Philip Beaulieu, D
- 2018–19: Troy Loggins, F

=== WCHA ===
==== Individual awards ====
Player of the Year

- Scott Beattie: 1991
- Troy Loggins: 2019

Outstanding Student-Athlete of the Year

- Brad Werenka: 1991

Defensive player of the year

- Dallas Drake: 1992
- Philip Beaulieu: 2019

Rookie of the Year

- Scott Beattie: 1990
- Tony Szabo: 1991

Coach of the Year

- Rick Comley: 1989, 1991
- Grant Potulny: 2018

Most Valuable Player in tournament

- Bill Pye: 1989, 1991
- Corwin Saurdiff: 1992

==== All-conference teams ====
First Team All-WCHA

- 1985–86: Gary Emmons, F
- 1986–87: Gary Emmons, F
- 1987–88: Phil Berger, F
- 1988–89: Darryl Olsen, D
- 1990–91: Bill Pye, G; Brad Werenka, D; Scott Beattie, F
- 1991–92: Dallas Drake, F
- 1994–95: Greg Hadden, F
- 2017–18: Atte Tolvanen, G; Troy Loggins, F
- 2018–19: Atte Tolvanen, G; Philip Beaulieu, D; Troy Loggins, F

Second Team All-WCHA

- 1988–89: Phil Berger, F
- 1991–92: Jim Hiller, F
- 1992–93: Joe Frederick, F
- 1993–94: Mike Harding, F
- 2015–16: Darren Nowick, F; Dominik Shine, F
- 2016–17: Atte Tolvanen, G
- 2017–18: Philip Beaulieu, D; Adam Rockwood, F
- 2018–19: Adam Rockwood, F
- 2019–20: Philip Beaulieu, D; Griffin Loughran, F
- 2020–21: Joseph Nardi, F

Third Team All-WCHA

- 2014–15: Brock Maschmeyer, D
- 2016–17: Dominik Shine, F
- 2017–18: Darien Craighead, F; Robbie Payne, F
- 2019–20: Darien Craighead, F
- 2020–21: André Ghantous, F

WCHA All-Rookie Team

- 1990–91: Tony Szabo, F
- 1991–92: Corwin Saurdiff, G; Jason Helr, D
- 1993–94: Dean Seymour, F
- 1996–97: Buddy Smith, F
- 2015–16: Atte Tolvanen, G
- 2016–17: Darien Craighead, F
- 2019–20: John Hawthorne, G
- 2020–21: Rico DiMatteo, G

=== CCHA ===
==== Individual awards ====
Player of the Year

- Don Waddell: 1978
- Steve Weeks: 1980
- Jeff Pyle: 1981
- Tuomas Tarkki: 2005

Rookie of the Year

- Jeff Poeschl: 1981
- Gary Emmons: 1984
- Chris Gobert: 2000

Coach of the Year

- Rick Comley: 1980, 1981

Perani Cup

- Craig Kowalski: 2004

Best Offensive Defenseman

- Erik Gustafsson: 2009, 2010

Best Defensive Defenseman

- Nathan Oystrick: 2005

Best Goaltender

- Tuomas Tarkki: 2005

==== All-conference teams ====
First Team All-CCHA

- 1977–78: Don Waddell, D; Bill Joyce, F
- 1978–79: Tom Laidlaw, D
- 1979–80: Steve Weeks, G; Don Waddell, D; Tom Laidlaw, D; Steve Bozek, F; Bill Joyce, F
- 1980–81: Steve Bozek, F; Jeff Pyle, F
- 1999–00: Roger Trudeau, F
- 2004–05: Tuomas Tarkki, G; Nathan Oystrick, D
- 2005–06: Nathan Oystrick, D
- 2006–07: Mike Santorelli, F
- 2008–09: Erik Gustafsson, D
- 2009–10: Erik Gustafsson, D; Mark Olver, F
- 2011–12: Tyler Gron, F

Second Team All-CCHA

- 1978–79: Steve Weeks, G
- 1980–81: Jeff Poeschl, G
- 1998–99: J. P. Vigier, F
- 1999–00: Kevin Schmidt, D
- 2003–04: Nathan Oystrick, D
- 2011–12: Justin Florek, F
- 2021–22: AJ Vanderbeck, F
- 2022–23: André Ghantous, F
- 2023–24: Josh Zinger, D

CCHA All-Rookie Team

- 1998–99: Chad Theuer, F
- 1999–00: Jimmy Jackson, D; Chris Gobert, F
- 2004–05: Mike Santorelli, F
- 2007–08: Erik Gustafsson, D; Mark Olver, F
- 2010–11: Kevin Kapalka, G
- 2021–22: Charlie Glockner, G
- 2022–23: Béni Halász, G; Josh Zinger, D; Joey Larson, F
- 2024–25: Jakub Altrichter, F

== Northern Michigan Wildcats Hall of Fame ==
The following is a list of people associated with the Northern Michigan men's ice hockey program who were elected into the Northern Michigan Wildcats Hall of Fame (induction date in parentheses).

- Scott Beattie (2003)
- Joe Blake (2002)
- Steve Bozek (1991)
- Rick Comley (1998)
- Dallas Drake (2002)
- Gary Emmons (1999)
- Jim Hiller (2007)
- Bill Joyce (1998)
- Tom Laidlaw (1990)
- Jay McQuillan (2017)
- Mike Mielke (2009)
- Darryl Plandowski (2014)
- Bill Pye (2007)
- Bill Schafhauser (2008)
- Tuomas Tarkki (2013)
- Don Waddell (1993)
- Steve Weeks (1990)
- Brad Werenka (2002)
- 1979–80 Hockey Team (2017)
- 1990–91 Hockey Team (1998)

== Olympians ==
This is a list of Northern Michigan alumni who have played on an Olympic team.

Name	Position	Northern Michigan Tenure	Team	Year	Finish
Mark Beaufait	Center	1988–1992	(United States) USA	1994	8th
Bruno Campese	Goaltender	1981–1982	(Italy) ITA	1994	9th
Phil DeGaetano	Defenseman	1981–1985	(Italy) ITA	1994	9th
Eric LeMarque	Center	1986–1990	(France) FRA	1994	10th
Brad Werenka	Defenseman	1986–1991	(Canada) CAN	1994	Silver
Erik Gustafsson	Defenseman	2007–2010	(Sweden) SWE	2018	5th

== Wildcats in the NHL ==
As of July 1, 2025.

= NHL All-Star team	= NHL All-Star	= NHL All-Star and NHL All-Star team	= Hall of Famers

Player	Position	Team(s)	Years	Games	Stanley Cups
Mark Beaufait	Center	SJS	1992–1993	5	0
Steve Bozek	Forward	LAK, CGY, STL, VAN, SJS	1981–1992	641	0
Jared Coreau	Goaltender	DET	2016–2018	21	0
Dallas Drake	Right wing	DET, WPG, PHO, STL	1992–2008	1,009	1
Gary Emmons	Center	SJS	1993–1994	3	0
Justin Florek	Forward	BOS	2013–2014	4	0
Erik Gustafsson	Defenseman	PHI	2010–2014	91	0
Viking Gustafsson Nyberg	Defenseman	MIN	2026-present	2	0
Keith Hanson	Defenseman	CGY	1983–1984	25	0
Jim Hiller	Right wing	LAK, DET, NYR	1992–1994	63	0
Dieter Kochan	Goaltender	TBL, MIN	1999–2003	21	0
Tom Laidlaw	Defenseman	NYR, LAK	1980–1990	705	0

Player	Position	Team(s)	Years	Games	Stanley Cups
Darryl Olsen	Defenseman	CGY	1991–1992	1	0
Mark Olver	Center	COL	2010–2013	74	0
Nathan Oystrick	Defenseman	ATL, ANA, STL	2008–2011	65	0
Mike Santorelli	Center	NSH, FLA, WIN, VAN, TOR, ANA	2008–2016	406	0
Dominik Shine	Right Wing	DET	2024–present	9	0
Mike Stutzel	Left wing	PHO	2003–2004	9	0
J. P. Vigier	Right wing	ATL	2000–2007	213	0
Don Waddell	Defenseman	LAK	1980–1981	1	0
Ed Ward	Right wing	QUE, CGY, ATL, ANA, NJD	1993–2001	278	0
Steve Weeks	Goaltender	NYR, HFD, VAN, NYI, LAK, OTT	1980–1993	290	0
Brad Werenka	Defenseman	EDM, QUE, CHI, PIT, CGY	1992–2001	320	0

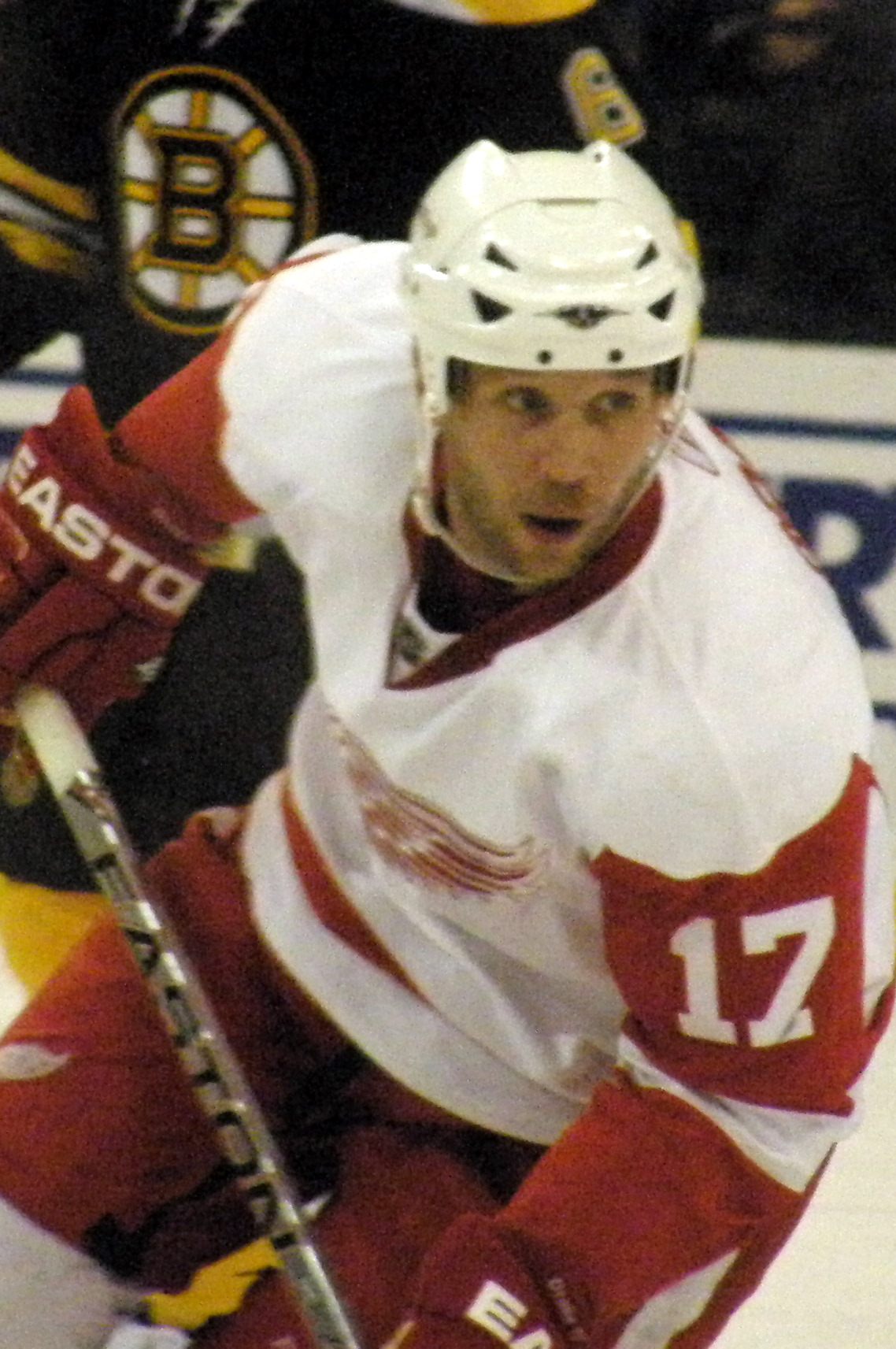
Dallas Drake

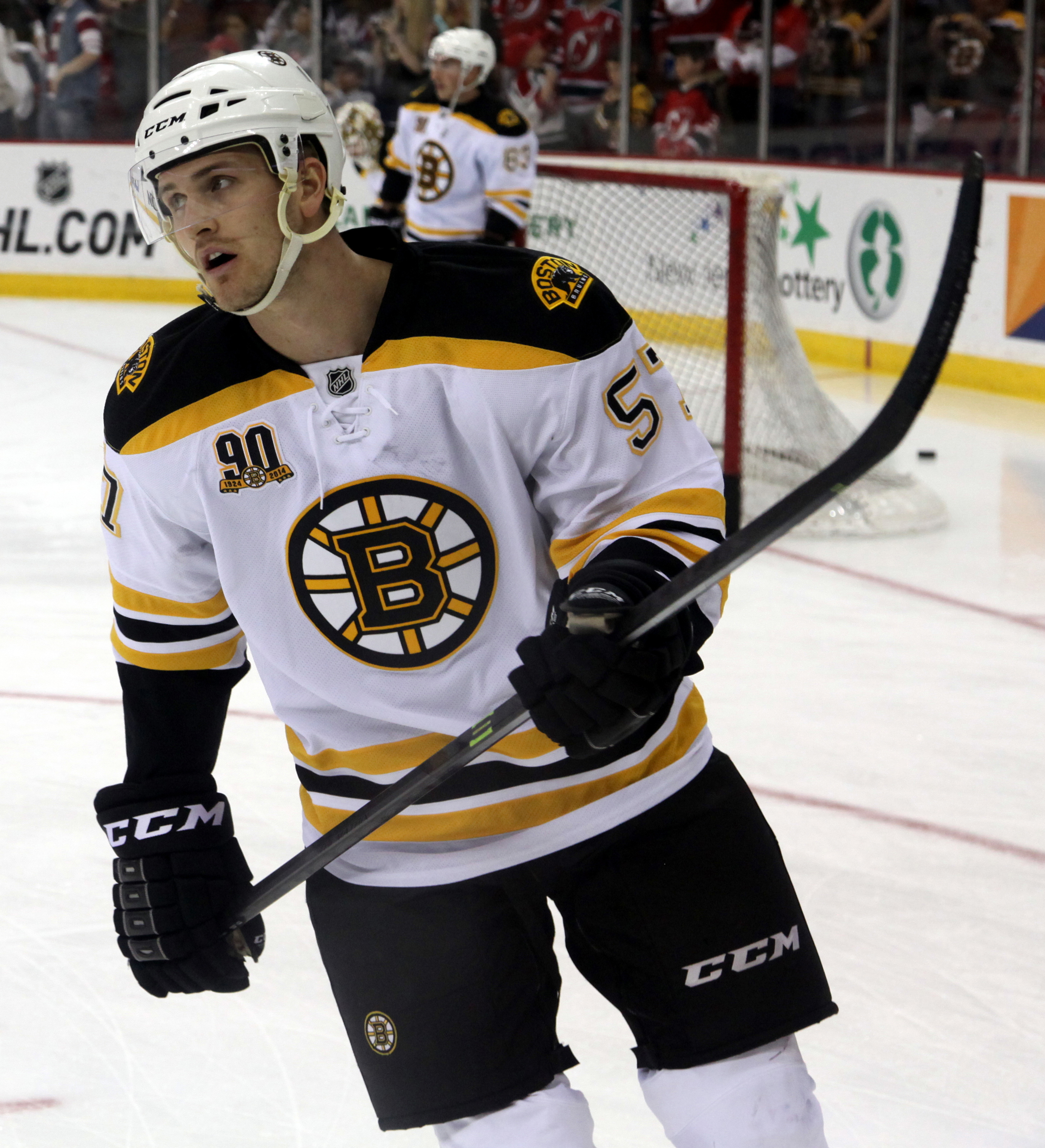
Justin Florek

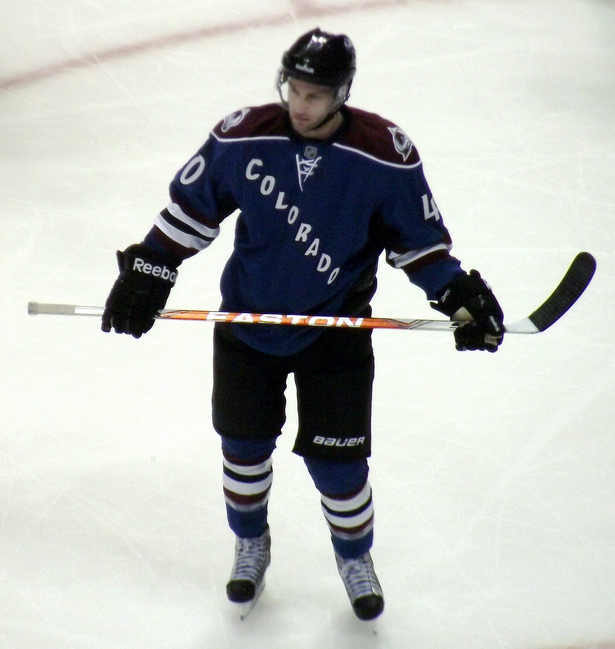
Mark Olver

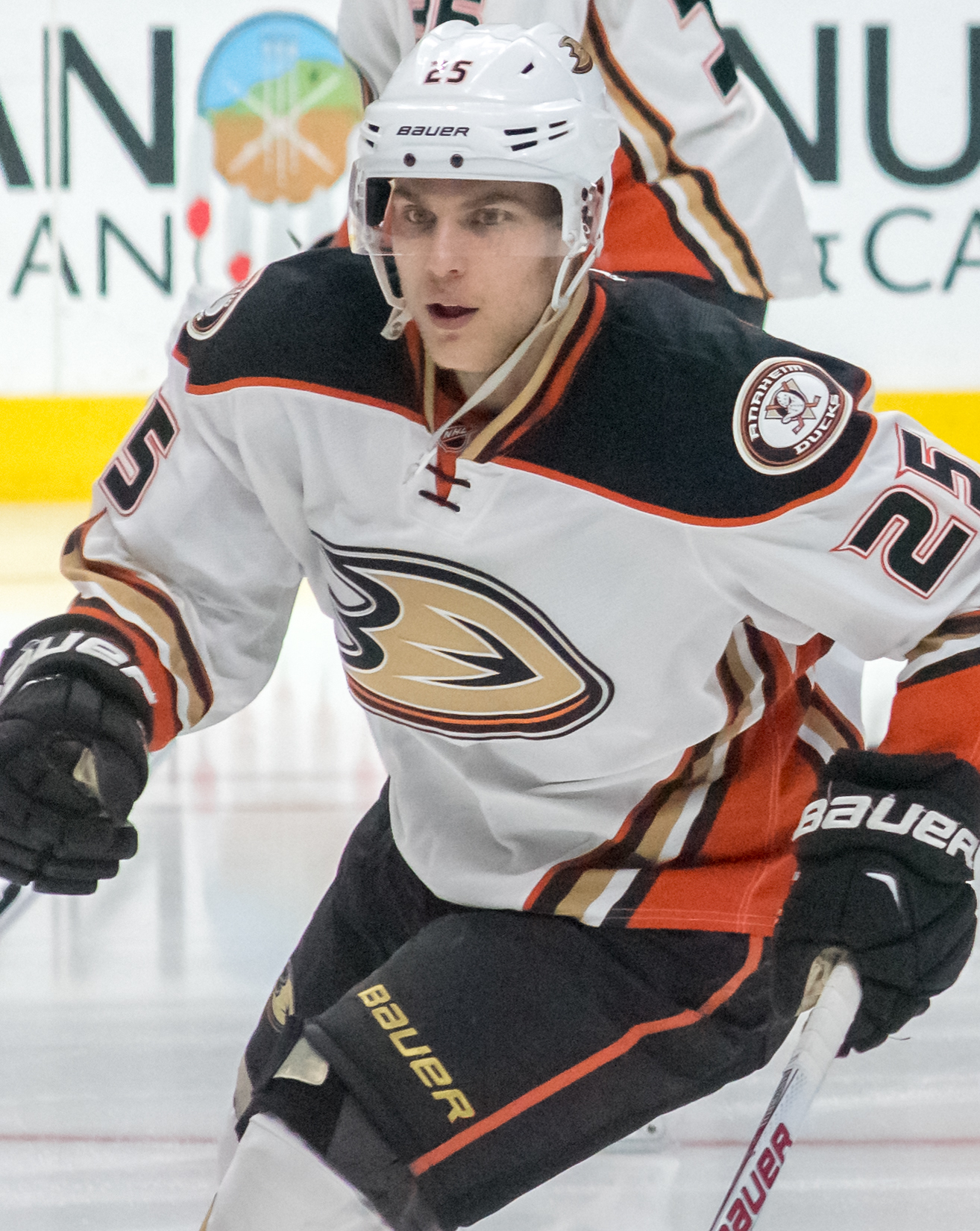
Mike Santorelli

=== Notable players ===
Dual US/French citizen Eric LeMarque went on to play for Team France at the 1994 Winter Olympics, later losing his feet to frostbite in a mishap chronicled in autobiography and in the 2017 film 6 Below: Miracle on the Mountain.

== Arena ==
The Wildcats play at the 3,902-seat Berry Events Center on the NMU campus in Marquette, Michigan. The arena has been the home of the Wildcats since 1999, replacing Lakeview Arena which had been the home to NMU hockey since the program began in 1976.

== Pageantry ==
=== Puckheads ===
The Puckheads are a group of fans of the Wildcats hockey team, made up of students as well as community residents. In the words of a Michigan Daily feature article, "The Puckheads have created an atmosphere that makes the Berry Events Center one of the most entertaining and frustrating road trips for other teams in the CCHA."

The Puckheads were founded in November 1996 at Lakeview Arena. They travel and follow the team on many occasions, and have established rivalries with other teams' fan groups, notably the "Red Army" supporters of the Nebraska–Omaha Mavericks.
