= 1981 CCHA men's ice hockey tournament =

1981 CCHA Men's ice hockey tournament
- Dates: March 6–14, 1981
- Teams: 4
- Finals site: Lakeview Arena; Marquette, Michigan
- Champions: Northern Michigan (2nd title)
- Winning coach: Rick Comley (2nd title)
- CCHA Men's Ice Hockey Tournaments

The 1981 CCHA Men's Ice Hockey Tournament was the tenth CCHA Men's Ice Hockey Tournament. It was played between March 6 and March 14, 1981. All games were played at Lakeview Arena in Marquette, Michigan, the home venue of the Northern Michigan Wildcats. By winning the tournament, Northern Michigan received the Central Collegiate Hockey Association's automatic bid to the 1981 NCAA Division I Men's Ice Hockey Tournament, the first automatic bid for the conference.

== Format ==
The tournament featured two rounds of play. Only the top four teams in the conference standings were eligible for postseason play. Each of the two rounds were structured so that the two teams facing one another would play two games and the winner would be decided by the goal differential totals of the combined scores. In the semifinal the first and fourth seeds and the second and third seeds were matched as opponents. The victorious teams would then compete in the finals for the conference championship. The tournament champion receives an automatic bid to the 1981 NCAA Division I Men's Ice Hockey Tournament.

== Conference standings ==
Note: GP = Games played; W = Wins; L = Losses; T = Ties; PTS = Points; GF = Goals For; GA = Goals Against

1980–81 Central Collegiate Hockey Association standings
	Conference							Overall					
	GP	W	L	T	PTS	GF	GA	GP	W	L	T	GF	GA
Northern Michigan†*	22	18	4	0	36	115	81	44	27	14	3	201	158
Ohio State	22	15	6	1	31	107	82	39	24	12	3	189	149
Ferris State	22	13	9	0	26	101	92	36	20	14	2	166	144
Bowling Green	22	10	12	0	20	98	99	39	13	24	2	153	188
Western Michigan	22	8	13	1	17	99	107	36	15	19	2	178	165
Lake Superior State	22	6	15	1	13	101	134	36	14	21	1	183	202
Miami^	12	0	11	1	1	42	68	35	16	17	2	174	142
Championship: Northern Michigan † indicates conference regular season champion * indicates conference tournament champion^ Only Miami's road games were counted for conference standings

== Bracket ==
Semifinals; March 6–7
1	Northern Michigan	3	10
4	Bowling Green	3	2
2	Ohio State	5	3
3	Ferris State	3	3

Championship; March 13–14
1	Northern Michigan	2	4
2	Ohio State	2	2

Note: * denotes overtime period(s)

=== Semifinals ===
==== (1) Northern Michigan vs. (4) Bowling Green ====
March 6	Northern Michigan	3 – 3	Bowling Green	Lakeview Arena

March 7	Northern Michigan	10 – 2	Bowling Green	Lakeview Arena

Northern Michigan won series 13-5

==== (2) Ohio State vs. (3) Ferris State ====
March 6	Ohio State	5 – 3	Ferris State	Lakeview Arena

March 7	Ohio State	3 – 3	Ferris State	Lakeview Arena

Ohio State won series 8-6

=== Championship ===
==== (1) Northern Michigan vs. (2) Ohio State ====
March 13	Northern Michigan	2 – 2	Ohio State	Lakeview Arena

March 14	Northern Michigan	4 – 2	Ohio State	Lakeview Arena

Northern Michigan won series 6-4

== Tournament awards ==
=== MVP ===
- None
