= 1980 CCHA men's ice hockey tournament =

Sports tournament

1980 CCHA Men's ice hockey tournament
- Dates: March 7–15, 1980
- Teams: 4
- Finals site: Lakeview Arena; Marquette, Michigan
- Champions: Northern Michigan (1st title)
- Winning coach: Rick Comley (1st title)
- CCHA Men's Ice Hockey Tournaments

The 1980 CCHA Men's Ice Hockey Tournament was the ninth CCHA Men's Ice Hockey Tournament. It was played between March 7 and March 15, 1980. All games were played at Lakeview Arena in Marquette, Michigan, the home venue of the Northern Michigan Wildcats. By winning the tournament, Northern Michigan received the Central Collegiate Hockey Association's invitation to play in a first round game created to allow entrance into the tournament for the CCHA.

== Format ==
The tournament featured two rounds of play. Only the top four teams in the conference standings were eligible for postseason play. Each of the two rounds were structured so that the two teams facing one another would play two games and the winner would be decided by the goal differential totals of the combined scores. In the semifinal the first and fourth seeds and the second and third seeds were matched as opponents. The victorious teams would then compete in the finals for the conference championship. The tournament champion was invited to play in a first round game in the 1980 NCAA Division I Men's Ice Hockey Tournament.

== Conference standings ==
Note: GP = Games played; W = Wins; L = Losses; T = Ties; PTS = Points; GF = Goals For; GA = Goals Against

1979–80 Central Collegiate Hockey Association standings
	Conference							Overall					
	GP	W	L	T	PTS	GF	GA	GP	W	L	T	GF	GA
Northern Michigan†*	20	17	3	0	34	113	63	41	34	6	1	239	128
Ohio State	20	14	5	1	29	111	70	38	25	10	3	192	123
Ferris State	20	11	9	0	22	108	94	38	26	11	1	214	156
Bowling Green	20	9	11	0	18	87	90	38	16	20	2	161	174
Western Michigan	20	6	13	1	13	95	119	36	18	16	2	196	182
Lake Superior State	20	2	18	0	4	63	140	34	12	21	1	158	201
Championship: Northern Michigan † indicates conference regular season champion * indicates conference tournament champion

== Bracket ==
Semifinals; March 7–8
1	Northern Michigan	3	11
4	Bowling Green	3	3
2	Ohio State	4	4
3	Ferris State	4	8

Championship; March 13–14
1	Northern Michigan	7	8
3	Ferris State	3	6

Note: * denotes overtime period(s)

=== Semifinals ===
==== (1) Northern Michigan vs. (4) Bowling Green ====
March 7	Northern Michigan	11 – 3	Bowling Green	Lakeview Arena

March 8	Northern Michigan	3 – 3	Bowling Green	Lakeview Arena

Northern Michigan won series 14-6

==== (2) Ohio State vs. (3) Ferris State ====
March 7	Ohio State	4 – 4	Ferris State	Lakeview Arena

March 8	Ohio State	4 – 8	Ferris State	Lakeview Arena

Ferris State won series 12-8

=== Championship ===
==== (1) Northern Michigan vs. (3) Ferris State ====
March 14	Northern Michigan	7 – 3	Ferris State	Lakeview Arena

March 15	Northern Michigan	8 – 6	Ferris State	Lakeview Arena

Northern Michigan won series 15-9

== Tournament awards ==
=== MVP ===
- None
