= 1991 WCHA men's ice hockey tournament =

1991 WCHA Men's ice hockey tournament
- Dates: March 1–11, 1991
- Teams: 8
- Finals site: Civic Center; St. Paul, Minnesota
- Champions: Northern Michigan (2nd title)
- Winning coach: Rick Comley (2nd title)
- MVP: Bill Pye (Northern Michigan)
- Attendance: 44,287
- WCHA Men's Ice Hockey Tournaments

The 1991 WCHA Men's Ice Hockey Tournament was the 32nd conference playoff in league history and 39th season where a WCHA champion was crowned. The tournament was played between March 1 and March 11, 1991. First round games were played at home team campus sites, while all "Final Four" matches were held at the Civic Center in St. Paul, Minnesota. By winning the tournament, Northern Michigan was awarded the Broadmoor Trophy and received the WCHA's automatic bid to the 1991 NCAA Division I Men's Ice Hockey Tournament.

== Format ==
The first round of the postseason tournament featured a best-of-three games format. The team that finished ninth in the conference was not eligible for tournament play. Teams were seeded No. 1 through No. 8 according to their final conference standing, with a tiebreaker system used to seed teams with an identical number of points accumulated. The top four seeded teams each earned home ice and hosted one of the lower seeded teams.

The winners of the first round series advanced to the semifinal and championship rounds held at the Civic Center. All Final Four games used a single-elimination format. Teams were re-seeded No. 1 through No. 4 according to the final regular season conference standings, with the top remaining seed matched against lowest remaining seed in one semifinal game while the two other semifinalists meeting with the winners advancing to the championship game and the losers competing in a Third Place contest. The Tournament Champion received an automatic bid to the 1991 NCAA Division I Men's Ice Hockey Tournament.

=== Conference standings ===
Note: GP = Games played; W = Wins; L = Losses; T = Ties; PTS = Points; GF = Goals For; GA = Goals Against

1990–91 Western Collegiate Hockey Association standings
| | Conference | | | | | | | Overall | | | | | |
| | GP | W | L | T | PTS | GF | GA | GP | W | L | T | GF | GA |
|---|---|---|---|---|---|---|---|---|---|---|---|---|---|
| Northern Michigan†* | 32 | 25 | 3 | 4 | 54 | 185 | 89 | 47 | 38 | 5 | 4 | 283 | 133 |
| Minnesota | 32 | 22 | 5 | 5 | 49 | 151 | 97 | 45 | 30 | 10 | 5 | 215 | 142 |
| Wisconsin | 32 | 19 | 11 | 2 | 40 | 132 | 108 | 44 | 26 | 15 | 3 | 174 | 143 |
| North Dakota | 32 | 18 | 12 | 2 | 38 | 148 | 127 | 43 | 24 | 17 | 2 | 207 | 171 |
| St. Cloud State | 32 | 12 | 16 | 4 | 28 | 124 | 152 | 41 | 18 | 19 | 4 | 170 | 186 |
| Minnesota-Duluth | 32 | 11 | 15 | 6 | 28 | 114 | 133 | 40 | 14 | 19 | 7 | 142 | 164 |
| Michigan Tech | 32 | 9 | 21 | 2 | 20 | 105 | 134 | 41 | 13 | 25 | 3 | 139 | 164 |
| Colorado College | 32 | 9 | 22 | 1 | 19 | 106 | 139 | 40 | 13 | 26 | 1 | 129 | 169 |
| Denver | 32 | 5 | 25 | 2 | 12 | 95 | 182 | 38 | 6 | 30 | 2 | 109 | 224 |
Championship: Northern Michigan † indicates conference regular season champion * indicates conference tournament champion

== Bracket ==
Teams are reseeded after the first round

First Round; March 1–3
1 | Northern Michigan | 7 | 6 | —
8 | Colorado College | 0 | 3 | —
2 | Minnesota | 5 | 6 | —
7 | Michigan Tech | 3 | 5 | —
(Pairings are reseeded after the first round)
3 | Wisconsin | 5 | 5 | —
6 | Minnesota-Duluth | 1 | 2 | —
4 | North Dakota | 2 | 10 | 7
5 | St. Cloud State | 4 | 2 | 4

Semifinals; March 10
1 | Northern Michigan | 8
4 | North Dakota | 4
2 | Minnesota | 3
3 | Wisconsin | 2

Championship; March 11
1 | Northern Michigan | 4
2 | Minnesota | 2
Third place
3 | Wisconsin | 2
4 | North Dakota | 5

Note: * denotes overtime period(s)

=== First round ===
==== (1) Northern Michigan vs. (8) Colorado College ====
| March 1 | Northern Michigan | 7 – 0 | Colorado College | Lakeview Arena |

| March 2 | Northern Michigan | 6 – 3 | Colorado College | Lakeview Arena |

| Northern Michigan won series 2–0 |

==== (2) Minnesota vs. (7) Michigan Tech ====
| March 1 | Minnesota | 5 – 3 | Michigan Tech | Mariucci Arena |

| March 2 | Minnesota | 6 – 5 | Michigan Tech | Mariucci Arena |

| Minnesota won series 2–0 |

==== (3) Wisconsin vs. (6) Minnesota-Duluth ====
| March 2 | Wisconsin | 5 – 1 | Minnesota-Duluth | Dane County Coliseum |

| March 3 | Wisconsin | 5 – 2 | Minnesota-Duluth | Dane County Coliseum |

| Wisconsin won series 2–0 |

==== (4) North Dakota vs. (5) St. Cloud State ====
| March 1 | North Dakota | 2 – 4 | St. Cloud State | Ralph Engelstad Arena |

| March 2 | North Dakota | 10 – 2 | St. Cloud State | Ralph Engelstad Arena |

| March 3 | North Dakota | 7 – 4 | St. Cloud State | Ralph Engelstad Arena |

| North Dakota won series 2–1 |

=== Semifinals ===
==== (1) Northern Michigan vs. (4) North Dakota ====
| March 10 | Northern Michigan | 8 – 4 | North Dakota | Civic Center |

==== (2) Minnesota vs. (3) Wisconsin ====
| March 10 | Minnesota | 3 – 2 | Wisconsin | Civic Center |

=== Third Place ===
==== (3) Wisconsin vs. (4) North Dakota ====
| March 11 | Wisconsin | 2 – 5 | North Dakota | Civic Center |

=== Championship ===
==== (1) Northern Michigan vs. (2) Minnesota ====
| March 11 | Northern Michigan | 4 – 2 | Minnesota | Civic Center |

== Tournament awards ==
=== All-Tournament Team ===
- F Mark Beaufait (Northern Michigan)
- F Greg Johnson (North Dakota)
- F Larry Olimb (Minnesota)
- D Sean Hill (Wisconsin)
- D Brad Werenka (Northern Michigan)
- G Jeff Stolp (Minnesota)

=== MVP ===
- Bill Pye (Northern Michigan)

== See also ==
- Western Collegiate Hockey Association men's champions
