= WCHA Most Outstanding Player in Tournament =

- Sport: Ice hockey
- Awarded for: To the Most Outstanding Player in the WCHA conference tournament.

History
- First award: 1988
- Editions: 34
- Final award: 2021
- First winner: Dean Anderson
- Most wins: Bill Pye (2)
- Most recent: Ashton Calder

The WCHA Most Outstanding Player in Tournament was an annual award given out at the conclusion of the WCHA tournament to the best player in the championship as voted by the head coaches of each member team.

The Tournament MVP was first awarded in 1988 and every year thereafter. The award was changed from 'most valuable' to 'most outstanding' for the 2017 tournament.

Bill Pye is the only player to have won the award more than once. Additionally, two recipients have received the honor while not playing for the conference champion.

== Award winners ==
Year	Winner	Position	School
1988	Dean Anderson	Goaltender	Wisconsin
1989	Bill Pye	Goaltender	Northern Michigan
1990	Steve Rohlik	Left wing	Wisconsin
1991	Bill Pye	Goaltender	Northern Michigan
1992	Corwin Saurdiff	Goaltender	Northern Michigan
1993	Travis Richards	Defenceman	Minnesota
1994	Chris McAlpine	Defenceman	Minnesota
1995	Kirk Daubenspeck	Goaltender	Wisconsin
1996	Brian Bonin	Center	Minnesota
1997	David Hoogsteen	Left wing	North Dakota
1998	Joe Bianchi	Center	Wisconsin
1999	Stephen Wagner	Goaltender	Denver
2000	Lee Goren	Right wing	North Dakota
2001	Tyler Arnason	Center	St. Cloud State
2002	Wade Dubielewicz	Goaltender	Denver
2003	Grant Potulny	Center	Minnesota
2004	Kellen Briggs	Goaltender	Minnesota

Note: * recipient not on championship team

Year	Winner	Position	School
2005	Brett Sterling*	Left wing	Colorado College
2006	Jordan Parise	Goaltender	North Dakota
2007	Blake Wheeler	Right wing	Minnesota
2008	Alex Kangas*	Goaltender	Minnesota
2009	Alex Stalock	Goaltender	Minnesota Duluth
2010	Evan Trupp	Left wing	North Dakota
2011	Matt Frattin	Right wing	North Dakota
2012	Aaron Dell	Goaltender	North Dakota
2013	Nic Kerdiles	Center	Wisconsin
2014	Cole Huggins	Goaltender	Minnesota State
2015	Brad McClure	Forward	Minnesota State
2016	Darren Smith	Goaltender	Ferris State
2017	Shane Hanna	Defenceman	Michigan Tech
2018	Patrick Munson	Goaltender	Michigan Tech
2019	Nick Rivera	Forward	Minnesota State
2020	Not awarded due to the coronavirus pandemic		
2021	Ashton Calder	Forward	Lake Superior State

=== Winners by school ===
School	Winners
Minnesota (Note: Minnesota and Wisconsin left after the 2012-13 season to join the Big Ten.)	7
North Dakota (Note: North Dakota, Denver, Colorado College, Minnesota-Duluth, and St. Cloud State left after the 2012-13 season to join the NCHC.)	6
Wisconsin	5
Minnesota State	3
Northern Michigan	3
Michigan Tech	2
Denver	2
Colorado College	1
Ferris State	1
Lake Superior State	1
Minnesota Duluth	1
St. Cloud State	1

=== Winners by position ===
Position	Winners
Center	5
Right wing	3
Left wing	3
Forward	3
Defenceman	3
Goaltender	15

== See also ==
- WCHA Awards
