= Gary Emmons =

Canadian ice hockey player

- Born: December 30, 1963 (age 62) Winnipeg, Manitoba, Canada
- Height: 5 ft 9 in (175 cm)
- Weight: 180 lb (82 kg; 12 st 12 lb)
- Position: Centre
- Shot: Right
- Played for: San Jose Sharks
- NHL draft: 1986 NHL Supplemental Draft; New York Rangers
- Playing career: 1987–1997

Gary Grant Emmons (born December 30, 1963) is a Canadian former professional ice hockey centre who played for the San Jose Sharks of the National Hockey League (NHL), as well as several teams in the International Hockey League (IHL).

== Career statistics ==
=== Regular season and playoffs ===
			Regular season					Playoffs
Season	Team	League	GP	G	A	Pts	PIM	GP	G	A	Pts	PIM
1983–84	Northern Michigan University	CCHA	40	28	21	49	42	—	—	—	—	—
1984–85	Northern Michigan University	CCHA	40	25	28	53	22	—	—	—	—	—
1985–86	Northern Michigan University	CCHA	36	45	30	75	34	—	—	—	—	—
1986–87	Northern Michigan University	CCHA	35	32	34	66	59	—	—	—	—	—
1987–88	Milwaukee Admirals	IHL	13	3	4	7	4	—	—	—	—	—
1987–88	Nova Scotia Oilers	AHL	59	18	27	45	22	—	—	—	—	—
1988–89	Genève-Servette HC	NLB	6	2	4	6	6	—	—	—	—	—
1988–89	Canadian National Team	Intl	49	16	26	42	42	—	—	—	—	—
1989–90	Kalamazoo Wings	IHL	81	41	59	100	38	8	2	7	9	2
1990–91	Klagenfurt AC	AUT	8	2	2	4	0	—	—	—	—	—
1990–91	Kalamazoo Wings	IHL	62	25	33	58	26	11	5	8	13	6
1991–92	Kansas City Blades	IHL	80	29	54	83	60	15	6	13	19	8
1992–93	Kansas City Blades	IHL	80	37	44	81	80	12	7	6	13	8
1993–94	Kansas City Blades	IHL	63	20	49	69	28	—	—	—	—	—
1993–94	San Jose Sharks	NHL	3	1	0	1	0	—	—	—	—	—
1994–95	Kansas City Blades	IHL	81	22	38	60	42	21	9	19	28	24
1995–96	Kansas City Blades	IHL	73	24	39	63	72	1	0	0	0	4
1996–97	Kansas City Blades	IHL	67	15	30	45	36	3	0	1	1	4
IHL totals			600	216	350	566	386	71	29	54	83	56
NHL totals			3	1	0	1	0	—	—	—	—	—

== Awards and honours ==
Award	Year
All-WCHA First Team	1985–86
All-WCHA First Team	1986–87
AHCA West Second-Team All-American	1986–87

Awards and achievements
Preceded by Chris Seychel	CCHA Rookie of the Year; 1983–84; Shared With; Bill Shibicky	Succeeded by Paul Ysebaert
