= Scott Beattie =

Canadian-Italian ice hockey player and coach

- Born: May 16, 1968 (age 58) Kimberley, British Columbia, Canada
- Height: 5 ft 7 in (170 cm)
- Weight: 170 lb (77 kg; 12 st 2 lb)
- Position: Center
- Shot: Right
- Played for: Bolzano; Detroit Falcons; Hershey Bears; Saint John Flames; South Carolina Stingrays; Milano; Star Bulls Rosenheim; HC Thurgau; HC Davos; Genève-Servette HC
- National team: Italy
- NHL draft: Undrafted
- Playing career: 1987–2005

Scott Beattie (born May 16, 1968) is a Canadian-Italian former professional ice hockey player and coach. Beattie led the NCAA in scoring during his sophomore season with Northern Michigan, earning several accolades to go along with the 1991 National Title.

== Career ==
Beattie joined Northern Michigan in 1989 as a 21-year-old. A few years older than a typical freshman, Beattie's small size was a contributing factor in late arrival to the college ranks. His chance came after recording 224 points in the SJHL over the previous two seasons. Beattie brought instant offense to the Wildcats, leading the team in scoring as a freshman with 59 points. The next year Beattie exploded for 48 goals and 89 points to lead the entire NCAA in scoring and was named WCHA Player of the Year for his efforts (the only such award for Northern Michigan). With Beattie leading the attack the Wildcats won the WCHA regular season title for the first and (as of 2018) only time as well as capturing the WCHA tournament for the second time in three seasons. In the NCAA tournament Northern Michigan dominated upstart Alaska–Anchorage in both games before dispatching top eastern-seed Maine. The Wildcats netted 18 goals in the three games and they would need every bit of that offense in the title tile against Boston University as the Terriers put up 7 goals in regulation. Beattie was there to help the Wildcats match BU and the game went into overtime. The highest-scoring championship game in 34 years went the Wildcats way in the third extra frame and gave Northern Michigan its first National Title. Beattie played another year in Marquette as team captain, winning a second conference tournament, but was unable to recapture the same magic as in '91 and turned pro after his junior campaign.

Beattie had little interest from teams across North America so he played his first professional game for HC Bolzano of the Serie A in Italy. After a good season and a half he returned to the States and spent a brief time with the Detroit Falcons, Hershey Bears, South Carolina Stingrays and Saint John Flames before heading back to Italy. After a year with Milan Saima SG he was back with HC Bolzano and joined the Italian national team for the 1996 Men's World Ice Hockey Championships. Beattie spent the following year mostly with Rosenheim Star Bulls in Germany's DEL before beginning a four-year stint with four separate teams across two Swiss national leagues. During the time Beattie appeared twice more for Team Italy in international tournaments before signing on with Milano and winning three consecutive league titles. Beattie played one more year with HC Bolzano before retiring as a player in 2005.

Beattie was not idle for long as he became the GM/head coach for his hometown Kimberley Dynamiters before joining the Kootenay Ice as an assistant coach in 2008. He was an associate coach with the Tri-City Americans in 2010–11 and a year later EHC Olten named him as their head coach. Beattie was fired in November 2014 but just over a year later got his second top job with EHC Visp. That job lasted only a few months before he was promoted to the parent club SCL Tigers which, too, kept him around for only a few months before he was let go in October 2016.

== Career statistics ==
=== Regular season and playoffs ===
			Regular season					Playoffs
Season	Team	League	GP	G	A	Pts	PIM	GP	G	A	Pts	PIM
1986–87	Melville Millionaires	SJHL	57	35	23	58	49	—	—	—	—	—
1987–88	Melville Millionaires	SJHL	58	48	54	102	92	—	—	—	—	—
1988–89	Melville Millionaires	SJHL	59	63	64	127	52	—	—	—	—	—
1989–90	Northern Michigan University	WCHA	36	30	29	59	24	—	—	—	—	—
1990–91	Northern Michigan University	WCHA	46	48	41	89	66	—	—	—	—	—
1991–92	Northern Michigan University	WCHA	40	28	46	74	80	—	—	—	—	—
1992–93	HC Bolzano	ITA	16	9	14	23	20	11	8	5	13	19
1992–93	HC Bolzano	AL	31	26	34	60	49	—	—	—	—	—
1993–94	Detroit Falcons	CoHL	3	2	4	6	2	—	—	—	—	—
1993–94	South Carolina Stingrays	ECHL	29	20	28	48	40	—	—	—	—	—
1993–94	Saint John Flames	AHL	2	0	0	0	2	—	—	—	—	—
1993–94	HC Bolzano	AL	—	—	—	—	—	10	8	8	16	8
1994–95	HC Milano Saima	ITA	36	23	22	45	40	7	11	4	15	6
1994–95	HC Milano Saima	AL	11	6	5	11	10	—	—	—	—	—
1995–96	HC Bolzano	ITA	32	26	38	64	6	13	12	9	21	14
1995–96	HC Bolzano	AL	10	5	5	10	14	—	—	—	—	—
1996–97	Star Bulls Rosenheim	DEL	49	23	35	58	103	3	2	1	3	20
1996–97	HC Bolzano	ITA	—	—	—	—	—	5	2	3	5	16
1997–98	ZSC Lions	NDA	32	10	11	21	24	—	—	—	—	—
1998–99	HC Thurgau	SUI.2	40	28	38	66	72	—	—	—	—	—
1998–99	HC Davos	NDA	—	—	—	—	—	5	2	1	3	8
1999–2000	Genève-Servette HC	SUI.2	35	19	35	54	24	9	5	3	8	8
2000–01	Genève-Servette HC	SUI.2	40	24	45	69	56	7	6	8	14	8
2001–02	Milano Vipers	ITA	25	12	18	30	38	10	7	12	19	14
2002–03	Milano Vipers	ITA	32	18	31	49	34	9	5	9	14	8
2003–04	Milano Vipers	ITA	30	17	37	54	28	12	5	9	14	10
2004–05	HC Bolzano	ITA	21	9	15	24	18	8	5	1	6	10
ITA totals			192	114	175	289	184	75	55	52	107	97
SUI.2 totals			115	71	118	189	152	16	11	11	22	16

=== International ===
Year	Team	Event	GP	G	A	Pts	PIM
1996	Italy	WC	5	0	0	0	0
1999	Italy	WC Q	3	0	2	2	4
2000	Italy	OGQ	3	0	1	1	2
2001	Italy	WC	6	0	1	1	2
Totals			17	0	4	4	8

== Awards and honors ==
Award	Year
All-WCHA First Team	1990–91
AHCA West First-Team All-American	1990–91
All-NCAA All-Tournament Team	1991

Awards and achievements
Preceded by Curtis Joseph	WCHA Freshman of the Year; 1989–90	Succeeded by Tony Szabo
Preceded by Gary Shuchuk	WCHA Most Valuable Player; 1990–91	Succeeded by Duane Derksen
Preceded by Kip Miller	NCAA Ice Hockey Scoring Champion; 1990–91	Succeeded by Denny Felsner
Preceded by Chris Tancill	NCAA Tournament Most Outstanding Player; 1991	Succeeded by Paul Constantin
