= Phil DeGaetano =

Italian ice hockey player

Personal information
- Nationality: Italian
- Born: 9 August 1963 (age 61); New York City, U.S.

Sport
- Sport: Ice hockey

Phil DeGaetano (born 9 August 1963) is an Italian ice hockey player. He competed in the men's tournament at the 1994 Winter Olympics.
