= Brad Werenka =

Canadian ice hockey player

- Born: February 12, 1969 (age 57) Two Hills, Alberta, Canada
- Height: 6 ft 2 in (188 cm)
- Weight: 205 lb (93 kg; 14 st 9 lb)
- Position: Defence
- Shot: Left
- Played for: Edmonton Oilers; Quebec Nordiques; Chicago Blackhawks; Pittsburgh Penguins; Calgary Flames
- National team: Canada
- NHL draft: 42nd overall, 1987; Edmonton Oilers
- Playing career: 1991–2000

Brad Werenka
Medal record

Representing Canada

Men's ice hockey

Olympic Games
Silver medal – second place	1994 Lillehammer	Tournament

John Bradley Werenka (born February 12, 1969) is a Canadian former professional ice hockey defenceman. He was drafted by the Edmonton Oilers in the second round of the 1987 NHL entry draft, 42nd overall. Werenka played college hockey for the Northern Michigan University Wildcats, with whom he won the 1991 NCAA hockey title. In addition to his minor pro experience, Werenka went on to play for the Oilers, Quebec Nordiques, Chicago Blackhawks, Pittsburgh Penguins, and Calgary Flames. His career was ended December 29, 2000 due to a concussion suffered in a game. He represented Canada at the 1994 Winter Olympics, winning a silver medal and being named to the All-Star Team.

== Awards and honors ==
Award	Year
All-WCHA First Team	1990–91
AHCA West First-Team All-American	1990–91
WCHA All-Tournament Team	1991
All-NCAA All-Tournament Team	1991

== Career statistics ==
=== Regular season and playoffs ===
			Regular season					Playoffs
Season	Team	League	GP	G	A	Pts	PIM	GP	G	A	Pts	PIM
								—	—	—	—	—
								—	—	—	—	—
1985–86	Fort Saskatchewan Traders	AJHL	29	12	23	35	24	—	—	—	—	—
1986–87	Northern Michigan University	WCHA	30	4	4	8	35	—	—	—	—	—
1987–88	Northern Michigan University	WCHA	34	7	23	30	26	—	—	—	—	—
1988–89	Northern Michigan University	WCHA	28	7	13	20	16	—	—	—	—	—
1989–90	Northern Michigan University	WCHA	8	2	5	7	8	—	—	—	—	—
1990–91	Northern Michigan University	WCHA	47	20	43	63	36	—	—	—	—	—
1991–92	Cape Breton Oilers	AHL	66	6	21	27	95	5	0	3	3	6
1992–93	Canada	Intl	18	3	7	10	10	—	—	—	—	—
1992–93	Edmonton Oilers	NHL	27	5	4	9	24	—	—	—	—	—
1992–93	Cape Breton Oilers	AHL	4	1	1	2	4	16	4	17	21	12
1993–94	Edmonton Oilers	NHL	15	0	4	4	14	—	—	—	—	—
1993–94	Cape Breton Oilers	AHL	25	6	17	23	19	—	—	—	—	—
1993–94	Quebec Nordiques	NHL	11	0	7	7	8	—	—	—	—	—
1993–94	Cornwall Aces	AHL	—	—	—	—	—	12	2	10	12	22
1994–95	Milwaukee Admirals	IHL	80	8	45	53	161	15	3	10	13	36
1995–96	Chicago Blackhawks	NHL	9	0	0	0	8	—	—	—	—	—
1995–96	Indianapolis Ice	IHL	73	15	42	57	85	5	1	3	4	8
1996–97	Indianapolis Ice	IHL	82	20	56	76	83	4	1	4	5	6
1997–98	Pittsburgh Penguins	NHL	71	3	15	18	46	6	1	0	1	8
1998–99	Pittsburgh Penguins	NHL	81	6	18	24	93	13	1	1	2	6
1999–2000	Pittsburgh Penguins	NHL	61	3	8	11	69	—	—	—	—	—
1999–2000	Calgary Flames	NHL	12	1	1	2	21	—	—	—	—	—
2000–01	Calgary Flames	NHL	33	1	4	5	16	—	—	—	—	—
AHL totals			95	13	39	52	118	33	6	30	36	40
NHL totals			320	19	61	80	299	19	2	1	3	14
IHL totals			235	43	143	186	329	24	5	17	22	50

=== International ===
Year	Team	Event	GP	G	A	Pts	PIM
1994	Canada	OG	8	2	2	4	8

Awards and achievements
Preceded by Dave Shields	WCHA Student-Athlete of the Year; 1990–91	Succeeded by Geoff Sarjeant
