= Mark Beaufait =

American ice hockey player (born 1970)

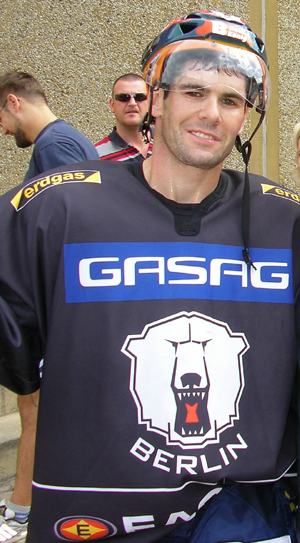
- Born: May 13, 1970 (age 56) Royal Oak, Michigan, U.S.
- Height: 5 ft 9 in (175 cm)
- Weight: 170 lb (77 kg; 12 st 2 lb)
- Position: Right wing
- Shot: Right
- Played for: Eisbären Berlin; San Jose Sharks
- National team: United States
- NHL draft: 1991 NHL Supplemental Draft; San Jose Sharks
- Playing career: 1992–2009

Mark David Beaufait (born May 13, 1970) is an American former professional ice hockey player. He resides in Grand Rapids, Michigan. He played 5 games in the National Hockey League (NHL) with the San Jose Sharks during the 1992–93 season. The rest of his career, which lasted from 1992 to 2009, was spent mainly in the International Hockey League and in the Deutsche Eishockey Liga, where he won 4 championships with Eisbären Berlin. Internationally, he played for the American national team at the 1994 Winter Olympics.

== Playing career ==
As a youth, Beaufait played in the 1982 and 1983 Quebec International Pee-Wee Hockey Tournaments with the Detroit Compuware and Michigan Dynamos minor ice hockey teams.

Beaufait attended Northern Michigan University from 1988 to 1992, winning the 1991 NCAA championship, and then turned pro.

He played five games for the San Jose Sharks of the NHL during the 1992–93 season. He was a member of the 1994 US Olympic team.

After playing for the Kansas City Blades and the San Diego Gulls, he embarked on a six-year stint with fellow IHL side Orlando Solar Bears, winning the Turner Cup in 2001, while leading the team in scoring, followed by a single season with AHL's Houston Aeros (2001–02).

He spent the last seven years of his career playing for the Eisbären Berlin of the German DEL. Beaufait appeared in 400 DEL games for Berlin between 2002 and 2009, scoring 134 goals, while assisting on 249 more. He won four national championships with the Eisbären team, while leading the league in scoring in 2002–03. He retired on April 16, 2009. In January 2011, he had his jersey number 19 retired by the Eisbären Berlin organization.

== Coaching career ==
He coaches his son Cole, as the head coach of Little Caesars Peewee AAA Team in Grand Rapids and was named full-time assistant coach of East Kentwood High School in Kentwood, Michigan, prior to the 2010–11 season.

== Career statistics ==
=== Regular season and playoffs ===
			Regular season					Playoffs
Season	Team	League	GP	G	A	Pts	PIM	GP	G	A	Pts	PIM
1987–88	Redford Royals	NAHL	—	—	—	—	—	—	—	—	—	—
1988–89	Northern Michigan University	CCHA	11	2	1	3	2	—	—	—	—	—
1989–90	Northern Michigan University	CCHA	34	10	14	24	12	—	—	—	—	—
1990–91	Northern Michigan University	CCHA	47	19	30	49	18	—	—	—	—	—
1991–92	Northern Michigan University	CCHA	41	31	50	81	47	—	—	—	—	—
1992–93	Kansas City Blades	IHL	66	19	40	59	22	9	1	1	2	8
1992–93	San Jose Sharks	NHL	5	1	0	1	0	—	—	—	—	—
1993–94	Kansas City Blades	IHL	21	12	9	21	18	—	—	—	—	—
1993–94	United States National Team	Intl	51	22	29	51	36	—	—	—	—	—
1994–95	San Diego Gulls	IHL	68	24	39	63	22	5	2	2	4	2
1995–96	Orlando Solar Bears	IHL	77	30	79	109	87	22	9	19	28	22
1996–97	Orlando Solar Bears	IHL	80	26	65	91	63	10	5	8	13	18
1997–98	Orlando Solar Bears	IHL	76	24	61	85	56	17	6	16	22	10
1998–99	Orlando Solar Bears	IHL	71	28	43	71	38	15	2	12	14	14
1999–00	Orlando Solar Bears	IHL	78	28	50	78	87	6	2	0	2	4
2000–01	Orlando Solar Bears	IHL	54	23	42	65	34	9	1	9	10	2
2001–02	Houston Aeros	AHL	63	14	37	51	36	12	5	4	9	4
2002–03	Eisbären Berlin	DEL	50	22	32	54	74	9	2	5	7	2
2003–04	Eisbären Berlin	DEL	45	15	24	39	51	11	5	8	13	10
2004–05	Eisbären Berlin	DEL	47	13	27	40	46	12	7	8	15	12
2005–06	Eisbären Berlin	DEL	50	14	30	44	36	11	4	7	11	10
2006–07	Eisbären Berlin	DEL	51	14	40	54	48	3	0	0	0	0
2007–08	Eisbären Berlin	DEL	39	15	30	45	44	9	3	5	8	10
NHL totals			5	1	0	1	0	—	—	—	—	—
IHL totals			591	214	428	642	427	93	28	67	95	80
DEL totals			282	93	183	276	299	55	21	33	54	44

=== International ===
Year	Team	Event	GP	G	A	Pts	PIM
1994	United States	OLY	8	1	4	5	2
Senior totals			8	1	4	5	2

== Awards and honors ==
Award	Year
WCHA All-Tournament Team	1991
