= Bill Pye (ice hockey) =

American ice hockey player

- Born: April 9, 1969 (age 57) Canton, Michigan, USA
- Height: 5 ft 10 in (178 cm)
- Weight: 177 lb (80 kg; 12 st 9 lb)
- Position: Goaltender
- Caught: Right
- Played for: Northern Michigan; Erie Panthers; Fort Wayne Komets; New Haven Nighthawks; Rochester Americans; South Carolina Stingrays; Saginaw Wheels; Columbus Chill; Waco Wizards; Odessa Jackalopes; Fort Worth Brahmas
- NHL draft: 107th, 1989; Buffalo Sabres
- Playing career: 1987–2000

William Pye is an American ice hockey coach and former goaltender who was an All-American for Northern Michigan and helped the team win its first National Championship in 1991.

== Career ==
Pye arrived in Marquette in the fall of 1987 and served as a backup to Mike Jeffrey in his freshman season. He took over the starting role at the start of his sophomore season and provided an immediate boost in goal. NMU went from 6th to 2nd in the WCHA and Pye led the Wildcats to their first WCHA Championship, capturing MVP honors. Northern Michigan wasn't able to make it out of the first round of the NCAA Tournament but the Buffalo Sabres had seen enough to select Pye in the 6th round of NHL Draft.

Pye had a rocky year as a junior, seeing his goals against average swell by more than a goal per game. The team managed a middling season and lost two overtime games in the conference tournament to finish in 4th place. In Pye's senior season, however, everything turned up roses. Northern Michigan won its first WCHA regular season title and Pye finished in the top 10 in the nation. He led the country with 32 wins and was named an All-American. In the postseason he shut down some of the strongest offenses in the country, enabling NMU to win their second WCHA title and became the only player to earn two WCHA tournament MVP's. Northern Michigan received a bye into the quarterfinal round of the NCAA Tournament and Pye proved solid in net while the offense ran over their opponents. NMU made its second championship appearance that year and the final game turned out to be one for the ages. Pye allowed three goals in the first but became a bulwark in the middle frame while the Wildcats scored five goals to take a commanding lead. Boston University, peppered with future NHL stars like Tony Amonte and Shawn McEachern, roared back with a 4-goal third and the two teams ended regulation with a 7–7 tie. The match became just the second championship game in history to need multiple overtime sessions and ended when Darryl Plandowski got the Wildcats the win in the third 10-minute extra frame.

After graduating, Pye began his professional career in the Sabres' minor league system. The closest Pye got to playing in the NHL was as an emergency call-up on two occasions. In November 1992, Dominik Hašek was suffering from a groin injury and Pye sat on the bench in game against the Ottawa Senators. He was replaced the following day by Clint Malarchuk. Almost two months later both Darren Puppa and Dominik Hašek were injured and Pye was recalled to serve as a backup for Tom Draper. He remained with the Sabres for a week but didn't play in any of the games. Pye was never able to find his form in the pro game and was progressively demoted until landing in the WPHL in the mid-90's. Pye had three 20-win seasons over a 4-year span and decided to call it quits in 2000. Upon his retirement as a player, Pye founded the "Billy Pye Goaltending Academy" and continued to operate the business in the Dallas–Fort Worth area.

While operating his business, Pye served as the goaltending coach for a few local junior teams, including the Wichita Falls Wildcats. He was inducted into the Northern Michigan Athletic Hall of Fame in 2007.

== Statistics ==
=== Regular season and playoffs ===
			Regular season									Playoffs
Season	Team	League	GP	W	L	T	MIN	GA	SO	GAA	SV%	GP	W	L	MIN	GA	SO	GAA	SV%
1985–86	St. Clair Shores Falcons	NAHL	23	13	7	2	1315	89	0	4.06	.847	—	—	—	—	—	—	—	—
1986–87	Detroit Falcons	NAHL	20	13	4	2	1084	60	0	3.32	—	—	—	—	—	—	—	—	—
1987–88	Northern Michigan	WCHA	13	3	7	0	654	49	0	4.49	.872	—	—	—	—	—	—	—	—
1988–89	Northern Michigan	WCHA	43	26	15	2	2533	133	1	3.15	.905	—	—	—	—	—	—	—	—
1989–90	Northern Michigan	WCHA	36	20	14	1	2035	149	1	4.39	.860	—	—	—	—	—	—	—	—
1990–91	Northern Michigan	WCHA	39	32	3	4	2300	109	4	2.84	.886	—	—	—	—	—	—	—	—
1991–92	Fort Wayne Komets	IHL	8	5	2	1	451	29	0	3.86	—	—	—	—	—	—	—	—	—
1991–92	New Haven Nighthawks	AHL	4	0	3	1	200	19	0	5.70	.806	—	—	—	—	—	—	—	—
1991–92	Rochester Americans	AHL	8	1	4	0	332	15	0	2.71	.893	1	—	—	—	—	—	2.00	.933
1991–92	Erie Panthers	ECHL	5	5	0	0	310	22	0	4.26	.859	4	—	—	—	—	—	—	—
1992–93	Rochester Americans	AHL	26	9	14	2	1427	107	0	4.50	.865	—	—	—	—	—	—	—	—
1993–94	Rochester Americans	AHL	19	7	7	2	980	70	0	4.29	.868	—	—	—	—	—	—	—	—
1993–94	South Carolina Stingrays	ECHL	28	15	10	2	1578	95	1	3.61	.895	3	—	—	—	—	—	—	—
1994–95	Saginaw Wheels	CoHL	13	5	7	0	663	51	0	4.83	.836	—	—	—	—	—	—	—	—
1995–96	Columbus Chill	ECHL	25	12	5	1	1227	92	0	4.50	.855	—	—	—	—	—	—	—	—
1996–97	Waco Wizards	WPHL	46	22	21	2	2620	159	0	3.64	.885	—	—	—	—	—	—	—	—
1997–98	Waco Wizards	WPHL	15	2	11	2	860	69	0	4.81	.857	—	—	—	—	—	—	—	—
1997–98	Odessa Jackalopes	WPHL	42	20	18	3	2348	175	1	4.47	.891	—	—	—	—	—	—	—	—
1998–99	Odessa Jackalopes	WPHL	45	20	22	2	2549	133	2	3.13	.898	3	—	—	—	—	—	2.70	.924
1999–00	Odessa Jackalopes	WPHL	20	5	11	2	1069	82	0	4.60	.875	—	—	—	—	—	—	—	—
1999–00	Fort Worth Brahmas	WPHL	28	7	18	2	1625	115	1	4.25	.886	—	—	—	—	—	—	—	—
NAHL totals			43	26	11	4	2399	149	0	3.73	—	—	—	—	—	—	—	—	—
NCAA totals			131	81	39	7	7522	440	6	3.51	.884	—	—	—	—	—	—	—	—
AHL totals			57	17	28	5	2939	211	0	4.31	.865	1	—	—	—	—	—	2.00	.933
ECHL totals			58	32	15	3	3115	209	1	4.03	.877	7	—	—	—	—	—	—	—
WPHL totals			196	76	101	13	11071	733	4	3.97	.886	3	—	—	—	—	—	2.70	.924

== Awards and honors ==
Award	Year
WCHA All-Tournament Team	1989
All-WCHA First Team	1990–91
AHCA West Second-Team All-American	1990–91
All-NCAA All-Tournament Team	1991

Awards and achievements
Preceded by Dean Anderson; Steve Rohlik	WCHA Most Valuable Player in Tournament; 1989; 1991	Succeeded by Steve Rohlik; Corwin Saurdiff
