= Joe Frederick =

American ice hockey player (born 1969)

- Born: June 8, 1969 (age 56) Madison, Wisconsin, U.S.
- Height: 6 ft 0 in (183 cm)
- Weight: 200 lb (91 kg; 14 st 4 lb)
- Position: Right wing
- Shot: Right
- Played for: Adirondack Red Wings; Orlando Solar Bears; Phoenix Roadrunners; Chicago Wolves; Milwaukee Admirals; Manitoba Moose; Grand Rapids Griffins; HIFK; Utah Grizzlies; Cleveland Lumberjacks
- National team: United States
- NHL draft: 242nd overall, 1989; Detroit Red Wings
- Playing career: 1993–2005

Joe Frederick (born August 18, 1969) is an American former professional ice hockey right winger.

== Career ==
Frederick was drafted 242nd overall by the Detroit Red Wings in the 1989 NHL entry draft and played for the Adirondack Red Wings of the American Hockey League between 1993 and 1995. Though he never managed to play in the National Hockey League, he did play in the 1995 World Championship for the United States.

He later played in the International Hockey League for the next five seasons, playing for the Orlando Solar Bears, Phoenix Roadrunners, Chicago Wolves, Milwaukee Admirals, Manitoba Moose, Grand Rapids Griffins, Utah Grizzlies and Cleveland Lumberjacks. He also played seven games for HIFK in Finland's SM-liiga during the 1998–99 season.

Frederick also played five games for the Minnesota Blue Ox in Roller Hockey International during the 1995 season.

== Career statistics ==
			Regular season					Playoffs
Season	Team	League	GP	G	A	Pts	PIM	GP	G	A	Pts	PIM
1990–91	Northern Michigan University	NCAA	40	9	11	20	77	—	—	—	—	—
1991–92	Northern Michigan University	NCAA	38	26	8	34	122	—	—	—	—	—
1992–93	Northern Michigan University	NCAA	29	28	20	48	100	—	—	—	—	—
1992–93	Adirondack Red Wings	AHL	5	0	1	1	2	8	0	0	0	6
1993–94	Adirondack Red Wings	AHL	68	28	30	58	130	12	11	4	15	22
1994–95	Adirondack Red Wings	AHL	71	27	28	55	124	4	0	0	0	10
1995–96	Orlando Solar Bears	IHL	63	22	14	36	194	23	6	2	8	36
1996–97	Orlando Solar Bears	IHL	48	16	9	25	82	—	—	—	—	—
1996–97	Phoenix Roadrunners	IHL	9	2	3	5	10	—	—	—	—	—
1996–97	Chicago Wolves	IHL	8	1	1	2	14	1	1	0	1	0
1997–98	Milwaukee Admirals	IHL	25	14	9	23	53	—	—	—	—	—
1997–98	Manitoba Moose	IHL	45	20	13	33	55	2	0	0	0	0
1998–99	Grand Rapids Griffins	IHL	45	23	18	41	98	—	—	—	—	—
1998–99	HIFK	Liiga	7	1	1	2	6	—	—	—	—	—
1999–00	Utah Grizzlies	IHL	31	8	7	15	36	—	—	—	—	—
1999–00	Cleveland Lumberjacks	IHL	9	3	2	5	6	9	3	3	6	6
2000–01	Anchorage Aces	WCHL	32	10	19	29	36	—	—	—	—	—
2000–01	Fresno Falcons	WCHL	7	2	3	5	4	5	3	3	6	4
2001–02	Fresno Falcons	WCHL	65	31	21	52	95	15	7	7	14	10
2002–03	Fresno Falcons	WCHL	9	3	8	11	6	—	—	—	—	—
2004–05	Las Vegas Wranglers	ECHL	2	0	1	1	0	—	—	—	—	—
AHL totals			144	55	59	114	256	24	11	4	15	38
