= Jim Hiller =

Canadian ice hockey player and coach

- Born: May 13, 1969 (age 57) Port Alberni, British Columbia, Canada
- Height: 6 ft 0 in (183 cm)
- Weight: 190 lb (86 kg; 13 st 8 lb)
- Position: Left wing
- Shot: Right
- Played for: Los Angeles Kings; Detroit Red Wings; New York Rangers; Star Bulls Rosenheim; Berlin Capitals; HC Milano
- Current NHL coach: Toronto Maple Leafs
- Coached for: Los Angeles Kings
- NHL draft: 207th overall, 1989; Los Angeles Kings
- Playing career: 1992–2002
- Coaching career: 2002–present

James Andrew Hiller (born May 13, 1969) is a Canadian professional ice hockey coach and former player who is the head coach for the Toronto Maple Leafs of the National Hockey League (NHL). Hiller played 63 games in the NHL with the Los Angeles Kings, Detroit Red Wings, and New York Rangers, while spending time in the American Hockey League (AHL) and International Hockey League (IHL). He finished his career playing overseas in the Deutsche Eishockey Liga in Germany and Italian Serie A. Upon retiring, Hiller began a coaching career in the junior leagues, and later served as head coach of the Kings in the NHL.

== Playing career ==
Hiller was born in Port Alberni, British Columbia. After playing Junior A hockey for the Melville Millionaires, major junior in the Western Hockey League (WHL) with the Prince Albert Raiders, Hiller was drafted in the tenth round, 207th overall, by the Los Angeles Kings in the 1989 NHL entry draft. Upon being drafted, Hiller began a three-year college ice hockey career with Northern Michigan University. NMU won the 1991 NCAA title in Hiller's sophomore year. Following an 86-point campaign with Northern Michigan in a 41-game 1991–92 season, his third with the university, he turned pro with the Los Angeles Kings.

During his rookie season, he was traded to the Detroit Red Wings and completed his rookie season in 1992–93 with 20 points in 61 games split between the two teams. The next season, in 1993–94, Hiller joined the New York Rangers, but played only two games in the NHL, spending his tenure with the organization in the minor leagues with Binghamton Rangers of the American Hockey League (AHL) and Atlanta Knights of the International Hockey League (IHL).

After one season with the Canadian national team, Hiller went overseas to play in the Deutsche Eishockey Liga with the Star Bulls Rosenheim in 1996–97. He finished second in league scoring in his third and final campaign with the club in 1998–99 with 67 points in 52 games, two points behind Martin Jiranek of the Nürnberg Ice Tigers. In 1999–2000, Hiller began a two-season stint with the Berlin Capitals, after which he spent one final season with HC Milano of the Italian Serie A before retiring.

== Coaching career ==
=== Minor leagues ===
After retiring in 2002 from his playing career, Hiller immediately began his coaching career as an assistant coach with the Tri-City Americans of the WHL for two seasons. In 2004–05, he was named head coach of the Alberni Valley Bulldogs of the British Columbia Hockey League (BCHL), where he coached two seasons and posted records of 32–20–6–2 and 43–12–3–2 respectively. The next season, he was selected to coach the expansion Chilliwack Bruins back in the WHL. He coached the franchise to playoff berths in their first two seasons, but after missing the post-season in his third year with the club, he was fired.

Later in the 2009 off-season, he was named head coach of the Tri-City Americans. In 2010 the Americans reached the WHL championship series but lost to the Calgary Hitmen. Hiller received WHL and CHL coach of the year honors for the 2011–12 season.

=== NHL ===
On July 30, 2014, Hiller was hired by the Detroit Red Wings as an assistant coach under Mike Babcock, overseeing the power play.

After one season in Detroit, Hiller followed Mike Babcock to the Toronto Maple Leafs, where he also had responsibility for the power play.

On June 19, 2019, the New York Islanders announced Hiller would be joining their coaching staff as an assistant under Barry Trotz. One month after the Islanders fired Trotz and replaced him with Lane Lambert, Hiller was also relieved of his duties on June 9, 2022.

On July 19, 2022, Hiller was hired as an assistant coach for the Los Angeles Kings under Todd McLellan. On February 2, 2024, Hiller was named interim head coach following the firing of McLellan. Under Hiller, the Kings made the playoffs and lost to the Edmonton Oilers in five games. Following the 2023–24 season on May 22, Hiller was named the Los Angeles Kings' head coach. During the 2025 Stanley Cup playoffs in game 3 of the first-round series against the Oilers with the Kings having a 2–0 series lead, Hiller made a coach's challenge call on Evander Kane's game-tying goal that was an unsuccessful challenge and that was criticized by the media. The Oilers ended up winning the game 7–4, and ultimately went on to win the next three games, eliminating the Kings for the fourth consecutive season. Despite being eliminated against the Oilers in the 2025 playoffs, new general manager Ken Holland announced that Hiller would remain as head coach of the Kings for the 2025–26 season.

On March 1, 2026, the Kings fired Hiller after the team compiled a 24–21–14 record, including a 2–5–1 record in Hiller's final eight games. Associate coach D. J. Smith was named interim head coach.

On June 17, 2026, Hiller was named head coach of the Toronto Maple Leafs, replacing Craig Berube.

== Career statistics ==
			Regular season					Playoffs
Season	Team	League	GP	G	A	Pts	PIM	GP	G	A	Pts	PIM
1986–87	Prince Albert Raiders	WHL	3	0	0	0	12	—	—	—	—	—
1987–88	Melville Millionaires	SJHL	60	38	49	87	190	—	—	—	—	—
1988–89	Melville Millionaires	SJHL	29	24	37	61	49	—	—	—	—	—
1989–90	Northern Michigan University	NCAA	39	23	33	56	52	—	—	—	—	—
1990–91	Northern Michigan University	NCAA	43	22	41	63	59	—	—	—	—	—
1991–92	Northern Michigan University	NCAA	41	31	55	86	119	—	—	—	—	—
1992–93	Los Angeles Kings	NHL	40	6	6	12	90	—	—	—	—	—
1992–93	Detroit Red Wings	NHL	21	2	6	8	19	2	0	0	0	4
1992–93	Phoenix Roadrunners	IHL	3	0	2	2	2	—	—	—	—	—
1993–94	New York Rangers	NHL	2	0	0	0	7	—	—	—	—	—
1993–94	Binghamton Rangers	AHL	67	27	34	61	61	—	—	—	—	—
1994–95	Binghamton Rangers	AHL	49	15	13	28	44	—	—	—	—	—
1994–95	Atlanta Knights	IHL	17	5	10	15	28	5	0	3	3	8
1996–97	Star Bulls Rosenheim	DEL	47	22	27	49	187	3	0	1	1	45
1997–98	Star Bulls Rosenheim	DEL	42	8	19	27	83	—	—	—	—	—
1998–99	Star Bulls Rosenheim	DEL	52	23	44	67	65	—	—	—	—	—
1999–2000	Berlin Capitals	DEL	48	16	16	32	90	6	3	1	4	38
2000–01	Berlin Capitals	DEL	48	11	23	34	87	5	2	2	4	14
2001–02	Milano Vipers	Italy	38	22	19	41	83	9	4	10	14	0
NHL totals			63	8	12	20	116	2	0	0	0	4

== Head coaching record ==
Team	Year	Regular season						Postseason			
Team	Year	G	W	L	OTL	Pts	Finish	W	L	Win %	Result
LAK	2023–24	34	21	12	1	(43)	3rd in Pacific	1	4	.200	Lost in first round (EDM)
LAK	2024–25	82	48	25	9	105	2nd in Pacific	2	4	.333	Lost in first round (EDM)
LAK	2025–26	59	24	21	14	(62)	(fired)	—	—	—	—
Total		175	93	58	24			3	8	.273	2 playoff appearances

== Awards and honours ==
Award	Year
All-WCHA Second Team	1991–92
AHCA West Second-Team All-American	1991–92
Brian Kilrea Coach of the Year Award	2011–12

Sporting positions
Preceded by Todd McLellan	Head coach of the Los Angeles Kings; 2024–2026	Succeeded by D. J. Smith (interim)
Preceded by Craig Berube	Head coach of the Toronto Maple Leafs; 2026–present	Incumbent
