= Lakeview Arena =

Arena in Marquette, Michigan

Coordinates: 46.557257°N 87.386832°W

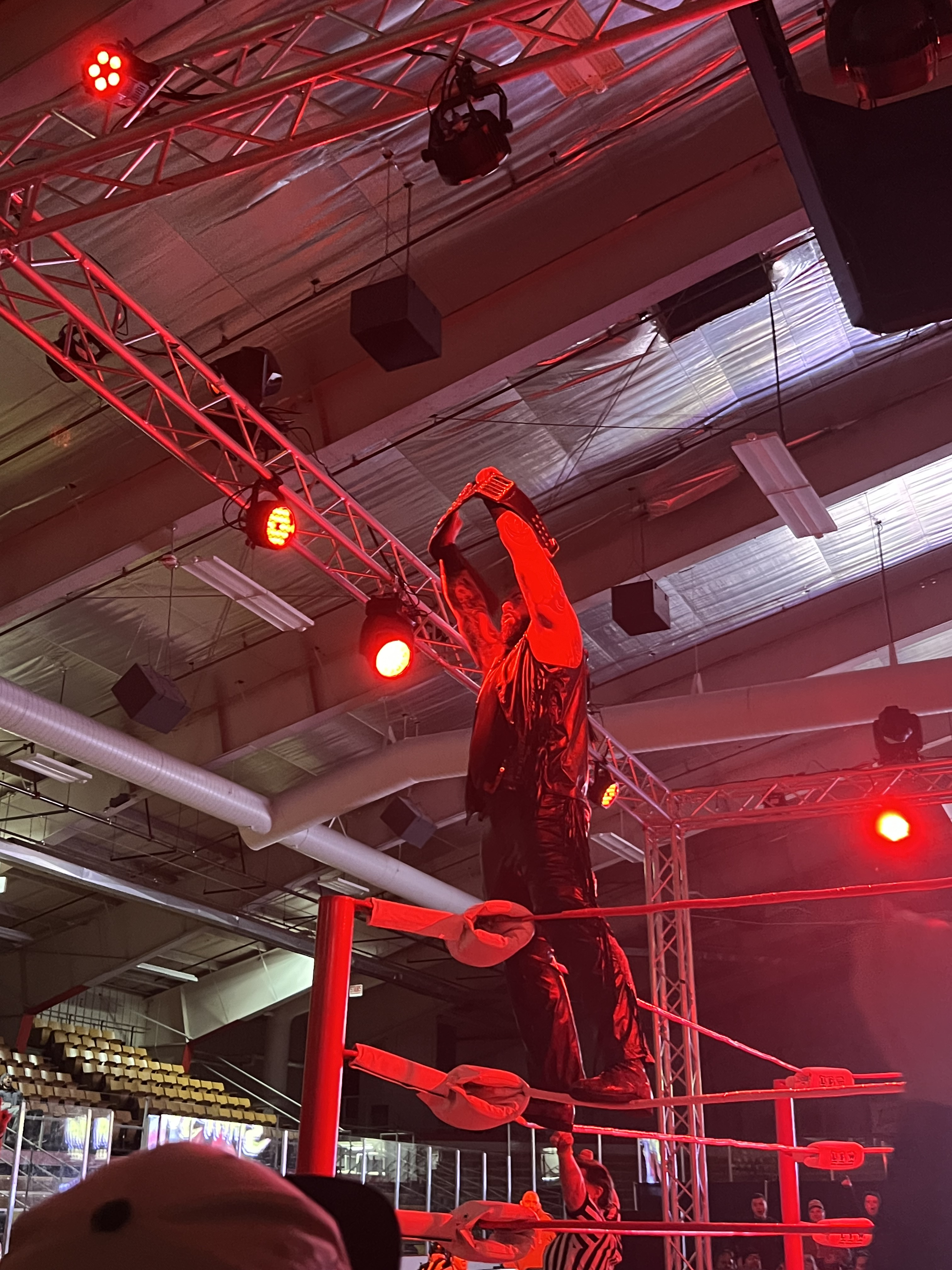
- Interactive map of Lakeview Arena
- Location: 401 East Fair Avenue; Marquette, Michigan
- Owner: City of Marquette
- Operator: Parks and Recreation Department
- Capacity: 3,100 (hockey)
- Surface: 200 by 85 feet (61 m × 26 m) (hockey)

Construction
- Opened: 1974

Tenants
- Marquette Iron Rangers (USHL) (1974–1976); Northern Michigan Wildcats (NCAA) (1976–1999); Marquette Rangers (NAHL) (2006–2010)

Lakeview Arena is a 3,100-seat multi-purpose arena, located in Marquette, Michigan. It opened in 1974, during the Marquette Iron Rangers hockey season. The team had previously played in the historic Palestra, a building that had moved from Laurium, Michigan in 1921 and was torn down shortly after Lakeview opened. From 1976 to 1999, it was the home of Northern Michigan University's hockey program, and it was there, during the 1990–91 season, that the Wildcats posted a perfect home record on their way to the 1991 NCAA Division I Men's Ice Hockey Tournament.

KISS performed at the arena during their Animalize Tour on March 20, 1985, during their Crazy Nights Tour on January 5, 1988, and during their Hot in The Shade Tour on October 4, 1990. Today the building is used for local hockey programs, primarily Marquette Junior Hockey, as well as other events and conventions in the city. It was also home to the Marquette Rangers of the NAHL between 2006 and 2010, before they moved to Flint. It became home to the newly revived Marquette Iron Rangers in the Great Lakes Hockey League's 2015-16 season. After that season, the team folded and was replaced by the Marquette Mutineers. Also, the AWA had two wrestling events there, one on October 9, 1983 headlined by Hulk Hogan, and another on May 20, 1984. On January 15, 1987, Jim Crockett Promotions had a NWA event with Ric Flair main eventing. Currently UPW Pro Wrestling holds their yearly Marquettemania event at Lakeview.

Lakeview is owned by the city and operated by the Parks and Recreation Department.

Lakeview won the Kraft Hockeyville USA contest on April 30, 2016. The arena received $150,000 in upgrades, and hosted the Buffalo Sabres and Carolina Hurricanes on October 4, 2016 in a preseason NHL contest. Buffalo won the game 2-0.
