= 1981 NCAA Division I men's ice hockey tournament =

- Teams: 8
- Finals site: Duluth Arena, Duluth, Minnesota
- Champions: Wisconsin Badgers (3rd title)
- Runner-up: Minnesota Golden Gophers (8th title game)
- Semifinalists: Michigan Tech Huskies (10th Frozen Four); Northern Michigan Wildcats (2nd Frozen Four)
- Winning coach: Bob Johnson (3rd title)
- MOP: Marc Behrend (Wisconsin)

The 1981 NCAA Division I men's ice hockey tournament was the culmination of the 1980–81 NCAA Division I men's ice hockey season, the 34th such tournament in NCAA history. It was held between March 19 and 27, 1981, and concluded with Wisconsin defeating Minnesota 6-3. All Quarterfinals matchups were held at home team venues while all succeeding games were played at the Duluth Arena in Duluth, Minnesota.

1981 was the first year that the tournament guaranteed 8 teams to be selected for the championship as opposed the policy put in place in 1977 that gave the selection committee the ability to choose up to 4 additional teams at its discretion (two was the maximum the committee ever choose).

== Qualifying teams ==
The NCAA permitted 8 teams to qualify for the tournament, four from each region (East and West). From the east the ECAC tournament champion and the regular season champions from the two ECAC divisions that did not contain the ECAC champion received automatic bids into the tournament with a fourth at-large bid going to one eastern team. From the west the two WCHA tournament co-champions and the CCHA tournament champion received automatic bids with a fourth at-large bid going to one western team.

East							West						
Seed	School	Conference	Record	Berth type	Appearance	Last bid	Seed	School	Conference	Record	Berth type	Appearance	Last bid
1	Clarkson	ECAC Hockey	26–6–3	Division champion	7th	1970	1	Minnesota	WCHA	30–11–0	Tournament co-champion	10th	1980
2	Providence	ECAC Hockey	17–13–1	Tournament champion	3rd	1978	2	Northern Michigan	CCHA	26–11–3	Tournament champion	2nd	1980
3	Cornell	ECAC Hockey	18–10–1	Division champion	8th	1980	3	Michigan Tech	WCHA	26–13–1	Tournament co-champion	10th	1976
4	Colgate	ECAC Hockey	21–10–2	At-large bid	1st	Never	4	Wisconsin	WCHA	24–14–0	At-large bid	6th	1978

== Format ==
The tournament featured three rounds of play. The two odd-number ranked teams from one region were placed into a bracket with the two even-number ranked teams of the other region. The teams were then seeded according to their ranking. In the Quarterfinals the first and fourth seeds and the second and third seeds played two-game aggregate series to determine which school advanced to the Semifinals. Beginning with the Semifinals all games were played at the Duluth Arena and all series became Single-game eliminations. The winning teams in the semifinals advanced to the National Championship Game with the losers playing in a Third Place game.

== Tournament bracket ==
Quarterfinals; March 19–21
E1	Clarkson	2	6	8
W4	Wisconsin	3	6	9
W2	Northern Michigan	7	3	10
E3	Cornell	3	4	7
W1	Minnesota	9	5	14
E4	Colgate	4	4	8
E2	Providence	3	5	8
W3	Michigan Tech	7	6	13

Semifinals; March 25–26
W4	Wisconsin	5
W2	Northern Michigan	1
W1	Minnesota	7
W3	Michigan Tech	2

National championship March 27
W4	Wisconsin	6
W1	Minnesota	3
Third-place game
W2	Northern Michigan	2
W3	Michigan Tech	5

Note: * denotes overtime period(s)

=== Quarterfinals ===
==== (E1) Clarkson vs. (W4) Wisconsin ====
March 20	Clarkson	2 – 3	Wisconsin	Walker Arena	Recap
(Boprey, Small) Colin Patterson - 14:12		First period	00:34 - Dan Gorowsky (Newberry); 12:40 - Peter Johnson (McFarlane)
No scoring		Second period	09:09 - GW - Lexi Doner (Mullen, Driver)
(Cleaver, Haramis) Steve Cruickshank - 03:19		Third period	No scoring
(23 saves / 25 shots) Don Sylvestri		Goalie stats	Marc Behrend (36 saves / 38 shots)

March 21	Clarkson	6 – 6	Wisconsin	Walker Arena	Recap
(Small, J. Armstrong) Bryan Cleaver - PP - 02:00 (Audycki, MacDougall) Steve Cruickshank - 04:19		First period	18:58 - PP - Theran Welsh (Johnson, McKenzie)
(B. Armstrong, Haramis) Steve Cruickshank - 03:49 (Patterson, J. Armstrong) Bryan Cleaver - PP - 10:14		Second period	00:44 - PP - Peter Johnson (Welsh, McKenzie); 09:13 - John Newberry (Mullen, McFarlane); 18:32 - Theran Welsh (S. Lecy, Lebler)
(Small, Cleaver) Colin Patterson - PP - 11:50 (J. Armstrong) Steve MacDougall - 14:36		Third period	05:51 - Ted Pearson (Gorowsky, Newberry); 09:05 - Scott Lecy (Lebler, T. Lecy)
(34 saves / 40 shots) Don Sylvestri		Goalie stats	Marc Behrend (28 saves / 34 shots)

Wisconsin won series 9–8

==== (E2) Providence vs. (W3) Michigan Tech ====
March 20	Providence	3 – 7	Michigan Tech	Schneider Arena	Recap
(Gouin, Toppazzini) Mike Bolstad - PP - 09:08		First period	00:32 - Jeff Wylie (Stiles, Terry); 07:10 - Jim Bissett (Pearson, Sparrow); 16:29 - Rick Boehm (Watters)
No scoring		Second period	01:17 - GW - Mike Lauen (Loconsole, Zuke); 01:38 - Per-Åke Johansson (Boehm, Schwartz); 04:16 - Tim Watters (Boehm, Gerry)
(Orlando, S. Kleinendorst) John Sullivan - 05:00 (Taylor) John Sullivan - SH - 19:50		Third period	06:06 - Nick Schwartz (Boehm, Stiles)
(17 saves / 23 shots) Mario Proulx (14 saves / 15 shots) Scott Fiske		Goalie stats	Frank Krieber (24 saves / 27 shots)

March 21	Providence	5 – 6	Michigan Tech	Schneider Arena	Recap
(S. Kleinendorst, Toppazzini) Kurt Kleinendorst - PP - 03:54		First period	02:08 - Per-Åke Johansson (Schwartz, Palkovich); 09:07 - SH - Nick Schwartz (Palkovich)
(Orlando) Jim Colucci - PP - 08:49 (Colucci, Orlando) Kurt Kleinendorst - PP - 09:41 (S. Kleinendorst, Hogberg) Dan Miele - 16:07		Second period	01:05 - Bill Terry (Watters)
(Orlando, S. Kleinendorst) Hugh Toppazzini - PP - 03:29		Third period	07:58 - Al Mickalich (Terry, Wylie); 10:01 - Tony Stiles (Scott, Bissett); 14:33 - PP GW - Ron Zuke (Lauen)
(28 saves / 34 shots) Scott Fiske		Goalie stats	Frank Krieber (26 saves / 31 shots)

Michigan Tech won series 13–8

==== (W1) Minnesota vs. (E4) Colgate ====
March 20	Minnesota	9 – 4	Colgate	Williams Arena	Recap
(Doshan) Kevin Hartzell - SH - 08:49 (Hartzell, Meadows) Bryan Erickson - 09:25 (A. Broten, Meadows) Tom Rothstein - 15:42 (Knoke, Butters) Aaron Broten - 16:02		First period	11:31 - PP - Jim Wallace (Houle, Iselmoe)
(Knoke, A. Broten) Steve Ulseth - GW - 02:46 (Hartzell) Mike Knoke - PP - 11:01		Second period	18:13 - Mark Morris (Gertsakis)
(A. Broten, Knoke) Bryan Erickson - PP - 11:51 (Erickson, Hartzell) Steve Ulseth - PP - 16:04 (Hartzell) Mike Knoke - PP - 19:09		Third period	01:11 - PP - Dan Fridgen (Wallace, Lapansée); 03:35 - PP - Steve Smith (Houle, Fridgen)
(33 saves / 37 shots) Paul Butters		Goalie stats	Terry McSweeney (41 saves / 50 shots)

March 21	Minnesota	5 – 4	Colgate	Williams Arena	Recap
No scoring		First period	12:19 - Denis Lapensée (Renaud, Ens)
(Ulseth, Erickson) Aaron Broten - PP - 07:24 (Knoke, Hartzell) Steve Ulseth - PP - 14:32 (Dillon, Erickson) Aaron Broten - 16:30		Second period	No scoring
(Bjugstad, Teal) Brad Dorsham - 00:32 (Ulseth) Aaron Broten - PP GW - 08:36		Third period	01:21 - Denis Lapensée (Renaud, Sterling); 05:46 - Ken Iselmoe (Wallace, Morris); 12:08 - Steve Smith (Walsh)
(24 saves / 28 shots) James Jetland		Goalie stats	Guy Lemonde (29 saves / 34 shots)

Minnesota won series 14–8

==== (W2) Northern Michigan vs. (E3) Cornell ====
March 20	Northern Michigan	7 – 3	Cornell	Lakeview Arena	Recap
(Verigin, Kyle) Jeff Pyle - 08:06 (Tascoff, Ponath) Bruce Martin - PP - 11:26		First period	09:59 - PP - Roy Kerling (Roeszler)
(Hanson, Martin) Steve Bozek - 14:38		Second period	08:10 - Joe Gallant (Baikie, Berk)
(Mogush, Fisher) Dave Kanigan - GW - 03:52 (Hanson, Martin) Steve Bozek - 08:15 (Kyle, Ikkala) Jeff Pyle - 13:29 (Pyle, Ikkala) Walt Kyle - 13:48		Third period	11:35 - PP - Greg Reid (Roeszler, Dervin)
(31 saves / 34 shots) Jeff Poeschl		Goalie stats	Darren Eliot (21 saves / 25 shots); Brian Hayward (11 saves / 14 shots)

March 21	Northern Michigan	3 – 4	Cornell	Lakeview Arena	Recap
(Bozek, Schafhauser) Bruce Martin - 16:33		First period	08:18 - Dan Duffy (Roeszler, Strawman)
(Bozek, Fisher) Keith Hanson - 15:27 (Pyle, Tascoff Steve Bozek - PP - 19:16		Second period	13:13 - Jeff Baikie (Gallant, Kerling)
No scoring		Third period	09:35 - Doug Berk (Olds, Baikie); 14:18 - PP GW - John Olds (Gallant, Baikie)
(31 saves / 35 shots) Jeff Poeschl		Goalie stats	Brian Hayward (54 saves / 57 shots)

Northern Michigan won series 10–7

=== Semifinal ===
==== (W1) Minnesota vs. (W3) Michigan Tech ====
March 26	Minnesota	7 – 2	Michigan Tech	Duluth Arena	Recap
(unassisted) Jeff Teal - 07:23 (A. Broten, N. Broten) Steve Ulseth - PP - 08:42 (Knoke) Aaron Broten - GW - 17:25 (A. Broten, Erickson) Neil Broten - 19:59		First period	17:18 - Bill Terry (Wylie, Mickalich)
(Teal, Bergloff) Kevin Hartzell - 00:51 (B. Larson, Hartzell) Jeff Teal - PP - 10:25		Second period	15:12 - PP - Mike Lauen (Locensole, Hjelmqvist)
(Knoke, N. Broten) Aaron Broten - PP - 09:51		Third period	No scoring
(23 saves / 25 shots) Paul Butters		Goalie stats	Frank Krieber (34 saves / 41 shots)

==== (W2) Northern Michigan vs. (W4) Wisconsin ====
March 27	Northern Michigan	1 – 5	Wisconsin	Duluth Arena	Recap
No scoring		First period	No scoring
No scoring		Second period	03:00 - PP - Ed Lebler (Newberry, Ethier); 19:58 - SH GW - John Johannson (unassisted)
(Martin) Steve Bozek - PP - 08:49		Third period	02:45 - Bruce Driver (unassisted); 17:12 - Scott Lecy (Ethier); 17:36 - Ted Pearson (Newberry, Vincent)
(34 saves / 39 shots) Jeff Poeschl		Goalie stats	Marc Behrend (25 saves / 26 shots)

=== Third-place game ===
==== (W2) Northern Michigan vs. (W3) Michigan Tech ====
March 28	Northern Michigan	2 – 5	Michigan Tech	Duluth Arena	Recap
(Ikkala, Pyle) Dave Smith - PP - 05:35		First period	No scoring
No scoring		Second period	14:15 - Ron Zuke (Wylie, Stiles); 14:35 - Ron Zuke (Lauen)
(Bozek, Hanson) Bruce Martin - 06:09		Third period	00:23 - GW - Jeff Wylie (Mickalich, Terry); 03:26 - PP - Rick Boehm (Watters); 12:57 - Tim Watters (unassisted)
(36 saves / 41 shots) Scott Stoltzner		Goalie stats	Frank Krieber (26 saves / 28 shots)

=== National Championship ===
==== (W1) Minnesota vs. (W4) Wisconsin ====
March 28	Minnesota	3 – 6	Wisconsin	Duluth Arena

Scoring summary
Period	Team	Goal	Assist(s)	Time	Score
1st	WIS	Dan Gorowsky	Newberry and Vincent	9:24	1–0 WIS
1st	WIS	John Newberry – PP	Vincent and Welsh	14:49	2–0 WIS
1st	WIS	Ed Lebler	Ethier	19:49	3–0 WIS
2nd	WIS	Ted Pearson – GW	Lebler and Newberry	29:23	4–0 WIS
2nd	MIN	Butsy Erickson	Ulseth and Knoke	32:37	4–1 WIS
2nd	WIS	John Newberry – PP	S. Lecy and Vincent	34:27	5–1 WIS
3rd	MIN	Mike Knoke – PP	Jensen and A. Broten	40:10	5–2 WIS
3rd	MIN	Butsy Erickson – PP	Hartzell and A. Broten	56:09	5–3 WIS
3rd	WIS	Ed Lebler – EN	Driver	58:40	6–3 WIS
Penalty summary
Period	Team	Player	Penalty	Time	PIM
1st	WIS	John Newberry	Roughing	0:28	2:00
1st	MIN	Dave Jensen	Roughing	0:28	2:00
1st	WIS	Bruce Driver	Hooking	4:14	2:00
1st	WIS	Pat Ethier	Interference	9:35	2:00
1st	WIS	Brian Mullen	Charging	10:11	2:00
1st	MIN	Neal Broten	Cross-checking	10:11	2:00
1st	WIS	Jay McFarlane	Charging	11:58	2:00
1st	MIN	Paul Butters	Interference	14:15	2:00
2nd	WIS	Theran Welsh	Holding	25:48	2:00
2nd	WIS	Pete Johnson	Hooking	30:31	2:00
2nd	MIN	Scott Bjugstad	High-sticking	32:51	2:00
2nd	MIN	Mike Meadows	Roughing	35:28	2:00
2nd	MIN	Bob Bergloff	Roughing	36:00	2:00
2nd	WIS	Pat Ethier	Elbowing	38:15	2:00
3rd	WIS	Ted Pearson	Hooking	45:21	2:00
3rd	WIS	Todd Lecy	Interference	55:06	2:00

Shots by period
Team	1	2	3	T
Wisconsin	11	14	17	42
Minnesota	8	10	15	33

Goaltenders
Team	Name	Saves	Goals against	Time on ice
WIS	Marc Behrend	30	3	
MIN	Paul Butters	33	5	
MIN	Jim Jetland	3	0	

== All-Tournament Team ==
- G: Marc Behrend* (Wisconsin)
- D: Mike Knoke (Minnesota)
- D: Tim Watters (Michigan Tech)
- F: Steve Bozek (Northern Michigan)
- F: Aaron Broten (Minnesota)
- F: John Newberry (Wisconsin)

* Most Outstanding Player(s)
