= Wisconsin Badgers men's ice hockey statistical leaders =

The Wisconsin Badgers men's ice hockey statistical leaders are individual statistical leaders of the Wisconsin Badgers men's ice hockey program in various categories, including goals, assists, points, and saves. Within those areas, the lists identify single-game, single-season, and career leaders. The Badgers represent the University of Wisconsin–Madison in the NCAA's Big Ten Conference.

Wisconsin began competing in intercollegiate ice hockey in 1921. These lists are updated through the end of the 2021–22 season.

== Goals ==
Career
| Rk | Player | Goals | Seasons |
|---|---|---|---|
| 1 | Mark Johnson | 125 | 1976–77 1977–78 1978–79 |
| 2 | Bert DeHate | 108 | 1966–67 1967–68 1968–69 1969–70 |
| 3 | Tony Granato | 100 | 1983–84 1984–85 1985–86 1986–87 |
| 4 | Mike Eaves | 94 | 1974–75 1975–76 1976–77 1977–78 |
| 5 | Jason Zent | 92 | 1990–91 1991–92 1992–93 1993–94 |
| 6 | Paul Ranheim | 88 | 1984–85 1985–86 1986–87 1987–88 |
| 7 | Gary Shuchuk | 85 | 1986–87 1987–88 1988–89 1989–90 |
| 8 | Gary Winchester | 83 | 1970–71 1971–72 1972–73 1973–74 |
| | Les Grauer | 83 | 1975–76 1976–77 1977–78 1978–79 |
| | Scott Lecy | 83 | 1977–78 1978–79 1979–80 1980–81 |

Season
| Rk | Player | Goals | Season |
|---|---|---|---|
| 1 | Mark Johnson | 48 | 1977–78 |
| 2 | Bert DeHate | 47 | 1967–68 |
| 3 | Mark Johnson | 41 | 1978–79 |
| | Gary Shuchuk | 41 | 1989–90 |
| 5 | Chris Tancill | 39 | 1989–90 |
| 6 | John Newberry | 38 | 1981–82 |
| | Paul Houck | 38 | 1982–83 |
| 8 | Bert DeHate | 36 | 1968–69 |
| | Mark Johnson | 36 | 1976–77 |
| | Paul Ranheim | 36 | 1987–88 |

Single Game
| Rk | Player | Goals | Season | Opponent |
|---|---|---|---|---|
| 1 | Bert DeHate | 5 | 1966–67 | Ohio University |
| | Mike Meeker | 5 | 1977–78 | Michigan Tech |
| | Mark Johnson | 5 | 1977–78 | Michigan Tech |

== Assists ==
Career
| Rk | Player | Assists | Seasons |
|---|---|---|---|
| 1 | Theran Welsh | 194 | 1977–78 1978–79 1979–80 1980–81 |
| 2 | Mike Eaves | 173 | 1974–75 1975–76 1976–77 1977–78 |
| 3 | Mark Johnson | 131 | 1976–77 1977–78 1978–79 |
| | Ron Vincent | 131 | 1978–79 1979–80 1980–81 1981–82 |
| 5 | Scott Lecy | 127 | 1977–78 1978–79 1979–80 1980–81 |
| 6 | Craig Norwich | 126 | 1974–75 1975–76 1976–77 |
| 7 | Mark Zengerle | 125 | 2010–11 2011–12 2012–13 2013–14 |
| 8 | Tony Granato | 120 | 1983–84 1984–85 1985–86 1986–87 |
| 9 | Andrew Shier | 115 | 1990–91 1991–92 1992–93 1993–94 |
| 10 | Doug MacDonald | 114 | 1988–89 1989–90 1990–91 1991–92 |

Season
| Rk | Player | Assists | Season |
|---|---|---|---|
| 1 | Craig Norwich | 65 | 1976–77 |
| 2 | Mike Eaves | 58 | 1977–78 |
| 3 | Theran Welsh | 54 | 1978–79 |
| 4 | Mike Eaves | 53 | 1976–77 |
| 5 | Theran Welsh | 51 | 1979–80 |
| 6 | Tim Thomas | 50 | 1984–85 |
| 7 | Mark Johnson | 49 | 1978–79 |
| | Scott Lecy | 49 | 1980–81 |
| 9 | Theran Welsh | 45 | 1977–78 |
| | Ron Vincent | 45 | 1980–81 |
| | Tony Granato | 45 | 1986–87 |
| | Andrew Shier | 45 | 1993–94 |

Single Game
| Rk | Player | Assists | Season | Opponent |
|---|---|---|---|---|
| 1 | Mark Fitzgerald | 6 | 1967–68 | Lake Forest |

== Points ==
Career
| Rk | Player | Points | Seasons |
|---|---|---|---|
| 1 | Mike Eaves | 267 | 1974–75 1975–76 1976–77 1977–78 |
| 2 | Mark Johnson | 256 | 1976–77 1977–78 1978–79 |
| 3 | Theran Welsh | 228 | 1977–78 1978–79 1979–80 1980–81 |
| 4 | Tony Granato | 220 | 1983–84 1984–85 1985–86 1986–87 |
| 5 | Scott Lecy | 210 | 1977–78 1978–79 1979–80 1980–81 |
| 6 | Ron Vincent | 206 | 1978–79 1979–80 1980–81 1981–82 |
| 7 | Doug MacDonald | 189 | 1988–89 1989–90 1990–91 1991–92 |
| 8 | Bert DeHate | 188 | 1966–67 1967–68 1968–69 1969–70 |
| 9 | Les Grauer | 181 | 1975–76 1976–77 1977–78 1978–79 |
| 10 | Paul Houck | 177 | 1981–82 1982–83 1983–84 1984–85 |
| | Paul Ranheim | 177 | 1984–85 1985–86 1986–87 1987–88 |

Season
| Rk | Player | Points | Season |
|---|---|---|---|
| 1 | Mark Johnson | 90 | 1978–79 |
| 2 | Mike Eaves | 89 | 1977–78 |
| 3 | Mark Johnson | 86 | 1977–78 |
| 4 | Craig Norwich | 83 | 1976–77 |
| 5 | Mike Eaves | 81 | 1976–77 |
| 6 | Mark Johnson | 80 | 1976–77 |
| | Gary Shuchuk | 80 | 1989–90 |
| 8 | Bert DeHate | 77 | 1967–68 |
| 9 | Scott Lecy | 75 | 1980–81 |
| 10 | Tony Granato | 73 | 1986–87 |

Single Game
| Rk | Player | Points | Season | Opponent |
|---|---|---|---|---|
| 1 | Tom French | 8 | 1963–64 | Illinois Club |
| | Ron Leszczynski | 8 | 1963–64 | Illinois Club |
| | Bert DeHate | 8 | 1966–67 | Ohio University |

== Saves ==
Career
| Rk | Player | Saves | Seasons |
|---|---|---|---|
| 1 | Graham Melanson | 3,850 | 1997–98 1998–99 1999–00 2000–01 |
| 2 | Kirk Daubenspeck | 3,517 | 1993–94 1994–95 1995–96 1996–97 |
| 3 | Duane Derksen | 3,222 | 1988–89 1989–90 1990–91 1991–92 |
| 4 | Joel Rumpel | 3,176 | 2011–12 2012–13 2013–14 2014–15 |
| 5 | Dean Anderson | 3,024 | 1984–85 1985–86 1986–87 1987–88 |
| 6 | Bernd Brückler | 2,981 | 2001–02 2002–03 2003–04 2004–05 |

Season
| Rk | Player | Saves | Season |
|---|---|---|---|
| 1 | Dean Anderson | 1,305 | 1987–88 |
| 2 | Graham Melanson | 1,254 | 2000–01 |
| 3 | Kirk Daubenspeck | 1,224 | 1994–95 |
| 4 | Kirk Daubenspeck | 1,159 | 1995–96 |
| 5 | Mike Richter | 1,148 | 1986–87 |
| 6 | Marc Behrend | 1,143 | 1981–82 |
| 7 | Terry Kleisinger | 1,126 | 1981–82 |
| 8 | Graham Melanson | 1,077 | 1999–00 |
| 9 | Curtis Joseph | 1,061 | 1988–89 |
| | Duane Derksen | 1,061 | 1989–90 |

Single Game
| Rk | Player | Saves | Season | Opponent |
|---|---|---|---|---|
| 1 | Kirk Daubenspeck | 75 | 1996–97 | CC |
| 2 | Jim Makey | 62 | 1972–73 | MSU |
| | Kirk Daubenspeck | 62 | 1996–97 | UMD |
