= List of Wisconsin Badgers men's ice hockey seasons =

This is a season-by-season list of records compiled by Wisconsin in men's ice hockey.

The University of Wisconsin–Madison has won six NCAA Championships in its history, the most recent coming in 2006 (as of 2026).

== Season-by-season results ==
Note: GP = Games played, W = Wins, L = Losses, T = Ties

NCAA D-I Champions	NCAA Frozen Four	Conference regular season champions	Conference Playoff Champions

Season	Conference	Regular Season (Note: Code explanation; GP—Games Played, W—Wins, L—Losses, T—Tied games, OTW—Overtime Wins, OTL—Overtime Loses, 3/SW—Win in 3 on 3 overtime or shootout, Pts—Points*)														Conference Tournament Results	National Tournament Results
Season	Conference	Conference									Overall					Conference Tournament Results	National Tournament Results
Season	Conference	GP	W	L	T	OTW	OTL	3/SW	Pts*	Finish	GP	W	L	T	%	Conference Tournament Results	National Tournament Results
A. C. Viner (1921–1923)
1921–22	Independent	–	–	–	–	–	–	–	–	–	8	0	8	0	.000		
1922–23	Independent	–	–	–	–	–	–	–	–	–	11	3	5	3	.409		
Robert Blodgett (1923–1924)
1923–24	Independent	–	–	–	–	–	–	–	–	–	13	3	9	1	.269		
Kay Iverson (1924–1926)
1924–25	Independent	–	–	–	–	–	–	–	–	–	9	1	7	1	.167		
1925–26	Independent	–	–	–	–	–	–	–	–	–	15	8	3	4	.667		
Rube Brandow (1926–1927)
1926–27	Independent	–	–	–	–	–	–	–	–	–	10	1	9	0	.100		
John Farquhar (1927–1930)
1927–28	Independent	–	–	–	–	–	–	–	–	–	16	5	7	4	.438		
1928–29	Independent	–	–	–	–	–	–	–	–	–	20	11	7	2	.600		
1929–30	Independent	–	–	–	–	–	–	–	–	–	12	5	6	1	.458		
Spike Carlson (1930–1931)
1930–31	Independent	–	–	–	–	–	–	–	–	–	11	4	6	1	.409		
Art Thomasen (1931–1935)
1931–32	Independent	–	–	–	–	–	–	–	–	–	4	1	3	0	.250		
1932–33	Independent	–	–	–	–	–	–	–	–	–	9	0	9	0	.000		
1933–34	Independent	–	–	–	–	–	–	–	–	–	8	3	4	1	.438		
1934–35	Independent	–	–	–	–	–	–	–	–	–	11	5	6	0	.455		
Program Suspended
John Riley (1963–1966)
1963–64	Independent	–	–	–	–	–	–	–	–	–	16	8	5	3	.594		
University Division
1964–65	Independent	–	–	–	–	–	–	–	–	–	23	14	9	0	.609		
1965–66	Independent	–	–	–	–	–	–	–	–	–	21	12	9	0	.571		
Bob Johnson (1966–1975)
1966–67	Independent	–	–	–	–	–	–	–	–	–	26	16	10	0	.615		
1967–68	Independent	–	–	–	–	–	–	–	–	–	31	21	10	0	.677		
1968–69	Big Ten	8	3	5	0	–	–	–	.375	4th	34	22	10	2	.676		
1969–70	Big Ten	12	6	6	0	–	–	–	12	2nd	34	23	11	0	.676	Won WCHA regional semifinal, 2–1 (Michigan); Won WCHA Regional Final, 3–2 (Denver)	Lost Semifinal, 1–2 (Cornell); Won Third-place game, 6–5 (Michigan Tech)
1969–70	WCHA	22	12	10	0	–	–	–	.545	4th	34	23	11	0	.676	Won WCHA regional semifinal, 2–1 (Michigan); Won WCHA Regional Final, 3–2 (Denver)	Lost Semifinal, 1–2 (Cornell); Won Third-place game, 6–5 (Michigan Tech)
1970–71	Big Ten	12	7	5	0	–	–	–	.583	2nd	34	20	13	1	.603	Lost WCHA regional semifinal, 3–4 (Minnesota)	
1970–71	WCHA	22	13	9	0	–	–	–	.591	3rd	34	20	13	1	.603	Lost WCHA regional semifinal, 3–4 (Minnesota)	
1971–72	Big Ten	10	6	4	0	–	–	–	12	1st	38	27	10	1	.724	Won WCHA first round series, 10–3 (Michigan); Won WCHA second round series, 6–2 (North Dakota)	Lost Semifinal, 1–4 (Boston University); Won Third-place game, 5–2 (Denver)
1971–72	WCHA	28	20	8	0	–	–	–	44	2nd	38	27	10	1	.724	Won WCHA first round series, 10–3 (Michigan); Won WCHA second round series, 6–2 (North Dakota)	Lost Semifinal, 1–4 (Boston University); Won Third-place game, 5–2 (Denver)
1972–73	Big Ten	12	8	3	1	–	–	–	17	T–1st	40	29	9	2	.750	Won WCHA first round series, 14–10 (Minnesota); Won WCHA second round series, 8–7 (Notre Dame)	Won Semifinal, 6–5 (OT) (Cornell); Won Championship, 4–2 (Denver)
1972–73	WCHA	28	18	9	1	–	–	–	47	T–3rd	40	29	9	2	.750	Won WCHA first round series, 14–10 (Minnesota); Won WCHA second round series, 8–7 (Notre Dame)	Won Semifinal, 6–5 (OT) (Cornell); Won Championship, 4–2 (Denver)
Division I
1973–74	Big Ten	12	5	4	3	–	–	–	13	T–1st	36	18	13	5	.569	Lost WCHA first round series, 5–7 (Michigan State)	
1973–74	WCHA	28	12	11	5	–	–	–	29	5th	36	18	13	5	.569	Lost WCHA first round series, 5–7 (Michigan State)	
1974–75	Big Ten	12	6	6	0	–	–	–	12	T–2nd	38	24	12	2	.658	Lost WCHA first round series, 9–11 (Michigan State)	
1974–75	WCHA	32	19	11	2	–	–	–	40	4th	38	24	12	2	.658	Lost WCHA first round series, 9–11 (Michigan State)	
Bill Rothwell (1975–1976)
1975–76	Big Ten	12	3	9	0	–	–	–	6	4th	38	12	24	2	.342	Lost WCHA first round series, 8–12 (Michigan State)	
1975–76	WCHA	32	11	19	2	–	–	–	24	T–7th	38	12	24	2	.342	Lost WCHA first round series, 8–12 (Michigan State)	
Bob Johnson (1976–1982)
1976–77	Big Ten	12	9	3	0	–	–	–	18	1st	45	37	7	1	.833	Won WCHA first round series, 6–2 (Colorado College); Won WCHA Semifinal series, 17–8 (Minnesota); Won WCHA Championship series, 9–4 (Michigan)	Won Semifinal, 4–3 (OT) (New Hampshire); Won Championship, 6–5 (OT) (Michigan)
1976–77	WCHA	32	26	5	1	–	–	–	53	1st	45	37	7	1	.833	Won WCHA first round series, 6–2 (Colorado College); Won WCHA Semifinal series, 17–8 (Minnesota); Won WCHA Championship series, 9–4 (Michigan)	Won Semifinal, 4–3 (OT) (New Hampshire); Won Championship, 6–5 (OT) (Michigan)
1977–78	Big Ten	12	8	3	1	–	–	–	17	1st	43	28	12	3	.686	Won WCHA first round series, 14–6 (Minnesota–Duluth); Won WCHA second round series, 11–7 (Michigan Tech)	Lost Semifinal, 2–5 (Boston University); Lost Third-place game, 3–4 (Bowling Green)
1977–78	WCHA	32	21	9	2	–	–	–	44	2nd	43	28	12	3	.686	Won WCHA first round series, 14–6 (Minnesota–Duluth); Won WCHA second round series, 11–7 (Michigan Tech)	Lost Semifinal, 2–5 (Boston University); Lost Third-place game, 3–4 (Bowling Green)
1978–79	Big Ten	12	8	4	0	–	–	–	16	2nd	41	25	13	3	.646	Won WCHA first round series, 16–10 (Notre Dame); Lost WCHA second round series, 8–4 (North Dakota)	
1978–79	WCHA	32	19	11	2	–	–	–	40	T–3rd	41	25	13	3	.646	Won WCHA first round series, 16–10 (Notre Dame); Lost WCHA second round series, 8–4 (North Dakota)	
1979–80	Big Ten	12	4	8	0	–	–	–	8	4th	36	15	20	1	.431		
1979–80	WCHA	30	12	18	0	–	–	–	.400	9th	36	15	20	1	.431		
1980–81	Big Ten	10	5	5	0	–	–	–	.500	2nd	42	27	14	1	.655	Lost WCHA first round series, 12–13 (Colorado College)	Won Quarterfinal series, 9–8 (Clarkson); Won Semifinal, 5–1 (Northern Michigan); Won Championship, 6–3 (Minnesota)
1980–81	WCHA	28	17	11	0	–	–	–	34	T–2nd	42	27	14	1	.655	Lost WCHA first round series, 12–13 (Colorado College)	Won Quarterfinal series, 9–8 (Clarkson); Won Semifinal, 5–1 (Northern Michigan); Won Championship, 6–3 (Minnesota)
1981–82	WCHA	26	18	7	1	–	–	–	37	2nd	47	35	11	1	.755	Won Semifinal series, 9–6 (Minnesota); Won Championship series, 12–1 (North Dakota)	Won Quarterfinal series, 10–4 (Harvard); Won Semifinal, 5–0 (New Hampshire); Lost Championship, 2–5 (North Dakota)
Jeff Sauer (1982–2002)
1982–83	WCHA	26	15	9	2	–	–	–	32	3rd	47	33	10	4	.745	Won First round series, 8–4 (Colorado College); Won Semifinal series, 7–6 (North Dakota); Won Championship series, 8–3 (Minnesota)	Won Quarterfinal series, 13–3 (St. Lawrence); Won Semifinal, 2–0 (Providence); Won Championship, 6–2 (Harvard)
1983–84	WCHA	26	11	14	1	–	–	–	.442	4th	39	21	17	1	.551	Won First round series, 13–8 (Denver); Lost Semifinal series, 3–15 (Minnesota)	
1984–85	WCHA	34	20	14	0	–	–	–	40	3rd	42	25	17	0	.595	Won First round series, 9–4 (Colorado College); Lost Semifinal series, 7–14 (Minnesota)	
1985–86	WCHA	34	23	11	0	–	–	–	46	3rd	42	27	15	0	.643	Won First round series, 12–7 (North Dakota); Lost Semifinal series, 4–11 (Minnesota)	
1986–87	WCHA	35	17	17	1	–	–	–	35	T–3rd	42	23	18	1	.560	Won First round series, 10–4 (Northern Michigan); Lost Semifinal series, 6–9 (Minnesota)	
1987–88	WCHA	35	22	12	1	–	–	–	45	2nd	45	30	13	2	.689	Won First round series, 2–0 (Northern Michigan); Won Semifinal, 2–1 (North Dakota); Won Championship, 3–2 (Minnesota)	Won First round series, 11–5 (Lowell); Lost Quarterfinal series, 4–10 (St. Lawrence)
1988–89	WCHA	35	17	13	5	–	–	–	39	T–3rd	46	25	16	5	.598	Won First round series, 2–0 (Michigan Tech); Lost Semifinal, 2–4 (Northern Michigan); Won Third-place game, 4–3 (Minnesota)	Won First round series, 2–0 (St. Lawrence); Lost Quarterfinal series, 0–2 (Minnesota)
1989–90	WCHA	28	19	8	1	–	–	–	39	1st	46	36	9	1	.793	Won First round series, 2–0 (Michigan Tech); Won Semifinal, 4–3 (OT) (Northern Michigan); Won Championship, 7–1 (Minnesota)	Won Quarterfinal series, 2–0 (Maine); Won Semifinal, 2–1 (Boston College); Won Championship, 7–3 (Colgate)
1990–91	WCHA	32	19	11	2	–	–	–	40	3rd	44	26	15	3	.625	Won First round series, 2–0 (Minnesota–Duluth); Lost Semifinal, 2–3 (Minnesota)	Lost First round series, 0–2 (Clarkson)
1991–92	WCHA	32	19	11	2	–	–	–	40	2nd	43	27	14	2	.651	Won First round series, 2–1 (St. Cloud State); Lost Semifinal, 3–6 (Northern Michigan); Won Third-place game, 5–3 (Colorado College)	Won Regional Quarterfinal, 4–2 (New Hampshire) †; Won regional semifinal, 5–2 (St. Lawrence) †; Won National semifinal, 4–2 (Michigan) †; Lost Championship, 3–5 (Lake Superior State) †
1992–93	WCHA	32	18	11	3	–	–	–	39	T–2nd	42	24	15	3	.607	Won First round series, 2–0 (Colorado College); Lost Semifinal, 2–3 (OT) (Minnesota); Lost Third-place game, 5–7 (Minnesota–Duluth)	Won Regional Quarterfinal, 3–1 (Miami); Lost regional semifinal, 3–4 (OT) (Michigan)
1993–94	WCHA	32	19	12	1	–	–	–	39	3rd	42	26	15	1	.631	Won First round series, 2–0 (North Dakota); Lost Semifinal, 2–3 (OT) (St. Cloud State); Won Third-place game, 8–3 (Michigan Tech)	Won Regional Quarterfinal, 6–3 (Western Michigan); Lost regional semifinal, 1–4 (Boston University)
1994–95	WCHA	32	16	11	5	–	–	–	37	4th	43	24	15	4	.605	Won First round series, 2–1 (Northern Michigan); Won Semifinal, 5–4 (Denver); Won Championship, 4–3 (OT) (Colorado College)	Won Regional Quarterfinal, 5–3 (Michigan State); Lost regional semifinal, 3–4 (Michigan)
1995–96	WCHA	32	14	15	3	–	–	–	31	6th	40	17	20	3	.463	Won First round series, 2–0 (North Dakota); Lost Semifinal, 3–4 (OT) (Minnesota); Lost Third-place game, 4–6 (Colorado College)	
1996–97	WCHA	32	15	15	2	–	–	–	32	7th	38	15	21	2	.421	Lost First round series, 0–2 (Colorado College)	
1997–98	WCHA	28	17	10	1	–	–	–	35	2nd	41	26	14	1	.646	Won First round series, 2–0 (Alaska–Anchorage); Won Semifinal, 5–2 (Colorado College); Won Championship, 3–2 (North Dakota)	Lost Regional Quarterfinal, 4–7 (New Hampshire)
1998–99	WCHA	28	13	12	3	–	–	–	29	4th	38	15	19	4	.447	Lost First round series, 0–2 (St. Cloud State)	
1999–00	WCHA	28	23	5	0	–	–	–	46	1st	41	31	9	1	.768	Won First round series, 2–0 (Michigan Tech); Won Semifinal, 5–3 (Minnesota); Lost Championship, 3–5 (North Dakota)	Lost Regional semifinal, 1–4 (Boston College)
2000–01	WCHA	28	14	10	4	–	–	–	32	5th	41	22	15	4	.585	Won First round series, 2–0 (Denver); Lost Quarterfinal, 0–3 (Colorado College)	Won Regional Quarterfinal, 4–1 (Providence); Lost regional semifinal, 1–5 (Michigan State)
2001–02	WCHA	28	12	13	3	–	–	–	27	5th	39	16	19	4	.462	Won First round series, 2–0 (Minnesota State–Mankato); Lost Quarterfinal, 2–3 (OT) (Colorado College)	
Mike Eaves (2002–2016)
2002–03	WCHA	28	7	14	4	–	–	–	18	8th	40	13	23	4	.375	Lost First round series, 0–2 (Minnesota State–Mankato)	
2003–04	WCHA	28	14	7	7	–	–	–	35	3rd	43	22	13	8	.605	Lost First round series, 1–2 (Alaska–Anchorage)	Won Regional semifinal, 1–0 (OT) (Ohio State); Lost Regional Final, 1–2 (OT) (Maine)
2004–05	WCHA	28	16	9	3	–	–	–	35	T–3rd	41	23	14	4	.610	Won First round series, 2–1 (Alaska–Anchorage); Lost Quarterfinal, 1–3 (North Dakota)	Lost Regional semifinal, 1–4 (Michigan)
2005–06	WCHA	28	17	8	3	–	–	–	37	T–2nd	43	30	10	3	.733	Won First round series, 2–0 (Michigan Tech); Lost Semifinal, 7–8 (OT) (North Dakota); Won Third-place game, 4–0 (Minnesota)	Won Regional semifinal, 4–0 (Bemidji State); Won Regional Final, 1–0 (3OT) (Cornell); Won National semifinal, 5–2 (Maine); Won National Championship, 2–1 (Boston College)
2006–07	WCHA	28	12	13	3	–	–	–	27	T–6th	41	19	18	4	.512	Won First round series, 2–0 (Denver); Won Quarterfinal, 4–0 (Michigan Tech); Lost Semifinal, 2–4 (Minnesota); Won Third-place game, 4–3 (OT) (St. Cloud State)	
2007–08	WCHA	28	11	12	5	–	–	–	27	6th	40	16	17	7	.488	Lost First round series, 0–2 (St. Cloud State)	Won Regional semifinal, 6–2 (Denver); Lost Regional Final, 2–3 (OT) (North Dakota)
2008–09	WCHA	28	14	11	3	–	–	–	31	T–3rd	40	20	16	4	.550	Won First round series, 2–0 (Minnesota State); Lost Semifinal, 2–4 (Denver); Won Third-place game, 4–1 (North Dakota)	
2009–10	WCHA	28	17	8	3	–	–	–	37	2nd	43	28	11	4	.698	Won First round series, 2–0 (Alaska–Anchorage); Lost Semifinal, 0–2 (St. Cloud State); Won Third-place game, 6–3 (Denver)	Won Regional semifinal, 3–2 (Vermont); Won Regional Final, 5–3 (St. Cloud State); Won National semifinal, 8–1 (RIT); Lost National Championship, 0–5 (Boston College)
2010–11	WCHA	28	12	13	3	–	–	–	27	7th	41	21	16	4	.561	Lost First round series, 1–2 (Colorado College)	
2011–12	WCHA	28	11	15	2	–	–	–	24	10th	37	17	18	2	.486	Lost First round series, 1–2 (Denver)	
2012–13	WCHA	28	13	8	7	–	–	–	33	T–4th	42	22	13	7	.607	Won First round series, 2–0 (Minnesota–Duluth); Won Quarterfinal, 7–2 (Minnesota State); Won Semifinal, 4–1 (St. Cloud State); Won Championship, 3–2 (Colorado College)	Lost Regional semifinal, 1–6 (Massachusetts–Lowell)
2013–14	Big Ten	20	13	6	1	–	–	0	40	2nd	37	24	11	2	.676	Won Semifinal, 2–1 (Penn State); Won Championship, 5–4 (OT) (Ohio State)	Lost Regional semifinal, 2–5 (North Dakota)
2014–15	Big Ten	20	2	15	3	–	–	2	11	6th	35	4	26	5	.186	Lost Quarterfinal, 1–5 (Michigan)	
2015–16	Big Ten	20	3	13	4	–	–	2	15	6th	35	8	19	8	.343	Lost Quarterfinal, 2–5 (Penn State)	
Tony Granato (2016–2023)
2016–17	Big Ten	20	12	8	0	–	–	0	36	2nd	36	20	15	1	.569	Won Semifinal, 2–1 (Ohio State); Lost Championship, 1–2 (2OT) (Penn State)	
2017–18	Big Ten	24	8	13	3	–	–	1	28	6th	37	14	19	4	.432	Lost Quarterfinal series, 0–2 (Michigan)	
2018–19	Big Ten	24	9	10	5	–	–	2	34	T–5th	37	14	18	5	.446	Lost Quarterfinal series, 1–2 (Penn State)	
2019–20	Big Ten	24	7	15	2	–	–	2	25	7th	36	14	20	2	.417	Lost Quarterfinal series, 0–2 (Ohio State)	
2020–21	Big Ten	24	16	6	1	1	1	0	.729	1st	31	20	10	1	.661	Won Semifinal, 4–3 (OT) (Penn State); Lost Championship, 4–6 (Minnesota)	Lost Regional semifinal, 3–6 (Bemidji State)
2021–22	Big Ten	24	6	17	1	1	1	0	.250	6th	37	10	24	3	.311	Lost Quarterfinal series, 1–2 (Notre Dame)	
2022–23	Big Ten	24	6	18	0	0	0	0	18	7th	36	13	23	0	.361	Lost Quarterfinal series, 0–2 (Michigan)	
Mike Hastings (2023–Present)
2023–24	Big Ten	24	16	7	1	2	2	1	50	2nd	40	26	12	2	.675	Lost Quarterfinal series, 1–2 (Ohio State)	Lost Regional semifinal, 2–3 (OT) (Quinnipiac)
2024–25	Big Ten	24	7	16	1	1	6	0	27	6th	37	13	21	3	.392	Lost Quarterfinal series, 1–2 (Ohio State)	
2025–26	Big Ten	24	14	10	0	3	0	0	39	4th	39	24	13	2	.641	Lost Quarterfinal, 1–7 (Ohio State)	Won Regional Semifinal, 5-1 (Dartmouth); Won Regional Final, 4-3 (OT) (Michigan State); Won National Semifinal, 2-1 (North Dakota); Lost National Championship, 1-2 (Denver)
Totals											GP	W	L	T	%	Championships	
Regular Season											2310	1233	903	174	.571	3 WCHA Championships, 6 Big Ten Championships	
Conference Post-season											178	106	67	5	.610	12 WCHA tournament championships, 1 Big Ten tournament championship	
NCAA Post-season											67	41	25	1	.619	28 NCAA Tournament appearances	
Regular Season and Post-season Record											2555	1380	995	180	.575	6 NCAA Division I National Championships	

† Wisconsin's participation in the 1992 NCAA Tournament was later vacated due to NCAA rules violations.
