= Ed Small =

Canadian ice hockey player

- Born: March 2, 1959 (age 67) Ottawa, Ontario, Canada
- Position: Defenseman
- Shot: Left
- Played for: Clarkson; Nova Scotia Voyageurs
- Playing career: 1977–1983

Edward Small (born March 2, 1959) is a Canadian retired ice hockey defenseman who was an All-American for Clarkson.

== Career ==
Small came to Clarkson University in the fall of 1977. In his first two seasons, under the leadership of Jerry York, the team played well but performed rather unspectacularly in the conference postseason. Small put up respectable numbers but was far down the depth chart and not much more than a stable defender. After York left for greener pastures, Clarkson alumnus Bill O'Flaherty began his tenure in 1979 and Small saw an immediate change. He more than tripled his point production from his sophomore to junior year and was named to the all-conference second team. More importantly, the team won its first playoff game in three years.

For his senior season, Small was named team co-captain with Bryan Cleaver and the Golden Knights went on a stellar run. Clarkson finished the season atop the ECAC Hockey standings and placed three players on the All-American team, including Small. Small was named as the ECAC Hockey Player of the Year and led the Golden Knights into the playoffs with a championship in their sights. Clarkson was derailed in the ECAC semifinal by Providence with a 3–4 overtime loss, however, because the NCAA tournament had been expanded to 8 teams that year, Clarkson received an at-large bid and made their first appearance in eleven years. The Golden Knights received the top eastern seed and faced Wisconsin in a two-game, total-goal series. The Badgers took the first game 2–3 and gave Clarkson plenty of opportunities to erase the deficit in game 2. Unfortunately, the Golden Knights couldn't pull away and the two ended with a 6–6 tie that left Clarkson down a goal for the series.

After graduation, Small continued his playing career with the Nova Scotia Voyageurs. He played two seasons with the Montreal Canadiens' top farm team but never distinguished himself enough to receive a callup and retired as a player in 1983. Small was later named to the 1980 ECAC All-Decade team.

== Statistics ==
=== Regular season and playoffs ===
			Regular Season					Playoffs
Season	Team	League	GP	G	A	Pts	PIM	GP	G	A	Pts	PIM
1976–77	Nepean Raiders	CJHL	49	15	36	51	66	—	—	—	—	—
1977–78	Clarkson	ECAC Hockey	30	5	10	15	42	—	—	—	—	—
1978–79	Clarkson	ECAC Hockey	28	2	9	11	57	—	—	—	—	—
1979–80	Clarkson	ECAC Hockey	33	9	28	37	57	—	—	—	—	—
1980–81	Clarkson	ECAC Hockey	37	11	29	40	26	—	—	—	—	—
1981–82	Nova Scotia Voyageurs	AHL	74	7	30	37	84	8	0	3	3	2
1982–83	Nova Scotia Voyageurs	AHL	73	3	20	23	35	4	0	0	0	0
NCAA totals			128	27	76	103	182	—	—	—	—	—
AHL totals			147	10	50	60	119	12	0	3	3	2

== Awards and honors ==
Award	Year
All-ECAC Hockey Second Team	1979–80
All-ECAC Hockey First Team	1980–81
AHCA East All-American	1980–81

Awards and achievements
Preceded by Craig Homola	ECAC Hockey Player of the Year; 1980–81	Succeeded by Steve Cruickshank
