= 1980–81 Wisconsin Badgers men's ice hockey season =

American college ice hockey season

National champion NCAA Tournament, champion
- Conference: 2nd Big Ten; T–2nd WCHA
- Home ice: Dane County Coliseum

Record
- Overall: 27–14–1 (17–11 / 5–5)
- Home: 16–6
- Road: 7–7
- Neutral: 4–1–1

Coaches and captains
- Head coach: Bob Johnson
- Assistant coaches: Grant Standbrook
- Captain: Jay McFarlane

The 1980–81 Wisconsin Badgers men's ice hockey team represented the University of Wisconsin–Madison in college ice hockey. In its fourteenth year under head coach Bob Johnson, the team compiled a 27–14–1 record (17–11 against Western Collegiate Hockey Association (WCHA) opponents) and outscored all opponents 218 to 155. The Badgers were the recipients of an at-large bid in the first year that the NCAA guaranteed 8 teams entry into the postseason tournament and in doing so became the first team to win a national championship because of the expanded format.

== Season ==
Wisconsin began the 1980–81 season fresh after compiling its first losing season since returning to NCAA play in 1963. With little expectation for the '81 campaign Bob Johnson's Badgers got off to a fast start, going 7-1 in the first month of the season before embarking on a .500 skid in early November. The Badgers would lose a game in every weekend series until after Christmas when they finally managed to take both games against a mediocre Yale squad, only to lose both games to Rensselaer the following week. Wisconsin was hampered by high-scoring freshman and future NHL-er Bruce Eakin leaving the program after only four games and heading to the WHL.

From January 1 onward, Wisconsin managed to just post a winning record, going 10-8 over that stretch but still finishing in a tie for second in conference standings on the strength of their early-season success. The Badgers won the tie-breaker over Michigan Tech and were seeded second in the WCHA Tournament. After winning their first game against Colorado College 8-2 it appeared Wisconsin was set for an appearance in second round until the Tigers roared back with an 11-4 win in the second game and upset a stunned Badger team 13-12 in the series.

Ordinarily that would have been the end of the Wisconsin's season but in the summer of 1980 the NCAA changed its tournament format. With the success of the CCHA and the increasing number of programs at the Division I level the NCAA tournament was expanded to 8 teams, 4 for eastern schools and 4 for western squads. As tournament co-champions Minnesota and Michigan Tech received automatic bids, as did CCHA champion Northern Michigan. That left one spot open for a western school. Due to the feeling at the time that the CCHA was a 'lesser' conference the 24-12-3 record of second place Ohio State was seen as inferior to anything the WCHA could offer and the Buckeyes were passed over. While the Badgers did lose in the first round Denver, who had finished only two points behind Wisconsin, had also lost their first round matchup and the team that had defeated them, Michigan, were soundly beaten by Michigan Tech in the Second round 9-2. With no team standing out from the rest the tournament committee settled on awarding the final spot to Wisconsin.

Wisconsin opened the 1981 Tournament in front a hostile crowd in Potsdam, NY as they faced the top eastern seed Clarkson. Miraculously the Badgers managed to take the first game 3-2 but, just as the WCHA tournament had been, the NCAA first round was a 2-game total-goal series and 1 score was a very slim margin to hold. The second game was a much more explosive affair with both teams notching six goals in regulation play. Because of a peculiarity with the series Wisconsin leading 9-8 after regulation didn't end the matchup and the two would play one overtime session to see if the 'winner' of the game could be determined. If Wisconsin scored the series would be over immediately, however, if Clarkson scored the game would continue because the series had been tied at 9-9 despite an overtime marker. Neither of those events came to pass and both teams failed to score in the overtime session, allowing the game to finish in a tie and the Badgers to progress to the Frozen Four.

In their first game at the Duluth Arena the Badgers faced Northern Michigan, the first time the two teams played one another. Both squads played a scoreless first period before Ed Lebler opened the scoring three minutes into the second. Two more Badgers scored before the Wildcats could get their first goal of the game but Marc Behrend made sure that was all they could earn, turning away their 25 other shots en route to a 5-1 win. In the final Wisconsin was set against #1 overall seed Minnesota who possessed the top offense in the nation boasting both the NCAA scoring champion Aaron Broten and the first Hobey Baker Award winner Neal Broten. The Golden Gophers had taken three out of four contests against the Badgers that season, out-pacing Johnson's team 27 goals to 14. None of that seemed to affect Wisconsin in the slightest as it was the Badgers who opened the scoring half way through the first period and never looked back. Wisconsin got the game's first four goals and by the time Minnesota had found the back of the net it was too late. The 'Back Door' Badgers fired 42 shots on goal, not letting up even with a 5-1 lead after two periods. Marc Behrend turned aside 30 of 33 shots in the contest and finished the tournament with a .932 save percentage in the Frozen Four, earning Tournament MOP honors. Despite the spectacular Frozen Four, John Newberry was the only Badger other than Behrend to make the All-Tournament Team but the Wisconsin faithful were too overjoyed from the unexpected championship to mind.

No Wisconsin player was named as an AHCA All-American and only Theran Welsh was named to the Second Team All-WCHA.

== Standings ==
1980–81 Western Collegiate Hockey Association standings
	Conference							Overall					
	GP	W	L	T	PTS	GF	GA	GP	W	L	T	GF	GA
Minnesota†*	28	20	8	0	40	152	104	45	33	12	0	261	174
Wisconsin	28	17	11	0	34	131	101	42	27	14	1	218	155
Michigan Tech*	28	17	11	0	34	118	102	44	29	14	1	195	155
Denver	28	15	11	2	32	120	111	40	23	15	2	233	197
Michigan	28	15	13	0	30	138	122	40	23	17	0	185	161
North Dakota	28	14	12	2	30	133	134	38	21	15	2	186	168
Colorado College	28	12	16	0	24	128	142	36	17	19	0	174	183
Minnesota-Duluth	28	11	17	0	22	120	150	39	17	21	1	165	197
Notre Dame	28	9	18	1	19	100	137	36	13	21	2	139	166
Michigan State	28	7	20	1	15	82	119	36	12	22	2	116	144
Championship: Michigan Tech, Minnesota † indicates conference regular season champion * indicates conference tournament champion

1980–81 Big Ten standings
	Conference							Overall					
	GP	W	L	T	Pct.	GF	GA	GP	W	L	T	GF	GA
Minnesota†	10	9	1	0	.900	61	35	45	33	12	0	261	174
Wisconsin	10	5	5	0	.500	45	45	42	27	14	1	218	155
Michigan	12	4	8	0	.333	42	54	40	23	17	0	185	161
Michigan State	8	2	6	0	.250	23	37	36	12	22	2	116	144
† indicates conference regular season champion

=== Schedule ===
During the season, Wisconsin compiled a 27–14–1 record. Its schedule was as follows.

Date	Opponent	Score	Result	Venue	Location	Record (WCHA / Big Ten)
Oct. 17, 1980	Western Michigan	7–3	Win	Dane County Coliseum	Madison, WI	1–0 (0–0 / 0–0)
Oct. 18, 1980	Western Michigan	5–4	Win	Dane County Coliseum	Madison, WI	2–0 (0–0 / 0–0)
Oct. 24, 1980	Denver †	5–3	Win	DU Arena	Denver, CO	3–0 (1–0 / 0–0)
Oct. 25, 1980	Denver †	3–5	Loss	DU Arena	Denver, CO	3–1 (1–1 / 0–0)
Oct. 31, 1980	Colorado College †	6–4	Win	Dane County Coliseum	Madison, WI	4–1 (2–1 / 0–0)
Nov. 1, 1980	Colorado College †	7–5	Win	Dane County Coliseum	Madison, WI	5–1 (3–1 / 0–0)
Nov. 17, 1980	Ferris State	8–2	Win	Dane County Coliseum	Madison, WI	6–1 (3–1 / 0–0)
Nov. 8, 1980	Ferris State	4–4	Win	Dane County Coliseum	Madison, WI	7–1 (3–1 / 0–0)
Nov. 14, 1980	Notre Dame †	4–5*	Loss	Dane County Coliseum	Madison, WI	7–2 (3–2 / 0–0)
Nov. 15, 1980	Notre Dame †	4–0	Win	Dane County Coliseum	Madison, WI	8–2 (4–2 / 0–0)
Nov. 21, 1980	Michigan ‡	5–3	Win	Yost Ice Arena	Ann Arbor, MI	9–2 (5–2 / 1–0)
Nov. 22, 1980	Michigan ‡	1–3	Loss	Yost Ice Arena	Ann Arbor, MI	9–3 (5–3 / 1–1)
Nov. 28, 1980	Minnesota ‡	4–5*	Loss	Dane County Coliseum	Madison, WI	9–4 (5–4 / 1–2)
Nov. 29, 1980	Minnesota ‡	8–3	Win	Dane County Coliseum	Madison, WI	10–4 (6–4 / 2–2)
Dec. 5, 1980	Minnesota–Duluth †	2–3	Loss	Duluth Arena	Duluth, MN	10–5 (6–5 / 2–2)
Dec. 6, 1980	Minnesota–Duluth †	5–3	Win	Duluth Arena	Duluth, MN	11–5 (7–5 / 2–2)
Dec. 28, 1980	Yale	10–5	Win	Dane County Coliseum	Madison, WI	12–5 (7–5 / 2–2)
Dec. 29, 1980	Yale	12–1	Win	Dane County Coliseum	Madison, WI	13–5 (7–5 / 2–2)
Jan. 2, 1981	Rensselaer	4–6	Loss	Dane County Coliseum	Madison, WI	13–6 (7–5 / 2–2)
Jan. 3, 1981	Rensselaer	5–6	Loss	Dane County Coliseum	Madison, WI	13–7 (7–5 / 2–2)
Jan. 9, 1981	Michigan ‡	8–5	Win	Dane County Coliseum	Madison, WI	14–7 (8–5 / 3–2)
Jan. 10, 1981	Michigan ‡	4–3	Win	Dane County Coliseum	Madison, WI	15–7 (9–5 / 4–2)
Jan. 16, 1981	Minnesota ‡	3–6	Loss	Williams Arena	Minneapolis, MN	15–8 (9–6 / 4–3)
Jan. 17, 1981	Minnesota ‡	4–8	Loss	Williams Arena	Minneapolis, MN	15–9 (9–7 / 4–4)
Jan. 23, 1981	Minnesota–Duluth †	7–2	Win	Dane County Coliseum	Madison, WI	16–9 (10–7 / 4–4)
Jan. 24, 1981	Minnesota–Duluth †	4–3	Win	Dane County Coliseum	Madison, WI	17–9 (11–7 / 4–4)
Jan. 30, 1981	Michigan Tech †	3–5	Loss	Dane County Coliseum	Madison, WI	17–10 (11–8 / 4–4)
Jan. 31, 1981	Michigan Tech †	6–2	Win	Dane County Coliseum	Madison, WI	18–10 (12–8 / 4–4)
Feb. 6, 1981	North Dakota †	10–1	Win	Ralph Engelstad Arena	Grand Forks, ND	19–10 (13–8 / 4–4)
Feb. 7, 1981	North Dakota †	5–4	Win	Ralph Engelstad Arena	Grand Forks, ND	20–10 (14–8 / 4–4)
Feb. 13, 1981	Colorado College †	4–3*	Win	Broadmoor World Arena	Colorado Springs, CO	21–10 (15–8 / 4–4)
Feb. 14, 1981	Colorado College †	2–4	Loss	Broadmoor World Arena	Colorado Springs, CO	21–11 (15–9 / 4–4)
Feb. 20, 1981	Michigan State ‡	3–5	Loss	Dane County Coliseum	Madison, WI	21–12 (15–10 / 4–5)
Feb. 21, 1981	Michigan State ‡	5–4	Win	Dane County Coliseum	Madison, WI	22–12 (16–10 / 5–5)
Feb. 27, 1981	Notre Dame †	2–4	Loss	Joyce Center	Notre Dame, IN	22–13 (16–11 / 5–5)
Feb. 28, 1981	Notre Dame †	8–2	Win	Joyce Center	Notre Dame, IN	23–13 (17–11 / 5–5)
WCHA TOURNAMENT
Mar. 7, 1981	Colorado College	8–2	Win	Dane County Coliseum	Madison, WI	24–13 (17–11 / 5–5)
Mar. 8, 1981	Colorado College	4–11	Loss	Dane County Coliseum	Madison, WI	24–14 (17–11 / 5–5)
Colorado College Wins Series 13-12
NCAA TOURNAMENT
March 20, 1981	Clarkson	3–2	Win	Walker Arena	Potsdam, NY	25–14 (17–11 / 5–5)
March 21, 1981	Clarkson	6–6*	Tie	Walker Arena	Potsdam, NY	25–14–1 (17–11 / 5–5)
March 27, 1981	Northern Michigan	5–1	Win	Duluth Arena	Duluth, MN	26–14–1 (17–11 / 5–5)
March 28, 1981	Minnesota	6–3	Win	Duluth Arena	Duluth, MN	27–14–1 (17–11 / 5–5)
		218–155				27–14–1 (17–11 / 5–5)

* Denotes overtime periods
† WCHA game
‡ Big Ten and WCHA game

== National championship ==
=== (W1) Minnesota vs. (W4) Wisconsin ===
March 28	Minnesota	3 – 6	Wisconsin	Duluth Arena

Scoring summary
Period	Team	Goal	Assist(s)	Time	Score
1st	WIS	Dan Gorowsky	Newberry and Vincent	9:24	1–0 WIS
1st	WIS	John Newberry – PP	Vincent and Welsh	14:49	2–0 WIS
1st	WIS	Ed Lebler	Ethier	19:49	3–0 WIS
2nd	WIS	Ted Pearson – GW	Lebler and Newberry	29:23	4–0 WIS
2nd	MIN	Butsy Erickson	Ulseth and Knoke	32:37	4–1 WIS
2nd	WIS	John Newberry – PP	S. Lecy and Vincent	34:27	5–1 WIS
3rd	MIN	Mike Knoke – PP	Jensen and A. Broten	40:10	5–2 WIS
3rd	MIN	Butsy Erickson – PP	Hartzell and A. Broten	56:09	5–3 WIS
3rd	WIS	Ed Lebler – EN	Driver	58:40	6–3 WIS
Penalty summary
Period	Team	Player	Penalty	Time	PIM
1st	WIS	John Newberry	Roughing	0:28	2:00
1st	MIN	Dave Jensen	Roughing	0:28	2:00
1st	WIS	Bruce Driver	Hooking	4:14	2:00
1st	WIS	Pat Ethier	Interference	9:35	2:00
1st	WIS	Brian Mullen	Charging	10:11	2:00
1st	MIN	Neal Broten	Cross–Checking	10:11	2:00
1st	WIS	Jay McFarlane	Charging	11:58	2:00
1st	MIN	Paul Butters	Interference	14:15	2:00
2nd	WIS	Theran Welsh	Holding	25:48	2:00
2nd	WIS	Pete Johnson	Hooking	30:31	2:00
2nd	MIN	Scott Bjugstad	High Sticking	32:51	2:00
2nd	MIN	Mike Meadows	Roughing	35:28	2:00
2nd	MIN	Bob Bergloff	Roughing	36:00	2:00
2nd	WIS	Pat Ethier	Elbowing	38:15	2:00
3rd	WIS	Ted Pearson	Hooking	45:21	2:00
3rd	WIS	Todd Lecy	Interference	55:06	2:00

Shots by period
Team	1	2	3	T
Wisconsin	11	14	17	42
Minnesota	8	10	15	33

Goaltenders
Team	Name	Saves	Goals against	Time on ice
WIS	Marc Behrend	30	3	
MIN	Paul Butters	33	5	
MIN	Jim Jetland	3	0	

== Roster and scoring statistics ==
No.	Name	Year	Position	Hometown	S/P/C	Games	Goals	Assists	Pts	PIM
16	Scott Lecy	Senior	W	Rochester, MN	(Minnesota)	42	26	49	75	44
20	Ron Vincent	Junior	RW	Saanich, BC	(British Columbia)	36	20	45	65	28
10	John Newberry	Freshman	C	Victoria, BC	(British Columbia)	39	30	32	62	77
5	Theran Welsh	Senior	D	Prince Albert, SK	(Saskatchewan)	41	10	44	54	52
11	Pete Johnson	Junior	C	Madison, WI	(Wisconsin)	41	30	23	53	44
26	Ed Lebler	Junior	LW	Vanderhoof, BC	(British Columbia)	42	28	24	52	20
19	Brian Mullen	Freshman	C	New York, NY	(New York (state))	38	11	13	24	28
7	Todd Lecy	Sophomore	LW	Rochester, MN	(Minnesota)	32	4	17	21	48
25	Bruce Driver	Freshman	D	Toronto, ON	(Ontario)	42	5	15	20	42
9	Lexi Doner	Sophomore	LW	Lynnwood, WA	(Washington (state))	30	7	11	18	16
12	John Johannson	Freshman	W	Rochester, MN	(Minnesota)	38	6	12	18	28
4	Pat Ethier	Sophomore	D	Saint Paul, MN	(Minnesota)	37	1	17	18	92
15	Dan Gorowsky	Senior	LW	White Bear Lake, MN	(Minnesota)	29	12	5	17	4
17	Ken Kuryluk	Junior	LW	Winnipeg, MB	(Manitoba)	42	8	9	17	2
24	Ted Pearson	Freshman	W	Edina, MN	(Minnesota)	36	6	9	15	59
2	Jay McFarlane	Junior	D	Edmonton, AB	(Alberta)	42	3	12	15	88
22	Jon Morgan	Senior	RW	Minnetonka, MN	(Minnesota)	19	2	8	10	14
3	Steve McKenzie	Freshman	D	Leduc, AB	(Alberta)	37	0	10	10	22
6	Jeff Andringa	Sophomore	D	Madison, WI	(Wisconsin)	37	1	7	8	10
13	Tom Carroll	Freshman	W	Edina, MN	(Minnesota)	6	3	1	4	4
21	Bruce Eakin	Freshman	C	Winnipeg, MB	(Manitoba)	4	1	3	4	2
29	Tim Sager	Freshman	W	Saint Paul, MN	(Minnesota)	4	1	2	3	0
23	Scott Sabo	Freshman	C	Thief River Falls, MN	(Minnesota)	17	2	0	2	10
14	Ed Repins	Sophomore	D	Shorewood, WI	(Wisconsin)	9	1	1	2	8
27	Brad Benson	Freshman	D	Edina, MN	(Minnesota)	14	0	2	2	2
18	John Dougherty	Sophomore	RW	Green Bay, WI	(Wisconsin)	5	0	0	0	0
8	Randy Keller	Junior	D	Victoria, BC	(British Columbia)	8	0	0	0	8
30	Jamey Gremore	Senior	G	White Bear Lake, MN	(Minnesota)	10	0	0	0	0
27	Marc Behrend	Freshman	G	Madison, WI	(Wisconsin)	16	0	0	0	0
1	Terry Kleisinger	Freshman	G	Nanaimo, BC	(British Columbia)	21	0	0	0	6
Total						860	264	441	705	794

== Goaltending Statistics ==
No.	Name	Games	Minutes	Wins	Losses	Ties	Goals against	Saves	Shut outs	SV %	GAA
27	Marc Behrend	16	913	11	4	1	50	500	0	0.909	3.29
1	Terry Kleisinger	21	1011	11	5	0	61	564	2	0.902	3.62
30	Jamey Gremore	10	596	5	5	0	43	294	0	0.872	4.34
Total			2520	27	14	1	154	1358	2	.898	3.67

== Players drafted into the NHL ==
=== 1981 NHL entry draft ===
= NHL All-Star team	= NHL All-Star	= NHL All-Star and NHL All-Star team	= Did not play in the NHL

Round	Pick	Player	NHL team
5	85	Marc Behrend	Winnipeg Jets
6	108	Bruce Driver	Colorado Rockies
10	192	John Johannson	Colorado Rockies

== See also ==
- 1981 NCAA Division I Men's Ice Hockey Tournament
- List of NCAA Division I Men's Ice Hockey Tournament champions
