= John Newberry =

John Newberry may refer to:

- John Newberry (ice hockey) (born 1962), Canadian professional ice hockey player
- John Strong Newberry (1822–1892), American geologist and explorer
- John Stoughton Newberry (1826–1887), American congressman and industrialist from Michigan

== See also ==
- John Newbery (1713–1767), British publisher of children's books
