= Don Sylvestri =

Canadian ice hockey player

- Born: June 2, 1961 (age 63); Sudbury, Ontario, Canada
- Height: 6 ft 1 in (185 cm)
- Weight: 180 lb (82 kg; 12 st 12 lb)
- Position: Goaltender
- Caught: Left
- Played for: Boston Bruins
- NHL draft: 182nd overall, 1981; Boston Bruins
- Playing career: 1984–1985

Don Sylvestri (born June 2, 1961) is a Canadian retired professional ice hockey player who played three games in the National Hockey League with the Boston Bruins during the 1984–85 season.

== Career statistics ==
=== Regular season and playoffs ===
			Regular season									Playoffs
Season	Team	League	GP	W	L	T	MIN	GA	SO	GAA	SV%	GP	W	L	MIN	GA	SO	GAA	SV%
1978–79	Nickle Centre Native Sons	NOJHL	30	—	—	—	1800	100	2	2.99	—	—	—	—	—	—	—	—	—
1979–80	Nickle Centre Native Sons	NOJHL	5	—	—	—	250	22	0	5.28	—	—	—	—	—	—	—	—	—
1979–80	Oshawa Generals	OMJHL	16	5	4	0	621	49	0	4.73	.864	—	—	—	—	—	—	—	—
1980–81	Clarkson University	ECAC	29	22	3	4	1740	84	1	2.90	.904	—	—	—	—	—	—	—	—
1981–82	Clarkson University	ECAC	30	22	6	1	1800	87	2	2.90	.881	—	—	—	—	—	—	—	—
1982–83	Clarkson University	ECAC	11	3	3	1	425	23	0	3.25	.869	—	—	—	—	—	—	—	—
1983–84	Clarkson University	ECAC	16	5	4	0	611	31	1	3.04	.879	—	—	—	—	—	—	—	—
1984–85	Boston Bruins	NHL	3	0	0	2	103	6	0	3.53	.885	—	—	—	—	—	—	—	—
1984–85	Indianapolis Checkers	IHL	14	5	7	0	676	57	0	5.06	.841	—	—	—	—	—	—	—	—
1984–85	Pineridge Bucks	ACHL	6	2	2	0	287	28	0	5.85	.839	—	—	—	—	—	—	—	—
NHL totals			3	0	0	2	103	6	0	3.53	.885	—	—	—	—	—	—	—	—

== Awards and honors ==
Award	Year
All-ECAC Hockey First Team	1980–81
AHCA East All-American	1980–81

Awards and achievements
Preceded by Mark Fusco	ECAC Hockey Rookie of the Year; 1980–81	Succeeded by Normand Lacombe
