= Peter Johnson (ice hockey coach) =

American ice hockey coach and scout (born 1959)

- Born: May 31, 1959 (age 66); Madison, Wisconsin, U.S.
- Position: Centre
- WCHA team: Wisconsin Badgers
- Played for: United States

Peter Johnson (born May 31, 1959) is an American ice hockey coach and scout.

== Early life ==
Johnson is the son of Hall of Fame coach Bob Johnson and brother of Wisconsin Badgers women's ice hockey coach Mark Johnson. He attended the University of Wisconsin–Madison, where he played on the men's ice hockey team and was a member of the 1981 National Championship team. Later, he played on the United States men's national ice hockey team at the 1982 World Ice Hockey Championships in Helsinki.

== Career ==
Johnson's first coaching experience was with the Bowling Green Falcons men's ice hockey team, where he was a member of the 1984 National Championship team. From 1985 to 1988, he was an assistant coach with the Cornell Big Red men's ice hockey team. Johnson joined the Wisconsin Badgers men's ice hockey team as an assistant coach in 1988 and was a member of the 1990 National Championship team. He later served as a scout for the Toronto Maple Leafs for nine years. During the 2009–2010 season he served as an assistant coach with the Wisconsin Badgers women's ice hockey team after the coaching staff was re-shuffled while his brother, Mark, took a leave of absence in order to coach the United States women's national ice hockey team in the 2010 Winter Olympics.

== See also ==
- List of family relations in the NHL
- Peter Johnson career statistics at The Internet Hockey Database
