= 1984–85 ACHL season =

The 1984–85 Atlantic Coast Hockey League season was the fourth season of the Atlantic Coast Hockey League, a North American minor professional league.

Five teams participated in the regular season, which was one less team that participated in the 1983-84 season. The Birmingham Bulls took part in the 1983-84 season but did not return for the 1984–85 ACHL season. They were evicted from their arena after three games and officially folded the franchise two weeks after their eviction.

The Carolina Thunderbirds led the league in regular season points (107) and won the Bob Paine Trophy as league champions. The 1984-85 season would be the final season of the Pinebridge Bucks.

== Regular season ==
	GP	W	L	T	GF	GA	Pts
Carolina Thunderbirds	64	53	10	1	374	220	107
Erie Golden Blades	64	41	22	1	362	261	83
Pinebridge Bucks	64	33	25	6	306	298	72
Virginia Lancers	64	19	41	4	298	434	42
Mohawk Valley Stars	64	14	45	5	290	417	33

== Playoffs ==
Semifinals
1	Carolina Thundebirds	4
4	Virginia Lancers	0
2	Erie Golden Blades	4
3	Pinebridge Bucks	2

Final
1	Carolina Thunderbirds	4
2	Erie Golden Blades	2

== Statistics ==
=== Scoring leaders ===
Regular season

Player	Team	GP	G	A	Pts	PIM
Paul Mancini	Erie Golden Blades	64	67	70	137	47
Dane Lane	Mohawk Valley Stars	63	69	53	122	158
Larry Power	Mohawk Valley Stars	62	59	60	119	49
Dave Herbst	Erie Golden Blades	59	47	70	117	185
Rob Clavette	Pinebridge Bucks	59	52	62	114	52
Scott Robins	Pinebridge Bucks	64	53	57	110	42
Don Shaw	Erie Golden Blades	64	54	55	109	41
Ron Carter	Virginia Lancers	57	56	48	104	10
Ron Hansis	Erie Golden Blades	64	27	76	103	117
Andre Chartrain	Virginia Lancers	48	34	67	101	12
