= Jeff Teal =

American ice hockey player (born 1960)

- Born: May 30, 1960 (age 65) Edina, Minnesota, U.S.A.
- Height: 6 ft 3 in (191 cm)
- Weight: 205 lb (93 kg; 14 st 9 lb)
- Position: Right wing
- Shot: Left
- Played for: Montreal Canadiens
- NHL draft: 82nd overall, 1980; Montreal Canadiens
- Playing career: 1982–1985

Jeffrey Brad Teal (born May 30, 1960) is an American former professional ice hockey forward. He played six games in the National Hockey League for the Montreal Canadiens during the 1984–85 season.

== Career statistics ==
=== Regular season and playoffs ===
			Regular season					Playoffs
Season	Team	League	GP	G	A	Pts	PIM	GP	G	A	Pts	PIM
1976–77	John Marshall High School	HS-MN	—	—	—	—	—	—	—	—	—	—
1977–78	John Marshall High School	HS-MN	—	—	—	—	—	—	—	—	—	—
1978–79	University of Minnesota	WCHA	39	2	4	6	12	—	—	—	—	—
1979–80	University of Minnesota	WCHA	37	10	15	25	30	—	—	—	—	—
1980–81	University of Minnesota	WCHA	45	15	9	24	38	—	—	—	—	—
1981–82	University of Minnesota	WCHA	36	13	9	22	46	—	—	—	—	—
1981–82	Nova Scotia Voyageurs	AHL	7	0	1	1	0	6	1	1	2	2
1982–83	Nova Scotia Voyageurs	AHL	76	8	20	28	14	7	0	1	1	2
1983–84	Nova Scotia Voyageurs	AHL	16	8	4	12	2	—	—	—	—	—
1984–85	Montreal Canadiens	NHL	6	0	1	1	0	—	—	—	—	—
1984–85	Sherbrooke Canadiens	AHL	69	18	24	42	16	17	4	8	12	8
AHL totals			168	34	49	83	32	30	5	10	15	12
NHL totals			6	0	1	1	0	—	—	—	—	—
