= Pinebridge Coliseum =

Arena in Spruce Pine, North Carolina, USA

- The Bridge Coliseum
- Interactive map of Pinebridge Coliseum
- Full name: Pinebridge Center Coliseum
- Location: Spruce Pine, North Carolina
- Coordinates: 35°54′46″N 82°4′3″W
- Capacity: 5,000

Tenant
- Pinebridge Bucks (ACHL) (1983–1985)

Pinebridge Coliseum, also known as The Bridge Coliseum, is a 5,000 seat indoor arena located in Spruce Pine, North Carolina. When it opened in 1983, it was the largest arena with an ice rink in North Carolina. It hosted the ice hockey team Pinebridge Bucks of the Atlantic Coast Hockey League from 1983 to 1985, becoming the smallest town to host a professional hockey team.
