= Michael Lauen =

American ice hockey player (born 1961)

- Born: February 9, 1961 (age 65) Edina, Minnesota, U.S.
- Height: 6 ft 1 in (185 cm)
- Weight: 185 lb (84 kg; 13 st 3 lb)
- Position: Right wing
- Shot: Right
- Played for: Winnipeg Jets
- National team: United States
- NHL draft: 135th overall, 1980; Winnipeg Jets
- Playing career: 1983–1986

Michael Arthur "Mike" Lauen (born February 9, 1961) is a former professional ice hockey player who played four games in the National Hockey League during the 1983–84 season. He played for the Winnipeg Jets.

== Career statistics ==
=== Regular season and playoffs ===
			Regular season					Playoffs
Season	Team	League	GP	G	A	Pts	PIM	GP	G	A	Pts	PIM
1976–77	Edina East High School	HS-MN	—	—	—	—	—	—	—	—	—	—
1977–78	Edina East High School	HS-MN	—	—	—	—	—	—	—	—	—	—
1978–79	Edina East High School	HS-MN	—	—	—	—	—	—	—	—	—	—
1979–80	Michigan Tech	WCHA	35	24	21	45	16	—	—	—	—	—
1980–81	Michigan Tech	WCHA	44	24	20	44	14	—	—	—	—	—
1981–82	Michigan Tech	WCHA	30	13	15	28	28	—	—	—	—	—
1982–83	Michigan Tech	WCHA	38	12	17	29	18	—	—	—	—	—
1982–83	Sherbrooke Jets	AHL	5	0	3	3	0	—	—	—	—	—
1983–84	Winnipeg Jets	NHL	4	0	1	1	0	—	—	—	—	—
1983–84	Sherbrooke Jets	AHL	61	23	29	52	13	—	—	—	—	—
1984–85	Sherbrooke Canadiens	AHL	25	6	10	16	2	—	—	—	—	—
1985–86	Toledo Goaldiggers	IHL	27	4	10	14	16	—	—	—	—	—
AHL totals			91	29	42	71	15	—	—	—	—	—
NHL totals			4	0	1	1	0	—	—	—	—	—

=== International ===
Year	Team	Event	GP	G	A	Pts	PIM
1980	United States	WJC	5	3	2	5	8
Junior totals			5	3	2	5	8
