= Mike Blake =

Canadian ice hockey player (1956–2022)

- Born: April 6, 1956; Kitchener, Ontario, Canada
- Died: November 29, 2022 (aged 66)
- Height: 6 ft 1 in (185 cm)
- Weight: 190 lb (86 kg; 13 st 8 lb)
- Position: Goaltender
- Caught: Left
- Played for: Los Angeles Kings
- NHL draft: Undrafted
- Playing career: 1981–1985

Michael Wilmer Blake (April 6, 1956 – November 29, 2022) was a Canadian ice hockey goaltender who played 40 games in the National Hockey League with the Los Angeles Kings between 1982 and 1984. Blake was born in Kitchener, Ontario.

His uncle Toe Blake was a famous Montreal Canadiens player, playing with Rocket Richard.

Blake was in goal for Wayne Gretzky's record-setting 92nd goal of the season on March 28, 1982.

Blake died on November 29, 2022.

== Career statistics ==
=== Regular season and playoffs ===
			Regular season									Playoffs
Season	Team	League	GP	W	L	T	MIN	GA	SO	GAA	SV%	GP	W	L	MIN	GA	SO	GAA	SV%
1973–74	Sarnia Bees	WOHL	—	—	—	—	—	—	—	—	—	—	—	—	—	—	—	—	—
1974–75	Guelph Biltmores	SOJHL	—	—	—	—	—	—	—	—	—	—	—	—	—	—	—	—	—
1975–76	Guelph Holody Platers	SOJHL	—	—	—	—	—	—	—	—	—	—	—	—	—	—	—	—	—
1976–77	Guelph Holody Platers	SOJHL	—	—	—	—	—	—	—	—	—	—	—	—	—	—	—	—	—
1977–78	Ohio State University	CCHA	18	7	9	0	980	71	0	4.35	.885	—	—	—	—	—	—	—	—
1978–79	Ohio State University	CCHA	21	11	6	0	1080	78	0	4.33	.876	—	—	—	—	—	—	—	—
1979–80	Ohio State University	CCHA	15	8	4	1	775	48	0	3.72	.896	—	—	—	—	—	—	—	—
1980–81	Ohio State University	CCHA	37	22	9	3	2098	125	2	3.57	.895	—	—	—	—	—	—	—	—
1981–82	Los Angeles Kings	NHL	2	0	0	0	51	2	0	2.35	.938	—	—	—	—	—	—	—	—
1981–82	Saginaw Gears	IHL	36	—	—	—	1984	151	0	4.57	—	10	—	—	621	37	0	3.57	—
1982–83	Los Angeles Kings	NHL	9	4	4	0	431	30	0	4.18	.857	—	—	—	—	—	—	—	—
1982–83	New Haven Nighthawks	AHL	20	8	7	4	1178	72	1	3.67	.885	7	5	2	428	16	0	2.24	—
1983–84	Los Angeles Kings	NHL	29	9	11	5	1631	118	0	4.34	.867	—	—	—	—	—	—	—	—
1983–84	New Haven Nighthawks	AHL	16	7	8	0	864	64	0	4.44	.881	—	—	—	—	—	—	—	—
1984–85	New Haven Nighthawks	AHL	42	17	19	4	2425	168	1	4.16	.876	—	—	—	—	—	—	—	—
NHL totals			40	13	15	5	2113	150	0	4.26	.867	—	—	—	—	—	—	—	—

== Awards and honours ==
Award	Year
All-CCHA First Team	1980-81
