= Bryan Cleaver =

Canadian ice hockey player

- Born: 1956 (age 69–70) Ottawa, Ontario, Canada
- Height: 5 ft 8 in (173 cm)
- Weight: 175 lb (79 kg; 12 st 7 lb)
- Position: Center
- Shot: Left
- Played for: Clarkson
- Playing career: 1977–1981

Bryan Cleaver (born 1956) is a Canadian retired ice hockey center who was an All-American for Clarkson.

== Career ==
Cleaver began attending Clarkson University in the fall of 1977, after using up his final year of junior hockey eligibility. He played mot of his freshman year with the team but produced rather paltry numbers. His play improved significantly as a sophomore and Cleaver more than doubled his point total while playing in every game. Prior to his junior year, Bill O'Flaherty was brought in as the new head coach. Cleaver's numbers decreased slightly but he was still a key contributor for the best offensive squad in ECAC Hockey.

Cleaver was named team co-captain for his senior year, along with Ed Small, and he led Clarkson to its best regular season in almost 20 years. The Golden Knights finished the season atop their conference standings With Cleaver leading the top offense in the east with 68 points. He finished tied for 9th in the nation and was named as an All-American, one of three Clarkson players so homered in 1981. Unfortunately, Cleaver could not shake the Golden Knights out of their postseason doldrums; After escaping with a narrow victory in the quarterfinals, Providence ended their championship bid with a 3–4 overtime loss. Clarkson, however, did have some good news as the NCAA tournament had been expanded to 8 teams that season and the Golden Knights received an at-large bid.

In the quarterfinals, the NCAA had decided on a in a two-game, total-goal series for each matchup. In the first game against Wisconsin, Clarkson fell by a 2–3 margin but had plenty of opportunities to even the ledger in game 2. Clarkson scored 6 goals but it was their defense, which had been so strong all season long, that failed them. The two teams ended with a 6–6 tie and the Badgers skated away with the victory.

Cleaver's playing career ended after his graduation and he went on to a work as a consultant. He eventually worked his way up to being the CEO at BMC Consulting before his retirement in 2019.

== Statistics ==
=== Regular season and playoffs ===
| | | | Regular Season | | | | | Playoffs |
| Season | Team | League | GP | G | A | Pts | PIM | GP | G | A | Pts | PIM |
|---|---|---|---|---|---|---|---|---|---|---|---|---|
| 1976–77 | Toronto Nationals | OPJHL | 40 | 44 | 36 | 80 | 53 | — | — | — | — | — |
| 1977–78 | Clarkson | ECAC Hockey | 23 | 8 | 10 | 18 | 20 | — | — | — | — | — |
| 1978–79 | Clarkson | ECAC Hockey | 31 | 20 | 20 | 40 | 38 | — | — | — | — | — |
| 1979–80 | Clarkson | ECAC Hockey | 34 | 17 | 18 | 35 | 56 | — | — | — | — | — |
| 1980–81 | Clarkson | ECAC Hockey | 37 | 24 | 44 | 68 | 38 | — | — | — | — | — |
| NCAA totals | | | 125 | 69 | 92 | 161 | 152 | — | — | — | — | — |

== Awards and honors ==
| Award | Year |
|---|---|
| All-ECAC Hockey First Team | 1980–81 |
| AHCA East All-American | 1980–81 |
