= Jeff Pyle (ice hockey) =

American ice hockey player and coach (born 1958)

- Born: October 7, 1958 (age 67) St. Robert, Missouri
- Height: 6 ft 0 in (183 cm)
- Weight: 175 lb (79 kg; 12 st 7 lb)
- Position: Left wing
- Shot: Left
- Played for: AHL; Binghamton Whalers; IHL; Saginaw Gears; Flint Generals; Saginaw Hawks; ACHL; Mohawk Valley Stars
- NHL draft: Undrafted
- Playing career: 1981–1993

Jeff Pyle (born October 7, 1958) is an American former ice hockey player and the current director of hockey operations of the ECHL Atlanta Gladiators.

== Career ==
Pyle began coaching in the ECHL during the 1998–99 season, when he coached the Mobile Mysticks. He remained as the head coach when the franchise moved to Gwinnett County to become the Gwinnett Gladiators for the 2003–04 season, staying in this position through the end of the 2010–11 season.

On July 13, 2011, Pyle was named head coach of the American Hockey League's Texas Stars.

It was announced on April 11, 2013, that Pyle would become the head coach and director of hockey operations of the ECHL's Evansville IceMen, effective July 1, 2013. On April 20, 2014, Pyle was relieved of his duties with Evansville due to disagreements on hockey operations with owner Ron Geary.

In September 2014, Pyle moved to Italy to become head coach of the HC Valpellice Bulldogs of Torre Pellice (TO), Piedmont.

On March 22, 2016, Pyle returned to the Evansville area as the head coach of the Southern Professional Hockey League's Evansville Thunderbolts, which was announced to replace the departing ECHL IceMen franchise.

In 2018, Pyle returned to Gwinnett County, Georgia, as the head coach of his old team, the since renamed Atlanta Gladiators.

On June 6, 2023, Pyle was promoted by the Atlanta Gladiators from head coach and general manager to director of hockey operations.

== Career statistics ==
			Regular season					Playoffs
Season	Team	League	GP	G	A	Pts	PIM	GP	G	A	Pts	PIM
1978–79	Northern Michigan University	NCAA	34	15	27	42	4	—	—	—	—	—
1979–80	Northern Michigan University	NCAA	41	26	37	63	12	—	—	—	—	—
1980–81	Northern Michigan University	NCAA	40	35	53	88	20	—	—	—	—	—
1981–82	Binghamton Whalers	AHL	16	1	1	2	15	—	—	—	—	—
1981–82	Saginaw Gears	IHL	4	2	3	5	0	—	—	—	—	—
1981–82	Mohawk Valley Stars	ACHL	29	16	34	50	16	12	7	9	16	6
1982–83	Mohawk Valley Stars	ACHL	59	53	48	101	44	9	4	4	8	6
1983–84	Flint Generals	IHL	80	44	59	103	20	8	7	8	15	11
1984–85	Flint Generals	IHL	82	35	59	94	51	7	1	6	7	13
1985–86	Saginaw Generals	IHL	80	39	70	109	49	11	4	12	16	2
1986–87	Saginaw Generals	IHL	82	49	87	136	34	10	3	6	9	8
1987–88	Duisburger SV	Germany2	14	14	22	36	8	—	—	—	—	—
1987–88	Saginaw Hawks	IHL	66	30	47	77	19	10	3	4	7	8
1988–89	SV Bayreuth	Germany2	20	18	27	45	4	—	—	—	—	—
1989–90	SV Bayreuth	Germany2	35	37	63	100	0	—	—	—	—	—
1990–91	SV Bayreuth	Germany2	34	27	87	114	21	—	—	—	—	—
1991–92	SV Bayreuth	Germany2	39	22	40	62	25	—	—	—	—	—
1992–93	SV Bayreuth	Germany2	31	13	30	43	4	—	—	—	—	—
AHL totals			16	1	1	2	15	—	—	—	—	—
IHL totals			394	199	325	524	173	46	18	36	54	42
Germany2 totals			173	131	269	400	62	—	—	—	—	—

== Awards and honors ==
Award	Year
All-CCHA First Team	1980–81
CCHA Player of the Year	1980–81
James Gatschene Memorial Trophy - IHL Most Valuable Player	1986–87
Leo P. Lamoureux Memorial Trophy - IHL Leading Point Scorer	1986–87
John Brophy Award - ECHL Coach of the Year	2021-22
NMU Sports Hall of Fame	2022

Awards and achievements
Preceded by Steve Weeks	CCHA Player of the Year; 1980–81	Succeeded by George McPhee
