= Dan Fridgen =

Canadian ice hockey player

- Born: May 18, 1959 (age 66); Arnprior, Ontario, Canada
- Height: 5 ft 11 in (180 cm)
- Weight: 175 lb (79 kg; 12 st 7 lb)
- Position: Left wing
- Shot: Left
- Played for: Hartford Whalers
- NHL draft: Undrafted
- Playing career: 1982–1984

Daniel J. Fridgen (born May 18, 1959) is a Canadian former professional ice hockey forward. He played 13 games in the National Hockey League with the Hartford Whalers between 1982 and 1983. After his playing career, Fridgen coached at both Union College and Rensselaer Polytechnic Institute for several years.

== Career ==
Fridgen played four seasons of college hockey with Colgate University, where he still holds the record for most goals in a season (38) and most points in a season (68). Fridgen signed with the Hartford Whalers as a free agent on April 5, 1982. He went on to play 13 regular-season games for the Whalers in two seasons, scoring two goals and three assists for five points. He split his time with the American Hockey League's Binghamton Whalers, where he spent the entire 1983–84 season. Fridgen's career ended prematurely in August 1984 when he suffered head injuries in a car accident, officially announcing his retirement on November 1, 1984.

Fridgen was the assistant hockey coach at Union College from 1985 to 1989. He became the assistant coach of Rensselaer Polytechnic Institute in 1989 and head coach in 1994, remaining until 2006. Fridgen holds the coaching record for the most wins (211) at RPI.

Fridgen is currently part of PuckAgency. PuckAgency represents several elite hockey players. His son, Corbin, is a graduate of UVM, while his daughter, Callan, is a graduate of SUNY Oneonta.

== Career statistics ==
=== Regular season and playoffs ===
			Regular season					Playoffs
Season	Team	League	GP	G	A	Pts	PIM	GP	G	A	Pts	PIM
1977–78	Pembroke Lumber Kings	CJHL	31	18	21	39	85	—	—	—	—	—
1978–79	Colgate University	ECAC	26	20	12	32	54	—	—	—	—	—
1979–80	Colgate University	ECAC	25	19	18	37	74	—	—	—	—	—
1980–81	Colgate University	ECAC	33	37	31	68	164	—	—	—	—	—
1981–82	Colgate University	ECAC	29	38	17	55	95	—	—	—	—	—
1981–82	Hartford Whalers	NHL	2	0	1	1	0	—	—	—	—	—
1982–83	Hartford Whalers	NHL	11	2	2	4	2	—	—	—	—	—
1982–83	Binghamton Whalers	AHL	48	22	16	38	24	4	1	0	1	12
1983–84	Binghamton Whalers	AHL	77	23	27	50	61	—	—	—	—	—
AHL totals			125	45	43	88	85	4	1	0	1	12
NHL totals			13	2	3	5	2	—	—	—	—	—

== College Head Coaching Record ==
Dan Fridgen
Coaching career (HC unless noted)
- 1985–1989: Union (Asst.)
- 1989–1993: Rensselaer (Asst.)
- 1994–2006: Rensselaer

Head coaching record
- Overall: 211–193–38 (.520)

Accomplishments and honors

Championships
- 1978 CCHL Champion; 1978 Art Bogart Cup Champion; 1995 ECAC Tournament champion

Statistics overview
Season	Team	Overall	Conference	Standing	Postseason
Rensselaer Engineers (ECAC Hockey) (1994–2006)
1994–95	Rensselaer	19–14–4	10–9–3	6th	NCAA West regional quarterfinals
1995–96	Rensselaer	10–22–3	7–13–2	T–7th	ECAC Quarterfinals
1996–97	Rensselaer	20–12–4	12–7–3	4th	ECAC third-place game (win)
1997–98	Rensselaer	18–13–4	11–7–4	3rd	ECAC first round
1998–99	Rensselaer	23–12–2	13–7–2	3rd	ECAC third-place game (win)
1999–00	Rensselaer	22–13–2	11–9–1	3rd	ECAC Runner-Up
2000–01	Rensselaer	17–15–2	11–9–2	T–5th	ECAC first round
2001–02	Rensselaer	20–13–4	10–9–3	T–3rd	ECAC third-place game (win)
2002–03	Rensselaer	12–25–3	4–15–3	11th	ECAC Quarterfinals
2003–04	Rensselaer	22–15–2	13–8–1	T–4th	ECAC Quarterfinals
2004–05	Rensselaer	14–22–2	6–15–1	11th	ECAC first round
2005–06	Rensselaer	14–17–6	8–8–6	T–6th	ECAC first round
Rensselaer:		211–193–38	116–116–31		
Total:		211–193–38			
National champion Postseason invitational champion Conference regular season champion Conference regular season and conference tournament champion Division regular season champion Division regular season and conference tournament champion Conference tournament champion

== Awards and honors ==
Award	Year
All-ECAC Hockey Second team	1980–81

ECAC Top 50 in 50 - https://gocolgateraiders.com/news/2011/2/16/MHOCKEY_0216114838.aspx

Colgate University Athletic Hall of Honor - https://gocolgateraiders.com/hof.aspx?hof=198
