= Bill O'Flaherty =

Canadian ice hockey player

Biographical details
- Born: Etobicoke, Ontario, Canada

Playing career
- 1967–1970: Clarkson

Coaching career (HC unless noted)
- 1971–1979: Clarkson (assistant)
- 1979–1985: Clarkson
- 1984–1997: Clarkson (Athletic Director)
- 1997–2006: Los Angeles Kings (Dir. of Player Personnel)
- 2006–2007: Pittsburgh Penguins (Scout)
- 2007–2010: Florida Panthers (Dir. of Pro Scouting)

Head coaching record
- Overall: 134-59-12 (.683)

Accomplishments and honors

Championships
- 1981 ECAC Hockey West Region Champion; 1981 ECAC Hockey Champion; 1982 ECAC Hockey West Region Champion; 1982 ECAC Hockey Champion

Awards
- 1981 Spencer Penrose Award

Bill O'Flaherty is a Canadian ice hockey player, coach and executive. He was the head coach of Clarkson for six years before moving on to become the school's athletic director, compiling one of the highest winning percentages in the history of college hockey.

== Career ==
Bill O'Flaherty began attending Clarkson in 1967, playing under legendary coach Len Ceglarski for two full seasons and graduating in 1971 with a bachelor's in Humanities. O'Flaherty immediately moved to coaching afterwards, taking a position at Clarkson first under Ceglarski, then Jerry York after the former left to become the head coach at Boston College in 1972. O'Flaherty remained as an assistant until York himself left to take over at Bowling Green and O'Flaherty was chosen as his successor.

O'Flaherty had immediate and consistent success with the Golden Knights, winning 21 games in his first season (1979–80) and continuing that trend for his entire tenure. In his second and third seasons O'Flaherty got Clarkson 26-wins which provided the team with their only 2 back-to-back ECAC Hockey regular season titles in school history and getting them to their first NCAA tournament in over a decade. In six seasons behind the bench O'Flaherty provided five 20-win seasons, 6 winning records, 3 NCAA tournament berths, and 2 conference regular season titles. O'Flaherty was awarded the Spencer Penrose Award in 1981 for prompting Clarkson to a superb season, the fourth consecutive coach at Clarkson to earn the honour.

O'Flaherty moved into the front office, assuming the sole duties as Clarkson's Athletic Director in 1986 and remaining at that post until 1997 when he jumped to the NHL to serve as Director of Player Personnel for the Los Angeles Kings. O'Flaherty joined the staff of the Pittsburgh Penguins as professional scout for one season (2006–07) before becoming the Director of Pro Scouting for the Florida Panthers, remaining there until 2010.

== Personal life ==
Bill is the son of former NHLer John "Peanuts" O'Flaherty who spent most of his career in the minor leagues for the Pittsburgh Hornets. Bill's brother Gerry O'Flaherty was drafted by the Toronto Maple Leafs in 1970 and spent parts of 8 seasons in the NHL as a player, eventually winning 3 Stanley Cups as a scout.

== Head coaching record ==
Record table
Season	Team	Overall	Conference	Standing	Postseason
Clarkson Golden Knights (ECAC Hockey) (1979–1985)
1979–80	Clarkson	21-12-1	14-7-0	5th	ECAC Consolation Game (Loss)
1980–81	Clarkson	26-7-4	17-2-1	1st	NCAA Quarterfinals
1981–82	Clarkson	26-8-1	15-4-1	1st	NCAA Quarterfinals
1982–83	Clarkson	19-11-1	13-6-1	5th	ECAC Quarterfinals
1983–84	Clarkson	21-11-2	14-6-0	4th	NCAA Quarterfinals
1984–85	Clarkson	21-10-3	15-6-0	3rd	ECAC Consolation Game (Loss)
Clarkson:		134-59-12	88-31-3		
Total:		134-59-12			
National champion Postseason invitational champion Conference regular season champion Conference regular season and conference tournament champion Division regular season champion Division regular season and conference tournament champion Conference tournament champion

Awards and achievements
Preceded by Rick Comley	Spencer Penrose Award; 1980–81	Succeeded by Fernie Flaman
