= 1981 WCHA men's ice hockey tournament =

1981 WCHA Men's ice hockey tournament
- Dates: March 6–15, 1981
- Teams: 8
- Finals site: Student Ice Arena; Houghton, Michigan; Williams Arena; Minneapolis, Minnesota
- Champions: Michigan Tech† (9th title); Minnesota‡ (8th title)
- Winning coach: John MacInnes (9th title); Brad Buetow (2nd title)
- WCHA Men's Ice Hockey Tournaments

The 1981 WCHA Men's Ice Hockey Tournament was the 22nd conference playoff in league history. The tournament was played between March 6 and March 15, 1981. All games were played at home team campus sites, including each of the two regional final series. By winning the regional tournaments, both Michigan Tech and Minnesota received automatic bids to the 1981 NCAA Division I Men's Ice Hockey Tournament.

Though not official designations, Michigan Tech is considered as the East Regional Champion† and Minnesota as the West Regional Champion‡.

This was the final year that the WCHA crowned two teams as tournament champions. (as of 2014)

== Format ==
The top eight teams in the WCHA, according to their final conference standings, were eligible for the tournament and were seeded No. 1 through No. 8. In the first round the first and eighth seeds, the second and seventh seeds, the third and sixth seeds and the fourth and fifth seeds were matched in two-game series where the school that scored the higher number of goals was declared the winner. After the first round the remaining teams were reseeded No. 1 through No. 4 according to their final conference standings and advanced to the second round. In the second round the first and fourth seeds and the second and third seeds competed in an additional two-game, total goal series with the winners of each being declared as co-conference champions. The Tournament Champions each received automatic bids to the 1981 NCAA Division I Men's Ice Hockey Tournament.

=== Conference standings ===
Note: GP = Games played; W = Wins; L = Losses; T = Ties; PTS = Points; GF = Goals For; GA = Goals Against

1980–81 Western Collegiate Hockey Association standings
	Conference							Overall					
	GP	W	L	T	PTS	GF	GA	GP	W	L	T	GF	GA
Minnesota†*	28	20	8	0	40	152	104	45	33	12	0	261	174
Wisconsin	28	17	11	0	34	131	101	42	27	14	1	218	155
Michigan Tech*	28	17	11	0	34	118	102	44	29	14	1	195	155
Denver	28	15	11	2	32	120	111	40	23	15	2	233	197
Michigan	28	15	13	0	30	138	122	40	23	17	0	185	161
North Dakota	28	14	12	2	30	133	134	38	21	15	2	186	168
Colorado College	28	12	16	0	24	128	142	36	17	19	0	174	183
Minnesota-Duluth	28	11	17	0	22	120	150	39	17	21	1	165	197
Notre Dame	28	9	18	1	19	100	137	36	13	21	2	139	166
Michigan State	28	7	20	1	15	82	119	36	12	22	2	116	144
Championship: Michigan Tech, Minnesota † indicates conference regular season champion * indicates conference tournament champion

== Bracket ==
Teams are reseeded after the first round

First Round; March 6–8
1	Minnesota	5	5	10
8	Minnesota-Duluth	1	7	8
2	Wisconsin	8	4	12
7	Colorado College	2	11	13
3	Michigan Tech	7	4	11
6	North Dakota	4	1	5
4	Denver	2	4	6
5	Michigan	5	5	10

Second Round; March 13–15
1	Minnesota	7	7	14
7	Colorado College	1	9	10
3	Michigan Tech	2	7	9
5	Michigan	1	1	2

Note: * denotes overtime period(s)

=== First round ===
==== (1) Minnesota vs. (8) Minnesota-Duluth ====
March 7	Minnesota	5 – 1	Minnesota-Duluth	Williams Arena

March 8	Minnesota	5 – 7	Minnesota-Duluth	Williams Arena

Minnesota won series 10–8

==== (2) Wisconsin vs. (7) Colorado College ====
March 7	Wisconsin	8 – 2	Colorado College	Dane County Coliseum

March 8	Wisconsin	4 – 11	Colorado College	Dane County Coliseum

Colorado College won series 13–12

==== (3) Michigan Tech vs. (6) North Dakota ====
March 6	Michigan Tech	7 – 4	North Dakota	Student Ice Arena

March 7	Michigan Tech	4 – 1	North Dakota	Student Ice Arena

Michigan Tech won series 11–5

==== (4) Denver vs. (5) Michigan ====
March 6	Denver	2 – 5	Michigan	DU Arena

March 7	Denver	4 – 5	Michigan	DU Arena

Michigan won series 10–6

=== Second round ===
==== (1) Minnesota vs. (7) Colorado College ====
March 14	Minnesota	7 – 1	Colorado College	Williams Arena

March 15	Minnesota	7 – 9	Colorado College	Williams Arena

Minnesota won series 14–10

==== (3) Michigan Tech vs. (5) Michigan ====
March 13	Michigan Tech	2 – 1	Michigan	Student Ice Arena

March 14	Michigan Tech	7 – 1	Michigan	Student Ice Arena

Michigan Tech won series 9–2

== Tournament awards ==
None

== See also ==
- Western Collegiate Hockey Association men's champions
