= Aaron Broten =

American ice hockey player (born 1960)

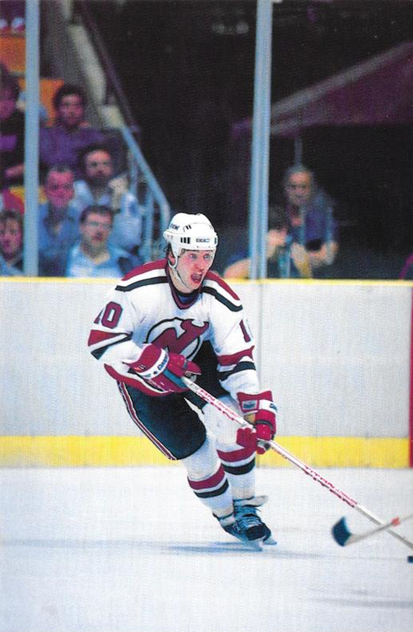
- Born: November 14, 1960 (age 65) Roseau, Minnesota, U.S.
- Height: 5 ft 10 in (178 cm)
- Weight: 180 lb (82 kg; 12 st 12 lb)
- Position: Center
- Shot: Left
- Played for: Colorado Rockies; New Jersey Devils; Minnesota North Stars; Quebec Nordiques; Toronto Maple Leafs; Winnipeg Jets
- National team: United States
- NHL draft: 106th overall, 1980; Colorado Rockies
- Playing career: 1980–1992

Aaron Kent Broten (born November 14, 1960) is an American former professional ice hockey player. Drafted in the sixth round, 106th overall in the 1980 NHL entry draft by the Colorado Rockies, Broten went on to play 748 regular season games in the National Hockey League (NHL).

== Career ==
Broten was born in Roseau, Minnesota. He is the brother of former NHL players Neal Broten and Paul Broten. Broten's nephew, Shane Gersich, was drafted by the Washington Capitals in the 2014 NHL entry draft.

During his twelve-year career, Broten played for six different NHL teams, including both parts of the Colorado Rockies/New Jersey Devils franchise, the Minnesota North Stars, the Quebec Nordiques, the Toronto Maple Leafs, and the Winnipeg Jets.

In international hockey, Broten played for the United States national team at the 1981, 1982, 1985, 1986 and 1987 Ice Hockey World Championships as well as the 1984 Canada Cup and 1987 Canada Cup tournaments. Broten retired from professional hockey in 1992, but briefly came out of retirement in 1999 to once again play for the US national team in the 1999 Ice Hockey World Championship qualifying tournament (the U.S. team featuring several NHL players had surprisingly finished among the bottom four in the previous 1998 world championship tournament) when no active NHL players were available.

Broten was chosen to be inducted into the United States Hockey Hall of Fame as part of the 2007 class.

== Awards and honors ==
Award	Year
All-WCHA First Team	1980–81
AHCA West All-American	1980–81
All-NCAA All-Tournament Team	1981

== Career statistics ==
=== Regular season and playoffs ===
			Regular season					Playoffs
Season	Team	League	GP	G	A	Pts	PIM	GP	G	A	Pts	PIM
1976–77	Roseau High School	HS-MN	20	12	24	36	—	—	—	—	—	—
1977–78	Roseau High School	HS-MN	20	50	52	102	—	—	—	—	—	—
1978–79	Roseau High School	HS-MN	20	43	88	131	—	—	—	—	—	—
1979–80	University of Minnesota	WCHA	41	25	47	72	8	—	—	—	—	—
1980–81	University of Minnesota	WCHA	45	47	59	106	24	—	—	—	—	—
1980–81	Colorado Rockies	NHL	2	0	0	0	0	—	—	—	—	—
1981–82	Fort Worth Texans	CHL	19	15	21	36	11	—	—	—	—	—
1981–82	Colorado Rockies	NHL	58	15	24	39	6	—	—	—	—	—
1982–83	Wichita Wind	CHL	4	0	4	4	0	—	—	—	—	—
1982–83	New Jersey Devils	NHL	73	16	39	55	28	—	—	—	—	—
1983–84	New Jersey Devils	NHL	80	13	23	36	36	—	—	—	—	—
1984–85	New Jersey Devils	NHL	80	22	35	57	38	—	—	—	—	—
1985–86	New Jersey Devils	NHL	66	18	25	43	26	—	—	—	—	—
1986–87	New Jersey Devils	NHL	80	26	53	79	36	—	—	—	—	—
1987–88	New Jersey Devils	NHL	80	26	57	83	80	20	5	11	16	20
1988–89	New Jersey Devils	NHL	80	16	43	59	81	—	—	—	—	—
1989–90	New Jersey Devils	NHL	42	10	8	18	36	—	—	—	—	—
1989–90	Minnesota North Stars	NHL	35	9	9	18	22	7	0	5	5	8
1990–91	Quebec Nordiques	NHL	20	5	4	9	6	—	—	—	—	—
1990–91	Toronto Maple Leafs	NHL	27	6	4	10	32	—	—	—	—	—
1991–92	Winnipeg Jets	NHL	25	4	5	9	14	7	2	2	4	12
1991–92	Moncton Hawks	AHL	4	0	2	2	0	—	—	—	—	—
NHL totals			748	186	329	515	441	34	7	18	25	40

=== International ===
Year	Team	Event	GP	G	A	Pts	PIM
1979	United States	WJC	5	4	3	7	0
1981	United States	WC	8	2	2	4	0
1982	United States	WC	7	2	2	4	8
1984	United States	CC	5	0	4	4	4
1985	United States	WC	10	0	1	1	8
1986	United States	WC	10	2	6	8	14
1987	United States	WC	10	5	6	11	6
1987	United States	CC	5	0	2	2	2
1998	United States	WC Q	3	0	0	0	0
Junior totals			5	4	3	7	0
Senior totals			55	11	23	34	42

Awards and achievements
Preceded by Kevin Maxwell	WCHA Freshman of the Year; 1979–80	Succeeded by Ron Scott
Preceded by Bill Joyce	NCAA Ice Hockey Scoring Champion; 1980–81	Succeeded by Ed Beers
