= Bob Johnson (ice hockey, born 1931) =

American ice hockey coach

- Hockey Hall of Fame, 1992 (Builder)
- Johnson in 1990
- Born: March 4, 1931 Minneapolis, Minnesota, U.S.
- Died: November 26, 1991 (aged 60) Colorado Springs, Colorado, U.S.
- Coaching career

Playing career
- 1950–1951: North Dakota
- 1951–1952: Minneapolis Millers
- 1952–1954: Minnesota
- 1957–1958: Minnesota Culbertsons
- Position: Forward

Coaching career (HC unless noted)
- 1956–1957: Warroad High
- 1957–1963: Roosevelt High
- 1963–1966: Colorado College
- 1966–1975: Wisconsin
- 1973: US National Team
- 1974: US National Team
- 1975: US National Team
- 1975–1976: US Olympic Team
- 1976–1982: Wisconsin
- 1981: Team USA
- 1982–1987: Calgary Flames
- 1984: Team USA
- 1987: Team USA
- 1990–1991: Pittsburgh Penguins

Head coaching record
- Overall: 394–224–27 (.632)
- Tournaments: 9–5 (.643)

Accomplishments and honors

Championships
- 1970 WCHA tournament champion 1972 WCHA tournament champion 1973 WCHA tournament champion 1973 NCAA National Champion; 1977 WCHA regular season champion 1977 WCHA tournament champion 1977 NCAA national champion 1978 WCHA tournament champion 1981 NCAA national champion 1982 WCHA tournament champion 1991 Stanley Cup

Awards
- 1977 WCHA Coach of the Year; 1987 Wisconsin Athletic Hall of Fame; 1991 United States Hockey Hall of Fame; 2000 Hobey Baker Legend of College Hockey Award

Robert Norman "Badger Bob" Johnson (March 4, 1931 – November 26, 1991) was an American college, international, and professional ice hockey coach. He coached the Wisconsin Badgers men's ice hockey team from 1966 to 1982, where he led the Badgers to seven appearances at the NCAA Men's Ice Hockey Championships, including three titles. During his time as the head coach at Wisconsin, Johnson also coached the United States men's national ice hockey team at the 1976 Winter Olympics and seven other major championships, including the Canada Cup and IIHF World Championships. He then coached the Calgary Flames for five seasons that included a Stanley Cup Final loss in 1986. Johnson achieved the peak of his professional coaching career in his only season as coach of the Pittsburgh Penguins in 1990–91, when the Penguins won the 1991 Stanley Cup Final, becoming the second American-born coach to win it and the first in 53 years. In August 1991, following hospitalization due to a brain aneurysm, Johnson was diagnosed with brain cancer. He died on November 26 of the same year.

He is the father of Olympic gold medalist and Wisconsin coach Mark Johnson.

Johnson was well known amongst players and fans for his enthusiasm and unflappable optimism, immortalized through his famous catchphrase "It's a great day for hockey!"

== Youth and amateur coaching career ==
Johnson was born in Minneapolis, Minnesota. He attended Minneapolis Central High School and the University of Minnesota, where he played hockey under legendary coach John Mariucci.

In 1956, he and Ken Johannson were hired by Warroad High School in northwestern Minnesota as teachers and coaches of the boys' hockey team. They had previously been roommates at the University of North Dakota, and neither knew the other was hired to run the team. He later coached hockey at Roosevelt High School in Minneapolis. He would teach his history class using a hockey stick as a pointer to the chalkboard. Johnson became the head hockey coach at Colorado College in 1963.

In 1966, Johnson moved to the University of Wisconsin–Madison, where he was head coach until 1982. He led the Badgers to seven NCAA tournaments, winning three championships in 1973, 1977, and 1981. It was at Wisconsin where Johnson earned the nickname, "Badger Bob."

Johnson also coached the 1976 Winter Olympic hockey team, the 1981, 1984, and 1987 U.S. teams in the Canada Cup tournament, and the 1973, 1974, 1975, and 1981 U.S. national teams.

== NHL coaching career ==
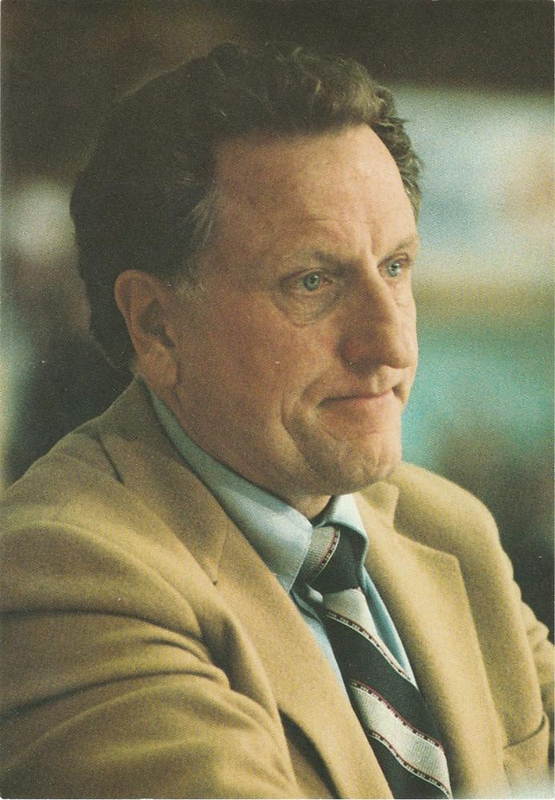
1982 postcard of Johnson as Calgary Flames coach

In 1982, Johnson began his National Hockey League career when he became the head coach of the Calgary Flames, a position he held for five seasons. In the 1985–86 season, he coached the Flames to the Stanley Cup Final, where they lost in five games to the Montreal Canadiens. On May 20, 1987, it was announced that Johnson would resign from the Flames to become the executive director of the Amateur Hockey Association of the United States (now commonly referred to as USA Hockey). He had two years remaining on his contract but felt that it was time to move on and that the Flames job was a "great job". He was 193-155-52 in Calgary. He served in the position for three years. On June 12, 1990, the Pittsburgh Penguins hired Johnson to serve as head coach while also naming Scotty Bowman as director of player development and recruitment. In his first season, led by superstar Mario Lemieux, the Penguins reached the postseason for only the second time in the past nine seasons. They advanced all the way to the Stanley Cup Final and faced the Minnesota North Stars. The Penguins lost two of the first three games before dominating the next three, which included an 8–0 victory in Game 6 to clinch the first Stanley Cup in franchise history.

=== Brain cancer and death ===
In August 1991, as he was preparing the U.S. team for the upcoming Canada Cup tournament, Johnson suffered a brain aneurysm and was hospitalized, where he was diagnosed with brain cancer. He was then flown on a private plane to Colorado with Dr. Dan Thompson of Mercy Hospital in Pittsburgh. He began treatment and turned the day-to-day supervision of the Penguins over to his three assistant coaches and Scotty Bowman, the team's director of player development and recruitment, who was named interim head coach. Though the team was "coached by committee", Johnson continued to oversee them from his hospital room by way of videotape and remained in contact by fax machine.

On November 26, 1991, Johnson died of brain cancer in Colorado Springs, Colorado. After his death, his catchphrase was emblazoned on a banner hanging over the ice at the University of Wisconsin–Madison and was painted at the bluelines on the ice in Pittsburgh's Civic Arena. In memoriam, it remained on the ice there for the remainder of the season. In addition, Penguins players would wear a patch on the left sleeve of their jerseys with the word "BADGER" under his birth and death years. Pittsburgh also put his name on the Stanley Cup a second time after their second straight Cup victory in 1992. "He's such a tremendous person...We would like to win it again for him," said Mark Recchi, a member of the team in 1991.

At the team's 1992 victory celebration at Three Rivers Stadium in Pittsburgh, Bowman's first remark was that "the coach of the Pittsburgh Penguins will always be – Bob Johnson".

The team used "A Great Day For Hockey" as their marketing slogan for the 2008–09 season. On June 12, 2009, exactly 19 years to the day of Johnson's hiring, the Pittsburgh Penguins won their third Stanley Cup. Furthermore, the Penguins won their fourth Stanley Cup, 26 years to the day that Johnson was hired, on June 12, 2016. "A Great Day For Hockey" now adorns the entrance of the PPG Paints Arena, the current home arena of the Penguins.

At the time of his death Johnson's 234 NHL victories were a record for an American born coach. Dan Bylsma, John Tortorella, Peter Laviolette and Mike Sullivan have since eclipsed this mark.

== Head coaching record ==
=== College ===
Record table
Season	Team	Overall	Conference	Standing	Postseason
Colorado College Tigers (WCHA) (1963–1966)
1963–64	Colorado College	11–14–1	4–11–1	6th	
1964–65	Colorado College	7–17–1	2–14–0	7th	
1965–66	Colorado College	9–18–2	4–12–2	7th	WCHA first round
Colorado College:		27–49–4	10–37–3		
Wisconsin Badgers Independent (1966–1969)
1966–67	Wisconsin	16–10–0			
1967–68	Wisconsin	21–10–0			
1968–69	Wisconsin	22–10–2			
Wisconsin:		59–30–2			
Wisconsin Badgers (WCHA) (1969–1975)
1969–70	Wisconsin	23–11–0	12–10–0	4th	NCAA consolation game (win)
1970–71	Wisconsin	20–13–1	13–9–0	3rd	WCHA East Regional semifinals
1971–72	Wisconsin	27–10–1	20–8–0	2nd	NCAA consolation game (win)
1972–73	Wisconsin	29–9–2	18–9–1	3rd	NCAA national champion
1973–74	Wisconsin	18–13–5	12–11–5	5th	WCHA first round
1974–75	Wisconsin	24–12–2	19–11–2	4th	WCHA first round
Wisconsin:		141–68–11	94–58–8		
Wisconsin Badgers (WCHA) (1976–1982)
1976–77	Wisconsin	37–7–1	26–5–1	1st	NCAA national champion
1977–78	Wisconsin	28–12–3	21–9–2	2nd	NCAA consolation game (loss)
1978–79	Wisconsin	25–13–3	19–11–2	4th	WCHA second round
1979–80	Wisconsin	15–20–1	12–18–0	9th	
1980–81	Wisconsin	27–14–1	17–11–0	t-2nd	NCAA national champion
1981–82	Wisconsin	35–11–1	18–7–1	2nd	NCAA runner-up
Wisconsin:		167–77–10	113–61–6		
Total:		394–224–27			
National champion Postseason invitational champion Conference regular season champion Conference regular season and conference tournament champion Division regular season champion Division regular season and conference tournament champion Conference tournament champion

=== NHL ===
Team	Year	Regular season						Postseason			
Team	Year	G	W	L	T	Pts	Finish	W	L	Win%	Result
CGY	1982-83	80	32	34	14	78	2nd in Smythe	4	5	.444	Lost in Division Finals (EDM)
CGY	1983-84	80	34	32	14	82	2nd in Smythe	6	5	.545	Lost in Division Finals (EDM)
CGY	1984-85	80	41	27	12	94	3rd in Smythe	1	3	.250	Lost in Division Semifinals (WPG)
CGY	1985-86	80	40	31	9	89	2nd in Smythe	12	10	.545	Lost in Stanley Cup Final (MTL)
CGY	1986-87	80	46	31	3	95	2nd in Smythe	2	4	.333	Lost in Division Semifinals (WPG)
CAL total		400	193	155	52			25	27	.481	5 playoff appearances
PIT	1990-91	80	41	33	6	88	1st in Patrick	16	8	.667	Won Stanley Cup (MNS)
PIT total		80	41	33	6	—		16	8	.667	1 Stanley Cup
Total		480	234	188	58			41	35	.539	6 playoff appearances 1 Stanley Cup title

== Honors ==
Johnson was inducted into the Wisconsin Hockey Hall of Fame in 1987, United States Hockey Hall of Fame in 1991, and the Hockey Hall of Fame in 1992. He was elected to the Wisconsin Athletic Hall of Fame in 1993. On November 2, 2012, the Wisconsin Badgers Men's Hockey team dedicated their home ice rink to Johnson, dubbing it "Bob Johnson Rink".

== Personal life ==
Johnson is also the father of 1980 Olympic hockey gold medalist and current Wisconsin women's hockey coach Mark Johnson and former Wisconsin assistant coach and Toronto Maple Leafs scout Peter Johnson. He is the grandfather of former Wisconsin hockey player Patrick Johnson, former Denver Pioneer hockey player Scott McConnell, Augsburg College men's assistant hockey coach Chris Johnson, women's hockey player Mikayla Johnson, and women's soccer player Meghan Johnson.

Johnson umpired baseball games in Minnesota with fellow hockey coach Dave Peterson.

== See also ==
- List of members of the United States Hockey Hall of Fame
- List of members of the Hockey Hall of Fame
- List of notable brain tumor patients
- Notable families in the NHL

Sporting positions
Preceded by Al MacNeil	Head coach of the Calgary Flames; 1982–87	Succeeded by Terry Crisp
Preceded by Craig Patrick	Head coach of the Pittsburgh Penguins; 1990–91	Succeeded by Scotty Bowman
Awards and achievements
Preceded by John MacInnes	WCHA Coach of the Year; 1976–77	Succeeded by Marshall Johnston
Preceded by John MacInnes/Glen Sonmor	Hobey Baker Legends of College Hockey Award; 2000	Succeeded by Bob Peters
