= Pinebridge Bucks =

The Pinebridge Bucks were a professional ice hockey team in Spruce Pine, North Carolina, and a member of the Atlantic Coast Hockey League from 1983 to 1985. Its colors were forest green, gold and maroon. Spruce Pine, with a population of just over 2,000 at the time, is the smallest city to host a professional hockey team in the modern era.

The Bucks played their home games in the Pinebridge Coliseum, where beer was unavailable for purchase during games due to Mitchell County's dry status at that time. The team was conceived by local investor Robert Bailey, a founder of Buck Stoves, hoping to spur tourism and wishful of filling dates in the new 5,000-seat Coliseum.

The Bucks finished fifth in the six-team league in the 1983–84 season with a 25–47–0 record. The Bucks improved to a third-place finish in its second year with a 33–25–6 record. In the playoffs, they lost to the Erie Golden Blades in six games. By this time, however, it was obvious that the area was too small for the team to be viable and it disbanded after the season.

The most noteworthy player in the team's short history was Ray LeBlanc, goaltender for the 1992 United States Olympic hockey team. Its leading scorer both seasons was Rob Clavette, the third leading scorer in ACHL history. Clavette, along with Frank Perkins, Steve Heittola, Kelly Rissling, and Tom Madson, were the only players to play games with the Bucks during both seasons.
