= Marc Behrend =

American ice hockey player (born 1961)

- Born: January 11, 1961 (age 65) Madison, Wisconsin
- Height: 6 ft 1 in (185 cm)
- Weight: 185 lb (84 kg; 13 st 3 lb)
- Position: Goaltender
- Caught: Left
- Played for: Winnipeg Jets
- National team: United States
- NHL draft: 85th overall, 1981; Winnipeg Jets
- Playing career: 1983–1987

Marc James Behrend (born January 11, 1961) is an American former professional ice hockey goaltender who played 39 National Hockey League (NHL) regular season games with the Winnipeg Jets between 1984 and 1986. He was drafted by the Jets with the 85th pick overall in the 1981 NHL entry draft.

== Playing career ==
Before turning professional, Behrend graduated from La Follette High School and was a member of the University of Wisconsin–Madison men's hockey team that won the NCAA championship in 1981 and 1983. Behrend was named the tournament's Most Outstanding Player on both occasions, becoming only the second player in the history of the tournament to do so. He is also the only goaltender to play in three consecutive NCAA finals (1981–1983). He also played for the United States national hockey team in the 1984 Winter Olympics in Sarajevo before turning professional.

== Post-playing career ==
After his hockey career, Behrend joined the City of Madison Fire Department where he worked as a 6th generation firefighter from 1988 to 2017.

== Career statistics ==
=== Regular season and playoffs ===
			Regular season									Playoffs
Season	Team	League	GP	W	L	T	MIN	GA	SO	GAA	SV%	GP	W	L	MIN	GA	SO	GAA	SV%
1980–81	University of Wisconsin	WCHA	16	11	4	1	913	50	0	3.29	.909	—	—	—	—	—	—	—	—
1981–82	University of Wisconsin	WCHA	25	21	3	1	1502	65	2	2.60	.908	—	—	—	—	—	—	—	—
1982–83	University of Wisconsin	WCHA	19	17	1	1	1315	49	2	2.24	.920	—	—	—	—	—	—	—	—
1983–84	Winnipeg Jets	NHL	6	2	4	0	349	32	0	5.50	.826	2	0	2	118	9	0	4.56	.897
1983–84	United States National Team	Intl	4	1	2	1	200	11	0	3.30	—	—	—	—	—	—	—	—	—
1984–85	Winnipeg Jets	NHL	24	8	10	3	1216	91	1	4.49	.864	4	1	1	177	9	0	3.05	.904
1984–85	Sherbrooke Canadiens	AHL	7	2	3	2	427	25	0	3.51	.897	—	—	—	—	—	—	—	—
1985–86	Winnipeg Jets	NHL	9	2	5	0	421	40	0	5.70	.817	1	0	0	12	0	0	0.00	1.000
1985–86	Sherbrooke Canadiens	AHL	35	16	5	2	2028	132	1	3.91	.879	—	—	—	—	—	—	—	—
1986–87	Sherbrooke Canadiens	AHL	19	8	5	0	1124	62	0	3.31	.892	1	0	1	59	3	0	3.05	—
NHL totals			39	12	19	3	1987	163	1	4.92	.848	7	1	3	308	18	0	3.51	.904

=== International ===
Year	Team	Event	GP	W	L	T	MIN	GA	SO	GAA	SV%
1984	United States	OLY	4	1	2	1	200	11	0	3.30	.896
Senior totals			4	1	2	1	200	11	0	3.30	.896

== Awards and honors ==
Award	Year
All-NCAA All-Tournament Team	1981, 1983
All-WCHA Second Team	1981–82

Awards and achievements
Preceded by Doug Smail; Phil Sykes	NCAA Tournament Most Outstanding Player; 1981; 1983	Succeeded by Phil Sykes; Gary Kruzich
