= Theran Welsh =

Canadian ice hockey player

- Born: February 25, 1958 (age 67); Prince Albert, Saskatchewan, Canada
- Height: 5 ft 7 in (170 cm)
- Weight: 170 lb (77 kg; 12 st 2 lb)
- Position: Defenseman
- Shot: Left
- Played for: Wisconsin; SaiPa; Oklahoma City Stars; KooKoo
- Playing career: 1977–1983

Theran Welsh is a Canadian retired ice hockey defenseman who was an All-American for Wisconsin.

== Career ==
Welsh played junior hockey for his home-town Prince Albert Raiders. He spent three years with the team, becoming captain in his final season. That year he helped the team win the Centennial Cup. Afterwards he accepted a scholarship to Wisconsin after the program had captured its second national title. In his first season with the Badgers, Welsh was an instant hit, scoring 55 points to lead the defense and helped Wisconsin return to the NCAA Tournament.

After a substandard year, Wisconsin produced the worst performance under Bob Johnson, finishing 9th in the WCHA (his only losing record). Despite the sharp decline, now-captain-Welsh continued to score at a high rate, ending with his third 55+ point season. He was named as an All-American and All-WCHA second team. The team recovered quickly in Welsh's senior season, finishing in a tie for second place in the WCHA. Welsh had another stellar offensive season, but the team suffered a terrible upset at the hands of Colorado College, losing a total-goal series after winning the first game 8–2. Fortunately, the NCAA had expanded the tournament field for 1981 and Wisconsin was given the final western seed as the WCHA was considered superior to the CCHA.

Derisively called the 'Back-Door Badgers', Wisconsin escaped a close series against Clarkson in the quarterfinals, winning the series 9–8 despite a nail-biting overtime session in the second game. After routing Northern Michigan in the semifinal, Wisconsin met Minnesota for the championship. Welsh assisted on Wisconsin's second goal as the Badgers opened up a 4-goal lead by the midway point of the game. The Gophers fought back valiantly but Wisconsin's lead was too much the team won its third national championship. Welsh's final assist was number 194 of his career, setting a new NCAA record for any position (he was later passed by current record holder Wayne Gagné). Welsh was also the all-time leading defenseman scorer for Wisconsin and sits 3rd all-time for all skaters as of 2021.

Being a relatively small player at just 5'7", Welsh had little opportunity to make the NHL and played parts of two seasons in Finland. He retired as a player in 1983 and went on to work for SVA as a Certified Public Accountant. He rose to position of Principle in the firm, a position he continues to hold as of 2021.

Welsh was inducted into the Prince Albert Wall of Honor in 2009 and the Wisconsin Athletic Hall of Fame in 2010.

== Statistics ==
=== Regular season and playoffs ===
			Regular Season					Playoffs
Season	Team	League	GP	G	A	Pts	PIM	GP	G	A	Pts	PIM
1973–74	Kinistino Tigers	NSJHL	—	—	—	—	—	—	—	—	—	—
1974–75	Prince Albert Raiders	SJHL	—	—	—	—	—	—	—	—	—	—
1975–76	Prince Albert Raiders	SJHL	—	—	—	—	—	—	—	—	—	—
1976–77	Prince Albert Raiders	SJHL	—	—	—	—	—	—	—	—	—	—
1976–77	Saskatoon Blades	WCHL	1	0	1	1	2	—	—	—	—	—
1977–78	Wisconsin	WCHA	43	10	45	55	28	—	—	—	—	—
1978–79	Wisconsin	WCHA	41	7	54	61	70	—	—	—	—	—
1979–80	Wisconsin	WCHA	36	7	51	58	24	—	—	—	—	—
1980–81	Wisconsin	WCHA	41	10	44	54	52	—	—	—	—	—
1981–82	SaiPa	SM-liiga	33	2	5	7	10	—	—	—	—	—
1981–82	Oklahoma City Stars	CHL	13	2	9	11	4	4	0	3	3	2
1982–83	KooKoo Kouvola	I-Divisioona	35	12	12	24	110	—	—	—	—	—
NCAA totals			161	34	194	228	174	—	—	—	—	—

== Awards and honors ==
Award	Year
All-WCHA Second Team	1979–80
AHCA West All-American	1979–80
All-WCHA Second Team	1980–81
