= John Newberry (ice hockey) =

Canadian ice hockey player

- Born: April 8, 1962 (age 64) Port Alberni, British Columbia, Canada
- Height: 6 ft 0 in (183 cm)
- Weight: 195 lb (88 kg; 13 st 13 lb)
- Position: Forward
- Shot: Left
- Played for: Montreal Canadiens; Hartford Whalers; Kärpät; EV Zug; Murrayfield Racers
- NHL draft: 45th overall, 1980; Montreal Canadiens
- Playing career: 1982–1993

John Newberry (born April 8, 1962) is a Canadian former professional ice hockey player. He played twenty-two games in the National Hockey League with the Montreal Canadiens and Hartford Whalers. He registered four assists.

Newberry was born in Port Alberni, British Columbia.

== Career statistics ==
			Regular season					Playoffs
Season	Team	League	GP	G	A	Pts	PIM	GP	G	A	Pts	PIM
1979–80	Nanaimo Clippers	BCJHL	65	84	101	185	96	—	—	—	—	—
1979–80	Victoria Cougars	WHL	1	0	2	2	0	2	0	0	0	0
1980–81	University of Wisconsin	NCAA	39	30	32	62	77	—	—	—	—	—
1981–82	University of Wisconsin	NCAA	39	28	27	65	42	—	—	—	—	—
1982–83	Montreal Canadiens	NHL	—	—	—	—	—	2	0	0	0	0
1982–83	Nova Scotia Voyageurs	AHL	71	29	29	58	43	6	3	1	4	2
1983–84	Montreal Canadiens	NHL	3	0	0	0	0	—	—	—	—	—
1983–84	Nova Scotia Voyageurs	AHL	78	25	37	62	116	12	7	12	19	22
1984–85	Montreal Canadiens	NHL	16	0	4	4	6	—	—	—	—	—
1984–85	Sherbrooke Canadiens	AHL	58	23	40	63	30	17	6	14	20	18
1985–86	Hartford Whalers	NHL	3	0	0	0	0	—	—	—	—	—
1985–86	Binghamton Whalers	AHL	21	6	11	17	38	—	—	—	—	—
1985–86	Moncton Golden Flames	AHL	44	10	24	34	31	9	1	4	5	2
1986–87	Kärpät	Liiga	39	16	14	30	63	9	3	4	7	17
1987–88	Västra Frölunda HC	Division 1	34	22	39	61	32	10	3	6	9	10
1988–89	Västra Frölunda HC	Division 1	33	24	22	46	32	11	5	5	10	8
1989–90	Örebro IK	Division 1	17	4	23	27	29	—	—	—	—	—
1989–90	EV Zug	NLA	10	8	5	13	4	2	1	0	1	6
1990–91	Uppsala AIS	Division 1	27	18	18	36	46	—	—	—	—	—
1991–92	Uppsala AIS	Division 1	29	10	25	35	46	—	—	—	—	—
1992–93	Murrayfield Racers	BHL	32	59	85	144	120	7	11	13	24	10
NHL totals			22	0	4	4	6	2	0	0	0	0
AHL totals			272	93	141	234	258	44	17	31	48	44

== Awards and honours ==
Award	Year
BCJHL - Vern Dye Memorial Trophy (most valuable player)	1979–80
All-NCAA All-Tournament Team	1981, 1982
All-WCHA First Team	1981–82
AHCA West All-American	1981–82
