= 1980–81 NCAA Division I men's ice hockey season =

- Duration: October 1980– March 28, 1981
- NCAA tournament: 1981
- National championship: Duluth Arena; Duluth, Minnesota
- NCAA champion: Wisconsin
- Hobey Baker Award: Neal Broten (Minnesota)

The 1980–81 NCAA Division I men's ice hockey season began in October 1980 and concluded with the 1981 NCAA Division I Men's Ice Hockey Tournament's championship game on March 28, 1981 at the Duluth Arena in Duluth, Minnesota. This was the 34th season in which an NCAA ice hockey championship was held and is the 87th year overall where an NCAA school fielded a team.

For the first time the Hobey Baker Award was conferred after the conclusion of the regular season.

After the season four teams from the WCHA left to join the CCHA. As a result of dividing the four Big Ten schools that had previously been in the WCHA the Big Ten stopped declaring a conference ice hockey champion until the formation of a separate conference in 2013–14.

== Season Outlook ==
=== Pre-season poll ===
The top teams in the nation voted on by coaches before the start of the season. The poll was compiled by radio station WMPL.

WMPL Poll
Rank	Team
1	Minnesota
2	Michigan Tech
3	Providence
4	Boston College
5	Wisconsin
6	North Dakota
7	Northern Michigan
8	Michigan
9 (tie)	Denver
9 (tie)	Minnesota Duluth

== Regular season ==
=== Season tournaments ===
Tournament	Dates	Teams	Champion
Elmira Invitational	November 14–15	4	St. Lawrence
North Country Thanksgiving Festival	November 27–29	4	Clarkson
Empire Cup	December 20–21	4	Colgate
I Love New York Tournament	November 22–24	4	St. Lawrence
Great Lakes Invitational	December 27–28	4	Michigan Tech
First National Hockey Tournament	December 27–29	4	Cornell
Western Michigan Tournament	December 28–29	4	Western Michigan
Rensselaer Holiday Tournament	December 28–30	4	Maine
Auld Lang Syne Classic	December 30–31	4	Dartmouth
Yale Invitational	January 2–3	4	North Dakota
Colonial Bank Hockey Invitational	January 3–4	4	Clarkson
Beanpot	February 2, 9	4	Harvard

=== Standings ===
1980–81 Big Ten standings
	Conference							Overall					
	GP	W	L	T	Pct.	GF	GA	GP	W	L	T	GF	GA
Minnesota†	10	9	1	0	.900	61	35	45	33	12	0	261	174
Wisconsin	10	5	5	0	.500	45	45	42	27	14	1	218	155
Michigan	12	4	8	0	.333	42	54	40	23	17	0	185	161
Michigan State	8	2	6	0	.250	23	37	36	12	22	2	116	144
† indicates conference regular season champion

1980–81 Central Collegiate Hockey Association standings
	Conference							Overall					
	GP	W	L	T	PTS	GF	GA	GP	W	L	T	GF	GA
Northern Michigan†*	22	18	4	0	36	115	81	44	27	14	3	201	158
Ohio State	22	15	6	1	31	107	82	39	24	12	3	189	149
Ferris State	22	13	9	0	26	101	92	36	20	14	2	166	144
Bowling Green	22	10	12	0	20	98	99	39	13	24	2	153	188
Western Michigan	22	8	13	1	17	99	107	36	15	19	2	178	165
Lake Superior State	22	6	15	1	13	101	134	36	14	21	1	183	202
Miami^	12	0	11	1	1	42	68	35	16	17	2	174	142
Championship: Northern Michigan † indicates conference regular season champion * indicates conference tournament champion^ Only Miami's road games were counted for conference standings

1980–81 ECAC Hockey standings
	Conference							Overall					
	GP	W	L	T	Pct.	GF	GA	GP	W	L	T	GF	GA
East Region
Boston College	22	13	6	3	.659	85	72	31	20	8	3	126	100
Maine	21	12	9	0	.571	101	93	34	23	11	0	197	147
Northeastern	21	12	9	0	.571	118	104	26	13	13	0	140	139
Providence*	22	12	9	1	.568	106	90	33	17	15	1	165	143
New Hampshire	24	13	10	1	.563	128	100	33	19	13	1	166	129
Boston University	22	10	12	0	.455	87	88	29	14	15	0	115	116
West Region
Clarkson†	20	17	2	1	.875	119	65	37	26	7	4	202	119
Colgate	20	12	7	1	.625	99	84	35	21	12	2	194	150
Rensselaer	21	10	11	0	.476	98	83	29	16	13	0	158	118
St. Lawrence	22	9	12	1	.432	77	87	33	15	16	2	137	126
Vermont	22	4	16	2	.227	81	114	34	9	23	2	136	173
Ivy Region
Cornell	22	12	9	1	.568	95	79	31	19	11	1	144	110
Yale	21	11	9	1	.548	96	101	26	13	12	1	127	137
Princeton	21	10	11	0	.476	78	99	25	12	13	0	93	111
Harvard	21	8	12	1	.405	79	98	26	11	14	1	103	119
Dartmouth	22	8	14	0	.364	87	115	26	10	16	0	100	138
Brown	22	3	18	1	.159	67	125	26	5	20	1	83	144
Independent
Army^	-	-	-	-	-	-	-	35	21	13	1	230	160
Championship: Providence † indicates conference regular season champion * indicates conference tournament champion^ Army had been accepted into ECAC Hockey but had not begun a conference schedule

1980–81 NCAA Division I Independent ice hockey standings
	Conference							Overall					
	GP	W	L	T	PTS	GF	GA	GP	W	L	T	GF	GA
Air Force	0	0	0	0	-	-	-	26	13	13	0	103	128
Kent State	0	0	0	0	-	-	-	35	17	18	0		
US International	0	0	0	0	-	-	-	21	8	13	0		

1980–81 Western Collegiate Hockey Association standings
	Conference							Overall					
	GP	W	L	T	PTS	GF	GA	GP	W	L	T	GF	GA
Minnesota†*	28	20	8	0	40	152	104	45	33	12	0	261	174
Wisconsin	28	17	11	0	34	131	101	42	27	14	1	218	155
Michigan Tech*	28	17	11	0	34	118	102	44	29	14	1	195	155
Denver	28	15	11	2	32	120	111	40	23	15	2	233	197
Michigan	28	15	13	0	30	138	122	40	23	17	0	185	161
North Dakota	28	14	12	2	30	133	134	38	21	15	2	186	168
Colorado College	28	12	16	0	24	128	142	36	17	19	0	174	183
Minnesota-Duluth	28	11	17	0	22	120	150	39	17	21	1	165	197
Notre Dame	28	9	18	1	19	100	137	36	13	21	2	139	166
Michigan State	28	7	20	1	15	82	119	36	12	22	2	116	144
Championship: Michigan Tech, Minnesota † indicates conference regular season champion * indicates conference tournament champion

=== Final regular season polls ===
The final top 10 teams as ranked by coaches (WMPL) before the conference tournament finals.

WMPL Coaches Poll
Ranking	Team
1	Minnesota
2	Clarkson
3	Wisconsin
3 (tie)	Michigan Tech
5	Northern Michigan
6	Denver
7	Boston College
8	North Dakota
9	Colgate
10	Michigan
10 (tie)	New Hampshire

== 1981 NCAA Tournament ==
Quarterfinals; March 19–21
E1	Clarkson	2	6	8
W4	Wisconsin	3	6	9
W2	Northern Michigan	7	3	10
E3	Cornell	3	4	7
W1	Minnesota	9	5	14
E4	Colgate	4	4	8
E2	Providence	3	5	8
W3	Michigan Tech	7	6	13

Semifinals; March 25–26
W4	Wisconsin	5
W2	Northern Michigan	1
W1	Minnesota	7
W3	Michigan Tech	2

National championship March 27
W4	Wisconsin	6
W1	Minnesota	3
Third-place game
W2	Northern Michigan	2
W3	Michigan Tech	5

Note: * denotes overtime period(s)

== Player stats ==
=== Scoring leaders ===
The following players led the league in points at the conclusion of the season.

GP = Games played; G = Goals; A = Assists; Pts = Points; PIM = Penalty minutes

Player	Class	Team	GP	G	A	Pts	PIM
Aaron Broten	Sophomore	Minnesota	45	47	59	106	24
Steve Ulseth	Senior	Minnesota	45	41	52	93	18
Steve Bozek	Junior	Northern Michigan	44	35	55	90	46
Jeff Pyle	Junior	Northern Michigan	40	35	53	88	20
Bryan Erickson	Sophomore	Minnesota	44	39	47	86	30
Troy Murray	Freshman	North Dakota	38	33	45	78	28
Scott Lecy	Senior	Wisconsin	42	26	49	75	44
Ross Fitzpatrick	Junior	Western Michigan	36	28	43	71	22
Neal Broten	Sophomore	Minnesota	36	17	54	71	56
Dan Fridgen	Junior	Colgate	33	37	31	68	164
Bryan Cleaver	Senior	Clarkson	37	24	44	68	38

=== Leading goaltenders ===
The following goaltenders led the league in goals against average at the end of the regular season while playing at least 33% of their team's total minutes.

GP = Games played; Min = Minutes played; W = Wins; L = Losses; OT = Overtime/shootout losses; GA = Goals against; SO = Shutouts; SV% = Save percentage; GAA = Goals against average

Player	Class	Team	GP	Min	W	L	OT	GA	SO	SV%	GAA
Don Sylvestri	Freshman	Clarkson	29	1740	22	3	4	84	2	.904	2.92
Gary Laskoski	Junior	St. Lawrence	21	1196	10	10	1	64	0	.895	3.21
Frank Krieber	Senior	Michigan Tech	28	1701	-	-	-	91	1	.895	3.21
Jeff Poeschl	Freshman	Northern Michigan	32	1855	20	9	2	101	1	.895	3.27
Marc Behrend	Sophomore	Wisconsin	16	913	11	4	1	50	0	.909	3.29
Alain Chevrier	Freshman	Miami	19	1053	8	10	1	73	0	-	3.40
Darren Eliot	Sophomore	Cornell	18	912	8	7	0	52	1	.908	3.42
Scott Robinson	Junior	Denver	31	1885	17	12	2	110	0	.882	3.50
Mike Blake	Senior	Ohio State	37	2098	22	9	3	125	2	.896	3.57
Brian Hayward	Junior	Cornell	19	967	11	4	1	58	1	.904	3.60

== Awards ==
=== NCAA ===
Award		Recipient
Hobey Baker Memorial Award		Neal Broten, Minnesota
Spencer Penrose Award		Bill O'Flaherty, Clarkson
Most Outstanding Player in NCAA Tournament		Marc Behrend, Wisconsin
AHCA All-American Teams
East Team	Position	West Team
Don Sylvestri, Clarkson	G	Paul Fricker, Michigan
Mark Fusco, Harvard	D	Marc Chorney, North Dakota
Ed Small, Clarkson	D	Tim Watters, Michigan Tech
Sandy Beadle, Northeastern	F	Steve Bozek, Northern Michigan
Bryan Cleaver, Clarkson	F	Neal Broten, Minnesota
Gary Conn, Maine	F	Aaron Broten, Minnesota

=== CCHA ===
Awards		Recipient
Player of the Year		Jeff Pyle, Northern Michigan
Rookie of the Year		Jeff Poeschl, Northern Michigan
		Paul Pooley, Ohio State
Coach of the Year		Rick Comley, Northern Michigan
All-CCHA Teams
First Team	Position	Second Team
Mike Blake, Ohio State	G	Jeff Poeschl, Northern Michigan
Dan Mandich, Ohio State	D	
Jim File, Ferris State	D	
George Harrison, Ferris State	D	
Brent Morrow, Ohio State	D	
Jeff Pyle, Northern Michigan	F	Paul Pooley, Ohio State
Steve Bozek, Northern Michigan	F	George McPhee, Bowling Green
Ross Fitzpatrick, Western Michigan	F	Brian Hills, Bowling Green

=== ECAC ===
Award		Recipient
Player of the Year		Ed Small, Clarkson
Rookie of the Year		Don Sylvestri, Clarkson
Most Outstanding Player in Tournament		Kurt Kleinendorst, Providence
All-ECAC Hockey Teams
First Team	Position	Second Team
Don Sylvestri, Clarkson	G	Jeff Nord, Maine
Ed Small, Clarkson	D	Chris Renaud, Colgate
Mark Fusco, Harvard	D	Andre Aubut, Maine
Bryan Cleaver, Clarkson	F	Billy O'Dwyer, Boston College
Gary Conn, Maine	F	Steve Cruickshank, Clarkson
Sandy Beadle, Northeastern	F	Dan Fridgen, Colgate

=== WCHA ===
Award		Recipient
Most Valuable Player		Steve Ulseth, Minnesota
Freshman of the Year		Ron Scott, Michigan State
Coach of the Year		John Giordano, Michigan
All-WCHA Teams
First Team	Position	Second Team
Ron Scott, Michigan State	G	Paul Fricker, Michigan
Marc Chorney, North Dakota	D	John Blum, Michigan
Tim Watters, Michigan Tech	D	Theran Welsh, Wisconsin
Steve Ulseth, Minnesota	F	Ken Berry, Denver
Neal Broten, Minnesota	F	Bruce Aikens, Colorado College
Aaron Broten, Minnesota	F	Troy Murray, North Dakota

== 1981 NHL entry draft ==
Round	Pick	Player	College	Conference	NHL team
1	9	James Patrick ^{†}	North Dakota	WCHA	New York Rangers
2	27	Dave Donnelly ^{†}	North Dakota	WCHA	Minnesota North Stars
2	33	Tom Hirsch ^{†}	Minnesota	WCHA	Minnesota North Stars
2	34	David Preuss ^{†}	Minnesota	WCHA	Minnesota North Stars
2	37	Rich Costello ^{†}	Providence	ECAC Hockey	Philadelphia Flyers
2	40	Chris Chelios ^{†}	Wisconsin	WCHA	Montreal Canadiens
4	64	Kirk McCaskill	Vermont	ECAC Hockey	Winnipeg Jets
4	68	Anthony Kellin ^{†}	Minnesota	WCHA	Washington Capitals
4	71	Paul Houck ^{†}	Wisconsin	WCHA	Edmonton Oilers
4	76	James Malwitz ^{†}	Minnesota	WCHA	Minnesota North Stars
4	81	Marty Dallman	Rensselaer	ECAC Hockey	Los Angeles Kings
5	85	Marc Behrend	Wisconsin	WCHA	Winnipeg Jets
5	88	Steve Rooney ^{†}	Providence	ECAC Hockey	Montreal Canadiens
5	95	Ed Lee	Princeton	ECAC Hockey	Quebec Nordiques
6	106	Bob O'Connor	Boston College	ECAC Hockey	Winnipeg Jets
6	108	Bruce Driver	Wisconsin	WCHA	Colorado Rockies
6	114	Eric Magnuson	Rensselaer	ECAC Hockey	New York Rangers
6	117	Bill Schafhauser	Northern Michigan	CCHA	Chicago Black Hawks
6	118	Paul Guay ^{†}	Providence	ECAC Hockey	Minnesota North Stars
6	119	Bruce Milton	Boston University	ECAC Hockey	Boston Bruins
6	124	Tom Anastos ^{†}	Michigan State	WCHA	Montreal Canadiens
7	135	Mike Guentzel ^{†}	Minnesota	WCHA	New York Rangers
7	139	Jim Archibald ^{†}	North Dakota	WCHA	Minnesota North Stars
7	141	Rick Heppner ^{†}	Wisconsin	WCHA	Calgary Flames
7	143	Dan McFall ^{†}	Michigan State	WCHA	Winnipeg Jets
7	144	Peter Sawkins ^{†}	Yale	ECAC Hockey	Los Angeles Kings
7	145	Tom Kurvers	Minnesota–Duluth	WCHA	Montreal Canadiens
8	149	Rick Zombo ^{†}	North Dakota	WCHA	Detroit Red Wings
8	163	Steve Taylor	Providence	ECAC Hockey	Philadelphia Flyers
8	164	Gaetano Orlando	Providence	ECAC Hockey	Buffalo Sabres
8	165	Dan Brennan	North Dakota	WCHA	Los Angeles Kings
8	166	Paul Gess ^{†}	Lake Superior State	CCHA	Montreal Canadiens
9	171	Tim Army	Providence	ECAC Hockey	Colorado Rockies
9	172	Jeff Poeschl	Northern Michigan	CCHA	Hartford Whalers
9	173	George White	New Hampshire	ECAC Hockey	Washington Capitals
9	177	Paul Reifenberger ^{†}	Western Michigan	CCHA	New York Rangers
9	181	Scott Bjugstad	Minnesota	WCHA	Minnesota North Stars
9	182	Don Sylvestri	Clarkson	ECAC Hockey	Boston Bruins
9	183	George Boudreau ^{†}	Boston College	ECAC Hockey	Calgary Flames
9	187	Scott Ferguson ^{†}	Colorado College	WCHA	Montreal Canadiens
10	192	John Johannson	Wisconsin	WCHA	Colorado Rockies
10	197	Gord Sherven ^{†}	North Dakota	WCHA	Edmonton Oilers
10	198	Mario Proulx	Providence	ECAC Hockey	New York Rangers
10	202	Steve Kudebeh ^{†}	Rensselaer	ECAC Hockey	Minnesota North Stars
10	204	Bruce Eakin ^{‡}	Wisconsin	WCHA	Detroit Red Wings
10	206	Warren Harper ^{†}	Michigan State	WCHA	Buffalo Sabres
10	207	Jeff Baikie	Cornell	ECAC Hockey	Los Angeles Kings
10	210	Dave Randerson ^{†}	Bowling Green	CCHA	New York Islanders

† incoming freshman
‡ Eakin had left school during the season

== See also ==
- 1980–81 NCAA Division II men's ice hockey season
- 1980–81 NCAA Division III men's ice hockey season
