= List of Minnesota Golden Gophers men's ice hockey seasons =

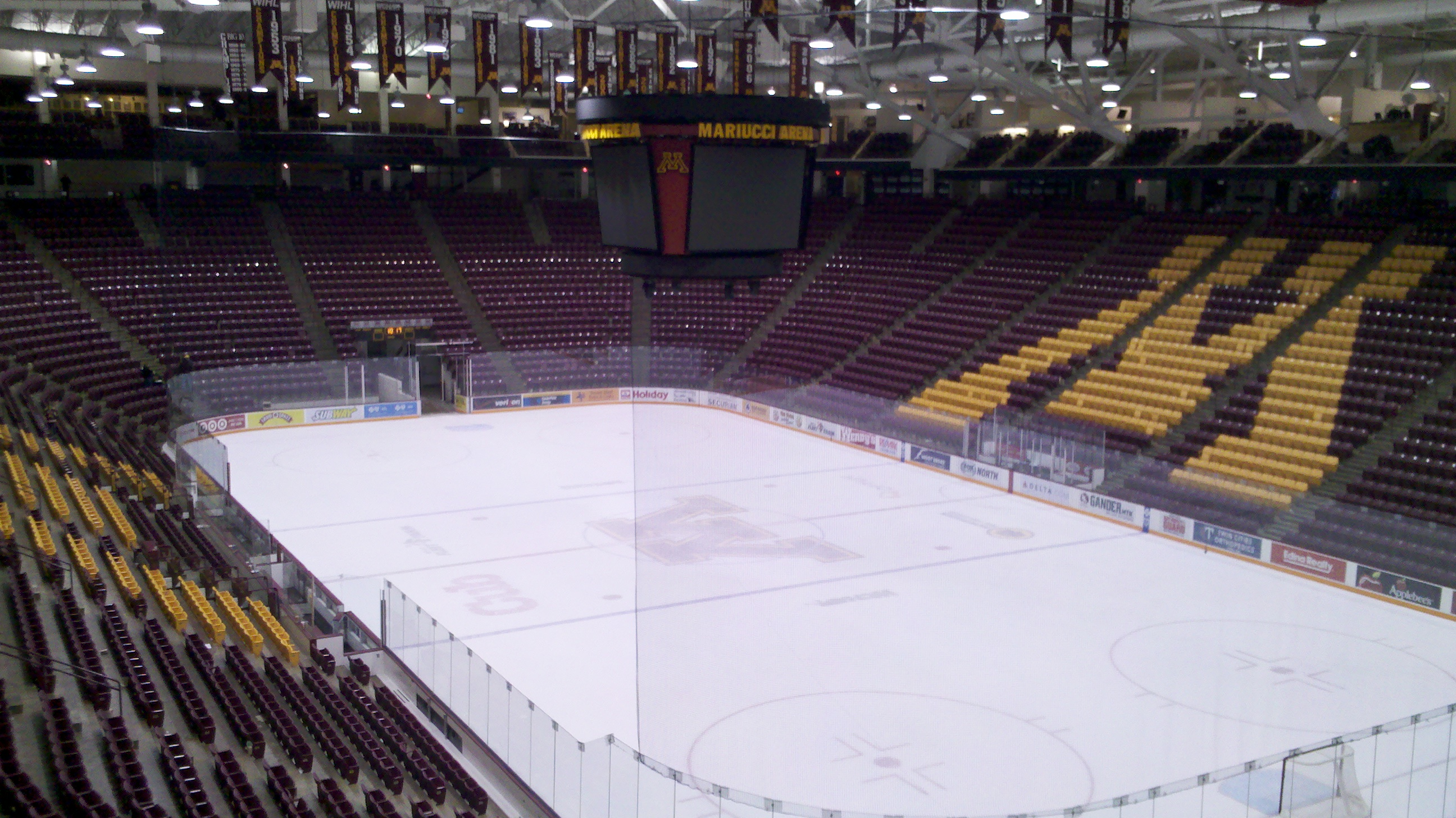
3M Arena at Mariucci, home arena of the Golden Gophers men's hockey team since 1993

This is a list of seasons completed by the University of Minnesota Golden Gophers men's ice hockey team. The list documents the season-by-season records of the Golden Gophers from 1921 to present, including postseason records, and league awards for individual players or head coaches.

Minnesota has won five NCAA Men's Division I Ice Hockey Championships (1974, 1976, 1979, 2002, 2003) and has been the runner-up eight times (1953, 1954, 1971, 1975, 1981, 1989, 2014, 2023). The team also shared the 1929 National Intercollegiate Athletic Association championship with Yale and won the 1940 AAU-sponsored national championship for amateur hockey. In their 100+ year history, the Gophers have won more games than any other program. The Gophers have made an NCAA-leading 40 NCAA postseason appearances since tournament play began in 1948. Their 23 Frozen Four appearances are bettered by two teams: the University of Michigan and Boston College. Minnesota is also one of only five teams to win consecutive national titles (the others being Boston University, University of Denver, University of Michigan and Minnesota-Duluth). The Golden Gophers have been named the WCHA's regular season champion fourteen times, its tournament champion fourteen times, the Big Ten Hockey Conference's regular season champion eight times, and its conference tournament champion twice.

== Season-by-season results ==
Note: GP = Games played, W = Wins, L = Losses, T = Ties

AAU/NCAA D-I Champions	NCAA Frozen Four	Conference regular season champions	Conference Playoff Champions

Season	Conference	Regular season (Note: Code explanation; GP—Games Played, W—Wins, L—Losses, T—Tied games, OTW—Overtime Wins, OTL—Overtime Loses, 3/SW—Win in 3 on 3 overtime or shootout, Pts—Points*)														Conference Tournament Results	National Tournament Results
Season	Conference	Conference									Overall					Conference Tournament Results	National Tournament Results
Season	Conference	GP	W	L	T	OTW	OTL	3/SW	Pts*	Finish	GP	W	L	T	%	Conference Tournament Results	National Tournament Results
I. D. MacDonald (1921–1922)
1921–22	Independent	–	–	–	–	–	–	–	–	–	10	6	3	1	.650		
Emil Iverson (1922–1930)
1922–23	Independent	–	–	–	–	–	–	–	–	–	12	10	1	1	.875		
1923–24	Independent	–	–	–	–	–	–	–	–	–	14	13	1	0	.929		
1924–25	Independent	–	–	–	–	–	–	–	–	–	10	8	1	1	.850		
1925–26	Independent	–	–	–	–	–	–	–	–	–	16	12	0	4	.875		
1926–27	Independent	–	–	–	–	–	–	–	–	–	15	9	6	0	.600		
1927–28	Independent	–	–	–	–	–	–	–	–	–	13	9	2	2	.769		
1928–29	Independent	–	–	–	–	–	–	–	–	–	17	14	2	1	.853		
1929–30	Independent	–	–	–	–	–	–	–	–	–	18	7	9	2	.444		
Frank Pond (1930–1935)
1930–31	Independent	–	–	–	–	–	–	–	–	–	19	7	11	1	.395		
1931–32	Independent	–	–	–	–	–	–	–	–	–	16	12	3	1	.781		
1932–33	Independent	–	–	–	–	–	–	–	–	–	11	10	1	0	.909		
1933–34	Independent	–	–	–	–	–	–	–	–	–	14	11	3	0	.786		
1934–35	Independent	–	–	–	–	–	–	–	–	–	17	9	6	2	.588		
Larry Armstrong (1935–1947)
1935–36	Independent	–	–	–	–	–	–	–	–	–	16	10	6	0	.625		
1936–37	Independent	–	–	–	–	–	–	–	–	–	16	11	4	1	.719		
1937–38	Independent	–	–	–	–	–	–	–	–	–	17	7	9	1	.441		
1938–39	Independent	–	–	–	–	–	–	–	–	–	23	17	6	0	.739		Won in AAU Quarterfinals, 10–1 (Philadelphia); Won in AAU Semifinals, 3–2 (St. Nicholas); Lost in AAU Championship, 3–4 (Cleveland)
1939–40	Independent	–	–	–	–	–	–	–	–	–	18	18	0	0	1.000		Won in AAU Semifinals, 9–4 (Amesbury); Won AAU Championship, 9–1 (Brock Hall)
1940–41	Independent	–	–	–	–	–	–	–	–	–	16	11	3	2	.750		
1941–42	Independent	–	–	–	–	–	–	–	–	–	12	7	5	0	.583		
1942–43	Independent	–	–	–	–	–	–	–	–	–	16	10	5	1	.656		
1943–44	Independent	–	–	–	–	–	–	–	–	–	11	6	5	0	.545		
1944–45	Independent	–	–	–	–	–	–	–	–	–	10	7	2	1	.750		
1945–46	Independent	–	–	–	–	–	–	–	–	–	14	9	4	1	.679		
1946–47	Independent	–	–	–	–	–	–	–	–	–	20	12	5	3	.675		
Elwin Romnes (1947–1952)
1947–48	Independent	–	–	–	–	–	–	–	–	–	21	9	12	0	.429		
1948–49	Independent	–	–	–	–	–	–	–	–	–	23	12	11	0	.522		
1949–50	Independent	–	–	–	–	–	–	–	–	–	16	5	11	0	.313		
1950–51	Independent	–	–	–	–	–	–	–	–	–	26	14	12	0	.538		
1951–52	MCHL	12	5	7	0	–	–	–	10	5th	26	13	13	0	.500		
John Mariucci (1952–1955)
1952–53	MCHL	20	16	4	0	–	–	–	19	T–1st	29	23	6	0	.793		Won Semifinal, 3–2 (Rensselaer); Lost Championship, 3–7 (Michigan)
1953–54	WIHL	20	16	3	1	–	–	–	20½	1st	30	23	6	1	.783		Won Semifinal, 14–1 (Boston College); Lost Championship, 4–5 (OT) (Rensselaer)
1954–55	WIHL	24	10	12	2	–	–	–	11	3rd	30	16	12	2	.567		
Marsh Ryman (1955–1956)
1955–56	WIHL	22	11	10	1	–	–	–	12	4th	29	16	12	1	.569		
John Mariucci (1956–1966)
1956–57	WIHL	24	7	15	0	–	–	–	8	6th	29	12	15	2	.429		
1957–58	WIHL	24	13	11	0	–	–	–	13	4th	27	16	11	0	.593		
1958–59	Big Ten	8	4	3	1	–	–	–	9	2nd	24	12	10	2	.542		
1959–60	Big Ten	8	5	3	0	–	–	–	10	1st	27	9	16	2	.370		
1959–60	WCHA	24	8	15	1	–	–	–	.354	6th	27	9	16	2	.370		
1960–61	Big Ten	8	5	3	0	–	–	–	10	2nd	29	17	11	1	.603	Won WCHA Final series, 6–4 (Michigan)	Lost Semifinal, 1–6 (Denver); Won Third-place game, 4–3 (Rensselaer)
1960–61	WCHA	20	14	6	0	–	–	–	.700	2nd	29	17	11	1	.603	Won WCHA Final series, 6–4 (Michigan)	Lost Semifinal, 1–6 (Denver); Won Third-place game, 4–3 (Rensselaer)
1961–62	Big Ten	4	0	3	1	–	–	–	.125	3rd	21	9	10	2	.476		
1961–62	WCHA	16	5	10	1	–	–	–	.344	6th	21	9	10	2	.476		
1962–63	Big Ten	8	5	1	2	–	–	–	12	1st	29	16	9	4	.621	Lost WCHA Semifinal series, 2–9 (Denver)	
1962–63	WCHA	20	10	7	3	–	–	–	.575	4th	29	16	9	4	.621	Lost WCHA Semifinal series, 2–9 (Denver)	
1963–64	Big Ten	8	5	3	0	–	–	–	10	2nd	25	14	11	0	.560		
1963–64	WCHA	16	10	6	0	–	–	–	.625	3rd	25	14	11	0	.560		
University Division
1964–65	Big Ten	8	5	3	0	–	–	–	10	1st	28	14	12	2	.536	Lost WCHA first round series, 7–11 (Michigan Tech)	
1964–65	WCHA	18	10	8	0	–	–	–	.556	3rd	28	14	12	2	.536	Lost WCHA first round series, 7–11 (Michigan Tech)	
1965–66	Big Ten	8	5	3	0	–	–	–	10	1st	27	16	11	0	.593	Lost WCHA first round, 3–4 (North Dakota)	
1965–66	WCHA	22	13	9	0	–	–	–	.591	T–2nd	27	16	11	0	.593	Lost WCHA first round, 3–4 (North Dakota)	
Glen Sonmor (1966–1971)
1966–67	Big Ten	8	2	5	1	–	–	–	5	3rd	29	9	19	1	.328	Lost WCHA first round, 2–7 (North Dakota)	
1966–67	WCHA	23	5	17	1	–	–	–	.239	8th	29	9	19	1	.328	Lost WCHA first round, 2–7 (North Dakota)	
1967–68	Big Ten	8	3	5	0	–	–	–	6	2nd	31	19	12	0	.613	Won WCHA first round, 5–3 (Michigan); Lost WCHA Final series, 3–16 (Denver)	
1967–68	WCHA	22	13	9	0	–	–	–	.591	5th	31	19	12	0	.613	Won WCHA first round, 5–3 (Michigan); Lost WCHA Final series, 3–16 (Denver)	
1968–69	Big Ten	10	4	5	1	–	–	–	.450	3rd	29	13	13	3	.517	Lost WCHA regional semifinal, 4–8 (Michigan)	
1968–69	WCHA	22	11	9	2	–	–	–	.545	4th	29	13	13	3	.517	Lost WCHA regional semifinal, 4–8 (Michigan)	
1969–70	Big Ten	12	8	4	0	–	–	–	16	1st	33	21	12	0	.636	Won WCHA regional semifinal, 3–2 (OT) (Minnesota–Duluth); Lost WCHA Regional final, 5–6 (Michigan Tech)	
1969–70	WCHA	26	18	8	0	–	–	–	.692	1st	33	21	12	0	.636	Won WCHA regional semifinal, 3–2 (OT) (Minnesota–Duluth); Lost WCHA Regional final, 5–6 (Michigan Tech)	
1970–71	Big Ten	10	5	5	0	–	–	–	.500	3rd	32	14	17	1	.453	Won WCHA regional semifinal, 4–3 (Wisconsin); Won WCHA Regional final, 5–2 (North Dakota)	Won Semifinal, 6–5 (OT) (Harvard); Lost Championship, 2–4 (Boston University)
1970–71	WCHA	22	9	12	1	–	–	–	.432	5th	32	14	17	1	.453	Won WCHA regional semifinal, 4–3 (Wisconsin); Won WCHA Regional final, 5–2 (North Dakota)	Won Semifinal, 6–5 (OT) (Harvard); Lost Championship, 2–4 (Boston University)
Ken Yackel (1971–1972)
1971–72	Big Ten	10	4	6	0	–	–	–	8	4th	32†	8†	24†	0†	.250		
1971–72	WCHA	28	7	21	0	–	–	–	14	10th	32†	8†	24†	0†	.250		
Herb Brooks (1972–1979)
1972–73	Big Ten	12	5	4	1	–	–	–	13	3rd	34	15	16	3	.485	Lost WCHA first round series, 10–14 (Wisconsin)	
1972–73	WCHA	28	12	13	3	–	–	–	35	6th	34	15	16	3	.485	Lost WCHA first round series, 10–14 (Wisconsin)	
Division I
1973–74	Big Ten	12	5	4	3	–	–	–	13	T–1st	39	22	11	6	.641	Won WCHA first round series, 10–5 (Michigan); Won WCHA second round series, 5–4 (Denver)	Won Semifinal, 5–4 (Boston University); Won Championship, 4–2 (Michigan Tech)
1973–74	WCHA	28	14	9	5	–	–	–	33	2nd	39	22	11	6	.641	Won WCHA first round series, 10–5 (Michigan); Won WCHA second round series, 5–4 (Denver)	Won Semifinal, 5–4 (Boston University); Won Championship, 4–2 (Michigan Tech)
1974–75	Big Ten	12	8	4	0	–	–	–	16	1st	42	31	10	1	.750	Won WCHA first round series, 10–2 (Minnesota–Duluth); Won WCHA second round series, 8–5 (Michigan)	Won Semifinal, 6–4 (Harvard); Lost Championship, 1–6 (Michigan Tech)
1974–75	WCHA	32	24	8	0	–	–	–	48	1st	42	31	10	1	.750	Won WCHA first round series, 10–2 (Minnesota–Duluth); Won WCHA second round series, 8–5 (Michigan)	Won Semifinal, 6–4 (Harvard); Lost Championship, 1–6 (Michigan Tech)
1975–76	Big Ten	12	4	8	0	–	–	–	8	3rd	44	28	14	2	.659	Won WCHA first round series, 12–5 (Colorado College); Won WCHA second round series, 9–8 (Michigan State)	Won Semifinal, 4–2 (Boston University); Won Championship, 6–4 (Michigan Tech)
1975–76	WCHA	32	18	13	1	–	–	–	37	3rd	44	28	14	2	.659	Won WCHA first round series, 12–5 (Colorado College); Won WCHA second round series, 9–8 (Michigan State)	Won Semifinal, 4–2 (Boston University); Won Championship, 6–4 (Michigan Tech)
1976–77	Big Ten	12	5	7	0	–	–	–	10	3rd	41	17	21	3	.451	Won WCHA first round series, 10–7 (Notre Dame); Lost WCHA Semifinal series, 8–17 (Wisconsin)	
1976–77	WCHA	32	13	16	3	–	–	–	29	7th	41	17	21	3	.451	Won WCHA first round series, 10–7 (Notre Dame); Lost WCHA Semifinal series, 8–17 (Wisconsin)	
1977–78	Big Ten	12	6	6	0	–	–	–	12	3rd	38	22	14	2	.605	Lost WCHA first round series, 7–8 (Colorado College)	
1977–78	WCHA	32	18	13	1	–	–	–	37	4th	38	22	14	2	.605	Lost WCHA first round series, 7–8 (Colorado College)	
1978–79	Big Ten	12	10	2	0	–	–	–	20	1st	44	32	11	1	.739	Won WCHA first round series, 11–4 (Michigan Tech); Won WCHA second round series, 8–4 (Minnesota–Duluth)	Won First round, 6–3 (Bowling Green); Won Semifinal, 4–3 (New Hampshire); Won Championship, 4–3 (North Dakota)
1978–79	WCHA	32	20	11	1	–	–	–	41	2nd	44	32	11	1	.739	Won WCHA first round series, 11–4 (Michigan Tech); Won WCHA second round series, 8–4 (Minnesota–Duluth)	Won First round, 6–3 (Bowling Green); Won Semifinal, 4–3 (New Hampshire); Won Championship, 4–3 (North Dakota)
Brad Buetow (1979–1985)
1979–80	Big Ten	12	8	4	0	–	–	–	16	1st	41	26	15	0	.634	Won WCHA first round series, 13–5 (Michigan Tech); Won WCHA second round series, 13–4 (Colorado College)	Lost First round, 3–4 (Northern Michigan)
1979–80	WCHA	32	18	14	0	–	–	–	.563	2nd	41	26	15	0	.634	Won WCHA first round series, 13–5 (Michigan Tech); Won WCHA second round series, 13–4 (Colorado College)	Lost First round, 3–4 (Northern Michigan)
1980–81	Big Ten	10	9	1	0	–	–	–	.900	1st	45	33	12	0	.733	Won WCHA first round series, 10–8 (Minnesota–Duluth); Won WCHA second round series, 14–10 (Colorado College)	Won Quarterfinal series, 14–8 (Colgate); Won Semifinal, 7–2 (Michigan Tech); Lost Championship, 3–6 (Wisconsin)
1980–81	WCHA	28	20	8	0	–	–	–	40	1st	45	33	12	0	.733	Won WCHA first round series, 10–8 (Minnesota–Duluth); Won WCHA second round series, 14–10 (Colorado College)	Won Quarterfinal series, 14–8 (Colgate); Won Semifinal, 7–2 (Michigan Tech); Lost Championship, 3–6 (Wisconsin)
1981–82	WCHA	26	13	11	2	–	–	–	28	3rd	36	22	12	2	.639	Won First round series, 9–4 (Colorado College); Lost Semifinal series, 5–9 (North Dakota)	
1982–83	WCHA	26	18	7	1	–	–	–	37	1st	45	32	12	1	.722	Won Semifinal series, 11–6 (Minnesota–Duluth); Lost Championship series, 3–8 (Wisconsin)	Won Quarterfinal series, 16–8 (New Hampshire); Lost Semifinal, 3–5 (Harvard); Lost Third-place game, 3–4 (Providence)
1983–84	WCHA	26	16	9	1	–	–	–	.635	3rd	40	27	11	2	.700	Won First round series, 7–2 (Colorado College); Lost Semifinal series, 7–9 (North Dakota)	
1984–85	WCHA	34	21	10	3	–	–	–	45	2nd	47	31	13	3	.691	Won First round series, 9–8 (Northern Michigan); Won Semifinal series, 14–7 (Wisconsin); Lost Championship series, 8–10 (Minnesota–Duluth)	Lost Quarterfinal series, 8–9 (Boston College)
Doug Woog (1985–1999)
1985–86	WCHA	34	24	10	0	–	–	–	48	2nd	48	35	13	0	.729	Won First round series, 14–7 (Colorado College); Won Semifinal series, 11–4 (Wisconsin); Lost Championship series, 2–6 (Denver)	Won Quarterfinal series, 11–7 (Boston University); Lost Semifinal, 4–6 (Michigan State); Won Third-place game, 6–4 (Denver)
1986–87	WCHA	35	25	9	1	–	–	–	51	2nd	49	34	14	1	.704	Won First round series, 17–9 (Michigan Tech); Won Semifinal series, 9–6 (Wisconsin); Lost Championship series, 6–10 (North Dakota)	Won Quarterfinal series, 6–4 (Boston College); Lost Semifinal, 3–5 (Michigan State); Won Third-place game, 6–3 (Harvard)
1987–88	WCHA	35	28	7	0	–	–	–	56	1st	44	34	10	0	.773	Won First round series, 2–0 (Colorado College); Won Semifinal, 6–1 (Minnesota–Duluth); Lost Championship, 2–3 (Wisconsin)	Won Quarterfinal series, 8–5 (Michigan State); Lost Semifinal, 2–3 (St. Lawrence); Lost Third-place game, 2–5 (Maine)
1988–89	WCHA	35	27	6	2	–	–	–	36	1st	48	34	11	3	.740	Won First round series, 2–0 (Colorado College); Lost Semifinal, 1–2 (Denver); Lost Third-place game, 3–4 (Wisconsin)	Won Quarterfinal series, 2–0 (Wisconsin); Won Semifinal, 7–4 (Maine); Lost Championship, 3–4 (OT) (Harvard)
1989–90	WCHA	28	17	9	2	–	–	–	36	2nd	46	28	16	2	.630	Won First round series, 2–0 (Colorado College); Won Semifinal, 5–4 (North Dakota); Lost Championship, 1–7 (Wisconsin)	Won First round series, 2–0 (Clarkson); Lost Quarterfinal series, 1–2 (Boston College)
1990–91	WCHA	32	22	5	5	–	–	–	49	2nd	45	30	10	5	.722	Won First round series, 2–0 (Michigan Tech); Won Semifinal, 3–2 (Wisconsin); Lost Championship, 2–4 (Northern Michigan)	Won First round series, 2–1 (Providence); Lost Quarterfinal series, 0–2 (Maine)
1991–92	WCHA	32	26	6	0	–	–	–	52	1st	44	33	11	0	.750	Won First round series, 2–0 (North Dakota); Won Semifinal, 5–1 (Colorado College); Lost Championship, 2–4 (Northern Michigan)	Lost Regional semifinal, 3–8 (Lake Superior State)
1992–93	WCHA	32	16	9	7	–	–	–	39	T–2nd	42	22	12	8	.619	Won First round series, 2–0 (North Dakota); Won Semifinal, 3–2 (OT) (Wisconsin); Won Championship, 5–3 (Northern Michigan)	Won Regional Quarterfinal, 2–1 (Clarkson); Lost Regional semifinal, 2–6 (Maine)
1993–94	WCHA	32	18	10	4	–	–	–	40	2nd	42	25	13	4	.650	Won First round series, 2–0 (Denver); Won Semifinal, 6–1 (Michigan Tech); Won Championship, 3–2 (OT) (St. Cloud State)	Won Regional semifinal, 2–1 (2OT) (Massachusetts–Lowell); Lost National semifinal, 1–4 (Boston University)
1994–95	WCHA	32	16	11	5	–	–	–	37	4th	44	25	14	5	.625	Won First round series, 2–0 (Minnesota–Duluth); Won Quarterfinal, 3–2 (North Dakota); Lost Semifinal, 4–5 (OT) (Colorado College); Won Third-place game, 5–4 (OT) (Denver)	Won Regional Quarterfinal, 1–0 (Rensselaer); Won Regional semifinal, 5–2 (Colorado College); Lost National semifinal, 3–7 (Boston University)
1995–96	WCHA	32	21	9	2	–	–	–	44	2nd	42‡	30‡	10‡	2‡	.738	Won First round series, 2–0 (Alaska–Anchorage); Won Semifinal, 4–3 (OT) (Wisconsin); Won Championship, 7–2 (Michigan Tech)	Won Regional Quarterfinal, 5–1 (Providence); Lost Regional semifinal, 3–4 (Michigan)
1996–97	WCHA	32	21	10	1	–	–	–	43	T–1st	42‡	28‡	13‡	1‡	.679	Won First round series, 2–0 (Alaska–Anchorage); Won Semifinal, 5–4 (OT) (St. Cloud State); Lost Championship, 3–4 (OT) (North Dakota)	Won Regional Quarterfinal, 6–3 (Michigan State); Lost Regional semifinal, 4–7 (Michigan)
1997–98	WCHA	28	12	16	0	–	–	–	24	6th	39	17	22	0	.436	Lost First round series, 1–2 (Minnesota–Duluth)	
1998–99	WCHA	28	10	12	6	–	–	–	26	5th	43	15	19	9	.453	Won First round series, 2–0 (Alaska–Anchorage); Won Quarterfinal, 5–3 (St. Cloud State); Lost Semifinal, 2–6 (North Dakota); Lost Third-place game, 4–7 (Colorado College)	
Don Lucia (1999–2018)
1999–00	WCHA	28	13	13	2	–	–	–	28	6th	41	20	19	2	.512	Won First round series, 2–0 (Colorado College); Won Quarterfinal, 6–4 (Minnesota State–Mankato); Lost Semifinal, 3–5 (Wisconsin); Lost Third-place game, 4–6 (St. Cloud State)	
2000–01	WCHA	28	18	8	2	–	–	–	38	3rd	42	27	13	2	.667	Won First round series, 2–0 (Michigan Tech); Lost Semifinal, 0–3 (St. Cloud State); Lost Third-place game, 4–5 (Colorado College)	Lost Regional Quarterfinal, 4–5 (OT) (Maine)
2001–02	WCHA	28	18	7	3	–	–	–	39	3rd	44	32	8	4	.773	Won First round series, 2–0 (North Dakota); Won Semifinal, 4–1 (St. Cloud State); Lost Championship, 2–5 (Denver)	Won Regional semifinal, 4–2 (Colorado College); Won National semifinal, 3–2 (Michigan); Won National Championship, 4–3 (OT) (Maine)
2002–03	WCHA	28	15	6	7	–	–	–	37	T–2nd	45	28	8	9	.722	Won First round series, 2–0 (Michigan Tech); Won Semifinal, 3–2 (OT) (Minnesota State); Won Championship, 4–2 (Colorado College)	Won Regional semifinal, 9–2 (Mercyhurst); Won Regional final, 7–4 (Ferris State); Won National semifinal, 3–2 (OT) (Michigan); Won National Championship, 5–1 (New Hampshire)
2003–04	WCHA	28	15	12	1	–	–	–	31	T–4th	44	27	14	3	.648	Won First round series, 2–0 (St. Cloud State); Won Semifinal, 7–4 (Minnesota–Duluth); Won Championship, 5–4 (North Dakota)	Won Regional semifinal, 5–2 (Notre Dame); Lost Regional final, 1–3 (Minnesota–Duluth)
2004–05	WCHA	28	17	10	1	–	–	–	35	T–3rd	44	28	15	1	.648	Won First round series, 2–0 (Minnesota State); Lost Semifinal, 0–3 (Colorado College); Lost Third-place game, 2–4 (North Dakota)	Won Regional semifinal, 1–0 (OT) (Maine); Won Regional final, 2–1 (OT) (Cornell); Lost National semifinal, 2–4 (North Dakota)
2005–06	WCHA	28	20	5	3	–	–	–	43	1st	41	27	9	5	.720	Won First round series, 2–0 (Alaska–Anchorage); Lost Semifinal, 7–8 (OT) (St. Cloud State); Lost Third-place game, 0–4 (Wisconsin)	Lost Regional semifinal, 3–4 (OT) (Holy Cross)
2006–07	WCHA	28	18	7	3	–	–	–	39	1st	44	31	10	3	.739	Won First round series, 2–0 (Alaska–Anchorage); Won Semifinal, 4–2 (Wisconsin); Won Championship, 3–2 (OT) (North Dakota)	Won Regional semifinal, 4–3 (Air Force); Lost Regional final, 2–3 (OT) (North Dakota)
2007–08	WCHA	28	9	12	7	–	–	–	25	7th	45	19	17	9	.522	Won First round series, 2–1 (Minnesota State); Won Quarterfinal, 3–2 (St. Cloud State); Won Semifinal, 2–1 (OT) (Colorado College); Lost Championship, 1–2 (Denver)	Lost Regional semifinal, 2–5 (Boston College)
2008–09	WCHA	28	12	11	5	–	–	–	29	5th	37	17	13	7	.554	Won First round series, 2–0 (St. Cloud State); Lost Quarterfinal, 1–2 (Minnesota–Duluth)	
2009–10	WCHA	28	12	14	2	–	–	–	26	7th	39	18	19	2	.487	Lost First round series, 1–2 (North Dakota)	
2010–11	WCHA	28	13	10	5	–	–	–	31	5th	36	16	14	6	.528	Lost First round series, 0–2 (Alaska–Anchorage)	
2011–12	WCHA	28	20	8	0	–	–	–	40	1st	43	28	14	1	.663	Won First round series, 2–0 (Alaska–Anchorage); Lost Semifinal, 3–6 (North Dakota)	Won Regional semifinal, 7–3 (Boston University); Won Regional final, 5–2 (North Dakota); Lost National semifinal, 1–6 (Boston College)
2012–13	WCHA	28	16	7	5	–	–	–	37	T–1st	40	26	9	5	.713	Won First round series, 2–0 (Bemidji State); Lost Semifinal, 0–2 (Colorado College)	Lost Regional semifinal, 2–3 (OT) (Yale)
2013–14	Big Ten	20	14	3	3	–	–	0	45	1st	41	28	7	6	.756	Lost Semifinal, 1–3 (Ohio State)	Won Regional semifinal, 7–3 (Robert Morris); Won Regional final, 4–0 (St. Cloud State); Won National semifinal, 2–1 (North Dakota); Lost National Championship, 4–7 (Union)
2014–15	Big Ten	20	12	5	3	–	–	0	39	1st	39	23	13	3	.628	Won Semifinal, 3–0 (Ohio State); Won Championship, 4–2 (Michigan)	Lost Regional semifinal, 1–4 (Minnesota–Duluth)
2015–16	Big Ten	20	14	6	0	–	–	0	42	1st	37	20	17	0	.541	Won Semifinal, 4–2 (Ohio State); Lost Championship, 3–5 (Michigan)	
2016–17	Big Ten	20	14	5	1	–	–	0	43	1st	38	23	12	3	.645	Lost Semifinal, 3–4 (2OT) (Penn State)	Lost Regional semifinal, 2–3 (Notre Dame)
2017–18	Big Ten	24	10	12	2	–	–	1	33	5th	38	19	17	2	.526	Lost Quarterfinal series, 0–2 (Penn State)	
Bob Motzko (2018–Present)
2018–19	Big Ten	24	11	10	3	–	–	0	36	3rd	38	18	16	4	.526	Won Quarterfinal series, 2–0 (Michigan); Lost Semifinal, 1–2 (OT) (Notre Dame)	
2019–20	Big Ten	24	9	8	7	–	–	4	38	T–2nd	37	16	14	7	.527	Won Quarterfinal series, 2–1 (Notre Dame); Tournament cancelled	
2020–21	Big Ten	22	16	6	0	0	0	0	.727	2nd	31	24	7	0	.774	Won Quarterfinal, 2–1 (OT) (Michigan State); Won Semifinal, 3–2 (OT) (Michigan); Won Championship, 6–4 (Wisconsin)	Won Regional semifinal, 7–2 (Omaha); Lost Regional final, 0–4 (Minnesota State)
2021–22	Big Ten	24	18	6	0	1	2	0	55	1st	39	26	13	0	.667	Won Semifinal, 3–2 (Penn State); Lost Championship, 3–4 (Michigan)	Won Regional semifinal, 4–3 (OT) (Massachusetts); Won Regional final, 3–0 (Western Michigan); Lost National semifinal, 1–5 (Minnesota State)
2022–23	Big Ten	24	19	4	1	2	1	0	57	1st	40	29	10	1	.738	Won Semifinal, 5–1 (Michigan State); Lost Championship, 3–4 (Michigan)	Won Regional semifinal, 9–2 (Canisius); Won Regional final, 4–1 (St. Cloud State); Won National semifinal, 6–2 (Boston University); Lost National Championship, 2–3 (OT) (Quinnipiac)
2023–24	Big Ten	24	13	7	4	3	1	0	41	3rd	39	23	11	5	.654	Won Quarterfinal series, 2–0 (Penn State); Lost Semifinal, 1–2 (Michigan)	Won Regional Semifinal, 3–2 (Omaha); Lost Regional Final, 3–6 (Boston University)
2024–25	Big Ten	24	15	6	3	1	3	0	50	T–1st	40	25	11	4	.675	Lost Quarterfinal series, 1–2 (Notre Dame)	Lost Regional Semifinal, 4–5 (OT) (Massachusetts)
Totals											GP	W	L	T	%	Championships	
Regular season											2964	1774	986	204	.633	14 MCHL/WIHL/WCHA Championships, 17 (7 modern era) Big Ten Championships	
Conference Post-season											198	121	71	6	.626	14 WCHA tournament championships, 2 Big Ten tournament championships	
NCAA Post-season											105	62	43	0	.590	42 NCAA Tournament appearances	
Regular season and Post-season Record											3267	1957	1100	210	.631	5 NCAA Division I National Championships	

†Sonmor resigned in December 1971.
‡Mike Guentzel Served as an interim coach for a total of three games in two seasons while Doug Woog was suspended.
