= Western Collegiate Hockey Association men's champions =

The following is a list of men's champions of the Western Collegiate Hockey Association, including champions of the conference's playoff tournament, the WCHA Final Five.

== Championships by season ==
Season	Regular season champion	Tournament champion	NCAA national champion	Notes
1951–52	Colorado College	—	Michigan	Midwest Collegiate Hockey League play begins with Colorado College, Denver, Michigan, Michigan State, Michigan Tech, Minnesota and North Dakota; first season the MacNaughton Cup is awarded to regular season champion
1952–53	Minnesota; Michigan	—	Michigan	
1953–54	Minnesota	—		League name changed to the Western Intercollegiate Hockey League
1954–55	Colorado College	—	Michigan	
1955–56	Michigan	—	Michigan	
1956–57	Colorado College	—	Colorado College	
1957–58	North Dakota; Denver	—	Denver	
1958–59	—	—	North Dakota	No league play because Minnesota, Michigan, Michigan State and Michigan Tech withdraw from the WIHL due to disagreement over the recruiting practices of University of North Dakota, Denver, and Colorado College.
1959–60	Denver	Denver; Michigan Tech	Denver	Western Collegiate Hockey Association founded; tournament play begins
1960–61	Denver	Denver; Minnesota	Denver	
1961–62	Michigan Tech	Michigan Tech	Michigan Tech	The WCHA begins awarding the MacNaughton Cup to the conference's tournament champion
1962–63	Denver; North Dakota	Denver	North Dakota	
1963–64	Michigan; Denver	Denver	Michigan	
1964–65	North Dakota	Michigan Tech	Michigan Tech	
1965–66	Michigan Tech	Denver; Michigan State	Michigan State	The WCHA decides to once again award the MacNaughton Cup to the regular season champion
1966–67	North Dakota	Michigan State; North Dakota		Minnesota-Duluth joins the WCHA
1967–68	Denver	Denver; North Dakota	Denver	
1968–69	Michigan Tech	Denver; Michigan Tech	Denver	
1969–70	Minnesota	Michigan Tech; Wisconsin		Wisconsin joins the WCHA
1970–71	Michigan Tech	Denver; Minnesota		
1971–72	Denver	Denver; Wisconsin		Notre Dame joins the WCHA
1972–73	Denver	Denver; Wisconsin	Wisconsin	
1973–74	Michigan Tech	Michigan Tech; Minnesota	Minnesota	
1974–75	Minnesota	Michigan Tech; Minnesota	Michigan Tech	
1975–76	Michigan Tech	Michigan Tech; Minnesota	Minnesota	
1976–77	Wisconsin	Wisconsin	Wisconsin	
1977–78	Denver	Colorado College; Wisconsin		
1978–79	North Dakota	Minnesota; North Dakota	Minnesota	
1979–80	North Dakota	Minnesota; North Dakota	North Dakota	Plan to split the conference into two divisions is rejected
1980–81	Minnesota	Michigan Tech; Minnesota	Wisconsin	
1981–82	North Dakota	Wisconsin	North Dakota	Michigan, Michigan State, Michigan Tech and Notre Dame leave conference for the Central Collegiate Hockey Association; the Broadmoor Trophy replaces the MacNaughton Cup as the trophy for the regular season champion
1982–83	Minnesota	Wisconsin	Wisconsin	
1983–84	Minnesota-Duluth	Minnesota-Duluth		
1984–85	Minnesota-Duluth	Minnesota-Duluth		Michigan Tech rejoins the WCHA and brings the MacNaughton Cup back to the conference; Northern Michigan joins the WCHA; interlocking schedule with Hockey East begins (interconference games counted in conference standings); first season the Broadmoor Trophy awarded to the tournament champion
1985–86	Denver	Denver		
1986–87	North Dakota	North Dakota	North Dakota	
1987–88	Minnesota	Wisconsin		Tournament changed to a single-site four team format
1988–89	Minnesota	Northern Michigan		Last season of interlocking schedule with Hockey East
1989–90	Wisconsin	Wisconsin	Wisconsin	
1990–91	Northern Michigan	Northern Michigan	Northern Michigan	St. Cloud State joins the WCHA
1991–92	Minnesota	Northern Michigan		
1992–93	Minnesota-Duluth	Minnesota		Tournament changed to five team format and renamed the Final Five
1993–94	Colorado College	Minnesota		Alaska-Anchorage joins the WCHA
1994–95	Colorado College	Wisconsin		
1995–96	Colorado College	Minnesota		
1996–97	Minnesota; North Dakota	North Dakota	North Dakota	
1997–98	North Dakota	Wisconsin		Northern Michigan leaves the conference for the CCHA; Mankato State (now Minnesota State-Mankato) participates in the WCHA tournament
1998–99	North Dakota	Denver		
1999–00	Wisconsin	North Dakota	North Dakota	Minnesota State joins the WCHA
2000–01	North Dakota	St. Cloud State		
2001–02	Denver	Denver	Minnesota	
2002–03	Colorado College	Minnesota	Minnesota	
2003–04	North Dakota	Minnesota	Denver	
2004–05	Colorado College; Denver	Denver	Denver	
2005–06	Minnesota	North Dakota	Wisconsin	
2006–07	Minnesota	Minnesota		
2007–08	Colorado College	Denver		
2008–09	North Dakota	Minnesota-Duluth		
2009–10	Denver	North Dakota		
2010–11	North Dakota	North Dakota	Minnesota-Duluth	Bemidji State and Omaha join the WCHA
2011–12	Minnesota	North Dakota		
2012–13	St. Cloud State; Minnesota	Wisconsin		Final WCHA season for Colorado College, Denver, Minnesota-Duluth, Omaha, North Dakota, and St. Cloud State (all leaving for NCHC in 2013–2014) as well as Minnesota and Wisconsin (both leaving for Big Ten Conference)
2013–14	Ferris State	Minnesota State		Northern Michigan rejoins WCHA; first WCHA season for Alabama-Huntsville, Alaska-Fairbanks, Bowling Green, Ferris State, and Lake Superior State
2014–15	Minnesota State	Minnesota State		
2015–16	Minnesota State; Michigan Tech	Ferris State		
2016–17	Bemidji State	Michigan Tech		
2017–18	Minnesota State	Michigan Tech		
2018–19	Minnesota State	Minnesota State		
2019–20	Minnesota State	Tournament cancelled due to the coronavirus pandemic		
2020–21	Minnesota State	Lake Superior State		At the conclusion of the season, 8 teams withdrew from the conference (Alabama–Huntsville, Bemidji State, Bowling Green, Ferris State, Lake Superior State, Michigan Tech, Minnesota State, Northern Michigan). The remaining two programs, Alaska and Alaska Anchorage, formally suspended the men's division of the WCHA.

== WCHA tournament champions ==
Year	Winning team(s)	Coach	Losing team	Coach	Score	Location	Venue
1960	Michigan Tech†; Denver‡	John MacInnes; Murray Armstrong	North Dakota; Colorado College	Barry Thorndycraft; Tony Frasca	9–7*; 12–3*	Houghton, Michigan; Denver, Colorado	Dee Stadium; DU Arena
1961	Minnesota†; Denver‡	John Mariucci; Murray Armstrong	Michigan; Michigan Tech	Al Renfrew; John MacInnes	6–4*; 17–3*	Minneapolis, Minnesota; Denver, Colorado	Williams Arena; DU Arena
1962	Michigan Tech	John MacInnes	Michigan	Al Renfrew	6–4	Ann Arbor, Michigan	Weinberg Coliseum
1963	Denver	Murray Armstrong	North Dakota	Barry Thorndycraft	5–4 (OT)	Denver, Colorado	DU Arena
1964	Denver	Murray Armstrong	Michigan	Al Renfrew	6–2	Ann Arbor, Michigan	Weinberg Coliseum
1965	Michigan Tech	John MacInnes	North Dakota	Bob Peters	6–4	Grand Forks, North Dakota	Winter Sports Building
1966	Michigan State†; Denver‡	Amo Bessone; Murray Armstrong	Michigan Tech; North Dakota	John MacInnes; Bob Peters	4–3; 5–4 (OT)	Houghton, Michigan; Denver, Colorado	Dee Stadium; DU Arena
1967	Michigan State†; North Dakota‡	Amo Bessone; Bill Selman	Michigan Tech; Denver	John MacInnes; Murray Armstrong	2–1 (OT); 3–2	Houghton, Michigan; Denver, Colorado	Dee Stadium; DU Arena
1968	North Dakota†; Denver‡	Bill Selman; Murray Armstrong	Michigan Tech; Minnesota	John MacInnes; Glen Sonmor	3–2*; 16–3*	Houghton, Michigan; Denver, Colorado	Dee Stadium; DU Arena
1969	Michigan Tech†; Denver‡	John MacInnes; Murray Armstrong	Michigan; Colorado College	Al Renfrew; John Matchefts	7–4; 3–1	Ann Arbor, Michigan; Denver, Colorado	Weinberg Coliseum; DU Arena
1970	Michigan Tech†; Wisconsin‡	John MacInnes; Bob Johnson	Minnesota; Denver	Glen Sonmor; Murray Armstrong	6–5; 3–2	Duluth, Minnesota; Denver, Colorado	Duluth Arena Auditorium; DU Arena
1971	Minnesota†; Denver‡	Glen Sonmor; Murray Armstrong	North Dakota; Minnesota-Duluth	Rube Bjorkman; Terry Shercliffe	5–2; 9–3	Madison, Wisconsin; Denver, Colorado	Dane County Coliseum; DU Arena
1972	Wisconsin†; Denver‡	Bob Johnson; Murray Armstrong	North Dakota; Michigan State	Rube Bjorkman; Amo Bessone	6–2*; 11–4*	Madison, Wisconsin; Denver, Colorado	Dane County Coliseum; DU Arena
1973	Wisconsin†; Denver‡	Bob Johnson; Murray Armstrong	Notre Dame; Michigan Tech	Lefty Smith; John MacInnes	8–7*; 7–3*	Notre Dame, Indiana; Denver, Colorado	Edmund P. Joyce Center; DU Arena
1974	Michigan Tech†; Minnesota‡	John MacInnes; Herb Brooks	Michigan State; Denver	Amo Bessone; Murray Armstrong	12–10*; 5–4*	Houghton, Michigan; Minneapolis, Minnesota	Student Ice Arena; Williams Arena
1975	Michigan Tech†; Minnesota‡	John MacInnes; Herb Brooks	Michigan State; Michigan	Amo Bessone; Dan Farrell	15–8*; 8–5*	Houghton, Michigan; Minneapolis, Minnesota	Student Ice Arena; Williams Arena
1976	Minnesota†; Michigan Tech‡	Herb Brooks; John MacInnes	Michigan State; Michigan	Amo Bessone; Dan Farrell	9–9*; 10–7*	East Lansing, Michigan; Houghton, Michigan	Munn Ice Arena; Student Ice Arena
1977	Wisconsin	Bob Johnson	Michigan	Dan Farrell	9–4*	Madison, Wisconsin	Dane County Coliseum
1978	Wisconsin†; Colorado College‡	Bob Johnson; Jeff Sauer	Michigan Tech; Denver	John MacInnes; Marshall Johnston	11–7*; 9–7*	Madison, Wisconsin; Denver, Colorado	Dane County Coliseum; DU Arena
1979	Minnesota†; North Dakota‡	Herb Brooks; John Gasparini	Minnesota-Duluth; Wisconsin	Gus Hendrickson; Bob Johnson	8–4*; 11–9*	Minneapolis, Minnesota; Grand Forks, North Dakota	Williams Arena; Ralph Engelstad Arena
1980	Minnesota†; North Dakota‡	Brad Buetow; John Gasparini	Colorado College; Notre Dame	Jeff Sauer; Lefty Smith	13–4*; 17–8*	Minneapolis, Minnesota; Grand Forks, North Dakota	Williams Arena; Ralph Engelstad Arena
1981	Michigan Tech†; Minnesota‡	John MacInnes; Brad Buetow	Colorado College; Michigan	Jeff Sauer; John Giordano	13–4*; 17–8*	Houghton, Michigan; Minneapolis, Minnesota	Student Ice Arena; Williams Arena
1982	Wisconsin	Bob Johnson	North Dakota	John Gasparini	12–1*	Grand Forks, North Dakota	Ralph Engelstad Arena
1983	Wisconsin	Jeff Sauer	Minnesota	Brad Buetow	8–3*	Minneapolis, Minnesota	Williams Arena
1984	Minnesota-Duluth	Mike Sertich	North Dakota	John Gasparini	12–6*	Minneapolis, Minnesota	Williams Arena
1985	Minnesota-Duluth	Mike Sertich	Minnesota	Brad Buetow	10–8*	Duluth, Minnesota	Duluth Arena Auditorium
1986	Denver	Ralph Backstrom	Minnesota	Doug Woog	6–2*	Denver, Colorado	DU Arena
1987	North Dakota	John Gasparini	Minnesota	Doug Woog	10–6*	Grand Forks, North Dakota	Ralph Engelstad Arena
1988	Wisconsin	Jeff Sauer	Minnesota	Doug Woog	3–2	St. Paul, Minnesota	Civic Center
1989	Northern Michigan	Rick Comley	Denver	Ralph Backstrom	9–4	St. Paul, Minnesota	Civic Center
1990	Wisconsin	Jeff Sauer	Minnesota	Doug Woog	7–1	St. Paul, Minnesota	Civic Center
1991	Northern Michigan	Rick Comley	Minnesota	Doug Woog	4–2	St. Paul, Minnesota	Civic Center
1992	Northern Michigan	Rick Comley	Minnesota	Doug Woog	4–2	St. Paul, Minnesota	Civic Center
1993	Minnesota	Doug Woog	Northern Michigan	Rick Comley	5–3	St. Paul, Minnesota	Civic Center
1994	Minnesota	Doug Woog	St. Cloud State	Craig Dahl	3–2 (OT)	Milwaukee, Wisconsin	Bradley Center
1995	Wisconsin	Jeff Sauer	Colorado College	Don Lucia	4–3 (OT)	St. Paul, Minnesota	Civic Center
1996	Minnesota	Doug Woog	Michigan Tech	Bob Mancini	7–2	Milwaukee, Wisconsin	Bradley Center
1997	North Dakota	Dean Blais	Minnesota	Doug Woog	4–3 (OT)	St. Paul, Minnesota	Civic Center
1998	Wisconsin	Jeff Sauer	North Dakota	Dean Blais	3–2	Milwaukee, Wisconsin	Bradley Center
1999	Denver	George Gwozdecky	North Dakota	Dean Blais	4–3	Minneapolis	Target Center
2000	North Dakota	Dean Blais	Wisconsin	Jeff Sauer	5–3	Minneapolis, Minnesota	Target Center
2001	St. Cloud State	Craig Dahl	North Dakota	Dean Blais	6–5 (OT)	St. Paul, Minnesota	Xcel Energy Center
2002	Denver	George Gwozdecky	Minnesota	Don Lucia	5–2	St. Paul, Minnesota	Xcel Energy Center
2003	Minnesota	Don Lucia	Colorado College	Scott Owens	4–2	St. Paul, Minnesota	Xcel Energy Center
2004	Minnesota	Don Lucia	North Dakota	Dean Blais	5–4	St. Paul, Minnesota	Xcel Energy Center
2005	Denver	George Gwozdecky	Colorado College	Scott Owens	1–0	St. Paul, Minnesota	Xcel Energy Center
2006	North Dakota	Dave Hakstol	St. Cloud State	Bob Motzko	5–3	St. Paul, Minnesota	Xcel Energy Center
2007	Minnesota	Don Lucia	North Dakota	Dave Hakstol	3–2 (OT)	St. Paul, Minnesota	Xcel Energy Center
2008	Denver	George Gwozdecky	Minnesota	Don Lucia	2–1	St. Paul, Minnesota	Xcel Energy Center
2009	Minnesota-Duluth	Scott Sandelin	Denver	George Gwozdecky	4–0	St. Paul, Minnesota	Xcel Energy Center
2010	North Dakota	Dave Hakstol	St. Cloud State	Bob Motzko	5–3	St. Paul, Minnesota	Xcel Energy Center
2011	North Dakota	Dave Hakstol	Denver	George Gwozdecky	3–2 (2OT)	St. Paul, Minnesota	Xcel Energy Center
2012	North Dakota	Dave Hakstol	Denver	George Gwozdecky	4–0	St. Paul, Minnesota	Xcel Energy Center
2013	Wisconsin	Mike Eaves	Colorado College	Scott Owens	3–2	St. Paul, Minnesota	Xcel Energy Center
2014	Minnesota State	Mike Hastings	Ferris State	Bob Daniels	4–1	Grand Rapids, Michigan	Van Andel Arena
2015	Minnesota State	Mike Hastings	Michigan Tech	Mel Pearson	5–2	St. Paul, Minnesota	Xcel Energy Center
2016	Ferris State	Bob Daniels	Minnesota State	Mike Hastings	2–1	Grand Rapids, Michigan	Van Andel Arena
2017	Michigan Tech	Mel Pearson	Bowling Green	Chris Bergeron	3-2 (2OT)	Houghton, Michigan	MacInnes Student Ice Arena
2018	Michigan Tech	Joe Shawhan	Northern Michigan	Grant Potulny	2–0	Marquette, Michigan	Berry Events Center
2019	Minnesota State	Mike Hastings	Bowling Green	Chris Bergeron	3–2 (OT)	Mankato, Minnesota	Mankato Civic Center
2020	Cancelled due to COVID-19 pandemic						
2021	Lake Superior State	Damon Whitten	Northern Michigan	Grant Potulny	6–3	Mankato, Minnesota	Mayo Clinic Health System Event Center

† East regional champion
‡ West regional champion
* Champion decided by a total goal sum in multiple games

== Championships by school ==
School	WCHA regular season championships	WCHA tournament championships	NCAA national championships	Last WCHA regular season championship	Last WCHA tournament championship	Last NCAA national championship
Alabama–Huntsville	0	0	0 †	Never	Never	Never †
Alaska	0	0	0	Never	Never	Never
Alaska–Anchorage	0	0	0	Never	Never	Never
Bemidji State	1	0	0 †	2017	Never	Never †
Bowling Green	0	0	1	Never	Never	1984
Colorado College	9	1	2	2008	1978	1957
Denver	13	15	8	2010	2008	2022
Ferris State	1	1	0	2014	Never	Never
Lake Superior State	0	1	3	Never	2021	1994
Michigan	3	0	9	1964	Never	1998
Michigan State	0	2	3	Never	1967	2007
Michigan Tech	7	11	3	2016	2018	1975
Minnesota	14	14	5	2013	2007	2003
Minnesota–Duluth	3	3	2	1993	2009	2019
Minnesota State	5	3	0 †	2021	2019	Never †
Omaha	0	0	0	Never	Never	Never
North Dakota	15	11	7	2011	2012	2016
Northern Michigan	1	3	1	1991	1992	1991
Notre Dame	0	0	0	Never	Never	Never
St. Cloud State	1	1	0	2013	2001	Never
Wisconsin	3	12	6	2000	2013	2006

† Program won at least one national championship at NCAA Division II and/or Division III level

Colorado College won its first NCAA national championship in 1950, prior to the founding of the Midwest Collegiate Hockey League. Likewise, Michigan won its 1948 title prior to the start of league play. North Dakota won a national title in 1959 as an independent. The Wolverines won two additional national championships in 1996 and 1998 after leaving the WCHA for the CCHA. Michigan State also won its 1986 and 2007 national championships after leaving the WCHA. Two of the five schools that made their WCHA debuts in 2013, Bowling Green and Lake Superior State, won all of their national championships while in the CCHA (one for Bowling Green in 1984, and three for Lake Superior State in 1988, 1992, and 1994).
