= Bob Mancini =

Biographical details
- Born: March 16, 1958 (age 68); Seaford, New York, U.S.
- Education: Colorado College

Playing career
- 1976-1978: Austin Mavericks
- 1978-1982: Colorado College
- 1982-1983: HC Selva
- Position: Wing

Coaching career (HC unless noted)
- 1985-1986: Lake Superior State (assistant)
- 1986-1989: Ferris State (assistant)
- 1990-1992: Ferris State
- 1992-1996: Michigan Tech
- 1996-2000: US NTDP U-17
- 1997: USA U-20 (Dir. of Player Per.)
- 1997: Team USA (assistant)
- 1998: Team USA (assistant)
- 1999: USA U-20
- 1999: USA U-18 (assistant)
- 2000: USA U-18 (assistant)
- 2000-2004: Edmonton Oilers (scout)
- 2004-2007: Saginaw Spirit
- 2007-2009: Edmonton Oilers (dev. coach)
- 2012: South Africa (assistant)
- 2012-2015: South Africa

Head coaching record
- Overall: 99-112-32 (.473) (college)

Bob Mancini (born March 16, 1958) is a current regional manager for the USA Hockey American Development Model and the former head coach and assistant coach at the collegiate, International, and junior levels.

== Coaching career ==
He also has coached in the NCAA ranks at Michigan Tech and Ferris State University. During his tenure as the head coach of the Michigan Tech Huskies Mancini led the Huskies to three Western Collegiate Hockey Association Final Five appearances.

Mancini served as an assistant coach and the director of player personnel for the USA Hockey National Team Development Program from 1997-2000.

He became the head coach and general manager of the Saginaw Spirit ice hockey team of the Ontario Hockey League in 2005 when Mancini took over the duties from Doug Lidster. He spent a little over three seasons as head coach from 2005-2007. Mancini led the Spirit to the team's first two playoff appearances in 2006, 2007 and the team's most successful season in terms of wins and points during the 2006-07 season.

Following his stint with the Spirit, Mancini joined the Edmonton Oilers organization as the Oilers Development Coach to work with the team's AHL and ECHL prospects.

In 2009 he left the Oilers organization to become a regional manager with the new USA Hockey American Development Model.

== Pop culture ==
He has appeared on the Colbert Report on December 5, 2006 to discuss his team's current three game losing streak, again on January 25, 2007 to discuss a game against rival team Oshawa Generals, and March 22, 2007 to discuss his team's upcoming playoff series.

== Head coaching record ==
=== College ===
Record table
Season	Team	Overall	Conference	Standing	Postseason
Ferris State Bulldogs (CCHA) (1990–1992)
1990–91	Ferris State	23-14-5	15-12-5	3rd	CCHA Consolation Game (Loss)
1991–92	Ferris State	13-18-7	11-15-6	6th	CCHA Quarterfinals
Ferris State:		36-32-12	26-27-11		
Michigan Tech Huskies (WCHA) (1992–1996)
1992–93	Michigan Tech	17-15-5	15-12-5	4th	WCHA Quarterfinal
1993–94	Michigan Tech	13-27-5	8-19-5	10th	WCHA Consolation Game (Loss)
1994–95	Michigan Tech	15-20-4	12-17-3	8th	WCHA First Round
1995–96	Michigan Tech	18-18-6	12-14-6	7th	WCHA Runner-Up
Michigan Tech:		63-80-20	47-62-19		
Total:		99-112-32			
National champion Postseason invitational champion Conference regular season champion Conference regular season and conference tournament champion Division regular season champion Division regular season and conference tournament champion Conference tournament champion
