= 1990 WCHA men's ice hockey tournament =

1990 WCHA Men's ice hockey tournament
- Dates: March 1–12, 1990
- Teams: 8
- Finals site: Civic Center; St. Paul, Minnesota
- Champions: Wisconsin (9th title)
- Winning coach: Jeff Sauer (4th title)
- MVP: Steve Rohlik (Wisconsin)
- Attendance: 47,845
- WCHA Men's Ice Hockey Tournaments

The 1990 WCHA Men's Ice Hockey Tournament was the 31st conference playoff in league history and 38th season where a WCHA champion was crowned. The tournament was played between March 1 and March 12, 1990. First round games were played at home team campus sites while all 'Final Four' matches were held at the Civic Center in St. Paul, Minnesota. By winning the tournament, Wisconsin was awarded the Broadmoor Trophy and received the WCHA's automatic bid to the 1990 NCAA Division I Men's Ice Hockey Tournament.

== Format ==
The first round of the postseason tournament featured a best-of-three games format. Teams were seeded No. 1 through No. 8 according to their final conference standing, with a tiebreaker system used to seed teams with an identical number of points accumulated. The top four seeded teams each earned home ice and hosted one of the lower seeded teams.

The winners of the first round series advanced to the semifinal and championship rounds held at the Civic Center. All Final Four games used a single-elimination format. Teams were re-seeded No. 1 through No. 4 according to the final regular season conference standings, with the top remaining seed matched against lowest remaining seed in one semifinal game while the two other semifinalists meeting with the winners advancing to the championship game and the losers competing in a Third Place contest. The Tournament Champion received an automatic bid to the 1990 NCAA Division I Men's Ice Hockey Tournament.

=== Conference standings ===
Note: GP = Games played; W = Wins; L = Losses; T = Ties; PTS = Points; GF = Goals For; GA = Goals Against

1989–90 Western Collegiate Hockey Association standings
	Conference							Overall					
	GP	W	L	T	PTS	GF	GA	GP	W	L	T	GF	GA
Wisconsin†*	28	19	8	1	39	147	111	46	36	9	1	254	166
Minnesota	28	17	9	2	36	147	124	46	28	16	2	227	189
North Dakota	28	15	10	3	33	149	114	45	28	13	4	252	175
Northern Michigan	28	15	12	1	31	130	129	42	22	19	1	191	191
Denver	28	13	15	0	26	130	139	42	18	24	0	183	201
Minnesota-Duluth	28	13	15	0	26	114	112	40	20	19	1	170	152
Colorado College	28	10	17	1	21	97	129	40	18	20	2	152	174
Michigan Tech	28	6	22	0	12	112	168	40	10	30	0	150	218
Championship: Wisconsin † indicates conference regular season champion * indicates conference tournament champion

== Bracket ==
Teams are reseeded after the first round

First Round; March 1–4
1	Wisconsin	4	4*	—
8	Michigan Tech	2	3	—
2	Minnesota	9	9	—
7	Colorado College	3	2	—
(Pairings are reseeded after the first round)
3	North Dakota	11	2	—
6	Minnesota-Duluth	4	1	—
4	Northern Michigan	3	9	—
5	Denver	0	4	—

Semifinals; March 11
1	Wisconsin	4*
4	Northern Michigan	3
2	Minnesota	5
3	North Dakota	4

Championship; March 12
1	Wisconsin	7
2	Minnesota	1
Third place
3	North Dakota	6*
4	Northern Michigan	5

Note: * denotes overtime period(s)

=== First round ===
==== (1) Wisconsin vs. (8) Michigan Tech ====
March 3	Wisconsin	4 – 2	Michigan Tech	Dane County Coliseum

March 4	Wisconsin	4 – 3	OT	Michigan Tech	Dane County Coliseum

Wisconsin won series 2–0

==== (2) Minnesota vs. (7) Colorado College ====
March 2	Minnesota	9 – 3	Colorado College	Mariucci Arena

March 3	Minnesota	9 – 2	Colorado College	Mariucci Arena

Minnesota won series 2–0

==== (3) North Dakota vs. (6) Minnesota-Duluth ====
March 1	North Dakota	11 – 4	Minnesota-Duluth	Ralph Engelstad Arena

March 2	North Dakota	2 – 1	Minnesota-Duluth	Ralph Engelstad Arena

North Dakota won series 2–0

==== (4) Northern Michigan vs. (5) Denver ====
March 2	Northern Michigan	3 – 0	Denver	Lakeview Arena

March 3	Northern Michigan	9 – 4	Denver	Lakeview Arena

Northern Michigan won series 2–0

=== Semifinals ===
==== (1) Wisconsin vs. (4) Northern Michigan ====
March 11	Wisconsin	4 – 3	OT	Northern Michigan	Civic Center

==== (2) Minnesota vs. (3) North Dakota ====
March 11	Minnesota	5 – 4	North Dakota	Civic Center

=== Third Place ===
==== (3) North Dakota vs. (4) Northern Michigan ====
March 12	North Dakota	6 – 5	OT	Northern Michigan	Civic Center

=== Championship ===
==== (1) Wisconsin vs. (2) Minnesota ====
March 12	Wisconsin	7 – 1	Minnesota	Civic Center

== Tournament awards ==
=== All-Tournament Team ===
- F Ken Gernander (Minnesota)
- F Greg Johnson (North Dakota)
- F Russ Romaniuk (North Dakota)
- D Jason Herter (North Dakota)
- D Sean Hill (Wisconsin)
- G Duane Derksen (Wisconsin)

=== MVP ===
- Steve Rohlik (Wisconsin)

== See also ==
- Western Collegiate Hockey Association men's champions
