= 1989 WCHA men's ice hockey tournament =

30th conference playoff in league history

1989 WCHA Men's ice hockey tournament
- Dates: February 24-March 6, 1989
- Teams: 8
- Finals site: Civic Center; St. Paul, Minnesota
- Champions: Northern Michigan (1st title)
- Winning coach: Rick Comley (1st title)
- MVP: Bill Pye (Northern Michigan)
- Attendance: 50,232
- WCHA Men's Ice Hockey Tournaments

The 1989 WCHA Men's Ice Hockey Tournament was the 30th conference playoff in league history and 37th season where a WCHA champion was crowned. The tournament was played between February 24 and March 6, 1989. First round games were played at home team campus sites while all 'Final Four' matches were held at the Civic Center in St. Paul, Minnesota. By winning the tournament, Northern Michigan was awarded the Broadmoor Trophy and received the WCHA's automatic bid to the 1989 NCAA Division I Men's Ice Hockey Tournament.

== Format ==
The first round of the postseason tournament featured a best-of-three games format. Teams were seeded No. 1 through No. 8 according to their final conference standing, with a tiebreaker system used to seed teams with an identical number of points accumulated. The top four seeded teams each earned home ice and hosted one of the lower seeded teams.

The winners of the first round series advanced to the semifinal and championship rounds held at the Civic Center. All Final Four games used a single-elimination format. Teams were re-seeded No. 1 through No. 4 according to the final regular season conference standings, with the top remaining seed matched against lowest remaining seed in one semifinal game while the two other semifinalists meeting with the winners advancing to the championship game and the losers competing in a Third Place contest. The Tournament Champion received an automatic bid to the 1989 NCAA Division I Men's Ice Hockey Tournament.

=== Conference standings ===
Note: GP = Games played; W = Wins; L = Losses; T = Ties; PTS = Points; GF = Goals For; GA = Goals Against

1988–89 Western Collegiate Hockey Association standings
	Conference							Overall					
	GP	W	L	T	PTS	GF	GA	GP	W	L	T	GF	GA
Minnesota†	35	27	6	2	56	157	91	48	34	11	3	209	134
Northern Michigan*	35	20	13	2	42	163	110	45	26	17	2	212	144
Wisconsin	35	17	13	5	39	126	108	46	25	16	5	168	134
North Dakota	35	19	15	1	39	131	119	41	22	18	1	164	138
Denver	35	16	17	2	34	143	144	43	22	19	2	179	178
Michigan Tech	35	15	19	1	31	128	150	42	15	25	2	142	188
Minnesota-Duluth	35	12	21	2	26	106	135	40	15	23	2	126	153
Colorado College	35	9	23	3	21	115	157	40	11	26	3	133	179
Championship: Northern Michigan † indicates conference regular season champion * indicates conference tournament champion

== Bracket ==
Teams are reseeded after the first round

First Round; February 24–27
1	Minnesota	5	7	—
8	Colorado College	4	1	—
2	Northern Michigan	7	7	—
7	Minnesota-Duluth	2	3	—
(Pairings are reseeded after the first round)
3	Wisconsin	5	5	—
6	Michigan Tech	2	3	—
4	North Dakota	7	4	2
5	Denver	1	5	3

Semifinals; March 5
1	Minnesota	1
5	Denver	2
2	Northern Michigan	4
3	Wisconsin	2

Championship; March 6
2	Northern Michigan	9
5	Denver	4
Third place
1	Minnesota	3
3	Wisconsin	4

Note: * denotes overtime period(s)

=== First round ===
==== (1) Minnesota vs. (8) Colorado College ====
February 24	Minnesota	5 – 4	Colorado College	Mariucci Arena

February 25	Minnesota	7 – 1	Colorado College	Mariucci Arena

Minnesota won series 2–0

==== (2) Northern Michigan vs. (7) Minnesota-Duluth ====
February 24	Northern Michigan	7 – 2	Minnesota-Duluth	Lakeview Arena

February 25	Northern Michigan	7 – 3	Minnesota-Duluth	Lakeview Arena

Northern Michigan won series 2–0

==== (3) Wisconsin vs. (6) Michigan Tech ====
February 24	Wisconsin	5 – 2	Michigan Tech	Dane County Coliseum

February 25	Wisconsin	5 – 3	Michigan Tech	Dane County Coliseum

Wisconsin won series 2–0

==== (4) North Dakota vs. (5) Denver ====
February 25	North Dakota	7 – 1	Denver	Ralph Engelstad Arena

February 26	North Dakota	4 – 5	Denver	Ralph Engelstad Arena

February 27	North Dakota	2 – 3	Denver	Ralph Engelstad Arena

Denver won series 2–1

=== Semifinals ===
==== (1) Minnesota vs. (5) Denver ====
March 5	Minnesota	1 – 2	Denver	Civic Center

==== (2) Northern Michigan vs. (3) Wisconsin ====
March 5	Northern Michigan	4 – 2	Wisconsin	Civic Center

=== Third Place ===
==== (1) Minnesota vs. (3) Wisconsin ====
March 6	Minnesota	3 – 4	Wisconsin	Civic Center

=== Championship ===
==== (2) Northern Michigan vs. (5) Denver ====
March 6	Northern Michigan	9 – 4	Denver	Civic Center

== Tournament awards ==
=== All-Tournament Team ===
- F Phil Berger (Northern Michigan)
- F Doug MacDonald (Wisconsin)
- F Jay Moore (Denver)
- D John Goode (Northern Michigan)
- D Darryl Olsen (Northern Michigan)
- G Bill Pye* (Northern Michigan)

* Most Valuable Player(s)

== See also ==
- Western Collegiate Hockey Association men's champions
