= 1983 WCHA men's ice hockey tournament =

1983 WCHA Men's ice hockey tournament
- Dates: February 25-March 13, 1983
- Teams: 6
- Finals site: Williams Arena; Minneapolis, Minnesota
- Champions: Wisconsin (7th title)
- Winning coach: Jeff Sauer (2nd title)
- WCHA Men's Ice Hockey Tournaments

The 1983 WCHA Men's Ice Hockey Tournament was the 24th conference playoff in league history and 31st season where a WCHA champion was crowned. The tournament was played between February 25 and March 13, 1983. First round and semifinal games were played at home team campus sites while the championship match was held at the Williams Arena in Minneapolis, Minnesota. By winning the tournament, Wisconsin received the WCHA's automatic bid to the 1983 NCAA Division I Men's Ice Hockey Tournament.

== Format ==
All member teams were eligible for the tournament and were seeded No. 1 through No. 6 according to their final conference standing, with a tiebreaker system used to seed teams with an identical number of points accumulated. As a result of their receiving the Broadmoor Trophy, Minnesota's home venue, Williams Arena, served as the site for the Championship game regardless of which teams qualified for the penultimate match. Each series were two-game matchups with the team that scored the most goals advancing to the succeeding round. The top two seeded teams received byes into the semifinal round while the third seed and sixth seed and the fourth seed and fifth seed met in the first round. The teams that advanced to the semifinal were re-seeded according to the final regular season conference standings, with the first seed matched against lowest remaining seed in one semifinal game and the second seed meeting with the other advancing team with the winners meeting in the championship round. The Tournament Champion received an automatic bid to the 1983 NCAA Division I Men's Ice Hockey Tournament.

=== Conference standings ===
Note: GP = Games played; W = Wins; L = Losses; T = Ties; PTS = Points; GF = Goals For; GA = Goals Against

1982–83 Western Collegiate Hockey Association standings
	Conference							Overall					
	GP	W	L	T	PTS	GF	GA	GP	W	L	T	GF	GA
Minnesota†	26	18	7	1	37	148	101	46	33	12	1	253	155
North Dakota	26	16	9	1	33	115	71	36	21	13	2	158	100
Wisconsin*	26	15	9	2	32	118	85	47	33	10	4	233	131
Minnesota-Duluth	26	14	12	0	28	103	95	45	28	16	1	193	158
Denver	26	11	15	0	22	120	146	37	15	22	0	177	207
Colorado College	26	2	24	0	4	78	184	35	6	28	1	126	227
Championship: Wisconsin † indicates conference regular season champion * indicates conference tournament champion

== Bracket ==
Teams are reseeded after the first round

First Round; February 25–26
3	Wisconsin	3	5
6	Colorado College	2	2
4	Minnesota-Duluth	7	6
5	Denver	2	2

Semifinals; March 4–5
1	Minnesota	8	3
4	Minnesota-Duluth	2	4
2	North Dakota	1	5
3	Wisconsin	1	6***

Championship; 12-13
1	Minnesota	1	2
3	Wisconsin	5	3

Note: * denotes overtime period(s)

=== First round ===
==== (3) Wisconsin vs. (6) Colorado College ====
February 25	Wisconsin	3 – 2	Colorado College	Dane County Coliseum

February 26	Wisconsin	5 – 2	Colorado College	Dane County Coliseum

Wisconsin won series 8–4

==== (4) Minnesota-Duluth vs. (5) Denver ====
February 25	Minnesota-Duluth	7 – 2	Denver	Duluth Arena Auditorium

February 26	Minnesota-Duluth	6 – 2	Denver	Duluth Arena Auditorium

Minnesota-Duluth won series 13–4

=== Semifinals ===
==== (1) Minnesota vs. (4) Minnesota-Duluth ====
March 4	Minnesota	8 – 2	Minnesota-Duluth	Williams Arena

March 5	Minnesota	3 – 4	Minnesota-Duluth	Williams Arena

Minnesota won series 11–6

==== (2) North Dakota vs. (3) Wisconsin ====
March 4	North Dakota	1 – 1	Wisconsin	Winter Sports Center

March 5	North Dakota	5 – 6	3OT	Wisconsin	Winter Sports Center

Wisconsin won series 7–6

=== Championship ===
==== (1) Minnesota vs. (3) Wisconsin ====
March 12	Minnesota	1 – 5	Wisconsin	Williams Arena

March 13	Minnesota	2 – 3	Wisconsin	Williams Arena

Wisconsin won series 8–3

== Tournament awards ==
None

== See also ==
- Western Collegiate Hockey Association men's champions
