= 1985 WCHA men's ice hockey tournament =

1985 WCHA Men's ice hockey tournament
- Dates: March 1–16, 1985
- Teams: 8
- Finals site: Duluth Arena Auditorium; Duluth, Minnesota
- Champions: Minnesota-Duluth (2nd title)
- Winning coach: Mike Sertich (2nd title)
- WCHA Men's Ice Hockey Tournaments

The 1985 WCHA Men's Ice Hockey Tournament was the 26th conference playoff in league history and 33rd season where a WCHA champion was crowned. The tournament was played between March 1 and March 16, 1985. First round and semifinal games were played at home team campus sites while the championship match was held at the Duluth Arena Auditorium in Duluth, Minnesota. By winning the tournament, Minnesota-Duluth was awarded the Broadmoor Trophy and received the WCHA's automatic bid to the 1985 NCAA Division I Men's Ice Hockey Tournament.

== Format ==
All member teams were eligible for the tournament and were seeded No. 1 through No. 8 according to their final conference standing, with a tiebreaker system used to seed teams with an identical number of points accumulated. The top four seeded teams each earned home ice and hosted one of the lower seeded teams. As a result of their being the regular season champion, Minnesota-Duluth's home venue, Duluth Arena Auditorium, served as the site for the Championship game regardless of which teams qualified for the penultimate match. Each series were two-game matchups with the team that scored the most goals advancing to the succeeding round. The teams that advanced to the semifinal were re-seeded No. 1 through No. 4 according to the final regular season conference standings, with the top remaining seed matched against lowest remaining seed in one semifinal game while the two other semifinalists meeting with the winners advancing to the championship round. The Tournament Champion received an automatic bid to the 1985 NCAA Division I Men's Ice Hockey Tournament.

=== Conference standings ===
Note: GP = Games played; W = Wins; L = Losses; T = Ties; PTS = Points; GF = Goals For; GA = Goals Against

1984–85 Western Collegiate Hockey Association standings
	Conference							Overall					
	GP	W	L	T	PTS	GF	GA	GP	W	L	T	GF	GA
Minnesota-Duluth†*	34	25	7	2	52	178	110	48	36	9	3	257	159
Minnesota	34	21	10	3	45	165	113	47	31	13	3	233	163
Wisconsin	34	20	14	0	40	169	152	42	25	17	0	208	183
North Dakota	34	19	14	1	39	155	114	42	24	16	2	202	148
Denver	34	16	15	3	35	152	155	39	19	17	3	178	177
Colorado College	34	15	19	0	30	141	167	38	17	21	0	164	183
Northern Michigan	34	14	20	0	28	148	160	40	19	21	0	179	180
Michigan Tech	34	13	20	1	27	132	148	40	15	24	1	147	178
Championship: Minnesota-Duluth † indicates conference regular season champion * indicates conference tournament champion

== Bracket ==
Teams are reseeded after the first round

First Round; March 1–3
1	Minnesota-Duluth	3	5	8
8	Michigan Tech	2	2	4
2	Minnesota	3	6	9
7	Northern Michigan	4	4	8
3	Wisconsin	2	7	9
6	Colorado College	1	3	4
4	North Dakota	7	8	15
5	Denver	1	4	5

Semifinals; March 8–10
1	Minnesota-Duluth	4	6	10
4	North Dakota	4	4	8
2	Minnesota	6	8	14
3	Wisconsin	0	7	7

Championship; March 15–16
1	Minnesota-Duluth	4	6	10
2	Minnesota	6	2	8

Note: * denotes overtime period(s)

=== First round ===
==== (1) Minnesota-Duluth vs. (8) Michigan Tech ====
March 1	Minnesota-Duluth	3 – 2	Michigan Tech	Duluth Arena Auditorium

March 2	Minnesota-Duluth	5 – 2	Michigan Tech	Duluth Arena Auditorium

Minnesota-Duluth won series 8–4

==== (2) Minnesota vs. (7) Northern Michigan ====
March 2	Minnesota	3 – 4	Northern Michigan	Mariucci Arena

March 3	Minnesota	6 – 4	Northern Michigan	Mariucci Arena

Minnesota won series 9–8

==== (3) Wisconsin vs. (6) Colorado College ====
March 2	Wisconsin	2 – 1	Colorado College	Dane County Coliseum

March 3	Wisconsin	7 – 3	Colorado College	Dane County Coliseum

Wisconsin won series 9–4

==== (4) North Dakota vs. (5) Denver ====
March 1	North Dakota	7 – 1	Denver	Winter Sports Center

March 2	North Dakota	8 – 4	Denver	Winter Sports Center

North Dakota won series 15–5

=== Semifinals ===
==== (1) Minnesota-Duluth vs. (4) North Dakota ====
March 8	Minnesota-Duluth	4 – 4	North Dakota	Duluth Arena Auditorium

March 9	Minnesota-Duluth	6 – 4	North Dakota	Duluth Arena Auditorium

Minnesota-Duluth won series 10–8

==== (2) Minnesota vs. (3) Wisconsin ====
March 9	Minnesota	6 – 0	Wisconsin	Mariucci Arena

March 10	Minnesota	8 – 7	Wisconsin	Mariucci Arena

Minnesota won series 14–7

=== Championship ===
==== (1) Minnesota-Duluth vs. (2) Minnesota ====
March 15	Minnesota-Duluth	4 – 6	Minnesota	Duluth Arena Auditorium

March 16	Minnesota-Duluth	6 – 2	Minnesota	Duluth Arena Auditorium

Minnesota-Duluth won series 10–8

== Tournament awards ==
None

== See also ==
- Western Collegiate Hockey Association men's champions
