= 1992 WCHA men's ice hockey tournament =

1992 WCHA Men's ice hockey tournament
- Dates: March 13–21, 1992
- Teams: 8
- Finals site: Civic Center; St. Paul, Minnesota
- Champions: Northern Michigan (3rd title)
- Winning coach: Rick Comley (3rd title)
- MVP: Corwin Saurdiff (Northern Michigan)
- Attendance: 44,079
- WCHA Men's Ice Hockey Tournaments

The 1992 WCHA Men's Ice Hockey Tournament was the 33rd conference playoff in league history and 40th season where a WCHA champion was crowned. The tournament was played between March 13 and March 21, 1992. First round games were played at home team campus sites while all 'Final Four' matches were held at the Civic Center in St. Paul, Minnesota. By winning the tournament, Northern Michigan was awarded the Broadmoor Trophy and received the WCHA's automatic bid to the 1992 NCAA Division I Men's Ice Hockey Tournament.

== Format ==
The first round of the postseason tournament featured a best-of-three games format. The team that finished ninth in the conference was not eligible for tournament play. Teams were seeded No. 1 through No. 8 according to their final conference standing, with a tiebreaker system used to seed teams with an identical number of points accumulated. The top four seeded teams each earned home ice and hosted one of the lower seeded teams.

The winners of the first round series advanced to the semifinal and championship rounds held at the Civic Center. All Final Four games used a single-elimination format. Teams were re-seeded No. 1 through No. 4 according to the final regular season conference standings, with the top remaining seed matched against lowest remaining seed in one semifinal game while the two other semifinalists meeting with the winners advancing to the championship game and the losers competing in a Third Place contest. The Tournament Champion received an automatic bid to the 1992 NCAA Division I Men's Ice Hockey Tournament.

=== Conference standings ===
Note: GP = Games Played; W = Wins; L = Losses; T = Ties; PTS = Points; GF = Goals For; GA = Goals Against

1991–92 Western Collegiate Hockey Association standings
	Conference							Overall					
	GP	W	L	T	PTS	GF	GA	GP	W	L	T	GF	GA
Minnesota†	32	26	6	0	52	163	89	44	33	11	0	215	132
Wisconsin	32	19	11	2	40	129	106	43	27	14	2	175	142
Northern Michigan*	32	17	12	3	37	184	133	42	25	14	3	238	165
Colorado College	32	14	14	4	32	138	141	41	18	18	5	170	175
Minnesota-Duluth	32	14	16	2	30	124	137	37	15	20	2	144	162
Michigan Tech	32	14	17	1	29	114	137	39	16	22	1	141	177
St. Cloud State	32	12	19	1	25	120	138	37	14	21	2	150	159
North Dakota	32	12	19	1	25	137	172	39	17	21	1	170	199
Denver	32	8	22	2	18	110	166	36	9	25	2	124	187
Championship: Northern Michigan † indicates conference regular season champion * indicates conference tournament champion

== Bracket ==
Teams are reseeded after the first round

First Round; March 13–15
1	Minnesota	3	9	3
8	North Dakota	5	2	1
2	Wisconsin	6*	3	4*
7	St. Cloud State	5	5	3
(Pairings are reseeded after the first round)
3	Northern Michigan	9	6	—
6	Michigan Tech	1	2	—
4	Colorado College	7***	3	5***
5	Minnesota-Duluth	6	4*	4

Semifinals; March 20
1	Minnesota	5
4	Colorado College	1
2	Wisconsin	3
3	Northern Michigan	6

Championship; March 21
1	Minnesota	2
3	Northern Michigan	4
Third place
2	Wisconsin	5
4	Colorado College	3

Note: * denotes overtime period(s)

=== Quarterfinals ===
==== (1) Minnesota vs. (8) North Dakota ====
March 13	Minnesota	3 – 5	North Dakota	Mariucci Arena

March 14	Minnesota	9 – 2	North Dakota	Mariucci Arena

March 15	Minnesota	3 – 1	North Dakota	Mariucci Arena

Minnesota won series 2–1

==== (2) Wisconsin vs. (7) St. Cloud State ====
March 13	Wisconsin	6 – 5	OT	St. Cloud State	Dane County Coliseum

March 14	Wisconsin	3 – 5	St. Cloud State	Dane County Coliseum

March 15	Wisconsin	4 – 3	OT	St. Cloud State	Dane County Coliseum

Wisconsin won series 2–1

==== (3) Northern Michigan vs. (6) Michigan Tech ====
March 13	Northern Michigan	9 – 1	Michigan Tech	Lakeview Arena

March 14	Northern Michigan	6 – 2	Michigan Tech	Lakeview Arena

Northern Michigan won series 2–0

==== (4) Colorado College vs. (5) Minnesota-Duluth ====
March 13	Colorado College	7 – 6	3OT	Minnesota-Duluth	Broadmoor World Arena

March 14	Colorado College	3 – 4	OT	Minnesota-Duluth	Broadmoor World Arena

March 15	Colorado College	5 – 4	3OT	Minnesota-Duluth	Broadmoor World Arena

Colorado College won series 2–1

=== Semifinals ===
==== (1) Minnesota vs. (4) Colorado College ====
March 20	Minnesota	5 – 1	Colorado College	Civic Center

==== (2) Wisconsin vs. (3) Northern Michigan ====
March 20	Wisconsin	3 – 6	Northern Michigan	Civic Center

=== Third Place ===
==== (2) Wisconsin vs. (4) Colorado College ====
March 21	Wisconsin	5 – 3	Colorado College	Civic Center

=== Championship ===
==== (1) Minnesota vs. (3) Northern Michigan ====
March 21	Minnesota	2 – 4	Northern Michigan	Civic Center

== Tournament awards ==
=== All-Tournament Team ===
- F Craig Johnson (Minnesota)
- F Dan Plante (Wisconsin)
- F Tony Szabo (Northern Michigan)
- D Chris Hynnes (Colorado College)
- D Doug Zmolek (Minnesota)
- G Corwin Saurdiff* (Northern Michigan)

* Most Valuable Player(s)

== See also ==
- Western Collegiate Hockey Association men's champions
