= Gus Hendrickson =

American ice hockey player and coach (1940–2024)

Biographical details
- Born: 1940; Eveleth, Minnesota, U.S.
- Died: January 25, 2024 (aged 83); Grand Rapids, Minnesota, U.S.
- Education: Michigan State University

Playing career
- 1959–1962: Michigan State
- Position: Defenceman

Coaching career (HC unless noted)
- 1971–1975: Grand Rapids High School
- 1975–1982: Minnesota–Duluth

Head coaching record
- Overall: 110–146–11 (.433) [college]

Gustaf Dale Hendrickson (1940 – January 25, 2024) was an American professional ice hockey player and head coach. He was in charge of the program at Minnesota–Duluth for seven seasons.

== Career ==
Hendrickson was born in 1940. He played for Michigan State for three seasons in the early 1960s, helping the team to a third-place finish in the WCHA tournament during his final year of eligibility. After leaving East Lansing Hendrickson found his way behind the bench at Grand Rapids High School. After building a successful program he accepted the post at Minnesota–Duluth, taking his assistant Mike Sertich along for the ride. Hendrickson built the program slowly, finishing out of the playoffs in each of his first two seasons before positive results started to show. By his fourth year it appeared that Hendrickson had the Bulldogs primed to take the next step; led by future Olympic gold medalists Mark Pavelich and John Harrington Minnesota–Duluth compiled their second 20+ win season in program history and achieved a #1 national ranking for a time. Unfortunately for Hendrickson the team slumped after 1978–79 posting losing records in each of the next three seasons. He was let go in 1982 and replaced by his assistant, Sertich.

Hendrickson died on January 25, 2024, at the age of 83.

== Head coaching record ==
=== College ===
Record table
| Season | Team | Overall | Conference | Standing | Postseason |
|---|---|---|---|---|---|
Minnesota–Duluth Bulldogs (WCHA) (1975–1982)
| 1975–76 | Minnesota–Duluth | 15–21–0 | 12–20–0 | t-7th | |
| 1976–77 | Minnesota–Duluth | 9–26–2 | 6–24–2 | 10th | |
| 1977–78 | Minnesota–Duluth | 14–22–1 | 12–19–1 | t-7th | WCHA First Round |
| 1978–79 | Minnesota–Duluth | 22–14–4 | 18–10–4 | t-3rd | WCHA Second Round |
| 1979–80 | Minnesota–Duluth | 17–21–0 | 15–17–0 | 6th | WCHA First Round |
| 1980–81 | Minnesota–Duluth | 17–21–1 | 11–17–0 | 8th | WCHA First Round |
| 1981–82 | Minnesota–Duluth | 16–21–3 | 9–16–1 | 5th | WCHA First Round |
| Minnesota–Duluth: | | 110–146–11 | 83–123–8 | | |
| Total: | | 110–146–11 | | | |
National champion Postseason invitational champion Conference regular season champion Conference regular season and conference tournament champion Division regular season champion Division regular season and conference tournament champion Conference tournament champion
