= 1995 WCHA men's ice hockey tournament =

1995 WCHA Men's ice hockey tournament
- Dates: March 10–18, 1995
- Teams: 10
- Finals site: Civic Center; St. Paul, Minnesota
- Champions: Wisconsin (10th title)
- Winning coach: Jeff Sauer (5th title)
- MVP: Kirk Daubenspeck (Wisconsin)
- Attendance: 55,908
- WCHA Men's Ice Hockey Tournaments

The 1995 WCHA Men's Ice Hockey Tournament was the 36th conference playoff in league history and 43rd season where a WCHA champion was crowned. The tournament was played between March 10 and March 18, 1995. First round games were played at home team campus sites while all 'Final Five' matches were held at the Civic Center in St. Paul, Minnesota. By winning the tournament, Wisconsin was awarded the Broadmoor Trophy and received the WCHA's automatic bid to the 1995 NCAA Division I Men's Ice Hockey Tournament.

== Format ==
The first round of the postseason tournament featured a best-of-three games format. All ten conference teams participated in the tournament and were seeded No. 1 through No. 10 according to their final conference standing, with a tiebreaker system used to seed teams with an identical number of points accumulated. The top five seeded teams each earned home ice and hosted one of the lower seeded teams.

The winners of the first round series advanced to the Civic Center for the WCHA Final Five, the collective name for the quarterfinal, semifinal, and championship rounds. The Final Five uses a single-elimination format. Teams were re-seeded No. 1 through No. 5 according to the final regular season conference standings, with the top three teams automatically advancing to the semifinals and the remaining two playing in a quarterfinal game. The semifinal pitted the top remaining seed against the winner of the quarterfinal game while the two other teams that received byes were matched against one another with the winners advancing to the championship game and the losers meeting in a Third Place contest. The Tournament Champion received an automatic bid to the 1995 NCAA Division I Men's Ice Hockey Tournament.

=== Conference standings ===
Note: GP = Games played; W = Wins; L = Losses; T = Ties; PTS = Points; GF = Goals For; GA = Goals Against

1994–95 Western Collegiate Hockey Association standings
	Conference							Overall					
	GP	W	L	T	PTS	GF	GA	GP	W	L	T	GF	GA
Colorado College†	32	22	9	1	45	155	108	43	30	12	1	213	143
Wisconsin*	32	17	11	4	38	128	112	43	24	15	4	172	152
Denver	32	18	12	2	38	131	115	42	25	15	2	181	147
Minnesota	32	16	11	5	37	121	95	44	25	14	5	169	133
St. Cloud State	32	15	16	1	31	126	113	38	17	20	1	146	139
North Dakota	32	14	15	3	31	120	141	39	18	18	3	151	169
Minnesota-Duluth	32	13	15	4	30	124	127	38	16	18	4	146	146
Michigan Tech	32	12	17	3	27	109	140	39	15	20	4	136	175
Northern Michigan	32	10	19	3	23	110	136	40	13	24	3	142	171
Alaska-Anchorage	32	10	22	0	20	106	142	36	11	25	0	122	169
Championship: Wisconsin † indicates conference regular season champion * indicates conference tournament champion

== Bracket ==
Teams are reseeded after the first round

First Round; March 10–12
1	Colorado College	11	5	—
10	Alaska-Anchorage	3	2	—
2	Wisconsin	3	5	5
9	Northern Michigan	4	4	1
3	Denver	5*	5	—
8	Michigan Tech	4	2	—
4	Minnesota	5*	4	—
7	Minnesota-Duluth	4	3	—
5	St. Cloud State	2	2	—
6	North Dakota	3	5	—

Quarterfinal; March 16
4	Minnesota	3
6	North Dakota	2

Semifinals; March 17
1	Colorado College	5*
4	Minnesota	4
2	Wisconsin	5
3	Denver	4

Championship; March 18
1	Colorado College	3
2	Wisconsin	4*

Note: * denotes overtime period(s)

=== Quarterfinals ===
==== (1) Colorado College vs. (10) Alaska-Anchorage ====
March 10	Colorado College	11 – 3	Alaska-Anchorage	Cadet Ice Arena

March 11	Colorado College	5 – 2	Alaska-Anchorage	Cadet Ice Arena

Colorado College won series 2–0

==== (2) Wisconsin vs. (9) Northern Michigan ====
March 10	Wisconsin	3 – 4	Northern Michigan	Dane County Coliseum

March 11	Wisconsin	5 – 4	Northern Michigan	Dane County Coliseum

March 12	Wisconsin	5 – 1	Northern Michigan	Dane County Coliseum

Wisconsin won series 2–1

==== (3) Denver vs. (8) Michigan Tech ====
March 10	Denver	5 – 4	OT	Michigan Tech	DU Arena

March 11	Denver	5 – 2	Michigan Tech	DU Arena

Denver won series 2–0

==== (4) Minnesota vs. (7) Minnesota-Duluth ====
March 10	Minnesota	5 – 4	OT	Minnesota-Duluth	Mariucci Arena

March 11	Minnesota	4 – 3	Minnesota-Duluth	Mariucci Arena

Minnesota won series 2–0

==== (5) St. Cloud State vs. (6) North Dakota ====
March 10	St. Cloud State	2 – 3	North Dakota	National Hockey Center

March 11	St. Cloud State	2 – 5	North Dakota	National Hockey Center

North Dakota won series 2–0

=== Quarterfinal ===
==== (4) Minnesota vs. (6) North Dakota ====
March 16	Minnesota	3 – 2	North Dakota	Civic Center

=== Semifinals ===
==== (1) Colorado College vs. (4) Minnesota ====
March 17	Colorado College	5 – 4	OT	Minnesota	Civic Center

==== (2) Wisconsin vs. (3) Denver ====
March 17	Wisconsin	5 – 4	Denver	Civic Center

=== Third Place ===
==== (3) Denver vs. (4) Minnesota ====
March 18	Denver	4 – 5	OT	Minnesota	Civic Center

=== Championship ===
==== (1) Colorado College vs. (2) Wisconsin ====
March 18	Colorado College	3 – 4	OT	Wisconsin	Civic Center

== Tournament awards ==
=== All-Tournament Team ===
- F Jason Elders (Denver)
- F Peter Geronazzo (Colorado College)
- F Ryan Kraft (Minnesota)
- D Eric Rud (Colorado College)
- D Mark Strobel (Wisconsin)
- G Kirk Daubenspeck* (Wisconsin)

* Most Valuable Player(s)

== See also ==
- Western Collegiate Hockey Association men's champions
