= Broadmoor Trophy =

- Sport: Ice hockey
- Awarded for: WCHA Tournament Champion

History
- First award: 1982
- Most recent: Michigan Tech

The Broadmoor Trophy is a trophy that was awarded to the Western Collegiate Hockey Association (WCHA) playoff champion from 1985 until its discontinuation in 2018. The trophy itself dates to 1981, when it was awarded to the WCHA regular season champion for three seasons, from 1981–82 to 1983–84. During that time, the Broadmoor Trophy served as the replacement for the MacNaughton Cup, traditionally awarded to the WCHA regular season champion. The trophy is named after The Broadmoor resort in Colorado Springs, Colorado, which has a long history of supporting college hockey.

== History ==
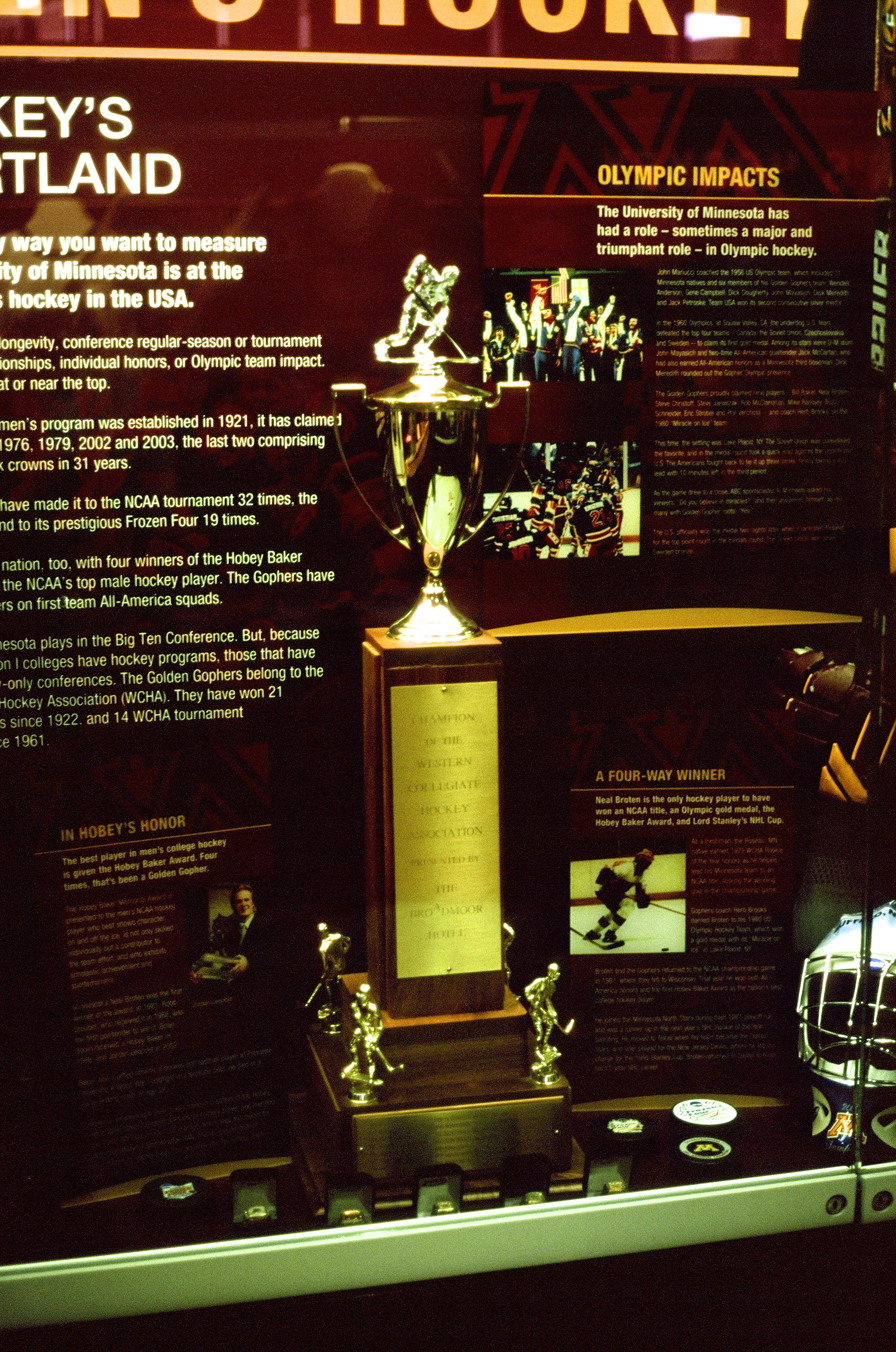
The trophy design used 1981-2010

The Broadmoor Trophy was commissioned as a replacement for the MacNaughton Cup, held in trust by Michigan Tech. In 1981, Michigan Tech left the WCHA for the Central Collegiate Hockey Association, taking the Cup with them. To fill the void, The Broadmoor Resort presented a new trophy to the WCHA to award to their regular season champion. When Michigan Tech returned to the WCHA in 1984, the school returned the MacNaughton Cup to the league. The MacNaughton Cup returned to being awarded to the WCHA regular season champion, while the Broadmoor Trophy began being awarded to the playoff champion.

The trophy was redesigned in 2010. The new bronze cast trophy, created by Blue Ribbon Trophies & Awards of Colorado Springs, Colo., is a recreation of the famous Broadmoor resort.

The WCHA discontinued the Broadmoor Trophy after the 2017–18 season in favor of the Jeff Sauer WCHA Championship Trophy. After the 2019–20 season, the WCHA no longer sponsored men's hockey.

== Champions ==
The Broadmoor Trophy was awarded every year from 1982 to 2018. From 1982 to 1984, the trophy was awarded to the WCHA regular season champions. North Dakota's 8 Broadmoor trophies led the WCHA.

Winners
Year	Champion
1982	North Dakota
1983	Minnesota
1984	Minnesota–Duluth
1985	Minnesota–Duluth
1986	Denver
1987	North Dakota
1988	Wisconsin
1989	Northern Michigan
1990	Wisconsin
1991	Northern Michigan
1992	Northern Michigan
1993	Minnesota
1994	Minnesota
1995	Wisconsin
1996	Minnesota
1997	North Dakota
1998	Wisconsin
1999	Denver
2000	North Dakota
2001	St. Cloud State
2002	Denver
2003	Minnesota
2004	Minnesota
2005	Denver
2006	North Dakota
2007	Minnesota
2008	Denver
2009	Minnesota–Duluth
2010	North Dakota
2011	North Dakota
2012	North Dakota
2013	Wisconsin
2014	Minnesota State
2015	Minnesota State
2016	Ferris State
2017	Michigan Tech
2018	Michigan Tech

Wins by School
Team	Wins	Years
North Dakota	8	1982, 1987, 1997, 2000, 2006, 2010, 2011, 2012
Minnesota	7	1983, 1993, 1994, 1996, 2003, 2004, 2007
Denver	5	1986, 1999, 2002, 2005, 2008
Wisconsin	5	1988, 1990, 1995, 1998, 2013
Minnesota–Duluth	3	1984, 1985, 2009
Northern Michigan	3	1989, 1991, 1992
Michigan Tech	2	2017, 2018
Minnesota State	2	2014, 2015
St. Cloud State	1	2001
Ferris State	1	2016

== See also ==
- Western Collegiate Hockey Association men's champions
