= 1993 WCHA men's ice hockey tournament =

1993 WCHA Men's ice hockey tournament
- Dates: March 12–20, 1993
- Teams: 10
- Finals site: Civic Center; St. Paul, Minnesota
- Champions: Minnesota (8th title)
- Winning coach: Doug Woog (1st title)
- MVP: Travis Richards (Minnesota)
- Attendance: 50,737
- WCHA Men's Ice Hockey Tournaments

The 1993 WCHA Men's Ice Hockey Tournament was the 34th conference playoff in league history and 41st season where a WCHA champion was crowned. The tournament was played between March 12 and March 20, 1993. First round games were played at home team campus sites while all 'Final Five' matches were held at the Civic Center in St. Paul, Minnesota. By winning the tournament, Minnesota was awarded the Broadmoor Trophy and received the WCHA's automatic bid to the 1993 NCAA Division I Men's Ice Hockey Tournament.

== Format ==
The first round of the postseason tournament featured a best-of-three games format. All nine conference teams participated in the tournament as did Alaska-Anchorage which was slated to join the WCHA as a full member the following year. Teams were seeded No. 1 through No. 9 according to their final conference standing, with a tiebreaker system used to seed teams with an identical number of points accumulated while Alaska-Anchorage was seeded tenth. The top five seeded teams each earned home ice and hosted one of the lower seeded teams.

The winners of the first round series advanced to the Civic Center for the WCHA Final Five, the collective name for the quarterfinal, semifinal, and championship rounds. The Final Five uses a single-elimination format. Teams were re-seeded No. 1 through No. 5 according to the final regular season conference standings, with the top three teams automatically advancing to the semifinals and the remaining two playing in a quarterfinal game. The semifinal pitted the top remaining seed against the winner of the quarterfinal game while the two other teams that received byes were matched against one another with the winners advancing to the championship game and the losers meeting in a Third Place contest. The Tournament Champion received an automatic bid to the 1993 NCAA Division I Men's Ice Hockey Tournament.

=== Conference standings ===
Note: GP = Games played; W = Wins; L = Losses; T = Ties; PTS = Points; GF = Goals For; GA = Goals Against

1992–93 Western Collegiate Hockey Association standings
	Conference							Overall					
	GP	W	L	T	PTS	GF	GA	GP	W	L	T	GF	GA
Minnesota-Duluth†	32	21	9	2	44	161	118	40	27	11	2	202	142
Wisconsin	32	18	11	3	39	138	107	42	24	15	3	192	146
Minnesota*	32	16	9	7	39	128	123	42	22	12	8	167	155
Michigan Tech	32	15	12	5	35	134	116	37	17	15	5	151	134
Northern Michigan	32	15	13	5	34	135	122	43	21	18	4	178	161
Denver	32	15	15	2	32	122	138	38	19	17	2	143	156
St. Cloud State	32	14	16	2	30	121	123	36	15	18	3	143	141
North Dakota	32	11	20	1	23	118	146	38	12	25	1	138	173
Colorado College	32	6	26	0	12	110	174	36	8	28	0	134	195
Championship: Minnesota † indicates conference regular season champion * indicates conference tournament champion

== Bracket ==
Teams are reseeded after the first round

First Round; March 12–13
1	Minnesota-Duluth	7	4	—
10	Alaska-Anchorage	2	0	—
2	Wisconsin	6	10	—
9	Colorado College	3	3	—
3	Minnesota	6	5*	—
8	North Dakota	4	4	—
4	Michigan Tech	3	6	—
7	St. Cloud State	1	5	—
5	Northern Michigan	5	7	—
6	Denver	3	0	—

Quarterfinal; March 18
4	Michigan Tech	3
5	Northern Michigan	4

Semifinals; March 19
1	Minnesota-Duluth	2
5	Northern Michigan	6
2	Wisconsin	2
3	Minnesota	3*

Championship; March 20
3	Minnesota	5
5	Northern Michigan	3

Note: * denotes overtime period(s)

=== Quarterfinals ===
==== (1) Minnesota-Duluth vs. (10) Alaska-Anchorage ====
March 12	Minnesota-Duluth	7 – 2	Alaska-Anchorage	Duluth Arena Auditorium

March 13	Minnesota-Duluth	4 – 0	Alaska-Anchorage	Duluth Arena Auditorium

Minnesota-Duluth won series 2–0

==== (2) Wisconsin vs. (9) Colorado College ====
March 12	Wisconsin	6 – 3	Colorado College	Dane County Coliseum

March 13	Wisconsin	10 – 3	Colorado College	Dane County Coliseum

Wisconsin won series 2–0

==== (3) Minnesota vs. (8) North Dakota ====
March 12	Minnesota	6 – 4	North Dakota	Mariucci Arena

March 13	Minnesota	5 – 4	OT	North Dakota	Mariucci Arena

Minnesota won series 2–0

==== (4) Michigan Tech vs. (7) St. Cloud State ====
March 12	Michigan Tech	3 – 1	St. Cloud State	MacInnes Student Ice Arena

March 13	Michigan Tech	6 – 5	St. Cloud State	MacInnes Student Ice Arena

Michigan Tech won series 2–0

==== (5) Northern Michigan vs. (6) Denver ====
March 12	Northern Michigan	5 – 3	Denver	Lakeview Arena

March 13	Northern Michigan	7 – 0	Denver	Lakeview Arena

Northern Michigan won series 2–0

=== Quarterfinal ===
==== (4) Michigan Tech vs. (5) Northern Michigan ====
March 18	Michigan Tech	3 – 4	Northern Michigan	Civic Center

=== Semifinals ===
==== (1) Minnesota-Duluth vs. (5) Northern Michigan ====
March 19	Minnesota-Duluth	2 – 6	Northern Michigan	Civic Center

==== (2) Wisconsin vs. (3) Minnesota ====
March 19	Wisconsin	2 – 3	OT	Minnesota	Civic Center

=== Third Place ===
==== (1) Minnesota-Duluth vs. (2) Wisconsin ====
March 20	Minnesota-Duluth	7 – 5	Wisconsin	Civic Center

=== Championship ===
==== (3) Minnesota vs. (5) Northern Michigan ====
March 20	Minnesota	5 – 3	Northern Michigan	Civic Center

== Tournament awards ==
=== All-Tournament Team ===
- F Greg Hadden (Northern Michigan)
- F Craig Johnson (Minnesota)
- F Derek Plante (Minnesota-Duluth)
- D Steve Carpenter (Northern Michigan)
- D Brett Hauer (Minnesota-Duluth)
- G Corwin Saurdiff (Northern Michigan)

=== MVP ===
- Travis Richards (Minnesota)

== See also ==
- Western Collegiate Hockey Association men's champions
