= 1996 WCHA men's ice hockey tournament =

1996 WCHA Men's ice hockey tournament
- Dates: March 1–9, 1996
- Teams: 10
- Finals site: Bradley Center; Milwaukee, Wisconsin
- Champions: Minnesota (10th title)
- Winning coach: Doug Woog (3rd title)
- MVP: Brian Bonin (Minnesota)
- Attendance: 47,304
- WCHA Men's Ice Hockey Tournaments

The 1996 WCHA Men's Ice Hockey Tournament was the 37th conference playoff in league history and 44th season where a WCHA champion was crowned. The tournament was played between March 1 and March 9, 1996. First round games were played at home team campus sites while all 'Final Five' matches were held at the Bradley Center in Milwaukee, Wisconsin. By winning the tournament, Minnesota was awarded the Broadmoor Trophy and received the WCHA's automatic bid to the 1996 NCAA Division I Men's Ice Hockey Tournament.

== Format ==
The first round of the postseason tournament featured a best-of-three games format. All ten conference teams participated in the tournament. Teams were seeded No. 1 through No. 9 according to their final conference standing, with a tiebreaker system used to seed teams with an identical number of points accumulated. The top five seeded teams each earned home ice and hosted one of the lower seeded teams.

The winners of the first round series advanced to the Bradley Center for the WCHA Final Five, the collective name for the quarterfinal, semifinal, and championship rounds. The Final Five uses a single-elimination format. Teams were re-seeded No. 1 through No. 5 according to the final regular season conference standings, with the top three teams automatically advancing to the semifinals and the remaining two playing in a quarterfinal game. The semifinal pitted the top remaining seed against the winner of the quarterfinal game while the two other teams that received byes were matched against one another with the winners advancing to the championship game and the losers meeting in a Third Place contest. The Tournament Champion received an automatic bid to the 1996 NCAA Division I Men's Ice Hockey Tournament.

=== Conference standings ===
Note: GP = Games played; W = Wins; L = Losses; T = Ties; PTS = Points; GF = Goals For; GA = Goals Against

1995–96 Western Collegiate Hockey Association standings
	Conference							Overall					
	GP	W	L	T	PTS	GF	GA	GP	W	L	T	GF	GA
Colorado College†	32	26	2	4	56	178	78	42	33	5	4	225	104
Minnesota*	32	21	9	2	44	155	95	42	30	10	2	204	121
Denver	32	17	12	3	37	120	112	39	22	14	3	149	131
Minnesota-Duluth	32	16	15	1	33	116	109	38	20	17	1	139	125
North Dakota	32	16	15	1	33	127	126	38	19	18	1	162	155
Wisconsin	32	14	15	3	31	110	123	40	17	20	3	145	160
Michigan Tech	32	12	14	6	30	108	118	42	18	18	6	145	159
St. Cloud State	32	10	18	4	24	106	132	39	13	22	4	135	153
Alaska-Anchorage	32	8	20	5	20	86	130	37	9	23	5	103	153
Northern Michigan	32	5	25	2	12	64	147	39	7	30	2	83	174
Championship: Minnesota † indicates conference regular season champion * indicates conference tournament champion Final rankings: USA Today/USA Hockey Magazine Top 10 Poll

== Bracket ==
Teams are reseeded after the first round

First Round; March 1–3
1	Colorado College	4	6	—
10	Northern Michigan	3	1	—
2	Minnesota	6	7	—
9	Alaska-Anchorage	4	1	—
3	Denver	1	6	0
8	St. Cloud State	3	4	4
4	Minnesota-Duluth	4	3	—
7	Michigan Tech	5	4	—
5	North Dakota	5	4	—
6	Wisconsin	6	5	—

Quarterfinal; March 7
7	Michigan Tech	4*
8	St. Cloud State	3

Semifinals; March 8
1	Colorado College	3
7	Michigan Tech	4
2	Minnesota	4*
6	Wisconsin	3

Championship; March 9
2	Minnesota	7
7	Michigan Tech	2

Note: * denotes overtime period(s)

=== Quarterfinals ===
==== (1) Colorado College vs. (10) Northern Michigan ====
March 1	Colorado College	4 – 3	Northern Michigan	Cadet Ice Arena

March 2	Colorado College	6 – 1	Northern Michigan	Cadet Ice Arena

Colorado College won series 2–0

==== (2) Minnesota vs. (9) Alaska-Anchorage ====
March 1	Minnesota	6 – 4	Alaska-Anchorage	Mariucci Arena

March 2	Minnesota	7 – 1	Alaska-Anchorage	Mariucci Arena

Minnesota won series 2–0

==== (3) Denver vs. (8) St. Cloud State ====
March 1	Denver	1 – 3	St. Cloud State	DU Arena

March 2	Denver	6 – 4	St. Cloud State	DU Arena

March 3	Denver	0 – 4	St. Cloud State	DU Arena

St. Cloud State won series 2–1

==== (4) Minnesota-Duluth vs. (7) Michigan Tech ====
March 1	Minnesota-Duluth	4 – 5	Michigan Tech	DECC

March 2	Minnesota-Duluth	3 – 4	Michigan Tech	DECC

Michigan Tech won series 2–0

==== (5) North Dakota vs. (6) Wisconsin ====
March 1	North Dakota	5 – 6	Wisconsin	Ralph Engelstad Arena

March 2	North Dakota	4 – 5	Wisconsin	Ralph Engelstad Arena

Wisconsin won series 2–0

=== Quarterfinal ===
==== (7) Michigan Tech vs. (8) St. Cloud State ====
March 7	Michigan Tech	4 – 3	OT	St. Cloud State	Bradley Center

=== Semifinals ===
==== (1) Colorado College vs. (7) Michigan Tech ====
March 8	Colorado College	3 – 4	Michigan Tech	Bradley Center

==== (2) Minnesota vs. (6) Wisconsin ====
March 8	Minnesota	4 – 3	OT	Wisconsin	Bradley Center

=== Third Place ===
==== (1) Colorado College vs. (6) Wisconsin ====
March 9	Colorado College	6 – 4	Wisconsin	Bradley Center

=== Championship ===
==== (2) Minnesota vs. (7) Michigan Tech ====
March 9	Minnesota	7 – 2	Michigan Tech	Bradley Center

== Tournament awards ==
=== All-Tournament Team ===
- F Brian Bonin* (Minnesota)
- F Bret Meyers (Michigan Tech)
- F Jeff Mikesch (Michigan Tech)
- D Mike Crowley (Minnesota)
- D Scott Swanson (Colorado College)
- G Kirk Daubenspeck (Wisconsin)

* Most Valuable Player(s)

== See also ==
- Western Collegiate Hockey Association men's champions
