= MacNaughton Cup =

American collegiate ice hockey trophy

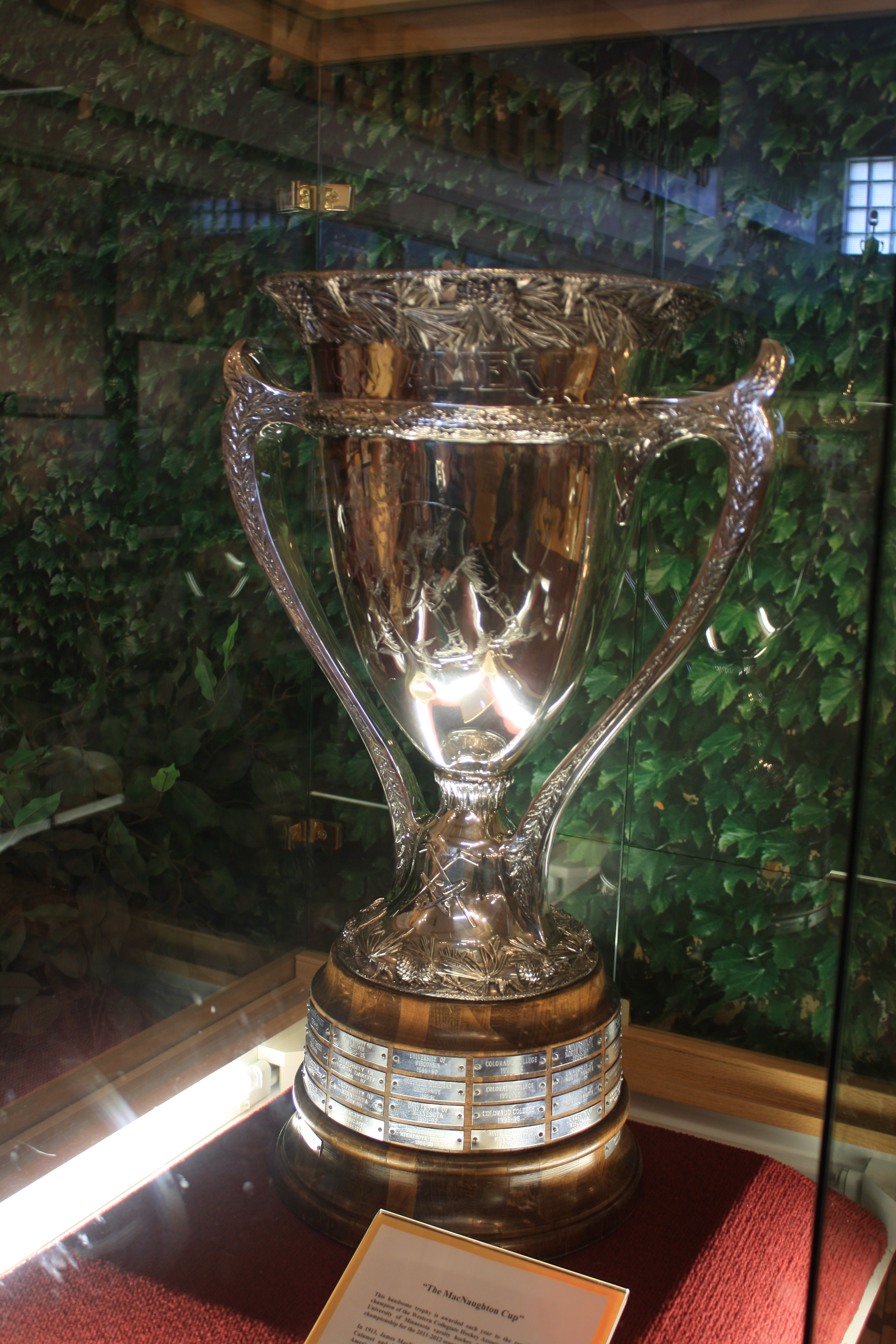
- Sport: Ice hockey
- Awarded for: CCHA Regular Season Champion

History
- First award: 1913
- Most wins: North Dakota (14 wins)
- Most recent: Minnesota State (10th win)

The MacNaughton Cup is a trophy awarded annually to the regular season conference champion of the Central Collegiate Hockey Association (CCHA). The trophy is named after James MacNaughton of Calumet, Michigan, who was a supporter of amateur ice hockey. The Cup is hand crafted of pure silver and stands almost three-feet high and weighs nearly 40 pounds.

== History ==
In 1913, MacNaughton purchased a cup trophy for $2,000 (equivalent to $47,000 in 2024) and donated it to the President of the American Hockey Association, which was to be awarded to the league's champion at the end of the season. The MacNaughton Cup remained with the American Hockey Association until 1932. From 1933 to 1950, the Cup was given to semi-pro and intermediate hockey teams in Michigan's Copper Country.

In 1951, the MacNaughton family arranged to have the Cup awarded to the newly founded Midwest Collegiate Hockey League (MCHL), a precursor to the WCHA. The MCHL was composed of Michigan Tech, Colorado College, University of Denver, University of Michigan, Michigan State University, University of Minnesota, and University of North Dakota. Michigan Tech became the trustee for the Cup. In the original spirit of the trophy, the league decided to award the trophy to its regular season champion.

In 1953, the MCHL became the Western Intercollegiate Hockey League (WIHL). The Cup remained a part of the WIHL until the league was disbanded in March 1958. There was no league play for the 1958–59 season, and for the 1959–60 season the seven teams resumed competition under the new name of the Western Collegiate Hockey Association.

From the 1961–62 through the 1964–65 seasons, the Cup was awarded to the WCHA's playoff tournament champion instead of the regular season champion, but the WCHA resumed awarding the Cup to the regular season champion again for the start of the 1965–66 season through the 1981–82 season.

Michigan Tech left the WCHA to join the Central Collegiate Hockey Association (CCHA) for the 1981–82 season. Since Michigan Tech is the trustee of the Cup, the Cup went to the CCHA. The Broadmoor Trophy was created as a replacement and awarded to the regular season champion until Michigan Tech returned to the WCHA for the start of the 1984–85 season. The MacNaughton Cup also returned and continued to be awarded to the regular season champion through the final WCHA men's season in 2020–21.

On May 18, 2021, it was announced that the trophy would be returning to the re-formed CCHA, beginning with the 2021–22 season.

== Champions ==
North Dakota's 14 MacNaughton Cups led the WCHA and is the most MacNaughton Cups won by any team. Minnesota State has won the most MacNaughton Cups of any of the current CCHA members, with 10. Bowling Green was the first school to win the cup 3 straight times. They were later supplanted by Minnesota State, who had 6 consecutive wins from 2018 to 2023.

=== Winners ===
Year	Champion
American Hockey Association champions
1913–14	Cleveland Athletic Club
1914–15	American Soo Hockey Club
1915–16	St. Paul Athletic Club
1917–1919	not awarded
1919–20	Canadian Soo Athletic Club
1920–21	Eveleth Minnesota Hockey Club
1921–22	Canadian Soo Athletic Club
1923–1926	not awarded
1926–27	Calumet Hawks
1927–28	Calumet Hawks
1928–29	Ironwood Rangers
1929–30	Hancock Hockey Club
1930–31	Hancock Eagles
1931–32	Soo Bulldogs
Michigan's Western Upper Peninsula teams
1932–33	Calumet (Pine Street) Trojans
1933–34	Calumet Wolverine AC
1934–35	Painesdale Athletic Club
1935–36	Calumet Aristocrats
1936–37	Painesdale Panthers Athletic Club
1937–38	Calumet-Laurium Olympics
1938–39	Portage Lake Elks
1939–40	Calumet-Laurium Chevs
1940–41	Soo Indians
1942–1949	not awarded
1949–50	Soo Martins
1950–51	Calumet-Laurium-Keweenaw Radars
Midwest Collegiate Hockey League regular season
1951–52	Colorado College
1952–53	Minnesota/Michigan
Western Intercollegiate Hockey League regular season
1953–54	Minnesota
1954–55	Colorado College
1955–56	Michigan
1956–57	Colorado College
1957–58	North Dakota/Denver
1958–59	not awarded
Western Collegiate Hockey Association regular season
1959–60	Denver
1960–61	Denver
Western Collegiate Hockey Association tournament
1961–62	Michigan Tech
1962–63	Denver
1963–64	Denver
1964–65	Michigan Tech
Western Collegiate Hockey Association regular season
1965–66	Michigan Tech
1966–67	North Dakota
1967–68	Denver
1968–69	Michigan Tech
1969–70	Minnesota
1970–71	Michigan Tech
1971–72	Denver
1972–73	Denver
1973–74	Michigan Tech
1974–75	Minnesota
1975–76	Michigan Tech
1976–77	Wisconsin
1977–78	Denver
1978–79	North Dakota
1979–80	North Dakota
1980–81	Minnesota
Central Collegiate Hockey Association regular season
1981–82	Bowling Green
1982–83	Bowling Green
1983–84	Bowling Green
Western Collegiate Hockey Association regular season
1984–85	Minnesota-Duluth
1985–86	Denver
1986–87	North Dakota
1987–88	Minnesota
1988–89	Minnesota
1989–90	Wisconsin
1990–91	Northern Michigan
1991–92	Minnesota
1992–93	Minnesota-Duluth
1993–94	Colorado College
1994–95	Colorado College
1995–96	Colorado College
1996–97	Minnesota/North Dakota
1997–98	North Dakota
1998–99	North Dakota
1999–2000	Wisconsin
2000–01	North Dakota
2001–02	Denver
2002–03	Colorado College
2003–04	North Dakota
2004–05	Colorado College/Denver
2005–06	Minnesota
2006–07	Minnesota
2007–08	Colorado College
2008–09	North Dakota
2009–10	Denver
2010–11	North Dakota
2011–12	Minnesota
2012–13	St. Cloud/Minnesota
2013–14	Ferris State
2014–15	Minnesota State
2015–16	Minnesota State/Michigan Tech
2016-17	Bemidji State
2017-18	Minnesota State
2018-19	Minnesota State
2019-20	Minnesota State
2020-21	Minnesota State
Central Collegiate Hockey Association regular season
2021-22	Minnesota State
2022-23	Minnesota State
2023-24	Bemidji State
2024-25	Minnesota State
2025-26	Minnesota State

=== Wins by team (college era) ===
Team	Wins	Years
North Dakota	14	1957–58^{†}, 1962–63^{†}, 1964–65^{†}, 1966–67, 1978–79, 1979–80, 1986–87, 1996–97^{†}, 1997–98, 1998–99, 2000–01, 2003–04, 2008–09, 2010–11
Denver	13	1957–58^{†}, 1959–60, 1960–61, 1962–63^{†}, 1963–64, 1967–68, 1971–72, 1972–73, 1977–78, 1985–86, 2001–02, 2004–05^{†}, 2009–10
Minnesota	13	1952–53^{†}, 1953–54, 1969–70, 1974–75, 1980–81, 1987–88, 1988–89, 1991–92, 1996–97^{†}, 2005–06, 2006–07, 2011–12, 2012–13^{†}
*Minnesota State	10	2014–15, 2015-16^{†}, 2017–18, 2018-19, 2019-20, 2020-21, 2021-22, 2022-23, 2024-25, 2025-26
Colorado College	9	1951–52, 1954–55, 1956–57, 1993–94, 1994–95, 1995–96, 2002–03, 2004–05^{†}, 2007–08
*Michigan Tech	8	1961–62, 1964–65^{†},1965–66, 1968–69, 1970–71, 1973–74, 1975–76, 2015-16^{†}
Wisconsin	3	1976–77, 1989–90, 1999–2000
*Bowling Green	3	1981–82, 1982–83, 1983–84
Michigan	2	1952–53^{†}, 1955–56
Minnesota–Duluth	2	1984–85, 1992–93
*Bemidji State	2	2016-17, 2023-24
*Northern Michigan	1	1990–91
St. Cloud State	1	2012–13^{†}
*Ferris State	1	2013–14

† shared title
* Currently compete in CCHA

== See also ==
- Western Collegiate Hockey Association men's champions
