= 1978 WCHA men's ice hockey tournament =

1978 WCHA Men's ice hockey tournament
- Dates: March 10–15, 1978
- Teams: 8
- Finals site: Dane County Coliseum; Madison, Wisconsin; DU Arena; Denver, Colorado
- Champions: Wisconsin† (5th title); Colorado College‡ (1st title)
- Winning coach: Bob Johnson (5th title); Jeff Sauer (1st title)
- WCHA Men's Ice Hockey Tournaments

The 1978 WCHA Men's Ice Hockey Tournament was the 19th conference playoff in league history. The tournament was played between March 10 and March 15, 1978. All games were played at home team campus sites, including each of the two regional final series. By winning the regional tournaments, both Wisconsin and Colorado College were invited to participate in the 1978 NCAA Division I Men's Ice Hockey Tournament.

Though not official designations, Wisconsin is considered as the East Regional Champion† and Colorado College as the West Regional Champion‡.

== Format ==
The top eight teams in the WCHA, according to their final conference standings, were eligible for the tournament and were seeded No. 1 through No. 8. In the first round the first and eighth seeds, the second and seventh seeds, the third and sixth seeds and the fourth and fifth seeds were matched in two-game series where the school that scored the higher number of goals was declared the winner. After the first round the remaining teams were reseeded No. 1 through No. 4 according to their final conference standings and advanced to the second round. In the second round the first and fourth seeds and the second and third seeds competed in an additional two-game, total goal series with the winners of each being declared as co-conference champions.

=== Conference standings ===
Note: GP = Games played; W = Wins; L = Losses; T = Ties; PTS = Points; GF = Goals For; GA = Goals Against

1977–78 Western Collegiate Hockey Association standings
| | Conference | | | | | | | Overall | | | | | |
| | GP | W | L | T | PTS | GF | GA | GP | W | L | T | GF | GA |
|---|---|---|---|---|---|---|---|---|---|---|---|---|---|
| Denver† | 32 | 27 | 5 | 0 | 54 | 192 | 112 | 40 | 33 | 6 | 1 | 235 | 140 |
| Wisconsin* | 32 | 21 | 9 | 2 | 44 | 127 | 113 | 43 | 28 | 12 | 3 | 214 | 149 |
| Michigan Tech | 32 | 21 | 11 | 0 | 42 | 150 | 123 | 40 | 25 | 14 | 1 | 184 | 157 |
| Minnesota | 32 | 18 | 13 | 1 | 37 | 143 | 134 | 38 | 22 | 14 | 2 | 171 | 150 |
| Colorado College* | 32 | 13 | 19 | 0 | 26 | 162 | 172 | 41 | 18 | 22 | 1 | 212 | 218 |
| North Dakota | 32 | 13 | 19 | 0 | 26 | 146 | 167 | 38 | 15 | 22 | 1 | 172 | 192 |
| Minnesota-Duluth | 32 | 12 | 19 | 1 | 25 | 135 | 155 | 37 | 14 | 22 | 1 | 155 | 182 |
| Notre Dame | 32 | 12 | 19 | 1 | 25 | 117 | 147 | 38 | 12 | 24 | 2 | 137 | 186 |
| Michigan | 32 | 12 | 19 | 1 | 25 | 149 | 175 | 36 | 15 | 20 | 1 | 169 | 192 |
| Michigan State | 32 | 7 | 23 | 2 | 16 | 119 | 182 | 36 | 7 | 27 | 2 | 130 | 201 |
Championship: Wisconsin, Colorado College † indicates conference regular season champion * indicates conference tournament champion

== Bracket ==
Teams are reseeded after the first round

First Round; March 10–11
1 | Denver | 6 | 7
8 | Notre Dame | 6 | 1
2 | Wisconsin | 9 | 5
7 | Minnesota-Duluth | 2 | 4
3 | Michigan Tech | 2 | 3*
6 | North Dakota | 2 | 2
4 | Minnesota | 3 | 4
5 | Colorado College | 3 | 5

Second Round; March 14–15
1 | Denver | 3 | 4
5 | Colorado College | 6 | 3
2 | Wisconsin | 4 | 7
3 | Michigan Tech | 3 | 4

Note: * denotes overtime period(s)

=== First round ===
==== (1) Denver vs. (8) Notre Dame ====
| March 10 | North Dakota | 6 – 6 | Notre Dame | DU Arena |

| March 11 | North Dakota | 7 – 1 | Notre Dame | DU Arena |

| Denver won series 13–7 |

==== (2) Wisconsin vs. (7) Minnesota-Duluth ====
| March 10 | Wisconsin | 9 – 2 | Minnesota-Duluth | Dane County Coliseum |

| March 11 | Wisconsin | 5 – 4 | Minnesota-Duluth | Dane County Coliseum |

| Wisconsin won series 14–6 |

==== (3) Michigan Tech vs. (6) North Dakota ====
| March 10 | Michigan Tech | 2 – 2 | North Dakota | Student Ice Arena |

| March 11 | Michigan Tech | 3 – 2 | OT | North Dakota | Student Ice Arena |

| Michigan Tech won series 5–4 |

==== (4) Minnesota vs. (5) Colorado College ====
| March 10 | Minnesota | 3 – 3 | Colorado College | Williams Arena |

| March 11 | Minnesota | 4 – 5 | Colorado College | Williams Arena |

| Colorado College won series 8–7 |

=== Second round ===
==== (1) Denver vs. (5) Colorado College ====
| March 14 | Denver | 3 – 6 | Colorado College | DU Arena |

| March 15 | Denver | 4 – 3 | Colorado College | DU Arena |

| Colorado College won series 9–7 |

==== (2) Wisconsin vs. (3) Michigan Tech ====
| March 14 | Wisconsin | 4 – 3 | Michigan Tech | Dane County Coliseum |

| March 15 | Wisconsin | 7 – 4 | Michigan Tech | Dane County Coliseum |

| Wisconsin won series 11–7 |

== Tournament awards ==
None

== See also ==
- Western Collegiate Hockey Association men's champions
