= Doug Woog =

American ice hockey coach and broadcaster (1944–2019)

Biographical details
- Born: January 28, 1944; Saint Paul, Minnesota, U.S.
- Died: December 14, 2019 (aged 75); Lakeville, Minnesota, U.S.
- Education: University of Minnesota

Playing career
- 1963–1966: Minnesota
- 1966–1967: U.S. Nationals
- 1967–1968: Minnesota Nationals
- 1968: US National Team
- Position: Center

Coaching career (HC unless noted)
- 1971–1972: Minnesota Junior Stars
- 1973–1977: St. Paul Vulcans
- 1982: US World Junior Team (assistant)
- 1984: US Olympic Team (assistant)
- 1985: US World Junior Team
- 1985–1999: Minnesota

Head coaching record
- Overall: 388–187–40 (.663)
- Tournaments: 21–17 (.553)

Accomplishments and honors

Championships
- 1988 WCHA Regular Season Champion; 1989 WCHA regular season champion 1992 WCHA regular season champion 1993 WCHA Tournament champion 1994 WCHA tournament champion 1995 WCHA regular season champion 1996 WCHA tournament champion 1997 WCHA regular season champion

Awards
- 1990 WCHA Coach of the Year; 2002 US Hockey Hall of Fame; 2008 John MacInnes Award

Douglas William Woog (January 28, 1944 – December 14, 2019) was an American ice hockey coach and broadcaster. He was a member of the United States Hockey Hall of Fame, inducted in 2002. Woog was coach of the University of Minnesota Golden Gophers ice hockey team from 1985 to 1999. He was assistant coach of the 1984 U.S. Olympic ice hockey team.

He was a broadcaster for Gopher hockey games for FSN North through the 2009 to 2010 season. In 2008, he was awarded the John MacInnes Award for his work in amateur hockey in the United States. Woog died December 14, 2019.

== Playing career ==
Woog played high school hockey for the South St. Paul Packers. Woog was a Minnesota first team all-state player three of his four years at South St. Paul, leading the Packers to four state tournament berths. Woog was the Athletes and Activity Honoree of South St. Paul high school in 1962. He was named to the Minnesota state all-tournament team three of four years and was the tournament's leading scorer in 1962. Woog's No. 7 South St. Paul High School Packer jersey was retired on February 6, 2010. Woog played for the University of Minnesota from 1963 to 1966. In his three years (freshmen were not allowed to play) with Minnesota, Woog was selected as a first team All-American, named team captain and named MVP in his senior year. Woog was a member of the U.S. national team in 1967.

== Coaching ==
After finishing his playing career Woog began coaching in Minnesota, first, for the 1968–69 season as coach for the Hopkins West Jr. High School hockey team located in Minnetonka, Minnesota where he was a Social Studies teacher. Then as an assistant with the Minnesota Junior Stars under former teammate and fellow Minnesota alumnus Herb Brooks. in 1973 Woog became the head coach for the St. Paul Vulcans and was the only bench boss the team had in the four years it spent in the MWJHL. In the early 1980s Woog served in many capacities for the United States men's national ice hockey team, including as an assistant at the 1984 Winter Olympics, before being named as the head coach for Minnesota. In his first twelve seasons the Golden Gophers reached the NCAA tournament each year (a record for the start of a career) posting six 30+ win seasons, winning five WCHA titles, three conference tournament titles and made the 1989 NCAA Tournament Final. While the ultimate prize eluded him Woog was one of the most successful coaches in the history of the NCAA when he retired in 1999. In 2015, in his honor they named formerly known, Wakota Arena, to Doug Woog Arena in his home town of South St. Paul.

== Head coaching record ==
=== College ===
Record table
Season	Team	Overall	Conference	Standing	Postseason
Minnesota Golden Gophers (WCHA) (1985–1999)
1985–86	Minnesota	35–13–0	24–10–0	2nd	NCAA third-place game (win)
1986–87	Minnesota	34–14–1	25–9–1	2nd	NCAA third-place game (win)
1987–88	Minnesota	34–10–0	28–7–0	1st	NCAA third-place game (loss)
1988–89	Minnesota	34–11–3	27–6–2	1st	NCAA runner-up
1989–90	Minnesota	28–16–2	17–9–2	2nd	NCAA Quarterfinals
1990–91	Minnesota	30–10–5	22–5–5	2nd	NCAA Quarterfinals
1991–92	Minnesota	33–11–0	26–6–0	1st	NCAA West regional semifinals
1992–93	Minnesota	22–12–8	16–9–7	t-2nd	NCAA East regional semifinals
1993–94	Minnesota	25–13–4	18–10–4	2nd	NCAA Frozen Four
1994–95	Minnesota	25–14–5	16–11–5	4th	NCAA Frozen Four
1995–96	Minnesota	29–10–2†	21–9–2†	2nd	NCAA West regional semifinals
1996–97	Minnesota	27–12–1†	20–9–1†	t-1st	NCAA West regional semifinals
1997–98	Minnesota	17–22–0	12–16–0	6th	WCHA first round
1998–99	Minnesota	15–19–9	10–12–6	5th	WCHA third-place game (loss)
Minnesota:		388–187–40	282–128–35		
Total:		388–187–40			
National champion Postseason invitational champion Conference regular season champion Conference regular season and conference tournament champion Division regular season champion Division regular season and conference tournament champion Conference tournament champion

†Mike Guentzel served as interim coach for three games while Woog was suspended on two occasions

== Awards and honors ==
Award	Year
All-WCHA First Team	1964–65
AHCA West All-American	1964–65

Woog has also had the honor of having Wakota arena in South St. Paul, Minnesota renamed to Doug Woog arena. Along with that, South St Paul Secondary School and the Hockey Program retired Woog's number 7.

Awards and achievements
Preceded by Rick Comley	WCHA Coach of the Year; 1989–90	Succeeded by Rick Comley
