= Ralph Engelstad Arena (1972) =

Multi-purpose arena in Grand Forks, North Dakota

Coordinates: 47.9201673°N 97.062664°W

- "The Old Ralph"
- Interactive map of Ralph Engelstad Arena
- Former names: "Ralph Engelstad Arena" "Winter Sports Center"
- Location: Grand Forks, North Dakota
- Owner: University of North Dakota
- Capacity: 6,067
- Surface: 200' x 85' (hockey)

Construction
- Groundbreaking: July 22, 1971
- Opened: November 10, 1972
- Closed: October 5, 2001
- Demolished: Summer 2013
- Cost: US$1.9 million ($14.6 million in 2025 dollars)

Tenants
- North Dakota Fighting Sioux hockey (NCAA) (1972–2001)

Ralph Engelstad Arena (The Ralph) was a 6,067-seat multi-purpose arena located on the University of North Dakota (UND) campus in Grand Forks, North Dakota. It was home to the University of North Dakota Fighting Sioux hockey team, and was the host of the 1983 Frozen Four tournament. It was originally named the Winter Sports Center, but was renamed in 1988 to honor alumnus Ralph Engelstad. The arena closed in 2001 and was replaced with the new $104 million Ralph Engelstad Arena on the north end of campus.

University of North Dakota Director of Athletics Brian Faison announced that demolition of the old Ralph Engelstad Arena east of Memorial Stadium has been completed. Construction has begun on Phase I of the UND Athletics High Performance Center, an indoor practice and competition facility for UND Athletics.

Preceded by Providence Civic Center; Providence, Rhode Island	Host of the Frozen Four; 1983	Succeeded by Olympic Center; Lake Placid, New York
