= St. Paul Civic Center =

Indoor arena in Saint Paul, Minnesota, US

- Interactive map of St. Paul Civic Center
- Address: 143 W 4th St; Saint Paul, MN 55102
- Location: Downtown Saint Paul
- Owner: City of Saint Paul
- Capacity: 16,000

Construction
- Opened: January 1, 1973
- Closed: April 9, 1998
- Demolished: May 1998
- Cost: $19 million ($146 million in 2025 dollars)

Tenants
- Minnesota Fighting Saints (WHA) (1973–77); Minnesota High School Hockey Tournament (MSHSL) (1976–98); Minnesota Moose (IHL) (1994–96)

The St. Paul Civic Center was an indoor arena located in Saint Paul, Minnesota. The arena opened in 1973 and was closed and demolished in 1998. It once sat near the Ordway Music Theater and the Roy Wilkins Auditorium. The Grand Casino Arena was built on the former site of the arena.

== History ==
The arena opened on January 1, 1973, and had seating capacity of approximately 16,000 for hockey. The arena could be expanded up to 17,800 for concerts and other non-sporting events. The Civic Center was the home of both iterations of the Minnesota Fighting Saints of the WHA—the first from 1973 to 1976 and the second from 1976 to 1977. The boys' state high school hockey and basketball tournaments were also held at the Civic Center as well as three NCAA men's Frozen Four national ice hockey championships. The arena was also the home of Verne Gagne's American Wrestling Association (AWA).

The arena was unique in North America in that the hockey dasher boards were made of clear acrylic glass from the shelf all the way down to the ice. This was because the arena's seating configuration was round, and the closest seats between the blue lines were not flush against the boards.

Previously not an issue when dasher board advertising was rare, the clear boards made for better sightlines for most spectators seated between the blue lines, since the seating angles in the Civic Center were shallow. When the Minnesota Moose of the International Hockey League played their two seasons, they were replaced with standard white opaque boards to allow advertising. The new boards were disadvantageous to the previous seating arrangements, and with the Moose's quick departure to Winnipeg, showed the arena was outdated for the state's most popular sport only 21 years after opening, much less National Hockey League standards.

== Popular culture ==
On June 28, 1984, Bruce Springsteen and The E Street Band, actress Courteney Cox and 200 extras filmed the Brian De Palma-directed music video for "Dancing in the Dark" at the arena, one day before Springsteen's 1984 Born in the U.S.A. Tour formally opened at the arena.

The song "I Bought a Headache" from The Replacements' album Sorry Ma, Forgot to Take Out the Trash is about regretting purchasing an $8.50 ticket to a rock concert that is so loud it makes his head hurt. Billy Joel recorded and released a live version of his song, "Streetlife Serenader". The song was recorded from a 1980 concert held at the arena.

== Concerts ==
St Paul's was a popular venue and hosted many concerts including six by the Grateful Dead, one each in the years 1973, 1977, 1978, 1981, 1982, and 1983.

== Noted performers ==
- ABBA
- Aerosmith
- Alice Cooper
- Bad Company
- Barry Manilow
- Bee Gees
- Billy Joel
- Billy Squier
- Blue Öyster Cult
- Bob Dylan
- Bob Segar
- Boston
- Bruce Springsteen
- The Clash
- David Bowie
- Depeche Mode
- Debbie Gibson
- Dinosaur Jr.
- The Doobie Brothers
- Duran Duran
- Electric Light Orchestra
- Elton John
- Elvis Presley
- Eric Clapton
- Frank Zappa
- The Firm
- Foghat
- Foreigner
- Grateful Dead
- The Guess Who
- The Jackson 5
- Jethro Tull
- John Denver
- Journey
- Judas Priest
- The Kinks
- Kiss
- Led Zeppelin
- Luciano Pavarotti
- Lynyrd Skynyrd
- Mason Proffit
- Madonna
- Neil Young
- Peter Frampton
- Phish
- Prince
- Queen
- The Ramones
- The Rolling Stones
- Rush
- Santana
- Stevie Wonder
- Styx
- Supertramp
- Ted Nugent
- Tim McGraw
- Tina Turner
- U2
- Van Halen
- The Who
- Wings
- Yes
- ZZ Top

Preceded by Olympic Center; Lake Placid, New York	Host of the men's Frozen Four; 1989	Succeeded by Joe Louis Arena; Detroit, Michigan
Preceded by Joe Louis Arena; Detroit	Host of the men's Frozen Four; 1991	Succeeded by Knickerbocker Arena; Albany, New York
Preceded by Bradley Center; Milwaukee	Host of the men's Frozen Four; 1994	Succeeded by Providence Civic Center; Providence, Rhode Island
