= WCHA men's ice hockey tournament =

WCHA Tournament (defunct)
- College hockey conference championship
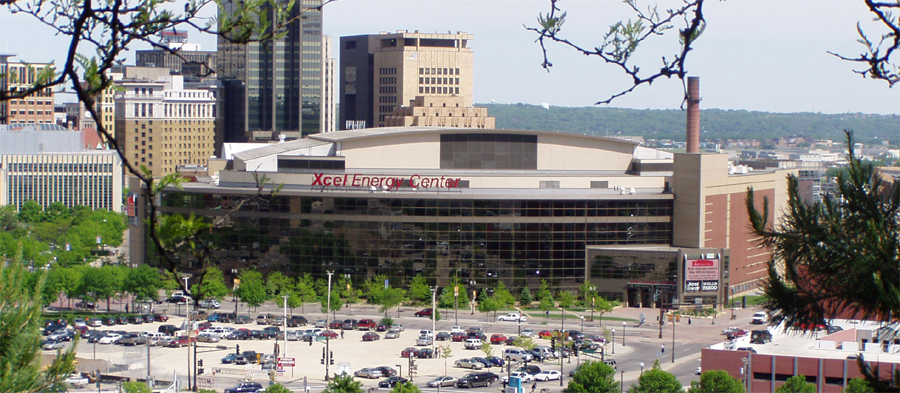
- The Xcel Energy Center hosted the tournament from 2001 to 2013, then again in 2015. Its fourteen years hosting are the most years of any neutral site.
- Sport: College ice hockey
- Conference: Western Collegiate Hockey Association
- Number of teams: 8
- Format: Single-elimination; best two-of-three first round, single-game semifinals and final
- Played: 1959–2021
- Last contest: 2021 WCHA Tournament
- Current champion: Lake Superior State Lakers (first win)
- Most championships: Denver Pioneers (fifteen wins)
- Winner trophy: Broadmoor Trophy; Jeff Sauer WCHA Championship Trophy

The WCHA Men's Tournament was the conference tournament for the men's division of the Western Collegiate Hockey Association (WCHA), an NCAA Division I men's ice hockey conference that originally operated from 1951 to 2021. The tournament was also referred to as the WCHA Final Five, the moniker for the tournament's closing rounds. The winner of the tournament received an automatic berth into the NCAA Tournament. From 1985 to 2018, the winner of the tournament received the Broadmoor Trophy, before that trophy was retired in favor of the Jeff Sauer WCHA Championship Trophy.

== History ==
The Western Collegiate Hockey Association (WCHA) is the oldest active NCAA Division I ice hockey-only conference beginning in 1959–60, and based in Denver, Colorado. At the conclusion of each regular season, it held a tournament to determine its conference champion(s). The tournament has had many variations over the course of its history, starting with four teams and naming two regional champions. The modern format of the tournament, where only one champion was crowned, wasn't codified until 1981–82 after four teams left to join the CCHA and the NCAA began to offer automatic bids to the National Tournament rather than inviting finals participants.

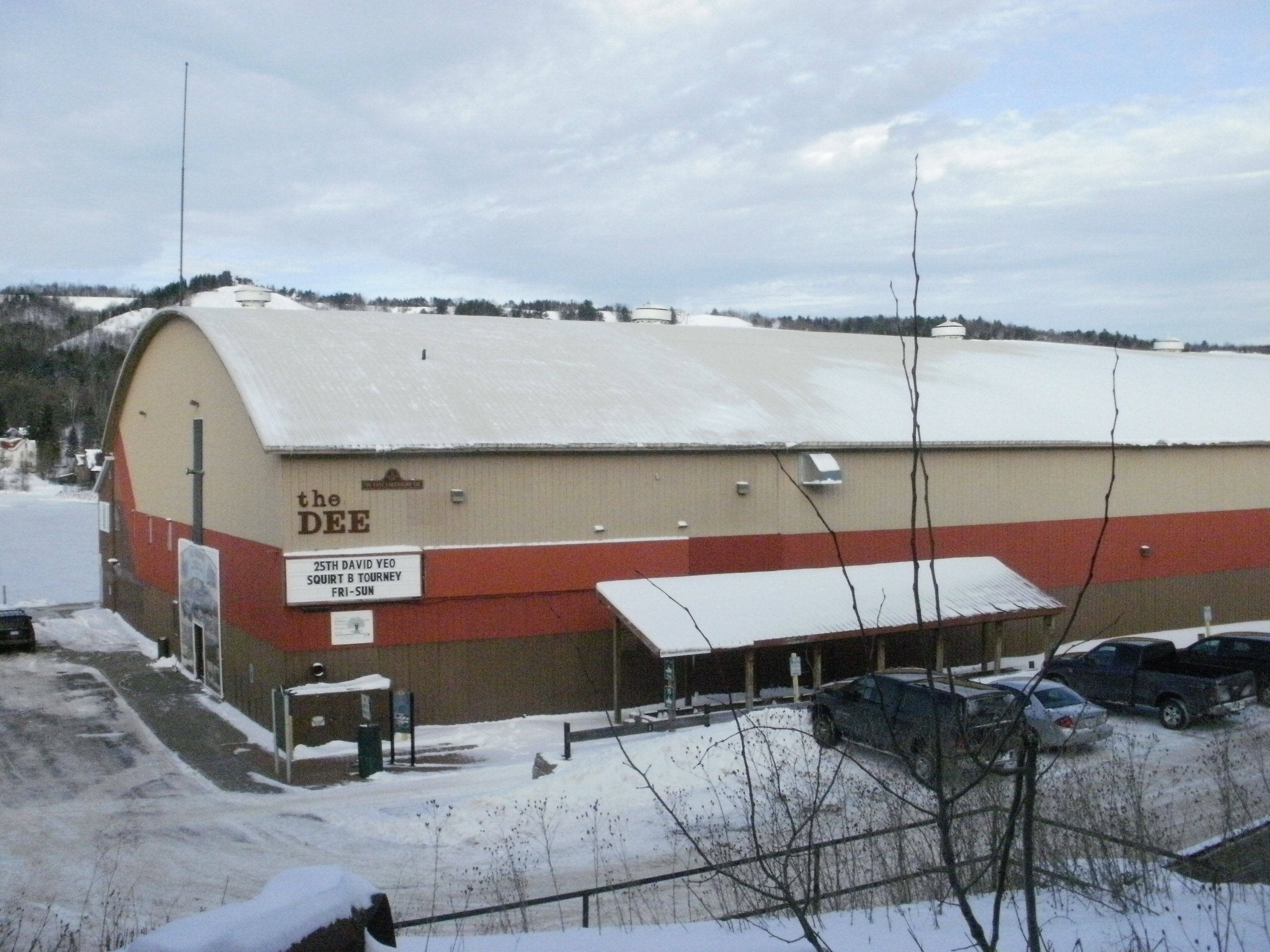
Dee Stadium hosted a championship game in the tournament's first season.

Denver has won the most WCHA championships with 15. Murray Armstrong has won the most titles (10), all with Denver, and appeared in the second most title games. John MacInnes has appeared in the most title games (15) and won the second most, all with Michigan Tech. These numbers are, however, misleading as the WCHA had named two tournament champions for most of its first 22 years rather than offering a game(s) to decide a single champion, the era that both Armstrong and MacInnes coached in. Had this policy continued unabated Doug Woog would be tied with Armstrong for most titles as well as winning 5 consecutive (1990–1994) and appearing in 12 consecutive finals (1986–1997).

Following the 2012–13 season, college hockey underwent a major conference realignment, leaving the WCHA with an almost completely new set of teams. In 2019, seven members of the men's WCHA announced they would be leaving the WCHA to form a new, revived CCHA conference. The 2020–21 season would be the last for the current iteration of the WCHA, with Lake Superior State winning the final WCHA men's tournament.

== Championship Round Performance ==
Game records may not add up to the amount of championship round appearances due to the championship round being multiple games in certain years.

School	Championships	Appearances	Record	Pct.
Denver	15	23	22–8–2	.719
Minnesota	14	27	17–21–4	.452
Wisconsin	12	14	17–2–3	.841
North Dakota	11	24	15–15–3	.500
Michigan Tech	11	19	15–11–2	.571
Northern Michigan	3	6	3–3–0	.500
Minnesota–Duluth	3	5	4–5–0	.444
Minnesota State	3	4	3–1	.750
Michigan State	2	6	3–6–1	.350
Colorado College	1	9	2–11	.154
St. Cloud State	1	4	1–3	.250
Ferris State	1	2	1–1	.500
Lake Superior State	1	1	1–0	1.000
Michigan	0	8	0–12–2	.071
Bowling Green State	0	2	0–2	.000
Notre Dame	0	2	0–3–1	.125

== Location of WCHA Tournaments ==
- 1961–1987: Campus Sites
- 1988–1993, 1995, 1997: St. Paul Civic Center, St. Paul, MN
- 1994, 1996, 1998: Bradley Center, Milwaukee, WI
- 1999–2000: Target Center, Minneapolis, MN
- 2001–2013, 2015: Xcel Energy Center, St. Paul, MN
- 2014, 2016: Van Andel Arena, Grand Rapids, MI
- 2017–2020: Campus Sites
- 2021: Mayo Clinic Health System Event Center, Mankato, MN (Note: Semifinal and Championship rounds held at Minnesota State due to COVID-19 Pandemic, despite Minnesota State not appearing in the Championship round.)
