= 1979–80 North Dakota Fighting Sioux men's ice hockey season =

National champion WCHA, champion WCHA tournament, co-champion 1980 NCAA tournament, champion
- Conference: 1st WCHA
- Home ice: Winter Sports Center

Record
- Overall: 31–8–1
- Conference: 21–6–1
- Home: 20–2–0
- Road: 9–6–1
- Neutral: 2–0–0

Coaches and captains
- Head coach: John Gasparini
- Assistant coaches: Jim Nelson; Rick Wilson
- Captain: Mark Taylor
- Alternate captain(s): Marc Chorney; Erwin Martens

The 1979–80 North Dakota Fighting Sioux men's ice hockey team represented the University of North Dakota in college ice hockey. In its 2nd year under head coach John Gasparini the team compiled a 31–8–1 record and reached the NCAA tournament for the eighth time. The Fighting Sioux defeated Northern Michigan 5–2 to win the championship game at the Providence Civic Center in Providence, Rhode Island.

== Season ==
=== Early season ===
After finishing as the national runner-up in John Gasparini's first year as head coach, North Dakota was hoping to continue their renaissance after a decade of futility. The Fighting Sioux began their season with a four-game home stand and did not look particularly strong, splitting both weekends against Colorado College and Michigan Tech. After taking both road games against a bad Denver team, UND hosted St. Lawrence and won both games to push their record to 6–2.

After splitting a road series against Michigan State, North Dakota hosted Minnesota in a rematch of last year's championship game, winning both games and surging to the top of the WCHA. UND sandwiched an exhibition game against the eventual gold-medalist US National Team between their series against the Golden Gophers and the Bulldogs, though in the later set the Fighting Sioux could only manage a split.

Over the winter break North Dakota played two non-conference series. Up first Ohio State at home where UND dominated the two games. A couple of weeks later the Fighting Sioux found themselves in Marquette to take on Northern Michigan. While North Dakota was distinguishing itself as the class of the WCHA, NMU possessed an even more impressive record at 14–2 and continued to prove they were no fluke by downing North Dakota in both games.

=== Second half ===
The two losses didn't harm UND that much as they didn't affect the team's top seed in the WCHA. However, just for good measure, the Fighting Sioux swept the next two weekends (both at home) against conference opponents to take a stranglehold of the conference. UND's lead was so large by this point that when they could only earn one win in the next four games it hardly mattered to their conference standing.

After the poor road trip UND played their third national team of the season, finally managing to take town an Olympic squad, albeit the one that would finish dead-last at the 1980 winter games. After the win North Dakota went on a winning streak, beginning at home where they hadn't lost since early November. UND won their final 8 regular season games, including 4 on the road (which had given them trouble all season) to finish with a stellar 25–8–1 record and easily win the WCHA.

=== WCHA tournament ===
With the top seed, North Dakota played host to Michigan State and avenged their early-season loss with a comfortable 8–1 win in the first game. With a 7-goal lead to work with the Fighting Sioux were able to relax in game 2 and win the series 13–4. The second series against Notre Dame was more of the same with UND taking a huge lead after a 10–4 win, eventually capturing the series 17–8. North Dakota won their second consecutive WCHA title and fourth overall and received the top western seed for the NCAA tournament.

=== NCAA tournament ===
UND opened against ECAC Hockey runner-up Dartmouth for the second time in as many years and had a nearly identical performance. After the 4–1 victory UND met the #1 team in the country, Northern Michigan. The teams had two of the top offenses in the nation (only Minnesota scored more goals) and game would see the top four NCAA scorers on the ice at the same time. despite being a freshman Darren Jensen had distinguished himself as the best option in goal for North Dakota and, having learned from his error the previous year, Gasparini started the Creston in goal. Doug Smail would open the scoring just before the mid-point of the first period but shortly thereafter leading scorer and team captain Mark Taylor would be knocked out of the game with an injury. Smail, the leading goal scorer, would take over and score twice more to produce only the second natural hat-trick in championship history. Phil Sykes would in on the scoring in the third period, his fourth point of the night. After the goal the Wildcat offence finally woke up and scored, scoring twice in a span of 51 seconds, but three minutes the game was put away when Smail tied the NCAA record with his fourth goal of the contest, again with a primary assist from Sykes. North Dakota won the championship having outshot NMU 45–22, ending their 16-year championship drought.

=== Awards and honors ===
Doug Smail won the tournament MOP for his nearly single-handed victory in the championship game and was joined on the All-Tournament team by Phil Sykes and Marc Chorney. Mark Taylor finished 4 points back of the scoring title but was named to the AHCA All-American West Team along with Howard Walker. Both Walker and Taylor made the All-WCHA First Team while Smail and Chorney were named to the Second Team.

Darren Jensen would win his first start the following season, extending his undefeated streak to 15 games to start a career; still an NCAA record (as of 2016).

Three players were selected in the 1980 NHL entry draft with all three reaching the NHL.

== Standings ==
1979–80 Western Collegiate Hockey Association standings
	Conference							Overall					
	GP	W	L	T	PTS	GF	GA	GP	W	L	T	GF	GA
North Dakota†*	28	21	6	1	.768	147	89	40	31	8	1	217	119
Minnesota*	32	18	14	0	.563	173	155	41	26	15	0	263	179
Colorado College	30	16	13	1	.550	154	164	39	21	17	1	200	208
Michigan	26	13	11	2	.538	131	118	38	23	13	2	205	167
Notre Dame	28	13	14	1	.482	150	146	39	18	20	1	202	199
Minnesota-Duluth	32	15	17	0	.469	166	181	38	17	21	0	191	207
Michigan Tech	28	12	14	2	.464	141	120	38	18	18	2	181	160
Michigan State	28	12	16	0	.429	118	167	38	14	24	0	158	227
Wisconsin	30	12	18	0	.400	146	146	36	15	20	1	172	182
Denver	26	8	17	1	.327	95	135	36	13	22	1	141	169
Championship: Minnesota, North Dakota † indicates conference regular season champion * indicates conference tournament champion

== Schedule ==
Date	Opponent^{#}	Rank^{#}	Site	Result	Record
Exhibition
October 16	vs. Canadian National Team*		Winter Sports Center • Grand Forks, North Dakota (Exhibition)	L 3–6	
October 19	at Minnesota–Duluth*		Duluth Arena Auditorium • Duluth, Minnesota (Exhibition)	W 7–2	
Regular season
October 26	vs. Colorado College		Winter Sports Center • Grand Forks, North Dakota	L 2–3	0–1 (0–1)
October 27	vs. Colorado College		Winter Sports Center • Grand Forks, North Dakota	W 9–4	1–1 (1–1)
November 2	vs. Michigan Tech		Winter Sports Center • Grand Forks, North Dakota	W 4–3	2–1 (2–1)
November 3	vs. Michigan Tech		Winter Sports Center • Grand Forks, North Dakota	L 3–5	2–2 (2–2)
November 9	at Denver		DU Arena • Denver, Colorado	W 4–3	3–2 (3–2)
November 10	at Denver		DU Arena • Denver, Colorado	W 3–0	4–2 (4–2)
November 16	vs. St. Lawrence*		Winter Sports Center • Grand Forks, North Dakota	W 4–3	5–2 (4–2)
November 17	vs. St. Lawrence*		Winter Sports Center • Grand Forks, North Dakota	W 7–0	6–2 (4–2)
November 23	at Michigan State		Munn Ice Arena • East Lansing, Michigan	W 9–2	7–2 (5–2)
November 24	at Michigan State		Munn Ice Arena • East Lansing, Michigan	L 4–5 ^{OT}	7–3 (5–3)
November 30	vs. Minnesota		Winter Sports Center • Grand Forks, North Dakota	W 6–3	8–3 (6–3)
December 1	vs. Minnesota		Winter Sports Center • Grand Forks, North Dakota	W 7–6 ^{OT}	9–3 (7–3)
December 4	vs. US National Team*		Winter Sports Center • Grand Forks, North Dakota (Exhibition)	L 1–6	9–3 (7–3)
December 7	at Minnesota–Duluth		Duluth Arena Auditorium • Duluth, Minnesota	L 4–5 ^{OT}	9–4 (7–4)
December 8	at Minnesota–Duluth		Duluth Arena Auditorium • Duluth, Minnesota	W 4–3 ^{OT}	10–4 (8–4)
December 21	vs. Ohio State*		Winter Sports Center • Grand Forks, North Dakota	W 7–2	11–4 (8–4)
December 22	vs. Ohio State*		Winter Sports Center • Grand Forks, North Dakota	W 8–2	12–4 (8–4)
January 4	at Northern Michigan*		Lakeview Arena • Marquette, Michigan	L 2–4	12–5 (8–4)
January 5	at Northern Michigan*		Lakeview Arena • Marquette, Michigan	L 3–4 ^{OT}	12–6 (8–4)
January 11	vs. Notre Dame		Winter Sports Center • Grand Forks, North Dakota	W 7–4	13–6 (9–4)
January 12	vs. Notre Dame		Winter Sports Center • Grand Forks, North Dakota	W 3–1	14–6 (10–4)
January 18	vs. Minnesota–Duluth		Winter Sports Center • Grand Forks, North Dakota	W 7–3	15–6 (11–4)
January 19	vs. Minnesota–Duluth		Winter Sports Center • Grand Forks, North Dakota	W 5–1	16–6 (12–4)
January 25	at Colorado College		Broadmoor World Arena • Colorado Springs, Colorado	L 8–9 ^{OT}	16–7 (12–5)
January 26	at Colorado College		Broadmoor World Arena • Colorado Springs, Colorado	W 7–3	17–7 (13–5)
February 1	at Michigan Tech		Student Ice Arena • Houghton, Michigan	T 3–3 ^{OT}	17–7–1 (13–5–1)
February 2	at Michigan Tech		Student Ice Arena • Houghton, Michigan	L 4–6	17–8–1 (13–6–1)
February 6	vs. Japanese National Team*		Winter Sports Center • Grand Forks, North Dakota (Exhibition)	W 7–2	17–8–1 (13–6–1)
February 8	vs. Denver		Winter Sports Center • Grand Forks, North Dakota	W 7–1	18–8–1 (14–6–1)
February 9	vs. Denver		Winter Sports Center • Grand Forks, North Dakota	W 5–2	19–8–1 (15–6–1)
February 15	at Minnesota		Williams Arena • Minneapolis, Minnesota	W 5–3	20–8–1 (16–6–1)
February 16	at Minnesota		Williams Arena • Minneapolis, Minnesota	W 6–2	21–8–1 (17–6–1)
February 22	vs. Michigan		Winter Sports Center • Grand Forks, North Dakota	W 5–2	22–8–1 (18–6–1)
February 23	vs. Michigan		Winter Sports Center • Grand Forks, North Dakota	W 4–3	23–8–1 (19–6–1)
February 29	at Wisconsin		Dane County Coliseum • Madison, Wisconsin	W 8–1	24–8–1 (20–6–1)
March 1	at Wisconsin		Dane County Coliseum • Madison, Wisconsin	W 4–3	25–8–1 (21–6–1)
WCHA tournament
March 7	vs. Michigan State*		Winter Sports Center • Grand Forks, North Dakota (WCHA First Round game 1)	W 8–1	26–8–1 (21–6–1)
March 8	vs. Michigan State*		Winter Sports Center • Grand Forks, North Dakota (WCHA First Round game 2)	W 5–3	27–8–1 (21–6–1)
North Dakota Wins Series 13-4
March 14	vs. Notre Dame*		Winter Sports Center • Grand Forks, North Dakota (WCHA Second Round game 1)	W 10–4	28–8–1 (21–6–1)
March 15	vs. Notre Dame*		Winter Sports Center • Grand Forks, North Dakota (WCHA Second Round game 2)	W 7–4	29–8–1 (21–6–1)
North Dakota Wins Series 17-8
NCAA tournament
March 27	vs. Dartmouth*		Providence Civic Center • Providence, Rhode Island (National Semifinal)	W 4–1	30–8–1 (21–6–1)
March 28	vs. Northern Michigan*		Providence Civic Center • Providence, Rhode Island (National championship)	W 5–2	31–8–1 (21–6–1)
*Non-conference game. ^{#}Rankings from USCHO.com Poll. Source:

== Roster and scoring statistics ==
No.	Name	Year	Position	Hometown	S/P/C	Games	Goals	Assists	Pts	PIM
11	Mark Taylor	Senior	C	Vancouver, BC	(British Columbia)	40	33	59	92	28
8	Doug Smail	Senior	W	Moose Jaw, SK	(Saskatchewan)	40	43	44	87	70
25	Phil Sykes	Sophomore	W	Dawson Creek, BC	(British Columbia)	37	22	27	49	34
19	Rick Zaparniuk	Senior	C	Edmonton, AB	(Alberta)	40	15	31	46	34
16	Marc Chorney	Junior	D	Thunder Bay, ON	(Ontario)	39	7	38	45	54
24	Rick Myers	Senior	W	East Grand Forks, MN	(Minnesota)	33	18	20	38	18
22	Cary Eades	Sophomore	W	Burnaby, BC	(British Columbia)	30	16	12	28	50
4	Brad Cox	Senior	D	Lethbridge, AB	(Alberta)	39	3	25	28	26
3	Howard Walker	Sophomore	D	Grande Prairie, AB	(Alberta)	39	7	18	25	57
18	Dean Dachyshyn	Freshman	W	Devon, AB	(Alberta)	40	12	8	20	88
9	Dusty Carroll	Freshman	C	Charlottetown, PE	(Prince Edward Island)	39	8	11	19	24
10	Glen White	Freshman	F	Rosetown, SK	(Saskatchewan)	40	8	10	18	14
17	Erwin Martens	Senior	W	Cartwright, MB	(Manitoba)	34	7	10	17	28
5	Mickey Volcan	Freshman	D	Edmonton, AB	(Alberta)	33	2	14	16	38
21	Paul Chadwick	Junior	W	Williams Lake, BC	(British Columbia)	40	7	8	15	65
14	Frank Burggraf	Sophomore	C	Roseau, MN	(Minnesota)	34	4	7	11	36
23	Mike Neitzke	Senior	W	Detroit Lakes, MN	(Minnesota)	24	4	6	10	32
2	Craig Ludwig	Freshman	D	Eagle River, WI	(Wisconsin)	33	1	8	9	32
20	Travis Dunn	Sophomore	D	Winnipeg, MB	(Manitoba)	37	0	6	6	32
6	Conway Marvin	Sophomore	D	Warroad, MN	(Minnesota)	20	0	5	5	12
30	Bob Iwabuchi	Sophomore	G	Edmonton, AB	(Alberta)	20	0	1	1	4
15	Troy Magnuson	Freshman	W	Chanhassen, MN	(Minnesota)	6	0	0	0	10
1	Pierre Lamoureux	Freshman	G	Fort Saskatchewan, AB	(Alberta)		0	0	0	0
	Mel Donnelly	Junior	G	Fort Frances, ON	(Ontario)	5	0	0	0	0
1	Darren Jensen	Freshman	G	Creston, BC	(British Columbia)	15	0	0	0	0
Total										

== Goaltending statistics ==
No.	Name	Games	Minutes	Wins	Losses	Ties	Goals against	Saves	Shut outs	SV %	GAA
1	Darren Jensen	15	884	13	0	1	33	396	1	.923	2.24
1	Mel Donnelly	5	–	–	–	–	–	–	1	.897	2.40
	Pierre Lamoureux	–	–	–	–	–	–	–	0	.813	3.00
30	Bob Iwabuchi	20	1157	14	–	–	70	494	0	.876	3.63
Total		40	–	31	8	1	119	–	2	–	–

== 1980 championship game ==
=== (W1) North Dakota vs. (A) Northern Michigan ===
March 29	North Dakota	5 – 2	Northern Michigan	Providence Civic Center

Scoring summary
Period	Team	Goal	Assist(s)	Time	Score
1st	UND	Doug Smail	Sykes and Taylor	9:43	1–0 UND
1st	UND	Doug Smail	Sykes and Dunn	12:48	2–0 UND
2nd	UND	Doug Smail – GW	Sykes	23:12	3–0 UND
3rd	UND	Phil Sykes	unassisted	48:42	4–0 UND
3rd	NMU	Bill Joyce	Waddell and Laidlaw	54:29	4–1 UND
3rd	NMU	Terry Houck	Hanson and Pyle	55:20	4–2 UND
3rd	UND	Doug Smail	Sykes and Burggraf	58:21	5–2 UND

Shots by period
Team	1	2	3	T
Northern Michigan	5	5	12	22
North Dakota	13	20	12	45

Goaltenders
Team	Name	Saves	Goals against	Time on ice
NMU	Steve Weeks	40	5	
UND	Darren Jensen	20	2	

== Players drafted into the NHL ==
=== 1980 NHL entry draft ===
= NHL All-Star team	= NHL All-Star	= NHL All-Star and NHL All-Star team	= Did not play in the NHL

Round	Pick	Player	NHL team
3	50	Mickey Volcan	Hartford Whalers
3	57	Troy Murray†	Chicago Black Hawks
3	61	Craig Ludwig	Montreal Canadiens
5	92	Darren Jensen	Hartford Whalers
9	170	Ed Cristian†	Winnipeg Jets

† incoming freshman

== See also ==
- 1980 NCAA Division I Men's Ice Hockey Tournament
- List of NCAA Division I Men's Ice Hockey Tournament champions
