= Dick Bertrand =

Canadian ice hockey player and coach

Biographical details
- Born: 1941; Connaught, Ontario, Canada
- Education: Cornell

Playing career
- 1967–1970: Cornell
- Position: Wing

Coaching career (HC unless noted)
- 1970–1982: Cornell
- 1982–1986: Ferris State

Head coaching record
- Overall: 286-177-18 (.613)

Accomplishments and honors

Championships
- 1970 NCAA National Champion (player); 1971–72 ECAC Regular Season Champion; 1972–73 ECAC Regular Season Champion; 1973 ECAC Tournament Champion; 1980 ECAC Tournament Champion

Dick Bertrand (born 1941) is a retired college ice hockey player and coach. Bertrand both played and coached at Cornell from 1966 through 1982 before leaving to take over at Ferris State. He remained with the Bulldogs until leaving the team part way through the 1985–86 season, ending his ice hockey career.

== Career ==
Bertrand began his college career as a player for Cornell in 1966, but he was unable to suit up for the Big Red squad that would win the National Championship that season due to the NCAA's regulations forbidding freshmen from participating. Bertrand officially hit the ice the following campaign and was part of a powerhouse Cornell squad that would only lose 4 games over the next three seasons. Despite their massive success, the Big Red were unable to capture a national championship in either of the succeeding two tournaments, finishing 3rd and 2nd respectively. Following the departure of future NHL superstar Ken Dryden, the 1969–70 team accomplished something no other college ice hockey team has ever matched; Cornell won the 1970 title as an undefeated team with a 29-0 record.

After the team's second national title in 4 years, head coach Ned Harkness left to take charge of the Detroit Red Wings. For his replacement, Cornell turned to Dick Bertrand and, since he had yet to graduate when he was named to the position, Bertrand became the first undergraduate to be a head coach in NCAA history (though he was 29 at the time). In his first three seasons as coach Cornell won at least 22 games every year and made the NCAA tournament twice, finishing second in 1972 and fourth the following season. For the remainder of the decade, the Big Red would remain one of the nation's top teams, compiling a winning percentage of no less than .638 in any season, but the team failed to make any further tournament appearances until a surprise berth in 1980. Bertrand remained with the team until 1982, when he resigned after his only losing season in Ithaca to take the top job at Ferris State.

Bertrand arrived in Big Rapids with the Bulldogs on the cusp of making waves in the CCHA. After two consecutive 20-win seasons, the previous year saw the team drop to 15 victories. The first two years under Bertrand saw more of the same with a 16- and 18-win campaigns, but the third year was a disaster as the Bulldogs finished with an 11-26-1 mark and dead last in the conference. While the fourth season brought moderate success, Bertrand resigned after an 11-10-1 start, turning the team over to Peter Esdale and ending his collegiate career.

== Head coaching record ==
Record table
Season	Team	Overall	Conference	Standing	Postseason
Cornell Big Red (ECAC Hockey) (1970–1982)
1970–71	Cornell	22-5-0	17-3-0	3rd	ECAC Third Place Game (Loss)
1971–72	Cornell	23-6-0	17-3-0	1st	NCAA Runner-Up
1972–73	Cornell	23-5-1	14-3-1	11th	NCAA Third Place Game (Loss)
1973–74	Cornell	19-7-1	13-6-1	4th	ECAC Third Place Game (Win)
1974–75	Cornell	17-9-2	15-6-1	4th	ECAC Third Place Game (Loss)
1975–76	Cornell	18-10-1	13-9-1	5th	ECAC Third Place Game (Win)
1976–77	Cornell	20-8-1	16-6-1	3rd	ECAC Third Place Game (Win)
1977–78	Cornell	20-6-1	16-5-1	2nd	ECAC Quarterfinals
1978–79	Cornell	21-8-0	16-6-0	3rd	ECAC Third Place Game (Win)
1979–80	Cornell	16-15-0	11-11-0	t-7th	NCAA Consolation Game (Loss)
1980–81	Cornell	19-11-1	12-9-1	t-6th	NCAA Quarterfinals
1981–82	Cornell	12-13-1	10-11-1	t-10th	
Cornell:		230-103-9	170-78-8		
Ferris State Bulldogs (CCHA) (1982–1986)
1982–83	Ferris State	16-18-4	12-16-4	t-7th	CCHA Quarterfinals
1983–84	Ferris State	18-20-3	13-15-2	t-5th	CCHA Quarterfinals
1984–85	Ferris State	11-26-1	8-23-1	9th	
1985–86	Ferris State	11-10-1†	9-10-1†		
Ferris State:		56-74-9	42-64-8		
Total:		286-177-18			
National champion Postseason invitational champion Conference regular season champion Conference regular season and conference tournament champion Division regular season champion Division regular season and conference tournament champion Conference tournament champion

† Resigned midseason
