= Roy Schultz =

Canadian ice hockey player

- Born: May 17, 1957 (age 69) Rush Lake, Saskatchewan, Canada
- Height: 5 ft 10 in (178 cm)
- Weight: 172 lb (78 kg; 12 st 4 lb)
- Position: Goaltender
- Caught: Left
- Played for: Wisconsin; Binghamton Dusters; Springfield Indians; Saginaw Gears; Salem/Virginia Raiders
- Playing career: 1978–1983

Roy Schultz is a Canadian retired ice hockey goaltender who was an All-American for Wisconsin.

== Career ==
Schultz played several seasons with the Swift Current Broncos of the Saskatchewan Junior Hockey League. He helped the team finish with winning records each season and was retained by the team as an over-age player in 1978. After exhausting his junior eligibility, Schultz was recruited to Wisconsin by Bob Johnson and shared starting duties with Julian Baretta as a freshman. After Baretta's graduation, Schultz took over as the primary goaltender in 1980. Unfortunately, the Badgers weren't very good that season. Wisconsin finished 9th in the WCHA, missing the postseason for the only time under Johnson's tutelage. Schultz, however, was well regarded by the league and named as the conference's top goaltender that season. He was also named as an All-American despite possessing rather poor statistical numbers.

After his sophomore season, Schultz was signed to a professional contract by the Boston Bruins, a fairly rare occurrence at the time, and began playing minor hockey that spring. On December 10, 1980, Schultz was called up to Boston to serve as an emergency backup while normal reserve Jim Craig attended his uncle's funeral. He didn't play in the game and was returned to Springfield afterwards. He bounced around several minor league teams over the succeeding few seasons before retiring in 1983.

== Statistics ==
=== Regular season and playoffs ===
			Regular season									Playoffs
Season	Team	League	GP	W	L	T	MIN	GA	SO	GAA	SV%	GP	W	L	MIN	GA	SO	GAA	SV%
1974–75	Swift Current Broncos	SJHL	—	—	—	—	—	—	—	—	—	—	—	—	—	—	—	—	—
1975–76	Swift Current Broncos	SJHL	—	—	—	—	—	—	—	—	—	—	—	—	—	—	—	—	—
1976–77	Swift Current Broncos	SJHL	—	—	—	—	—	—	—	—	—	—	—	—	—	—	—	—	—
1977–78	Swift Current Broncos	SJHL	—	—	—	—	—	—	—	—	—	—	—	—	—	—	—	—	—
1978–79	Wisconsin	WCHA	21	15	4	0	1111	77	1	4.16	.880	—	—	—	—	—	—	—	—
1979–80	Wisconsin	WCHA	32	14	17	1	1913	139	0	4.36	.881	—	—	—	—	—	—	—	—
1979–80	Binghamton Dusters	AHL	6	1	5	0	359	23	0	3.83	.876	—	—	—	—	—	—	—	—
1980–81	Springfield Indians	AHL	37	12	15	4	2024	153	0	4.54	.855	1	—	—	—	—	—	—	—
1981–82	Saginaw Gears	IHL	9	—	—	—	540	42	0	4.67	—	—	—	—	—	—	—	—	—
1981–82	Salem Raiders	ACHL	19	—	—	—	1060	69	0	3.91	—	—	—	—	—	—	—	—	—
1982–83	Virginia Raiders	ACHL	30	11	14	3	1684	131	0	4.67	.860	—	—	—	—	—	—	—	—
NCAA totals			53	29	21	1	3024	216	1	4.29	.881	—	—	—	—	—	—	—	—
AHL totals			43	13	20	4	2383	176	0	4.43	.858	—	—	—	—	—	—	—	—

== Awards and honors ==
Award	Year
All-WCHA First Team	1979–80
AHCA West All-American	1979–80
