= Brad Cox (ice hockey) =

Canadian ice hockey player

- Born: November 22, 1956 (age 68); Lethbridge, Alberta, CAN
- Height: 5 ft 10 in (178 cm)
- Weight: 180 lb (82 kg; 12 st 12 lb)
- Position: Defenceman
- Played for: North Dakota; Füchse Duisburg
- Playing career: 1980–1981

Bradford Cox is a Canadian former ice hockey player. He won a national championship with North Dakota in 1980.

== Career ==
After playing junior hockey near his home town of Lethbridge, Cox began attending the University of North Dakota in 1976 and immediately became one of the team's top defencemen. Though he was one of the team's top producers, it wasn't until the arrival of John Gasparini in 1978 that the team returned to prominence. Cox helped the team reach the championship game in both 1979 and 1980, winning the championship as a senior. After graduating, Cox spent the following year with Duisburg SC in the top German league before retiring from the game.

== Career statistics ==
=== Regular season and playoffs ===
			Regular Season					Playoffs
Season	Team	League	GP	G	A	Pts	PIM	GP	G	A	Pts	PIM
1976–77	North Dakota	WCHA	38	4	22	26	36	—	—	—	—	—
1977–78	North Dakota	WCHA	38	9	28	37	66	—	—	—	—	—
1978–79	North Dakota	WCHA	41	5	27	32	30	—	—	—	—	—
1979–80	North Dakota	WCHA	39	3	25	28	26	—	—	—	—	—
1980–81	Duisburg SC	Germany	27	0	5	5	50	7	4	0	4	4
NCAA Totals			156	21	102	123	158	—	—	—	—	—
