= Baseotto =

Baseotto is a surname. Notable people with the surname include:

- Antonio Baseotto (1932–2025), Argentine Roman Catholic bishop
- Bruno Baseotto (born 1960), Canadian-born Italian ice hockey player and coach
