= 1980 NCAA Division I men's ice hockey tournament =

- Teams: 5
- Finals site: Providence Civic Center, Providence, Rhode Island
- Champions: North Dakota Fighting Sioux (3rd title)
- Runner-up: Northern Michigan Wildcats (1st title game)
- Semifinalists: Dartmouth Big Green (4th Frozen Four); Cornell Big Red (7th Frozen Four)
- Winning coach: Gino Gasparini (1st title)
- MOP: Doug Smail (North Dakota)

The 1980 NCAA Division I men's ice hockey tournament was the culmination of the 1979–80 NCAA Division I men's ice hockey season, the 33rd such tournament in NCAA history. It was held between March 22 and 29, 1980, and concluded with North Dakota defeating Northern Michigan 5–2. The first-round game was held at the home team venue while all succeeding games were played at the Providence Civic Center in Providence, Rhode Island.

This would be the last time that Dartmouth would qualify for an NCAA tournament unitl 2026.

== Qualifying teams ==
The NCAA gave four teams automatic bids into the tournament. The two ECAC teams that reached the ECAC tournament final received bids as did the two WCHA co-champions. The NCAA also had the ability to add up to 4 additional teams as it saw fit and chose to include the CCHA tournament champion as well.

East							West						
Seed	School	Conference	Record	Berth type	Appearance	Last bid	Seed	School	Conference	Record	Berth type	Appearance	Last bid
1	Cornell	ECAC Hockey	16–13–0	Tournament champion	7th	1973	1	North Dakota	WCHA	29–8–1	Tournament co-champion	8th	1979
2	Dartmouth	ECAC Hockey	18–10–1	Tournament finalist	4th	1979	2	Minnesota	WCHA	26–14–0	Tournament co-champion	9th	1979
							At-Large						
							Seed	School	Conference	Record	Berth type	Appearance	Last bid
							A	Northern Michigan	CCHA	32–5–1	Tournament champion	1st	Never

== Format ==
The four automatic qualifiers were seeded according to pre-tournament finish. The ECAC champion was seeded as the top eastern team while the WCHA co-champion that finished highest in the regular season was given the top western seed. The second eastern seed was slotted to play the top western seed and vice versa. Because an at-large bid was offered to a western school they were placed in a first-round game with the second western seed to determine the final semifinalist. The first-round game was played at the home venue of the second seed while all succeeding games were played at the Providence Civic Center. All matches were Single-game eliminations with the semifinal winners advancing to the national championship game and the losers playing in a consolation game.

== Bracket ==
First Round; March 22
W2	Minnesota	3
A	Northern Michigan	4

Semifinals; March 27–28
E1	Cornell	4
A	Northern Michigan	5
W1	North Dakota	4
E2	Dartmouth	1

National Championship; March 29
A	Northern Michigan	2
W1	North Dakota	5
Third Place Game
E1	Cornell	4
E2	Dartmouth	8

Note: * denotes overtime period(s)

== Results ==
=== First Round ===
March 22, 1980; 7:30 pm	(W2) Minnesota	3–4 (0–2, 2–1, 1–1)	(A) Northern Michigan	Williams Arena; Attendance: 7,606

Game reference

Paul Butters
Goalies
Steve Weeks

	0 – 1	02:42 – Bill Joyce (Mielke, Tascoff)
	0 – 2	10:22 – Steve Bozek (Mielke)
(Larson, Harrer) Aaron Broten – PP – 33:33	1 – 2
(Erickson, Meadows) Steve Griffith – 36:25	2 – 2
	2 – 3	37:26 – PP – Steve Bozek (Joyce, Ikkala)
(Erickson) Keven Hartzell – 41:40	3 – 3
	3 – 4	42:09 – GW – Steve Bozek (unassisted)

8 min
Penalties
10 min
36
Shots
24

=== Semifinals ===
March 27, 1980; 7:30 pm	(W1) North Dakota	4–1 (0–1, 0–0, 4–0)	(E2) Dartmouth	Providence Civic Center; Attendance: 5,119

Game reference

Bob Iwabuchi
Goalies
Bob Gaudet
Referees:
Duane Markus
Steve Darling
Linesman:
Charles Holden

	0 – 1	13:08 – Mark Bedard (Ryan, Flanigan)
(Taylor, Volcan) Phil Sykes – 51:16	1 – 1
(Martens, Chadwick) Dusty Carroll – GW – 52:23	2 – 1
(Myers, Volcan) Rick Zaparniuk – 54:53	3 – 1
(unassisted) Phil Sykes – 56:16	4 – 1

16 min
Penalties
12 min
26
Shots
20

March 28, 1980; 7:30 pm	(E1) Cornell	4–5 (1–1, 2–2, 1–2)	(A) Northern Michigan	Providence Civic Center; Attendance: 5,237

Game reference

Darren Eliot
Goalies
Steve Weeks
Referees:
John Ricci
Charles Holden

(Gallant, Gibson) Brock Tredway – 03:27	1 – 0
	1 – 1	07:53 – Walt Kyle (Pyle)
	1 – 2	22:13 – Tom Laidlaw (unassisted)
	1 – 3	25:58 – Bill Joyce (Bozek)
(Habib, Cole) Greg Reid – 27:17	2 – 3
(Tobin, Geiger) Jeff Baikie – 33:38	3 – 3
	3 – 4	50:52 – Bill Joyce (Mielke, Laidlaw)
	3 – 5	57:43 – GW – Don Waddell (Mielke, Tascoff)
(Roeszler, Gibson) Roy Kerling – EA – 59:55	4 – 5

12 min
Penalties
8 min
27
Shots
35

=== Third Place Game ===
March 29, 1980; 2:00 pm	(E1) Cornell	4–8 (2–1, 0–5, 2–2)	(E2) Dartmouth	Providence Civic Center; Attendance: 3,943

Game reference

Brian Hayward
Goalies
Bob Gaudet
Referees:
Duane Markus
Charles Holden
Linesman:
John Ricci

	0 – 1	06:58 – Tom Cross (unassisted)
(Gibson, Gallant) Roy Kerling – SH – 09:40	1 – 1
(Kerling, Berk) John Olds – PP – 15:33	2 – 1
	2 – 2	21:01 – Joe Jangro (C. Wilson, Bettencourt)
	2 – 3	21:38 – Chip Bettencourt (R. Wilson, C. Wilson)
	2 – 4	25:56 – Barry Ryan (unassisted)
	2 – 5	29:46 – GW – Joe Jangro (unassisted)
	2 – 6	37:36 – Ross Brownridge (Donnelly, Murphy)
	2 – 7	50:09 – Barry Ryan (Murphy, Brownridge)
(Gallant, Kerling) Brock Tredway – PP – 55:56	3 – 7
(Roeszler, Gallant) Roy Kerling – PP – 58:41	4 – 7
	4 – 8	59:36 – Carey Wilson (Bettencourt, Gaudet)

14 min
Penalties
18 min
37
Shots
40

=== National Championship ===
March 29, 1980; 7:30 pm	(W1) North Dakota	5–2 (2–0, 1–0, 2–2)	(A) Northern Michigan	Providence Civic Center; Attendance: 6,056

Game reference
Referees: John Ricci; Steve Darling; Linesman: Duane Markus

Scoring summary
Period	Team	Goal	Assist(s)	Time	Score
1st	UND	Doug Smail – PP	Sykes and Taylor	9:43	1–0 UND
1st	UND	Doug Smail	Sykes and Dunn	12:48	2–0 UND
2nd	UND	Doug Smail – GW	Sykes	23:12	3–0 UND
3rd	UND	Phil Sykes	unassisted	48:42	4–0 UND
3rd	NMU	Bill Joyce	Waddell and Laidlaw	54:29	4–1 UND
3rd	NMU	Terry Houck	Hanson and Pyle	55:20	4–2 UND
3rd	UND	Doug Smail	Sykes and Burggraf	58:21	5–2 UND
Penalty summary
Period	Team	Player	Penalty	Time	PIM
1st	UND	Doug Smail	Holding	0:58	2:00
1st	UND	Brad Cox	Hooking	5:47	2:00
1st	NMU	Mike Mielke	Roughing	8:56	2:00
1st	NMU	Greg Tignanelli	Roughing	11:59	2:00
1st	UND	Dean Dachyshyn	Roughing	11:59	2:00
1st	UND	Paul Chadwick	Slashing	16:49	2:00
1st	NMU	Bill Joyce	Slashing	16:49	2:00
1st	NMU	Bill Joyce	High-sticking	19:16	2:00
2nd	NMU	Keith Hanson	High-sticking	22:45	2:00
2nd	UND	Frank Burggraf	Slashing	22:45	2:00
2nd	UND	Brad Cox	Hooking	24:17	2:00
2nd	NMU	Jeff Tascoff	Elbowing	24:17	2:00
2nd	UND	Rick Myers	Roughing	30:39	2:00
2nd	NMU	Terry Houck	Elbowing	33:15	2:00
2nd	NMU	Mike Mielke	Roughing	35:14	2:00
2nd	UND	Frank Burggraf	Elbowing	35:14	2:00
2nd	UND	Paul Chadwick	Elbowing	38:11	2:00
3rd	UND	Marc Chorney	High-sticking	52:26	2:00

Shots by period
Team	1	2	3	T
Northern Michigan	5	5	12	22
North Dakota	13	20	12	45

Goaltenders
Team	Name	Saves	Goals against	Time on ice
NMU	Steve Weeks	40	5	
UND	Darren Jensen	20	2	

== All-Tournament team ==
- G: Steve Weeks (Northern Michigan)
- D: Marc Chorney (North Dakota)
- D: Tom Laidlaw (Northern Michigan)
- F: Roy Kerling (Cornell)
- F: Doug Smail* (North Dakota)
- F: Phil Sykes (North Dakota)

* Most Outstanding Player(s)
