= 1980 ECAC Hockey men's ice hockey tournament =

Men's hockey tournament

1980 ECAC Men's ice hockey tournament
- Dates: March 11–15, 1980
- Teams: 8
- Finals site: Boston Garden; Boston, Massachusetts
- Champions: Cornell (6th title)
- Winning coach: Dick Bertrand (2nd title)
- MVP: Darren Eliot (Cornell)
- ECAC Men's Ice Hockey Tournaments

The 1980 ECAC Hockey Men's Ice Hockey Tournament was the 19th tournament in league history. It was played between March 11 and March 15, 1980. Quarterfinal games were played at home team campus sites, while the 'final four' games were played at the Boston Garden in Boston, Massachusetts. By reaching the championship game, both Cornell and Dartmouth received invitations to participate in the 1980 NCAA Division I Men's Ice Hockey Tournament.

== Format ==
The tournament featured three rounds of play, all of which were single-elimination. The three teams that were division champions automatically qualified for the tournament while the remaining five seeds were given to the teams with the highest winning percentage. The top four seeds were given out to the three division champions and the top qualifier and assorted based upon winning percentage. The remaining four seeds were assigned to the other qualifiers and assorted based upon winning percentage. In the quarterfinals the first seed and eighth seed, the second seed and seventh seed, the third seed and sixth seed and the fourth seed and fifth seed played against one another. In the semifinals, the highest seed plays the lowest remaining seed while the two remaining teams play with the winners advancing to the championship game and the losers advancing to the third place game.

== Conference standings ==
Note: GP = Games played; W = Wins; L = Losses; T = Ties; Pct. = Winning percentage; GF = Goals for; GA = Goals against

1979–80 ECAC Hockey standings
	Conference							Overall					
	GP	W	L	T	Pct.	GF	GA	GP	W	L	T	GF	GA
East Region
Boston College†	22	18	3	1	.841	124	75	33	25	7	1	184	120
Providence	23	17	6	0	.739	104	82	32	21	11	0	148	123
Maine	22	10	11	1	.477	90	112	32	15	16	1	129	144
New Hampshire	24	9	15	0	.375	97	117	30	12	18	0	120	133
Boston University	22	8	14	0	.364	99	99	28	11	17	0	128	131
Northeastern	21	5	16	0	.238	77	120	27	7	20	0	103	149
West Region
Vermont	23	16	7	0	.696	98	81	35	23	12	0	156	135
Clarkson	21	14	7	0	.667	141	98	34	21	12	1	205	151
Rensselaer	22	14	8	0	.636	114	84	27	16	11	0	133	112
Colgate	21	10	10	1	.500	78	75	31	18	12	1	139	118
St. Lawrence	21	3	18	0	.143	54	113	32	6	26	0	97	178
Ivy Region
Dartmouth	22	15	6	1	.705	132	97	31	19	11	1	151	125
Cornell*	22	11	11	0	.500	109	108	31	16	15	0	150	146
Brown	22	9	11	2	.455	78	81	26	10	14	2	91	113
Princeton	21	9	12	0	.429	81	93	26	11	15	0	96	111
Harvard	21	7	11	3	.405	83	91	26	8	15	3	102	122
Yale	21	5	14	3	.295	96	118	26	7	16	3	112	135
Championship: Cornell † indicates conference regular season champion * indicates conference tournament champion

== Bracket ==
Teams are reseeded after the first round

Quarterfinals; March 11
1	Boston College	1
8	Cornell	5
2	Providence	8
7	Colgate	3
3	Dartmouth	8
6	Rensselaer	0
4	Vermont	3
5	Clarkson	8

Semifinals; March 14
2	Providence	5
8	Cornell	6
3	Dartmouth	6
5	Clarkson	4

Championship; March 15
3	Dartmouth	1
8	Cornell	5
Third Place
2	Providence	6*
5	Clarkson	5

Note: * denotes overtime period(s)

=== Quarterfinals ===
==== (1) Boston College vs. (8) Cornell ====
March 11	Boston College	1 – 5	Cornell	McHugh Forum

==== (2) Providence vs. (7) Colgate ====
March 11	Providence	8 – 3	Colgate	Schneider Arena

==== (3) Dartmouth vs. (6) Rensselaer ====
March 11	Dartmouth	8 – 0	Rensselaer	Thompson Arena

==== (4) Vermont vs. (5) Clarkson ====
March 11	Vermont	3 – 8	Clarkson	Gutterson Fieldhouse

=== Semifinals ===
==== (2) Providence vs. (8) Cornell ====
March 14	Providence	5 – 6	Cornell	Boston Garden

==== (3) Dartmouth vs. (5) Clarkson ====
March 14	Dartmouth	6 – 4	Clarkson	Boston Garden

=== Third Place ===
==== (2) Providence vs. (5) Clarkson ====
March 15	Providence	6 – 5	OT	Clarkson	Boston Garden

=== Championship ===
==== (3) Dartmouth vs. (8) Cornell ====
March 15	Dartmouth	1 – 5	Cornell	Boston Garden

== Tournament awards ==
=== All-Tournament Team ===
None

=== MOP ===
- Darren Eliot (Cornell)
