= 1980 WCHA men's ice hockey tournament =

1980 WCHA Men's ice hockey tournament
- Dates: March 7–15, 1980
- Teams: 8
- Finals site: Williams Arena; Minneapolis, Minnesota; Winter Sports Center; Grand Forks, North Dakota
- Champions: Minnesota† (7th title); North Dakota‡ (4th title)
- Winning coach: Brad Buetow (1st title); John Gasparini (2nd title)
- WCHA Men's Ice Hockey Tournaments

The 1980 WCHA Men's Ice Hockey Tournament was the 21st conference playoff in league history. The tournament was played between March 7 and March 15, 1980. All games were played at home team campus sites, including each of the two regional final series. By winning the regional tournaments, both Minnesota and North Dakota were invited to participate in the 1980 NCAA Division I Men's Ice Hockey Tournament.

Though not official designations, Minnesota is considered as the East Regional Champion† and North Dakota as the West Regional Champion‡.

== Format ==
The top eight teams in the WCHA, according to their final conference standings, were eligible for the tournament and were seeded No. 1 through No. 8. In the first round the first and eighth seeds, the second and seventh seeds, the third and sixth seeds and the fourth and fifth seeds were matched in two-game series where the school that scored the higher number of goals was declared the winner. After the first round the remaining teams were reseeded No. 1 through No. 4 according to their final conference standings and advanced to the second round. In the second round the first and fourth seeds and the second and third seeds competed in an additional two-game, total goal series with the winners of each being declared as co-conference champions.

=== Conference standings ===
Note: GP = Games played; W = Wins; L = Losses; T = Ties; PTS = Points; GF = Goals For; GA = Goals Against

1979–80 Western Collegiate Hockey Association standings
	Conference							Overall					
	GP	W	L	T	PTS	GF	GA	GP	W	L	T	GF	GA
North Dakota†*	28	21	6	1	.768	147	89	40	31	8	1	217	119
Minnesota*	32	18	14	0	.563	173	155	41	26	15	0	263	179
Colorado College	30	16	13	1	.550	154	164	39	21	17	1	200	208
Michigan	26	13	11	2	.538	131	118	38	23	13	2	205	167
Notre Dame	28	13	14	1	.482	150	146	39	18	20	1	202	199
Minnesota-Duluth	32	15	17	0	.469	166	181	38	17	21	0	191	207
Michigan Tech	28	12	14	2	.464	141	120	38	18	18	2	181	160
Michigan State	28	12	16	0	.429	118	167	38	14	24	0	158	227
Wisconsin	30	12	18	0	.400	146	146	36	15	20	1	172	182
Denver	26	8	17	1	.327	95	135	36	13	22	1	141	169
Championship: Minnesota, North Dakota † indicates conference regular season champion * indicates conference tournament champion

== Bracket ==
Teams are reseeded after the first round

First Round; March 7–8
1	North Dakota	8	5
8	Michigan State	1	3
2	Minnesota	7	6
7	Michigan Tech	2	3
3	Colorado College	4	7
6	Minnesota-Duluth	3	6
4	Michigan	3	4
5	Notre Dame	8	3

Second Round; March 14–15
1	North Dakota	10	7
5	Notre Dame	4	4
2	Minnesota	5	8
3	Colorado College	3	1

Note: * denotes overtime period(s)

=== First round ===
==== (1) North Dakota vs. (8) Michigan State ====
March 7	North Dakota	8 – 1	Michigan State	Winter Sports Center

March 8	North Dakota	5 – 3	Michigan State	Winter Sports Center

North Dakota won series 13–4

==== (2) Minnesota vs. (7) Michigan Tech ====
March 7	Minnesota	7 – 2	Michigan Tech	Williams Arena

March 8	Minnesota	6 – 3	Michigan Tech	Williams Arena

Minnesota won series 13–5

==== (3) Colorado College vs. (6) Minnesota-Duluth ====
March 7	Colorado College	4 – 3	Minnesota-Duluth	Broadmoor World Arena

March 8	Colorado College	7 – 6	Minnesota-Duluth	Broadmoor World Arena

Colorado College won series 11–9

==== (4) Michigan vs. (5) Notre Dame ====
March 7	Michigan	3 – 8	Notre Dame	Yost Ice Arena

March 8	Michigan	4 – 3	Notre Dame	Yost Ice Arena

Notre Dame won series 11–7

=== Second round ===
==== (1) North Dakota vs. (5) Notre Dame ====
March 14	North Dakota	10 – 4	Notre Dame	Winter Sports Center

March 15	North Dakota	7 – 4	Notre Dame	Winter Sports Center

North Dakota won series 17–8

==== (2) Minnesota vs. (3) Colorado College ====
March 14	Minnesota	5 – 3	Colorado College	Williams Arena

March 15	Minnesota	8 – 1	Colorado College	Williams Arena

Minnesota won series 13–4

== Tournament awards ==
None

== See also ==
- Western Collegiate Hockey Association men's champions
