= Peter Esdale =

Canadian ice hockey coach

Biographical details
- Born: Edmonton, Alberta, Canada
- Education: Ohio State University

Coaching career (HC unless noted)
- 1970–1972: Western Michigan (Asst.)
- 1972–1974: American International
- 1976–1977: Mount Royal College
- 1977–1980: Alberta (Asst.)
- 1980–1984: Dalhousie
- 1984–1986: Ferris State (Asst.)
- 1986: Ferris State
- 1986–1987: Spokane Chiefs
- 1988–1991: Alberta (Asst.)
- 1993–1994: Tampa Bay Tritons
- 1994–1995: Alberta
- 1998: Tupelo T-Rex

Head coaching record
- Overall: 24-41-4 (.377) (NCAA)

Peter Esdale is a retired ice hockey head coach who had been in charge at both American International and Ferris State.

== Career ==
Esdale was raised in Edmonton and attended Ohio State University on a hockey scholarship. He began his coaching career as an assistant at Western Michigan and became the head coach at American International two years later. He also coached AIC's soccer and tennis teams. In 1974, he returned to Canada as athletic director at Notre Dame University College. During this time he also played for the Nelson Maple Leafs. In 1976, he became the athletic director and men's hockey coach at Mount Royal College. In 1977, he took a teaching and coaching position at the University of Alberta, where he won two national titles as an assistant hockey coach and one as head soccer coach. In 1980, he became the head hockey coach at Dalhousie Tigers.

In 1984, Esdale moved to Ferris State as an assistant to Dick Bertrand. After Bertrand resigned mid-way through the 1985–86 season, Esdale was named as the interim head coach and finished out the season with a losing but respectable record. After the season, despite a vote of confidence from the AD, Esdale was not retained by the Bulldogs and instead was named as head coach for the Spokane Chiefs. A year later Esdale announced his retirement from coaching to become a sales rep for Procter & Gamble.

Esdale returned to coaching after a one year absence as an assistant at the University of Alberta. During the 1993–94 season, he was co-coach of the Tampa Bay Tritons of Roller Hockey International. He then spent one season as interim head coach at the University of Alberta while Billy Moores was on a leave of absence to coach in Japan. Moores did not return after his year away, but Esdale chose not to stay on as coach due to his commitments as manager of a racquet club. He was the inaugural coach of the Tupelo T-Rex, but was replaced after a 1–11 start.

== Head coaching record ==
Record table
Season	Team	Overall	Conference	Standing	Postseason
American International Yellow Jackets (ECAC 2) (1972–1974)
1972–73	American International	9-18-1			
1973–74	American International	9-14-2			
American International:		18-32-3			
Ferris State Bulldogs (CCHA) (1985–1986)
1985–86	Ferris State	6-9-1†	4-9-1†	6th	CCHA Quarterfinals
Ferris State:		6-9-1	4-9-1		
Total:		24-41-4			
National champion Postseason invitational champion Conference regular season champion Conference regular season and conference tournament champion Division regular season champion Division regular season and conference tournament champion Conference tournament champion

† Midseason replacement
