= Bill Army =

American ice hockey player

- Born: September 11, 1957 (age 69) East Providence, Rhode Island, US
- Height: 6 ft 0 in (183 cm)
- Weight: 185 lb (84 kg; 13 st 3 lb)
- Position: Center
- Played for: Boston College; Rochester Americans; Port Huron Flags; Flint Generals
- Playing career: 1976–1982

William Army is an American retired ice hockey center who was an All-American for Boston College.

== Career ==
Army began attending Boston College in the fall of 1976 after having been recruited for the ice hockey team by Len Ceglarski. After a pedestrian freshman season, Army more than doubled his point production as a sophomore and finished second on the team with 60 points. He helped lead the team to a surprising conference championship and their first NCAA title game in thirteen years. While the Eagles were unsuccessful in their championship bid, Army had firmly established himself as a star for BC. In 1979 he was invited to try out for the national team in the run up to the 1980 Winter Olympics, along with teammate Joe Mullen (neither were ultimately selected). His scoring declined sharply after 1978 but he remained a major part of the Boston College offense and led the team in scoring as a senior. He was named as an All-American despite finishing more than 50 points behind the nation's leader.

After graduating, Army embarked on a short professional career before retiring after the 1982 season. He was inducted into the Boston College Athletic Hall of Fame in 1986. Bill was enshrined in the RI Hockey Hall of Fame in 2025, joining his grandfather, George, and younger brother, Tim, as inductees, and his father, Tom, recipient of the Malcolm Greene Chace Memorial Trophy for "Lifetime Achievement of a Rhode Islander to the Game of Hockey".

== Personal life ==
Bill's younger brother Tim played college hockey at Providence and went on to a long coaching career including stops in the college- and NHL-levels.

== Statistics ==
=== Regular season and playoffs ===
			Regular Season					Playoffs
Season	Team	League	GP	G	A	Pts	PIM	GP	G	A	Pts	PIM
1976–77	Boston College	ECAC Hockey	29	12	14	26	60	—	—	—	—	—
1977–78	Boston College	ECAC Hockey	34	22	38	60	36	—	—	—	—	—
1978–79	Boston College	ECAC Hockey	26	10	24	34	11	—	—	—	—	—
1979–80	Boston College	ECAC Hockey	32	20	24	44	19	—	—	—	—	—
1980–81	Rochester Americans	AHL	19	4	7	11	21	—	—	—	—	—
1980–81	Port Huron Flags	IHL	42	11	18	29	10	—	—	—	—	—
1981–82	Flint Generals	IHL	12	7	6	13	2	—	—	—	—	—
NCAA totals			121	64	100	164	126	—	—	—	—	—

== Awards and honors ==
Award	Year
All-ECAC Hockey Second Team	1979–80
AHCA East All-American	1979–80
