= 1979–80 NCAA Division I men's ice hockey season =

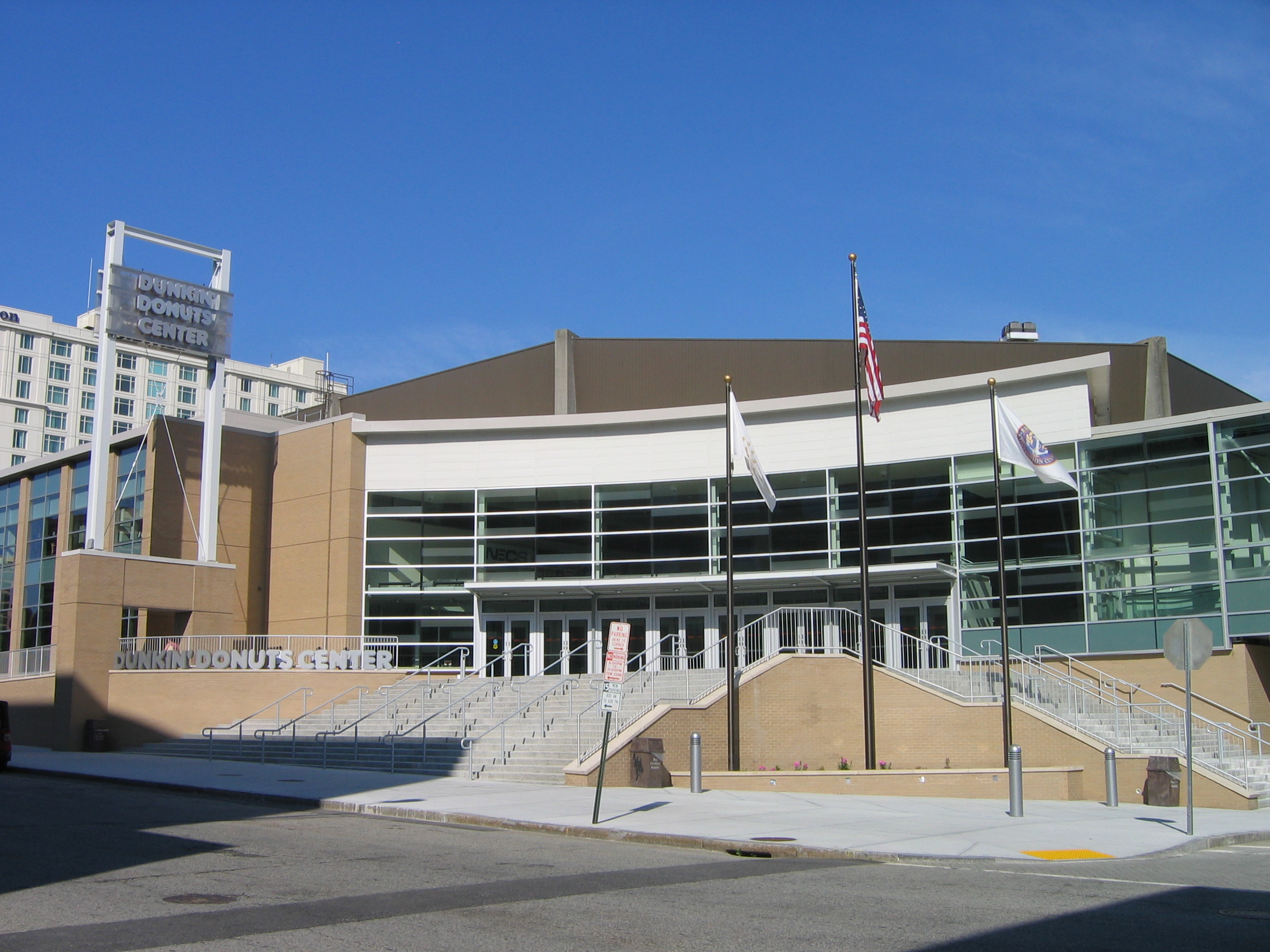
- The Providence Civic Center served as the host for the 1980 Frozen Four
- Duration: October 1979– March 29, 1980
- NCAA tournament: 1980
- National championship: Providence Civic Center; Providence, Rhode Island
- NCAA champion: North Dakota

The 1979–80 NCAA Division I men's ice hockey season began in October 1979 and concluded with the 1980 NCAA Division I Men's Ice Hockey Tournament's championship game on March 29, 1980 at the Providence Civic Center in Providence, Rhode Island. This was the 33rd season in which an NCAA ice hockey championship was held and is the 86th year overall where an NCAA school fielded a team.

== Season Outlook ==
=== Pre-season poll ===
The top teams in the nation voted on by coaches before the start of the season. The poll was compiled by radio station WMPL.

WMPL Poll
Rank	Team
1	Minnesota
2	Denver
3	North Dakota
4	Cornell
5	Wisconsin
6	Michigan
7	Michigan Tech
8	Ohio State
9	Boston University
10 (tie)	Bowling Green
10 (tie)	New Hampshire

== Regular season ==
=== Season tournaments ===
Tournament	Dates	Teams	Champion
Elmira Invitational	November 9–10	4	St. Lawrence
North Country Thanksgiving Festival	November 22–24	4	Clarkson
Old Colony Invitational	December 27–29	4	Providence
Great Lakes Invitational	December 28–29	4	Michigan Tech
New Hampshire Tournament	December 28–29	4	Boston College
Rensselaer Holiday Tournament	December 28–30	4	Western Michigan
Auld Lang Syne Classic	December 30–31	4	Vermont
Colonial Bank Hockey Invitational	January 4–5	4	Boston University
Beanpot	February 4, 11	4	Northeastern

=== Standings ===
1979–80 Big Ten standings
	Conference							Overall					
	GP	W	L	T	Pct.	GF	GA	GP	W	L	T	GF	GA
Minnesota†	12	8	4	0	.667	72	55	41	26	15	0	263	179
Michigan	12	7	5	0	.583	55	46	38	23	13	2	205	167
Michigan State	12	5	7	0	.417	51	76	38	14	24	0	158	227
Wisconsin	12	4	8	0	.333	59	60	36	15	20	1	172	182
† indicates conference regular season champion

1979–80 Central Collegiate Hockey Association standings
	Conference							Overall					
	GP	W	L	T	PTS	GF	GA	GP	W	L	T	GF	GA
Northern Michigan†*	20	17	3	0	34	113	63	41	34	6	1	239	128
Ohio State	20	14	5	1	29	111	70	38	25	10	3	192	123
Ferris State	20	11	9	0	22	108	94	38	26	11	1	214	156
Bowling Green	20	9	11	0	18	87	90	38	16	20	2	161	174
Western Michigan	20	6	13	1	13	95	119	36	18	16	2	196	182
Lake Superior State	20	2	18	0	4	63	140	34	12	21	1	158	201
Championship: Northern Michigan † indicates conference regular season champion * indicates conference tournament champion

1979–80 ECAC Hockey standings
	Conference							Overall					
	GP	W	L	T	Pct.	GF	GA	GP	W	L	T	GF	GA
East Region
Boston College†	22	18	3	1	.841	124	75	33	25	7	1	184	120
Providence	23	17	6	0	.739	104	82	32	21	11	0	148	123
Maine	22	10	11	1	.477	90	112	32	15	16	1	129	144
New Hampshire	24	9	15	0	.375	97	117	30	12	18	0	120	133
Boston University	22	8	14	0	.364	99	99	28	11	17	0	128	131
Northeastern	21	5	16	0	.238	77	120	27	7	20	0	103	149
West Region
Vermont	23	16	7	0	.696	98	81	35	23	12	0	156	135
Clarkson	21	14	7	0	.667	141	98	34	21	12	1	205	151
Rensselaer	22	14	8	0	.636	114	84	27	16	11	0	133	112
Colgate	21	10	10	1	.500	78	75	31	18	12	1	139	118
St. Lawrence	21	3	18	0	.143	54	113	32	6	26	0	97	178
Ivy Region
Dartmouth	22	15	6	1	.705	132	97	31	19	11	1	151	125
Cornell*	22	11	11	0	.500	109	108	31	16	15	0	150	146
Brown	22	9	11	2	.455	78	81	26	10	14	2	91	113
Princeton	21	9	12	0	.429	81	93	26	11	15	0	96	111
Harvard	21	7	11	3	.405	83	91	26	8	15	3	102	122
Yale	21	5	14	3	.295	96	118	26	7	16	3	112	135
Championship: Cornell † indicates conference regular season champion * indicates conference tournament champion

1979–80 NCAA Division I Independent ice hockey standings
	Conference							Overall					
	GP	W	L	T	PTS	GF	GA	GP	W	L	T	GF	GA
Air Force	0	0	0	0	-	-	-	31	15	16	0	150	167
Miami	0	0	0	0	-	-	-	38	22	13	3	210	140
US International	0	0	0	0	-	-	-	34	24	8	2		

1979–80 Western Collegiate Hockey Association standings
	Conference							Overall					
	GP	W	L	T	PTS	GF	GA	GP	W	L	T	GF	GA
North Dakota†*	28	21	6	1	.768	147	89	40	31	8	1	217	119
Minnesota*	32	18	14	0	.563	173	155	41	26	15	0	263	179
Colorado College	30	16	13	1	.550	154	164	39	21	17	1	200	208
Michigan	26	13	11	2	.538	131	118	38	23	13	2	205	167
Notre Dame	28	13	14	1	.482	150	146	39	18	20	1	202	199
Minnesota-Duluth	32	15	17	0	.469	166	181	38	17	21	0	191	207
Michigan Tech	28	12	14	2	.464	141	120	38	18	18	2	181	160
Michigan State	28	12	16	0	.429	118	167	38	14	24	0	158	227
Wisconsin	30	12	18	0	.400	146	146	36	15	20	1	172	182
Denver	26	8	17	1	.327	95	135	36	13	22	1	141	169
Championship: Minnesota, North Dakota † indicates conference regular season champion * indicates conference tournament champion

=== Final regular season polls ===
The final top 10 teams as ranked by coaches (WMPL) before the conference tournament finals.

WMPL Coaches Poll
Ranking	Team
1	North Dakota
2	Northern Michigan
3	Boston College
4	Minnesota
5	Providence
6	Michigan
7	Dartmouth
8	Ohio State
9	Colorado College
10	Vermont

== 1980 NCAA Tournament ==
First round March 22
W2	Minnesota	3
A	Northern Michigan	4

Semifinals; March 27–28
E1	Cornell	4
A	Northern Michigan	5
W1	North Dakota	4
E2	Dartmouth	1

National championship March 29
A	Northern Michigan	2
W1	North Dakota	5
Third-place game
E1	Cornell	4
E2	Dartmouth	8

Note: * denotes overtime period(s)

== Player stats ==
=== Scoring leaders ===
The following players led the league in points at the conclusion of the season.

GP = Games played; G = Goals; A = Assists; Pts = Points; PIM = Penalty minutes

Player	Class	Team	GP	G	A	Pts	PIM
Bill Joyce	Senior	Northern Michigan	40	41	55	96	40
Mark Taylor	Senior	North Dakota	40	33	59	92	28
Steve Bozek	Sophomore	Northern Michigan	41	42	47	89	32
Doug Smail	Junior	North Dakota	40	43	44	87	70
Murray Eaves	Sophomore	Michigan	33	36	49	85	34
Tim Harrer	Senior	Minnesota	41	53	29	82	50
Dan Lerg	Senior	Michigan	38	37	39	76	28
Bruno Baseotto	Freshman	Michigan	38	31	45	76	16
Aaron Broten	Freshman	Minnesota	41	25	47	72	8
Greg Meredith	Senior	Notre Dame	40	40	31	71	14

=== Leading goaltenders ===
The following goaltenders led the league in goals against average at the end of the regular season while playing at least 33% of their team's total minutes.

GP = Games played; Min = Minutes played; W = Wins; L = Losses; OT = Overtime/shootout losses; GA = Goals against; SO = Shutouts; SV% = Save percentage; GAA = Goals against average

Player	Class	Team	GP	Min	W	L	OT	GA	SO	SV%	GAA
Darren Jensen	Freshman	North Dakota	15	890	13	0	1	33	1	.923	2.24
Steve Weeks	Senior	Northern Michigan	36	2133	29	6	1	105	1	.910	2.95
Steve Jones	Senior	Ohio State	24	-	15	-	-	-	-	-	3.27
Dan Kodatsky	Sophomore	Miami	-	1269	-	-	-	70	0	.899	3.31
Sylvain Turcotte	Junior	Vermont	25	1492	17	8	0	87	-	.883	3.50
Scott Fiske	Sophomore	Providence	22	1265	15	6	0	75	0	.886	3.56
Bob Iwabuchi	Sophomore	North Dakota	20	1157	14	-	-	70	0	.876	3.63
Peter Mielzynski	Sophomore	Clarkson	12	610	-	-	-	37	0	.873	3.64
Mark Holden	Senior	Brown	26	1508	10	14	2	93	0	.895	3.70
Rob Polman-Tuin	Freshman	Michigan Tech	13	-	-	-	-	-	-	.894	3.72
Mike Blake	Junior	Ohio State	15	775	8	4	1	48	0	-	3.72

== Awards ==
=== NCAA ===
Award		Recipient
Spencer Penrose Award		Rick Comley, Northern Michigan
Most Outstanding Player in NCAA Tournament		Doug Smail, North Dakota
AHCA All-American Teams
East Team	Position	West Team
Mark Holden, Brown	G	Roy Schultz, Wisconsin
André Aubut, Maine	D	Dave Feamster, Colorado College
Louis Cote, Vermont	D	Howard Walker, North Dakota
	D	Theran Welsh, Wisconsin
Bill Army, Boston College	F	Murray Eaves, Michigan
Ross Brownridge, Dartmouth	F	Tim Harrer, Minnesota
Craig Homola, Vermont	F	Greg Meredith, Notre Dame
	F	Mark Taylor, North Dakota

=== CCHA ===
Award		Recipient
Player of the Year		Steve Weeks, Northern Michigan
Rookie of the Year		Steve Mulholland, Lake Superior State
Coach of the Year		Rick Comley, Northern Michigan
All-CCHA Teams
First Team	Position	Second Team
Steve Weeks, Northern Michigan	G	Steve Jones, Ohio State
Tom Laidlaw, Northern Michigan	D	John Gibb, Bowling Green
Don Waddell, Northern Michigan	D	Mike Cotter, Bowling Green
	D	Brian Jenks, Ohio State
	D	Greg Kostenko, Ohio State
	D	Rod McNair, Ohio State
	D	Paul Pickard, Ferris State
Steve Bozek, Northern Michigan	F	Larry Marson, Ohio State
Bill Joyce, Northern Michigan	F	Paul Tilley, Ohio State
Jim Baker, Ferris State	F	Steve Mulholland, Lake Superior State
	F	Bob Scurfield, Western Michigan

=== ECAC ===
Award		Recipient
Player of the Year		Craig Homola, Vermont
Rookie of the Year		Mark Fusco, Harvard
Most Outstanding Player in Tournament		Darren Eliot, Cornell
All-ECAC Hockey Teams
First Team	Position	Second Team
Doug Ellis, Boston College	G	Sylvain Turcotte, Vermont
Louis Cote, Vermont	D	Ed Small, Clarkson
Andre Aubut, Maine	D	Scott Kleinendorst, Providence
Craig Homola, Vermont	F	Bill Army, Boston College
Ross Brownridge, Dartmouth	F	Steve Cruickshank, Clarkson
Mike Prestidge, Clarkson	F	Billy O'Dwyer, Boston College
	F	Steve O'Neill, Providence

=== WCHA ===
Award		Recipient
Most Valuable Player		Tim Harrer, Minnesota
Freshman of the Year		Aaron Broten, Minnesota
Coach of the Year		Brad Buetow, Minnesota
All-WCHA Teams
First Team	Position	Second Team
Roy Schultz, Wisconsin	G	Tom Frame, Colorado College
Dave Feamster, Colorado College	D	Theran Welsh, Wisconsin
Howard Walker, North Dakota	D	Marc Chorney, North Dakota
Tim Harrer, Minnesota	F	Doug Smail, North Dakota
Mark Taylor, North Dakota	F	Murray Eaves, Michigan
Greg Meredith, Notre Dame	F	Dan Lempe, Minnesota-Duluth

== 1980 NHL entry draft ==
Round	Pick	Player	College	Conference	NHL team
1	11	Mike Blaisdell ^{‡}	Wisconsin	WCHA	Detroit Red Wings
3	44	Murray Eaves	Michigan	WCHA	Winnipeg Jets
3	45	John Newberry ^{†}	Wisconsin	WCHA	Montreal Canadiens
3	47	Dan Miele	Providence	ECAC Hockey	Washington Capitals
3	50	Mickey Volcan	North Dakota	WCHA	Hartford Whalers
3	52	Steve Bozek	Northern Michigan	CCHA	Los Angeles Kings
3	53	Randy Velischek	Providence	ECAC Hockey	Minnesota North Stars
3	57	Troy Murray ^{†}	North Dakota	WCHA	Chicago Black Hawks
3	61	Craig Ludwig	North Dakota	WCHA	Montreal Canadiens
3	62	Jay North ^{†}	Harvard	ECAC Hockey	Buffalo Sabres
4	66	Jay Miller	New Hampshire	ECAC Hockey	Quebec Nordiques
4	67	Carey Wilson	Dartmouth	ECAC Hockey	Chicago Black Hawks
4	75	Bob Brooke	Yale	ECAC Hockey	St. Louis Blues
4	77	Kurt Kleinendorst	Providence	ECAC Hockey	New York Rangers
4	79	Mark Huglen	Minnesota	WCHA	Minnesota North Stars
4	82	Jeff Teal	Minnesota	WCHA	Montreal Canadiens
5	92	Darren Jensen	North Dakota	WCHA	Hartford Whalers
5	98	Scot Kleinendorst	Providence	ECAC Hockey	New York Rangers
5	100	David Jensen	Minnesota	WCHA	Minnesota North Stars
5	101	Ken Leiter	Michigan State	WCHA	New York Islanders
6	106	Aaron Broten	Minnesota	WCHA	Colorado Rockies
6	112	Ken Berry	Denver	WCHA	Vancouver Canucks
6	115	Darren Eliot	Cornell	ECAC Hockey	Los Angeles Kings
6	116	Ron Dennis	Princeton	ECAC Hockey	Toronto Maple Leafs
6	123	Steve Lyons ^{†}	New Hampshire	ECAC Hockey	Boston Bruins
6	124	Mike McPhee	Rensselaer	ECAC Hockey	Montreal Canadiens
7	128	Brian Mullen ^{†}	Wisconsin	WCHA	Washington Capitals
7	133	Doug Lidster	Colorado College	WCHA	Vancouver Canucks
7	135	Mike Lauen	Michigan Tech	WCHA	Winnipeg Jets
7	136	Mike O'Connor	Michigan Tech	WCHA	Los Angeles Kings
7	140	Bob Scurfield	Western Michigan	CCHA	New York Rangers
7	142	Bill Stewart	Denver	WCHA	Minnesota North Stars
7	143	Mark Hamway	Michigan State	WCHA	New York Islanders
7	145	Bill Norton	Clarkson	ECAC Hockey	Montreal Canadiens
7	147	Ross Fitzpatrick	Western Michigan	CCHA	Philadelphia Flyers
8	149	Sandy Beadle	Northeastern	ECAC Hockey	Winnipeg Jets
8	152	Bruce Raboin	Providence	ECAC Hockey	Washington Capitals
8	153	Rob Polman-Tuin	Michigan Tech	WCHA	Edmonton Oilers
8	154	John O'Connor	Vermont	ECAC Hockey	Vancouver Canucks
8	155	Brent DeNat	Michigan Tech	WCHA	Hartford Whalers
8	157	Billy O'Dwyer	Boston College	ECAC Hockey	Los Angeles Kings
8	164	Morey Gare ^{†}	Northern Michigan	CCHA	New York Islanders
9	170	Ed Christian ^{†}	North Dakota	WCHA	Winnipeg Jets
9	176	Paul Fricker	Michigan	WCHA	Hartford Whalers
9	177	Brian Lundberg	Michigan	WCHA	Pittsburgh Penguins
9	180	Peter Lindgren ^{†}	Colorado College	WCHA	St. Louis Blues
9	182	Chris Wray	Boston College	ECAC Hockey	New York Rangers
9	184	Bob Lakso ^{†}	Minnesota–Duluth	WCHA	Minnesota North Stars
9	187	John Schmidt	Notre Dame	WCHA	Montreal Canadiens
10	198	Steve McKenzie ^{†}	Wisconsin	WCHA	Los Angeles Kings
10	199	Kim Collins	Bowling Green	CCHA	Los Angeles Kings
10	205	Dave Richter	Michigan	WCHA	Minnesota North Stars
10	206	Glenn Johannesen ^{†}	Western Michigan	CCHA	New York Islanders
10	208	Scott Robinson	Denver	WCHA	Montreal Canadiens
10	210	Andy Brickley	New Hampshire	ECAC Hockey	Philadelphia Flyers

† incoming freshman
‡ Blaisdell had already left school during the season.

== See also ==
- 1979–80 NCAA Division II men's ice hockey season
- 1979–80 NCAA Division III men's ice hockey season
