= Doug Smail =

Canadian ice hockey player

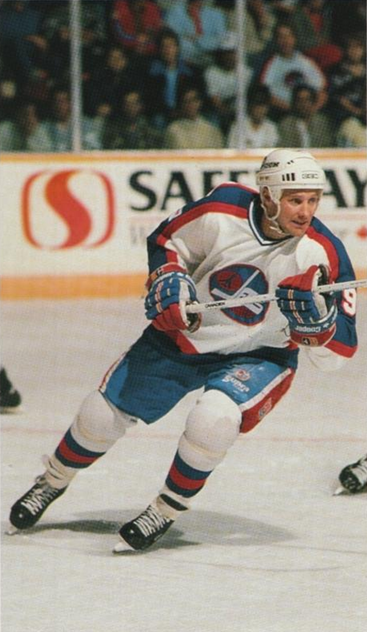
- Born: September 2, 1957 (age 69) Moose Jaw, Saskatchewan, Canada
- Height: 5 ft 9 in (175 cm)
- Weight: 175 lb (79 kg; 12 st 7 lb)
- Position: Left wing
- Shot: Left
- Played for: Winnipeg Jets; Minnesota North Stars; Quebec Nordiques; Ottawa Senators; Fife Flyers; Cardiff Devils
- Playing career: 1980–1996

Douglas Dean Smail (born 2 September 1957) is a Canadian former professional ice hockey left winger who played in the National Hockey League (NHL) for 13 seasons from 1980 through 1993.

== Playing career ==
Smail starred at the University of North Dakota for three seasons from 1977 to 1980, scoring 87 points in 40 games in his final season in the WCHA. His performance was enough to warrant notice from the Winnipeg Jets, and the next season he was a full-time NHL player.

Smail played eleven seasons with Winnipeg, being a top two-way player for them, as he had twelve consecutive seasons in which he scored at least one shorthanded goal, with a total of 28 shorthanded goals in his career.

Perhaps Smail's greatest claim to fame was when he tied the NHL record for fastest goal after the opening faceoff by scoring a goal five seconds after the game started on 20 December 1981. Smail finished his career with the Minnesota North Stars, Quebec Nordiques and Ottawa Senators, but never achieved the success he had in Winnipeg.

After Smail's NHL career was over, he played three seasons in Britain for the Fife Flyers and Cardiff Devils before retiring. He was the first player ever to sign for a British team directly from an NHL team when he signed with Fife from the Senators.

== Post-playing career ==
Smail was one of five plaintiffs along with Dave Forbes, Rick Middleton, Brad Park and Ulf Nilsson in Forbes v. Eagleson, a class action lawsuit filed in 1995 on behalf of about 1,000 NHL players who were employed by NHL teams between 1972 and 1991 against Alan Eagleson, the league and its member clubs. The players alleged that the NHL and its teams violated the Racketeer Influenced and Corrupt Organizations (RICO) Act by colluding with Eagleson to enable him to embezzle from the National Hockey League Players' Association (NHLPA) and that the four-year statute of limitations in civil racketeering cases began when Eagleson was indicted in 1994. The lawsuit was dismissed on August 27, 1998 in United States District Court for the Eastern District of Pennsylvania by Thomas Newman O'Neill Jr. who ruled that the statute of limitations expired because it had begun in 1991 when the players were made aware of the allegations against Eagleson. O'Neill's decision was upheld in the United States Court of Appeals for the Third Circuit on October 17, 2000.

He now resides in Colorado with his wife and four children. Smail was the assistant coach of the U-16 Team Rocky Mountain AAA Hockey program, where he coached alongside former NHL player Rick Berry, and is now the head coach of the Rocky Mountain Roughriders U-18 AAA squad.

== Personal life ==
Smail is a Christian, having been so since his playing days. His relationship with his faith helped inspire teammate Jim Nill to become a Christian.

== Awards and honors ==
Award	Year
All-WCHA Second team	1979–80
All-NCAA All-Tournament Team	1980

- Named to the NCAA Championship Tournament MVP (1980)
- Played in NHL All-Star Game (1990)
- British Ice Hockey Writers Association Player of the Year (1994)

== Records ==
- Winnipeg Jets franchise record for career shorthanded goals (25)
- Fastest goal to start an NHL hockey game (5 seconds) - shared with Merlyn Phillips, Bryan Trottier and Alexander Mogilny

== Career statistics ==
=== Regular season and playoffs ===
			Regular season					Playoffs
Season	Team	League	GP	G	A	Pts	PIM	GP	G	A	Pts	PIM
1977–78	North Dakota Fighting Sioux	WCHA	38	22	28	50	52	—	—	—	—	—
1978–79	North Dakota Fighting Sioux	WCHA	35	24	34	58	46	—	—	—	—	—
1979–80	North Dakota Fighting Sioux	WCHA	40	43	44	87	70	—	—	—	—	—
1980–81	Winnipeg Jets	NHL	30	10	8	18	45	—	—	—	—	—
1981–82	Winnipeg Jets	NHL	72	17	18	35	55	4	0	0	0	0
1982–83	Winnipeg Jets	NHL	80	15	29	44	32	3	0	0	0	6
1983–84	Winnipeg Jets	NHL	66	20	17	37	62	3	0	1	1	7
1984–85	Winnipeg Jets	NHL	80	31	35	66	45	8	2	1	3	4
1985–86	Winnipeg Jets	NHL	73	16	26	42	32	3	1	0	1	0
1986–87	Winnipeg Jets	NHL	78	25	18	36	10	4	0	4	10
1987–88	Winnipeg Jets	NHL	71	15	16	31	34	5	1	0	1	22
1988–89	Winnipeg Jets	NHL	47	14	15	29	52	—	—	—	—	—
1989–90	Winnipeg Jets	NHL	79	25	24	49	63	5	1	0	1	0
1990–91	Winnipeg Jets	NHL	15	1	2	3	10	—	—	—	—	—
1990–91	Minnesota North Stars	NHL	57	7	13	20	38	0	0	0	0
1991–92	Quebec Nordiques	NHL	46	10	18	28	47	—	—	—	—	—
1992–93	Ottawa Senators	NHL	51	4	10	14	51	—	—	—	—	—
1992–93	San Diego Gulls	IHL	9	2	1	3	20	9	3	2	5	20
1993–94	Fife Flyers	BHL	53	74	65	139	114	—	—	—	—	—
1994–95	Cardiff Devils	BHL	3	2	5	7	2	—	—	—	—	—
1994–95	Fife Flyers	BHL	15	20	9	29	26	6	5	9	14	12
1995–96	Cardiff Devils	BHL	16	12	14	26	14	6	3	5	8	10
NHL totals			845	210	249	459	602	42	9	2	11	49

Awards and achievements
Preceded by Steve Janaszak	NCAA Tournament Most Outstanding Player; 1980	Succeeded by Marc Behrend
