= Darren Eliot =

Canadian ice hockey player and sports broadcaster

- Born: November 26, 1961 (age 64) Milton, Ontario, Canada
- Height: 6 ft 1 in (185 cm)
- Weight: 175 lb (79 kg; 12 st 7 lb)
- Position: Goaltender
- Caught: Right
- Played for: Los Angeles Kings; Detroit Red Wings; Buffalo Sabres
- National team: Canada
- NHL draft: 115th overall, 1980; Los Angeles Kings
- Playing career: 1984–1989

Darren Joseph Eliot (born November 26, 1961) is a Canadian sports broadcaster and a former professional ice hockey goaltender. He played 88 games in the National Hockey League for the Los Angeles Kings, Detroit Red Wings, and Buffalo Sabres between 1984 and 1989. Internationally he played for the Canadian national team at the 1984 Winter Olympics. He currently serves as Vice President of Hockey Programming and Facility Operations for the Vegas Golden Knights.

== Playing career ==
=== College ===
Eliot was born in Milton, Ontario. He graduated from Cornell University in 1983 with a degree in agricultural economics, having been elected to the Sphinx Head Society during his senior year. He earned membership into the Red Key Society for students exemplifying excellence in academics and athletics. With the Cornell Big Red men's ice hockey team, he was a two-time All-Ivy selection and was named an All-American as a senior. He was inducted into the Cornell Athletic Hall of Fame in 1996.

=== NHL career ===
Eliot was drafted in the sixth round, 115th overall, by the Los Angeles Kings in the 1980 NHL entry draft. Eliot played in the National Hockey League with the Kings, Detroit Red Wings, and Buffalo Sabres. Eliot played in 89 games and accumulated a record of 25–41–12.

=== International career ===
Eliot represented Team Canada at the 1984 Winter Olympics.

== Post-playing career ==
=== Detroit Red Wings ===
On September 12, 2014, it was announced that Eliot was named the new Director of Minor Hockey Operations for Little Caesars Amateur Hockey. In his new role, Eliot will oversee the day-to-day operations of the Little Caesars AAA hockey program and the Little Caesars Amateur Hockey League (LCAHL), along with serving as the organization's representative to USA Hockey, the Michigan Amateur Hockey Association (MAHA) and the High Performance Hockey League (HPHL).

=== Vegas Golden Knights ===
On February 13, 2019, it was announced that Eliot was named Vice President of Hockey Programming and Facility Operations for the Vegas Golden Knights. He will also oversee the Vegas Jr. Golden Knights program as the club's executive director.

=== Broadcasting career ===
Eliot worked as an in-studio analyst for Fox Sports Detroit's coverage of the Detroit Red Wings. He also contributes as an online columnist for Sports Illustrated. Previously, he worked as a national color analyst for Versus as well as locally for the Atlanta Thrashers telecasts on Fox Sports South and SportSouth. He also does occasional work for the Big Ten Network. Eliot served as the Ice Level Reporter for the 2016 Stanley Cup Finals on NBC Sports Radio. Eliot also served as the Ice Level analyst for TNT's coverage of the 2022 and 2024 Stanley Cup Playoffs.

== Career statistics ==
=== Regular season and playoffs ===
			Regular season									Playoffs
Season	Team	League	GP	W	L	T	MIN	GA	SO	GAA	SV%	GP	W	L	MIN	GA	SO	GAA	SV%
1977–78	Oshawa Parkway TV	Midget	18	—	—	—	1080	55	0	3.06	—	—	—	—	—	—	—	—	—
1978–79	Oshawa Legionaires	MetJBHL	26	—	—	—	1580	93	0	3.53	—	—	—	—	—	—	—	—	—
1979–80	Cornell University	ECAC	26	14	8	0	1362	94	0	4.14	.877	5	3	2	300	20	0	4.00	—
1980–81	Cornell University	ECAC	18	8	7	0	912	52	1	3.42	.904	3	1	1	119	7	0	2.33	—
1981–82	Cornell	ECAC	7	1	3	0	338	25	0	4.44	.863	—	—	—	—	—	—	—	—
1982–83	Cornell University	ECAC	26	13	10	3	1606	100	1	3.74	.892	—	—	—	—	—	—	—	—
1983–84	Canadian National Team	Intl	31	—	—	—	1676	111	0	3.97	—	—	—	—	—	—	—	—	—
1983–84	New Haven Nighthawks	AHL	7	4	1	0	365	30	0	4.93	.862	—	—	—	—	—	—	—	—
1984–85	Los Angeles Kings	NHL	33	12	11	6	1882	137	0	4.37	.855	—	—	—	—	—	—	—	—
1985–86	Los Angeles Kings	NHL	27	5	17	3	1481	121	0	4.90	.849	—	—	—	—	—	—	—	—
1985–86	New Haven Nighthawks	AHL	3	1	2	0	180	19	0	6.33	.830	1	0	1	60	4	0	4.00	—
1986–87	Los Angeles Kings	NHL	24	8	13	2	1404	103	1	4.40	.851	1	0	0	40	7	0	10.50	.759
1986–87	New Haven Nighthawks	AHL	4	2	2	0	239	15	0	3.77	.878	—	—	—	—	—	—	—	—
1987–88	Detroit Red Wings	NHL	3	0	0	1	97	9	0	5.57	.839	—	—	—	—	—	—	—	—
1987–88	Adirondack Red Wings	AHL	43	23	11	7	2445	136	0	3.34	.903	10	4	6	614	45	0	4.40	.877
1988–89	Rochester Americans	AHL	23	8	6	2	969	59	0	3.65	.871	—	—	—	—	—	—	—	—
1988–89	Buffalo Sabres	NHL	2	0	0	0	67	7	0	6.27	.837	—	—	—	—	—	—	—	—
NHL totals			89	25	41	12	4931	377	1	4.59	.851	1	0	0	40	7	0	10.50	.759

=== International ===
Year	Team	Event	GP	W	L	T	MIN	GA	SO	GAA	SV%
1984	Canada	OLY	2	0	0	0	40	2	0	3.00	—
Senior totals			2	0	0	0	40	2	0	3.00	—

== Awards and honors ==
Award	Year
All-ECAC Hockey First Team	1982–83
AHCA East All-American	1982–83

Awards and achievements
Preceded by Greg Moffett	ECAC Hockey Most Outstanding Player in Tournament; 1980	Succeeded by Kurt Kleinendorst
