= Ferris State Bulldogs men's ice hockey =

- Current season
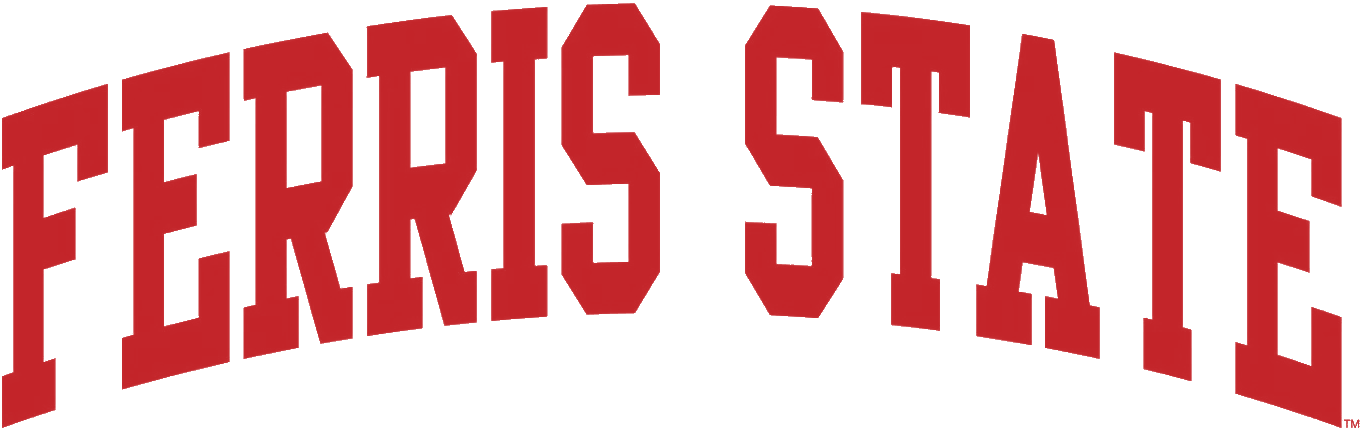
- University: Ferris State University
- Conference: CCHA; Division I Division
- First season: 1975–76
- Head coach: Brett Riley; 1st season, 8–27–2 (.243)
- Assistant coaches: Zack Cisek; Justin DeMartino; Gehrig Sarosy
- Arena: Ewigleben Arena; Big Rapids, Michigan
- Colors: Crimson and gold

NCAA tournament runner-up
- 2012

NCAA tournament Frozen Four
- 2012

NCAA tournament appearances
- 2003, 2012, 2014, 2016

Conference tournament champions
- WCHA: 2016

Conference regular season champions
- CCHA: 2003, 2012; WCHA: 2014

Current uniform

The Ferris State Bulldogs men's ice hockey team is an NCAA Division I college ice hockey program that represents Ferris State University. The Bulldogs are a member of the Central Collegiate Hockey Association (CCHA). They play at Ewigleben Arena in Big Rapids, Michigan.

== History ==
Ferris State's ice hockey program began in 1975 as a member of the NAIA and joined the CCHA as an affiliate member. In the program's four seasons in the NAIA the team compiled an overall record of 58-40-1-.591, including three seasons above .700 winning percentage and a program best winning percentage of .795 in the 1976–77 season. The program moved up to NCAA Division I status and became a full member of the CCHA in 1979. They joined the WCHA in 2013 before returning to the CCHA prior to the 2021–22 season.

Ferris State turned in its best season performance ever in the program's NCAA Division I history for the 2002-03 campaign with a school-best 31-10-1 overall record. The Ferris Bulldogs also claimed their first-ever CCHA Regular-Season Championship title with a first-place 22-5-1 league mark. Ferris State received an at-large bid to the 2003 NCAA Tournament and beat North Dakota 5-2 and advanced to the West Regional title game in their initial NCAA Tourney appearance, before losing a high scoring game to Minnesota 4–7. FSU also earned the distinction of being the nation's first team to reach the 30-win plateau in 2002-03 and also competed in the CCHA Super Six Championship Tourney for the first time since 1993.

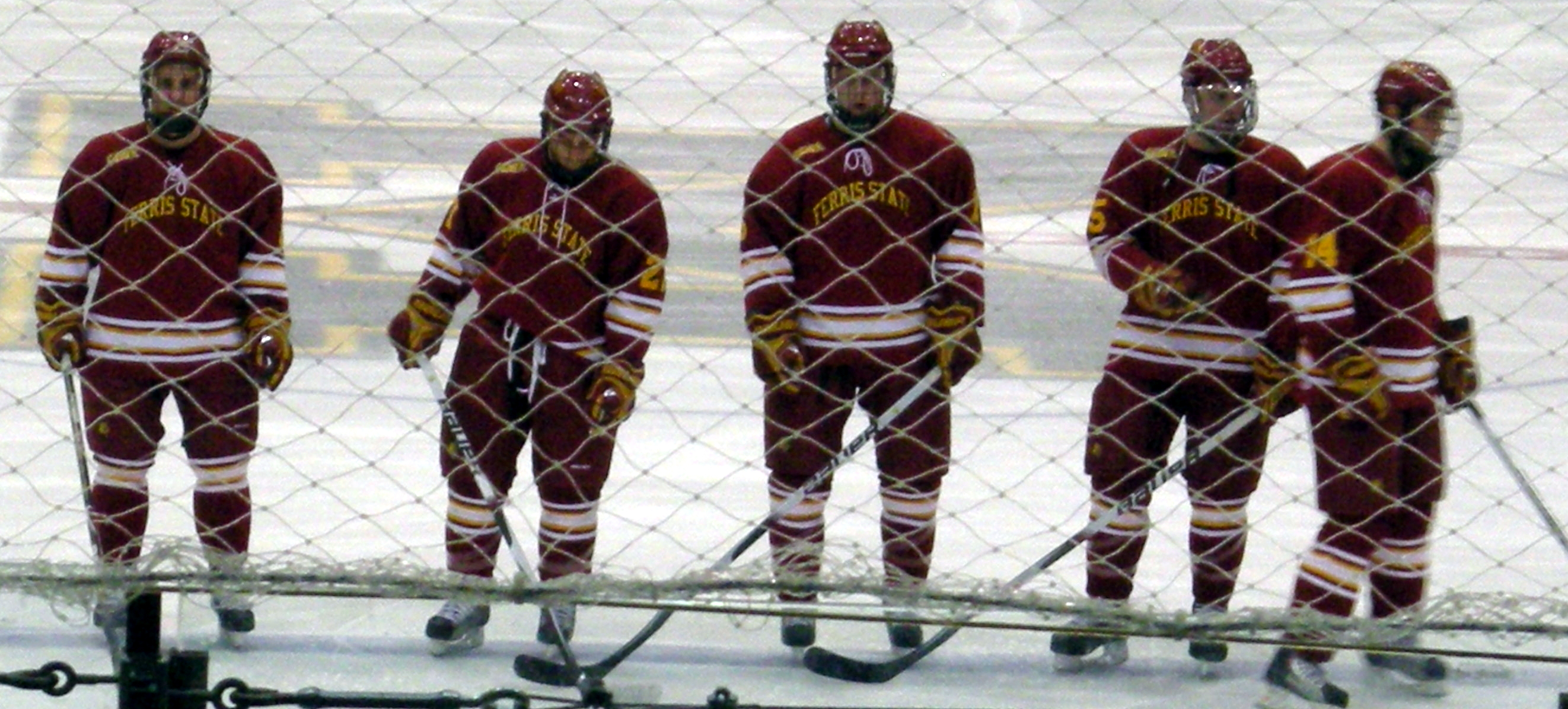
Ferris State's starting lineup for a 2009–10 game against Michigan

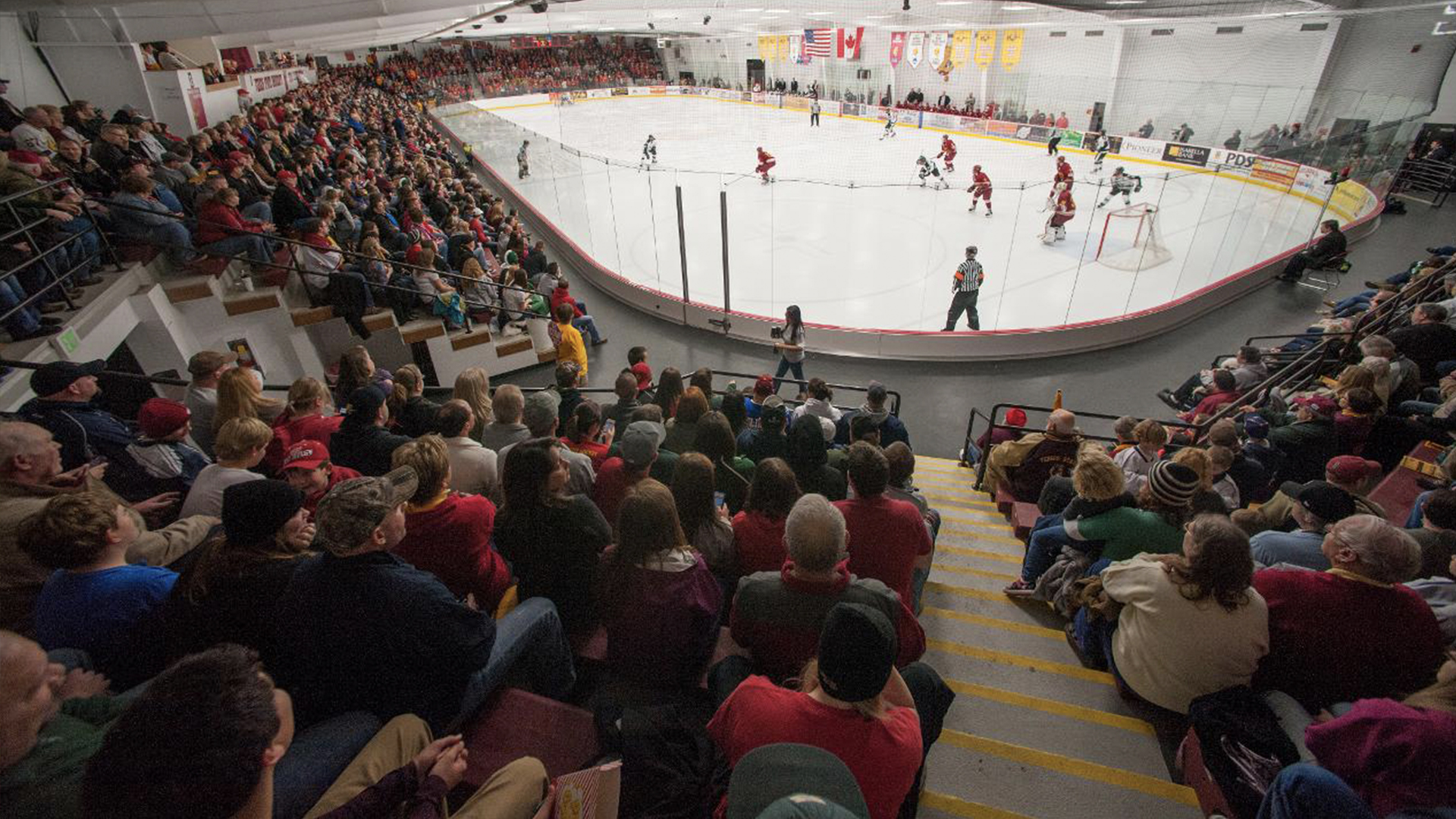
Ferris State's Ewigleben Arena, June 2015

The 2011–12 season was historic for the Ferris State ice hockey program. The Bulldogs began the season on a six-game win streak, their best start to a season since 1979-80 when The Bulldogs recorded an eight-game streak. The team ended the regular season with their first CCHA Regular Season Championship since the program's first in 2002–03. The season was highlighted by a 14-game unbeaten streak from January 6, 2012, to February 25 in which the team recorded 11 wins and 4 ties. The Bulldogs were also ranked first in the NCAA men's ice hockey poll for a two-week period in the season for the first time in school history. After the team finished with the top record in the CCHA, the Bulldogs received a first round bye for the 2012 CCHA Tournament. Ferris State played Bowling Green in the second round, after the Falcons upset Northern Michigan. In the best-of-three series, the Falcons picked up a win in overtime in the opening game followed by goal outburst in the second game that saw Ferris State even the series with a 7–4 win. In the final game of the series, Ferris State was unable to hold on to a three-goal lead as BGSU rallied back to force overtime. The Falcons scored in the extra period to win the CCHA quarterfinal series. Despite the loss in the CCHA playoffs, the Bulldogs received an at-large bid to the 2012 NCAA Tournament. Ferris State defeated Denver and Cornell in the first two rounds of the tournament with a pair of 2-1 games. In the program's first appearance in the Frozen Four, the Bulldogs defeated Union 3-1 and advanced to the championship game against Boston College. Ferris State was unable to stop the Eagles' offense en route to BC's third title in five seasons. The team finished with a record of 26-12-5.

== Season-by-season results ==
Source:

== Coaches ==
The team has been coached by Bob Daniels since 1992. Daniels is a two-time recipient of the Spencer Penrose Award, awarded by the American Hockey Coaches Association to the NCAA men's ice hockey coach of the year, having won the award in 2003 and 2012. In 2012, he was also named the Central Collegiate Hockey Association coach of the year after he led the Bulldogs to their first appearance in the Frozen Four and NCAA championship game. Daniels is the longest tenured coach of the Bulldogs and is the only coach in program history to record over 300 wins.

As of completion of 2025–26 season

Tenure	Coach	Years	Record	Pct.
1975–1982	Rick Duffett	7	119–83–7	.586
1982–1986	Dick Bertrand	4	56–74–9	.435
1986	Peter Esdale †	1 †	6–9–1	.406
1986–1990	John Perpich	4	54–92–17	.383
1990–1991	Bob Mancini	2	36–32–12	.525
1992–2025	Bob Daniels	33	510–625–117	.454
2025–Present	Brett Riley	1	8–27–2	.243
Totals	7 coaches	51 seasons	789–942–165	.460

† Esdale replaced Bertrand in January 1986.

== Awards and honors ==
=== NCAA ===
Spencer Penrose Award

- Bob Daniels: 2003, 2012

AHCA First Team All-Americans

- 1993-94: John Gruden, D
- 2002-03: Mike Brown, G; Chris Kunitz, F
- 2010-11: Pat Nagle, G
- 2011-12: Taylor Nelson, G

AHCA Second Team All-Americans

- 1995-96: Andy Roach, D
- 1996-97: Andy Roach, D
- 2001-02: Rob Collins, F
- 2010-11: Zach Redmond, D
- 2011-12: Chad Billins, D

=== WCHA ===
==== Individual awards ====
Rookie of the Year

- Corey Mackin, F: 2016
- Cooper Zech, F: 2019

Defensive player of the year

- Aaron MacKenzie, 2003
- Ryan Caldwell, 2004
- Matt Carle, 2006

Scoring Champion

- Gerald Mayhew, F: 2017

Student-Athlete of the Year

- Chad McDonald, F: 2017

Coach of the Year

- Bob Daniels: 2014

Most Valuable Player in Tournament

- Darren Smith, G: 2016

==== All-WCHA ====
First Team All-WCHA

- 2013–14: C. J. Motte, G
- 2016–17: Gerald Mayhew, F
- 2018–19: Cooper Zech, D

Second team all-wcha

- 2013–14: Scott Czarnowczan, D; Garrett Thompson, F
- 2015–16: Gerald Mayhew, F

Third Team All-WCHA

- 2013–14: Jason Binkley, D
- 2014–15: C. J. Motte, G
- 2015–16: Brandon Anselmini, D
- 2016–17: Justin Kapelmaster, G
- 2017–18: Ryker Killins, D

WCHA All-Rookie Team

- 2013–14: Kyle Schempp, F
- 2015–16: Corey Mackin, F
- 2018–19: Cooper Zech, D
- 2019–20: Jake Willets, D

=== CCHA ===
==== Individual awards ====
Player of the Year

- Chris Kunitz: 2003

Rookie of the Year

- John DePourcq: 1988
- Bradley Marek: 2022

Best Offensive Defenseman

- John Gruden: 1994
- Andy Roach: 1996

Terry Flanagan Memorial Award

- Craig Lisko: 1994
- Aaron Lewicki: 2010

Perani Cup

- Mike Brown: 2003
- Aaron Lewicki: 2010

Scholar-Athlete of the Year

- Chad Billins: 2012

Coach of the Year

- Bob Daniels: 2003, 2012

==== All-CCHA ====
First Team All-CCHA

- 1979–80: Jim Baker, F
- 1979–80: Jim File, D; George Harrison, D
- 1981–82: Jim File, D
- 1993–94: John Gruden, D
- 1995–96: Andy Roach, D
- 1996–97: Andy Roach, D
- 1998–99: Paul Comrie, F
- 2001–02: Chris Kunitz, F; Rob Collins, F
- 2002–03: Mike Brown, G; Chris Kunitz, F
- 2010–11: Pat Nagle, G; Zach Redmond, D
- 2011–12: Taylor Nelson, G; Chad Billins, D

Second team all-ccha

- 1979–80: Paul Pickard, D
- 1983–84: Jim File, D; Randy Merrifield, F
- 1990–91: Rod Taylor, F
- 1994–95: Andy Roach, D
- 1997–98: Brett Colborne, D
- 1999–00: Brian McCullough, F
- 2000–01: Phil Osaer, G
- 2002–03: Simon Mangos, D; Troy Milam, D; Jeff Legue, F
- 2009–10: Zach Redmond, D
- 2011–12: Jordie Johnston, F
- 2012–13: Juho Olkinuora, G; Joey LaLeggia, D
- 2024–25: Travis Shoudy, D

CCHA All-Rookie Team

- 1990–91: Pat Mazzoli, G
- 1993–94: Andy Roach, D
- 1994–95: Jason Blake, F
- 1997–98: Kevin Swider, F
- 2001–02: Mike Brown, G; Matt York, D
- 2005–06: Dan Riedel, F
- 2021–22: Bradley Marek, F
- 2023–24: Luigi Benincasa, F

== Olympians ==
This is a list of Ferris State alumni who played on an Olympic team.

Name	Position	Ferris State Tenure	Team	Year	Finish
Bob Nardella	Defense	1988–1991	Italy	1998, 2006	12th, 11th
Norm Krumpschmid	Center	1988–1992	Austria	1998	14th
Jason Blake	Center	1994–1995	(United States) USA	2006	8th
Chris Kunitz	Left wing	1999–2003	Canada	2014	Gold
Chad Billins	Defenseman	2008–2012	(United States) USA	2018	7th
Pat Nagle	Goaltender	2007–2011	(United States) USA	2022	5th

== Statistical leaders ==
=== Career points leaders ===
Player	Years	GP	G	A	Pts	PIM
Paul Lowden	1983–1987	158	101	107	208	76
Jim Baker	1978–1982	137	82	123	205	132
John DePourcq	1987–1991	145	73	130	203	52
Peter Lowden	1983–1987	158	74	125	199	81
Rod Schluter	1984–1989	164	93	96	189	251
Paul Cook	1979–1983	139	76	99	175	105
Chris Kunitz	1999–2003	152	99	76	175	275
Perry Zoldak	1976–1981	124	60	112	172	105
Jeff Legue	2001–2005	152	67	90	157	147
Randy Strong	1978–1982	136	69	83	152	276

=== Career goaltending leaders ===
Source: GP = Games played; Min = Minutes played; W = Wins; L = Losses; T = Ties; GA = Goals against; SO = Shutouts; SV% = Save percentage; GAA = Goals against average

Minimum 30 games

Player	Years	GP	Min	W	L	T	GA	SO	SV%	GAA
C. J. Motte	2011–2015	127	7679	66	49	12	272	15	.926	2.13
Phil Osaer	1998–2001	59	3198	24	22	6	116	2	.916	2.18
Pat Nagle	2007–2011	101	5801	45	42	11	224	5	.916	2.32
Taylor Nelson	2008–2012	70	4031	35	20	10	157	4	.917	2.34
Mitch O'Keefe	2005–2008	86	5074	31	39	15	227	6	.903	2.68

Statistics current through the end of the 2023–24 season.

== Ferris State Athletic Hall of Fame ==
The following is a list of people associated with the Ferris State men's ice hockey program who were elected into the Ferris State Athletic Hall of Fame (induction date in parentheses).

- Jim Baker (2002)
- John DePourcq (2002)
- Paul Lowden (2003)
- Jim File (2004)
- Peter Lowden (2004)
- Randy Merrifield (2005)
- John Gruden (2007)
- Andy Roach (2009)

== Current roster ==
As of August 30, 2025.

No.	Nat.	Player	Class	Pos	Height	Weight	DoB	Hometown	Previous team	NHL rights
1	(United States)	Mason West	Freshman (RS)	G	6' 1" (1.85 m)	170 lb (77 kg)	2004-10-18	Traverse City, Michigan	Peoria Mustangs (NA3HL)	—
2	(United States)	Kade Turner	Sophomore	F	6' 0" (1.83 m)	185 lb (84 kg)	2003-02-04	Calgary, Alberta	Okotoks Oilers (BCHL)	—
3	(United States)	Logan Heroux	Sophomore	D	6' 1" (1.85 m)	190 lb (86 kg)	2003-05-30	Middletown, New Jersey	Shreveport Mudbugs (NAHL)	—
4	(Norway)	Christopher Lie	Sophomore	D	5' 10" (1.78 m)	163 lb (74 kg)	2005-07-27	Hamar, Norway	Malmö Redhawks J20 (J20 Nationell)	—
5	(Finland)	Valtteri Piironen	Senior	D	6' 4" (1.93 m)	201 lb (91 kg)	2001-09-11	Joensuu, Finland	Long Island (NCAA)	—
6	(Canada)	Xavier Jean-Louis	Senior	D	6' 5" (1.96 m)	205 lb (93 kg)	2001-06-25	Montreal, Quebec	Alaska (NCAA)	—
7	(Canada)	Connor McGrath	Senior	F	5' 9" (1.75 m)	184 lb (83 kg)	2003-09-04	Leroy, Saskatchewan	Humboldt Broncos (SJHL)	—
8	(Canada)	Tyler Schleppe	Senior	F	6' 4" (1.93 m)	220 lb (100 kg)	2001-11-11	Vancouver, British Columbia	Langley Rivermen (BCHL)	—
9	(United States)	Nic Belpedio	Graduate	D	5' 10" (1.78 m)	194 lb (88 kg)	2001-10-09	Skokie, Illinois	Colgate (ECAC)	—
10	(United States)	Jack Mesic	Junior	D	5' 9" (1.75 m)	176 lb (80 kg)	2002-10-18	Plymouth, Michigan	Western Michigan (NCHC)	—
11	(United States)	Brian Morse	Freshman (RS)	D	6' 1" (1.85 m)	165 lb (75 kg)	2003-02-06	Fresno, California	Maine (HEA)	—
12	(United States)	Caden Brown	Senior (RS)	D	5' 11" (1.8 m)	185 lb (84 kg)	2003-06-22	St. Louis, Missouri	Ohio State (Big Ten)	—
13	(Canada)	Josh Zary	Senior	F	6' 0" (1.83 m)	190 lb (86 kg)	2001-10-15	Nanaimo, British Columbia	Long Island (NCAA)	—
15	(United States)	Jack Silich	Sophomore	F	5' 10" (1.78 m)	179 lb (81 kg)	2003-06-20	Long Grove, Illinois	Cranbrook Bucks (BCHL)	—
16	(Canada)	Holden Doell	Junior	F	5' 11" (1.8 m)	185 lb (84 kg)	2003-12-01	Martensville, Saskatchewan	Battlefords North Stars (SJHL)	—
17	(United States)	Luke Lisko	Sophomore	F	6' 1" (1.85 m)	181 lb (82 kg)	2004-05-24	Marine City, Michigan	Sherwood Park Crusaders (BCHL)	—
18	(United States)	Max Dukovac	Junior	F	6' 2" (1.88 m)	182 lb (83 kg)	2002-02-19	Aurora, Illinois	Miami (NCHC)	—
19	(United States)	Max Itagaki	Senior	F	5' 5" (1.65 m)	155 lb (70 kg)	2002-06-18	Glenview, Illinois	Army (AHA)	—
20	(United States)	Andrew Noel	Junior	D	6' 1" (1.85 m)	200 lb (91 kg)	2001-01-02	Maynard, Massachusetts	Nanaimo Clippers (BCHL)	—
21	(United States)	Tanner Rowe	Junior	F	6' 1" (1.85 m)	179 lb (81 kg)	2002-08-26	Calumet, Michigan	Michigan (Big Ten)	—
22	(United States)	Emerson Goode	Junior	F	5' 9" (1.75 m)	180 lb (82 kg)	2002-10-16	Anaheim, California	Odessa Jackalopes (NAHL)	—
23	(Canada)	Riley Wallack	Senior	F	6' 5" (1.96 m)	225 lb (102 kg)	2001-04-05	South Surrey, British Columbia	Long Island (NCAA)	—
24	(United States)	Conner Brown	Sophomore	D	6' 0" (1.83 m)	190 lb (86 kg)	2003-12-23	Maplewood, Minnesota	Janesville Jets (NAHL)	—
26	(United States)	Jacob Badal	Senior	F	6' 0" (1.83 m)	205 lb (93 kg)	2001-10-05	Flushing, Michigan	Johnstown Tomahawks (NAHL)	—
27	(United States)	Gavin Best	Senior	F	6' 2" (1.88 m)	190 lb (86 kg)	2001-08-24	Richfield, Minnesota	Michigan State (Big Ten)	—
28	(United States)	Trevor Taulien	Junior	D	6' 4" (1.93 m)	225 lb (102 kg)	2003-04-14	Crystal Lake, Illinois	Odessa Jackalopes (NAHL)	—
30	(United States)	Hobie Hedquist	Junior	G	6' 2" (1.88 m)	192 lb (87 kg)	2003-02-14	Heron Lake, Minnesota	North Dakota (NCHC)	—
31	(United States)	Noah Rupprecht	Junior	G	5' 11" (1.8 m)	180 lb (82 kg)	2002-06-15	Thief River Falls, Minnesota	Long Island (NCAA)	—
34	(United States)	Carter Rapalje	Junior (RS)	F	5' 10" (1.78 m)	170 lb (77 kg)	2001-08-10	Colorado Springs, Colorado	Long Island (NCAA)	—
55	(Norway)	Martin Lundberg	Sophomore	G	6' 1" (1.85 m)	172 lb (78 kg)	2005-02-04	Furuberget, Norway	Mora IK J20 (J20 Nationell)	—

== Bulldogs in the NHL ==
As of July 1, 2025.

= NHL All-Star team	= NHL All-Star	= NHL All-Star and NHL All-Star team

Player	Position	Team(s)	Years	Games	Stanley Cups
Chad Billins	Defenseman	CGY	2013–2014	10	0
Jason Blake	Right wing	LAK, NYI, TOR, ANA	1998–2012	871	0
Dean Clark	Left wing	EDM	1983–1984	1	0
Rob Collins	Right wing	NYI	2005–2006	8	0
Mike Colman	Defenseman	SJS	1991–1992	15	0
John Gruden	Defenseman	BOS, OTT, WAS	1993–2004	92	0
Dave Karpa	Defenseman	QUE, ANA, CAR, NYR	1991–2003	557	0
Chris Kunitz	Left wing	ANA, ATL, PIT, TBL, CHI	2003–2019	1,022	4
Gerald Mayhew	Right wing	MIN, PHI, ANA	2019–2022	57	0
Greg Rallo	Center	FLA	2011–2013	11	0
Zach Redmond	Defenseman	WPG, COL, MTL, BUF	2012–2018	133	0
Andy Roach	Defenseman	STL	2005–2006	5	0

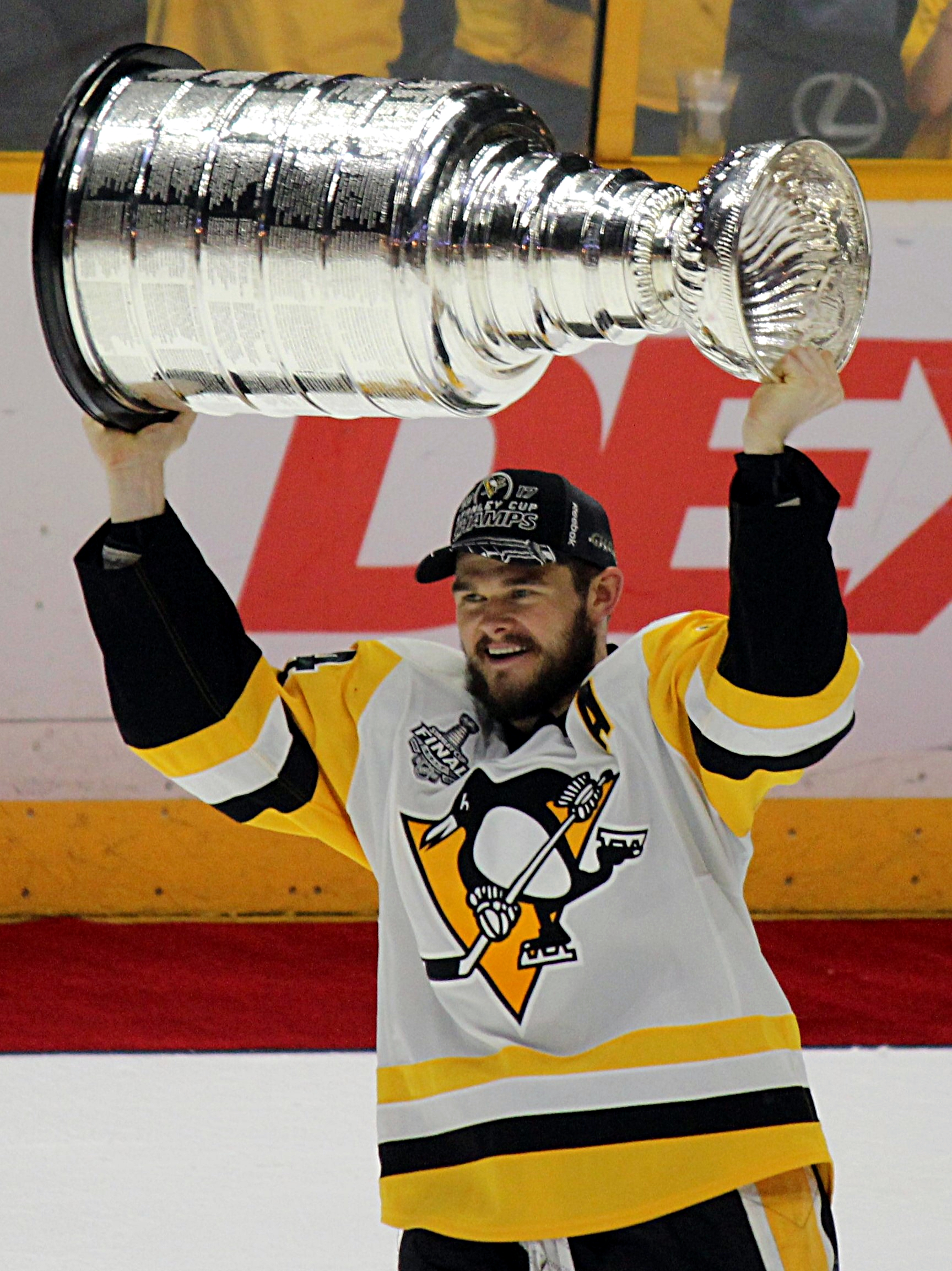
Chris Kunitz

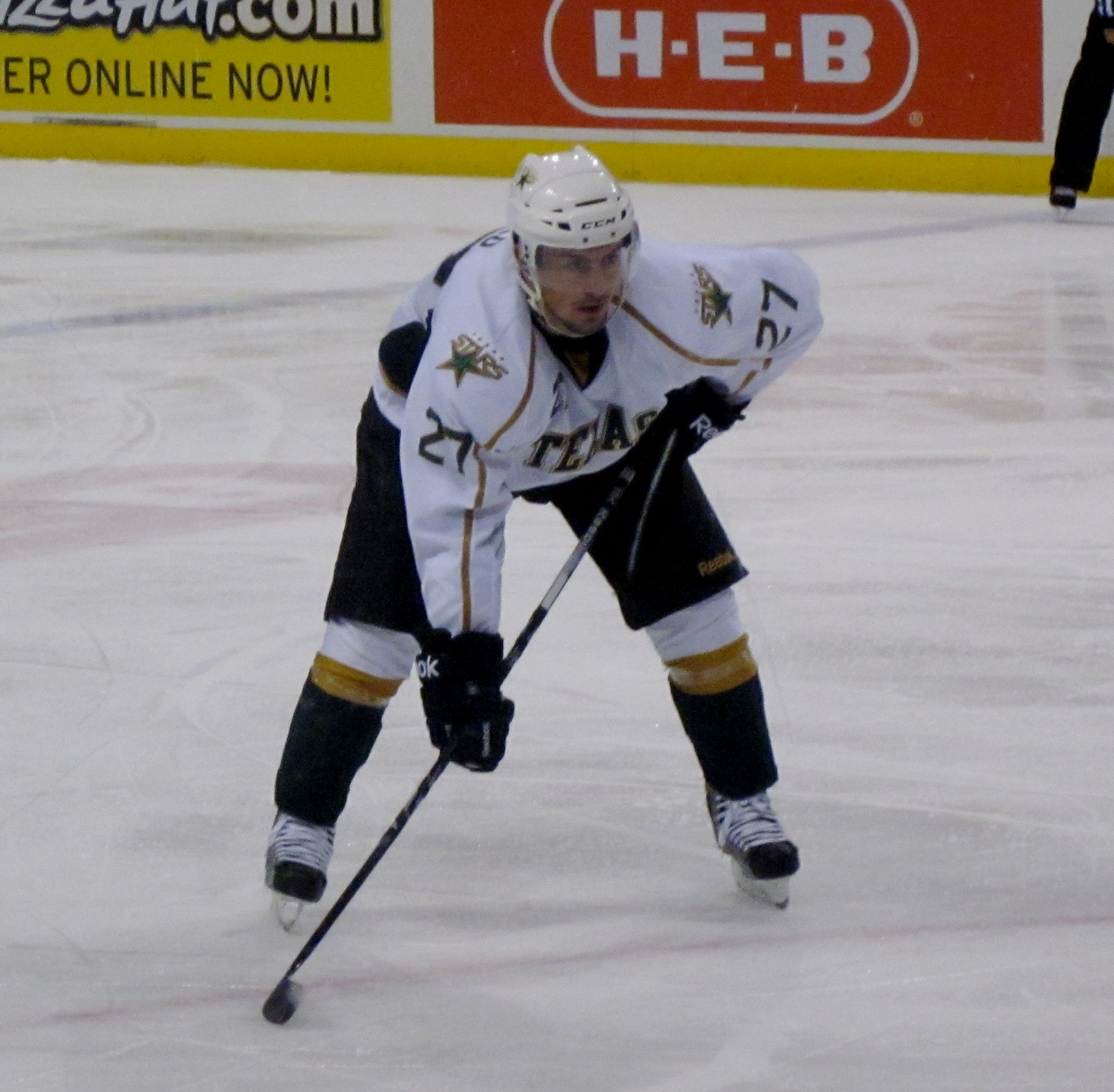
Greg Rallo

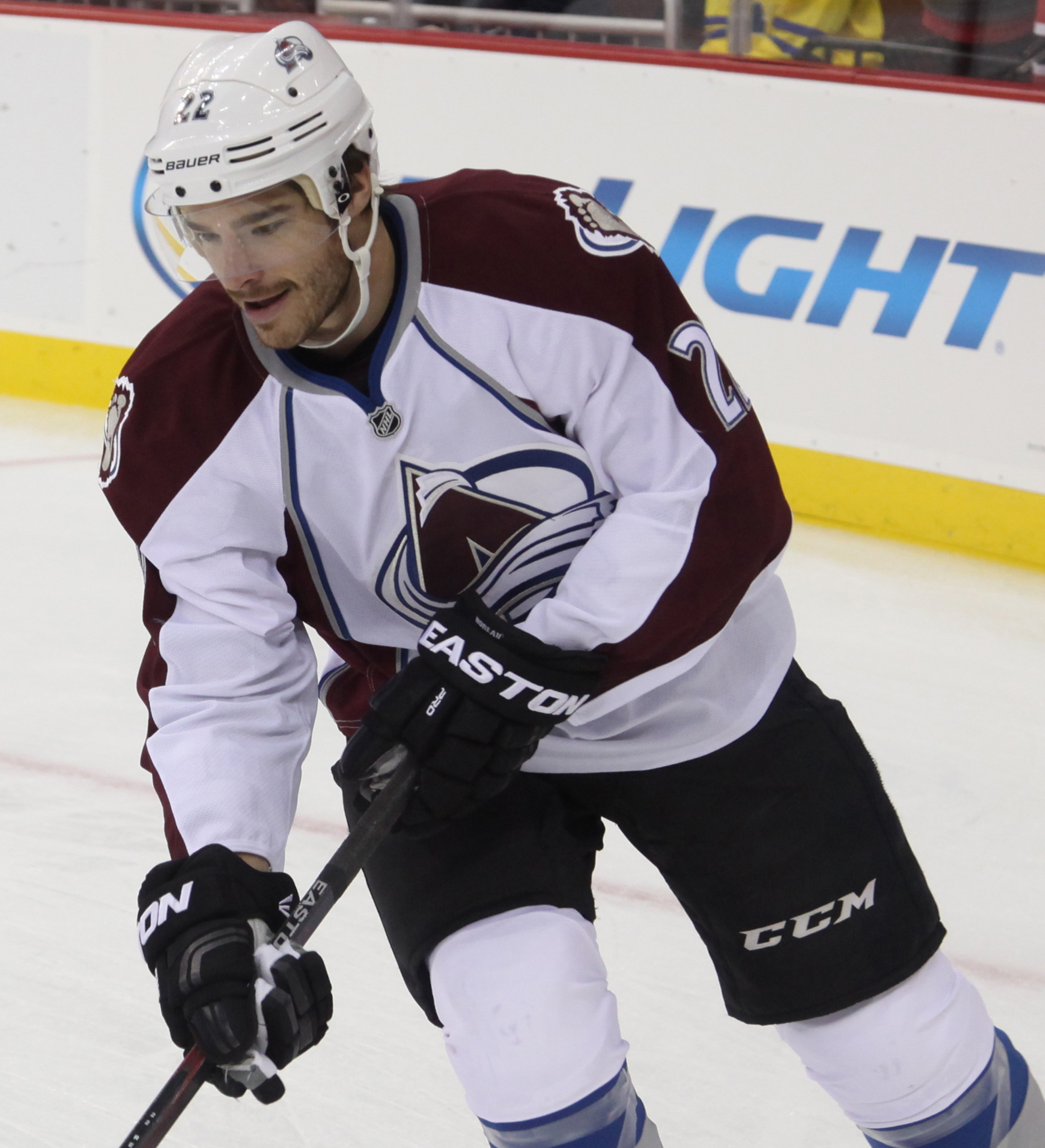
Zach Redmond
