= Swift Current Broncos (SJHL) =

Canadian junior ice hockey team (1974–1986)

- City: Swift Current, Saskatchewan
- League: Saskatchewan Junior Hockey League
- Operated: 1974-1986

Franchise history
- 1974-1983: Swift Current Broncos
- 1983–1986: Swift Current Indians

The Swift Current Broncos were a Canadian Junior "A" ice hockey team based out of Swift Current, Saskatchewan that played in the Saskatchewan Junior Hockey League from 1974 to 1986. From 1983 to 1986, the team was known as the Swift Current Indians.

== History ==
The Swift Current Broncos of the Saskatchewan Junior Hockey League were created in the wake of the Western Canada Hockey League's (WCHL) Swift Current Broncos departure to Lethbridge in 1974. The new SJHL team adopted the nickname "Broncos" for its first nine seasons, from the 1974-75 through the 1982–83 seasons, despite the fact that another SJHL team, the Humboldt Broncos, was already using the same nickname. In addition to regular season games, these competing Broncos teams met four times in the SJHL playoffs (1976, 1978, 1979, 1981).

The Swift Current team changed its nickname to the "Indians" for their final three SJHL seasons, from 1983 to 1984 through 1985–86. The SJHL team folded in 1986 when the original WCHL (by then renamed the Western Hockey League) Broncos returned to the Swift Current in 1986.

The Broncos won the SJHL Championship in their first ever season in the league. Ten out of twelve of Swift Current's seasons were winning seasons.

== Season-by-season standings ==
Season	GP	W	L	T	OTL	GF	GA	P	Results	Playoffs
1974–75	58	42	16	0	-	317	185	84	1st SJHL	Won League
1975–76	58	43	14	1	-	338	241	87	2nd SJHL North	Lost semi-final
1976–77	60	43	17	0	-	316	228	86	2nd SJHL North	Lost semi-final
1977–78	59	34	23	2	-	327	233	70	2nd SJHL North	Lost semi-final
1978–79	60	40	19	1	-	333	212	81	2nd SJHL North	Lost semi-final
1979–80	60	39	20	1	-	361	269	79	2nd SJHL North	Lost semi-final
1980–81	60	30	28	2	-	355	310	62	3rd SJHL North	Lost quarter-final
1981–82	60	32	27	1	-	319	293	65	3rd SJHL North	Lost semi-final
1982–83	64	30	33	1	-	345	366	61	5th SJHL	Lost quarter-final
1983–84	64	16	47	1	-	239	380	33	9th SJHL	DNQ
1984–85	64	39	24	1	-	346	297	79	4th SJHL	Lost quarter-final
1985–86	60	19	40	1	-	281	406	39	8th SJHL	Lost semi-final

=== Playoffs ===
- 1975 Won League, lost Anavet Cup

Swift Current Broncos defeated Regina Blues 4-games-to-2
Swift Current Broncos defeated Weyburn Red Wings 4-games-to-1
Swift Current Broncos defeated Prince Albert Raiders 4-games-to-2 SJHL CHAMPIONS
Selkirk Steelers (MJHL) defeated Swift Current Broncos 4-games-to-none

- 1976 Lost semi-final

Swift Current Broncos defeated Humboldt Broncos 4-games-to-2
Prince Albert Raiders defeated Swift Current Broncos 4-games-to-none

- 1977 Lost semi-final

Swift Current Broncos defeated Battleford Barons 4-games-to-1
Prince Albert Raiders defeated Swift Current Broncos 4-games-to-1

- 1978 Lost semi-final

Swift Current Broncos defeated Humboldt Broncos 4-games-to-none
Prince Albert Raiders defeated Swift Current Broncos 4-games-to-3

- 1979 Lost semi-final

Swift Current Broncos defeated Humboldt Broncos 4-games-to-3
Prince Albert Raiders defeated Swift Current Broncos 4-games-to-3

- 1980 Lost semi-final

Swift Current Broncos defeated Battleford Barons 4-games-to-1
Prince Albert Raiders defeated Swift Current Broncos 4-games-to-2

- 1981 Lost quarter-final

Humboldt Broncos defeated Swift Current Broncos 4-games-to-none

- 1982 Lost semi-final

Swift Current Broncos defeated Saskatoon Olympics 4-games-to-2
Prince Albert Raiders defeated Swift Current Broncos 4-games-to-none

- 1983 Lost quarter-final

Melville Millionaires defeated Swift Current Broncos 4-games-to-none

- 1984 DNQ
- 1985 Lost quarter-final

Humboldt Broncos defeated Swift Current Indians 4-games-to-2

- 1986 Lost semi-final

Swift Current Indians defeated Battlefords North Stars 4-games-to-2
Humboldt Broncos defeated Swift Current Indians 4-games-to-none
