= Bill Joyce (ice hockey) =

Canadian ice hockey player

- Born: November 29, 1957 (age 68) Mississauga, Ontario, Canada
- Height: 5 ft 8 in (173 cm)
- Weight: 174 lb (79 kg; 12 st 6 lb)
- Position: Right Wing
- Shot: Right
- Played for: Northern Michigan; Milwaukee Admirals; Richmond Rifles; Toledo Goaldiggers; Flint Generals
- Playing career: 1976–1985

William Joyce (born November 29, 1957) is a Canadian retired ice hockey right wing who was the NCAA Scoring Champion in 1979–80.

== Career ==
Joyce was a member of the inaugural recruiting class for Northern Michigan University when the ice hockey team was promoted to varsity status. He finished second on the team in scoring as a freshman and helped the team to a winning record in their first season. The program joined the CCHA beginning in 1977 and the team was good enough to finish in the top half of the conference. Joyce continued to finish second in team scoring behind Mike Mielke in each of this first three seasons. As a senior, Joyce's scoring exploded and he led the nation with 96 points, besting his previous record by nearly 40 points. Joyce led the Wildcats to a first place finish in the CCHA as well as the program's first conference championship and NCAA tournament appearance. Unfortunately, because the CCHA was still seen as a lesser conference, Joyce was not named an All-American (no players for the CCHA received that honor in 1980). Northern Michigan surprised many in college hockey by winning their first two tournament games to make the 1980 championship game. Joyce scored the first goal for the Wildcats in the title tilt but it came after they were already behind 0–4 and didn't change the outcome.

After graduating, Joyce began his professional career with a short appearance in 1981 before finding a home with the Toledo Goaldiggers in 1982. He finished second on the team with 112 points and helped the club win both the regular season title and the Turner Cup. Joyce remained with the team for another two and half years, helping them to a second championship in 1983, and finished his career out with the Flint Generals in 1985.

Joyce was inducted into the Northern Michigan Athletic Hall of Fame in 1998 and remains the team's All-Time leading scorer as of 2021. When the CCHA ceased operations after the 2013 season, Joyce was named to the All-Time CCHA Second Team, the only Wildcat to make an appearance.

== Career statistics ==
=== Regular season and playoffs ===
			Regular Season					Playoffs
Season	Team	League	GP	G	A	Pts	PIM	GP	G	A	Pts	PIM
1973–74	Bramalea Blues	MJBHL	40	27	29	56	75	—	—	—	—	—
1974–75	Bramalea Blues	MJBHL	—	—	—	—	—	—	—	—	—	—
1975–76	St. Catharines Black Hawks	OHA	3	0	1	1	0	—	—	—	—	—
1976–77	Northern Michigan	CCHA	28	21	26	47	64	—	—	—	—	—
1977–78	Northern Michigan	CCHA	33	24	31	55	61	—	—	—	—	—
1978–79	Northern Michigan	CCHA	29	26	31	57	69	—	—	—	—	—
1979–80	Northern Michigan	CCHA	40	41	55	96	40	—	—	—	—	—
1980–81	Milwaukee Admirals	IHL	6	0	0	0	0	—	—	—	—	—
1980–81	Richmond Rifles	EHL	2	0	1	1	0	—	—	—	—	—
1981–82	Toledo Goaldiggers	IHL	78	40	72	112	75	13	8	9	17	39
1982–83	Toledo Goaldiggers	IHL	64	33	48	81	118	11	2	12	14	11
1983–84	Toledo Goaldiggers	IHL	63	26	35	61	97	12	4	5	9	26
1984–85	Toledo Goaldiggers	IHL	33	12	11	23	64	—	—	—	—	—
1984–85	Flint Generals	IHL	17	5	7	12	4	—	—	—	—	—
NCAA Totals			130	112	143	255	234	—	—	—	—	—
IHL Totals			261	116	173	289	358	—	—	—	—	—

== Awards and honors ==
Award	Year
All-CCHA First Team	1977–78
All-CCHA First Team	1979–80

Awards and achievements
Preceded by Mark Johnson	NCAA Ice Hockey Scoring Champion; 1979–80	Succeeded by Aaron Broten
