= Bruno Baseotto =

Canadian ice hockey player

- Born: March 24, 1960 (age 66) Calgary, Alberta, Canada
- Height: 5 ft 10 in (178 cm)
- Weight: 170 lb (77 kg; 12 st 2 lb)
- Position: Right Wing
- Shot: Right
- Played for: Michigan; Calgary Wranglers; Flint Generals; Fort Wayne Komets; New Brunswick Hawks; HC Gherdëina; Calgary; HC Bolzano; HC Devils Milano
- National team: Italy
- Playing career: 1980–1993 Coaching career

Coaching career (HC unless noted)
- 1993–1997: Calgary Royals
- 1997–2000: Seattle Thunderbirds (asst.)
- 2000–2004: Saskatoon Blades (asst.)
- 2004–2005: Tri-City Americans (asst.)

Head coaching record
- Overall: 91–130–15 (.417)

Bruno Baseotto is a Canadian-born Italian retired ice hockey right winger and coach. He won four separate Italian League championships with two teams in the 1980s and 1990s.

== Playing career ==
A Calgary native, Baseotto played junior hockey for his hometown Calgary Canucks. He was a top scorer for the club, helping the club win the league championship in 1978 and then paced the team in scoring the following year as they reached the championship but were unable to repeat. In the fall of 1979 be began attending the University of Michigan and helped turn around a program coming off of one of the worst seasons in its history. Baseotto helped the Wolverines win 15 more games in 1980 and finished 7th in the nation in scoring. He returned the following season, but after just 2 games, new head coach Wilf Martin resigned due to ill health. At the same time the team was going through a hazing scandal that saw three of his teammates suspended. While Baseotto was not a part of the scandal, he had been unhappy with his treatment by the team and news of the hazing incident convinced him to leave.

Baseotto returned home to Calgary and played for the Calgary Wranglers while continuing his studies at the University of Calgary. He led the Wranglers in scoring and led the team to the team to the league finals, losing in seven games to the Victoria Cougars. His scoring exploits in the junior and college ranks enabled Baseotto to sign his first professional contract the following year and he spent most of the year with the Fort Wayne Komets, producing at a near point-per-game pace. Despite the solid numbers, Baseotto decided to leave minor league hockey behind and travelled to Italy to play for HC Gherdëina. True to form, he led the club in scoring by averaging more than 3 points per game and led them to a runner-up finish for the league championship.

After the year abroad, Baseotto finished his collegiate career with the Calgary Dinos in 1984. He then returned to Italy and made a home for himself in his new country. Baseotto joined HC Bolzano and arrived in time to help the team win the league championship in 1985. He remained one of the team best offensive players over the next 4 years and helped them win another championship in 1988. During that season, Baseotto made his first appearance with the Italian national team, however, because the team had finished 14th in the 1987 Ice Hockey World Championships, they were left out of the 1988 Winter Olympics. With Baseotto on the national team, Italy performed much better at the next World Championships and finished as the group B runners-up in 1989. While the team was unable to win promotion at the time, their elevated level of play put the Italians on the right path and they returned to Olympic competition in 1992.

In 1989 Baseotto joined the newly founded HC Devils Milano and led the team in scoring in their inaugural year. Baseotto remained a key figure for the team as it swiftly rose to the top of the league. In 1991 he played with future hall-of-famer Jari Kurri during his year-long contract dispute with the Edmonton Oilers. Baseotto later helped the club win consecutive championships in 1992 and 1993 before retiring as a player.

Baseotto began his coaching career in 1993 by returning to his roots. He served as the bench boss for the Calgary Royals for four years in the mid-1990s. Unfortunately, his return to the AJHL didn't meet with much success and, after four losing seasons, he was out as head coach. Baseotto continued his coaching career as an assistant and worked in that capacity with the Seattle Thunderbirds, Saskatoon Blades and Tri-City Americans. He resigned from his position in 2005 for personal reasons and has yet to return to the game.

== Career statistics ==
			Regular season					Playoffs
Season	Team	League	GP	G	A	Pts	PIM	GP	G	A	Pts	PIM
1977–78	Calgary Canucks	AJHL	60	40	46	86	23	—	—	—	—	—
1978–79	Calgary Canucks	AJHL	59	54	83	137	31	—	7	15	22	—
1979–80	Michigan	WCHA	38	31	45	76	16	—	—	—	—	—
1980–81	Michigan	WCHA	2	1	2	3	0	—	—	—	—	—
1980–81	Calgary Wranglers	WHL	61	55	59	114	66	22	13	14	27	33
1981–82	Flint Generals	IHL	22	6	8	14	9	—	—	—	—	—
1981–82	Fort Wayne Komets	IHL	40	22	23	45	29	9	5	5	10	11
1981–82	New Brunswick Hawks	AHL	2	0	0	0	0	—	—	—	—	—
1982–83	HC Gherdëina	Serie A	32	46	55	101	47	—	—	—	—	—
1983–84	Calgary	CIAU	12	7	12	19	14	—	—	—	—	—
1984–85	HC Bolzano	Serie A	25	43	39	82	37	9	7	8	15	4
1985–86	HC Bolzano	Serie A	36	59	61	120	39	7	12	5	17	6
1986–87	HC Bolzano	Serie A	36	58	33	91	34	—	—	—	—	—
1987–88	HC Bolzano	Serie A	35	36	47	83	22	8	7	10	17	2
1988–89	HC Bolzano	Serie A	46	35	35	70	41	—	—	—	—	—
1989–90	HC Devils Milano	Serie A	46	43	49	92	52	—	—	—	—	—
1990–91	HC Devils Milano	Serie A	34	25	32	57	12	10	6	7	13	6
1991–92	HC Devils Milano	Alpenliga	—	—	—	—	—	2	3	0	3	0
1991–92	HC Devils Milano	Serie A	17	11	9	20	8	11	7	7	14	43
1992–93	HC Devils Milano	Alpenliga	32	9	17	26	8	—	—	—	—	—
1992–93	HC Devils Milano	Serie A	16	15	19	34	12	11	2	3	5	2
Serie A totals			323	371	379	750	294	56	41	40	81	63

=== International ===
Year	Team	Event	GP	G	A	Pts	PIM
1987–88	Italy	International	11	6	7	13	16
1988–89	Italy	International	11	3	1	4	4
1989	Italy	WC	7	2	1	3	2
1989–90	Italy	International	2	1	0	1	0
Totals			31	12	9	21	22

== Coaching Record ==
=== AJHL ===
Team	Year	Regular season						Post season
Team	Year	G	W	L	T	Pts	Finish	Result
Calgary Royals	1993–94	56	26	27	7	(55)	6th	Quarterfinals (0–4)
Calgary Royals	1994–95	56	25	30	1	(51)	T–6th	Quarterfinals (1–4)
Calgary Royals	1995–96	56	23	33	4	(50)	8th	Quarterfinals (1–4)
Calgary Royals	1996–97	60	17	40	3	(37)	11th	no playoffs
Totals		228	91	130	15	—	—	—
