= Mark Taylor (ice hockey, born 1958) =

Canadian ice hockey player

- Born: June 1, 1958 (age 68) Vancouver, British Columbia, Canada
- Height: 6 ft 0 in (183 cm)
- Weight: 190 lb (86 kg; 13 st 8 lb)
- Position: Centre
- Shot: Left
- Played for: Philadelphia Flyers; Pittsburgh Penguins; Washington Capitals
- NHL draft: 100th overall, 1978; Philadelphia Flyers
- Playing career: 1980–1993

Mark C. Taylor (born January 26, 1958) is a Canadian former professional ice hockey player. Taylor played in the National Hockey League (NHL) for the Philadelphia Flyers, Pittsburgh Penguins, and Washington Capitals.

== Career ==
Selected in the sixth round, 100th overall, of the 1978 NHL entry draft by the Philadelphia Flyers, Taylor played college hockey with the North Dakota Fighting Sioux from 1976 to 1980.

During his tenure with the Capitals, Taylor became the second scorer of the franchise's currently record-fastest consecutive goal pair, needing only six seconds to score against the Chicago Black Hawks after a goal scored by Gaétan Duchesne. The Capitals defeated the Black Hawks 4–2.

He is now co-owner of a popular chain of hockey equipment stores bearing his grandfather's name, Cyclone Taylor Sports, based in the Greater Vancouver area.

== Personal life ==
Taylor is the grandson of Hockey Hall of Famer Cyclone Taylor and the nephew of John Russell Taylor.

== Awards and honours ==
Award	Year
All-NCAA All-Tournament Team	1979
All-WCHA First Team	1979–80
AHCA West All-American	1979–80

== Career statistics ==
=== Regular season and playoffs ===
			Regular season					Playoffs
Season	Team	League	GP	G	A	Pts	PIM	GP	G	A	Pts	PIM
1974–75	Langley Lords	BCJHL	—	20	53	73	0	—	—	—	—	—
1975–76	Langley Lords	BCJHL	63	49	79	128	48	—	—	—	—	—
1975–76	Kamloops Chiefs	WCHL	3	0	1	1	0	—	—	—	—	—
1976–77	University of North Dakota	WCHA	38	22	28	50	10	—	—	—	—	—
1977–78	University of North Dakota	WCHA	37	18	22	40	28	—	—	—	—	—
1978–79	University of North Dakota	WCHA	42	24	59	83	28	—	—	—	—	—
1979–80	University of North Dakota	WCHA	40	33	59	92	28	—	—	—	—	—
1980–81	Maine Mariners	AHL	79	19	50	69	56	20	5	16	21	20
1981–82	Philadelphia Flyers	NHL	2	0	0	0	0	—	—	—	—	—
1981–82	Maine Mariners	AHL	75	32	48	80	42	4	2	3	5	4
1982–83	Philadelphia Flyers	NHL	61	8	25	33	24	3	0	0	0	0
1983–84	Philadelphia Flyers	NHL	1	0	0	0	0	—	—	—	—	—
1983–84	Pittsburgh Penguins	NHL	59	24	31	55	24	—	—	—	—	—
1984–85	Pittsburgh Penguins	NHL	47	7	10	17	19	—	—	—	—	—
1984–85	Washington Capitals	NHL	9	1	1	2	2	—	—	—	—	—
1985–86	Washington Capitals	NHL	30	2	1	3	4	3	0	0	0	0
1985–86	Binghamton Whalers	AHL	43	19	38	57	27	—	—	—	—	—
1986–87	Binghamton Whalers	AHL	67	16	37	53	40	13	2	6	8	9
1987–88	EHC Uzwil	NLB	34	24	43	67	33	—	—	—	—	—
1988–89	EHC Uzwil	NLB	36	28	49	77	31	10	11	14	25	4
1989–90	EHC Uzwil	NLB	36	23	33	56	22	10	6	18	24	2
1989–90	Canada	Intl	1	0	0	0	0	—	—	—	—	—
1990–91	SC Herisau	NLB	33	30	49	79	22	2	1	2	3	0
1991–92	HC Bolzano	ITA	1	0	0	0	0	—	—	—	—	—
1991–92	HC Bolzano	ALP	5	1	4	5	0	—	—	—	—	—
1991–92	ECD Sauerland	GER-2	32	23	52	75	28	8	4	19	23	10
1992–93	SC Rapperswil-Jona	NLB	5	4	3	7	0	—	—	—	—	—
NHL totals			209	42	68	110	73	6	0	0	0	0
