= List of Michigan State Spartans men's ice hockey seasons =

This is a season-by-season list of records compiled by Michigan State in men's ice hockey.

The Michigan State Spartans have won three NCAA Championship in their history.

== Season-by-season results ==
Note: GP = Games played, W = Wins, L = Losses, T = Ties

| NCAA D-I Champions | NCAA Frozen Four | Conference regular season champions | Conference Playoff Champions |

| Season | Conference | Regular Season (Note: Code explanation; GP—Games Played, W—Wins, L—Losses, T—Tied games, OTW—Overtime Wins, OTL—Overtime Loses, 3/SW—Win in 3 on 3 overtime or shootout, Pts—Points*) | | | | | | | | | | | | | | Conference Tournament Results | National Tournament Results |
| Season | Conference | Conference | | | | | | | | | Overall | | | | | Conference Tournament Results | National Tournament Results |
| Season | Conference | GP | W | L | T | OTW | OTL | 3/SW | Pts* | Finish | GP | W | L | T | % | Conference Tournament Results | National Tournament Results |
|---|---|---|---|---|---|---|---|---|---|---|---|---|---|---|---|---|---|
No Coach (1921–1922)
| 1921–22 | Independent | – | – | – | – | – | – | – | – | – | 4 | 0 | 4 | 0 | .000 | | |
Program Suspended
John Kobs (1924–1930)
| 1924–25 | Independent | – | – | – | – | – | – | – | – | – | 1 | 0 | 1 | 0 | .000 | | |
| 1925–26 | Independent | – | – | – | – | – | – | – | – | – | 4 | 0 | 4 | 0 | .000 | | |
| 1926–27 | Independent | – | – | – | – | – | – | – | – | – | 4 | 1 | 3 | 0 | .250 | | |
| 1927–28 | Independent | – | – | – | – | – | – | – | – | – | 6 | 3 | 3 | 0 | .500 | | |
| 1928–29 | Independent | – | – | – | – | – | – | – | – | – | 7 | 3 | 3 | 1 | .500 | | |
| 1929–30 | Independent | – | – | – | – | – | – | – | – | – | 5 | 1 | 4 | 0 | .200 | | |
Program Suspended due to lack of available ice
Harold Paulsen (1949–1951)
| 1949–50 | Independent | – | – | – | – | – | – | – | – | – | 14 | 0 | 14 | 0 | .000 | | |
| 1950–51 | Independent | – | – | – | – | – | – | – | – | – | 17 | 6 | 11 | 0 | .353 | | |
Amo Bessone (1951–1979)
| 1951–52 | MCHL | 12 | 3 | 9 | 0 | – | – | – | 6 | 6th | 20 | 7 | 13 | 0 | .350 | | |
| 1952–53 | MCHL | 18 | 2 | 16 | 0 | – | – | – | 2 | 7th | 22 | 5 | 16 | 1 | .250 | | |
| 1953–54 | WIHL | 18 | 4 | 13 | 1 | – | – | – | 6½ | 6th | 23 | 8 | 14 | 1 | .370 | | |
| 1954–55 | WIHL | 20 | 5 | 14 | 1 | – | – | – | 7½ | 7th | 27 | 9 | 17 | 1 | .352 | | |
| 1955–56 | WIHL | 18 | 1 | 17 | 0 | – | – | – | 2 | 7th | 23 | 5 | 18 | 0 | .217 | | |
| 1956–57 | WIHL | 20 | 5 | 15 | 0 | – | – | – | 6 | 7th | 22 | 7 | 15 | 0 | .318 | | |
| 1957–58 | WIHL | 20 | 5 | 15 | 0 | – | – | – | 5 | 7th | 23 | 12 | 11 | 0 | .522 | | |
| 1958–59 | Big Ten | 8 | 5 | 2 | 1 | – | – | – | 11 | 1st | 24 | 17 | 6 | 1 | .729 | | Won Semifinal, 4–3 (OT) (Boston College); Lost Championship, 3–4 (OT) (North Dakota) |
| 1959–60 | Big Ten | 8 | 3 | 5 | 0 | – | – | – | 8 | 3rd | 24 | 4 | 18 | 2 | .208 | | |
| 1959–60 | WCHA | 24 | 4 | 18 | 2 | – | – | – | .208 | 7th | 24 | 4 | 18 | 2 | .208 | | |
| 1960–61 | Big Ten | 8 | 1 | 7 | 0 | – | – | – | 2 | 3rd | 27 | 11 | 16 | 0 | .407 | | |
| 1960–61 | WCHA | 20 | 5 | 15 | 0 | – | – | – | .250 | 6th | 27 | 11 | 16 | 0 | .407 | | |
| 1961–62 | Big Ten | 8 | 3 | 4 | 1 | – | – | – | .438 | 2nd | 25 | 13 | 11 | 1 | .540 | Lost WCHA Semifinal, 1–5 (Michigan Tech) | |
| 1961–62 | WCHA | 16 | 6 | 9 | 1 | – | – | – | .406 | 4th | 25 | 13 | 11 | 1 | .540 | Lost WCHA Semifinal, 1–5 (Michigan Tech) | |
| 1962–63 | Big Ten | 8 | 5 | 3 | 0 | – | – | – | 10 | 2nd | 23 | 11 | 12 | 0 | .478 | | |
| 1962–63 | WCHA | 16 | 6 | 10 | 0 | – | – | – | .375 | T–5th | 23 | 11 | 12 | 0 | .478 | | |
| 1963–64 | Big Ten | 8 | 0 | 8 | 0 | – | – | – | 0 | 3rd | 26 | 8 | 17 | 1 | .327 | | |
| 1963–64 | WCHA | 14 | 1 | 12 | 1 | – | – | – | .107 | 7th | 26 | 8 | 17 | 1 | .327 | | |
University Division
| 1964–65 | Big Ten | 8 | 4 | 4 | 0 | – | – | – | 8 | 2nd | 29 | 17 | 12 | 0 | .586 | Lost WCHA first round series, 7–11 (North Dakota) | |
| 1964–65 | WCHA | 14 | 7 | 7 | 0 | – | – | – | .500 | 4th | 29 | 17 | 12 | 0 | .586 | Lost WCHA first round series, 7–11 (North Dakota) | |
| 1965–66 | Big Ten | 8 | 4 | 4 | 0 | – | – | – | 8 | 2nd | 29 | 16 | 13 | 0 | .552 | Won WCHA first round, 3–2 (Michigan); Won WCHA second round, 4–3 (Michigan Tech) | Won Semifinal, 2–1 (Boston University); Won Championship, 6–1 (Clarkson) |
| 1965–66 | WCHA | 20 | 9 | 11 | 0 | – | – | – | .450 | 6th | 29 | 16 | 13 | 0 | .552 | Won WCHA first round, 3–2 (Michigan); Won WCHA second round, 4–3 (Michigan Tech) | Won Semifinal, 2–1 (Boston University); Won Championship, 6–1 (Clarkson) |
| 1966–67 | Big Ten | 8 | 5 | 3 | 0 | – | – | – | 10 | 1st | 32 | 16 | 15 | 1 | .516 | Won WCHA first round, 4–2 (Michigan); Won WCHA second round, 2–1 (OT) (Michigan Tech) | Lost Semifinal, 2–4 (Boston University); Won Third-place game, 6–1 (North Dakota) |
| 1966–67 | WCHA | 20 | 8 | 11 | 1 | – | – | – | .425 | 5th | 32 | 16 | 15 | 1 | .516 | Won WCHA first round, 4–2 (Michigan); Won WCHA second round, 2–1 (OT) (Michigan Tech) | Lost Semifinal, 2–4 (Boston University); Won Third-place game, 6–1 (North Dakota) |
| 1967–68 | Big Ten | 8 | 2 | 6 | 0 | – | – | – | 4 | 3rd | 29 | 11 | 16 | 2 | .414 | Lost WCHA first round, 2–5 (North Dakota) | |
| 1967–68 | WCHA | 20 | 6 | 13 | 1 | – | – | – | .325 | 6th | 29 | 11 | 16 | 2 | .414 | Lost WCHA first round, 2–5 (North Dakota) | |
| 1968–69 | Big Ten | 10 | 5 | 4 | 1 | – | – | – | .550 | 2nd | 28 | 11 | 16 | 1 | .411 | Lost WCHA first round, 2–4 (Michigan Tech) | |
| 1968–69 | WCHA | 18 | 7 | 10 | 1 | – | – | – | .417 | 6th | 28 | 11 | 16 | 1 | .411 | Lost WCHA first round, 2–4 (Michigan Tech) | |
| 1969–70 | Big Ten | 12 | 5 | 7 | 0 | – | – | – | 10 | T–3rd | 29 | 13 | 16 | 0 | .448 | Lost WCHA regional semifinal, 2–6 (Denver) | |
| 1969–70 | WCHA | 22 | 10 | 12 | 0 | – | – | – | .455 | 7th | 29 | 13 | 16 | 0 | .448 | Lost WCHA regional semifinal, 2–6 (Denver) | |
| 1970–71 | Big Ten | 12 | 8 | 4 | 0 | – | – | – | .667 | 1st | 31 | 19 | 12 | 0 | .613 | Lost WCHA regional semifinal, 3–4 (Minnesota–Duluth) | |
| 1970–71 | WCHA | 22 | 12 | 10 | 0 | – | – | – | .545 | 4th | 31 | 19 | 12 | 0 | .613 | Lost WCHA regional semifinal, 3–4 (Minnesota–Duluth) | |
| 1971–72 | Big Ten | 10 | 5 | 5 | 0 | – | – | – | 10 | T–2nd | 36 | 20 | 16 | 0 | .556 | Won WCHA first round series, 8–4 (Minnesota–Duluth); Lost WCHA second round series, 4–11 (Denver) | |
| 1971–72 | WCHA | 28 | 15 | 13 | 0 | – | – | – | 42 | 4th | 36 | 20 | 16 | 0 | .556 | Won WCHA first round series, 8–4 (Minnesota–Duluth); Lost WCHA second round series, 4–11 (Denver) | |
| 1972–73 | Big Ten | 12 | 8 | 3 | 1 | – | – | – | 17 | T–1st | 36 | 23 | 12 | 1 | .653 | Lost WCHA regional semifinal, 5–8 (Michigan Tech) | |
| 1972–73 | WCHA | 26 | 16 | 10 | 0 | – | – | – | 44 | 4th | 36 | 23 | 12 | 1 | .653 | Lost WCHA regional semifinal, 5–8 (Michigan Tech) | |
Division I
| 1973–74 | Big Ten | 12 | 5 | 6 | 1 | – | – | – | 11 | T–3rd | 38 | 23 | 14 | 1 | .618 | Won WCHA first round series, 7–5 (Wisconsin); Lost WCHA second round series, 10–12 (Michigan Tech) | |
| 1973–74 | WCHA | 28 | 15 | 12 | 1 | – | – | – | 31 | 4th | 38 | 23 | 14 | 1 | .618 | Won WCHA first round series, 7–5 (Wisconsin); Lost WCHA second round series, 10–12 (Michigan Tech) | |
| 1974–75 | Big Ten | 12 | 4 | 8 | 0 | – | – | – | 8 | 4th | 40 | 22 | 17 | 1 | .563 | Won WCHA first round series, 11–9 (Wisconsin); Lost WCHA second round series, 8–15 (Michigan Tech) | |
| 1974–75 | WCHA | 32 | 19 | 12 | 1 | – | – | – | 39 | 5th | 40 | 22 | 17 | 1 | .563 | Won WCHA first round series, 11–9 (Wisconsin); Lost WCHA second round series, 8–15 (Michigan Tech) | |
| 1975–76 | Big Ten | 12 | 9 | 3 | 0 | – | – | – | 18 | 1st | 40 | 23 | 15 | 2 | .600 | Won WCHA first round series, 12–8 (Wisconsin); Lost WCHA second round series, 9–10 (Minnesota) | |
| 1975–76 | WCHA | 32 | 20 | 12 | 0 | – | – | – | 40 | 2nd | 40 | 23 | 15 | 2 | .600 | Won WCHA first round series, 12–8 (Wisconsin); Lost WCHA second round series, 9–10 (Minnesota) | |
| 1976–77 | Big Ten | 12 | 3 | 9 | 0 | – | – | – | 6 | 4th | 36 | 14 | 21 | 1 | .403 | | |
| 1976–77 | WCHA | 32 | 11 | 20 | 1 | – | – | – | 23 | T–8th | 36 | 14 | 21 | 1 | .403 | | |
| 1977–78 | Big Ten | 12 | 2 | 8 | 2 | – | – | – | 6 | 4th | 36 | 7 | 27 | 2 | .222 | | |
| 1977–78 | WCHA | 32 | 7 | 23 | 2 | – | – | – | 16 | 10th | 36 | 7 | 27 | 2 | .222 | | |
| 1978–79 | Big Ten | 12 | 3 | 9 | 0 | – | – | – | 6 | T–3rd | 36 | 15 | 21 | 0 | .417 | | |
| 1978–79 | WCHA | 32 | 12 | 20 | 0 | – | – | – | 24 | T–8th | 36 | 15 | 21 | 0 | .417 | | |
Ron Mason (1979–2002)
| 1979–80 | Big Ten | 12 | 5 | 7 | 0 | – | – | – | 10 | 3rd | 38 | 14 | 24 | 0 | .368 | Lost WCHA first round series, 4–13 (North Dakota) | |
| 1979–80 | WCHA | 30 | 12 | 16 | 0 | – | – | – | .429 | 8th | 38 | 14 | 24 | 0 | .368 | Lost WCHA first round series, 4–13 (North Dakota) | |
| 1980–81 | Big Ten | 8 | 2 | 6 | 0 | – | – | – | .250 | 4th | 36 | 12 | 22 | 2 | .361 | | |
| 1980–81 | WCHA | 28 | 7 | 20 | 1 | – | – | – | 15 | 10th | 36 | 12 | 22 | 2 | .361 | | |
| 1981–82 | CCHA | 28 | 21 | 10 | 1 | – | – | – | 43 | 2nd | 42 | 26 | 14 | 2 | .643 | Won First round series, 12–5 (Lake Superior State); Won Semifinal, 3–2 (Michigan Tech); Won Championship, 4–1 (Notre Dame) | Lost Quarterfinal series, 4–9 (New Hampshire) |
| 1982–83 | CCHA | 32 | 23 | 9 | 0 | – | – | – | 46 | T–2nd | 42 | 30 | 11 | 1 | .726 | Won First round series, 7–6 (Ferris State); Won Semifinal, 8–3 (Ohio State); Won Championship, 4–3 (OT) (Bowling Green) | Lost Quarterfinal series, 8–9 (Harvard) |
| 1983–84 | CCHA | 30 | 21 | 9 | 0 | – | – | – | .700 | T–2nd | 46 | 34 | 12 | 0 | .739 | Won First round series, 8–4 (Michigan Tech); Won Semifinal, 8–1 (Ohio State); Won Championship, 5–0 (Western Michigan) | Won Quarterfinal series, 13–8 (Boston College); Lost Semifinal, 1–2 (Bowling Green); Lost Third-place game, 5–6 (OT) (North Dakota) |
| 1984–85 | CCHA | 32 | 27 | 5 | 0 | – | – | – | 54 | 1st | 44 | 38 | 6 | 0 | .864 | Won First round series, 11–4 (Miami); Won Semifinal, 8–0 (Ohio State); Won Championship, 5–1 (Lake Superior State) | Lost Quarterfinal series, 5–6 (Providence) |
| 1985–86 | CCHA | 32 | 23 | 7 | 2 | – | – | – | 48 | 1st | 45 | 34 | 9 | 2 | .778 | Won First round series, 9–5 (Michigan); Won Semifinal, 3–2 (Lake Superior State); Lost Championship, 1–3 (Western Michigan) | Won Quarterfinal series, 10–6 (Boston College); Won Semifinal, 6–4 (Minnesota); Won Championship, 6–5 (Harvard) |
| 1986–87 | CCHA | 32 | 23 | 8 | 1 | – | – | – | 47 | 2nd | 45 | 33 | 10 | 2 | .756 | Won First round series, 14–10 (Michigan); Won Semifinal, 6–3 (Western Michigan); Won Championship, 4–3 (OT) (Bowling Green) | Won Quarterfinal series, 11–5 (Maine); Won Semifinal, 5–3 (Minnesota); Lost Championship, 3–5 (North Dakota) |
| 1987–88 | CCHA | 32 | 18 | 11 | 3 | – | – | – | 39 | 3rd | 46 | 27 | 16 | 3 | .620 | Won First round series, 2–0 (Illinois–Chicago); Lost Semifinal, 4–6 (Bowling Green); Won Third-place game, 9–6 (Western Michigan) | Won First round series, 11–8 (Harvard); Lost Quarterfinal series, 5–8 (Minnesota) |
| 1988–89 | CCHA | 32 | 25 | 6 | 1 | – | – | – | 51 | 1st | 47 | 37 | 9 | 1 | .798 | Won First round series, 2–0 (Ohio State); Won Semifinal, 3–2 (Bowling Green); Won Championship, 4–1 (Lake Superior State) | Won Quarterfinal series, 2–1 (Boston College); Lost Semifinal, 3–4 (OT) (Harvard); Won Third-place game, 7–4 (Maine) |
| 1989–90 | CCHA | 32 | 26 | 3 | 3 | – | – | – | 55 | 1st | 45 | 35 | 7 | 3 | .811 | Won First round series, 2–0 (Ferris State); Won Semifinal, 4–3 (OT) (Michigan); Won Championship, 4–3 (Lake Superior State) | Lost Quarterfinal series, 2–1 (Boston University) |
| 1990–91 | CCHA | 32 | 14 | 13 | 5 | – | – | – | 33 | 5th | 40 | 17 | 18 | 5 | .488 | Lost Quarterfinal series, 0–2 (Western Michigan) | |
| 1991–92 | CCHA | 32 | 18 | 7 | 7 | – | – | – | 43 | 3rd | 44 | 26 | 10 | 8 | .682 | Won Quarterfinal series, 2–0 (Ferris State); Lost Semifinal, 3–5 (Lake Superior State); Won Colsolation Game, 8–5 (Miami) | Won Regional Quarterfinal, 4–2 (Boston University); Won regional semifinal, 3–2 (Maine); Lost National semifinal, 2–4 (Lake Superior State) |
| 1992–93 | CCHA | 30 | 18 | 10 | 2 | – | – | – | 38 | 4th | 40 | 24 | 14 | 2 | .625 | Won First round series, 2–0 (Kent State); Lost Second round, 2–3 (Ferris State) | |
| 1993–94 | CCHA | 30 | 17 | 8 | 5 | – | – | – | 39 | 3rd | 41 | 23 | 13 | 5 | .622 | Won First round series, 2–1 (Illinois–Chicago); Won Second round, 3–2 (OT) (Bowling Green); Lost Semifinal, 0–4 (Lake Superior State) | Lost Regional Quarterfinal, 3–4 (Massachusetts–Lowell) |
| 1994–95 | CCHA | 27 | 17 | 7 | 3 | – | – | – | 37 | 3rd | 40 | 25 | 12 | 3 | .663 | Won Quarterfinal series, 2–0 (Illinois–Chicago); Won Semifinal, 4–3 (OT) (Bowling Green); Lost Championship, 3–5 (Lake Superior State) | Lost Regional Quarterfinal, 3–5 (Wisconsin) |
| 1995–96 | CCHA | 30 | 22 | 7 | 1 | – | – | – | 45 | T–3rd | 42 | 28 | 13 | 1 | .679 | Won Quarterfinal series, 2–1 (Ferris State); Lost Semifinal, 6–2 (Michigan) | Lost Regional Quarterfinal, 2–6 (Massachusetts–Lowell) |
| 1996–97 | CCHA | 27 | 16 | 7 | 4 | – | – | – | 36 | 3rd | 40 | 23 | 13 | 4 | .625 | Won Quarterfinal series, 2–0 (Western Michigan); Won Semifinal, 4–3 (OT) (Miami); Lost Championship, 1–3 (Michigan) | Lost Regional Quarterfinal, 3–6 (Minnesota) |
| 1997–98 | CCHA | 30 | 21 | 5 | 4 | – | – | – | 46 | 1st | 44 | 33 | 6 | 5 | .807 | Won Quarterfinal series, 2–0 (Ferris State); Won Semifinal, 5–1 (Northern Michigan); Won Championship, 3–2 (2OT) (Ohio State) | Lost Regional semifinal, 3–4 (OT) (Ohio State) |
| 1998–99 | CCHA | 30 | 20 | 3 | 7 | – | – | – | 47 | 1st | 42 | 29 | 6 | 7 | .774 | Won Quarterfinal series, 2–0 (Lake Superior State); Lost Semifinal, 3–5 (Northern Michigan) | Won Regional semifinal, 5–2 (Colorado College); Lost National semifinal, 3–5 (New Hampshire) |
| 1999–00 | CCHA | 28 | 18 | 8 | 2 | – | – | – | 38 | 2nd | 42 | 27 | 11 | 4 | .690 | Won Quarterfinal series, 2–0 (Miami); Won Semifinal, 4–0 (Notre Dame); Won Championship, 6–0 (Nebraska–Omaha) | Lost Regional Quarterfinal, 5–6 (OT) (Boston College) |
| 2000–01 | CCHA | 28 | 21 | 4 | 3 | – | – | – | 45 | 1st | 42 | 33 | 5 | 4 | .833 | Won Quarterfinal series, 2–0 (Alaska–Fairbanks); Won Semifinal, 2–1 (Bowling Green); Won Championship, 2–0 (Michigan) | Won Regional semifinal, 5–1 (Wisconsin); Lost National semifinal, 0–2 (North Dakota) |
| 2001–02 | CCHA | 28 | 18 | 6 | 4 | – | – | – | 40 | 2nd | 41 | 27 | 9 | 5 | .720 | Won First round series, 2–0 (Bowling Green); Won Semifinal, 2–1 (Northern Michigan); Lost Championship, 2–3 (Michigan) | Lost Regional Quarterfinal, 0–2 (Colorado College) |
Rick Comley (2002–2011)
| 2002–03 | CCHA | 28 | 17 | 10 | 1 | – | – | – | 35 | 4th | 39 | 23 | 14 | 2 | .615 | Won First round series, 2–0 (Alaska–Fairbanks); Lost Quarterfinal, 5–7 (Northern Michigan) | |
| 2003–04 | CCHA | 28 | 17 | 9 | 2 | – | – | – | 36 | 3rd | 42 | 23 | 17 | 2 | .571 | Won First round series, 2–0 (Ferris State); Lost Quarterfinal, 1–2 (Northern Michigan) | Lost Regional semifinal, 0–5 (Minnesota–Duluth) |
| 2004–05 | CCHA | 28 | 12 | 13 | 3 | – | – | – | 29 | 6th | 41 | 20 | 17 | 4 | .537 | Won First round series, 2–0 (Miami); Won Quarterfinal, 5–0 (Alaska–Fairbanks); Lost Semifinal, 1–4 (Ohio State); Lost Third-place game, 2–3 (Alaska–Fairbanks) | |
| 2005–06 | CCHA | 28 | 14 | 7 | 7 | – | – | – | 35 | 2nd | 45 | 25 | 12 | 8 | .644 | Won Quarterfinal series, 2–1 (Alaska–Fairbanks); Won Semifinal, 4–1 (Michigan); Won Championship, 2–1 (Miami) | Won Regional semifinal, 1–0 (New Hampshire); Lost Regional Final, 4–5 (Maine) |
| 2006–07 | CCHA | 28 | 15 | 10 | 3 | – | – | – | 33 | 4th | 42 | 26 | 13 | 3 | .655 | Won Quarterfinal series, 2–0 (Nebraska–Omaha); Lost Semifinal, 5–2 (Michigan); Won Third-place game, 7–6 (OT) (Lake Superior State) | Won Regional semifinal, 5–1 (Boston University); Won Regional Final, 2–1 (Notre Dame); Won National semifinal, 4–2 (Maine); Won National Championship, 3–1 (Boston College) |
| 2007–08 | CCHA | 28 | 19 | 6 | 3 | – | – | – | 41 | 3rd | 42 | 25 | 12 | 5 | .655 | Lost Quarterfinal series, 1–2 (Northern Michigan) | Won Regional semifinal, 3–1 (Colorado College); Lost Regional Final, 1–3 (Notre Dame) |
| 2008–09 | CCHA | 28 | 7 | 17 | 4 | – | – | 3 | 21 | T–10th | 38 | 10 | 23 | 5 | .329 | Lost First round series, 0–2 (Northern Michigan) | |
| 2009–10 | CCHA | 28 | 14 | 8 | 6 | – | – | 2 | 50 | 2nd | 38 | 19 | 13 | 6 | .579 | Lost First round series, 0–2 (Michigan) | |
| 2010–11 | CCHA | 28 | 11 | 15 | 2 | – | – | 0 | 35 | 11th | 38 | 15 | 19 | 4 | .447 | Lost Quarterfinal series, 0–2 (Alaska) | |
Tom Anastos (2011–2017)
| 2011–12 | CCHA | 28 | 14 | 11 | 3 | – | – | 2 | 47 | 5th | 39 | 19 | 16 | 4 | .538 | Lost Quarterfinal series, 0–2 (Miami) | Lost Regional semifinal, 1-3 (Union) |
| 2012–13 | CCHA | 28 | 9 | 18 | 1 | – | – | 0 | 28 | 11th | 42 | 14 | 25 | 3 | .369 | Won First round series, 2–1 (Alaska); Lost Quarterfinal series, 1–2 (Miami) | |
| 2013–14 | Big Ten | 20 | 5 | 9 | 6 | – | – | 4 | 25 | 5th | 36 | 11 | 18 | 7 | .403 | Lost Quarterfinal, 1–2 (OT) (Ohio State) | |
| 2014–15 | Big Ten | 20 | 11 | 7 | 2 | – | – | 2 | 37 | 2nd | 35 | 17 | 16 | 2 | .514 | Lost Semifinal, 5–1 (Michigan) | |
| 2015–16 | Big Ten | 20 | 6 | 12 | 2 | – | – | 0 | 21 | 5th | 37 | 10 | 23 | 4 | .324 | Lost Quarterfinal, 3–4 (OT) (Ohio State) | |
| 2016–17 | Big Ten | 20 | 3 | 14 | 3 | – | – | 0 | 13 | 6th | 35 | 7 | 24 | 4 | .257 | Lost Quarterfinal, 3–6 (Ohio State) | |
Danton Cole (2017–2022)
| 2017–18 | Big Ten | 24 | 6 | 16 | 2 | – | – | 1 | 21 | 7th | 36 | 12 | 22 | 2 | .361 | Lost Quarterfinal series, 0–2 (Ohio State) | |
| 2018–19 | Big Ten | 24 | 8 | 12 | 4 | – | – | 2 | 30 | 7th | 36 | 12 | 19 | 5 | .403 | Lost Quarterfinal series, 0–2 (Notre Dame) | |
| 2019–20 | Big Ten | 24 | 11 | 11 | 2 | – | – | 2 | 35 | 6th | 36 | 15 | 19 | 2 | .444 | Lost Quarterfinal series, 0–2 (Michigan) | |
| 2020–21 | Big Ten | 22 | 5 | 16 | 1 | 2 | 0 | 0 | .250 | 7th | 27 | 7 | 18 | 2 | .296 | Lost Quarterfinal, 1–2 (OT) (Minnesota) | |
| 2021–22 | Big Ten | 22 | 6 | 18 | 0 | 1 | 0 | 0 | 17 | 7th | 36 | 12 | 23 | 1 | .347 | Lost Quarterfinal series, 0–2 (Michigan) | |
Adam Nightingale (2022–Present)
| 2022–23 | Big Ten | 22 | 10 | 12 | 2 | 1 | 1 | 2 | 34 | T–5th | 38 | 18 | 18 | 2 | .500 | Won Quarterfinal series, 2–1 (Notre Dame); Lost Semifinal, 1–5 (Minnesota) | |
| 2023–24 | Big Ten | 24 | 16 | 6 | 2 | 0 | 1 | 1 | 52 | 1st | 38 | 25 | 10 | 3 | .697 | Won Semifinal, 2–1 (Ohio State); Won Championship, 5–4 (OT) (Michigan) | Won Regional Semifinal, 5–4 (OT) (Western Michigan); Lost Regional Final, 2–5 (Michigan) |
| 2024–25 | Big Ten | 24 | 15 | 5 | 4 | 2 | 1 | 2 | 50 | T–1st | 37 | 26 | 7 | 4 | .757 | Won Semifinal, 1–0 (Notre Dame); Won Championship, 4–3 (2OT) (Ohio State) | Lost Regional Semifinal, 3–4 (Cornell) |
| 2025–26 | Big Ten | 24 | 16 | 6 | 2 | 2 | 2 | 1 | 51 | 1st | 37 | 26 | 9 | 2 | .730 | Lost Semifinal, 2–3 (OT) (Ohio State) | Won Regional Semifinal, 2–1 (UConn); Lost Regional Final, 3–4 (OT) (Wisconsin) |
| Totals | | | | | | | | | | | GP | W | L | T | % | Championships | |
| Regular Season | | | | | | | | | | | 2528 | 1300 | 1054 | 174 | .549 | 8 Big Ten Championships, 7 CCHA Championships | |
| Conference Post-season | | | | | | | | | | | 172 | 103 | 68 | 1 | .602 | 2 WCHA tournament championships, 12 CCHA tournament championships, 2 Big Ten tournament championships | |
| NCAA Post-season | | | | | | | | | | | 65 | 32 | 32 | 1 | .500 | 29 NCAA Tournament appearances | |
| Regular Season and Post-season Record | | | | | | | | | | | 2765 | 1435 | 1154 | 176 | .551 | 3 NCAA Division I National Championships | |

* Winning percentage is used when conference schedules are unbalanced.
