= List of Western Michigan Broncos men's ice hockey seasons =

This is a list of seasons completed by the Western Michigan University Broncos men's ice hockey team.

NAIA/NCAA D-I Champions	NAIA/NCAA Frozen Four	Conference regular season champions	Conference Playoff Champions

Season	Conference	Regular Season (Note: Code explanation; GP—Games Played, W—Wins, L—Losses, T—Tied games, OTW—Overtime Wins, OTL—Overtime Loses, 3/SW—Win in 3 on 3 overtime or shootout, Pts—Points*)														Conference Tournament Results	National Tournament Results
Season	Conference	Conference									Overall					Conference Tournament Results	National Tournament Results
Season	Conference	GP	W	L	T	OTW	OTL	3/SW	Pts*	Finish	GP	W	L	T	%	Conference Tournament Results	National Tournament Results
Division II
Bill Neal (1973–1978)
1973–74	-	8	5	2	1	-	-	-	11	1st	30	22	7	1	.750	Lost CCHA Semifinal, 2–6 (Lake Superior State)	
Division I
1974–75	-	8	8	0	0	-	-	-	16	1st	27	19	8	0	.704	Lost CCHA Semifinal, 2–5 (Saint Louis)	
1975–76	CCHA	16	6	10	0	-	-	-	12	4th	34	18	14	2	.559	Won Semifinal, 3–2 (OT) (Bowling Green); Lost Championship series, 4–15 (Saint Louis)	
1976–77	CCHA	16	5	11	0	-	-	-	10	4th	37	17	19	1	.473	Lost Semifinal series, 6–14 (Saint Louis)	
1977–78	CCHA	20	7	12	1	-	-	-	15	T–5th	33	15	17	1	.470		
Glen Weller (1978–1982)
1978–79	CCHA	24	8	16	0	-	-	-	16	6th	36	17	19	0	.472		
1979–80	CCHA	20	6	13	1	-	-	-	13	5th	36	18	16	2	.528		
1980–81	CCHA	22	8	13	1	-	-	-	17	5th	36	15	19	2	.444		
1981–82	CCHA	30	11	18	1	-	-	-	23	9th	34	14	19	1	.426		
Bill Wilkinson (1982–1999)
1982–83	CCHA	32	10	20	2	-	-	-	22	T–9th	36	11	23	2	.333		
1983–84	CCHA	28	13	14	1	-	-	-	.482	5th	42	22	18	2	.548	Won Quarterfinal series, 7–6 (Northern Michigan); Won Semifinal, 4–3 (2OT) (Bowling Green); Lost Championship, 0–5 (Michigan State)	
1984–85	CCHA	32	18	13	1	-	-	-	37	3rd	40	22	16	2	.575	Lost Quarterfinal series, 7–8 (Ohio State)	
1985–86	CCHA	32	23	9	0	-	-	-	46	T–2nd	44	32	12	0	.727	Won Quarterfinal series, 16–5 (Ferris State); Won Semifinal, 4–3 (OT) (Bowling Green); Won Championship, 3–1 (Michigan State)	Lost Quarterfinal series, 4–11 (Harvard)
1986–87	CCHA	32	16	16	0	-	-	-	32	5th	43	23	20	0	.535	Won Quarterfinal series, 2–1 (Illinois–Chicago); Lost Semifinal, 3–6 (Michigan State); Lost Consolation Game, 4–7 (Ohio State)	
1987–88	CCHA	32	16	12	3	-	-	-	37	4th	42	22	17	3	.560	Won Quarterfinal series, 2–1 (Michigan); Lost Semifinal, 4–5 (OT) (Lake Superior State); Lost Consolation Game, 6–9 (Michigan State)	
1988–89	CCHA	32	9	17	6	-	-	-	24	6th	43	14	23	6	.395	Lost Quarterfinal series, 1–2 (Illinois–Chicago)	
1989–90	CCHA	32	12	18	2	-	-	-	26	T–5th	40	14	24	2	.375	Lost Quarterfinal series, 0–2 (Michigan)	
1990–91	CCHA	32	16	14	2	-	-	-	34	4th	42	22	17	3	.560	Won Quarterfinal series, 2–0 (Michigan State); Lost Semifinal, 4–11 (Lake Superior State); Won Consolation Game, 2–1 (OT) (Ferris State)	
1991–92	CCHA	32	14	12	6	-	-	-	34	4th	36	16	14	6	.528	Lost Quarterfinal series, 0–2 (Miami)	
1992–93	CCHA	30	17	11	2	-	-	-	36	5th	38	20	16	2	.553	Lost First round series, 0–2 (Bowling Green)	
1993–94	CCHA	30	18	10	2	-	-	-	38	4th	40	24	13	3	.638	Won First round series, 2–0 (Notre Dame); Won Second round, 4–3 (Miami); Lost Semifinal, 4–6 (Michigan)	Lost Regional Quarterfinal, 3–6 (Wisconsin)
1994–95	CCHA	27	9	14	4	-	-	-	22	T–6th	40	17	18	5	.488	Lost Quarterfinal series, 0–2 (Lake Superior State)	
1995–96	CCHA	30	21	6	3	-	-	-	45	T–3rd	41	27	11	3	.695	Lost Quarterfinal series, 0–2 (Bowling Green)	Lost Regional Quarterfinal, 1–6 (Clarkson)
1996–97	CCHA	27	10	12	5	-	-	-	25	T–5th	37	14	18	5	.446	Lost Quarterfinal series, 0–2 (Michigan State)	
1997–98	CCHA	30	9	19	2	-	-	-	20	9th	38	10	25	3	.303		
Jim Culhane (1999–2010)
1998–99	CCHA	30	5	17	8	-	-	-	18	10th	34†	6†	20†	8†	.294†		
1999–00	CCHA	28	10	15	3	-	-	-	23	T–9th	36	12	21	3	.375	Lost Quarterfinal series, 0–2 (Michigan)	
2000–01	CCHA	28	12	10	6	-	-	-	30	T–5th	39	20	13	6	.590	Lost Quarterfinal series, 1–2 (Northern Michigan)	
2001–02	CCHA	28	13	12	3	-	-	-	29	6th	38	19	15	4	.553	Lost First round series, 0–2 (Ohio State)	
2002–03	CCHA	28	13	14	1	-	-	-	27	T–8th	38	15	21	2	.421	Lost First round series, 0–2 (Northern Michigan)	
2003–04	CCHA	28	12	13	3	-	-	-	27	8th	39	17	18	4	.487	Lost First round series, 1–2 (Notre Dame)	
2004–05	CCHA	28	8	18	2	-	-	-	18	T–10th	37	14	21	2	.405	Lost First round series, 1–2 (Northern Michigan)	
2005–06	CCHA	28	7	16	5	-	-	-	19	11th	40	10	24	6	.325	Won First round series, 2–0 (Lake Superior State); Lost Quarterfinal series, 0–2 (Miami)	
2006–07	CCHA	28	14	13	1	-	-	-	29	6th	37	18	18	1	.500	Lost CCHA first round series, 2–1 (Alaska)	
2007–08	CCHA	28	4	22	2	-	-	-	10	12th	38	8	27	3	.250	Lost CCHA first round series, 0–2 (Ferris State)	
2008–09	CCHA	28	9	13	6	-	-	2	26	T–7th	41	14	20	7	.427	Won First round series, 2–1 (Lake Superior State); Lost Quarterfinal series, 0–2 (Michigan)	
2009–10	CCHA	28	4	17	7	-	-	2	21	12th	36	8	20	8	.333	Lost First round series, 0–2 (Alaska)	
Jeff Blashill (2010–2011)
2010–11	CCHA	28	10	9	9	-	-	5	44	4th	42	19	13	10	.571	Won Quarterfinal series, 2–1 (Ferris State); Won Semifinal, 5–2 (Michigan); Lost Championship, 2–5 (Miami)	Lost Regional Quarterfinal, 2–3 (2OT) (Denver)
Andy Murray (2011–2021)
2011–12	CCHA	28	14	10	4	-	-	4	50	T–3rd	41	21	14	6	.585	Won Quarterfinal series, 2–0 (Lake Superior State); Won Semifinal, 6–2 (Miami); Won Championship, 3–2 (Michigan)	Lost Regional Quarterfinal, 1–4 (North Dakota)
2012–13	CCHA	28	15	7	6	-	-	3	54	3rd	38	19	11	8	.605	Lost Quarterfinal series, 0–2 (Michigan)	
2013–14	NCHC	28	11	11	2	-	-	2	37	T-4th	40	19	16	5	.538	Won Quarterfinal series, 2–0 (Minnesota–Duluth); Lost Semifinal, 3–4 (Denver); Lost Third-place game, 0–5 (North Dakota)	
2014–15	NCHC	28	6	13	5	-	-	4	27	7th	37	14	18	5	.446	Lost Quarterfinal series, 1–2 (Miami)	
2015–16	NCHC	28	5	18	1	-	-	1	17	7th	36	8	25	3	.264	Lost Quarterfinal series, 0–2 (St. Cloud State)	
2016–17	NCHC	28	13	9	2	-	-	1	42	3rd	40	22	13	5	.613	Won Quarterfinal series, 2–1 (Omaha); Lost Semifinal, 2–5 (Minnesota–Duluth); Lost Third-place game, 1–3 (Denver)	Lost Regional Quarterfinal, 4–5 (Air Force)
2017–18	NCHC	28	10	13	1	-	-	0	31	T–5th	36	15	19	2	.444	Lost Quarterfinal series, 0–2 (Minnesota–Duluth)	
2018–19	NCHC	28	13	10	1	-	-	1	41	3rd	37	21	15	1	.581	Lost Quarterfinal series, 1–2 (Colorado College)	
2019–20	NCHC	28	12	9	3	-	-	2	41	4th	36	18	13	5	.569	Tournament Cancelled	
2020–21	NCHC	24	10	11	3	1	0	1	.458	6th	25	10	12	3	.460	Lost Quarterfinal, 4–5 (OT) (Minnesota Duluth)	
Pat Ferschweiler (2021–Present)
2021–22	NCHC	24	14	9	1	1	0	1	43	3rd	39	26	12	1	.679	Won Quarterfinal series, 2–0 (Omaha); Won Semifinal, 4–2 (North Dakota); Lost Championship Game, 0–3 (Minnesota Duluth)	Won Regional semifinal, 2–1 (OT) (Northeastern); Lost Regional Final, 0–3 (Minnesota)
2022–23	NCHC	24	15	8	1	0	0	0	44	2nd	39	23	15	1	.603	Lost Quarterfinal series, 0–2 (Colorado College)	Lost Regional semifinal, 1–5 (Boston University)
2023–24	NCHC	24	11	13	0	1	5	0	35	6th	38	21	16	1	.566	Lost Quarterfinal series, 1–2 (St. Cloud State)	Lost Regional semifinal, 4–5 (OT) (Michigan State)
2024–25	NCHC	24	19	4	1	7	3	0	57	1st	42	34	7	1	.821	Won Quarterfinal series, 2–0 (St. Cloud State); Won Semifinal, 4–2 (North Dakota); Won Championship, 4–3 (2OT) (Denver)	Won Regional Semifinal, 2–1 (2OT) (Minnesota State); Won Regional Final, 2–1 (Massachusetts); Won National Semifinal, 3–2 (2OT) (Denver); Won National Championship, 6–2 (Boston University)
Totals											GP	W	L	T	%	Championships	
Regular Season											1816	863	797	166	.518		
Conference Post-season											126	48	76	2	.369	2 CCHA tournament championships, 1 NCHC tournament championship	
NCAA Post-season											15	5	10	0	.333	10 NCAA Tournament appearances	
Regular Season and Post-season Record											1964	916	880	168	.509	1 NCAA National Championship	

* Winning percentage is used when conference schedules are unbalanced.
† Bill Wilkinson was fired as coach in February 1999 due to NCAA violations regarding player compensation.
