= List of Notre Dame Fighting Irish men's ice hockey seasons =

This is a season-by-season list of records compiled by Notre Dame in men's ice hockey.

== Season-by-season results ==
Note: GP = Games played, W = Wins, L = Losses, T = Ties

NCAA D-I Champions	NCAA Frozen Four	Conference regular season champions	Conference Playoff Champions

Season	Conference	Regular season (Note: Code explanation; GP—Games Played, W—Wins, L—Losses, T—Tied games, OTW—Overtime Wins, OTL—Overtime Loses, 3/SW—Win in 3 on 3 overtime or shootout, Pts—Points*)														Conference Tournament Results	National Tournament Results
Season	Conference	Conference									Overall					Conference Tournament Results	National Tournament Results
Season	Conference	GP	W	L	T	OTW	OTL	3/SW	Pts*	Finish	GP	W	L	T	%	Conference Tournament Results	National Tournament Results
No Head Coach (1911–1912)
1911–12	Independent	–	–	–	–	–	–	–	–	–	1	1	0	0	1.000		
G. R. Walsh (1912–1913)
1912–13	Independent	–	–	–	–	–	–	–	–	–	3	1	2	0	.333		
Program Suspended
Paul Castner (1919–1923)
1919–20	Independent	–	–	–	–	–	–	–	–	–	2	2	0	0	1.000		
1920–21	Independent	–	–	–	–	–	–	–	–	–	2	2	1	0	.667		
1921–22	Independent	–	–	–	–	–	–	–	–	–	11	8	2	1	.773		
1922–23	Independent	–	–	–	–	–	–	–	–	–	9	7	2	0	.778		
Tom Lieb (1923–1926)
1923–24	Independent	–	–	–	–	–	–	–	–	–	5	0	5	0	.000		
1924–25	Independent	–	–	–	–	–	–	–	–	–	4	0	2	2	.250		
1925–26	Independent	–	–	–	–	–	–	–	–	–	6	3	2	1	.583		
Benjamin Dubois (1926–1927)
1926–27	Independent	–	–	–	–	–	–	–	–	–	11	3	7	1	.318		
Program Suspended
Lefty Smith (1968–1987)
1968–69	Independent	–	–	–	–	–	–	–	–	–	27	16	8	3	.648		
1969–70	Independent	–	–	–	–	–	–	–	–	–	30	21	8	1	.717		
1970–71	Independent	–	–	–	–	–	–	–	–	–	31	13	16	2	.452		
1971–72	WCHA	26	10	16	0	–	–	–	28	T–8th	34	14	20	0	.412	Lost First round series, 4–11 (Denver)	
1972–73	WCHA	26	19	9	0	–	–	–	48	2nd	38	23	14	1	.618	Won First round series, 13–3 (North Dakota); Lost Second Round series, 7–8 (Wisconsin)	
Division I
1973–74	WCHA	28	11	16	1	–	–	–	23	8th	36	14	20	2	.417	Lost First round series, 4–6 (Michigan Tech)	
1974–75	WCHA	32	10	19	3	–	–	–	23	7th	38	13	22	3	.378	Lost First round series, 3–8 (Michigan TechState)	
1975–76	WCHA	32	15	15	2	–	–	–	32	5th	38	19	17	2	.791	Lost First round series, 8–12 (Michigan)	
1976–77	WCHA	32	19	10	3	–	–	–	41	2nd	38	22	13	3	.618	Lost First round series, 7–10 (Minnesota)	
1977–78	WCHA	32	12	19	1	–	–	–	25	T–7th	38	12	24	2	.342	Lost First round series, 7–13 (Denver)	
1978–79	WCHA	32	17	14	1	–	–	–	35	5th	38	18	19	1	.487	Lost First round series, 10–16 (Wisconsin)	
1979–80	WCHA	28	13	14	1	–	–	–	.482	5th	39	18	20	1	.474	Won First round series, 11–7 (Michigan); Lost Second Round series, 8–17 (North Dakota)	
1980–81	WCHA	28	9	18	1	–	–	–	19	9th	36	13	21	2	.389		
1981–82	CCHA	30	15	13	2	–	–	–	32	T–4th	40	23	15	3	.600	Won Quarterfinal series, 11–8 (Michigan); Won Semifinal, 8–5 (Bowling Green); Lost Championship, 1–4 (Michigan State)	
1982–83	CCHA	32	13	17	2	–	–	–	28	8th	36	13	21	2	.389	Lost Quarterfinal series, 5–15 (Bowling Green)	
Program Downgraded to Club Status for 1983–84 season
1984–85	Independent	–	–	–	–	–	–	–	–	–	28	11	16	1	.411		
1985–86	Independent	–	–	–	–	–	–	–	–	–	34	12	21	1	.368		
1986–87	ACHA	12	4	7	1	–	–	–	9	3rd	30	10	19	1	.350	Won Semifinal, 4–1 (Lake Forest); Lost Championship, 2–5 (Michigan–Dearborn)	
Ric Schafer (1987–1995)
1987–88	ACHA	12	7	3	2	–	–	–	16	2nd	33	27	4	2	.848	Won Semifinal, 5–3 (Lake Forest); Won Championship, 5–2 (Michigan–Dearborn)	
1988–89	ACHA	11	3	7	1	–	–	–	.318	2nd	38	10	26	2	.289		
1989–90	Independent	–	–	–	–	–	–	–	–	–	33	18	15	0	.537		
1990–91	Independent	–	–	–	–	–	–	–	–	–	33	16	15	2	.515		
1991–92	Independent	–	–	–	–	–	–	–	–	–	31	12	18	1	.403		
1992–93	CCHA	30	5	23	2	–	–	–	12	10th	36	7	27	2	.222	Lost First round series, 0–2 (Michigan)	
1993–94	CCHA	30	9	16	5	–	–	–	23	8th	38	11	22	5	.355	Lost First round series, 0–2 (Western Michigan)	
1994–95	CCHA	27	7	19	1	–	–	–	15	9th	37	11	25	1	.311	Lost Quarterfinal series, 0–2 (Bowling Green)	
Dave Poulin (1995–2005)
1995–96	CCHA	30	6	20	4	–	–	–	16	10th	36	9	23	4	.306		
1996–97	CCHA	27	6	20	1	–	–	–	13	10th	35	9	25	1	.271		
1997–98	CCHA	30	12	14	4	–	–	–	28	T–6th	41	18	19	4	.488	Lost Quarterfinal series, 1–2 (Michigan)	
1998–99	CCHA	30	15	11	4	–	–	–	34	4th	38	19	14	5	.566	Lost Quarterfinal series, 1–2 (Northern Michigan)	
1999–00	CCHA	28	11	10	7	–	–	–	29	5th	42	16	18	8	.476	Won First round series, 2–1 (Ferris State); Lost Semifinal, 0–4 (Michigan State)	
2000–01	CCHA	28	7	15	6	–	–	–	20	11th	39	10	22	7	.346		
2001–02	CCHA	28	12	12	4	–	–	–	28	T–7th	38	16	17	5	.487	Won First round series, 2–1 (Nebraska–Omaha); Lost Quarterfinal, 1–3 (Northern Michigan)	
2002–03	CCHA	28	13	2	3	–	–	–	29	T–6th	40	17	17	6	.500	Won First round series, 2–1 (Miami); Lost Quarterfinal, 2–3 (Ohio State)	
2003–04	CCHA	28	14	11	3	–	–	–	31	5th	39	20	15	4	.564	Won First round series, 2–1 (Western Michigan); Lost Quarterfinal, 5–6 (OT) (Ohio State)	Lost Regional semifinal, 2–5 (Minnesota)
2004–05	CCHA	28	3	20	5	–	–	–	11	12th	38	5	27	6	.211	Lost First round series, 0–2 (Michigan)	
Jeff Jackson (2005–2025)
2005–06	CCHA	28	11	13	4	–	–	–	26	T–8th	36	13	19	4	.417	Lost Quarterfinal series, 2–0 (Alaska–Fairbanks)	
2006–07	CCHA	28	21	4	3	–	–	–	45	1st	42	32	7	3	.798	Won Quarterfinal series, 2–0 (Alaska); Won Semifinal, 3–0 (Lake Superior State); Won Championship, 2–1 (Michigan)	Won Regional semifinal, 3–2 (2OT) (Alabama–Huntsville); Lost Regional final, 1–2 (Michigan State)
2007–08	CCHA	28	15	9	4	–	–	–	34	4th	47	27	16	4	.617	Won Quarterfinal series, 2–1 (Ferris State); Lost Semifinal, 1–2 (OT) (Miami); Lost Third-place game, 1–2 (Northern Michigan)	Won Regional semifinal, 7–3 (New Hampshire); Won Regional final, 3–1 (Michigan State); Won National semifinal, 5–4 (OT) (Michigan); Lost National Championship, 1–4 (Boston College)
2008–09	CCHA	28	21	4	3	–	–	3	48	1st	40	31	6	3	.813	Won Quarterfinal series, 2–0 (Nebraska–Omaha); Won Semifinal, 2–1 (Northern Michigan); Won Championship, 5–2 (Michigan)	Lost Regional semifinal, 1–5 (Bemidji State)
2009–10	CCHA	28	9	12	7	–	–	2	36	9th	38	13	17	8	.447	Lost First round series, 0–2 (Ohio State)	
2010–11	CCHA	28	18	7	3	–	–	2	59	2nd	44	25	14	5	.625	Won Quarterfinal series, 2–1 (Lake Superior State); Lost Semifinal, 2–6 (Miami); Lost Third-place game, 2–4 (Michigan)	Won Regional semifinal, 4–3 (OT) (Merrimack); Won Regional final, 2–1 (New Hampshire); Lost National semifinal, 3–4 (Minnesota–Duluth)
2011–12	CCHA	28	12	13	3	–	–	0	39	T–8th	40	19	18	3	.513	Won First round series, 2–0 (Ohio State); Lost Quarterfinal series, 0–2 (Michigan)	
2012–13	CCHA	28	17	8	3	–	–	2	56	2nd	41	25	13	3	.646	Won Quarterfinal series, 2–0 (Bowling Green); Won Semifinal, 3–1 (Ohio State); Won Championship, 3–1 (Michigan)	Lost Regional semifinal, 1–5 (St. Cloud State)
2013–14	Hockey East	20	9	9	2	–	–	–	20	T–7th	40	23	15	2	.600	Won Opening Round, 3–2 (Boston University); Won Quarterfinal Series, 2–1 (Boston College); Lost Semifinal, 2–4 (Massachusetts–Lowell)	Lost Regional semifinal, 3–4 (OT) (St. Cloud State)
2014–15	Hockey East	22	10	7	5	–	–	–	25	5th	42	18	19	5	.488	Won Opening Round series, 2–1 (Massachusetts); Lost Quarterfinal series, 1–2 (Massachusetts–Lowell)	
2015–16	Hockey East	22	12	6	4	–	–	–	32	3rd	37	19	11	7	.608	Lost Semifinal, 0–2 (Northeastern)	Lost Regional semifinal, 2–3 (OT) (Michigan)
2016–17	Hockey East	22	12	6	4	–	–	–	28	4th	40	23	12	5	.638	Won Quarterfinal series, 2–0 (Providence); Lost Semifinal, 1–5 (Massachusetts–Lowell)	Won Regional semifinal, 3–2 (Minnesota); Won Regional final, 3–2 (OT) (Massachusetts–Lowell); Lost National semifinal, 1–6 (Denver)
2017–18	Big Ten	24	17	6	1	–	–	1	53	1st	40	28	10	2	.725	Won Semifinal, 3–2 (Penn State); Won Championship, 3–2 (OT) (Ohio State)	Won Regional semifinal, 4–3 (OT) (Michigan Tech); Won Regional final, 2–1 (Providence); Won National semifinal, 4–3 (Michigan); Lost National Championship, 1–2 (Minnesota–Duluth)
2018–19	Big Ten	24	11	11	2	–	–	2	37	2nd	40	23	14	3	.613	Won Quarterfinal series, 2–0 (Michigan State); Won Semifinal, 2–1 (OT) (Minnesota); Won Championship, 3–2 (Penn State)	Won Regional semifinal, 3–2 (OT) (Clarkson); Lost Regional final, 0–4 (Massachusetts)
2019–20	Big Ten	24	9	9	6	–	–	4	37	5th	37	15	15	7	.500	Lost Quarterfinal series, 1–2 (Minnesota)	
2020–21	Big Ten	24	12	10	2	1	2	2	.542	4th	29	14	13	2	.517	Lost Quarterfinal, 3–6 (Penn State)	Regional semifinal, no contest (Boston College)
2021–22	Big Ten	24	17	7	0	5	1	0	47	3rd	40	28	12	0	.700	Won Quarterfinal series, 2–1 (Wisconsin); Lost Semifinal, 1–2 (Michigan)	Won Regional semifinal, 2–1 (OT) (North Dakota); Lost Regional final, 0–1 (Minnesota State)
2022–23	Big Ten	24	10	10	4	2	0	3	35	4th	37	16	16	5	.500	Lost Quarterfinal series, 1–2 (Michigan State)	
2023–24	Big Ten	24	9	13	2	0	1	1	31	5th	36	15	19	2	.444	Lost Quarterfinal series, 0–2 (Michigan)	
2024–25	Big Ten	24	4	19	1	2	2	1	14	7th	38	12	25	1	.329	Won Quarterfinal series, 2–1 (Minnesota); Lost Semifinal, 0–1 (Michigan State)	
Brock Sheahan (2025–Present)
Totals											GP	W	L	T	%	Championships	
Regular season											1981	913	898	170	.504	2 CCHA Championships, 1 Big Ten Championship	
Conference Post-season											127	56	67	4	.457	1 ACHA tournament championship, 3 CCHA tournament championships, 2 Big Ten tournament championships	
NCAA Post-season											25	13	12	0	.520	11 NCAA Tournament appearances	
Regular season and Post-season Record											2133	982	977	174	.501		

* Winning percentage is used when conference schedules are unbalanced.
