= Tom Viggiano =

Biographical details
- Born: Warren, Michigan
- Education: Kent State University

Playing career
- 1979–1980: Redford Royals
- 1980–1984: Kent State

Coaching career (HC unless noted)
- 1987–1988: Kent State

Head coaching record
- Overall: 11–26–3 (.313)

Tom Viggiano is an American former ice hockey player and head coach who previously headed the program at Kent State.

== Career ==
Tom Viggiano was named as the interim head coach for Kent State when John Wallin resigned in the summer of 1987. After a poor showing Kent declined to remove his interim tag and began to search for a full-time replacement. While Viggiano was considered for the position it ultimately went to Bill Switaj.

== Head coaching record ==
=== College ===
Record table
Season	Team	Overall	Conference	Standing	Postseason
Kent State Golden Flashes (ACHA) (1987–1988)
1987–88	Kent State	11–26–3	0–10–2	4th	
Kent State:		11–26–3 (.313)	0–10–2 (.083)		
Total:		11–26–3 (.313)			
National champion Postseason invitational champion Conference regular season champion Conference regular season and conference tournament champion Division regular season champion Division regular season and conference tournament champion Conference tournament champion
