= Ric Schafer =

American ice hockey player and coach

Biographical details
- Born: 1951; New Brighton, Minnesota
- Education: University of Notre Dame

Playing career
- 1970–1974: Notre Dame
- Position: Center

Coaching career (HC unless noted)
- 1975–1980: Notre Dame (assistant)
- 1980–1987: Alaska-Fairbanks
- 1987–1995: Notre Dame

Head coaching record
- Overall: 213–237–17 (.474)

Ric Schafer (born 1951) is a retired American ice hockey player and head coach best remembered for his time with the men's program at Notre Dame.

== Career ==
Schafer was one of many Minnesota players brought to South Bend under Lefty Smith. When he started play for the Fighting Irish the NCAA had just removed its restriction on freshman playing for varsity teams which allowed Schafer to earn four letters with the team as well as serve as team captain his senior season.

After graduating Schafer returned to Notre Dame as an assistant in 1975 and worked in that capacity until 1980. At the same time that Notre Dame was experiencing a budgetary issue with its program Alaska-Fairbanks was elevating its club to Division I status and they chose Schafer to be their new head coach.

At the start Alaska-Fairbanks was a bad team. Schafer was only able to guide them to one win at the top level their first season and four more the following campaign. By the third year, however, the team turned their fortunes around and produced a 19-7 record. The Nanooks posted two consecutive 20+ win seasons in the mid-1980s before the team joined its first conference, the Great West Hockey Conference. Schafer got his team a second place finish the first year of conference play but was unable to improve on that mark before his former coach Lefty Smith retired and he accepted the head coaching post at his alma mater.

When Schafer took over Notre Dame's program in 1987 the team was in turmoil, having drastically slashed its recruiting budget and eliminated all hockey scholarships. While technically a Division I Independent at the time Notre Dame was playing against mostly Division III teams which was the main cause for its 27-4-2 record and ACHA Tournament Championship in Schafer's first year with the team. The team's fortunes declined when the ACHA collapsed the following year but Schafer was able to hold the program together through the rough patch.

By 1992 enough interest in the team had been generated to warrant the administration returning some scholarships to the program and Notre Dame was readmitted to the CCHA. Unfortunately the stigma from downgrading its program stuck with the Fighting Irish and Schafer was unable to bring in many top recruits. Notre Dame finished near the bottom of the league standings for three straight seasons and in 1995 he was relieved of his coaching duties.

== Head coaching record ==
Record table
Season	Team	Overall	Conference	Standing	Postseason
Alaska–Fairbanks Nanooks Independent (1980–1985)
1980–81	Alaska–Fairbanks	1–23–0			
1981–82	Alaska–Fairbanks	4–19–0			
1982–83	Alaska–Fairbanks	19–7–0			
1983–84	Alaska–Fairbanks	22–7–0			
1984–85	Alaska–Fairbanks	21–12–1			
Alaska–Fairbanks:		67–68–1			
Alaska–Fairbanks Nanooks (GWHC) (1985–1987)
1985–86	Alaska–Fairbanks	17–7–1	6–5–1	2nd	
1986–87	Alaska–Fairbanks	17–10–0	7–9–0	3rd	
Alaska–Fairbanks:		34–17–1	13–14–1		
Notre Dame Fighting Irish Independent (1988–1992)
1987–88	Notre Dame	27–4–2			ACHA Champion
1988–89	Notre Dame	10–26–2			
1989–90	Notre Dame	18–15–0			
1990–91	Notre Dame	16–15–2			
1991–92	Notre Dame	12–18–1			
Notre Dame:		83–78–7			
Notre Dame Fighting Irish (CCHA) (1992–1995)
1992–93	Notre Dame	7–27–2	5–23–2	10th	CCHA First Round
1993–94	Notre Dame	11–22–5	9–16–5	8th	CCHA First Round
1994–95	Notre Dame	11–25–1	7–19–1	9th	CCHA Quarterfinals
Notre Dame:		29–74–8	21–58–8		
Total:		213–237–17			
National champion Postseason invitational champion Conference regular season champion Conference regular season and conference tournament champion Division regular season champion Division regular season and conference tournament champion Conference tournament champion
