= Bill Switaj =

Ice hockey coach & director of Kent state University

Biographical details
- Born: September 12, 1960 (age 66); Bay Village, Ohio, USA
- Education: Boston College

Playing career
- 1979–1983: Boston College
- Position: Goaltender

Coaching career (HC unless noted)
- 1983–1984: Rensselaer (Goaltending)
- 1986–1988: Army (Assistant)
- 1988–1994: Kent State

Head coaching record
- Overall: 63–100–13 (.395)

Bill Switaj is an American ice hockey former player and head coach and director of the Kent State University Ice Arena. Today, he is the Director of Club Sports at Bowling Green State University.

== Career ==
Switaj began attending Boston College in the fall of 1979 and eventually worked his way onto the team as a walk-on. After graduating in 1983 he made his way into the coaching ranks, finding a position at Rensselaer as a goalie coach before landing in West Point as an assistant under Rob Riley. Two years later he accepted the head coaching position at Kent State but his first season was quickly torpedoed when the university's president cancelled the season due to a hazing incident.

After the lost season was finished Switaj began putting the program back on the right footing. The Golden Flashes remained an independent program for three more years, posting double-digit wins every season, before they were accepted into the CCHA for the 1992–93 season. Though their first two years in the conference resulted in less than stellar records there was hope for the team but that hope was extinguished when the board of trustees voted to cancel the ice hockey program in 1994. Though Switaj received further coaching offers he elected to remain in Kent as the rink manager, a position he still holds as of 2016.

== Head coaching record ==
Record table
Season	Team	Overall	Conference	Standing	Postseason
Kent State Golden Flashes Independent (1989–1992)
1989–90	Kent State	14–16–3			
1990–91	Kent State	10–22–3			
1991–92	Kent State	15–14–2			
Kent State:		39–52–8			
Kent State Golden Flashes (CCHA) (1992–1994)
1992–93	Kent State	13–22–3	10–19–1	8th	CCHA First Round
1993–94	Kent State	11–26–2	6–22–2	11th	CCHA First Round
Kent State:		24–48–5	16–41–3		
Total:		63–100–13			
National champion Postseason invitational champion Conference regular season champion Conference regular season and conference tournament champion Division regular season champion Division regular season and conference tournament champion Conference tournament champion
