= Anastos =

Anastos (Greek: Ανάστος) is a Greek surname. Notable people with the surname include:

- Ernie Anastos (1943–2026), American television journalist
- Tom Anastos (born 1963), American ice hockey player, coach, and league administrator
