= Blaine Lacher =

Canadian ice hockey player (1970–2024)

- Born: September 5, 1970; Medicine Hat, Alberta, Canada
- Died: January 29, 2024 (aged 53); Medicine Hat, Alberta, Canada
- Height: 6 ft 1 in (185 cm)
- Weight: 205 lb (93 kg; 14 st 9 lb)
- Position: Goaltender
- Caught: Left
- Played for: Boston Bruins
- NHL draft: Undrafted
- Playing career: 1994–1997

Blaine Irwin Lacher (September 5, 1970 – January 29, 2024) was a Canadian professional ice hockey goaltender. Lacher played for the Boston Bruins of the National Hockey League (NHL) in the mid-1990s.

== Biography ==
Lacher was a standout goaltender at Lake Superior State University in college, leading his team to a national championship in 1994. In his final season at Lake Superior State, Lacher led the nation in both save percentage (SV%) and goals against average (GAA) at .918 and 1.98, respectively. He set an NCAA Division I shutout record of 375:01, which still stood as of 2024. Lacher gave up his final year of eligibility to sign as a free agent with the Boston Bruins.

Lacher started his professional career with the Boston Bruins very well, losing only one of his starts down the stretch to get the team into the 1995 Stanley Cup playoffs, where they lost to the eventual Stanley Cup champions, the New Jersey Devils. During the 1994–95 season Lacher made 35 appearances with a 19–11–2 record, 2.41 goals against average (GAA), a .902 save percentage (SV%), and four shutouts.

After being promoted to the full-time starting goaltender the next season, Lacher's earlier performances did not keep up and his statistics suffered. He was part of a rotation of goaltenders in the 1995–96 season, which ended with Craig Billington signing onto the Bruins and when the Bruins traded for one-time Bruins prospect Bill Ranford from the Edmonton Oilers. Lacher played for several teams during the 1995–96 season, playing for the Cleveland Lumberjacks of the International Hockey League (IHL), and the Bruins' minor-league affiliate, the Providence Bruins, of the American Hockey League (AHL). Even in Providence, Lacher's record was hardly up to his numbers from the previous season. With Boston, Lacher's record was 3–5–2 with a poor 3.93 GAA and .845 SV%.

Lacher retired from professional ice hockey after the 1996–97 IHL season with the Grand Rapids Griffins. In 11 games with the Griffins, Lacher was 1–8–1 with a 3.76 GAA and a .877 SV%.

On January 29, 2024, Lacher died in Medicine Hat, Alberta, at the age of 53.

== Career statistics ==
=== Regular season and playoffs ===
			Regular season									Playoffs
Season	Team	League	GP	W	L	T	MIN	GA	SO	GAA	SV%	GP	W	L	MIN	GA	SO	GAA	SV%
1988–89	Melville Millionaires	SJHL	43	—	—	—	—	—	—	4.41	—	—	—	—	—	—	—	—	—
1989–90	Melville Millionaires	SJHL	39	—	—	—	2,250	134	1	3.57	—	—	—	—	—	—	—	—	—
1990–91	Lake Superior State University	WCHA	—	—	—	—	—	—	—	—	—	—	—	—	—	—	—	—	—
1991–92	Lake Superior State University	WCHA	9	5	3	0	410	22	0	3.22	.879	—	—	—	—	—	—	—	—
1992–93	Lake Superior State University	WCHA	34	24	5	3	1,915	86	2	2.70	.892	—	—	—	—	—	—	—	—
1993–94	Lake Superior State University	WCHA	30	20	5	4	1,785	59	6	1.98	.885	—	—	—	—	—	—	—	—
1994–95	Providence Bruins	AHL	1	0	1	0	59	3	0	3.03	.880	—	—	—	—	—	—	—	—
1994–95	Boston Bruins	NHL	35	19	11	2	1,965	79	4	2.41	.902	5	1	4	125	12	0	2.55	.904
1995–96	Providence Bruins	AHL	9	3	5	0	462	30	0	3.90	.878	—	—	—	—	—	—	—	—
1995–96	Boston Bruins	NHL	12	3	5	2	671	44	0	3.94	.845	—	—	—	—	—	—	—	—
1995–96	Cleveland Lumberjacks	IHL	8	3	4	1	478	28	0	3.51	.891	3	0	3	191	10	0	3.14	.899
1996–97	Grand Rapids Griffins	IHL	11	1	8	1	510	32	0	3.76	.877	—	—	—	—	—	—	—	—
NHL totals			47	22	16	4	2,635	123	4	2.80	.887	5	1	4	125	12	0	2.55	.904

== Awards and honours ==
Award	Year	Ref
CCHA All-Tournament Team	1993, 1994	
NCAA All-Tournament Team	1994	

Awards and achievements
Preceded by Darrin Madeley	CCHA Most Valuable Player in Tournament; 1993	Succeeded by Mike Stone
