= John Wallin =

American former ice hockey head coach

Coaching career (HC unless noted)
- 1977-1979: Chicago State University
- 1979-1981: New Trier High School (IL)
- 1984–1987: Kent State
- 1987–1988: Sudbury Wolves

Head coaching record
- Overall: 104–56–9 (.642) (college)

John Wallin is an American former ice hockey head coach who previously headed the program at Kent State.

== Career ==
Wallin arrived in Kent in the summer of 1984 and took over as head coach of the university's club team as well as becoming the director of the Kent State University Ice Arena. After a successful season the Golden Flashes jumped up to the Division I ranks, and won 21 games their first season of competition (though all were exhibition contests). In his third year behind the bench Wallin saw Kent State join an informal conference (along with Notre Dame) and win an additional 19 games. With 51 wins under his belt in three seasons Wallin resigned suddenly in June 1987 and took over behind the bench for the Sudbury Wolves, a junior team in the OHL.

In his first season with the Wolves the team finished dead-last in their division with a 17-48-1 record but things soon became worse. Wallin, who had been called a flamboyant person, had told several of his players at both Kent State and Sudbury about his history as an Army Green Beret and the time he spent as a POW during the Vietnam War; the trouble was those stories were untrue. While he didn't have much focus on his yarns while at Kent State, his time in the Canadian Major Junior leagues brought increased attention and the stories reached the pages of The Hockey News before the Army disavowed his tales. Wallin was promptly dismissed from the club in March. Further injury was dealt to Wallin's reputation when reports surfaced in the 1990s from his former staffers that he had committed numerous recruiting violations while at Kent State and, while they weren't reported to the NCAA, Wallin had been told about them and neglected to address the issues.

== Head coaching record ==
=== College ===
Record table
| Season | Team | Overall | Conference | Standing | Postseason |
|---|---|---|---|---|---|
Kent State Golden Flashes Independent (1984–1987)
| 1984–85 | Kent State | 11–14–2 | | | |
| 1985–86 | Kent State | 21–13–2 | | | |
| 1986–87 | Kent State | 19–13–0 | | | |
| Kent State: | | 51–40–4 | | | |
| Total: | | 51–40–4 | | | |
National champion Postseason invitational champion Conference regular season champion Conference regular season and conference tournament champion Division regular season champion Division regular season and conference tournament champion Conference tournament champion
