= American Collegiate Hockey Association (1986–1989) =

American college ice hockey conference

The American Collegiate Hockey Association (ACHA) was an American college ice hockey conference from 1986 to 1989 made of varsity programs from Division I and Division II of the National Collegiate Athletic Association (NCAA) and from the National Association of Intercollegiate Athletics (NAIA). The league disbanded after three seasons because it did not meet the minimum number of members required to be recognized by the NCAA. The American Collegiate Hockey Association that started in 1991 and governs a national collection of club hockey teams is unaffiliated with the ACHA (1986–1989).

== History ==
The ACHA was formed by two NCAA Division I independent programs, University of Notre Dame Fighting Irish and Kent State University Golden Flashes, one NCAA Division II independent program, Lake Forest College Foresters, and one NAIA program, University of Michigan–Dearborn Wolves. The four schools shared a common philosophy on athletics, education, and finances.

Michigan-Dearborn had sponsored varsity hockey since the 1979–1980 season, but had been left without a governing organization to play under when the NAIA stopped sanctioning hockey after the 1983–1984 season. Notre Dame had dropped varsity hockey after the 1982–1983 season for financial reasons, but restarted the program for the 1984–1985 season as a non-scholarship program. Kent State started varsity hockey for the 1980–1981 season, but with limited scholarships (eight total) they were unable to gain conference affiliation in Division I.

Plans for the league started during the 1985–1986 hockey season. Plans were finalized in June 1986. The University of Alabama-Huntsville was interested in joining the league but league members were concerned about travel costs. Other schools that were interested in possibly joining the league were University of Dayton, Iowa State University, Lawrence University, and St. Norbert College

== Regular season and Tournament Formats ==
Each team played 12 league games, two home, two away against each league member. The tournament was a four-team, single elimination format with hosting rotated year-to-year among conference members.

== Disbandment ==
In September 1988, the Kent State hockey program was embroiled in a hazing incident that sent a near death freshman player to the hospital and resulted in charges against 12 members of the KSU hockey team. In response, President Michael Schwartz made the decision to cancel hockey for the 1988–1989 season. The school would not commit to bringing back varsity hockey until after the 1988–1989 school year. Before the season, Notre Dame had announced that 1988–1989 would be its last season in the ACHA so they could pursue playing a full independent schedule against other Division I teams. These developments left just two teams committed to the conference, both of which were not NCAA Division I sanctioned. The league was disbanded after the 1988–1989 season.

== Aftermath ==
Notre Dame went back to being a Division I independent program and, eventually, joined the Central Collegiate Hockey Association (CCHA) in 1992. Kent State regained its varsity hockey program for the 1989–1990 season. The Golden Flashes applied for and were accepted to the CCHA with the Irish for the 1992–1993 season. Kent State dropped hockey in 1994. Lake Forest dropped to NCAA Division III and joined that division's Northern Collegiate Hockey Association in 1992. Michigan-Dearborn dropped varsity hockey following the 1989–1990 season after failing to gain political and financial support for a move to NCAA Division I in hockey.

== Champions ==
=== Regular season ===
- 1986-1987 Lake Forest
- 1987-1988 Michigan-Dearborn
- 1988-1989 Michigan-Dearborn

=== Tournament Champions ===
Year	Winning team	Coach	Losing team	Coach	Score	Location	Venue	Reference
1987	Michigan-Dearborn	Dave Rosteck	Notre Dame	Lefty Smith	6-4	Notre Dame, Indiana	Athletic and Convocation Center	
1988	Notre Dame	Ric Schafer	Michigan-Dearborn	Tom Anastos	5-2	Dearborn, Michigan	University of Michigan-Dearborn Fieldhouse	
1989	Canceled^{*}					Kent, Ohio	Kent State University Ice Arena	

== Year-by-year Results ==
=== 1986–87 ===
1986–87 American Collegiate Hockey Association standings
	Conference							Overall					
	GP	W	L	T	PTS	GF	GA	GP	W	L	T	GF	GA
Lake Forest †	12	8	3	1	17	49	44	26	15	10	1	123	86
Kent State	12	7	5	0	14	-	-	32	19	13	0	-	-
Notre Dame	12	4	7	1	9	40	47	30	10	19	1	103	122
Michigan–Dearborn *	12	3	7	2	8	-	-	41	21	18	2	-	-
Championship: March 7, 1987 † indicates division regular season champion * indicates conference tournament champion

==== 1987 Tournament ====
Conference Semifinals; March 6
1	Lake Forest	1
3	Notre Dame	4
2	Kent State	1
3	Michigan–Dearborn	6

Conference Championship; March 7
3	Notre Dame	4
4	Michigan–Dearborn	6
Third place
1	Lake Forest	2
2	Kent State	6

=== 1987–88 ===
1987–88 American Collegiate Hockey Association standings
	Conference							Overall					
	GP	W	L	T	PTS	GF	GA	GP	W	L	T	GF	GA
Michigan–Dearborn †	12	10	1	1	20	-	-	42	25	14	3	-	-
Notre Dame *	12	7	3	2	16	60	44	33	27	4	2	222	114
Lake Forest	12	4	7	2	10	48	58	26	13	12	1	130	99
Kent State	12	0	10	2	2	-	-	40	11	26	3	-	-
Championship: March 5, 1988 † indicates division regular season champion * indicates conference tournament champion

==== 1988 Tournament ====
Conference Semifinals; March 4
1	Michigan–Dearborn	9
4	Kent State	2
2	Notre Dame	5
3	Lake Forest	3

Conference Championship; March 5
1	Michigan–Dearborn	2
2	Notre Dame	5
Third place
3	Lake Forest	7
4	Kent State	0

=== 1988–89 ===
1988–89 American Collegiate Hockey Association standings
	Conference							Overall					
	GP	W	L	T	Ptc.	GF	GA	GP	W	L	T	GF	GA
Michigan–Dearborn †	12	10	1	1	.875	-	-	36	21	12	3	-	-
Notre Dame	11	3	7	1	.318	39	50	38	10	26	2	127	189
Lake Forest	11	3	8	0	.273	34	56	24	14	9	1	131	95
Kent State	0	0	0	0	-	-	-	0	0	0	0	-	-
Championship: Cancelled † indicates division regular season champion

== Notes ==
The ACHA tournament was scheduled to take place on the campus of Kent State University. When Kent State canceled their season, the tournament was canceled.
