= CCHA Most Valuable Player in Tournament =

- Sport: Ice hockey
- Awarded for: The Most Valuable Player in the CCHA Tournament

History
- First award: 1972
- Most recent: Alex Tracy

The CCHA Most Valuable Player in Tournament is an annual award given out at the conclusion of the Central Collegiate Hockey Association conference tournament to the most valuable player in the championship, as voted by the coaches of each CCHA team.

== History ==
The Most Valuable Player in Tournament was first awarded in 1972, but was not conferred again until 1982. After that time, it had been bestowed every year until 2013 when the original CCHA was dissolved as a consequence of the Big Ten Conference forming its men's ice hockey conference. In 1998, the most valuable player award for the CCHA Men's Ice Hockey Tournament was renamed the Bill Beagan Trophy. In 2001, Ryan Miller won the award for the second time, becoming the only player to ever win it more than once.

In 2020, the CCHA was revived by seven schools that had been members of the Western Collegiate Hockey Association, with conference play starting in 2021–22. The conference tournament returned that season, and the MVP award was intended to return as well, however, the award was not presented in the revived league's first tournament in 2022, possibly due to the controversial end to the game. The MVP would not be presented again until the 2025 tournament, in which Evan Murr became the first defenseman to become the conference's tournament most valuable player. The award was renamed back to the CCHA Tournament MVP Award when presented that season.

== Award winners ==
Year	Winner	Position	School
1972	Bill McKenzie	Goaltender	Ohio State
1982	Ron Scott	Goaltender	Michigan State
1983	Mike David*	Goaltender	Bowling Green
1984	Glenn Healy*	Goaltender	Western Michigan
1985	Norm Foster	Goaltender	Michigan State
1986	Bill Horn	Goaltender	Western Michigan
1987	Bobby Reynolds	Right wing	Michigan State
1988	Paul Connell	Goaltender	Bowling Green
1989	Jason Muzzatti	Goaltender	Michigan State
1990	Peter White	Center	Michigan State
1991	Clayton Beddoes	Center	Lake Superior State
1992	Darrin Madeley	Goaltender	Lake Superior State
1993	Blaine Lacher	Goaltender	Lake Superior State
1994	Mike Stone	Center	Michigan
1995	Wayne Strachan	Right wing	Lake Superior State
1996	John Madden	Center	Michigan
1997	Brendan Morrison	Center	Michigan

Note: * recipient not on championship team

Year	Winner	Position	School
1998	Mike York	Center	Michigan State
1999	Mark Kosick	Center	Michigan
2000	Ryan Miller	Goaltender	Michigan State
2001	Ryan Miller	Goaltender	Michigan State
2002	Mike Cammalleri	Left wing	Michigan
2003	Jed Ortmeyer	Right wing	Michigan
2004	Paul Caponigri	Forward	Ohio State
2005	Jeff Tambellini	Left wing	Michigan
2006	Jeff Lerg	Goaltender	Michigan State
2007	David Brown	Goaltender	Notre Dame
2008	Tim Miller	Left wing	Michigan
2009	Jordan Pearce	Goaltender	Notre Dame
2010	Shawn Hunwick	Goaltender	Michigan
2011	Andy Miele	Center	Miami
2012	Frank Slubowski	Goaltender	Western Michigan
2013	T. J. Tynan	Center	Notre Dame
2025	Evan Murr	Defenceman	Minnesota State
2026	Alex Tracy	Goaltender	Minnesota State

=== Winners by school ===
School	Winners
Michigan	9
Michigan State	9
Lake Superior State	4
Notre Dame	3
Western Michigan	3
Bowling Green	2
Ohio State	2
Miami	1
Minnesota State	2

=== Winners by position ===
Position	Winners
Center	9
Right wing	3
Left wing	3
Forward	1
Defenceman	1
Goaltender	18

== See also ==
- CCHA Awards
- CCHA Men's Ice Hockey Tournament
- List of CCHA Men's Ice Hockey Tournament champions
