= Kent State Golden Flashes men's ice hockey =

- University: Kent State University
- Conference: CCHA
- Arena: Kent State University Ice Arena; Kent, Ohio
- Colors: Navy blue and gold

The Kent State Golden Flashes Men's Ice Hockey was an NCAA Division I ice hockey team from 1980 to 1994. Kent State hockey was promoted to Division I status by the Board of Trustees on June 12, 1980, following ten years as a club sport. The program joined fellow independent Notre Dame to form the American Collegiate Hockey Association from 1986 to 1989 (not to be confused with the ACHA formed in 1991).

== History ==
After a 19-win campaign in his third season with the club John Wallin left to take over the Sudbury Wolves of the Ontario Hockey League in 1987. After Kent State alum Tom Viggiano headed the program for the 1987–88 season, Bill Switaj was brought in once it was confirmed that the program would continue to exist beyond 1988 despite budgetary concerns. The program's entire season was cancelled that September in response to a hazing incident.

The Golden Flashes would finally debut with Switaj as their coach in 1989. After three seasons they were eventually accepted into the Central Collegiate Hockey Association (CCHA) but Kent State's program ended in the spring of 1994 when university president Carol Cartwright made a recommendation to the board of trustees that the program be discontinued.

== Season-by-season results ==
NAIA/NCAA D-I Champions	NAIA/NCAA Frozen Four	Conference Regular Season Champions	Conference Playoff Champions

Season	Conference	Regular Season (Note: Code explanation; GP—Games Played, W—Wins, L—Losses, T—Tied games, OTW—Overtime Wins, OTL—Overtime Loses, 3/SW—Win in 3 on 3 overtime or shootout, Pts—Points*)														Conference Tournament Results	National Tournament Results
Season	Conference	Conference									Overall					Conference Tournament Results	National Tournament Results
Season	Conference	GP	W	L	T	OTW	OTL	3/SW	Pts*	Finish	GP	W	L	T	%	Conference Tournament Results	National Tournament Results
Doug Ross (1980 — 1981)
1980–81	Independent	-	-	-	-	-	-	-	-	-	35	17	18	0	.486		
Tom Newton (1981 — 1982)
1981–82	Independent	-	-	-	-	-	-	-	-	-	29	12	17	0	.414		
Don Lumley (1982 — 1984)
1982–83	Independent	-	-	-	-	-	-	-	-	-	31	6	25	0	.194		
1983–84	Independent	-	-	-	-	-	-	-	-	-	27	16	11	0	.593		
John Wallin (1984 — 1987)
1984–85	Independent	-	-	-	-	-	-	-	-	-	27	11	14	2	.444		
1985–86	Independent	-	-	-	-	-	-	-	-	-	36	21	13	2	.611		
1986–87	AHCA	12	7	5	0	-	-	-	14	2nd	32	19	13	0	.594	Lost AHCA Quarterfinal, 1–6 (Michigan–Dearborn); Won AHCA Third Place Game, 6–2 (Lake Forest)	
Tom Viggiano (1987 — 1988)
1987–88	AHCA	12	0	10	2	-	-	-	2	4th	46	11	26	3	.313	Lost AHCA Quarterfinal, 2–9 (Michigan–Dearborn); Lost AHCA Third Place Game, 0–7 (Lake Forest)	
Bill Switaj (1988 — 1994)
1988–89	AHCA	Season cancelled due to hazing scandal															
1989–90	Independent	-	-	-	-	-	-	-	-	-	33	14	16	3	.470		
1990–91	Independent	-	-	-	-	-	-	-	-	-	35	10	22	3	.329		
1991–92	Independent	-	-	-	-	-	-	-	-	-	31	15	14	2	.516		
1992–93	CCHA	30	10	19	1	-	-	-	21	8th	38	13	22	3	.382	Lost CCHA First Round series, 0–2 (Michigan State)	
1993–94	CCHA	30	6	22	2	-	-	-	14	11th	39	11	26	2	.308	Lost CCHA First Round series, 0–2 (Michigan)	
Totals											GP	W	L	T	%	Championships	
Regular Season											431	197	211	23	.484		
Conference Post-season											8	1	7	0	.125		
NCAA Post-season											0	0	0	0	–		
Regular Season and Post-season Record											439	198	218	23	.477		

== Golden Flashes in the NHL ==
Player	Position	Team(s)	Years	Games	Stanley Cups
Dean Sylvester	Right wing	BUF, ATL	1998–2001	96	0
