= Tom Anastos =

American ice hockey coach (born 1963)

Biographical details
- Born: July 5, 1963 (age 63); Dearborn, Michigan

Playing career
- 1981–1985: Michigan State

Coaching career (HC unless noted)
- 1986–1987: Michigan-Dearborn (assistant)
- 1987–1990: Michigan-Dearborn
- 1990–1992: Michigan State (assistant)
- 2011–2017: Michigan State

Head coaching record
- Overall: 124–147–30 (.462)

Thomas A. Anastos (born July 5, 1963) is an American ice hockey coach, former player, and former league administrator. He was most recently the head coach of the Michigan State Spartans men's ice hockey team (MSU), a member of the Big Ten Conference (Big Ten) in Division I of the National Collegiate Athletic Association (NCAA). He played junior hockey for the Paddock Pool Saints, college hockey for the Michigan State University Spartans and professional hockey for the Sherbrooke Canadiens. He was an ice hockey league administrator most recently serving as commissioner of the original Central Collegiate Hockey Association (CCHA), a now defunct NCAA Division I conference, from 1998-2012. (Note: A new CCHA was formally organized in 2020 and is set to start play in the 2021–22 season.) Anastos is a member of the Dearborn (Michigan) Sports Hall of Fame, inducted in 2000.

== Playing career ==
=== Junior hockey ===
Anastos played junior hockey from 1979 to 1981 for the Paddock Pool Saints in Ecorse, Michigan, a U.S. Junior A hockey program of the Great Lakes Junior Hockey League, now named the North American Hockey League. Paddock Pool won the league championship during both of Anastos' seasons with the team. He has the distinction of being the first ever NAHL player drafted by an NHL team when he was selected in the sixth round, 124th overall, by the Montreal Canadiens in the 1981 NHL entry draft. Anastos played the center position in juniors.

=== College hockey ===
In 1980, Anastos was drafted by the London Knights of the Ontario Hockey League, but he chose to play college hockey at Michigan State after being recruited by MSU assistant coach Shawn Walsh. A four-year letter-winner under coach Ron Mason from 1981–1985, Anastos played in 151 games, notched 70 goals and 73 assists for 153 total career points. Anastos holds the MSU school record for short-handed goals in a season (7 in 1983–1984). His 10 career short-handed goals are tied for fourth all-time in MSU hockey history. Anastos played the right wing position in college.

As a senior, Anastos earned second-team all-conference honors and was named to the all-tournament teams at the Great Lakes Invitational in 1984 and the CCHA Tournament in 1985.

=== Professional hockey ===
Anastos joined the American Hockey League Sherbrooke Canadiens, the top farm club of the Montreal Canadiens, in 1985. In one season for Sherbrooke, he played in 55 games notching nine goals and 18 assists. Anastos retired from playing hockey in 1986 to finish his college degree.

== Coaching career ==
Anastos has coached for one National Association of Intercollegiate Athletics (NAIA) program, the University of Michigan-Dearborn Wolves (UMD), and one NCAA program, the Michigan State University Spartans. While at Michigan-Dearborn, Anastos guided the Wolves to two conference championships. In eight seasons as a head coach, Anastos has compiled a record of 136 wins, 127 losses and 41 ties.

=== Michigan–Dearborn ===
Anastos was named an assistant coach for the varsity ice hockey program at the University of Michigan–Dearborn (UMD) by head coach Dave Rosteck prior to the 1986-87 season. Rosteck resigned at the end of the season to become athletic director and Anastos, age 23, was named head coach on March 11, 1987. In hopes of moving the hockey program to NCAA Division I status, UMD under Anastos increased full scholarships to over 15 and played over 20 games per season against NCAA Division I competition which included the likes of Alaska, Alaska–Anchorage, Air Force, Maine, Miami, Michigan State, Notre Dame, Union, and Western Michigan. He achieved a 68–37–7 record over three seasons while Michigan–Dearborn administration was simultaneously conducting a three-year evaluation of athletics. The evaluation was supposed to help move UMD from NAIA to NCAA Division II, the Great Lakes Intercollegiate Athletic Conference and the Central Collegiate Hockey Association. Instead, the evaluation suggested keeping only the sports the NAIA sponsored or eliminating varsity athletics altogether because a move to NCAA Division II status would increase the athletic budget and quadruple student fees.

=== Michigan State ===
With varsity status uncertain at UMD, Anastos accepted an assistant coach position at Michigan State University in 1990. Shortly after Anastos resigned, Michigan-Dearborn dropped varsity hockey since the sport was not sanctioned by the NAIA (the association stopped sponsoring hockey in 1984) and the team was not sanctioned by the NCAA.

On July 21, 1992, Anastos resigned as assistant coach at Michigan State to enter private business in the Detroit area.

Anastos returned to Michigan State on March 23, 2011 when he was named head coach. He succeeded Rick Comley whose contract was not renewed following the 2010-2011 season. Anastos was the sixth head coach in the history of Michigan State hockey. During his first season as head coach, he guided Michigan State to its 27th appearance in the NCAA Tournament losing to Union College in the first round.

== Career as administrator ==
=== North American Hockey League ===
Anastos was president of the North American Hockey League from 1994-1998. As president, Anastos oversaw expansion to Sault Ste. Marie, Michigan, St. Louis, and Chicago.

=== Central Collegiate Hockey Association ===
He was announced as the new commissioner of the Central Collegiate Hockey Association (CCHA) on March 18, 1998, a role he served in through 2011. While Commissioner of the CCHA, Anastos was recognized by The Hockey News for his last five years on the list of the 100 most influential and powerful people in the sport. He also served as President of the Hockey Commissioner's Association (HCA), a group composed of the five commissioners from NCAA Division I Hockey. In 2010, “he was key in the procuring of a grant from the National Hockey League through USA Hockey. The funding was used . . . to create College Hockey Inc., an educational and promotional entity charged with raising the profile and help foster the growth of college hockey”.

== Education ==
Anastos attended Fordson High School in Dearborn, Michigan. Anastos received a bachelor's degree in construction management from Michigan State University in 1987.

== Personal ==
Before taking the head coaching job in East Lansing, Anastos lived in Farmington Hills, Michigan with his wife, Lisa. They have five children, daughters Lauren, Jenna, Alyssa, and Andrea, and son Andrew. Lauren played four years of NCAA Division III hockey at Adrian College. Jenna played college basketball at Division II Northwood University. Andrea (Andie) is a senior forward and captain on the Boston College Eagles women's ice hockey team.

== Head coaching record ==
Record table
Season	Team	Overall	Conference	Standing	Postseason
Michigan–Dearborn Wolverines (ACHA) (1987–1989)
1987–88	Michigan–Dearborn	25–14–3	10–1–1	1st	
1988–89	Michigan–Dearborn	21–12–3	10–1–1	1st	
Michigan–Dearborn Wolverines (Club) (1989–1990)
1989–90	Michigan–Dearborn	22–11–1			
Michigan-Dearborn:		46–26–6 *	20–2–2		
Michigan State Spartans (CCHA) (2011–2013)
2011–12	Michigan State	19–16–4	14–11–3–2	5th	NCAA East Regional semifinals
2012–13	Michigan State	14–25–3	9–18–1–0	11th	CCHA quarterfinals
Michigan State Spartans (Big Ten) (2013–2017)
2013–14	Michigan State	11–18–7	5–9–6–4	5th	Big Ten quarterfinals
2014–15	Michigan State	17–16–2	11–7–2–2	2nd	Big Ten semifinals
2015–16	Michigan State	10–23–4	6–12–2–1	5th	Big Ten quarterfinals
2016–17	Michigan State	7–24–4	3–14–3–0	6th	Big Ten quarterfinals
Michigan State:		78–121–24	48–71–17–9		
Total:		124–147–30 *			
National champion Postseason invitational champion Conference regular season champion Conference regular season and conference tournament champion Division regular season champion Division regular season and conference tournament champion Conference tournament champion

* Excluding club totals.

== Awards and honours ==
Award	Year
All-CCHA Second Team	1984–85
CCHA All-Tournament team	1985

== See also ==
- Michigan State Spartans men's ice hockey
