= 1997 CCHA men's ice hockey tournament =

1997 CCHA Men's ice hockey tournament
- Dates: March 7–15, 1997
- Teams: 8
- Finals site: Joe Louis Arena; Detroit, Michigan
- Champions: Michigan (3rd title)
- Winning coach: Red Berenson (3rd title)
- MVP: Brendan Morrison (Michigan)
- CCHA Men's Ice Hockey Tournaments

The 1997 CCHA Men's Ice Hockey Tournament was the 26th CCHA Men's Ice Hockey Tournament. It was played between March 7 and March 15, 1997. Opening round games were played at campus sites, while all 'final four' games were played at Joe Louis Arena in Detroit, Michigan. By winning the tournament, Michigan received the Central Collegiate Hockey Association's automatic bid to the 1997 NCAA Division I Men's Ice Hockey Tournament.

== Format ==
The tournament featured three rounds of play. The two teams that finish below eighth place in the standings were not eligible for postseason play. In the quarterfinals, the first and eighth seeds, the second and seventh seeds, the third seed and sixth seeds and the fourth seed and fifth seeds played a best-of-three series, with the winners advancing to the semifinals. In the semifinals, the remaining highest and lowest seeds and second highest and second lowest seeds play a single-game, with the winners advancing to the finals. The tournament champion receives an automatic bid to the 1997 NCAA Division I Men's Ice Hockey Tournament.

== Conference standings ==
Note: GP = Games played; W = Wins; L = Losses; T = Ties; PTS = Points; GF = Goals For; GA = Goals Against

1996–97 Central Collegiate Hockey Association standings
	Conference							Overall					
	GP	W	L	T	PTS	GF	GA	GP	W	L	T	GF	GA
Michigan†*	27	21	3	3	46	151	64	43	35	4	4	242	98
Miami	27	19	7	1	39	112	79	40	27	12	1	174	119
Michigan State	27	16	7	4	36	99	76	40	23	13	4	145	118
Lake Superior State	27	15	8	4	34	106	98	38	19	14	5	154	142
Bowling Green	27	10	12	5	25	100	104	38	17	16	5	158	142
Western Michigan	27	10	12	5	25	94	99	37	14	18	5	125	134
Ohio State	27	9	16	2	20	95	132	39	12	25	2	135	190
Alaska-Fairbanks	27	8	18	1	17	92	126	37	14	22	1	135	169
Ferris State	27	7	18	2	16	83	121	37	11	23	3	125	166
Notre Dame	27	6	20	1	13	73	106	35	9	25	1	92	131
Championship: Michigan † indicates conference regular season champion * indicates conference tournament champion Final rankings: USA Today/American Hockey Magazine Coaches Poll Top 10 Poll

== Bracket ==
Quarterfinals; March 7–9
1	Michigan	8	11	–
8	Alaska–Fairbanks	1	0	–
2	Miami	4	4	–
7	Ohio State	1	2	–
(Pairings are reseeded after the first round)
3	Michigan State	4	3	–
6	Western Michigan	1	1	–
4	Lake Superior State	3	4	–
5	Bowling Green	5	8	–

Semifinals; March 13
1	Michigan	7
5	Bowling Green	2
2	Miami	3
3	Michigan State	4*

Championship; March 15
1	Michigan	3
3	Michigan State	1

Note: * denotes overtime period(s)

=== Quarterfinals ===
==== (1) Michigan vs. (8) Alaska–Fairbanks ====
Michigan	8 – 1	Alaska	Yost Ice Arena

Michigan	11 – 0	Alaska	Yost Ice Arena

Michigan won series 2–0

==== (2) Miami vs. (7) Ohio State ====
Miami	4 – 1	Ohio State	Goggin Ice Arena

Miami	4 – 2	Ohio State	Goggin Ice Arena

Miami won series 2–0

==== (3) Michigan State vs. (6) Western Michigan ====
Michigan State	4 – 1	Western Michigan	Munn Ice Arena

Michigan State	3 – 1	Western Michigan	Munn Ice Arena

Michigan State won series 2–0

==== (4) Lake Superior State vs. (5) Bowling Green ====
Lake Superior State	3 – 5	Bowling Green	Taffy Abel Arena

Lake Superior State	4 – 8	Bowling Green	Taffy Abel Arena

Bowling Green won series 2–0

=== Semifinals ===
==== (1) Michigan vs. (5) Bowling Green ====
March 14	Michigan	7 – 2	Bowling Green	Joe Louis Arena

==== (2) Miami vs. (3) Michigan State ====
March 14	Miami	3 – 4	OT	Michigan State	Joe Louis Arena

=== Championship ===
==== (1) Michigan vs. (3) Michigan State ====
March 15	Michigan	3 – 1	Michigan State	Joe Louis Arena

== Tournament awards ==
=== All-Tournament Team ===
- F Mike Watt (Michigan State)
- F Jason Botterill (Michigan)
- F Brendan Morrison* (Michigan)
- D Mike Weaver (Michigan State)
- D Chris Bogas (Michigan State)
- G Chad Alban (Michigan State)

* Most Valuable Player(s)
