= 1989 CCHA men's ice hockey tournament =

1989 CCHA Men's ice hockey tournament
- Dates: March 3–11, 1989
- Teams: 8
- Finals site: Joe Louis Arena; Detroit, Michigan
- Champions: Michigan State (6th title)
- Winning coach: Ron Mason (9th title)
- MVP: Jason Muzzatti (Michigan State)
- CCHA Men's Ice Hockey Tournaments

The 1989 CCHA Men's Ice Hockey Tournament was the 18th CCHA Men's Ice Hockey Tournament. It was played between March 3 and March 11, 1989. First round games were played at campus sites, while 'final four' games were played at Joe Louis Arena in Detroit, Michigan. By winning the tournament, Michigan State received the Central Collegiate Hockey Association's automatic bid to the 1989 NCAA Division I Men's Ice Hockey Tournament.

== Format ==
The tournament featured three rounds of play. The team that finished below eighth place in the standings was not eligible for postseason play. In the quarterfinals, the first and eighth seeds, the second and seventh seeds, the third seed and sixth seeds and the fourth seed and fifth seeds played a best-of-three series, with the winners advancing to the semifinals. In the semifinals, the remaining highest and lowest seeds and second highest and second lowest seeds play a single-game, with the winners advancing to the finals. The tournament champion receives an automatic bid to the 1989 NCAA Division I Men's Ice Hockey Tournament.

== Conference standings ==
Note: GP = Games played; W = Wins; L = Losses; T = Ties; PTS = Points; GF = Goals For; GA = Goals Against

1988–89 Central Collegiate Hockey Association standings
	Conference							Overall					
	GP	W	L	T	PTS	GF	GA	GP	W	L	T	GF	GA
Michigan State†*	32	25	6	1	51	188	95	47	37	9	1	277	150
Lake Superior State	32	19	7	6	44	128	90	46	29	11	6	186	129
Illinois-Chicago	32	18	10	4	40	132	120	42	23	14	5	178	154
Michigan	32	17	11	4	38	137	118	41	22	15	4	177	154
Bowling Green	32	15	14	3	33	131	125	47	26	18	3	202	171
Western Michigan	32	9	17	6	24	121	145	43	14	23	6	182	200
Ferris State	32	9	18	5	23	99	144	40	12	22	6	126	171
Ohio State	32	7	20	5	19	106	160	40	9	26	5	141	215
Miami	32	8	24	0	16	125	170	38	11	27	0	158	198
Championship: Michigan State † indicates conference regular season champion * indicates conference tournament champion

== Bracket ==
Quarterfinals; March 3–5
1	Michigan State	9	11	–
8	Ohio State	5	4	–
2	Lake Superior State	5	3	–
7	Ferris State	0	0	–
(Pairings are reseeded after the first round)
3	Illinois–Chicago	8	4	6
6	Western Michigan	4	6	2
4	Michigan	4	4	2
5	Bowling Green	6	1	3***

Semifinals; March 9
1	Michigan State	3
5	Bowling Green	2
2	Lake Superior State	6
3	Illinois–Chicago	3

Championship; March 11
1	Michigan State	4
2	Lake Superior State	1
Consolation Game
3	Illinois–Chicago	3
5	Bowling Green	5

Note: * denotes overtime period(s)

=== First round ===
==== (1) Michigan State vs. (8) Ohio State ====
Michigan State	9 – 5	Ohio State	Munn Ice Arena

Michigan State	11 – 4	Ohio State	Munn Ice Arena

Michigan State won series 2–0

==== (2) Lake Superior State vs. (7) Ferris State ====
Lake Superior State	5 – 0	Ferris State	Taffy Abel Arena

Lake Superior State	3 – 0	Ferris State	Taffy Abel Arena

Lake Superior State won series 2–0

==== (3) Illinois–Chicago vs. (6) Western Michigan ====
Illinois–Chicago	8 – 4	Western Michigan	UIC Pavilion

Illinois–Chicago	4 – 6	Western Michigan	UIC Pavilion

Illinois–Chicago	6 – 2	Western Michigan	UIC Pavilion

Illinois–Chicago won series 2–1

==== (4) Michigan vs. (5) Bowling Green ====
Michigan	4 – 6	Bowling Green	Yost Ice Arena

Michigan	4 – 1	Bowling Green	Yost Ice Arena

Michigan	2 – 3	3OT	Bowling Green	Yost Ice Arena

Bowling Green won series 2–1

=== Semifinals ===
==== (1) Michigan State vs. (5) Bowling Green ====
March 9	Michigan State	3 – 2	Bowling Green	Joe Louis Arena

==== (2) Lake Superior State vs. (3) Illinois–Chicago ====
March 9	Lake Superior State	6 – 3	Illinois–Chicago	Joe Louis Arena

=== Consolation Game ===
==== (3) Illinois–Chicago vs. (5) Bowling Green ====
March 11	Illinois–Chicago	3 – 5	Bowling Green	Joe Louis Arena

=== Championship ===
==== (1) Michigan State vs. (2) Lake Superior State ====
March 11	Michigan State	4 – 1	Lake Superior State	Joe Louis Arena

== Tournament awards ==
=== All-Tournament Team ===
- F Anthony Palumbo (Lake Superior State)
- F Sheldon Gorski (Illinois–Chicago)
- F Bobby Reynolds (Michigan State)
- D Dan Keczmer (Lake Superior State)
- D Brad Hamilton (Michigan State)
- G Jason Muzzatti* (Michigan State)

* Most Valuable Player(s)
