= 1996 CCHA men's ice hockey tournament =

1996 CCHA Men's ice hockey tournament
- Dates: March 8–16, 1996
- Teams: 8
- Finals site: Joe Louis Arena; Detroit, Michigan
- Champions: Michigan (2nd title)
- Winning coach: Red Berenson (2nd title)
- MVP: John Madden (Michigan)
- CCHA Men's Ice Hockey Tournaments

The 1996 CCHA Men's Ice Hockey Tournament was the 25th CCHA Men's Ice Hockey Tournament. It was played between March 8 and March 16, 1996. Opening round games were played at campus sites, while all 'final four' games were played at Joe Louis Arena in Detroit, Michigan. By winning the tournament, Michigan received the Central Collegiate Hockey Association's automatic bid to the 1996 NCAA Division I Men's Ice Hockey Tournament.

== Format ==
The tournament featured three rounds of play. The three teams that finish below eighth place in the standings were not eligible for postseason play. In the quarterfinals, the first and eighth seeds, the second and seventh seeds, the third seed and sixth seeds and the fourth seed and fifth seeds played a best-of-three series, with the winners advancing to the semifinals. In the semifinals, the remaining highest and lowest seeds and second highest and second lowest seeds play a single-game, with the winners advancing to the finals. The tournament champions received an automatic bid to the 1996 NCAA Division I Men's Ice Hockey Tournament.

== Conference standings ==
Note: GP = Games played; W = Wins; L = Losses; T = Ties; PTS = Points; GF = Goals For; GA = Goals Against

1995–96 Central Collegiate Hockey Association standings
	Conference							Overall					
	GP	W	L	T	PTS	GF	GA	GP	W	L	T	GF	GA
Lake Superior State†	30	22	6	2	46	136	89	40	30	8	2	184	109
Michigan†*	30	22	6	2	46	178	71	43	34	7	2	239	93
Michigan State	30	22	7	1	45	115	86	42	28	13	1	154	129
Western Michigan	30	21	6	3	45	125	71	41	27	11	3	172	111
Bowling Green	30	18	11	1	37	126	106	41	26	14	1	172	138
Ferris State	30	10	17	3	23	101	120	38	13	22	3	126	196
Miami	30	9	17	4	22	99	142	36	10	22	4	119	168
Ohio State	30	8	17	5	21	82	105	34	10	19	5	94	118
Alaska-Fairbanks	30	8	22	0	16	101	142	34	10	23	1	114	152
Notre Dame	30	6	20	4	16	87	136	36	9	23	4	110	159
Illinois-Chicago	30	6	23	1	13	73	155	36	9	24	3	97	177
Championship: Michigan † indicates conference regular season champion * indicates conference tournament champion Final rankings: USA Today/American Hockey Magazine Coaches Poll Top 10 Poll

== Bracket ==
Quarterfinals; March 8–10
1	Lake Superior State	4*	8	–
8	Ohio State	3	2	–
2	Michigan	5	3	–
7	Miami	1	0	–
(Pairings are reseeded after the first round)
3	Michigan State	3*	3	3
6	Ferris State	2	5	1
4	Western Michigan	1	1	–
5	Bowling Green	8	3	–

Semifinals; March 14
1	Lake Superior State	7
5	Bowling Green	0
2	Michigan	6
3	Michigan State	2

Championship; March 16
1	Lake Superior State	3
2	Michigan	4

Note: * denotes overtime period(s)

=== Quarterfinals ===
==== (1) Lake Superior State vs. (8) Ohio State ====
Lake Superior State	4 – 3	OT	Ohio State	Taffy Abel Arena

Lake Superior State	8 – 2	Ohio State	Taffy Abel Arena

Lake Superior State won series 2–0

==== (2) Michigan vs. (7) Miami ====
Michigan	5 – 1	Miami	Yost Ice Arena

Michigan	3 – 0	Miami	Yost Ice Arena

Michigan won series 2–0

==== (3) Michigan State vs. (6) Ferris State ====
Michigan State	3 – 2	OT	Ferris State	Munn Ice Arena

Michigan State	1 – 5	Ferris State	Munn Ice Arena

Michigan State	3 – 1	Ferris State	Munn Ice Arena

Michigan State won series 2–1

==== (4) Western Michigan vs. (5) Bowling Green ====
Western Michigan	1 – 8	Bowling Green	Lawson Arena

Western Michigan	1 – 3	Bowling Green	Lawson Arena

Bowling Green won series 2–0

=== Semifinals ===
==== (1) Lake Superior State vs. (5) Bowling Green ====
March 14	Lake Superior State	7 – 0	Bowling Green	Joe Louis Arena

==== (2) Michigan vs. (3) Michigan State ====
March 14	Michigan	6 – 2	Michigan State	Joe Louis Arena

=== Championship ===
==== (1) Lake Superior State vs. (2) Michigan ====
March 16	Lake Superior State	3 – 4	Michigan	Joe Louis Arena

== Tournament awards ==
=== All-Tournament Team ===
- F Bobby Hayes (Michigan)
- F Gerald Tallaire (Lake Superior State)
- F John Madden* (Michigan)
- D Keith Aldridge (Lake Superior State)
- D Harold Schock (Michigan)
- G John Grahame (Lake Superior State)

* Most Valuable Player(s)
