= Kent State University Ice Arena =

American ice arena

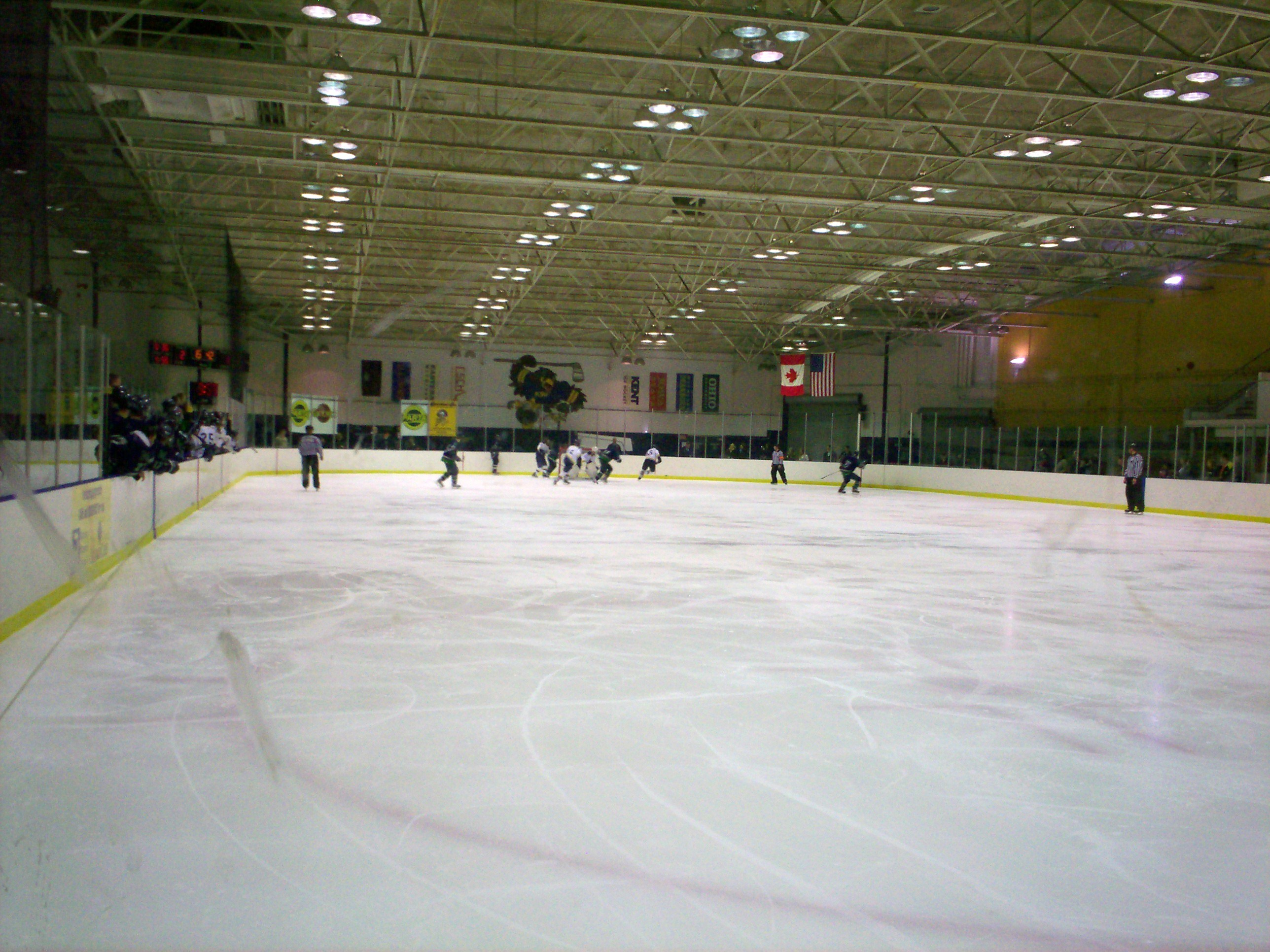
- Interactive map of Kent State University Ice Arena
- Location: 1 Loop Road; Kent, Ohio 44242
- Coordinates: 41°08′44″N 81°20′09″W
- Owner: Kent State University
- Operator: Kent State University
- Capacity: 1,500

Construction
- Opened: 1970

Tenants
- Kent State Golden Flashes; Men's ice hockey (NCAA) (1980–1994); Men's ice hockey (ACHA) (1994–present)

The KSU Ice Arena is a one-rink ice complex located on the campus of Kent State University in Kent, Ohio, United States. The building contains one ice rink with seating for 1,500 fans that is used for ice hockey and figure skating. The rink is connected to a large lobby and snack bar. The facility also includes a meeting room and a skate-sharpening service. The building was built in 1970 and underwent a major renovation project in 2006–2007 which included seating and locker room upgrades in the main arena. Another major renovation project began in 2023 which eliminated a second rink in the building, replacing it with a connected, but separate, facility focused on music education.

== Tenants ==
The building was built in 1970 for student recreation and as the home first of a club hockey team known as the "Clippers" from 1970–1980 and later for the varsity Kent State Golden Flashes men's ice hockey team, which played there from 1980 through the 1993–94 season when the university eliminated NCAA ice hockey due to budget concerns. From 1992 to 1994 the team was a member of the Central Collegiate Hockey Association (CCHA). Since 1994, the arena has hosted the men's club-level team, which competes in the American Collegiate Hockey Association (ACHA) Division I as a member of the College Hockey Mid-America (CHMA). An additional club team that competes in the Division III level of the ACHA as a member of College Hockey East began play in 2019. The ice arena also hosts the Kent Cyclones youth teams as well as four area high school teams: Theodore Roosevelt High School in Kent, Western Reserve Academy and Hudson High School in Hudson, and Stow–Munroe Falls High School in Stow. The arena is also home to the Kent Skating Club, associated with the United States Figure Skating Association. In 2021 the university announced plans to create a facility for the university's marching band there due to a planned loss of facilities elsewhere on campus.

== Interior ==
The main arena, used for ice hockey and figure skating, consists of two sections of bleacher seating, one section along each sideline. The north side bleachers are located behind the team benches and include a small balcony section and press area. The south side bleachers are elevated as to be above the main entry of the arena and were built as part of the 2006 renovations, replacing the original floor-level retractable bleachers. The new seating also includes an elevator for disabled access and allows fans to look right into the penalty boxes for both the home and visiting teams.

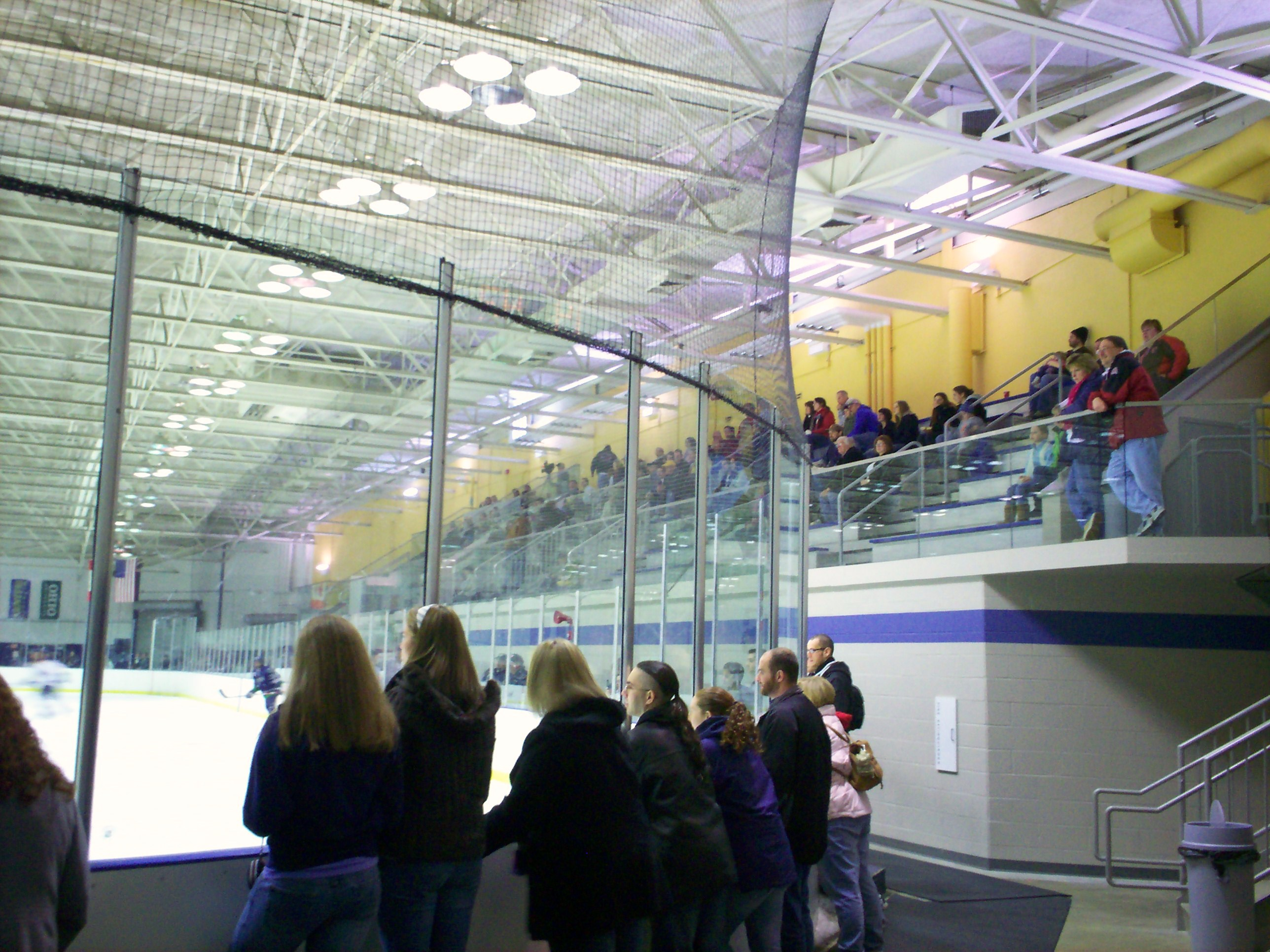
Elevated seating above penalty boxes.

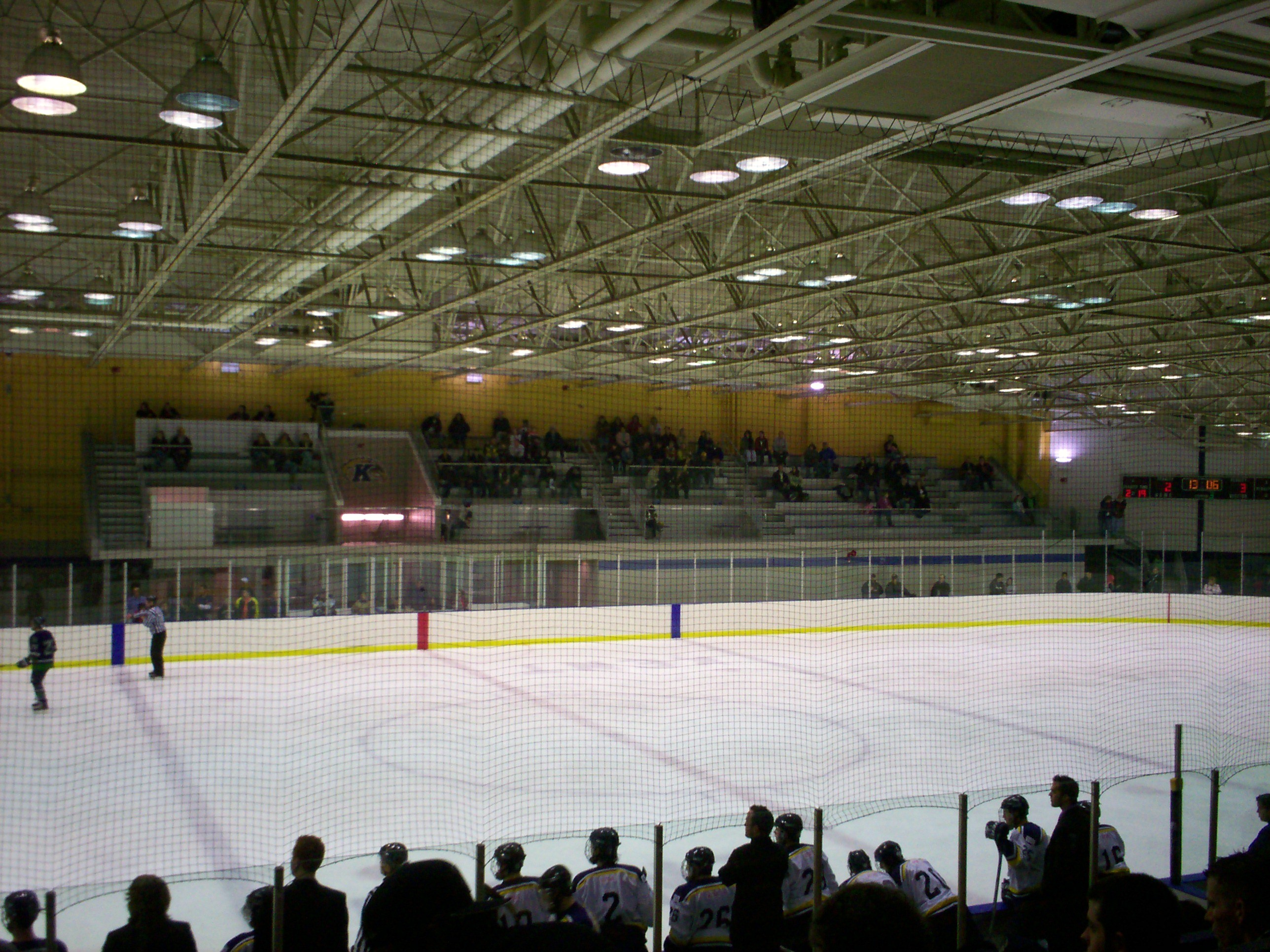
Elevated seating, part of the 2006 renovations.

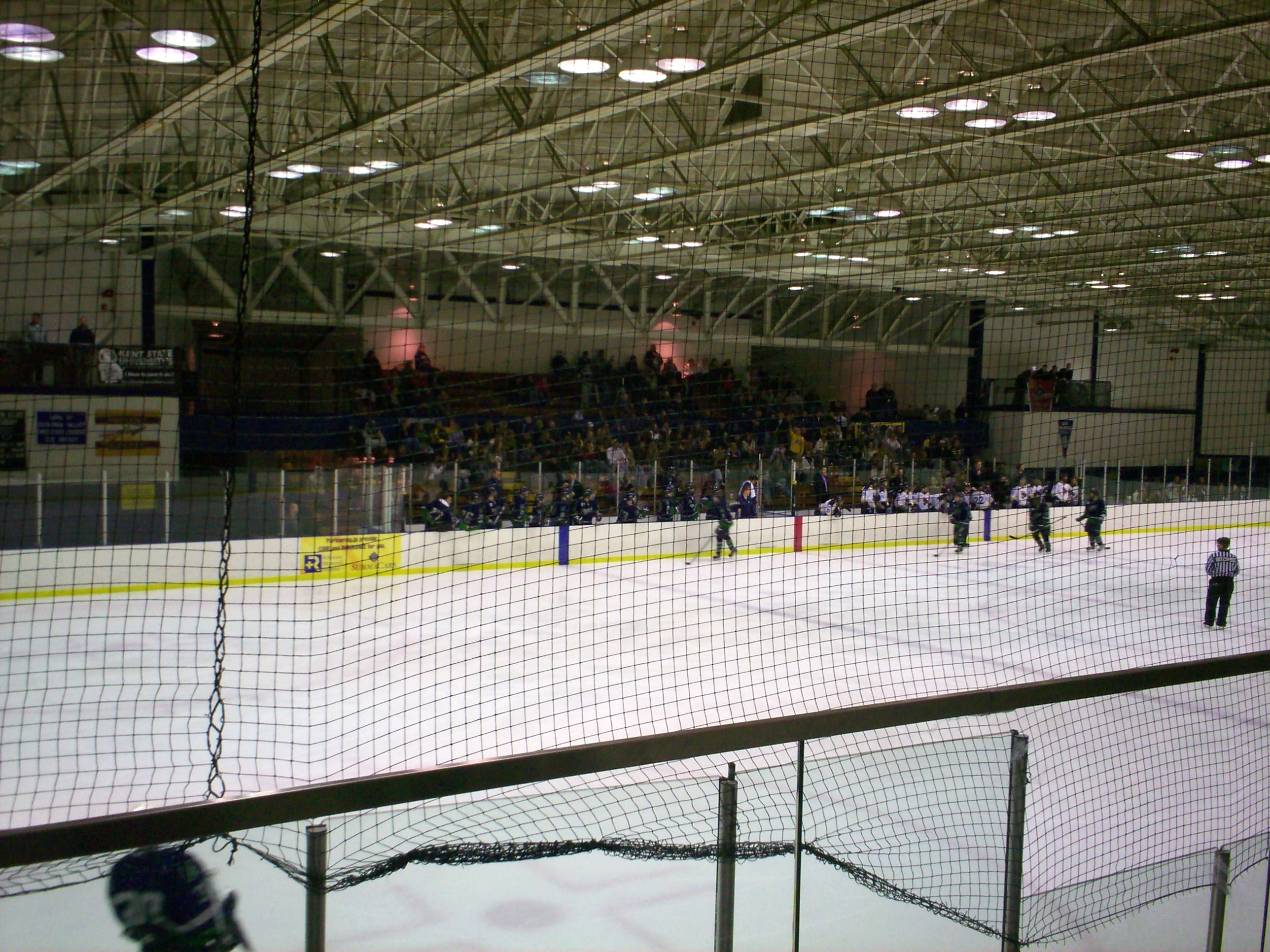
Bleacher seating and team benches.

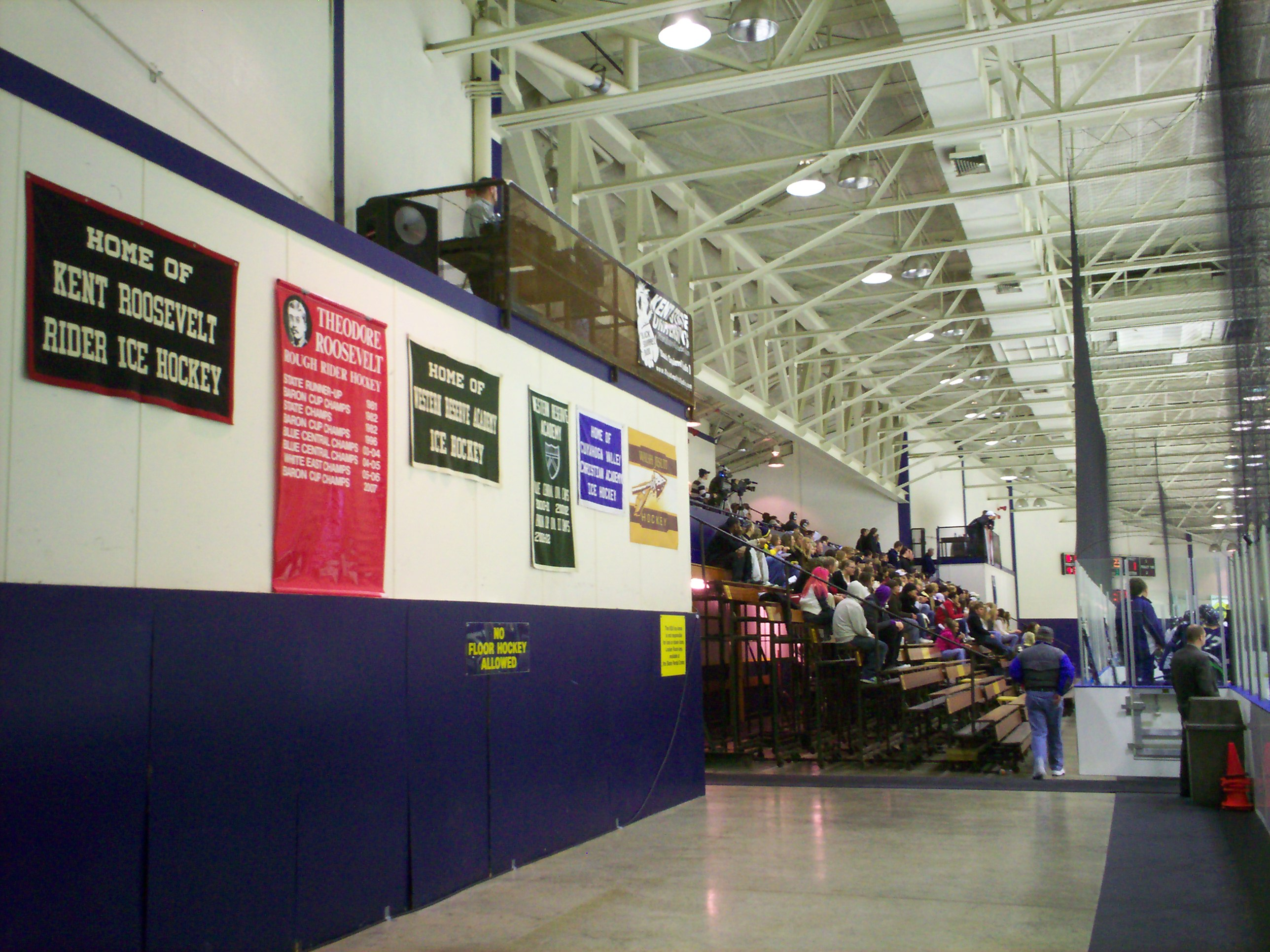
Bleacher seats, team benches, and high school banners.

== See also ==
- Kent State Golden Flashes
