= Lefty Smith =

American ice hockey player and coach

Biographical details
- Born: January 5, 1930; Saint Paul, Minnesota
- Died: January 3, 2012 (aged 81); South Bend, Indiana
- Education: University of St. Thomas

Playing career
- 1951–1952: Minneapolis Millers
- 1954–1955: St. Paul Saints
- 1956–1957: St. Paul Peters
- 1957–1958: St. Paul K.S.T.P.
- Position: Defenseman

Coaching career (HC unless noted)
- 1953–1958: South Saint Paul Secondary (assistant)
- 1958–1968: South Saint Paul Secondary
- 1968–1987: Notre Dame

Head coaching record
- Overall: 201–69–11 (high school); 285–314–30 (college)

Accomplishments and honors

Awards
- WCHA Coach of the Year (1973)

Charles 'Lefty' Smith (January 5, 1930 – January 3, 2012) was an American ice hockey player and coach most well known for his long tenure with Notre Dame.

== Career ==
A Saint Paul native, Smith spent four years at the nearby University of St. Thomas, playing both hockey and baseball. Smith graduated in 1951 and later returned to earn a master's in guidance and counseling but not before embarking on a short playing career.

In 1953 Smith began his coaching career as an assistant with South Saint Paul Secondary, his old high school. In 1958 he became the head coach of the Packers and spent the next decade leading the team. In that time he posted a record of 201–69–11. His success at the high school level caught the attention of the administration at Notre Dame who chose Smith to become the team's head coach when they rekindled the program in 1968.

Smith's arrival in South Bend coincided with the team becoming a sponsored sport. With Smith behind the bench the Fighting Irish got off to a fast start, going 16–8–3 in their first season and following it up with two good years before they were invited to join the WCHA. After a decent first year Smith led his team to a second-place finish in the powerhouse conference and was awarded the WCHA Coach of the Year for his efforts. In the remaining time the Fighting Irish spent in the WCHA they would typically finish in the lower half of the conference but were able to make the conference tournament each year until 1981. In 1981 Smith's Fighting Irish joined with three other WCHA schools and left to join the CCHA. Smith's squad provided a big surprise in their first season, finishing as the tournament runner-up and tying the team record for most wins in a season (23). After a poor result the following year it was revealed that the program was in jeopardy of ending without an immediate influx of cash. The program was demoted to club status for the 1983–84 season so players would be allowed to transfer without having to sit out a year. When the program returned it did so as an Independent but with reduced scholarships and no recruiting budget the team failed to accomplish much in Smith's final three seasons.

Smith retired as coach in 1987 but kept an office at Notre Dame for the remainder of his life. He died shortly before his 82nd birthday at his home in South Bend from natural causes.

== Head coaching record ==
=== College ===
Record table
Season	Team	Overall	Conference	Standing	Postseason
Notre Dame Fighting Irish Independent (1968–1971)
1968–69	Notre Dame	16–8–3			
1969–70	Notre Dame	21–8–1			
1970–71	Notre Dame	13–16–2			
Notre Dame:		50–32–6			
Notre Dame Fighting Irish (WCHA) (1971–1981)
1971–72	Notre Dame	14–20–0	10–16–0	t-8th	WCHA First Round
1972–73	Notre Dame	23–14–1	19–9–0	2nd	WCHA Second Round
1973–74	Notre Dame	14–20–2	11–16–1	8th	WCHA First Round
1974–75	Notre Dame	13–22–3	10–19–3	7th	WCHA First Round
1975–76	Notre Dame	19–17–2	15–15–2	5th	WCHA First Round
1976–77	Notre Dame	22–13–3	19–10–3	2nd	WCHA First Round
1977–78	Notre Dame	12–24–2	12–19–1	t-7th	WCHA First Round
1978–79	Notre Dame	18–19–1	17–14–1	5th	WCHA First Round
1979–80	Notre Dame	18–20–1	13–14–1	5th	WCHA Second Round
1980–81	Notre Dame	13–21–2	9–18–1	9th	
Notre Dame:		166–190–17	135–150–13		
Notre Dame Fighting Irish (CCHA) (1981–1983)
1981–82	Notre Dame	23–15–2	15–13–2	t-4th	CCHA Runner-Up
1982–83	Notre Dame	13–21–2	13–17–2	t-7th	CCHA Quarterfinals
Notre Dame:		36–36–4	28–30–4		
Notre Dame Fighting Irish (CSCHL) (1983–1984)
1983–84	Notre Dame	22–6–2			CSCHL Semifinals
Notre Dame:		22–6–2			
Notre Dame Fighting Irish Independent (1984–1987)
1984–85	Notre Dame	11–16–1			
1985–86	Notre Dame	12–21–1			
1986–87	Notre Dame	10–19–1			
Notre Dame:		33–56–3			
Total:		285–314–30†			
National champion Postseason invitational champion Conference regular season champion Conference regular season and conference tournament champion Division regular season champion Division regular season and conference tournament champion Conference tournament champion

†Total does not include the 1983–84 season because the team played under club status

Awards and achievements
Preceded by Jeff Sauer	WCHA Coach of the Year; 1972–73	Succeeded by Herb Brooks
Preceded by Sid Watson	Hobey Baker Legends of College Hockey Award; 2003	Succeeded by Ron Mason
