= 2013 CCHA men's ice hockey tournament =

2013 CCHA Men's ice hockey tournament
- 2013 CCHA Men's Ice Hockey Tournament logo
- Dates: March 8–24, 2013
- Teams: 11
- Finals site: Joe Louis Arena; Detroit, Michigan
- Champions: Notre Dame (3rd title)
- CCHA Men's Ice Hockey Tournaments

The 2013 CCHA Men's Ice Hockey Tournament was the 42nd Central Collegiate Hockey Association men's ice hockey tournament, and also the last for the original version of the conference. The tournament was played between March 8 and March 24, 2012, at campus locations and at Joe Louis Arena in Detroit, Michigan. The tournament was won by the Notre Dame Fighting Irish—winning the Mason Cup and earning the CCHA's automatic bid into the 2013 NCAA Division I Men's Ice Hockey Tournament.

The CCHA was revived in the 2021–22 season with eight members, and the tournament resumed at the end of that season.

== Format ==
The tournament featured four rounds of play. In the first round the sixth and eleventh, seventh and tenth, and eighth and ninth seeds as determined by the final regular season standings played a best-of-three series, with the winners advancing to the quarterfinals. There, the first seed and lowest-ranked first-round winner, the second seed and second-lowest-ranked first-round winner, the third seed and second-highest-ranked first-round winner, and the fourth seed and the fifth seed played a best-of-three series, with the winners advancing to the semifinals. In the semifinals, the highest and lowest seeds and second-highest and second-lowest seeds played a single game, with the winner advancing to the championship game.

=== Regular season standings ===
Note: GP = Games played; W = Wins; L = Losses; T = Ties; PTS = Points; GF = Goals For; GA = Goals Against

2012–13 Central Collegiate Hockey Association standings
	Conference record								Overall record					
	GP	W	L	T	SW	PTS	GF	GA	GP	W	L	T	GF	GA
#5 Miami †	28	17	7	4	4	59	75	50	42	25	12	5	106	73
#8 Notre Dame *	28	17	8	3	2	56	90	64	41	25	13	3	119	91
#16 Western Michigan	28	15	7	6	3	54	63	55	38	19	11	8	87	78
Ohio State	28	13	10	5	1	45	71	63	40	16	17	7	95	96
Ferris State	28	13	12	3	1	43	67	63	37	16	16	5	96	89
Alaska	28	12	13	3	1	40	73	79	37	17	16	4	95	97
#20 Michigan	28	10	15	3	3	36	81	96	40	18	19	3	129	130
Lake Superior State	28	11	16	1	1	35	65	77	39	17	21	1	92	109
Bowling Green	28	10	15	3	1	34	65	75	41	15	21	5	100	105
Northern Michigan	28	9	15	4	1	32	64	79	38	15	19	4	90	109
Michigan State	28	9	18	1	0	28	57	70	42	14	25	3	87	115
Championship: March 24, 2013 † indicates conference regular season champion; * indicates conference tournament champion Rankings: USCHO.com Top 20 Poll

== Bracket ==
First round March 8–10
6	Alaska	1	4	3
11	Michigan State	2*	1	4
7	Michigan	3	6	—
10	Northern Michigan	2	2	—
8	Lake Superior State	2	3	0
9	Bowling Green	0	6	7

Quarterfinals; March 15–17
1	Miami	0	4	4
11	Michigan State	3	1	1
4	Ohio State	2	3	3
5	Ferris State	4	1	2
3	Western Michigan	3	1	—
7	Michigan	4	5	—
2	Notre Dame	1*	4	—
9	Bowling Green	0	3	—

Semifinals; March 23
1	Miami	2
7	Michigan	6
2	Notre Dame	3
4	Ohio State	1

Championship; March 24
7	Michigan	1
2	Notre Dame	3

== Tournament awards ==
=== All-Tournament Team ===
- F T. J. Tynan* (Notre Dame)
- F Andrew Copp (Michigan)
- F Austin Wuthrich (Notre Dame)
- D Jacob Trouba (Michigan)
- D Stephen Johns (Notre Dame)
- G Steven Racine (Michigan)

* Most Valuable Player(s)
