= 1994 CCHA men's ice hockey tournament =

Sports tournament

1994 CCHA Men's ice hockey tournament
- Dates: March 11–20, 1994
- Teams: 12
- Finals site: Joe Louis Arena; Detroit, Michigan
- Champions: Michigan (1st title)
- Winning coach: Red Berenson (1st title)
- MVP: Mike Stone (Michigan)
- CCHA Men's Ice Hockey Tournaments

The 1994 CCHA Men's Ice Hockey Tournament was the 23rd CCHA Men's Ice Hockey Tournament. It was played between March 11 and March 20, 1994. First round games were played at campus sites, while second round and 'final four' games were played at Joe Louis Arena in Detroit, Michigan. By winning the tournament, Michigan received the Central Collegiate Hockey Association's automatic bid to the 1994 NCAA Division I Men's Ice Hockey Tournament.

== Format ==
The tournament featured four rounds of play. The teams that finished in the top six in conference standings were allowed to choose their opponents in descending order for the first round. Alaska–Fairbanks was an affiliate member and allowed to compete in the conference tournament as the lowest seed. The first seed chose to play the eleventh seed, the second seed chose to play the tenth seed, third seed chose to play the ninth seed, the fourth seed chose to play the eighth seed, the fifth seed chose to play the twelfth seed and the sixth seed played the seventh seed in best-of-three series, with the winners advancing to the second round. The highest two remaining seeds received byes into the semifinal round while the remaining four teams competing in single-game second round series. The highest and lowest non-advancing teams were matched against one another for one game while the remaining two teams competing in the other game. In the semifinals the higher automatic qualifier played the lower seed advancing from the second round while and second highest and second lowest seeds play each using single game to determine which teams advance to the finals. The tournament champion receives an automatic bid to the 1994 NCAA Division I Men's Ice Hockey Tournament.

== Conference standings ==
Note: GP = Games played; W = Wins; L = Losses; T = Ties; PTS = Points; GF = Goals For; GA = Goals Against

1993–94 Central Collegiate Hockey Association standings
| | Conference | | | | | | | Overall | | | | | |
| | GP | W | L | T | PTS | GF | GA | GP | W | L | T | GF | GA |
|---|---|---|---|---|---|---|---|---|---|---|---|---|---|
| Michigan†* | 30 | 24 | 5 | 1 | 49 | 146 | 80 | 41 | 33 | 7 | 1 | 205 | 112 |
| Lake Superior State | 30 | 18 | 8 | 4 | 40 | 129 | 69 | 45 | 31 | 10 | 4 | 198 | 103 |
| Michigan State | 30 | 17 | 8 | 5 | 39 | 115 | 87 | 41 | 23 | 13 | 5 | 155 | 123 |
| Western Michigan | 30 | 18 | 10 | 2 | 38 | 117 | 101 | 40 | 24 | 13 | 3 | 165 | 134 |
| Miami | 30 | 17 | 12 | 1 | 35 | 112 | 94 | 38 | 21 | 16 | 1 | 137 | 120 |
| Bowling Green | 30 | 15 | 13 | 2 | 32 | 114 | 105 | 38 | 19 | 17 | 2 | 149 | 132 |
| Ferris State | 30 | 12 | 17 | 1 | 25 | 110 | 122 | 38 | 14 | 23 | 1 | 205 | 247 |
| Notre Dame | 30 | 9 | 16 | 5 | 23 | 85 | 121 | 38 | 11 | 22 | 5 | 113 | 165 |
| Illinois-Chicago | 30 | 8 | 20 | 2 | 18 | 101 | 144 | 39 | 11 | 26 | 2 | 135 | 192 |
| Ohio State | 30 | 6 | 19 | 5 | 17 | 81 | 124 | 35 | 7 | 23 | 5 | 98 | 158 |
| Kent State | 30 | 6 | 22 | 2 | 14 | 109 | 172 | 39 | 11 | 26 | 2 | 151 | 219 |
| Alaska-Fairbanks^ | | | | | | | | 38 | 24 | 13 | 1 | 223 | 152 |
Championship: Michigan † indicates conference regular season champion * indicates conference tournament champion^ Alaska-Fairbanks is an affiliate member and its games do not count towards the conference standings

== Bracket ==
First Round; March 11–13
1 | Michigan | 5* | 10 | –
11 | Kent State | 4 | 3 | –
2 | Lake Superior State | 5 | 8 | –
10 | Ohio State | 1 | 0 | –
3 | Michigan State | 3 | 2* | 8
9 | Illinois–Chicago | 4 | 1 | 3
4 | Western Michigan | 6 | 7 | –
8 | Notre Dame | 3 | 1 | –
5 | Miami | 5 | 1 | 4
12 | Alaska–Fairbanks | 3 | 6 | 3
6 | Bowling Green | 3 | 3* | –
7 | Ferris State | 0 | 2 | –

Second Round; March 17
4 | Western Michigan | 4
5 | Miami | 3
3 | Michigan State | 3*
6 | Bowling Green | 2

Semifinals; March 18
1 | Michigan | 6
4 | Western Michigan | 4
2 | Lake Superior State | 4
3 | Michigan State | 0

Championship; March 20
1 | Michigan | 3
2 | Lake Superior State | 0

Note: * denotes overtime period(s)

=== First round ===
==== (1) Michigan vs. (11) Kent State ====
| Michigan | 5 – 4 | OT | Kent State | Yost Ice Arena |

| Michigan | 10 – 3 | Kent State | Yost Ice Arena |

| Michigan won series 2–0 |

==== (2) Lake Superior State vs. (10) Ohio State ====
| Lake Superior State | 5 – 0 | Ohio State | Taffy Abel Arena |

| Lake Superior State | 8 – 0 | Ohio State | Taffy Abel Arena |

| Lake Superior State won series 2–0 |

==== (3) Michigan State vs. (9) Illinois–Chicago ====
| Michigan State | 3 – 4 | Illinois–Chicago | Munn Ice Arena |

| Michigan State | 2 – 1 | OT | Illinois–Chicago | Munn Ice Arena |

| Michigan State | 8 – 3 | Illinois–Chicago | Munn Ice Arena |

| Michigan State won series 2–1 |

==== (4) Western Michigan vs. (8) Notre Dame ====
| Western Michigan | 6 – 3 | Notre Dame | Lawson Arena |

| Western Michigan | 7 – 1 | Notre Dame | Lawson Arena |

| Western Michigan won series 2–0 |

==== (5) Miami vs. (12) Alaska–Fairbanks ====
| Miami | 5 – 3 | Alaska–Fairbanks | Goggin Ice Arena |

| Miami | 1 – 6 | Alaska–Fairbanks | Goggin Ice Arena |

| Miami | 4 – 3 | Alaska–Fairbanks | Goggin Ice Arena |

| Miami won series 2–1 |

==== (6) Bowling Green vs. (7) Ferris State ====
| Bowling Green | 3 – 0 | Ferris State | BGSU Ice Arena |

| Bowling Green | 3 – 2 | OT | Ferris State | BGSU Ice Arena |

| Bowling Green won series 2–0 |

=== Second round ===
==== (3) Michigan State vs. (6) Bowling Green ====
| March 17 | Michigan State | 3 – 2 | OT | Bowling Green | Joe Louis Arena |

==== (4) Western Michigan vs. (5) Miami ====
| March 17 | Western Michigan | 4 – 3 | Miami | Joe Louis Arena |

=== Semifinals ===
==== (1) Michigan vs. (4) Western Michigan ====
| March 18 | Michigan | 6 – 4 | Western Michigan | Joe Louis Arena | Recap |
| (Hilton, Legg) Ryan Sittler - PP - 04:20 (Stone, Frescoln) John Madden - 17:45 | | First period | 07:25 - Brendan Kenny (Mayers); 12:23 - PP - Chris Brooks (Brekke, Innanen) |
| No scoring | | Second period | No scoring |
| (Stone, Halko) Warren Luhning - SH - 10:56 (unassisted) Brendan Morrison - SH - 11:28 (Madden, Schock) Mike Legg - GW - 13:12 (unassisted) Jason Botterill - EN - 19:49 | | Third period | 18:43 - Colin Ward (Mayers); 19:44 - Jamal Mayers (Brooks, Gallentine) |
| ( 19 saves / 23 shots ) Steve Shields | | Goalie stats | Craig Brown ( 38 saves / 43 shots ) |

==== (2) Lake Superior State vs. (3) Michigan State ====
| March 18 | Lake Superior State | 4 – 0 | Michigan State | Joe Louis Arena |

=== Championship ===
==== (1) Michigan vs. (2) Lake Superior State ====
| March 20 | Michigan | 3 – 0 | Lake Superior State | Joe Louis Arena | Recap |
| (unassisted) Brian Wiseman - GW - 16:18 | | First period | No scoring |
| (Madden, Legg) Mike Stone - 03:18 | | Second period | No scoring |
| (unassisted) Ryan Sittler - 10:43 | | Third period | No scoring |
| ( 15 saves / 15 shots ) Steve Shields | | Goalie stats | Blaine Lacher ( 21 saves / 24 shots ) |

== Tournament awards ==
=== All-Tournament Team ===
- F Mike Stone* (Michigan)
- F Brian Wiseman (Michigan)
- F Steve Guolla (Michigan State)
- D Blake Sloan (Michigan)
- D Steven Halko (Michigan)
- G Blaine Lacher (Lake Superior State)

* Most Valuable Player(s)
