= 1993 CCHA men's ice hockey tournament =

Sports tournament

1993 CCHA Men's ice hockey tournament
- Dates: March 12–21, 1993
- Teams: 12
- Finals site: Joe Louis Arena; Detroit, Michigan
- Champions: Lake Superior State (3rd title)
- Winning coach: Jeff Jackson (3rd title)
- MVP: Blaine Lacher (Lake Superior State)
- CCHA Men's Ice Hockey Tournaments

The 1993 CCHA Men's Ice Hockey Tournament was the 22nd CCHA Men's Ice Hockey Tournament. It was played between March 12 and March 21, 1993. First-round games were played at campus sites, while second-round and 'final four' games were played at Joe Louis Arena in Detroit, Michigan. By winning the tournament, Lake Superior State received the Central Collegiate Hockey Association's automatic bid to the 1993 NCAA Division I Men's Ice Hockey Tournament.

== Format ==
The tournament featured four rounds of play. The teams that finished in the top six in conference standings were allowed to choose their opponents in descending order for the first round. Alaska–Fairbanks was an affiliate member and allowed to compete in the conference tournament as the lowest seed. The first seed chose to play the eleventh seed, the second seed chose to play the tenth seed, third seed chose to play the ninth seed, the fourth seed chose to play the eighth seed, the fifth seed chose to play the seventh seed and the sixth seed played the twelfth seed in best-of-three series, with the winners advancing to the second round. The highest two remaining seeds received byes into the semifinal round while the remaining four teams competing in single-game second-round series. The highest and lowest non-advancing teams were matched against one another for one game while the remaining two teams competing in the other game. In the semifinals the higher automatic qualifier played the lower seed advancing from the second round while and second-highest and second-lowest seeds played each in a single game to determine which teams advanced to the finals. The tournament champion received an automatic bid to the 1993 NCAA Division I Men's Ice Hockey Tournament.

== Conference standings ==
Note: GP = Games played; W = Wins; L = Losses; T = Ties; PTS = Points; GF = Goals For; GA = Goals Against

1992–93 Central Collegiate Hockey Association standings
	Conference							Overall					
	GP	W	L	T	PTS	GF	GA	GP	W	L	T	GF	GA
Miami†	30	22	3	5	49	150	88	41	27	9	5	189	126
Michigan	30	23	5	2	48	180	71	40	30	7	3	238	95
Lake Superior State*	30	20	5	5	45	147	91	45	32	8	5	220	125
Michigan State	30	18	10	2	38	128	98	40	24	14	2	169	127
Western Michigan	30	17	11	2	36	118	117	38	20	16	2	147	150
Ferris State	30	13	13	4	30	103	118	41	21	16	4	162	141
Bowling Green	30	12	17	1	25	121	132	41	19	21	1	169	180
Kent State	30	10	19	1	21	118	148	38	13	22	3	150	181
Illinois-Chicago	30	8	20	2	18	100	134	37	10	25	2	122	170
Notre Dame	30	5	23	2	12	87	144	36	7	27	2	102	181
Ohio State	30	3	25	2	8	74	144	37	5	30	2	94	221
Alaska-Fairbanks^								37	23	12	2	204	127
Championship: Lake Superior State † indicates conference regular season champion * indicates conference tournament champion^ Alaska-Fairbanks is an affiliate member and its games do not count towards the conference standings

== Bracket ==
First Round; March 12–14
1	Miami	8	7	–
11	Ohio State	2	2	–
2	Michigan	13	8	–
10	Notre Dame	2	1	–
3	Lake Superior State	7	4	–
9	Illinois–Chicago	2	2	–
4	Michigan State	6	5	–
8	Kent State	5	2	–
5	Western Michigan	4	3	–
7	Bowling Green	5	6	–
6	Ferris State	8	7	–
12	Alaska–Fairbanks	6	2	–

Second Round; March 17
4	Michigan State	2
6	Ferris State	3
3	Lake Superior State	7
7	Bowling Green	1

Semifinals; March 18
1	Miami	4*
6	Ferris State	3
2	Michigan	3
3	Lake Superior State	5

Championship; March 20
1	Miami	0
3	Lake Superior State	3

Note: * denotes overtime period(s)

=== First round ===
==== (1) Miami vs. (11) Ohio State ====
Miami	8 – 2	Ohio State	Goggin Ice Arena

Miami	7 – 2	Ohio State	Goggin Ice Arena

Miami won series 2–0

==== (2) Michigan vs. (10) Notre Dame ====
Michigan	13 – 2	Notre Dame	Yost Ice Arena

Michigan	8 – 1	Notre Dame	Yost Ice Arena

Michigan won series 2–0

==== (3) Lake Superior State vs. (9) Illinois–Chicago ====
Lake Superior State	7 – 2	Illinois–Chicago	Taffy Abel Arena

Lake Superior State	4 – 2	Illinois–Chicago	Taffy Abel Arena

Lake Superior State won series 2–0

==== (4) Michigan State vs. (8) Kent State ====
Michigan State	6 – 5	Kent State	Munn Ice Arena

Michigan State	5 – 2	Kent State	Munn Ice Arena

Michigan State won series 2–0

==== (5) Western Michigan vs. (7) Bowling Green ====
Western Michigan	4 – 5	Bowling Green	Lawson Arena

Western Michigan	3 – 6	Bowling Green	Lawson Arena

Bowling Green won series 2–0

==== (6) Ferris State vs. (12) Alaska–Fairbanks ====
Ferris State	8 – 6	Alaska–Fairbanks	Ewigleben Arena

Ferris State	7 – 2	Alaska–Fairbanks	Ewigleben Arena

Ferris State won series 2–0

=== Second round ===
==== (3) Lake Superior State vs. (7) Bowling Green ====
March 18	Lake Superior State	7 – 1	Bowling Green	Joe Louis Arena

==== (4) Michigan State vs. (6) Ferris State ====
March 18	Michigan State	2 – 3	Ferris State	Joe Louis Arena

=== Semifinals ===
==== (1) Miami vs. (6) Ferris State ====
March 19	Miami	4 – 3	OT	Ferris State	Joe Louis Arena

==== (2) Michigan vs. (3) Lake Superior State ====
March 19	Michigan	3 – 5	Lake Superior State	Joe Louis Arena

=== Championship ===
==== (1) Miami vs. (3) Lake Superior State ====
March 21	Miami	0 – 3	Lake Superior State	Joe Louis Arena

== Tournament awards ==
=== All-Tournament Team ===
- F Brian Rolston (Lake Superior State)
- F Wayne Strachan (Lake Superior State)
- F Rob Valicevic (Lake Superior State)
- D Bob Marshall (Miami)
- D Michael Smith (Lake Superior State)
- G Blaine Lacher* (Lake Superior State)

* Most Valuable Player(s)
