= 1993–94 Lake Superior State Lakers men's ice hockey season =

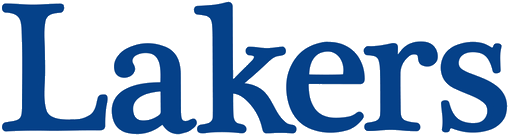

National champion CCHA tournament, champion NCAA tournament, champion
- Conference: 2nd CCHA
- Home ice: Norris Center

Record
- Overall: 31–10–4
- Conference: 18–8–4
- Home: 10–4–3
- Road: 13–5–1
- Neutral: 8–1–0

Coaches and captains
- Head coach: Jeff Jackson
- Assistant coaches: Paul Pooley; Ron Rolston; Joe Shawhan
- Captain: Clayton Beddoes
- Alternate captain(s): Jay Ness; Mike Morin; Steve Barnes

The 1993–94 Lake Superior State Lakers men's ice hockey team represented the Lake Superior State University in college ice hockey. In its 4th year under head coach Jeff Jackson the team compiled a 31–10–4 record and reached the NCAA tournament for the eighth time. The Lakers defeated Boston University 9–1 to win the championship game at the Saint Paul Civic Center in Saint Paul, Minnesota.

== Season ==
After coming up just shy of defending their national title Lake Superior was hoping to keep their recent success going. While they lost leading scorer Brian Rolston to the pros, the Lakers returned their next five point-getters and fielded a team full of players who had made consecutive deep runs in the NCAA tournament.

=== Middling start ===
The Lakers began the season with four wins against conference opponents but when they hosted the class of the CCHA, Michigan, in early November Lake State suffered its first loss of the year. Worryingly, the next night against Bowling Green also ended in a loss for the Lakers, who had built their success under Jeff Jackson by being neatly unbeatable at home. After a pair of road wins Lake Superior could only manage a home split against Notre Dame who was still recovering from nearly losing their program a decade earlier. Lake Superior ended the first half of their conference schedule with a loss at Michigan State, dropping to 7–4 and looking like a shadow of the team that had been 20 minutes away from a national championship eight months earlier.

=== Tournament season ===
The Lakers headed to Alaska to participate in the Great Alaska Face–Off, a tournament held by Alaska–Fairbanks. Unlike most in-season tournaments each team would play one another and the tournament champion would be the team who finished with the most points. Despite having played just two days prior and having to deal with the jetlag from the 3,500 mile journey, the Lakers swept through the competition, winning each game and winning the second iteration of the tournament.

lake Superior got two full weeks to recover from the trip before they hit the ice again and they continued their winning streak with another pair of road wins. After splitting a road series the Lakers got another week off before they headed to Minneapolis for the Mariucci Classic. Lake Superior began with the long-awaited rematch against Maine and got a small measure of revenge with a 2–1 win. LSSU then battled Minnesota for the tournament title and required double overtime to decide the winner but when the dust settled it was Lake Superior who held the crown.

=== Sliding ===
Lake Superior barely got a breather after the arduous tournament before they were thrown back into the fire. The Lakers headed to Michigan to take on a Wolverine team that was thus far undefeated in conference play. Lake State fought valiantly in the first game, narrowly missing with a 3–4 loss in overtime but after Michigan's win in the second game Lake Superior had dropped to 9–6 in the CCHA, 13 points behind the Wolverines. After recovering with three points against Ohio State the Lakers against suffered a home split then played three overtime games in a week that ended with mediocre results.

=== Recovery ===
The Lakers got the first week of February off and when they returned to game action that were already out of the running for the conference championship (with 8 games still to play). One bright spot, however, was that Michigan had been so dominant against the CCHA that the three losses Lake State suffered were mirrored by their competition for the 2nd-seed. The Lakers began their final stretch against Michigan State, who they had to beat if they wanted a top seed, and they blitzed the Spartans with a surprising 11–1 win. LSSU earned three points in the series after tying the second game then captured another three points to pull into a tie for third with Western Michigan.

With the Spartans 2 points ahead with 4 games to play, the Lakers' couldn't have asked for a better schedule than to play Illinois–Chicago and Kent State in consecutive weekends. While the team knew they should beat their weak competition, how they performed was miraculous nonetheless. Up to that point in the season senior starter Blaine Lacher had had a good season but he finally earned his first shutout of the year against UIC. After Lacher allowed only one goal in the rematch the Lakers found themselves in a tie for second with the Broncos after Michigan State's disastrous weekend. Lacher continued his hot streak by shutting out Kent State in consecutive games and after Western Michigan failed to keep pace the Lakers ended the season with a 2nd-place CCHA finish.

=== CCHA tournament ===
Lake Superior's reward was facing 10th-seed Ohio State in the first round and bye into the semifinal should they win. The Buckeyes proved they were no match for the Lakers when they failed to score in wither of the two games, allowing Lacher to run his shutout streak almost to 300 minutes, a new program record. The quarterfinal bye allowed the Lakers to rest while MSU got in a dogfight with Miami and when the two met the Spartans couldn't beat Lacher who posted his fifth consecutive shutout and was approaching the all-time NCAA shutout record.

Lacher and the Lakers faced a tall task in the conference title game against Michigan and at least early on it appeared that they might have a chance for both the title and the record. However, just after his 375th minute of scoreless play, Lacher finally surrendered a goal and the near-miss to the record seemed to deflate the team. Lake Superior could only muster 15 shots against a ferocious Wolverine defense and the Lakers fell 0–3, ending their three-year reign as CCHA tournament champions.

=== NCAA tournament ===
Despite catching fire at the end of the season Lake Superior only received the 4th western seed and would have to face Michigan in the regional semifinals. That game, however, could only happen if the Lakers could get past Northeastern. The Huskies hadn't played well to end the season but they were still able to put up a fight against Lake Superior, scoring five times and pushing LSSU into their 11th overtime game of the season. Lake Superior had lost as many extra-session games as they had won to that point but they were able to get above .500 and advance to the second round.

Lake Superior wrapped up their stay in East Lansing against the only CCHA team they hadn't defeated all year. The fifth meeting between the two looked like it was going to go the same way as the first four when Michigan opened the scoring 9 minutes in but Lake State responded by scoring three times in just over three minutes to give themselves a 2-goal edge after the first. The Wolverines recovered in the third and methodically took over, firing 20 shots at Lacher and scoring three times to retake the lead but a goal by Kurt Miller, with just 3 seconds left in the second period, tied the score at 4-all. The Laker goal seemed to sap the energy from the Wolverines and the two teams played the final frame a bit more evenly. Neither was able to score and the two teams headed into overtime. Both teams appeared nervous at the start with only one shot being recorded in the first two and a half minutes, but when Rob Valicevic got the first Laker shot of the session it ended up in the back of the net and the Lakers had landed their white whale.

The Lakers headed to Saint Paul for a meeting with Harvard. Lake State's third game of the tournament ended in much the same manner as the first two with overtime being needed but team captain Clayton Beddoes' goal just past the 4-minute mark sent Lake Superior to its third consecutive championship game. The three nail-biting finishes had left their mark on the team with Jeff Jackson downing Tums and Blaine Lacher finding hair coming off in his mask.

Their final game came against the top eastern seed, Boston University, and they were expecting to weather a storm from the favored Terriers who had outscored opponents by more than 40 goals in the first period alone that season. Instead, it was the Lakers who got off to a hot start with one goal in the first period to BU's none. The score might have been a surprise but what was truly shocking was how poorly Boston University had played; the Terriers had only been able to muster 2 shots on goal in the first 20 minutes, and that didn't bode well for their chances. When Kurt Miller put the Lakers' up 3–0 the shot chart read 21–3 in the Lakers favor. BU did score in the second period but by then the route was on and Lake Superior ended up scoring nine goals from seven different players. The 9–1 win was the largest margin of victory and most goals scored by one team since 1961. More importantly was that Lake Superior finally got a national championship without a cloud of controversy hanging over the victory.

=== Awards and honors ===
Sean Tallaire received the tournament MOP on the back of his two goals but the award could have gone to any number of Laker players with their dominating performance. Tallaire was joined by Blaine Lacher, Keith Aldridge, Steve Barnes and Clayton Beddoes on the All-Tournament team, tying the record for the most players by one team in a season. Blaine Lacher finished with a program-record 1.98 goals against average and 6 shutouts on the season (still program bests as of 2019) but his heroics went unrecognized by award voters as only Beddoes made the AHCA West second-team. Even in their conference the Lakers could only manage two All-CCHA Second Team nods (garnered by Beddoes and Aldridge) but in the end the national championship made up for any slights.

The 1993–94 Lakers became only the second national champion to play more road games than home games during the season (1977–78 Boston University).

== Standings ==
1993–94 Central Collegiate Hockey Association standings
| | Conference | | | | | | | Overall | | | | | |
| | GP | W | L | T | PTS | GF | GA | GP | W | L | T | GF | GA |
|---|---|---|---|---|---|---|---|---|---|---|---|---|---|
| Michigan†* | 30 | 24 | 5 | 1 | 49 | 146 | 80 | 41 | 33 | 7 | 1 | 205 | 112 |
| Lake Superior State | 30 | 18 | 8 | 4 | 40 | 129 | 69 | 45 | 31 | 10 | 4 | 198 | 103 |
| Michigan State | 30 | 17 | 8 | 5 | 39 | 115 | 87 | 41 | 23 | 13 | 5 | 155 | 123 |
| Western Michigan | 30 | 18 | 10 | 2 | 38 | 117 | 101 | 40 | 24 | 13 | 3 | 165 | 134 |
| Miami | 30 | 17 | 12 | 1 | 35 | 112 | 94 | 38 | 21 | 16 | 1 | 137 | 120 |
| Bowling Green | 30 | 15 | 13 | 2 | 32 | 114 | 105 | 38 | 19 | 17 | 2 | 149 | 132 |
| Ferris State | 30 | 12 | 17 | 1 | 25 | 110 | 122 | 38 | 14 | 23 | 1 | 205 | 247 |
| Notre Dame | 30 | 9 | 16 | 5 | 23 | 85 | 121 | 38 | 11 | 22 | 5 | 113 | 165 |
| Illinois-Chicago | 30 | 8 | 20 | 2 | 18 | 101 | 144 | 39 | 11 | 26 | 2 | 135 | 192 |
| Ohio State | 30 | 6 | 19 | 5 | 17 | 81 | 124 | 35 | 7 | 23 | 5 | 98 | 158 |
| Kent State | 30 | 6 | 22 | 2 | 14 | 109 | 172 | 39 | 11 | 26 | 2 | 151 | 219 |
| Alaska-Fairbanks^ | | | | | | | | 38 | 24 | 13 | 1 | 223 | 152 |
Championship: Michigan † indicates conference regular season champion * indicates conference tournament champion^ Alaska-Fairbanks is an affiliate member and its games do not count towards the conference standings

== Schedule ==
| Date | Opponent^{#} | Rank^{#} | Site | Result | Record |
Regular season
| October 22 | vs. Miami | | Norris Center • Sault Ste. Marie, Michigan | W 6–2 | 1–0 (1–0) |
| October 23 | vs. Miami | | Norris Center • Sault Ste. Marie, Michigan | W 3–2 | 2–0 (2–0) |
| October 29 | at Ferris State | | Ewigleben Arena • Big Rapids, Michigan | W 4–1 | 3–0 (3–0) |
| October 30 | at Ferris State | | Ewigleben Arena • Big Rapids, Michigan | W 9–2 | 4–0 (4–0) |
| November 5 | vs. Michigan | | Norris Center • Sault Ste. Marie, Michigan | L 2–4 | 4–1 (4–1) |
| November 6 | vs. Bowling Green | | Norris Center • Sault Ste. Marie, Michigan | L 2–3 | 4–2 (4–2) |
| November 12 | at Miami | | Goggin Ice Arena • Oxford, Ohio | W 6–0 | 5–2 (5–2) |
| November 13 | at Ohio State | | OSU Ice Rink • Columbus, Ohio | W 4–1 | 6–2 (6–2) |
| November 19 | vs. Notre Dame | | Norris Center • Sault Ste. Marie, Michigan | L 4–5 ^{OT} | 6–3 (6–3) |
| November 20 | vs. Notre Dame | | Norris Center • Sault Ste. Marie, Michigan | W 6–1 | 7–3 (7–3) |
| November 23 | at Michigan State | | Munn Ice Arena • East Lansing, Michigan | L 4–6 | 7–4 (7–4) |
Great Alaska Face–Off
| November 25 | at Alaska–Fairbanks* | | Carlson Center • Fairbanks, Alaska (Great Alaska Face-Off) | W 7–4 | 8–4 (7–4) |
| November 26 | vs. Michigan Tech* | | Carlson Center • Fairbanks, Alaska (Great Alaska Face-Off) | W 4–3 | 9–4 (7–4) |
| November 27 | vs. Notre Dame* | | Carlson Center • Fairbanks, Alaska (Great Alaska Face-Off) | W 2–1 | 10–4 (7–4) |
| December 10 | at Notre Dame | | Edmund P. Joyce Center • Notre Dame, Indiana | W 2–1 ^{OT} | 11–4 (8–4) |
| December 11 | at Illinois–Chicago | | UIC Pavilion • Chicago, Illinois | W 4–1 | 12–4 (9–4) |
| December 15 | at Michigan Tech* | | MacInnes Student Ice Arena • Houghton, Michigan | W 8–2 | 13–4 (9–4) |
| December 17 | at Michigan Tech* | | MacInnes Student Ice Arena • Houghton, Michigan | L 2–5 | 13–5 (9–4) |
Mariucci Classic
| December 31 | vs. Maine* | | Mariucci Arena • Minneapolis, Minnesota (Mariucci Semifinal) | W 2–1 | 14–5 (9–4) |
| January 1 | at Minnesota* | | Mariucci Arena • Minneapolis, Minnesota (Mariucci championship) | W 4–3 ^{2OT} | 15–5 (9–4) |
| January 7 | at Michigan | | Yost Ice Arena • Ann Arbor, Michigan | L 3–4 ^{OT} | 15–6 (9–5) |
| January 8 | at Michigan | | Yost Ice Arena • Ann Arbor, Michigan | L 2–5 | 15–7 (9–6) |
| January 14 | vs. Ohio State | | Norris Center • Sault Ste. Marie, Michigan | T 3–3 ^{OT} | 15–7–1 (9–6–1) |
| January 15 | vs. Ohio State | | Norris Center • Sault Ste. Marie, Michigan | W 4–1 | 16–7–1 (10–6–1) |
| January 21 | at Bowling Green | | BGSU Ice Arena • Bowling Green, Ohio | L 4–5 | 16–8–1 (10–7–1) |
| January 22 | at Bowling Green | | BGSU Ice Arena • Bowling Green, Ohio | W 6–1 | 17–8–1 (11–7–1) |
| January 25 | vs. Ferris State | | Norris Center • Sault Ste. Marie, Michigan | T 2–2 ^{OT} | 17–8–2 (11–7–2) |
| January 28 | vs. Western Michigan | | Norris Center • Sault Ste. Marie, Michigan | L 3–4 ^{OT} | 17–9–2 (11–8–2) |
| January 29 | vs. Kent State | | Norris Center • Sault Ste. Marie, Michigan | W 6–5 ^{OT} | 18–9–2 (12–8–2) |
| February 11 | vs. Michigan State | | Norris Center • Sault Ste. Marie, Michigan | W 11–1 | 19–9–2 (13–8–2) |
| February 12 | vs. Michigan State | | Norris Center • Sault Ste. Marie, Michigan | T 3–3 ^{OT} | 19–9–3 (13–8–3) |
| February 18 | at Western Michigan | | Lawson Arena • Kalamazoo, Michigan | T 2–2 ^{OT} | 19–9–4 (13–8–4) |
| February 19 | at Western Michigan | | Lawson Arena • Kalamazoo, Michigan | W 5–3 | 20–9–4 (14–8–4) |
| February 25 | vs. Illinois–Chicago | | Norris Center • Sault Ste. Marie, Michigan | W 3–0 | 21–9–4 (15–8–4) |
| February 26 | vs. Illinois–Chicago | | Norris Center • Sault Ste. Marie, Michigan | W 6–1 | 22–9–4 (16–8–4) |
| March 4 | at Kent State | | KSU Ice Arena • Kent, Ohio | W 4–0 | 23–9–4 (17–8–4) |
| March 5 | at Kent State | | KSU Ice Arena • Kent, Ohio | W 7–0 | 24–9–4 (18–8–4) |
CCHA tournament
| March 11 | vs. Ohio State* | | Norris Center • Sault Ste. Marie, Michigan (CCHA Quarterfinal game 1) | W 5–0 | 25–9–4 (18–8–4) |
| March 12 | vs. Ohio State* | | Norris Center • Sault Ste. Marie, Michigan (CCHA Quarterfinal game 2) | W 8–0 | 26–9–4 (18–8–4) |
Lake Superior State Won Series 2-0
| March 19 | vs. Michigan State* | | Joe Louis Arena • Detroit, Michigan (CCHA Semifinal) | W 4–0 | 27–9–4 (18–8–4) |
| March 20 | vs. Michigan* | | Joe Louis Arena • Detroit, Michigan (CCHA championship) | L 0–3 | 27–10–4 (18–8–4) |
NCAA tournament
| March 26 | vs. Northeastern* | | Munn Ice Arena • East Lansing, Michigan (West Regional Quarterfinal) | W 6–5 ^{OT} | 28–10–4 (18–8–4) |
| March 27 | vs. Michigan* | | Munn Ice Arena • East Lansing, Michigan (West Regional semifinal) | W 5–4 ^{OT} | 29–10–4 (18–8–4) |
| March 31 | vs. Harvard* | | Saint Paul Civic Center • Saint Paul, Minnesota (National semifinal) | W 3–2 ^{OT} | 30–10–4 (18–8–4) |
| April 2 | vs. Boston University* | | Saint Paul Civic Center • Saint Paul, Minnesota (National championship) | W 9–1 | 31–10–4 (18–8–4) |
*Non-conference game. ^{#}Rankings from USCHO.com Poll. Source:

== Roster ==
| No. | Nat. | Player | Class | Pos | Height | Weight | DoB | Hometown | Previous team | NHL rights |
|---|---|---|---|---|---|---|---|---|---|---|
| 1 | (United States) | Paul Sass | Sophomore | G | 5' 9" (1.75 m) | 161 lb (73 kg) | 1973-04-02 | Fenton, Michigan | Des Moines Buccaneers (USHL) | — |
| 2 | (United States) | Josh Bilben | Freshman | D | | | 1972-09-23 | Soldotna, Alaska | | — |
| 3 | (Canada) | Steve Barnes (A) | Senior | D | 5' 11" (1.8 m) | 190 lb (86 kg) | 1970-07-19 | Gravenhurst, Ontario | Orillia Terriers (OJHL) | — |
| 4 | (United States) | Keith Aldridge | Sophomore | D | 5' 11" (1.8 m) | 180 lb (82 kg) | 1973-07-20 | Detroit, Michigan | Rochester Mustangs (USHL) | — |
| 5 | (Canada) | Ryan Sharpe | Freshman | D | 5' 11" (1.8 m) | 180 lb (82 kg) | 1973-05-08 | Kenora, Ontario | Thunder Bay Flyers (USHL) | — |
| 6 | (Canada) | Darren Wetherill | Senior | D | 6' 0" (1.83 m) | 183 lb (83 kg) | 1970-01-28 | Regina, Saskatchewan | Minot Americans (SJHL) | BOS, 189 overall 1990 |
| 7 | (Canada) | Gino Pulente | Freshman | D | 5' 11" (1.8 m) | 180 lb (82 kg) | 1973-08-15 | Sault Ste. Marie, Ontario | Stratford Cullitons (MWJHL) | — |
| 8 | (Canada) | Mike Morin (A) | Junior | F | 5' 11" (1.8 m) | 180 lb (82 kg) | 1971-07-20 | Melville, Saskatchewan | | — |
| 9 | (Canada) | Wayne Strachan | Junior | F | 5' 9" (1.75 m) | 175 lb (79 kg) | 1972-12-12 | Fort Frances, Ontario | Thunder Bay Flyers (USHL) | — |
| 10 | (Canada) | Gerald Tallaire | Freshman | F | 5' 10" (1.78 m) | 178 lb (81 kg) | 1972-03-10 | Winnipeg, Manitoba | Estevan Bruins (SJHL) | — |
| 12 | (Canada) | Sean Tallaire | Sophomore | F | 6' 0" (1.83 m) | 183 lb (83 kg) | 1973-10-03 | Steinbach, Manitoba | Estevan Bruins (SJHL) | VAN, 202 overall 1993 |
| 13 | (United States) | Brad Willner | Junior | D | 6' 4" (1.93 m) | 209 lb (95 kg) | 1973-01-06 | Edina, Minnesota | St. Paul Vulcans (USHL) | NJD, 77 overall 1991 |
| 14 | (Canada) | Clayton Beddoes (C) | Senior | F | 6' 0" (1.83 m) | 190 lb (86 kg) | 1970-11-10 | Bentley, Alberta | Weyburn Red Wings (SJHL) | — |
| 15 | (United States) | Jay Ness (A) | Senior | F | 5' 11" (1.8 m) | 180 lb (82 kg) | 1970-03-31 | Grand Forks, North Dakota | Rochester Mustangs (USHL) | — |
| 16 | (United States) | Rob Valicevic | Junior | F | 6' 1" (1.85 m) | 185 lb (84 kg) | 1971-01-06 | Detroit, Michigan | Detroit Compuware Ambassadors (NAHL) | NYI, 114 overall 1991 |
| 17 | (United States) | Brian Felsner | Freshman | F | 6' 1" (1.85 m) | 185 lb (84 kg) | 1972-11-07 | Mount Clemens, Michigan | Detroit Compuware Ambassadors (NAHL) | — |
| 19 | (Canada) | Mike Koiranen | Freshman | F | 5' 10" (1.78 m) | 178 lb (81 kg) | 1974-04-07 | Thunder Bay, Ontario | Thunder Bay Flyers (USHL) | — |
| 20 | (United States) | Scott McCabe | Freshman | D/F | 6' 4" (1.93 m) | 193 lb (88 kg) | 1974-05-28 | St. Clair Shores, Michigan | | NJD, 94 overall 1992 |
| 21 | (United States) | Kurt Miller | Senior | F | 5' 11" (1.8 m) | 190 lb (86 kg) | 1970-06-01 | Bemidji, Minnesota | Rochester Mustangs (USHL) | STL, 117 overall 1990 |
| 22 | (Canada) | Mike Matteucci | Sophomore | D | 6' 3" (1.91 m) | 191 lb (87 kg) | 1971-12-27 | Trail, British Columbia | Estevan Bruins (SJHL) | — |
| 23 | (Canada) | Dan Galarneau | Freshman | F | 6' 0" (1.83 m) | 194 lb (88 kg) | 1972-08-30 | Charlesbourg, Quebec | Yorkton Terriers (SJHL) | — |
| 24 | (United States) | Dan Angelelli | Junior | F | 5' 11" (1.8 m) | 192 lb (87 kg) | 1970-11-01 | Roseville, Minnesota | | — |
| 25 | (United States) | Matt Alvey | Freshman | F | 6' 5" (1.96 m) | 196 lb (89 kg) | 1975-05-15 | Grand Rapids, Minnesota | Springfield Olympics (NEJHL) | BOS, 51 overall 1993 |
| 26 | (United States) | Chad Crumley | Junior | F | 6' 0" (1.83 m) | 180 lb (82 kg) | 1973-04-28 | Sault Ste. Marie, Michigan | Minot Americans (SJHL) | — |
| 27 | (United States) | Jason Trzcinski | Sophomore | F | 6' 2" (1.88 m) | 188 lb (85 kg) | 1972-12-02 | Livonia, Michigan | Lakeland Jets (NAHL) | — |
| 30 | (United States) | Sean Kulick | Senior | G | 5' 10" (1.78 m) | 178 lb (81 kg) | 1973-10-19 | Riverview, Michigan | Michigan Nationals (NAHL) | — |
| 31 | (Canada) | Blaine Lacher | Senior | G | 6' 1" (1.85 m) | 185 lb (84 kg) | 1970-09-05 | Medicine Hat, Alberta | Melville Millionaires (SJHL) | — |

== Scoring statistics ==
| Name | Position | Games | Goals | Assists | Pts | PIM |
|---|---|---|---|---|---|---|
| Sean Tallaire | RW | 45 | 23 | 32 | 55 | 22 |
| Clayton Beddoes | C | 44 | 23 | 31 | 54 | 56 |
| Wayne Strachan | RW | 45 | 24 | 23 | 47 | 74 |
| Kurt Miller | LW | 40 | 19 | 23 | 42 | 58 |
| Rob Valicevic | RW | 45 | 18 | 20 | 38 | 46 |
| Mike Morin | F | 44 | 12 | 25 | 37 | 75 |
| Gerald Tallaire | F | 35 | 11 | 23 | 34 | 28 |
| Keith Aldridge | D | 45 | 10 | 24 | 34 | 86 |
| Steve Barnes | D | 39 | 7 | 24 | 31 | 34 |
| Jay Ness | C | 45 | 10 | 17 | 27 | 12 |
| Jason Trzcinski | LW | 43 | 12 | 6 | 18 | 32 |
| Mike Matteucci | D | 45 | 6 | 11 | 17 | 64 |
| Brad Willner | D | 45 | 2 | 13 | 15 | 42 |
| Matt Alvey | RW | 41 | 6 | 8 | 14 | 16 |
| Dan Angelelli | RW | 44 | 4 | 8 | 12 | 66 |
| Darren Wetherill | D | 44 | 1 | 8 | 9 | 92 |
| Scott McCabe | D/LW | 18 | 3 | 5 | 8 | 14 |
| Dan Galarneau | RW | 35 | 4 | 3 | 7 | 28 |
| Gino Pulente | D | 21 | 2 | 3 | 5 | 4 |
| Paul Sass | G | 11 | 0 | 3 | 3 | 0 |
| John Bilben | D | 22 | 0 | 3 | 3 | 14 |
| Brian Felsner | C | 6 | 1 | 1 | 2 | 6 |
| Blaine Lacher | G | 30 | 0 | 2 | 2 | 28 |
| Ryan Sharpe | D | 8 | 0 | 1 | 1 | 8 |
| Mike Koiranen | LW | 10 | 0 | 1 | 1 | 8 |
| Sean Kulick | G | 8 | 0 | 0 | 0 | 0 |
| Chad Crumley | D | 0 | - | - | - | - |
| Total | | | | | | |

== Goaltending statistics ==
| Name | Games | Minutes | Wins | Losses | Ties | Goals against | Saves | Shut outs | SV % | GAA |
|---|---|---|---|---|---|---|---|---|---|---|
| Blaine Lacher | 30 | 1785 | 20 | 5 | 4 | 59 | 663 | 6 | .918 | 1.98 |
| Paul Sass | 11 | – | – | – | – | – | – | 0 | – | – |
| Sean Kulick | 8 | – | – | – | – | – | – | 1 | – | – |
| Total | 45 | – | 31 | 10 | 4 | 103 | – | 7 | – | – |

== 1994 national championship game ==
=== (E1) Boston University vs. (W4) Lake Superior State ===
| April 2 | Boston University | 1 – 9 | Lake Superior State | Saint Paul Civic Center |

Scoring summary
| Period | Team | Goal | Assist(s) | Time | Score |
|---|---|---|---|---|---|
| 1st | LSSU | Rob Valicevic | Miller and G. Tallaire | 13:40 | 1–0 LSSU |
| 2nd | LSSU | Matt Alvey – GW | Strachan and Barnes | 23:14 | 2–0 LSSU |
| 2nd | LSSU | Kurt Miller | Valicevic and G. Tallaire | 25:07 | 3–0 LSSU |
| 2nd | BU | Rich Brennan – PP | O'Sullivan and Pomichter | 29:40 | 3–1 LSSU |
| 2nd | LSSU | Jay Ness – PP | Valicevic and G. Tallaire | 34:13 | 4–1 LSSU |
| 2nd | LSSU | Steve Barnes – PP | S. Tallaire and Strachan | 37:26 | 5–1 LSSU |
| 2nd | LSSU | Sean Tallaire – PP | Strachan and Morin | 39:17 | 6–1 LSSU |
| 3rd | LSSU | Mike Matteucci | Beddoes | 44:40 | 7–1 LSSU |
| 3rd | LSSU | Sean Tallaire | Barnes | 52:51 | 8–1 LSSU |
| 3rd | LSSU | Rob Valicevic | Bilben and G. Tallaire | 58:32 | 9–1 LSSU |

Shots by period
| Team | 1 | 2 | 3 | T |
|---|---|---|---|---|
| Lake Superior State | 12 | 15 | 13 | 40 |
| Boston University | 2 | 11 | 12 | 25 |

Goaltenders
| Team | Name | Saves | Goals against | Time on ice |
|---|---|---|---|---|
| LSSU | Blaine Lacher | 24 | 1 | |
| BU | Derek Herlofsky | 19 | | |
| BU | J. P. McKersie | 12 | | |

== Players drafted into the NHL ==
=== 1994 NHL entry draft ===
| = NHL All-Star team | = NHL All-Star | = NHL All-Star and NHL All-Star team | = Hall of Famers | = Did not play in the NHL |

| Round | Pick | Player | NHL team |
|---|---|---|---|
| 6 | 136 | Terry Marchant † | Edmonton Oilers |
| 9 | 229 | John Grahame † | Boston Bruins |

† incoming freshman

== See also ==
- 1994 NCAA Division I men's ice hockey tournament
- List of NCAA Division I men's ice hockey tournament champions
