= 1994 NCAA Division I men's ice hockey tournament =

- Teams: 12
- Finals site: St. Paul Civic Center, Saint Paul, Minnesota
- Champions: Lake Superior State Lakers (3rd title)
- Runner-up: Boston University Terriers (7th title game)
- Semifinalists: Minnesota Golden Gophers (15th Frozen Four); Harvard Crimson (12th Frozen Four)
- Winning coach: Jeff Jackson (2nd title)
- MOP: Sean Tallaire (Lake Superior State)
- Attendance: 76,016

The 1994 NCAA Division I men's ice hockey tournament involved 12 schools playing in single-elimination play to determine the national champion of men's NCAA Division I college ice hockey. It began on March 25, 1994, and ended with the championship game on April 2. A total of 11 games were played.

Lake Superior State's 9-1 win in the title game was the largest margin of victory since 1961.

== Qualifying teams ==
The at-large bids and seeding for each team in the tournament were announced after the conference tournaments concluded. The Central Collegiate Hockey Association (CCHA) and Hockey East each had four teams receive a berth in the tournament while the Western Collegiate Hockey Association (WCHA) and the ECAC had two berths.

East Regional – Albany							West Regional – East Lansing						
Seed	School	Conference	Record	Berth type	Appearance	Last bid	Seed	School	Conference	Record	Berth type	Appearance	Last bid
1	Boston University	Hockey East	32–6–0	Tournament champion	20th	1993	1	Michigan	CCHA	33–6–1	Tournament champion	17th	1993
2	Harvard	ECAC	23–4–4	Tournament champion	16th	1993	2	Minnesota	WCHA	23–11–4	Tournament champion	21st	1993
3	New Hampshire	Hockey East	24–11–3	At-large bid	6th	1992	3	Massachusetts-Lowell	Hockey East	24–9–5	At-large bid	2nd	1988
4	Wisconsin	WCHA	25–14–1	At-large bid	15th	1993	4	Lake Superior State	CCHA	27–10–4	At-large bid	8th	1993
5	Western Michigan	CCHA	24–12–3	At-large bid	2nd	1986	5	Northeastern	Hockey East	19–12–7	At-large bid	3rd	1988
6	Rensselaer	ECAC	21–10–4	At-large bid	7th	1985	6	Michigan State	CCHA	23–12–5	At-large bid	14th	1992

== Game locations ==
- East Regional – Knickerbocker Arena, Albany, New York
- West Regional – Munn Ice Arena, East Lansing, Michigan
- Frozen Four – Saint Paul Civic Center, Saint Paul, Minnesota

== Bracket ==
First Round; March 25–26
E4	Wisconsin	6
E5	Western Michigan	3
W3	Massachusetts-Lowell	4
W6	Michigan State	3
E3	New Hampshire	2
E6	Rensselaer	0
W4	Lake Superior State	6*
W5	Northeastern	5

Quarterfinals; March 26–27
E1	Boston University	4
E4	Wisconsin	1
W2	Minnesota	2**
W3	Massachusetts-Lowell	1
E2	Harvard	7
E3	New Hampshire	1
W1	Michigan	4
W4	Lake Superior State	5*

National Semifinals; March 31
E1	Boston University	4
W2	Minnesota	1
E2	Harvard	2
W4	Lake Superior State	3*

National Championship; April 2
E1	Boston University	1
W4	Lake Superior State	9

Note: * denotes overtime period(s)

== Results ==
=== East Regional – Albany, New York ===
==== First Round ====
March 25, 1994; 8:30 pm	(3) New Hampshire	2–0 (1–0, 1–0, 0–0)	(6) Rensselaer	Knickerbocker Arena; Attendance: 10,455

Game reference
Trent Cavicchi	Goalies	Neil Little	Referees: Matt Shegos; Steve Piotrowski; Linesman: John Kelly
(Malone, Poole) Rob Donovan – GW PP – 13:45 / 1 – 0; (Dexter, Muhr) Scott Malone – PP – 33:50 / 2 – 0			Referees: Matt Shegos; Steve Piotrowski; Linesman: John Kelly
22 min	Penalties	22 min	Referees: Matt Shegos; Steve Piotrowski; Linesman: John Kelly
26	Shots	21	Referees: Matt Shegos; Steve Piotrowski; Linesman: John Kelly

March 25, 1994; 5:00 pm	(4) Wisconsin	6–3 (3–2, 1–1, 2–0)	(5) Western Michigan	Knickerbocker Arena

Game reference

Jim Carey
Goalies
Craig Brown
Referees:
Frank Cole
John Gravallese
Linesman:
John Jones

	0 – 1	04:36 – PP – Colin Ward (Brekke)
(Spencer, Rafalski) Max Williams – 05:08	1 – 1
(Shier, Moore) Jason Zent – PP – 09:33	2 – 1
	2 – 2	13:06 – Ryan D'Arcy (Mayers, Ward)
(Zent, Elick) Kelly Fairchild – 19:31	3 – 2
	3 – 3	23:24 – PP – Derek Innanen (Brooks, Ward)
(Elick, Tucker) Mark Strobel – GW PP – 27:38	4 – 3
(Spencer, Fairchild) Max Williams – 55:02	5 – 3
(Fairchild, Shier) Jamie Spencer – 57:23	6 – 3

26 min
Penalties
22 min
29
Shots
30

==== Quarterfinals ====
March 26, 1994; 5:00 pm	(1) Boston University	4–1 (1–1, 2–0, 1–0)	(4) Wisconsin	Knickerbocker Arena

Game reference

Derek Herlofsky
Goalies
Jim Carey
Referees:
John Gallagher
Bill Stewart

	0 – 1	03:09 – Mike Doers (Tucker, Buss)
(Thornton) Mike Prendergast – 04:24	1 – 1
(Johnson, Grier) Jay Pandolfo – GW – 22:26	2 – 1
(Linna, Pratt) Ken Rausch – 28:53	3 – 1
(Joubert) Mike Prendergast – PP – 48:23	4 – 1

22 min
Penalties
30 min
31
Shots
14

March 26, 1994; 8:30 pm	(2) Harvard	7–1 (2–0, 0–1, 5–0)	(3) New Hampshire	Knickerbocker Arena; Attendance: 9,675

Game reference

Tripp Tracy
Goalies
Trent Cavicchi (out 49:51)
Mike Heinke (in 49:51)
Referees:
Matt Shegos
Steve Piotrowski
Linesman:
John Kelly

(Maguire, Martins) Brian Farrell – PP – 06:51	1 – 0
(unassisted) Steve Martins – GW – 13:53	2 – 0
	2 – 1	21:50 – Dean Woodman (unassisted)
(Martins, Farrell) Sean McCann – PP – 46:44	3 – 1
(Baird) Perry Cohagan – 47:18	4 – 1
(McCann, Farrell) Chris Baird – 49:51	5 – 1
(Coughlin, Nielsen) Jason Karmanos – 51:43	6 – 1
(Body, Coughlin) Cory Gustafson – PP – 53:43	7 – 1

14 min
Penalties
20 min
30
Shots
17

=== West Regional – East Lansing, Michigan ===
==== First Round ====
March 26, 1994; 6:30 pm	(3) Massachusetts–Lowell	4–3 (3–1, 1–2, 0–0)	(6) Michigan State	Munn Ice Arena; Attendance: 6,013

Game reference

Dwayne Roloson
Goalies
Mike Buzak
Referees:
Brien Ricci
Bill Waisanen
Linesman:
John Elvy

(unassisted) Christian Sbrocca – 06:54	1 – 0
	1 – 1	13:08 – SH – Steve Guolla (Carter)
(Angus, Bullock) Ian Herbert – PP – 14:33	2 – 1
(Bullock, Henry) Norm Bazin – PP – 17:08	3 – 1
	3 – 2	20:58 – PP – Steve Suk (Murray, Guolla)
(Herbert) Michael Murray – GW – 25:19	4 – 2
	4 – 3	36:09 – Anson Carter (Guolla, Sullivan)

18 min
Penalties
8 min
17
Shots
27

March 26, 1994; 3:00 pm	(4) Lake Superior State	6–5 (OT) (3–3, 1–1, 1–1, 1–0)	(5) Northeastern	Munn Ice Arena

Game reference

Blaine Lacher
Goalies
Todd Reynolds
Referees:
Rob Hearn
Mike Noeth
Linesman:
Joel Dupree

	0 – 1	03:51 – PP – Jean-Francois Aubé (Taylor, Shields)
(S. Tallaire) Clayton Beddoes – 04:13	1 – 1
(Beddoes, S. Tallaire) Wayne Strachan - PP – 13:07	2 – 1
(Matteucci, Trzcinski) Gerald Tallaire – 13:25	3 – 1
	3 – 2	16:15 – Tom O'Connor (Schuhwerk)
	3 – 3	16:30 – Jordan Shields (Peterson)
	3 – 4	25:52 – Jordan Shields (unassisted)
(Valicevic, Morin) Gerald Tallaire – 31:47	4 – 4
	4 – 5	48:34 – Darryl MacNair (unassisted)
(Aldridge) Gerald Tallaire – PP – 54:11	5 – 5
(Matteucci, Angelelli) Mike Morin – GW – 60:15	6 – 5

8 min
Penalties
12 min
21
Shots
31

==== Quarterfinals ====
March 27, 1994; 2:00 pm	(1) Michigan	4–5 (OT) (1–3, 3–1, 0–0, 0–1)	(4) Lake Superior State	Munn Ice Arena

Game reference

Steve Shields
Goalies
Blaine Lacher
Referees:
Brien Ricci
Bill Waisanen
Linesman:
John Elvy

(Morrison) Mike Stone – 08:52	1 – 0
	1 – 1	12:10 – Rob Valicevic (G. Tallaire)
	1 – 2	14:43 – PP – Keith Aldridge (G. Tallaire, Valicevic)
	1 – 3	15:18 – Jay Ness (Angelelli)
(Knuble, Morrison) Mike Stone – 23:34	2 – 3
(Morrison, Wiseman) Jason Botterill – PP – 26:59	3 – 3
(Morrison, Knuble) David Oliver – PP – 34:56	4 – 3
	4 – 4	39:57 – Kurt Miller (S. Tallaire, Beddoes)
	4 – 5	62:31 – GW – Rob Valicevic (Willner, G. Tallaire)

10 min
Penalties
14 min
37
Shots
33

March 27, 1994; 5:30 pm	(2) Minnesota	2–1 (2OT) (0–1, 0–0, 1–0, 0–0, 1–0)	(3) Massachusetts–Lowell	Munn Ice Arena; Attendance: 6,004

Game reference

Jeff Callinan
Goalies
Dwayne Roloson
Referees:
Rob Hearn
Mike Noeth
Linesman:
Joel Dupree

	0 – 1	10:48 – Dave Mayes (Bullock)
(Larson, C. McAlpine) Nick Checco – 54:27	1 – 1
(Bianci, Trebil) Jeff Nielsen – GW – 89:29	2 – 1

6 min
Penalties
12 min
47
Shots
36

=== Frozen Four – St. Paul, Minnesota ===
==== National Semifinals ====
March 31, 1994; 1:00 pm	(E2) Harvard	2–3 (OT) (0–1, 1–0, 1–1, 0–1)	(W4) Lake Superior State	St. Paul Civic Center; Attendance: 16,048

Game reference

Aaron Israel
Goalies
Blaine Lacher
Referees:
Brien Ricci
Bill Waisanen
Linesman:
John Elvy

	0 – 1	11:47 – PP – Steve Barnes (Morin, S. Tallaire)
(Body) - Brian Farrell – 33:47	1 – 1
	1 – 2	50:29 – Sean Tallaire (Beddoes)
(Farrell, Martins) Sean McCann – PP – 52:18	2 – 2
	2 – 3	64:16 – GW – Clayton Beddoes (S. Tallaire)

17 min
Penalties
16 min
28
Shots
26

March 31, 1994; 7:00 pm	(E1) Boston University	4–1 (3–0, 0–1, 1–0)	(W2) Minnesota	St. Paul Civic Center; Attendance: 16,085

Game reference

J. P. McKersie
Goalies
Jeff Callinan
Referees:
Steve Piotrowski
Matt Shegos
Linesman:
John Kelly

(Friedman) Bob Lachance – 09:14	1 – 0
(Brennen, O'Sullivan) Mike Pomichter – GW – 12:07	2 – 0
(Brennen, O'Sullivan) Steve Thornton – PP – 18:43	3 – 0
	3 – 1	24:42 – Bobby Dustin (LaFleur)
(LaChance, Joubert) Mike Pomichter – 54:12	4 – 1

8 min
Penalties
4 min
33
Shots
32

==== National Championship ====
April 2, 1994; 7:00 pm	(E1) Boston University	1–9 (0–1, 1–5, 0–3)	(W4) Lake Superior State	St. Paul Civic Center; Attendance: 16,085

Game reference
Referees: Mike Noeth; Rob Hearn; Linesman: Joel Dupree

Scoring summary
Period	Team	Goal	Assist(s)	Time	Score
1st	LSSU	Rob Valicevic	Miller and G. Tallaire	13:40	1–0 LSSU
2nd	LSSU	Matt Alvey – GW	Strachan and Barnes	23:14	2–0 LSSU
2nd	LSSU	Kurtis Miller	Valicevic and G. Tallaire	25:07	3–0 LSSU
2nd	BU	Rich Brennan – PP	O'Sullivan and Pomichter	29:40	3–1 LSSU
2nd	LSSU	Jay Ness – PP	Valicevic and G. Tallaire	34:13	4–1 LSSU
2nd	LSSU	Steve Barnes – PP	S. Tallaire and Strachan	37:26	5–1 LSSU
2nd	LSSU	Sean Tallaire – PP	Strachan and Morin	39:17	6–1 LSSU
3rd	LSSU	Mike Matteucci	Beddoes	44:40	7–1 LSSU
3rd	LSSU	Sean Tallaire	Barnes	52:51	8–1 LSSU
3rd	LSSU	Rob Valicevic	Bilben and G. Tallaire	58:32	9–1 LSSU
Penalty summary
Period	Team	Player	Penalty	Time	PIM
1st	LSSU	Gerald Tallaire	Tripping	1:19	2:00
1st	BU	Steve Thornton	Interference	9:53	2:00
1st	BU	Jacques Joubert	Tripping	14:34	2:00
1st	LSSU	Mike Morin	Roughing	17:14	2:00
1st	BU	Doug Wood	Roughing	17:14	2:00
2nd	LSSU	Wayne Strachan	Roughing	25:49	2:00
2nd	BU	Doug Friedman	Charging	25:49	2:00
2nd	LSSU	Keith Aldridge	Holding	27:45	2:00
2nd	LSSU	Kurt Miller	Hooking	30:13	2:00
2nd	BU	Jon Pratt	Holding	33:50	2:00
2nd	LSSU	Mike Morin	Roughing	34:59	2:00
2nd	BU	Dan Donato	Roughing	34:59	2:00
2nd	BU	Rich Brennan	Cross-checking	37:21	2:00
2nd	BU	Rich Brennan	Roughing	38:21	2:00
2nd	LSSU	Rob Valicevic	Hooking	39:45	2:00
3rd	LSSU	Kurt Miller	High-sticking	45:44	2:00
3rd	BU	Mike Grier	Checking from behind	50:49	2:00

Shots by period
Team	1	2	3	T
Lake Superior State	12	15	13	40
Boston University	2	11	12	25

Goaltenders
Team	Name	Saves	Goals against	Time on ice
LSSU	Blaine Lacher	24	1	
BU	Derek Herlofsky	19	4	34:13
BU	J. P. McKersie	12	5	25:47

== All-Tournament team ==
- G: Blaine Lacher (Lake Superior State)
- D: Keith Aldridge (Lake Superior State)
- D: Steve Barnes (Lake Superior State)
- F: Clayton Beddoes (Lake Superior State)
- F: Mike Pomichter (Boston University)
- F: Sean Tallaire* (Lake Superior State)

* Most Outstanding Player(s)

== Record by conference ==
Conference	# of Bids	Record	Win %	Regional semifinals	Frozen Four	Championship Game	Champions
CCHA	4	4-3	.571	2	1	1	1
Hockey East	4	4-4	.500	3	1	1	-
WCHA	2	2-2	.500	2	1	–	-
ECAC	2	1-2	.333	1	1	–	-
