= Mike Kemp =

American athletic director and ice hockey head coach

Biographical details
- Born: December 13, 1952 (age 73); Duluth, Minnesota, U.S.
- Education: Gustavus Adolphus

Coaching career (HC unless noted)
- 1976–1981: Gustavus Adolphus (assistant)
- 1981–1982: Wisconsin (assistant)
- 1982–1983: UIC (assistant)
- 1983–1996: Wisconsin (assistant)
- 1996–2009: Nebraska–Omaha

Administrative career (AD unless noted)
- 2009–2024: Omaha (associate AD)
- 2021: Omaha (interim AD)

Head coaching record
- Overall: 194–223–57
- Tournaments: 0–1

Accomplishments and honors

Awards
- CCHA Coach of the Year (2005)

Mike Kemp (born December 13, 1952) is an American athletic director and former ice hockey head coach for the men's program at Omaha. After having been an associate athletic director at Omaha since 2009, he was named interim athletic director on July 16, 2021, following the departure of former AD Trev Alberts for the same position at the latter's alma mater of Nebraska. He served as interim athletic director until December 2021, when Adrian Dowell of Creighton University assumed the role on a permanent basis. Kemp retired in May 2024.

== Career ==
Kemp began his coaching career with Division III Gustavus Adolphus, his alma mater, in 1976. After five seasons with the Golden Gusties, he moved on to Wisconsin as an assistant for one season. After a year-long stint with Illinois-Chicago, he returned to Madison and remained with the program for thirteen years, helping the Badgers to a national title in 1990.

In the summer of 1996, the Omaha Mavericks, who had announced the intention of sponsoring a Division I program beginning in 1997–98, hired Kemp as the team's first head coach. The Mavericks got started as an Independent, and after two foreseeably poor seasons they were accepted into the CCHA in 1999. Two years into their conference experience, Kemp got the Mavericks to post their first winning season, going 24–15–3, earning a final ranking as the #13 team in the country and just narrowly missing the NCAA tournament.

After another 20+ win season, the Mavericks went into the tank for a pair of years before Kemp was able to pull them out of it and get the team to hover around the .500 mark for five seasons. Kemp got the Mavericks their first berth in the tournament in 2006 with his third 20+ win season, but was not able to push them past #1 seed Boston University. The following offseason, Kemp was offered the position of athletic director with the university, but turned it down when he determined that he could not be head coach and AD at the same time. Two years later, Kemp stepped down as head coach to accept a position as associate AD, clearing the way for two-time national champion Dean Blais to take over the program.

Kemp was inducted into the Omaha Hockey Hall of Fame in 2010.

== Head caching record ==
Record table
Season	Team	Overall	Conference	Standing	Postseason
Nebraska–Omaha Mavericks Independent (1997–1999)
1997–98	Nebraska–Omaha	12–18–3			
1998–99	Nebraska–Omaha	11–24–0			
Nebraska–Omaha:		23–42–3			
Nebraska–Omaha Mavericks (CCHA) (1999–2009)
1999–00	Nebraska–Omaha	16–19–7	10–12–6	7th	CCHA runner-up
2000–01	Nebraska–Omaha	24–15–3	15–10–3	4th	CCHA semifinals
2001–02	Nebraska–Omaha	21–16–4	13–11–4	5th	CCHA first round
2002–03	Nebraska–Omaha	13–22–5	9–17–2	10th	CCHA first round
2003–04	Nebraska–Omaha	8–26–5	5–19–4	12th	CCHA first round
2004–05	Nebraska–Omaha	19–16–4	13–11–4	4th	CCHA quarterfinals
2005–06	Nebraska–Omaha	20–15–6	12–10–6	5th	NCAA Northeast Regional semifinals
2006–07	Nebraska–Omaha	18–16–8	13–11–4	5th	CCHA quarterfinals
2007–08	Nebraska–Omaha	17–19–4	11–13–4	t-7th	CCHA quarterfinals
2008–09	Nebraska–Omaha	15–17–8	8–13–7–3	t-7th	CCHA quarterfinals
Nebraska–Omaha:		171–181–54	109–127–40		
Total:		194–223–57			
National champion Postseason invitational champion Conference regular season champion Conference regular season and conference tournament champion Division regular season champion Division regular season and conference tournament champion Conference tournament champion

== Other involvements ==
In his coaching career, Kemp was known for having teams that were active in community service. Annually, he encouraged his teams to volunteer, raising money for groups as varied as Estabrook Cancer Center, Wounded Warriors, Make-A-Wish, Special Olympics, the Susan B. Komen Cancer research organization, and the Boy and Girls Club.

Kemp has modeled community involvement in his own life. During his coaching career, he served on the board of governors of the American Hockey Coaches Association, serving as a second vice president from 2000 to 2003. He was a member of the board of directors of the Special Olympics of Nebraska from 2002 to 2014. He was a board member of the Nebraska Sports Council from 2015 to 2018. He is currently a board member of the Omaha Sports Hall of Fame.

Kemp also served as the chair of the six-member NCAA Division I Men's Ice Hockey Committee.

Awards and achievements
Preceded by Enrico Blasi	CCHA Coach of the Year; 2004–05	Succeeded by Enrico Blasi
