= George Gwozdecky =

Canadian ice hockey coach (born 1953)

Current position
- Title: Head coach
- Team: Valor Christian High School

Biographical details
- Born: July 17, 1953 (age 73); Thunder Bay, Ontario, Canada

Playing career
- 1974–1978: Wisconsin
- Position: Left wing

Coaching career (HC unless noted)
- 1981–1984: Wisconsin-River Falls
- 1984–1989: Michigan State (assistant)
- 1989–1994: Miami
- 1994–2013: Denver
- 2013–2015: Tampa Bay Lightning (assistant)
- 2015–present: Valor Christian High School

Head coaching record
- Overall: 592-390-85

Accomplishments and honors

Championships
- 1977 NCAA National Champion; 1982 WSUAC regular season champion 1983 WSUAC regular season champion 1983 NAIA National Champion; 1984 WSUAC regular season champion 1986 NCAA national champion (assistant); 1993 CCHA regular season champion 1999 WCHA tournament champion 2002 WCHA regular season champion 2002 WCHA tournament champion 2004 NCAA national champion 2005 WCHA regular season champion 2005 WCHA tournament champion 2005 NCAA national champion 2008 WCHA tournament champion 2010 WCHA regular season champion

Awards
- 1992 CCHA Coach of the Year; 1993 CCHA Coach of the Year; 1993 Spencer Penrose Award; 1995 WCHA Coach of the Year; 2002 WCHA Coach of the Year; 2004 Wisconsin Hockey Hall of Fame; 2005 WCHA Coach of the Year; 2005 Spencer Penrose Award; 2010 WCHA Coach of the Year

George Gwozdecky (born July 17, 1953) is a Canadian ice hockey coach. He resigned as an assistant coach with the Tampa Bay Lightning of the National Hockey League (NHL) in June 2015. In August 2015, he accepted a job as the head hockey coach at Valor Christian High School in Highlands Ranch, CO.

He was the head coach for the University of Denver Pioneers hockey team for 19 seasons, from 1994 until 2013. The Pioneers won 2 national championships (2004/2005) under his guidance, and won at least 20 games in each of the last 12 seasons in which he coached them.

He is a member of the prestigious Miami University "Cradle of Coaches", and is the only person to win the NCAA national championship as a player (with Wisconsin in 1977), assistant coach (at Michigan State in 1986), and head coach with Denver (2004 and 2005).

Gwozdecky is a native of Thunder Bay, Ontario.

Gwozdecky and his wife Bonnie have one daughter, Adrienne.

== Head coaching record ==
Record table
Season	Team	Overall	Conference	Standing	Postseason
Wisconsin–River Falls Falcons (NCHA / WSUAC) (1981–1984)
1981-82	Wisconsin–River Falls	21-13-0		3rd/1st	
1982-83	Wisconsin–River Falls	24-6-1		2nd/1st	NAIA National Champion
1983-84	Wisconsin–River Falls	21-10-1		3rd/1st	
Wisconsin–River Falls:		66-29-2			
Miami Redskins (CCHA) (1989–1994)
1989-90	Miami	12-24-4	8-21-3	7th	CCHA quarterfinals
1990-91	Miami	5-29-3	3-26-3	9th	
1991-92	Miami	18-16-6	12-14-6	5th	CCHA consolation game (loss)
1992-93	Miami	27-9-5	22-3-5	1st	NCAA West Regional Quarterfinals
1993-94	Miami	21-16-1	17-12-1	5th	CCHA second round
Miami:		83-94-19	62-76-18		
Denver Pioneers (WCHA) (1994–2013)
1994-95	Denver	25-15-2	18-12-2	t-2nd	NCAA East Regional semifinals
1995-96	Denver	22-14-3	17-12-3	3rd	WCHA quarterfinals
1996-97	Denver	24-13-4	17-11-4	t-4th	NCAA East Regional semifinals
1997-98	Denver	11-25-2	8-18-2	8th	WCHA first round
1998-99	Denver	26-13-2	15-11-2	3rd	NCAA East Regional Quarterfinals
1999-00	Denver	16-23-2	9-18-1	9th	WCHA first round
2000-01	Denver	19-15-4	14-11-3	6th	WCHA first round
2001-02	Denver	32-8-1	26-6-1	1st	NCAA West Regional semifinals
2002-03	Denver	21-14-6	11-11-6	7th	WCHA first round
2003-04	Denver	27-12-5	13-10-5	t-4th	NCAA national champion
2004-05	Denver	32-9-2	19-7-2	t-1st	NCAA national champion
2005-06	Denver	21-15-3	17-8-3	t-2nd	WCHA first round
2006-07	Denver	21-15-4	13-11-4	4th	WCHA first round
2007-08	Denver	26-14-1	16-11-1	3rd	NCAA Midwest Regional semifinals
2008-09	Denver	23-12-5	16-8-4	2nd	NCAA West Regional semifinals
2009-10	Denver	27-10-4	19-5-4	1st	NCAA East Regional semifinals
2010-11	Denver	25-12-5	17-8-3	2nd	NCAA Midwest Regional Final
2011-12	Denver	25-14-4	16-8-4	6th	NCAA Midwest Regional semifinals
2012-13	Denver	20-14-5	13-9-5	t-4th	NCAA Northeast Regional semifinals
Denver:		443-267-64	294-195-59		
Total:		592-390-85			
National champion Postseason invitational champion Conference regular season champion Conference regular season and conference tournament champion Division regular season champion Division regular season and conference tournament champion Conference tournament champion

== See also ==
- List of college men's ice hockey coaches with 400 wins

Awards and achievements
Preceded by Jeff Jackson	CCHA Coach of the Year; 1991–92 / 1992–93	Succeeded by Red Berenson
Preceded by Ron Mason; Scott Sandelin	Spencer Penrose Award; 1992–93; 2004–05	Succeeded by Don Lucia; Enrico Blasi
Preceded by Don Lucia; Dean Blais; Scott Sandelin; Dave Hakstol	WCHA Coach of the Year; 1994–95; 2001–02; 2004–05; 2009–10	Succeeded by Don Lucia; Troy Jutting; Don Lucia/Bob Motzko; Dean Blais
