= Mike Morin =

Mike Morin may refer to:

- Mike Morin (baseball) (born 1991), American baseball player
- Mike Morin (ice hockey) (born 1972), Canadian ice hockey player
