= CCHA Coach of the Year =

- Sport: Ice hockey
- Awarded for: The Coach of the Year in the CCHA

History
- First award: 1976 (on hiatus, 2014–2021)
- Most recent: Luke Strand

The CCHA Coach of the Year is an annual award given out at the conclusion of the Central Collegiate Hockey Association regular season to the best coach in the conference as voted by the coaches of each CCHA team.

The longest continually conferred award in CCHA history, the 'Coach of the Year' was first awarded in 1976 and every year thereafter until 2013 when the original CCHA was dissolved as a consequence of the Big Ten Conference forming its men's ice hockey conference. After the CCHA was revived in 2021–22 by seven schools that left the men's Western Collegiate Hockey Association, the Coach of the Year award was reinstated.

Ron Mason and Jeff Jackson are the only coaches to win the award with multiple teams.

== Award winners ==
Year	Winner	School
1975–76	Ron Mason	Bowling Green
1976–77	Bill Selman	St. Louis
1977–78	Ron Mason	Bowling Green
1978–79	Ron Mason	Bowling Green
1979–80	Rick Comley	Northern Michigan
1980–81	Rick Comley	Northern Michigan
1981–82	Jerry York	Bowling Green
1982–83	Jerry Welsh	Ohio State
1983–84	Bill Wilkinson	Western Michigan
1984–85	Ron Mason	Michigan State
1985–86	Bill Wilkinson	Western Michigan
1986–87	Val Belmonte	Illinois–Chicago
1987–88	Frank Anzalone	Lake Superior State
1988–89	Ron Mason	Michigan State
1989–90	Ron Mason	Michigan State
1990–91	Jeff Jackson	Lake Superior State
1991–92	George Gwozdecky	Miami
1992–93	George Gwozdecky	Miami
1993–94	Red Berenson	Michigan
1994–95	Buddy Powers	Bowling Green
1995–96	Bill Wilkinson	Western Michigan
1996–97	Mark Mazzoleni	Miami

Year	Winner	School
1997–98	John Markell	Ohio State
1998–99	Ron Mason	Michigan State
1999–00	Scott Borek	Lake Superior State
2000–01	Enrico Blasi	Miami
2001–02	Guy Gadowsky	Alaska–Fairbanks
2002–03	Bob Daniels	Ferris State
2003–04	Enrico Blasi	Miami
2004–05	Mike Kemp	Nebraska–Omaha
2005–06	Enrico Blasi	Miami
2006–07	Jeff Jackson	Notre Dame
2007–08	Red Berenson	Michigan
2008–09	Dallas Ferguson	Alaska
2009–10	Enrico Blasi	Miami
2010–11	Jeff Jackson	Notre Dame
2011–12	Bob Daniels	Ferris State
2012–13	Enrico Blasi	Miami
2021–22	Mike Hastings	Minnesota State
2022–23	Joe Shawhan	Michigan Tech
2023–24	Tom Serratore	Bemidji State
2024–25	Luke Strand	Minnesota State
2025–26	Luke Strand	Minnesota State

=== Winners by school ===
School	Winners
Miami	8
Bowling Green	5
Michigan State	4
Lake Superior State	3
Minnesota State	3
Western Michigan	3
Alaska	2
Ferris State	2
Michigan	2
Northern Michigan	2
Notre Dame	2
Ohio State	2
Bemidji State	1
Illinois–Chicago	1
Michigan Tech	1
Omaha	1
Saint Louis	1

=== Multiple Winners ===
Coach	Awards
Ron Mason	7
Enrico Blasi	5
Jeff Jackson	3
Bill Wilkinson	3
Rick Comley	2
George Gwozdecky	2
Red Berenson	2
Bob Daniels	2
Luke Strand	2

== See also ==
- CCHA Awards
