= Peter White (ice hockey) =

Canadian ice hockey player

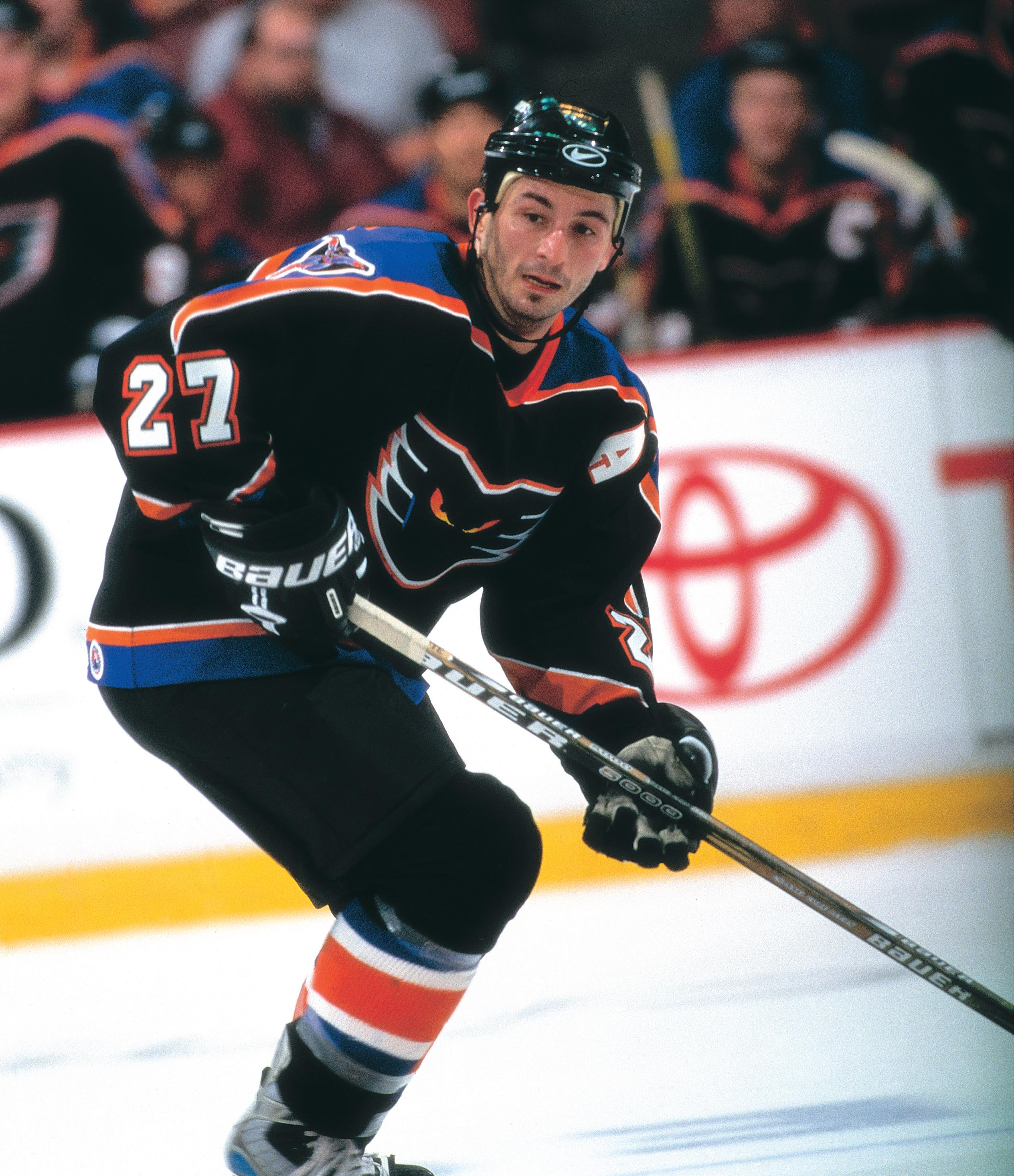
- White with the Philadelphia Phantoms in 2004
- Born: March 15, 1969 (age 57) Montreal, Quebec, Canada
- Height: 5 ft 11 in (180 cm)
- Weight: 195 lb (88 kg; 13 st 13 lb)
- Position: Centre
- Shot: Left
- Played for: Edmonton Oilers; Toronto Maple Leafs; Philadelphia Flyers; Chicago Blackhawks
- NHL draft: 92nd overall, 1989; Edmonton Oilers
- Playing career: 1992–2006

Peter White (born March 15, 1969) is a Canadian former professional ice hockey centre who played nine seasons in the National Hockey League (NHL) for the Edmonton Oilers, Toronto Maple Leafs, Philadelphia Flyers and Chicago Blackhawks.

== Playing career ==
As a youth, White played in the 1982 Quebec International Pee-Wee Hockey Tournament with a minor ice hockey team from the Montreal North Shore.

White was drafted in the fifth round, and 92nd overall, by the Edmonton Oilers in the 1989 NHL entry draft. He played 220 career NHL games, scoring 23 goals and 37 assists for 60 points while recording 36 penalty minutes playing for the Edmonton Oilers, Toronto Maple Leafs, Philadelphia Flyers and Chicago Blackhawks.

White spent most of his career in the American Hockey League (AHL), playing in a total of 747 games while scoring 250 goals and 533 assists for 783 points and recording 286 penalty minutes. He led the AHL in total points in 1995, 1997 and 1998.

In September 2005, he signed with HIFK of the Finnish SM-liiga for the 2005–06 season. In 49 games, he scored 4 goals and 10 assists for 14 points while recording 20 penalty minutes. In the post-season that year, he recorded 1 assist and 8 penalty minutes in 11 games.

== Personal life ==
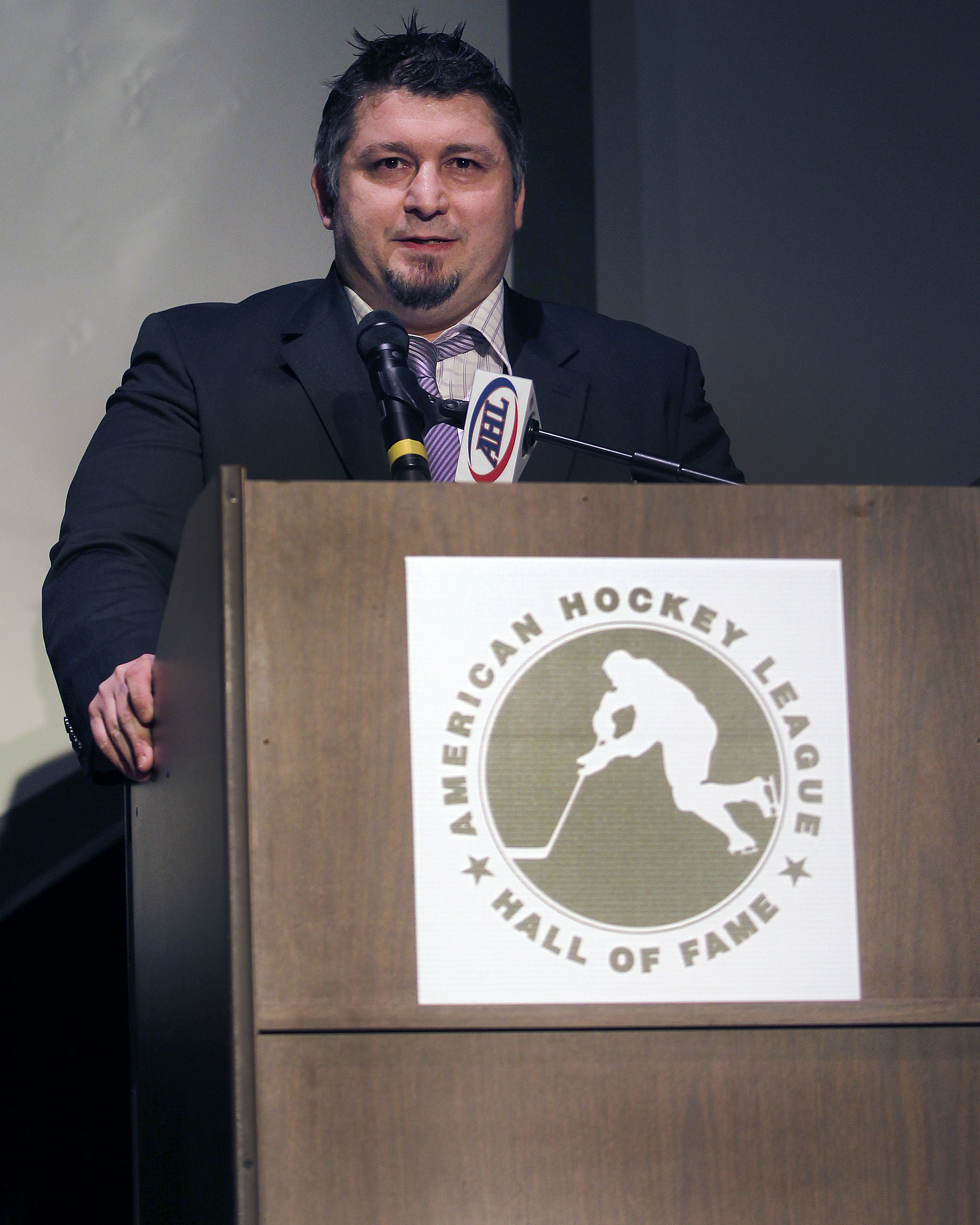
White at his AHL Hall of Fame induction ceremony in 2013.

White was once married to Jody Clarke, daughter of Bobby Clarke. At the time, Clarke was the general manager of the Philadelphia Flyers, where White spent eight seasons in both the AHL and NHL in two different stints with the organization.

== Awards and honours ==
Award	Year
All-CCHA Rookie Team	1988–89
CCHA All-Tournament Team	1990
John B. Sollenberger Trophy	1994–95, 1996–97, 1997–98
AHL Hall of Fame inductee	2013

== Career statistics ==
			Regular season					Playoffs
Season	Team	League	GP	G	A	Pts	PIM	GP	G	A	Pts	PIM
1984–85	Lac Saint-Louis Lions	QMAAA	42	16	32	48	18	11	4	3	7	4
1985–86	Lac Saint-Louis Lions	QMAAA	42	38	62	100	28	2	3	1	4	2
1986–87	Pembroke Lumber Kings	CJHL	55	20	34	54	20	—	—	—	—	—
1986–87	Pembroke Lumber Kings	Cen-Cup	—	—	—	—	—	4	2	2	4	2
1987–88	Pembroke Lumber Kings	CJHL	56	90	136	226	32	—	—	—	—	—
1987–88	Pembroke Lumber Kings	Cen-Cup	—	—	—	—	—	4	3	6	9
1988–89	Michigan State University	CCHA	46	20	33	53	17	—	—	—	—	—
1989–90	Michigan State University	CCHA	45	22	40	62	6	—	—	—	—	—
1990–91	Michigan State University	CCHA	37	7	31	38	28	—	—	—	—	—
1991–92	Michigan State University	CCHA	41	26	49	75	32	—	—	—	—	—
1992–93	Cape Breton Oilers	AHL	64	12	28	40	10	16	3	3	6	12
1993–94	Cape Breton Oilers	AHL	45	21	49	70	12	5	2	3	5	2
1993–94	Edmonton Oilers	NHL	26	3	5	8	2	—	—	—	—	—
1994–95	Cape Breton Oilers	AHL	65	36	69	105	30	—	—	—	—	—
1994–95	Edmonton Oilers	NHL	9	2	4	6	0	—	—	—	—	—
1995–96	Edmonton Oilers	NHL	26	5	3	8	0	—	—	—	—	—
1995–96	Toronto Maple Leafs	NHL	1	0	0	0	0	—	—	—	—	—
1995–96	St. John's Maple Leafs	AHL	17	6	7	13	6	—	—	—	—	—
1995–96	Atlanta Knights	IHL	36	21	20	41	4	3	0	3	3	2
1996–97	Philadelphia Phantoms	AHL	80	44	61	105	28	10	6	8	14	6
1997–98	Philadelphia Phantoms	AHL	80	27	78	105	28	20	9	9	18	6
1998–99	Philadelphia Phantoms	AHL	77	31	59	90	20	16	4	13	17	12
1998–99	Philadelphia Flyers	NHL	3	0	0	0	0	—	—	—	—	—
1999–2000	Philadelphia Phantoms	AHL	62	20	41	61	38	—	—	—	—	—
1999–2000	Philadelphia Flyers	NHL	21	1	5	6	6	16	0	2	2	0
2000–01	Philadelphia Flyers	NHL	77	9	16	25	16	3	0	0	0	0
2001–02	Norfolk Admirals	AHL	24	4	19	23	18	4	0	1	1	0
2001–02	Chicago Blackhawks	NHL	48	3	3	6	10	—	—	—	—	—
2002–03	Norfolk Admirals	AHL	31	6	17	23	21	9	2	4	6	5
2002–03	Philadelphia Phantoms	AHL	47	17	26	43	16	—	—	—	—	—
2002–03	Chicago Blackhawks	NHL	6	0	1	1	0	—	—	—	—	—
2003–04	Philadelphia Flyers	NHL	3	0	0	0	2	—	—	—	—	—
2003–04	Philadelphia Phantoms	AHL	75	12	48	60	39	12	2	1	3	10
2004–05	Philadelphia Phantoms	AHL	10	2	6	8	6	—	—	—	—	—
2004–05	Utah Grizzlies	AHL	70	12	25	37	14	—	—	—	—	—
2005–06	HIFK	SM-l	49	4	10	14	20	11	0	1	1	8
AHL totals			747	250	533	783	286	92	28	42	70	53
NHL totals			220	23	37	60	36	19	0	2	2	0

Awards and achievements
Preceded by Jason Muzzatti	CCHA Most Valuable Player in Tournament; 1990	Succeeded by Clayton Beddoes
