= Val Belmonte =

American ice hockey coach (born 1951)

Biographical details
- Born: May 26, 1951 (age 75); Chicago, IL, USA
- Education: University of Illinois at Chicago

Coaching career (HC unless noted)
- 1973–1975: Oak Park/River Forest HS (assistant)
- 1975–1976: North Dakota (assistant)
- 1976–1979: Illinois–Chicago (assistant)
- 1979–1982: Harvard (assistant)
- 1982–1990: Illinois–Chicago
- 1991–2000: USA Hockey (Dir. Coaching)
- 2000–2004: Union (AD)
- 2004–2005: U.S. Figure Skating (Exec. Dir.)
- 2006–2009: Quinnipiac (VP)
- 2009–2012: Game 7 Seven (Principle partner)
- 2012–2013: USA Fencing (CEO)
- 2013–2024: Winston Knolls Education Group (CEO)
- 2014–present: USA Ultimate (BoD)

Head coaching record
- Overall: 114–183–12 (.388)

Accomplishments and honors

Awards
- 1987 CCHA Coach of the Year; 2007 Illinois Hockey Hall of Fame

Val Belmonte (born 1951) is an American former ice hockey coach, player and executive. He has also served as a sports official and university athletics director. He played for the University of Illinois Chicago (UIC), followed by an 18-year college coaching career. His longest coaching stint was from 1982–1990 as the head coach of the UIC Flames, during which he won the 1987 CCHA Coach of the Year Award. Belmonte has written several books on the sport of hockey, including several manuals published by USA Hockey which serves as the National Governing body for the sport in the United States.

== Career ==
After graduating from the now defunct Holy Cross High School in River Grove, Illinois, in 1969, Belmonte attended UIC, where he was member of the varsity team. Belmonte had a severe eye injury that ended his playing career He had eye reattachment surgery after he was checked into the boards of a new rink, that had a nail sticking out of the boards. After his graduation from UIC, Belmonte took up coaching. He was the head coach of Oak Park River Forest High School in 1974–75 which won the 1975 Amateur Hockey Association of Illinois State Varsity Championships (now known as "Blackhawk Cup").

Belmonte coached college hockey from 1975 to 1990 with the University of North Dakota, Harvard University and the University of Illinois-Chicago. He led the UIC Flames to six Central Collegiate Hockey Association playoff appearances as the head coach and was named CCHA Coach of the Year in 1986–87. Belmonte coached several players who played in the NHL, including Shawn Cronin, Ray Stazek, and long time minor league star Colin Chin. Belmonte also coached Jeff Nelson, who went on to represent the United States in the World Cup of Inline hockey. As an assistant at Harvard University, he coached Hobey Baker Award winners Mark and Scott Fusco.

From 1991 until 2000, Belmonte was Director of Coaching at USA Hockey, Inc. in Colorado Springs. From 2000–2004, Belmonte took over as Athletic Director of Union College. In his tenure, Union rebuilt many of their athletic facilities including a state of the art football field and field house. During his years at Union College, Belmonte served on the executive comm. for the ECAC, and was involving in the breaking away of the ECAC to form a subsidiary, the ECACHL.

After Union College, Belmonte was executive director of the United States Figure Skating Association for a year, before being named Vice President of Athletic Marketing and External Affairs Quinnipiac University in 2006. In 2009, Belmonte left Quinnipiac to become executive vice-president in the Chicago office of DHR International.

Belmonte was the executive director of the Winston Knolls Foundation which owned the Winston Knolls School, On June 30, 2024, he retired his position and gave it to Mariah Madson.

== Head coaching record ==
Record table
Season	Team	Overall	Conference	Standing	Postseason
Illinois–Chicago Flames (CCHA) (1982–1990)
1982–83	Illinois–Chicago	6–28–2	6–24–2	12th	
1983–84	Illinois–Chicago	5–29–1	5–22–1	12th	
1984–85	Illinois–Chicago	17–23–0	15–17–0	5th	CCHA Quarterfinals
1985–86	Illinois–Chicago	14–25–1	12–20–0	7th	CCHA Quarterfinals
1986–87	Illinois–Chicago	21–17–1	18–13–1	4th	CCHA Quarterfinals
1987–88	Illinois–Chicago	18–20–1	14–17–1	6th	CCHA Quarterfinals
1988–89	Illinois–Chicago	23–14–5	18–10–4	3rd	CCHA Consolation Game (Loss)
1989–90	Illinois–Chicago	10–27–1	7–24–1	9th	
Illinois–Chicago:		114–183–12	95–147–10		
Total:		114–183–12			
National champion Postseason invitational champion Conference regular season champion Conference regular season and conference tournament champion Division regular season champion Division regular season and conference tournament champion Conference tournament champion

== Awards ==
- 1987 – CCHA Coach of the Year Award
- 2007 – Belmonte was inducted into the Illinois Hockey Hall of Fame.

Awards and achievements
Preceded by Bill Wilkinson	CCHA Coach of the Year; 1986–87	Succeeded by Frank Anzalone
