= Larry Pedrie =

American ice hockey player and coach

Biographical details
- Born: Detroit, MI, USA
- Education: Ferris State University

Playing career
- 1977–1981: Ferris State
- Position: Defenseman

Coaching career (HC unless noted)
- 1981–1984: Ferris State (assistant)
- 1984–1987: Illinois–Chicago (assistant)
- 1987–1990: Michigan (assistant)
- 1990–1996: Illinois–Chicago
- 1996–1999: Chicago Blackhawks (Scout)
- 1999–2001: Chicago Freeze (assistant)
- 2001–2004: NAHL (Commissioner)
- 2007: Chicago Mission
- 2007–2009: Team Illinois
- 2016–Present: Chicago Young Americans

Head coaching record
- Overall: 64–140–19 (.330)

Larry Pedrie is an American ice hockey coach and former player. He has held several coaching and administrative positions over more than 35 years at both the professional and amateur level.

== Career ==
Pedrie attended Ferris State where he played on the varsity team for four years. In his junior season the Bulldogs jumped up to Division I, finishing the season as CCHA Runners-Up and the following year as conference semifinalists. After graduating in 1981 Pedrie immediately turned to coaching, joining the staff at his alma mater for three seasons before moving on to both Illinois–Chicago and Michigan in the same capacity. In 1990 Pedrie got his first had coaching job with Illinois–Chicago, and produced modest gains the first year. In six seasons with the Flames Pedrie's team lost 20 games each season and lost 10 of 11 postseasons games. The university terminated the hockey program after the 1996 season but Pedrie received several job offers, accepting a position as an advance scout for the Chicago Blackhawks.

Pedrie founded a youth hockey clinic in 1997, Larry Pedrie Hockey, which his still runs (as of 2018) while continuing his career in hockey management. he was also the commissioner of the NAHL for three seasons after the turn of the century.

== Head coaching record ==
Record table
Season	Team	Overall	Conference	Standing	Postseason
Illinois–Chicago Flames (CCHA) (1990–1996)
1990–91	Illinois–Chicago	13–23–2	9–21–2	8th	CCHA Quarterfinals
1991–92	Illinois–Chicago	10–20–6	8–18–6	7th	CCHA Quarterfinals
1992–93	Illinois–Chicago	10–25–2	8–20–2	9th	CCHA First Round
1993–94	Illinois–Chicago	11–26–2	8–20–2	9th	CCHA First Round
1994–95	Illinois–Chicago	11–22–4	8–16–3	8th	CCHA Opening Round
1995–96	Illinois–Chicago	9–24–3	6–23–1	11th	CCHA Quarterfinals
Illinois–Chicago:		64–140–19	47–118–16		
Total:		64–140–19			
National champion Postseason invitational champion Conference regular season champion Conference regular season and conference tournament champion Division regular season champion Division regular season and conference tournament champion Conference tournament champion
