= Jeff Jackson (ice hockey, born 1955) =

American ice hockey coach (born 1955)

Biographical details
- Born: June 22, 1955 (age 71); Roseville, Michigan, U.S.
- Education: Michigan State

Coaching career (HC unless noted)
- 1986–1990: Lake Superior State (asst.)
- 1990–1996: Lake Superior State
- 2000–2003: Guelph Storm
- 2003–2004: New York Islanders (asst.)
- 2005–2025: Notre Dame

Head coaching record
- Overall: 601–343–99 (.624)
- Tournaments: 28–18 (.609)

Accomplishments and honors

Championships
- 1988 NCAA Championship (assistant); 1992 NCAA Championship; 1994 NCAA Championship; 7× CCHA tournament champion (1991, 1992, 1993, 1995, 2007, 2009, 2013); 4× CCHA regular season champion (1991, 1996, 2007, 2009); 2× Big Ten tournament champion (2018, 2019); Big Ten regular season champion (2018)

Awards
- 2× Spencer T. Penrose Award (Coach of the Year) (2007, 2018); 3× CCHA Coach of the Year (1991, 2007, 2011); 2× College Hockey News Coach of the Year (2007, 2018)

Jeffery L. Jackson (born June 22, 1955) is an American former ice hockey coach. He most recently served as the head coach at the University of Notre Dame from 2005 to 2025. He previously served as the head coach at Lake Superior State University, where he won two NCAA men's ice hockey championships. He has also been an assistant coach with the New York Islanders and head coach for the Guelph Storm.

== Coaching career ==
Jackson got his start in college hockey at Lake Superior State University in 1986, where he worked with Frank Anzalone, helping lead the Lakers to one CCHA championship, and the 1988 NCAA Men's Ice Hockey Championship. When Anzalone left the Lakers in 1990, Jackson was promoted to head coach.

In his six years as head coach with Lake Superior, from 1990 to 1996, Jackson led the team to six consecutive NCAA appearances, including three straight trips to the finals from 1992 to 1994, and winning the 1992 and 1994 championships.

Jackson stepped down as head coach of Lake Superior to become the national coach and senior director of the newly founded U.S. National Team Development program, based in Ann Arbor, Michigan. In his first season, he guided the U.S. Junior National Team to a silver medal in the 1997 World Junior Championships. Jackson was also an assistant coach for Team USA at the 1998 Winter Olympics.

He left the U.S. National Team in 2000 to become the head coach of the Guelph Storm in the Ontario Hockey League. Jackson led the Storm to a 16-point improvement from the previous season, as Guelph finished in second place in the Midwest Division. In the 2001–02 season, Guelph improved once again, as they earned 82 points, finishing in second place once again in the Midwest Division, and hosted the 2002 Memorial Cup, advancing to the tie-breaker game, where they lost to the Victoriaville Tigres. Jackson began the 2002–03 with the Storm, however, the team struggled and Jackson was replaced midway through the season. He had a record of 87–67–24–4 during his time in Guelph.

Jackson moved on to the New York Islanders of the National Hockey League in 2003–04, as he was hired by Islanders head coach Steve Stirling to work on his staff. The Islanders had a successful season, earning 91 points and a trip to the playoffs, however, they were eliminated by the Tampa Bay Lightning in the first round. Jackson remained with the club during the cancelled 2004–05 NHL season.

In 2005, the Notre Dame Fighting Irish hired Jackson to turn around their hockey team, which had a tough 2004–05 season, in which the Irish had a record of 5–27–6. In his first year in Notre Dame, Jackson helped the team to a 13–19–4 record, which was a fourteen-point improvement over the previous season. In 2006–07, the Fighting Irish set numerous team records, including overall wins (32) and CCHA wins (21) as Notre Dame captured their first ever CCHA regular season and tournament championships. The Irish advanced to the NCAA tournament for the second time in school history, and earned their first ever tournament win. Jackson was awarded the CCHA Coach of the Year and the Spencer Penrose Award as the National Coach of the Year. Notre Dame had another strong season in 2007–08, and advanced to the NCAA Championship for the second straight season. The Fighting Irish upset the #1 seed University of New Hampshire 7–3 in their first game, followed by a 3–1 victory over Michigan State to advance to the Frozen Four for the first time in school history. Notre Dame stayed hot, and defeated the #1 seeded Michigan Wolverines 5–4 in overtime to advance to their first ever berth in the final. Boston College would win the championship, as they defeated Notre Dame 4–1. Another record-setting regular season followed in 2008–09, with the Irish earning a top seed in the NCAA Championship, however they were defeated in the first round by Bemidji State.

On June 24, 2024, Jackson announced he would step down as head coach following the 2024–25 season, after 20 seasons at Notre Dame. On March 7, 2025, during the first quarterfinals game of the 2025 Big Ten men's ice hockey tournament against Minnesota, Jackson earned his 600th career victory.

== Head coaching record ==
=== College ===
Record table
Season	Team	Overall	Conference	Standing	Postseason
Lake Superior State Lakers (CCHA) (1990–1996)
1990–91	Lake Superior State	36–5–4	26–2–4	1st	NCAA Quarterfinals
1991–92	Lake Superior State	30–9–4	20–8–4	2nd	NCAA national champion
1992–93	Lake Superior State	32–8–5	20–5–5	3rd	NCAA runner-up
1993–94	Lake Superior State	31–10–4	18–8–4	2nd	NCAA national champion
1994–95	Lake Superior State	23–12–6	14–9–4	T–4th	NCAA regional semifinals
1995–96	Lake Superior State	30–8–2	22–6–2	T–1st	NCAA regional semifinals
Lake Superior State:		182–52–25 (.751)	120–38–23 (.727)		
Notre Dame Fighting Irish (CCHA) (2005–2013)
2005–06	Notre Dame	13–19–4	11–13–4	T–8th	CCHA first round
2006–07	Notre Dame	32–7–3	21–4–3	1st	NCAA Regional Finals
2007–08	Notre Dame	27–16–4	15–9–4	4th	NCAA runner-up
2008–09	Notre Dame	31–6–3	21–4–3–3	1st	NCAA regional semifinals
2009–10	Notre Dame	13–17–8	9–12–7–2	9th	CCHA first round
2010–11	Notre Dame	25–14–5	18–7–3–2	2nd	NCAA Frozen Four
2011–12	Notre Dame	19–18–3	12–13–3–0	T–8th	CCHA Quarterfinals
2012–13	Notre Dame	25–13–3	17–8–3–2	2nd	NCAA regional semifinals
Notre Dame Fighting Irish (Hockey East) (2013–2017)
2013–14	Notre Dame	23–15–2	9–9–2	T–7th	NCAA regional semifinals
2014–15	Notre Dame	18–19–5	10–7–5	5th	Hockey East Quarterfinals
2015–16	Notre Dame	19–11–7	15–5–2	3rd	NCAA regional semifinals
2016–17	Notre Dame	23–12–5	12–6–4	4th	NCAA Frozen Four
Notre Dame Fighting Irish (Big Ten) (2017–present)
2017–18	Notre Dame	25–9–2	17–6–1	1st	NCAA runner-up
2018–19	Notre Dame	23–14–3	11–11–2	2nd	NCAA Regional Final
2019–20	Notre Dame	15–15–7	9–9–6–4	5th	Big Ten Quarterfinals
2020–21	Notre Dame	14–13–2	12–10–2	4th	NCAA regional semifinals
2021–22	Notre Dame	28–12–0	17–7–0	3rd	NCAA Regional Final
2022–23	Notre Dame	16–16–5	10–10–4	4th	Big Ten Quarterfinals
2023–24	Notre Dame	15–19–2	9–13–2	5th	Big Ten Quarterfinals
2024–25	Notre Dame	12–25–1	4–19–1	7th	Big Ten Semifinals
Notre Dame:		419–291–74 (.582)	242–176–60 (.569)		
Total:		601–343–98 (.472)			
National champion Postseason invitational champion Conference regular season champion Conference regular season and conference tournament champion Division regular season champion Division regular season and conference tournament champion Conference tournament champion

== See also ==
- List of college men's ice hockey coaches with 400 wins

Awards and achievements
Preceded by Ron Mason; Enrico Blasi; Enrico Blasi	CCHA Coach of the Year; 1990–91; 2006–07; 2010–11	Succeeded by George Gwozdecky; Red Berenson; Bob Daniels
Preceded by Enrico Blasi; Jim Montgomery	Spencer Penrose Award; 2006–07; 2017–18	Succeeded by Red Berenson; Greg Carvel
