= Enrico Blasi =

Canadian ice hockey player

Current position
- Title: Head Coach
- Team: St. Thomas
- Conference: NCHC
- Record: 48–89–9 (.360)

Biographical details
- Born: February 16, 1972 (age 54); Weston, Ontario, Canada
- Education: Miami University

Playing career
- 1990–1994: Miami

Coaching career (HC unless noted)
- 1995–1999: Denver (asst.)
- 1999–2019: Miami
- 2021–present: St. Thomas

Administrative career (AD unless noted)
- 2020–2021: Providence (Assoc. AD)

Head coaching record
- Overall: 446–400–86 (.525)
- Tournaments: 8–10 (.444)

Accomplishments and honors

Championships
- 2006 CCHA regular season champion 2010 CCHA regular season champion 2011 Mason Cup; 2013 CCHA regular season champion 2015 NCHC Tournament champion

Awards
- 2001 CCHA Coach of the Year; 2004 CCHA Coach of the Year; 2006 CCHA Coach of the Year; 2006 Spencer Penrose Award; 2010 CCHA Coach of the Year; 2013 CCHA Coach of the Year

Enrico Blasi (born February 16, 1972) is a Canadian hockey coach, former player and athletics administrator who currently serves as head coach at the University of St. Thomas. Blasi was previously the head coach for the Miami RedHawks men's ice hockey team, a position he occupied from 1999 until his firing in 2019.

== Life and career ==
Blasi is a native of Weston, Ontario. He is an alumnus of Miami University and played for the hockey team from 1990–94, playing on Miami's CCHA championship team in 1992–93 and captaining the 1993–94 team. He came to Miami after working four years—three as an assistant and one as a graduate assistant—under his former Miami coach George Gwozdecky, who moved to the University of Denver in 1994. Blasi became head coach of his alma mater in 1999 and, at the time, was the youngest head coach in Division I college hockey. He received the Spencer Penrose Award in 2006 and won four CCHA Coach of the Year Awards in 2000–01, 2003–04, 2005–06, 2009–10. Blasi got his 300th win on January 25, 2013 during a 2–1 victory over CCHA rival Bowling Green.

Blasi is a member of the Advisory Board for You Can Play, a campaign dedicated to fighting homophobia in sports. After serving one year as an associate athletic director for men's and women's hockey, at Providence College of Hockey East, Blasi was named the head men's hockey coach at St. Thomas on April 2, 2021, before the school's first season at the Division I level.

== Head coaching record ==
Record table
Season	Team	Overall	Conference	Standing	Postseason
Miami RedHawks (CCHA) (1999–2013)
1999–00	Miami	13–20–3	10–15–3	t-9th	CCHA first round
2000–01	Miami	20–16–2	17–10–1	t-2nd	CCHA first round
2001–02	Miami	12–22–2	9–17–2	10th	CCHA first round
2002–03	Miami	21–17–3	13–12–3	t-5th	CCHA first round
2003–04	Miami	23–14–4	17–8–3	2nd	NCAA West Regional semifinal
2004–05	Miami	15–18–5	11–13–4	7th	CCHA first round
2005–06	Miami	26–9–4	20–6–2	1st	NCAA Northeast Regional semifinal
2006–07	Miami	24–14–4	16–8–4	3rd	NCAA Northeast Regional Final
2007–08	Miami	33–8–1	21–6–1	2nd	NCAA Northeast Regional Final
2008–09	Miami	23–13–5	17–7–4–2	t-2nd	NCAA runner-up
2009–10	Miami	29–8–7	21–2–5–2	1st	NCAA Frozen Four
2010–11	Miami	23–10–6	16–7–5–2	3rd	NCAA Northeast Regional semifinal
2011–12	Miami	24–15–2	15–11–2–1	4th	NCAA East Regional semifinals
2012–13	Miami	25–12–5	17–7–4–4	1st	NCAA Midwest Regional finals
Miami:		311–196–53	222–129–43		
Miami RedHawks (NCHC) (2013–2019)
2013–14	Miami	15–20–3	6–17–1–1	8th	NCHC runner-up
2014–15	Miami	25–14–1	14–9–1–1	2nd	NCAA East Regional semifinals
2015–16	Miami	15–18–3	9–13–2–2	5th	NCHC first round
2016–17	Miami	9–20–7	5–14–5–3	7th	NCHC first round
2017–18	Miami	12–20–5	6–14–4–2	8th	NCHC quarterfinals
2018–19	Miami	11–23–4	5–17–2–1	T–7th	NCHC quarterfinals
Miami:		87–115–23	45–84–15		
St. Thomas Tommies (CCHA) (2021-2026–present)
2021–22	St. Thomas	3–32–1	3–22–1	8th	CCHA Quarterfinal
2022–23	St. Thomas	11–23–2	10–14–2	7th	CCHA Quarterfinal
2023–24	St. Thomas	15–20–2	12–11–1	T–2nd	CCHA Quarterfinal
2024–25	St. Thomas	19–14–5	13–9–4	3rd	CCHA Runner-up
St. Thomas Tommies (NCHC) (2026–present)
2026–27	St. Thomas	3–4-0	1-1–0		NCHC Quarterfinal
St. Thomas:		48–89–9	38–56–8		
Total:		446–400–86			
National champion Postseason invitational champion Conference regular season champion Conference regular season and conference tournament champion Division regular season champion Division regular season and conference tournament champion Conference tournament champion

Awards and achievements
Preceded by Scott Borek; Bob Daniels; Mike Kemp; Dallas Ferguson; Bob Daniels	CCHA Coach of the Year; 2000–01; 2003–04; 2005–06; 2009–10; 2012–13	Succeeded by Guy Gadowsky; Mike Kemp; Jeff Jackson; Jeff Jackson; Mike Hastings
Preceded by George Gwozdecky	Spencer Penrose Award; 2005–06	Succeeded by Jeff Jackson
