= 1990 CCHA men's ice hockey tournament =

Sports tournament

1990 CCHA Men's ice hockey tournament
- Dates: March 2–10, 1990
- Teams: 8
- Finals site: Joe Louis Arena; Detroit, Michigan
- Champions: Michigan State (7th title)
- Winning coach: Ron Mason (10th title)
- MVP: Peter White (Michigan State)
- CCHA Men's Ice Hockey Tournaments

The 1990 CCHA Men's Ice Hockey Tournament was the 19th CCHA Men's Ice Hockey Tournament. It was played between March 2 and March 10, 1990. First round games were played at campus sites, while 'final four' games were played at Joe Louis Arena in Detroit, Michigan. By winning the tournament, Michigan State received the Central Collegiate Hockey Association's automatic bid to the 1990 NCAA Division I Men's Ice Hockey Tournament.

== Format ==
The tournament featured three rounds of play. The team that finished below eighth place in the standings was not eligible for postseason play. In the quarterfinals, the first and eighth seeds, the second and seventh seeds, the third seed and sixth seeds and the fourth seed and fifth seeds played a best-of-three series, with the winners advancing to the semifinals. In the semifinals, the remaining highest and lowest seeds and second highest and second lowest seeds play a single-game, with the winners advancing to the finals. The tournament champion receives an automatic bid to the 1990 NCAA Division I Men's Ice Hockey Tournament.

== Conference standings ==
Note: GP = Games played; W = Wins; L = Losses; T = Ties; PTS = Points; GF = Goals For; GA = Goals Against

1989–90 Central Collegiate Hockey Association standings
	Conference							Overall					
	GP	W	L	T	PTS	GF	GA	GP	W	L	T	GF	GA
Michigan State†*	32	26	3	3	55	190	93	45	35	7	3	251	138
Lake Superior State	32	24	6	2	50	169	91	46	33	10	3	246	138
Bowling Green	32	20	10	2	42	153	142	44	25	17	2	211	195
Michigan	32	16	11	5	37	148	125	42	24	12	6	199	151
Western Michigan	32	12	18	2	26	145	162	40	14	24	2	184	207
Ohio State	32	11	17	4	26	138	164	40	11	24	5	160	204
Miami	32	8	21	3	19	138	175	40	12	24	4	173	209
Ferris State	32	6	20	6	18	106	162	40	11	23	6	145	197
Illinois-Chicago	32	7	24	1	15	104	177	38	10	27	1	131	205
Championship: Michigan State † indicates conference regular season champion * indicates conference tournament champion

== Bracket ==
Quarterfinals; March 2–4
1	Michigan State	6	13	–
8	Ferris State	3	1	–
2	Lake Superior State	5	7	–
7	Miami	3	4	–
(Pairings are reseeded after the first round)
3	Bowling Green	7	6	–
6	Ohio State	1	5	–
4	Michigan	5	8	–
5	Western Michigan	3	2	–

Semifinals; March 8
1	Michigan State	4*
4	Michigan	3
2	Lake Superior State	4
3	Bowling Green	2

Championship; March 10
1	Michigan State	4
2	Lake Superior State	3
Consolation Game
3	Bowling Green	4
4	Michigan	5

Note: * denotes overtime period(s)

=== First round ===
==== (1) Michigan State vs. (8) Ferris State ====
Michigan State	6 – 4	Ferris State	Munn Ice Arena

Michigan State	13 – 1	Ferris State	Munn Ice Arena

Michigan State won series 2–0

==== (2) Lake Superior State vs. (7) Miami ====
Lake Superior State	5 – 3	Miami	Taffy Abel Arena

Lake Superior State	7 – 4	Miami	Taffy Abel Arena

Lake Superior State won series 2–0

==== (3) Bowling Green vs. (6) Ohio State ====
Bowling Green	7 – 1	Ohio State	BGSU Ice Arena

Bowling Green	6 – 5	Ohio State	BGSU Ice Arena

Bowling Green won series 2–0

==== (4) Michigan vs. (5) Western Michigan ====
Michigan	5 – 3	Western Michigan	Yost Ice Arena

Michigan	8 – 2	Western Michigan	Yost Ice Arena

Michigan won series 2–0

=== Semifinals ===
==== (1) Michigan State vs. (4) Michigan ====
March 8	Michigan State	4 – 3	OT	Michigan	Joe Louis Arena

==== (2) Lake Superior State vs. (3) Bowling Green ====
March 8	Lake Superior State	4 – 2	Bowling Green	Joe Louis Arena

=== Consolation Game ===
==== (3) Bowling Green vs. (4) Michigan ====
March 10	Bowling Green	4 – 5	Michigan	Joe Louis Arena

=== Championship ===
==== (1) Michigan State vs. (2) Lake Superior State ====
March 10	Michigan State	4 – 3	Lake Superior State	Joe Louis Arena

== Tournament awards ==
=== All-Tournament Team ===
- F Mark Ouimet (Michigan)
- F Jeff Jablonski (Lake Superior State)
- F Peter White* (Michigan State)
- D Kord Cernich (Lake Superior State)
- D Rob Blake (Bowling Green)
- G Jason Muzzatti (Michigan State)

* Most Valuable Player(s)
