= Sean Tallaire =

Canadian ice hockey player (1973–2024)

- Born: October 3, 1973 Steinbach, Manitoba, Canada
- Died: March 12, 2024 (aged 50) Pflugerville, Texas, U.S.
- Height: 5 ft 10 in (178 cm)
- Weight: 196 lb (89 kg; 14 st 0 lb)
- Position: Right wing
- Shot: Right
- Played for: IHL; Manitoba Moose; Grand Rapids Griffins; Cleveland Lumberjacks; Long Beach Ice Dogs; Utah Grizzlies; Kansas City Blades; DEL; Iserlohn Roosters; ERC Ingolstadt; Nürnberg Ice Tigers; Kölner Haie; Kassel Huskies
- NHL draft: 202nd overall, 1993; Vancouver Canucks
- Playing career: 1996–2010

Sean Michael Tallaire (October 3, 1973 – March 12, 2024) was a Canadian professional ice hockey player who played in the International Hockey League and the Deutsche Eishockey Liga (DEL).

== Career ==
Tallaire played college hockey at Lake Superior State University from 1992 to 1996. Tallaire was selected in the eight round, 202nd overall, by the Vancouver Canucks in the 1993 NHL Entry Draft. He was named the tournament MVP at the 1994 NCAA Championship Tournament, which was won by LSSU.

After college, Tallaire played in the International Hockey League from 1996 to 2001 with the Manitoba Moose, Grand Rapids Griffins, Cleveland Lumberjacks, Long Beach Ice Dogs, Utah Grizzlies, and Kansas City Blades. His best season came with the Grizzlies in 1999–2000, when he scored 31 goals and had 65 points. Aside from the IHL, Tallaire also had brief stints in the American Hockey League and Western Professional Hockey League.

In 2001, Tallaire went to Europe to play in Germany, joining the Iserlohn Roosters of the DEL. After one season with the Roosters, he played three years with the ERC Ingolstadt, interrupted by a season with the Nürnberg Ice Tigers. He signed a one-year contract with the Kölner Haie prior to the 2006–07 season, in which he was having his best season offensively before tearing his ACL midway through the season. After his recovery, Kölner Haie offered him another one-year contract for the following season, in which the Sharks were league runners up. Talliare signed with Kölner's rival, Kassel Huskies and played two seasons with them.

== Personal life and death ==
Tallaire married Jennifer Sorenson in August 1997. Together they had two sons, Carter (b. 1998) and Chase (b. 2002). Tallaire died in Pflugerville, Texas on March 12, 2024, at the age of 50.

== Career statistics ==
			Regular season					Playoffs
Season	Team	League	GP	G	A	Pts	PIM	GP	G	A	Pts	PIM
1992–93	Lake Superior State University	NCAA	43	26	26	52	26	—	—	—	—	—
1993–94	Lake Superior State University	NCAA	45	23	32	55	22	—	—	—	—	—
1994–95	Lake Superior State University	NCAA	41	21	28	49	38	—	—	—	—	—
1995–96	Lake Superior State University	NCAA	40	32	18	50	36	—	—	—	—	—
1996–97	Manitoba Moose	IHL	74	21	29	50	36	—	—	—	—	—
1997–98	Grand Rapids Griffins	IHL	73	13	17	30	65	—	—	—	—	—
1997–98	Cleveland Lumberjacks	IHL	7	1	1	2	4	10	2	2	4	4
1998–99	Central Texas Stampede	WPHL	2	1	3	4	0	—	—	—	—	—
1998–99	Grand Rapids Griffins	IHL	4	0	0	0	0	—	—	—	—	—
1998–99	Long Beach Ice Dogs	IHL	56	24	19	43	68	8	4	1	5	8
1998–99	Springfield Falcons	AHL	6	2	1	3	0	—	—	—	—	—
1999–00	Utah Grizzlies	IHL	82	31	34	65	85	5	0	0	0	10
2000–01	Kansas City Blades	IHL	80	23	28	51	44	—	—	—	—	—
2001–02	Iserlohn Roosters	DEL	60	22	21	43	38	—	—	—	—	—
2002–03	ERC Ingolstadt	DEL	52	18	17	35	68	—	—	—	—	—
2003–04	ERC Ingolstadt	DEL	52	12	20	32	54	9	1	5	6	2
2004–05	Nürnberg Ice Tigers	DEL	52	17	20	37	40	6	1	3	4	16
2005–06	ERC Ingolstadt	DEL	45	12	13	25	24	7	2	0	2	10
2006–07	Kölner Haie	DEL	30	12	11	23	28	—	—	—	—	—
2007–08	Kölner Haie	DEL	56	12	25	37	36	14	4	3	7	10
2008–09	Kassel Huskies	DEL	52	14	23	37	20	—	—	—	—	—
2009–10	Kassel Huskies	DEL	26	4	5	9	4	—	—	—	—	—
DEL totals			425	123	155	278	312	36	8	11	19	38

== Awards and honours ==
Award	Year
All-CCHA Rookie Team	1992–93
All-NCAA All-Tournament Team	1994
NCAA Tournament MVP	1994
All-CCHA First Team	1995–96
AHCA West Second-Team All-American	1995–96

Awards and achievements
Preceded by Jim Montgomery	NCAA Tournament Most Outstanding Player; 1994	Succeeded by Chris O'Sullivan
