= Clayton Beddoes =

Canadian ice hockey player and coach

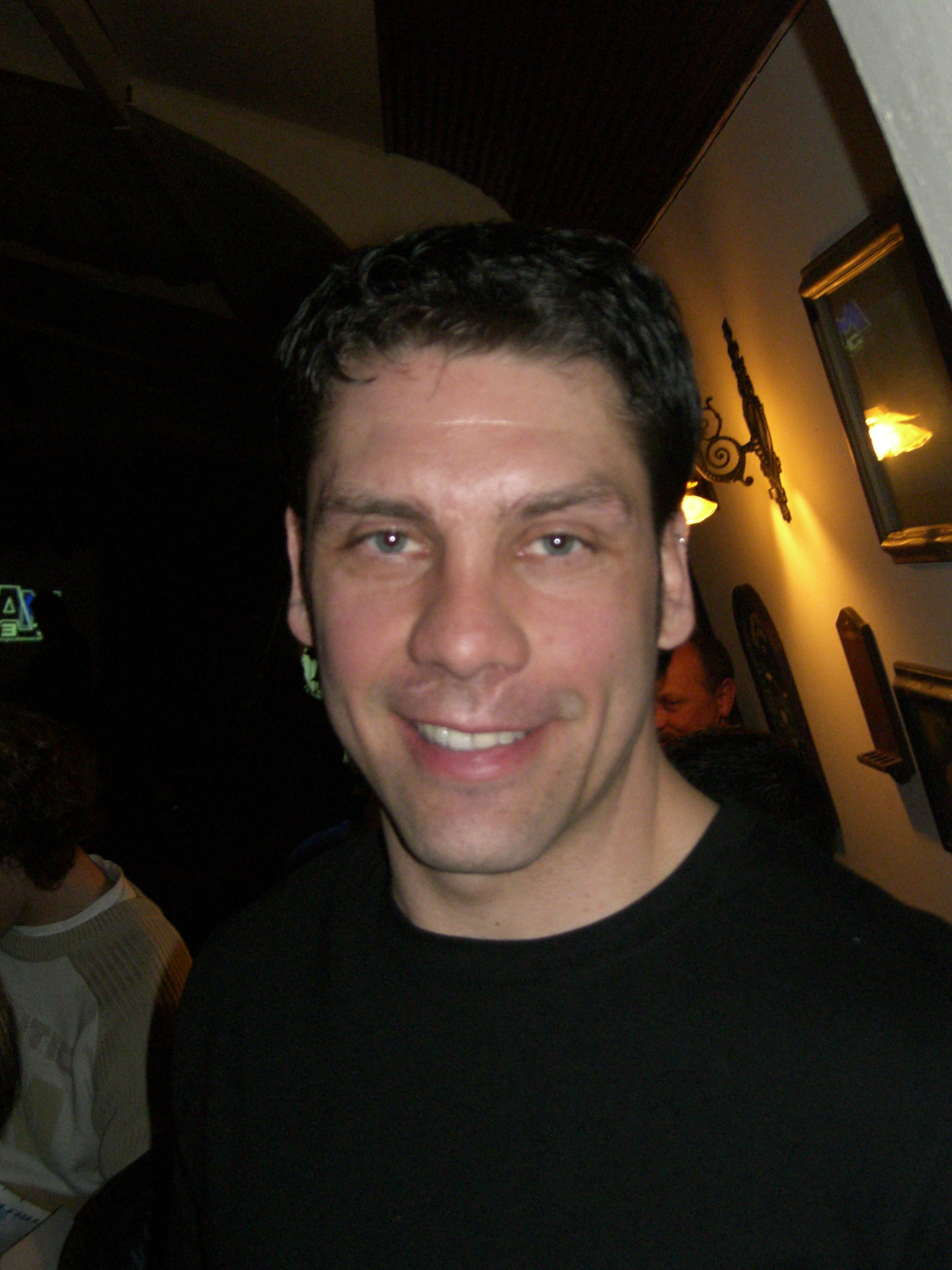
- Beddoes in 2006
- Born: November 10, 1970 (age 55) Bentley, Alberta, Canada
- Height: 5 ft 11 in (180 cm)
- Weight: 190 lb (86 kg; 13 st 8 lb)
- Position: Centre
- Shot: Left
- Played for: Boston Bruins
- NHL draft: Undrafted
- Playing career: 1994–2002

Clayton Beddoes (born November 10, 1970) is a Canadian ice hockey coach and former professional ice hockey centre. He played two seasons in the National Hockey League. He is currently an assistant coach for the Seattle Torrent of the Professional Women's Hockey League (PWHL), and has coached the Italian national team at two World Championships.

== Playing career ==
He spent four years playing college ice hockey at Lake Superior State University between 1990 and 1994, earning All-NCAA Second Team honors along with NCAA's Championship All-Tournament Team and All-CCHA Second Team distinction his senior year. He also served as the Lakers' team captain in his final year at LSSU.

Beddoes was signed as a free agent by the Boston Bruins in 1994 and spent the 1994–95 season with the team's AHL affiliate, the Providence Bruins. He played sixty career NHL games between 1995 and 1997, scoring two goals and eight assists for ten points.

Beddoes scored his first NHL goal on December 2, 1995, in Boston's 6–4 home victory over the Buffalo Sabres.

After spending the 1997–98 season with the Detroit Vipers of the International Hockey League (65 games: 22 goals, 24 assists), Beddoes signed with the Berlin Capitals of the German elite league Deutsche Eishockey Liga (DEL) in 1998. He made 52 appearances for the Capitals in the 1998-99 DEL season, tallying 17 goals, while assisting on 26 more.

He spent two more years in the German top-flight, playing for Adler Mannheim and Düsseldorfer EG. He split his last season as a professional athlete (2001–02) between WCHL's Anchorage Aces and Italian team WSV Sterzing. In 2002, Beddoes had to put an end to his playing career due to shoulder issues.

== Coaching career ==
After his retirement in 2002, he began a coaching career in Germany. He served one year as assistant coach of DEL's Iserlohn Roosters (2005–06), followed by a two-year stint in the same position at fellow DEL side Kölner Haie. In September 2008, he was promoted to the head coaching job after the Haie organization had sacked Doug Mason, but was relieved of his duties after only 71 days in that position. He then joined the Frankfurt Lions' coaching staff as an assistant for 2009–10. After the Lions' organization had withdrawn from the German top-flight and made a fresh start in the third-division, Beddoes took over as head coach in 2010–11.

He later embarked on a two-year stint as head coach of Italian Serie A club SG Cortina.

The 2014–15 season saw him serve as skill and development coach for the Red Deer Rebels in the WHL.

In April 2015, Beddoes was named head coach of WSV Sterzing, returning to the Serie A and the club where he spent the last days of his playing career. In July 2017, he was named assistant coach at ERC Ingolstadt of the German DEL and stayed at the job until the end of the 2017–18 season.

On September 28, 2017, he was appointed as head coach of the Italian men's national team.

On March 11, 2019, just before the beginning of the EBEL playoffs, Beddoes was named head coach of Italian team HC Bolzano.

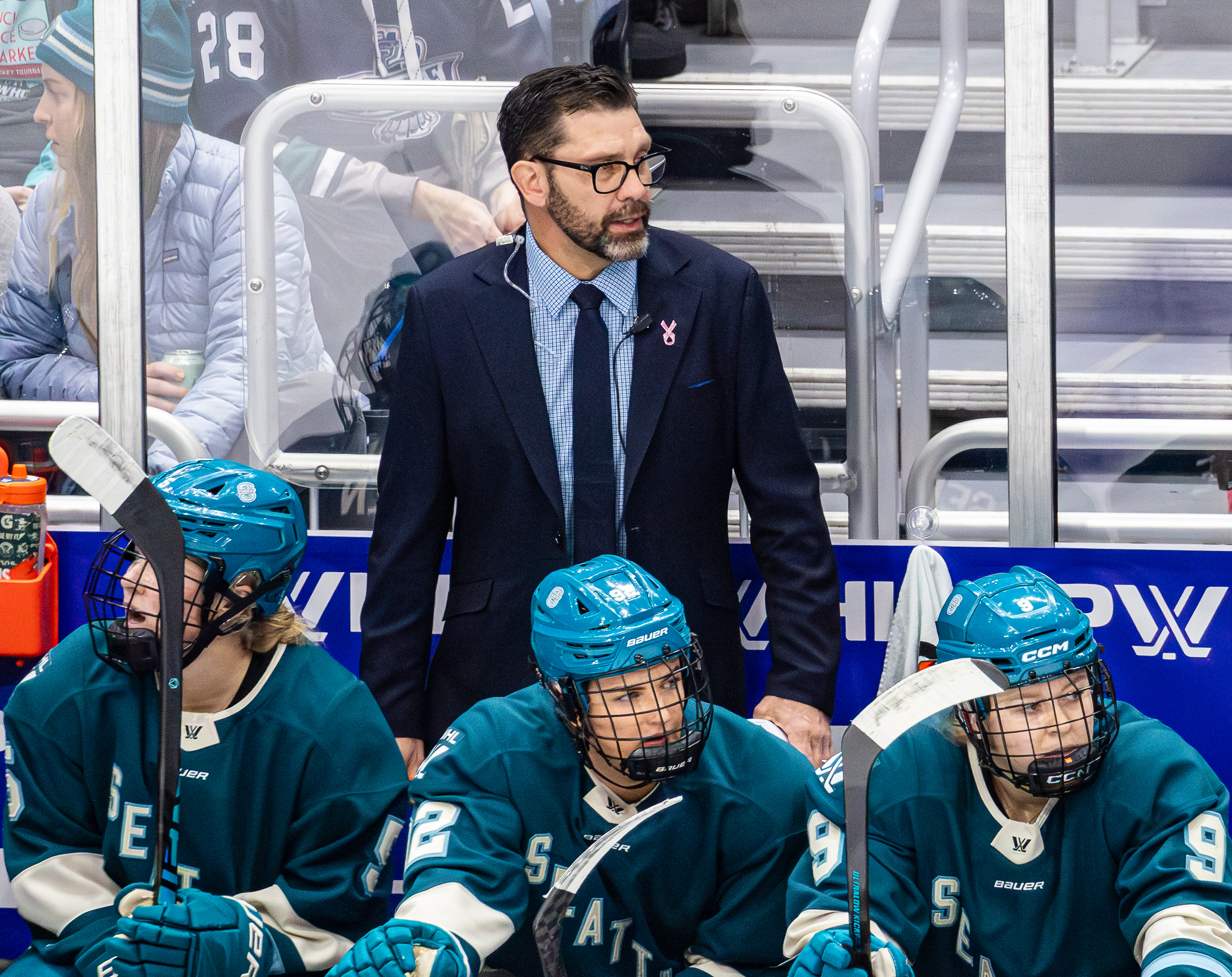
Beddoes coaching the Seattle Torrent in 2025

On July 20, 2023, Beddoes was announced as an assistant coach for the Red Deer Rebels.

On August 21, 2025, Beddoes was announced as an assistant coach for the expansion Seattle Torrent of the PWHL.

== Career statistics ==
=== Regular season and playoffs ===
| | | | Regular season | | | | | Playoffs |
| Season | Team | League | GP | G | A | Pts | PIM | GP | G | A | Pts | PIM |
|---|---|---|---|---|---|---|---|---|---|---|---|---|
| 1988–89 | Red Deer Rustlers | AJHL | 60 | 18 | 38 | 56 | 115 | — | — | — | — | — |
| 1989–90 | Weyburn Red Wings | SJHL | 63 | 34 | 60 | 94 | 69 | 13 | 7 | 6 | 13 | 10 |
| 1990–91 | Lake Superior State University | CCHA | 45 | 14 | 28 | 42 | 26 | — | — | — | — | — |
| 1991–92 | Lake Superior State University | CCHA | 38 | 14 | 26 | 40 | 24 | — | — | — | — | — |
| 1992–93 | Lake Superior State University | CCHA | 45 | 18 | 40 | 58 | 30 | — | — | — | — | — |
| 1993–94 | Lake Superior State University | CCHA | 44 | 23 | 31 | 54 | 56 | — | — | — | — | — |
| 1994–95 | Providence Bruins | AHL | 65 | 16 | 20 | 36 | 39 | 13 | 3 | 1 | 4 | 18 |
| 1995–96 | Boston Bruins | NHL | 39 | 1 | 6 | 7 | 44 | — | — | — | — | — |
| 1995–96 | Providence Bruins | AHL | 32 | 10 | 15 | 25 | 24 | 4 | 2 | 3 | 5 | 0 |
| 1996–97 | Boston Bruins | NHL | 21 | 1 | 2 | 3 | 13 | — | — | — | — | — |
| 1996–97 | Providence Bruins | AHL | 36 | 11 | 23 | 34 | 60 | 7 | 2 | 0 | 2 | 4 |
| 1997–98 | Detroit Vipers | IHL | 65 | 22 | 24 | 46 | 63 | 22 | 5 | 10 | 15 | 16 |
| 1998–99 | Berlin Capitals | DEL | 52 | 17 | 26 | 43 | 12 | — | — | — | — | — |
| 1999–00 | Adler Mannheim | DEL | 46 | 13 | 12 | 25 | 41 | 5 | 1 | 0 | 1 | 12 |
| 2000–01 | Düsseldorfer EG | DEL | 22 | 2 | 3 | 5 | 6 | — | — | — | — | — |
| 2001–02 | Anchorage Aces | WCHL | 5 | 1 | 4 | 5 | 8 | — | — | — | — | — |
| 2001–02 | WSV Sterzing Broncos | ITA | 13 | 6 | 10 | 16 | 6 | — | — | — | — | — |
| AHL totals | | | 133 | 37 | 58 | 95 | 123 | 24 | 7 | 4 | 11 | 22 |
| NHL totals | | | 60 | 2 | 8 | 10 | 57 | — | — | — | — | — |

== Awards and honours ==
| Award | Year |
|---|---|
| All-CCHA Rookie Team | 1990–91 |
| All-CCHA Second Team | 1993–94 |
| AHCA West Second-Team All-American | 1993–94 |
| All-NCAA All-Tournament Team | 1994 |

Awards and achievements
| Preceded by Peter White | CCHA Most Valuable Player in Tournament; 1991 | Succeeded by Darrin Madeley |
