= Steve Barnes (ice hockey) =

Canadian ice hockey player

- Born: July 19, 1970 (age 56) Gravenhurst, Ontario, Canada
- Height: 5 ft 11 in (180 cm)
- Weight: 190 lb (86 kg; 13 st 8 lb)
- Position: Defence
- Shot: Right
- Played for: ECHL; Toledo Storm; Huntington Blizzard; UHL; Port Huron Border Cats; BHL; Manchester Storm; BISL; Nottingham Panthers
- NHL draft: Undrafted
- Playing career: 1994–2000

Steve Barnes (born July 19, 1970) is a Canadian former professional ice hockey defenceman.

Barnes attended Lake Superior State University where he played NCAA college hockey from 1990 to 1994 with the Lake Superior State Lakers, scoring 16 goals and 96 assists for 112 points while earning 14 penalty minutes in 169 games played.

Barnes went on to play six years of professional hockey, including the 1996–97 season when he won the BH Cup as a member of the Manchester Storm. He retired following the 1999–2000 season spent with the Port Huron Border Cats of the United Hockey League.

== Awards and honours ==
Award	Year
All-CCHA Second Team	1991-92
All-NCAA All-Tournament Team	1994
