= Brian Farrell (ice hockey) =

American ice hockey player (born 1972)

- Born: April 16, 1972 (age 54) Hartford, Connecticut, U.S.
- Height: 6 ft 01 in (185 cm)
- Weight: 206 lb (93 kg; 14 st 10 lb)
- Position: Left wing
- Shot: Left
- Played for: Chicago Wolves; Cleveland Lumberjacks; Fort Wayne Komets; Jacksonville Lizard Kings; Mississippi Sea Wolves; Springfield Falcons; Tallahassee Tiger Sharks; Toledo Storm; Utah Grizzlies
- NHL draft: 89th overall, 1990; Pittsburgh Penguins
- Playing career: 1994–2002

Brian Farrell (born April 16, 1972) is an American retired professional hockey player. He was drafted by the Pittsburgh Penguins in the fifth-round of the 1990 NHL entry draft.

== Early life ==
Farrell was born in Hartford, Connecticut. He attended Avon Old Farms, a boarding school in Avon, Connecticut. During an alumni game in 2007, he was once "traded" to an opposing team (Team Diogenes), but responded by scoring a hat trick against his old team.

== Career ==
Farrell started his career at Harvard University in 1990, where he scored 11 points in 29 games. During that summer, the Pittsburgh Penguins made him their fifth-round selection (89th overall) in the 1990 NHL entry draft. Farrell remained at Harvard until his senior season in 1993–94, where he led the ECAC in goals scored (29 goals in 33 games), outscoring future NHL players Craig Conroy, Steve Martins, and Eric Perrin.

Farrell played professionally from 1994 until 1999 in the ECHL and AHL, before leaving the United States to play a single season with TEV Miesbach, a third-tier team in Germany's Oberliga. Farrell would later return to Germany to finish his career with the ERSC Amberg in Germany's fourth tier Regionalliga. Farrell retired after the 2001–02 Regionalliga season.

Since his retirement, Farrell has worked as a hockey coach at Renbrook School in West Hartford, Connecticut. He is also an instructor at the Renbrook Summer Hockey Clinic.

== Awards and honors ==
Award	Year
All-ECAC Hockey First Team	1993–94
