= Mike Pomichter =

American ice hockey player

- Born: September 10, 1973 (age 53) New Haven, Connecticut, U.S.
- Height: 6 ft 1 in (185 cm)
- Weight: 212 lb (96 kg; 15 st 2 lb)
- Position: Left wing
- Shot: Left
- Played for: Boston University; Indianapolis Ice; Cornwall Aces; Portland Pirates; St. John's Maple Leafs; Jacksonville Lizard Kings; Chicago Wolves; Baltimore Bandits; Springfield Falcons; Cincinnati Mighty Ducks; Saginaw Gears; Wilkes-Barre/Scranton Penguins; New Haven Knights; Manchester Monarchs; Delaware Federals; Pennsylvania Blues; Danbury Titans
- National team: United States
- NHL draft: 39th overall, 1991; Chicago Blackhawks
- Playing career: 1991–2016

Mike Pomichter is an American ice hockey coach and former left wing who was an All-American for Boston University.

== Career ==
Pomichter was a highly rated prospect and was selected in the second round of the 1991 NHL Draft. He began attending Boston University the following fall and played well for the hockey team. Pomichter finished second in scoring for the Terriers as a freshman and helped the team earn a berth in the NCAA Tournament. His numbers declined slightly as sophomore but Pomichter missed a few games to play for Team USA at the World Junior Championships. While BU finished 2nd in the Hockey East standings and tournament once more, they were still afforded the second eastern seed for the NCAA Tournament. They handled Northern Michigan in the quarterfinals to make the Frozen Four but were soundly defeated in the national semifinal. While the season didn't end as they would have liked, BU was the only team to beat Maine that season, preventing their conference rival from posting an undefeated record.

In Pomichter's junior season he began showing the talent that led him to be a second-round pick. He led the Terriers in scoring by 10 points and led the team to a program record 34 wins. Pomichter was named an All-American and helped BU win a conference title, enabling the team to receive the top eastern seed in the NCAA tournament. The Terriers won their first two games by identical 4–1 margins and reached the championship game. They faced off against a surprising Lake Superior State who had knocked them out the year before and were looking for a measure of revenge. Instead, BU was stunned by a dominating performance and were handed the worst championship defeat in over 30 years. Pomichter assisted on Boston University's only goal of the game and ended up as the runner-up after a 1–9 loss.

Despite having a year of eligibility remaining, Pomichter left school in 1994 and began his professional career. He spent his entire first season with the Indianapolis Ice but didn't produce anything like he would have wanted. Despite the low offensive numbers, Pomichter joined the US national team for the World Championships. He helped the team finish atop their bracket but they lost their quarterfinal match and finished the tournament in 6th place. The following season, Pomichter's right were traded to the Toronto Maple Leafs and he began a life as a hockey vagabond. For four consecutive years, Pomichter played for at least three different teams, wearing 10 different uniforms across 4 minor leagues. His last real chance at an NHL stint came with a 25-game tryout contract with the expansion Wilkes-Barre/Scranton Penguins but he was released after 16 games. Pomichter returned to the United Hockey League the following year and retired in 2002.

After 9 years away from the game, Pomichter returned for a handful of games in the Federal Hockey League. After his final game in 2016, Pomichter turned to coaching, appearing as an assistant for the New England Prospects in the 2019 Quebec pee-wee tournament.

== Statistics ==
=== Regular season and playoffs ===
			Regular Season					Playoffs
Season	Team	League	GP	G	A	Pts	PIM	GP	G	A	Pts	PIM
1991–92	Boston University	Hockey East	35	11	27	38	14	—	—	—	—	—
1992–93	Boston University	Hockey East	30	16	14	30	23	—	—	—	—	—
1993–94	Boston University	Hockey East	40	28	26	54	37	—	—	—	—	—
1994–95	Indianapolis Ice	IHL	76	13	9	22	47	—	—	—	—	—
1995–96	Indianapolis Ice	IHL	4	0	0	0	0	—	—	—	—	—
1995–96	Cornwall Aces	AHL	6	0	1	1	0	—	—	—	—	—
1995–96	Portland Pirates	AHL	2	0	0	0	0	—	—	—	—	—
1995–96	St. John's Maple Leafs	AHL	19	2	4	6	4	—	—	—	—	—
1996–97	Chicago Wolves	IHL	2	0	0	0	0	—	—	—	—	—
1996–97	Jacksonville Lizard Kings	ECHL	61	37	40	77	26	—	—	—	—	—
1996–97	Baltimore Bandits	AHL	4	2	1	3	4	3	0	0	0	0
1997–98	Jacksonville Lizard Kings	ECHL	3	5	0	5	2	—	—	—	—	—
1997–98	Springfield Falcons	AHL	20	7	6	13	14	—	—	—	—	—
1997–98	Cincinnati Mighty Ducks	AHL	26	6	8	14	18	—	—	—	—	—
1998–99	Jacksonville Lizard Kings	ECHL	33	10	18	28	31	2	1	2	3	0
1998–99	Cincinnati Mighty Ducks	AHL	25	2	2	4	14	—	—	—	—	—
1998–99	Saginaw Gears	UHL	10	8	2	10	0	—	—	—	—	—
1999–00	Wilkes-Barre/Scranton Penguins	AHL	16	1	2	3	11	—	—	—	—	—
2000–01	Springfield Falcons	AHL	1	0	0	0	2	—	—	—	—	—
2000–01	New Haven Knights	UHL	71	31	25	56	47	8	0	6	6	0
2001–02	Manchester Monarchs	AHL	1	0	0	0	0	—	—	—	—	—
2001–02	New Haven Knights	UHL	58	16	30	46	37	3	0	2	2	0
2011–12	Delaware Federals	FHL	2	3	1	4	0	—	—	—	—	—
2012–13	Pennsylvania Blues	FHL	3	1	5	6	0	—	—	—	—	—
2015–16	Delaware Federals	FHL	1	0	0	0	0	—	—	—	—	—
NCAA totals			105	55	67	122	74	—	—	—	—	—
AHL totals			120	20	24	44	67	3	0	0	0	0
IHL totals			82	13	9	22	47	—	—	—	—	—
ECHL totals			97	52	58	110	59	2	1	2	3	0
UHL totals			139	55	57	112	84	11	0	8	8	2
FHL totals			6	4	6	10	0	—	—	—	—	—

=== International ===
Year	Team	Event	Result	GP	G	A	Pts	PIM
1993	United States	WJC	4th	7	0	2	2	4
1995	United States	WC	6th	6	1	2	3	2

== Awards and honors ==
Award	Year
AHCA East First-Team All-American	1993–94
All-NCAA All-Tournament Team	1994
