= J. P. McKersie =

American ice hockey player

- Born: January 23, 1972 (age 54) Madison, Wisconsin, USA
- Height: 6 ft 1 in (185 cm)
- Weight: 210 lb (95 kg; 15 st 0 lb)
- Position: Goaltender
- Played for: Boston University; South Carolina Stingrays
- NHL draft: 239th overall, 1990; Minnesota North Stars
- Playing career: 1991–1997

John P. McKersie is an American ice hockey coach and former goaltender who was an All-American for Boston University.

== Career ==
McKersie was selected by the Minnesota North Stars after graduating high school in 1990. After a further year of junior hockey with the Dubuque Fighting Saints, he began attending Boston University. He spent his freshman year as a backup, third on the Terriers' depth chart behind Scott Cashman and Derek Herlofsky. The two older goalies split starting duties in 1993, preventing McKersie from getting any time in net for BU. After Cashman graduated, his minutes went to McKersie in 1994 and the junior netminder took full advantage. McKersie went 19–4 during the season and was one of the main reasons for Boston University finishing atop the Hockey East standings. McKersie was named an All-American and backstopped the team all the way to the championship game. Unfortunately, Herlofsky got the start in goal and McKersie was forced to watch as his team imploded against Lake Superior State. By the time he got into the net the game was already out of hand and BU ended up losing the match 1–9.

During the summer of 1994, McKersie was struck by a car while cycling. He was in a coma for 6 days and left with severe injuries. McKersie would miss the entire 1994-95 season while recovering but he was able to watch his teammates go on to win the 1995 National Championship. After extensive rehab, McKersie returned to the lineup in December 1995 and finished out his college career with 7 games. McKersie attempted to pursue a professional career but lasted only 3 games in the ECHL before retiring as a player.

Still wanting to remain in the game, McKersie turned to coaching and became a goaltending specialist for the women's programs at Holy Cross, Boston College and Harvard. in 1995 he founded his own goaltending school, JPGoalie, and continued to serve as president of the business as of 2021.

== Statistics ==
=== Regular season and playoffs ===
			Regular season									Playoffs
Season	Team	League	GP	W	L	T	MIN	GA	SO	GAA	SV%	GP	W	L	MIN	GA	SO	GAA	SV%
1990–91	Dubuque Fighting Saints	USHL	29	—	—	—	—	—	—	—	—	—	—	—	—	—	—	—	—
1991–92	Boston University	Hockey East	8	3	2	1	396	23	0	3.48	.866	—	—	—	—	—	—	—	—
1992–93	Boston University	Hockey East	—	—	—	—	—	—	—	—	—	—	—	—	—	—	—	—	—
1993–94	Boston University	Hockey East	24	19	4	0	1325	64	0	2.90	—	—	—	—	—	—	—	—	—
1995–96	Boston University	Hockey East	7	1	1	0	149	5	0	2.01	—	—	—	—	—	—	—	—	—
1996–97	South Carolina Stingrays	ECHL	3	1	0	0	96	9	0	5.60	.827	—	—	—	—	—	—	—	—
NCAA totals			39	23	7	1	1870	92	0	2.95	—	—	—	—	—	—	—	—	—

== Awards and honors ==
Award	Year
AHCA East Second-Team All-American	1993–94
