= Rob Valicevic =

American ice hockey player (born 1971)

- Born: January 6, 1971 (age 55) Detroit, Michigan, USA
- Height: 6 ft 1 in (185 cm)
- Weight: 195 lb (88 kg; 13 st 13 lb)
- Position: Right wing
- Shot: Right
- Played for: Nashville Predators; Los Angeles Kings; Mighty Ducks of Anaheim; Dallas Stars; TPS; ERC Ingolstadt
- NHL draft: 114th overall, 1991; New York Islanders
- Playing career: 1995–2008

Robert “Big Rob” Valicevic (born January 6, 1971) is an American former professional ice hockey player. He played six seasons in the National Hockey League, playing with four teams between 1998 and 2004, and also spent several years in various minor and European leagues during his career, which lasted from 1995 to 2008.

== Playing career ==
Born in Detroit, Michigan, Valicevic has Croatian ancestry. He was drafted in the 6th round (114th overall) of the 1991 NHL entry draft by the New York Islanders. He spent four seasons playing with Lake Superior State University in the NCAA from 1991 to 1995 before turning pro in the 1995–96 season. Over that period of time, he recorded 57 goals, 66 assists and 123 points in 161 games. He then moved to the East Coast Hockey League (ECHL) for the 1995–96 season where he played 60 games with the Louisiana IceGators, scoring 62 points and earning a call-up to the Springfield Falcons of the AHL for two games. He played 8 more games for the IceGators during the 1996–97 season before joining the Houston Aeros of the IHL where he played until 1999, when he earned a spot with the Nashville Predators, playing 19 games in the 1998–99 season.

He spent the next two seasons in the NHL as well, before signing with the Los Angeles Kings organization in August 2001. He spent one season with the Kings, playing only 19 NHL games, the rest of the season spent with the Manchester Monarchs of the AHL. In July 2002, Valicevic signed with the Mighty Ducks of Anaheim organization, with similar results to those in Los Angeles, playing most of the 2002–03 season with the Cincinnati Mighty Ducks of the AHL. Valicevic was again a free agent following the 2002–03 season, this time signing with the Dallas Stars, again with little success in the 2003–04 season, playing only 7 games with the Stars, the rest spent with the Utah Grizzlies.

Valicevic then moved to the UHL, and played the 2004–05 season with the Flint Generals before moving to Europe, where he had a short stay with TPS. He then went to Germany to play with ERC Ingolstadt of the DEL. He spent 2005–06 and 2006–07 with Ingolstadt and last played for EC KAC of the Erste Bank Eishockey Liga, retiring after the 2007–08 season.

=== Regular season and playoffs ===
			Regular season					Playoffs
Season	Team	League	GP	G	A	Pts	PIM	GP	G	A	Pts	PIM
1990–91	Detroit Compuware Ambassadors	NAHL	39	31	44	75	54	—	—	—	—	—
1991–92	Lake Superior State University	CCHA	36	8	4	12	12	—	—	—	—	—
1992–93	Lake Superior State University	CCHA	43	21	20	41	28	—	—	—	—	—
1993–94	Lake Superior State University	CCHA	45	18	20	38	46	—	—	—	—	—
1994–95	Lake Superior State University	CCHA	37	10	22	32	40	—	—	—	—	—
1995–96	Springfield Falcons	AHL	2	0	0	0	2	—	—	—	—	—
1995–96	Louisiana IceGators	ECHL	60	42	20	62	85	5	2	3	5	8
1996–97	Louisiana IceGators	ECHL	8	7	2	9	21	—	—	—	—	—
1996–97	Houston Aeros	IHL	58	11	12	23	42	12	1	3	4	11
1997–98	Houston Aeros	IHL	72	29	28	57	47	4	2	0	2	2
1998–99	Houston Aeros	IHL	57	16	33	49	62	19	7	10	17	8
1998–99	Nashville Predators	NHL	19	4	2	6	2	—	—	—	—	—
1999–00	Nashville Predators	NHL	80	14	11	25	21	—	—	—	—	—
2000–01	Nashville Predators	NHL	60	8	6	14	26	—	—	—	—	—
2001–02	Manchester Monarchs	AHL	59	11	23	34	25	5	1	0	1	4
2001–02	Los Angeles Kings	NHL	17	1	1	2	8	—	—	—	—	—
2002–03	Cincinnati Mighty Ducks	AHL	69	17	26	43	38	—	—	—	—	—
2002–03	Mighty Ducks of Anaheim	NHL	10	1	0	1	2	—	—	—	—	—
2003–04	Utah Grizzlies	AHL	67	11	26	37	44	—	—	—	—	—
2003–04	Dallas Stars	NHL	7	0	0	0	0	—	—	—	—	—
2004–05	TPS	FIN	10	1	1	2	29	—	—	—	—	—
2004–05	Flint Generals	UHL	78	36	60	96	38	—	—	—	—	—
2005–06	ERC Ingolstadt	DEL	46	12	18	30	28	—	—	—	—	—
2006–07	ERC Ingolstadt	DEL	51	15	27	42	56	6	3	2	5	12
2007–08	Klagenfurter AC	EBEL	24	8	15	23	26	3	0	1	1	0
AHL totals			197	39	75	114	109	5	1	0	1	4
IHL totals			187	56	73	129	151	35	10	13	23	21
NHL totals			193	28	20	48	61	—	—	—	—	—

== Awards and honors ==
Award	Year
CCHA All-Tournament Team	1993

- 2004–05 UHL Second All-Star Team
