= Mike Matteucci =

Canadian ice hockey player

- Born: December 27, 1971 (age 53); Trail, British Columbia, Canada
- Height: 6 ft 03 in (191 cm)
- Weight: 210 lb (95 kg; 15 st 0 lb)
- Position: Defence
- Shot: Left
- Played for: Minnesota Wild
- NHL draft: Undrafted
- Playing career: 1996–2004

Michael Matteucci (born December 27, 1971) is a Canadian former professional ice hockey defenceman. He played 6 games in the National Hockey League with the Minnesota Wild between 2000 and 2002.

== Playing career ==
Matteucci played four seasons of collegiate hockey at Lake Superior State University from 1992–93 to 1995–96, and was a member of the Lakers' championship team in 1994.

Undrafted after college, Matteucci played for the Long Beach Ice Dogs of the International Hockey League from 1996 to 2000. With the Ice Dogs, he became a fan favorite as an enforcer. In his four-plus seasons with the Ice Dogs, Matteucci racked up more than 900 penalty minutes.

Following his time with the Ice Dogs, Matteucci signed with the Minnesota Wild. He played 6 NHL games for the Wild in the 2000–01 and 2001–02 seasons. He spent most of the 2000–01 season with the IHL Cleveland Lumberjacks, and most of 2001–02 with the AHL Houston Aeros, where he served as team captain.

Matteucci signed a free agent contract with the New Jersey Devils in 2002, and spent the next two seasons as captain of the Albany River Rats, New Jersey's AHL affiliate. He then moved on to the Milwaukee Admirals.

Matteucci announced his retirement from the Admirals on December 4, 2004.

== Post-playing career ==
In 2014, Matteucci was inducted into the Lake Superior State Athletic Hall of Fame, along with his 1994 championship team.

He currently lives with his wife and two children in Traverse City, Michigan. Matteucci coaches for the Bay Reps and Traverse City North Stars. Matteucci is also a detective with the Grand Traverse County Sheriff's Department.

== Career statistics ==
=== Regular season and playoffs ===
			Regular season					Playoffs
Season	Team	League	GP	G	A	Pts	PIM	GP	G	A	Pts	PIM
1990–91	Estevan Bruins	SJHL	62	5	16	21	226	—	—	—	—	—
1991–92	Estevan Bruins	SJHL	63	9	35	44	141	—	—	—	—	—
1992–93	Lake Superior State University	CCHA	19	1	3	4	16	—	—	—	—	—
1993–94	Lake Superior State University	CCHA	45	6	11	17	64	—	—	—	—	—
1994–95	Lake Superior State University	CCHA	38	3	11	14	52	—	—	—	—	—
1995–96	Lake Superior State University	CCHA	40	3	13	16	82	—	—	—	—	—
1995–96	Long Beach Ice Dogs	IHL	4	0	0	0	7	—	—	—	—	—
1996–97	Long Beach Ice Dogs	IHL	81	4	4	8	254	18	0	1	1	42
1997–98	Long Beach Ice Dogs	IHL	79	1	7	8	258	17	0	2	2	57
1998–99	Long Beach Ice Dogs	IHL	79	3	9	12	253	8	0	1	1	12
1999–00	Long Beach Ice Dogs	IHL	64	0	4	4	170	6	0	0	0	16
2000–01	Minnesota Wild	NHL	3	0	0	0	2	—	—	—	—	—
2000–01	Cleveland Lumberjacks	IHL	69	0	7	7	189	4	0	0	0	15
2001–02	Minnesota Wild	NHL	3	0	0	0	2	—	—	—	—	—
2001–02	Houston Aeros	AHL	69	3	10	13	128	14	1	1	2	33
2002–03	Albany River Rats	AHL	68	1	3	4	133	—	—	—	—	—
2003–04	Albany River Rats	AHL	73	1	12	13	107	—	—	—	—	—
2004–05	Milwaukee Admirals	AHL	15	1	1	2	45	—	—	—	—	—
IHL totals			376	8	31	39	1131	53	0	4	4	142
NHL totals			6	0	0	0	4	—	—	—	—	—

Awards and achievements
Preceded by Steve Halko	CCHA Best Defensive Defenseman; 1995-96	Succeeded by Tyler Harlton
