= Mike Morin (ice hockey) =

Canadian ice hockey player (born 1971)

- Born: July 20, 1971 (age 55) Melville, Saskatchewan, Canada
- Height: 6 ft 0 in (183 cm)
- Weight: 194 lb (88 kg; 13 st 12 lb)
- Position: Forward
- Shot: Left
- Played for: Manchester Storm
- Playing career: 1991–2004

Mike Morin (born July 20, 1971) is a Canadian former professional ice hockey player. Morin currently resides in Manchester, England and is the Assistant Coach for the Manchester Storm.

== Early career ==
Born in Melville, Saskatchewan, Morin began his career at NCAA level, playing for Lake Superior State University. Morin was a regular and reliable first team player, icing in 165 games in four seasons and scoring 129 points in the process.

Morin then made the transition to professional standard ice hockey, signing for the ECHL team, the Richmond Renegades. Again he would produce an excellent points output, with 38 points scored in just 47 appearances. Unfortunately the Renegades failed to qualify for the post-season. Morin would step up a level for the following season, 1995/96, and would line up as a Providence Bruins player. Although not a regular first teamer at the higher level, Morin would play 25 times during the regular season as well as making a handful of post-season appearances. In 1996, Morin would also briefly play roller hockey in the RHI for the San Jose Rhinos before returning to the more familiar ice surface for the following season.

== Move to UK Ice Hockey ==
=== Manchester Storm ===
Mike Morin made a surprising decision for the season of 1996-1997 to move to Europe. He then signed with the Manchester Storm, which was an equally celebrated team locally. The Storms played in the Ice Hockey Superleague, which was popular amongst the fans.Through the account of some unconfirmed reports, Morin proved himself to be somewhat of an 'unsung hero for the Storms.

Morin showed loyalty to the Storm, playing for them for six seasons in total, up until the end of the 2001/02 season when his contract was not renewed by then head coach Daryl Lipsey. Morin's work rate, effort and physical style combined with his loyalty to the organisation meant that he was firmly established as a 'fan favourite' in Manchester by the time of his departure, with many fans calling for a testimonial game.

=== BNL and Sheffield Steelers ===
After his contract was not renewed, Morin took the opportunity to sign for the Hull Thunder, a team icing in the British National League, generally regarded as the league below the ISL. Morin's experience at the higher level served him well as he scored 17 points in 22 games. It would be a brief spell in the BNL for Morin as he would be signed, part way through the season by the ISL Sheffield Steelers. It was a move that many saw as controversial due to the intense rivalry between the Storm and the Steelers, often referred to as the 'War of the Roses'.

=== Manchester Phoenix ===
Morin was released by the Steelers in 2003, and was promptly re-signed with the newly established Manchester Phoenix organisation - he was in fact head coach Rick Brebant's first signing. The Phoenix had been established following the collapse of the Manchester Storm in 2003 due to off-ice financial problems. The 2003/04 season would be the Phoenix's first competitive season and it would be in the Elite Ice Hockey League, which was formed after the gradual meltdown of the ISL. Morin re-claimed his place as fan favourite in Manchester and was installed as alternate captain as a recognition for his years of service to ice hockey in Manchester. Morin is one of a handful of players to have played for both Manchester Storm and Manchester Phoenix.

At the end of the 2003/04 season, the Phoenix franchise would be temporarily suspended, again due to financial costs. This prompted Morin to declare his retirement from the game. Morin is still a widely popular figure in U.K. ice hockey, especially in Manchester, where he is regarded as one of the most respected players to play professional standard ice hockey in the city.

== Move into Coaching ==
On 24 November 2015, it was announced that Morin would be returning to the Manchester Storm as Assistant Coach. Morin remains in this position as of the 2024/25 season. Morin stepped in as Manchester Storm interim coach in late 2024, following the departure of head coach Mike Flanagan.

== Shirt Retirement ==
At the end of the 2016/17 season, it was announced by the Manchester Storm organisation that Morin's number 15 shirt would be shirt retirement for services to Manchester Storm both as a player and assistant coach. The shirt retirement took place on 12 November 2017 prior to a match against Milton Keynes Lightning.

== Career statistics ==
			Regular season					Playoffs				
Season	Team	League	GP	G	A	Pts	PIM	GP	G	A	Pts	PIM
1991–92	Lake Superior State University	NCAA	37	10	5	15	26	-	-	-	-	-
1992–93	Lake Superior State University	NCAA	43	16	25	41	68	-	-	-	-	-
1993–94	Lake Superior State University	NCAA	44	12	25	37	75	-	-	-	-	-
1994–95	Lake Superior State University	NCAA	41	19	17	36	116	-	-	-	-	-
1995–96	Richmond Renegades	ECHL	41	21	17	38	47	-	-	-	-	-
1995–96	Providence Bruins	AHL	25	4	5	9	10	3	1	0	1	6
1996–97	Manchester Storm	ISL	39	16	17	33	38	6	1	1	2	6
1997–98	Manchester Storm	ISL	27	7	10	17	8	9	4	2	6	4
1998–99	Manchester Storm	ISL	42	7	12	19	30	7	1	4	5	4
1999–00	Manchester Storm	ISL	42	9	8	17	20	6	0	0	0	4
2000–01	Manchester Storm	ISL	48	4	1	5	22	6	1	2	3	18
2001–02	Manchester Storm	ISL	48	2	3	5	28	8	3	2	5	4
2002–03	Hull Thunder	BNL	22	7	10	17	50	-	-	-	-	-
2002–03	Sheffield Steelers	ISL	10	0	1	1	4	17	1	2	3	6
2003–04	Manchester Phoenix	EIHL	48	9	27	36	68	6	0	1	1	4
