= UIC Flames men's ice hockey =

- University: University of Illinois at Chicago
- Conference: CCHA
- Head coach: N/A
- Arena: UIC Pavilion; Chicago, Illinois
- Colors: Navy blue and fire engine red

Conference tournament champions
- WIHA: 1979

The UIC Flames men's ice hockey was an NCAA Division I ice hockey team that played in the CCHA for most of their 15-year tenure.

== History ==
Illinois–Chicago began sponsoring men's ice hockey in 1966 and stayed with the lesser-classified teams when the NCAA created the tier system in the 1970s. After fifteen years in the second tier the Flames jumped to Division I, playing as an independent for one season before joining the CCHA for the 1982–83 season. With their new coach Val Belmonte the team had difficulty competing in a major conference in the early years, finishing dead last in the CCHA their first two seasons. By 1984–85 the Flames had climbed into the middle of the conference standings aided by top 10 scorer (and future NHLer) Ray Staszak, and their all-time leading defenseman Darin Banister. Two years later the Flames produced their first winning season, going 21–17–1 and winning their first postseason game (though they still couldn't get out of the conference quarterfinals). UIC finally managed to get into the CCHA semifinals in 1989 but after a dreadful season the following year Belmonte was out as coach.

Larry Pedrie was brought in as the next head coach and while the Flames saw a slight improvement in his first season UIC would remain a bottom-feeder for the duration of his tenure. The Flames had a sub-.400 record every season over the next six years and, though they would make the CCHA tournament every year from 1991 through '95, they went 1–10 in tournament play, never making it out of the opening round. When the 1995–96 season rolled around the Flames were seven years removed from a winning season and virtually irrelevant in college hockey circles. More importantly the program had lost the university around $600,000 the year before and UIC did not have another major program to balance out the books. With the administration believing basketball to be a better investment the ice hockey program was discontinued after the season.

UIC Hockey was broadcast from 1983-84 through the final season of 1995-96 with Les Grobstein handing play by play. Chris Madsen and John Kelley filled in when Grobstein had a conflict with UIC Basketball.

The Flames would return to the ice in 2004 as a club team, but as of 2025 the Chicago area and the entire state of Illinois has been left without a Division I program since the Flames program ended.

== Season-by-season records ==
Season	Conference	Record	Pct.	Position	Conference Tournament	Coach
1966–67	NCAA	1–6–0	.143	—	—	John Kantarski
1967–68	NCAA	12–5–0	.706	—	—	John Kantarski
1968–69	NCAA	12–4–0	.750	—	—	John Kantarski
1969–70	NCAA	11–6–0	.647	—	—	John Kantarski
1970–71	NCAA	10–12–1	.457	—	—	John Kantarski
1971–72	NCAA	9–7–0	.563	—	—	John Kantarski
1972–73	NCAA	11–11–0	.500	—	—	John Kantarski
1973–74	NCAA	17–5–2	.750	—	—	John Kantarski
1974–75	NCAA	12–10–0	.545	—	—	John Kantarski
1975–76	NCAA	17–11–1	.603	—	—	John Kantarski
1976–77	NCAA	14–12–0	.538	—	—	John Kantarski
1977–78	NCAA	14–10–0	.583	—	—	John Kantarski
1978–79	NCAA	17–12–1	.583	—	—	John Kantarski
1979–80	NCAA	14–13–0	.519	—	—	John Kantarski
1980–81	NCAA	9–17–0	.346	—	—	John Kantarski
1981–82	Independent	7–24–0	.226	—	—	John Kantarski
1982–83	CCHA	6–28–2	.194	12th	—	Val Belmonte
1983–84	CCHA	5–29–1	.157	11th	—	Val Belmonte
1984–85	CCHA	17–23–0	.425	5th	t-5th	Val Belmonte
1985–86	CCHA	14–25–1	.363	7th	t-5th	Val Belmonte
1986–87	CCHA	21–17–1	.551	4th	t-5th	Val Belmonte
1987–88	CCHA	18–20–1	.474	6th	t-5th	Val Belmonte
1988–89	CCHA	23–14–5	.607	3rd	4th	Val Belmonte
1989–90	CCHA	10–27–1	.276	9th	—	Val Belmonte
1990–91	CCHA	13–23–2	.368	8th	t-5th	Larry Pedrie
1991–92	CCHA	10–20–6	.361	7th	t-5th	Larry Pedrie
1992–93	CCHA	10–25–2	.297	9th	t-7th	Larry Pedrie
1993–94	CCHA	11–26–2	.308	9th	t-7th	Larry Pedrie
1994–95	CCHA	11–22–4	.351	8th	t-6th	Larry Pedrie
1995–96	CCHA	9–24–3	.292	11th	—	Larry Pedrie
30 Seasons	—	365–488–36	.431	—	—	3 Coaches

== All-time coaching records ==
Tenure	Coach	Years	Record	Pct.
1966–1982	John Kantarski	16	187–165–5	.531
1982–1990	Val Belmonte	8	114–183–12	.388
1990–1996	Larry Pedrie	6	64–140–19	.330
Totals	3 coaches	30 seasons	365–488–36	.431

== Flames in the NHL ==
Player	Position	Team(s)	Years	Games	Stanley Cups
Wade Campbell	Defenseman	WPG, BOS	1982–1988	213	0
Shawn Cronin	Defenseman	WSH, WPG, PHI, SJS	1988–1995	292	0
Mike Rucinski	Center	CHI	1987–1989	1	0
Ray Staszak	Forward	DET	1985–1986	4	0
