= List of CCHA men's ice hockey tournament champions =

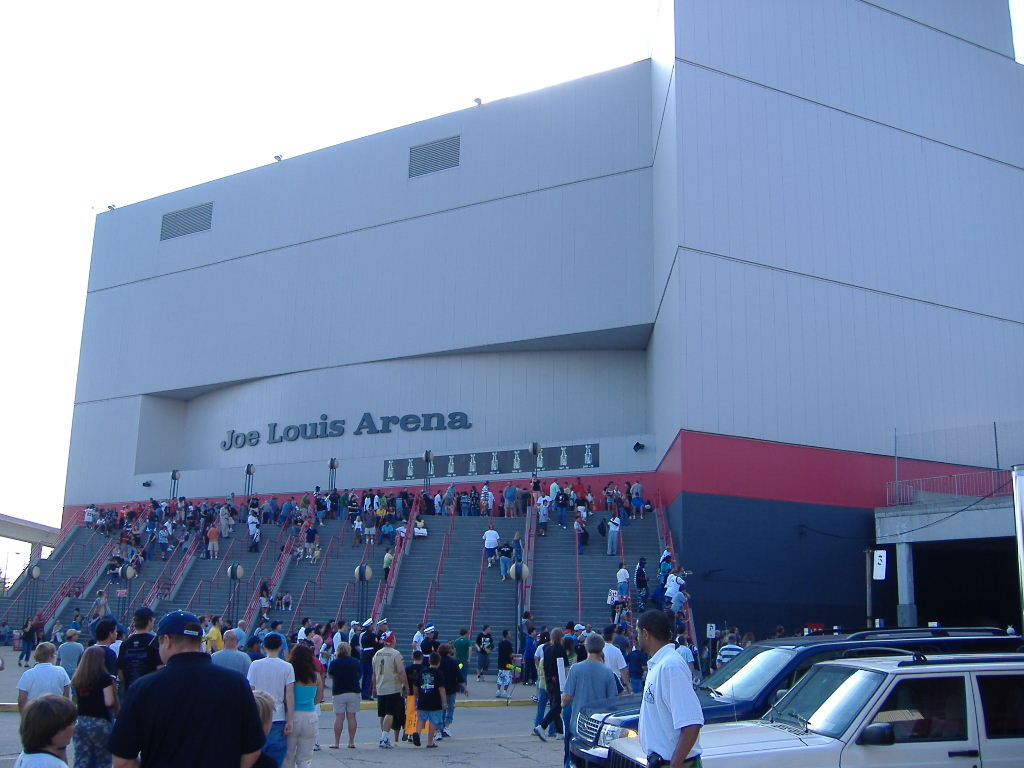
Joe Louis Arena hosted the CCHA Men's Ice Hockey Tournament from 1982 until the demise of the original CCHA in 2013.

The Central Collegiate Hockey Association (CCHA) is a National Collegiate Athletic Association (NCAA) Division I ice hockey-only conference that has operated during two separate periods. The conference was founded in 1971 and disbanded in 2013 following major conference realignment, with then-member Bowling Green taking ownership of the conference name. In 2021, the CCHA was reestablished with eight members, including Bowling Green. At the completion of each regular season, both versions of the CCHA have held the CCHA Men's Ice Hockey Tournament to determine the conference champion. The tournament champions receive the Mason Cup.

The tournament has had a variety of formats.

The tournament was first hosted at the St. Louis Arena in St. Louis, Missouri with Ohio State winning the inaugural tournament. Michigan State won the most CCHA Men's Ice Hockey Tournaments with eleven while Michigan appeared in the most championship game appearances with seventeen. Ron Mason has coached thirteen championship teams, more than any other CCHA coach, and also has the most championship game appearances as coach with seventeen. The Joe Louis Arena in Detroit, Michigan hosted the tournament from 1982 to 2013. The St. Louis Arena hosted the tournament six times, while the BGSU Ice Arena in Bowling Green, Ohio and Lakeview Arena in Marquette, Michigan each hosted the championship game twice.

In the final championship tournament of the original CCHA in 2013, Notre Dame defeated Michigan.

In February 2020, seven schools that had announced their departures from the Western Collegiate Hockey Association, effective after the 2020–21 season, announced they would start play in a new CCHA in 2021–22. Four of these schools had played in the final season of the original CCHA, and a fifth had briefly been a member.

The CCHA tournament resumed in 2022 with a new format in which all games are played at campus sites. Specifically, the first round consists of best-of-three series, with all games hosted by the higher seed in each matchup; the semifinals are single games hosted by the top two surviving seeds; and the final is also a single game hosted by the highest remaining seed.

== Champions ==
Year	Winning team	Coach	Losing team	Coach	Score	Location (Note: Starting in 2022, refers only to championship game site.)	Venue	Reference
1972	Ohio State	Dave Chambers	Saint Louis	Bill Selman	3–0	St. Louis, Missouri	St. Louis Arena	
1973	Bowling Green	Jack Vivian	—	—	—	St. Louis, Missouri	St. Louis Arena	
1974	Saint Louis	Bill Selman	Lake Superior State	Rick Comley	8–3	St. Louis, Missouri	St. Louis Arena	
1975	Saint Louis	Bill Selman	Lake Superior State	Rick Comley	8–3	St. Louis, Missouri	St. Louis Arena	
1976	Saint Louis	Bill Selman	Western Michigan	Bill Neal	15–4 (agg.)	St. Louis, Missouri	St. Louis Arena	
1977	Bowling Green	Ron Mason	Saint Louis	Bill Selman	5–4 (agg.)	St. Louis, Missouri	St. Louis Arena	
1978	Bowling Green	Ron Mason	Saint Louis	Bill Selman	13–3 (agg.)	Bowling Green, Ohio	BGSU Ice Arena	
1979	Bowling Green	Ron Mason	Ohio State	Jerry Welsh	11–7 (agg.)	Bowling Green, Ohio	BGSU Ice Arena	
1980	Northern Michigan	Rick Comley	Ferris State	Rick Duffett	15–9 (agg.)	Marquette, Michigan	Lakeview Arena	
1981	Northern Michigan	Rick Comley	Ohio State	Jerry Welsh	6–4 (agg.)	Marquette, Michigan	Lakeview Arena	
1982	Michigan State	Ron Mason	Notre Dame	Lefty Smith	4–1	Detroit, Michigan	Joe Louis Arena	
1983	Michigan State	Ron Mason	Bowling Green	Jerry York	4–3 (OT)	Detroit, Michigan	Joe Louis Arena	
1984	Michigan State	Ron Mason	Western Michigan	Bill Wilkinson	5–0	Detroit, Michigan	Joe Louis Arena	
1985	Michigan State	Ron Mason	Lake Superior State	Frank Anzalone	5–1	Detroit, Michigan	Joe Louis Arena	
1986	Western Michigan	Bill Wilkinson	Michigan State	Ron Mason	3–1	Detroit, Michigan	Joe Louis Arena	
1987	Michigan State	Ron Mason	Bowling Green	Jerry York	4–3 (OT)	Detroit, Michigan	Joe Louis Arena	
1988	Bowling Green	Jerry York	Lake Superior State	Frank Anzalone	5–3	Detroit, Michigan	Joe Louis Arena	
1989	Michigan State	Ron Mason	Lake Superior State	Frank Anzalone	4–1	Detroit, Michigan	Joe Louis Arena	
1990	Michigan State	Ron Mason	Lake Superior State	Frank Anzalone	4–3	Detroit, Michigan	Joe Louis Arena	
1991	Lake Superior State	Jeff Jackson	Michigan	Red Berenson	6–5 (OT)	Detroit, Michigan	Joe Louis Arena	
1992	Lake Superior State	Jeff Jackson	Michigan	Red Berenson	3–1	Detroit, Michigan	Joe Louis Arena	
1993	Lake Superior State	Jeff Jackson	Miami	George Gwozdecky	3–0	Detroit, Michigan	Joe Louis Arena	
1994	Michigan	Red Berenson	Lake Superior State	Jeff Jackson	3–0	Detroit, Michigan	Joe Louis Arena	
1995	Lake Superior State	Jeff Jackson	Michigan State	Ron Mason	5–3	Detroit, Michigan	Joe Louis Arena	
1996	Michigan	Red Berenson	Lake Superior State	Jeff Jackson	4–3	Detroit, Michigan	Joe Louis Arena	
1997	Michigan	Red Berenson	Michigan State	Ron Mason	3–1	Detroit, Michigan	Joe Louis Arena	
1998	Michigan State	Ron Mason	Ohio State	John Markell	3–2 (2OT)	Detroit, Michigan	Joe Louis Arena	
1999	Michigan	Red Berenson	Northern Michigan	Rick Comley	5–1	Detroit, Michigan	Joe Louis Arena	
2000	Michigan State	Ron Mason	Nebraska-Omaha	Mike Kemp	6–0	Detroit, Michigan	Joe Louis Arena	
2001	Michigan State	Ron Mason	Michigan	Red Berenson	2–0	Detroit, Michigan	Joe Louis Arena	
2002	Michigan	Red Berenson	Michigan State	Ron Mason	3–2	Detroit, Michigan	Joe Louis Arena	
2003	Michigan	Red Berenson	Ferris State	Bob Daniels	5–3	Detroit, Michigan	Joe Louis Arena	
2004	Ohio State	John Markell	Michigan	Red Berenson	4–2	Detroit, Michigan	Joe Louis Arena	
2005	Michigan	Red Berenson	Ohio State	John Markell	4–2	Detroit, Michigan	Joe Louis Arena	
2006	Michigan State	Rick Comley	Miami	Enrico Blasi	2–1	Detroit, Michigan	Joe Louis Arena	
2007	Notre Dame	Jeff Jackson	Michigan	Red Berenson	2–1	Detroit, Michigan	Joe Louis Arena	
2008	Michigan	Red Berenson	Miami	Enrico Blasi	2–1	Detroit, Michigan	Joe Louis Arena	
2009	Notre Dame	Jeff Jackson	Michigan	Red Berenson	5–2	Detroit, Michigan	Joe Louis Arena	
2010	Michigan	Red Berenson	Northern Michigan	Walt Kyle	2–1	Detroit, Michigan	Joe Louis Arena	
2011	Miami	Enrico Blasi	Western Michigan	Jeff Blashill	5–2	Detroit, Michigan	Joe Louis Arena	
2012	Western Michigan	Andy Murray	Michigan	Red Berenson	3–2	Detroit, Michigan	Joe Louis Arena	
2013	Notre Dame	Jeff Jackson	Michigan	Red Berenson	3–1	Detroit, Michigan	Joe Louis Arena	
2022	Minnesota State	Mike Hastings	Bemidji State	Tom Serratore	2–1 (OT)	Mankato, Minnesota	Mayo Clinic Health System Event Center	
2023	Minnesota State	Mike Hastings	Northern Michigan	Grant Potulny	3–2 (OT)	Mankato, Minnesota	Mayo Clinic Health System Event Center	
2024	Michigan Tech	Joe Shawhan	Bemidji State	Tom Serratore	2–1	Bemidji, Minnesota	Sanford Center	
2025	Minnesota State	Luke Strand	St. Thomas	Enrico Blasi	4–2	Mankato, Minnesota	Mayo Clinic Health System Event Center	
