= List of Minnesota Duluth Bulldogs men's ice hockey seasons =

This is a season-by-season list of records compiled by the University of Minnesota Duluth Bulldogs men's ice hockey team.

Minnesota Duluth has won three NCAA Championship in its history, the most recent coming in 2019 (as of 2019).

== Season-by-season results ==
Note: GP = Games played, W = Wins, L = Losses, T = Ties

NCAA D-I Champions	NCAA Frozen Four	Conference regular season champions	Conference Playoff Champions

Season	Conference	Regular Season (Note: Code explanation; GP—Games Played, W—Wins, L—Losses, T—Tied games, OTW—Overtime Wins, OTL—Overtime Loses, 3/SW—Win in 3 on 3 overtime or shootout, Pts—Points*)														Conference Tournament Results	National Tournament Results
Season	Conference	Conference									Overall					Conference Tournament Results	National Tournament Results
Season	Conference	GP	W	L	T	OTW	OTL	3/SW	Pts*	Finish	GP	W	L	T	%	Conference Tournament Results	National Tournament Results
Frank Kovach (1930 — 1932)
1930–31	Independent	–	–	–	–	–	–	–	–	–	3	0	3	0	.000		
1931–32	HLSL	–	–	–	–	–	–	–	–	T–2nd	7	2	5	0	.286		
Program Suspended
Joe Oven (1946 — 1947)
1946–47	SHL	13	10	3	0	–	–	–	.769	3rd	18	11	6	1	.639		
Hank Jensen (1947 — 1951)
1947–48	Independent	–	–	–	–	–	–	–	–	–	9	6	3	0	.667		
1948–49	Independent	–	–	–	–	–	–	–	–	–	7	7	0	0	1.000		
1949–50	MIAC	8	4	3	1	–	–	–	.563	N/A	8	4	3	1	.563		
1950–51	MIAC	5	2	3	0	–	–	–	.400	N/A	5	2	3	0	.400		
Gord Eddolls (1951 — 1954)
1951–52	MIAC	6	0	6	0	–	–	–	.000	N/A	9	2	7	0	.222		
1952–53	MIAC	7	6	1	0	–	–	–	.857	1st	12	9	3	0	.750		
1953–54	MIAC	10	9	1	0	–	–	–	.900	1st	17	10	7	0	.588		
Bob Boyat (1954 — 1955)
1954–55	MIAC	9	7	2	0	–	–	–	.778	2nd	17	9	8	0	.529		
Connie Pleban (1955 — 1959)
1955–56	MIAC	12	12	0	0	–	–	–	1.000	1st	23	17	6	0	.739		
1956–57	MIAC	12	12	0	0	–	–	–	1.000	1st	23	16	4	3	.761		
1957–58	MIAC	10	10	0	0	–	–	–	1.000	1st	20	13	6	1	.675		
1958–59	MIAC	7	7	0	0	–	–	–	1.000	1st	20	10	9	1	.525		
Ralph Romano (1959 — 1968)
1959–60	MIAC	8	8	0	0	–	–	–	1.000	1st	20	15	5	0	.750		
1960–61	MIAC	5	5	0	0	–	–	–	1.000	1st	16	13	3	0	.813		
1961–62	Independent	–	–	–	–	–	–	–	–	–	22	6	14	2	.318		
1962–63	Independent	–	–	–	–	–	–	–	–	–	24	7	15	2	.333		
1963–64	Independent	–	–	–	–	–	–	–	–	–	25	11	14	0	.440		
University Division
1964–65	Independent	–	–	–	–	–	–	–	–	–	27	14	12	1	.537		
1965–66	WCHA	20	3	15	2	–	–	–	.200	8th	28	7	19	2	.286	Lost First round, 3–9 (Michigan Tech)	
1966–67	WCHA	23	8	15	0	–	–	–	.348	6th	28	12	16	0	.429	Lost First round, 4–6 (Michigan Tech)	
1967–68	WCHA	24	4	20	0	–	–	–	.167	8th	28	5	23	0	.179	Lost First round, 4–11 (Denver)	
Bill Selman (1968 — 1970)
1968–69	WCHA	22	3	19	0	–	–	–	.136	8th	29	6	23	0	.207	Lost First round, 1–4 (Denver)	
1969–70	WCHA	24	10	13	1	–	–	–	.438	8th	29	13	15	1	.466	Lost First round, 2–3 (OT) (Minnesota)	
Terry Shercliffe (1970 — 1975)
1970–71	WCHA	24	10	14	0	–	–	–	.417	6th	34	16	17	1	.485	Won West regional semifinal, 4–3 (Michigan State); Lost West Regional Final, 3–9 (Denver)	
1971–72	WCHA	28	15	13	0	–	–	–	40	5th	35	16	18	1	.471	Lost First round series, 4–8 (Michigan State)	
1972–73	WCHA	28	13	15	0	–	–	–	30	8th	36	19	17	0	.528	Lost First round series, 6–9 (Denver)	
Division I
1973–74	WCHA	28	13	14	1	–	–	–	27	6th	38	21	16	1	.566	Lost First round series, 4–8 (Denver)	
1974–75	WCHA	32	9	20	3	–	–	–	21	8th	38	10	24	4	.316	Lost First round series, 2–10 (Minnesota)	
Gus Hendrickson (1975 — 1982)
1975–76	WCHA	32	12	20	0	–	–	–	24	T–7th	36	15	21	0	.417		
1976–77	WCHA	32	6	24	3	–	–	–	14	10th	37	9	26	2	.270		
1977–78	WCHA	32	12	19	1	–	–	–	25	T–7th	37	14	22	1	.392	Lost First round series, 6–14 (Wisconsin)	
1978–79	WCHA	32	18	10	4	–	–	–	40	T–3rd	40	22	14	4	.600	Won First round series, 7–6 (Denver); Lost Second round series, 4–8 (Minnesota)	
1979–80	WCHA	32	15	17	0	–	–	–	.469	6th	38	17	21	0	.447	Lost First round series, 9–11 (Colorado College)	
1980–81	WCHA	28	11	17	0	–	–	–	22	8th	39	17	21	1	.449	Lost First round series, 8–10 (Minnesota)	
1981–82	WCHA	26	9	16	1	–	–	–	19	5th	40	16	21	3	.438	Lost First round series, 7–10 (Denver)	
Mike Sertich (1982 — 2000)
1982–83	WCHA	26	14	12	0	–	–	–	28	4th	45	28	16	1	.633	Won First round series, 13–4 (Denver); Lost Semifinal series, 6–11 (Minnesota)	Lost Quarterfinal series, 5–10 (Providence)
1983–84	WCHA	26	19	5	2	–	–	–	40	1st	43	29	12	2	.698	Won Semifinal series, 15–3 (Wisconsin); Won Championship series, 12–6 (North Dakota)	Won Quarterfinal series, 9–8 (Clarkson); Won Semifinal, 2–1 (North Dakota); Lost Championship, 4–5 (4OT) (Bowling Green)
1984–85	WCHA	34	25	7	2	–	–	–	52	1st	48	36	9	3	.781	Won First round series, 8–4 (Michigan Tech); Won Semifinal series, 10–8 (North Dakota); Won Championship series, 10–8 (Minnesota)	Won Quarterfinal series, 8–4 (Harvard); Lost Semifinal, 5–6 (3OT) (Rensselaer); Won Third-place game, 6–7 (OT) (Boston College)
1985–86	WCHA	34	21	12	1	–	–	–	43	4th	42	26	13	3	.655	Won First round series, 12–8 (Northern Michigan); Lost Semifinal series, 13–7 (Denver)	
1986–87	WCHA	35	11	23	1	–	–	–	23	T–7th	39	11	27	1	.295	Lost First round series, 4–13 (North Dakota)	
1987–88	WCHA	35	15	18	2	–	–	–	32	T–6th	41	18	21	2	.463	Won First round series, 2–0 (Denver); Lost Semifinal, 1–6 (Minnesota); Lost Third-place game, 0–6 (North Dakota)	
1988–89	WCHA	35	12	21	2	–	–	–	26	7th	40	15	23	2	.400	Lost First round series, 0–2 (Northern Michigan)	
1989–90	WCHA	28	13	15	0	–	–	–	26	6th	40	20	19	1	.513	Lost First round series, 0–2 (North Dakota)	
1990–91	WCHA	32	11	15	6	–	–	–	28	T–5th	40	14	19	7	.438	Lost First round series, 0–2 (Wisconsin)	
1991–92	WCHA	32	14	16	2	–	–	–	30	5th	37	15	20	2	.432	Lost First round series, 1–2 (Colorado College)	
1992–93	WCHA	32	21	9	2	–	–	–	44	1st	40	27	11	2	.700	Won First round series, 2–0 (Alaska–Anchorage); Lost Semifinal, 2–6 (Northern Michigan); Won Third-place game, 7–5 (Wisconsin)	Won Regional Quarterfinal, 7–3 (Brown); Lost regional semifinal, 3–4 (Lake Superior State)
1993–94	WCHA	32	12	17	3	–	–	–	27	7th	38	14	21	3	.408	Lost First round series, 0–2 (St. Cloud State)	
1994–95	WCHA	32	13	15	4	–	–	–	30	7th	38	16	18	4	.474	Lost First round series, 0–2 (Minnesota)	
1995–96	WCHA	32	16	15	1	–	–	–	33	T–4th	38	20	17	1	.539	Lost First round series, 0–2 (Michigan Tech)	
1996–97	WCHA	32	15	13	4	–	–	–	34	6th	38	18	16	4	.526	Lost First round series, 0–2 (Denver)	
1997–98	WCHA	28	14	12	2	–	–	–	30	5th	40	21	17	2	.550	Won First round series, 2–1 (Minnesota); Lost Quarterfinal, 3–4 (St. Cloud State)	
1998–99	WCHA	28	4	20	4	–	–	–	12	9th	38	7	27	4	.237	Lost First round series, 0–2 (Colorado College)	
1999–00	WCHA	28	10	18	0	–	–	–	20	8th	37	15	22	0	.405	Lost First round series, 1–2 (St. Cloud State)	
Scott Sandelin (2000 — Present)
2000–01	WCHA	28	3	22	3	–	–	–	9	10th	39	7	28	4	.231	Lost First round series, 1–2 (North Dakota)	
2001–02	WCHA	28	6	19	3	–	–	–	15	9th	40	13	24	3	.363	Lost First round series, 0–2 (St. Cloud State)	
2002–03	WCHA	28	14	10	4	–	–	–	32	5th	42	22	15	5	.583	Won First round series, 2–1 (St. Cloud State); Won Quarterfinal, 2–6 (North Dakota); Lost Semifinal, 3–4 (OT) (Colorado College); Won Third-place game, 6–4 (Minnesota State)	
2003–04	WCHA	28	19	7	2	–	–	–	40	2nd	45	28	13	4	.667	Won First round series, 2–1 (Minnesota State); Lost Semifinal, 4–7 (Minnesota); Won Third-place game, 4–2 (Alaska–Anchorage)	Won Regional semifinal, 5–0 (Michigan State); Won Regional Final, 3–1 (Minnesota); Lost National semifinal, 3–5 (Denver)
2004–05	WCHA	28	11	13	4	–	–	–	26	6th	38	15	17	6	.474	Lost First round series, 0–2 (North Dakota)	
2005–06	WCHA	28	6	19	3	–	–	–	15	9th	40	11	25	4	.325	Won First round series, 2–1 (Denver); Lost Quarterfinal, 1–5 (St. Cloud State)	
2006–07	WCHA	28	8	16	4	–	–	–	20	9th	39	13	21	5	.397	Lost First round series, 1–2 (St. Cloud State)	
2007–08	WCHA	28	9	14	5	–	–	–	23	8th	36	13	17	6	.444	Lost First round series, 0–2 (Denver)	
2008–09	WCHA	28	10	11	7	–	–	–	27	7th	43	22	13	8	.250	Won First round series, 2–0 (Colorado College); Won Quarterfinal, 2–1 (Minnesota); Won Semifinal, 3–0 (North Dakota); Won Championship, 4–0 (Denver)	Won Regional semifinal, 5–4 (OT) (Princeton); Lost Regional Final, 1–2 (Miami)
2009–10	WCHA	28	16	11	1	–	–	–	33	T–4th	40	22	17	1	.563	Won First round series, 2–1 (Colorado College); Lost Quarterfinal, 0–2 (North Dakota)	
2010–11	WCHA	28	15	8	5	–	–	–	35	4th	42	26	10	6	.690	Won First round series, 2–0 (St. Cloud State); Lost Quarterfinal, 2–3 (OT) (Bemidji State)	Won Regional semifinal, 2–0 (Union); Won Regional Final, 5–3 (Yale); Won National semifinal, 4–3 (Notre Dame); Won National Championship, 3–2 (OT) (Michigan)
2011–12	WCHA	28	16	7	5	–	–	–	37	2nd	41	25	10	6	.683	Won First round series, 2–0 (Minnesota State); Lost Semifinal, 3–4 (2OT) (Denver)	Won Regional semifinal, 5–2 (Maine); Lost Regional Final, 0–4 (Boston College)
2012–13	WCHA	28	10	13	5	–	–	–	25	9th	38	14	19	5	.434	Lost First round series, 0–2 (Wisconsin)	
2013–14	NCHC	24	11	11	2	–	–	2	37	T–4th	36	16	16	4	.500	Lost Quarterfinal series, 0–2 (Western Michigan)	
2014–15	NCHC	24	12	9	3	–	–	0	39	5th	40	21	16	3	.563	Lost Quarterfinal series, 0–2 (Denver)	Won Regional semifinal, 4–1 (Minnesota); Lost Regional Final, 2–3 (Boston University)
2015–16	NCHC	24	11	10	3	–	–	1	37	4th	40	19	16	5	.538	Won Quarterfinal series, 2–0 (Miami); Won Semifinal, 4–2 (North Dakota); Lost Championship, 1–3 (St. Cloud State)	Won Regional semifinal, 2–1 (Providence); Lost Regional Final, 2–3 (Boston College)
2016–17	NCHC	24	15	5	4	–	–	3	52	2nd	42	28	7	7	.750	Won First round series, 2–0 (Miami); Won Semifinal, 5–2 (Western Michigan); Won Championship, 4–3 (North Dakota)	Won Regional semifinal, 3–2 (OT) (Ohio State); Won Regional Final, 3–2 (OT) (Boston University); Won National semifinal, 2–1 (Harvard); Lost National Championship, 2–3 (Denver)
2017–18	NCHC	24	13	11	0	–	–	0	39	3rd	44	25	16	3	.602	Won First round series, 2–0 (Western Michigan); Lost Semifinal, 1–3 (Denver); Lost Third-place game, 1–4 (North Dakota)	Won Regional semifinal, 3–2 (Minnesota State); Won Regional Final, 2–1 (Air Force); Won National semifinal, 2–1 (Ohio State); Won National Championship, 2–1 (Notre Dame)
2018–19	NCHC	24	14	9	1	–	–	0	43	2nd	42	29	11	2	.714	Won First round series, 2–0 (Omaha); Won Semifinal, 3–0 (Denver); Won Championship, 3–2 (2OT) (St. Cloud State)	Won Regional semifinal, 2–1 (OT) (Bowling Green); Won Regional Final, 3–1 (Quinnipiac); Won National semifinal, 4–1 (Providence); Won National Championship, 3–0 (Massachusetts)
2019–20	NCHC	24	17	5	2	–	–	0	53	2nd	34	22	10	2	.676	Tournament Cancelled	
2020–21	NCHC	24	13	9	2	1	2	1	.597	3rd	28	15	11	2	.571	Won Quarterfinal, 5–4 (OT) (Western Michigan); Lost Semifinal, 2–3 (St. Cloud State)	Regional semifinal, No Contest (Michigan); Won Regional Final, 3–2 (5OT) (North Dakota); Lost National semifinal, 2–3 (OT) (Massachusetts)
2021–22	NCHC	24	10	10	4	1	1	2	36	T–4th	42	22	16	4	.571	Won Quarterfinal series, 2–0 (St. Cloud State); Won Semifinal, 2–0 (Denver); Won Championship, 3–0 (Western Michigan)	Won Regional semifinal, 3–0 (Michigan Tech); Lost Regional Final, 1–2 (Denver)
2022–23	NCHC	24	10	14	0	0	1	4	33	T–5th	37	16	20	1	.446	Lost Quarterfinal series, 1–2 (St. Cloud State)	
2023–24	NCHC	24	8	14	2	3	3	2	28	7th	37	12	20	5	.392	Lost Quarterfinal series, 0–2 (Denver)	
2024–25	NCHC	24	9	13	2	2	2	1	30	7th	36	13	20	3	.403	Lost Quarterfinal series, 0–2 (Arizona State)	
2025-26	NCHC	24	11	12	1	3	4	1	36	4th	40	24	15	1	.613	Won Quarterfinal Series, 2-0 VS St. Cloud State Won Semifinal, 5-1 VS North Dakota Lost Final, 3-4(2OT) VS Denver	Won Regional semifinal VS Penn State, 3-1 Lost Regional final VS Michigan, 3-4
Totals											GP	W	L	T	%	Championships	
Regular Season											2439	1165	1115	177	.510	8 MIAC Championships, 3 WCHA Championships	
Conference Post-season											159	67	89	5	.432	3 WCHA tournament championships, 3 NCHC tournament championships	
NCAA Post-season											45	30	15	0	.667	15 NCAA Tournament appearances	
Regular Season and Post-season Record											2655	1262	1221	182	.508	3 NCAA Division I National Championships	

* Winning percentage is used when conference schedules are unbalanced.
