= Bill Selman =

Canadian ice hockey coach (born c.1939)

Biographical details
- Born: c. 1939; Fort Frances, Ontario, Canada
- Education: North Dakota

Playing career
- 1960–1963: North Dakota
- Position: Defenceman

Coaching career (HC unless noted)
- 1964–1966: North Dakota (assistant)
- 1966–1968: North Dakota
- 1968–1970: Minnesota–Duluth
- 1970–1979: St. Louis
- 1979–1980: Dayton Gems
- 1981–1983: Lake Superior State
- 1982: US National Team

Head coaching record
- Overall: 277-217-21 (.558)

Accomplishments and honors

Championships
- 1963 National Champion (player); 1967 WCHA Champion; 1967 WCHA Tournament champion 1968 WCHA tournament champion 1973 CCHA Champion; 1974 CCHA Tournament champion 1975 CCHA Champion; 1975 CCHA tournament champion 1976 CCHA tournament champion 1977 CCHA Champion

Awards
- 1967 WCHA Coach of the Year; 1977 CCHA Coach of the Year; 2014 St. Louis Sport Hall of Fame President's Choice Award; 2016 Hobey Baker Legends of College Hockey Award

William G. Selman (born c. 1939) is a Canadian retired head coach of men's college, university and professional ice hockey teams.

== Career ==
Bill Selman was a three-year letterman for the North Dakota Fighting Sioux, winning a national title with the team in his senior season. After two seasons as an assistant in Grand Forks Selman became the third consecutive assistant coach to be promoted to head coach of the Sioux in 1966. Selman led North Dakota to two conference tournament titles in each of his first two seasons, finishing as runners up in 1968. After only two years Selman left his alma mater to take over at Minnesota–Duluth. Two seasons later Selman once again changed universities, this time leading the new Division I program at Saint Louis.

The Billikens would only remain in the upper echelon for nine years but Selman stayed with the team for the entire time being a driving force behind the formation of the CCHA, capturing three conference titles, three conference tournament championships and coaching three future NHL players (Mike Krushelnyski, Mario Faubert and Lindsay Middlebrook). Once Saint Louis ended their program Selman moved on to be the head coach of the IHL's Dayton Gems for the 1979–80 season. After a year off Selman was back in the college ranks, this time with the Lake Superior State Lakers. He coached Team USA at the 1982 World Ice Hockey Championships but finished with a disastrous 0-6-1 record that saw the US relegated out of the top bracket. Selman would only coach Lake Superior State for 20 games the following season before retiring from coaching and taking a job with Anheuser-Busch in the sports marketing department.

In his career Selman was named as coach of the year for both the WCHA (1967) and CCHA (1977) while also receiving the 2014 President's Choice Award from the St. Louis Sports Hall of Fame and the 2016 Hobey Baker Legends of College Hockey Award.

== Head coaching record ==
=== College ===
Record table
Season	Team	Overall	Conference	Standing	Postseason
North Dakota Fighting Sioux (WCHA) (1966–1968)
1966–67	North Dakota	19-10-0	16-6-0	1st	NCAA consolation game (loss)
1967–68	North Dakota	20-10-3	13-8-1	3rd	NCAA runner-up
North Dakota:		39-20-3	29-14-1		
Minnesota–Duluth Bulldogs (WCHA) (1968–1970)
1968–69	Minnesota–Duluth	6-23-0	3-19-0	8th	WCHA regional semifinals
1969–70	Minnesota–Duluth	13-15-1	10-13-1	8th	WCHA regional semifinals
Minnesota–Duluth:		19-38-1	13-32-1		
Saint Louis Billikens Independent (1970–1971)
1970–71	Saint Louis	9-19-2			
Saint Louis:		9-19-2			
Saint Louis Billikens (CCHA) (1971–1979)
1971–72	Saint Louis	15-15-3	7-3-2	2nd	CCHA runner-up
1972–73	Saint Louis	27-11-0	13-3-0	1st	CCHA runner-up
1973–74	Saint Louis	28-12-0	5-3-0	2nd	CCHA Champion
1974–75	Saint Louis	26-13-1	5-3-0	1st	CCHA Champion
1975–76	Saint Louis	24-15-2	10-5-1	2nd	CCHA Champion
1976–77	Saint Louis	27-11-1	13-2-1	1st	CCHA runner-up
1977–78	Saint Louis	21-17-2	10-10-0	2nd	CCHA runner-up
1978–79	Saint Louis	16-16-3	9-13-2	5th	
Saint Louis:		184-110-12	72-42-6		
Lake Superior State Lakers (CCHA) (1981–1982)
1981–82	Lake Superior State	19-17-3	11-15-2	5th	CCHA Quarterfinals
1982–83	Lake Superior State	7-13-0†	5-11-0†		
Lake Superior State:		26-30-3	16-26-2		
Total:		277-217-21			
National champion Postseason invitational champion Conference regular season champion Conference regular season and conference tournament champion Division regular season champion Division regular season and conference tournament champion Conference tournament champion

† Selman resigned in December 1982

Awards and achievements
Preceded by John MacInnes	WCHA Coach of the Year; 1966–67	Succeeded by Murray Armstrong
Preceded by Ron Mason	CCHA Coach of the Year; 1976–77	Succeeded by Ron Mason
Preceded by Tim Taylor	Hobey Baker Legends of College Hockey Award; 2016	Succeeded by Bill Riley Jr.
Sporting positions
Preceded by Bob Peters	Head coach of the University of North Dakota; 1966–1968	Succeeded by Rube Bjorkman
Preceded by Ralph Romano	Head coach of the University of Minnesota Duluth; 1968–1970	Succeeded by Terry Shercliffe
Preceded by Program established	Head coach of St. Louis University; 1970–1979	Succeeded by Program returned to club status
Preceded by Larry Mickey	Head coach of the Dayton Gems (IHL); 1979–1980	Succeeded by Team folded
Preceded by Rick Yeo	Head coach of Lake Superior State University; 1981–1982	Succeeded by Frank Anzalone
