= Ron Mason =

Canadian ice hockey player and coach

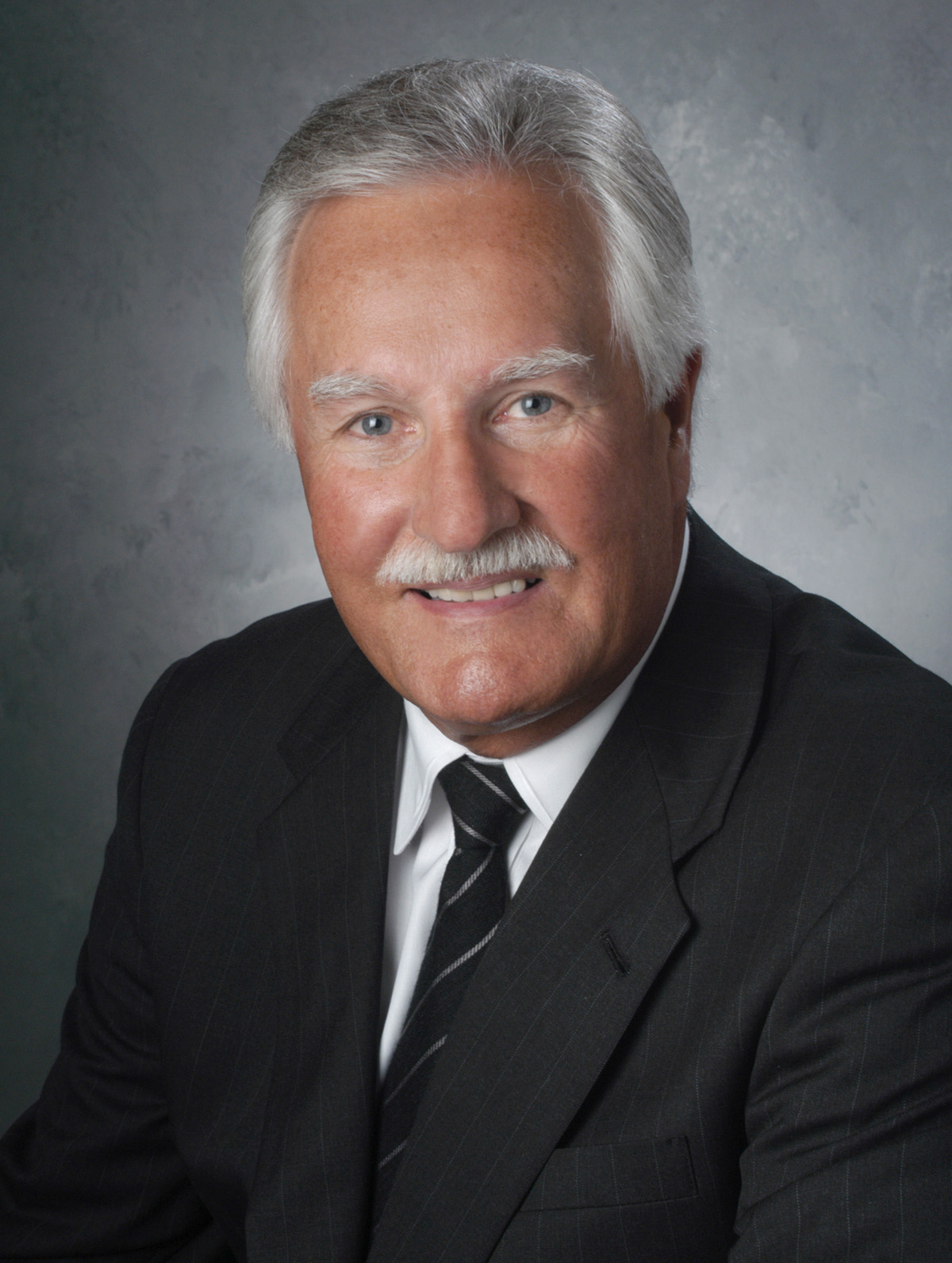

Biographical details
- Born: January 14, 1940; Seaforth, Ontario, Canada
- Died: June 13, 2016 (aged 76); Haslett, Michigan, U.S.

Playing career
- 1960–1963: St. Lawrence

Coaching career (HC unless noted)
- 1967–1973: Lake Superior State
- 1973–1979: Bowling Green
- 1979–2002: Michigan State

Administrative career (AD unless noted)
- 2002–2007: Michigan State

Head coaching record
- Overall: 924–380–83

Accomplishments and honors

Championships
- NAIA champion (1972); NCAA champion (1986); 7× Frozen Four (1984, 1986, 1987, 1989, 1992, 1999, 2001); 7× CCHA Regular Season Championships ( 1985, 1986, 1989, 1990, 1998, 1999, 2001); 10× CCHA Tournament Championships ( 1982, 1983, 1984, 1985, 1987, 1989, 1990, 1998, 2000, 2001)

Ronald Herbert Mason (January 14, 1940 – June 13, 2016) was a Canadian ice hockey player, head coach, and university executive. A head coach of various American universities, most notably Michigan State University (MSU), he was the most successful coach in NCAA ice hockey history between 1993 and 2012 with 924 wins, until Jerry York (Boston College) became the new winningest coach with his 925th career win on December 29, 2012. Mason was athletic director at MSU from 2002 to 2008. He then served as senior advisor for the USHL Muskegon Lumberjacks. On December 2, 2013, Mason was inducted into the United States Hockey Hall of Fame.

== Family ==
Ron Mason was born the son of Harvey Mason, a salesman, and Agnes Mackay Mason, an elementary school teacher. He married the former Marion Bell on June 8, 1963. They had two daughters, Tracey (born 1963) and Cindy (born 1968) and two grandsons, Tyler and Travis. Travis was a defenseman on the Michigan State University hockey team until his graduation in 2016. Mason had one sister, Marion Mason Rowe.

== Education ==
Mason earned a B.A. in physical education from St. Lawrence University in 1964 and a Masters in physical education from the University of Pittsburgh in 1965. Michigan State University awarded Mason an honorary doctorate in 2001.

== Career as player ==
Mason played junior hockey with the Ontario Hockey Association’s Peterborough Petes and the Ottawa Junior Canadians. From there Mason enrolled at St. Lawrence University in the upstate town of Canton, New York where he lettered in hockey for three years. In his first season at SLU in 1960–61, Mason and the Skating Saints were NCAA national finalists. In 1961–62, Mason and SLU won the school's first Eastern College Athletic Conference championship and made the NCAA Frozen Four. In his final season, SLU won a school-record 20 games finishing 20–6–1. Mason led the team in scoring twice earning back-to-back first-team all-league honors. Mason was St. Lawrence's only player to earn that distinction until T. J. Trevelyan was named all-league in 2005 and 2006.

== Career as coach ==
Mason coached one NAIA program, Lake Superior State, and two NCAA programs, Bowling Green State and Michigan State in 36 seasons from 1966 to 2002. He won two national titles: NAIA in 1972 with Lake Superior State and NCAA in 1986 with Michigan State. Ron Mason finished his coaching career as the all-time career victories leader in college hockey history with 924 wins. Boston College's Jerry York surpassed Mason's win total on December 31, 2012. Mason is also the career coaching victories leader at Michigan State with 635 wins. He is Bowling Green State's winningest coach by percentage winning over 71 percent of his 229 games at BGSU.

Mason had 33 seasons with a winning record, 30 seasons winning 20 or more games and 11 seasons winning 30 or more games. Mason won ten CCHA regular season championships and a record 13 CCHA tournament titles. He advanced his teams to the NCAA tournament 22 times—six times as the No. 1 seed—making the Frozen Four eight times. Mason was the CCHA coach of the year six times. He won the Spencer Penrose Memorial Trophy as the national coach of the year in 1992.

On January 26, 2002, a media report stated Mason would step down as coach at Michigan State to take over the athletic director position at MSU. On January 28, 2002, Mason made it official that he would leave his post as head ice hockey coach to become athletic director.

=== Lake Superior State ===
Mason started the hockey program at Lake Superior State University in 1966. In seven seasons at LSSU he produced four 20-win seasons and never lost more than 10 games. He guided the Lakers to the 1972 National Association of Intercollegiate Athletics (NAIA) national championship.

=== Bowling Green State University ===
In 1973 he moved to Bowling Green State University where he won three Central Collegiate Hockey Association regular season titles and three consecutive CCHA tournament titles in six seasons. In 1977 Bowling Green State earned their first berth in the NCAA tournament. The berth was a first for a team not from the Western Collegiate Hockey Association or Eastern Collegiate Athletic Conference in the NCAA tournament's 30-year history. It was the first of three consecutive NCAA tournaments under Mason. BGSU won the third-place game over defending national champion Wisconsin in the 1978 NCAA Frozen Four. In 1978–79 Mason coached BGSU to a then NCAA record 37 wins. The record would be broken in 1984-85 by Mason's own Michigan State team.

=== Michigan State ===
Michigan State University Athletic Director Joseph Kearney hired Mason to replace the retiring Amo Bessone on April 1, 1979. In his third season at MSU, Mason guided Michigan State to their first NCAA tournament in 15 seasons. Four seasons later in 1986, Mason led Michigan State to the school's second national title. Michigan State returned to the championship game the following season but lost to North Dakota. On March 12, 1993, with a 6-5 win over Kent State, Mason passed former Boston College coach Len Ceglarski to become college hockey's all-time winningest coach with 674 wins. While at MSU, Mason won a conference-record 10 CCHA tournament championships, including a conference-record four straight from 1982 to 1985. In addition, MSU won seven CCHA regular season titles under mason, earned 19 NCAA tournament appearances, and earned seven NCAA Frozen Four appearances.

== Career as athletic director ==
Ron Mason began his duties as athletic director on July 1, 2002. Before he officially became athletic director, Mason chose Rick Comley as his successor as hockey coach.

On November 4, 2002, after a disappointing season and a series of off-the-field incidents with players, Mason fired head football coach Bobby Williams with three games left in the season and eventually hired John L. Smith away from Louisville as his permanent replacement. Mason fired Smith after three consecutive losing seasons, and Mason then hired Mark Dantonio away from Cincinnati, who brought the Spartans to football prominence.

While athletic director, the Michigan State hockey team won the school's third national title in 2007. Mason is the only person to have won NCAA ice hockey titles as head coach and athletic director. Mason also placed a priority seat licensing program in Spartan Stadium based on years of holding season tickets, contribution to the Ralph Young Fund, and a licensing fee for better seats on top of the price of season tickets. Further updates to increase revenue in Spartan Stadium included a $64 million USD expansion and improvements which include:

- 24 luxury suites
- 800 club seats
- The "Grand Entrance" featuring high ceilings, glass walls, marble floors and a new home for the original Sparty statue
- 18,000-square-foot (1,700 m^{2}) luxury concourse
- Office space for Career Services, University Advancement and the MSU Alumni Office
- State of the art recruiting lounge
- Upgraded stadium-wide bathroom and concourse renovations
- An increase of 3000 seats, bringing the total stadium capacity to 75,005

In September 2006, Michigan State University's board of trustees approved a contract extension for Mason extending his contract as MSU's athletic director through June 2008. He retired from the post of athletic director at Michigan State University on January 1, 2008, and was succeeded by Mark Hollis.

== Legacy with the CCHA ==
In addition to his success as a coach, Mason was involved in organizing the Central Collegiate Hockey Association (CCHA) and helping it to grow into one of the most powerful college hockey conferences of the 1980s, '90s, and 2000s. When Mason began coaching in 1966 there were only two major conferences in the NCAA, the Eastern College Athletic Conference and the Western Collegiate Hockey Association. While building the ice hockey program at Lake Superior State to Division I status, Mason found that his team was left without a conference. In 1972 Mason, along with Bowling Green State University's Jack Vivian, St. Louis University's Bill Selman, Ohio State University's Dave Chambers, Ohio University's John McComb and the CCHA's first commissioner Fred Jacoby, formed the Central Collegiate Hockey Association. Mason's coaching tenure at Bowling Green State produced the CCHA's first NCAA tournament berth, first appearance in the NCAA Frozen Four, and first national No. 1 ranking.

For his contributions in helping build the CCHA, the conference renamed their tournament championship trophy as the Mason Cup in 2000–01.

== Honors ==
Munn Ice Arena ice rink was named October 7, 2023 for Ron Mason. The dedication of Ron Mason Rink came as the Spartans Beat Lake Superior State 5-2 – another school where Mason's legacy is a part of the fabric of the program's historical success. Mason is one of a handful of coaches to win national championships at two different institutions, as he led LSSU to the NAIA national championship in 1972 and MSU to the NCAA national title in 1986.

== Philanthropy ==
Mason volunteered with the Sparrow Foundation, where he established the Ron Mason Fund for Pediatric Rehabilitation, which helps children with disabilities. The fund has raised $675,000 for the foundation since 1998. He was also the honorary chairperson for the Children's Miracle Network, which has raised $19 million-plus since 1989.

== Death ==
Mason died on the morning of June 13, 2016, in Haslett, Michigan, after suffering a heart attack. He was 76.

== Notable players coached ==
In his 36 years, Mason coached a number of outstanding players.

=== Hobey Baker Award winners ===
Ryan Miller	2001	Goalie	Michigan State	Won award as a sophomore goaltender. Cousin of 1990 winner Kip Miller.
Kip Miller	1990	Forward	Michigan State	Michigan State's first Hobey Baker Award winner.
George McPhee	1982	Forward	Bowling Green State	Mason recruited McPhee to BGSU and coached him for one season.

=== Hobey Baker Award finalists ===
Ron Scott	1982 and 1983
Kelly Miller	1985
Craig Simpson	1985
Mike Donnelly	1986
Bobby Reynolds	1989
Bryan Smolinski	1993
Anson Carter	1995
Chad Alban	1998
Mike York	1998 and 1999
Shawn Horcoff	2000
Ryan Miller	2002

=== AHCA All-America ===
Don Muio	1972	Goalie	Lake Superior State	College Division
Jim Wiley	1972	Forward	Lake Superior State	College Division
Ken Morrow	1978	Defense	Bowling Green State	
Ron Scott	1982	Goalie	Michigan State	
Ron Scott	1983	Goalie	Michigan State	
Dan McFall	1984	Defense	Michigan State	Second Team
Dan McFall	1985	Defense	Michigan State	
Kelly Miller	1985	Forward	Michigan State	
Craig Simpson	1985	Forward	Michigan State	
Gary Haight	1985	Defense	Michigan State	Second Team
Mike Donnelly	1986	Forward	Michigan State	
Don McSween	1986	Defense	Michigan State	Second Team
Mitch Messier	1987	Forward	Michigan State	
Don McSween	1987	Defense	Michigan State	Second Team
Kip Miller	1989	Forward	Michigan State	
Bobby Reynolds	1989	Forward	Michigan State	
Kip Miller	1990	Forward	Michigan State	
Jason Muzzatti	1990	Goalie	Michigan State	Second Team
Jason Woolley	1991	Defense	Michigan State	
Joby Messier	1992	Defense	Michigan State	
Dwayne Norris	1992	Forward	Michigan State	
Bryan Smolinski	1993	Forward	Michigan State	
Steve Guolla	1994	Forward	Michigan State	Second Team
Anson Carter	1995	Forward	Michigan State	Second Team
Chad Alban	1998	Goalie	Michigan State	
Mike York	1998	Forward	Michigan State	
Tyler Harlton	1998	Defense	Michigan State	Second Team
Sean Berens	1998	Forward	Michigan State	Second Team
Joe Blackburn	1999	Goalie	Michigan State	
Mike York	1999	Forward	Michigan State	
Mike Weaver	1999	Defense	Michigan State	Second Team
Shawn Horcoff	2000	Forward	Michigan State	
Mike Weaver	2000	Defense	Michigan State	
Ryan Miller	2001	Goalie	Michigan State	
Ryan Miller	2002	Goalie	Michigan State	
Andrew Hutchinson	2002	Defense	Michigan State	Second Team
John-Michael Liles	2002	Defense	Michigan State	Second Team

=== CCHA Player of the Year ===
Mike Liut	1977	Goalie	Bowling Green State
John Markell	1978	Forward	Bowling Green State
Ken Morrow	1979	Defense	Bowling Green State
Kip Miller	1990	Forward	Michigan State
Dwayne Norris	1992	Forward	Michigan State
Chad Alban	1998	Goalie	Michigan State
Mike York	1999	Forward	Michigan State
Shawn Horcoff	2000	Forward	Michigan State
Ryan Miller	2001	Goalie	Michigan State
Ryan Miller	2002	Goalie	Michigan State

=== NHL first round draft picks ===
Craig Simpson	1985	Pittsburgh Penguins	2nd
Joe Murphy*	1986	Detroit Red Wings	1st
Jason Muzzatti	1988	Calgary Flames	21st
Rod Brind'Amour	1988	St. Louis Blues	9th
Bryan Smolinski	1990	Boston Bruins	21st
Michael Stewart	1990	New York Rangers	13th
Jim Slater	2002	Atlanta Thrashers	30th

Joe Murphy was first NCAA player selected first overall

=== Select NHL players ===
Rod Brind'Amour	Michigan State	21 seasons
Anson Carter	Michigan State	12 seasons
Danton Cole	Michigan State	7 seasons
Jim Cummins	Michigan State	12 seasons
Bob Essensa	Michigan State	12 seasons
Steve Guolla	Michigan State	6 seasons
Adam Hall	Michigan State	10 seasons
Shawn Horcoff	Michigan State	11 seasons
Andrew Hutchinson	Michigan State	6 seasons
Duncan Keith	Michigan State	6 seasons
John-Michael Liles	Michigan State	8 seasons
Mike Liut	Bowling Green State	13 seasons
Chris Luongo	Michigan State	4 seasons
Brian MacLellan	Bowling Green State	10 seasons
George McPhee	Bowling Green State	7 seasons
Kelly Miller	Michigan State	16 seasons
Kevin Miller	Michigan State	12 seasons
Kip Miller	Michigan State	12 seasons
Ryan Miller	Michigan State	18 seasons
Ken Morrow	Bowling Green State	10 seasons
Joe Murphy	Michigan State	15 seasons
Rem Murray	Michigan State	9 seasons
Craig Simpson	Michigan State	10 seasons
Jim Slater	Michigan State	7 seasons
Bryan Smolinski	Michigan State	17 seasons
Mike Watt	Michigan State	5 seasons
Mike Weaver	Michigan State	10 seasons
Peter White	Michigan State	10 seasons
Jim Wiley	Lake Superior State	4 seasons
Neil Wilkinson	Michigan State	10 seasons
Jason Woolley	Michigan State	14 seasons
Mike York	Michigan State	10 seasons

=== Olympians ===
Bob Dobek	1976	USA	
Doug Ross	1976	USA	
Ken Morrow	1980	USA	Gold
Mark Wells	1980	USA	Gold
Gary Haight	1984	USA	
Kevin Miller	1988	USA	
Geir Hoff	1988	Norway	
Brian Stankiewicz	1988	Austria	
Jason Woolley	1992	Canada	Silver
Geir Hoff	1992	Norway	
Dwayne Norris	1994	Canada	Silver
Geir Hoff	1994	Norway	
Brian Stankiewicz	1994	Austria	
Rod Brind'Amour	1998	Canada	
Mike York	2002	USA	Silver
John-Michael Liles	2006	USA	
Jason Muzzatti	2006	Italy	
Tony Tuzzolino	2006	Italy	
Ryan Miller	2010, 2014	USA	Silver ('10)
Duncan Keith	2010, 2014	Canada	Gold ('10, '14)

== Head coaching record ==
Record table
Season	Team	Overall	Conference	Standing	Postseason
Lake Superior State Lakers Independent (1966–1967)
1966–67	Lake Superior State	15–5–0			
Lake Superior State Lakers (ICHA) (1967–1972)
1967–68	Lake Superior State	21–3–2	15–1–0	1st	NAIA Finalist
1968–69	Lake Superior State	21–5–0	12–4–0	2nd	NAIA Finalist
1969–70	Lake Superior State	19–7–0	10–2–0	T-1st	NAIA Finalist
1970–71	Lake Superior State	13–7–4	5–5–2	3rd	
1971–72	Lake Superior State	20–8–2	12–0–0	1st	NAIA Champion
Lake Superior State Lakers (CCHA) (1972–1973)
1972–73	Lake Superior State	21–9–0	9–3–0	2nd	NAIA Third Place
Lake Superior State:		130–44–8	64–15–2		
Bowling Green Falcons (CCHA) (1973–1979)
1973–74	Bowling Green	20–19–0	2–6–0	3rd	CCHA Third-place game (win)
1974–75	Bowling Green	23–10–2	4–3–1	2nd	CCHA Semifinals
1975–76	Bowling Green	21–9–2	11–4–1	1st	CCHA Semifinals
1976–77	Bowling Green	28–11–0	10–6–0	2nd	NCAA Quarterfinal
1977–78	Bowling Green	31–8–0	15–3–0	1st	NCAA consolation game (win)
1978–79	Bowling Green	37–6–2	21–2–1	1st	NCAA Quarterfinal
Bowling Green:		160–63–6	63–24–3		
Michigan State Spartans (WCHA / Big Ten) (1979–1981)
1979–80	Michigan State	14–24–0	12–16–0	8th / 3rd	WCHA Quarterfinals
1980–81	Michigan State	12–22–2	7–20–1	10th / 4th	
Michigan State Spartans (CCHA) (1981–2002)
1981–82	Michigan State	26–14–2	21–10–1	2nd	NCAA Quarterfinals
1982–83	Michigan State	30–11–1	23–9–0	2nd	NCAA Quarterfinals
1983–84	Michigan State	34–12–0	21–9–0	T-2nd	NCAA consolation game (loss)
1984–85	Michigan State	38–6–0	27–5–0	1st	NCAA Quarterfinals
1985–86	Michigan State	34–9–2	23–7–2	1st	NCAA Champion
1986–87	Michigan State	33–10–2	23–8–1	2nd	NCAA runner-up
1987–88	Michigan State	27–16–3	18–11–3	3rd	NCAA Quarterfinals
1988–89	Michigan State	37–9–1	25–6–1	1st	NCAA consolation game (win)
1989–90	Michigan State	35–7–3	26–3–3	1st	NCAA Quarterfinals
1990–91	Michigan State	17–18–5	14–13–5	5th	CCHA Quarterfinals
1991–92	Michigan State	26–10–8	18–7–7	3rd	NCAA Frozen Four
1992–93	Michigan State	24–14–2	18–10–2	4th	CCHA Second round
1993–94	Michigan State	23–13–4	17–8–5	3rd	NCAA regional quarterfinals
1994–95	Michigan State	25–12–3	17–7–3	3rd	NCAA regional quarterfinals
1995–96	Michigan State	28–13–1	22–7–1	T-3rd	NCAA regional quarterfinals
1996–97	Michigan State	23–13–4	16–7–4	3rd	NCAA regional quarterfinals
1997–98	Michigan State	33–6–5	21–5–4	1st	NCAA regional semifinals
1998–99	Michigan State	29–6–7	20–3–7	1st	NCAA Frozen Four
1999–00	Michigan State	27–11–4	18–8–2	2nd	NCAA regional quarterfinals
2000–01	Michigan State	33–5–4	21–4–3	1st	NCAA Frozen Four
2001–02	Michigan State	27–9–5	18–6–4	2nd	NCAA regional quarterfinals
Michigan State:		635–270–69			
Total:		924–380–83			
National champion Postseason invitational champion Conference regular season champion Conference regular season and conference tournament champion Division regular season champion Division regular season and conference tournament champion Conference tournament champion

== See also ==
- List of college men's ice hockey coaches with 400 wins
- Mason Cup

== Awards and honors ==
Award	Year
All-ECAC Hockey First Team	1961–62
ECAC Hockey All-Tournament First Team	1962
All-ECAC Hockey First Team	1962–63
ECAC Hockey All-Tournament Second Team	1963

Awards and achievements
Preceded by Award Created; Bill Selman; Bill Wilkinson; Frank Anzalone; John Markell	CCHA Coach of the Year; 1975–76; 1977–78, 1978–79; 1984–85; 1988–89, 1989–90; 1998–99	Succeeded by Bill Selman; Rick Comley; Bill Wilkinson; Jeff Jackson; Scott Borek
Preceded by Rick Comley	Spencer Penrose Award; 1991–92	Succeeded by George Gwozdecky
Preceded by Lefty Smith	Hobey Baker Legends of College Hockey Award; 2004	Succeeded by Murray Williamson
Sporting positions
Preceded by Amo Bessone	Michigan State Head Ice Hockey Coach; 1979–2002	Succeeded by Rick Comley
