= Rick Kennedy (ice hockey) =

Canadian ice hockey player

- Born: August 31, 1951 (age 75) Weston, Ontario, Canada
- Height: 5 ft 10 in (178 cm)
- Weight: 175 lb (79 kg; 12 st 7 lb)
- Position: Wing
- Shot: Left
- Played for: Saint Louis; Sioux City Musketeers
- NHL draft: Undrafted
- Playing career: 1971–1976

Richard Kennedy is a Canadian retired ice hockey winger and coach who was the NCAA Scoring Champion in 1972–73.

== Career ==
Kennedy was enticed to join the fairly new program at Saint Louis University in 1971 due to knowing that, being a new program, he could play top minutes straight away and that the Billikens played their home games in the St. Louis Arena, the home of the St. Louis Blues. After a decent freshman season, Kennedy's numbers exploded in his sophomore campaign; he led the nation in goals (47), assists (49) and points (96), leading the country's best offense to the top of the CCHA. Unfortunately, due to the low regard for the conference by most of college hockey, Kennedy's accomplishments went unrecognized outside of the CCHA. Due to this lack of respect, Saint Louis knew the conference tournament would be the end of their season. Despite dominating during the season, Saint Louis lost the opening game to Bowling Green and had to settle for second place.

As an upperclassmen, Kennedy's numbers declined as the team's strength of schedule improved but the Billikens were much more focused come playoff time, winning consecutive CCHA championships with Kennedy being named to the All-CCHA teams three years running. After graduating Kennedy played one season of senior hockey before hanging up his skates. He eventually became the head coach at Christian Brothers College and led the team to four MSCHA championships. He was inducted into the St. Louis Amateur Hockey Hall of Fame in 2010.

== Career statistics ==
=== Regular season and playoffs ===
			Regular Season					Playoffs
Season	Team	League	GP	G	A	Pts	PIM	GP	G	A	Pts	PIM
1970–71	North York Rangers	OHA-B	—	—	—	—	—	—	—	—	—	—
1971–72	Vancouver Nats	WHL	21	4	3	7	24	—	—	—	—	—
1971–72	Saint Louis	CCHA	—	—	—	36	—	—	—	—	—	—
1972–73	Saint Louis	CCHA	38	47	49	96	22	—	—	—	—	—
1973–74	Saint Louis	CCHA	37	28	30	58	10	—	—	—	—	—
1974–75	Saint Louis	CCHA	40	33	28	61	8	—	—	—	—	—
1975–76	Sioux City Musketeers	USHL	48	43	66	109	33	—	—	—	—	—

== Awards and honours ==
Award	Year
All-CCHA First Team	1972-73
CCHA All-Tournament Team	1973
All-CCHA Second Team	1973-74
All-CCHA First Team	1974-75

Awards and achievements
Preceded by Dave Skalko	NCAA Ice Hockey Scoring Champion; 1972–73	Succeeded by Steve Colp
