= Hobey Baker Legends of College Hockey Award =

NCAA award for one of the all-time great ice hockey contributors

The Hobey Baker Legends of College Hockey Award is an annual award presented by the Hobey Baker Memorial Award Committee to honor "one of the all-time great contributors to the game of college hockey."

In 1981, the Hobey Baker Memorial Award Committee established two annual awards. While the Hobey Baker Award is given to the individual selected as the outstanding NCAA men's ice hockey player of the current year, the "Legends of College Hockey Award" honors a player, coach, or administrator who has made outstanding historic contributions to the sport.

== Award winners ==
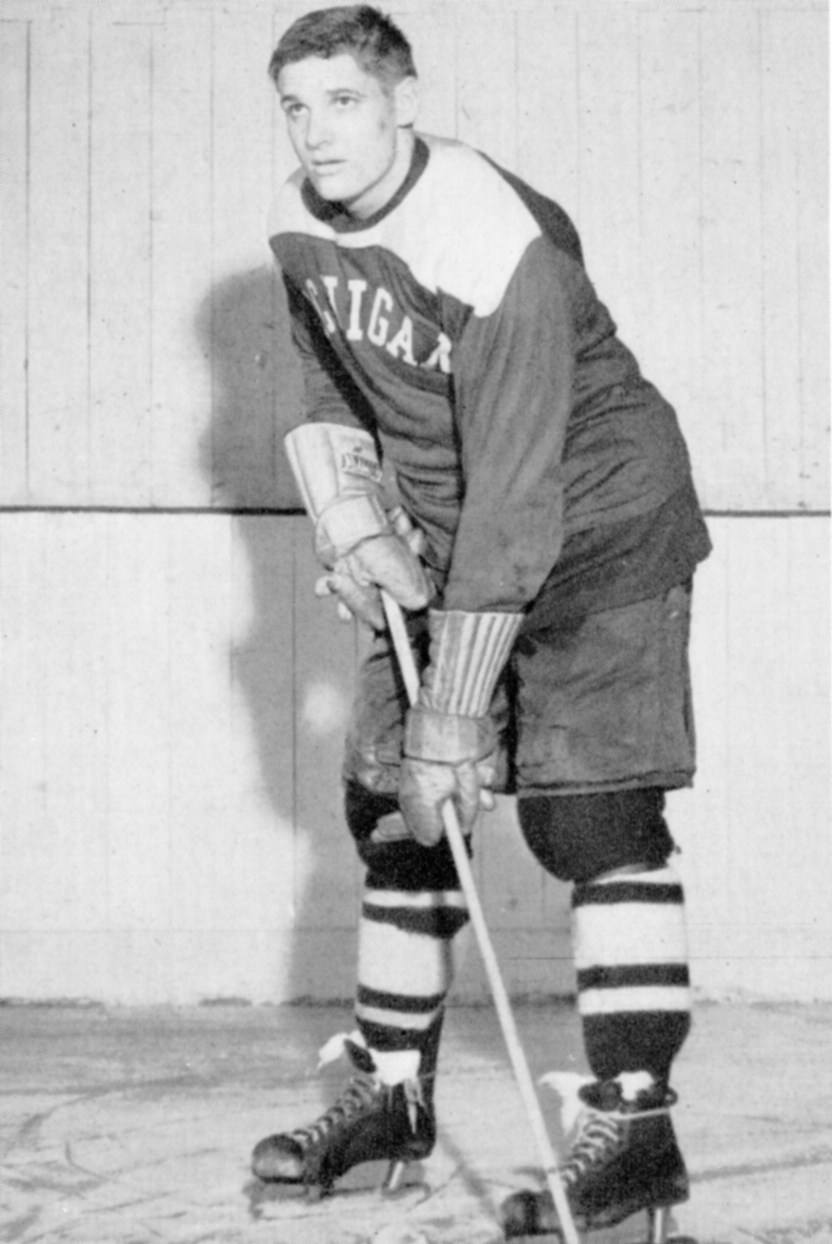
1990 recipient Al Renfrew

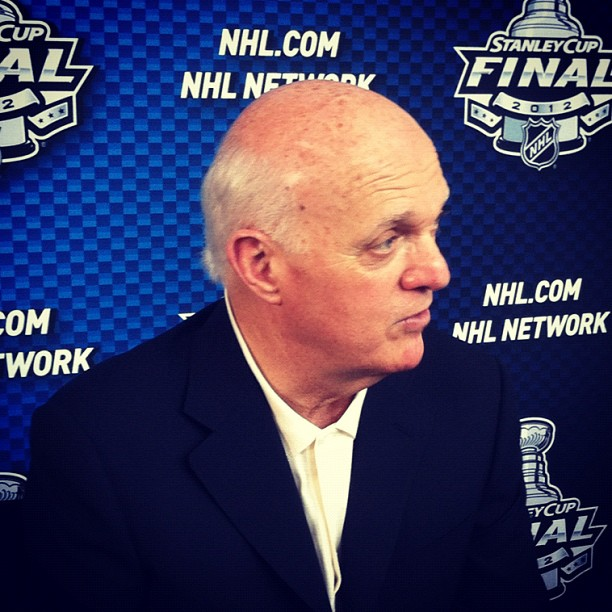
1997 recipient Lou Lamoriello

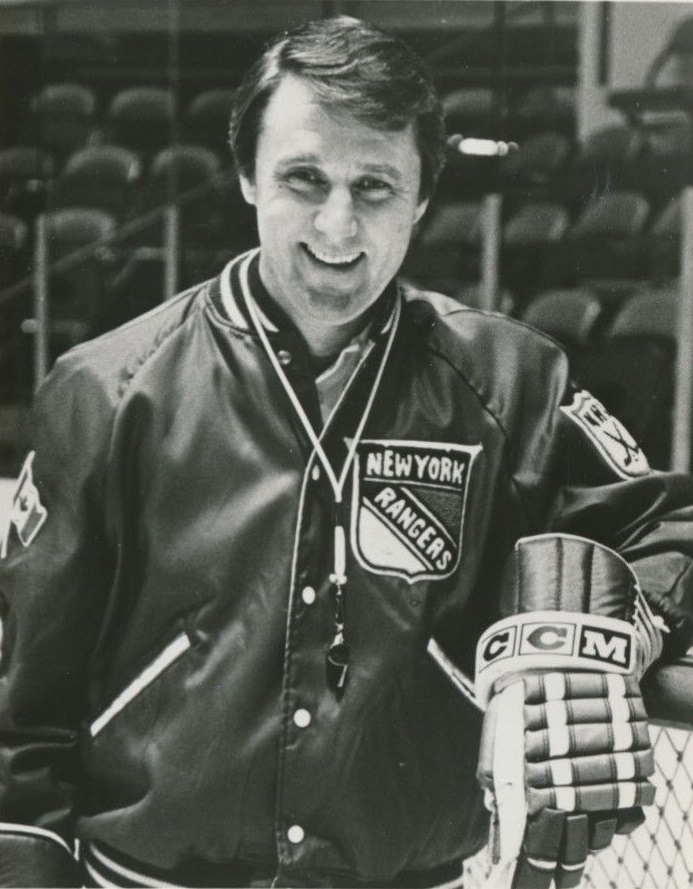
2011 recipient Herb Brooks

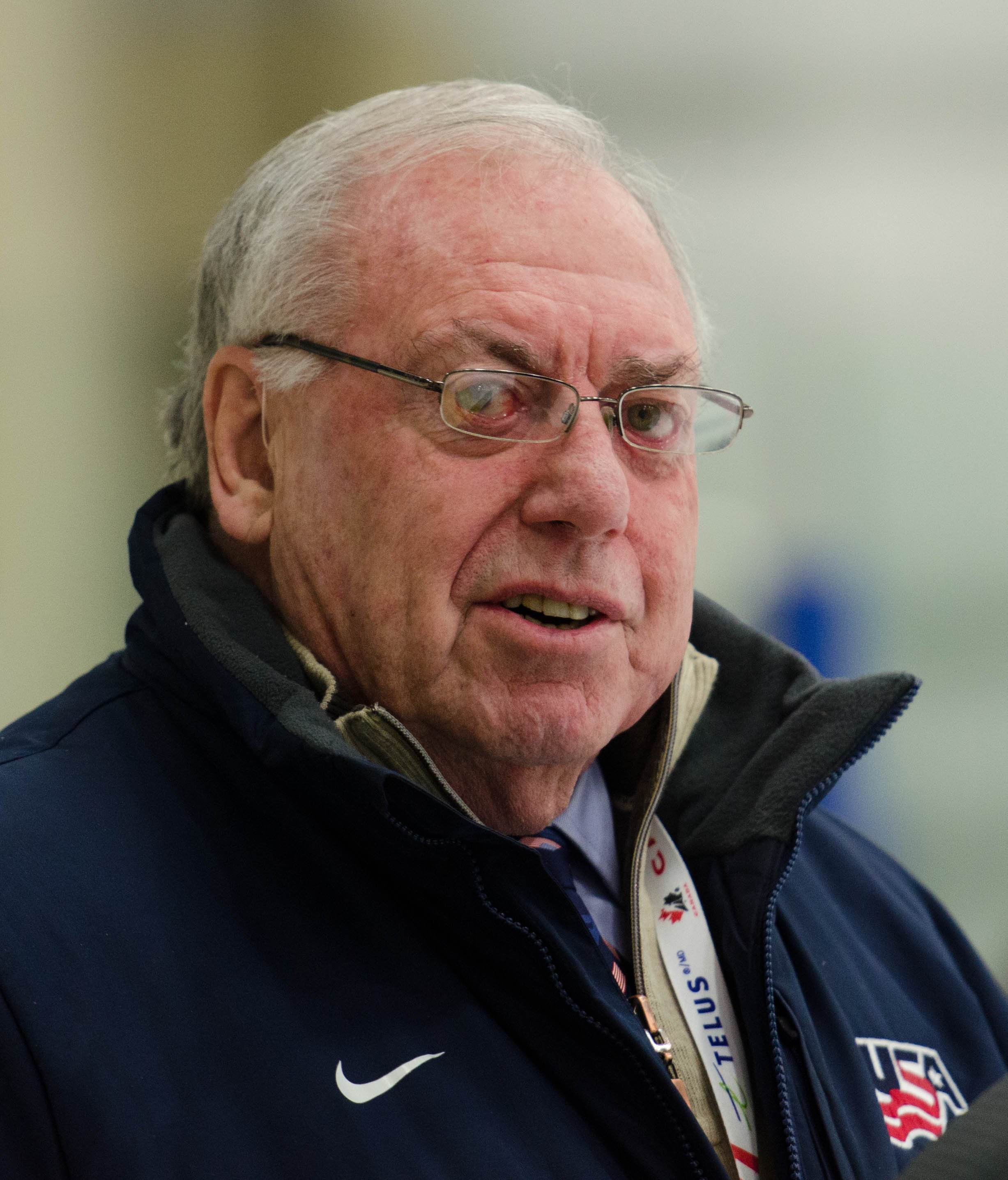
2013 recipient Jeff Sauer

Year	Winner	Position	School	Ref
1981	John "Snooks" Kelly	Coach	Boston College 1933–1942, 1946–1972	
1982	Vic Heyliger	Player, coach	Michigan 1934–1937 (player); Michigan 1944–1957; Air Force 1968–1974 (coach)	
1983	John Mariucci	Coach	Minnesota 1952–1955, 1956–1966	
1984	Murray Armstrong	Coach	Denver 1956–1977	
1985	Herb Gallagher	Player, coach, administrator	Northeastern 1931–1934 (player); Northeastern 1936–1942, 1946–1955 (coach); Northeastern 1955–1976 (administrator); founder of the Beanpot hockey tournament	
1986	Amo Bessone	Player, coach	Illinois 1940–1943 (player); Michigan Tech 1948–1951; Michigan State 1951–1979 (coach)	
1987	Murray Murdoch	Coach	Yale 1938–1965	
1988	Fido Purpur	Coach	North Dakota 1949–1956	
1989	Jim Fullerton	Coach	Brown 1955–1970	
1990	Al Renfrew	Player, coach	Michigan 1945–1949 (player); Michigan Tech 1951–1956; North Dakota 1956–1957; Michigan 1957–1973 (coach)	
1991	Jack Riley	Player, coach	Dartmouth 1940–1942, 1946–1947 (player); Army 1950–1986 (coach)	
1992	John "Connie" Pleban	Coach	U.S. Olympic Team 1952; U.S. National teams 1950, 1961, 1962; Minnesota-Duluth 1955–1959	
1993	Bill Cleary	Player, coach	Harvard 1953–1955 (player); Harvard 1971–1990 (coach)	
1994	Jack Kelley	Player, coach	Boston University 1949–1952 (player); Colby College 1955–1962, 1976–1977; Boston University 1962–1972 (coach)	
1995	John Mayasich	Player	Minnesota 1951–1955; US Olympic Teams 1956, 1960	
1996	Len Ceglarski	Player, coach	Boston College 1948–1951 (player); Clarkson 1958–1972; Boston College 1972–1992 (coach)	
1997	Lou Lamoriello	Player, coach, administrator	Providence 1962–1963 (player); Providence College 1968–1983 (coach); Providence 1983–1987 (administrator)	
1998	Ned Harkness	Coach	Rensselaer 1949–63; Cornell 1963–70; Union 1975–1978	
1999	John MacInnes	Player, coach	Michigan 1945–1950 (player); Michigan Tech 1956–1982 (coach)	
1999	Glen Sonmor	Coach	Ohio State 1965–1966; Minnesota 1966–1972	
2000	Bob Johnson	Player, coach	North Dakota 1950–1951 (player); Colorado College 1963–66; Wisconsin 1966–1975, 1976–1982 (coach)	
2001	Bob Peters	Player, coach	North Dakota 1957–1958 (player); North Dakota 1964–1966; Bemidji State 1966–1982, 1983–2001 (coach)	
2002	Sid Watson	Coach	Bowdoin 1960–1983	
2003	Lefty Smith	Coach	Notre Dame 1968–1987	
2004	Ron Mason	Player, coach	St. Lawrence 1960–1963 (player); Lake Superior State 1966–1973; Bowling Green 1973–1979; Michigan State 1979–2002 (coach)	
2005	Murray Williamson	Coach	US Olympic Team 1972	
2006	Cooney Weiland	Coach	Harvard 1950–71	
2007	Ed Saugestad	Player, coach	Augsburg 1958–1959 (player); Augsburg 1958–1990, 1992–1996 (coach)	
2008	Eddie Jeremiah	Player, coach	Dartmouth 1926–1930 (player); Dartmouth 1937–1942, 1945–1963, 1964–67 (coach)	
2009	Don Roberts	Coach	Gustavus Adolphus 1965–1996	
2010	Charlie Holt	Coach	Colby 1962–1968; New Hampshire 1968–86	
2011	Herb Brooks	Player, coach	Minnesota 1955–1959 (player); Minnesota 1972–1979, Saint Cloud State 1986–1987 (coach)	
2012	Fernie Flaman	Coach	Northeastern 1970–1989	
2013	Jeff Sauer	Player, coach	Colorado College 1962–1965 (player); Colorado College 1971–1982; Wisconsin 1982–2002 (coach)	
2014	Jack Parker	Player, coach	Boston University 1965–1968 (player); Boston University 1973–2013 (coach)	
2015	Tim Taylor	Player, coach	Harvard 1960–1963 (player); Yale 1976–1983, 1984–1993, 1994–2006; US Olympic Team 1994 (coach)	
2016	Bill Selman	Player, coach	North Dakota 1960–1963 (player); North Dakota 1966–1968; Minnesota–Duluth 1968–1970; St. Louis 1970–1979; Lake Superior State 1981–1983; US National Team 1982 (coach)	
2017	Bill Riley Jr.	Player, coach	Boston University 1965–1968 (player); UMass Lowell 1969–1991 (coach)	
2018	Red Berenson	Player, coach	Michigan 1959–1962 (player); Michigan 1984–2017 (coach)	
2019	Jim Cross	Player, coach	Boston University 1958–1960 (player); Vermont 1965–1984 (coach)	
2020	Rick Comley	Player, coach	Lake Superior State 1967–1971 (player); Lake Superior State 1973–1976; Northern Michigan 1976–2002; Michigan State 2002–2011 (coach)	
2021	Mike Sertich	Player, coach	Minnesota-Duluth 1966–1969 (player); Minnesota-Duluth 1982–2000; Michigan Tech 2000–2003; St. Scholastica 2010–2012 (coach)	
2022	John "Gino" Gasparini	Player, coach	North Dakota 1965–1968 (player); North Dakota 1969–1978 (assistant coach); North Dakota 1978–1994 (head coach)	
2023	Jerry York	Player, coach	Boston College 1963–1967 (player) Clarkson 1972–1979; Bowling Green 1979–1994; Boston College 1994–2022 (coach)	
2024	Don Lucia	Player, coach, administrator	Notre Dame 1977–1981 (player) Alaska Fairbanks 1987–1993; Colorado College 1993–1999; Minnesota 1999–2018 (coach) CCHA 2020–present (commissioner)	
2025	Dick Umile	Player, coach	New Hampshire 1969–1972 (player) Providence 1985–1987; New Hampshire 1988–1990 (assistant coach); New Hampshire 1990–2018 (coach)	
2026	Mike McShane	Player, coach	New Hampshire 1968–1971 (player) Dartmouth 1978–1980 (assistant coach); St. Lawrence 1980–1985; Providence 1985–1994; Norwich 1995–2018	
