= Jerry Welsh (ice hockey) =

Canadian college ice hockey player and coach (born 1950)

Biographical details
- Born: April 1950 (age 76); Oshawa, Ontario, Canada

Playing career
- 1969-1973: Ohio State
- 1973: Minnesota Fighting Saints
- 1973-1974: Mohawk Valley Comets
- 1974-1975: Johnstown Jets
- Position: Forward

Coaching career (HC unless noted)
- 1975–1995: Ohio State

Head coaching record
- Overall: 328-381-56 (.465)

Accomplishments and honors

Awards
- 1983 CCHA Coach of the Year

Gerald Wayne Welsh (born April 1950) is a Canadian former ice hockey player, and college ice hockey head coach at Ohio State University. He is a 2008 inductee of the Oshawa Sports Hall of Fame as both a player and a builder.

== Career as player ==
=== NCAA ===
Born in Oshawa, Ontario, Welsh played college ice hockey at Ohio State from 1969 to 1973. In 1971–72, Welsh led the team with 28 goals helping the Buckeyes earn their first and only Central Collegiate Hockey Association regular season title and the school's first CCHA tournament title. In three of Welsh's four years at Ohio State, he was voted the team's most valuable player.

=== Professional ===
Following college, Welsh played briefly for the Minnesota Fighting Saints of the World Hockey Association for his former Ohio State coach Harry Neale in 1973. He spent the next two seasons (1973–75) in the North American Hockey League. In 1974–75, Welsh was alternate captain and second-leading scorer for the NAHL's Johnstown Jets that won the Lockhart Cup playoffs. The team and championship served as the inspiration for the movie Slap Shot.

== Career as coach ==
Following his playing career in minor league hockey, Welsh, at just 25 years old, was hired as head coach at Ohio State in 1975. Welsh brought stability to an Ohio State program that had seen five different coaches in 11 seasons. Under Welsh, Ohio State finished in second place in the CCHA five times in six seasons between 1979 and 1984. In 1983, Welsh was named CCHA Coach of the Year after guiding the Buckeyes to a 21-7-4 conference record and a second-place finish (based on points).

Welsh helped elevate Ohio State to its first top ten national ranking in December 1978 and its first No. 1 national ranking for three of four weeks in November 1983 after beginning the 1983–84 season on a 13-game winning streak. The Buckeyes finished the 1978–79, 1979–80, 1982–83, and 1983–84 seasons nationally ranked in the top ten.

Despite success on the ice, Welsh was one of the lowest-paid head coaches in NCAA Division I ice hockey in 1984. Ohio State was also the only CCHA program without a full-time assistant coach. Welsh's frustration with funding for hockey at Ohio State led him to pursue other Division I coaching opportunities, which never came to fruition.

Welsh was unable to maintain early success at Ohio State. He resigned on February 14, 1995, when Ohio State athletic director Andy Geiger informed Welsh his contract would not be renewed at season's end.

== Personal ==
Welsh married the former Paula Konesny. Together, the couple owned and operated Garden Grove Bed & Breakfast in Union Pier, Michigan until they sold it in 2020.

== Head coaching record ==
Record table
| Season | Team | Overall | Conference | Standing | Postseason |
|---|---|---|---|---|---|
Ohio State Buckeyes (CCHA) (1975–1995)
| 1975–76 | Ohio State | 18-15-1 | 3-13-0 | 5th | |
| 1976–77 | Ohio State | 17-20-1 | 8-7-1 | 3rd | CCHA Semifinals |
| 1977–78 | Ohio State | 16-18-1 | 9-11-0 | 4th | CCHA Semifinals |
| 1978–79 | Ohio State | 25-13-2 | 15-8-1 | 2nd | CCHA Runner-Up |
| 1979–80 | Ohio State | 25-10-3 | 14-5-1 | 2nd | CCHA Semifinals |
| 1980–81 | Ohio State | 24-12-3 | 15-6-1 | 2nd | CCHA Runner-Up |
| 1981–82 | Ohio State | 16-17-1 | 10-17-1 | 10th | |
| 1982–83 | Ohio State | 26-9-5 | 21-7-4 | T-2nd | CCHA Consolation Game (Win) |
| 1983–84 | Ohio State | 30-10-1 | 21-9-0 | T-2nd | CCHA Consolation Game (Win) |
| 1984–85 | Ohio State | 19-20-2 | 13-17-2 | 6th | CCHA Consolation Game (Win) |
| 1985–86 | Ohio State | 23-19-1 | 16-15-1 | 5th | CCHA Quarterfinals |
| 1986–87 | Ohio State | 19-23-1 | 12-19-1 | 6th | CCHA Consolation Game (Win) |
| 1987–88 | Ohio State | 10-24-6 | 7-21-4 | 8th | CCHA Quarterfinals |
| 1988–89 | Ohio State | 9-26-5 | 7-20-5 | 8th | CCHA Quarterfinals |
| 1989–90 | Ohio State | 11-24-5 | 11-17-4 | T-5th | CCHA Quarterfinals |
| 1990–91 | Ohio State | 11-25-4 | 9-19-4 | 7th | CCHA Quarterfinals |
| 1991–92 | Ohio State | 12-21-5 | 8-19-5 | 8th | CCHA Quarterfinals |
| 1992–93 | Ohio State | 5-30-2 | 3-25-2 | 11th | CCHA First Round |
| 1993–94 | Ohio State | 7-23-5 | 6-19-5 | 10th | CCHA First Round |
| 1994–95 | Ohio State | 5-22-2† | 2-17-2† | - | - |
| Ohio State: | | 328-381-56 | | | |
| Total: | | 328-381-56 | | | |
National champion Postseason invitational champion Conference regular season champion Conference regular season and conference tournament champion Division regular season champion Division regular season and conference tournament champion Conference tournament champion

† Welsh resigned in January after losing 6 consecutive games.

== Awards and honours ==
| Award | Year |
|---|---|
| CCHA All-Tournament Team | 1972 |

Awards and achievements
| Preceded by Jerry York | CCHA Coach of the Year; 1982–83 | Succeeded by Bill Wilkinson |
