= Mason Cup =

U.S. collegiate ice hockey trophy

- Sport: Ice hockey
- Awarded for: CCHA Men's Ice Hockey Tournament champion

History
- First award: 2001 (on hiatus, 2014–2021)
- First winner: Michigan State
- Most recent: Minnesota State

The Mason Cup is the trophy awarded to the champion of the CCHA Men's Ice Hockey Tournament, the postseason championship event of the Central Collegiate Hockey Association, an NCAA Division I college ice hockey league. The Cup was awarded from 2001 until the original CCHA folded at the end of the 2012–13 season.

The CCHA was revived in 2020 by seven schools that had previously announced plans to leave the Western Collegiate Hockey Association at the end of the 2020–21 season, with an eighth school being invited shortly thereafter. On May 19, 2021, the new CCHA announced that the Mason Cup would return for the 2021–22 season as the championship trophy for the revived CCHA tournament.

== History ==
The cup was created in honor of Ron Mason, who coached three separate CCHA teams but is most remembered for his time at Michigan State. Mason ended his coaching career in 2002 and, at the time of his retirement, was the winningest coach in NCAA history with 924 victories.

== Winners ==
Total awards won
Wins	Team
5	Michigan
3	Notre Dame, Minnesota State
2	Michigan State,
1	Miami, Michigan Tech, Ohio State, Western Michigan

Year	Winner	Win #
2001	Michigan State	1
2002	Michigan	1
2003	Michigan	2
2004	Ohio State	1
2005	Michigan	3
2006	Michigan State	2
2007	Notre Dame	1
2008	Michigan	4
2009	Notre Dame	2
2010	Michigan	5
2011	Miami	1
2012	Western Michigan	1
2013	Notre Dame	3
2022	Minnesota State	1
2023	Minnesota State	2
2024	Michigan Tech	1
2025	Minnesota State	3

== See also ==
- CCHA Men's Ice Hockey Tournament
- List of CCHA Men's Ice Hockey Tournament champions
