= Frank Anzalone =

American ice hockey coach (born 1954)

Biographical details
- Born: March 15, 1954 (age 72); Brooklyn, New York, U.S.

Playing career
- 1973–1975: New Hampshire
- 1976–1978: Erie CC
- 1978–1979: Erie Blades
- Position: Center

Coaching career (HC unless noted)
- 1980–1981: Waterloo Black Hawks
- 1981–1982: Austin Mavericks
- 1982: Lake Superior State (assistant)
- 1983–1990: Lake Superior State
- 1990–1991: Newmarket Saints
- 1991–1992: Nashville Knights
- 1993–1998: Roanoke Express
- 1998–1999: Lowell Lock Monsters
- 1999–2001: Pee Dee Pride
- 2001–2005: Lake Superior State
- 2005–2007: Johnstown Chiefs
- 2009–2011: Quad City Mallards
- 2011–2013: Calgary Flames (scout)

Accomplishments and honors

Championships
- CCHA Regular Season Championship (1988); NCAA National Championship (1988)

Awards
- 1988 CCHA Coach of the Year; 1988 Spencer Penrose Award

Frank Anzalone (born March 15, 1954) is an American former ice hockey coach who led the Lake Superior State Lakers to their first national title in 1988.

== Career ==
=== Playing ===
Anzalone began playing for his native Brooklyn Stars of the NY-Metro league in 1970-71, moving on to play in Canada to play junior hockey. In 1971-72 he signed with Junior A Welland, then joined Port Colborne of the Junior B league. The next year he played for Western Junior B in Waterloo where he scored 47 points in 33 games, earning a partial scholarship at the New Hampshire in 1973–74, recording 13 points in 29 games. The following season saw him appear in only one match before he transferred, appearing for Erie CC almost two years later. Anzalone concluded his collegiate career after the 1977–78 season and made a brief appearance for the Erie Blades of the short-lived NEHL before retiring as a player.

=== Coaching ===
Anzalone got his first opportunity as head coach when he took over for the Waterloo Black Hawks in 1980–81, replacing Ken Yackel mid-season. The next year saw him as the full-time GM/head coach for the competing USHL team, Austin Mavericks. The team finished with an even record (24-24) and after the season Anzalone move on to accept an assistant coaching position at Lake Superior State. Anzlone soon found himself in a new position when Lakers head coach Bill Selman resigned mid-season to move back to St. Louis with Anzalone chosen as his successor.

Anzalone finished out his first partial season with a 5-10-1 record before he began building Lake Superior State into a decade-long powerhouse. he got the Lakers to an 18-20-2 mark in 1983–84 and the following year got the Lakers to a 27-win season, their first 20+ win season in 10 years. 1985 was also the first time Lake Superior had ever made an NCAA tournament appearance. The Lakers produced two more 20-win seasons the next two years before Anzalone led them to their breakout year. The 1987–88 Lakers won only their second regular season conference title (the first in 14 years) en route to the team's first ever 30-win season. The successful campaign allowed the Lakers to not only be invited to the 1988 NCAA Tournament, but receive a bye into the Quarterfinals despite losing the CCHA Title Game. After an initial setback against Merrimack, the Lakers rallied to take the series, meeting Maine in the semifinals. After downing the Black Bears 6–3, only St. Lawrence stood in their way of the National Title. In the end the Lakers were victorious, topping the Saints 4–3 in overtime. over the next two years Anzalone led the Lakers back to the NCAA tournament, but was unable to replicate the success of '88 and after the 1989–90 season he left Sault Ste. Marie to become a head coach in the AHL.

Anzalone's first season as the coach of a professional team landed flat and the Newmarket Saints finished dead last in their conference leading to his dismissal at the end of the season. The following year, now behind the bench for the Nashville Knights of the ECHL Anzalone was once again leading a cellar-dweller but wasn't given the opportunity to complete the year, being replaced by Nick Fotiu during the campaign. Anzalone took a season off before returning to coach an ECHL team, this time with the Roanoke Express. Anzalone was able to do much more with the Express, helping them reach the playoffs in each of his five seasons as head coach before he was once again offered an AHL job. He led the 1998–99 Lowell Lock Monsters to the playoffs with a (just barely) winning record but wasn't retained after the playoffs and found himself back in the ECHL the next season. Anzalone coached the Pee Dee Pride for 83 games before being replaced in the early part of the 2000–01 season.

Not out of work for long, it was announced in the spring of 2001 that Anzalone would return to the Lakers after they had fired Scott Borek. Lake Superior had fallen on hard times under Borek's five years and were looking for Anzalone to return them to their earlier success but his second stint in Sault Ste. Marie didn't bear fruit. In four seasons the Lakers never reached double-digit wins and finished last in the conference twice. Anzalone surrendered the reigns after the 2004–05 season and returned to the ECHL the following year. Anzalone coached the Johnstown Chiefs for two seasons, making the playoffs in both, before retiring following the 2007 playoffs.

Anzalone resurfaced a few years later to coach the Quad City Mallards for two years before retiring from coaching and becoming an amateur scout for the Calgary Flames. Anzalone remained in that position for two seasons before retiring from professional hockey following the 2012–13 season.

== Head coaching record ==
=== College ===
Record table
Season	Team	Overall	Conference	Standing	Postseason
Lake Superior State Lakers (CCHA) (1982–1990)
1982-83	Lake Superior State	5-10-1	5-10-1	11th	
1983-84	Lake Superior State	18-20-2	12-17-1	8th	CCHA Quarterfinals
1984-85	Lake Superior State	27-16-1	21-11-0	2nd	NCAA Quarterfinals
1985-86	Lake Superior State	24-18-1	17-14-1	4th	CCHA Consolation Game (Loss)
1986-87	Lake Superior State	22-16-2	19-11-2	3rd	CCHA Quarterfinals
1987-88	Lake Superior State	33-7-6	22-4-6	1st	NCAA National Champion
1988-89	Lake Superior State	29-11-6	19-7-6	2nd	NCAA Regional Quarterfinals
1989-90	Lake Superior State	33-10-3	24-6-2	2nd	NCAA Regional Quarterfinals
Lake Superior State:		191-108-22	139-80-19		
Lake Superior State Lakers (CCHA) (2001–2005)
2001-02	Lake Superior State	8-27-2	4-22-2	12th	CCHA First Round
2002-03	Lake Superior State	6-28-4	3-24-1	12th	CCHA First Round
2003-04	Lake Superior State	9-20-7	7-16-5	11th	CCHA First Round
2004-05	Lake Superior State	9-22-7	8-14-6	9th	CCHA First Round
Lake Superior State:		32-97-20	22-76-14		
Total:		223-205-42			
National champion Postseason invitational champion Conference regular season champion Conference regular season and conference tournament champion Division regular season champion Division regular season and conference tournament champion Conference tournament champion

Awards and achievements
Preceded by Val Belmonte	CCHA Coach of the Year; 1987–88	Succeeded by Ron Mason
Preceded by John Gasparini	Spencer Penrose Award; 1987–88	Succeeded by Joe Marsh
Sporting positions
Preceded by Toby O'Brien	Head coaches of the Johnstown Chiefs; 2005-2007	Succeeded by Ian Herbers
