= Bob Sykes (ice hockey) =

Canadian ice hockey player

- Born: September 26, 1951 (age 74) Sudbury, Ontario, Canada
- Height: 6 ft 0 in (183 cm)
- Weight: 200 lb (91 kg; 14 st 4 lb)
- Position: Left wing
- Shot: Left
- Played for: Toronto Maple Leafs
- NHL draft: 65th overall, 1971; Toronto Maple Leafs
- Playing career: 1973–1977

Robert John William Sykes (born September 26, 1951) is a Canadian former professional ice hockey player who played two games in the National Hockey League with the Toronto Maple Leafs during the 1974–75 season. The remainder of his career, which lasted from 1973 to 1977, was spent in the minor leagues.

== Career statistics ==
=== Regular season and playoffs ===
| | | | Regular season | | | | | Playoffs |
| Season | Team | League | GP | G | A | Pts | PIM | GP | G | A | Pts | PIM |
|---|---|---|---|---|---|---|---|---|---|---|---|---|
| 1968–69 | Sudbury Cub-Wolves | NOJHL | — | — | — | — | — | 1 | 0 | 0 | 0 | 0 |
| 1969–70 | Sudbury Cub-Wolves | NOJHL | 45 | 18 | 23 | 41 | 79 | — | — | — | — | — |
| 1970–71 | Sudbury Cub-Wolves | NOJHL | 48 | 48 | 59 | 107 | 26 | — | — | — | — | — |
| 1971–72 | Saint Louis University | CCHA | 32 | 16 | 23 | 39 | 22 | — | — | — | — | — |
| 1972–73 | Saint Louis University | CCHA | 15 | 17 | 22 | 39 | 16 | — | — | — | — | — |
| 1973–74 | Oklahoma City Blazers | CHL | 50 | 13 | 11 | 24 | 19 | 8 | 2 | 1 | 3 | 2 |
| 1974–75 | Toronto Maple Leafs | NHL | 2 | 0 | 0 | 0 | 0 | — | — | — | — | — |
| 1974–75 | Oklahoma City Blazers | CHL | 73 | 30 | 21 | 51 | 24 | 5 | 1 | 2 | 3 | 0 |
| 1975–76 | Oklahoma City Blazers | CHL | 52 | 17 | 6 | 23 | 44 | — | — | — | — | — |
| 1975–76 | Saginaw Gears | IHL | 1 | 0 | 3 | 3 | 0 | — | — | — | — | — |
| 1976–77 | Orillia Terriers | OHA Sr | 10 | 2 | 1 | 3 | 11 | — | — | — | — | — |
| CHL totals | | | 175 | 60 | 38 | 98 | 87 | 13 | 3 | 3 | 6 | 2 |
| NHL totals | | | 2 | 0 | 0 | 0 | 0 | — | — | — | — | — |
