= 1973 CCHA men's ice hockey tournament =

1973 CCHA Men's ice hockey tournament
- Dates: March 2–4, 1973
- Teams: 3
- Finals site: St. Louis Arena; St. Louis, Missouri
- Champions: Bowling Green (1st title)
- Winning coach: Jack Vivian (1st title)
- CCHA Men's Ice Hockey Tournaments

The 1973 CCHA Men's Ice Hockey Tournament was the second CCHA Men's Ice Hockey Tournament. It was played between March 2 and March 4, 1973, at St. Louis Arena in St. Louis, Missouri. Bowling Green won the tournament, finishing the round robin with a 2–0 record.

== Conference standings ==
Note: GP = Games played; W = Wins; L = Losses; T = Ties; PTS = Points; GF = Goals For; GA = Goals Against

1972–73 Central Collegiate Hockey Association standings
	Conference							Overall					
	GP	W	L	T	PTS	GF	GA	GP	W	L	T	GF	GA
Saint Louis†	16	13	3	0	26	116	52	38	27	11	0	266	162
Lake Superior State	12	9	3	0	18	82	53	30	20	10	0	201	129
Ohio State	14	7	7	0	14	76	65	30	18	11	1	179	141
Bowling Green*	16	6	10	0	12	95	94	35	16	19	0	193	191
Ohio	14	1	13	0	2	36	141	24	6	18	0	—	—
Championship: Bowling Green † indicates conference regular season champion * indicates conference tournament champion

== Round robin ==
Team	GP	W	L	PTS	GF	GA
Bowling Green	2	2	0	4	14	6
Saint Louis	2	1	1	2	16	10
Ohio State	2	0	2	0	5	19

=== Results ===
==== (1) Saint Louis vs. (4) Bowling Green ====
March 2	Saint Louis	5 – 6	OT	Bowling Green	St. Louis Arena

==== (1) Saint Louis vs. (3) Ohio State ====
March 3	Saint Louis	11 – 4	Ohio State	St. Louis Arena

==== (3) Ohio State vs. (4) Bowling Green ====
March 4	Ohio State	1 – 8	Bowling Green	St. Louis Arena

== Tournament awards ==
=== All-Tournament Team ===
- F Bruce Woodhouse (Bowling Green)
- F John Stewart (Bowling Green)
- F Rick Kennedy (Saint Louis)
- D Jan Kascak (Saint Louis)
- D Roger Archer (Bowling Green)
- G Ralph Kloiber (Saint Louis)
