= Ed Saugestad =

American ice hockey coach

Biographical details
- Born: January, 1937; Minneapolis, Minnesota, U.S.
- Died: March 20, 2014 (aged 77); Minneapolis, Minnesota, U.S.

Playing career

Ice hockey
- 1958–1959: Augsburg

Coaching career (HC unless noted)

Ice hockey
- 1958–1996: Augsburg

Football
- 1970–1971: Augsburg

Administrative career (AD unless noted)
- 1981–1987: Augsburg

Head coaching record
- Overall: 503–364–21 (ice hockey); 2–16 (football)

Edwin Jeffrey Saugestad (January, 1937 – March 20, 2014) was an American ice hockey coach. From 1958 to 1996, he was the head hockey coach at Augsburg College in Minneapolis, Minnesota. He led the Augsburg hockey team to three National Association of Intercollegiate Athletics men's ice hockey championships and six consecutive Minnesota Intercollegiate Athletic Conference championships from 1976 to 1982. At the time of his retirement in 1996, he ranked second in career wins in NCAA Division III history. He received the John MacInnes Award in 2002 for his lifetime of contributions to amateur hockey and the Hobey Baker Legends of College Hockey Award in 2007. As of 2010, he ranks 18th all-time among college men's ice hockey coaches with 503 wins.

== Augsburg College ==
Saugestad became the hockey coach at Augsburg College during his senior year at the school. He was both a player and coach on the team during the 1958–59 hockey season. Saugestad graduated in 1959 with a double major in physical education and biology. He also received a master's degree from the University of Minnesota in 1964.

With the exception of a sabbatical in the 1990–91 academic year, Saugestad was the head ice hockey coach at Augsburg from the 1958–59 season through the 1995–96 season. In 37 years as the head hockey coach, he led Augsburg to three National Association of Intercollegiate Athletics ("NAIA") national hockey championships in 1978, 1981 and 1982. His Augsburg hockey teams also won six consecutive Minnesota Intercollegiate Athletic Conference ("MIAC") championships from 1976 to 1982 and appeared in ten post-season tournaments. He coached 22 players who received All-American honors at Augsburg.

Saugestad was also an instructor in the Health & Physical Education Department until 1996 and taught classes in, among other things, the physiology of exercise and health. He also served on the coaching staff for Augsburg's football team from 1959 to 1984. In December 1969, Saugestad was named the head football coach after Edor Nelson resigned the position. Saugestad was the head football coach during the 1970 and 1971 football seasons. From 1981 to 1987, he was also Augsburg's men's athletic director.

In the fall of 1995, Saugestad's left kidney shut down, and he underwent six surgeries to diagnose and remove a non-malignant growth. As a result of his health problems, Saugestad announced at the end of November 1995 that the 1995–96 hockey season would be his last as a coach. He told reporters that his health problems had made him reorder his priorities, "It made me think about what things I wanted to do, like go backpacking off in the Boundary Waters." The Minneapolis Star-Tribune wrote at the time, "Kidney problems have accomplished what no opposing team or set of circumstances could: Force Ed Saugestad from his beloved coaching after this season."

Saugestad recorded his 500th career victory in January 1996 with a 5-4 win over Bethel University. Saugestad said at the time, "I have to say, I'm kind of glad to get it out of the way and get back to normal. Everyone kept talking about it. ... Now that it's done, it's quite a milestone. It's wonderful. It took a lot of guys to get it for me." In his final game as Augsburg's coach, freshman goalie Shawn Mullan stopped 45 shots, and Augsburg scored six unanswered goals to beat Gustavus Adolphus College for Saugestad's 503rd and final career win.

== Career coaching record and honors ==
At the time of his retirement, Saugestad was the second winningest hockey coach in NCAA Division III history. He has received many awards and honors for his contributions to college ice hockey. These include:

- NAIA Coach of the Year in 1978, 1981 and 1982 and the MIAC Coach of the Year six times.
- In 1987, Saugestad was inducted into the Augsburg College Hall of Fame.
- The State of Minnesota declared February 17, 1996, the day of Saugestad's last game as the hockey coach at Augsburg, as "Ed Saugestad Day."
- In 1998, the MIAC renamed its championship trophy in hockey as the Ed Saugestad Trophy.
- In 2002, the American Hockey Coaches Association awarded the John MacInnes Award to Saugestad for his lifetime of contributions to amateur hockey.
- In 2007, the Hobey Baker Memorial Award Foundation presented Saugestad with its Hobey Baker Legends of College Hockey Award.
- In 2009, Augsburg College announced plans to rename its main ice rink the Ed Saugestad Rink at Augsburg Ice Arena. The naming ceremony for Ed Saugestad Rink is scheduled for October 16, 2010.

== Head coaching record ==
=== Ice hockey ===
Record table
Season	Team	Overall	Conference	Standing	Postseason
Augsburg Auggies (MIAC) (1959–1996)
1958–59	Augsburg	9–5–0			
1959–60	Augsburg	10–2–0	6–2–0	2nd	
1960–61	Augsburg	3–8–0	2–5–0		
1961–62	Augsburg	9–3–0	6–1–0	2nd	
1962–63	Augsburg	12–6–0	9–5–0		
1963–64	Augsburg	7–9–0	4–8–0		
1964–65	Augsburg	8–7–1	7–5–1	8th	
1965–66	Augsburg	12–3–0	11–3–0	T–2nd	
1966–67	Augsburg	9–7–0	9–5–0	4th	
1967–68	Augsburg	13–5–1	11–3–0	2nd	
1968–69	Augsburg	14–4–1	11–2–1	2nd	
1969–70	Augsburg	8–8–0	6–8–0		
1970–71	Augsburg	14–6–0	9–5–0	4th	NAIA Third Place Game (Win)
1971–72	Augsburg	11–10–0	7–7–0	5th	
1972–73	Augsburg	14–11–0	11–3–0	2nd	NAIA First Round
1973–74	Augsburg	10–12–0	9–5–0	4th	
1974–75	Augsburg	18–9–0	13–3–0	2nd	NAIA Third Place Game (Loss)
1975–76	Augsburg	12–12–0	10–4–0	2nd	NAIA Quarterfinals
1976–77	Augsburg	19–7–1	12–2–0	T–1st	NAIA Third Place Game (Loss)
1977–78	Augsburg	22–6–0	13–1–0	1st	NAIA Champion
1978–79	Augsburg	23–4–1	13–0–1	1st	NAIA Quarterfinals
1979–80	Augsburg	20–8–0	14–2–0	1st	NAIA Quarterfinals
1980–81	Augsburg	24–6–0	12–4–0	T–1st	NAIA Champion
1981–82	Augsburg	28–1–1	16–0–0	1st	NAIA Champion
1982–83	Augsburg	19–9–0	13–3–0	2nd	WIHL Quarterfinals
1983–84	Augsburg	21–13–1	10–6–0	3rd	NCAA Third Place Game (Loss)
1984–85	Augsburg	14–12–0	9–7–0	5th	
1985–86	Augsburg	10–17–0	7–9–0	6th	
1986–87	Augsburg	8–18–1	6–10–0	T–7th	
1987–88	Augsburg	5–22–0	4–12–0	8th	
1988–89	Augsburg	11–15–2	8–7–1	4th	MIAC Semifinals
1989–90	Augsburg	11–15–2	4–10–2	7th	
1990–91	Augsburg	9–16–0	5–11–0	7th	
1991–92	Augsburg	11–12–4	7–7–2	5th	
1992–93	Augsburg	11–15–0	8–8–0	4th	MIAC Semifinals
1993–94	Augsburg	11–17–1	9–6–1	T–4th	MIAC Semifinals
1994–95	Augsburg	14–9–2	10–4–2	4th	MIAC Semifinals
1995–96	Augsburg	8–15–2	7–8–1	5th	
Augsburg:		503–364–21			
Total:		503–364–21			
National champion Postseason invitational champion Conference regular season champion Conference regular season and conference tournament champion Division regular season champion Division regular season and conference tournament champion Conference tournament champion

=== Football ===
Year	Team	Overall	Conference	Standing	Bowl/playoffs
Augsburg Auggies (Minnesota Intercollegiate Athletic Conference) (1970–1971)
1970	Augsburg	1–8	1–6	T–7th	
1971	Augsburg	1–8	0–7	8th	
Augsburg:		2–16	1–15		
Total:		2–16			

== See also ==
- List of college men's ice hockey coaches with 400 wins

Awards and achievements
Preceded by Cooney Weiland	Hobey Baker Legends of College Hockey Award; 2007	Succeeded by Eddie Jeremiah
