= Terry Shercliffe =

Biographical details
- Born: Regina, Saskatchewan, Canada
- Education: University of Minnesota Duluth

Playing career
- 1962–1965: Minnesota–Duluth
- Position: Center

Coaching career (HC unless noted)
- 1967–1970: Minnesota–Duluth (assistant)
- 1970–1975: Minnesota–Duluth
- 1976–1986: Moorhead High School
- 1986–2007: Moorhead High School (assistant)
- 2010–2014: Fargo Force (assistant)

Head coaching record
- Overall: 82–92–7 (.472) [college]

Terry Shercliffe is a retired ice hockey player and head coach. He was in charge of the program at Minnesota–Duluth before coaching at Moorhead High School for over thirty years.

== Career ==
Shercliffe played for Minnesota–Duluth for three seasons in the early 1960s shortly after they elevated their program to the upper classification. He joined the staff at his alma mater as an assistant in 1967 and was promoted to head coach when Bill Selman accepted the position at Saint Louis. In his first three seasons behind the bench the Bulldogs produced middling records, hovering around the .500 mark. His fourth year saw the team post its first ever 20+ win season but followed it up with a horrible 10-24-4 record. The fact that he had gone 1-9 in conference tournament play over his five-year tenure also contributed to him leaving after the 1974–75 season.

A year later Shercliffe was introduced as the new head coach at Moorhead High School. He remained at the position for ten years before turning control over to Terry Cullen but stayed on as an assistant for another 21 seasons. After retiring in 2007 Shercliffe resurfaced as an assistant with the Fargo Force in 2010, staying with the team for four seasons before retiring once more in 2014.

== Head coaching record ==
=== College ===
Record table
Season	Team	Overall	Conference	Standing	Postseason
Minnesota–Duluth Bulldogs (WCHA) (1970–1975)
1970–71	Minnesota–Duluth	16–17–1	10–14–0	6th	WCHA West Regional Finals
1971–72	Minnesota–Duluth	16–18–1	15–13–0	5th	WCHA First Round
1972–73	Minnesota–Duluth	19–17–0	13–15–0	8th	WCHA First Round
1973–74	Minnesota–Duluth	21–16–1	13–14–1	6th	WCHA First Round
1974–75	Minnesota–Duluth	10–24–4	9–20–3	8th	WCHA First Round
Minnesota–Duluth:		82–92–7	60–76–4		
Total:		82–92–7			
National champion Postseason invitational champion Conference regular season champion Conference regular season and conference tournament champion Division regular season champion Division regular season and conference tournament champion Conference tournament champion
