= 1984 CCHA men's ice hockey tournament =

Sports tournament

1984 CCHA Men's ice hockey tournament
- Dates: March 2–10, 1984
- Teams: 8
- Finals site: Joe Louis Arena; Detroit, Michigan
- Champions: Michigan State (3rd title)
- Winning coach: Ron Mason (6th title)
- MVP: Glenn Healy (Western Michigan)
- CCHA Men's Ice Hockey Tournaments

The 1984 CCHA Men's Ice Hockey Tournament was the 13th CCHA Men's Ice Hockey Tournament. It was played between March 2 and March 10, 1984. First round games were played at campus sites, while 'final four' games were played at Joe Louis Arena in Detroit, Michigan. By winning the tournament, Michigan State received the Central Collegiate Hockey Association's automatic bid to the 1984 NCAA Division I Men's Ice Hockey Tournament.

== Format ==
The tournament featured three rounds of play. The four teams that finished below eighth place in the standings were not eligible for postseason play. In the quarterfinals, the first and eighth seeds, the second and seventh seeds, the third seed and sixth seeds and the fourth seed and fifth seeds played a two-game series where the team that scored the higher number of goals after the games was declared the victor and advanced to the semifinals. In the semifinals, the remaining highest and lowest seeds and second highest and second lowest seeds play a single-game, with the winners advancing to the finals. The tournament champion receives an automatic bid to the 1984 NCAA Division I Men's Ice Hockey Tournament.

== Conference standings ==
Note: GP = Games played; W = Wins; L = Losses; T = Ties; PTS = Points; GF = Goals For; GA = Goals Against

1983–84 Central Collegiate Hockey Association standings
	Conference							Overall					
	GP	W	L	T	PTS	GF	GA	GP	W	L	T	GF	GA
Bowling Green†	28	22	4	2	.821	146	95	44	34	8	2	228	146
Ohio State	30	21	9	0	.700	155	96	41	30	10	1	212	133
Michigan State*	30	21	9	0	.700	162	90	46	34	12	0	241	129
Northern Michigan	30	16	14	0	.533	126	118	40	17	22	1	155	161
Western Michigan	28	13	14	1	.482	125	114	42	22	18	2	187	168
Michigan Tech	30	14	16	0	.467	123	128	41	19	21	1	160	167
Ferris State	30	13	15	2	.467	128	138	41	18	20	3	184	184
Lake Superior State	30	12	17	1	.417	103	127	40	18	20	2	152	176
Michigan	30	11	18	1	.383	105	148	37	14	22	1	134	179
Miami	30	10	20	0	.333	116	156	37	13	23	1	149	188
Illinois-Chicago	28	5	22	1	.196	83	162	35	5	29	1	106	221
Championship: Michigan State † indicates conference regular season champion * indicates conference tournament champion

== Bracket ==
Quarterfinals; March 2–4
1	Bowling Green	7	6	–
8	Lake Superior State	3	7	–
2	Ohio State	5	6	–
7	Ferris State	2	1	–
(Pairings are reseeded after the first round)
3	Michigan State	5	3	–
6	Michigan Tech	3	1	–
4	Northern Michigan	2	4	–
5	Western Michigan	3	4	–

Semifinals; March 8
1	Bowling Green	3
5	Western Michigan	4**
2	Ohio State	1
3	Michigan State	8

Championship; March 10
3	Michigan State	5
5	Western Michigan	0
Consolation Game
1	Bowling Green	2
2	Ohio State	3*

Note: * denotes overtime period(s)

=== First round ===
==== (1) Bowling Green vs. (8) Lake Superior State ====
Bowling Green	7 – 3	Lake Superior State	BGSU Ice Arena

Bowling Green	6 – 7	Lake Superior State	BGSU Ice Arena

Bowling Green won series 13–10

==== (2) Ohio State vs. (7) Ferris State ====
Ohio State	5 – 2	Ferris State	OSU Ice Rink

Ohio State	6 – 1	Ferris State	OSU Ice Rink

Ohio State won series 11–3

==== (3) Michigan State vs. (6) Michigan Tech ====
Michigan State	5 – 3	Michigan Tech	Munn Ice Arena

Michigan State	3 – 1	Michigan Tech	Munn Ice Arena

Michigan State won series 8–4

==== (4) Northern Michigan vs. (5) Western Michigan ====
Northern Michigan	2 – 3	Western Michigan	Lakeview Arena

Northern Michigan	4 – 4	Western Michigan	Lakeview Arena

Western Michigan won series 7–6

=== Semifinals ===
==== (1) Bowling Green vs. (5) Western Michigan ====
March 8	Bowling Green	3 – 4	2OT	Western Michigan	Joe Louis Arena

==== (2) Ohio State vs. (3) Michigan State ====
March 8	Ohio State	1 – 8	Michigan State	Joe Louis Arena

=== Consolation Game ===
==== (1) Bowling Green vs. (2) Ohio State ====
March 10	Bowling Green	2 – 3	OT	Ohio State	Joe Louis Arena

=== Championship ===
==== (3) Michigan State vs. (5) Western Michigan ====
March 10	Michigan State	5 – 0	Western Michigan	Joe Louis Arena

== Tournament awards ==
=== All-Tournament Team ===
- F Dan Dorion (Western Michigan)
- F Gord Flegel (Michigan State)
- F Newell Brown (Michigan State)
- D Jeff Eisley (Michigan State)
- D Dave Ellett (Bowling Green)
- G Norm Foster (Michigan State)

=== MVP ===
- Glenn Healy (Western Michigan)
