= Lindsay Middlebrook =

Canadian ice hockey player (born 1955)

- Born: September 7, 1955 (age 70) Collingwood, Ontario, Canada
- Height: 5 ft 7 in (170 cm)
- Weight: 160 lb (73 kg; 11 st 6 lb)
- Position: Goaltender
- Caught: Right
- Played for: Winnipeg Jets; Minnesota North Stars; New Jersey Devils; Edmonton Oilers
- NHL draft: Undrafted
- Playing career: 1978–1983

Lindsay Middlebrook (born September 7, 1955) is a Canadian former professional ice hockey goaltender. He played in the National Hockey League (NHL) with the Winnipeg Jets, Minnesota North Stars, New Jersey Devils and Edmonton Oilers between 1979 and 1983. As a youth, he played in the 1968 Quebec International Pee-Wee Hockey Tournament with a minor ice hockey team from Toronto.

== Career statistics ==
=== Regular season and playoffs ===
			Regular season									Playoffs
Season	Team	League	GP	W	L	T	MIN	GA	SO	GAA	SV%	GP	W	L	MIN	GA	SO	GAA	SV%
1973–74	Saint Louis University	CCHA	2	0	1	0	41	6	0	8.82	.739	—	—	—	—	—	—	—	—
1974–75	Saint Louis University	CCHA	24	—	—	—	1459	71	1	2.98	.889	—	—	—	—	—	—	—	—
1975–76	Saint Louis University	CCHA	30	—	—	—	1767	88	0	2.99	—	—	—	—	—	—	—	—	—
1976–77	Saint Louis University	CCHA	18	—	—	—	1058	54	1	3.07	.893	—	—	—	—	—	—	—	—
1977–78	New Haven Nighthawks	AHL	17	5	9	3	968	71	0	4.40	.872	—	—	—	—	—	—	—	—
1977–78	Toledo Goaldiggers	IHL	16	—	—	—	949	45	2	2.85	—	13	—	—	739	32	0	2.60	—
1978–79	New Haven Nighthawks	AHL	54	29	19	5	3221	173	1	3.22	.887	5	2	3	301	16	0	3.19	—
1979–80	Winnipeg Jets	NHL	10	2	8	0	578	40	0	4.15	.877	—	—	—	—	—	—	—	—
1979–80	Tulsa Oilers	CHL	37	16	15	3	2073	102	0	2.95	.900	2	0	2	119	8	0	4.03	—
1980–81	Winnipeg Jets	NHL	14	0	9	3	652	65	0	5.99	.840	—	—	—	—	—	—	—	—
1980–81	Tulsa Oilers	CHL	36	17	16	2	2115	120	2	3.63	.887	8	4	4	479	33	0	4.13	—
1981–82	Minnesota North Stars	NHL	3	0	0	2	140	7	0	3.00	.900	—	—	—	—	—	—	—	—
1981–82	Nashville South Stars	CHL	31	17	11	2	1868	93	3	2.99	.904	3	0	3	179	11	0	3.69	—
1982–83	New Jersey Devils	NHL	9	0	6	1	411	37	0	5.40	.832	—	—	—	—	—	—	—	—
1982–83	Edmonton Oilers	NHL	1	1	0	0	60	3	0	3.00	.909	—	—	—	—	—	—	—	—
1982–83	Moncton Alpines	AHL	11	6	4	1	669	42	0	3.77	.875	—	—	—	—	—	—	—	—
1982–83	Wichita Wind	CHL	13	6	7	0	779	46	1	3.54	.875	—	—	—	—	—	—	—	—
1983–84	Montana Magic	CHL	36	10	22	3	2104	162	0	4.62	.905	—	—	—	—	—	—	—	—
1984–85	Toledo Goaldiggers	IHL	50	18	25	3	2791	183	0	3.93	—	6	2	4	339	24	0	4.25	—
1985–86	Milwaukee Admirals	IHL	56	33	10	0	3318	191	3	3.45	—	5	1	4	298	18	0	3.62	—
NHL totals			37	3	23	6	1841	152	0	4.95	.856	—	—	—	—	—	—	—	—

== Awards and honours ==
Award	Year
All-CCHA First Team	1974–75
CCHA All-Tournament Team	1975
