= 1974 CCHA men's ice hockey tournament =

1974 CCHA Men's ice hockey tournament
- Dates: March 8–10, 1974
- Teams: 4
- Finals site: St. Louis Arena; St. Louis, Missouri
- Champions: Saint Louis (1st title)
- Winning coach: Bill Selman (1st title)
- CCHA Men's Ice Hockey Tournaments

The 1974 CCHA Men's Ice Hockey Tournament was the third CCHA Men's Ice Hockey Tournament. It was played between March 8 and March 10, 1974, at St. Louis Arena in St. Louis, Missouri. Saint Louis won the tournament, defeating Lake Superior State 8–3 in the championship game.

== Conference standings ==
Note: GP = Games played; W = Wins; L = Losses; T = Ties; PTS = Points; GF = Goals For; GA = Goals Against

1973–74 Central Collegiate Hockey Association standings
	Conference							Overall					
	GP	W	L	T	PTS	GF	GA	GP	W	L	T	GF	GA
Lake Superior State†	8	5	3	0	10	40	33	39	22	16	1	205	159
Saint Louis*	8	5	3	0	10	35	37	40	28	12	0	224	165
Bowling Green	8	2	6	0	4	32	37	39	20	19	0	217	167
Championship: Saint Louis † indicates conference regular season champion * indicates conference tournament champion

== Bracket ==
Semifinals; March 8, 1974
1	Lake Superior State	6
Western Michigan	2
3	Saint Louis	6
2	Bowling Green	1

Championship; March 10, 1974
1	Lake Superior State	3
2	Saint Louis	8
Third place
3	Bowling Green	11
Western Michigan	4

=== Semifinals ===
==== (1) Lake Superior State vs. Western Michigan ====
March 8	Lake Superior State	6 – 2	Western Michigan	St. Louis Arena

==== (2) Saint Louis vs. (3) Bowling Green ====
March 8	Saint Louis	6 – 1	Bowling Green	St. Louis Arena

=== Third place ===
==== (3) Bowling Green vs. Western Michigan ====
March 4	Bowling Green	11 – 4	Western Michigan	St. Louis Arena

=== Championship ===
==== (1) Lake Superior State vs. (2) Saint Louis ====
March 10	Lake Superior State	3 – 8	Saint Louis	St. Louis Arena

== Tournament awards ==
=== All-Tournament Team ===
- F John Nestic (Saint Louis)
- F Rich Nagai (Bowling Green)
- F Charlie Labelle (Saint Louis)
- D Mario Faubert (Saint Louis)
- D Tom Davies (Lake Superior State)
- G Carl Sapinsky (Saint Louis)
