= 1976 CCHA men's ice hockey tournament =

1976 CCHA Men's ice hockey tournament
- Dates: March 18–21, 1976
- Teams: 4
- Finals site: St. Louis Arena; St. Louis, Missouri
- Champions: Saint Louis (3rd title)
- Winning coach: Bill Selman (3rd title)
- CCHA Men's Ice Hockey Tournaments

The 1976 CCHA Men's Ice Hockey Tournament was the fifth CCHA Men's Ice Hockey Tournament. It was played between March 18 and March 21, 1976. All games were played at St. Louis Arena in St. Louis, Missouri, the home venue of the St. Louis Billikens.

== Format ==
The tournament featured two rounds of play. Only the top four teams in the conference standings were eligible for postseason play. In the semifinal the first and fourth seeds and the second and third seeds were matched as opponents in single game series with the winners advancing to the Championship. In the finals the teams played a 2 game series where the squad that score the most combined goals would be crowned champion.

== Conference standings ==
Note: GP = Games played; W = Wins; L = Losses; T = Ties; PTS = Points; GF = Goals For; GA = Goals Against

1975–76 Central Collegiate Hockey Association standings
	Conference							Overall					
	GP	W	L	T	PTS	GF	GA	GP	W	L	T	GF	GA
Bowling Green†	16	11	4	1	23	80	44	32	21	9	2	198	90
Saint Louis*	16	10	5	1	21	76	51	41	24	15	2	193	139
Lake Superior State	16	9	7	0	18	59	55	37	20	16	1	185	172
Western Michigan	16	6	10	0	12	62	75	34	18	14	2	176	158
Ohio State	16	3	13	0	6	49	101	34	18	15	1	213	155
Championship: Saint Louis † indicates conference regular season champion * indicates conference tournament champion

== Bracket ==
Semifinals; March 18
1	Bowling Green	2
4	Western Michigan	3*
2	Saint Louis	9
3	Lake Superior State	1

Championship; March 20–21
2	Saint Louis	2	13
4	Western Michigan	2	2

Note: * denotes overtime period(s)

=== Semifinals ===
==== (1) Bowling Green vs. (4) Western Michigan ====
March 18	Bowling Green	2 – 3	OT	Western Michigan	St. Louis Arena

==== (2) Saint Louis vs. (3) Lake Superior State ====
March 18	Saint Louis	9 – 1	Lake Superior State	St. Louis Arena

=== Championship ===
==== (2) Saint Louis vs. (4) Western Michigan ====
March 20	Saint Louis	2 – 2	Western Michigan	St. Louis Arena

March 21	Saint Louis	13 – 2	Western Michigan	St. Louis Arena

Saint Louis won series 15-4

== Tournament awards ==
=== MVP ===
- None
