= 1975 CCHA men's ice hockey tournament =

1975 CCHA Men's ice hockey tournament
- Dates: March 7–8, 1975
- Teams: 4
- Finals site: St. Louis Arena; St. Louis, Missouri
- Champions: Saint Louis (2nd title)
- Winning coach: Bill Selman (2nd title)
- CCHA Men's Ice Hockey Tournaments

The 1975 CCHA Men's Ice Hockey Tournament was the fourth CCHA Men's Ice Hockey Tournament. It was played between March 7 and March 8, 1975, at St. Louis Arena in St. Louis, Missouri. Saint Louis won the tournament, defeating Lake Superior State 8–3 in the championship game for the second consecutive year.

== Conference standings ==
Note: GP = Games played; W = Wins; L = Losses; T = Ties; PTS = Points; GF = Goals For; GA = Goals Against

1974–75 Central Collegiate Hockey Association standings
	Conference							Overall					
	GP	W	L	T	PTS	GF	GA	GP	W	L	T	GF	GA
Saint Louis†*	8	5	3	0	10	33	22	40	26	13	1	201	135
Bowling Green	8	4	3	1	9	35	30	35	23	10	2	200	124
Lake Superior State	8	2	5	1	5	27	43	32	17	14	1	177	144
Championship: Saint Louis † indicates conference regular season champion * indicates conference tournament champion

== Bracket ==
Semifinals; March 7, 1975
1	Saint Louis	5
–	Western Michigan	2
2	Bowling Green	4
3	Lake Superior State	6

Championship; March 8, 1975
1	Saint Louis	8
3	Lake Superior State	3

=== Semifinals ===
==== (1) Saint Louis vs. Western Michigan ====
March 7	Saint Louis	5 – 2	Western Michigan	St. Louis Arena

==== (2) Bowling Green vs. (3) Lake Superior State ====
March 7	Bowling Green	4 – 6	Lake Superior State	St. Louis Arena

=== Championship ===
==== (1) Saint Louis vs. (3) Lake Superior State ====
March 8	Saint Louis	8 – 3	Lake Superior State	St. Louis Arena

== Tournament awards ==
=== All-Tournament Team ===
- F Doug Lawton (Saint Louis)
- F Julio Francella (Lake Superior State)
- F Tim Dunlop (Western Michigan)
- D Kevin O'Rear (Saint Louis)
- D Roger Archer (Bowling Green)
- G Lindsay Middlebrook (Saint Louis)
