= Mario Faubert =

Canadian ice hockey player

- Born: December 2, 1954 (age 70) Valleyfield, Quebec, Canada
- Height: 6 ft 1 in (185 cm)
- Weight: 175 lb (79 kg; 12 st 7 lb)
- Position: Defence
- Shot: Right
- Played for: Pittsburgh Penguins (NHL)
- NHL draft: 62nd overall, 1974; Pittsburgh Penguins
- WHA draft: 138th overall, 1974; Vancouver Blazers
- Playing career: 1974–1982

Mario Faubert (born December 2, 1954) is a Canadian retired professional ice hockey defenceman and politician.

== Hockey career ==
Faubert played two seasons at Saint Louis University before being drafted by the Pittsburgh Penguins in the 1974 NHL amateur draft. His early career was split between the Penguins and the AHL's Hershey Bears. He played his first full season in 1981, and finished the year first among Pittsburgh defenceman in scoring. On November 18, 1981 Faubert suffered a tragic career ending leg injury in a game versus St. Louis.

== Political career ==
In February 2003, the Parti libéral du Québec announced that Mario Faubert would be its candidate in the riding of Beauharnois for the upcoming Quebec general election. He was named the liberal candidate after the Beauharnois-Huntingdon district was split in two and incumbent André Chenail chose to ride in Huntingdon. He got 42.77% of the vote but lost by 639 votes to Parti Québécois candidate Serge Deslières.

== Awards and honours ==
Award	Year
All-CCHA Second Team	1973-74
CCHA All-Tournament Team	1974

== Career statistics ==
			Regular Season					Playoffs
Season	Team	League	GP	G	A	Pts	PIM	GP	G	A	Pts	PIM
1972-73	St. Louis University	CCHA	38	3	36	39	68	—	—	—	—	—
1973-74	St. Louis University	CCHA	40	8	35	43	62	—	—	—	—	—
1974–75	Hershey Bears	AHL	54	13	21	34	76	11	2	7	9	4
1974–75	Pittsburgh Penguins	NHL	10	1	0	1	6	—	—	—	—	—
1975–76	Hershey Bears	AHL	39	7	16	23	37	10	4	6	10	14
1975–76	Pittsburgh Penguins	NHL	21	1	8	9	10	—	—	—	—	—
1976–77	Hershey Bears	AHL	32	8	19	27	42	—	—	—	—	—
1976–77	Pittsburgh Penguins	NHL	47	2	11	13	32	3	1	0	1	2
1977–78	Pittsburgh Penguins	NHL	18	0	6	6	11	—	—	—	—	—
1977–78	Binghamton Dusters	AHL	7	0	3	3	12	—	—	—	—	—
1978–79	Binghamton Dusters	AHL	73	7	33	40	50	10	3	7	10	6
1979–80	Pittsburgh Penguins	NHL	49	5	13	18	31	2	0	1	1	0
1980–81	Pittsburgh Penguins	NHL	72	8	44	52	118	5	1	1	2	4
1981–82	Pittsburgh Penguins	NHL	14	4	8	12	14	—	—	—	—	—
NHL totals			231	21	90	111	222	10	2	2	4	6
