= Ralph Romano =

Biographical details
- Born: August 25, 1934; Fort William, Ontario, Canada
- Died: December 16, 1983 (aged 49)

Playing career
- 1954–1956: Minnesota–Duluth
- Position: Goaltender

Coaching career (HC unless noted)
- 1959–1968: Minnesota–Duluth

Administrative career (AD unless noted)
- 1969–1983: Minnesota–Duluth

Head coaching record
- Overall: 90–121–7

Accomplishments and honors

Championships
- 1960 MIAC Champion; 1961 MIAC Champion

Awards
- 1989 Duluth–Superior Sports Hall of Fame; 1993 Minnesota–Duluth Athletic Hall of Fame

Ralph Romano (August 25, 1934 – December 16, 1983) was an ice hockey goaltender, head coach, and athletic director, all with the University of Minnesota–Duluth (UMD).

== Career ==
Ralph Romano spent his entire adult career with the UMD Bulldogs, playing for the team between 1954 and 1956. After graduating he was named as head coach in 1959 and shepherded the team while it transitioned from the MIAC (in what would become a Division III conference) to an upper-classification team and eventually join the dominant conference of the 1960s, the WCHA. Though his teams didn't win many games after it left the MIAC, Romano was well-regarded at the university and was promoted to athletic director in 1969. Romano remained at that position until he died from a heart attack while attending a game against Denver in December 1983. He was posthumously inducted into both the Duluth–Superior Sports Hall of Fame and the Minnesota–Duluth Athletic Hall of Fame.

== Head coaching record ==
Record table
Season	Team	Overall	Conference	Standing	Postseason
Minnesota–Duluth Bulldogs (MIAC) (1959–1961)
1959–60	Minnesota–Duluth	15–5–0	8–0–0	1st	
1960–61	Minnesota–Duluth	13–3–0	6–0–0	1st	
Minnesota–Duluth:		28–8–0	14–0–0		
Minnesota–Duluth Bulldogs Independent (1961–1965)
1961–62	Minnesota–Duluth	6–14–2			
1962–63	Minnesota–Duluth	7–15–2			
1963–64	Minnesota–Duluth	11–14–0			
1964–65	Minnesota–Duluth	14–12–1			
Minnesota–Duluth:		38–55–5			
Minnesota–Duluth Bulldogs (WCHA) (1965–1968)
1965–66	Minnesota–Duluth	7–19–2	3–15–2	8th	WCHA First Round
1966–67	Minnesota–Duluth	12–16–0	8–15–0	6th	WCHA First Round
1967–68	Minnesota–Duluth	5–23–0	4–20–0	8th	WCHA First Round
Minnesota–Duluth:		24–58–2	15–50–2		
Total:		90–121–7			
National champion Postseason invitational champion Conference regular season champion Conference regular season and conference tournament champion Division regular season champion Division regular season and conference tournament champion Conference tournament champion
