= Saint Louis Billikens men's ice hockey =

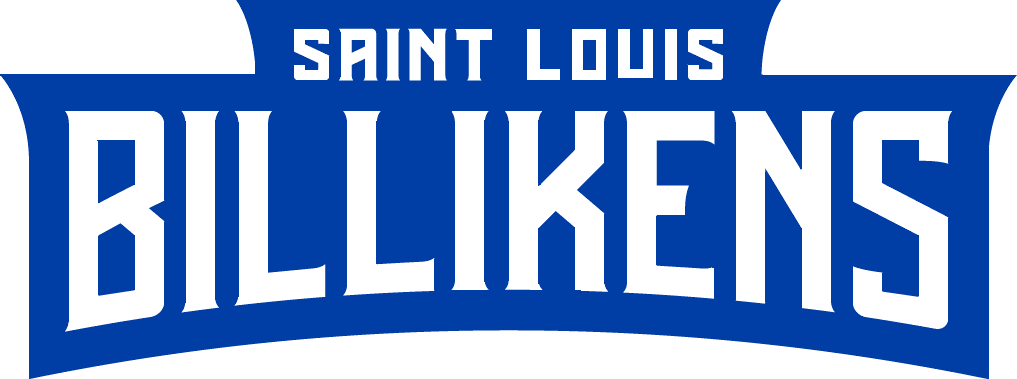
- University: Saint Louis University
- Conference: MACHA
- Head coach: Liam Knobbe
- Arena: Webster Groves Ice Rink; Saint Louis, Missouri
- Colors: SLU blue and white

Conference tournament champions
- CCHA: 1974, 1975, 1976

Conference regular season champions
- CCHA: 1973, 1975, 1977

The Saint Louis Billikens men's ice hockey is an ACHA Division III ice hockey team that plays in the Silver Division (D-III) of the Mid-American Collegiate Hockey Association. They are coached by Head Coach Liam Knobbe and Assistant Coaches Dylan Kelly, Chaz Palumbo, and Nolan Meyer. The Billikens previously played in NCAA Division I from 1970 to 1979.

== History ==
=== Division I ===
Saint Louis University began sponsoring ice hockey as a Division I sport in 1970, partly to capitalize on the new NHL team, the St. Louis Blues, that had begun playing only three years earlier. The Billikens were able to reach an agreement with Blues owner Sid Salomon Jr. to play their home games at the newly renovated St. Louis Arena, giving Saint Louis by far the largest home venue in the college ranks. Additionally the Billikens were able to secure the services of Bill Selman as head coach. Selman had spent the preceding six years behind the bench for Minnesota–Duluth and North Dakota, helping the Fighting Sioux to back-to-back appearances in the NCAA Tournament in the mid-1960s. The biggest problem Saint Louis faced was finding a conference to compete in. At the time of their start there were effectively only two conferences at the Division-I level, one for eastern teams (ECAC) and one for western teams (WCHA). Because Saint Louis was considered a western team (as were all teams not playing on the eastern seaboard) the Billikens were forced to play as an independent for their first season.

In 1971 Saint Louis, Bowling Green and Lake Superior State agreed to form a conference of their own called the Central Collegiate Hockey Association (CCHA). the Billikens and Falcons began play straight away with the Lakers set to join the following year. The three teams also invited Ohio State and Ohio into the conference. Saint Louis began well, finishing as runners-up in both the regular season and conference tournaments for the first year of league play. Saint Louis also served as the host for the CCHA tournament for the first six years of its existence.

The Billikens began to hit their stride in 1972–73 when they won their first conference regular season title, winning the CCHA by 8 points and ending the year with a 27-win season (the best record in the history of the program). Unfortunately a 5–6 overtime loss to Bowling Green in the round-robin tournament meant they finished in second place once more. Spurred on by consecutive near-missed the Billikens won three straight CCHA tournaments in the mid-1970s and two additional regular season titles, placing them firmly atop the conference. Not everything was going well, however. Ohio and Ohio State had left the CCHA after only two seasons and, despite the addition of Lake Superior State, the CCHA was on life-support as a 3-team conference during that period. For both 1974 and 1975 Western Michigan had to be invited to fill out a 4-team bracket which only served to make few take notice of the Billiken's achievements.

By 1975 Ohio State had rejoined the CCHA, however, and the conference seemed to be surviving. The next year the NCAA announced that it was granting the selection committee the ability to add up to 4 additional team to the tournament as it saw fit with the express purpose of allowing the CCHA to send a representative. Saint Louis, coming off three consecutive titles, won the 1976–77 regular season crown but fell to Bowling Green 4–5 on aggregate. The program was dealt a mortal blow that offseason when the St. Louis Blues were sold to Ralston Purina and the deal to use the Arena had to be reworked. The new arrangement was far more expensive for the university and when a budget crunch in 1978 forced the school to decide between keeping its ice hockey or basketball programs the board of governors allowed the axe to fall on the hockey team. Despite knowing the fate of the program Bill Selman remained with the Billikens for their final season in 1978–79 before it returned to club status.

=== ACHA ===
Since 1996 the Saint Louis Billikens have competed in the ACHA, playing in a variety of conferences.

== Season-by-season records ==
| Season | Conference | Record | Pct. | Position | Conference Tournament | Coach |
|---|---|---|---|---|---|---|
| 1970–71 | Independent | 9–19–2 | .333 | — | — | Bill Selman |
| 1971–72 | CCHA | 15–15–3 | .500 | 2nd | 2nd | Bill Selman |
| 1972–73 | CCHA | 27–11–0 | .711 | 1st | 2nd | Bill Selman |
| 1973–74 | CCHA | 28–12–0 | .700 | 2nd | 1st | Bill Selman |
| 1974–75 | CCHA | 26–13–1 | .663 | 1st | 1st | Bill Selman |
| 1975–76 | CCHA | 24–15–2 | .610 | 2nd | 1st | Bill Selman |
| 1976–77 | CCHA | 27–11–1 | .705 | 1st | 2nd | Bill Selman |
| 1977–78 | CCHA | 21–17–2 | .550 | 2nd | 2nd | Bill Selman |
| 1978–79 | CCHA | 16–16–3 | .500 | 5th | — | Bill Selman |
| 9 Seasons | — | 193–129–14 | .595 | — | — | 1 coach |

== All-time coaching records ==
| Tenure | Coach | Years | Record | Pct. |
|---|---|---|---|---|
| 1970–1979 | Bill Selman | 9 | 193–129–14 | .595 |
| Totals | 1 coaches | 9 seasons | 193–129–14 | .595 |

== Billikens in the NHL ==
| Player | Position | Team(s) | Years | Games | Stanley Cups |
|---|---|---|---|---|---|
| Mario Faubert | Defenseman | PIT | 1974–1982 | 231 | 0 |
| Lindsay Middlebrook | Goaltender | WPG, MNS, NJD, EDM | 1979–1983 | 37 | 0 |
| Bob Sykes | Left wing | TOR | 1974–1975 | 2 | 0 |
| Chris Valentine | Forward | WSH | 1981–1984 | 105 | 0 |
