= CCHA men's ice hockey tournament =

US collegiate ice hockey tournament

CCHA Tournament
- Conference hockey championship
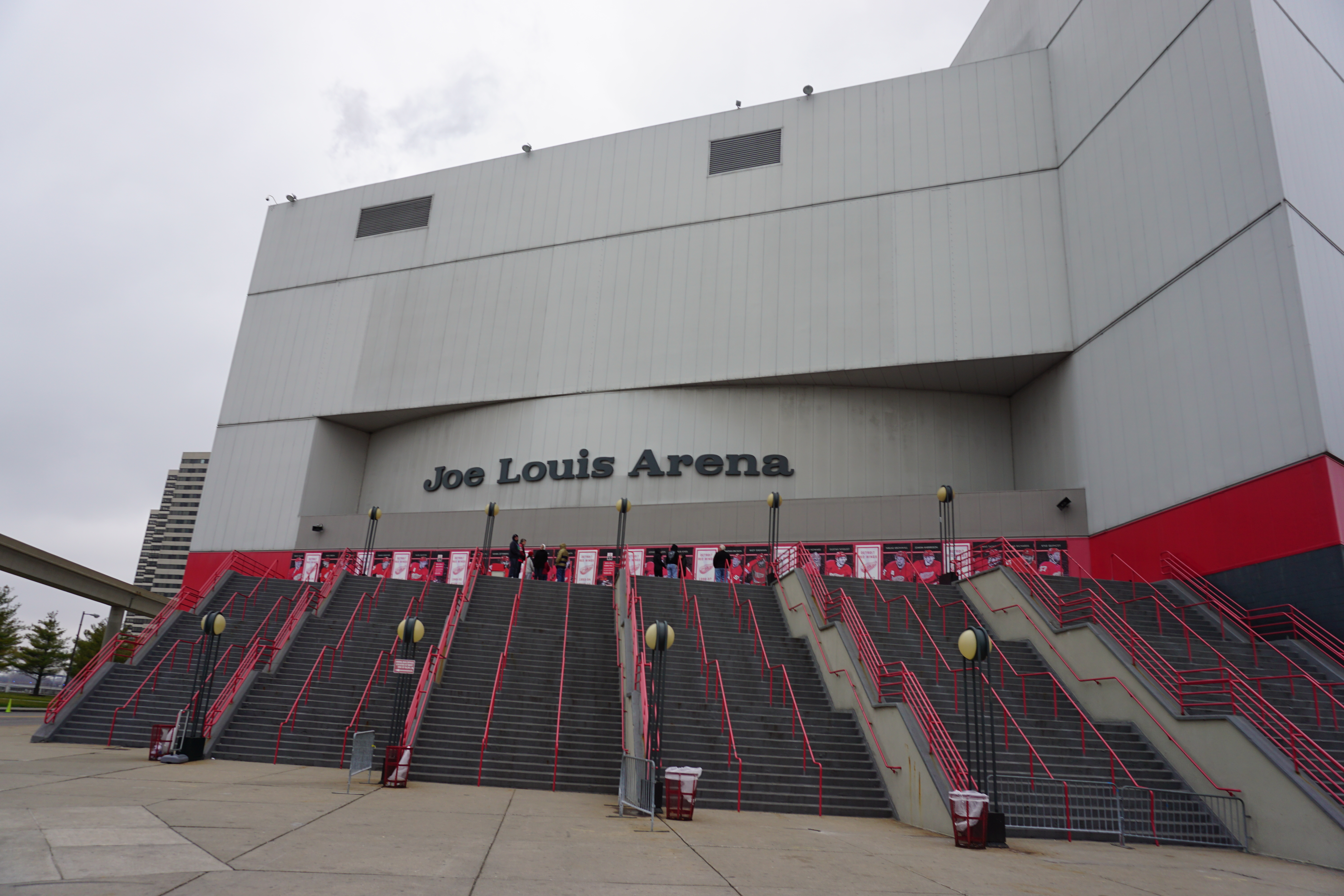
- Joe Louis Arena in Detroit, Michigan hosted the championship game of the CCHA tournament almost every season in the original CCHA.
- Sport: College ice hockey
- Conference: Central Collegiate Hockey Association
- Number of teams: 8
- Format: Single-elimination; best two-of-three first round, single-game semifinals and final
- Current stadium: Campus sites
- Played: 1972–2013, 2022–present
- Last contest: 2025 CCHA Tournament
- Current champion: Minnesota State Mavericks (third win)
- Most championships: Michigan State Spartans (eleven wins)
- Winner trophy: Mason Cup
- TV partner: Midco Sports Plus
- Official website: ccha.com

The CCHA Tournament is the conference tournament for the Central Collegiate Hockey Association (CCHA), an NCAA Division I men's ice hockey conference that originally operated from 1971 to 2013 and has been revived effective in 2021. The winner of the tournament receives an automatic berth into the NCAA Tournament. The winner of the tournament also receives the Mason Cup, which was first presented in 2001. In other years, the trophy was known as the CCHA Tournament Championship Trophy.

== History ==
The tournament was first held in 1972, the first year of conference play. It was held at The Arena in St. Louis, Missouri, from 1972 to 1977. From 1978 to 1981, the CCHA Tournament was held at the rink of the higher seed.

In 1981–82, four teams from the WCHA, Michigan, Michigan State, Michigan Tech and Notre Dame, defected to the CCHA. The four teams brought their long, storied histories with 12 combined NCAA National Championships giving the young, up-start league instant credibility. The tournament semifinals and championship were moved from small on-campus rinks to Joe Louis Arena, then-home of the NHL's Detroit Red Wings. Commissioner Bill Beagan coined the phrase "Road to the Joe" in describing the CCHA Tournament in 1985–86. The phrase was commonly used in reference to the CCHA Tournament while it was being played at Joe Louis Arena.

With the tournament expanding to 12 teams in 2001–02, the CCHA adopted the name "Super Six" in reference to the six teams who advance past the first round to the CCHA championships at Joe Louis Arena. The name was dropped following the 2005 season when the CCHA championships were reduced back to four teams. The CCHA, and thus the CCHA tournament, would be discontinued following the 2013 season, due to a large conference re-alignment following the Big Ten's sponsorship of ice hockey.

In February 2020, seven schools that had announced they would leave the Western Collegiate Hockey Association after the 2020–21 season announced that they would form a new CCHA, with the 2021–22 season as the first for the revived league. The tournament resumed in 2022 with the Mason Cup once again being awarded to the tournament champion. Minnesota State would win the 2022 tournament, the first CCHA tournament in nearly a decade.

== Championship Round Performance ==
Game records may not add up to the amount of championship round appearances due to the championship round being two games in certain years.

=== By school ===
School	Championships	Appearances	Record	Pct
Michigan State	11	15	11–4	.733
Michigan	9	17	9–8	.529
Bowling Green	5	8	8–3	.727
Lake Superior State	4	12	4–8	.333
St. Louis	3	7	4–5–1	.450
Western Michigan	3	5	2–3–1	.417
Notre Dame	3	4	3–1	.750
Minnesota State	3	3	3–0	1.000
Ohio State	2	7	2–6–1	.278
Northern Michigan	2	5	3–3–1	.500
Miami	1	3	1–3	.250
Michigan Tech	1	1	1–0	1.000
Ferris State	0	2	0–3	.000
Bemidji State	0	2	0–2	.000
St. Thomas	0	1	0–1	.000
Omaha	0	1	0–1	.000

=== By coach ===
App.	Coach	Record	Pct
17	Ron Mason	15–5	.750
17	Red Berenson	9–8	.529
9	Jeff Jackson	7–2	.778
7	Bill Selman	5–5–1	.500
6	Rick Comley	4–3–1	.563
4	Rico Blasi	1–3	.250
4	Frank Anzalone	0–4	.000
3	John Markell	1–2	.333
3	Jerry York	1–2	.333
2	Jack Vivian	3–0	1.000
2	Mike Hastings	2–0	1.000
2	Bill Wilkinson	1–1	.500
2	Jerry Welsh	0–3–1	.125
2	Tom Serratore	0–2	.000
1	Dave Chambers	1–0	1.000
1	Andy Murray	1–0	1.000
1	Joe Shawhan	1–0	1.000
1	Luke Strand	1–0	1.000
1	Bill Neal	0–1–1	.250
1	Jeff Blashill	0–1	.000
1	Bob Daniels	0–1	.000
1	George Gwozdecky	0–1	.000
1	Mike Kemp	0–1	.000
1	Walt Kyle	0–1	.000
1	Grant Potulny	0–1	.000
1	Lefty Smith	0–1	.000
1	Rick Duffett	0–2	.000
1	Gerald Walford	0–2	.000

== Formats and Changes ==
1972

The CCHA Tournament format begins as a single-game elimination two-round format.

1973

A round-robin championship format was adopted. Although not a member of the CCHA's Division I, Western Michigan is invited as the fourth team in the CCHA Tournament.

1974–75

The single-game elimination format returns. Western Michigan is invited for a second year as the fourth team in the CCHA Tournament.

1976

Championship game is changed to a two-game, total-goals series.

1977–81

All tournament rounds are changed to a two-game, total-goals series.

1982–85

First round series remain a two-game, total-goals series. Semifinals and finals are changed to single-game elimination format. The CCHA Tournament is expanded from four teams to eight teams in a three-round format.

1986

First round series changed to a best two-of-three format. Semifinals and finals remain single-game elimination.

1993–94

With the addition of Kent State and Notre Dame to the league and Alaska as an affiliate member, the tournament expanded to 12 teams. A quarterfinal at Joe Louis Arena narrows the field from six to four. Alaska is placed in the tournament by team choice. In order, the top six teams select their opponent for the first round among the bottom five teams and Alaska. The CCHA eliminates the consolation game.

1995

The tournament retracts to 10 teams. A highest seed-hosts, midweek play-in game narrows the field from five to four.

1996–99

Tournament format returns to eight teams.

2000–01

The tournament field expands back to 10 along with the midweek play-in game.

2002–05

All 12 teams qualify for the tournament with a quarterfinal at Joe Louis Arena narrowing the field from six to four. The consolation game returns to boost records and rankings for NCAA Tournament selection.

2006–13

All 11 league members qualified for the tournament. A four-round format was introduced beginning in 2006 with the top five seeds receiving byes and the remaining six teams playing in an on-campus best two-of-three first round series. After the first round, the field was reseeded for the quarterfinal round for an on-campus best two-of-three series. The remaining four teams were reseeded for the CCHA Championship at Joe Louis Arena in Detroit.

2022–present

The revived CCHA tournament involves the top eight conference members seeded according to regular-season conference records. The top four teams host best-of-three series in the opening round, matched in the standard format of 1–8, 2–7, 3–6, and 4–5. The semifinals consist of single games hosted by the top two surviving seeds. The final is also a single game, hosted by the top remaining seed.
