= 1991–92 Lake Superior State Lakers men's ice hockey season =

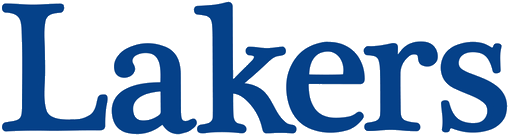

National champion CCHA tournament, champion NCAA tournament, champion
- Conference: 2nd CCHA
- Home ice: Norris Center

Record
- Overall: 30–9–4
- Conference: 20–8–4
- Home: 18–1–1
- Road: 6–8–3
- Neutral: 6–0–0

Coaches and captains
- Head coach: Jeff Jackson
- Assistant coaches: Doug Laprade; Ron Rolston; Joe Shawhan
- Captain(s): Mark Astley; Sandy Moger; Mike Bachusz

The 1991–92 Lake Superior State Lakers men's ice hockey team represented the Lake Superior State University in college ice hockey. In its 2nd year under head coach Jeff Jackson the team compiled a 30–9–4 record and reached the NCAA tournament for the sixth time. The Lakers defeated Wisconsin 5–3 to win the championship game at the Knickerbocker Arena in Albany, New York.

== Season ==
After two consecutive 30+ win seasons Lake Superior was expected to take a step back. Losing its top five scorers from 1990–91, the formerly high-scoring Lakers would need to find a sway to get over the postseason hump that had seem them bow out in the national quarterfinals two years in a row. Stepping into the breach was freshman Brian Rolston, the 11th overall pick in the 1991 NHL entry draft and probably the most heralded prospect ever to appear in a Laker uniform. Also returning was the nations' top goaltender from the previous season, Darrin Madeley.

=== Good start ===
In their first five games Lake Superior looked to be just as impressive as they had been over the past two seasons, winning each game by an average of five goals. In those games, however, they weren't playing good teams. When the team took on defending national champion Northern Michigan in early November they earned a split in the home-and-home series. While they did acquit themselves well, losing the road game was the start of a pattern that would continue throughout the entire season.

The next weekend, at perennial power Michigan State, Madeley demonstrated that he was going to have another strong season by limiting the Spartans to a single goal in each game but LSSU could only manage a split after being shut out in the first game. Even when facing lowly Illinois–Chicago on the road, Lake Superior could only keep the weekends even. While their defensive game was strong, None of their players were particularly strong on offense; no Laker finished the season in the top 40 in scoring and the best points per game for Lake State was Sandy Moger's 1.21 ppg, good for 88th in the country.

=== Home dominance ===
While the Lakers struggled to win on the road they were absolutely deadly at home. When eventual CCHA champion Michigan came to town in early December the Lakers earned a sweep in the series but did so with a 10–0 demolition of the Wolverines. Unfortunately, Lake Superior immediately surrendered that advantage with only 1 point against Miami the week after. Lake Superior was able to balance out their adequate road swings with stifling defense at home; only twice did the Lakers give up more than three goals at the Norris Center but timely offense allowed them to win both games.

The only blemish on their otherwise impeccable home record came from Michigan State. The Spartans took three points from LSSU in early February, the only two games in Sault Ste. Marie that the Lakers did not win. That poor home series also could not have come at a worse time; having lost both games at Michigan the week before Lake State was in a dogfight with their southern rivals for the top spot in the CCHA. With all three teams separated by just 3 points, the conference would be determined by how the final month of the season played out.

=== Down to the wire ===
While Lake Superior and Michigan swept their respective weekends in mid-February, Michigan State could only manage a single point against lowly Bowling Green. The Lakers then earned a much-needed 3 points on the road against Western Michigan while the Wolverines all but ended the Spartans hopes with a sweep at the Joe Louis Arena. Michigan was now ahead of Lake State by 1 point with four games to play. With their next series against bottom-feeding Ohio State the Lakers had hopes that they could end their road woes but instead the team produced its worst defense efforts of the season, surrendering 15 goals in the two games and dropping five points behind the Wolverines, guaranteeing Michigan the CCHA championship. MSU, meanwhile, had recovered after their debacle at 'The Joe' and crept up into a tie with Lake State for second place. Not wanting to drop even further back, Lake Superior showed their mettle by taking both games against Western Michigan to finish one point ahead of the Spartans (who held the tie breaker) and lock up the second seed in the CCHA tournament.

=== CCHA tournament ===
In their final home games of the year, Lake Superior easily defeated Illinois–Chicago in the conference quarterfinals, winning twice before heading to Detroit. The semifinals saw them pitted against the Spartans but again, MSU failed in the Red Wings' building and the Lakers won the game 5–3. Michigan met them in the finals and were looking to avenge the championship loss from 1991. Tournament MVP Darrin Madeley stole the show, holding the conference's top offensive team to a single goal en route to the Laker's championship.

=== NCAA tournament ===
While the CCHA crown guaranteed Lake Superior a spot in the NCAA tournament, it was not enough to earn them a bye into the quarterfinals. Lake Superior was given the third western seed, which would have allowed them to play at home in years past, but the NCAA tournament format had been changed for 1992. The first two rounds were now single-game elimination, like the championship rounds. With that came the ability create regional brackets with a single venue used as host. All games played by teams in the western regional were held at the Joe Louis Arena, a distinct advantage for CCHA teams. Lake Superior used that advantage and trounced Alaska–Anchorage in the quarterfinal. Two nights later they took on Minnesota, the team that led the nation in wins, and again dominated the competition with an 8–3 victory.

Showing just how strong they were that year, Michigan, Michigan State and Lake Superior State all made the Frozen Four, the most the CCHA has ever produced. At least one of those teams would make the finals when MSU took on Lake State. The two squads battled to a 2–2 tie after two periods before Mark Astley scored the game winner midway through the third. LSSU's defense held the Spartans to six shots in the final frame and gave the Lakers their second championship appearance.

==== Controversial finish ====
With only a surprising Wisconsin team standing in their way, the Lakers started the game well but soon found themselves down a goal. Wisconsin added a power play marker before the end of the first and Lake Superior, who had had trouble scoring at times during the season, were hoping that the game wasn't already out of hand. Rather than the game being remembered for performances by players, however, referee Tim McConaghy called an inordinate amount of penalties in the game. Many in attendance had difficulty in understanding the calls and things went from bad to worse when the Badgers' captain Doug MacDonald was given a 10-minute misconduct for questioning the calls. While the Lakers were hit for 10 penalties in the game, Wisconsin players headed to the box 15 times and Lake Superior managed to use the disproportionate advantages to even the game after 40 minutes.

Michael Smith scored early in the third to give the Lakers their first lead of the game but a power play goal by Jason Zent tied the game at 3-all. Just after the fifteen-minute mark Brian Rolston scored to put Lake State up 4–3 and Wisconsin began a furious attempt to come back. With three minutes to play Blaine Moore was charged with elbowing to the obvious frustration of the Badgers. Wisconsin was forced to pull their goaltender but an empty-net goal by Jay Ness salted away the game and gave Lake Superior their second national championship.

The Lakers had outshot Wisconsin 37–27 in the game while both teams scored twice on the power play, but the enduring legacy from the match was a confrontation between McConaghy and Wisconsin team members after the game. The ugly incident would eventually lead to three separate suspensions, a sour finish for what should have been a Lake Superior triumph.

To make matters worse, Wisconsin's participation was later vacated for unrelated violations by team members leaving the 1992 championship one of the most mired in controversy in NCAA history.

=== Awards and honors ===
Regardless of Wisconsin's response, Paul Constantin, who had started the laker's comeback in the second period, was named the tournament MOP and joined Darrin Madeley, Mark Astley and Brian Rolston on the All-Tournament team. For the second year in a row Madeley possessed the best goals against average in the nation, posting the best numbers for any qualifying goalie in seven years. His stellar play earn him an AHCA First-Team All-American spot along with Astley.

Both Madeley and Astley were on the All-CCHA First Team while Steve Barnes and Sandy Moger made the second team. Astley was also named as the Best Offensive Defenseman in the CCHA.

== Standings ==
1991–92 Central Collegiate Hockey Association standings
	Conference							Overall					
	GP	W	L	T	PTS	GF	GA	GP	W	L	T	GF	GA
Michigan†	32	22	7	3	47	150	104	44	32	9	3	215	144
Lake Superior State*	32	20	8	4	44	141	78	43	30	9	4	203	100
Michigan State	32	18	7	7	43	149	105	44	26	10	8	199	143
Western Michigan	32	14	12	6	34	119	114	36	16	14	6	140	130
Miami	32	12	14	6	30	124	145	40	18	16	6	165	183
Ferris State	32	11	15	6	28	102	127	38	13	18	7	119	148
Illinois-Chicago	32	8	18	6	22	101	132	36	10	20	6	123	152
Ohio State	32	8	19	5	21	134	182	38	12	21	5	162	211
Bowling Green	32	7	20	5	19	123	156	34	8	21	5	133	165
Championship: Lake Superior State † indicates conference regular season champion * indicates conference tournament champion

== Schedule ==
Date	Opponent^{#}	Rank^{#}	Site	Result	Record	
Regular Season
October 18	vs. Laurentian*		Norris Center • Sault Ste. Marie, Michigan	W 9–2	1–0	
October 25	at Ferris State		Ewigleben Arena • Big Rapids, Michigan	W 6–1	2–0 (1–0)	
October 26	at Ferris State		Ewigleben Arena • Big Rapids, Michigan	W 3–2 ^{OT}	3–0 (2–0)	
November 1	vs. Bowling Green		Norris Center • Sault Ste. Marie, Michigan	W 8–1	4–0 (3–0)	
November 2	vs. Bowling Green		Norris Center • Sault Ste. Marie, Michigan	W 8–3	5–0 (4–0)	
November 7	at Northern Michigan*		Lakeview Arena • Marquette, Michigan	L 1–4	5–1 (4–0)	
November 9	vs. Northern Michigan*		Norris Center • Sault Ste. Marie, Michigan	W 8–1	6–1 (4–0)	
November 15	at Michigan State		Munn Ice Arena • East Lansing, Michigan	L 0–1	6–2 (4–1)	
November 16	at Michigan State		Munn Ice Arena • East Lansing, Michigan	W 3–1	7–2 (5–1)	
November 22	vs. Miami		Norris Center • Sault Ste. Marie, Michigan	W 5–1	8–2 (6–1)	
November 23	vs. Miami		Norris Center • Sault Ste. Marie, Michigan	W 8–5	9–2 (7–1)	
November 29	at Illinois–Chicago*		UIC Pavilion • Chicago, Illinois	W 5–2	10–2 (8–1)	
November 30	at Illinois–Chicago*		UIC Pavilion • Chicago, Illinois	L 1–3	10–3 (8–2)	
December 6	vs. Michigan		Norris Center • Sault Ste. Marie, Michigan	W 3–2 ^{OT}	11–3 (9–2)	
December 7	vs. Michigan		Norris Center • Sault Ste. Marie, Michigan	W 10–0	12–3 (10–2)	
December 13	at Miami		Goggin Ice Arena • Oxford, Ohio	L 1–4	12–4 (10–3)	
December 14	at Miami		Goggin Ice Arena • Oxford, Ohio	T 2–2 ^{OT}	12–4–1 (10–3–1)	
January 3	vs. Ohio State		Norris Center • Sault Ste. Marie, Michigan	W 9–1	13–4–1 (11–3–1)	
January 4	vs. Ohio State		Norris Center • Sault Ste. Marie, Michigan	W 6–0	14–4–1 (12–3–1)	
January 10	at Bowling Green		BGSU Ice Arena • Bowling Green, Ohio	W 4–3	15–4–1 (13–3–1)	
January 11	at Bowling Green		BGSU Ice Arena • Bowling Green, Ohio	T 6–6 ^{OT}	15–4–2 (13–3–2)	
January 24	vs. Illinois–Chicago		Norris Center • Sault Ste. Marie, Michigan	W 5–0	16–4–2 (14–3–2)	
January 25	vs. Illinois–Chicago		Norris Center • Sault Ste. Marie, Michigan	W 7–5	17–4–2 (15–3–2)	
January 31	at Michigan		Yost Ice Arena • Ann Arbor, Michigan	L 3–4	17–5–2 (15–4–2)	
February 1	at Michigan		Yost Ice Arena • Ann Arbor, Michigan	L 0–1	17–6–2 (15–5–2)	
February 7	vs. Michigan State		Norris Center • Sault Ste. Marie, Michigan	T 3–3 ^{OT}	17–6–3 (15–5–3)	
February 8	vs. Michigan State		Norris Center • Sault Ste. Marie, Michigan	L 1–4	17–7–3 (15–6–3)	
February 14	vs. Ferris State		Norris Center • Sault Ste. Marie, Michigan	W 8–2	18–7–3 (16–6–3)	
February 15	vs. Ferris State		Norris Center • Sault Ste. Marie, Michigan	W 5–1	19–7–3 (17–6–3)	
February 21	at Western Michigan		Lawson Arena • Kalamazoo, Michigan	W 5–1	20–7–3 (18–6–3)	
February 22	at Western Michigan		Lawson Arena • Kalamazoo, Michigan	T 1–1 ^{OT}	20–7–4 (18–6–4)	
February 28	at Ohio State		OSU Ice Rink • Columbus, Ohio	L 4–7	20–8–4 (18–7–4)	
February 29	at Ohio State		OSU Ice Rink • Columbus, Ohio	L 2–8	20–9–4 (18–8–4)	
March 6	vs. Western Michigan		Norris Center • Sault Ste. Marie, Michigan	W 6–1	21–9–4 (19–8–4)	
March 7	vs. Western Michigan		Norris Center • Sault Ste. Marie, Michigan	W 3–2	22–9–4 (20–8–4)	
CCHA tournament
March 13	vs. Illinois–Chicago*		Norris Center • Sault Ste. Marie, Michigan (CCHA Quarterfinal game 1)	W 3–1	23–9–4 (20–8–4)	
March 14	vs. Illinois–Chicago*		Norris Center • Sault Ste. Marie, Michigan (CCHA Quarterfinal game 2)	W 9–2	24–9–4 (20–8–4)	
Lake Superior State Won Series 2-0
March 21	vs. Michigan State*		Joe Louis Arena • Detroit, Michigan (CCHA Semifinal)	W 5–3	25–9–4 (20–8–4)	
March 22	vs. Michigan*		Joe Louis Arena • Detroit, Michigan (CCHA championship)	W 3–1	26–9–4 (20–8–4)	
NCAA tournament
March 27	vs. Alaska–Anchorage*		Joe Louis Arena • Detroit, Michigan (West Regional Quarterfinal)	W 7–3	27–9–4 (20–8–4)	
March 29	vs. Minnesota*		Joe Louis Arena • Detroit, Michigan (West Regional semifinal)	W 8–3	28–9–4 (20–8–4)	
April 2	vs. Michigan State*		Knickerbocker Arena • Albany, New York (National semifinal)	W 4–2	29–9–4 (20–8–4)	
April 4	vs. Wisconsin*		Knickerbocker Arena • Albany, New York (National championship)	W 5–3	12,891	30–9–4 (20–8–4)
*Non-conference game. ^{#}Rankings from USCHO.com Poll. Source:

== Roster and scoring statistics ==
No.	Name	Year	Position	Hometown	S/P/C	Games	Goals	Assists	Pts	PIM
12	Paul Constantin	Senior	LW	Burlington, ON	(Ontario)	43	21	31	52	48
23	Sandy Moger	Senior	RW	100 Mile House, BC	(British Columbia)	42	26	25	51	111
7	Mark Astley	Senior	D	Calgary, AB	(Alberta)	43	12	37	49	65
20	Vincent Faucher	Senior	LW	Dorion, PQ	(Quebec)	42	23	25	48	88
11	Brian Rolston	Freshman	C	Flint, MI	(Michigan)	41	18	28	46	16
14	Clayton Beddoes	Sophomore	C	Bentley, AB	(Alberta)	38	14	26	40	24
3	Steve Barnes	Sophomore	D	Gravenhurst, ON	(Ontario)	43	3	28	31	37
9	Wayne Strachan	Freshman	RW	Fort Frances, ON	(Ontario)	42	12	18	30	35
19	John Hendry	Junior	LW	Mississauga, ON	(Ontario)	43	13	13	26	59
25	Dean Hulett	Junior	RW	San Juan, PR	(Puerto Rico)	37	10	15	25	66
5	Michael Smith	Junior	D	Winnipeg, MB	(Manitoba)	43	8	17	25	34
15	Jay Ness	Sophomore	C	Grand Forks, ND	(North Dakota)	42	9	10	19	20
8	Mike Morin	Freshman	F	Melville, SK	(Saskatchewan)	37	10	5	15	26
21	Kurt Miller	Sophomore	LW	Bemidji, MN	(Minnesota)	15	6	7	13	32
16	Rob Valicevic	Freshman	RW	Detroit, MI	(Michigan)	36	8	4	12	12
2	Tim Hanley	Freshman	D	Terrace Bay, ON	(Ontario)	38	3	8	11	14
26	Mike Bachusz	Junior	D	Waterford, MI	(Michigan)	37	2	5	7	12
22	Jim Peters	Sophomore	D	Barrie, ON	(Ontario)	34	2	4	6	55
6	Darren Wetherill	Sophomore	D	Regina, SK	(Saskatchewan)	31	1	5	6	52
30	Darrin Madeley	Junior	G	Holland Landing, ON	(Ontario)	38	0	4	4	4
24	Dan Angelelli	Freshman	RW	Roseville, MN	(Minnesota)	23	0	3	3	34
10	Jason Welch	Freshman	C	Sault Ste. Marie, MI	(Michigan)	2	0	1	1	4
35	Blaine Lacher	Sophomore	G	Medicine Hat, AB	(Alberta)	10	0	1	1	0
1	Brian Lukowski	Junior	G	Buffalo, NY	(New York (state))	1	0	0	0	0
13	Brad Willner	Freshman	D	Edina, MN	(Minnesota)	16	0	0	0	8
Total										

== Goaltending statistics ==
No.	Name	Games	Minutes	Wins	Losses	Ties	Goals Against	Saves	Shut Outs	SV %	GAA
30	Darrin Madeley	38	2144	25	6	4	64	816	2	.917	2.07
35	Blaine Lacher	10	410	5	3	0	22	–	1	-	3.22
1	Brian Lukowski	1	30	0	0	0	2	–	0	–	4.00
Total		43	–	30	9	4	100	–	3	–	–

== 1992 national championship ==
=== (W3) Lake Superior State vs. (E6) Wisconsin ===
April 4	Lake Superior State	5 – 3	Wisconsin	Knickerbocker Arena

Scoring summary
Period	Team	Goal	Assist(s)	Time	Score
1st	WIS	Jason Zent			1–0 WIS
1st	WIS	Jason Zent – PP			2–0 WIS
2nd	LSSU	Paul Constantin – PP			2–1 WIS
2nd	LSSU	Tim Hanley		39:54	2–2
3rd	LSSU	Michael Smith		44:16	3–2 LSSU
3rd	WIS	Jason Zent – PP			3–3
3rd	LSSU	Brian Rolston – GW		55:08	4–3 LSSU
3rd	LSSU	Jay Ness – PP EN		59:58	5–3 LSSU

Goaltenders
Team	Name	Saves	Goals against	Time on ice
WIS	Duane Derksen		4	
LSSU	Darrin Madeley	24	3	

== Players drafted into the NHL ==
=== 1992 NHL entry draft ===
No Lakers were selected in the 1992 NHL Draft.

== See also ==
- 1992 NCAA Division I men's ice hockey tournament
- List of NCAA Division I men's ice hockey tournament champions
