= 1992 NCAA Division I men's ice hockey tournament =

- Teams: 12
- Finals site: Knickerbocker Arena, Albany, New York
- Champions: Lake Superior State Lakers (2nd title)
- Runner-up: none (Wisconsin Badgers vacated) (- title game)
- Semifinalists: Michigan State Spartans (8th Frozen Four); Michigan Wolverines (14th Frozen Four)
- Winning coach: Jeff Jackson (1st title)
- MOP: Paul Constantin (Lake Superior State)
- Attendance: 67,363

The 1992 NCAA Division I men's ice hockey tournament involved 12 schools competing to determine the national champion of men's NCAA Division I college ice hockey. Beginning with the 1992 tournament the format was changed to single-elimination play for all rounds of the tournament. First and quarterfinal rounds were played at two predetermined sites as the East and West Regionals. The tournament began on March 26, 1992, and ended with the championship game on April 4 in which Lake Superior State defeated the University of Wisconsin 5-3. A total of 11 games were played. Wisconsin's participation in the tournament was later vacated by the NCAA Committee on Infractions.

Alaska-Anchorage's 1992 participation was the last time an independent team was selected to the tournament, until Arizona State in 2019.

The 1992 championship game is most remembered for the controversial penalty calls that gave Lake Superior State 11 power plays in the game. Wisconsin staff and players were so incensed at the calls that referee Tim McConaghy was accosted after the match which led to two Wisconsin players being suspended for the Badgers' next NCAA Tournament game while assistant coach Bill Zito was barred from any affiliation with Wisconsin for the program's next two NCAA appearances.

As of 2026, this is the most recent tournament where there were no games that went to overtime.

== Qualifying teams ==
The at-large bids and seeding for each team in the tournament were announced after the conference tournaments concluded. The Central Collegiate Hockey Association (CCHA), Hockey East and Western Collegiate Hockey Association (WCHA) all had three teams receive a berth in the tournament, the ECAC had two berths, and there was one independent Division I bid.

| East Regional – Providence | | | | | | | West Regional – Detroit | | | | | | |
| Seed | School | Conference | Record | Berth type | Appearance | Last bid | Seed | School | Conference | Record | Berth type | Appearance | Last bid |
|---|---|---|---|---|---|---|---|---|---|---|---|---|---|
| 1 | Maine | Hockey East | 31–3–2* | Tournament champion | 6th | 1991 | 1 | Michigan | CCHA | 31–8–3 | At-large bid | 15th | 1991 |
| 2 | St. Lawrence | ECAC | 22–9–2 | Tournament champion | 12th | 1989 | 2 | Minnesota | WCHA | 33–10–0 | At-large bid | 19th | 1991 |
| 3 | New Hampshire | Hockey East | 22–12–2^ | At-large bid | 5th | 1983 | 3 | Lake Superior State | CCHA | 26–9–4 | Tournament champion | 6th | 1991 |
| 4 | Boston University | Hockey East | 22–8–4^ | At-large bid | 18th | 1991 | 4 | Northern Michigan | WCHA | 24–13–3 | Tournament champion | 5th | 1991 |
| 5 | Michigan State | CCHA | 23–10–8^ | At-large bid | 13th | 1990 | 5 | Clarkson | ECAC | 22–9–1 | At-large bid | 12th | 1991 |
| 6 | Wisconsin (vacated) | WCHA | 24–13–2 | At-large bid | (vacated) | 1991 | 6 | Alaska-Anchorage | Independent | 27–7–1 | At-large bid | 3rd | 1991 |

* Maine was required to forfeit 13 victories after the season concluded, their total here was their record at the time of the start of the tournament.

^ These teams records reflect the losses they had against Maine at the time that were later overturned.

== Game locations ==
- East Regional – Providence Civic Center, Providence, Rhode Island
- West Regional – Joe Louis Arena, Detroit
- Frozen Four – Knickerbocker Arena, Albany, New York

== Bracket ==
Wisconsin's participation in the 1992 tournament was later vacated by the NCAA Committee on Infractions.

First Round; March 26–27
E4 | Boston University | 2
E5 | Michigan State | 4
W3 | Lake Superior State | 7
W6 | Alaska Anchorage | 3
E3 | New Hampshire | 2
E6 | Wisconsin | 4
W4 | Northern Michigan | 8
W5 | Clarkson | 4

Quarterfinals; March 28–29
E1 | Maine | 2
E5 | Michigan State | 3
W2 | Minnesota | 3
W3 | Lake Superior State | 8
E2 | St. Lawrence | 2
E6 | Wisconsin | 5
W1 | Michigan | 7
W4 | Northern Michigan | 6

National Semifinals; April 2
E5 | Michigan State | 2
W3 | Lake Superior State | 4
E6 | Wisconsin | 4
W1 | Michigan | 2

National Championship; April 4
W3 | Lake Superior State | 5
E6 | Wisconsin (vacated) | 3

Note: * denotes overtime period(s)

== Results ==
=== East Regional – Providence, Rhode Island ===
==== First Round ====
| March 26, 1992; 8:30 pm | (3) New Hampshire | 2–4 (1–1, 1–2, 0–1) | (6) Wisconsin | Providence Civic Center; Attendance: 5,327 |

Game reference

Jeff Levy
Goalies
Duane Derksen

| (Amodeo) Scott Morrow – PP – 06:09 | 1 – 0 |
| | 1 – 1 | 08:47 – Mike Strobel (Rafalski) |
| | 1 – 2 | 29:00 – Jason Francisco (Tucker, Helgeson) |
| | 1 – 3 | 31:14 – GW – Dan Plante (Moore) |
| (Klym) Jason Dexter – 37:48 | 2 – 3 |
| | 2 – 4 | 59:50 – EN – Doug MacDonald (Harwell) |

18 min
Penalties
20 min
23
Shots
25

| March 26, 1992; 5:00 pm | (4) Boston University | 2–4 (0–0, 2–1, 0–3) | (5) Michigan State | Providence Civic Center |

Game reference

Scott Cashman
Goalies
Mike Gilmore
Referee:
Greg Shepherd
Linesmen:
Jay Borman
K.C. Chermak

| | 0 – 1 | 25:18 – Rem Murray (Smolinski, Thompson) |
| (Ma. Bavis, Sacco) Mike Prendergast – 25:50 | 1 – 1 |
| (Mi. Bavis) David Sacco – 39:04 | 2 – 1 |
| | 2 – 2 | 41:39 – Bart Turner (Woodward, Worden) |
| | 2 – 3 | 47:25 – GW – Dwayne Norris (unassisted) |
| | 2 – 4 | 52:55 – Bryan Smolinski (Murray, Messier) |

12 min
Penalties
6 min
24
Shots
26

==== Quarterfinals ====
| March 28, 1992; 8:30 pm | (1) Maine | 2–3 (1–1, 1–2, 0–0) | (4) Michigan State | Providence Civic Center; Attendance: 8,521 |

Game reference

Garth Snow
Goalies
Mike Gilmore
Referee:
Jim Burlew
Linesmen:
K.C. Chermak
Jay Borman

| (Tardiff) Jim Montgomery – 05:39 | 1 – 0 |
| | 1 – 1 | 09:53 – Dwayne Norris (White) |
| | 1 – 2 | 21:54 – PP – Dwayne Norris (White, Suk) |
| | 1 – 3 | 31:22 – GW – Bryan Smolinski (Norris, Suk) |
| (Tardiff, Montgomery) Chris Imes – 37:12 | 2 – 3 |

30 min
Penalties
18 min
38
Shots
24

| March 28, 1992; 5:00 pm | (2) St. Lawrence | 2–5 (1–2, 0–1, 1–2) | (6) Wisconsin | Providence Civic Center; Attendance: 8,521 |

Game reference

Paul Spagnoletti
Goalies
Duane Derksen
Referee:
Matt Shegos
Linesmen:
John Dobrzelewski
John Edwards

| | 0 – 1 | 01:53 – Chris Tucker (Rafalski, Francisco) |
| (Lacroix, M. Lappin) Chris Wells – PP – 06:02 | 1 – 1 |
| | 1 – 2 | 19:18 – Doug MacDonald (Richter) |
| | 1 – 3 | 38:12 – GW – Jason Zent (Plante, MacDonald) |
| | 1 – 4 | 52:56 – Blaine Moore (Plante, Kurtz) |
| (LaPerriere) Chris Wells – 54:14 | 2 – 4 |
| | 2 – 5 | 58:54 – Blaine Moore (Kurtz) |

10 min
Penalties
12 min
23
Shots
30

=== West Regional – Detroit, Michigan ===
==== First Round ====
| March 27, 1992; 8:30 pm | (3) Lake Superior State | 7–3 (3–2, 2–0, 2–1) | (6) Alaska–Anchorage | Joe Lewis Arena; Attendance: 3,827 |

Game reference

Darrin Madeley
Goalies
Paul Krake
Referee:
John Gallagher
Linesmen:
Martin Demers
Brewster Earle

| (Astley, Wetherhill) Mike Morin – 02:53 | 1 – 0 |
| | 1 – 1 | 06:52 – PP – Steve Bogoyevac (Donald, Stewart) |
| (Constantin, Barnes) Michael Smith – PP – 10:34 | 2 – 1 |
| (Strachan) Vince Faucher – 11:13 | 3 – 1 |
| | 3 – 2 | 16:08 – PP – Dean Larson (Stewart, Batters) |
| (Peters, Madeley) Brian Rolston – GW – 22:58 | 4 – 2 |
| (Moger) Clayton Beddoes – 34:23 | 5 – 2 |
| | 5 – 3 | 45:05 – PP – Derek Donald (Larson) |
| (Barnes, Rolston) Clayton Beddoes – PP – 54:36 | 6 – 3 |
| (Ralston, Hendry) Vince Faucher – 57:20 | 7 – 3 |

46 min
Penalties
22 min
24
Shots
29

| March 27, 1992; 5:00 pm | (4) Northern Michigan | 8–4 (1–1, 6–3, 1–0) | (5) Clarkson | Joe Lewis Arena; Attendance: 3,000 (est) |

Game reference

Corwin Saurdiff
Goalies
Jason Currie (out 35:42)
Chris Rogles (in 35:42)
Referee:
Frank Cole
Linesmen:
John Melanson
Bob Fowkes

| | 0 – 1 | 04:46 – PP – Scott Thomas (Dubinsky, Tuomainen) |
| (Beaufait, Carpenter) Mike Harding – 18:58 | 1 – 1 |
| | 1 – 2 | 22:57 – Steve Dubinsky (Thomas) |
| (Beattie, Johnson) Bill MacGillivray – 25:58 | 2 – 2 |
| | 2 – 3 | 27:40 – PP – Scott Thomas (Dubinsky, Bélanger) |
| | 2 – 4 | 28:53 – Scott Thomas (Dubinsky, Bélanger) |
| (Johnson) Scott Beattie – 29:02 | 3 – 4 |
| (Beaufait, Hiller) Scott Beattie – PP – 30:04 | 4 – 4 |
| (Beaufait) Joe Frederick – GW SH – 32:08 | 5 – 4 |
| (Ganz) Greg Hadden – 35:42 | 6 – 4 |
| (Beattie, Beaufait) Jim Hiller – PP – 39:18 | 7 – 4 |
| (Soukoroff) Scott Beattie – PP – 57:53 | 8 – 4 |

30 min
Penalties
16 min
34
Shots
31

==== Quarterfinals ====
| March 29, 1992; 4:30 pm | (1) Michigan | 7–6 (2–2, 2–4, 3–0) | (4) Northern Michigan | Joe Lewis Arena; Attendance: 6,205 |

Game reference

Steve Shields
Goalies
Corwin Saurdiff
Referee:
John Gallagher
Linesmen:
John Melanson
Bob Fowkes

| (Felsner, Neaton) David Oliver – PP – 01:51 | 1 – 0 |
| | 1 – 1 | 03:36 – PP – Jim Hiller (Drake, Beaufait) |
| (Neaton, Wiseman) Denny Felsner – PP – 05:48 | 2 – 1 |
| | 2 – 2 | 14:45 – PP – Scott Beattie (Hiller, Drake) |
| | 2 – 3 | 26:26 – SH – Joe Frederick (unassisted) |
| (Roberts, Felsner) David Oliver – PP – 27:16 | 3 – 3 |
| | 3 – 4 | 27:38 – Scott Beattie (Hiller) |
| | 3 – 5 | 33:01 – Jim Hiller (Drake, MacDonald) |
| | 3 – 6 | 34:11 – Joe Frederick (Harding, Beaufait) |
| (Stewart, Kramer) David Roberts – PP – 39:59 | 4 – 6 |
| (Oliver, Roberts) Pat Neaton – PP – 43:06 | 5 – 6 |
| (Tamer) Denny Felsner – 49:21 | 6 – 6 |
| (Ouimet) Mike Helber – GW – 58:22 | 7 – 6 |

24 min
Penalties
30 min
26
Shots
31

| March 29, 1992; 1:00 pm | (2) Minnesota | 3–8 (0–3, 1–2, 2–3) | (3) Lake Superior State | Joe Lewis Arena |

Game reference

(out 41:04) Jeff Stolp
(in 41:04) Tom Newman
Goalies
Darrin Madeley (out 56:55)
Blaine Lacher (in 56:55)
Referee:
Tim McConaghy
Linesmen:
Brewster Earle
Martin Demers

| | 0 – 1 | 14:15 – PP – Paul Constantin (Barnes, Smith) |
| | 0 – 2 | 15:51 – PP – Steve Barnes (Hulett) |
| | 0 – 3 | 18:39 – Brian Rolston (unassisted) |
| (Olimb, Means) Trent Klatt – 20:28 | 1 – 3 |
| | 1 – 4 | 37:53 – GW – Paul Constantin (Beddoes) |
| | 1 – 5 | 38:15 – John Hendry (Rolston) |
| | 1 – 6 | 41:04 – Paul Constantin (Ness) |
| | 1 – 7 | 41:55 – PP – Brian Rolston (Hulett, Madeley) |
| | 1 – 8 | 45:53 – PP – Sandy Moger (Rolston, Saucher) |
| (Richards, Olimb) Craig Johnson – PP – 49:18 | 2 – 8 |
| (Olimb, Means) Trent Klatt – PP – 59:09 | 3 – 8 |

16 min
Penalties
18 min
30
Shots
28

=== Frozen Four – Albany, New York ===
==== National Semifinals ====
| April 2, 1992; 2:00 pm | (W3) Lake Superior State | 4–2 (1–1, 1–1, 2–0) | (E5) Michigan State | Knickerbocker Arena; Attendance: 9,775 |

Game reference

Darrin Madeley
Goalies
Mike Gilmore
Referee:
Greg Shepherd
Linesmen:
Brewster Earle
Martin Demers

| (Smith, Hanley) Paul Constantin – 01:27 | 1 – 0 |
| | 1 – 1 | 05:28 – Nicholas Perreault (Harper, Garbarz) |
| (Hanley, Hendry) Paul Constantin – 26:32 | 2 – 1 |
| | 2 – 2 | 37:22 – Dwayne Norris (Smolinski, Murray) |
| (Hendry, Hulett) Mark Astley – GW – 50:58 | 3 – 2 |
| (Strachan, Faucher) Sandy Moger – 52:22 | 4 – 2 |

8 min
Penalties
4 min
26
Shots
24

| April 2, 1992; 7:30 pm | (W1) Michigan | 2–4 (2–2, 0–1, 0–1) | (E6) Wisconsin | Knickerbocker Arena; Attendance: 11,444 |

Game reference

Steve Shields
Goalies
Duane Derksen
Referee:
Frank Cole
Linesmen:
Bob Fowkes
John Melanson

| | 0 – 1 | 05:12 – Jason Francisco (Tucker, Helgeson) |
| (Roberts, Harlock) Denny Felsner – 06:06 | 1 – 1 |
| (unassisted) Mike Stone – SH – 15:32 | 2 – 1 |
| | 2 – 2 | 19:33 – Dan Plante (Kurtz) |
| | 2 – 3 | 38:42 – GW – Jason Francisco (Doers, Moore) |
| | 2 – 4 | 59:27 – EN – Jason Zent (MacDonald) |

16 min
Penalties
16 min
19
Shots
33

==== National Championship ====
| April 4, 1992; 8:00 pm | (W3) Lake Superior State | 5–3 (0–2, 2–0, 3–1) | (E6) Wisconsin | Knickerbocker Arena; Attendance: 12,491 |

Game reference
| Referee: Tim McConaghy; Linesmen: Brewster Earle; Martin Demers |

Scoring summary
| Period | Team | Goal | Assist(s) | Time | Score |
|---|---|---|---|---|---|
| 1st | WIS | Jason Zent | MacDonald and Richter | 9:45 | 1–0 WIS |
| 1st | WIS | Jason Zent – PP | Richter | 18:58 | 2–0 WIS |
| 2nd | LSSU | Paul Constantin – PP | Hendry and Barnes | 31:40 | 2–1 WIS |
| 2nd | LSSU | Tim Hanley | Faucher | 39:54 | 2–2 |
| 3rd | LSSU | Michael Smith – PP | unassisted | 44:16 | 3–2 LSSU |
| 3rd | WIS | Jason Zent – PP | Plante and Richter | 48:24 | 3–3 |
| 3rd | LSSU | Brian Rolston – GW | Hendry and Hulett | 55:08 | 4–3 LSSU |
| 3rd | LSSU | Jay Ness – EN | unassisted | 59:58 | 5–3 LSSU |
Penalty summary
| Period | Team | Player | Penalty | Time | PIM |
| 1st | WIS | Mike Strobel | Hooking | 5:42 | 2:00 |
| 1st | WIS | Doug MacDonald | Slashing | 7:07 | 2:00 |
| 1st | LSSU | Jim Peters | Hooking | 11:58 | 2:00 |
| 1st | LSSU | Jay Ness | Slashing | 13:48 | 2:00 |
| 1st | WIS | Dan Plante | Interference | 14:25 | 2:00 |
| 1st | WIS | Brett Kurtz | Holding | 15:39 | 2:00 |
| 1st | LSSU | Wayne Strachan | Slashing | 18:22 | 2:00 |
| 2nd | LSSU | Jim Peters | Holding | 26:44 | 2:00 |
| 2nd | WIS | Jason Francisco | Hooking | 30:00 | 2:00 |
| 2nd | WIS | Dan Plante | Hooking | 31:15 | 2:00 |
| 2nd | WIS | Jason Francisco | Holding | 34:14 | 2:00 |
| 2nd | WIS | Doug MacDonald | Slashing (served by Zent) | 34:59 | 2:00 |
| 2nd | WIS | Doug MacDonald | Misconduct | 34:59 | 10:00 |
| 2nd | LSSU | Michael Smith | Boarding | 36:37 | 2:00 |
| 2nd | WIS | Brett Kurtz | Tripping | 34:59 | 2:00 |
| 2nd | LSSU | Sandy Moger | Charging | 37:03 | 2:00 |
| 2nd | LSSU | Sandy Moger | Slashing | 40:00 | 2:00 |
| 2nd | WIS | Brett Kurtz | Slashing | 40:00 | 2:00 |
3rd
| 3rd | WIS | Maco Balkovec | Charging | 43:21 | 2:00 |
| 3rd | WIS | Brett Kurtz | Holding | 44:16 | 2:00 |
| 3rd | LSSU | Darren Wetherill | Tripping | 47:21 | 2:00 |
| 3rd | LSSU | Jim Peters | Interference | 49:30 | 2:00 |
| 3rd | LSSU | Paul Constantin | Slashing | 52:45 | 2:00 |
| 3rd | WIS | Blaine Moore | Elbowing | 57:00 | 2:00 |
| 3rd | WIS | Joe Harwell | Misconduct | 59:58 | 10:00 |

Shots by period
| Team | 1 | 2 | 3 | Total |
|---|---|---|---|---|
| Wisconsin | 12 | 3 | 12 | 27 |
| Lake Superior State | 6 | 19 | 12 | 37 |

Goaltenders
| Team | Name | Saves | Goals against | Time on ice |
|---|---|---|---|---|
| WIS | Duane Derksen | 32 | 4 | |
| LSSU | Darrin Madeley | 24 | 3 | |

== All-Tournament team ==
- G: Darrin Madeley (Lake Superior State)
- D: Mark Astley (Lake Superior State)
- D: vacated†
- F: Paul Constantin* (Lake Superior State)
- F: Brian Rolston (Lake Superior State)
- F: vacated†

* Most Outstanding Player(s)
† Participation of D: Barry Richter and F: Jason Zent vacated when Wisconsin's participation in the tournament was later vacated

== Record by conference ==
| Conference | # of Bids | Record | Win % | Regional semifinals | Frozen Four | Championship Game | Champions |
|---|---|---|---|---|---|---|---|
| CCHA | 3 | 7-2 | .778 | 3 | 3 | 1 | 1 |
| Hockey East | 3 | 0-3 | .000 | 1 | - | - | - |
| WCHA | 3 | 4-3 | .571 | 3 | 1 (vacated) | 1 (vacated) | - |
| ECAC | 2 | 0-2 | .000 | 1 | - | - | - |
| Independent | 1 | 0-1 | .000 | - | - | - | - |
