= Darrin Madeley =

- Born: February 25, 1968 (age 58) Holland Landing, Ontario, Canada
- Height: 5 ft 11 in (180 cm)
- Weight: 170 lb (77 kg; 12 st 2 lb)
- Position: Goaltender
- Caught: Left
- Played for: Ottawa Senators
- NHL draft: Undrafted
- Playing career: 1992–1999

Darrin R. Madeley (born February 25, 1968) is a Canadian former professional ice hockey goaltender. Madeley played in 39 games in the National Hockey League (NHL) with the Ottawa Senators from 1992 to 1995. The rest of his career, which lasted from 1992 to 1999, was spent in various minor leagues.

== Playing career ==
=== Amateur ===
After graduating from junior hockey in Ontario, Madeley joined the Lake Superior State Lakers of the Central Collegiate Hockey Association (CCHA), a Division I program of the United States' National Collegiate Athletic Association (NCAA). He shared the net with Brandon Reed and Brian Lukowski as a freshman in the 1989–90 season. In 30 games with the Lakers, Madeley put together a 21–7–1 record with a 2.42 goals against average (GAA), a save percentage of .915, and a shutout. Lake Superior finished second and Madeley led all goaltenders in GAA during the regular season. Lake Superior advanced to the CCHA championship game against Michigan State. Michigan State edged out Lake Superior by a score of 4–3 to take the championship. He was named to the All-CCHA Second All-Star Team and the All-CCHA Rookie Team at the end of the season.

In 1990–91, Madeley, in his sophomore season, was once again splitting time in the net with Reed and Lukowski. He improved his record to 29–3–3 in 36 games, with a 2.61 GAA and a shutout, setting a new record for most victories in a season by a goaltender for the school. He was named to the All-CCHA First All-Star Team at season's end. The team advanced to the championship final for the second consecutive season, facing the University of Michigan. Lake Superior won its first championship in a 2–1 overtime victory. By winning the CCHA, the team automatically qualified for the NCAA tournament, getting a bye to the quarterfinals. They faced Clarkson University, who as underdogs in their best-of-three series, upset the Lakers. He was named a West First-Team All-American in March 1991.

In his final year with the team in 1991–92, Madeley had a 23–6–4 record in 36 games, with a 1.93 GAA, a .917 save percentage, and two shutouts. He was once again named to the All-CCHA First All-Star Team and was named the association's best goaltender. He was also named as one of the finalists for the Hobey Baker Award as the NCAA's top player. The Lakers finished second in the CCHA and advanced to the championship game for the third consecutive season and faced the University of Michigan in a rematch of the previous year. Once again, the Lakers prevailed in a 3–1 victory. However, they faced the University of Alaska Anchorage in a one-game elimination game in the NCAA tournament. The winner would move on to the quarterfinals. The Lakers defeated Alaska-Anchorage 7–4. They advanced to the final against the University of Wisconsin–Madison and beat them 5–3 to win the school's second NCAA championship. Madeley was named to the All-Tournament Team alongside teammates Mark Astley and Brian Rolston. For the second year, he was named a West First-Team All-American.

=== Professional ===
==== Ottawa Senators ====
An undrafted free agent, Madeley was offered contracts by the Boston Bruins and the Ottawa Senators of the National Hockey League (NHL). He signed with the Senators on June 20, 1992. Madeley's signing allowed the Senators to keep to their strategy of selecting goaltender Peter Sidorkiewicz in the 1992 NHL expansion draft and negotiate with their second goaltender pick. He was assigned to Ottawa's American Hockey League (AHL) affiliate, the New Haven Senators to being the 1992–93 season. He was recalled on November 2, swapping places with Ottawa's backup Steve Weeks. He made his NHL debut on November 5, against the Calgary Flames. In 30 minutes of action, Madeley allowed six goals, as the Senators lost to the Flames by a score of 8–4, and was pulled to be replaced by Sidorkiewicz. Madeley started for the Senators the next night against the Vancouver Canucks, as the Sens lost 4–1. He backed up Sidorkiewicz until November 17, when he swapped places with Weeks once gain. Overall, in two NHL games, Madeley was 0–2–0 with a 6.67 GAA and a .773 save percentage. With New Haven he posted a 10-16-9 record with a 3.32 GAA and a .905 save percentage. New Haven finished last in the Northern Division and out of the playoffs. For his play, he was named to the AHL's Second All-Star Team.

Madeley made Ottawa's roster out of training camp for the 1993–94 season, backing up the new starter in the Senators net, Craig Billington. On November 5, 1993, he earned his first career NHL victory, as he allowed no goals in the last 20:46 of the game, as the Senators came back to defeat the Winnipeg Jets 7–6 in overtime. By March 1994, the fans of the Senators began heckling Billington and Madeley after their play had become questionable. This led to Madeley to fire back, criticizing the fans in the press. In response, Ottawa's general manager Randy Sexton assigned Madeley to Ottawa's new AHL affiliate, the Prince Edward Island Senators, to work on his game on March 3. Madeley saw some brief action in the AHL, playing in six games, with a 0–4–0 record and a 5.77 GAA and .855 save percentage. He was recalled by Ottawa on March 22 and finished the year with a 3–18–5 record in 32 games, with a 4.36 GAA and a .868 save percentage.

The 1994–95 season was delayed by the lockout, and Madeley entered training camp in January 1995 as the backup. However, shortly after the start of training camp, the Senators acquired goaltender Don Beaupre, pushing Madeley down the depth chart. He was initially loaned to the Atlanta Knights of the International Hockey League (IHL) to start the season. However, just after reporting to Atlanta, Madeley was recalled by Ottawa after an injury to Billington and prospect Jean-François Labbé before playing a game. He was once again on the move, being reassigned to Prince Edward Island on a conditioning stint before playing a game for Ottawa, swapping places with Mike Bales. In three games in the AHL, he had a 1–1–1 record with a 2.59 GAA and a .916 save percentage. He returned to Ottawa after the three games on February 6, swapping places with Bales. He made his first appearance of the season on February 27, a 2–0 loss to the Boston Bruins. Madeley was the odd man out in a three-goalie system and was loaned to the Detroit Vipers of the IHL on March 12. In nine games with the Vipers, he went 7–2–0 with a 2.41 GAA and a .914 save percentage. He was recalled by Ottawa in April after Billington was traded to Boston. With Ottawa, Madeley appeared in five games total, earning a 1–3–0 record with a 3.53 GAA and a .898 save percentage.

During the Senators 1995 training camp, Madeley suffered a groin injury. He was placed on waivers and after going unclaimed, was assigned to Prince Edward Island. He played in only one game in the AHL, earning a victory. He spent the rest of the 1995–96 season with the Detroit Vipers of the IHL, and despite sharing the net with five other goaltenders, had a 16-14-4 record with a 3.17 GAA and a .898 save percentage in 40 games. The Vipers qualified for the playoffs and faced the Indianapolis Ice in the opening round. The Vipers advanced to the second round after Madeley rattled off three straight victories. However, the Vipers were eliminated by the Orlando Solar Bears. In the post-season, Madeley had a 3–3 record with a 3.89 GAA and a save percentage of .868.

==== San Jose Sharks ====
In the 1996 offseason, Madeley was not given a contract offer by the Senators and became an unrestricted free agent. He returned the Vipers as backup to Rich Parent ahead of the 1996–97 season. In four games with Detroit, he went 2–0–0 with a 3.73 GAA and a .868 save percentage. On October 22, 1996, the San Jose Sharks signed Madeley as a replacement for the injured Chris Terreri and Wade Flaherty as backup to Kelly Hrudey. He never played a game for San Jose and was assigned to the Saint John Flames of the AHL on November 25. He at first split time with Dwayne Roloson and Ian Gordon in net, but Roloson was recalled by the Calgary Flames, and Madeley took over as starter with Gordon, Pat Haltia, and Paul Taylor backing up. With Saint John he earned a record of 11–18–11 in 46 games with a 3.21 GAA and a .900 save percentage. Saint John finished second in the Canadian Division and faced the Hamilton Bulldogs in the playoffs. In Game 1 of the playoffs, new starter Tyler Moss was chased from the net in the third period by the Bulldogs and Madeley finished the game. He made his second appearance in the series in Game 5, when Moss was pulled again, this time in the second period. Madeley had a 0–0 record and did not allow a goal in 58 minutes of action as the Bulldogs eliminated the Flames.

==== Later career ====
A free agent again, Madeley, he attended the training camp of the Fort Wayne Komets of the IHL in September 1997, but was released at the end of the month. He signed with TPS Turku of the Finnish SM-liiga on 14 October 1997, on a five-game trial, making his debut in November. He appeared in two games with TPS Turku, starting one, before his trial was terminated on November 8.

He joined the Richmond Renegades of the ECHL on February 9, 1998, after the team lost both of their goaltenders to groin injuries. He played with the Renegades for the remainder of the 1997–98 season, appearing in five games, going 1–1–0 with a 3.50 GAA and a .875 save percentage. In the 1998 offseason, the ECHL expanded by two teams, adding the Florida Everblades and the Greenville Grrrowl. Richmond left Madeley unprotected in the draft and he was selected by the Everblades. He instead joined Starbulls Rosenheim of the Deutsche Eishockey Liga, where he made three appearances. On December 9, the Everblades traded Madeley's rights to the Pensacola Ice Pilots for future considerations. The Ice Pilots acquired Madeley in hopes of saving their season as their existing rookie tandem was letting in too many goals and they sought experience. On December 11, Pensacola sent forward Mark Polak to the Everblades to complete the trade. Madeley finished the 1998–99 season with the Ice Pilots, going 12–16–3 with a 3.08 GAA and a .910 save percentage in 32 games.

He signed with the Saginaw Gears of the United Hockey League (UHL) in the 1999 offseason but never made an appearance for them as he suffered a severe ankle injury in the pregame warmup before the team's opening day match ahead of the 1999–2000 season. He was expected to miss three to five weeks. He became a player-coach under head coach Robert Dirk as the team attempted to address their goaltending situation in his absence. However, the team suffered upheaval as it moved from Saginaw, Michigan to Canton, Ohio in mid-December to become the Ohio Gears. At the end of the season, the Ohio Gears suspended operations and the UHL conducted a dispersal draft of the Gears' players. Madeley was selected by the Muskegon Fury. However, Madeley underwent surgery on his fibula and was not expected to be ready for the start of the season. He never played a game for the Fury as he had to retire due to the injury.

== Post-playing career ==
Following his retirement from hockey, Madeley was a coach with the USA Hockey National Team Development Program from 2001 to 2005. In 2002 he joined the Saginaw Spirit of the Ontario Hockey League as their goaltending coach until 2003, when he departed to join the USA Development Program as a full-time coach. However, after the Spirit let head coach Dennis Desrosiers go, Madeley was brought back in to be the interim coach until a new permanent hire could be found. He had a record of 0–1–0–1 in two games, before Moe Mantha was hired as the new head coach. From 2006, Madeley was head coach at Lake Forest Academy in Lake Forest, Illinois.

== Career statistics ==
=== Regular season and playoffs ===
			Regular season									Playoffs
Season	Team	League	GP	W	L	T	MIN	GA	SO	GAA	SV%	GP	W	L	MIN	GA	SO	GAA	SV%
1984–85	Bradford Blues	OJCHL	10	7	2	0	549	30	0	3.28	—	—	—	—	—	—	—	—	—
1985–86	Bradford Blues	OJCHL	4	2	1	0	200	15	0	4.50	—	—	—	—	—	—	—	—	—
1985–86	Newmarket Flyers	OJAHL	3	0	1	0	84	6	0	4.29	—	—	—	—	—	—	—	—	—
1986–87	Richmond Hill Dynes	OJAHL	14	6	9	1	816	67	2	4.92	—	—	—	—	—	—	—	—	—
1987–88	Richmond Hill Dynes	COJHL	32	—	—	—	1660	129	0	4.66	—	—	—	—	—	—	—	—	—
1988–89	Richmond Hill Dynes	COJHL	27	—	—	—	1404	124	0	5.30	—	—	—	—	—	—	—	—	—
1989–90	Lake Superior State University	CCHA	30	21	7	1	1683	68	1	2.42	.915	—	—	—	—	—	—	—	—
1990–91	Lake Superior State University	CCHA	36	29	3	3	2137	93	1	2.61	—	—	—	—	—	—	—	—	—
1991–92	Lake Superior State University	CCHA	36	23	6	4	2144	69	2	2.05	.917	—	—	—	—	—	—	—	—
1992–93	Ottawa Senators	NHL	2	0	2	0	90	10	0	6.66	.773	—	—	—	—	—	—	—	—
1992–93	New Haven Senators	AHL	41	10	16	9	2295	127	0	3.32	.905	—	—	—	—	—	—	—	—
1993–94	Ottawa Senators	NHL	32	3	18	5	1583	115	0	4.36	.868	—	—	—	—	—	—	—	—
1993–94	PEI Senators	AHL	6	0	4	0	270	26	0	5.77	.855	—	—	—	—	—	—	—	—
1994–95	Ottawa Senators	NHL	5	1	3	0	255	15	0	3.53	.898	—	—	—	—	—	—	—	—
1994–95	PEI Senators	AHL	3	1	1	1	185	8	0	2.59	.916	—	—	—	—	—	—	—	—
1994–95	Detroit Vipers	IHL	9	7	2	0	498	20	1	2.41	.914	—	—	—	—	—	—	—	—
1995–96	PEI Senators	AHL	1	1	0	0	60	4	0	4.00	.871	—	—	—	—	—	—	—	—
1995–96	Detroit Vipers	IHL	40	16	14	4	2047	108	0	3.17	.898	7	3	3	355	23	0	3.89	.868
1996–97	Detroit Vipers	IHL	4	2	0	0	177	11	0	3.72	.869	—	—	—	—	—	—	—	—
1996–97	Saint John Flames	AHL	46	11	18	11	2316	124	0	3.21	.900	2	0	0	58	0	0	0.00	1.000
1997–98	TPS	FIN	2	1	1	0	84	2	0	1.42	.954	—	—	—	—	—	—	—	—
1997–98	Richmond Renegades	ECHL	5	1	1	0	137	8	0	3.49	.875	—	—	—	—	—	—	—	—
1998–99	Star Bulls Rosenheim	DEL	3	—	—	—	127	8	0	3.78	.906	—	—	—	—	—	—	—	—
1998–99	Pensacola Ice Pilots	ECHL	32	12	16	3	1792	92	3	3.08	.910	—	—	—	—	—	—	—	—
NHL totals			39	4	23	5	1929	140	0	4.36	.868	—	—	—	—	—	—	—	—

== Awards and honours ==
Award	Year
College
All-CCHA Rookie Team	1990
All-CCHA Second Team	1990
All-CCHA First Team	1991
AHCA West First-Team All-American	1991
CCHA All-Tournament Team	1991
All-CCHA First Team	1992
AHCA West First-Team All-American	1992
CCHA All-Tournament Team	1992
All-NCAA All-Tournament Team	1992
AHL
Second All-Star Team	1993

== Bibliography ==
- Chaimovitch, Jason, ed. (2025). 2025–2026 American Hockey League Official Guide & Record Book. Springfield, Massachusetts: American Hockey League. OCLC 22147888.
- MacGregor, Roy (1993). Road Games: A Year in the Life of the NHL. Toronto: MacFarlane Walter & Ross. ISBN 0-921912-70-6.

Awards and achievements
Preceded by Clayton Beddoes	CCHA Most Valuable Player in Tournament; 1992	Succeeded by Blaine Lacher
