= 1992 CCHA men's ice hockey tournament =

Sports season

1992 CCHA Men's ice hockey tournament
- Dates: March 13–21, 1992
- Teams: 8
- Finals site: Joe Louis Arena; Detroit, Michigan
- Champions: Lake Superior State (2nd title)
- Winning coach: Jeff Jackson (2nd title)
- MVP: Darrin Madeley (Lake Superior State)
- CCHA Men's Ice Hockey Tournaments

The 1992 CCHA Men's Ice Hockey Tournament was the 21st CCHA Men's Ice Hockey Tournament. It was played between March 13 and March 21, 1992. First round games were played at campus sites, while 'final four' games were played at Joe Louis Arena in Detroit, Michigan. By winning the tournament, Lake Superior State received the Central Collegiate Hockey Association's automatic bid to the 1992 NCAA Division I Men's Ice Hockey Tournament.

== Format ==
The tournament featured three rounds of play. The team that finished below eighth place in the standings was not eligible for postseason play. In the quarterfinals, the first and eighth seeds, the second and seventh seeds, the third seed and sixth seeds and the fourth seed and fifth seeds played a best-of-three series, with the winners advancing to the semifinals. In the semifinals, the remaining highest and lowest seeds and second highest and second lowest seeds play a single-game, with the winners advancing to the finals. The tournament champion receives an automatic bid to the 1992 NCAA Division I Men's Ice Hockey Tournament.

== Conference standings ==
Note: GP = Games played; W = Wins; L = Losses; T = Ties; PTS = Points; GF = Goals For; GA = Goals Against

1991–92 Central Collegiate Hockey Association standings
	Conference							Overall					
	GP	W	L	T	PTS	GF	GA	GP	W	L	T	GF	GA
Michigan†	32	22	7	3	47	150	104	44	32	9	3	215	144
Lake Superior State*	32	20	8	4	44	141	78	43	30	9	4	203	100
Michigan State	32	18	7	7	43	149	105	44	26	10	8	199	143
Western Michigan	32	14	12	6	34	119	114	36	16	14	6	140	130
Miami	32	12	14	6	30	124	145	40	18	16	6	165	183
Ferris State	32	11	15	6	28	102	127	38	13	18	7	119	148
Illinois-Chicago	32	8	18	6	22	101	132	36	10	20	6	123	152
Ohio State	32	8	19	5	21	134	182	38	12	21	5	162	211
Bowling Green	32	7	20	5	19	123	156	34	8	21	5	133	165
Championship: Lake Superior State † indicates conference regular season champion * indicates conference tournament champion

== Bracket ==
Quarterfinals; March 13–15
1	Michigan	4	9	–
8	Ohio State	2	4	–
2	Lake Superior State	3	9	–
7	Illinois–Chicago	1	2	–
(Pairings are reseeded after the first round)
3	Michigan State	5	4	–
6	Ferris State	2	1	–
4	Western Michigan	1	3	–
5	Miami	3	4*	–

Semifinals; March 19
1	Michigan	6
5	Miami	2
2	Lake Superior State	5
3	Michigan State	3

Championship; March 21
1	Michigan	1
2	Lake Superior State	3
Consolation Game
3	Michigan State	8
5	Miami	5

Note: * denotes overtime period(s)

=== First round ===
==== (1) Michigan vs. (8) Ohio State ====
Michigan	4 – 2	Ohio State	Yost Ice Arena

Michigan	9 – 4	Ohio State	Yost Ice Arena

Michigan won series 2–0

==== (2) Lake Superior State vs. (7) Illinois–Chicago ====
Lake Superior State	3 – 1	Illinois–Chicago	Taffy Abel Arena

Lake Superior State	9 – 2	Illinois–Chicago	Taffy Abel Arena

Lake Superior State won series 2–0

==== (3) Michigan State vs. (6) Ferris State ====
Michigan State	5 – 2	Ferris State	Munn Ice Arena

Michigan State	4 – 1	Ferris State	Munn Ice Arena

Michigan State won series 2–0

==== (4) Western Michigan vs. (5) Miami ====
Western Michigan	1 – 3	Miami	Lawson Arena

Western Michigan	3 – 4	OT	Miami	Lawson Arena

Miami won series 2–0

=== Semifinals ===
==== (1) Michigan vs. (5) Miami ====
March 19	Michigan	6 – 2	Miami	Joe Louis Arena

==== (2) Lake Superior State vs. (3) Michigan State ====
March 19	Lake Superior State	5 – 3	Michigan State	Joe Louis Arena

=== Consolation Game ===
==== (3) Michigan State vs. (3) Miami ====
March 21	Michigan State	8 – 5	Miami	Joe Louis Arena

=== Championship ===
==== (1) Michigan vs. (2) Lake Superior State ====
March 21	Michigan	1 – 3	Lake Superior State	Joe Louis Arena

== Tournament awards ==
=== All-Tournament Team ===
- F Dwayne Norris (Michigan State)
- F Brian Wiseman (Michigan)
- F Brian Rolston (Lake Superior State)
- D Pat Neaton (Michigan)
- D Tim Hanley (Lake Superior State)
- G Darrin Madeley* (Lake Superior State)

* Most Valuable Player(s)
