= Barry Richter =

American retired ice hockey defenseman (born 1970)

- Born: September 11, 1970 (age 55) Madison, Wisconsin, U.S.
- Height: 6 ft 2 in (188 cm)
- Weight: 203 lb (92 kg; 14 st 7 lb)
- Position: Defense
- Shot: Left
- Played for: New York Rangers; Boston Bruins; New York Islanders; Montreal Canadiens; Linköpings HC; EV Zug
- National team: United States
- NHL draft: 32nd overall, 1988; Hartford Whalers
- Playing career: 1993–2008

Barron Patrick Richter (born September 11, 1970) is an American former professional ice hockey defenseman. Richter most recently played in the Nationalliga A league in Switzerland for EV Zug. He also played in the NHL with the New York Rangers, Boston Bruins, New York Islanders, and Montreal Canadiens. In 2015, Richter was inducted into the Madison Sports Hall of Fame.

== Playing career ==
Richter was drafted out of high school (Culver Military Academy) by the Hartford Whalers in the second round, 32nd overall in the 1988 NHL entry draft. After being drafted Richter attended college, playing for the University of Wisconsin–Madison for 4 years. While in college he was named to the NCAA Championship All-Tournament Team in 1992, the WCHA first All-Star Team in 1993, and the NCAA West First All-American Team, also in 1993. Richter also made his international team debut, representing the United States in the World Junior Ice Hockey Championship in 1989 and 1990 and the Ice Hockey World Championship in 1992 and 1993.

After college, Richter spent the majority of the 1993–94 season representing the United States in tournaments. He played 56 games with the U.S. National Team, playing in the 1994 Ice Hockey World Championship and the 1994 Winter Olympics. That season he also made his professional debut with the Binghamton Rangers of the AHL, appearing in 21 games.

Richter spent the majority of the next two seasons with the Binghamton Rangers. He made his NHL debut with the New York Rangers during the 1995–96 season, appearing in four games. The following year he signed with the Boston Bruins, spending the majority of the 1996–97 season with the Bruins, playing 50 games. He played the 1997–98 season with the Providence Bruins before signing with the New York Islanders in 1998. Richter then played the 1998–99 season with the Islanders, his only full season in the NHL, while also making his final international appearance in the 1999 Ice Hockey World Championship.

Following the 1998–99 season, Richter was released and picked up by the Montreal Canadiens. However, he was not able to crack the starting lineup and appeared in only 25 games over 2 years with the Canadiens. Following the 2000–01 season Richter played in the Elitserien for two years. After his stint there he joined EV Zug in the Nationalliga A League.

In 2015, Richter was inducted into the Madison Sports Hall of Fame.

== Awards and honors ==
Award	Year
All-NCAA All-Tournament Team	1992
All-WCHA First Team	1992–93
AHCA West First-Team All-American	1992–93
AHL First All-Star Team	1996
Eddie Shore Award (Most Outstanding Defenseman – AHL)	1996

== Career statistics ==
=== Regular season and playoffs ===
			Regular season					Playoffs
Season	Team	League	GP	G	A	Pts	PIM	GP	G	A	Pts	PIM
1986–87	Culver Military Academy	HS-Prep	39	15	20	35	—	—	—	—	—	—
1987–88	Culver Military Academy	HS-Prep	35	24	29	53	18	—	—	—	—	—
1988–89	Culver Military Academy	HS-Prep	19	21	29	50	16	—	—	—	—	—
1989–90	University of Wisconsin	WCHA	42	13	23	36	26	—	—	—	—	—
1990–91	University of Wisconsin	WCHA	43	15	20	35	42	—	—	—	—	—
1991–92	University of Wisconsin	WCHA	43	10	29	39	62	—	—	—	—	—
1992–93	University of Wisconsin	WCHA	42	14	32	46	74	—	—	—	—	—
1993–94	United States National Team	Intl	56	7	16	23	50	—	—	—	—	—
1993–94	Binghamton Rangers	AHL	21	0	9	9	12	—	—	—	—	—
1994–95	Binghamton Rangers	AHL	73	15	41	56	54	11	4	5	9	12
1995–96	New York Rangers	NHL	4	0	1	1	0	—	—	—	—	—
1995–96	Binghamton Rangers	AHL	69	20	61	81	64	3	0	3	3	0
1996–97	Boston Bruins	NHL	50	5	13	18	32	—	—	—	—	—
1996–97	Providence Bruins	AHL	19	2	6	8	4	10	4	4	8	4
1998–99	New York Islanders	NHL	72	6	18	24	34	—	—	—	—	—
1999–00	Montreal Canadiens	NHL	23	0	2	2	8	—	—	—	—	—
1999–00	Québec Citadelles	AHL	2	0	0	0	0	—	—	—	—	—
1999–00	Manitoba Moose	IHL	19	5	4	9	6	2	1	1	2	0
2000–01	Montreal Canadiens	NHL	2	0	0	0	2	—	—	—	—	—
2000–01	Québec Citadelles	AHL	68	4	47	51	45	6	0	3	3	2
2001–02	Linköping HC	SEL	44	5	12	17	82	—	—	—	—	—
2002–03	Linköping HC	SEL	44	6	10	16	74	—	—	—	—	—
2002–03	HC Lugano	NLA	—	—	—	—	—	9	2	6	8	10
2003–04	EV Zug	NLA	47	5	25	30	20	5	1	1	2	6
2004–05	EV Zug	NLA	38	8	19	27	43	9	3	1	4	4
2005–06	EV Zug	NLA	44	10	20	30	46	7	2	2	4	24
2006–07	EV Zug	NLA	44	9	20	29	34	8	0	1	1	14
2007–08	EV Zug	NLA	44	8	19	27	58	7	1	6	7	4
AHL totals			327	57	193	250	226	30	8	15	23	18
NHL totals			151	11	34	45	76	—	—	—	—	—
NLA totals			217	40	103	143	201	45	9	17	26	62

=== International ===
Year	Team	Event	GP	G	A	Pts	PIM
1989	United States	WJC	7	0	0	0	2
1990	United States	WJC	7	3	1	4	0
1992	United States	WC	4	1	0	1	4
1993	United States	WC	6	0	0	0	8
1994	United States	OG	8	0	3	3	4
1994	United States	WC	7	0	0	0	6
1999	United States	WC	6	2	0	2	0
Junior totals			14	3	1	4	2
Senior totals			31	3	3	6	22
