= Dan Plante =

American ice hockey player (born 1971)

- Born: October 5, 1971 (age 54) Hayward, Wisconsin, USA
- Height: 5 ft 11 in (180 cm)
- Weight: 190 lb (86 kg; 13 st 8 lb)
- Position: Right wing
- Shot: Right
- Played for: New York Islanders
- National team: United States
- NHL draft: 48th overall, 1990; New York Islanders
- Playing career: 1988–2002

Daniel Leon Plante (born October 5, 1971 in Hayward, Wisconsin) is a retired American professional ice hockey forward who played 159 games in the National Hockey League for the New York Islanders between 1994 and 1998. He was drafted as the New York Islanders' third choice and 48th overall in the 1990 NHL entry draft, directly out of high school He then spent three years at the University of Wisconsin before turning pro.

Internationally Plante played for the American national team at the 1996 and 1997 World Championships. Plante is currently employed as a player agent at Forward Hockey.

== Career statistics ==
=== Regular season and playoffs ===
			Regular season					Playoffs
Season	Team	League	GP	G	A	Pts	PIM	GP	G	A	Pts	PIM
1988–89	Edina High School	HS-MN	27	10	26	36	23	—	—	—	—	—
1989–90	Edina High School	HS-MN	24	8	18	26	12	—	—	—	—	—
1990–91	University of Wisconsin	WCHA	33	1	2	3	54	—	—	—	—	—
1991–92	University of Wisconsin	WCHA	40	15	16	31	113	—	—	—	—	—
1992–93	University of Wisconsin	WCHA	42	26	31	57	142	—	—	—	—	—
1993–94	New York Islanders	NHL	12	0	1	1	4	1	1	0	1	2
1993–94	Salt Lake Golden Eagles	IHL	66	7	17	24	148	—	—	—	—	—
1994–95	Denver Grizzlies	IHL	2	0	0	0	4	—	—	—	—	—
1995–96	New York Islanders	NHL	73	5	3	8	50	—	—	—	—	—
1996–97	New York Islanders	NHL	67	4	9	13	75	—	—	—	—	—
1997–98	New York Islanders	NHL	7	0	1	1	6	—	—	—	—	—
1997–98	Utah Grizzlies	IHL	73	22	27	49	125	4	0	2	2	14
1998–99	Chicago Wolves	IHL	81	21	12	33	119	10	1	5	6	10
1999–00	Chicago Wolves	IHL	79	11	11	22	71	16	3	5	8	14
2000–01	Chicago Wolves	IHL	76	15	11	26	58	16	1	0	1	27
2001–02	Chicago Wolves	AHL	70	11	15	26	44	6	0	0	0	15
IHL totals			377	76	78	154	525	46	5	12	17	65
NHL totals			159	9	14	23	135	1	1	0	1	2

=== International ===
Year	Team	Event	GP	G	A	Pts	PIM
1996	United States	WC	7	1	1	2	0
1997	United States	WC	8	1	1	2	6
Senior totals			15	2	2	4	6

== Awards and honors ==
Award	Year
WCHA All-Tournament Team	1992
Bob Nystrom Award	1995
