= Duane Derksen =

Canadian ice hockey player (born 1968)

- Born: July 7, 1968 (age 58) Saint Boniface, Manitoba, Canada
- Height: 6 ft 1 in (185 cm)
- Weight: 188 lb (85 kg; 13 st 6 lb)
- Position: Goaltender
- Caught: Left
- Played for: Wisconsin; Baltimore Skipjacks; Hampton Roads Admirals; Milwaukee Admirals; Rochester Americans; Adirondack Red Wings; Minnesota Moose; Richmond Renegades; Madison Monsters; Oulun Kärpät; Tappara; Peoria Rivermen; Iserlohn Roosters; EC Bad Tölz; Missouri River Otters
- NHL draft: 57th, 1988; Washington Capitals
- Playing career: 1988–2004

Duane Edward Derksen is a Canadian ice hockey coach and former goaltender who was an All-American for Wisconsin and led the Peoria Rivermen to a Kelly Cup championship in 2000.

== Career ==
Derksen was a highly rated prospect in his junior career. In spite of poor statistics with the Winkler Flyers, Derksen was twice named as the best goaltender in the MJHL. He was selected in the 3rd round of the NHL Draft and began attending the University of Wisconsin–Madison that fall. In his freshman season, Derksen served as a backup to future NHL All-Star Curtis Joseph, playing in only a quarter of Wisconsin's games. After Joseph turned pro after 1989, the team turned to Derksen as the starter and he came through in a big way. He improved his stats significantly and won a program record 31 games that season (still a Wisconsin record as of 2021). Derksen was instrumental in helping the Badgers finish first in the WCHA and was the top goaltender as Wisconsin won their conference tournament. Wisconsin received the second western seed and began the NCAA Tournament in the quarterfinals. Derksen was key in the Badgers winning two close games, particularly the national semifinal against Boston College, and made the championship game. Derksen wasn't as sharp in the final game but he didn't have to be. Wisconsin's offense overpowered the star-struck Colgate Raiders and the Badgers easily won the game 7–3.

Derksen continued to improve in his junior season, finishing in the top 10 in the nation in goals against average with 3 shutouts to his credit. The Badgers weren't as good with several departures from the roster but the team did manage to receive another NCAA tournament bid. Derksen was named an alternate captain for his senior year and was the leader for the team. He helped Wisconsin to a second place finish in the WCHA and was named the conference Player of the Year. While the Badgers were upset in the WCHA Tournament, they still managed to earn the final western seed for the NCAA Tournament. Derksen played a pivotal role in getting the Badgers to win three games as an underdog and reach the championship game. The last match turned out to be a controversial affair, with both Wisconsin and Lake Superior State receiving double-digit penalties in the game. The Badgers got out to a 2–0 lead after the first but a series of questionable calls allowed the Lakers to take a lead early in the third. Wisconsin was so incensed by the performance of the referee that assistant coach Bill Zito accosted the official after the game with two other players, an incident for which all three were suspended by the NCAA. In the end, however, the result didn't matter for the Badgers as the team had committed several recruiting violations and their entire appearance in the 1992 tournament was later vacated. Neither Derksen nor anyone from the 1990 team had been a part of the violations so his championship was safe.

After graduating with a bachelor's in history, Derksen began his professional career in the Washington Capitals' farm system. He spent three fairly unspectacular seasons bouncing between minor leagues, producing decent numbers but not playing well enough to get a shot at the NHL level. Once his rookie contract expired he was not resigned and then spent two years with the Madison Monsters before heading to Europe. Derksen had much more success with Oulun Kärpät and was able to sell his success to the Peoria Rivermen. He served as the team's starter for the 2000 season and led them to a league championship that season. Despite the success he had no takers at the next level of the minor leagues and returned to Europe. Derksen was back with the Rivermen two years later and, though his numbers were even better, he wasn't able to replicate the success he had had the first time around. After one more season of professional hockey he hung up his pads and called it a career.

With his playing days behind him, Derksen transitioned into Sales and marketing working in the field for two years before returning to college to earn a business degree. He continues as an account manager, most recently with Ingersoll Rand (as of 2021), but did eventually return to ice hockey as an assistant coach in the summer of 2020.

== Statistics ==
=== Regular season and playoffs ===
			Regular season									Playoffs
Season	Team	League	GP	W	L	T	MIN	GA	SO	GAA	SV%	GP	W	L	MIN	GA	SO	GAA	SV%
1986–87	Winkler Flyers	MJHL	48	—	—	—	—	—	—	4.80	—	—	—	—	—	—	—	—	—
1987–88	Winkler Flyers	MJHL	38	—	—	—	—	—	—	5.20	—	—	—	—	—	—	—	—	—
1988–89	Wisconsin	WCHA	11	4	5	0	561	37	1	3.96	.877	—	—	—	—	—	—	—	—
1989–90	Wisconsin	WCHA	41	31	8	1	2345	133	2	3.40	.889	—	—	—	—	—	—	—	—
1990–91	Wisconsin	WCHA	42	24	15	3	2474	133	3	3.23	.880	—	—	—	—	—	—	—	—
1991–92	Wisconsin	WCHA	35	21	12	2	2064	110	0	3.20	.878	—	—	—	—	—	—	—	—
1992–93	Hampton Roads Admirals	ECHL	13	7	5	0	747	48	0	3.86	.884	—	—	—	—	—	—	—	—
1992–93	Baltimore Skipjacks	AHL	26	6	13	3	1247	86	0	4.14	.875	4	—	—	—	—	—	—	—
1993–94	Milwaukee Admirals	IHL	9	4	2	2	490	28	0	3.42	.890	—	—	—	—	—	—	—	—
1993–94	Rochester Americans	AHL	6	2	1	1	235	14	0	3.57	.891	—	—	—	—	—	—	—	—
1993–94	Adirondack Red Wings	AHL	11	4	6	0	599	37	0	3.70	.873	—	—	—	—	—	—	—	—
1994–95	Minnesota Moose	IHL	7	1	3	3	250	21	0	5.02	.837	—	—	—	—	—	—	—	—
1994–95	Richmond Renegades	ECHL	27	15	8	2	1558	83	0	3.20	.885	4	—	—	—	—	—	—	—
1995–96	Madison Monsters	CoHL	40	19	15	3	2209	128	1	3.48	.890	6	—	—	—	—	—	—	—
1995–96	Fort Wayne Komets	IHL	1	0	0	0	22	3	0	8.01	.750	—	—	—	—	—	—	—	—
1996–97	Milwaukee Admirals	IHL	1	0	0	0	34	1	0	1.79	.909	—	—	—	—	—	—	—	—
1996–97	Madison Monsters	CoHL	59	36	17	5	3364	190	0	3.39	.899	5	—	—	—	—	—	—	—
1996–97	Milwaukee Admirals	IHL	1	0	0	1	60	2	0	2.00	.951	—	—	—	—	—	—	—	—
1997–98	Oulun Kärpät	I-Divisioona	35	—	—	—	—	—	—	2.25	.920	5	—	—	—	—	—	—	—
1998–99	Oulun Kärpät	I-Divisioona	26	—	—	—	—	—	—	1.72	.925	3	—	—	—	—	—	2.36	.913
1998–99	Tappara	SM-liiga	5	2	3	0	260	17	0	3.93	.861	—	—	—	—	—	—	—	—
1999–00	Peoria Rivermen	ECHL	43	30	9	3	2487	122	1	2.94	.891	16	—	—	—	—	—	—	—
2000–01	Iserlohn Roosters	DEL	40	—	—	—	—	—	—	2.94	.894	—	—	—	—	—	—	—	—
2001–02	EC Bad Tölz	2nd Bundesliga	41	24	17	0	2423	109	7	2.70	—	3	—	—	—	—	—	—	—
2002–03	Peoria Rivermen	ECHL	29	14	9	3	1629	74	3	2.72	.909	2	—	—	—	—	—	—	—
2003–04	Missouri River Otters	UHL	20	4	14	1	1183	88	0	4.46	.880	—	—	—	—	—	—	—	—
MJHL totals			86	—	—	—	—	—	—	—	—	—	—	—	—	—	—	—	—
NCAA totals			129	80	40	6	7444	413	6	3.33	.886	—	—	—	—	—	—	—	—
AHL totals			43	12	20	4	2081	137	0	3.95	.877	4	—	—	—	—	—	—	—
IHL totals			19	5	5	6	856	55	1	3.86	.877	—	—	—	—	—	—	—	—
ECHL totals			112	66	31	8	6421	327	4	3.06	.894	22	—	—	—	—	—	—	—
IHL totals			19	5	5	6	856	55	1	3.86	.877	—	—	—	—	—	—	—	—
CoHL/UHL totals			119	59	46	9	6756	406	1	3.61	.892	11	—	—	—	—	—	—	—
I-Divisioona totals			61	—	—	—	—	—	—	—	—	17	—	—	—	—	—	—	—

== Awards and honors ==
Award	Year
MJHL First-Team All-Star	1986–87
MJHL Top Goaltender	1986–87
MJHL First-Team All-Star	1987–88
MJHL Top Goaltender	1987–88
All-WCHA Second Team	1989–90
WCHA All-Tournament Team	1990
All-NCAA All-Tournament Team	1990
All-WCHA Second Team	1990–91
All-WCHA First Team	1991–92
AHCA West Second-Team All-American	1991–92

Awards and achievements
Preceded by Scott Beattie	WCHA Most Valuable Player; 1991–92	Succeeded by Derek Plante
