= Michael Smith (ice hockey) =

Canadian ice hockey player

- Born: January 17, 1971 (age 55) Winnipeg, Manitoba, Canada
- Height: 6 ft 0 in (183 cm)
- Weight: 185 lb (84 kg; 13 st 3 lb)
- Position: Defenseman
- Shot: Left
- Played for: Lake Superior State; Rochester Americans; Roanoke Express; Minnesota Moose; Tulsa Oilers; Saint John Flames; Saginaw Lumber Kings
- NHL draft: 255th overall, 1991; Buffalo Sabres
- Playing career: 1989–1998

Michael Smith (born January 17, 1971) is a Canadian retired ice hockey defenseman who was an All-American for Lake Superior State.

== Career ==
Smith was recruited to Lake Superior State in 1989 and played his freshman season under Frank Anzalone. Smith was an unheralded but effective player his first season, helping the Lakers tie the program record with 33 wins. The following season, with Anzalone leaving to coach in the professional ranks, Smith saw his ice time and production blossom under former assistant Jeff Jackson. Smith more than doubled his career totals and got LSSU to set a new program record with 36 wins to go with the Lakers' first conference championship. Lake State received the top western seed, however, Clarkson arrived ready to play in the 1991 national quarterfinals and took two of three games to knock out the tournament favorites. Despite the bad end, Smith was selected by the Buffalo Sabres in the 12th round of the NHL Draft.

For his junior season, Smith's numbers declined slightly but that didn't stop the Lakers from having another dominant campaign. LSSU finished second in the CCHA but used their stellar defense to capture a second conference title and head back to the NCAA tournament. This time the team was a 3-seed and missed out on a bye, but the Lakers persevered and ran roughshod over their opponents in the first two rounds. They slowed down a bit in the national semifinal, but were still able to drop Michigan State 4–2. The championship game against Wisconsin turned into a bit of a debacle due to questionable penalty calls but the Lakers were the ones who were ahead when the dust settled. Smith scored lake Superior's third goal of the game to give his team its first lead and helped shut down the Badger's offense in the later half of the game to give LSSU its second national championship.

Smith was named an alternate captain for his senior season and the Lakers were again one of the best teams in the country. Lake State won its third consecutive conference title while Smith was named an All-American. LSSU received the top western seed once more but this time the team used it to their advantage. Lake State marched all the way to the championship game and were faced with one of the most dominant teams in NCAA history, 1993 Maine. The Black Bears got off to a quick start with two goals before the first period was half over but Lake Superior's defense tightened up afterwards and allowed their offense to begin whittling down Maine's advantage. The Lakers scored 4 consecutive goals in just over 20 minutes to take a 2-goal lead into the third. Unfortunately for Smith, his team was facing down the nation's top offense, led by future Hall of Famer Paul Kariya, and Maine was able to get three goals in quick succession to snatch victory away from Lake Superior. With his college career now over, Smith finished out the year with a pair of games for the Rochester Americans.

Buffalo decided not to sign Smith to a rookie contract so he ended up joining his former coach, Frank Anzalone, with the Roanoke Express. Smith played the bulk of the next 5 seasons for Roanoke, leaving several times to play AAA hockey with several teams but he could never stick at the top level of the minor leagues. When Anzalone became the first head coach for the Lowell Lock Monsters in 1998, Smith decided to call it a career and retired as a player.

== Statistics ==
=== Regular season and playoffs ===
			Regular Season					Playoffs
Season	Team	League	GP	G	A	Pts	PIM	GP	G	A	Pts	PIM
1989–90	Lake Superior State	CCHA	41	4	10	14	6	—	—	—	—	—
1990–91	Lake Superior State	CCHA	43	5	29	34	30	—	—	—	—	—
1991–92	Lake Superior State	CCHA	43	8	17	25	34	—	—	—	—	—
1992–93	Lake Superior State	CCHA	42	5	25	30	42	—	—	—	—	—
1992–93	Rochester Americans	AHL	2	0	1	1	0	—	—	—	—	—
1993–94	Roanoke Express	ECHL	67	5	57	62	32	2	0	0	0	0
1994–95	Minnesota Moose	IHL	13	0	2	2	0	—	—	—	—	—
1994–95	Roanoke Express	ECHL	57	6	40	46	59	8	4	2	6	8
1995–96	Tulsa Oilers	CHL	4	0	0	0	2	—	—	—	—	—
1995–96	Roanoke Express	ECHL	69	10	38	48	41	3	0	0	0	4
1996–97	Saint John Flames	AHL	12	0	5	5	12	—	—	—	—	—
1996–97	Roanoke Express	ECHL	57	6	35	41	25	—	—	—	—	—
1997–98	Saginaw Lumber Kings	UHL	6	0	2	2	2	—	—	—	—	—
1997–98	Roanoke Express	ECHL	62	5	19	24	24	9	1	4	5	4
NCAA totals			169	22	81	103	112	—	—	—	—	—
AHL totals			14	0	6	6	12	—	—	—	—	—
ECHL totals			312	32	189	221	181	22	5	6	11	16

== Awards and honors ==
Award	Year
All-CCHA Second Team	1992–93
AHCA West Second-Team All-American	1992–93
CCHA All-Tournament Team	1993
NCAA All-Tournament Team	1993
