= Jason Zent =

American ice hockey player

- Born: April 15, 1971 (age 53); Buffalo, New York, U.S.
- Height: 5 ft 11 in (180 cm)
- Weight: 204 lb (93 kg; 14 st 8 lb)
- Position: Left wing
- Shot: Left
- Played for: Ottawa Senators; Philadelphia Flyers
- National team: United States
- NHL draft: 44th overall, 1989; New York Islanders
- Playing career: 1994–1999

Jason William Zent (born April 15, 1971) is an American former professional ice hockey player. He played parts of three seasons in the National Hockey League (NHL) for the Ottawa Senators and Philadelphia Flyers.

== Career statistics ==
			Regular season					Playoffs
Season	Team	League	GP	G	A	Pts	PIM	GP	G	A	Pts	PIM
1990–91	Wisconsin Badgers	NCAA	39	19	18	37	51	—	—	—	—	—
1991–92	Wisconsin Badgers	NCAA	43	27	17	44	134	—	—	—	—	—
1992–93	Wisconsin Badgers	NCAA	40	26	12	38	88	—	—	—	—	—
1993–94	Wisconsin Badgers	NCAA	42	20	21	41	120	—	—	—	—	—
1994–95	Prince Edward Island Senators	AHL	55	15	11	26	46	9	6	1	7	6
1995–96	Prince Edward Island Senators	AHL	68	14	5	19	61	5	2	1	3	4
1996–97	Worcester IceCats	AHL	45	14	10	24	45	5	3	4	7	4
1996–97	Ottawa Senators	NHL	22	3	3	6	9	—	—	—	—	—
1997–98	Detroit Vipers	IHL	4	1	0	1	0	—	—	—	—	—
1997–98	Worcester IceCats	AHL	66	25	17	42	67	11	2	0	2	6
1997–98	Ottawa Senators	NHL	3	0	0	0	4	—	—	—	—	—
1998–99	Philadelphia Phantoms	AHL	64	13	13	26	82	16	2	4	6	22
1998–99	Philadelphia Flyers	NHL	2	0	0	0	0	—	—	—	—	—
1999–00	Philadelphia Phantoms	AHL	11	0	0	0	22	—	—	—	—	—
	NHL totals		27	3	3	6	13	—	—	—	—	—
	NCAA totals		164	92	68	160	393	—	—	—	—	—
	AHL totals		309	81	56	137	323	—	—	—	—	—

== Awards and honors ==
Award	Year
All-WCHA Rookie Team	1990–91
All-NCAA All-Tournament Team	1992
