= Paul Constantin =

Canadian ice hockey player

- Born: May 16, 1968 (age 58) Burlington, Ontario, Canada
- Height: 6 ft 1 in (185 cm)
- Weight: 190 lb (86 kg; 13 st 8 lb)
- Position: Left wing
- Played for: Lake Superior State; Flint Bulldogs; Muskegon Fury; Green Bay Ice; Jacksonville Bullets; Bracknell Bees; Lee Valley Lions; Chelmsford Chieftains; Medway Bears; Peterborough Pirates; Winston-Salem IceHawks; New Mexico Scorpions; Mohawk Valley Prowlers; Amarillo Rattlers; Dundas Real McCoys
- NHL draft: 191st overall, 1988; Vancouver Canucks
- Playing career: 1988–2003

Paul Constantin (born May 16, 1968) is a Canadian former professional ice hockey player who was the Most Outstanding Player for the 1992 NCAA Tournament.

== Career ==
Constantin joined the program at Lake Superior State immediately after their first National Championship. He was a depth forward for three seasons but did help the Lakers return to the national tournament each year. As a senior, Constantin's offensive output dramatically improved and more than doubled his career totals. Constantin led the team in scoring during the season and got LSSU to finish second in the CCHA. The team won the conference title for the second consecutive year. The Lakers received the 3rd western seed and the offense dominated in their first two contests, winning 7–3 and 8–3 to make the program's second Frozen Four. In the semifinal, Constantin scored twice in the first and propelled the Lakers into the championship game. After the team went down 0–2 to Wisconsin early, Constantin got the Lakers on the board and began a 3-goal run that would eventually lead to a 5–3 win and a second championship for the Lakers. Constantin was named tournament MOP for his timely scoring.

After graduating, Constantin began his professional career in the Colonial Hockey League but ended up playing for four different teams during the year. He headed to Europe and played the next three seasons bouncing between teams in the United Kingdom. He found much more success in the British leagues, averaging more than two points per game at each of his stops. Once the 1998 season was over, he returned to North America and played parts of three years in low-level minor leagues before retiring in 2000. He later played a few seasons of senior hockey before hanging up his skates for good.

== Career statistics ==
=== Regular season and playoffs ===
			Regular season					Playoffs
Season	Team	League	GP	G	A	Pts	PIM	GP	G	A	Pts	PIM
1986–87	Burlington Cougars	CJBHL	—	—	—	—	—	—	—	—	—	—
1987–88	Burlington Cougars	CJBHL	43	31	46	77	40	—	—	—	—	—
1988–89	Lake Superior State	CCHA	28	5	5	10	0	—	—	—	—	—
1989–90	Lake Superior State	CCHA	29	6	2	8	10	—	—	—	—	—
1990–91	Lake Superior State	CCHA	32	9	9	18	4	—	—	—	—	—
1991–92	Lake Superior State	CCHA	43	21	31	52	48	—	—	—	—	—
1992–93	Flint Bulldogs	CoHL	11	3	2	5	4	—	—	—	—	—
1992–93	Muskegon Fury	CoHL	9	1	3	4	4	—	—	—	—	—
1992–93	Green Bay Ice	AHA	12	3	14	17	4	—	—	—	—	—
1992–93	Jacksonville Bullets	SuHL	24	11	13	24	11	5	3	1	4	4
1993–94	Bracknell Bees	BHL	33	44	38	82	58	—	—	—	—	—
1994–95	Lee Valley Lions	BD1	28	42	36	78	106	—	—	—	—	—
1994–95	Bracknell Bees	BHL	14	15	14	29	8	6	7	11	18	6
1995–96	Chelmsford Chieftains	BD1	9	10	9	19	6	—	—	—	—	—
1996–97	Medway Bears	BNL	51	58	57	115	119	—	—	—	—	—
1997–98	Peterborough Pirates	BNL	31	34	41	75	55	8	10	11	21	4
1997–98	Winston-Salem IceHawks	UHL	6	0	1	1	0	—	—	—	—	—
1998–99	New Mexico Scorpions	WPHL	8	2	3	5	6	—	—	—	—	—
1998–99	Mohawk Valley Prowlers	UHL	18	4	5	9	0	—	—	—	—	—
1999–00	Amarillo Rattlers	WPHL	8	2	3	5	6	—	—	—	—	—
2001–02	Dundas Real McCoys	OHA-sr.	26	34	39	73	10	—	—	—	—	—
2002–03	Dundas Real McCoys	OHA-sr.	6	3	2	5	2	—	—	—	—	—
NCAA totals			132	41	47	88	62	—	—	—	—	—
BHL totals			47	59	52	111	66	6	7	11	18	6
BD1 totals			37	52	45	97	112	—	—	—	—	—
BNL totals			82	92	98	190	174	8	10	11	21	4

== Awards and honors ==
Award	Year
All-NCAA All-Tournament Team	1992
NCAA Tournament MVP	1992

Awards and achievements
Preceded by Scott Beattie	NCAA Tournament Most Outstanding Player; 1992	Succeeded by Jim Montgomery
