= Mike Strobel =

Canadian journalist

- Born: c. 1955
- Occupation: Journalist
- Known for: Editor and columnist, Toronto Sun

Mike Strobel (born c. 1955) is a Canadian journalist, formerly a columnist for the Toronto Sun.

After attending the School of Journalism at Carleton University Strobel joined the Calgary Sun in 1980. He moved to the Toronto Sun where he became managing editor in 1989 and subsequently its editor-in-chief in 1999 until 2001 at which time he resigned. Strobel continued with the Sun as a featured columnist.

== Bibliography ==
- Strobel, Mike (2010). Bad Girls and Other Perils. Dundurn Press. ISBN 978-1554887866.
- Strobel, Mike (2021). Small Miracles - The Inspiring Kids Of Variety Village. North Channel Press ISBN 978-1-7779192-0-7.
- Strobel, Mike (2023). Viking Cat - Saga of Tulip the Brave on Manitoulin Island. North Channel Press ISBN 978-1-777-9192-1-4.

== Awards ==
- Mike Strobel was voted Top Journalist of Toronto in the Top Choice Awards survey in 2012 and 2013.
- Reader Views Gold Award for Small Miracles - The Inspiring Kids Of Variety Village.
- Independent Publisher Silver Book Award for Small Miracles - The Inspiring Kids of Variety Village.
- Nautilus Silver Book Award for Small Miracles - The Inspiring Kids of Variety Village.
