= Mark Astley =

Canadian ice hockey player (born 1969)

- Born: March 30, 1969 (age 57) Calgary, Alberta, Canada
- Height: 6 ft 1 in (185 cm)
- Weight: 189 lb (86 kg; 13 st 7 lb)
- Position: Defence
- Shot: Left
- Played for: HC Lugano; HC Ambrì–Piotta; Buffalo Sabres; Rochester Americans; SC Langnau; EHC Basel
- National team: Canada
- NHL draft: 194th overall, 1989; Buffalo Sabres
- Playing career: 1992–2007
Medal record
Men's ice hockey
Silver medal – second place	Lillehammer 1994	Team competition

Mark Astley (born March 30, 1969) is a Canadian former professional ice hockey defenceman. He was drafted by the Buffalo Sabres in the tenth round, 194th overall, of the 1989 NHL entry draft. He retired at the end of the 2006–2007 season.

In his NHL career, Astley played in 75 games, all for Buffalo. He scored four goals and had nineteen assists.

Astley won a silver medal playing for Canada in the 1994 Winter Olympics.

== Awards and honours ==
Award	Year
All-CCHA Second Team	1990–91
All-CCHA First Team	1991–92
AHCA West First-Team All-American	1991–92
All-NCAA All-Tournament Team	1992

== Career statistics ==
=== Regular season and playoffs ===
			Regular season					Playoffs
Season	Team	League	GP	G	A	Pts	PIM	GP	G	A	Pts	PIM
1987–88	Calgary Canucks	AJHL	52	25	37	62	106	25	9	12	21	—
1988–89	Lake Superior State	CCHA	42	3	12	15	26	—	—	—	—	—
1989–90	Lake Superior State	CCHA	43	7	25	32	74	—	—	—	—	—
1990–91	Lake Superior State	CCHA	45	19	27	46	50	—	—	—	—	—
1991–92	Lake Superior State	CCHA	43	12	37	49	65	—	—	—	—	—
1991–92	Canada	Intl	11	2	2	4	6	—	—	—	—	—
1992–93	HC Lugano	NDA	30	10	12	22	57	—	—	—	—	—
1992–93	Canada	Intl	22	4	14	18	14	—	—	—	—	—
1993–94	HC Ambrì–Piotta	NDA	25	4	9	13	17	—	—	—	—	—
1993–94	Canada	Intl	13	4	8	12	6	—	—	—	—	—
1993–94	Buffalo Sabres	NHL	1	0	0	0	0	—	—	—	—	—
1994–95	Buffalo Sabres	NHL	14	2	1	3	12	2	0	0	0	0
1994–95	Rochester Americans	AHL	46	5	24	29	49	3	0	2	2	2
1995–96	Buffalo Sabres	NHL	60	2	18	20	80	—	—	—	—	—
1996–97	Phoenix Roadrunners	IHL	52	6	11	17	43	—	—	—	—	—
1997–98	HC Lugano	NDA	19	1	5	6	19	4	0	1	1	0
1998–99	HC Lugano	NDA	41	3	2	5	30	16	1	3	4	33
1999–2000	HC Lugano	NLA	40	1	13	14	46	13	0	5	5	14
2000–01	HC Lugano	NLA	5	1	3	4	2	18	1	2	3	12
2001–02	HC Lugano	NLA	37	0	10	10	79	13	2	3	5	10
2002–03	HC Lugano	NLA	38	4	16	20	93	16	0	4	4	38
2003–04	HC Lugano	NLA	42	6	12	18	95	13	1	4	5	58
2004–05	SC Langnau	NLA	44	1	8	9	36	—	—	—	—	—
2005–06	EHC Basel	NLA	43	6	9	15	76	5	0	1	1	12
2006–07	EHC Basel	NLA	29	4	7	11	90	—	—	—	—	—
NDA/NLA totals			393	41	106	147	640	98	5	23	28	177
NHL totals			75	4	19	23	92	2	0	0	0	0

=== International ===
Year	Team	Event	GP	G	A	Pts	PIM
1994	Canada	OG	8	0	1	1	4
Senior totals			8	0	1	1	4

Awards and achievements
Preceded by Jason Woolley	CCHA Best Offensive Defenseman; 1991–92	Succeeded by Joe Cook
