= Doug MacDonald =

Canadian ice hockey player

Doug Macdonald
- Born: February 8, 1969 (age 57) Assiniboia, Saskatchewan, Canada
- Height: 6 ft 0 in (183 cm)
- Weight: 192 lb (87 kg; 13 st 10 lb)
- Position: Left wing
- Shot: Left
- Played for: Buffalo Sabres
- NHL draft: 77th overall, 1989; Buffalo Sabres
- Playing career: 1992–2003

Douglas Bruce Macdonald (born February 8, 1969) is a Canadian former professional ice hockey player.

He was drafted in the fourth round, 77th overall, in the 1989 NHL entry draft by the Buffalo Sabres. He played fifteen games in the National Hockey League with the Sabres, scoring one goal. He is currently a pro scout for the Columbus Blue Jackets.

== Personal ==
Macdonald attended University of Wisconsin, majored in Political Science. He named Mark Messier as his favorite player. He was born to Ian Macdonald and wife Fay Macdonald.

== Career statistics ==
			Regular season					Playoffs
Season	Team	League	GP	G	A	Pts	PIM	GP	G	A	Pts	PIM
1985–86	Langley Eagles	BCJHL	45	21	33	54	8	—	—	—	—	—
1986–87	Delta Flyers	BCJHL	51	28	49	77	61	—	—	—	—	—
1987–88	Delta Flyers	BCJHL	51	50	54	104	72	9	5	9	14	16
1988–89	University of Wisconsin	NCAA	44	23	25	48	50	—	—	—	—	—
1989–90	University of Wisconsin	NCAA	44	16	35	51	52	—	—	—	—	—
1990–91	University of Wisconsin	NCAA	31	20	26	46	50	—	—	—	—	—
1991–92	University of Wisconsin	NCAA	33	16	28	44	76	—	—	—	—	—
1992–93	Buffalo Sabres	NHL	5	1	0	1	2	—	—	—	—	—
1992–93	Rochester Americans	AHL	64	25	33	58	58	7	0	2	2	4
1993–94	Buffalo Sabres	NHL	4	0	0	0	0	—	—	—	—	—
1993–94	Rochester Americans	AHL	63	25	19	44	46	4	1	1	2	8
1994–95	Buffalo Sabres	NHL	2	0	0	0	0	—	—	—	—	—
1994–95	Rochester Americans	AHL	58	21	25	46	73	5	0	1	1	0
1995–96	Cincinnati Cyclones	IHL	71	19	40	59	66	15	1	3	4	14
1996–97	Cincinnati Cyclones	IHL	65	20	34	54	36	3	0	0	0	0
1997–98	Cincinnati Cyclones	IHL	70	17	19	36	64	4	0	4	4	0
1998–99	Cincinnati Cyclones	IHL	33	7	11	18	22	—	—	—	—	—
1999–00	Cincinnati Cyclones	IHL	7	0	1	1	2	—	—	—	—	—
1999–00	Kölner Haie	DEL	26	6	10	16	12	10	4	1	5	12
2000–01	Kölner Haie	DEL	57	9	11	20	58	3	0	0	0	0
2001–02	Moskitos Essen	DEL	49	12	17	29	70	—	—	—	—	—
2002–03	Belfast Giants	BISL	32	11	10	21	30	5	1	0	1	12
NHL totals			11	1	0	1	2	—	—	—	—	—
AHL totals			185	71	77	148	177	16	1	4	5	12

== Awards and honors ==
Award	Year
WCHA All-Tournament Team	1989
