= Brian Rolston =

American ice hockey player (born 1973)

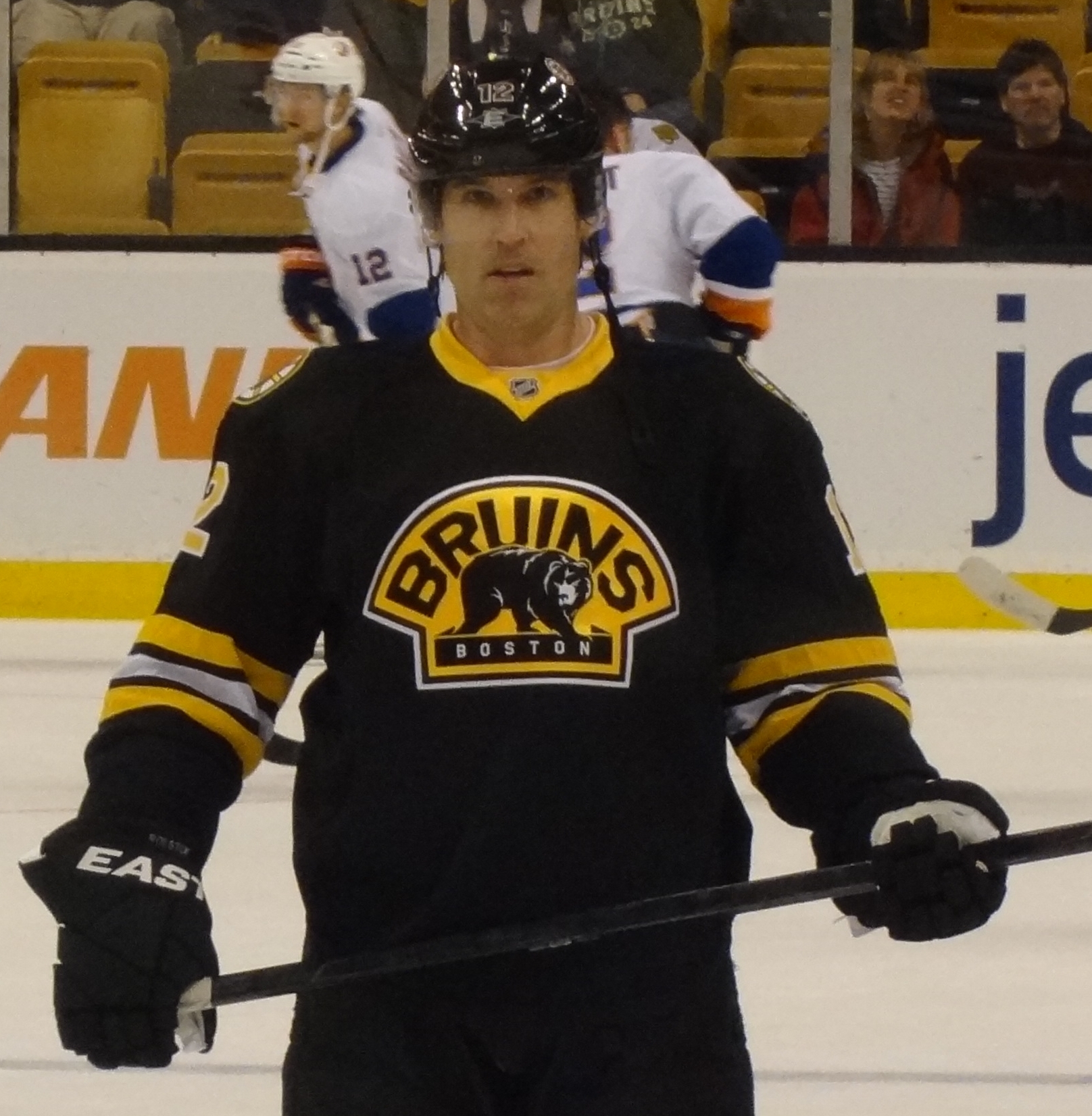
- Rolston with the Boston Bruins in 2012
- Born: February 21, 1973 (age 53) Flint, Michigan, U.S.
- Height: 6 ft 2 in (188 cm)
- Weight: 215 lb (98 kg; 15 st 5 lb)
- Position: Center
- Shot: Left
- Played for: New Jersey Devils; Colorado Avalanche; Boston Bruins; Minnesota Wild; New York Islanders
- National team: United States
- NHL draft: 11th overall, 1991; New Jersey Devils
- Playing career: 1993–2012
Medal record
Representing United States
Ice hockey
Olympic Games
Silver medal – second place	2002 Salt Lake City
World Championships
Bronze medal – third place	1996 Vienna
World Junior Championships
Bronze medal – third place	1992 Kaufbeuren

Brian Lee Rolston (born February 21, 1973) is an American former professional ice hockey player who most recently played for the Boston Bruins of the National Hockey League (NHL). He won a Stanley Cup with the New Jersey Devils in 1995, and the World Cup of Hockey in 1996 playing for the United States. Rolston has represented the U.S. three times in Olympic competition for ice hockey. In the 2002 Salt Lake City Olympics, he won the silver medal. Rolston was born in Flint, Michigan, but grew up in Ann Arbor, Michigan. He has served as head coach of the Little Caesars 2001 hockey club as well as assisting with the Little Caesars 2005 team.

== Playing career ==
As a youth, Rolston played in the 1985 and 1987 Quebec International Pee-Wee Hockey Tournaments with the Detroit Compuware and Detroit Red Wings minor ice hockey teams.

Rolston is considered a utility forward, as he can play as a center, left wing and right wing competently. Standing 6'2' and 214 pounds in his playing days, he was known for his two-way ability.

Rolston was drafted in the 1991 NHL entry draft by the New Jersey Devils as their second pick in the first round. Prior to his NHL career, Rolston played for Lake Superior State University (where as a freshman he scored the game-winning goal and earned Most Outstanding Player honors in the National Championship game, which his team won), then the Albany River Rats of the American Hockey League (AHL). He has played for the Devils, the Minnesota Wild, the Colorado Avalanche and the Boston Bruins. Rolston was one of four players who was traded from Colorado in the 2000 deal that sent the Bruins' Ray Bourque to the Avalanche. He scored a then career-high 62 points, including nine shorthanded goals in 2001–02 with the Bruins to establish a club record. During his career, he scored a total of 33 shorthanded goals.

Rolston signed with the Minnesota Wild as an unrestricted free agent on July 8, 2004, though his Wild debut did not occur until the 2005–06 season due to the 2004–05 NHL lockout. Rolston often quarterbacked the Wild's powerplay (a task normally given to a defenseman) due to his booming shot from the point and strong two-way ability. During the season, he was an on-ice leader and was one of the Wild's top scorers, scoring a new career high of 79 points. He was named as team captain for Minnesota for February, October and November 2006 and January 2007. During 2006–07, Rolston scored three goals (one on a penalty shot and two in overtime shootouts), using a slapshot from the slot. He was selected for the 2006–07 NHL Western Conference All-Star Team. During the game, Rolston scored two goals and added two assists. Rolston's shot is also known for making Anaheim Ducks goaltender Jean-Sébastien Giguère duck for cover during a game in the 2007–08 season when Rolston fired a slapshot from the right wing aiming for the top left corner of the net. Giguère ducked to avoid being hit in the mask, resulting in a goal for Rolston. In a similar event during the 2006–07 NHL season, Rolston fired a slapshot on Vancouver Canucks goaltender Roberto Luongo. The shot hit Luongo in the mask, and though unhurt, Luongo was dazed for minutes, lying on the ice until the team's trainer confirmed he was okay to continue the game. Rolston would later score on a penalty shot using his slapshot in the same game against Luongo.

On June 29, 2008, Rolston's negotiating rights were traded to the Tampa Bay Lightning in return for a conditional draft pick in 2009 or 2010. After failing to agree to a contract with the Lightning, Rolston became a free agent the next day on July 1, 2008, and signed a four-year, $20 million contract to return to the New Jersey Devils.

Rolston was traded to the New York Islanders for Trent Hunter. In reaction to the trade, Rolston was quoted by The Star Ledger as saying, "It's been a bit of a rough ride in Jersey, I'm actually happy to go to a place that wants me. I just want to start new. I'm actually really happy about the change... I saw it coming. There was no blindside here. It was something we discussed from the end of the season and into the summer." Rolston had been waived by the Devils during the 2010–11 season, and was then entering the final year of the four-year contract he signed in 2008.

After a poor performance on the Islanders where he only scored nine points, Rolston was traded to the Boston Bruins (along with Mike Mottau) in exchange for Yannick Riendeau and Marc Cantin.

After 17 seasons and 1,256 career NHL games, Rolston announced his retirement from the NHL on April 30, 2013.

== Slapshot notoriety ==
Rolston's frequent use of the slapshot became a specific subject of notoriety during his tenure with the Minnesota Wild. While Rolston was known for having an above average slapshot early in his career, his use of it on penalty shots and shootouts garnered NHL-wide attention and resulted in Sports Illustrated ranking his shot eighth all-time in March 2013, after Rolston's retirement. The advent of his unorthodox approach began after Jacques Lemaire, head coach of the Wild, mentioned to Rolston during a practice he had a dream the night before that Rolston used a slapshot in a shootout and scored. The very next day, in a game against the Vancouver Canucks, Rolston scored on a penalty shot, beating goaltender Roberto Luongo with a slapshot. After this, Rolston began to use the slapshot regularly in these situations.

== Personal life ==
Rolston and his wife Jennifer have four sons: Ryder, Brody, Stone and Zane. Ryder currently plays for Milwaukee Admirals. Ryder was drafted by the Colorado Avalanche in the fifth round of the 2020 NHL entry draft before being traded to the Blackhawks in April 2021. His older brother is Ron Rolston, a former coach of the Buffalo Sabres. Rolston has been a resident of Traverse City, Michigan.

== Career statistics ==
=== Regular season and playoffs ===
			Regular season					Playoffs
Season	Team	League	GP	G	A	Pts	PIM	GP	G	A	Pts	PIM
1989–90	Compuware Ambassadors	NAHL	40	36	37	73	57	—	—	—	—	—
1990–91	Compuware Ambassadors	NAHL	36	49	46	95	14	—	—	—	—	—
1991–92	Lake Superior State Lakers	CCHA	41	18	28	46	16	—	—	—	—	—
1992–93	Lake Superior State Lakers	CCHA	39	33	31	64	20	—	—	—	—	—
1993–94	United States	Intl	41	20	28	48	36	—	—	—	—	—
1993–94	Albany River Rats	AHL	17	5	5	10	8	5	1	2	3	0
1994–95	Albany River Rats	AHL	18	9	11	20	10	—	—	—	—	—
1994–95	New Jersey Devils	NHL	40	7	11	18	17	6	2	1	3	4
1995–96	New Jersey Devils	NHL	58	13	11	24	8	—	—	—	—	—
1996–97	New Jersey Devils	NHL	81	18	27	45	20	10	4	1	5	6
1997–98	New Jersey Devils	NHL	76	16	14	30	16	6	1	0	1	2
1998–99	New Jersey Devils	NHL	82	24	33	57	14	7	1	0	1	2
1999–2000	New Jersey Devils	NHL	11	3	1	4	0	—	—	—	—	—
1999–2000	Colorado Avalanche	NHL	50	8	10	18	12	—	—	—	—	—
1999–2000	Boston Bruins	NHL	16	5	4	9	6	—	—	—	—	—
2000–01	Boston Bruins	NHL	77	19	39	58	28	—	—	—	—	—
2001–02	Boston Bruins	NHL	82	31	31	62	30	6	4	1	5	0
2002–03	Boston Bruins	NHL	81	27	32	59	32	5	0	2	2	0
2003–04	Boston Bruins	NHL	82	19	29	48	40	7	1	0	1	8
2005–06	Minnesota Wild	NHL	81	34	45	79	48	—	—	—	—	—
2006–07	Minnesota Wild	NHL	78	31	33	64	46	5	1	1	2	4
2007–08	Minnesota Wild	NHL	81	31	28	59	53	6	2	4	6	8
2008–09	New Jersey Devils	NHL	64	15	17	32	30	7	1	1	2	4
2009–10	New Jersey Devils	NHL	80	20	17	37	22	5	2	1	3	0
2010–11	New Jersey Devils	NHL	65	14	20	34	34	—	—	—	—	—
2011–12	New York Islanders	NHL	49	4	5	9	6	—	—	—	—	—
2011–12	Boston Bruins	NHL	21	3	12	15	8	7	1	2	3	0
NHL totals			1,256	342	419	761	472	77	20	14	34	38

=== International ===
Year	Team	Event	Result	GP	G	A	Pts	PIM
1991	United States	WJC	4th	8	1	5	6	0
1992	United States	WJC	3rd place, bronze medalist(s)	7	3	3	6	2
1993	United States	WJC	4th	7	6	2	8	2
1994	United States	OG	8th	8	7	0	7	8
1996	United States	WC	3rd place, bronze medalist(s)	8	3	4	7	4
1996	United States	WCH	1st place, gold medalist(s)	1	0	0	0	0
2002	United States	OG	2nd place, silver medalist(s)	6	0	3	3	0
2004	United States	WCH	4th	2	0	0	0	0
2006	United States	OG	8th	6	3	1	4	4
Junior totals				22	10	10	20	4
Senior totals				31	13	8	21	16

== Awards and honors ==
Award	Year
College
CCHA All-Tournament Team	1992, 1993
NCAA All-Tournament Team	1992, 1993
All-CCHA First Team	1993
AHCA West Second-Team All-American	1993
NHL
All-Star Game	2007
Stanley Cup champion (New Jersey Devils)	1995

== See also ==
- List of NHL players with 1,000 games played

Awards and achievements
Preceded by Scott Niedermayer	New Jersey Devils first-round draft pick 1991	Succeeded by Jason Smith
Sporting positions
Preceded by Willie Mitchell	Minnesota Wild captain February 2006	Succeeded by Wes Walz
Preceded by Wes Walz	Minnesota Wild captain Oct/Nov 2006	Succeeded by Keith Carney
Preceded by Keith Carney	Minnesota Wild captain January 2007	Succeeded by Mark Parrish
Preceded by Pavol Demitra	Minnesota Wild captain November 2007	Succeeded by Mark Parrish
