= Sandy Moger =

Canadian former ice hockey player (born 1969)

- Born: March 21, 1969 (age 57) 100 Mile House, British Columbia, Canada
- Height: 6 ft 3 in (191 cm)
- Weight: 218 lb (99 kg; 15 st 8 lb)
- Position: Right wing
- Shot: Right
- Played for: NHL; Los Angeles Kings; Boston Bruins; SM-liiga; Ässät; HIFK; DEL; Krefeld Pinguine; Schwenninger Wild Wings
- NHL draft: 176th overall, 1989; Vancouver Canucks
- Playing career: 1992–2007

Alexander "Sandy" Moger (born March 21, 1969) is a Canadian former ice hockey player who played in the National Hockey League for the Boston Bruins and the Los Angeles Kings. Moger was drafted 176th overall by the Vancouver Canucks in the 1989 NHL entry draft, but never managed to play a game for them. In five NHL seasons, Moger scored 79 points (41 goals and 38 assists) in 236 regular season games, picking up 212 penalty minutes in the process. He also played in seasons between 2001 and 2007 in Europe.

Moger is notable for having scored the first goal at Boston's FleetCenter (now known as the TD Garden) during a game against the New York Islanders on October 7, 1995.

== Career statistics ==
			Regular season					Playoffs
Season	Team	League	GP	G	A	Pts	PIM	GP	G	A	Pts	PIM
1986–87	Vernon Lakers	BCJHL	13	5	4	9	10	—	—	—	—	—
1987–88	Yorkton Terriers	SJHL	60	39	41	80	144	16	7	6	13	—
1988–89	Lake Superior State University	NCAA	—	—	—	—	—	—	—	—	—	—
1989–90	Lake Superior State University	NCAA	37	5	21	26	28	—	—	—	—	—
1990–91	Lake Superior State University	NCAA	37	5	21	26	28	—	—	—	—	—
1991–92	Lake Superior State University	NCAA	37	5	21	26	28	—	—	—	—	—
1992–93	Hamilton Canucks	AHL	78	23	26	49	57	—	—	—	—	—
1993–94	Hamilton Canucks	AHL	29	9	8	17	41	—	—	—	—	—
1994–95	Providence Bruins	AHL	63	32	29	61	105	—	—	—	—	—
1994–95	Boston Bruins	NHL	18	2	6	8	6	—	—	—	—	—
1995–96	Boston Bruins	NHL	80	15	14	29	65	5	2	2	4	12
1996–97	Boston Bruins	NHL	34	10	3	13	45	—	—	—	—	—
1996–97	Providence Bruins	AHL	3	0	2	2	19	—	—	—	—	—
1997–98	Los Angeles Kings	NHL	62	11	13	24	70	—	—	—	—	—
1998–99	Los Angeles Kings	NHL	42	3	2	5	26	—	—	—	—	—
1999–00	Houston Aeros	IHL	45	13	10	23	43	2	1	1	2	4
2000–01	Houston Aeros	IHL	63	18	24	42	58	7	5	0	5	2
2001–02	Ässät	Liiga	36	13	11	24	79	—	—	—	—	—
2001–02	HIFK	Liiga	12	2	2	4	14	—	—	—	—	—
2002–03	Krefeld Pinguine	DEL	44	11	5	16	52	14	2	2	4	34
2003–04	SERC Wild Wings	Germany2	46	33	26	59	107	3	0	3	3	4
2004–05	SERC Wild Wings	Germany2	32	11	9	20	58	1	1	0	1	2
2005–06	SERC Wild Wings	Germany2	47	28	24	52	120	10	7	5	12	28
2006–07	HC Pustertal Wölfe	Italy	37	29	27	56	102	—	—	—	—	—
NHL totals			236	41	38	79	212	5	2	2	4	12

== Awards and honours ==
Award	Year
All-CCHA Second Team	1991-92
